= Rendum Rendum Anju =

- Title card
- Directed by: Jayabharathi
- Written by: R. Kothandaraman (dialogues)
- Screenplay by: Jayabharathi
- Story by: Jayabharathi
- Produced by: Rajapalayam; Janagaraj
- Starring: Sarath Babu; Ambika
- Cinematography: R. M. Ramesh
- Edited by: S. Natarajan
- Music by: Gangai Amaran
- Production company: Dhanalakshmi Movie Makers
- Release date: 3 June 1988
- Country: India
- Language: Tamil

Rendum Rendum Anju (transl. Two plus two is five) is a 1988 Indian Tamil-language psychological thriller film directed and co-written by Jayabharathi. The film stars Sarath Babu and Ambika, with Chandrasekhar, Nassar, Vennira Aadai Moorthy, Senthil and Leo Prabhu in supporting roles. It was released on 3 June 1988.

== Plot ==
Shanthi, a deeply superstitious wife, learns of an astrologer’s ominous prediction that her husband, Balu, is destined to die. Terrified, she becomes obsessed with preventing the prophecy from coming true, trying every possible ritual and precaution she believes might alter fate. Meanwhile, a series of strange and deadly “accidents” begin claiming the lives of a group of friends. As the story unfolds, it becomes clear that these deaths are not accidental at all but are being carefully orchestrated by a vengeful stranger. The victims are being eliminated one by one in a precise, premeditated order that mirrors the sequence in which they appear in an old group photograph. As panic grows, Balu, who relies on logic and reason, finds himself increasingly at odds with Shanthi’s growing superstition and fear-driven behavior. Together, they are forced to confront both fate and reason as they race to uncover the identity of the killer before Balu becomes the next target in the sequence.

== Cast ==
- Sarath Babu as Balu
- Ambika as Shanthi
- Anjana as Chithra
- Vinoth as Suresh
- Chandrasekhar as Raja
- Nassar as Giri
- Vennira Aadai Moorthy
- Senthil
- Leo Prabhu

== Production ==
Rendum Rendum Anju was made "on the lines of" Alfred Hitchcock's film Vertigo (1958). Jayabharathi revealed he initially approached Vijayakanth for the film "but I did not get a positive response from him", he later made the film comprising with the star cast such as Sarath Babu, Ambika, Nassar and Moorthy and completed the filming within 50 days.

== Soundtrack ==
The music was composed by Gangai Amaran, with lyrics by Vaali.

Track listing
No.	Title	Singer(s)	Length
1.	"Gaana Karunkuyile"	Malaysia Vasudevan, Mano, K. S. Chithra, S. N. Surendar	4:13
2.	"Panneer Poovin"	K. S. Chithra	4:28
3.	"Edhukkum Oru"	K. S. Chithra	3:59
4.	"Valarpirai"	Mano	4:21
Total length:			17:01

== Release and reception ==
Rendum Rendum Anju was released on 3 June 1988, and had a low-profile release. Jayamanmadhan (a duo) of Kalki appreciated Jayabharathi for wanting to tell a different kind of story. They appreciated the music, and said the film had an entertaining first half, but post interval it stumbled.
