= Jayabharathi (director) =

Indian film director (1946 or 1947 – 2024)

Jaybharathi
- Born: 1946 or 1947
- Died: 6 December 2024 (aged 77); Chennai, Tamil Nadu, India
- Other name: R. Jayaraman
- Occupation: Director

Jayabharathi (1946 or 1947 – 6 December 2024) was an Indian film director and screenwriter who worked on Tamil films. Regarded as one of the pioneers of alternate cinema in the Tamil film industry, Jayabharathi directed nine films across five decades.

== Life and career ==
As a film student in the 1970s, Jayabharathi explored the idea of making films in an alternate genre in Tamil cinema and became one of the pioneers of the movement. His first film Kudisai (1979) was released after he undertook a crowd-funding route in order to raise Rs90,000 to distribute the film for screening, and in order to generate investment, he sold donation tickets and conducted programmes at government colleges. The film won critical acclaim upon release and has since been preserved at the National Film Archives. He subsequently went on to work with the newspaper Dinamani and wrote articles focussing on world cinema issues. He was briefly associated as an actor in C. Rudhraiya's second film Gramathu Athiyayam (1980), but was later replaced in the lead role by newcomer Nandakumar. His second film was Oomai Jannagal (1984), which depicted a tale on the bonded labour in a tea estate during the rule of the British Raj, while his third film Rendum Rendum Aindhu (1988), was murder mystery tale. His next, Uchi Veyil (1991), which focused on a middle-class family's struggles, was selected as the only Tamil film at the Indian Panorama held in Calcutta in 1991 and was later screened in Film Festivals across Canada.

In the early 2000s, Jayabharathi worked on Nanba Nanba (2002), a tale of friendship and sacrifice amongst two friends, with Chandrasekhar winning the National Film Award for Best Supporting Actor for his portrayal of a quadriplegic. The film itself, narrowly missed out on the Best Film Award. In 2006, he shot and completed the thriller Kurukshetram starring Sathyaraj. Through the film, he revealed he had hoped to draw an allegory of the diplomatic tensions between the nations of India, Pakistan and the United States through the leading characters. Following the film's poor response, Jayabharathi kept away from feature films and concentrated on docudramas. In 2009, he was selected by Doordarshan as one of sixteen directors to help serialize stories written by Sahitya Akademi winners and made the short film, Velvi Thee with newcomers. He subsequently worked on a docudrama on transgender people titled Aravani alongside Janaki Vishwanathan, Sivasankari and S. Ve. Shekher.

One of his later completed ventures, Puthiran, a tale on child labour and abuse, became stuck as a result of financial constraints. The film, which stars Y. Gee. Mahendra and Sangeetha, won positive reviews after being screened at the 2012 Chennai International Film Festival but could not get released as the makers could not pay the processing labs Rs 30 lakhs. In an attempt to release the film in 2013, Jayabharathi pledged that any investor who contributed over Rs 1000 would be credited in the film. In 2017, the film was awarded the Tamil Nadu State Film Award for Best Film for third best Tamil film in 2010.

Jayabharathi died in Chennai on 6 December 2024, at the age of 77.

== Filmography ==
Year	Film	Notes	Ref.
1979	Kudisai		
1984	Oomai Janangal		
1988	Rendum Rendum Anju		
1991	Uchi Veyil		
2002	Nanba Nanba		
2006	Kurukshetram		
2010	Puthiran	Unreleased; Tamil Nadu State Film Award for Best Film - 3rd prize	
