= Aval Appadithan (soundtrack) =

- Original album cover art

Soundtrack album by Ilaiyaraaja
- Released: 1978
- Genre: Feature film soundtrack
- Length: 10:43
- Language: Tamil
- Label: EMI Records
- Producer: Ilaiyaraaja

Ilaiyaraaja chronology
Sigappu Rojakkal (1978)	Aval Appadithan (1978)	Sonnadhu Nee Thanaa (1978)

Aval Appadithan is the soundtrack to the 1978 film of the same name directed by C. Rudraiah starring Sripriya, Rajinikanth, and Kamal Haasan. The soundtrack featured three songs composed by Ilaiyaraaja that spans around 10 minutes and released under the label of EMI Records.

== Development ==
Aval Appadithan's soundtrack and background score were composed by Ilaiyaraaja. Despite his busy schedules, he agreed to compose for Aval Appadithan at the insistence of Rudhraiya and Haasan. After the recording session of "Ninaivo Oru Paravai" from Sigappu Rojakkal (1978), Ilaiyaraaja asked Haasan to record "Panneer Pushpangale" that same afternoon. During the recording session, Ilaiyaraaja suggested that Haasan tone down the opening notes; when Haasan sang perfectly as per his suggestion, Ilaiyaraaja accepted Haasan's next rendition of the song. Ilaiyaraaja wanted Vanna Nilavan to write the lyrics for "Uravugal Thodarkathai", but since Vanna Nilavan had difficulties in writing the lyrics, he opted out. He was subsequently replaced with his brother Gangai Amaran.

== Track listing ==
No.	Title	Lyrics	Singer(s)	Length
1.	"Uravugal Thodarkathai"	Gangai Amaran	K. J. Yesudas	4:13
2.	"Panneer Pushpangale"	Gangai Amaran	Kamal Haasan	3:09
3.	"Vazhkkai Odam"	Kannadasan	S. Janaki	3:21
Total length:				10:43

== Reception ==
B. Kolappan of The Hindu reviewed the film's soundtrack. Regarding "Uravugal Thodarkathai", he added that the song "poignantly captures the vulnerable moments in the life of a woman", while "Panneer Pushpangale" and "Vaazhkai Odam Chella" had a "philosophical touch." According to Swarnavel Eswaran Pillai, author of the article The 1970s Tamil cinema and the post-classical turn, the songs were used "to punctuate the interiority of the characters rather than as a spectacle or as a device to move the plot forward." Nandhu Sundaram of The News Minute added that Ilaiyaraaja's score "is in perfect sync with the film's seriousness" and "hints at what is to come even while trying to capture the inner life of the primary characters"; he further said that both "Uravugal Thodarkathai" and "Panneer Pushpangale" were "radio favourites". Rakesh Thara of ABP Live Tamil described "Uravugal Thodarkathai" as "a song that gives hope". On Ilaiyaraaja's 80th birthday (2 June 2023), Mathrubhumi listed "Uravugal Thodarkathai" as one of Ilaiyaraaja's best compositions saying "the melody of the maestro is complemented by the lyrics".

== Legacy ==
In June 2013, A. Muthusamy of Honey Bee Music enhanced the songs from their original version on the film's soundtrack album to 5.1 surround sound. The song "Uravugal Thodarkathai" was reused in the film Megha (2014).
