= Gramathu Athiyayam =

- Theatrical release poster
- Directed by: C. Rudraiah
- Written by: Gurudev (dialogues)
- Screenplay by: Ananthu
- Story by: Ananthu
- Produced by: C. Rudhraiya
- Starring: Nandakumar; Krishnakumari; Chandrahasan; Sundar; Swarnalatha
- Cinematography: Nalluswamy Gnanasekaran
- Edited by: Kannan; Thyagu
- Music by: Ilaiyaraaja
- Production company: Kumar Arts
- Release date: 19 September 1980
- Country: India
- Language: Tamil

Gramathu Athiyayam (transl. Village Chapter) is a 1980 Indian Tamil-language film directed by C. Rudraiah. The film stars Nandakumar, Sundar and Swarnalatha. It was released on 19 September 1980.

== Cast ==
- Chandrahasan
- Nandakumar
- Krishnakumari
- Sundar
- Swarnalatha

== Production ==
Gramathu Athiyayam was the second and final film to be directed by C. Rudraiah after Aval Appadithan (1978). Jayabharathi who went on to direct films like Kudisai and Uchi Veyil was initially selected as lead actor. Kamal Haasan was also reportedly considered for lead role; since he was in London for a month for a film by K. Balachander, a newcomer, Nandakumar, was cast in the lead role. Saritha was also initially chosen as lead actress before she too was replaced.

== Soundtrack ==
The soundtrack was composed by Ilaiyaraaja, with lyrics written by Gangai Amaran.

Track listing
No.	Title	Singer(s)	Length
1.	"Aatthu Mettuley"	Malaysia Vasudevan, S. Janaki
2.	"Vaadaatha Rosapoo"	S. P. Balasubrahmanyam
3.	"Ootha Kaathu"	P. Jayachandran, S. Janaki
4.	"Poovae Ithu"	B. S. Sasirekha

== Release and reception ==
Gramathu Athiyayam was released on 19 September 1980. Nalini Sastry of Kalki praised the cinematography, music and crisp dialogues and also praised that the director's talent shows in not only portraying a girl's story but also her emotions and concluded calling it an emotionally affecting film. Anna praised the acting, cinematography, music and concluded that though not as good as his debut film Aval Appadithan, one cannot ignore it as bad.
