= Keladi Kannmanii =

1991 film by Vasanth

- Theatrical release poster
- Directed by: Vasanth
- Screenplay by: Vasanth
- Story by: Ananthu
- Produced by: A. Sundaram
- Starring: S. P. Balasubrahmanyam; Radikaa; Ramesh Aravind; Anju
- Cinematography: R. Raghunatha Reddy
- Edited by: Ganesh–Kumar
- Music by: Ilaiyaraaja
- Production company: Vivek Chithra Productions
- Release date: 27 July 1990
- Running time: 140 minutes
- Country: India
- Language: Tamil

Keladi Kannmanii (transl. Listen, sweetheart; also spelt Keladi Kanmani) is a 1990 Indian Tamil-language romantic drama film that marked the directorial debut of Vasanth. The film stars S. P. Balasubrahmanyam, Radikaa, Ramesh Aravind and Anju. It revolves around a terminally ill woman who seeks to make amends for a past mistake before she dies.

Producer A. Sundaram approached Vasanth to make a film for his production company, Vivek Chithra Productions, but Vasanth did not have a story. Ananthu created the story of Keladi Kannmanii, which Vasanth developed into a screenplay. Cinematography was handled by R. Raghunatha Reddy, editing was by the duo Ganesh–Kumar, and Maghi made his debut as art director.

Keladi Kannmanii was released on 27 July 1990 and became a commercial success, running for over 285 days at theatres. It won three Tamil Nadu State Film Awards (including Second Best Film) and Radikaa won the Filmfare Award for Best Actress – Tamil.

== Plot ==
Anu is a college student living with her father, A. R. Rangaraj (ARR), a widower. Her classmate Sasi desperately tries to win her affection. Sasi and Anu play various pranks on each other, but eventually fall in love with each other.

Anu is strangely sad from time to time; she repeats to Sasi that something tells her something bad is about to happen. She begins to get frequent sharp headaches, and consults a doctor who diagnozes that she has bilateral renal artery stenosis and is almost certain to succumb within a year. She may require an operation within that time, but the likelihood of her coming through it alive is minimal. Anu discusses the matter with Sasi, and reveals a thread from her past that may explain her melancholic mood.

The film flashes back to several years before, when Anu had just lost her mother. ARR hires Saradha as Anu's math teacher. Saradha's parents are deaf and mute. Slowly, ARR and Saradha fall for each other, and decide to get married. But Anu is too possessive of her mother and is unable to accept Sarada (or anyone else) as a replacement. ARR and Sarada cancel their wedding, and her parents committed suicide as they feel they are a hindrance to their daughter.

Back to the current, Anu seeks Sasi's help to unite ARR and Saradha. They find an old picture of Sarada, and Sasi recognises her as a woman he had met in Bangalore a few weeks before. He sets off on a frantic hunt for Sarada. On the day of the operation, Sarada happens to be in Chennai en route to a training event in the United States. After a series of near-misses, Sasi locates her in the nick of time and brings her to Anu and ARR moments before Anu gets anaesthetised. Anu later goes for one last ride with Sasi on his motorcycle and she says that something tells her that something good is about to happen.

== Cast ==
- S. P. Balasubrahmanyam as A. R. Rangaraj (ARR)
- Radikaa as Sarada
- Ramesh Aravind as Sasi
- Anju as Anu
- Janagaraj as Adaikkalam
- Poornam Viswanathan as Sarada's father
- Srividya as Sarada's mother
- Baby Neena as young Anu
- Charle as Sasi's friend
- Chinni Jayanth as Adaikkalam's friend
- Vivek as Adaikkalam's friend
- Krishnan as Mahadevan
- Geetha as Charulatha (ARR's wife)

== Production ==
=== Development ===
When film producer A. Sundaram approached Vasanth, an assistant to K. Balachander, to make a film for his production company, Vivek Chithra Productions, Vasanth was sceptical; he recalled, "Maybe he thought that just like how he was making [Pudhea Paadhai] with Bhagyaraj's assistant Parthiban at that time, he should make one with KB sir's assistant. I said I'd get back to him." Vasanth's family scolded him that he "should be thankful that I’m getting a producer without me getting a story ready and approaching many producers to produce it". Sundaram told him to return once he had a story ready.

Vasanth wanted to make films like his mentor Balachander, Mahendran and Balu Mahendra, so he decided to make one "that was mature for my age. So, a romance between two mature people was the starting point". The story was created by Ananthu, another assistant to Balachander, and Vasanth developed it into a screenplay. Keladi Kannmanii was Vasanth's directorial debut, and was named after the song of the same name from Balachander's Pudhu Pudhu Arthangal (1989). Cinematography was handled by R. Raghunatha Reddy, editing by the duo Ganesh–Kumar, and Maghi made his debut as art director.

=== Casting ===
Vasanth approached S. P. Balasubrahmanyam to portray A. R. Rangaraj (ARR). The pair had earlier worked on Manathil Urudhi Vendum (1987), for which Vasanth was an assistant director. Vasanth was impressed with his realistic acting style and felt a "strong impression of him as a good actor, so we roped him in as an acting coup". Balasubrahmanyam was initially hesitant to accept the offer as he did not want Vasanth to take a risk by making a film with him as the lead actor. Vasanth remained firm with his selection because he wanted ARR "to be a character, which would not be possible with a popular face".

Suhasini was Vasanth's first choice for the role of Sarada, but she could not accept the offer due to her busy schedule; Radikaa was chosen instead. Ramesh Aravind was cast as Sasi because Vasanth worked with him in the Kannada film Sundara Swapnagalu (1986). According to Aravind, Vasanth approached him because the actor who was his original choice for the role could not accept. Sukanya and Ramya Krishnan were initial choices for the role of Anu, but could not accept due to other commitments; Anju was finally chosen by Vasanth, despite the scepticism of the crew since she was a relative newcomer. Neena played the character as a child after Vasanth saw her in Idhayathai Thirudathe, the Tamil-dubbed version of the Telugu film Geethanjali (1989).

=== Filming ===
While scouting for filming locations, Vasanth came across an old house which was available for filming only for two days; he decided this would be the original house of Sarada. The first shot Vasanth directed was the scene where Sarada cries over the death of her parents. Before filming the scene, Radikaa asked for some time to prepare; she came much later and finished filming the scene in one take. Aravind's first scenes to be filmed were those with Radikaa; he had only three days to film those scenes as Radikaa was due to leave for London soon after. His other scenes, including those with Anju, were filmed after he reworked his call-sheet dates.

Due to Balasubrahmanyam's playback singing commitments, he could only shoot for two hours each day. The scooter that Balasubrahmanyam drove as ARR was a Bajaj Chetak. The song "Mannil Indha Kaadhal" was filmed at a beach off East Coast Road, Mahabalipuram.

== Music ==
The music was composed by Ilaiyaraaja, and the soundtrack album was released by Echo Records. Ilaiyaraaja was Vasanth's only choice for composing the music; despite his busy schedule, he accepted the offer. The song "Nee Pathi Naan Pathi" is set in Chakravakam, a Carnatic raga, and "Mannil Indha Kaadhal" is set in Keeravani. The song "Varanam Aayiram" is a ragamalika, a song set in multiple ragas; one stanza is set in Nayaki.

"Mannil Indha Kaadhal" was not originally planned to appear in the film. Vasanth wanted to showcase Balasubrahmanyam's singing prowess in a scene, but did not know how to do it. The idea of "breathless singing" eventually struck Vasanth; and Balasubrahmanyam agreed. The song has Balasubrahmanyam singing two stanzas seemingly without taking a single breath in between the lines. Vasanth initially proposed that the entire song be sung in one breath, but Ilaiyaraaja said to limit that to specific stanzas. Balasubrahmanyam took 40 seconds to sing the second breathless stanza; he sang breathlessly for the first 25 seconds, and the last 15 seconds after briefly inhaling. It was then edited to look like he sang the entire stanza without taking breath. While the lyrics are credited to Ilaiyaraaja's elder brother Pavalar Varadharajan, the song was actually written by their younger brother Gangai Amaran who sought to honour Varadharajan who had died long before.

When Ilaiyaraaja asked if the song "Karpoora Bommai Ondru" could be played in bits throughout the film, rather than all at once, Vasanth agreed because "it would be like something that haunts the characters, and make audiences expect for the moment when we would play it in its entirety". The entire soundtrack (except for "Mannil Indha Kaadhal") was completed in 45 minutes. Ilaiyaraaja took three days to compose the background music for the two reels forming the climax. For the Telugu-dubbed version O Papa Lali, all lyrics were written by Rajasri.

Tamil
No.	Title	Lyrics	Singer(s)	Length
1.	"Enna Paduvathu"	Gangai Amaran	Ilaiyaraaja, Arunmozhi, Saibaba	4:43
2.	"Karpoora Bommai"	Mu. Metha	P. Susheela	4:45
3.	"Mannil Indha Kaadhal"	Gangai Amaran (Note: Credited exclusively to Pavalar Varadharajan, who provided no creative input.)	S. P. Balasubrahmanyam	4:13
4.	"Nee Pathi Naan Pathi"	Vaali	K. J. Yesudas, Uma Ramanan	4:40
5.	"Thanniyile Nenanja"	Vaali	Uma Ramanan	4:41
6.	"Thenral Thaan"	Piraisoodan	K. J. Yesudas, K. S. Chithra	4:41
7.	"Varanam Aayiram"	Aandal	S. Janaki	2:45
Total length:				30:28

Telugu
No.	Title	Singer(s)	Length
1.	"Yemi Paadedi"	Mano	4:52
2.	"Karpoora Bomma"	P. Susheela	4:55
3.	"Maate Raani"	S. P. Balasubrahmanyam	4:20
4.	"Neevega Na Pranam"	K. J. Yesudas, K. S. Chithra	4:54
5.	"Segali Sandela"	K. J. Yesudas, K. S. Chithra	4:41
6.	"Jeevana Mangala"	K. S. Chithra	2:50
Total length:			26:44

== Release ==
Keladi Kannmanii was released on 27 July 1990. The film was a commercial success, running for over 285 days in theatres, becoming a silver jubilee film. The success of the film enabled Ramesh Aravind to obtain roles in other Tamil films.

=== Critical reception ===
N. Krishnaswamy of The Indian Express wrote, "Class photography by Raghunatha Reddy, brilliant decors created by debutant art director Maghi along with choice of new-look locales, rich music by [Ilaiyaraaja] and excellent staging of action by director Vasanth – even in his first film, this protégé of K. Balachander shows a great deal of competence – put Vivek Chitra's [Keladi Kannmanii] in the top bracket." Ananda Vikatan said that Vasanth had taken a weighty script in his first attempt and told it very clearly without any confusion for the audience, that he demonstrated self-confidence by choosing Balasubrahmanyam for the male lead and Anju for the role of his daughter, and that he made his guru (Balachander) proud with the film, rating it 55 out of 100.

=== Accolades ===
Event	Category	Awardee	Ref.
Filmfare Awards South	Best Actress – Tamil	Radikaa	
Tamil Nadu State Film Awards	Second Best Film	Keladi Kannmanii	
Tamil Nadu State Film Awards	Best Lyricist	Vaali	
Tamil Nadu State Film Awards	Best Male Playback Singer	S. P. Balasubrahmanyam	

== Bibliography ==
- Dhananjayan, G. (2011). The Best of Tamil Cinema, 1931 to 2010: 1977–2010. Galatta Media. OCLC 733724281.
- Sundararaman (2007) [2005]. Raga Chintamani: A Guide to Carnatic Ragas Through Tamil Film Music (2nd ed.). Chennai: Pichhamal Chintamani. OCLC 295034757.
