= Ilamai Kolam =

- Poster
- Directed by: N. Venkatesh
- Written by: K. Bhagyaraj
- Produced by: Cumbam S. S. Bhoominathan
- Starring: Suman; Radhika; Pratap Pothen
- Cinematography: A. Vincent
- Edited by: R. Bhaskaran
- Music by: Ilaiyaraaja
- Production company: Gee Bee Vee Creations
- Release date: 19 July 1980
- Country: India
- Language: Tamil

Ilamai Kolam (transl. Adolescence) is a 1980 Indian Tamil-language film directed by N. Venkatesh. The film stars Suman, Radhika and Pratap Pothen. It was released on 19 July 1980. The film is adapted from the 1979 Hindi film Jurmana.

== Cast ==
- Suman as Rajesh
- Radhika
- Janagaraj as Suresh's friend
- Pratap Pothen
- Nisha
- Senthil as Office watchman
- K. R. Indira Devi
- Suvarna as Sujatha

== Production ==
The film was launched at AVM Studios on 11 November 1979. Both the film's shoot and song recording began on the same day.

== Soundtrack ==
Music was composed by Ilaiyaraaja. The song "Kannan Naalai" is set to the Carnatic raga Gourimanohari.

Song	Singers	Lyrics
Sridevi En Vazhvil	K. J. Yesudas	Kannadasan
Kannan Naalai	S. Janaki	Kannadasan
Vecha Paarvai	K. J. Yesudas	Gangai Amaran
Nee Illatha	Malaysia Vasudevan, Sujatha	Gangai Amaran

== Reception ==
Kanthan of Kalki wrote the makers should have chosen a better story from Hindi instead of choosing this foolish story. Naagai Dharuman of Anna praised the acting of the actors, Vincent's cinematography, Ilayaraja's music and concluded calling it a heart warming colour kolam. The film's success made Suman popular as a glamorous actor in South Indian cinema.
