= Murugashankari Leo =

Indian actor, scholar and dancer (born 1983)

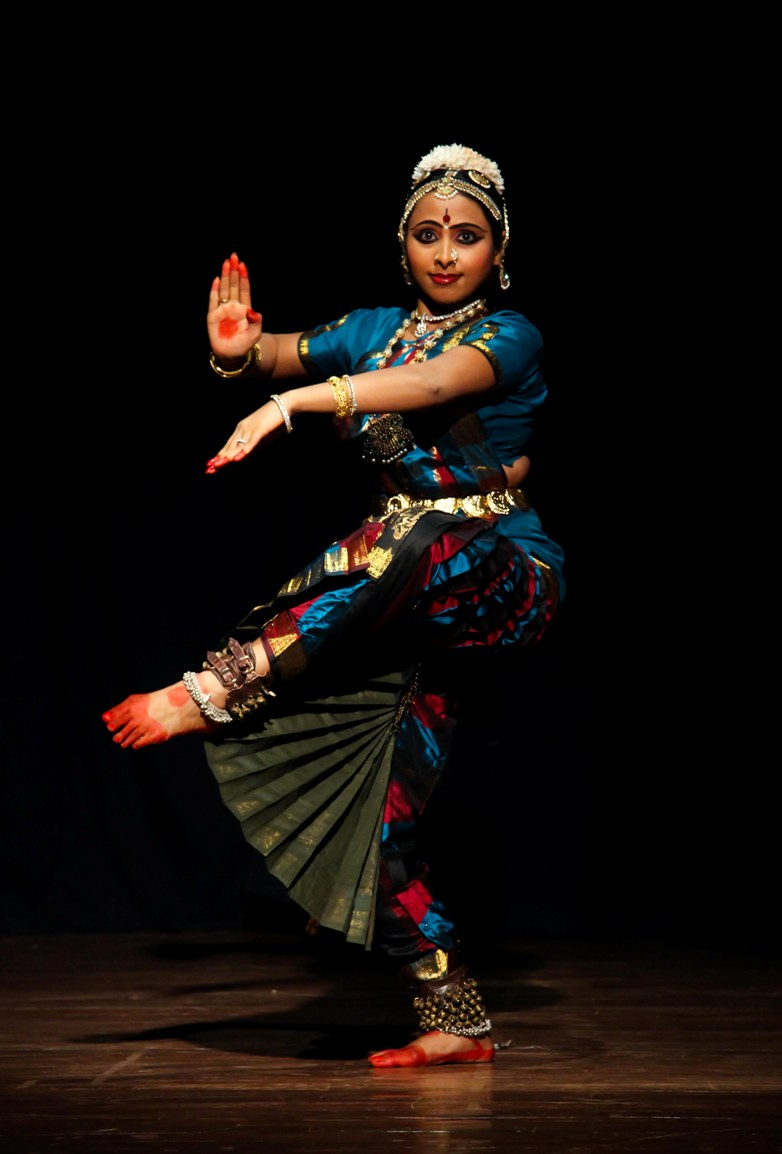
- Murugashankari Leo, Bharatanatyam Danseuse
- Born: Murugashankari.L; 1983 Chennai, India; Chennai, India
- Occupations: Bharatanatyam Danseuse, Research Scholar & Theater Actor
- Years active: 2000–present
- Spouse: Vivekh Kumar
- Parent(s): 'Kalaimamani' Leo Prabu, Usha Prabu
- Website: kalaikoodam.org

Murugashankari Leo is an Indian dance tutor, theatric actor, and research scholar.

Murugashankari has performed this art since 2000 across India and in other countries.

== Early life ==
Murugashankari hails from a family of artistes. Her father Leo Prabu is a veteran dramatist, television personality and a yesteryear actor in Tamil movies who has played pivotal roles in a number of Tamil films like Rendum Rendum Anju, Naan Mahaan Alla, Annae Annae, Paer Sollum Pillai etc. He is the recipient of ‘Kalaimamani’, the highest state award by the government of Tamil Nadu for Tamil Theater. His achievements as an actor is well known in Tamil Nadu, India.

== Education ==
Murugashankari is an alumnus of Adarsh Vidyalaya Matriculation Higher Secondary School in Chennai and is a university rank holder in chemical engineering from Sri Venkateswara College of Engineering. She completed her Master of Fine Arts from Kalai Kaviri College of Fine Arts, Trichy. She has been awarded the junior research fellowship from UGC, India to pursue her PhD. She also holds a postgraduate diploma in business administration from Symbiosis, Pune.

== Dance career ==
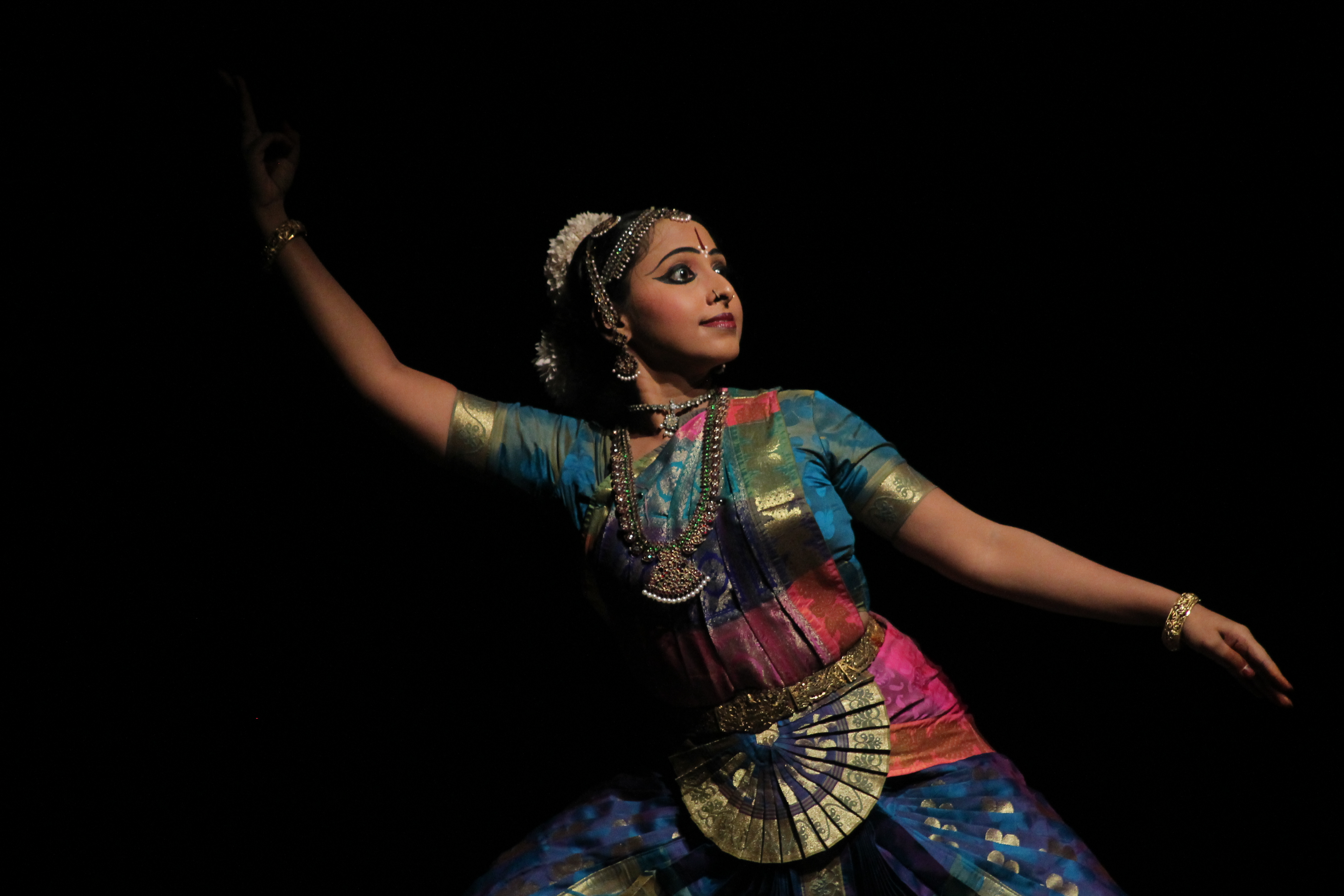
Performance in Bangalore

According to the Guru-Shishya Parampara, Murugashankari started learning Bharatanatyam at the age of 5 from the legendary dance teacher ‘Kalaimamani’ K.J.Sarasa. Later, she completed her Arangetram (debut performance) under the guidance of the illustrious teacher ‘Kalaimamani’ Parvathi Ravi Ghantasala. A chemical engineer by education, Murugashankari made the conscious decision of pursuing her passion and following her dreams of becoming a full-time artiste. She completed her Masters in Bharatanatyam from the Bharathidasan University and is now a research scholar.

=== Awards and credentials ===
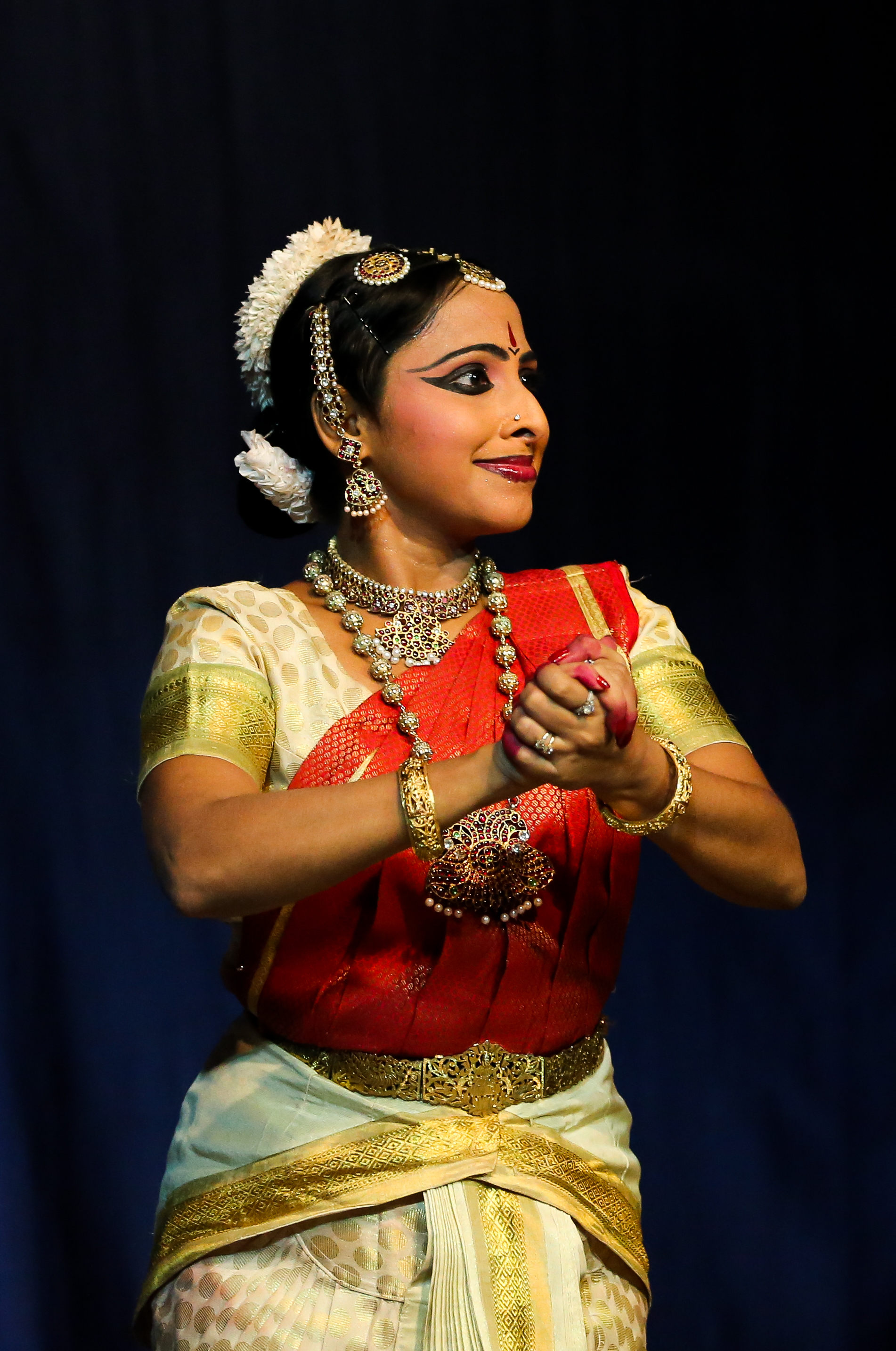
In Hyderabad

- Graded artiste of Chennai Doordarshan
- "WORLD DANCE DAY PURASKAR" by Natraj Music and Dance academy, Member of International dance council UNESCO, Visakhapatnam.
- Was honoured with the title 'Naattiya Thilagam' in Selangor, Malaysia.

== Theater actor ==
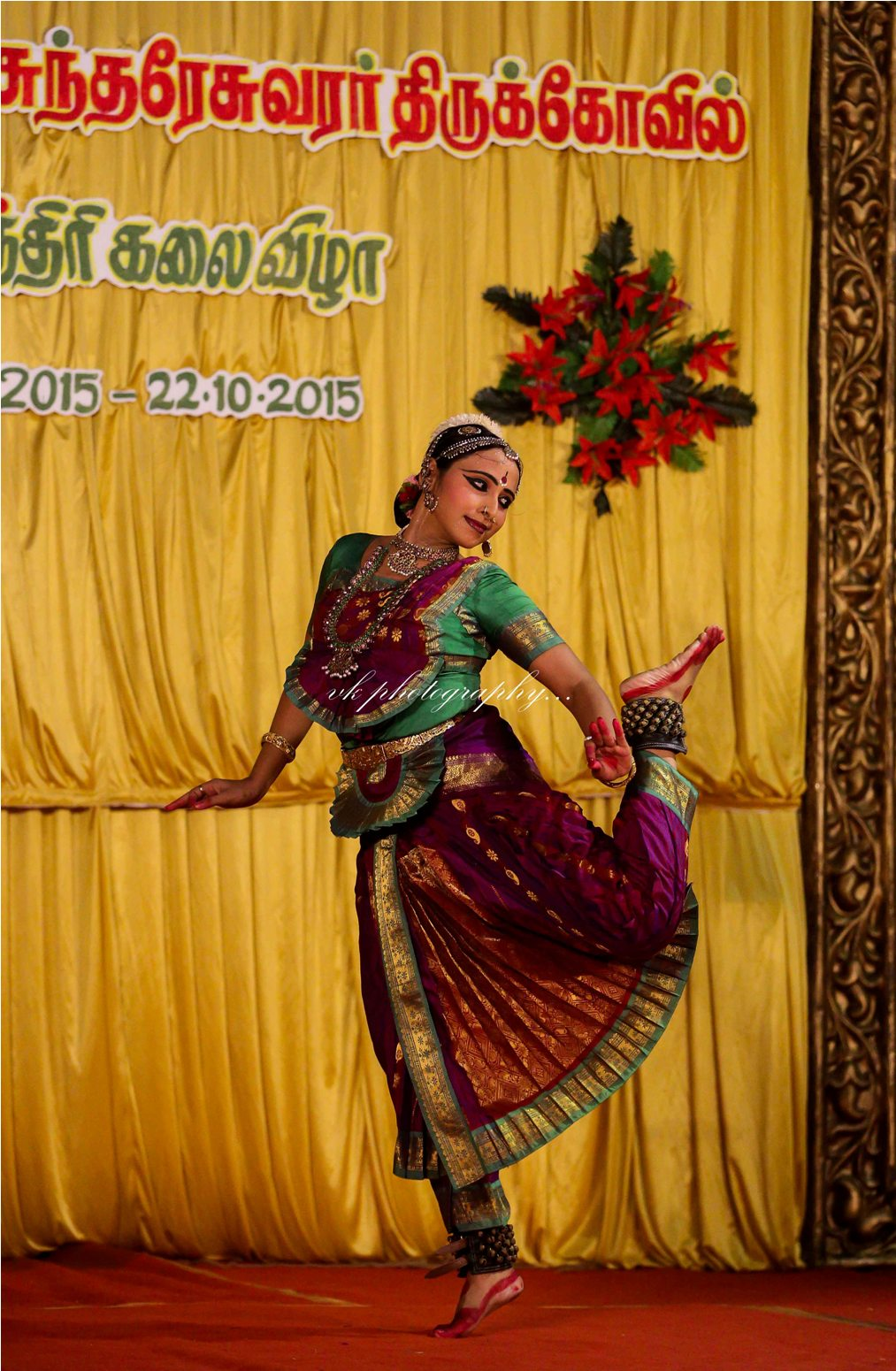
During a performance at Madurai Meenakshi Amman Temple

Murugashankari played the lead in Stage Image's latest Tamil Drama Neruppu Kolangal. This play was very well received in Chennai, with articles in the press commending the play and Murugashankari's acting in it. This play incorporates in it, the classical dance and a song both rendered by Murugashankari which is its unique attraction.
