= Naagam (1985 film) =

- Title card
- Directed by: Chozha Rajan
- Written by: Rama Narayanan
- Produced by: N. Radha
- Starring: Ambika; Chandrasekhar; Radha Ravi
- Cinematography: W. R. Chandran
- Edited by: Gowthaman
- Music by: Shankar–Ganesh
- Production company: Thaenaandaal Films
- Release date: 23 February 1985
- Running time: 130 minutes
- Country: India
- Language: Tamil

Naagam (transl. Cobra) is a 1985 Indian Tamil-language action thriller film, directed by Chozha Rajan and written by Rama Narayanan. The film stars Ambika, Chandrasekhar and Radha Ravi. It was released on 23 February 1985.

== Cast ==
- Ambika as Janaki
- Chandrasekhar
- Radha Ravi as Ravi
- Arjun as CID officer
- Sasikala as Gowri
- S. S. Chandran
- Kallapetti Singaram as Velu
- Anuradha
- Sunitha
- Gundu Kalyanam
- V. K. Ramasamy (guest appearance)

== Soundtrack ==
The music was composed by Shankar–Ganesh, with lyrics by Vaali.

Song	Singers	Length
"Thenandal"	P. Susheela	05:18
"Chinna Nila"	Vani Jairam	04:49
"Amma Ammamma"	S. P. Sailaja	04:16
"Oothungada"	Latha	04:11
