= 16 Vayathinile (soundtrack) =

1977 soundtrack album by Ilaiyaraaja

- Original album cover

Soundtrack album by Ilaiyaraaja
- Released: 1977
- Genre: Feature film soundtrack
- Length: 16:53
- Language: Tamil
- Labels: EMI Records & Saregama
- Producer: Ilaiyaraaja

Ilaiyaraaja chronology
Bhuvana Oru Kelvi Kuri (1977)	16 Vayathinile (1977)	Gaayathri (1977)

16 Vayathinile is the soundtrack album for the 1977 film of the same name directed by Bharathiraja in his debut film and stars Rajinikanth, Kamal Haasan and Sridevi in the lead roles. The soundtrack and background score for the film is composed by Ilaiyaraaja and featured lyrics written by Kannadasan, Gangai Amaran and Alangudi Somu. It was released under the EMI Records label.

== Development ==
16 Vayathinile was Ilaiyaraaja's maiden collaboration with Bharathiraja, Rajinikanth and Haasan. Bharathiraja insisted that Rajkannu had met Ilaiyaraaja, although Rajkannu was skeptical on whether he would sign on due to Ilaiyaraaja's popularity after his debut film Annakili (1976). Ilaiyaraaja initially refused the offer because of an earlier bet with Bharathiraja that Ilaiyaraaja's mentor, G. K. Venkatesh, would compose the music for Bharathiraja's first film. But, Venkatesh insisted Ilaiyaraaja to score the film. Ilaiyaraaja, in an April 2015 interview with Maalai Malar, stated that lyricist Kannadasan accepted salaries ranging from ₹1,000 to ₹1,500, and he requested him to accept ₹750 citing the film's budget constraints, to which Kannadasan agreed.

The soundtrack combines with folk and Western classical music, using Viennese musical tropes, according to film critic Baradwaj Rangan. The first song to be recorded for the film was "Chavanthi Poo"; initially Ilaiyaraaja wanted S. P. Balasubrahmanyam to sing "Chavanthi Poo" and "Aattukkutti", but as Balasubrahmanyam had been diagnosed with pharyngitis, he was replaced by Malaysia Vasudevan.

Gangai Amaran debuted as lyricist with "Chendoora Poove". The term "Chendoora Poove", which refers to a flower, was coined by Amaran since there is no such flower by that name. Ilaiyaraaja debuted as a singer with this film by singing "Solam Vidhaikkaiyile", although it does not appear on the original soundtrack.

== Track listing ==
No.	Title	Lyrics	Singer(s)	Length
1.	"Manjakkulichi"	Alangudi Somu	S. Janaki	4:26
2.	"Chendoora Poove"	Gangai Amaran	S. Janaki	3:33
3.	"Aattukkutti"	Kannadasan	Malaysia Vasudevan, S. Janaki	4:20
4.	"Chavanthi Poo"	Kannadasan	Malaysia Vasudevan, P. Susheela	4:34
5.	"Solam Vethaikayile"	Kannadasan	Ilayaraaja	2:41
Total length:				16:53

== Reception ==
The soundtrack was critically acclaimed, with B. Kolappan of The Hindu regarding the song "Chendoora Poove" wrote that it "employs a rush of violins to set up the intro for the folk melody that follows." Critic based at Film Focus article in Tribune described the song as "silver lined melody that paced the film and added to its brilliance". Ananda Vikatan's review for the film described Ilaiyaraaja's music as "sweet to the ears". Swarnavel Eswaran Pillai, who researched on the trends of Tamil cinema in the 1970s, reviewed 16 Vayadhinile and added that Ilaiyaraaja's "ability to draw from composers like [Johann Sebastian] Bach to the very specific folk music of the narrative locale" on the compositions, were instrumental in the film's success. He also appreciated Bharathiraja for the visualization of the songs through his "unique style of repeated entry of faces in close-ups, freeze-frame shots, and symmetrical reversing of movement". The song "Aattukkutti" established Vasudevan's popularity.

== Accolades ==
Award	Category	Recipient(s)	Result	Ref.
National Film Awards	Best Female Playback Singer	S. Janaki	Won	
Tamil Nadu State Film Awards	Best Music Director	Ilaiyaraaja	Won	
Tamil Nadu State Film Awards	Best Female Playback Singer	S. Janaki	Won	

== Other versions ==
The album was later remastered in DTS 5.1 surround sound by A. Muthusamy of Honey Bee Music in June 2013. The background score was retained in the Telugu dubbed version Neekosam Neereekshana.
