= Kalyana Agathigal =

- Theatrical release poster
- Directed by: K. Balachander
- Written by: K. Balachander
- Produced by: Rajam Balachander; Pushpa Kandaswamy
- Starring: Saritha
- Cinematography: R. Raghunatha Reddy
- Edited by: N. R. Kittu
- Music by: V. S. Narasimhan
- Production company: Kavithalayaa Productions
- Release date: 13 April 1985
- Running time: 148 minutes
- Country: India
- Language: Tamil

Kalyana Agathigal (transl. Refugees of marriage) is a 1985 Indian Tamil-language film directed by K. Balachander. The film stars Saritha and was released on 13 April 1985. The film marked the acting debut of Nassar.

== Plot ==
The film begins with a group of six women who live together as friends after their attempt at living a successful married life is thwarted due to various reasons, majorly because of men, sexual abuse, dowry harassment, forced conversion and the backward society. They also form a music band called "Kalyana Agathigal" to raise funds for charity to the underprivileged. Ammulu, a young runaway girl, joins the gang of girls and becomes a part of the household. The story is about how their lives make wild twists and turns as they cope with the society and try to find true love.

== Cast ==
- Saritha as Ammulu
- Ashok as Robert
- Y. Vijaya as Thangam
- Vanitha Krishnachandran as Yesodha
- Kuyili as Hemalatha
- Lalitha Mani as Premalatha
- Nisha Noor as Saira
- J. Lalitha as Sumangali
- Akalya as Thamizharasi
- Seema as Valliammai
- Raveendran as Ambikapathy
- Delhi Ganesh as Ammulu's father
- Poornam Viswanathan as Robert's father
- T. S. Babumohan as Gurumoorthy
- Charle
- Nassar as Kannayiram

== Soundtrack ==
The music was composed by V. S. Narasimhan and lyrics were written by Vairamuthu.

Track listing
No.	Title	Singer(s)	Length
1.	"Kalyana Agathigal"	P. Susheela, chorus
2.	"Manasukkul"	P. Susheela, Raj Sitaraman
3.	"Varavendum"	Susheela, Aruna, chorus
4.	"Adi Alligale"	Malaysia Vasudevan, Kausalya
5.	"Kaanal Alaigalile"	P. Susheela

== Release and reception ==
Kalyana Agathigal was released on 13 April 1985, and failed commercially. Jayamanmadhan of Kalki wrote whether the film runs or runs away, Balachander's bravery will stand.
