= Leo Prabhu =

Indian dramatist (1933–2023)

- Born: Leo; 1933; Coimbatore, British India
- Died: 30 December 2023 (aged 90)
- Occupations: Dramatist, actor, writer
- Years active: 1950–2023
- Spouse: Usha Prabhu
- Children: Murugashankari Leo
- Website: kalaikoodam.org

Leo Prabhu (1933 – 30 December 2023) was an Indian dramatist, playwright and novelist from the state of Tamil Nadu. He started his career as an actor at the Boys Company and has worked in the Tamil theater for many years. After founding his own troupe, called Stage Image, he shot to fame. His service and contribution to Tamil theatre are well recognised by the Tamils across the world. He is regarded as one of the finest actors, writers and playwrights and The Tamil Nadu Government conferred on him the highest State award, Kalaimamani in 1990.

== Biography ==
Born in Coimbatore, Prabu was passionate about football and acting since childhood. Acting prevailed, and he became a dramatist, media person, and author. His area of expertise can be broadly classified as an actor (theater, tele-serials and cinema), director (tele-serials, theatre plays) and writer (screenplay, dialogue and novels).

Prabhu died on 30 December 2023, at the age of 90.

== Partial filmography ==
Year	Film	Language	Role	Notes
1974	Paruva Kaalam	Tamil		
1983	Idhu Enga Naadu	Tamil		
1983	Anney Anney	Tamil		
1984	Naan Mahaan Alla	Tamil	Logu	
1986	Puthir	Tamil		
1987	Per Sollum Pillai	Tamil		
1988	Rendum Rendum Anju	Tamil		

== Links ==
- thehindu.com Review of Leo Prabhu's recent play in THE HINDU'S Friday Review dated 17 April 2014.
- thehindu.com
- https://antrukandamugam.wordpress.com/2015/07/21/leo-prabhu/. Biography of the actor
- http://www.kalaikoodam.org/ Official website
