= Ragavan =

- Directed by: Parandhaman
- Produced by: Aghyna Productions; M Selvaraj
- Starring: Vijith; Radhika Malhotra; Manoj K. Jayan; Singamuthu; Mayilsamy; Santhana Bharathi
- Cinematography: M Kavin
- Edited by: B. Lenin
- Music by: Gangai Amaran
- Release date: 12 June 2009
- Country: India
- Language: Tamil

Ragavan is a 2009 Tamil language film, starring debutants Vijith and Radhika Malhotra, produced under a new banner Aghyna Productions by M Selvaraj and directed by Parandhaman who was an assistant to film director Selvaraghavan. After a long time Gangai Amaran is composing the music for this film. The audio CD was released on 14 February 2009 coinciding with Valentine's Day. The movie was released on 12 June 2009.

== Cast ==
- Vijith as Ragavan
- Radhika Malhotra as Dhivya
- Manoj K. Jayan as Lakshmipathi
- Singamuthu
- Mayilsamy
- Santhana Bharathi
- Munnar Ramesh

== Soundtrack ==
Ragavan

Soundtrack album by Gangai Amaran
- Released: 14 February 2009
- Genre: Film soundtrack
- Label: BGM's Audios 'nd' Videos
- Producer: Aghyna Productions

The soundtrack consists of seven songs composed by Gangai Amaran.

No.	Song	Singers	Lyrics	Notes
1	"Parthal"	Maya	Na. Muthukumar	
2	"Kannadi"	Sendil Dos, Priyadharshini	Na. Muthukumar	
3	"Sithanna"	Haricharan, Anuradha Sriram	Na. Muthukumar	
4	"Vazhvai"	Gangai Amaran	Gangai Amaran	
5	"Yaarum"	Shyam, Maya	Parandhaman	
6	"Ooththura"	Premji Amaran, Suchitra	Na. Muthukumar	
7	"Kudimagane" (Re-Mix)	Sendil Dos, Priyadharshini	Kannadasan	
