= Velachery Assembly constituency =

State Legislative Assembly Constituency in Tamil Nadu

Velachery
- Constituency No. 26 for the Tamil Nadu Legislative Assembly

Constituency details
- Country: India
- Region: South India
- State: Tamil Nadu
- District: Chennai
- Lok Sabha constituency: Chennai South
- Established: 2008
- Total electors: 2,17,208

Member of Legislative Assembly
- 17th Tamil Nadu Legislative Assembly
- Incumbent R. Kumar
- Party: TVK
- Alliance: TVK+
- Elected year: 2026

Velachery is a state assembly constituency in Tamil Nadu, India, that was formed after constituency delimitation in 2008. Its State Assembly Constituency number is 26. It forms a part of Chennai South Lok Sabha constituency for national elections. It is one of the 234 State Legislative Assembly Constituencies in Tamil Nadu.

== Members of Legislative Assembly ==
Year	Member	Political party
2011	M. K. Ashok	All India Anna Dravida Munnetra Kazhagam
2016	Vagai Chandrasekhar	Dravida Munnetra Kazhagam
2021	J. M. H. Aassan Maulaana	Indian National Congress
2026	R. Kumar	Tamilaga Vettri Kazhagam

== Election results ==
Vote share of winning candidates
2026	43.52%
2021	39.15%
2016	39.96%
2011	53.91%

=== 2026 ===
2026 Tamil Nadu Legislative Assembly election: Velachery
Party	Candidate	Votes	%	±%
TVK	R. Kumar	80,430	43.52	New
AIADMK	M. K. Ashok	47,125	25.50	▼11.16
INC	J. M. H. Aassan Maulaana	45,928	24.85	▼14.30
NTK	Keerthana. M	7,697	4.16	▼3.94
NOTA	NOTA	1,336	0.72	▼0.28
Margin of victory		33,305	18.02	▲15.53
Turnout		1,84,815	85.09	▲29.46
Registered electors		2,17,208		▼97,329
TVK gain from INC		Swing	▲43.52	

=== 2021 ===
2021 Tamil Nadu Legislative Assembly election: Velachery
Party	Candidate	Votes	%	±%
INC	J. M. H. Aassan Maulaana	68,493	39.15	New
AIADMK	M. K. Ashok	64,141	36.66	+1.75
MNM	Santhosh Babu	23,072	13.19	New
NTK	M. Keerthana	14,171	8.10	+5.81
AMMK	M. Chandrabose	1,977	1.13	New
NOTA	NOTA	1,742	1.00	−1.41
Margin of victory		4,352	2.49	−2.57
Turnout		174,972	55.63	−2.71
Rejected ballots		70	0.04	
Registered electors		314,537		
INC gain from DMK		Swing	-0.82	

=== 2016 ===
2016 Tamil Nadu Legislative Assembly election: Velachery
Party	Candidate	Votes	%	±%
DMK	Vagai Chandrasekhar	70,139	39.96	New
AIADMK	C. Munusamy	61,267	34.91	−19.01
BJP	P. Sritharan	14,472	8.25	+3.62
DMDK	V. N. Rajan	9,654	5.50	New
PMK	Vinoba Bhoopathy	6,809	3.88	−29.22
NOTA	NOTA	4,225	2.41	New
NTK	N. Chandrasekaran	4,011	2.29	New
Independent	Raja Krishnamoorthy @ Kitty	2,477	1.41	New
Margin of victory		8,872	5.05	−15.76
Turnout		175,522	58.33	−8.71
Registered electors		300,891		
DMK gain from AIADMK		Swing	-13.95	

=== 2011 ===
2011 Tamil Nadu Legislative Assembly election: Velachery
Party	Candidate	Votes	%	±%
AIADMK	M. K. Ashok	82,145	53.91	New
PMK	M. Jayaraman	50,425	33.10	New
Independent	E. Sarathbabu	7,472	4.90	New
BJP	Dr. Tamilisai Soundararajan	7,048	4.63	New
Loktantrik Samajwadi	Senthil Kumar Arumugam	1,225	0.80	New
IJK	K. N. Seshadri	1,036	0.68	New
Margin of victory		31,720	20.82	
Turnout		152,364	67.05	
Registered electors		227,249		
AIADMK win (new seat)				
