= Kurukshetram (2006 film) =

- Poster
- Directed by: Jayabharathi
- Written by: Jayabharathi
- Produced by: K. M. Rajendra
- Starring: Sathyaraj; Roja; Vadivelu; K. M. Rajendra
- Cinematography: A. Karuppaya
- Edited by: Suresh Urs
- Music by: Isaac Thomas Kottukapally
- Production company: Rajendra Movies
- Release date: 11 August 2006
- Running time: 130 minutes
- Country: India
- Language: Tamil

Kurukshetram is a 2006 Indian Tamil language film directed by director Jayabharathi, starring Sathyaraj, Roja, Vadivelu, and K. M. Rajendra. The music for this film was scored by Isaac Thomas Kottukapally. The film is produced by K. M. Rajendra under the banner Rajendra Movies. The cinematography and editing for this film were done by A. Karuppaya and Suresh Urs respectively. Kurukshetram is Sathyaraj's 170th film. The film released on 11 August 2006.

The comedy sequences in which Vadivelu instructs how to make an uttapam became viral upon release.

== Plot ==
Bharath and his wife Vaishnavi live in Western America with their children Subash and Sindu. Riots break out in the part of America where Bharath and his family live, during which their daughter Sindu dies in a bomb blast. After Sindu's death, Vaishnavi falls ill, so Bharath decides to shift to Chennai along with his family. Even after going to Chennai, Bharath and his family are not living happily because Bharath's friend Jack is torturing Bharath's family by blackmailing Vaishnavi. The flashback in the film reveals why Jack threatens Vaishnavi.

== Cast ==
- Sathyaraj as Bharath
- Roja as Vaishnavi
- Vadivelu as Nondippuli
- K. M. Rajendra as Jack
- Nizhalgal Ravi as Kailash
- Thalaivasal Vijay as Westerner
- Bharathi Mani as Tambu
- Master Sachin as Subash, Bharath's son
- Hemalatha as Sindhu, Bharath's daughter
- Vennira Aadai Moorthy as a booth and restaurant owner
- S. N. Parvathy as Nondippuli's mother
- Singamuthu as Share autorickshaw driver
- Thambi Ramaiah as Head constable
- Vijay Ganesh as Police constable
- Vengal Rao as Man in a temple
- Bava Lakshmanan as Moneylender
- Halwa Vasu as Hotel waiter
- Citizen Mani as Restaurant customer
- Amirthalingam as Pandi, restaurant customer
- Bonda Mani as the owner of "Hotel Doobakoor" restaurant
- Telephone Raj as the owner of "Hotel Doobakoor" restaurant
- Ramya in a special appearance

== Soundtrack ==
The music is composed by Isaac Thomas Kottukapally.

Track listing
No.	Title	Length
1.	"Kathadicha"
2.	"Kattipudi Kattipudi"
3.	"Maname"
4.	"Panipookkam"
5.	"Priya Priyathamma"

== Reception ==
Malathi Rangarajan of The Hindu wrote, "In an effort to appease the masses and the minuscule class that craves for meaningful cinema, Jayabharathy's film ends up being neither here nor there". Chennai Online wrote, "The story begins in an interesting manner but then deteriorates". Tamil Star wrote, "Kurukshethram ends up neither as meaningful cinema nor as a commercial entertainer. It is just another opportunity lost".
