= Nisha Noor =

Indian actress (1962–2007)

- Born: Nisha Noor; 18 September 1962; Nagapattinam, Tamil Nadu, India
- Died: 23 April 2007 (aged 44); Tambaram, Chennai, Tamil Nadu, India
- Occupation: Actress
- Years active: 1979-1990
- Works: "Tik Tik Tik", "Iyer The Great"

Nisha Noor (1962–2007) was an Indian actress. She was mainly active in Tamil and Malayalam films. She also acted in few Telugu and Kannada as well.

== Career ==
Noor had notable roles in films such as Kalyana Agathigal (1986) and Iyer the Great (1990). She also appeared in the films Tik Tik Tik (1981), Chuvappu Naada, Mimics Action 500, and Inimai Idho Idho.

== Decline and death ==
Noor was forced into prostitution by a producer. Noor died in 2007 from AIDS-related complications.

== Partial filmography ==
=== Tamil ===
- Ponnu Oorukku Pudhusu (1979)
- Mangala Nayagi (1980)
- Muyalakku Moonu Kaal (1980)
- Ilamai Kolam (1980)
- Enakkaga Kaathiru (1981)
- Tik Tik Tik (1981)
- Manamadurai Malli (1982)
- Inimai Idho Idho (1983)
- Aval Sumangalithan (1985)...Stella
- Sri Raghavendrar (1985)
- Kalyana Agathigal (1986)
- Aval Oru Vasantham (1992)

=== Malayalam ===
- Veliyettam (1981)
- Chuvappu Naada (1990)
- Mimics Parade (1990)
- Iyer the Great (1990)
- Devasuram (1993)
