= Tamilisai Soundararajan =

2nd Governor of Telangana & Lieutenant Governor of Puducherry

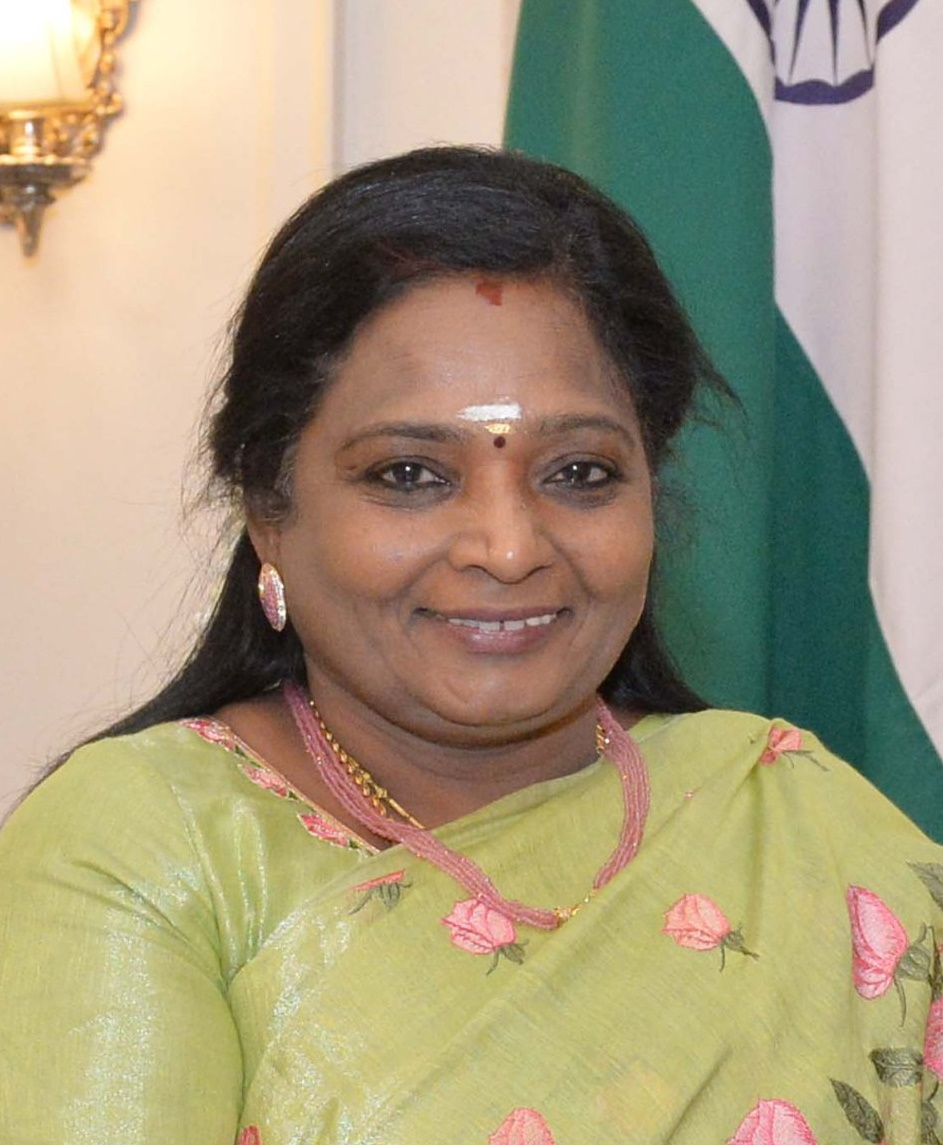

2nd Governor of Telangana
- In office 8 September 2019 – 19 March 2024
- Chief Minister: K. Chandrasekhar Rao; Anumula Revanth Reddy
- Preceded by: E. S. L. Narasimhan
- Succeeded by: C. P. Radhakrishnan (additional charge)

Lieutenant Governor of Puducherry
- (Additional Charge)
- In office 18 February 2021 – 19 March 2024
- Chief Minister: V. Narayanasamy; N. Rangaswamy
- Preceded by: Kiran Bedi
- Succeeded by: C. P. Radhakrishnan (additional charge)

10th President of Bharatiya Janata Party, Tamil Nadu
- In office 16 August 2014 – 1 September 2019
- Preceded by: Pon Radhakrishnan
- Succeeded by: L. Murugan

Personal details
- Born: 2 June 1961 (age 65) Kaliyikkavila, Madras State, India (present-day Tamil Nadu)
- Party: Bharatiya Janata Party
- Spouse: P. Soundararajan
- Children: 2
- Parent: Kumari Ananthan (Father) Kumari Krishna (Mother) Vasanthakumar (Paternal Uncle)
- Education: Madras Medical College (MBBS)
- Profession: Physician; politician

Tamilisai Soundararajan (born 2 June 1961) is an Indian politician who belongs to Bharatiya Janata Party. She served as the second Governor of Telangana from 2019 until 2024. She also served as Lieutenant Governor of Puducherry (Additional charge). She was the National Secretary and Tamil Nadu State Unit President of the BJP prior to this appointment.

Tamilisai Soundararajan resigned from the posts as Governor of Telangana and Lieutenant Governor of Puducherry on 18 March 2024 and rejoined BJP in the presence of Tamil Nadu BJP President K. Annamalai, Union Minister G. Kishan Reddy, Union Minister of State L. Murugan on 20 March 2024.

== Personal life and education ==
She was born in Kaliyakkavilai, Kanyakumari, Tamil Nadu on 2 June 1961. Her father Kumari Ananthan, was a former Member of Parliament and a senior Indian National Congress leader in Tamil Nadu. Whereas, her husband, Soundararajan, is a medical doctor.

She graduated from Ethiraj College for Women, pursued her MB BS at Madras Medical College, Chennai and her obstetrics and gynaecology qualifications at Dr. MGR Medical University, Chennai. She was trained in sonology and frozen embryo transfer therapy at the University of Toronto and The Hospital for Sick Children in Toronto, Canada.

Prior to political commitment she worked as an assistant professor at Ramachandra Medical College, Chennai for 5 years. She has two children.

In recognition of her dedicated service to the society and general public and promoting gender equality women empowerment, she was awarded “ International Rising Star of the Year – 2018” by multi ethnic advisory task force, USA operating under US Congressman Danny K. Davis.

== Political career ==
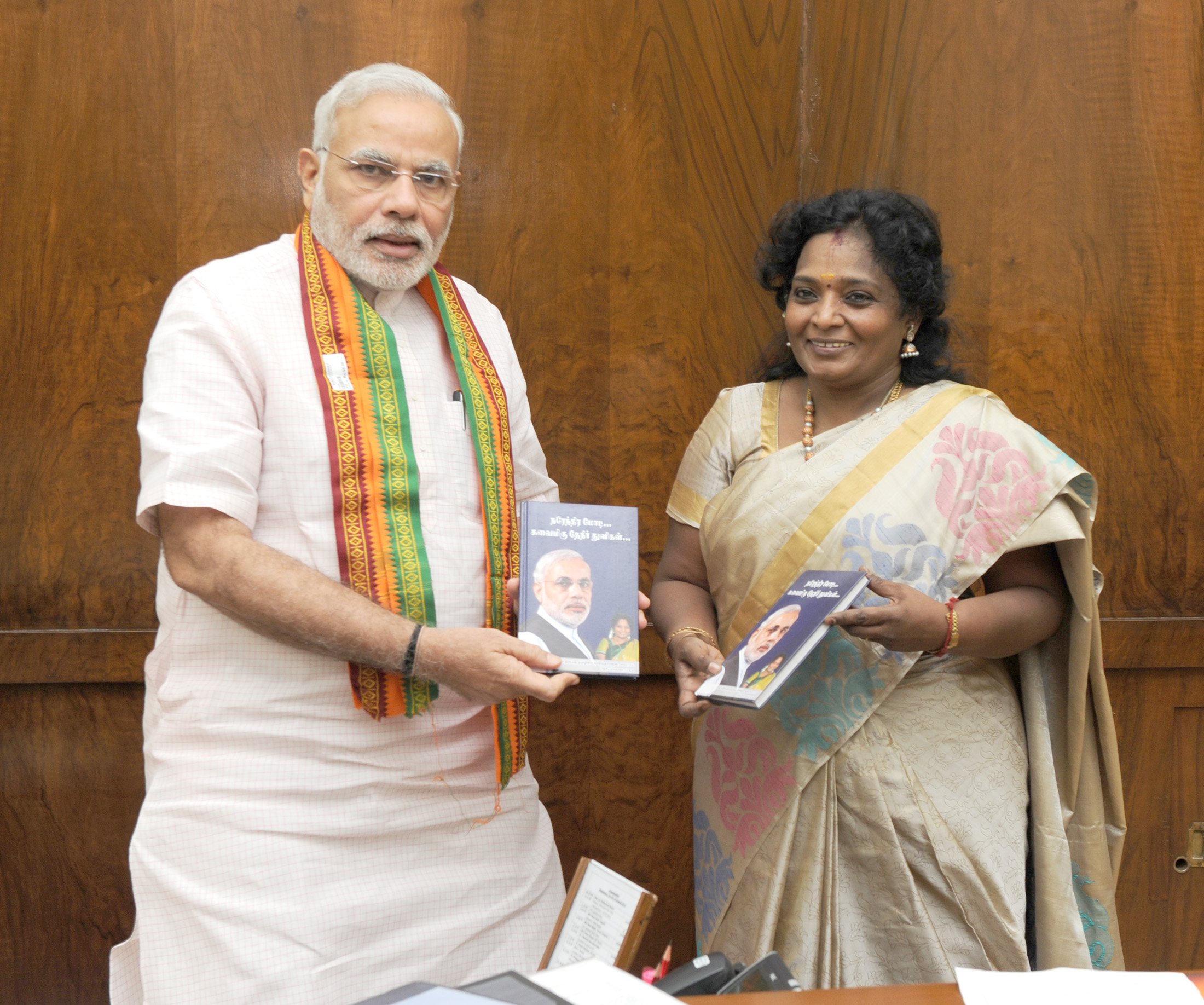
Soundararajan presenting books to Prime Minister Narendra Modi

Tamilisai Soundararajan became interested in politics from childhood, having been brought up in a political family. She was elected as a student leader during her studies at Madras Medical College. She served the Tamil Nadu state BJP unit in various capacities starting from South Chennai District Medical Wing Secretary in 1999, State General Secretary Medical Wing in 2001, All India Co-Convenor (Medical Wing For Southern States) in 2005, State General Secretary in 2007, State Vice-President in 2010 and elevated as National Secretary, All India BJP in 2013.

She was appointed the Governor of Telangana on 1 September 2019 by the order of the President of India, Ram Nath Kovind and currently is also 1st woman to hold the office of the state. She took charge as Governor of Telangana on 9 September 2019. She was given additional charge of Puducherry (union territory) on 16 February 2021 and is fifth woman to hold the office of the Union Territory. During the COVID-19 pandemic she visited healthcare workers in hospitals and encouraged vaccination.

Tamilisai Soundararajan has lost in all her attempts at becoming an MP or MLA to date, having contested two Assembly elections and Parliament elections unsuccessfully. In the 2019 Indian general election, she lost against Kanimozhi Karunanidhi, daughter of former chief minister of Tamil Nadu M. Karunanidhi from Thoothukkudi. She extensively campaigned in parliament and assembly elections across the state.

== Media ==
She conducted a programme promoting the oratory skills for students and children, which was broadcast on the Tamil channel Raj TV for more than 10 years. She conducted a weekly programme for women in Doordarshan Channel which was aired as Magalir Panchayat (Women's Court) for over 5 years. She participated in several political debates against other political leaders including Sun TV, NDTV, Times Now and various local channels.

== Elections Contested ==
=== Lok Sabha Elections ===
Year	Constituency	Party	Result	Votes %	Opponent		Votes %
2009	Chennai North	BJP	Lost	3.54	DMK	T. K. S. Elangovan	42.59
2019	Thoothukkudi	BJP	Lost	21.77	DMK	Kanimozhi Rajathi Karunanidhi	56.77
2024	Chennai South	BJP	Lost	26.43	DMK	Thamizhachi Thangapandian	46.97

=== Legislative Assembly Elections ===
Year	Constituency	Party	Result	Votes %	Opponent		Votes %
2006	Radhapuram	BJP	Lost	4.70	DMK	M. Appavu	43.36
2011	Velachery	BJP	Lost	4.63	AIADMK	M. K. Ashok	53.91
2016	Virugampakkam	BJP	Lost	11.19	AIADMK	Virugai V. N. Ravi	38.51
2026	Mylapore	BJP	Lost	21.47	TVK	P. Venkataramanan	46.53

== Positions ==
=== Women's rights ===
Tamilisai Soundararajan is a supporter of the #metoo movement and has emphasised that any woman who had faced sexual harassment should get justice.

=== Temple management ===
Tamilisai Soundararajan has asserted that temples must be managed by committees formed of devotees of the temple and consist of theists.

=== Telangana Governor ===
Dr. Tamilisai Soundararajan was sworn in as the first woman Governor of Telangana in the year 2019, replacing the post held by E.S.L. Narasimhan. She's the second governor of the State of Telangana, which was formed on 2 June 2014. She's the youngest among all state governors. To explore the resources among alumni, an online portal called 'Chancellor Connect' was created.

==== As a Governor ====
Raj Bhavan under Dr. Tamilisai Soundararajan, in association with Telangana State Council of Higher Education (TSCHE), instituted 'Chancellor's Awards' for best teachers, best research, and best university in academic social responsibility.

Dr. Tamilisai organised meetings in association with the National Institute of Nutrition (NIN), Hyderabad, to create a detailed action plan for formulating an appropriate nutrition intervention program for Telangana's tribal communities.

In April 2023, the Telangana Government filed a writ petition in the supreme court against Tamilisai Soundararajan for failing to provide her assent for 10 bills nearly seven months after the state legislature had passed them.

Tamilisai Soundararajan resigned from both posts Telangana Governor and Puducherry Lieutenant-Governor on 18 March 2024 ahead of 2024 Loksabha Elections. She contested in the 2024 Indian general elections from Chennai South constituency in Tamil Nadu.

=== Lt. Governor of Puducherry ===
Dr. Tamilisai Soundararajan was sworn in as Lt. Governor of Puducherry (additional charge ) on 18 February 2021. Chief Justice of Madras High court Justice Sanjeeb Banerjee administered the oath of office and secrecy to her. Tamilisai took the oath in Tamil and tendered her resignation on 18 March 2024.

Political offices
Preceded by E. S. L. Narasimhan	Governor of Telangana; 8 September 2019 – 19 March 2024	Succeeded by C. P. Radhakrishnan
Preceded by Kiran Bedi	28th Lieutenant Governor of Puducherry; 18 February 2021 – 19 March 2024	Succeeded by C. P. Radhakrishnan
