= Nanba Nanba =

- Directed by: Jayabharathi
- Written by: Ravindhran Ramamoorthy; Jayabharathi
- Produced by: Raja Vaidyanathan
- Starring: Charle; Chandrasekhar
- Cinematography: Ramesh Vyas
- Edited by: Suresh Urs
- Music by: Chittey Prakash
- Production company: Media Works
- Release date: 27 December 2002
- Running time: 110 minutes
- Country: India
- Language: Tamil

Nanba Nanba (transl. Friend, my dear friend) is a 2002 Indian Tamil-language drama film directed by Jayabharathi, starring Charle and Chandrasekhar. The film was released on 27 December 2002 and received critical acclaim; Chandrasekhar won the National Film Award for Best Supporting Actor.

== Plot ==
Lawrence and Joseph are two orphans brought up by Father Kirupakaran. They are best of friends and both become teachers in a school and live in the same house. One fateful day, they meet with an accident and Lawrence becomes a quadriplegic, with no movement below hip, due to multiple injuries in his spinal cord. Life comes to a standstill for Lawrence and he is restricted to his bed. Joseph starts taking care of Lawrence and Joseph's help is needed to even perform his daily essential chores. Joseph continues teaching and Lawrence brings out a literary magazine, which does not sell much but gives him satisfaction of writing and doing something useful for others.

Lawrence feels lonely and longs to see the outside world and live like a normal person. He spends most of his time watching television and his only consolation is the daily visit by Janani, a young girl, who comes for tuition with him. A noisy neighbourhood gives him the opportunity to know the problems of that family and urges him to help in their demanding situation. Joseph thinks of sending Lawrence abroad for treatment, but doctors inform that Lawrence cannot be cured. One day, the neighbourhood family vacates the house and Lawrence's window to the world is shut down.

Lawrence advertises for a good proposal for Joseph in a matrimonial column — though the latter turns down the opportunity to look after Lawrence. Lawrence gets upset and tries to commit suicide so Joseph can get married. He gets admitted to a hospital and recovers, and Joseph agrees to marriage ad long as he can continue to take care of his friend. Edward (Bala Singh, the bride Lucy (Rindhya)'s father, likes Joseph but does not like the deal to care for Lawrence. However, Lucy comes and meets Lawrence and gives her consent for the marriage and cites that she will also help look after Lawrence.

== Cast ==
- Charle as Joseph
- Chandrasekhar as Lawrence
- Bala Singh as Edwards
- Rindhya as Lucy
- 'Bharathi' Mani as Kirupakaran
- Shwetha as Janani
- Ramadoss
- Julie

== Production ==
The story of the film is by Ravindran Ramamurthy, the brother of director Jayabharathi. He had initially requested the National Film Development Corporation of India to produce the film, but their process took four years and they also subsequently rejected the film. Following the negative response, he wrote to hundred people asking them to give him 5000 rupees to make the film. Raja Vaidyanathan's DreamWorks studio offered to produce the film. Charlee and Chandrasekhar did not take any money for the project, while Ramesh Prasad of Prasad Studios lent Jayabharathi post-production material for free.

Shot in 16 mm in 13 days and then made 35 mm, Nanba Nanba was made on a shoestring budget of ₹6 lakh (worth ₹45 lakh in 2021 prices).

== Release and reception ==
Despite garnering critical acclaim, the film did not perform well at the box office and had taken a low profile opening. Chandrasekhar won the National Film Award for Best Supporting Actor.
