= Pavalar Varadharajan =

Indian musician

- Born: c. 1930; Pannaipuram, Madura District, Madras Presidency, British India (now in Theni District, Tamil Nadu, India)
- Died: 2 December 1973 (aged 42-44); Madurai, Tamil Nadu, India
- Years active: 1949-1973
- Political party: Communist Party of India (1957-64); Communist Party of India (Marxist) (1964-72); Dravida Munnetra Kazhagam (1972-73)
- Spouse: Seeniyammal
- Children: 4
- Parent(s): Chinnathai (mother); Ramasamy (father)
- Relatives: Sisters * Kamalam * Padmavathi; Brothers * R. D. Bhaskar * Ilaiyaraaja * Gangai Amaran; Nieces * Bhavatharini * Vasuki Bhaskar * Vilasini (a) Haasini; Nephews * Karthik Raja * Yuvan Shankar Raja * Venkat Prabhu * Premji Amaren
- Musical career
- Genres: Carnatic music; Tamil Folk music
- Instruments: Harmonium, Vocals
- Label: Pavalar Brothers (1961-69)

Ramasamy Daniel Varadharajan, popularly known as "Pavalar" Varadharajan, was a singer, lyricist, composer, musician, and playwright from Tamil Nadu, India. He headed a musical troupe named Pavalar Brothers in the 1960s. The group consisted of his later popular brothers - R. D. Bhaskar, Ilaiyaraaja, and Gangai Amaran.

He was known for his campaigns for the Communist Party of India (CPI). When the party underwent a split in 1964, he joined its breakaway faction - CPI(M). In his last year of life, he was associated with the Dravida Munnetra Kazhagam (DMK).

== Early life ==
Varadharajan was born in Pannaipuram village (now a town in Theni district of Tamil Nadu) as the first child of Chinnathayi, who was the second wife of Ramasamy, an estate supervisor. His siblings were Kamalam, Padmavathi, R. D. Bhaskar, Ilaiyaraaja, and Gangai Amaran. He learnt music from Mariyananda Bhagavathar who was working in Trichy All India Radio station.

== Political life ==
Varadharajan 's singing talent earned him the attention of Communist leaders. During the 1958 by-election held for the Devikulam constituency of Kerala Legislative Assembly, he campaigned for Rosamma Punnoose of the Communist Party of India (CPI) by singing political songs written and composed by himself in and around the tea estates in the constituency. During the victory meeting held after Punnoose won the election, E. M. S. Namboodiripad, the then Chief Minister of Kerala, mentioned that Varadharajan was the main reason for the victory in the election. After that, Varadharajan started an orchestra singing political songs for the party and performed across various cities in India.

== Death ==
Due to health problems, Varadharajan was admitted in a hospital in Madurai and died there on 2 December 1973. His body was taken from Madurai to Pannaipuram and was buried there by his mother, brothers, and children.

=== Speculation on cause of death ===
In a January 2023 interview, Gangai Amaran was asked about the claims that Varadarajan died from injuries sustained during an assault by Communist cadre (who were allegedly irked by his defection to the DMK). Amaran reiterated what Varadarajan's wife had stated about Varadarajan being beaten, concluding without denying the claims.

== Descendants ==
Varadharajan married V. Seeniyammal sometime before 1952. The couple had four sons: Jeevadurai, Stalin Varadharajan (aka "Ilaya Gangai") Homo Jov Daniel (aka "Pavalar Mainthan"), and "Pavalar" Sivaraman. Seeniyammal died on 9 April 2020.

Stalin Varadharajan died around 2006 due to jaundice at the age of 54.

Jo, who was working as assistant director to R. V. Udayakumar, died on 15 July 2020.

Sivaraman, who was a guitarist for Ilayaraja's film commitments, died of heart failure on 2 May 2023 at the age of 60. He is survived by his wife and three children.

== In popular culture ==
In the film Chinna Pasanga Naanga (1992), the protagonist Muthukaalai (Murali) and his friends establish "Pavalar Varadharajan Mandram" to carry out reforms in their village.

The film Uthama Raasa (1993) features a song "Paavalaru Pattu" (Note: The film was scored by Ilaiyaraaja, with lyrics by Vaali.) (transl. Pavalar's song).

The song "Nattupura paatu" from the 1996 film of the same name (Note: The film was scored by Ilaiyaraaja, with lyrics written by Kasthuri Raja who was the film's director as well.) contains the line "Paavalaru varadharaasan / Paadi vecha paatu ithu" (transl. This is [a] song [once] sung by Pavalar Varadharajan).

Varadharajan is briefly portrayed in a short film on Ilaiyaraaja that premiered at Ilaiyaraaja's golden jubilee felicitation, held in Chennai by the Government of Tamil Nadu on 13 September 2025.

== Biography ==
- Padipaligalin paarvaiyil Pavalar Varadharajan (Pavalar Varadharajan in the eyes of creators) by Sangai Velavan.
- Pavalar Varadharajan Padalgal - edited by Ilayaraja.
