= Chuvappu Naada =

- Directed by: K. S. Gopalakrishnan
- Written by: J. Madhu
- Screenplay by: K. S. Gopalakrishnan
- Produced by: Ravi Raj Gupta
- Starring: Kapil Dev
- Edited by: A. Sukuraman
- Music by: S. P. Venkatesh
- Production company: VRS Movies
- Distributed by: VRS Movies
- Release date: 1990
- Country: India
- Language: Malayalam

Chuvappu Naada (transl. Red tape) is a 1990 Indian Malayalam film, directed by K. S. Gopalakrishnan. The film has musical score by S. P. Venkatesh.

== Cast ==
- Kapil Dev
- Babloo
- Nisha Noor
- Sreekumar
- Adoor Narendran
- Lalitha Sree
- Vidhiya
- K. Mani
- Sadan
- Kavitha

== Soundtrack ==
The music was composed by S. P. Venkatesh and the lyrics were written by J. Madhu.

No.	Song	Singers	Lyrics	Length (m:ss)
1	"Madhumaasaraavil"	Vani Jairam	J. Madhu	
2	"Priyathozhi Ninakkay"	Vani Jairam, Rajash	J. Madhu	
3	"Shilayil Chorappookkal"	Vani Jairam	J. Madhu	
4	"Shyaamabhoomiyil"	Rajash	J. Madhu	
