= Aval Appadithan =

1978 film by C. Rudraiah

- Theatrical release poster
- Directed by: C. Rudraiah
- Screenplay by: C. Rudraiah; Somasundareshwar; Vanna Nilavan; Ananthu
- Story by: Ananthu
- Produced by: C. Rudraiah
- Starring: Sripriya; Kamal Haasan; Rajinikanth
- Cinematography: Nallusamy; M. N. Gnanashekaran
- Music by: Ilaiyaraaja
- Production company: Kumar Arts
- Release date: 30 October 1978
- Running time: 114 minutes
- Country: India
- Language: Tamil

Aval Appadithan (transl. That is how she is) is a 1978 Indian Tamil-language drama film directed by C. Rudraiah in his directorial debut, and co-written by him with Somasundareshwar. The film was produced by Rudraiah in association with the M.G.R. Government Film and Television Training Institute. It stars Sripriya, Kamal Haasan and Rajinikanth, while Ilaiyaraaja composed the film's music. The plot revolves around Manju (Sripriya) and the difficulties she faces in her life, due to her romantic relationships, resulting in her developing an aggressive and cynical nature towards men.

Aval Appadithan was released on 30 October 1978, on Diwali day. Although the film received positive critical reception, it was not a box office success at the time of its release. However, the film began to develop an audience after directors Bharathiraja and Mrinal Sen commented positively about it. The film was noted for its stylish filmmaking, screenplay, and dialogue, a large portion of which was in English.

Aval Appadithan was the first film made by a graduate of the M.G.R. Government Film and Television Training Institute. It received the second prize for Best Film at the 1978 Tamil Nadu State Film Awards, while Nallusamy and M. N. Gnanashekharan won the Best Cinematographer award. Additionally, Sripriya received a Special Award for the Best Actress of 1978. In 2013, News18 included the film in its list of, "The 100 greatest Indian films of all time."

== Plot ==
Manju was raised in a dysfunctional family that consisted of a timid father and a philandering mother; she hurtles from one disastrous affair to another, leading to her degenerating into a cynical woman. Into her life enter two radically different men. One of them is her boss, Thyagu, who owns the advertising agency she works for. He is a stereotype of the successful man: money-minded, opinionated, arrogant, and a male chauvinist. In sharp contrast is Arun, who has come to Madras from Coimbatore to make a documentary on women. Sensitive and sincere, he believes his job has a purpose and is both shocked and amused at the cynical attitudes of Manju and Thyagu.

Manju has been drafted by Thyagu to assist Arun in his documentary. As Arun and Manju start working together, Arun begins to understand Manju's complex personality. She tells Arun about her unfortunate past relationships: how she was molested by her uncle, the ending of her first relationship in college when her lover left her by marrying another woman for the sake of employment, and how her second love, Mano, a Christian priest's son, used her to satisfy his needs and lust, calling her "sister" in front of her parents. These incidents have led to her present attitude towards men. Arun later shares these conversations with Thyagu, who warns him to steer clear of such women.

Inevitably, Arun falls for Manju. However, Manju incurs Thyagu's wrath when he overhears her reprimanding her office staff for commenting on her character. When Thyagu also comments about her, she resigns from her job. When he learns of this, Arun requests that Thyagu re-employ her. Thyagu simply laughs and says that she is already back, after which Manju seems to have a change of heart and starts courting Thyagu. Arun is devastated to see that she has turned out to be just the sort of woman that Thyagu earlier said she was — opportunistic, money-minded, and fickle. When he asks her about her contradictory status in life, she responds by saying that is the way she is and will be.

The truth finally emerges that Manju was merely baiting Thyagu to teach him a lesson. When Thyagu starts believing that Manju has fallen for him, he attempts to take advantage of her at a party banquet, but she rebukes and slaps him, after which Thyagu runs away in fright. However, this revelation comes too late for her, as Arun, who is disillusioned with her behaviour, has already married a small town girl. When Manju tells her aunt about the attempt to humiliate Thyagu and its ramifications, her aunt tells Manju that she deserved it for leaving behind a golden opportunity to start a new life. In a final discussion in Thyagu's car, Manju asks Arun's wife, "What do you think of women's liberation?". Arun's wife replies that she does not know. Manju cynically replies that this is why she (the wife) is happy. Manju then voluntarily exits the car and watches it leave with Thyagu and the married couple. A voice-over says that Manju died today, but will be reborn tomorrow, only for the cycle to repeat, and that is how she is.

== Cast ==
- Sripriya as Manju
- Kamal Haasan as Arun
- Rajinikanth as Thyagu
- Sivachandran as Mano
- Chithra as Young Manju
- Kutty Padmini as Herself
- Raveendran as Kiruba
- Sethu Vinayagam as Manju's Father
- Saritha as Arun's wife

== Production ==
=== Development ===
C. Rudraiah was introduced to Kamal Haasan by writer Ananthu. The three shared an interest in the works of Robert Bresson, Jean-Luc Godard, Roman Polanski, and Roberto Rossellini. Godard and Bresson were part of the French New Wave, which focused on films based on social ideas, some of which were iconoclastic in nature. Rudhraiya, Haasan, and Ananthu wanted to experiment with their ideas in Tamil. This was Rudhraiya's first film as director; quite radical in his approach, he wanted to change the conventions of Tamil cinema at that time. Somasundareshwar was writing a script dealing with women's liberation at that time, and it was decided that his script would be used for the film; the result was Aval Appadithan. It was the first film made by a graduate of the M.G.R. Government Film and Television Training Institute. The initial script by Somasundareshwar consisted of two pages.

Aval Appadithan was the debut film for both Nallusamy and M. N. Gnanashekaran, who jointly handled the film's cinematography. Vanna Nilavan co-wrote the screenplay with Somasundareshwar and Rudhraiya. The film was co-produced by Rudhraiya, in association with the students of the M.G.R. Government Film and Television Training Institute. Sripriya, who played Manju, was initially unsure about acting in the film due to her busy schedule at that time, and only agreed to do it on Haasan's insistence. According to Somasundareshwar, the characterisation of Manju was inspired from a woman he met and who had similar radical beliefs. Rajinikanth, who played Thyagu, was convinced by Rudhraiya to join Aval Appadithaan.

=== Filming ===
[Rudraiah] and [Nallusamy] used to discuss the scenes to be shot for [Aval Appadithan] at least two or three days in advance. As for the dialogues, he used to tell me about the scene in detail. He would not be easily satisfied. He would ask for rewriting the lines, if he was not happy with what was written.

— Vanna Nilavan, on the filming of Aval Appadithan.

Throughout the film, the cinematography made extensive use of shadows and close up shots to emphasise the moods of the characters. Jump cuts were frequently used as well. Overall, 8,230 metres of film negative was used to make the film, and the team incurred a cost of ₹ 20,000 (Note: The average exchange rate in 1978 was 10.4315 Indian rupees (₹) per 1 US dollar (US$).) for exterior shooting equipment. The scenes where Arun interviewed women for his documentary were real scenes, improvised with women they would meet at colleges and bus stops, and shot using the live-recording method. The film uses a sharp contrast of black and white colours to lend a surreal atmosphere to it, and none of the actors used make-up.

Filming proceeded smoothly as almost all of the dialogues were ready by the time team went for filming the scenes. The camera angles were pre-planned as well. Haasan shot the film in his spare time, as he was involved in over 20 other films as an actor during the production of Aval Appadithan. Before a shot, Haasan discussed the scene with Ananthu and Rudhraiya on how Godard would have done it. The film was shot in two-hour sessions over a period of four-five months. The opening scene where Haasan looks into the camera and says "Konjam left-la ukaarunga" (Sit a little to the left, please) was meant as a sign to the audience to support gender equality. According to the Tamil newspaper Dinamalar, Aval Appadithan was shot in 20 days.

== Themes and influences ==
Aval Appadithan explores a number of themes such as women's liberation, sex and the chauvinistic attitude of males. Its central theme is on women and their plight in society, as exemplified by Manju and her relationships. Born to a timid father and a mother with loose moral values, she is also subsequently affected by two people she becomes romantically involved with. One, her college mate, left her to marry someone else for the sake of a job; and the second is Mano, the son of a Christian priest, who used her to satisfy his lust and then trivialised their relationship by calling her "sister" in front of her parents. These relationships result in her becoming wary of men and developing an aggressive nature towards them. Conversations related to matters like the status of women in contemporary (1978) times and the nature of humankind are frequently seen in the film.

Feminist writer C. S. Lakshmi wrote in her essay "A Good Woman, A Very Good Woman", that Manju's characterisation was "brought out entirely verbally by her". Lakshmi believes the film to be constantly resorting to "existing myths about women and relationships: that a wayward mother destroys her children; that a woman who speaks the 'truth' is always alone; that men are scared of her; that the woman who is different is confused, not sure of herself and is only seeking love from a man but does not know it herself." She further asserts that the film's only positive aspect is "it does not expose the body of women in the way it is customary" and that Manju could have avoided her unfortunate set of circumstances "if only she had a 'proper' mother".

Artist Jeeva compared Aval Appadithan to other films whose central theme was women, such as Charulata (1964), Aval Oru Thodar Kathai (1974), and Panchagni (1986), while also labelling them as "classics that put the spotlight on women." Ashish Rajadhyaksha and Paul Willemen, in their book Encyclopedia of Indian Cinema, say the film was also inspired by the 1972 film, Dhakam. They also note that Aval Appadithan uses a "fluid narrative style" and music to mix flashbacks with vox-pop and "glossy pictorialism". The film is an exception on stereotypes of women, as shown by paralleling an independent woman, Manju, and a pious traditional woman: Manju gets into problems while Arun's wife is happy. The last lines of the film where Manju asks "what do you think of 'women's liberation'", Arun's wife answers, "I don't know", to which Manju says "that is why you are happy", send the message that one will inevitably get into trouble if one exhibits assertive behaviour.

Kamal Haasan's character, Arun, is an early version of a metrosexual male — sensitive and sincere. Rajinikanth's character, Thyagu, is the exact opposite of Arun — money-minded, arrogant, and a womaniser. This is evident when Thyagu says to Arun: "Women should be enjoyed, not analysed." According to Rajinikanth, Thyagu was very much similar to him in real life — he too smokes and drinks. According to film critic Naman Ramachandran, Thyagu was, by far, Rajinikanth's most entertaining character up to that point in his career; his character was a self-confessed chauvinist who believed that men and women can never be equal, and that women are merely objects to be used for men's pleasure. When Arun calls Thyagu "a prejudiced ass", Thyagu responds by saying, "I am a male ass," with the dialogue being in English. His opinion of Sripriya's character, Manju, is seen when he says (also in English), "She is a self pitying sex-starved bitch!"

== Music ==
Aval Appadithan's soundtrack and score were composed by Ilaiyaraaja. The album featured three songs: "Uravugal Thodarkathai", "Panneer Pushpangale" and "Vaazhkai Odam"; the lyrics were written by Gangai Amaran and Kannadasan and the vocals for the songs were performed by K. J. Yesudas, Haasan and S. Janaki, respectively. The soundtrack was released under the label of EMI Records.

== Release and reception ==
Aval Appadithan was released on 30 October 1978, on Diwali day. It was released in only two theatres in Madras: Kamadhenu, and either Emerald or Blue Diamond in the Safire Theatre complex. The film did not initially receive a big response from the public, and was not a box office success upon its release. However, after the directors Bharathiraja and Mrinal Sen wrote positive comments on it, the latter remarking, "The film was far ahead of its times", people began to watch the film and appreciate it, leading Aval Appadithan to develop a cult following. In November 2014, Haasan defended the financial failure of the film, "Aval Appadithan was a guerilla attack on the industry by insiders like me. It slipped through their fingers, so to speak. With all the attention that films get these days, I doubt we can get away with such a film any more."

The film received generally positive reviews from critics. Critics appreciated the live-recording method of shooting the sequences where Haasan's character, Arun, interviews women for his documentary. On 19 November 1978, the magazine Ananda Vikatan criticised the gaps in the film, particularly the abundance of English dialogue, the excessive focus on naturalism, and lower standard of technical work (especially the cinematography). Despite these perceived flaws, the magazine still appreciated the film, stating that the actors immersed themselves into their characters, leading to them not really acting before the camera but living the characters.

== Accolades ==
The film was awarded the Second Prize for Best Film at the 1978 Tamil Nadu State Film Awards. At the same ceremony, Nallusamy and M. N. Gnanashekharan won the award for Best Cinematographer, and Sripriya received a Special Award for Best Actress of the year.

== Legacy ==
The world will remember him for [Aval Appadithan], a film that shook the foundations of the Tamil film industry and still does. College students still watch it and generations are scratching their heads over how we managed to bring it out. I will remember him for his passion for cinema. He was one of those directors who wouldn’t mind holding a reflector aloft, if it meant that a scene would look better.

— Kamal Haasan on Rudhraiya, in November 2014.

Aval Appadithan is one of only two films ever directed by Rudhraiya; the other was Gramathu Athiyayam (1980). Aval Appadithan was noted for its stylish filmmaking, screenplay and dialogue, a large portion of it being in English. The dialogues were sharp and were considered almost vulgar. It also broke the style of filmmaking followed up until that time. Sripriya included it in her list of favourite films she had worked in. Rudhraiya's daughter, Ganga, noted that Aval Appadithan help her face life in the real world.

In May 2007, K. Balamurugan of Rediff included Aval Appadithan in his list of "Rajni's Tamil Top 10", saying, "It was what we would call parallel cinema these days.". In July 2007, S. R. Ashok Kumar of The Hindu asked eight Tamil film directors to list their all-time favourite Tamil films; two of them – Balu Mahendra and Ameer – named Aval Appadithan. D. Karthikeyan of The Hindu wrote in December 2009 that Aval Appadithan would "remain etched in every film lover's memory by showing the best of Rajnikanth's acting skills." S. Shiva Kumar of The Hindu included the film on his December 2010 list of "Electrifying Rajinikanth-Kamal Haasan films" with Moondru Mudichu (1976), Avargal (1977) and 16 Vayathinile (1977). Thiagarajan Kumararaja named Aval Appadithan as an inspiration for his film Aaranya Kaandam (2011). In April 2013, News18 included the film in its list, "The 100 greatest Indian films of all time". As of July 2013, Sruti Harihara Subramanian, founder and trustee of The Cinema Resource Centre (TCRC), has preserved many promotional stills and photographs of the film's production.

In November 2013, The New Indian Express included the film in its list, "Kamal Haasan's most underrated films". Writing for The Hindu in 2014, Baradwaj Rangan commented and remarked on how "different" the film was by saying: "Aval Appadithan was different. The shadowy black-and-white cinematography was different. The dialogues, which were more about revealing character than advancing plot, were different. The frank handling of sex and profanity ('she is a self-pitying, sex-starved bitch!') was different. The documentary-like detours were different. The painfully sensitive, feminist hero was different. Rudraiah was different." In Kathai Thiraikathai Vasanam Iyakkam (2014), the hero's writing team discusses the theme of Aval Appadithan to get ideas for their film's story, until they realise that the film was a failure at the time of its release. Indo-Asian News Service, in their review of Sripriya's directorial venture Malini 22 Palayamkottai (2014), a film about a rape victim, stated, "Sripriya, who was once a successful actress, played a rape victim in Tamil drama Aval Appadithan. It's probably because of that role and the effect it had left on her, she handles this subject with great care and understanding that most of her peers would lack." In January 2015, Somasundareshwar said, "I was told that if Aval Appadithan were made today, it would be a blockbuster. I don’t agree, for it’s still taboo for a woman to talk about her sexual encounters. The profile of the audience should change." In July 2016, The Hindu included Aval Appadithan in its list of "roles that defined Rajinikanth the actor".

== Bibliography ==
- Dhananjayan, G. (2011). The Best of Tamil Cinema, 1931 to 2010: 1977–2010. Galatta Media. ISBN 978-81-921043-0-0.
- Rajadhyaksha, Ashish; Willemen, Paul (1998) [1994]. Encyclopaedia of Indian Cinema. Oxford University Press. ISBN 0-19-563579-5.
- Ramachandran, Naman (2014) [2012]. Rajinikanth: The Definitive Biography (2nd ed.). Penguin Books Limited. ISBN 978-81-8475-796-5.
- Velayutham, Selvaraj (2008). Tamil Cinema: The Cultural Politics of India's Other Film Industry. Routledge. ISBN 978-0-415-39680-6.
