= M. K. Ashok =

Indian politician

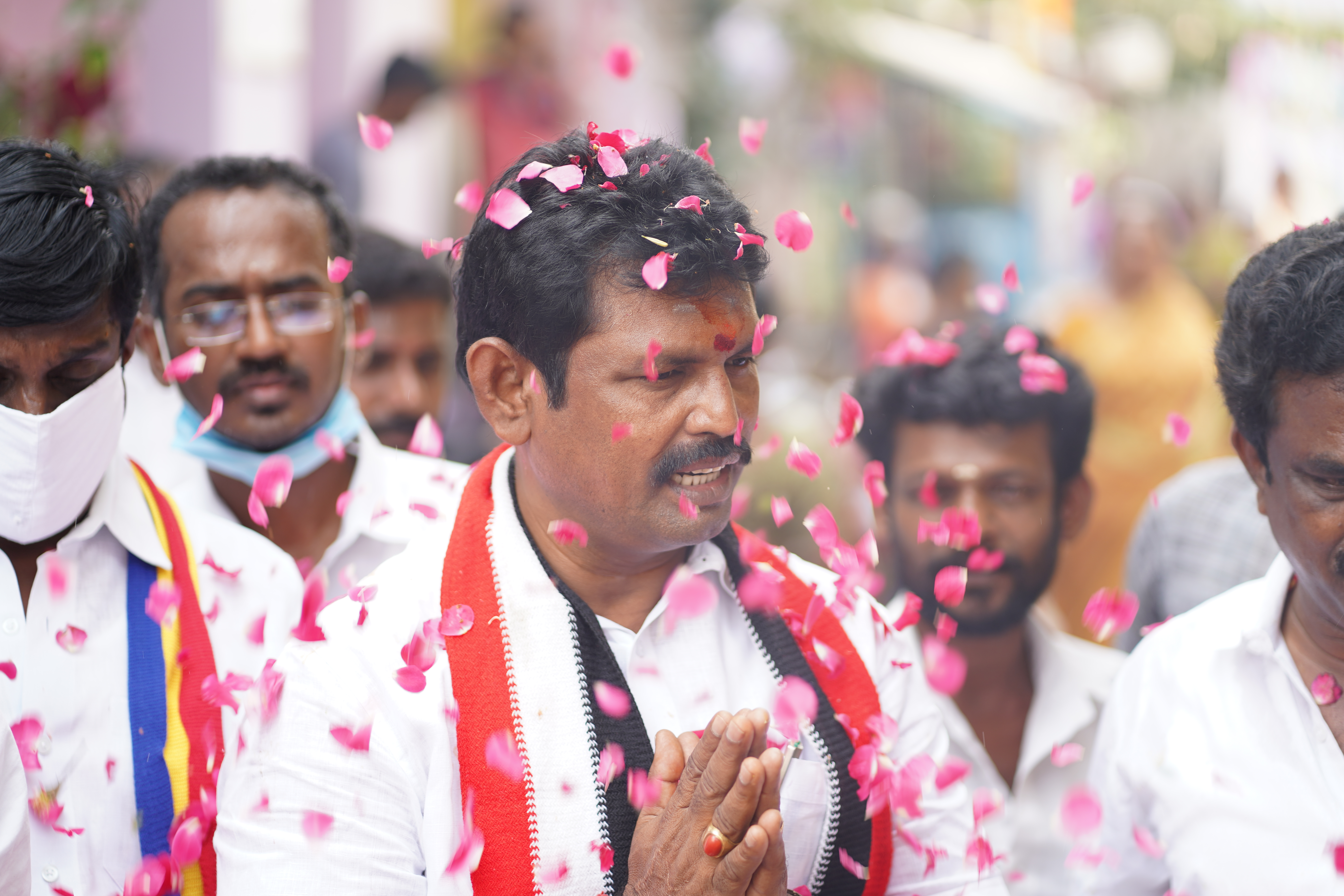
- M.K. Ashok in 2021

Member of the Tamil Nadu Legislative Assembly
- In office 23 May 2011 – 21 May 2016
- Constituency: Velachery

Personal details
- Party: All India Anna Dravida Munnetra Kazhagam

M. K. Ashok is an Indian politician and was a member of the 14th Tamil Nadu Legislative Assembly from the Velachery constituency in Chennai District. He represented the All India Anna Dravida Munnetra Kazhagam party.

The elections of 2016 resulted in his constituency being won by Vagai Chanderasekar. Ashok was one of thirteen AIADMK MLAs in the Greater Chennai area who were deselected by the party, apparently in an attempt to thwart a potential anti-incumbency backlash from the electorate following the recent flooding. It was felt that fresh faces would put some distance between the past and the present.

On 22 June 2015, Ashok, his wife and a relative were injured in a car accident at the village of Pudusukkampatti, near Melur, Madurai. The three, along with a driver who escaped uninjured, were on their way to attend a funeral in Paramakudi when the accident occurred.

== Electoral performance ==
2021 Tamil Nadu Legislative Assembly election: Velachery
Party	Candidate	Votes	%	±%
INC	J. M. H. Aassan Maulaana	68,493	39.15	New
AIADMK	M. K. Ashok	64,141	36.66	+1.75
MNM	Santhosh Babu	23,072	13.19	New
NTK	M. Keerthana	14,171	8.10	+5.81
AMMK	M. Chandrabose	1,977	1.13	New
NOTA	NOTA	1,742	1.00	−1.41
Margin of victory		4,352	2.49	−2.57
Turnout		174,972	55.63	−2.71
Rejected ballots		70	0.04	
Registered electors		314,537		
INC gain from DMK		Swing	-0.82	

2011 Tamil Nadu Legislative Assembly election: Velachery
Party	Candidate	Votes	%	±%
AIADMK	M. K. Ashok	82,145	53.91	New
PMK	M. Jayaraman	50,425	33.10	New
Independent	E. Sarathbabu	7,472	4.90	New
BJP	Dr. Tamilisai Soundararajan	7,048	4.63	New
Loktantrik Samajwadi Party	Senthil Kumar Arumugam	1,225	0.80	New
IJK	K. N. Seshadri	1,036	0.68	New
Margin of victory		31,720	20.82	
Turnout		152,364	67.05	
Registered electors		227,249		
AIADMK win (new seat)				
