= Chinnavar =

- Poster
- Directed by: Gangai Amaran
- Written by: Gangai Amaran
- Produced by: C. H. Venu
- Starring: Prabhu; Chandrasekhar; Kasthuri
- Cinematography: A. Sabapathy
- Edited by: V. T. Vijayan; B. Lenin
- Music by: Ilaiyaraaja
- Production company: Indrani Movies
- Release date: 24 April 1992
- Running time: 135 minutes
- Country: India
- Language: Tamil

Chinnavar is a 1992 Indian Tamil-language film written and directed by Gangai Amaran. The film stars Prabhu, Chandrasekhar and Kasthuri. It was released on 24 April 1992.

== Plot ==
Muthu and Veerasamy are fishermen and they fish together in the same boat. Muthu lives with his mother. Veerasamy loves to drink a lot of alcohol and he has a sister, Meena who is in love with Muthu. Muthu decides to marry his carefree friend Veerasamy to Ponni. In a financial trouble, Veerasamy joins Kumar's boat, Kumar is a rich fishermen union leader. Veerasamy realises that Meena is in love with Muthu and he promises Muthu his sister's hand. Meanwhile, Kumar asks Veerasamy to marry Meena, and compelled by his wife, Veerasamy accepts. Hopeless, Meena tied to herself a Thaali, says to Veerasamy that Muthu marries her and Muthu confirms to save her honour. Veerasamy gets angry but when Muthu says the truth, he apologises to him. Kumar beats Muthu's mother and kidnaps Meena, he arranges a forced marriage between him and Meena. Muthu saves her and he finally marries her with his best friend's blessing.

== Cast ==
- Prabhu as Muthu alias Chinnavar
- Chandrasekhar as Veerasamy
- Kasthuri as Meena
- Chithra as Ponni
- Radha Ravi as Kumar
- Goundamani
- Senthil
- Kovai Sarala as Sevattamma
- S. N. Lakshmi as Muthu's mother
- Disco Shanti as item number

== Soundtrack ==
The soundtrack was composed by Ilaiyaraaja, with lyrics written by the director himself, Gangai Amaran. The song "Andhiyile Vaanam" is set in Pahadi raga. It became popular and was featured in the Tamil film Super Deluxe (2019).

Song	Singer(s)	Duration
"Andhiyile Vaanam"	Swarnalatha, Mano	5:01
"Goondru Gongura"	Mano, K. S. Chithra	5:06
"Kadalorak Kavithayileu"	Chorus	4:56
"Kottukkali"	S. P. Balasubrahmanyam, K. S. Chithra	5:11
"Maaraappu Chela"	Mano, K. S. Chithra	4:59
"Padakottum Pattammah"	K. S. Chithra, Malaysia Vasudevan	5:10
"Uttalangkiri Kiri"	Malaysia Vasudevan, K. S. Chithra	4:59

== Critical reception ==
The Indian Express wrote, "Storytelling takes the back seat, and charming cinematography and other fancy works rule the roast in Chinnavar".
