= J. M. H. Aassan Maulaana =

Indian politician

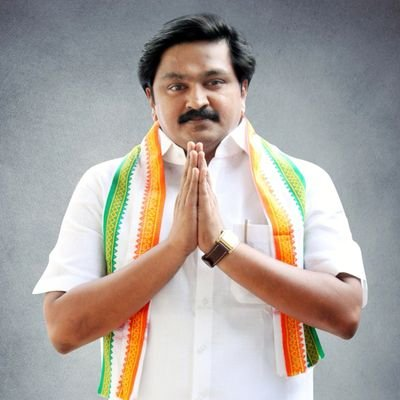

Member of the Tamil Nadu Legislative Assembly
- In office 12 May 2021 – 6 May 2026
- Preceded by: Vagai Chandrasekhar
- Constituency: Velachery

Personal details
- Born: 8 October 1983 (age 42) Chennai
- Party: Indian National Congress
- Spouse: Shajitha Hassan
- Parent: J. M. Haroon Rashid (father)
- Education: M.B.A., L.L.B.
- Profession: Lawyer

J. M. H. Aassan Maulaana (born 8 October 1983) is an Indian politician and Member of Legislative Assembly of Tamil Nadu. He was elected to the Tamil Nadu Legislative Assembly from Velachery constituency as an Indian National Congress candidate during the 2021 Tamil Nadu Legislative Assembly election. He is the son of J. M. Haroon Rashid, former Member of Parliament, who represented Theni Lok Sabha constituency.

== Electoral performance ==
Election	Constituency	Political party	Result	Vote %	Opposition			Ref
Election	Constituency	Political party	Result	Vote %	Candidate	Political party	Vote %	Ref
2016	Ambattur	INC	Lost	33.48%	V. Alexander	AIADMK	41.10%	
2021	Velachery	INC	Won	39.15%	M. K. Ashok	AIADMK	36.66%	-
