= Veliyattam =

- Directed by: P. T. Rajan
- Written by: A. R. Jose; P. K. Sarangapani (dialogues)
- Screenplay by: P. K. Sarangapani
- Produced by: Thomas Mathew
- Starring: Menaka; M. G. Soman; Nisha Noor; Ravikumar
- Cinematography: N. A. Thara
- Edited by: G. Venkittaraman
- Music by: M. K. Arjunan
- Production company: Divya Productions
- Distributed by: Divya Productions
- Release date: 5 June 1981
- Country: India
- Language: Malayalam

Veliyattam is a 1981 Indian Malayalam film, directed by P. T. Rajan and produced by Thomas Mathew. The film stars Menaka, M. G. Soman, Nisha Chowdhary and Ravikumar in the lead roles. The film has musical score by M. K. Arjunan.

== Cast ==
- Menaka as Jaanu
- M. G. Soman as Vishwam
- Nisha Noor as Vasanthi
- Ravikumar as Ravi
- Santhakumari as Lakshmiyamma
- Oduvil Unnikrishnan as Mani
- P. K. Abraham as Kurup
- Poojappura Ravi as Paramu
- Bobby Kottarakkara as Appu
- C. I. Paul as Damu
- Alummoodan as Foreign Thankachan
- Adoor Bhavani as Mariya
- Paravoor Bharathan as Menon
- Remadevi as Pulluvathi
- Sairabhanu as Sathyabhama

== Soundtrack ==
The music was composed by M. K. Arjunan and the lyrics were written by Poovachal Khader and Alappuzha Rajasekharan Nair.

No.	Song	Singers	Lyrics	Length (m:ss)
1	"Kalyaana Melangal"	K. J. Yesudas, S. Janaki	Poovachal Khader, Alappuzha Rajasekharan Nair	
2	"Karangal Korthu Pidikkuka Naam	Vani Jairam	Poovachal Khader, Alappuzha Rajasekharan Nair	
3	"Kilukile Kilukile"	K. J. Yesudas	Poovachal Khader, Alappuzha Rajasekharan Nair	
4	"Maanikyakkallulla"	K. J. Yesudas	Poovachal Khader, Alappuzha Rajasekharan Nair	
