= Inimai Idho Idho =

- Title card
- Directed by: R. Ramalingam
- Produced by: Latha Narayanan
- Starring: Chandrasekhar; Nisha Noor; Rajendra Prasad
- Cinematography: Ashok Gunjal
- Edited by: M. Vellaisamy
- Music by: Ilaiyaraaja
- Production company: Geethalaya Arts Films
- Release date: 29 April 1983
- Country: India
- Language: Tamil

Inimai Idho Idho (transl. Happiness is here) is a 1983 Indian Tamil-language comedy drama film directed by R. Ramalingam in his debut, starring Chandrasekhar, Nisha Noor, and Rajendra Prasad. It was released on 29 April 1983.

== Plot ==
Kuppusamy is a small-time rough thug who wanders in the village cheating other villagers. With a little boy, he helps Kuppusamy to create a manipulative story and gain their sympathy and cheat them of their money. Both finally share the money partially. Kuppusamy is a money oriented, furious, angry guy but good at heart. Kannamma is an orphan girl, who is very mischievous, and carefree, who also lives with her friend in the same village. Panchayat head tries to misbehave with her but she refuses to be his concubine so panchayat head frames Kannamma as a bad girl among the villagers and this leads her to staying away from the village. Without any fear she agrees to move, but her friend's brother (the little boy who is the partner of Kuppusamy in the cheating business) makes her stay with Kuppasamy as a servant without the knowledge of villagers. Though Kuppasamy has plenty of money, he never shows off and is very particular about spending it. Somehow Kuppusamy agreeds to Kannamma as a servant but he never allows her inside his house. In order to gain his trust Kannamma tries her best to impress him by cleaning the house and cooking but he never sees this but scolds her instead, but Kannamma needs safety and security so she looking for a life partner. She develops a soft spot for Kuppusamy. Rajendra Prasad comes to that village and proposes to Kannamma, but Kannamma says that Kuppusamy is her mother and he will kill him. However, Prasad is very particular to marry her. She gets torn between two guys. The guy she loves and the guy who loves her. Who she marries form the climax.

== Cast ==
- Chandrasekhar as Kuppusamy
- Nisha Noor as Kannamma
- Rajendra Prasad
- Goundamani as Panchayat head

== Production ==
Inimai Idho Idho marked the directorial debut of Ramalingam who earlier assisted A. C. Tirulokchandar. He initially wanted to name the film as Vaanam Paartha Bhoomi (transl. The Earth that saw the sky); since many considered it as anti-sentimental, he named it Inimai Idho Idho and admitted the title did not suit the plot. The film was launched on 18 November 1982 at Prasad Studios. Viswam Natraj was originally chosen as cinematographer; however he was replaced by Ashok Gunjal.

== Soundtrack ==
The music was composed by Ilaiyaraaja.

Track listing
No.	Title	Lyrics	Singer(s)	Length
1.	"Aathoram Koovuthu"	Gangai Amaran	Malaysia Vasudevan, Gangai Amaran	4:05
2.	"Alli Vacha Malligaye"	Vairamuthu	Krishnachander, P. Susheela	4:03
3.	"Vanji Kodi"	Vairamuthu	S. Janaki	4:36
4.	"Kizhakke Vara"	Gangai Amaran	Malaysia Vasudevan	4:32
Total length:				17:16

== Critical reception ==
Jayamanmadhan of Kalki said the film was proof that the director had a bright future ahead, and wished him the best.
