= Pannaipuram =

- Town
- Location in Tamil Nadu, India
- Coordinates: 9°51′43″N 77°16′19″E
- Country: India
- State: Tamil Nadu
- District: Theni

Population (2011)
  - Total: 9,323

Languages
  - Official: Tamil
- Time zone: UTC+5:30 (IST)
- PIN: 625 524
- Vehicle registration: TN 60

Pannaipuram is a panchayat town in Theni district in the Indian state of Tamil Nadu. It is in Uthamapalayam Talak, Theni District.

== Demographics ==
As of 2011 India census, Pannaipuram had a population of 9323. Males constitute 49.6% of the population and females 50.4%. Pannaipuram has an average literacy rate of 74.93%, higher than the national average of 59.5%: male literacy is 82.58%, and female literacy is 67.42%. In Pannaipuram, 8.34% of the population is under 6 years of age.

== Notable people ==
- Ilaiyaraaja, composer
- Gangai Amaran film director, Ilaiyaraaja's brother
- Yuvan Shankar Raja, composer, Ilaiyaraaja's son
- Karthik Raja, composer Ilaiyaraaja's son
- Bhavatharini, singer, Ilaiyaraaja's daughter

== Neutrino project ==
Pannaipuram is 5 kilometres south of the proposed Indian Neutrino observatory site in the Bodi West Hills.
