= Loktantrik Samajwadi Party =

Loktantrik Samajwadi Party may refer to:

- Loktantrik Samajwadi Party, Nepal
- Loktantrik Samajwadi Party (India)
