= Uchi Veyil =

- Directed by: Jayabharathi
- Screenplay by: Ravindran Ramamurthy
- Story by: Indira Parthasarathy
- Produced by: T. M. Sundaram
- Starring: Kuppuswamy
- Cinematography: Ramesh Vyas
- Edited by: Balu Shankar
- Music by: L. Vaidyanathan
- Production company: Jwala Film
- Release date: 4 November 1990
- Running time: 100−105 minutes (Note: While Encyclopaedia of Indian Cinema gives the runtime as 100 minutes, the version reviewed by Variety is 105 minutes.)
- Country: India
- Language: Tamil

Uchi Veyil (transl. High Noon) is a 1990 Indian Tamil-language drama film directed by Jayabharathi.

== Cast ==
- Kuppuswamy as Duraiswamy
- Vijay as Shankar
- Srividya
- Delhi Ganesh as Sabhapathy

== Production ==
Shot in 13 days, Uchi Veyil was directed by Jayabharathi, the screenplay was written by Ravindran Ramamurthy based on a story by Indira Parthasarathy, and produced by T. M. Sundaram under Jwala Film on a shoestring budget of ₹4.8 lakh (worth ₹1.2 crore in 2021 prices) within 8 days. Debutant Kuppuswamy who was 75 years old at that time and was struggling for so many years to become an actor in films was chosen as lead actor of the film. Cinematography was handled by Ramesh Vyas, and editing by Balu Shankar. The score was composed by L. Vaidyanathan. The film had no songs or star actors.

== Release and reception ==
The film was screened at the International Film Festival of India at Calcutta, and the Toronto International Film Festival, both in 1990. It was positively received by critics, particularly David Overby and Suze of Variety.

== Bibliography ==
- Baskaran, S. Theodore (1996). The Eye of the Serpent: An Introduction to Tamil Cinema. Chennai: East West Books.
- Rajadhyaksha, Ashish; Willemen, Paul (1998) [1994]. Encyclopaedia of Indian Cinema. British Film Institute and Oxford University Press. ISBN 0-19-563579-5.
