= Kudisai =

- Poster
- Directed by: Jayabharathi
- Written by: D. Ramamoorthy
- Based on: Kudisai by D. Ramamoorthy
- Starring: Dhandapani; Kamala Kamesh; Raji; Delhi Ganesh; Chellappa; Kala Krishnan
- Cinematography: Robert–Rajasekar
- Edited by: D. Raj
- Music by: G. Kamesh
- Production company: Juvaala
- Release date: 30 March 1979
- Country: India
- Language: Tamil

Kudisai (transl. The Hut) is a 1979 Indian Tamil-language film directed by Jayabharathi. It is the first Tamil film made through crowdfunding. The film, based on the novel of the same name written by Jayabharathi's father D. Ramamoorthy, was released on 30 March 1979.

== Cast ==
- Dhandapani as the family head
- Kamala Kamesh as Chinnamma
- Raji as Aandal
- Delhi Ganesh as Parthasarathy
- Chellappa as the elder brother
- Kala Krishnan as the washerwoman

== Production ==
Kudisai marked the directorial debut of Jayabharathi. It is based on the novel of the same name written by Jayabharathi's father Ramamoorthy for the magazine Kanayazhi. Jayabharathi undertook a crowdfunding route to raise ₹90,000 (equivalent to ₹2.3 million or US$24,000 in 2023) to distribute the film for screening, and to generate investment, he sold donation tickets and conducted programmes at government colleges while Rajasekhar, a friend of Jayabharathi, helped him arrange a camera on loan. Singer Ceylon Manohar also helped by conducting shows and a farmer in Padi Kuppam provided him with food during the shooting. This was the debut film of Robert–Rajasekar as cinematographers. The film starred newcomer Dhandapani in the lead role.

== Soundtrack ==
Unlike many contemporaneous Indian films, Kudisai had no songs, and the background music was composed by G. Kamesh, Kamala's husband.

== Release ==
Kudisai was released on 30 March 1979. As of March 2022, it is preserved at the National Film Archive of India.

== Critical reception ==
Anna lauded the film for its innovativeness, and absence of Tamil cinema cliches like glossy makeup, songs and dance sequences.

== See also ==
- List of Indian films without songs
