= Vagai Chandrasekhar =

Tamil actor

Chandrasekhar
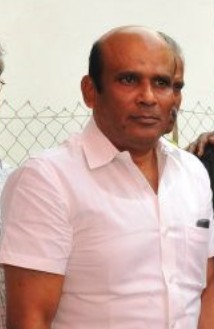

Member of the Tamil Nadu Legislative Assembly
- In office 20 May 2016 – 2 May 2021
- Preceded by: M. K. Ashok
- Succeeded by: J M H Hassan
- Constituency: Velachery

Chairman of Tamil Nadu Eyal Isai Naataka Mandram
- Incumbent
- Assumed office August 2021 - October 2026

Personal details
- Born: 16 May 1956 (age 70) Vagaikulam, Madurai, Tamil Nadu
- Spouse(s): Jagadeeshwari (m.1987-present)
- Children: Sivaharshan; Sivanandhini (Twins)
- Occupation: Actor; Politician
- Awards: National Film Award for Best Supporting Actor; 2002 Nanba Nanba

Chandrasekhar (born 3 May 1956), also known as Vagai Chandrasekhar, is an Indian actor and politician working in Tamil language films, known for his histrionics. He is currently the Chairman of Tamil Nadu Eyal Isai Nataka Mandram. He played lead or supportive roles in Tamil films of the 1980s. He won the National Film Award for Best Supporting Actor for his role in the 2002 film Nanba Nanba. He contested and won from Velachery constituency in the 2016 Tamil Nadu legislative assembly election from Dravida Munnetra Kazhagam (DMK) party.

== Filmography ==
=== Actor ===
==== Films ====
- Puthiya Vaarpugal (1979)
- Suvarilladha Chiththirangal (1979)
- Niram Maratha Pookal (1979)
- Oru Thalai Ragam (1980)
- Nizhalgal (1980)
- Kallukkul Eeram (1980)
- Palaivana Solai (1981)
- Pattam Parakattum (1981)
- Panchami (1981)
- Sivappu Malli (1981)
- Sumai (1981)
- Rajangam (1981)
- Azhagiya Kanne (1982)
- Antha Rathirikku Satchi Illai (1982)
- Thooku Medai (1982)
- Thaai Mookaambikai (1982)
- Echchil Iravugal (1982)
- Marumagale Vaazhga (1982)
- Inimai Idho Idho (1983)
- Ingeyum Oru Gangai (1984)
- Theerppu En Kaiyil (1984)
- Puyal Kadantha Bhoomi (1984)
- Pudhiya Sangamam (1984)
- Oomai Janangal (1984)
- Naagam (1985)
- Raja Gopuram (1985)
- Mannukketha Ponnu (1985)
- Aval Sumangalithan (1985)
- Needhiyin Nizhal (1985)
- Sivappu Kili (1985)
- Selvakku (1986)
- Maragatha Veenai (1986)
- Dharma Pathini (1986)
- Mahasakthi Mariamman (1986)
- Solai Pushpangal (1986)
- Muthal Vasantham (1986)
- Ragasiyam (1986)
- Mattukkara Mannaru (1986)
- Adutha Veedu (1986)
- Choru (1986)
- Samsaram Adhu Minsaram (1986)
- Oomai Vizhigal (1986)
- Sigappu Malargal (1986)
- Ninaikka Therintha Maname (1987)
- Koottu Puzhukkal (1987)
- Nilavai Kaiyil Pudichaen (1987)
- Ini Oru Sudhanthiram (1987)
- Ullam Kavarntha Kalvan (1987)
- Thangachi (1987)
- Neram Nallarukku (1987)
- Shenbagame Shenbagame (1988)
- Ganam Courtar Avargale (1988)
- Vacha Kuri Thappathu (1988)
- Illam (1988)
- Raththa Dhanam (1988)
- Rendum Rendum Anju (1988)
- Sakkarai Pandhal (1988)
- Thappu Kanakku (1988)
- Pattikattu Thambi (1988)
- Paarthal Pasu (1988)
- Palaivanathil Pattampoochi (1988)
- Senthoora Poove (1988)
- Paadatha Theneekkal (1988)
- Paasa Mazhai (1989)
- Karagattakaran (1989)
- Thiruppu Munai (1989)
- Sakalakala Sammanthi (1989)
- Murugane Thunai (1990)
- Thai Maasam Poovaasam (1990)
- Silambu (1990)
- Aalay Pathu Malai Mathu (1990)
- Pengal Veettin Kangal (1990)
- Durga (1990)
- Sathan Sollai Thattathe (1990)
- Pudhu Padagan (1990)
- Kizhakku Karai (1991)
- Mangalyam Thanthunane (1991)
- Mill Thozhilali (1991)
- Purushan Enakku Arasan (1992)
- Naane Varuven (1992)
- Bharathan (1992)
- Chinnavar (1992)
- Kottai Vaasal (1992)
- Endrum Anbudan (1992)
- Kasu Thangakasu (1992)
- Kaviya Thalaivan (1992)
- Villu Pattukaran (1992)
- Maravan (1993)
- Madurai Meenatshi (1993)
- Maharasan (1993)
- Thanga Pappa (1993)
- Pathini Penn (1993)
- Rajadhi Raja Raja Kulothunga Raja Marthanda Raja Gambeera Kathavaraya Krishna Kamarajan (1993)
- En Idhaya Rani (1993)
- Ilaignar Ani (1994)
- Jai Hind (1994)
- Rasa Magan (1994)
- Maindhan (1994)
- Pudhusa Pootha Rosa (1994)
- Senthamizh Selvan (1994)
- Seevalaperi Pandi (1994)
- Seeman (1994)
- Chinna Muthu (1994)
- Anbu Magan (1995)
- Muthu Kaalai (1995)
- Periya Kudumbam (1995)
- Pullakuttikaran (1995)
- Anthimanthaarai (1996)
- Panchalankurichi (1996)
- Thirumbi Paar (1996)
- Poovarasan (1996)
- Puthiya Parasakthi (1996)
- Vaazhga Jananayagam (1996)
- Periya Thambi (1997)
- Abhimanyu (1997)
- Thayin Manikodi (1998)
- Thirupathi Ezhumalai Venkatesa (1999)
- Veeranadai (2000)
- Pandavar Bhoomi (2001)
- Kasi (2001)
- Kaatrukkenna Veli (2001)
- Citizen (2001)
- Kamarasu (2002)
- Ezhumalai (2002)
- Devan (2002)
- Namma Veetu Kalyanam (2002)
- Nanba Nanba (2002)
- Sena (2003)
- Don Chera (2006)
- Perarasu (2006)
- Mann (2006)
- Periyar (2007)
- Thotta (2008)
- Goa (2010)
- Maanja Velu (2010)
- Poovampatty (2012)
- Angusam (2014)
- Maanaadu (2021)
- Selfie (2022)
- Japan (2023)
- Soodhu Kavvum 2 (2024) as Kannabiran
- Shakthi Thirumagan (2025)
- Desiya Thalaivar (2025)
- Makkal Kaavalan (2026)

==== Television ====
- Appa (Sun TV)
- Veppilaikkari (Sun TV)
- Thekkathi Ponnu (Kalaignar TV)
- Vasantham (Sun TV)

=== Dubbing artist ===
| Actor | Film | Notes |
|---|---|---|
| Vijayan | Chinna Thambi Periya Thambi, Ramana | |
| Ajay Rathnam | Gunaa | |
| Annu Kapoor | Siraichaalai | Dubbed version of Malayalam film Kalapani |
| Mammootty | Narasimha Naicker | Dubbed version of Malayalam film Dhruvam |
