= C. Rudraiah =

Indian film director (1947–2014)

Rudraiah
- Born: Rudraiah Chockalingam; 25 July 1947; Attur, Salem district, Madras Province, British India (now Tamil Nadu, India)
- Died: 18 November 2014 (aged 67); Chennai, Tamil Nadu, India
- Other name: Arumugam (Arukutty)
- Occupations: Director, producer
- Years active: 1978–1980
- Father: Chockalingam

Rudraiah Chockalingam (c. 25 July 1947 – 18 November 2014) was an Indian film director most known for directing the film, Aval Appadithan (1978) which starred Kamal Haasan, Rajinikanth and Sripriya.

== Early life ==
He was born the son of Chockalingam on 25 July 1947 in Attur, a town in Salem district, present-day Tamil Nadu.

== Career ==
He graduated with a bachelor's degree in economics from St. Joseph's College, Tiruchirapalli and went on to pursue a diploma in film direction from Film and Television Institute of Tamil Nadu, Chennai. His directorial debut Aval Appadithan 'made an impact at the time of its release because its story and dialogues were different from many other Tamil films. The photography throughout the film emphasises moods by using shadows, and close-up shots are used extensively. Jump cuts are also common throughout the film. Aval Appadithan is considered as a milestone in Tamil film history. Indian filmmaker Mrinal Sen remarked that the film "was far ahead of the times". Rudraiah's second film, Gramathu Athiyayam (1980) was a rural tale set in a rustic Tamil village. In 1978, he began a project Yaaro Paarkirargal, based on a novel by Sujatha featuring Kamal Haasan, Seema and Saritha despite a song being recorded, it was shelved.

Despite the success of his first film, Rudraiah found it difficult to continue making films as a result of the changing style of the film industry and the audience's preference for star-driven projects. In 1982, he began a venture titled Raja Ennai Mannithuvidu featuring Kamal Haasan, Chandrahasan, Sujatha and Sumalatha, which dealt with conflicts between two brothers. The film was shot simultaneously in Telugu and was 40% complete, when Kamal Haasan pulled out citing he wanted to work on scripts with more star value, and the film eventually was thereafter shelved. The songs recorded for the film by Ilaiyaraaja were later used in other ventures.

Rudraiah then announced another film titled Unmayai Thedi which also failed to materialise, before he began work on the road movie, TXT7 in 1988. Written by Sujatha, the team signed on Raghuvaran to play the lead role of a taxi driver and L. Vaidyanathan to compose music. However financial problems meant that the film was soon after indefinitely postponed. The failure for his own productions to take off meant that by 1990, Rudraiah was open to directing films for other producers and began work on a tragic love story titled Kadalpurathil featuring Archana. Soon after production began, the makers decided to change the lead actress and create it as a television film instead, and it was later premièred on Doordarshan.

== Death ==
Rudraiah died in Chennai on 18 November 2014 at the age of 67 after an illness.

== Filmography ==
- Aval Appadithan (1978)
- Gramathu Athiyayam (1980)
