= Gangai Amaran =

Indian film director and composer (born 1947)

- Born: 8 December 1947 (age 78); Pannaipuram, Theni, Tamil Nadu
- Occupations: Film director, Screenwriter, Composer, Lyricist, Playback singer, Actor, Conductor, Instrumentalist, Voice actor
- Years active: 1977–present
- Spouse: Manimegalai
- Children: Venkat Prabhu; Premgi Amaren; Preethi
- Relatives: Pavalar Varadharajan (brother); Ilaiyaraaja (brother); Karthik Raja (nephew); Yuvan Shankar Raja (nephew); Bhavatharini (niece); Vasuki Bhaskar (niece)
- Musical career
- Genre: Playback singing
- Instruments: Vocals, guitar

Gangai Amaran is an Indian composer, playback singer, lyricist, actor, film director and a screenwriter in Tamil films.

== Personal life ==
Gangai Amaran was born in Pannaipuram in Theni district, Tamil Nadu in December 1947, as the youngest son of Ramaswamy and Chinnathayi. He is the younger brother of noted music director Ilaiyaraaja and father of director and actor Venkat Prabhu and actor, composer and singer Premji Amaren. He had two more elder brothers, R. D. Bhaskar and Pavalar Varadharajan, both who died long back. Composers Karthik Raja, Yuvan Shankar Raja, singer Bhavatharini and costume designer Vasuki Bhaskar are his relations. His wife Manimegalai (Kala) died on 9 May 2021.

Regarding his name, Gangai was taken from a magazine of the same name which he read during his childhood, while Amaran is derived from a pseudonym Amar Singh, which he wanted to adopt for himself when he aimed to be a lyricist. He has had his personal differences with his elder brother Ilaiyaraaja where he mentioned about many controversial issues with him in his career.

== Career ==
=== Films ===
Amaran revealed that his debut film as a composer for Malargalile Oru Malligai starring Malaysia Vasudevan remained unreleased despite the soundtrack being released. Hence, Oru Vidukathai Oru Thodarkathai became his first film as composer to be released. Along with his brother Ilaiyaraaja, Gangai Amaran started his career as a composer and composed for many successful films such as Mouna Geethangal and Vazhvey Maayam (1983). Apart from composing, Amaran made his directorial debut with Kozhi Koovuthu (1982) and went on to direct many films including the highly successful Karagattakaran (1989). Themmangu Paattukaran was his last film as a director while Poonjolai which would have been the acting debut of his son Venkat Prabhu remains unreleased. Now he is working with Clusters media college.

=== Politics ===
Gangai Amaran also took a plunge in politics by joining BJP and also contested in RK Nagar constituency in April 2017 later withdrawn it. Apart from that, he also served as a member of Central Board of Film Certification.

== Filmography ==
=== Director ===
Year	Film	Notes
1982	Kozhi Koovuthu	Directorial Debut
1983	Kokkarakko	
1984	Pozhuthu Vidinchachu	
1984	Devi Sridevi	
1984	Vellai Pura Ondru	
1987	Enga Ooru Pattukaran	
1988	Sakkarai Panthal	
1988	Shenbagamae Shenbagamae	
1988	Koil Mani Osai	
1989	Karakattakkaran	
1989	Annanukku Jai	
1990	Ooru Vittu Ooru Vanthu	
1991	Kumbakarai Thangaiah	
1992	Villu Pattukaran	
1992	Chinnavar	
1992	Ponnuketha Purushan	
1993	Koyil Kaalai	
1994	Atha Maga Rathiname	
1997	Themmangu Paattukaaran	

=== Onscreen appearances ===
- Payanangal Mudivathillai (1982) (in the song "Thogai Ilamayil")
- Karagattakaran (1989)
- Ooru Vittu Ooru Vandhu (1990)
- Idhayam (1991)
- Chinnavar (1992)
- Unnidathil Ennai Koduthen (1998)
- Jodi (1999)
- Kandukondain Kandukondain (2000)
- Ullam Kollai Poguthey (2001)
- Thunichal (2010)
- Chennai 600028 II: Second Innings (2016)
- Arya Surya (2013)
- Yaanai (2022)
- Lenin Pandiyan (2026)

== Discography ==
=== Music Director ===
Year	Film	Language	Notes
1979	Karai Kadantha Kurathi	Tamil	
1979	Kuzhanthaiyai Thedi	Tamil	
1979	Oru Vidukadhai Oru Thodarkadhai	Tamil	
1979	Suvarillatha Chithirangal	Tamil	
1980	Ramaye Vayasukku Vanthutta	Tamil	
1980	Enga Ooru Rasathi	Tamil	
1980	Tharayil Pootha Malar	Tamil	
1981	Mouna Geethangal	Tamil	
1981	Sankarlal	Tamil	One song composed by Ilaiyaraaja
1982	Kanavugal Karpanaigal	Tamil	
1982	Vazhvey Maayam	Tamil	Dubbed Malayalam as Premaabhishekam
1983	En Priyame	Tamil	
1983	Imaigal	Tamil	
1983	Hello Madras Girl	Malayalam	
1983	Jeevitham	Malayalam	
1983	Neethibathi	Tamil	
1983	Sattam	Tamil	Dubbed Malayalam as Sneha bandham
1983	Justice Raja	Malayalam	
1984	Irumbu Kaigai	Tamil	
1984	Kudumbam	Tamil	
1984	Nalellam Pournami	Tamil	
1984	Nichayam	Tamil	
1984	Nyayam Ketkiraen	Tamil	
1984	Ungal Veetu Pillai	Tamil	
1984	Alakadalinakkare	Malayalam	
1985	Mannukketha Ponnu	Tamil	
1985	Aagaya Thamaraigal	Tamil	25th film
1985	Hello Yaar Pesurathu	Tamil	Co-composed with Ilaiyaraaja
1985	Puthiya Sagaptham	Tamil	
1985	Naan Ungal Rasigan	Tamil	
1986	Kanna Thorakkanum Saami	Tamil	Co-composed with Ilaiyaraaja
1986	Namma Ooru Nalla Ooru	Tamil	
1986	Ayyappa Bhakthiganangal Vol. 6	Tamil, Telugu, Malayalam, Kannada	Ayyappa devotional songs album from Tharangini. Released in all four south Indian languages.
1987	Chellakutti	Tamil	
1987	Chinna Thambi Periya Thambi	Tamil	
1987	Ettikki Potti	Tamil	
1987	Ondru Engal Jaathiye	Tamil	
1987	Oorkuruvi	Tamil	
1987	Ithu Oru Thodarkathai	Tamil	wrote all lyrics for this film
1987	Mizhiyorangalil	Malayalam	
1988	Anuragi	Malayalam	
1988	Jeeva	Tamil	
1988	En Thangachi Padichava	Tamil	
1988	Kabali	Tamil	
1988	Koil Mani Osai	Tamil	
1988	Raththa Dhanam	Tamil	
1988	Thappu Kanakku	Tamil	
1989	Pillaikkaga	Tamil	
1989	Rudra	Kannada	Dubbed in Tamil as Kushboo Kushboothan
1989	Swarakalpana	Telugu	
1989	Police Report	Telugu	
1990	Pachai Kodi	Tamil	
1991	Pondatti Pondattithan	Tamil	50th film
1991	Adhikari	Tamil	
1991	Rudhra	Tamil	
1993	Aadhityan	Tamil	
1994	Atha Maga Rathiname	Tamil	
2009	Ragavan	Tamil	
2010	Pugaippadam	Tamil	

=== Singer ===
Year	Film	Songs	Composer	Notes
1985	Neethaana Andha Kuyil	"Poojaiketha Poovidhu"	Ilaiyaraaja	
1985	Oru Kaidhiyin Diary	"Ithu Rosa Poovu"	Ilaiyaraaja	
1988	Pillaikkaga	"Mazhalaiyin"	Himself	
1990	Nila Pennae	"Kichang Kichang"	Vidyasagar	
1992	Solaiyamma	"Rasa Ilayarasa", "Manja Thanni"	Deva	
1993	Aadhityan	"Uchimalai"	Himself	
2006	Thimiru	"Goppurane"	Yuvan Shankar Raja	
2009	Ragavan	"Vaazhvai"	Himself	
2013	Arya Surya	"Mama", "Kala Kala", "Asaaru Usaaru"	Srikanth Deva	
2017	Andava Kaanom	"Oh Annan Maare"	Ashwamitra	
2026	Happy Raj	"Thuru Thuru"	Justin Prabhakaran	

=== Lyricist (partial discography) ===
Year	Film	Songs	Composer	Notes
1977	16 Vayathinile	"Sendhoora Poove"	Ilaiyaraaja	
1977	16 Vayathinile	"Cholam Vethakkaiyile"	Ilaiyaraaja	
1978	Kizhakke Pogum Rail	"Poovarasam Poothachu"	Ilaiyaraaja	
1978	Mullum Malarum	"Nitham Nitham Nellu soru"	Ilaiyaraaja	
1978	Mullum Malarum	"Raamane Aandaalum"	Ilaiyaraaja	
1978	Aval Appadithan	"Uravygal Thodarkatha"	Ilaiyaraaja	
1978	Aval Appadithan	"Panneer Pushpangale"	Ilaiyaraaja	
1979	Ponnu Oorukku Pudhusu	"Oram Po"	Ilaiyaraaja	
1979	Ponnu Oorukku Pudhusu	"Unakkenathanae"	Ilaiyaraaja	
1979	Agal Vilakku	"Etho Ninaivukal"	Ilaiyaraaja	
1979	Agal Vilakku	"Ellorum Porandhome"	Ilaiyaraaja	
1979	Puthiya Vaarpugal	"Thamthananam Thana Thaalam"	Ilaiyaraaja	
1979	Rosappu Ravikkaikari	"Vethala"	Ilaiyaraaja	
1979	Rosappu Ravikkaikari	"Maaman Oru Naal"	Ilaiyaraaja	
1979	Rosappu Ravikkaikari	"Yennullil Yengo"	Ilaiyaraaja	
1979	Uthiripookkal	"Yae Intha Poongathu"	Ilaiyaraaja	
1980	Aayiram Vaasal Idhayam	"Hey En Aasa"	Ilaiyaraaja	
1980	Nizhalgal	"Poongathavae thaal thiravai"	Ilaiyaraaja	
1980	Ellam Un Kairasi	"Cherikku Sevai seiyum"	Ilaiyaraaja	
1980	Gramathu Athiyayam	"Aatthu Mettuley"	Ilaiyaraaja	
1980	Gramathu Athiyayam	"Vaadaatha Rosapoo"	Ilaiyaraaja	
1980	Gramathu Athiyayam	"Ootha Kaathu"	Ilaiyaraaja	
1980	Gramathu Athiyayam	"Poovae Ithu"	Ilaiyaraaja	
1980	Guru	"Maamanukku Paramakudi"	Ilaiyaraaja	
1980	Moodu Pani	"Yen Iniya"	Ilaiyaraaja	
1980	Moodu Pani	"Paruva Kaalangalin"	Ilaiyaraaja	
1980	Moodu Pani	"Aasai Raja"	Ilaiyaraaja	
1980	Johnny	"Kaatril Enthan"	Ilaiyaraaja	
1980	Johnny	"Aasaiya Kaathula"	Ilaiyaraaja	
1980	Johnny	"Sinorita"	Ilaiyaraaja	
1980	Johnny	"Oru Iniya manathu"	Ilaiyaraaja	
1980	Kallukkul Eeram	"Siruponmani"	Ilaiyaraaja	
1980	Kallukkul Eeram	"Ennathil"	Ilaiyaraaja	
1980	Kallukkul Eeram	"Kothamalli"	Ilaiyaraaja	
1980	Kallukkul Eeram	"Enthan kairasi"	Ilaiyaraaja	
1980	Nenjathai Killathe	"Hey Thendralae"	Ilaiyaraaja	
1980	Nenjathai Killathe	"Uravenum"	Ilaiyaraaja	
1980	Nenjathai Killathe	"Mummy Peru"	Ilaiyaraaja	
1981	Raja Paarvai	"Vizhi Oraththu Kanavum"	Ilaiyaraaja	
1981	Sankarlal	"Thedinen Puthiya sugam"	Ilaiyaraaja	
1981	Enakkaga Kaathiru	"Oh Nenjame"	Ilaiyaraaja	
1981	Enakkaga Kaathiru	"Ooty Malai"	Ilaiyaraaja	
1981	Enakkaga Kaathiru	"Pani Mazhai"	Ilaiyaraaja	
1981	Indru Poi Naalai Vaa	"Mathana Mohana"	Ilaiyaraaja	
1981	Indru Poi Naalai Vaa	"Mere Pyari"	Ilaiyaraaja	
1981	Kadal Meengal	"Madhani Madhani"	Ilaiyaraaja	
1981	Karaiyellam Shenbagapoo	"Yerupudichavare"	Ilaiyaraaja	
1981	Karaiyellam Shenbagapoo	"Kalyanraman"	Ilaiyaraaja	
1981	Panneer Pushpangal	"Kodaikaala Kaatre"	Ilaiyaraaja	
1981	Panneer Pushpangal	"Aanandha Raagam"	Ilaiyaraaja	
1981	Panneer Pushpangal	"Poonthalir Aada"	Ilaiyaraaja	
1981	Panneer Pushpangal	"Vengaya Sambarum"	Ilaiyaraaja	
1981	Alaigal Oivathillai	"Putham Pudhu Kaalai"	Ilaiyaraaja	
1981	Alaigal Oivathillai	"Vaadi En Kappa Kelange"	Ilaiyaraaja	
1982	Pokkiri Raja	"Pokkirikku Pokkiri Raja"	Ilaiyaraaja	
1982	Pokkiri Raja	"Vaada En Machigala"	Ilaiyaraaja	
1982	Rani Theni	"Samy Sambo Saranam"	Ilaiyaraaja	
1982	Kozhi Koovuthu	"Aayarpadi Kannanane"	Ilaiyaraaja	
1983	Bhagavathipuram Railway Gate	"Samba Pudhu"	Ilaiyaraaja	
1983	Bhagavathipuram Railway Gate	"Sevvarali Thottathula"	Ilaiyaraaja	
1983	Inimai Idho Idho	"Aathoram Koovuthu"	Ilaiyaraaja	
1983	Inimai Idho Idho	"Kizhakke Vara"	Ilaiyaraaja	
1983	Thudikkum Karangal	"Thottu Kitta"	Ilaiyaraaja	
1983	Thudikkum Karangal	"Ullaththil"	Ilaiyaraaja	
1983	Thudikkum Karangal	"Valibam Vaadatha"	Ilaiyaraaja	
1984	Naanayam Illatha Naanayam	"Nottu"	Vijay Anand	
1984	Kai Kodukkum Kai	"Paattha Padichapulle"	Ilaiyaraaja	
1984	Nallavanukku Nallavan	"Vechukava"	Ilaiyaraaja	
1984	Naan Paadum Paadal	"Seer Kondu Vaa"	Ilaiyaraaja	
1984	Mudivalla Arambam	"Then Eduka Ponan"	Ilaiyaraaja	
1985	Naan Sigappu Manithan	"Kungumathu Meni"	Ilaiyaraaja	
1985	Andha Oru Nimidam	"Pachondiyye Kelada"	Ilaiyaraaja	
1985	Andha Oru Nimidam	"Kaathiruppadhu Pathiruppadhu"	Ilaiyaraaja	
1985	Un Kannil Neer Vazhinthal...	"Ilamai Itho"	Ilaiyaraaja	
1985	Un Kannil Neer Vazhinthal...	"Nethu Varai"	Ilaiyaraaja	
1986	Amman Kovil Kizhakale	All songs	Ilaiyaraaja	
1986	Vikram	''En Jodi Manja Kuruvi''	Ilaiyaraaja	
1986	Kadalora Kavithaigal	"Podinadaya Poravare"	Ilaiyaraaja	
1986	Mella Thirandhathu Kadhavu	"Ooru Sanam Thonkidichu"	Ilaiyaraaja	
1986	Mella Thirandhathu Kadhavu	"Kuzhaloodum Kannanukku"	Ilaiyaraaja	
1986	Mella Thirandhathu Kadhavu	"Sakkara Kattikku"	Ilaiyaraaja	
1986	Maaveeran	"Hey Maina"	Ilaiyaraaja	
1986	Maaveeran	"Sokku Podi"	Ilaiyaraaja	
1986	Maaveeran	"Nee Koduththatha"	Ilaiyaraaja	
1986	Thazhuvatha Kaigal	"Thottu Paaru"	Ilaiyaraaja	
1986	Thazhuvatha Kaigal	"Vizhiye"	Ilaiyaraaja	
1988	En Thangachi Padichava	All songs"	Ilaiyaraaja	
1988	Soora Samhaaram	"Aadum Neram Ithuthaan"	Ilaiyaraaja	
1988	Soora Samhaaram	"Neela Kuyile Solai Kuyile"	Ilaiyaraaja	
1988	Soora Samhaaram	"Naan Enbadhu Nee Allavo"	Ilaiyaraaja	
1989	Karagattakaran	All songs except Paattaalae Buddhi	Ilaiyaraaja	
1989	Vettri Vizhaa	''Seevi Sinukkeduthu''	Ilaiyaraaja	
1990	Keladi Kanmani	"Enna paduvathu"	Ilaiyaraaja	
1990	Keladi Kanmani	"Mannil intha"	Ilaiyaraaja	
1990	Mallu Vetti Minor	"Kaathiruntha Malli Malli''	Ilaiyaraaja	
1990	Mallu Vetti Minor	"Manasukkulle"	Ilaiyaraaja	
1990	Mallu Vetti Minor	"Unna Paartha"	Ilaiyaraaja	
1992	Chinnavar	All songs	Ilaiyaraaja	
1992	Villu Pattukaran	All songs	Ilaiyaraaja	
1992	Pandithurai	Enna Marantha	Ilaiyaraaja	
2004	Udhaya	"Thiruvellikeni Rani"	A R Rahman	
2007	Chennai 600028	"Jalsa"	Yuvan Shankar Raja	
2007	Chennai 600028	"Saroja Saamanikkalo"	Yuvan Shankar Raja	
2007	Malaikottai	"Yeh Aatha"	Mani Sharma	
2008	Saroja	"Aaja Meri"	Yuvan Shankar Raja	
2008	Saroja	"Kodaana Kodi"	Yuvan Shankar Raja	
2008	Saroja	"Nimirnthu Nil"	Yuvan Shankar Raja	
2010	Goa	"Ezhezhu"	Yuvan Shankar Raja	
2010	Goa	"Idhu Varai"	Yuvan Shankar Raja	
2010	Goa	"Vaaliba Vaa"	Yuvan Shankar Raja	
2011	Mankatha	"Vilaiyaadu Mankatha"	Yuvan Shankar Raja	
2011	Mankatha	"Ballelakka"	Yuvan Shankar Raja	
2014	Ennamo Nadakkudhu	"Va Idhu Nethiyadi"	Premgi Amaren	
2014	Megha	"Puthum Pudhu Kaalai''	Ilaiyaraaja	
2014	Vanavarayan Vallavarayan	"Tharaimelae Irunthae Naan"	Yuvan Shankar Raja	
2013	Biriyani	"Biriyani"	Yuvan Shankar Raja	
2013	Biriyani	"Edhirthu Nil"	Yuvan Shankar Raja	
2015	Massu Engira Masilamani	"Poochandi"	Yuvan Shankar Raja	
2018	Aruvadai	''Vannam kulanthuch''	Ravi Vijay Anandh	
2018	Jarugandi	''Seyiradha Senju Mudi''	Bobo Shashi	
2023	Custody	"Ettu Thesa"	Ilaiyaraaja	
2024	The Greatest of All Time	"Spark"	Yuvan Shankar Raja	
2024	Mr Zoo Keeper	''Kuttipuli''	Yuvan Shankar Raja	
2024	Mr Zoo Keeper	"Santhosha Saaral Mazhai''	Yuvan Shankar Raja	
2024	Kozhipannai Chelladurai	"Kathirundhen"	N. R. Raghunanthan	

=== Dubbing artist ===
- K. Bhagyaraj - Puthiya Vaarpugal (1979), Bhama Rukmani (1980)
