= Revathi filmography =

List of films featuring Revathi

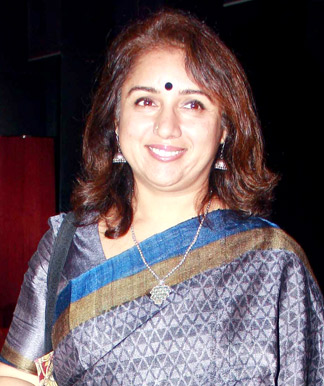
Revathi

Asha Kelunni, better known by her stage name Revathi, is an Indian actress and director, known for her works predominantly in Tamil cinema- in addition to Malayalam, Telugu, Hindi & Kannada films. She has won several accolades, including the National Film Awards in three different categories, and six Filmfare Awards South. She is one of the most successful leading actresses of South Indian cinema.

== As actress ==
=== Tamil ===
Year	Title	Role	Notes
1983	Mann Vasanai	Muthupechi	Filmfare Special Award – South
1984	Ponnu Pudichirukku		
1984	Kai Kodukkum Kai	Seetha	
1984	Pudhumai Penn	Seetha	
1984	Vaidhegi Kaathirunthaal	Vaidhegi	
1984	Unnai Naan Santhithen	Indumathi	
1985	Pournami Alaigal	Deepa	
1985	Oru Kaidhiyin Diary	Sharada	
1985	Kanni Rasi	Dhanalakshmi	
1985	Selvi	Selvi	
1985	Udhaya Geetham	Shanthi	
1985	Pagal Nilavu	Jyothi	
1985	Aagaya Thamaraigal	Shenbagam	
1985	Kunguma Chimizh	Rukmani	
1985	Prema Paasam		
1985	Thiramai	Bhanu	
1985	Aan Paavam	Revathi	
1986	December Pookal	Poornima aka Annam	
1986	Marumagal	Radha	
1986	Maragatha Veenai	Kokila	
1986	Revathy		
1986	Mouna Ragam	Divya	
1986	Lakshmi Vanthachu	Lakshmi	
1986	Punnagai Mannan	Malini	
1987	Lankeswaran	Seetha	
1987	Gramatthu Minnal	Valli Mayilu	
1989	Uthama Purushan	Lakshmi	
1990	Idhaya Thamarai	Manju	
1990	Arangetra Velai	Masha	
1990	Kizhakku Vaasal	Thaayamma	Tamil Nadu State Film Award for Best Actress; Cinema Express Award for Best Actress – Tamil; Nominated—Filmfare Award for Best Actress – Tamil
1990	Anjali	Chitra	Nominated—Filmfare Award for Best Actress – Tamil
1990	Sathriyan	Jaya	Guest appearance
1990	Raja Kaiya Vacha	Radha	Guest appearance
1991	Ayul Kaithi	Nithya	
1992	Chinna Pasanga Naanga	Marikolunthu	
1992	Deiva Vaakku	Hamsaveni	
1992	Thevar Magan	Panchavarnam	National Film Award for Best Supporting Actress; Filmfare Award for Best Actress – Tamil; Cinema Express Award for Best Actress – Tamil
1993	Marupadiyum	Thulasi	75th Film Filmfare Award for Best Actress – Tamil
1993	Pudhiya Mugam	Anjali	
1994	Paasamalargal	Asha	
1994	Magalir Mattum	Sathya	
1994	Priyanka	Priyanka	Filmfare Award for Best Actress – Tamil
1994	En Aasai Machan	Thayamma	
1994	Chinna Pulla	Valliammai	
1995	Avatharam	Ponnamma	
1995	Thamizhachi	Revathi	Guest appearance
1995	Gandhi Pirantha Mann	Lakshmi	
1995	Thotta Chinungi	Bhuvana	
1996	Meendum Savithri	Manju	
1996	Subash	Savithri	
1997	Iruvar	Maragatham	
1998	Thalaimurai	Naachchiyaa	Tamil Nadu State Film Award Special Prize for Best Actress; Nominated—Filmfare Award for Best Actress – Tamil
1998	Rathna	Lakshmi	
1999	Poovellam Kettuppar	Herself	Guest appearance
1999	Taj Mahal	Manoj's mother	
2001	Maayan		
2002	Red	Janaki	
2002	Thamizhan	Jaya	
2004	Vaanam Vasappadum	Karthik's mother	
2005	Ponniyin Selvan	Ponni	
2005	Kanda Naal Mudhal	Maragatham	
2006	Kaivantha Kalai	Mahalakshmi	
2008	Thoondil	Dr. Jayanthi	
2009	Vannathupoochi	Judge	Guest appearance
2011	Osthe	Velan's & Balan's mother	
2016	Amma Kanakku	Dr.Nandhini	
2017	Power Paandi	Poonthendral	Vijay Award for Best Supporting Actress; Nominated—Filmfare Award for Best Actress – Tamil
2018	Gulaebaghavali	Masha	Vikatan Award for Best Comedian — Female
2018	Keni	Aruna	
2019	Jackpot	Mashavaani	JFW Award for Best Comedian - Female
2019	Azhiyatha Kolangal 2	Sita	
2021	Navarasa	Savithri	Web series, Episode: Edhiri
2022	Thiruchitrambalam	Pazham's mother	Cameo appearance
2026	Jana Nayagan	Vetri's mother	Cameo appearance
2026	Anbil Avan	Raani Padmini	

=== Malayalam ===
Year	Title	Role	Notes
1983	Kattathe Kilikoodu	Asha Thampi	
1985	Ente Kaanakkuyil	Anuradha	
1987	Aankiliyude Tharattu	Sunitha Menon	
1987	Vandanam	Special appearance	
1988	Kakkothikkavile Appooppan Thaadikal	Lakshmi/Kakkothi/Vavachi	Filmfare Award for Best Actress – Malayalam
1988	Puravrutham	Devi	
1988	Moonnam Mura	Mini Johnson	
1989	Varavelpu	Rama	
1989	Najangalude Kochu Doctor	Mini	
1990	Ottayadipathakal	Sathi	
1991	Kilukkam	Nandini	
1992	Advaitham	Lakshmi Menon	
1993	Devasuram	Bhanumathi	
1993	Maya Mayuram	Nanda	
1993	Vaishnavar		
1994	Padheyam	Radha	
1995	Agnidevan	Sudarshana	
1997	Mangamma	Mangamma	
2001	Raavanaprabhu	Bhanumathi	
2002	Nandanam	Thankam	
2002	Kaiyethum Doorath	Dr. Omana Babunath	
2002	Krishna Pakshakkilikal	Mary	
2003	Gramaphone	Sara	
2003	Mizhi Randilum	Sridevi	
2005	Anandabhadram	Gayathri	
2009	Nammal Thammil	Lakshmi	
2010	Paattinte Palazhy	Raziya	
2010	Penpattanam	Girija	
2011	Indian Rupee	Dr. Sheela Koshy	
2012	Father's Day	Seethalekshmy	
2012	Molly Aunty Rocks!	Molly Mamen	Nominated—Filmfare Award for Best Actress – Malayalam Nominated—SIIMA Award for Best Actress – Malayalam
2018	Kinar	Aruna	
2019	Virus	C K Prameela	
2022	Bhoothakaalam	Asha	Kerala State Film Award for Best Actress; Filmfare Critics Award for Best Actress – Malayalam
2026	Patriot	Nalini Ramakrishnan	

=== Telugu ===
Year	Title	Role	Notes
1984	Manasa Veena	Veena	
1984	Seethamma Pelli	Seethamma	
1988	Rao Gari Illu	Chanti	
1989	Prema	Maggie	Nominated-Filmfare Award for Best Actress – Telugu
1989	Lankeswarudu	Swapna	
1990	Mrugathrushna		
1992	Raatri	Manisha Sharma (Mini)	
1993	Ankuram	Sindhura	Filmfare Award for Best Actress – Telugu
1993	Gaayam	Anitha	Nominated-Filmfare Award for Best Actress – Telugu
1996	Neti Savithri	Manju	
1998	Ganesh	Rangamma	
2002	Eeshwar	Sujatha	
2010	Gaayam 2	Anitha	
2014	Anukshanam	Shailaja	
2015	Loafer	Lakshmi	Nominated—Filmfare Award for Best Supporting Actress – Telugu
2016	Brahmotsavam	Mahalakshmi	
2017	Yuddham Sharanam	Seetha Lakshmi	
2021	Itlu Amma	Balasaraswathi	
2022	Major	Dhanalakshmi Unnikrishnan	

=== Hindi ===
Year	Title	Role	Notes
1991	Love	Maggie Pinto	
1992	Raat	Manisha Sharma (Mini)	
1992	Muskurahat	Nandini	
1994	Tarpan	Sumitra	
1996	Aur Ek Prem Kahani	Manga	
2003	Dhoop	Savita Kapoor	
2003	Darna Mana Hai	Pramila's mother	Story segment: Homework
2004	Ab Tak Chhappan	Namita Agashe	
2004	Phir Milenge	Dr. Raisingh	
2005	Dil Jo Bhi Kahey...	Sandhya Sinha	
2007	Nishabd	Amrita	
2014	2 States	Radha Swaminathan	
2015	Margarita, With a Straw	Shubhangini Kapoor	
2018	Udne Do	Tara Sheshadri	Short Film
2022	Major	Dhanalakshmi Unnikrishnan	
2022	Aye Zindagi	Revathi Rajan	
2023	Tiger 3	Maithili Menon	
2025	The StoryTeller	Saraswati	
2025	The Diplomat	External Minister	
2025	Raat Akeli Hai: The Bansal Murders	Dr. Rosie Panicker	
2026	Assi	Vasudha	

=== Kannada ===
Year	Title	Role	Notes
1989	Idu Saadhya	Indu	
1998	Nishyabda	Dr. Vinitha	

== As director ==
Year	Film	Language	Notes
2002	Mitr, My Friend	English	National Film Award for Best Feature Film in English; Also presenter
2004	Phir Milenge	Hindi	
2009	Kerala Cafe	Malayalam	"Makal" segment
2010	Mumbai Cutting	Hindi	"Parcel" segment
2022	Salaam Venky	Hindi	
2025	Good Wife	Tamil	Web Series, adaptation of The Good Wife

== As voice actor ==
Year	Film	Dubbed for	Language
1995	Pasumpon	Saranya Ponvannan	Tamil
1995	Aasai	Suvalakshmi	Tamil
1996	Devaraagam	Sridevi	Malayalam
1997	Minsara Kanavu	Kajol	Tamil
1997	Ullasam	Maheswari	Tamil
1999	Megham	Pooja Batra	Malayalam
2000	Kandukondain Kandukondain	Tabu	Tamil
2001	Vedham	Divya Unni	Tamil
2005	Chandrolsavam	Khushbu	Malayalam
2020	Punyakoti (Animated film)	Cow	Sanskrit

== As playback singer ==
Year	Title	Film	Language	Composer	Notes
2021	"Thiruppavai"	Margazhi Thingal-Music Video by Saregama Tamil	Tamil	Ravi G	Also actress in the music album along with Suhasini, others

== Television ==
=== As an actress ===
Year	Title	Language	Channel
1990	Ambalakkara UP School	Malayalam	DD Malayalam
1990	Iravil Oru Pagal	Tamil	Doordarshan
1991	Penn	Tamil	Doordarshan
1994	Revathy	Tamil	Sun TV
1997	Doctors	Tamil	Sun TV
1998	Anbu Maman	Tamil	Sun TV
1999–2000	Nirangal	Tamil	Sun TV
1999	Chinna Chinna Aasai	Tamil	Sun TV
2000	Boom Boom Shaka Laka	Tamil	Sun TV
2001	Kadhai Kadhaiyaam Karanamaam	Tamil	Vijay TV
2002	Sindhanaigal	Tamil	Jaya TV
2003	Pudumai Penngal	Tamil	KTV
2003	Friends	Tamil	KTV
2011	Yathumagi Nindrai	Tamil	Zee Tamil
2011–2012	Kanamarayathu	Malayalam	Mazhavil Manorama
2013	Malayalee House	Surya TV	
2013–2014	Champions	Tamil	Sun TV
2016	Samvidhanam Revathy	Malayalam	Mazhavil Manorama
2017–2020	Azhagu	Tamil	Sun TV
2020	Yadunandanam	Malayalam	Surya TV
2022	Modern Love Hyderabad	Telugu	Amazon Prime Video
2022	Kaun Banega Crorepati	Hindi	Sony Entertainment Television
2023	Tooth Pari: When Love Bites	Hindi	Netflix

=== As Creative Head ===
Year	Title	Channel	Notes
2011	Yathumagi Nindrai	Zee Tamil	Creative Head in this TV serial along with Rohini

== See also ==
- List of Indian film actresses
