= List of Tamil films of 1990 =

Post-amendment to the Tamil Nadu Entertainments Tax Act 1939 on 1 April 1958, Gross jumped to 140 per cent of Nett Commercial Taxes Department disclosed ₹70 crore in entertainment tax revenue for the year.

A list of films produced in the Tamil film industry in India in 1990 by release date:

== Released films ==
Opening		Title	Director	Cast	Production	Music director
J A N	14	Enakkoru Neethi	K. S. Gopalakrishnan	Siraj, Chithra, Pallavi	Anil Creations	V. Kumar
J A N	14	Idhaya Thamarai	K. Rajeshwar	Karthik, Revathi	Amardeep Creations	Shankar–Ganesh
J A N	14	Kavalukku Kettikaran	Santhana Bharathi	Prabhu, Nirosha	Thirai Koodam	Ilaiyaraaja
J A N	14	Nalla Kaalam Porandaachu	T. P. Gajendran	Prabhu, Ramya Krishnan	Mother Cine Productions	Shankar–Ganesh
J A N	14	Pachai Kodi	Manoj Kumar	Pandiarajan, Nirosha	Guru Sri Shanthi Productions	Gangai Amaran
J A N	14	Panakkaran	P. Vasu	Rajinikanth, Gautami	Sathya Movies	Ilaiyaraaja
J A N	14	Pulan Visaranai	R. K. Selvamani	Vijayakanth, Rupini	I. V. Cine Productions	Ilaiyaraaja
F E B	2	Aadi Velli	Rama Narayanan	Nizhalgal Ravi, Seetha	Sri Thenaandal Films	Shankar–Ganesh
F E B	2	Manasukketha Maapillai	G. Ravi Raja	Pandiarajan, Rohini	Amudhasurabi Pictures	Chandrabose
F E B	9	Pattikattan	T. S. Krishna Kumar	Rahman, Rupini, Goundamani, Senthil	Shenbagam Movie Creations	Shankar–Ganesh
F E B	9	Vaazhkai Chakkaram	Manivannan	Sathyaraj, Gautami	Vivekananda Pictures	Shankar–Ganesh
F E B	16	En Uyir Thozhan	Bharathiraja	Babu, Rama, Thennavan	B. R. Art Films	Ilaiyaraaja
F E B	16	Mr. Karthik	Kalaivanan Kannadasan	Karthik, Sivaranjani	Varalakshmi Creations	V. S. Narasimhan
F E B	16	Paattali Magan	Senthilnathan	Arjun, Sindhu, Goundamani, Senthil	Anbu Lakshmi Films	Sangeetha Rajan
F E B	16	Salem Vishnu	Thyagarajan	Thyagarajan, Rupini	Lakshmi Shanthi Movies	Sangeetha Rajan
F E B	23	Arangetra Velai	Fazil	Prabhu, Revathi, V. K. Ramasamy	Sunitha Productions	Ilaiyaraaja
F E B	23	Paattukku Naan Adimai	Shanmuga Rajan	Ramarajan, Kushboo, Rekha, Goundamani, Senthil	Shri Mishri Productions	Ilaiyaraaja
M A R	2	Rajavin Paarvai	A. V. Babu	Ramakrishna Raja, Samundeeswari	Sri Rani Magal Films	Malaysia Vasudevan
M A R	2	Valiba Vizhayattu	K. Sornam	Mohan, Sadhana, Divya	S. S. K. Films	Shankar–Ganesh
M A R	9	Paalam	Karvannan	Murali, M. N. Nambiar, Kitty	S. S. Screens	N. S. T. Rajesh
M A R	9	Parigaram	Bhama Manalan	Krishna, Kovai Sarala	Sree Kamesh Art Movies	
M A R	9	Pengal Veettin Kangal	T. P. Gajendran	K. R. Vijaya, Chandrasekhar, Urvashi, Pallavi, Pandiyan, Anand Babu, Vaishnavi, Dileep, Latha	K. R. G. Movies International	Shankar–Ganesh
M A R	16	Kavithai Paadum Alaigal	T. K. Bose	Raj Mohan, Janani	K. B. Arts	Ilaiyaraaja
M A R	16	Vetri Malai	V. S. Shanmugam	Murali, Seetha, Pallavi	Maruthi Movieland	Shankar–Ganesh
M A R	17	Jagathalaprathapan	Shankar–Ganesh	Mohan, Rakhi Sri, Divya	Rani Cine Arts	Shankar–Ganesh
M A R	17	Manaivi Oru Manickam	Chozharajan	Arjun, Radha, Mukesh, Sadhana	Sri Thenaandal Films	Shankar–Ganesh
M A R	17	Unnai Solli Kutramillai	Ameerjan	Karthik, Sithara	Kavithalayaa Productions	Ilaiyaraaja
A P R	13	En Veedu En Kanavar	Senbaga Raman	Suresh, Nadhiya	Preethi Indhar Combines	B. Surendar
A P R	14	Kalyana Rasi	K. Sivaprasad	Karthik, Ranjani, Apoorva	Sankaraalaya Pictures	Manoj–Gyan
A P R	14	Muthalali Amma	V. C. Guhanathan	Bhanu Chander, Kanaka, Prameela	Thirumurugan Combines	Chandrabose
A P R	14	Pondatti Thevai	Parthiban	Parthiban, Ashwini, Sindhu	Vivek Chithra Productions	Ilaiyaraaja
A P R	14	Pudhu Padagan	S. Thanu	Vijayakanth, Amala	Kalaippuli International	S. Thanu
A P R	14	Pudhu Vasantham	Vikraman	Murali, Sithara, Anand Babu, Raja, Charle	Super Good Films	S. A. Rajkumar
A P R	14	Seetha	S. A. Chandrasekhar	Rahman, Gautami, Kanaka, R. Sarathkumar	Lalithaanjali Fine Arts	Vidyasagar
A P R	14	Chilambu	Nethaji	Murali, Rohini	Devanayagi Films	M. S. Viswanathan
A P R	14	Thangathin Thangam	Siraj	Ramarajan, Ragasudha, Goundamani, Senthil	Anbalaya Pictures	S. A. Rajkumar
A P R	14	Ulagam Pirandhadhu Enakkaga	S. P. Muthuraman	Sathyaraj, Gautami, Rupini, Goundamani, Senthil	AVM Productions	R. D. Burman
A P R	14	Varavu Nalla Uravu	Visu	Visu, Kodai Mazhai Vidya, Raghav, Rekha,	Kavithalayaa Productions	Shankar–Ganesh
A P R	27	Maruthu Pandi	Manoj Kumar	Ramki, Nirosha, Seetha	Ponmanam Films	Ilaiyaraaja
M A Y	4	Sakthi Parasakthi	Rama Narayanan	Sivaji Manohar, Seetha	Thirupathi Movies	Shankar–Ganesh
M A Y	11	Pagalil Pournami	Cochin Haneefa	Sivakumar, Radhika, Lizy	Kalpana Arts	Ilaiyaraaja
M A Y	11	Periya Veetu Pannakkaran	N. K. Viswanathan	Karthik, Kanaka	Meenachi Arts	Ilaiyaraaja
M A Y	12	Pattanamdhan Pogalamadi	C. P. Kolappan	Rahman, Radhika, Rupini	Anitha Cine Productions	Shankar–Ganesh
M A Y	18	Murugane Thunai	P. S. Marimuthu	Rajesh, Sudha Chandran	Murugaalayam Films	K. V. Mahadevan
M A Y	25	Amma Pillai	R. C. Sakthi	Ramki, Seetha	Vimala Movies	Shankar–Ganesh
M A Y	25	Neengalum Herothan	V. Sekhar	Nizhalgal Ravi, Ram Manohar, Rathna, Divya, Goundamani, Senthil	Thuthukudi Film Entertainment	Gangai Amaran
J U N	1	Nyayangal Jayikkattum	Sivachandran	Sivakumar, Lakshmi, Aishwarya	Kavitha Chithra Films	Shankar–Ganesh
J U N	1	Sandhana Kaatru	Manivannan	Vijayakanth, Gautami	Kamala Jothi Combines	Shankar–Ganesh
J U N	2	Periya Idathu Pillai	Senthilnathan	Arjun, Kanaka	Jubilee Arts	Chandrabose
J U N	15	Pathimoonam Number Veedu	Baby	Nizhalgal Ravi, Sadhana, Sripriya	Aasha Creations	Sangeetha Rajan
J U N	15	Athisaya Piravi	S. P. Muthuraman	Rajinikanth, Kanaka, Sheeba	Lakshmi Productions	Ilaiyaraaja
J U N	15	Mounam Sammadham	K. Madhu	Mammootty, Amala	Kay. Cee. Film Combines	Ilaiyaraaja
J U N	22	Madurai Veeran Enga Saami	Shanmuga Priyan	Sathyaraj, Rupini, Goundamani, Senthil	K. B. Films	Ilaiyaraaja
J U N	22	Manaivi Vantha Neram	'Karaikudi' Narayanan	Rahman, Radha, Sithara	K. R. G. Movies International	Chandrabose
J U N	22	Sigappu Nirathil Chinnappoo	R. Selvaraj	Rathnakumar, Rekha	Rajeshwari Films	Jay Sekar
J U N	29	Vedikkai En Vadikkai	Visu	S. Ve. Shekher, Pallavi, Visu	G. V. Films	Shankar–Ganesh
J U N	29	Mattukara Mannaru	Thendral Thyagarajan	Chandrasekhar, Ramesh Raj, Arundhathi, Ashwini	Kaveri Films	Deva
J U L	6	Adhisaya Manithan	Velu Prabhakaran	Gautami, Nizhalgal Ravi, Raja, Chithra	Perfect Cine Arts	Premi-Seeni
J U L	6	Nila Pennae	V. Thamizhazhagan	Anand, Divya Bharati	Sathya Movies	Vidyasagar
J U L	13	Anjali	Mani Ratnam	Raghuvaran, Revathi, Tarun Kumar, Shamili, Shruti	GV Films	Ilaiyaraaja
J U L	13	Kizhakku Vaasal	R. V. Udayakumar	Karthik, Revathi, Kushboo	Sathya Jyothi Films	Ilaiyaraaja
J U L	13	Naanum Indha Ooruthan	Sekar Raja	Murali, Kushboo	Sudhalaya Productions	Shankar–Ganesh
J U L	13	Ooru Vittu Ooru Vanthu	Gangai Amaran	Ramarajan, Gautami, Goundamani, Senthil	S. B. D. Films	Ilaiyaraaja
J U L	20	Sirayil Pootha Chinna Malar	Amirtham	Vijayakanth, Bhanupriya	Sri Thirumala Art Productions	Ilaiyaraaja
J U L	27	Aavathellam Pennale	Raj Mukundhan	S. Ve. Shekher, Viji	Sun Rise Films	Shankar–Ganesh
J U L	27	Keladi Kannmanii	Vasanth	S. P. Balasubrahmanyam, Radhika, Ramesh Aravind, Anju	Vivek Chithra Productions	Ilaiyaraaja
J U L	27	Nangal Puthiyavargal	R. G. Elavalagan	Murali, Rekha	Moovender Movies	Chandrabose
J U L	28	Aarathi Edungadi	K. Chandranath	Rahman, Kushboo	Murali Cine Arts	Shankar–Ganesh
A U G	2	Inaindha Kaigal	N. K. Viswanathan	Arun Pandian, Ramki, Nirosha, Sindhu	Thiraichirpi	Manoj–Gyan
A U G	10	Durga	Rama Narayanan	Nizhalgal Ravi, Kanaka, Shamili	Sri Thenaandal Films	Shankar–Ganesh
A U G	10	Enga Ooru Aatukkaran	Sripriya	Sripriya, Chandrakanth, Kanaka	Yamini Cine Arts	Yuvaraja
A U G	15	Oru Pudhiya Kadhai	R. Bala Subbaih	Prabhuraj, Meena	Kumar Movies	Uma Kannadasan
A U G	15	Velai Kidaichuduchu	P. Vasu	Sathyaraj, Gautami	Sree Rajakaali Amman Enterprises	Hamsalekha
A U G	24	Agni Theertham	Sree Bharathi	Ravikanth, Bhuvanesh, Yuvasri	Sindhu Art Pictures	Shankar–Ganesh
A U G	24	My Dear Marthandan	Prathap K. Pothan	Prabhu, Kushboo, Goundamani	Sivaji Productions	Ilaiyaraaja
A U G	24	Pattanathil Petti	R. Ramesh Kumar	Sivaji Manohar, Shanthi, Goundamani, Senthil, V. K. Ramasamy, Manorama	Mother Cine Productions	Shankar–Ganesh
A U G	31	Pudhu Varisu	Rajasekhar	Pandiarajan, Rohini	Uzhaikkum Karangal Art Productions	Chandrabose
A U G	31	Aalay Pathu Malai Mathu	M. Venkat Vasu	Nizhalgal Ravi, Chandrasekhar, Madhuri, Bhagya, Radha Ravi	Kunjapanai Mariamman Films	Shankar–Ganesh
S E P	5	Thalattu Padava	R. Sundarrajan	Parthiban, Kushboo, Rupini	Raavuthar Films	Ilaiyaraaja
S E P	7	Oru Veedu Iru Vaasal	K. Balachander	Kumaresh, Ganesh, Yamini, Vaishnavi	Kavithalayaa Productions	V. S. Narasimhan
S E P	7	Puriyaadha Pudhir	K. S. Ravikumar	Rahman, Rekha, Anand Babu, Raghuvaran	Super Good Films	S. A. Rajkumar
S E P	7	Sathyam Sivam Sundaram	Rama Narayanan	Raja, Radha	Sree Durga Films	Shankar–Ganesh
S E P	14	Andhi Varum Neram	R. Ramesh Kumar	Nizhalgal Ravi, Chandrakanth, Latha, Rama	G. S. Productions	Shankar–Ganesh
S E P	14	Engitta Mothathay	R. Sundarrajan	Vijayakanth, Shobana, Kushboo	Rajeshwari Productions	Ilaiyaraaja
S E P	14	Namathu Deivam	Kasi Arasu	Mohana Muthu, Manorama, 'Baby' Sridevi	Apple Creations	
S E P	15	Palaivana Paravaigal	Senthilnathan	R. Sarathkumar, Anandaraj, Udhayan, Dharani	Vaasan Brothers	Ilayagangai
S E P	21	Sathan Sollai Thattathe	Rama Narayanan	Senthil, Pandiyan, Chandrasekhar, Janagaraj	Kookoo Films	Shankar–Ganesh
O C T	5	Thiyagu	S. P. Muthuraman	Raghuvaran, Rekha, Madhuri	AVM Productions	Shankar–Ganesh
O C T	17	60 Naal 60 Nimidam	K. Rajavarman	Raj Thilak, Chithra, Vaishnavi	K. L. J. Combines	Kannan
O C T	17	Amman Kovil Thiruvizha	P. R. Somasunder	Nizhalgal Ravi, Kanaka, Goundamani, Senthil	Sri Bairavi Combines	Ilaiyaraaja
O C T	17	Avasara Police 100	K. Bhagyaraj	M. G. Ramachandran, K. Bhagyaraj, Gautami	Sudha Cine Movies	K. Bhagyaraj
O C T	17	Chatriyan	K. Subaash	Vijayakanth, Bhanupriya, Revathi	Aalayam Productions	Ilaiyaraaja
O C T	17	En Kadhal Kanmani	T. C. Joy	Vikram, Rekha Nambiar	Progressive Cine Arts	L. Vaidyanathan
O C T	17	Mallu Vetti Minor	Manobala	Sathyaraj, Shobana, Seetha	Everest Films	Ilaiyaraaja
O C T	17	Michael Madana Kama Rajan	Singeetam Srinivasa Rao	Kamal Haasan, Urvashi, Kushboo, Rupini	P. A. Art Productions	Ilaiyaraaja
O C T	17	Pudhiya Kaatru	Karvannan	Murali, Meenatchi	Coverfield Creations	Rajesh
O C T	17	Puthu Paatu	Panchu Arunachalam	Ramarajan, Suman Ranganathan	Ilaiyaraaja Creations	Ilaiyaraaja
O C T	17	Sirayil Sila Raagangal	Rajendra Kumar	Murali, Pallavi	Sri Lakshmi Vani Pictures	Ilaiyaraaja
N O V	2	Vellaiya Thevan	Manoj Kumar	Ramki, Kanaka	Eknaath Movie Creations	Ilaiyaraaja
N O V	4	Uchi Veyil	Jaya Sarathi	Srividya, Uma, Delhi Ganesh	Juvaala Productions	L. Vaidyanathan
N O V	16	Pudhu Pudhu Ragangal	Adhavan	Anand Babu, Sithara	Theivaanai Movies	S. A. Rajkumar
N O V	16	Vaigasi Poranthachu	Radha Bharathi	Prashanth, Kaveri	Anbalaya Films	Deva
N O V	23	Aatha Naan Pass Ayittaen	M. K. Sai Mohan	Arjun, Malashri, Shantipriya	Anitha Pictures	Vidyasagar
N O V	23	Aerikarai Poongaatre	M. N. Jai Sundar	Liaquat Ali Khan, Devipriya, Rajeev, Pallavi	Liyo Pictures	M. S. Viswanathan
N O V	23	Namma Ooru Poovatha	Manivasagam	Murali, Gautami, Goundamani, Senthil	Raja Pushpa Pictures	Deva
N O V	23	Sathya Vaakku	Arvindraj	Prabhu, Shobana	Commercial Art Creations	Manoj–Gyan
N O V	23	Thangaikku Oru Thalattu	K. S. Madhangan	Arjun, Seetha	Raghavendralaya Cine Creations	Shankar–Ganesh
N O V	24	Thai Maasam Poovaasam	Ameerjan	Radha Ravi, Abdul Majeed, Devaki	B. R. R. Art Enterprises	V. R. Sampath Selvan
N O V	30	Nadigan	P. Vasu	Sathyaraj, Kushboo, Goundamani	Raj Films International	Ilaiyaraaja
N O V	30	Urudhi Mozhi	R. V. Udayakumar	Prabhu, Sivakumar, Geetha, Santhini	Yaathavaalayaa Productions	Ilaiyaraaja
D E C	7	Ethir Kaatru	Muktha S. Sundar	Karthik, Kanaka	Muktha Films	Ilaiyaraaja
D E C	7	Raja Kaiya Vacha	Suresh Krissna	Prabhu, Gautami	Ananthi Films	Ilaiyaraaja
D E C	14	Nee Sirithaal Deepavali	Malaysia Vasudevan	Sivakumar, Sulakshana	Usha Productions	Ilaiyaraaja
D E C	14	Pudhiya Sarithiram	K. N. Muruganandam	Ramki, Ramya Krishnan	Kalaignan Combines	Vidyasagar
D E C	14	Vaazhnthu Kaattuvom	R. Krishnamoorthy	Ramki, Gautami	Vivekananda Pictures	Shankar–Ganesh
D E C	21	Avanga Namma Ooru Ponnunga	Kaja Mohideen	Vignesh, Viji	Santhosha Cine Arts	Shankar–Ganesh
D E C	28	Engal Swamy Ayyappan	Dasarathan	Dasarathan, Parthiban, Anand Babu, Dilip, Hari Raj	Deepa Hari Films	Dasarathan
