= List of awards and nominations received by Revathi =

Revathi awards and nominations
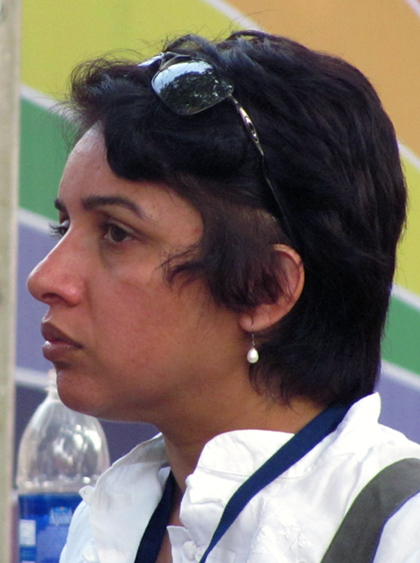
- Revathi in 2010
| Awards & nominations |
| Award | Won | Nominated |
| Cinema Express Awards | 5 | 5 |
| Film Fans Associate Awards | 8 | 8 |
| Filmfare Awards South | 7 | 12 |
| National Film Awards | 3 | 3 |
| Ananda Vikatan Cinema Awards | 1 | 1 |
| Kerala State Film Award | 1 | 1 |
| Star Screen Awards | 0 | 1 |
| Tamil Nadu State Film Awards | 2 | 2 |
- Total number of wins and nominations
| Totals | 27 | 33 |

Asha Kutty Nair, known by the stage name Revathi, is an Indian actress and film director, known for her works predominantly in Tamil and Malayalam cinema. She has won several accolades, including three National Film Awards in three different categories, and six Filmfare Awards South. Revathi is a trained Bharatanatyam dancer, having studied since the age of seven and performed her arangetram in Chennai in 1979. Apart from films, Revathi has been involved in a variety of social organisations, the most notable being the Banyan, Ability foundation, Tanker foundation and Vidyasagar, and has also served as a member of several film festivals including the Chennai International Film Festival and the International Film Festival of India.

== National Film Awards ==
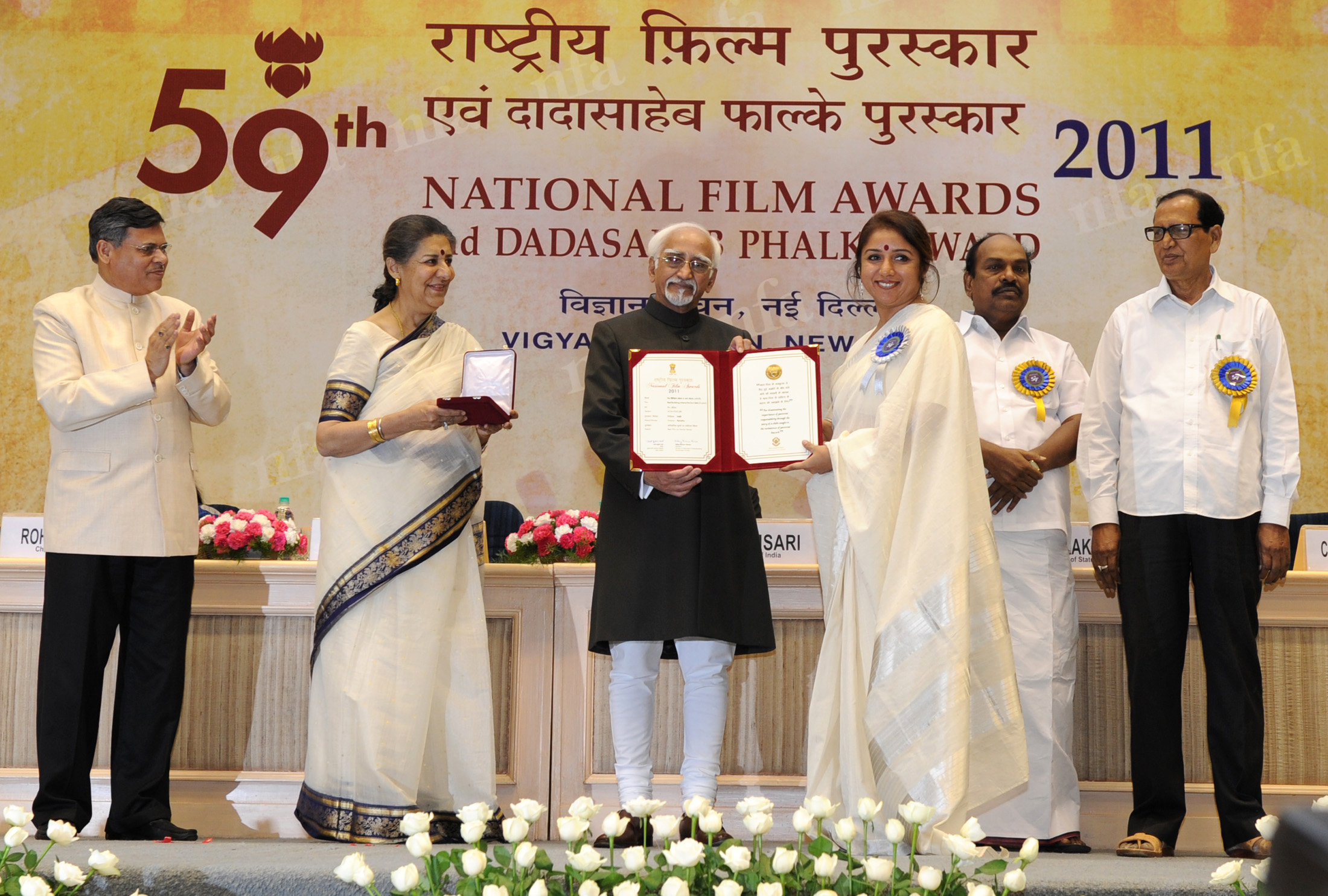
Hamid Ansari presenting the Rajat Kamal Award to Revathi for Best Non-feature Film on Family Welfare Red Building where the Sun Sets at the 59th National Film Awards function

| Year | Nominated work | Award | Result | Ref. |
|---|---|---|---|---|
| 1992 | Thevar Magan | Best Supporting Actress | Won | |
| 2001 | Mitr, My Friend | Best Feature Film in English | Won | |
| 2011 | Red Building Where the Sun Sets | Best Non-Feature Film on Family Welfare | Won | |

== Cinema Express Awards ==
| Year | Nominated work | Award | Result | Ref. |
|---|---|---|---|---|
| 1984 | Seethamma Pelli | Best Telugu Actress | Won | |
| 1990 | Anjali | Best Tamil Actress | Won | |
| 1992 | Kilukkam | Best Malayalam Actress | Won | |
| 1992 | Thevar Magan | Best Tamil Actress | Won | |
| 1994 | En Aasai Machan | Special Award - Best Tamil Actress | Won | |

== Filmfare Awards South ==
| Year | Nominated work | Award | Result | Ref. |
|---|---|---|---|---|
| 1983 | Mann Vasanai | Special Award | Won | |
| 1988 | Kakkothikkavile Appooppan Thaadikal | Best Malayalam Actress | Won | |
| 1989 | Prema | Best Telugu Actress | Nominated | |
| 1992 | Thevar Magan | Best Tamil Actress | Won | |
| 1992 | Ankuram | Best Telugu Actress | Won | |
| 1993 | Marupadiyum | Best Tamil Actress | Won | |
| 1993 | Gaayam | Best Telugu Actress | Nominated | |
| 1994 | Priyanka | Best Tamil Actress | Won | |
| 2012 | Molly Aunty Rocks! | Best Malayalam Actress | Nominated | |
| 2014 | Loafer | Best Telugu Supporting Actress | Nominated | |
| 2017 | Pa. Pandi | Best Tamil Actress | Nominated | |
| 2022 | Bhoothakalam | Best Malayalam Actress | Nominated | |
| 2022 | Bhoothakalam | Critics Best Actress – Malayalam | Won | |

== Kerala State Film Awards ==
| Year | Nominated work | Award | Result | Ref. |
|---|---|---|---|---|
| 2022 | Bhoothakalam | Best Actress | Won | |

== Ananda Vikadan Film Awards ==
| Year | Nominated work | Award | Result | Ref. |
|---|---|---|---|---|
| 2019 | Gulaebaghavali | Best Comedian – Female | Won | |

== Screen Awards ==
| Year | Nominated work | Award | Result | Ref. |
|---|---|---|---|---|
| 2004 | Dhoop | Best Supporting Actress | Nominated | |

== South Indian International Movie Awards ==
| Year | Nominated work | Award | Result | Ref. |
|---|---|---|---|---|
| 2012 | Molly Aunty Rocks | SIIMA Award for Best Malayalam Film Actress | Nominated | |
| 2019 | Gulaebaghavali | SIIMA Award for Best Comedian | Nominated | |

== Tamil Nadu State Film Awards ==
| Year | Nominated work | Award | Result | Ref. |
|---|---|---|---|---|
| 1990 | Kizhakku Vasal | Best Actress | Won | |
| 1998 | Thalaimurai | Special Prize For Best Actress | Won | |

== The Mylapore Academy Berkley Drama Award ==
- 1984 – Best Actress in Television for Penn
- 1989 – Best Actress in Television for Iravil Oru Pagal

== International Film Festival of India ==
- 2002 – Silver Peacock Jury Award for Mitr, My Friend

== International Film Festival of Kerala ==
- 2009 – NETPAC Award for Best Malayalam Film for Kerala Cafe

== Vijay Awards ==
- 2018 – Vijay Award for Best Supporting Actress for Pa. Pandi

== Screen Awards ==
- 2004 – Best Supporting Actress for Dhoop

== Zee Cine Awards ==
- 2004 – Best Supporting Actress for Dhoop

== JFW Award ==
- 2019 – Best actress in a comic role for her performance in Gulaebaghavali.
- 2020 – Best actress in a comic role for her performance in Jackpot.

== Other awards ==
- 1992: Received title of Kalaimamani Award by the Government of Tamil Nadu, which is the highest state honour in the field of Arts.
- 2007: Karmaveer Puraskaar: CMS Media Citizen
