= Kasu Irukkanum =

- Directed by: R. Kumaran; Priyavan
- Written by: G. Ramachandran
- Produced by: R. P. Poorani
- Starring: Vishwa; Payal; Nanditha Jennifer; Laksha; Kadhal Sukumar; Arul; K. Bhagyaraj
- Cinematography: R. R. Kumar
- Edited by: P. Mohanraj
- Music by: Kavin Saradha; Raj Shankar
- Production company: G. R. Gold Films
- Release date: 4 May 2007
- Running time: 145 minutes
- Country: India
- Language: Tamil

Kasu Irukkanum (transl. There needs to be money) is a 2007 Tamil language thriller film directed by R. Kumaran and Priyavan, produced by R. P. Poorani, and editing by P. Mohanraj. The film stars newcomer Vishwa, Payal, Nanditha Jennifer, Laksha, Kadhal Sukumar, Arul, and K. Bhagyaraj, while J. Livingston, Anusha, Singamuthu, Kovai Senthil, and Bonda Mani playing supporting roles. The film had music by Kavin Saradha and Raj Shankar, cinematography by R. K. Kumar, and editing by P. Mohanraj. The film released on 4 May 2007.

== Plot ==
Ashok (Vishwa), Ani (Payal), Viji (Nanditha Jennifer), Divya (Laksha), Pravin (Kadhal Sukumar), and Tharun (Arul) are good friends, and their only aim in life is to make money. They steal from banks, hijack container trucks, and rob rich people. The police have been actively seeking them. The police inspector Manikkavel (J. Livingston) is charged with catching them. The friends, on the run, travel from town to town and are later hosted by a mysterious man named G. R. (K. Bhagyaraj) in his bungalow. The fugitives introduce themselves as youngsters who were lost in the woods.

Ashok and Ani then fall in love and decide to get married. Viji, who was secretly in love with Ashok, is heartbroken. In the past, Ashok was a final-year MIS student at Harvard University. When his parents died, Ashok came to his native city, where he realized that his parents had been killed by his greedy uncle for inheriting his family's wealth. The innocent Ashok was then sent to a mental asylum by his uncle, his lover, and his best friend who betrayed him for money. Ashok escaped from the mental asylum and killed all three. Since that day, he realized that money is the most important thing in life, and so he became a thief.

Thereafter, Divya and Tharun were found dead far from the bungalow. Viji suspects their host G. R. for killing her friends and stabs him. G. R. confesses that he did not kill them. He also says that his sister Mahalakshmi (Anusha) was killed in the same way. Ashok and Ani reveal to Pravin that they were the murderers, and they kill him. Ashok and Ani wanted to vanish, so they killed their partners, who were the only witnesses to their crimes, and their last target is Viji. When Ashok tries to kill Viji, she confesses her love for him. Ashok then changes his mind and accepts her love. He then poisons Ani's drink, and she dies after drinking it. The police finally found the friends' hiding place. Ashok and Viji eventually escape from there.

Ashok and Viji settle in a remote place with their caravan. Viji attempts to kill Ashok for murdering her friends, but she fails, and the psychopath Ashok chokes her to death. G. R. tracks Ashok down and tries to murder him for killing his innocent sister, but the police arrives at the right moment and shoots Ashok dead.

== Cast ==
- Vishwa as Ashok
- Payal as Ani D'Souza
- Nanditha Jennifer as Vijayalakshmi alias Viji
- Laksha as Divya Menon
- Kadhal Sukumar as Pravin
- Arul as Tharun
- K. Bhagyaraj as G. R.
- J. Livingston as Manikkavel
- Anusha as Mahalakshmi
- Singamuthu
- Kovai Senthil as Gurukkal
- Bonda Mani as Bonda Mani
- Thalapathy Dinesh
- Muthukaalai
- Scissor Manohar
- G. Ramachandran as Ramayee
- Helen Sweety as Mini
- Vadivelu David as David
- Amjad Khan
- Anwar Ali Khan
- Vijay Ganesh
- Tajkhan
- Poovai Sekhar
- Imman Annachi in an uncredited role

== Production ==
The film producer G. Ramachandran, who has previously produced Manu Needhi (2000) and Sound Party (2004), introduced his son Vishwa as the film's hero. There are three pairs in the film Vishwa, Kadhal Sukumar, and Arul as heroes and Payal, Nanditha Jennifer, and Laksha as heroines. K. Bhagyaraj signed on to play an important role. J. Livingston, Muthukaalai, Singamuthu and Vadivelu David were chosen to act in supporting roles.

== Soundtrack ==
Kasu Irukkanum

Soundtrack album by Kavin Saradha and Raj Shankar
- Released: 2007
- Recorded: 2006
- Genre: Feature film soundtrack
- Length: 27:36
- Producers: Kavin Saradha; Raj Shankar

The film score and the soundtrack were composed by film composers Kavin Saradha and Raj Shankar. The soundtrack, released in 2007, features 6 tracks with lyrics written by G. R. and Asura.

Track	Song	Singer(s)	Duration
1	"Sandhaikku Pora Machan"	Haricharan, Anuradha Sriram, Mohan Ram	5:47
2	"Madura Pakkam"	Tippu, Anusha	5:00
3	"Kasu Irukkanum"	Deva	5:25
4	"Elloraiyum Vazhavaikkum"	Paththu	2:34
5	"Kathal Sammatham"	Devan Ekambaram, Anuradha Sriram	4:17
6	"Thunbatthai Kandu"	Mano	4:33

== Reception ==
A critic said that "The story is an attempt to strike a different chord from the routine fare, both by way of plotting and characterisation. But the inexperience of the makers comes in the way of building up on the knot that had potential" and also noted, "Debutant Vishwa (his home production) makes an effort at playing a role with dark shades" and labelled the film as "poor". Lajjavathi of Kalki wrote there are many things that test the patience of the fans like the complicated screenplay without a clear flow pattern and lifeless dialogues.
