= G. Ramachandran (producer) =

Indian film producer, actor, and writer (died 2021)

- Born: 1947 or 1948
- Died: 2 June 2021 (aged 73)
- Occupations: Actor, writer, producer and GR Real Estates's Managing Director (Velappanchavadi).
- Years active: 1960–2021

G. Ramachandran (1947/1948 – 2 June 2021), also known as GR, was an Indian film producer, actor and writer who worked on Tamil and Kannada films.

== Career ==
Ramachandran made his acting debut in Kalathur Kannamma (1960) as a child artiste. He featured alongside Gemini Ganesan and Savitri, and worked with fellow debutant Kamal Haasan. Ramachandran worked as actor in films including Nattupura Pattu (1996), Ettupatti Rasa (1997), Veera Thalattu (1998), Manu Needhi (2000) and Rajadhi Raja (2009).

In the early 2000s, Ramachandran worked as a film producer and funded Tamil films including Manu Needhi (2000) and Sound Party (2004) under his production banner, GR Gold Films. The production of Sound Party was delayed after actress Prathyusha, who also worked on his first film, committed suicide in February 2002. The film remained unsold and unable to gain a distributor for an extended period of time after the venture had been completed. In May 2004, he began working on his first directorial venture, Nalla Koottani, which was later dropped. He then produced Kasu Irukkanum (2007) and Enga Raasi Nalla Raasi (2009), which starred Ramachandran's son, given the stagename of Vishwa, in the lead roles.

In the 2010s, he prioritised work in the Kannada film industry and produced films such as Hendtheer Darbar (2010) and Super Shastri (2012). Ramachandran then produced Bheeshma (2016) with Kishore in the lead role. The Kannada version of the film went through production delays and a change of title, before getting a low key release. A Tamil version titled Kadhali Kanavillai was also planned but did not have a theatrical release after the censor board refused to certify it as an original Tamil film. Ramachandran later filed a complaint against censor officers Madhiyazhagan and Gangai Amaran for refusing to approve the film.

== Filmography ==
As producer

- Manu Needhi (2000)
- Sound Party (2004)
- Kasu Irukkanum (2007)
- Enga Raasi Nalla Raasi (2009)
- Hendtheer Darbar (2010)
- Super Shastri (2012)
- Bheeshma (2016)

As writer

- Kasu Irukkanum (2007)

As actor

- Kalathur Kannamma (1960)
- Solaiyamma (1994)
- Nattupura Pattu (1996)
- Ettupatti Rasa (1997)
- Veera Thalattu (1998)
- En Aasai Rasave (1998)
- Manu Needhi (2000)
- Sound Party (2004)
- Kasu Irukkanum (2007)
- Rajadhi Raja (2009)
- Hendtheer Darbar (2010)
- Super Shastri (2012)
