= Rathna (film) =

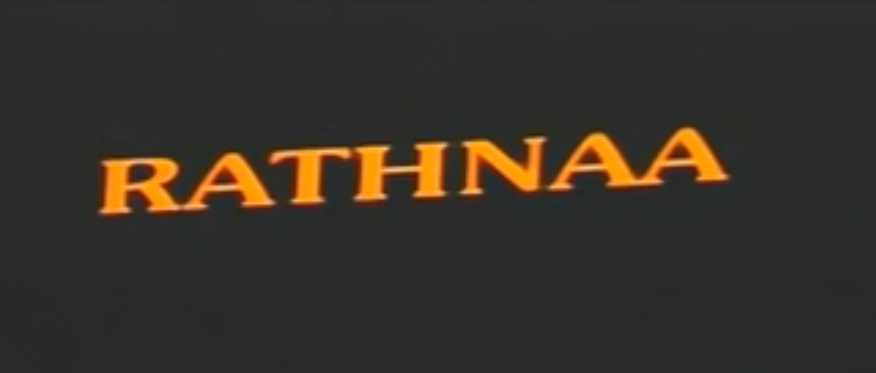
- Title card
- Directed by: Ilanchezhiyan
- Written by: Ilanchezhiyan
- Produced by: K. Pyarelal Jain
- Starring: Murali; Revathi; Sangita; Maheswari
- Cinematography: A. Krishnachander
- Edited by: V. Jaishankar
- Music by: Jayasurya
- Production company: Pinky Productions
- Release date: 7 May 1998
- Country: India
- Language: Tamil

Rathna is a 1998 Indian Tamil-language action drama film written and directed by Ilanchezhiyan. The film stars Murali in a dual role, while Sangita, Revathi and Maheswari play other supporting roles. It was released on 7 May 1998.

== Cast ==
- Murali as Muthuvelu and Rathnavelu
- Sangita as Chinthamani
- Revathi
- Maheswari as Mala
- Vadivelu as "Kathai" Kandhasamy
- Kazan Khan
- Vinu Chakravarthy
- Rajeev
- Alphonsa
- Vennira Aadai Moorthy
- Madhan Bob
- Mayilsamy
- Kumarimuthu
- Idichapuli Selvaraj
- Omakuchi Narasimhan
- Theni Kunjaramma
- Karikalan
- Supergood Kannan
- Jeeva
- Indhu
- Bayilvan Ranganathan
- A. K. Veerasamy
- K. K. Soundar
- Pasi Narayanan

== Production ==
The film featured Murali in dual roles, the third time in Tamil after Pudhiavan and Puthir.

== Soundtrack ==
Soundtrack was composed by debutant Jayasuriya.

Track listing
No.	Title	Lyrics	Singer(s)	Length
1.	"Vaadipatti"	Palani Bharathi	Swarnalatha, Shahul Hameed, Jayasuriya
2.	"Kammakarai"	Muthulingam	Dr. Karthikeyan
3.	"Vanjikodi"	Ilanchezhian	S. P. Balasubrahmanyam, K. S. Chithra
4.	"Kannil Aadum"	Palani Bharathi	Swarnalatha, Jayasuriya
5.	"Sandhana Kaathu"	Ilanchezhian	S. Janaki
6.	"Vaan Thuli"	Palani Bharathi	S. P. Balasubrahmanyam, Chithra
7.	"Maalai Veyil"	Ilanchezhian	Sindhu

== Release and reception ==
Rathna was released on 7 May 1998. Ji of Kalki felt the first half moves smoothly because the scenes ends quickly however the latter half is dragged. He praised Vadivelu's humour and Sangeetha's acting but felt Revathi was underutilised. D. S. Ramanujam of The Hindu wrote that the film's premise "has not been cogently presented by new director, K. Ilanchezhian. The main reason is that he could not fully accommodate the large cast. Seasoned artistes like Revathi suffer in the process". He added, "The old fashioned way of presenting the twins appearing together has not been improved upon by the director nor is it the fault of Murali, handling both roles with painstaking sincerity".
