= Remote (2004 film) =

- Directed by: Karvannan
- Produced by: Napoleon
- Starring: Napoleon; Anamika; Kadhir; Kalphana Shree
- Cinematography: Dharan
- Music by: Paanabhadran
- Production company: Jeevan Films
- Release date: 26 December 2004
- Country: India
- Language: Tamil

Remote is a 2004 Tamil language action thriller film directed by Karvannan, his last directorial before his death. The film featured Napoleon in the lead role, with several newcomers in supporting roles. The film was released on 26 December 2004. The impact and aftermath of the 2004 Indian Ocean earthquake and tsunami meant that the film had a brief run in theatres.

== Cast ==
- Napoleon
- Anamika
- Kadhal Sukumar
- Kadhir as Kadhir
- Kalpana Sri
- Renuka
- Vendhan
- Harris
- Jaykumar
- Nasreen
- Rajkumar
- Revali Kumar
- Bonda Mani
- Amirunnisha Gunasegaran
- Lollu Sabha Seshu
- C N A Parimalam
- V Balasubramanian
- Boys Rajan as Police Inspector

== Production ==
Since the film is set in a single location, it was shot at Thiruvangur Palace at Courtallam for 50 days. This was Karvannan's final film as director before his death in 2015.

== Soundtrack ==
Remote

Soundtrack album by Paanabhadran
- Released: 2004
- Recorded: 2004
- Genre: Feature film soundtrack

The film score and the soundtrack were composed by Paanabhadran.

Track	Song	Singer(s)	Duration
1	"Ganja Kannu"		4:21
2	"Kadhal Kondein"		4:55
3	"Suit Potta Aalu"		4:08
4	"Oraattam"		4:01

== Reception ==
Malini Mannath of Chennai Online wrote that "It's a knot with potential, ideal for a thriller. But director Karvannan, whose earlier films like Paalam, were on similar lines, lets go of the opportunity to exploit the subject this time".
