= Thondan =

Thondan may refer to:

- Thondan (1995 film), a Tamil political drama
- Thondan (2017 film), a Tamil vigilante drama
