= Thangamani Rangamani =

- Directed by: Rama Narayanan
- Written by: Rama Narayanan
- Based on: Poochakkoru Mookkuthi by Priyadarshan
- Produced by: N. Radha
- Starring: S. Ve. Shekher; Murali; Pallavi; Devisri
- Cinematography: N. K. Viswanathan
- Edited by: Rajkeerthi
- Music by: Shankar–Ganesh
- Production company: Sri Thenandal Films
- Release date: 14 April 1989
- Country: India
- Language: Tamil

Thangamani Rangamani is a 1989 Indian Tamil-language comedy film, directed by Rama Narayanan. Murali and S. Ve. Shekher star, with S. S. Chandran, Kovai Sarala, Pallavi and Devisri in supporting roles. The movie is partially adapted from the 1984 Malayalam film Poochakkoru Mookkuthi. The film was released on 14 April 1989.

== Plot ==
Thangamani and Rangamani are close friends. Rangamani, an unemployed youth, is in love with Meena, the daughter of a rich man. Thangamani is the son of a leading lawyer, who is also the legal advisor to Sivagangai Gopikrishnan, who is a successful businessman.

Rangamani wants to marry Meena and settle down in life. Rangamani lies to Meena's father that he is the son of Sivagangai Gopikrishnan and gets engaged to her. Thangamani comes across Lakshmi and falls in love with her. He misunderstands Lakshmi to be Sivagangai Gopalakrishnan's daughter. Much confusion follows and the film follows Rangamani and Thangamani's love story.

== Cast ==
- Murali as Rangamani
- S. Ve. Shekher as Thangamani
- S. S. Chandran as Sivagangai Gopikrishnan
- Pallavi as Bhagyalakshmi "Lakshmi"
- Devisri as Meena
- Vennira Aadai Moorthy as Lawyer Sivaramakrishnan, Thangamani's father
- Bayilvan Ranganathan as Govindhasamy, Meena's father
- Kovai Sarala as Lakshmi, Sivagangai Gopikrishnan's wife
- Gandhimathi as Visalakshi, Thangamani's mother
- Thyagu as a lodge owner
- Charlie as Kannayeeram, a watchman
- Kullamani as a mason
- Pakoda Kadhar as a photographer
- Perarasu as an employee in Thangamani electronics (uncredited)

== Soundtrack ==
Soundtrack was composed by Shankar–Ganesh.

All lyrics are written by Vaali.

Track listing
No.	Title	Singer(s)	Length
1.	"Va Va"	Malaysia Vasudevan, S. P. Sailaja
2.	"Sembaruthi"	S. P. Balasubrahmanyam, K. S. Chithra
3.	"Pora"	TKS Natrajan
4.	"Rail Pola"	Mano
5.	"Thangamani"	Shankar
