= Ponnana Neram =

2001 film by Ravi-Raja

- Title card
- Directed by: Ravi-Raja
- Screenplay by: Ravi-Raja
- Story by: V. Selvaraj
- Produced by: S. Rukmani
- Starring: Ramarajan; Pratyusha
- Cinematography: Dayal Osho
- Edited by: A. Joseph
- Music by: Pradeep Ravi
- Production company: Alamelu Pictures
- Release date: 30 November 2001
- Country: India
- Language: Tamil

Ponnana Neram (transl. The Golden Hour) is a 2001 Indian Tamil-language action drama film directed by the duo Ravi-Raja. The film stars Ramarajan and Prathyusha, while Shanmugasundaram and Sukumar appear in supporting roles. Featuring music composed by Pradeep Ravi, the film was released on 30 November 2001.

== Plot ==
Manivel is a police officer and Pooja is a college student, who is a prankster who often gets others into trouble. Pooja witnesses few terrorists planning to kill a minister, but nobody is ready to believe her. Whether Manivel stops the terrorist attack forms the crux of the story.

== Cast ==
- Ramarajan as A.C Manivel
- Prathyusha as Pooja
- Mansoor Ali Khan
- Alex as Pugazhendi
- Shanmugasundaram
- Gandhimathi
- Sukumar
- Omakuchi Narasimhan
- Suruli Manohar
- Bayilvan Ranganathan (uncredited)

== Soundtrack ==
The soundtrack was composed by Pradeep Ravi.

Track listing
No.	Title	Lyrics	Singer(s)	Length
1.	"Naan Ready"	Kamakodiyan	Palakkad Sreeram
2.	"Hello Hai Mamo"	Kamakodiyan	Harini, V. V. Prasanna
3.	"Kolusu Kolusu"	Kamakodiyan	Yugendran, Gopika
4.	"Thimu Thimu Roja"	Pa. Vijay	Anuradha Sriram
5.	"Machanin"	Kamakodiyan	Karma

== Reception ==
Malini Mannath of Chennai Online wrote that "Almost all of Ramarajan's roles have been that of a rustic. And one often felt that the hero should go in for a change of image. But after watching him in action as the super cop here, one feels the hero was better off playing the rustic simpleton!".
