= Raayudu =

Indian Telugu Film

- Directed by: Ravi Raja Pinisetty
- Written by: Dialogues : G Satyamoorthy
- Story by: Raj Kapoor; Ravi; Satyamoorthy
- Based on: Vallal (1997)
- Produced by: Mohan Babu
- Starring: Mohan Babu; Rachana; Prathyusha; Soundarya
- Cinematography: M. V. Raghu
- Music by: S.A. Rajkumar
- Release date: 1 July 1998
- Running time: 150 minutes
- Country: India
- Language: Telugu

Raayudu (lit. 'King') is a 1998 Telugu-language family drama film directed by Ravi Raja Pinisetty and produced by Mohan Babu. It stars Babu in the lead role along with Rachana, Prathyusha and Soundarya amongst others. A remake of the Tamil film Vallal, (Note: The source mentions that the film is a remake of a Tamil film but does not mention the film's name.) Raayudu was a box-office failure.

== Cast ==
- Mohan Babu as Raayudu
- Rachana as Lakshmi
- Soundarya as Madhavi
- Prathyusha as Rani
- Brahmanandam
- Kota Srinivasa Rao
- Nirmalamma
- Srihari
- Ambika
- Padma
- Menaka
- Chalapathi Rao
- M. S. Narayana
- Babu Mohan
- Sai Krishna
- Naveen
- Kakarala
- Yechuri
- Potti Satyam
- Pattabhi
- Jaggu
- PV Narasimha Rao
- Vijaya Lakshmi
- Sadhika
- Lakshmi Nair

== Soundtrack ==
Raayudu

Film score by S.A. Rajkumar
- Released: 1998
- Genre: Soundtrack
- Producer: S.A. Rajkumar

All music is composed by S. A. Rajkumar.

Track list
No.	Title	Lyrics	Singer(s)	Length
1.	"Jolali Jolali"	Suddala Ashok Teja	K. J. Yesudas	5:32
2.	""Sye Ante Sye Andi""	Shanmukha Sarma	S. P. Balasubrahmanyam, Sujatha	5:59
3.	"Epudo Paadindhi"	Suddala Ashok Teja	K. J. Yesudas	4:55
4.	"Oh Varudhini"	Sirivennela Seetharama Sastry	Mano, K. S. Chithra	5:02
5.	"Ela Ela Cheli"	Sirivennela Seetharama Sastry	S. P. Balasubrahmanyam, K. S. Chithra	4:47
6.	"Ammammammo Vasthunnade"	Bhuvana Chandra	Mano, K. S. Chithra	4:30
Total length:				30:47
