= Ooty (film) =

- Title card
- Directed by: Anwar
- Screenplay by: Anwar; Agasthya Bharathi; Manibharathi; Guhan Srivas; A. Zakir Hussain; T. Britto; Suryanarayanan
- Produced by: R. M. Seth; Ansar Ali
- Starring: Murali; Roja; Ajay Kapoor
- Cinematography: M. V. Panneerselvam
- Edited by: Raghu Babu
- Music by: Deva
- Production company: Nikoba Films
- Release date: 7 November 1999
- Country: India
- Language: Tamil

Ooty is a 1999 Indian Tamil-language film directed by Anwar. The film stars Murali and Roja, while Ajay Kapoor, Rajesh and Chinni Jayanth play supporting roles. It was released on 7 November 1999.

== Cast ==
- Murali as Balakumar (Balu)
- Roja as Charulatha
- Ajay Kapoor as Vasanthakumar (Kumar)
- Rajesh as Balu's uncle
- Ramji as Mohan
- Chinni Jayanth as Vivek
- Vaiyapuri as Vaiyapuri

== Production ==
The film was briefly delayed after actor Arvind Swamy filed a case against the producers, Nikaba Films, who failed to pay him for En Swasa Kaatre (1999).

== Soundtrack ==
The soundtrack was composed by Deva.

Song	Singers	Lyrics	Length
"India India"	Hariharan	Pulamaipithan	06:41
"Nee Armstrong"	Srinivas	Palani Bharathi	05:32
"O Lilly"	Sabesh, Krishnaraj	Na. Muthukumar	05:43
"O Vennila"	Anuradha Sriram	Na. Muthukumar	06:56
"Ooty Malai"	P. Unnikrishnan, Harini	Pulamaipithan	05:59

== Reception ==
Tamilmovienow wrote, "Director Anwar has created an entertaining love story with plenty of thrilling moments and twists." Chennai Online wrote, "Ooty has an interesting first half and a very slow paced second half. Murali performs the role of the despondent lover with conviction. Hasn’t he performed similar roles a hundred times before? Roja looks fetching".
