= Manikuyil =

- Poster
- Directed by: Rajavarman
- Written by: Rajavarman; A. Veerappan (dialogues)
- Produced by: R. Dhanabhalan
- Starring: Murali; Saradha Preetha
- Cinematography: G. Rajendran
- Edited by: M. Ganesan
- Music by: Ilaiyaraaja
- Production company: Yaghava Productions
- Release date: 26 February 1993
- Running time: 130 minutes
- Country: India
- Language: Tamil

Manikuyil is a 1993 Indian Tamil language romantic drama film directed by Rajavarman. The film stars Murali and Saradha Preetha, with Goundamani, Senthil, Vijayakumar, Charan Raj, Shanmugasundaram, Kokila, A. K. Veerasamy and C. R. Saraswathi playing supporting roles. It was released on 26 February 1993.

== Plot ==
Muthuvelu lives with his mother Deivanai and grandfather in a mountainous area. Despite being an educated man, he makes his living harvesting honey using traditional methods. The wicked forest officer Sundaram often gets into fights with Muthuvelu. One day, the city girl Kaveri spots Muthuvelu singing a song. She records it with her video camera and then sends the video to a TV channel. Muthuvelu's song is telecasted by the TV channel, and he becomes popular in no time; thus, he becomes a singer. Once again, Muthuvelu and Sundaram get into a fight. This time, Sundaram is suspended from his job by his superiors.

Thereafter, Muthuvelu and Kaveri fall in love with each other. At first, Kaveri's father Ramasamy accepts for their marriage. Sundaram enters their home pretending to be Muthuvelu's father. Deivanai claims that he is not her husband when Ramasamy asks about her husband's identity and she refuses to tell. Ramasamy puts his foot down when she refuses to reveal any pieces of information about Muthuvelu's father. Ramasamy is now grateful to Sundaram and appoints him to work in his factory.

Later that night, Deivanai reveals to Muthuvelu that she was an orphan and lived alone in the past. She had a secret affair with the wealthy man Ratnasabapathy, who promised to marry her. Thereafter, Deivanai received death threats from Ratnasabapathy's relatives and had no other choice but to leave the village. A kindhearted person, now Muthuvelu's grandfather, helped Deivanai and took care of her like his own daughter.

Muthuvelu goes in search of his father Ratnasabapathy and finds that he is now married and has three sons. What transpires later forms the crux of the story.

== Cast ==
- Murali as Muthuvelu
- Saradha Preetha as Kaveri
- Goundamani
- Senthil as Chinna Gounder
- Vijayakumar as Ratnasabapathy
- Charan Raj as Sundaram
- Shanmugasundaram as Ramasamy
- Kokila as Deivanai
- A. K. Veerasamy as Muthuvelu's grandfather
- C. R. Saraswathi as Ratnasabapathy's wife
- Sharmili
- Idichapuli Selvaraj
- Mottai Seetharaman
- Thayir Vadai Desikan
- Chokkalinga Bhagavathar
- Kullamani
- Kulla Appu
- Kulla Murugan
- Gundu Ganesan
- Bonda Mani
- R. K.

== Soundtrack ==
The music was composed by Ilaiyaraaja.

Song	Singer(s)	Lyrics	Duration
"Oru Nadodi"	Mano	Vaali	4:56
"Thaneerilay Mugam"	Mano, Uma Ramanan	Ponnadiyan	4:47
"Vetti Vetti Veru"	Arunmozhi	Vaali	4:39
"Adi Marrivantha"	Malaysia Vasudevan	Vaali	4:39
"Kathal Nilavey"	Arunmozhi, Uma Ramanan	Vaali	5:02
"Kathal Ennum Vetham"	Malaysia Vasudevan	Ponnadiyan	4:51

== Release and reception ==
Manikuyil was released on 26 February 1993. Malini Mannath of The Indian Express gave the film a negative review, stating, "the story lacks freshness, the screenplay is insipid and direction lack-lustre". R. P. R. of Kalki praised the cinematography as plus point but sarcastically concluded that since the story was too old, if it was considered wine, then the price would go up.
