= En Aasai Rasave =

- Theatrical release poster
- Directed by: Kasthuri Raja
- Written by: Kasthuri Raja
- Produced by: V. Natarajan
- Starring: Sivaji Ganesan; Radhika; Murali
- Cinematography: B. Kannan
- Edited by: V. Thyagarajan
- Music by: Deva
- Production company: Pyramid Films International
- Release date: 28 August 1998
- Running time: 140 minutes
- Country: India
- Language: Tamil

En Aasai Rasave is a 1998 Indian Tamil-language dance drama film directed by Kasthuri Raja. The film stars Sivaji Ganesan and Murali while Radhika, Roja and Suvalakshmi all play other supporting roles. The film, which focussed on the lives of karakattam dance artists, released on 28 August 1998.

== Plot ==
Valayapathi is a karakattam artist who is revered. Azhagurani is a well-to-do rich woman who falls in love with him and gets married leaving her riches behind. Due to a misunderstanding, they separate leaving their child Muthumani with Valayapathi who brings him up in the karakattam tradition. Manoranjitham is in love with Muthumani.

Enter Nagajyoti who claims she is the best and prods Valayapathu/Muthumani into a competition thereby gaining entry into their lives. She slowly turns the tide and Muthumani and her fall in love. It is revealed that Nagajyoti is Muthumani's cross-cousin and has come in with the ulterior motive of reuniting Azhagurani, her aunt, and Valayapathi. Does she succeed?

== Cast ==
- Sivaji Ganesan as Valayapathi
- Radhika as Azhagurani
- Murali as Muthumani
- Roja as Nagajyoti
- Vijayakumar
- Suvalakshmi as Manoranjitham
- Vinu Chakravarthy
- Senthil
- Manivannan
- Delhi Ganesh
- G. Ramachandran
- R. Sundarrajan
- Manorama
- Mahanadhi Shankar

== Production ==
To prepare for the role of a folk dancer, Ganesan invited some rural dancers to his home and watched them perform.

== Soundtrack ==
The music was composed by Deva, with lyrics by Kasthuri Raja.

Track listing
No.	Title	Singer(s)
1.	"Kattanum Kattanum"	Malaysia Vasudevan, Swarnalatha
2.	"Ennadi Nee Koottathile"	Krishnaraj, Devie Neithiyar
3.	"Pathu Rooba Ravikkai"	Arunmozhi, K. S. Chithra
4.	"Hey Panjara Kooda"	Krishnaraj, Devie Neithiyar
5.	"Munthi Munthi"	Malaysia Vasudevan, Anuradha Sriram
6.	"Sola Kaattu Pathayila"	P. Unnikrishnan, Swarnalatha
7.	"Mamarakkuyile Maamarakuyile"	S. P. Balasubrahmanyam, Swarnalatha
8.	"Therku Thesa Kaathu"	Malaysia Vasudevan
9.	"Mayangatha Mayangatha"	Malaysia Vasudevan, Devie Neithiyar

== Reception ==
D. S. Ramanujam of The Hindu wrote, "Age has withered and shackled Ganesan's virtuosity, the sparkle in his eyes and the authority in his voice that were his forte are no longer there. Whenever B. Kannan's camera takes a close-up of the veteran, it only raises visions of this great artiste in his prime in similar scenes in his earlier movies and becomes a sad reminder" Malaysia Vasudevan won the Tamil Nadu State Film Award for Best Male Playback Singer.
