= Manathile Oru Paattu =

- Directed by: Gnanamozhi
- Written by: Gnanamozhi; S. Mugilan (dialogues)
- Produced by: S. Govindaraj; P. Ravindran; P. Gnanamozhi Murugan
- Starring: Vignesh; Saradha Preetha; Sukran
- Cinematography: J. V. Suresh
- Edited by: K. Thanikachalam
- Music by: Ilayagangai
- Production company: Mozhi Movies
- Release date: 3 March 1995
- Running time: 140 minutes
- Country: India
- Language: Tamil

Manathile Oru Paattu (transl. A song in heart) is a 1995 Indian Tamil-language romantic drama film directed by Gnanamozhi in his debut. The film stars Vignesh, Saradha Preetha and Sukran, with Raghuvaran, Vinu Chakravarthy, Vennira Aadai Moorthy, Chinni Jayanth and Sangeeta playing supporting roles. It was released on 3 March 1995.

== Plot ==
Anand is a college student living with his friend Akbar in a small lodge, Anand doesn't have family and he has to take a part-time job to finance his studies. At the beginning of the college year, he meets Jyothi and Sukran. Jyothi is from a rich family, she lives with her mother and maternal uncle Ashok while Sukran is a disruptive student. Sukran spends time eve teasing the college girls with his friends during the day, and drank alcohol at the local bar the night. Soon, Anand and Jyothi become good friends, they slowly fall in love with each other but they are unable to reveal their love. Sukran is in love with Jyothi too. One day, Jyothi helps Anand to pay his college fees. Being jealous of their friendship, Sukran starts to get into a fight with Anand at the college. Jyothi stops their fight and she claims that she is in love with Anand. Sukran then informs Jyothi's family that Jyothi is in love with her college mate Anand. Her family refuses to let her go to college and locks her inside her room. Her uncle decides to marry her and her mother advises Jyothi to forget Anand.

In the past, when Jyothi was studying in Ooty, Jyothi's sister Gayathri and the poor man Raja fell in love with each other. Jyothi's father Rajadurai was hell bent to save his family's prestige at any cost, so he sent henchmen to beat up Raja. James intervened and saved Raja from the henchmen. James then pleaded Rajadurai to accept for their marriage but Rajadurai refused. James was later killed by Rajadurai's henchmen, whereas Gayathri and Raja were brutally murdered by Rajadurai, therefore Rajadurai was sent to jail.

Anand is determined to marry Jyothi. His college mates including Sukran decide to help the lovers. What transpires next forms the rest of the story.

== Cast ==
- Vignesh as Anand
- Saradha Preetha as Jyothi
- Sukran as Sukran
- Raghuvaran as James (guest appearance)
- Vinu Chakravarthy as Rajadurai (guest appearance)
- Vennira Aadai Moorthy as Professor of Psychology
- Chinni Jayanth as Chinni
- Sangeeta as Jyothi's mother
- Mayilsamy as Mayilu
- Ennatha Kannaiya
- Asha
- Sujatha
- Kumaresan
- Rajesh
- Viswanath
- Vijay
- Gemini Sridhar
- Erode Suresh
- Venkatesh
- Pazhani
- Peter Hein as student

== Soundtrack ==
The soundtrack was composed by Ilayagangai, with lyrics written by Kalaivanan Kannadasan, Sembaiah and Manimudi and the director Gnanamozhi.

Song	Singer(s)	Duration
"Azhagiya Poonkuruvie"	Mohandas, Uma Ramanan	5:01
"College Pogum Ponne"	Mano, Sudharsan	4:23
"Kanne Azhagiya"	S. P. Balasubrahmanyam, K. S. Chithra	4:47
"Manathil Oru Paattu"	S. P. Balasubrahmanyam	4:50
"Oru Kaadhal Raagam"	S. P. Balasubrahmanyam, Minmini	4:26
