= Thiruttu VCD =

2015 Indian film by Kadhal Sukumar

- Directed by: Kadhal Sukumar
- Produced by: Prabha
- Starring: Prabha; Sakshi Agarwal; Kadhal Sukumar
- Cinematography: Jagadish
- Music by: Jithin Roshan
- Production company: VPA Medias
- Distributed by: The Vibrant Movies
- Release date: 24 September 2015
- Country: India
- Language: Tamil

Thiruttu VCD (transl. Pirated VCD) is a 2015 Indian Tamil-language comedy film written and directed by Kadhal Sukumar. The film stars the producer, Prabha, and Sakshi Agarwal in the lead roles, with Devadarshini in a supporting role. The film was theatrically released in India on 24 September 2015.

== Cast ==
- Prabha as Vinod
- Sakshi Agarwal as Sakshi
- Kadhal Sukumar as Chinna
- Mano as Dilli
- Devadarshini
- Vichu Vishwanath
- Senthil
- Nellai Siva as Traffic Police Inspector

== Production ==
Comedian Kadhal Sukumar began his career as a director in late 2012 through the production of Thirukkural, but the film was later shelved after a few schedules. His first release was consequently Thiruttu VCD featuring himself in a key role. The film began production in 2014 and a press meet was held in September 2014. The film is named after the three lead characters — who are portrayed by producer Prabha (Vinod), director Kadhal Sukumar (Chinna) and Mano (Dilli). Actress Sakshi Agarwal was supposed to make her Tamil film debut as a lead actress through the project, but production delays meant that her other films released first.

== Release ==
The film subsequently had a low key release on 24 September 2015 and went unnoticed at the box office. A reviewer from The New Indian Express gave the film a negative review, adding "unfortunately neither the action works nor the humour". In contrast, a reviewer from the Tamil film portal IFlicks stated "though, the plot seems to be simple, the lead artists have performed realistically and the screenplay is commendable". The film did not perform well commercially.
