= Seethakoka Chiluka =

- Film poster
- Directed by: A. R. Rajaraja
- Written by: A. R. Rajaraja
- Produced by: C. K. Rao
- Starring: Navdeep; Sheela Kaur
- Cinematography: A. Selva
- Edited by: Raja Mohammad
- Music by: Mani Sharma
- Production company: Sri Raja Rajeswari Combines
- Release date: 29 September 2006
- Country: India
- Language: Telugu

Seethakoka Chiluka is a 2006 Indian Telugu-language film directed by A. R. Rajaraja. Navdeep and Sheela Kaur play the lead roles. Adolescent dreams and desires form its theme. The film was dubbed in Tamil as Ilavattam with a few reshot scenes.

== Plot ==
The movie begins in college, with the district collector awarding Srinivas alias Cheenu and asking him to share his success story with everybody. Cheenu is an honest and studious village guy who hails from a poor farmer's family. Despite his friends' attempts to sway him towards the lusty distractions of adolescence, he stands his ground and tries to persuade them to follow his path. Lakshmi is the second daughter of a Zamindar also from the same village who studies at the same college as Cheenu. Despite their hatred for each other at the beginning, they end up falling for each other after a lot of melodrama. Lakshmi's brother-in-law (her elder sister's husband) lusts for her and tries to inherit their fortune by marrying both the Zamindar's daughters. He tries to beat Cheenu to death when everybody finds about their love affair. In an attempt to escape Prithviraj, the couple seeks protection from the district collector, who assures them that she would help them marry each other after they finish their education. The movie ends with a tedious action episode between Cheenu and Prithviraj and the title rolls.

== Cast ==
- Navdeep as Srinivas
- Sheela as Lakshmi
- Suhasini as District Collector
- Vijayakumar as Lakshmi's father
- Ali
- Manorama
- Sangeeta
- Subhalekha Sudhakar
- Babloo Prithiveeraj
- Dharmavarapu Subramanyam
- Surekha Vani
- Krishna Bhagawan as Professor
- Venu Yeldandi
- Prudhvi Raj
- Bhuvaneswari
- Kadhal Sukumar

== Production ==
The film marked the directorial debut of A. R. Rajaraja who works as dialogue writer for Tamil dubbed films.

== Soundtrack ==
Soundtrack was composed by Mani Sharma.

Telugu version

- Chooputhoti - Mallikarjun, Saindhavi
- Kannulu Kannulu - Jayadev, Sunitha
- Kassuna Leche - Tippu, Reshmi
- Ee Yevvanama - Ranjith
- O Guruva - Murali, Srivardhini

Tamil version

- Kadhara - Krishnachandran, Uma Ramanan
- Kenjinaka - Mallikarjun, Saindhavi
- Om Muruga - Karthik, Srivardhini
- Yaar Kadavule - Ranjith
- Yuddham - Tippu, Reshmi

== Reception ==
Reviewing Tamil version, Chennai Online wrote "The message for the younger generation is to have a focus in life and work towards it. The idea has been fairly neatly weaved in. But the situations are oft-told ones, and are narrated in a manner that was done a decade or more ago". Lajjavathi of Kalki felt the film would have been a good lesson for the youth if the screenplay had been made stronger. Cinesouth wrote "Having gone overboard in his story and screenplay, director AR Rajaraja might as well as titled 'Ilavattam' as 'Kaattam'".
