= Manju Virattu (film) =

- Directed by: L. S. Valaiyapathy
- Written by: L. S. Valaiyapathy
- Produced by: N. Anbazhagan
- Starring: Murali; Mohana
- Cinematography: K. B. Ahmed
- Edited by: K. B. Harikrishnan
- Music by: Deva
- Production company: Thennagam Creations
- Release date: 9 December 1994
- Running time: 150 minutes
- Country: India
- Language: Tamil

Manju Virattu (transl. Bull chasing) is a 1994 Indian Tamil-language romantic drama film written and directed by L. S. Valaiyapathy. The film stars Murali and Mohana. It was released on 9 December 1994.

== Plot ==
Pandi (Murali) and Poovazhagi (Mohana) hate each other since their childhood. According to their custom, Poovazhagi must marry the brave Pandi or the womaniser Dhanraj (Vasu Vikram). The hatred between Pandi and Poovazhagi increases, creating troubles between their respective families. What transpires later forms the crux of the story.

== Cast ==
- Murali as Pandian
- Mohana as Poovazhagi
- Janagaraj as Gnanam
- Vasu Vikram as Dhanraj
- Shanmugasundaram as Sethupathi, Pandian's father
- Srividya as Meenakshi, Pandian's mother
- Nambirajan as Sakthivel, Poovazhagi's father
- Janaki as Rukmani, Poovazhagi's mother
- Sabitha Anand as Chellamma
- S. N. Lakshmi
- Chitraguptan
- Master Vijayakumar as Pandian (child)
- Monica as Poovazhagi (child)

== Soundtrack ==
The soundtrack was composed by Deva, with lyrics written by Vaali.

Song	Singer(s)	Duration
"Kannu Padum"	Rajagopal, Sindhu	5:21
"Mamma Unn Perai"	S. P. Balasubrahmanyam, K. S. Chithra	4:39
"Mama Vaangi Thantha"	S. Janaki	4:59
"Petta Kozhi Onnu"	Mano	4:31
"Uchiele Manju Thani"	Sindhu	4:15
