= Kadhal Sukumar =

Indian actor and film director

- Occupations: Actor, director
- Years active: 1997-present

Kadhal Sukumar is an Indian actor and director who has appeared in Tamil language films as a comedian notably in Balaji Sakthivel's romantic film Kaadhal (2004).

== Career ==
Sukumar, the son of a farmer from Alanganallur near Madurai, came to Chennai in 1997, searching for an opportunity to star in Tamil films. His first on screen appearance was in Sakthi (1997), where he featured as a dancer alongside Vadivelu in a song, with several critics remarking about his resemblance to the actor. Sukumar then first worked as an actor in Kasthuri Raja's unreleased film Kaadhal Jaathi, before working on a television show titled Oorvambu on Raj TV, which garnered attention for him in the film industry. Sukumar received a breakthrough after featuring as Bharath's friend in Balaji Sakthivel's coming-of-age, love story Kaadhal (2004). The success of the film prompted the actor to place the film's title as a prefix to his name. In the same year, he worked on two films starring Kamal Haasan - the village drama Virumaandi and the comedy Vasool Raja MBBS.

In 2008, Sukumar received an opportunity to play the leading role in a film titled Saamipulla opposite actresses Karthika and Saranya Mohan. Despite a launch event, the film failed to progress and was consequently shelved.

Sukumar began his career as a director in late 2012 through the production of Thirukkural, but the film was later shelved after a few schedules. His first release was consequently Thiruttu VCD (2015) featuring himself in a key role. The film had a low key release and did not perform well commercially. Sukumar next made Summave Aaduvom (2016), focusing on street artistes, starring athlete Arun Balaji and Leema Babu. The film opened to positive reviews, with a critic from The New Indian Express stating "after his disastrous directorial debut in Thiruttu VCD, Summave Aaduvom comes as a redemption of sorts for the actor-turned-maker".

== Filmography ==
=== As director ===
Year	Film	Notes
2015	Thiruttu VCD	
2016	Summave Aaduvom	

=== As an actor ===
==== Tamil ====
- Sakthi (1997)
- Kalakalappu (2001)
- Ponnana Neram (2001)
- Thrill (2002)
- Five Star (2002)
- Virumaandi (2004)
- Vasool Raja MBBS (2004)
- Kaadhal (2004)
- Remote (2004)
- Aadhikkam (2005)
- Karpanai (2005)
- Oru Naal Oru Kanavu (2005)
- Manthiran (2005)
- Ilakkanam (2006)
- Ilavattam (2006)
- Yuga (2006)
- Mann (2006)
- Kasu Irukkanum (2007)
- Thullal (2007)
- Thee Nagar (2007)
- Arai En 305-il Kadavul (2008)
- Velvi (2008)
- Iru Nadhigal (2009)
- Nesi (2009)
- Oru Kadhalan Oru Kadhali (2009)
- Suriyan Satta Kalloori (2009)
- Bayam Ariyaan (2010)
- Kumari Pennin Ullathile (2010)
- Neethana Avan (2010)
- Puzhal (2010)
- Unakkaga Oru Kavithai (2010)
- Thenmerku Paruvakaatru (2010)
- Minsaram (2011)
- Naan Sivanagiren (2011)
- Idhayam Thiraiarangam (2012)
- Suzhal (2012)
- Muthu Nagaram (2013)
- Naankam Thamizhan (2013)
- Ninaivil Nindraval (2014)
- Angusam (2014)
- Kalai Vendhan (2015)
- Thiruttu VCD (2015)
- En Aaloda Seruppa Kaanom (2017)
- Manushanaa Nee (2018)
- Sandimuni (2020)
- Thiruvalar Panchankam (2020)
- Sariya Thavara (2021)
- Thanne Vandi (2021)
- Aruvaa Sanda (2022)
- Star (2024)
- Dappankuthu (2024)
- Otha Votu Muthaiya (2025)
- Paramasivan Fathima (2025)
- Desingu Raja 2 (2025)
- Police Family (2026)

==== Telugu ====
- Seethakoka Chiluka (2006)
- Neeku Naaku (2006)
- Mallepuvvu (2008)
- Sweet Heart (2009)
