= Chinna Pasanga Naanga =

- Directed by: Raj Kapoor
- Written by: Raj Kapoor
- Produced by: A. G. Subramaniam
- Starring: Murali; Revathi; Saradha Preetha
- Cinematography: R. Raghunatha Reddy
- Edited by: B. Lenin; V. T. Vijayan
- Music by: Ilaiyaraaja
- Production company: AGS Movies
- Release date: 1 May 1992
- Running time: 150 minutes
- Country: India
- Language: Tamil

Chinna Pasanga Naanga (transl. We are small boys) is a 1992 Indian Tamil-language film directed by Raj Kapoor. The film stars Murali, Revathi and Saradha Preetha. It was released on 1 May 1992.

== Plot ==
Muthukaalai, an angry young man, returns to his village after studying in the city. Ambalam is a respected panchayat headman since his brother married a woman from another caste, he hates their family. Poochandu, Ambalam's niece, falls in love with Muthukaalai. Meanwhile, Muthukaalai's cousin Marikolunthu who is crazy about Muthukaalai comes from her village to marry him. One day, the storm devastates the entire village, destroying the poor villagers' house. The villagers beg Ambalam to let them in the temple until the storm calms down but Ambalam refuses. Poochandu's mother breaks the temple's padlock to save the villagers. The next day, at the village panchayat, Ambalam condemn Poochandu's mother to tonsure and Poochandu to become a Devadasi. In anger against this dictatorship, Muthukaalai ridicules Ambalam and he marries Poochandu. What transpires next forms the rest of the story.

== Cast ==
- Murali as Muthukaalai
- Revathi as Marikolunthu
- Saradha Preetha as Poochandu
- R. P. Vishwam as Ambalam
- Goundamani as 'Kuwait' Govind
- Senthil as Theanappan
- Vadivukkarasi
- Sangeetha
- Charle as Manikkam
- Kumarimuthu as Kannayiram
- K. K. Soundar as Kaalimuthu
- Kovai Senthil as Vellaisamy
- Super Subbarayan
- Master Haja Sheriff
- King Kong
- Vaani
- Sivaram Gandhi
- Boopathi Raja
- Venkatesh
- Sivaraman
- Marthandan
- Chelladurai

== Production ==
The film was produced by A. G. Subramaniam, a congress leader. Initially Director Vasanth had to direct the film. But some unknown reasons, he left the project. Later Ilaiyaraaja got impressed by Thalattu Ketkuthamma while composing background music, he recommended Subramaniam to do a film with Raj Kapoor which became Chinna Pasanga Naanga.

== Soundtrack ==
The music was composed by Ilaiyaraaja. The song "Enna Maanamulla Ponnu" became highly popular.

| Song | Singer(s) | Lyrics | Duration |
|---|---|---|---|
| "Enna Maanamulla Ponnu" | S. Janaki | Gangai Amaran | 4:58 |
| "Ingey Maanamulla Ponnu" | S. P. Balasubrahmanyam | Gangai Amaran | 4:46 |
| "Jodi Nalla Jodi Ithu" | Malaysia Vasudevan, K. S. Chithra | Gangai Amaran | 4:57 |
| "Kovanatha Irukki Kattu" | Mano | Vaali | 5:16 |
| "Mayilaadum Thoppil" | S. P. Balasubrahmanyam, S. Janaki | Vaali | 4:57 |
| "Velakku Vacha" | Malaysia Vasudevan | Gangai Amaran | 4:57 |

== Reception ==
C. R. K. of Kalki felt looking at the title it is clear its a film set in village and is no different from earlier village centric films. The film completed a 100-day run at the box-office.
