= Super Shastri =

- Promotional poster
- Directed by: Raviraj
- Written by: Raviraj
- Based on: Seema Sastri (Telugu) by G. Nageswara Reddy
- Produced by: G. Ramachandran
- Starring: Prajwal Devraj; Haripriya
- Cinematography: Kashi Vishwanath
- Music by: Deva
- Production company: G. R. Gold films
- Release date: 9 November 2012
- Country: India
- Language: Kannada

Super Shastri is a 2012 Indian Kannada-language action comedy film directed by Raviraj and produced by G. Ramachandran. It stars Prajwal Devraj and Haripriya in the lead roles. The film is a remake of the 2007 Telugu comedy film Seema Sastri starring Allari Naresh and Farzana. Rangayana Raghu, Umashree, Bullet Prakash and Rekha Kumar among others play the supporting roles. Deva is the score and soundtrack composer.

== Cast ==
- Prajwal Devraj as Subramanya Sastry
- Haripriya as Soumya Gowda
- Umashree
- Rangayana Raghu
- Bullet Prakash
- Pallakki Radhakrishna as Venkatappa Gowda
- Ambika Soni
- Master Manju
- Master Suresh
- Rekha Kumar
- Kote Prabhakar
- Suresh Wadageri

== Soundtrack ==
The soundtrack is composed by Deva to the lyrics of K. Kalyan.

No.	Title	Singer(s)	Length
1.	"Ardha KG"	Prasanna
2.	"Manase Baalangochi"	Prasanna
3.	"Onde Ondu"	Badri Prasad, Nanditha Gururaj
4.	"Puneeth Rajkumar"	Badri Prasad, Chaitra H. G.
5.	"Vishwa Sundari"	Prasanna

== Reception ==
A critic from The Times of India scored the film at 2.5 out of 5 stars and says "Though Prajwal has done a good job, he does not fit the role. Haripriya impresses with her glamorous look. Pallakki Radhakrishna has done a good job as villain. Less said the better about the rest". Srikanth Srinivasa from Rediff.com scored the film at 1 out of 5 stars and wrote "Kashi Vishwanath's camera work is shoddy. Deva's music is nothing much to write about. Director Ravi Raj has neither understood the language nor has he got a grip on the narrative. The film manages to raise barely a few laughs. It lacks comic timing and punchy dialogues. It is better to stay clear from this intolerable film". Y Maheswara Reddy from DNA wrote "Her dialogue delivery deserves appreciation in particular. Saving grace comes only in the form of Deva’s music. Don’t think too much before giving this film a miss, is our final verdict!". A critic from Bangalore Mirror wrote "Prajwal looks good and varies his voice for the two different getups well. He has matured, but unfortunately his films have not. He better choose his future films well. Along with Haripriya, he makes a good pair on the screen. What is lacking are good film makers to tap such potential".
