= Saradha Preetha =

Indian actress

- Occupation: Film actor
- Years active: 1980-1998

Saradha Preetha is an Indian actress in Tamil and Malayalam movies. She was one of the prominent lead and supporting actresses in Malayalam and Tamil movies during 1990s. She came into movie industry as a child artist and later started doing lead roles and supporting roles.

== Filmography ==
Year	Film	Role	Language	Notes
1980	Rishi Moolam	Baby Ashok	Tamil	child artist
1981	Rusi Kanda Poonai		Tamil	child artist
1982	Olangal		Malayalam	child artist
1983	Kattathe Kilikkoodu	Yamuna	Malayalam	child artist
1985	Yathra	Ammini	Malayalam	child artist
1985	Ozhivukalam	Girl performing Sarpam Thullal	Malayalam	child artist
1980	Oonjaladum Uravugal		Tamil	child artist
1986	Chilambu		Malayalam	child artist
1986	Aayiram Pookkal Malarattum	Preetha	Tamil	child artist
1991	En Rasavin Manasile	Kasthuri	Tamil	
1991	Pavunnu Pavunuthan	Soodamani	Tamil	
1992	Chinna Pasanga Naanga	Poochandu	Tamil	
1992	Government Mappillai	Kalyani	Tamil	
1993	Konjum Kili	Sisily Issac	Tamil	
1993	Manikuyil	Kaveri	Tamil	
1993	Sarigamalu	Geetha	Telugu	
1994	Gamanam	Rosie	Malayalam	
1994	Pudhupatti Ponnuthaayi	Saroja	Tamil	
1994	Nandini Oppol	Sundari	Malayalam	
1994	Sundara Vadana Subbalakshmi Moguda	Durga	Telugu	
1995	Kusruthikaatu	Reshma	Malayalam	
1995	Manathile Oru Paattu	Jyothi	Tamil	
1997	Surya Vamsam	Sakthivel Daughter	Tamil	Uncredited Role
1997	Siamese Irattakal	Dr.Sophy/Nancy Ninan Koshy	Malayalam	
1997	Ranger	Rekha	Malayalam	
1998	Kondattam	Saradha	Tamil	

== TV serials ==
- Visirikku Verkirathu (DD Chennai, 1991)
- Thirisooli
- Dhik Dhik Dhik
