= Karvannan =

- Occupation: Director
- Years active: 1990-2004

Karvannan (died 13 February 2015) was an Indian film director, producer and screenwriter who worked on Tamil films.

== Career ==
Karvannan associated three times with actor Murali, during his five film career, working on Paalam (1990), Pudhiya Katru (1990) and Thondan (1995). After a break in the late 1990s, he returned to make another feature film titled Remote (2004) with Napolean in the lead role. The impact and aftermath of the 2004 Indian Ocean earthquake and tsunami meant that the film had a brief run in theatres.

Karvannan died in February 2015, aged 55, following a heart attack.

== Filmography ==
Year	Film	Notes
1990	Paalam	
1990	Pudhiya Kaatru	
1992	Moondrampadi	
1995	Thondan	
2004	Remote	
