= Dappankuthu (film) =

Indian musical film

- Theatrical release poster
- Directed by: R. Muthu Veera
- Written by: S. T. Guna Sekaran
- Produced by: Jeganathan Sivasubramanian
- Starring: Sankara Pandian; Dheepthi Raj; Kadhal Sukumar
- Cinematography: Raja K. Bakthavachalam
- Edited by: D. S. Lakshmanan
- Music by: L. K. Saravanan
- Production company: Modern Digitech Media LLP
- Distributed by: Action Reaction
- Release date: 6 December 2024
- Country: India
- Language: Tamil

Dappankuthu is a 2024 Indian Tamil-language musical film written and directed by R.Muthu veera. The film stars Sankara Pandian and Dheepthi Raj. The film was produced by Jeganathan Sivasubramanian under the banner of Modern Digitech Media LLP.

== Cast ==
- Sankara Pandian as Pandi
- Dheepthi Raj as Dhanam
- Kadhal Sukumar as Sankaran Koil Sakku
- Andrews as Dharmalingam

== Production ==
The film was produced by Jeganathan Sivasubramanian under the banner of Modern Digitech Media LLP. The cinematography was done by Raja K.Bakthavachalam while editing was handled by D.S.Lakshmanan and music composed by L.K.Saravanan.

== Reception ==
A critic from Thinaboomi wrote, "overall, Dappankuthu has brought glory to the street art." A Dinakaran critic stated, "The song sequence focusing on 45 rivers is special." A critic from Maalai Malar rated the film three out of five stars and wrote, "expressing the story of the film through songs is a new effort."
