= Enga Raasi Nalla Raasi =

- Directed by: Ravi-Raja
- Screenplay by: Ravi-Raja
- Story by: Janardhana Maharshi
- Produced by: R. P. Poorani
- Starring: Murali; Vishwa; Reethima; S. V. Shekhar
- Cinematography: Dhayal Osho
- Edited by: A. Joseph
- Music by: Deva
- Production company: G. R. Gold Films
- Release date: 24 April 2009
- Running time: 140 minutes
- Country: India
- Language: Tamil

Enga Rasi Nalla Rasi (transl. Our zodiac is a good zodiac) is a 2009 Indian Tamil language comedy film, by the duo Ravi-Raja and produced by R. P. Poorani. The film stars Murali, Vishwa, Reethima and S. V. Shekhar. The film was a remake of Telugu film Oka Radha Iddaru Krishnula Pelli (2003). Enga Rasi Nalla Rasi opened to negative reviews.

== Cast ==
- Murali as Vijay
- Vishwa as Vishwa
- Reethima as Aishwarya / Malathi
- S. V. Shekhar as Sivashankar
- G. Ramachandran as Vijay's father
- Livingston as Pandian
- Charle as Bala
- Chinni Jayanth as Bala's father
- Vineetha as Chandramukhi
- Jaya Rekha
- Kanaga Priya
- Bayilvan Ranganathan
- Suruli Manohar
- Chelladurai
- Mohan Raman as Police inspector
- Abhinayashree as Special appearance

== Production ==
The film marked the debut of producer K Srinivasan's son Vishwa. The film marked the comeback of veteran actress Vineetha.

== Soundtrack ==
The music is composed by Deva. Director Kasthuri Raja, producer Sivasakthi Pandian, Sathyaraj, Khushbu and K. Rajan attended the film's audio launch. Regarding the songs played at the audio launch, they failed to strike a chord with the audience.

Title	Singer(s)	Lyrics	Length
"Entha Varusam"	Senthildass Velayutham, Renuka	Muthumagan	04:25
"Nee Ethukku"	Ashrith, Malathy Lakshman	Ponniyin Selvan	04:26
"Vaaya Vaaya"	Prasanna, Suchitra	Piraisoodan	04:29
"Vairamuthu Varikalil"	Prasanna, Kalyani Nair	Karunanidhi	04:27
"Vairamuthu Varikalil" II	Prasanna, Kalyani Nair	Karunanidhi	04:25
