= Hendtheer Darbar =

- VCD cover
- Directed by: V. Sekhar
- Written by: V. Sekhar; Mohan Shankar (dialogue)
- Based on: Varavu Ettana Selavu Pathana
- Produced by: G. Ramachandran
- Starring: Ramesh Aravind; Meena
- Cinematography: Raju Mahendran
- Edited by: Jo Ni Harsha
- Music by: Sadhu Kokila
- Production company: G R Gold Films
- Release date: 29 June 2010
- Running time: 159 minutes
- Country: India
- Language: Kannada

Hendtheer Darbar is a 2010 Indian Kannada language comedy-drama film written and directed by V. Sekhar and produced by G. Ramachandran. The film stars Ramesh Aravind and Meena along with Rangayana Raghu and Sadhu Kokila in pivotal roles. The film is a remake of Sekhar's own Tamil film Varavu Ettana Selavu Pathana released 16 years ago in 1994.

The film released on 29 June 2010 across Karnataka. The film was a sleeper hit at the box-office with the collections picking up slowly after the release.

== Cast ==
- Ramesh Aravind as Shivaramu
- Meena as Radha
- Rangayana Raghu
- Sadhu Kokila
- Ambika Soni
- G. Ramachandran
- Anantha Velu
- Layendra
- Preethi

== Soundtrack ==
Hendtheer Darbar

Soundtrack album by Sadhu Kokila
- Genre: Film soundtrack
- Label: Manoranjan Audio

All lyrics are written by V. Nagendra Prasad, Tushar Ranganath and Ram Narayan; all music is composed by Sadhu Kokila.

Track listing
No.	Title	Singer(s)	Length
1.	"Bele Bele"	Anoop Seelin
2.	"Muddata Oddata"	Shamitha Malnad
3.	"Devathe Devathe"	Achal Khan, Nanditha
4.	"Barlaa Maga"	Hemanth Kumar
5.	"Are Nodu Hendtheera Darbar"	Hemanth Kumar, Sadhu Kokila, Shamitha Malnad, Usha

== Reception ==
=== Critical response ===
A critic from The Times of India scored the film at 2.5 out of 5 stars and says "Ramesh delivers a brilliant performance, shining in the dishum dishum sequences too, while Meena is simply superb. The role of the MLA (GR) with a Tamil accent in indigestible. Rangayana Raghu impresses. Music by Sadhu Kokila and camera by Raju Mahendra are average". BSS from Deccan Herald wrote "The first half of “Hendthir...” impresses with a tight screenplay and, some believable dialogues by S Mohan with little in terms of vulgarity. It is in the second half, however, that the film slips".
