= En Aasai Machan =

- Theatrical release poster
- Directed by: R. Sundarrajan
- Written by: R. Sundarrajan
- Produced by: Tamil Fathima
- Starring: Vijayakanth; Murali; Revathi; Ranjitha
- Cinematography: Rajarajan
- Edited by: G. Jayachandran
- Music by: Deva
- Production company: Tamilannai Cine Creation
- Release date: 26 August 1994
- Running time: 150 minutes
- Country: India
- Language: Tamil

En Aasai Machan (transl. My dear fiancé) is a 1994 Indian Tamil-language drama film written and directed by R. Sundarrajan. The film stars Vijayakanth, Murali, Revathi and Ranjitha. It was released on 26 August 1994.

== Plot ==
Subramani, a college leader, falls in love with Meenakshi, but she requests him to complete her challenges to accept his love. Subramani succeeds in her challenges, and when she asks him to kiss her in public, he is arrested by a police officer. Aarusamy, Subramani's brother, a respected village chief, lives with Thayamma. In the past, Subramani's mother died during Subramani's childbirth. Aarusamy and Thayamma got engaged when they were children. They stayed unmarried to take care of Subramani.

Subramani is later released from jail. Meenakshi's uncle Thangarasu wants to marry her, and he then beats up Aarusamy. Later, Thayamma decides to work in Meenakshi's house to spy on her. Meenakshi admits to Thayamma that she is in love with Subramani. Thangarasu agrees with Meenakshi and Subramani's marriage. Finally, Subramani and Meenakshi get married, but they discover that Thayamma has died.

It is revealed that on the day before, Thangarasu humiliated Aarusamy to take revenge, and Aarusamy accepted it for his brother's marriage. Unable to bear this torture, Thayamma dies watching him. The film ends with Aarusamy marrying Thayamma before carrying her dead body off to perform her last rites.

== Cast ==
- Vijayakanth as Aarusamy
- Murali as Subramani
- Revathi as Thayamma (Maragadham)
- Monica as Younger Thayamma
- Ranjitha as Meenakshi
- Kazan Khan as Thangarasu, Meenakshi's uncle
- Gandhimathi as Kaveri
- Radha Ravi as Police Officer
- R. Sundarrajan
- Thalapathy Dinesh as Dinesh
- Balu Anand as Nachimuthu
- Kovai Senthil
- Nellai Siva
- Selladurai
- Kokila

== Soundtrack ==
The music was composed by Deva.

Track listing
No.	Title	Lyrics	Singer(s)	Length
1.	"Aadiyile Sedhi"	Kalidasan	K. S. Chithra	4:57
2.	"Karuppu Nila"	Vaali	K. S. Chithra	5:15
3.	"Raasithan Kai Raasithan"	Vaali	S. P. Balasubrahmanyam, K. S. Chithra	5:04
4.	"Soru Kondu Pora"	Gangai Amaran	S. P. Balasubrahmanyam, K. S. Chithra	3:51
5.	"Thalaivanai Azhaikuthu"	Kalidasan	S. Janaki	4:38
6.	"Then Madurai"	Kalidasan	S. P. Balasubrahmanyam	4:10
7.	"Valai Virikkiran"	Kalidasan	S. P. Balasubrahmanyam, K. S. Chithra	4:51

== Reception ==
K. Vijiyan of New Straits Times wrote that while the film had a promising start, it "ends up being disappointing". Thulasi of Kalki said this film is for those who like emotional films. Revathi won the Cinema Express Award for Best Actress – Tamil, and Monica won the Tamil Nadu State Film Award for Best Child Artist.
