= Prathyusha =

Indian actress (1981-2002)

- Born: 29 August 1981; Bhongir, Telangana, India
- Died: 23 February 2002 (aged 20); Hyderabad, Telangana, India
- Occupation: Actress
- Years active: 1998–2002
- Website: prathyusha.org

Prathyusha (29 August 1981 – 23 February 2002) was an Indian actress who appeared in Telugu and Tamil language films. She debuted in 1998 and acted in 12 films in 4 years in three languages. Her last release was in 2004.

== Early life and film career ==
Pratyusha was born in Bhuvanagiri of present-day Telangana into a middle-class family. Her mother, Mrs. Sarojini Devi, is a government school teacher. Her brother is Praneet Chandra (also known as Krishna Chandra).

Pratyusha was schooled at Santosh Vidhya Niketan, Bhuvanagiri, Prakash Public School, Miryalaguda and later at St. Anns High School, Tarnaka, Hyderabad.

Pratyusha completed her intermediate from Gouthami Residential Academy, S.R.Nagar and graduation in Bachelor of Hotel Management at Banjara Hills and JB Institute of Hotel Management.

Pratyusha participated in Television Star 2000 Contest and was crowned Ms. Lovely Smile. Her success in the contest paved way to enter the film world. She had signed for a Kannada film before she died. Her Telugu film Idemi Oorura Babu was also not released.

Pratyusha's final release was the 2004 Tamil language movie Sound Party, for which she received positive reviews.

== Death ==
Prathyusha died on 22 February 2002 after allegedly attempting suicide by consuming poison along with her friend Siddharth, reportedly because their marriage proposal was rejected by family members. Some reports suggest it was a murder. Pratyusha died while undergoing treatment at Care Hospital, while Siddartha recovered. The case was widely discussed in the media and attracted public attention as some leaders of then ruling party were involved in this case. the suspicion of murder arose on Siddhartha, and after a forensic expert opined that the cause of her death was 'asphyxia due to manual strangulation'. The report was referred to Professor T D Dogra, an eminent forensic expert and Head of Forensic Division, at All India Institute of Medical Sciences New Delhi. The doctor's report was then found to be faulty. In 2004, Siddhartha was sentenced to five years' imprisonment and to pay a fine of ₹6,000 as he was found guilty of attempting suicide and abetting Pratyusha's suicide.

After her death, her mother started a charity in her name.

== Filmography ==
Year	Film	Role	Language	Notes
1998	Raayudu	Rani	Telugu	Telugu debut
1998	Sri Ramulayya	Mutyaalu	Telugu	
1999	Samudram	Chanti	Telugu	
2000	Manu Needhi	Poongodi	Tamil	Tamil Debut
2001	Super Kudumbam	Abirami	Tamil	
2001	Snehamante Idera	Amrita	Telugu	
2001	Ponnana Neram	Pooja	Tamil	
2001	Thavasi	Nandhini	Tamil	
2001	Kadal Pookkal	Uppili	Tamil	
2002	Kalusukovalani	Madhavi	Telugu	
2004	Sound Party	Nandhini	Tamil	Posthumous release
