= Murali (Tamil actor) =

Tamil actor

- Born: Murali Siddalingaiah; 19 May 1964; Madras, Tamil Nadu, India
- Died: 8 September 2010 (aged 46); Chennai, Tamil Nadu, India
- Occupations: Actor; Producer
- Years active: 1980–2010
- Spouse: Shobha (m. 1987)
- Children: 3, including Atharvaa and Akash
- Parent(s): S. Siddalingaiah; Dhanalakshmi
- Relatives: Daniel Balaji (Cousin)

Murali Siddalingaiah (19 May 1964 – 8 September 2010), known professionally as Murali, was an Indian actor who worked predominantly in Tamil cinema, where he was known as Puratchi Nayagan. He has mainly acted in Tamil films as well as few Kannada films. He was famous for roles that portrayed him as a perceptive singer or a tragic lover. His son, Atharvaa, debuted as an actor in the 2010 film Baana Kaathadi.

== Early life ==
Murali Siddalingaiah was born on 19 May 1964 in Madras to a Tamil mother and Kannadiga father. Murali had two siblings; a younger brother Suresh (who worked as a child actor) and a sister Santhi. He lived and studied up to his 5th Standard in Chennai, and from 6th Standard to 10th Standard he studied in Bangalore. When he was 14 years old, he joined as an assistant director to his father, film director and writer S. Siddalingaiah. For some time, he worked as an editing assistant.

== Career ==
Murali started his acting career as a lead with the Kannada film Prema Parva (1983) directed by his father; however, Geluvina Hejje (1982) directed by Eranki Sharma was released first. Bili Gulabi, Ajeya, Prema Gange, Thayikotta Thali, Sambhavami Yuge Yuge, and Ajay Vijay are the Kannada films he did; however, he only gained fame after entering into Tamil film industry through the film Poovilangu (1984). He earned a good name with that film. He then acted in Pagal Nilavu, along with actress Revathi and directed by Mani Ratnam who made his directorial debut in Tamil cinema. Though this film garnered Murali great recognition, he could not sustain his success much longer. His films started failing at the box-office one after another and during that period, he even acted in double hero subjects : Vanna Kanavugal (1987) with Karthik, Thangamani Rangamani (1989) with S. Ve. Shekher and Ninaivu Chinnam (1989) with Prabhu.

In 1990, he starred in Vikraman's Pudhu Vasantham along with Sithara and Anand Babu, where he plays one amongst four friends who find themselves unexpectedly saddled with a young woman. The film was successful and set off a trend of "friendship" based movies and also propelled his career. In 1991, he acted in Idhayam, where he portrayed the soft hero who was incapable of expressing his love due to his inferiority complex. Soon, Murali found himself playing in rural drama films: Chinna Pasanga Naanga (1992), Manikuyil (1993), Manju Virattu (1994), Adharmam (1994), En Aasai Machan (1994) and Poomani (1996).

In 1997, he acted in three films including the romantic-drama Kaalamellam Kadhal Vaazhga and the rural drama Porkkaalam directed by Cheran. The two films received critical acclaim and were blockbusters at the box-office. The next year, he acted in eight films including the long-delayed Veera Thalattu, the romantic-drama films, Kaadhale Nimmadhi, Poonthottam, Unnudan, the village drama films Rathna and En Aasai Rasave. The six films flopped at the box office. Dhinamdhorum was an average grosser while the much-hyped Desiya Geetham, despite positive reviews, bombed at the box office. In 1999, his flop streak continued with Ooty, the fictional biography Iraniyan, based on the life of the freedom fighter Vattakudi Iraniyan and Kanave Kalaiyadhe becoming box office failures.

In 2000, he acted in Vetri Kodi Kattu alongside Parthiban. The movie was a success at the box-office enabling Cheran to develop his own style of film-making. The film also won critical acclaim as well winning a State Award and a National Award in the process. Followed by drama movies, Kannukku Kannaga and Manu Needhi. In 2001, he appeared in five films. He plays in multi-starrers including Sonnal Thaan Kathala, Aanandham, Samudhiram, Alli Thandha Vaanam and Kadal Pookkal. Murali received the Tamil Nadu State Film Award for Best Actor for this film. In 2002, the drama, Kamarasu, the comedy, Sundhara Travels as well as the family film, Namma Veetu Kalyanam was released. The next is Kadhaludan (2003), produced by Devayani and directed by her husband Rajakumaran.

In the early 2000s, Murali lost his appeal at the box office and several of his films, where he collaborated with new directors, subsequently became delayed or shelved. This included project such as Pandian's Kalvettu, Olichandran's Oli, Ramanan's Entrum Sugamae, Abhimanyu's Thala, Paattu Chatham Ketkuthamma and Lovers.

In 2006, he starred in the film, Pasa Kiligal alongside Prabhu, written by M. Karunanidhi. Murali was last seen in a cameo role in Baana Kaathadi (2010), in which his son Atharvaa made his film debut as an actor. His 100th film was the unreleased Kavasam, after which he died at the age of 46 due to cardiac arrest.

== Death ==
Murali died in the early hours of 8 September 2010 from a sudden massive heart attack in Chennai. His death was a big shock to the Tamil film industry and all his fans alike, even to this day. He was 46.

== Filmography ==
=== Tamil films ===
Year	Film	Role	Notes
1984	Poovilangu	Pandiyan	Remake of Prema Parva
1984	Ingeyum Oru Gangai	Kathamuthu	
1984	Pudhiavan	Manohar / Kishore	
1985	Elan Kandru	Velan	
1985	Pagal Nilavu	Selvam	
1985	Geethanjali	James	
1985	Anthasthu	Murali	
1986	Puthir	Vijay / Azhagu	Tamil version of Ajeya
1986	Oru Malarin Payanam	Moorthy	
1986	Kaalamellaam Unn Madiyil	Murali	
1986	Mannukkul Vairam	Mayilsamy	
1987	Kudumbam Oru Koyill	Raja	
1987	Valayal Satham	Sundar	
1987	Vanna Kanavugal	Moorthy	
1987	Aval Mella Sirithal	Murali	
1987	Meendum Mahaan	Murali	
1987	Puyal Paadum Paattu	Student leader	
1987	Thulasi	Sivalingam	
1989	Thangamani Rangamani	Rangamani	
1989	Ninaivu Chinnam	Muttikaal "Muthu" Raj	
1989	Kai Veesamma Kai Veesu	Balu	
1989	Dharma Devan	Arun	
1990	Paalam	Jeeva	
1990	Pudhu Vasantham	Balu	
1990	Vetri Malai	Bhaskar	
1990	Chilambu	Marudhu	
1990	Naanum Indha Ooruthan	Muthu	
1990	Nangal Puthiyavargal	Gowri	
1990	Sirayil Sila Raagangal	Vijay	
1990	Pudhiya Kaatru	Jeeva	
1990	Namma Ooru Poovatha	Ponarasu	Got title 'Puratchi Nayagan'
1991	Sami Potta Mudichu	Kathirvelan	
1991	Iravu Sooriyan	Vijay	
1991	Idhayam	Raja	Nominated, Filmfare Award for Best Actor – Tamil
1991	Kurumbukkaran	Muthurajah	
1992	Thanga Manasukkaran	Murugesh (Murugan)	
1992	Thangarasu	Thangarasu	
1992	Chinna Pasanga Naanga	Muthukaalai	
1992	Thaali Kattiya Raasa	Pandiyan	
1992	Endrum Anbudan	Thyagu	
1993	Manikuyil	Muthuvelu	
1993	Thangakkili	Moorthy	
1994	Adharmam	Arjuna	
1994	En Aasai Machan	Subramani	
1994	Sathyavan	Diwakar	
1994	Manju Virattu	Pandian	
1995	Thondan	Jeeva	Also singer for song "Nattu Nadu Center"
1995	Aakaya Pookal	Siva	
1996	Poove Unakkaga	Murali	Special appearance in song "Machini Vara Neram"
1996	Poomani	Poomani	
1997	Kaalamellam Kadhal Vaazhga	Jeeva	
1997	Porkkalam	Manikkam	
1997	Roja Malare	Kannan	
1998	Kaadhale Nimmadhi	Mohan	
1998	Dhinamdhorum	Aadhi	
1998	Veera Thalattu	Pandian	
1998	Rathna	Rathna / Muthuvel	
1998	Poonthottam	Moorthy	
1998	En Aasai Rasave	Muthumani	
1998	Unnudan	Santhosh	
1998	Desiya Geetham	Pandian	
1999	Poo Vaasam	Kanna	
1999	Kanave Kalaiyadhe	Anand	
1999	Ooty	Balakumar	
1999	Iraniyan	Iraniyan	
2000	Vetri Kodi Kattu	Sekhar	
2000	Kannukku Kannaga	Dharma	
2000	Manu Needhi	Chinnakannu	
2001	Sonnal Thaan Kathala	Murali	
2001	Aanandham	Madhavan	
2001	Samuthiram	Thangarasu	
2001	Alli Thandha Vaanam	Madhavan	Guest appearance
2001	Kadal Pookkal	Karuthayya	Tamil Nadu State Film Award for Best Actor
2002	Kamarasu	Kamarasu	
2002	Sundhara Travels	Gopikrishnan	
2002	Namma Veetu Kalyanam	Ravi	
2003	Kadhaludan	Kalyan	
2004	Arivumani	Arivumani	
2006	Pasa Kiligal	Sevathayya	
2009	Enga Raasi Nalla Raasi	Vijay	
2009	Nee Unnai Arindhaal	Gopal	
2010	Baana Kaathadi	'Idhayam' Raja	Guest appearance

=== Kannada films ===
Year	Film	Role	Notes
1980	Biligiriya Banadalli	Lakshmana	Child actor
1982	Geluvina Hejje	Manchu	
1983	Prema Parva	Sadhguru	
1984	Bili Gulabi	Suresh	
1985	Ajeya	Ajey	Also producer
1986	Prema Gange	Krishna	Remake of Ingeyum Oru Gangai
1987	Thayi Kotta Thaali	Sevu	
1988	Sambhavami Yuge Yuge		
1989	Padma Vyuha	Kiran	
1990	Ajay Vijay	Ajay	Partially re-shot in Tamil as Puthiya Natchathiram

=== Shelved films ===
Year	Film	Language	Notes	Ref
1988	Chithiram Pesuthadi	Tamil		
1989	Nal Valthukkal	Tamil		
1992	Santharppam	Tamil		
1992	Sooriya Namaskaaram	Tamil		
1995	Karutha Machan	Tamil		
1997	Contractor Mappillai	Tamil		
1997	Irulum Oliyum	Tamil		
1998	Vaazhthukkal	Tamil		
1998	Kaadhal Chinnam	Tamil		
2000	Oli	Tamil		
2010	Kavasam	Tamil	100th Film	
