= Ajeya =

1985 Indian film

- VCD cover
- Directed by: Siddalingaiah
- Screenplay by: Siddalingaiah
- Based on: Ajeya by B. L. Venu
- Produced by: Siddalingaiah; Murali
- Starring: Murali; Sandhya
- Cinematography: V. K. Kannan
- Edited by: R. Rajan; R. Rajashekar
- Music by: Ilaiyaraaja
- Production company: Kamadhenu Art Productions
- Release dates: 3 June 1985 (Kannada): 4 July 1986; (Tamil)
- Running time: 130 minutes
- Country: India
- Languages: Kannada; Tamil

Ajeya ( transl. Invincible) is a 1985 Indian Kannada-language film directed and co-produced by Siddalingaiah and based on the novel of the same name written by B. L. Venu. The film starred Siddalingaiah's son Murali in dual roles and Sandhya. The film has music composed by Ilaiyaraaja.

The film was simultaneously shot in Tamil by the same director as Pudir (transl. Puzzle) with a slightly different supporting cast. This version was released in 1986.

== Plot ==
Anuradha is a wealthy and spoiled teenage girl who is raised by her step-mother, after her father died under mysterious circumstances. Ajey (Vijay in Tamil) appears as a poor educated youth who happens to save her from a group of vagabonds. She, however, constantly gets into fights with Ajey, which eventually leads to the two falling in love. Their love is met with many obstacles, as Anuradha's scheming uncle and cousin try to gain all of Anuradha's wealth. Ajey, on the other hand, has to deal with Chinni as rivals for Anuradha's love. Towards the end as everything seems to go right for the couple, a sudden plot twist occurs when a second Ajey enters the picture and claims himself as the real Ajey and true love of Anuradha. Will Anuradha be able to sort out the identity of the real Murali? Watch the film to find out.

== Cast ==
- Murali as Ajey (Kannada) / Vijay and Azhagu (Tamil)
- Sandhya as Anuradha
- Ashalatha
- Doddanna
- Leelavathi as Ajey's / Vijay's mother
- Anuradha

Kannada version

- Vijay Kashi

Tamil version

- Delhi Ganesh
- Leo Prabhu
- Chinni Jayanth as Vijay's cousin

== Soundtrack ==
All the songs are composed and scored by Ilaiyaraaja, with the lyrics by Doddarangegowda and Shyamsundar Kulkarni for the Kannada version.

Kannada version

Song title	Singer(s)
"Hero Hero Hero"	K. J. Yesudas
"Mathige Modalu"	Malaysia Vasudevan
"Ella Kaleya Balle"	Malaysia Vasudevan
"Sihimuttha Needi"	K. J. Yesudas, S. Janaki
"Alliya Chandira"	S. Janaki

Tamil version

Song	Singers	Lyrics	Length
"Hero Hero"	K. J. Yesudas	Ponnaruvi	04:17
"Katta Nalla"	Malaysia Vasudevan	Gangai Amaran	04:24
"Muthal Mutham"	K. J. Yesudas, S. Janaki	Mu. Metha	04:30
"Unna Pol Manmathan"	S. Janaki	Gangai Amaran	04:27
"Ellaam Theriyum"	K. J. Yesudas	Vairamuthu	04:26
Theme Music	Instrumental	Ilaiyaraaja	04:27
