= Manasa Veena (1984 film) =

- Theatrical release poster
- Directed by: Relangi Narasimha Rao
- Produced by: Rama Arankannal
- Starring: Revathi; Rajkumar; Balaji; Sumithra
- Music by: M. S. Viswanathan
- Release date: 15 June 1984
- Country: India
- Language: Telugu

Manasa Veena is a 1984 Indian Telugu-language film, directed by Relangi Narasimha Rao and produced by Rama Arankannal. The film stars Revathi, Rajkumar, Balaji and Sumithra. The film has musical score by M. S. Viswanathan. The movie was dubbed into Malayalam, with the name Thennal Thedunna Poovu.

== Cast ==
- Revathi
- Rajkumar
- Balaji
- Sumithra

== Soundtrack ==
The music was composed by M. S. Viswanathan and lyrics were written by Acharya Aatreya.

Telugu

No.	Song	Singers	Lyrics	Length (m:ss)
1	"Hrudayanni Evaru"	Vani Jayaram		
2	"Nee Neeli Nayanala"	S. P. Balasubrahmanyam, P. Susheela		
3	"Okanoka Thota Lo"	P. Susheela		
4	"Ekkadidi Ee Veena"	K. J. Yesudas, P. Susheela		
5	"Busalu Kodithene"	S. P. Balasubrahmanyam		

Malayalam

No.	Song	Singers	Lyrics	Length (m:ss)
1	"En Manassil"	K. J. Yesudas, Vani Jairam	Mankombu Gopalakrishnan	
2	"Hridayathin Madhuramadhurageetham"	Vani Jairam	Mankombu Gopalakrishnan	
3	"Nin Neela Nayanangal"	K. J. Yesudas, S. Janaki	Mankombu Gopalakrishnan	
4	"Oreyoru Thottathil"	P. Susheela	Mankombu Gopalakrishnan	
5	"Phanam Virichaal"	S. P. Balasubrahmanyam	Mankombu Gopalakrishnan	
