= Thondan (1995 film) =

- Directed by: Karvannan
- Written by: Karvannan; Dheeran (dialogues)
- Produced by: R. K. Film Makers Circuit
- Starring: Murali; Rohini
- Cinematography: Sundarrajan
- Edited by: Sai Nagesh
- Music by: Rajan Sarma
- Production company: R. K. Film Makers Circuit
- Release date: 10 March 1995
- Running time: 125 minutes
- Country: India
- Language: Tamil

Thondan (transl. Worker) is a 1995 Indian Tamil-language political drama film directed by Karvannan. The film stars Murali and Rohini, with Anandaraj, Manivannan, Srividya, Vinodhini, Vadivukkarasi, Gnanavel and S. Ramadoss playing supporting roles. It was released on 10 March 1995.

== Plot ==
Jeeva (Murali) is an auto-driver. During his childhood, Jeeva could not go to school because of his father, who forced him to work at a very young age, thus he suffers from an inferiority complex. Every time, he sees a child working, Jeeva feels angry and he then forces the kid to go to school at any cost. Unlike Jeeva, his childhood friend Ilavenil (Anandaraj) pursued an education and he is now a conscientious police officer.

Periyanayagam (Gnanavel) is a company owner employing child labour and he is involved in some kind of illegal business. Periyanayagam has the support of the Minister (Manivannan) who helps him when he is in trouble with the police, which irks the police officer Ilavenil.

Sanjeevi Raman (S. Ramadoss) is a doctor and a political crusader who has fought against child labour for many years and he filed a lawsuit against this practice. He won the lawsuit, and subsequently, companies who forced kids to work are now banned by the government. Periyanayagam and the other company owners decide to kill the doctor. While planning their attack, the street dancer Selvi (Vinodhini) hears their plan and she is killed on the spot. The librarian Subha (Rohini) witnesses the murder and runs away from the murderers. In a big trouble, Jeeva comes to protect Subha from Periyanayagam's henchmen. What transpires later forms the crux of the story.

== Cast ==
- Murali as Jeeva
- Rohini as Subha
- Anandaraj as Ilavenil
- Manivannan as Minister
- Srividya as Singer
- Vinodhini as Selvi
- Vadivukkarasi
- Gnanavel as Periyanayagam
- S. Ramadoss as Dr. Sanjeevi Raman
- Loose Mohan as Police constable
- Kumarimuthu
- Kanshyam
- Indrajith
- Williams
- Kaaliswaran
- Sanjay Kanth
- Madurai Murugesh
- Madurai Ramasekhar
- Kanchi Durai
- Sathyanath
- Sankar
- Pon Manikkam
- Rangammal
- Jayaprakash (uncredited role)
- Karunanidhi as himself

== Soundtrack ==
The soundtrack was composed by Rajan Sarma, who also wrote the lyrics.

Song	Singer(s)	Duration
"Littaalaa"	Mano, K. S. Chithra	4:41
"Manamirunthaal"	Mano	3:53
"Ethukku Silithu"	Suresh Peters	4:40
"Chinna Chinna"	Minmini	4:41
"Natta Nadu"	Murali	3:52
