= Sound Party =

2004 Indian film

- Poster
- Directed by: Aarthi Kumar
- Story by: Mani Shornur
- Produced by: G. Ramachandran
- Starring: Sathyaraj; Prathyusha
- Music by: Deva
- Production company: G. R. Gold Films
- Release date: 6 August 2004
- Country: India
- Language: Tamil

Sound Party is a 2004 Indian Tamil-language film directed by Aarthi Kumar. The film stars Sathyaraj and Prathyusha, with Vadivelu in a pivotal role. The film, produced by G. Ramachandran, was released after several delays in August 2004. The film was a remake of Malayalam film Kottaram Veettile Apputtan.

== Plot ==
Kumaresan is a rich landlord in a village who spends his wealth for the welfare of his village in Erode district. As Kumaresan's parents died when he was young, he has no one to care for except his sidekicks (Vadivelu, Manivannan and Halwa Vasu). Local Panchayath president Govindan also hails from the same village who has enmity with Kumaresan. Kumaresan does not respect Govindans growth from being a labor in his farm to a rich politician, and Govindan keeps interrupting often whenever Kumaresan wants to find a bride.

Nandini comes from a poor family whose father (GR) is a drunkard. Nandini excels in academics and gets admission into a government medical college but has literally no money for her education. Kumaresan has a soft corner for Nandini and comes for rescue by taking responsibility for her education expenses. Slowly, Kumaresan falls in love with Nandini, but does not disclose it to her. However, Nandini views Kumaresan as her well-wisher.

In 5 years, Nandini graduates as a physician while Kumaresan also builds a small hospital in his village and Nandini gets employed there. Nandini's father plans for her to marry Govindan's son. This infuriates Kumaresan, who announces his love for Nandini which shocks her. Nandini replies that she never had any such feelings towards Kumaresan as she always has a huge respect for him but not love. This worries Kumaresan and understands that it was his mistake to take Nandini for granted. Nandini's wedding is arranged with Govindan's son, but Nandini decides to marry Kumaresan in the end as she thinks that is how she can reciprocate for all the help of Kumaresan. In the end, Kumaresan and Nandini are married.

== Cast ==
- Sathyaraj as Kumaresan
- Prathyusha as Nandini
- Vadivelu
- Manivannan
- Dhamu as Doctor
- Mayilsamy
- Ilavarasu
- Periya Karuppu Thevar
- Chelladurai
- Kovai Senthil
- Nellai Siva
- Halwa Vasu
- Vengal Rao
- Bonda Mani
- G. Ramachandran as Nandini's father
- Anumohan
- Sabitha Anand as Sarasu

== Production ==
The film progressed with shoots in Pollachi taking place in 2001, with producer GR choosing to also play a role in the film. It was Prathyusha's last release. The song "Kaveri Penne" was shot at Azhiyar dam at Pollachi.

== Soundtrack ==
Soundtrack was composed by Deva. The song "Aavani Ponthingal" from the original Malayalam film is retained here as "Kaveri Penne".

Song	Singers	Lyrics	Length
"Kaveri Penne"	P. Unnikrishnan	Snehan	03:59
"Kottampatti Oorukkulle"	Sundarrajan, Mano	Snehan	04:48
"Naan Hindustani"	Jay Karthik	Snehan	05:02
"Pooparikkum"	Sabesh	Snehan	06:01
"Raasathi"	Tippu, Harini	Snehan	04:26

== Critical reception ==
Malathi Rangarajan from The Hindu noted it was "typical fare" and that "it evokes only a lukewarm response because both the hero's characterisation and the storyline are vague throughout." Malini Mannath of Chennai Online wrote, "If Satyaraj can be subtle and fascinating to watch, he can also be loud and overplaying to the gallery, as he has proved here". She added, "The title, however, seems an apt one. For the whole scenario is a verbal, loud and noisy affair". Sify wrote, "The film is shoddily shot and director Senthil Kumar has no clue about how the story progresses. Satyaraj is stale in such roles as he does his usual comedy. Late Pratyusha is ok. Deva rehashes the Malayalam tunes which fail to impress. On the whole Sound Party is hollow and is a waste of time".
