= Manu Needhi =

- DVD cover
- Directed by: Thambi Ramaiah
- Written by: Thambi Ramaiah
- Produced by: R. P. Poorani
- Starring: Murali; Prathyusha
- Cinematography: B. Balamurugan
- Edited by: Pazhanivel
- Music by: Deva
- Production company: GR Gold Films
- Release date: 23 December 2000
- Running time: 145 minutes
- Country: India
- Language: Tamil

Manu Needhi (transl. The Law of Manu) is a 2000 Indian Tamil-language drama film directed by Thambi Ramaiah in his debut. The film stars Murali and Prathyusha (in her Tamil debut), while Vadivelu, Napoleon and Nassar play supporting roles. The music was composed by Deva, cinematography was handled by B. Balamurugan, and editing by Pazhanivel. The film was released on 23 December 2000.

== Plot ==
Chinnakkannu lives in a village with his maternal uncle Vellaiyan. Chinnakkannu doesn’t know about his parents and is raised by Velliyan only. Chinnakkannu is very affectionate towards his uncle and is ready to do anything for his uncle’s sake. Once, Vellaiyan asks Chinnakkanu to woo Poongodi, the only daughter of Muthazhagu, a rich Zamindar from the nearby village. Chinnakkannu disguises himself as an orphan and joins as a worker in Muthazhagu’s house and, also wins the hearts of both Poongodi and Muthazhagu gradually. On the day of wedding between Chinnakkannu and Poongodi, Vellaiyan interrupts and takes away Chinnakannu with him cancelling the wedding. Chinnakkannu requests Vellaiyan to reveal the reason for his actions but Vellaiyan does not. Chinnakkannu feels guilty for cheating Poongodi and picks up a quarrel with Vellaiyan.

Chinnakkannu meets one of Muthazhagu’s servants and finds the truth for Vellaiyan’s actions. A flashback is shown where Muthazhagu is widely respected by everyone in his village for his involvement in freedom struggle against the British. One day, he gets drunk and rapes a girl without consciousness. The victim is Vellaiyan's fiancé, who happens to be Chinnakannu's sister. Muthazhagu feels bad for his actions and marries the victim. However, she dies during her delivery, and Poongodi is born to her. Vellaiyan is agitated due to this as his life is ruined due to Muthazhagu and plans to revenge him by using Chinnakkannu. Knowing this, Chinnakkannu empathises for Vellaiyan and decides to convince him and make him understand that using Poongodi to revenge Muthazhagu is not the right way.

However, Vellaiyan remains stubborn in his actions and does not listen to Chinnakkannu. Also, Vellaiyan does not want to reveal the truth to Chinnakkannu thinking that Chinnakkannu might start supporting Poongodi in case if he gets to know that she is his cousin unaware that Chinnakkannu already knows the truth. All the efforts by Chinnakkannu goes in vain to convince Vellaiyan. Finally, Chinnakkannu loses his patience and decides to leave Vellaiyan and join hands with Poongodi. He also reveals that he is already aware of the truth and does not want to inform Vellaiyan about this. Vellaiyan is transformed and forgives Muthazhagu. Finally, Chinnakkannu joins with Poongodi.

== Cast ==
- Murali as Chinnakannu Servai
- Prathyusha as Poongodi
- Vadivelu as Sevalai Thevar
- Napoleon as Muthazhagu Servai
- Nassar as Vellaiya Thevar
- Priyanka as Vellaiyan's fiancé
- Thambi Ramaiah as Dharmalingam Pillai, marriage broker
- Sithara as Swarnam
- Mahanadi Shankar
- Thalapathy Dinesh
- G. Ramachandran as Chittappa

== Soundtrack ==
Music was composed by Deva.

Song	Singers	Lyrics	Length
Yele Karuthamma	Krishnaraj, Anuradha Sriram	Snehan	05:39
Koottam Romba	Sirkazhi G. Sivachidambaram, Anuradha Sriram	Lakshmi Priyan	04:30
Enga Oorukku Mattum	S. P. Balasubrahmanyam, K. S. Chithra	Snehan	05:38
Oru Roja Thottam	K. S. Chithra, P. Unnikrishnan	Snehan	05:25
Mayilaadum Paarai	S. Sathya	Kalaikumar	04:45

== Reception ==
Dinakaran wrote, "Director J.Thambi Ramaiya has written the story and screenplay following the cinematic style of his guru director P.Vasu. The grandeur that marks the picturization makes us feel how great the co-operation extended by the producer might have been". Malini Mannath of Chennai Online wrote, "The screenplay is well etched with the right dose of humour, action and sentiment. It is only in the second half that the director gets a bit distracted and includes new characters [..]". Savitha Padmanabhan of The Hindu wrote, "Manuneedhi has nothing new to offer. Just the same old plot handled in just about the same old way!". K. Vijiyan of New Straits Times wrote, "Catch this movie if you like countryside-based stories". Krishna Chidambaram of Kalki called the film just average.
