= Paalam (1990 film) =

- Poster
- Directed by: Karvannan
- Written by: Karvannan; C. N. A. Parimalam (dialogues)
- Produced by: M. V. Jayaprakash
- Starring: Murali; M. N. Nambiar; Kitty; Vasudevan Baskaran
- Cinematography: P. S. Dharan
- Edited by: Nagesh Rao
- Music by: N. S. T. Rajesh
- Production company: S. S. Screens
- Release date: 10 March 1990
- Running time: 115 minutes
- Country: India
- Language: Tamil

Paalam (transl. Bridge) is a 1990 Indian Tamil-language vigilante film directed by Karvannan. The film stars Murali, M. N. Nambiar, Kitty and newcomer Vasudevan Baskaran, with Senthil, Anuja, Suryakanth, Balambika, Kannan, Ramesh and Gowri in supporting roles. It was released on 10 March 1990.

== Plot ==
In the past, Jeeva was a college student studying in the city. His family lived in his native village, he has a brother Muthu, a sister-in-law Vadivukkarasi and a blind sister Selvi. Muthu and the villagers were tired of getting a small amount for their manual labour, so they went on strike. The wealthy landlord Arivumathi reluctantly accepted for their claim, he felt that the villagers didn't respect him anymore. So Arivumathi sent henchmen to kill Muthu, in the meantime, Arivumathi raped his wife Vadivukkarasi and he kidnapped the blind Selvi. His henchmen set fires on the thatched houses of the poor villagers. Using his power, Arivumathi made Muthu and Vadivukkarasi arrested by the police and were sent to jail. Jeeva later came to save his sister Selvi.

Now, one year later, Arivumathi becomes a corrupt minister. Jeeva sends his sister Selvi to a college for the blind. Jeeva and his college friends find themselves unemployed after college. One day, they tease Arivumathi while he attends a college function and the police arrest two of Jeeva's friends. They strongly believe that the corrupt politicians are the reason behind their unemployment. Jeeva and his friends thus plan to kidnap the corrupt minister Arivumathi. Arivumathi often travels in his car the night and always takes the Paramankeni bridge. So Jeeva put dynamites under that bridge, Jeeva and his friends acquire heavy weapons.

One night, they stop the minister's car on the bridge, they drive out the driver and the minister's secretary. They keep Arivumathi as a hostage. The news reaches the police, assistant commissioner of police Rajan Sharma with his brigade come to the spot of kidnapping. Rajan Sharma asks them to release the minister but Jeeva refuses. Jeeva first wants the police to free his brother, his sister-in-law and two of his friends who are in jail for the crime they didn't commit. Then superintendent of police Izhavenil comes to help the police team. Izhavenil and Rajan Sharma are pressured by IG Ramaraj, their superior does not want to release the innocent captives. The police try to save the minister in many ways but fail every time. What transpires later forms the crux of the story.

== Cast ==
- Murali as Jeeva
- M. N. Nambiar as SP Izhavenil
- Kitty as ACP Rajan Sharma
- Vasudevan Baskaran as Arivumathi
- Senthil
- Anuja as an item number
- Suryakanth as Muthu
- Balambika as Selvi
- Kannan as Sridhar
- Ramesh as IG Ramaraj
- Gowri as Vadivukkarasi
- Sree Bala
- Sulakshana as Sulakshana
- Bhanu Sree
- S. Ramadoss as himself
- Iniyan Sampath as himself
- Cho Ramaswamy as himself

== Soundtrack ==
The soundtrack was composed by N. S. T. Rajesh, with lyrics written by Rajan Sarma.

Song	Singer(s)	Duration
"Intha Vanam"	P. Susheela	3:35
"Paalam Paalam"	Mano, Krishnaraj, Chorus	4:04
"Aatchi Panna Ayyakannu"	Mano, Chorus	3:40
"Jagadamba Jagadamba"	Malaysia Vasudevan	3:33
"Chinna Chinna Pengalukku"	Mano, P. Susheela	4:07

== Reception ==
P. S. S. of Kalki called it a different kind of film, modern art.
