= Seethamma Pelli =

- VCD cover
- Directed by: Bapu
- Based on: Mullum Malarum by Mahendran
- Produced by: Jayakrishna
- Starring: Mohan Babu; Revathi; Mucherla Aruna; Murali Mohan
- Music by: S. P. Balasubrahmanyam
- Production company: Muddu Art Movies
- Release date: 30 June 1984
- Country: India
- Language: Telugu

Seethamma Pelli (transl. Seethamma's wedding) is a 1984 Indian Telugu-language drama film directed by Bapu. A remake of the 1978 Tamil film Mullum Malarum, it stars Mohan Babu, Revathi, Mucherla Aruna, and Murali Mohan. The film was released on 30 June 1984.

== Cast ==
- Mohan Babu
- Revathi as Seethamma
- Mucherla Aruna
- Murali Mohan
- Nutan Prasad
- Rallapalli
- Silk Smitha in a special appearance

== Soundtrack ==
The soundtrack was composed by S. P. Balasubrahmanyam, and lyrics were written by Veturi.

No.	Title	Singer(s)	Length
1.	"Shocku Oh Yamma Shocku"	P. Susheela, S. P. Balasubrahmanyam
2.	"Yemaayanu Thali"	P. Susheela, S. P. Sailaja
3.	"Segathaggani"	P. Susheela, S. P. Balasubrahmanyam
4.	"Chellivaina"	S. P. Balasubrahmanyam, Chorus

== Release ==
Seethamma Pelli was released on 30 June 1984. The film was commercially successful, although not as much as the original. For her performance, Revathi won the Cinema Express Award for Best Telugu Actress.
