= Revathi =

Indian actress

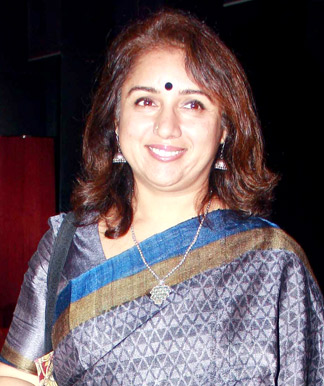
- Revathi at the screening of Masaala at PVR
- Born: Asha Kelunni Nair; 8 July 1966 (age 60); Kochi, Kerala, India
- Occupations: Actress; film director; social worker
- Years active: 1983–present
- Works: Full list
- Spouse: Suresh Chandra Menon (m. 1986; div. 2013)
- Children: 1
- Relatives: Geetha Vijayan (cousin); Niranjana Anoop (niece)
- Awards: Full list
- Honours: Kalaimamani (1992)

Asha Kelunni (born 8 July 1966), professionally known as Revathi, is an Indian actress, film director, voice actress, Bharatanatyam dancer and philanthropist known for her works predominantly in Tamil and Malayalam cinema - in addition to Telugu, Hindi and Kannada films. Widely regarded as one of South Indian cinema's most accomplished actresses, she is known for her versatility, natural acting, and ability to portray strong, relatable women. She has received numerous accolades, including three National Film Awards, seven Filmfare Awards South, two Tamil Nadu State Film Awards and a Kerala State Film Award. In 1993, she was honoured with the Kalaimamani, the highest civilian award in the state of Tamil Nadu.

Revathi had her first leading role in Bharathiraja's Mann Vasanai (1983) for which she won the Filmfare Special Award – South. In 1988, she won the Filmfare Award for Best Actress for her performance in Kakkothikkavile Appooppan Thaadikal. She received the National Film Award for Best Supporting Actress and her second Filmfare Award for portraying an innocent and devoted wife in the political drama Thevar Magan (1992). For her performance in the Telugu film Ankuram (1993), she won her third Filmfare Award. Throughout the 1980s and 1990s, Revathi continued to feature in several box-office successful and critically acclaimed films in Tamil, Malayalam and Telugu cinema.

In 2002, she made her debut in direction with the English film, Mitr, My Friend which fetched her the National Film Award for Best Feature Film in English. Further, she directed critically acclaimed films such as Phir Milenge (2004), Kerala Cafe (2009) and Salaam Venky (2022). She debuted as a voice actress in Pasumpon and Aasai (both 1995), rendering her voice for actresses Saranya Ponvannan and Suvalakshmi respectively.

== Early life ==
Revathi was born as Asha Kelunni Nair to Kelunni, a major in the Indian Army, and Lalitha Kelunni in Kochi, Kerala. In a 2024 interview, Revathi stated that her mother is a Palakkad Iyer from the Kerala-Tamil Nadu border.

When she was in school, she took part in a fashion show. Group photos were taken during the show and a photo was chosen to be the cover of a popular Tamil magazine. This happened to be her photo, which was seen by the director Bharathiraja, who at that time was on the lookout for a new heroine for his latest venture, Mann Vasanai.

== Career ==
She made her acting debut with the Tamil film Mann Vasanai in 1983. The film was a silver jubilee hit and she was rewarded with a Filmfare Special Award – South. She then made her Malayalam film debut with the movie titled Kattathe Kilikkoodu in 1983. This film too hit the gold at the box office and was among her biggest hits of the 1980s. . She was introduced to Telugu film industry with 1984 films, Seethamma Pelli by director Bapu and Manasa Veena. Revathy went on to play a blind, rape-survivor Seetha in Tamil in Mahendran’s Kai Kodukkum Kai (1984) opposite Rajinikanth. Revathy went on to play Seetha in Pudhumai Penn (1984) directed by Bharathiraja. The same year she also did Vaidehi Kathirunthal, directed by R. Sundarrajan.

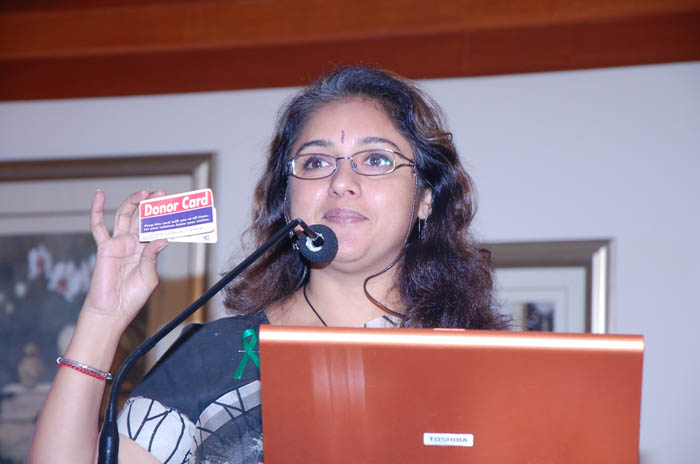
Revathi speaking about organ donation

She was versatile in her choice of roles and often played strong, relatable women characters. Her big break, the one that put her name high on the charts, was her portrayal of Divya, a very spirited and headstrong girl who transforms into a woman through the course of the movie, in Mani Ratnam’s Mouna Ragam (1986).

She was cast opposite Kamal Haasan in Punnagai Mannan in 1986. Revathi won several accolades for her role in the film. The film too was a huge hit and established her as one of the most sought after actress of Tamil film industry. She finally won her first Best Actress Award for her splendid performance in the Malayalam film Kakkothikkavile Appooppan Thaadikal in 1988. She won her Best Actress Award for Tamil film industry with the film titled Kizhakku Vaasal in 1990. She gave hits after hits and gave one of her finest performance in Priyadarshan’s Malayalam film Kilukkam (1991). She made her debut in Hindi with Suresh Krissna’s Love (1991), co-starring Salman Khan. She then won a National Film Award under the category of Best Supporting Actress for her Tamil film Thevar Magan in 1992. She was at the peak of her career in the early 1990s. She also gave occasional appearance in Telugu and Kannada films as well. Revathy again won the Filmfare Award in Balu Mahendra’s Marupadiyum (1993). The golden run lasted until the end of the 1990s, after appearing in some of her most well-regarded films in that decade Anjali (1990), Thevar Magan (1992), Magalir Mattum (1994) were already behind her. She has also won the Tamil Nadu State Film Award Special Prize for Thalaimurai in 1998.

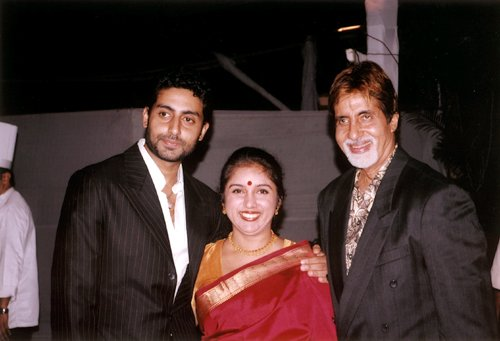
Revathi with Amitabh Bachchan and Abhishek Bachchan at an event

Hindi audiences have savoured Revathi in Margarita with a Straw (2014) and 2 States (2014). She has appeared in the Tamil films Pa. Pandi (2017), Jackpot (2019), and in the Malayalam Virus (2019).

She was seen in the bilingual Telugu and Hindi film Major (2022), where she portrayed Major Sandeep Unnikrishnan's mother, Dhanalakshmi.

In addition to acting, Revathi has directed three features (Mitr, My Friend, Phir Milenge and Salaam Venky) and contributed an episode each to the anthology films Kerala Cafe and the unreleased Mumbai Cutting.

She won Kerala State Film Award for Best Actress and Filmfare Critics Award for Best Actress – Malayalam in Bhoothakaalam (2022).

== Personal life ==
Revathi married cinematographer and director Suresh Chandra Menon in 1986. The couple did not have any children. However, following differences between them, they started living separately from 2002 and were granted divorce on 23 April 2013 by Chennai Additional Family Court.

In 2018, she revealed that she has a five-year old biological daughter through in vitro fertilisation.

== In the media ==
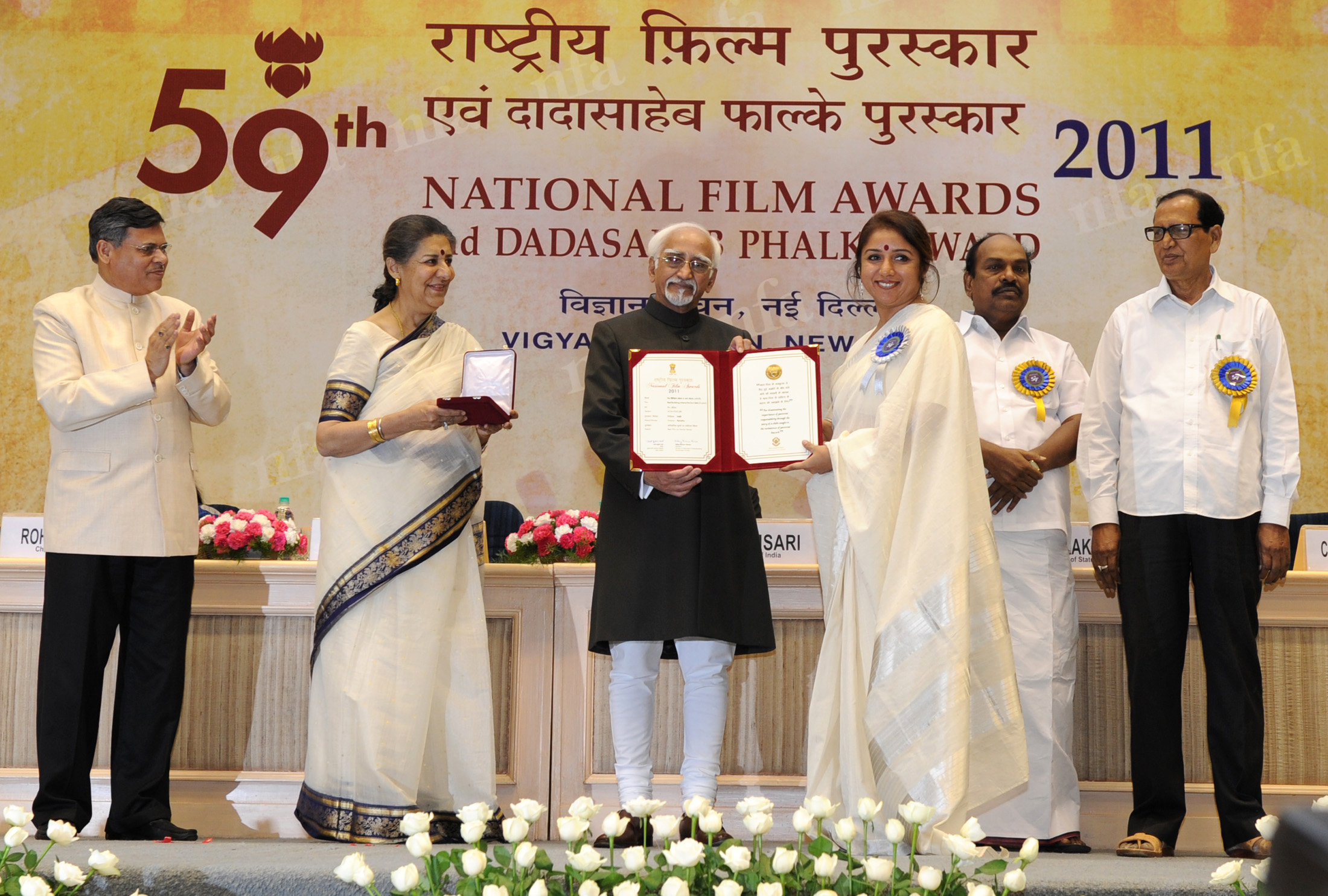
Revathi receiving the Rajat Kamal award at the 59th Film Awards

Revathi is a trained Bharatanatyam dancer, having studied since the age of seven and performed her arangetram in Chennai in 1979. She has been considered one of the all-time top actresses of Tamil cinema and South Indian cinema. She was one of the most successful leading actresses of South Indian cinema. Revathi was the only South Indian actress of 80s and 90s to win the Filmfare best actress award in Tamil, Telugu and Malayalam, including three consecutive wins in Tamil. Apart from films, Revathi has been involved in a variety of social organisations, the most notable being the Banyan, Ability foundation, Tanker foundation and Vidyasagar, and has also served as a member of several film festivals including the Chennai International Film Festival and the International Film Festival of India.
