= List of Tamil films of 1992 =

Post-amendment to the Tamil Nadu Entertainments Tax Act 1939 on 1 April 1958, Gross jumped to 140 per cent of Nett Commercial Taxes Department disclosed ₹76 crore in entertainment tax revenue for the year.

A list of films produced in the Tamil film industry in India in 1992 by release date:

== Movies ==
=== January — March ===
Opening		Title	Director	Cast	Production	Ref
J A N	15	Amaran	K. Rajeshwar	Karthik, Bhanupriya	Annalakshmi Films	
J A N	15	Aval Oru Vasantham	Jayadevan	Prabhuraj, Jayanthi	Sharmila Creations	
J A N	15	Brahmachari	Muktha Srinivasan	Nizhalgal Ravi, Gautami	Muktha Films	
J A N	15	Chinna Gounder	R. V. Udayakumar	Vijayakanth, Sukanya, Goundamani, Senthil	Ananthi Films	
J A N	15	Ilavarasan	Senthilnathan	R. Sarathkumar, Sukanya	Sathya Movies	
J A N	15	Mannan	P. Vasu	Rajinikanth, Vijayashanti, Khushbu, Goundamani	Sivaji Productions	
J A N	15	Pandithurai	Manoj Kumar	Prabhu, Khushbu, Goundamani, Senthil	K. B. Films	
J A N	15	Rickshaw Mama	P. Vasu	Sathyaraj, Khushbu, Gautami, 'Baby' Sridevi	Shri Mishri Productions	
J A N	15	Sundara Kandam	K. Bhagyaraj	K. Bhagyaraj, Bhanupriya, Sindhuja	Saranya Cine Combines	
J A N	15	Vanna Vanna Pookkal	Balu Mahendra	Prashanth, Mounika, Vinodhini	Subramaniya Films	
F E B	1	Chinna Thayee	S. Ganesaraj	Vignesh, Padmasri, Goundamani, Senthil	M. S. R. Films	
F E B	7	Agni Paarvai	P. Madhavan	Su. Thirunavukkarasar, Nizhalgal Ravi, Saranya Ponvannan, Ramkumar, Anju	Ponmanam Films	
F E B	7	Rendu Pondatti Kaavalkaaran	Relangi Narasimha Rao	Anand Babu, Rohini, Vaidehi, Senthil	Sree Productions	
F E B	7	Thambi Pondatti	Panchu Arunachalam	Rahman, Nizhalgal Ravi, Sukanya, Ramya Krishnan	Geetha Chithra Combines	
F E B	14	Kaaval Geetham	S. P. Muthuraman	Vikram, Sithara	Vaasan Brothers	
F E B	14	Moondrampadi	Karvannan	Raghul, Latha	Easwari Productions	
F E B	14	Unnai Vaazhthi Paadugiren	Sridev	Parthiban, Suman Ranganathan, Mohini	Motherland Pictures	
F E B	21	Sugamana Sumaigal	Parthiban	Parthiban, Shali, 'Baby' Sridevi	Isswariyan Pictures	
F E B	27	Naane Varuven	Sripriya	Sripriya, Rahman, Radhika	Sree Samundeshwari Productions	
F E B	28	Jodi Sendhachu	Lakshmi	Sivachandran, Radhika, Sriram, Sowmiya	Savitha Chithra Films	
F E B	28	Periya Gounder Ponnu	Manivasagam	R. Sarathkumar, Gautami, Goundamani, Senthil	Raaja Pushpa Pictures	
M A R	6	Government Mappillai	Manivannan	Anandaraj, Kasthuri, Ramkumar, Saradha Preetha	Madhu Films International	
M A R	6	Kasu Thangakasu	Mohamed Raj	Yogaraj, Madhu	R. R. Circuit	
M A R	6	Marupakkam	K. S. Sethumadhavan	Sivakumar	NFDC	
M A R	6	Sivantha Malar	Sasi Mohan	R. Sarathkumar, Gautami, Goundamani, Senthil	K. R. G. Movie International	
M A R	13	Naangal	Haasan	Sivaji Ganesan, Prabhu, Deepika, Srividya	Haariya Productions	
M A R	20	Kasthuri Manjal	J. B. Rajaravi	Jagadeesh, Rupini	Amar Jyothi Pictures	
M A R	20	Thanga Manasukkaran	Rajavarman	Murali, Sivaranjani, Goundamani, Senthil	Yathava Productions	

=== April — June ===
Opening		Title	Director	Cast	Production	Ref
A P R	10	Enga Veetu Velan	T. Rajendar	Rekha, Selvaraj, Silambarasan	Chimbu Cine Arts	
A P R	11	Thangarasu	K. Alexander	Murali, Anusha	Arulmigu Chelliamman Cine Arts	
A P R	12	Innisai Mazhai	Shoba Chandrasekhar	Neeraj, Parveen	V. V. Creations	
A P R	12	Unna Nenachen Pattu Padichen	Guru Dhanapal	Karthik, Sasikala, Monisha	Sree Padmavathy Movie Makers	
A P R	13	Singaravelan	R. V. Udayakumar	Kamal Haasan, Khushbu, Goundamani	Pavalar Creations	
A P R	13	Therku Theru Machan	Manivannan	Sathyaraj, Bhanupriya, Goundamani, Senthil	Anbalaya Films	
A P R	16	Bharathan	S. D. Sabha	Vijayakanth, Bhanupriya	Rowther Films	
A P R	17	Chembaruthi	R. K. Selvamani	Prashanth, Roja, Bhanumathi	Motherland Pictures	
A P R	17	Senbaga Thottam	Manobala	Selva, Rohini	Leo International	
A P R	18	Nadodi Thendral	Bharathiraja	Karthik, Ranjitha	Manoj Creations	
A P R	18	Tamil Ponnu	K. Muthu Vijayan	Radhika, Ravi Rahul, Vandhana	Arunothaya Film Circuit	
A P R	24	Chinnavar	Gangai Amaran	Prabhu, Kasthuri, Goundamani, Senthil	Indrani Movies	
M A Y	1	Chinna Pasanga Naanga	Raj Kapoor	Murali, Revathi, Saradha Preetha, Goundamani, Senthil	A. G. S. Movies	
M A Y	1	Oor Mariyadhai	K. S. Ravikumar	R. Sarathkumar, Sasikala, Napoleon, Goundamani, Senthil	Super Good Films	
M A Y	1	Sivashankari	Rama Narayanan	Nizhalgal Ravi, Yamuna, 'Baby' Shamili	Sri Thenaandal Pictures	
M A Y	15	Nadodi Pattukkaran	N. K. Viswanathan	Karthik, Mohini	Murugan Cine Arts	
M A Y	15	Unakkaga Piranthen	Balu Anand	Prashanth, Mohini	Vivekananda Film Circuit	
M A Y	22	Pokkiri Thambi	Senthilnathan	Anandaraj, Kaveri	Kavi Bharathi Creations	
M A Y	22	Vaaname Ellai	K. Balachander	Anand Babu, Ramya Krishnan, Madhoo	Kavithalayaa Productions	
M A Y	22	Yermunai	Arun Mozhi	Nassar, Subhala	Udumalai Cine Arts	
M A Y	23	Chinna Marumagal	Prasanthkumar	Sivaji Ganesan, Siva, Mohini	K. R. Enterprises	
M A Y	29	Idhuthanda Sattam	Senthilnathan	R. Sarathkumar, Rekha, Aamani, Goundamani, Senthil	G. R. P. Films	
M A Y	29	Oor Panchayathu	Mahendran	Pandiarajan, Mahalakshmi	Muththamizh Movie Creations	
M A Y	29	Pudhusa Padikkiren Paattu	Vetri Selvam	Gowtham, Maadhusri	Paranachi Amman Films	
M A Y	29	Thilakam	R. Raghuvasan	Nizhalgal Ravi, Gautami	Jayalakshmi Movie Combines	
J U N	5	Aavarampoo	Bharathan	Vineeth, Nandhini	K. R. Enterprises	
J U N	5	Idhu Namma Bhoomi	P. Vasu	Karthik, Khushbu	Uzhaikkum Karangal Art Productions	
J U N	5	Kizhakku Velathachu	Thalapathy	Anandaraj, Raja, Aishwarya	Shiva Shree Pictures	
J U N	5	Sevagan	Arjun	Arjun, Khushbu	Sreeram Films International	
J U N	12	Gowri Manohari	T. S. Krishna Kumar	Mano Chander, Chandrika	Arun Kesavalaya Productions	
J U N	19	Nenja Thotta Sollu	T. N. Kanna	Pari, Vidhyasree	Kalaikadal Films	
J U N	26	Amma Vandhachu	P. Vasu	K. Bhagyaraj, Khushbu, Baby Sridevi	Saranya Cine Combines	
J U N	27	Annaamalai	Suresh Krishna	Rajinikanth, Khushbu, Sarath Babu	Kavithalayaa Productions	
J U N	27	Ponnuketha Purushan	Gangai Amaran	Ramarajan, Gautami, Goundamani, Senthil	Mars International	

=== July — September ===
Opening		Title	Director	Cast	Production	Ref
J U L	3	Chinna Poovai Killathey	Senthilnathan	Rajaprabhu, Nandhini	Ganesh Cine Arts	
J U L	4	Vasantha Malargal	A. R. Ramesh	Hariraj, Shali	Kumudavalli Pictures	
J U L	10	Vaa Vaa Vasanthame	Pala. Karuppiah	Elango, Selvi	Kamalachithram	
J U L	16	Thaali Kattiya Raasa	Vijaya Kanna	Murali, Kanaka, Goundamani, Senthil	Poomagal Pictures Circuit	
J U L	17	Kalikaalam	Panchu Arunachalam	Nizhalgal Ravi, Radhika	Seetha Chithra Combines	
J U L	24	Magudam	Prathap K. Pothan	Sathyaraj, Gautami, Bhanupriya, Goundamani, Senthil	K. B. Films	
J U L	24	Suyamariyadhai	R. Vijay Ganesh	Karthik, Pallavi	Sri Vadivudai Amman Creations	
J U L	24	Uyiril Oru Raagam	A. Siva Prasad	Sanjeev Prakash, Kavya	Umar Art Creations	
A U G	14	Endrum Anbudan	Bhagyanathan	Murali, Sithara, Heera	Sathya Jyothi Films	
A U G	14	Mudhal Kural	V. C. Guhanathan	Sivaji Ganesan, Arjun, Kanaka	Ananth and Ananth Films	
A U G	14	Muthal Seethanam	Erode Sounder	Siva, Devi Meenakshi, Goundamani, Senthil	Super Good Films	
A U G	14	Naalaya Seidhi	G. B. Vijay	Prabhu, Khushbu, Goundamani, Senthil	Shiva Sree Pictures	
A U G	14	Pattathu Raani	Manivasagam	Vijayakumar, Gautami, Goundamani, Senthil	Rajapushpa Pictures	
A U G	14	Surieyan	Pavithran	R. Sarathkumar, Roja, Goundamani	A. R. S. Film International	
A U G	14	Urimai Oonjaladugiradhu	Visu	Ramesh Aravind, Kasthuri	Lakshmi Productions	
A U G	15	Kottai Vaasal	Selva Vinayagam	Arun Pandian, Sukanya, Saranya	Sree Rajakaliamman Enterprises	
A U G	15	Pondatti Rajyam	K. S. Ravikumar	Saravanan, Ranjitha	Anbalaya Films	
A U G	15	Roja	Mani Ratnam	Arvind Swamy, Madhubala	Kavithalayaa Productions	
S E P	3	Mouna Mozhi	Kasthuri Raja	Ramesh Aravind, Shali	Eknaath Films	
S E P	3	Thai Mozhi	R. R. Ilavarasan	R. Sarathkumar, Vijayakanth, Mohini	Thamizh Annai Creations	
S E P	3	Thalaivaasal	Selva	S. P. Balasubrahmanyam, Anand, Sivaranjani, Bhanu Prakash	Chozha Creations	
S E P	5	Mappillai Vanthachu	Sasi Mohan	Rahman, Gautami	Theivaanai Movies	
S E P	5	Palaivana Raagangal	Senthilnathan	S. P. Balasubrahmanyam, Rekha	Irusaar Amman Films	
S E P	11	Deiva Vaakku	M. S. Madhu	Karthik, Revathi	Amma Creations	
S E P	11	Ellaichami	K. Rangaraj	R. Sarathkumar, Rupini	Nachiyar Movies	
S E P	12	Pangali	K. Subash	Sathyaraj, Bhanupriya, Goundamani	Sivanthi Films	
S E P	18	Kizhakku Veedhi	M. R. Boopathi	Selva, Ranjitha	Kumar Movies	
S E P	18	Madha Komadha	Rama Narayanan	Nizhalgal Ravi, Sithara	Sidhartha Productions	
S E P	18	Samundi	Manoj Kumar	R. Sarathkumar, Kanaka	Sree Rajakaliamman Enterprises	
S E P	25	Annai Vayal	Ponvannan	Vignesh, Raj Murali, Vinodhini, Rayalsri	Sree Raja Rajeshwari Film Corporation	
S E P	25	Annan Ennada Thambi Ennada	Vijay Krishnaraj	Arjun, Nirosha, Sivakumar, Rekha	Sree Athanoor Amman Pictures	
S E P	25	Chinna Chittu	Manivarma	Hariraj, Maria	Maammu Creations	
S E P	25	David Uncle	Guna	Anandaraj, Siva, Sivaranjani, Rekha, Sridevi Vijaykumar	Aarthi International	

=== October — December ===
Opening		Title	Director	Cast	Production	Ref
O C T	2	Annayin Madiyil	S. Rajaguru	Vijay Shankar, Suma	Saraswathi Cine Arts	
O C T	2	Sagalakala Vaandugal	Senthil Kumar	Manoj, Kalaiselvi	Vijay Productions	
O C T	25	Kaviya Thalaivan	K. S. Gopalakrishnan	Vijayakanth, Bhanupriya	Thamizh Ponnie Art	
O C T	25	Mangala Nayagan	K. Raghunath	Ganesh, Ilavarasi	Chellam Kumaran Investment Finance Corporation	
O C T	25	Pandian	S. P. Muthuraman	Rajinikanth, Khushbu, Jayasudha	Visaalam Productions	
O C T	25	Rasukutty	K. Bhagyaraj	K. Bhagyaraj, Aishwarya	P. A. Art Productions	
O C T	25	Sathiyam Adhu Nichayam	T. Durairaj	Sivakumar, Sumithra	Sree Ramalinga Saudasheshwari Films	
O C T	25	Senthamizh Paattu	P. Vasu	Prabhu, Sukanya, Kasthuri	Janaki Films	
O C T	25	Thevar Magan	Bharathan	Kamal Haasan, Sivaji Ganesan, Revathi, Gautami	Raaj Kamal Films International	
O C T	25	Thirumathi Palanisamy	R. Sundarrajan	Sathyaraj, Sukanya, Goundamani	Raj Films International	
N O V	20	Onna Irukka Kathukanum	V. Sekhar	Sivakumar, Sivakumar, Manorama, Vinu Chakravarthy, Goundamani, Senthil	Thiruvalluvar Kalaikoodam	
N O V	27	Abhirami	Dilip Kumar	Saravanan, Kasthuri, Rohini	Super Good Films	
N O V	27	Neenga Nalla Irukkanum	Visu	Nizhalgal Ravi, Bhanupriya	GV Films	
N O V	27	Villu Pattukaran	Gangai Amaran	Ramarajan, Rani, Goundamani, Senthil	Vijaya Movies	
N O V	28	Deiva Kuzhanthai	Senthilnathan	'Baby' Sridevi, Vaishnavi, G. S. Madhu	M. B. S. Film Combines	
D E C	4	Harihara Puthiran	M. N. Balu	Ravi, Rekha	Sree Ganesh Pictures	
D E C	4	Naalaiya Theerpu	S. A. Chandrasekhar	Vijay, Keerthana	V. V. Creations	
D E C	4	Natchathira Nayagan	Senthilnathan	R. Sarathkumar, Rohini, Goundamani, Senthil	Angalamman Creations	
D E C	11	Pudhu Varusham	Rajkamal	Sri Jagan, Yuvarani	Best Friends Creations	
D E C	11	Purushan Enakku Arasan	Rama Narayanan	Pandiarajan, Kanaka	Chinni Cine Circuits	
D E C	11	Solaiyamma	Kasthuri Raja	Rahul, Sukanya	Karpaga Jothi Films	
D E C	18	Kaavalukku Kannillai	Ashwin Kumar	Anand Babu, Nandhini	V. I. P. Film Productions	
D E C	18	Meera	P. C. Sreeram	Vikram, Aishwarya	V. M. C. Cine Creations	
D E C	18	Thoorathu Sontham	K. S. Adhiyaman	Raj Boopathy, Rudra	Omshakti Matha Arts	
D E C	25	Devar Veettu Ponnu	Rama Narayanan	Vijayakumar, Shruti, 'Baby' Shamili, Sunil	Sri Thenaandal Films	
D E C	25	Mr. Prasad	P. S. Dharan	Nassar, Geetha	Lakshmi and Lakshmi Creations	
