= Thambidurai =

Thambidurai may refer to:

- Munisamy Thambidurai (born 1947), Indian politician
- Thambi Durai, Indian film
