= Kamala Kamesh =

Indian actress

- Occupation: Film actress
- Years active: 1979–present
- Spouse: Kamesh (m. 1974–1984)
- Children: Uma Riyaz Khan

Kamala Kamesh (7 October 1952 – 11 January 2025) was an Indian actress in Tamil movies. She was one of the prominent supporting actress in late 1970s and 1980s in Tamil movies. She has acted in nearly 480 movies in Tamil. She is often seen in Visu's movies.

== Personal life ==
She was married to Kamesh, a Tamil music director. Her only daughter Uma Riyaz Khan was born in 1975. She is also an actress in Tamil movies. Malayalam-Tamil actor Riyaz Khan is her son-in-law. She died on 11 January 2025 at her residence in Tiruvallur and the cause of her death is not revealed.

== Career ==
Kamala made her acting debut in critically acclaimed film Kudisai (1979) which became only film to feature her in lead role. Visu who was impressed with her performance cast her in Kudumbam Oru Kadambam and she portrayed elder mother's role in Alaigal Oivathillai which led her to be typecast in similar roles throughout her career.

== Partial filmography ==
=== Tamil ===
Year	Film	Role	Notes
1979	Kudisai		
1981	Alaigal Oivathillai	Vichu's mother	
1981	Kudumbam Oru Kadambam	Lakshmiammal	
1982	Manal Kayiru	Uma's mother	
1982	Simla Special	Babu's mother	
1982	Moondru Mugam	Sagaya Mary	
1982	Punitha Malar		
1982	Gopurangal Saivathillai	Murali's mother	
1982	Agaya Gangai	Aandal	
1982	Mamiyara Marumagala		
1982	Enkeyo Ketta Kural		
1983	Bhagavathipuram Railway Gate		
1984	Naan Paadum Paadal	Maragatham	
1984	Anbulla Rajinikanth		
1984	Puyal Kadantha Bhoomi	Chellammal	
1985	Navagraha Nayagi		
1985	Iravu Pookkal	Mother	
1986	Kadalora Kavithaigal	Thayamma	
1986	Samsaram Adhu Minsaram	Godavari	
1986	Mella Thirandhathu Kadhavu	Meenakshi	
1986	Oru Iniya Udhayam	Thavudu's mother	
1986	Palaivana Rojakkal		
1986	Dharmam		
1987	Kadamai Kanniyam Kattupaadu		
1987	Mangai Oru Gangai		
1987	Ore Oru Gramathiley		
1987	Idhu Oru Thodar Kathai		
1987	Sattam Oru Vilayaattu	Nair's wife	
1987	Koottu Puzhukkal		
1988	Penmani Aval Kanmani	Kamala	
1988	Ullathil Nalla Ullam		
1988	Katha Nayagan		
1989	Poruthathu Pothum		
1989	Annakili Sonna Kathai		
1990	Pulan Visaranai	Vasantha Gopalan's mother	
1990	Pondatti Thevai	Kamala	
1990	Athisaya Piravi		
1990	Paattali Magan		
1991	Thangamana Thangachi	Meenakshi	
1991	Kaaval Nilayam	Murali's mother	
1991	Thanthu Vitten Ennai	Surya's caretaker	
1991	Manasara Vazhthungalen		
1991	Rudhra		
1992	Chinna Gounder		
1992	Idhuthanda Sattam		
1992	David Uncle		
1992	Thirumathi Palanisamy		
1993	Aadhityan		
1993	Chinna Kannamma	Gayatri's mother	
1994	Jaihind		
1994	Pudhiya Mannargal		
1995	Chandralekha	Chandralekha's aunt	
1995	Mannai Thottu Kumbidanum		
1995	Mogamul	Ranganna's wife	
1996	Anthimanthaarai		
2001	Aandan Adimai		
2004	Vishwa Thulasi		
2007	En Uyirinum Melana		
2022	Veetla Vishesham	Jenny Aunty	

=== Malayalam ===
- Velicham Vitharunna Penkutty (1982)
- Rugma (1983)
- Oru Sandesam Koodi (1985)
- Dheem Tharikida Thom (1986)
- Aalorungi Arangorungi (1986)
- Veendum Lisa (1987)
- Amrutham Gamaya (1987)
- Asthikal Pookkunnu (1989)
- Ulsavapittennu (1989)
- Ivalente Kaamuki (Manmadhan) (1989)
- Avan Ananthapadmanaabhan (1994)

=== Kannada ===
- Khadeema Kallaru (1982)
- Premayuddha (1983)
- Ananda Sagara (1983)
- Male Banthu Male (1984)
- Guru Jagadguru (1985)
- Brahma Gantu (1985)
- Chaduranga (1985)
- Prema Pareekshe (1991)

=== Telugu ===
- Aalapaana (1985)
- Annapurnamma Gari Alludu (1988)
- Jaitra Yatra (1991)

=== Television ===
- Mangalyam (Tamil TV Serial)
- Anandha Bhavan
