= R. Sarathkumar =

Indian actor and politician (born 1954)

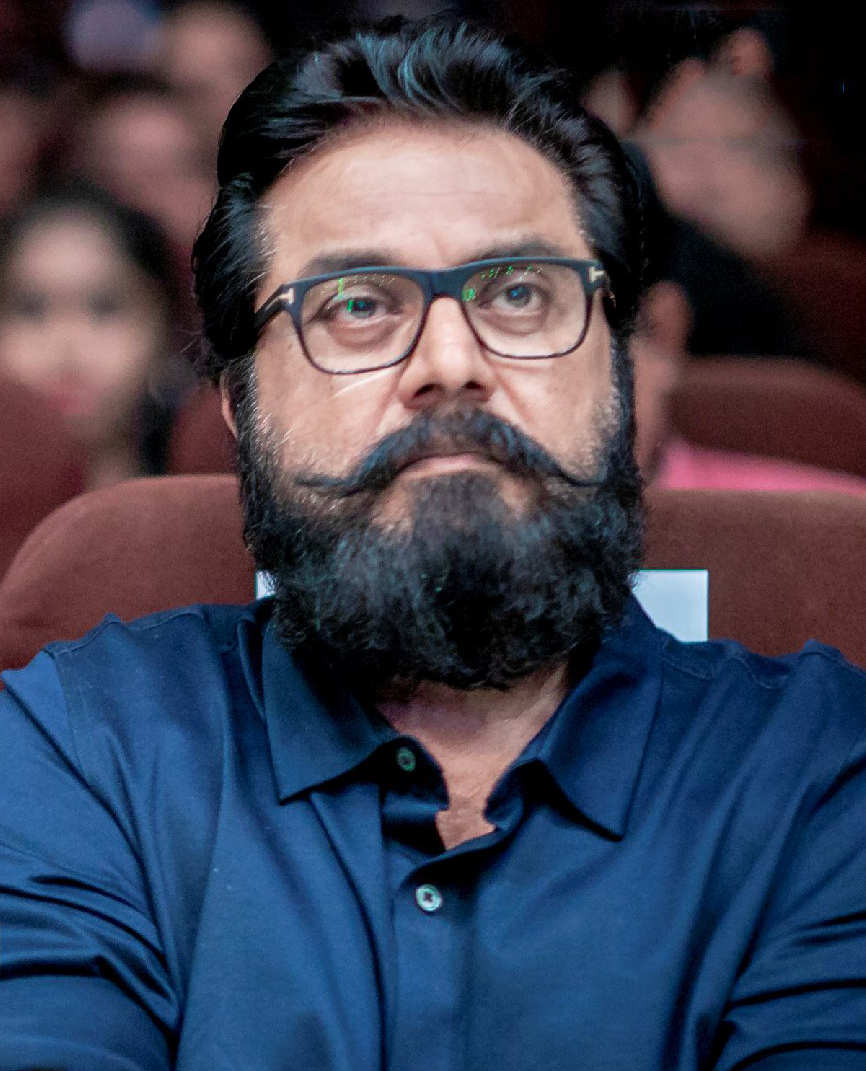
- Sarathkumar at Vaanam Kottatum Audio Launch

Member of Parliament, Rajya Sabha
- In office 25 July 2001 – 31 May 2006
- Chairman: Bhairon Singh Shekhawat; Krishan Kant
- Constituency: Tamil Nadu

Member of Tamil Nadu Legislative Assembly
- In office 23 May 2011 – 21 May 2016
- Chief Minister: J. Jayalalithaa
- Preceded by: V. Karuppasamy Pandian
- Succeeded by: S. Selvamohandas Pandian
- Constituency: Tenkasi

President of the All India Samathuva Makkal Katchi
- In office 31 August 2007 – 12 March 2024
- Vice-President: A. Narayanan; Radhika Sarathkumar
- General Secretary: Karu. Nagarajan; Himself
- Preceded by: position established
- Succeeded by: position abolished

General Secretary of the All India Samathuva Makkal Katchi
- In office 27 January 2016 – 12 March 2024
- President: Himself
- Preceded by: Karu. Nagarajan
- Succeeded by: position abolished

President of the South Indian Artistes' Association
- In office 2006–2015
- Preceded by: Vijayakanth
- Succeeded by: Nassar

Personal details
- Born: Ramanathan Sarathkumar; 14 July 1954 (age 72) New Delhi, India
- Party: Bharatiya Janata Party (2024‍–‍present)
- Other political affiliations: DMK (1996‍–‍2006); AIADMK (2006-2007); All India Samathuva Makkal Katchi (2007‍–‍2024); BJP (2024-Present)
- Spouses: Chaya (m. 1984; div. 2000); Radhika (m. 2001)
- Children: 4 (including Varalaxmi)
- Relatives: M. R. Radha (father in law); Nirosha (sister-in-law); M. R. R. Vasu (brother in law); Radha Ravi (brother in law); Ramki (co-brother); Abhimanyu Mithun (son-in-law)
- Education: The New College, Chennai; Loyola College, Chennai
- Occupation: Actor; politician; filmmaker; bodybuilder
- Awards: MGR Award (1996); Kalaimamani (1993)
- Nicknames: Supreme Star; Super Hero

Ramanathan Sarathkumar (born 14 July 1954) is an Indian actor, politician and former bodybuilder who works predominantly in Tamil cinema in addition to Telugu, Malayalam, Kannada and Hindi films. He has acted in more than 150 films and won two Tamil Nadu State Film Awards and three Filmfare Awards South.

Originally a bodybuilder and later journalist, in 1986, Sarathkumar started his acting career in the Telugu film Samajamlo Sthree. He first acted in negative roles, and later played supporting roles before establishing himself as a lead actor in subsequent years, earning him the titles Super Hero and Supreme Star in Tamil cinema.

In 2007, he launched a new political party All India Samathuva Makkal Katchi (AISMK) in Tamil Nadu, claiming to carry out the ideals of K. Kamaraj. He is the former Member of Legislative Assembly of Tenkasi constituency. He served as the president of the Nadigar Sangam from 2006 to 2015 for three consecutive terms.

== Early life ==
Sarathkumar was born on 14 July 1954 to Ramanathan and Pushpaleela, a Tamil family in New Delhi. His father Ramanathan worked at the All India Radio before joining the Press Information Bureau of India, while his mother Pushpaleela was a housewife. Sarathkumar is the youngest child in his family, he had two siblings; an elder brother, the late Sudarshan Ramanathan and an elder sister Mallika Kandaswamy. His mother Pushpaleela died on 26 October 2013.

Sarathkumar started his schooling at the Raja Muthiah High School, after his family relocated from Delhi to Chennai. He then moved on to the Central School in the Indian Institute of Technology Madras, and finished at St. Patrick's Anglo Indian Higher Secondary School. Being an avid sports enthusiast, he played football, cricket and hockey, representing his school and college teams. He also joined the NCC, becoming an Air Wing Cadet. He was one of the cadets who marched in the Republic Day Parade of 1970. After completing his pre-university levels at Loyola College, he was subsequently graduated with a Bachelor of Science degree in mathematics from The New College.

He later became a bodybuilder and earned the "Mr. Madras University" title in 1974. He then moved to Bangalore to work for the newly started Tamil newspaper Dinakaran, he started as a cycle boy distributing newspapers to shops and later graduated to become a reporter for the same newspaper. After successfully establishing the circulation, he moved on to Chennai. He shifted his energies towards running his own business, a travel agency in Chennai and meeting Kannadasan who elevated him to become a producer.

He is fluent in all major South Indian languages and is quite proficient in Russian.

== Acting career ==
=== 1986–1991: Early career ===
Sarathkumar made his acting debut in 1986, in the Telugu film Samajamlo Sthree at the behest of a producer friend. Sarathkumar was originally cast to play the lead role in Chinna Poove Mella Pesu (1987) directed by Robert–Rajasekar but the producers insisted on having one familiar face and he was replaced by actor Prabhu. In 1988, while running his travel agency in Chennai, Sarathkumar got an opportunity to act as well as produce in the Tamil film Kan Simittum Neram. The film was directed by Kannadasan and he co-starred with Karthik and Ambika. In 1989, R. Sarathkumar was spotted by Raju, the personal make-up man of actor Vijayakanth, who recommended him to the Pulan Visaranai's team. Finally, R. Sarathkumar acted as a villain in Pulan Visaranai and the film turned out to be a blockbuster. He won a Cinema Express Award for Best Villain for his role, which brought him more film offers.

In 1990, he teamed up for the second time with Kannadasan for the film Mr. Karthik, which flopped at the box office. Thereafter, he appeared in antagonist roles in Tamil films such as Pudhu Padagan, Velai Kidaichuduchu, Raja Kaiya Vacha, Engitta Mothathay, Jagathalaprathapan and in Telugu films such as Vishnu, Magaadu and Balachandrudu. He acted in few Tamil films in supporting roles such as Salem Vishnu, Sirayil Sila Raagangal, Mounam Sammadham and Puriyaadha Pudhir. Puriyaadha Pudhir marked the first collaboration with Sarathkumar and director K. S. Ravikumar. He also acted in his first venture as a hero in Palaivana Paravaigal under Senthilnathan's direction, who at that time gave consecutive hits. In 1991, he acted in twelve Tamil films and three Telugu films, mostly in supporting roles and four films in lead roles, but he continued to act in few films as a villain. In the start of 1991, he acted in negative roles in the Telugu film Stuartpuram Police Station, starring Chiranjeevi and Vijayashanti, Namma Ooru Mariamma, Vetri Padigal and Pudhu Manithan. He acted as a retired military officer in Chithirai Pookkal and played the second hero role in the blockbuster film Captain Prabhakaran. In May 1991, he appeared in lead roles in Senthilnathan's Kaaval Nilayam and K. S. Ravikumar's rural drama film Cheran Pandiyan, and starred as Chiranjeevi's brother in the Telugu film Gang Leader, the three were commercially successful. In July 1991, he acted in Archana IAS, co-starring Sithara and acted in the role of the father Vaidehi Kalyanam. At the end of 1991, he played a small role in the Telugu film Surya IPS, a negative role in Pavithran's Vasanthakala Paravai and starred in a lead role in Senthilnathan's Thangamana Thangachi.

=== 1992–1993: Lead roles ===
In 1992, he has acted in 10 films as protagonist and 2 films as antagonist including the Telugu film Agreement, directed by Manivannan and P. C. Sreeram's Meera. In the beginning of 1992, he acted in Senthilnathan's Ilavarasan, alongside Sukanya, Manivasagam's Periya Gounder Ponnu and Sivantha Malar. In mid-1992, he worked in K. S. Ravikumar's Oor Mariyadhai, co-starring Sasikala and in Senthilnathan's Idhuthanda Sattam. He then starred in the action film Suriyan, directed by Pavithran and it became his first big break. The film won positive reviews and became highly successful at the box office; he received a Cinema Express Award Best Actor Special Award for the role in which he shaved his head. Subsequently, Sarathkumar was catapulted to fame, his fan base was growing exponentially and he became selective in accepting new assignments. Soon, he was in competition with "Puratchi Kalaignar" Vijayakanth. In the end of 1992, he acted in the action film Thai Mozhi, co-starring Vijayakanth and Mohini, Ellaichami, Manoj Kumar's Samundi and Senthilnathan's Natchathira Nayagan, making their fifth and last collaboration. Thai Mozhi was released to mixed reviews and Samundi, despite unfavourable reviews, managed to run for more than 100 days. In the start of 1993, he acted in Aadhityan, co-starring Sukanya and Pandiarajan and in Dasarathan, produced by Mani Ratnam and S. Sriram. Aadhityan was released to negative reviews, while the much-hyped Dasarathan failed at the box office.

In mid-1993, he starred in Suresh Krissna's Vedan, co-starring Khushbu, in Munarivippu alongside Heera Rajagopal and in his fourth collaboration with director K. S. Ravikumar; Band Master, again with Heera Rajagopal and Ranjitha. Band Masterreleased to negative reviews, whereas Munarivippu was well received critically. In the end of 1993, he acted in the thriller film Moondravadhu Kann, he teamed up with the Suriyan team (consisting of director Pavithran, cinematographer Ashok Kumar, comedian Goundamani, villain Babu Antony and the editor duo B. Lenin and V. T. Vijayan) for the second time in I Love India and worked in the comedy film Kattabomman. Moondravadhu Kann was a hit at the box office and Kattabomman was labelled as a "disaster", but Malini Mannath of The New Indian Express stated that "Sarath seems to have improved on his expressions". His 1992 Telugu film Agreement was dubbed into Tamil as Idhayam Ullavan and fetched highly negative reviews upon release. Malini Mannath criticised his choice of scripts and films.

=== 1994–1999: Breakthrough and success ===
In the start of 1994, he worked in Aranmanai Kaavalan and in the Telugu film Captain, directed by Kodi Ramakrishna. Aranmanai Kaavalan was released to positive reviews while Captain was released to largely negative reviews and failed at the box office. In mid-1994, he played three roles in Namma Annachi and in Manoj Kumar's masala film Raja Pandi, he played a cameo appearance, as himself in the comedy film Killadi Mappillai and he appeared in a guest role for Pavithran's film Indhu. Namma Annachi and Rajapandi were released to unfavourable reviews. K. Vijiyan of New Straits Times stated for Namma Annachi: "to do all three roles is just to generate more publicity for Sarath and the movie". His next venture was K. S. Ravikumar's Nattamai, alongside Meena and Khushbu, in which he played a dual role. The film became a blockbuster and achieved cult status. His performance was highly praised by critics and also fetched him several notable awards, including Tamil Nadu State Film Award for Best Actor, Filmfare Award for Best Actor and Cinema Express Award for Best Actor. It was followed by Magudikkaran in which he appeared in a guest appearance. After the failure of Captain and the success of Nattamai, R. Sarathkumar decided to focus only on Tamil cinema. The next year, he worked in the village drama Veluchami, P. Vasu's Coolie, Nadodi Mannan and the crime film Ragasiya Police. Veluchami opened to favourable reviews with K. Vijiyan of New Straits Times claiming that "Sarathkumar shows more maturity with his acting". The four films were commercial failures. In 1996, he acted in A. Venkatesh's first film Mahaprabhu. The film turned out to be a hit. He then starred in the action film Nethaji, alongside Lisa Ray; the film was a failure at the box office.

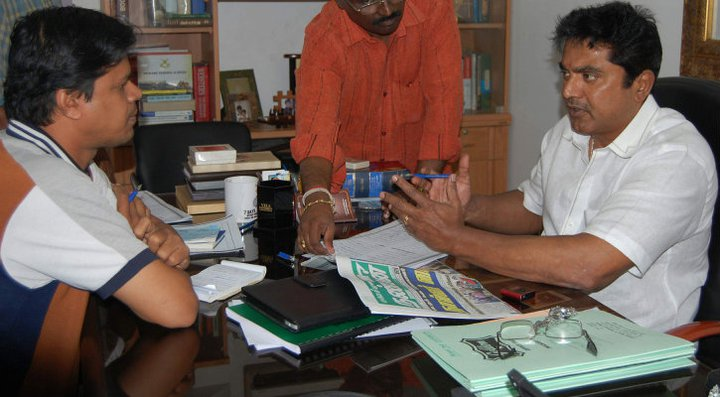
Sarathkumar with Shaik Mydeen

In 1997, he acted in Aravindhan, co-starring R. Parthiepan, Nagma and Urvashi. The film failed at the box office. His next venture Suryavamsam, directed by Vikraman and produced by R. B. Choudary was a blockbuster. He played a dual role in the film. He won the Filmfare Award for Best Actor in Tamil and Cinema Express Award for Best Actor for the second time. In the end of 1997, he acted in the Sundar C comedy film Janakiraman which was a commercial hit. The next year, he played in Moovendhar, directed by Suraj, Sundar C's assistant director. The film, released to negative reviews, failed at the box office. After Nattamai, he re-teamed with K. S. Ravikumar in Natpukkaga, the film was well received critically and turned out to be a blockbuster. R. Sarathkumar won the Filmfare Award for Best Actor for the third time and the Tamil Nadu State Film Award for Best Actor for the second time. He made a cameo appearance in Vikraman's Unnidathil Ennai Koduthen. He then starred in the Telugu film Preminchanu Nene and in Simmarasi, directed by Erode Soundar, K. S. Ravikumar's former dialogue writer. Simmarasi was released to unfavourable reviews, but Sarathkumar was praised for his role. In the start of 1999, he acted in R. Chandra's Chinna Durai, co-starring with Roja. It was followed by Oruvan, the remake of the Telugu film Auto Driver, in which Sarathkumar paired with Pooja Batra and teamed up for the second time with the director Suresh Krissna. In the end of 1999, he acted in K. S. Ravikumar's Paattali.

=== 2000–2008: Experimentation in various roles ===
In 2000, he starred in Super Good Films, Maayi and made a guest appearance in Pennin Manathai Thottu. Despite facing controversy, Maayi proved to be successful at the box office with a reviewer citing that "In the title role of a totally underplayed character, Sarathkumar surely makes a mark". In the start of 2001, he acted in the action film Rishi and went on to appear as himself in Ullam Kollai Poguthae, both directed by Sundar C. He co-starred with Vikram in Vinnukum Mannukum, directed by Rajakumaran and produced by R. B. Choudary. The film, released after many troubles and eventually failed at the box office. He then acted in S. A. Chandrasekhar's Dosth. His next release was K. S. Ravikumar's family drama Samudhiram; he acted alongside Murali and Manoj Bharathiraja. Despite negative reviews, the film was a commercial success. The next year, he appeared in Thenkasi Pattanam, alongside Napoleon and Samasthanam, alongside Malayalam actor Suresh Gopi, both were two hero-subjects. Sarathkumar's first 2003 release was Arasu, directed by Suresh, and the film was successful at the box office. However, his second film Paarai, a remake of the Malayalam film Mahayanam, directed by K. S. Ravikumar was an average grosser. His third film was Diwan, directed by Suryaprakash, who previously directed the successful Maayi. His performance was praised by critics. In the start of 2004, he acted in the action films Chatrapathy and Gambeeram; both were average grosser. In the making for the last five years, Maanasthan was released to average reviews. His next venture Aai, in which he co-starred with Namitha and Vadivelu, an action masala film, directed by A. Venkatesh, was a decent hit. He was also introduced as a playback singer in Aai.

In 2005, he starred in Hari's Ayya, alongside newcomer Nayanthara. The film was released on the Pongal weekend to positive reviews and was successful at the box office. Sarathkumar's performance fetched very positive reviews with a reviewer citing: "another splendid performance from Sarathkumar". He appeared in guest appearances in the Telugu film Bunny and his wife's production Jithan. The success of A. Venkatesh's Aai resulted in the film's team collaborating to make a film in a similar genre, Chanakya, which also featured Namitha and Vadivelu. The film was a hit at the box office, and marked the A. Venkatesh and Sarathkumar combination's third hit in a row.

In 2006, he directed and acted in his 100th film Thalaimagan, produced by his wife Radhika under the "Radaan Media works" banner. The film failed at the box office. The next year, he starred in Gautham Vasudev Menon's Pachaikili Muthucharam, which released to positive reviews, but ended up as an average grosser. Sarathkumar signed up for a Malayalam film, Vaitheeswaran, and a film directed by K. S. Ravikumar. He then played a cameo appearance as himself in Cheran's Maya Kannadi. Sarathkumar's last 2007 release was Nam Naadu, a remake of the Malayalam hit Lion, marking his third collaboration with director Suresh. This was his first film after he launched his own political party in Tamil Nadu. The film, released to largely negative reviews, failed at the box office. In 2008, his only release was the supernatural film Vaitheeswaran, which was released to negative reviews.

=== 2009–2014: Supporting Actor ===
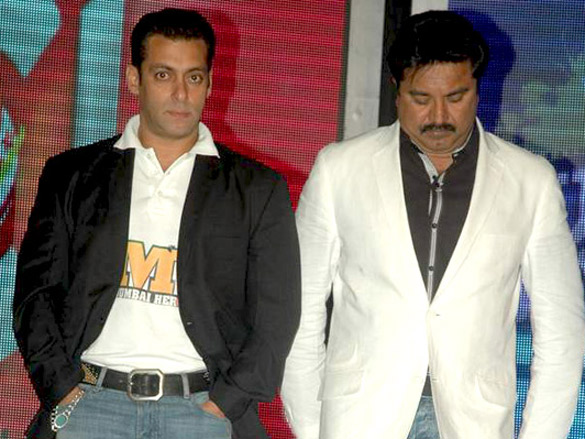
Sarathkumar with Salman Khan at CCL match, India.

In the start of 2009, he acted in the film 1977, donning six different looks. The film, made with a whopping budget of 15 crores, was directed and produced by newcomer G. N. Dinesh Kumar. The film, which released to negative reviews, took an average opening and was declared a flop at the box office. In October 2009, Sarathkumar made his debut in Malayalam through Pazhassi Raja, in which he co-starred with Mammootty and he played the role of Edachena Kunkan. The historical period film was directed by Hariharan. For the film, Sarathkumar won the Vanitha Film Awards for Best Supporting Actor. After the release of Pazhassi Raja, Sarathkumar was flooded with offers in Malayalam. Jaggubhai was released on 29 January 2010, the film, directed by K. S. Ravikumar, became the tenth collaboration between the director and the actor. The film, facing serious piracy problems before its release, bombed ultimately at the box office. He then made a guest appearance in Madhumitha's comedy film Kola Kolaya Mundhirika. In the end of 2010, he acted in the Malayalam film Oridathoru Postman, which was a flop at the box office. In early 2010, he acted in his first Malayalam film The Metro as a solo hero, which bombed at the Kerala box office. He appeared in an extended cameo in Christian Brothers, directed by Joshiy, starring alongside Mohanlal, Dileep, and Suresh Gopi. The film was a blockbuster. In mid-2011, Sarathkumar played the role of a transgender person in Raghava Lawrence's Muni 2: Kanchana. The film became a commercial success in both Tamil and Telugu, he won for his performance a Vijay Award for Best Supporting Actor.

In early 2012, he accepted Soundarya's offer for an important role in the film Kochadaiiyaan, starring Rajinikanth and Deepika Padukone. He played lead role in the Malayalam film Achante Aanmakkal as an IPS officer. He then starred in his first Kannada film Saarathi, which was a blockbuster, followed by the Telugu film Genius. The next year, he played the role of a police officer in the Kannada film Myna. His next venture was Chennaiyil Oru Naal, a remake of the Malayalam hit film Traffic and co-produced by his wife Radhika Sarathkumar, in which he played the role of a traffic police commissioner. The film became a critical and commercial success. He then appeared in the Telugu film Chandee, playing the role of a police officer. In the beginning of 2014, he played the role of a CBI officer in Nimirndhu Nil and Janda Pai Kapiraju, which were shot simultaneously in Tamil and Telugu. He then appeared in "India's first photorealistic performance capture film" Kochadaiiyaan, co-starring Rajinikanth and Deepika Padukone. The film is followed by Malayalam film, Asha Black and was simultaneously released in Tamil as Nee Naan Nizhal.

=== 2015–present ===
In 2015, he appeared in a cameo appearance in I directed by S. Shankar, and his next Sandamarutham in dual roles, directed by A. Venkatesh while Sarathkumar wrote the story and the screenplay was by written crime novelist Rajeshkumar. Then he starred in the Telugu film Janda Pai Kapiraju. He interprets the role of Sikandar Lodi in the Kannada film Santheyalli Nintha Kabira. Sarath kumar accumulates films in second roles like Nenorakam (2017), Raajakumara (2017), Jaya Janaki Nayaka (2017). He made his comeback in Tamil cinema as the main lead in the thriller film, Chennaiyil Oru Naal 2 (2017), a spirit sequel to the 2013 Chennaiyil Oru Naal. As reviewed by sify.com, "Sarathkumar is the only saving grace, he looks perfect as a stylish police officer and the actor is the main reason to watch the film until the end". For the Hindu press, "this is a role that he can perform in his sleep. The film opened to mostly negative reviews. In 2018, he starred in a series of Telugu action movies like Naa Peru Surya, Bharat Ane Nenu, Saakshyam and Devadas. In 2019, he acted in the Kannada movie Seetharama Kalyana. In 2020, Vaanam Kottattum from Dhana and Mani Ratnam is a neat family entertainer with some good emotional moments and memorable performance. He starred in pivotal supporting character Periya Pazhuvettaraiyar from Ponniyin Selvan: I (2022) of filmmaker Mani Ratnam. He played a father character in family entertainer Varisu (2023). The second part of the historic epic drama Ponniyin Selvan: II (2023) was released to massive opening. He also did key roles in movies like Custody (2023) and Rangabali (2023) to expand his fan base in Telugu. Tamil crime thrillers Por Thozhil (2023) and Paramporul (2023) were both commercial successes. He also seen in the Malayalam film Bandra (2023). Sarathkumar's starred in The Smile Man (2024), which received positive reviews from the audience, who praised the actor's performance in a captivating and unique role. In 2025, the film 3BHK is positioned as a relatable family drama that combines heartfelt performances with strong writing and direction.

== Political career ==
=== 1994-1995 ===
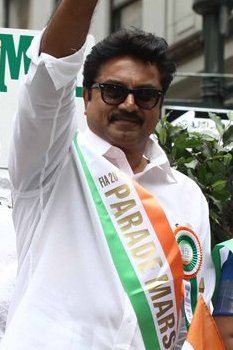
Sarathkumar in 2013

In his early days as an actor, R. Sarathkumar was considered to be close to All India Anna Dravida Munnetra Kazhagam (AIADMK) supremo Jayalalithaa. The film Nattamai (1994), which was still running in Tamil Nadu theatres, was aired by Jayalalithaa's television channel JJ TV, using a videotape which Sarathkumar gave her for personal viewing at her residence. This caused concern in the film industry, and producer R. B. Choudary threatened action against Sarathkumar for misusing a tape given to him for personal viewing.

Sarathkumar later joined hands with Rajinikanth, who supported the Dravida Munnetra Kazhagam (DMK) – Tamil Maanila Congress (TMC) alliance.

=== 1996-2006 ===
In 1996, Sarath Kumar formally entered politics, joining the Dravida Munnetra Kazhagam (DMK). In 1998, Sarathkumar contested the Lok Sabha elections from Tirunelveli. He was defeated by Kadambur R. Janarthanan of the AIADMK by a margin of 6,904 votes, and the DPA managed to win 9 seats.

In July 2001, the party made him a Rajya Sabha member, but he resigned before the 2006 Assembly elections to join the AIADMK along with his wife Radhika. In October 2006, his wife Radhika was dismissed from AIADMK for anti-party activities. He also quit AIADMK in November 2006, quoting that his role as president of the South Indian Artistes' Association needed "undivided attention".

=== 2007–present ===
Sarathkumar launched his own political party the All India Samathuva Makkal Katchi on 31 August 2007. Sarathkumar said: "We are disillusioned by the Dravidian parties, which had done little to develop the state despite being in power for four decades". Just before 2011 Assembly elections, Sarathkumar joined the AIADMK alliance and his party was allotted two seats. His party contested as part of the AIADMK alliance and won in two assembly constituencies – Tenkasi and Nanguneri. Sarathkumar won from Tenkasi and Ernavur A. Narayanan won from Nanguneri. In January 2016, Ernavur A. Narayanan was expelled from the party for not abiding by the party rules and indulging in anti-party activities. In the 2016 Assembly elections, Sarath Kumar lost in Tiruchendur Constituency to DMK Candidate Anitha R. Radhakrishnan. In November 2017, Sarathkumar said in an interview for The Hindu: "For the last 10 years, I have been closely associated with AIADMK. In fact, I have even been identified as the party's propaganda secretary. Though I don't regret this identification, my party couldn't grow. Now, I want to focus on my party and be seen as a possible Chief Minister candidate". He merged his All India Samathuva Makkal Katchi with the Bharatiya Janata Party on 12 March 2024, at Chennai.

== Legal issues ==
=== Cheque bounce case ===
In 2014, Radiance Media Private Ltd. filed a petition claiming that Magic Frames, a company where Sarathkumar and his wife Radhika are partners, borrowed ₹1.50 crore and later Sarathkumar took an additional loan of ₹50 lakhs in an agreement that the amount would be returned by March 2015. In 2017, Radiance media alleged that Magic Frames issued seven cheques as repayment and all of the cheques bounced for which seven cases were filed. In 2019, the Madras High Court had declined to quash the criminal proceedings in the pending cases after the couple moved the high court to quash them. Sarathkumar and Radhika were convicted in the case by the Special Court on 7 April 2021. The court sentenced them to one year in prison and a fine of ₹3.3 crore. On the same day Sarathkumar, received relief from the court for the sentence and the court issued arrest warrant to his wife Radhika since she had not appeared in court.

=== Income tax raid ===
In April 2017, Income Tax officers raided Sarathkumar, Tamil Nadu Health Minister C Vijayabaskar and others in relation to accusations of bribing voters in the RK Nagar by-election, which was held following the death of J. Jayalalithaa. A day before the Income Tax raids, Sarathkumar's party, AISMK, declared its support for TTV Dinakaran, the candidate endorsed by V. K Sasikala. The Hindu, citing I-T department sources, had reported that Sarathkumar allegedly received Rs 7 crore from Vijayabaskar, with WhatsApp messages confirming the transaction. In April and May 2017, the IT department recorded Sarathkumar and his daughter Rayane's sworn statements, in which they confessed to acquiring Rs 2 crore from controversial businessman J. Sekar Reddy in May 2016. According to the records, Sarathkumar stated that the transaction hadn't been documented in the books and that he found out about it while campaigning in Tiruchendur. He told the IT department that the payment had been received by his daughter, who subsequently notified his employees. Additionally, he stated that the Rs 2 crore was to be used for acting and film production, and that he would report it as income for the 2016-17 financial year and pay the required taxes promptly. Four days after the Income Tax Department raided Sarathkumar's home, Income Tax officers raided his wife Radikaa Sarathkumar's production company, Radaan Mediaworks, in Chennai.

== Electoral career ==
=== Lok Sabha Elections Contested ===
Elections	Constituency	Party	Result	Vote percentage	Opposition Candidate	Opposition Party	Opposition vote percentage	Reference
1998 Indian general election	Tirunelveli	DMK	Lost	40.29	M. R. Kadambur Janarthanan	AIADMK	41.44	

=== Rajya Sabha Elections Contested ===
Year	Election	Party	PC Name	Result
2001	Rajya Sabha	DMK	Tamil Nadu	Won

=== Tamil Nadu Legislative Assembly Election ===
Elections	Constituency	Party	Result	Vote percentage	Opposition Candidate	Opposition Party	Opposition vote percentage	Reference
2011 Tamil Nadu Legislative Assembly election	Tenkasi	AISMK	Won	54.30	Karuppasamy Pandian	DMK	40.78	
2016 Tamil Nadu Legislative Assembly election	Tiruchendur	AIADMK	Lost	37.38	Anitha R. Radhakrishnan	DMK	52.97	

== Journalism career ==
After finishing his studies, Sarathkumar started out as a newspaper boy, managing newspaper circulation before moving on to become a reporter. After establishing Dinakaran in Bangalore, he was called to Chennai to expand their business there.

Sarathkumar is now the founder and editor of Media Voice weekly magazine in Tamil. One of the key value propositions that Media Voice brings to the table is Sarath's personal interview each month with a news-maker discussing current issues. "Although I am a politician and actor now, the journalist in me is still alive. I love multitasking", said Sarath. The Hindu states: From such humble beginnings, he has learnt to live an inspired life, and is the strong leader that society needs.

== Personal life ==
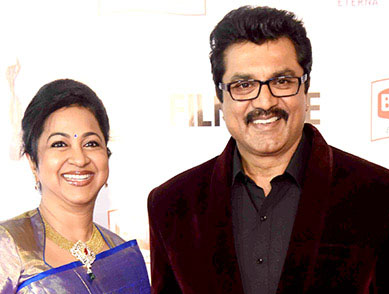
Sarathkumar with his wife Radhika at the 62nd Filmfare Awards South in 2015

R. Sarathkumar has been married twice. His first marriage was with Chaya Devi in 1984 and the couple had two daughters, Varalaxmi (born 1985) and Pooja (born 1987). Varalaxmi is an actress in the South Indian film industry.

While still married to Chaya, Sarathkumar had a highly publicised affair with actress Nagma during the mid-1990s. Sarathkumar and Chaya got divorced in 2000.

Sarathkumar married actress Radhika in 2001. They were friends when they worked together in Kargil, they also paired in two films: Namma Annachi and Suryavamsam. The couple has a son named Rahul, who was born in 2004. He has also a stepdaughter, Rayanne Hardy, who was born to his wife Radhika with her ex-husband, Richard Hardy, in 1992. She married cricketer Abhimanyu Mithun, on 28 August 2016.

== Awards ==
Honours

- Kalaimamani (1993)

Tamil Nadu State Film Awards

- 1994 – Tamil Nadu State Film Award for Best Actor for Nattamai
- 1996 – M.G.R. Award
- 1998 – Tamil Nadu State Film Award for Best Actor – Natpukkaga / Simmarasi

Filmfare Awards South

- 1994 – Filmfare Award for Best Tamil Actor – Nattamai
- 1997 – Filmfare Award for Best Tamil Actor – Suryavamsam
- 1998 – Filmfare Award for Best Tamil Actor – Natpukkaga

Cinema Express Award

- 1990 – Cinema Express Award for Best Villain – Tamil – Pulan Visaranai
- 1992 – Cinema Express Award Special Prize for Best Actor – Suriyan
- 1994 – Cinema Express Award for Best Actor – Nattamai
- 1997 – Cinema Express Award for Best Actor – Suryavamsam
- 2000 – Chevalier Sivaji Ganesan Award

Other awards

- 1997 – Dinakaran Cinema Best Actor Award – Suryavamsam
- 1997 – Cinema Fans' Association Best Actor Award – Suryavamsam
- 2005 – Sivaji Ganesan Awards
- 2006 – MGR – Sivaji Awards – Thalaimagan
- 2009 – Asianet Film Awards Special Jury Award – Pazhassi Raja
- 2009 – Vanitha Film Awards for Best Supporting Actor – Pazhassi Raja
- 2009 – Sathyan Memorial Film Awards for Best Supporting Actor – Pazhassi Raja
- 2009 – Jai Hind Patriotic Pride Award – Pazhassi Raja
- 2009 – Mathrubhumi Amrita Special Jury Award – Pazhassi Raja
- 2011 – SIIMA Award for Best Supporting Actor – Muni 2: Kanchana
- 2011 – Vijay Award for Best Supporting Actor – Muni 2: Kanchana
- 2013 – Rainbow Ambassador Award
- 2013 – Norway Tamil Film Festival Icon of Tamil Cinema Award
- 2019 – SIIMA Award for Best Actor in a Negative Role – Telugu for Naa Peru Surya
