= Thangamana Thangachi =

- Directed by: Senthilnathan
- Written by: K. Rajan
- Produced by: K. R. Prabhu; K. R. Ganesh; K. R. Suresh
- Starring: R. Sarathkumar; Meenakshi
- Cinematography: M. Kesavan
- Edited by: J. Elango
- Music by: Shankar–Ganesh
- Production company: Ganesh Cine Arts
- Release date: 15 January 1991
- Running time: 120 minutes
- Country: India
- Language: Tamil

Thangamana Thangachi (transl. Precious sister) is a 1991 Indian Tamil-language drama film directed by Senthilnathan. The film stars R. Sarathkumar and Aamani (credited as Meenakshi) while Mansoor Ali Khan, Ragapriya, Jai Ganesh, Senthil, and K. R. Ganesh, among others, appear in supporting roles. It was released on 15 January 1991.

== Plot ==
Vijay and Seetha are siblings. After their mother's death, Vijay worked hard to come up in life. He brought up his sister alone. Many years later, Vijay becomes a taxi driver. Seetha falls in love with the postman Kannan, while Vijay is in love with his childhood lover Lakshmi. Lakshmi is the daughter of the corrupt politician Marappan, and her brother rapes the young girls as he wishes. At Seetha's wedding, Lakshmi's brother kidnaps Seetha and then rapes and brutally kills her. Vijay decides to take revenge.

== Cast ==
- R. Sarathkumar as Vijay
- Meenakshi as Lakshmi
- Mansoor Ali Khan as Lakshmi's brother
- Ragapriya as Seetha
- Jai Ganesh as Marappan
- Senthil
- Shanmugasundaram
- K. R. Ganesh as Kannan
- Sonia as Geetha
- Kamala Kamesh as Meenakshi
- Vennira Aadai Moorthy as Kottapatti Kunjithapatham
- Loose Mohan
- K. Natraj
- Senthilnathan
- K. R. Prabhu as Prabhu
- Chitraguptan as Kili
- Vijayachandrika
- V. R. Thilagam
- Vimalraja
- Sivaraman
- Chithra
- Mary
- Vellai Subbaiah
- K. Rajan as Paramasivam
- Master Tinku as Vijay (young)
- Baby Sujitha as Lakshmi (young)

== Soundtrack ==
The music was composed by Shankar–Ganesh, with lyrics written by Kalidasan.

Song	Singer(s)	Duration
"Chinnachiru Ponmane"	Minmini	5:02
"Kalyaana Ponne" (happy)	Mano	4:15
"Kalyaana Ponne" (sad)	Prabhakar	0:36
"Vaaya Katti Vayatha Katti"	Swarnalatha	4:20
"Vaanam Paadikootame"	Minmini	3:51

== Reception ==
C. R. K. of Kalki wrote a review as a conversation between a husband and wife narrating the story and characters.
