= Radikaa Sarathkumar =

Indian actress, film producer, film director, politician (born 1962)

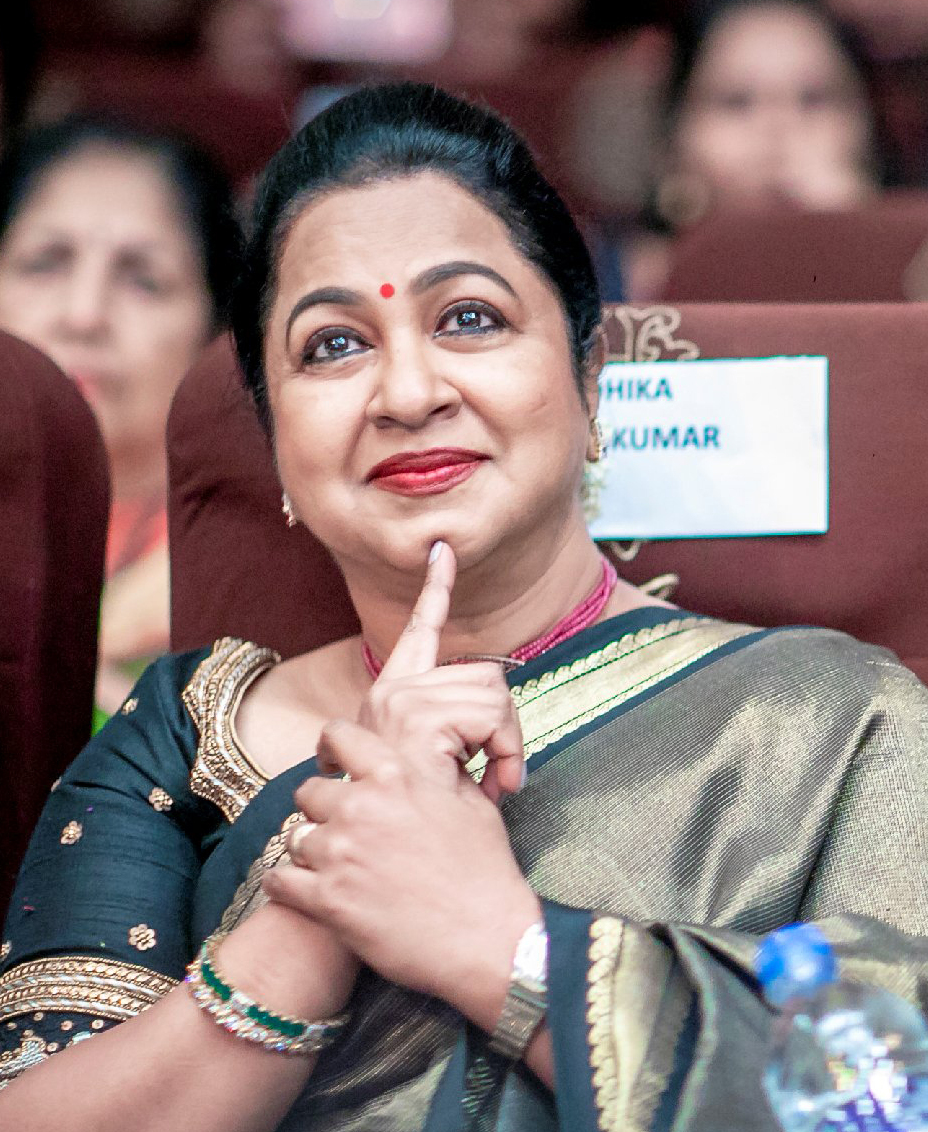
- Radikaa at Vaanam Kottatum Audio Launch

Primary Deputy General Secretary of the All India Samathuva Makkal Katchi
- In office 3 March 2021 – 12 March 2024
- President: R. Sarathkumar
- Succeeded by: Position abolished

Personal details
- Born: 21 August 1962 (age 64)
- Party: Bharatiya Janata Party (2024‍–‍present)
- Other political affiliations: AISMK (2007‍–‍2024); AIADMK (2006-2007); DMK (1990‍–‍2005)
- Spouses: Pratap Pothan (m. 1985; div. 1986); Richard Hardy (m. 1990; div. 1992); R. Sarathkumar (m. 2001)
- Children: 2
- Parent: M. R. Radha (father)
- Relatives: Radha family
- Occupation: Actress; film producer; film director; politician
- Awards: National Film Award; Filmfare Award for Best Actress; Tamil Nadu State Film Award; Cinema Express Award; Nandi Award

Radikaa Sarathkumar (/rɑːðɪkɑː/) is an Indian actress, film producer, film director and politician who works predominantly in Tamil and Telugu cinema, TV serials and web series as well as in Hindi, Malayalam and Kannada films. She is a recipient of a National Film Award, two Nandi Awards, three Tamil Nadu State Film Awards and six Filmfare Award South.

== Personal life ==
Radikaa is the daughter of actor M. R. Radha and Geetha. She is half-Indian and half-Tamil Her father is a Telugu from Chennai and her mother is a Tamil from Sri Lanka, native of Wennappuwa. Radikaa did her education in India, Sri Lanka and a course in London, which she discontinued. She has a younger sister Nirosha, who is also an actress and two younger brothers, Raju and Mohan. She also has two half-brothers Radha Ravi and M. R. R. Vasu.

Radikaa married actor Sarathkumar on 4 February 2001. They had been friends before their marriage and had been paired in two films: Namma Annachi (1994) and Suryavamsam (1997). The couple has a son named Rahul born in 2004.

Radikaa also has a daughter, Rayanne born in 1992, from her second husband, Richard Hardy. Rayanne married cricketer Abhimanyu Mithun in 2016. Radikaa has a grandson and a granddaughter.

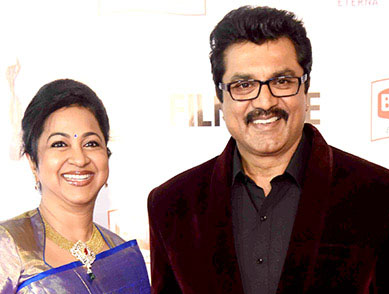
Radhika with her husband at the 62nd Filmfare Awards South in 2015

== Film career ==
Radikaa made her cinematic debut in the 1978 Tamil movie Kizhakke Pogum Rail after accidentally meeting Bharathiraja. Thereafter, she acted in several Tamil, Telugu, Kannada, Hindi and Malayalam films.

Through the late 1970s and the entire 1980s, Radikaa Sarathkumar was one of the busiest leading ladies in South Indian cinema.

She has also produced a film titled Meendum Oru Kaathal Kathai (1985), which won the Indira Gandhi Award for Best Debut Film of a Director.

She was awarded Best Telugu Actress for Nyayam Kavali (1981), Best Tamil Actress for Dharma Devathai (1986), Neethikku Thandanai (1987) and Keladi Kanmani (1990).

In 1994, she started a TV film production under her own banner, Radaan Mediaworks, in which she produced several TV serials hits, and also played a leading role.

She produced serials such as Idi Katha Kadu (Telugu), Chitti, Annamalai, Selvi, Arasi, Chellamay, Vani Rani, Thamarai and Chithi 2.

She was a judge on Vijay TV's Jodi Number One Season 4.

In September 2019, she was awarded as "Nadigavel Selvi" during audio launch of Market Raja MBBS.

== Political career ==
She joined the AIADMK before the 2006 Assembly elections along with her husband R. Sarathkumar. On 18 October 2006, she was dismissed from AIADMK for anti-party activities. She was the vice-president of All India Samathuva Makkal Katchi from 2007 until recently when she tendered her resignation.

In the 2024 Indian general election, Radhika contested as the BJP candidate from the Virudhunagar Lok Sabha constituency. She lost the election and finished third. Vijaya Prabhakaran (son of Late Vijayakanth) finished with 214,606 votes higher than Radhika.

== Legal issues ==
=== Cheque bounce case ===
In 2014, Radiance Media Private Ltd. filed a petition claiming that Magic Frames, a company where Radhika and her husband Sarathkumar are partners, borrowed ₹1.50 crore and later her husband Sarathkumar took an additional loan of ₹50 lakhs in an agreement that the amount would be returned by March 2015. In 2017, Radiance media alleged that Magic Frames issued seven cheques as repayment and all of the cheques bounced for which seven cases were filed. In 2019, the Madras High Court had declined to quash the criminal proceedings in the pending cases after the couple moved the high court to quash them. Radikaa and Sarathkumar were convicted in the case by the Special Court on 7 April 2021. The court sentenced them to one year in prison and a fine of ₹3.3 crore. On the same day, her husband, Sarathkumar, received relief from the court for the sentence and the court issued arrest warrant to Radikaa since she had not appeared in court.

=== Income tax raid ===
The Income Tax department conducted a raid on Radaan Mediaworks India Limited, a media company owned by Radikaa Sarathkumar, in Chennai on 11 April 2017, days after the department interrogated her husband Sarathkumar and searched his house.

== Awards and nominations ==
Year	Award	Award category	Work	Result	Reference
1981	Filmfare Awards South	Best Actress – Telugu	Nyayam Kavali	Won	
1985	National Film Awards	Producer	Meendum Oru Kaathal Kathai	Won	
1986	Filmfare Awards South	Best Actress – Tamil	Dharma Devathai	Won	
1987	Filmfare Awards South	Best Actress – Tamil	Neethikku Thandanai	Won	
1987	Nandi Awards	Best Supporting Actress	Karthika Pournami	Won	
1988	Cinema Express Awards	Best Actress	Paasa Paravaigal & Poonthotta Kaavalkaaran	Won	
1988	Tamil Nadu State Film Awards	Special Award	Poonthotta Kaavalkaaran	Won	
1989	Tamil Nadu State Film Awards	Best Actress	Ninaivu Chinnam	Won	
1990	Filmfare Awards South	Best Actress – Tamil	Keladi Kanmani	Won	
1993	Cinema Express Awards	Best Actress	Kizhakku Cheemayile	Won	
1995	Tamil Nadu State Film Awards	Special Award for Best Actress	Pasumpon, Rani Maharani	Won	
1999	Nandi Awards	Best Supporting Actress	Prema Kadha	Won	
2008	Vivel Chinnathirai Award	Best Actress	Arasi	Won	
2010	Sun Kudumbam Viruthugal	Best Overall Performance Award	Arasi	Won	
2012	Sun Kudumbam Viruthugal	Special Jury Award for Best Actress	Chellamay	Won	
2014	Sun Kudumbam Viruthugal	Best Actress	Vani Rani	Won	
2014	Filmfare Awards South	Lifetime Achievement Award – South	Overall Contribution to Tamil Cinema	Won	
2015	Filmfare Awards South	Best Supporting Actress – Tamil	Thanga Magan	Won	
2015	South Indian International Movie Awards	Best Actress in a Supporting Role	Thanga Magan	Won	
2016	Provoke Lifestyle Awards	TV Sensation of the Year	Various Serials	Won	

== Elections contested and positions held ==
=== Lok Sabha elections ===
Elections	Lok Sabha	Constituency	Political party	Result	Vote percentage	Opposition		
Elections	Lok Sabha	Constituency	Political party	Result	Vote percentage	Candidate	Political party	Vote percentage
2024	18th	Virudhunagar	BJP	Lost	15.66%	B. Manickam Tagore	INC	36.28%
