= Kaaval Nilayam =

- Poster
- Directed by: Senthilnathan
- Written by: Senthilnathan; S. Gajendra Kumar (dialogues)
- Produced by: F. C. Vijayakumar
- Starring: Sarathkumar; Anandaraj
- Cinematography: M. Kesavan
- Edited by: J. Elango
- Music by: Shankar–Ganesh
- Production company: Vijaykumari Films
- Release date: 11 May 1991
- Running time: 125 minutes
- Country: India
- Language: Tamil

Kaaval Nilayam (transl. Police Station) is a 1991 Indian Tamil language crime film directed by Senthilnathan. The film stars Sarathkumar and Anandaraj. It was released on 11 May 1991, and ran for 100 days in theatres.

== Plot ==
Raja, a rowdy, escapes from police officers and is accommodated by a prostitute. Vijay, an honest police officer, is transferred to a new area. Vijay lives happily with his wife Aarthi and his daughter Sowmiya. Soon, Raja crosses Vijay's path.

In the past, Raja and Vijay were friends. Raja, Vijay and Aarthi trained hard to become police officers. While Raja was an orphan, Vijay was from a police family. The honest police officer Ravi, Vijay's brother, clashed with the corrupt politician Andhavar and he was killed by Andhavar. Andhavar's son is involved in drugging and filming young women. Vijay and Raja took different ways to fight against Andhavar.

== Cast ==
- Sarath Kumar as Inspector Vijay
- Anandaraj as Raja
- M. N. Nambiar as Andhavar
- Gautami as Aarthi
- Jaishankar as Ravi
- K. R. Vijaya as Ravi's wife
- Janagaraj as Murali
- Senthil as Harichandran
- Charuhasan
- V. Gopalakrishnan as D.G.P Gopalakrishnan
- Delhi Ganesh
- Shanmugasundaram
- Ajay Rathnam as Andhavar's son
- Idichapuli Selvaraj as Selvaraj
- M.L.A Thangaraj as Pichakannu
- Kamala Kamesh as Murali's mother
- Baby Sowmiya as Sowmiya

== Soundtrack ==
The music was composed by Shankar–Ganesh, with lyrics written by Vaali, Muthulingam, Piraisoodan and Shankar–Ganesh.

Song	Singer(s)	Lyrics	Duration
"Gnyama"	Janagaraj	Piraisoodan	4:45
"Maaman Vetti"	Mano	Shankar–Ganesh	5:35
"One Two Three"	Mano, K. S. Chithra	Vaali	5:29
"Singakutti Neeye"	P. Susheela, Suja Radhakrishnan	Muthulingam	4:32
