= K. Natraj =

Indian actor and director (born 1949)

- Born: 30 November 1949 (age 76)
- Occupations: Director, actor, screenwriter
- Years active: 1976–1998; 2004–Present

K. Natraj is an Indian actor and director who primarily worked in Tamil-language films and serials.

== Personal life ==
In film industry circle, he is popular as a close friend of actor Rajinikanth. His daughter, Rajini, was married to actor Vishnu Vishal from 2011 to 2018.

== Career ==
Producer Azhagan Thamizhmani and writer Thooyavan saw a film called Touched by Love which had Elvis Presley in a guest appearance at a film festival, both got emotional while watching the film which prompted them to attempt a similar story in Tamil. Thooyavan finished screenplay within a month. He wanted to cast the late MGR as the hero but couldn't do so. Thooyavan narrated the story to K. Natraj who was working as one of the assistant directors in Devar films. K. Natraj agreed to work on the film and Rajini accepted to act in this film. Rajini initially agreed to give callsheet of 6 days then extended for 10 days since he wanted the film to come out well. The film was entirely shot in a school with 300 students. Rajkumar Sethupathi, brother of actress Latha and husband of actress Sripriya did a small role as Ambika's husband. Meena appeared as one of the main characters. On 3 August 1984 The Hindu said, "For one making his debut as director Natraj deserves accolades for the near-to-the-heart treatment of the situations in which the performance of a six-member-group of orphans will make even elder artistes sit up" and concluded, "Babu's camera embellishes the frames".

K. Natraj, Rajinikanth's friend from the film institute who earlier directed Anbulla Rajinikanth was approached by Rajini to take part as an assistant director in Annaamalai to which Natraj gladly accepted. Then Rajini approached his friends and announced that he would like to make a film for them. The script of "Valli" was written by Rajini himself. Priyaraman made her debut as heroine while Hariraj and Sanjay were introduced in this film. Rajini was not interested to appear in cameo appearance but with insistence of his friends he accepted to do small role and finished his portions within five days.

Shooting was started in April 1993. This was also debut film of magician Alex as actor. The filming was held at Chalakudi, Pollachi and Red Hills. Hari, director of Saamy and Singam was one of the assistants in this film.

== Filmography ==
=== As director ===
Year	Title	Notes
1984	Anbulla Rajinikanth	
1985	Selvi	
1985	Irandu Manam	
1986	Thalaiyatti Bommaigal	
1987	Chellakutti	
1993	Valli	

=== As actor ===
Year	Title	Role	Notes
1976	Moondru Mudichu		
1978	Bairavi		
1978	Priya		
1978	Nizhal Nijamagiradhu	Ayyavu	
1980	Maria My Darling		
1980	Ullasa Paravaigal	Rajagopal	
1980	Oli Pirandhathu		
1981	Ranuva Veeran		
1982	Moondram Pirai		
1983	Thai Veedu		
1984	Naan Mahaan Alla	Henchman	
1984	Nalla Naal		
1987	Cooliekkaran	David	
1988	Guru Sishyan	Soloman	
1988	Katha Nayagan		
1990	Palaivana Paravaigal	Kannayiram	
1990	Pudhu Varisu		
1991	Thangamana Thangachi		
1992	Idhuthanda Sattam	Dharma	
1997	Thambi Durai		
1998	Unnidathil Ennai Koduthen		
1999	Manaivikku Mariyadhai		
2006	Aadhikkam		
2014	Lingaa		
2017	Katha Nayagan		

== Television ==
Year	Title	Role	Channel
2004–2007	Kalki	Director	Jaya TV
2008–2009	Kolangal	Anthony	Sun TV
2009–2010	Magal	Pandian	Sun TV
2010–2011	Madhavi	Vazhavanthan	Sun TV
2011-2013	Thangam	Muthaiyyah	Sun TV
2011–2013	7C	Principal	Star Vijay
2012–2014	Paartha Gnabagam Illayo		Kalaignar TV
2013–2014	Thaayumanavan		Vijay TV
2014–2016	Andal Azhagar	Chidambaram	Vijay TV
2016–2019	Pagal Nilavu	Chidambaram	Vijay TV
2017–2019	Rekka Katti Parakkudhu Manasu	Arun's Grandfather	Zee Tamil
2018–2022	Roja	Shanthamurthy	Sun TV
2019	Kadaikutty Singam	Muthuramalingam (Ayya)	Star Vijay
2019–2020	Siva Manasula Sakthi	Ramamoorthy	Star Vijay
2019	Dum Dum Dum	Pazhavesam Thatha	Kalaignar TV
2020–2022	Velaikaran		Star Vijay
2021	Sathya 2		Zee Tamil
