= Bayilvan Ranganathan =

Indian comedian and actor

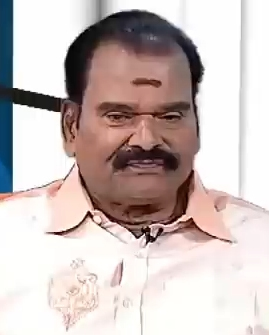
- Born: Siruthondainallor, Province of Madras, India
- Years active: 1973-present

Bayilvan Ranganathan is an Indian actor, comedian, YouTuber, journalist and social media influencer who predominantly featured in comedy and villainous negative shade roles in Tamil films.

== Biography ==
Bayilvan was born in Siruthondainallor of Thoothukudi district, Province of Madras (now Tamil Nadu).

He was nicknamed as Bayilvan by former actor and chief minister of Tamil Nadu M. G. Ramachandran indicating his body posture, bodyweight and bulk physique. Since then it had become his stage name and later Bayilvan became an adjective to his original name.

== Career ==
He was interested in the aspect of weightlifting from his younger days and his notable achievement by winning Mr. Chennai title as a youngster spoke volume about his knack of engaging in weightlifting in a passionate manner. He eventually expected to enroll himself in Police Service as a constable which was his initial dream career and he worked towards achieving his dream job by completing his primary and secondary education as well as tertiary education at Thoothukudi.

However, he shelved his plans of becoming a police constable and ventured into journalism and eventually kickstarted his career as a newspaper editor. He eventually started writing critic review for films in newspaper articles and his first article review for a film came way back in 1973 when K. Balachander's directorial venture Arangetram had its theatrical release all across Tamil Nadu. He then plied his trade as a henchman and sidekick to main villains acting in minor roles often portraying himself in negative shades. He made his film acting debut in K. Bhagyaraj's directorial Mundhanai Mudichu (1983). It was through his exposure as a film critic at newspaper press that fetched him film acting opportunities and hence he shifted his career trajectory to acting.

He collaborated with Vadivelu in many of his films and one of the notable comedy sequences pairing both Vadivelu and Bayilvan Ranganathan came in Nesam Pudhusu (1999), where Vadivelu makes a phone call to Bayilvan to ask for money as a compensation and as a favour for having lifted Bayilvan's sister Kovai Sarala all the way to his house. His role as a bus ticket inspector in Vetri Kodi Kattu (2000) garnered him popularity despite making only a brief appearance in a special appearance.

Ranganathan lately ventured into YouTube where he makes revelations about the interesting things which he witnessed during film shooting schedules at shooting spots and sets. He also has been involved with sharing stories about the personal stories of film actors and actresses of Tamil cinema in his official YouTube handle.

== Controversies ==
He was interviewed by Malayalam actress Shakeela, where Shakeela was asking questions about why Bayilvan had been sharing and spreading gossips about actors and actresses of Tamil cinema through his official YouTube channel. Bayilvan claimed that he wanted the general audience to know the actual reality and he highlighted that his content was developed based on the gossip seeking mindset of general public. Shakeela queried on why Bayilvan was irked about the glamour and dressing sense of female actresses and in response, Bayilvan insisted that he only told what was happening in reality via his YouTube channel by referring to an example of actress Rashmika Mandanna's dressing patterns when attending celebrity events.

He was the main subject and centre of attention in the infamous Suchi Leaks where popular singer and actress Suchithra lashed out against him for his derogatory remarks about film celebrities especially indicating his publicity stunt and cheap tactics to milk views for his YouTube videos.

== Partial filmography ==
- Kilinjalgal (1981)
- Auto Raja (1982)
- Azhagiya Kanne (1982)
- Mundhanai Mudichu (1983)
- Thai Veedu (1983)
- 24 Mani Neram (1984)
- Padikkadha Pannaiyar (1985)
- Veerapandiyan (1987)
- Enga Chinna Rasa (1987)
- Velaikkaran (1987)
- Aayusu Nooru (1987)
- Oorai Therinjikitten (1988)
- Kathanayagan (1988)
- Thaimel Aanai (1988)
- Enna Petha Raasa (1989)
- Thangamani Rangamani (1989)
- Mallu Vetti Minor (1990)
- Durga (1990)
- Abhirami (1992)
- Oor Mariyadhai (1992)
- Pangali (1992)
- Pokkiri Thambi (1992)
- Rasukutty (1992)
- Aavarampoo (1992)
- Ilavarasan (1992)
- Thanga Manasukkaran (1992)
- Suriyan Chandiran (1993)
- Jaihind (1994)
- Nila (1994)
- Sakthivel (1994)
- Sevatha Ponnu (1994)
- Subramaniya Swamy (1994)
- Thamarai (1994)
- Vaanga Partner Vaanga (1994)
- Watchman Vadivel (1994)
- Chinna Mani (1995)
- Aanazhagan (1995)
- Ellame En Rasathan (1995)
- Vishnu (1995)
- Mannai Thottu Kumbidanum (1995)
- Aasai (1995)
- Jameen Kottai (1995)
- Aavathum Pennale Azhivathum Pennale (1996)
- Vasantha Vaasal (1996)
- Avvai Shanmugi (1996)
- Kaalam Maari Pochu (1996)
- Vaanmathi (1996)
- Bharathi Kannamma (1997)
- Pistha (1997)
- Vasuke (1997)
- Pagaivan (1997)
- Thambi Durai (1997)
- Vaettiya Madichu Kattu (1998)
- Rathna (1998)
- Dhinamdhorum (1998)
- Chinna Durai (1999)
- Kudumba Sangili (1999)
- Nilave Mugam Kaattu (1999)
- Nesam Pudhusu (1999)
- Pudhu Kudithanam (1999)
- Good Luck (2000)
- Pottu Amman (2000)
- Vetri Kodi Kattu (2000)
- Krishna Krishna (2001)
- Narasimha (2001)
- Engalukkum Kaalam Varum (2001)
- Kunguma Pottu Gounder (2001)
- Pammal K. Sambandam (2002)
- Thamizhan (2002) (uncredited)
- Bagavathi (2002)
- Villain (2002)
- Andipatti Arasampatti (2002)
- Shakalaka Baby (2002)
- Dum (2003)
- Punnagai Poove (2003)
- Well Done (2003)
- Indru Mudhal (2003)
- Saamy (2003)
- Thiruda Thirudi (2003)
- Aai (2004)
- Arivumani (2004)
- Campus (2004)
- Gambeeram (2004)
- Devathaiyai Kanden (2005)
- Jithan (2005)
- Kundakka Mandakka (2005)
- Rendu (2006)
- Kalakkura Chandru (2007)
- Thiru Ranga (2007)
- Niram (2007)
- Evano Oruvan (2007)
- Yaaruku Yaaro (2007)
- Inba (2008)
- Kodaikanal (2008)
- Madurai Ponnu Chennai Paiyan (2008)
- Enga Raasi Nalla Raasi (2009)
- Guru En Aalu (2009)
- Kalloori Kalangal (2010)
- Venghai (2011)
- Ko (2011)
- Maharaja (2011)
- Medhai (2012)
- Aathi Narayana (2012)
- Thirumathi Thamizh (2013)
- En Vazhi Thani Vazhi (2015)
- Killadi (2015)
- 36 Vayadhinile (2015)
- Sathuran (2015)
- Sutta Pazham Sudatha Pazham (2016)
- Bestie (2022)
- Vasco Da Gama (2024)
- Brother (2024)
- Otha Votu Muthaiya (2025)
- Others (2025)
- Devil's Double Next Level (2025) as himself

Television

- Mama Maaple
- Chinna Papa Periya Papa
