= Captain (1994 film) =

- Theatrical release poster of the Tamil version
- Directed by: Kodi Ramakrishna
- Written by: Kodi Ramakrishna
- Produced by: R. B. Choudary
- Starring: R. Sarathkumar; Sukanya; Ranjitha
- Cinematography: Kodi Lakshmanan
- Edited by: Suresh Tata
- Music by: Sirpy
- Production company: Super Good Films
- Release dates: 25 February 1994 (Tamil); 4 March 1994 (Telugu)
- Running time: 140 minutes
- Country: India
- Languages: Telugu; Tamil

Captain is a 1994 Indian action film written and directed by Kodi Ramakrishna and produced by R. B. Choudary of Super Good Films. The film stars R. Sarathkumar, Sukanya, and Ranjitha. Originally shot in Telugu, it was partially reshot in Tamil, which was released on 25 February 1994. The original Telugu version was released on 4 March 1994.

== Plot ==
Kannappa Rao is a powerful mafia lord. He, along with his sons Vijaya and Jaya, spread terror around Visakhapatnam. They are known for land grabbing. One day, Vijaya and Jaya threaten Ramasamy to give them his land in which there is an orphanage, but Ramasamy refuses. He is brutally killed in front of Gowri. The information reaches his brother Shiva, a short-tempered soldier. His superiors reject his request to leave the military camp, so he flees the camp. In the past, Shiva was in love with Uma, but she died in a plane crash. Later, Shiva complains against Kannappa Rao and hires lawyer Lakshmi Narayanan. Lakshmi Narayanan's daughter Gowri, who is mute, becomes the eyewitness of the case. What transpires next forms the rest of the story.

== Cast ==
- R. Sarathkumar as Captain Shiva
- Sukanya as Uma
- Ranjitha as Gowri
- Raghuvaran as Kannappa Rao
- Sarath Babu as Ramasamy
- Costumes Krishna as Tiger Thatha Chari
- Janagaraj as Lakshmi Narayanan
- Ramesh Khanna as Commando
- Rocky as Vijaya
- Devan as Jaya
- Sudha as Lakshmi
- Raju Sundaram (special appearance in "Oyyari Buggameedu")
- Kanal Kannan as Auto Driver (special appearance)

== Soundtrack ==
The music was composed by Sirpy.

Telugu track listing
No.	Title	Lyrics	Singer(s)	Length
1.	"Mate Rani Maina"	Sirivennela Seetharama Sastry	S. P. Balasubrahmanyam, K. S. Chithra	4:37
2.	"Eraku Dorikina Magasiri Molaka"	Sirivennela Seetharama Sastry	S. P. Balasubrahmanyam, K. S. Chithra, Malgudi Subha	4:13
3.	"Oyyari Buggameedu"	Jonnavittula Ramalingeswara Rao	Suresh Peters, Malgudi Subha	5:03
4.	"Paaliyyave Hoi"	Jonnavittula Ramalingeswara Rao	Mano, K. S. Chithra	3:45
5.	"Neeku Pichi Naaku Pichi"	Jonnavittula Ramalingeswara Rao	S. P. Balasubrahmanyam	3:50
Total length:				21:28

All lyrics are written by Vairamuthu.

Tamil track listing
No.	Title	Singer(s)	Length
1.	"Kannil Aadum Roja"	S. P. Balasubrahmanyam, Swarnalatha	4:39
2.	"Iduppu Adikkadi Pudikkidhu"	K. S. Chithra, Shahul Hameed, Malgudi Subha	4:01
3.	"Unakku Oru Macham"	Suresh Peters, Malgudi Subha	5:05
4.	"Kannatthula Vai"	S. P. Balasubrahmanyam, K. S. Chithra	3:47
5.	"Natukkulle"	Malaysia Vasudevan	3:51
Total length:			21:23

== Release ==
The Tamil version of Captain was released on 25 February 1994, alongside another Sarathkumar starrer Aranmanai Kaavalan. The original Telugu version was released on 4 March 1994. Although Sarathkumar wanted either the Tamil Captain or Aranmanai Kaavalan to be postponed, the producers remained adamant.

== Reception ==
Malini Mannath, writing for The Indian Express, panned the Tamil version of the film: "An insipid screenplay, jerky narration, careless handling of the subject, lack of continuity in scenes and lacklustre performances make Captain one of the worst of [Sarathkumar's] films". Reviewing the same version, R. P. R. of Kalki wrote that by looking at the title, he thought this to be a story about a soldier who received a medal, but to his dismay, it had elements of military hotel, action, explosion, murder here and called it a terrible rupture; on one side let it be that the film offers nothing new but do not understand what it is.
