= Senathipathi =

1996 film by M. Rathnakumar

- Poster
- Directed by: M. Rathnakumar
- Written by: M. Rathnakumar
- Produced by: Malar Balu; K. Dhandapani
- Starring: Sathyaraj; Soundarya; Sukanya
- Cinematography: B. Kannan
- Edited by: K. Pazhanivel
- Music by: Deva
- Production company: Malar Films
- Release date: 10 November 1996
- Running time: 155 minutes
- Country: India
- Language: Tamil

Senathipathi (/seɪnɑːðɪpəθi/ transl. Chief) is a 1996 Indian Tamil language drama film written and directed by M. Rathnakumar. The film stars Sathyaraj in dual roles, along with Soundarya and Sukanya. It was released on 10 November 1996.

== Plot ==
Senathipathi is a rich and respected villager. He is married to Meenakshi, while his younger brother Sethupathi is good-for-nothing. Senathipathi and Lingappan, another rich, respected village man and their area chief, are best friends. Senathipathi has been charged for the past 10 years with the duty of protecting the village against robbers, which he has fulfilled with 100% efficiency. Lingappan's daughter Aishwarya, a clever, beautiful, and arrogant girl, returns after studying in the city. Sethupathi and Aishwarya eventually fall in love, but Lingappan is against inter-caste marriage and sees them together. Nagappan is a long-distant relative of Lingappan and the head of their rival village. Though he is rich, Nagappan has bad habits, and so does his only son. Lingappan's and Nagappan's villages clash every year to receive water from the canal during farming season, though justice is on Lingappan's village. After failing to get water for the past 10 years, Nagappa receives photos of Sethu and Aishwarya clubbing each other. He sends the photos to all of his caste's leaders so that no one would wed Aishwarya. Then, Nagappan can make his son marry her and have all of Lingappam's properties, including the canal's check-dams, owned by him.

Meanwhile, to protect Aishwarya, Lingappan cleverly assigns her to live in Senathipathi's house until her marriage, so that she would be a guarded object of Senathipathi, and his brother would be away from her. Sethu and Aishwarya try to break up, but cannot. Aishwarya blackmails Sethu to marry her the next day, or she will commit suicide. The next day, at the moment of marriage, Senathipathi intercepts Sethu, asking him to either surrender Aishwarya or come to a one-on-one till death. Sethu surrenders Aishwarya and is expelled from the house. Lingappan sees all of this from afar. He tries to get an alliance with Aishwarya but fails. Then, Nagappan proposes an alliance, and Lingappan takes it. Sethupathi hands over Aishwarya and keeps his honour. Then, Aishwarya and her mother plead that Lingappan change his mind. When he is about to, Nagappan and his son come and drag Aishwarya out to be wed. Lingappan shoots both of them dead and starts to find Sethupathi.

Meanwhile, Senathipathi and his wife are attacked on the way home. Though Sethupathi joins them, a traitor stabs both Senathipathi and his wife. At the dying moments, Senathipathi consents to marriage, removes the thali from his dead wife's neck, and gives it to Sethupathi. Sethu then marries Aishwarya there. After a few days, Sethupathi becomes the new chief of the village guards.

== Cast ==
- Sathyaraj as Senathipathi and Sethupathi Thevar
- Soundarya as Aishwarya
- Sukanya as Meenakshi
- Goundamani as Kathavarayan
- Senthil as Veera Bahu
- Vijayakumar as Lingappan Nayakar
- Srividya as Lingappan's wife
- Manivannan as Nagappan
- Ponvannan as Nagappan's son
- Periya Karuppu Thevar as Meenakshi's father
- Mohan V. Ram as Rangachari
- Pasi Narayanan as Thavasi
- Ponnambalam
- Mahanadi Shankar
- Thyagu
- K. K. Soundar
- Oru Viral Krishna Rao
- MRK
- Dhanapal
- MLA Malaya
- Bayilvan Ranganathan
- MLA Thangaraj
- Mahendran
- Viswanath
- Chandrasekhar as Suruli (guest appearance)

== Soundtrack ==
The music was composed by Deva.

Track listing
No.	Title	Lyrics	Singer(s)	Length
1.	"Chikku Pukku Ponnamma"	Vairamuthu	Mano, Krishnaraj	5:03
2.	"En Idhayathai Thirudivittai"	Vairamuthu	Swarnalatha, Mano	5:20
3.	"Moonu Mozhama Malliyappoo"	Vairamuthu	S. P. Balasubrahmanyam, K. S. Chithra	4:35
4.	"Palaivana Roja"	M. Rathnakumar	S. P. Balasubrahmanyam, K. S. Chithra	4:39
5.	"Yarukkum Thalaivanangaa"	M. Rathnakumar	S. P. Balasubrahmanyam, 'Baby' Deepika, K. S. Chithra	4:34
Total length:				24:11

== Reception ==
R. P. R. of Kalki praised Sathyaraj's performance but felt Rathnakumar's direction was similar to his mentor Bharathiraja and also added when the world of cinema is heading towards grandeur and many other things, the makers are still stuck with subject like caste and its consequences.

== Post-release ==
Ratnakumar later worked on a project titled Enna Solla Pogirai featuring debutants Nandha, Saikiran and Gayathri Raguram in 2001, but the film was later stalled.
