= Raja Pandi =

- Theatrical release poster
- Directed by: Manoj Kumar
- Written by: R. P. Viswam (dialogues)
- Story by: Manoj Kumar
- Produced by: Muktha Ravi; Muktha Govind; Muktha S. Sundar
- Starring: Sarathkumar; Sukanya; Vadivelu; Kasthuri
- Cinematography: Lakshmibalan
- Edited by: K. Palanivel
- Music by: Deva
- Production company: Mukhthaa Arts
- Release date: 9 September 1994
- Country: India
- Language: Tamil

Raja Pandi (Tamil pronunciation: [ɾaːdʑapaːɳɖi]) is a 1994 Indian Tamil-language action film, directed by Manoj Kumar and produced by Muktha Ravi. The film stars Sarathkumar, Sukanya, Vadivelu and Kasthuri. It was released on 9 September 1994.

== Cast ==
- Sarathkumar as Rajapandi
- Sukanya as Rani Bhuvana
- Vadivelu
- Kasthuri
- Senthil
- Latha
- K. R. Vijaya as Parvathiyammal
- Rajeev

== Soundtrack ==
The music was composed by Deva, with lyrics by Vairamuthu.

| Song | Singers |
|---|---|
| "Athipazham" | S. P. Balasubrahmanyam, K. S. Chithra |
| "Chithrai Masthula" | Swarnalatha |
| "Maharani" | S. P. Balasubrahmanyam, K. S. Chithra |
| "Naan Aadi" | S. Janaki |
| "Paaye Than" | K. S. Chithra |

== Reception ==
Malini Mannath of The Indian Express wrote, "The director is not able to maintain the interest throughout the film". Thulasi of Kalki said the film has story within a story and that the film does not move a single bit from the old formula. She found Deva's music as melodious while appreciating the editing as the film's lifeline and he has worked hard to show story within a story without confusion but panned Sarathkumar's acting and Manojkumar's direction.
