= Palaivana Paravaigal =

- DVD cover
- Directed by: Senthilnathan
- Written by: Sendhilnathan; S. Gajendra Kumar (dialogues)
- Produced by: K. S. Srinivasan; K. S. Sivaraman
- Starring: Sarathkumar; Anandaraj; Udhayan; Dharini
- Cinematography: M. Kesavan
- Edited by: J. Elango
- Music by: Ilayagangai
- Production company: Vasans Visual Ventures
- Release date: 15 September 1990
- Running time: 130 minutes
- Country: India
- Language: Tamil

Palaivana Paravaigal (transl. Desert Birds) is a 1990 Indian Tamil-language crime film directed by Senthilnathan. The film stars Sarathkumar, Anandaraj, newcomer Udhayan and newcomer Dharini. It was released on 15 September 1990, and ran for over 100 days in theatres.

== Plot ==
Mamu and Machi, two orphans and heartless criminals, are sentenced to the death penalty. Raja, their cellmate, is an innocent youth who is in love with Kaveri. Mamu and Machi decide to save Raja and they go to his village before their death sentence.

== Cast ==
- Sarathkumar as Mamu
- Anandaraj as Machi
- Udhayan as Raja
- Dharini as Kaveri
- Jaishankar as Sivaprakasam
- Jayanthi
- Senthil as Peruchali
- Sampathkumar as Pannaiyar
- Sethu Vinayagam as Advocate
- Charuhasan
- Senthilnathan
- Kula Deivam V. R. Rajagopal
- K. Natraj as Kannayiram
- S. N. Lakshmi
- Loose Mohan
- Kovai Senthil
- T. S. Raghavendra
- A. K. Veerasamy

== Production ==
Palaivana Paravaigal is the first film to feature Anandaraj and Sarathkumar in leading roles, after several films where they portrayed negative roles.

== Soundtrack ==
The music was composed by Ilayagangai.

Song	Singer(s)	Lyrics	Duration
"Muthu Samba"	Malaysia Vasudevan, Uma Ramanan, Chorus	Muthulingam	4:38
"Naan Raakaalam"	S. N. Surendar, Sundarrajan, Sasirekha	Piraisoodan	3:57
"Naanga Mattum"	Malaysia Vasudevan, S. N. Surendar	Sembaya	3:55
"Saamy"	Malaysia Vasudevan, K. S. Chithra	Piraisoodan	4:36
"Thingal Pathi"	Mano, Uma Ramanan	S. Kalayarasan	3:55
