= All India Samathuva Makkal Katchi =

- Abbreviation: AISMK
- Founder: R. Sarathkumar
- Founded: 31 August 2007; 19 years ago
- Dissolved: 12 March 2024; 2 years ago
- Merged into: Bharatiya Janata Party
- Alliance: AIADMK-led Alliance (2011-2021); Makkal Needhi Maiam (2021); National Democratic Alliance (2019-2021) (2024)

Party flag
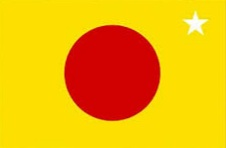

The All India Samathuva Makkal Katchi (transl. All India Equality People's Party; abbr. AISMK) was an Indian regional political party in the state of Tamil Nadu. It was founded by the former member of parliament of the Republic of India R. Sarathkumar on 31 August 2007. The party was led by Sarathkumar as president until 12 March 2024 from its date of founding. On 12 March 2024, the AISMK was merged into the Bharatiya Janata Party by its founder Sarathkumar, and presided over by K. Annamalai, the state president of the Tamil Nadu BJP.

== History ==
=== R. Sarathkumar era (2007–24) ===
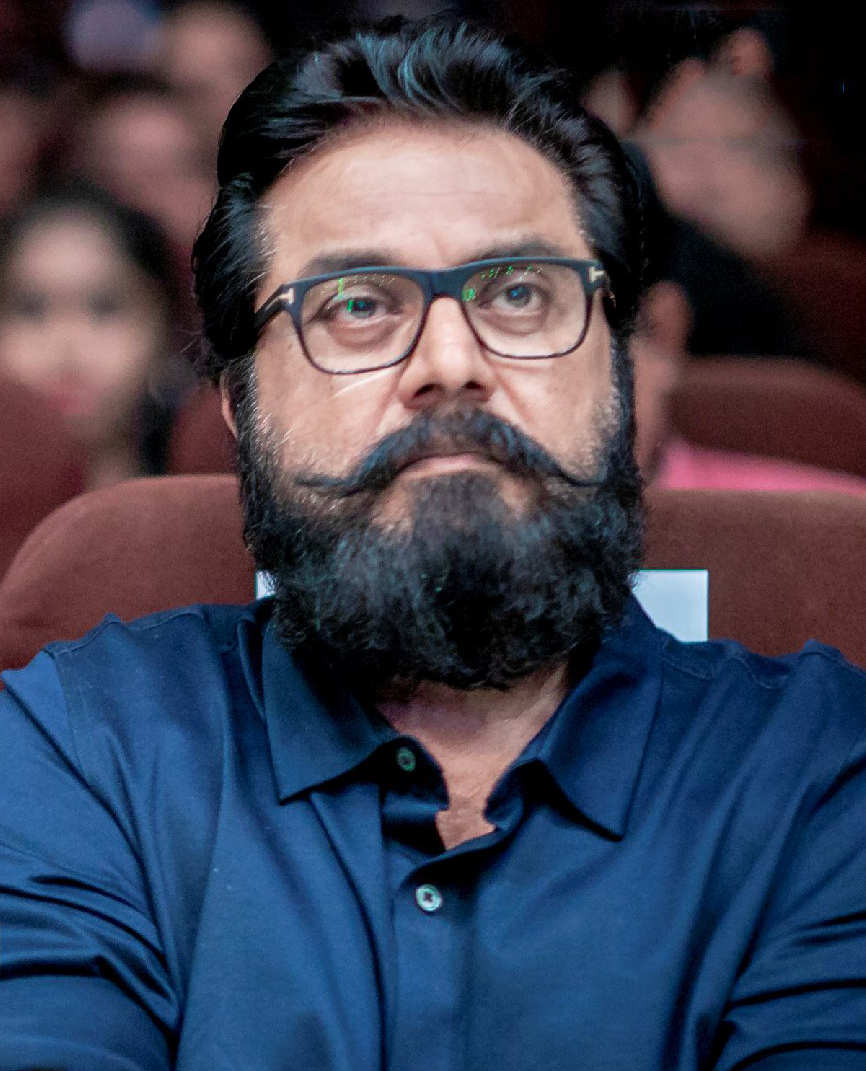
R. Sarathkumar
Founder of the party

The party was founded on 31 August 2007 by R. Sarathkumar, a veteran Tamil film star and politician. In the 2011 Tamil Nadu Legislative Assembly election, the party became part of the AIADMK-led Alliance, which included the left and actor-turned-politician Vijayakant's Desiya Murpokku Dravida Kazhagam (DMDK). In that alliance, the AISMK contested the candidature of R. Sarathkumar in Tenkasi and Ernavoor A. Narayanan in Nanguneri in the two leaves symbol as the AIADMK candidate and won both the seats. Also the alliance swept the polls by winning 203 seats. AIADMK general secretary J. Jayalalithaa was sworn in as chief minister of Tamil Nadu for the fourth time.

In the 2016 Tamil Nadu Legislative Assembly election, the party continued the alliance, and in that alliance, the AISMK contested the candidature of R. Sarathkumar in Tiruchendur in the two leaves symbol as the AIADMK candidate and lost to DMK candidate Anitha R. Radhakrishnan by a margin of 26,001 votes.

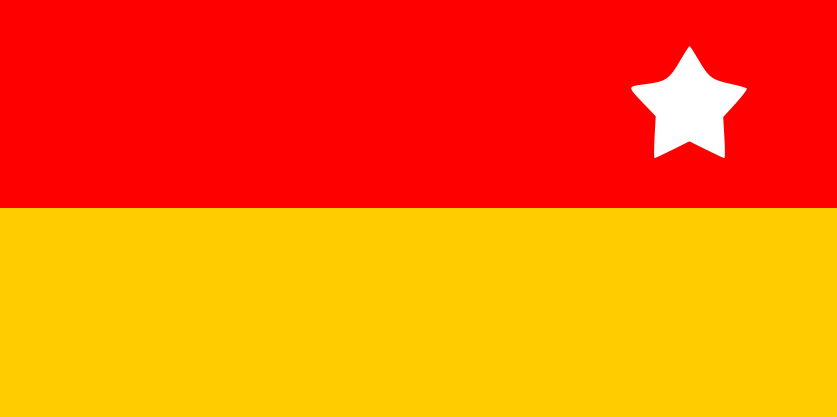
Flag adopted by AISMK, 2007-2020

In November 2017, Sarathkumar said in an interview for The Hindu: "For the last 10 years, I have been closely associated with AIADMK. In fact, I have even been identified as the party's propaganda secretary. Though I don't regret this identification, my party couldn't grow. Now, I want to focus on my party and be seen as a possible chief minister candidate.".

In the 2021 Tamil Nadu Legislative Assembly election, the party aligned with Makkal Needhi Maiam (MNM), and in that alliance, the AISMK contested 33 seats in the torch light symbol as the MNM candidate and lost in every seat contested.

== Dissolution ==
On 12 March 2024, the All India Samathuva Makkal Katchi was merged into the Bharatiya Janata Party by its founder Sarathkumar, and presided over by K. Annamalai, the president of the Tamil Nadu BJP in Chennai.
