= Thai Mozhi =

- Theatrical release poster
- Directed by: R. R. Ilavarasan
- Written by: Liyakat Ali Khan
- Produced by: A. Thamizh Fathima
- Starring: Sarath Kumar; Mohini
- Cinematography: Rajarajan
- Edited by: G. Jayachandran
- Music by: Ilaiyaraaja
- Production company: Thamizh Annai Creations
- Distributed by: Rowther Films
- Release date: 25 October 1992
- Running time: 144 minutes
- Country: India
- Language: Tamil

Thai Mozhi (transl. Mother Tongue) is a 1992 Tamil-language action drama film directed by R. R. Ilavarasan. The film stars Sarath Kumar and Mohini, with Vijayakanth in a special appearance. It was released on 25 October 1992.

== Plot ==
Rajasimham, the local rowdy, is orphaned after his widowed mother commits suicide, unable to bear the insinuations about her chastity. In the coastal village is rich man Mariadas, whose main occupation is to terrorise the villagers and cavort with his girlfriend. Mariadas and Rajasimham are enemies from boyhood when the former had manipulated the latter to question his mother's chastity.

Rajasimham takes a fancy for Anthony's widowed daughter Mary. Rajasimham assists Anthony in his fishing activities. After an encounter with the henchman of Mariadas, Rajasimham is arrested by the police inspector and put behind bars. The inspector, after a few fights with Mariadas crowd, is transferred to Delhi but gets Rajasimham released before leaving. The inspector advises the rowdy to change his ways.

Rajasimham comes back to the village and ekes out his living as a fisherman assisting Anthony. Mariadas, who has an eye on Mary, destroys Rajasimham's boat but he takes it his in stride. Mariadas masterminds the death of Anthony at sea and tries to put the blame on Rajasimham but Mary is not convinced. Unable to get Mary to desert Rajasimham, the rich man uses religion to break up the alliance.

Mary, being a Christian and a widow, cannot stay in the house of Rajasimham, says Mariadas and takes upon himself the job finding a groom for her. One of his henchmen is chosen and Rajasimham, who is lying unconscious after being beaten up by the goons of Mariadas, recovers fast enough to gatecrash into the church and battle his way out with the girl he desires.

== Cast ==
- Sarath Kumar as Rajasimham
- Mohini as Mary
- M. N. Nambiar as Church Father
- Gemini Ganesan as Anthony
- Mansoor Ali Khan as Mariadas
- Silk Smitha
- Yuvasri as Rajasimman's mother
- Vijayakanth as Inspector Alex (Special appearance)

== Production ==
Vijayakanth made a special appearance, and charged no remuneration for doing so.

== Soundtrack ==
The music was composed by Ilaiyaraaja. "Singara Maane" song was written by Lyricist Piraisoodan.

Track listing
No.	Title	Singer(s)	Length
1.	"Madurai Veeran"	Ilaiyaraaja
2.	"Singara Maane"	Mano, Swarnalatha
3.	"Kodi Muthukelai"	Mano, S. Janaki
4.	"Jinjilara"	S. Janaki
5.	"Thaai Illa Pillai"	Arunmozhi

== Critical reception ==
Ayyappa Prasad of The Indian Express wrote, "The weak story and screenplay have deprived the film of punch though the action scenes have been well taken". Sundarji of Kalki found the film boring but praised the locations, dance and fight choreography and panned the music as average.
