= Senthamizh Paattu =

1992 film by P. Vasu

- Poster
- Directed by: P. Vasu
- Written by: P. Vasu
- Produced by: M. S. V. Gopi
- Starring: Prabhu; Sukanya
- Cinematography: Jayanan Vincent
- Edited by: P. Mohanraj
- Music by: Viswanathan-Ilaiyaraaja
- Production company: Janaki Films
- Release date: 25 October 1992
- Running time: 141 minutes
- Country: India
- Language: Tamil

Senthamizh Paattu (transl. Pure Tamil Duet) is a 1992 Indian Tamil-language musical drama film, written and directed by P. Vasu. The film stars Prabhu and Sukanya while Salim Ghouse plays a supporting role. It was released on 25 October 1992 on the eve of Diwali and was a box office hit. The film was remade in Telugu as Amma Koduku (1993), and in Kannada as Rasika (1994).

== Plot ==
Against his mother's wishes, Balu becomes a singer who falls for Durga, a kind-hearted, wealthy girl and learns about the past connection between their families.

== Cast ==
- Prabhu as Balasubramaniyan (alias) Bala
- Sukanya as Durgadevi (alias) Durga
- Kasthuri as Shanmathi
- Sujatha as Singer Kalaivani
- Ravikumar as Ravi
- Vijayakumar as Professor Rangasamy
- Manjula as Meenakshi
- Salim Ghouse as M.P Rajarathnam
- Kavitha as Rajeswari
- Kazan Khan as Boopathy
- Goundamani as Murugesan
- V. Gopalakrishnan as Ravi Father
- LIC Narasimhan as College Professor
- Ponnambalam as Fighter
- Sakthi as Young Bala
- Chelladurai as Murugesan Father-in-law
- Mayilsamy as Gonavayan

== Production ==
The success of P. Vasu's family drama En Thangachi Padichava (1988) starring Prabhu prompted further collaborations in the same genre between the pair with Chinna Thambi (1991) and Senthamizh Paattu (1992) being released soon after.

== Soundtrack ==
The music was composed by M. S. Viswanathan and Ilaiyaraaja, after their collaboration in Mella Thirandhathu Kadhavu with lyrics by Vaali. The song "Solli Solli" gave a break to its singer Sunanda.

Song	Singers	Length
"Vanna Vanna"	Jikki	05:01
"Adi Komadha"	S. P. Balasubrahmanyam	05:08
"Chinna Chinna Thooral"	S. P. Balasubrahmanyam, Anuradha Rajkrishna	05:09
"Indha"	Mano	05:09
"Kuttukoru"	Mano	04:54
"Kalayil Kethattu"	S. P. Balasubrahmanyam, Swarnalatha	05:12
"Solli Solli"	S. P. Balasubrahmanyam, Sunanda	05:11

== Release and reception ==
Senthamizh Paattu was released on 25 October 1992, Diwali day. Malini Mannath of The Indian Express lauded Sukanya's performance and the music, but called the film "rather a crude imitation" of Chinna Thambi. Supraja Sridharan of Kalki wrote that if one could tolerate vulgar comedy, they could enjoy the film for the naïve Sukanya, playful Kasthuri, natural Prabhu and beautiful music. Balasubrahmanyam won the Cinema Express Award for Best Male Playback Singer.
