= Idhuthanda Sattam =

- Poster
- Directed by: Senthilnathan
- Written by: Senthilnathan; A. Varunan (dialogues)
- Produced by: Mylai R. V. Gurupadam
- Starring: R. Sarathkumar; Rekha; Aamani
- Cinematography: M. Kesavan
- Edited by: J. Elango
- Music by: Sangeetha Rajan
- Production company: G. R. P. Films
- Release date: 29 May 1992
- Running time: 110 minutes
- Country: India
- Language: Tamil

Idhuthanda Sattam (transl. This is the law) is a 1992 Indian Tamil language crime action film directed by Senthilnathan. The film stars R. Sarathkumar, Rekha and Aamani. It was released on 29 May 1992.

== Plot ==
Selvaraj, an upright police officer, takes charge as a SP in a new area and he settles down there with his daughter Meena. A woman inspector Amudha helps him. Selvaraj challenges a notorious man Gurusami and his henchmen Kaali, Dharma and Soori to punish them. Amudha is intrigued by Selvaraj and he tells her about his tragic past.

In the past, Selvaraj lived happily with his wife Lakshmi, newborn baby and his father-in-law, the judge Venugopal. During the deepavali festival, they all witnessed a murder committed by the rowdy Gurusami. Gurusami sent his henchmen to kill Selvaraj's family. During the confrontation, Lakshmi and Venugopal were murdered, while Selvaraj was seriously injured and his baby spared. Gurusami was later sentenced to the death penalty but he managed to be released thanks to his henchmen. Selvaraj is now determined to punish them.

== Cast ==
- R. Sarathkumar as SP Selvaraj IPS
- Rekha as Lakshmi
- Aamani (credited as Meenakshi) as Amudha
- Goundamani as Karuppan
- Senthil
- Mylai R.V. Gurupadam as Gurusami
- Mansoor Ali Khan as Kaali
- K. Natraj as Dharma
- Justin as Soori
- Senthilnathan as Ponnusamy
- Typist Gopu
- V. S. Raghavan as Venugopal
- V. Gopalakrishnan as Commissioner
- Idichapuli Selvaraj as Amudha's father
- Suryakanth
- Sharmili
- Dharani
- Kamala Kamesh
- Surekha
- Shanthi
- K. S. Jayalakshmi as Gurusami's father
- Baby Pushpambika as Meena (child)
- Baby Jennifer as Meena (baby)

== Soundtrack ==
The soundtrack was composed by Sangeetha Rajan, with lyrics written by Muthulingam and Piraisoodan.

| Song | Singer(s) | Duration |
|---|---|---|
| "Azhagana Poonthottam" | Jayachandran, P. Susheela | 3:53 |
| "Kuruvi Kunju" | K. S. Chithra | 3:16 |
| "Kuruvi Kunju" | P. Susheela | 3:36 |

== Reception ==
RSP of The Indian Express gave the film a positive review citing "the dialogue is crisp and meaningful, Senthinathan's direction noteworthy. Sangeetha Rajan's music is average. R. Sarathkumar flexes his muscles well. Rekha is quite satisfactory in a small role".
