= Kottai Vaasal =

- Film poster
- Directed by: Selva Vinayagam
- Written by: C. Dhinakaran (dialogues)
- Screenplay by: Selva Vinayagam
- Story by: Mohan Natarajan
- Produced by: Mohan Natarajan; Tharangai V. Shanmugam
- Starring: Arun Pandian; Sukanya; Saranya; Goundamani
- Cinematography: B. R. Vijayalakshmi
- Edited by: P. Venkateswara Rao
- Music by: Deva
- Production company: Sree Rajakaaliamman Enterprises
- Release date: 15 August 1992
- Running time: 137 minutes
- Country: India
- Language: Tamil

Kottai Vaasal (transl. Fort entrance) is a 1992 Indian Tamil-language action drama film directed by Selva Vinayagam. The film stars Arun Pandian, Sukanya, Saranya and Goundamani. It was released on 15 August 1992.

== Cast ==
- Arun Pandian as Velu and Sendhoorapandi
- Sukanya
- Saranya as Rekha
- Goundamani
- Chandrasekhar in friendly appearance
- Mohan Natarajan as Periyavar
- Rocky
- Choudri
- Krishnamurthy
- Ponnambalam
- Veeraraghavan
- Ravishankar
- Veerabathran
- Pasi Narayanan
- Dhideer Kannaiyah
- C. Dhinakaran
- Yuvasri
- Premi
- Mahima

== Soundtrack ==
The soundtrack was composed by Deva and lyrics written by Kalidasan.

Track listing
No.	Title	Singer(s)	Length
1.	"Mannavane Mannavane"	K. S. Chithra, S. P. Balasubrahmanyam
2.	"Aathirathil"	S. P. Balasubrahmanyam
3.	"Kai Vachu"	S. Janaki, S. P. Balasubrahmanyam
4.	"Vaaya En"	Malgudi Subha
5.	"Kottai Vaasalukku"	S. P. Balasubrahmanyam

== Reception ==
The Indian Express called the storyline "far-fetched", praising the performances of the artists while calling Deva's music "average".
