= Ilavarasan =

- Theatrical release poster
- Directed by: Senthilnathan
- Screenplay by: Senthilnathan
- Story by: Radha Veerannan
- Produced by: V. Thamilazhagan; V. Selvam; V. Thangaraj
- Starring: R. Sarathkumar; Sukanya
- Cinematography: M. Kesavan
- Edited by: K. R. Krishnan
- Music by: Deva
- Production company: Sathya Movies
- Release date: 15 January 1992
- Running time: 105 minutes
- Country: India
- Language: Tamil

Ilavarasan (transl. Prince) (Note: Also the title character.) is a 1992 Indian Tamil-language film directed by Senthilnathan. The film stars R. Sarathkumar and Sukanya, while Senthilnathan plays the antagonist. It was released on 15 January 1992.

== Plot ==
Mirasu killed his elder brother Selvanayagam and Selvanayaga's wife. He also tried to kill his mistress Lakshmi for the inheritance. The innocent Lakshmi was then sent to jail for Selvanayagam's murder and gave birth there, with the help of a police officer. She then escaped from jail with her son Vijay.

Many years later, Mirasu spreads terror among the villagers and rapes a village girl. His son follows his path. Poongodu and her family try to flee the village, but Mirasu's henchmen intervene, and Vijay saves them. Vijay, who comes from another village, introduces himself as an orphan. Poongodu falls in love with Vijay and he marries her. Finally, Vijay clashes with Mirasu. What transpires later forms the crux of the story.

== Cast ==
- R. Sarathkumar as Ilavarasan (Vijay)
- Sukanya as Poongodi
- Goundamani
- Kavitha as Lakshmi
- Senthilnathan as Mirasu
- Senthamarai
- Vennira Aadai Moorthy as Kanakku
- Nizhalgal Ravi as Selvanayagam
- C. R. Saraswathi as Selvanayagam's wife
- Vadivelu
- Swamikannu
- Bayilvan Ranganathan
- Ashwani Kumar
- Paal
- M. Rajkumar
- Kokila as Kannatta
- Babitha
- V. R. Thilakam
- Vasantha
- Sharmili
- Vasanthi
- Suseela Patti
- Baby Pushpa
- V. Thamilazhagan

== Production ==
The film began production in September 1991 and was planned to be shot in one stretch.

== Soundtrack ==
The music was composed by Deva.

Song	Singer(s)	Lyrics	Duration
"Aaniponne Asaikanne"	K. S. Chithra	Muthulingam	5:07
"Kaatuparavaigal"	S. P. Balasubrahmanyam, K. S. Chithra	Na. Kamarasan	5:04
"Kangalilthoodhuvidu"	S. P. Balasubrahmanyam, K. S. Chithra	Muthulingam	4:24
"Thaaye Nee"	K. S. Chithra	Kadhal Mathi	4:26
"Yaaro Neeyaaro"	K. J. Yesudas	Piraisoodan	4:44

== Critical reception ==
The Indian Express wrote that though the film appeared to have been hastily made, director Senthilnathan "makes the most of the opportunity", and also appreciated Sukanya's performance.
