= Natchathira Nayagan =

- Theatrical release poster
- Directed by: Senthilnathan
- Screenplay by: Senthilnathan
- Story by: P. L. Sundarrajan
- Produced by: Tamizharasan; Padmanapan
- Starring: R. Sarathkumar; Rohini
- Cinematography: M. Kesavan
- Edited by: J. Elango
- Music by: Deva
- Production company: Angalamman Creations
- Release date: 4 December 1992
- Running time: 110 minutes
- Country: India
- Language: Tamil

Natchathira Nayagan (transl. Star Hero) is a 1992 Indian Tamil-language action film directed by Senthilnathan. The film stars R. Sarathkumar and Rohini, with Jaishankar, Kavitha, Goundamani, Senthil, Rocky, Ashok Sundaram and Nalinikanth playing supporting roles. It was released on 4 December 1992.

== Plot ==
Vijay, a convict, escapes from jail. Elsewhere, Radha works as a secretary for the wealthy mill owner Thanikasalam. Thanikasalam's greedy son Ashok and the rowdy Sakhivel kill Thanikasalam, in the process they also kill two witnesses and hide Thanikasalam's corpse in Radha's car. That night, Radha drives her car (with Thanikasalam's body in the car trunk) to the gas station and gets a stranger into her car. The stranger is none other than the fugitive Vijay, and he takes Radha as a hostage.

In the past, Vijay lived happily with his widow sister. He dreamt of marrying his beloved niece Bhavani but she was in love with Thanikasalam's son Ashok. Vijay accepted for her love. Ashok cheated her and when he was to become engaged to a wealthy groom, Bhavani stopped it and mentioned her relationship with Ashok. The engagement was cancelled and the angry Ashok killed her, the innocent Vijay was wrongly accused by the police. He was then sentenced to life in prison.

Vijay and Radha finally discover Thanikasalam's corpse in a car trunk, the police also see it. Not only Vijay but Radha too is wanted by the police. In the meantime, they fall in love with each other. What transpires next forms the rest of the story.

== Cast ==
- R. Sarathkumar as Vijay
- Rohini as Radha
- Jaishankar
- Kavitha as Kavitha
- Goundamani as Thiruvasagam
- Senthil as Thiruvasagam's assistant
- Rocky as Rocky
- Ashok Sundaram as Ashok
- Nalinikanth as Sakhivel
- Disco Shanti
- Anuja
- Raghavi as Bhavani
- Vaani as Bhavani's mother
- Pratibha
- Baby Aparna as Senthil
- LIC Narasimhan as Judge
- Pasi Narayanan
- Dhanapal
- Telephone Sathyanayanan
- Karuppu Subbiah
- Vellai Subbaiah
- Shakeela
- Senthilnathan

== Soundtrack ==
The music was composed by Deva, with lyrics written by Kathalmathi.

Song	Singer(s)	Duration
"Siru Siru Mazhaithuli"	Mano, Krishnaraj, K. S. Chithra	5:24
"Neela Malai Kaattukullea"	Malaysia Vasudevan, Swarnalatha	4:30
"Vennila"	Swarnalatha	4:31
"Nallathaan Maatti"	S. P. Balasubrahmanyam, K. S. Chithra	4:45
"Poo Malligai"	Malgudi Subha	4:51

== Reception ==
Malini Mannath of The Indian Express gave the film a negative review and said, "the film begins promisingly [..] the rest of the film is better forgotten. The script is mediocre and the plot not strong."
