= Aadhityan =

- Directed by: V. L. Bashkaraaj
- Written by: V. L. Bashkaraaj
- Produced by: G. R. Ethiraj; R. Achuthananthan; Easwari Ulaganathan; P. Sujatha; E. Rajan; C.Kumaran
- Starring: R. Sarathkumar; Sukanya
- Cinematography: Devchand Ren
- Edited by: Ganesh–Kumar
- Music by: Gangai Amaran
- Production company: Vellore Film Associates
- Release date: 14 January 1993
- Running time: 150 minutes
- Country: India
- Language: Tamil

Aadhityan is a 1993 Indian Tamil-language action drama film directed by V. L. Bashkaraaj. The film stars R. Sarathkumar and Sukanya. It was released on 14 January 1993.

== Plot ==
Aadhityan is an orphaned village blacksmith, and the villagers consider him as a rude ruffian. The neighbouring zamindar forces the villagers to leave the village, and they land in Aadhityan's village. Aadhityan helps them and then clashes with the zamindar. In the meantime, Chinna Paandi, a Tamil teacher, is engaged in teaching Tamil to the Telugu girl Manga. The zamindar finally accepts the villagers in his village. Vedachellam is a gambling addict who borrows money from the zamindar. The zamindar wants his son Vinod to marry Vedachellam's daughter Rasathi. In debt, Vedachellam reluctantly accepts the zamindar's proposal. Chinna Pandi advises Vedachellam to save the village and to have Aadhityan marry Rasathi. The drunk Aadhityan ties the thaali around Rasathi's neck. Rasathi marries Aadhityan, but she hates him.

== Cast ==
- R. Sarathkumar as Aadhityan
- Sukanya as Rasathi
- Pandiarajan as Chinna Paandi
- Silk Smitha as Manga
- Anju
- Kitty as Zamindar
- Delhi Ganesh as Vedachellam
- Shanmugasundaram as Pannayar
- Chinni Jayanth
- Kumarimuthu as Nallakannu
- Master Haja Sheriff as Vellai
- MLA Thangaraj as Pottu Gounder
- M. N. Rajam
- Sulakshana
- Kamala Kamesh
- Kokila as Kannamma
- Thadchayini
- Vinod as Vinod
- R. E. Rajan
- Meghu — Loghu

== Soundtrack ==
The soundtrack was composed by Gangai Amaran who also wrote the lyrics.

Song	Singer(s)	Duration
"Gongura...Nennu Andhra"	Mano, K. S. Chithra	4:28
"Kanna Kadhal Kannukku"	Swarnalatha	3:43
"Kattikko Koora Pattu Selai"	K. S. Chithra, Chorus	4:30
"Kottattum Mela Sattam"	Malaysia Vasudevan, Swarnalatha	4:26
"Uchi Malai"	Gangai Amaran	2:47

== Reception ==
K. Vijiyan of the New Straits Times said, "if more care had been taken with the acting, it would have been remarkable". The Indian Express called it "yet another film that spins a puerile yarn and expects the audience to lap it up, insulting their intelligence in the bargain".
