= Pokkiri Thambi =

- Title card
- Directed by: Senthilnathan
- Screenplay by: Senthilnathan
- Story by: S. Gajendra Kumar
- Produced by: Vijaya Muralee; S. Selvi; P. Pandian
- Starring: Anandaraj; Kaveri
- Cinematography: M. Kesavan
- Edited by: J. Elango
- Music by: Deva
- Production company: Kavi Bharathi Creations
- Release date: 22 May 1992
- Running time: 125 minutes
- Country: India
- Language: Tamil

Pokkiri Thambi (transl. Rogue brother) is a 1992 Indian Tamil-language thriller film directed by Senthilnathan. The film stars Anandaraj and Kaveri, with Vijayakumar, Janagaraj, Jayanthkumar, Balambika, Kumarimuthu, Bayilvan Ranganathan, Anuja, Kullamani, Boopathi Raja and King Kong playing supporting roles. It was released on 22 May 1992.

== Plot ==
In a remote village, many young women have mysteriously disappeared at night and their dead bodies found the following day. Pannaiyar, the village chief, promises the villagers to find and punish the culprit. Thambidurai is an angry young man who works hard during the day in Pannaiyar's farm and enjoys drinking arrack in the night. He lives with his mother and his sister Selvi. Thereafter, Selvi and Pannaiyar's son Jayanthkumar fall in love but Pannaiyar refuses to marry them and humiliates Thambidurai. A vengeful Thambidurai then sneaks into Pannaiyar's house at night and he forcefully rapes Kaveri, thinking that she is Pannaiyar's daughter.

At the village court, Kaveri reveals that her elder sister was found dead a few months ago in this village so she has come to their village to find the culprit. Kaveri was kidnapped that night and the abductor put her in Pannaiyar's house. Thambidurai who went this way raped her. Pannaiyar orders Thambidurai to marry her immediately and he marries her in front of the villagers. Later, Thambidurai finds out that the serial killer and serial rapist is none than Pannaiyar and he exposes Pannaiyar's true face to the villagers. Overcome by embarrassment, Pannaiyar commits suicide by drowning.

== Cast ==
- Anandaraj as Thambidurai
- Kaveri as Kaveri
- Vijayakumar as Pannaiyar
- Janagaraj as Rajamani
- Jayanthkumar as Jayanthkumar
- Balambika as Selvi
- Kumarimuthu as Villager
- Bayilvan Ranganathan as Villager
- Anuja as Irulayee
- Kullamani as Villager
- Boopathi Raja as Maruthu
- King Kong as Thambidurai's friend
- Varalakshmi as Lakshmi
- V. R. Thilagam as Thambidurai's mother
- Pasi Sathya
- Surekha
- Premi as Villager
- Usha Priya as Victim's mother
- Lalitha Kumari as Maruthu's sister
- Senthilnathan as Periya Karuppu

== Soundtrack ==
The music was composed by Deva.

All lyrics are written by Kalidasan.

Track listing
No.	Title	Singer(s)	Length
1.	"Silu Silu"	Mano, K. S. Chithra	4:41
2.	"Marai Karumarai"	Malaysia Vasudevan, K. S. Chithra	5:26
3.	"Yei Mannula Urundu"	Swarnalatha	4:40
4.	"Ootta Kudisakkulla"	S. P. Balasubrahmanyam	4:34
5.	"Mattu Vandi"	Malaysia Vasudevan	4:18
Total length:			23:39

== Reception ==
C. R. K. of Kalki said Anandaraj dominated the film from beginning to end.
