= Solaiyamma =

- Poster
- Directed by: Kasthuri Raja
- Written by: Kasthuri Raja
- Produced by: Jothi Raja
- Starring: Rahul; Sukanya
- Cinematography: K. B. Ahamad
- Edited by: Lancy-Mohan
- Music by: Deva
- Production company: Karpaga Jothi Films
- Release date: 12 December 1992
- Running time: 120 minutes
- Country: India
- Language: Tamil

Solaiyamma is a 1992 Indian Tamil-language film written and directed by Kasthuri Raja. The film stars Rahul, Sukanya and Karikalan. It was released on 12 December 1992.

== Plot ==
Solaiyamma is a motherless woman who is looked after by her father. She has been promised marriage with her relative Balraj, and they are in love. Vairavan is a heartless muscular man who spreads terror among the villagers and rapes the village girls. One night, Vairavan enters Solaiyamma's house and tries to rape her, but she stands against him, and he runs away. The entire village, including Solaiyamma's relatives, think that she has been raped, and then her father commits suicide. Thereafter, she is rejected by the village. Vairavan tortures her psychologically to spend a night with him. What transpires later forms the crux of the story.

== Cast ==
- Rahul as Balraj
- Sukanya as Solaiyamma
- Karikalan as Vairavan
- Janagaraj as Balraj's father
- Senthil as Minor
- Vinu Chakravarthy
- Jai Ganesh
- Gandhimathi as Irulayi
- Ragavi
- Nisha
- Sathyan
- Salem Mathi
- G. Ramachandran as Paramasivan Periyavan
- Gundu Kalyanam
- Periya Karuppu Thevar
- Karuppu Subbiah as Marimuthu
- T. K. S. Karuppaiah
- Pakoda Kadhar
- Idichapuli Selvaraj

== Soundtrack ==
The music was composed by Deva, with lyrics by Kasthuri Raja.

Song	Singer(s)	Duration
"Bannari Maariamma"	S. Janaki	4:54
"Koovurakuyilu"	S. P. Balasubrahmanyam, S. Janaki	4:56
"Maja Thani"	Gangai Amaran, S. Janaki	4:47
"Merku Thodarchi Mala" (male)	Jayachandran	5:08
"Merku Thodarchi Mala" (female)	S. Janaki	5:00
"Oororam"	S. P. Balasubrahmanyam, S. Janaki	4:55
"Pombalangala"	Krishnaraj	5:10
"Raasa Illayaraja"	Gangai Amaran, S. Janaki	5:16
"Thamirabharani"	S. P. Balasubrahmanyam, S. Janaki	4:54

== Critical reception ==
K. Vijiyan of New Straits Times praised the film's message, while Malini Mannath of The Indian Express described the film as "painful viewing". C. R. K. of Kalki also gave a similar negative review for the film, saying it is neither smell of soil nor smell of sore, it is a stench.
