= Thambi Durai =

1997 Indian Tamil film by Senthilnathan

- Directed by: Senthilnathan
- Written by: Senthilnathan, Gajendra Kumar (dialogues)
- Produced by: K. Santhamani
- Starring: Saravanan; Sukanya; M. N. Nambiar
- Cinematography: Ja. Raja
- Edited by: J. Ilango
- Music by: Ilaiyaraaja
- Production company: Sree Maariamman Films
- Distributed by: Sree Maariamman Films
- Release date: 5 December 1997
- Country: India
- Language: Tamil

Thambi Durai is a 1997 Indian Tamil-language action drama film, written and directed by Senthilnathan. The film stars Saravanan, Sukanya and M. N. Nambiar. It was completed in 1994 but was released on 5 December 1997.

== Plot ==
The film starts with narration that the film is based on real event that happened at Irukkangudi. Thambidurai (Saravanan) who stays with his grandfather (MN Nambiar) is a poor boatman and falls in love with a rich girl Shenbagam (Sukanya) who is tortured by her rich stepmother (Manjula Vijayakumar). Thambidurai and Shenbagam elope and get married.

Shenbagam's uncle (Nalinikanth) who wants to marry her, plots with a womanising landlord (Senthilnathan) to separate them. They murder Thambidurai's grandfather and Shenbagam's grandmother. They approach a sorcerer (Bayilvan Ranganathan) who indulges in black magic. The Sorcerer with his magic makes Thambidurai almost dead. Thambidurai is presumed to be dead, but is taken care of by a priest (Shanmugasundaram). Shenbagam is forced to dress up as a widow. Landlord also murders Shenbagam's sister (Mounika) and his own wife by setting up a bomb in tiffin box.

In the climax, by the blessings of goddess, landlord dies by suffering from fits. Thambidurai survives the magic and Nalinikanth gets killed by Manjula.

== Cast ==
- Saravanan as Thambidurai
- Sukanya as Shenbagam
- M. N. Nambiar
- Vadivukkarasi
- Mounika
- Manjula Vijayakumar
- Nalinikanth
- Senthilnathan
- Chinni Jayanth
- K. Natraj
- Bayilvan Ranganathan

== Soundtrack ==
The music was composed by Ilaiyaraaja.

Song	Singers	Lyrics	Length
"Aathu Mettula"	Mano	Piraisoodan	04:55
"Ezhaigalin"	Malaysia Vasudevan	Vaali	04:43
"Kanyakumaree Neeye"	Arunmozhi	Vaali	05:01
"Maama"	Mano, S. Janaki	Vaali	04:58
"Unnai Nambi"	S. Janaki	Vaali	05:36
"Vidhiyaa Vidhavayaa"	Malaysia Vasudevan	Vaali	05:06
