= Senthilnathan =

Indian film director

Senthilnathan Jambulingam
- Born: Senthilnathan Jambulingam; 26 November 1957 (age 68); Chennai, Tamil Nadu, India
- Occupations: director, screenwriter, actor, producer

Senthilnathan Jambulingam is an Indian film director, screenwriter, producer and television actor who predominantly works in Tamil cinema and serials, based in Chennai. He is best known for his action-masala films. As of 2013, he has directed more than twenty five films.

== Personal life ==
He is the son of director Jambulingam who directed M. G. Ramachandran starrer Nam Naadu. Senthilnathan cast his son, Vinod, in the lead role of Unnai Naan (2004).

== Film career ==
Initially, he worked as an assistant to director M. Bhaskar in Soolam (1980) and Pakkathu Veetu Roja (1982). He then worked as an assistant director under S. A. Chandrasekhar for 7 years from Sattam Oru Iruttarai (1981) until Needhikku Thandanai (1987). At that time, he befriended with actor Vijayakanth who promised him to act in his films in the future. When producers proposed him to direct a film, he met Vijayakanth but the actor was in a busy schedule. Waiting for his availability, he worked as an assistant director under V. Azhagappan in three films. Senthilnathan finally made his directorial debut in 1988 with the Tamil film Poonthotta Kaavalkaaran. The film turned out to be a blockbuster.

In 2001, he agreed terms with producer Ibrahim Rowther to make a film titled Kadhal Mudal Kadhal Varai, which would have debutant Bala Kumaran and Uma in the lead role. The film would have marked the director's 25th film, but the producer's financial troubles meant that the film was shelved.

== Filmography ==
Year	Film	Notes
1988	Poonthotta Kaavalkaaran	Debut film
1988	Pattikaatu Thambi	
1989	Padicha Pulla	
1989	Mundhanai Sabadham	
1989	Penn Buthi Mun Buthi	
1990	Paattali Magan	Also actor
1990	Periya Idathu Pillai	
1990	Palaivana Paravaigal	Also actor
1991	Iravu Sooriyan	
1991	Naatai Thirudathe	
1991	Kaaval Nilayam	Also actor
1991	Thangamana Thangachi	Also actor
1992	Ilavarasan	Also actor
1992	Idhuthanda Sattam	Also actor
1992	Natchathira Nayagan	Also actor
1992	Pokkiri Thambi	Also actor
1992	Chinna Poovai Killadhe	
1992	Paalaivana Ragangal	
1992	Deiva Kulandhai	
1995	En Pondatti Nallava	
1996	Aavathum Pennale Azhivathum Pennale	
1997	Thambi Durai	Also actor
1998	Aasai Thambi	
2002	Kambalahalli	Kannada film
2008	Unnai Naan	Also producer

== Television ==
Year	Serial	Channel	Notes
2009–2011	Magal	Sun TV	
2011–2013	Thangam	Sun TV	
2014–2016	Ponnoonjal	Sun TV	
2016–2017	Arundhati	Raj TV	
2018–2020	Nayagi	Sun TV	
2021–2023	Magarasi	Sun TV	
2021–2022	Rettai Roja	Zee Tamil	
2023; 2025	Maari	Zee Tamil	Special Appearance
2023–2024	Anbe Vaa	Sun TV	
2023–2024	Karthigai Deepam	Zee Tamil	Extended Special Appearance
2024–present	Lakshmi	Sun TV	
2024	Thayamma Kudumbathaar	DD Tamil	
2025–2026	Dhanam	Star Vijay	
2025	Sakthivel: Theeyaai Oru Theeraa Kaadhal	Star Vijay	Special Appearance
2025	Paarijaatham	Zee Tamil	

Other works

Year	Serial	Role	Channel
2004-2006	Kalki	Director	Jaya TV
2009–2010	Rudra	Director	Zee Tamizh
2020	Minnale	Dialogue Writer	Sun TV
