= Sukanya (actress) =

Indian Bharatnatyam dancer, film actress, music composer

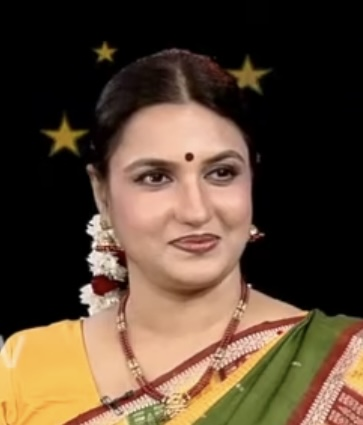
- Sukanya in 2020
- Born: Sukanya Ramesh; 25 November 1972 (age 53); Chennai, Tamil Nadu, India
- Occupations: Actress, dancer, singer, dubbing artist, composer, lyricist
- Years active: 1991–present
- Spouse: Sridhar Rajagopalan (m. 2002; sep. 2003)
- Awards: Kalaimamani

Sukanya (born 25 November 1972) is an Indian actress who mainly worked in Tamil, Malayalam, Kannada, Telugu and Hindi films. She is also a trained Bharatanatyam dancer, and has worked as a composer, lyricist and voice actress.

== Career ==
Sukanya made her debut in the Tamil movie Pudhu Nellu Pudhu Naathu (1991). She gained fame through films like Chinna Gounder (1992), Senthamizh Paattu (1992), Walter Vetrivel (1993), Mahanadhi (1994) and Indian (1996).

Some of Sukanya's Malayalam movies include Apaaratha (1992), Sagaram Sakshi (1994), Thooval Kottaram (1996), Chandralekha (1997), Rakthasakshikal Sindabad (1998), Vinayapoorvam Vidhyaadharan (2000), Udayon (2005), Innathe Chintha Vishayam (2008), Last Bench (2012), and Aamayum Muyalum (2014).

Sukanya's contribution to Telugu cinema consists of Peddarikam (1992) Amma Koduku (1994), Captain (1994), Sri (2005), Munna (2007), Adhinayakudu (2012) and Srimanthudu (2015).

She has also appeared on television shows such as Jannal: Ammavukku Rendula Ragu (2000–2001), Anandham (2003–2009), Swami Ayyappan (2006–2007) and Adhiparasakthi (2010). Known for her love towards hair and makeup, she can be seen on the sets of the TV show Anandham, doing her co-star's hairstyles. As a voice actress, she is known as the voice of Nandita Das in Kannathil Muthamittal (2002). She has also composed two devotional albums, namely Azhagu (2005) and Thirupathi Thirukudai Thiruvizha (2012).

== Personal life and family ==
Sukanya was born in Madras on 25 November 1972 to Ramesh, a film producer as the younger of two children. Both Sukanya as well as her older sister Geetha Sridhar have trained in Bharatanatyam at the Kalakshetra Foundation. Geetha runs the UK-based dance company Natyashri as part of which Sukanya has given dance performances. The film actress S. Jayalakshmi was her grandmother and actors S. Rajam and S. Balachander were her great-uncles.

Sukanya married R. Sridhar, a software engineer based in New Jersey on April 17, 2002. The two later separated and Sukanya filed for divorce on March 3, 2004, alleging domestic abuse. While Sridhar filed a Special Leave Petition on the divorce proceedings, arguing that he was not subject to Indian laws as he was a United States citizen, the plea was dismissed and the couple were granted a divorce in 2012.

Sukanya has described herself in interviews as a deeply religious person. She composed and sang a Tamil song Jai Shri Ram and released the album during the inauguration of the Ram temple in Ayodhya. In an interview to the website Galatta.com, Sukanya denied any intention to join politics or stand in elections.

== Filmography ==
=== Tamil ===
Year	Title	Role	Notes
1991	Pudhu Nellu Pudhu Naathu	Krishnaveni	Debut film
1991	MGR Nagaril	Shobana	
1992	Chinna Gounder	Deivanai	Tamil Nadu State Film Award for Best Actress; Cinema Express Award for Best Actress – Tamil
1992	Kottai Vaasal	Vasanthi	
1992	Thirumathi Palanisamy	Amsaveni	
1992	Thambi Pondatti	Sumathi	
1992	Senthamizh Paattu	Durgadevi	
1992	Ilavarasan	Poongothai	
1992	Solaiyamma	Solaiyamma	
1993	Chinna Mapillai	Janaki	
1993	Walter Vetrivel	Sumathi	Cinema Express Award for Best Actress – Tamil
1993	Udan Pirappu	Bhavani	
1993	Aadhityan	Rasathi	
1993	Sakkarai Devan	Sarasu	
1993	Karuppu Vellai	Swarna	
1993	Thalattu	Dr. Revathi	
1993	Chinna Jameen	Sathya	
1994	Seeman	Bakkiyam	
1994	Vandicholai Chinraasu	Parvathi	
1994	Mahanadhi	Yamuna	
1994	Raja Pandi	Rani Bhuvana	
1994	Hero	Seetha	
1995	Mr. Madras	Meera	
1996	Mahaprabhu	Mahalakshmi	
1996	Puthiya Parasakthi	Parasakthi	
1996	Indian	Amirthavalli	
1996	Parivattam	Mahalakshmi	
1996	Senathipathi	Meenakshi	
1996	Gnanapazham	Aarthi	
1997	Aahaa	Geetha	
1997	Gopura Deepam	Meena	
1997	Thambi Durai	Shenbagam	
2000	Good Luck	Devi	
2000	Unnai Kodu Ennai Tharuven	Surya's mother	
2001	Krishna Krishna	Bama	
2002	Sri Bannari Amman	Dancer	Special appearance
2004	Adi Thadi	Mrs.Surya	
2004	Campus	Priya	
2006	Sillunu Oru Kaadhal	Nirmala	
2007	Thottal Poo Malarum	Periya Naayagi	
2008	Aayudham Seivom	Leelavathi	
2008	Ellam Avan Seyal	LK's sister	
2009	Azhagar Malai	Dancer	Guest appearance
2014	Chandra	Queen Sarala Devi	
2014	Ennamo Nadakkudhu	Gayathri	
2016	Jambulingam 3D	Sadhana	
2017	Motta Shiva Ketta Shiva	Shiva's mother	
2017	Inayathalam	Chandrika	
2019	Thirumanam	Manonmani	
2023	Thee Ivan	Lakshmi	

=== Malayalam ===
Year	Film	Role	Notes
1992	Apaaratha	Surya	
1994	Sagaram Sakshi	Nirmala	
1996	Thooval Kottaram	Sujatha	Choreography also
1996	Kaanaakkinaavu	Sathi	
1997	Chandralekha	Chandra/Chandrika Varma	
1998	Rakthasakshikal Sindabad	Sivakami Ammal	
1998	Manjukalavum Kazhinju	Shobha	
1998	Amma Ammaayiyamma	Prabhavati	
1999	Swastham Grihabharanam	Ashwathi	
1999	Prem Poojari	Herself	Guest appearance
2000	Vinayapoorvam Vidhyaadharan	Shalini	
2004	Kanninum Kannadikkum	Herself	Guest appearance
2005	Udayon	Susiemol	
2006	Notebook	Sridevi's mother	
2008	Innathe Chintha Vishayam	Treesa	Filmfare Award for Best Supporting Actress – Malayalam
2012	Last Bench	Rosili	
2012	The Hitlist	Cameo	
2013	Manikya Thamburattiyum Christmas Carolum	Step-mother	
2014	My Life Partner	Dr. Leela Iyer	
2014	Aamayum Muyalum	Bhandaravathi	
2026	Varavu	Sister Daisy	

=== Telugu ===
Year	Film	Role	Notes
1992	Peddarikam	Janaki	
1992	Amma Koduku	Rajakumari	
1994	Captain	Uma	Partially reshot in Tamil
1994	Khaidi No. 1	Seetha	
2004	Samba	Pasupathi's wife	
2005	Sri	Sriram's mother	
2007	Munna	Kakha's second wife	
2012	Adhinayakudu	Ramakrishna Prasad's wife	
2015	Srimanthudu	Harsha Vardhan's mother	

=== Kannada ===
Year	Film	Role	Notes
1992	Guru Brahma	Uma, Suma	Dual role
2013	Chandra	Queen Sarala Devi	

=== Singer ===
Year	Film / Album	Song	Notes
2001	Krishna Krishna	"Thalli Vechu"	
2005	Azhagu		Only lyrics and music
2012	Thirupati Thirukkural Thiruvizha	"Ashtalakshmi"	
2024	DNA		Lyrics

=== As dubbing artist ===
- 2002 – Kannathil Muthamittal (for Nandita Das) – Tamil film

== Television ==
Year	Title	Role	Channel	Language	Notes
1996	Judgement	Director		Tamil	Telefilm
1999–2000	Jannal Marabu Kavithaigal	Saroja	Sun TV	Tamil	
2000–2001	Jannal: Ammavukku Rendula Ragu	Mythili	Sun TV	Tamil	
2000–2001	Aaya	Vadivamma	DD Podhigai	Tamil	
2003–2009	Anandham	Shanthi	Sun TV; Zee Tamizh	Tamil	(Re-telecast) 2014 – 2015
2004–2005	Kadamattathu Kathanar	Neeli	Asianet; Asianet Plus	Malayalam	(Re-telecast) 2016 – 2017
2005	Kadalinakkare	Sukanya	Asianet	Malayalam	
2005	Devi		Surya TV	Malayalam	
2006–2007	Swami Ayyappan	Panthalam Maharani	Asianet; Asianet Plus	Malayalam	(Re-telecast) 2016 – 2017
2008	20 million Apple Star	Judge	Jeevan TV	Malayalam	
2010	Adhiparasakthi	Adiparashakthi	Raj TV	Tamil	(Re-telecast) 2017
2011–2012	Appanum Aathalum		Kalaignar TV	Tamil	
2012	Super Kudumbam	Judge	Sun TV	Tamil	
2014	Uravugal Sangamam	Singer	Raj TV	Tamil	
2017	Odi Vilayadu Papa	Judge	Kalaingar TV	Tami	
2019	Comedy Stars season 2	Judge	Asianet	Malayalam	
2024	Shakthi IPS	Nurse Dharani	DD Podhigai	Tamil	
