= List of programs broadcast by Raj TV =

The following is a list of programs broadcast by Raj TV

== Currently broadcast ==
=== Retelecast ===
- Savaale Samaali
- Nilaivai Pidippom

=== Dubbed soap opera ===
Serial Name	First Aired	No.of episodes
Mann Vasanai	7 May 2012	700+
Poovizhi Vasalile	Before 2020	500+

=== Reality ===
- 24 Frames
- Comedy Galatta
- Masala Cafe
- Isai Chakaravarthy MSV - Spl Documentary
- Cinema Cafe
- Thim Tharigida - Classic Dancer's Show
- Thirai Vaanil
- Super Samaiyal
- Micro Cinema
- Naanum Cinemavum - Interviews
- Ka Ka Ga Po Comedy Skit
- Kasumazhai – Game show
- Gunamakkum Anbu
- Jesus Calls
- Cinema Paarvai
- Kaiyalavu Ulagam

== Formerly broadcast ==
=== Soap operas ===
Year	Serial	Notes	No. of episodes
1998–2001	Marmadesam		453
2001	Ramany vs Ramany Part 02		51
2005–2009	Aarthi		1054
2006–2008	Ganga Yamuna Saraswati		491
2009–2010	Adhiparasakthi		41
2009–2010	Karunamanjari		182
2009–2010	Jai Shri Krishna	Dubbing of Colors TV serial Jai Shri Krishna	290
2008–2009	Savaale Samaali		133
2009–2011	Geetanjali		818
2010–2011	Veetukku Veedu		120
2010–2011	Kodi Mullai		520
2012–2015	Karuthamma	Dubbing of Colors serial Na Aana Is Des Laado	870
2013	Bhama Vijayam	Dubbing of Doordarshan; STAR Plus serial Tu Tu Main Main	169
2013–2014	Nilave Malare	Dubbing of Sony Entertainment Television India serial Parvarrish – Kuchh Khattee Kuchh Meethi	388
2013–2015	Gouravam	Dubbing of Colors serial Sanskaar - Dharohar Apnon Ki	331
2014	Uravugal Sangamam		186
2014–2015	Alaipayuthey	Dubbing of Colors serial Beintehaa	235
2014–2015	En Iniya Thozhiye		332
2015–2016	En Thangai		205
2015–2016	Azhagiya Laila	Dubbing of Colors serial Rangrasiya	188
2016–2016	Sabitha Allies Sabapathi		76
2010–2016	Sindhu Bhairavi	Dubbing of Colors serial Uttaran	1549
2015–2016	Kanchana	Dubbing of Colors serial Shastri Sisters	329
2016–2017	Arundathi		75
2016–2017	Kakka Kakka		127
2016–2018	Ganga Yamuna	Dubbing of Colors Serial Swaragini	469
2016–2018	Indira	Dubbing of Colors Serial Thapki Pyar Ki	536 Episodes-STOPPED
2021	Ananthi		131
2021–2022	Nee Varuvai Ena		266
2021–2022	Geethanjali		115

=== Soap opera ===
- Kadal Kadandhu Udhyogam
- Gangadharanai Kanom
- Kannamma
- Hello Shyamala
- Nalam Nalam Ariya Aval

=== Other shows ===
- Beach Girls
- Tanishq Swarna Sangeetham
- Airtel Star Singer
- Gold Casino
- Tamil Pesum Kadhanayagi
- Super Dancer
- Chennaiyil Thiruvaiyaaru
- Go Skool
- Kaasu Malai
- Dhoom-Dare If You Can
- Endrendrum Ravikumar
- Rajageetham
- Masala Cafe
- Parambarai Vaithiyam
- Kollywood buzz
- Madhura Geetham
- Masala Cafe
- Movie Cafe
- Mega 10 Movies
- Shivaji Rao To Kabali - A Story of the Legend

=== Awards ===
- Raj Mudhalavan Awards
- Raj Moodal Moovar
- Women Achiever Awards 2015
- MGR-Shivaji Tele Awards
- Abirami Awards 2016 Dubai

== List of movies ==
- Muthuramalingam
- Semma Botha Aagathey
- Dhoni Kabadi Kuzhu
- Aaranyam
- Savarikaadu
- Achaaram
- Ulagam Sutrum Valiban
- Chinna Chinna Kannile
- Sigamani Ramamani
- Kadhalna Summa Illai
- Mariyadhai
- Magane En Marumagane
- Minnale
- Karnan (1964)
- Adimai Penn (1969)
- Neeya? (1979)
- Netrikkan (1981)
- Puthukavithai (1982)
- Agni Sakshi (1982)
- Poikkal Kudhirai (1983)
- Naan Mahaan Alla (1984)
- Enakkul Oruvan (1984)
- Sri Raghavendrar (1985)
- Sindhu Bhairavi (1985)
- Velaikaran (1987)
- Achamillai Achamillai (1984)
- Kalyana Agathigal (1985)
- Punnagai Mannan (1986)
- Manathil Uruthi Vendum (1987)
- Unnal Mudiyum Thambi (1988)
- Pudhu Pudhu Arthangal (1989)
- Oru Veedu Iru Vaasal (1990)
- Vaaname Ellai (1992)
- Jaathi Malli (1993)
- Duet (1994)
- Pudhiavan (1984)
- Poovilangu (1984)
- Vanna Kanavugal (1987)
- Siva (1989)
- Unnai Solli Kutramillai (1990)
- Manal Kayiru (1983)
- Aval Sumangalithan (1985)
- Thirumathi Oru Vegumathi (1986)
- Penmani Aval Kanmani (1988)
- Varavu Nalla Uravu (1990)
- Nee Pathi Naan Pathi (1991)
- Anney Anney (1983)
- Sigaram (1991)
- Annaamalai (1992)
- Roja (1992)
- Thenali
- Varalaru
- Idaya Kovil (1985)
- Mouna Ragam (1986)
- Nayakan (1987)
- Agni Natchathiram (1988)
- Idhayathai Thirudaathe (1989)
- Anjali (1990)
- Thalapathi (1991)
- Raavanan (2010)
- Neeya?
- 12B
- Rajaraja Cholan
- Nadodi Mannan
- Enga Mama
- Amara Kaaviyam
- Vaanathaipola
- Ninaivellam Nithya
- Lorry Driver Rajakannu
- Aruvadai Naal
- Anand
- My Dear Marthandan
- Mannan
- Kalaignan
- Thalattu Ketkuthamma
- Rajakumaran
- Magic Magic 3D
- Well Done
- Ragasiya Police 115
- Chinna Mul Periya Mul
- Anbu
- Nammavar
- Uzhaippali
- Kallazhagar
- Madrasi
- Akilan
- Aavathellam Pennaale
- Aayiram Muthangal
- Nangooram
- Ponmaanai Thedi
- Deiva Kuzhandhai
- Jeevanadhi
- Siragadikka Aasai
- Naan Pudicha Mappillai
- Kizhakku Veluthachu
- Anicha Malar
- Anthi Mayakkam
- Aayiram Pookkal Malarattum
- Kashmir Kadhali
- Chinna Poovai Killathe
- Krishnan Vandhaan
- Kannan Oru Kai Kuzhandhai
- Enga Chinna Ponnu
- Five Star
- Engitta Mothathay
- Indru Mudhal
- I Love You Da
- Veerapandiya Kattabomman
- Pudhiya Theerppu
- Pudhu Varusham
- Kasi Yathirai
- Mannukkul Vairam
- Thaaiku Oru Thaalaattu
- Ilamai Kaalangal
- Naan Paadum Paadal
- Unnai Naan Santhithen
- Udaya Geetham
- Aayiram Pookkal Malarattum
- Mangai Oru Gangai
- Guru
- Rajadhi Raja
- Singaravelan
- Anandha Kanneer
- Marumagal
- Saadhanai
- Miruthanga Chakravarthi
- Neethibathi
- Imaigal
- Oorum Uravum
- Sandhippu
- Uruvangal Maralam
- Thyagi
- Thunai
- ABCD
- Garuda Saukiyama
- Natchathiram
- Shakalaka Baby
- Maaran
- Padai Veetu Amman
- Gummalam
- April Maadhathil
- Mutham
- Iravu Paadagan
- Style
- Kalatpadai
- Julie Ganapathi
- Kalvanin Kaadhali
- Naam
