= Uzhaithu Vaazha Vendum =

1988 film by Ameerjan

- Poster
- Directed by: Ameerjan
- Story by: Liaquat Ali Khan
- Produced by: Kovaithambi
- Starring: Vijayakanth; Radhika
- Cinematography: C. S. Ravibabu
- Edited by: S. S. Nazir
- Music by: Devendran
- Production company: Motherland Pictures
- Release date: 8 November 1988
- Running time: 143 minutes
- Country: India
- Language: Tamil

Uzhaithu Vaazha Vendum (transl. Live by toiling) is a 1988 Indian Tamil-language action film directed by Ameerjan. The film stars Vijayakanth and Radhika, with Radha Ravi, Delhi Ganesh and Vadivukkarasi in supporting roles. It was released on 8 November 1988.

== Plot ==
Tired father Subbaiah drives a cycle rickshaw to provide food for the family. The mother Thangamma serves as maid and cook in another house-her bit to make ends meet though they never seem to. His girl Rani sells flowers. His younger kid brother is shown delivering newspapers or shining shoes. All their hopes hinge on the hero, Raja. He does not most of the time get as near as an interview. He saved a blind man who was injured by the wayward car of rich man's Chandrasekhar arrogant daughter Sandhya.

When he does get to an interview, and thanks to his rickshaw-man father Subbaiah is in the know of the password that will fetch him a job at last, at long last, he ends up with the dhaanam of his job to another Raja, in his opinion more needy candidate. And as if this was not enough, for a month he is giving his people to understand that he has taken the job. And because he has no degree in social work, meaning he is not qualified to do his job, what with our modernday obsession for specialisation, there is no place except a film script where he can be made to work.

His relationship with his lady-love Sandhya, the rich and arrogant shrew, traces a flipflop graph this way. Raja cycle rickshaw is dismembered by the fury of a gang of hired goons. they drive their van over what remains of the cycle. By the time things have come to this pass, the shrew, tired after all this rickety and rumbustious ride turns a devout Tamil (Hindu) wife.

== Cast ==
- Vijayakanth as Raja
- Radhika as Sandhya
- Radha Ravi as Arun
- Delhi Ganesh as Subbaiah
- Vadivukkarasi as Thangamma
- Jai Ganesh as Chandrasekhar
- Raja as Raja
- S. S. Chandran as Peter
- Senthil as Peter's employee
- Charle as Chellappa
- Sunitha as Rani
- Poornam Viswanathan as Santhosham
- Typist Gopu as Chandrasekhar's employee
- LIC Narasimhan as Cyclerickshaw's customer
- Sunitha as sister of Raja

== Production ==
The film was launched at Prasad Studios along with song recording.

== Soundtrack ==
Soundtrack was composed by Devendran and lyrics were written by Vairamuthu.

Track listing
No.	Title	Singer(s)	Length
1.	"Muthukkal Pathikkatha Kannil"	K. J. Yesudas, K. S. Chithra
2.	"Bhoomi Yenna Bhoomi"	Malaysia Vasudevan
3.	"Life Is Funny"	Anuradha, S. P. Balasubrahmanyam
4.	"Ponmangani Idu Ini En Magani"	S. P. Balasubrahmanyam, K. S. Chithra, Dinesh, Soundararajan
5.	"Vangi Vanden"	K. J. Yesudas
6.	"Vennilavai Mudhal Naal"	S. P. Balasubrahmanyam

== Release and reception ==
Uzhaithu Vaazha Vendum was released on 8 November 1988. N. Krishnaswamy of The Indian Express in his review dated 11 November 1988 called "Devendran's music, Liaqat Ali Khan's dialogues and most of all Super Subbarayan's stunt direction" as plus points.
