= Karuppu Vellai =

1993 film by Manobala

- Poster
- Directed by: Manobala
- Written by: Ananthu (dialogues)
- Screenplay by: Manobala
- Story by: Manobala
- Produced by: B. Venkatrama Reddy
- Starring: Rahman; Sukanya; Nassar; Thilakan
- Cinematography: U. K. Senthil Kumar
- Edited by: M. N. Raja
- Music by: Deva
- Production company: Chanthamama Vijaya Combines
- Release date: 7 October 1993
- Running time: 134 minutes
- Country: India
- Language: Tamil

Karuppu Vellai (transl. Black and white) is a 1993 Indian Tamil-language legal drama film, directed by Manobala and produced by B. Venkatrama Reddy. The film stars Rahman, Sukanya, Nassar and Thilakan. It was released on 7 October 1993.

== Cast ==
- Rahman as Surya
- Sukanya as Swarna
- Nassar as Kalyanasundaram
- Thilakan as Sathyamoorthy
- Srividya as Gayathri
- Vennira Aadai Moorthy
- Malaysia Vasudevan as Kalimuthu
- Charle
- Mohan Raman
- Periya Karuppu Thevar
- Kullamani
- Ennatha Kannaiya
- Krishnamurthy
- D. Soundar
- Rama Vasu
- G. K.
- Master Udayaraj
- Radhakumari Kondalrao
- Baby Monisha
- Vellai Subbaiah
- Pasi Narayanan

== Soundtrack ==
The music was composed by Deva.

Song	Singers	Lyrics	Length
"Oh Swarnamuki"	S. P. Balasubrahmanyam, K. S. Chithra	Kalidasan	4:48
"Muthuthoraname"	S. Janaki	Kalidasan	4:12
"Neram Nalla Neram"	S. P. Balasubrahmanyam	Shiva	4:11
"Azhagaana"	S. P. Balasubrahmanyam, K. S. Chithra	Kalidasan	2:30
"Sathiyame Jayamaagum"	S. P. Balasubrahmanyam, K. S. Chithra	Kalidasan	6:26
"Bolu Bolu"	Sundharrajan, S. Janaki	Kalidasan	4:38

== Reception ==
R. P. R. of Kalki called the film a return to form for Manobala. K. N. Vijiyan of New Straits Times said the film should "satisfy those who like court dramas".
