= Kavithalayaa Productions =

Indian film production and distribution company

Kavithalayaa Productions Private Limited
- Type: Film production Film distribution
- Industry: Entertainment
- Founded: 1981
- Founder: K. Balachander
- Headquarters: Chennai, India
- Key people: K. Balachander; Rajam Balachander; Pushpa Kandaswamy; Prassana Satish; Kandaswamy Bharathan; Eshwran Vijayaraghavan

Kavithalayaa Productions is an Indian film production and distribution company based in Chennai. It was founded by filmmaker K. Balachander in 1981. It has a library of 50+ films in three languages and 3500+ hours of television content. Kavithalayaa is currently releasing the older serials in YouTube including Thuru Pidikkum Manasu.

== History ==
In 1981, Kavithalayaa Productions was founded by the filmmaker and Dadasaheb Phalke awardee K. Balachander. Having produced over 50 films, many of them being huge hits, they also have provided 3500+ hours of television content, through TV serials and vertical content.

Having been involved with film and telivision over three decades, Kavithalayaa entered digital and social media space, releasing their maiden digital series Harmony with A. R. Rahman on Prime video India.

The failure of Kuselan (2008) directly impacted the progress of the studio's other films, which were in production. Two films which they were producing by director Selva, Nootrukku Nooru with Vinay, Sneha and Sandhya, and Muriyadi with Sathyaraj, Ganesh Venkatraman and Remya Nambeesan were shelved, despite commencing production. Likewise, Shelvan's Krishnaleelai featuring Jeevan and Meghana Raj, was also cancelled. The director of the film threatened to hold an indefinite fast against the production house's reluctance to release the film in 2011, but to no avail.

== Filmography ==
| Year | Film | Language | Cast | Director | Notes |
|---|---|---|---|---|---|
| 1981 | Netrikan | Tamil | Rajinikanth, Lakshmi, Saritha | S. P. Muthuraman | |
| 1982 | Pudukavithai | Tamil | Rajinikanth, Jyothi, Sukumari | S.P. Muthuraman | |
| 1982 | Manal Kayiru | Tamil | | Visu | |
| 1982 | Agni Sakshi | Tamil | | K. Balachander | Tamil Nadu State Film Award for Second Best Film |
| 1983 | Benkiyalli Aralida Hoovu | Kannada | Suhasini | K. Balachander | |
| 1983 | Poikkal Kudhirai | Tamil | | K. Balachander | |
| 1983 | Anney Anney | Tamil | Mouli | Mouli | |
| 1984 | Naan Mahaan Alla | Tamil | Rajinikanth, Radha | S.P. Muthuraman | |
| 1984 | Poovilangu | Tamil | Murali | Ameerjan | |
| 1984 | Achamillai Achamillai | Tamil | Rajesh, Saritha | K. Balachander | National Film Award for Best Feature Film in Tamil; Filmfare Award for Best Tamil Film |
| 1984 | Eradu Rekhegalu | Kannada | | K. Balachander | |
| 1984 | Pudhiavan | Tamil | Murali, Anitha, Raveendran | Ameerjan | |
| 1984 | Enakkul Oruvan | Tamil | Kamal Haasan | S.P. Muthuraman | |
| 1985 | Kalyana Agathigal | Tamil | Saritha | K. Balachander | |
| 1985 | Aval Sumangalithaan | Tamil | Karthik, Ilavarasi, Visu | Visu | |
| 1985 | Mugila Mallige | Kannada | Srinath | K. Balachander | |
| 1985 | Sri Raghavendrar | Tamil | Rajinikanth, Vishnuvardhan, Lakshmi | S.P. Muthuraman | |
| 1985 | Sindhu Bhairavi | Tamil | | K. Balachander | Filmfare Award for Best Tamil Film |
| 1986 | Sundara Swapnagalu | Kannada | Ramesh Aravind | K. Balachander | |
| 1986 | Punnagai Mannan | Tamil | Kamal Haasan, Rekha, Revathi | K. Balachander | |
| 1987 | Thirumathi Oru Vegumathi | Tamil | | Visu | |
| 1987 | Velaikaran | Tamil | Rajinikanth, Amala | S.P. Muthuraman | |
| 1987 | Vanna Kanavugal | Tamil | Karthik, Murali, Jayashree, Tara | Ameerjan | |
| 1987 | Manathil Uruthi Vendum | Tamil | | K. Balachander | |
| 1988 | Penmani Aval Kanmani | Tamil | Prathap Pothen, Seetha, Visu | Visu | |
| 1988 | Unnal Mudiyum Thambi | Tamil | Kamal Haasan, Seetha | K. Balachander | |
| 1989 | Siva | Tamil | Rajinikanth, Raghuvaran, Shobana | Ameerjan | |
| 1989 | Pudhu Pudhu Arthangal | Tamil | Rahman, Sithara, Geetha, Vivek | K. Balachander | Tamil Nadu State Film Award for Second Best Film |
| 1989 | Unnai Solli Kutramillai | Tamil | Karthik, Sithara | Ameerjan | |
| 1990 | Varavu Nalla Uravu | Tamil | Sunitha, Visu, Rekha | Visu | |
| 1990 | Oru Veedu Iru Vasal | Tamil | | K. Balachander | National Film Award for Best Film on Other Social Issues |
| 1991 | Sigaram | Tamil | S. P. Balasubrahmanyam | Ananthu | |
| 1991 | Nee Pathi Naan Pathi | Tamil | Rahman, Gautami, Heera | Vasanth | 25th Film |
| 1992 | Vaaname Ellai | Tamil | Anand Babu, Bhanupriya, Ramya Krishnan, Madhoo | K. Balachander | |
| 1992 | Annaamalai | Tamil | Rajinikanth, Khushbu, Sarath Babu | Suresh Krissna | |
| 1992 | Roja | Tamil | Arvind Swamy, Madhoo | Mani Ratnam | Nargis Dutt Award for Best Feature Film on National Integration; Filmfare Award for Best Tamil Film; Tamil Nadu State Film Award for Best Film |
| 1993 | Jathi Malli | Tamil | Mukesh, Khushbu, Vineeth | K. Balachander | Tamil Nadu State Film Award for Best Film |
| 1994 | Duet | Tamil | Prabhu, Ramesh Arvind | K. Balachander | |
| 1995 | Muthu | Tamil | Rajinikanth, Meena, Sarath Babu | K. S. Ravikumar | |
| 1996 | Kalki | Tamil | Rahman, Prakash Raj, Shruti, Geetha | K. Balachander | |
| 1997 | Vidukathai | Tamil | Prakash Raj | Agathiyan | |
| 1998 | Thulli Thirindha Kaalam | Tamil | Arun Vijay, Khushbu | Balasekaran | |
| 1998 | Pooveli | Tamil | Karthik, Kausalya | Selva | |
| 1999 | Rojavanam | Tamil | Karthik, Laila | Selva | |
| 2000 | Rajakali Amman | Tamil | Ramya Krishnan | Rama Narayanan | |
| 2000 | Appu | Tamil | Prashanth, Devayani | Vasanth | |
| 2001 | Sri Raja Rajeshwari | Tamil | Ramya Krishnan, Ramki | Bharathi Kannan | |
| 2001 | Parthale Paravasam | Tamil | Madhavan, Simran, R. Lawrence, Sneha, Kamal Haasan | K. Balachander | |
| 2002 | Album | Tamil | Aryan Rajesh, Shrutika | Vasanthabalan | |
| 2003 | Saamy | Tamil | Vikram, Trisha | Hari | |
| 2003 | Thirumalai | Tamil | Vijay, Jyothika, Raghuvaran | Ramana | |
| 2005 | Ayya | Tamil | R. Sarathkumar, Nayantara | Hari | |
| 2006 | Idhaya Thirudan | Tamil | Jayam Ravi, Kamna Jethmalani, Prakash Raj | Saran | |
| 2008 | Kuselan | Tamil | Rajinikanth, Pasupathy, Meena | P. Vasu | |
| 2008 | Thiruvanamalai | Tamil | Arjun Sarja, Pooja Gandhi | Perarasu | |
| 2026 | Lucky the Superstar | Tamil | G. V. Prakash Kumar, Anaswara Rajan, Meghna Sumesh | Uday Mahesh | |

== Series ==
=== Television ===
| Years | Series | Director (S) | Original Network | Language (s) | Cast |
| 1989 | Rail Sneham | K. Balachander | DD Podhigai | Tamil | Nizhalgal Ravi |
| 1995 | Kaiyalavu Manasu | K. Balachander | Sun TV | Tamil | Prakash Raj, Geetha |
| 1996 | Kadhal Pagadai | K. Balachander | Sun TV | Tamil | Rahman, Mohini |
| 1996 | Marmadesam - Ragasiyam | Naga | Sun TV | Tamil | Ramji, Prithviraj |
| 1997 | Marmadesam - Vidathu Karuppu | Naga | Sun TV | Tamil | Chetan, Devadarshini |
| 1998 | Premi | K. Balachander | Sun TV | Tamil | Renuka |
| 1998 | Ramani vs Ramani - 1 | Naga | Sun TV | Tamil | Babloo Prithviraj, Vasuki |
| 1999 | Kasalavu Nesam | K. Balachander | Sun TV / Raj TV | Tamil | Venu Aravind, Ramji |
| 1999 | Oonjal | | Vijay TV | Tamil | S. P. B. Charan |
| 1999 | Kadavulukku Kobam Vanthathu | Sundar K. Vijayan | DD Podhigai | Tamil | Viji Chandrasekar |
| 1999 | Jannal: Marabu Kavithaigal | K. Balachander, Vedham Puthithu Kannan | Raj TV | Tamil | Sukanya, Kuyili, Ravikumar, T. V. Varadarajan |
| 1999 | Jannal: Adutha Veetu Kavithai | K. Balachander | Raj TV | Tamil | S. P. Balasubrahmanyam, Lakshmi, Poovilangu Mohan |
| 2000 | Marmadesam - Sorna Regai | C. J. Bhaskar | Raj TV | Tamil | Poovilangu Mohan, Delhi Ganesh, Thalaivasal Vijay |
| 2000 | K. B. in Chinnathirai | | Raj TV | Tamil | |
| 2000 | Marmadesam - Iyanthira Paravai | C. J. Bhaskar | Raj TV | Tamil | |
| 2001 | Marmadesam - Edhuvum Nadakkum | Naga | Raj TV | Tamil | |
| 2001 | Irandaam Chanakyan | Bombay Chanakyan | Raj TV | Tamil | Venu Aravind |
| 2001 | Ramani vs Ramani - 2 | Naga | Raj TV | Tamil | Ramji, Devadarshini |
| 2001 | Guhan | Sundar K. Vijayan | Raj TV | Tamil | Ravi Raghavendra |
| 2003 | Anni | Samuthirakani | Jaya TV | Tamil | Malavika Avinash |
| 2004 | Ethir Neechal | | Jaya TV | Tamil | |
| 2005 | Nilavai Pidippom | | Raj TV | Tamil | Malavika Avinash |
| 2005 | Devathai | | Raj TV | Tamil | |
| 2005 | Idhu Oru Kaadhal Kadhai | | Vijay TV | Tamil | |
| 2007 | Naan Ava Illeengo | | Kalaignar TV | Tamil | |
| 2008 | Thenmozhiyaal | | Kalaignar TV | Tamil | |
| 2009 | Sollathan Ninaikkiren | | Zee Tamil | Tamil | |
| 2009 | Comedy Colony | C. Ranganathan | Jaya TV | Tamil | |

=== Web series ===
| Years | Series | Director (S) | Original Network | Language (s) | Cast |
| 2018 | Harmony with A.R.Rahman | Sruti Harihara Subramanian | Amazon Prime Video | English, Malayalam, Meitei, Sikkimese | A.R.Rahman, Kalamandalam Sajith Vijayan, Ustad Mohi Baha'uddin Dagar, Lourembam Bedabati, Mickma Tshering Lepcha |
| 2020 | Time Enna Boss | | Amazon Prime Video | Tamil | Bharath, Priya Bhavani Shankar, Alex, Karunakaran and Robo Shankar |
| 2022 | Ramany vs Ramany 3.0 | Naga | Aha Tamil | Tamil | Ramji, Vasuki |

== Awards ==
| Movies | Awards | Year | Outcome |
| Agnisatchi | Tamil Nadu State Film Award for Second Best Film | 1982 | Won |
| Achamillai Achamillai | National Film Award for Best Feature Film in Tamil Filmfare Award for Best Film – Tamil | 1985 | Won |
| Pudhu Pudhu Arthangal | Tamil Nadu State Film Award for Second Best Film | 1989 | Won |
| Oru Veedu Iru Vasal | National Film Award for Best Film on Other Social Issues | 1991 | Won |
| Vaaname Ellai | Tamil Nadu State Film Award Special Prize | 1992 | Won |
| Roja | Nargis Dutt Award for Best Feature Film on National Integration Tamil Nadu State Film Award for Best Film Filmfare Award for Best Film – Tamil | 1993 | Won |
| Jaathi Malli | Tamil Nadu State Film Award for Best Film | 1993 | Won |
