= Sikaram =

1991 film by Ananthu

- Theatrical release poster
- Directed by: Ananthu
- Written by: Ananthu
- Produced by: Rajam Balachander; Pushpa Kandaswamy
- Starring: S. P. Balasubrahmanyam; Radha; Rekha
- Cinematography: R. Raghunatha Reddy
- Edited by: Ganesh Kumar
- Music by: S. P. Balasubrahmanyam
- Production company: Kavithalayaa Productions
- Release date: 11 January 1991
- Running time: 140 minutes
- Country: India
- Language: Tamil

Sikaram (transl. Peak) is a 1991 Indian Tamil-language musical drama film directed by Ananthu and produced by Kavithalayaa Productions. The film stars S. P. Balasubrahmanyam (who composed this film's music), Rekha and Radha. It was released on 11 January 1991.

== Plot ==
Damodar is a famous music director and playback singer who has won many awards. Gnanam, the man behind his success, works hard for his breakthrough and he now considers Damodar as his archenemy. Damodar's son Krishna is a drunkard and spoils his life by drinking alcohol. In the past, Krishna was in love with Aparna, but there was a difference of opinion between the two, so they separated.

Later, Sukanya, Damodar's wife, dies by falling off the stairs. Damodar then fell ill and Dr.Priya takes care of him. Priya was a fan of Damodar and they were in love when they were young.

By this time, Gnanam steals Damodar's records (music notes) from his studio and becomes one of the top music directors. Damodar recovers and Priya make an attempt to reform Krishna. She meets Aparna to talk about Krishna. Aparna admitted that she was cheated by her friend and she attempted to commit suicide but she failed to because she cannot forget her lover Krishna. Gnanam apologises to Damodar for his misdeeds. Finally, Krishna marries Aparna, and Damodar and Priya also marry.

== Cast ==
- S. P. Balasubrahmanyam as Damodar
- Radha as Priya
- Rekha as Sukanya
- Anand Babu as Krishna
- Ramya Krishnan as Aparna
- Nizhalgal Ravi as Gnanam
- Charle as Madhavan
- Lalitha Kumari
- Delhi Ganesh as Sachidhanandam
- Nassar in a guest appearance
- Pyramid Natarajan in a guest appearance
- Mano in a guest appearance
- Babloo Prithiveeraj in a guest appearance

== Production ==
Sikaram marked the directorial debut of Ananthu. He said he wrote this script in 1985.

== Soundtrack ==
The soundtrack was composed by S. P. Balasubrahmanyam, who also played the lead role, with lyrics written by Vairamuthu. The song "Itho Itho En Pallavi" is based on "Priya Priya Vinodave" from the 1987 Kannada film Sowbhagya Lakshmi, composed by Balasubrahmanyam. The song "Muthamma Ennai" is based on "Happy Together" by the Turtles, while the first line of "Vannam Konda" was inspired by the Hindi song "Kabhi Khud Pe" which was composed by Jaidev for the film Hum Dono (1961). It is set in Pilu, a Hindustani raga.

Song	Singer(s)	Duration
"Agaram Ippo"	K. J. Yesudas	5:11
"Iduppu Kudangal"	Mano	1:16
"Itho Itho En Pallavi"	S. P. Balasubrahmanyam, K. S. Chithra	4:39
"Jannalil"	S. P. Sailaja	5:29
"Muthamma Ennai"	S. N. Surendar, S. P. Sailaja	4:21
"Nithiyathil Erupeerum"	S. P. Balasubrahmanyam	1:26
"Panchali Katharukiral"	M. Balamuralikrishna	2:27
"Petrathaithanai"	S. P. Sailaja	1:19
"Puliku Piranthavane"	S. P. Balasubrahmanyam	1:49
"Sangeethame Sannedi"	Instrumental	4:28
"Unnai Kanda Pinpu" (female)	K. S. Chithra	3:01
"Unnai Kanda Pinpu" (male)	S. P. Balasubrahmanyam	2:28
"Vannam Konda" (solo)	S. P. Balasubrahmanyam	5:05
"Vannam Konda" (duet)	S. P. Balasubrahmanyam, S. P. Sailaja	1:53
"Vannam Konda" (chorus)	Chorus	0:43

== Release and reception ==
Sikaram was released on 11 January 1991. N. Krishnaswamy of The Indian Express wrote on 25 January, "The script bristles with humorous [sic] as well as tragic sequences, and if there is something to quarrel with it is the way it is structured." C. R. K. of Kalki wrote that though the songs were melodious, they were too many. The film was a commercial success, with Balasubrahmanyam attributing it to Vairamuthu's lyrics and Yesudas' singing. Balasubrahmanyam won the Film Fans Association Award for Best Music Director.
