= Vanakkam Vathiyare =

- Title card
- Directed by: Ameerjan
- Written by: Ameerjan; Vairamuthu
- Produced by: P. S. V. Hariharan
- Starring: Karthik; Saranya; Radha Ravi
- Cinematography: C. S. Ravi Babu
- Edited by: S. S. Nazir
- Music by: V. R. Sampath Selvam
- Production company: PSV Pictures
- Release date: 1 February 1991
- Running time: 131 minutes
- Country: India
- Language: Tamil

Vanakkam Vathiyare (transl. Greetings teacher) is a 1991 Indian Tamil language action film directed by Ameerjan. The film stars Karthik and Saranya. It was released on 1 February 1991.

== Plot ==
Rajappa is a young man who earns his livelihood by engaging in rowdyism. Despite pleas from his mother to stop him from engaging in nefarious activities, Rajappa is adamant on pursuing rowdyism. However when his mother herself becomes a victim of his doings, Rajappa promises his dying mother that he would stop such activities and pursue a different life. He subsequently moves to a village with the intention of leading a quiet, stable life; but on arrival, he realises that the village remains full of terror.

The villagers are oppressed by a gangster Malaichami and his family, though honouring his promise to his mother, Rajappa chooses to remain silent. The village's main entrepreneur, Duraisingam, who has been a victim of Malaichami's cruel deeds, requests Rajappa to change his ways and deal with the gangster.

However, Rajappa refuses to commit himself and a helpless Duraisingam also gives up on his hope. Meanwhile, the atrocities of Malaichami grow wilder and uglier with every passing day and Rajappa is saddened by the plight of the villagers. He thinks of a way to deal with this terror without breaking his promise.

== Cast ==
- Karthik as Rajappa
- Saranya as Sundari
- Jaishankar as Duraisingam
- Radharavi as Malaichami
- Anuradha as Rosa
- Typist Gopu
- Thideer Kannaiah
- Gajapathi
- Shailaja
- Dharani
- Saleema
- Kala
- Vaathiyar Raman
- Gundu Kalyanam
- Nagarajachozhan
- Babu Mohan
- Naveen
- Kalyanji
- Master Manuraj
- Senji Krishnan
- MLA Mallliah
- Ravi Varma
- Sivaraman

== Production ==
The film began production in 1987. It was shot in places such as Hogenakkal and Thengumarahada. The scene where Karthik fights with a tiger was shot at a village called Kadambakudi.

== Music ==
The songs was composed by V. R. Sampath Selvam. The background score was composed by A. R. Rahman, in his debut. The song "Mettu Onnu" was recorded at AVM Studios.

Track listing
No.	Title	Singers	Length
1.	"Vanthayedam Nalla Yedam"	Sirkazhi G. Sivachidambaram	2:19
2.	"Selambu Suththanu Sernthu"	Malaysia Vasudevan	3:00
3.	"Mettu Onnu Kattatta Megampola"	Vani Jairam	5:21
4.	"Hey Silusilukkudu Kulukulukkudu"	S. P. Balasubrahmanyam	5:35
5.	"Hey Puliey Puliey Poraduda"	Malaysia Vasudevan, K. S. Chithra	5:29
6.	"Thudikidu Roasa Poo Rasa"	K. S. Chithra	4:41
Total length:			26:25
