= Thulasi (1987 film) =

- Directed by: Ameerjan
- Screenplay by: Ameerjaan
- Story by: K. Somasundareswar
- Produced by: P. S. V. Hariharan
- Starring: Murali; Seetha
- Cinematography: C. S. Ravibabu
- Edited by: S. S. Nazir
- Music by: Sampath Selvam
- Production company: Veeralakshmi Combines
- Release date: 27 November 1987
- Running time: 120 minutes
- Country: India
- Language: Tamil

Thulasi (transl. Basil) is a 1987 Indian Tamil-language romantic drama film directed by Ameerjan. The film stars Murali and Seetha. It was released on 27 November 1987.

== Plot ==
Thirunavukarasu is considered a god by his villagers. Nevertheless, his son Sammadham is an atheist and he doesn't believe in his father's power. Sammadham and Ponni, a low caste girl, fall in love with each other. Sammadham's best friend Siva, a low caste boy, passes the Master of Arts degree successfully. Thirunavukarasu's daughter Thulasi then develops a soft corner for Siva.

Thirunavukarasu cannot accept his son Sammadham's marriage with Ponni due to a caste difference. Sammadham then challenges him to marry her. Thirunavukarasu appoints henchmen to kill her and Ponni is found dead the next day in the water. In the meantime, Siva also falls in love with Thulasi. The rest of the story is what happens to Siva and Thulasi.

== Cast ==
- Murali as Sivalingam "Siva"
- Seetha as Thulasi
- Chandrasekhar as Sammadham
- Major Sundarrajan as Thirunavukarasu
- Senthil
- Charle as Khan
- Thara as Ponni
- Mohanapriya as Sarasu
- Vathiyar Raman
- A. K. Veerasamy as Kaliyappan

== Soundtrack ==
The music was composed by Sampath Selvam, with lyrics written by Vairamuthu.

Song	Singer(s)	Duration
"Anbe Idhu Kadhal"	S. P. Balasubrahmanyam, S.P. Sailaja	4:37
"Kathavu Thoranthu"	K. S. Chithra	4:08
"Ooraiellam"	K. J. Yesudas	4:45
"Vaa Vaa Pudhu"	S. P. Balasubrahmanyam	5:12

== Reception ==
The Indian Express gave a negative review calling it "thwarted love". Balumani of Anna praised acting, humour, cinematography and direction but found music to be average.
