= Chinna Chinna Kannile =

2000 film by Ameerjan

- Title card
- Directed by: Ameerjan
- Written by: Ameerjan; S. Robert (dialogues)
- Produced by: M. Rajendran; M. Rajaratnam; M. Ravindran; M. Raghunathan
- Starring: Prakash Raj; Khushbu; Nassar
- Cinematography: C. S. Ravibabu
- Edited by: S. S. Nazir
- Music by: Sampath Selvan
- Production company: Aadhi Bhagavan Films
- Release date: 1 September 2000
- Running time: 145 minutes
- Country: India
- Language: Tamil

Chinna Chinna Kannile is a 2000 Indian Tamil-language heist thriller film directed by Ameerjan. The film stars Prakash Raj, Khushbu and Nassar. It was released on 1 September 2000.

== Plot ==
Rathi, a music video director, lives with her husband Ravi and their two children. However, she is unaware that her husband is actually a robber who carries outsmart crimes with his partner Sabesan. The police officer Dev is pressured to arrest them. After a diamond heist gone wrong, Ravi finally gets caught while Sabesan escapes. Ravi managed to hide the diamonds in his house before being hauled off by the police. During the police custody, Ravi is shot by Dev, injuring him heavily. So Ravi is moved to the hospital, and the doctors eventually save his life. Thereafter, Sabesan goes to his ward and questions Ravi about the diamonds. Sabesan even killed his partner to leave oneself a way out. Sabesan is now urged to find the diamonds and enters Rathi's household as Ravi's friend. What transpires later forms the crux of the story.

== Cast ==
- Prakash Raj as Sabesan
- Khushbu as Rathi
- Nassar as Ravi
- Thalaivasal Vijay as Dev
- Vadivelu as Velan
- Charle as Balan
- Dr. Sharmila as Sharmila
- Mohan V. Ram
- M.Bhanumathi
- Sharmili as Hamsa
- Brahmaguru
- Kanagarajan
- Ramesh
- Sagayaraj
- Master Vasanth Saravana as Tinku
- Baby Aishwarya as Pinky
- Raghuvannan as Suresh
- Muthukaalai as beggar
- Ramji as himself (Special appearance)

== Soundtrack ==
The soundtrack was composed by Sampath Selvan.

Song	Singer(s)	Duration
"Chinna Chinna Kannile"	Unni Menon	5:06
"Chikkiditta Naane"	Anuradha Sriram, Sampath Selvan	4:22
"Gaana Super Gaana"	Sampath Selvan	6:35
"Greetings Cardaa Credit Cardaa"	Anuradha Sriram, Malgudi Subha	4:55
"Vaigai Aaththu Karaiyoram"	Swarnalatha, Sampath Selvan	4:48

== Critical reception ==
Malini Mannath of Chennai Online wrote "The story had the potential for an engaging thriller. If only the director had kept a firm grip on the script and handled the scenes effectively. The narrative leaves many questions unanswered, and the script has so many holes that one could make a sieve out of it. The artistes too could have been better guided. It's a thriller gone haywire". Malathi Rangarajan of The Hindu wrote "If the screenplay had been tightened up a little, Chinna Chinna Kannilae would have probably been more gripping". Saraswathy Srinivas of Sify wrote, "A little more slick editing and care for character delineation would have made Chinna Chinna Kannile a good film. There are straight cuts as in the opening scenes which are jarring".
