= Poovilangu =

- Title card
- Directed by: Ameerjan
- Screenplay by: Ameerjan
- Based on: Prema Parva by B. L. Venu
- Produced by: K. Balachander; Rajam Balachander; Pushpa Kandasamy
- Starring: Murali; Kuyili
- Cinematography: R. Raghunatha Reddy
- Edited by: S. S. Nazir
- Music by: Ilaiyaraaja
- Production company: Kavithalayaa Productions
- Release date: 23 March 1984
- Running time: 145 minutes
- Country: India
- Language: Tamil

Poovilangu (transl. Floral cuff) is a 1984 Indian Tamil-language film directed by Ameerjan, starring Murali and Kuyili, the latter in her acting debut. It was released on 23 March 1984. The film is a remake of the Kannada film Prema Parva (1983). This film made Mohan into Poovilangu Mohan after acting in this film, for his critically acclaimed performance.

== Plot ==
Pandiyan and Saraswati, polar opposites, meet each other by chance at their shared college. Pandiyan is sensitive and carefree, whereas Saraswati is shy and from a strict family. Their relationship starts with accidental meetings that turn into love, shared but not spoken. Pandiyan expresses his love openly, but Saraswati, though drawn to him, is afraid that her strict father might enforce punishment onto her.

As they fall more and more in love, misunderstandings occur. Saraswati often withdraws with fear, and Pandiyan mistakes it for rejection or confusion. As Saraswati's father starts to notice that her behaviour has changed, he becomes even more controlling, causing more emotional stress.

Saraswati becomes increasingly depressed as she handles her feelings, and the inability to voice them, for Pandiyan and the pressure from her home. This lack of communication, her father's emotionally abusive behaviour and Pandiyan's intensive emotions collide, leading to Saraswati's tragic death.

The film ends by showing Pandiyan mourning the love that was once real, but was never meant to be.

== Cast ==
- Murali as Pandiyan
- Kuyili as Saraswathi
- Senthamarai as Raja
- Kallapetti Singaram
- Radha Ravi
- T. S. Babumohan as Senthil
- T. Charle
- Mohanapriya as Priya

== Production ==
Poovilangu marked the directorial debut of Ameerjan who earlier assisted K. Balachander. The film marked the acting debuts of Murali (in Tamil) and Kuyili. Mohan became known as Poovilangu Mohan after acting in this film. The filming began at Kerala Redfort.

== Soundtrack ==
The music was composed by Ilaiyaraaja and lyrics were written by Vairamuthu.

Track listing
No.	Title	Singer(s)	Length
1.	"Aathadi Paavadai"	Ilaiyaraaja	4:58
2.	"Kannil Edho Minnal"	K. J. Yesudas, S. Janaki	4:29
3.	"Love Me Love Me Love Me"	Malaysia Vasudevan	4:33
4.	"Pottaene Poovilangu"	S. Janaki	4:12
Total length:			18:12

== Critical reception ==
Jayamanmadhan of Kalki appreciated the film for various aspects, including way the characters were developed without any confusion, and the screenplay. Sathya. E of Vikatan thanked K. Balachander and Ameerjan for finding and introducing a promising young hero (Murali).
