= Oru Veedu Iru Vaasal =

1990 film by K. Balachander

- Theatrical release poster
- Directed by: K. Balachander
- Screenplay by: K. Balachander
- Story by: Anuradha Ramanan (story 1); Ananthu (story 2)
- Produced by: Rajam Balachander
- Starring: Ganesh; Kumaresh; Surya; Vaishnavi; Livingston
- Cinematography: R. Raghunatha Reddy
- Edited by: Ganesh–Kumar
- Music by: V. S. Narasimhan
- Production company: Kavithalayaa Productions
- Release date: 7 September 1990
- Country: India
- Language: Tamil

Oru Veedu Iru Vaasal (transl. One House, Two Entrances) is a 1990 Indian Tamil-language anthology drama film directed by K. Balachander, starring Ganesh, Kumaresh and Yamini. The film is a compilation of two stories; the first one was adapted from the novel Meendum Meendum by Anuradha Ramanan, and the second story was an original one written by Ananthu. Violin virtuoso-brothers Ganesh and Kumaresh made their acting debuts. The film had no songs. The film won the National Film Award for Best Film on Other Social Issues at the 38th National Film Awards.

== Plot ==
The film contains two distinct story lines, each story line revolving around Ganesh and Kumaresh. This film depicts difficulties women face(d) in a predominantly male dominated society. These women, when pushed to the edge, fight their ostracised husbands and set a tone and lead a meaningful life.

== Cast ==
- Ganesh as Jawahar
- Kumaresh as Sukumar
- Vaishnavi as Yamuna
- Soorya as Shenbagam
- Vivek as Panneer
- Yamini as Vinoda (uncredited)
- Nizhalgal Ravi (Guest appearance)
- Sithara (Guest appearance)
- Disco Shanti (Guest appearance)
- Charle as Elango
- Ranjan as Arun Kapoor
- T. Krishnan as Assistant director
- R. Sundaramoorthy (Guest appearance)
- K. S. Jayalakshmi as Sivappu Rukmani

== Production ==
One of the shooting locations was a bungalow called Kamakoti House in T. Nagar.

== Release and reception ==
Oru Veedu Iru Vaasal was released on 7 September 1990. The Indian Express said, "When you read a novel, if the author has any creative power and capacity to create engrossing characters, and if you have the sensibility to appreciate this, you enter into a whole new world. Seeing Kavithalaya's Oru Veedu Iru Vaasal directed by K. Balachander opened up such vistas for this writer." Ki. Rajendran of Kalki praised the film for eschewing box-office ingredients like action, comedy and songs. The film became a box-office bomb.

== Accolades ==
Event	Category	Awardee	Ref.
38th National Film Awards	Best Film on Other Social Issues	Oru Veedu Iru Vaasal	
Tamil Nadu State Film Awards	Best Editor	Ganesh–Kumar	
