= Pudhiavan =

1984 Indian Tamil film by Ameerjan

- Theatrical release poster
- Directed by: Ameerjan
- Written by: Kanmani Subbu (Dialogues)
- Screenplay by: Ananthu
- Story by: Ananthu
- Produced by: K. Balachander; Rajam Balachander; Pushpa Kandasamy
- Starring: Murali; Anitha; Raveendran; N. Viswanathan
- Cinematography: R. Raghunatha Reddy
- Edited by: S. S. Nazeer
- Music by: V. S. Narasimhan
- Production company: Kavithalayaa Productions
- Release date: 18 August 1984
- Running time: 147 minutes
- Country: India
- Language: Tamil

Pudhiavan (transl. New Man) is a 1984 Indian Tamil-language film directed by Ameerjan and produced by Kavithalayaa Productions. The film stars Murali, Anitha, Raveendran and N. Viswanathan. It was released on 18 August 1984.

== Cast ==
- Murali as Manohar "Mano" and Kishore
- Anitha as Revathy
- Raveendran as Prakash
- N. Viswanathan as M. D. Viswanathan
- Delhi Ganesh as Dhananjayan
- Mohanapriya as Elizabeth
- Vaani as Sundari
- Indira Devi
- Sulochana
- Ramani
- R. Sundaramoorthy
- Veera Raghavan
- Sudhan
- Babu
- Kumaresh
- Suresh
- Mahendravarman
- S. Kumar

Guest appearances

- Rajeev
- Achamillai Gopi
- T. S. Babumohan in Friendly Appearance
- Charle
- Arundathi
- Harihara Krishnan as Bridegroom (in the song "Then Mazhaiyile")
- Agalya
- Gangai Amaran
- Vairamuthu
- N. R. Kittu

== Soundtrack ==
The music was composed by V. S. Narasimhan, with lyrics by Vairamuthu.

Song	Singers	Length
"Naano Kan Parthen"	K. J. Yesudas, Dr. Kalyan	04:26
"Then Mazhaiyile"	S. P. Balasubrahmanyam	03:42
"Kanne Color Colora"	S. P. Balasubrahmanyam, Vani Jairam	04:32
"Yen Kovil"	K. J. Yesudas	04:06
"Vanthathu Vasantha Kalam"	S. P. Balasubrahmanyam	04:06

== Critical reception ==
Jayamanmadhan of Kalki wrote that the story of Pudhiavan is like old rice, but served with curdled onions and grated dates, making it delicious nonetheless. Kumudam praised the acting of cast and noted it seems like director did not have confidence to make a full fledged romantic film otherwise, why would he add all those unnecessary murders and other complications in the latter part? and also felt it was unconvincing of protagonist who was portrayed as angry man running away from cops.
