= Mugila Mallige =

- Directed by: K. Balachander
- Screenplay by: K. Balachander
- Produced by: Chandulal Jain; V. Natarajan
- Starring: Saritha; Pavithra; Srinath; Ashok
- Cinematography: B. S. Loknath; R. Raghunath Reddy
- Edited by: N. R. Kittu
- Music by: V. S. Narasimhan
- Release date: 1985
- Running time: 139 minutes
- Country: India
- Language: Kannada

Mugila Mallige is a 1985 Indian Kannada language film written and directed by K. Balachander and produced by his own Kavithalaya Productions. Starring Saritha, Ashok and Pavitra in lead roles, the film featured Ramakrishna and Srinath in other pivotal roles. Saritha received a Filmfare award for her performance.

The film was a remake of Balachander's own Tamil film Thamarai Nenjam. The film had Suresh Krissna as an assistant director working under Balachander.

== Cast ==
- Srinath
- Saritha
- Ashok
- Ramakrishna
- Pavithra
- Shivaram
- Master Senthil
- Rama Hariharan
- Baby Seetha

== Soundtrack ==
Mugila Mallige

Soundtrack album by V. S. Narasimhan
- Released: 1985
- Genre: Feature film soundtrack
- Label: His Master's Voice

V. S. Narasimhan composed the music for the soundtracks and lyrics written by R. N. Jayagopal. The album consists of four soundtracks.

Track list
No.	Title	Lyrics	Singer(s)	Length
1.	"Prathidina Hosa Kavitheyu"	R. N. Jayagopal	P. Susheela
2.	"Oppide Kannu"	R. N. Jayagopal	P. Susheela, Jayachandran
3.	"Nimageedina Naa Hakuve"	R. N. Jayagopal	Vani Jairam, Jayachandran
4.	"Saaku Saaku Hoge"	R. N. Jayagopal	P. Susheela, Vani Jairam

== Awards ==
- Saritha – Filmfare Award for Best Actress
