= Raja Kaiya Vacha =

- Theatrical release poster
- Directed by: Suresh Krissna
- Written by: Suresh Krissna
- Dialogue by: Ananthu
- Produced by: V. Mohan; V. Natarajan
- Starring: Prabhu; Gautami; Revathi
- Cinematography: P. S. Prakash
- Edited by: Raghu; Baabu
- Music by: Ilaiyaraaja
- Production company: Ananthi Films
- Release date: 7 December 1990
- Running time: 145 minutes
- Country: India
- Language: Tamil

Raja Kaiya Vacha (transl. If Raja lays his hands) is a 1990 Indian Tamil-language comedy film, directed by Suresh Krissna. The film stars Prabhu, Gautami and Revathi with Nassar, Sarathkumar, Nagesh, Janagaraj, Anandaraj, and Poornam Viswanathan in supporting roles. It was released on 7 December 1990. The film's title is derived from a song from Apoorva Sagodharargal (1989).

== Plot ==
Raja is a con artist who falls in love with Vijaya. First, she thinks that he was a police officer and asks him to find lost belongings. However, Raja steals to fulfill her wishes. One day, the police arrests Raja in front of Vijaya. Raja is sent to jail but is welcome like a king in jail. Vijaya leaves the town with her father. When Raja is released, he decides to find Vijaya.

Meanwhile, Johnny, a workers' union leader, often strikes and works with a competitor company manager named Vaidyaraj. Many general managers of the company resigned, so Raja tries to get the job to see Vijaya, who also works there. The company chairman engages Raja, who in turn engages his friend Japan as a company security officer. Divya, the company chairman's granddaughter and a polio patient, falls in love with Raja. The strikes and workers' problem within the company begin to disappear, and Vaidaraj gets furious.

Vijaya begins to understand Raja's heart. Divya's grandfather proposes to Raja to marry her, but Raja says that he is in love with Vijaya. Johnny and Vaidaraj plan to kill Raja, so they put a bomb in the factory. Vaidyaraj reveals that he is the brother of the company chairman. He and Johnny eventually get killed. Finally, Raja saves the factory and marries Vijaya.

== Cast ==
- Prabhu as Raja
- Sarathkumar as Vaidyaraj
- Gautami as Vijaya
- Revathi as Divya (extended cameo appearance)
- Nassar as Johnny
- Anandaraj as Japan
- Nagesh as Vijaya's father
- Janagaraj as Raghu
- Poornam Viswanathan as the company chairman and Divya's grandfather
- Ponnambalam as Goon
- Suresh Krissna
- Charle in a guest appearance
- G. Venkateswaran as himself (guest appearance)
- Laxman Sivaramakrishnan as himself (guest appearance)

== Soundtrack ==
The soundtrack was composed by Ilaiyaraaja. The song "Mazhai Varudhu" is set in Bageshri raga.

Song	Singer(s)	Lyrics	Duration
"Kadhaluku Raja"	Mano, S. Janaki	Piraisoodan	5:05
"Kanneer Thuli"	K. J. Yesudas	Vaali	4:31
"Mazhai Varuthu"	K. S. Chithra, K. J. Yesudas	Pulamaipithan	4:48
"Maruthaani Araicheney"	Ilaiyaraaja, Mano, S. Janaki	Kanmani Subbu	5:11
"Unn Kanakku Thaan"	Mano	Vaali	4:32

== Reception ==
N. Krishnaswamy of The Indian Express wrote, "The film has a classy look, but in the quest for comedy, director Suresh Krishna seems to have taken the story line rather too lightly". C. R. K. of Kalki wrote the earlier parts of the film had youthful factor; following the strike at the car factory, the story began to strike and gradually succumbed to the formula and slipped away.
