= Prema Parva =

- Directed by: S. Siddalingaiah
- Written by: B L Venu
- Produced by: S. Siddalingaiah
- Starring: Murali; Bhavya
- Music by: Rajan–Nagendra
- Release date: 6 August 1983
- Country: India
- Language: Kannada
- Budget: ₹25 lakh
- Box office: ₹1 crore

Prema Parva is a 1983 Indian Kannada-language romantic drama film directed by S. Siddalingaiah starring his son Murali and Bhavya in their lead film debut.

== Cast ==
- Murali as Sadhguru
- Bhavya as Sarasa
- Dinesh
- Vijayakashi
- Sadashiva Brahmavar
- Shashikala
- Master S. D. Suresh

== Production ==
Murali's entry into films was debated at home, but his mother encouraged his father to direct his debut film. While shooting in Malleshwaram, Bengaluru, a bystander yelled "Yeno kariya, neenu act madtiya" (What dark fellow, are you acting?). Although it was Murali's first film that he shot for, Geluvina Hejje (1982) was released first.

== Soundtrack ==
The soundtrack was composed by Rajan–Nagendra.

Prema Parva

Soundtrack album by Rajan–Nagendra
- Released: 1983
- Genre: Feature film soundtrack
- Length: 18:45
- Language: Kannada
- Label: MRT Music

Rajan–Nagendra chronology
Ibbani Karagithu (1983)	Prema Parva (1983)	Olavu Moodidaga (1984)
External audio
- Prema Parva – Jukebox on YouTube

Track listing
No.	Title	Lyrics	Singer(s)	Length
1.	"Anuragada Aaradhane"	Shyamsundar Kulkarni	S. P. Balasubrahmanyam, S. Janaki	4:41
2.	"Ba Mellage"	Doddarangegowda	S. P. Balasubrahmanyam, S. Janaki	4:51
3.	"Yene Sarasavva"	Doddarangegowda	S. P. Balasubrahmanyam, Chorus	4:56
4.	"Aalisiri Sodarare"	Doddarangegowda	S. Janaki	4:17
Total length:				18:45

== Release and remakes ==
The film was a box office failure shattering Siddalingaiah's hopes. Despite this, the film was remade in Tamil as Poovilangu (1984) and in Hindi as Jeena Marna Tere Sang (1992).
