= Natpu =

- Theatrical release poster
- Directed by: Ameerjan
- Written by: Vairamuthu
- Produced by: Hariharan P S V
- Starring: Karthik; Sripriya
- Cinematography: C. S. Ravibabu
- Edited by: S. S. Nazir
- Music by: Ilaiyaraaja
- Production company: Veeralakshmi Combines
- Release date: 11 April 1986
- Country: India
- Language: Tamil

Natpu (transl. Friendship) is a 1986 Indian Tamil-language film directed by Ameerjan and written by Vairamuthu. The film is based on a novel by Vairamuthu that was serialised in Kumudam. It stars Karthik, Sripriya, Radha Ravi and Senthil. The film was released on 11 April 1986, and won two Cinema Express Awards.

== Cast ==
- Karthik
- Sribharathi
- Sripriya
- Radha Ravi
- Senthil
- Gandhimathi
- Charle
- T. S. Raghavendra

== Production ==
The film was an adaptation of a weekly series which Vairamuthu wrote for Kumudam magazine. The film was launched at Prasad Studios. K. Balachander clapped the first shot.

== Soundtrack ==
Soundtrack was composed by Ilaiyaraaja and lyrics were written by Vairamuthu.

Track listing
No.	Title	Singer(s)	Length
1.	"Unnai Kaana"	P. Jayachandran, P. Susheela	4:47
2.	"Singam Rendum"	Malaysia Vasudevan, S. N. Surendar	4:42
3.	"Adi Maadi"	P. Jayachandran, Devie Neithiyar	4:39
4.	"Adhikaalai"	K. J. Yesudas, S. Janaki	4:36
5.	"Aasai Vachen"	P. Susheela	4:40
Total length:			23:24

== Accolades ==
At the 7th Cinema Express Awards, Senthil won the award for Best Comedy Actor, and Radha Ravi received a "special award".
