= Vadugapatti, Theni =

Coordinates: 10°05′03″N 77°34′13″E

Vadugapatti
- panchayat town
- Interactive map of Vadugapatti
- Country: India
- State: Tamil Nadu
- District: Theni

Population (2001)
  - Total: 12,353

Languages
  - Official: Tamil
- Time zone: UTC+5:30 (IST)

Vadugapatti is a village in Periyakulam Taluk, Theni district, Madurai Region in the Indian state of Tamil Nadu.

== Demographics ==
Vadugapatti is 3 km (1.9 mi) from Periyakulam on the Andipatti road. It is located in the hills below Kodaikanal. Several dams and other tourist attractions are close to the village: Vaigai dam, Manjalar dam, Sothuparai dam, Kodaikanal, Suruli Falls, Kumbakkarai Falls, Thekkadi, and Moonaru are all within 10 to 60 km (6.2 to 37.3 mi).

As of the 2001 Indian census, Vadugapatti had a population of 12,354 (51% male, 49% female). Vadugapatti has a literacy rate of 74%, higher than the national average of 59.5%: male literacy is 82%, and female literacy is 65%. Eleven percent of the population is under 6 years of age.

Vadugapatti is known for its garlic market. A central auction is held twice weekly, on Thursdays and Sundays. Most of the garlic is exported in bulk to other cities. The lyricist Vairamuthu is from Vadugapatti.
