= Enakkul Oruvan (1984 film) =

1984 film by S. P. Muthuraman

- Theatrical release poster
- Directed by: S. P. Muthuraman
- Written by: A. L. Narayanan (dialogues)
- Produced by: Rajam Balachander; Pushpa Kandaswamy
- Starring: Kamal Haasan; Sripriya; Shobana; Sathyaraj
- Cinematography: Babu
- Edited by: R. Vittal
- Music by: Ilaiyaraaja
- Production company: Kavithalayaa Productions
- Release date: 23 October 1984
- Running time: 149 minutes
- Country: India
- Language: Tamil

Enakkul Oruvan (transl. A man within me) is a 1984 Indian Tamil-language musical thriller film directed by S. P. Muthuraman, starring Kamal Haasan in the lead role, for whom the film was his 125th as an actor, and Shobana in her Tamil debut, Sathyaraj in supporting roles. It is a remake of the Hindi film Karz (1980), itself based on the American film The Reincarnation of Peter Proud (1975).

== Plot ==
Madan (Kamal Haasan) is a dancer by profession who is a dream boy of all young girls. Kalpana (Shobana), a young woman, is irritated by Madan's fame and she badly criticises his performances which attracts attention of Madan on her. He challenges that he would make her long for him and his love, but he falls in love with her. He tries to win her love in several ways but eventually fails. One night he gets into her house with a face mask which makes Kalpana to misunderstand that he is a thief and screams and alerts her home. Madan is trapped and handed over to the police. Madan, who is a son of pickle businessman Ooruga Ulaganathan (V. K. Ramasamy) rescues him from police custody and finds the reason for incident to be his love for Kalpana. Kalpana's father, who is a psychiatrist, finds that Madan is the son of his old friend Ulaganathan. Madan-Kalpana's marriage is approved and fixed then.

Kalpana who is an aspiring BharathaNatyam dancer performs on her first stage. Madan who watches her performance is disturbed by some illusion of a woman performing Bharathanatyam. He could not resist the disturbance and leaves the place. Kalpana's father considers it as a normal disturbance and asks him to go for a vacation to some place. While choosing for a place, he sees some visuals of Darjeeling and understands that some places are very familiar to him with the fact that he has not visited the place before in his lifetime. He opts to go there and leaves with his friend and fiancée Kalpana. In Darjeeling, he feels everything is familiar to him. At a point he stops in front of a monument, where he gets illusions of some Karate competition and a man participating in it. He feels as if he was that man who participated in the competition and won the trophy. Madan screams "Upendra could not be defeated" several times which alarms his friend and Kalpana. Kalpana narrates the incident to her dad. Kalpana's dad advises her to take care of him and make him sleep when his acts go wrong and unresistible.

One day Madan looks at a passerby woman on the road where he could feel some familiarity with her. The woman resembles the illusion he got early and he feels that she must be Devi (Sripriya). He enquires her if she is Devi but the woman denies that she is not. The lady runs away to escape from Madan but he finds her. The woman is actually Devi only but he could not relate his relationship with her. He could feel a deep love for the lady without knowing the reason. On seeing Upendra's (Kamal Haasan) photo at her house he could remind some incidents. Upendra, a businessman of Nepali origin and son of a Tamil woman (Pandari Bai) meets Devi on his birthday during a dance performance as a part of celebration. Upendra attracted by the beauty and nature of Devi and proposes her. But the marriage is objected by her selfish uncle Rajadurai (Satyaraj) at beginning, but later he agrees, on the condition that Devi must inherit half part of Upendra's will. Upendra marries Devi happily. Upendra is loving and affectionate to his wife. On the next day while Upendra is set out for estate accompanied by Rajadurai but returns dead. Madan explains Devi that Upendra has not died by any accident but actually killed by Rajadurai who pushed him from the Cable car. Devi is shocked by the news. But neither she and nor Madan understand how he knows it. Next time when Madan come to meet Devi, he could see her going to a temple and he follows her. At the temple, he could see Devi with her mother-in-law. Devi tells about Upendra's murder to her. Madan meets the lady and he could develop a feeling of motherly love for her. Upendra's mother considers that her son is back again and feels happy. He hears that Rajadurai threatened the mother and attempted to kill her. He also betrayed Devi by charging for a murder. But Devi did not kill anyone.

Madan promises to get back all the property they have lost. In the struggle, Rajadurai kills Upendra's mother. Madan could not bear the death and he performs all the final rituals as her son. Madan understands all the illusions and feelings are because he is the reincarnation of Upendra. Rajadurai falls from the cable car and dies. With all the legal constraints are settled down, Devi gets back all the lost property of her husband. Devi who understands that Madan is her reincarnated husband, feels for a moment but unites Kalpana with Madan.

== Cast ==
- Kamal Haasan as Madan/Upendra
- Sripriya as Devi
- Shobana as Kalpana
- Sathyaraj as Rajadurai
- V. K. Ramasamy as Ulaganath
- Calcutta Viswanathan as Kalpana's father
- Pandari Bai as Sharada (Upendra's mother)
- Manorama as Madan's mother
- Charle as Madan's friend
- Mrinal Kanti Chakraborty As A Guest

== Production ==
Enakkul Oruvan was a reimagining of the Hindi film Karz (1980), itself based on the American film The Reincarnation of Peter Proud (1975). The song "Enge En Kadhali" was shot at AVM Studios.

== Soundtrack ==
The music was composed by Ilaiyaraaja, with lyrics by Vairamuthu. The song "Ther Kondu" is set in Hamsadhvani raga. The song "Engey Endhan Kadhali" is set in a mix of Abheri and Kharaharapriya, along with Sankarabharanam in the later stanzas. The highlight of the album was the disco song "Megam Kottatum".

Song	Singers	Length
"Enakkul Oruvan"	Malaysia Vasudevan	04:35
"Engey Endhan Kadhali"	S. P. Balasubrahmanyam	07:15
"Megam Kottatum"	Kamal Haasan	05:32
"Megam Kottatum"	S. P. Balasubrahmanyam	05:32
"Mutham Pothaathey"	S. P. Balasubrahmanyam, S. Janaki	04:24
"Ther Kondu Sendravan"	P. Susheela	04:30

== Release and reception ==
The film was released on 22 October 1984 during Diwali day. Kalki's critic said the film left them confused.
