= Siva (1989 Tamil film) =

- Poster
- Directed by: Ameerjan
- Written by: Vedham Pudhithu Kannan (dialogues)
- Screenplay by: Ananthu
- Story by: Rakesh Kumar
- Produced by: Rajam Balachander; Pushpa Kandaswamy
- Starring: Rajinikanth; Raghuvaran; Sowcar Janaki; Shobana
- Cinematography: C. S. Ravibabu
- Edited by: S. S. Nazir
- Music by: Ilaiyaraaja
- Production company: Kavithalayaa Productions
- Release date: 5 May 1989
- Running time: 157 minutes
- Country: India
- Language: Tamil

Siva is a 1989 Indian Tamil-language action film directed by Ameerjan. The film stars Rajinikanth, Raghuvaran, Sowcar Janaki and Shobana. It is a remake of the 1977 Hindi film Khoon Pasina. The film was released on 5 May 1989 and became a box office failure.

== Plot ==
The film begins with Siva and John as kids, and close friends like their fathers. A villain kills their families except for Siva, John, and John's mother, but John does not know that Siva and his mother were alive and vice versa. 20 years later, Siva falls in love with Parvathy and marries her. John is a hired goon who will do only good deeds. John is hired by the same villain to kill Siva and during the fight both get injured and finally they come to know that they are childhood friends. Eventually, both of them unite and fight the bad guy who killed their family.

== Cast ==
- Rajinikanth as Siva (Tiger)
- Raghuvaran as John
- Shobana as Parvathy
- Sowcar Janaki as John's mother
- Radha Ravi
- Vinu Chakravarthy
- Janagaraj
- Charle
- Madhuri
- Disco Shanti
- Delhi Ganesh
- Ganeshkar
- Thyagu
- Ilavarasan
- Poornam Viswanathan
- Vijayakumar in a Guest appearance

== Soundtrack ==
The music composed by Ilaiyaraaja. The song "Iruvizhiyin" is set in Hamsadhvani raga.

Song	Singers	Lyrics	Length
"Ada Maappillai"	S. P. Balasubrahmanyam, Saibaba	Pulamaipithan	06:15
"Adi Kannaathaal"	S. P. Balasubrahmanyam	Pulamaipithan	04:36
"Adi Vaanmathi"	S. P. Balasubrahmanyam, K. S. Chithra	Pulamaipithan	04:29
"Iruvizhiyin"	S. P. Balasubrahmanyam, K. S. Chithra	Pulamaipithan	04:25
"Velli Kizhamai"	Ilaiyaraaja, K. S. Chithra	Vaali	04:32

== Release and reception ==
Siva was released on 5 May 1989 with an A certificate, and became a box-office bomb. P. S. S. of Kalki gave the film a negative review citing how would it be if a film was made in a frenzy to show off Rajini style in a fight? just like Shiva. The film was dubbed in Telugu as Tiger Siva, released on 19 January 1990.
