= Ananthu (screenwriter) =

Indian screenwriter

- Born: Ananthakrishnan Thiruvengadam; Kandramanickam, Thiruvarur, India
- Died: 1998; Chennai, Tamil Nadu, India
- Occupations: Film director, Screenwriter
- Years active: 1970–1997

Ananthakrishnan Thiruvengadam, better known as Ananthu, was an Indian screenwriter working on Tamil language films, often collaborating with K. Balachander. He was the mentor of actor Kamal Haasan.

== Early life ==
Ananthu was born Ananthakrishnan in a village called Kandiramanickam near Karaikudi and Thirupathur. His father, Thiruvengadam, worked at the South Indian Corporation. He studied B. S. C. chemistry. He worked as a demonstrator at colleges and later worked as a clerk at the A. G. S. Office where he met Balachander. He worked as a dialogue writer for Balachander's plays while also participating in story discussions.

== Career ==
Ananthu was a screenwriter and close associate of director K. Balachander. He also worked with director C. Rudraiah on his two films. In the title card, Rudhraiya had dedicated the film Aval Appadithan to Ananthu. Ananthu was sub-dialogue writer with Chitralaya Gopu for the films Anubhavam Pudhumai and Galatta Kalyanam directed by C. V. Rajendran. Ananthu acted in the film Galatta Kalyanam with Sivaji Ganesan and Jayalalitha after intermission.

In 1991, Ananthu directed Sigaram starring S. P. Balasubrahmanyam, Anand Babu, Radha and Ramya Krishnan. A critic noted "with an eye for realism and a talent for profound dialogue, Ananthu makes this a memorable entry into the annals of parallel cinema."

=== Work experience with Kamal Haasan ===
Ananthu was considered by Kamal Haasan as a close associate and mentor. Through Ananthu, Haasan was able to maintain close ties with K. Balachander.

In the early 1970s, Kamal Haasan had become jaded and suicidal with the monotonous, low-key roles that he was receiving from Tamil cinema. He later credited Ananthu for reinvigorating his interest in films, after taking up his suggestion of moving to work on Malayalam films. During the period, Ananthu continued to nurture Kamal Haasan's talent by evaluating his on-screen performances and by introducing him to world cinema. Haasan has also credited Ananthu for teaching him screenwriting.

Ananthu continued to work closely with Haasan for a number of his films in the 1990s through various capacities. He was behind the title of Nammavar, a term also later adapted by Kamal Haasan in his political activities.

Following Ananthu's death in 1998, Kamal Haasan's first Tamil directorial venture Hey Ram (2000) was dedicated to Ananthu. After winning the Henri Langlois award in 2016, Kamal Haasan dedicated the award to Ananthu. An official portrait of Ananthu was inaugurated in 2019 at Kamal Haasan's offices as a part of celebrations marking the actor's 60th year in the film industry.

== Partial filmography ==
As writer and director

Year	Work	Credited for	Notes	Ref.
Year	Work	Writer	Notes	Ref.
1978	Aval Appadithan	Yes		
1980	Gramathu Athiyayam	Yes		
1981	Meendum Kokila	Screenplay		
1981	Raja Paarvai	Screenplay		
1984	Pudhiavan	Yes		
1987	Kadamai Kanniyam Kattupaadu	Screenplay		
1988	Sathyaa	Screenplay		
1988	En Thamizh En Makkal	Story		
1989	Siva	Screenplay		
1990	Unnai Solli Kutramillai	Screenplay		
1990	Keladi Kannmanii	Story		
1990	Raja Kaiya Vacha	Dialogues		
1990	Oru Veedu Iru Vaasal	Yes		
1991	Sigaram	Yes	Also director	
1995	Sathi Leelavathi	Story		
1996	Kalloori Vaasal	Dialogues		
1996	Kadhal Pagadai	Story	TV series	
1997	Aahaa	Screenplay		

As actor

Year	Title	Ref.
1968	Galatta Kalyanam	
1970	Kalyaana Oorvalam	
1989	Apoorva Sagodharargal	
1990	Michael Madana Kama Rajan	
1990	Anjali	
1991	Gunaa	
