= Ganesh and Kumaresh =

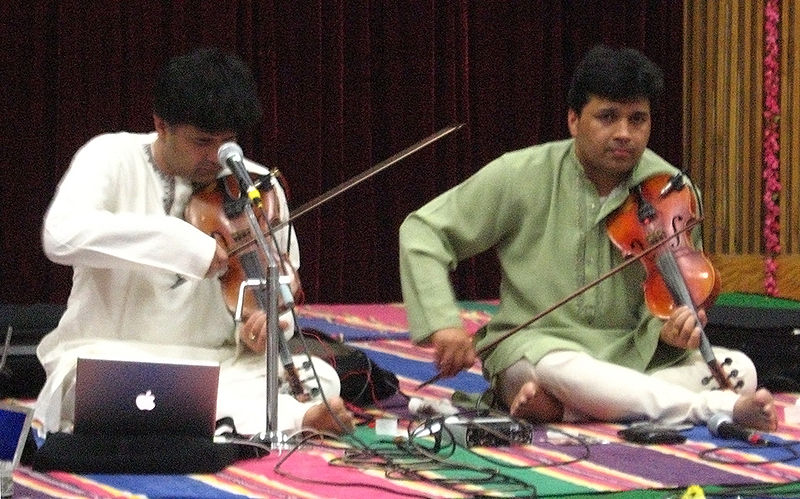
- Ganesh and Kumaresh at IIM Bangalore

Background information
- Also known as: Violin Brothers / Fiddling Monks
- Genre: Carnatic music
- Years active: 1972 - Present
- Website: www.ganeshkumaresh.org

Ganesh and Kumaresh are an Indian duo of violinists known for their contributions to the Carnatic music tradition of South India. The brothers are recognised as modern contemporary artists in "Sastriya Sangitam". They were honoured with the Sangeet Natak Akademi Award in 2018 for Carnatic Instrumental Music (Violin). Kumaresh's wife, Jayanthi Kumaresh, is a renowned Veena player.

== Early life ==
Ganesh and Kumaresh were born in Kanpur, Uttar Pradesh, in 1964 and 1967, respectively. Their father, Sri T.S. Rajagopalan, was employed with the Life Insurance Corporation of India. Their musical training began at home at the early ages of 3 and 2, respectively, under the guidance of their father, who also taught other students in the neighbourhood.

== Music career ==
Ganesh and Kumaresh not only perform but also compose music for films and dance productions. They have contributed music to movies such as Dance Like a Man and Chandrikai. Their musical style, Raga Pravaham, explores the intricacies of Indian ragas and talas.

They have performed at numerous global festivals in countries and regions including India, the USA, Canada, Germany, France, Belgium, Switzerland, the Middle East, Southeast Asia, the Maldives, and Australia.

They also appeared in a Doordarshan Bharati musical advertisement for national unity, alongside veterans from music, sports, and other fields, representing their respective disciplines.

Ganesh Rajagopalan is currently an active member of Shakti, which won the Best Global Music Album award at the 2024 Grammys for their comeback album This Moment.

== Discography ==
- Colours of India
- Navarasa
- Shadjam
- Aksharam
- Carnatic Chills
- Expressions
- Samarpan
- Brahmma
- Seasons
- Aditya
- Vasantham
- Bowing with Passion

== Music singles ==
- Milky way
- Flights of Anjaneya
- Modi
- Begada
- Nalinakanti

== Awards ==
- Grammy Award 2023 for the Album Shakti - This Moment
- Sangeet Natak Akademi Award 2018
- Academy of Music Chowdiah Award 2016
- Asthana Vidwans of the Sri Matam of Kanchi Kamakoti Peetam and Sringeri Sharada Peetham
- Dwaram Venkata Swami Naidu Award
- Titles: Kalaimamani, Sunaada Sironmani, Sangeetha Saragnya, Sarasa Gaana Praveena, and others
