= V. S. Narasimhan =

Indian violinist and composer

- Born: 1943 (age 82–83); Mysore, Kingdom of Mysore, British India (now Mysuru, Karnataka, India)
- Occupations: Violinist, composer
- Father: Gottuvadyam Seenivasa Iyengar

V. S. Narasimhan (born 1943) is an Indian violinist and composer who worked in South Indian films. He is also the founder of the Madras String Quartet.

== Life ==
V. S. Narasimhan was born in Mysore. He is the son of the violinist Gottuvadyam Srinivasa Iyengar. He studied Carnatic music from age four under his father. Narasimhan also learnt Western classical music and entered Tamil cinema as a violinist, playing for all leading composers except G. Ramanathan. He even briefly tutored under Master Dhanraj. Narasimhan debuted as a composer with Achamillai Achamillai (1984), and also contributed to Ilaiyaraaja's studio album How to Name It?. In 1993, he founded the Madras String Quartet. In 2010, Narasimhan was awarded the Gotuvadyam Narayana Iyengar Award for Excellence. In 2024 he released a book Carnatic and Western Music- Blending the two Classical Music Systems.

== Filmography ==
Year	Title	Language	Ref.
1984	Achamillai Achamillai	Tamil	
1984	Pudhiavan	Tamil	
1984	Eeran Sandhya	Malayalam	
1985	Yaar?	Tamil	
1985	Kalyana Agathigal	Tamil	
1985	Mugila Mallige	Kannada	
1986	Kadaikan Parvai	Tamil	
1986	Aayiram Pookkal Malarattum	Tamil	
1987	Vanna Kanavugal	Tamil	
1988	Kan Simittum Neram	Tamil	
1990	Oru Veedu Iru Vaasal	Tamil	
1994	Paasamalargal	Tamil	
