= Pudhu Pudhu Arthangal =

1989 film by K. Balachander

- Poster
- Directed by: K. Balachander
- Written by: K. Balachander
- Produced by: Rajam Balachander; Pushpa Kandaswamy
- Starring: Raghu; Geetha
- Cinematography: R. Raghunatha Reddy
- Edited by: Ganesh Kumar
- Music by: Ilaiyaraaja
- Production company: Kavithalayaa Productions
- Release date: 28 October 1989
- Running time: 150 minutes
- Country: India
- Language: Tamil

Pudhu Pudhu Arthangal (transl. New Meanings) is a 1989 Indian Tamil-language romantic drama film, written and directed by K. Balachander. The film stars Rahman (credited as Raghu) and Geetha, with Sowcar Janaki, Jayachitra, Janagaraj and Sithara (in her Tamil cinema debut) in supporting roles. It was released on 28 October 1989. The film won a Filmfare Award South, and two Tamil Nadu State Film Awards.

== Plot ==
Manibharati is a successful playback singer who lives with his possessive wife Gowri. Tricked into marriage by his conniving mother-in-law, what really irks Bharati is his wife's inability to deal with his rabid female fans, having been one herself. Tensions escalate until Bharati leaves home after a fight. He meets Jyoti on the way, who’s also escaping her abusive husband that forced her into club dancing and prostitution. Bharati and Jyoti end up travelling to Goa together, where they find themselves with no money and decide to make themselves a living working as servers at a restaurant.

Bharati gets a call from his PA back home that Gowri is ill. Unbeknownst to him, his PA was forced to call Bharati and lie to bring him home; when he visits with Jyoti, Gowri calls her profanities and doesn’t let her in. Bharati gets so angry at this treatment of his friend that he leaves, claiming that he loves Jyoti. Gowri files for a divorce and informs news reporters about Jyoti, and starts dating Guru, a popular cricket player that had been in love with Gowri in the past. Guru accepts Gowri’s proposal and abandons his girlfriend Yamuna, who commits suicide at their wedding hall. Gowri’s mother and her PA feel that she is mentally unstable now from the trauma she’s suffered, and they beg Bharati to go and see her in the hospital. Bharati takes Jyoti with him to visit Gowri, and Jyoti sees that Bharati and Gowri belong with each other. As she leaves the hospital, she sees her husband tracked her down to apologise, and goes home with him. Bharati is shows to go to his next music recording, finally happy, and looking after his wife in the hospital.

== Cast ==
- Raghu as Manibharathi
- Geetha as Gowri
- Sowcar Janaki as Baby Fernandez
- Jayachitra as Kanchanamala
- Janagaraj as Jolly
- Sithara as Jyothi
- K. S. Jayalakshmi as Krishnaveni
- Lalitha Kumari as Jolly's wife
- Chi. Guru Dutt as Guru
- Shabana as Yamuna
- Poornam Viswanathan as Ruby Fernandez
- Charle as Diwakar, Reporter
- Vivek as Vittal

Cameo appearances

- Ilaiyaraaja as himself in the song "Kalayanamalai"
- Kuyili
- Visu
- Vaali
- Vinu Chakravarthy
- Disco Shanthi
- G. Venkateswaran
- Delhi Ganesh
- Keyaar

== Production ==
Malayalam actress Sithara was introduced in Tamil through this film. It also marked the acting debut of Chi. Guru Dutt. Balachander chose Kala as the lead dance choreographer after being impressed with her work in his previous directorial venture Punnagai Mannan (1986). The dubbing voice for Rahman was provided by Nizhalgal Ravi.

== Themes and influences ==
According to T. A. Narasimhan of Hindu Tamil Thisai, the film is said to be based on the stage play Kaaranam Kettu Vaadi by Chithralaya Gopu.

== Soundtrack ==
The music was composed by Ilaiyaraaja and the lyrics were written by Vaali. This was the final collaboration between Ilaiyaraaja and Balachander. According to journalist Kamini Mathai, Ilaiyaraaja could not commit to composing the background score as there was a strike; Balachander decided to use scores from his older films to fill the unfinished portions, angering Ilaiyaraaja and leading to the end of his alliance with Balachander. The song "Kalyana Maalai" is set in the Carnatic raga known as Sindhu Bhairavi, "Eduthu Naan Vidava" is set in Bageshri, and "Guruvayurappa" is set in Abheri. "Keladi Kanmani" was later adapted in Hindi as "Chandni Raat Hai", composed by Anand–Milind for Baaghi (1990). The song "Kalyaana Maalai" was used as a promotional song for Dinasari (2025), which also featured music by Ilaiyaraaja.

Track listing
No.	Title	Singer(s)	Length
1.	"Eduthu Naan Vidava"	S. P. Balasubrahmanyam, Ilaiyaraaja	4:45
2.	"Ellorum Mavatta"	S. P. Balasubrahmanyam, S. P. Sailaja	4:34
3.	"Guruvayurappa"	S. P. Balasubrahmanyam, K. S. Chithra	2:12
4.	"Kalyaana Maalai"	S. P. Balasubrahmanyam	5:57
5.	"Kalyaana Maalai" (version 2)	S. P. Balasubrahmanyam	4:40
6.	"Keladi Kanmani"	S. P. Balasubrahmanyam	4:35
Total length:			26:43

== Release and reception ==
Pudhu Pudhu Arthangal was released on 28 October 1989, Diwali day. P. S. S. of Kalki opined that Balachander, despite having done so many films, did not have the courage to give a different result.

== Accolades ==
Event	Category	Recipient	Ref.
Filmfare Awards South	Best Director – Tamil	K. Balachander	
Tamil Nadu State Film Awards	Second Best Film	Pudhu Pudhu Arthangal	
Tamil Nadu State Film Awards	Best Director	K. Balachander	

== Impact ==
Rahman considered Pudhu Pudhu Arthangal to be "the biggest milestone in [his] career" in Tamil, saying, "It helped me set my two legs permanently in [Tamil cinema]". The song "Keladi Kanmani" inspired the title of a 1990 film. A Hindi remake of Pudhu Pudhu Arthangal entered production with Rahul Roy starring, but the film never had a theatrical release.

== Bibliography ==
- Mathai, Kamini (2009). A.R. Rahman: The Musical Storm. India: Penguin Books. ISBN 978-0-670-08371-8.
- Narwekar, Sanjit (1994). Directory of Indian film-makers and films. Flicks Books. ISBN 978-0-948911-40-8.
- Sundararaman (2007) [2005]. Raga Chintamani: A Guide to Carnatic Ragas Through Tamil Film Music (2nd ed.). Pichhamal Chintamani. OCLC 295034757.
