= Charle =

Indian actor (born 1960)

Dr.Charle
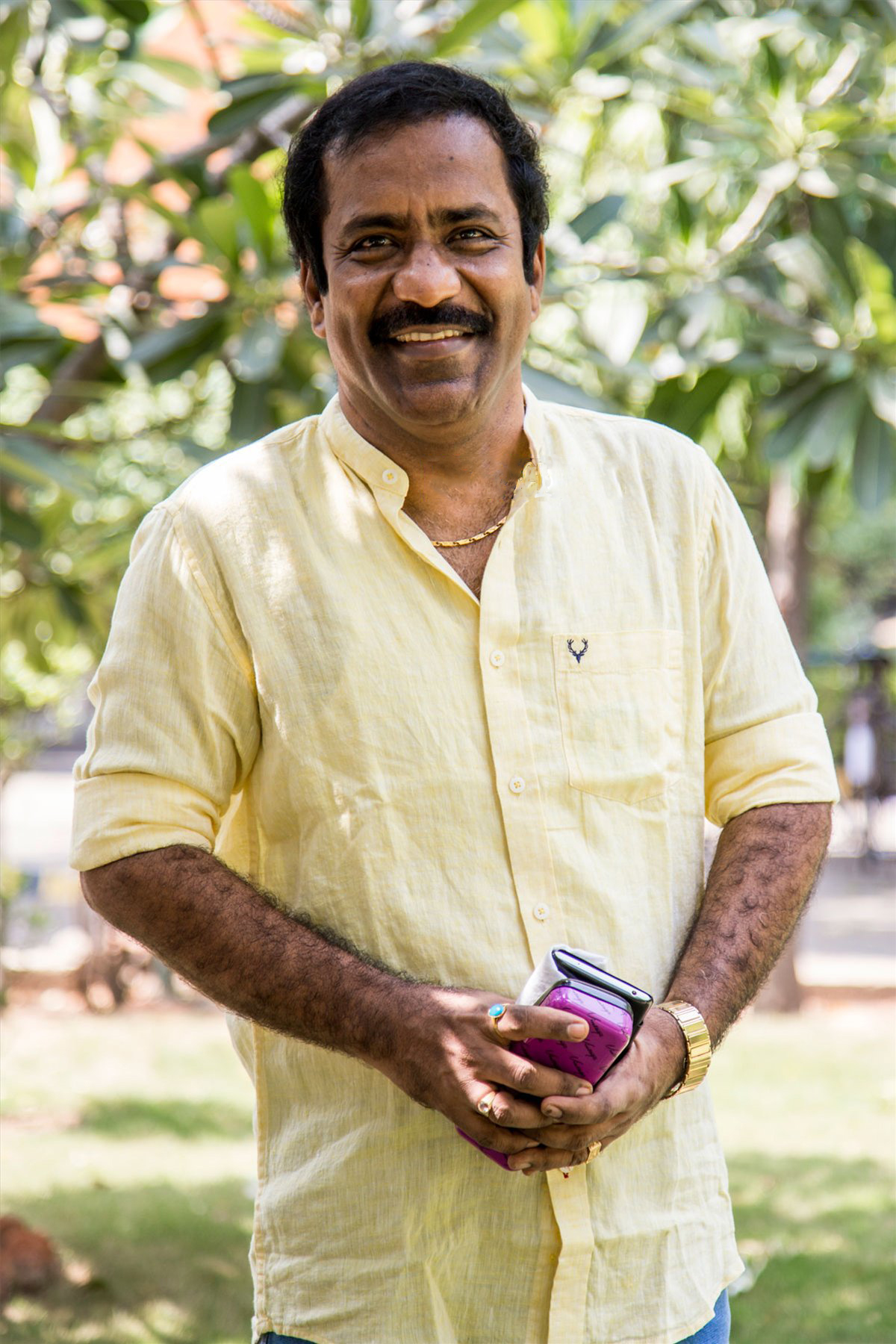
- Charlie at Maanagaram Press Meet
- Born: Velmurugan Thangasamy Manohar; 6 March 1960 (age 66); Kovilpatti, Tamil Nadu, India
- Other name: V. T. M. Charle
- Citizenship: Indian
- Education: Alagappa University., Madurai Kamaraj University, G.V.N. College, Tamil University
- Occupations: Film actor; comedian
- Years active: 1982–present
- Spouse: Annie Charle
- Children: 2

Velmurugan Thangasamy Manohar (born 6 March 1960), professionally credited as Charle (/tʃɑːrli/), is an Indian actor who works in Tamil cinema. He has acted in more than 800 Tamil films as a comedian and supporting actor. Charle was named after the English actor Charlie Chaplin.

== Biography ==
Charle completed his degree in chemistry from G. V. N. College in Kovilpatti, Tamil Nadu. During his college days, he was known for histrionics and his uncanny ability to imitate Tamil actors like Sivaji Ganesan, Muthuraman and Nagesh. He is an entertainer, and a stage artist, and started his career as a Staff Artist – Actor in Song & Drama Division of Ministry of Information and Broadcasting and moved on to perform more than 1000 dramas in six years. He was named Charle and got introduced in the film Poikkal Kudhirai in the year 1982 by the director K. Balachander. He proved to be an actor in comedy as well as character roles. He has more than 800 films to his credit and has played a vital role in many films, including films produced by National Film Development Corporation of India. He is highly talented in miming, mono acting and anchoring in stage shows and has performed in various countries.

Charle holds a Master of Arts degree from Madurai Kamaraj University and Master of Philosophy degree from Karaikkudi Alagappa University. He submitted his dissertation for M.Phil. in the title, "Contributions of Comedians in the growth of Tamil cinema – 1937 to 1967".

Charle received his Ph.D. in Tamil in the topic "Humour in Tamil Cinema" from Tamil University, Thanjavur in October 2019. His guide was Professor K Ravindran, former Head of the Drama department, Tamil University.

== Awards ==
- Tamil Nadu State Government Award
- Film Fans Association, Chennai
  - Best Comedian Award – 1994– 2 times
  - Best Character Artiste Award – 1996
- Bharath Social & Cultural Academy, Chennai
  - Best Comedian Award – 1998, 1999, 2000 & 2001– 4 times
- Kalaimamani Award 2004
- Kalaichchigaram Award 2018

== Partial filmography ==
=== Tamil films ===
Year	Title	Role	Notes and Ref.
1982	Lottery Ticket		
1983	Anney Anney	Faffu	
1983	Poikkal Kudhirai	Paramasivam	
1984	Achamillai Achamillai	Patchi (Petchiappan)	
1984	Enakkul Oruvan	Madan's friend	
1984	Poovilangu		
1984	Pudhiavan		Guest appearance
1985	Bandham	Abdul	
1985	Kalyana Agathigal		
1985	Ilam Kandru		
1985	Janani		
1985	Naam Iruvar	Samipillai	
1985	Thiramai		
1986	Odangal		
1986	Pudhiya Poovidhu		
1986	Vidinja Kalyanam		
1986	Yaaro Ezhuthiya Kavithai	Doctor	
1986	Uyire Unakkaga	Murugesan Mudeliyar's assistant	
1986	Thazhuvatha Kaigal		
1986	Sigappu Malargal		
1986	Punnagai Mannan		
1986	Natpu		
1986	Mella Thirandhathu Kadhavu	Subramani's friend	
1986	Dharma Pathini	MLA Palayam	
1986	Cinema Cinema		
1986	Aayiram Pookkal Malarattum		
1986	Kodai Mazhai		
1987	Aankalai Nambathey		
1987	Arul Tharum Ayyappan		
1987	Ivaloru Pournami		
1987	Thulasi	Khan	
1987	Thangachi	KD	
1987	Ondru Engal Jathiye		
1987	Vanna Kanavugal		
1987	Solvathellam Unmai	Caregiver Psychiatrist	
1987	Megam Karuththirukku		
1987	Manathil Uruthi Vendum	Patient	Guest appearance
1987	Poovizhi Vasalile		Guest appearance
1987	Michael Raj		
1987	Jallikattu	Arjun's friend	
1987	Ananda Aradhanai		
1988	Solla Thudikuthu Manasu	Ramankutty	
1988	Ullathil Nalla Ullam	Gnanavel	
1988	Kai Naattu		
1988	Thambi Thanga Kambi	Madhu	
1988	Naan Sonnathey Sattam	Sappani	
1988	Nallavan	Raja's friend	
1988	Senthoora Poove	Pacchi	
1988	Unnal Mudiyum Thambi		
1988	Dharmathin Thalaivan	Mani	
1988	Thai Paasam		
1988	Manamagale Vaa		
1988	Uzhaithu Vaazha Vendum	Chellappa	
1988	Puthiya Vaanam		
1989	Valadhu Kalai Vaithu Vaa		
1989	Thangamani Rangamani	Kannayeeram	
1989	Yogam Raja Yogam		
1989	Samsara Sangeetham		
1989	Dharma Devan		
1989	En Thangai		
1989	Idhaya Dheepam		
1989	Annanukku Jai		
1989	Pudhu Pudhu Arthangal	Diwakar	
1989	Sonthakkaran	Resident of Bharath Nagar	
1989	Varusham 16	Narayana	
1989	Ore Oru Gramathiley		
1989	Thangamani Rangamani		
1989	Nyaya Tharasu	Bose	
1989	Manidhan Marivittan		
1989	Siva		
1989	Uthama Purushan	Sethu	
1990	Raja Kaiya Vacha		Guest appearance
1990	Pudhu Vasantham	Manohar	
1990	En Uyir Thozhan	Pangu	
1990	Idhaya Thamarai	Drunkard	
1990	Sirayil Pootha Chinna Malar		
1990	Pattanathil Petti		
1990	Sakthi Parasakthi		
1990	Keladi Kannmanii	Sasi's friend	
1990	Oru Veedu Iru Vasal	Elango	
1990	Unnai Solli Kutramillai	Durai	
1990	Ulagam Pirandhadhu Enakkaga		
1990	Jagathalaprathapan	Sri	
1990	Pudhu Pudhu Ragangal		
1990	Vaigasi Poranthachu	Teacher	
1990	Mounam Sammadham	Mani	
1990	Manaivi Oru Manickam		
1990	Pengal Veettin Kangal		
1990	Anjali	Police officer	
1990	Amma Pillai		
1990	60 Naal 60 Nimidam		
1990	Pudhu Padagan		
1990	Inaindha Kaigal	Singer	Guest appearance
1991	Vasanthakala Paravai	Ravi's friend	
1991	Gnana Paravai	Kanni	
1991	Chithirai Pookkal		
1991	Pondatti Sonna Kettukanum		
1991	Ponnukku Sethi Vanthachu		
1991	MGR Nagaril	Anand	
1991	Sir... I Love You		
1991	Gopura Vasalile	Manohar's friend	
1991	Thalapathi	Mani	
1991	Azhagan	Television Anchor	
1991	Sigaram	Madhavan	
1992	Devar Veettu Ponnu		
1992	Nadodi Pattukkaran	Seedan	
1992	Brahmachari	Panchavarnam	
1992	Mudhal Kural		
1992	Vaaname Ellai	Sabu	
1992	Kaviya Thalaivan		Guest appearance
1992	Chinna Pasanga Naanga	Manikkam	
1992	Endrum Anbudan	Munsamy	
1992	Onna Irukka Kathukanum	Issaki	
1992	Kasu Thangakasu		
1992	Oor Panchayathu		
1992	Uyiril Oru Raagam		
1992	Singaravelan	Flute Ramasamy	
1992	Kaaval Geetham	David	
1993	Uzhaippali	Tamilarasan's friend	
1993	Uthama Raasa	Chinnaiya's servant	
1993	Thangakkili		
1993	Mutrugai	Mani	
1993	Maamiyar Veedu		
1993	Pudhupiravi		
1993	Pudhiya Thendral		
1993	Purusha Lakshanam	Rajesh	
1993	Parvathi Ennai Paradi	Pattinathar	
1993	Kilipetchu Ketkavaa	Villager	
1993	Karpagam Vanthachu	Madhavan	
1993	Karuppu Vellai		
1993	Jaathi Malli	Udhagai Murugan	
1993	En Idhaya Rani		
1993	Vedan		
1993	Dasarathan		
1993	Chinna Kannamma	Pichandi	
1993	Amaravathi	Seethapathy	
1993	Airport		
1994	Ulavaali		
1994	Veera		
1994	Veeramani	Singaravelan	
1994	Vaa Magale Vaa	Raman	
1994	Seevalaperi Pandi		
1994	Pudhusa Pootha Rosa		
1994	Priyanka		
1994	Thendral Varum Theru		
1994	Duet	Vellaiyan	
1994	Senthamizh Selvan		
1994	Subramaniya Swamy	Kunju Khader	
1994	Sakthivel		
1995	Aakaya Pookkal		
1995	Anbu Magan		
1995	Oru Oorla Oru Rajakumari	Madasamy	
1995	Valli Vara Pora	Thangapandi	
1995	Varraar Sandiyar		
1995	Gandhi Pirantha Mann	Taxi driver	
1995	Rani Maharani		
1995	Aanazhagan	Sudhakar	
1996	Poove Unakkaga	Gopi	
1996	Thuraimugam	Jana	
1996	Karuppu Roja		
1996	Pudhu Nilavu		
1996	Nattupura Pattu		
1996	Kizhakku Mugam	Mukka	
1996	Karuvelam Pookkal	Mariappan	
1996	Gopala Gopala	Chettiar	
1996	Summa Irunga Machan	Sigamani	
1996	Andha Naal	Vincent Babu's friend	
1996	Namma Ooru Raasa		
1997	Kaalamellam Kaathiruppen	Kannan's friend	
1997	Kaalamellam Kadhal Vaazhga	Perumal	
1997	Pongalo Pongal	Arumugam	
1997	Pathini		
1997	Pagaivan		
1997	Kathirunda Kadhal	Pavadai	
1997	Raman Abdullah		
1997	Ettupatti Rasa	Mokkaiyan	
1997	Once More	Kesavan Nair	
1997	Adimai Changili		
1997	Adhibathi		
1997	Kadhalukku Mariyadhai	Kesavan	
1998	Ponmanam		
1998	Velai		
1998	Ninaithen Vandhai	Gokul's brother-in-law	
1998	Unnudan	Azhagu Sundaram	
1998	Nilaave Vaa	Kilipas	
1998	Thaayin Manikodi		Uncredited role
1998	Ellame En Pondattithaan	Peter	
1998	Pudhumai Pithan		
1998	Pooveli	Chidambaram's brother's brother-in-law	
1998	Thanga Magal		
1998	Kaadhal Kavithai	Anandham	
1999	Amarkkalam	Joe Thomas	
1999	Time	Chittappa	
1999	Aasaiyil Oru Kaditham	Servant	
1999	Hello	Chandru's friend	
1999	Sangamam	Shanmugam	
1999	Endrendrum Kadhal	Sabapathi	
1999	Suryodayam	Nambi	
1999	Kannupada Poguthaiya	Chinna	
1999	Kanave Kalayadhe	Paneer	
1999	Sundari Neeyum Sundaran Naanum		
2000	Kannukkul Nilavu	Surya	
2000	Unnai Kodu Ennai Tharuven	Surya's friend	
2000	Vetri Kodi Kattu	Pazhani	
2000	Parthen Rasithen	Sophraj	
2000	Karuvelam Pookkal	Mariappan	
2000	Thenali	Kanthaswamy	
2000	Anbudan	Sathya's friend	
2000	Ennavalle	Ganeshan	
2000	Kadhal Rojavae	Nixon	
2001	Friends	Gopal	
2001	Piriyadha Varam Vendum	Sanjay's friend	
2001	Pandavar Bhoomi		
2001	Alli Arjuna	Oomadurai	
2001	Veettoda Mappillai	Ganga	
2001	Chocklet	Sasi	
2001	Kasi	Sodala	
2002	Saptham	Kothandam	
2002	Thamizh	Ammavasai	
2002	Thenkasi Pattanam	S. K. Velu	
2002	Nanba Nanba	Joseph	
2002	Ezhumalai	Ezhumalai's assistant	
2002	Unnai Ninaithu	Mei Meiyappan	
2002	Red	Kaipulla	
2002	Gemini	Chinna Salem	
2002	Junior Senior		
2002	Pammal K. Sambandam	Sambandam's lawyer	
2002	Naina	Pazhani	
2002	En Mana Vaanil	Paramasivam	
2003	Kadhaludan		
2003	Sena	Pandian	
2003	Banda Paramasivam	Nokia	
2003	Alaudin	Chinnasamy's assistant	
2003	Jay Jay	MLA Sattamuthu	
2003	Punnagai Poove	Sudhakar	
2004	Kovil	Boothapandi	
2004	Jananam	Ganesh	
2004	Ramakrishna	Pavalakodi's brother	
2005	Ayya	Muthuvel	
2005	Girivalam	Pavadai	
2005	Anniyan	Wastrel	
2005	Mazhai	Director	
2005	Oru Kalluriyin Kathai	Lecturer Azhagusundaram	
2006	Nenjirukkum Varai	Singamuthu	
2006	Thiruttu Payale	Watchman	
2007	Vel	Moorthy	
2007	Thirumagan	Ondipuli	
2008	Sadhu Miranda		
2008	Velli Thirai	Assistant Director Santhanam	
2009	Ananda Thandavam		
2009	Enga Raasi Nalla Raasi	Bala	
2009	Mathiya Chennai		
2011	Avargalum Ivargalum	Catering contractor	
2011	Venghai	Murugesan	
2011	Vazhividu Kanney Vazhividu		
2012	Vilayada Vaa	Doctor	
2012	Ishtam	Watchman	
2013	Neram	Mayilsamy	Bilingual film
2013	Desingu Raja		
2014	Angusam		
2014	Damaal Dumeel	Selvam	
2014	Jeeva	Arul Pragasam	
2015	Papanasam	Kannan	
2015	Idhu Enna Maayam	father of Arun's friend	
2015	Thakka Thakka	Indhu's father	
2015	Kirumi	Prabhakar	
2015	Urumeen	Siva Lingam	
2016	Aarathu Sinam	Arokiya Raj	
2016	24	Reddiyar	
2016	Oru Naal Koothu	Benjamin	
2016	Enakku Innoru Per Irukku	Subbiah	
2017	Yaman	Thiagarajan	
2017	Maanagaram	Nataraj	
2017	Paambhu Sattai	Kannan	
2017	Kadhal Kasakuthaiya	Diya's father	
2017	Oru Kanavu Pola		
2017	Velaikkaran	Murugesan	
2018	Kannakkol		
2018	Pattinapakkam	Bhai	
2019	Vellai Pookal	Bharatidasan	
2019	Bodhai Yeri Budhi Maari	Constable	
2019	Gurkha	Usain Bolt	
2019	Mei	Narmadha's father	
2019	Dhanusu Raasi Neyargale	Ramasamy	
2020	Pizhai	Sockalingam	
2020	Walter	Paneerselvam	
2021	Theerpugal Virkapadum	Dr. Parthiban	
2022	Drama	Moorthy	
2022	Aattral	Arjun's father	
2022	Udanpaal	Vinayagam	
2023	Kondraal Paavam	Karuppusamy	
2023	D3	Mani	
2023	Erumbu	Annadurai	
2023	Iraivan	Dr. Yoganand	
2023	Joe	College Security Guard	
2024	Arimapatti Sakthivel	Kuzhandhaivel	
2024	Finder Project 1	Peter	
2024	Rooban		
2024	Lineman	Subbayya	
2025	Aghathiyaa	Aghathiyan's father	
2025	Yaman Kattalai		
2025	Bun Butter Jam	Kumar Senthamizhan	
2025	Coolie	Ravi	
2025	Mask	Sargunam "Guna"	
2026	Lockdown		

=== Other language films ===
Year	Title	Role	Language	Notes and Ref.
1989	Indrudu Chandrudu	Mental Patient	Telugu	
1995	Hijack	Sulochanan a.k.a. Sulu	Malayalam	
1996	Aur Ek Prem Kahani	Bus conductor	Hindi	
2010	Sandadi	Pavan's friend	Telugu	
2010	Cheriya Kallanum Valiya Policeum	Kurukkuvatti Duraichamy	Malayalam	
2013	Neram	Mayilsamy	Malayalam	Bilingual film
2022	Bro Daddy	Venkayya	Malayalam	
2023	Philip's	Senthil	Malayalam	

Television

- Balachanderin Chinnathirai
- Chutney Sambar (2024)

=== Dubbing artist ===
- Shanmuga Pandian (1999) - MS Narayana
- Chutti Chathan (2010) - Ravi Vaswani and Jagadeesh
