= Unnai Solli Kutramillai =

- Poster
- Directed by: Ameerjan
- Written by: Crazy Mohan (dialogue)
- Screenplay by: Ananthu
- Story by: Ameerjan
- Produced by: Rajam Balachander; Pushpa Kandaswamy
- Starring: Karthik; Sithara
- Cinematography: C. S. Ravibabu
- Edited by: S. S. Nazir
- Music by: Ilaiyaraaja
- Production company: Kavithalayaa Productions
- Release date: 17 March 1990
- Running time: 145 minutes
- Country: India
- Language: Tamil

Unnai Solli Kutramillai (transl. You are blameless) is a 1990 Indian Tamil-language film directed by Ameerjan, starring Karthik and Sithara. The film, produced by Kavithalayaa Productions, was released on 17 March 1990.

== Plot ==
Balu is a graduate youth who came from his village to town, and wants to become rich. He works as a police informer and falls in love with Janaki, the daughter of Inspector Veerapandian. Veerapandian asks Balu to watch his daughter closely, to see if she had a boyfriend. At the same time, Veerapandian's enemy Kumar tries to kidnap her daughter, but fail due to his opposition. Balu finds an illegal drug trade and his house's owner was sent to jail, then his whole family commits suicide. Veerapandian is promoted as assistant commissioner and Balu resigns from his job. One day, Veerapandian finds Balu in a crime scene and asks him to identify the killer, but he refuses. Even after being tortured, he says nothing. After being released from prison, he cannot find a job. Baby is killed and Balu decides to steal the money from the criminals. Balu becomes rich and Kumar falls in love with Balu's sister Parvathi. Balu was later arrested by Veerapandian and brutally tortured by the police in prison. Kumar refuses Balu's sisters request to save Balu, his sister realises that she has been cheated by Kumar and Kumar kills her. Janaki tells that the culprit is Darmaraj and Veerapandian releases him. Balu kills Kumar and Darmaraj to revenge his sister death.

== Cast ==
- Karthik as Balu alias Informer
- Radha Ravi as K. Veerapandian
- Sithara as Janaki
- Kuyili as Baby
- Nassar as Kumar
- Charle as Durai
- Shihan Hussaini as Dharmaraj
- Typist Gopu as a police constable
- Kavithalayaa Krishnan as police constable #501
- G. M. Sundar
- LIC Narasimhan
- Vadivukkarasi as Balu's mother

== Soundtrack ==
The soundtrack was composed by Ilaiyaraaja, with lyrics written by Vaali.

| Song | Singer(s) | Duration |
|---|---|---|
| "Kettu Pattanam" | Ilaiyaraja | 4:31 |
| "Raaththiriyil Thookkamillai" | Usha Uthup | 5:02 |
| "Kar Silai Silai Thaan" | Usha Uthup, Saibaba | 4:51 |
| "Sorkathin Vasapadi" | K. J. Yesudas, K. S. Chitra | 5:01 |

== Critical reception ==
C. R. K. of Kalki wrote the basic story has evolved into a thin line that tries to connect the strong events that are set separately calling it the film's both positive and negative while praising the acting of Karthik and Radharavi, cinematography and music and concluded calling it entertainment where questions of why and how do not arise.
