= Typist Gopu =

Indian actor (died 2019)

- Born: 1933 or 1934
- Died: 6 March 2019 (aged 85)
- Occupations: Film Actor, Stage Actor, Television Actor
- Years active: 1965–2007

Gopalarathnam, known by his stage name Typist Gopu, was an Indian actor known for comedy and supporting roles. He acted in over 600 stage plays and 400 films.

== Career ==
A native of Manakkal, Lalgudi in Trichy district, Gopalarathnam was active in college dramas during his B.Com. from Vivekananda College, Chennai and got introduced to the stage through his friend Nagesh in his drama troupe in 1955. In the 1959 play Nenje Nee Vaazhga, he played the role of a typist, which was praised and he got his name "Typist" Gopu. In 1965, he made his film debut in K. Balachandar's movie Naanal and went on to act alongside major actors in the period. He later joined Y. G. Mahendran's United Amateur Artists. He received Kalaimamani in 2002. He also acted on comedy television serials after acting opportunities ceased to come.

== Filmography ==
This is partial filmography. You can expand it.

=== 1960s ===
Year	Film	Role	Notes
1965	Naanal		Debut film
1966	Sadhu Mirandal	Kadam Master	Special Appearance
1966	Madras To Pondicherry		
1967	Adhey Kangal		
1967	Aalayam		
1967	Karpooram		
1967	Anubavam Pudhumai		
1967	Anubavi Raja Anubavi		
1968	Uyarndha Manithan		
1968	Naalum Therinthavan		
1968	Galatta Kalyanam		
1968	Kadhal Vaaganam		
1968	Kallum Kaniyagum		
1968	Soappu Seeppu Kannadi		
1969	Vaa Raja Vaa		
1969	Ponnu Mappillai		
1969	Thirudan		Guest Role

=== 1970s ===
Year	Film	Role	Notes
1970	Thirumalai Thenkumari		
1970	Patham Pasali		
1970	Engirundho Vandhaal		
1970	Enga Mama	Koteeswaran's Hostel Warden	
1970	Dharisanam		
1970	Veettuku Veedu		
1971	Thenum Paalum		
1971	Thangaikkaaga		
1971	Kankatchi		
1972	Agathiyar		
1972	Kasethan Kadavulada	Dr.Irudhayam	
1972	Rani Yaar Kuzhanthai		
1973	Baghdad Perazhagi		
1973	Thedi Vandha Lakshmi		
1973	Bharatha Vilas		
1973	Nathaiyil Muthu		
1973	Kasi Yathirai		
1973	Alaigal		
1974	Dikkatra Parvathi		
1974	Urimaikural		
1974	Naan Avanillai		
1975	Dr. Siva		
1975	Yarukku Maappillai Yaro		
1975	Sonthangal Vaazhga		
1976	Unakkaga Naan		
1976	Nee Oru Maharani		
1976	Uthaman		
1976	Satyam		
1976	Mayor Meenakshi		
1976	Muthana Muthallavo		
1977	Sri Krishna Leela		
1977	Nallathukku Kalamillai		
1977	Avar Enakke Sontham		
1977	Palabishegham		
1977	Uyarndhavargal		
1978	General Chakravarthi		
1978	Kanchi Kamakshi		
1978	Ennai Pol Oruvan		
1979	Kuppathu Raja		
1979	Thaayillamal Naan Illai		

=== 1980s ===
Year	Film	Role	Notes
1980	Unnai Solli Kutramillai		
1982	Simla Special		
1984	Rajathanthiram	Waiter	
1984	Vaai Sollil Veeranadi		
1987	Vanna Kanavugal		
1988	Therkathi Kallan		
1988	Unnal Mudiyum Thambi		

=== 1990s ===
Year	Film	Role	Notes
1990	Nalla Kaalam Porandaachu		
1990	Keladi Kanmani		
1990	Ulagam Pirandhadhu Enakkaga		
1990	Madurai Veeran Enga Saami		
1990	En Kadhal Kanmani	Ramesh	
1990	Michael Madhana Kamarajan		
1991	Naadu Adhai Naadu		
1991	Adhikari		
1991	Vanakkam Vathiyare		
1991	Archana IAS		
1991	Idhayam		
1991	Thayamma		
1991	Rudra	Bank cashier	
1991	Pudhiya Raagam		
1992	Unnai Vaazhthi Paadugiren		
1992	Thirumathi Palanisamy		
1992	Idhuthanda Sattam		
1992	Naalaiya Theerpu		
1992	Oor Mariyadhai		
1992	Sugamana Sumaigal		
1992	Oor Mariyadhai		
1992	Pandiyan		
1993	Dhuruva Natchathiram		
1993	Walter Vetrivel		
1993	En Idhaya Rani		
1994	Pudhiya Mannargal		
1994	En Pondatti Nallava		
1994	Magalir Mattum		
1994	Pondattiye Deivam		
1995	Paattu Padava		
1996	Maanbumigu Maanavan		
1998	Kumbakonam Gopalu	Tenant	
1998	Golmaal		

=== 2000s ===
Year	Film	Role	Notes
2000	Manasu		
2007	Periyar		Last film

== Television ==
- Vasool Chakravarthy
- Veetukku Veedu Looty
- Mr. Brain
- Thuppariyum Sambu
