= Vanna Kanavugal =

- Theatrical release poster
- Directed by: Ameerjan
- Written by: Vairamuthu (dialogues)
- Story by: M. T. Vasudevan Nair
- Produced by: Rajam Balachander; Pushpa Kandaswamy
- Starring: Karthik; Murali; Jayashree
- Cinematography: C. S. Ravibabu
- Edited by: S. S. Nazeer
- Music by: V. S. Narasimhan
- Production company: Kavithalayaa Productions
- Release date: 10 July 1987
- Running time: 137 minutes
- Country: India
- Language: Tamil

Vanna Kanavugal (transl. Colourful Dreams) is a 1987 Indian Tamil-language film directed by Ameerjan and produced by Kavithalayaa Productions. The film stars Karthik, Murali, and Jayashree. It is a remake of the 1984 Malayalam film Adiyozhukkukal. The film, which notably features no songs, was released on 9 July 1987 and became a commercial success.

== Plot ==
The lives of Kannappan and Anandhi cross paths in a lovely coastal town. Kannappan is a boat owner and does odd jobs like smuggling. An upright and fierce individual who stands up for love and friendship. He is in love with Sita. When his best friend Arumugam (who later becomes a rich goon) is attacked by some rowdy elements, Kannappan kills some people and ends up in jail. His only request to Arumugam is to guard his boat and more importantly Sita. When he returns from jail he realises that Arumugam has not only usurped his boat but the love of his life Sita. Jaded, Kannappan returns to his dilapidated home along with friend Kutiyappa. Takes to drinking. Anandhi visits her sister who lives in the same coastal town .Her sister's husband runs a prostitusion racket and Anandhi escapes the clutches of her cruel brother in law only to find refuge in Kannappan's home. Their lives are constantly under threat. One such instance Kannappan is saved by Moorthy, an unemployed youth who gets in to town to recover his money from a scamster. Moorthy also ends up living with Kannappan. Kannappan wants Anandhi to have a secure future and wants Anandhi to marry Moorthy (who by now is employed). How all this is juxtaposed against a love triangle (Moorthy - Anandhi - Kannappan) and in the back drop of the constant harm posed by their enemies makes for an interesting end.

== Cast ==
- Karthik as Kannappan
- Murali as Moorthy
- Jayashree as Anandhi
- Charle
- Nassar
- Sundar
- Anand
- Typist Gopu
- Sudha
- Baby Aarthi

== Production ==
Vanna Kanavugal marks the feature film debut of Anand. The dialogues were written by Vairamuthu.

== Release and reception ==
Vanna Kanavugal was released on 9 July 1987. The Indian Express wrote, "Dreams glitter, but reality is forbidding. This truism blossoms in contrasty colours in Vanna Kanavugal" [...] Karthik has shown that he can play the tough guy too". Jayamanmadhan of Kalki appreciated the lack of songs, the dialogues, and the outdoor photography, but felt that the film had an abundance of unnecessary characters. Although Ameerjan was sceptical about the film's commercial viability due to its lack of songs, the film was a success and ran for over 100 days in theatres.

== See also ==
- List of Indian films without songs
