= Anney Anney =

- Title card
- Directed by: Mouli
- Written by: Mouli
- Starring: Mouli; Viji; Sumithra
- Cinematography: Devi Prasad
- Edited by: N. R. Kittu
- Music by: Ilaiyaraaja
- Production company: Kalaivani
- Release date: 7 July 1983
- Country: India
- Language: Tamil

Anney Anney (transl. Brother! Brother!) is a 1983 Indian Tamil-language film written and directed by Mouli. He stars alongside Viji and Sumithra. The film was released on 7 July 1983, and was a hit at the box office.

== Cast ==
- Mouli as Krishnagiri
- Viji as Rathna
- Sumithra as Durga Krishnagiri
- Vanitha Krishnachandran as Parvathy (Paaru)
- Charle as Faffu
- V. K. Ramasamy as 'Mountbatten' Mahadevan
- Leo Prabhu as Shyam
- Ramakrishna as Malli
- Gundu Kalyanam

== Soundtrack ==
Soundtrack was composed by Ilaiyaraaja, with lyrics written by Vaali.

Track listing
No.	Title	Singer(s)	Length
1.	"Andha Naal"	Malaysia Vasudevan	4:32
2.	"Uruginen"	S. P. Balasubrahmanyam, S. Janaki	4:34
3.	"Vaikira Idathil"	Malaysia Vasudevan	4:04
4.	"Vettu Vedipom"	Malaysia Vasudevan	4:04
Total length:			17:14

== Critical reception ==
Jayamanmadhan of Kalki praised the humour but felt the film had a play kind of feel. Balumani of Anna praised the acting and music and called it an entertaining film.
