= Ameerjan =

Indian film director

- Born: 9 April 1942; Salem, Tamil Nadu, India
- Died: 17 March 2015 (aged 72); Chennai, Tamil Nadu, India
- Occupation: Film director
- Years active: 1984–1991; 2000-2004

Ameerjan was an Indian film director, who has directed Tamil films. He was primarily active in the 1984-1991 and is most noted for his work on films featuring actors Murali and Karthik.

== Career ==
Ameerjan began his career as a protégé to director K. Balachander and then won critical acclaim for his directorial debut in 1984 with Poovilangu, which starred actors Murali and Kuyili in the lead roles. He went on to direct more than 20 feature films, both in Tamil and Telugu, often collaborating with actors Murali and Karthik. Ameerjan also worked on a high-budget action film Siva (1989) featuring Rajinikanth as well as on socially relevant films such as Thulasi (1987). As opportunities declined, he began assisting K. Balachander when he started making television shows and also directed his own shows. In 2006, he also held the position of secretary in the Directors' Association of Tamil film makers.

Ameerjan suffered a cardiac arrest and died on 17 March 2015 in Saligramam, leaving behind his wife, son and a daughter.

== Filmography ==
Year	Film
1984	Poovilangu
1984	Pudhiavan
1984	Nenjathai Allitha
1985	Elan Kandru
1986	Odangal
1986	Natpu
1986	Dharma Pathini
1987	Thulasi
1987	Vanna Kanavugal
1988	Uzhaithu Vaazha Vendum
1989	Siva
1990	Unnai Solli Kutramillai
1990	Thai Maasam Poo Vaasam
1991	Kurumbukkaran
1991	Vanakkam Vathiyare
2000	Chinna Chinna Kannile
2004	Kadhal Saregama
