= Vairamuthu =

Indian film lyricist, poet, and novelist

𝐊𝐀𝐕𝐈𝐏𝐄𝐑𝐀𝐑𝐀𝐒𝐔 Vairamuthu
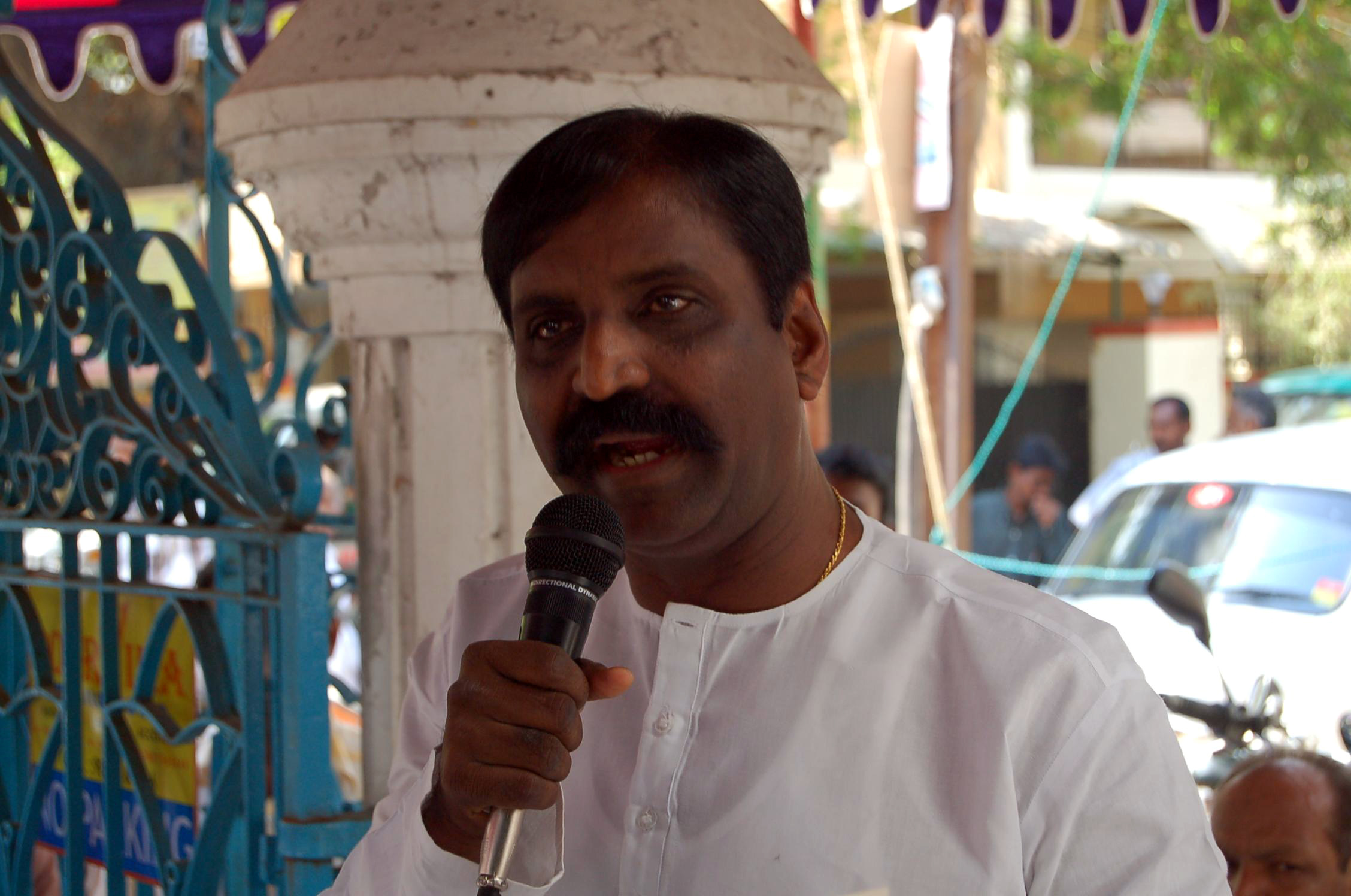
- Born: Vairamuthu Ramasamy; 13 July 1953 (age 73); Mettoor, Madurai, Madras State, India (present-day Vadugapatti, Theni, Tamil Nadu, India)
- Education: Pachaiyappa's College, Chennai
- Occupations: Poet; lyricist
- Spouse: Ponmani Vairamuthu
- Children: Madhan Karky; Kabilan Vairamuthu
- Writing career
- Years active: 1980–present
- Notable works: Kallikaattu Ithihaasam; Karuvaachi Kaaviyam; Moondram Ulagapor; Thamizhatruppadai
- Notable awards: Padma Shri (2003),Padma Bhushan (2014),Sahitya Akademi Award (2003),Jnanpith Award (2025).

Vairamuthu Ramasamy (born 13 July 1953) is an Indian lyricist, poet, and novelist who works primarily in the Tamil film industry. He is also a prominent figure in contemporary Tamil literature.

After earning a master's degree from Pachaiyappa's College in Chennai, Vairamuthu worked as a translator while establishing himself as a poet. He entered the Tamil film industry in 1980 with Nizhalgal, directed by Bharathiraja with music composed by Ilaiyaraaja. Over a career spanning more than four decades, he has written thousands of film songs and poems.

Vairamuthu has won the National Film Award for Best Lyrics seven times, the most by any lyricist. He received the Padma Shri in 2003 and the Padma Bhushan in 2014. He also received the Sahitya Akademi Award in 2003 for his novel Kallikattu Ithikasam. In 2026, he received the 60th Jnanpith Award, conferred for the year 2025, in recognition of his contribution to Indian literature. The award was presented on 13 July 2026, his 73rd birthday.

== Early life ==
Vairamuthu was born on 13 July 1953, to Ramasamy Thevar and his wife Angammal, who were agriculturalists based in the village of Mettoor, in the district of Theni, of Tamil Nadu in a Kallar (Thevar) family. In 1957, his family was forced to move to Vadugapatti, another village in the Theni district, due to the construction of Vaigai Dam across the river Vaigai, which led to evacuation of 14 villages (including Mettur). In his new surroundings, he also took up agriculture in addition to his academics.

From a very young age, Vairamuthu was drawn towards the language and literature of Tamil. The Dravidian movement in Tamil Nadu during the 1960s, made a significant impression on his youth and he was inspired by several prominent individuals associated with language, such as Periyar E. V. Ramasamy, 'Perarignar' Annadurai, Kalaignar M. Karunanidhi, Subramania Bharathi, Bharathidasan and Kannadasan. He began writing poems from the age of ten and by his early teens, he was noted as a prominent orator and poet in his school. At the age of fourteen, he wrote a group of venba poems, having been inspired by Thiruvalluvar’s Tirukkuṛaḷ.

=== Education and early career ===
During the stint of his under-graduation at Pachaiyappa’s College in Chennai, he was acclaimed as a speaker and poet. In his sophomore year, he published his first anthology of poems, titled Vaigarai Megangal ('Clouds at Dawn'), at the age of nineteen. The book was prescribed as part of the curriculum in the Women's Christian College, giving Vairamuthu the distinction of being a writer whose work was part of a syllabus, while he was still a student. He completed a 2 year Master's program in Arts in the field of Tamil literature at the Madras University.

After his education, he began his professional career at the Tamil Nadu Official Language Commission in the mid-1970s, as a translator of law books and documents from English to Tamil, working under Justice Maharajan. In addition to this, he continued writing poetry, bringing out a second anthology of poems in 1979, titled Thiruthi Ezhuthiya Theerpugal ('Revised and rewritten').

=== Family and personal life ===
He is married to Ponmani, a Tamil scholar and former professor at the Meenakshi College for Women. They have two sons, Madhan Karky and Kabilan, who both work as lyricists and dialogue writers for Tamil films.

== Film career ==
=== Debut and early years ===
Upon reading his poems, he was signed on as a lyricist by the director Bharathiraja for the film Nizhalgal in the year 1980. The first song he wrote in his career, was "Pon Maalai Pozhuthu", which was composed by "Isaignani" Ilaiyaraaja and sung by S.P. Balasubrahmanyam. The first song of his that was released, was "Batrakali Uttamaseeli" (also composed by Ilaiyaraaja) from the film Kaali, which was released four months before Nizhalgal. Vairamuthu quit his career as a translator to work full-time in the film industry.

After Nizhalgal, Vairamuthu and Ilaiyaraaja kicked off a successful collaboration which would last a little more than half a decade. Their joint association with director Bharathiraja, led to some of the most critically acclaimed soundtracks such as Alaigal Oivathillai (which won Vairamuthu his first Tamil Nadu State Film Award for Best Lyricist), Kaadhal Oviyam, Mann Vasanai, Pudhumai Penn, Oru Kaidhiyin Diary, Muthal Mariyathai (which won Vairamuthu his first National Award for Best Lyricist) and Kadalora Kavithaigal. During the period he was working with Ilaiyaraaja, Vairamuthu collaborated with director Mani Ratnam for the first time in Idhaya Kovil in 1985, penning the song "Naan Padum Mouna Ragam" (which inspired the title of Ratnam's breakthrough Mouna Ragam, which was released in the following year).

Besides their work with Bharathiraja, the combination of the lyricist and the composer tasted success with more soundtracks such as Raja Paarvai, Ninaivellam Nithya, Nallavanukku Nallavan, Salangai Oli and Sindhu Bhairavi (the latter two yielding Ilaiyaraaja his first two National Awards for Music Direction).

Vairamuthu also worked as a lyricist with composer M.S. Viswanathan on the film Thanneer Thanneer and V. S. Narasimhan on the films Achamillai Achamillai and Kalyana Agathigal. All three films were directed by K. Balachander.

In 1986, he debuted as screenwriter for the film Natpu, directed by Ameerjan. He later had three further collaborations as a writer with the director in Thulasi (1987), Vanna Kanavugal (1987) and Vanakkam Vathiyare (1991). He also penned the dialogues for Andru Peytha Mazhaiyil (1989), which was directed by the National award-winning cinematographer Ashok Kumar.

=== Split with Ilaiyaraaja ===
After K. Balachander's Punnagai Mannan (1986), Vairamuthu and Ilaiyaraaja parted ways. After their split, Vairamuthu's career stalled for the next five years, when he worked largely on lyrics for other language films that were dubbed in Tamil. His association with director Bharathiraja remained intact, as the duo worked together in the late 1980s on films such as Vedham Pudhithu (composed by Devendran) and Kodi Parakuthu (composed by Hamsalekha). He also worked with Bollywood composers such as R. D. Burman in the film Ulagam Pirandhadhu Enakkaga and the duo Laxmikant–Pyarelal on Uyire Unakkaga.

During this time, he also collaborated with composer Chandrabose on the films Shankar Guru, Makkal En Pakkam, Manithan, Katha Nayagan, Thaimel Aanai, Paatti Sollai Thattathe, Vasanthi, Raja Chinna Roja and Sugamana Sumaigal. They last worked together on Aadhikkam, which was released in 2005.

=== Resurgence ===
In 1991, K. Balachander signed Vairamuthu as a lyricist for three of his productions, which were set for release in the following year: Vaaname Ellai, Annaamalai and Roja. The first film (directed by Balachander himself) was composed by M.M. Keeravani (credited as 'Maragadhamani' in Tamil), the second (directed by Suresh Krissna) had music scored by Deva, and the third (directed by Mani Ratnam) by a debuting composer named A.R. Rahman.

Roja was director Mani Ratnam's first film after his split with composer Ilaiyaraaja, and its music is widely regarded as changing the face of not just Tamil, but Indian music. The song "Chinna Chinna Aasai", the first film song which Rahman had composed, won Vairamuthu his second National award for the Best Lyricist. The album secured A.R. Rahman the National Award for the Best Music Direction, a first for a debutant.

Following Roja, the combination of A.R. Rahman and Vairamuthu became heavily sought after, collaborating on several films throughout the next 25 years. Their continued association with director Mani Ratnam (which spans the length of Rahman's career), led to critical and commercial success on films such as Thiruda Thiruda (1993), Bombay (1995), Alai Payuthey (2000), Kannathil Muthamittal (2002), Aayutha Ezhuthu (2004), Raavanan (2010), Kadal (2013), O Kadhal Kanmani (2015). Kaatru Veliyidai (2017) and Chekka Chivantha Vaanam (2018). Four out of Vairamuthu's seven National awards for the Best Lyricist came out of his association with Rahman (on films such as Roja, Karuththamma, Pavithra; he was recognized by the National awards committee for his efforts on both these films in 1995, Sangamam and Kannathil Muthamittal) and four out of Rahman's six National Awards came from his association with Vairamuthu (on the films Roja, Minsara Kanavu, Kannathil Muthamittal and Kaatru Veliyidai). Singers P. Unnikrishnan, S.P. Balasubrahmanyam, Shankar Mahadevan, Swarnalatha, K.S. Chitra and Shashaa Tirupati have all won National awards for their work in collaboration with this duo.

In addition to their association with Mani Ratnam, the team of Rahman and Vairamuthu are also noted for their collaboration with director Shankar (on Gentleman, Kaadhalan, Indian, Jeans, Mudhalvan, Sivaji, and Enthiran), Bharathiraja (on Kizhakku Cheemayile, Karuththamma, Anthimanthaarai and Taj Mahal), K. S. Ravikumar (on Muthu, Padayappa and Varalaru) and Rajiv Menon (on Minsara Kanavu and Kandukonden Kandukonden). Some of their other popular films include Pudhiya Mugam, Duet, May Madham, Rhythm, Kochadaiiyaan, and 24.

Vairamuthu is also known for his work in the 90s and early 2000s with composer Deva, on popular soundtracks such as Annamalai, Baasha, Aasai, Once More, Arunachalam, Nerukku Ner, Vaalee, Kushi, and Panchathanthiram. He has also worked extensively with Bharadwaj (on popular soundtracks such as Kaadhal Mannan, Pooveli, Amarkkalam, Rojavanam, Parthen Rasithen, Rojakootam, Gemini, Jay Jay, Attagasam, Vasool Raja MBBS, Idhaya Thirudan, Vattaram, Asal and Aayirathil Iruvar), Harris Jayaraj, D. Imman, Vidyasagar, Shankar–Ehsaan–Loy (on both their Tamil projects, Aalavandhan and Vishwaroopam), N. R. Raghunanthan (which secured him his sixth National Award for the film Thenmerku Paruvakaatru) and Yuvan Shankar Raja (the son of Ilaiyaraaja; their association yielded him his seventh National Award for the film Dharma Durai). During his nearly 40-year career, he has worked with over 150 music directors.

In addition to lyrics, Vairamuthu has also penned poems which feature as part of the dialogue, on films such as Duet, Iruvar (for the character played by Prakash Raj), and Aalavandhan (for the character of Nandu; played by Kamal Haasan). He has also penned lyrics for the theme songs of many Tamil television shows and jingles for advertisements, the most notable among them being the theme for the Tamil soap opera Chithi.

== Contribution to literature ==
Vairamuthu has written 37 books which include collections of poetry as well as novels in the Tamil language. Several of them have been translated into English, Hindi, Malayalam, Telugu, Kannada, Russian and Norwegian. He introduced the work of foreign poets to Tamil readers in his Ella Nadhiyilum En Odam. Over 2.6 million copies of his works have been sold. In 1991, four of his books were released on the same day in a grand manner in Madurai by the ex-Chief Minister Karunanidhi.

He has also been a speaker at many prominent Tamil conferences in the United States, United Kingdom, Russia, Australia, Japan, Canada, Hong Kong, China, Singapore, Malaysia, Thailand, United Arab Emirates, Kuwait, Oman, Maldives, Switzerland and Sri Lanka.

For his work in literature, he was also conferred the titles of Kavi Samrat ("King of Poetry") by former Indian Prime Minister Atal Bihari Vajpayee, Kaapiya Kavignar ("Epic Poet") by former Indian President A.P.J. Abdul Kalam and Kaviperarasu ("The Emperor of Poets") by former Tamil Nadu Chief Minister M. Karunanidhi.

== Notable works ==
Kallikkattu Ithikasam (The Saga of the Drylands)

Kallikkattu Ithikasam depicts the story of the people of a village who have turned refugees in independent India. In the 1950s, when Vaigai dam was constructed in Madurai District, 14 villages were vacated for creating the water catchment area. This novel narrates the tearful story of those refugees who lost their land under the water. The author is a child born to one such family and had lived through the misery of this migration in his childhood. The story portrays the tears, blood and pain of the villagers whose families were crushed as a result of modernization. The soul of the novel echoes the truth behind the values of agrarian India and the virtues of farmers which are eternal. This saga won Vairamuthu the Sahitya Akademi Award for the Best Literary Work in the year 2003, and has been translated into 22 languages. The novel sold over a lakh copies.

== Sexual Harassment allegations ==
Vairamuthu has faced allegations of sexual harassment and sexual misconduct from multiple women. The allegations received widespread public attention in 2018 during the Indian #MeToo movement. Vairamuthu has denied the accusations, describing them as false and motivated by ulterior motives, and has said that he was prepared to face legal proceedings.

== Other endeavors and philanthropic activities ==
Vairamuthu has set up a foundation, the Vairamuthu Educational Trust, which provides funding to underprivileged families for education of their children. He served as President of the Indo-Soviet Cultural Association. From the proceeds of the sales of Moondram Ulaga Poor, a sum of Rs. 11 lakh was donated to the widows of farmers who committed suicide.

He is the founder of the Vetri Tamizhar Peravai, which aims at uplifting society. He also donated a hospital building to the people of his native village of Karattuppatti, and started a library in the name of the poet Kannadasan, in his village of Vadugapatti. He has also made contributions to victims of war as well to those of natural calamities.

== Filmography ==
=== As writer ===
- Natpu (1986)
- Odangal (1986)
- Thulasi (1987)
- Vanna Kanavugal (1987)
- Andru Peytha Mazhaiyil (1989)
- Vanakkam Vathiyare (1991)
- Captain (1994)

== Awards and recognition ==
=== Film career ===
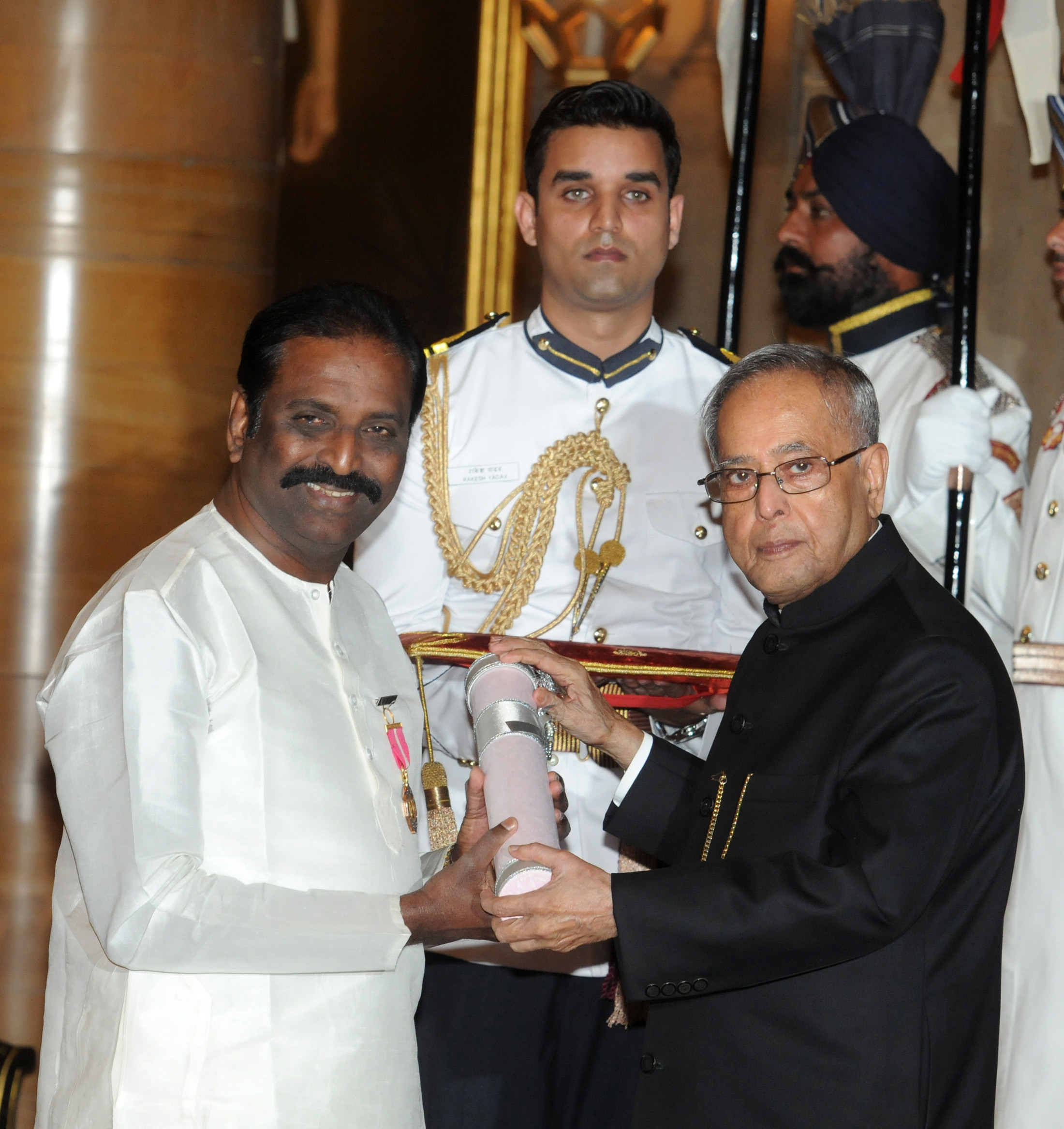
Vairamuthu in 2014 receiving Padma Bhushan award from former president Pranab Mukherjee

National Film Award for Best Lyrics

- 1985: All songs from Muthal Mariyathai
- 1992: "Chinna Chinna Aasai" from Roja
- 1994: "Poralae Ponnuthayi" from Karuththamma; "Uyirum Neeye" from Pavithra
- 1999: "Mudhal Murai Killipparthaein" from Sangamam
- 2002: "Oru Theivam Thantha Poovey" from Kannathil Muthamittal
- 2010: "Kallikkaattil Perandha Thaayae" from Thenmerku Paruvakaatru
- 2016: "Endha Pakkam" from Dharma Durai

Filmfare Award for Best Lyricist – Tamil

- 2005 "Oh Sukumari" from Anniyan – Won
- 2008: "Vaa Vaa" from Abhiyum Naanum – Nominated
- 2009: "Nenje Nenje" from Ayan – Nominated
- 2010: "Kadhal Anukkal" from Enthiran; "Usure Poguthey" from Raavanan – Nominated
- 2011: "Sara Sara" from Vaagai Sooda Vaa – Won
- 2012: "Para Para" from Neerparavai – Nominated
- 2013: "Chithirai Nila" from Kadal; "Sengaade" from Paradesi – Nominated
- 2014: "Ovvondrai Thirudigarai" from Jeeva – Nominated
- 2016: "Endha Pakkam" from Dharma Durai – Nominated
- 2017: "Vaan" from Kaatru Veliyidai – Won

Tamil Nadu State Film Award for Best Lyricist

- 1981-1982: "Vizhiyil Vizhundu" and "Kadhal Oviyam" from Alaigal Oivathillai
- 1995: "Poralae Ponnuthayi" from Karuththamma
- 1996: "Oruvan Oruvan" from Muthu; "Kannaalanae" from Bombay
- 2000: "Mudhal Murai Killipparthaein" from Sangamam
- 2005: "Oh Sukumari" and "Iyengaaru Veetu" from Anniyan
- 2007: All songs from Periyar

SIIMA Award for Best Lyricist – Tamil

- 2012: "Para Para" from Neerparavai – Nominated
- 2013: "Nenjukkulle" from Kadal – Nominated
- 2014: "Kandangi Kandangi" from Jilla – Nominated
- 2015: "Malargal Kettaen” from O Kadhal Kanmani – Won
- 2016: "Endha Pakkam" from Dharma Durai – Nominated
- 2017: "Vaan" from Kaatru Veliyidai – Nominated

Vijay Award for Best Lyricist

- 2007: "Kaatrin Mozhi" from Mozhi – Nominated
- 2008: "Vaa Vaa" from Abhiyum Naanum – Nominated
- 2009: "Nenje Nenje" from Ayan – Nominated
- 2010: "Arima Arima" from Enthiran; "Kallikkaatil Pirandha Thaaye" from Thenmerku Paruvakaatru – Won
- 2011: "Sara Sara" from Vaagai Sooda Vaa – Won
- 2013: "Nenjukkule" from Kadal – Nominated
- 2014: "Maatram Ondru" from Kochadaiiyaan – Nominated

=== Civilian Honors ===
- 2003: Padma Shri: For Distinguished Services in Literature and Education
- 2014: Padma Bhushan: For Distinguished Services in Literature and Education

=== Literary awards and honors ===
- 1999: S. P. Adithanar Literary Award for Best Tamil Novel for Thanneer Thesam
- 2003: Sahitya Akademi Award for Best Literary Work for Kallikkaattu Ithihaasam
- 2009: Sadhana Samman for contributions to Indian literature through poetry, novels and lyrics.
- 2013: Ilakkiya Sinthanai Award for Best Tamil Novel for Moondram Ulaga Por
- 2013: Tansri K.R. Somasundaram Literature Foundation Award for Best Novel in Tamil Literature for Moondram Ulaga Por
- 2018: Federation of Indian Chambers of Commerce & Industry's Book of the Year Award for Nākapani Vaṉkā Itihāsh (Hindi version of Kallikkaattu Ithihaasam)

=== Other honors ===
Tamil Nadu State Government Awards

- 1990: Kalaimamani Award
- 1990: Paavendhar Award

Honorary doctorates

- 2007: Tamil Nadu Open University
- 2008: Madurai Kamaraj University
- 2009: Bharathiar University
- 2021: O. N. V. Literary Award instituted by the ONV Cultural Academy (declined)

== Published works ==
In Tamil:

- Vaikarai Megangal (1972)
- Thiruthi Ezhuthiiya Theerpugal (1979)
- Innoru Dhesiya Geetham (1982)
- Kavi Raajan Kadhai (1982)
- Idhu Varai Naan (1983) (his autobiography at the age of 28)
- En Pazhaiya Panai Oolaigal (1983)
- Vaanam Thottuvidum Thooramthan (1983)
- En Jannalin Vazhiye (1984)
- Mounathin Sapthangal (1984)
- Kalvettugal (1984)
- Kodi Marathin Vergal (1984)
- Kelvigalaal Oru Velvi (1984)
- Ratha Dhaanam (1985)
- Sirpiye Unnai Sethukukiren (1985)
- Netru Potta Kolam (1985)
- Meendum En Thottilukku (1986)
- Ella Nadhiyilum En Odam (1989)
- Vadugapatti Mudhal Volga Varai (1989)
- Indha Pookkal Virpanaikkalla (1991)
- Kaavi Nirathil oru Kaadhal (1991)
- Indha Kulathil Kal Erinthavargal (1991)
- Oru Porkkalamum Irandu Pookkalum (1991)
- Sigarangalai Nokki (1992)
- Idhanal Sakalamaanavargalukkum (1992)
- Villodu Vaa Nilave (1994)
- Thanneer Thesam (1996)
- Thamizhukku Niram Undu (1997)
- Peyyena Peyyum Mazhai (1999)*
- Vairamuthu Kavithaikal (2000)
- Kallikkaattu Ithihaasam (2001)
- Konjam Theneer Niraiya Vaanam (2005)
- Oru Giramathu Paravaiyum Sila kadalgalum (2005)
- Karuvaachi Kaaviyam (2006)
- Paarkadal (2008)
- Aayiram Paadalgal (2011)
- Moondram Ulaga Por (2013)
- Vairamuthu Sirukathaikal (2015)
- Tamizhatruppadai (2019)
- valluvar marai vairamuthu urai(2025)

Works Published in other Languages:

- Drops That Hop Without A Stop (Selected poems in English) – 2000 – Translated by Dr Vishnu Priya, Published by Hindi Hridaya, Chennai.
- A Drop in Search of the Ocean (Selected poems in English) – 2003 – Translated by Balan Menon, Published by Rupa & Co., New Delhi
- Vairamuthu Baavani (Selected poems in Hindi) – 2003 – Translated by Kamakshi subramaniam, Published by Hindi Hridaya, Chennai
- Bindhu Sindhu Ki Oor (Selected poems in Hindi) – 2004 – Translated by Dr Vishnu Priya, Published by Rajkamal Prakashan Pvt Ltd, New Delhi
- God Morgen Lyrikk (Selected Lyrics in Norwegian) – 2004 – Translated by Kowsihaa Gowrithasan, Published by Kowsihaa Gowrithasan, Norge
- Vairamuthu Ravara Muvathmuru Kavithegalu – 2009 (Selected poems in Kannada) – Translated by Prof. Malarvili, Published by Christ University Kannada, Bangalore.
- Siruthu Neram Manithanayi Irunthavan – 2017 (Selected short stories in Malayalam) – Translated by K. S. Venkitachalam, Published by Mathrubhumi Books, Kozhikode
- Nākapani Vaṉkā Itihāsh - Hindi (Kallikkattu Ithihaasam) – 2017 – (Sahitya Akademi Award Winning Novel & FICCI Book of the Year Award –2018) – Translated by H.Balasubramaniam, Published by Sahitya Akademi, New Delhi
- Kalligaadina Ithihaasa - Kannada (Kallikkattu Ithihaasam) – 2021 – (Sahitya Akademi Award Winning Novel & FICCI Book of the Year Award –2018) – Translated by Malarvizhi.K, Published by Sahitya Akademi, New Delhi

== See also ==
- List of Sahitya Akademi Award winners for Tamil
- Lists of Padma Shri award recipients
- Lists of Padma Shri award recipients
- List of Indian writers
- List of Tamil-language writers
