= Deva discography =

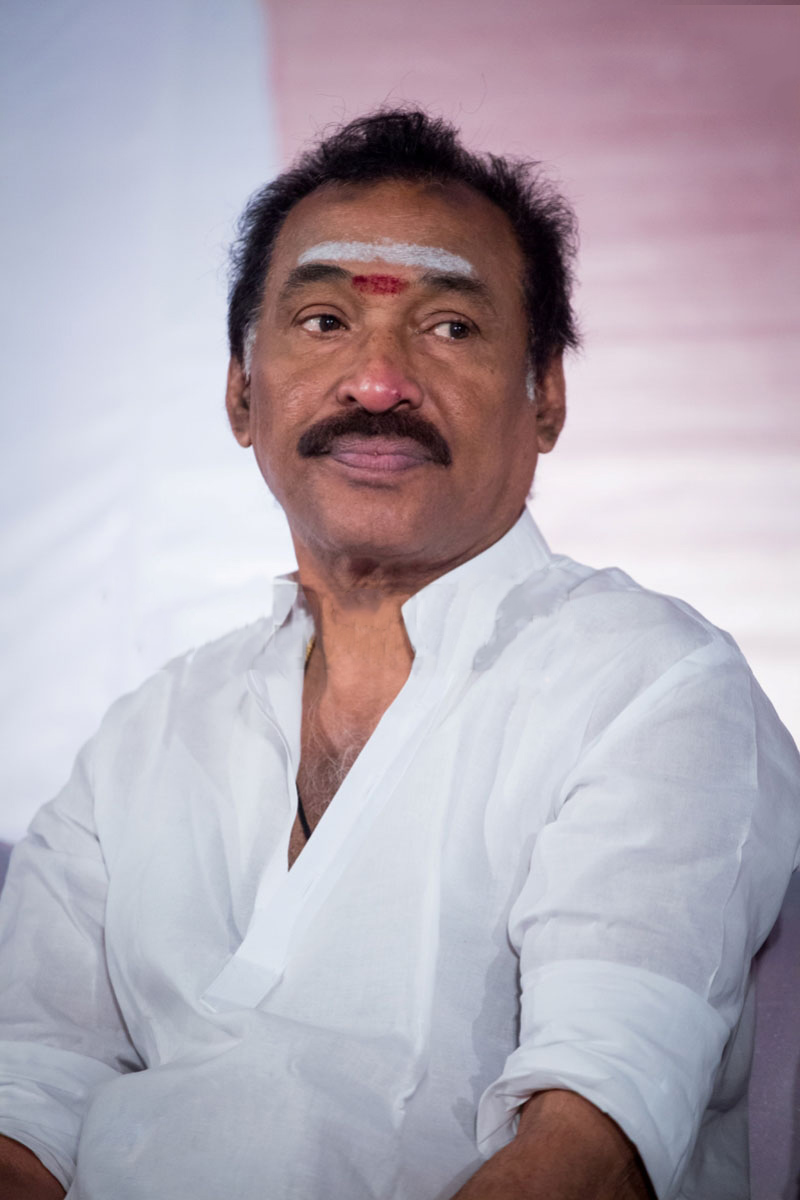
Deva in 2015

Devanesan "Deva" Chokkalingam (1950–2026) was an Indian composer and singer who predominantly worked in Tamil cinema. He composed songs and provided background music for Tamil, Kannada, Telugu, and Malayalam films. Deva composed music for more than 400 films. His career lasted from 1988 until his death in 2026.

== Discography ==
=== Tamil films ===
Year	Film title	Notes
1986	Maattukara Mannaru	Debut film as a composer
1989	Manasukketha Maharasa	
1989	Adhikaalai Subhavelai	Not Released
1990	Vaigasi Poranthachu	Winner Tamil Nadu State Film Award for Best Music Director
1990	Namma Ooru Poovatha	
1990	Mannukketha Maindhan	Not Released
1991	Naadu Adhai Naadu	
1991	Pudhu Manithan	
1991	Marikozhundhu	
1991	Aatha Un Koyilile	
1991	Mill Thozhilali	
1991	Vaidehi Kalyanam	
1991	Mangalyam Thanthunane	
1991	Vasanthakala Paravai	
1991	Kizhakku Karai	
1991	Oyilattam	
1991	Vaasalil Oru Vennila	
1991	En Pottukku Sonthakkaran	
1991	Vaidehi Vandhachu	
1991	Thoothu Po Chellakkiliye	
1991	Thambi Oorukku Pudhusa	
1991	Nadodi Kadhal	Not Released
1991	Neelakuyile Neelakuyile	Not Released
1992	Brahmachari	
1992	Ilavarasan	
1992	Periya Gounder Ponnu	
1992	Government Mappillai	
1992	Kasthuri Manjal	
1992	Thangarasu	25th Film
1992	Therku Theru Machan	
1992	Tamil Ponnu	
1992	Oor Mariyadhai	
1992	Unakkaga Piranthen	
1992	Pokkiri Thambi	
1992	Pudhusa Padikkiren Paattu	
1992	Kizhakku Velathachu	
1992	Amma Vanthachu	
1992	Annaamalai	
1992	Vasantha Malargal	
1992	Pattathu Raani	
1992	Suriyan	
1992	Kottai Vaasal	
1992	Pondatti Rajyam	
1992	Mouna Mozhi	
1992	Kizhakku Veedhi	
1992	Samundi	
1992	Natchathira Nayagan	
1992	Solaiyamma	
1992	Sooriya Namaskaram	Not Released
1993	Pudhu Piravi	
1993	Madurai Meenakshi	
1993	Suriyan Chandiran	
1993	Madhumathi	
1993	Vedan	50th Film
1993	Idhaya Nayagan	
1993	Munarivippu	
1993	Band Master	
1993	Nallathe Nadakkum	
1993	Thanga Pappa	
1993	Pass Mark	
1993	Maravan	
1993	Moondravadhu Kann	
1993	Karuppu Vellai	
1993	Akkarai Cheemayile	
1993	Rajadurai	
1993	Kattabomman	
1993	Muthupandi	
1993	Purusha Lakshanam	
1993	Rojavai Killathe	
1993	Kizhakke Varum Paattu	
1993	Senthoorapandi	
1993	Shenbagam	
1993	Nee Oru Thanipiravi	Not Released
1994	Veettai Paaru Naattai Paaru	
1994	Subramaniya Swamy	
1994	Chinna Muthu	
1994	Aranmanai Kaavalan	
1994	En Rajangam	
1994	Indhu	75th Film
1994	Vaa Magale Vaa	
1994	Namma Annachi	
1994	Pathavi Pramanam	
1994	Sevatha Ponnu	
1994	Manasu Rendum Pudhusu	
1994	Maindhan	
1994	Rasigan	
1994	Watchman Vadivel	
1994	Thamarai	
1994	Sarigamapadani	
1994	En Aasai Machan	
1994	Killadi Mappillai	
1994	Raja Pandi	
1994	Thai Maaman	
1994	Pattukottai Periyappa	
1994	Ilaignar Ani	
1994	Jallikattu Kaalai	
1994	Veera Padhakkam	
1994	Nila	
1994	Magudikkaran	
1994	Pandiyanin Rajyathil	
1994	Thaai Manasu	
1994	Manja Virattu	
1994	Kizhakku Pakkam Kathiru	Not Released
1994	Maappillai Thozhan	Not Released
1995	Karuppu Nila	
1995	Kattumarakaaran	Songs by Ilaiyaraja. Background Score by Deva
1995	Baashha	
1995	Veluchami	100th Film
1995	Gangai Karai Paattu	
1995	Deva	
1995	Chinna Mani	
1995	En Pondatti Nallava	
1995	Thirumoorthy	
1995	Chellakannu	
1995	Sandhaikku Vandha Kili	
1995	Rani Maharani	
1995	Thamizhachi	
1995	Anbu Magan	
1995	Marumagan	
1995	Pullakuttikaran	
1995	Gandhi Pirantha Mann	
1995	Chakravarthy	
1995	Vishnu	
1995	Nadodi Mannan	
1995	Aasai	Winner Tamil Nadu State Film Award for Best Music Director
1995	Sindhu Bath	
1995	Thaikulame Thaikulame	
1995	Aakaya Pookal	
1995	Ilavarasi	
1995	Seethanam	
1995	Varraar Sandiyar	125th Film
1995	Mannai Thottu Kumbidanum	
1995	Dear Son Maruthu	
1995	Karutha Machan	Not Released
1996	Parambarai	
1996	Thayagam	
1996	Thirumbi Paar	
1996	Vaanmathi	
1996	Mahaprabhu	
1996	Kalloori Vaasal	
1996	Summa Irunga Machan	
1996	Puthiya Parasakthi	
1996	Mappillai Manasu Poopola	
1996	Maanbumigu Maanavan	
1996	Kaalam Maari Pochu	The song "Vaadi Pottapulla Veliye" is remixed in Love Oh Love (2026).
1996	Pudhu Nilavu	
1996	Veettukulle Thiruvizha	
1996	Kadhal Kottai	
1996	Tamizh Selvan	
1996	Vishwanath	
1996	Sivasakthi	
1996	Parivattam	
1996	Avvai Shanmugi	
1996	Gokulathil Seethai	
1996	Kalki	
1996	Panchalankurichi	
1996	Senathipathi	
1996	Gopala Gopala	150th Film
1996	Deiva Saatchi	Not Released
1997	Dharma Chakkaram	
1997	Kaalamellam Kaathiruppen	
1997	Nalla Manasukkaran	
1997	Periya Thambi	
1997	Bharathi Kannamma	
1997	Nesam	
1997	Kaalamellam Kadhal Vaazhga	
1997	Ettupatti Rasa	
1997	Vaimaye Vellum	
1997	Mannava	
1997	Mappillai Gounder	
1997	Arunachalam	
1997	Vallal	
1997	Sishya	
1997	Pongalo Pongal	
1997	Pasamulla Pandiyare	
1997	Once More	
1997	Kaadhali	
1997	Pagaivan	
1997	Kadhal Palli	
1997	Sathi Sanam	
1997	Abhimanyu	
1997	Adimai Changili	
1997	Kalyana Vaibhogam	
1997	Nerukku Ner	The song "Aval Varuvala" is reused in the 2026 film With Love
1997	Pathhini	
1997	Aahaa..!	175th Film
1997	Periya Manushan	
1997	Porkkaalam	
1997	Vidukadhai	
1997	Thadayam	
1997	Rettai Jadai Vayasu	
1997	Pudhalvan	
1997	Adhanda Idhanda	Released in 2003
1997	Charumathi	Not Released
1997	Santharpam	Not Released
1998	Kaadhale Nimmadhi	
1998	Sundara Pandian	
1998	Vaettiya Madichu Kattu	
1998	Santhosham	
1998	Ninaithen Vandhai	
1998	Ponnu Velayira Bhoomi	200th Film
1998	Iniyavale	
1998	Priyamudan	
1998	Natpukkaga	
1998	Sandhippoma	
1998	En Aasai Rasave	
1998	Ellame En Pondattithaan	
1998	Kannedhirey Thondrinal	
1998	Unnudan	
1998	En Uyir Nee Thaane	
1998	Urimai Por	
1998	Veeram Vilanja Mannu	
1998	Pudhumai Pithan	
1998	Gurupaarvai	
1998	Sivappu Nila	
1998	Bhagavath Singh	
1998	Rosappoo Chinna Rosappoo	Not Released
1998	Rukkumani	Not Released
1998	Thambikku Thaai Manasu	Not Released
1999	Nee Enakku Uyiramma	
1999	Kallazhagar	
1999	Ninaivirukkum Varai	
1999	Unnai Thedi	
1999	Chinna Raja	
1999	Ullathai Killathe	
1999	Vaalee	
1999	Annan Thangachi	
1999	Anantha Poongatre	
1999	Nenjinile	
1999	Oruvan	
1999	Suyamvaram	1 Song
1999	Viralukketha Veekkam	
1999	Kanave Kalaiyadhe	
1999	Ponvizha	225th Film
1999	Kannodu Kanbathellam	
1999	Minsara Kanna	
1999	Anbulla Kadhalukku	
1999	Hello	
1999	Maanaseega Kadhal	
1999	Ooty	
1999	Pudhu Kudithanam	
1999	Iraniyan	
1999	Sundari Neeyum Sundaran Naanum	
1999	Unnaruge Naan Irundhal	
1999	Azhagarsamy	
1999	Aasaiyil Oru Kaditham	
1999	Kadhal Solla Vandhen	Not Released
2000	Eazhaiyin Sirippil	
2000	Thai Poranthachu	
2000	Mugavaree	
2000	Sandhitha Velai	
2000	Vallarasu	
2000	Veeranadai	
2000	Kushi	Winner Tamil Nadu State Film Award for Best Music Director
2000	Appu	
2000	Ennamma Kannu	
2000	Vetri Kodi Kattu	
2000	Koodi Vazhnthal Kodi Nanmai	
2000	Independence Day	
2000	Kannaal Pesavaa	
2000	Krodham 2	250th Film
2000	Sabhash	
2000	Unnai Kann Theduthey	
2000	Ninaivellam Nee	Co-composed by M. S. Viswanathan
2000	Uyirile Kalanthathu	
2000	Kannukku Kannaga	
2000	Vaanavil	
2000	Seenu	
2000	Manasu	
2000	Manu Needhi	
2000	Chandramathy	Not Released
2000	Kadhal Vandhiruchu	Not Released
2001	Looty	
2001	Engalukkum Kaalam Varum	
2001	En Purushan Kuzhandhai Maadhiri	
2001	Ninaikkatha Naalillai	
2001	Sri Raja Rajeshwari	
2001	Citizen	
2001	Love Channel	
2001	Dosth	
2001	Lovely	
2001	Kalakalappu	
2001	Chocklet	
2001	Maayan	
2001	Veettoda Mappillai	275th Film
2001	Kabadi Kabadi	
2001	Love Marriage	
2001	Azhagana Naatkal	
2001	Kadal Pookkal	
2001	Kottai Mariamman	
2001	Ulagai Vilai Pesava	Not Released
2002	Pammal K. Sambandam	
2002	Red	
2002	Vivaramana Aalu	
2002	Nettru Varai Nee Yaaro	
2002	123	
2002	Panchathanthiram	
2002	Maaran	
2002	Samasthanam	
2002	Bagavathi	
2002	Virumbugiren	
2002	Vinnodum Mugilodum	Not Released
2003	Annai Kaligambal	
2003	Chokka Thangam	
2003	Ramachandra	300th Film
2003	Military	
2003	Dum	
2003	Kadhal Sadugudu	
2003	Indru Mudhal	
2003	Success	
2003	Vani Mahal	
2003	Kadhal Kirukkan	Reused 1 song from Simhadriya Simha
2003	Thathi Thavadhu Manasu	
2003	6 Teens	Not Released
2003	Soori	
2003	Indru	
2004	Engal Anna	
2004	Adi Thadi	
2004	Kavithai	
2004	Jore	
2004	Super Da	
2004	Loves	
2004	Sound Party	
2004	Azhagesan	
2004	Gajendra	reused one song from Kadamba (2004)
2004	Maha Nadigan	
2004	Jaisurya	
2004	Ramakrishna	325th Film
2005	Devathayai Kanden	
2005	Girivalam	
2005	Englishkaran	
2005	Selvam	
2005	Varapogum Sooriyane	
2005	Sivakasi	Songs by his son Background Score Only
2005	Saadhuriyan	
2005	Vanakkam Thalaiva	
2005	Kadhalanathey	Not Released
2006	47A Besant Nagar Varai	
2006	Uyir Ezhuthu	Not Released
2006	Solli Addipen	Not Released
2007	Thirumagan	
2007	Nanbanin Kadhali	
2007	Manikanda	
2007	Adavadi	350th Film
2007	Viyabari	
2007	Moondram Pournami	movie released in 2023
2007	En Uyirinum Melana	
2007	Cheena Thaana 001	
2007	Pasupathi c/o Rasakkapalayam	
2008	Kodaikanal	
2009	Enga Raasi Nalla Raasi	
2009	Saamy Sonna Saridhan	
2009	Aarumugam	
2009	Suriyan Satta Kalloori	
2010	Sivappu Mazhai	
2010	Kutti Pisasu	
2010	Pen Singam	
2012	Mattuthavani	
2012	Kondaan Koduthaan	375th Film
2014	Dummy Tappasu	
2016	Kadhali Kanavillai	Unreleased film
2016	Mugappair Sri Kanaka Durga	
2017	Unnai Thottu Kolla Vaa	
2021	Sillu Vandugal	
2022	Amaichar	
2023	Jambu Maharishi	
2023	Kakkan	
2023	Va Varalam Va	
2025	Maanbumigu Parai	Yet to be Released
2025	Kannagi Nagar	
2026	Anantha	
2026	Siva Sambo	Score only
2026	Charukesi	
2026	Thiduk	

=== Kannada films ===
Year	Film title	Notes
1997	Raja	
1997	Amrutha Varshini	Filmfare Award for Best Music Director – Kannada; Dubbed in Tamil as Uyirinum Melaaga
1998	King	
2000	Independence Day	
2000	Galate Aliyandru	
2000	Jithendra	
2001	Vande Matharam	
2001	Kotigobba	Remake of Baasha; Reused two songs from said film Reused one song from Arunachalam
2002	Naanu Naane	Remake of Raja Hindustani; reused two songs from said film
2002	Nata (Note: In the movie credits, only Gurukiran is credited as the composer. In the audio soundtrack releases, both of them are credited.)	Remake of Priyamudan reused four songs from said film
2002	Sainika	
2002	Simhadriya Simha	Remake of Nattamai; reused one song from said film, reused one song from Kattabomman
2003	Shri Kalikamba	
2003	Vijayadashami	
2003	Raja Narasimha	Reused one song from Madhumathi (1993)
2004	Kadamba	Reused one song from Annamalai
2005	Vishnu Sena	
2008	Akasha Gange	
2010	Bombat Car	
2011	Olave Mandara	
2012	Super Shastri	
2016	Bheeshma	

=== Telugu films ===
Year	Film title	Notes
1992	Sreeman Brahmachari	
1992	Jagannatham and Sons	
1994	Bhale Pellam	Remake of Purusha Lakshanam (1993); reused three songs from said film.
1997	Master	
1998	Auto Driver	
1998	Tholi Prema	Dubbed in Tamil as Anandha Mazhai
1998	Greeku Veerudu	
1998	Love Story 1999	
2000	Bagunnara	Reused one song from Ninaivirukkum Varai (1999)
2002	Kalusukovalani	Composed only one song
2003	Naaga	Reused three songs from Kushi
2004	Naalo	Remake of Unnai Charanadaindhen (2003)
2005	Naayudamma	
2007	Vijayadasami	Remake of Sivakasi; Background score only, reused from said film
2010	Cara Majaka	

=== Malayalam films ===
Year	Film title	Notes
1996	The Prince	
1996	King Soloman	
2002	Phantom	

=== Hindi film ===
Year	Film title	Notes
1997	Chachi 420	Hindi film; BGM only Remake of Avvai Shanmugi

=== Television ===
- 2007 Vaira Nenjam
- 2007 Bharathi
- 2008 Thangamana Purushan
- 2009 Vilakku Vacha Nerathula
- 2013 Mahabharatham

=== As a playback singer ===
Year	Film title	Song(s)	Composer	Co-Singer
1991	Marikozhundhu	"Aalamarama Aalamarama"	Himself	
1991	Aatha Un Koyilile	"Thaimaasam Vandirichi"	Himself	
1992	Surieyan	"Laalaku Dole"	Himself	Mano & S. Janaki
1993	Suriyan Chandran	"Thalaiva Nalama"	Himself	Mano & Malgudi Subha
1993	Rajadurai	"Kaadu Varai"	Himself	
1993	Senthoorapandi	"Aadadhada Aadadhada"	Himself	
1994	Aranmanai Kaavalan	"Manushangala"	Himself	R. Sarathkumar
1994	En Rajangam	"Annanmaare Thambimaare"	Himself	
1994	Rasigan	"Thambi Konjam"	Himself	
1994	Ilaignar Ani	"Unathilai Naina"	Himself	
1995	Deva	"Deva Vara"	Himself	Shoba Chandrasekhar
1995	Deva	"Marumagane"	Himself	Krishnaraj
1995	Chinna Mani	"Chithirai Maasathu"	Himself	Ranga Babu
1995	Chinna Mani	"Kiliye Kiliye"	Himself	K. S. Chithra
1995	Chellakannu	"Kallu Kuriya"	Himself	Manorama
1995	Varraar Sandiyar	"Amman Kovil Gopurattil"	Himself	
1996	Vaanmathi	"Pillayarpatti Hero"	Himself	
1996	Kadhal Kottai	"Kavalaipadathe Sagothara"	Himself	
1996	Kadhal Kottai	"Vellarikka"	Himself	Krishnaraj
1996	Summa Irunga Machan	"Chandiranum Onnuthan"	Himself	
1996	Mappillai Manasu Poopola	"Naan Puthanum"	Himself	
1996	Maanbumigu Maanavan	"Mathavaram"	Himself	S. N. Surendar & Krishnaraj
1996	Gokulathil Seethai	"Gokulathu Kanna"	Himself	S. P. Balasubrahmanyam, K. S. Chithra & Baby Deepika
1996	Gopala Gopala	"Enna Annaikki"	Himself	
1997	Porkkaalam	"Oonam Oonam"	Himself	
1997	Nesam	"Natchathira Bangla"	Himself	Malgudi Subha
1997	Adimai Changili	"Kaanangatha Meenu"	Himself	Anuradha Sriram
1997	Dharma Chakkaram	"Putta Putta"	Himself	K. S. Chithra & Krishnaraj
1997	Nalla Manasukkaran	"Paattu Padippom"	Himself	Swarnalatha
1997	Ettupatti Rasa	"Bemasena"	Himself	
1997	Ettupatti Rasa	"Merku Seemaiyile"	Himself	Swarnalatha
1997	Vaimaye Vellum	"Bagalu Bagalu"	Himself	Malgudi Subha
1997	Vaimaye Vellum	"Dhinamthorum"	Himself	Malaysia Vasudevan
1997	Vallal	"Samba Samba"	Himself	S. P. Balasubrahmanyam & Anuradha Sriram
1997	Once More	"Chinna Chinna Kaadhal"	Himself	Malaysia Vasudevan, Krishnaraj & Anuradha Sriram
1997	Kaadhali	"Connemera"	Himself	
1997	Periya Manushan	"Thrissur Ther Azhage"	Himself	K. J. Yesudas
1997	Rettai Jadai Vayasu	"Mattikittan Mattikittan"	Himself	Anuradha Sriram
1998	Kaadhal Mannan	"Marimuthu Marimuthu"	Bharathwaj	
1998	Kaadhale Nimmadhi	"Vidha Vidhama"	Himself	
1998	Ninaithen Vandhai	"Manisha Manisha"	Himself	Sabesh & Krishnaraj
1998	Priyamudan	"White Lagaan"	Himself	
1998	Natpukkaga	"Meesakara Nanba"	Himself	
1998	Kannedhirey Thondrinal	"Salomiya"	Himself	
1998	Ponnu Velayira Bhoomi	"Poya Unn Moonjiyila"	Himself	Swarnalatha, Anuradha Sriram & Vadivelu
1998	Santhosham	"Kaadu Varai"	Himself	
1998	Santhosham	"Subramani"	Himself	Sabesh–Murali
1998	Sandhippoma	"Davadikkathe"	Himself	Murali
1998	Ellame En Pondattithaan	"Baalavaakkam Laila"	Himself	
1998	En Uyir Neethaane	"Nicobar"	Himself	Mano
1998	Urimai Por	"Aarambam Nallairukku"	Himself	
1998	Pudhumai Pithan	"Namma Kuppamellam"	Himself	
1998	Bhagavath Singh	"Naadu Namma Naadu"	Himself	
1999	Anantha Poongatre	"Meenatchi Meenatchi"	Himself	
1999	Anantha Poongatre	"Udhayam Theatre"	Himself	Sabesh
1999	Kallazhagar	"Vaararu Vaararu"	Himself	S. A. Rajkumar
1999	Ninaivirukkum Varai	"Thirupathi Ezhumalai Venkatesa"	Himself	Mano & Krishnaraj
1999	Ninaivirukkum Varai	"Arcottu Saalaiyile"	Himself	Sabesh
1999	Annan Thangachi	"Palana Palana"	Himself	Sabesh
1999	Nenjinile	"Sariya Thappa"	Himself	
1999	Viralukketha Veekkam	"Alli Alli"	Himself	
1999	Viralukketha Veekkam	Viralukketha Veekkam	Himself	
1999	Kanave Kalayadhe	"Vaanguda 420 Beeda"	Himself	Sabesh
1999	Pudhu Kudithanam	"May Maasam"	Himself	
1999	Iraniyan	"Varaan Paru"	Himself	
1999	Sundari Neeyum Sundaran Naanum	"Sundari Neeyum Sundaran Naanum"	Himself	
1999	Azhagarsamy	"Orange Color"	Himself	Sujatha
2000	Uyirile Kalanthathu	"Coca Cola Pole"	Himself	Sabesh
2000	Vetri Kodi Kattu	"Siruppu Varudhu"	Himself	
2000	Thai Poranthachu	"Sirippa Konjam"	Himself	
2000	Vallarasu	"Adyar Beach Oram"	Himself	
2000	Ennamma Kannu	"Anbudaiya Nanbanukku"	Himself	S. P. Balasubrahmanyam & Theni Kunjarammal
2000	Ennamma Kannu	"Koyambedu Kokila"	Himself	Sabesh–Murali
2000	Koodi Vazhnthal Kodi Nanmai	"Singara Chennaiyile"	Himself	
2000	Kannukku Kannaga	"Kaveri Aathangarai Oram"	Himself	
2001	Engalukkum Kaalam Varum	"Engalukkum Kalam Varum"	Himself	
2001	En Purushan Kuzhandhai Maadhiri	"Aadiya Aattam"	Himself	
2001	Love Channel	"Odatha Odathada"	Himself	Ganga & Naveen
2001	Kabadi Kabadi	"Top Tenla Dhool"	Himself	Krishnaraj
2001	Kadal Pookkal	"Ogama"	Himself	Ganga
2001	Kottai Mariamman	"Morandu Pudikathe"	Himself	
2001	Looty	"Velu Vadivel"	Himself	
2002	Virumbukiren	"Otharuva Pottukkulle"	Himself	
2002	Virumbukiren	"Enna Aachudi"	Himself	
2002	Naina	"Annamalai Annamalai"	Himself	Krishnaraj
2003	Military	"Mama Mama"	Himself	Sabesh–Murali, Ramji & Sundarrajan
2004	Adi Thadi	"Thagadu"	Himself	Tippu & Ganga
2004	Ramakrishna	Thila Dangu	Himself	
2004	Ramakrishna	"Peiyummazhiyamma"	Himself	Sadhana Sargam, Karthik, Paravai Muniyamma, Sabesh & Jayalakshmi
2004	Azhagesan	"Vaada Thambi"	Himself	
2004	En Purushan Kuzhandhai Maadhiri	"Aadiya Aattam"	Himself	
2004	Gajendra	"Oorukku Mudhal Vanakkam"	Himself	
2007	Thirumagan	"Poranthathu"	Himself	Tippu
2007	Adavadi	"Dindugal Poottu"	Himself	Sri Devisha Bharath
2007	En Uyirinum Melana	"Kakka Kakka"	Himself	
2007	Pasupathi c/o Rasakkapalayam	"Onnu Rendu Moonu"	Himself	
2008	Kodaikanal	"Kasu Kasu"	Archith & Malathy Lakshman	
2009	Modhi Vilayadu	"Modhi Vilayadu"	Colonial Cousins	Hariharan
2009	Thee	"Valliyamma"	Srikanth Deva	
2014	Maan Karate	"Open The Tasmac"	Anirudh Ravichander	Anirudh Ravichander
2015	Vandha Mala	"Aana Aavanna" "Aana Aavanna" (Remix)	Sam D Raj	
2015	Sakalakala Vallavan	"Bulb Vaangitten"	S. Thaman	Vivek & Ravi Mohan
2016	Anjala	"Tea Podu"	Gopi Sunder	
2016	Natpathigaram 79	"Sollu Sollu chellamma"	Deepak Nilambur	
2016	Theri	"Jithu Jilladi"	G. V. Prakash Kumar	Balachandran
2016	Enakku Veru Engum Kilaigal Kidayathu	"Kodambakkam Maru Peru"	S. N. Arunagiri	
2017	Attu	"Meraludhu Leraludhu"	Bobo Shashi	Nathan & Yuki
2017	Vilayattu Aarambam	"Adhiri Pudhiri"	Srikanth Deva	Micheal Augustin & Hembabika
2018	Annanukku Jai	"Thaarumaaraa Manasu"	Arrol Corelli	
2018	Jarugandi	"Aadupuli Aattam"	Bobo Shashi	
2019	Nethraa	"Asku Busku"	Srikanth Deva	Lakshmi
2019	Thavam	"Varama Nee"	Srikanth Deva	
2020	Mookuthi Amman	"Saami Kulasami"	Girishh	
2021	Karnan	"Manjanathi Puranam"	Santhosh Narayanan	Santhosh Narayanan & Reetha Anthony
2021	Take Diversion	"Mammaro"	Jose Franklin	
2022	Anbarivu	"Anbae Arivu"	Hiphop Tamizha	
2022	Hostel	"Hostel Gaana"	Bobo Shashi	
2022	Takku Mukku Tikku Thalam	"Takku Mukku"	Dharan Kumar	
2022	Therkathi Veeran	"Kadalamma"	Srikanth Deva	Poovaiyar
2023	Good Night	"PalaPattra"	Sean Roldan	
2023	Maamannan	"Nenjame Nenjame - Reprise(Film Version)"	A. R. Rahman	
2023	Venba	"Chellakutty"	Alpha Something	Video game soundtrack
2024	Lal Salaam	"Anbalane"	A. R. Rahman	
2024	Captain Miller	"Koranaaru"	G. V. Prakash Kumar	Santosh Hariharan & Alexander Babu
2024	Boat	"Thakida Thadhimi"	M. Ghibran	
2025	Madharas Mafia Company	"Machi Nee Paadu Daa"	Srikanth Deva	
2026	Thiduk	"Kaathu Kedapadhu"	himself	
