= R. Sarathkumar filmography =

R. Sarathkumar
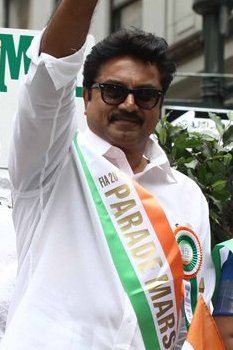
- Sarathkumar participating in the American Tamil Sangam Parade

R. Sarathkumar is an Indian actor and politician who works mainly in Tamil films. He has also worked in Telugu, Malayalam, Kannada and Hindi films.

== Film ==
Key
†	Denotes films that have not yet been released

=== Tamil ===
Year	Film	Role	Notes	Ref.
1988	Kan Simittum Neram	Inspector Sarath	Also producer	
1989	Sattathin Marupakkam	Kumar		
1990	Pulan Visaranai	R. K. Mahendran		
1990	Mr. Karthik	Rajendran		
1990	Salem Vishnu	Shiva		
1990	Jagathalaprathapan	Dileep		
1990	Pudhu Padagan	Aadhikesavan		
1990	Seetha	Rathnaraj		
1990	Sandhana Kaatru	Ramu		
1990	Mounam Sammadham	Balu		
1990	Velai Kidaichuduchu	Purushothaman		
1990	Puriyaadha Pudhir	Sarath		
1990	Engitta Mothathay	"Military" Kandan	Guest appearance	
1990	Palaivana Paravaigal	Mamu		
1990	Sirayil Sila Raagangal	Antony		
1990	Urudhi Mozhi	Legal Loganathan		
1990	Raja Kaiya Vacha	Vaidyaraj		
1991	Thangamana Thangachi	Vijay		
1991	Namma Ooru Mariamma	Rajadurai		
1991	Chithirai Pookkal	Johnson David		
1991	Vetri Padigal	Guruji		
1991	Pudhu Manithan	Sundar		
1991	Captain Prabhakaran	Rajaraman IFS		
1991	Kaaval Nilayam	Inspector Vijay		
1991	Idhaya Vaasal	Ganesh		
1991	Cheran Pandiyan	Rajapaandi Gounder		
1991	Archana IAS	Santhosh Kumar		
1991	Vaidehi Kalyanam	Rajamanickam		
1991	Vasanthakala Paravai	Rajesh		
1992	Ilavarasan	Vijay		
1992	Periya Gounder Ponnu	Thangamuthu		
1992	Sivantha Malar	Vijay		
1992	Oor Mariyadhai	Rathnavelu		
1992	Idhuthanda Sattam	SP Selvaraj IPS		
1992	Suriyan	Suriyan IPS		
1992	Ellaichami	Ellaichami		
1992	Samundi	Samundi		
1992	Thai Mozhi	Rajasimham		
1992	Natchathira Nayagan	Vijay		
1992	Meera	Police officer	Guest appearance	
1993	Aadhityan	Aadhityan		
1993	Dasarathan	ACP Dasarathan IPS		
1993	Vedan	Vijay IPS (Ranjith Kumar)		
1993	Munarivippu	Gopi		
1993	Band Master	Ravi		
1993	Moondravadhu Kann	Inspector Sarath		
1993	I Love India	Brigadier Diwakar		
1993	Kattabomman	Kattabomman		
1994	Aranmanai Kaavalan	Sakthi		
1994	Indhu	Kaasi	Guest appearance	
1994	Namma Annachi	Ayya, Annachi & Prabhakaran		
1994	Killadi Mappillai	Himself	Cameo appearance	
1994	Raja Pandi	Raja Pandi		
1994	Nattamai	Shanmugam (Nattamai) & Pasupathi		
1994	Magudikkaran	Raja's father	Guest appearance	
1995	Veluchami	Veluchami		
1995	Coolie	Karna		
1995	Nadodi Mannan	Ramu (Ram Sundar)		
1995	Ragasiya Police	ACP Suriya IPS		
1996	Mahaprabhu	Daamodaran		
1996	Nethaji	Nethaji		
1997	Aravindhan	Aravindhan		
1997	Surya Vamsam	Sakthivel Gounder & Chinnarasu		
1997	Janakiraman	Janakiraman		
1998	Moovendhar	Manimaran		
1998	Natpukaaga	Chinnaiya / Muthaiya		
1998	Simmarasi	Manickavasagam		
1998	Unnidathil Ennai Koduthen	Himself	Cameo appearance	
1999	Chinna Durai	Chinna Durai		
1999	Rajasthan	Hariharan	Partially reshot in Telugu	
1999	Oruvan	Surya		
1999	Poovellam Kettuppar	Himself	Cameo appearance	
1999	Pattali	Shanmugam		
2000	Pennin Manathai Thottu	Balaraman	Guest appearance	
2000	Maayi	Maayaandi (Maayi)		
2001	Ullam Kollai Poguthey	Himself	Cameo appearance	
2001	Rishi	Rishi, Velu		
2001	Vinnukkum Mannukkum	Sakthivel Gounder		
2001	Dosth	Vishwanath	Also dubbed for Prakash Raj in one scene	
2001	Samuthiram	Selvarasu		
2002	Thenkasi Pattanam	Kannan		
2002	Samasthanam	Thiru		
2003	Arasu	Thirunavukkarasu (Arasu), Periyavar		
2003	Paarai	Mabbu Marthandam		
2003	Diwan	Raghavan, Duraisingham		
2004	Gambeeram	ACP Muthusamy		
2004	Manasthan	Deivarasu		
2004	Chatrapathy	Major Chatrapathy (Saravanan)		
2004	Aai	Velu		
2005	Ayya	Ayyadurai, Chelladurai		
2005	Jithan	Tamizharasu IPS	Guest appearance	
2005	Chanakya	Ganesan		
2006	Thalaimagan	Dheeran	100th Film; also director	
2007	Pachaikili Muthucharam	Venkatesh		
2007	Mayakannadi	Himself	Cameo appearance	
2007	Nam Naadu	Muthazhagu		
2008	Vaitheeswaran	Saravanan, Bala		
2009	1977	Rajashekar, Vetrivel		
2010	Jaggubhai	Jagannathan		
2010	Kola Kolaya Mundhirika	Karan Muthaiah	Guest appearance	
2011	Kanchana	Kanchana (Karthik)		
2013	Chennaiyil Oru Naal	Sundara Pandian		
2014	Nimirndhu Nil	Saravana	Guest appearance	
2014	Kochadaiiyaan	Sengodagan		
2014	Nee Naan Nizhal	Anwar Ali		
2015	I	Himself	Cameo appearance	
2015	Sandamarutham	Sarveshvaran / Surya	125th Film; also screenwriter	
2017	Chennaiyil Oru Naal 2	Sundara Pandian		
2017	Adangathey	TBA	Unreleased	
2020	Vaanam Kottatum	Bose		
2022	Ponniyin Selvan: I	Periya Pazhuvettaraiyar		
2023	Varisu	Rajendran Palanisamy		
2023	Rudhran	Bhoominathan (Bhoomi)		
2023	Ponniyin Selvan: II	Periya Pazhuvettaraiyar		
2023	Custody	Nataraj	Bilingual film; Also shot in Telugu	
2023	Por Thozhil	Lokanathan		
2023	Paramporul	R. Maithreyan		
2024	Hit List	ACP K. Yazhvendhan		
2024	Mazhai Pidikkatha Manithan	Commander Chief		
2024	Nirangal Moondru	Inspector K. Selvam		
2024	The Smile Man	Chidambaram Nedumaaran	150th Film	
2025	Nesippaya	Adhinarayanan		
2025	Nilavuku En Mel Ennadi Kobam	Karunakaran		
2025	3BHK	Vasudevan		
2025	Dude	Athiyamaan Azhagappan		
2025	Kombuseevi	Rokkapuli		
2026	Aazhi	Moorthy		

=== Telugu ===
Year	Film	Role	Notes
1986	Samajamlo Sthree	Surendar Babu	
1990	Magaadu	SP Raju	
1990	Vishnu		
1990	Balachandrudu	Minor Babu	
1991	Stuartpuram Police Station	Veera Das	
1991	Gang Leader	Raghava	
1991	Surya IPS	Pruthvi Raj IPS	
1992	Agreement	Ram / Sathyaa Moorthy	Dual role
1994	Captain	Captain Shiva	Partially reshot in Tamil
2005	Bunny	Ranga Rao / Bhupathi Raja	Guest appearance
2012	Genius	Sarath Chandra	
2013	Chandee	Chandrasekhar Azad	
2015	Janda Pai Kapiraju	Sarath Chandra	Guest appearance
2017	Nenorakam	Sarath	
2017	Jaya Janaki Nayaka	Chakravarthy	
2018	Bharat Ane Nenu	Raghava Rao	
2018	Naa Peru Surya	Challa	
2018	Saakshyam	Raju Garu	Cameo appearance
2023	Custody	Nataraj	
2023	Rangabali	Ranga Reddy	Special appearance
2023	Bhagavanth Kesari	Srikanth	Guest appearance
2025	Arjun Son Of Vyjayanthi	Sarath Chandra	
2025	Kannappa	Nanthanathudu	

=== Malayalam ===
Year	Film	Role	Notes
2009	Pazhassi Raja	Edachena Kunkan	
2010	Oridathoru Postman	Yasin Mubarak	
2011	The Metro	C. I Jacob Alexander, Alexander	Dual role
2011	Christian Brothers	Andrews (Karim lala)	Cameo appearance
2011	Veeraputhran	Vimal Menon	
2012	Achante Aanmakkal	Narasimham IPS	
2014	Asha Black	Anwar Ali	
2023	Christopher	Vetrivel IPS	Cameo appearance
2023	Bandra	Veera Raghavan IPS	

=== Kannada ===
Year	Film	Role	Notes
2012	Saarathi	Suryanarayana	
2013	Myna	B. B. Ashok Kumar	
2016	Santheyalli Nintha Kabira	Sikandar Lodi	
2017	Raajakumara	Ashok	
2019	Seetharama Kalyana	Shankar	
2022	James	Joseph Antony	
2022	Raymo	Sri Deshpande	

=== Hindi ===
Year	Film	Role	Notes
2024	Sarfira	Nedumaran	
2026	Daadi Ki Shaadi	Col. Theeran Devarajan	

== As producer ==
Year	Title	Notes
1988	Kan Simittum Neram	
1990	Mr Karthik	
2005	Jithan	
2006	Thalaimagan	
2007	Kannamoochi Yenada	
2010	Jaggubhai	
2013	Chennaiyil Oru Naal	
2014	Pulivaal	
2015	Sandamarutham	
2015	Maari	
2015	Idhu Enna Maayam	

== As writer and director ==
Year	Title	Writer	Director
2006	Thalaimagan		Yes
2015	Sandamarutham	Yes	

== As singer ==
Year	Song	Film	Composer	Ref.
1995	"Manushangala"	Aranmanai Kaavalan	Deva	
2004	"Orunnu Onnu"	Aai	Srikanth Deva	
2005	"Tharuveeya Tharamattiya"	Chanakya	Srikanth Deva	
2006	"Nooru Nooru"	Thalaimagan	Srikanth Deva	
2014	"Mugam Parthen", "Muthamidhave Ennai"	Ilakkanam Illa Kaadhal	Williams-Naga	
2014	"Unnai Mattum"	Sandamarutham	James Vasanthan	

== Television ==
Year	Series	Role	Language	Network	Notes
2000	Kodeeswaran	Host	Tamil	Sun TV	
2014	Ninaithale Inikkum	Guest	Tamil	Vendhar TV	
2016	Vinnaithaandi Varuvaayaa	Producer	Tamil	Vijay TV	
2020	Kodeeswari	Contestant	Tamil	Colors Tamil	Along with Varalaxmi; Winner
2020	Natchathira Jodi	Guest	Tamil	Sun TV	Along with Radhika
2020	Madras Maamis	Host	Tamil	Radaan Mediaworks	
2021–present	Parampara	Nagendra Naidu	Telugu	Disney+ Hotstar	
2022	Big Boss	Special Host	Tamil	Star Vijay	
2022	Irai	Robert Vasudevan	Tamil	Aha Tamil	
2022	Vanakkam Tamizha	Guest	Tamil	Sun TV	
2024	Cheran's Journey	Ashok	Tamil	SonyLIV	
2024	Nayanthara: Beyond the Fairytale	Himself	Tamil	Netflix	
