= Karuppu Subbiah =

Indian actor

- Born: M. Subbiah; Tirumangalam; Madurai; Tamil Nadu
- Died: 2013
- Other names: Subbiah, Mottai Subbiah
- Occupation: Actor
- Years active: 1961–1997

Karuppu Subbiah was an Indian actor who acted in over 300 Tamil language films in comedy roles and minor roles. He was also known as 'Mottai' Subbiah. He is notable for his comedian roles along with actor Goundamani. He also acted in many of Sivaji Ganesan's films during the 1960s and 1970s in cameo and minor roles. He acted in several films in comedy roles in the 1980s and 1990s. His debut film was Indira En Selvam in 1962. He is well known for his character Jambalakidi Pamba in Jallikattu Kaalai.

== Filmography ==
This is a partial filmography. You can expand it.

=== 1960s ===
Year	Film	Role	Notes
1961	Kumudham	Periyasamy	Debut Movie / Credited as Subbiah
1962	Indira En Selvam		
1964	Pachai Vilakku	Karim	
1965	Pazhani		
1965	Anbu Karangal		
1966	Mahakavi Kalidas	Poet	
1969	Anbalippu	Thangam	

=== 1970s ===
Year	Film	Role	Notes
1970	Vietnam Veedu	Housekeeper	Credited as Subbiah
1970	Anadhai Anandhan		
1970	Raman Ethanai Ramanadi		
1970	Sorgam		
1970	Engal Thangam		
1971	Mohammed Bin Tughlaq		
1972	Itho Enthan Deivam		
1972	Jakkamma	Nattamai	Credited as 'Mottai' Subbiah
1973	Sontham		
1974	Avaḷukku Nikar Avaḷe		
1974	Dheerga Sumangali		
1974	Thaai		
1976	Satyam		
1976	Etharkum Thuninthavan		Credited as 'Mottai' Subbiah
1979	Rosappu Ravikkaikari		
1979	Chakkalathi		

=== 1980s ===
Year	Film	Role	Notes
1980	Vandichakkaram		
1980	Ilamai Kolam		
1980	Doorathu Idi Muzhakkam		
1982	Ayiram Muthangal		
1983	Imaigal		Credited as 'Mottai' Subbiah
1983	Saranalayam		
1985	Aagaya Thamaraigal		
1985	Geethanjali	Horse Owner	
1986	Kanna Thorakkanum Saami		
1986	Karimedu Karuvayan	Constable	
1986	Oru Iniya Udayam		
1986	Rasigan Oru Rasigai		
1986	Maragatha Veenai		
1987	Ninaive Oru Sangeetham		
1987	Anbulla Appa		
1987	Kudumbam Oru Koyil		
1987	Uzhavan Magan		
1987	Mannukkul Vairam		
1988	Senthoora Poove		
1988	Nethiyadi	Karuppu	
1989	Enne Petha Raasa		
1989	Ponmana Selvan		
1989	Poruthathu Pothum		
1989	Thangamana Raasa		

=== 1990s ===
Year	Film	Role	Notes
1990	Puthu Paatu		
1990	Namma Ooru Poovatha		
1990	Salem Vishnu		
1991	Naadu Adhai Naadu		
1991	Oorellam Un Paattu		
1991	Marikozhundhu		
1991	Manasara Vazhthungalen		
1992	Pattathu Raani	Rickshaw Driver	
1992	Abhirami		
1992	Solaiyamma	Marimuthu	
1992	Periya Gounder Ponnu		
1992	Magudam	Alagumani's Uncle	
1992	Natchathira Nayagan		
1992	Villu Pattukaran		
1993	Moondravadhu Kann		
1993	Rakkayi Koyil		
1993	Rajadurai		
1993	Maravan		
1993	Ulle Veliye		
1993	Kattabomman		
1994	Varavu Ettana Selavu Pathana		
1994	Pudhiya Mannargal		
1994	Vaanga Partner Vaanga		
1994	Sindhu Nathi Poo		
1994	Mani Rathnam		
1994	Jallikattu Kaalai	Jambalakidi Pamba	
1994	Periya Marudhu		
1995	Neela Kuyil		
1995	En Pondatti Nallava		
1995	Raja Enga Raja		
1995	Thamizhachi		
1995	Varraar Sandiyar		
1995	Murai Mappillai		
1996	Aruva Velu		
1996	Coimbatore Mappillai		
1996	Ullathai Allitha		
1996	Katta Panchayathu		
1996	Vishwanath		
1996	Pudhu Nilavu		
1996	Avathara Purushan		
1996	Thirumbi Paar		
1997	Thaali Pudhusu		
1997	Samrat		
1997	Themmangu Paattukaaran		
