= Suryakanth =

Indian Actor

- Born: Pakkiri; 7 July 1960 (age 66); Poondi, Thanjavur district, Tamil Nadu, India
- Occupations: Film Actor, Television Actor
- Years active: 1981–present
- Notable work: Indru Poi Naalai Vaa; Thooral Ninnu Pochchu; Mann Vasanai; Kizhakku Cheemayile

Suryakanth (born 7 July 1960) is a Tamil film actor known for his works predominantly in Tamil films. He has acted more than 300 films, including as a villain, and a comedian. Suriyakanth has acted in many films, such as Indru Poi Naalai Vaa, Thooral Ninnu pochu, Mann Vasanai, Kizhakku Cheemayile. He made his debut film M. A. Kaja's Vasantha Kaalam released in 1981.

== Early life ==
Suryakanth's birth name was Pakkiri. He was born in Poondi, Thanjavur district, Tamil Nadu. While studying in the fifth grade, the song footage of a film starring "Kuladeivam" Rajagopal was taken in the Poondi Dam area, which aroused his interest in acting in films. After discontinuing his BA degree, Suryakanth was rechristened by Sandow M. M. A. Chinnappa Thevar to act in films.

== Film career ==
Initially, he struggled to get an offer in high-profile films, but director K. Bhagyaraj gave Suryakanth a big opportunity to act in Thooral Ninnu Pochchu (1982), where he portrayed a silent villain. His performance in the film was critically praised by the critics and audience. Thereafter, Bhagyaraj constantly gave opportunities for Suryakanth in various roles in his films, establishing him into Tamil cinema.

== Filmography ==
This is a partial filmography. You can expand it.

=== 1980s ===
Year	Film	Role	Notes
1981	Vasantha Kaalam	Bharathi	
1981	Indru Poi Naalai Vaa	Rowdy	
1982	Thooral Ninnu Pochchu	Ayyavu	
1984	Kudumbam		
1985	Pudhu Yugam	Bharathi	
1985	Puthiya Theerppu		
1985	Naan Sigappu Manithan	Mohanraj's henchman	
1986	Kanna Thorakkanum Saami		
1986	Rasigan Oru Rasigai		
1986	Amman Kovil Kizhakale		
1986	Mannukkul Vairam		
1986	Enakku Nane Needipathi		
1986	Engal Thaikulame Varuga		
1988	Idhu Namma Aalu		
1988	Raasave Unnai Nambi		
1989	Rajanadai		
1989	En Rathathin Rathame		

=== 1990s ===
Year	Film	Role	Notes
1990	Paalam	Muthu	
1990	Engal Swamy Ayyappan		
1990	Namma Ooru Poovatha		
1991	Thaiyalkaran		
1992	Rasukutty	Sengodan	
1992	Onna Irukka Kathukanum		
1992	Idhuthanda Sattam		
1993	Thalattu		
1993	Kizhakku Cheemayile	Periya Karuppu	
1994	Seevalaperi Pandi	Karuppaiah	
1994	Thamarai		
1994	Jai Hind		
1994	Varavu Ettana Selavu Pathana	Marugupaandi's sidekick	
1994	Jallikattu Kaalai		
1995	Thamizhachi		
1995	Marumagan	Sengaliappan	
1995	Nadodi Mannan		
1995	Gandhi Pirantha Mann		
1995	Maa Manithan		
1996	Meendum Savithri		
1996	Musthaffaa		
1997	Kadavul		
1998	Moovendhar		
1998	Urimai Por		
1998	Ellame En Pondattithaan		
1999	Mudhal Etcharikkai		
1999	Viralukketha Veekkam	Peon	
1999	Sundari Neeyum Sundaran Naanum		

=== 2000s ===
Year	Film	Role	Notes
2000	Kadhal Rojavae		
2000	Koodi Vazhnthal Kodi Nanmai	Opposition party member	
2000	Maayi	Raasu	
2000	En Sakhiye		
2001	Thaalikaatha Kaaliamman		
2001	Kunguma Pottu Gounder		
2002	Padai Veetu Amman		
2003	Diwan		
2003	Boys	"Pimp" Manickam	
2003	Soori	Dhobi	
2004	En Purushan Ethir Veetu Ponnu		
2005	Rightaa Thappaa		
2005	Anniyan	Line man Kandhasamy / Drunkard in Train	Uncredited role
2007	Onbadhu Roobai Nottu		
2008	Kasimedu Govindan	Fisherman	

=== 2010s ===
Year	Film	Role	Notes
2010	Singam		
2011	Gurusamy		
2013	Varuthapadatha Valibar Sangam		
2015	Kaaki Sattai		
2018	Kaala	MLA Candidate	
2018	Vada Chennai	Padma's father	
2019	Kaithi		
2019	Sangathamizhan	Moorthy	
2019	Irandam Ulagaporin Kadaisi Gundu		
2020	Porwaale	Shop owner	Short film

== Television ==
- Chinna Thambi
- Kana Kaanum Kaalangal
