= Jallikattu (disambiguation) =

Jallikattu is a traditional Indian bullfighting sport from the state of Tamil Nadu.

Jallikattu may also refer to:

- Jallikattu (1987 film), a 1987 Indian Tamil film
- Jallikattu Kaalai, a 1994 Indian Tamil film
- Jallikattu (2019 film), a 2019 Indian Malayalam film
