= Thideer Kannaiah =

Indian Actor

- Born: Kannaiah; 1936
- Died: 17 November 2013 (77)
- Occupations: Actor, Stage Actor
- Years active: 1972–2008
- Spouse: Rajeshwari
- Children: 2

Thideer Kannaiah was an Indian film and stage actor. He has acted in more than 500 films. His debut film was Aval Oru Thodarkathai. He is notable for his comedian roles along with actors Goundamani and Vadivelu. While he was in the drama, he appeared mostly in the breakthrough scenes. Therefore, he was called as "Thideer" Kannaiah.

== Early life ==
Kanniah, who is native to Chennai, has worked in various drama troupes since childhood. he made his debut in the industry with the film aval oru thodarkathai (1974). While working at the chennai perambur railway coach factory, he started acting in films.

== Film career ==
Director K. Balachandar, he made his acting debut in the Tamil film industry. He acted as the bus conductor. He has acted in more than 500 films Apoorva Ragangal, Karotti Kannan, Priya, Vellai Roja, Yettikki Potti, Apoorva Sagodharargal, Enna Petha Rasa and Pokkiri.

== Family ==
Kannaya has a wife Rajeshwari, a son Ramesh and a daughter Chitra, Grand Son Sathish and Grand Daughter Preetha, Vanitha, Pooja

== Death ==
He died of heart attack on November 17, 2013 at the age of 77.

== Filmography ==
This is a partial filmography. You can expand it.

Year	Film	Role	Notes
1972	Itho Enthan Deivam		Uncredited roles
1972	Annai Abirami	Poosari	Uncredited roles
1974	Aval Oru Thodar Kathai	Bus conductor	
1974	Thaai Piranthal		
1975	Apoorva Raagangal	Mahendran's friend	
1975	Karotti Kannan		
1977	Nallathukku Kalamillai		
1978	Priya	Vasanth	Tamil-Kannada bilingual film
1979	Chakkalathi		
1980	Thunaivi Thozhan		
1982	Pattanathu Rajakkal		
1983	Vellai Roja		
1983	Samayapurathale Satchi		
1985	Kadivalam		
1985	Neethiyin Marupakkam		
1985	Yaar?		
1986	Iravu Pookkal		
1986	Koottu Puzhukkal		
1986	Manakanakku		
1987	Yettikki Potti		
1988	Oorai Therinjikitten		
1988	Nethiyadi	Konnayan	
1989	Apoorva Sagodharargal		
1989	Enna Petha Rasa		
1989	Mananthal Mahadevan		
1989	Manasukketha Maharasa		
1990	Namma Ooru Poovatha		
1990	Puthu Paatu		
1991	Idhaya Vaasal		
1991	Archana IAS		
1991	Pondatti Sonna Kettukanum	Police constable	
1991	Thanthu Vitten Ennai	Pedestrian	
1991	Vanakkam Vathiyare		
1991	Putham Pudhu Payanam		
1991	Vaidehi Kalyanam		
1992	Periya Gounder Ponnu		
1992	Ellaichami		
1992	Pattathu Raani		
1992	Samundi		
1993	Porandhalum Ambalaiya Porakka Koodaadhu		
1993	Moondravadhu Kann		
1993	Ulle Veliye		
1993	Porantha Veeda Puguntha Veeda	Veera	
1993	Madurai Meenakshi		
1993	Amma Ponnu		
1993	Nallathe Nadakkum		
1993	Maravan		
1994	Sevatha Ponnu		
1994	Aranmanai Kaavalan		
1994	Nila		
1994	Killadi Mappillai		
1994	Thamarai		
1994	Subramaniya Swamy		
1995	Naan Petha Magane	Nair	
1995	Mannai Thottu Kumbidanum	Mannar	
1995	Dear Son Maruthu		
1995	En Pondatti Nallava		
1996	Vaanmathi		
1996	Purushan Pondatti		
1996	Mappillai Manasu Poopola		
1996	Veettukulle Thiruvizha		
1996	Minor Mappillai		
1996	Vishwanath		
1996	Summa Irunga Machan		
1996	Priyamudan		
1997	Nesam Pudhusu		
1997	Vasuke		
1997	Pudhalvan		
1998	Santhosham		
1998	Senthooram		
1998	Kannathal	Gopal	
1999	Jayam		
1999	Kudumba Sangili		
2000	Ninaivellam Nee		
2001	Rishi	Astrologer	
2002	Game		
2004	Arivumani	Police Officer	
2006	Kai Vandha Kalai		
2007	Pokkiri	Reporter	
2007	Ennai Paar Yogam Varum		
2007	Piragu		
2008	Ini Varum Kaalam		
2016	Ilamai Oonjal		Last film
