= Chakkalathi =

- Poster
- Directed by: Devaraj–Mohan
- Written by: Alagapuri Alagappan
- Produced by: S. Nachammal
- Starring: Sudhakar; Shoba; Ambika; Vijayan
- Cinematography: R. N. K. Prasath
- Edited by: M. Vellaisamy; M. Kesavan
- Music by: Ilaiyaraaja
- Production company: Subburaja Combines
- Release date: 7 December 1979
- Running time: 107 minutes
- Country: India
- Language: Tamil

Chakkalathi (transl. Mistress) is a 1979 Indian Tamil-language drama film directed by Devaraj–Mohan and written Alagapuri Alagappan. The film stars Sudhakar, Shoba, Ambika and Vijayan. It was the debut of Ambika, who later became one of Tamil cinema's biggest stars in the 1980s. The film was released on 7 December 1979.

== Cast ==
- Sudhakar as Samikannu
- Shoba as Panchali
- Ambika as Azhagammai
- Vijayan as Veerappan
- Y. Vijaya
- Karuppu Subbiah
- Thideer Kannaiah
- Vijayachandrika
- Thayir Vadai Desikan

Guest appearances

- Sarath Babu
- Saritha

== Soundtrack ==
The music was composed by Ilaiyaraaja. The song "Enna Paattu" is set to Mayamalavagowla raga.

Title	Singer(s)	Lyrics	Length
"Enna Paattu"	Ilaiyaraaja	Pulamaipithan	4:35
"Vaadai Vaattuthu"	Ilaiyaraaja	Pulamaipithan	4:10
"Kozhi Mootta Kozhi"	S. P. Sailaja, B. S. Sasirekha	Muthulingam	4:02
"Chinna Chinna Paathi Katti"	S. Janaki	Pulamaipithan	3:21

== Critical reception ==
Kousigan of Kalki appreciated Prasath's cinematography and Ilaiyaraaja's music, but criticised Devaraj–Mohan's direction.
