= Nethiyadi =

- DVD cover
- Directed by: Pandiarajan
- Written by: Pandiarajan
- Produced by: Avinashimani
- Starring: Pandiarajan; Vaishnavi
- Cinematography: Ashok Kumar
- Edited by: V. Rajagopal
- Music by: Pandiarajan
- Production company: Avinash Arts
- Release date: 28 April 1989
- Running time: 134 minutes
- Country: India
- Language: Tamil

Nethiyadi (transl. Bullseye) is a 1989 Indian Tamil-language comedy film written, directed and scored by Pandiarajan. The film stars him and Vaishnavi, with Janagaraj, Senthil, and Shanmugasundari in supporting roles. It was released on 28 April 1989.

== Plot ==
Venu is a carefree youth in his village. Though he is jobless, occasionally he supports his father Mysore Manickam a renowned cook as assistant to his father. They take care of cooking in marriage and other ceremonies. On occasion of one the local old lady's funeral where many people are gathered in venu's home, he comes across his distant relative Banu and falls in love with her. Though initially reluctant, after venu's suicide attempt, Banu also starts loving Venu. Banu's father is a money minded person who is also the owner of a quarry and owns some land. He strictly tell's that the prospective groom of banu should run some own business and be wealthy enough. on hearing this venu decides a start a low budget military hotel. with help of palakatchi pachaiyappan who actually is a conman, Venu starts the hotel and calls Banu's father for inaugurating. Things are going well, however government issues notice to venu's hotel for building in govt. area. Venu initially is ignorant of the orders and after 5 to 6 notice, government orders the police to eradicate venu's shop.

Venu is shattered by this news and banu's father who initially agreed for Venu's marriage with banu suddenly calls off the marriage citing that venu and his family are paupers now. in a rage, venu decides to elope with Banu however he is stopped by banu father's henchmen. venu starts running in a chase but is suddenly hit by a car which is driven by Amala. Amala is daughter of the city's collector. Though they are rich amala's father doesn't approve her love with a local peon citing status issues. fed up by this, amala decides to end her life by writing a letter to her dad and eloping from home. But on the way, her car hits venu and venu is hospitalized. Amala and her father helps venu recover

Amala's father now approves amala's love with that peon and is very grateful for venu for saving his daughter's life. If he had not come across amala's car, amala would have ended her life by now. Venu and amala share their past with each other. on hearing venu's current situation, Amala decides to help venu. she sets up a drama where venu suddenly becomes rich and returns home with a car. whole village including banu's father are astonished. Banu mistakes amala to be venu's fiancé. Venu is inaugurating a five star hotel with amala as the guest. Banu's father now wants banu to get married with venu as he is rich now. But venu and his father reject banu father's proposal citing banu father is too low for their new status now. Banu's father who is already dejected gets more shock when he learns that now his lands will be seized by government for a very meagre compensation. he learns that venu is reason behind this. his idea of letting banu marry someone else of his choice is shattered by this as now the groom's family won't accept this as banu father is going to become pauper now. Banu's father is angered by this and decides to kiii venu at first. later his henchmen suggest him to kill amala instead so that venu will not get any property. in the meanwhile venu meets banu and confesses his love for her stating that amala was in love with some other person and not venu. Banu on hearing her father's plan to kill venu (banu did not hear the full plan). she rushes to amala's home to inform her, amala asks banu to stay in her home and leaves immediately to alert venu. Later venu and amala confronts banu's father. Banu's father realizes his mistake. Also he realizes that his henchmen have inadvertently kidnapped banu instead of amala as banu was in amala's place as it was dark while they kidnapped.

Later venu rushes to the quary where one deaf henchman of Banu's father is to kill banu thinking as amala. That deaf henchman is blasting rocks and trying to kill that girl in that blast. Banu's father also arrives to the quarry and shouts at the deaf henchman to stop immediately. But that deaf henchman mistakes that banu's father is ordering him to kill that girl fast. Venu decides to risk his life amidst the blast and he fights with deaf henchman overpowers him and saves banu, After the fight that deaf henchman also regains his hearing powers.

Finally Venu marries Banu with banu's father now serving as assistant for venu's father

== Cast ==
- Pandiarajan as Venu
- Vaishnavi as Banu
- Janagaraj as Mysore Manikam
- Senthil as Palakatchi Pachaippan
- Karuppu Subbiah as Karuppu
- Thideer Kannaiah as Kona Chithappa
- Shanmugasundari as Venu grandmother
- Vijayachandrika as Banu's mother
- King Kong as Venu's friend
- Master Haja Sheriff as Tailor
- Tiruppur Ramasamy as a villager

Guest appearances

- Amala as Amala
- Kuyili
- S. J. Surya as a villager (uncredited)

== Soundtrack ==
The film's soundtrack was composed by Pandiarajan making his debut as composer and remained his only film as composer. All songs were written by Vaali, Vairamuthu, Pulavar Mari, Rajaraja Chozhan, Satta Muthan.

Title	Singer(s)	Duration
Pattu Eduthu Padurean (Title Song)	Malaysia Vasudevan and Chorus	2:21
Naan Unakku Paattu Onnu	P. Jayachandran, S. P. Sailaja	3:44
Pocketla Paathu Kasu	S. P. Balasubrahmanyam and Chorus	4:24
Vizhalil Oru Kadhal	P. Susheela	2:34
Aattatha Paathuttu Kaithattu	Mano, S. Janaki	4:04
Kookkuvena Koovum	S. P. Balasubrahmanyam, K. S. Chithra	4:05

== Reception ==
P. S. S. of Kalki praised the film for humour.
