= Amma Ponnu =

- Poster
- Directed by: Arun
- Written by: Arun
- Produced by: Kovai M. Murugesan
- Starring: Vignesh; Akhila
- Cinematography: S. Saravanan
- Edited by: M. Ganesan
- Music by: Songs: Ekandhan; Film score: Siva
- Production company: Anand Cine Arts
- Release date: 9 April 1993
- Running time: 145 minutes
- Country: India
- Language: Tamil

Amma Ponnu (transl. Mother's daughter) is a 1993 Indian Tamil-language romantic drama film directed by Arun. The film stars Vignesh and newcomer Akhila, with Nagesh, K. R. Vijaya, Goundamani, Senthil, Ponvannan and Nandagopal playing supporting roles. It was released on 9 April 1993.

== Plot ==
The film starts with a young man Anand making a mess in a women's college. The police then arrest him. At the police station, Anand explains the reason behind the chaos he caused in the college.

In the past, Anand was from a very poor family and his father left him in a Christian school at a very young age. His father wanted him to become a district collector and Anand took the promise that the next time he will meet his father he will be a district collector. The years went by and Anand became a good student, his best friend is the loafer Jana. One day, in a drunken state, Anand broke the car window of the college correspondent. The college principal suspended him for a day and asked Anand to earn ten rupees that day. The next day, Anand became a horse rider at the beach but things did not work out as well as he hoped. The college student Bharani, who rid the horse, did not have money to pay Anand so Bharani's friends call the police. The police then arrested the innocent Anand for attempting to rape the woman. He was later released and the college principal definitely excluded Anand from the college. Thereafter, Anand went to Bharani's college and made a mess.

After hearing his tragic past, the police inspector has sympathy for Anand, so he releases him and gives him a job in Bharani's village. Anand and his friend Jana then move into a house in Bharani's village. Anand, who wants to seek revenge on Bharani, asks for justice at Bharani's house. Bharani apologises to him and implores to not take revenge on her. Bharani lives a precarious life with her widow mother, her father was a politician and died when she was young. Later on, Anand and Bharani fall in love with each other. But Bharani's mother finds a rich NRI groom for her daughter. What transpires later forms the crux of the story.

== Cast ==
- Vignesh as Anand
- Akhila as Bharani
- Nagesh as Vathiyar
- K. R. Vijaya as Bharani's mother
- Goundamani
- Senthil as Nallathambi
- Ponvannan as Police inspector
- Nandagopal as Jana
- Chokkalinga Bhagavathar
- Manikkaraj
- Neelu as College principal
- Thideer Kannaiah as Anand's father
- S. N. Lakshmi
- Pillaiyar Mani
- Theni Kunjarammal as Nallathambi's mother

== Soundtrack ==
The soundtrack was composed by Ekandhan, with lyrics written by Pulamaipithan, Muthulingam, Kalidasan and Kadhalmathi.

Song	Singer(s)	Duration
"Chithira Poovizhi"	S. P. Balasubrahmanyam, Chorus	5:23
"Enthan Kadhal"	S. P. Balasubrahmanyam, Minmini	4:55
"Izhayavane"	K. J. Yesudas	5:06
"Soorithiyoda"	S. P. Balasubrahmanyam, E. V. Chandran	5:09
"Vanamenna"	Mano, Lalitha, Chorus	4:32

== Reception ==
Malini Mannath of The Indian Express gave the film a negative review, criticising the script and the narration. R. P. R. of Kalki criticised the director for moving the plot aimlessly.
