= Mappillai Gounder =

- Poster
- Directed by: Manivasagam
- Screenplay by: Manivasagam
- Story by: Arunmaaran
- Produced by: Rajeswari Manivasagam
- Starring: Prabhu; Sakshi Shivanand; Swathi
- Cinematography: Jayanan Vincent
- Edited by: P. Mohanraj
- Music by: Deva
- Production company: Raja Pushpa Pictures
- Release date: 28 February 1997
- Running time: 141 min
- Country: India
- Language: Tamil

Mappillai Gounder (transl. Gounder, the groom) is a 1997 Indian Tamil-language romantic drama film written and directed by Manivasagam. The film stars Prabhu and Sakshi Shivanand, while Swathi plays a supporting role. The film, which has music composed by Deva, was released on 28 February 1997.

== Plot ==
Subramani aka Mappillai Gounder (Prabhu) is the son of a rich landlord (Vinu Chakravarthy) living in a village. Subramani dreams of marrying his niece Priya (Sakshi Shivanand) who lives in the US. Upon her return neither Priya nor her father (Nizhalgal Ravi) are interested in the wedding proposal with Subramani and this deteriorates Subramani's father's health. While Priya's father is on a business trip to Singapore, Subramani meets Priya in Chennai and convinces her to come to his village and stay for a few days with the hope of his father's health to improve. Priya does not like the village lifestyle initially, however she understands the good nature of Subramani and gradually falls for him. Meanwhile, there is Amsavalli (Swathi) who works at Subramani's home and she also falls in love with Subramani but does not express her feelings knowing Subramani's love for Priya but Subramani understands Amsavalli's feelings. Priya's father comes back from Singapore and gets furious knowing that Priya is with Subramani in his village and goes immediately to bring her back. Priya confesses her love for Subramani to her father and beyond a point, her father agrees for their wedding. Priya returns to the village but is shocked to see the wedding happening between Subramani and Amsavalli. Subramani says that village lifestyle will not suit Priya and convinces her to marry an educated guy as per her match. Finally Subramani and Amsavalli are united.

== Cast ==
- Prabhu as Subramani aka Mapillai Gounder
- Sakshi Shivanand as Priya
- Swathi as Amsavalli
- Vadivelu as Muthan
- Vinu Chakravarthy
- Nizhalgal Ravi
- Master Mahendran as Young Subramani
- Sabitha Anand as Shenbagam
- Manivannan

== Production ==
Thambi Ramaiah made his debut as an assistant director with the venture, assisting Manivasagam who had earlier made Nadodi Mannan (1995).

== Soundtrack ==
Soundtrack was composed by Deva.

Song	Singers	Lyrics	Length (m:ss)
"Aiyira Meenu"	Swarnalatha, Mano	Kalidasan	04:02
"Madhuraina Madhuraithan"	K. S. Chithra, Mano	Kamakodiyan	05:07
"Neela Vaanam"	Krishnaraj	Vetri Kondan	04:57
"Pattikaattu Life"	Anuradha Sriram, Mano	Ponniyin Selvan	05:12
"Thirumalai Nayagane"	Sumangali, S. P. Balasubrahmanyam	Ponniyin Selvan	05:51
