= Manivasagam =

Indian filmmaker (died 2001)

- Occupation: Director
- Years active: 1990–1997

Manivasagam (died 2001) was an Indian film director, producer and screenwriter who worked mainly in Tamil cinema.

== Career ==
Manivasagam began his career with Namma Ooru Poovatha (1990) and continued to work on village action dramas, often collaborating with actor Sarath Kumar. He often produced his own films, and credited his wife, Rajeswari Manivasagam, as the chief producer. The failure of his film, Nadodi Mannan (1995), prompted the director to take a break from directing films. His final release was Mappillai Gounder (1997) which also opened to negative reviews and performed poorly at the box office. Manivasagam died in 2001.

== Personal life ==
His son Gandhi made his directorial debut with Kalavani Mappillai starring Attakathi Dinesh.

== Filmography ==
Director & Producer

Year	Film	Notes
1990	Namma Ooru Poovatha	
1991	Vaidehi Kalyanam	
1992	Periya Gounder Ponnu	
1992	Pattathu Raani	
1993	Rakkayi Koyil	
1993	Kattabomman	
1994	Jallikattu Kaalai	Director
1995	Marumagan	Director
1995	Nadodi Mannan	
1997	Mappillai Gounder	

Producer

- Pattukottai Periyappa (1994)
