= Manasukketha Maharasa =

- Poster
- Directed by: Dheenadhayaal
- Screenplay by: Dheenadhayaal
- Story by: Karunanidhi Santharam
- Produced by: A. R. Santhilal Nahar; S. Gowri Gurukkal
- Starring: Ramarajan; Seetha
- Cinematography: P. Ganesapandiyan
- Edited by: S. Saravanakumar
- Music by: Deva
- Production company: Erusaaramman Movies
- Release date: 1 December 1989
- Country: India
- Language: Tamil

Manasukketha Maharasa (transl. The heart desired King) is a 1989 Indian Tamil-language film, directed by Dheenadhayaal who wrote the screenplay from a story by Agathiyan, credited as Karunanidhi Santharam onscreen. The film stars Ramarajan, Seetha, Nizhalgal Ravi and Goundamani. It was released on 1 December 1989.

== Plot ==
Raja, an unemployed graduate, moves to a neighboring village in search of a job after being insulted by his uncle, who threatens to evict his mother. There, he falls for Thenmozhi. Her uncle creates problems for them, and the rest of the film follows how Raja overcomes these obstacles and succeeds in his love.

== Cast ==
- Ramarajan
- Seetha
- Nizhalgal Ravi
- Goundamani
- Vinu Chakravarthy
- Senthil
- Madhuri
- Chinni Jayanth
- Peeli Sivam
- Thideer Kannaiah
- Master Haja Sheriff
- Seethalakshmi
- Joker Thulasi
- Girish
- Azhagu
- K. K. Sami
- Senchi Krishnan
- Thirai Needhi Selvam
- N. Pallavan

== Soundtrack ==
The music was composed by Deva and the lyrics written by Pulamaipithan and Kalidasan under the pen name "Thirupathooran". Even though Deva had made his debut in film music composition with Mattukara Mannaru (1986), it was this film which gave him a break as a composer.

Song	Singers	Lyrics
"Aathu Mettu Thopukulle"	P. Susheela, S. P. Balasubrahmanyam	Kalidasan
"Aarengum"	S. Janaki, Mano	Kalidasan
"Manjakulikira"	Uma Ramanan	Kalidasan
"Mugamoru Nila"	S. P. Balasubrahmanyam, K. S. Chithra	Kalidasan
"Nalla Nalla Pillaigale"	Malaysia Vasudevan	Pulamaipithan
"Vaanathula Parakkudu"	Malaysia Vasudevan	Kalidasan

== Reception ==
P. S. S. of Kalki praised the acting of Seetha and her banter with Ramarajan while also praising the acting of Nizhalgal Ravi and Deva's music. He however felt Goundamani as antagonist is made to fool around ruining the seriousness of his negative role.
