= Veettukulle Thiruvizha =

- Directed by: K. R. S. Jawahar
- Written by: D. Dinakar (dialogues)
- Screenplay by: K. R. S. Jawahar
- Story by: P. V. Ravi
- Produced by: Sankar
- Starring: Anand Babu; Sanghavi; Rohini; Vinodhini
- Cinematography: M. Kesavan; S. A. N. Gobi
- Edited by: K. R. Ramalingam
- Music by: Deva
- Production company: Sundar Art Film International
- Release date: 30 December 1996
- Running time: 125 minutes
- Country: India
- Language: Tamil

Veettukulle Thiruvizha (transl. Festival inside the house) is a 1996 Indian Tamil language romantic comedy film directed by K. R. S. Jawahar. The film stars Anand Babu, Sanghavi, Rohini and Vinodhini, with R. Sundarrajan, Vadivukkarasi, Vijaya Chandrika, Jai Ganesh, Kumarimuthu, K. K. Soundar and Pandu playing supporting roles. It was released on 30 December 1996.

== Plot ==
Muthuvel is the son of Ramasamy and Parvathi. Ramasamy wants his son to marry his niece Abhirami while Parvathi wants him to marry her niece Krishnaveni. After finishing his studies in the city, Muthuvel returns to his home. Abhirami with her parents and Krishnaveni with her parents enter his home to seduce him. One day, Muthuvel's college lover Gayathri comes to his home and she hugs him thus shocking his family.

Muthuvel and Gayathri are in love and they want to get married at any cost. Abhirami and Krishnaveni who were fighting for Muthuvel all along join hands against Gayathri. In the meantime, Muthuvel's little sister becomes pregnant and she reveals that the father is her collegemate Kumaresan. Gounder, Kumaresan's father, is not willing to give his son in marriage but later, he accepts if Muthuvel is ready to marry his daughter Lakshmi. Gayathri then sacrifices her love by orchestrating a fake drama portraying her as a bad person. Meanwhile, Abhirami's parents and Krishnaveni parents don't want their daughter to marry anymore Muthuvel and they all leave his house. When Muthuvel learns about the fake drama, he embarks on a search for his lover. The film ends with Muthuvel and Gayathri embracing.

== Cast ==
- Anand Babu as Muthuvel
- Sanghavi as Abhirami
- Rohini as Gayathri
- Vinodhini as Krishnaveni
- R. Sundarrajan as Ramasamy
- Vadivukkarasi as Parvathi
- Vijaya Chandrika as Rasathi
- Jai Ganesh as Kathavarayan
- Kumarimuthu as Rajasekhar
- K. K. Soundar as Gounder
- Pandu as Meganathan
- Rajkanth
- Sheela
- Ramya
- Jayadevi
- Idichapuli Selvaraj as Tirumangalam
- Vishnu
- Veeramani
- Thideer Kannaiah as Kannaiah
- Kovai Senthil as Marriage broker
- Tharani
- Anuja in a special appearance

== Soundtrack ==
The music was composed by Deva.

Track listing
No.	Title	Lyrics	Singer(s)	Length
1.	"Athai Sutta"	Vaali	Swarnalatha, Krishnaraj	4:28
2.	"Rasa Unne Ravikkayin"	Vaali	Swarnalatha, Sunandha, Krishnaraj	4:44
3.	"Pachaikallu Mookkuthi"	Vaali	Malaysia Vasudevan, Sunandha	5:06
4.	"Dheivanai Anbu"	Ponniyin Selvan	Swarnalatha	4:54
5.	"Oothukottai"	Vaali	Mano, K. S. Chithra	4:50
Total length:				24:02
