= Poondi, Thanjavur =

Poondi
- Village
- Location in Tamil Nadu, India Poondi (India)
- Coordinates: 10.772677°N 79.243339°E
- Country: India
- State: Tamil Nadu
- District: Thanjavur
- Taluk: Papanasam
- PIN Code: 613502
- Elevation: 34 m (112 ft)

Population (2011)
  - Total: 2,320

Languages
  - Official: Tamil
- Time zone: UTC+5:30 (IST)
- Postal code: 613502
- Vehicle registration: TN-49

Poondi is a village located in Papanasam Taluk, Thanjavur District, Tamil Nadu, India. It is located at 14 km towards east from District headquarters Thanjavur, 4 km from Ammapettai and 322 km from state capital Chennai on the Thanjavur-Nagapattinam highway.

== Geography ==
Poondi is situated on the banks of Vennaaru river. Poondi is located at a distance of 14 km towards East of Thanjavur and 48 km towards West of Thiruvarur. The village has a highly fertile wet land for agriculture.

== Climate ==
Climate data for Poondi
Month	Jan	Feb	Mar	Apr	May	Jun	Jul	Aug	Sep	Oct	Nov	Dec	Year
Mean daily maximum °C (°F)	29.0 (84.2)	32.0 (89.6)	35.0 (95.0)	38.0 (100.4)	39.0 (102.2)	37.0 (98.6)	37.0 (98.6)	36.0 (96.8)	35.0 (95.0)	33.0 (91.4)	30.0 (86.0)	29.0 (84.2)	410 (770)
Mean daily minimum °C (°F)	21.0 (69.8)	21.0 (69.8)	23.0 (73.4)	27.0 (80.6)	28.0 (82.4)	28.0 (82.4)	27.0 (80.6)	26.0 (78.8)	26.0 (78.8)	25.0 (77.0)	23.0 (73.4)	22.0 (71.6)	297 (567)
Average precipitation mm (inches)	8.0 (0.31)	8.0 (0.31)	16.0 (0.63)	25.0 (0.98)	35.0 (1.38)	25.0 (0.98)	29.0 (1.14)	65.0 (2.56)	52.0 (2.05)	99.0 (3.90)	93.0 (3.66)	62.0 (2.44)	517 (20.4)
Source: Best time to visit, weather and climate Poondi

== Demographics ==
As per 2011 census, Poondi has a total population of 2320 with 1199 males and 1121 females. Sex Ratio is 935. Literacy rate of Poondi is 81.55% with Male literacy as 88.08% and female literacy as 74.56%.

== Education ==
Poondi has one major educational institution called A. Veeriya Vandayar Memorial Sri Pushpam College (A.V.V.M Sri Pushpam College) which was established in the year 1956. It is an Arts and Science College which offers various undergraduate, postgraduate and research programmes.
