= Mappillai Manasu Poopola =

- Directed by: Kuruvikkarambai Shanmugam
- Written by: Kuruvikkarambai Shanmugam
- Produced by: S. Jayalakshmi
- Starring: Pandiarajan; Yuvarani
- Cinematography: Nithya
- Edited by: V. Rajagopal
- Music by: Deva
- Production company: Kuru Kalaikkoodam
- Release date: 12 April 1996
- Running time: 115 minutes
- Country: India
- Language: Tamil

Mappillai Manasu Poopola (transl. Son-in-law's heart is like a flower) is a 1996 Indian Tamil-language comedy film directed by Kuruvikkarambai Shanmugam. The film stars Pandiarajan and Yuvarani, with Vennira Aadai Moorthy, Malaysia Vasudevan, newcomer Rajaneesh Kumar, Bhagyashree, Vichithra, Pollachi Babu, Sriraj Guhan and S. N. Lakshmi playing supporting roles. It was released on 12 April 1996.

== Plot ==
Manikkam (Pandiarajan) and Raja (Rajaneesh Kumar) are best friends, they are folk singers and they study a Ph.D. in Naattupurapaattu specialty in the city. The two friends are from the same village. Raja lives with his grandmother (S. N. Lakshmi) whereas Manikkam lives with his father (Thideer Kannaiah) and mother (Srimathi). Overnight, Raja starts to act like a lunatic and his behavior worsens with time. Worried about his mental health, his grandmother and Manikkam admit him in a mental hospital. Raja stays in the hospital for a week. The doctor says that his situation is improving and that Raja can be discharged from the hospital but he is not completely recovered.

Raja seems to be normal now but sooner or later he can react like a wild person. For his study, Raja has a last oral examination to earn a Ph.D. degree. Manikkam knows that Raja will not pass it with his mental health, so during the oral examination, Manikkam does many cheap tricks to help his friend Raja and Raja finally gets his doctorate diploma.

Manikkam has a maternal uncle Ulaganathan (Vennira Aadai Moorthy) in his native village, as per the village custom, Manikkam must marry Ponni (Yuvarani). Aandhi Thevar (Malaysia Vasudevan) is a rich landlord and Ulaganathan's friend, he wants his daughter Vasanthi (Bhagyashree) to marry Raja, who is from distant family.

Raja receives a letter from Aandhi Thevar, he wants him to come to his village to marry his daughter. Thereafter, Raja, his grandmother and Manikkam go to their native village. Soon, the perfectly normal Manikkam is mistaken to be a madman by the villagers whereas the mentally ill Raja is seen as a sane person. What transpires next forms the rest of the story.

== Cast ==
- Pandiarajan as Manikkam
- Yuvarani as Ponni
- Vennira Aadai Moorthy as Ulaganathan, as Ponni's father
- Malaysia Vasudevan as Aandhi Thevar
- Rajaneesh Kumar as Raja
- Bhagyashree as Vasanthi
- Vichithra as Ganga
- Pollachi Babu as Periya Minor
- Sriraj Guhan as Chinna Minor
- S. N. Lakshmi as Raja's grandmother
- M. Varalakshmi as Aandhi Thevar's wife
- M. R. Sulakshana as Ponni's mother
- Srimathi as Manikkam's mother
- Pasi Narayanan
- Thideer Kannaiah as Manikkam's father
- Hercules Douglas as Thangavel
- Periyar Dasan as Dr. Kayalventhan

== Soundtrack ==
The soundtrack was composed by Deva, with lyrics written by Kuruvikkarambai Shanmugam.

Song	Singer(s)	Duration
"Aathu Vandhal"	Krishnaraj, Mano	5:32
"Maduraiyile"	S. P. Balasubrahmanyam, S. P. B. Pallavi	4:40
"Vada Naatil"	Rajagopal, B. S. Sasirekha	5:00
"Anthi Nera"	Krishnaraj, Sindhu	5:03
"Naan Puthanum"	Deva	4:28
