= Mannai Thottu Kumbidanum =

- Directed by: R. Umashankar
- Written by: R. Umashankar
- Produced by: Selvi Sivaguru
- Starring: Selva; Keerthana
- Cinematography: M. Kesavan
- Edited by: M. Kathirvel
- Music by: Deva
- Production company: Sri Renugambigai Movies
- Release date: 16 December 1995
- Running time: 125 minutes
- Country: India
- Language: Tamil

Mannai Thottu Kumbidanum (transl. Touch the soil and bow down) is a 1995 Indian Tamil language drama film directed by R. Umashankar, who had previously directed the film Thambi Oorukku Pudhusu (1991). The film stars Selva and Keerthana, with Rajesh, Rocky, Goundamani, Senthil, Vadivukkarasi and Kamala Kamesh playing supporting roles. It was released on 16 December 1995.

== Plot ==
Sathyamoorthy is a kind-hearted village chief who helps the poor villagers whereas Nallathambi is a heartless rich landlord who spreads terror among the villagers. His son Ramachandran and Rasathi fall in love with each other. When Sathyamoorthy becomes paralyzed, Ramachandran becomes the new village chief. In the meantime, Nallathambi wants to destroy Sathyamoorthy's family. What transpires next forms the rest of the story.

== Cast ==
- Selva as Ramachandran
- Keerthana as Rasathi
- Rajesh as Sathyamoorthy
- Rocky as Nallathambi
- Goundamani as Desingu
- Senthil as Tyre (Rajadhi Raja Raja Maarthanda Raja Gambeera Raja Kulothunga Kathavaraya Krishna Kamaraj)
- Vadivukkarasi
- Kamala Kamesh as Nallathambi's mother
- Varalakshmi as Rasathi's mother
- Thideer Kannaiah as Mannaru
- Bayilvan Ranganathan
- Premi
- Devisri
- Sharmili
- Kavithasri
- S. N. Vasanth
- Joker Thulasi

== Soundtrack ==
The soundtrack was composed by Deva.

Song	Singer(s)	Lyrics	Duration
"Aatha Muthu Mariyamma"	K. S. Chithra, Chorus	Vaali	4:38
"Enaku Indru Deepavali"	S. Kuzhanthaivelu, Minmini	Kalidasan	4:56
"Eppo Mama Kacheri"	Mano, Swarnalatha	Vaali	4:30
"Manna Thottu Kumbidanum"	Malaysia Vasudevan, Chorus	Piraisoodan	4:36
"Seethatin Kaiyai Thotta"	K. S. Chithra, Swarnalatha	Vaali	5:08
