= Marumagan =

- Directed by: Manivasagam
- Written by: Manivasagam; K. J. Anumohan (dialogues)
- Produced by: K. Balu
- Starring: Karthik; Meena
- Cinematography: A. Venkatesh
- Edited by: P. Mohanraj
- Music by: Deva
- Production company: K. B. Films
- Release date: 7 July 1995
- Running time: 150 minutes
- Country: India
- Language: Tamil

Marumagan (transl. Son-in-law) is a 1995 Indian Tamil-language drama film directed by Manivasagam. The film stars Karthik and Meena. It was released on 7 July 1995, and failed at the box office.

== Plot ==
After working in Bombay as a tailor, Thangarasu comes back home and opens a tailor shop in his neighbourhood. His specialty is taking measurements without touching the women, and his shop becomes quickly very popular among the women. Thangarasu falls in love with Manjula, the daughter of Mayilsamy Gounder. Mayilsamy Gounder, an ex-Member of Parliament and an illicit liquor smuggler, plans a return to politics. In the meantime, Thangarasu and Manjula announce their love on a TV Channel. Mayilsamy Gounder is first angry but he uses this opportunity to win the upcoming election. Everything was fine until that Thangarasu's mother Thaiyamma learns the news and she objects the marriage. What transpires later forms the crux of the story.

== Cast ==
- Karthik as Thangarasu
- Meena as Manjula
- Radha Ravi as Mayilsamy Gounder
- Nagesh
- Goundamani as Govindsamy
- Senthil
- Manorama as Thaiyamma
- R. Sundarrajan as Muniyandi
- Ponnambalam
- Kumarimuthu as Arumugam
- Suryakanth as Sengaliappan
- Chitti
- Sangeeta
- Kokila
- Lalitha Kumari as Kannamma
- Singamuthu
- Tirupur Ramasamy
- Kovai Senthil
- Chitraguptan
- Veerapathiran
- Periya Karuppu Thevar
- Jeeva
- Rajavanan

== Soundtrack ==
The music was composed by Deva, with lyrics written by Vairamuthu.

Song	Singer(s)	Duration
"En Rasave"	S. Janaki	4:21
"Laila Laila"	S. P. Balasubrahmanyam, K. S. Chithra	5:28
"Mamma Mamma"	Mano, Malgudi Subha, Manorama	4:49
"Manjula Manjula"	Suresh Peters, Swarnalatha	5:04
"Oh Ragini En Uyir" (solo)	S. P. Balasubrahmanyam	3:26
"Oh Ragini En Nilai" (Sad)	S. P. Balasubrahmanyam, S. Janaki	3:24
"Oh Ragini Neelambari" (duet)	S. P. Balasubrahmanyam, S. Janaki	5:13

== Reception ==
R. P. R. of Kalki said he could not say the film is boring but felt the director could have avoided dealing with a script which offered boredom and fatigue.
