= Rakkayi Koyil =

- Title card
- Directed by: Manivasagam
- Written by: K. C. Thangam (dialogues)
- Screenplay by: Manivasagam
- Story by: Manivasagam
- Produced by: M. Natarajan; M. Appu
- Starring: Vijayakumar; Selva; Kasthuri
- Cinematography: R. H. Ashok
- Edited by: L. Kesavan
- Music by: Ilaiyaraaja
- Production company: Patel Cine Arts
- Release date: 5 February 1993
- Running time: 145 minutes
- Country: India
- Language: Tamil

Rakkayi Koyil (transl. Rakkayi's Temple) is a 1993 Indian Tamil-language drama film, directed and co-written by Manivasagam. The film stars Vijayakumar, Selva and Kasthuri, with an ensemble supporting cast including Manorama, Goundamani and Senthil. It was released on 5 February 1993.

== Cast ==
- Vijayakumar as Bommu Nayakar
- Selva as Chinrasu
- Kasthuri as Vellaiyamma
- Manorama as Jakkamma
- Vadivukkarasi as Ramattha
- Goundamani as a barber
- Senthil as barber

== Soundtrack ==
The music was composed by Ilaiyaraaja.

Track listing
| No. | Title | Lyrics | Singer(s) | Length |
|---|---|---|---|---|
| 1. | "Aathirama Killathae" | Vaali | Mano, Minmini | 4:47 |
| 2. | "Naatukkullae Jathiyundu" | Vaali | Mano | 5:12 |
| 3. | "Ellorukkum Vandathu" | Vaali | Mano | 5:13 |
| 4. | "Unthan Paadal Ennai" | Pulamaipithan | Mano, Uma Ramanan | 5:05 |
| 5. | "Thirunaal Thodanguthu" | Vaali | Mano | 5:28 |
| Total length: | | | | 25:45 |

== Reception ==
R. P. R of Kalki praised Vijayakumar's performance and the cinematography but called Ilaiyaraaja's music average.
