= Raja Enga Raja =

- Theatrical release poster
- Directed by: T. Vijayasingam
- Screenplay by: T. Vijayasingam
- Story by: A. Veerappan
- Produced by: Rajasimman
- Starring: Goundamani; Ramya Krishnan; Sadhana
- Cinematography: Babu
- Edited by: M. G. Balu
- Music by: Ilaiyaraaja
- Production company: M. R. Movies
- Release date: 10 March 1995
- Country: India
- Language: Tamil

Raja Enga Raja (transl. Raja, our king) is a 1995 Indian Tamil language film directed by T. Vijayasingam. The film stars Goundamani, Ramya Krishnan and Sadhana. It was released on 10 March 1995.

== Plot ==
Raja is an IRS officer who works in New Delhi and is in love with his colleague and friend Prabha. However, during his visit to his hometown, a remote village in Tamil Nadu, his parents arrange his wedding with his cousin Lakshmi, an uneducated but innocent girl from the same village. Raja is forcefully married to Lakshmi due to suicide blackmail and thinks that she is of no match to him. Raja and Lakshmi leave for Delhi. Prabha gets shocked knowing about Raja's wedding but understands his situation and accepts it.

Raja feels bad as Lakshmi is uneducated and keeps scolding her often for her ignorance. Lakshmi doubts Raja having an affair with Prabha. Lakshmi also does not like Raja speaking with any of his female colleagues, which angers him further. Raja sends Lakshmi back to his village and asks her not to return to Delhi, but Raja's parents decide to unite Lakshmi and Raja.

Raja's parents take Lakshmi along with them to Delhi. They meet Prabha and understand that she is a kindhearted woman and sees Raja only as a good friend. Raja's parents advise Lakshmi not to doubt Raja's character. Lakshmi realises her mistake and starts trusting Raja. Also, Prabha starts to teach basic etiquette to Lakshmi. Lakshmi learns English and starts working as a tourist guide in Delhi. Now, Raja starts doubting Lakshmi as she speaks with many male tourists. Finally, Raja realises his mistake and patches up with Lakshmi.

== Cast ==
- Goundamani as Raja
- Ramya Krishnan as Lakshmi
- Sadhana as Prabha
- Senthil
- Manorama
- Vani
- V. K. Ramasamy
- Kallapetti Singaram as Lakshmi's father
- Vinu Chakravarthy
- Vennira Aadai Moorthy as Kuddus Rowther
- G. Srinivasan
- Nalinikanth
- Disco Shanti
- Sharmili

== Soundtrack ==
The music was composed by Ilaiyaraaja.

Song	Singers	Lyrics
Raja Enga Raja	Gangai Amaran	Manimudi
Kungumam Thane	B. S. Sasirekha	Gangai Amaran
Ooru Vittu	S. P. Sailaja, Malaysia Vasudevan, Gangai Amaran	Gangai Amaran
Pandhala Kattunga	K. S. Chithra	Gangai Amaran
