= Namma Ooru Poovatha =

- Poster
- Directed by: Manivasagam
- Written by: M. Manivasakam
- Produced by: Rajeshwari Manivasakam
- Starring: Murali; Gautami; Goundamani; Senthil
- Cinematography: K. B. Ahamad
- Edited by: L. Kesavan
- Music by: Deva
- Production company: Raaja Pushpa Pictures
- Release date: 19 November 1990
- Running time: 145 minutes
- Country: India
- Language: Tamil

Namma Ooru Poovatha (transl. Poovatha of Our Town) is a 1990 Indian Tamil-language film directed by Manivasagam and produced by Rajeshwari Manivasakam. The film stars Murali, Gautami, Goundamani and Senthil. It was released on 19 November 1990. Gautami won the Tamil Nadu State Film Award Special Prize for Best Actress for her performance in the film.

== Cast ==
- Murali as Ponarasu
- Gautami as Poovatha
- Goundamani as Everything Ekambaram
- Senthil as Ekabaram's sidekick
- Jai Ganesh
- Anandaraj
- Pasi Narayanan
- Thideer Kannaiah
- Dubbing Janaki
- K. K. Soundar
- Suryakanth
- Karuppu Subbiah
- Joker Thulasi
- Theni Kunjarammal

== Soundtrack ==
The music was composed by Deva, with lyrics by Kalidasan.

Song	Singers	Length
"Manjanathipoove"	K. S. Chithra	5:13
"Maarapu Potta Pulla"	S. P. Balasubrahmanyam, K. S. Chithra	4:43
"Mandhirichivitta Kozhi"	Malaysia Vasudevan	4:16
"Romba Naalaga Maama"	S. P. Balasubrahmanyam, K. S. Chithra	4:33
"Aavaram Poovu Onu"	K. J. Yesudas, K. S. Chithra	4:32

== Release and reception ==
Namma Ooru Poovatha was released on 19 November 1990. C. R. K. of Kalki described it is a typical love story set against a village backdrop. The reviewer praised the director's efforts to maintain the film's momentum. Gautami won the Tamil Nadu State Film Award Special Prize for Best Actress for her performance in the film.
