= Therku Theru Machan =

- Poster
- Directed by: Manivannan
- Written by: Manivannan
- Produced by: K. Prabakaran
- Starring: Sathyaraj; Bhanupriya
- Cinematography: B. R. Vijayalakshmi
- Edited by: L. Kesavan
- Music by: Deva
- Production company: Anbalaya Films
- Release date: 13 April 1992
- Running time: 150 minutes
- Country: India
- Language: Tamil

Therku Theru Machan is a 1992 Indian Tamil-language drama film written and directed by Manivannan. The film stars Sathyaraj and Bhanupriya. It was released on 13 April 1992, and completed a 100-day run.

== Plot ==
Valayapalam village's Landlord Paramasiva Gounder has two sons: Subramani and Ganesan. Ganesan, the elder one, gets married with Segamalam, daughter of village President and Landlord "School Gounder" from neighbouring Kittampalayam. In the meantime, Subramani and Sengamalam's sister Parimala fall in love with each other, though they are from different villages.

Devaraj, landlord and owner of a gambling club in Kittampalayam, wants to marry Parimala and she is his maternal cousin. But she refuses and ridicules him. So Devaraj decides to take revenge. Ganesan is a gambler and he even landed his family's bungalow to Devaraj. Devaraj tries to sell the house using court and the auction begins. At the same time, Subramani goes to local bank to receive the loan amount to settle the debt; but he sees Parimala getting same amount by pledging her jewels. She gives the amount to Subramani and Subramani settles the amount to the Officers before the third bells of auction, foiling the plans of Devaraj. Devaraj wants to absolutely split the lovers. Then, Devaraj and his cousin Nagaraj create a water dispute between the two villages, and kills four newly married youngsters from his own village, at night. This causes heavy riots and it leads the government to separate both villages. Ganesan sends Sengamalam back to her village as revenge. The State appoints a retired Judge Subramanian Iyer to inquire about the riot and provide a solution.

Subramani approaches the Judge with a plan, and with permission comes with an old man disguise to Kittampalayam as the Judge Iyer, with his cousin as helper Mani. Subramani unites Sengamalam and Ganesan, and earns the trust of the people. He starts to investigate the root of the issue: Devaraj had given huge loans to villagers of Valayapalam, who had pledged their lands to him. If the dispute continues, Valayapalayam's harvest will be totally spoiled, and thus Devaraj will get hold of those lands quickly. At the same time, Devaraj pesters his uncle to get Parimalam married to him. Out of options, School gounder organises an open wrestling tournament, where anyone who wants to marry Parimalam must compete and the last man standing, wins her. Devaraj defeats all other competition, and out of options, Subramani, in Iyer disguise fights him off. Subramani wins the competition, and marries Parimalam, to the anguish of everyone present. That night, he reveals to her that he is her lover, and they consummate their marriage.

Subramani's drama is exposed within weeks, and he escapes with Parimalam and Mani. The couple is denied entry to his village as Subramani had married one from the opposite village, and he moves to a hilltop house owned by Mani. Parimalam gets pregnant, and the issue between village remains unsolved. Subramani devises a plan and Mani, with permission from Police, takes interview of Nagaraj in his fields. Subramani then dubs over Nagaraj's voice and makes it look like Nagaraj is planning to betray Devaraj. Angered, Devaraj sends men to kill Nagaraj. Nagaraj, fearing for life, is captured by Subramani. He is brought to the Police, and the truth about riots comes to public knowledge. Devaraj, in a fit of anger, tries to kill the pregnant Parimalam, but Subramani defeats him and he is arrested. The real Judge Manivannan ends the riots and the separation between two villages, water is released and peace resumes.

== Cast ==
- Sathyaraj as Subramani
- Bhanupriya as Parimala
- K. Prabakaran as Ganesan
- Santhiya as Segamalam
- Mansoor Ali Khan as Devaraj
- R. Sundarrajan as Paramasivan
- Goundamani
- Senthil
- Alex Pandian as Kuppusamy
- R. P. Viswam as Mirasu
- Chokkalinga Bhagavathar as Kanthasamy
- Kovai Sarala
- Vasu
- Kottai Perumal
- Manivannan as Judge (cameo)

== Soundtrack ==
The soundtrack was composed by Deva, with lyrics written by Kalidasan.

Track listing
No.	Title	Singer(s)	Length
1.	"Yenga Therkutheru"	S. Janaki, S. P. Balasubrahmanyam	4:46
2.	"Thennamara Thopukule"	S. Janaki	3:39
3.	"Kora Paaya"	S. Janaki, S. P. Balasubrahmanyam	4:04
4.	"Lokku Lokku Irumalu"	S. P. Balasubrahmanyam	3:33
5.	"Ezhelu Jenma Bandham"	S. P. Balasubrahmanyam	4:06
6.	"Dhandal Edungada"	S. P. Balasubrahmanyam	4:06
7.	"Ezhelu Jenma Bandham" (Female)	S. Janaki	4:06
8.	"Thennamara Thopukulle" (Duet)	S. Janaki, S. P. Balasubrahmanyam	3:39
9.	"Malaiyeru Malaiyeru"	Malaysia Vasudevan, S. Janaki	4:14
Total length:			36:13

== Reception ==
N. Krishnaswamy of The Indian Express called it "more or less okay entertainer". Sridharan of Kalki gave the film a more negative review, but was tolerating of the music.
