= Pattathu Raani =

- Film poster
- Directed by: Manivasagam
- Written by: Manivasagam; K. C. Thangam (dialogues)
- Produced by: Rajeswari Manivasagam; P.S. Mani
- Starring: Vijayakumar; Gautami
- Cinematography: R. H. Ashok
- Edited by: L. Kesavan
- Music by: Deva
- Production company: Raja Pushpa Pictures
- Release date: 14 August 1992
- Running time: 145 minutes
- Country: India
- Language: Tamil

Pattathu Raani is a 1992 Indian Tamil-language comedy film directed by Manivasagam. The film stars Vijayakumar and Gautami, leading an ensemble cast including Manorama, Goundamani, Janagaraj, Senthil, Delhi Ganesh and Manivasagam. It was released on 14 August 1992.

== Plot ==
Jalagandeswaran and Rayappan are brothers and house owners of a small colony. The tenants refused to pay up their rents, knowing that the houses were built on State land. Rayappan has the idea to rent a vacant house to Usha, a beautiful company manageress. Usha is married to a middle-aged man Sundaram. The couple moves into their new house and befriends the neighbours. The married neighbours Jalagandeswaran, Viswanathan, Ganesan and Coimbatore fall in love with the beautiful Usha and they begin to woo the young woman. What transpires later forms the crux of the story.

== Cast ==
- Vijayakumar as Sundaram
- Gautami as Usha
- Manorama as Muniamma
- Goundamani as Jalagandeswaran
- Janagaraj as Viswanathan
- Senthil as Rayappan
- Delhi Ganesh as Ganesan
- EV Velu as Coimbatore
- Sethu Vinayagam
- Vijayaraj as Nagaraj
- Vadivukkarasi as Yamuna
- Kovai Sarala as Savitri
- Vasuki as Mami
- Deepa
- Mahesh as Ramakrishnan
- Ravali as Shanthi
- Idichapuli Selvaraj
- Karuppu Subbiah
- Vellai Subbaiah
- Thideer Kannaiah
- Pasi Sathya
- R. Sundarrajan in a guest appearance

== Soundtrack ==
The music was composed by Deva, with lyrics written by Kalidasan.

Song	Singer(s)	Duration
"Ada Thotta"	S. Janaki, Mano	4:37
"Devathi Devarum"	G. Radhika, Malaysia Vasudevan, Mano, Uma Ramanan, Krishnaraj	6:20
"Muthu Muthu"	K. S. Chithra	4:28
"Pennaga Piranthore"	K. J. Yesudas	4:41
"Sound Kodu"	Mano, K. S. Chithra	4:24

== Reception ==
K. Vijayan of New Straits Times gave the film a mixed review citing "See it with your wife and you probably enjoy it yourself" and described the film as "comedy loses steam midway". The Indian Express praised the artiste's performances and dialogues.
