= Summa Irunga Machan =

- VCD cover
- Directed by: S. N. Prasad
- Screenplay by: S. N. Prasad
- Story by: Maruthi Art Films
- Produced by: Jothi Prasad
- Starring: Pandiarajan; Pragathi; Divyasri
- Cinematography: Nithya
- Edited by: Banerjee
- Music by: Deva
- Production company: Maruthi Art Films
- Release date: 15 March 1996
- Running time: 130 minutes
- Country: India
- Language: Tamil

Summa Irunga Machan (transl. Be quiet man!) is a 1996 Indian Tamil-language comedy film directed by S. N. Prasad. The film stars Pandiarajan, Pragathi and Divyasri, with Malaysia Vasudevan, Kovai Sarala, Kavitha, Charle and Alex playing supporting roles. It was released on 15 March 1996. The film was remade in Telugu as Iddaru Attala Muddula Alludu (2006).

== Plot ==
Subramani is a jobless youth living in a remote village. He leaves his village to rejoin his uncle in Chennai. To his surprise, his uncle has two wives : Paramu and Rajamma, they live in different houses and his uncle struggles between his two wives. Paramu's daughter is Uma and Rajamma's daughter is Rama, both study in the same college. Subramani's uncle advises him to hide his identity and to act as a servant, Paramu and Rajamma hire them. Uma and Rama fall in love with Subramani. Unlike his uncle, Subramani is against polygamy. What transpires next forms the rest of the story.

== Cast ==
- Pandiarajan as Subramani
- Pragathi as Uma
- Divyasri as Rama
- Malaysia Vasudevan as Subramani's uncle
- Kovai Sarala as Paramu
- Kavitha as Rajamma
- Charle as Sigamani
- Alex
- Loose Mohan
- Thideer Kannaiah
- Pragatheesh
- Bharathan
- Vinayak Raj
- Babu
- Premi
- Shoruba
- Manimekalai
- Master Padusha
- Deva in a guest appearance

== Soundtrack ==
The music was composed by Deva, with lyrics written by Kalidasan.

Song	Singer(s)	Length
"Chandiranum Onnuthan"	Deva	3:33
"Pattam Pattam Pattampoochi"	Loganathan	3:47
"Maama Maama"	Sindhu, T. K. Kala, Mano	4:04
"Tik Tik Tik"	K. S. Chithra, Mano	4:03
"Kadhalukku Kannirukku"	Mano, Swarnalatha	4:36
