= Urimai Por =

- VCD cover
- Directed by: Raja Rajendran
- Written by: Raja Rajendran
- Produced by: Shiva Balajee
- Starring: Arun Pandian; Ranjitha
- Cinematography: R. Selva
- Edited by: N. Chandran
- Music by: Deva
- Production company: Deepa Lakshmi Cine Arts
- Release date: 19 October 1998
- Running time: 115 minutes
- Country: India
- Language: Tamil

Urimai Por (transl. War for rights) is a 1998 Indian Tamil-language crime film directed by Raja Rajendran. The film stars Arun Pandian and Ranjitha, with Anandaraj, Mansoor Ali Khan, Ponnambalam, Ajay Rathnam and Vinu Chakravarthy playing supporting roles. It was released on 19 October 1998 as one among many Diwali releases.

== Plot ==
The film starts with the loan shark Balu (Mansoor Ali Khan) and his gang coming to ask for his loaned money back from a couple who borrowed it. The couple says that they don't have money so Balu kills the man and he brutally rapes the woman (Varsha) in their house. The woman then runs to the nearby police station and commits suicide with a police constable's bayonet. Then the honest Assistant Commissioner of Police Raja Yesu Mohamed (Arun Pandian) beats the rapist Balu up and puts him behind the bar. A few hours later, Raja Yesu Mohamed is pressured by his superiors and the local politicians to release Balu. Balu's lawyers bail him out of jail and Balu vows to take revenge on Raja Yesu Mohamed. Balu, Marthandan (Ponnambalam) and J. K. B (Anandaraj) are brothers and criminals, the elder brother J. K. B is the most dangerous among them.

Chandru (Chandru) and Sumathi, who are in love, secretly arrange to get married soon. A few days later, however, Sumathi disappears after trying to withdraw all of her money from a chit fund company. In the meantime, that chit fund company dupes over many people with the managing director of the company Sathiyaseelan (Dhadha Muthukumar) being found hanging in his office. J. K. B then threatens Chandru to kill his family if he doesn't withdraw Sumathi's missing-person case. When Sumathi's sister Anitha asks Chandru about Sumathi, Chandru lies to her that he has never known Sumathi. Anitha then complains to Raja Yesu Mohamed, he beats Chandru up and Chandru tells Raja Yesu Mohamed everything. Thereafter, Raja Yesu Mohamed arrests the chit fund company manager and he confesses everything.

The chit fund company real owner was in fact Marthandan. Before joining Marthandan's company, Sathiyaseelan worked in many chit fund companies and enjoyed a solid reputation by the customers for being honest. The customers deposited a total of ₹25 crore. Marthandan decided to scam the customers, to shut its office and to disappear but Sathiyaseelan refused to cooperate. That day, most investors complained of not having received any returns as promised in its office. Marthandan hanged him in his office's basement and Sumathi, who witnessed the murder, was also killed by Marthandan.

Raja Yesu Mohamed then arrests Marthandan. J. K. B's henchmen manage to kill chit fund company manager, the only witness of the scam and Marthandan is released. J. K. B then uses his power to transfer Raja Yesu Mohamed to a remote village. The people start demonstrating to not transfer the honest police officer Raja Yesu Mohamed. The Chief Minister (Latha) cancels the transfer and praises him for his work. Once, he is back to his post, Raja Yesu Mohamed beats up Balu and Marthandan and arrests them. Marthandan is then sentenced to life imprisonment and Balu is released for lack of evidence. One night, J. K. B and Balu enter with their henchmen in Raja Yesu Mohamed's house. They beat him up and tie him up with a rope. His wife Ranji (Ranjitha) and his son are gunned down by them in front of the powerless Raja Yesu Mohamed.

Thereafter, J. K. B's match factory is caught on fire and 50 children died during the incident. Raja Yesu Mohamed finds out that the factory didn't fabricate matches but it fabricated grenades. Raja Yesu Mohamed takes a machine gun and goes to J. K. B's house. There, he goes berserk and kills Balu but J. K. B manages to run away. J. K. B is now wanted by the police. J. K. B and his henchmen go to a remote village and threaten the villagers with machine guns. J. K. B then calls Raja Yesu Mohamed, Raja Yesu Mohamed orders him to surrender but J. K. B threatens to kill the villagers if he doesn't come. Raja Yesu Mohamed manages to kill the henchmen and J. K. B begs to spare his life but Raja Yesu Mohamed cut his throat with a Machete.

== Cast ==
- Arun Pandian as ACP Raja Yesu Mohamed
- Ranjitha as Ranji
- Anandaraj as J. K. B
- Mansoor Ali Khan as Balu
- Ponnambalam as Marthandan
- Ajay Rathnam
- Vinu Chakravarthy
- Latha as Chief Minister
- Suryakanth
- Chandru as Chandru
- K. K. Soundar as Chandru's father
- Dhadha Muthukumar as Sathiyaseelan
- Anuja as Chandra
- Varsha
- Usha Priya as Chandru's mother
- John Babu
- S. N. Surendar in a guest appearance

== Soundtrack ==
The music was composed by Deva, with lyrics written by Kalidasan, Ponniyin Selvan, Anbu Deepan, and Sivanandan.

Song	Singer(s)	Lyrics	Duration
"Aarambam Nallairukku"	Deva	Anbu Deepan	4:39
"Erode Santhaiyiley"	Murali, Swarnalatha	Ponniyin Selvan	4:45
"Sottu Sottu Mazhaithuli"	Swarnalatha	Ponniyin Selvan	5:18
"Ilangkaali Deviamma"	K. S. Chithra	Kalidasan	5:26
"Karumegam Mazhaiyatchu"	Krishnaraj	Sivanandan	5:26
