= Vaidehi Kalyanam =

- VCD cover
- Directed by: Manivasagam
- Written by: Manivasagam
- Produced by: Rajeswari Manivasagam; P. S. Mani
- Starring: R. Sarathkumar; Rekha; Ramarjun; Uthra
- Cinematography: K. B. Ahamad
- Edited by: L. Kesavan
- Music by: Deva
- Production company: Raja Pushpa Pictures
- Release date: 11 July 1991
- Running time: 140 minutes
- Country: India
- Language: Tamil

Vaidehi Kalyanam (transl. Vaidehi's wedding) is a 1991 Indian Tamil-language drama film directed by Manivasagam. The film stars R. Sarathkumar, Rekha, Ramarjun and Uthra, with Delhi Ganesh, Goundamani, Senthil, Ilavarasan and Kavitha playing supporting roles. It was released on 11 July 1991.

== Plot ==
Rajamanickam is the village chief and he is respected among the villagers. He has two daughters : Gowri and Vaidehi. Gowri is married to a rich drunkard who beats her while Vaidehi is a college student. Later, Rajamanickam's servant Chinnasamy's son Kalyanam and Vaidehi fall in love with each other. In the meantime, the doctor Krishnamoorthy comes to Rajamanickam's village and Rajamanickam loans him a clinic. The school teacher Vasanthi has a boy but has no husband, they live near Kalyanam's house. Vasanthi advises Kalyanam to not elope with Vaidehi but to marry her with Rajamanickam's blessing.

In the past, Rajamanickam was the manager of a textile company. Rajamanickam and Vasanthi had an affair but Vasanthi was not aware that Rajamanickam is already married. Being already married, Rajamanickam refused to marry Vasanthi. Rajamanickam asked her to become his mistress but she challenged him to become his wife.

One day, Vasanthi has an accident and Rajamanickam admits her at the hospital. Rajamanickam persists in accepting her as his mistress. Later, Vasanthi gives tuition to Vaidehi. Rajamanickam decides to arrange the wedding between Krishnamoorthy and Vaidehi. Krishnamoorthy is, in fact, a womaniser. What transpires later forms the crux of the story.

== Cast ==
- R. Sarathkumar as Rajamanickam
- Rekha as Vasanthi
- Ramarjun as Kalyanam (Kalyanasundaram)
- Uthra as Vaidehi
- Delhi Ganesh as Chinnasamy
- Goundamani as Pachamuthu
- Senthil as Thangamuthu
- Ilavarasan as Krishnamoorthy
- Kavitha
- Chitraguptan as Thangamuthu's son
- Master Ramesh as Prabhu
- Pasi Narayanan as Kandasamy
- Karuppu Subbiah as Pazhanisamy
- Thideer Kannaiah as Boopathi
- Tirupur Ramasamy as Ramasamy

== Soundtrack ==
The soundtrack was composed by Deva, with lyrics written by Kalidasan.

Song	Singer(s)	Duration
"Jootudhan Jootudhan"	S. P. Balasubrahmanyam, K. S. Chithra	4:31
"Chinna Chinna Poove"	K. J. Yesudas, K. S. Chithra	4:59
"Mathaalam Thatungadi"	Malaysia Vasudevan, K. S. Chithra, Gangai Amaran	4:10
"Kalyaanam Kalyaanam"	Sunandha	4:18
"Thaen Thoovum Vasandham"	Mano, K. S. Chithra	4:45
"Panjali Kiliye Kiliye"	S. P. Balasubrahmanyam	4:40

== Reception ==
N. Krishnaswamy of The Indian Express wrote, "Frankly one wonders how scriptwriters take up such themes as this; [..] and is handled in such a raw manner." C. R. K. of Kalki criticised nearly every aspect of the film for being formulaic.
