= Sivantha Malar =

- Directed by: Sasi Mohan
- Written by: Selva
- Produced by: K. R. Gangadharan
- Starring: R. Sarathkumar; Gautami
- Cinematography: V. Ramesh Babu
- Edited by: M. V. Natarajan
- Music by: Maragadha Mani
- Production company: KRG International
- Release date: 6 March 1992
- Running time: 93 minutes
- Country: India
- Language: Tamil

Sivantha Malar (transl. Red Flower) is a 1992 Indian Tamil-language action thriller film directed by Sasi Mohan, written by Selva and produced by K. R. Gangadharan. The film stars R. Sarathkumar and Gautami, while Vijayakumar and Srividya play supporting roles. It was released on 6 March 1992.

== Cast ==
- R. Sarathkumar as Inspector Vijay
- Gautami as Prabha
- Vijayakumar
- Srividya
- Goundamani as Maaran
- Senthil
- Delhi Ganesh as Minister Sivalingam
- Vijay

== Soundtrack ==
The soundtrack were composed by Maragadha Mani.

- "Edhuvarai Pogum" – S. P. Balasubrahmanyam, K. S. Chithra
- "Oru Nimisham" – K. S. Chithra
- "Eriyude" – S. P. Balasubrahmanyam, K. S. Chithra
- "Oru Paattu" – S. P. Balasubrahmanyam, K. S. Chithra

== Reception ==
The Indian Express wrote that script is inspired from the French film La Femme Nikita with the director's previous film Rudhra also being inspired from that film and that "script comes up with unexpected situations".
