= Jallikattu Kaalai =

1994 film by Manivasagam

- Poster
- Directed by: Manivasagam
- Written by: Manivasagam; K. C. Thangam (dialogues)
- Produced by: K. Balu
- Starring: Prabhu; Kanaka
- Cinematography: R. Raghunatha Reddy
- Edited by: L. Kesavan
- Music by: Deva
- Production company: K. B. Films
- Release date: 2 November 1994
- Running time: 161 minutes
- Country: India
- Language: Tamil

Jallikattu Kaalai (pronounced [kaːɭaɪ] transl. The Jallikattu Bull) is a 1994 Indian Tamil-language film directed by Manivasagam, starring Prabhu and Kanaka. The film was released on 2 November 1994.

== Plot ==
Gopalakrishnan works in a mill owned by a vicious landlord named Sundara Gounder. Radha, Gounder's daughter, returns to the village after her studies and falls in love with Gopalakrishnan. Gounder is a man of loose character who has raped many women.

When Sundara Gounder knows about his daughter's love, Sundara Gounder arranges her marriage in a hurry, to a fraud. Before the marriage, her fiancé makes a deal with Loose Gounder: Loose Gounder can spend one night with Radha and can do whatever he wants. Gopalakrishnan then stops the marriage and the fraud is arrested by the police. Sundara Gounder apologises to Gopalakrishnan and Radha marries her lover Gopalakrishnan.

Loose Gounder, who cannot digest that his plan failed, kills one of Gopalakrishnan's calves and the first night is therefore cancelled. One night, Radha sees her husband Gopalakrishnan having a conversation with the flower seller Poovatha. When Radha asks her to explain what happened, Poovatha lies to her that she had sexual intercourse with her husband Gopalakrishnan prior to their marriage.

At their first night, Gopalakrishnan clarifies that Poovatha had lied, but Radha does not believe him and Gopalakrishnan challenges her to prove her wrong right away. Poovatha was actually forced to lie because Loose Gounder raped her in the past and he had promised Poovatha to marry her. Thereafter, Loose Gounder kills Poovatha in her house and at that time, Gopalakrishnan comes to her house. Radha, who secretly followed him after the quarrel, believes that Gopalakrishnan killed Poovatha.

Gopalakrishnan eventually finds the culprit, but in the meantime, Loose Gounder kidnaps him and his wife. The film ends with Loose Gounder being killed by Gopalakrishnan's cow, the mother of the killed calf.

== Cast ==
- Prabhu as Gopalakrishnan
- Kanaka as Radha
- Anandaraj as a Loose Gounder
- Shenbagam as Poovatha
- Goundamani as Aarusamy, Gopalakrishnan's uncle
- Senthil as Punnakku
- Manorama as Subbulakshmi, Gopalakrishnan's mother
- Malaysia Vasudevan as Sundara Gounder, Radha's father
- Suryakanth
- Prasanna Kumar as Astrologer
- Shoban
- Sangeetha as Vijayalakshmi (Radha's mother)
- Ragasudha
- Shakeela as Pushpavanam
- Karuppu Subbiah
- Pasi Narayanan
- Thiruppur Ramasamy
- Chitraguptan

== Soundtrack ==
The music was composed by Deva, with lyrics written by Kalidasan.

Song	Singer(s)	Duration
"Aanakili"	Mano, Swarnalatha	6:14
"Nadaya Ithu Nadaya"	S. P. Balasubrahmanyam	5:13
"Nimmathi Enna Vilai"	S. P. Balasubrahmanyam	5:08
"Sirumalli Poove"	Mano, K. S. Chithra	5:04
"Thookanakuruvi"	S. P. Balasubrahmanyam, K. S. Chithra	4:57

== Reception ==
K. Vijiyan of the New Straits Times described the film as "tedious" and wrote that "it did not live up to expectations". The Indian Express wrote, "Its the oft-repeated story [..] The situations are routine and scenes clichéd."
