= Munarivippu =

- Poster
- Directed by: R. S. Boovan
- Written by: R. S. Boovan
- Produced by: P. Jayaraman
- Starring: Sarathkumar; Heera
- Cinematography: M. Chandramouli
- Edited by: Ashok Mehtha
- Music by: Deva
- Production company: Supreme Movies
- Release date: 18 June 1993
- Country: India
- Language: Tamil

Munarivippu (transl. Warning) is a 1993 Indian Tamil-language action thriller film directed by Bhuvan in his debut. The film stars Sarathkumar and Heera, while Napoleon, Chinni Jayanth and S. S. Chandran play supporting roles. It was released on 18 June 1993.

== Cast ==
- Sarathkumar as Gopi
- Heera as Padma
- Napoleon as Ranjith
- Chinni Jayanth

== Production ==
R. S. Bhuvan, who previously assisted R. K. Selvamani, made his directorial debut with this film.

== Music ==
The music was composed by Deva and lyrics written by Vaali.

Song	Singers
"Thottathellam"	Sunandha
"Nee Thaane"	S. Janaki
"Kettuko En Paattu"	S. Janaki
"Kannil Ner Ennadi"	Minmini

== Reception ==
Malini Mannath of The Indian Express wrote that the director "could have done a better job on his screenplay and treatment and avoided the jerky narration and hotch-potch of situations". R. P. R. of Kalki lauded the fight sequences taking place in a location resembling the Guna Caves, but wrote that there was otherwise nothing spectacular about the film.
