= Kattabomman (film) =

- Theatrical release poster
- Directed by: Manivasagam
- Written by: Manivasagam
- Produced by: Rajeswari Manivasagam
- Starring: Sarathkumar; Vineetha
- Cinematography: K. B. Dhayalan
- Edited by: L. Kesavan
- Music by: Deva
- Production company: Raja Pushpa Pictures
- Release date: 13 November 1993
- Running time: 140 minutes
- Country: India
- Language: Tamil

Kattabomman is a 1993 Indian Tamil-language masala film written and directed by Manivasagam. The film stars Sarathkumar and Vineetha. It was released on 13 November 1993 during Diwali.

== Plot ==
The village chairman Kalingarayan and his son Rajappa spread terror among the villagers. Kattabomman is an angry man who cannot tolerate injustice. He was brought up by his grandfather and his widowed mother. His family and Kalingarayan's family are in a feud for several years. Kattabomman falls in love with Kalingarayan's daughter Priya and he marries her despite their families' wishes. In anger, his grandfather tells of their past. What transpires later forms the crux of the story.

== Cast ==
- Sarathkumar as Kattabomman
- Vineetha as Priya
- Nagesh as Kattabomman's grandfather
- Srividya as Devada, Kattabomman's sister-in-law
- Goundamani as Subramani
- Senthil as Pazhani
- Vijayakumar as Ponnurangam, Kattabomman's father
- Sakthivel as Kalingarayan
- Kavitha as Saroja, Kalingarayan's wife
- Uday Prakash as Rajappa
- Poonam Dasgupta as Rani
- S. N. Lakshmi
- Varalakshmi as Kattabomman's mother
- Prasanna Kumar as Iyer Mama
- Vasuki as Azhamu Mami
- Karuppu Subbiah
- Tiruppur Ramasamy as Ramasamy

== Soundtrack ==
The music was composed by Deva, with lyrics written by Kalidasan. The song "Priya Priya Oh Priya" was later reused by Deva as Priya Priya for the Kannada film Simhadriya Simha. It was also copied in Hindi by Adesh Srivastav as Piya Piya O Piya in the movie Jane Tamanna. The song is set in the raga Mohanam.

Song	Singer(s)	Duration
"Enga Then Pandi"	Malaysia Vasudevan, Swarnalatha	4:27
"Koondaivittu"	K. J. Yesudas, P. Susheela	4:42
"Palaivanathil"	S. P. Balasubrahmanyam, K. S. Chithra	5:05
"Priya Priya"	S. P. Balasubrahmanyam, K. S. Chithra	5:13
"Thulasi Chediyoram"	S. Janaki	4:31

== Reception ==
Malini Mannath of The Indian Express wrote, "Kattabomman is a fiasco and the only way to enjoy the film is to close one's eyes and ears". Thulasi of Kalki wrote that the director made an engine out of all spare parts, one should wait and see whether it would run in horse power or will fade. K. Vijiyan of New Straits Times wrote, "The storyline is quite predictable and the five songs are no help [...] Catch this movie if you have absolutely nothing to do or if you are a great fan of the Goundamani-Senthil comedy duo".
