= Periya Gounder Ponnu =

- Theatrical release poster
- Directed by: Manivasagam
- Written by: Manivasagam; Erode Soundar (dialogues)
- Produced by: Rajeswari Manivasagam; P. S. Mani
- Starring: R. Sarathkumar; Gautami
- Cinematography: R. H. Ashok
- Edited by: L. Kesavan
- Music by: Deva
- Production company: Raaja Pushpa Pictures
- Release date: 28 February 1992
- Running time: 145 minutes
- Country: India
- Language: Tamil

Periya Gounder Ponnu (transl. Daughter of Periya Gounder) is a 1992 Indian Tamil-language drama film, directed by Manivasagam. The film stars R. Sarathkumar and Gautami, with Manorama, Goundamani, Senthil, Jai Ganesh, Vadivukkarasi, Delhi Ganesh and Vijayaraj in supporting roles. It was released on 28 February 1992.

== Plot ==
Periya Saamy, called Periya Gounder by the villagers, is the village chief and a wealthy respected man in his village. His daughter Manjula, an arrogant girl who studied in the city, comes back to her village during summer vacations. Her cousin Thangamuthu is an educated blacksmith and lives with his widowed mother. He is the future husband of Manjula as per the village custom. But Periya Saamy does not want to marry a man from a poor family, so he refuses Thangamuthu and Manjula's marriage.

Periya Saamy slowly falls in love with the village belle Jillu and she becomes his secret mistress. He even accepts to marry his daughter with his mistress's rowdy brother. One day, Manjula insults Thangamuthu and his mother. Enraged, he ties a mangalasutra around her neck. What transpires next forms the rest of the story.

== Cast ==
- R. Sarathkumar as Thangamuthu
- Gautami as Manjula
- Manorama as Thangamuthu's mother
- Goundamani as Pazhanisamy
- Senthil
- Jai Ganesh as Periya Saamy (Periya Gounder)
- Vadivukkarasi as Deivatha
- Delhi Ganesh as Thangamuthu's father
- Vijayaraj
- Pasi Narayanan
- Jillu as Jillu
- Thideer Kannaiah
- Sharmili as Kanthamani
- Karuppu Subbiah
- Senji Krishnan
- Chandrika
- Umasri

== Soundtrack ==
The music was composed by Deva, with lyrics written by Kalidasan.

Song	Singer(s)	Duration
"Summa Summa"	Mano	4:16
"Kottampatti"	Malaysia Vasudevan, Sundarrajan	4:39
"Chikku Mukku"	S. Janaki	4:23
"Naalu Vartha"	Krishnaraj	4:42
"Kaattu Karisalile"	Malaysia Vasudevan, Swarnalatha	4:10

== Reception ==
NKS of The Indian Express wrote, "Such a skewed scenario notwithstanding, director Manivasagam keeps the drama going because of good performances [..]." C. R. K. of Kalki also gave the same comments on his review.
