= Goundamani =

Indian actor, comedian (born 1939)

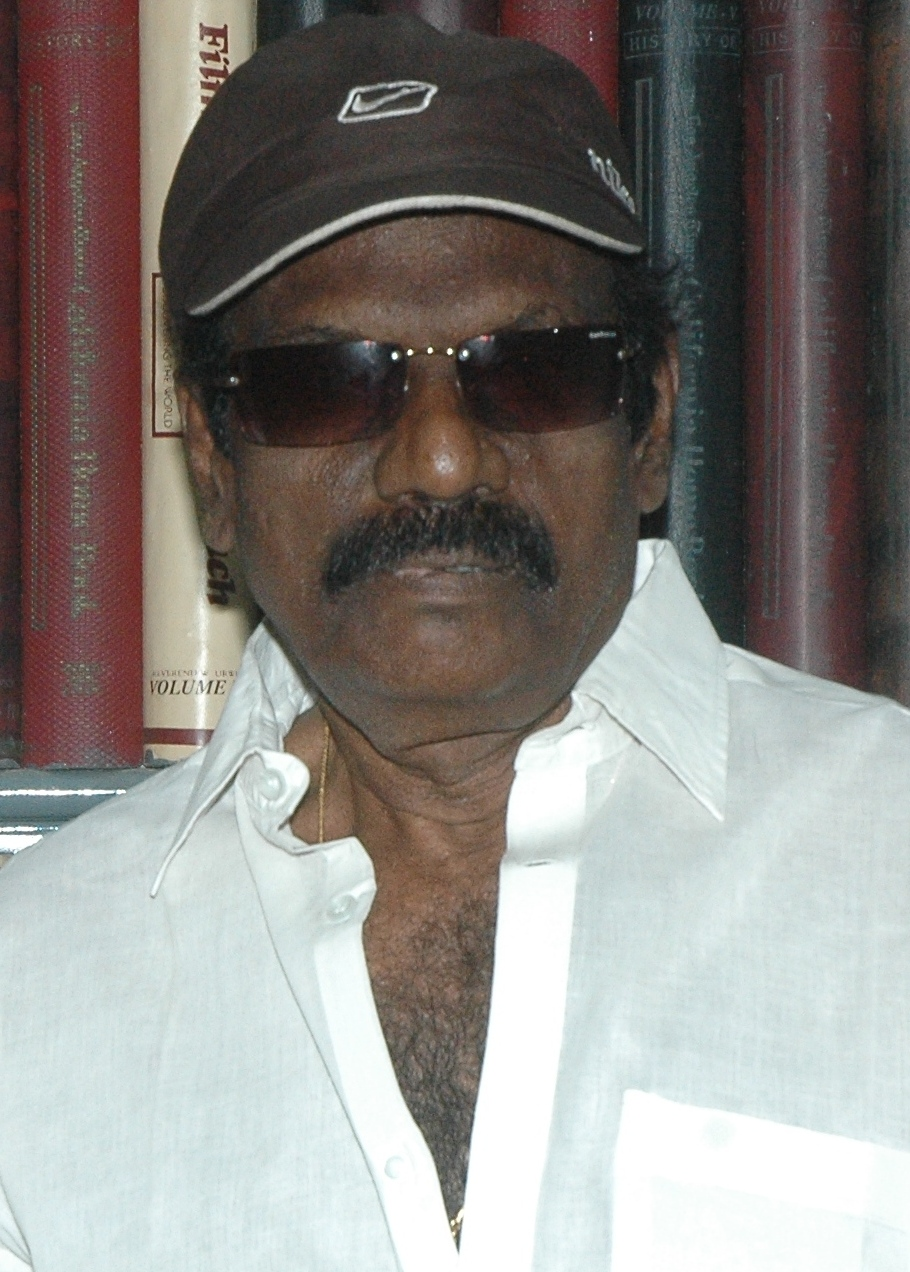
- Born: Subramaniyan Karuppaiya; 25 May 1939 (age 87); Vallakundapuram, Udumalaipettai, Coimbatore, Madras Presidency, British India
- Occupations: Actor; comedian
- Years active: 1964–2016; 2025–present
- Spouse: Shanthi (m. 1963; died 2025)
- Children: 2

Subramaniyan Karuppaiya (born 25 May 1939), known by his stage name Goundamani, is an Indian actor and comedian who works in Tamil cinema. He is known for his comic duo partnership in Tamil films with fellow actor Senthil. The pair dominated the Tamil industry as comedians in the 1980s and 1990s.

Popularly known as "Counter Mani" because he specialised in giving counterarguments, he was called Goundamani as a misconception by actor/director K. Bhagyaraj and the pseudonym stuck. He has the ability to give counterarguments on the spot and off the script on stage and during shooting. He was at his peak of his career as a comedian in Tamil cinema for nearly 40 years. Despite his popularity, Goundamani is known for being a social recluse.

== Early life ==
Goundamani was born as Subramaniyan on 25 May 1939 at Vallakundapuram, a village near Udumalaipettai in Coimbatore, Tamil Nadu, India. His father is Karuppaiya and his mother is Annammal. He married Shanthi in 1963 and has 2 daughters.

== Career ==
On having interest in acting, he went to Chennai and initially started acting in theatre dramas and then entered into the Tamil film industry (Kollywood) due to his strong theatrical background. He portrayed a role of Ramasamy Gounder in an play and many started to call him Gounder which led him to add it to his real name Mani and named himself Goundamani.

He made his film acting debut in Server Sundaram where he featured in a minor and uncredited role as a driver. He made his full-fledged debut in 1977 film 16 Vayathinile where he played the role of Rajinikanth's sidekick. His role in the 1977 P. Bharathiraja directorial was also Goundamani's first credited role in his film career.

Goundamani has played lead roles in a few films during his career, but is predominantly a supporting actor playing comedy roles. While performing roles of a solo comedian in films, he often co-starred with Senthil to form a comedy duo. The pair was described as "Tamil cinema's Laurel and Hardy" and have performed slapstick humour in many Tamil films from the mid-1980s until the early 2000s. Both of them are also remembered as partners-in-crime and also known for their chemistry.

Both Goundamani and Senthil were critically acclaimed for their career defining performance in Gangai Amaren's directorial Karakattakkaran (1989). Karakattakaran also coincidentally marked Goundamani and Senthil's 100th film as comedians together. Senthil and Goundamani both reportedly spent full 28 days on set during the shooting of the film. Goundamani's phrases in one of the comedy scenes featured in Karakattakaran, "Adhu enda enna pathu andha kelvi ketta?" (transl. Why did you look at me and ask that question) when Senthil asked him "Intha cara vachiruntha Sopanasundhariya yaaru vaichiruka" (transl. If you had this car, who has Soppanasundari) became the highlight of the film and later became viral internet memes.

Goundamani's comedy scene from Thangamana Raasa (1989) is also best remembered by critics for dreaming of singing under the music of Ilaiyaraja when he was spending a jail term for petty crime. His one line phrases "Start the music", "Arasiyal la ithellam saatharnamappa" (transl. This is all normal in politics) and "Kosu thollai thaanga mudiyala pa" (transl. Can't deal with mosquito's annoyance) which featured in the 1992 film Suriyan also later became a viral meme and trendsetter in Internet.

After recuperating from diabetes and respiratory illnesses during the late 2000s, he featured in Vaaimai and also played the lead role in 49-O, which began productions in 2013. It was directed by debutant Arokiadoss, a former assistant of Gautham Vasudev Menon. In 2019, he was approached by film director R. Kannan and actor Santhanam to cast him in a supporting role for their film project but Goundamani reportedly turned down the offer as he was sceptical about the role. In 2025, his political comedy film Otha Votu Muthaiya was released. With his impeccable comic timing and charismatic screen presence, Goundamani once again proves why he remains an iconic figure in Tamil cinema.

== Filmography ==
=== 1960s ===
List of Goundamani 1960s film credits
Year	Title	Role	Notes
1964	Server Sundaram	Driver	Uncredited role
1967	Selva Magal	Office clerk	Uncredited role

=== 1970s ===
List of Goundamani 1970s film credits
Year	Title	Role	Notes
1970	Raman Ethanai Ramanadi	School van driver	Uncredited role
1971	Thenum Paalum	Subramaniyan	Uncredited role
1977	16 Vayathinile	Koothu	
1978	Kizhake Pogum Rail	Ramaiya	
1978	Sigappu Rojakal	Manager	
1979	Anandam Enndru Arambam		
1979	Puthiya Vaarpugal	Ammavasai	
1979	Suvarilladha Chiththirangal	Kaliyannan	

=== 1980s ===
List of Goundamani 1980s film credits
Year	Title	Role	Notes
1980	Paruvathin Vasalile		
1980	Kallukkul Eeram		
1980	Mangala Nayagi		
1980	Vasantha Azhaippugal		
1980	Enga Ooru Rasathi		
1980	Saranam Ayyappa		
1981	Devi Dharisanam		
1981	Velichathukku Vanga		
1981	Netrikan	Singaram	
1981	Nenjile Thunivirunthal		
1981	Kudumbam Oru Kadambam	House owner	
1982	Anandha Ragam		
1982	Ilanjodigal	Assistant commissioner	
1982	Pakkathu Veetu Roja		
1982	Antha Rathirikku Satchi Illai		
1982	Valibamey Vaa Vaa		
1982	Agaya Gangai	Arumugam	
1982	Mullillatha Roja		
1982	Nizhal Thedum Nenjangal		
1983	Uyirullavarai Usha		
1983	Inimai Idho Idho	Panchayat head	
1983	Kaadhal Oviyam	Nayanam	
1983	Malaiyoor Mambattiyan	'Silk' Singaram	
1983	Thoongadhe Thambi Thoongadhe	Assistant of the estate manager	
1983	Aanandha Kummi		
1984	Komberi Mookan		
1984	Naan Paadum Paadal	Surya Kumar	
1984	Neram Nalla Neram		
1984	Nilavu Suduvathillai		
1984	Naalai Unathu Naal	Varadhan	
1984	Priyamudan Prabhu		
1984	Unnai Naan Santhithen	Pandiya	
1984	Thambathigal		
1984	Vaidehi Kathirunthal	All-in-All Azhagu Raja	
1985	Raja Gopuram		
1985	Rajathi Rojakili	Soora Thevar	
1985	Alai Osai		
1985	Anthasthu	Devdas	
1985	Mannukketha Ponnu	Vishamurukki Veluchamy	
1985	Kanni Rasi	Gopikrishna	
1985	Vellai Manasu		
1985	Idhu Engal Rajyam		
1985	Udaya Geetham	Balaji	
1985	Karuppu Chattaikaran		
1985	Annai Bhoomi	Ragappa	
1985	Anbin Mugavari		
1985	Karpoora Deepam		
1985	Meendum Parasakthi		
1985	Aasha		
1985	Thendral Thodatha Malar		
1985	Pagal Nilavu	George Kutty	
1985	Naane Raja Naane Mandhiri	Kuppusamy	
1985	Amudha Gaanam		
1985	Aagaya Thamaraigal	Boopathy	
1985	Hello Yaar Pesurathu		
1985	Eetti		
1985	Marudhani	School Teacher	
1985	Karaiyai Thodadha Alaigal		
1985	Idhaya Kovil	Logidhasan Bhagavathar	
1985	Panam Pathum Seiyum		
1985	Pattuchelai		
1985	Geethanjali		
1985	Japanil Kalyanaraman	Mayilsamy	
1986	Meendum Pallavi		
1986	Jeevanathi		
1986	Mr. Bharath	Sanjeevi	
1986	Karimedu Karuvayan		
1986	December Pookal	Mestri Mayilsamy	
1986	Rasigan Oru Rasigai		
1986	Maragatha Veenai	School headmaster	
1986	Dharma Pathini	"Pothuppani" Ponnuchamy	
1986	Thalaiyaati Bommaigal		
1986	Paadum Paravaigal		Partially reshot version
1986	Isai Paadum Thendral		
1986	Aayiram Pookkal Malarattum		
1986	Vesham		
1986	Piranthaen Valarnthaen	Raja	
1986	Engal Thaikulame Varuga		
1986	Mannukkul Vairam	Esakki	
1987	Idhu Oru Thodar Kathai		
1987	Per Sollum Pillai		
1987	Jaathi Pookkal		
1987	Dhoorathu Pachai		
1987	Ninaive Oru Sangeetham	Chinnukaruppandevar	
1987	Gramatthu Minnal		
1988	Sakkarai Pandhal		
1988	Manamagale Vaa		
1989	Rasathi Kalyanam		
1989	Enne Petha Raasa	Raja and Ganesan's father	
1989	Enga Ooru Mappillai		
1989	Pennbuthi Pin Buthi		
1989	Ninaivu Chinnam	Kundalakesi	
1989	Karagattakaran	'Thavil Vidhwan' Thangavelu	
1989	Raaja Raajathan		
1989	Ponmana Selvan	Hong Kong Annamalai	
1989	Anbu Kattalai		
1989	Thangamana Raasa	Subaiya (Subramani)	
1989	Vaathiyaar Veettu Pillai	Chinna Muthu	
1989	Manasukketha Maharasa		
1989	Mundhanai Sabatham		

=== 1990s ===
List of Goundamani 1990s film credits
Year	Title	Role	Notes
1990	Vaazhkai Chakkaram	Constable	
1990	Paattali Magan	Dharmadi Dharmalingam	
1990	Salem Vishnu	Kathavarayan	
1990	Paattukku Naan Adimai		
1990	Thangathin Thangam		
1990	Neengalum Herothan	Pavadaikanth	
1990	Ulagam Pirandhadhu Enakkaga	'Suthi' Josiyar	
1990	Periya Idathu Pillai		
1990	Madurai Veeran Enga Saami	'Balloon' Kandasamy	
1990	Ooru Vittu Ooru Vanthu	Captain Tamilarasu	
1990	Velai Kidaichuduchu		
1990	Patanathil Petti		
1990	My Dear Marthandan	Idea Mani	
1990	Puthu Paatu	Palanisamy	
1990	Nadigan	Kurangu Kannayiram	
1990	Namma Ooru Poovatha	Everything Ekambaram	
1991	Naadu Adhai Naadu		
1991	Naan Pudicha Mappillai	Thandavarayan	
1991	Pudhu Manithan	Rasappa	
1991	Chinna Thambi	Kanthasamy	
1991	En Rasavin Manasile		
1991	Adhikari		
1991	Marikozhundhu	Building constructor	
1991	Idhaya Vaasal	Balaraman	
1991	Cheran Pandiyan	Mechanic Manikkam	
1991	Ayul Kaithi	Sundarrajan	
1991	Vaidehi Kalyanam	Pachamuthu	
1991	Oorellam Un Paattu		
1991	Thambi Oorukku Pudhusu		
1991	Vasanthakala Paravai	Ravi's friend's uncle	
1991	Kizhakku Karai	Raja (Jacky)	
1991	Bramma	Valayapalayam Chinnasamy	
1991	Nallathai Naadu Kekum	A police officer who disguises himself as a ghost	
1991	Thalattu Ketkuthamma	Rasaiya's uncle	
1991	Nenjamundu Nermaiyundu		
1991	Pondatti Sonna Kettukanum	Dharmalingam	
1992	Mannan	Muthu	
1992	Chinna Gounder	Vellai	
1992	Pandithurai	Mayilsamy	
1992	Rickshaw Mama	Govinthasamy	
1992	Thilagam	Singamuthu	
1992	Ilavarasan	Kung Fu Master	
1992	Chinna Thayye		
1992	Periya Gounder Ponnu	Palanisamy	
1992	Sivantha Malar	Police constable	
1992	Thanga Manasukkaran	Guitarist	
1992	Singaravelan	Drums Mani	
1992	Therku Theru Machan		
1992	Chinnavar		
1992	Chinna Pasanga Naanga	'Kuwait' Govind	
1992	Oor Mariyadhai	'Miner' Mahadevan	
1992	Idhuthanda Sattam	Karuppan	
1992	Aavarampoo	Chellappa Aasari	
1992	Thaali Kattiya Raasa		
1992	Magudam	Thanni Samy	
1992	Pattathu Raani	Jalagandeswaran	
1992	Suriyan	Pannikutty Ramasamy	
1992	Mappillai Vanthachu		
1992	Pangali	Mani	
1992	Samundi	Muthu	
1992	David Uncle	Kavundar	
1992	Senthamizh Paattu	Murugesan	
1992	Thirumathi Palanisamy	Dhandapani	
1992	Onna Irukka Kathukanum	Sudalai	
1992	Villu Pattukaran	Appakannu	
1992	Natchathira Nayagan	'Detective' Thiruvasagam	
1993	Koyil Kaalai	Ilaneer Businessman	
1993	Walter Vetrivel	'Royal' Ramasamy	
1993	Rakkayi Koyil	Singaram	
1993	Manikuyil		
1993	Ejamaan	Vellaiyangiri	
1993	Maharasan	Govindan	
1993	Amma Ponnu		
1993	Uthama Raasa	Ondippulithevar	
1993	Ponnumani	Naachi	
1993	Porantha Veeda Puguntha Veeda	Ravi's Father	
1993	Uzhaippali	P. A. of Lawyer	
1993	Band Master	Mani	
1993	Dharma Seelan	Aarusamy	
1993	Gentleman	Mani	
1993	Udan Pirappu	'White Rice' Vellasamy	
1993	Thalattu	Goundar	
1993	I Love India	Diwakar's uncle	
1993	Dhuruva Natchathiram		
1993	Chinna Jameen	Thalaiyari Mama	
1993	Kattabomman	'Supervisor' Subramani	
1993	Rojavai Killathe	Devit Lorry Driver	
1994	Sethupathi IPS	Muthaiya	
1994	Rajakumaran	Marusamy	
1994	Aranmanai Kaavalan	Thangamani	
1994	Varavu Ettana Selavu Pathana	'Anjatha Singam' Marugupandi	
1994	Seeman	Dawali	
1994	Vandicholai Chinraasu	Kittu	
1994	Jai Hind	Kottaisamy	
1994	Rasigan	Ekambaram	
1994	Mettupatti Mirasu	Gounder	
1994	Vietnam Colony	Joseph	
1994	Sadhu	'Anjukolai' Aarumugam	
1994	Sathyavan	Kiruba	
1994	Thai Maaman	Rasappan's uncle	
1994	Jallikattu Kaalai	Aarusamy	
1994	Nattamai	Pangali / Pangali's mom	
1994	Periya Marudhu	Sudalai	
1994	Nila		
1994	Thaai Manasu	Chokkalingam	
1995	Naan Petha Magane	K. D. Varadarajan	
1995	Veluchami	Kathavarayan	
1995	Muthu Kaalai	Pattayakarar	
1995	Muthukulikka Vaariyala	Kondakara Annachi	
1995	Raja Enga Raja	Raja	
1995	Coolie	Periyasamy / Velusamy / Madasamy	
1995	Karnaa	Nayak	
1995	Lucky Man	Yamadharmarajan	
1995	Chinna Vathiyar	Astrologer	
1995	Murai Maman	Perusu (Sirasu's elder brother)	
1995	Villadhi Villain	Mani	
1995	Thamizhachi	Villangam	
1995	Marumagan	Govindsamy	
1995	Thedi Vandha Raasa	Albert Kothandam	
1995	Chakravarthy	Chinnappa	
1995	Nadodi Mannan	Ponnusamy	
1995	Periya Kudumbam	Post Master	
1995	Mr. Madras	Govindsamy	
1995	Ilavarasi	Gaja	
1995	Ragasiya Police	Ponnurangam	
1995	Maa Manithan	Mr. Dinar / Vettiyan	
1995	Ayudha Poojai	Kanthasamy	
1995	Maaman Magal	Manikkam	
1995	Murai Mappillai	Ramesh	
1995	Mannai Thottu Kumbidanum	Desingu	
1996	Coimbatore Mappillai	Gopal	
1996	Parambarai	Karuppusamy	
1996	Ullathai Allitha	Great Vasu	
1996	Mahaprabhu	Sethu	
1996	Nattupura Pattu	Kattamuthu	
1996	Musthaffaa	Chellappa	
1996	Indian	Subbaiah	
1996	Pudhu Nilavu	Taxi Driver	
1996	Katta Panchayathu	Toddy man	
1996	Avathara Purushan	'Pickpocket' Periyasamy	
1996	En Aasai Thangachi		
1996	Poovarasan	Govind	
1996	Mettukudi	Kalingarayan	
1996	Parivattam		
1996	Tata Birla	Ranjith	
1996	Senathipathi	Kathavarayan	
1996	Gnanapazham	Aarthi's brother	
1997	Periya Thambi	Azhagu Sundaram	
1997	Nesam	Muthuvel Arunachalam	
1997	Pudhayal		
1997	Mannava	Raghupathy	
1997	Vallal	Sithappu	
1997	Sishya	Police inspector Malachamy	
1997	Periya Idathu Mappillai	Kaali	
1997	Aahaa Enna Porutham		
1997	Thedinen Vanthathu	Tamizhmani / 'Pollachi' Ponnusamy	
1997	Janakiraman		
1997	Rettai Jadai Vayasu	Vijay's uncle	
1998	Aval Varuvala	Dhandapani	
1998	Thayin Manikodi	'Silverspoon' Shilpakumar	
1998	En Uyir Nee Thaane	'Bullet' Jackie	
1998	Bhagavath Singh		
1999	Suriya Paarvai	Raj Bharath / Nattamai	
1999	Ponnu Veetukkaran	Ekambaram	
1999	Ethirum Pudhirum	Auto Driver	
1999	Kadhalar Dhinam	Professor Jack	
1999	Malabar Police	Govindrajan (Govindo)	
1999	Unakkaga Ellam Unakkaga	Kundalakesi	
1999	Azhagarsamy		

=== 2000s ===
List of Goundamani 2000s film credits
Year	Title	Role	Notes
2000	Veeranadai	Ulagavaayan	
2000	Kannan Varuvaan	Thannirmalai/Athiyapatham/Ezhumalai	
2000	Kannaal Pesavaa	Clinton	
2001	Kunguma Pottu Gounder	Chinnasamy	
2001	Vedham	Govindsamy	
2001	Samuthiram	Ramanathan	
2001	Azhagana Naatkal	Ranjith	
2002	Baba	Annamalai	
2002	Samasthanam	Selvam	
2003	Chokka Thangam	Muthu's uncle	
2003	Yes Madam	Ganesh Kumar	
2003	Parasuram	Sub-Inspector Thangaraj	
2004	Manmadhan	'Puncture' Pandi	
2006	Suyetchai MLA	Visky	
2008	Thangam	Kalai	

=== 2010s ===
List of Goundamani 2010s film credits
Year	Title	Role	Notes
2010	Jaggubhai	MIB alias Kalaniyappan	
2010	Pollachi Mappillai	Chellapatta	
2015	49-O	Sowrirajaperumal (Sowri)	
2016	Enakku Veru Engum Kilaigal Kidayathu	Caravan Krishnan	
2016	Vaaimai	Benny	

=== 2020s ===
List of Goundamani 2020s film credits
Year	Title	Role	Notes
2025	Otha Votu Muthaiya	Muthaiya	
