= Nadodi Mannan (1995 film) =

- Title card
- Directed by: Manivasagam
- Written by: Manivasagam; K. C. Thangam (dialogues)
- Produced by: Rajeswari Manivasagam
- Starring: R. Sarathkumar; Meena
- Cinematography: K. B. Dhayalan
- Edited by: P. Mohanraj
- Music by: Deva
- Production company: Raja Pushpa Pictures
- Release date: 19 August 1995
- Running time: 150 minutes
- Country: India
- Language: Tamil

Nadodi Mannan (transl. The Vagabond King) is a 1995 Indian Tamil-language drama film directed by Manivasagam. The film stars R. Sarathkumar and Meena. It was released on 19 August 1995, and failed at the box office.

== Plot ==
Ram Sundar, also known as Ramu, is a rich businessman and he is married to Meenakshi. They have an arrogant daughter Priya. Ramesh, a graduate who works as a car driver, falls in love with Priya and lies to her that he is a rich man. They eventually fall in love until Priya knows the truth. Ramu tries to reason with her and tells his daughter about his past.

In the past, Meenakshi was the daughter of a rich businessman while Ramu repaired slippers in the street with his friend Ponnusamy. One day, Ramu saved Meenakshi from goons and Meenakshi fell in love with him. Ponnusamy and Meenakshi made a plan to seduce Ramu. Under the name of Mayil Aatha, Meenakshi finally won Ramu's heart and he reciprocated her love. Meenakshi's father didn't approve of the marriage, so Meenakshi rejected her rich life and she married Ramu. Thereafter, Ramu worked hard and he became one of the richest men in India.

Priya understands that money is not the only measure of success in life. Afterwards, Ramu clashes with Krishnamoorthy, an influential man.

== Cast ==
- R. Sarathkumar as Ramu (Ram Sundar)
- Meena as Meenakshi and Priya
- Raghuvaran as Krishnamoorthy
- Goundamani as Ponnusamy
- Senthil
- Vignesh as Ramesh
- Alphonsa as Dilruba
- Lalitha Kumari as Kuyil Aatha
- Vennira Aadai Moorthy
- Kitty as the Governor of Tamil Nadu
- Suryakanth
- Oru Viral Krishna Rao
- Chandrasekhar
- Raviraj
- Tiruppur Ramasamy as Ramesh's uncle

== Soundtrack ==
The music was composed by Deva, with lyrics written by Kalidasan.

Song	Singer(s)	Duration
"Housing Board"	Mano, Swarnalatha	5:11
"Mana Madurai"	Mano, S. Janaki	4:55
"Thenkizhakku"	S. P. Balasubrahmanyam, K. S. Chithra	5:06
"Thiri Ak Kehni"	Mano, Swarnalatha	5:16
"Vazhum Bumi"	S. P. Balasubrahmanyam	5:09

== Reception ==
R. P. R. of Kalki called the film showcasing the political ambitions of Sarathkumar while criticising the screenplay as slow like an art film. D. S. Ramanujam of The Hindu wrote, "Director M. Manivachagam gives the wanted boost despite a few flaws, through his screenplay, the dialogue of K. C. Thangam providing the wanted fervour."
