= List of songs recorded by Swarnalatha =

Swarnalatha (29 April 1973 – 12 September 2010) was an Indian playback singer. She recorded over 6,000 songs in 10 Indian languages including Tamil, Telugu, Malayalam, Kannada, Hindi, Bengali and other languages.

Swarnalatha's career began with the film Neethikku Thandanai (1987) which had music by M. S. Viswanathan. There after, she recorded many hundreds of songs for composers such as Ilaiyaraaja, A. R. Rahman, Mani Sharma, Koti, Deva, Vidyasagar, Hamsalekha and others. She received the National Film Award for Best Female Playback Singer for the song "Poraale Ponnuthayi" from the film Karuthamma (1994). She has sung more than 300 songs for Ilaiyaraaja and more than 100 songs for Vandemataram Srinivas.

== Tamil film songs ==
=== 1980s ===
Year	Film	Song	Composer(s)	Writer(s)	Co-artist(s)
1987	Neethikku Thandanai	"Chinnanchiru Kiliye"	M. S. Viswanathan		
1988	Guru Sishyan	"Uthama Puthiri"	Ilaiyaraaja		
1988	Dhayam Onnu	"Nane Un Kathali"	Ilaiyaraaja		
1988	Rayilukku Neramachu	"Poralae Ponnuthayi"	S.A. Rajkumar		
1988	Paravaigal Palavitham	"Manam Padida"	S.A. Rajkumar		

=== 1990s ===
Year	Film	Song	Composer(s)	Writer(s)	Co-artist(s)
1990	Chatriyan	"Maalayil Yaaro"	Ilaiyaraaja		
1990	Puriyaadha Pudhir	"Kannoram Gangai"	S. A. Rajkumar		
1990	Nila Pennae	"Otha Kuyilu"	Vidyasagar		
1991	Vaigasi Poranthachu	"Kanne Karisal"	Deva		
1991	Dharma Durai	"Maasi Maasam"	Ilaiyaraaja		K.J. Yesudas
1991	Chinna Thambi	"Poovoma Oorgolam"	Ilaiyaraaja		S.P. Balasubrahmanyam
1991	Chinna Thambi	"Nee Engae En Anbe"	Ilaiyaraaja		
1991	En Rasavin Manasile	"Kuyil Paattu"(Happy)	Ilaiyaraaja		
1991	En Rasavin Manasile	"Kuyil Paattu (Sad)"	Ilaiyaraaja		
1991	Adhikari	"Purushan Veettil"	Gangai Amaran		
1991	Adhikari	"Veetula Yaarumilla"	Gangai Amaran		
1991	Captain Prabhakaran	"Aattama Therottama"	Ilaiyaraaja		
1991	Aatha Un Koyilile	"Vandi Varuthu"	Deva		
1991	Aatha Un Koyilile	"Thaimaasam Vanthiruchi"	Deva		
1991	Aatha Un Koyilile	"Maari Muthumaari"	Deva		
1991	Cheran Pandiyan	"Kadhal Kaditham"	Soundaryan		
1991	Cheran Pandiyan	"Samba Naathu"	Soundaryan		
1991	Vaaku Moolam	"Kanakku Paadam"	Shankar–Ganesh		Mano
1991	Ayul Kaithi	"Kathazha Kaadu"	Shankar–Ganesh		
1991	Malai Chaaral	"Laa Laa"	M S Murari		
1991	Malai Chaaral	"Aa Aa"	M S Murari		
1991	Oorellam Un Pattu	"Oorellam Un Paattu"(Female)	Ilaiyaraaja		
1991	MGR Nagaril	"Masai Matham"	S. Balakrishnan		
1991	Thambikku Oru Paattu	"Thai Maatham"	Ilaiyaraaja		
1991	Thambikku Oru Paattu	"Muththu Muththu"	Ilaiyaraaja		
1991	Vaasalil Oru Vennila	"Ullasa Sorgam"	Deva		
1991	Vaasalil Oru Vennila	"Nethuvachcha"	Deva		
1991	En Pottukku Sonthakkaran	"Manasonnu Thudikkuthu"	Deva		
1991	Thalapathi	"Rakkamma Kaiya Thattu"	Ilaiyaraaja		S.P. Balasubrahmanyam
1991	Thalapathi	"Margazhithan"	Ilaiyaraaja		
1991	Thangamana Thangachi	"Vaaya Katti Vayatha Katti"	Sankar Ganesh		
1991	Aadi Viratham	"Aadi Velli Puthukku"	Sankar Ganesh		K. S. Chithra & M. S. Rajeswari
1991	Aadi Viratham	"Pattai Urikkiran Pachai"	Sankar Ganesh		
1991	Thoodhu Poo Chellakiliye	"Vaala Kamaripulla"	Deva		
1991	Thambi Orukku Pudhusa	"Manamadurai Mallitheru"	Deva		
1991	Thambi Orukku Pudhusa	"Aathadi Nammaku"	Deva		
1992	Brahmachari	"Heartu Beatu"	Deva		
1992	Brahmachari	"Thenkasi Thenai"	Deva		
1992	Mannan	"Rajathi Raja"	Ilaiyaraaja		
1992	Pandithurai	"Kaana Karunkuyil"	Ilaiyaraaja		
1992	Pandithurai	"Malliye Chinna"	Ilaiyaraaja		Mano
1992	Rickshaw Mama	"Yeh Pattu Pottachu"	Ilaiyaraaja		
1992	Chinna Thayee	"Naan Erikarai"	Ilaiyaraaja		K.J. Yesudas
1992	Agni Paarvai	"Ethana Raathiri"	Ilaiyaraaja		
1992	Thambi Pondatti	"Eyru Mayil Eri"	Ilaiyaraaja		K.S. Chithra and Kalpana
1992	Periya Gounder Ponnu	"Kottampatti"	Deva		
1992	Government Mappillai	"Oru Veppamara Thoppu"	Deva		
1992	Naangal	"Paaradi Kuyile"(Female)	Ilaiyaraaja		
1992	Unna Nenachen Pattu Padichen	"Ennai Thottu"	Ilaiyaraaja		S.P. Balasubrahmanyam
1992	Unna Nenachen Pattu Padichen	"Kanna Un Kannil"	Ilaiyaraaja		
1992	Senbaga Thottam	"Otha Nelavelaku"	Sirpy		
1992	Senbaga Thottam	"Muthu Muthu"(Happy)	Sirpy		
1992	Chinnavar	"Andhiyile Vaanam"	Ilaiyaraaja		Mano
1992	Oor Mariyadhai	"Palapalanguthu Thalathalanguthu"	Deva		
1992	Nadodi Pattukkaran	"Kadhalukku Kangalillai"	Ilaiyaraaja		S.P. Balasubrahmanyam
1992	Nadodi Pattukkaran	"Sithirathu There Vaa"	Ilaiyaraaja		
1992	Unakkaga Piranthen	"Maama Maama Unai"	Deva		
1992	Pokkiri Thambi	"Yei Mannula Urundu"	Deva		
1992	Thilakam	"Kavali Adutthathu"	Chandrabose		
1992	Thilakam	"Ennanga Kaundaru"	Chandrabose		
1992	Idhu Namma Bhoomi	"Aaradi Chuvaru Thaan"	Ilaiyaraaja		K.J. Yesudas
1992	Idhu Namma Bhoomi	"Oru Pokiri Rathiri"	Ilaiyaraaja		
1992	Idhu Namma Bhoomi	"Kuruvi Pudicha"	Ilaiyaraaja		
1992	Kizhakku Velathachu	"Kundu Malli Poothachu"	Deva		
1992	Amma Vandhachu	"Nandini Oh Nandini"	Deva		
1992	Ponnuketha Purushan	"Paal Ninaithoothum"	Ilaiyaraaja		
1992	Ponnuketha Purushan	"Devathai Vanthaal"	Ilaiyaraaja		
1992	Ponnuketha Purushan	"Duraina Durai"	Ilaiyaraaja		
1992	Vaa Vaa Vasanthame	"Pothumma"	Ilaiyaraaja		
1992	Kalikaalam	"Kadhal Illamal"	Ilaiyaraaja		
1992	Kalikaalam	"Meendum Vandhadho"	Ilaiyaraaja		
1992	Magudam	"Indha Mamavukku"	Ilaiyaraaja		
1992	Muthal Seethanam	"Sutha Samba"	Soundaryan		
1992	Urimai Oonjaladugiradhu	"Nootrakku Nooru"	Shankar–Ganesh		
1992	Mouna Mozhi	"Kaadhal Oru Vedham"	Deva		
1992	Thai Mozhi	"Singara Maane"	Ilaiyaraaja		
1992	Mappillai Vanthachu	"Arugamani Karugamani"	Ilaiyaraaja		
1992	Matha Gomatha	"Vilakke Thiruvilakke"	Shankar–Ganesh		
1992	Matha Gomatha	"Vellimani Sangu Onnu"	Shankar–Ganesh		
1992	Matha Gomatha	"Ponmagale Engal Komadha"	Shankar–Ganesh		
1992	Matha Gomatha	"Bathira Kaali Ruthira Kaali"	Shankar–Ganesh		
1992	Matha Gomatha	"Bannari Ammanum"	Shankar–Ganesh		
1992	Annai Vayal	"Poove Vanna Poove"	Sirpy		
1992	Chinna Chittu	"Poo Pookum Nandhavanam"	Devendran		
1992	David Uncle	"Thottutaa"	Adithyan		
1992	David Uncle	"Vaaya Soodu Erudu"	Adithyan		
1992	Kaviya Thalaivan	"Aadivarum Kottai"	Aravind Siddhartha		
1992	Kaviya Thalaivan	"Sandhana Malargalai"	Aravind Siddhartha		
1992	Mangala Nayagan	"Poove Ilam Poove"	S. A. Rajkumar		
1992	Sathiyam Adhu Nichayam	"Ammaadi"	Shankar–Ganesh		
1992	Senthamizh Paattu	"Kalayil Kettathu"	M. S. Viswanathan; Ilaiyaraaja		S.P. Balasubrahmanyam
1992	Thevar Magan	"Manamagale Manamagale"	Ilaiyaraaja		Minmini
1992	Thevar Magan	"Masaru Ponne Varuga"	Ilaiyaraaja		
1992	Onna Irukka Kathukanum	"Kaathaluna Unga Veettu"	Ilaiyaraaja		
1992	Neenga Nalla Irukkanum	"Aalagi"	M. S. Viswanathan		
1992	Deiva Kuzhanthai	"Chinna Kaa Sirikkum Kaa"	Shankar–Ganesh		
1992	Harihara Puthiran	"Swamiku Swamiya"	Shankar–Ganesh		
1992	Natchathira Nayagan	"Neela Malai Kattukullae"	Deva		
1992	Natchathira Nayagan	"Vennila"	Deva		
1992	Thoorathu Sontham	"Thavani Thavani"	Kavi Rajan		
1992	China Devan	"Chithira Kili"	Ilaiyaraaja		
1992	Sivasangkari	"Mama Mama Naanthane Nagamma"	Shankar–Ganesh		M. S. Rajeswari
1992	Sivasangkari	"Amaadi Abiraami Nalla Vazhi Nee Kaami"	Shankar–Ganesh		M. S. Rajeswari
1993	Aadhityan	"Kottattum Mela Sattham"	Gangai Amaran		
1993	Aadhityan	"Kanna Kadhal Kannukku"	Gangai Amaran		
1993	Chinna Mapillai	"Vennilavu Kothipathana"	Ilaiyaraaja		
1993	Chinna Mapillai	"Kattu Kuyil Pattu"	Ilaiyaraaja		Mano
1993	Walter Vetrivel	"Ovvoru Pakkam"	Ilaiyaraaja		
1993	Chinna Kannamma	"Sithaadai Theney"	Ilaiyaraaja		
1993	Dasarathan	"Chinnu Ponnu"	L. Vaidyanathan		
1993	Pudhu Vayal	"Pudhu Vayal"	Aravind		
1993	Malare Kurunji Malare	"Kaaman Kadhai Padikkum"	Raveendran		
1993	Malare Kurunji Malare	"Aathoram Thoppukuruvi"	Raveendran		
1993	Malare Kurunji Malare	"Kadhal Paingili Inba"	Raveendran		
1993	Aranmanai Kili	"Amman Kovil"	Ilaiyaraaja		Minmini
1993	Madhumathi	"Vala Veesamma Vala"	Deva		
1993	Thangakkili	"Naan Deva Devi"	Ilaiyaraaja		
1993	Gokulam	"Chittada Rakkai"	Sirpy		
1993	Gokulam	"Naane Madai Mele"	Sirpy		
1993	Gokulam	"Puthu Roja Puthirichu"	Sirpy		Mano
1993	Rajadhi Raja Raja Kulothunga Raja Marthanda Raja Gambeera Kathavaraya Krishna Kamarajan	"Maama Maama"	Mansoor Ali Khan		
1993	Band Master	"Putham Puthu"	Deva		
1993	Naan Pesa Ninaipathellam	"A for Ambika"	Sirpy		Mano
1993	Dharma Seelan	"Anbe Vaa"	Ilaiyaraaja		
1993	Dharma Seelan	"Kadhal Nilave"	Ilaiyaraaja		
1993	Gentleman	"Usilampatti Penkutti"	A. R. Rahman		Sahul Hameed
1993	Udan Pirappu	"Nandri Sollave Unakku"	Ilaiyaraaja		S.P. Balasubrahmanyam
1993	Valli	"Ennulle Ennulle"	Ilaiyaraaja		
1993	Poranthalum Ambalaiya Porakka Koodathu	"Pothathu Pothathu"	Bala Bharathi		
1993	Karpagam Vanthachu	"Ponnu Ninaichal"	Sankar Ganesh		
1993	Karpagam Vanthachu	"Naan Than Di"	Sankar Ganesh		
1993	Karpagam Vanthachu	"Muruga Vel Muruga"	Sankar Ganesh		
1993	Chinna Jameen	"Adi Vannathi Poo"	Ilaiyaraaja		
1993	Chinna Jameen	"Onappu Thottu"	Ilaiyaraaja		
1993	Enga Muthalali	"Kolli Malli"	Ilaiyaraaja		
1993	Kattabomman	"Enga Then Pandi"	Deva		
1993	Muthupandi	"Sakkara Pongalithu"	Deva		
1993	Muthupandi	"Urumi Melam"	Deva		
1993	Puthiya Thendral	"O Paravaigale"	Ravi		
1993	Uzhavan	"Raakozhi Rendum"	A. R. Rahman		K.J. Yesudas
1993	Rojavai Killathe	"Moodiko Moodiko"	Deva		
1993	Rojavai Killathe	"Onnachi Rendaachi"	Deva		
1993	Senthoorapandi	"Chinna Chinna"	Deva		Mano
1993	Senthoorapandi	"Maane Naane"	Deva		
1994	Amaidhi Padai	"Sollividu Velli Nilave"	Ilaiyaraaja		Mano
1994	Amaidhi Padai	"Enakku Unna Nanaicha"	Ilaiyaraaja		
1994	Sindhu Nathi Poo	"Mathalam Koothudadi"	Soundaryan		
1994	Siragadikka Aasai	"Rani Vani"	Manoj–Gyan		
1994	Vaanga Partner Vaanga	"Paatirukkudhu"	Shankar–Ganesh		
1994	Veetla Visheshanga	"Jigan Jinakku"	Ilaiyaraaja		
1994	Captain	"Kannil Aadum Roja"	Sirpy		
1994	Pondattiye Deivam	"Ambala Nerula"	Bala Bharathi		
1994	En Rajangam	"Padikka Vanthathu"	Deva		
1994	Honest Raj	"Izhuthu Pothina"	Ilaiyaraaja		
1994	Sakthivel	"Malliga Mottu"	Ilaiyaraaja		Arunmozhi
1994	Veera	"Malai Kovil Vasalil"	Ilaiyaraaja		Mano
1994	Veera	"Madathile Kanni Madathile"	Ilaiyaraaja		S.P. Balasubrahmanyam
1994	Vandicholai Chinraasu	"Kattu Panamaram Pola"	A. R. Rahman		
1994	Vaa Magale Vaa	"Neela Vizhi"	Deva		
1994	Namma Annachi	"Varaaru Varaaru"	Deva		
1994	Priyanka	"Vettukkili"	Ilaiyaraaja		
1994	Sevatha Ponnu	"Color Color Kanavugal"	Deva		
1994	Sevatha Ponnu	"Vatta Pottu"	Deva		
1994	Manasu Rendum Pudhusu	"Mylapore Maami"	Deva		
1994	Seevalaperi Pandi	"Aruvi Onnu Kulikudhu"	Adithyan		
1994	Rasigan	"Sillena Sillena"	Deva		
1994	Rasigan	"Auto Rani"	Deva		
1994	Chinna Madam	"Kora Kizhangukku"	Sirpy		
1994	Vietnam Colony	"Margazhi Maasam"	Ilaiyaraaja		
1994	Vietnam Colony	"Enakku Ullathellam"	Ilaiyaraaja		
1994	Vietnam Colony	"Yennamo Solla"	Ilaiyaraaja		
1994	Sadhu	"Padikirom"	Ilaiyaraaja		
1994	Sadhu	"Vitta Moochile"	Ilaiyaraaja		
1994	Sevvanthi	"Punnaivana Poonguyil"	Ilaiyaraaja		
1994	Sevvanthi	"Ponnatam Poovattam"	Ilaiyaraaja		
1994	Kanmani	"Oh En Deva Deviye"	Ilaiyaraaja		
1994	Senthamizh Selvan	"Machan Ennai"	M. S. Viswanathan		
1994	Thozhar Pandian	"Kattaaya Kadhal"	Ilaiyaraaja		
1994	Thamarai	"Madurai Veeran"	Deva		
1994	Killadi Mappillai	"Emma Emma"	Deva		
1994	May Madham	"Madrasa Suthi"	A. R. Rahman		Manorama
1994	Raja Pandi	"Chithrai Masthula"	Deva		
1994	Mudhal Payanam	"Metukkale Metukkale"	Ravi Devendran		
1994	Mudhal Payanam	"Ey Sikicha"	Ravi Devendran		
1994	Veeramani	"Akkam pakkam Ullavuvanga	Ekandhan		
1994	Kaadhalan	"Mukkabla"	A. R. Rahman	Vaali	Mano
1994	Pudhusa Pootha Rosa	"Manmatharae"	S. A. Rajkumar		
1994	Ulavaali	"Chikku Chikku"	Sirpy		
1994	Thendral Varum Theru	"Pudhiya Paravai"	Ilaiyaraaja		
1994	Jallikattu Kaalai	"Annakkili"	Deva		
1994	Mani Rathnam	"Adi Aathi"	Sirpy		
1994	Nammavar	"Sorgam Enbadhu Nammakku"	Mahesh Mahadevan		
1994	Nammavar	"Ethilum Valvlan Da"	Mahesh Mahadevan		
1994	Pavithra	"Mottu Vithada"	A. R. Rahman		
1994	Periya Marudhu	"Vidala Pulla"	Ilaiyaraaja		
1994	Karuththamma	"Porale Ponnuthayi"	A. R. Rahman		
1994	Nila	"Mele Idi Idikkum"	Deva		
1994	Pandiyanin Rajyathil	"Manmadha Leelai"	Deva		
1994	Chinna Pulla	"Paadu Paadu"	Adithyan		
1994	Vanaja Girija	"Siragadikkudhu"	Ilaiyaraaja		
1994	Vanaja Girija	"Unnai Ethirparthen"	Ilaiyaraaja		
1995	Karuppu Nila	"Pallakku"	Deva		
1995	Engirundho Vandhan	"Andha Sriraman"	Viswanathan–Ramamoorthy		
1995	Baashha	"Ra Raa Raamayya"	Deva		S.P. Balasubrahmanyam
1995	Oru Oorla Oru Rajakumari	"Kanmani Kadhal"	Ilaiyaraaja		Mano
1995	Oru Oorla Oru Rajakumari	"Vandhal Vandhal"	Ilaiyaraaja		
1995	Veluchami	"Chinnamma Enga"	Deva		
1995	Veluchami	"Uyire Uyire"	Deva		
1995	Veluchami	"Monica Monica"	Deva		
1995	Rangeela	“ Hai Rama"	A. R. Rahman		Hariharan
1995	Valli Vara Pora	"Jinggu Jangu"	Mani Oli		
1995	Deva	"Kothagiri Kuppamma"	Deva		
1995	Bombay	"Hamma Hamma"	A. R. Rahman		A.R. Rahman & Suresh Peters
1995	Bombay	"Kuchi Kuchi Rakamma"	A. R. Rahman		Hariharan
1995	Aanazhagan	"Kannae Indru"	Ilaiyaraaja		
1995	Aanazhagan	"Nillatha Vennila"	Ilaiyaraaja		
1995	Aanazhagan	"Poo Choodum"	Ilaiyaraaja		
1995	Coolie	"Poo Poova"	Suresh Peters		S.P. Balasubrahmanyam
1995	Coolie	"Raja Raja"	Suresh Peters		
1995	En Pondatti Nallava	"Maari Manasu"	Deva		
1995	Karnaa	"Ai Shabba"	Vidyasagar		Mano
1995	Karnaa	"Hello Miss Chellamma"	Vidyasagar		
1995	Padikkara Vayasula	"Ammaadi Ammaadi"	Sirpy		
1995	Pasumpon	"Aelele Aelele"	Vidyasagar		
1995	Pasumpon	"Marudhani Vechu"	Vidyasagar		
1995	Thai Thangai Paasam	"Hey Muniyamma"	T. Rajendar		
1995	Indira	"Munnerudhaan"	A. R. Rahman		
1995	Nandhavana Theru	"Anniya Kaattu"	Ilaiyaraaja		
1995	Chellakannu	"Rakku Muthu"	Deva		
1995	Chellakannu	"Vandiyile"	Deva		
1995	Murai Maman	"Kangalai Thottuvitten"	Vidyasagar		
1995	Murai Maman	"Yennachi Yennachi"	Vidyasagar		
1995	Rani Maharani	"Adichen Da Naatu Sarakku"	Deva		
1995	Villadhi Villain	"Theemthalakadi"	Vidyasagar		
1995	Villadhi Villain	"Vayaso Pathikichi"	Vidyasagar		
1995	Thamizhachi	"Kokku Parakkuthadi"	Deva		
1995	Marumagan	"Manjula Manjula"	Deva		
1995	Pullakuttikaran	"Mukalana"	Deva		
1995	Paattu Vaathiyar	"Neethane Naaldhorum"	Ilaiyaraaja		K.J. Yesudas
1995	Vishnu	"Aajare Meri"	Deva		
1995	Nadodi Mannan	"Housing Board"	Deva		
1995	Nadodi Mannan	"Thiri Ak Kheni"	Deva		
1995	Aasai	"Thilothhama"	Deva		S.P. Balasubrahmanyam
1995	Mr. Madras	"Unnai Parthathum"	Vidyasagar		
1995	Mr. Madras	"Pala Naadu Parkuthu"	Vidyasagar		
1995	Mannukku Mariyadhai	"Aathi Sakthi"	Devadevan		
1995	Thaikulame Thaikulame	"Nepala Malai Oram"	Deva		Mano
1995	Thaikulame Thaikulame	"Oru Vatta Nilavu"	Deva		
1995	Ilavarasi	"Kotta Thiranthiruch"	Deva		
1995	Chandralekha	"Adikkadi Thudikkum"	Ilaiyaraaja		
1995	Makkal Aatchi	"Kathavukku Kathavu"	Ilaiyaraaja		
1995	Makkal Aatchi	"Nam Naadu"	Ilaiyaraaja		
1995	Neela Kuyil	"Oru Vanambadithaan"	Manikka Vinayagam		
1995	Neela Kuyil	"Yar Nenjilea"	Manikka Vinayagam		
1995	Ragasiya Police	"Kann Imaikkamal"	Laxmikant–Pyarelal		
1995	Maamanithan	"Indruthan Puthiyatho"	Soundaryan		
1995	Ayudha Poojai	"Ennaiya Vechu"	Vidyasagar		
1995	Jameen Kottai	"Thennamara cholai"	Sirpy		
1995	Murai Mappillai	"Sikkunu Mutham"	Swaraj		
1995	Mannai Thottu Kumbidanum	"Eppo Maama Kacheri"	Deva		
1995	Mannai Thottu Kumbidanum	"Seethatin Kaiyai Thotta"	Deva		
1995	Dear Son Maruthu	"Malaikaatru"	Deva		
1996	Aruva Velu	"Maruthaye Ninaichu"	Adithyan		
1996	Coimbatore Mappillai	"Annamalai Deepam"	Vidyasagar		S.P Balasubrahmanyam
1996	Vaanmathi	"Arunachalam"	Deva		
1996	Mahaprabhu	"Missy Missy Doll"	Deva		
1996	Amman Kovil Vaasalile	"Un Malliyappo"	Sirpy		
1996	Amman Kovil Vaasalile	"Vanthal Puguntha"	Sirpy		
1996	Musthaffaa	"Vaya Mappillai"	Vidyasagar		
1996	Musthaffaa	"Kadhalar Mattum"	Vidyasagar		
1996	Kalloori Vaasal	"Neelagiri"	Deva		
1996	Puthiya Parasakthi	"Kizhakku Veluthu"	Deva		
1996	Vasantha Vaasal	"Aadi Kulugum"	Maasi		
1996	Maanbumigu Maanavan	"Poori Poori"	Deva		
1996	Karuppu Roja	"Thottu Vidava Naan"	M S V Raja		
1996	Sengottai	"Vinnum Mannum"	Deva		
1996	Indian	"Akkadanu Nanga"	A. R. Rahman		
1996	Indian	"Maya Machindra"	A. R. Rahman		S.P Balasubrahmanyam
1996	Aavathum Pennale Azhivathum Pennale	"Nillu Nillu"	Bala Bharathi		
1996	Pudhu Nilavu	"Naughty Girl"	Deva		
1996	Pudhu Nilavu	"Saela Onnu Kattil"	Deva		
1996	Anthimanthaarai	"Oru Naal Oru Pozhudu"	A. R. Rahman		
1996	Avathara Purushan	"Mathithala"	Sirpy		
1996	Veettukulle Thiruvizha	"Athai Sutta"	Deva		
1996	Veettukulle Thiruvizha	"Rasa Unne Ravikkayin"	Deva		
1996	Veettukulle Thiruvizha	"Dheivanai Anbu"	Deva		
1996	Kadhal Kottai	"Mottu Mottu Malaradha"	Deva	Agathiyan	P. Unnikrishnan
1996	Sundara Purushan	"Setupa Mathi"	Sirpy		
1996	En Aasai Thangachi	"Indhaa Idukaa"	T. Rajendar		
1996	Tamizh Selvan	"Rajasthanu Puli Mannu"	Deva		
1996	Tamizh Selvan	"Rendu Rendu"	Deva		
1996	Vetri Mugam	"Vaa Pakkam Vaa"	Vasantha Rajan		
1996	Vetri Mugam	"Oh Pulli Maane"	Vasantha Rajan		
1996	Vetri Mugam	"En Jeevankannil"	Vasantha Rajan		
1996	Priyam	"Thulli Varum"	Vidyasagar		
1996	Vishwanath	"Gongura"	Deva		
1996	Mettukudi	"Anbulla Mannavane"	Sirpy		
1996	Mettukudi	"Mana Madurai"	Sirpy		Mano
1996	Manikkam	"Rakkamma Rakkamma"	Karthik Raja		
1996	Sivasakthi	"Na Dhin Dhinna"	Deva		
1996	Vetri Vinayagar	"Intha Mattukkaran"	M. S. Viswanathan		
1996	Vetri Vinayagar	"Poothathellam"	M. S. Viswanathan		
1996	Subash	"Hey Saloma"	Vidyasagar		
1996	Subash	"Hawala"	Vidyasagar		
1996	Parivattam	"Gundouru Gundumalli"	Deva		
1996	Parivattam	"Paaya Potta Pankajavalli"	Deva		
1996	Tata Birla	"Baava Baava Ushtava"	Vidyasagar		
1996	Tata Birla	"Vedhalam Murungai"	Vidyasagar		
1996	Andha Naal	"Andha Naal"	Soundaryan		
1996	Mr. Romeo	"Mellisayae"	A. R. Rahman		Unnimenon, Srinivas and Sujatha Mohan
1996	Nethaji	"Holey Holey"	Vidyasagar		
1996	Panchalankurichi	"Aasai Vaithen"	Deva		
1996	Senathipathi	"En Idayathai"	Deva		
1996	Vasantham	"Chinna Ponnu Ithu"	Ilaiyaraaja		
1996	Vasantham	"Neeyo Mullai Kodi"	Ilaiyaraaja		
1996	Vasantham	"Paaladai Maaney"	Ilaiyaraaja		
1996	Vasantham	"Saaral Veesuthey"	Ilaiyaraaja		
1996	Vasantham	"Vasanthame"(Happy)	Ilaiyaraaja		
1996	Gnanapazham	"Hey Sayorana"	K. Bhagyaraj		
1996	Gopala Gopala	"Thenkasi Mamanukku"	Deva		
1996	Selva	"Chicken Kari"	Sirpy		Vijay
1996	Selva	"Lappu Tappu"	Sirpy		
1996	Selva	"Tharaiyil Natakkuthu"	Sirpy		
1996	Take It Easy Urvashi	"Oh Urvasiye"	Soundaryan		
1996	Take It Easy Urvashi	"Idhayathil Iruppavale"	Soundaryan		
1997	Sakthi	"Achu Vellame"	R. Anandh		
1997	Sakthi	"Mana Madurai"	R. Anandh		
1997	Nalla Manasukkaran	"Chinna Pandi Then Pandi"	Deva		
1997	Nalla Manasukkaran	"Paattu Padippom"	Deva		
1997	Nalla Manasukkaran	"Pollachi Rottu Mele"	Deva		
1997	Nalla Manasukkaran	"Valaiyal Vaangalayo"	Deva		
1997	Nalla Manasukkaran	"Aayiram Kannatha"	Deva		
1997	Periya Thambi	"Left Right"	Deva		
1997	Periya Thambi	"Poovukku Oru Kalyanam"	Deva		
1997	Periya Thambi	"Vellikizhamai"	Deva		
1997	Bharathi Kannamma	"Naaleluzhthu Padichavare"	Deva		
1997	Ottam	"Shabba Shabba"	A. R. Rahman		
1997	Ottam	"Oh Vanthaale"	A. R. Rahman		
1997	Gopura Deepam	"Maama Yei"	Soundaryan		
1997	Gopura Deepam	"Gangai Kaayum"	Soundaryan		
1997	Gopura Deepam	"Saanja"	Soundaryan		
1997	Nesam	"Madonna Varuvaala"	Deva		
1997	Pudhayal	"Enakkum Unakkum"	Vidyasagar		
1997	Kaalamellam Kadhal Vaazhga	"Vennilave Vennilave"	Deva		S.P. Balasubrahmanyam
1997	Ettupatti Rasa	"Ettupatti Rasa"	Deva		
1997	Ettupatti Rasa	"Merku Seemayilae"	Deva		Nepoleon and Deva
1997	Vaimaye Vellum	"Maaman Parikiran"	Deva		
1997	Mannava	"Thelu Kadichiduchi"	Deva		
1997	Mannava	"Pa Pa Chinna Pappa"	Deva		
1997	Aravindhan	"Thanga Sooriyan"	Yuvan Shankar Raja		
1997	Aravindhan	"Poovattam"	Yuvan Shankar Raja		
1997	Mappillai Gounder	"Ayiram Meen Pidikka"	Deva		Mano
1997	Arunachalam	"Alli Alli Anarkali"	Deva		Mano
1997	Thaali Pudhusu	"Putham Pudhu"	Vidyasagar, Raj		
1997	Thaali Pudhusu	"Pournami Velayile"	Vidyasagar, Raj		
1997	Thaali Pudhusu	"Kaadhal Vizha"	Vidyasagar, Raj		
1997	Dhinamum Ennai Gavani	"Pathikichiyamma Pambara"	Sirpy		
1997	Raasi	"Kathalin Desam"	Sirpy		
1997	Raasi	"Yenadi Yenadi"	Sirpy		
1997	Sishya	"Apollo Apollo"	Deva		
1997	Ullasam	"Mutthe Muthamma"	Karthik Raja		
1997	Ullasam	"Ulasam Ullasam"	Karthik Raja		
1997	Pasamulla Pandiyare	"Veeranthan"	Deva		
1997	Suryavamsam	"Kadhala Kadhala"	S. A. Rajkumar	Palani Bharathi	Hariharan
1997	Nattupura Nayagan	"Vethala Vethala"	S. A. Rajkumar		
1997	Once More	"Ooty Malai Beauty"	Deva		Vijay
1997	Nandhini	"ABCD Pola Naam"	Sirpy		
1997	Kadhal Palli	"Vollan Gothiya"	Deva		
1997	Periya Idathu Mappillai	"Chickk Chickk"	Sirpy		
1997	Adimai Changili	"Sultan Pettai"	Deva		
1997	Adimai Changili	"Oh Laali"	Deva		
1997	Kalyana Vaibhogam	"Roja Poovile"	Deva		
1997	Kalyana Vaibhogam	"Kanang Karuviku"	Deva		
1997	Adrasakkai Adrasakkai	"Hammaea Hammanea"	Deva		
1997	Adrasakkai Adrasakkai	"Adi Oalakudisalelay"	Deva		
1997	Naalaya Udhayam	"Pannagottai"	Aravind		
1997	Naalaya Udhayam	"Poonguyil"	Aravind		
1997	Aahaa Enna Porutham	"Baghdad Perazhage"	Vidyasagar		
1997	Paththini	"Mellathan Solla"	Deva		
1997	Samrat	"Jimbumbaa"	Manoj Saran		
1997	Ratchagan	"Lucky Lucky"	A. R. Rahman		S.P. Balasubrahmanyam and Udit Narayan
1997	Ratchagan	"Mercury Pookkal"	A. R. Rahman		
1997	Thedinen Vanthathu	"Puyaladikkum Neramidhu"	Sirpy		
1997	Thadayam	"Kaadhalane"	Deva		
1997	Arasiyal	"Vaarai En Thozhi"	Vidyasagar		
1997	Rettai Jadai Vayasu	"Angel Engae"	Deva		
1997	Pudhalvan	"Kumari Ponnu"	Deva		
1997	Pudhalvan	"MBBS Naan"	Deva		
1998	Kaadhale Nimmadhi	"Gangai Nathiye"	Deva		
1998	Maru Malarchi	"Rettaikkili"	S. A. Rajkumar		
1998	Ulavuthurai	"Kandu Piditthaya"	Shah		
1998	Uyire	"Poongkaatrile"	A. R. Rahman		
1998	Udhavikku Varalaamaa	"Thottu Thottu"	Sirpy		
1998	Udhavikku Varalaamaa	"Salakku Salakku"	Sirpy		
1998	Kondattam	"Paeru Nalla Paeru"	Maragatha Mani		
1998	Dhinamdhorum	"O Kannukkul"	Oviyan		
1998	Swarnamukhi	"Kammakarai"	Swararaj		
1998	Swarnamukhi	"Paavadaiyaa"	Swararaj		
1998	Swarnamukhi	"Poovum Malarnthida"	Swararaj		
1998	Colour Kanavugal	"Gundumalli Pooveduthu"	Adithyan		
1998	Vaettiya Madichu Kattu	"Andha Neelakuyil"	Deva		Mano
1998	Bhagavath Singh	"Aathukkari Odambu"	Deva		
1998	Bhagavath Singh	"Avan Kangalai"	Deva		
1998	Ini Ellam Sugame	"Ae Poongatru"	Sirpy		
1998	Ninaithen Vandhai	"Pottu Vaithu"	Deva		S.P. Balasubrahmanyam
1998	Ponnu Velayira Bhoomi	"Pattu Kattum Kuyilu"	Deva		
1998	Ponnu Velayira Bhoomi	"Oore Mathichi"	Deva		
1998	Ponnu Velayira Bhoomi	"Poya Un Moonjile"	Deva		Anuradha Sriram, Deva and Vadivelu
1998	Veera Thalattu	"Vaadipatti"	Ilaiyaraaja		
1998	Veera Thalattu	"Saanthu Pottu"	Ilaiyaraaja		Arunmozhi
1998	Veera Thalattu	"Pattappagal"	Ilaiyaraaja		
1998	Veera Thalattu	"Aaraaro"	Ilaiyaraaja		
1998	Jolly	"Nandhavaname Nandhavaname"	Kavi		
1998	Jolly	"Idhu Vazhkaiyil Thirunal"	Kavi		
1998	Jolly	"Ettukkum Pathukkum"	Kavi		
1998	Jolly	"Katchi Kodi Ellam"	Kavi		
1998	Rathna	"Vaadipatti"	Jaya Surya		
1998	Rathna	"Kannil Aadum"	Jaya Surya		
1998	Harichandra	"Kadhal Enbadhu"	Agosh		
1998	Iniyavale	"Uyire Uyire"	Deva		
1998	Dharma	"Sembarutthi"	Ilaiyaraaja		
1998	Sandhippoma	"Namma Meena"	Deva		
1998	Nilaave Vaa	"Onnum Onnum"	Vidyasagar		
1998	En Aasai Rasave	"Maamarakuyile"	Deva		S.P Balasubrahmanyam
1998	En Aasai Rasave	"Kattanum"	Deva		Malaysia Vasudevan
1998	En Aasai Rasave	"Sola Kaattu Pathayila"	Deva		
1998	Thayin Manikodi	"Mr. Hollywood"	Vidyasagar		
1998	Thayin Manikodi	"Sixteena Seventeena"	Vidyasagar		
1998	Unnudan	"Cochin Madappura"	Deva		
1998	Simmarasi	"Vannathu Nilaveduthu"	S. A. Rajkumar		P. Unnikrishnan
1998	Urimai Por	"Erode Santhaiyiley"	Deva		
1998	Urimai Por	"Sottu Sottu Mazhaithuli"	Deva		
1998	Veeram Vilanja Mannu	"Koo Koo Kuyil"	Deva		
1998	Veeram Vilanja Mannu	"Aasai Pattu"	Deva		S.P Balasubrahmanyam
1998	Veeram Vilanja Mannu	"Utthu Utthu Paakatheenga"	Deva		P. Unnikrishnan
1998	Veeram Vilanja Mannu	"Mayilu Mayilu"	Deva		Arunmozhi
1998	Veeram Vilanja Mannu	"Enga Thaathan"	Deva		
1998	Pudhumai Pithan	"Unnai Kandaen"	Deva		
1998	Naesikkiren	"Rajarajanin"	Ramana Gogula		Mano
1998	Naesikkiren	"Naesikkiren"	Ramana Gogula		S.P. Balasubrahmanyam
1998	Ponmaanai Thedi	"Solvathellam Unmai"	Soundaryan		
1998	Guru Paarvai	"Podu Jeans"	Deva		
1998	Guru Paarvai	"Ding Dong"	Deva		
1998	Guru Paarvai	"Parvai Parvai"	Deva		
1998	Guru Paarvai	"Vekkali Amman"	Deva		
1998	Kumbakonam Gopalu	"Butterfly Oh"	Ilaiyaraaja		
1998	Pooveli	"Muthu Muthu"	Bharadwaj		
1998	Thalaimurai	"Dappankuthu"	Ilaiyaraaja		
1998	Cheran Chozhan Pandian	"Madras Electric"	Soundaryan		
1998	Kaadhal Kavithai	"Thatthom Thagathimi"	Ilaiyaraaja		
1998	Sivappu Nila	"Sivakasi Mestri"	Deva		
1998	Sivappu Nila	"Pooparikka"	Deva		
1999	Chinna Raja	"Hoi Hoi Hoi"	Deva		Sujatha Mohan
1999	Adutha Kattam	"Macham Enakirukku"	S. P. Venkatesh		
1999	Adutha Kattam	"Vaaya Vaaya"	S. P. Venkatesh		
1999	Ethirum Pudhirum	"Thottu Thottu Pesum"	Vidyasagar		Pushpavanam Kuppusamy
1999	Ethirum Pudhirum	"Nilavonnu Pathikichi"	Vidyasagar		Hariharan
1999	Ullathai Killathe	"O Nenje"	Deva		
1999	Annan	"Ootha Roobavukku	Ilaiyaraaja		
1999	Monisha En Monalisa	"College Irukkutha"	T. Rajendar		
1999	Periyanna	"Juddadi Laila"	Bharani		Vijay
1999	Periyanna	"Pollachi Malai"	Bharani		Arunmozhi, Deva
1999	Poomaname Vaa	"Kaathu Kulir"	Sirpy		
1999	Poomaname Vaa	"Kanchipuram"	Sirpy		
1999	Vaalee	"Gee Priya"	Deva		S.P. Balasubrahmanyam
1999	Rajasthan	"Jin Jilara"	Ilaiyaraaja		Mano
1999	Rajasthan	"Sorgathil Nikka"	Ilaiyaraaja		Shankar Mahadevan
1999	Rajasthan	"Pennendral No Problem"	Ilaiyaraaja		P. Unnikrishnan
1999	Rajasthan	"Akaiyi Kadiyilin"	Ilaiyaraaja		Shankar Mahadevan
1999	Taalam	"Kadhal Yogi"	A. R. Rahman		
1999	Kummi Paattu	"Uchi Veyilukku"	Ilaiyaraaja		Arunmozhi
1999	Kummi Paattu	"Oorukku"	Ilaiyaraaja		Arunmozhi
1999	Kummi Paattu	"Ammiyilea Aracchi"	Ilaiyaraaja		Arunmozhi
1999	Kummi Paattu	"Aasai Macchan"	Ilaiyaraaja		Arunmozhi
1999	Kummi Paattu	"Adi Poonguyile"	Ilaiyaraaja		
1999	Anantha Poongatre	"Yekka Yekka"	Deva		Srinivas
1999	Anantha Poongatre	"Uyire Nee Vilagadhe"	Deva		
1999	Nenjinile	"Thanganiram"	Deva		Vijay
1999	Kadhalar Dhinam	"Kadhalenum Thervezhudi"	A. R. Rahman	Vaali	S.P. Balasubrahmanyam
1999	Anthapuram	"Maana Madura"	Ilaiyaraaja		
1999	Suyamvaram	"Marghazhi Maasathu"	S. A. Rajkumar		Sujatha, P. Unnikrishnan and S.P. Balasubrahmanyam
1999	Ponvizha	"Naadu Sezhikka"	Deva		
1999	Kadhal Vennila (D)	"Rammanoda"	Mani Sharma		Mano
1999	Kadhal Vennila (D)	"Anthiriyil"	Mani Sharma		Mano
1999	Kannodu Kanbathellam	"Ai Yamma"	Deva		
1999	Jodi	"Anjathey Jeeva"	A. R. Rahman		Sirkazhi Sivachidambaram
1999	Kaama	"Aasai Sugamanathu"	Adithyan		
1999	Manaivikku Mariyadhai	"Rathiri Nerathile"	Sirpy		
1999	Maravathe Kanmaniye	"Raasathi Manasupolea"	Mahakumar		S. P. Balasubrahmanyam
1999	Suryodayam	"Poo Medhai"	Gnani		
1999	Suryodayam	"Anbu Arasala Vendum"	Gnani		
1999	Mudhalvan	"Ulunthu Vithaikayile"	A. R. Rahman		Srinivas
1999	Taj Mahal	"Kuliruthu Kuliruthu"	A. R. Rahman		Unnikrishnan
1999	Iraniyan	"En Maaman"	Deva		
1999	Sivan	"Epyptu Naattu Cleopatra"	Adithyan		
1999	Time	"Naan Thanga Roja"	Ilaiyaraaja		
1999	Unnaruge Naan Irundhal	"Poori Poori"	Deva		
1999	Sethu	"Kadhalenna Kadhalenna"	Ilaiyaraaja		
1999	Manam Virumbuthe Unnai	"Manasa Killi"	Ilaiyaraaja		

=== 2000s ===
Year	Film	Song	Composer(s)	Writer(s)	Co-artist(s)
2000	Kadhal Rojavae	"Midnight Vaali Mama"	Ilaiyaraaja		S. P. Balasubrahmanyam
2000	Thirunelveli	"Ini Naalum Thirunaal"	Ilaiyaraaja		
2000	Vaanathaippola	"Thaavaniye Ennai"	S. A. Rajkumar		
2000	Eazhaiyin Sirippil	"Pacchakallu Mookuthiya"	Deva		
2000	Annai	"Aaraariro Aarariro"	Dhina		
2000	Annai	"Vennilavae Vennilavae"	Dhina		
2000	Sudhandhiram	"Cococola"	S. A. Rajkumar		Shankar Mahadevan
2000	Mugavaree	"O Nenje"	Deva		
2000	Alai Payuthey	"Evano Oruvan"	A. R. Rahman		
2000	Rajakali Amman	"Santhana Malligayil"	S. A. Rajkumar		Vadivelu
2000	Rajakali Amman	"Santhana Malligayil"(Version ll)	S. A. Rajkumar		S. A. Rajkumar
2000	Veeranadai	"Netthi Pottu"	Deva		
2000	Veeranadai	"Usuruvechhen"	Deva		
2000	Athey Manithan	"Idiyappam"	Adithyan		
2000	Magalirkkaga	"Kosuvam Sorugi"	Varshan		
2000	Karisakattu Poove	"Manasirukka Manasirukka"	Ilaiyaraaja		
2000	Karisakattu Poove	"Un Kendakaalu"	Ilaiyaraaja		
2000	Kuberan	"Vennilave"	S. A. Rajkumar		
2000	Kuberan	"Aanadha Roja"	S. A. Rajkumar		Sujatha, P. Unnikrishnan
2000	Simmasanam	"Adi Alenkiliye"	S. A. Rajkumar		Shankar Mahadevan
2000	Simmasanam	"Manja Manja Kezhangu"	S. A. Rajkumar		K. S. Chithra, Hariharan
2000	Doubles	"Vennilave"	Srikanth Deva		
2000	Independence Day	"Namma Thayi Mother India"	Deva		
2000	Kannaal Pesavaa	"Thottachinungi"	Deva		Krishnaraj
2000	Maayi	"Oley Oley"	S. A. Rajkumar		
2000	Chinna Chinna Kannile	"Vaigai Aathu"	Sampath Selvan		
2000	Krodham 2	"Vethala Potta"	Deva		
2000	Krodham 2	"Tokyo Pappa"	Deva		
2000	Budget Padmanabhan	"Kaathadichi"	S. A. Rajkumar		
2000	Ilaiyavan	"Vatta Nilave"	Ilaiyaraaja		
2000	Palayathu Amman	"Paal Nila"	S. A. Rajkumar		Anuradha Sriram
2000	Palayathu Amman	"Anthapura Nandhavanam"	S. A. Rajkumar		
2000	Vaanavil	"Oh Penne Thamizh"(Version l)	Deva		
2000	Vaanavil	"Oh Penne Thamizh"(Version ll)	Deva		
2000	Pottu Amman	"Kolusu Mani"	S D Shanthakumar		P. Unnikrishnan
2000	Pottu Amman	"Oyyara Mayil"	S D Shanthakumar		K. S. Chithra
2000	Pottu Amman	"Maalini Soolini"	S D Shanthakumar		
2000	Pottu Amman	"Vennilave Vennilave"	S D Shanthakumar		
2000	Nee Enthan Vaanam	Putham Pudhu'	Sangeetha Rajan		
2001	Looty	"Sillenu Kaathu"	Deva		
2001	Looty	"Maana Maana"	Deva		
2001	Nageswari	"Muthu Muthu"	S. A. Rajkumar		
2001	Vaanchinathan	"Sirikkum Sirippil"	Karthik Raja		
2001	Kasimedu Govindan	Anandhanthan	Soundaryan		
2001	Naan Paada Ninaipathellam	"Muthu Muthu Raagam"	Dhina		
2001	Naan Paada Ninaipathellam	"Anbe Kangalaale"	Dhina		
2001	Naan Paada Ninaipathellam	"Aathalinaal Uaan Unnai"	Dhina		
2001	Engalukkum Kaalam Varum	"Ambalaikku Theriyum"	Deva		
2001	Engalukkum Kaalam Varum	"Ambalaikku Theriyum"	Deva		
2001	Piriyadha Varam Vendum	"Vidaikodu Vidaikodu"	S. A. Rajkumar		
2001	Paarvai Ondre Podhume	"Thulli Thulliyay"	Bharani		Hariharan
2001	Sri Raja Rajeshwari	"Chindala Karaiyil"	Deva		
2001	Middle Class Madhavan	"Maapillai Otta"	Dhina		
2001	Aanandham	"Adi Koochattha"	S. A. Rajkumar		
2001	Krishna Krishna	"Thalli Vecchu"	S. A. Rajkumar		
2001	Dosth	"Enthan Thottathu"	Deva		
2001	Super Kudumbam	"Uyirae En Uyirai"	Adithyan		
2001	Super Kudumbam	"Sri Rangantha"	Adithyan		
2001	Kanna Unnai Thedukiren	"Koil Mani Kettanae"	Ilaiyaraaja		
2001	Poovellam Un Vasam	"Thirumana Malargal"	Vidyasagar		
2001	Vedham	"Hey Meenalochani"	Vidyasagar		
2001	Alli Thandha Vaanam	"Anthi Karukayilae"	Vidyasagar		
2001	Alli Thandha Vaanam	"Thattan Kedakalaiyo"	Vidyasagar		
2001	Maayan	"Oru Maadu"	Deva		
2001	Love Marriage	"Keeravani"	Deva		
2001	Kadal Pookkal	"Alai Alai"	Sabesh–Murali		
2001	Kottai Mariamman	"Vellimalai Kannaththa"	Deva		
2002	Alli Arjuna	"Sollayo Solaikkili"	A. R. Rahman		
2002	Azhagi	"Kuruvi Kodanja"	Ilaiyaraaja		
2002	Punnagai Desam	"Doli Doli"	S. A. Rajkumar		
2002	Shakalaka Baby	"Koodaloor Roatu Mela"	S. A. Rajkumar		
2002	Angala Parameswari	"Gangamma Gowramma"	Dhina		
2002	Angala Parameswari	"Naane Aadhi"	Dhina		
2002	Kannathil Muthamittal	"Signore Signore"	A. R. Rahman		
2002	Charlie Chaplin	"Mudhalam Santhippil"	Bharani		
2002	Charlie Chaplin	"Kannadi Selai Katti"	Bharani		
2002	Kamarasu	"Mazhaya Mazhaya Ippo"	S. A. Rajkumar		
2002	Kamarasu	"Aalayangal Thevayillai"	S. A. Rajkumar		
2002	Gemini	"Nattukatta"	Bharadwaj		
2002	Sri Bannari Amman	"Kallanalum Kanavanthan"	T. Rajendar		
2002	Thamizh	"Kannukkulle Kadhala"	Bharadwaj		
2002	Junior Senior	"Thitthippai"	Yuvan Shankar Raja		
2002	Pesadha Kannum Pesume	"Chikkango"	Bharani		
2002	Pesadha Kannum Pesume	"Udhadugal"	Bharani		
2002	Nettru Varai Nee Yaaro	"Itho Itho"	Deva		P. Unnikrishnan
2002	Ezhumalai	"Lux Paapa"	Mani Sharma		
2002	Thenkasi Pattanam	"Mayilirage Mayilirage"	Suresh Peters		
2002	Karmegham	"Thaaratha Paati"	Vidyasagar		
2002	Plus Two	"Orey Kannil"	Jai		
2002	Sundara Travels	"Adadaa Oorukkulla"	Bharani		
2002	En Mana Vaanil	"Vayasu Vantha"	Ilaiyaraaja		
2002	Namma Veetu Kalyanam	"Vaanam Veetu"	S. A. Rajkumar		
2002	Game	"Jimba"	S. P. Venkatesh		
2002	Game	"Achacho"	S. P. Venkatesh		
2002	Padai Veetu Amman	"Adi Muthu Muthu Maari"	S. A. Rajkumar		
2002	Padai Veetu Amman	"Paambe Adi Naanga"	S. A. Rajkumar		
2002	Ramanaa	"Alli Mudhicha"	Ilaiyaraaja		
2002	Villain	"Adicha Nethi Adi"	Vidyasagar		
2002	Mutham	"Tigirthaana"	Bharani		
2002	Kadhal Virus	"Enthan Vaanil"	A. R. Rahman		
2002	Style	"Pottu Edutthu"	Bharani		
2002	Iravu Padagan	"Raathiyil Paadam"	Rajesh Khanna		
2002	Kalai Kalluri	"Mogam Mogam"	S. A. Rajkumar		
2003	Annai Kaligambal	"Sangu Pushpame"	Deva		
2003	Annai Kaligambal	"Pachai Pachai"	Deva		
2003	Chokka Thangam	"Vellaiyai Manam"	Deva		
2003	Anbu Thollai	"Adicha Adikkanum"	Soundaryan		
2003	Anbu Thollai	"Irukki Pindingalen"	Soundaryan		
2003	Yes Madam	"Avaram Poo Meni"	Bharani		
2003	Yes Madam	"Mama Yem Mama"	Bharani		
2003	Anbe Anbe	"Rettai Jadai Rakkamma"	Bharadwaj		
2003	Pudhiya Geethai	"Manase"	Yuvan Shankar Raja		
2003	Parasuram	"Chittukkuruvi"	A. R. Rahman		
2003	Kovilpatti Veeralakshmi	"Kakka Mugathazhaga"	Adithyan		
2003	Whistle	"Thala Thalavethalai"	D. Imman		
2003	Thayumanavan	"Aariraro"	Vaigundavasan		
2003	Kaiyodu Kai	"Ichukalaama"	Banapathra		
2003	Mullil Roja	"Ingee Araikelae"	Amuthabharani		
2003	Mullil Roja	"Poovasam"	Amuthabharani		
2004	Arasatchi	"Ippadiyae"	Harris Jayaraj		
2004	Arul	"Patthu Viral"	Harris Jayaraj		
2004	Chellamae	"Aariya Udadugal"	Harris Jayaraj		
2004	Maanasthan	"Aasai Vaithen"	S. A. Rajkumar		
2004	Senthalam Poove	"Kadhal Kadhalena"	Vimal Raj		
2004	Uyirosai	"Pachai Kili"	Aravind Sriram		
2005	Thirupaachi	"Enna Thavam"	Dhina		
2005	Selvam	"Maari Enna"	Deva		
2006	Thambi	"Poovanathil"(Duet)	Vidyasagar		
2006	Thambi	"Poovanathil"(Female)	Vidyasagar		
2006	Sudesi	"Kalyana Kanavu"	Srikanth Deva		
2006	Thirupathi	"Sollavum Mudiyala"	Bharadwaj		
2006	Imsai Arasan 23rd Pulikecei	"Panju Meththai"	Sabesh–Murali		
2006	Sillunu Oru Kaadhal	"Kummi Adi"	A. R. Rahman		
2006	Sivappathigaram	"Chithiraiyil Enna Varum"	Vidyasagar		
2006	Adaikalam	"Vankaiyya Vankikayya"	Sabesh–Murali		
2007	Kalakkura Chandru	"Sollava Naan"(Female)	Sunil Xavier		
2007	Kalakkura Chandru	"13 Macham Kondam"	Sunil Xavier		
2007	Kuttrapathirikai	"Madhavara"	Ilaiyaraaja		
2007	Oru Ponnu Oru Paiyan	"Oru Ponnu"	Karthik Raja		
2007	Puli Varudhu	"Kadhalikka Solludi"	Srikanth Deva		
2007	Thirumagan	"Koora Selai"	Deva		
2007	Veeramum Eeramum	"Sapam Pudicha"	Yugendran		
2008	Azhaipithazh	"Melam Katty"	Hitesh		
2008	Bheemaa	"Rangu Rangamma"	Harris Jayaraj		
2008	Iyakkam	"Vuthattoram"	Pravin Mani		
2008	Iyakkam	"Veecharuva Kottaiyila"	Pravin Mani		
2008	Kasimedu Govindan	"Anandhanthan"	Soundaryan		
2008	Maanavan Ninaithal	"Nee Perazhaga"	V Thashi		
2008	Pudhusu Kanna Pudhusu	"Internetil Unnai Kandaen"	A R Venkatesh		
2008	Pudhusu Kanna Pudhusu	"Yae Vaalae Yae Vaalae"	A R Venkatesh		
2008	Ragasiya Snehithane	"Thuppakki"	John Peter		

== Telugu film songs ==
=== 1990s ===
Year	Film	Song	Composer(s)	Co-artist(s)
1990	Ladies Special	"Intikaada Neela"	Saluri Vasu Rao	
1990	Ladies Special	"Avuthundhee"	Saluri Vasu Rao	
1990	Malupu	"Kanneere Kaveri"(Female)	S. A. Rajkumar	
1991	Nirnayam	"O Papalu Papalu"	Ilaiyaraaja	
1991	Alludu Diddina Kaapuram	"Idhi Malleelaa Maasam"	Chakravarthy	
1991	Mamagaru	"Iyale Achamaina Deepavali"	Raj–Koti	
1991	Naa Pellam Naa Ishtam	"Kanne Pillallara"	Raj–Koti	Radhika
1991	Dalapathi	"Yamuna Thatilo"(Happy)	Ilaiyaraaja	
1991	Dalapathi	"Muddha Banthi Poochenule"	Ilaiyaraaja	
1991	Dalapathi	"Yamuna Thatilo"(Sad)	Ilaiyaraaja	
1991	Naagamma	"Nagula Panchami"	Shankar–Ganesh	K. S. Chithra
1991	Naagamma	"Chakkanainaa"	Shankar–Ganesh	
1991	Naagamma	"Pattalu Valiche"	Shankar–Ganesh	
1991	Khaidi Annayya	"Malli Malli"	Ilaiyaraaja	
1991	Rowdeelaku Rowdy	"Vayase Edha Oopinadhi"	Ilaiyaraaja	
1991	Rowdeelaku Rowdy	"Vacha Vacha Varase"	Ilaiyaraaja	
1991	Rowdy And Sipayi	"Nee Andham"	S. A. Rajkumar	
1991	Rowdy And Sipayi	"Godari Varadale"	S. A. Rajkumar	
1991	Pogarubothu Pellam	"Vandha Mandhi"	Hamsalekha	
1991	Pogarubothu Pellam	"Thiyyali Thiyyali"	Hamsalekha	
1991	Pogarubothu Pellam	"Aakashana Jaabilennadu"	Hamsalekha	
1991	City Police	"Naa Vayase Oka Hariville"	Chandrabose	
1991	Vennela	"Jollyle College"	G Anand	
1992	Rowdy Raja	"Chilaka Paluku"	Deva	
1992	Rowdy Raja	"Laali Laali Jo"	Deva	
1992	Bangaru Mama	"O Kovvuri Gutta"	Raj–Koti	
1992	Moratodu Naa Mogudu	"Koyilaala"(Solo)	Ilaiyaraaja	
1992	Moratodu Naa Mogudu	"Koyilaala"(Duet)	Ilaiyaraaja	
1992	Bharatham	"Vinu Veedhiki Yeduregina"	Chakravarthy	
1992	Dabbu Bhale Jabbu	"Chakkadanala Maharajunu"	Gangai Amaran	K. S. Chithra, S. P. Balasubrahmanyam
1992	Peddarikam	"Idhele Tharatara"(Duet)	Raj–Koti	
1992	Gang War	"Valapukidhee"	Raj–Koti	
1992	Pelli Neeku Subham Naaku	"Virahapu Veedhulaaa"	Raj–Koti	
1992	Priyathama	"Priyathaamaa"(Duet)	Ilaiyaraaja	
1992	Priyathama	"Majjaare Maina"	Ilaiyaraaja	
1992	Akka Mogudu	"Akkamma Akkamma"	Raj–Koti	K. S. Chithra
1992	Samarpana	"Chinnadhame Cheekulu"	M. M. Keeravani	
1992	Khaidi Prathap	"Maayamma Sribala"	Satyam	
1992	Naga Bala	"Nithya Thamala"	Shankar–Ganesh	
1992	Naga Bala	"Gantalu Vinapa"	Shankar–Ganesh	
1992	Naga Bala	"Ragala Nagama"	Shankar–Ganesh	
1992	Naga Bala	"Aagamma Naga"	Shankar–Ganesh	
1992	Billa	"Chengumani Chengumani"	Deva	
1992	Yamudannaki Mogudu	"Ambalakidi Jambalakidi"	Adithyan	
1993	Naagini	"Murise Bangaru"	Laxmikant–Pyarelal	
1993	Naagini	"Prema Prema"	Laxmikant–Pyarelal	
1993	Vasthavam	"Ghalamethee Vasthavam"	Chakravarthy	
1993	Amaravathi	"Sarasala Sunda"	Bala Bharathi	
1993	Amaravathi	"Tajmahal Amar"	Bala Bharathi	
1993	Maa Vaariki Pelli	"Vallu Vedekkindhi	Shankar–Ganesh	
1993	Gentleman	"Mudhinepalli"	A. R. Rahman	
1993	Shiva Rathiri	"Amma Chaatu"	Shankar–Ganesh	
1993	Shiva Rathiri	"Srivalli Hrudaya"	Shankar–Ganesh	
1993	Dheerudu Magadheerudu	"Thelavaaru Jaamuma"	Ilaiyaraaja	
1993	Madhumathi	"Vala Veyamma"	Deva	
1993	Madhumathi	"Jhin Chaka Jhin"	Deva	
1993	Gokula Krishnudu	"Ooru Vaada Aadi"	Sirpy	K. S. Chithra
1993	Prema Vasantham	"A For Ambika"	Sirpy	
1993	Sharanam Sharanam Manikanta	"Thandhana"	M. S. Viswanathan	
1993	Evadaithe Nakenti	"Poola Mandapam"	Ilaiyaraaja	
1993	Adhivaram Amavasya	"Virahapu Veenala Jaali"	Raj–Koti	
1994	Money Money	"Ooru Vada Horu"	Sri Kommineni	K. S. Chithra
1994	Veera	"Madhi Kovelaa"	Ilaiyaraaja	
1994	Veera	"Kooruu Kunnaa"(Female)	Ilaiyaraaja	
1994	Veera	"Maatunnadhi"	Ilaiyaraaja	
1994	Veera	"Vannela Thamalapaaku"	Ilaiyaraaja	
1994	Aame Kaapuram	"Kattindhaayyaa"	Ilaiyaraaja	
1994	Bobbili Paparayudu	"Heey Muddhu"	A. R. Rahman	
1994	Bobbili Paparayudu	"Taraka Cheluvu"	A. R. Rahman	
1994	Super Police	"Super Police"	A. R. Rahman	
1994	Gangmaster	"Aa Siggu Eggu"	A. R. Rahman	
1994	Nannagaru	"Oke Oka Intilo"	M. M. Srilekha	
1994	Gharana Premikudu	"Vallo Chikkinadu Bavayya"	Ilaiyaraaja, M. S. Viswanathan	
1994	Premikudu	"Mukkala Mukka"	A. R. Rahman	Mano
1994	Vanitha	"Poodota Poochi"(Sad)	A. R. Rahman	
1994	Sridevi Narsingh Home	"Paruvaala Godhaari"	Raj–Koti	
1994	Yama Love	"Challani Jallulu"	Deva	
1994	Zamindhar Theerpu	"Aashaley"	Deva	
1994	Zamindhar Theerpu	"Valavestha"	Deva	
1994	Police War	"Kannula Dhaagina"	Vijay Anand	
1994	Police War	"Maharaaya Challakochi"	Vijay Anand	
1994	Ardharathri	"Ninnu Aadinchana"	Maharaja	
1994	Ugra Simham	"Vayasu Ponge"	Adithyan	
1995	Anaganaga Oka Roju	"Edo Taha Taha"	Sri Kommineni	
1995	Amma Donga	"Pilla Adharaho"	Koti	
1995	Oka Oorilo Oka Rajakumari	"Priyathama Prema Mooga"	Ilaiyaraaja	
1995	Ammaleni Puttillu	"O Roja Volloki"	Vandemataram Srinivas	
1995	Ammaleni Puttillu	"Lippu Lippu"	Vandemataram Srinivas	
1995	Mister Maayagaadu	"Zee More"	Sri Kommineni	
1995	Bombay	"Kuchee Kuchee"	A. R. Rahman	
1995	Bombay	"Adi Arabic Kada"	A. R. Rahman	
1995	Rangeli	"Hai Rama Orike"	A. R. Rahman	
1995	Ghatotkachudu	"Ja Jja Jja Roja"	S. V. Krishna Reddy	
1995	Ghatotkachudu	"Bhamaro Nanne"	S. V. Krishna Reddy	
1995	Ghatotkachudu	"Left Chudu Rite"	S. V. Krishna Reddy	
1995	Karna	"Aye Shebbhaa"	Vidyasagar	
1995	Karna	"Hello Chinama"	Vidyasagar	
1995	Indira	"Eruvaka Saaga"	A. R. Rahman	
1995	Maya Bazaar	"O Sundhari"	Madhavapeddi Suresh	
1995	Alibaba Adbuta Deepam	"Laskaruu Thirunaallaaku"	Vidyasagar	
1995	Vaddu Bava Thappu	"Orayyo Yo Yo"	Vidyasagar	
1995	Aadaalla Majaka	"Muddhula Maa Kannayya"	Vandemataram Srinivas	K. S. Chithra
1995	Aadaalla Majaka	"Meesam Puttina"	Vandemataram Srinivas	
1995	Aadaalla Majaka	"Mukkala Muquabula"	Vandemataram Srinivas	
1995	Aasha Aasha Aasha	"Oka Cheli"	Deva	
1995	Sisindri	"Chinni Thandri"	Raj	
1995	Mounam	"Bag Lingampalli Porinra Naga"	M. M. Keeravani	
1995	Subhamastu	"Go Go Gopala"	Koti	
1995	Topi Raja Sweety Roja	"Topi Bhale Topi"	Rajendra Prasad	
1995	Topi Raja Sweety Roja	"Yaado Yaado"	Rajendra Prasad	
1995	Ooriki Monagadu	"Yevarinti Kodi"	Vidyasagar	
1995	Ooriki Monagadu	"Prati Mata Oka"	Vidyasagar	
1995	Ooriki Monagadu	"Ammane Amani"	Vidyasagar	
1995	Ooriki Monagadu	"Priyatama Priya"	Vidyasagar	
1995	Ooriki Monagadu	"Neevu Vachhe"	Vidyasagar	
1995	Amma Naa Kodala	"Goranta Depam"	Vandemataram Srinivas	K. S. Chithra
1995	Server Sundharam Gari Abbayi	Tholakarilo Chinukante"	AS Geetha Krishna	P. Unnikrishnan
1995	Amma Naa Koduku	"Poovula Vakita"(Female)	Deva	
1995	Amma Naa Koduku	"Kanne Manasulo"	Deva	
1995	Amma Naa Koduku	"Pilla Gaali Adhirinadhi"	Deva	
1995	Amma Naa Koduku	"Pranamtho Dehaniki"	Deva	
1995	Sastry	"Vayasu Vachi"	Vidyasagar	
1995	Sastry	"Dhinthalakidi"	Vidyasagar	
1995	Emergency	"My Name Is Myna"	Sadhu Kokila	
1995	Emergency	"Anandham Chindhulu"	Sadhu Kokila	
1995	Desha Drohulu	"Hey Mister Hey Mister"	Bhanu Chander	
1995	Rahashya Police	"Manmatha"	Laxmikant–Pyarelal	K. S. Chithra
1995	Aunty	"Pilla Bhale Vollu Bhale"	Ramesh Vinayakam	
1996	Preminchandoi	"Tholisari Chuda"	Deva	
1996	Preminchandoi	"Ravana Chalam"	Deva	
1996	Kranthi	"Kala Anukoo"	Raj	
1996	Kranthi	"Sooneeiaaa"	Raj	
1996	Vajram	"Kuyile Kuyile Kuyile"	S. V. Krishna Reddy	K. S. Chithra
1996	Vajram	"Gampalo Kodentha"	S. V. Krishna Reddy	K. S. Chithra
1996	Vajram	"Thakadhimi Thalamesi"	S. V. Krishna Reddy	
1996	Vajram	"Avva Kaavala Buvva Kavala"	S. V. Krishna Reddy	
1996	Vajram	"Pelleedu Kochindi Pilla"	S. V. Krishna Reddy	
1996	Amalapuram Alludu	"Sexy Mark Roopam"	Vidyasagar	
1996	Amalapuram Alludu	"Kondapalli Bommalanti"	Vidyasagar	
1996	Amalapuram Alludu	"Odi Cheramandhi"	Vidyasagar	
1996	Mahathma	"Oh Brahmma"	Vidyasagar	
1996	Simham	"Muchataina Muddu"	Deva	
1996	Simham	"Cheppava Cheppava"	Deva	
1996	Simham	"Bava Raa Oka Mullu Ikkada"	Deva	
1996	Simham	"Maina Maina Muddula Maina"	Deva	
1996	College Gate	"Kashmiri Apple Bugga"	Deva	
1996	Akkum Bakkum	"Chikku Chikku"	Vidyasagar	
1996	Maa Aavida Collector	"Naa Kodi Koothakochindi"	Vandemataram Srinivas	
1996	Ramudochadu	"Srungara Kavya"	Raj	
1996	Bharateeyudu	"Adireti Dressu"	A. R. Rahman	
1996	Bharateeyudu	"Maya Masichindra"	A. R. Rahman	
1996	Sahanam	"Yaalo Yaalo"	Madhavapeddi Suresh	
1996	Rayudugaru Nayudugaru	"Naa Kantiki Choopuvu"	M. M. Keeravani	
1996	Veerudu	"Neelu Nee Lokam"	Koti	
1996	Ladies Doctor	"O Akashavaani"	Vidyasagar	
1996	Ladies Doctor	"Enneno Nomulu"	Vidyasagar	
1996	Ladies Doctor	"Etupakka Chaka"	Vidyasagar	
1996	Pratignya	"Rukmini Rukmini"	Raj	
1996	Ajay	"Nadhim Dhinna"	Anand–Milind	
1996	Ajay	"Neeli Neeli Kalla"	Anand–Milind	
1996	Akka! Bagunnava?	"Saradha Sadha Cheyyara"	Koti	
1996	Family	"Aalu Magalu"	Prasanna Sarraj	
1996	Family	"Kotha Pelli Koo"	Prasanna Sarraj	
1996	Amma Nanna Kavali	"Amma Nanna Kavali"	Vandemataram Srinivas	
1996	Laati Charge	"Idhe Kadha Ganga"	Adithyan	
1996	Laati Charge	"Idhele Anakapalli"	Adithyan	
1996	Hello Guru	"Love Me Oh Baby"	Raj	
1996	Hello Guru	"Chinni Chinni Aasha"	Raj	
1996	Rendu Kutumbala Katha	"Chitram Bhalare"	Madhavapeddi Suresh	
1996	Rendu Kutumbala Katha	"Jwalat Jwalat"	Madhavapeddi Suresh	
1996	Mr. Romeo	"Mallikale Naa Aashala"	A. R. Rahman	
1996	Gunshot	"Chengaavi Cheearalu Poye"	S. V. Krishna Reddy	K. S. Chithra
1996	Ooha	"O Ooha O Ooha"	J. V. Raghavulu	
1996	Amma Durgamma	"Raavamma"	Vandemataram Srinivas	
1996	Amma Durgamma	"Jyothi Lakshmi"	Vandemataram Srinivas	
1996	Premalekha (((D)))	"Pattu Pattu Paruvala Pattu"	Deva	
1996	Kalyana Prapthirasthu	"Choosa"	Koti	
1996	Aggi Ravvalu	"Madhi Ninduga"	Vishal Bhardwaj	
1996	Aggi Ravvalu	"Palamanasudhi"	Vishal Bhardwaj	
1996	Samara Simham	"Hello Hello Mr Romeo"	M. Jayachandran	
1996	Subash	"Hey Saloma"	Vidyasagar	
1996	CID	"Miluja Miluja Nene Muddu"	Ram Chakravarthy	
1997	50-50	"Shabba Shabba"	A. R. Rahman	
1997	50-50	"Sye Sye Antuu"	A. R. Rahman	
1997	Adavilo Anna	"Addala Medaku"	Vandemataram Srinivas	
1997	Merupu Kalalu	"Strawberry Kannae"	A. R. Rahman	
1997	Thaali	"Guppu Guppu"	Vidyasagar	
1997	Thaali	"Guntha Lakidi"	Vidyasagar	
1997	Kurralla Rajyam	"Osi Pillaa"	Vandemataram Srinivas	
1997	Bobbili Dora	"Chamaku Cha"	Koti	
1997	Abbayigari Pelli	"Sandelalo Priya"	Koti	
1997	Osey Ramulamma	"O Ramulamma"	Vandemataram Srinivas	
1997	Maa Thalli Gangamma	"Pilla Adhirindile"	Raj	
1997	Korukunna Priyudu	"Maina Maina"	Koti	
1997	Jai Bajarangabhali	"Nee Lipstic Ped"	Koti	
1997	Jai Bajarangabhali	"O Sokula Diamo"	Koti	
1997	Muddula Mogudu	"Mainaa Mainaa"	Koti	
1997	Muddula Mogudu	"Are Gili Gili'	Koti	
1997	Preminchukundam Raa	"Pelli Kala Vachesindhe"	Mani Sharma	K. S. Chithra
1997	Aravind	"Buggandham"	Yuvan Shankar Raja	
1997	Aravind	"Erra Suryude"	Yuvan Shankar Raja	
1997	Maa Aayana Bangaram	"Tella Cheera Gilli Champe"	Vandemataram Srinivas	
1997	Evandi Manammaye	"Teenage Papala"	Koti	
1997	High Class Attha Low Class Alludu	"Bolo Ta Ra Ra"	Vandemataram Srinivas	
1997	Illalu	"Egyptu Raani"	Vandemataram Srinivas	
1997	Ratha Yatra	"Chinnappudu"	Vidyasagar	
1997	Ratha Yatra	"Matcha Vunna"	Vidyasagar	
1997	Priyamaina Sreevaru	"Maavayyo Maa"	Vandemataram Srinivas	
1997	Priyamaina Sreevaru	"Iddari Priyuralla"	Vandemataram Srinivas	K. S. Chithra
1997	Encounter	"Yenatikoche Aavullaara"	Vandemataram Srinivas	
1997	Encounter	"Ooru Vaada Akkallaara"	Vandemataram Srinivas	
1997	Kazhana	"Achamma Acha"	Vidyasagar	
1997	Kazhana	"Chaliki Vanike"	Vidyasagar	
1997	Kazhana	"Dheem Tak Tak"	Vidyasagar	
1997	Kazhana	"Poosinadi Vala"	Vidyasagar	
1997	Circus Satthipandu	"Vastava Janaki"	Yugendhar	
1997	Gokulamlo Seeta	"Oo Andhi Pilla"	Koti	
1997	Nayanamma	"O Pori Na Pyari"	Koti	
1997	Priya O Priya	"Colombo Kolla"	Koti	
1997	Priya O Priya	"Cellphone Sund"	Koti	
1997	Pelli Chesukundam	"O Laila Laila"	Koti	
1997	Rakshakudu	"Lucky Lucky"	A. R. Rahman	
1997	Rakshakudu	"Mercury Poolu"	A. R. Rahman	
1997	Rowdy Durbar	"Janani Janma Bhoomi"	Vandemataram Srinivas	
1997	Thambulalu	"Shlookhaam"	Raj	
1997	Thambulalu	"Kallalo Kanne"	Raj	
1997	Thambulalu	"Swaagatham"	Raj	
1997	Allari Pellikoduku	"Romeo Juliet"	Vandemataram Srinivas	
1997	Allari Pellikoduku	"Tholi Choopulo"	Vandemataram Srinivas	
1997	Allari Pellikoduku	"Chitapata Chinu"	Vandemataram Srinivas	
1997	Allari Pellikoduku	"Bejawada Pilla"	Vandemataram Srinivas	
1997	Allari Pellikoduku	"Iddariki Iddara"	Vandemataram Srinivas	
1997	Pelli Pandiri	"Chooda Chakka"	Vandemataram Srinivas	
1997	Pelli Pandiri	"Idhe Manchi"	Vandemataram Srinivas	
1997	Dongaata	"Laaluguda Mallesha"	Bharadwaj	Malgudi Subha
1997	Raasi	"Devaki Devaki"	Sipry	
1997	Raasi	"Kavvinchuko"	Sipry	
1997	Eshwar	"Thelu Kuttindhe"	Deva	
1997	Eshwar	"Jaabhilammaa"	Deva	
1997	Shakti	"Kanti Mundhe"	Ilaiyaraaja	
1997	Shakti	"Vayasukundi"	Ilaiyaraaja	
1997	Mohini	"Naa Prema Kavyam"	Ilaiyaraaja	
1997	Thaali Kattu Shubhavela	"Pelliki Thaambulalu"	Vandemataram Srinivas	
1997	Thaali Kattu Shubhavela	"Aishwarya Rai"	Vandemataram Srinivas	
1998	A	"Chandini Chand"	Gurukiran	
1998	Htudayanjali	"Madrasu Chutti"	A. R. Rahman	
1998	Khaidhi Garu	"Chirunavvu Chirunaamaa"	Koti	K. S. Chithra
1998	Sambhavam	"Cheli Swagatam"	Raj	
1998	Sambhavam	"Shrungaarame"	Raj	K. S. Chithra
1998	Prathista	"Antha Nachada"	Koti	
1998	Telugodu	"Poru Sagutundi"	Vandemataram Srinivas	
1998	Telugodu	"O Chinnari"	Vandemataram Srinivas	
1998	Paradesi	"Boorela Vaari"	M. M. Keeravani	
1998	Aavida Maa Aavide	"Intikeldam Padhavammo"	Sri Kommineni	K. S. Chithra
1998	Suryavamsam	"Jalaku Jalaku	S. A. Rajkumar	
1998	Swarnakka	"Chukkallona Cherina"	Vandemataram Srinivas	
1998	Naga Shakthi	"Naalo Yedho"	Vandemataram Srinivas	
1998	Naga Shakthi	"Naagamayya"	Vandemataram Srinivas	
1998	Maavidaakulu	"Aagadhe Akali"	Koti	
1998	All Rounder	"Golconda Chowrasthalo"	Swaraveenapani	
1998	Vareva Moguda	"Kannu Kotte"	Vandemataram Srinivas	
1998	Vareva Moguda	"Hello Oh Doctor"	Vandemataram Srinivas	
1998	Vareva Moguda	"Vaare Vah"	Vandemataram Srinivas	K. S. Chithra
1998	Vasantha	"Shobana Sunda"	Vandemataram Srinivas	
1998	Vasantha	"Konda Kommu"	Vandemataram Srinivas	
1998	Auto Driver	"Maama Mazare"	Deva	
1998	Jolly	"Rekkalochinaa"	Kavi	
1998	Jolly	"Edho Cheppali"	Kavi	
1998	Jolly	"Seema Kappaki"	Kavi	
1998	Jolly	"Okariki Sunnaki"	Kavi	
1998	Jolly	"Snehaaneekee"	Kavi	
1998	Pavitra Prema	"Divaala Divaana"	Koti	
1998	Awaragadu	"Rupai Rupai"	Madhavapeddi Suresh	
1998	Satya	"Sappudaainaa Cheyaledhe"	Vishal Bhardwaj	
1998	Prematho	"O Priyathama"	A. R. Rahman	
1998	Andharu Herole	"Kurro Kurro Ku"	Sri Kommineni	
1998	Andharu Herole	"Arerere Pagati"	Sri Kommineni	
1998	Andharu Herole	"Juma Juma Ju"	Sri Kommineni	
1998	Choodalani Vundi	"Raama Chilakammaa"	Mani Sharma	
1998	Sreevarante Maavare	"Kalavari Kodala"	Koti	
1998	Jatheeya Pathaakam	"Ooriche Choopu"	Vidyasagar	
1998	Jatheeya Pathaakam	"Mr Hollywood"	Vidyasagar	
1998	Love Story 1999	"O Pilla O Pilla"	Deva	
1998	Suprabhatam	"Singharaayaa"	Vandemataram Srinivas	
1998	Suryudu	"Manasu Mama"	Vandemataram Srinivas	
1998	Peruleni Cinema Title	"Dhoola Raja Aayega"	Koti	
1998	Pellivaaramandi	"Premalekhanai"	K Veeru	
1998	Pellivaaramandi	"Left Chusthe"	K Veeru	
1998	Premante Idera	"Nizam Babulu"	Ramana Gogula	
1998	Subhalekhalu	"Lipstic Pedalaa"	Koti	
1998	Subhalekhalu	"Andala O Mega"	Koti	
1998	Kalavari Chellelu Kanaka Maalakahmi	"Laala Posi"	S. A. Rajkumar	
1998	Kalavari Chellelu Kanaka Maalakahmi	"Dhil Dheeya"	S. A. Rajkumar	
1998	Aayanagaru	"Jaaru Paitaa"	Vidyasagar	
1998	Aayanagaru	"Paluke Bangara"	Vidyasagar	
1998	Antahpuram	"Chamaku Cham"	Ilaiyaraaja	
1998	Criminal 786	"Chaamanthi Poo Thotalalo"	Sirpy	
1998	Vinalani Vundhi	"Jingare Jingare"	Mani Sharma	
1998	O Panai Pothundhi Babu	"Nee Vora Chupullo"	Vandemataram Srinivas	
1998	Jagadheeshwari	"Pahi Parathpari"	Shankar–Ganesh	
1998	Jagadheeshwari	"Shankari Shambavi"	Shankar–Ganesh	
1998	Jagadheeshwari	"Om Shakti Om"	Shankar–Ganesh	
1998	Koteeswarudu	"Tholi Nightu Thappadika"	Agosh	
1998	Prema Kavyam	"Thom Thom"	Ilaiyaraaja	
1998	Prema Kavyam	"Eedochi Na Valle"	Ilaiyaraaja	
1998	Daddy Daddy	"Dil Tho Pagal"	Vandemataram Srinivas	S. P. Balasubrahmanyam
1998	Daddy Daddy	"Jaangri Lanti Pilla"	Vandemataram Srinivas	Mano
1998	Kodukulu	"Easy Easy E C G"	Ram Chakravarthy	Mano
1999	Gayathri	"Kamakshamma"	Ilaiyaraaja	
1999	Gayathri	"Manasaaraa"	Ilaiyaraaja	
1999	Neti Gandhi	"Chalare Chalare"	Mani Sharma	
1999	Pedda Manushulu	"Zebra Zebra"	Eshwar	
1999	Manikyam	"Chal Chal Gurra"	S. A. Rajkumar	
1999	Swapnalokam	"Gagana Seemal Adhire"	Vandemataram Srinivas	
1999	Yamajathakudu	"Nee Chevulaki"	Vandemataram Srinivas	
1999	Yamajathakudu	"Hey Sangaa"	Vandemataram Srinivas	
1999	English Pellam East Godavari Mogudu	"Kokkorokko Punjula"	Mani Sharma	
1999	Devi	"Veyi Padagala Needalo"	Devi Sri Prasad	
1999	Harischandraa	"Shadi Mubarak"	Aagosh	
1999	Swayamvaram	"Keeravani Raga"	Vandemataram Srinivas	
1999	Bharatharatna	"Laalu Daruvaja"	Vandemataram Srinivas	
1999	Kaama	"Aasha Sukhame Katha"	Adithyan	
1999	Speed Dancer	"Mithaai Mithaai Hai"	Ramesh Vinayakam	
1999	Preminche Manasu	"Mumbai Minku"	S. A. Rajkumar	
1999	Premikula Roju	"Prema Ane"	A. R. Rahman	S. P. Balasubrahmanyam
1999	Bobbili Vamsham	"Mandapeetalo"	M. M. Srilekha	
1999	Seenu	"O Manaali O Manaali"	Mani Sharma	
1999	Pichodi Chetilo Raayi	"Kurchi Kurchira"	Vandemataram Srinivas	
1999	Pichodi Chetilo Raayi	"Anjali Sumanjali"	Vandemataram Srinivas	K. S. Chithra
1999	Pilla Nachindhi	"I Love You"	Koti	
1999	Hello Yama	"Kassu Missu Kassu"	Vandemataram Srinivas	
1999	Krishna Babu	"Muddhula Papa"	Koti	
1999	Maa Balaji	"Andhanga Jatha"	Vandemataram Srinivas	
1999	Maa Balaji	"Neeligaganamlo"	Vandemataram Srinivas	
1999	Maa Balaji	"Nedaina Repain"	Vandemataram Srinivas	
1999	Maa Balaji	"Aayee Aayee"	Vandemataram Srinivas	
1999	Vaalee	"Holalla Holalla"	Deva	
1999	Prema Kosam	"Nijamena Ee Praabatham"	Raj	
1999	Preminchedhi Endhukamma	"O Baby Baby"	Ilaiyaraaja	
1999	Oke Okkadu	"Eruvaka Saaguthundaga"	A. R. Rahman	
1999	Jodi	"Andhaala Jeeva"	A. R. Rahman	
1999	Sambayya	"Bhadradri Ramachandra"	Vandemataram Srinivas	
1999	Time	"Naa Siggu Thambulaalu"	Ilaiyaraaja	
1999	Andhra Alludu	"Lechi Lechi Kuchunnadhi"	Ilaiyaraaja	
1999	Andhra Alludu	"Kothaga Chaithrame"	Ilaiyaraaja	
1999	Andhra Alludu	"Ayyare Andhra Alludandi"	Ilaiyaraaja	
1999	Andhra Alludu	"Kuluke Nirantharam"	Ilaiyaraaja	
1999	Andhra Alludu	"Maayadhaari Kannulunna"	Ilaiyaraaja	
1999	Rajasthan	"Swargamlo Nikka Nikka"	Ilaiyaraaja	
1999	Veeranna	"Jodi Kattamandhi"	Vidyasagar	

=== 2000s ===
Year	Film	Song	Composer(s)	Co-artist(s)	Note(s)
1998	Pape Naa Pranam	"Dulhaa Raaja Aayega"	Koti		
2000	Premani Cheppara	"O Priya Priyaa"	Rajesh Roshan		
2000	Prema Savvadi	"Kalalaa Varam Iche"	Ilaiyaraaja		
2000	Prema Savvadi	"Midnight Bhama"	Ilaiyaraaja		
2000	Postman	"Baava Baava Laggamettukora"	Vandemataram Srinivas		
2000	Postman	"Manushullo Gentlemanu"	Vandemataram Srinivas		
2000	Kalisundam Raa	"Vachindi Palapitta"	S. A. Rajkumar		
2000	Sammakka Sarakka	"Amadala Puttina"	Vandemataram Srinivas		
2000	Sammakka Sarakka	"Baloccha Acha"	Vandemataram Srinivas		
2000	Sammakka Sarakka	"Good Morning"	Vandemataram Srinivas		
2000	Chirunama	"O Sakha Sakha"	Deva		
2000	Manasu Paddanu Kaani	"Nenele Laali Pappu"	K Veeru		
2000	Manasu Paddanu Kaani	"Neekaina Telisindha"	K Veeru		
2000	Sakhi	"Kalali Poyenu"	A. R. Rahman		
2000	Bagunnara	"Monna Preminchchaa"	Deva		
2000	Adavi Chukka	"Akka Akka Nuvvekkaade"	Vandemataram Srinivas		K. S. Chithra
2000	Pelli Sambandham	"Ammammo Mayagade"	S. A. Rajkumar		
2000	Pelli Sambandham	"Bhale Bhale Bagundi"	S. A. Rajkumar		
2000	Pelli Sambandham	"Acchi Bucchi Aatalaku"	S. A. Rajkumar		
2000	Manasunna Maaraju	"Allari Priyuda"	Vandemataram Srinivas		
2000	Doubles	"Pellaniki Moguduku"	Srikanth Deva		
2000	Doubles	"Ivi Theerani Mojulu"	Srikanth Deva		
2000	Doubles	"Raama Raama"	Srikanth Deva		
2000	Manasichaanu	"Chik Chik Chik"	Sathya		
2000	Manasichaanu	"Yentha Vintha"	Sathya		
2000	Jayam Manadera	"Meriseti Jabili Nuvve"	Vandemataram Srinivas		
2000	N. T. R. Nagar	"Silk Smitha Malli Puttindhi"	Vandemataram Srinivas		
2000	Arjunudu	"O Pilla Rasagula"	Deva		
2000	Arjunudu	"Holi Holi Rango"	Deva		
2000	Devatha	"Patala Pallavila"	S. A. Rajkumar		
2000	Devatha	"Jaya Jyothi"	S. A. Rajkumar		
2000	Devatha	"Aada Vaachhe Ardhanareeswari"	S. A. Rajkumar		
2000	Devatha	"Vepaku Vepaku"	S. A. Rajkumar		
2000	Bachi	"Hey Kundanala"	Chakri		
2000	Devullu	"Mee Prema Kori"	Vandemataram Srinivas		K. S. Chithra
2000	Devullu	"Sirulu Nosagu"	Vandemataram Srinivas		
2000	Naga Devatha	"Vidhileswaruni"	Hamsalekha		
2000	Naga Devatha	"Naaga Naagini"	Hamsalekha		
2000	Antha Mana Manchike	"Bapure Bhama"	K Veeru		
2000	Antha Mana Manchike	"Kalisi Kapuram"	K Veeru		
2000	Vijayaramaraju	"Maa Kosam Ma"	Vandemataram Srinivas		
2000	Sneham	"College Maina"	Vidyasagar		K. S. Chithra
2000	Sneham	"Devatha Vamsam Neevo"	Vidyasagar		K. S. Chithra
2000	Sneham	"Dooradesham Poyevada"	Vidyasagar		
2000	Sneham	"Krishna Vinavaa"	Vidyasagar		K. S. Chithra
2000	Maa Annayya	"Pilla Bhale"	S. A. Rajkumar		S. P. Balasubrahmanyam
2000	Tirumala Tirupati Venkatesa	"Abbo Naa Bandaru Laddu"	Vandemataram Srinivas		
2000	Durga	"Sogasiriki Haarame"	SD Shanthakumar		
2000	Durga	"Kapadavayya"	SD Shanthakumar		K. S. Chithra
2000	Chalo Assembly	"Poddu Podduna"	J. V. Raghavulu		
2000	Bhoopathi Naidu	"Pandu Pandu"	S. A. Rajkumar		
2000	Bhoopathi Naidu	"Are Sayya Sayya"	S. A. Rajkumar		
2000	Commissioner Narasimha Naidu	"Chitti Chitti Chamanthi"	Deva		
2000	Muddhula Premikudu	"Vache Vache Kalyaname"	Deva		
2000	Chamundi	"Thatha Thatha Tharaa"	Hamsalekha		
2000	Chamundi	"Oosupokai Vachinadhi"	Hamsalekha		
2000	Chamundi	"Vacchindi Vacchindhi"	Hamsalekha		
2000	Mahadevi	"Bhavatharini Bhuvaneshwari"	S. A. Rajkumar		
2001	Mrugaraju	"Dammaentho"	Mani Sharma		
2001	Narasimha Naidu	"Nadhiri Dhinna"	Mani Sharma		
2001	Devi Putrudu	"Okata Rendaa"	Mani Sharma		
2001	Priyamaina Neeku	"Mastu Mastu"	Shiva Shankar		
2001	Akka Bavekkada	"Mensarey Mensaareey"	S. A. Rajkumar		
2001	Orey Thammudu	"Maridi Mahalakshmi"	Vandemataram Srinivas		
2001	Kushi	"Gajja Ghallu"	Mani Sharma		
2001	Prematho Raa	"Hey Dhaga Dha"	Mani Sharma		
2001	Ammayi Kosam	"Chandini Nuvve"	Vandemataram Srinivas		
2001	Chinna	"Abba Hairabba"	S. A. Rajkumar		
2001	Bhalevadivi Basu	"Rayyi Rayyi Ma"	Mani Sharma		
2001	Sri Manjunatha	"Olammo Gowrammo"	Hamsalekha		
2001	Kalisi Naduddam	"Jill Jill Jill Jill"	S. A. Rajkumar		
2001	Simharasi	"Rani Rani Rani"	S. A. Rajkumar		
2001	Shubhaashissulu	"Andham Aarabosukunna"	Ramana Ogeti		
2001	Ladies And Gentleman	"Hey Meenalochani"	Vidyasagar		
2001	Dumm Dumm Dumm	"Aatagadostada"	Karthik Raja		
2001	Dumm Dumm Dumm	"Rahasyamugaa"	Karthik Raja		
2001	Subhakaryam	"Akkaa Akkaa"	S. A. Rajkumar		
2001	Evadra Rowdy	"Entha Muddho"	Koti		
2001	Vandemataram	"Chandhanam"	Deva		
2001	Vandemataram	"Pourusham Sachina"	Deva		
2001	Vandemataram	"No Problem"	Deva		
2001	Snehithuda	"Baaja Moginde Panditlo"	Vandemataram Srinivas		
2001	Atu America Itu India	"Welcome India Kumaari"	Madhavapeddi Suresh		
2001	Idhe Naa Modati Premalekha	"Emitoithunnadi"	Ghantadi Krishna		
2001	Muthyam	"Premalo Padadhaama"	Vandemataram Srinivas		
2001	Abhay	"Andhamaina Aadapuli"	Shankar–Ehsaan–Loy		
2001	Badrachalam	"Oh Oh Cheliya"	Vandemataram Srinivas		
2001	Badrachalam	"Kooda Kooda"	Vandemataram Srinivas		
2001	Grama Devatha	"Suvvi Suvvi"	Dhina		
2001	Grama Devatha	"Ammanu Prema"	Dhina		
2001	Hanuman Junction	"Kushi Kushiga"	Suresh Peters		
2001	Shivani	"Malli Malli"	Mani Sharma		
2001	Aakarshana	"Dora Dora"	Murali Dharan		
2001	Aakarshana	"Chikku Mukkila"	Murali Dharan		
2001	Laila College	"Naa Premanandkora"	Deva		
2001	Nuvvu Chusthe Chalu	"Ragilina Hrudayapu"	Bharani		
2001	Nuvvu Chusthe Chalu	"Chali Chaliga Vana"	Bharani		
2001	Salute	"Laala Nadhalaala"	Mani Sharma		
2002	Seema Simham	"Avva Buvva Kaavalanate"	Mani Sharma		
2002	Brahmachari	"Nakirekallu"	Deva		
2002	O Chinadana	"Vonti Meedha"	Vidyasagar		
2002	O Chinadana	"Havvaa Havvaa"	Vidyasagar		
2002	Raghava	"Prema Prema"	Shashi Preetam		
2002	Raghava	"Nuvve Nuvve"(Pathos)	Shashi Preetam		
2002	Parasuram	"Royyala Pulusu"	M. M. Srilekha		
2002	Neethone Vuntanu	"Jallo Vaanai"	Vandemataram Srinivas		
2002	Neethone Vuntanu	"Pongi Pongi Po"	Vandemataram Srinivas		
2002	Kondaveeti Simhasanam	"Seethakoka Hey Chilaka"	Koti		
2002	Amrutha	"Signore Signore"	A. R. Rahman		
2002	Nuvvunte Chaalu	"Booloka Ramba"	Aakash		
2002	Nuvvunte Chaalu	"Fashion Ranga"	Aakash		
2002	Nee Thodu Kavali	"Balaamani"	Valisha - Sandeep		
2002	Vasu	"Pataku Pranam"	Harris Jayaraj		
2002	Friends	"Mathuga Chuse Javarala"	Shashi Preetam		
2002	Vooru Manadiraa	"Joo Laaliee"	Koti		
2002	Adrustam	"Manaasaa"	Dhina		
2002	Nuvvu Naaku Kaavali	"Koyilamma Nuvvu"	S. A. Rajkumar		
2002	Roja Poolu	"Muchhataga"	Bharadwaja		
2002	Prema Sakshiga	"Mavayya Athayya"	G Bunty Maruth		
2002	Lady Bachelors	"Miss Universulu"	Vandemataram Srinivas		
2002	2 Much	"Kajipeta Babu"	K Veeru		
2002	Trinetram	"Ulliporala Nee Cheera"	Vandemataram Srinivas		
2002	Premalo Pavani Kalyan	"Adagakkaraledu"	Ghantadi Krishna		
2002	Coolie	"Aattha Koothura"	Vandemataram Srinivas		
2002	Romeo	"Nuvvu Naaku Nachaav"	Dhina		
2002	Red	"November"	Deva		
2002	Red	"Vachadu Reddu"	Deva		
2002	Maha Chandi	"Mahima Kiligina"	T. Rajendar		K. S. Chithra
2002	Maha Chandi	"Thanana Athi"	T. Rajendar		
2002	Nandha	"Varichelu Pakkana"	Bharadwaj		
2003	Fools	"Thannulu Thinte"	Vandemataram Srinivas		
2003	Ottesi Cheputhunna	"Bandharulanti Baathilo"	Vidyasagar		
2003	Aayudham	"Meghaale Evela"	Vandemataram Srinivas		
2003	Police Karthavyam	"Donga Vayase"	A. R. Rahman		
2003	Dongodu	"Sotta Buggala Rukkumini"	Vidyasagar		
2003	Charminar	"Icelaa Nicegaa"	Ghantadi Krishna		
2003	Nagama Naidu	"Yededo Kuttindi Kandireega"	Pramod Sharma		
2003	Villain	"Dummeyika"	Vidyasagar		
2003	Missamma	"Missamma"(Female)	Vandemataram Srinivas		
2003	Tiger Harischandra Prasad	"Cheppanaa"	S. A. Rajkumar		
2003	Shambavi IPS	"Abba Nee Andham"	Govardhan		
2004	Vegu Chukkalu	"Naa Chittichellelu"	R. Narayana Murthy		
2004	Sattha	"Pandu Pandu"	Narasimha		
2004	Dosth	"Vey Vey Vatey"	Koti		
2004	Kala	"Thakita Thakita Dhimire"	Oruganti Dharmateja		
2004	Megham	"Nee Asthi Pasthi Jasthi"	K. M. Radha Krishnan		
2004	Samba	"Kitha Kithaluu Pettamaaku"	Mani Sharma		
2004	Yagnam	"Thongi Thongi Chudamaku"	Mani Sharma		
2004	Donga Dongadi	"Sottaa Buggaa Andhagaadi"	Dhina		
2004	Arjun	"Raa Raa Raa Rajakumara"	Mani Sharma		
2004	Siva Shankar	"Endirayyo Endhoorayyo"	Ilaiyaraaja		
2004	Pothuraju	"Andhagaadaa"	Ilaiyaraaja		
2004	Pothuraju	"Chitti Chepama"	Ilaiyaraaja		
2004	Shatruvu	"Bangaru Bava"	Madhukar		
2004	Gangamma Jathara	"Ededu Daarullo"	R. Narayana Murthy		
2004	Prema Chadarangam	"Aaryula Hrudayaapu"	Harris Jayaraj		
2004	Judgement	"Amma Donga Veedu"	Harris Jayaraj		
2004	Anjali I Love You	"Pelliki Thambulam"	Madhavapeddi Suresh		
2005	Youth	"Ekkindhammo Kikku"	Ramana Ogeti		
2005	Please Naaku Pellaindhi	"Tholireyi Muddu"	K Vijay		
2006	Himsinche 23va Raju Pulikesi	"Panchadhaara Chilaka"	Sabesh–Murali		
2006	Tirupathi	"Naa Valla Kadu"	Bharadwaj		
2006	Adavi Biddalu	"Gangammaa Gundello"	R. Narayana Murthy		
2006	Pelli Kosam	"Subakanshalu"	Kamesh		
2006	Pelli Kosam	"Chiru Chiru"	Kamesh		
2006	Ganga	"Ghallu Ghallu"	Koti		
2006	Manasundhi Kaani	"Pilla Yenki"	Karthik Raja		
2007	Neevalle Neevalle	"Vaishakaa Vennela"	Harris Jayaraj		
2007	Yamagola Malli Modalayindi	"Jalakdik Laaja"	Jeevan Thomos		
2007	Vijayadasami	"Cinee Thaara"	Srikanth Deva		
2007	Allare Allari	"Allare Allari"	Chakri		
2008	Bheemaa	"Rangu Rangamma"	Harris Jayaraj		
2008	Itlu Nee Vennela	"Emani Cheppanamma"	JA Sundhar		
2010	Colours	"Ellammo"	Gopi		
2010	Dasanna	"Olamma Olama"	M. M. Srilekha		
2012	Gowri Kalyana Vaibhogame	"Ranga Ranga"	S. P. Venkatesh	Mano	Posthumous Released

== Malayalam film songs ==
Year	Film	Song	Composer(s)	Writer(s)	Co-artist(s)
1989	Ayiram Chirakulla Moham	"Ragavathi Anuragavathi"	Kannur Rajan	George Thomas	M. G. Sreekumar
1992	Rishi	"Ee Raavil"	S. P. Venkatesh	Poovachal Khader	
1992	Panthayakkuthira	"Thinkalaazhcha"	K.J.Joy	Bichu Thirumala	P. Jayachandran
1992	Panthayakkuthira	"Aaruva Mozhi"	K.J.Joy	Bichu Thirumala	
1994	Chiranjeevi	"Oru Mohamanjimayil"	Raj–Koti	Mankombu Gopalakrishnan	M. G. Sreekumar
1994	Chiranjeevi	"Sangamam Eppol"	Raj–Koti		
1995	Highway	"Oru Thari Kasthoori"	S. P. Venkatesh	Girish Puthenchery	
1995	Ezharakoottam	"Illikkaadum"	Johnson	Shibu Chakravarthy	
1995	Saadaram	"Madhu Chandrike Nee"	Johnson	Kaithapram Damodaran Namboothiri	
1995	Kaattile Thadi Thevarude Ana	"Holi Holi"	Johnson	Girish Puthenchery	
1995	Kokkarakko	"Kannikinavinte"	Kannur Rajan	Girish Puthenchery	
1995	Arabikadaloram	"Hey Hawwa Hawwa"	Sirpy	Girish Puthenchery	Mano
1995	Karma	"Holi Holi"	S. P. Venkatesh	I. S. Kundoor	
1995	Karma	"Ellam Indrajaalam"	S. P. Venkatesh	S. Ramesan Nair	K. J. Yesudas
1995	Thacholi Varghese Chekavar	"Neeyonnupaadu"	Sharreth	Girish Puthenchery	M. G. Sreekumar
1995	Oru Abhibhashakante Case Diary	"Sangamam Eppol"	Raveendran	Shibu Chakravarthy	M. G. Sreekumar
1995	Sakshyam	"Olakkaattil"	Johnson	M. D. Rajendran	Mano
1995	Minnaminuginum Minnukettu	"Manjil Pootha"	S. P. Venkatesh	Girish Puthenchery	M. G. Sreekumar
1995	Achan Kompathu Amma Varampathu	"Ponnin Muthe"	S. P. Venkatesh	Girish Puthenchery	Mano
1995	Mangalyasoothram	"Akkuthikkuthaana"	Berny Ignatius	Girish Puthenchery	
1996	Kaathil Oru Kinnaram	"Mele Vinnile"	S. P. Venkatesh	Girish Puthenchery	
1996	Naalamkettile Nalla Thampimar	"Chendumalli Chempaka Malare"	S. P. Venkatesh	Girish Puthenchery	Mano
1996	King Solomon	"Thudi Thudi"	Deva	Girish Puthenchery	K. S. Chithra
1996	Mahathma	"Brahma"	Vidyasagar	Ilakkiyan	
1996	Sulthan Hyderali	"Panchavarna Painkilikku"	Rajamani	Kaithapram	Unni Menon
1996	Sulthan Hyderali	"Sada Nin"	Rajamani	Kaithapram	P. Unnikrishnan
1996	Manthrika Kuthira	"Urmila Getuppil"	Tomin Thachankari	Shibu Chakravarthy	
1996	Dominic Presentation	"Njanoru Madakara Youvanam"	Vidyadharan	Girish Puthenchery	
1997	Snehadooth	"Ente Puthuvasanthame"	Mohan Sithara	Kaithapram	
1997	Bharatheeyam	"Makayiram"	Berny Ignatius	Girish Puthenchery	
1997	Varnappakittu	"Manikkya Kallal"	Vidyasagar	Girish Puthenchery	M. G. Sreekumar
1997	Guru Sishyan	"Kashmiri Penne"	Johnson	Girish Puthenchery	M. G. Sreekumar
1997	The Ranger	"Hayyade En"	S. P. Venkatesh	Bharanikkavu Sivakumar	
1997	Shobhanam	"Thinkal Therirangi"	S. P. Venkatesh	Girish Puthenchery	Biju Narayanan
1997	Raarichante Rajayogam	"Kudakumettil"	Kozhikode Yesudas	Chittoor Gopi	K. J. Yesudas
1997	Raarichante Rajayogam	"Manchaadi"	Kozhikode Yesudas	Chittoor Gopi	P. Jayachandran, K. J. Yesudas, Sindhu Devi
1998	Harthaal	"Jeevithaminiyum"	Mohan Sithara	Bharanikkavu Sivakumar	Biju Narayanan
1998	Punjabi House	"Balla Balla"	Suresh Peters	S. Ramesan Nair	Mano
1999	Independence	"Nandalaala Hey"	Suresh Peters	S. Ramesan Nair	
2000	Monisha Ente Monalisa	"College"	T. Rajendar	Poovachal Khader	M. G. Sreekumar
2000	Vinayapoorvam Vidhyaadharan	"Kaattu Valli"	Kaithapram	Kaithapram	K. J. Yesudas
2000	The Warrant	"Manjala Moodiya"	D. Shivaprasad	S. Ramesan Nair	M. G. Sreekumar
2000	The Warrant	"Mizhiyevide"	D. Shivaprasad	S. Ramesan Nair	
2000	Dreamz	"Vaarthinkal Thennale"	Vidyasagar	Girish Puthenchery	
2000	Thenkasipattanam	"Kadamizhiyil"	Suresh Peters	Kaithapram	Mano
2000	Thenkasipattanam	"Kadamizhiyil 2"	Suresh Peters	Kaithapram	K. L. Sreeram
2000	Sathyam Sivam Sundaram	"Avva Avva"	Vidyasagar	Kaithapram	Mano
2001	Raavanaprabhu	"Pottu Kuthedi"	Suresh Peters	Girish Puthenchery	K. L. Sreeram
2001	Sundara Purushan	"Konchedi"	Mohan Sithara	Kaithapram	
2001	Dubai	"Hai Hillalin Thanka"	Vidyasagar	Girish Puthenchery	M. G. Sreekumar
2001	One Man Show	"Kaashithumba"	Suresh Peters	Kaithapram	Unnikrishnan
2001	Agnipushpam	"Thalathil Melathil"	S. P. Venkatesh	K. L. Sreekrishnadas	
2001	Raajapattam	"Panineer Padathu"	Berny Ignatius	S. Ramesan Nair	K. J. Yesudas
2002	Kuberan	"Manimukile"	Mohan Sithara	Girish Puthenchery	
2003	Chakram	"Kunji Chittolam"	Raveendran	Girish Puthenchery	Vijay Yesudas
2003	Chithrakoodam	"Chandiranaano Manathu"	S. P. Venkatesh	S. Ramesan Nair, Muthuvijayam	
2006	Chiratta Kalippattangal	"Manassukalil"	Sunny Stephen	ONV Kurup	
2010	Killaadi	"Uthsavamalle"	M. M. Keeravani	Mankombu Gopalakrishnan, Siju Tharavoor	M. G. Sreekumar, M. M. Keeravani, Rajalakshmi Abhiram

== Kannada film songs ==
Year	Film	Song	Composer(s)	Writer(s)	Co-artist(s)
1989	Parashuram	"Saradaara Baa Balina Sindhoora"	Hamsalekha		Dr. Rajkumar
1990	Kempu Gulabi	"Kempu Gulabi"	Hamsalekha		K. J. Yesudas
1990	Kempu Gulabi	"Naanu Ninninda"	Hamsalekha		K. J. Yesudas
1990	Neeli Neeli kanniwali	"olavemba kannadige "	Anand milind		
1990	Neeli Neeli kanniwali	"Nanna E Hrudaya "	Anand milind		
1990	Neeli Neeli kanniwali	"Nee Chandra - Aa soorya "	Anand milind		
1990	Neeli Neeli kanniwali	"Bedavu Yaavadhu Oushadha "	Anand milind		
1990	Neeli Neeli kanniwali	"Hay Priya "	Anand milind		
1990	Neeli Neeli kanniwali	"Hosa Modi Yeno"	Anand milind		
1990	Neeli Neeli kanniwali	"Aakaashave Thale Bhagidhe "	Anand milind		
1991	Prema Pareekshe	"Cheliya Gundina Bisi"	Upendra Kumar		S. P. Balasubrahmanyam
1991	Kaliyuga Bheema	"Bhoomiginta Bhara"	Hamsalekha		
1992	Mallige Hoove	"Malenaada Mele"	Hamsalekha		Ramesh
1992	Gharshane	"Aaha Sukhavu"	Upendra Kumar	R. N. Jayagopal	S. P. Balasubrahmanyam
1993	Hendthi Helidare Kelabeku	"Teenage Banthu"	K. Chakravarthy	Chi. Udayashankar	S. P. Balasubrahmanyam
1993	Hendthi Helidare Kelabeku	"Malashri Malashri"	K. Chakravarthy	Chi. Udayashankar	S. P. Balasubrahmanyam
1993	Hendthi Helidare Kelabeku	"Hendathi Helidare"	K. Chakravarthy	Chi. Udayashankar	Manjula Gururaj
1993	Hendthi Helidare Kelabeku	"Baare Bangara lakshmi"	K. Chakravarthy		
1995	Thaliya Sowbhagya	"Nannavale Nannavale"	Raj–Koti	R. N. Jayagopal	Rajesh Krishnan
1995	Thaliya Sowbhagya	"Lal Duppatta"	Raj–Koti	R. N. Jayagopal	Mano
1996	Annavra Makkalu	"O Jaana Neene Nanna Praana"	Rajesh Ramanath		S. P. Balasubrahmanyam
1996	Annavra Makkalu	"Aadabeku Raja Aadabeku"	Rajesh Ramanath		Rajesh Krishnan
1996	Ayudha	"Milja Milja"	Ram Chakravarty	S.Kesavamurty	
1996	Ayudha	"Oduthiruva Jypsinanthe"	Ram Chakravarty	S.Kesavamurty	Mano
1997	Kalavida	"Iniya Iniya"	Hamsalekha		Mano
1997	Kalavida	"Andagara Alimayya"	Hamsalekha		S. P. Balasubramaniyam
2000	Independence Day	"Namma Thayi Mother India"	Deva		K. S. Chithra, Deepika
2001	Vande Mataram	"No Problem"	Deva	V. Nagendra Prasad	Krishnaraj, Srinivas, P. Unnikrishnan
2001	Vande Mataram	"Sandalwood Huduga"	Deva	K. Kalyan	Mano, Unnikrishnan
2001	Madhuve Agona Baa	"America Baby"	Koti	K. Kalyan	S. P. Balasubrahmanyam
2001	Grama Devathe	"Gangamma Gowramma"	Dhina	Sriranga	S. P. Balasubrahmanyam
2001	Grama Devathe	"Naane Aadhi"	Dhina	K. Kalyan	
2001	Phatinga	"Tirugi Tirugi Nodi Nodi"	Gopikrishna		Unni Krishnan
2001	Phatinga	"Aa Tangali Beesalu"	Gopikrishna		Hemanth
2002	Manasella Neene	"Preethiye Ninna"	Raviraj	V. Manohar	Rajesh Krishnan
2002	Prema Khaidi	"Chocolate Hero"	Prashanth Raj	K. Kalyan	
2003	Sri Kalikamba	"Pacche Gili"	Deva	K. Kalyan	Nagachandrika
2003	Vijaya Dashami	"Dasara Banthamma"	Deva	R. N. Jayagopal	S. P. Balasubrahmanyam, Vrunda
2004	Avale Nanna Gelathi	"Sneha Pallavi Haaduve"	Koti		
2004	Avale Nanna Gelathi	"Maagha Maasa"	Koti		Madhu Balakrishnan
2004	Avale Nanna Gelathi	"Devare Nanna"	Koti		S. P. Balasubrahmanyam, Madhu Balakrishnan
2004	Sardara	"Madana Madana"	Venkat-Narayan	K. Kalyan	Narayan
2004	Y2K	"Bidenu Bidenu"	Sadhu Kokila	Ram Narayan	Rajesh Krishnan
2005	Jootata	"Naa Acchu Bella"	R. P. Patnaik	Anand	
2005	Udees	"Rukku Rukku"	Venkat-Narayan	V. Nagendra Prasad	Narayan
2006	Seven O' Clock	"Arere Jinkemari"	M. S. Madhukar	Kaviraj	Mano

== Hindi film songs ==
Year	Film	Song	Composer(s)	Writer(s)	Co-artist(s)
1995	Bombay	"Hamma Hamma"	A. R. Rahman	Mehboob	Remo Fernandes, Suresh Peters
1995	Humse Hai Muqabla	"Muqaala Muqabla"	A. R. Rahman	P. K. Mishra	Mano
1995	Rangeela	"Hai Rama"	A. R. Rahman	Mehboob	Hariharan
1995	Haathkadi	"Aanan Faanan"	Anu Malik		
1995	Haathkadi	"Mera Chandi"	Anu Malik		Anu malik
1995	Haathkadi	"Amma Amma"	Anu Malik		Abhijeet Bhattacharya
1996	Khel Khiladi Ka	"Khel Hai Khiladi Ka"	A. R. Rahman	Mehboob	Shweta Shetty, Suresh Peters
1996	Hindustani	"Latka Dikha"	A. R. Rahman	P. K. Mishra	
1996	Hindustani	"Maya Machindra"	A. R. Rahman	P. K. Mishra	S. P. Balasubrahmanyam
1996	Mr. Romeo	"Mil Hi Gaye"	A. R. Rahman	P. K. Mishra	S. P. Balasubrahmanyam, Sadhana Sargam
1997	Daud	"Shabba Shabba"	A. R. Rahman	Mehboob	Sonu Nigam, Neeraj Vora, Ranu Mukherjee
2000	Dil Hi Dil Mein	"Dole Dole (Imtihan Hum Pyar Ka Deke)"	A. R. Rahman	Mehboob	Srinivas
2000	Pukar	"Sunta Hai Mera Khuda"	A. R. Rahman	Javed Akhtar	Udit Narayan, Kavita Krishnamurthy
2000	Bichhoo	"Tere Hothon Ki Hansi"	Anand Raaj Anand	Sameer	Hariharan
2004	Rakht	"Jannat Hai Ye Zameen"	Anand Raj Anand		Krishna Beura

== Serial songs ==
Year	Serial	Song	Language	Composer(s)	Writer(s)	Co-artist(s)
2002	Ambigai	"Penne Penne"	Tamil	Bharadwaj		Srinivas
2003	Kunkuma Bhagya	"Kunkuma Bhagya"	Kannada			S. P. Balasubramaniam
2003	Sri BHAGAVATHAM	"3 Songs"	Telugu		Veturi Sundhara Ramamurthy	
