= Vineetha =

Actress

- Born: Santhiya; Visakhapatnam, India
- Other name: Thakkali
- Occupation: Actress
- Years active: 1993-2009

Vineetha is a former Indian actress, who appeared predominantly in Tamil films and Malayalam films. She has also acted in some Kannada, Telugu and Hindi films.

== Career ==
The actress was arrested in 2003 on suspicion of prostitution but was later cleared in 2004 with no charges, with Vineetha stating the trial had put her through mental agony and she added that the police had filed a false case against her to malign her name in the society. After taking a break from the industry for eight years, she returned in 2008 to play a supporting role in the low-budget drama Enga Raasi Nalla Raasi. She has acted in over 70 films in most of the major Indian languages.

Her younger brother Shankar acted in a film called Thullum Kaalam (2005).

== Notable filmography ==
Year	Film	Role	Language	Notes
1993	Chinna Jameen	Jyothi	Tamil	
1993	Kattabomman	Priya	Tamil	
1994	Chinna Madam	Gayathri	Tamil	
1994	Alludu Pooru Ammai Joru		Telugu	
1994	Nila	Nila / Ramya	Tamil	
1994	Pathavi Pramanam	Krishnaveni	Tamil	
1994	Ulavaali		Tamil	
1994	Uzhiyan	Kanaka	Tamil	
1994	Vietnam Colony	Gayathri	Tamil	
1995	Veluchami	Rasathi	Tamil	
1995	Raja Muthirai	Abirami	Tamil	
1995	Karnaa	Anjali	Tamil	
1995	Periya Kudumbam	Bharathi	Tamil	
1995	Mr. Madras	Devi	Tamil	
1995	Maa Manithan		Tamil	
1995	Maanthrikam	Menaka	Malayalam	
1996	Mahaprabhu	Jyothi	Tamil	
1996	Pudhu Nilavu	Actor Jeeva	Tamil	
1996	Gnanapazham		Tamil	
1996	Karuppu Roja	Neena	Tamil	
1996	Rajaputhran	Moti	Malayalam	
1996	Dhani	Vaani	Kannada	
1996	Intlo Illalu Vantintlo Priyuralu	Manisha	Telugu	
1996	Ladies Doctor	Janaki	Telugu	
1996	Manava 2022	Priya	Kannada	
1997	Samrat	Chandramukhi	Tamil	
1997	Shapath	Shalu	Hindi	
1998	Ponnu Velayira Bhoomi	Valli	Tamil	
1998	Veera Thalattu	Eswari	Tamil	
1998	Sivappu Nila	Raani / Jhansi	Tamil	
1998	Mayajalam	Surya Shanker	Malayalam	
1998	Ustadon Ke Ustad	Sapna	Hindi	
1998	Vaare Vah Moguda	Sailaja	Telugu	
1999	Shera	Shivani	Hindi	
1999	Durgada Huli		Kannada	
2000	Vaanathaippola	Radha	Tamil	
2000	Agniputra	Shalu	Hindi	
2000	The Warrant	Annie	Malayalam	
2000	Rapid Action Force	Vasantha Kumari	Malayalam	
2000	Paapigala Lokadalli	Bhavana	Kannada	
2001	Engalukkum Kaalam Varum	Teja	Tamil	
2001	Bengal Tiger	Vangana	Hindi	
2002	Thandavam	Vasundharamma	Malayalam	
2002	Ee Bhargavi Nilayam	Devi	Malayalam	
2003	Kaliyodam	Vineetha	Malayalam	
2005	Thullum Kaalam	Porkodi	Tamil	
2006	Desiya Paravai	Priya	Tamil	
2009	Enga Raasi Nalla Raasi	Chandramukhi	Tamil	
