= Pudhu Nilavu =

- Poster
- Directed by: Vishnuhasan
- Written by: Vishnuhasan
- Produced by: Vishnuhasan
- Starring: Jayaram; Vineetha; Ramesh Aravind; Sanghavi
- Cinematography: P. K. H. Das
- Edited by: C. Cedrick
- Music by: Deva
- Production company: Rajalakshmi Cini Medias
- Release date: 10 May 1996
- Running time: 130 minutes
- Country: India
- Language: Tamil

Pudhu Nilavu (transl. New Moon) is a 1996 Indian Tamil-language film, written, directed and produced by Visnhuhasan in his debut. The film stars Jayaram, Vineetha, Ramesh Aravind and Sanghavi. It was released on 10 May 1996.

== Plot ==
Madan breaks his friendship with Anand because the latter likes the same girl he does. However, Madan is extremely shocked when he makes a discovery about Anand.

== Cast ==
- Jayaram as Anand
- Vineetha as Jeeva
- Ramesh Aravind as Madhan
- Sanghavi as Latha
- Goundamani
- Senthil
- Major Sundarrajan as Anand's grandfather
- Charle
- Ilavarasi
- Sailatha
- Idichapuli Selvaraj
- Kovai Senthil
- Kazan Khan as Dharma
- Jyothi Meena
- Junior Balaiah as Latha's father
- C. R. Saraswathi as Latha's mother
- Karuppu Subbiah
- Chelladurai
- Thiruppur Ramasamy
- Anuja

== Soundtrack ==
Soundtrack was composed by Deva.

Track listing
No.	Title	Lyrics	Singer(s)	Length
1.	"Naughty Girl"	Vairamuthu	Suresh Peters, Swarnalatha
2.	"Pondy Bazaar Roattu"	Kalidasan	Mano, Bhuvana Venkatesh
3.	"Pudhu Nilavu Idhu"	Vairamuthu	S. Janaki, Chorus
4.	"Sela Onnu Katti"	Vairamuthu	Swarnalatha, Indira
5.	"Thenpandi Thendral"	Vairamuthu	S. P. Balasubrahmanyam, K. S. Chithra
6.	"Vanna Vanna Pookal"	Vairamuthu	Unni Menon, Mano

== Reception ==
D. S. Ramanujam of The Hindu wrote, "When a director is aware that he has a weak, oft-repeated plot on hand, either he must bolster the proceedings with a well-planned screenplay or concentrate on entertainment elements to camouflage this drawback. Debutant director Vishnu Hasan, who has written the story, screenplay and dialogue (and a producer too) buckles under this workload".
