= Ponnu Velayira Bhoomi =

- Directed by: K. Krishnan
- Written by: K. Krishnan
- Produced by: A. G. Subramanian
- Starring: Rajkiran; Khushbu; Vineetha
- Cinematography: Ravi Shankar
- Edited by: A. K. Shankar; C. Srinivasan
- Music by: Deva
- Production company: AGS Films International
- Release date: 10 April 1998
- Running time: 135 minutes
- Country: India
- Language: Tamil

Ponnu Velayira Bhoomi (transl. Land of gold) is a 1998 Indian Tamil-language comedy drama film directed by K. Krishnan. The film stars Rajkiran, Khushbu and Vineetha, with Manivannan, Vadivelu, R. Sundarrajan, Vennira Aadai Moorthy, Vittal Rao and Latha in supporting roles. It was released on 10 April 1998.

== Plot ==
Palanisamy (Rajkiran) is a kind-hearted rich farmer and he soon becomes the village chief. Palanisamy is known in his village for holding demonstrations. The poor village girl Valli (Vineetha) falls in love with Palanisamy until Valli knows that Palanisamy is in fact married to Pushpa (Khushbu) who is mentally ill.

In the past, Pushpa was an arrogant english-medium school owner. She first clashed with Palanisamy, then they fell in love with each other. On a misunderstanding, they get married and they lived happily together. Pushpa's father (Vittal Rao) wanted to take revenge on Palanisamy. During her childbirth, Pushpa's newborn baby died and Pushpa couldn't get pregnant again. Just after this incident, Pushpa became mentally ill.

Valli decides to take care of Pushpa. Later, at the village court, Valli claims that Palanisamy married her. In the meantime, Pushpa becomes again as she was and the upset Pushpa goes back to her parents. Palanisamy feels lost.

Meanwhile, the farmers have been scammed by a vicious businessman (Manivannan) and Pushpa's father. Palanisamy recovers the farmers' properties and ultimately saves Pushpa's father from the angry farmers. Pushpa then reveals to Palanisamy that she wanted to see Palanisamy having a baby so she plans everything with Valli's help. Palanisamy and Valli forgive Pushpa. Palanisamy and Pushpa live happily ever after.

== Cast ==
- Rajkiran as Palanisamy
- Khushbu as Pushpa
- Vineetha as Valli
- Manivannan as Businessman
- Vadivelu as Amavasai
- R. Sundarrajan as Arumugam
- Vennira Aadai Moorthy
- Vittal Rao as Pushpa's father
- Latha as Pushpa's mother
- Vaani as Valli's mother
- Vichithra
- Shakeela
- Idichapuli Selvaraj
- Vaiyapuri
- Vijayamma
- Sekhar
- Pollachi Sukumaran
- Ravichandran
- Ramakrishna Iyer
- MLA Thangaraj

== Production ==
The film took over a year to make, and had a delayed release.

== Soundtrack ==
The soundtrack was composed by Deva, with lyrics written by Vaali.

Song	Singer(s)	Duration
"Paattu Kattum Kuyilu"	Swarnalatha	5:09
"Oorae Mathichi Nikkum"	Swarnalatha, Mano	4:09
"Poya Unn Moonjila"	Swarnalatha, Anuradha Sriram, Vadivelu, Deva	3:36
"Vettu Vettu"	K. S. Chithra	4:33
"Manja Thalikatti"	S. P. Balasubrahmanyam	5:55

== Release ==
The film was a commercial success.

== Legacy ==
The dialogue "Sodhikadinga Da Ennaya" (Don't test my patience) spoken by Vadivelu became popular and has entered Tamil vernacular.
