= Sivappu Nila =

- Directed by: J. George Prasad
- Written by: J. George Prasad; K. Raja (dialogues)
- Produced by: J. George Prasad
- Starring: Raja; Vineetha
- Cinematography: M. Sridhar
- Edited by: N. Benerji
- Music by: Deva
- Production company: Velankanni Cine Arts
- Release date: 25 December 1998
- Running time: 115 minutes
- Country: India
- Language: Tamil

Sivappu Nila (transl. Red moon) is a 1998 Indian Tamil-language action thriller film directed and produced by J. George Prasad. The film stars Raja and Vineetha, with Vinu Chakravarthy, Vennira Aadai Moorthy, Vadivelu, Delhi Ganesh, Chinni Jayanth and Alex playing supporting roles. It was released on 25 December 1998.

== Plot ==
Raja is a CID inspector of police who is charged to solve the murder of the smuggler Durai. The only clue he would have is that the killer rode a white horse, wore a monster mask and a black coat. In the meantime, Raja falls in love with the soft-spoken college student Raani. He then meets the tomboy Jhansi fighting with some goons who looks exactly like Raani, and she lies to him that she is Raani's twin sister. The same killer murders the smuggler Maruthu. Raja eventually finds the killer, who turns out to be Raani (who is also Jhansi), and Raani tells him about her bitter past.

In the past, Ramachandran was an ex-police officer who lived happily with his two daughters: Lakshmi and Raani. Lakshmi then found a job as a school teacher in the village Ammalur, but Ramachandran didn't want her to go there. A few years ago, Ramachandran clashed with the smuggler Manikkam who severely injured his leg. In spite of his guidance, Lakshmi went to Ammalur alone. Manikkam and his associates Maruthu and Durai spread terror among the villagers. One day, Lakshmi clashes with Manikkam and slapped him. The vengeful Manikkam, Maruthu and Durai then raped Lakshmi in her school in broad daylight. Lakshmi, Raani and Ramachandran lodged a complaint against the rapists, but the court discharged them. Lakshmi immediately committed suicide in the court. Raani and Ramachandran decided to take revenge on the rapists.

Raja advises her to stop it and to surrender to the police, but Raani has to satisfy her thirst for revenge. She finally kills Manikkam in Ammalur, and Raja arrests her. The court then acquitted her due to the lack of evidence.

== Cast ==
- Raja as Raja
- Vineetha as Raani/Jhansi
- Vinu Chakravarthy as Manikkam
- Vennira Aadai Moorthy as 'Don't Care' Moorthy
- Vadivelu as Thirteen Seventy-Four
- Delhi Ganesh as Ramachandran
- Chinni Jayanth as Thangappan
- Alex as Maruthu
- Banerjee as Durai
- Loose Mohan as Veerappan
- Omakuchi Narasimhan
- C. R. Saraswathi as Lawyer
- Vahini as Lakshmi
- Ilavarasi
- Anuja as item number
- Junior Rathi
- Durga
- Mahendran as Muthu Manikkam
- Master Azharuddin as Manik Baasha
- Rajkanth as Arumugam
- Bheemeshwara Rao
- V. Sathya Narayana
- Judo Ramesh

== Soundtrack ==
The soundtrack was composed by Deva, with lyrics written by Ponniyin Selvan.

Song	Singer(s)	Duration
"Sivakasi Mesthiri"	Swarnalatha	4:31
"Hearteena Diamonda"	Mano	4:33
"Pooparikka"	Mano, Swarnalatha	5:03
"Nee Meena Rasi Ponnu"	Mano, Sujatha Mohan	4:32
"Poovukul Puyal"	S. P. Balasubrahmanyam	4:59
