= Vietnam Colony (1994 film) =

1994 film by Santhana Bharathi

- Theatrical release poster
- Directed by: Santhana Bharathi
- Screenplay by: Santhana Bharathi
- Dialogue by: Crazy Mohan
- Story by: Siddique–Lal
- Produced by: C. V. Rajendran
- Starring: Prabhu; Goundamani; Vineetha
- Cinematography: M. S. Prabhu
- Edited by: N. Chandran
- Music by: Ilaiyaraaja
- Production company: Sree Ganesh Vision
- Release date: 15 July 1994
- Country: India
- Language: Tamil

Vietnam Colony is a 1994 Indian Tamil-language comedy drama film directed and co-written by Santhana Bharathi. It is a remake of the 1992 Malayalam film of the same name which itself was based on the 1983 British film Local Hero. The film stars Prabhu, Goundamani and Vineetha. It revolves around two men trying to persuade some colony residents to relocate to another location for the sake of a corporate project, but the residents, and some goons, oppose them. Vietnam Colony was released on 15 July 1994.

== Plot ==
Venkatakrishnan gets a job with Calcutta Constructions as its supervisor. The company has been in efforts to restructure their land by vacating an illegal colony lying adjacent to its premises. Popularly known as Vietnam Colony, it is inhabited by daily labourers. The company has been in efforts to demolish the colony for long time, but failed to do so. The colony is now under the rule a few hardcore criminals to whom the residents have to pay specific amount every week. Now, Venkatakrishnan is appointed by the company to evacuate the colony by dealing with these criminals. He is assisted by Joseph. Both arrive in the colony disguised as professional writers who are planning to write a story on the life of colony residents.

Upon arrival, both enter the house of a woman in search of a house, but she mistakes them to have come to see her daughter Gayathri and calls her to bring tea and snacks. But after knowing that the goof happened, she lets them stay on the top floor of her house. Upon the advice of the house broker, Gayathri's mother believes that with time, her daughter might fall in love with Venkatakrishnan and marry him. In the coming days, Venkatakrishnan befriends with various members of the colony and tries to read out their idea about vacating the colony. But he realises it is not an easy task to evacuate the people and thinks about different plans to be operated. From Gayathri's mother, Venkatakrishnan learns that the entire colony was owned by Sulaiman, a millionaire who gave up his mother for money. What happens next is the rest of story.

== Cast ==
- Prabhu as Venkatakrishnan
- Goundamani as Joseph
- Vineetha as Gayathri
- Nassar as Sulaiman Seth
- Vijaya Rangaraj as Rauther
- Manorama as Janaki
- S. N. Lakshmi
- Kaka Radhakrishnan
- Uday Prakash as advocate Thomas
- Ashok Rao
- R. S. Shivaji as Broker Paramasivam
- Delhi Ganesh
- Thyagu as Pattabhiraman

== Production ==
Vietnam Colony is a remake of the 1992 Malayalam film of the same name, which itself was based on the 1983 British film Local Hero. The film was initially titled Indru Mudhal (transl. From today) before it was changed to match the Malayalam original. Gautami was initially cast as the lead actress but she was replaced by Vineetha. Crazy Mohan wrote the dialogues.

== Soundtrack ==
The music was composed by Ilaiyaraaja.

Track listing
No.	Title	Lyrics	Singer(s)	Length
1.	"Kaiyil Veenai"	Vaali	Bombay Jayashri	4:58
2.	"Margazhi Masam"	Pulamaipithan	Mano, Swarnalatha	4:41
3.	"Samikku Nan Poo"	Vaali	Mano	4:53
4.	"Tham Thadhikida"	Vaali	Mano	4:52
5.	"Yenakku Ullathellam"	Panchu Arunachalam	Swarnalatha	5:05
6.	"Yennamo Solla"	Pulamaipithan	Mano, Swarnalatha	5:08
Total length:				29:37

== Release and reception ==
Vietnam Colony was released on 15 July 1994. On 22 July 1994, The Indian Express wrote, "An unusual story by Siddiq-Lal keeps the proceedings alive for the most part." On 6 August 1994, New Straits Times wrote, "This is a serious story but what we get are comic situations which Santhana Bharathi manages very well". R. P. R. of Kalki wrote that those who want to have fun can wake up at interval, and if viewers want to shed tears, they can sit until the end.
