= Chinna Madam =

- Theatrical release poster
- Directed by: Dilip Kumar
- Written by: Dilip Kumar
- Produced by: R. B. Choudary
- Starring: Ramki; Vineetha; Nadhiya
- Cinematography: R. Raja Ratnam
- Edited by: B. Ramesh
- Music by: Sirpy
- Production company: Super Good Films
- Release date: 15 July 1994
- Running time: 140 minutes
- Country: India
- Language: Tamil

Chinna Madam (transl. Younger Madam) is a 1994 Indian Tamil language film directed by Dilip Kumar and produced by R. B. Choudary. The film stars Ramki, Vineetha and Nadhiya. It was released on 15 July 1994.

== Plot ==
Gopal is sentenced to death for killing his wife Gayathri, and his last wish is meeting the feminist writer Tamilarasi. When Gopal meets Tamilarasi, he tells her about his bitter past.

In the past, Gopal was from a middle-class family and lived with his mother Sharadha and his mentally ill sister Chithra. He fell in love with the rich city girl Gayathri and eventually married her. Gayathri and Gopal started to quarrel about small matters, and Gayathri did not like the fact that he was not rich. Finally, Gayathri removed her thaali and filed for a divorce. Heartbroken, his mother, Sharadha, died of a heart attack. When Gopal proceeded with his mother's cremation, he became angry, and he ran with a fire torch to Gayathri's house, where he discovered Gayathri already being on fire.

After hearing his version of events, Tamilarasi decides to save Gopal at any cost before his execution.

== Cast ==
- Ramki as Gopal
- Vineetha as Gayathri
- Nadhiya as Tamilarasi
- Yuvarani as Meera
- Vinodhini as Chithra
- Livingston as a lawyer
- Raja Ravindra as a police officer
- C. R. Vijayakumari as Sharadha
- Senthil as Alexander
- R. Sundarrajan as Gayathri's father
- Sathyapriya as Gayathri's mother
- Ra. Sankaran as a judge
- Latha as Shanthi
- Thyagu as Thangarasu, a producer
- Pandu as a director
- Shanmugasundari
- Riyaz Khan as Gopal's friend (uncredited role)
- Raghava Lawrence as Special appearance in the song "Kora Kizhangukku"

== Soundtrack ==
The soundtrack was composed by Sirpy, with lyrics written by Vairamuthu.

Song	Singer(s)	Duration
"Chinna Chinna Idangalai"	Sujatha Mohan, Mano	4:48
"Chinna Chinna Idangalai"	Sujatha Mohan, Mano	4:37
"Kora Kizhangukku Kodi"	Malgudi Subha, Swarnalatha, Mano	4:17
"Muthu Muthu Pennoruthi"	Mano, K. S. Chithra	4:12
"Oru Pounnu Nenacha"	Sujatha Mohan	4:25
"Putham Puthu Oorukku"	Unni Menon	4:25

== Reception ==
Malini Mannath of The Indian Express wrote, "The knot had potential, but the script is insipid the treatment listless and the performances in general far from inspiring".
