= Samrat (1997 film) =

- Directed by: C. Dinakaran
- Screenplay by: C. Dinakaran
- Based on: Baazigar by Abbas-Mustan
- Produced by: Lakshmi Karan
- Starring: Ramki; Vineetha; Rukma
- Cinematography: S. Rajasekaran
- Edited by: Lancy–Mohan
- Music by: Manoj Saran
- Production company: Lakshmikaran Enterprises
- Release date: 10 October 1997
- Running time: 115 minutes
- Country: India
- Language: Tamil

Samrat is a 1997 Indian Tamil-language crime thriller film directed by Sakthi Chidambaram (credited as C. Dinakaran) as his directorial debut. The film stars Ramki, Vineetha, and Rukma.

The film, produced by Lakshmi Karan with music by Manoj Saran and cinematography by S. Rajasekaran was released on 10 October 1997. It is a remake of the Hindi film Baazigar, which was based on the American film A Kiss Before Dying, written by Ira Levin. The film was a box-office failure. Two years after its release, the producers were given a ₹5 lakh (₹500,000) subsidy by the then Chief Minister of Tamil Nadu M. Karunanidhi along with ten other films.

== Plot ==
A young man (Ramki) comes in a remote village in Pollachi. He claims to be Ashok and to be reported missing when he was a kid. His sister Arukkani (Vasuki) and his brother-in-law (R. Sundarrajan) accommodate him in their house. There, Ashok meets Damayanthi (Rukma), the daughter of Sundar (Mohan Natarajan), the wealthiest man in the village. They fall in love with each other. When Sundar arranges Damayanthi's wedding with a rich bride, Ashok is heart-broken. The couples decide to get secretly married in a small temple far from the village. After tying the thaali around Damayanthi's neck, he removes himself from the knot. Damayanthi runs away crying. The entire scene is recorded by a hidden camera, and Ashok then sends the videotape of the scene to Sundar. Ashok then vanishes from the village and starts to blackmail Sundar.

Ashok now lives in the city and tries to repeatedly woo the city girl Chandramukhi (Vineetha) under the name of Samrat. Chandramukhi is studying in the city, and she finally falls in love with him. She also succeeds in passing the IPS exams and eventually becomes a police inspector. Chandramukhi is tasked with a tricky mission: to investigate the disappearance of Damayanthi. Damayanthi is none other than Chandramukhi's elder sister.

Damayanthi is later found by her father Sundar. However, she is not like as before: she became a mentally disabled person. Sundar explains to Chandramukhi what happened in the past to Damayanthi. Sundar tried to do everything to find Ashok but could not find him. Chandramukhi and her father send Damayanthi in a mental hospital. Chandramukhi continues her investigation with Inspector Kalidas (Veera Pandiyan), but without much success. In the meantime, Samrat covers one's tracks. He even kills Damayanthi and the hospital doctor Ilyas (Rajasekhar), who witnessed Damayanthi's murder. Samrat finally reveals to Chandramukhi the reason behind his acts. In the past, Sundar killed Samrat's innocent father (Thalaivasal Vijay) and removed the thaali from his mother's (Sabitha Anand) neck. Sundar later lied to the villagers that he had an affair with Samrat's mother, and she also died.

Samrat is a psychopath who wants to take revenge on Sundar at any cost as he believes that his late mother is still alive. Samrat also wants to impose Chandramukhi the same fate as Damayanthi. What transpires later forms the crux of the story.

== Cast ==
- Ramki as Samrat / Ashok
- Vineetha as Chandramukhi
- Rukma as Damayanthi
- Mohan Natarajan as Sundar
- R. Sundarrajan
- Thalaivasal Vijay as Samrat's father
- Sabitha Anand as Samrat's mother
- Vasuki as Arukkani
- Rajasekhar as Doctor Ilyas
- Veera Pandiyan as Inspector Kalidas
- M. R. Krishnamurthy
- Vichithra
- Jyothi Meena
- K. Prabhakaran
- Chitraguptan
- John Babu
- Karuppu Subbiah
- Ashwin Kumar

== Soundtrack ==
The soundtrack was composed by Manoj Saran, with lyrics written by Muthulingam, Piraisoodan and C. Dhinakaran.

Song	Singer(s)	Duration
"Poove Pon Megame"	Sindhu	3:56
"Vaa Vathiyare"	Mano, Anuradha Sriram	4:35
"Jimbumba"	Suresh Peters, Vasu, Swarnalatha	4:35
"Thaaye En Jeevane"	Chandrabose	2:14
"Oh Oh Oh Oh"	Sindhu	1:13
