= Chinna Jameen =

- Poster
- Directed by: Raj Kapoor
- Written by: Raj Kapoor
- Produced by: K. Balu
- Starring: Karthik; Sukanya
- Cinematography: Bala Murugan
- Edited by: B. S. Nagaraj
- Music by: Ilaiyaraaja
- Production company: K. B. Films
- Release date: 13 November 1993
- Running time: 130 minutes
- Country: India
- Language: Tamil

Chinna Jameen (transl. Young Landlord) is a 1993 Indian Tamil-language masala film directed by Raj Kapoor, starring Karthik and Sukanya. The film introduced former actress Vineetha in her Tamil and acting debut. It was released on 13 November 1993, Diwali day. Rasaiya, a wealthy but cowardly man, is controlled by his uncle, Rathnavel, but an educated woman, Sathya, falls in love with him and makes him a changed man.

== Plot ==
Rasaiya is brought up as an innocent man who suffers torture in the hands of his cruel uncle Rathnavel to get hold of his property for which Rasaiya is considered as the legal heir. He falls in love with Jothi; however, Rathnavel sets his henchman to molest and kill her. Sathya, who joins the Odapatti village as a Village Administrative Officer (V.A.O), turns out to be Jothi's sister who has arrived to avenge her sister's death. With the help of Rasaiya's friends, she transforms Rasaiya into a normal and strong person. In the end, Rasaiya kills Rathnavel and his henchmen and becomes a new heir to the palace.

== Cast ==
- Karthik as Rasaiya / Chinna Jameendar
- Sukanya as Sathya (V.A.O)
- Vineetha as Jothi
- Rajesh as Advocate Rajamanickam
- R. P. Viswam as Rathnavel
- Udaya Prakash as Sedhupathy
- Sabitha Anand as Amsaveni
- Gandhimathi as Aatha
- Goundamani as Thalayari Mama
- Senthil as Vellasamy
- King Kong as Sundeali
- Thalapathy Dinesh as Fighter
- Chelladurai as Jameen Kanakku Pillai
- Kovai Senthil as Villager

== Soundtrack ==
The music was composed by Ilaiyaraaja, with lyrics written by Vaali. The song "Onappu Thattu" is set to Mayamalavagowla raga, and "Oru Manthara Poo" is mostly set in Sriranjani.

| Song | Singer(s) | Duration |
|---|---|---|
| "Manamulla Manusanga" | Mano | 4:41 |
| "Naan Yaaru" | Ilaiyaraaja | 4:51 |
| "Vannathu Poochi" | K. S. Chithra | 0:50 |
| "Oru Manthara Poo" | Mano, K. S. Chithra | 4:31 |
| "Onappu Thattu" | Karthik, Swarnalatha | 4:52 |
| "Adi Vannathi" | Mano, Swarnalatha | 4:59 |
| "Yaar Sumanthu" | Ilaiyaraaja | 1:27 |

== Reception ==
MM of The Indian Express criticised Karthik's performance, stating "he is plainly out of elements" while also panning his dialogue delivery, and said that Raj Kapoor's "script and treatment don't help either". R. P. R. and Thulasi of Kalki in their review panned Karthik's dialogue delivery, flashbacks felt only two songs from Ilaiyaraaja's music are listenable and Goundamani and Senthil's comedy suffers from drought and concluded if only the screenplay was a little more relaxed, all the flies in town would be in the theatre.
