= Mr. Madras =

- Poster
- Directed by: P. Vasu
- Written by: P. Vasu
- Produced by: K. Muralidharan; V. Swaminathan; G. Venugopal
- Starring: Prabhu; Sukanya; Vineetha
- Cinematography: Ravindhar
- Edited by: P. Mohanraj
- Music by: Vidyasagar
- Production company: Lakshmi Movie Makers
- Release date: 8 September 1995
- Running time: 130 minutes
- Country: India
- Language: Tamil

Mr. Madras is a 1995 Indian Tamil language comedy film directed by P. Vasu. The film stars Prabhu, Sukanya and Vineetha. It was released on 8 September 1995, and emerged a Box-office bomb.

== Plot ==
Aruna Arunachalam is an extremely wealthy estate owner in Ooty who is in trouble with Thiruttani, who illegally occupies a few hundred acres of her estate. Murugan won the Mr. Madras award and also worked as a model. His mother advised him to find a decent job. He is later appointed by Aruna to protect her, and she promises to keep him permanently. Aruna has two granddaughters: Meera and Devi. Murugan investigates in Thiruttani's area and he finds Ganja plantation happening in there. Murugan then shows the proof to the police and they arrest Thiruttani. Although Murugan accomplishes his mission, Aruna dismisses him. So Murugan takes challenge to continue to work here. Murugan makes things rough on Aruna's family. Murugan's mother is worried about her son, so she comes there and faints after seeing Aruna. Murugan's mother is actually Aruna's daughter. In the past Murugan's mother married a poor laborer and Aruna didn't accept it. Meera and Devi fall in love with Murugan. Murugan makes a big drama to reduce Aruna's ego. In the meantime, Thiruttani escapes from jail and kidnaps Aruna. Murugan saves his grandmother and Aruna apologizes to her daughter.

== Cast ==
- Prabhu as Murugan alias Mr. Madras
- Sukanya as Meera
- Vineetha as Devi
- Manorama as Aruna Arunachalam
- Lakshmi as Janaki
- Anandaraj as Thiruttani
- Goundamani as Govindsamy
- Senthil as Ponnusamy
- R. Sundarrajan as Aruna's son
- Kavitha as Mahalakshmi
- Kaka Radhakrishnan as Arunachalam
- Gandhimathi as Alamelu
- Thyagu as a police constable
- Santhana Bharathi as a police inspector
- Mohan Raman as Doctor

== Soundtrack ==
The soundtrack were composed by Vidyasagar, with lyrics written by Vaali.

| Song | Singers | Duration |
|---|---|---|
| "Akka Maga" | Mano, K. S. Chitra | 4:34 |
| "Unnai Parthathum" | Swarnalatha | 4:05 |
| "Pala Naadu Parkuthu" | S. P. Balasubrahmanyam, Sindhu, Swarnalatha | 4:28 |
| "Poga Sonna" | Mano | 4:44 |
| "Poongatru Veesum" | S. P. Balasubrahmanyam | 4:05 |
| "Antha Otha Madi" | Mano, Sujatha Mohan, Surekha Kothari | 4:27 |

== Reception ==
D. S. Ramanujam of The Hindu wrote, "Director P. Vasu, who has penned the story, dialogue and screenplay, has introduced enough cinematic twists and turns in the plot which he sometimes employs diligently; most times the viewer easily predicts the turns".
