= Ladies Doctor =

- Title card
- Directed by: Ramu
- Written by: L. B. Sriram (dialogues)
- Screenplay by: Satya Murthy; Maharaja
- Story by: C. Kalyan
- Produced by: B. Vanaja; C. Kalyan (Presents)
- Starring: Rajendra Prasad; Vineetha; Keerthana
- Cinematography: N. V. Suresh Kumar
- Edited by: K. Ramesh
- Music by: Vidyasagar
- Production company: Sri Ammulya Art Productions
- Release date: 15 June 1996
- Running time: 119 mins
- Country: India
- Language: Telugu

Ladies Doctor is a 1996 Indian Telugu-language comedy film, produced by B. Vanaja and C. Kalyan under the Sri Ammulya Art Productions banner and directed by Ramu. It stars Rajendra Prasad, Vineetha, Keerthana and music composed by Vidyasagar.

== Cast ==
- Rajendra Prasad as Dr. Ram Prasad
- Vineetha as Janaki
- Keerthana as Rani
- Brahmanandam as Compounder
- Babu Mohan as Pashanna Swamy
- A.V.S as Rani's father
- Costume Krishna as Ghoshanna Swamy
- Rallapalli as Janaki's father
- K.Ashok Kumar as Ramadasu
- Vallabhaneni Janardhan as 30-60-Patta-Katti
- M. S. Narayana as Drunkard
- Kallu Chidambaram as a Marriage broker
- Jagga Rao as House owner
- Ramya Krishna as Ramya (Special appearance)
- Rajitha as Nurse
- Poojitha
- Athili Lakshmi as Janaki's mother
- Ratna Sagar as Janaki's grandmother
- Y. Vijaya as Rani's mother

== Soundtrack ==
Ladies Doctor

Film score by Vidyasagar
- Released: 1996
- Genre: Soundtrack
- Length: 23:47
- Label: VE Audio
- Producer: Vidyasagar

Vidyasagar chronology
Mummy Mee Aayanochadu (1996)	Ladies Doctor (1996)	Akkum Bakkum (1996)

Music composed by Vidyasagar. Music released on VE Audio Company. The song "Chali Gali" is based on Vidyasagar's own song "Adi Aathi" which he composed for Tamil film Pasumpon (1995) and "Oh Akashavani" is based on his another song "Oh Na Ennanu" from Ayudha Poojai (1995).

No.	Title	Lyrics	Singer(s)	Length
1.	"O Aakasavaani"	Sirivennela Sitarama Sastry	Mano, K.S.Chithra	4:02
2.	"Chali Gali"	Sirivennela Sitarama Sastry	Mano, Chitra	2:33
3.	"Vydhya Narayana Hari"	Sriharsha	S. P. Balasubrahmanyam, Rajendra Prasad	3:45
4.	"Yeneneno Nomulunochi"	Sriharsha	Swarnalatha	4:34
5.	"Etupakka Chakkani Bomma"	Sriharsha	S. P. Balasubrahmanyam, Sujatha Mohan, Swarnalatha	4:00
6.	"Ammoru (Remix)"	Sriharsha	S. P. Sailaja, Sindhu	4:53
Total length:				23:47
