= Engalukkum Kaalam Varum (2001 film) =

2001 film by Balaruban

- VCD cover
- Directed by: Balaruban
- Written by: Balaruban
- Produced by: K. Prabhakaran
- Starring: Livingston; Kausalya; Vadivelu; Vivek
- Cinematography: P. S. Selvam
- Edited by: R. Sridhar
- Music by: Deva
- Production company: Anbalaya Films
- Release date: 9 February 2001
- Running time: 145 minutes
- Country: India
- Language: Tamil

Engalukkum Kaalam Varum (transl. Our time will come) is a 2001 Indian Tamil-language comedy drama film directed by Balaruban. The film stars Livingston, Kausalya, Vadivelu and Vivek. It was released on 9 February 2001.

== Plot ==
Kuppan, after losing his mother, comes from the village to live with the family of his uncle Mannangatti in the city. Mannangatti works abroad for his family. Mannangatti has three daughters : Lakshmi, a soft-spoken girl, and arrogant city girls Pooja and Teja, and a son Vellaiyan who wants to get married as fast as possible. When Mannangatti comes back from abroad, he decides to arrange his children's marriage. Pooja marries the rich NRI Santhosh and Teja marries Ramesh, a government employee, who wants to make it big in life. Vellaiyan falls in love with Jennifer and marries her. While Lakshmi refuses to marry the person her father has chosen and marries her cousin Kuppan secretly. What transpires later forms the crux of the story.

== Cast ==
- Livingston as Kuppan
- Kausalya as Lakshmi
- Vadivelu as Vellaiyan
- Vivek as Santhosh
- Karan as Ramesh
- Kasthuri as Pooja
- Kovai Sarala as Jennifer
- Vineetha as Teja
- Manivannan as Mannangatti
- Pramila Joshai as Baagiyam, Mannangatti's wife
- Pandu as Ramesh's friend
- Thyagu
- Vijay Krishnaraj as Kuppan's Friend
- Kumarimuthu as Jennifer's father
- Bayilvan Ranganathan
- Crane Manohar as Jennifer's relative
- Bhuvaneswari
- Master Arun
- Radhika Chaudhari in a guest appearance

== Soundtrack ==
The soundtrack was composed by Deva.

Song	Singer(s)	Lyrics	Duration
"Ambilaikku Theriyum"	Sirkazhi G. Sivachidambaram, Swarnalatha	Kalidasan	3:54
"Ambilaikku Theriyum"	A. L. Raghavan, Swarnalatha	Kalidasan	3:55
"Devu Devuda"	Mano	Ponniyin Selvan	5:06
"Engalukkum Kalam Varum"	Deva	Piraisoodan	4:13
"Indhandai Central Jailu"	Sabesh	Kalidasan	4:56
"Vennai Thirudum Kanna"	Anuradha Sriram	P. Vijay	5:09

== Reception ==
S. R. Ashok Kumar of The Hindu wrote "A dialogue-based film which tries to deliver a message but sags in the second half". Malini Mannath of Chennai Online wrote "When the story is run-of the-mill and the treatment is insipid, at times one gets some relief from the comedy track and team. But when the comedy team itself is allowed a free run on the screen like unbridled horses, then what results is chaos and mayhem. 'Engalukkum Kaalam Varum' is one such film".
