= Georgy Samchenko =

Russian Soviet poet and critic (1940–2002)

Georgy Dmitrievich Samchenko
- Born: January 25, 1940; Melitopol, Zaporizhzhia Oblast, Ukrainian Soviet Socialist Republic
- Died: August 13, 2002 (aged 62)
- Occupations: Poet, translator, critic
- Writing career
- Pen name: Yegor Samchenko

Georgy Dmitrievich Samchenko (literary pseudonym Yegor Samchenko; January 25, 1940, Melitopol, Zaporizhzhia Oblast —August 13, 2002) was a Russian Soviet poet, translator, and literary critic of the 1970s–1990s.

He was graduated from the Zaporizhzhia Medical Institute as a psychiatrist. He worked for the Simferopol newspaper Krymsky Komsomolets. He lived in the Moscow region, in the city of Solnechnogorsk. From 1973, he served as the chief psychiatrist of the Solnechnogorsky District of the Moscow Oblast. He studied in the poetry seminar of Yevgeny Yevtushenko. Years later, Yevtushenko included Samchenko's poems in his one-volume anthology Strophes of the Century. He was a favorite student of Boris Slutsky and one of the poets most highly regarded by Alexander Mezhirov.

He was a member of the Union of Writers of the USSR, and worked as a literary critic for the magazine Smena. He authored three poetry collections published during Soviet times: Hard Carriage (1975), I Help to Live (1987), and Faces of Freedom (1989). In the post-Soviet era, Samchenko's poetry became unclaimed. His work elicited varied responses from critics; however, among poets and critics who valued his work, it was believed that his most significant creation was the poem Ivan the Terrible, written in the 1970s. Due to frequent references to literary classics, his poems became the subject of poetic parodies by Alexander Ivanov, Alexey Pyanov, and others, while Yevgeny Yevtushenko, Mikhail Sinelnikov, Felix Medvedev, and other poets and critics praised his poetry.

He was published in the newspapers Komsomolskaya Pravda and Literaturnaya Gazeta, and in newspapers and magazines Znamya, Yunost, Oktyabr, Smena, Ogonyok, Nash Sovremennik,Literaturnaya Uchyoba, Kuban, as well as in the almanacs Poetry, Day of Poetry, and Russia's Heart. Ideologically, his work is associated with contemporary pochvennichestvo (a Russian literary and ideological movement emphasizing national roots), though among conservative patriotic writers, the Solnechnogorsk poet held his own distinct position. Samchenko's language is studied by cultural scholars and linguists. He is remembered by contemporaries for his poetic talent and volatile personality, which made communication with him challenging. In his later years, he suffered from alcoholism, that provided ample material for memoirists, leading to contradictory judgments about his poetic skills. From the mid-1990s, information about him became scarce, his work was forgotten, and his death went unnoticed. However, since the 2010s, interest in Yegor Samchenko's personality and work has been reviving within Russian literary circles.

== Literary biography ==
Samchenko was born on January 25, 1940 in Melitopol, Ukraine. His father, Dmitry Ivanovich Samchenko, a frontline soldier, was born in 1908. According to some sources, he was a junior lieutenant in the 29th Separate Cadet Rifle Brigade, and killed in the Battle of Moscow on November 26, 1941, and buried in a mass grave in the city of Yakhroma. Other sources claim that the poet's father died in the Battle of Stalingrad, while a third account states that Dmitry Samchenko served as a platoon commander in the Second Separate Rifle Battalion of the First Guards Rifle Brigade, rose to the rank of lieutenant, and died on February 18, 1943, during the Battle of Leningrad. He was a Kuban Cossack from the hamlet of Kharkovsky in the Nevinnomyssky District of the Ordzhonikidze Krai, married to Pelageya Ivanovna Samchenko. (Note: The poem Frost and Sun: The Chimes Are Ringing, which opens the poet's debut collection, Hard Wagon. According to the biographical data published in the book, George had a younger brother who died during the war at five months of age (poem And Remembered Still...).)

In the 1960s, adopting the literary pseudonym Yegor Samchenko, he began publishing in the Simferopol youth newspaper Krymsky Komsomolets. The Krymsky Komsomolets literary studio included, besides Yegor, writers Ruslan Kireev, poet Vladimir Lentsov, and playwright Valentin Krymko, who at the time went by the surname Gurevich and later by Pridatko. All of them later moved to Moscow and became members of the Union of Writers of the USSR. Before becoming an established poet, Georgy used to work as a laborer, soldier, and was a student.

After graduating from the Zaporizhzhia Medical Institute in 1964, Georgy lived in Solnechnogorsk at Baranova Street, 24/9, apt. 47, where he served as the chief psychiatrist of the Solnechnogorsky District of the Moscow Oblast. The psychoneurological department of the Solnechnogorsk District Hospital was established in 1973. In the spring of 1972, together with poets from the Literary Studio at the Moscow City Organization of the All-Union Leninist Communist Youth League: Boris Kamianov, Viktor Gofman, and Sergey Goncharenko, he attended a literary seminar led by Yevgeny Yevtushenko, who held a high opinion of the aspiring poet's skill. In the fall of 1972, Yevtushenko handed his students over to Boris Slutsky, another poet of the Sixtiers generation and a colleague from joint poetry evening at the Polytechnic Museum. For the next few years, they studied under him. The group was joined by Olesya Nikolaeva, Olga Chugai, Gennady Kalashnikov, Yevgeny Blazheevsky, Garry Gordon, Viktor Korkia, and others.

The aspiring poet's first book of poems —Hard Carriage— was published in 1975 by the Sovremennik publishing house, and in 1976, after the release of just one book, he was accepted into the Union of Writers of the USSR. In the late 1970s and early 1980s, Samchenko worked as a critic for the magazine Smena. In 1978, the magazine organized its first single-poem competition under the motto I Sing My Fatherland, and Samchenko's task was to review poetic manuscripts sent to the editorial office from across the Soviet Union. He submitted the selected manuscripts for evaluation to the magazine's editor-in-chief, Albert Likhanov. A similar reader's competition was later held by the newspaper Komsomolskaya Pravda. In Smena, the poet-critic published a review of the collection Spring by Pravda publishing house in 1980, which featured winners of the newspaper's poetry contest. However, some time later, the poet lost his job at Smena and was dismissed from the editorial staff. (Note: M. I. Sinelnikov writes that Samchenko was expelled for unsanitary pranks: he urinated in the wastebasket "with rejected poems, which probably deserved such treatment". Sinelnikov's partiality to Samchenko allows him, on the one hand, to consider that the surname Samchenko is unsound and indecent, and its owner was an idler making immodest proposals to servant ladies, and on the other hand, to call the poems about Ivan the Terrible brilliant.) His next book, I Help to Live, was published in 1987 by Soviet Writer. As noted in the book's annotation, it is permeated with a sense of history (poems such as The Solitude of Dmitry Donskoy, Ivan the Terrible, Avvakum's Bonfire, and other poems from the section Russian, Russia). In the same year, Yegor Samchenko engaged in a dialogue with writer Daniil Granin about perestroika.

The third book, Faces of Freedom, was published in 1989, again by Sovremennik. The collection was named after a poem published in the previous book. The publisher's annotation described the new book as sharply social, with its lyrical theme spanning from Pythagoras to N. F. Fyodorov. It included some works from the previous collection I Help to Live (Autumn Priapus, Lenin, The Secret of Blok, Sparrow, On Saturday, at the End of the Day..., and others). Unlike the two previous books, the author included his own preface, in which he shared some creative principles. He described how the poem The Secret of Blok was created: "When I was writing The Secret of Blok, I was a bearer of Blok". He linked ecology and ethics topics: "It seems to me that thought is a completely moral organization, absolutely excluding evil. That's not enough. A collective field of morality is required, under which, perhaps, superconductivity is only possible. <...> By solving the problem of ecology, we protect ourselves. It's very possible that we are not only protecting ourselves".

In his final years, according to M. I. Sinelnikov, Yegor Samchenko was addicted to alcohol, lost his job, and was abandoned by his wife and daughter, with his few remaining friends turning away. All those events are reflected in many lines of the book titled I Help to Live, published in 1987. The fallen poet pestered Sinelnikov and Alexander Mezhirov with late-night calls. Out of pity for Samchenko's plight, Mikhail Sinelnikov lent him a substantial sum of money without conditions, enough to last several months, but Samchenko squandered it in a few days. Upon learning of Sinelnikov's failed patronage, poet Yevgeny Rein reproached him: "How could you give money to someone like <...> Samchenko!"

After that, Sinelnikov and Mezhirov decided not to support Samchenko's addiction with money, but to provide him with work. Alexander Mezhirov suggested that Samchenko translate poems from Yiddish by Aron Vergelis. A secondary goal was to temper Samchenko's antisemitism. The idea was that the "instinctive fears of a Little Russian toward Jewry" would dissipate through direct interaction with the editor-in-chief of the magazine Sovetish Heymland, who also promised a decent fee for the work. However, Samchenko's translations were deemed unsatisfactory, and Vergelis refused to publish them.

Still being published in the 1990s, in the magazine Nash Sovremennik, Yegor Samchenko soon became unclaimed there as well. He died in obscurity, as reported in a blog by his fellow student from the literary seminars of Yevgeny Yevtushenko and Boris Slutsky, Georgy Yelin. A decade after the publication in Yevgeny Yevtushenko's poetic anthology, few remembered Samchenko except his poet friends. However, a Russian language and literature teacher from Kazan, F. Kh. Mustafina, when teaching the topic of Vocabulary, suggested that her students read a poem by "a certain poet E. Samchenko" titled So Freely, Somehow Light!... (Note: It was first published in the almanac Day of Poetry in 1972 and later concluding the collection Hard Carriage in 1975.) In her article Language Culture as Part of National Culture, published in the proceedings of the republican scientific-practical conference "Russian Language as a State Language in the National-Regional Conditions of Tatarstan" on December 7, 2007, she notes that this poem by Yegor Samchenko, despite its pathetically enthusiastic tone, provoked a storm of indignation among her students.

In the 2000s and 2010s, his contemporaries' memoirs began to be published (M. I. Sinelnikov, G. A. Yelin, O. A. Nikolaeva, Y. M. Polyakov, S. K. Vermisheva). Poet and entrepreneur D. A. Mizgulin, on the occasion of the 75th anniversary of Victory, initiated the publication of a fifteen-volume poetic anthology War and Peace edited by B. I. Lukin as part of the publishing project Literary Fund Road of Life. In the ninth book of this anthology, for the first time in twenty-five years since Yevgeny Yevtushenko's publication in Strophes of the Century (not counting the publication of translations into Russian of the crown of sonnets The Trunk of Life by Chuvash poet N. A. Tevetkel in the magazine Lik in 2011), a selection of four poems by Yegor Samchenko dedicated to the war theme was published: Frost and Sun. The Chimes Strike...; I Still Remember, // How During the War...; Uncle Fedya; Interview with Pokryshkin. The publication included a brief biographical note, which, due to the scarcity of information, listed Samchenko's death date as 1994 (the date of his last publication in Nash Sovremennik) with a question mark.

== Artistic work and criticism ==
=== Failures in Poetic Translations ===
In collaboration with Igor Shklyarevsky, Samchenko translated poems from Turkmen by Italmaz Nuryev (1976). He translated the poems of Georgian poet Simon Chikovani alone for the Poet's Library (Major Series, 1983). Despite the favor shown to Yegor Samchenko by literary luminaries, his work often became the subject of criticism from fellow writers. He was reproached for the inaccuracy of his poetic translations. Poet and journalist Stanislav Zolotsev reviewed the joint poetic translations by Shklyarevsky and Samchenko in the magazine Druzhba Narodov. While generally approving of Igor Shklyarevsky's work, the critic noted that the Turkmen poet's poems seem as if written by two different people, and the issue lies not with Nuryev but with his translators. "Against the backdrop of Shklyarevsky's work, the lackluster quality of the pages worked on by Yegor Samchenko stands out. His translations bear traces of haste, and certain poetic lines sound with an accent".

The critic was outraged that Samchenko translated not one or two but thirty-five poems by the Georgian poet in this manner. Ilya Dadashidze remarked that if the late Simon Ivanovich could have seen such translation attempts, he would have reiterated his opinion about poetry translators: "I ask that I not be translated at all". In connection with Samchenko's Georgian translations, Ilya Dadashidze mentioned an article in the magazine Literaturnaya Gruziya titled How Not to Translate, authored by poet, literary critic, and scholar Tatyana Bek. The reviewer wrote that Samchenko's translations of Simon Chikovani's poetry distorted the original beyond recognition (e.g., "naked beauty" became "beauty of nudity" and so on), were unscrupulous and filled Chikovani's poems with Samchenko's own additions.

In 1984, the publishing house Sovremennik released a book by Yakut poet Savva Tarasov —On the Banks of Sine—, translated by E. Samchenko, N. Kondakova, and I. Bekhterev. Translator Marina Tishchenko responded to its release in the magazine Polar Star. She expressively characterized Samchenko's difficulty with combining phrases as foolish, and added: "There is no need to talk about possible Yakuts ancestors, when the translator has problems even with Russian grammar".

=== Critics ===
Samchenko's original poetry was also criticized. For instance, Stanislav Rassadin was not impressed by his first book of poems Hard Carriage, and also disliked the "touching fraternization" with M. Yu. Lermontov. The critic then fully reproduced Samchenko's eight-line poem beginning with the line And the French poet asked..., accompanying it with an ironic remark: "This is not a fragment, this is the entire poem. I leave it to the curious to satisfy themselves by digging into this mysterious picture and guessing what it depicts". The third work that puzzled the critic was the poem Coat. It was dedicated to an episode where Boris Slutsky gifted Yegor a new coat, but the details of this event were not clear from Samchenko's poem. As a result, the critic found no kind words for Samchenko's debut collection: "There's no reason to reproach Yegor Samchenko. Everyone is entitled to write as they can. But I have a grievance with the book's two editors. And with the third, the author of the enthusiastic foreword, Igor Shklyarevsky, who wrote that the book was written with a confident hand..."

Stanislav Rassadin had rejected Yegor Samchenko's poetry for years. Twelve years later, the critic was similar. This time, he chose the poem "On Saturday, at the end of the day, a bright spirit entered me..." to illustrate the poetic ineptitude of the reviewed poet. The critic's disappointment was not lessened by the fact that the poem was published "in a good magazine" (Samchenko's poem was printed in the perestroika-era Ogonyok). The critic exclaimed: "'I remember, recalled... And to grown children, excuse me...' — one could clutch their head". Meanwhile, he passed over in silence Samchenko's poem Ivan the Terrible," which was positively evaluated by Diana Tevekelyan, Mikhail Sinelnikov, and Alexander Mezhirov. Critical judgments about Samchenko's poetry were also expressed by T. Parshina, G. Krasukhin, E. Kalmanovsky, S. Zolotsev.

Critic Gennady Krasukhin had doubts about the same poems criticized by Stanislav Rassadin: And the French poet asked..., Longing for Lermontov, and also the poem And the friend of the steppes, Kalmyk: allusions to Lermontov and Pushkin. In the first case, his dissatisfaction stemmed from the obscurity of the poetic thought; the author clearly overdid it, camouflaging his poetic leitmotif from readers. In the second case, G. G. Krasukhin argued that Samchenko lacks sensibility. The less sensibility a poet has, the more self-conceit and self-absorption he writes. According to the critic, the third poem also suffers from the lack of sensibility: a system of heterogeneous allusions referring to Pushkin's poetry (Moldavia and Friend of the steppes, the Kalmyk) is not cohesive. Like Stanislav Rassadin, Gennady Krasukhin blamed the editors of the Sovremennik publishing house, Leonid Vyunik and Sergey Susha, for allowing what he considered imperfect poems.

Stanislav Zolotsev, who negatively assessed Yegor Samchenko's translation efforts, neither accepted the aspiring poet's original verses. In a review of young authors' poetry, Their Words About Their Time, he echoed Soviet criticism regarding the secondary nature of the poet's inspiration, following classical poetry models, and the absence of an original system of imagery: "It's worse when books are published that are so colorless and imitative in essence that it's hard to understand — what, besides the desire to be published, drove the author". He considered the book Hard Carriage among the most unsuccessful examples of this kind. Comparing the creative debuts of poets Oleg Kochetkov and Yegor Samchenko, the critic concluded that while Kochetkov's "repetitions and echoes seem accidental", Samchenko "clearly and openly emphasizes 'borrowing' individual thoughts, findings, and entire lines from the classics". "Could it be that, to express anxiety and sadness over fleeting youth and unfulfilled dreams, the author couldn't find a single word of his own?" wondered Stanislav Zolotsev. However, Samchenko's other poems also mentioned an emotional response in him: "What follows are entire pages of 'texts' —you can't call them poems— that often carry neither the signs of the times, nor reflections on them, nor even any traits of a contemporary's spiritual existence. The author, immersed in narrowly personal reflection, seems unwilling to present his thoughts to the reader in their proper form".

If the polemical fervor of S. B. Rassadin, G. G. Krasukhin, and S. A. Zolotsev was sparked by Samchenko's poems, poet and literary scholar Igor Volgin criticized Yegor's manner of writing poetic reviews, particularly drawing attention to his essay Stop, Moment, You Are Beautiful. Notes on New Books by Young Poets in the almanac Poetry, written in his characteristic expressive style: "When the pulse of our time is so rapid, so urgently agitated, and time, clinging to the blazing tail of a launching rocket, rushes off, crashing into the stars, when we are all so concerned about events in the Middle East, and universal thought, now half-deity, now half-beast, recalls with a smile flintlock rifles and cavalry battles, when greatness retreats into logarithms, and the living crystal of information is so paradoxical — compressing, mind-bogglingly expanding...," <then> "the present day of our young poetry excites me not only as a reader of poems but also as... a citizen". The reviewer asked if that was a school essay or a literary parody, and refused to believe that this is an article about poetry. In the reviewed article Stop, Moment, You Are Beautiful, which provoked Volgin's negative reaction, Yegor Samchenko criticized the poems of Igor Volgin as well.

Critic Valentin Kamenev shared Igor Volgin's opinion. In his review of the article by the Solnechnogorsk doctor, who, in V. F. Kamenev's characterization, spoke no less than on behalf of "the culture of the Russian poetic word" but had a rather vague notion of modesty and tact, the critic noted that Yegor Samchenko, adopting a haughty and careless pose, condescendingly reproached bold young poets "with an exhaustive presence of an absence of poetic fate and an uncommon expression," although the books of these authors deserved the most serious criticism. Valentin Kamenev added that Samchenko surely reveled in his own eloquence, but his authorial style was far from ideal, as Yegor's article was filled with clichés and turns characteristic of the era of so-called propagand criticism. Critic L. G. Baranova-Gonchenko, in the article Romantic Cloak and Patched Jacket, reproached Yegor Samchenko (along with Sergey Kunyaev) for indifference to the work of young Soviet poets of the 1980s: "Prefacing a discussion about the new poetic wave, poet E. Samchenko and critic S. Kunyaev show persistent unanimity in failing to notice the 'uncommon expression' of the new generation's face. And in vain". Baranova-Gonchenko's article was published in the third issue of the magazine Literaturnaya Uchyoba and addressed Samchenko's articles Wave? Yes, as an Uncertainty and Kunyaev's Well-Learned Lesson, published in the previous issue of the same Literaturnaya Uchyoba, which polemically touched on the issue of the "new wave" of poetry in the 1980s.

Among the few sympathetic critics who highlighted both the positive and negative aspects of Yegor Samchenko's work was Leningrad writer and theater scholar Yevgeny Solomonovich Kalmanovsky. In a separate article, Poems — Words or Deeds?, dedicated to analyzing Samchenko's book Hard Carriage, he wrote that the book has a good title, though it does not reflect the essence of its author's creative principles. The title Hard Carriage evokes everyday, mundane, and quite democratic associations in the reader, whereas the author's poems are predominantly complex, lofty monologues about himself. According to the critic, it would have been preferable to name the debut book My heart met the sky... after a line from the poem I fell, rose, smiled... published in the book.

Samchenko is characterized by "a unity of outward excitability with an inevitable soaring of the soul", sometimes the former prevails, sometimes the latter. His poetic language is not simple but almost always convoluted. The meaning of some lines is hard to grasp, and the poet's love for artificially complicating simple things leads to affectation that can only irritates. For example, in the poem And the friend of the steppes, Kalmyk, he has the line But I did not drain the ink. One can drain only a container: a glass, a goblet, and so on. Like many other critics of Samchenko's poetry, the poem And the French poet asked... also left E. S. Kalmanovsky perplexed.

Other features of Samchenko's work noted by E. S. Kalmanovsky include refrains: "blue gazes", "azure of eyes", "earth's axis", "axis of the earth", and so on. According to the critic, the poet clearly prioritizes flashy verbal presentation and beautiful form at the expense of deep content: "But when poems are words, not deeds, there is no famous living water that fuses everything together in a shared breath". The critic emphasized the importance of utilizing the full scope of the author's spiritual life so that his poems are not merely a form of cultural relaxation. Otherwise, when, for example, the poet writes about friendship, his love for friends appears declarative and fails to evoke empathy. Samchenko's poems reveal his familiarity with the important examples of Russian and foreign poetry, but through Yegor's verbal declarations, one does not sense a personal attitude, personal understanding, or the essence of his own associations with classical poems; his poems resemble a collection of various poetic voices.

The critic then made routine critical remarks about the poems Frost and Sun. The Chimes Strike..., Longing for Lermontov, as well as previously unaddressed criticisms of Samchenko's poem Response — a paraphrase of The Raven by Edgar Poe, and And the sea. And the native skies — inspired by Lermontov's Sail. However, the critic notes, besides echoes of other poets, the book Hard Carriage contains lines that are perceived as independent poetic acts rather than imitations of unattainable models (poems I so want to renounce myself..., The last embrace of Indian summer... and some others), and these inspire some optimism.

A positive review of Yegor Samchenko's poetry was left by writer Felix Medvedev. In a review of the 1982 Day of Poetry anthology, which included Samchenko's poems I choose the malice of the day. So don't hold it against me... and You, my dear ones, you're unlikely to turn away...,/ the critic noted the interesting and original poems Samchenko had written recently: "In his poems, one increasingly feels that noble polysemy, depth of thought, and temperament that distinguish a true poet from a versifier". The reviewer reproached detractors of this distinctive poet for often focusing on Samchenko's early poetic works in their search for negatives, overlooking the seriousness of his latest works, which deserve the most serious attention, "professionally competent analysis, and editorial attention".

Yevgeny Yevtushenko admired Yegor Samchenko's poetry from the moment the latter appeared in the poetry seminar of the Literary Studio at the MGC Komsomol in 1972. According to the recollections of Samchenko's seminar classmate Georgy Yelin, the recognized luminary lavished compliments on the poetic metaphors in Samchenko's poems Judo and The Ink Ran Out at Night: "'The water is full-breasted in the glass jug' — an excellent line! 'The curtain caught a chill' — top marks! 'Your photograph closed its eyes' — simply great! And this is outright genius: '...and the pine table rustled'! Only Zabolotsky could have dared such boldness!" Twenty-three years later, in the annotation to Samchenko's poems published by Yevtushenko in his 1995 poetic anthology "Strophes of the Century," the compiler wrote: "Exposed, as a poet, to raw nerves. One of Alexander Mezhirov's favorite poets".

According to M. I. Sinelnikov, there could not have been many poems that brought Yegor Samchenko fame as an outstanding poet: these are poems about approaching death, featuring the image of a grave over which a Judish wife leans, about a mother who washed floors in a Stalinist prison (the poem I bow to glory... from the book I Help to Live, 1987), about the dying Alexander Blok (the poem The Secret of Blok from the books I Help to Live, 1987, and Faces of Freedom, 1989), about the Persian poet-Sufi Jalaluddin Rumi, and about an unfortunate Jew married to a fatal Russian woman. Sinelnikov likens these poems by Yegor Samchenko to Pasternak's image of passion as electrical wires under voltage, striking fatally: "We are wires under current!" The critic conveys his impression of Samchenko's poetry: "It seemed to me that such fierce sensuality, such temperament had not yet existed in Russian poetry. Perhaps in Samchenko, this was not Russian — rather Ukrainian, Shevchenkian?" He considers Samchenko's most outstanding work to be the poem dedicated to Ivan the Terrible, despite the fact that its rhythm was borrowed from the poetry of A. K. Tolstoy, but in Samchenko's hands, it turned out far more powerful.

=== Parodies ===
Yegor's abundant use of iconic images from classical literature often made his work the subject of mockery by parodists. Parodies of Yegor Samchenko's poems were written by Anatoly Filippov, Vladilen Prudovsky, Viktor Zavadsky, Alexey Pyanov, Alexander Ivanov. Alexander Ivanov's parody Star to Himself performed by the author, was broadcast on Central Television on September 15, 1978, in the first episode of the television program Around the Laughter. In this parody, the image of an unlucky poet reading poems not with his tongue but with his hands emerges. Poet Nikolai Glazkov, in turn, wrote the poem Deaf-Mutes, which plays on the image of a deaf-mute poet.

The humorous magazine Krokodil also did not miss the opportunity to capitalize on a convenient plot for parody. In 1978, in an essay by satirical writer Vladimir Volin, Arm in Arm with a Classic, Krokodil criticized Samchenko's much-loved-by-parodists poem Longing for Lermontov: "You can draw readers' attention in different ways. One method is to take a classic by the arm. It doesn't matter if it's familiar; standing next to a great figure, you somehow become taller yourself. [...] Thus, the young poet Yegor Samchenko, on the pages of the 1975 Day of Poetry anthology, stepped onto the road, taking Mikhail Yuryevich Lermontov by the arm. And you can't fault him: indeed, both were 27!" However, the Krokodil journalist was mistaken: in 1975, Samchenko was not 27 but 35 years old. In the same essay, the magazine also mocked the ambition of poet Igor Volgin (who had criticized Yegor Samchenko's essayistic style) to lean on the classics through Pushkinian allusions.

== Worldview. Language ==
Ideologically, Yegor Samchenko was aligned with the right wing of the Soviet Writers' Union and maintained close ties with writers of the so-called "patriotic" movement, including V. V. Kozhinov, S. Yu. Kunyaev, and others. In 1980, he dedicated an article titled Beauty and Utility to the work of the latter, published in the magazine Ogonyok. In it, Samchenko wrote sympathetically about the spontaneous and selfless sense of civic duty in his poet-friend's work. Samchenko shared with Stanislav Yuryevich an interest in Russian history, particularly the Battle of Kulikovo and Dmitry Donskoy, as well as the poetry of Pushkin, Lermontov, Blok, Yesenin, Zabolotsky, and Smelyakov. In this article, Samchenko demonstrated a degree of independence from the views of the influential secretary of the Moscow Writers' Organization. For instance, he disagreed with Kunyaev's accusations against Osip Mandelstam: "True, sometimes Kunyaev is overly categorical in his comparisons. (I note in parentheses that categoricalness is not only a resounding but also an argument to discuss. Comparing Yesenin and Mandelstam, calling Mandelstam 'stuck' in poetic secondariness, Kunyaev is no less categorical than Tynyanov, whom he criticizes for 'erasing' Blok as a tradition and calling Yesenin's poetry a 'resounding coin, often... counterfeit')". Samchenko's love for Mandelstam's poetry and his distinctive position within the conservative camp were later noted by Mikhail Sinelnikov.

Ten years later, during the perestroika years, when Soviet society began engaging in public discussions on a wide range of topics, Samchenko spoke out against an article by literary scholar D. M. Urnov in the newspaper Pravda, titled Mad Overstepping of One's Strength, which condemned Boris Pasternak's novel Doctor Zhivago (Pravda, April 22, 1988). The materials from the discussion about the late writer's novel were compiled in the collection Doctor Zhivago by Boris Pasternak, published in 1990. Among the varied responses to the Pravda article from economists, engineers, pensioners, and military personnel, Yegor Samchenko's negative review was highlighted by the collection's compilers L. V. Bakhnov and L. B. Voronin as the opinion of an ordinary, untitled reader rather than an authoritative statement from a member of the Writers' Union, literary critic, or renowned poet, whose influence in 1990 was likened by Alexander Mezhirov to that of Andrei Voznesensky, Joseph Brodsky, and Bella Akhmadulina: "Thirty years ago, editorial mail about Doctor Zhivago included letters saying: I haven't read the novel, but I don't accept it. Similar responses are received today. But they sound like this: 'I haven't read Doctor Zhivago yet, but D. Urnov's article is a bad article'. The author of this letter, E. Samchenko from Solnechnogorsk, does note, however, that he is familiar with other prose works by B. Pasternak".

Philologist and cultural scholar G. Ch. Huseynov, in his work Soviet Ideologemes in Russian Discourse of the 1990s, analyzing the perception of Russian profanity by representatives of various strata of the Russian intelligentsia, distinguishes variants of liberal-Western, official-Western, and official-pochvennichestvo (i.e., conservative-folk) linguistic purism. He attributes M. M. Zhvanevsky to the first group, I. L. Volgin (Note: In the 1970s, Igor Volgin reproached Yegor for the unrestrained slogan of a literary essay. In the 1990s, Volgin revealed a broader approach to profanity than even the "parodic" Samchenko. He said, "Take care of the profanity vocabulary! Guard it from being absorbed into literature! This outstanding national phenomenon deserves to live an independent life. Cultural integration is murderous for it". G. Ch. Huseynov supported the Dostoevskovite's reasoning with his own remark: "What this independent life is, however, is not specified".) to the second, and unequivocally places Yegor Samchenko in the third group: "Some people see in the expanding use of profanity a threat to the foundations of folk life with its familiar and convenient segregation of 'high' and 'low,' 'official,' 'white,' festive existence and 'underground,' 'black,' mundane vegetating". To illustrate his thesis, the scholar cites a poem by Samchenko, written in response to the October 1993 events in Moscow and published in the magazine Nash Sovremennik:

The angry one is everywhere. Everywhere the democracy-profanity.

And five memorial candles are standing by the wall.

If snipers are in the tank,

Sleep peacefully, Ostankino...

Since Yegor's family —Dmitry Ivanovich and Pelageya Ivanovna Samchenko— originated from the Kuban, archaic and dialectal words in his historically oriented poems were used in 1998 by the compiler of an author's dictionary of the Kuban dialect, P. I. Tkachenko. When publishing the poem Your Faithful Wife Golovata in the collection I Help to Live, Samchenko provided his own commentary to clarify certain historical realities: who Anton Golovaty was, what a "figure" (a tall pole with a torch at the end) meant, and so on. Pyotr Tkachenko used the word "zalogа" from Samchenko's poetic vocabulary in his dictionary, explaining that in the Kuban, a zaloga referred to a border post manned by one or two Cossacks or a type of Cossack border service. This was followed by a poetic example of the word "zalogi" from Samchenko's book: "And, like the light at the zalogi of Labinskaya".

== Contemporaries on Yegor Samchenko ==
The memory of Yegor Samchenko endures due to his extravagant manner of interacting with fellow poets. Memoirists unanimously agree that Samchenko was a born psychiatrist and, at the same time, a highly gifted poet, a quality that permeated everything he did. For instance, Georgy Yelin recalled a humorous incident during Boris Slutsky's seminar when an alcoholic, confused by a sign reading "Comradely Court" above the studio door, wandered into the poetry class. Only Yegor Samchenko, leveraging his professional skills as a psychiatrist, managed to rid the audience of the persistent intruder.

Another notable episode involved Yaroslav Smelyakov. In the Writers' Union, Yaroslav Vasilievich had a reputation as an unpredictable, often inebriated figure with rough camp manners, which he made no effort to conceal, even at a Kremlin reception for the State Prize. (Note: At the Kremlin reception, Y. Smelyakov appeared inebriated. Instead of the usual thankful speech for such cases, he said to N. V. Podgorny, the Chairman of the Presidium of the Supreme Soviet of the USSR, who presented the award: "I have so many prizes, they seem shit!") Smelyakov maintained an aloof demeanor with everyone and categorically refused to acknowledge young poetic talents, yet the Solnechnogorsk poet managed to capture the attention of the author of the poem If I Fall Ill... G. A. Yelin recalled: "Only Yegor Samchenko (a psychiatrist from Solnechnogorsk), wildly gifted and now completely forgotten, succeeded—literally grabbing the old man by the collar: 'Come on, Yaroslav, I'll read you my genius poems!' Stunned by the audacity and the familiar 'you,' Smelyakov suddenly softened, and the entire Central House of Writers witnessed Samchenko reading his manuscript to the master in the downstairs buffet..." Later that same year, 1972, Yaroslav Smelyakov died, and Boris Slutsky, returning to the literary seminar two weeks later from the funeral of another veteran poet, Semyon Kirsanov, reproached his students, particularly Yegor Samchenko, who had written a poem about Smelyakov, and Viktor Gofman, for not deeming it necessary to attend their deceased colleagues' funerals.

In the early 1970s, Yegor Samchenko firmly established himself in Moscow's literary scene, becoming a regular at the apartment gatherings hosted by Vadim Kozhinov. The atmosphere of this salon is captured in a playful poem by Oleg Dmitriev, Literary Salon at Kozhinov's, from 1973, which mentions, alongside Kozhinov himself, Stanislav Kunyaev, Igor Shklyarevsky, Andrei Bitov, Vyacheslav Shugaev, Anatoly Peredreev, Vladimir Sokolov, and many other poets and writers.

Critic Sergey Kunyaev, providing brief characterizations of the poets mentioned in Oleg Dmitriev's impromptu poem, dismissively touched on the Solnechnogorsk author: "Yegor Samchenko, introduced to the circle by Shklyarevsky (whom Yegor always looked up to), will remain an enthusiastic spectator, never writing a single truly complete poem and drowning his creative inadequacy in horse-like doses of alcohol".

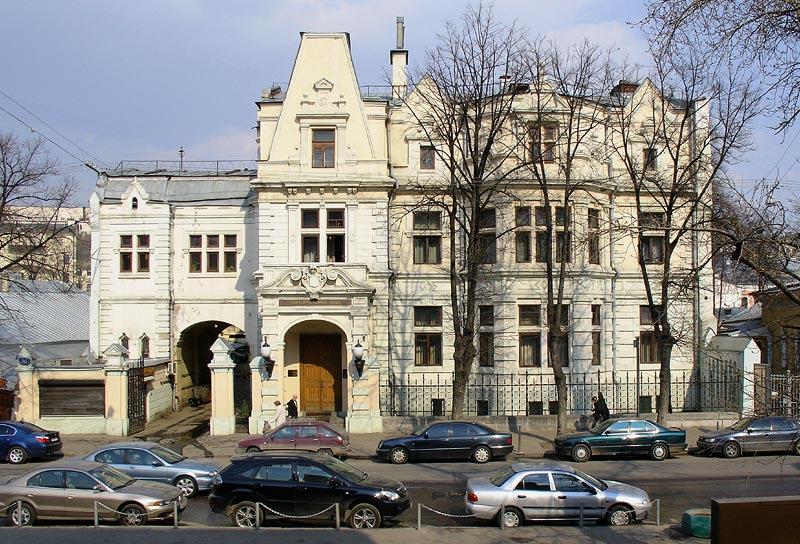
Central House of Writers in Moscow. Addictive passions made Samchenko a regular at the CDL restaurant. With bitter self-irony, he claimed the only positive thing about him was his Wassermann test.

Russian-Armenian poetess Seda Vermisheva recalled that to become a part of Moscow's literary life, she sought help from poetess and translator Tatyana Spendiarova, daughter of composer Alexander Spendiarov. Spendiarova introduced her to a circle of Moscow poets distinguished by their reverent attitude toward the work of Osip Mandelstam: Adelina Adalis, Lyudmila Migdalova, nonconformist artist Borukh Shteinberg —son of poet Arkady Shteinberg— and another representative of Moscow's underground, poet Leonid Gubanov. According to Seda Vermisheva, the center of this group was Yegor Samchenko.

Poet and writer Yuri Polyakov, editor-in-chief of Literary Gazette, wrote in his 2017 memoir Fragments of a Poet: "Mental illnesses and eccentricities were also encountered in our midst. One need only recall the poet Yegor Samchenko, formerly the chief psychiatrist of an entire Moscow region district. Well, in conversation, he himself reminded me of a patient who had escaped from an asylum". Mikhail Sinelnikov, discussing the literary preferences of poet Alexander Mezhirov, mentions his fondness "for the half-mad Yegor Samchenko, who made a sudden leap". Indeed, in Alexander Mezhirov's article On the Poetry of Yevgeny Yevtushenko in the almanac Poetry No. 56 in 1990, Yegor Samchenko is named among the most influential contemporary poets, alongside A. Voznesensky, B. Akhmadulina, J. Brodsky, and Yu. Kazakov. However, elsewhere, Sinelnikov recounts Mezhirov's angry remark about Samchenko: "A duplicitous degenerate!"

Samchenko employed this technique in crafting the image of his lyrical hero in the poem A Short Afterword: "And I catch myself thinking: / From one temple, I'm Rasputin, / From the other, I'm the Cheka itself. / My assassin and I, we're in harmony, / I've come to love us for the truth. / I'm Felix, once, I'm Felix, Felix! / I poisoned, I shot." Here, Felix refers to both Felix Yusupov, one of the organizers of Grigory Rasputin's murder, and Felix Dzerzhinsky, the founder and head of the Cheka.

=== Mikhail Sinelnikov on Yegor Samchenko ===
Poet, translator, and literary scholar Mikhail Sinelnikov synthesized the contradictory facets of the poet and psychiatrist's character. After Samchenko's death, Sinelnikov dedicated him a full article, Russian Wall Newspaper, in the November 2002 issue of the Russian-Jewish magazine Lehaim. According to his assessment, Samchenko was difficult to tolerate; his drunken antics, strange conversations, and megalomania irritated many, exuding a kind of "high-voltage tension" that periodically shocked with the "spark of a meticulously cultivated mental illness". Consequently, few desired to engage with Samchenko in everyday life for extended periods. "And an unsympathetic type, too," the memoirist concludes, as Samchenko's appearance was far from impeccable: either unwashed or disheveled, his mere presence caused strangers to steer clear.

Sinelnikov believes Samchenko's work has been unjustly forgotten in the 21st century. He cites the opinion of Samchenko's literary mentor, poet Boris Slutsky, who saw in him the future of Russian poetry. Sinelnikov considers this prediction justified: without Samchenko's poems about Ivan the Terrible, it is hard to imagine a complete picture of 20th-century Russian poetry. If tasked with compiling an anthology of forgotten Soviet poets, Sinelnikov names Samchenko as the first whom he would include. Samchenko's mark was that he could write either powerful or weak poems, but never mediocre ones that fade quickly, whereas great poems often emerge from worse ones.

Mikhail Sinelnikov calls Samchenko's association with the antisemitic wing of Russian literature and the editorial board of Nash Sovremennik a dramatic chapter in his biography. Yet, the person who valued Yegor Samchenko most was B. A. Slutsky, who paved his way in poetry, mentored him paternally —beyond the duties of a literary guide— lent him money, and even bought him clothing and shoes. In gratitude for Slutsky purchasing a new winter coat, Samchenko dedicated a poem Coat to him in his debut collection Hard Carriage, though it was criticized by Stanislav Rassadin. Nevertheless, one day, after thanking Slutsky for his care, Samchenko declared to his mentor: "But I won't be friends with you anymore, Boris Abramovich, now I'm an antisemite". This outburst deeply wounded the war-veteran poet. However, according to M. I. Sinelnikov, the cause of Samchenko's antisemitism lay not in ideological convictions but in alcohol-induced demoralization. The author again quotes Alexander Mezhirov: "Yes, here the madness of Ivan the Terrible coincided with the madness of the Central House of Writers restaurant!"

Despite this incident, Samchenko did not become antisemite; he retained respect for his mentor and love for his poetry, and he revered the poetry of Osip Mandelstam and his Conversation About Dante. It is reflected in Samchenko's poem To the 'Conversation About Dante. For this reason, right-wing literati were hesitant to fully embrace him: "Samchenko wasn't entirely 'ours,' somewhat 'both ours and theirs'! [...] Even duplicitous and pliable, Samchenko was unfit for a veche gathering. He was too much a poet to become an 'active bayonet' or join, for example, the poetry section's bureau..." Sinelnikov attempts to compare Samchenko's unbearable character and the measure of his talent to the contentiousness and genius of M. Yu. Lermontov: "But, my God, could anyone tolerate Lermontov! [...] The comparison seems impossible, and yet, and yet..."

== Bibliography ==
- Samchenko, G. D. (1975a). Жёсткий вагон: Стихи [Hard Carriage: Poems]. Первая книга в столице (in Russian). М.: Современник. p. 79.
- Samchenko, G. D. (1987). Помогаю жить: Стихи [Help for Living: Poems]. Первая книга в столице (in Russian). М.: Советский писатель. p. 176.
- Samchenko, G. D. (1989). Лики свободы: Стихи [Faces of Freedom: Poems]. Новинки «Современника» (in Russian). М.: Современник. p. 125. ISBN 5-270-00552-2.
- Samchenko, G. D. (1975b). В октябре и т. д.: Стихи [In October, and so on: Poems] (in Russian). М.: Рекламная библиотечка поэзии. p. 7.
