= Boris Slutsky =

Soviet poet

- Бори́с Слу́цкий
- Born: 7 May 1919; Sloviansk, Ukrainian SSR, Soviet Union
- Died: February 23, 1986 (aged 66); Tula, RSFSR, Soviet Union
- Education: Moscow Law Institute (Did not graduate); Maxim Gorky Literature Institute
- Occupations: Poet; Translator
- Relatives: Meir Amit (cousin)
- Writing career
- Language: Russian
- Period: 20th century
- Notable works: Memory; The Poets of Israel

Boris Abramovich Slutsky (Russian: Бори́с Абра́мович Слу́цкий; 7 May 1919 – 23 February 1986) was a Soviet poet, translator, Great Patriotic War veteran, major, and member of the Soviet Union of Writers (1957).

== Biography ==
Slutsky was born in Sloviansk, Ukrainian SSR in 1919 to a Jewish family. His father, Abram Naumovich Slutsky, was a junior official and his mother, Aleskandra Abramovna, was a music teacher. His father's family originated from Starodub, in the Principality of Chernigov. Slutsky had a younger brother, Efim (Haim, 1922-1995), and a sister, Maria. His cousin Meir Amit was an Israeli Military Intelligence director from 1962 to 1963 and a Mossad director from 1963 to 1968.

Slutsky grew up in Kharkov. He first attended a lito (literary studio) at the Kharkov Pioneers Palace but left due to pressure from his father, who dismissed Russian poetry as a viable career. In 1937, he entered the Law Institute of Moscow, and also studied at the Maxim Gorky Literature Institute from 1939 to 1941. In the autumn of 1939, he joined a group of young poets, including M. Kulchitzki, Pavel Kogan, S. Narovchatov, and David Samoilov, at the seminary of Ilya Selvinsky at the State Literary Publishing House, Goslitizdat. They called themselves "the Generation of 1940". Slutsky, however, was not exposed to the Shoah poems Selvinsky and his peers were known for until the Khrushchev's Thaw of the late 1950s. Slutsky became the only Russian poet to make the Holocaust a central focus of his writing.

Between 1941–1945 he served in the Red Army as a politruk of an infantry platoon. His war experiences are reflected in his poetry. After the war, he had the rank of major. In 1946, he lived on a small disability pension and began working as an editor and translator for a radio station.

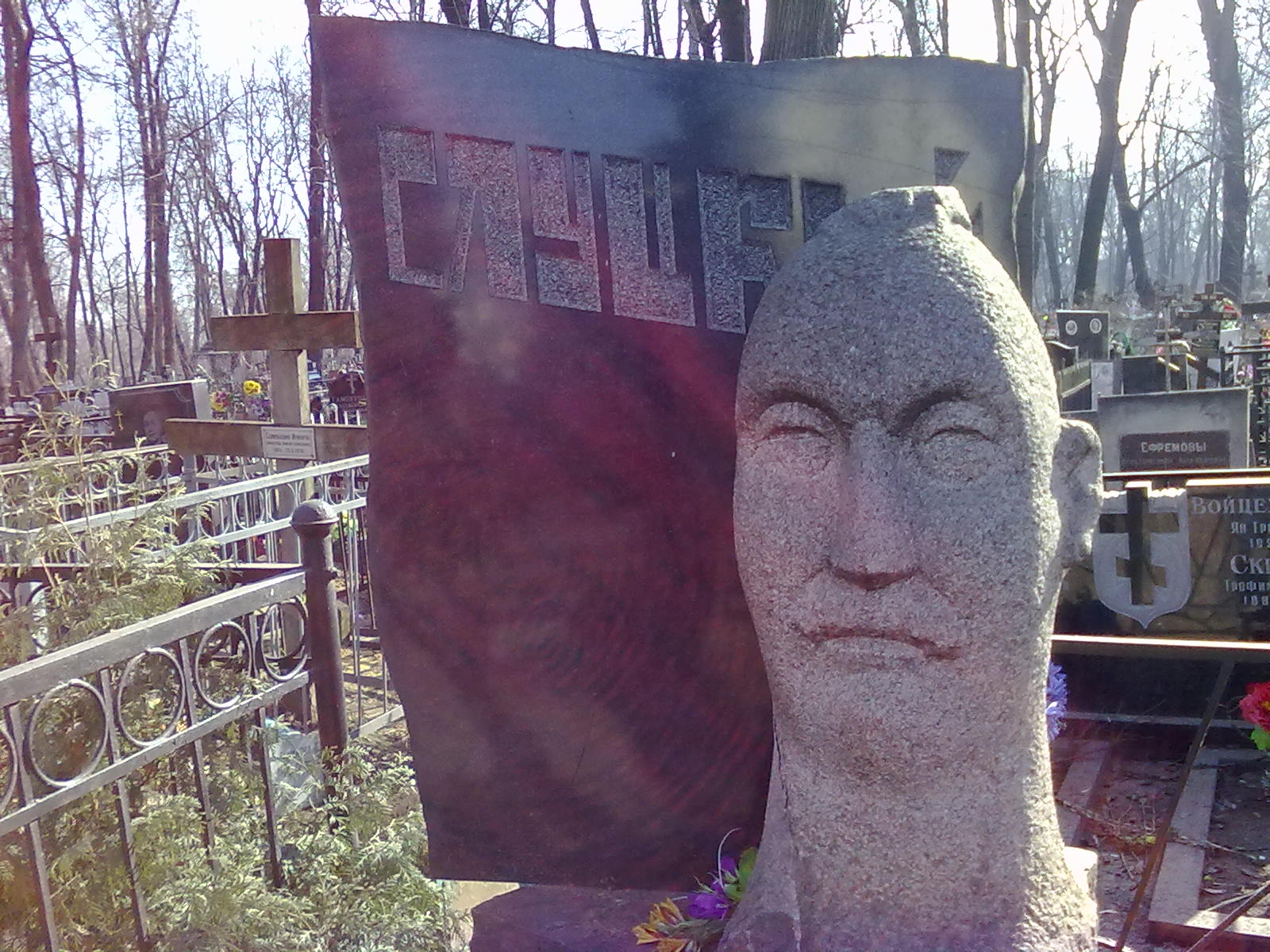
Boris Slutsky's grave in Piatnitsky Cemetery, Moscow.

Slutsky died on 23 February 1986 in Tula, Russia.

== Works ==
Together with David Samoylov, Slutsky is representative of the War generation of Russian poets and, due to the nature of his verse, is a crucial figure in the post-Stalin literary revival. His poetry is deliberately coarse, jagged, prosaic and conversational. It has a dry, polemic quality that perhaps reflects the poet's early training as a lawyer. He represented an opposing tendency to that of neo-romantic or neo-futuristic poets such as Andrey Voznesensky. In his works he approached Jewish themes, including material from the Jewish tradition about antisemitism (including in Soviet society) and the Holocaust.

As early as 1953–1954, prior to the 20th Congress of CPSU, verses condemning the Stalinist regime were attributed to Slutsky. These were circulated in "Samizdat" in the 1950s and were published in an anthology in the West (in Munich) in 1961. Slutsky neither confirmed nor denied their authorship.

In 1956, Ilya Ehrenburg created a sensation by quoting a number of previously unpublished poems by Slutsky in an article. In 1957, Slutsky's first book of poetry, Memory, was published, containing many poems written much earlier.

Slutsky edited The Poets of Israel, a landmark publication considered the first anthology of Israeli poetry, which was published in 1963.

He also translated the Yiddish poetry of Leib Kvitko, Aron Vergelis, Shmuel Galkin, Asher Shvartsman, and Jacob Sternberg to Russian.

== See also ==
- Samizdat
- Georgy Samchenko
