= Outer Ring Road, Chennai =

Urban road transit in Chennai, India

- Outer Ring Road, Chennai in red
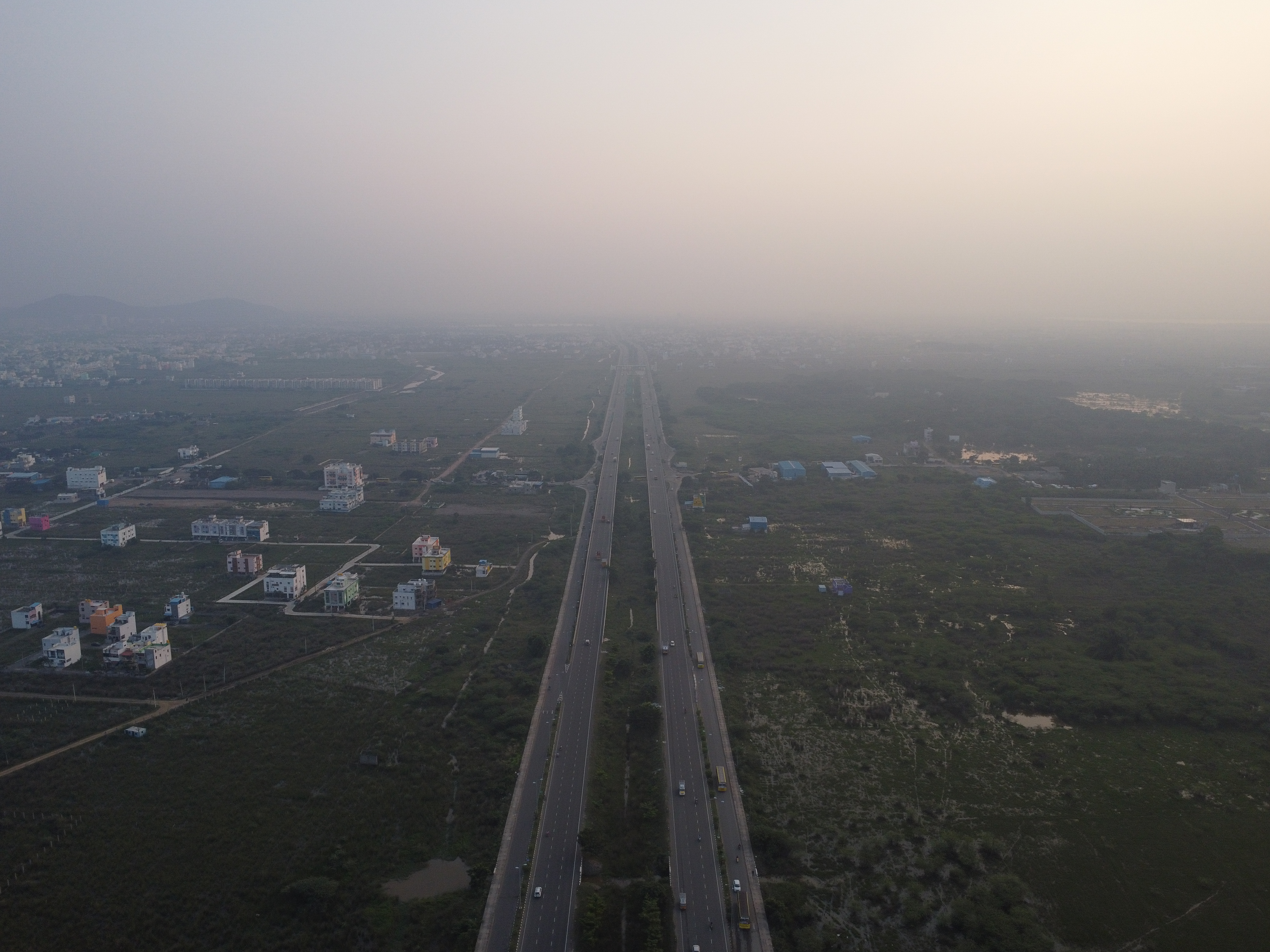
- Aerial view of Outer Ring Road near Mudichur

Route information
- Maintained by Tamil Nadu Road Development Company (TNRDC)

Location
- Country: India

Highway system
- Roads in India; Expressways; National; State; Asian

The Outer Ring Road, officially State Highway 234 (SH 234), is a major transport corridor along the periphery of Chennai Metropolitan Area (CMA) by the Chennai Metropolitan Development Authority (CMDA). It is 62 km long road connecting GST Road at Perungalathur, GST Road at Vandalur, NH 48 (GWT Road) at Nazarethpettai, CTH Road at Nemilichery to NH 16 (GNT Road) at Vijayanaallur and to TPP road at Minjur. On 29 August 2010, the then Tamil Nadu Deputy Chief Minister M. K. Stalin laid the foundation for the first phase of the project from Vandalur to Nemilichery covering a distance of 30 kilometres (19 mi). The Chennai ORR generally covers Avadi, Redhills, Minjur and Tambaram neighbourhoods.

== Phases ==
The project was developed in 2 phases with 2 segments each.

=== Phase 1 ===
The Phase 1 of the project covers a distance of 29.65 km. 10 Grade separators at major junctions have been planned along this route. It also includes 50 bus bays on both sides and also truck lay-byes for parking of around 100 trucks. Phase I of this project was implemented by GMR, and the project was originally expected to be completed by June 2012. Phase I was thrown open to the public on 29 August 2014 the then Chief Minister of Tamil Nadu J. Jayalalithaa through Video conferencing.

==== Segment I ====
The Segment I extends from GST Road (Vandalur) to NH48 (Nazarethpettai) covering a distance of 19.7 km. The development covers an area of about 265.38 Hectares.

==== Segment II ====
The Segment II extends from NH48 (Nazarethpettai) to CTH Road (Nemilichery) covering a distance of 9.5 km. The development covers an area of about 140.9 Hectares.

=== Phase II ===
The Phase 2 covers a distance of 33.1 km. Chennai Outer Ring Road Phase-II was inaugurated in 9 February 2021.

==== Segment III ====
The Segment III extends from CTH Road (Nemilichery) to GNT Road (Redhills) covering a distance of 18.8 km. The development covers an area of about 258.02 Hectares.

== Planned Developments (PPP mode) ==
Price Waterhouse Coopers (PWC) has done a micro market study on the development of 50 m along the road. It has suggested that the components of the development could include a 5-star hotel, retail segments – including an "auto main street" where the ORR connects industrial suburbs that house automobile giants such as Hyundai, Ford and Renault Nissan – and facilities like multiplex, residential, hospital, commercial, warehouse and green spaces. Developers would be identified through open competitive bidding for these projects.

=== High-Growth Zone ===
The region close to NH-45 is seen as a high-growth area covering the Chennai neighbourhoods places Vandalur, Mannivakkam, Mudichur, Redhills, Thiruninravur, Pattabiram, Muthapudupet, Morai, Malayambakkam-Mangadu, Minjur and Ponneri (Smart City). This would be the location for a 5-star hotel.

=== Auto Main Street ===
Localities near Minjur and Ponneri, which are hubs of automobile and component industries, would be the ideal locale for the auto main street, which is a niche retail for the automobile industry for which about 50 acres (200,000 m^{2}) have been earmarked.

=== Residential Areas ===
Residential areas have been planned for more than 150 acres near Minjur, Ponneri while residential spaces have been planned at Malayambakkam, Nazarethpettai, Agaramel and Poonamallee.

=== Warehouse ===
A major warehouse has been planned in Minjur.

=== IT Park ===
Pattabiram in Avadi would have TIDEL IT Park.

=== Knowledge city ===
Tamil Nadu Knowledge City is planned to be set up from Palavedu stretch of Outer Ring road, covering Tamaraipakkam and Vengal town regions in Tiruvallur district.

== Project Status ==
June 2015:

- GMR — NAPC has been awarded the contract for development of Phase I of ORR. First phase is to cost about 1,100 crores.
- Project will be completed by November 2020

February 2021:

- Road has been opened completely for public use on 8th Feb 2021.

== Transit connectivity ==
Outer Ring Road has connectivity with Poonamallee Bypass metro station of Yellow Line (Chennai Metro) on Poonamallee High Road. Another metro station along ORR is planned near Pattabiram Rountana.
