= Kalaipuli G. Sekaran =

Indian film distributor (1951/1952–2025)

- Born: 1951 or 1952
- Died: 13 April 2025 (aged 73); Chennai, Tamil Nadu, India
- Occupations: Actor, director, producer, distributor, writer, composer
- Years active: 1985–2025

Kalaipuli G. Sekaran (1951 or 1952 – 13 April 2025) was an Indian film distributor, producer, director and actor who has worked in Tamil-language films.

== Life and career ==
G. Sekaran began his career as a film financier and distributor, before becoming a producer and a partner at Kalaipuli Films with S. Thanu and Soori. They debuted as producers with the film Yaar? (1985) by Kannan, with Sekaran portraying a negative role in the film. He subsequently moved on and worked on as a director in films including Oorai Therunjukitten (1988), Kaaval Poonaigal (1989) and Ulavaali (1994), before launching himself as a lead actor in Jameen Kottai (1995). He subsequently also played the lead role in Kudumba Sangili (1999). After that Sekaran went back to distributing films.

In the late 2000s, he became the chairman of the Distributors' Council and represented the interest of distributors. In 2008, he directed a thriller called Kattuviriyan starring Malavika for which he also composed the music. In 2011, he worked on the production of a film titled Kallaparundhu, but the film did not have a theatrical release.

Sekaran died in Chennai on 13 April 2025, at the age of 73.

== Filmography ==
Year	Film	Director	Writer	Producer	Notes
1985	Yaar?	No	Yes	Yes	
1988	Pattikattu Thambi	No	Yes	No	
1988	Oorai Therinjikitten	Yes	Yes	No	
1989	Kaaval Poonaigal	Yes	Yes	No	
1994	Ulavaali	Yes	Yes	Yes	
1995	Jameen Kottai	No	Yes	No	
1999	Kudumba Sangili	No	Yes	Yes	
2008	Kattuviriyan	Yes	Yes	No	also music composer

As actor

Year	Film	Role	Notes
1985	Yaar?		
1988	Oorai Therinjikitten	Naayagam	
1989	Kaaval Poonaigal		
1994	Ulavaali		
1995	Jameen Kottai	Madasamy / Vikraman	
1999	Kudumba Sangili	Thangarasu	
2008	Kattuviriyan		
