= Kaaval Poonaigal =

- Poster
- Directed by: Kalaipuli G. Sekaran
- Written by: Kalaipuli G. Sekaran
- Produced by: G. Chamandeeswari
- Starring: Radikaa; Nizhalgal Ravi; Bhanu Chander; Manjula
- Cinematography: Ravindran
- Edited by: V. T. Vijayan
- Music by: Sangeetha Rajan
- Production company: Renuka Distributors
- Distributed by: Renuka Distributors
- Release date: 19 May 1989
- Country: India
- Language: Tamil

Kaaval Poonaigal (transl. Police cats) is a 1989 Indian Tamil-language political thriller film written and directed by Kalaipuli G. Sekaran. The film stars Radikaa, Nizhalgal Ravi, Bhanu Chander and Manjula. It was released on 19 May 1989.

== Cast ==
- Radikaa
- Nizhalgal Ravi
- Bhanu Chander
- Manjula
- Pandari Bai
- Senthil
- Somayajulu
- Balan K. Nair
- Prathapachandran
- Janardhan
- Baby Sujitha
- King Kong

== Production ==
The film was initially titled Karuppu Poonaigal (transl. Black cats). Because of its storyline revolving around an assassination attempt on the hospitalised Chief Minister M. G. Ramachandran, though the story was fictional, the film became controversial and there were calls for its banning. The hospital scenes were shot at an actual hospital in Porur.

== Soundtrack ==
The music was composed by Sangeetha Rajan. The film was promoted as being the first in Tamil cinema to use 4 track stereophonic sound.

Track listing
No.	Title	Singer(s)	Length
1.	"Chinna Sirusukalae"	S. P. Balasubrahmanyam	5:12
2.	"Nenjam Kalangiduthey"	S. P. Balasubrahmanyam	5:33
3.	"Ragame Padume"	K. S. Chithra	6:04
4.	"Rasanaiyya Rasanaiyya"	K. S. Chithra	5:30
Total length:			22:19

== Release and reception ==
Kaaval Poonaigal was released on 19 May 1989. P. S. S. of Kalki appreciated the performances of Radikaa, Manjula and Ravi, but felt the fight scenes were too long and dragging.
