= Varadharajapuram =

Varadhrajapuram
- neighbourhood
- Location in Metropolitan Chennai Varadhrajapuram (Tamil Nadu) Varadhrajapuram (India)
- Coordinates: 12.9095°N 80.0703°E
- Country: India
- State: Tamil Nadu
- Metro: Chennai

Languages
  - Official: Tamil
- Time zone: UTC+5:30 (IST)
- PIN: 600048

Varadharajapuram is a panchayat and a small southern suburb of Chennai, in the Indian state of Tamil Nadu. Varadhrajapuram lies between Mudichur and Mannivakkam, 6.5 km from Tambaram. It is located along Sriperumpudur State Highway in Kancheepuram district.

Varadharajapuram panchayat village belongs to Kundrathur Taluk. It is one of the residential neighbourhoods developed in 1970s with over 70 layouts, including Royappa Nagar Layout, which houses secretariat employees. The residents suffered during the 2015 floods. The residents also experience scarcity of drinking water.

== Nearby cities ==
- Mudichur 2 km
- Perungalathur 3.5 km
- Tambaram 6.5 km
- Vandalur4.5 km
- Chrompet 11.5 km
- Guindy 19 km
