= King Kong (actor) =

Indian actor

- Born: Shankar Ezhumalai; 18 August 1971 (age 55); Varadharajapuram, Tamil Nadu, India
- Occupation: Actor
- Years active: 1985–present
- Height: 0.95 m (3 ft 1 in)
- Spouse: Kala
- Children: 3
- Parent(s): Ezhumalai, Kasiammal

Shankar Ezhumalai, popularly credited by his moniker King Kong, is an Indian actor and comedian who has appeared in Tamil language films in supporting roles. A clip from the film Adhisaya Piravi (1990), which features King Kong dancing, has become a viral internet video titled Little Superstar.

== Career ==
King Kong has appeared in Tamil films, primarily portraying comedy supporting roles. He has also appeared in television serials and given stage performances as a dancer. A clip from the film Adhisaya Piravi (1990), featuring King Kong dancing in front of Rajinikanth, became a popular internet viral video in the late 2000s. The clip, dubbed "Little Superstar", features the actor breakdancing to MC Miker G & DJ Sven's "Holiday Rap". The video has been featured on YouTube, in Tom Anderson's bulletins on Myspace, on the E! TV show The Soup, the MSNBC shows Countdown with Keith Olbermann and Tucker, G4TV's Attack of the Show! and elsewhere, as well as having been parodied on Saturday Night Live.

In 2007, the actor was spotted seeking disability benefits and was reported to be in poverty. He returned to appear in films, notably appearing in a dance sequence in Pokkiri and then as a regular in Vadivelu's comedy tracks in Karuppusamy Kuththagaithaarar (2007) and Kanthaswamy (2009). The actor began working on a low-budget bilingual Tamil and Malayalam film titled Onnara Kullan in the lead role opposite softcore actress Shakeela, but the film remains unreleased. In recent years, actor King Kong has choreographed a dance number in a Doritos Tandoori Sizzler! commercial shown in Canada, which was filmed in India. He also made an appearance in British comedian Romesh Ranganathan's BBC Three show Asian Provocateur during October 2015 and appeared in an in-episode short film.

== Selected filmography ==
=== Tamil films ===
Year	Film	Role	Notes
1988	Oorai Therinjikitten		
1989	Anbu Kattalai		
1989	Nethiyadi		
1990	Athisaya Piravi	Dancer	
1991	Kizhakku Karai	Foreign Palli	
1992	Chinna Pasanga Naanga		
1992	Samundi		
1993	Minmini Poochigal		
1993	Chinna Jameen		
1994	Chinna Pulla		
1994	Uzhiyan		
1995	Jameen Kottai	Pandi	
1996	Katta Panchayathu		
1996	Panchalankurichi		
1996	Take It Easy Urvashi		
1997	Sakthi		
1998	Naam Iruvar Namakku Iruvar		
1998	Dhinamdhorum		
1999	Sivan	Nattu	
1999	Pudhu Kudithanam	Aruva Velu	
2000	Thirunelveli		Uncredited role
2000	Nagalingam		
2000	Kannaal Pesavaa		
2000	Nee Enthan Vaanam		
2003	Kadhal Kirukkan	Servant	
2005	Kicha Vayasu 16		
2006	Kaivantha Kalai	Office assistant	
2006	Vathiyar		
2007	Pokkiri	Lorry Driver	
2007	Karuppusamy Kuththagaithaarar		
2007	Piragu	Samarasam's assistant	
2008	Indiralohathil Na Azhagappan		
2008	Kasimedu Govindan	Govindan's friend	
2008	Muniyandi Vilangial Moonramandu		
2009	Kanthaswamy	Thief	
2009	Sirithal Rasipen	Kaththi Kuththu Pandian	
2010	Kacheri Arambam		
2010	Sura	Fake policeman	
2012	Murattu Kaalai	Kaalaiyan's uncle	
2014	Tenaliraman		
2014	Vilaasam		
2015	Maharani Kottai	Saamy	
2015	Athiradi		
2016	Sutta Pazham Sudatha Pazham	Kidnapper	
2016	Summave Aaduvom		
2016	Bayam Oru Payanam		
2018	Nari Vettai		
2023	Kasethan Kadavulada		
2023	Kick	Shooting spot crew member	
2024	Rajakili	Orphanage inmate	

=== Other language films ===
Year	Film	Role	Language	Ref.
1988	Yamudiki Mogudu		Telugu	
1990	Raja Vikramarka		Telugu	
1992	Gharana Mogudu		Telugu	
1994	Gandugali		Kannada	
1997	Ghoonghat		Hindi	
1999	Biwi No.1		Hindi	
2000	Tera Jadoo Chal Gayaa		Hindi	
2002	Malli Malli Choodali	Pavan's friend	Telugu	
2002	H2O	Vairamuthu's friend	Kannada	
2013	Chennai Express	Passerby	Hindi	

=== Television ===
- My Dear Bootham
