= Kudumba Sangili =

- Directed by: Ramchander
- Produced by: Kalaipuli G. Sekaran
- Starring: Kalaipuli G. Sekaran; Khushbu
- Cinematography: Ravindhar
- Edited by: Lakshmi Shankar
- Music by: Sirpy
- Production company: Sridurga Cine Arts
- Release date: 26 November 1999
- Country: India
- Language: Tamil

Kudumba Sangili (transl. Family Chain) is a 1999 Indian Tamil language drama film directed by P. N. Ramachandar. The film stars the producer Kalaipuli G. Sekaran alongside Khushbu, while Manivannan plays a supporting role. The film, which had music composed by Sirpy, opened in November 1999.

== Cast ==
- Kalaipuli G. Sekaran as Thangarasu
- Khushbu as Rasathi
- Alex
- Rajesh as Chidambaram
- Nithya Ravindran
- Vadivukkarasi as Valiyamma
- Bayilvan Ranganathan
- Senthil
- Thideer Kannaiah

== Soundtrack ==
The music was composed by Sirpy.

Song	Singers	Lyrics
Kotti Vecha	Anandhu, Devie Neithiyar, Deepika	Kalidasan
Maatikiruchu Inga	Sirpy	Kalidasan
Nellin Manippol	Mano, Sujatha	Kalidasan
Petha Manasu	Sujatha, Unni Menon	Kalidasan
Thaaikku Theriyatha	K. S. Chithra	Kalidasan

== Release ==
Post-release, the film was exempted from paying entertainment tax for four weeks.
