= MC Miker G & DJ Sven =

Dutch hip hop duo

M.C. Miker G & DJ Sven
- Origin: Amsterdam, Netherlands
- Genre: Dutch hip hop
- Years active: 1986–1992
- Labels: Sony Records; Anticon
- Members: Lucien Witteveen; Sven van Veen

MC Miker G & DJ Sven were a hip hop duo from the Netherlands. The duo consisted of Lucien Witteveen (MC Miker G) and Sven van Veen (DJ Sven). The 1980s saw the two launch "Holiday Rap" to international success. The song contains elements of Madonna's hit "Holiday" and an interpolation of the chorus of Cliff Richard's "Summer Holiday", produced and mixed by Ben Liebrand.

== Biography ==
=== Early years ===
Witteveen and van Veen became acquainted in 1986 in a disco in Hilversum. The disco, Club Baccara, and the resident DJ Martin van der Schagt had a home studio where he recorded the demo version of the Holiday Rap using the original tape loops of Madonna's Holiday. This version was not usable for commercial release. Witteveen was discovered by Hotsound Records' Erik van Vliet, but Frits van Swoll, A & R manager of Dureco, took the song away from Erik, as Frits heard the demo on a local radio station, and approached Ben Liebrand to produce it from scratch. Their single "Holiday Rap" became an international success, occupying number one on the single charts in at least 6 countries and reaching the top 10 in at least 8 other countries. It was named by MuchMusic as the worst video of 1987. It is considered a one-hit wonder.

=== Rise to fame and later years ===
In Germany, the song stayed at the top of the charts for five weeks in August and September. The follow-up single "Celebration Rap" (based on the Kool & the Gang hit "Celebration" and including "We Are Family" by Sister Sledge) did not repeat this success, but still made it into the top 10 in several countries. The two began a large-scale European tour in 1987. After disbanding, DJ Sven continued to work on music-related productions while MC Miker G suffered from drug addiction and was homeless for several years.

In 1988, Hotsound's Erik van Vliet took them back and they released the song "And the Bite Goes On"; however this proved to be the duo's final release.

In February 2006, DJ Sven appeared on Channel Five's Now That's Embarrassing: The 80s. His record was nominated just behind "Men in Makeup" and the Sinclair C5. He is currently working as a DJ in the Netherlands, and co-hosts the daily Somertijd show presented by Rob van Someren, from 2003 until 2014 on Radio Veronica, and since 2015 on Radio 10. In 2009, MC Miker G performed mature and personal rap songs under the name Lions Den.

=== Little Superstar viral video ===
On July 30, 2006, a short clip from a South Indian film from the 1990s was uploaded onto YouTube with the title Little Superstar. By October, the video had gone viral and accumulated 18,763,819 views (as of December 2015). The clip featured South Indian comic actor King Kong dancing to "Holiday Rap".

== Discography ==
=== Singles ===
List of singles as lead artist, with selected chart positions, showing year released
Title	Year	Peak chart positions										
Title	Year	NLD		AUT	BEL	FRA	GER	ITALY			SWI	UK
Title	Year	40	100	AUT	BEL	FRA	GER	H P	M D	S C	SWI	UK
"Holiday Rap"	1986	1	1	2	1	1	1	1	1	2	1	6
"Celebration Rap"	1986	8	7	29	21	41	30	8	7	10	28	97
"Play It Loud"	1986	–	–	–	–	–	–	–	–	–	–	–
"And the Bite Goes On"	1988	– (Note: "And the Bite Goes On" did not make the main Dutch Top 40, but landed at number 20 on its Tipparade extension.)	45	–	39	–	–	–	–	–	–	–
"Never Woke Up in Tears"	1988	–	–	–	–	–	–	–	–	–	–	–
"This Dance Is Yours"	1989	–	–	–	–	–	–	–	–	–	–	–
"House Full of Jazz"	1989	–	–	–	–	–	–	–	–	–	–	–
"Nights Over New York"	1989	15	15	–	–	–	–	–	–	–	–	–
"Dedication"	1989	–	–	–	–	–	–	–	–	–	–	–
"Holiday Rap" (remix)	1991	– (Note: The 1991 remix of "Holiday Rap" did not make the main Dutch Top 40, but landed at number 17 on its Tipparade extension.)	62	–	–	–	–	–	–	–	–	–
"That'll Do It"	1991	–	–	–	–	–	–	–	–	–	–	–
"Let's Ride"	1994	–	–	–	–	–	–	–	–	–	–	–
"Holiday Rap" (New Radio Mix)	1998	–	–	–	–	–	–	–	–	–	–	–
"Holiday Rap" (Long Summer Mix)	1998	–	–	–	–	–	–	–	–	–	–	–
"Holiday Rap" (Hot Summer Dub)	1998	–	–	–	–	–	–	–	–	–	–	–
"Holiday Rap" (Modern Bass Mix)	1998	–	–	–	–	–	–	–	–	–	–	–
"Holiday Rap 2002"	2002	–	–	–	–	–	–	–	–	–	–	–
"Beef"	2002	–	–	–	–	–	–	–	–	–	–	–

== See also ==
- Little Superstar
