= Yaar? (film) =

- Poster
- Directed by: Sakthi–Kannan
- Written by: G. Sekaran
- Produced by: S. Thanu; G. Sekaran; P. Soori
- Starring: Arjun; Nalini; Jaishankar; J. V. Somayajulu
- Cinematography: Rajaraajan
- Edited by: V. T. Vijayan
- Music by: V. S. Narasimhan
- Production company: Kalaippuli Films International
- Distributed by: Kalaippuli Films International; V Creations
- Release date: 20 September 1985
- Running time: 138 minutes
- Country: India
- Language: Tamil

Yaar? (transl. Who?) is a 1985 Indian Tamil-language supernatural horror film, directed by Sakthi–Kannan and produced by S. Thanu, P. Suri and G. Sekaran. The latter scripted the film and portrayed a negative role. The film stars Arjun, Nalini, Jaishankar and J. V. Somayajulu while Rajinikanth acted in a cameo appearance. It was released on 20 September 1985.

== Plot ==
Rajaram and his wife Lakshmi is a rich couple but without a children. Their friend Manikkam persuades them to adopt a baby whose mother just died at childbirth. The kid is said to be evil haunted. It also kills an assistant who tries to save Rajaram as per the instructions of Kolli malai Swamy.

They name the child Raja. As Raja grows up he becomes more evil. Raja is in love with Manikkam's daughter Devi, but she is in love with military officer Jagan. Devastated by this, Raja tries to lure Devi and seduce her. But knowing this Jagan becomes furious at Devi and hates her. Devi to prove herself visits temple and does spiritual remedies. Jagan's friend VV Janardhan insists Jagan that Raja is an evil spirit and he needs to be killed as soon as he turns a monster.

Jagan, Janarthanan and Rajaram visits Kolli hills swamy but and knows the idea of killing Raja. But Rajaram and Janarthanan were killed during the journey. When Raja tries to seduce a girl, Jagan interferes in his way and assaults him. When Jagan is defeated by devilish Raja, Devi who is in the form of goddess stabs Raja and kills him.

== Cast ==
- Arjun as Jagan
- Shyam as Raja
- Nalini as Devi
- Jaishankar as Rajaram
- Nizhalgal Ravi as VV "Vaithu Vali" Janardhan
- Jayachitra as Lakshmi
- Senthil as College Professor
- G. Srinivasan as Sivanesan, Rajaram's uncle
- Delhi Ganesh as Manickam
- G. Sekaran as Rangan
- 'Herran' Ramasamy as evil sorcerer
- Thideer Kannaiah as Peon
- J. V. Somayajulu as Temple priest
- A. K. Veerasamy
- Kovai Mani
- Nellai Sarathi
- T. K. S. Natarajan
- Rajinikanth as himself (cameo appearance)
- Disco Shanti as Raja's love interest (extended cameo appearance)

== Production ==
Film distributors S. Thanu, G. Sekaran and Soori joined together and made their debut as producers with Yaar under their newly formed production company Kalaipuli International. Sekaran scripted the film and portrayed a negative role. The film began production in early 1985. Rajinikanth portrayed a cameo appearance in the film after being requested by Thanu. The scene where Rajinikanth prays in a puja room was shot at his own house.

== Soundtrack ==
The soundtrack was composed by V. S. Narasimhan.

Track listing
| No. | Title | Lyrics | Singer(s) | Length |
|---|---|---|---|---|
| 1. | "Edhukkuthan" | Kannan | S. P. Balasubrahmanyam, Ramola | 4:16 |
| 2. | "Abiramiye" | Vaali | S. P. Balasubrahmanyam | 5:05 |
| 3. | "Aana Mela Ambariyaam" | Kannan | Malaysia Vasudevan, B. S. Sasirekha | 4:53 |
| 4. | "Varuvaalo Devi" | S. Thanu | P. Jayachandran, D. Kousalya | 4:18 |
| Total length: | | | | 18:32 |

== Reception ==
Due to Arjun and Nalini not yet being popular at the time, to promote the film, Thanu created hype with "scary" posters and created a devout feel "by making junior artistes dance in the cinema theatre during the climax amman song". Kalki called the film's first half better than the second, criticising the change from horror to godliness, appreciated Ravi's performance, and the stunt sequences featuring Arjun. The film's success provided breakthrough for Arjun as an actor in Tamil film industry and Kannan adapting the film's name as a prefix.
