= Holiday Rap =

1986 single by MC Miker G & DJ Sven

Single by MC Miker G & DJ Sven
- B-side: "Whimsical Touch"
- Released: 1986
- Length: 4:25
- Label: High Fashion Music; Dureco Benelux
- Songwriters: Brian Bennett; Curtis L. Hudson; Bruce Welch; Lisa Stevens; Lucien Witteveen; Sven van Veen
- Producer: Ben Liebrand

MC Miker G & DJ Sven singles chronology
"Holiday Rap" (1986)	"Celebration Rap" (1987)

Audio sample
- file; help

"Holiday Rap" is a song by Dutch musical duo MC Miker G & DJ Sven. The debut single of the duo, it was released in most European countries in 1986 and achieved success, topping the charts of the Netherlands, Belgium, France, Italy, Switzerland, and West Germany and reaching number one on the European Hot 100 Singles chart. In North America, the single did not chart in the United States but peaked at number nine in Canada.

== Music and lyrics ==
Musically, the song is based on Madonna's 1983 hit "Holiday". DJ Martin van der Schagt had a home studio where he recorded the demo version of "Holiday Rap" using the original tape loops of Madonna's "Holiday". Not possible for a commercial release, producer Ben Liebrand figured out which instruments were used in the original and re-recorded the music from scratch as opposed to sampling the original, with different lyrics and new melodies. In the lyrics, both singers tell of their summer vacations in various towns, such as London and New York. The song also features an interpolation of the chorus of Cliff Richard's "Summer Holiday". The music video for the song was named by MuchMusic as the worst video of 1986.

In 1987, Russian Sergey Minaev, a Soviet DJ and pop singer of the mid-1980s, who specialized in humorous songs and musical parodies, performed his version called "DJ's Rap (Рэп дискжокея)" with new lyrics about Soviet censorship in satirical key. It gained strong popularity throughout the USSR in 1987, when music video was released. It reached 4th place in "Videos of the Year" by "Smena" and 12th place in January 1988's "Top 30 Hits" by ZD Awards.

== Track listings ==
CD maxi
No.	Title	Length
1.	"Holiday Rap" (extended)	6:22
2.	"Holiday Rap" (a cappella)	6:10
3.	"Whimsical Touch"	5:01
4.	"Holiday Rap" (radio edit)	4:27

7-inch single
No.	Title	Length
1.	"Holiday Rap"	4:25
2.	"Whimsical Touch"	5:00

12-inch maxi
No.	Title	Length
1.	"Holiday Rap"	6:20
2.	"Holiday Rap" (a cappella)	6:09
3.	"Holiday Rap" (hip hop instrumental)	6:20
4.	"Whimsical Touch"	5:00

== Charts ==
=== Weekly charts ===
"Holiday Rap"

Chart (1986–1987)	Peak position
Australia (Australian Music Report)	11
Austria (Ö3 Austria Top 40)	2
Belgium (Ultratop 50 Flanders)	1
Canada Top Singles (RPM)	9
Denmark (IFPI)	3
Europe (Eurochart Hot 100)	1
Finland (Suomen virallinen lista)	3
France (SNEP)	1
Italy (Hit Parade)	1
Italy (Musica e dischi)	1
Netherlands (Dutch Top 40)	1
Netherlands (Single Top 100)	1
Norway (VG-lista)	3
Spain (AFE)	1
Sweden (Sverigetopplistan)	7
Switzerland (Schweizer Hitparade)	1
UK Singles (Official Charts)	6
West Germany (GfK)	1

"Holiday Rap '91"

Chart (1991)	Peak position
Netherlands (Single Top 100)	62

=== Year-end charts ===
Chart (1986)	Position
Austria (Ö3 Austria Top 40)	29
Belgium (Ultratop)	32
Europe (European Hot 100 Singles)	17
Netherlands (Dutch Top 40)	14
Netherlands (Single Top 100)	11
Switzerland (Schweizer Hitparade)	27
West Germany (Media Control)	5

Chart (1987)	Position
Australia (Australian Music Report)	88
Canada Top Singles (RPM)	69

== Certifications ==
Region	Certification	Certified units/sales
France (SNEP)	Silver	250,000^{*}
^{*} Sales figures based on certification alone.

== See also ==
- Little Superstar
- David S. Pumpkins
