= When We Were at War =

Song
- Language: Russian
- Genre: Poem
- Songwriter: David Samoylov

"When We Were at War" (Russian: Когда мы были на войне; author's title "Song of the Hussar") is a poem by David Samoylov, included in his collection of poems, "Voices Beyond the Hills", in 1981–1985. It was set to music by Viktor Stolyarov, who read it in the Ogoniok magazine. The song gained popularity under the guise of an old Cossack song.

It was later expanded to sound more "cossack-like" by Viktor Stolyarov.

== See also ==
- Bard (Soviet Union)
