= Athisaya Piravi =

1990 film by S. P. Muthuraman

- Poster
- Directed by: S. P. Muthuraman
- Screenplay by: Panchu Arunachalam
- Based on: Yamudiki Mogudu (Telugu)
- Produced by: A. Purnachandra Rao
- Starring: Rajinikanth; Kanaka; Sheeba
- Cinematography: T. S. Vinayagam
- Edited by: R. Vittal; S. P. Mohan
- Music by: Ilaiyaraaja
- Production company: Lakshmi Productions
- Release date: 15 June 1990
- Country: India
- Language: Tamil

Athisaya Piravi (transl. Extraordinary being) is a 1990 Indian Tamil-language fantasy comedy film directed by S. P. Muthuraman and written by Panchu Arunachalam. It is a remake of the Telugu film Yamudiki Mogudu (1988). The film stars Rajinikanth, Kanaka, and Sheeba, while Nagesh, Jai Ganesh, Chinni Jayanth, Cho Ramaswamy, and Vinu Chakravarthy, among others, play supporting roles. It was released on 15 June 1990, and underperformed at box office. According to Muthuraman, Athisaya Piravi underperformed at the box office, in contrast to the Telugu original, as the concept of life after death and re-incarnation did not go down well with the Tamil audience.

== Plot ==
Kaalaiyan lives a poor lifestyle with his widowed mother. He falls in love with a girl called Sumathi, but because of his poor background, Sumathi's wealthy father, Murukesh is not ready to accept him. Kaalaiyan also gets into hot water with Murukesh as he opposes his men planning to demolish some huts. Murukesh and his partner devise a plan to kill Kaalaiyan by tricking him into believing that he is going to marry him to Sumathi. The plan works, and they eventually succeed in killing him. Kaalaiyan's spirit goes to the underworld and meets the Lord of Death himself, Yama. Kaalaiyan explains to Yama the whole ordeal and that his death was a mistake, so Yama transports him back to an identical body of a mild-mannered villager, Balu, whose life is threatened by his paternal uncle and aunt, who are trying to kill him.

Reborn as Balu, he soon adapts to his new life, along with his new widowed mother and sweetheart, Gauri. He also sets out to teach his uncle, Chinnasamy, aunt, and cousin Periyasaamy a lesson for their ill-treatment of him and his (new) mother. Life goes on, and he has no memories of his old life until one day Murukesh, an old friend of Chinnasamy, comes to visit them. Seeing him, Balu remembers his previous life and immediately goes to his previous place, where he finds Murukesh's goons attacking the area. Upon seeing him alive, they all are astounded and flee from the place. He then explains to his biological mother and Sumathi the whole story of how he was killed and reincarnated. Meanwhile, Gauri comes searching for Balu to Chennai, and hilarity ensues as Balu/Kaalaiyan struggles to manage both lovers. Balu, with help of Chitragupta, plans his revenge on Murukesh and his partner by outdoing him in wealth and humiliate them, but when Balu's relatives also arrive to Chennai, the whole confusion is revealed, and Murukesh captures both the families of Kaalaiyan and Balu and tries to kill him, but Balu/Kaalaiyan thwarts his plans and ultimately succeeds in his revenge.

== Cast ==
- Rajinikanth as Kaalaiyan and Balu
- Kanaka as Gauri
- Sheeba as Sumathi
- Madhavi as Rambha (Guest appearance)
- V. K. Ramasamy as Chitragupta
- Nagesh as Murukesh
- Cho as Vichitra Gupta
- Senthamarai as Chinnasaamy
- Jai Ganesh as Murukesh's partner
- Vinu Chakravarthy as Yamadharmaraja
- Sudhakar as Murukesh's partner's son
- Chinni Jayanth as Periyasaamy
- Gopi
- Omakuchi Narasimhan as Jai Ganesh's servant
- King Kong as Kaalaiyan's friend
- Vijayalalitha
- S. N. Parvathy as Kaalaiyan's mother
- Kamala Kamesh as Balu's mother

Uncredited

- Manik Irani as father
- S. V. Ranga Rao as Balu's father (portrait)

== Soundtrack ==
The soundtrack has six songs composed by Ilaiyaraaja.

Songs	Singers	Lyrics
"Annakiliyae"	Malaysia Vasudevan	Vaali
"Idhalengum"	Malaysia Vasudevan, S. Janaki	Pulamaipithan
"Paattukku Paattu"	Malaysia Vasudevan, K. S. Chithra	Gangai Amaran
"Singari Pyari"	Malaysia Vasudevan, S. Janaki	Vaali
"Thanananthan"	Malaysia Vasudevan, S. Janaki	Piraisoodan
"Unna Partha"	K. S. Chithra, Malaysia Vasudevan	Vaali

== Reception ==
N. Krishnamswamy of The Indian Express wrote, "Directed by S. P. Muthuraman, who keeps the action from sagging, Panju Arunachalam redoes his Kalyanaraman idea and provides the dialogues, even as Cho keeps lighting crackers with dialogues loaded with political innuendo." P. S. S. of Kalki wrote that whenever doubt arises whether such things happen, Rajinikanth turns around and says he is there, is that not enough. Cinema Express appreciated the film for its comedy, saying Rajinikanth continued to show his prowess in that genre after Guru Sishyan (1988). According to Muthuraman, Athisaya Piravi underperformed at the box office, in contrast to the Telugu original, as the concept of life after death r andeincarnation did not go down well with Tamil audiences.

== Legacy ==
Many years after the release of the film, a viral video entitled "Little Superstar" became very popular on the internet. The clip features the scene with Rajinikanth watching dwarf Indian actor King Kong dancing to "Holiday Rap" by MC Miker G & DJ Sven. The video was featured on the MSNBC show Countdown with Keith Olbermann and Tucker Carlson in late 2006 where King Kong was mistaken to be a child actor. It was also cited by Bobby Moynihan as a source of inspiration for SNL's "Haunted Elevator" sketch, which aired in late 2016 and featured noted character David S. Pumpkins. The video was also parodied on Saturday Night Live.

== Bibliography ==
- Ramachandran, Naman (2014) [2012]. Rajinikanth: The Definitive Biography. New Delhi: Penguin Books. ISBN 978-0-14-342111-5.
