= Oorai Therinjikitten =

- Poster
- Directed by: Kalaipuli G. Sekaran
- Written by: Kalaipuli G. Sekaran
- Produced by: C. Muthuramalingam; K. Prabhakaran
- Starring: Pandiarajan; Pallavi
- Cinematography: K. B. Dhayalan
- Edited by: V. T. Vijayan
- Music by: Gangai Amaran
- Production company: Cineco Films
- Release date: 15 January 1988
- Running time: 149 minutes
- Country: India
- Language: Tamil

Oorai Therinjikitten (transl. I understood the town) is a 1988 Indian Tamil-language comedy film, written and directed by Kalaipuli G. Sekaran. The film stars Pandiarajan and Pallavi, with Jaishankar, Senthil and Sekaran in supporting roles. It was released on 15 January 1988.

== Plot ==
Govindan, a petty thief, forms an alliance with Pandian aka Rajan, and together they concoct a scheme. They round up a few mentally unstable homeless beggars, dress them in affluent attire, and lure them with biscuits. The beggars are then prepared for an auction, where Rajan masquerades as the heir of a wealthy Nawab, pretending to sell a priceless royal chair. However, Chinnasamy, the auctioneer, after giving the money discovers the ruse and begins to pursue Rajan and Govindan. Rajan narrowly escapes capture by blending into a political rally. The duo then infiltrates a marriage hall, feigning their identities as relatives. They befriend Manickam "Ice Mama", and gain access to the dining hall. Although Manickam's brother-in-law uncovers their true identities, Rajan and Govindan manage to collect the wedding gift money from the relatives and escape once again. At 10 pm sharp, Rajan rushes back to the railway station, arousing Govindan's suspicion. Govindan follows Rajan, only to discover that he is, in fact, a porter at the railway station. Govindan confronts Rajan alias, Pandian, about his concealed past.

Pandian opens up about his troubled past. His mother died due to illness when he was a young boy, leaving behind his toddler sister, Vidya and his father had already abandoned them. Pandian's relatives, too, deserted them, leaving the siblings orphaned in their village. Desperate to escape their dire circumstances, they boarded a lorry to Madras. Fearing exploitation, they sought refuge in a temple. From then on, Pandian led a double life: working as a porter by day and committing petty crimes as "Rajan" by night. At present, the police launch a search for Pandian and Govindan, while, Pandian's sister Vidya believes he is wealthy and requests him to buy a car. Pandian, deeply in debt to lawyer Varatharajan, devises a trap to escape him, catching him in a compromising position with a woman and coerces the lawyer to write a letter, promising never to misbehave with any woman again.

Just as Pandian is about to rent a Datsun car, a wealthy businessman, Thangadurai purchases the vehicle, whom Vidya had mentioned earlier. Determined to acquire the car, Pandian distracts Thangadurai's daughter Geetha, and buys the car. With his new vehicle, Pandian heads to meet Vidya at her college. Pandian introduces Govindan to his sister Vidya as Selvamani. They encounter the principal, who is Ice Mama's brother-in-law, and Pandian precariously evades without concealing his identity. Further, Pandian discovers Vidya in love with Dr. Ramkumar, the son of Yercaud Subramanian, a wealthy estate owner. En route back to Chennai, Pandian witnesses an accident caused by Thangadurai, who damages a sacred tree. Pandian and Govindan intervene to stop a fake priest from forcing Thangadurai's daughter, Geetha, to perform a humiliating ritual. Geetha is instantly drawn to Pandian, alias Rajan. Thangadurai discovers that Geetha has fallen for Rajan after she scribbles Rajan's name all over the car using oil-proof paint. Yercaud Subramanian finalizes Vidya's engagement, while Pandian negotiates the dowry. Thangadurai offers Pandian his daughter Geetha's hand in marriage. Although Pandian is hesitant, Govindan accepts the proposal on his behalf. Pandian, now reformed, vows to abandon his life of theft, shedding his alias "Rajan." However, after marriage, Vidya discovers that her in-laws are materialistic and demand a diamond ring as a dowry. Pandian is coerced into theft once again to settle the debt. At a marriage hall, Pandian attempts to steal gift money but is caught by the police, witnessed by Thangadurai and Geetha.

At the prison, Pandian befriends Muthu, who reveals that Nayagam, a man on death row, is scheduled to be executed soon. Muthu recounts Nayagam's past, detailing how he took the blame for a car accident caused by his employer's daughter, Shanti. Muthu and Shanti embezzled the money meant for Nayagam's family, leading to their poverty and loss. Nayagam later rescues Shanti, who feigns reformation. Through his own efforts, Nayagam becomes wealthy, only to discover his wife's relapse into drug addiction. In a fit of rage, Nayagam kills Shanti and is subsequently imprisoned. On the day of Nayagam's execution, Pandian emotionally reflects on his past. Pandian is shocked upon the arrival of Ramkumar, Vidya's husband as a new inmate and brutally assaults him.

It is now revealed that Yercaud Subramaniam is actually a pretender to wealth, who exploits boys by forcing them to marry rich girls, only to usurp the dowry. Subramaniam plots to attack Pandian in prison, but, Nayagam voluntarily takes Pandian's place in the prison kitchen and fights off the attackers. As Nayagam faces his impending execution, his last wish is to meet Pandian. Although Pandian is asleep, Nayagam leaves a cryptic clue – an address – that ultimately reveals his shocking connection to Pandian: he is his father. Pandian, now released from prison, inherits his father's properties. Subramaniam attempts to blackmail Pandian, demanding money in exchange for Ramkumar's release. However, Pandian, aware of Subramaniam's true intentions enlightens Vidya, explaining that Ramkumar was merely a pawn in Subramaniam's scheme. Lawyer Varadharajan, now a public prosecutor, driven by a personal vendetta on Pandian, vows to imprison Ramkumar at any cost. As planned by Subramaniam, Padma and Lavanya, appear in court, claiming to be Ramkumar's wives, but surprisingly, point towards Pandian's two friends, who had promised to marry cheated women. Pandian silences the lawyer by producing the letter of apology he had written earlier, which renders Varadharajan speechless. Ramkumar is subsequently released.

Pandian's friends reveal that they, along with Geetha and Thangadurai, have been protecting Vidya. They had informed Vidya that her brother Pandian was in Singapore to conceal his true activities as a thief. Ultimately, the imposter Yercaud Subramaniam is arrested. Pandian and Geetha get married, and in a comedic finale, Pandian is seen making arrangements at the gift money section, only to discover that Govindan, alias Selvamani collecting the gift money and escaping.

== Cast ==
- Pandiarajan as Pandian / Rajan
- Pallavi as Geetha
- Sunitha as Vidya, Pandian's sister
- Jaishankar as Thangadurai, Geetha's father
- Senthil as Govindan / Selvamani, Rajan's friend
- Kalaipuli G. Sekaran as Nayagam
- Malaysia Vasudevan as Yercaud Subramanian
- Loose Mohan as a fake priest
- Thyagu as Principal and Ice Mama's brother-in-law
- S. S. Chandran as Lawyer Varadharajan
- Kumarimuthu as a lunatic
- Joker Thulasi as a lunatic
- Charle as a reporter
- Chinni Jayanth as Uttalakkadi Ulaganathan, a reporter
- T. K. S. Natarajan as Peon
- Peeli Sivam as Muthu
- Thideer Kannaiah as Doctor
- King Kong as Kuttaiyan
- Bayilvan Ranganathan as Chinnasamy, an auctioneer
- Oru Viral Krishna Rao as a patient
- Omakkuchi Narasimman as a lunatic
- Kishmu as Manickam "Ice mama"
- Achamillai Gopi as Dr. Ramkumar, Vidya's husband

== Production ==
The film's title is derived from a song from Padikkadavan (1985). The song "Pathirikkai Anrargale" was shot at a jail in Thanjavur.

== Soundtrack ==
All songs were written by Vaali and composed by Gangai Amaran.

Title	Singer(s)	Length
"Enna Chinnam"	Malaysia Vasudevan and Chorus	4:47
"Thalattuven Kanmani"	Jayachandran	4:33
"Pathirikkai Anrargale"	Mano, Chorus	4:26
"Silu Silu Siluvena"	S. P. Balasubrahmanyam, S. Janaki	5:01

== Reception ==
Jayamanmadhan of Kalki criticised many of the comedy sequences for lacking relevance to the story, but noted that they would make children of all ages laugh.
