= Jameen Kottai =

- Directed by: Ramchandar
- Written by: Kalaipuli G. Sekaran
- Produced by: Pon. Kumar
- Starring: Kalaipuli G. Sekaran, Mohini & Seetha
- Cinematography: Raveendar
- Edited by: Lakshmi Shankar
- Music by: Sirpy
- Production company: Thiraiparavai
- Release date: 14 December 1995
- Running time: 130 minutes
- Country: India
- Language: Tamil

Jameen Kottai is a 1995 Indian Tamil-language horror film directed by Ramchandar and written by Kalaipuli G. Sekaran. The film stars Kalaipuli G. Sekaran and Mohini, with Ra. Sankaran, King Kong, P. R. Varalakshmi, Bayilvan Ranganathan and Boopathi Raja playing supporting roles. Jameen Kottai was produced by Pon Kumar with a musical score written by Sirpy. The film was released on the 14 December 1995.

== Plot ==
The title of the film, Jameen Kottai, refers to a remote, haunted location where the main events takes place.

The local villagers fear Jameen Kottai and the guards that protect it. Many believe that a secret treasure is hidden in the palace. One day, Ra. Sankaran and his daughter, Mohini, arrive at the palace where she has a vision of a past life. Meanwhile, an elderly lady secretly records the conversation of a group plotting to retrieve the treasure. She later gives the recording to Manickam, who finds a clue relating to the location of the treasure, which then leads him to Karuvapatti. Manickam(Bayilvan Ranganathan) and his friend Prakash decide to buy the land in order to start searching for the treasure before others do. They are small-time crooks who want the treasure at any cost. They plow the land and uncover a large object carved with hideous figures.

Madasamy(Kalaipuli G. Sekaran) is a skilled locksmith who lives with his sister Rajeshwari. He discovers that the village's doctor, Vasanth, is secretly in love with his sister, and he decides to arrange their marriage. The doctor's family asks for a huge dowry for his sister, which Madasamy accepts. He then decides to find work in the city hoping to earn a greater salary. As Madasamy is leaving the village, he meets Prakash and Manickam who ask him for a favour. They offer him money to accompany them to the palace.

The three visit the palace that same night, and Madasamy manages to open its main safe. Prakash and Manickam give him enough money to fund his sister's wedding and Madasamy leaves. In the safe, a manuscript explains how to obtain the treasure. A few days later, on the night of the full moon, Prakash and Manickam return to the palace. There, Prakash beats up Manickam with the intention of keeping the treasure for himself. Alone, Prakash conducts the ritual as described in the manuscript. However, to his astonishment, he summons a satanic spirit that ends up killing him. The spirit flees the palace and encounters Rajeshwari, "possessing" her body.

Meanwhile, Madasamy arranges his sister's wedding and goes to Chennai to consult an astrologer. The astrologer says his sister's marriage will happen successfully, but Ra. Sankaran says it will not. Madasamy gets angry and tries to beat him. In the ensuing scuffle, Madasamy is arrested by the police.

Rajeshwari faints during the wedding ceremony and the groom's family halt the proceedings. The groom, Vasanth, questions the paternity of the child Rajeshwari is revealed to be carrying. Still possessed by the evil spirit, she kills Vasanth. Madasamy returns home to discover his sister has murdered her lover. He takes his sister to a doctor, but the doctor is a fraud who has been conjured by the devil and declares Rajeshwari not pregnant. Ra. Sankaran then discovers that the doctor is an aspect of the evil spirit, eventually killing him. The murder of Ra. Sankaran is observed by Madasamy in a reflection on the water that reveals the doctor in his true ghostly form.

Ra. Sankaran advises him to go to Ammapettai Kali temple to discover the truth. He complies and finds that in his previous life he was a general in Jameen Kottai. The Jameen wanted to be immortal and so on the advice of Mahakanni, an old sorceress, he planned to kill 99 people who were born in Rohini star and Kanni Lagna. Since Madasamy had the same Nakshatra, he was killed. Madasamy planned to marry Mohini. Mahakanni advises Jameen to have sex with Rajeshwari who is a sister to Madasamy and sacrifice the child to Satan. Jameen and his men try to rape Mohini and Rajeshwari, but Mohini, using her power of chastity, burns Jameen and his army. Due to his sacrifices, Jameen's heart is not destroyed and Mahakanni promises Jameen that on the 7th generation, they will be reborn and fulfil his destiny. Madasamy tries to possess Jameen Kottai and destroy the heart, but the spirits make him old and sap him of his youth. The Supreme Goddess Bhadrakali, who is a famous deity in the preceding devotional neighbourhood village Ammanoor, then kills the Satanic spirit from the Jameen Kottai and saves everyone in the village. Thus the film concludes with a happy, and devotional ending.

== Cast ==
- Kalaipuli G. Sekaran as Madasamy and Vikraman
- Mohini
- Seetha Ayas
- Ra. Sankaran
- King Kong as Pandi
- P. R. Varalakshmi as Sujatha
- Bayilvan Ranganathan as Prakash
- Boopathi Raja as Soolaiah
- Ennatha Kannaiya as astrologer
- Thideer Kannaiah
- Rajkumaresh
- Rajgopi
- Rajdev
- Chinnaiah
- Kalpana as Mahakanni
- M. Rathnakumar
- Dharma
- Jayaprakash
- Vellore Vijayakumar
- Babu
- Vaman Malini as Dancer
- Mohini as Rajeshwari

== Soundtrack ==
The soundtrack was composed by Sirpy, with lyrics written by Kalidasan.

Song	Singer(s)	Duration
"Manichittu Thaalatile"	Unni Menon	4:26
"Mannalantha Nayagiye"	Vani Jairam	5:16
"Naan Paadum Raagam"	Sujatha	4:37
"Sirikka Vanga"	Mano	4:38
"Thennamara Cholai"	Ananthu, Swarnalatha	4:08

== Reception ==
The Hindu wrote, "The crux of G. Sekharan's story (screenplay and dialogue also his) is ideally suited for exploitation but financial constraints have curbed such an intention, the director Ramchandar making best of the available talent and facilities. Naturally, the inadequacies in the performance of the artistes are made good by the computer works".
