= David Samoylov =

Russian poet

David Samuilovich Samoylov (Russian: Давид Самуилович Самойлов, born Kaufman, (Russian: Кауфман); 1 June 1920 — 23 February 1990) was one of the most notable representatives of the War generation of Russian poets and neo-Acmeist poetry.

== Biography ==
Samoylov was born in Moscow into an assimilated Jewish family. His father was the head of venereological hospital authority of the Moscow region.

In 1938—1941 he was a student at MIFLI, the Moscow Institute of Philosophy, Literature, and History. He tried to volunteer for the army when the war with Finland broke out, but was refused for health reasons. At the outbreak of Operation Barbarossa he was refused again, this time for being overage. Instead he served in a trench digging brigade. There he contracted the typhoid fever and was evacuated to Samarkand, where he studied at a pedagogical college after his recovery. After that he entered an infantry officers' school, from which he graduated in 1942, and was sent to the Volkhov front. He remained on the active duty until the end of the war and was wounded several times.

During the second half of his life, he moved to Pärnu, known mostly as a resort-town. He continued writing in Pärnu and even published poetry dedicated to Pärnu. He lived in Toominga street.

He has translated literature from Estonian authors such as Lydia Koidula, Jaan Kross, Ellen Niit, Paul-Eerik Rummo and others, as well as from Polish, Czech, Hungarian and other languages as well as running workshops for young writers.

== Death ==
David died on February 23, 1990, in Tallinn. He was buried in Pärnu (Estonia) at the Forest Cemetery.

== Selected works ==
- When We Were at War (Rus. Когда мы были на войне)
