= Pochvennichestvo =

19th-century Russian nationalist movement

Pochvennichestvo (/ˈpɒtʃvɛnɪtʃɛstvoʊ/ POTCH-veh-NITCH-est-voh; Russian: почвенничество, IPA: [ˈpot͡ɕvʲɪnnʲɪt͡ɕɪstvə], roughly "return to the native soil", from почва "soil") was a late 19th-century movement in Russia that tied in closely with its contemporary ideology, Slavophilia.

== History ==
The Slavophiles and the Pochvennichestvo supported the complete emancipation of serfs, stressed a strong desire to return to the idealised past of Russian history, and opposed Europeanization. They also advocated a complete rejection of the nihilist, classical liberal and Marxist movements of the time. They laid a primary focus on changing Russian society by the humbling of the self and on social reform through the Russian Orthodox Church, rather than through the radical programs of (for example) the Westernizer intelligentsia.

The Slavophiles and the Pochvennichestvo differed in that the former detested the Westernisation policies of Emperor Peter the Great (r. 1682–1725), but the latter praised what they saw as the benefits of the notorious ruler who maintained a strong patriotic mentality for what became sloganised under Emperor Nicholas I (r. 1825–1855) as "Orthodoxy, Autocracy, and Nationality". Another major difference was that many of the leaders of Pochvennichestvo and their supporters adopted a militant anti-Protestant, anti-Catholic and antisemitic stance.

The movement had its roots in the works of the German philosopher Johann Gottfried Herder (1744–1803), who focused primarily on emphasising the differences between peoples and regional cultures. In addition, it rejected the universalism of the Enlightenment period. Pochvennichestvo originated in the early 1850s with the "young editors" working at the journal Moskvityanin. The most prominent Russian intellectuals who founded the movement were Apollon Grigoryev (1822–1864), Nikolay Strakhov (1828–1896), Nikolay Danilevsky (1822–1885) and Konstantin Leontyev (1831–1891).

Fyodor Dostoyevsky (1821–1881) also came to support such views, as expressed in his 1873 novel Demons. The ideology was later adopted by Emperors Alexander III (r. 1881–1894) and Nicholas II (r. 1894–1917).

== See also ==
- Ivan Ilyin
- Georgy Samchenko
- Narodism
- Westernizer, advocacy of Westernisation in Russia
- Völkisch movement
- Going to the People
