= Muthapudupet =

Muthapudupettai
- Locality in Avadi
- Country: India
- State: Tamil Nadu
- District: Thiruvallur
- Metro: Chennai

Government
  - Body: Avadi Municipal Corporation
- Elevation: 10 m (33 ft)

Languages
  - Official: Tamil
- Time zone: UTC+5:30 (IST)
- PIN: 600055
- Telephone code: 044
- Nearest city: Chennai
- Civic agency: Avadi Municipal Corporation
- Climate: Tropical (Köppen)
- Avg. summer temperature: 35–39 °C (95–102 °F)
- Avg. winter temperature: 20–30 °C (68–86 °F)

Muthapudupet is a sublocality of Pattabiram in Avadi which is a neighbourhood in Chennai. India. It is part of the Avadi Municipal Corporation limit and Chennai Metropolitan area. Muthapudupet is around 700 metres from Pattabiram E Depot Railway Station, 2.5 km from TIDEL Park (Pattabiram, Avadi) and 7 km from Avadi Junction and 29 km from Chennai Central. The Chennai Outer Ring Road (ORR) and CTH Road passes near Muthapudupet.

Areas around the Muthapudupet were once paddy fields, fruit farms, lakes and swamps. Now agrilculture is less and residential development has occurred. The soil is sandy and instantial laterite, mostly Recent Alluvium. Geological formations are concealed by Recent alluvium, with little or no exposure of rocks, most formations being Archean and tertiary sediments. Alluvial deposits of thickness of 28 m (92 ft), can amplify ground shaking during Tremors.

Muthapudupet is a predominantly Tamil speaking area with sizable Malayalam and Telugu speakers. Most people here are multilingual, speaking Tamil and Hindi or English. One can find people from every region of India in Muthapudupet-Mittanamallee due to nearby IT and Defence/Central Government establishments. Central Government is the largest employer in Muthapudupet.

== IT parks ==
A new TIDEL park (IT Park) with some 50 IT companies was under construction in Avadi- Pattabiram near Muthapudupet in MTH road. The first of phase of the project was expected to begin 2024.

== Transport ==
Railways Muthapudupet is served by Pattabiram Military Siding 'E' Depot Sub-urban Railway station. This station has one platform and accommodates a 9-car rake and 12- car rake is the terminus of EMU 'Siding' or 'S' and PRES OR PTMS Train. Regular Train service start at 0320 hrs in the morning and Last train is at 2120 hrs. There are trains towards Chennai Beach railway station at 0820 hrs, 1720 hrs and 2030hrs. Trains from Chennai Central to Military Siding begins at 0415 hrs and ends at 2230 hrs. Trains ply at hourly bases.

Roadways Metropolitan Transport Corporation (Chennai) (MTC) buses ply frequently between Avadi and Muthapudupet. Apart from buses, auto's are available on ready bases. Except during odd hours, Uber/ Ola cabs do ply as well.

== Facilities ==
There is one Multi Specialty Clinic (Srimi Clinic) two general clinics, six medical shops and a lab in Muthapudupet. There is a Station Sick Quarters at the Air Force Station, which caters only Air Force Personnel. Nearby hospitals are Grace Hospital, Pattabiram (3.0 km [1.9 mi]) Avadi Govt General Hospital (8 km [5.0 mi]), Sir Ivan Stedeford Hospital (12 km [7.5 mi] towards Ambattur). There is a military hospital 4.0 km [2.5 mi] towards Avadi for defence personnel.

T8 Muthapudupet Police Station falls under the Avadi range and was situated back of Ayyappan Temple, Muthapudupet. In 2018, the police moved to a newly constructed building near Palavedu near ORR highway road.

Main roads are maintained by Avadi Municipal Corporation, Air Force, CRPF and HVF.

== Highways ==
Six lane Outer Ring Road (Chennai ORR) Connecting Minjur with Vandaloor, bypassing Chennai and suburbs passes tangentially at Muthapudupet.

== Other info ==
Electricity is provided by Tamil Nadu Electricity Board via 11 kV feeders from Pattabiram SS (urban) and Thirunindravur SS (rural). High voltage distribution is to be erected.

Wired landline services are provided by BSNL. Muthapudupet comes under Brindavan Nagar Exchange, 044 2684 1000. A typical landline number is 044 2684 xxxx. All major telecom companies have towers in Muthapudupet.

== Education ==
Schools include:

- Avadi Municipality Middle School, Muthapudupet.
- Kindergarten, Butterfly School, St. Mary's School, Air Force Kindergarten, Carmel
- Mitnamallee LP and UP school, Palavedu LP school
- Butterfly school, St. Mary's School, Vijayantha Schools at Avadi, Chennai.
- CBSE schools, Kendriya Vidyalaya Air Force Station, Air Force School.

There are four other Kendriya Vidyalayas in Avadi also serve Muthapudupet.

The colleges are Aalim Muhammed Salegh College Of Engineering, Aalim Muhammed Salegh Polytechnic College and Aalim Muhammed Salegh Academy of Architecture.
