= Poet-Frontliners =

Poet-Frontliners (Russian: Поэты-фронтовики, lit: Poet-Frontliners, also known as the War Generation and Front Poets) is a name applied to the young Russian poets whose youth was spent fighting during World War II and whose best poems reflect upon wartime experiences. Frontliners also included painters and cinematographers. The year 1924 is regarded as the beginning of the "Poet-Frontliners" generation, as many of the poets within this movement were students and young adults at the beginning of World War II. However, others regard the "front-Line poets" as being those around in their early 20s at the beginning of the Great Patriotic War.

== History ==
Following the return of the artists who had been sent to the front in the 1940s, they were keen on sharing their experiences with their respective art forms. Because of the horror of what they witnessed, there was a desire to showcase how their worldviews had been drastically altered thanks to the war. According to Dr. Alexander Gribkov, "Even during the war, these poets expressed both the strength of the human spirit and the strength of national consciousness, which would become the key to our victory, in a simple, poetic language understandable to every reader, without using ideological clichés." As Soviet poetry scholar Vera Sandomirsky notes, one of the most acclaimed "Front Poets" was Konstantin Simonov. In his poetry, he notes how the Russian peasants were mistreated by German forces and thus were forced to protect their homeland despite their inadequate political expertise (politgramotnost).

== Themes ==
A hallmark of the works created by those sent to the war was the realistic depiction of war and the toll it takes on the idea of post-war optimism. Another tenant of Front-line poetry is a religion and the liberation of one's fear over death. The poetry, while lacking in organizational complexity and sophistication, was directly connected with the experiences of fighting and the resulting psychological impact.

In Vera Sandomirsky's words:

"In creating new values, it became above all a loud-speaker for collective feelings, aspirations, and experiences. It became We poetry."

== Venue ==
Front-line poetry was written in the spaces of war, meaning factories, trenches, and other venues close to the battle area. Because of its cathartic element, it was often spoken in the same spaces it was written.

== Notable Poets ==
Among the most well-known of the "Poet-Frontliners" include:

1. Vasily Semenovich Grossman
2. Yulia Vladimirovna Drunina
3. Alexander Petrovich Mezhirov
4. Sergei Sergeevich Orlov
5. Nikolai Mayorov
6. Musa Cälil
7. Bulat Okudzhava
8. Pavel Kogan
9. Elena Shirman
10. Yuri Bondarev
11. Joseph Utkin
12. Boris Kostrov
13. Boris Smolensky

== List of Other Poets ==
- Alexander Artyomov (1912-1942)
- Eduard Asadov (1923-2004)
- Vsevolod Bagritsky (1922-1942)
- Bronislav Kezhun (1914 - 1984)
- Yuri Belash (1920-1988)
- Evgeny Vinokurov (1925-1993)
- Pavel Vintman (1918-1942)
- Semyon Gudzenko (1922-1953)
- Ion Degen (1925-2017)
- Mustai Karim (1919-2005)
- Fatih Karim (1909-1945)
- Pavel Kogan (1918-1942)
- Mikhail Kulchitsky (1919-1943)
- Konstantin Levin (1924-1984)
- Yuri Levitansky (1922-1996)
- Semyon Lipkin (1911-2003)
- Mark Lisyansky (1913-1993)
- Mikhail Lvov (1918-1988)
- Nikolai Mayorov (1919-1942)
- Alexander Mezhirov (1923-2009)
- Sergei Ostrovoy (1911-2005)
- Nikolai Panchenko (1924-2005)
- Alexander Revich (1921-2012)
- Nikolai Rylenkov (1909-1969)
- David Samoilov (1920-1990)
- Yan Satunovsky (1913-1982)
- Mikhail Svetlov (1903-1964)
- Ilya Selvinsky (1899-1968)
- Konstantin Simonov (1915-1979)
- Boris Slutsky (1919-1986)
- Yaroslav Smelyakov (1913-1972)
- Nikolai Starshinov (1924-1998)
- Vadim Strelchenko (1912-194?)
- Georgy Suvorov (1919-1944)
- Alexey Surkov (1899-1983)
- Fedor Sukhov (1922-1992)
- Arseny Tarkovsky (1907-1989)
- Alexander Tvardovsky (1910-1971)
- Nikolai Tikhonov (1896-1979)
- Joseph Utkin (1903-1944)
- Alexey Fatyanov (1919-1959)
- Pavel Shubin (1914-1951)
- Habib Yusufi (1916-1945)

== Gallery ==
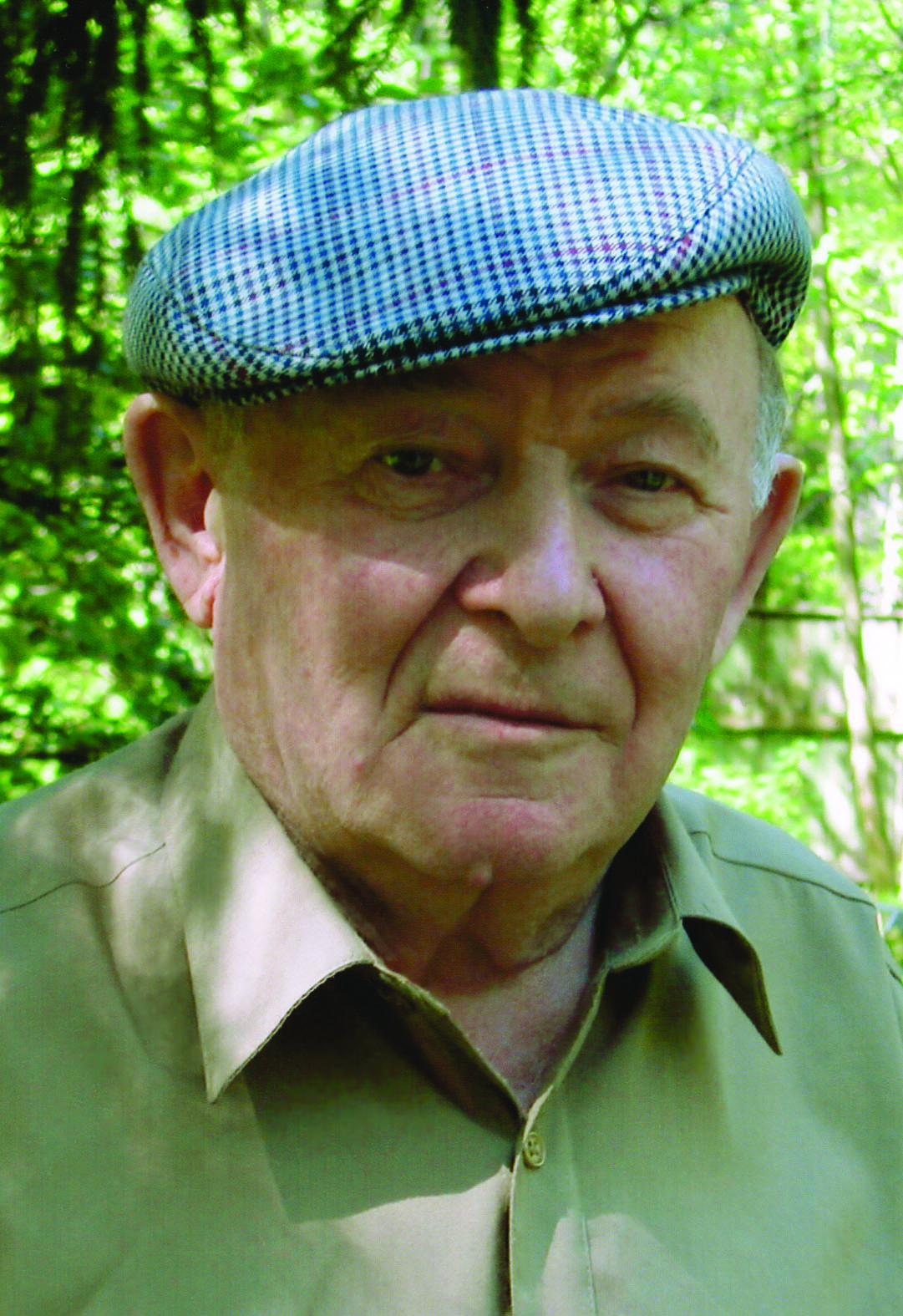
Konstantin Yakovlevich Vanshenkin (1925-2012)

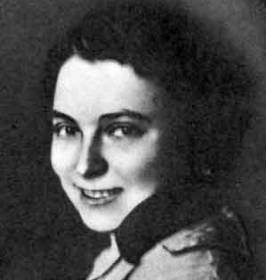
Elena Mihailovna Shirman (1908–1942)

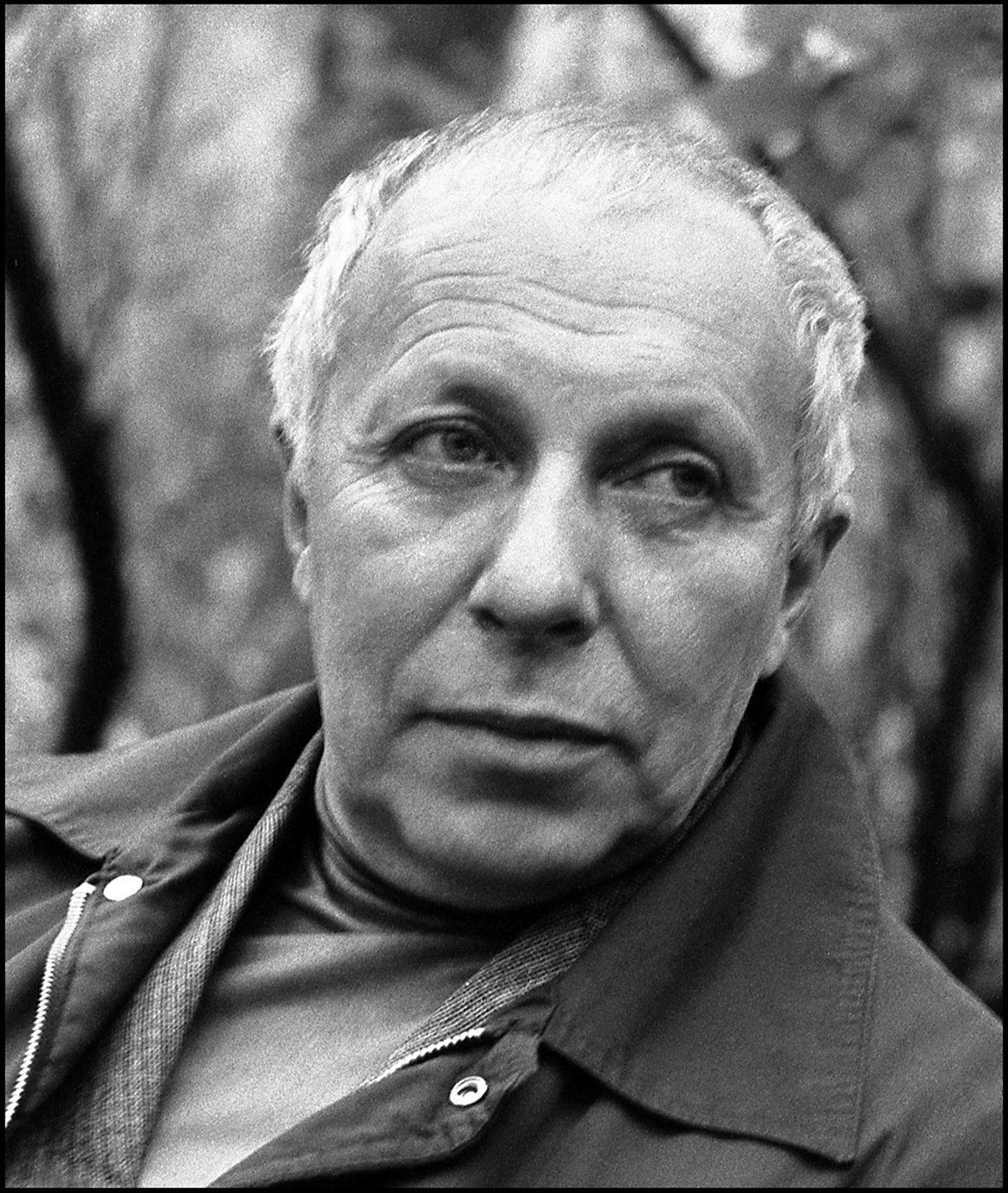
Alexander Mezhirov (1923-2009)

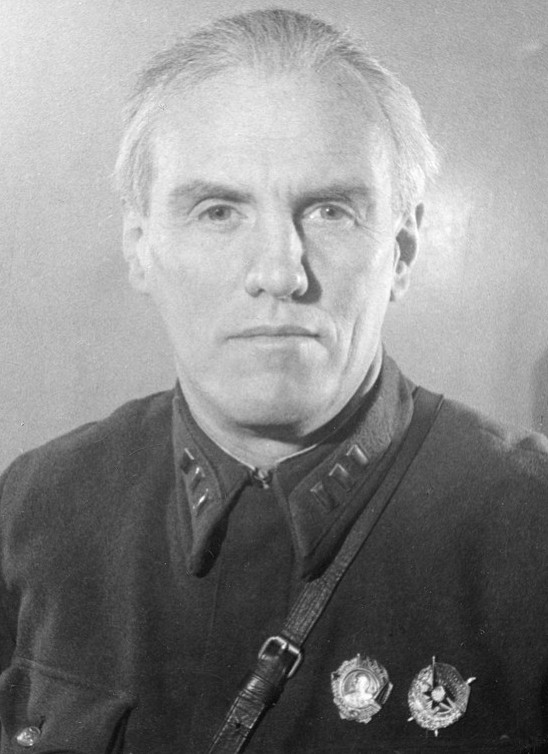
Nikolai Semenovich Tikhonov (1896-1979)

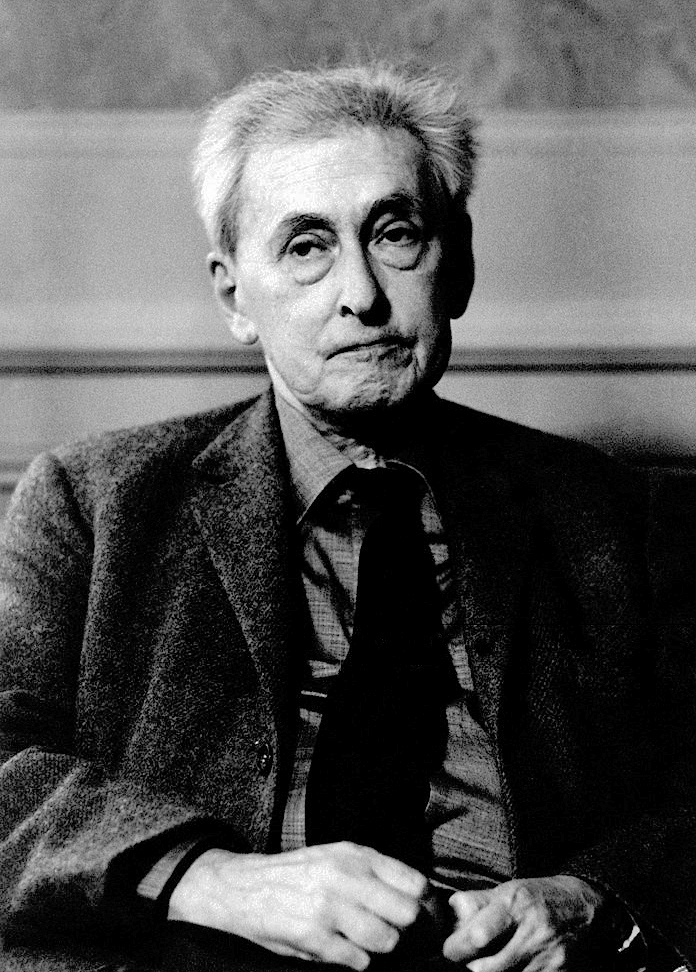
Ilya Grigoryevich Ehrenburg (1891-1967)

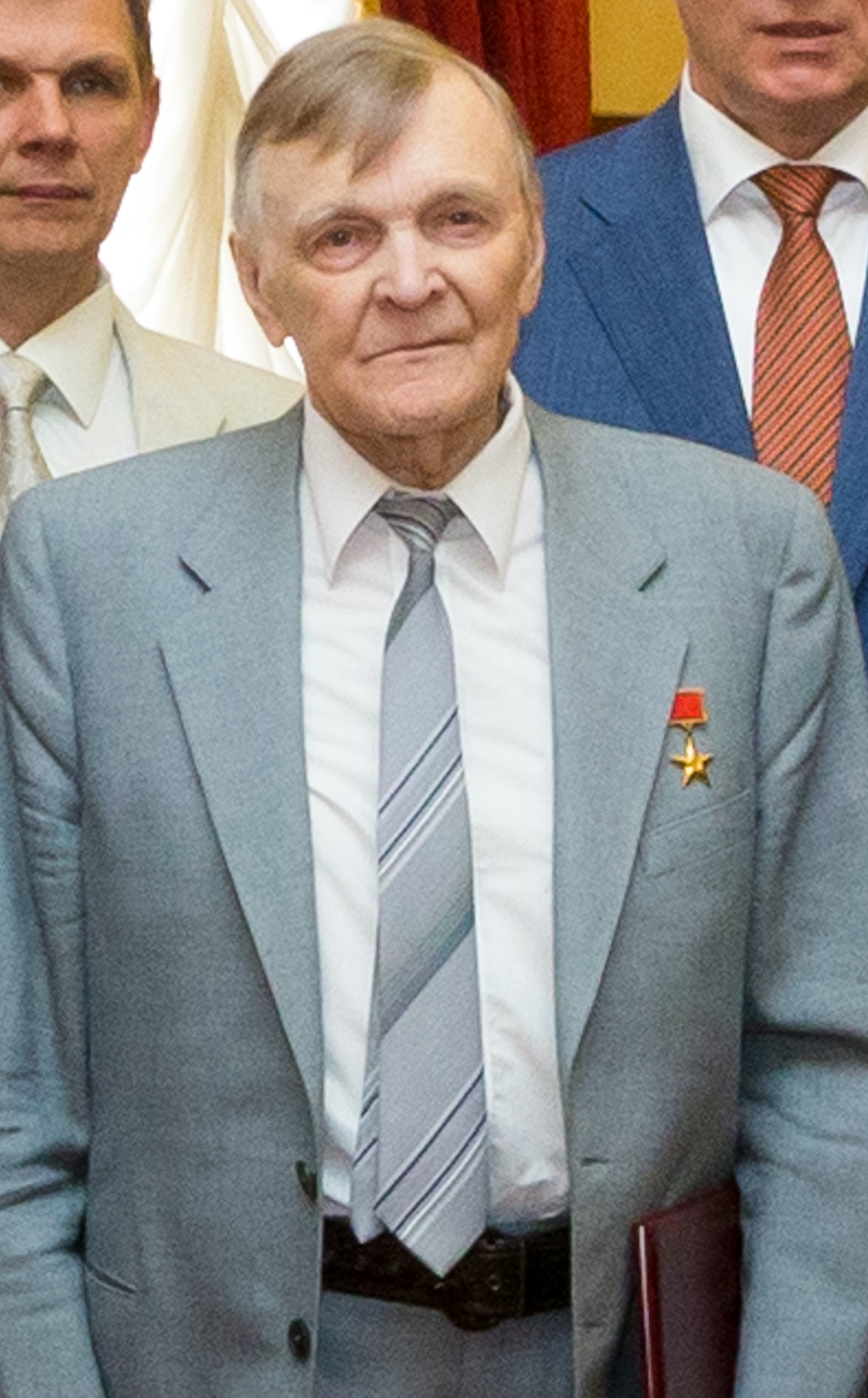
Yuri Vasilyevich Bondarev (1924-2020)

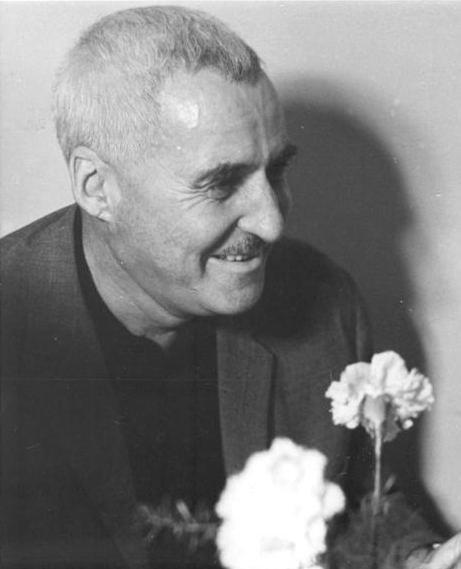
Konstantin Mikhailovich Simonov (1915-1979)
