= Aron Vergelis =

Soviet poet and Jewish journalist

Aron Vergelis (Yiddish: אהרן װערגעליס; Russian: Аро́н А́лтерович Верге́лис; 7 May 1918, in Liubar (now in Zhytomyr Oblast) – 7 April 1999, in Moscow) was a Soviet poet and Jewish journalist who wrote in Yiddish.

== Biography ==
Born into a Ukrainian Jewish shtetl family, Vergelis attended high school in Birobidzhan, Jewish Autonomous Oblast, Soviet Union, where his parents had moved in 1932. He published his first works in 1935 and his first collection of poems in 1940, the same year he graduated from the Lenin Moscow Pedagogical Institute. He took part in World War II, worked as an editor of Yiddish-language radio broadcasts and after the war as secretary of the Jewish department of the Union of Soviet Writers.

He was one of the few Jewish writers who managed to avoid the purges of 1948–1953. In 1955, he became a member of the CPSU. From 1961 on, he served as editor-in-chief of the Yiddish-language journal Sovetish Heymland (Soviet Homeland) while participating in Soviet anti-Zionist campaigns.

In 1963 Vergelis travelled to the United States as part of an official delegation, making him the first Jewish cultural figure to visit America since the Second World War.

== Views ==
Recognized in the West as the mouthpiece of Soviet state policies in respect to Jews (which likely overstated his real role as the editor of a publication which remained relatively obscure to non-Jews in the Soviet Union), Vergelis rejected claims that Soviet Jews were suffering from discrimination and assimilation, arguing that the needs of Jewish culture in the Soviet Union were being satisfied.

Due to his unshakeable loyalty to the Soviet regime, in 1976 Vergelis was declared by Elie Wiesel to be an "enemy of Jewish people".
