= Comrades' court =

Collective justice institutions in the Soviet Union

A Comrades' court (Russian: Товарищеский суд, verb. "court of comrades") was a special form of collective justice that existed in the Soviet Union. Comrades' courts were elected for the term of two years by open voting of working collective members, and were entitled to consider minor offences and to impose fines up to 50 Rbls (compared to the average monthly salary of 120 Rbls) or to pass the case for consideration to regular courts of justice. After the breakdown of the Soviet Union comrades' courts were no longer elected and were finally abolished by adoption of Russia's new Criminal Code in 1997.

== See also ==
- Magistrate's court
- Nyaya panchayat – System of dispute resolution at the village level
- Panchayati raj – Indian political system
