= Yaar Kannan =

Indian film director and screenwriter

- Born: Govindasamy Kannan; October 12, 1957 (age 68); Madukur, Pattukottai
- Other name: Madukur Kannan
- Occupations: Director, actor, lyricist

Yaar Kannan is an Indian film director and screenwriter who has worked on Tamil films. He made his debut with the 1985 with the horror film Yaar? and regularly collaborated with Ramarajan in the late 1980s.

== Career ==
After assisting Mahendran, Kannan made his debut as a filmmaker by directing Yaar? (1985), a horror film which gave a breakthrough to actor Arjun in the Tamil film industry. The success of the film prompted the director to use the film's name as a prefix and he subsequently went on to make several films in the late 1980s with Ramarajan including Namma Ooru Nayagan (1988), Anbu Kattalai (1989) and Kaavalan (1990).

Kannan made a comeback with Yuga (2006), a low-budget science-fiction film featuring Richard, 'Ice' Ashok and Manikandan. Produced by fifty-eight financiers, the film received negative reviews and performed poorly at the box office. He then supervised the Tamil version of the Telugu film Punnami Naagu featuring Mumaith Khan and helped release it as Pournami Naagam (2010). The film failed to recreate the success of the original Telugu version. In 2010, he planned a fantasy trilingual film titled Piravi with Master Vinay in the lead role, though the venture failed to materialise.

He has let several aspiring directors apprentice under him, including Azhagan Selva of Azhagumagan, Suriya Nithi of Vilambaram and actor Maruthi of Marumunai. In the 2010s, Kannan has made appearances as an actor in films, working twice with director Prabhu Solomon and with director Ponram in the film Varuthapadatha Valibar Sangam.

== Filmography ==
=== Films ===
Director

| Year | Film | Notes |
|---|---|---|
| 1982 | Vadivangal | |
| 1985 | Yaar? | |
| 1986 | Unnai Onru Ketpen | |
| 1986 | Kanne Kaniyamuthe | |
| 1988 | Namma Ooru Nayagan | |
| 1989 | Anbu Kattalai | |
| 1990 | Kaavalan | |
| 1994 | Magudikkaran | |
| 2006 | Yuga | |
| 2010 | Pournami Nagam | Reused some footage from Punnami Naagu (2009) |

Actor

- Kasu (2006)
- Pazhani (2008)
- Kumki (2012)
- Varuthapadatha Valibar Sangam (2013)
- Kayal (2014)
- Purampokku Engira Podhuvudamai (2015)
- Manithan (2016)
- Kadalai (2016)
- Eeswaran (2021)
- Meendum (2021)
- 1945 (2022)
- Kazhuvethi Moorkkan (2023)
- Moothakudi (2023)
- Vaa Vaathiyaar (2026)

Lyrics

- "Alli Thandha Bhoomi" - Nandu
- "Metti Metti" - Metti

=== Television ===
Director

- Jenmam X (Vijay TV)
- Jananam (Mega TV)

Actor

| Director/Producer | Serial | Notes |
|---|---|---|
| K. Balachander | Raghuvamsam | |
| Shakthi Rajendran | Malligai Mullai | |
| UTV | Jenmam X | |
| Aabavanan | Sundaravanam | |
| Revathi | Chinna Chinna Aasai | |
| Radhika | Marupiravi | |
| Chitra | Maanasa | |
| Vista Vision | Mangai | |
| Harirajan | Thozhigal | |
| Sathya Jyothi Films | Gopuram | |
| Vista Vision | Avalum Penthane | |
| Mega TV | Jananam | |
| Ramya Krishnan & Kutti Padmini | Kalasam | |
| Abinaya Creation | Pallavi Anu Pallavi | |
| Vikatan Televistas | Run | |
| J. S. Nandhini | Inspector Rishi | |
