= Mannivakkam =

Neighbourhood in Kanchipuram district, Tamil Nadu, India

- Town
- Location in Metropolitan Chennai
- Coordinates: 12.8938984°N 80.0633027°E
- Country: India
- State: Tamil Nadu
- Metro: Chennai

Languages
  - Official: Tamil
- Time zone: UTC+5:30 (IST)
- PIN: 600048
- Vehicle registration: TN-11

Mannivakkam is a town near Chennai Metropolitan City in the Indian state of Tamil-Nadu India. Mannivakkam lies between Vandalur and Mudichur, 7.5 kilometers from Tambaram and 2 kilometers from Vandalur. Mannivakkam is listed in CMDA's Chennai Metropolitan Area (CMA) master plan as village number 1 under Kattankolathur Panchayat Union. The town is well connected with industrial areas such as Oragadam and Sriperambadur by road and also with Maraimalai Nagar and Mahindra World City, Chennai by road as well as suburban railways.

== Transportation ==
The nearest railway station to Mannivakkam is Vandalur. Other railway stations within five kilometers are in Urappakkam, Perungulattur, and Guduvancheri and Tambaram 7.5 Kilometers. The proposed Killambakkam Bus Terminus for south bound government and private buses is situated within 5 kilometers. Metropolitan Transport Corporation (MTC) operates bus number 55, 79K, 579 and 583 along with small bus S79 and S89 connecting Mannivakkam with various locations such as Tambaram, Oragadam, Sriperambadur, Velachery and Broadway. The area has good road connectivity to important places in around Chennai. Tambaram is accessible by two major roads one passing through Mudichur and the other through Perungalathur. Outer Ring Road (ORR) or SH234 passes through the locality connecting the area to northern parts of Chennai. State-Highway 48 connects the area to Chennai-Bangalore Highway NH 48 through Wallajabad and Kanchipuram or through Oragadam and Sriperambadur. Additionally, Chennai Metro Rail has initiated a feasibility study for extending the airport line till the proposed Kilambakkam Bus Terminus.

== Schools in and around Mannivakkam ==
- Sri Vishwa Vidyalaya Hr Secondary School 0.5 km
- PERI International public school-0.5 km
- Narayana e-Techno school-0.5 km
- Mannivakkam High School 0.7 km
- Govt High School Otteri Extension 1.0 km
- Crescent School 1.5 km
- Shalom School 1.5 km
- shri natesan vidyasala matriculation hr.sec.schl
- Shri Nikethan CBSE 1.2 km
- Alwin International Public School CBSE 3 km
- Shri Velammal CBSE 6 km
- Tianno Vidhyasram CBSE 7 km
- Holy Sai International School 5 km
