= Sovetish Heymland =

Yiddish-language literary magazine, 1961–1991

- Type: Monthly newspaper
- Publisher: Aron Vergelis
- Founded: 1961
- Language: Yiddish
- Ceased publication: 1991
- Country: Soviet Union

Sovetish Heymland (Yiddish סאָוועטיש היימלאַנד - "Soviet Homeland") was a Yiddish-language literary magazine published by poet and controversial figure (for his participation in the Soviet official "anti-Zionist" campaign) Aron Vergelis in Moscow as a bi-monthly from 1961 to 1965, then as a monthly until 1991. With the dissolution of the Soviet Union, the journal no longer received state support. In the early 1960s, Sovetish Heymland had a circulation of 25,000, the highest ever circulation for a Yiddish-language periodical. The circulation fell to 16,000 in 1966; to 10,000 in 1971; to 7,000 in 1978; and to 5,000 in 1985. Although the journal's circulation had fallen dramatically, donations solicited from the United States, France and Argentina in the early 1990s enabled Vergelis to continue publishing the journal under the name Di Yidishe Gas (Yiddish די יידישע גאַס - "The Jewish Street") from 1993 until his death in July 1999.

Sovetish Heymland was developed in the period after the death of Joseph Stalin in 1953 as a forum for those Yiddish writers who had survived the repressions of Soviet Yiddish which had occurred in the late 1940s and early 1950s. The title referred back to the Moscow-based Yiddish literary periodicals Sovetish (1934–1941) and Heymland (1947–1948), indicating a continuity of Yiddish literary output. In addition to being the official Yiddish periodical of the Union of Soviet Writers, one of the main aims of the journal was to disseminate Soviet propaganda among Yiddish-speaking Jewish Communists in the United States, Canada, and elsewhere. In addition, the publication of a highly literary Yiddish-language journal was meant to show that Yiddish and Yiddish cultural institutions were not disappearing, but that there was in fact a Yiddish revival occurring in the Soviet Union, and that Sovetish Heymland in particular was taking the lead in maintaining Yiddish culture. As part of this propaganda, Vergelis published numerous anti-Zionist and anti-Israel articles. Vergelis' controversial reputation as a tool of Leonid Brezhnev and the Communist government is based largely on these articles, as well as several articles attacking his critics from outside the Soviet Union. In addition, the fact that Sovetish Heymland was authorized by the government indicated to some that Vergelis was merely a mouthpiece for Soviet propaganda.

In addition to literary articles, the journal published materials on Jewish folklore, history, language and literature in Yiddish, the magazine also collected biographical and bibliographical material about Jewish writers. In the 25th anniversary issue of Sovetish Heymland in August 1986, Vergelis announced that the journal had published 76 novels, 109 novellas, 1,478 short stories, 6,680 poems, and 1,628 articles dealing with literary criticism and the arts. It was also one of the few periodicals to encourage the younger generation of Soviet Yiddish writers. As the only Yiddish-language journal that was officially allowed by the Soviet authorities from the 1960s through the 1980s, Sovetish Heymland, under the editorship of Vergelis, was connected with almost all of the period's cultural output. Vergelis became an "unofficial censor of all Yiddish-language literature and the chief Central Committee consultant on matters relating to Soviet Jews."

In May 2024, it was announced every issue of Sovetish heymland will be fully digitized.
