= Smena (magazine) =

Russian literary magazine

Смена
- Categories: Literary magazine
- Frequency: 2 issues per month (1924-1929), (1932), (1939-1992), 3 issues per month (1930-1), monthly (1933-1939), (1992-present)
- Publisher: Molodaya Gvardiya, Pravda,
- Founded: 1924
- First issue: January 1924
- Country: Soviet Union, Russia
- Based in: Moscow
- Language: Russian
- Website: https://smena-online.ru

Smena (Russian: Смена; IPA: [ˈsmʲenə]; lit. 'Change') is a formerly Soviet, now Russian, illustrated magazine first published in January 1924 by Molodaya Gvardiya, the publisher of the Komsomol press, and subsequently by the publisher Pravda. It appeared twice monthly, including analytical and polemical journalism alongside fiction and poetry. Smena today continues to publish literary fiction and reporting. In its early years Smena was one of several magazines aimed explicitly at young people that was part of a rich early Soviet print culture designed both as propaganda, and to educate its readership and discuss their concerns.

It is impossible to directly translate the word смена from Russian, as it encapsulates several meanings relevant to the revolutionary project of which the magazine participated. With definitions including “shift,” and “replacement,” and suggestive of generational change, the title reflects the magazine's intended purpose to shape Soviet youth and engage them in the revolutionary struggle.

== History ==
Smena was founded in 1924 as an organ of the Central Committee of the Komsomol, intended to educate its young audience. It was part of a broader propaganda and literacy campaign. Its status as an illustrated magazine was essential, particularly since much of its intended audience was semi-literate. The inaugural issue laid out its program, of:

Revolutionary romanticism, novels, tales, stories and verse.

Travelogues, geographical, ethnographic, geological sketches, articles on questions of nature, engineering, social hygiene, the scientific organization of labor and others. A chronicle of scientific discoveries and technical advancements. Sketches on the history of the revolutionary movement in Russia and abroad, sketches on the history of the party and youth movement. Popular articles on questions of social science.

The magazine devotes particular attention to coverage of the lives of working youth.

The magazine's clear propagandistic function was accompanied by a need to appeal to readers to motivate them to engage with the magazine, so Smena and other such contemporary publications devoted a great deal of coverage to difficult social issues of the time. Contributors to the literary sections of the magazine in this period included Vladimir Mayakovsky, while the work of artists including Alexander Rodchenko also appeared in its pages. By the 1930s, the magazine was also a “litconsultancy” designed to publish and develop new Soviet writing following the model Maxim Gorky established at the magazine Literaturnaia ucheba. The majority of Smena was devoted to coverage of Party activities and meetings, industry, agriculture, new technologies and products, and the everyday lives of workers (and to a lesser degree, peasants) and the organization of labor. Smena also covered various aspects of the Red Army to demonstrate technological advancements and the training and achievements of recruits. A focus on literacy and agitation, with reflections on what Smena meant to readers, was also a theme that recurs throughout the 1920s and 1930s. Discussions and depictions of Lenin, his life, and the lessons to be drawn from his work, plus readers’ personal reflections on his role and inspiration in their lives, demonstrate the construction of his cult of personality and his central role in Soviet propaganda under Stalin, whose youth, life, and qualities were also held up as an example during his rule. By the 1930s, the kinds of frank discussions of thorny social questions which had been printed during the period of the New Economic Policy was no longer possible, and Party policy was rarely, if ever, openly criticized. Other figures who appear in the magazine include senior party officials and writers, with articles about Mayakovsky and his relationship with readers appearing more frequently than of any other writer in Smena throughout the 1930s and ‘40s. Gorky is also a key figure.

The theme of fizkul’tura - the Soviet campaign for physical education which also promoted group activities - first appears in issues in the late 1920s and continued to be a major theme during the 1930s and beyond. The fiction published in Smena also reflected the growing dominance of literary socialist realism, and both Paustovsky and Kataev's work appeared in this period. By the 1940s, Smena’s content had become focussed on the Great Patriotic War, like many publications in the Soviet Union and beyond. In a shift also of the magazine's aesthetic style, it adopted the moniker of “fortnightly journal of military-physical culture (voenno-fizkul’turnyi) of the Central Committee and MK VLKSM for Soviet youth." By August 1942 this has been shortened simply to “fortnightly military journal of the Central Committee and MK VLKSM” (voennyi zhurnal). In wartime, like many other publications, Smena published a great deal of coverage from the front and celebrated the bravery and heroism of young fighters, disseminated anti-Nazi propaganda, and galvanized their readership in the war effort, some articles specifically encouraging women to join up. Imagery of Stalin is less prominent in this period of the magazine, although unsurprisingly it remains unwavering in its support of his leadership. Towards the end of the war, the magazine alters its moniker again, to “literary-artistic and socio-political journal of the Central Committee of VLKSM”, and returns to printing a greater proportion of literary material and non-military coverage. The postwar period sees a more optimistic tone, alongside accounts of wartime heroism. There is a notable amount of sports coverage, and by the end of the 1940s, the sheet music and lyrics to songs celebrating different aspects of Soviet life become a fixture which persists throughout the 1950s.

Given the ubiquity of Stalin's image in Smena during his life, it is extremely notable that it all but disappears after the issue devoted to the announcement of his death. (Lenin's image and articles on Lenin, in contrast, continues to appear in Smena and on its cover for many years after). Even on the issue published around the anniversary of his death, only a photograph of Stalin is printed, with no accompanying articles. [№643, март 1954]. There is no mention of the second anniversary of his death. Throughout the ‘50s and ‘60s, Smena continues to publish content on party activism, industry, agriculture, and the lives of Soviet citizens, as well as travelogues and coverage of other countries and articles devoted to the legacies of 19th century Russian writers like Tolstoy and Chekhov alongside its contemporary poetry and prose. By the 1960s, contemporary issues predominate in the magazine, and propaganda surrounding the space race begins to appear frequently. Throughout the subsequent decades, Smena reflects changing political currents, and during perestroika it began to discuss themes such as rock music which had previously been forbidden.

In January 1990, Smena was reduced to a monthly publication schedule due to shortages, but pledged all the same to continue the long traditions of the magazine, in “activating public consciousness and the moral potential of the younger generation.” It became a privately owned publication in 1991.

In the twenty-first century, Smena has published the work of writers such as Svetlana Alexievich among many others.

=== Smena and debates on novyi byt ===
From its foundation in 1924 to the early 1930s, Smena engaged in a dialogue with its young readership, with editorials in the form of letters written by workers and students of the same age which invited responses, while depictions of exemplary Komsomol members and working youth served as models for life. In 1925, Nikolai Bukharin demanded a “cultural revolution” in the Komsomol press, which precipitated yet greater debate about the morality of Soviet youth. Much of the journalism and fiction in Smena addressed social problems affecting young people, including issues of novyi byt (the new form of everyday life), or questions of what it meant to be a good Soviet citizen under changing social norms and in the 1920s, many differing opinions were published in Smena on what novyi byt should look like, demonstrating the relative plurality of this controlled form of public debate during this period as norms in the new Soviet society were yet to be fully established.

The conditions of women's lives and their place in the Komsomol was a topic of frequent discussion in the magazine from 1924-7, as the mobilization of women in the workforce and attendant social changes had a profound impact on society in the early Soviet period. These discussions about women's lives frequently hinge on the central problem that the promises of the revolution had yet to be realized either in more equal sexual relationships between men and women, or – relatedly – in women's lack of access to childcare and the unequal division of domestic labor. The many opinions printed in Smena of how women should manage sexual relationships with men who had not embraced Soviet insistence on gender equality was the subject of a series of polemical articles which reveal the complex nature of the debate at the time. Abortion was legal in the Soviet Union until 1936, and in the early issues of Smena it was a theme of both fictional representations like Roza Melevich as well as other reporting. Readers’ responses to these articles reveal the wide range of views on this issue at the time.
