= Mudichur =

- neighbourhood
- Location near Chennai, TamilNadu
- Coordinates: 12.910203°N 80.071712°E
- Country: India
- State: Tamil Nadu
- Metro: Chennai

Government
  - Body: CMDA
- Time zone: UTC+5:30 (IST)
- PIN: 600048
- Telephone code: 044
- Vehicle registration: TN-11, TN-22
- Vidhan Sabha constituency: Tambaram

Mudichur is a residential locality in Tambaram Corporation Chennai in the Indian state of Tamil Nadu.
