= Selva (actor) =

Indian film actor

- Born: India
- Occupations: Actor, director
- Years active: 1991–1998; 2011–present
- Spouse: Lekha
- Children: 3
- Family: Rajasekhar (brother)

Selva is an Indian actor who has worked on Tamil-language films in leading and supporting roles. After appearing in several films as a lead actor in the 1990s, he made a comeback in two films directed by Mysskin in the 2010s.

== Family and early life ==
Selva was born in Lakshmipuram, Theni district of Tamil Nadu in a Telugu family to D. C Varadharajan, a retired police officer and Andal. His brother Rajasekhar, is also an actor who has appeared in Telugu language films. Selva grew up in Annanagar and attended Madras Christian College in Chetput.

== Career ==
Selva who pursued cinematography in film institute received acting opportunities. In 1991, he made his acting debut in the village drama Aatha Un Koyilile co-starring with Kasthuri and directed by Kasthuri Raja. The film completed a 100-day run at the box-office. He then acted in R. Umashankar's Thambi Oorukku Pudhusa. In 1992, he appeared in Manobala's Senbaga Thottam and in Kizhakku Veedhi. In 1993, he appeared in the double hero subject Maamiyar Veedu starring Saravanan, in Rakkayi Koyil and in his first city-based film Madurai Meenakshi. In the beginning of 1994, he acted in the village drama Sakthivel co-starring with Kanaka, the film was directed by K. S. Ravikumar and produced by AVM Productions. In mid-1994, he played the role of a student in the Telugu film Gangmaster, in which his brother Rajasekhar played the lead role. Then, he played the role of an angry young man in the village drama Maindhan; the critic Malini Mannath of The New Indian Express said: "Selva has acquitted himself quite well". In late 1994, he acted in Gangai Amaran's Atha Maga Rathiname. In 1995, he teamed up for the second with director R. Umashankar in Mannai Thottu Kumbidanum. In 1996, he acted as a folk dancer in the successful Nattupura Pattu, directed by Kasthuri Raja. He then appeared in Puthiya Parasakthi, co-starring Sukanya and Napoleon. In 1997, he acted in Rama Narayanan's Nattupura Nayagan. In 1998, he directed and acted in the comedy entertainer Golmaal. The film was declared as a below average venture at the box office and it became his final project before leaving the film industry.

After being away from the industry for almost 14 years, he worked as a dialogue writer for the Tamil dubbed versions of the Telugu films of his brother Rajasekhar. Director Mysskin called him to appear in a negative role in the crime thriller Yuddham Sei (2011), which marked his comeback. Mysskin then signed him on to work on his next film, the superhero film Mugamoodi (2012), portraying a Kung Fu master to Jiiva's character. In order to get ready for the film, he practised Kung Fu for six months under the supervision of the Mansuria Kung Fu teacher R. Shekhar, and read books on the martial art. The film, however, opened to negative reviews and became a box office disaster.

Later, he continued to play supporting roles in films such as Sivappu (2015), Eetti (2015) and Mo (2016). Then, Selva has scripted, directed and performed in the film 12-12-1950 (2017). He is part of the casting in the horror web series Live Telecast (2021) directed by Venkat Prabhu. Then, he appeared successively in actions thriller films Valimai (2022), Raid (2023) and Thanal (2025).

== Filmography ==
Actor

Year	Film	Role	Notes
1991	Aatha Un Koyilile	Marudhu	
1991	Thambi Oorukku Pudhusu	Selvam	
1992	Senbaga Thottam	Selva	
1992	Kizhakku Veedhi	Ponrasu	
1993	Rakkayi Koyil	Chinnarasu	
1993	Maamiyar Veedu	Parthasarathy	
1993	Madurai Meenakshi	Madurai	
1994	Sakthivel	Vignesh	
1994	Maindhan	Jeeva	
1994	Gangmaster	Balu	Telugu film
1994	Mappilai Thozhan		
1994	Atha Maga Rathiname	Muniyandi	
1995	Mannai Thottu Kumbidanum	Ramachandran	
1996	Nattupura Pattu	Kottaisamy	
1996	Puthiya Parasakthi	Chinnasamy	
1997	Nattupura Nayagan	Allimuthu	
1998	Golmaal	Ganesh	Also director
2011	Yuddham Sei	ACP Trisangu	
2012	Mugamoodi	Sifu Chandru	
2015	Sivappu	Politician	
2015	Eetti	DCP Rudrakumar	
2016	Mo	Vetri	
2017	12-12-1950	Selva	Also director
2021	Live Telecast	ACP Guru	Web series
2022	Valimai	Commissioner Vijayakumar IPS	
2023	Raid	Prabhakaran's father	
2025	Thanal	ADCP R. Thiruvalluvan	

Dubbing artist

Year	Film	Actor	Notes
1998	Velli Nilave	Srikanth	
