= Ettupatti Rasa =

- Poster
- Directed by: Kasthuri Raja
- Written by: Kasthuri Raja
- Produced by: V. Natarajan
- Starring: Napoleon; Khushbu; Urvashi
- Cinematography: Kichas
- Edited by: Ganesh Kumar
- Music by: Deva
- Production company: Pyramid Films International
- Release date: 14 February 1997
- Running time: 145 minutes
- Country: India
- Language: Tamil

Ettupatti Rasa (pronounced [eʈʈupaʈʈi ɾaːsaː] transl. King of eight villages) is a 1997 Indian Tamil-language drama film directed by Kasthuri Raja and produced by V. Natarajan. The film stars Napoleon, Khushbu and Urvashi. It was released on 14 February 1997.

== Plot ==
Singarasu (Napoleon), a brave and influential man, protects the eight villages living next to the canal. Palaniyamma (Urvashi) is crazy about Singarasu, but Singarasu prefers her soft and sensitive sister Pandiyamma (Khushbu). Singarasu finally marries Pandiyamma.

Marimuthu's (Manivannan) brother (Sukanraj) and Ponrasu's (Ponvannan) daughter (Abitha) are in love. Ponrasu, the village chief, is against their wedding. Singarasu accommodates the lovers in his house and promises to unite them, but the young lovers later commit suicide. So Marimuthu and Ponrasu decide to take revenge on Singarasu. Singarasu, busy in his duty, neglects his wife and is unable to understand her feelings. One day, Marimuthu tells lies about Singarasu to Pandiyamma, and she commits suicide. All the villagers think Singarasu is the killer. Palaniyamma decides to live with Singarasu and he develops a soft corner for her. When Singarasu decides to marry Palaniyamma, a woman explains to him what happened before his late wife's suicide. Pandiyamma was in fact killed by Ponrasu and Marimuthu. What transpires next forms the rest of the story.

== Cast ==
- Napoleon as Singarasu
- Khushbu as Pandiyamma
- Urvashi as Palaniyamma
- Ponvannan as Ponrasu
- Manivannan as Marimuthu
- Vinu Chakravarthy as Pandiyamma and Palaniyamma's father
- Charle as Mokkaiyan
- Abitha as Ponrasu's daughter
- Sukanraj as Marimuthu's brother
- Kumarimuthu
- Sempuli Jagan
- K. Rajeshkumar
- Manangatti Subramaniam
- Roopa Sree in a guest appearance
- Vichithra in a guest appearance
- Ram Lakshman (stunt choreographers) in climax scene

== Soundtrack ==
The music was composed by Deva, with lyrics written by Kasthuri Raja. "Panjumittai" was one of the famous songs from this film.

Song	Singer(s)	Duration
"Bemasena"	Deva	0:34
"Ettupatti Rasa"	Napoleon, Swarnalatha	3:31
"Karikalai Puttikittu"	Manivannan, Kalpana	2:26
"Kaathu Adikkidhu"	Malaysia Vasudevan, S. Janaki	5:06
"Lovapazham"	Manivannan	2:38
"Merku Seemaiyile"	Deva, Swarnalatha	5:21
"Panju Mittai"	Malaysia Vasudevan, S. Janaki	4:56

== Accolades ==
At the Tamil Nadu State Film Awards, Napoleon won the Special Prize for Best Actor.
