= Maamiyar Veedu =

- Poster
- Directed by: S. Ganesaraj
- Written by: S. Ganesaraj
- Produced by: T. N. Janakeramen
- Starring: Saravanan; Selva; Sithara; Nandhini
- Cinematography: Visvam Nataraj
- Edited by: Srinivas Krishna
- Music by: Ilaiyaraaja
- Production company: Karpaga Jothi Films
- Release date: 14 January 1993
- Running time: 120 minutes
- Country: India
- Language: Tamil

Maamiyar Veedu (transl. Mother-in-law's house) (Note: The term colloquially refers to prison.) is a 1993 Indian Tamil-language film written and directed by S. Ganesaraj. The film stars Saravanan, Selva, Sithara and Nandhini. It was released on 14 January 1993.

== Plot ==
Aravind and Parthasarathy alias Pacha are small-time crooks who don't have any relatives. They meet each other in jail, and the two soon become good friends. After their release from jail, Aravind doesn't know where to go, so Parthasarathy accommodates him at his home.

Both continue to steal. One day, they steal money from an old village man Korai Kaluthu Kuppusamy. The next day, the old man dies from a heart attack. Feeling guilty, Aravind tries to help the late Kuppusamy's family. Aravind decides to become a good man, but Parthasarathy does not want to change and strongly believe that the society will not accept it. Aravind gets married with Anandavalli, who was brought up in a prostitute house environment, but not a prostitute. Meanwhile, Parthasarathy falls in love with Kuppusamy's granddaughter Daisy. Parthasarathy then clashes with the dreaded don Kondaiah.

After he witnesses Daisy's father immolating himself for not paying back debts to Kondaiah. Pacha avenges his death by brutally slashing Kondaiah's leg. Inspector Vijay, corrupt, cat-eyed inspector who earlier arrested Aravind and Pacha decides to investigate the murder. He arrests Aravind and shoots him on the pretext of getting him released.

The cat-eyed inspector Vijay also arrests Anandavalli at a nearby departmental shop when she goes to purchase baby food. The inspector was in no mood to listen to her appeal that, the baby is alone at home and takes her to police station for further enquiry.

On next day morning, she is released from police station based on the recommendation of prostitution house head-lady, who is well known to Inspector Vijay.

When she heads to home, she is shocked to see that the baby is dead due to a day long hunger.

As Anandavalli is deeply saddened by Aravind's death while also losing her baby in the process. She murders Vijay and gets arrested with Pacha lamenting that police never lets criminals to lead a peaceful life.

== Cast ==
- Saravanan as Aravind
- Selva as Parthasarathy
- Sithara as Anandavalli
- Nandhini as Daisy
- Thalaivasal Vijay as Inspector Vijay
- Chitti as Kondaiah
- Kula Deivam V. R. Rajagopal as Korai Kaluthu Kuppusamy
- Veeraraghavan as Inspector General of Police
- Vennira Aadai Moorthy
- Charle
- Ponnambalam
- Kumarimuthu as Tiger Babu
- S. N. Parvathy
- C. R. Saraswathi
- Pasi Sathya
- Bhanu Prakash
- Ramanathan
- Vaithy
- Manager Cheena
- Krishnamoothy
- Prathan
- Kokila
- Nisha
- Vasuki
- Vasantha
- Manjuvaani

== Soundtrack ==
The soundtrack was composed by Ilaiyaraaja, with lyrics by Vaali.

Song	Singer(s)	Duration
"Ennai Thodarndhadhu"	K. J. Yesudas, S. Janaki	5:00
"Mamiyar Veedirukku"	Malaysia Vasudevan, Arunmozhi	3:58
"Nalla Samsaram"	S. P. Balasubrahmanyam, S. Janaki	5:08
"Oru Jann Vaithukku"	Malaysia Vasudevan, Arunmozhi	4:40
"Theriyamal Matti"	Mano, S. N. Surendar, Deepan Chakravarthy, Sunanda	5:06

== Reception ==
C. R. K. of Kalki wrote that a clear foundation, a series of events and dialogues that perfectly sits in its place.
