= Maindhan (1994 film) =

- Poster
- Directed by: Pugazhendhi
- Written by: Pugazhendhi; R. N. R. Manohar (dialogues)
- Produced by: K. N. Natarajan
- Starring: Selva; Nirosha
- Cinematography: Dharma
- Edited by: Srinivas; Krishna
- Music by: Deva
- Production company: Patteeshwarathal Films
- Release date: 1 July 1994
- Running time: 125 minutes
- Country: India
- Language: Tamil

Maindhan (transl. Son) is a 1994 Indian Tamil language action drama film directed by Pugazhendhi. The film stars Selva and Nirosha, with Napoleon, Kalyan Kumar, Pandiyan, Srikanth, Chandrasekhar, Nizhalgal Ravi, Prathapachandran, and Vadivelu playing supporting roles. It was released on 1 July 1994.

== Plot ==
Ramasamy Mudaliar is a village chief who follows Gandhian principles, while his son Jeeva is a jobless youth. Jeeva's Lakshmi is in love with him. Velayudam Pillai, a rich villager, plans to buy the village farmers' grounds and build a liquor factory there. Ramasamy Mudaliar tries to stop him and is subsequently killed. Jeeva becomes a responsible citizen and decides to take revenge on Velayudam Pillai.

== Cast ==
- Selva as Jeeva
- Nirosha as Lakshmi
- Napoleon as Velayudam Pillai
- Kalyan Kumar as Ramasamy Mudaliar, Jeeva's father
- Pandiyan as Inspector Vijay
- Srikanth as Ranjan
- Chandrasekhar as Thyagu
- Nizhalgal Ravi as Ponrasu
- Prathapachandran as DSP
- Vadivelu
- Kumarimuthu
- Chinni Jayanth
- K. S. G. Venkatesh
- Jayanthi
- Monica
- Swaminathan
- Swamikannu as Periyasaamy
- Arulmani as S. R. S.
- Haja Shareef
- M. R. K
- Mohankumar
- Hariprakash
- Aakash
- Chitraguptan

== Soundtrack ==
The music was composed by Deva, with lyrics written by Mu. Metha.

Song	Singer(s)	Duration
"Kaalam Nalla Kaalam"	S. P. Balasubrahmanyam	4:18
"Nandhavanam"	K. J. Yesudas	4:40
"Pogathe Ponmanai"	S. P. Balasubrahmanyam	4:00
"Sikkikicha Sikkikicha"	S. P. Balasubrahmanyam, K. S. Chithra	3:57
Thedathe En Kanne	K. S. Chithra	3:58

== Reception ==
Malini Mannath of The Indian Express said the film gave a sense of "déjà vu".
