= Nattupura Nayagan =

- Directed by: Rama Narayanan
- Screenplay by: Rama Narayanan
- Story by: Pugazhmani
- Produced by: Rama Subbiah; Karumari Kandaswamy; J. Durai
- Starring: Selva; Swathi; Timea
- Cinematography: Baby Philips
- Edited by: Babu Raj
- Music by: S. A. Rajkumar
- Production company: Karumari Movies
- Release date: 4 July 1997
- Running time: 120 minutes
- Country: India
- Language: Tamil

Nattupura Nayagan (transl. Folk Hero) is a 1997 Indian Tamil language drama film directed by Rama Narayanan. The film stars Selva, Swathi and newcomer Timea. It was released on 4 July 1997. A. L. Alagappan co-produced the film.

== Plot ==
Allimuthu is the lead performer of a Karakattam group based out of a village. Ranjani, who studied in London, returns to her village in India. She is a modern and arrogant girl, and the daughter of the rich landlord Pannaiyar. Despite having different upbringings and social status, Allimuthu and Ranjani both fall in love with each other.

Allimuthu then gets an opportunity to perform in Delhi, there he meets a Britain girl named Timea who is fond of Tamil culture. Upon his return, Allimuthu is accompanied by Timea. Allimuthu spends a lot of time with Timea and he avoids Ranjani each time she wanted to talk to him. Ranjani was deeply struck by Allimuthu's behaviours, and one day, Ranjani forces him to talk to her. Allimuthu reveals that he has never loved her, he then spits out blood and he faints. Timea tells Ranjani what really happened in Delhi.

In Delhi, Timea implored Allimuthu to teach her Karakattam and Allimuthu accepted it. In his hotel room, Allimuthu coughed up blood, Timea came in time to rescue him and transported him to the hospital. The doctor revealed to them that Allimuthu had blood cancer. Allimuthu decided to hide the truth from Ranjani and his family. He wanted Ranjani to hate him and therefore to forget him.

Afterwards, Ranjani summons a doctor from London to treat him from cancer. Allimuthu is then cured by cancer and Timea brings the couple together.

== Cast ==
- Selva as Allimuthu
- Swathi as Ranjani
- Timea as Timea
- R. Sundarrajan as Singaravelan (Allimuthu Father)
- Karai Subbayya as Nadaswaram player
- Manivannan
- M. N. Nambiar as Kuppusamy
- Vennira Aadai Moorthy
- Jai Ganesh as Pannaiyar (Ranjani Father)
- Saroja Devi as Radha (Ranjani Mother)
- Kovai Sarala as Pavalakkodi (Allimuthu Mother)
- Mano
- Kumarimuthu
- Jyothi Meena as Valli
- Periya Karuppu Thevar
- B. Ashokarajan
- Bonda Mani
- Marthandam
- Kullamani
- R. K. as Doctor

== Soundtrack ==
The film score and the soundtrack were composed by S. A. Rajkumar. The soundtrack, released in 1997, features 6 tracks with lyrics written by Gangai Amaran, R. Sundarrajan, Kasthuri Raja, Agathiyan, E. S. Moorthy and Rama Narayanan.

Song	Singer(s)	Duration
"Aanaiyidu"	Malaysia Vasudevan	4:11
"Aaruru Vidhiyile"	Yugendran, Devie Neithiyar	4:04
"Doo Doo Doobidoo"	Annupamaa	3:24
"Nethu Pudicha"	K. S. Chithra Suresh Peters	4:41
"Thevar Porandha"	T. L. Maharajan, Devie Neithiyar	4:06
"Vethala Vethala"	Mano, Swarnalatha	4:29
