= Madurai Meenakshi =

Madurai Meenakshi may refer to:

- Madurai Meenakshi temple
- Madurai Meenakshi (goddess)
- Madurai Meenakshi (film)
