= Mouna Mozhi =

- Poster
- Directed by: Kasthuri Raja
- Written by: Kasthuri Raja
- Produced by: Eknath
- Starring: Ramesh Aravind; Shali
- Cinematography: K. B. Ahamed
- Edited by: Lancy Mohan
- Music by: Deva
- Production company: Eknath Films
- Release date: 3 September 1992
- Country: India
- Language: Tamil

Mouna Mozhi (transl. Language of silence) is a 1992 Indian Tamil-language film written directed by Kasthuri Raja. The film stars Ramesh Aravind and Shali. It was released on 3 September 1992.

== Cast ==
- Ramesh Aravind as Chandru
- Shali as Kasthuri
- M. N. Nambiar
- Sethu Vinayagam
- Narasimhan
- Rajan
- K. B. Ahmed
- Sonia as Rukku
- Janaki
- Sriman as James
- Kasthuri Raja

== Production ==
Mouna Mozhi is the Tamil acting debut of Sriman. The director Kasthuri Raja also made his first major screen appearance as the antagonist, following a brief appearance in Aval Sumangalithan.

== Soundtrack ==
The music was composed by Deva, with lyrics by Kasthuri Raja.

Track listing
No.	Title	Singer(s)	Length
1.	"Kousalya"	S. P. Balasubrahmanyam	5:10
2.	"Kaasu Potaachu"	S. P. Balasubrahmanyam	4:30
3.	"Pennukku Inge"	S. Janaki	5:02
4.	"Poonguilea"	K. S. Chithra, S. P. Balasubrahmanyam	5:04
5.	"Pothi Vachcha"	K. S. Chithra, S. P. Balasubrahmanyam	4:49
6.	"Kaadhal Oru Veadham"	Mano, Swarnalatha	5:16
7.	"Thakkaali"	S. Janaki, S. P. Balasubrahmanyam	4:34
8.	"Ellam Enga Kasthuri"	K. S. Chithra	5:03
9.	"Beer Adichchu"	S. Janaki	4:42
10.	"Thanni Kudam"	K. S. Chithra, S. P. Balasubrahmanyam	4:39
Total length:			48:49

== Release and reception ==
Mouna Mozhi was released on 3 September 1992. Malini Mannath of The Indian Express criticised Kasthuri Raja's "insipid" screenplay, direction and said the two lead actors "skip through their roles". She also criticised the music, saying Deva "sacrificed quality for quantity".
