= Gol Mall =

- Title card
- Directed by: Selva
- Written by: Selva; S. N. Sakthivel (dialogues)
- Produced by: K. S. Ravikumar; C. Sudhakar
- Starring: Selva; Monica Nerukkar
- Cinematography: M. R. Hareekanth
- Edited by: B. Ramesh
- Music by: Bala Bharathi
- Production company: North East Pictures
- Release date: 5 June 1998
- Running time: 145 minutes
- Country: India
- Language: Tamil

Gol Mall (or Golmaal) is a 1998 Indian Tamil-language comedy film directed by actor Selva, making his directorial debut. The film stars Selva himself and newcomer Monica Nerukkar, with Rajan P. Dev, K. S. Ravikumar, Dhamu, Sathya Prakash, Mahanadi Shankar, Bhanu Prakash playing supporting roles. It was released on 5 June 1998.

== Plot ==
Ganesh, a good-for-nothing youth, falls in love with Aishwarya. Her father, Colonel Rajappa, is very strict and hates love. Ganesh and Aishwarya decide to elope but her father later has a heart attack and Aishwarya refuses to marry him. Colonel Rajappa's state of health deteriorates, therefore he arranges his daughter's wedding as soon as possible. Three terrorists escape from jail. While preparing Aishwarya's wedding in Colonel Rajappa's house, Ganesh enters in her room and tries to convince her. In the meantime, the three terrorists enter their house and begin to sequester them. These terrorists are ultimately Ganesh's friends and it was Ganesh's plan to marry his lover Aishwarya. What transpires later forms the crux of the story.

== Cast ==
- Selva as Ganesh
- Monica Nerukkar as Aishwarya
- Rajan P. Dev as Colonel Rajappa
- K. S. Ravikumar as ACP Bike Pandian (Periya Pandi) and Chinna Pandi
- Dhamu as Dhamu
- Satya Prakash as Ganesh's Friend
- Mahanadi Shankar as Bangaru
- Bhanu Prakash as Gautham
- Vennira Aadai Moorthy
- Delhi Ganesh as Muthukrishnan, Ganesh's father
- Thyagu as Viswanath
- Kumarimuthu as Dhamu's father
- Typist Gopu
- Pallavi as Aishwarya's sister-in-law
- Abitha as Reshma, Aishwarya's sister
- Sangeeta as Aishwarya's mother
- Sheela as Aishwarya's niece
- Rajasekhar as Home Minister
- Jenisha
- Chitti
- Baboos as Tyson
- Kalidoss
- Radhika in a guest appearance

== Production ==
Actor Selva turned director with this film, which would be his last before a hiatus. Monica Nerukkar, a Mumbai-based model best known for her work on the "Maggie Dosa" advert, made her debut as an actress in Tamil cinema with the project.

== Soundtrack ==
The music was composed by Bala Bharathi, with lyrics written by Arivumathi, Vasan and Thirumaran.

Song	Singer(s)	Duration
"Hey Paappa"	Suresh Peters	4:24
"Nee Pesum"	Hariharan, K. S. Chithra	4:22
"Twinkle Twinkle"	Anuradha Sriram	4:24
"Vaada Vaana"	Chandrabose	4:29

== Reception ==
Ji of Kalki praised the humour, climax and interesting ideas used for humour but criticised the use of double meaning dialogues and concluded saying this full-length decent comedy would have been widely appreciated if scissors had been used in significant places. D. S. Ramanujam of The Hindu wrote that Selva "webs a fairly interesting tale based on his own story and the surprise punches are cleverly effected to get over the issues he has created". Two years after release, the producers were given a ₹5 lakh (equivalent to ₹23 lakh or US$23,000 in 2026) subsidy by the Tamil Nadu government along with several other films.
