= Veeram Vilanja Mannu =

- Poster
- Directed by: Kasthuri Raja
- Written by: Kasthuri Raja
- Produced by: K. Muralidharan; V. Swaminathan; G. Venugopal
- Starring: Vijayakanth; Khushbu; Roja
- Cinematography: Rajarajan
- Edited by: Hari Palani
- Music by: Deva
- Production company: Lakshmi Movie Makers
- Release date: 19 October 1998
- Running time: 170 minutes
- Country: India
- Language: Tamil

Veeram Vilanja Mannu is a 1998 Indian Tamil-language action drama film written and directed by Kasthuri Raja, starring Vijayakanth, Roja and Khushbu. Manorama, Manivannan and Radharavi play other supporting roles, while Deva composed the music. The film was released on 19 October 1998, during Diwali.

Duraipandi (Vijayakanth) is an honest, hardworking lumberjack who lives with his mother Virumayi (Manorama) and village sweetheart (Roja). Duraipandi holds a singular, deep ambition in life: to fund the higher education of his beloved younger sister, Meenamma (Chandini), so she can become a prestigious District Collector. However, the village is under the tight grip of MLA Sundarapandi (Radharavi), a corrupt and greedy politician. Exploiting Duraipandi's desperation for his sister's fees, Sundarapandi tricks him into cutting down protected forest trees and smuggling illegal contraband. When the police ambush the operation, the MLA washes his hands of the crime, leaving Duraipandi to take the entire fall. Duraipandi is arrested and sentenced to prison, throwing his family into financial ruin and social disgrace. During these difficult times, Sevanamma (Khushbu) stands by the broken family and eventually marries Duraipandi to care for his aging mother. Years later, the narrative introduces DSP Vijay IPS (also played by Vijayakanth), a fierce and uncompromising police officer who is later revealed to be Duraipandi’s long-lost twin brother, separated from the family during their childhood. Posted to the same region, Vijay discovers the massive criminal empire run by MLA Sundarapandi. Realising the injustice inflicted upon his brother and family, Vijay systematically begins dismantling Sundarapandi's network from the side of the law. Following Duraipandi's release from prison, the two brothers unite. In a final showdown, they defeat Sundarapandi and expose his crimes to the entire village, successfully restoring their family's honour and reuniting their household.

== Cast ==
- Vijayakanth in dual role as
  - Duraipandi
  - DSP Vijay
- Khushbu as Sevanamma
- Roja as Village Girl
- Manorama as Virumayi
- Manivannan as Manikandan
- Radharavi as MLA Sundarapandi
- Senthil as Andiappan
- Vinu Chakravarthy as Muthu Karuppan
- Ponnambalam as Police inspector
- Major Sundarrajan as Commissioner of Police
- Chandini as Meenamma
- Mahanadi Shankar as a Police inspector

== Soundtrack ==
The music composed by Deva, with lyrics by Kasthuri Raja.

Song	Singers
"Koo Koo Kuyil"	Swarnalatha
"Pacha Marikozhundhu"	S. P. Balasubrahmanyam, Anuradha Sriram
"Aasaipattu"	S. P. Balasubrahmanyam, Swarnalatha
"Uthu Uthu Paakathinga"	P. Unnikrishnan, Swarnalatha
"Mayilu Mayilu"	Arunmozhi, Swarnalatha
"Enga Thaathan"	Malaysia Vasudevan, Krishnaraj, Swarnalatha

== Reception ==
A critic from Dinakaran noted "Kasturi Raja, though he has designed his song scenes in the usual folk culture style, has picturised the other scenes and human passions and sentiments in a remarkably, brilliant way". Ji of Kalki wrote this is a film that has come up with the ultimate goal of making the masses of fans tear up the mat in ecstasy. D. S. Ramanujam of The Hindu appreciated Vijayakanth's dual role performance, the cinematography and music, but felt Roja was wasted. The film won the Tamil Nadu State Film Award for Best Make-up Artist (Raju). The film was dubbed in Telugu as Adavi Puli in March 1999.
