= Mani Rathnam (film) =

1994 Tamil-language film by K. Jayabalan

- Theatrical release poster
- Directed by: K. Jayabalan
- Written by: K. Jayabalan
- Produced by: A. Suresh
- Starring: Napoleon; Anand Babu; Mohana; Chandni
- Cinematography: K. Hanumaan
- Edited by: M. Thirunavukarasu
- Music by: Sirpy
- Production company: Trax Creations
- Release date: 2 November 1994
- Running time: 135 minutes
- Country: India
- Language: Tamil

Mani Rathnam is a 1994 Indian Tamil-language drama film directed by K. Jayabalan. The film stars Napoleon, Anand Babu, Mohana and newcomer Chandini, with Vadivelu, Babloo Prithiveeraj, Jafar Azad and Vittal Prasad playing supporting roles. It was released on 2 November 1994. The film failed at the box office.

== Plot ==
Rathnam is a potter in his village and he is a short-tempered person. He has a sister Kavitha studying in the city. Rathnam finally marries his relative Thangamani who has been in love with Rathnam since her childhood.

Sivalingam is a wealthy and wicked man in his village, his son Nadarajan is mentally ill. Sivalingam wants absolutely to build a factory in the village. Sivalingam already bought all the lands he needed in his village, he needs only one land : Rathnam's land which is near the temple. Rathnam refuses : he does not want to see the village temple being demolished by Sivalingam. When Sivalingam sends his henchmen to demolish the temple, Rathnam intervenes and beats them all. In the meantime, Kavitha and Mani fall in love with each other in the city. Actually, Nadarajan is in love with Kavitha since school days and Sivalingam asks Thangamani to marry his mentally ill son to Kavitha but Thangamani rejects and insults him.

Later, Rathnam picked his sister up at the railway station, and at their return to home, they see Thangamani hanged. What transpires later forms the crux of the story.

== Cast ==
- Napoleon as Rathnam
- Anand Babu as Mani
- Mohana as Kavitha
- Chandini as Thangamani
- Vadivelu as Chappani/Chappani Samiyar
- Babloo Prithiveeraj as Nadarajan
- Jafar Azad as Sivalingam
- Vittal Prasad as Kanakku
- Loose Mohan
- K. K. Soundar as Thangam's father
- Raja as Raja
- Thillai Rajan
- Idichapuli Selvaraj as wine shop customer
- Vellai Subbaiah
- Karuppu Subbiah as wine shop customer
- Oru Viral Krishna Rao
- Kullamani
- Vichithra
- Anuja
- Thayir Vadai Desigan as Armstrong, wine shop customer
- Premi as Thangam's mother
- Pasi Sathya
- Ramya
- Kovai Senthil as conductor
- Mahendran
- Marthandan as Chinna Thambi
- Dhamu (uncredited role)
- Vaiyapuri (uncredited role)

== Soundtrack ==
The soundtrack was composed by Sirpy.

| Song | Singer(s) | Lyrics | Duration |
|---|---|---|---|
| "Adi Aatti" | Swarnalatha, Malgudi Subha | Thamizhmani | 4:31 |
| "Kadhal Illaathathu" | S. P. Balasubrahmanyam, K. S. Chithra | Vairamuthu | 4:40 |
| "Oh Rasa" | Malgudi Subha | Vairamuthu | 4:16 |
| "Dingu Dakka" | Mano, Vinoth | Ravi | 5:29 |
| "Neerodai Thaalampottu" | Arunmozhi, Sujatha | Neeraja | 4:30 |
| "Kuzhanthaikku Pasiyeduthal" | Arunmozhi, Sujatha | Vairamuthu | 5:03 |

== Critical reception ==
Malini Mannath of The Indian Express gave the film a positive review and called the film "fairly engaging".
