= Puthiya Parasakthi =

- Directed by: Gowri Rajan
- Screenplay by: Karunanidhi
- Story by: M. V. S. Haranatha Rao
- Produced by: A. G. Augustine
- Starring: Selva; Sukanya; Napoleon
- Cinematography: Baby Philips
- Edited by: Rajkeerthi
- Music by: Deva
- Production company: Anitha Films
- Release date: 22 March 1996
- Running time: 127 minutes
- Country: India
- Language: Tamil

Puthiya Parasakthi is a 1996 Indian Tamil-language film, directed by Gowri Rajan and written by M. Karunanidhi. The film stars Selva, Sukanya and Napoleon. It is a remake of Telugu film Yerra Mandaram. The film was not a success.

== Cast ==
- Selva as Chinnasamy
- Sukanya as Parasakthi
- Napoleon as Rajadurai
- S. S. Chandran
- Vagai Chandrasekhar
- Kumarimuthu

== Soundtrack ==
The music was composed by Deva.

No.	Title	Lyrics	Singer(s)	Length
1.	"Kizhakku Veluthu"	Piraisoodan	Mano, Swarnalatha	4:56
2.	"Aathoram Maligai"	Vairamuthu	K. S. Chithra, Malaysia Vasudevan	5:11
3.	"Paravaigalae"	Kalidasan	Sabesh	4:37
4.	"Manithargale"	Kanimozhi	Malaysia Vasudevan	4:23
5.	"Nalla Manam"	Chidambaranathan	Sabesh	4:41
