= Parivattam =

- Directed by: T. K. Rajendran
- Written by: T. K. Rajendran
- Starring: Jayaram; Sukanya
- Music by: Deva
- Production company: Iyyanar Cine Arts
- Release date: 28 September 1996
- Country: India
- Language: Tamil

Parivattam (transl. Turban) is a 1996 Indian Tamil language drama film written and directed by T. K. Rajendran who earlier directed Thalattu (1993). The film was produced by Iyyanar Cine Arts. The film stars Jayaram and Sukanya, while Goundamani and Senthil acted in supporting roles. Deva was the music composer. The film was released on 28 September 1996.

== Cast ==
- Jayaram as Muthu alias Pichaimuthu
- Sukanya as Mahalakshmi
- Manivannan as Rajamanickam Goundar
- Kovai Sarala as Deivanai
- Ilavarasu as Mailsamy
- Pandiyan as Pandi
- Goundamani as Kanthasamy
- Senthil
- S. N. Lakshmi as Kaveri
- Karai Subbayya as Veecharuva Subbayya Thevar
- Tiruppur Ramasamy as Edupudi

== Soundtrack ==
Soundtrack was composed by Deva and lyrics were by Vaali.

Song	Singers	Length
"Arasampatti"	Krishnaraj	05:15
"Chinna Moondrampirai"	P. Unnikrishnan	05:36
"Gundouru Gundumalli"	Krishnaraj, Swarnalatha	05:16
"Madurai Anthapakkam"	K. S. Chithra	05:00
"Paaya Potta Pankajavalli"	Swarnalatha	05:20
