= Nandhavana Theru =

- Theatrical release poster
- Directed by: R. V. Udayakumar
- Screenplay by: R. V. Udayakumar
- Story by: S.Velu
- Produced by: T. Siva; A. Selvaraj
- Starring: Karthik; Srinidhi
- Cinematography: R. Ganesh
- Edited by: B. S. Nagaraj
- Music by: Ilaiyaraaja
- Production company: Amma Creations
- Release date: 15 May 1995
- Running time: 145 minutes
- Country: India
- Language: Tamil

Nandhavana Theru (pronounced [n̪an̪ðaʋana teːru] transl. Chariot of the flower garden) is a 1995 Indian Tamil-language drama film, directed by R. V. Udayakumar and produced by T. Siva and A. Selvaraj. The film stars Karthik and newcomer Srinidhi. It was released on 15 May 1995 and did not do well at the box office.

== Plot ==
Srinivasan "Seenu" is an orphan and a full-time thief. He helps prisoners by solving their problems outside the prison. One day, he is intrigued by a prisoner's silence. Seenu asks him about his problem. The prisoner is Adhiseshan, the maternal uncle of Gayatri, a singer. He is a very rich man. He has been wrongfully convicted and sent to prison by Gayatri's paternal uncle Rajashekar and his son Gunasekaran. The duo have also managed poison Gayatri's mind against Adisheshan.

Adisheshan believes that Gayatri's life is great danger from the duo and requests Seenu to make her see the truth and save her. Seenu promises him that he will solve his problem. Initially, Gayatri avoids Seenu but she soon understands the true nature of Rajasekhar and she becomes Seenu's friend. Adhiseshan then realises that Seenu is his son (soon after looking at a photo of Seenu's mother). Seenu is thrilled about this as well and brings Gayatri to Adhiseshan's house to help them reunite. To their shock they find Adhiseshan dead.

It is then revealed that Rajashekar and Gunasekaran have borrowed a lot of money and defaulted. They are sent to jail for this. This also means that Gayathri has to leave her house. Seenu happily accommodates her in his house. Seenu then decides to mend his ways, give up thievery and earn money in the right way to help Gayatri realise her dream: to become a Carnatic music singer. He succeeds and she becomes a famous singer. She builds is also able to buy herself a new house. She then reveals to Seenu that she's in love with Suresh, a fan of hers. Suresh's father is not happy about his son intending to marrying Gayatri. He helps Rajasekhar get out of prison and gets him try and separate the couple before their marriage. Seenu manages to save them and the couple elope. In the end, Seenu marries a widow in order to keep a promise to his neighbour. Seenu takes care of the widow and her son.

== Cast ==
- Karthik as Srinivasan "Seenu"
- Srinidhi as Gayatri
- Anandaraj as Rajasekhar
- Devan as Adhiseshan
- Janagaraj as Albert
- Vivek as Beedi
- Vadivelu as Theekuchi
- Manorama as Seenu's neighbour
- LIC Narasimhan as a Catholic priest
- Gayathri as Seenu's neighbour
- Siva as Suresh
- Madhan Bob as a Music instrument seller

== Soundtrack ==
The soundtrack was composed by Ilaiyaraaja, with lyrics by the director Udayakumar.

Song	Singer(s)	Duration
"Adichu Pudichu"	S. N. Surendar, Mano	4:51
"Anniya Kaattu Annaney"	Srilekha, Mano, Swarnalatha	4:53
"Enna Varam Vendum"	Mano, S. N. Surendar, Arunmozhi, Srilekha, Sindhu	5:29
"Enthan Vaazhkaiyin"	Mano	5:19
"Ramanaa Sri"	Devie Neithiyar	2:10
"Unn Munnai Naanum Paada Vantha"	Arunmozhi	1:05
"Velli Nilave"	S. P. Balasubrahmanyam, S. N. Surendar, Arunmozhi, Uma Ramanan	5:10
"Viralil Suthi Meettavaa"	K. S. Chithra	3:34

== Release and reception ==
Nandhavana Theru was released on 11 May 1995. It was originally slated to be released in January 1995, during Pongal festival. K. Vijiyan of New Straits Times wrote, "Uthayakumar takes the movie nicely to just the interval. From then on, the story loses steam and we wonder where it is heading". Chrompettai Kavirayar of Kalki wrote there are around 300 films revolving around love triangle, this one too joins the list and concluded there are others to beat around the bush, but questioned why Udayakumar needs to do this. The film did not do well at the box office.
