= Nattupura Pattu =

1996 film by Kasthuri Raja

- Poster
- Directed by: Kasthuri Raja
- Written by: Kasthuri Raja
- Produced by: Vijayalakshmi Kasthuri Raja
- Starring: Sivakumar; Selva; Khushbu
- Cinematography: Kichas
- Edited by: L. Kesavan
- Music by: Ilaiyaraaja
- Production company: Kasthoori Manga Creations
- Release date: 9 February 1996
- Running time: 135 minutes
- Country: India
- Language: Tamil

Naattupura Paattu (transl. Folk song) is a 1996 Indian Tamil-language drama film written and directed by Kasthuri Raja. The film stars Sivakumar, Selva, and Khushbu, with Manorama, Goundamani, Senthil, Vinu Chakravarthy, Kumarimuthu, Prem, Anusha and Abhirami playing supporting roles. It was released on 9 February 1996.

== Plot ==
Parijatham was a famous folk dancer in her village and many rich landlords tried to woo her. Parijatham's mother Pattamma wanted a son-in-law who would let Parijatham dance after the marriage. She finally marries another folk dancer Palanisamy. Palanisamy's brother Kottaisamy was a young wastrel who spent his time with Kattamuthu. Later, Parijatham changed Kottaisamy into a responsible person. Kottaisamy married the folk dancer Mala. Rumours around Parijatham and the rich landlord Naicker became more intense. Palanisamy could not bear this rumour and split up with the pregnant Parijatham. One day, Kattamuthu's sister was raped by a rich landlord, she then committed suicide and Kottaisamy ridiculed the rapist in public. After this incident, the rapist joined forces with the other landlords, they prevented Kottaisamy from dancing for the village festival. So Kottaisamy and Mala struggled to survive, Mala eventually died during a dance show and Kottaisamy became a drunkard. In the meantime, Palanisamy brought up his baby son alone and Parijatham had to stop dancing.

Many years later, Palanisamy's son Velpandi falls in love with Amaravathi. Palanisamy finally apologises to his wife Parijatham while Kottaisamy decides to take revenge on his enemies. What transpires next forms the rest of the story.

== Cast ==
- Sivakumar as Palanisamy
- Selva as Kottaisamy
- Khushbu as Parijatham
- Manorama as Pattamma
- Goundamani as Kattamuthu
- Senthil as Chinna Karuppan
- Vinu Chakravarthy as Naicker
- G. Ramachandran as Landlord
- Kumarimuthu as Pattamma's father
- Prem as Velpandi
- Anusha as Amaravathi
- Abhirami as Mala
- Charle
- Jai Ganesh
- Shanmugasundaram
- Anwar Ali Khan as Minor
- Taj Khan
- Venkat
- Idichapuli Selvaraj
- Karuppu Subbiah
- Periya Karuppu Thevar
- John Babu as dancer in song "Otha Roova"

== Production ==
Kasthuri Raja revealed that when he first started the film he had no script except the title. The struggles of folk artists in Theni formed the basis for the script.

== Soundtrack ==
The soundtrack was composed by Ilaiyaraaja, with lyrics written by the director himself. The song "Otharoova" was well received and became a chartbuster. It was reused with alterations in the Tamil film Good Bad Ugly (2025), but later removed from that film due to legal action by Ilaiyaraaja.

Song	Singer(s)	Duration
"Oththa Roova"	Arunmozhi, Devie Neithiyar	1:57
"Aatharikkum"	K. S. Chithra	4:31
"Kezhukkaal"	Arunmozhi, Devie Neithiyar	5:01
"Kokki Vaichchen"	Mano, Devie Neithiyar	4:49
"Nattupura Pattu"	Manorama, K. S. Chithra	6:52
"Satti Potti"	Arunmozhi, Devie Neithiyar	2:31

== Critical reception ==
The Hindu wrote, "What starts to be a story on village folk tunes and arts slowly peters into fights and vendetta, the director Kasturiraja, too, not taking sufficient efforts to correct the narrative lapses in Kasturi Manga Creations, Naattupura Paattu".
