= Karai Subbayya =

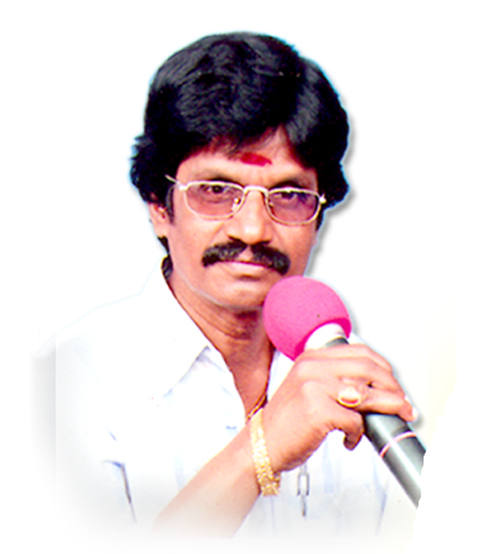
- Karai Subbayya
- Born: March 9, 1943 (age 83); Karaikal, Puducherry, India
- Died: September 19, 2026
- Other names: K. M. Subbayya, Subbayya Muthaiya Karai
- Occupations: Theatre artist; Dramatist; Scriptwriter; Musician; Stage performer
- Years active: 1960s–2026
- Awards: Kalaikavalar (1980); Kalaimamani (2004); Sangeet Natak Akademi Amrit Award (2023)

Karai Subbayya (9 March 1943- 19 September 2026), also known as K. M. Subbayya and Subbayya Muthaiya Karai, is an Indian theatre artist, dramatist, scriptwriter, musician, and stage performer from Karaikal, Puducherry. He has staged more than 100 plays, written more than 100 radio dramas for All India Radio, Puducherry, and performed in more than 10,000 stage concerts and performances over a career spanning more than six decades. He founded the Newtone Orchestra and became a significant influence on orchestra troupes across the Karaikal and Nagapattinam districts. He received the Kalaimamani award from the Government of Puducherry in 2004 and was conferred the Sangeet Natak Akademi Amrit Award in 2023 for his contribution to theatre music.

== Early life and education ==
Karai Subbayya was born on 9 March 1943 in Karaikal, now a district of the Union Territory of Puducherry. He received his early schooling at St. Mary's Higher Secondary School, Karaikal.

His first significant exposure to stage performance came during his school years. At a Scout campfire, students were required to perform a drama or demonstrate a skill. He performed a comic role and received sustained applause, an experience he later credited as the motivation that drew him toward theatre and the performing arts.

== Theatre ==
Subbayya began his involvement in theatre in his early adult life, writing, directing, and performing in plays across Karaikal, Puducherry, and Tamil Nadu. He staged more than 100 plays over the course of his career.

From approximately 1966, following the introduction of the Family Welfare Development Scheme in Puducherry, he wrote and staged social-awareness dramas in association with the Puducherry Medical Department. These productions were designed to communicate public-health and family-welfare messages to general audiences.

One of his most noted works is Theru Vilakku (Street Lamp). The play received the award for best script and dialogue at a theatre competition in Puducherry. It subsequently went on to win nine prizes at competitions across Puducherry and Tamil Nadu. As the practical difficulties of staging theatre increased, he began exploring light music and orchestral performance, eventually founding the Newtone Orchestra.

== Radio and social-awareness work ==
Subbayya holds the classification of 'A' Grade script writer with All India Radio, Puducherry. He wrote more than 100 radio dramas for All India Radio, Puducherry.

He was associated with a radio programme titled "Athu Athuthaan, Ithu Ithuthaan!" (அது அதுதான் இது இதுதான்), which dealt with old and new songs and received strong response among Karaikal radio audiences.

In 2008, a radio advertisement on AIDS awareness written by him for the Puducherry AIDS Control Society was broadcast on Suryan FM and won first prize in the Best Social Service Advertisement category in a national competition for Indian radio stations.

== Music and Newtone Orchestra ==
Alongside his theatre and radio work, Subbayya developed a parallel career as a musician and stage performer. He learned to play and arrange music for multiple classical and Western instruments, including harmonium, flute, tabla, keyboard, accordion, shehnai, saxophone, and nadaswaram.

He founded the Newtone Orchestra, through which he became active in the light-music and stage-concert circuit. The orchestra marked a significant stage in his artistic career, as his work expanded from theatre and radio drama into large-scale musical performances.

He performed in more than 10,000 stage concerts and performances over the course of his career. He is considered a significant influence on the formation and development of many orchestral troupes in the Karaikal and Nagapattinam districts.

== Influence on theatre artists ==
At Arignar Anna Government Arts and Science College, where Subbayya worked as a lower division clerk, he encountered A. Susairaj, who was employed there as a peon. Susairaj later described Subbayya as his guru, crediting him with giving opportunities to act and direct. Susairaj worked with him for close to ten years. As Subbayya moved increasingly toward orchestral and stage-music performances, he entrusted Susairaj with the responsibility of continuing to stage plays, including Theru Vilakku.

Susairaj subsequently founded Karai Kalaikavalar Kalai Kuzhu, a theatre group named in honour of his guru. Susairaj served as its founder and president, with Subbayya serving as its honorary president.

== Film career ==
Subbayya also worked in Tamil cinema, appearing in supporting acting roles and working as an assistant director. His documented acting credits include Nattupura Nayagan, Parivattam, Maruthani, Thangamani Rangamani, Pulivesham, and Manaivi Oru Manthiri. He also worked as assistant director on the film Maaruthi.

== Awards and recognition ==
Year	Award	Awarding body
1980	Kalaikavalar	Karaikal Music Academy
2004	Kalaimamani (Drama)	Government of Puducherry
2023	Sangeet Natak Akademi Amrit Award (Theatre Music)	Sangeet Natak Akademi
2024	Karaikal Ammaiyar Lifetime Achievement Award	Government of Puducherry

In 1980, he was recognised as Kalaikavalar by the Karaikal Music Academy.

The Government of Puducherry conferred the Kalaimamani award for drama on Subbayya on 15 September 2004.

The Sangeet Natak Akademi conferred on him the Amrit Award in 2023 for his contribution to theatre music. The award citation was issued under the name Subbayya Muthaiya Karai. The Lieutenant Governor of Puducherry extended congratulations to Puducherry artists who received Sangeet Natak Akademi awards in this recognition cycle.

In 2024, he received the Karaikal Ammaiyar Lifetime Achievement Award from the Government of Puducherry in recognition of his lifelong contribution to theatre and the performing arts.

== Filmography ==
=== As actor ===
- Nattupura Nayagan
- Parivattam
- Marudhaani
- Pulivesham
- Manaivi Oru Manthiri
- Thangamani Rangamani

=== As assistant director ===
- Maaruthi
