= Arunmozhi =

- Born: Napoleon Selvaraj; 8 December 1951 (age 74); Thirukandiswaram, Tiruvarur district, Tamil Nadu, India
- Occupations: Playback singer, flutist, lyricist
- Instruments: Voice, flute
- Years active: 1980 – current

Arunmozhi (Tamil: அருண்மொழி) (also called Napoleon Selvaraj) (born 1951) is an Indian playback singer and well-known flutist. He has sung songs composed by leading Indian film industry music directors, including Ilaiyaraaja, Shankar Ganesh, Deva, S. A. Rajkumar, Viji Manuel, Swararaj, Harris Jayaraj, Sirpy, Vidyasagar, Soundaryan, Karthik Raja, Siva, Masa, Dhina and Yuvan Shankar Raja. He has also performed in live concerts across the world. He is a part of Ilaiyaraaja's musical troupe, playing flute. Arunmozhi is very familiar with western musical notes, and used to interpret and explain those written by Ilaiyaraaja to other musicians in the group. Introduced by Ilaiyaraaja as a playback singer, Arunmozhi has sung some very popular hit songs.

== Early life ==
Arunmozhi was born in Thirukandiswaram village, near Nannilam in Tiruvarur district, Tamil Nadu. Arunmozhi, a self-taught musician, started playing flute at the age of nine, with a flute that was made by him. After completing his schooling, he was working as a supervisor in a pharmaceuticals company. His attempt to pursue higher education was disturbed when he lost his documents on the way to Chennai for admission. The events happened after that incident took him to the film industry.

== Career ==
=== Playing flute ===
After briefly working as flute musician in various amateur orchestras and clubs, Arunmozhi entered the film industry in the year 1980. Shankarsm, a Malayalam movie, was the first film in which Arunmozhi played the flute, and the music was composed by Shankar Ganesh. In the beginning, as a freelancer, Arunmozhi was playing flute for the songs composed by different south Indian music directors. While he was practicing flute in Prasad Studios, Chennai, in November 1984, a major breakthrough in his music career came. Ilaiyaraaja, who was also composing music in the same studio called Arunmozhi through his personal assistant after hearing his flute. Later Arunmozhi met Ilaiyaraaja, and got his first chance to play flute, along with other flutists, for the song "Vanthal Mahalakshmi" in the movie Uyarndha Ullam, which had Kamal Haasan, and Ambika in the lead role. After seeing his performance in this song, Ilaiyaraaja asked Arunmozhi to join his orchestra on a regular basis. Arunmozhi, then, joined Ilaiyaraaja's musical group in December 1984, after completing his commitments with other music directors. For playing flute, Arunmozhi is being considered as an important selection by Ilaiyaraaja. Meanwhile, he played flute for few popular songs including "Malaiyoram Veesum Kaathu" (Paadu Nilave) and "Pallaviye Charanam" (Oruvar Vaazhum Aalayam).

In December 1984, the song "Ore Murai Un Dharisanam" in the film En Jeevan Paduthu was the first song in which Arunmozhi, as Ilaiyaraaja's exclusive flutist, played the flute, though this movie was released few years later. The music was composed by Ilaiyaraaja as a flute-based song, and Arumnozhi has continued to play flute in Ilaiyaraaja's songs in the decades since, including in live concerts. Notable works with flute include "Ila Nenje Vaa" (Vanna Vanna Pookkal), "Thalattum Poongkaatru" (Gopura Vasalile), "Valaiosai gala gala" (Sathyaa), and all the songs in the 1991 drama Chinna Thambi.

=== Playback singing ===
Arunmozhi's debut in playback singing was for the song "Naan Enbathu Nee Allavo Deva Deva" in the film Soora Samhaaram, which had Kamal Haasan, and Nirosha in the lead role. Arunmozhi and K. S. Chithra sang this song. Ilaiyaraaja composed the music. During the recordings of this song, Vaali and Ilaiyaraaja changed his name to Arunmozhi. Ilaiyaraaja is the music director with whom Arunmozhi has rendered most of the songs in his career. Some of Arunmozhi's hit songs include "Punnaivana Poonguyil" (Sevvanthi), "Vaasakari Veppilaiye" (Sirayil Pootha Chinna Malar), "Vennilavukku Vaanatha" (Thalattu Padava), "Velli Kolusu mani" (Pongi Varum Kaveri), "Oththa Roova tharen" (Nattupura Pattu), "Engal Veetil Ella Naalum" (Vaanathaippola), and "Chalakku Chalakku" (Suryavamsam). Arunmozhi has sung in genres such as hymns and choral. He is one of the few singers with good diction in Tamil film music. Arunmozhi also became the staple voice for actor Parthiban.

=== Writing lyrics ===
Arunmozhi wrote all the songs for the film Enakkoru Magan Pirappan and one song for Arasiyal, with Karthik Raja and Vidyasagar composing the music for each film, respectively.

== Discography ==
=== Singer ===
According to popular online media musical sources, the discography of Arunmozhi includes,

Year	Film	Language	Songs	Music director	Co-singers
1988	Soora Samhaaram	Tamil	Naan Embathu Nee Allava	Ilaiyaraaja	K. S. Chithra
1988	Soora Samhaaram	Tamil	Neela Kuyile Solai Kuyile	Ilaiyaraaja	K. S. Chithra
1988	Manamagale Vaa	Tamil	Tell Me Tell Me	Ilaiyaraaja	
1989	Pongi Varum Kaveri	Tamil	Velli Kolusu Mani	Ilaiyaraaja	K. S. Chithra
1989	Pongi Varum Kaveri	Tamil	Dhinamum Sirichi Mayakki	Ilaiyaraaja	K. S. Chithra
1989	Thangamana Raasa	Tamil	Sokku Podi Vachirukken	Ilaiyaraaja	S. Janaki
1989	Kai Veesamma Kai Veesu	Tamil	Oru Jann Vaithukku	Ilaiyaraaja	S. Janaki
1989	Padicha Pulla	Tamil	Seemaiyellam	Ilaiyaraaja	
1990	En Uyir Thozhan	Tamil	Aeh Raasaaththi	Ilaiyaraaja	Malaysia Vasudevan
1990	Vellaiya Thevan	Tamil	Vaanaththil Irunthu	Ilaiyaraaja	Uma Ramanan
1990	Sirayil Pootha Chinna Malar	Tamil	Vaasakari Veppilaiye	Ilaiyaraaja	S. Janaki
1990	Kavithai Paadum Alaigal	Tamil	Unnai Kanamal Naan Ethu	Ilaiyaraaja	K. S. Chithra
1990	Thalattu Padava	Tamil	Odai Kuyil	Ilaiyaraaja	K. S. Chithra
1990	Thalattu Padava	Tamil	Neethana Neethana	Ilaiyaraaja	S. Janaki
1990	Thalattu Padava	Tamil	Varaathu Vantha	Ilaiyaraaja	S. Janaki
1990	Thalattu Padava	Tamil	Vennilavukku Vaanatha	Ilaiyaraaja	S. Janaki
1990	Pondatti Thevai	Tamil	Aararo Paada	Ilaiyaraaja	K. S. Chithra
1990	Pondatti Thevai	Tamil	Enathu Raagam	Ilaiyaraaja	S. Janaki
1990	Madurai Veeran Enga Saami	Tamil	Thangame	Ilaiyaraaja	Sunanda
1990	Maruthu Pandi	Tamil	Adhamum Yevalum	Ilaiyaraaja	S. Janaki
1990	Ethir Kaatru	Tamil	Raja Illa	Ilaiyaraaja	Uma Ramanan
1990	Keladi Kannmanii	Tamil	Enna Paduvathu	Ilaiyaraaja	Ilaiyaraaja, Saibaba
1990	Aarathi Edungadi	Tamil	Androru Naal	Shankar Ganesh	Sirkazhi G. Sivachidambaram, Swarnalatha
1990	Mallu Vetti Minor	Tamil	Manasukkulle	Ilaiyaraaja	S. Janaki
1991	Idhaya Vaasal	Tamil	En Manampol	Viji Manuel	Mano, Malaysia Vasudevan
1991	Eeramana Rojave	Tamil	Adichachu Lucky Prize	Ilaiyaraaja	Mano
1991	Thanthu Vitten Ennai	Tamil	Muthamma	Ilaiyaraaja	Uma Ramanan
1991	Thayamma	Tamil	Oru Muthu Kili	Ilaiyaraaja	Mano, S. N. Surendar
1991	Vetri Karangal	Tamil	Megha Veedhiyil	Ilaiyaraaja	Mano
1991	Ennarukil Nee Irunthal	Tamil	Oru Kanam Aagilum	Ilaiyaraaja	
1992	Thai Mozhi	Tamil	Thaai Illa Pillai	Ilaiyaraaja	
1992	Singaravelan	Tamil	O Ranga Sriranga	Ilaiyaraaja	S. P. Balasubrahmanyam, Saibaba
1992	Singaravelan	Tamil	Pottu Vaitha Kathal Thittam	Ilaiyaraaja	Kamal Haasan, Saibaba
1992	Thambi Pondatti	Tamil	Sonnaalu Vetkam	Ilaiyaraaja	
1992	Naangal	Tamil	Maanay Theney	Ilaiyaraaja	S. Janaki
1992	Idhu Namma Bhoomi	Tamil	Idhu Namma Bhoomi	Ilaiyaraaja	
1993	Maamiyar Veedu	Tamil	Mamiyar Veedirukku	Ilaiyaraaja	Malaysia Vasudevan
1993	Maamiyar Veedu	Tamil	Oru Jann Vaithukku	Ilaiyaraaja	Malaysia Vasudevan
1993	Aranmanai Kili	Tamil	Raathiriyil Paadum	Ilaiyaraaja	Minmini , Malaysia Vasudevan
1993	Ezhai Jaathi	Tamil	Atho Antha Nadhiyoram	Ilaiyaraaja	S. Janaki
1993	Dharma Seelan	Tamil	Thendral Varum	Ilaiyaraaja	Minmini
1993	Enga Thambi	Tamil	Ithu Maanodum	Ilaiyaraaja	Uma Ramanan
1993	Manikuyil	Tamil	Vetti Vetti Veru	Ilaiyaraaja	
1993	Manikuyil	Tamil	Kadhal Nilavey	Ilaiyaraaja	Uma Ramanan
1994	Sadhu	Tamil	Paddikirom	Ilaiyaraaja	Mano, Swarnalatha
1994	Vanaja Girija	Tamil	Thirumagal Unn	Ilaiyaraaja	
1994	Puthupatti Ponnuthaye	Tamil	Maankutti Nee Vadi	Ilaiyaraaja	K. S. Chithra
1994	Veetla Visheshanga	Tamil	Malarey Thendral	Ilaiyaraaja	S. Janaki
1994	Sakthivel	Tamil	Malliga Mottu	Ilaiyaraaja	Swarnalatha
1994	Veera	Tamil	Thirumagal	Ilaiyaraaja	
1994	Veera	Tamil	Aathula Annakili	Ilaiyaraaja	
1994	Mogamul	Tamil	Nenje Gurunaatharin Sevadi	Ilaiyaraaja	
1994	Mani Rathnam	Tamil	Neerodai Thaalampottu	Sirpy	Sujatha
1994	Mani Rathnam	Tamil	Kuzhanthaikku Pasiyeduthal	Sirpy	Sujatha
1994	Sevvanthi	Tamil	Punnaivana Poonguyil	Ilaiyaraaja	Swarnalatha
1995	Villadhi Villain	Tamil	Sarakku Sarakku	Vidyasagar	S. P. Sailaja, Suresh Peters
1995	Chithirai Thiruvizha	Tamil	Muthanai	Sharath Priyadev	Sindhu
1995	Periya Kudumbam	Tamil	Raththatha	Ilaiyaraaja	
1995	Pullakuttikaran	Tamil	Pothum Edutha	Deva	Uma Ramanan
1995	Pullakuttikaran	Tamil	Metti Metti	Deva	S. Janaki, Parthiban
1995	Murai Maman	Tamil	Yennachi Yennachi	Vidyasagar	Sirkazhi G. Sivachidambaram, Swarnalatha
1995	Raasaiyya	Tamil	Masathana	Ilaiyaraaja	Bhavatharini
1995	Raasaiyya	Tamil	Dindukallu	Ilaiyaraaja	Ilaiyaraaja, S. P. Balasubrahmanyam, Sindhu Devi
1995	Nandhavana Theru	Tamil	Unn Munnai Naanum Paada Vantha	Ilaiyaraaja	
1995	Nandhavana Theru	Tamil	Adichu Pudichu	Ilaiyaraaja	S. N. Surendar, Mano
1995	Nandhavana Theru	Tamil	Velli Nilave	Ilaiyaraaja	S. P. Balasubrahmanyam, S. N. Surendar, Uma Ramanan
1995	Oru Oorla Oru Rajakumari	Tamil	Vandhaal Vandhaal	Ilaiyaraaja	Mano, Devie Neithiyar
1995	Oru Oorla Oru Rajakumari	Tamil	Raja Rajathan	Ilaiyaraaja	S. Janaki, S. N. Surendar
1995	Ilaya Ragam	Tamil	Naan Ondru	Ilaiyaraaja	K. S. Chithra
1995	Ilaya Ragam	Tamil	Adi Mathalam	Ilaiyaraaja	
1995	Chandralekah	Tamil	Tharai Varamal	Ilaiyaraaja	Unni Krishnan, Geetha
1995	Chandralekah	Tamil	Arumbum Thalire	Ilaiyaraaja	Geetha
1995	Rajavin Parvaiyile	Tamil	Amman Kovil	Ilaiyaraaja	
1995	Rajavin Parvaiyile	Tamil	Kotunge Kotunge	Ilaiyaraaja	Mano
1995	Rajavin Parvaiyile	Tamil	Ival Yaaro	Ilaiyaraaja	S. Janaki
1995	Vishnu	Tamil	Singara Kannukku	Deva	K. S. Chithra
1995	Paattu Padava	Tamil	Iniya Gaanam	Ilaiyaraaja	S. P. Balasubrahmanyam, S. N. Surendar
1995	Mayabazar	Tamil	Naan Poranthathu	Ilaiyaraaja	Lekha, Devi Neithiyar, Ilaiyaraaja
1995	Kolangal	Tamil	Therke Veesum	Ilaiyaraaja	Lekha
1995	Muthu Kulikka Vaarieyala	Tamil	Chik Chik Chik	Soundaryan	S. Janaki
1996	Vasantha Vaasal	Tamil	Athipathi Azhagu	Masa (songs), Dhina (background score)	K. S. Chithra
1996	Vasantha Vaasal	Tamil	Puthu Roja	Masa (songs), Dhina (background score)	
1996	Nattupura Pattu	Tamil	Oththa Roova	Ilaiyaraaja	Devie Neithiyar
1996	Nattupura Pattu	Tamil	Satti Potti	Ilaiyaraaja	Devie Neithiyar
1996	Katta Panchayathu	Tamil	Mayavarathu	Ilaiyaraaja	
1996	Katta Panchayathu	Tamil	Vendina Veendum	Ilaiyaraaja	Devie Neithiyar
1996	Irattai Roja	Tamil	Pombalainka Kaiye	Ilaiyaraaja	Ilaiyaraaja
1996	Gulabi	Kannada	Madhura Naada	Ilaiyaraaja	Sowmya Rao
1997	Kadhalukku Mariyadhai	Tamil	Anandha Kuyilin2	Ilaiyaraaja	Bhavatharini
1997	Kadhalukku Mariyadhai	Tamil	Ayya Veedu	Ilaiyaraaja	Ilaiyaraaja
1997	Kadhalukku Mariyadhai	Tamil	Anandha Kuyilin	Ilaiyaraaja	S. N. Surendar, Deepika, K. S. Chithra, Malaysia Vasudevan
1997	Suryavamsam	Tamil	Chalakku Chalakku	S. A. Rajkumar	Sujatha
1997	Thenpandi Singam	Tamil	Vaarthai Ondru	Ilaiyaraaja	
1997	Thenpandi Singam	Tamil	Vilvovukkum	Ilaiyaraaja	
1997	Thambi Durai	Tamil	Kanyakumari Neeye	Ilaiyaraaja	
1997	Raman Abdullah	Tamil	En Veettu Jannal	Ilaiyaraaja	Bhavatharini
1997	Kadavul	Tamil	Poovarasan Poove	Ilaiyaraaja	Sujatha
1997	Porkkaalam	Tamil	Karuvella Kaatukkulae	Deva	Anuradha Sriram, Sujatha
1997	Bharathi Kannamma	Tamil	Thendralukku Theriyuma	Deva	K. S. Chithra
1997	Swarnamukhi	Tamil	Kammakkarai	Swararaj	Swarnalatha
1997	Vasuke	Tamil	Vamsathukku	Ilaiyaraaja	Mano, K. S. Chithra
1997	Oru Yathramozhi	Malayalam	Kakkalakkannamma	Ilaiyaraaja	S. P. Balasubrahmanyam, M G Sreekumar
1998	Elavamkodu Desam	Malayalam	Iniyente Kunjithathe	Vidyasagar	Sujatha
1998	Pagaivan	Tamil	Rajanea	Deva	Anuradha Sriram
1998	Nilaave Vaa	Tamil	Onnum Onnum	Vidyasagar	Swarnalatha
1998	Kanmani Oru Kavithai	Tamil	Raagam Azhaitha Geetham	Ilaiyaraaja	K. S. Chithra, Bombay Jayashri
1998	Kangalin Vaarthaigal	Tamil	Alli Sundhare	Ilaiyaraaja	
1998	Veera Thalattu	Tamil	Saanthu Pottu	Ilaiyaraaja	Swarnalatha
1998	Veeram Vilanja Mannu	Tamil	Mayilu Mayilu	Deva	Swarnalatha
1998	En Aasai Rasave	Tamil	Pathu Rooba Ravikka	Deva	K. S. Chithra
1998	Chinna Ramasamy Periya Ramasamy	Tamil	Vaazhaiyadi Vaazhaiyaa	Ilaiyaraaja	K. J. Yesudas
1998	Cheran Chozhan Pandian	Tamil	Kadhalicha Ponnu	Soundaryan	S. N. Surendar, Shahul Hameed
1998	Thalaimurai	Tamil	Vellimani Thottil Katta	Ilaiyaraaja	Ilaiyaraaja, Sujatha
1998	Thalaimurai	Tamil	Dapangkuthu	Ilaiyaraaja	Swarnalatha
1998	Simmarasi	Tamil	Kumbakonam Santhayile	S. A. Rajkumar	Sujatha
1998	Kalyana Galatta	Tamil	Velli Malai	Yuvan Shankar Raja	K. S. Chithra
1998	Kalyana Galatta	Tamil	Kummaalam	Yuvan Shankar Raja	Mano, Sujatha
1998	Kavalai Padathe Sagodhara	Tamil	Chinna Chinna	Ilaiyaraaja	Devi Neithiyar, Unni Krishnan, S. N. Surendar
1999	Poomagal Oorvalam	Tamil	Kannai Parikkira	Siva	Devi, Unni Krishnan, K. S. Chithra
1999	Annan	Tamil	Otha Roobavukku Oru	Ilaiyaraaja	Swarnalatha
1999	Annan	Tamil	Kutti Nalla Kutti	Ilaiyaraaja	
1999	Ullathai Killathe	Tamil	Nee Engey	Deva	
1999	Sethu	Tamil	Maalai En Vethanai	Ilaiyaraaja	Unni Krishnan, S. N. Surendar
1999	Sethu	Tamil	Sethuvukku Sethuvukku	Ilaiyaraaja	
1999	Sethu	Tamil	Sikaadha Sitrondru	Ilaiyaraaja	Unni Krishnan, S. N. Surendar
1999	Nee Varuvai Ena	Tamil	Poonguil Paattu Pidichirukka	S. A. Rajkumar	Harini
1999	Thodarum	Tamil	Naanthaan	Ilaiyaraaja	Gangai Amaran, Malaysia Vasudevan, Sunanda
1999	Kummi Paattu	Tamil	Samanja Pulla	Ilaiyaraaja	
1999	Kummi Paattu	Tamil	Uchi Veyilukku	Ilaiyaraaja	Swarnalatha
1999	Kummi Paattu	Tamil	Oorukku	Ilaiyaraaja	Swarnalatha
1999	Kummi Paattu	Tamil	Ammiyile Araichi	Ilaiyaraaja	Swarnalatha
1999	Kummi Paattu	Tamil	Aasai Machaa	Ilaiyaraaja	Swarnalatha
1999	Manaivikku Mariyadhai	Tamil	Aakka Poruthathu	Sirpy	K. S. Chithra
1999	Manaivikku Mariyadhai	Tamil	Elandapazham	Sirpy	Devi
1999	Rajasthan	Tamil	Jai Jawan	Ilaiyaraaja	T. L. Maharajan
2000	Vaanathaippola	Tamil	Engal Veetil Ella Naalum	S. A. Rajkumar	S. P. Balasubrahmanyam, Sujatha
2000	Thirunalveli	Tamil	Ini Naalum Thirunaal	Ilaiyaraaja	Swarnalatha, Ilaiyaraaja, S. N. Surendar, Manorama
2000	Thirunalveli	Tamil	Yele Azhagamma	Ilaiyaraaja	K. S. Chithra
2000	Karisakattu Poove	Tamil	Ethanai Manikku	Ilaiyaraaja	Anuradha Sriram
2000	Maayi	Tamil	Ola Ola	S. A. Rajkumar	Swarnalatha
2000	Kannukkul Nilavu	Tamil	Adida Melathai	Ilaiyaraaja	S. N. Surendar, S. P. Balasubrahmanyam
2001	Kanna Unnai Thedukiren	Tamil	Rasathi Rasathi	Ilaiyaraaja	Anuradha Sriram, Harini
2001	Friends	Tamil	Vaanam Perusuthan	Ilaiyaraaja	Vijay Yesudas, S. P. Balasubrahmanyam
2001	Vinnukum Mannukum	Tamil	Chembaruthi Poo	Sirpy	K. S. Chithra
2001	Dosth	Tamil	Ethen Thottathu	Deva	Swarnalatha
2002	Ivan	Tamil	Bhajanai Seivom	Ilaiyaraaja	
2002	Ivan	Tamil	Pattukku Pogathinga	Ilaiyaraaja	S. N. Surendar, Febi Mani

==== Background humming ====
Year	Film	Language	Songs	Music director	Co-singers
1993	Ezhai Jaadhi	Tamil	"Adho Andha Nadhiyoram"	Ilayaraja	S. Janaki
1997	Devathai	Tamil	"Naalthorum Endhan"	Ilayaraja	Ilayaraja, Kavitha Krishnamurthy
1998	Anuraga Kottaram	Malayalam	"Chirichente Manasilor"	Yesudas, chithra	

=== Lyricist ===
Year	Film	Songs	Music director
1996	Enakkoru Magan Pirappan	Aathu Mettulae	Karthik Raja
1996	Enakkoru Magan Pirappan	En Raasi	Karthik Raja
1996	Enakkoru Magan Pirappan	Chum Chum	Karthik Raja
1996	Enakkoru Magan Pirappan	Poocharamai	Karthik Raja
1996	Enakkoru Magan Pirappan	Enthan Manam	Karthik Raja
1997	Ullaasam	Valibam Vaazha Sollum	Karthik Raja
1997	Arasiyal	Vaa sakhi	Vidyasagar
1997	Adimai Changili	Ellora Ellora	Deva
