= Senbaga Thottam =

- Theatrical release poster
- Directed by: Manobala
- Written by: Balakumaran (dialogues)
- Screenplay by: Manobala
- Story by: Manobala
- Produced by: J. V. Rukmangadan
- Starring: Selva; Rohini
- Cinematography: S. Jayachandran
- Edited by: K. R. Gowrishankar
- Music by: Sirpy
- Production company: Leo International
- Release date: 28 February 1992
- Country: India
- Language: Tamil

Senbaga Thottam (transl. Garden of champak flowers; sometimes transliterated Shenbaga Thottam) is a 1992 Indian Tamil-language film directed and written by Manobala; Balakumaran is the author of the dialogues. The film stars Selva and Rohini, with Vinodhini, K. Prabhakaran, Vennira Aadai Moorthy, Senthil, Srividya and Gandhimathi in supporting roles. It revolves around a village youth who falls in love with a landlord's daughter. The film was released on 28 February 1992, and did not perform well at the box office.

== Plot ==
A village youth falls in love with a landlord's daughter.

== Cast ==
- Selva
- Rohini
- Vinodhini
- K. Prabhakaran
- Vennira Aadai Moorthy
- Senthil
- Srividya
- Gandhimathi
- Vijayachandrika
- Kokila
- S. Rajasekar

== Production ==
Soundar, the father-in-law of Lokesh Kanagaraj, served as an executive producer on the film. The dialogues were written by Balakumaran.

== Soundtrack ==
The music was composed by Sirpy, with lyrics by Kalidasan. It is Sirpy's debut film.

Track listing
No.	Title	Singer(s)	Length
1.	"Chinna Chinna Paavada"	Mano, K. S. Chithra	5:05
2.	"Kuthaala Aruviela"	Mano, Saibaba	3:46
3.	"Muthu Muthu Poomalai" (happy)	Swarnalatha	2:00
4.	"Thathalanga"	S. Janaki	3:57
5.	"Manja Pudikalaye"	S. Janaki	0:15
6.	"Paadum Paravaigalin Sangeetham"	S. Janaki	4:03
7.	"O Vennila"	K. J. Yesudas	5:20
8.	"Muthu Muthu Poomalai" (sad)	Mano, S. Janaki	4:45
9.	"Otha Nelavelaku"	Swarnalatha	0:45
Total length:			29:56

== Release and reception ==
Senbaga Thottam was released on 28 February 1992. C. R. K. of Kalki called it totally a director's film and added that Manobala has added vibrancy to a conventional village story with a poignant approach. He praised the acting of Selva, Gandhimathi and Senthil, in addition to Balakumaran's dialogues. Despite this, the film did not perform well at the box office.

== Home media ==
In Malaysia, the film was telecast on TV2 on 14 September 1996.
