= Kummi Paattu =

1999 film by Kasthuri Raja

- Poster
- Directed by: Kasthuri Raja
- Written by: Kasthuri Raja
- Produced by: Vijayalakshmi Kasthuriraja
- Starring: Prabhu; Devayani
- Cinematography: Rajarajan
- Edited by: Hari-Palani
- Music by: Ilaiyaraaja
- Production company: Kasthuri Manga Creations
- Release date: 21 May 1999
- Country: India
- Language: Tamil

Kummi Paattu is a 1999 Indian Tamil-language drama film written and directed by Kasthuri Raja. The film stars Prabhu and Devayani, with Sivakumar, Radhika and Urvashi in pivotal roles. It was released on 21 May 1999.

== Cast ==
- Prabhu as Kanagaraasu
- Devayani as Amaravathi
- Sivakumar as Dharmaraasu
- Radhika as Ramathaayi
- Urvashi as Kamatchi
- Ranjith as Selvarasu
- Manorama
- Vadivelu
- Anandaraj as Pachhamalayan
- Ponnambalam as Pachhamalayan's son
- Bobby as Pachhamalayan's son
- Vinu Chakravarthy as Amaravathi's father
- K. S. Jayalakshmi as Amaravathi's mother
- Sindhu as Pachhamalayan's wife
- Mannangatti Subramaniam as Sornamuthu
- Kavithasri in a special appearance
- Sharmili in a special appearance
- Alphonsa in a special appearance

== Soundtrack ==
Music was composed by Ilaiyaraaja.

Song	Singers	Lyrics
"Uchi Veyilukku"	Swarnalatha, Arunmozhi	Kasthuri Raja
"Oorukku"	Swarnalatha, Arunmozhi	Kasthuri Raja
"Ammiyile Araichi"	Swarnalatha, Arunmozhi	Kasthuri Raja
"Aasai Machaan"	Swarnalatha, Arunmozhi	Kasthuri Raja
"Aasai Machaan (Solo)"	Swarnalatha	Kasthuri Raja
"Adi Poonguyile"	Ilaiyaraaja	Kasthuri Raja
"Samanja Pulla"	Arunmozhi	Kasthuri Raja
"Chinna Manasu"	Bhavatharini	Kasthuri Raja
