= Sakthivel =

1994 film by K. S. Ravikumar

- Poster
- Directed by: K. S. Ravikumar
- Screenplay by: K. S. Ravikumar
- Story by: Murugan Kalai Gnanam
- Produced by: M. Saravanan; M. Balasubramanian
- Starring: Selva; Kanaka; Vijayakumar
- Cinematography: Ashok Rajan
- Edited by: K. Thanikachalam
- Music by: Ilaiyaraaja
- Production company: AVM Productions
- Release date: 14 April 1994
- Running time: 150 minutes
- Country: India
- Language: Tamil

Sakthivel is a 1994 Indian Tamil-language action drama film directed by K. S. Ravikumar. The film stars Selva, Kanaka and Vijayakumar. Produced by M. Saravanan and M. Balasubramanian of AVM Productions, it was released on 14 April 1994 coinciding with Tamil New Year.

== Plot ==
Sakthivel is an honest head constable and has a daughter, Lalli. One day, he beats a politician's son. He is subsequently promoted as a Sub-inspector but he is transferred to a ruthless village. A feud between Pannaiyar and Chairman divides the village in half and every day many villagers die.

== Cast ==
- Selva as Vignesh
- Kanaka as Lallitha
- Vijayakumar as Sakthivel
- Jai Ganesh as Pannaiyar
- Rajeev as Chairman
- Manjula Vijayakumar as Lakshmi, Sakthivel's wife
- K. S. Ravikumar as Sangili Murugan
- Premi as Pannaiyar's wife
- Sabitha Anand as Chairman's wife
- Y. G. Mahendran
- Charle
- Vasu Vikram
- Kumarimuthu
- Vimalraj
- Bayilvan Ranganathan
- Idichapuli Selvaraj
- Pandu
- Ashok Raja
- Chitraguptan as Kandha
- Purushothaman as Poosari
- Dakshayini

== Soundtrack ==
The soundtrack was composed by Ilaiyaraaja.

Song	Singer(s)	Lyrics	Duration
"Chinna Chinna"	Sunanda	Mu. Metha	4:33
"Idi Idikuthu"	Mano, K. S. Chithra	Vaali	4:54
"Malliga Mottu"	Arunmozhi, Swarnalatha	Kamakodiyan	5:06
"Paatti Sutta"	Mano, K. S. Chithra	Vaali	5:52
"Pambu Ena Vembu Ena"	K. S. Chithra	Vaali	5:10
"Poda Pakkoda"	Mano, Y. G. Mahendran, Charle	Vaali	4:49

== Reception ==
Malini Mannath of The Indian Express wrote, "Ravikumar has woven a tale that may not be all exciting but is nevertheless neatly told." K. Vijiyan of New Sunday Times gave a positive review, saying that the film had good elements "a good story, meaningful dialogue, humour, good acting and drama".
