= En Pondatti Nallava =

- Directed by: Senthilnathan
- Screenplay by: Senthilnathan
- Story by: S. Kala
- Produced by: S. Giri
- Starring: Napoleon; Khushbu
- Cinematography: Ramesh Viyas
- Edited by: J. Elango
- Music by: Deva
- Production company: Ramakrishna Movie Makers
- Release date: 24 April 1995
- Running time: 140 minutes
- Country: India
- Language: Tamil

En Pondatti Nallava (transl. My wife is kind) is a 1995 Indian Tamil-language drama film directed by Senthilnathan. The film stars Napoleon and Khushbu, with Senthil, Vadivelu, Janagaraj, Y. G. Mahendra, Kovai Sarala, Sathyapriya and Jayamala playing supporting roles. It was released on 24 April 1995.

== Plot ==
Radhika is an honest government employee and she is in charge of the food ration shop. She is then transferred to a remote village. In the village, everything goes well until the release from jail of the dreaded Rajappa who spent 5 years in jail. Rajappa is known to be a dangerous man who sold illicit arrack and raped the village girls. Half of the villagers flee the village and they settle down in the nearby village. The village police Inspector wants to send Rajappa back in jail.

Upon his arrival at the village, Rajappa rapes the poor Radhika. Much to his surprise, Radhika challenges him to change him as a good man. Later, Radhika becomes pregnant and gives birth to a baby girl. When Radhika names her daughter as Sivagami, Rajappa turns berserk (Sivagami was his mother's name). Radhika tells him his past and his mother's past.

When Rajappa was a school student, he was brainwashed by the illicit arrack seller Uthamarasa and he began to sell his illicit products. His mother Sivagami and his sister left him and started a new life in Sivakasi, his sister got married and had a girl : Radhika. Many years later, Rajappa's mother Sivagami and his niece Radhika came to see Rajappa during the village festival. His mother strongly believed that he had changed and became a good man. But Rajappa became a womaniser and a dreaded arrack seller. At the festival, he got into a fight with the local arrack merchants and killed them all. After seeing this, Sivagami died of heart attack in Radhika's hands. That day, Radhika decided to change Rajappa as a good man.

What transpires next forms the rest of the story.

== Cast ==
- Napoleon as Rajappa
- Khushbu as Radhika
- Senthil
- Vadivelu
- Janagaraj
- Y. G. Mahendra
- Kovai Sarala as Thulasi
- Sathyapriya as Sivagami
- Jayamala as Mayilu
- Arathi as Kuyilu
- Ajay Rathnam as Inspector
- K. S. Jayalakshmi
- Raviraj as Uthamarasa
- Mahanadi Shankar as Thulukanam
- Ashokan
- Shanmugasundaram as Ponnusamy
- King Kong
- Typist Gopu
- Vellai Subbaiah
- Kullamani
- Karuppu Subbiah
- Thideer Kannaiah
- Mahendran

== Soundtrack ==
The music was composed by Deva.

Song	Singer(s)	Lyrics	Duration
"Kathadicha Parakkuthadi"	Malaysia Vasudevan	Pulamaipithan	4:58
"Maari Manasu"	Swarnalatha	Muthulingam	4:42
"Ulukka Ulukka"	Malgudi Subha, Napoleon	Muthulingam	3:33
"Appan Enna"	S. Janaki	Pulamaipithan	3:07
"Ponnukulle"	Napoleon	Pulamaipithan	4:25
"Nethu Samanja Ponnu"	Malaysia Vasudevan	Muthulingam	4:44
"Kovai Kodi"	Tamilselvi, K. S. Chithra	Pulamaipithan	7:01

== Reception ==
Thulasi of Kalki wrote one of the immortal subjects of Tamil cinema is Mangamma Sabatham, and by mixing action, sentiments and other things together, you get En Pondatti Nallava, but it makes us sit at the edge of the seat with amazing screenplay.
