= Habeebi (film) =

2026 Indian Tamil-language film

- Theatrical release poster
- Directed by: Meera Kathiravan
- Written by: V. S. Mohamed Ameen
- Starring: Esha M; Kasthuri Raja; Malavika Manoj
- Cinematography: Mahesh Muthuswami
- Edited by: Mathi VS
- Music by: Sam C. S.
- Release date: 12 June 2026
- Running time: 133 minutes
- Country: India
- Language: Tamil

Habeebi (transl. Beloved) is a 2026 Indian Tamil-language romantic drama film directed by Meera Kathiravan and written by V. S. Mohamed Ameen. The film stars Esha M, Kasthuri Raja, and Malavika Manoj. The music was composed by Sam C. S., with cinematography by Mahesh Muthuswami and editing by Mathi VS. The film is set in a Tamil Muslim neighbourhood in southern Tamil Nadu and revolves around a young couple whose relationship creates divisions within their community. It was released in theatres on 12 June 2026.

== Plot ==
The story is based on a true story of a Kadayanallur Muslim community and their approaches with the brotherhood communities.

== Cast ==
- Esha M as Abuthahir
- Kasthuri Raja as Mohammad Yousuf
- Malavika Manoj as Nilofar
- Dhanasree Sudhakaran as Parveen
- Arulkumar
- Anusreya Rajan

== Production ==
Malavika Manoj was cast from over 300 girls who auditioned. Though the film's primary location is a Muslim house, it was shot in an agraharam.

== Soundtrack ==
The music was composed by Sam C. S. The first single "Vallonea Vallonea" was released in December 2024, and features deceased singer Nagore E. M. Hanifa's vocals recreated through artificial intelligence. The second single "Roohe Roohe" was released in May 2026.

Track listing
No.	Title	Length

== Release ==
Habeebi was initially scheduled for release on 28 May 2026. The film was subsequently released in theatres on 12 June 2026.

== Reception ==
Abhinav Subramanian of The Times of India rated the film 2.5 stars out of 5 and noted "Habeebi is sincere and often lovely to look at, and viewers who know this world from the inside may find plenty to hold on to. For everyone else, the goodwill is easier to admire than to feel." Narayani M of Cinema Express rated the film 2 stars out of 5 and said "Habeebi talks about everyone's journey to the Gulf, but despite all that travel, the film itself never quite arrives anywhere."
