= 12-12-1950 =

2017 Indian film by Selva

- Theatrical release poster
- Directed by: Selva
- Written by: Selva
- Starring: Selva; Ramesh Thilak; Adhavan; Ajai Prasad; Prashanth Kirubakaran
- Cinematography: Vishnu Shri K.
- Edited by: Dinesh Ponraj
- Music by: Adithyha - Soorya
- Production company: Jyostar Enterprises
- Release date: 8 December 2017
- Country: India
- Language: Tamil

12-12-1950 is a 2017 Indian Tamil language comedy drama film written and directed by Selva, who starred as the lead role in the film. The movie is a tribute to the film actor Rajinikanth, and the title of the film corresponds to his birthday (12 December 1950).

The cast, apart from starring Selva, includes Ramesh Thilak, Adhavan, Ajai Prasad, Prashanth, Ashwini Chandrasekhar, Thambi Ramaiah, Yogi Babu, John Vijay, and M. S. Bhaskar. Selva has rechristened himself as Kabali Selva. The film was theatrically released on 8 December 2017 to negative reviews.

== Plot ==
The movie follows the lives of five Rajinikanth fans.

== Cast ==
- Selva as Kabali Selva
- Ramesh Thilak as Muthu
- Adhavan as Ejamaan
- Ajai Prasad as Billa
- Prashanth Kirubakaran as Veera
- Ashwini Chandrasekhar as Kumudhavalli, Selva's wife
- Yogi Babu as Singam
- Thambi Ramaiah as Vanangamudi
- M. S. Bhaskar as Kumudhavalli's father
- John Vijay as John Vijay
- Elango Kumaravel as Jail Warden
- Ponnambalam as Police Inspector
- Swaminathan as Kunjithapatham
- Delhi Ganesh
- Shafi
- E. Ramdoss
- Risha as Sarasu
- Nandha Saravanan
- Cheran Raj

== Soundtrack ==
Music by Adithyha - Soorya.

- "Thedi Pudicha" - Nincy Vincent
- "Nadhi Therikuthe" - Pratap Prb
- "Thooya Megam" - Nincy Vincent

== Release ==
The film's title 12-12-1950 meant that the film didn't have any problems with title changes during release. Other films that depicted Rajinikanth faced issues as those films explicitly stated Rajinikanth's name such as Main Hoon Rajinikanth and Perumaan The Rajinikanth.

== Reception ==
Maalaimalar called the film "festive". Chennai Vision called the film's theme a positive and negative aspect.
