= Gangmaster (film) =

1994 Telugu film directed by B. Gopal

- Directed by: B. Gopal
- Written by: Mahesh Bhatt
- Produced by: T. Subbarami Reddy
- Starring: Rajasekhar; Nagma; Brahmanandam
- Cinematography: V. S. R. Swamy
- Edited by: Gautham Raju
- Music by: A. R. Rahman
- Production company: Maheswari Parameswari Films
- Distributed by: Maheswari Parameswari Films
- Release date: 15 July 1994
- Running time: 136 mins
- Country: India
- Language: Telugu

Gangmaster is a 1994 Indian Telugu-language film directed by B. Gopal. It has music composed by A. R. Rahman who signed the film because of his friendship with entrepreneur T. Subbarami Reddy, who was the producer of this film. It was dubbed into Tamil with the title Manitha Manitha. The film was a remake of Hindi film Sir.

== Cast ==
- Rajasekhar as Raja
- Vani Viswanath as Swapna
- Krishnam Raju as Purushottam
- Nagma as Sandhya
- Brahmanandam
- Selva as Balu
- Subhashri as Pooja
- Charan Raj as Chakravarthy
- Srihari
- Murali Mohan
- Babu Mohan
- Narra Venkateswara Rao

== Soundtrack ==
Gangmaster

Film score by A. R. Rahman
- Released: 1994
- Recorded: Panchathan Record Inn
- Genre: Film soundtrack
- Label: Sony Music India

A. R. Rahman chronology
Palnati Pourusham (1994)	Gangmaster (1994)	Bombay (film) (1995)

The score and soundtrack for the film were composed by A. R. Rahman with lyrics by Veturi. The Tamil version was titled Manitha Manitha and had lyrics by Vairamuthu. The song "Aa Siggu" was based on Rahman's own song "Raakozhi Rendum" from Uzhavan (1993).

=== Original version (Telugu) ===
No	Song	Artist(s)	Lyrics	Duration
1	"Nagumomu Nagma"	Mano, K. S. Chithra	Veturi Sundararama Murthy	05:20
2	"Misa Misalade Missandam"	K. S. Chithra, S. P. Balasubrahmanyam	Veturi Sundararama Murthy	04:47
3	"Hello Hello Premalekha"	K. S. Chithra, S. P. Balasubrahmanyam	Veturi Sundararama Murthy	04:59
4	"Baddaragiri Seethammaku"	Sujatha, Mano	Veturi Sundararama Murthy	02:05
5	"Kila Kilala Kokilala"	Minmini, Mano	Veturi Sundararama Murthy	04:11
6	"Aa Siggu Eggulenthavaraku"	Mano, Swarnalatha	Veturi Sundararama Murthy	04:41

=== Manitha Manitha (Tamil) ===
No	Song	Artist(s)	Lyrics	Duration
1	"Enna Mogam Kannamma"	Mano, K. S. Chithra	Vairamuthu	05:20
2	"Kisu Kisu Namakkul Kidaiyathu"	Mano, K. S. Chithra	Vairamuthu	04:47
3	"Hello Hello Anburani"	Mano, K. S. Chithra	Vairamuthu	04:59
4	"Innaal Oru Ponnaal"	Mano, Sujatha	Vairamuthu	02:05
5	"Kiliyerandu Konchikkolla"	Mano, Minmini	Vairamuthu	04:11
6	"Nee Etti Etti Thottuvechuko"	Mano, Swarnalatha	Vairamuthu	04:41
