= Thalattu Padava =

- Poster
- Directed by: R. Sundarrajan
- Written by: R. Sundarrajan
- Produced by: A. S. Ibrahim Rowther
- Starring: Parthiban; Rupini; Khushbu
- Cinematography: Rajarajan
- Edited by: B. Lenin; V. T. Vijayan
- Music by: Ilaiyaraaja
- Production company: Rowther Films
- Release date: 5 September 1990
- Running time: 145 minutes
- Country: India
- Language: Tamil

Thalattu Padava (transl. Shall I sing a lullaby?) is a 1990 Indian Tamil-language drama film directed by R. Sundarrajan and produced by A. S. Ibrahim Rowther. The film stars Parthiban, Rupini and Khushbu. It was released on 5 September 1990.

== Plot ==
Raja lives with his mother Thayamma and he is a graduate who works as a mechanic until he finds an appropriate job. He finally gets a job in Delhi. Unfortunately, Raja misses the train in a station and his certificates, because of Narmadha, a poor idli seller. Raja must wait 4 days for the next train. Slowly, Raja and Narmadha fall in love with each other. When he returns home, his mother Thayamma becomes mute. Raja works as the car driver of a rich man Kandhasamy and his granddaughter Narmadha teases him a lot. Until she knows that he is well educated, and she falls in love with him. What transpires later forms the crux of the story.

== Cast ==
- Parthiban as Raja
- Rupini as Narmadha
- Khushbu as Narmadha
- Sujatha as Thayamma, Raja's mother
- S. S. Chandran as Kandhasamy
- Senthil
- Jai Ganesh
- Rajyalakshmi
- Sudha
- K. R. Savithri
- MLA Thangaraj
- Balu Anand
- Super Subbarayan

== Soundtrack ==
The music was composed by Ilaiyaraaja. The songs "Odai Kuyil" and "Neethana Neethana" attained popularity. The latter song is set in the Carnatic raga Keeravani.

Song	Singer(s)	Duration	Lyricist
"Odai Kuyil"	Arunmozhi, K. S. Chithra	4:39	Gangai Amaran
"Neethana Neethana"	S. Janaki, Arunmozhi	4:31	Gangai Amaran
"Sontham Endru"	Ilaiyaraaja	5:03	Ilaiyaraaja
"Varaathu Vantha"	Arunmozhi, S. Janaki	4:51	Vaali
"Vennilavukku Vaanatha"	Arunmozhi, S. Janaki	4:34	Gangai Amaran
"Ammammamma"	S. Janaki	4:57	Gangai Amaran
