= Pongi Varum Kaveri =

- Directed by: T. K. Bose
- Written by: T. K. Bose
- Produced by: PL Palaniappan Chettiar
- Starring: Ramarajan; Gautami; Malaysia Vasudevan
- Cinematography: P. Ganesapandiyan
- Edited by: L. Kesavan
- Music by: Ilaiyaraaja
- Production company: Manorama Movies
- Release date: 17 March 1989
- Country: India
- Language: Tamil

Pongi Varum Kaveri (transl. The raging Kaveri) is a 1989 Indian Tamil-language film produced by Nemathanpatti P. L. Palaniappa Chettiar under the banner 'Manorama Movies' and directed by T. K. Bose, starring Ramarajan and Gautami. It was released on 17 March 1989.

== Plot ==
Six years after leaving the country, Raja— the wealthy heir to a sprawling empire- returns home. His estate manager, together with two subordinate workers, an accountant, and a cashier, has been embezzling money and diverting profits to themselves. While reviewing the accounts, Raja discovers that ₹25,000 (equivalent to ₹291,407 in 2026) has been misappropriated under the pretense of supporting a widow named Lakshmi after the death of her husband, Ravi. He demands a receipt showing the payment to her and warns the manager that, if the document proves fraudulent, he will fire the manager and the two aides. In an attempt to distract Raja, the manager organizes a party featuring liquor and an erotic dance, hoping to exploit any weakness.

Raja, however, remains a gentleman, slaps the dancer and walks out, thwarting the manager's scheme. The manager then tries to keep Raja isolated so he remains unaware of the ongoing plunder. When Raja uncovers the full extent of the embezzlement, he gives the trio a ten‑day ultimatum to make restitution. Determined to avoid punishment, the manager plots Raja's murder. They hire goons on horseback to ambush Raja while he is riding, intending to push him off a cliff and conceal his death even from his mother. The attack succeeds; Raja's mother is left devastated, and the manager suggests that they conceal the fact that Raja has gone missing to protect their business interests. Soon after, the manager and his two aides move to seize Raja's assets from his grieving mother.

Muthu, an illiterate look‑alike of Raja from Melur, shows up at the estate looking for work. He befriends Mesthri, the estate supervisor, and heads to the office for a job. The manager is stunned by Muthu's resemblance to Raja and hires him as a laborer, planning to later pass him off as Raja and use him to further their embezzlement scheme. After a series of comic mishaps with Kaveri, Mesthri's daughter, Muthu and Kaveri fall in love. Muthu notices Lakshmi, Mesthri's neighbor—a widowed mother with a toddler, Meena, who is struggling to survive after the death of her husband, Ravi. In the past, Ravi, an honest factory union leader, clashed with the corrupt manager over compensation for an injured employee. When Ravi demanded proper payment, the manager sent goons, but Ravi fought them off. Lakshmi begged Ravi to leave town for a quiet life, but he refused. The following day, news reached Lakshmi that Ravi had been electrocuted and had died.

At present, Lakshmi rushes around trying to get medicine for Meena's high fever, and Muthu intervenes, earning her gratitude. Over the next days, Muthu helps Lakshmi financially and grows close to Meena. Meanwhile, Raja's mother, convinced that her son is dead, decides to deed the estate to all the employees. The manager opposes this and secures a 30‑day extension, claiming they must wait for Raja's return before transferring the property to the workers. The manager pressures Muthu to pose as Raja in front of Raja's mother and the estate workers, hiding his own scheme to loot the property. Muthu initially refuses, but the manager threatens to frame him with false charges, so Muthu reluctantly agrees, believing he is doing something noble.

Just before Raja's mother is about to distribute the estate, Muthu, disguised as Raja, appears and surprises her. In his "Raja" role, he enters the factory and begins correcting the wage records that had been embezzled by Nattu, one of the manager's aides. He appoints Lakshmi as his personal secretary, which infuriates the manager. Kaveri starts missing Muthu, but Raja reveals to her that he is only pretending to be Muthu to expose the manager's fraud. Raja puts a stop to the illegal smuggling operations run by the manager's aides, drawing their wrath. In retaliation, they kidnap Raja; Lakshmi overhears a conversation in which the manager admits that he and his men staged Ravi's murder as an electrical accident. At a public gathering, Raja announces new welfare schemes and bonuses for all the laborers, further angering the manager. The manager demands that he get Raja's mother to sign over the estate's documents.

The following morning, the manager and his henchmen corner Raja, finally realizing that he had been posing as Muthu all along. Raja then discloses that he and his friend Ashok, a police officer, had anticipated the manager's plot and had escaped earlier. With the truth out, the manager blackmails Raja by taking his mother, Kaveri, and the toddler Meena hostage. Raja manages to escape, and a horseback chase ensues. The manager, holding Raja's mother at gunpoint, forces her to sign the property documents. While Raja battles the goons, Lakshmi arrives clutching a cassette tape that contains the manager's recorded confession of his crimes and demands the release of the hostages. The manager shoots Lakshmi, but she returns fire, killing him and his two accomplices—the very men responsible for her husband Ravi's murder.

Dying, Lakshmi entrusts her daughter Meena to Raja and Kaveri before she passes away. Finally, a police team led by Ashok arrives and arrests the others involved.

== Cast ==
- Ramarajan as Raja / Muthu
- Gautami as Kaveri
- S. S. Chandran as Kaliyappan
- Malaysia Vasudevan as a corrupt Manager
- Vinu Chakravarthy as Mesthri, factory supervisor
- K. Natraj as Nattu, the corrupt Manager's aide
- Krishnamoorthy as the corrupt Manager's aide
- Sripriya as Lakshmi
- Disco Shanti as a dancer in the song "Kattililla"
- Dubbing Janaki as Raja's mother
- Kovai Sarala as Kaliyappan's wife
- Vijayachandrika as Sakunthalai, Kaliyappan's fake sister-in-law
- Chinni Jayanth as Kasi, Muthu's friend
- Kumarimuthu as Kaliyappan's fake brother
- Omakuchi Narasimhan as Kaliyappan's father-in-law
- Baby Sudha as Meena
- Radha Ravi in a special appearance as Ravi
- G. M. Sundar as Ashok, Raja's friend (uncredited role)

== Soundtrack ==
The soundtrack was composed by Ilaiyaraaja. In particular, the song "Velli Kolusu" was a big hit.

Song	Singers	Lyrics
"Velli Kolusu"	Arunmozhi, K. S. Chithra	Gangai Amaran
"Dhinamum Sirichi"	Arunmozhi, K. S. Chithra	Gangai Amaran
"Kattililla"	S. P. Sailaja	Gangai Amaran
"Indha Rasave"	Ilaiyaraaja	Piraisoodan
"Mannavar Paadum"	P. Susheela, Ilaiyaraaja	Piraisoodan
