= Napoleon (actor) =

American-Indian actor, entrepreneur and former Indian politician (born 1963)

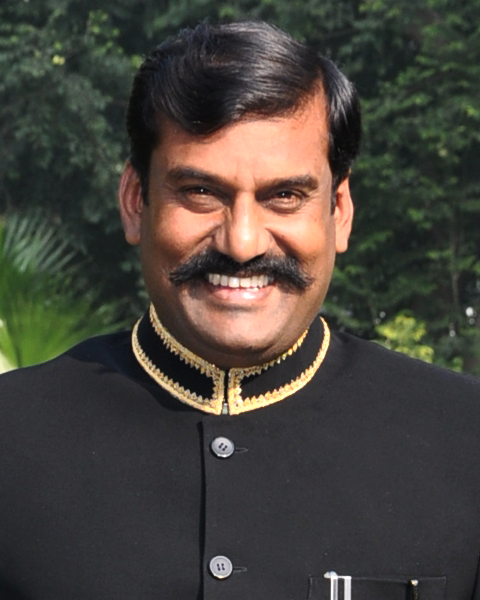
- Born: Kumaresan Duraisamy; 2 December 1963 (age 62); Tiruchirappalli, Madras State (now Tamil Nadu), India
- Education: St. Joseph's College, Trichy
- Occupations: Actor; Politician; Entrepreneur
- Years active: 1991–present
- Spouse: Jayasudha (m. 1993)
- Children: 2

Minister of State for Social Justice and Empowerment Government of India
- In office 28 May 2009 – 20 March 2013 Serving with Balram Naik (from 28 October 2012 to 20 March 2013)
- Minister: Mukul Wasnik (31 May 2009 – 27 October 2012); Selja Kumari (27 October 2012 – 20 March 2013)
- Preceded by: Subbulakshmi Jagadeesan
- Succeeded by: Manikrao Hodlya Gavit

Member of Parliament, Lok Sabha
- In office 16 May 2009 – 16 May 2014
- Preceded by: A. Raja
- Succeeded by: R. P. Marutharajaa
- Constituency: Perambalur

Member of Tamil Nadu Legislative Assembly
- In office 14 May 2001 – 12 May 2006
- Preceded by: J. M. Aaron Rashid
- Succeeded by: B. Ranganathan
- Constituency: Villivakkam

Personal details
- Party: Dravida Munnetra Kazhagam (1980-2014)
- Other political affiliations: Bharatiya Janata Party (2014)

Kumaresan Duraisamy (born 2 December 1963), known professionally by his stage name Napoleon, is an Indian actor, entrepreneur and former politician. He was the Minister of State for Social Justice and Empowerment in Indian Prime Minister Manmohan Singh's cabinet. He has acted predominantly in Tamil films apart from some Telugu, Malayalam, Kannada and English movies.

== Early and personal life ==
Napoleon was born as Kumaresan Duraisamy on 2 December 1963 in Tiruchirappali in a Telugu family long-settled in Tamil Nadu. He graduated from St. Joseph's College, Trichy.

In 1993, he married Jayasudha and had two sons: Dhanoosh and Gunal. Dhanoosh was diagnosed with muscular dystrophy, which eventually prompted Napoleon and his family to move to America. Gunal directed the music video for the local LA-based band affengriffon's "I Just Wanna See You".

== Career ==
=== Politics ===
Napoleon became enthused by the ideologies of the Dravida Munnetra Kazhagam (DMK) party. He joined the party in which his uncle K. N. Nehru was already a member and at that time the Public Welfare Minister of the state government.

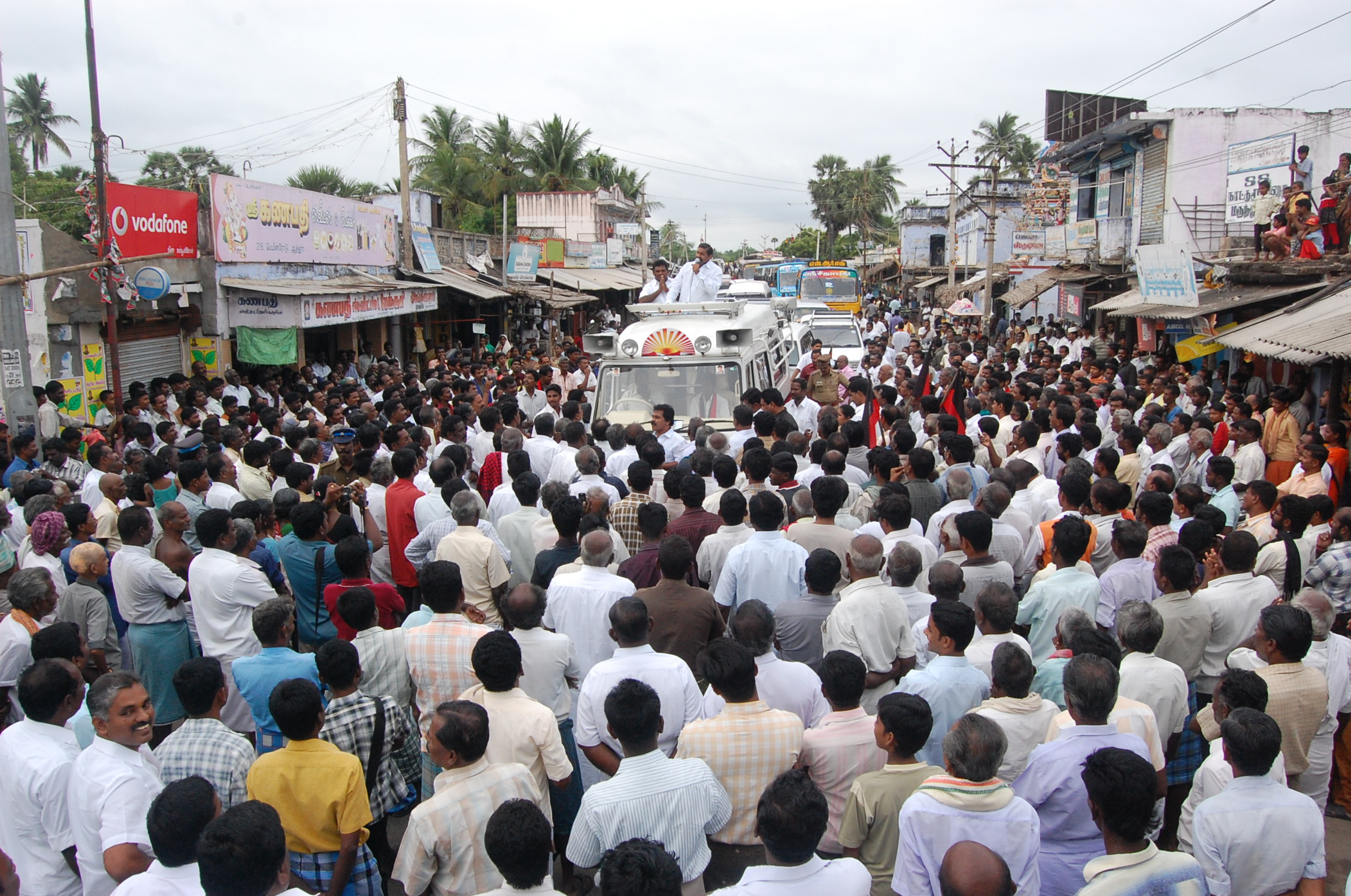
2009 Indian general election campaign

Napoleon contested the State Assembly elections of 2001, winning the Villivakkam constituency contest and thereby becoming a Member of the Legislative Assembly of Tamil Nadu. He lost his membership in the 2006 elections, when he contested from the Mylapore constituency and was defeated by actor S. Ve. Shekhar. Subsequently, Napoleon nurtured the Perambalur constituency in the hope of becoming a member of parliament for the DMK and succeeded in the 2009 Lok Sabha election. He was then appointed Minister of State for Social Justice and Empowerment in Union government. Seen as a loyalist of Azhagiri, he was sidelined by DMK after the expulsion of the latter from the party in 2014. He joined the BJP in the presence of party President Amit Shah on 21 December 2014. He was made the party's state vice-president on 26 November 2015.

=== Films ===
He entered the Tamil film industry in 1991 with Bharathiraja's rural film Pudhu Nellu Pudhu Naathu, playing the antagonist role. After the success of Ejamaan (1993), Napoleon went on to play the villain to great effect in Malayalam and Telugu cinema too. He has been praised for his performance and acting in the Malayalam movie Devasuram (1993). Napoleon turned hero on-screen too with Kizhakku Cheemayile (1993) in which he played an anti-hero. After that film, Pratap Pothen gave Seevalaperi Pandi (1994). That film turned out to be a hit. He was awarded Tamil Nadu State Film Award Special Prize for his performance in Ettupatti Rasa (1997).

In 1998, he was awarded the Kalaimamani and MGR Award. From 2000 to 2006, he was appointed as the vice-president of the South Indian Film Artistes Association.

Later after years into film industry, he also got the chance to work as a supporting actor in popular movies such as Pokkiri (2007) and Dasavathaaram (2008).

Though he settled in Nashville, Tennessee, United States of America, at the insistence of the industry stalwarts, he made his acting comeback with Kidaari (2016). He then went on to portray Gautham Karthik's father in Muthuramalingam (2017) replacing Karthik.

After making his Hollywood debut in the supernatural thriller, Devil's Night: Dawn of the Nain Rouge (2019), he was seen in another American independent film titled Christmas Coupon (2019). Napoleon also announced that he is the only Tamil actor, who had acted in a Hollywood film, which was completely shot in the US.

=== Entrepreneurship ===
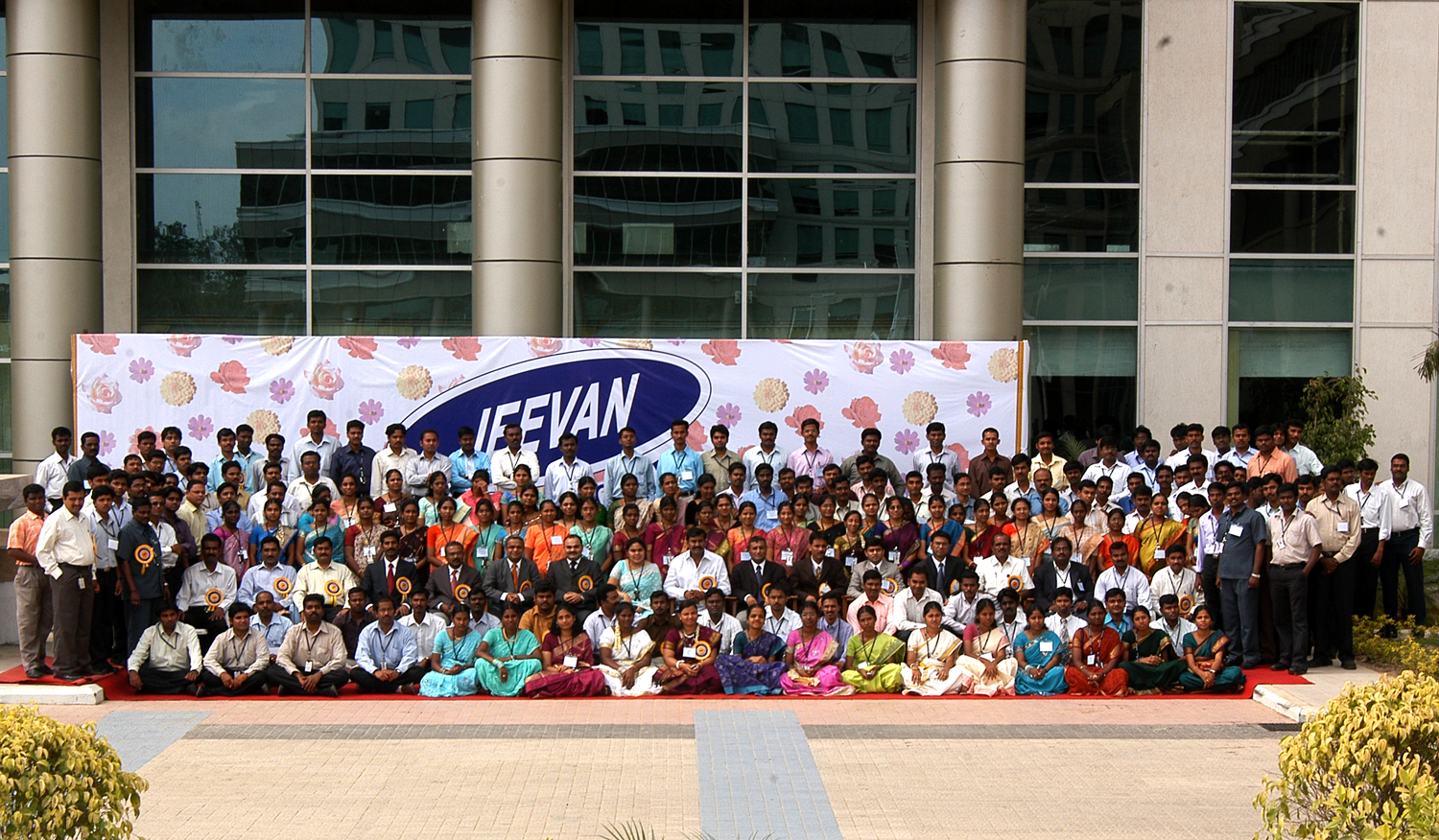
Jeevan Technologies 2008

Nepoleon Duraisamy forayed into IT Entrepreneurship and kick started "Jeevan Technologies" IT operations in Chennai, India in the year 2000.

=== Social entrepreneurship ===
In 2010, Napoleon established Myopathy Unit of Jeevan Foundation, the Institute for Muscular Dystrophy & Research Center. It is a non-profit organization registered under the Tamil Nadu Trust Act.

== Achievements and awards ==
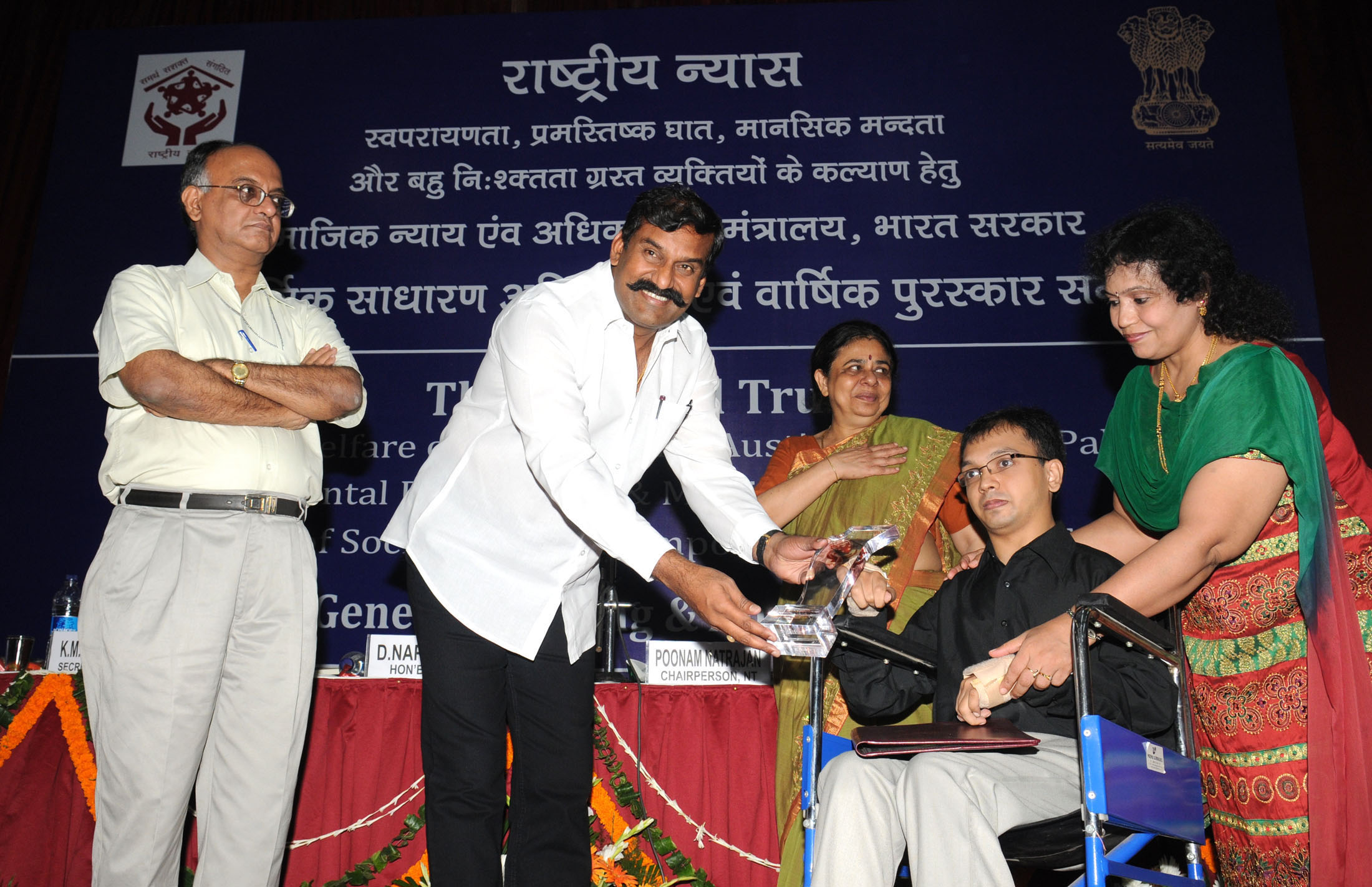
Napoleon presenting the National Trust Annual Award to Shri Ashwin Karthik from Bangalore, at the National Trust Annual Awards Function, in New Delhi on September 10, 2010.

- Tamil Nadu State Film Award Special Prize for Ettupatti Rasa (1997)
- Kalaimamani and MGR Award (1998)
- Vice-president of the South Indian Film Artistes' Association (2000–2006)
- Murasoli Trust "Kalaignar" Award, which is given to people who contribute to Tamil language, literature and culture (2007).

== Filmography ==
=== Tamil films ===
Year	Film	Role	Notes
1991	Pudhu Nellu Pudhu Naathu	Shankaralingam	
1991	MGR Nagaril	John Peter	
1992	Chinna Thayee	Chamundi	
1992	Bharathan	C.I.D. Johnson	
1992	Nadodi Thendral	Swamikannu	
1992	Oor Mariyadhai	Veerapandi	
1992	Idhu Namma Bhoomi	Mirasudar	
1992	Mudhal Seethanam	Devi Meenakshi's uncle	
1992	Thalaivasal	Chandran	
1992	Pangali		
1992	Abhirami	Mr. Dhilip Kumar	Guest appearance
1993	Captain Magal	Robert Royappa	
1993	Pudhu Piravi		
1993	Yejaman	Vallavarayan	
1993	Minmini Poochigal	Victor	
1993	Munarivippu	Ranjith	
1993	Rajadhi Raja Raja Kulothunga Raja Marthanda Raja Gambeera Kathavaraya Krishna Kamarajan	Guru Subramaniam	
1993	Nallathe Nadakkum	Vikraman	
1993	Dharma Seelan	Omer Sheriff	
1993	Maravan	Shankarapandiyan	
1993	Periyamma		
1993	Enga Muthalali	Jayaraman	
1993	Kizhakku Cheemayile	Shivanadi	Cinema Express Award for Best Villain
1994	Seevalaperi Pandi	Pandi	Debut as Hero
1994	Maindhan	Velayudam Pillai	
1994	Pudhupatti Ponnuthayi		
1994	Thozhar Pandian	Thaamaraiselvan	
1994	Thamarai	Thamarai	
1994	Mani Rathnam	Rathnam	
1994	Vanaja Girija	Anand	
1995	Rajamuthirai	Markandeyan	
1995	Muthu Kaalai	Sakthivel	
1995	Chinna Mani	Duraisamy Thevar	
1995	En Pondatti Nallava	Rajappa	
1995	Thamizhachi	Rasayya	
1995	Asuran	Matthaiya	
1995	Aakaya Pookkal	Suriya	
1995	Maa Manithan	Nagu	
1996	Thayagam	Pilot	
1996	Musthaffaa	Musthaffaa	
1996	Puthiya Parasakthi	Rajadurai	
1996	Rajali	Rajali	
1997	Ettupatti Rasa	Singarasu	Tamil Nadu State Film Award Special Prize, Also singer for song "Ettupatti Rasa"
1998	Kizhakkum Merkkum	Suryamurthy	
1998	Bhagavath Singh	Bhagavath Singh	
1999	Maya	Pratap	Dubbed in Telugu as Gurupoornima
1999	Ethirum Pudhirum	Arasappan	
1999	Suyamvaram	Krishna	
1999	Ponvizha	Bharathi	
1999	Sivan	Murugan	
2000	Karisakattu Poove	Kottai Sami	
2000	Manu Neethi	Muthazhagu	
2001	Kalakalappu	Veluthambi	
2001	Veettoda Mappillai	Manikkam	
2001	Mitta Miraasu	Singa Perumal	
2002	Thenkasi Pattanam	Dass	
2004	Virumaandi	Nallama Nayakkar	
2004	Adi Thadi	Surya	
2004	Remote	Deenadayalu	
2005	Ayya	Madasamy	
2005	Veeranna	Mariappan, Veeranna	
2006	Vattaram	Gurupadam	
2007	Pokkiri	Mohammed Mohideen Khan IPS	
2008	Sandai	Kamaraj	
2008	Dasavathaaram	Kulothunga Chola II	
2008	Aayutham Seivom	ACP Elumalai	
2009	Azhagar Malai	Pandithurai	
2011	Ponnar Shankar	Thalaiyoor Kaali	
2016	Kidaari	Kottur Durai	
2017	Muthuramalingam	Mookiah Thevar	
2017	Chennaiyil Oru Naal 2	Prabakaran	
2018	Seema Raja	Ariya Raja	
2021	Sulthan	Sethupathi	
2022	Anbarivu	Muniyandi	
2023	Vallavanukkum Vallavan	Minister	

=== Other language films ===
Year	Film	Role	Language	Notes
1993	Devasuram	Mundakal Shekaran	Malayalam	
1993	Kunthi Puthrudu	Sambasivudu	Telugu	
1994	Hello Brother	Mithra	Telugu	
1994	Gandheevam	Vincent	Malayalam	
1998	Government	Deva	Kannada	Dubbed in Tamil and Telugu as Government
1999	Jayasurya	Pratap	Kannada	
1999	Billa Ranga	Ranga	Kannada	
1999	Rowdy Brothers		Kannada	
2000	The Warrant	Ravi Ramakrishnan	Malayalam	Dubbed into Tamil as The Warrant
2000	The Gang	Kevin	Malayalam	
2000	Rayalaseema Ramanna Chowdary	Jadadhari Swamiji	Telugu	
2001	Megasandesam	Fr. Rossario	Malayalam	Dubbed into Tamil as Rosi
2001	Ravana Prabhu	Mundakkal Sekharan	Malayalam	
2002	Kanal Kireedam	Albin	Malayalam	Dubbed into Tamil as Mary Albert
2008	Krishnarjuna	Nallama Nayakkar	Telugu	
2009	Oy!	Dr. Harish Chandra Prasad	Telugu	
2009	Saleem	Singamanaidu	Telugu	
2018	Sharabha	Kartavaryudu	Telugu	
2019	Devil's Night: Dawn of the Nain Rouge	Dr. Kadhir	English	
2019	Christmas Coupon	Agent Kumar	English	
2022	One More Dream	Dr. Srini Vasan	English	Also executive producer
2022	Meathead	—N/a	English	Short film; producer
2024	Trap City	Nathan	English	

As singer

Year	Film	Song	Notes
1995	En Pondatti Nallava	"Ponnu Kulla"	
1999	Ettupatti Rasa	"Ettupatti Rasa"	
2005	Veeranna	"Veeranna"	
