= Aval Sumangalithan =

1985 film

- Theatrical release poster
- Directed by: Visu
- Written by: Visu
- Based on: Aval Sumangalithan by Visu
- Produced by: Rajam Balachander; Pushpa Kandaswamy
- Starring: Karthik; Ilavarasi
- Cinematography: N. Balakrishnan
- Edited by: Ganesh–Kumar
- Music by: M. S. Viswanathan
- Production company: Kavithalayaa Productions
- Release date: 19 July 1985
- Running time: 140 minutes
- Country: India
- Language: Tamil

Aval Sumangalithan (pronounced [aʋaɭ sumaŋɡaliðaːn] transl. She is indeed married) is a 1985 Indian Tamil-language drama film written and directed by Visu. Based on his play of the same name, the film stars Karthik and Ilavarasi. It was released on 19 July 1985. The film was remade in Telugu as Punyasthree (1986).

== Plot ==
In Kundrathur, Arumugam, a temple watchman, lives with his loving and contended family, including his wife Mangalam, daughter Uma, and younger son Mani. Arumugam and Mangalam search for a suitable groom for Uma through a marriage broker, seeking someone with good character, healthy habits, and refined manners. The broker presents the horoscope of Bhaskaran, a well-paid engineer from Neyveli. Arumugam visits Bhaskaran at his residence, where he meets Bhaskaran's close friends, Joy Mathew Kuriakose and Stella, who are like family to Bhaskaran after he lost his parents at a young age. Despite Bhaskaran's smoking habit, Arumugam is impressed by his genuine nature and accepts him as a potential son-in-law. However, Arumugam faces challenges in convincing his family to accept Bhaskaran.

Bhaskaran visits Arumugam's family and understands their financial struggles, and wins them over with his kindness. He agrees to marry Uma without demanding a dowry, and the two quickly get married. After the wedding, Uma moves to Neyveli. When Arumugam's family plans to visit their daughter and son-in-law, Arumugam buys gifts and snacks to share. Bhaskaran and Uma, who are financially stable, appreciate the thoughtful gesture. Arumugam and Mangalam take great care of their son-in-law, going to great lengths to ensure his comfort. Even a minor stomach ache would prompt them to react with concern and take swift action to alleviate his discomfort. Arumugam and his family begin visiting their son-in-law every weekend, fostering a deeper bond with him. Bhaskaran, in turn, celebrates Arumugam's 25th wedding anniversary in grand style, bringing immense joy to Arumugam and Mangalam.

However, Bhaskaran's health begins to decline, and he starts to vomit blood, which he keeps hidden from his loved ones. Arumugam and Mangalam are shocked to see Bhaskaran wearing reading glasses and, out of concern, ask him to undergo a comprehensive health checkup. During the checkup, Bhaskaran reveals that Uma is pregnant and arranges for them to meet his family doctor, Dr. Karuna Moorthy. Arumugam demands a life guarantee from Dr. Karuna Moorthy for his son-in-law. Unfortunately, the full-body checkup reveals that Bhaskaran has developed a brain tumor. Dr. Karuna Moorthy shares this news only with Kuriakose, warning him that Bhaskaran's vision was deteriorating due to the tumor and that his days were numbered, as no treatment could cure the tumor. Kuriakose is heartbroken but chooses not to reveal the truth to anyone, including Bhaskaran. However, Bhaskaran discovers some of the medication given to him and learns about his condition through a phone conversation with Dr. Karuna Moorthy. He confronts Kuriakose, and they both decide to keep the diagnosis a secret.

Understanding that his time was limited, Bhaskaran begins making arrangements to secure Uma's and the unborn child's future. He starts by giving away his puppy to his neighbor, Fernandes, to reduce expenses. Then, he transfers his properties and assets in Uma's name and speaks with his chairman to secure a job for her after his death. Bhaskaran also asks Kuriakose to marry Uma after his death, but Kuriakose refuses, considering himself Uma's brother. Meanwhile, Arumugam and Mangalam notice Bhaskaran selling off his luxurious items, but he deceives them by saying he is being transferred abroad and needs to liquidate his assets. He hands over the documents to Arumugam. Despite his health issues, Bhaskaran wishes to celebrate the baby shower function early, which is successfully organized. Meanwhile, Dr. Karuna Moorthy in a medical conference learns about a breakthrough treatment for brain tumors at the John F. Kennedy Memorial Hospital in New York. He promptly arranges for Bhaskaran to receive medical treatment in the USA. The doctor who developed the treatment, Dr. Narasima Iyengar "Nary", urges Karuna Moorthy to bring Bhaskaran to the USA before he loses his vision.

Bhaskaran writes a letter to Uma, revealing his illness, and entrusts it to Kuriakose to deliver after his death. Around the same time, Arumugam takes Uma to their home a day before Diwali and asks Bhaskaran, Kuriakose, and Stella to complete their work and join them in Kundrathur soon. As Bhaskaran's vision deteriorates, Karuna Moorthy sends his assistant to inform him about the treatment in the USA and requests that he depart immediately. Kuriakose rushes from Neyveli to Madras and arranges the necessary funds and other formalities while leaving Bhaskaran alone in Neyveli. Unbeknownst to Kuriakose, Stella hands Uma the letter, thinking it was a love letter from Bhaskaran and Uma is shattered upon reading the letter. In Neyveli, Kuriakose realizes the letter is missing and hastens to Madras with Bhaskaran to inform Uma about the treatment in the USA and reassure her that Bhaskaran would recover.

Tragically, before they could arrive, the heartbroken Uma, unable to bear the thought of losing Bhaskaran, takes poison and dies. Bhaskaran is devastated, lamenting that Uma had made a fatal decision, as he might have been cured soon. In the end, Arumugam sends Bhaskaran to the USA for treatment, and the film concludes with the revelation that Uma will forever remain a woman married to Bhaskaran, as the title suggests.

== Cast ==
- Karthik as Bhaskaran
- Chandrasekhar as Joy Mathew Kuriakose "Kuriakose"
- Kishmu as Dr. Karuna Moorthy
- Ilavarasi as Uma
- Nisha Noor as Stella
- Master Haja Sheriff as Mani
- K. R. Vijaya as Mangalam
- Visu as Arumugam
- Omakuchi Narasimhan as a marriage broker
- T. P. Gajendran as Fernandes
- Kasthuri Raja as compounder

== Soundtrack ==
The music was composed by M. S. Viswanathan. The lyricist of the song "Sudaraga Oliyaga" is not credited on the LP records, where the song itself does not appear.

Song	Lyrics	Singer(s)	Length
'Malligai Poovinil'	Idhayachandran	S. P. Balasubrahmanyam	4:29
'Ninaithal Manakkum'	Na. Kamarasan	K. J. Yesudas, S. Janaki	4:28
'Ponmani Poomagal'	Jothi Pandian	P. Susheela	4:04
'Sudaraga Oliyaga'		Vani Jairam	4:42
'Vaanga Mappila'	Pulamaipithan	S. P. Balasubrahmanyam, S. P. Sailaja	4:32

== Reception ==
Jayamanmadhan of Kalki wrote Visu is stunning in the comedy, the compelling knotted story, the gripping characters and the heart-wrenching sadness at the end, all of which are underpinned by his dialogues.
