= Madurai Meenakshi (film) =

- DVD cover
- Directed by: P. Amirtham
- Screenplay by: M. Karunanidhi
- Story by: P. Harirajan
- Dialogues by: M. Karunanidhi
- Produced by: A. Gunanithi
- Starring: Selva Ranjitha
- Cinematography: P. Amirtham
- Edited by: P. Venkateswara Rao
- Music by: Deva
- Production companies: Poomalai Productions; AKM Productions
- Release date: 24 February 1993
- Running time: 145 minutes
- Country: India
- Language: Tamil

Madurai Meenakshi is a 1993 Indian Tamil-language film directed by P. Amirtham and written by M. Karunanidhi from a story by P. Harirajan. The film stars Selva and Ranjitha, with Sujatha, Captain Raju, Pradeep Shakthi, Vijayakumar, Nassar, and Sabitha Anand playing supporting roles. It was released on 24 February 1993.

== Plot ==
Madurai, a traffic police who dreams to become a police inspector, lives with his mother Maragatham. One day, he clashes with Meenakshi, the daughter of the corrupt home minister Ulaganathan. Meenakshi uses her father's clout to change Madurai's duty, and Madurai becomes her house guard. Meenakshi spends her time in humiliating the poor Madurai. Kumarasamy, his brother Kulasekaran, and his sister-in-law Gomathi run a free school for blind children in their property. The prime minister orders Ulaganathan to buy their property. But they refuse to sell it, so Ulaganathan's henchmen kill Kumarasamy. In the meantime, Madurai and Meenakshi fall in love. Ulaganathan gets to know of their love and transfers Madurai to the local police station. Inspector Rudra and Ulaganathan decide to buy Kulasekaran's property by force and to send Madurai behind bars. What transpires next forms the rest of the story.

== Cast ==
- Selva as Madurai
- Ranjitha as Meenakshi
- Sujatha as Maragatham
- Captain Raju as Ulaganathan
- Pradeep Shakthi as Inspector Rudra
- Vijayakumar as Kumarasamy
- Nassar as Kulasekaran
- Sabitha Anand as Gomathi
- S. S. Chandran as Brammayya
- Vijay Krishnaraj as Stephen
- Chandrasekhar as DGP
- Prathapachandran as Judge
- Thideer Kannaiah as Madasamy

== Production ==
The dialogues were written by AR Murugadoss.

== Soundtrack ==
The soundtrack was composed by Deva, with lyrics written by M. Karunanidhi and Vairamuthu.

Song	Singer(s)	Duration
"I Love You Meena"	S. P. Balasubrahmanyam, K. S. Chithra	4:38
"Maalai"	Mano, K. S. Chithra	4:17
"Neethi Mandram"	Malaysia Vasudevan	3:11
"Thanga Kunam"	K. S. Chithra, Chorus	2:13

== Release and reception ==
Madurai Meenakshi was released on 24 February 1993. A petition was filed against the film for negative portrayal of politicians; however, the Supreme Court rejected the plea. R. P. R. of Kalki appreciated Deva's music but said Amirtham's cinematography was better than his direction.
