= Kasthuri Raja =

Indian director

- Born: R. Krishnamoorthy Naidu; 8 August 1946 (age 80); Theni, Tamil Nadu, India
- Occupations: Film director; producer; music director; lyricist; actor
- Years active: 1991–2006, 2018–present
- Political party: BJP (2015)
- Spouse: Vijayalakshmi
- Children: 4, including Selvaraghavan and Dhanush

R. Krishnamoorthy Naidu (born 8 August 1946), popularity known as Kasthuri Raja, an Indian filmmaker, lyricist and actor. He is the father of filmmakers/actors Selvaraghavan and Dhanush. Most of the films he directed were village based. Prior to entering the film industry, he ran away from home to Chennai and worked in a mill. In 2015, he joined the BJP.

== Personal life ==
Kasthuri Raja was born as Krishnamoorthy Naidu on 8 August 1951 to a Telugu Gavara Naidu family in Theni, Tamil Nadu. His parents were Ramasamy Naidu and Rengamma. He is married to Vijayalakshmi, and the couple has four children, including sons Selvaraghavan and Dhanush, both of whom are prominent filmmakers and actors in Tamil cinema.

== Filmography ==
As director, producer and writer

Year	Film	Director	Producer	Notes
1991	En Rasavin Manasile	Yes	No	
1991	Aatha Un Koyilile	Yes	No	
1991	Thoothu Po Chellakkiliye	Yes	No	
1992	Solaiyamma	Yes	No	
1992	Mouna Mozhi	Yes	No	
1994	Thaai Manasu	Yes	No	
1996	Nattupura Pattu	Yes	Yes	
1997	Vasuke	Yes	No	
1997	Ettupatti Rasa	Yes	No	
1998	Veera Thalattu	Yes	Yes	
1998	En Aasai Rasave	Yes	No	
1998	Veeram Vilanja Mannu	Yes	No	
1999	Kummi Paattu	Yes	Yes	
2000	Karisakattu Poove	Yes	Yes	
2002	Thulluvadho Ilamai	Yes	No	
2004	Dreams	Yes	No	
2006	Idhu Kadhal Varum Paruvam	Yes	Yes	Also music director
2012	3	No	Presenter	
2025	Nilavuku En Mel Ennadi Kobam	No	Yes	

As an actor

Year	Title	Role	Notes
1985	Aval Sumangalithan	Compounder	
1992	Mouna Mozhi		
2025	Padai Thalaivan	Velu's father	
2026	Habeebi	Mohammad Yousuf	
2026	DC	Sendhooran	

As lyricist

- Solaiyamma - all songs
- Thaai Manasu - all songs
- Kummi Paatu - all songs
- Ettupatti Raasa - all songs
- Dreams - all songs
- Idhu Kadhal Varum Paruvam - all songs
