= Kumarimuthu =

Former Tamil film actor, comedian and politician

- Born: 20 December 1940; Kanyakumari, Tamil Nadu, India
- Died: 28 February 2016 (aged 75); Chennai, Tamil Nadu, India
- Occupation: Actor
- Years active: 1979–2016
- Spouse: Punniyavathi
- Children: 4
- Awards: Kalaimamani Award (1998)

Kumarimuthu (20 December 1940 – 28 February 2016) was an Indian actor, comedian and politician of the Dravida Munnetra Kazhagam (DMK). He was known for his unique comical laugh.

== Career ==
Kumarimuthu initially aspired to become a police officer but could not because of his poor eyesight. He starred in 728 films in his career spanning over three decades. He usually played comic roles and was known for his trademark laugh. He was a member of the political party Dravida Munnetra Kazhagam (DMK). Kumarimuthu was also a member of Nadigar Sangam and was involved in a controversy where he was expelled from the Nadigar Sangam over allegations of speaking negatively about the association, after he questioned the intent behind the land lease and building demolition.

== Death ==
He died at the age of 75 on 28 February 2016 due to age-related ailments.

== Awards ==
- Kalaimamani Award - 1998

== Partial filmography ==
=== Tamil films ===
Year	Film	Role	Notes
1978	Ivai Oru Seethai		
1979	Uthiripookkal		
1980	Johnny		
1980	Poottaatha Poottukkal		
1980	Nenjathai Killathe	Chintamani	
1981	Nandu		
1982	Metti		
1982	Mullillatha Roja		
1982	Parvaiyin Marupakkam		
1982	Kozhi Koovuthu		
1984	Madurai Sooran		
1984	Vellai Pura Ondru		
1984	Kai Kodukkum Kai		
1985	Naane Raja Naane Mandhiri		
1985	Avan		
1986	December Pookal		
1986	Oomai Vizhigal		
1986	Pudhiya Poovithu		
1986	Aruvadai Naal	Lotha	
1986	Oru Iniya Udhayam		
1986	Neethana Antha Kuyil		
1987	Cooliekkaran	Police constable	
1987	Veeran Veluthambi		
1987	Anand		
1987	Chinna Kuyil Paaduthu		
1987	Parisam Pottachu		
1987	Manaivi Ready		
1988	Chinna Poove Mella Pesu		
1988	Manasukkul Mathappu		
1988	Idhu Namma Aalu	Gopal's Father	
1988	Oorai Therinjikitten	Mental	
1988	Sahadevan Mahadevan		
1989	Mounam Sammadham	Munusamy	
1989	Pongi Varum Kaveri		
1990	Pondatti Thevai		
1990	Pudhu Vasantham		
1990	Erikkarai Poonkatre		
1991	Nanbargal		
1991	Irumbu Pookkal		
1991	Cheran Pandiyan		
1991	Sendhoora Devi		
1991	Pondatti Pondattithan	Pitchaimuthu	
1991	Idhayam		
1991	Manasara Vazhthungalen		
1992	Thangarasu		
1992	Naangal		
1992	Enga Veetu Velan		
1992	Innisai Mazhai	Saravanan	
1993	Pettredutha Pillai		
1993	Porantha Veeda Puguntha Veeda		
1993	Sabash Babu	Priest	
1993	Kizhakke Varum Paattu		
1994	Indhu		
1994	Sakthivel		
1994	Vaanga Partner Vaanga		
1995	Oru Oorla Oru Rajakumari		
1995	Aanazhagan		
1995	Thamizhachi		
1995	Marumagan	Arumugam	
1995	Thedi Vandha Raasa		
1995	Chakravarthy		
1995	Rajavin Parvaiyile		
1995	Vishnu		
1995	Mannukku Mariyadhai		
1995	Muthu	Kamalakannan	
1995	Thotta Chinungi		
1996	Mahaprabhu	Gnana Kannan	
1996	Take It Easy Urvashi		
1996	Nattupura Pattu		
1996	Meendum Savithri		
1996	Vaazhga Jananayagam		
1996	Puthiya Parasakthi		
1996	Vishwanath		
1996	Mettukudi		
1997	Nattupura Nayagan		
1997	Kadhal Palli	Kirupakaran	
1998	Ellame En Pondattithaan	Anal Poriyar	
1999	Ninaivirukkum Varai	Astrologer	
1999	Ethirum Pudhirum		
1999	Viralukketha Veekkam	House owner	
1999	Suyamvaram	Compounder	
1999	Anbulla Kadhalukku		
1999	Pudhu Kudithanam		
1999	Nee Enthan Vaanam		
2000	Kannukku Kannaga	Perumal	
2001	Ullam Kollai Poguthae	Annachi	
2002	Thenkasi Pattanam	Milkman Pasupathi	
2002	Namma Veetu Kalyanam		
2002	Andipatti Arasampatti	Arasampatti's father	
2002	Solla Marandha Kadhai		
2004	Jananam		
2005	Mannin Maindhan	Police Constable	
2005	Kaatrullavarai	Muthu	
2005	Thirupaachi	Kannappan's father	
2006	Desiya Paravai		
2009	Villu	Eyewitness	

=== Other language films ===
Year	Film	Role	Language	Notes
1993	Kulapathi		Malayalam	
1996	Hello Guru		Telugu	
1996	Neti Savithri		Telugu	
2011	Olave Mandara	Tamilian	Kannada	
