= List of Tamil films of 1994 =

Post-amendment to the Tamil Nadu Entertainments Tax Act 1939 on 1 April 1958, Gross jumped to 140 per cent of Nett Commercial Taxes Department disclosed ₹88 crore in entertainment tax revenue for the year.

A list of films produced in the Tamil film industry in India in 1994 by release date:

== Films ==
=== January — March ===
Opening		Title	Director	Cast	Production	Ref
J A N	13	Amaidhi Padai	Manivannan	Sathyaraj, Ranjitha, Kasthuri	M. R. Films International	
J A N	14	Mahanadhi	Santhana Bharathi	Kamal Haasan, Sukanya	Sree Amman Creations	
J A N	14	Rajakumaran	R. V. Udayakumar	Prabhu, Meena, Nadhiya, Goundamani, Senthil	Sivaji Productions	
J A N	14	Ravanan	E. Ramdoss	Mansoor Ali Khan, Ahana	Raj Kennedy Films	
J A N	14	Sethupathi IPS	P. Vasu	Vijayakanth, Meena, Goundamani, Senthil	AVM Productions	
J A N	14	Sindhu Nathi Poo	Senthamizhan	Ranjith, Rajakumari	A. R. S. Film International	
J A N	14	Siragadikka Aasai	Vijayachandran	Sivakumar, Vijayakumar, Manjula Vijayakumar, Zeenat	Yadhav Productions	
J A N	14	Vaanga Partner Vaanga	Rama Narayanan	Visu, Radha Ravi, S. S. Chandran, Vennira Aadai Moorthy	Azhagar Films	
J A N	14	Veetla Visheshanga	K. Bhagyaraj	K. Bhagyaraj, Pragathi, Suresh	Bhagyam Cine Combines	
F E B	4	Paasamalargal	Suresh Chandra Menon	Arvind Swamy, Revathi, Ajith Kumar	Tele Photo Films	
F E B	5	Veettai Paaru Naattai Paaru	Thulasidas	Sivakumar, Saravanan, Ranjitha, Jayanthi	Anbalaya Films	
F E B	10	Athiradi Padai	R. K. Selvamani	Rahman, Roja	R. K. Star Productions	
F E B	11	Subramaniya Swamy	Pandiarajan	Pandiarajan, Priya Raman, Urvashi	R. K. Arts	
F E B	18	Kaviyam	M. Ponraj	Ruban George, Nandhini	Aarthi Film Circuit	
F E B	18	Chinna Muthu	Shanmuga Sundaram	Radha Ravi, Vaishnavi, Roopesh Raj, Asha	B. R. R. Art Enterprises	
F E B	25	Aranmanai Kaavalan	Selva Vinayagam	Sarath Kumar, Sivaranjani	Lakshmi Movie Makers	
F E B	25	Magalir Mattum	Singeetham Srinivasa Rao	Revathi, Urvashi, Rohini, Nassar	Raaj Kamal Films International	
M A R	4	Pondattiye Deivam	N. K. Viswanathan	S. Ve. Shekher, Sithara	Kalyani Cine Arts	
M A R	4	Uzhiyan	C. Durai Pandian	C.Arunpandian, Vineetha	Lakshmikaran Enterprises	
M A R	18	En Rajangam	Siraj	Anandaraj, Ramarjun, Vinodhini, Sreeja	M. S. Film Circuit	
M A R	18	Purushanai Kaikkulla Pottukkanum	Balanna	Janagaraj, Nizhalgal Ravi, Sreeja, Pallavi	Gothaari Creations	

=== April — June ===
Opening		Title	Director	Cast	Production	Ref
A P R	8	Rasa Magan	Manivannan	Prashanth, Sivaranjani	M. S. R. Films	
A P R	14	Adharmam	Ramesh Krishnan	Murali, Ranjitha	G. K. Films International	
A P R	14	Honest Raj	K. S. Ravi	Vijayakanth, Gautami, Aamani	Sathya Jyothi Films	
A P R	14	Indhu	Pavithran	Prabhu Deva, Roja, Sarath Kumar	Anand Associates	
A P R	14	Sakthivel	K. S. Ravikumar	Selva, Kanaka	AVM Productions	
A P R	14	Varavu Ettana Selavu Pathana	V. Sekhar	Nassar, Radhika, Goundamani, Senthil, Vadivelu	Thiruvalluvar Kalaikoodam	
A P R	14	Veera	Suresh Krissna	Rajinikanth, Meena, Roja	P. A. Art Productions	
A P R	15	Seeman	Raj Kapoor	Karthik, Sukanya, Goundamani, Senthil	M. G. Pictures	
A P R	15	Vandicholai Chinraasu	Manoj Kumar	Sathyaraj, Sukanya	Vivekananda Films	
M A Y	5	Oru Vasantha Geetham	T. Rajendar	T. Rajendar, Gautami, Silambarasan	Chimbu Cine Arts	
M A Y	13	Vaa Magale Vaa	Visu	Visu, Khushbu, Rekha, Veera Pandiyan	Sri Thenandal Films	
M A Y	20	Duet	K. Balachander	Prabhu, Ramesh Aravind, Meenakshi Seshadri, Prakash Raj	Kavithalayaa Productions	
M A Y	20	Jai Hind	Arjun	Arjun, Ranjitha, Goundamani, Senthil	Shri Mishri Productions	
M A Y	21	Namma Annachi	Dhalapathi	Sarath Kumar, Heera, Radhika	Vaasan Brothers	
M A Y	27	Priyanka	Neelakanta	Revathi, Prabhu, Jayaram	Neelakanta Arts	
J U N	10	Pathavi Pramanam	K. R. Udhayashankar	Vijayakanth, Vineetha, Ramesh Aravind, Keerthana	Sree Rajakaali Amman Enterprises	
J U N	17	Sevatha Ponnu	A. Chandrakumar	Saravanan, Ahana	Yaghava Productions	
J U N	24	Manasu Rendum Pudhusu	P. Amirtham	Jayaram, Khushbu	Poomalai Productions	
J U N	24	Seevalaperi Pandi	Prathap K. Pothan	Napoleon, Saranya, Ahana	Radhi Films	

=== July — September ===
Opening		Title	Director	Cast	Production	Ref
J U L	1	Maindhan	Pugazhendhi	Selva, Nirosha	Pateeshvarathal Films	
J U L	8	Rasigan	S. A. Chandrasekhar	Vijay, Sanghavi, Goundamani, Senthil	B. V. Combines	
J U L	15	Chinna Madam	Dilip Kumar	Ramki, Nadhiya, Vineetha	Super Good Films	
J U L	15	Mettupatti Mirasu	Anu Mohan	Sivakumar, Arjun, Radhika, Suman Ranganathan, Goundamani, Senthil	Sharmila Movies	
J U L	15	Pudhupatti Ponnuthayi	N. K. Viswanathan	Napoleon, Radhika	Azhagar Films	
J U L	15	Vietnam Colony	Santhana Bharathi	Prabhu, Vineetha, Goundamani	Sree Ganesh Vision	
J U L	22	Sadhu	P. Vasu	Arjun, Raveena Tandon	Eashwara Chandra Combines	
J U L	22	Watchman Vadivel	A. Jagannathan	Sivakumar, Sujatha, Anand Babu, Kasthuri	Sri R. K. Films Pictures	
J U L	29	Sevvanthi	P. S. Nivas	Santhana Pandian, Srija	Danisha Pictures	
J U L	31	Kanmani	R. K. Selvamani	Prashanth, Mohini	Kalyani Cine Productions	
A U G	12	Senthamizh Selvan	Manoj Kumar	Prashanth, Madhubala, Sivaranjani	Shree Vijayalakshmi Movieland	
A U G	12	Thozhar Pandian	Manivannan	Sathyaraj, Ranjitha	K. B. Films	
A U G	19	Mudhal Manaivi	Rajarishi	Ilavarasi	Aruna Movies	
A U G	19	Thamarai	K. K. Rajasirpy	Napoleon, Rupini, Rohini	Kalichirpi	
A U G	24	Sarigamapadani	R. Parthiepan	R. Parthiepan, Roja, Sangita	Abhi Creations	
A U G	26	En Aasai Machan	R. Sundarrajan	Vijayakanth, Murali, Revathi, Ranjitha	Tamil Annai Cine Creations	
A U G	26	Killadi Mappillai	J. George Prasad	Pandiarajan, Sindhuja, Divyasri	Maruthi Art Films	
S E P	1	Needhiya Nyayama	T. Janakiraman	S. V. Subbaih, Kanchana	Singaravelu Films	
S E P	1	Thaatboot Thanjavoor	Vijaya Krishnaraj	Babu Ganesh, Heera, Subhashri	Ashwin International	
S E P	9	May Maadham	Balu	Vineeth, Sonali Kulkarni	GV Films	
S E P	9	Raja Pandi	Manoj Kumar	Sarath Kumar, Sukanya, Kasthuri, Sangita	Muktha Arts	
S E P	9	Sathyavan	Raj Kapoor	Murali, Gautami, Goundamani, Senthil	N. S. R. Productions	
S E P	9	Ungal Anbu Thangachi	Jacobbreez	Raja Raveendar, Keerthana	Bernaando Films	
S E P	16	Hero	A. Jagannathan	Rahman, Sukanya, Vinod Kumar Alva	Sree Sauthamini Creations	
S E P	16	Mudhal Payanam	A. K. Ravi Varma	Anand, Meera	Best Creations	
S E P	16	Thai Maaman	Guru Dhanapal	Sathyaraj, Meena, Goundamani, Senthil	M. G. Pictures	
S E P	16	Veeramani	Prem	Prem, Yuvarani	A Lotus Film Company	
S E P	17	Kaadhalan	Shankar	Prabhu Deva, Nagma, Raghuvaran, S. P. Balasubrahmanyam	A. R. S. Film International	
S E P	23	Pattukottai Periyappa	Visu	Anand Babu, Mohini, Vinodhini	Raja Pushpa Pictures	
S E P	23	Pudhusa Pootha Roosa	P. S. Dharan	Nishant, Apsara	M. R. Movie Makers	
S E P	30	Thalavanin Arulullam	R. V. Udayakumar	Prabhu, Sukanya	AVM Productions	
S E P	30	Ulavaali	Kalaipuli G. Sekaran	Ramki, Vineetha	Sundar Creators	

=== October — December ===
Opening		Title	Director	Cast	Production	Ref
O C T	7	Ilaignar Ani	K. R. Selvaraj	Radha Ravi, Harish, Ranjeev, Sonia, Harikumar, Padmashri	Akshaya Theatres	
O C T	7	Thendral Varum Theru	N. G. Gowri Manohar	Ramesh Aravind, Kasthuri, Rizabawa	Tamizh Magal Creations	
N O V	2	Jallikattu Kaalai	Manivasagam	Prabhu, Kanaka, Goundamani, Senthil	K. B. Films	
N O V	2	Mani Rathnam	K. Jayabalan	Napoleon, Anand Babu, Mohana, Chandhini	Trax Creations	
N O V	2	Nammavar	K. S. Sethumadhavan	Kamal Haasan, Gautami	Chandamama Vijaya Combines	
N O V	2	Nattamai	K. S. Ravikumar	Sarath Kumar, Meena, Khushbu, Goundamani, Senthil	Super Good Films	
N O V	2	Pavithra	K. Subash	Radhika, Ajith Kumar, Keerthana	Thanuja Films	
N O V	2	Periya Marudhu	N. K. Viswanathan	Vijayakanth, Ranjitha, Goundamani, Senthil	Meenakshi Arts	
N O V	3	Karuthamma	Bharathiraja	Raja, Rajashri, Maheswari	Vetrivel Art Creations	
N O V	3	Veera Padhakkam	Manivannan	Sathyaraj, Radhika, Urvashi	Raj Films International	
N O V	24	Nila	Nambhiraaj	Jayaram, Vineetha, Goundamani, Senthil	Shri Sairam Arts	
N O V	25	Magudikkaran	Yaar Kannan	Sarath Kumar, Dev Anand, Chithra	Sri Gayathri Cine Arts	
D E C	2	Pandiyanin Rajyathil	Santhosh	Pandiarajan, Pragathi	Vellore Film Associates	
D E C	2	Pudhiya Mannargal	Vikraman	Vikram, Mohini, Babu Ganesh, Nalinikanth	Paradise Pictures	
D E C	2	Thaai Manasu	Kasthuri Raja	Saravanan, Suvarna Mathew, Goundamani, Senthil	Karpaga Jothi Films	
D E C	9	Atha Maga Rathiname	Gangai Amaran	Selva, Ranjitha	Sheela Cine Arts	
D E C	9	Manju Virattu	L. S. Valaiyapathi	Murali, Mohana	Thennagam Creations	
D E C	16	Chinna Pulla	K. Baskaran	Chinni Jayanth, Revathi	Ashtalakshmi Creators	
D E C	16	Vanaja Girija	K. R.	Napoleon, Ramki, Khushbu, Urvashi, Mohini	P. A. Art Productions	
