= Radha Ravi filmography =

Indian actor and politician

Radha Ravi (born 29 July 1952) is an Indian actor and politician who played supporting roles throughout his career. He is the son of actor M. R. Radha and the uncle of Vasu Vikram and half-brother of Radhika. He is a former chief member of the Tamil Nadu Film Artistes' Association. He is known for his roles as antagonists in Tamil films and a he acted in the serial Chellamae. He is also known for his controversial criticism of other film personalities. The following is a complete list of his films:

== Filmography ==
=== Tamil ===
Year	Title	Role	Notes	Ref
1976	Manmadha Leelai			
1978	Veettukaari			
1978	Rudra Thandavam	Gopal		
1978	Thirukkalyanam			
1980	Bombay Mail 109			
1980	Tharaiyil Vaazhum Meengal			
1980	Saranam Ayyappa			
1981	Thanneer Thanneer	Alagiri		
1982	Kaadhal Oviyam			
1982	Paritchaikku Neramaachu	Samuel		
1983	Uyirullavarai Usha			
1983	Sivappu Sooriyan	Ravi		
1983	Soorakottai Singakutti			
1983	Thambadigal			
1983	Poikkal Kudhirai	Nair		
1984	Madurai Sooran			
1984	Theerppu En Kaiyil			
1984	Thiruttu Rajakkal			
1984	Poovilangu			
1984	Rajathanthiram	Japaan		
1984	Achamillai Achamillai	Henchman		
1984	Sattathai Thiruthungal			
1984	Simma Soppanam	Naresh		
1984	Thanga Koppai	Ravi		
1984	Kalyana Kanavugal			
1984	Vai Pandal			
1984	Iru Medhaigal	Ravi		
1984	Vaidehi Kathirunthal	Vellikizhamai Ramasamy		
1984	Vai Pandal			
1984	Thenkoodu			
1985	Alai Osai			
1985	Chain Jayapal			
1985	Naagam	Ravi		
1985	Deivapiravi	Minor		
1985	Urimai	Kannaayiram		
1985	Naam			
1985	Ragasiyam			
1985	Annai Bhoomi 3D	Somu		
1985	Anthasthu	Madan		
1985	Uyarndha Ullam	Selvam		
1985	Kutravaaligal			
1985	Engal Kural			
1985	Paartha Gnabagam Illayo			
1985	Ketti Melam	Muniyandi		
1986	Karimedu Karuvayan			
1986	Dharma Pathini	D. Janardhanan		
1986	Selvaakku			
1986	Thiramai			
1986	Natpu			
1986	Amman Kovil Kizhakale			
1986	Sarvam Sakthimayam	Alavanda		
1986	Kovil Yaanai			
1986	Vasantha Raagam	Minister Anbarasan		
1986	Ragasiyam			
1986	Odangal			
1986	Thalaiyatti Bommaigal			
1986	Mel Maruvathoor Arpudhangal	Rajadurai		
1987	Ivargal Indiyargal	Palayathan		
1987	Solvathellam Unmai	Fake Dr. Ramanathan		
1987	Ayyappaswamy			
1987	Thulasi			
1987	Vaazhga Valarga			
1987	Thangachi	Dharmaraja		
1987	Veerapandiyan	Nanjappa		
1987	Paadu Nilave			
1987	Cooliekkaran	Chakravarthy		
1987	Veeran Veluthambi	Veeran Veluthambi		
1987	Ninaive Oru Sangeetham	Bairava		
1987	Naagam			
1987	Ore Raththam			
1987	Idhu Engal Needhi			
1987	Ellaikodu			
1987	Kathai Kathayam Karanamam			
1987	Chellakutti			
1987	Uzhavan Magan	Gunasekhar		
1988	Ennai Vittu Pogaathe			
1988	Solla Thudikuthu Manasu	Vasudevan		
1988	Guru Sishyan	Muthuraja		
1988	Ullathil Nalla Ullam	Peter		
1988	Raasave Unnai Nambi	Pattalathan		
1988	En Uyir Kannamma	Nallamuthu		
1988	Kazhugu Malaikkallan			
1988	Kalyana Paravaigal			
1988	Thambi Thanga Kambi	Periya Durai		
1988	Uzhaithu Vaazha Vendum	Arun		
1989	Pongi Varum Kaveri			
1989	Rajadhi Raja	Aadimoolam		
1989	Siva			
1989	Rettaikuzhal Thuppaakki			
1989	Thalaivanukore Thalaivi	Pari		
1989	Solaikuyil	Maayandi (Thalaiadi)		
1989	Paalaivanathil Pattaampoochi			
1989	Kovilmani Osai			
1989	Thendral Sudum			
1989	Annanukku Jai			
1989	Vetri Vizha	Nithyanandam		
1989	Rajanadai	Chakravarthy		
1990	Panakkaran	Rao Bhathur		
1990	Manaivi Oru Manickam			
1990	Pudhu Padagan	Doctor		
1990	Pulan Visaranai	R. R.		
1990	Unnai Solli Kutramillai	Veerapandian		
1990	Seetha	Chakravarthy		
1990	Pattanamthan Pogalamadi			
1990	Chilambu			
1990	Adhisaya Manithan	Guest Appearance		
1990	Engitta Mothathay			
1990	Thai Maasam Poovaasam			
1991	Vaa Arugil Vaa	Nalla Thambi		
1991	Vanakkam Vathiyare	Malaichami		
1991	Chithirai Pookkal	Lollai Kaadu		
1991	Vetri Karangal			
1991	Chinna Thambi	Eldest brother of Nandhini		
1991	Idhu Namma Bhoomi	Rathnavel		
1991	Vigneshwar	Amir Nath		
1991	Thambikku Oru Pattu			
1991	Oyilattam			
1991	Kurumbukkaaran			
1991	Rasathi Varum Naal	Gowri		
1992	Amaran	Aandava Perumal		
1992	Rickshaw Mama	Aravinth		
1992	Agni Paarvai	Minister Thirumurthy		
1992	Sugamana Sumaigal	Thangaraj		
1992	Chembaruthi	Paandi		
1992	Idhu Namma Bhoomi	Rathnavel		
1992	Annaamalai	Gangadharan		
1992	Naalaiya Theerpu	Arun Mehta		
1993	Chinna Mappillai	Aalavanthan / PeriyaPannai		
1993	Pandithurai	Malaisamy		
1993	Chinna Thayee	Inspector Sankarapandian		
1993	Uthama Raasa	Parama Thevar		
1993	Vedan	Megharajan		
1993	Chellakannu	Dhandapani		
1993	Namma Annachi	Vadivelu		
1993	Uzhaippali	Ragupathy		
1993	Kattalai	Venkadachalam		
1993	Rojavai Killathe	Ayyanar		
1993	Enga Muthalali	Seetharaman Reddy		
1994	Vaanga Partner Vaanga	Ponnappan		
1994	Chinna Muthu	Chinnamuthu		
1994	Oru Vasantha Geetham			
1994	Priyanka			
1994	Sadhu	Vibhuthi Veeramuthu		
1994	En Aasai Machan	Police officer		
1994	Ilaignar Ani	Rajarajan		
1995	Indira	Kotamarayar		
1995	Lucky Man	"Cheating" Sivaraman		
1995	Makkal Aatchi	Chief minister Vaduganathan		
1995	Kizhakkumalai			
1995	Marumagan	Mayilsamy Gounder		
1995	Asuran	Rajasekhar		
1995	Coolie	Loganathan		
1995	Neela Kuyil	Raja		
1995	Muthu	Ambalathar		
1996	Kizhakku Mugam	Poongodi's father		
1996	Katta Panchayathu	Kathirvel		
1996	Vishwanath	Rajkumar		
1996	Poovarasan	Senadapathi		
1996	Vetri Vinayagar	Kaja Mukasooran		
1997	Vaimaye Vellum	Rajendran		
1997	Vasuki	Pakkiri		
1997	Thadayam	Jothi's father		
1997	Kadhalukku Mariyadhai	James		
1998	Ulavuthurai	Home Minister Jaidev		
1998	Veera Thalattu			
1998	Thalaimurai			
1998	Veeram Vilanja Mannu	M.L.A Sundarapandi		
1998	Pooveli	Chidambaram Pillai		
1999	Suriya Paarvai	Sundaramoorthy		
1999	Ponnu Veetukkaran	Gangadaran		
1999	Endrendrum Kadhal	Krishna		
1999	Poo Vaasam			
1999	Padayappa	Neelambari's father		
1999	Poomagal Oorvalam	Chidambaram		
1999	Kannupada Poguthaiya	Angaala Thevar		
1999	Azhagarsamy	Landlord		
2000	Simmasanam	Sakthivel's cousin		
2000	Vanna Thamizh Pattu	Muthumanikkam		
2001	Friends	Abhirami's father		
2001	Narasimha	Manimaran		
2002	Raja	Kathiresan		
2002	Karmegham	Karmegham's father		
2002	Baba	Minister of Tourism		
2002	Kadhal Azhivathillai	Charmi's father		
2003	Kadhaludan	Durai's father		
2003	Dum	Inspector		
2003	Lesa Lesa	Chandru's grandfather		
2003	Kalatpadai	Janakiraman		
2003	Jayam	Raja		
2004	Jana	Sankarapandi		
2004	Oru Murai Sollividu	Venkat's father		
2004	Gajendra	Shawkat Ali		
2005	Sevvel	Lawyer		
2006	Saravana	Saravana's father		
2006	Unarchigal	Seshadri		
2006	Kusthi	Chieftain		
2006	Chennai Kadhal	Sakthivel		
2006	Adaikalam	Somasundaram		
2007	Kalakkura Chandru	Ravi Verma		
2007	Thirumagan	Sivalingam		
2007	Maya Kannadi			
2007	Kannamoochi Yenada	Maheswaran Iyer		
2008	Alibhabha	MLA friend of Thilakan		
2008	Nayagan			
2009	Indira Vizha	Judge Sattanathan		
2009	1977	Dr Sharma		
2009	Ainthaam Padai	Minister		
2009	Madurai Sambavam	Aalamaram		
2009	Suriyan Satta Kalloori	College Principal		
2010	Kutty	Devanayagam		
2010	Thairiyam			
2010	Sura	Church father		
2010	Kola Kolaya Mundhirika	Dada Thulukkanam		
2010	Singam	Soundara Pandi		
2010	Pen Singam	Singaperumal		
2010	Thillalangadi	Minister Rajaraam	Uncredited role	
2010	Naane Ennul Illai			
2010	365 Kadhal Kadithangal	Rasu Thevar		
2010	Puthumugam	Harikumar		
2011	Sattapadi Kutram	Rathnavelu		
2011	Kumara			
2011	Vaanam	Police Inspector		
2012	Sattam Oru Iruttarai			
2013	Thirumathi Thamizh			
2013	Singam 2	Soundara Pandi		
2013	Soodhu Kavvum	Chief Minister of Tamil Nadu		
2014	Tenaliraman	Vassal-King Parasbaram		
2014	Ramanujan	Prof. Singaravelu Mudaliar		
2014	Aadama Jaichomada	Producer		
2014	Jamaai	College principal		
2014	Lingaa	Kavi Bharathi		
2014	Pisasu	Bhavani's father		
2015	Pulan Visaranai 2			
2015	Sandamarutham	Rangarajan		
2015	Sakalakala Vallavan	Kathiresan		
2016	Karaioram	Ramya's father	Uncredited role	
2016	Aranmanai 2	Maya's father		
2016	Irudhi Suttru	Boxing Chairman		
2016	Jil Jung Juk	Rolex Rawther		
2016	Aarathu Sinam	Police Commissioner		
2016	Mapla Singam	Town President Sevagapandian		
2016	Narathan	Anbazhagan		
2016	Manithan	Judge		
2016	Marudhu	Payilwan		
2016	Iraivi	Jagan's father		
2016	Thodari	Rengarajan		
2016	Achamindri	Education minister Karikalan		
2017	Si3	Soundara Pandi		
2017	Ennodu Vilayadu	Nagulan		
2017	Yaakkai	Krishnamurthy		
2017	Engitta Modhathey	Mandhramoorthy		
2017	Shivalinga	Krishnamoorthy		
2017	Sangili Bungili Kadhava Thorae	Sangili Aandhavan		
2017	Veera Vamsam			
2017	Annadurai	Mahalingam		
2018	Kalakalappu 2	Police inspector		
2018	Veera	Sketch Sekhar		
2018	Junga	Sopraj		
2018	Maniyaar Kudumbam	Padikattu Mudaliar		
2018	Marainthirunthu Paarkum Marmam Enna			
2018	Annanukku Jai	Parasuraman		
2018	Ratsasan	Rajamanickkam		
2018	Aan Devathai	Bullet Thatha		
2018	Vada Chennai	Muthu		
2018	Sarkar	Rendu		
2019	Vantha Rajavathaan Varuven	Pandithurai		
2019	Oviyavai Vitta Yaru	Seeni's father		
2019	100	Pistol Perumal		
2019	Ayogya	Judge		
2019	Nenjamundu Nermaiyundu Odu Raja	Jeepakaran		
2019	Dharmaprabhu	Yaman		
2019	Bodhai Yeri Budhi Maari	Karthik's father		
2019	Gorilla	Assistant commissioner		
2019	Sixer	Krithika's father		
2020	Dagaalty	Bhaiya		
2021	Bhoomi	Minister of Agriculture		
2021	Kalathil Santhippom	Appachi		
2021	Thalaivii	M. R. Radha		
2021	Rudra Thandavam	Indrasena		
2021	Raajavamsam	Nilamegam		
2021	Anti Indian	Mr. Senguttuvan		
2022	Don	Killivallavan		
2022	Maayon	Krishnappa Naicker		
2022	Kuruthi Aattam	Durai		
2023	Bakasuran	Natarajan		
2023	Jambu Maharishi			
2023	Maaveeran Pillai			
2023	Tamilarasan	Commissioner Sugumaaran IPS		
2023	Pichaikkaran 2	Chief Minister		
2023	Love	Divya's father		
2023	Saandrithazh			
2023	License	Thirunavukkarasu		
2023	Thee Ivan			
2024	Idi Minnal Kadhal	Father Edwin		
2024	Saamaniyan	Fazil Bhai		
2024	Bloody Beggar	Actor Chandrabose and Chandru	Dual role	
2024	Soodhu Kavvum 2	Sathyaseelan		
2025	Dinasari	Jayaseelan		
2025	Aghathiyaa	Seshathri		
2025	Kadaisi Thotta	Sivaraman		
2025	Varunan	Ayyavu		
2025	Jinn - The Pet			
2025	Desiya Thalaivar			
2025	Dawood			
2025	Middle Class	Detective		
2026	Con City	Abdul Razzak		

=== Telugu ===
- Kaliyuga Pandavulu (1986)
- Sahasame Naa Oopiri (1989)
- Maha Yagnam (1991)
- Aswamedham (1992)
- Satya 2 (2013)
- Rakshasudu (2019)

=== Malayalam ===
- Evidence (1988)
- Kulapathi (1993)
- Customs Diary (1993)
- Dadha (1994)
- Sundarimare Sookshikkuka (1995)
- Vettam (2004)

=== Kannada ===
- Ella Hanakkagi (1976)
- Rahasya Rathri (1979)
- Parva (2002)
- Alone (2015) (uncredited)

== Television ==
Year	Title	Role	Channel
2006	Vikramadithyan (Malayalam)		Asianet
2008	Thiruvilayadal	Narada	Sun TV
2009–2012	Chellamay	Kadarkaraiyaan	Sun TV
2013–2014	Ranga Vilas		Jaya TV

== Dubbing artist ==
Year	Film	Actor	Dubbed name	Notes
1991	Gang Leader	Rao Gopal Rao	Gang Leader	Tamil dubbed version
1999	Samarasimha Reddy	Jayaprakash Reddy	Shanmuga Pandian	Tamil dubbed version
2008	Slumdog Millionaire	Irrfan Khan	Naanum Kodeeswaran	Tamil dubbed version
2011	Aadukalam	V. I. S. Jayapalan		
2022	Kaari	Nagineedu		

== Producer ==
- Idhu Namma Bhoomi (1991)
- Thai Maasam Poo Vaasam (1991)
- Ilaignar Ani (1994)
- Chinna Muthu (1994)
