= Raasave Unnai Nambi =

- DVD cover
- Directed by: T. K. Bose
- Written by: Siraj
- Produced by: Rajkiran
- Starring: Ramarajan; Rekha; Poornam Viswanathan; Saritha
- Cinematography: P. Ganesapandian
- Edited by: L. Kesavan
- Music by: Ilaiyaraaja
- Production company: Red Sun Art Creations
- Release date: 10 March 1988
- Country: India
- Language: Tamil

Raasave Unnai Nambi is a 1988 Indian Tamil-language film, directed by T. K. Bose and produced by Rajkiran. The film stars Ramarajan, Rekha, Poornam Viswanathan and Saritha. It was released on 10 March 1988, and ran for 100 days.

== Plot ==
Malathi is a new teacher in a small town and stays in the house owned by Raja, another teacher at the school. Raja's older brother is an Army officer that everyone calls Pattalathan. He's well-respected in the town and is strict with anyone that attempts anything illegal or immoral. Vasu is a moonshiner that has had multiple run-ins with Pattalathan and nurses a grudge. His younger sister Ranjitham was in college with Raja. The two were in love but separate due to misunderstandings caused by their older brothers' clashes. Raja arranges for Malathi and Pattalathan to marry and the two are very happy together. Ranjitham's other brother Arunachalam, who ran away as a child, returns to town just as Pattalathan is deployed again. Malathi knew Arunachalam before she came to town and that prior relationship causes problems for the family. Things are exacerbated when Malathi learns that she is pregnant. The family tensions reach a critical juncture when Pattalathan returns to town.

== Cast ==
- Ramarajan as Raja
- Rekha as Ranjitham
- Saritha as Malathi
- Radha Ravi as Pattalathan
- Poornam Viswanathan as Doctor
- Malaysia Vasudevan as Vasu alias KD
- Kallapetti Singaram as Singaram
- Senthil as Azhagesan
- Kovai Sarala as Mynavathi
- Ilavarasan as Arunachalam
- Suryakanth
- S. S. Chandran
- Disco Shanti
- Usilai Mani as Veembu Veerasamy

== Soundtrack ==
The music was composed by Ilaiyaraaja.

| Song | Singers | Lyrics | Length |
|---|---|---|---|
| "Kaalai Nera Raagamey" | K. S. Chithra | Gangai Amaran | 04: 09 |
| "Raasathi Manasule" | P. Susheela, Mano | Ilaiyaraaja | 05 :10 |
| "Raasathi Manasule" (sad) | P. Susheela | Ilaiyaraaja | 05:13 |
| "Kamma Kara Yoram" | Malaysia Vasudevan, K. S. Chithra | Gangai Amaran | 04:22 |
| "Mayilaattam Paathuputtu" | Malaysia Vasudevan, Gangai Amaran | Gangai Amaran | 04:35 |
| "Seethaikoru" | Mano | Gangai Amaran | 04:48 |

== Reception ==
The Indian Express wrote, "The eyecaressing rural scenario and Ilayaraja's flutey music and songs are the saving grace whose style and manner remind you of films like Amman Koil Kizhakkale and Vaidehi Kaathirunthal. The contrivances of the plot set the clocks decades back". Susheela won in the Best Female Playback Singer category at the 9th Cinema Express Awards.
