= Maa Voori Maaraju =

- Poster
- Directed by: Kodi Ramakrishna
- Written by: Ganesh Patro (dialogues)
- Screenplay by: Kodi Ramakrishna
- Based on: Aranmanai Kili by Rajkiran
- Produced by: Kolli Venkateswara Rao; S. Adhi Reddy
- Starring: Arjun; Soundarya; Priya Raman
- Cinematography: Mohan Chand M
- Edited by: Nandamuri Hari
- Music by: Raj–Koti
- Production company: Amma Art Creations
- Release date: 19 August 1994
- Country: India
- Language: Telugu

Maa Voori Maaraju (transl. King of our Village) is a 1994 Indian Telugu-language romantic drama film directed and co-written by Kodi Ramakrishna and starring Arjun, Soundarya and Priya Raman in her Telugu debut. It is a remake of the Tamil-language film Aranmanai Kili (1993).

== Cast ==
- Arjun as Suribabu
- Soundarya as Satyavathi
- Priya Raman as Janaki
- Sujatha
- Sudha
- Silk Smitha
- Ananth
- Juttu Narasimham

== Soundtrack ==
The music was composed by Raj–Koti.

Track listing
No.	Title	Singer(s)	Length
1.	"Thakadheemtha"	S. P. Balasubrahmanyam	5:06
2.	"Amma Nuvvokkasari"	S. P. Balasubrahmanyam	5:00
3.	"Gangalanti"	S. P. Balasubrahmanyam	5:27
4.	"Sangathi Cheppeai"	K. S. Chithra, S. P. Balasubrahmanyam	4:54
5.	"Edem Daruvuro"	Mano, Radhika	4:44
6.	"Abbayo Andalanni"	S. P. Balasubrahmanyam	5:16
Total length:			30:27

== Reception ==
A critic from Zamin Ryot wrote that dialogue writer Ganesh Patro is a genius who can convey big feelings in small sentences.
