= Pasamulla Pandiyare =

- Title card
- Directed by: T. P. Gajendran
- Screenplay by: Sangili Murugan
- Story by: P. Kalaimani
- Produced by: Kalyani Murugan
- Starring: Rajkiran; Meena; Roja
- Cinematography: K. S. Selvaraj
- Edited by: Ganesh Kumar
- Music by: Deva
- Production company: Meenakshi Arts
- Release date: 6 June 1997
- Country: India
- Language: Tamil

Pasamulla Pandiyare is a 1997 Indian Tamil-language action drama film directed by T. P. Gajendran and produced by Kalyani Murugan. The film stars Rajkiran, Meena, and Roja, while M. N. Nambiar, Nizhalgal Ravi, Alex, Sangili Murugan, Vadivelu, and Senthil play supporting roles. It was released on 6 June 1997.

== Plot ==
Pandiyar is a genuine person adopted by Nesamani's family. The family migrates to Malaysia, leaving the house under Pandiyar and other properties under Eswaramoorthi. Vellayamma is a talented palm reader who falls for Pandiyar. Nesamani's daughter Dhanalakshmi returns to India with her husband Nagaraja and daughter Revathi. Revathi falls in love with Pandiyar. Vellayamma reads Dhanalakshmi's palm and finds her untold secret story. Then, Nagaraja kills Vellayamma's associates with Eswaramoorthi, and the innocent man Pandiyar gets arrested for Vellayamma's murder. The rest of the story revolves around how Pandiyar proves his innocence in court.

== Cast ==
- Rajkiran as Pandiyar
- Meena as Vellayamma
- Roja as Revathi
- M. N. Nambiar as Nesamani
- Nizhalgal Ravi as Nagaraja
- Alex as Eswaramoorthi
- Sangili Murugan as Isakki, Pandiyar's father
- Vadivelu as Kuppusamy
- Senthil as Appusamy
- Mahanadi Shankar
- Kovai Sarala
- Fathima Babu
- Monica
- Idichapuli Selvaraj
- Kullamani
- K. K. Soundar
- Peeli Sivam
- Jyothi Lakshmi in a special appearance
- V. Gopalakrishnan in a guest appearance
- Ram Lakshman (stunt choreographers) as chained mental patients

== Production ==
The film saw Rajkiran pairing with Meena for second time after En Rasavin Manasile.

== Soundtrack ==
The soundtrack was composed by Deva.

Song	Singers	Lyrics	Length
"Discovery Channel"	Anuradha Sriram	Palani Bharathi	05:12
"Kaiya Idhu"	Anuradha Sriram, Deva	Vairamuthu	04:49
"Oh Lovely"	Sujatha, Mano	Palani Bharathi	05:18
"Pasamulla Pandiyare"	P. Unnikrishnan	Vairamuthu	05:08
"Rukku Rukku"	Anuradha Sriram, Bharathi	Vairamuthu	05:01
"Veeranthan"	Swarnalatha , Sujatha mohan	Vaali	04:40

== Reception ==
Ji of Kalki felt it was hard that the story does not move until the intermission, and then the plot which moves becomes difficult, yet he praised Fathima Babu's performance, saying she manages but was critical of her makeup, he dismissed Deva's music as nothing great. He concluded the review by saying Gajendran could have kept at least four special features in the film. The film failed at box-office as Gajendran felt the films of Rajkiran which released one after the other created anticipation among audience and he erred by choosing an ordinary story for him.
