= Valivalam =

Town in Tamil Nadu, India

Coordinates: 10°39′N 79°42′E

Valivalam is a small town in Nagapattinam district, Tamil Nadu, India.

Nature-made forests are growing within Valivalam spearheaded by pasumai valivalam amaippu (environmental volunteers group) in July 2019 with 2500+ trees of 70-75 variety of species in nearly 20000 sq.ft of formerly degraded land by using akira miyawakki method, especially majority of fruit bearing species to attract birds. It is an emerging eco-tourism spot and botanical study centre in the district.

== Facilities ==
Valivalam has a hospital, supermarket, wedding hall, furniture mall, browsing center and a police station. Valivalam Desikar higher secondary school was founded in 1959 this school was the only scope of good education near locality There is also Valivalam Desikar polytechnic college in Nagappatinam. there is also a school called SRI Manika Vinayagar hosting up to class 5.

The Manathunai Nathar Temple in Valibalam is built on a peninsula. In 1991 the Tamil movie Vaa Arugil Vaa was filmed in Valivalam. Agriculture is the main profession here.
