= Tamil Nadu State Film Award for Best Character Artiste (Male) =

Indian film award

The Tamil Nadu State Film Award for Best Character Artiste (Male) is given by the state government as part of its annual Tamil Nadu State Film Awards for Tamil (Kollywood) films. The award in this category was first given in 1968 and stopped after 1970. It resumed in 2000.

== The list ==
Here is a list of the award winners and the films for which they won.

Year	Actor	Film	Ref
1968	T. S. Balaiah	Thillaanaa Mohanambal	
1969	Major Sundarrajan	Deiva Magan	
1970	R. Muthuraman	Nilave Nee Saatchi	
2000	Jayaram	Thenali	
2001	Rajkiran	Pandavar Bhoomi; Nandhaa	
2002	Janagaraj	King	
2003	Alex	Kovilpatti Veeralakshmi	
2004	Radharavi	Oru Murai Sollividu	
2005	Rajkiran	Sandakozhi	
2006	Nassar	Em Magan	
2007	M. S. Baskar	Mozhi	
2008	Prakash Raj	Abhiyum Naanum	
2009	Sharath Babu	Malayan	
2010	Samuthirakani	Eesan	
2011	Nassar	Deiva Thirumagal	
2012	Narain	Manam Kothi Paravai	
2013	Jayaprakash	Pannaiyarum Padminiyum	
2014	Nassar	Kaaviya Thalaivan	
2015	Thalaivasal Vijay	Apoorva Mahaan	
2016	R. Parthiban	Maaveeran Kittu	
2017	Bose Venkat	Theeran Adhigaaram Ondru; Kavan	
2018	Ameer Sultan	Vada Chennai	
2019	Prakash Raj	Asuran	
2020	Karunas	Soorarai Pottru	
2021	K. Manikandan	Jai Bhim	
2022	Bose Venkat	Taanakkaran	

== See also ==
- Tamil cinema
- Cinema of India
