= Ravanan (1994 film) =

- Directed by: E. Ramdoss
- Written by: E. Ramdoss
- Produced by: J. A. Mohamed Ali
- Starring: Mansoor Ali Khan; Ahana
- Cinematography: B. R. Vijayalakshmi
- Edited by: K. M. P. Kumar
- Music by: A. K. Vasagan
- Production company: Raj Kennedy Films
- Release date: 14 January 1994
- Running time: 105 minutes
- Country: India
- Language: Tamil

Ravanan is a 1994 Indian Tamil language film directed by E. Ramdoss. The film stars Mansoor Ali Khan and Ahana, with Manorama, R. Sundarrajan, Rajesh, Vadivukkarasi, Pandu, Thyagu and B. Ashokarajan playing supporting roles. It was released on 14 January 1994.

== Plot ==
Ravanan is a short-tempered farmer who lives with his mother and his little sister. He is known for punishing the villagers and even severely punished his own father one day. His father then felt resentful towards him since that day and decided to live alone.

Meena, who comes from the city, is the daughter of a wealthy villager. Being an arrogant and spoiled girl, Meena often quarrels with Ravanan. The fight becomes worse when Meena stops Uma's timed wedding. The angry Ravanan kidnaps Meena and sequesters her in his farm. Ashokarajan, a wealthy landlord and an evil womanizer, enters in their conflict. What transpires next forms the rest of the story.

== Cast ==
- Mansoor Ali Khan as Ravanan
- Ahana as Meena
- Manorama as Ravanan's mother
- R. Sundarrajan as Ravanan's father
- Rajesh as Meena's father
- Vadivukkarasi as Kannamma
- Pandu
- Thyagu as Aadhikesavan
- B. Ashokarajan as Ashokarajan
- Sangita Madhavan Nair as Uma
- Vichithra as Sundari
- Sharmili
- Nellai Siva as Punnakku
- Dinesh Kumar
- Ilavarasu
- Singamuthu
- Sellamathan
- TKS Natarajan
- Durai Ramachandran
- Nirmala
- Shalini
- Sindhu
- Bonda Mani
- Baboos

Cameo appearance in a song 'Velicham Poranthachu' (archival footage)

- E. Ramdoss
- Yaar Kannan
- Rajkiran
- K. S. Ravikumar
- R. Parthiban
- T. Rajendar
- Prashanth
- Sathyaraj
- Manivannan
- Balu Anand
- S. S. Chandran

== Soundtrack ==
The music was composed by A. K. Vasagan, with lyrics written by Kalidasan.

Song	Duration
"Velicham Poranthachu"	4:13
"Oorukkelam Kettavanda"	3:17
"Poo Piriyathu"	3:44
"Kalyana Ponna"	4:01
"Aandhavanin"	5:29

== Reception ==
K. Vijiyan of New Straits Times wrote, "Ravanan is entertaining - against all expectations".
