= Aranmanai Kili =

1993 film by Rajkiran

- Theatrical release poster
- Directed by: Rajkiran
- Written by: Rajkiran
- Produced by: Rajkiran
- Starring: Rajkiran; Ahana; Gayathri
- Cinematography: Kichas
- Edited by: L. Kesavan
- Music by: Ilaiyaraaja
- Production company: Red Sun Art Creations
- Release date: 16 April 1993
- Country: India
- Language: Tamil

Aranmanai Kili (transl. Palatial parrot) is a 1993 Indian Tamil-language romantic drama film written, produced and directed by Rajkiran in his directorial debut. He also stars alongside Ahana and Gayathri. The film was released on 16 April 1993. It was remade in Telugu as Maa Voori Maaraju (1994), and in Kannada as Neelakanta (2006).

== Plot ==
Raasaiyya is a servant working for a rich family whose granddaughter, Poongodi, secretly loves him. When Chellamma, a poor girl, is kidnapped and forced into prostitution, Raasaiyya rescues her and brings her to his village. The rest of the story is about what fate has in store for the three of them.

== Cast ==
- Rajkiran as Raasaiyya
- Ahana as Poongodi
- Gayathri as Chellamma
- Vadivelu as Kaththayya
- C. R. Vijayakumari as Raasaiya's mother
- Sangili Murugan as Raasaiya's father
- Ilavarasi as Poongodi's mother
- V. Nambirajan as Poongodi's uncle
- Kanal Kannan as Henchman (special appearance)

== Production ==
Aranmanai Kili is the directorial debut of Rajkiran who also produced the film, wrote the script and starred as the male lead. The film is the acting debut for Ahana and Gayathri; both were chosen from over 300 girls who auditioned. Cinematography was handled by Kichas. The filming of the song "Adi Poonguyile" suffered significant delays due to difficulties in finding a location with the required settings, including "green grass, mountains, and waterfalls". It was also affected by the makers wanting to wait for the perfect weather as the song sequence required heavy rain. The filming was held at Karaikudi.

== Soundtrack ==
The soundtrack was composed by Ilaiyaraaja. Though the soundtrack has nine songs, only seven feature onscreen. The song "En Thaayenum" is set in Mayamalavagowla raga.

Track listing
Title	Singer(s)	Lyrics	Length
"Amman Kovil"	Swarnalatha, Minmini	Muthulingam	5:01
"Adi Poonguyile"	Mano, Minmini	Vaali	5:07
"Ramera Ninakkum"	Ilaiyaraaja	Piraisoodan	3:55
"Vaanmathiye"	S. Janaki	Vaali	5:05
"Nattu Vacha Roja"	P. Susheela	Piraisoodan	5:08
"Raasave Unnai Vida"	S. Janaki	Vaali	4:28
"Idhayame Poguthey"	Krishnamoorthy	Ponnadiyaan	4:59
"Rathiriyil Paadum"	Arunmozhi, Minmini, Malaysia Vasudevan	Vaali	4:53
"En Thaayenum Koil"	Ilaiyaraaja	Ponnadiyaan	4:53

== Release and reception ==
Aranmanai Kili was released on 16 April 1993. Malini Mannath of The Indian Express felt that, of the seven songs featuring onscreen, only two were memorable, and "The film-maker reportedly delayed the shooting as he had not found a suitable heroine. He could have waited a little longer". K. Vijian of New Straits Times wrote "Go and watch this movie with an open mind. You may then able to enjoy Aranmanai Kili". C. R. K. of Kalki wrote that the incidents and comedic sequences in the film were natural without any kind of fiction.
