= The City (1994 film) =

- Directed by: I. V. Sasi
- Screenplay by: T. Damodaran
- Story by: Priyadarsan
- Produced by: G. P. Vijayakumar
- Starring: Suresh Gopi; Urvashi; Lalu Alex; Ratheesh; Ahana
- Cinematography: Ravi K. Chandran
- Edited by: K. Narayanan
- Music by: Songs: Johnson; Background score: S. P. Venkatesh
- Production company: Seven Arts
- Distributed by: Seven Arts Release
- Release date: 1994
- Country: India
- Language: Malayalam

The City is a 1994 Indian Malayalam-language action film directed by I. V. Sasi and written by T. Damodaran from a story by Priyadarsan. The cast includes Suresh Gopi, Urvashi, Lalu Alex, Ratheesh, Ahana and Anandaraj.

== Plot ==
Assistant superintendent of police Raviprasad gets involved with a drug mafia when he tries to stop them.

== Cast ==
- Suresh Gopi as A.S.P Raviprasad IPS
- Urvashi as Jyothi
- Ahana as Priya
- Anandaraj as Raja
- Ratheesh as Spark Jayadevan
- Kakka Ravi as M.P Sudhakaran
- Lalu Alex as D.G.P Chandrasekharan Nair IPS
- Sindhuja as Maria Begum
- Raveendran as Singer
- Bindhu Panicker as Sumathi
- Delhi Ganesh as Commissioner Muthulingam IPS
- Sridevi as Manju
- Kalyan Kumar as R. S. Pandiyan
- Sathyapriya as Thangamani
- Kitty as Sharma
- Vyjayanthi as Radhamani
- Kuthiravattam Pappu as Driver Govindan
- Rajesh as C.I Durai
- Bobby Kottarakkara as Basheer
- Raj Chander as Sharath Pandian
- Dhadha Muthukumar as Rocky
