= Vai Pandal =

- Title card
- Directed by: Rama Narayanan
- Starring: Mohan; Urvashi
- Music by: Shankar–Ganesh
- Release date: 16 November 1984
- Country: India
- Language: Tamil

Vai Pandal (transl. Bombast) is a 1984 Indian Tamil-language comedy film directed by Rama Narayanan, starring Mohan and Urvashi. It was released on 16 November 1984.

== Cast ==
- Mohan
- Urvashi
- Y. G. Mahendran
- Vanitha
- Senthamarai
- V. Gopalakrishnan
- Radha Ravi
- S. S. Chandran
- Loose Mohan
- Gandhimathi

== Soundtrack ==
The music was composed by Shankar–Ganesh.

Track listing
No.	Title	Lyrics	Singer(s)	Length
1.	"Pattu Chattai"	Vairamuthu	Malaysia Vasudevan, P. Susheela
2.	"Nallakalam Pirakkirathu"	Vaali	Vivek Sarathi, S. P. Sailaja, Chorus
3.	"Top Takkar"	Vaali	S. P. Sailaja
4.	"Panangattu Nari"	Vaali	S. P. Sailaja, Chorus
