= Ellame En Rasathan =

1995 Indian film by Rajkiran

- Poster
- Directed by: Rajkiran
- Written by: Rajkiran
- Produced by: Rajkiran
- Starring: Rajkiran; Sangita; Roopa Sree
- Cinematography: B. S. Lokanath
- Edited by: L. Kesavan; R. M. Kuppuraj
- Music by: Ilaiyaraaja
- Production company: Red Sun Art Creations
- Release date: 14 April 1995
- Running time: 160 minutes
- Country: India
- Language: Tamil

Ellame En Rasathan (transl. Everything is my Beloved man) is a 1995 Indian Tamil-language drama film written, produced and directed by Rajkiran. The film stars him, Sangita and Roopa Sree. It was released on 14 April 1995 and emerged a box-office hit. The film was remade in Telugu as Soggadi Pellam (1996) and in Kannada as Marthanda (1998).

== Plot ==
Singarasu comes to a remote village with his daughter to look for his wife's murderer, Mookaiyan, a murder that only his daughter witnessed. Mookaiyan follows them to kill the witness. Meanwhile, the daughter of the village chief Chinna Raani falls in love with Singarasu.

In the past, Singarasu was the gram panchayat president: he was a rough and irresponsible man who spent a lot of time playing rummy, but he was a kind-hearted man. The rowdy Mookaiyan killed a newborn girl in the other village and supported female infanticide. Later, Singarasu clashed with the other village's chief Ayya for supporting this practice. To punish Ayya, Singarasu kidnapped his daughter Raani and sequestered her in his house. Ayya then called the police to arrest the murderer Mookaiyan and Mookaiyan was sent to jail. Thereafter, Raani fell in love with Singarasu and refused to go back home. Singarasu married Raani but he was still an irresponsible man. Later, Singarasu decided to work hard and he became a respected man in the village. Upon his release from the jail, Mookaiyan decided to take revenge on Singarasu so he murdered his innocent wife Raani.

Back to the present, Singarasu clearly objects to wed Chinna Raani and he is determined to punish the heartless Mookaiyan. What transpires later forms the crux of the story.

== Cast ==
- Rajkiran as Singarasu
- Sangita as Raani
- Baby Neethu Praveen as Singarasu (Rajkiran) daughter.
- Roopa Sree as Chinna Raani
- Vadivelu as Vadivelu
- R. Sundarrajan
- K. R. Vijaya as Singarasu's grandmother
- Vittal Rao as Ayya
- Sooriyan as Mookaiyan
- Periya Karuppu Thevar
- Vellai Subbaiah
- Kollangudi Karuppayee
- Bayilvan Ranganathan
- Manohar
- Baby Neethu Praveen as Singarasu's daughter
- Baby Anusha as Singarasu's daughter
- Kanal Kannan as Rogue (special appearance)

== Production ==
Rajkiran initially planned for the film to revolve around female infanticide; however after he came to know Karuthamma revolving around the same theme got released, he made changes to the script.

== Soundtrack ==
The music was composed by Ilaiyaraaja. The song "Ettana Iruntha" is the playback singing debut of Vadivelu.

Song	Singer(s)	Lyrics	Length
"Azhagaana Mancha Pura"	Mano, S. Janaki	Vaali	5:03
"Ettana Iruntha"	Vadivelu	Ponnadiyan	4:55
"Oru Santhana Kaattu"	S. Janaki, Ilaiyaraaja	Vaali	5:29
"Thoothukudi Muthu"	Ashalatha, Srilekha	Vaali	5:07
"Veenaikku Veenai"	Ilaiyaraaja	Pulamaipithan	5:05

== Reception ==
K. Vijiyan of New Straits Times wrote, "[Ellame En Rasathan] has a rather slow beginning and takes too much time coming to the point but [..] there is a following for this type of family-oriented movie". R. P. R. of Kalki reviewed the film more positively, praising Ilaiyaraaja's music and the absence of obscene comedy, dances and disgusting events.
