= Mannukku Mariyadhai =

- Directed by: T. R. Vijayan
- Written by: Parthibaraman (dialogues)
- Screenplay by: T. R. Vijayan
- Story by: G. Jayapal; K. M. P Samy
- Produced by: J. Shanmugam; A. Sankunthala; V. L. Gopal
- Starring: Vignesh; Sanghavi
- Cinematography: M. S. Sagadevan
- Edited by: K. Ganesh
- Music by: Devadevan
- Production company: J. K. S. Films
- Release date: 22 September 1995
- Running time: 110 minutes
- Country: India
- Language: Tamil

Mannukku Mariyadhai (transl. Respect for the soil) is a 1995 Indian Tamil language drama film directed by T. R. Vijayan. The film stars Vignesh and Sanghavi, with R. P. Viswam, Kavitha, Uday Prakash, Chinni Jayanth, newcomer Jayaprabhu, Vandhana and Mandai Seenu playing supporting roles. It was released on 22 September 1995.

== Plot ==
Thupakki Gounder (R. P. Viswam) is a ruthless village chief and a greedy moneylender, and every villager is afraid of him and his henchmen. Thupakki Gounder is married to Lakshmi (Kavitha), and they have a son (Uday Prakash) who is a womanizer and a daughter Bhavani (Sanghavi) who is studying in the city. He has also an illegitimate son Nagarajan (Jayaprabhu) who works as a blacksmith and Nagarajan wants his father to confess that he is his son in front of the villagers.

Pandian (Vignesh), an angry young man and a jobless graduate, gives tuition to the uneducated villagers which annoy Thupakki Gounder. But beyond that, Pandian spends time with his jobless friends. Pandian lives with his father Samikannu (Samikannu) and his widow sister Kalyani (Vandhana). Her husband died after two days of marriage, nobody wants to marry her after this tragedy.

Bhavani arrives from the city, her father insisted to come in their village. He wants his daughter to provide lessons for the uneducated villagers. Her lessons become way more popular among the villagers than Pandian's lessons. After initial fights between Pandian and Bhavani, both fall in love. What transpires next forms the rest of the story.

== Cast ==
- Vignesh as Pandian
- Sanghavi as Bhavani
- R. P. Viswam as Thupakki Gounder
- Kavitha as Lakshmi
- Uday Prakash
- Chinni Jayanth as Azhagu
- Jayaprabhu as Nagarajan
- Vandhana as Kalyani
- Mandai Seenu as Mandai
- Kumarimuthu
- Loose Mohan
- Idichapuli Selvaraj
- Theni Kunjarammal
- Pasi Narayanan
- Samikannu as Samikannu
- Kavithasri as Padmavati
- Vennila as Rasathi
- K. Kannan
- Baba Bhaskar
- Dharapuram Rajendran
- Dharapuram V. S. Arumugam

== Soundtrack ==
The soundtrack was composed by Devadevan, with lyrics written by Piraisoodan, Udhaya Bharathi, Aruvi Radha, Anbuthurai and Mohana Priyan.

Song	Singer(s)	Duration
"Ponn Manne"	Mano, K. S. Chithra	4:56
"Aathi Sakthi"	Malaysia Vasudevan, Swarnalatha	4:26
"Poo Malaiyo"	Mano, K. S. Chithra	4:55
"Alamaram Pole"	K. J. Yesudas	5:22
"Padhaiyileh"	Malaysia Vasudevan	4:52
"Raathiri Enum"	K. S. Chithra	4:31
