= Sivan (film) =

1999 film by Velu Prabhakaran

- Title card
- Directed by: Velu Prabhakaran
- Written by: Velu Prabhakaran
- Produced by: J. Paramasivam; Y. J. Sathish
- Starring: Arun Pandian; Napoleon; Radhika; Swathi; Ahana
- Cinematography: Velu Prabhakaran
- Edited by: V. Chidambaram
- Music by: Adithyan
- Production company: V. J. Combines
- Release date: 26 November 1999
- Running time: 100 minutes
- Country: India
- Language: Tamil

Sivan (/sivən/) is a 1999 Indian Tamil-language science fiction action film written and directed by Velu Prabhakaran. The film stars Arun Pandian, Napoleon, Radhika, Swathi and Ahana. It was released on 26 November 1999. The film is heavily inspired by the American film RoboCop.

== Plot ==
The film starts with a terrorist group entering in an Indian military ammunition depot based in Delhi. They kill all the guards and try to steal the nuclear weapons in the depot, but the terrorist group accidentally drops one of the weapons causing a chemical attack. The number of terrorist attacks resulting in India has increased over the last few months. In the context of the fight against terrorism, the Government suspects that the terrorist group is from Tamil Nadu. Alex, an honest police ACP of Chennai, is charged to dismantle the terrorist infrastructure. Alex is married to Ahana and lives with his infant daughter and mother.

Meanwhile, Murugan is a poor car mechanic living with his mother and sister Meenakshi. His cousin Shenbagam is in love with him, but Murugan does not want to get married until his sister will finish her studies and will get married. One day, Alex's police car breaks down in a lost corner. Murugan, who is just passing by, helps Alex to repair his car. When Alex pays Murugan for his work, Murugan refuses to take the money because he respects the police department who works hard for the people and the nation. So Alex gives his visiting card if he will need help in the near future.

One day, Alex arrests a terrorist who had gunpowder in his car. That night, the terrorist leader threatens him over the phone, but Alex refuses to drop the case and vows to arrest him. Soon, Alex suspects Jupiter, a wealthy philanthropist and respected man in the society, to be the leader of the terrorist group. Alex decides to sneak into Jupiter's warehouse alone. In the meantime, Alex's family is killed by the Jupiter's henchmen. In the warehouse, Alex is caught by Jupiter and Alex's best friend, who betrays him, the terrorists torture Alex, brutally gunning him down before Jupiter personally executes him.

Sivagami, an honest police sub-inspector and Alex's ex-partner, decides to take charge of the case. Meanwhile, scientists who succeeded in resurrecting death animals, decides to resurrect Alex. They exhume Alex's body, replace most of his body with cybernetics, leaving his human brain, and he becomes Sivan. Later, Murugan's sister was gang-raped and killed, Murugan's mother dies of a heart attack after hearing that news. Murugan finally tracks the gang members down and kills them all except the gang leader Uday who managed to escape. Sivan, assigned to Alex's former city, proceeds to efficiently rid the streets of crime. When Sivagami talks to him, Sivan recognises her, but there's not one trace of emotions in him. One day, Murugan begs Alex to punish the person who raped his sister, but Alex doesn't recognise him.

Later, Murugan kills Uday, who was, in fact, part of Jupiter's terrorist group. Uday's friend then kills his lover, and Murugan kills him in return. Sivan finally discovers his true identity and goes to Jupiter's warehouse to kill all the terrorists. Murugan decides to assist Sivan for this mission, and Sivan finally executes Jupiter.

== Cast ==
- Arun Pandian as ACP Alex IPS / Sivan
- Napoleon as Murugan
- Radhika as Sivagami
- Swathi as Shenbagam
- Ahana as Ahana, Alex's wife
- Naga Kannan as Jupiter
- Kalpana as Meenakshi, Murugan's sister
- Dubbing Janaki as Murugan's mother
- Padmini
- Pattinapakkam Jayaram as Terrorist
- Rajkumar as Terrorist
- Kishore as Terrorist
- Kundrathur Babu as Terrorist
- Idichapuli Selvaraj
- King Kong as Nattu
- Uday Prakash as Uday
- Minmini Poochigal Raju
- Radha Bai
- Kalyan in a special appearance
- Rani in a special appearance
- Alphonsa in a special appearance

== Soundtrack ==
The soundtrack was composed by Adithyan.

Song	Singer(s)	Lyrics	Duration
"Egypt Nattu Cleopatra"	Adithyan, Swarnalatha	Vaali	5:08
"Ooh Enn Pennmaiyai"	Swarnalatha	Vaasan	4:57
"Pesarat Pesarat"	Malgudi Subha	Vaasan	4:48
"Rukkuthan Rukkuthan"	Mano, Malgudi Subha	Vaali	3:51
"Uthere Kili"	Gopal Sharma, Devie Neithiyar	Vaali	4:30
