= Uday Prakash (actor) =

Indian actor (1964–2004)

- Screenshot of Uday Prakash from the film Chinna Thambi
- Born: Manikandan; June 19, 1964; Ooty, Tamil Nadu, India
- Died: August 18, 2004 (aged 40); Chennai, Tamil Nadu, India
- Occupation: Actor

Uday Prakash (June 19, 1964 – August 18, 2004) was an Indian actor who starred in Tamil and Telugu films. He was a football player (team captain) at Sacred Heart College, Tirupattur.

== Career ==
Uday Prakash became famous as he acted in a very important role in Telugu blockbuster Karthavyam starring Vijayashanti. The film also gave him the much boost in Tamil as well, when it was dubbed as Vyjayanthi IPS. Soon he was cast as one of the 3 brothers of Khushbu in Chinna Thambi which also became a blockbuster.

== Death ==
Uday Prakash had the habit of drinking which made his downfall as he lost many opportunities. He had left Chennai due to mounting debts with no work. He was later spotted living in a hut as a hermit along with an old lady who fed him. With the media writing about him the Nadigar Sangham took the responsibility to rehabilitate him. Actor Sarath Kumar gave him an opportunity again in his film Diwan. Uday Prakash told the media that he had kicked the habit of drinking and was looking forward to his new life, but he went back to his old ways. Later he was admitted to the hospital for liver problem. Director P. Vasu' s brother had arranged the money for the treatment. But Uday Prakash left the hospital and reached Nadigar Sangham in a drunken state and collapsed and later died. Napoleon and P Vasu made arrangements for the actor's body to be sent to his birthplace, Ooty.

== Partial filmography ==
Year	Film	Role	Language	Notes
1989	Varusham Padhinaaru		Tamil	
1990	Kartavyam		Telugu	
1990	Pudhu Pudhu Ragangal		Tamil	
1991	Anbu Sangili	Viswanath	Tamil	
1991	Chinna Thambi		Tamil	
1991	Idhaya Vaasal		Tamil	
1991	Kizhakku Karai		Tamil	
1992	Mannan		Tamil	
1992	Idhu Namma Bhoomi		Tamil	
1992	Samundi		Tamil	
1992	Peddarikam		Telugu	
1993	Uzhaippali		Tamil	
1993	Ponnumani		Tamil	
1993	Band Master		Tamil	
1993	Kattabomman	Rajappa	Tamil	
1993	Kathirukka Neramillai	Ajith	Tamil	
1993	Inspector Jhansi	Kiran	Telugu	
1993	Chinna Jameen		Tamil	
1993	Prathap		Tamil	
1993	Rajadhi Raja Raja Kulothunga...		Tamil	
1993	Manavarali Pelli		Telugu	
1994	Sathyavan	Gopi	Tamil	
1994	Veera		Tamil	
1994	Senthamizh Selvan		Tamil	
1994	Seeman		Tamil	
1995	Anbu Magan		Tamil	
1995	Mannukku Mariyadhai		Tamil	
1996	Mettukudi		Tamil	
1996	Mr. Romeo		Tamil	
1996	Vetri Vinayagar		Tamil	
1997	Arasiyal	Ramkumar	Tamil	
1997	Periya Thambi	Thangarasu	Tamil	
1997	Pudhayal	Madhu	Tamil	
1997	Thadayam	Jeeva	Tamil	
1999	Sivan	Uday	Tamil	
1999	Ethirum Pudhirum	Police inspector	Tamil	
2003	Diwan	Chandran	Tamil	
2003	Kadhal Kirukkan	Kavidhangel	Tamil	
2004	Jaisurya		Tamil	
2004	Super Da		Tamil	
