= Oorellaam Un Paattu =

- Poster
- Directed by: Siraj
- Written by: Siraj
- Produced by: Suresh Kanth
- Starring: Ramarajan; Vaidehi; Aishwarya
- Cinematography: B. S. Lokanath
- Edited by: L. Kesavan
- Music by: Ilaiyaraaja
- Production company: Ayyanars Cine Arts
- Release date: 16 July 1991
- Country: India
- Language: Tamil

Oorellaam Un Paattu (transl. Your song is playing throughout the town) is a 1991 Indian Tamil-language film directed by Siraj, starring Ramarajan, Vaidehi and Aishwarya. The film was released on 16 July 1991.

== Plot ==
Agaramuthan(Ramarajan)is a kind-hearted folk singer who usually participates in village functions alongside his group. He led his drama troupe, Sangaradas Swamigal, which consisted of twelve members. They travel and perform dramas around the villages surrounding Madurai, making ends meet. Agaramuthan is so famous for his magnetic voice and folk singing style, which has given him a respectful image among the people.

They conducted a drama near a village in Madurai, and there Agaramuthan comes across a girl named Abirami(Vaidehi) who lives opposite his house. Abirami is a mischievous girl and the stepdaughter of the village goon, whom every person in the village is afraid of.

Parallel narration is the comedy track of (Goundamani) and (Senthil), drama troupe members.

After some turns of events, Abirami expressed his feelings to Agarmuthan, to which he turned down. Agaramuthan replied to Abirami that he is already married to someone else. To everyone's shock, the movie dives into a flashback.

A few years ago, Agaramuthan was an orphan singer in a temple at Perumalpuram village. A girl named Shanti(Aishwarya), the daughter of the rich landlord, likes the magnetic voice of Agaramuthan just by hearing it randomly. When she finds him near the temple, Shanti's father misunderstands that she is in love with him. So, he orders to kill Agaramuthan as he thinks it will defame his caste. When the goons arrive, they mistakenly kill Sahanti instead of him. Before dying, Shanti reveals that she likes his song only, and tricked the goons to save Agaramuthan; and Shanti promised him that her soul will follow whenever he sings. In return, Agaramuthan marries Shanti by tying the nuptial cord to her corpse. Shanti's father was arrested by the police, and Agaramuthan built a memorial in the name of the deceased Shanti and pays respect to her on every Friday to date.

Back in the present, Abirami shows much more love for Agaramuthan and appreciates his sacrifice. When Abirami's stepfather arranges her marriage with a lunatic, Agaramuthan saves her. Shanti's father returned from prison punishment, feels sorry for what he did to her daughter, and he wants Abirami and Agaramuthan to be married. Finally, Agaramuthan accepted Abirami's love, and both of them were united.

== Cast ==
- Ramarajan as Agaramuthan a.k.a Agaramuthu
- Vaidehi as Abhirami
- Aishwarya as Santhi
- Senthil
- Goundamani
- Rambo Rajkumar
- Karuppu Subbiah
- Vinu Chakravarthy
- Rajeev
- Gandhimathi
- Periya Karuppu Thevar
- Kullamani

== Soundtrack ==
The soundtrack was composed by Ilaiyaraaja, with lyrics by Vaali and Piraisoodan. The song "Thom Thom" is based on Ramapriya raga.

Track listing
| No. | Title | Lyrics | Singer(s) | Length |
|---|---|---|---|---|
| 1. | "Oorellam Un Paatu Thaan" (female) | Vaali | Swarnalatha |
| 2. | "Oorellam Un Paatu Thaan" (male) | Vaali | K. J. Yesudas |
| 3. | "Noorandu Vazhum Kadhal" | Vaali | P. Jayachandran |
| 4. | "Thom Thom Ena" | Piraisoodan | K. J. Yesudas |
| 5. | "Oorellam Un Paatu Thaan" | Vaali | Ilaiyaraaja |
| 6. | "Ooru Kettu Kedakuthu" | Vaali | Malaysia Vasudevan, Mano, Saibaba |
