= Enne Petha Raasa =

1989 film by Siraj

- Poster
- Directed by: Siraj
- Screenplay by: Siraj
- Story by: Rajkiran
- Produced by: Rajkiran
- Starring: Ramarajan; Rupini; Srividya; Vinu Chakravarthy
- Cinematography: P. Ganesapandian
- Edited by: L. Kesavan
- Music by: Ilaiyaraaja
- Production company: Red Sun Art Creations
- Release date: 27 January 1989
- Country: India
- Language: Tamil

Enne Petha Raasa is a 1989 Indian Tamil-language drama film directed by Siraj and produced by Rajkiran who is also credited for the story. The film stars Ramarajan, Rupini, Srividya and Vinu Chakravarthy. It was released on 27 January 1989.

== Plot ==
Raja is an angry youth who questions the wrongs around him in the village. He's in love with his cousin Lakshmi, but her father, Mayathevar, is hesitant to approve their relationship due to past family conflicts, when Raja's father had eloped with Kalyani, Mayathevar's sister. Kalyani wants her son Raja to marry Lakshmi, hoping to reunite the separated family. When Mayathevar learns that Lakshmi loves Raja too, he has a change of heart and arranges their engagement. However, Natarajan, a rich landlord and Mayathevar's uncle, wants Lakshmi to marry one of his sons. Natarajan speaks ill of Kalyani, causing Mayathevar to chase Raja's family away. Humiliated, Natarajan tries to force Lakshmi to marry his son, but Raja intervenes and fights them off.

To stop Raja from marrying Lakshmi, Natarajan brings a stage actor, Catherine, and frames Mayathevar for raping her, blackmailing him into marrying Lakshmi to Natarajan's son. Mayathevar calls off the wedding, citing the false allegations, and Raja distances himself from Lakshmi without revealing the truth. Believing Raja has moved on, Lakshmi attempts to take her own life but is rescued. Seeing her plight, Mayathevar promises to marry Lakshmi to Raja, despite Natarajan's threats. The night before, Mayathevar is seen leaving Catherine's house, and Raja discovers Catherine stabbed and dying. Raja removes the knife, but she dies soon, leading to Raja being arrested on charges of Catherine's murder. Raja asks Mayathevar not to reveal the truth, but Mayathevar dies of cardiac shock soon after. The villagers begin to suspect Raja had an affair with Catherine, and Kalyani believes Raja killed her.

Natarajan plots to take over Raja's family's properties and hires Veluchamy, Raja's paternal uncle, to buy them at a low price. He also arranges Lakshmi's marriage to Muthu, the theatre manager, which Kalyani accepts, unaware of Natarajan's true intentions. Raja is released from prison and returns to the village, where Natarajan's henchmen try to kill him. Raja subdues them and enters the village, only to learn that his father has died due to humiliation. Kalyani chases Raja away, and Lakshmi believes he's responsible for her father's death. Johnny, a mentally unstable henchman mistreated by Natarajan, is noticed by Natarajan offering flowers to Catherine's grave. Natarajan beats and buries him in a coffin near the grave. Raja rescues Johnny with a cremator's help and takes him in.

Johnny reveals the truth about his sister, Catherine's past. Catherine had separated from Johnny and became a stage performer. Mayathevar had danced with her while intoxicated, and Natarajan used this to blackmail her into falsely accusing Mayathevar of rape, threatening to kill Johnny if she didn't comply. Catherine and Johnny planned to escape, but Natarajan abducted and killed her when she refused to follow his orders. Johnny witnessed the murder and was beaten by Natarajan's henchmen. Pretending to be mentally unstable to survive, Johnny waited for Raja's release to reveal the truth. Kalyani overhears the conversation and learns that Raja took the blame to protect Mayathevar's reputation. She apologizes for misunderstanding Raja and pleads with him not to seek revenge against Natarajan.

Raja beats up his paternal uncle Veluchamy, who reforms immediately. Natarajan motivates Muthu to abduct Lakshmi, and they kidnap her and Kalyani. Raja rushes to save them, leading to a road chase. Natarajan's son is ordered to abuse Lakshmi, despite her engagement to Muthu. Muthu reforms upon seeing Natarajan's true nature, but gets beaten. Raja engages in a fierce fight, saving Lakshmi and Kalyani. Johnny avenges his sister Catherine's death by stabbing and killing Natarajan, but dies from gunshot wounds. The film concludes with Raja and Lakshmi's wedding.

== Cast ==
- Ramarajan as Raja
- Rupini as Lakshmi
- Goundamani as Raja and Ganesan's father
- Vinu Chakravarthy as Mayathevar, Lakshmi's father
- Srividya as Kalyani, Raja and Ganesan's mother
- Sadhana in a guest appearance as Catherine
- Senthil as a theatre employee
- G. Srinivasan as Natarajan, Mayathevar's uncle
- Ilavarasan as Muthu
- Durga Sakthivel as Veluchamy, Raja's paternal uncle
- Krishnamoorthy as Natarajan's son
- Haja Sheriff as Ganesan, Raja's brother
- Bayilvan Ranganathan as Natarajan's son
- Rajkiran as Johnny, Catherine's brother
- Thayirvadai Desikan as Bayilvan, Mayathevar's sidekick
- Idichapuli Selvaraj as a troupe member
- Vellai Subbaiah as a villager
- Kovai Senthil as a villager
- Periya Karuppu Thevar as a cremator
- Karuppu Subbiah
- Chelladurai as a traditional healer
- Joker Thulasi

== Soundtrack ==
The music was composed by Ilaiyaraaja. The song "Petha Manasu" is set to the raga Charukesi.

Song	Singers	Lyrics	Length
"Sondham Ondrai"	Mano, K. S. Chithra	Piraisoodan	04:36
"Aasa Vacha Peraiyellam"	S. P. Sailaja	Gangai Amaran	04:37
"Malligai Poo Kathilile"	P. Susheela	Vaali	04:38
"Ellorakkum Nallavana"	Ilaiyaraaja	Ilaiyaraaja	03:56
"Sondham Ondrai"	Mano	Piraisoodan	04:36
"Aambalaiya Latchanama"	Mano	Gangai Amaran	04:53
"Petha Manasu"	Ilaiyaraaja	Ilaiyaraaja	04:35

== Critical reception ==
The Indian Express wrote, "Ennai Peththa Raja has an unmistakable rural flavour which despite its filmi turns keeps things going for it". P. S. S. of Kalki praised the acting, humour, characterisation and cinematography.
