= Aathma Bandhana =

- Lobby card
- Directed by: Srikanth Nahata
- Screenplay by: Srikanth Nahata
- Based on: Vaa Arugil Vaa
- Produced by: M. Rajagopal
- Starring: Shashikumar; Jayapradha; Vaishnavi; Doddanna
- Cinematography: D. V. Ramana
- Edited by: D. Venkatarathnam
- Music by: Rajan–Nagendra
- Production company: Sri Sarvashakthi Films
- Release date: 28 April 1992
- Running time: 131 minutes
- Country: India
- Language: Kannada

Aathma Bandhana is a 1992 Indian Kannada-language horror film directed by Srikanth Nahata and produced by M. Rajagopal. The film stars Shashikumar, Jayapradha and Vaishnavi.

The film is a revenge drama of a woman, played by Vaishnavi, who is mercilessly killed by her in-laws and her spirit enters into a doll. The doll takes revenge against each person involved in her murder. The film was a remake of Tamil film Vaa Arugil Vaa (1991) which itself was loosely inspired by the 1988 American film Child's Play. The film's music was composed by Rajan–Nagendra and cinematography is by D. V. Ramana.

== Cast ==
- Shashikumar
- Jayapradha
- Vaishnavi
- Doddanna
- Kaminidharan
- Thoogudeepa Srinivas
- Vajramuni
- Ramakrishna
- Mysore Lokesh
- Shani Mahadevappa

== Soundtrack ==
The music of the film was composed by Rajan–Nagendra with lyrics by Chi. Udaya Shankar.

Track listing
No.	Title	Singer(s)	Length
1.	"Rajeshwari Yogeshwari"	K. S. Chithra	4:59
2.	"Keluvararilla Nammanu"	K. S. Chithra	4:29
3.	"Hatthira Hatthira Nee"	K. S. Chithra, S. P. Balasubrahmanyam	4:29
4.	"Nanna Hrudayadalli"	K. S. Chithra, S. P. Balasubrahmanyam	4:46
5.	"Prema Yendare Yenu"	K. S. Chithra, S. P. Balasubrahmanyam	4:28
