= Nandhaa =

2001 Indian action drama film by Bala

- Poster
- Directed by: Bala
- Written by: Bala
- Produced by: Ganesh Raghu; Karthik Radhakrishnan; Venky Narayanan; Rajan Radhakrishnan
- Starring: Suriya; Rajkiran; Laila
- Cinematography: R. Rathnavelu
- Edited by: Suresh Urs
- Music by: Yuvan Shankar Raja
- Production company: Aparajeeth Films
- Release date: 14 November 2001
- Running time: 121 minutes
- Country: India
- Language: Tamil

Nandha is a 2001 Indian Tamil-language action drama film written and directed by Bala. The film stars Surya, Rajkiran, and Laila in the lead roles, while Saravanan, Rajshree, Sheela and Karunas (in his acting debut) play supporting roles. It is about the title character who, after serving time in a borstal, struggles to regain his mother's love and acceptance in society.

The music was composed by Yuvan Shankar Raja, with cinematography by R. Rathnavelu and editing by Suresh Urs. The film was executive produced by M. Kesavan Kutty and released on 14 November 2001, on Diwali.

== Plot ==
The plot opens with a woman and her two children, Nandhaa and Chitra, arriving at Rameswaram. Nandhaa, the elder child, is sent to a borstal for murdering his father after witnessing the latter's illicit affair with a prostitute and abuse towards Nandhaa's mother when she finds out about it. He returns home to his mother, who is deaf-mute, and Chitra, who are still in shock after what happened to their family.

Nandhaa decides to start life afresh by trying to study in a college. Because of his criminal record, he finds it difficult to get a seat in college. He then meets Periyavar, a rich disciplinarian who runs an arts and science college with an iron hand. His forefathers were kings of the Ramanathapuram kingdom and fell in line with the British. After independence, all of their palaces and titles were taken by India's government, but much of their material wealth was in their hands. He still thinks of himself as a guardian of people and helps many poor people. He even goes to the extent of providing justice when the law and police cannot or will not.

Periyavar develops a soft corner for Nandhaa and guides him like his own son. Kalyani, a Sri Lankan Tamil refugee from Jaffna, meets Nandhaa, and both fall in love. Meanwhile, Periyavar's son-in-law, Durai, asks Periyavar, who currently helps students at his college a lot, to aid an antisocial element, but Periyavar refuses outright. One of Periyavar's betraying sidekicks agrees to help Durai.

Periyavar falls ill and gets admitted to the hospital. Nandhaa stays around to look after his mentor and guide. Fearing what he has done might be out in the light, Durai pulls out Periyavar's oxygen tube in the hospital when Nandhaa is not around and blames Nandhaa for murdering his father-in-law. Nandhaa, having to deal with the pain of losing the only man who gave him a second chance to live, struggles with the fear of being convicted of murder once again and chooses to kill Durai on the court campus. However, the case is dismissed due to a lack of evidence. Nandhaa is eventually acquitted as there are no eyewitnesses to the murder.

After being acquitted of Durai's murder, Nandhaa returns home. However, his paranoid mother thinks that her son still has murder instincts, so she waits at home to feed him a meal, which she has poisoned for him. Nandhaa realizes the food is poisoned when he eats it but continues eating with the satisfaction that his mother is feeding him. Little does his mother know that it will mean her own death. Nandhaa collapses in his mother's lap, gradually succumbing to the poison that he has consumed. When his friend Lodukku Pandi, Chitra and Kalyani come to see what has happened, they realise that both Nandhaa and his mother are dead, and mourn them.

== Cast ==
- Surya as Nandha
  - Vinoth as young Nandha
- Rajkiran as Periyavar
- Laila as Kalyani
- Saravanan as Durai
- Karunas as Lodukku Pandi
- Rajasri as Nandha's mother
- Sheela as Chitra
- Thanjai Ramasamy as a villager
- Nandha Saravanan as a rowdy (uncredited)

== Production ==
The title role was initially offered to Ajith Kumar, who rejected the film citing that Bala had not fully developed the story and screenplay before narrating the terms to him. Ajith's departure meant that the film's proposed producer, Poornachandra Rao, also backed out. Suriya was selected as his replacement instead. The director tried to cast Sivaji Ganesan for a character role in the film, but his unavailability led to Rajkiran being cast. Laila was signed on as the lead actress. Because she portrays a Sri Lankan Tamil refugee, cinematographer R. Rathnavelu shot her scenes under "normal lighting" to depict her as less glamorous than some of her other Tamil films. It is the acting debut of Karunas, previously a singer and musician. Saravanan, who would later be known as Nandha Saravanan made his debut through this film.

The role required Suriya to undergo physical change, so production was delayed until Suriya had finished filming for Uyirile Kalanthathu (2000) and Friends (2001). The first look of the film created media anticipation, with both Suriya and Rajkiran sporting looks which they had not portrayed before. Post-release, Suriya stated, "when Nandha happened, everything changed. I became a serious actor, and director Bala instilled in me the discipline to work without committing errors." In an interview, Bala mentioned that the Malayalam film Thaniyavarthanam's climax inspired him a lot and based on this climax, the story of Nandhaa was written backwards.

== Soundtrack ==
The soundtrack was composed by Yuvan Shankar Raja. It was released on 21 October 2001 at Hotel Connemara, Chennai by actor Kamal Haasan and director Bharathiraja. The songs "Amma Endrale" and "Orayiram" are set the raga Pantuvarali, and "Mun Paniyaa" is set to Keeravani.

Song	Singer(s)	Lyricist	Duration
"Mun Paniyaa"	S. P. Balasubrahmanyam, Malgudi Subha	Palani Bharathi	5:47
"Or Aayiram Yaanai"	P. Unnikrishnan	Na. Muthukumar	3:35
"Engengo Kaalgal Sellum"	Ilaiyaraaja	Pulamaipithan	4:09
"Maayane Andha"	Rajalakshmi, Srimathumitha & Chorus^{*}	Aandaal	2:49
"Kalli Adi Kalli"	Anuradha Sriram, Srimathumitha & Chorus^{*}	Thamarai	4:06
"Amma Endralle"	Ilaiyaraaja	Pa. Vijay	4:32

^{*}The chorus consists of singers Ganga, Kanchana, Febi, Feji and Charulatha Mani

== Critical reception ==
S. R. Ashok Kumar from The Hindu noted that "powerful performance by the lead artists, a neat screenplay and narration without any deviations in the form of dance or song make Nandhaa worth watching. Bala's direction makes viewing a gripping experience." He added that "Surya as the young rustic man has reached a new milestone in acting. Rajkiran shines in the role of Periyavar. A surprise, however, is Rajashri, who reveals great histrionic skills." In comparison, Tulika of Rediff.com stated the film failed to live up to expectations, likening it to Aalavandhan (2001) and stated that "the screenplay is smooth and incident-driven. In the final analysis, it is the climax that may be the main reason why the audience does not lap up this film." Sify criticised the film's "Sethu hangover", but praised the performances of Suriya, Laila and Rajkiran, concluding, "Hankies will not be sufficient, take a towel if you are in the mood to watch Nanda".

Visual Dasan of Kalki wrote the director, who has proved that he can deliver a vibrant film without the masala fragrance, is keeping the faith of the fans he earned with Sethu with Nandhaa. K. N. Vijiyan of New Straits Times wrote "This is a moving story from director Bala who gave the runaway hit Sethu. If you liked Sethu, you'll probably enjoy this new venture". Malini Mannath of Chennai Online wrote "Director Bala re-establishes his credentials again as a film-maker who moves away from the beaten track, and tries to bring in freshness by way of concept and narrative style. His 'Nandha' like 'Sethu', before it, is different from the routine films. The artistes are chosen well, irrespective of their market rating, and the locations have a freshness too. But the director could have avoided repetition of scenes and ambience, which give a sense of deja vu".

== Accolades ==
Award	Category	Nominee	Result	Ref.
49th Filmfare Awards South	Best Tamil Director	Bala	Nominated	
49th Filmfare Awards South	Best Tamil Actress in Lead Role	Laila	Won	
49th Filmfare Awards South	Best Cinematographer	R. Rathnavelu	Won	
2001 Tamil Nadu State Film Awards	Best Film (Special Prize)	Nandhaa	Won	
2001 Tamil Nadu State Film Awards	Best Actor in Lead Role	Suriya	Won	
2001 Tamil Nadu State Film Awards	Best Cinematographer	R. Rathnavelu	Won	
2001 Tamil Nadu State Film Awards	Best Actor in Supporting Role	Rajkiran	Won	
3rd Pace Awards	Best Actor	Suriya	Won	
3rd Pace Awards	Best Actress	Laila	Won	
3rd Pace Awards	Best Supporting Actor	Rajkiran	Won	
3rd Pace Awards	Best Supporting Actress	Rajshree	Won	
3rd Pace Awards	Best New Face Comedy Actor	Karunas	Won	
3rd Pace Awards	Best Cinematographer	R. Rathnavelu	Won	
3rd Pace Awards	Best Male Playback Singer	S. P. Balasubrahmanyam	Won	
3rd Pace Awards	Best Female Playback Singer	Anuradha Sriram	Won	
3rd Pace Awards	Best Dubbing Artiste	Savitha	Won	
2002 Cinema Express Awards	Best Director	Bala	Won	
2002 Cinema Express Awards	Best Popular Actor	Suriya	Won	
2002 Cinema Express Awards	Best Lyricist	Thamarai	Won	

== Other versions ==
In 2004, Nandhaa was to be remade in Telugu starring Nandamuri Kalyan Ram and Anu Mehta, but the film was later dropped. Instead it was dubbed and released in the language at least twice; as Aakrosham (2006) and as Bala-Surya. This version was released by Nagamalla Shankar in 2011, shortly after the release of Bala's Avan Ivan.

== Legacy ==
Karunas' character in the film, "Lodukku Pandi", inspired the title of a 2015 film starring him.
