= Vaa Arugil Vaa =

- DVD cover
- Directed by: Kalaivanan Kannadasan
- Written by: Kalaivanan Kannadasan; Kanmani Subbu (dialogues)
- Produced by: A. Manavazhagan
- Starring: Ramya Krishnan; Raja; Vaishnavi
- Cinematography: T. Kaviyarasu (alias) T. Anandha Kumar
- Edited by: K. R. Ramalingam
- Music by: Chanakya
- Production company: Chozha Cine Arts
- Release date: 11 January 1991
- Country: India
- Language: Tamil

Vaa Arugil Vaa (transl. Come closer) is a 1991 Indian Tamil-language supernatural horror film starring Ramya Krishnan, Raja and Vaishnavi in lead roles. The film's concept was inspired from the American film Child's Play (1988). It was remade in Kannada in 1992 as Aathma Bandhana.

== Plot ==
In the village of Valivalam, near Nagapattinam, Tamil Nadu, lives a wealthy chieftain and his family. Ramu, the only son of the chieftain, falls in love with a girl named Lakshmi. Although Lakshmi’s father owns considerable property and assets, they are under legal dispute. Ramu manages to convince his family to approve the marriage.

The devious family believes that Lakshmi’s father will win the court case and plan to acquire the wealth for themselves. Lakshmi is treated well initially after the marriage. Her father buys her a voice-responsive, battery-operated doll. Shortly after Lakshmi becomes pregnant, the court case — which her father Arunagiri was relying on — gets dismissed, and he loses all his wealth to the opposing party. Heartbroken, he dies, leaving Lakshmi devastated.

This outcome deeply disappoints the chieftain’s family, who had previously been involved in coercive land and wealth acquisition. They devise a treacherous plan to accuse Lakshmi of having an illicit relationship with one of their servant accomplice, Anchezhuthu. Even Ramu begins to doubt Lakshmi’s character and ostracizes her within the household, forcing her to live in a storeroom with only her doll for company.

In Ramu’s absence, the in-laws plot to abuse Lakshmi until she runs away, hoping to replace her with a wealthier bride. Lakshmi overhears her in-laws discussing this scheme. In a fit of rage, she threatens to expose them to her husband and tries to flee the house, only to be caught by her uncle-in-law, Nalla Thambi. In the ensuing chaos, Lakshmi is stabbed with a broken soda bottle and dies. She vows to take revenge on everyone responsible for her death. Her spirit seemingly enters the doll.

Lakshmi’s body is hidden under a pile of wood and taken to a local temple where people walk on fire as a ritual. When Ramu returns, the family covers up the murder, claiming Lakshmi eloped with the servant she was accused of having an affair with. Unaware of the truth, Ramu lights the ceremonial fire, unknowingly cremating her body.

Eventually, the family convinces Ramu to marry a wealthy woman named Chandra. Though initially distant, Ramu starts to fall in love with her, and they consummate their marriage. Meanwhile, Lakshmi’s vengeful spirit remains in the doll, waiting for the right moment.

During a planned movie night, Ramu’s mother Vadivu stays home due to a headache. Possessed by Lakshmi’s spirit, the doll immolates Vadivu and makes it appear accidental. Anchezhuthu, the servant who had fled after Lakshmi’s murder, returns to extort the family for money but is also killed by the spirit.

Later, Chieftain Muthu Manickam is gored by a bull provoked by Lakshmi’s spirit. On his deathbed, he confesses that Lakshmi was innocent and that the family had murdered her. Ramu, consumed by guilt, confronts Nalla Thambi. Nalla Thambi suspects Chandra is possessed by Lakshmi and is responsible for the murders. However, the possessed doll brutally kills him, completing Lakshmi’s revenge.

Lakshmi’s spirit then taunts Chandra, saying she will kill Ramu and take him to the spirit realm so they can live together. Ramu is attacked but survives. Chandra performs rituals and dances before the sacrificial pyre in the temple. She burns the possessed doll, which seems to die but reanimates. Ramu advises Chandra to destroy it using the Goddess’s Trident, which she does.

Finally, Lakshmi’s spirit finds peace at the feet of the goddess. Ramu and Chandra unite and live happily ever after.

== Cast ==
- Raja as Ramu (a) Ramakrishnan
- Vaishnavi as Lakshmi
- Ramya Krishnan as Chandra
- Radha Ravi as Nalla Thambi
- S. S. Chandran as Muthu Manickam's accountant
- K. K. Soundar as Arunagiri
- Vijaya Chandrika as Vadivu
- Nandhakumar
- Karate Thyagarajan as Muthu Manickam
- Veera Raghavan as Advocate Varadharajan
- Sudha
- T. S. Krishnamoorthi
- Thedir Kannaiah
- Mohan
- J. Gopalsaamy
- Master Rajkumar as Kannan

== Soundtrack ==
The film music was composed by Chanakya and lyrics by Kanmani Subbu, Kalavanan Kannadasan, Uma Kannadasan, Panju Akiladasan, Aravindhan and Kavingnar Muthudasanaar.

| Song | Singers | Length |
|---|---|---|
| "Mana Madhurayil Paarthen" | K. J. Yesudas, S. Janaki | 04:36 |
| "Ponnumani Poochaarame" | Rajan Chakravarthi, S. Janaki | 03:07 |
| "Enna Vedhanai Enna Sodhanai" | S. Janaki | 04:18 |
| "Thaaye Enakku Kaaval" | S. Janaki | 05:09 |

== Reception ==
N. Krishnaswamy of The Indian Express wrote, "The director is aided with fine efforts by fine dialogues from [..] Kanmani Subbu, as well as music from Chanakya and neat performances from Vaishnavi, Raja, Vijayachandrika, Radha Ravi and Ramya Krishnan et al". C. R. K. of Kalki praised Vaishnavi's acting, Chanakya's music, cinematography and editing.
