= En Rasavin Manasile =

- Poster
- Directed by: Kasthuri Raja
- Written by: Kasthuri Raja
- Produced by: Rajkiran
- Starring: Rajkiran; Meena
- Cinematography: Kichas
- Edited by: L. Kesavan
- Music by: Ilaiyaraaja
- Production company: Red Sun Art Creations
- Release date: 13 April 1991
- Running time: 143 minutes
- Country: India
- Language: Tamil

En Rasavin Manasile (transl. In the heart of my man) is a 1991 Indian Tamil-language drama film directed by Kasthuri Raja in his directorial debut. The film stars Rajkiran (who also produced) and Meena. It was released on 13 April 1991. The film had a silver jubilee run and gave a break to Rajkiran and Meena. The film was later remade in Telugu as Moratodu Naa Mogudu (1992) with Meena reprising her role.

== Plot ==
Mayandi was a brave and strong man who was respected by the villagers. He was in love with his cousin Solaiyamma and wanted to marry her, but they had nothing in common. The soft-spoken Solaiyamma was afraid of him. In the meantime, Murugesan, a city youngster, fell in love with Solaiyamma's younger sister Kasthuri. Later, Mayandi and Solaiyamma had an arranged marriage, but Solaiyamma was still afraid of Mayandi after the marriage. One night, Mayandi came drunk to his house, where he molested and brutally raped the innocent Solaiyamma. Since that night, Solaiyamma began to avoid Mayandi, and she did not talk to him any more. A few months later, Solaiyamma discovered that she was pregnant. Mayandi and Solaiyamma were unable to understand their feelings. Finally, Mayandi's adopted mother Ponnuthayi brought them back together. Unfortunately, Solaiyamma died after giving birth. Kasthuri then brings up Mayandi's baby. Mayandi, who cannot take care of the baby alone, needs a wife to bring up his baby, and he thinks that Kasthuri would be the perfect mother for his baby. Kasthuri's mother, however, refuses as she feels that Mayandi was responsible for Solaiyamma's death. Meanwhile, Murugesan compels his father Pannaiyar, a ruthless landlord, to accept for the marriage. Pannaiyar encourages Mayandi to bring back his son Murugesan, but Kasthuri stops it and clearly tells him that she can only be with Murugesan. Mayandi decides to arrange Murugesan and Kasthuri's marriage against Pannaiyar's wish. In the end, Mayandi manages to get Murugesan and Kasthuri together along with subduing Pannaiyar, but dies from his injuries.

== Cast ==
- Rajkiran as Mayandi
- Meena as Solaiyamma
- Raj Chander as Murugesan
- Saradha Preetha as Kasthuri
- Srividya as Ponnuthayi
- Nambirajan as Pannaiyar
- Goundamani
- Senthil
- Vadivelu as Vadivelu
- Dubbing Janaki as Seeniamma
- K. S. Jayalakshmi as Pannaiyar's wife
- Manohar as Mokkasami
- Rambo Rajkumar
- Babitha as Pangajam
- Samikkannu as Thangamuthu

== Production ==
Kasthuri Raja, who earlier assisted K. S. Gopalakrishnan and Visu, made his directorial debut with this film. He said, "I went to narrate a story to Rajkiran, who was then looking for a script for Ramarajan, as he had got the dates of the popular actor. But script did not suit and I had to do a different script and Rajkiran acted in it". The film was based on a real event that happened in Kasthuri Raja's native village Malingapuram, he decided to make a film on it. Rajkiran's role was originally offered to Vijayakanth and Sathyaraj, both of whom declined. Meena's role was originally offered to Rekha, who declined due to date issues with Oliyampukal (1990). Vadivelu made his official acting debut with this film.

== Soundtrack ==
The soundtrack was composed by Ilaiyaraaja. The song "Poda Poda Punnakku" was recreated by his son Yuvan Shankar Raja for Coffee with Kadhal (2022). Piraisoodan was conferred the best lyricist award by the Tamilnadu State Government for the Solapasunkiliye song.

Song	Singer(s)	Lyrics	Length
"Kuyil Paattu" (happy)	Swarnalatha	Ponnadiyan	4:54
"Kuyil Paattu" (sad)	Swarnalatha	Ponnadiyan	3:35
"Kuyil Paattu" (sad)	Swarnalatha, Ilaiyaraaja	Ponnadiyan	3:35
"Paarijatha Poove"	S. N. Surendar, K. S. Chithra	Usha	5:00
"Pen Manasu Azham Endru"	Ilaiyaraaja	Ilaiyaraaja	3:50
"Poda Poda Punnaakku"	Kalpana Raghavendar, Vadivelu, Rajkiran	Ponnadiyan	5:43
"Sola Pasunkiliye"	Ilaiyaraaja	Piraisoodan	4:33

== Reception ==
C. R. K. of Kalki praised Rajkiran for his acting and also for introducing debutants including himself and director while also praising the cinematography and Ilaiyaraaja's music but was critical of certain dialogues in village dialect.

== Accolades ==
Award	Date of ceremony (Note: Date is linked to the article about the awards held that year, wherever possible.)	Category	Recipient(s)	Ref.
Tamil Nadu State Film Awards	c. 1994	Tamil Nadu State Film Award for Best Film-(Second Prize)	Rajkiran	
Tamil Nadu State Film Awards	c. 1994	Special Prize for Best Actor	Rajkirrajkiranan	
Tamil Nadu State Film Awards	c. 1994	Best Lyricist	Piraisoodan	
Cinema Express Awards	22 April 1992	Best New Face Award Actor	Rajkiran	
Film Fans Association Awards	21 June 1992	Best Film	Rajkiran	
Film Fans Association Awards	21 June 1992	Best Character Artist	Srividya	
