= Chinna Muthu =

1994 film by Shanmuga Sundaram

- Theatrical release poster
- Directed by: Shanmuga Sundaram
- Written by: Shanmuga Sundaram
- Produced by: Radha Ravi; Bhagyalakshmi Radha Ravi
- Starring: Radha Ravi
- Cinematography: V. Ranga
- Edited by: L. Kesavan
- Music by: Deva
- Production company: B. R. R. Art Enterprises
- Release date: 19 February 1994
- Country: India
- Language: Tamil

Chinna Muthu is a 1994 Indian Tamil-language action drama film written and directed by Shanmuga Sundaram in his debut. The film stars Radha Ravi in the title role with Rajeev, Y. G. Mahendran, Vaishnavi, and Chandrasekhar in supporting roles. It was released on 19 February 1994.

== Cast ==
- Radha Ravi as Chinna Muthu
- Rajeev as Mookaiyan
- Vaishnavi
- Padmashri
- Ravikanth
- Y. G. Mahendran
- Chandrasekhar
- Roopesh Raj as Thangarasu
- Asha as Shenbagam

== Production ==
Chinna Muthu marked the directorial debut of Shanmuga Sundaram, who earlier worked as a dialogue writer for Annaamalai (1992). Radha Ravi played the title role, and it was his third film which he had produced under his production company.

== Soundtrack ==
Soundtrack was composed by Deva, with lyrics by Vairamuthu.

Song	Singers	Length
"Chinna Muthu" (Lady)	Jikki	02:26
"Chinna Muthu" (Men)	S. P. Balasubrahmanyam	02:25
"Chinna Muthu" (Pathos)	S. P. Balasubrahmanyam	01:14
"Edhazh Oram"	K. S. Chithra, S. P. Balasubrahmanyam	03:26
"Parandhadhadi"	S. P. Balasubrahmanyam	05:00
"Soodana Manasu"	K. S. Chithra, S. P. Balasubrahmanyam	04:43
"Vadugapattiku Valathupakkam"	K. S. Chithra, Gangai Amaran	05:02
"Valathu Kaalai"	Swarnalatha, Malaysia Vasudevan	04:16

== Release and reception ==
Chinna Muthu was released on 19 February 1994. Malini Mannath of The Indian Express gave a negative review, criticising Radha Ravi because "he indulged in a lot of over-acting" and that his earlier productions were "much better efforts".
