= Sevatha Ponnu =

- VCD cover
- Directed by: A. Chandrakumar
- Written by: A. Chandrakumar
- Produced by: R. Dhanapalan
- Starring: Saravanan; Ahana; Vasu Vikram
- Cinematography: K. R. Ram Singh
- Edited by: S. Lakshmi Shankar
- Music by: Deva
- Production company: Yaghava Productions
- Release date: 16 June 1994
- Running time: 130 minutes
- Country: India
- Language: Tamil

Sevatha Ponnu (transl. Fair-skinned girl) is a 1994 Indian Tamil-language drama film, directed by A. Chandrakumar in his debut. The film stars Saravanan, Ahana and Vasu Vikram, while Vadivelu, S. S. Chandran, Srividya, Vennira Aadai Moorthy and Shanmugasundaram play supporting roles. It was released on 16 June 1994.

== Plot ==
The film revolves around three people: Chellappa, Saroja and Sudalamani. Chellappa is a smart college student from a poor family who lives with his widow mother Thangamma. Saroja is the daughter of the village chief and arrogant Rasathi. Sudalamani is Saroja's relative and a womanizer who teases the village girls. He wants to marry Saroja to gain her property. One day, Chellappa beats up Sudalamani, and they land at Saroja's house. At the village court, Chellappa remains silent. Saroja, irritated by his reaction, gets him suspended from the college. She later learns that Chellappa saved a blind girl from the pervert Sudalamani, but Chellappa remains silent at the village court to protect the blind girl's privacy.

Later, Saroja wrongly accuses Chellappa of kidnapping her and holding her for a day. Chellappa accepts the blame and he says that he did much worse. The villagers advise Saroja to marry Chellappa. The shrewish Rasathi refuses and tries to find a groom for her daughter, but nobody wanted to marry an unchaste woman. Only Sudalamani accepts for marriage, and they arrange their wedding. The day before their wedding, the villagers force Chellappa to marry Saroja. What transpires next forms the rest of the story.

== Cast ==
- Saravanan as Chellappa
- Ahana as Saroja
- Vasu Vikram as Sudalamani
- Vadivelu
- S. S. Chandran
- Srividya as Rasathi
- Vennira Aadai Moorthy as Gnanadesikan
- Shanmugasundaram
- Ennatha Kannaiya
- Idichapuli Selvaraj
- Premi as Sudalamani's mother
- Vaani as Thangamma
- Pasi Narayanan as Madusamy
- Thideer Kannaiah as Punniyakodi
- Kumarimuthu
- Thayir Vadai Desikan as Poosari
- R. K. as Sudalamani's friend
- Vellai Subbaiah as Marriage broker
- Joker Thulasi
- Bayilvan Ranganathan
- M. L. A. Thangaraj
- S. Sambar
- Pavithra
- Shobana
- Ramanujam
- Marthandan

== Production ==
Chandrakumar who earlier assisted Balu Anand made his directorial debut with this film after his supposed debut Surya Namaskaram got shelved.

== Soundtrack ==
The music was composed by Deva, with lyrics written by Vaali.

No.	Title	Singer(s)	Length
1.	"Chittirayil Thirumanam"	S. P. Balasubrahmanyam, Uma Ramanan	4:31
2.	"Colour Colour Kuruvigal"	Mano, Swarnalatha	4:52
3.	"Thodalama Koodathaa"	Krishnaraj, S. Janaki	4:24
4.	"Vadakku Kathu Veesa"	S. Janaki, Mano	5:14
5.	"Vatta Pottu Vacha Kiliye"	Mano, Swarnalatha	5:14

== Reception ==
Malini Mannath of The Indian Express wrote, "the handling of the script is not all that bad, and the director has managed to keep a steady pace throughout". The film did not do well at box-office.
