= Idhu Namma Bhoomi =

- Poster
- Directed by: P. Vasu
- Written by: P. Vasu
- Produced by: Radha Ravi
- Starring: Karthik; Khushbu
- Cinematography: M. C. Sekar
- Edited by: P. Mohanraj
- Music by: Ilaiyaraaja
- Production company: BRR Art Enterprises
- Release date: 5 June 1992
- Running time: 120 minutes
- Country: India
- Language: Tamil

Idhu Namma Bhoomi (transl. This is our Earth) is a 1992 Indian Tamil-language masala film written, directed by P. Vasu, and produced by Radha Ravi. The film stars Karthik and Khushbu. It was released on 5 June 1992.

== Plot ==
Jeganathan, a poor man, fell in love with Nagavalli, who was from the richest family in the village and Jeganathan married her secretly. Nagavalli's father died of a heart attack and her brother Rathnavel couldn't digest this humiliation. Jeganathan then worked hard and became as rich as Rathnavel.

The two men continue to hate each other. In an auction, Rathnavel's henchmen and Jeganathan's henchmen fight and Nagavalli is severely injured. Gopi, Jeganathan's son who lives with his grandmother Periyanayaki, comes back to see his mother. Nagavalli then dies and Gopi takes the challenge to unite the two families. Gopi decides to marry Rathnavel's daughter Nalini.

== Cast ==
- Karthik as Gopi
- Khushbu as Nalini
- Vijayakumar as Jeganathan
- Radha Ravi as Rathnavel
- Srividya as Nagavalli (guest appearance)
- Manorama as Valliammai
- Napoleon as Mirasudar
- S. S. Chandran as Vedachellam
- Vennira Aadai Moorthy as Music College Professor
- Sumithra as Suguna
- Rocky as Udhayamurthy
- Pandu
- Vasu Vikram as Kumaravel
- Rajeshkumar as Sundaravel
- Harshavardhan
- Uday Prakash
- Gandhimathi as Periyanayaki
- Oru Viral Krishna Rao
- Marthandam
- Thalapathi Dinesh
- Shakthi Vasudevan

== Production ==
When Vasu visited Coimbatore for Chinna Thambi, he was invited by two families to open their built hospitals and colleges which made Vasu to realize both the families are in loggerheads which formed basis for the plot of Idhu Namma Bhoomi. Some scenes were shot at Rajaji Hall.

== Soundtrack ==
The soundtrack was composed by Ilaiyaraaja, with lyrics written by Vaali. The song "Aaradi Suvaru" is set in Mayamalavagowla raga.

Song	Singer(s)	Length
"Folkunna Folkkuthaan"	Mano	4:42
"Aaradi Chuvaru Thaan"	K. J. Yesudas, Swarnalatha	4:58
"Oorai Kootti"	Mano, S. Janaki	5:31
"Oru Pokiri Raathiri"	Mano, Swarnalatha	5:00
"Vaana Mazhai"	K. J. Yesudas	4:46
"Idhu Namma Bhoomi"	Arunmozhi & Chorus	2:00

== Reception ==
The Indian Express wrote, "Though the script of director P. Vasu is bit old-fashioned, he has mixed all the right ingredients that go to make such movies in right proportions as a result of which this film has turned out to be a full-length entertainer".
