= Valivalam Manathunainathar Temple =

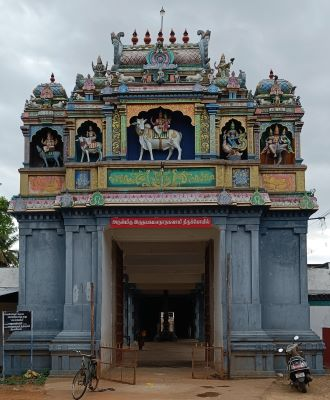
Entrance

Valivalam Manathunainathar Temple (வலிவலம் மனத்துணைநாதர் கோயில்) is a Hindu temple located at Valivalam in Nagapattinam district, Tamil Nadu, India. The temple is dedicated to Shiva, as the moolavar presiding deity, in his manifestation as Manathunainathar. His consort, Parvati, is known as Maazhai Onkanni.

== Significance ==
It is one of the shrines of the 275 Paadal Petra Sthalams – Shiva Sthalams glorified in the early medieval Tevaram poems by Tamil Saivite Nayanars Tirugnanasambandar, Tirunavukkarasar and Sundarar.

== History ==
The presiding deity is Shiva. There are also shrines to Surya, Karamamamunivar, the Pandavas, Kocengannan and Arunagirinathar. The temple is believed to have been constructed by the Early Chola king Kocengannan and renovated in more recent times. The temple is classified as a Madastalam, steeped structures where elephant cannot step in.

== Gallery ==
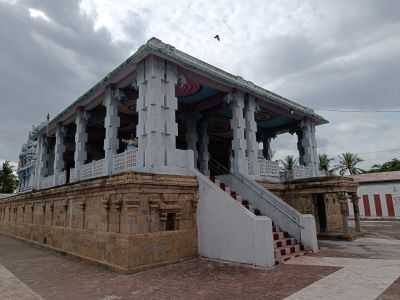
Right prakara

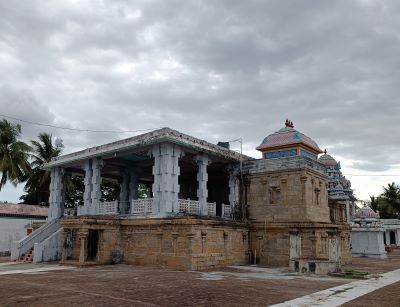
Left prakara

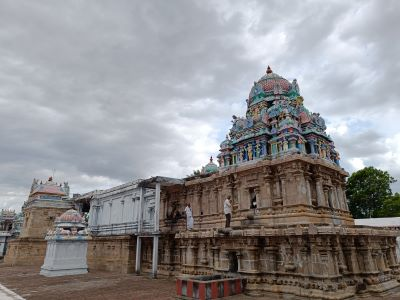
Vimana of the presiding deity

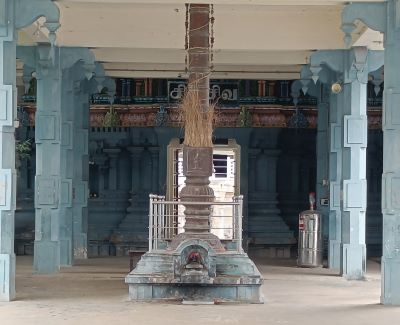
Flagpost

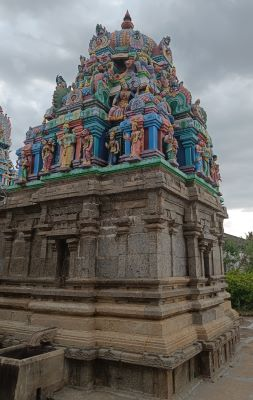
Vimana of the goddess

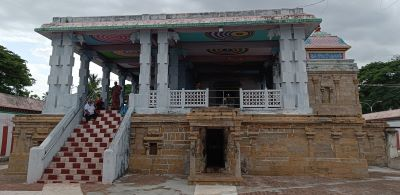
Mandapa
