= En Rajangam =

- Directed by: Siraj
- Written by: Siraj
- Produced by: Siraj
- Starring: Anandaraj; Ramarjun; Vinodhini; Sreeja
- Cinematography: K. B. Dhayalan
- Edited by: L. Kesavan
- Music by: Deva
- Production company: M. S. Film Circuit
- Release date: 18 March 1994
- Running time: 130 minutes
- Country: India
- Language: Tamil

En Rajangam is a 1994 Indian Tamil language comedy drama film directed and produced by Siraj. The film stars Anandaraj, Ramarjun, Vinodhini and Sreeja, with Jaishankar, Ravichandran, Eashwar, Shanmugasundaram, Vennira Aadai Moorthy and Thyagu playing supporting roles. It was released on 18 March 1994.

== Plot ==
Gopalakrishnan is an honest and naive police constable who lives with his only sister Sugandhi. Sugandhi and her classmate Suresh (Ramarjun) quarrel over small matters. Meanwhile, Gopalakrishnan and Kalyani squabble whenever they meet. One day, Kalyani's mother dies and Gopalakrishnan brings her at his home. Later, Suresh and Sugandhi fall in love and they get married secretly. Suresh's mother is later killed and the innocent Gopalakrishnan is arrested. Suresh discovers that the murder was planned by the corrupt politician Kodandam. What transpires later forms the crux of the story.

== Cast ==
- Anandaraj as Gopalakrishnan
- Ramarjun as Suresh
- Vinodhini as Sugandhi
- Sreeja as Kalyani
- Jaishankar as Chief Minister
- Ravichandran as Kodandam
- Eashwar
- Shanmugasundaram as Shanmugam
- Vennira Aadai Moorthy as Mayilsamy
- Thyagu
- Rocky
- Thalapathy Dinesh as DSP
- Babuji
- Sangeeta as Suresh's mother
- Sharmili
- Harini
- Loose Mohan as Sadagopan
- Thayir Vadai Desigan
- Kovai Senthil

== Soundtrack ==
The soundtrack was composed by Deva, with lyrics written by Kalidasan.

| Song | Singer(s) | Duration |
|---|---|---|
| "Annanmaare Thambimaare" | Deva | 4:09 |
| "Padikavandhadhu" (Men) | Mano | 4:46 |
| "Padikavandhadhu" (Lady) | Swarnalatha | 4:45 |
| "Thaniyaana Raathiri" | Swarnalatha, Mano | 4:44 |
| "Thathalangu Thalathalangu" | Mano, Swarnalatha | 4:01 |
