= Agana (actress) =

Indian actress

- Born: Ahana Qureshi
- Occupation: Actress
- Years active: 1993–1999

Agana (born Ahana Qureshi, also known as Ahana) is an Indian actress who appears in Tamil, Malayalam and Kannada films.

== Film career ==
Agana made her debut in Tamil movie Aranmanai Kili which was released in 1993. Her Malayalam movie debut was The City in 1994.

== Filmography ==
Year	Film	Role	Language	Notes
1993	Aranmanai Kili	Poongodi	Tamil	Debut film
1994	Ravanan	Meena	Tamil	
1994	Seevalaperi Pandi	Oyila	Tamil	
1994	Sevatha Ponnu	Saroja	Tamil	
1994	The City	Priya	Malayalam	
1997	Yuddha	Akshitha	Kannada	
1998	Sooryavanam		Malayalam	
1999	Sivan	Ahana	Tamil	
