= Veera Thalattu =

1998 film by Kasthuri Raja

- Film poster
- Directed by: Kasthuri Raja
- Written by: Kasthuri Raja
- Produced by: Vijayalakshmi Kasthoori Raja
- Starring: Murali; Rajkiran; Vineetha; Khushbu
- Cinematography: A. Venkatesan
- Edited by: Hari-Palani
- Music by: Ilaiyaraaja
- Production company: Kasthoori Manga Creations
- Release date: 10 April 1998
- Country: India
- Language: Tamil

Veera Thalattu (transl. Lullaby of Bravery) is a 1998 Indian Tamil-language action drama film written and directed by Kasthuri Raja. The film stars Murali, Vineetha and Khushbu, while Rajkiran, Radhika and Lakshmi play other supporting roles. It was released on 10 April 1998.

== Plot ==
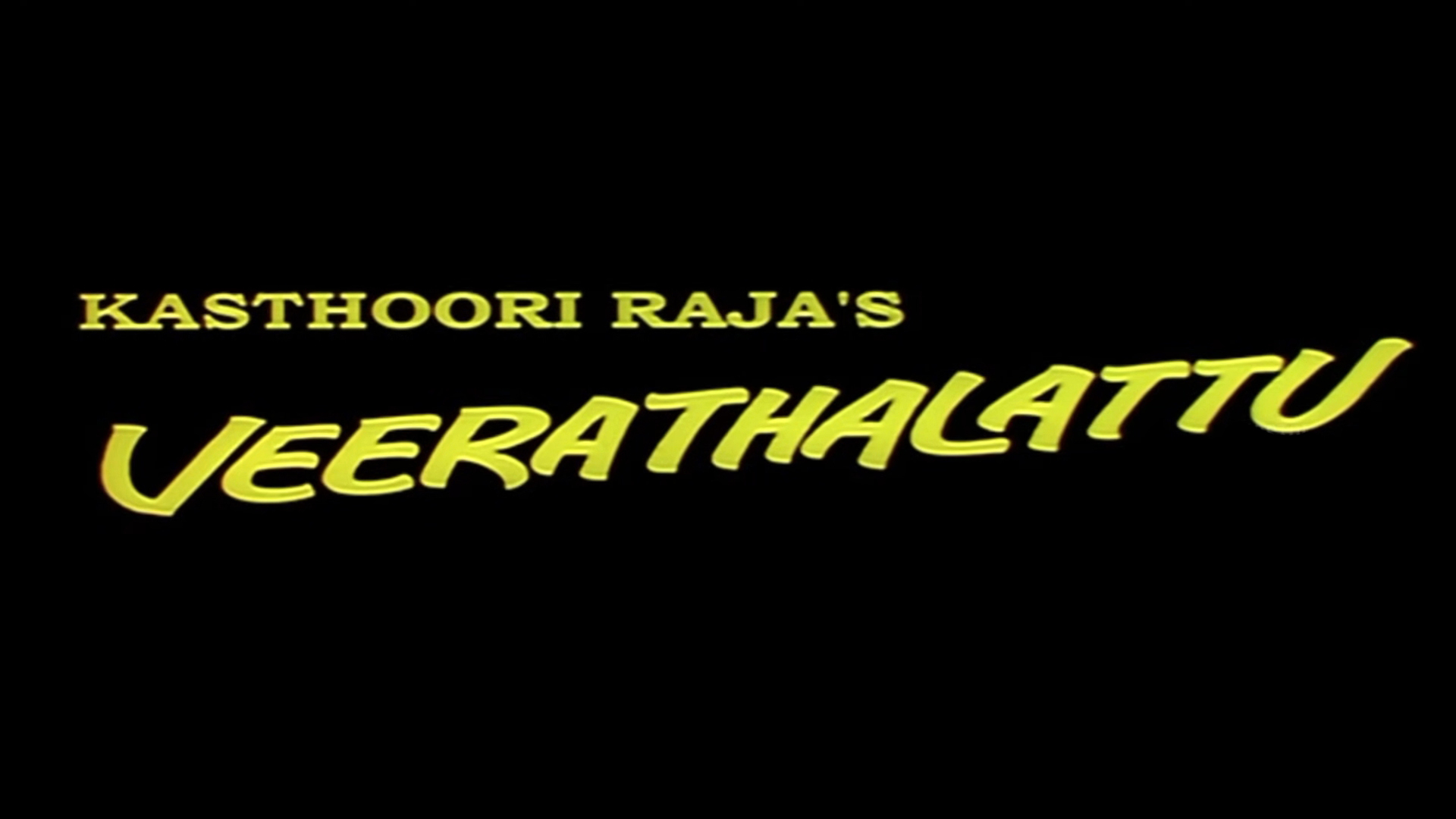
Title card

Pandi, a villager, loves his mother beyond words. However, Pandi gets shocked when his uncle reveals that she is not the one who gave birth to him.

== Cast ==
- Murali as Pandian
- Rajkiran as Pandian's father
- Vineetha as Eswari
- Khushbu as Village Girl
- Radhika as Pandian's mother
- Lakshmi as Nagalakshmi
- Santhana Bharathi
- Manivannan
- Karikalan
- Y. Vijaya
- R. Sundarrajan
- Shakeela

== Production ==
The film experienced production delays, taking over a year-and-a-half to complete.

== Soundtrack ==
Music was composed by Ilaiyaraaja, all songs were written by Kasthuri Raja.

Song	Singers
"Vaadipatti"	Gangai Amaran, S. P. Sailaja
"Saanthu Pottu"	Arunmozhi, Swarnalatha
"Pattapagal"	Malaysia Vasudevan, Swarnalatha
"Padikattuma"	S. Janaki
"Kumbhabhisekham"	S. P. Balasubrahmanyam, K. S. Chithra
"Kiliiyapola"	S. P. Sailaja, Gangai Amaran
"Katha Pola Thonum"	Ilaiyaraaja
"Amman Kovil"	Gangai Amaran, S. P. Sailaja
"Aararo"	Swarnalatha
"Aalapirandha Maharasa"	K. S. Chithra, Ilaiyaraaja

== Reception ==
Ji of Kalki praised Rajkiran's acting and Ilaiyaraaja's music but felt Khushbu was wasted and despite Lakshmi's good acting she felt ill-suited for villager's role.
