= Sathyavan =

- Directed by: Raj Kapoor
- Screenplay by: Raj Kapoor
- Story by: Vamsy
- Produced by: B. N. S. R. P. Reddy
- Starring: Murali; Gautami
- Cinematography: M. Sudhakar
- Edited by: B. Lenin; V. T. Vijayan
- Music by: Ilaiyaraaja
- Production company: N. S. R. Productions
- Release date: 9 September 1994
- Running time: 140 minutes
- Country: India
- Language: Tamil

Sathyavan (transl. Truthful man) is a 1994 Indian Tamil language comedy film directed by Raj Kapoor. The film stars Murali and Gautami, with Goundamani, Senthil, R. Sundarrajan, Uday Prakash, Vennira Aadai Moorthy and Vadivukkarasi playing supporting roles. It was released on 9 September 1994. The film is a remake of the Telugu film April 1 Vidudala.

== Plot ==
The film starts with the videographer Diwakar arriving late to video-shoot a marriage, where he falls in love with Bhuvaneshwari at first sight. He then gets a hold of Bhuvaneshwari's maternal uncle Anjaneya and obtains information about Bhuvaneshwari. He gathers that she respects only the people who are self-employed and straightforward. He also finds out that she is unmarried and she is about to be transferred to his village. Back to his village, Diwakar has the plan to open a video shop with his friend Mani. To secure the capital, he uses all kinds of tricks to rip off the villagers. Diwakar blackmails Bhagyam to reveal her extramarital affair to her husband. He then gets money from Kiruba, a married man who is in love with Bhagyam and promises him to join them. He even claims money from chit fund which he never was a member of. After getting enough money, he opens his video shop. He starts to sell electronic products found on the street and advertises them as new products imported from Dubai.

Anjaneya writes him letters in Bhuvaneshwari's name making Diwakar assume that she is in love with him. Afterwards, Bhuvaneshwari, her mother and her bachelor uncle Anjaneya land in Diwakar's village, Diwakar arranges them a house. He learns that Bhuvaneshwari doesn't love him and he had been cheated by Anjaneya all along. Bhuvaneshwari puts forward a deal that she would marry Diwakar only if he stays out of cheating, and does not utter a lie in a month. What transpires next forms the rest of the story.

== Cast ==
- Murali as Diwakar
- Gautami as Bhuvaneshwari
- Goundamani as Kiruba
- Senthil as Mani
- R. Sundarrajan as Anjaneya
- Uday Prakash as Gopi
- Vennira Aadai Moorthy as Moorthy
- Vadivukkarasi as Bhuvaneshwari's mother
- Kavitha as Diwakar's mother
- Rama Prabha as Moorthy's wife
- Sharmili as Bhagyam
- Vijaya Chandrika as Kiruba's wife
- Mahima as Ammu
- Typist Gopu as Mathrubootham
- Kumarimuthu as Kuppasamy
- Chelladurai as Ramamurthy
- Boopathi Raja as Sundar
- Kovai Senthil
- Rajkumar
- Chaplin Balu as Barber
- Sethu Vinayagam as Thangaraj

== Soundtrack ==
The soundtrack was composed by Ilaiyaraaja, with lyrics written by Vaali.

Song	Singer(s)	Duration
"Yappavum Naanthaanda"	Mano	5:09
"Kalyaanam Kacheari"	Mano, Sundarrajan	4:40
"Kanmani Kanmani Minnidum"	Mano, K. S. Chithra	5:08
"Poi Sonnean Poiea Sonnean"	Mano, K. S. Chithra	5:08
"Unnai Naan Leasa"	Mano, Minmini	4:42

== Reception ==
Malini Mannath of The Indian Express gave a negative review, criticising the slow screenplay and the performances of the actors.
