= Rahasya Rathri =

- VCD cover
- Directed by: M. S. Kumar
- Written by: Omkara Vani (dialogues)
- Screenplay by: M. S. Kumar
- Story by: M. S. Kumar
- Produced by: R. N. Brothers
- Starring: Vishnuvardhan; Bharathi; Prakash; Radha Ravi
- Cinematography: Annayya; Mallik; Murugesh
- Edited by: E. Arunachalam
- Music by: Shankar–Ganesh
- Production company: Janaranjan Pictures
- Distributed by: Janaranjan Pictures
- Release date: 3 August 1980
- Running time: 126 min
- Country: India
- Language: Kannada

Rahasya Rathri is a 1980 Indian Kannada-language film, directed by M. S. Kumar and produced by R. N. Brothers. The film stars Vishnuvardhan, Bharathi, Prakash and Radha Ravi. The film has musical score by Shankar–Ganesh.

== Cast ==
- Vishnuvardhan
- Bharathi
- Padmapriya
- Jayamalini
- Jyothi Lakshmi
- Halam as Rama
- Narasimharaju
- Balakrishna
- Dinesh
- B. Jaya
- Radha Ravi

== Soundtrack ==
The music was composed by Shankar–Ganesh.

No.	Song	Singers	Lyrics	Length (m:ss)
1	"Matkalli Muknalli"	L. R. Eswari, S. P. Balasubrahmanyam, chorus	Vijaya Narasimha	03:49
2	"Baalalli Sneha Olavaage Novu"	K. J. Yesudas, Ramani	Vijaya Narasimha	03:30
3	"Sogasaagide Nage Chellide"	S. P. Balasubrahmanyam, Vani Jairam	Vijaya Narasimha	03:11
4	"Rama Enuva"	P. B. Srinivas, chorus	Vijaya Narasimha	03:21
5	"Haayagide Jhummendide"	L. R. Eswari	Vijaya Narasimha	03:53
