= Seeman (film) =

- Theatrical release poster
- Directed by: Raj Kapoor
- Written by: Raj Kapoor
- Produced by: M. G. Sekar; S. Santhanam
- Starring: Karthik; Sukanya
- Cinematography: B. Balamurugan
- Edited by: B. Lenin; V. T. Vijayan
- Music by: Ilaiyaraaja
- Production company: M. G. Pictures
- Release date: 15 April 1994
- Country: India
- Language: Tamil

Seeman (transl. Rich Man) is a 1994 Indian Tamil-language film written and directed by Raj Kapoor. The film stars Karthik and Sukanya and was released on 15 April 1994.

== Cast ==
- Karthik as Collector Chandru I. A. S
- Sukanya as Bhagyam
- Jai Ganesh as Church Father
- Kavitha as Abirami
- Goundamani as Dawali
- Senthil
- Salim Ghouse as Masanam
- Manorama
- Silk Smitha
- Sindhu as Priya
- Vadivukkarasi (guest appearance)
- Sabitha Anand as Meenakshi (guest appearance)
- Vagai Chandrasekhar
- Thalapathy Dinesh as Dinesh
- Thyagu
- Udayprakash as Mani
- Shanmugasundari

== Soundtrack ==
The music was composed by Ilaiyaraaja, with lyrics by Vaali.

Song	Singers	Length
"Ennamo Nadanthuruku"	Venkataraman, Shanmugasundari	05:01
"Manu Koduthu"	S. Janaki	05:32
"Naatukottai Chettiyar"	Mano, Sunandha	04:57
"Ootu Kettu"	T. L. Maharajan, Mano	05:08
"Sadu Gudu Thodu"	Mano	05:47

== Reception ==
Malini Mannath of The Indian Express gave a negative review stating that "Raj Kapoor [..] has not done justice to the talented artiste Karthik". R. P. R. of Kalki criticized the film, remarking that "no matter which donkey the story rides on till the interval, then there is a little suspense, and then there are seven to eight fights to give it a happy end." He noted that this formula had become typical of the series. He also panned Ilaiyaraaja's music but praised cinematography as the film's only positive aspect.
