= Siraj (director) =

Indian film director

- Born: 1952; Cumbum, Theni District
- Died: 24 July 2017 (age 65); Chennai, Tamil Nadu, India
- Occupations: Film director, screenwriter
- Years active: 1989–1999

Siraj (1952 – 24 July 2017) was an Indian film director, who worked in Tamil cinema.

== Career ==
Throughout his career, he remained a close acquaintance to actor Ramarajan. In 1999, Siraj worked on the multi-starrer film Suyamvaram (1999), also being responsible for the film's screenplay.

In 2014, Siraj was working on a film titled Minnal and cast NRI actress Angana Adya in dual lead roles, giving her an extra character after being impressed with her performance. The film's lead actors were to be played by debutants Abhinay and Aathava, who developed an eight-pack for the film. The film was supposed to have a theatrical release in October 2014, but eventually was shelved.

== Filmography ==
Year	Title	Notes
1989	Enne Petha Raasa	
1990	Thangathin Thangam	
1991	Oorellam Un Paattu	
1994	En Rajangam	
1999	Suyamvaram	

== Death ==
Siraj died on 24 July 2017 at the age of 65 in Chennai after being admitted to hospital complaining of chest pains.
