= Rajkiran =

Indian actor

- Born: Mohideen Abdul Khadar; 16 March 1949 (age 77); Kilakarai, Ramanathapuram, Tamil Nadu, India
- Occupations: Actor; Film producer
- Years active: 1988–present
- Spouse: Padmaja
- Children: 2

Mohideen Abdul Khadar, known by his stage name Rajkiran, is an Indian actor, producer and director, who has acted in more than 30 Tamil films. He won one Filmfare Award South and four Tamil Nadu State Film Awards in his career.

== Early life ==
Rajkiran was born as J. Mohideen Abdul Khadar on 16 March 1949 at Keelakarai.

== Career ==
In 1987, he launched his production company and titled it Red Sun Art Creations. Then he changed his name, and he opted for Kiran (rays of the sun) and prefixed Raj. Rajkiran began his film career by producing two Ramarajan starrer films Raasave Unnai Nambi (1988) and in one of them he appeared in a brief role in Enne Petha Raasa (1989).

In 1991, he produced and acted in the lead role in Kasthuri Raja's debut film, En Rasavin Manasile which had a silver jubilee run. He won the Tamil Nadu State Film Award Special Prize and the Cinema Express – Best New Face Award for his performance. He directed, produced and acted in lead role in Aranmanai Kili (1993) and Ellame En Rasathan (1995). Next, he acted in Manikkam which was an average grosser at the box-office. The following year, he worked in Pasamulla Pandiyare (1997). In mid-1998, he appeared in Ponnu Velayira Bhoomi and made a guest appearance in Kasthuri Raja's Veera Thalattu. At the end of 1998, he acted in the critically well received Thalaimurai.

Following a three-year hiatus, he returned in Bala's Nandhaa (2001), Cheran's Pandavar Bhoomi (2001) followed by N. Lingusamy's Sandakozhi (2005) as a character artiste. All the three films fetched him the Tamil Nadu State Film Award for Best Supporting Actor. He won Filmfare Award for Best Supporting Actor – Tamil. for Thavamai Thavamirundhu (2005). Then, he acted in the comedy horror Muni (2007).

He later appeared in the movies Kaavalan (2011), Ponnar Shankar (2011), Venghai (2011), Thiruthani (2012) and Manjapai (2014). He has also featured in many TV commercials. He refused to do a dhoti advertisement which created headlines in 2015. He acted in lead role in the movie Pa. Pandi in 2017 directed by Dhanush. He debuted in Malayalam with the film Shylock (2020) with Mammootty. Later, he was seen in Karthi starrer films Viruman (2022), Meiyazhagan (2024) and Vaa Vaathiyaar (2026).

== Personal life ==
Rajkiran was initially married to Chellamma, but the couple divorced. He later married Padmaja, with whom he has a son.

== Filmography ==
| Year | Film | Role | Notes |
|---|---|---|---|
| 1989 | Enne Petha Raasa | Johnny | |
| 1991 | En Rasavin Manasile | Mayandi | Debut as hero Tamil Nadu State Film Award for Best Film (Second); Tamil Nadu State Film Award Special Prize (Actor); Cinema Express Award for Best New Face Actor |
| 1993 | Aranmanai Kili | Raasaiyya | |
| 1995 | Ellame En Rasathan | Singarasu | |
| 1996 | Manikkam | Manikkam | |
| 1997 | Pasamulla Pandiyare | Pandiyan | |
| 1998 | Ponnu Velayira Bhoomi | Palanisamy | |
| 1998 | Thalaimurai | Pandithurai | |
| 1998 | Veera Thalattu | Pandian's father | |
| 2001 | Nandhaa | Periyavar | Tamil Nadu State Film Award for Best Supporting Actor |
| 2001 | Pandavar Bhoomi | Dhanasekaran | Tamil Nadu State Film Award for Best Supporting Actor |
| 2002 | Kadhal Virus | Himself | Cameo appearance |
| 2003 | Konji Pesalaam | Muthupandi | |
| 2004 | Jai | Nallamuthu | |
| 2004 | Kovil | Periyasamy | |
| 2005 | Sandakozhi | Dorai | Tamil Nadu State Film Award for Best Supporting Actor |
| 2005 | Sevvel | Sudalai | |
| 2005 | Thavamai Thavamirundhu | Muthaiah | Filmfare Award for Best Supporting Actor – Tamil |
| 2007 | Kireedam | Rajarajan | |
| 2007 | Muni | Muniyandi | |
| 2007 | Thottal Poo Malarum | Varadharaja Vaandiyar | |
| 2011 | Kaavalan | Muthuramalingam | |
| 2011 | Ponnar Shankar | Raaki Annan | |
| 2011 | Venghai | Veera Pandi | |
| 2012 | Thiruthani | Duraipandi | |
| 2014 | Manjapai | Venkatasamy | |
| 2015 | Komban | Muthaiah | |
| 2015 | Sivappu | Konaar | |
| 2016 | Rajini Murugan | Ayankalai | |
| 2017 | Pa. Pandi | Paandian Pazhanisami | Nominated, Filmfare Award for Best Actor – Tamil |
| 2018 | Sandakozhi 2 | Dorai | |
| 2020 | Shylock | Ayyanar | Malayalam film |
| 2022 | Viruman | Niraipandiyan Thevar | |
| 2022 | Pattathu Arasan | Poththaari | |
| 2024 | Meiyazhagan | Sudalamuthu a.k.a. 'Sokku Mama' | |
| 2025 | Maaman | Singarayar | |
| 2025 | Idli Kadai | Sivanesan | |
| 2026 | Vaa Vaathiyaar | Ramu's grandfather | |

=== Off-screen roles ===
| Year | Film | Credited as | | | Notes |
| Year | Film | Director | Writer | Producer | Notes |
|---|---|---|---|---|---|
| 1988 | Raasave Unnai Nambi | ✗ | ✗ | ✓ | |
| 1989 | Enne Petha Raasa | ✗ | ✓ | ✓ | |
| 1991 | En Rasavin Manasile | ✗ | ✗ | ✓ | |
| 1993 | Aranmanai Kili | ✓ | ✓ | ✓ | Directorial debut film |
| 1995 | Ellame En Rasathan | ✓ | ✓ | ✓ | |
| 2020 | Kuberan | ✗ | ✗ | ✓ | Distributor for Tamil dubbed version |

Awards
Filmfare Awards South
| Preceded by R. Madhavan for Aayitha Ezhuthu | Best Supporting Actor for Thavamai Thavamirundhu; 2005 | Succeeded by Pasupathy for E |
