= Vaishnavi Aravind =

Indian actress

- Born: India
- Occupation: actress
- Years active: 1987–1997; 2019–present
- Spouse: Aravind Kamalanathan
- Children: 2
- Relatives: Sowcar Janaki (Grandmother)

Vaishnavi is an Indian actress, theatre actor and voice artist. She was a prominent lead actress from 1988 to 1997 in Tamil, Telugu, Kannada and Malayalam films. She is the granddaughter of actress Sowcar Janaki.

== Family ==
Vaishnavi's mother Yagnna Prabha is the elder daughter of Sowcar Janaki. In 1996, she married cinematographer Aravind Kamalanathan who worked in her debut film, after which she stopped acting. They have two daughters.

== Filmography ==
Vaishnavi started her film career with Thalaivanukkor Thalaivi in 1987. She has also done 100 shows of a drama, called "Lakshmi Kalyana Vaibhovame"' in 1993, touring US, Thailand, Sri Lanka, London and Paris.

=== Tamil ===
Year	Film	Role	Notes
1987	Thalaivanukkor Thalaivi	Clara	
1988	Kadarkarai Thaagam	Sudha	
1988	Nethiyadi	Vanam	
1989	En Thangai	Seetha	
1990	Sandhana Kaatru	Shanthi	
1990	Pulan Visaranai	Vasantha Gopalan's wife	
1990	Oru Veedu Iru Vasal	Yamuna	
1990	60 Naal 60 Nimidam	Priya	
1990	Salem Vishnu	Raji	
1990	Puthu Paatu	Special appearance	
1990	Pengal Veettin Kanngal	Ragini	
1991	Vaa Arugil Vaa	Lakshmi Ramu's first wife	
1991	Dharma Durai	Vaibhavi	
1991	Mangalyam Thandhunane	Saradha	
1991	Idhaya Vaasal	Indu	Guest appearance
1991	Maanagara Kaaval	Seetha	
1992	Deiva Kuzhanthai	Laxmi	
1992	Annaamalai	Kamala	
1992	Roja	Shenbagam	
1992	Thalaivasal	Ananthi	
1992	Chembaruthi	Lakshmi	
1993	Uthama Raasa	Mangai	
1994	Nattamai	Rasathi	
1994	Jai Hind	Susila	
1994	Chinna Muthu	Sevanth	
1994	Veettai Paaru Naattai Paaru	Gouri	
1994	Veeramani	Shanthi	
1995	Aanazhagan	Doctor	
1995	Kolangal	Archana	
1995	Muthu Kaalai	Maheshwari	
1996	Mahaprabhu	Uma	
1996	Manikkam	Pavunnu	

=== Television ===
Year	Film	Role	Notes
	Sangursh		TV Serial
	Oorarinda Rahasiyam		TV Serial
	Kottaipurathu Veedu		TV Serial
	Arthamulla Uruvugal		TV Serial
	Aadhiparasakthi		TV Serial

=== Malayalam ===
Year	Film	Role	Notes
1989	Mrugaya	Radhamani	
1992	Makkal Mahatmyam	Radhika	
1992	Aham	Vimala	
1992	Soorya Manasam	Young Mariya	
1992	Ayalathe Adheham	Radhika	
1995	Maanthrikam	Shakeela	

=== Kannada ===
- 1992 – Aathma Bandhana

=== Telugu ===
- 1988 – Prema as Lizzy
- 1991 – Attintlo Adde Mogudu as Sharada
- 1992 - Chamanti
- 1993 – Ayyappa Karuna
- 1993 – Paruvu Prathista as Sita
- 1995 – Subha Sankalpam as Rakkamma

=== Hindi ===
- 1995 – Ravan Raaj: A True Story as Dharma

=== Voice Artist ===
Year	Film	Actress	Notes
1991	Nee Pathi Naan Pathi	Gautami	
1993	Thiruda Thiruda	Anu Aggarwal	
2022	Rocketry: The Nambi Effect	Simran	

== Awards ==
- She won Nandi Award for Best Supporting Actress - Subha Sankalpam (1995)
