= Radha Ravi =

Indian actor

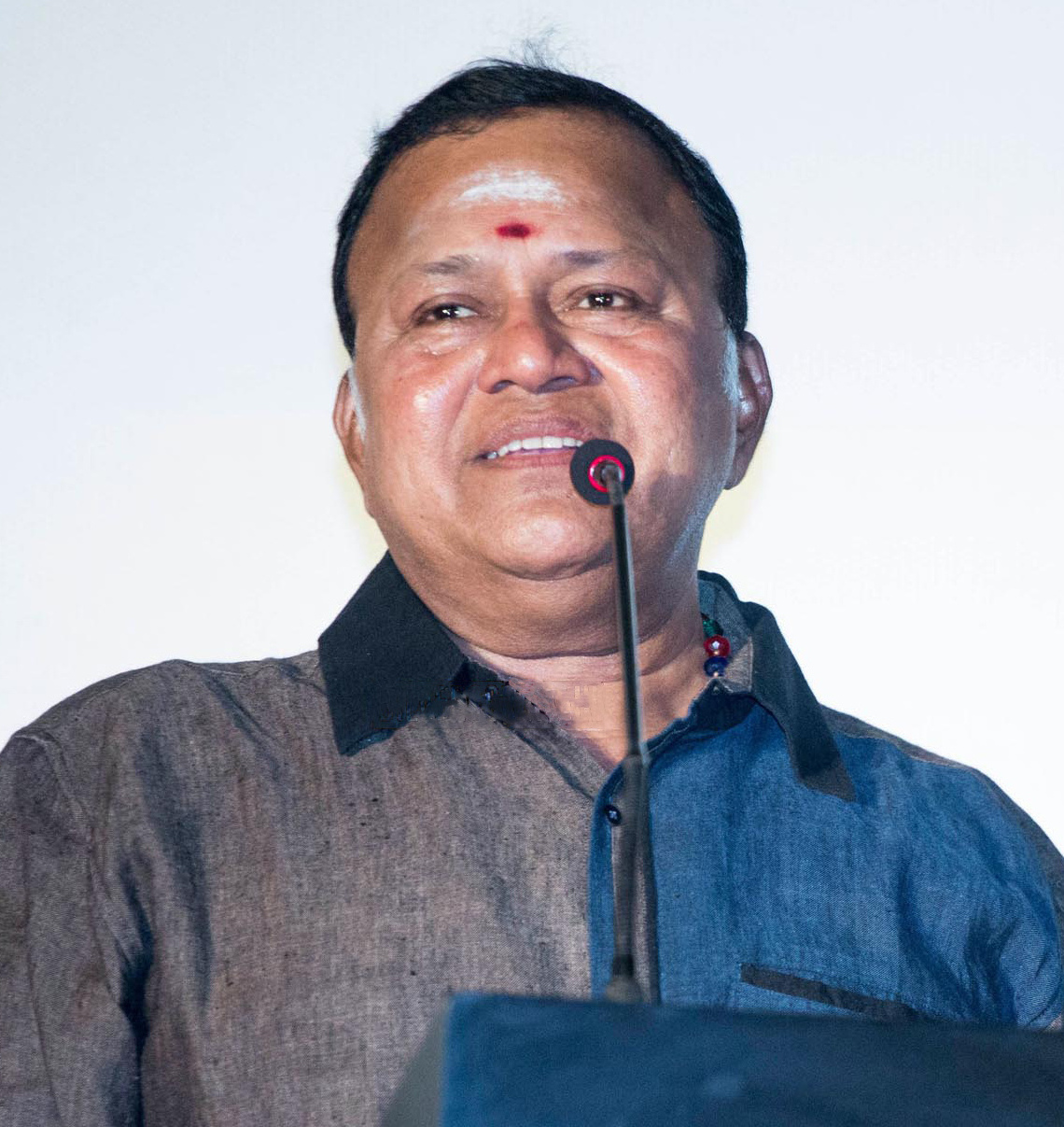
- Radha Ravi in 2016
- Born: Madras Rajagopalan Radhakrishnan Ravi Naidu; 29 July 1952 (age 74); Tiruchirapalli, Madras State, India
- Education: The New College, Chennai
- Occupations: Actor, politician
- Years active: 1976–present
- Works: Full list
- Political party: Bharatiya Janata Party
- Spouse: Bhagyalakshmi
- Children: 2
- Parent(s): M. R. Radha; Dhanalakshmi
- Relatives: Radha family

Member of Tamil Nadu Legislative Assembly
- In office 8 June 2002 – 11 May 2006
- Preceded by: V. Perumal
- Succeeded by: G. Senthamizhan
- Constituency: Saidapet

Madras Rajagopalan Radhakrishnan Ravi (born 2 December 1960), better known by his stage name Radha Ravi, is an Indian actor and politician who played mostly in villain roles and character roles. He is the son of veteran actor M. R. Radha, the uncle of Vasu Vikram and half-brother of actresses Radhika & Nirosha. He is a former chief member of the Tamil Nadu Film Artistes' Association. He is known for his roles as antagonists in Tamil films and a he acted in the serial Chellamae. He is also known for his controversial criticism of other film personalities.

He was elected to the Tamil Nadu Legislative Assembly from Saidapet in 2001 as a member of the All India Anna Dravida Munnetra Kazhagam. He is one of the current state executive members of Tamil Nadu Bharatiya Janata Party.

== Career ==
Radha Ravi was born to the well-known actor M. R. Radha and Dhanalakshmi Ammal. He has one brother, M. R. R. Vasu, and three sisters, Rashya, Rani and Rathikala. Having started his career as a theatre artiste, he still associates himself with plays. He is a man with diverse interests. He played the role of Julius Caesar in a Tamil drama when he was in the ninth standard. During his New College days, both his friends, Jailani and Rafee helped him to pursue his passion for theatre. He performed for V. K. Ramasamy troupe, M. R. R. Vasu troupe, T. K. Chandran troupe and the UAA troupe. In 1980, he started his own troupe Nadikavel Theatres. His first time before the camera was for a Kannada film Rahasya Rathri (1980), produced by actor Bharathi's father for BNK Pictures in 1976. His first Tamil film was Manmadha Leelai (1976), after Kamal Haasan recommended his name to K. Balachander.

Director Rama Narayanan gave his career a boost, while T. Rajendar was instrumental in casting him as a villain in Uyirullavarai Usha (1983). But it was actor S. S. Chandran who made him speak like his father in that film and made the world sit up and take notice. He later modified himself into one of the most versatile character-actors the Tamil industry has ever produced.

He made notable performances in films such as Vaidehi Kathirunthal (1984), Uyarndha Ullam (1985), Guru Sishyan (1988), Rajadhi Raja (1989), Solaikuyil (1989), Chinna Thambi (1991), Annaamalai (1992), Uzhaippali (1993), Pooveli (1998), Padayappa (1999), Oru Murai Sollividu (2004), Iraivi (2016), Sarkar (2018) and Kadaisi Thotta (2025).

He tried his hand in production with films such as Thai Maasam Poo Vasam (1990), Idhu Namma Bhoomi (1992), Chinna Muthu (1994) and Ilaignar Ani (1994).

Apart from being a renowned actor, he is also an eminent leader. He heads the Lions Club of Chennai and serves as the secretary of Nadigar Sangam, which he led a few years ago.

== Controversies ==
Radha Ravi became known for his vocal criticism of the actions of other film personalities. On a few occasions, he has spoken out against the actions of several artists. He has also spoken out against larger organizations, such as the Film Employees Federation of South India. His comments were widely reported in the media and became controversial. Ravi has also made misogynistic remarks on multiple occasions in public. Once he said he would have opportunity to rape Aishwarya Rai if he had known Hindi.

In March 2019, during a trailer release function for Kolaiyuthir Kaalam, he made misogynistic comments towards the film's lead actress Nayanthara, leading to his suspension from the DMK. He slut-shamed Nayanthara again in 2021.

Radha Ravi has faced multiple accusations at the Dubbing Union and he had been accused of falsely claiming Datukship by the Government of Malacca, Malaysia. The Melakan government has confirmed that they never conferred Datuk title to Ravi. The building of Tamil Nadu Film Dubbing Association, of which Ravi is the long time president, is named as "Dato Radha Ravi Complex".

He criticised Asin on her visit to Sri Lanka, where the heavily opposed civil war took place, in 2010 for the filming of Ready. He was quoted as saying: "Sangam won't spare actress Asin's recent visit to Sri Lanka to take part in the shooting of her 2011 Hindi film Ready opposite Salman Khan". However, R. Sarathkumar, president of the Nadigar Sangam, stated that "it's the prerogative of the artiste to go to whichever country they wanted".

He faced controversy over his criticism against Academy Award-winner A. R. Rahman for being involved in more Bollywood productions and composing film scores in foreign studios, rather than in Tamil Nadu, saying: "I would like to make it clear that Rahman's debut was Roja and not Slumdog Millionaire. He was introduced by Kavithalaya Productions, a Tamil film production company. But today, he has declined to acknowledge it by giving priorities merely to Hindi films".

Between 1987 and 2015, Radha Ravi was heavily involved in the Nadigar Sangam. He served as president until 2002, when he was criticized for mismanagement and replaced by Vijayakanth. In 2006, he was appointed as the association's General Secretary, while his brother-in-law R. Sarathkumar became president. In 2015, Ravi and Sarathkumar were defeated in election by Vishal and Nassar respectively after both were accused for being involved in a conflict of interest in the Nadigar Sangam building controversy. Radha Ravi was commonly accused of using unparliamentary language against actors.

In March 2017, Ravi got himself involved in a controversy when he mocked the DMK's political rivals MDMK's Vaiko and PMK's S. Ramadoss and compared them to differently-abled children. DMK's Kanimozhi accused him for his insensitive speech and said that the DMK cadre would not accept this. Disability groups also condemned his statements.

He received criticism when he made distasteful remarks and fun on Pollachi sexual assault incident in March 2019. He compared the Pollachi sexual assault issue to a big-budget film. "These days, people do not understand the difference between a big film and small film. A small film is where one guy rapes another girl. A big film is where 40 women are raped like the Pollachi incident. This is the difference," and smiled.

In another instance, Ravi made startling allegations against Kalki 2898 AD producer Aswini Dutt, further drawing criticism from industry insiders. The nature of these allegations and their implications stirred discussions across Kollywood circles.

=== Political career ===
During the early 2000s, Radha Ravi started his political career as a campaigner for the Dravida Munnetra Kazhagam (DMK) and later joined the All India Anna Dravida Munnetra Kazhagam (AIADMK) because of an opinion difference with the leadership of the DMK.

During the 2002 Tamil Nadu Assembly by-elections, he was named as the AIADMK nominee from the Saidapet constituency. He served as a Member of the Legislative Assembly (MLA) from 2001 to 2006. During the 2006 elections, however, he was not re-nominated.

He rejoined the AIADMK in 2010 in the presence of J. Jayalalithaa at her residence and remained inactive in the party.

In 2017, he left AIADMK and joined the DMK at the party headquarters after meeting M. K. Stalin. He said DMK is the only party that has the confidence of the people and also said that Stalin is the most suitable state leader and only he could save Tamil Nadu.

In March 2019, he was expelled out of DMK due to his alleged sexist comments against actress Nayanthara. Stalin said he condemned such conduct as it was against the party's ideals.

He joined the AIADMK again in June 2019 in a meeting with Chief Minister Edappadi Palaniswami, after he was expelled out of the DMK.

He left AIADMK and Joined the Bharatiya Janata Party in November 2019 on a meet with the party's president J. P. Nadda in Chennai. On July 15, actor and politician Radha Ravi was made the state Executive Member by BJP's Tamil Nadu president, L. Murugan. While campaigning for the BJP's Vanathi Srinivasan in the 2021 Tamil Nadu Legislative Assembly election, Ravi made derogatory comments against Kamal Haasan's personal life who was contesting from Coimbatore South. His comments drew wide criticism. Makkal Needhi Maiam (MNM) lodged a complaint with Election Commission regarding the violation of the Model Code of Conduct for his speech. During the same campaign he passed lewd comments and slut shamed Nayanthara.

=== Allegations of sexual harassment ===
As part of the #MeToo movement in the Indian Tamil industry, in 2018, allegations of sexual harassment, sexual misconduct and inappropriate behaviour have been made against Radha Ravi. The allegations were brought to light by singer Chinmayi Sripada but accusers were allegedly silenced from filing official complaints. The singer was axed from the dubbing union, of which Radha Ravi is the president, for speaking up against him. Chinmayi claimed that Radha Ravi had expelled her from the dubbing union because she had exposed him in the #MeToo movement.

== Awards ==
Tamil Nadu State Film Awards

- Tamil Nadu State Film Award Special Prize – Solaikuyil (1989)
- Tamil Nadu State Film Award for Best Character Artiste (Male) – Oru Murai Sollividu (2004)

Edison Awards

- Edison Award for Best Character role (Male) – Iraivi (2016)
