= List of programs broadcast by Jaya TV =

This is the list of television programs currently and formerly broadcast by Jaya TV.

== Currently broadcast by Jaya TV ==
Devotional show

- Arul Neram
- Vaara Palan

=== Breakfast show ===
- Kaalai Malar

=== Cooking shows ===
- Suvaiyo Suvai
- Arusuvai Neram
- Enna Samayalo
- Kai Manam
- Rasikka Rusikka
- Cook with Kutties
- Gama Gama (Kaalai Malar segment)

=== Annual events ===
- Margazhi Utsavam

=== Comedy shows ===
- Comedy Gangsters

=== Talkshow ===
- Chai With Celebrity

Kids Show

- Vaalu Pasanga

=== Serials ===
- Palayathu Amman
- Chinthamani
- Thamarai
- Senthamarai
- Vennila

=== Returns ===
- Jayam
- Gettimelam
- Kairasi Kudubham
- Krishna Cottage

== Formerly broadcast ==
- Gopurangal Saivathillai
- Subramaniyapuram
- Sahana
- Shanthi Nilayam
- Akka
- Rudhram
- Alaipayuthe
- Jaiyam
- Krishna Cottage
- Roja
- Comedy Bazaar
- Veetukku Veetukku Looty
- Soundaravalli
- Ranga Vilas
- Poovum Poottum
- Adhe Kangal
- Aval Appadithan
- Carnatic Music Idol USA
- Maya
- Chithiram Pesudhadi
- Kaalabhairavan
- Kalki
- Anni
- Kudumbbam
- Kairasi Kudumbam
- Maayavi
- Ranga Vilas
- Vidathu Sirippu
- Vaidhegi
- Vanthale Maharasi
- Mannan Magal
- Girija MA
- Enge Brahmanan

=== Dubbed soap operas ===
- Periya Idathu Penn
- Poonkatru
- Sondhangal
- Jai Veera Hanuman
- Ramayanam
- Poomagal
- Priyamana Thozhi
- Sonnathu Neethanae
- Sree Durga Devi

=== Cooking shows ===
- Suvaiyo Suvai
- Arusuvai Neram
- Arokiya Unavu
- Neengalum Samaikalam
- Arusuvai Ithu Thani Suvai

=== Reality ===
- Action Superstar
- Unnai Arindhaal- with Varalaxmi Sarathkumar
- Vaanameh Yellai- with Apsara Reddy
- Jaya Super Singer South India
- Jaya Super Dancers
- Jaya Star Singer Season 1,2
- Thaka Thimi Tha
- Vaanam Vasappadum
- Nermugam
- Jil Jung Juk
- Chellame Chellam
- Iniya Illam
- Savaal
- Raagamaliga
- Muhurtha Neram
- Dial Jaya TV
- Housefull
- Raga Vaibhavam
- Visuvin Makkal Arangam
- Sokkuthae Manam
- Ennodu Paattu Paadungal
- Manadhodu Mano
- Kids Q
- Lights Camera Action Cut
- Kodiyin Kural
- A to Z Just for kids
- Vazhthugal
- Hasini-speaking film
- Ari and I
- Little Masters
- Rakamalika
- Tenkinnam
- Music cafe
- Koteeswari
- Jackpot (Season 1,2)
- Bhaktha Vijayam
- Mega Magalir Mattum
- Kichu Kichu.com
- Yen Eppadi Yaar
- Sema Scene Ma
- Take 5
- Jeyikkapovadhu Yaru
- Count Down
- Dhool
- Talk 2
- Oorvalam
- Movie No 1
- Quiz Time
- Cinema Cope
- Cinema Paarvai
- Vanamey Ellai
- Love 2k
- Yes or No
- Anantha Raagam
- Irulin oli
- Galatta Comedy
- Neela Maala
- Kadi Tv
- Veera Muzhakkam
- Vellithirai
- Pop Tucker

== List of movies ==
- Jana Nayagan
- Lingaa
- Baahubali: The Beginning
- Kaashmora
- 24
- I
- Iraivi
- Remo
- Joker
- Irudhi Suttru
- 36 Vayadhinile
- Thodari
- Kochadaiiyaan
- Lingaa
- Thirumanam Ennum Nikkah
- Pokkiri Raja
- Enga Chinna Rasa
- Azhagana Naatkal
- Azhagarsamy
- Chinna Thambi
- Orange Mittai
- Maryan
- Velayudham
- Kaththi
- Vedalam
- Arrambam
- Pasanga 2
- Darling 2
- Jithan 2
- Kattu Paya Sir Intha Kaali
- Kuppathu Raja
- Yennai Arindhaal
- Kadhalum Kadandhu Pogum
- Pettikadai
- Bhooloham
- Adhibar
- Jannal Oram
- Vallinam
- Maattrraan
- Neethane En Ponvasantham
- Kaaval
- Palakkattu Madhavan
- Vanthaan Vendraan
- Vellore Maavattam
- Nilaave Vaa
- Veetla Visheshanga
- Amma Vandhachu
- Eetti
- Alexander
- En Aasai Machan
- Dharma Chakkaram
- Illam
- Pulan Visaranai
- Thalattu Padava
- Bharathan
- Karuppu Nila
- Rajadurai
- Sakkarai Devan
- Simmasanam
- Poonthotta Kaavalkaaran
- Paattukku Oru Thalaivan
- En Aasai Machan
- Gandhi Pirantha Mann
- Adhu
- Varuvaan Manikandan
- Thendral Thodatha Malar
- Avvai Shanmugi
- Poove Pen Poove
- Asokavanam
- Kasi
- Love Marriage
- Kadal Pookkal
- Iruvar
- Bharathi
- Ponnana Neram
- Kadhal Rojavae
- Nagalingam
- Unnai Kann Theduthey
- Kunguma Chimil
- Ammaiyappan
- Dhaya
- Saptham
- Nettru Varai Nee Yaaro Naan Yaaro
- Guruvamma
- Karmegam
- Namma Veetu Kalyanam
- Jjunction
- Album
- University
- Game
- Jaya
- Virumbugiren
- Kadhal Virus
- H2o Kaveri
- Pop Corn
- Vaseegara
- Sena
- Dum
- Punnagai Poove
- Lesa Lesa
- Parasuram
- Paarai
- Ice
- Thayumanavan
- Vikadan
- Eera Nilam
- Kaakha Kaakha
- Diwan
- Success
- Unnai Charanadaindhen
- Three Roses
- Vadakku Vaasal
- Ottran
- Anjaneya
- Nadhi Karaiyinile
- Soori
- Indru
- Sindhamal Sitharamal
- Autograph
- Aarumugasaamy
- Pethi Sollai Thattathe
- Udhaya
- Kadhal Dot Com
- Kavidhai
- Maanasthan
- Singara Chennai
- Arivumani
- Oru Murai Sollividu
- Vishwa Thulasi
- Dreams
- Attagasam
- Jaisurya
- Meesai Madhavan
- Ramakrishna
- Remote
- Image
- Iyer IPS
- Kannadi Pookal
- Sukran
- Kadhal Seiya Virumbu
- Karagattakkari
- Sevvel
- Priyasakhi
- Sachein
- Mumbai Xpress
- Girivalam
- Power of Women
- Ullam Ketkumae
- Pon Megalai
- Chinna
- Daas
- Ponniyin Selvan
- Chidambarathil Oru Appasamy
- Kalaiyatha Ninaivugal
- Kangalin Vaarthaigal
- Thotti Jaya
- Maayavi
- Ji
- Chanakya
- Aayudham
- Mazhai
- Madhurey
- Sivakasi
- Kasthuri Maan
- Kanda Naal Mudhal
- Kana Kandaen
- Thavamai Thavamirundhu
- Aahaa Enna Porutham
- Neethane En Ponvasantham
- Muppozhudhum Un Karpanaigal
- Kutty
- Nadigan
- Vallal
- Pick Pocket
- Thodari
- Bramma
- Singaravelan
- Rajadhi Raja
- Thozhar Pandian
- Villadhi Villain
- Ullathai Allitha
- Mettukudi
- Sivasakthi
- Senathipathi
- Vivaramana Aalu
- Sema Ragalai
- Paramasivan
- Dishyum
- Udan Pirappu
- Nizhalgal
- Alaigal Oivathillai
- Valibamey Vaa Vaa
- Oru Kaidhiyin Diary
- Muthal Mariyathai
- Kadalora Kavithaigal
- Vedham Pudhithu
- Kodi Parakuthu
- En Uyir Thozhan
- Pudhu Nellu Pudhu Naathu
- Nadodi Thendral
- Captain Magal
- Kizhakku Cheemayile
- Karuththamma
- Tamizh Selvan
- Chithiram Pesuthadi
- June R
- Kodambakkam
- Thalai Nagaram
- Pudhupettai
- Kaivantha Kalai
- Parijatham
- Thalaimagan
- Rendu
- Innisai Mazhai
- Kalyana Kacheri
- Kadavulin Theerppu
- Karpoora Mullai
- Varusham 16
- Unnale Unnale
- Rasukutty
- Aararo Aariraro
- Idhu Namma Aalu
- Guru Paarvai
- Pullakuttikaran
- Sugamana Sumaigal
- Kumbakarai Thangaiah
- Ellam Inba Mayyam
- Azhagiya Theeye
- Marumagan
- Dhavani Kanavugal
- Oomai Janangal
- Agal Vilakku
- Medhai
- Kaadhal Devathai
- Uzhavan
- Yaar?
- Dhikku Theriyadha Kaattil
- Suriya Paarvai
- Thotta Chinungi
- Subash
- Kathai Kathaiyam Kaaranamam
- Pandiyanin Rajyathil
- Vietnam Veedu
- Aayirathil Oruvan
- Murai Maman
- Moovendhar
- Manandhal Mahadevan
- Veettula Raman Velila Krishnan
- Unnai Thedi
- Maryan
- Aarathi Edungadi
- Mannavaru Chinnavaru
- Anbulla Kadhalukku
- Kalar Kanavugal
- Priyamudan
- Sivappu Nila
- Kathirunda Kadhal
- Vaimaye Vellum
- Janakiraman
- Aranmanai Kaavalan
- Mr. Madras
- Veluchami
- Gokulathil Seethai
- Veeram Vilanja Mannu
- Unnidathil Ennai Koduthen
- Aattanayagann
- Uthama Raasa
- Jallikattu Kaalai
- Chinna Poove Mella Pesu
- Gopura Vasalile
- Theertha Karaiyinile
- Thayagam
- Michael Madana Kama Rajan
- Maharasan
- Musthaffaa
- Rajali
- Thirumoorthy
- Asuran
- Pon Vilangu
- Idhaya Thamarai
- Sathan Sollai Thattathe
- Amman Kovil Thiruvizha
- Sami Potta Mudichu
- Pudhiya Raagam
- Vaasalil Oru Vennila
- Kalicharan
- Vaidehi Vandhachu
- Pandithurai
- Chinna Thayee
- Chinna Marumagal
- Rasukutty
- Idhu Namma Bhoomi
- Chinna Muthu
- Ilaignar Ani
- Sundara Kandam
- Kalikaalam
- Magudam
- Annai Vayal
- Senthamizh Paattu
- Thirumathi Palanisamy
- Chinna Kannamma
- Manikuyil
- Rasigan
- Bramma
- Magudikkaran
