= Maruthani =

- Directed by: Ramarajan
- Produced by: P. Jayaraj
- Starring: Pandiyan; Shobana
- Cinematography: K. S. Selvaraj
- Edited by: R. Bhaskaran
- Music by: Gangai Amaran
- Production company: J. R. Art Films
- Release date: 1 September 1985
- Country: India
- Language: Tamil

Maruthani (transl. Henna) is a 1985 Indian Tamil-language film, directed by Ramarajan and produced by P. Jayaraj. The film stars Pandiyan and Shobana, with Goundamani, S. S. Chandran, Janagaraj, Senthil and Sulakshana in supporting roles. It was released on 1 September 1985.

== Cast ==
- Pandiyan
- Shobana as Marudhani
- Goundamani
- S. S. Chandran
- Janagaraj
- Senthil as Dingu
- Sulakshana
- Karai Subbaiya

== Production ==
Ramarajan initially approached Kanaka, then aged 11, to play the female lead, but she refused as she was then not interested in pursuing an acting career; the role went to Shobana. While shooting a scene at Salem, Tamil Nadu where Pandiyan bathes in falls with ropes tied from the tree, he lost control and was caught in the spiral of falls. He was immediately rescued by the crew.

== Soundtrack ==
The music was composed by Gangai Amaran.

Track listing
No.	Title	Lyrics	Singer(s)	Length
1.	"Vilakku Vaicha"	Vaali	P. Jayachandran, P. Susheela	4:23
2.	"Marudhaniya"	Gangai Amaran	S. P. Sailaja, Uma Ramanan	4:33
3.	"Manjalukku"	Pulamaipithan	S. Janaki, Gangai Amaran	3:27
4.	"Machanukku"	Vairamuthu	Gangai Amaran, P. Susheela	4:42
Total length:				17:05

== Critical reception ==
Anna praised Ramarajan for narrating a simple plot in an entertaining manner while also praising the acting of Pandiyan and Shobana, humour and music. Jayamanmadhan of Kalki felt Pandiyan trying hard to attain star status and panning felt Janagaraj's humour villainy was no use while panning Goundamani and Senthil's humour.
