= Solaikuyil =

- Poster
- Directed by: Rajan
- Written by: Rajan
- Produced by: Azhagan Tamilmani
- Starring: Karthik; Ragini
- Cinematography: Nambi
- Edited by: Deva
- Music by: M. S. Murari
- Production company: Nachiyar Movies
- Release date: 3 June 1989
- Country: India
- Language: Tamil

Solaikuyil is a 1989 Indian Tamil-language action thriller film written and directed by Rajan, starring Karthik and Ragini. The film was released on 3 June 1989.

== Plot ==
Maruthu enters the town of Mulimalai, introducing himself as the grandson of the respected Mookaiya Devar, who left for Singapore years ago. While the others accept his claim, the village guardsman, Maayandi, is suspicious. Maruthu is drawn to the withdrawn Ponnuthaye. Her brother, Kaali, was convicted of raping and killing Valli, her friend. Kaali was sentenced to death but has escaped and is now on the run. Ponnuthayee has no one other family except Maayandi, who was Kaali's friend and sees her as a sister.

Maruthu and Ponnuthaayee fall in love, and Maayandi, suspicious of Maruthu, makes his disapproval clear. The protagonist investigates and learns that Valli's intended accidentally killed her when he attempted to rape her and placed the blame on Kaali, who is now exonerated, but still missing. The villagers are grateful for Maruthu's help and arrange for his wedding to Ponnuthayee. Maayandi, while grateful for Maruthu's help, still doubts him and makes it clear that he does not believe Kaali will ever return. When it is confirmed that the formerly accused has been murdered, the town is once again thrown into confusion and must resolve the mystery of his murder as well as Maruthu's true origins.

== Cast ==
- Karthik as Maruthu
- Ragini as Ponnuthaayee
- Radha Ravi as Maayandi (Thalaiyari)
- Pandian as Kaali
- S. S. Chandran as Mamu
- Gandhimathi as Angamma
- Kovai Sarala as Punitha
- Kuyili as Valli
- K. K. Soundar as Village President
- Raghavi
- Thyagu as Valli's intended
- Ponvannan
- Swaminathan as Peter, Gardener
- Sivaraman as Paramasivam
- Typist Gopu as Villageman
- Azhagu as Henchman

== Production ==
The film was launched on 12 July 1987 at AVM recording studios. The film was primarily shot at Ooty. During the production, the lead pair, Karthik and Ragini, got married.

== Soundtrack ==
The soundtrack was composed by M. S. Murari.

Track listing
No.	Title	Lyrics	Singer(s)	Length
1.	"Yerikkarai Orathile"	Gangai Amaran	Gangai Amaran, S. P. Sailaja
2.	"Kannula Nikkudhu Nenjula"	Kanmani Subbu	S. P. Balasubrahmanyam, Lalitha
3.	"Karugamani Iru Saradu"		K. S. Chithra, Prabakar
4.	"Kottunga Ketti Melam"	Vaali	S. P. Balasubrahmanyam
5.	"Chinnansirusugal Kannam"	Chidambaranathan	Uma Ramanan, Prabakar
6.	"Poongatre Kelayo"	Muthulingam	K. S. Chithra
7.	"Malainattu Machane"	Kuruvikarambai Shanmugam	K. S. Chithra
8.	"Vasantha Poongatre Konjam"	Ilavenil	S. P. Balasubrahmanyam

== Reception ==
P. S. S. of Kalki criticized those responsible for adding a tragic romantic layer to the detective mystery, while appreciating the thrilling plot until the end, along with the meaningful dialogues. Radha Ravi won the Tamil Nadu State Film Award Special Prize.
