= Chinnan Chirusugal =

- Theatrical release poster
- Directed by: Rama Narayanan
- Written by: Rama Narayanan
- Produced by: Radha Narayanan
- Starring: Mohan; Sulakshana; Prabhu
- Cinematography: Lokesh
- Edited by: Gouthaman
- Music by: K. V. Mahadevan
- Production company: Thenandal Films
- Release date: 11 December 1982
- Country: India
- Language: Tamil

Chinnan Chirusugal (transl. The young ones) is a 1982 Indian Tamil-language drama film written and directed by Rama Narayanan. The film stars Mohan and Sulakshana, with S. S. Chandran, Loose Mohan, Vennira Aadai Moorthy, Prabhu and V. K. Ramasamy in supporting roles. It was released on 11 December 1982.

== Cast ==
- Mohan as Mohan
- Sulakshana as Shobha
- S. S. Chandran
- Loose Mohan
- Vennira Aadai Moorthy
- Prabhu as Prabhu
- V. K. Ramasamy
- Silk Smitha

== Soundtrack ==
The soundtrack was composed by K. V. Mahadevan.

Track listing
| No. | Title | Lyrics | Singer(s) | Length |
|---|---|---|---|---|
| 1. | "Aaha Oho" | Vaali | S. P. Balasubrahmanyam, S. Janaki |
| 2. | "Maaman Veettu Mayile" | Vairamuthu | Malaysia Vasudevan |
| 3. | "Entha Iravu" | Kamakodiyan | S. P. Balasubrahmanyam |
| 4. | "Dialogues" | Rama Narayanan | Prabhu, Mohan, Sulakshana |

== Release and reception ==
Chinnan Chirusugal was passed with an "A" (adults only) certificate by the Central Board of Film Certification without any cuts, and was released on 11 December 1982. Ananda Vikatan said the best character in the film was Prabhu, but was dismayed since he is introduced only mid-way through the story. Thiraignani of Kalki panned Mohan's acting, Moorthy's humour as vulgar and Sulakshana's character design. Balumani of Anna praised the acting of cast, Moorthy's humour and Mahadevan's music but found nothing great about the direction and called it just ordinary film.
