= Sulakshana (actress) =

Indian actress

- Born: Sridevi; Rajamahendravaram (Rajahmundry), Andhra Pradesh
- Occupation: Actress
- Years active: 1980–1994; 2001–present
- Spouse: Gopikrishnan
- Children: 3

Sulakshana is an Indian actress who has acted in Tamil, Malayalam, Telugu, and Kannada films and serials. She started at the age of two and half playing child Krishna in Kaaviya Thalaivi (credited as Dolly). After that she acted in Thulabharam as child artist in Tamil, Telugu, Malayalam, Hindi (credited as Rajani).

She played her first leading role in the Telugu film Subhodayam opposite Chandra Mohan (1980). Her next film was with Kannada superstar Dr. Rajkumar. Her third film was K. Bhagyaraj's Thooral Ninnu Pochi. Sulakshan has acted in over 450 films ever since.

After a 12 year-break from the film industry, Sulakshana reentered the industry with the teleserial Sahana.

== Personal life ==
She was born in Rajamahendravaram (Rajahmundry), Andhra Pradesh. She is married to director Gopikrishnan, son of famous music director M. S. Viswanathan and they have three children. After a 12 year-break from the film industry, Sulakshana reentered the industry with the teleserial Sahana.

== Partial filmography ==
=== Tamil ===
Year	Film	Role	Notes
1968	Thulabharam		Child artiste
1970	Kaaviya Thalaivi		Child artiste
1971	Pudhiya Vazhkai		Child artiste
1982	Thooral Ninnu Pochchu	Mangalam	Tamil debut as heroine
1982	Thambathyam Oru Sangitam		
1982	Kannodu Kann		
1982	Antha Rathirikku Satchi Illai		
1982	Archanai Pookal		
1982	Boom Boom Maadu		
1982	Chinnan Chirusugal		
1983	Indru Nee Nalai Naan		
1983	Yugadharmam		
1983	Idhu Enga Naadu		
1983	Thoongadhey Thambi Thoongadhey		
1983	Subha Muhurtham		
1983	Yamirukka Bayamen		
1983	Aayiram Nilave Vaa		
1983	Miruthanga Chakravarthi		
1983	Brimmacharigal		
1983	Puththisali Paithiangal		
1984	Pozhudhu Vidinjachu		
1984	Mann Soru		
1984	Rajathanthiram		
1984	Amma Irukka		
1984	Anbulla Rajinikanth		
1984	Thalayanai Mandhiram		
1984	Thambikku Entha Ooru		
1984	Kuva Kuva Vaathugal		
1984	January One		
1985	Irandu Manam		
1985	Ketti Melam		
1985	Erimalai		
1985	Raja Gopuram		
1985	Amutha Gaanam		
1985	Oru Malarin Payanam		
1985	Marudhani		
1985	Raja Rishi		
1985	Vilaangu Meen		
1985	Aasha		
1985	Rajathi Rojakili		
1985	Sindhu Bhairavi		
1986	Dharma Pathni		
1986	Sigappu Malargal		
1986	Selvaakku		
1986	Mel Maruvathoor Arpudhangal		
1986	Poi Mugangal		
1986	Murattu Karangal		
1986	Jigujigu Rail		
1986	Namma Ooru Nalla Ooru		
1987	Ondru Engal Jaathiye		
1987	Ini Oru Sudhanthiram		
1987	Kaalam Marudhu		
1987	Neethikku Thandanai		
1987	Vilangu		
1988	Sivapputhaali		
1988	Katha Nayagan		
1988	Therkkathi Kallan		
1990	Paattukku Naan Adimai		
1990	Vaigasi Poranthachu		
1990	Aarathi Edungadi		
1990	Kizhakku Vasal		
1990	Naanum Indha Ooruthan		
1990	Nee Sirithal Deepavali		
1991	Naadu Adhai Naadu		
1991	Mill Thozhilali		
1991	Naattai Thirudathey		
1991	Nee Pathi Naan Pathi		
1991	Pondatti Pondattithan		
1991	Putham Puthu Payanam		
1991	Chinna Thambi		
1991	Pondatti Pondattidhan		
1992	Bramachari		
1992	Aavarampoo		
1992	Thambi Pondatti		
1993	Aadhityan		
1993	Nam Nattu Rajakkal		
1994	Kaviyam		
2004	Machi		
2005	Chinna		
2006	Unnai Naan		
2007	Pirappu		
2008	Thodakkam		
2008	Inba		
2012	Kondaan Koduthaan		
2018	Ghajinikanth		

=== Malayalam ===
Year	Film	Role	Notes
1968	Thulabharam		Child artiste
1986	Nyayavidhi	Bhaimi	
1986	Pratheykam Sradikkuka	Nirmala	
1986	Poomukapadil Ninneyum Kathu	Ammukutty	
1986	Hello My Dear Wrong Number		
1987	Ivide Ellaravarkkum Sukam		
1987	Cheppu	Lakshmi	
1987	Thoovanathumbikal	Malini	
1988	Moonnam Pakkam	Mrs. Kurup	
1989	Vandanam	Laxmi	
1989	Swagatham	Betty Francis	
1990	Cheriya Lokavum Valiya Manushyarum		
1990	Ee Thanutha Veluppan Kalathu	Kuwait Mani's wife	
1990	Kadathanadan Ambadi	Ayisha	
1990	Oliyambukal	Leelamma	
1990	Sunday 7 PM	Pushpa	
1991	Njan Gandharvan	Bhama's mother	
1991	Nayam Vyakthamakkunnu	Liza	
2012	Ezham Suryan	Gopika's mother	
2012	No. 66 Madhura Bus	Varkey's wife	

=== Telugu ===
Year	Film	Role	Notes
1969	Manushulu Marali		Child artiste
1971	Amaayakuraalu	Young Jothi	Child artiste
1972	Vamsoddharakudu		Child artiste
1972	Shanthi Nilayam		Child artiste
1972	Pandanti Kapuram		Child artiste
1972	Kattula Rattayya		Child artiste
1973	Jeevitham		Child artiste
1973	Sarada		Child artiste
1976	Padi Pantalu	Roja	Child artiste
1980	Subhodhayam		
1982	Prema Nakshatram		
1983	Maa Intaina Katha		
1983	Maa Inti Premayanam		
1984	Nayavidhi		
1984	Allulu Vasthunnaru		
1985	Maya Mohini		
1987	Dabbevariki Chedu		
2010	1940 Lo Oka Gramam		

=== Kannada ===
Year	Film	Role	Notes
1981	Havina Hede		
1981	Devara Aata		
1982	Adrushtavanta		
1985	Kadina Raja		
1985	Maha Purusha	Cameo	
1986	December 31		
2013	Attahasa		

=== Hindi ===
1. Samaj Ko Badal Dalo (1970)

=== Voice artist ===
1. Revathi for Punnagai Mannan (1986)
2. Amala for Mythili Ennai Kaathali (1986)

== Television career ==
Serials

Year	Title	Role	Language	Channel
1990	Anbulla Amma		Tamil	Doordarshan
2003–2004	Sahana	Bhairavi JKB	Tamil	Jaya TV
2003–2004	Alai Osai		Tamil	Sun TV
2004–2006	Kanavarukaaga	Sarala	Tamil	Sun TV
2005–2007	Malargal	Sivagami	Tamil	Sun TV
2005	Kadamattathu Kathanar(Tv series)	Eli Chettathy	Malayalam	Asianet
2007–2009	Magal	Savithri	Tamil	Sun TV
2008–2009	Gokulathil Seethai		Tamil	Kalaignar TV
2009–2011	Maharani	Yamuna	Tamil	Vijay TV
2010–2011	Adi Parasakthi		Tamil	Vijay TV
2010–2011	Mundhanai Mudichu	Krishnaveni	Tamil	Sun TV
2011–2012	Thangam	Dhanam	Tamil	Sun TV
2011	Mayamadhavam		Malayalam	Surya TV
2011-2016	Best of Luck Nikki	Rolli Aunty	Hindi	Disney India
2012-2013	The Suite Life of Karan & Kabir	Shobhaji	Hindi	Disney India
2012–2014	Merku Mambalathil Oru Kaadhal		Tamil	Zee Tamil
2012–2013	Azhagi	Chandra	Tamil	Sun TV
2013–2017	Deivam Thandha Veedu	Sumithra	Tamil	Vijay TV
2015–2017	Lakshmi Vanthachu	Valliammai	Tamil	Zee Tamil
2018–2020	Devathaiyai Kanden	Meenakshi	Tamil	Zee Tamil
2018–2019	Aranmanai Kili	Thayamma	Tamil	Star Vijay
2019–2020	Raasathi	Alamelu	Tamil	Sun TV
2020–2023	Kannana Kanne	Dhanalakshmi	Tamil	Sun TV
2021	Anb Vaa	Dhanalakshmi	Tamil	Sun TV
2020–2021	Pandian Stores	Raasathi	Tamil	Star Vijay
2023	Bhavana	Rajeshwari	Malayalam	Surya TV

Shows

Year	Title	Role	Language	Channel
2014	Celebrity Kitchen	Guest	Tamil	Puthuyugam TV
2020	Vanakkam Tamizha	Guest	Tamil	Sun TV
2021	Ettam Arivu	Herself	Tamil	Sun TV
