= Sri Krishna Leela (1977 film) =

- DVD cover
- Directed by: A. P. Nagarajan
- Written by: A. P. Nagarajan
- Produced by: R. M. Subramaniyam
- Starring: Sivakumar; Jayalalithaa; Srividya; Nagesh
- Cinematography: W. R. Subba Rao; K. S. Prasanth
- Edited by: T. Vijayarangam
- Music by: S. V. Venkatraman
- Production company: Sri Umaiyambikai Pictures
- Release date: 26 October 1977
- Running time: 130 minutes
- Country: India
- Language: Tamil

Sri Krishna Leela (transl. The Play of Lord Krishna) is a 1977 Indian Tamil-language Hindu mythological film, written and directed by A. P. Nagarajan. The film was produced by R. M. Subramaniyam, with music from S. V. Venkatraman. Sivakumar starred in the title role with Jayalalithaa, Srividya, Nagesh, R. S. Manohar taking supporting roles. This also marked Jayalalithaa's last film during the 70s era. The film failed at the box-office which led Sivakumar to take a decision of not portraying godly roles ever again.

== Cast ==
- Sivakumar as Lord Vishnu / Lord Krishna
- T. R. Mahalingam as Naratha Muni
- Srividya as Goddess Lakshmi
- Jayalalithaa as Sathyabhama
- R. S. Manohar as Kamsa
- C. R. Vijayakumari as Devaki (Lord Krishna Mother)
- Major Sundararajan as Vasudevan (Lord Krishna Father)
- V. S. Raghavan as Ugrasena
- Nagesh as Sudhama
- S. Varalakshmi as Yasodha
- Suruli Rajan as Kamsan's Henchman (1)
- Typist Gopu as Kamsan's Henchman (2)
- Ennatha Kannaiya as Kamsan's Henchman (3)
- S. Rama Rao
- Manorama
- Sachu
- Gandhimathi
- A. Sakunthala as Kamsan's Palace Dancer
- Shanmugasundari
- V. R. Thilagam
- "Achcho" Chithra
- Peeli Sivam
- Siththan
- Thangaraj
- Shanthi Kumar
- Vasntha Kumar
- Rajavelu
- Master Krishnan as Little Balaraman

== Soundtrack ==
Music was by S. V. Venkatraman and lyrics were written by Kannadasan, K. D. Santhanam, Poovai Senkuttuvan and Ra. Pazhanisamy.

Song	Singers
"Naarananae Unathu"	T. R. Mahalingam
"Ulagam Engum"	L. R. Eswari
"Nalla Naal Indru"	S. Varalakshmi
"Vilayaattu Pillaiyadi Kannan"	Vani Jayaram
"Vaigunda Vaasan"	A. Veeraswami
"Mohana Kannan Murali"	Uma Ramanan A. V. Ramanan
"Kaami Sathyabama"	S. P. Balasubrahmanyam
"Anbe"	Soolamangalam Rajalakshmi T. V. Rathnam
"Naarananae Unathu"	T. R. Mahalingam
