= Purushan Enakku Arasan =

- Title card
- Directed by: Rama Narayanan
- Screenplay by: Rama Narayanan
- Story by: Gopu–Babu
- Produced by: S. S. Chandran
- Starring: Pandiarajan; Kanaka; S. S. Chandran; Pallavi
- Cinematography: N. K. Viswanathan
- Edited by: Rajkeerthi
- Music by: Shankar–Ganesh
- Production company: Chinni Cine Circuits
- Release date: 11 December 1992
- Running time: 110 minutes
- Country: India
- Language: Tamil

Purushan Enakku Arasan (transl. Husband is my ruler) is a 1992 Indian Tamil-language comedy film directed by Rama Narayanan and produced by S. S. Chandran. The film stars Pandiarajan, Kanaka, Chandran and Pallavi. It was released on 11 December 1992.

== Plot ==
Cheenu and Uma love each other but will not marry as the astrologer predicts that his first wife will die soon. So he marries Kalpana who claims to be sick.

== Cast ==
- Pandiarajan
- Kanaka
- S. S. Chandran
- Pallavi
- Nagesh
- Chandrasekhar
- Gandhimathi
- Vennira Aadai Moorthy
- Ra. Sankaran
- Kovai Sarala
- Chinni Jayanth
- Radha Ravi
- Oru Viral Krishna Rao
- Omakuchi Narasimhan

== Soundtrack ==
The music was composed by Shankar–Ganesh lyrics written by Vaali,pulamaipithan.

Track listing
No.	Title	Singer(s)	Length
1.	"Endhiri Endhiri Mama"	K. S. Chithra	4:02
2.	"Thorandhadhu Thorandhadhu"	P.Jayachandran, P.Susheela	3:29
3.	"Vaazhavidu Sami Vaazhavidu"	Malaysia Vasudevan	3:49
Total length:			11:20

== Reception ==
Malini Mannath of The Indian Express wrote, "Pandiarajan being the hero, the script is geared to suit his image and what results is a light-hearted comedy at times funny and many times not". C. R. K. of Kalki praised the director, writer and star cast.
