= January 1 (film) =

- Poster
- Directed by: Manivannan
- Written by: Manivannan
- Produced by: P. Nageswara Rao
- Starring: Vijayakanth; Sulakshana; Sathyaraj; Tara
- Cinematography: A. Sabapathy
- Edited by: B. Kanthasamy
- Music by: Ilaiyaraaja
- Production company: PNR Pictures
- Release date: 6 December 1984
- Running time: 107 minutes
- Country: India
- Language: Tamil

January 1 is a 1984 Indian Tamil-language film written and directed by Manivannan. The film stars Vijayakanth, Sulakshana, Sathyaraj and Tara. It was released on 6 December 1984, and became a success.

== Plot ==
The plot follows a courageous police inspector who investigates several mysterious murders rocking the city.

== Cast ==
- Vijayakanth
- Sulakshana
- Sathyaraj
- Tara
- Janagaraj
- Anuradha
- Vinu Chakravarthy
- Gandhimathi
- Senthil
- Chinni Jayanth
- Loose Mohan
- Oru Viral Krishna Rao
- Periya Karuppu Thevar
- Super Subbarayan

== Production ==
January 1 was the first of several collaborations between Manivannan and Sathyaraj.

== Soundtrack ==
The music was composed by Ilaiyaraaja. The song "Nee Oru Pathini Illai" attained popularity.

| Song | Singers | Lyrics |
|---|---|---|
| Aasai Uchathile | Veeramani | Gangai Amaran |
| Nee Oru Pathini Illai | Grubb Singh, S.P. Sailaja, S. P. Balasubrahmanyam | Gangai Amaran |
| Puthandu Poothathu Indru | S. Janaki | Na. Kamarasan |
| Iniya Kaaman Pandigai | S. Janaki, Malaysia Vasudevan | Vairamuthu |

== Release and reception ==
January 1 was released on 6 December 1984. Jayamanmadhan of Kalki gave the film a negative review, criticising the lack of masala, story and thrills but appreciated the last ten minutes. Despite this, it became a success.
