= Mill Thozhilali =

- Directed by: A. Jagannathan
- Written by: L. S. N. Ravi
- Produced by: Vijayamuralee; S. Selvi; P. Pandian
- Starring: Ramarajan; Aishwarya; Chandrasekhar; Sulakshana
- Cinematography: B. Kalaischelvan
- Edited by: R. Baskaran
- Music by: Deva
- Production company: Kavibharathi Creations
- Release date: 12 May 1991
- Country: India
- Language: Tamil

Mill Thozhilali (transl. Mill Worker) is a 1991 Indian Tamil-language film, directed by A. Jagannathan and written by L. S. N. Ravi. The film stars Ramarajan, Aishwarya, Chandrasekhar and Sulakshana. It was released on 12 May 1991.

== Cast ==
- Ramarajan as Balu
- Aishwarya
- Chandrasekhar as Pazhanisamy
- Sulakshana
- Livingston as Prakash
- Jaishankar
- Senthil
- Kovai Sarala
- Kumarimuthu
- A. V. Ramanan in a Friendly Appearance
- Oru Viral Krishna Rao

== Soundtrack ==
The music was composed by Deva, with lyrics by Kalidasan.

1. "Kaalam Ini Maari Vidum..." – K. S. Chithra, Malaysia Vasudevan
2. "Kalam Varum Kalam..." – Malaysia Vasudevan
3. "Kalyana Solai Kuyile..." – K. J. Yesudas, Uma Ramanan
4. "Noorandu Kaalam..." – Mano
5. "Vaadi En Annakiliye..." – Malaysia Vasudevan
