= Kalki (TV series) =

- Genre: Soap opera Drama
- Written by: Khushbu
- Directed by: K. Natraj
- Creative director: Kushboo Sundar
- Starring: Kushboo Sundar; Abhishek; Shyam Ganesh
- Theme music composer: D. Imman (Title Song); Anbuchelvan (Background Score)
- Opening theme: "Kalki Kalki"; Hariharan (Vocal); Pa. Vijay (Lyrics)
- Country of origin: India
- Original language: Tamil
- No. of seasons: 3
- No. of episodes: 711

Production
- Producer: Kushboo Sundar
- Camera setup: Multi-camera
- Running time: approx. 20-22 minutes per episode
- Production company: Avni Telemedia

Original release
- Network: Jaya TV
- Release: 5 January 2004 – 16 April 2007

Kalki was an Indian Tamil-language soap opera that aired on Jaya TV. The show is produced by Avni Telemedia and also the story writer, creative head and producer by Khusbhu Sundar. This was directed K. Natraj. Tamil Film actress Kushboo Sundar acted with Abhishek, Shyam Ganesh, Pooja, Gandhimathi, Delhi Ganesh, Aravind Akash and Vivek Anand

== Plot ==
A woman named Kalki (Khusbhu Sundar) falls in love with multimillionaire Mano (Abhishek). With the permission of Mano's family, they get married, and Kalki takes part in Mano's businesses. Later Mano learns that he has cancer and will die soon; after he does, Kalki marries Mano's younger brother (Shyam Ganesh) and continues to run the family business.

== Cast ==
- Kushboo Sundar as Kalki
- Abhishek as Mano
- Shyam Ganesh
- Nithya Ravindran
- Vivek Anand as Dharani
- Mano
- Pooja Lokesh
- Vennira Aadai Nirmala
- Y. Vijaya
- Geetha bapu
- A.R.S
- Vanthana
- Aravind Akash
- Rajkanth
- Delhi Ganesh
- Gandhimathi
- M.S. Viswanathan

== Awards ==
- Best Actress – Khushbu for Kalki

== See also ==
- List of programs broadcast by Jaya TV
