= Pengal Veettin Kangal =

- Poster
- Directed by: T. P. Gajendran
- Screenplay by: T. P. Gajendran
- Dialogue by: Vaali
- Story by: T. P. Gajendran
- Produced by: K. R. Gangadharan
- Starring: S. S. Chandran; K. R. Vijaya
- Cinematography: Baby Philips
- Edited by: Ganesh–Kumar
- Music by: Shankar–Ganesh
- Production company: KRG Movies International
- Release date: 10 March 1990
- Country: India
- Language: Tamil

Pengal Veettin Kangal (transl. Women are the eyes of the house) is a 1990 Indian Tamil-language drama film directed and co-written by T. P. Gajendran. The film stars S. S. Chandran and K. R. Vijaya, leading an ensemble cast which includes Pandiyan, Chandrasekhar, Anand Babu, Urvashi, Pallavi, Vaishnavi and Dilip. It was released on 10 March 1990.

== Plot ==
Dhanalakshmi, a tehsildar, and her husband Kanagalingam have five daughters. During the marriage of their first daughter, the groom's party offers to foot the bill for the marriage saying that they consider it their privilege to do so. However, after the marriage is solemnised, the groom's father furnishes a bill for the amount he spent and asks Kanagalingam to pay up. When Dhanalakshmi reprimands him for his naivety, an angered Kanagalingam swears he will get his other daughters married without paying dowry. His daughters make the task easy for him by falling in love. Kanagalingam somehow manages to finalise their marriages. But his travails do not end. All the daughters return home following problems in their in-law's households. However, Dhanalakshmi is not disheartened. She secures jobs for her daughters and makes them financially independent and at the same time working towards sending them back to their husband's homes. Whether Dhanalakshmi succeeds in her endeavours or not forms the crux of the story.

== Cast ==
- S. S. Chandran as Kanagalingam
- K. R. Vijaya as Dhanalakshmi
- Pandiyan as Jeeva
- Chandrasekhar
- Anand Babu as Prakash
- Urvashi
- Pallavi
- Vaishnavi
- Dilip
- Latha
- Charle
- Kuladeivam Rajagopal
- V. Gopalakrishnan
- K. K. Soundar
- Bheeman Raghu
- Krishnamoorthy
- Kovai Anuradha

== Production ==
Gajendran had written the lead role with his mentor, actor and filmmaker Visu in mind. Visu however refused, urging Gajendran to forge his own path rather than remain in Visu's shadow, and successfully recommended S. S. Chandran for the role.

== Soundtrack ==
The music was composed by Shankar–Ganesh, with lyrics by Vaali.

Track listing
No.	Title	Singer(s)	Length
1.	"Pagalalla Ithu Pagalalla"	Mano, K. S. Chithra	4:23
2.	"Aambailaikku"	S. P. Sailaja	4:47
3.	"Pengal Veettin Kangal"	P. Susheela	3:41
4.	"Yaaru Petha Pillai"	Malaysia Vasudevan	4:17
5.	"Saalaiyile Rendu Maadu"	Mano, Suja Radhakrishnan	3:43
Total length:			19:51

== Release and reception ==
Pengal Veettin Kangal was released on 10 March 1990. C. R. K. of Kalki praised Chandran's acting and Vaali's dialogues but felt the film and some scenes reminded him of a certain director and concluded calling Gajendran a perfect heir to him. It won the Tamil Nadu government's ₹1 lakh (equivalent to ₹7.7 lakh or US$8,000 in 2023) award for low budget films.
