= Ranga Vilas =

- ரெங்கவிலாஸ்
- Genre: Soap opera
- Written by: [L.R.SUNDARAPANDI]
- Directed by: Mani Bharathi
- Starring: Jayachitra; Radha Ravi; Vadivukkarasi; Delhi Kumar; Poovilangu Mohan; Sailatha; Sathish; Anuradha Krishnamurthy
- Country of origin: India
- Original language: Tamil
- No. of seasons: 1
- No. of episodes: 109

Production
- Camera setup: Multi-camera
- Running time: approx. 20-22 minutes per episode

Original release
- Network: Jaya TV
- Release: 9 September 2013 – 14 February 2014

Ranga Vilas (Tamil: ரெங்கவிலாஸ்) is a 2013 soap opera starring Jayachitra, Radha Ravi, Vadivukkarasi, Delhi Kumar, Poovilangu Mohan, Sailatha, Sathish, Anuradha Krishnamurthy and directed by Mani Bharathi. It premiered on Jaya TV every Monday to Friday at 21:00 (IST) on 9 September 2013 to 14 February 2014 for 109 episodes. The show focuses on a fictional Iyengar family in Srirangam.

== Cast ==
=== Main cast ===
- Jayachitra
- Radha Ravi
- Vadivukkarasi
- Delhi Kumar
- Poovilangu Mohan
- Anuradha Krishnamurthy as Rajam

=== Supporting ===
- Sailatha as Nanthini
- Sathish
- Udhay as Santhosh
- Tharunkumar
- Rani as Varalakshmi alias Varu
- Kumareshan
- Mahalakshmi as Ishaka
- Sri Vithiya
- Rekha Suresh

== Casting ==
The series is an Iyengar family melodrama with Jayachitra playing the lead female role. Jayachitra making her comeback after 15 years, and Radha Ravi, Vadivukkarasi, Delhi Kumar, Poovilangu Mohan and Anuradha Krishnamurthy in a lead role. Sailatha, who appeared in leading roles in the series Maharasi, Snehethy, Uravukku Kai Koduppom will portray an important role. Sathish, Udhay, Mahalakshmi, Rani and Sri Vithiya was selected to the Important roles.
