= Manthri Kochamma =

- Directed by: Rajan Sithara
- Written by: A. R. Mukesh
- Screenplay by: A. R. Mukesh
- Produced by: Azeez Parappanangadi
- Starring: Prem Kumar; Indrans; Kalpana; Mala Aravindan; Kanaka
- Cinematography: Utpal V. Nayanar
- Edited by: K. Rajagopal
- Music by: Mohan Sithara
- Production company: Family Films
- Distributed by: Family Films
- Release date: 1998
- Country: India
- Language: Malayalam

Manthri Kochamma is a 1998 Indian Malayalam film, directed by Rajan Sithara. Produced by Azeez Parappanangadi The film stars Prem Kumar, Indrans, Kalpana, Mala Aravindan and Kanaka in the lead roles. The film has musical score by Mohan Sithara.

== Cast ==
- Prem Kumar as Jayan
- Kanaka as Maya
- Jagathy Sreekumar
- Indrans
- Kalpana
- Mala Aravindan
- Salim Kumar
- Vijayaraghavan as Krishna Prasad / Tony
- Baiju Ezhupunna as Maheswari Warrier's Brother in law
- Kumarakam Raghunath as Maheswari Warrier's Brother in law
- Chithra as Dr. Maheswari Warrier
- Lakshmi Marikar as Neethu / Meenu (Twins)

== Soundtrack ==
The music was composed by Mohan Sithara.

No.	Song	Singers	Lyrics	Length (m:ss)
1	"Anthimukil"	K. J. Yesudas	S. Ramesan Nair	
2	"Devalokamaano"	Daleema, Manoj Krishnan	S. Ramesan Nair	
3	"Hridayamuraliyude Raagam"	K. S. Chithra	S. Ramesan Nair	
4	"Koodevide Koodevide Oh Mridule"	K. J. Yesudas	S. Ramesan Nair	
5	"Koodevide Koodevide Oh Mridule" [F]	Daleema	S. Ramesan Nair	
6	"Onnaamthumbi"	K. J. Yesudas	S. Ramesan Nair	
7	"Onnaamthumbi"	K. J. Yesudas, Daleema	S. Ramesan Nair	
8	"Poo Virinja Pole"	M. G. Sreekumar	S. Ramesan Nair	
9	"Raanthal Velichathil"	M. G. Sreekumar	S. Ramesan Nair	
