= Ini Oru Sudhanthiram =

- Poster
- Directed by: Manivannan
- Written by: Manivannan
- Produced by: Thirupur N. Venkatachalam
- Starring: Sivakumar
- Cinematography: A. Sabapathy
- Edited by: Gowthaman
- Music by: Gangai Amaran
- Production company: Kalaikovil
- Release date: 12 June 1987
- Country: India
- Language: Tamil

Ini Oru Sudhanthiram (transl. Freedom Now) is a 1987 Indian Tamil-language political drama film written and directed by Manivannan. The film, starring Sivakumar, was released on 12 June 1987, and failed at the box office.

== Plot ==
Sundaramoorthy is an Indian liberal leader. He tries to obtain his pension money, but all his attempts are futile. His daughter Kannamma gets cheated by a collector and she gives birth to a baby but the collector avoids that baby. The collector is killed by Sundaramoorthy, who is sentenced to death. How the lives of such a leader and his family changes due to circumstances, forms the crux of the story.

== Cast ==
- Sivakumar as Sundaramoorthy
- Chandrasekhar as Muthukaalai
- Pandiyan as Pandiyan
- Raja as Raja, the collector
- Janagaraj
- Senthil
- Nalini as Marudagam
- Rekha as Kannamma
- Jeevitha as Thayamma
- Kovai Sarala
- Gandhimathi
- Sulakshana
- Vinu Chakravarthy
- Chitra Lakshmanan
- Thyagu
- Periya Karuppu Thevar
- Sathyaraj as an IPS officer (Guest appearance)

== Production ==
Ini Oru Sudhanthiram, directed by Manivannan, was Sivakumar's 154th film as an actor. Raja played a character with negative shades, in contrast to the softer roles he was known for at the time. The film was launched at office premises of Kalaikovil. It was also launched at Prasad Studios with minister Arumainayagam's wife Tamilselvi lighting the lamp. The filming was held at Coonoor and Ooty.

== Soundtrack ==
The soundtrack was composed by Gangai Amaran, who also wrote the lyrics. His sons Venkat Prabhu and Premgi Amaren contributed as singers, using the names "Prabhu Gangai Amaran" and "Prem Gangai Amaran", respectively.

Track listing
| No. | Title | Lyrics | Singer(s) | Length |
|---|---|---|---|---|
| 1. | "Pallikoodam" | Gangai Amaran | Prabhu Gangai Amaran, Prem Gangai Amaran |
| 2. | "Enru Thaniyum" | Bharathiyar | K. J. Yesudas |
| 3. | "Solla Vallayo" | Bharathiyar | S. P. Sailaja, K. S. Chithra |
| 4. | "Kaigalile Valuvirukku" | Jeeva Bharathi | Malaysia Vasudevan, K. S. Chithra |
| 5. | "Mogathai Konruvidu" | Bharathiyar | K. J. Yesudas, K. S. Chithra |
| 6. | "Partha Pasikuthadi" | Gangai Amaran | P. Jayachandran, S. Janaki |
| 7. | "Sonthangale" | Gangai Amaran | M. S. Viswanathan |
| 8. | "Pattini" | Nagai Swaminathan | Malaysia Vasudevan |

== Critical reception ==
Jayamanmadhan (a duo) of Kalki praised Sivakumar's acting, Chandrasekhar-Nalini's subplot, Vinu Chakravarthy's acting and characterisation. They appreciated Manivannan for skillfully having woven so many characters into separate threads and performed the puppet show without any problems while also praising his hard hitting dialogues but questioned him for making Sathyamurthy's character remain silent to the problems but raging only after he faces a problem.
