= Arthangal Aayiram =

- Theatrical release poster
- Directed by: S. A. Rajkannu
- Screenplay by: S. A. Rajkannu
- Dialogue by: Netaji
- Story by: Netaji
- Produced by: S. A. Rajkannu
- Starring: Parthiban; Bhuvaneswari
- Cinematography: M. M. Rangaswamy
- Edited by: Thirunavukkarasu
- Music by: Shankar–Ganesh
- Production company: Sri Amman Creations
- Release date: 1 November 1981
- Country: India
- Language: Tamil

Arthangal Aayiram (transl. A thousand meanings) is a 1981 Indian Tamil-language film produced and directed by S. A. Rajkannu who also wrote the screenplay while Netaji wrote the story and dialogues. It is Rajkannu's directorial debut. The film stars Parthiban and Bhuvaneswari. It was released on 1 November 1981, and was not a box office success.

== Cast ==
The cast is listed below:

- Parthiban
- Bhuvaneswari
- Krishnamoorthy
- Nagendran
- Ramanamoorthy
- S. S. Chandran
- Jaya Vijaya
- Sri Shanthi

== Soundtrack ==
The music was composed by Shankar–Ganesh. The song "Aasaigalo Oru Kodi" is set to Darbari Kanada, a Carnatic raga.

Track listing
| No. | Title | Lyrics | Singer(s) | Length |
|---|---|---|---|---|
| 1. | "Thoothukudi Sandhaiyile" | Muthu Barathi | Malaysia Vasudevan |
| 2. | "Aasaigalo Oru Kodi" | Muthulingam | S. Janaki |
| 3. | "Kadalodu" | Muthulingam | S. P. Balasubrahmanyam |
| 4. | "Aadivantha Megam" | Pulamaipithan | S. Janaki |

== Release and reception ==
Arthangal Aayiram was released on 1 November 1981. Sindhu and Jeeva of Kalki gave the film a negative review, commenting on its three-hour runtime and said it tests one's patience.
