= Pandiyan (actor) =

Indian actor and politician

- Pandiyan in Panthaya Kuthiraigal (1990)
- Born: 12 July 1960; Chettikurichi, composite Ramanathapuram district, Madras State, (now in Virudhunagar district, Tamil Nadu), India
- Died: 10 January 2008 (aged 48); Madurai, Tamil Nadu, India
- Occupations: Actor, politician
- Years active: 1983-2008
- Spouse: Latha
- Children: 1

Pandiyan (5 January 1960 – 10 January 2008) was an Indian actor and politician who acted in lead roles in the 1980s and supporting roles from the 1990s.

Pandiyan acted in over 75 films in his career. Some of his popular films include Mann Vasanai (1983), Pudhumai Penn (1984), Aan Paavam (1985), Mannukketha Ponnu (1985), Marudhani (1985), Muthal Vasantham (1986), Thirumathi Oru Vegumathi (1987), Aankalai Nambathey (1987) and Sathan Sollai Thattathe (1990).

== Personal life ==
Pandiyan was born as Pandikannan to parents Solairaj and Saraswathi in Chettikurichi, a town in the erstwhile Virudhunagar district of Tamil Nadu in a Gavara Chettiar family. He married Latha and has one children Solai Ragavendran alias Raghu (born 1990). He was selling bangles in his family owned jewellery shop in Madurai, India when he was spotted by director Bharathiraja who offered him the lead role in the film Mann Vasanai (1983) which became a box-office hit. He joined the All India Anna Dravida Munnetra Kazhagam (AIADMK) in 2001.

== Death ==
Pandiyan died at age of 48 due to liver failure and viral hepatitis on 10 January 2008.

== Filmography ==
| Year | Film | Role | Notes |
|---|---|---|---|
| 1983 | Mann Vasanai | Veeranna | Debut film |
| 1983 | Manaivi Solle Manthiram | Bharathan | |
| 1984 | Kuva Kuva Vaathugal | Pandiyan | |
| 1984 | Naan Paadum Paadal | Selvam | |
| 1984 | Vengayin Maindhan | Vengay | |
| 1984 | Vaazhkai | Kannan | |
| 1984 | Pudhumai Penn | Ramachandran | |
| 1984 | Sirai | Muthu | |
| 1984 | Mann Soru | | |
| 1984 | Sukradesai | Kannan | |
| 1984 | Enn Uyir Nanbaa | Anand | |
| 1984 | Neram Nalla Neram | Veriya | |
| 1984 | Thalaiyanai Manthiram | Raja | |
| 1984 | Ponnu Pudichirukku | | |
| 1984 | Nichayam | | |
| 1985 | Mannukketha Ponnu | Marudhan | |
| 1985 | Navagraha Nayagi | Mahendra Boopathi (Mayandi) | |
| 1985 | Marudhani | Manikkam | |
| 1985 | Pattuchelai | Azhagu | |
| 1985 | Raja Gopuram | Ranga | |
| 1985 | Aan Paavam | Periya Paandi | |
| 1986 | Karimedu Karuvayan | Comboter | |
| 1986 | Kadaikan Paarvai | Babu | |
| 1986 | Jothi Malar | Pandiyan | |
| 1986 | Muthal Vasantham | Ponnusamy | |
| 1986 | Thaaiku Oru Thaalaattu | Ramesh | |
| 1986 | Kovil Yaanai | Raja | |
| 1986 | Mannukkul Vairam | Bhoomi | |
| 1987 | Thirumathi Oru Vegumathi | Krishnan | |
| 1987 | Thaye Neeye Thunai | Pandiyan | |
| 1987 | Ore Raththam | Ponnan | |
| 1987 | Cooliekkaran | Prisoner | Guest appearance |
| 1987 | Ini Oru Sudhanthiram | Pandiyan | |
| 1987 | Aankalai Nambathey | Muthupandi | |
| 1987 | Oorkavalan | Pandiyan | |
| 1987 | Parisam Pottachu | Ramu | |
| 1987 | Aayusu Nooru | Subramani | |
| 1987 | Arul Tharum Ayyappan | Sangusaamy | |
| 1988 | Kaalaiyum Neeye Maalaiyum Neeye | Selvaa | Guest appearance |
| 1988 | Veedu Manaivi Makkal | Henchman | |
| 1988 | Guru Sishyan | Manoharan | |
| 1988 | Rayilukku Neramachu | Officer | |
| 1988 | Poonthotta Kaavalkaaran | Muthu Batcha | |
| 1988 | Thanga Kalasam | Arun | |
| 1988 | Melam Kottu Thali Kattu | Machakalai | |
| 1988 | Thenpandi Cheemaiyile | Velu | |
| 1989 | Kadhal Enum Nadhiyinile | Ranganathan | |
| 1989 | Karunguyil Kundram | | |
| 1989 | Solaikuyil | Kaali | |
| 1989 | Sakalakala Sammanthi | Vasanthan | |
| 1989 | Sangu Pushpangal | Doctor | |
| 1989 | Valathu Kalai Vaithu Vaa | Ramesh | |
| 1990 | Pengal Veettin Kangal | Jeeva | |
| 1990 | Panthaya Kuthiraigal | | |
| 1990 | Sathan Sollai Thattathe | Murthy | |
| 1991 | Kumbakarai Thangaiah | Kanhaiya | |
| 1991 | Pudhu Nellu Pudhu Naathu | —N/a | Dubbing artist for Rahul |
| 1991 | MGR Nagaril | Siva | |
| 1991 | Anbulla Thangachikku | Chinna Durai | |
| 1991 | Thayamma | Pandiyan | |
| 1992 | Nadodi Thendral | Poonguruvi's cousin | |
| 1993 | Kizhakku Cheemayile | Chinna Karuppu | |
| 1993 | Paarambariyam | Sekar | |
| 1993 | Pettredutha Pillai | Kumaran's father | |
| 1994 | Maindhan | Inspector Vijay | |
| 1994 | Periya Marudhu | Pandiyan | |
| 1994 | Atha Maga Rathiname | Minor Rajapandi | |
| 1994 | Vaa Magale Vaa | Kalyani's husband | Guest appearance |
| 1995 | Padikira Vayasula | | |
| 1996 | Thirumbi Paar | Ashok | |
| 1996 | Purushan Pondatti | Natarajan | |
| 1996 | Gopala Gopala | Contestant on the reality show | Guest appearance |
| 1997 | Periya Idathu Mappillai | Pandiyan | |
| 1998 | Udhavikku Varalaamaa | Paalrasu | |
| 1998 | Unnudan | Ticket inspector | Guest appearance |
| 2001 | Citizen | Vaappa | |
| 2003 | Anbe Un Vasam | Investigator | Guest appearance |
| 2006 | Kaivantha Kalai | Kausalya's father | |
| 2008 | Pudhusu Kanna Pudhusu | Rocky | |

=== Television ===
| Year | Series | Role | Notes |
|---|---|---|---|
| 1999 | Plastic Vizhuthugal | | |
| 2001-2002 | Kelunga Mamiyare Neengalum Marumagal Than | R.K | |
