= Kumbakarai Thangaiah =

- Poster
- Directed by: Gangai Amaran
- Written by: Rajvarman (dialogues)
- Screenplay by: Gangai Amaran
- Story by: Sangili Murugan
- Produced by: Ramumachan
- Starring: Prabhu; Kanaka; Pandiyan; M. N. Nambiar
- Cinematography: A. Sabapathy
- Edited by: B. Lenin; V. T. Vijayan
- Music by: Ilaiyaraaja
- Production company: Murugan Cini Arts
- Release date: 14 January 1991
- Country: India
- Language: Tamil

Kumbakarai Thangaiah is a 1991 Indian Tamil-language film, directed by Gangai Amaran and produced by Ramumachan. The film stars Prabhu, Kanaka, Pandiyan and M. N. Nambiar. It was released on 14 January 1991, during Pongal.

== Plot ==
Mangamma, who is in love with Thangaiya, is distraught while he faces a tough predicament owing to a disagreement in their village.

== Cast ==
- Prabhu
- Kanaka
- Pandiyan
- M. N. Nambiar
- Senthamarai
- Raja Bagadhur
- Babloo Prithiveeraj
- S. S. Chandran
- Senthil
- Kovai Sarala
- Gandhimathi
- S. N. Lakshmi
- S. N. Parvathy
- V. Gopalakrishnan
- A. K. Veerasamy
- Peeli Sivam
- Rajaji
- Periya Karuppu Thevar
- Kullamani

== Soundtrack ==
The music was composed by Ilaiyaraaja. The lyrics for all songs were written by Gangai Amaran except "Ennai Oruvan", written by Ilaiyaraaja himself. The song "Poothu Pothu" is set to the raga Suddhadhanyasi.

Track listing
No.	Title	Singer(s)	Length
1.	"Pattu Onna"	S. Janaki, S. P. Balasubrahmanyam	4:46
2.	"Poothu Pothu"	S. P. Balasubrahmanyam, Uma Ramanan	4:56
3.	"Thendral Kaatre"	S. Janaki, Mano	4:07
4.	"Ennai Oruvan"	Ilaiyaraaja	3:45
5.	"Kumbamkarai Sertha"	S. Janaki, S. P. Balasubrahmanyam	4:54
6.	"Koodalooru Gundumalli"	Malaysia Vasudevan, K. S. Chithra	4:57
7.	"Kootathula Kuninchu"	Malaysia Vasudevan, K. S. Chithra, T. S. Raghavendra	5:12
8.	"Thendral Kaatre" (solo)	S. Janaki	3:54
Total length:			36:31

== Reception ==
Sundarji of Kalki gave the film a negative review, but said the music was a redeeming feature.
