= Sahadevan Mahadevan =

- Lobby card
- Directed by: Rama Narayanan
- Written by: T. S. Krishnakumar (dialogues)
- Screenplay by: Rama Narayanan
- Story by: T. S. Krishnakumar
- Produced by: N. Radha
- Starring: Mohan; S. V. Shekhar
- Cinematography: N. K. Viswanathan
- Edited by: Rajakeerthy
- Music by: Shankar–Ganesh
- Production company: Sri Thenandal Films
- Release date: 2 December 1988
- Running time: 110 minutes
- Country: India
- Language: Tamil

Sahadevan Mahadevan is a 1988 Indian Tamil-language comedy film directed by Rama Narayanan, starring Mohan and S. V. Shekhar, with S. S. Chandran, Kovai Sarala, Pallavi, and Madhuri in supporting roles. The film was released on 2 December 1988 and was a success.

== Plot ==
The story is about two unemployed youths, Sahadevan and Mahadevan, who become detectives to solve Kaveri's problem. Kaveri is Sahadevan's love interest. Adiyapatham is a politician who is going to open a party for children. Adiyapatham is too affectionate with his wife Chinnamani. Mahadevan is an unemployed youth in a village and he ran away from his three daughters of his uncle after he came to Madras (Chennai).

He went to Sahadevan's rental house and got into a problem with the house owner. She took his and Mahadevan's degree certificates for not paying the rent, so both men went to Adiyapatham's place for asking about his car shed rent. He misunderstand that Mahadevan came for a marriage proposal to his daughter Geetha. Geetha falls in love with Mahadevan, but he runs away when he saw her. Sahadevan falls in love with Kaveri, but she has a problem with her maternal uncle Veerappa, who wants to marry her.

So he kidnaps Chinnamani instead of Kaveri, and Chinnamani gives the phone number of the place to Adiyapatham. Both Sahadevan and Mahadevan find the place through the telephone exchange. They go and fight with Veerappa and his people and save Kaveri from them with a final police sequence. The film ends with the men getting married.

== Cast ==
- Mohan as Sahadevan
- S. V. Shekhar as Mahadevan
- S. S. Chandran as Politician Adiyapatham
- Kovai Sarala as Chinnamani
- Pallavi as Geetha
- Madhuri as Kaveri
- S. N. Parvathy as Mandodari, Sahadevan's house owner
- Kumarimuthu as Laundry Man
- Thyagu as Miloma Smuggler
- Chozharajan as Veerappa, Kavari's maternal uncle
- Pakoda Kathar as Kumarimuthu's laundry assistant

== Soundtrack ==
The music was composed by Shankar–Ganesh and K. Bhagyaraj (This was mentioned in song visuals) lyrics were penned by Vaali.

Track listing
No.	Title	Singer(s)	Length
1.	"Aayiram Poigal Pesum"	Sakthisanmugam
2.	"Devaloga Indhiran Theendidaatha Chandhiran"	Mano and chorus
3.	"Oru Jigu Jigu Rail (music by K. Bhagyaraj)"	S. P. Balasubrahmanyam and Vani Jairam
4.	"Raja Raja Chozhan Thaan"	Mano and S. N. Surender
5.	"Sirikkanum Thaikkulanga Sirikkanum""	Seerkazhi Sivachidambaram
