= Allullostunnaru =

- Directed by: K. Vasu
- Written by: Satyanand
- Produced by: Kilaru Baburao
- Starring: Chandra Mohan; Chiranjeevi; Sulakshana; Geetha
- Cinematography: P. Babu Rao
- Music by: K. V. Mahadevan
- Release date: 11 February 1984
- Country: India
- Language: Telugu

Allullostunnaru (English: Sons-in-law are coming) is a 1984 Telugu film directed by K. Vasu. The film stars Chandra Mohan, Chiranjeevi, Sulakshana and Geetha in important roles. The core story finds similarities with the plotline of Hindi movie Andaz Apna Apna which was again later made in Telugu as Veedevadandi Babu. Similar storyline was later found in other Hindi movies such as Joru Ka Ghulam and Jodi No. 1. The music was composed by K. V. Mahadevan.

== Plot ==
Chandram (Chandra Mohan) and Gopi (Chiranjeevi) are close friends. Chandram is a poor orphan. Gopi is the son of a rich man Basava Raju (Padmanabham). They have no aim in life and they spend life in parks and pubs. Basava Raju sends Gopi to the house of his friend Mangapati (Prabhakar Reddy) in Madras (now Chennai). Gopi and Chandram go to Madras. Gopi sends Chandram as Gopi to Mangapati's house. Mangapati is a rich affluent person and has a daughter Radha (Sulakshana). Chandram and Radha fall in love. Gopi meets Sita (Geetha). Her brother Simhachalam (Chalam) is a drunkard. Gopi clears Sita's loans and they fall in love. Later the two pairs are united.

== Cast ==
- Chandra Mohan as Chandram
- Chiranjeevi as Gopal Krishna "Gopi"
- Sulakshana as Radha
- Geetha as Sita
- Chalam as Simhachalam
- Prabhakar Reddy as Mangapati
- Padmanabham as Basava Raju
- Giri Babu as Giri
- Silk Smitha as item number

== Soundtrack ==
No.	Title	Singer(s)	Length
1.	"Nee Choopu Choopu Kadu"
2.	"Muchchata Teerchara"	S. P. Sailaja
3.	"Cheeraku Chengandam"	S. P. Balasubrahmanyam, P. Susheela
4.	"Muddaina Poddaina"	S. P. Balu, P. Susheela, S. P. Sailaja, V. Ramakrishna
