= Thaali Kattiya Raasa =

- Poster
- Directed by: Vijaya Kanna
- Screenplay by: Vijaya Kanna
- Story by: J. F. Raja
- Produced by: M. Natarasan; Thanjai D. Pragadeshwaran; K. Selvam; J. F. Raja
- Starring: Murali; Kanaka
- Cinematography: A. A. Mazeed
- Edited by: Chezhian
- Music by: S. A. Rajkumar
- Production company: Poomagal Pictures Circuit
- Release date: 25 September 1992
- Running time: 134 minutes
- Country: India
- Language: Tamil

Thaali Kattiya Raasa is a 1992 Indian Tamil-language film directed by Vijaya Kanna and produced by M. Natarasan, Thanjai D. Pragadeshwaran, K. Selvam, and J. F. Raja. The film stars Murali, Kanaka, Senthamarai, and Anandaraj. It was released on 25 September 1992.

== Plot ==
Mythili falls in love with Pandiyan, an educated man from her village. However, they must first confront Mythili's cruel father, who had previously ruined her sister's life.

== Cast ==
- Murali as Pandiyan
- Kanaka as Mythili
- Goundamani as tea stall owner
- Senthil as tea stall employee
- Senthamarai
- Anandaraj
- K. R. Savithri
- Kuyili
- Kullamani
- Singamuthu
- Dhatchayini
- Sharmili
- Sittal Mallika
- Vijayammal
- Madurai Soraja
- Mary
- Radha Krishnan
- Dhanapal
- S. A. Rajkumar (special appearance)

== Soundtrack ==
The music was composed by S. A. Rajkumar.

Song	Singers	Lyrics	Length
"Ada Nichayathartham"	K. J. Yesudas	Vaali	03:52
"Ennachu Namma Desam"	Mano	S. A. Rajkumar	04:19
"Kadhava Thiranthu"	S. P. Sailaja	Vaali	04:21
"Therku Malai Kaathu"	K. S. Chithra	Vaali	04:14
"Unnai Oru Kelvi"	K. S. Chithra, K. J. Yesudas	Vaali	04:15
