= Chinthamani (TV series) =

2015 IndianTamil-language soap opera

- கைராசிக்குடும்பம்
- Genre: Soap opera
- Written by: V.Padmavathy, V.Thiruselvam
- Screenplay by: V.Thiruselvam
- Directed by: A.P. Rajendran
- Starring: Shiva; Subathira; Vithiya; Sri Vidhya; Mohana
- Original language: Tamil
- No. of seasons: 1
- No. of episodes: 686

Production
- Producer: Sathya Jyothi Films
- Editor: G. Daniel Rajadurai
- Camera setup: Multi-camera
- Running time: approx. 20-22 minutes per episode
- Production companies: Sun Entertainment; Sathya Jyothi Films

Original release
- Network: Jaya TV
- Release: 22 April 2015 – 24 November 2017

Kairasi Kudumbam (Tamil: கைராசிக்குடும்பம் transl. 'Lucky Family') is a 2015 IndianTamil-language soap opera that aired on Jaya TV. It was broadcast from 22 April 2015 to 24 November 2017 at 8:30 PM (IST) and ended with 686 Episodes. The show stars Shiva, Subathira, and Vithiya. The show is directed by V. Thiruselvam.
