= Pudhumai Penn (1984 film) =

1984 film by Bharathiraja

- Theatrical release poster
- Directed by: Bharathiraja
- Screenplay by: Bharathiraja
- Story by: R. Selvaraj
- Produced by: M. Saravanan; M. Balasubramaniam
- Starring: Pandiyan; Revathi
- Cinematography: B. Kannan
- Edited by: V. Rajagopal
- Music by: Ilaiyaraaja
- Production company: AVM Productions
- Release date: 14 July 1984
- Country: India
- Language: Tamil

Pudhumai Penn (transl. Modern Woman), released as AVMin Pudhumai Penn (transl. AVM's Modern Woman), is a 1984 Indian Tamil-language drama film directed by Bharathiraja and produced by AVM Productions. The film, starring Pandiyan and Revathi, was released on 14 July 1984. Initially a box office failure, it experienced a resurgence and attracted larger audiences after M. G. Ramachandran, then the Chief Minister of Tamil Nadu, re-released it with lower ticket prices.

== Plot ==
Seetha lives a simple life with her father, a Tamil teacher in a village. When Seetha's elder sister dies by suicide after dowry harassment from her husband's family, Seetha's father struggles to find a suitable groom for her because of his poverty. He meets Ram, a bank employee, and introduces him to Seetha; after a few days, they decide to marry.

Ram's mother dislikes Seetha's financial circumstances, and frequently insults her. Seetha tolerates this treatment because of her love for Ram but her father, unable to bear his daughter's suffering, also dies by suicide.

Ram invites his new boss, Rajasekar, to his home for lunch. Rajasekar is attracted to Seetha, who avoids him.

Ram's sister becomes pregnant by Ram's friend, and their families pressure them to marry. Unable to pay for the wedding, Ram steals money from the bank. He is caught by Rajasekar, who says that if Ram allows him to have sex with Seetha he will not inform the police about the theft. Angered by this suggestion, Ram beats Rajasekar up and leaves home.

Rajasekar is found dead the following day, and Ram is arrested by the police on suspicion of murder. Seetha seeks help from David, a criminal lawyer and friend of her father's, but learns that David has moved away. Seetha finds another lawyer for Ram, and begins modeling for a painter to pay for it and financially assist Ram's mother and sister. Ram's mother insults Seetha, however, accusing her of prostitution.

The painter asks Seetha to pose nude, which angers her; she stops modeling for him. She earns money from jobs such as cooking and doing other household chores.

Seetha sees David, follows him home, and asks him to represent Ram in court. David tells Seetha that he killed Rajasekar for raping his sister, and apologises for Ram's false arrest.

David appears in court and confesses to the murder, leading to Ram's release. Seetha learns that she is pregnant and looks forward to telling Ram, but his mother convinces him that he is not the baby's father. When Ram asks Seetha about the child's paternity, she considers suicide but decides to leave home and live on her own.

== Cast ==
- Pandiyan as Ramachandran
- Revathi as Seetha
- Pratap Pothen as David
- Rajasekhar as Rajasekhar
- Y. G. Mahendran
- Janagaraj
- Chitra Lakshmanan
- Ra. Sankaran as Seetha's father

== Production ==
AVM Productions wanted to make a film with Bharathiraja after the success of his Puthiya Vaarpugal (1979). Several years later, they collaborated on the project which became Pudhumai Penn. The film's screenplay was by R. Selvaraj, who said this story was initially intended to be filmed as Bharathiraja's debut: Sontha Veedu (transl. Own House), with R. Muthuraman and J. Jayalalithaa, which was shelved. Pudhumai Penn was the acting debut of Dr. Rajasekhar, and Pandiyan's only collaboration with AVM. Revathi was 17 years old when she made the film. The studio's name was added to the film's title (AVMin Pudhumai Penn), and several scenes were filmed at Ooty.

== Soundtrack ==
The soundtrack was composed by Ilaiyaraaja, with lyrics by Vairamuthu. The song "Kasthuri Maane" is set in the Carnatic raga Mohanam, and "Kadhal Mayakkam" is set in another Carnatic raga Shuddha Saveri.

Track listing
No.	Title	Singer(s)	Length
1.	"Oru Thendral"	Malaysia Vasudevan, Chorus	4:40
2.	"Kasthuri Mane"	K. J. Yesudas, Uma Ramanan	5:09
3.	"Alamara Pondhu"	Ilaiyaraaja	4:18
4.	"Kathal Mayakam"	P. Jayachandran, Sunanda	6:12
Total length:			20:19

== Release ==
Pudhumai Penn was released on 14 July 1984, and ran for 208 days at Madurai's Mini Priya theatre. The film was a box-office failure during its first run. Chief Minister of Tamil Nadu M. G. Ramachandran decided to re-release it with a lower ₹3 ticket price, which attracted a larger audience.

== Critical reception ==
Jayamanmadhan of Kalki praised the film's direction and performances, but criticised its plot inconsistencies and was disappointed at Revathi's character leaving home. Balumani of Anna praised its acting, dialogue, and Bharathiraja and AVM for the film's revolutionary message.

== Bibliography ==
- Saravanan, M. (2013) [2005]. AVM 60 Cinema (in Tamil) (3rd ed.). Rajarajan Pathippagam. OCLC 1158347612.
