= Pozhuthu Vidinchachu =

- Title card
- Directed by: Gangai Amaran
- Written by: Gangai Amaran
- Produced by: V. C. Varadhanandhan
- Starring: Prabhu; Sulakshana
- Cinematography: A. Sabapathy
- Edited by: B. Lenin; V. T. Vijayan
- Music by: Ilaiyaraaja
- Production company: Sooraj Enterprises
- Release date: 24 February 1984
- Country: India
- Language: Tamil

Pozhuthu Vidinchachu (transl. Morning has dawned) is a 1984 Indian Tamil-language film written and directed by Gangai Amaran. The film stars Prabhu and Sulakshana, with Anjali Devi, M. N. Nambiar and Shanmugasundaram in supporting roles. It was released on 24 February 1984.

== Cast ==
- Prabhu
- Sulakshana
- M. N. Nambiar
- Anjali Devi as Prabhu's grandmother
- Shanmugasundaram
- G. Srinivasan
- Vinu Chakravarthy
- Usilai Mani
- Vellai Subbaiah
- M. L. A. Thangaraj
- Master Suraj
- Jayamala

== Production ==
P. S. Nivas was originally reported to be the film's cinematographer. The film was launched in late March 1983 at AVM Studios with M. Saravanan lighting the lamp. The song "Athai Thavamirundhu" was recorded the same day.

== Soundtrack ==
The music was composed by Ilaiyaraaja.

Track listing
No.	Title	Lyrics	Singer(s)	Length
1.	"Aatha Manasu"	Vairamuthu	Malaysia Vasudevan, S. P. Sailaja
2.	"Ettu Thesaiyum"	Gangai Amaran	S. P. Balasubrahmanyam, Malaysia Vasudevan
3.	"Kaatre"	Gangai Amaran	Malaysia Vasudevan, Vani Jairam
4.	"Athai Tavamirunthu"	Vaali	S. P. Sailaja
5.	"Athai Tavamirunthu"	Vaali	Malaysia Vasudevan
6.	"Oorai Yechu"	Gangai Amaran	S. P. Balasubrahmanyam, Malaysia Vasudevan

== Release and reception ==
Pozhuthu Vidinchachu was released on 24 February 1984. Jayamanmadhan of Kalki praised the acting of Nambiar and Shanmugasundaram and noted Gangai Amaran should not have credited himself for story and screenplay for this same old plot and Ilaiyaraaja did not compose anything which stays in mind and concluded saying there is still the morning darkness and it is not quite dawn yet.
