= Kadhal Enum Nadhiyinile =

1989 film by M. K. I. Sukumaran

- Theatrical release poster
- Directed by: M. K. I. Sukumaran
- Produced by: P. Vargees Mathews
- Starring: Shankar; Seetha; Pandiyan
- Cinematography: Ramachandra Babu
- Edited by: L. Kesavan
- Music by: Manoj–Gyan
- Production company: J.A. Movie Combines
- Release date: 27 January 1989
- Country: India
- Language: Tamil

Kadhal Enum Nadhiyinile (transl. In the river of love) is a 1989 Tamil-language Indian romance film directed by M. K. I. Sukumaran, starring Shankar along with Seetha and Pandiyan. It was released on 27 January 1989.

== Plot ==
A rich girl, Ganga, falls in love with the leading student of the college, Ranganathan. Ranganathan's elder sister is unmarried and she is the breadwinner, with widowed mother and a school-going sister, forcing him to conceal his love affair from his elders and promising Ganga, who is aware of the growing friction in their family, of a better turn of events. Ganga is attracted toward that family, for parents (Vijayan) and (CID Shakuntala) are "society birds" paying little attention to their daughter, who longs for their love and care.

The rich college bully Prem Kumar is the only son of widower Balasubrahmaniam. Prem Kumar and student chairman Ranganathan often clash with each other, both seeking the hand of Ganga. Prem really loves Ganga despite her hatred for him following his unethical approaches and humiliations; he engineers to ridicule the Ranga-Ganga love, which queers the pitch in the former's home.

Ranga and Ganga learn through Prem's father of the affliction that is taking Prem to the doorsteps of death and request them to be kind with him, which brings Ganga closer to Prem, making her see the other side of the ruffian who has been doting on her a series of his paintings of her bearing testimony to that. Ganga is swayed by these developments and is unable to decide which one loves her more, the sympathy aspect also playing a part.

Climax reveals Ganga's selection of partner, Prem or Ranga?

== Cast ==
- Shankar
- Seetha
- Pandiyan
- Vijayan
- Senthamarai
- Balan K. Nair
- Loose Mohan
- C. I. D. Sakunthala
- Raghu Balayya
- J. Lalitha
- Mohanapriya
- P. Vargees Mathews

== Soundtrack ==
Soundtrack was composed by Manoj–Gyan.

Track listing
No.	Title	Singer(s)	Length
1.	"Kanna Vazhga"	K. S. Chithra
2.	"Friends"	Malaysia Vasudevan
3.	"Ullam Ullam"	P. Jayachandran, K. S. Chithra
4.	"Kanbathu Kanava"	S. P. Balasubrahmanyam, K. S. Chithra
5.	"Kathal Enum"	S. P. Balasubrahmanyam

== Reception ==
The magazine Pon Manam mentioned that the film is a different triangular love story and appreciated the directorial skill of M. K. I. Sukumaran, while the weekly Suspense mentioned it as a new presentation in triangular love stories and will succeed at the box office without any doubt. Maalai Malar acknowledged the director saying, M. K. I. Sukumaran deserves a place along with Bharathiraja, K. Balachander and Mani Ratnam, while Kumudam weekly praised actor Shankar, but criticised the climax of the film. Marumanam praised the acting skills of the lead actors along with Balan K. Nair summering it as a very different film. Top Star magazine praised the film mentioning that "youth will enjoy the film". Sihappu Naada weekly praised the director and mentioned "Kadhal Enum Nadhiyinile is a must watch for lovers, failed lovers, successful lovers and couples who loves after marriage". The Hindu wrote that the film will make the younger elements to think twice before getting involved in serious love affairs that may have far reaching consequences is told with conviction and a certain amount of farsightedness. Dinamani said that the film will be much loved by college students. Ananda Vikatan wrote that, even though the film is a love triangle, the director has presented it in a unique way without the usual cliches of caste and status in society and gave 42/100 marks. Thaai weekly praised the film for its unusual presentation of a love triangle and mentioned actor Shankar's successful re-entry after Oru Thalai Ragam. Mounam Ravi of Dina Sari appreciated the director M. K. I. Sukumaran for presenting a strong love story, saying that he is the true successor to his guru Mahendran Ramji from Makkal Kural wrote that the film is a treat for Lovers and will haunt the minds for the tragic end. Dina Dhooth recommended this film for college students and appreciated the director. Moon magazine mentioned that the film is a treat for youngsters. N. Krishnaswamy of The Indian Express wrote, "I suspect director M. K. I. Sukumaran messed up the script because he wanted Sankar's role to be different from the one he played in Oru Thalai Raagam."
