= Samundi =

- Theatrical release poster
- Directed by: Manoj Kumar
- Written by: Manoj Kumar; Sivaram Gandhi (dialogues)
- Produced by: Mohan Natarajan; V. Shanmugam
- Starring: R. Sarathkumar; Kanaka
- Cinematography: Utpal V Nayanar
- Edited by: Napoleon
- Music by: Deva
- Production company: Sri Raja Kaliamman Enterprises
- Release date: 18 September 1992
- Running time: 140 minutes
- Country: India
- Language: Tamil

Samundi is a 1992 Indian Tamil-language action drama film directed by Manoj Kumar. The film stars R. Sarathkumar and Kanaka. It was released on 18 September 1992.

== Plot ==
Samundi, his mother and his little sister Lakshmi move into their new house in a little village. Ponnuthayi, a washerwoman, sympathises with Samundi's family and she eventually falls in love with Samundi. Rajangam and his brother spread terror among the villagers. One day, the ringing of temple bells and the heralding of the festival throws Samundi into an uncontrollable fit of rage. Ponnuthayi asks the reason for his rage and Samundi tells her about his tragic past.

In the past, Samundi prepared his sister Rasathi's wedding and he took her to the temple. There, he clashed with some thugs. In the confrontation, Rasathi was pushed into the lake and drowned. The wedding was cancelled and Samundi's family left his village.

Samundi cannot tolerate any more the oppression of Rajangam's henchmen so he beats them. The villagers then acclaim Samundi, and Rajangam feels ridiculed. At Samundi's wedding, a police officer, who is under Rajangam's order, arrests the innocent Samundi. Samundi is then released after the villagers' pressure. The angry Samundi enters in Rajangam's house with a machete and kills Rajangam and to his surprise, he finds his sister Rasathi alive and wearing a white saree (widow's clothes). What transpires later forms the crux of the story.

== Cast ==
- R. Sarathkumar as Samundi
- Kanaka as Ponnuthayi
- Meera as Rasathi
- Sangita as Lakshmi
- Goundamani
- Mansoor Ali Khan as Rajangam
- Uday Prakash
- Varalakshmi as Samundi's mother
- Ponnambalam
- Samikannu as Ponnuthayi's father
- Thideer Kannaiah
- Sethu Vinayagam
- Joker Thulasi
- Singamuthu
- King Kong

== Production ==
The film's shooting was held in Gobichettipalayam, a small town near Coimbatore, which became famous after the tremendous success of Chinna Thambi.

== Soundtrack ==
The music was composed by Deva, with lyrics written by Vaali.

Song	Singer(s)	Duration
"Ethungadi"	K. S. Chithra	4:46
"Kannula Paalai"	S. P. Balasubrahmanyam, K. S. Chithra	5:09
"Kummanum"	S. Janaki	4:50
"Mannai Thottu"	S. P. Balasubrahmanyam	4:13
"Muthu Nagai"	S. P. Balasubrahmanyam, S. Janaki	5:24
"Kathava Sathu"	S. P. Balasubrahmanyam, S. Janaki	4:43

== Reception ==
Malini Mannath of The Indian Express said, "The film offers nothing new in terms of entertainment nor can it keep viewers glued to their seats for long". The film completed a 100-day run at the box-office.
