= Aval Appadithan (TV series) =

Indian Tamil-language soap opera

- அவள் அப்படித்தான்
- Genre: Soap opera
- Written by: R.Elavarasan
- Screenplay by: Devi Bala
- Directed by: R.Elavarasan
- Starring: Easwari Rao; Shilpa; O.R. Sundhar; Naresh Eswar; Deepa; T. S. B. K. Mouli; Subbiah; Kamalesh; B.R. Elavarasan
- Theme music composer: kiran
- Country of origin: India
- Original language: Tamil
- No. of seasons: 1
- No. of episodes: 318

Production
- Producer: R. Sathish Kumar
- Editor: S.Arul
- Camera setup: Multi-camera
- Running time: approx. 20-22 minutes per episode
- Production company: Citram screens

Original release
- Network: Jaya TV
- Release: 29 January 2013 – 14 February 2014

Aval Appadithan (Tamil: அவள் அப்படித்தான்) (transl. "She was like that") is an Indian Tamil-language soap opera that aired Monday through Friday on Jaya TV from 29 January 2013 to 6 December 2013 at 9:30PM IST and 9 December 2013 to 14 February 2014 8:30PM IST for 318 episodes.

The show starred Easwari Rao, Shilpa, Sreepadma and O.R. Sundhar among others. It was director by R.Elavarasan.

== Airing history ==
The show started airing on Jaya TV on 29 January 2013 and It aired on Monday through Friday 9:30PM IST. Later its timing changed Starting from Monday 9 December 2013, the show was shifted to 8:30PM IST time Slot. A new show named Chithiram Pesuthadi replaced this show at 8:30PM IST

Aired	Time	Episode
29 January 2013 - 6 December 2013	Monday - Friday; 9:30PM IST	1–278
9 December 2013 - 14 February 2014	Monday - Friday; 8:30PM IST	278–318
