= Arusuvai Ithu Thani Suvai =

- Genre: Cooking
- Presented by: Revathy Shanmugam (daughter of Kannadasan)
- Country of origin: India
- Original language: Tamil

Production
- Running time: 30 minutes

Original release
- Network: Jaya TV
- Release: April 28, 2014 – April 23, 2018

Arusuvai Ithu Thani Suvai is a Tamil-language Indian television series featuring Revathy Shanmugam cooking simplified recipes that everyday-cooks and viewers can try. Revathy Shanmugam, daughter of renowned Tamil poet and lyricist Kannadasan, specialises in cooking traditional authentic South Indian cuisine.

The show airs on Jaya TV every Monday at 6pm.

The show was also previously co-hosted by both Revathy Shanmugam and chef Virgil James.
