= Mann Vasanai =

1983 film by Bharathiraja

- Poster
- Directed by: Bharathiraja
- Written by: Panchu Arunachalam (dialogues)
- Screenplay by: Bharathiraja
- Story by: P. Kalaimani
- Produced by: Chitra Ramu; Chitra Lakshmanan
- Starring: Pandiyan; Revathi
- Cinematography: B. Kannan
- Edited by: V. Rajagopal
- Music by: Ilaiyaraaja
- Production company: Gayathri Films
- Release date: 16 September 1983
- Country: India
- Language: Tamil

Mann Vasanai (transl. The Fragrance of Soil) is a 1983 Indian Tamil-language romantic drama film directed by Bharathiraja. The film stars Pandiyan and Revathi, with Vinu Chakravarthy, Gandhimathi, and Y. Vijaya in supporting roles. It was released on 16 September 1983 and ran for over 200 days in theatres, besides winning the Filmfare Award for Best Film – Tamil. This is both Pandian and Revathi's debut in Tamil cinema. The film was remade in Telugu as Mangammagari Manavadu (1984).

== Plot ==
Ochayi, a widow, lives in Karisalpatti village with her son Veerannan, a school dropout. Ochayi's daughter is married to Mookkaiya Thevar, whose daughter is Muthupechi. Malaichamy Thevar, the chief of the neighbouring village, is the patron of the village school, where children from both villages study. Mookkaiya Thevar has an extramarital affair with Hamsavalli and spends most of his time and money on her. Though Muthupechi secretly nurtures a desire to marry her maternal uncle Veerannan, he does not think along those lines as their families are not on talking terms due to a dispute over a field that was to be gifted as dowry to Mookkaiya at the time of his wedding. Though Mookkaiya has a grownup daughter, he pressures his wife to get the dowry owed to him from Ochayi. However, Ochayi does not yield to the pressure as she feels that Mookkaiya, the womaniser, would squander it on his other women.

A new teacher joins the village and falls in love with Muthupechi. When Muthupechi attains puberty, Mookkaiya organises a ceremony but does not invite Ochayi and Veerannan, her suitor, to perform rituals as per tradition. Enraged, Veerannan creates a ruckus. The villagers support him and advise Mookkaiya to invite Ochayi and Veerannan. Mookkaiya relents. All rituals take place and Muthupechi feels happy for having drawn the attention of Veerannan. Veerannan, who had all the while ignored Muthupechi, now gets attracted to her and they start meeting each other secretly. Veerannan promises to marry Muthupechi. Hamsavalli's brother Muthukalai asks Mookkaiya why he was not invited to perform the rituals of a suitor at Muthupechi's function. Though Mookkaiya is having an illicit relationship with Hamsavalli, he looks down upon them and is irritated with Muthukalai's desire.

During a jallikattu festival in the village, Veerannan fights with a bull belonging to Malaichamy and wins a gold chain as a prize. Upset with his bull being subdued by Veerannan, Malaichamy schemes to teach a lesson to Mookkaiya who constantly boasts about his bull. He manipulates Mookkaiya into announcing that the person who controls his bull will win Muthupechi as the prize. Muthukalai feeds Mookkaiya's bull medicinal herbs, resulting in Malaichami's man subduing the bull. Malaichamy demands that Mookkaiya get Muthupechi's man married to the winning man. When Mookkaiya returns home, his wife berates him, saying he has no right to declare his daughter as a prize. Mookkaiya, realising his mistake and the precarious situation he has created, kills his bull and himself.

Malaichamy does not relent; he approaches the Karisalpatti Panchayat and demands that Muthupechi should be married to his person. The Panchayat refuses and advises Malaichamy to forget the bet. When Malaichamy challenges the Panchayat and demands Muthupechi, the Panchayat makes necessary arrangements to get Muthupechi married to Veerannan by the next morning so that this issue will end. When Veerannan is returning after getting the necessary items, he is attacked by Malaichami's hoodlums. He fights and knocks out some of them. Fearing arrest, he runs away from the village and everyone assumes him to be dead. Unrelenting, Malaichamy comes with his villagers, camps at Karisalpatti and demands that Muthupechi be given to him. When the Panchayat refuses, a fight erupts between the two villages. The police intervenes, bans the Panchayat and imposes restrictions on the movement of people in the villages. Enraged, Malaichamy closes the school run by him in Karisalpatti. However, the teachers plead with him and finally, run the school in the open.

To pressure the Karisalpatti villagers, Malaichamy orders his villagers to send back women who are natives of Karisalpatti, which leads to several women coming back to Karisalpatti. Muthupechi gets depressed with these happenings and feels guilty. But her villagers take it as a prestige issue and protect her. She is also worried about Veerannan, who has not contacted her or his mother after running away. The school teacher, who loves Muthupechi, understanding her emotional turmoil, sends her letters in Veerannan's name every week, which makes her happy and makes his family hope they will see him one day. A year passes, but the impasse between the two villages continues. One day, Muthupechi gets two letters: one from Veerannan announcing his arrival, the other from the teacher. She is excited and anxiously awaits Veerannan's arrival. The next day, Veerannan arrives with his wife. Both Ochayi and Muthupechi are shocked. Veerannan explains the situation which led to his leaving the village, his joining the army and marrying the girl to save her. Muthupechi empathises with his villagers. Malaichamy returns with his villagers and demands Muthupechi to be handed over to them.

The villagers of Karisalpatti decide that enough is enough and ask Veerannan to accept Muthupechi as his second wife to protect the village honour but Muthupechi refuses, keeping in mind the welfare of Veerannan's wife. The villagers get upset with her decision, excommunicate and leave them. Malaichamy gets the message that Muthupechi is no longer under the villagers' protection, reaches the village and abducts her. When Veerannan learns of this, he goes to fight with them and rescue her. In the fight, Veerannan's wife gets killed by Malaichamy. Enraged, Muthupechi takes the trident of the temple to kill Malaichamy. At the same time, Veerannan, after beating the other men, also comes to kill Malaichamy and succeeds. Muthupechi realises Veerannan's love for her as she dies.

== Cast ==
- Pandiyan as Veerannan
- Revathi as Muthupechi
- Vijayan as Mookkaiyan
- Gandhimathi as Ochayi
- Nizhalgal Ravi as a school teacher
- Vinu Chakravarthy as Malaichamy
- K. K. Soundar as a villager
- Janagaraj as a school teacher
- Gemini Rajeshwari as a villager
- Sathya as a street singer

== Production ==
The actor Pandiyan was spotted by director Bharathiraja, while seeing him selling bangles in Madurai and offered him the lead role in Mann Vasanai. Asha Kelunni Nair was spotted by Bharathiraja, who was searching for a new heroine for the same film, and went on to play the female lead of the film, making her acting debut. She was given the screen name Revathi. While filming the climax scene, Bharathiraja slapped Revathi to ensure that she cried as required for the script, rather than use glycerine.

== Soundtrack ==
The music was composed by Ilaiyaraaja.

Song	Singers	Lyrics	Duration
"Adi Kukkamma"	Malaysia Vasudevan, B. S. Sasirekha	Gangai Amaran	4:23
"Anantha Thenn"	Malaysia Vasudevan, S. Janaki	Panchu Arunachalam	4:28
"Indha Bhoomi"	Ilaiyaraaja	Gangai Amaran	2:30
"Poththi Vachcha" (Duet)	S. P. Balasubrahmanyam, S. Janaki	Vairamuthu	4:29
"Pothi Vacha" (Sad)	S. Janaki	Vairamuthu	4:33
"Vangadi Vangadi"	Malaysia Vasudevan, S. P. Sailaja	M. G. Vallabhan	4:35

== Release and reception ==
Mann Vasanai was released on 16 September 1983. Ananda Vikatan, in a review dated 2 October 1983, rated the film 48 out of 100. S. Shivakumar of Mid-Day wrote "A love story based on a real incident is a trifle too long with some unnecessary song sequences but all this is compensated for by the technical brilliance" and appreciated the performances of Pandian and Revathi. Jayamanmadhan of Kalki praised the acting of star cast, Kannan's cinematography and Ilaiyaraaja's music but felt as there is no care in plotting the story and what should be given in what proportion, when we come out of the theatre, only vibrations are left in our chest and concluded there is more of smell of blood than the smell of sand. The film ran for over 200 days in theatres. It won the Filmfare Award for Best Film – Tamil, and Revathi received Filmfare Special Award – South for her performance in the film.

== In other media ==
Mann Vasanai was parodied in the Star Vijay comedy series Lollu Sabha in an episode titled Masala Vasanai (transl. The Fragrance of Masala).
