= Koyil Kaalai =

- Theatrical release poster
- Directed by: Gangai Amaran
- Screenplay by: Gangai Amaran
- Story by: R. Selvaraj
- Produced by: Gangai Amaran; Ilaiyaraaja
- Starring: Vijayakanth; Kanaka; Sujatha
- Cinematography: A. Sabapathy
- Edited by: B. Lenin; V. T. Vijayan
- Music by: Ilaiyaraaja
- Production company: Amma's Pictures
- Release date: 14 January 1993
- Running time: 135 minutes
- Country: India
- Language: Tamil

Koyil Kaalai (transl. Temple Bull) is a 1993 Indian Tamil-language action drama film directed and co-produced by Gangai Amaran. The film stars Vijayakanth, Kanaka and Sujatha. The music was composed by Ilaiyaraaja who also co-produced the film. It was released on 14 January 1993, during Pongal, and became a success in rural and semi-rural areas.

== Plot ==
24 years ago, a couple, grief-stricken by the stillbirth of their child, pleaded with God to grant their baby life. Miraculously, the child was revived, and in gratitude, the parents dedicated him to the Uppiliyappan temple. The child, now grown, is Uppiliyappan "Uppili," a devoted temple aide who resides and takes care of the temple. The wealthy landlord, Sundaralingam, manages the temple's vast properties. Maragathammal, the newly appointed executive officer from the TNHRCE department, assumes charge of the temple. Maragathammal's daughter, Usha, was rendered mute after witnessing a tragic accident. Uppili's kindness and care help Usha develop a soft spot for him. Arasayi, an orphan, requests Maragathammal to allow her to stay in the temple. Instead, Maragathammal arranges alternative accommodation and a small coconut store for Arasayi with Uppili's assistance.

Sundaralingam who has taken a lease on the temple's land refuses to pay the rent dues despite Maragathammal's warnings. Arasayi playfully teases Uppili, developing feelings for him, but he doesn't reciprocate. Uppili works multiple jobs throughout the day to make ends meet. One day, he witnesses Murugesan stealing the temple jewels due to his family's poverty. Murugesan is caught, and mistakenly believing Uppili betrayed him, he vows to seek revenge. Unbeknownst to Murugesan, Uppili secretly resolves his family's poverty. Uppili also thwarts Sundaralingam's attempt to abduct the temple cows. However, Maragathammal informs Uppili that the cows have been officially released to Sundaralingam, rendering them powerless to intervene. Meanwhile, Sundaralingam, seeking revenge, pretends to be benevolent and proposes marriage to Usha. However, Maragathammal declines, and when Sundaralingam attempts to bribe her, she cleverly records it as a rent payment, infuriating him.

Usha finds solace in Uppili's words of encouragement and offers him a garland, as she holds Uppili in high esteem, equivalent to God, for his care and compassion. Seeing this, the devastated Arasayi, who had developed feelings for Uppili, decides to take her own life, but is rescued. The village panchayat intervenes, and Uppili chooses to marry Arasayi. After the marriage, Arasayi reveals her true intentions: she is Murugesan's daughter, and she manipulated Uppili into marrying her to exact revenge on Uppili, who had stolen the temple jewel and framed her father. Unbeknownst to Arasayi, Uppili had been secretly supporting her family financially. Meanwhile, Maragathammal ensures that Sundaralingam cannot use the temple land without paying the outstanding lease amount. Sundaralingam, in retaliation, sends men to attack Uppili, but he defends himself. Sundaralingam forms an alliance with Arasayi, and together, they falsely accuse Uppili of stealing the temple jewels. Arasayi feigns innocence, and the panchayat, deceived by their claims, punishes Uppili by expelling him from the temple. Murugesan is released from prison and advises Arasayi to reconcile with Uppili.

Upon learning that Uppili has been their benefactor all along, Murugesan overcome with guilt, confesses to Arasayi that he is the actual thief who stole the temple jewels and had falsely implicated Uppili. Arasayi, enraged by her father's deception, comes to understand Uppili's kind nature and seeks his forgiveness. However, Uppili, still hurt, rejects her apology, stating that he will forever be an orphan. Murugesan begs Uppili for pardon and urges him to accept Arasayi. Arasayi, filled with remorse, attempts to take her life by running towards a quarry where rocks are being blasted, but Uppili rescues her. That night, Sundaralingam steals the temple cows, witnessed by Usha. As she tries to intervene, Sundaralingam's men chase her, and he attempts to molest her. Uppili fights off the men and confronts Sundaralingam. In the chaos, Usha regains her speech and Sundaralingam undergoes a transformation. Ultimately, Uppili forgives Arasayi, and they reunite.

== Cast ==
- Vijayakanth as Uppiliyappan "Uppili"
- Kanaka as Arasayi
- Sujatha as Maragathammal, Executive Officer
- Veera Pandiyan as Sundaralingam
- Yuvarani as Usha, Maragathammal's daughter
- Mahima
- Valarmathi
- Shanmugasundaram as Murugesan, Arasayi's father
- Goundamani as Ramasamy
- Senthil
- Vadivelu as Vadivelu
- Karikol Raju
- Periya Karuppu Thevar
- Karuppu Subbiah
- Vellai Subbaiah
- T. K. S. Natarajan

== Soundtrack ==
The music was composed by Ilaiyaraaja. The song "Thaayundu Thanthai" is set in Mayamalavagowla, a Carnatic raga.

Track listing
No.	Title	Lyrics	Singer(s)	Length
1.	"Thavamirunthu"	Gangai Amaran	Chorus	4:19
2.	"Vanna Chintu"	Gangai Amaran	Mano, S. Janaki	5:01
3.	"Aariraaro"	Gangai Amaran	Mano	1:33
4.	"Thaayundu Thanthai"	Ilaiyaraaja	Ilaiyaraaja	5:00
5.	"Pallikoodam"	Gangai Amaran	S. Janaki, S. P. Balasubrahmanyam	4:56
6.	"Pallikoodam"	Gangai Amaran	S. P. Balasubrahmanyam	00:48
7.	"Sola Kiligal"	Gangai Amaran	S. Janaki, Mano	4:59
8.	"Thaayundu Thantai"	Ilaiyaraaja	Gangai Amaran	5:00
9.	"Adi Maana Madhuraiyile"	Gangai Amaran	S. P. Balasubrahmanyam, S. Janaki	5:00
Total length:				36:36

== Critical reception ==
Malini Mannath of The Indian Express wrote, "The film with screenplay-direction by Gangai Amaran has nothing new by way of story or narration". R. P. R. of Kalki criticised the film for its tiring plot, rotten sequences, lack of thrilling twists and three-to-four endings, adding that had the director applied his mind he would have at least made a perfect devotional film.

== Impact ==
In 2021, a man was arrested after being caught stealing and selling coconut water, which the media compared to a comedy scene from Koyil Kaalai.
