= Periya Veetu Pannakkaran =

- Title card
- Directed by: N. K. Viswanathan
- Written by: Rajavarman (dialogues)
- Story by: Sangili Murugan
- Produced by: Kalyani Murugan
- Starring: Karthik; Kanaka; M. N. Nambiar; S. S. Chandran
- Cinematography: N. K. Viswanathan
- Edited by: Rajkeerthi
- Music by: Ilaiyaraaja
- Production company: Meenakshi Arts
- Release date: 11 May 1990
- Country: India
- Language: Tamil

Periya Veetu Pannakkaran (transl. Big house farm man) is a 1990 Indian Tamil-language romance film, directed and photographed by N. K. Viswanathan in his directorial debut. The film stars Karthik, Kanaka, M. N. Nambiar and S. S. Chandran. It was released on 11 May 1990.

== Plot ==
Chellameena is the daughter of a wealthy big family. In the same village, Sundarapandi is the grandson of a poor farmer there. He is a do-gooder and is always rubbing the villains (Kanaka's cousins) the wrong way. When they both decide to get married after a few teasings and duets, her family refuses and gets Sundarapandi beaten, and his father gets killed in the process. Nambiar who resides in the next village, adopts him. After hearing his story, he extends his proposal to Chellameena's family, who still refuses despite Sundarapandi now having millions in his name thanks to Nambiar. The village horse festival is announced. After much violence and fights, Sundarapandi and Chellameena get together, and he wins the competition.

== Cast ==
- Karthik as Sundarapandi
- Kanaka as Chellameena
- M. N. Nambiar
- S. S. Chandran
- Gandhimathi
- Senthil
- Kovai Sarala
- Vijayakumar
- S. N. Lakshmi
- Y. Vijaya
- Sathyapriya
- Sangili Murugan
- Senthamarai
- Kallapetti Singaram

== Production ==
When N. K. Viswanathan was directing Inaindha Kaigal, Sangili Murugan requested him to direct a film for him which became Periya Veettu Pannakkaran. It was completed within a single schedule and became his directorial debut as it released before Inaindha Kaigal.

== Soundtrack ==
The music was composed by Ilaiyaraaja. The song "Nikkattumaa Pogattuma" is set in the Carnatic raga Vachaspati, and the songs "Muthu Muthu Medai" and "Malligaiye Malligaiye" are set in Sarasangi.

Song	Singers	Lyrics	Length
"Malligaiye Malligaiye"	K. S. Chithra, K. J. Yesudas	Na. Kamarasan	04:56
"Summa Nee"	Mano	Piraisoodan	04:28
"Vanthaara Vazha Vaikkum"	Ilaiyaraaja	Ilaiyaraaja	04:08
"Nikkattumaa Pogattuma"	Mano, K. S. Chithra	Mu. Metha	05:04
"Muthu Muthu Medai"	S. Janaki, K. J. Yesudas	Muthulingam	04:54
"Pattikaattu Paattu"	Malaysia Vasudevan	Gangai Amaran	04:48
"Pallaakku Kuthiraiyile"	Malaysia Vasudevan	Gangai Amaran	04:53

The movie was dubbed into Telugu as Prema Sasanam

Song	Singers
"Idhe Ra Naa Mata"	Mano
"Sandekada"	Mano
"Sandelamma"	S. P. Balasubramanyam, Sudha Radhakrishnan
"Pooche Poola"	Vani Jayaram, S. P. Balasubramanyam
"Mallikave"	S. P. Sailaja, S. P. Balasubramanyam
"Pallakilo"	S. P. Balasubramanyam
"Title Song"	S. P. Balasubramanyam

== Bibliography ==
- Sundararaman (2007) [2005]. Raga Chintamani: A Guide to Carnatic Ragas Through Tamil Film Music (2nd ed.). Pichhamal Chintamani. OCLC 295034757.
