= Atha Maga Rathiname =

- Directed by: Gangai Amaran
- Screenplay by: Gangai Amaran
- Story by: P. Kalaimani
- Produced by: Sheela Sivagnanam; S. S. Sivaram
- Starring: Selva; Ranjitha; Pandiyan; Viji
- Cinematography: A. Sabapathy
- Edited by: V. T. Vijayan; B. Lenin
- Music by: Gangai Amaran
- Production company: Sheela Cine Arts
- Release date: 8 December 1994
- Running time: 130 minutes
- Country: India
- Language: Tamil

Atha Maga Rathiname (transl. A Great Gem) is a 1994 Indian Tamil language drama film directed by Gangai Amaran. The film stars Selva, Ranjitha, Pandiyan and Viji. It was released on 8 December 1994.

== Plot ==
Muniyandi (Selva) and Pandiamma (Ranjitha) have been in love for many years. Muniyandi always wins his village's bull race against Minor Rajapandi (Pandiyan). Rajapandi is the village's richest man and has an eye on Pandiamma. Muniyandi's mother Angamma looks for a bride for his son and she finally finds the daughter of a rich man Vijaya (Viji). Angamma then tries to split Muniyandi and Pandiamma. What transpires next forms the rest of the story.

== Cast ==
- Selva as Muniyandi
- Ranjitha as Pandiamma
- Pandiyan as Minor Rajapandi
- Viji as Vijaya
- Manorama as Pappamma
- Gandhimathi as Angamma
- Vadivelu
- Vennira Aadai Moorthy
- S. S. Sivaram
- C. R. Saraswathi as Pudukkottai Sundari
- Disco Shanti
- Shanmugasundari
- Suguna
- Ramumachan
- Kalaimani
- Theni Shanmugam
- Rajendran
- Ravikanth

== Soundtrack ==
The soundtrack was composed by Gangai Amaran who also wrote the lyrics.

Song	Singer(s)	Duration
"Alli Alli Thantha Neela"	Jayachandran	5:31
"Alli Alli Veesuthama"	S. Janaki	5:31
"Engayo Valukkuthaiye"	S. Janaki	5:20
"Ethukkara Ala"	Suresh Peters, Annupamaa	4:31
"Mampoove"	K. S. Chithra, S. N. Surendar	5:16
"Mandha Velliyele"	S. P. Balasubrahmanyam	4:34
"Neenga Vanthathume"	Malaysia Vasudevan, Nirmala	5:44
