= Sathan Sollai Thattathe =

- Directed by: Rama Narayanan
- Written by: Rama Narayanan
- Produced by: Pulamaipithan
- Starring: Senthil; Pandiyan; Chandrasekhar; Janagaraj; Kanaka
- Music by: Shankar–Ganesh
- Production company: Cuckoo Films
- Release date: 21 September 1990
- Country: India
- Language: Tamil

Sathan Sollai Thattathe (transl. Do not disobey Satan's words) is a 1990 Indian Tamil-language fantasy comedy film, directed by Rama Narayanan. The film features an ensemble cast featuring Senthil in the titular role alongside Pandiyan, Chandrasekhar, Janagaraj and Kanaka with S. S. Chandran, K. K. Soundar, Kovai Sarala and Ilavarasan in supporting roles. The film deals with the exploits of a genie which comes out of an old violin, and how he helps three innocent and poor men in their lives. It was released on 21 September 1990. The film was a major turning point in Senthil's career. It has developed a cult following over the years.

== Plot ==
Murthy, Gopinath and Sekar are three friends who live together and share a close bond with each other. Even though they are highly qualified, they find it difficult to get a job and spend most of their days in poverty. They do any small chores available to keep their daily lives rolling. Bhuvana and her father and mother are their neighbours. Bhuvana feels pity for the three friends and helps them whenever possible.

One day on his way home, Murthy enters an auction sale (while trying to hide from his money lenders). The auction sale is run by Chitra's father and mother, who cheat people by portraying unused and old items as ancient and priceless artefacts. Due to a misunderstanding during the auction, Murthy is forced to buy a violin from Bhuvana's father. Even though Gopinath and Sekar are angry with Murthy for spending money on an unnecessary item, they forgive him later on. Murthy, Sekar and Gopinath happen to meet Chitra in separate incidents, and each of them develop a liking for her. Murthy tries to use his violin to impress Chitra, but fails miserably at his attempt. After a few days, while the three friends are walking in a remote place, Sekar in a bout of frustration breaks the violin. They are shocked to see a Genie come out of the violin. Though initially scared, they find the Genie extremely friendly and helpful and the four of them become good friends. They name the Genie "Sathaiya". Sathaiya was Emperor Alauddin's 12th Genie, and was locked up in the violin after a magician had cast a spell on him. Since the three friends rescued him from the violin, Sathaiya officially declares himself as their slave and helps them with magical powers. Sathaiya uses his powers to provide them with food, a new house and a lot of wealth. The three friends become extremely rich.

Madan is Chitra's Uncle, and wants to marry Chitra, but her father wants to offer his daughter's hand only to the person who gives him one million rupees as dowry. Madan is part of a smuggling gang, and uses his brother-in-law's auction business to move diamonds and other smuggled items. After he gives a million rupees to his brother-in-law, his wedding with Chitra is arranged. Chitra, who doesn't agree to the wedding, runs away from her home and hides in a bungalow. To her surprise, the bungalow happens to belong to Murthy, Sekar and Gopinath. The three of them agree to let Chitra stay in their bungalow. Slowly the three friends enter into arguments with each other and their friendship starts turning sour, as all three of them try to woo Chitra. After Sathaiya advises them not to fight and let Chitra choose whom she wants to marry, they agree. Chitra finally decides to marry Murthy.

One day, Sathaiya reveals that his grandfather was also trapped in an old lamp many centuries ago, and requests the three friends to get such lamps from ancient artefact auctions, so he can find his grandfather. Murthy and Sekar go to Chitra's father's auction again and get fooled into buying a lamp from him. But unbeknownst to them, Madan had hidden some diamonds in that lamp for his smuggling trade, and is now frustrated that the lamp is gone. Sathaiya suggests to the three friends to use the diamond to impress Chitra's father, so that he will agree to offer Chitra's hand to Murthy. Upon finding that his wedding dreams are going to be shattered, Madan informs the police about the diamonds. After police confiscate the diamonds, Sathaiya converts them into sugar cubes, thus saving all of them from being imprisoned. Chitra's father now disappointed with the fake diamonds, berates the three friends and asks them to leave, and decides to get Chitra married to Madan. At home, Gopinath and Murthy get into an argument with Sathaiya since Murthy's wedding is now stopped. Gopinath tells Sathaiya that they should've given the diamonds to the police on the very first day, rather than use it for the wedding. After Gopinath and Murthy start hurling insults at Sathaiya, he becomes heart-broken and decides to leave them. He tells them that he will re-appear when they truly believe in him and think of him in their hearts again.

After a few days, the three friends read an article in the paper where someone offers his kidney and other organs for sale. When they visit the house of that person, they find that he is their old neighbour Bhuvana's father. Bhuvana's father has lost his job and is forced to take this extreme step to get Bhuvana married. The three friends promise to help him get his daughter married and solve all his problems. But Bhuvana reveals to them that someone called Ashok had betrayed her after making her pregnant and that Ashok he will soon marry another girl. They find out that Ashok is none other than Madan. Madan's henchmen inform Madan that the three friends are coming to stop the wedding. Upon hearing this, Madan kidnaps Chitra after tying up her father. Now, the three friends desperately seek the help of Sathaiya to save Chitra and her family. Sathaiya appears and helps in chasing down the bad guys with his magical powers. He conjures up incredible state-of-the-art vehicles which function as a car and also transforms into a boat when needed. He drives the vehicles up buildings and rooftops, and finally they manage to chase down the criminals and overpower them. After Chitra and Murthy are re-united, the three friends request Sathaiya to stay with them, but Sathaiya tells them that he has to go, but will forever remain in good people's hearts and will help the kind-hearted whenever necessary.

== Cast ==
- Senthil as Sathan "Sathaiya"
- Pandiyan as Murthy
- Chandrasekhar as Sekar
- Janagaraj as Gopinath
- Kanaka as Chitra
- S. S. Chandran as Chitra's father, an auction businessman
- Kovai Sarala as Chitra's mother
- Yuvasree as Bhuvana
- K. K. Soundar as Bhuvana's father
- Ilavarasan as Madan
- Perarasu as guy at park

== Production ==
The idea of a genie helping youngsters was prevalent in the film Pattanathil Bhootham (1967).

== Soundtrack ==
Soundtrack was composed by Shankar–Ganesh and lyrics by Pulamaipithan.

Track listing
No.	Title	Singer(s)	Length
1.	"Poo Parikka"	Mano, Suja Radhakrishnan
2.	"Chinna Ponnu"	Mano, Vivek Sarathy
3.	"Maan Kutti Mella"	Mano, Vivek Sarathy
4.	"Namma Naattula"	Malaysia Vasudevan, Mano
5.	"Poo Parikka"	Mano, Suja Radhakrishnan
