= A. V. Ramanan =

Tamil television host, singer, and actor

- Born: Aravamudan Venkata Ramanan
- Occupations: Actor; television host; singer
- Spouse: Uma Ramanan

Aravamudan Venkata Ramanan is a Tamil television host, singer and actor. He became a household name in Tamil Nadu during his hosting of the Sun TV program Saptha Swarangal.

== Personal life ==
Ramanan married playback singer Uma Ramanan. Along with being an actor and singer, he is also a whistler, working with the Indian Whistler's Association. He can do bird-calls.

== Filmography ==
=== Actor ===
- Kadhal Kadhal Kadhal (1980)
- Chatriyan (1990) – Police Officer
- Ennavalle (2001) – Special appearance as Sapthaswarangal host
- Boys (2003) – Siddharth's father
- Madhurey (2004) – Officer Karthikeyan

=== Composer ===
- Neerottam (1979)
- Kadhal Kadhal Kadhal (1980)

=== Singer ===
- Netroru Menagai – Manmadha Leelai (1976)
- Mohana Kannan (with Uma Ramanan) – Sri Krishna Leela (1977)
- Oru Athukku – Rudra Thandavam (1978)
- En Chella Peru Apple (with Suchitra) – Pokkiri (2007)
