= Kanaka (actress) =

Indian actress (born 1973)

- Born: Kanaka Mahalakshmi Devadoss; 14 July 1973 (age 52)
- Other names: Kanaga
- Occupation: Actor
- Years active: 1989–2000
- Mother: Devika
- Relatives: Raghupathi Venkaiah Naidu (great-grandfather)

Kanaka Mahalakshmi Devadoss, known mononymously as Kanaka, is an Indian former actress who appeared in Tamil, Telugu and Malayalam language films. She is known of her role in her debut Tamil film Karakattakkaran (1989).

== Personal life ==
Kanaka is the daughter of actress Devika. She is also the great-granddaughter of Telugu cinema pioneer, Raghupathi Venkaiah Naidu.

== Career ==
She started her career as a heroine in the Tamil movie Karakattakkaran, directed by Gangai Amaran, a blockbuster movie which ran more than a year. Kanaka acted in many Tamil movies, including Periya Veetu Pannakkaran (1990), Athisaya Piravi (1990), Samundi (1992), Periya Kudumbam (1995), Simmarasi (1998) and Viralukketha Veekkam (1999). She also starred in a few Telugu and Malayalam movies with major stars like Mukesh, Mammootty and Mohanlal. She has acted in more than 50 films in Tamil, Malayalam and Telugu in a span of 10 years.

== Filmography ==
Year	Film	Role	Language	Notes
1989	Karakattakkaran	Kamakshi	Tamil	
1989	Thangamana Raasa	Kannamma	Tamil	
1990	Seetha	Seetha	Tamil	
1990	Muthalali Amma	Kaveri	Tamil	
1990	Periya Idathu Pillai	Geetha	Tamil	
1990	Periya Veetu Pannakkaran	Chella Meena	Tamil	
1990	Athisaya Piravi	Gowri	Tamil	
1990	Durga	Kannamma	Tamil	
1990	Enga Ooru Aattukkaran	Unknown	Tamil	
1990	Sathan Sollai Thattathe	Chitra	Tamil	
1990	Amman Kovil Thiruvizha	Bhavani	Tamil	
1990	Vellaiya Devan	Santhi	Tamil	
1990	Ethir Kaatru	Anita	Tamil	
1991	Kumbakarai Thangaiah	Mangamma	Tamil	
1991	Sendhoora Devi	Selvi	Tamil	
1991	Thalattu Ketkuthamma	Pechiamma	Tamil	
1991	Brahmarshi Vishwamitra	Sita	Telugu	
1991	Godfather	Malu	Malayalam	
1992	Purushan Enakku Arasan	Kalpana	Tamil	
1992	Valu Jada Tolu Beltu	Seetha	Telugu	
1992	Vasudha	Varsha	Malayalam	
1992	Ezhara Ponnana	Ashwathi	Malayalam	
1992	Mudhal Kural	Vaali	Tamil	
1992	Samundi	Ponnuthayi	Tamil	
1992	Vietnam Colony	Unnimol	Malayalam	
1993	Koyil Kaalai	Arasaayi	Tamil	
1993	Sakkarai Devan	Dhanam	Tamil	
1993	Thaali Kattiya Raasa	Mythili	Tamil	
1993	Kilipetchu Ketkava	Sivagami	Tamil	
1993	Golanthara Vartha	Rajani	Malayalam	
1994	Vardhakya Puranam	Rajani	Malayalam	
1994	Sakthivel	Lalli	Tamil	
1994	Pingami	Sridevi	Malayalam	
1994	Jallikattu Kaalai	Radha	Tamil	
1995	Kusruthikaatu	Indira	Malayalam	
1995	Mangala Soothram	Indu	Malayalam	
1995	Periya Kudumbam	Jyothi	Tamil	
1996	Katta Panchayathu	Shenbagam	Tamil	
1997	Mannadiar Penninu Chenkotta Checkan	Archa	Malayalam	
1997	Bhoopathi	Lakshmi	Malayalam	
1998	Manthri Kochamma	Maya	Malayalam	
1998	Simmarasi	Lakhsmi	Tamil	
1998	Thalaimurai	Herself	Tamil	
1999	Viralukketha Veekkam	Malu	Tamil	
2000	Narasimham	Indulekha	Malayalam	
2000	Ee Mazha Then Mazha	Rekha	Malayalam	
