= Amman Kovil Thiruvizha =

- VCD cover
- Directed by: P. R. Somasundar
- Screenplay by: P. Kalaignanam
- Story by: P. Kalaignanam
- Produced by: Murugan Kalaignanam
- Starring: Nizhalgal Ravi; Kanaka
- Cinematography: Viswam Natraj
- Edited by: K. R. Ramalingham
- Music by: Ilaiyaraaja
- Production company: Sri Bhairavi Combines
- Release date: 17 October 1990
- Country: India
- Language: Tamil

Amman Kovil Thiruvizha is a 1990 Indian Tamil-language devotional film directed by Murugan Kalainjanam. The film stars Nizhalgal Ravi and Kanaka. It was released on 17 October 1990.

== Cast ==
- Nizhalgal Ravi
- Kanaka
- Goundamani
- Senthil
- Kovai Sarala

== Soundtrack ==
The music was composed by Ilaiyaraaja.

Track listing
No.	Title	Lyrics	Singer(s)	Length
1.	"Maduran Oyilattam"	Piraisoodan	K. S. Chithra, Malaysia Vasudevan	5:01
2.	"Naan Sonnal" (happy)	Vaali	Mano, S. Janaki	5:10
3.	"Vasamulla"	Na. Kamarasan	Ilaiyaraaja	4:55
4.	"Dheivam Thanda"	Ilaiyaraaja	Ilaiyaraaja	4:03
5.	"Naan Sonnal" (pathos)	Vaali	S. Janaki	4:50
6.	"Desamuthu"	Gangai Amaran	K. S. Chithra, Malaysia Vasudevan	5:10
7.	"Naan Sonnal"	Vaali	Ilaiyaraaja	5:10
Total length:				34:19
