= Gandhimathi =

Indian actress (1940–2011)

- Born: 30 August 1940; Manamadurai, Sivagangai District, India
- Died: 9 September 2011 (age 71); Chennai, India
- Occupation: Actress
- Years active: 1957–2011

Gandhimathi (30 August 1940 – 9 September 2011) was an Indian stage and film actress. She acted in over 500 films.

== Early life ==
Kanthimathi was born in Manamadurai in what was then the Ramanathapuram district of India. She started acting in dramas and entered films at the age of eleven.

== Career ==
The role which got her noticed was the portrayal of Mayil's mother in the 1977 Tamil-language film 16 Vayathinile. Other important Tamil films she appeared in include Mann Vasanai, Muthu and Karagattakaran. She was awarded the Kalaimamani Award by the Government of Tamil Nadu for her contribution to Tamil cinema.

She acted as mother and grandmother almost to all actors and actresses like M.G.R, Rajinikanth, Kamalhassan, Vijaykanth, Sathyaraj, Prabhu, Vijay, Revathi, Radha, Ambika, Radhika, etc. Other actors or actresses cannot utter the non-lexical filler proverbs like "Chithada kalli viragu odaika ponalam kathala mullu kothoda kuthidichan" (When a lazy girl is forced to go for the work of cutting the firewood she may complain that aloe vera thorns poked her in a bunch) like she could.

== Partial filmography ==
=== 1940s ===
List of 1940s film credits
Year	Title	Role	Notes
1948	Vedhala Ulagam		

=== 1960s ===
List of 1960s film credits
Year	Title	Role	Notes
1965	Iravum Pagalum		
1966	Kumari Penn		
1966	Thenmazhai		
1969	Adimai Penn		
1969	Thirudan	Guest role	

=== 1970s ===
List of 1970s film credits
Year	Title	Role	Notes
1970	Thedi Vandha Mappillai	Chellam	
1970	Kalam Vellum		
1970	Thirumalai Thenkumari		
1971	Savaale Samali		
1971	Thangaikkaaga	Akilandam	
1972	Nawab Naarkali		
1972	Raja	Radha's Mother	
1972	Pattikada Pattanama		
1972	Thavaputhalvan		
1972	Needhi		
1973	Engal Thanga Raja		
1973	Suryakanthi		
1973	Rajaraja Cholan		
1973	Ponnunjal		
1974	En Magan	Thangam	
1974	Vani Rani		
1974	Netru Indru Naalai	Doctor	
1974	Naan Avanillai		
1974	Athaiya Mamiya		
1975	Ninaithadhai Mudippavan		
1975	Dr. Siva		
1975	Melnaattu Marumagal		
1975	Mayangukiral Oru Maadhu		
1975	Anbe Aaruyire		
1977	16 Vayathinile	Kuruvammal	
1978	Vanakkatukuriya Kathaliye		
1978	Kizhakke Pogum Rail	Karuthamma	
1979	Inikkum Ilamai		
1979	Lakshmi		
1979	Manthoppu Kiliye		
1979	Suvarilladha Chiththirangal		

=== 1980s ===
List of 1980s film credits
Year	Title	Role	Notes
1980	Enga Ooru Rasathi		
1980	Rusi Kanda Poonai		
1980	Moodu Pani		
1980	Bhama Rukmani		
1981	Indru Poi Naalai Vaa		
1981	Oruthi Mattum Karaiyinile		
1981	Bala Nagamma		
1981	Andhi Mayakkam		
1982	Erattai Manithan		
1982	Moondram Pirai		
1982	Raagam Thedum Pallavi		
1982	Neram Vandhachu		
1983	Mann Vasanai	Ochaayi	
1983	Uyirullavarai Usha		
1984	Tharaasu		
1984	Uravai Kaatha Kili		
1984	Vai Pandal		
1985	Mannukketha Ponnu		
1985	Thendrale Ennai Thodu	Sundari	
1985	Engal Kural		
1985	Puthiya Theerpu		
1985	Saavi	Pachaiyamma	
1985	Chidambara Rahasiyam	Ponnazhagi	
1986	Natpu		
1986	Aayiram Kannudayaal		
1986	Mannukkul Vairam		
1987	Chinna Thambi Periya Thambi		
1987	Ninaive Oru Sangeetham		
1987	Ini Oru Sudhanthiram		
1988	Therkathi Kallan		
1989	Panthaya Kuthiraigal		
1989	Karagattakaran		
1989	Solaikuyil		
1989	Padicha Pulla		
1989	Thangamana Raasa		
1989	Annanukku Jai		
1989	En Arumai Manaivi		
1989	Manidhan Marivittan		

=== 1990s ===
List of 1990s film credits
Year	Title	Role	Notes
1990	Mallu Vetti Minor		
1990	Sandhana Kaatru		
1990	Periya Veetu Pannakkaran		
1990	En Kadhal Kanmani	Roadside shop owner	
1991	Gnana Paravai		
1991	Kumbakarai Thangaiah		
1991	Namma Ooru Mariamma		
1992	Senbaga Thottam		
1992	Unna Nenachen Pattu Padichen		
1992	Oor Mariyadhai		
1992	Idhu Namma Bhoomi		
1992	Thirumathi Palanisamy		
1992	Nadodi Pattukkaran		
1992	Solaiyamma		
1993	Walter Vetrivel		
1993	Thalattu		
1993	Sakkarai Devan		
1993	Chinna Jameen		
1994	Oru Vasantha Geetham		
1994	Namma Annachi		
1994	Atha Maga Rathiname		
1994	Ilaignar Ani		
1995	Aanazhagan		
1995	Mr. Madras		
1995	Muthu	Poongavanam	
1995	Varraar Sandiyar		
1996	Amman Kovil Vaasalile		
1996	Namma Ooru Raasa		
1997	Nalla Manusukkaran		
1997	Vivasaayi Magan		
1997	Namma Ooru Raasa		
1999	Nesam Pudhusu		

=== 2000s ===
List of 2000s film credits
Year	Title	Role	Notes
2001	Ponnana Neram		
2001	Thavasi	Priyadarshini's grandmother	
2003	Anbu Thollai		
2004	Virumaandi		
2004	Settai	Pankajam	
2004	Oru Murai Sollividu		
2005	Ayya		
2006	Iyappa Saamy		

== TV Series ==
- 2004-2007 My Dear Bhootham as Moosa's Grandmother (Sun TV)
- 2004-2007 Kalki (Jaya TV)
- 2005 Kolangal as Narayanan's sister (Sun TV)
- 2010-2011 Pondatti Thevai (Sun TV)
