= Uma Ramanan =

- Born: 1954/1955
- Died: 1 May 2024 (aged 72) Chennai, Tamil Nadu, India
- Genre: Carnatic
- Occupations: Playback singer, stage performer
- Years active: 1976–2024

Uma Ramanan (1954/1955 – 1 May 2024) was an Indian playback singer, predominantly in the Tamil language. She was also a live stage performer who appeared in more than 6,000 concerts spanning 35 years. Ramanan came from the Tamil Nadu state of India.

== Personal life and background ==
Whilst studying, Ramanan went through classical music training under Pazhani Vijayalakshmi. She participated in many inter-collegiate competitions and won several rewards and accolades. Later, she met A. V. Ramanan, a television host, performer and actor, who was on the look out for fresh voices for his stage concerts. From then, Uma and Ramanan became duo stage performers.

Uma Ramanan was also a dancer trained under Padma Subrahmanyam. She died in Chennai on 1 May 2024, at the age of 72.

== Career ==
=== Playback singing ===
During Uma's engagement with Ramanan's stage shows, noted producer — cameraman, Janakiraman offered both of them a duet in his 1976 released Hindi film Play Boy. The same pair got an offer to sing for the Tamil film Shri Krishna Leela in 1977 directed by A. P. Nagarajan and one of the last assignments of composer S. V. Venkatraman. In 1980, she sang for the A. V. Ramanan composed film Neerottam. However, it was "Poongathave Thaal Thirava" song for the film Nizhalgal released in the same year and composed by Ilayaraja that brought her to the front running singers list. It gave her a big career break and she went on to record more than 100 songs with Ilayaraja alone. She has also sung for other music directors namely Vidyasagar, Deva and Mani Sharma.

=== Professional rapport with Ilayaraja ===
Uma Ramanan along with some of her contemporaries is considered to be one of the rare finds of Ilayaraja in his career. She has recorded some of her career best songs under the music composition of Ilayaraja.

Some of her major hits with Ilayaraja include :

- 1980 – "Poongathave Thaal Thirava" (Nizhalgal)
- 1980 – "Aasai Raaja Aariroe" (Moodu Pani)
- 1981 – "Aanada Raagam" (Panneer Pushpangal)
- 1981 – "Manjal Veyyil" (Nandu)
- 1981 – "Amudhae Thamizhae" (Kovil Pura)
- 1981 – "Vaanamae Mazhai Maegamae" (Madhu Malar)
- 1981 – "Daaham Edukira Naeram" (Enakaaga Kaathiru)
- 1981 – "Palli Araikkul" (Baala Naagammaa)
- 1982 – "Bhoopalam Isaikkum" (Thooral Ninnu Pochchu)
- 1983 – "Sevvandhi Pookalil" (Mella Paesungal)
- 1983 – "Sevvarrali Thotathilae" (Bhagavathipuram Railway Gate)
- 1983 – "Aathaadi Adhisayam" (Manavi Sollae Mandhiram)
- 1984 – "Kasthuri Maane" (Pudhumai Penn)
- 1984 – "Kaadhil Kaetadhu Oru Paatu" (Anbae Odi Vaa)
- 1984 – "Maegham Karukkayilae" (Vaidehi Kaathirunthaal)
- 1985 – "Kanmani Nee Vara" (Thendrale Ennai Thodu)
- 1985 – "Ponn Maanae" (Oru Kaidhiyin Diary)
- 1986 – "Yaar Thoorigai" (Paaru Paaru Pattinam Paaru)
- 1990 – "Nee Pathi Naan Pathi Kanne" (Keladi Kanmani)
- 1990 – "Aagaya Vennilave" (Arangetra Velai)
- 1990 – "Unna Paartha Nerathula" (Mallu Vetti Minor)
- 1994 – "Ooradangum Samathile" (Pudhupatti Ponnuthayi)
- 1995 – "Nil Nil Nil Badhil Sol" (Pattu Paadava)
- 1995 – "Velli Nilave" ("Nandhavana Theru")
- 1995 – "Poochudum punnivaname" ("Aanazhagan")

== Discography ==
Year	Film	Song title	Music director	Co-singer
1977	Sri Krishna Leela	Mohana Kannan Murali	S. V. Venkatraman	A. V. Ramanan
1980	Nizhalgal	Poongathave Thaal Thirava	Ilaiyaraaja	Deepan Chakravarthy
1980	Neerottam	Aasai Irukkuthu Nenjukkulle	A. V. Ramanan	A. V. Ramanan
1980	Moodu Pani	Aasai Raaja Aariroe	Ilaiyaraaja	
1981	Bala Nagamma	Palli Araikkul	Ilaiyaraaja	
1981	Enakaaga Kaathiru	Daagam Edukira Naeram	Ilaiyaraaja	
1981	Garjanai	Enna Sugamana Ulagam	Ilaiyaraaja	Malaysia Vasudevan
1981	Kudumbam Oru Kadambam	Kalviyil Saraswati	M. S. Viswanathan	Vani Jairam, S. P. Sailaja & B. S. Sasirekha
1981	Madhu Malar	Vaanamae Mazhai Maegamae	Ilaiyaraaja	K. J. Yesudas
1981	Nandu	Manjal Veyyil Maalai	Ilaiyaraaja	
1981	Panneer Pushpangal	Aaanadha Raagam	Ilaiyaraaja	
1981	Kovil Pura	Amudhe Tamizhe	Ilaiyaraaja	P. Susheela
1982	Kanne Radha	Kulunga Kulunga Ilamai Sirikkudhu	Ilaiyaraaja	
1982	Kavithai Malar	Alaigale Vaa Avarudan Vaa	Ilaiyaraaja	S. P. Balasubrahmanyam
1982	Nambinal Nambungal	Disco Sangeetham Than	Gangai Amaren	Deepan Chakravarthy
1982	Thooral Ninnu Pochchu	Bhoopalam Isaikkum	Ilaiyaraaja	K. J. Yesudas
1983	Bhagavathipuram Railway Gate	Sevvarrali Thotathilae	Ilaiyaraaja	Ilaiyaraaja
1983	Indru Nee Naalai Naan	Thaazham Poove Kannurangu	Ilaiyaraaja	S. P. Balasubrahmanyam & S. Janaki
1983	Manaivi Solle Manthiram	Aathaadi Adhisayam	Ilaiyaraaja	K. J. Yesudas
1983	Mella Paesungal	Koovina Poogkuyil.... Sevvanthi Pookkalil Seidha Veedu	Ilaiyaraaja	Deepan Chakravarthy
1984	Anbe Odi Vaa	Kaadhil Kaetadhu Oru Paatu	Ilaiyaraaja	
1984	Kadamai		Shankar–Ganesh	
1984	Vaidehi Kathirunthal	Maegham Karukkayilae	Ilaiyaraaja	Ilaiyaraaja
1985	Ketti Melam	Dhaagame Undaanathe	Ilaiyaraaja	K. J. Yesudas
1984	Naalai Unathu Naal	Alai Alaiyaai Pala Aasaigale	Ilaiyaraaja	
1985	Oru Kaidhiyin Diary	Ponn Maanae Kovam Eno	Ilaiyaraaja	Unni Menon
1984	Pudhumai Penn	Kasthoori Maane	Ilaiyaraaja	K. J. Yesudas
1985	Thiramai	Indha Azhagu Deepam	Shankar–Ganesh	Malaysia Vasudevan
1985	Thendrale Ennai Thodu	Kanmani Nee Vara	Ilaiyaraaja	K. J. Yesudas
1986	Kodai Mazhai	Pala Pala Pala Kuruvi	Ilaiyaraaja	Devie Neithiyar
1986	Mounam Kalaikirathu	Maalai Neram	Shankar–Ganesh	Ramesh
1986	Muthal Vasantham	Aarum Athu Aazhamilla	Ilaiyaraaja	
1986	Paru Paru Pattanam Paru	Yaar Thoorigai Thandha Oviyam	Ilaiyaraaja	S. P. Balasubrahmanyam
1986	Thazhuvatha Kaigal	Kudumbathai Uruvakka Sonnaal	Ilaiyaraaja	S. P. Sailaja, B. S. Sasirekha & Saibaba
1986	Thazhuvatha Kaigal	Naanoru Chinnapaathaan	Ilaiyaraaja	B. S. Sasirekha
1987	Aayusu Nooru	Brahma Devan Avan	T. Rajendar	S. P. Balasubrahmanyam
1987	Oru Thayin Sabhatham	Raakoli Koovaiyile	T. Rajendar	S. P. Balasubrahmanyam
1987	Veeran Veluthambi	Adi Kattazahagu Maane	S. A. Rajkumar	Mano
1988	Atthanaiperum Uttharmarthana	Pudhu Rosa Allu	Kannan Latha	Latha Kannan
1988	Poovukkul Boogambam	Naal Varudhu Naal Varudhu	Sangeetha Rajan	
1989	En Thangai	Madhuvin Mayakam	S. A. Rajkumar	Kalyan
1989	Manasukketha Maharasa	Manjakulikira Pinju Kuruvikku	Deva	
1989	Oru Ponnu Nenacha	Uthayame Uyire Nilave	S. A. Rajkumar	S. P. Balasubrahmanyam
1989	Paandi Nattu Thangam	Elalam Kuyiley Elemara Veyiley	Ilaiyaraaja	S. P. Balasubrahmanyam
1989	Ponmana Selvan	Inimela Nalla Neramthaan	Ilaiyaraaja	Malaysia Vasudevan
1989	Thendral Sudum	Aatthaadi Allikodi	Ilaiyaraaja	
1989	Vaai Kozhuppu		Chandrabose	
1988	Veedu Manaivi Makkal	Sengallai Thookara	Shankar–Ganesh	Malaysia Vasudevan
1990	60 Naal 60 Nimidam 6	Undhan Kannukul	KannanLatha	Mano
1990	Arangetra Velai	Aagaya Vennilave	Ilaiyaraaja	K. J. Yesudas
1990	Ethir Kaatru	Raja Illa	Ilaiyaraaja	Arunmozhi
1990	Ethir Kaatru	Ingu Irukkum	Ilaiyaraaja	
1990	Keladi Kanmani	Nee Pathi Naan Pathi Kanne	Ilaiyaraaja	K. J. Yesudas
1990	Keladi Kanmani	Thanniyila Nananja (not picturized in the movie)	Ilaiyaraaja	
1990	Mallu Vetti Minor	Unna Paartha Nerathula	laiyaraaja	Malaysia Vasudevan
1990	Mallu Vetti Minor	Adi Matthalam	laiyaraaja	Malaysia Vasudevan & K. S. Chithra
1990	Mallu Vetti Minor	Chinna Mani	laiyaraaja	K. J. Yesudas & K. S. Chithra
1990	Palaivana Paravaigal	Muthu Sambaa	Ilaiyaraaja	Malaysia Vasudevan
1990	Pulan Visaranai	Kuyiley Kuyiley	Ilaiyaraaja	K. J. Yesudas
1991	Anbu Sangili	Mandhira Punnagai	Ilaiyaraaja	
1991	Ennarukil Nee Irunthal	Oh Unaale Naan	Ilaiyaraaja	Mano
1991	Kumbakarai Thangaiah	Poothu Poothu Kulunguthadi	Ilaiyaraaja	S. P. Balasubrahmanyam
1991	Mill Thozhilali	Kalyana Solai Kuyile	Deva	K. J. Yesudas
1991	Moondrezhuthil En Moochirukkum	Pottu Vachcha Poove	Ilayagangai	S. P. Balasubrahmanyam & Gogulanan
1991	Pudhu Nellu Pudhu Naathu	Aei Marikolunthu Ennammaa Krishnaveni	Ilaiyaraaja	K. S. Chithra
1991	Thanthu Vitten Ennai	Muthamma Muthu Muthu	Ilaiyaraaja	Arunmozhi
1991	En Mamanukku Nalla Manasu	Megam Mazhai Thooral	Sirpy	S. P. Balasubrahmanyam
1992	Puthiya Swarangal	Oh Vaanamulla Kaalam	Ilaiyaraaja	K. J. Yesudas
1992	Thambi Pondatti	Kannan Vanthathaale	Ilaiyaraaja	
1993	Chinna Mapillai	Kanmanikkul Chinna	Ilaiyaraaja	S. P. Balasubrahmanyam & Minmini
1993	Enga Thambi	Ithu Maanodu Mayilaadum Kaadu	Ilaiyaraaja	Arunmozhi
1993	Manikuyil	Thaneerilea Mugam Paarkkum	Ilaiyaraaja	Mano
1993	Manikuyil	Kaadhal Nilaavey	Ilaiyaraaja	Arunmozhi
1993	Pon Vilangu	Sandana Kumba Udambula	Ilaiyaraaja	Mano
1993	Walter Vetrivel	Poongaatru Inge Vandhu	Ilaiyaraaja	Mano
1994	Mahanadhi	Sri Ranga Ranganathanin	Ilaiyaraaja	S P Balasubrahmanyam & Mahanadhi Shobana
1994	Mettupatti Mirasu	Mangalam Mangalame	M. S. Sriraj	K. J. Yesudas & K. S. Chithra
1994	Periya Marudhu	Singaarama Nalla	Ilaiyaraaja	
1994	Pudhupatti Ponnuthayi	Ooradangum Samathile	Ilaiyaraaja	Swarnalatha
1994	Sevatha Ponnu	Chittiraiyil Thirumanam	Deva	S. P. Balasubrahmanyam
1994	Sevvanthi	Vasa Malli Pooovu	Ilaiyaraaja	
1994	Thendral Varum Theru	Amma Pillaiya	Ilaiyaraaja	Mano
1995	Oru Oorla Oru Rajakumari	Ethanai Naalaa	Ilaiyaraaja	Mano
1995	Aanazhagan	Poo Choodum	Ilaiyaraaja	Swarnalatha
1995	Chinna Vathiyar	Atha Maga Rathiname	Ilaiyaraaja	Malaysia Vasudevan
1995	Paattu Padava	Nil Nil Nil Badhil Sol	Ilaiyaraaja	Ilaiyaraaja
1995	Pullakuttikaran	Pothum Eduththa Jenmamae	Deva	Arunmozhi
1995	Nandhavana Theru	Velli Nilave Velli Nilave	Ilaiyaraaja	S. P. Balasubrahmanyam
1997	Abhimanyu	Thai Unakku	Deva	
1997	Arasiyal	Vaa Sagi Vaa Sagi	Vidyasagar	Harish Raghavendra
1997	Pudhayal	Ochamma Ochamma	Vidyasagar	S. P. Balasubrahmanyam & Unni Menon
1997	Sishya	Yaro Azhaithadhu	Deva	Hariharan
2000	Karuvelam Pookkal	Ei Poothathadi Saathi Malli Poovu	Ilaiyaraaja	
2005	Sivakasi	Edhu Enna	Srikanth Deva	Harish Raghavendra
2005	Thirupaachi	Kannum Kannumthan Kalanthachu	Mani Sharma	Harish Raghavendra & Premji Amaren
