= S. S. Chandran =

Indian actor, film producer and politician (1940/41–2010)

- Born: 1940 or 1941
- Died: 8 October 2010 (aged 69); Chennai, India
- Occupations: Actor; Film producer; Politician
- Years active: 1966; 1980–2010
- Spouse: Rajam
- Children: 3

S. S. Chandran (1940/1941 – 8 October 2010) was an Indian comedian, actor, film producer and politician from Tamil Nadu. He belonged to the All India Anna Dravida Munnetra Kazhagam party and was a member of the parliament representing Tamil Nadu in the Rajya Sabha, the upper house of the Indian Parliament.

== Personal life ==
Chandran's son, Rohit, has acted in one film, Oru Murai Sollividu (2004).

== Film career ==
Chandran acted in over 700 films, having started performing at the age of 15. He made his acting debut with Kadhal Paduthum Paadu and gained his break with Sivappu Malli. He first acted in dramas which were staged in and around Tamil Nadu and later in Sri Lanka. Among his more popular films are: Sahadevan Mahadevan, Thangamani Rangamani, Paati Sollai Thattathey, and Kathanayagan. Chandran has also produced four films.

== Partial filmography ==
Actor

List of S. S. Chandran film actings credits
Year	Title	Role	Notes
1966	Kadhal Paduthum Paadu		Uncredited role
1980	Samanthipoo		
1980	Chinnajiru Kiliye		
1981	Aani Ver		
1981	Arthangal Aayiram		
1983	Saranalayam		
1983	Adutha Varisu		
1984	Vetri		
1984	Thanga Koppai	Pandu	
1984	Nandri	Punniyakodi	
1984	Vai Pandal		
1985	Unakkaga Oru Roja		
1985	Aagaya Thamaraigal		
1985	Avan		
1986	Karimedu Karuvayan		
1986	Jothi Malar		
1987	Poo Mazhai Pozhiyuthu		
1987	Cooliekkaran	Venkatachalam	
1987	Uzhavan Magan	Accountant	
1988	Makkal Aanaiyittal	Soku	
1988	Therkathi Kallan	Film director	
1988	Ganam Courtar Avargale	Desikachari	
1988	Katha Nayagan		
1988	Paatti Sollai Thattathe		
1988	Nallavan	Point	
1988	Uzhaithu Vaazha Vendum	Peter	
1989	Manmadha Rajakkal		
1989	Thooku Medhai		
1989	Thangaikkor Geetham		
1989	Purushan Enakku Arasan		
1989	Vaai Kozhuppu		
1989	Sahadevan Mahadevan	Politician Adiyapatham	
1989	Kan Simittum Neram	Pirambaram	
1989	Yogam Raja Yogam		
1989	Paandi Nattu Thangam		
1989	Yaamirukka Bhayamen		
1989	Aadhi Viratham		
1989	Chinnappadass		
1989	Oorai Therinjikitten		
1989	Paattukku Oru Thalaivan	Singaram	
1989	Poruthathu Pothum	Devadas	
1989	Raja Chinna Roja	Servant	
1989	Vetri Vizha	Cameo	
1989	Mappillai		
1990	Jagathalaprathapan		
1990	Pattanamthan Pogalamadi		
1990	Sathan Sollai Thattathe	Auction Businessman	
1990	En Veedu En Kanavar		
1990	Periya Veetu Pannakkaran		
1990	My Dear Marthandan		
1990	Maruthu Pandi		
1990	Sathya Vaakku		
1991	Thambikku Oru Pattu		
1993	Uzhaippali		
1993	Thiruda Thiruda		
1993	Dhool Parakuthu		
1993	Rajadhi Raja Raja Kulothunga Raja Marthanda Raja Gambeera Kathavaraya Krishna Kamarajan		
1993	En Idhaya Rani		
1993	Karpagam Vanthachu	Mayilsamy	
1993	Senthoorapandi	Sundaralingam	
1994	Killadi Mappillai		
1994	Oru Vasandha Geetham		
1994	Ilaignar Ani	Kaliappan	
1994	Amaidhi Padai		
1994	Hero		
1994	Veettai Paaru Naattai Paaru		
1994	Watchman Vadivel		
1994	Anbumagan		
1994	Vandicholai Chinnarasu		
1994	Mettupatti Mirasu	Karmegam	
1994	Pavithra	Neighbor of Raghunathan	
1994	Pattukottai Periyappa		
1994	Namma Annachi		
1994	Thamarai	Poosari	
1994	Thaatboot Thanjavoor		
1994	Sevatha Ponnu		
1994	Chinna Muthu		
1994	Vaanga Partner Vaanga		
1994	Pudhiya Mannargal		
1995	Karuppu Nila	P.K.R	
1995	Puthiya Aatchi	Kannusamy	
1995	Chinna Mani		
1995	Kalyanam		
1995	Vishnu	Varadrajan	
1995	Padikira Vayasula		
1995	Seethanam	Varadarajan	
1996	Thirumbi Paar	Kanakku	
1996	Puthiya Parasakthi	S.S	
1995	Vaazhga Jananayagam		
1997	Nalla Manasukkaran		
1997	Once More		
1998	Kavalai Padathe Sagodhara		
1998	Naam Iruvar Namakku Iruvar		
1998	Pudhumai Pithan		
1998	Vaettiya Madichu Kattu		
1999	Mannavaru Chinnavaru		
1999	Manam Virumbuthe Unnai	Kaasi	
1999	Periyanna		
1999	Unakkaga Ellam Unakkaga		
2000	Kadhal Rojavae		
2000	Thirunelveli		
2000	Kakkai Siraginilae		
2001	Ninaikkatha Naalillai		
2001	Seerivarum Kaalai		
2002	Kadhal Azhivathillai	Deputy PM's PA	
2003	Chokka Thangam		
2004	Oru Murai Sollividu		
2006	Kasu	Rathnam	

Producer & Director

List of S. S. Chandran film actings credits
Year	Title	Producer	Director	Notes
1985	Engal Kural	Yes	No	
1992	Purushan Enakku Arasan	Yes	No	
1996	Pombala Siricha Pochu	Yes	Yes	

Dubbing artist

List of S. S. Chandran film actings credits
Year	Title	Actor	Notes
1997	Devaraagam	Janardhanan	
2000	Shanmuga Pandian	A. V. S.	

== Death ==
Chandran had a heart attack and died on 8 October 2010.
