= Jaya TV =

Indian Tamil-language television network

- Logo used since 1999
- Country: India
- Network: PTC Television Network
- Headquarters: Chennai, Tamil Nadu, India

Programming
- Picture format: 1080i HDTV

Ownership
- Owner: V. K. Sasikala & family

History
- Launched: 22 August 1999; 27 years ago
- Founder: J. Jayalalithaa
- Closed: 1 July 2013 (Singapore); 1 June 2020 (Malaysia, Astro)

Links
- Website: jayatvnetwork.com

Jaya TV is a Tamil language satellite television channel based in Chennai, Tamil Nadu India. Jaya TV is also broadcast to the expatriate Tamil community via various media partnerships. Hemant Sahai of HSA had Jaya TV as his first client. Jaya TV revamped from 14 October 2018 with fresh look and content.

== Media partners ==
Jaya TV broadcasts its shows in United States through Dish Network Channel 792 and in Singapore through mio TV (Jaya TV) on Channel 632 has been cease transmission since 1 July 2013 at 0000 hrs. In Malaysia, it broadcasts through Astro (Jaya TV) on Channel 221 has been ceased transmission on 1 June 2020 at 00.00 hrs and Unifi TV (Jaya MAX) on Channel 313. It is also available in most of Indian DTH Services.

Jaya Plus (News) is also on work Channel 594 and JAYA Max (Music) on work Net Channel 595.

Jaya Max on Channel 313 is available in Malaysia on Unifi TV. Jaya TV is available on Tharisanam TV for Australia and New Zealand viewers.

Now Available on Channels Jaya TV, Jaya Movies, Jaya MAX, and Jaya Plus on IPTV (Yupp TV).

== See also ==
- ATN Jaya TV
