= Anusandhan (2021 film) =

Indian Bengali psychological thriller film

- Official poster
- Directed by: Kamaleshwar Mukherjee
- Written by: Kamaleshwar Mukherjee
- Produced by: Ashok Dhanuka; Himanshu Dhanuka
- Starring: Saswata Chatterjee; Payel Sarkar; Churni Ganguly; Joydip Mukherjee; Riddhi Sen
- Cinematography: Tuban
- Edited by: Rabiranjan Maitra
- Music by: Debasish Shome
- Production company: Big Screen Productions
- Distributed by: Eskay Movies
- Release date: 3 December 2021
- Country: India
- Language: Bengali

Anusandhan (transl. The Search) is a 2021 Indian Bengali-language psychological thriller film directed by Kamaleshwar Mukherjee produced by Big Screen Productions. Starring Saswata Chatterjee, Churni Ganguly and Joydeep Mukherjee, the film is an adaptation of a play directed by Kamaleswar himself. The movie is an adaptation of the 1956 novel A Dangerous Game by Friedrich Dürrenmatt which has earlier been adapted in Marathi as Shantata! Court Chalu Aahe (1971), in Kannada as Male Nilluvavarege (2015) and in Hindi as Chehre (2021). The film was released theatrically on 3 December 2021.

== Cast ==
- Saswata Chatterjee as Indra
- Payel Sarkar as Papiya
- Churni Ganguly as Judge
- Joydip Mukherjee
- Riddhi Sen as prosecutor
- Priyanka Sarkar as lawyer
- Kamaleswar Mukherjee as Indra’s ex-boss
- Joy Bhowmik as Aritra Mukherjee
- Dipanshu Kant
- Seher Bhowmik

== Production ==
The production crew and cast of the film flew to London on 13 September 2020 for London schedule of filming. The filming post COVID-19 pandemic resumed in various locations around London on 16 September 2020. The schedule was wrapped up in September end.

== Soundtrack ==
Soundtrack is composed by Anupam Roy on his own lyrics. The single track was released on 20 November 2021.

Track listing
No.	Title	Singer(s)	Length
1.	"Anek Durer Manush"	Anupam Roy	4:22
Total length:			4:22
