= Assignment =

Assignment, assign or The Assignment may refer to:

- Homework
- Sex assignment
- The process of sending National Basketball Association players to its development league; see NBA G League § Assignment

== Computing ==
- Assignment (computer science), a type of modification to a variable
- Drive letter assignment, the process of assigning alphabetical identifiers to disk drives or partitions
- ASSIGN (DOS command)

== Mathematics ==
- Assignment problem, a type of math problem
- Assignment (mathematical logic)

== Financial and legal ==
- Assignment (housing law), a concept that allows the transfer of a tenancy from one person to another
- Assignment (law), a transfer of rights between two parties
- Along with clearing, a stage in exercising a financial option
- General assignment or Assignment for the Benefit of Creditors, an alternative to bankruptcy for businesses that's available in British common law and some US states

== Entertainment ==
- The Assignment (novella), by Friedrich Dürrenmatt
- The Assignment, a 2016 book by Sophie Labelle
- The Assignment (1977 film), a Swedish drama film
- The Assignment (1997 film), a spy action thriller film
- Assignment (film), a 2015 South African political thriller
- The Assignment (2016 film), an action crime thriller film
- "The Assignment" (Star Trek: Deep Space Nine)
- Assignment (TV program), a late night news magazine program
- The Assignment, a podcast by Audie Cornish
