= Chehre =

2021 Indian film by Rumi Jaffery

- Theatrical release poster
- Directed by: Rumi Jaffery
- Written by: Ranjit Kapoor; Rumi Jaffery
- Story by: Ranjit Kapoor
- Based on: A Dangerous Game by Friedrich Dürrenmatt
- Produced by: Anand Pandit; Vaishal Shah (Co-producer)
- Starring: Amitabh Bachchan; Emraan Hashmi; Krystle D'Souza; Siddhanth Kapoor; Annu Kapoor; Alexx O'Nell; Samir Soni; Raghubir Yadav; Dhritiman Chatterjee; Rhea Chakraborty
- Cinematography: Binod Pradhan
- Edited by: Bodhaditya Banerjee
- Music by: Score: Clinton Cerejo; Songs: Vishal–Shekhar; Gourov Dasgupta
- Production companies: Anand Pandit Motion Pictures; Saraswati Entertainment Private Limited
- Distributed by: Pen Marudhar Entertainment
- Release date: 27 August 2021
- Running time: 139 minutes
- Country: India
- Language: Hindi
- Budget: ₹25 crore
- Box office: ₹8.26 crore

Chehre (transl. Faces) is a 2021 Indian Hindi-language mystery thriller film directed and co-written by Rumi Jaffery and produced by Anand Pandit with Saraswati Entertainment Private Limited. The film stars Amitabh Bachchan and Emraan Hashmi in lead roles, alongside Krystle D'Souza, Rhea Chakraborty, Siddhanth Kapoor, Annu Kapoor, Alexx O'Nell, Samir Soni, Dhritiman Chatterjee and Raghubir Yadav in supporting roles. It is an uncredited adaptation of the 1956 German novel A Dangerous Game by Friedrich Dürrenmatt, which had earlier been adapted in Marathi as Shantata! Court Chaalu Aahe (1971), in Kannada as Male Nilluvavarege (2015) and in Bengali as Anusandhan (2021).

The film was announced on 11 April 2019 and filming began on 10 May 2019. It was scheduled for a theatrical release on 17 July 2020, but was delayed due to the COVID-19 pandemic. The film was released in theatres on 27 August 2021. Upon release, the film was a box office disaster, grossing only ₹8 crore against its ₹25 crore budget.

== Plot ==
Sameer Mehra (Emraan Hashmi), a business tycoon takes shelter at an old man's home in the mountains amidst a dangerous snowstorm. He is introduced to Jagdish Acharya (Dhritiman Chatterjee), a retired judge, Paramjeet Singh Bhullar (Annu Kapoor), a renowned defence counsel, Anna Matthews (Rhea Chakraborty), a house help, and one Hariya Jadhav (Raghubir Yadav). They are later joined by Lateef Zaidi (Amitabh Bachchan), a renowned public prosecutor who has a sharp wit and an eye for detail.

Lateef initiates a conversation with Sameer to check if he is the right subject for a practical game they play amongst themselves. Sameer introduces himself as a successful and ambitious executive of an ad agency who achieved everything on his own since he was orphaned at the age of 15. When Sameer takes a break, Lateef remarks to his friends that he is absolutely sure that Sameer is the right subject for their game, and as everyone values his opinion, they agree to this.

Everyone coerces Sameer to play the game, and he agrees. Later, Joe Matthews (Siddhanth Kapoor), an ex-convict accused of murder, joins them. Jagdish tells Sameer that he had pronounced judgement in Joe's case as he was caught killing the person who sexually assaulted his sister, and now that he has served his sentence, they are all on good terms with him.

The game is basically a mock trial wherein they set up a court and argue about some famous cases. Sameer agrees to be their defendant as Anna has not prepared for a famous case Lateef had earlier asked her for. Jagdish tells Sameer his rights and tells him that he can meet his defence counsel, Bhullar, to discuss his case before the court starts. When they both meet in private, Sameer tells Bhullar that he has committed no crime so his case won't stand in court, but Bhullar opposes this, saying that going without any criminal charge in the mock court is dangerous since the prosecutor would then have complete freedom to charge him with anything. Sameer rejects this idea and says that he would go without any charge.

As the court starts, Lateef is able to extract intimate details of Sameer's professional life, to which Sameer naively answers all questions honestly in the beginning, but Lateef is able to correctly point out that he had an affair with his boss's wife. On further inquisition, he concludes that Sameer colluded with his boss' wife to kill him and later advance to the position of the CEO. At this point, the mock trial becomes real and the judge notifies that charges are to be framed and the trial starts. He then gives time to the defence to prepare for the trial.

During this break, Sameer learns that Hariya is a retired hangman and Joe is, in fact, Anna's brother. Scared, he tries to escape from the house, but Joe prevents that from happening. Sameer now realises he is completely trapped. As the trial starts, Lateef presents a video from Sameer's phone as evidence of his illicit relationship with Natasha (Krystle D'Souza), his late boss G.S. Oswal (Samir Soni)'s wife, and their conspiracy to kill him. Bhullar and Lateef passionately argue in the court & finally a guilty verdict is pronounced & given capital punishment. Now everyone insists Sameer to go upstairs with Hariya, presumably to be hanged to his death. Sameer mocks them saying that they are real criminals who hang people for their petty game. Lateef replies that the entire trial has been recorded by CCTV, and that either way, he would be punished in this court or a real court. Fearing dear life, Sameer pulls out a gun & threatens everyone at gunpoint, takes the DVR of the CCTV and runs out of the house with everyone else in pursuit. Sameer manages to destroy the DVR, but in a hasty move, accidentally falls off the cliff to his death, thus serving poetic justice to his crime.

A few days later, Natasha visits their place, telling them that she is here to collect Sameer's phone which is her company's property. The film ends with everyone convincing Natasha to play their game.

== Cast ==
- Amitabh Bachchan as Adv. Lateef Zaidi, a renowned public prosecutor
- Emraan Hashmi as Sameer Mehra, a business tycoon
- Annu Kapoor as Adv. Paramjeet Singh Bhullar, a retired defence counsel
- Dhritiman Chatterjee as Justice (Retd.) Jagdish Acharya
- Raghubir Yadav as Hariya Jadhav, a retired hangman
- Krystle D'Souza as Natasha Oswal, Sameer's love interest and later partner
- Samir Soni as G. S. Oswal, Natasha's husband
- Rhea Chakraborty as Anna Mathews
- Siddhanth Kapoor as Joe Costa, an ex-convict accused of murder who is actually Anna's brother
- Alexx O'Nell as Richard Alexander

== Production ==
Filming began on 10 May 2019. First schedule ended on 16 June with a fourteen minute long shot by Bachchan in one go. Kriti Kharbanda was initially selected to star in the film but left due to a fallout with the makers. She was replaced by Krystle D'Souza.

== Soundtrack ==
Chehre

Soundtrack album by Vishal–Shekhar and Gourov Dasgupta
- Released: 24 August 2021
- Recorded: 2020
- Genre: Feature film soundtrack
- Length: 16:03
- Language: Hindi
- Label: Zee Music Company

Official audio
- Chehre - Full Album on YouTube

The music of film was composed by Vishal–Shekhar and Gourov Dasgupta while lyrics written by Farhan Memon and Rumy Jafry.

Track listing
No.	Title	Lyrics	Music	Singer(s)	Length
1.	"Rang Dariya"	Farhan Memon	Gourov Dasgupta	Yasser Desai	4:56
2.	"Chehre - Title Track"	Rumy Jafry	Vishal–Shekhar	Amitabh Bachchan	3:07
3.	"Rang Dariya" (Reprise)	Farhan Memon	Gourov Dasgupta	Raj Barman	4:57
4.	"Chehre - Title Track" (Reprise)	Rumy Jafry	Vishal–Shekhar	Shekhar Ravjiani	3:03
Total length:					16:03

== Reception ==
On the review aggregator website Rotten Tomatoes, 0% of 11 critics' reviews are positive, with an average rating of 2.8/10.

Taran Adarsh of Bollywood Hungama gave the film 3.5 stars out of 5 calling Chehre "Engrossing" and wrote, "Captivating screenplay + wonderful performances by the principal cast makes chehre an interesting watch." Shubhra Gupta of The Indian Express gave the film 1.5 stars out of 5 saying that, "the film stodgy plot spoils the cast performance."

Renuka Vyavahare of The Times of India gave 2.5 (out of 5) stars and said, "Chehre aims to make a social commentary on the state of criminal justice in India. The idea at the outset is interesting, but it stops at just that."

Archita Kashyap of Firstpost gave the film 2.5 out of 5 stars and wrote, "Chehre aims to cock a snook at the present-day fast-paced chasing of ambitions, money, and success but becomes too preachy at times."
