= A Dangerous Game (novel) =

1956 novel by Friedrich Dürrenmatt

- First UK edition (publ. Jonathan Cape)
- Author: Friedrich Dürrenmatt
- Original title: Die Panne
- Translator: Richard Winston; Clara Winston
- Language: German
- Published: 1956 (Verlag der Arche/German); 1960 (English)
- Publication place: Switzerland
- Pages: 125

A Dangerous Game is a 1956 novel by the Swiss writer Friedrich Dürrenmatt. Its original German title is Die Panne, which means "The breakdown". It is known as Traps in the United States. It tells the story of a traveller who, when his car breaks down, is invited for dinner by a former judge, after which nightmarish developments follow. The work was initially written as a radio play, but was adapted into prose almost immediately. It won the 1956 Blind War Veterans’ Prize for best radio play and the literary award of the newspaper Tribune de Lausanne.

== Plot ==
Alfredo Traps, a sales representative, whose car breaks down during a trip in the provinces, finds lodging for the night in a house of a retired judge. The host invites Traps to participate in a game that the judge and his three friends—a former prosecutor, defense attorney and public hangman—play over dinner. The game in question is a pretend trial in which Traps will be the defendant. During the cross-examination it transpires that he may have caused the death of his boss from a heart attack. He also carried on an affair with the boss’ wife. The prosecutor then charges Traps with premeditated murder. After heated closing arguments, the judge sentences Traps to death. The retired agents of justice then thank Traps for being a good sport, and ask the former executioner to escort the guest upstairs to his room. Later, when they deliver the written verdict to Traps’ room, they discover that he has hanged himself.

== Inspiration ==
In a 1960 interview with Jean-Paul Weber, Dürrenmatt said he was inspired by a short story by Maupassant but couldn't remember which one. Peter Spycher tried to identify the story and suggested that "Le Voleur" in the volume Mademoiselle Fifi might be the one Dürrenmatt had in mind. Armin Arnold also suggested that another source of inspiration was Edgar Wallace's novel The Four Just Men, published in 1905.

== Versions ==
The work was initially written as a radio play, but Dürrenmatt adapted it into prose almost immediately. The main difference between the two versions is the ending. In the radio-play version, Traps gets up in the morning, collects his repaired car and drives away completely unperturbed by the last night’s trial. In the prose version, he hangs himself after receiving his death sentence, leaving the old men dismayed that he has taken their game too far and ruined their perfect evening. In 1979, Dürrenmatt reworked the material again, this time for stage. In the end, Traps receives two verdicts: a "metaphysical" one of guilt and a "juristic" one of innocence. The judge lets him decide which one he prefers. Traps ends up shooting and hanging himself.

== Adaptations ==
=== Stage ===
- The Deadly Game (1960, American play by James Yaffe)
- Shantata! Court Chalu Aahe (Silence! The Court Is in Session) (1967, Marathi play by Vijay Tendulkar)
- A Spanner in the Works (stage adaptation by Julian Forsyth for the Greenwich Studio Theatre, 1994)

=== Film and TV ===
- Die Panne (1957, German TV film directed by Fritz Umgelter)
- Suspicion: The Deadly Game (1957, TV series episode directed by Don Medford)
- ITV Television Playhouse: Breakdown (1958, TV series episode directed by Alvin Rakoff)
- Shantata! Court Chalu Aahe (Silence! The Court Is in Session) (1971, Indian Marathi-language film adaptation of the 1967 play by Satyadev Dubey)
- The Most Wonderful Evening of My Life (1972, Italian film directed by Ettore Scola)
- Avariya (The Breakdown) (1974, Soviet TV film directed by Vytautas Zalakevicius)
- The Deadly Game (1982, American-British TV film directed by George Schaefer based on James Yaffe's play)
- ليلة القتل الابيض (The Night of White Murder) (1999, Egyptian mini-series directed by Hani Ismail)
- Male Nilluvavarege (2015, Indian Kannada-language film directed by Mohan Shankar)
- Wrong Turn (2019, Indian Hindi-language TV film directed by Ishan Trivedi)
- Chehre (2021, Indian Hindi-language film directed by Rumi Jaffery)
- Anusandhan (2021, Indian Bengali-language film directed by Kamaleshwar Mukherjee)

== See also ==
- 1956 in literature
- Swiss literature
