= Janani (2010 film) =

- DVD cover
- Directed by: C. Rajkumar
- Written by: Mohan Shankar (dialogue)
- Screenplay by: Mohan Shankar; C. Rajkumar
- Story by: C. Rajkumar
- Produced by: B. N. Gangadhar
- Starring: Shiva; Vibha Rai; Jayasudha
- Cinematography: P K H Das
- Edited by: S Manohar
- Music by: Asif Ali
- Production company: A K Cine Creations
- Release date: 5 March 2010
- Country: India
- Language: Kannada

Janani is a 2010 Indian Kannada-language drama film directed by C. Rajkumar and starring Shiva, Vibha Rai and Jayasudha.

== Cast ==
- Shiva
- Vibha Rai as Janani
- Jayasudha
- Khushbu
- Prakash Raj
- Satyajith
- Sanketh Kashi
- Mandeep Roy

== Production ==
This film began production in 2002 and marks the debut of Khushbu's brother Shiva (Abdullah Khan) and the director C. Rajkumar, who previously produced films like Sangrama (1987), Yuddha Kaanda (1989) and Abhijith (1993). Minal Patil, who made her debut with Paris Pranaya (2003), was supposed to make her debut with this film but was replaced by Vibha Rai. Jayasudha returned to Kannada cinema after many ten years She was last seen in Nee Thanda Kanike (1985).

T. N. Varkey, who wanted to produce the film sent Khushbu ₹7.8 lakh (US$8,200) and she agreed to sell him her flat. Khushbu appeared in court after Varkey did not receive the flat because Shiva was using the flat as collateral security.

== Soundtrack ==
The music was composed by Asif Ali. The songs were released under the banner of Lahari Music. The audio launch was held on 30 January 2010.

Song	Singer(s)	Lyrics
"Dil Dil"	Vasundara Das	Mohan Shankar
"Nannasege Usiru"	Rajesh Krishnan, K S Surekha	Mohan Shankar
"Suvvali Suvvalaali"	P. Unnikrishnan, Bombay Jayashri	K. Kalyan
"Chandulli Bombe Naanu"	Malgudi Subha	K. Kalyan
"Prithiye Nanage"	Rajesh Krishnan, K. S. Surekha	K Kalyan

== Release and reception ==
The film was delayed for seven years due to lack of funds before it was released in 2010.

A critic from Bangalore Mirror wrote that "If you catch this film on TV, you will be forgiven for deciding that Janani is from a remote part of the 20th Century".
