= Ellara Mane Dosenu =

- VCD cover
- Directed by: H. S. Prakash
- Written by: Mohan Shankar (dialogue)
- Story by: V. Sekhar
- Based on: Kaalam Maari Pochu (Tamil)(1996) by V. Sekhar
- Produced by: B. G. Hemalatha
- Starring: Ramkumar; Shruti; Mohan Shankar; Bhavana; Sanketh Kashi; Umashree
- Cinematography: Prasad Babu
- Edited by: S. Manohar
- Music by: Hamsalekha
- Production company: S D M Films
- Release date: 30 March 2001
- Country: India
- Language: Kannada

Ellara Mane Dosenu (transl. Everyone's house dose has...) is a 2001 Indian Kannada-language family drama film directed by H. S. Prakash and starring Ramkumar, Shruti, Mohan Shankar, Bhavana, Sanketh Kashi and Umashree. The film is a remake of the Tamil film Kaalam Maari Pochu (1996) and was released to negative reviews. The story revolves around three sisters - Ramani, Mandara and Vasantha - who are forced by their father to marry against their will which culminates with the beginning of their tryst with the evils of a male-dominated society.

== Cast ==
- Ramkumar as Muthu Raj
- Shruti as Vasantha
- Mohan Shankar
- Bhavana as Mandhara
- Sanketh Kashi
- Umashree as Ramani
- Srinivasa Murthy as Palanamayya a.k.a. Palanthu
- Jayanthi as Savitri
- Suhasini Maniratnam as Media reporter
- Darshan as Sharath
- Bank Janardhan
- Honnavalli Krishna
- Bangalore Nagesh
- M. S. Karanth

== Production ==
The film's title is based on a popular saying. Bhavana plays the middle class wife of an unemployed man.

== Soundtrack ==
The music was composed by Hamsalekha.

Track listing
No.	Title	Singer(s)	Length
1.	"Reelo Riyallo"	Nanditha	4:42
2.	"Kaasu Keluva Ganda Meese Yaatako"	Hemanth, Nanditha	4:15
3.	"Vayyari Vayyari"	Hemanth, Ramesh Chandra	5:20
4.	"Udhyogam Udhyogam"	Harishchandra, Hemanth, Nandhita, Ramesh	4:57
5.	"Bumper Bumper Lottery"	Latha Hamsalekha, Nandhita, Sangeetha Kat	4:46
Total length:			24:00

== Reception ==
A critic from Chitraloka.com wrote that "Firstly he has failed miserably in putting the spicy Dosa correctly on the pan and while serving it to the customers (audience in this case) he has forgot to give the well prepared".
