= End of the Game =

1975 film by Maximilian Schell

- Directed by: Maximilian Schell
- Screenplay by: Maximilian Schell; Roberto de Leonardis
- Based on: The Judge and His Hangman; 1950 novella by Friedrich Durrenmatt
- Produced by: Maximilian Schell; Arlene Sellers
- Starring: Jon Voight; Jacqueline Bisset; Martin Ritt; Robert Shaw
- Cinematography: Roberto Gerardi; Ennio Guarnieri; Klaus König
- Edited by: Dagmar Hirtz
- Music by: Ennio Morricone
- Production companies: MFG-Film; T.R.A.C.
- Distributed by: Constantin Film; 20th Century Fox
- Release dates: September 1975 (Spain); May 12, 1976 (United States)
- Running time: 106 minutes
- Countries: West Germany; Italy
- Language: English

End of the Game (German: Der Richter und sein Henker) is a 1975 DeLuxe Color German mystery thriller film directed by Maximilian Schell, and starring Jon Voight, Jacqueline Bisset, Martin Ritt and Robert Shaw. Co-written by Friedrich Dürrenmatt, the film is an adaptation of his 1950 crime novella The Judge and His Hangman (German: Der Richter und sein Henker). Dürrenmatt also appears in the film, while Donald Sutherland plays the role of the corpse of Schmied.

== Plot summary ==
In 1948 Istanbul, a young Hans Bärlach accepts a bet from his associate Richard Gastmann that Gastmann can commit a crime in front of him Bärlach cannot prove. Shortly after, he witnesses the woman he loves (Rita Calderoni) fall from a bridge into the bay. Convinced Gastmann had pushed her but indeed unable to prove it, Bärlach leaps into the water too late to save her as Gastmann disappears.

Thirty years later, Bärlach (Martin Ritt) has become a Swiss police commissioner and is facing death in less than a year from stomach cancer, for which an uncertain operation is planned. In the countryside his assistant Lt. Robert Schmied (Donald Sutherland) is found shot dead in his car by the side of the road and Bärlach takes pains to remove a red folder from Schmied's files.

The case is assigned to the young, aggressive detective Walter Tschanz (Jon Voight); Tschanz appears well-informed about the case, but is stymied by Commissioner Bärlach's revelation that two bullets were found at the scene, unaware that the Commissioner himself had planted the second one. After a disastrous funeral for the late Lieutenant, Tschanz strikes up a stormy romance with Schmied's girlfriend Anna (Jacqueline Bisset). He finds a cryptic letter G regularly occurs in Schmied's datebook, leading him to Gastmann (Robert Shaw), who has become a wealthy industrialist with an expansive remote estate.

Spying on Gastmann's dinner party from a window, Tschanz is shocked to see Anna in attendance. The stakeout is exposed when the Commissioner, who had accompanied him, is attacked by Gastmann's watchdog and Tschanz is forced to kill it. After harsh words with Gastmann's attorney von Schwedi (Helmut Qualtinger), Tschanz hears screaming from an upstairs window and, peering in again, is greeted by Gastmann himself and a disembodied woman's head. During the incident, the dog's body disappears. Gastmann's bodyguards force Tschanz off the property and he drives the Commissioner home, who quietly puts away a pistol and a leather bite guard from his arm that the dog had supposedly mauled. Von Schwedi makes a formal complaint the next day to Lutz (Gabriele Ferzetti), the chief of police, and alleges that Schmied's undercover attendance at Gastmann's parties was a spy attempt by a foreign power. As if in confirmation, the Minister of Justice instructs Lutz to stop the investigation of Gastmann, citing his importance to the national economy.

Tschanz is frustrated by the dead end and perplexed by the behaviour of the Commissioner, who lives in an unkempt apartment and whose illness appears to be worsening. On Bärlach's suggestion he speaks with writer Friedrich (original author Friedrich Dürrenmatt, in a cameo), who reveals Gastmann and Bärlach's fateful bet and that the Commissioner had pursued Gastmann for his numerous crimes since Istanbul. Unbeknownst to Tschanz, the Commissioner returns to Gastmann's estate and Anna, there as a long-term guest, explains her history with Gastmann and that her dalliance with Schmied was only in the hopes he would rescue her. Gastmann later visits Bärlach's apartment and taunts the Commissioner for sending Schmied to observe him, claiming he will commit yet another crime the Commissioner can't prove and takes Schmied's red folder as he departs.

At the airport, the crime is revealed as the ineffective von Schwedi's murder, whose bloodied corpse falls from the baggage carousel. Tschanz confronts Anna over her association with Gastmann, who lets slip that the Commissioner had been at Gastmann's; an unknown assailant then tries to murder the Commissioner in his apartment that evening. Tschanz asserts Gastmann is responsible for the attack and for Schmied's murder and therefore must be brought to justice, but the Commissioner demurs. Gastmann kills the Commissioner's driver and hijacks his car to have him killed as well, but is intrigued when Bärlach says if he cannot make him pay for the crimes he has committed, he will make him pay for one he hasn't. Gastmann instead drives Bärlach to the train station and the Commissioner warns Gastmann that he has "sentenced" him.

As Bärlach promised, the next day Tschanz shoots Gastmann and his bodyguards and places the gun used to kill Schmied in one of the guards' hands. Tschanz is startled to find Bärlach already aware of Gastmann's death and celebrating with rich food and ample wine in apparent exceptional health. He gives Tschanz a gift: the bullet Tschanz used to kill the watchdog, the corpse of which the Commissioner had quietly removed, which matches the gun used to kill Schmied. The Commissioner explains he knew that Tschanz murdered Schmied because he was jealous of his success on the job and with Anna, and to extract Bärlach's revenge on Tschanz, manipulated him into framing and murdering Gastmann. With Gastmann dead, Tschanz, the unknown assailant, now has no one to frame for another attack on Bärlach and departs in disgrace with Anna. He tells her he did it for her and after abandoning her by the side of the road, drives off a bridge.

The Commissioner decides not to have surgery, as the anaesthetist had been hired by Gastmann to kill him, and thus robs Gastmann of his last, posthumous crime. In the epilogue, he reasons to Anna he will still have a year to live regardless.

== Cast ==
- Jon Voight as Herr Walter Tschanz
- Jacqueline Bisset as Frau Anna Crawley
- Martin Ritt as Kommisar Hans Bärlach
- Robert Shaw as Herr Richard Gastmann
- Helmut Qualtinger as Herr von Schwedi
- Gabriele Ferzetti as Doctor Lucius Lutz
- Rita Calderoni as Nadine
- Norbert Schiller as Dr. Hungertobel
- Lil Dagover as Gastmann's mother
- Friedrich Dürrenmatt as Friedrich the writer
- Donald Sutherland as Corpse of Lt. Robert Schmied

== Soundtrack ==
Most of Ennio Morricone's original compositions for this film were replaced for the international film version, using music the composer had written for older projects. Only five tracks of Morricone's score had been later released on a vinyl album. In 2010 the Italian record company Beat Records released the score as originally composed by Morricone as a limited CD edition containing 31 tracks with a total time of 76:20 minutes.

== Release ==
The original 106-minute film version has not been released on the home video market. For unknown reasons, in 2011 only a much shorter 91-minute international version has been restored and released on a German Blu-ray edition.

== Reception ==
The film won two awards at the German Film Awards: For Best Editing (Dagmar Hirtz), and Outstanding Feature Film. Maximilian Schell was also nominated for Best Direction and won the Silver Seashell at the San Sebastián International Film Festival.

In The New York Times, film critic Richard Eder wrote:

End of the Game is a metaphysical cuckoo clock of a movie, full of talent and fog. But the mechanism is deranged. Instead of every hour or half-hour, the cuckoo pops out every minute and a half. It jangles us. There's too much writing, too much acting, too many symbols, too much paradox, too many significant camera angles. The author thinks of lots of clever ways to do each scene; instead of choosing he does them all.
