= Sachin Tendulkar Alla =

- Directed by: Mohan Shankar
- Produced by: BN Gangadhar
- Starring: Master Snehith; Javagal Srinath; Venkatesh Prasad; Suhasini Maniratnam; Sudharani
- Narrated by: Suhasini Manirathnam
- Cinematography: D. Prasad Babu
- Edited by: Shivaprasad Yadav
- Music by: Rajesh Ramanath
- Distributed by: B. N. S. Productions
- Release date: 11 July 2014
- Running time: 2 hours 10 minutes
- Country: India
- Language: Kannada

Sachin Tendulkar Alla (transl. Not Sachin Tendulkar) is a 2014 Indian Kannada film directed by Mohan Shankar and featuring Master Snehith as the autistic boy who struggles to make it big in cricket. Cricketer Venkatesh Prasad, Suhasini Maniratnam and Sudharani co-star in the film, which has music composed by Rajesh Ramanath.

The film was dubbed and released in Telugu as Sachin Tendulkar Kaadhu in 2015.

== Cast ==
- Master Snehith as Sachin
- Javagal Srinath
- Venkatesh Prasad as Dinesh, cricket coach
- Suhasini Maniratnam as Sachin's elder sister
- Sudharani
- Padma Vasanthi
- Shailaja Joshi
- Arun Devashya
- Srinivas Prabhu

== Soundtrack ==
The soundtrack of the film was composed by Rajesh Ramanath.

Track listing
No.	Title	Lyrics	Singer(s)	Length
1.	"Kanne Hoda Mele"	Vidya Mohan	Vidya Mohan	5:22
2.	"Naguvalle"	Naveen	Anuradha Bhat	4:24
3.	"Suttho Bhumi Ane"	V. Nagendra Prasad	Jaggesh, Rajesh Ramnath	4:58
Total length:				14:44

== Reception ==
A critic from Bangalore Mirror wrote that "Sachin - Tendulkar Alla is a feel-good film that manages to overwhelm a few senses". A critic from Deccan Chronicle rated the film 3 1/2 out of 5 and called the film "a master stroke which deserves some sort of 'record".
