= The Deadly Game (1982 film) =

1982 American-British thriller film

- Genre: Thriller
- Based on: A Dangerous Game by Friedrich Dürrenmatt
- Written by: James Yaffe
- Directed by: George Schaefer
- Starring: George Segal; Trevor Howard; Robert Morley; Emlyn Williams; Alan Webb; Lesley Dunlop; Brian Croucher; Connie Booth
- Music by: Elizabeth Parker
- Countries of origin: United States; United Kingdom
- Original language: English

Production
- Producers: Hillard Elkins; Edie Landau; Ely A. Landau
- Running time: 112 minutes
- Production companies: BBC Drama Group; Primetime Television Ltd.

Original release
- Network: HBO
- Release: July 22, 1982

The Deadly Game is a 1982 American-British made-for-television thriller film that premiered on HBO. The intellectual thriller was directed by George Schaefer and adapted from a 1960 play by James Yaffe that was in turn based on the novel A Dangerous Game by Swiss author Friedrich Dürrenmatt. It stars George Segal as an American tourist traveling in the Swiss Alps who is lured into a dangerous mock trial by retired Swiss lawyers played by Trevor Howard, Robert Morley, and Emlyn Williams.

The film, which was made in London, received critical acclaim. It received the CableACE Award for best single program, along five additional nominations, including ones for the performances of Segal and Howard. The film also served as actor Alan Webb's final screen performance.

== Cast ==
- George Segal as Howard Trapp
- Trevor Howard as Gustave Kummer
- Robert Morley as Emile Carpeau
- Emlyn Williams as Bernard Laroque
- Alan Webb as Joseph Pillet
- Lesley Dunlop as Nicole
- Brian Croucher as Pierre
- Connie Booth as Helen Trapp
