= Srinivas Prabhu =

Indian actor

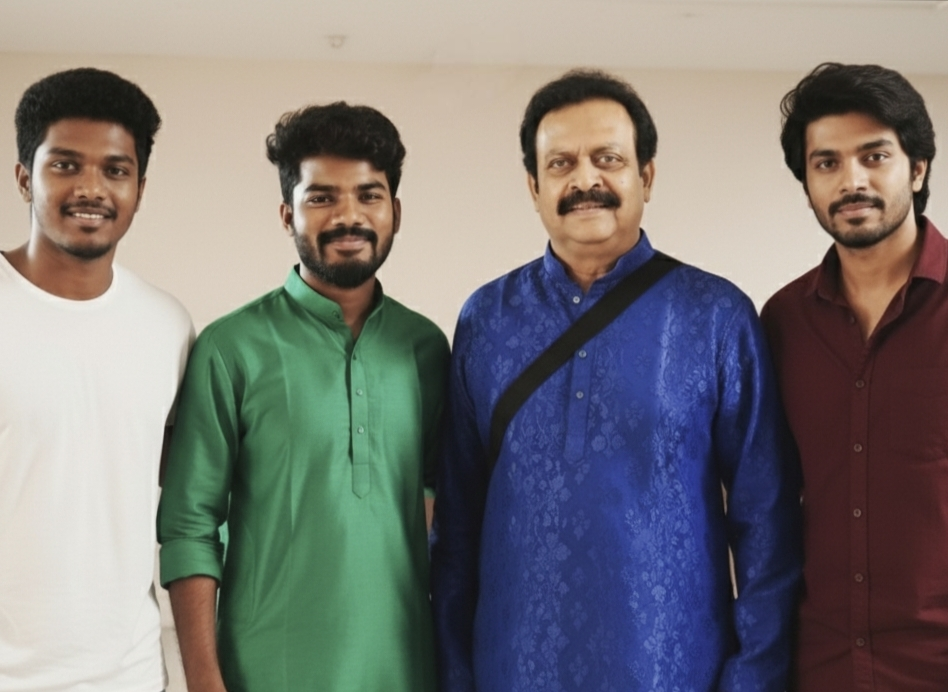
- Prabhu (in blue)
- Occupations: Film and theatre actor
- Years active: 1983–present

Srinivasa Prabhu is an Indian actor in the Kannada film industry and theatre. His roles include the one-man film Bimba - Those 90 Minutes, which he later performed as a play.

== Personal life ==
Srinivasa Prabhu did his MA from Central College in Bengaluru, securing the first rank (gold medal) in the state. He graduated from the prestigious National School of Drama, New Delhi, in 1981.

== Career ==
He worked as a voice-over dubbing artist for Ravichandran in most of his early blockbuster films such as Premaloka, Anjada Gandu and Ranadheera. He was part of many soap/serials including Janani, Aasare, Sanje Mallige, Muktha, Naaku Thanthi, Kutumba, Maneyondhu Mooru Bagilu, Gupthagamini, Kadambari, Geethanjali, Thakadhimi Thaa and Punyakoti etc. At one point in the 2000s, it was nearly impossible to switch on a Kannada Daily Soap channel and not spot Mr. Prabhu, which led to him being given the title of "Kirutereya Badshah" ("King of the Small Screen" / "King of Television") by popular media publications.

He is also a Hindustani singer, trained by the legendary's Shyamala Bhave. Srinivasa Prabhu has also written the lyrics for 13 songs in the play ′Gulle Nari′ (an adaptation of Benjamin Jonson's ′Volpone′). He has also authored two cook books in Kannada under the title "Siri Paaka".

== Selected filmography ==
- Adi Shankaracharya (1983)
- Accident (1985)
- Kanooru Heggadithi (1999)
- Mussanje (2001)
- Karmugilu (2002)
- Hubli (2006)
- Hudugaru (2011)
- Puttakkana Highway (2011)
- Prarthane (2012)
- Sachin Tendulkar Alla (2014)
- Mr. and Mrs. Ramachari (2014)
- Male Nilluvavarege (2015)
- Karvva (2016)
- Smile Please (2017)
- Humble Politician Nograj (2018)
- Hyper (2018)
- Bimba - Those 90 Minutes (2019; as co-director and co-producer)
- Shubhamangala (2022)
- The Devil (2025)

== Awards and recognition ==
- Karnataka Nataka Academy Award (2008)
- URF World Record (2019) for 'Bimba' as the first single-shot, single-actor feature film in the world
- India Book of Records National Record for 'Bimba' (2019)
- 'Natya Shiromani' National Award, Orissa
- 'Rangashree Sagar' award for excellence in theatre
- 'Aryabhata - Best Actor Award' for 'Kutumba' (Udaya TV)
- Sandalwood Seva Ratna Award (2022)
- 'Best Regional Film award at Rajasthan International Film Festival (2019) for 'Bimba'
- 'Best Dialogue' award for 'Bimba' by Raghavendra Chitravani Samsthe
- Kannada International Music Award (KiMA) for 'Best Lyrics' and 'Best Music' in Theatre for the play 'Gulle Nari' (2014)
