= The Tunnel (short story) =

Story by Friedrich Dürrenmatt

First edition, 1952

"The Tunnel" is a 1952 short story by Friedrich Dürrenmatt. It belongs to the most important works of Dürrenmatt and is a classic among the surrealistic short stories. With the beginning of the story, Dürrenmatt parodies Thomas Mann. The first sentence is very long and nested. Furthermore, Dürrenmatt's student is in a train and likes cigars – just like the young man in The Magic Mountain (Der Zauberberg).

== Synopsis ==
The story follows a 24-year-old student who boards his usual train to reach his university. However, when the train enters a small tunnel, it doesn't end. The darkness continues for an extended period of time, causing the student to become nervous. Despite the imminent danger, the other passengers remain calm. The student seeks out the train conductor for answers, but initially receives evasive responses. Eventually, the conductor leads the student to the empty locomotive and reveals that the engineer had already jumped when he realized what was happening to the train. After a failed attempt to pull the emergency brake, the train accelerates and tips into an abyss. The falling student lands on the front glass of the still falling locomotive, where he stares into the oncoming darkness. The train conductor asks what they should do, but the student responds with "Nothing (...) God let us fall. And now we'll come upon him." Dürrenmatt later abridged the ending, omitting the last two sentences and ending the story with the word "Nothing".

== Interpretation ==
The racing train could be interpreted as every life that inescapably approaches a catastrophe (death, the unknown). Terror can be breaking in a life without warning, and the people hide themselves behind banality. The last sentence of the story interprets this terror as the will of God, but that does not make the terror clearer.

Another interpretation is the story is a social commentary on the ignorance of society in the face of imminent disaster, as people place unquestioning trust in leaders without concern for where they are being led. The last sentence spoken by the student comments on the fall of the ultimate authority figure, God, and how placing trust in falsely constructed authority will only result in the downfall of society.

== Literature ==
- "Die schönsten Kurzgeschichten aus aller Welt", Band 2, Verlag Das Beste 1976, S.724-733
