= The Judge and His Hangman =

1950 novel by Friedrich Dürrenmatt

- First American edition (1955)
- Author: Friedrich Dürrenmatt
- Original title: Der Richter und sein Henker
- Language: German
- Genre: Detective fiction
- Publisher: Jonathan Cape (UK); Harper & Brothers (US)
- Publication date: 1950
- Publication place: Switzerland
- English publication date: 1954
- Media type: Print (hardcover)

The Judge and His Hangman (German: Der Richter und sein Henker) is a 1950 novel by the Swiss writer Friedrich Dürrenmatt. It was first published in English in 1954 in a translation by Cyrus Brooks, and later in a translation by Therese Pol. A new translation by Joel Agee appeared in 2006, published together with the book's sequel, Suspicion, as The Inspector Bärlach Mysteries, with a foreword by Sven Birkerts. Together with Dürrenmatt's The Pledge: Requiem for the Detective Novel, these stories are considered classics of crime fiction, fusing existential philosophy and the detective genre.

== Plot ==
Commissar Bärlach of the Bernese police, who is dying of cancer, must solve the murder of his best officer, Lieutenant Ulrich Schmied. Bärlach is assisted in his investigation by officer Walter Tschanz. As Schmied had been investigating the crimes of Richard Gastmann, a career master criminal who is an old friend and enemy of Bärlach, suspicion immediately falls upon Gastmann. But Bärlach's and Tschanz's "investigation" of Gastmann yields an unexpected twist after Tschanz kills Gastmann, supposedly in self-defense. Bärlach then reveals that he has known all along that Tschanz is the one who murdered Schmied.

Tschanz had purposefully killed Gastmann so that Gastmann would be forever blamed for Schmied's murder. Furthermore, Bärlach had manipulated Tschanz into this action with the manner in which Bärlach had pressed forward with their seeming investigation of Gastmann. Bärlach had deliberately pushed Tschanz toward a final, fatal confrontation with Gastmann, resulting in Gastmann's death: the punishment Bärlach considers just for all of the previous crimes Gastmann had committed, but which Bärlach had been unable to prove.

In fact, Gastmann and Bärlach went back forty years. They had long ago made a personal bet with one another as to whether it was possible to commit the "perfect" crime, such that even an investigator who witnessed it would never be able to prove the perpetrator guilty. After that bet, Gastmann, as Bärlach well knew, had pursued a lifelong career as a purveyor of crime, evil in its comprehensiveness, arrogant and mocking of civilisation itself. And indeed, he always remained one step ahead of Bärlach's tireless but fruitless efforts to convict him. Gastmann recalled to Bärlach: "I wanted to prove that it was possible to commit a crime that couldn't be solved." Gastmann had been correct, and Bärlach's final plot is an acknowledgment thereof. By murdering Schmied during Schmied's investigation of Gastmann, Tschanz had ruined the terminally ill Bärlach's final chance to bring Gastmann to justice in a courtroom. Therefore, using Tschanz as a pawn, Bärlach finds an alternate method to mete out the justice for which he feels Gastmann is overdue.

== Themes ==
The central question of this book is whether or not it is right to frame a person for a crime they didn't commit, if they've committed another crime that was never proven. Bärlach affirms the question when he says to Gastmann: "I couldn't prove that it was you who committed the first crime, but I am transferring this crime to you" – therefore, Gastmann, the very embodiment of evil criminality, was finally punished.

The interplay between Bärlach and Lutz takes on a symbolic dimension. Lutz, the university-educated overseer, insists on the efficacy of modern, scientific crime-solving methods "from the Chicago school", which is based mainly on circumstantial evidence and forensics. Bärlach is skeptical, relying instead on his deep knowledge of human motives, born of lifelong experience. Tschanz, Bärlach's underling, makes use of the modern evidence-to-proof method and serves as a contrast to Bärlach's style of natural intuition and usage of human manipulation. While Tschanz's methods make ostensible progress on the case, ultimately, it is Bärlach's intuitive sense that has long since enabled him to determine the truth, and also enables him to use Tschanz to settle his old score with Gastmann.

One can understand the novel also as question: "When humans determine themselves the fate of others they become the judges, and when they become the instrument of others they become the henchmen." Having been set up by Bärlach to kill Gastmann, Tschanz says to Bärlach at the end of the story, "Then you were the judge and I the hangman". Tschanz then kills himself the following day by stopping his car on an active railroad track.

== Adaptations ==
=== Film and television ===
- The first television adaptation of Der Richter und sein Henker was by the German broadcaster Süddeutscher Rundfunk in 1957, using the same title. It aired on 7 September 1957. In 2012 the film was released on DVD for the first time.
- In 1961 the British Broadcasting Corporation produced a second adaptation. It was shown as an episode of the long-running series of televised plays BBC Sunday-Night Play titled The Judge and His Hangman. It premiered on 17 December 1961. Frank Pettingell acted in the role of Bärlach, Brian Bedford played Chanz (Tschanz). The episode does not exist in the BBC archives, and is believed to be lost.
- Daniele D'Anza directed the third adaptation in 1971/72. Radiotelevisione Italiana aired Il giudice e il suo boia on 6 February 1972, starring Paolo Stoppa as Bärlach and Ugo Pagliai as Tschanz. The TV movie has since been released on DVD in 2009.
- On 8 November 1974, the fourth adaptation was produced under the title Le juge et son bourreau for a French broadcasting corporation. The TV movie was directed by Daniel Le Comte and starred Charles Vanel in the role of Baerlach. The role of Tschanz was renamed as lieutenant Terrence, played by Gilles Ségal. It was released on DVD in 2017.
- The novel was once more made into a film in 1975, titled End of the Game, directed by Maximilian Schell, with screenplay by Dürrenmatt and Schell. Jon Voight took lead billing as Walter Tschanz, with Martin Ritt as Hans Bärlach and Robert Shaw as Richard Gastmann. Jacqueline Bisset and Friedrich Dürrenmatt also appeared in the film.

=== Stage ===
- German composer Franz Hummel's opera of the same name premiered in 2008 at the Theater Erfurt.
