= Viralukketha Veekkam =

- Theatrical poster
- Directed by: V. Sekhar
- Written by: V. Sekhar
- Produced by: S. S. Durairaju; K. Parthiban
- Starring: Livingston; Vadivelu; Vivek; Khushbu; Kovai Sarala; Kanaka
- Cinematography: G. Rajendran; P. S. Selvam
- Edited by: A. P. Manivannan
- Music by: Deva
- Production company: Thiruvalluvar Kalaikoodam
- Release date: 16 July 1999
- Running time: 155 minutes
- Country: India
- Language: Tamil

Viralukketha Veekkam (transl. Swelling should commensurate with the size of the finger) is a 1999 Indian Tamil-language comedy drama film directed by V. Sekhar. The film stars Livingston, Vadivelu, Vivek, Khushbu, Kovai Sarala and Kanaka. It was released on 16 July 1999 and became successful at the box-office. The film was remade into Telugu as Kshemamga Velli Labhamga Randi (2000), into Kannada as Yaarige Saluthe Sambala (2000) and into Hindi as Aamdani Atthanni Kharcha Rupaiya (2001).

== Plot ==
Ravishankar, Kabali, and Ramanathan are three friends living in the Thavathiru Shanmugamani Colony with their wives, Suguna, Ranjitham, and Malu. They work as mechanics at Madras Motors, while their wives share a close bond. However, the men are carefree and irresponsible, spending heavily on drinking, leaving their wives to struggle to make ends meet. They've borrowed money from Annachi, a factory peon who lends money at high interest rates, and often find themselves trapped in debt.

When a new family, Gayathri and her husband, moves in nearby, the women are surprised to see Gayathri's husband doing household chores, a stark contrast to their own husbands' chauvinistic attitudes. Inspired by Gayathri's example, the women consider getting jobs to support their families and save some money. However, their husbands are opposed to the idea. When the men are denied a bonus from their company, they're unable to pay their children's school fees, leading to their suspension. Gayathri's husband, a school teacher, steps in to help them pay the fees. To regain their wives' respect, the men borrow more money from Annachi and lavishly spend on Diwali celebrations, convincing themselves to put aside their anger and enjoy the festival.

The three friends get into a fight with their factory owner, who didn't pay their bonus, and end up losing their jobs. Kabali advises that they meet his rich friend Karuppaiyya in Bengaluru to seek the help of ₹5,00,000 (equivalent to ₹2.1 million or US$25,000 in 2023) so that they can start their own mechanic company. They lie to their wives that they're going to Bengaluru for training. However, they soon learn that Karuppaiyya is a fraud. In Chennai, the wives learn that their husbands have lost their jobs and lied to them about going for training. The families are now facing the brunt of Annachi, who demands repayment, and he leaves with confiscating the men's three bikes. The house owner asks the families to vacate as soon as possible because they have claimed his house as theirs and have incurred debts. Under Gayathri's recommendation, the three wives get jobs in a garment factory to make ends meet.

Meanwhile, the three husbands return home, beaten by the police. They learn that their wives have gone to work, which hurts their ego, and they challenge their wives to repay all their debts within the next two months. Enraged that their wives are mistreating them since Gayathri had fetched them jobs, the three husbands pull up a fight with Gayathri. She complaints to police, but Gayathri's husband intervenes and saves them from arrest. The three husbands secure jobs at a mechanic factory owned by the same person who owns the garment factory where their wives work, but they get hired by lying about their wives' disabilities. Soon, they revert to their old habits, drinking and spending lavishly, and demand that their wives quit their jobs. Annachi arrives and confiscates some appliances due to pending payments, sparking a fight between the husbands and wives. The wives intervene to protect their husbands, but the husbands beat and throw them out of the house. The husbands humiliate Gayathri's husband for helping their wives, but he beats them up. Gayathri provides emotional support to the wives. The husbands bring home a mistress, but the wives chase her away and beat their husbands.

Ravishankar's daughter is diagnosed with a heart condition, and the surgery requires ₹50,000 (equivalent to ₹210,000 or US$2,500 in 2023). Ravishankar tries to arrange the money, but their employer refuses to help due to their earlier lies. In desperation, Ravishankar encounters Karuppaiyya, who offers him a job transporting marijuana in exchange for the money. Ravishankar accepts the job to secure the funds for his daughter's surgery. Suguna meets her boss, who generously provides the money for her daughter's surgery. Meanwhile, the police track down Ravishankar for smuggling marijuana and detain them in prison. In jail, they realize their mistakes and regret not seeking help from their wives.

The wives, with the help of Gayathri's husband and their boss, arrange bail to release their husbands. After their release, the husbands are completely reformed, apologizing to Gayathri and their respective wives for their past behavior. Ravishankar and Suguna's daughter undergoes a successful operation.

== Cast ==
- Livingston as Ravishankar
- Vadivelu as Kabali
- Vivek as Ramanathan
- Khushbu as Suguna (Voice dubbed by K.R.Anuradha)
- Kanaka as Malu (Voice dubbed by Jayageetha)
- Kovai Sarala as Ranjitham
- Nassar as Gayathri's husband
- Urvashi as Gayathri
- Kumarimuthu as the house owner
- S. V. Ramadas as the car mechanic shop owner
- Jai Ganesh as the garment factory owner
- Thyagu as Karuppaiyya
- Suryakanth as Annachi, the peon
- Kalidaas as an Inspector
- Vijay Ganesh as a coworker

== Soundtrack ==
The soundtrack were composed by Deva.

Song	Singer(s)	Lyrics
"Alli Alli"	Deva	Vaali
"Pombalaya Lesa"	K. S. Chithra, S. P. Balasubrahmanyam	Kalidasan
"Pondatti Illaaina"	Mano, K. S. Chithra	Palani Bharathi
"Viralukketha Veekkam"	Deva	Thamarai
"Yettukattu Vaasal"	K. S. Chithra, Mano	Kalidasan

== Reception ==
D. S. Ramanujam of The Hindu wrote, "Keeping up with the Joneses is the crux of theme which has been tried in many earlier Tamil movies. The director being aware of it, focusses on the problem of vexed housewives turning office-goers, the plus and minus points of it and the role of unemployed husbands during such periods. All these common occurrences have been fabricated to an enjoyable level by the dialogue and screenplay of the director in this lengthy family drama of nearly three hours". Vadivelu won the Dinakaran Cinema Award for Best Comedy Actor.
