= Mohan Shankar =

Indian film actor

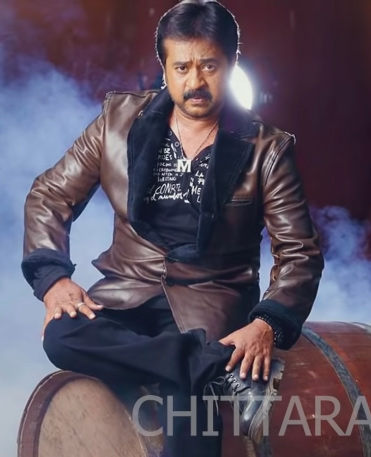
- Born: Bangalore, Karnataka, India
- Occupations: Actor; writer; director
- Years active: 1996–present
- Spouse: Vidya (m. 1998)
- Children: 1

Mohan Shankar, popularly mononymously as Mohan, is an Indian actor, writer and film director known for his work in Kannada cinema and television. After beginning his career staging, writing and acting in a variety of plays, his film career began in the late 1990s when he wrote screenplay and dialogue for a handful of Kannada-language films. After his acting debut came in Central Jail (1997), he became recognized for his roles in Yaarige Saluthe Sambala (2000), Kurigalu Saar Kurigalu (2001) and Kothigalu Saar Kothigalu (2001) and Malla (2004). Mohan turned director with Krishna Nee Late Aagi Baaro (2010) also co-starring himself.

He also wrote story for films such as Lava Kusha (2007), in addition to writing screenplay, dialogue and lyrics for the soundtrack album of more than 50 films in the 2000s and 2010s. Mohan was a contestant in the reality television show Bigg Boss Kannada in its fourth season. His wife Vidya is a singer.

== Early life ==
Mohan was born and raised in Bangalore. His father, Shankar, worked with the Hindustan Aeronautics Limited, while mother, Satyabhama, is a homemaker. He obtained a bachelor of science degree from National College, Bangalore in electronics. During this time, he began to act in and write plays. His future wife, Vidya, a singer, was his junior in the college, and the two married in 1998. They have a son together, Mayookha.

== Career ==
After briefly working for a private firm, Mohan joined the television channel Udaya TV in the mid-1990s, and worked as an art director and screenwriter for its soap operas. He then began working in films as a screenwriter, before being cast as one of the leads on Yaarige Saluthe Sambala (2000). Prior to that, he had appeared in supporting roles in films such as Central Jail (1997), Kurubana Rani (1998), Krishna Leele (2000) and Preethse (2000). After Yaarige Saluthe Sambala turned out to be a commercial success, Mohan was cast in the first two parts of the comedy film series, Kurigalu Saar Kurigalu : the namesake and Kothigalu Saar Kothigalu, both of which released in 2001 to commercial success. His appearance, partly as a woman, in Olu Saar Bari Olu (2003) received praise. A remake of the Marathi comedy film Ashi Hi Banwa Banwi (1988), it stars Mohan as a friend of Raghupati, who tricks the latter's landlord into believing that he is a woman by posing as one of his wives, named Chandralekha. He played Hanuma, a trusted friend of Ravichandran's eponymous lead, in Malla (2004), also directed by the latter. Mohan also wrote the dialogue for the film. He also made his foray into action based characters with the film Ugra Narasimha (2005).

Mohan made his directorial debut with the romance-drama Krishna Nee Late Aagi Baaro (2010), co-starring himself alongside Ramesh Aravind and Nidhi Subbaiah. Critics received the film well; the reviewer for The Times of India felt the film had "a neat script and lively narration", and termed the film "complete family entertainer". His second film was Narasimha (2012), set in the rural hinterland, where a village vigilante, played by Ravichandran, is at loggerheads with a landlord. The film was panned by critics. His other release of the year was a comedy-thriller, Manjunatha BA LLB, a remake of the Malayalam film Hallo (2007). Jaggesh features in the titular role as an alcoholic advocate, whose career is revived by a friend and a stranger who comes to him for legal representation in court.

In 2014, Mohan directed Sachin! Tendulkar Alla, a story about an autistic child that dreams of becoming a professional cricketer. The film stars Snehith as the boy, Suhasini Maniratnam as his sister and former cricketer Venkatesh Prasad as his coach. The film received acclaim for its subject matter and performances. His next directorial, a thriller titled Male Nilluvavarege was released in 2015, an adaptation of the play, Deadly Game. In addition to directing, Mohan played the lead role in the film, while also producing it and writing the film's screenplay and dialogue. He also wrote lyrics for the film's soundtrack and sang one of the tracks. Muralidhara Khajane reviewed the film positively for The Hindu. He felt the director uses rain (Male) as a metaphor "to represent guilt and tries to make the film different from the violent and romantic films hitting the screens these days." G. S. Kumar of The Times of India praised the film and wrote, "It's a one-man show by Mohan who plays his role to perfection." However, the film's theatrical release was marred by call for a bandh in Karnataka, leading to its poor commercial performance at the box office.

== Filmography ==
=== As actor ===
Year	Title	Role	Notes
1997	Central Jail		
1998	Kurubana Rani		
2000	Krishna Leele		
2000	Preethse		
2000	Yarige Salatte Sambala	Ramanath	
2001	Amma		
2001	Kurigalu Saar Kurigalu	Mohan "Moni"	
2001	Ellara Mane Dosenu		
2001	Jenugoodu		
2001	Mr. Harishchandra	Harishchandra	
2001	Kothigalu Saar Kothigalu	Mohan "Moni"	
2002	Kodanda Rama		
2003	Olu Saar Bari Olu	Sadanand a.k.a Chandralekha	
2003	Ramaswamy Krishnaswamy		
2004	Shuklambaradaram		
2004	Yarige Beku Ee Samsara		
2004	Malla	Hanuma	
2005	Lati Charge		
2005	Ugra Narasimha		
2006	VIP 5		
2007	Thamashegaagi	Mohan	
2007	Sathyavan Savithri		
2008	Akka Thangi		
2008	Accident		
2008	Ugadi		
2009	Eshtu Nagthi Nagu		
2009	Karaavali Hudugi		
2009	Gadibidi Hendti		
2010	Krishna Nee Late Aagi Baaro	Sundaram Pillai	
2010	Shambo Shankara		
2010	Tarangini	Vishal	
2012	Shikaari		
2012	Samsaaradalli Golmaal	Ramu	
2013	Chathrigalu Saar Chathrigalu	Mohan Sundar "Moni"	
2018	Hello Mama		
2020	Matte Udbhava		

=== As writer ===
Year	Title	Notes
2000	Yarige Salatte Sambla	Dialogues only
2001	Ellara Mane Dosenu	Dialogues only
2001	Mr. Harishchandra	Dialogues only
2001	Bahala Chennagide	Dialogues only
2004	Malla	Dialogues only
2004	Shuklambharadaram	
2005	Hudgeer Saar Hudgeeru	Dialogues only
2007	SMS 6260	
2007	Thamashegagi	Dialogues only
2007	Nali Naliyutha	
2007	Lava Kusha	
2010	Janani	
2010	Hoo	Dialogues only
2010	Hendtheer Darbar	
2010	Nariya Seere Kadda	
2012	Guru	Dialogues only
2013	Parari	Dialogues only
2013	Chathrigalu Saar Chathrigalu	
2014	Simhadri	Dialogues only
2017	Rikitha	Dialogues only

=== As director ===
Year	Title	Note
2010	Krishna Nee Late Aagi Baaro	
2012	Narasimha	
2012	Manjunatha BA LLB	
2014	Sachin! Tendulkar Alla	
2015	Male Nilluvavarege	
2018	Hello Mama	

=== Television ===
- Kathegara
- Silli Lalli
- Nagini 2
- Gowrishankara
- Shravani Subramanya
