= Krishna Nee Late Aagi Baaro =

2010 film by Mohan Shankar

- Directed by: Mohan Shankar
- Written by: Mohan Shankar
- Produced by: S Chandra Shekar
- Starring: Ramesh Aravind; Mohan Shankar; Neethu; Nidhi Subbaiah
- Cinematography: R. V. Nageshwara Rao
- Edited by: Baby Nagaraj
- Music by: Pravin Godkhindi
- Production company: Sri Nethra Enterprises
- Release date: 9 April 2010
- Running time: 143 minutes
- Country: India
- Language: Kannada

Krishna Nee Late Aagi Baaro (transl. Krishna, you come late! (Note: Playing off of the famous Kannada carnatic song Krishna Nee Begane Baro, which translates to "Krishna, you come fast!")) is a 2010 Indian Kannada language, a comedy film directed by actor Mohan Shankar. Besides Mohan, the film stars Ramesh Aravind, Neethu and Nidhi Subbaiah in pivotal roles. The music is composed by the flautist Pravin Godkhindi.

The film released on 9 April 2010 across Karnataka cinema halls. The critics noted the film to be funny and the lead characters performance to be noteworthy, henceforth the movie garnered mixed to positive reviews making it a commercially successful movie.

== Plot ==
Krishna (Ramesh) is a lecturer in a women's college. Lakshmi (Nidhi), his relative, is deeply in love with him. However, Krishna hates all women as taught by his Guru. Meanwhile, Sumitra Andal (Neethu) is a student of Krishna and is in love with a fashion photographer Sundaram Pillai (Mohan). But her father is against this as he is adamant to have his daughter married into his own caste. To get into wedlock, Sumitra lies to her father that Sundaram belongs to their own caste and fools everyone around her. Her father wants Krishna to be his son-in-law. How the subsequent events turn the lives of these four main characters forms the rest of the story.

== Cast ==
- Ramesh Aravind as Krishna
- Mohan Shankar as Sundaram Pillai
- Neethu as Sumithra Andal
- Nidhi Subbaiah as Lakshmi
- H. G. Dattatreya
- Doddanna
- Sundar Raj as Mukunda Iyengar
- Veena Sundar
- Tennis Krishna
- Bank Janardhan
- M. S. Umesh
- Dingri Nagaraj

== Soundtrack ==
All the songs are composed and scored by popular flautist Pravin Godkhindi. The track list consists of 7 songs most of which is penned by actor-director Mohan Shankar.

Sl No	Song title	Singer(s)	Lyrics
1	"Aa Radhe"	Mangala	Ramnarayan
2	"Bandano Banda Banda"	Rajesh Krishnan, Ananya	Mohan Shankar
3	"Baa Bega Manamohana"	Shankar Shanbag	Mohan Shankar
4	"Anthadaru Baa"	Hemanth Kumar, Chaitra H. G.	Shivananje Gowda
5	"Yaar Yaarigu"	Rajesh Krishnan, Supriya Acharya	Mohan Shankar
6	"Kanasidu Alla"	Karthik	Ramnarayan
7	"Krishna Nee Late Aagi Baaro"	Pravin Godkhindi	Mohan Shankar

== Reception ==
=== Critical response ===
Shruti Indira Lakshminarayana of Rediff.com scored the film at 2.5 out of 5 stars and says "Dialogues, also by Mohan, make you laugh only at places. Given his calibre, he could have surely come up with wittier dialogues and situations. Also, a repeat of a few scenes involving Krishna and his students could have been done away with". A critic from Deccan Herald wrote "Mohan is guilty of giving the tall, athletic Neethu costumes that are way beyond tacky. He is also guilty of draping gorgeous Nidhi from head to foot. But most important, those looking for a full-blown story will be disappointed". A critic from The Times of India scored the film at 3 out of 5 stars and wrote "Hats off to Ramesh for his brilliant performance. Mohan is as good as his direction. Neethu and Nidhi Subbaiah are excellent, as is Sundararaj. Dattanna is gracious, while Pravin Godkhindi's music is impressive".
