= Yarige Salatte Sambala =

2000 film by M.S. Rajashekar

- Directed by: M. S. Rajashekar
- Written by: Mohan Shankar (dialogue)
- Story by: V. Sekhar
- Based on: Viralukketha Veekkam (Tamil)
- Produced by: B. G. Hemalatha
- Starring: Shashi Kumar; Suhasini Maniratnam; Ananth Nag; Urvashi; Anu Prabhakar; Mohan Shankar; Umashree
- Cinematography: Prasad Babu
- Edited by: S. Manohar
- Music by: Hamsalekha
- Production company: SDM Film
- Release date: 22 May 2000
- Running time: 152 minutes
- Country: India
- Language: Kannada

Yarige Salatte Sambala (transl. Who owes the salary?) is a 2000 Indian Kannada-language comedy-drama film directed by M. S. Rajashekar and produced by B. G. Hemalatha. The film has an ensemble cast comprising Ananth Nag, Shashi Kumar, Suhasini Maniratnam, Urvashi, Anu Prabhakar, Mohan Shankar, and Umashree. It is a remake of the Tamil film Viralukketha Veekkam (1999).

The film was released in 2000 to generally positive reviews from critics who lauded the lead actor's performance and the musical score by Hamsalekha. It also emerged as a commercial success.

== Cast ==
- Ananth Nag as Venkatagiri
- Suhasini Maniratnam as Lakshmi
- Shashi Kumar as Ramesh
- Anu Prabhakar as Kusuma
- Urvashi as Suguna
- Mohan Shankar as Ramanath
- Umashree as Subbi
- Karibasavaiah as Kariya
- M. S. Umesh as house owner
- Honnavalli Krishna as Prashanth
- Kote Prabhakar as watchman
- Hemanth G Nag

== Soundtrack ==
The music of the film was composed and written by Hamsalekha.

Yaarige Salatte Sambala

Soundtrack album by Hamsalekha
- Released: 2000
- Genre: Feature film soundtrack
- Label: Manoranjan Audio

No.	Title	Singer(s)	Length
1.	"Yaarige Saluthe Sambala"	Rajesh Krishnan, Hemanth, Ramesh Chandra
2.	"Deepadinda Deepa"	Manjula Gururaj, Archana Udupa, Nanditha, Rajesh Krishnan, Ramesh Chandra, Hemanth
3.	"Malela Femalaa"	Manjula Gururaj, Archana Udupa, Nanditha, Rajesh Krishnan, G. V. Athri, Hemanth
4.	"Shravana Veeneya"	Rajesh Krishnan, Latha Hamsalekha
5.	"Priya Priya Dehadalli"	S. P. Balasubrahmanyam, Manjula Gururaj

== Reception ==
India Info wrote "What could have been a neat, message-oriented social film turns out to be a noisy, nondescript and nonsensical fare. One of the senior directors of Kannada cinema fails miserably in holding audience interest in this Kannada remake of the Tamil hit Veeralakethaveekkum".
