= Franz Hummel =

German composer and pianist (1939–2022)

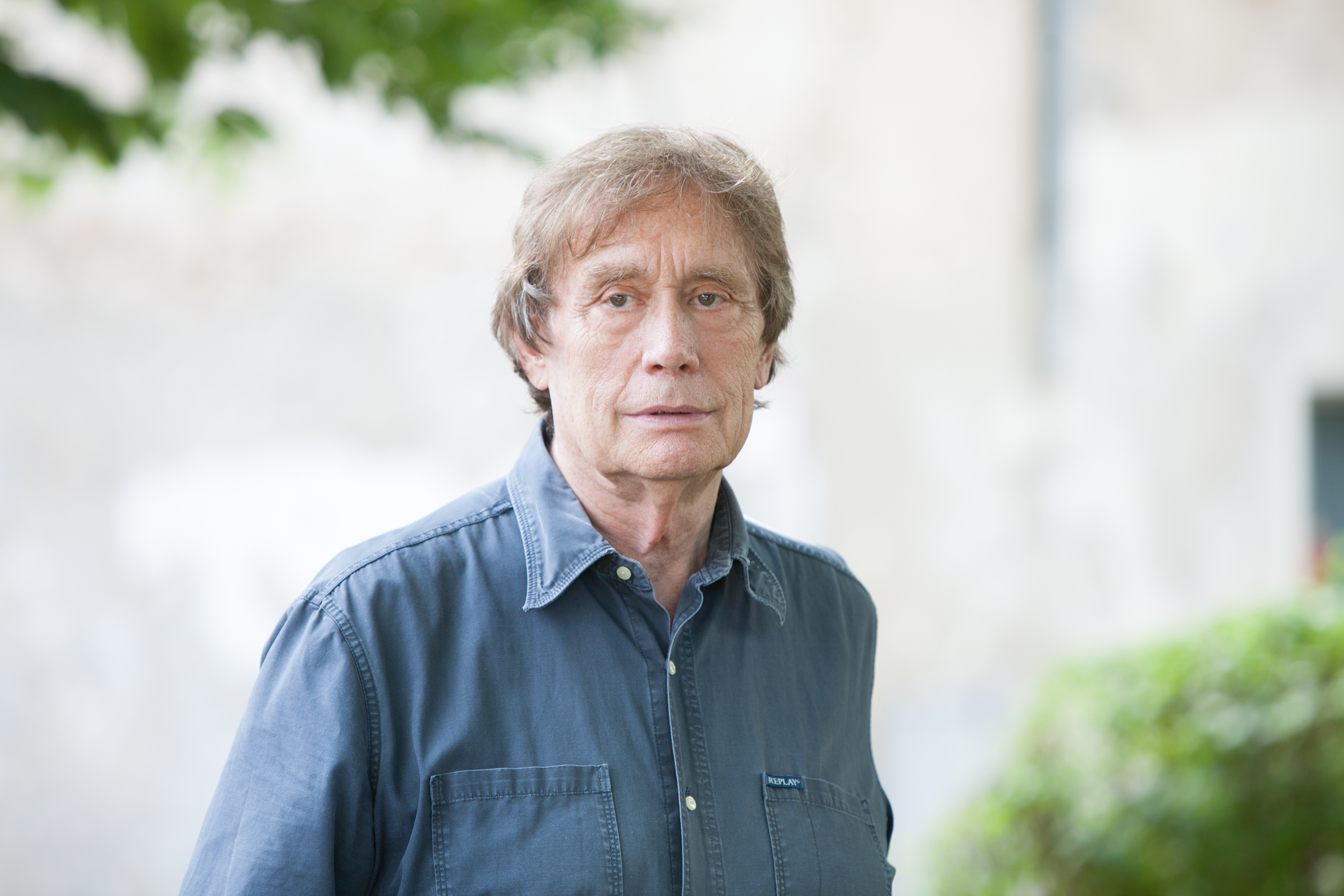
Franz Hummel (2014)

Franz Hummel (2 January 1939 – 20 August 2022) was a German composer and pianist.

From his youth, Hummel was interested in music and, in particular, the works of Richard Strauss, Eugen Papst and Hans Knappertsbusch. In Munich and Salzburg, he studied both composition and piano. He became a virtuoso pianist and travelled across Europe performing, and making 60 recordings of much of the standard repertoire of classical, romantic and contemporary piano music before. In the 1970s, he ceased to publicly perform as a pianist, choosing instead to concentrate on composition. Since then, his operas, symphonies, ballets, concerti and chamber works have been performed, many times, in the most renowned concert halls and opera houses around Europe.

Hummel's musical Ludwig II: Longing for Paradise premiered at the Festspielhaus Neuschwanstein in Füssen, and was released on CD in 2000. Then, in 2001, he began to perform again as a pianist and gave a concert with the Russian violinist, Liane Issakadse, and the clarinetist, Giora Feidman, at the Carnegie Hall in New York City. Thereafter, he began work on a follow-up piece to Ludwig II, about Richard Wagner; this was planned to be premiered in 2009, in Dresden. He has also wrote a third musical, more popular in style, first performed in the spring of 2008.

Hummel latterly contributed, with his wife Sandra, on a work about Anton Bruckner. A new opera, titled "Der Richter und sein Henker" ('The Judge and His Hangman'), based on the novel of the same name, was also penned for November 2008. This work premiered at an opera house in Erfurt. To promote Linz as the European Capital of Culture for 2009, he was commissioned to write an opera about Joseph Fouché who was exiled to Linz.

== Death ==
Hummel died on 20 August 2022, at the age of 83.

== Selected works ==
- Archaeopteryx — concerto for violin and orchestra (with vocal soloist) (1985/7?)
- Gesualdo – an opera in two acts (1996)
