= Suspicion (novel) =

1952 novel by Friedrich Dürrenmatt

- First UK edition (publ. Jonathan Cape)
- Author: Friedrich Dürrenmatt
- Original title: Der Verdacht
- Translator: Eva H. Morreale
- Language: German
- Genre: Fiction novel
- Publisher: Benziger Verlag
- Publication date: 1951-52
- Publication place: Switzerland
- English publication date: 1962
- Pages: 155

Suspicion (German: Der Verdacht) is a detective novel by the Swiss writer Friedrich Dürrenmatt featuring the Inspector Bärlach. It has also been published as The Quarry. It is the sequel to Dürrenmatt's The Judge and His Hangman.

== Plot summary ==
Inspector Hans Bärlach, at the end of his career and suffering from cancer, is recovering from an operation. He witnesses how his friend and doctor Samuel Hungertobel turns pale and becomes nervous when looking at a photograph in a magazine he is reading. The person pictured is the German Dr. Nehle who carried out horrific experiments on prisoners in the concentration camp Stutthof near Gdańsk, including operating on patients without anesthesia. Hungertobel explains that his colleague Fritz Emmenberger, who was in Chile and publishing medical articles from there during the war, closely resembles Dr. Nehle.

Bärlach suspects that Nehle and Emmenberger either changed roles during their time in Chile or happen to be the same person. A close friend of Bärlach's is the Jew Gulliver who fell victim to Nehle's experiments in Stutthof. Gulliver visits Bärlach, and they talk and drink through the night. In the morning, Bärlach is convinced that Dr. Emmenberger, who is now the director of a famous private clinic for the rich and dying in Zurich, committed Nazi war crimes under the false name of Dr. Nehle. He determines to sign himself into Emmenberger's clinic under the false name of Kramer in order to confirm his suspicions and put the suspect under pressure.

In the clinic, Bärlach easily identifies Dr. Emmenberger as the man who committed those terrible crimes. However, the cancer has weakened him and, drugged by Emmenberger's staff, he sleeps though several days. The staff proves to be blindly committed to Emmenberger, whose plan it is to brutally murder Bärlach under the pretense of an operation. Bärlach is saved in the nick of time when Gulliver steps in, murders Emmenberger and leads Bärlach out of the dubious clinic to be reunited with his friend Hungertobel in Bern.

== Publication ==
The novel was serialized in the magazine Der Schweizerische Beobachter from September 1951 to February 1952. Dürrenmatt's The Judge and His Hangman was published in the same magazine the year before. Suspicion was published as a book through Benziger Verlag in 1953. It has been published together with The Judge and His Hangman under the collective title The Inspector Barlach Mysteries.

== See also ==
- 1951 in literature
- Swiss literature
