= The Most Wonderful Evening of My Life =

- Directed by: Ettore Scola
- Produced by: Dino De Laurentiis
- Starring: Alberto Sordi
- Edited by: Raimondo Crociani
- Music by: Armando Trovajoli
- Release dates: 1972 (Italy); 1979 (France)
- Running time: 106 minutes
- Countries: Italy; France
- Language: Italian

The Most Wonderful Evening of My Life (Italian: La più bella serata della mia vita; French: La plus belle soirée de ma vie) is a 1972 Italian-French comedy drama film directed by Ettore Scola. It is based on the novel A Dangerous Game by Friedrich Dürrenmatt.

== Plot ==
Alfredo Rossi, a tax-evading Italian businessman, drives to Switzerland to deposit 100 million lire. He has miscalculated the timing, and the banks have already closed. Then he notices a mysterious black-clad woman on a motorcycle. He begins following her through the mountain roads until his car suddenly breaks down. Seeking help, he goes to a nearby castle where he is greeted by the owner, Count de La Brunetière. The count, a former defense attorney, invites Rossi to stay for dinner and participate in a game with Brunetière's three friends, all retired jurists. The game in question is a pretend trial in which Rossi will play the defendant. Rossi is reluctant to accept the invitation but then he sees Simonetta, a beautiful maidservant, and decides to stay.

During the cross-examination by the prosecutor Zorn, it transpires that Rossi may have caused the death of his boss from a heart attack. He also carried on an affair with the boss’ wife. Zorn then charges Rossi with premeditated murder. After heated closing arguments, the judge sentences him to death. The retired agents of justice then thank Rossi for being a good sport, and he is escorted to his room. The next morning he is presented with a bill for the dinner and the accompanying entertainment. He pays in cash and drives away. Then he sees the mysterious motorcycle rider again. He starts pursuing her but ends up dying in a car crash, during which the rider reveals herself to be Simonetta.

== Cast ==
- Alberto Sordi: Alfredo Rossi
- Michel Simon: Prosecutor Zorn
- Charles Vanel: Judge Dutz
- Claude Dauphin: Chancellor Bouisson
- Pierre Brasseur: Count de la Brunetière
- Janet Agren: Simonetta
- Giuseppe Maffioli: Pilet

== Reception ==
TV Guide wrote that "the film combines humor with compelling drama, which sustains viewer interest until the verdict is delivered. The irony throughout the film is typical of the oblique way Durrenmatt, the Swiss master of stagecraft, looks at the world and, in particular, the helplessness of the individual in that world." Carlo Testa called it "a transitional feature" between Scola's early films and his later, more complex ones, and one of the best examples of the Italian tragicomedy of all times. Brian Mills commented that "the film plays like an Agatha Christie whodunit with lots of twists and unexpected laughs" and added that "Sordi is at his best."
