= Ludwig II (musical) =

Musical by Franz Hummel

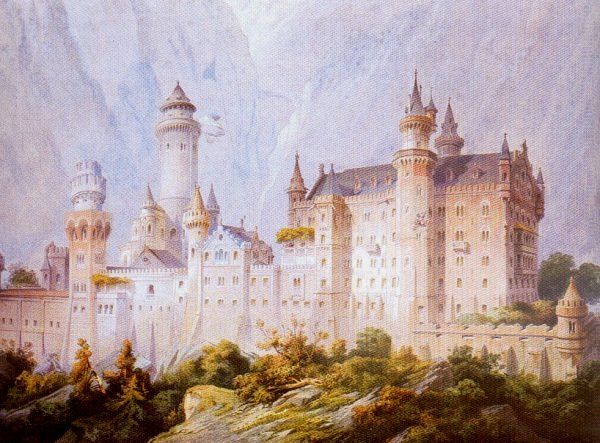
Ludwig's design for Neuschwanstein Castle

Ludwig II: Longing for Paradise (Ludwig II: Sensucht nach dem Paradies) is a German musical in five acts with music by Franz Hummel and book and lyrics by Stephan Barbarino and Heinz Hauser.

The musical was presented at the lavish Festspielhaus Füssen, which was built for it at the edge of the lake below Neuschwanstein Castle. The musical was directed by Barbarino. The story concerns Bavaria's "Mad King" Ludwig II of Bavaria, who came to power in 1864 at the age of 18, lost a war against Prussia and spent his kingdom's fortune and sovereignty, and accumulated debts, to build extravagant castles and palaces and to sponsor Richard Wagner and other artists. Ludwig was declared insane and deposed in 1886, at the age of 41. He died the next day under suspicious circumstances.

The show immediately sold out to more than half a million tourists and Germans by the time of its premiere on April 7, 2000, and it was played year-round and seen by an additional one million audience members by 2003. The musical was performed in German with supertitles in English and other languages. The theatre is now used for other productions.

== Synopsis ==
Act I: Munich, 1864

At the funeral of his father, King Maximilian II of Bavaria, Ludwig is met by three black Nymphs, who warn him of a lonely life and the dangers of water, women and politics, and encourage him to pursue his dreams and to build fantastical castles. His ministers encourage him to pursue war, but Ludwig dreams of a peaceful Bavaria, dedicated to art.

Act II: Bad Kissingen

At a ball, Ludwig and his cousin Elizabeth (Sissi) are in love, but she is married to the Emperor of Austria. Ludwig meets the famous composer Wagner. His ministers are worried about his spending. They force the king to become engaged to Sissi's sister Sophie, who in turn loves the court photographer Hanfstaengl.

Act III: At the palace

Ludwig feels helpless against his ministers and seeks comfort in music. Sissi, accompanied by the court's musical director, von Bülow, sings a song about the Eagle and the Seagull, a symbol of her hopeless love for Ludwig. Sophie sings badly on purpose so that Ludwig will feel justified in cancelling their engagement and she can marry Hanfstaengl. Ludwig adores Wagner's new opera but feels betrayed when he finds the composer in a compromising situation with Bülow's wife Cosima.

Act IV: The Realm of the Castles

Ludwig agrees to sell Bavaria's sovereignty to Prussia to found the German Empire. This gives him the money to build Neuschwanstein Castle and his other architectural fantasies. Ludwig becomes known for his nocturnal sleigh-rides and exotic feasts, and indulges in escapist fantasies. His ministers plot to have Ludwig declared insane and then deposed.

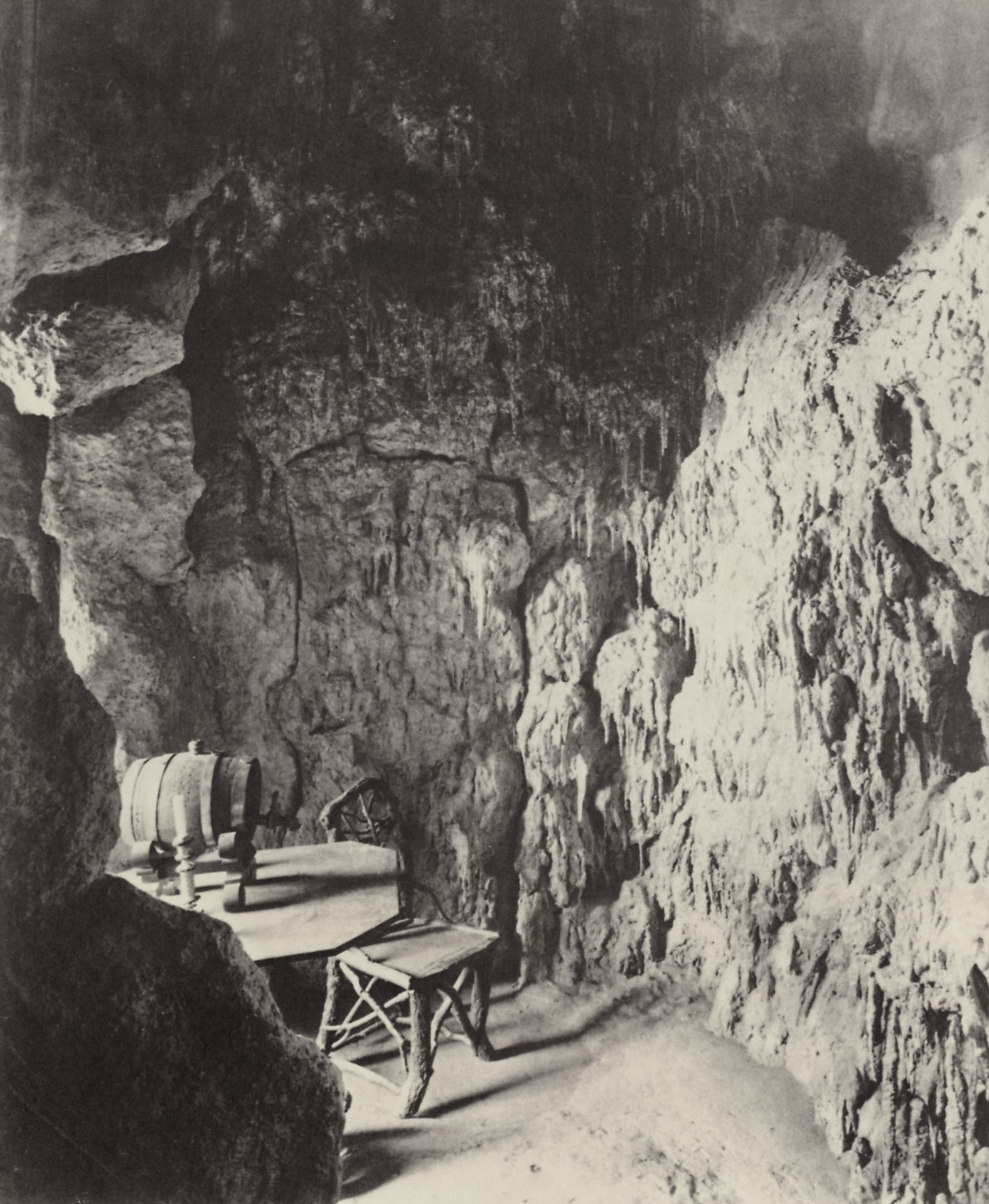
The grotto

Act V: Grotto and Lake

In his crystal grotto under the castle, Ludwig becomes a theatre director, who enacts an orgiastic bacchanal starring Lohengrin and Siegfried. He becomes embroiled in the fantasy and sings a love duet with Sissi. As his ministers are about to depose him, Ludwig relinquishes his royal crown, sceptre and cloak. His fantasies call him to the shore of Lake Starnberg.
