= The Assignment (novella) =

1986 novella by Friedrich Dürrenmatt

The Assignment (Or, on the Observing of the Observer of the Observers)
- First edition
- Author: Friedrich Dürrenmatt
- Original title: Der Auftrag
- Translator: Joel Agee
- Language: German
- Genre: detective, political thriller, novella
- Publisher: Diogenes Verlag
- Publication date: 1986
- Publication place: Switzerland
- English publication date: 1988, 2008
- Media type: Print
- Pages: 129 (2008 Ed.)
- ISBN: 0-226-17446-8 (paper, 2008)
- OCLC: 227002122
- Dewey Decimal: 833/.914 22
- LC Class: PT2607.U493 A9413 2008

Der Auftrag (English: The Assignment, subtitled Or, on the Observing of the Observer of the Observers) is a 1986 novella by the Swiss writer Friedrich Dürrenmatt. The first English publication appeared in 1988, translated by Joel Agee. The experimental narrative is divided into twenty-four parts, each one a single sentence spanning many pages. In his foreword to the 2008 English language edition, Theodore Ziolkowski notes that the inspiration for the twenty-four sentence structure came after listening to a recording of Glenn Gould performing the first half of Bach's The Well-Tempered Clavier I, itself a work in twenty-four movements. Inspiration for the plot came from the Austrian poet Ingeborg Bachmann's unfinished novel The Franza Case, which Dürrenmatt's second wife, documentary filmmaker Charlotte Kerr, was attempting to turn into a film at the time of their meeting.

== Plot summary ==
Tina von Lambert, wife of psychiatrist Otto von Lambert, has fled to an unnamed North African country (referred to as M.), where she is found raped and murdered in the desert. Otto hires F., a filmmaker, to travel to M. and reconstruct his wife's murder. The Chief of Police appears to be cooperative, however, after a police-escorted visit to the Al-Hakim ruins where the body was found, F.'s cameraman reveals that his footage has been replaced. The police then allow F. to question a number of foreign agents being held and tortured at the police ministry, all of whom tell her the same vague, inconclusive story, none confessing to the crime. Later, F. is taken to observe the execution of a Scandinavian spy in the central courtyard of the police compound; the Chief of Police claims that the spy has confessed to the crime and that the case is solved. They are shown the video of their investigation, which includes none of their footage; instead it has been turned into a propaganda film featuring the police. In despair, F. leaves her crew and walks alone through the marketplace, where she comes across the distinctive red fur coat she knows belonged to Tina von Lambert. She purchases the coat and wears it back to her hotel.

At the hotel F.'s cameraman tells her that his footage has again been taken, this time that of the execution, and that aeroplane tickets out of the country have been booked for them for early the following morning. In her room, F. finds the Head of the Secret Service, who congratulates her on her work and explains that he will use her confiscated footage to expose the corruption, weakness, and incompetence of the Chief of Police, who is planning a coup against the state government. The Head of the Secret Service asks that she continue her investigation under his protection and without the knowledge of the Chief of Police. He offers a new crew, and provides a body double, complete with a red fur coat, to travel home with the old crew in F.'s place.

F. is relocated to a derelict hotel, inhabited by a lone, aged maid. Björn Olsen, the cameraman hired by the secret service to assist F., arrives at the hotel and mistakes her for Jytte Sörensen, a Danish journalist; when he realizes his mistake, for F. speaks no Danish, he flees in a panic. Later, the Head of the Secret Police shows F. a gossip magazine with an article titled "Return from the Dead", featuring a photograph of Tina von Lambert reunited with her husband; he explains to her that the murdered woman was in fact Sörensen, a friend of Tina's, to whom Tina had given her red fur coat and passport. The reason for the murder, however, remains a mystery. Determined to find the truth, F. leaves the hotel and heads toward the desert. On the way she finds Olsen's dead body next to his exploded Volkswagen van, and while she examines the disaster she meets the cameraman Polypheme, who is filming her. Polypheme tells F. that he has video footage of Sörensen, who was on the trail of a secret before her death, and offers to show it to F. if she allows him to make a film portrait of her. Despite his dishevelled appearance and apparent drunkenness, she agrees.

Polypheme takes F out into the desert in his Land Rover, and eventually they arrive at a secret subterranean compound. The compound is a vast underground labyrinth, obviously built at great expense, though it appears to be uninhabited by anyone other than Polypheme. F. is taken to a grotesque room and left alone, and there, to her horror, she discovers a series of still frames of Olsen's death. Later in the evening she leaves her room and explores the compound, trying to track down the source of a mysterious hammering sound, which she traces to a locked door with a key in the keyhole. Out of fear she does not go inside. She finds the Land Rover and contemplates fleeing, but again is dissuaded by fear. Unable to locate her original quarters, she finds an empty room and falls asleep.

In the morning, F. is found by Polypheme, now clean and sober, and over breakfast he explains the country's political situation. The primary source of revenue for the country is a meaningless war with a neighbouring country over the empty, largely uninhabited desert in which the compound is located. The already ten-year-long war is continued to serve as a testing ground for the military products of weapons-exporting nations, from tanks to intercontinental ballistic missiles. The compound was built to measure the effects of the weapons; at one time it was staffed by human observers, many of whom were eventually replaced by observational machines. Eventually a satellite was put in orbit directly above the compound, followed by a second satellite to observe the first. The satellites made the compound redundant, and the last of the people, excepting Polypheme, left. The power was cut, and the compound was running only on battery reserves which would soon be depleted and force even Polypheme to leave. Polypheme explains that he has taken shelter in the compound and military employment because his habit of collecting sensitive and potentially ruinous photographic documentation of criminals, police, and political figures makes him a target from all sides.

Polypheme, when asked how he got his name, explains to F. that it was given to him by a man named Achilles, a bomber pilot and professor of Greek, who named him after the cyclops Polyphemus. He and Achilles were sent on a night raid of Hanoi from the USS Kitty Hawk, and Achilles lands their damaged plane despite sustaining serious head injuries, saving Polypheme in the process. From his wounds Achilles becomes criminally insane and is locked in a cell in a military hospital because of his tendency to rape and murder women. The hammering behind the locked door in the compound is revealed to be Achilles and truth about Jytte Sörensen's rape and murder comes out; Polypheme, indebted to Achilles, provided Sörensen as a sacrifice to the violent beast's only remaining desires. Polypheme shows his film portrait of Sörensen's rape and murder, and explains that F. will be the next victim.

F. is taken out into the desert wearing the red coat, forced to walk in front of the Land Rover carrying Polypheme and Achilles. The setting of Sörensen's portrait was flawed, and this time Polypheme chosen the perfect location out among the ruins of the tanks. F. has accepted her ultimate demise; however, when Achilles is almost upon she is struck by a powerful will to live. At the last possible moment the Chief of Police, his officers, and film crew come out of the tanks, and Achilles is shot repeatedly until he dies. Polypheme races off in the vehicle, but is killed soon after in an explosion, likely from a missile test.

F. returns home and her film is rejected without explanation by the television studios. She reads that the Chief of Police and the Head of the Secret Service have been executed by order of the Head of State for high treason and attempting to overthrow the government. The Head of State denies rumours that the desert is being used as a missile test ground. On the opposite page of the newspaper F. reads that a baby boy has been born to Tina and Otto von Lambert.

== Themes ==
The Technology of Observation As suggested by the subtitle of the novella (Or, on the Observing of the Observer of the Observers), the practise of observation and the means by which it is accomplished are central to the novel. The technologies of observation present range from the very simple, such as binoculars and telescopes, to video and still cameras, covert audio recording devices, and even highly sophisticated satellite technology.

Existentialism The epigraph is a quote from Either/Or by Danish existentialist Søren Kierkegaard, in whom Dürrenmatt had a lifelong interest. The excerpt highlights the anxiety and uncertainty of being, and appears again in the novel as a clue to the true identity of the murder victim thought to be Tina von Lambert.

Mistaken Identity The red fur coat that passes from Tina von Lambert to Jytte Sørensen to F. is representative of mistaken identity.

Terrorism

== Allusions ==
The underground desert compound is symbolic of the labyrinth in Greek mythology, built by Daedalus for King Minos of Crete to house the Minotaur. The criminally insane Achilles represents the Minotaur.

The red fur coat that appears throughout is inspired by the red fur coat purchased by Dürrenmatt for Charlotte Kerr. Kerr's 1992 book portraying her marriage is titled Die Frau im roten Mantel (The Woman in the Red Coat).

F. is so named as an acknowledgement of Franza, the primary figure in The Franza Case from which the initial idea for the story was taken.
