= Assignment (housing law) =

Assignment is a concept in housing law that allows the transfer of a tenancy from one person to another. Not all tenancies offer assignment and often permission from the landlord is required in order to assign a tenancy.
