= Friedrich Dürrenmatt =

Swiss author and dramatist (1921–1990)

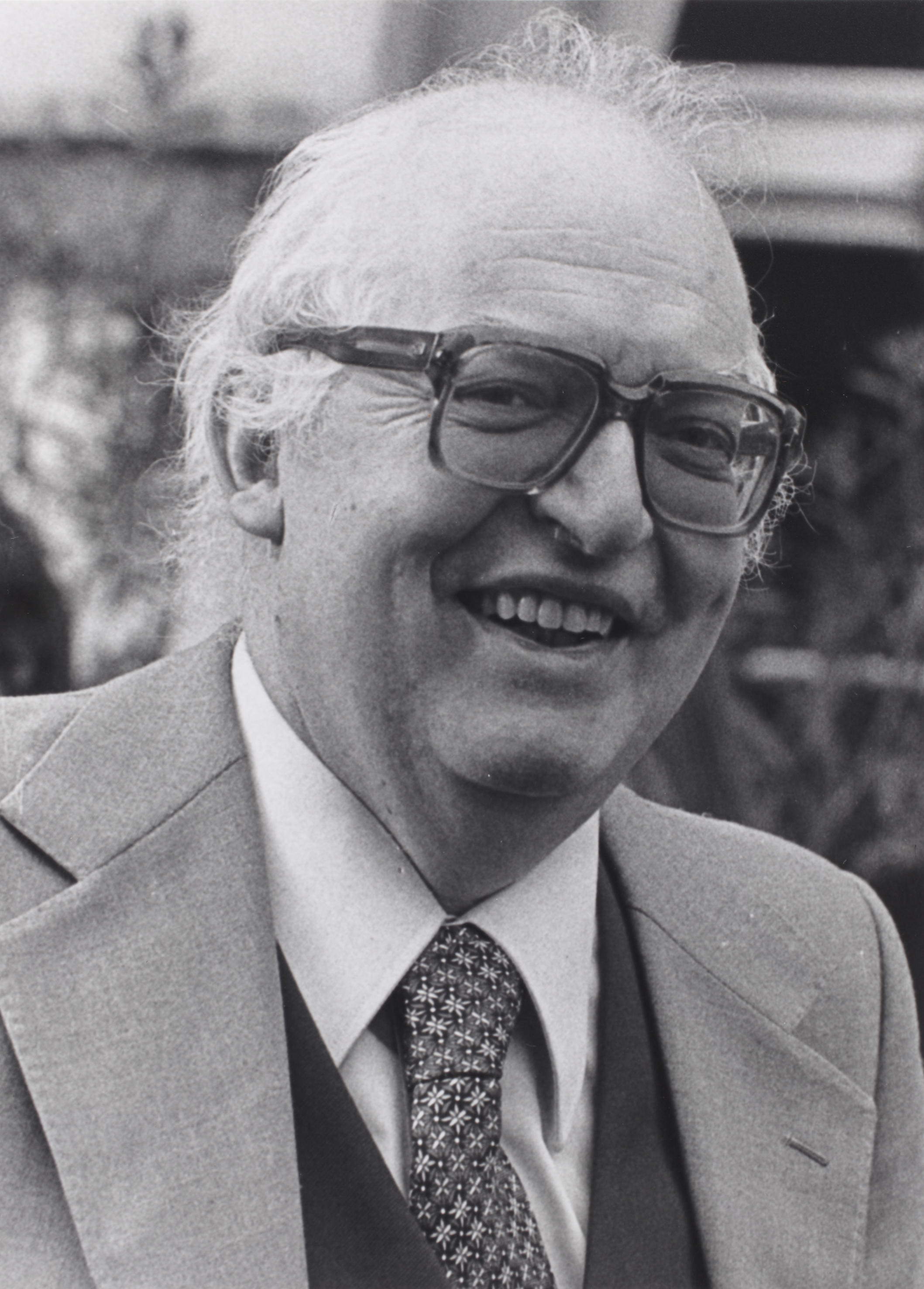
- Dürrenmatt in 1989
- Born: Friedrich Reinhold Dürrenmatt; 5 January 1921; Konolfingen, Bern, Switzerland
- Died: 14 December 1990 (aged 69); Neuchâtel, Switzerland
- Occupations: Playwright, novelist
- Spouse(s): Lotti Geißler (m. 1946; died 1983) Charlotte Kerr (m. 1984)
- Children: 3 (with Geißler)
- Writing career
- Language: German
- Years active: 1951–1990
- Notable works: The Physicists; The Visit

Friedrich Reinhold Dürrenmatt (German: [ˈfriːdrɪç ˈdʏrənˌmat]; 5 January 1921 – 14 December 1990) was a Swiss author and dramatist. He was a proponent of epic theatre whose plays reflected the recent experiences of World War II. The politically active author's work included avant-garde dramas, philosophical crime novels, and macabre satire. Dürrenmatt was a member of the Gruppe Olten, a group of left-wing Swiss writers who convened regularly at a restaurant in the city of Olten.

== Life ==
Dürrenmatt was born in Konolfingen, canton of Bern, the son of a Protestant pastor. His grandfather, Ulrich Dürrenmatt, was a conservative politician. The family moved to Bern in 1935.

Dürrenmatt began studies in philosophy, German philology, and German literature at the University of Zürich in 1941, but moved to the University of Bern after one semester where he also studied natural science. During his time as a student, he was briefly a member of the Fröntler (Frontists), a far-right movement parallel to those of National Socialism in the German Reich and fascism in Italy. He later attributed this activity to a desire to rebel against his father.

In 1943, he decided to become an author and dramatist and dropped his academic career. In 1945–46, he wrote his first play It Is Written (later revised as The Anabaptists: A Comedy in Two Acts).

Dürrenmatt traveled in 1969 to the United States, in 1974 to Israel, and in 1990 to Auschwitz in Poland.

In 1990 he gave two famous speeches, one in honour of Václav Havel ("Die Schweiz – ein Gefängnis/Switzerland – A Prison") on discovering that he had been spied on for five decades, along with 800,000 of his left-leaning fellow citizens, by the Swiss secret service; the other in honour of Mikhail Gorbachev ("Kants Hoffnung/Kant's Hope"). Dürrenmatt often compared the three Abrahamic religions and Marxism, which he also saw as a religion.

Dürrenmatt died from heart failure on 14 December 1990 in Neuchâtel aged 69.

From a young age and throughout his lifetime, Dürrenmatt also enjoyed painting, although this largely remained a private passion. Some of his works and his drawings were exhibited in Neuchâtel in 1976 and 1985 and in Zürich in 1978. Since 2000, over 1,000 of his artistic works have been exhibited in the Centre Dürrenmatt Neuchâtel, part of the Swiss National Library. The museum was designed by Mario Botta and constructed around the author's former home.

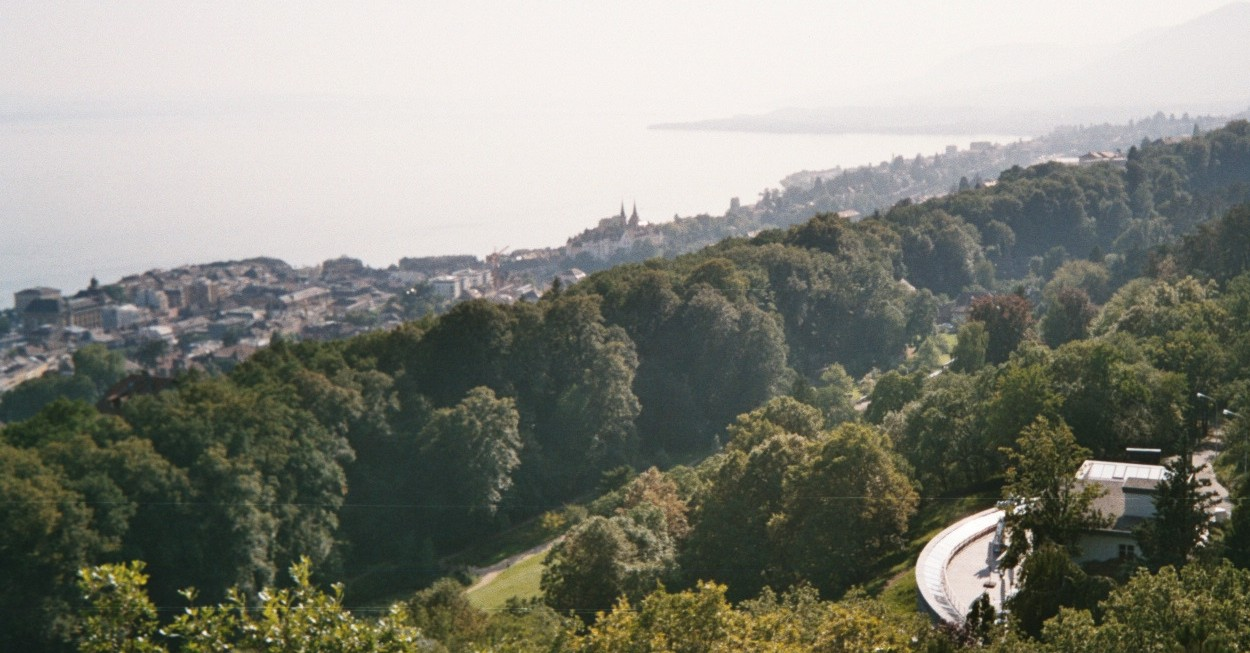
View above the Centre Dürrenmatt at Lake Neuchâtel

=== Personal life ===
On 11 October 1946, Dürrenmatt married the actress Lotti Geißler. They first lived in Basel, where their son Peter was born in 1947, before relocating to Ligerz, a village in the canton of Bern. The couple's second child, Barbara, was born in 1949, followed by Ruth in 1951. Geißler died on 16 January 1983, plunging Dürrenmatt into a personal and professional crisis.

In 1984, Dürrenmatt married actress and director Charlotte Kerr whom he met while working on a documentary in the months following Geißler's death. Kerr recorded her memories of the couple's shared life in her book Die Frau im roten Mantel (The Woman in the Red Coat).

== Dramatic works ==
Like Bertolt Brecht, Dürrenmatt explored the dramatic possibilities of epic theatre. Next to Brecht he has been called its "most original theorist".

When he was 26 his first play, It Is Written (Es steht geschrieben), premiered to great controversy. The story of the play revolves around a battle between a sensation-craving cynic and a religious fanatic who takes scripture literally, all of this taking place while the city they live in is under siege. The play's opening night in April 1947 caused fights and protests in the audience. Between 1948 and 1949 Dürrenmatt wrote several segments and sketches for the anti-Nazi Cabaret Cornichon in Zürich including the short single-act grotesque play The Rescued (Der Gerettete).

His first major success was the play Romulus the Great. Set in the year A.D. 476, the play explores the last days of the Roman Empire, presided over and brought about by its last emperor, Romulus.

As his most widely performed and translated play, The Visit (Der Besuch der alten Dame, 1956) is often regarded as Dürrenmatt's best work. It is a grotesque fusion of comedy and tragedy about a wealthy woman who offers the people of her hometown a fortune if they will avenge the wrongs done to her.

The satirical drama The Physicists (Die Physiker, 1962), which deals with issues concerning science and its responsibility for dramatic and dangerous changes to the world, has also been presented in translation.

Dürrenmatt announced his intention in 1970 to abandon literature, instead adapting established works for theatre. He went on to write detective novels and critical essays. His radio plays published in English include Hercules in the Augean Stables (Herkules und der Stall des Augias, 1954), Incident at Twilight (Abendstunde im Spätherbst, 1952) and The Mission of the Vega (Das Unternehmen der Wega, 1954). The two late works Labyrinth and Turmbau zu Babel are a collection of unfinished ideas, stories and philosophical thoughts.

== Selected bibliography ==
- Es steht geschrieben (1947)
- Der Blinde (1947)
- Romulus the Great: An Ahistorical Historical Comedy in Four Acts (Romulus der Große, 1950, play)
- The Judge and His Hangman (Der Richter und sein Henker, 1950; novel)
- Suspicion (Der Verdacht, 1951, also known as The Quarry, sequel to The Judge and his Hangman)
- "The Tunnel" ("Der Tunnel", 1952; short story)
- The Marriage of Mr. Mississippi (Die Ehe des Herrn Mississippi, 1952, play)
- An Angel Comes to Babylon (Ein Engel kommt nach Babylon, 1953, play)
- "Theatre Problems" ("Theaterprobleme", 1954, essay)
- Once a Greek (Grieche sucht Griechin, 1955, novel)
- The Visit (Der Besuch der alten Dame, 1956, play)
- A Dangerous Game (Die Panne, 1956, novel / novella, also known as Traps)
- The Pledge: Requiem for the Detective Novel (Das Versprechen: Requiem auf den Kriminalroman, 1958, novella)
- The Physicists: A Comedy in Two Acts (Die Physiker, 1962, play)
- Der Meteor (1966)
- King John (König Johann, 1968, play)
- Play Strindberg (1969, play)
- Monster Lecture on Justice and Law, with a Helvetian Interlude (Monstervortrag, 1969, lecture)
- The Coup ("Der Sturz", 1971, short story)
- Achterloo (1982)
- The Execution of Justice (Justiz, 1985)
- The Assignment (Der Auftrag, 1986, novella)
- "Switzerland—A Prison: A Speech for Vaclav Havel" ("Die Schweiz—ein Gefängnis. Rede auf Vaclav Havel", 1990, speech)

== Dürrenmatt's stories in film ==
- It Happened in Broad Daylight (1958), with a TV version made in 1997
- The Marriage of Mr. Mississippi (1961)
- The Visit (1964, Der Besuch der alten Dame)
- Once a Greek (1966, Grieche sucht Griechin)
- Der Meteor (1968)
- Play Strindberg (1969), based on Strindberg's The Dance of Death
- Shantata! Court Chalu Aahe (Silence! The Court Is in Session) (1971), based on A Dangerous Game (also known as Die Panne (Traps))
- Последнее дело комиссара Берлаха (Inspector Bärlach Last Case, based on Der Verdacht) (1971, in Russian)
- La più bella serata della mia vita (1972, by Ettore Scola, based on La Panne)
- Авария (The Breakdown, based on Die Panne) (1974, in Russian)
- End of the Game (1975, by Maximilian Schell), based on The Judge and His Hangman, and in which Dürrenmatt himself appears in two scenes
- The Deadly Game (1982, Trapp) based on A Dangerous Game
- Cumartesi Cumartesi (1984, Salam, stories in film)
- Физики (The Physicists) (1988, in Russian)
- Визит дамы (The Visit of the Lady) (1989, in Russian)
- Szürkület (Twilight) (1990, by György Fehér) based on the Es geschah am hellichten Tag movie script
- Hyènes (1992), adaptation of The Visit by the Senegalese moviemaker Djibril Diop Mambéty
- Jesienny wieczór (An Autumn Evening, based on Abendstunde im Spätherbst) (1992, in Polish)
- Justiz (1993)
- The Pledge (2001), based on the novel Das Versprechen, which is in turn based on the Es geschah am hellichten Tag movie script
- Male Nilluvavarege (2015) Kannada movie is based on A Dangerous Game
- Chehre (2021) Hindi movie is based on A Dangerous Game

== Adaptations ==
His novel, A Dangerous Game (also known as Die Panne (Traps)) was adapted into a Marathi play, Shantata! Court Chalu Aahe (Silence! The Court Is in Session) by Indian playwright Vijay Tendulkar in 1967. The play has since then been performed in various Indian languages, and made into a film by the same name by Satyadev Dubey. It was also adapted into the 2021 Hindi feature film Chehre.

His play The Visit has been adapted and Indianised into a play called Miss.Meena by Chennai-based theatre group 'perch'. The Visit has also been adapted as a musical by Kander and Ebb.

His play Incident at Twilight has been adapted into a play called Sann 2025 by Piyush Mishra.

In November 2024, Ian McDiarmid adapted A Conversation at Night and An Incident at Twilight under the name Different Truths for BBC Radio Drama on 3. It featured Ian McDiarmid, Jim Broadbent, Michael Moreland and Ian Dunnett Jnr.
