= Suhasini Maniratnam =

Indian actress, director, producer, writer (born 1961)

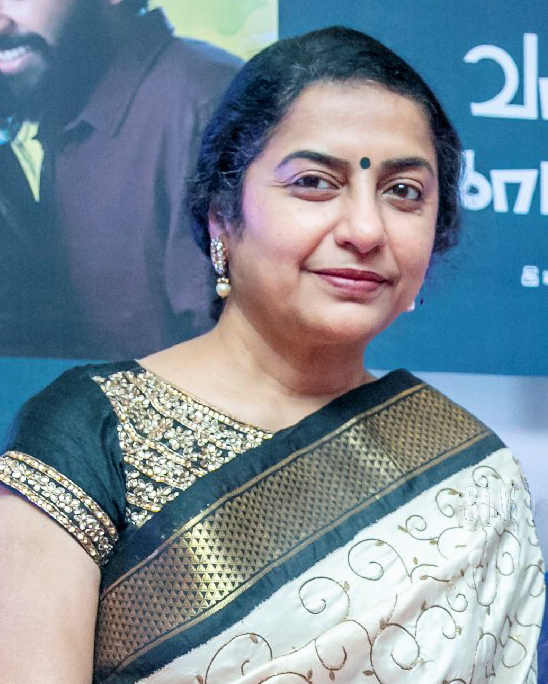
- Suhasini at Vaanam Kottatum audio launch
- Born: Suhasini Charuhasan; 15 August 1961 (age 65); Paramakudi, Madras State, India
- Occupations: Actress; director; producer; writer; dubbing artist
- Years active: 1980–present
- Spouse: Mani Ratnam (m. 1988)
- Children: 1
- Father: Charuhasan
- Family: See Haasan family

Suhasini Maniratnam (née Charuhasan; born 15 August 1961) often credited as Suhasini, is an Indian actress, film director, writer, voice actress, television presenter and philanthropist known for her works predominantly in Telugu, Tamil, Kannada and Malayalam films. Widely regarded as one of South Indian cinema's most accomplished actresses in the 1980s and 1990s, Suhasini is known for her versatility, natural acting, and ability to portray strong, relatable women. She has received numerous accolades, including one National Film Award, four Filmfare Awards South, two Kerala State Film Awards, two Nandi Awards and a Tamil Nadu State Film Award. Suhasini served as the Honorary Consul of the Grand-Duchy of Luxembourg for South India from 2015 to 2020.

Suhasini had her first leading role in Mahendran's Tamil film, Nenjathai Killathe (1980), for which she won the Tamil Nadu State Film Award for Best Actress. Her Telugu debut came through Bharathiraja's Kotha Jeevithalu in 1981. Her subsequent breakthrough roles came in K. Balachander's Benkiyalli Aralida Hoovu (1983), for which she won the Filmfare Award for Best Actress; Swati (1984), for which she won numerous awards including the Nandi Award for Best Actress; and in Balachander's Sindhu Bhairavi (1985), for which she won the National Film Award for Best Actress. Suhasini forayed into Malayalam cinema through Padmarajan's Koodevide (1983), which won her the Kerala Film Critics Association Award for Best Actress, and further found success through Ezhuthapurangal (1987) that fetched her first Kerala State Film Award for Best Actress. Throughout the 1980s and 1990s, she continued to feature in several box-office successful and critically acclaimed films in Tamil, Telugu, Malayalam and Kannada cinema.

Besides acting, Suhasini is prominently known as a writer, who has written scripts and dialogues for the films such as Roja (1992), Thiruda Thiruda (1993), Iruvar (1997) and Raavanan (2010). She debuted as a voice over artist through the film, Thalapathi (1991). In 1991, she expanded to direction with the television series, Penn. Her first feature film to be directed was Indira in 1995. In 2010, she founded "Naam Foundation", a Charitable trust, to empower the underprivileged single women.

== Early life ==
Suhasini was born at Paramakudi in the Ramanathapuram district of Tamil Nadu to lawyer and veteran actor Charuhasan and Komalam. She studied at Yadhava Christian School and thereafter at a government middle school in Paramakudi before moving to Madras at the age of 12 to live with her uncle Kamal Haasan and her grandmother. She then resumed her education at Ramakrishna Mission Sarada Vidyalaya in Chennai and at Queen Mary's College, Chennai.

Suhasini's entry into the world of movies was quite accidental. Before completing her B.Sc. degree at college, she enrolled at the Madras Film Institute to learn cinematography. She then became the first woman to graduate from the Madras Film Institute and began her career as a technician on the film set. She belongs to the Brahmin community. Her paternal cousins Anu Hasan, Shruti Haasan, and Akshara Haasan are also actors.

== Film career ==
=== As an actress ===
While working as a camera assistant to Ashok Kumar, the cinematographer, during her second year at Film Institute, she was spotted by director Mahendran. Suhasini made her film debut in 1980 with the Tamil movie Nenjathai Killathe. For her first movie, she won the Tamil Nadu State Film Award for Best Actress. She was introduced to Malayalam cinema through Padmarajan's Koodevide (1983), which also featured Mammootty. She appeared in the AFI Fest nominated feature film Vanaprastham (1999), which starred Mohanlal.

She has acted with the late Vishnuvardhan in Bandhana (1984), Suprabhatha (1988), Muthina Haara (1990), Himapatha (1995), Hendithghelthini (1998), Maathaad Maathaadu Mallige (2007) and School Master (2010).

She won the National Film Award for Best Actress for her role in the 1985 Tamil film Sindhu Bhairavi, directed by K. Balachander.

=== As a director ===
In 1991, Suhasini directed the anthology mini-series Penn shown on Madras Doordarshan. The series featured eight standalone episodes examining the lives of South Indian women, and starred several of her contemporaries such as Shobana, Revathi, Radhika and Amala as protagonists.

In 1995, she stepped into direction, helming her first film Indira and introduced her sister Anu Haasan in the lead role. In November 1997, Suhasini directed a short television film titled Swayamvaram featuring Suchitra Krishnamoorthi and Rajiv Menon. The script had been written by Sujatha and commissioned by Revathi and Suresh Menon.

Suhasini directed a segment titled "Coffee, Anyone?" in Amazon Prime's Putham Pudhu Kaalai (2020) and featured in the leading role alongside her cousins Shruti Haasan, Anu Hasan and her mother Komalam.

== Other work ==
Suhasini and her husband Mani Ratnam have been involved in the running of their production company Madras Talkies since 1997.

=== Honorary consul ===
Suhasini was appointed the honorary consul of the Grand Duchy of Luxembourg in 2015. She held the post until 2020.

=== Goodwill and brand ambassador ===
==== Naam Foundation ====
“Women empowerment starts at home. My mother raised me to be independent and my father was progressive. He was the one who encouraged me to become an actress. I have been very lucky,” shared Suhasini. during a conversation with Mohammed Ali Baig at Cinematics

Suhasini founded Naam Foundation in 2010 with the objective to empower single women from disadvantaged backgrounds by offering opportunities for self-worth and independence. The foundation offers a range of programs including medical aid, self-defense training, vocational and education support, counseling, and legal aid for women and their children.

== Personal life ==
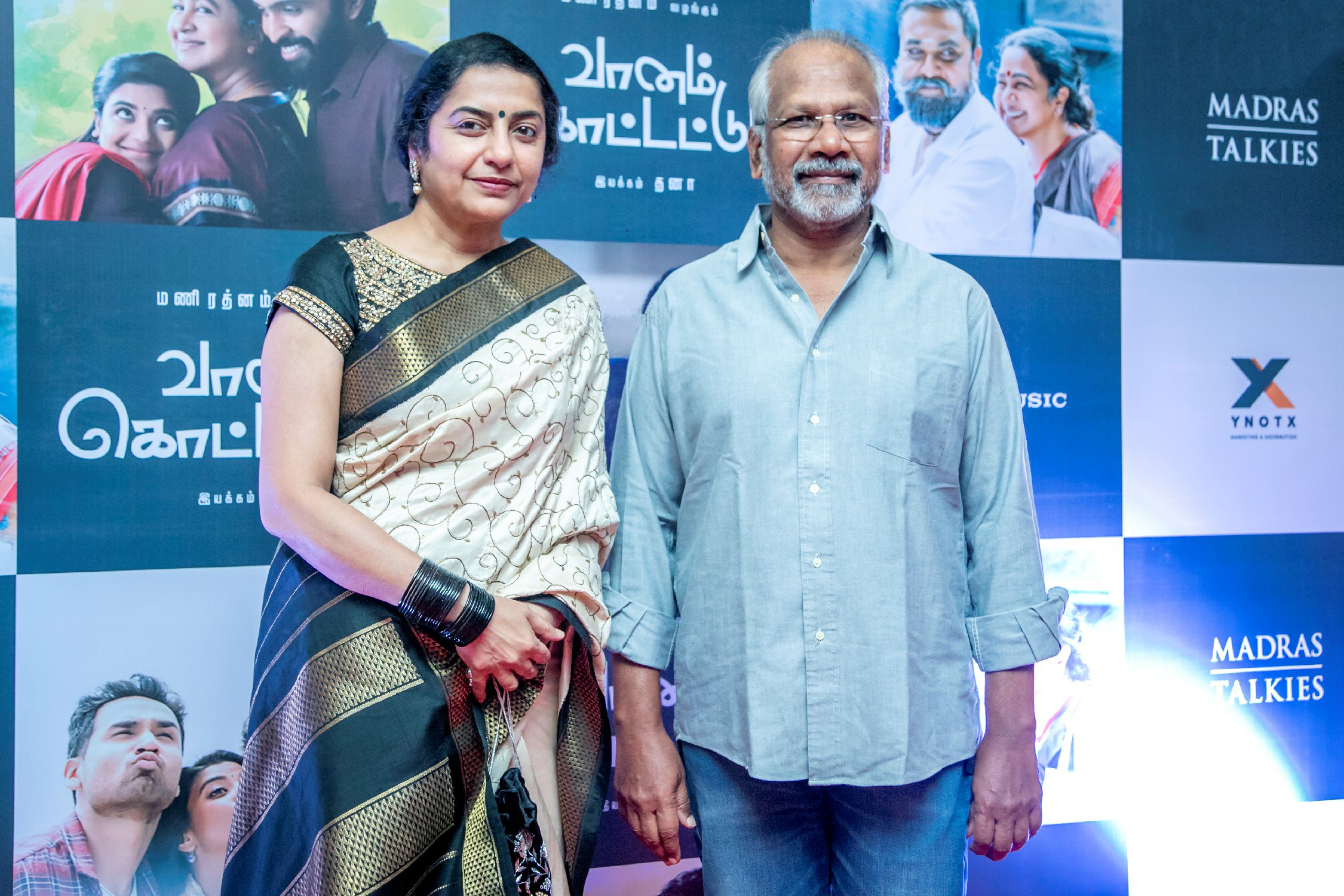
Suhasini with her husband Mani Ratnam

Suhasini married film director Mani Ratnam on 26 August 1988 and the couple has a son, Nandan, born in 1992.

== Awards ==
National Film Awards

- Best Actress – Sindhu Bhairavi (1985)

Filmfare Awards South

- Best Actress – Kannada – Benkiyalli Aralida Hoovu (1983)
- Best Actress – Telugu – Swathi (1984)
- Best Actress – Kannada – Suprabhatha (1988)
- Best Actress – Kannada – Muthina Haara (1990)

Kerala State Film Awards

- Best Actress – Ezhuthapurangal (1987)
- Best Actress – Theerthadanam (2001)

Kerala Film Critics Association Awards

- Best Actress – Koodevide (1983)

Tamil Nadu State Film Awards

- Best Actress – Nenjathai Killathe (1980)

Nandi Awards

- Best Actress – Swathi (1984)
- Best Supporting Actress – Nuvvu Naaku Nachav (2001)

Cinema Express Awards

- Best Actress for Theerthadanam

== Filmography ==
Order based on number of films that she acted in.

Key
| † | Denotes films that have not yet been released |

=== Telugu ===
List of Suhasini Maniratnam Telugu film credits
| Year | Title | Role | Notes |
|---|---|---|---|
| 1981 | Kotha Jeevithalu | Jothi | |
| 1982 | Manchu Pallaki | Gita | |
| 1982 | Manishiko Charithra | Chithra | |
| 1983 | Bahudoorapu Batasari | Subhashini | |
| 1983 | Maga Maharaju | | |
| 1983 | Muddula Mogudu | Sarala | |
| 1983 | Subha Muhurtham | | |
| 1983 | Mukku Pudaka | Mangatayaru | |
| 1984 | Nirdhoshi | | |
| 1984 | Challenge | Lakshmi | |
| 1984 | Aparadhi | | |
| 1984 | Intiguttu | | |
| 1984 | Mangammagari Manavadu | Malli | |
| 1984 | Justice Chakravarthy | Lakshmi | |
| 1984 | Adigo Alladigo | | |
| 1984 | Bava Maradallu | | |
| 1984 | Manishiko Charitra | | |
| 1984 | Illalu Priyuralu | | |
| 1984 | Swati | Swathi | Won—Filmfare Award for Best Actress – Telugu; Won—Nandi Award for Best Actress |
| 1985 | Kongumudi | Susheela | |
| 1985 | Manglya Bandham | | |
| 1985 | Maharaju | | |
| 1985 | Bullet | Usha | |
| 1985 | Dampatyam | Dr. Lalitha | |
| 1985 | Siksha | Bhagyalakshmi | |
| 1985 | Jackie | | |
| 1985 | Mugguru Mitrulu | | |
| 1985 | Sravanthi | Sravanthi | Nominated—Filmfare Award for Best Actress – Telugu |
| 1986 | Chantabbai | Jwala | |
| 1986 | Santhi Nivasam | Lekha | |
| 1986 | Sravana Sandhya | | |
| 1986 | Karpoora Deepam | Manasa | |
| 1986 | Muddula Manavaralu | | |
| 1986 | Rakshasudu | Sumatri | |
| 1986 | Shanti Nivasam | | |
| 1986 | Sirivennela | Subhashini | Nominated—Filmfare Award for Best Actress – Telugu |
| 1986 | Kirathakudu | Swetha | |
| 1986 | Police Officer | Seetha | |
| 1987 | Thene Manasulu | Radha | |
| 1987 | President Gari Abbai | Latha | |
| 1987 | Samsaram Oka Chadarangam | Uma | Nominated—Filmfare Award for Best Actress – Telugu |
| 1987 | Punya Dampathulu | | |
| 1987 | Punnami Chandrudu | | |
| 1987 | Gouthami | Gouthami | |
| 1987 | Lawyer Suhasini | Suhasini | |
| 1987 | Aradhana | Jennifer | |
| 1987 | Brahma Nayudu | | |
| 1988 | Anna Chellelu | Herself | Cameo |
| 1988 | Bharya Bhartalu | Ashalatha | |
| 1988 | Chuttalabbayi | | |
| 1988 | Chattamto Chadarangam | Padma | |
| 1988 | Varasudochhadu | Annapurna | |
| 1988 | Manchi Donga | Madhavi | |
| 1988 | Ramudu Bheemudu | Swathi | |
| 1988 | Marana Mrudangam | Uthpala | |
| 1988 | Aakhari Poratam | Sunadha Mala | |
| 1989 | Mamathala Kovela | | |
| 1989 | Paape Maa Pranam | Aruna | |
| 1989 | Bala Gopaludu | Rekha | |
| 1990 | Yama Dharmaraju | | |
| 1991 | Amma | Dharani | |
| 1992 | Akka Mogudu | | |
| 1993 | Ratha Sarathi | Dr. Shakunthala | |
| 1994 | Subhalagnam | Meena | |
| 1996 | Ramudochadu | Arundathi | |
| 1996 | Hello Guru | | |
| 1997 | Pelli Pandiri | Dr. Prabhavathi | |
| 1997 | Egire Paavurama | Yashodhamma | |
| 1998 | Ooyala | | |
| 1998 | Padutha Theeyaga | Radha | |
| 1998 | Manasichi Choodu | | |
| 2000 | Sakutumba Saparivaara Sametam | Vaani | |
| 2001 | Nuvvu Naaku Nachav | Sujatha | |
| 2003 | Abhimanyu | Janaki | |
| 2004 | Pedababu | Pedababu's mother | |
| 2004 | Dost | Snehalatha | |
| 2006 | Seethakoka Chiluka | Collector | |
| 2006 | Valliddari Vayasu Padahare | Puja's mother | |
| 2006 | Rakhi | Meenakshi Iyer | |
| 2007 | Sri Mahalakshmi | Lakshmi's sister | |
| 2008 | Sangamam | Dr. Geetha | |
| 2008 | Amma Cheppindi | Bose's mother | |
| 2010 | Leader | Rajeswari Devi | Nominated—Filmfare Award for Best Supporting Actress – Telugu |
| 2010 | Varudu | Sandy's mother | |
| 2011 | Bhale Mogudu Bhale Pellam | Madhavi | |
| 2012 | Gabbar Singh | Gabbar Singh's mother | Nominated—SIIMA Award for Best Supporting Actress – Telugu |
| 2012 | Uu Kodathara? Ulikki Padathara? | Suguna | |
| 2013 | Baadshah | Baadshah's mother | |
| 2013 | Minugurulu | Collector | |
| 2014 | Legend | Jaidev's mother | Cameo |
| 2017 | Okkadu Migiladu | | |
| 2018 | Tholi Prema | Aditya's mother | |
| 2018 | Touch Chesi Chudu | Shalini's mother | |
| 2018 | Satya Gang | | |
| 2019 | Yatra | Sabitha Indra Reddy | |
| 2019 | Suryakantham | Supriya | |
| 2020 | Entha Manchivaadavuraa | Jaya | |
| 2022 | Malli Modalaindi | Suja | |
| 2022 | Balamevvadu | Dr. Yashoda | |
| 2022 | Gurthunda Seethakalam | Dr. X | |
| 2023 | Mr. Pregnant | Doctor | |
| 2023 | Spark Life | Dr. Indira | |
| 2024 | Honeymoon Express | Tripura Sundari | |

=== Tamil ===
List of Suhasini Maniratnam Tamil film credits
| Year | Title | Role | Notes |
|---|---|---|---|
| 1980 | Nenjathai Killathe | Viji | Debut film as an actress |
| 1980 | Nenjathai Killathe | Viji | Won—Tamil Nadu State Film Award for Best Actress |
| 1980 | Nenjathai Killathe | Viji | Nominated—Filmfare Award for Best Actress – Tamil |
| 1981 | Deiva Thirumanangal | | |
| 1981 | Kudumbam Oru Kadambam | Parvathi | |
| 1981 | Madhumalar | | |
| 1981 | Palaivana Solai | Geetha | Nominated—Filmfare Award for Best Actress – Tamil |
| 1982 | Vadivangal | | |
| 1982 | Marumagale Vazhga | Lakshmi | |
| 1982 | Azhagiya Kanney | | |
| 1982 | Thottal Sudum | | |
| 1982 | Lottery Ticket | | |
| 1982 | Kalyana Kalam | Geetha | |
| 1982 | Nandri, Meendum Varuga | | |
| 1982 | Agaya Gangai | Sumathi | |
| 1982 | Gopurangal Saivathillai | Arukkani | Nominated—Filmfare Award for Best Actress – Tamil |
| 1983 | Veetile Raman Velile Krishnan | Chitti | |
| 1983 | Uruvangal Maralam | Lakshmi | |
| 1983 | Oru Indhiya Kanavu | Anamika | |
| 1983 | Poikkal Kudhirai | | Guest appearance |
| 1983 | Apoorva Sahodarigal | | |
| 1983 | Thai Veedu | Geetha | |
| 1983 | Puthiya Sangamam | | |
| 1985 | Sindhu Bhairavi | Sindhu | Won—National Film Award for Best Actress |
| 1985 | Sindhu Bhairavi | Sindhu | Nominated—Filmfare Award for Best Actress – Tamil |
| 1987 | Manathil Uruthi Vendum | Nandini | |
| 1987 | Ananda Aradhanai | | |
| 1987 | Dhoorathu Pachai | | |
| 1988 | Dharmathin Thalaivan | Sumathi | |
| 1988 | En Bommukutty Ammavukku | Lakshmi | Nominated—Filmfare Award for Best Actress – Tamil |
| 1989 | Thendral Puyalanadhu | Gautami | |
| 1989 | En Purushanthaan Enakku Mattumthaan | Saradha | |
| 1991 | Penn | | Also director |
| 1993 | Chinna Kannamma | Uma | |
| 1996 | Irattai Roja | Geetha | |
| 1997 | Nandhini | Nandhini | |
| 2001 | Chocolate | Saradha | |
| 2003 | Vaseegara | Priya's Aunt | |
| 2003 | Eera Nilam | Chinnathayi | |
| 2004 | Shock | Exorcist | |
| 2007 | Satham Podathey | Gynecologist | |
| 2008 | Aegan | Shiva's mother | |
| 2009 | Balam | Mahesh's sister-in-law | |
| 2010 | Thillalangadi | Krishna's mother | |
| 2011 | Seedan | Thangam | |
| 2014 | Ramanujan | Komalatammal | Nominated—Vijay Award for Best Supporting Actress |
| 2015 | Kanchana 2 | Channel MD | |
| 2017 | Nibunan | Mrs.Emmanuel | |
| 2017 | Chennaiyil Oru Naal 2 | Sister Lily | |
| 2018 | Sollividava | Madhu's aunt | |
| 2019 | Boomerang | Gowri Thiruselvan | |
| 2019 | Kee | Siddharth's mother | |
| 2020 | Putham Pudhu Kaalai | Valli | Amazon Prime anthology film; also director |
| 2025 | The Verdict | Elisa | |
| 2026 | Anantha | Annapurna | |
| 2026 | Charukesi | Bhagyam | |

=== Kannada ===
List of Suhasini Maniratnam Kannada film credits
| Year | Title | Role | Notes |
|---|---|---|---|
| 1983 | Benkiyalli Aralida Hoovu | Kavitha | Won—Filmfare Award for Best Actress – Kannada |
| 1984 | Bandhana | Dr. Nandini | |
| 1986 | Hosa Neeru | Bhavana | |
| 1986 | Usha | Usha | |
| 1988 | Suprabhatha | Hema | Won—Filmfare Award for Best Actress – Kannada |
| 1990 | Muthina Haara | Annapurna | Won—Filmfare Award for Best Actress – Kannada |
| 1995 | Himapatha | Sumithra | |
| 1997 | Amruthavarshini | Veena | |
| 1997 | Ganga Yamuna | | Cameo |
| 1998 | Hendithghelthini | Radha | |
| 1999 | Vishwa | Indu | |
| 2000 | Yaarige Saluthe Sambala | Lakshmi | |
| 2000 | Swalpa Adjust Madkolli | | |
| 2001 | Ellara Mane Dosenu | Media reporter | |
| 2003 | Annavru | Gowri | |
| 2005 | O Gulabiye | | |
| 2006 | Mohini 9886788888 | Mohini's mother | |
| 2007 | Maathaad Maathaadu Mallige | Kanaka | Nominated—Filmfare Award for Best Actress – Kannada |
| 2010 | Eradane Maduve | Malavika | |
| 2010 | School Master | Sneha | |
| 2010 | Deadly-2 | | |
| 2011 | Sanju Weds Geetha | Lakshmi | |
| 2011 | Mathond Madhuvena | Malavika | |
| 2013 | Myna | Doctor | |
| 2014 | Sachin! Tendulkar Alla | Sakshi Dinesh | Won—SIIMA Award for Best Actress in a Supporting Role – Kannada |
| 2015 | Rebel | Anupama | |
| 2015 | Masterpiece | Durga | |
| 2016 | Viraat | Chief Minister | |
| 2016 | Preethiyalli Sahaja | | |
| 2016 | Naani | Suraksha | |
| 2017 | Masti Gudi | Chief Minister | |
| 2017 | Vismaya | Mrs. Immanuel | |
| 2018 | Prema Baraha | Madhu's aunt | |
| 2018 | Ambi Ning Vayassaytho | Nandini | |
| 2019 | Yaana | Sujatha | |
| 2019 | Ayushman Bhava | Harshini Prasad | |
| 2020 | Varnapatala | Doctor | |
| 2022 | Monsoon Raaga | Hasini | |

=== Malayalam ===
List of Suhasini Maniratnam Malayalam film credits
| Year | Title | Role | Notes |
|---|---|---|---|
| 1983 | Koodevide | Alice | |
| 1983 | Adaminte Vaariyellu | Vasanthi | |
| 1984 | Thathamme Poocha Poocha | Kalyani | |
| 1984 | Unni Vanna Divasam | Anu | |
| 1984 | Aksharangal | Bharathi | |
| 1984 | Aarorumariyathe | Sudha | |
| 1984 | Ente Upasana | Lathika | |
| 1985 | Katha Ithuvare | Rekha | |
| 1986 | Pranamam | Usha/Thulasi | |
| 1986 | Rakkuyilin Ragasadassil | Janani | |
| 1987 | Ezhuthapurangal | Rajalakshmi | Won—Kerala State Film Award for Best Actress |
| 1987 | Manivathoorile Aayiram Sivarathrikal | Neena | |
| 1988 | Oohakachavadam | Malathy | |
| 1989 | Oru Sayahnathinte Swapnam | Capt. Alice Cherian | |
| 1993 | Samooham | MLA Rajalekshmi | |
| 1997 | Bhaaratheeyam | Revathy | |
| 1999 | Varnachirukukal | Anjali Gupta | |
| 1999 | Vanaprastham | Subhadra Thamburatti | |
| 2001 | Theerthadanam | Vinodini | Won—Kerala State Film Award for Best Actress |
| 2002 | Nammal | Snehalatha | |
| 2005 | Vacation | Celina | |
| 2006 | Pachakuthira | Akash's mother | Photo appearance |
| 2009 | Vilapangalkkappuram | Dr. Mary Varghese | |
| 2009 | Nammal Thammil | Rosy IAS | |
| 2009 | Makante Achan | Rema | |
| 2013 | Kalimannu | Dr. Sophy | |
| 2015 | Love 24x7 | Dr. Sarayu | |
| 2015 | Salt Mango Tree | Deepika | |
| 2017 | Solo | Mrs.Vidya Ramachandran | |
| 2021 | Marakkar: Arabikadalinte Simham | Khadeejumma | |
| 2023 | Pookkaalam | Clara | |
| 2025 | Madhuram Jeevamrutha Bindu | | |
| 2026 | Hail Mary † | TBA | |
| 2026 | Anchaam Pramaanam † | Gracy | Filming |

=== Other language ===
List of Suhasini Maniratnam other language film credits
| Year | Title | Role | Language | Ref. |
|---|---|---|---|---|
| 2003 | Stumble | Nandini | English | |
| 2015 | Waiting | Pankaja | Hindi | |

=== As director and writer ===
| Year | Title | Credited as | | Notes |
| Year | Title | Director | Writer | Notes |
|---|---|---|---|---|
| 1991 | Penn | Yes | Yes | TV series |
| 1993 | Thiruda Thiruda | No | Dialogue | |
| 1995 | Indira | Yes | Yes | |
| 1997 | Iruvar | No | Dialogue | |
| 1999 | Ganesh & Vasanth | Yes | Screenplay | Sun TV serial; co-directed by V. Priya |
| 2010 | Raavanan | No | Dialogue | |
| 2020 | Putham Pudhu Kaalai | Yes | Yes | Amazon Prime film; for the segment Coffee, Anyone? |

=== Television ===
List of Suhasini Maniratnam television credits
| Year | Title | Role | Language | Channel | Notes |
|---|---|---|---|---|---|
| 1991 | Penn | | Tamil | Madras Doordarshan | |
| 1999 | Ganesh & Vasanth | | Tamil | Sun TV | |
| | Hasini Pesum Padam | Host | Tamil | Jaya TV | |
| | Autograph | Host | Tamil | Jaya TV | |
| | Weekend with Stars | Host | Tamil | Zee Tamil TV | |
| | Ninaivu Kurippugal | Host | Tamil | DD Podhigai | |
| 2020 | Bigg Boss 4 | Herself | Tamil | Star Vijay | Guest |
| 2022 | Modern Love Hyderabad | Gangamma | Telugu | Amazon Prime Video | |
| 2024 | Jai Mahendran | Shobha | Malayalam | Sony LIV | |
| 2024 | Soul Stories | Rani | Malayalam | Manorama Max | |
| 2024 | Nayanthara: Beyond the Fairytale | Herself | English | Netflix | Documentary film |

=== Dubbing artist ===
| Year | Title | Actress | Role | Notes |
|---|---|---|---|---|
| 1991 | Thalapathi | Shobhana | | |
| 1993 | Thiruda Thiruda | Heera Rajagopal | | |
| 1997 | Iddaru | Tabu | | Telugu dubbed version |
| 1998 | Uyire | Manisha Koirala | | Tamil dubbed version |
