= Male Nilluvavarege =

2015 Kannada-language Indian film

- Directed by: Mohan Shankar
- Written by: Mohan Shankar
- Produced by: Mohan Shankar
- Starring: Mohan Shankar
- Cinematography: D Prasad Babu
- Music by: Layendra Kokila
- Release date: 17 April 2015
- Country: India
- Language: Kannada

Male Nilluvavarege (transl. 'Until the rain stops') is a 2015 Indian Kannada film directed by Mohan Shankar and starring himself. The movie is based on a Kannada play by L.N.Sudheendra which was an adaptation of the 1960 English play The Deadly Game which in turn was based on the 1956 German novel A Dangerous Game by Swiss writer Friedrich Dürrenmatt.

== Cast ==
- Mohan Shankar as Mohan
- Kavitha Bohra as Isha
- H. G. Dattatreya as Peter
- Sharath Lohitashwa as Rachaiah
- Srinivas Prabhu as Ramaiah
- Kari Subbu as Pandu
- M. N. Lakshmi Devi
- Bhumika
- Soujanya

== Reception ==
A critic from The Times of India wrote that "It’s a one-man show by Mohan who plays his role to perfection. Dattatreya, Sharath Lohithahwa, Kari Subbu and Srinivasa Prabhu have done their bit". A critic from The Hindu opined that "The audience needs to have lot of patience to watch Male Nilluvavarege, with a tag line Beware of Rain, as it is dialogue driven thriller drama woven around an incident that takes place in one night".
