= Shantata! Court Chalu Aahe =

Indian Marathi-language play

- Original language: Marathi

Premiere
- Place: India

Shantata! Court Chalu Aahe (Silence! The Court Is in Session) is a Marathi play written by Indian playwright Vijay Tendulkar in 1963 and first performed in 1967, directed by Arvind Deshpande, with Sulbha Deshpande as the main lead. Film received National Film Award for Best Marathi Feature Film At 19th National Film Awards. Sulabha Deshpande Won Maharashtra State Film Award for Best Actress.

The play was written in 1963, for Rangayan, a Mumbai-based theatre group, though it was performed much later. It was inspired after the playwright overheard the conversation amongst the members of amateur theatre group traveling on Mumbai local train to perform a mock-trial at Vile Parle suburb. The play was based on a 1956 novel, Die Panne (Traps) by Swiss playwright Friedrich Dürrenmatt.

== Translations ==
The play has since been translated into 16 languages in India and abroad. The BBC showed its English version, filmed by Satyadev Dubey. Actor-director, Om Shivpuri, directed the Hindi translation of the play as Khamosh! Adaalat Jaari Hai. The play had his wife Sudha Shivpuri in the lead role and is regarded as a key milestone in the history of Indian Theatre.

== Plot ==
A group of teachers plan to stage a play in a village. When a cast-member does not show up, a local stagehand is asked to replace him. An improvised, free-flowing 'rehearsal' is arranged and a mock trial is staged to make the novice understand court procedures. A (mock) charge of infanticide is leveled against Miss Benare, another cast-member.

All of a sudden, the pretend-play turns into an accusatory game when it emerges from the trial that Miss Benare is carrying an out-of-wedlock child from her failed illicit relationship with Professor Damle, the missing cast-member.

== Critical acclaim ==
Its playwright, Vijay Tendulkar, got national recognition in the form of the Kamaladevi Chattopadhyay Award for drama in 1970 and Sangeet Natak Akademi Award (National Academy of Music, Dance and Drama) in 1970 for playwriting.

== Adaptations ==
Noted Marathi playwright and stage director Satyadev Dubey directed a Marathi film based on the play, with the same name in 1971. Shantata! Court Chalu Aahe started the New Cinema movement in Marathi cinema and is considered one of India’s finest films.

It marked the debut of actors Amrish Puri and Amol Palekar, and of Govind Nihalani for whom this was his first film as a full-fledged cinematographer; till then, he had worked an assistant to Guru Dutt’s cinematographer V.K. Murthy. Govind Nihalani co-produced the film with Satyadev Dubey. This was Vijay Tendulkar's first screenplay, who went on to write films like Nishant, Aakrosh, Ardh Satya and Umbartha.

Indian film director Ritesh Menon adapted the play into a Hindi-language film titled (after the name of the play's Hindi translation) Khamosh Adalat Jaari Hai in 2017.

=== Film cast ===
- Arvind Deshpande
- Sulbha Deshpande as Leela Benare
- Amrish Puri
- Amol Palekar
- Eknath Hattagadi
