= Nizhalgal Ravi filmography =

Nizhalgal Ravi is an Indian actor who works mainly in Tamil cinema and has performed in predominantly Tamil, Telugu and Malayalam films apart from some Kannada and Hindi films. He started his career in 1980 with the Tamil film Nizhalgal. He has acted in 590 films.

== Films ==
=== Tamil films ===
==== 1980s ====
Year	Title	Role	Notes
1978	Sadhurangam	Tenant	Uncredited role
1980	Nizhalgal	Gopi	
1981	Aradhanai		
1981	Kadal Meengal	Ravi	
1981	Thodarum Charithirangal		
1982	Manjal Nila	Gopi	
1982	Thaai Mookaambikai	Sarangan	
1982	Ninaivellam Nithya	Thyagu	
1982	Oorum Uravum	Pounraj	
1983	Kal Vadiyum Pookal		
1983	Mann Vasanai	School Teacher	
1983	Saatchi		
1984	Thambikku Entha Ooru	Chandran	
1984	Raja Veettu Kannukkutty		
1984	Niraparaadhi	Jayaprakash	
1984	Nerupukkul Eeram		
1984	Vaazhkai	Bhaskar	
1984	Sanga Natham		
1984	Idhu Enga Boomi		
1984	Osai		
1985	Saavi	Anand	
1985	Anni		
1985	Bandham	Thomas	
1985	Mannukketha Ponnu	Military	Guest Appearance
1985	Paadum Vaanampadi	Shyam	
1985	Naan Sigappu Manithan	Ravi	
1985	Unnai Thedi Varuven		
1985	Vilangu Meen	Ranjith	
1985	Pagal Nilavu	Devarajan's assistant	
1985	Sri Raghavendrar	Venkanna	
1985	Pournami Alaigal	Inspector Lawrence	
1985	Uthami	Paranthaman	
1985	Sugamana Raagangal		
1985	Yaar?	V. V. Janardhan	
1985	Kaamaakshi		
1985	Yemaatrathe Yemaaraathe		
1985	Thiramai		
1985	Needhiyin Nizhal	James	
1986	December Pookal	Inspector Vinoth	
1986	Lakshmi Vandhachu	Raja	
1986	Anandha Kanneer	Rajarama Iyer	
1986	Marakka Matten	Raja	
1986	Thaaiku Oru Thaalaattu	Rajasekar's oldest son	
1986	Isai Paadum Thendral		
1986	Raja Nee Vazhga		
1986	Panneer Nadhigal		
1987	Kizhakku Africavil Sheela	Ramu	
1987	Poovizhi Vasalile	Ravi	
1987	Makkal En Pakkam	Michael	
1987	Ore Oru Gramathiley		
1987	Velicham		
1987	Thangachi	Prakash	
1987	Ullam Kavarntha Kalvan		
1987	Chinna Thambi Periya Thambi	Murali	
1987	Vilangu	Vinod	
1987	Thirumathi Oru Vegumathi	Namachivayam	
1987	Neethikku Thandanai	Doctor	
1987	Nayakan	Surya	
1987	Vedham Pudhithu	Forest ranger	
1988	Makkal Aanaiyittal	Lawyer Mohan / Bharathan	
1988	Sudhanthira Naattin Adimaigal		
1988	Soora Samhaaram	Arun	
1988	Raththa Dhanam		
1988	En Thamizh En Makkal		
1988	Thambi Thanga Kambi	Chinna Durai	
1988	Jeeva	Anand	
1988	Ithu Engal Neethi		
1988	Kadarkarai Thaagam		
1989	Enga Veetu Deivam		
1989	Kuttravali		
1989	Sattathin Thirappu Vizhaa	Gandhi Raman	
1989	Vettaiyaadu Vilaiyaadu		
1989	Thendral Sudum	Anand	
1989	Dharma Devan		
1989	Oru Thottil Sabadham		
1989	Thendral Puyalanadhu		
1989	Kaval Poonaigal		
1989	Padicha Pulla		
1989	Idhaya Deepam		
1989	Paasakanal		
1989	Mappillai	Ravi	
1989	Manasukketha Maharasa		
1989	Uthama Purushan	Rekha's husband	
1989	Nyaya Tharasu	Thazhamuthu	

==== 1990s ====
Year	Title	Role	Notes
1990	Aadi Velli		
1990	Neengalum Herothan	Tiger' Premnath	
1990	Pathimoonam Number Veedu	Selvam	
1990	Andhi Varum Neram		
1990	Pattanamthan Pogalamadi	Muthaiya	
1990	Satyam Sivam Sundaram		
1990	Durga	Muthu	
1990	My Dear Marthandan	Pankaj	
1990	Engitta Mothathay		
1990	Aalay Pathu Malai Mathu		
1990	Amman Kovil Thiruvizha		
1990	Idhaya Thamarai	Ranjith	
1990	Adhisaya Manithan	Police Inspector	
1990	Puthu Paatu		Special appearance
1990	Nee Sirithal Deepavali		
1990	Thiyagu	Nana	
1991	Sigaram	Gnanam	
1991	Dharma Durai	Ramadurai	
1991	Naan Pudicha Mappillai	Muthuraj	
1991	Rasathi Varum Naal	Inspector Vijay	
1991	Namma Ooru Mariamma	Muthu	
1991	Idhaya Oonjal		
1991	Apoorva Nagam		
1991	Onnum Theriyatha Pappa		
1991	Paattondru Ketten		
1991	Vaasalile Oru Vennila		
1991	Aadi Viradham		
1992	Ilavarasan	Selvanayagam	
1992	Agni Paarvai	MLA Inbasekharan	
1992	Matha Gomatha		
1992	Unna Nenachen Pattu Padichen	Periyasamy	
1992	Singaravelan	"Sincere" Sivamani	
1992	Annaamalai	Sarkunam	
1992	Kalikaalam	Raghuraman	
1992	Thambi Pondatti	Balu	
1992	Sivashankari	Ganesan	
1992	Brahmachari	Ganesan	
1992	Neenga Nalla Irukkanum	Manickam	
1992	Thilagam		
1993	Pudhu Piravi		
1993	Uzhaippali	Gajapathy	
1993	Amaravathi	Rathnavel	
1993	Moondravadhu Kann	Sabapathy	
1993	Marupadiyum	Muralikrishna	
1993	Pathini Penn	Prabhu	
1994	Maindhan	Ponrasu	
1994	Purushanai Kaikkulla Pottukkanum		
1994	Honest Raj	Kesavan	
1994	Priyanka	Ravi	
1994	Seevalaperi Pandi	Ravi	
1994	Vanaja Girija	Shankar	
1994	Veera Padhakkam		
1995	Kattumarakaran	Muthazhagu's brother-in-law	
1995	Gangai Karai Paattu	Arjun Singh	
1995	Aasai	Lt. Col Hariharan	
1995	Chinna Vathiyar	Baba	
1995	Naan Petha Magane	Ravi	
1995	Witness	Vikram	
1995	Chakravarthy	Boopathy	
1995	Kolangal	Ganga's brother-in-law	
1995	Kuruthipunal	Criminal	
1995	Ilaya Ragam		
1996	Vetri Vinayagar	Parthiban	
1996	Meendum Savithri	Narasimman	
1996	Indian	Corrupt Doctor	
1996	Mettukudi		Guest appearance
1996	Sivasakthi	Anbu	
1996	Thirumbi Paar	Karnal Raja	Guest appearance
1996	Alexander	Gandhirajan	
1997	Sakthi	Sethupathi	
1997	Iruvar	Ramani's uncle	
1997	Kathirunda Kadhal		
1997	Mappillai Gounder		
1997	Arunachalam	Prathap	
1997	Parama Pithaa		
1997	Vallal	Kalingarayan	
1997	Sishya	C.B.I Ashok Narayanan	
1997	Pasamulla Pandiyare	Nagaraja	
1997	Suryavamsam	Thangarasu	
1997	Periya Manushan	Indhu's cousin	
1998	Ponmanam	Poornima's boss	
1998	Bhagavath Singh		
1998	Pooveli	Chidambaram's Brother	
1999	Ponnu Veetukkaran	Groom	
1999	Endrendrum Kadhal	Nagaraj	
1999	Nilave Mugam Kaattu	Prakash's father	
1999	Poomagal Oorvalam	Boopathy	
1999	Nenjinile	Karunakaran's father	
1999	Rojavanam		
1999	Kannodu Kanbathellam	Thangarajan	
1999	Jodi	Sadagoppan	Guest appearance
1999	Suryodayam	Kaladharan	
1999	Maanaseega Kadhal		

==== 2000s ====
Year	Title	Role	Notes
2000	Mugavaree	Dhurai's father	
2000	Rajakaali Amman	Guru	
2000	Kandukondain Kandukondain	Swaminathan	
2000	Kushi	Shiva's father	
2000	Puthira Punithama		
2000	Kannaal Pesavaa	Doctor	
2000	Budget Padmanabhan	Seth	
2000	James Pandu	Chit Fund Company Owner	
2000	Bharathi	S. P. Y. Surendranath Arya	
2001	Nageswari		
2001	Piriyadha Varam Vendum	Vishwanathan	
2001	Sri Raja Rajeshwari	Businessman Ravintharnath	
2001	Citizen	Collector Santhanam	
2001	Dosth	Police inspector	
2001	Star	Sundaram	
2001	Lovely	Chandru's father	
2001	Thavasi	Rajadurai	
2001	Shahjahan	Ashok's father	
2001	Paarthale Paravasam	Mudaliar	
2001	Aandan Adimai		
2001	Kottai Mariamman	Durga's father	
2002	Red	Anand	
2002	Alli Arjuna	Savithri's father	
2002	Punnagai Desam	Raja's father	
2002	Thulluvadho Ilamai	Vishnu's father	
2002	Enge Enadhu Kavithai	Rangarajan	
2002	Padai Veetu Amman	Rathna's father	
2002	Pesadha Kannum Pesume	Vikram's Father	
2002	Ivan	Kathiresan	
2002	Album	Viji's uncle	
2002	Villain	Shiva and Vishnu's father	
2003	Vaseegara	Chandrasekhar	
2003	Military	Professor	
2003	Manasellam	Malar's elder brother	
2003	Jayam	Raghu's father	
2003	Alai	Meera's father	
2003	Anjaneya	Education officer	
2003	Thirumalai	Arasu's henchman	
2003	Thathi Thavadhu Manasu		
2004	Varnajalam	Shakthivel's brother-in-law	
2004	Adi Thadi		
2004	Gajendra	Azhagarsamy' second son-in-law	
2004	Attahasam	Guru and Jeeva's father	
2004	Amma Appa Chellam	Nanditha's father	
2004	Jananam	Chandrasekhar	
2005	Ayya	Ramadurai	
2005	Jathi	Deena Dayalan	
2005	Pesuvoma	Muthupandi	
2005	Oru Naal Oru Kanavu		
2005	Oru Kalluriyin Kathai		
2005	Thirudiya Idhayathai		
2005	Aaru	Sundaram	
2006	Saravana	Saravana's uncle	
2006	Amirtham	Police Inspector	
2006	Madhu		
2006	Kalabha Kadhalan		
2006	Thodamale		
2006	Nee Venunda Chellam	Kannan's father	
2006	Thalaimagan	Meghala's father	
2006	Thimiru	Principal	
2006	Desiya Paravai		
2007	Tholaipesi		
2007	Thaamirabharani	Thangapaandi	
2007	Thiru Ranga	Ranga's father	
2007	Cheena Thaana 001	Vijayaraghavan IPS	
2007	Sivi		
2008	Nenjathai Killadhe	Psychiatrist	
2008	Vambu Sandai	Prabhakaran's foster father	
2008	Madurai Ponnu Chennai Paiyan	Balan	
2008	Jayamkondaan	Durai Raj	
2008	Dhaam Dhoom	Gautham's father	
2008	Kuselan	Himself	Special appearance
2008	Theeyavan	Ravi	
2008	Sakkarakatti	Yuvaraj's father	
2009	Kudiyarasu	Rajasekar	
2009	Indira Vizha		
2009	Pinju Manasu	Devi's father	
2009	Mariyadhai	Viswanathan	
2009	Manjal Veiyil	Gayathri's father	
2009	Kanden Kadhalai	Ramana	
2009	Madhavi	Nandha and Mahesh's father	
2009	Thambivudayaan		
2009	Kanna Nee Enakkuthanda		
2009	Adhe Neram Adhe Idam	Karthik's father	

==== 2010s ====
Year	Title	Role	Notes
2010	Thambikku Indha Ooru	Rajasekhar	
2010	Azhagana Ponnuthan	Karthik's father	
2010	Maanja Velu	Anjali's father	
2010	Singam	ACP Rajendran	
2010	Indrasena		
2010	Pournami Nagam	Honey's father	
2010	Mandabam	Sathya	
2010	Mudhal Kadhal Mazhai		
2011	Ilaignan		
2011	Kaavalan	Parthasarathy	
2011	Aadu Puli		
2011	Kumara		
2011	Varmam	Chidambaram	
2011	Venghai	Manickavel	
2011	Markandeyan		
2011	Vaada Poda Nanbargal		
2011	Kadaisivarai Thamilan		
2011	Ninaivil Nindra Malar		
2011	Uyir Nanaikirathe		
2011	Mudhal Kadhal Mazhai		
2011	Osthe	Thangam Perumaal	
2012	Agam Ariya Aaval		
2012	Soozhnilai		500th Film
2012	Suzhal	Lakshmipathi	
2013	Vanakkam Chennai	Rajamohan	
2013	Manithanaha Iru		
2013	Singam II	ACP Rajendran	
2013	Kaadhale Ennai Kaadhali	Ram	
2013	Kandanam		
2013	Thee Kulikkum Pachai Maram		
2013	Sandhithathum Sindhithathum		
2013	Pesamal Pesinaal		
2013	Bhuvanakkadu		
2014	Andavaa Kappathu		
2014	Ramanujan	Srinivasa Raghavan	
2014	Hogenakkal		
2014	Theriyama Unna Kadhalichitten		
2014	Manam Konda Kaadhal		
2014	Lingaa	Zamindar of Rayakottai	
2015	Pulan Visaranai 2	Govt Advocate	
2015	Maha Maha	Mohan	
2015	Katham Katham	SP Ravichandran	
2015	9 Thirudargal		
2015	Andhadhi	Nyanasekhar	
2015	Muthukumar Wanted	Anandhi's father	
2016	Narathan	Vishnu's father	
2016	Ennam Pudhu Vannam		
2016	Unnai Partha Naal		
2016	Andha Maan		
2017	Ilavatta Pasanga		
2017	Veera Vamsam		
2017	Vadasatti		
2017	Sathya	Swetha's father	
2017	Pagadi Aattam	Karthikeyan	
2018	Tamizh Padam 2	Inbasekhar	
2018	Pakka	Nadhiya's father	
2018	Ratsasan	Dr. Nandan	
2018	Diya	Krishna's father	
2018	Roja Maaligai		
2018	Moondru Rasigarkal		
2019	Unmaiyen Velicham		
2019	Thiruttukkalyanam		
2019	NGK	Ramanan	

==== 2020s ====
Year	Title	Role	Notes
2020	Hawala		
2021	Calls	Nandhini's Manager	
2021	Dikkiloona	Mental Hospital Patient	
2021	Erida		
2022	Cadaver	Dr. Abraham Abel	
2022	John Ahiya Naan	Doctor	
2022	Ponniyin Selvan: I	Kadambur Sambuvurayar	
2023	Jambu Maharishi		
2023	Ponniyin Selvan: II	Kadambur Sambuvurayar	
2023	Por Thozhil	D. Mahendran	
2023	Mark Antony	Advocate Selvam	
2023	Raththam	Rathna Pandian	
2023	A Home Away from Home		
2023	Sooragan	Varadharajan	
2023	Nandhi Varman	Chakravarthi	
2024	Vadakkupatti Ramasamy	Major Chandrakanth	
2024	Vaa Pagandaya		
2024	Finder Project 1	Dhayalan	
2024	Iravin Vizhigal	Ravi	
2025	Seesaw	Police commissioner	
2025	Baby and Baby	Dayalan	
2025	Aghathiyaa	Umar Abdulla	
2025	Asthram	Rudhran	
2025	Sumo	Kani's father	
2025	Devil's Double Next Level	Captain Mc Donald & Auto Basker, Kissa's father	
2025	School	Mastaan	
2025	Jinn - The Pet		
2025	Iravu Paravai		
2025	Kuttram Pudhithu		
2025	Padaiyaanda Maaveeraa	IPS. Thiruvasagam	
2025	Thanthra		
2025	Kaantha	Sivalingam Mudaliar	
2025	Iravin Vizhigal		
2025	Unpaarvaiyil	Michael Raj	
2026	Justice for Jeni	Advocate	
2026	Anantha	Vasudevan	
2026	Vaa Vaathiyaar	Chief Minister of Tamil Nadu	
2026	Thiraivi		
2026	Anthony	Rev. Church Father	
2026	Nee Forever		
2026	Jana Nayagan	Narayan	
2026	Photographer	Dr. Shantaram	
2026	Sardar 2	Agent "Shadow" Ravi	
2026	The Dark Heaven		
2026	Black Gold	President of the Lorry Owners Association	

=== Telugu films ===
Year	Title	Role	Notes
1986	Sravana Sandhya	Prabhu	
1987	Gowtami		
1988	Inspector Pratap	Ramki	
1990	Alludugaru	Gopal	
1991	Chaitanya	Smuggler	
1991	Jaitra Yatra		
1992	Gowramma		
1993	Nippu Ravva	Engineer	
1994	Allarodu	Naidu	
1995	Drohi	Criminal	
1995	Guntur Gundamma Katha		
1996	Neti Savithri	Narasimman	
1997	Pattukondi Chuddam	BP Srinivas Rao	
2008	Kathanayakudu	Himself	Special appearance
2008	Terror		
2008	Andamaina Abaddam		
2009	Punnami Naagu	Honey's father	
2011	Killer		
2012	Uu Kodathara? Ulikki Padathara?	Manoj's father	
2012	Nuvvekkadunte Nenakkadunta		
2014	Life After Death		
2017	Juliet Lover of Idiot	Vara's father	
2018	Kanam	Krishna's father	
2025	Divya Drusthi		

=== Malayalam films ===
- Note: He was credited in Malayalam as Kakka Ravi from 1986 to 1996.

Year	Title	Role	Notes
1982	Kakka		
1986	Meenamaasathile Sooryan	Kunjambu Nair	
1987	Jaithra Yaathra		
1987	Idanazhiyil Oru Kaalocha		
1987	Veendum Lisa	Kalyan	Dubbed in Tamil as My Dear Lisa
1990	Mouna Daaham		
1991	Aavanikunnile Kinnaripookkal	Raju	
1993	Ithu Manjukaalam		
1993	City Police	Sajan Mathew	
1994	The City	Sudhakaran	
1994	Saraamsham		
1996	The Prince		
2011	Melvilasom	Major Ajay Suri	credited as Nizhalkal Ravi
2013	Romans	C. I. Vetrimaran	
2014	Happy Journey		
2014	Little Superman	Albert	
2017	Mayaanadhi	Police Inspector	
2018	Vikadakumaran	Tamil Nadu Police Superintendent	
2021	Erida	Uncle	
2024	Kishkindha Kaandam	Dr. Amrith Lal	

=== Kannada films ===
Year	Title	Role	Notes
1986	Africadalli Sheela	Naghuba	
1997	Zindabad		
1998	Nishyabda	Vikram Gowda	
1998	Simhada Guri		
1998	Government		
2005	Love Story		Dubbed in Tamil as Uyir Ullavare

=== Hindi films ===
Year	Title	Role	Notes
1994	Janta Ki Adalat	DIG Kiran Kumar	
1998	Zulm-O-Sitam		Special appearance; Dubbed in Tamil as Arjuna
2013	Gori Tere Pyaar Mein	Sriram Venkat's father	

== Television ==
Year	Serial	Role	Channel	Language
	Appavukkaaga		Doordarshan	Tamil
1986	Nallador Veenai		Doordarshan	Tamil
1991	Rail Sneham		Doordarshan	Tamil
1995–1996	Rathri		ETV	Telugu
1996	Ivala En Manaivi	Bhaskar	Doordarshan	Tamil
1996	Doctor Dharani		Doordarshan	Tamil
1996	Kaveri		Doordarshan	Tamil
1998–2000	Idhi Katha Kadu		ETV	Telugu
1998–1999	Velagu Needalu		ETV	Telugu
1999	Kasalavu Nesam		Sun TV / Raj TV	Tamil
2001–2002	Marumagal		Vijay TV	Tamil
2001–2003	Alaigal	Eswaramoorthy	Sun TV	Tamil
2002–2004	Ninne Pelladatha	Vittal Prasad	Gemini TV	Telugu
2005–2006	Deerga Sumangali		Sun TV	Tamil
2005	Aparajitha		Gemini TV	Telugu
2008	Emergency Action		Doordarshan	Tamil
2009–2010	Thendral	Velayudham	Sun TV	Tamil
2012–2014	Suryaputhri		Kalaignar TV	Tamil
2014–2017	Nambinaal Nambungal	Host	Zee Tamil	Tamil
2018–2020	Lahiri Lahiri Lahirilo	Devaraj	ETV	Telugu
2019–2020	Run	Dr. Radhakrishnan (RK)	Sun TV	Tamil
2020–2021	Chithi 2	Shanmugapriyan	Sun TV	Tamil
2021	Thirumagal	Shanmugapriyan (Special Appearance)	Sun TV	Tamil
2022–2023	Vantalakka	Ramakotayya	Star Maa	Telugu

=== Web series ===
Year	Serial	Role	Channel	Language
2020	The Forgotten Army - Azaadi Ke Liye	Maya's father	Amazon Prime Video	Hindi
2020	Breathe: Into the Shadows	Principal Krishnan Moorthy	Amazon Prime Video	Hindi
2022	Irai	Subbaraj	Aha Tamil	Tamil

== As dubbing artist ==
In the Tamil speaking community, the program "KBC" got huge reception, due to the dubbing voice performed by Nizhalgal Ravi.

Films

Year	Films	Actor	Notes
1989	Pudhu Pudhu Arthangal	Rahman	
1993	Captain Magal	Raja	
2008	Bommalattam	Nana Patekar	Dubbed film
2015	Yagavarayinum Naa Kaakka	Mithun Chakraborty	
2018	K.G.F: Chapter 1	Anant Nag	Tamil version only
2018	Thugs of Hindustan	Amitabh Bachchan	Tamil version only
2019	Kaappaan	Boman Irani	
2019	Sye Raa Narasimha Reddy	Amitabh Bachchan	Tamil version only
2019	Bigil	Jackie Shroff	
2019	Aladdin	Navid Negahban	Tamil version only

Serials

Year	Films	Actors	Notes
1995	Chinna Chinna Aasaigal - Judgement	Prakash Raj	
2005	Kaun Banega Crorepati - Season 2	Amitabh Bachchan	Tamil version only
