= Muddina Maava =

- VCD cover
- Directed by: Om Sai Prakash
- Story by: V. Sekhar
- Based on: Naan Pudicha Mappillai (Tamil)
- Produced by: K. Prabhakar
- Starring: Shashi Kumar; Shruti; S. P. Balasubrahmanyam; Tara; Dwarakish; Doddanna
- Music by: S. P. Balasubrahmanyam
- Distributed by: Shreedevi Combines
- Release date: 1993
- Running time: 145 minutes
- Country: India
- Language: Kannada

Muddina Maava (English Translation: Beloved father-in-law) is a 1993 Indian Kannada language film starring Shashi Kumar, Shruti, S. P. Balasubrahmanyam and Tara. The film is a remake of the Tamil film Naan Pudicha Mappillai.

== Cast ==
- Shashi Kumar
- Shruti as Lakshmi
- S. P. Balasubrahmanyam as Ramaiah, Lakshmi's father
- Tara
- Doddanna as Vishakantaiah
- Dwarakish
- Girija Lokesh
- M. N. Lakshmi Devi

== Soundtrack ==
The film's soundtrack was composed by S. P. Balasubrahmanyam and lyrics were penned by Hamsalekha. Rajkumar sang a song "Deepavali" for which Balasubramaniam performed onscreen.

| Track# | Song | Singer(s) | Duration |
|---|---|---|---|
| 1 | "Aaradhane" | S. P. Balasubrahmanyam, K. S. Chithra | |
| 2 | "Deepavali Deepavali" | Dr. Rajkumar, S. P. Balasubrahmanyam, Manjula Gururaj | |
| 3 | "Premakke" | Manjula Gururaj | |
| 4 | "Shivane" | Dr. Rajkumar | |
| 5 | "Varane Maduve Maduve" | S. P. Balasubrahmanyam, K. S. Chithra | |
