= Varavu Ettana Selavu Pathana =

- Poster
- Directed by: V. Sekhar
- Written by: V. Sekhar
- Produced by: C. Kannappan; S. S. Durairaju; S. Tamilselvi; R. Vijay; S. Jayalakshmi
- Starring: Nassar; Radhika
- Cinematography: G. Rajendran
- Edited by: A. P. Manivannan
- Music by: Chandrabose
- Production company: Thiruvalluvar Kalaikoodam
- Release date: 14 April 1994
- Running time: 155 minutes
- Country: India
- Language: Tamil

Varavu Ettana Selavu Pathana (transl. Income is eight annas, expense is ten annas) is a 1994 Indian Tamil-language comedy drama film directed by V. Sekhar. The film stars Nassar and Radhika, while Jaishankar, Goundamani, Senthil, Vadivelu, Kovai Sarala, and Vinu Chakravarthy play supporting roles. It was released on 14 April 1994. The film was later remade in Telugu as Aasthi Mooredu Aasha Baaredu (1995) and in Kannada by same director as Hendtheer Darbar (2010).

== Plot ==
Sivaraman, an honest government clerk, and his wife Lakshmi belong to a middle-class family and have two children. "Anjaadha Singam" Marudhapaandi, a corrupt politician, moves into a new house near Sivaraman's house. Marudhapaandi's lifestyle influences Lakshmi, and she tries to ape him by buying luxurious items on installments. This puts pressure on Sivaraman, who takes a loan from his office peon, but the police arrests him for corruption. He later finds a job in a brandy company with Marudhapaandi's recommendation.

== Cast ==
- Nassar as Sivaraman
- Radhika as Lakshmi
- Jaishankar as Valluvardasan
- Goundamani as Anjatha Singam Marudhapaandi
- Senthil as Rahim
- Vadivelu as Peter
- Kovai Sarala as Elisabeth
- Vinu Chakravarthy as MLA
- Monica as Padma, Sivaraman's daughter
- Master Sirajudeen as Sivaraman's son
- Y. Vijaya as Marudhapaandi's wife
- Suryakanth as Marudhapaandi's sidekick
- Oru Viral Krishna Rao as House owner
- Shanmugasundari as House owner's wife
- LIC Narasimhan as Vigilante Officer

== Soundtrack ==
The soundtrack was composed by Chandrabose, with lyrics written by Vaali.

Song	Singer	Duration
"Sonnan Antha"	Swarnalatha, K. S. Chithra, T.L.Thiyagarajan, Vairamani, Chandra Bose	4:01
"Aasa Machan"	S. Janaki	3:44
"Santhosam"	S. Janaki	3:05
"Yerathu Sarakku"	Malaysia Vasudevan	3:16
"Papera Pathiya"	Chandrabose	3:55

== Reception ==
MM of The Indian Express wrote, "A clean family entertainer with Sekhar depending on sound script and deftness in handling it". K. Vijiyan of New Straits Times wrote "This one is for those couples who seem forever stuck in cycle of debts". R. P. R. of Kalki wrote it is a subject suitable for all kinds of audiences; Since Sekhar directed this film it is a same old formula with too many sentiments and teachings.
