= Veettoda Mappillai =

2001 film

- Title card
- Directed by: V. Sekhar
- Written by: V. Sekhar
- Produced by: S. S. Durai Raju; K. Parthiban
- Starring: Napoleon; Roja
- Cinematography: P. S. Selvam
- Edited by: A. P. Manivannan
- Music by: Deva
- Production company: Thiruvalluvar Kalaikoodam
- Release date: 14 September 2001
- Running time: 140 minutes
- Country: India
- Language: Tamil

Veettoda Mappillai (transl. "Son-in-law who lives in his wife's house") is a 2001 Indian Tamil language comedy drama film written and directed by V. Sekhar. The film stars Napoleon and Roja, while Vijayakumar, Kalpana, Kovai Sarala, Charle, Vaiyapuri, and Thalaivasal Vijay play supporting roles. It was released on 14 September 2001.

== Plot ==
Kandasamy, a restaurant owner, has a son, Muthupandi, and three daughters, Jamuna, Rani, and Meena. Muthupandi had fought with his father when he was young, cut Kandasamy's hand with a knife, and ran away to Mumbai with 2 lakh rupees. Kandasamy marries off Jamuna and Rani to distant relatives Ganga and Dhamu, who are jobless and lazy. They spend lavishly and irresponsibly, taking money from the restaurant without Kandasamy's knowledge. Jamuna and Rani support their husbands' wrongdoings, unable to confront them.

Kandasamy hires Manickam, a jobless young graduate, to supervise the restaurant. Manickam works sincerely, introducing catering ideas to boost profits. Ganga and Dhamu, envious of Manickam, hire goons to chase him out, but Manickam beats them both. Meena develops feelings for Manickam, impressed by his innocence and bravery. Kandasamy too decides to marry Meena to Manickam and asks him to stay with him after marriage. Initially, Manickam refuses, but his mother's persuasion makes him accept. They get married and move into Kandasamy's house.

On the first night of their marriage, co-brothers Ganga and Dhamu create a ruckus, demanding their rooms back, leading to a fight between Kandasamy and his sons-in-law. Jamuna and Rani are impressed by Manickam's behavior, unlike their husbands'. Ganga and Dhamu start a chit company, selling their scooters for ₹40,000 (equivalent to ₹160,000 or US$1,900 in 2023) and convincing their wives to sell their jewels for another ₹60,000 (equivalent to ₹240,000 or US$2,800 in 2023). They spend the money lavishly, expecting interest from a film producer. However, the producer delays repayment, leaving Ganga and Dhamu bankrupt and unable to repay the public's money. The enraged public attacks Ganga and Dhamu, but Kandasamy and Manickam intervene. Manickam uses his personal savings to repay the debt, but it's insufficient. Kandasamy decides to pawn the jewels, only to learn they've already been sold. In anger, he chases Ganga and Dhamu out of the house.

They seek help from constable Meesai Muruganandam to re-enter the house and claim their share of the property. However, they spot the goons they hired to attack Manickam at the police station and flee. While escaping, Ganga and Dhamu bump into Muthupandi, now a rich hotel owner in Mumbai, who has returned with his family. They brainwash Muthupandi against Manickam, to take over the restaurant and to drive Meena and Manickam out. Muthupandi opposes Manickam's plan to start a sweetshop nearby. His wife Sonia advises him to support Manickam and Meena, but he's too proud to listen. Ganga and Dhamu humiliate Manickam, lying to Muthupandi that Manickam beat them, leading him to shout at Manickam.

Muthupandi emotionally manipulates Kandasamy, threatening to leave if he prioritizes Manickam over him. This sparks an argument between Meena and Kandasamy, revealing his preference for a male heir. Humiliated, Meena and Manickam move out. Manickam gets a loan and opens a restaurant and grocery shop opposite Kandasamy's, at Meena's insistence. Muthupandi brainwashes Kandasamy against Manickam, making him pawn their home for ₹1,000,000 (equivalent to ₹4.0 million or US$47,000 in 2023). Muthupandi uses the money to transform his father's restaurant into a bar cum club, while Kandasamy has gone on a religious trip. Ganga and Dhamu fight with their wives, leading to Muthupandi slapping Meena. Manickam retaliates by slapping Muthupandi.

Muthupandi's former henchmen blackmail him for 10 lakhs, revealing a murder at his Mumbai club in the past. Ganga and Dhamu bring escort women, but their wives chase them away. Inebriated, Muthupandi reveals his business losses and the murder to Ganga and Dhamu, who humiliate him. Muthupandi threatens and brutally beats Ganga and Dhamu, but Manickam tries to intervene. Meena stops him, citing past humiliations. However, Muthupandi attacks Manickam, who retaliates strongly. The women intervene, stopping the fight.

Kandasamy returns, learning about the club and his daughters' departure. He confronts Muthupandi, leading to an argument, and gets thrown out. Humiliated, Kandasamy attempts suicide, but his daughters and sons-in-law rescue him. Muthupandi's henchmen beat him, taking him hostage for the lump sum. Manickam rushes to save him, and the three sons-in-law, along with hotel workers, fight off the henchmen. Completely reformed, Muthupandi apologizes to Kandasamy and Manickam. Kandasamy also apologizes to Manickam and Meena, and they finally reunite.

== Cast ==
- Napoleon as Manickam
- Roja as Meena
- Vijayakumar as Kandasamy
- Kalpana as Jamuna
- Kovai Sarala as Rani
- Charle as Ganga
- Vaiyapuri as Dhamu
- Thalaivasal Vijay as Muthupandi
- Shanmugasundari as Manickam's mother
- Bonda Mani as Mani, hotel waiter
- Sonia as Sonia, Muthupandi's wife
- Kumarimuthu as Muthu, hotel chef
- Bayilvan Ranganathan as a goon
- Suryakanth as a goon
- Thyagu as Meesai Muruganandam, constable
- K. Rajan as a producer
- MLA Thangaraj as Annachi, financier
- Thideer Kannaiah as a laundryman

== Soundtrack ==
The music was composed by Deva.

Song	Singer(s)	Lyrics	Duration
"Ayira Meena"	Jayalakshmi, Krishnaraj, Sabesan	Kalidasan	5:24
"Mannukketha Machane"	S. P. Balasubrahmanyam, K. S. Chithra	Arivumathi	5:39
"Mapillaiyae"	Krishnaraj	Arivumathi	5:03
"Pombalai Enna Ambalai"	K. S. Chithra, Krishnaraj, Sabesan	Muthulingam	4:35
"Vaada Malare Vaada"	S. P. Balasubrahmanyam, K. S. Chithra	Muthulingam	5:06

== Reception ==
S. R. Ashok Kumar of The Hindu said : "too much of dialogue it makes the viewer restless at times". Malini Mannath of Chennai Online felt the film "is only the pale imitation of his [Sekar] earlier works", in regards to the performances she found Napolean "remains silent and sober most of the time" and called Vijayakumar "earns one's admiration as the sensible and doting father-in-law of Manickam" but felt "the character's confusion after the return of the son, robs it of its intensity and dignity and the performance goes wasted". Cinesouth wrote "Of late, we have been witnessing many wonderful films revolving round the merits of good families. Everything shines by contrast and on comparison, our minds say no to 'Veettoda Mappillai', another family film. V.Sekhar has proved many a time in the past that he is adept in dishing out family entertainers with the due share of high-class comedy. But the trick has not worked well this time. Something has gone wrong somewhere".
