= Lakshmi Kalyanam (1968 film) =

1968 film by G. Or. Nathan

- Theatrical release poster
- Directed by: G. Or. Nathan
- Written by: A. L. Narayanan (dialogues)
- Story by: Kannadasan
- Produced by: Krishnalaya
- Starring: Sivaji Ganesan; Sowcar Janaki; Vennira Aadai Nirmala; K. Balaji; M. N. Nambiar
- Cinematography: G. Or. Nathan
- Edited by: P. Bakthavachalam
- Music by: M. S. Viswanathan
- Production company: ALS Productions
- Release date: 15 November 1968
- Country: India
- Language: Tamil

Lakshmi Kalyanam (transl. Lakshmi's Marriage) is a 1968 Indian Tamil-language film, directed by G. Or. Nathan and produced by A. L. Srinivasan. The film stars Sivaji Ganesan, Sowcar Janaki, Vennira Aadai Nirmala, K. Balaji and M. N. Nambiar. It was released on 15 November 1968. The film was remade in Telugu as Pelli Koothuru (1970).

== Plot ==
The film centers on the efforts of Kathirvel and his father, Egambaram, to arrange the marriage of Lakshmi. Lakshmi is the daughter of a single mother, Parvathi, and Kathirvel's family acts as her guardians. Their plans face a barrage of interference from eccentric local characters and unfortunate circumstances.

Obstacles include Suruttu, an old lecher determined to marry Lakshmi himself, and Maragatham, an aggressive woman pushing for Lakshmi to marry her simple-minded son, Gnanapalam. Furthermore, a prominent local named Rajankam initially agrees to wed his son to Lakshmi, only to abruptly back out of the arrangement. The situation is complicated by Parvathi's hidden past; her husband, Ragunathan, is a fugitive from justice. To avoid casting a shadow over Lakshmi's marital prospects, a distressed Parvathi is forced to keep her husband's identity and whereabouts a secret.

== Cast ==
- Sivaji Ganesan as Kathirvel
- Sowcar Janaki as Parvathi
- Vennira Aadai Nirmala as Lakshmi
- K. Balaji as Ramu
- M. N. Nambiar as Suruttu Sundaram Pillai
- Major Sundarrajan as Ragunathan
- V. K. Ramasamy as Egambaram
- V. S. Raghavan as Rajankam
- S. V. Ramadas as Rajadurai
- V. Gopalakrishnan as Balu
- Cho as Seenu
- A. Karunanidhi as Ganesan Pillai
- C. K. Saraswathi as Maragatham
- S. N. Lakshmi as Rajadurai's mother
- Shanmugasundari as Balu's mother
- P. D. Sambandam as Iyer
- S. Ramarao as Neelakanda Sastri
- Shanmuga Sundaram as Police Sub-Inspector
- "Periyar" Rajavel as Police Inspector

== Soundtrack ==
The music was composed by M. S. Viswanathan, with lyrics by Kannadasan. The song "Raman Ethanai Ramanadi" is set in Sindhu Bhairavi raga, and symbolises "the role of Ram in the popular imagination and in the arts". "Brindavanathukku", like many other songs by Kannadasan, extols Krishna.

Song	Singers	Length
"Brindavanathukku"	P. Susheela	04:35
"Yaaradaa Manithan Inge"	T. M. Soundararajan	03:27
"Raman Ethanai Ramanadi"	P. Susheela	04:33
"Thanga Therodum"	T. M. Soundararajan, Seerkazhi Govindarajan	05:24
"Poottale Unnaiyum"	T. M. Soundararajan, A. L. Raghavan, L. R. Eswari	04:18
"Vettaveli pottalile"	T. M. Soundararajan	03:10

== Release and reception ==
Lakshmi Kalyanam was released on 15 November 1968. The film won the Filmfare Award for Best Film – Tamil, and four Tamil Nadu State Film Awards: Best Music Director (Viswanathan), Best Male Playback Singer (Soundararajan), Best Female Playback Singer (Susheela) and Best Lyricist (Kannadasan).
