= Naan Pudicha Mappillai =

- VCD cover
- Directed by: V. Sekhar
- Written by: V. Sekhar
- Produced by: K. Parthiban Vetriyur; R. K Sethu; A. Rajendran
- Starring: Nizhalgal Ravi; Saranya Ponvannan; Aishwarya
- Cinematography: G. Rajendran
- Edited by: A. P. Manivannan
- Music by: Chandrabose
- Production company: Jayalakshmi Cine Makers
- Release date: 21 February 1991
- Running time: 141 minutes
- Country: India
- Language: Tamil

Naan Pudicha Mappillai (transl. The groom I chose) is a 1991 Indian Tamil-language comedy drama film written and directed by V. Sekhar. The film stars Nizhalgal Ravi, Saranya Ponvannan and Aishwarya, with Janagaraj, Sumithra, Goundamani, Senthil, Vasu Vikram and Shanmugasundari in supporting roles. It was released on 21 February 1991. The film was remade in Telugu as Mamagaru, in Kannada as Muddina Maava and in Hindi as Meherbaan.

== Cast ==
- Nizhalgal Ravi as Village President Muthuraj
- Saranya Ponvannan as Lakshmi
- Aishwarya as Rajathi
- Janagaraj as Pichayandi
- Sumithra as Rajathi's mother
- Goundamani as Thandavarayan
- Senthil as Konaiyan
- Vasu Vikram as Thandavarayan's son
- Shanmugasundari as Rajathi's grandmother

== Production ==
Sekhar revealed the film's plot was based on his friendly relationship he shared with his father-in-law.

== Soundtrack ==
Lyrics were written by Vaali, Pulamaipithan, Muthulingam and composed by Chandrabose.

| Title | Singer(s) | Duration |
|---|---|---|
| "Myna Myna Pakkathu Rani" | K. S. Chithra | 4:33 |
| "Velavane Muruga Vendukirom" | Malaysia Vasudevan; Vani Jairam | 5:00 |
| "Kudumbam Or Kovil" | K. J. Yesudas | 4:18 |
| "Deepavali Deepavali" | Chandrabose | 4:57 |
| "Ada Mookuthi Jolippu" | S. Janaki | 4:24 |
| "Unmaiyai Sollaporean" | Malaysia Vasudevan | 5:11 |

== Reception ==
Sundarji of Kalki praised the acting of Nizhalgal Ravi and Janagaraj and liked Diwali song from Chandrabose's music but panned other songs as formulaic and also felt the climax was rushed as if producer warned only two reels are remaining.
