= Ganeshkar =

Indian actor

- Born: Ganapathi; 24 February 1978 (age 48); Tamil Nadu, India
- Other names: Ganeshkar, Ganesh, Master Ganesh
- Occupation: Actor
- Years active: 1988–present
- Spouse(s): Aarthi (m.2009-present)

Ganapathi, credited as Ganeshkar, is an Indian actor known for his comedy roles in Tamil films. He is also a host for Super 10 on Sun TV in Chennai. He took part in Kalaignar TV's dance show, Maanada Mayilada, with Aarthi whom he married. They won 500,000 Indian Rupees as a 2nd prize.

== Partial filmography ==
=== Films ===
Child artist

- En Thangai Kalyani (1988)
- Pudhu Pudhu Arthangal (1989)
- Siva (1989)
- Neengalum Herothan (1990)
- Raktha Jwala (1990) (Telugu)
- Nee Pathi Naan Pathi (1991)
- Thaiyalkaran (1991)
- Sundara Kandam (1992)
- Moondravadhu Kann (1993)
- Parvathi Ennai Paradi (1993)

Comedian

- Thottil Kuzhandhai (1995)
- Avathara Purushan (1996)
- Musthaffaa (1996)
- Harichandra (1998) (uncredited)
- Koodi Vazhnthal Kodi Nanmai (2000)
- Kovil (2004)
- Selvam (2005)
- Pori (2007)
- Nenjathai Killadhe (2008)
- Tharagu (2008)
- Nepali (2008)
- Pandhayam (2008)
- Nadigai (2008)
- Padikkathavan (2009)
- Pinju Manasu (2009)
- Chapter 6 (2010; Telugu)
- Udhayan (2011)
- Mambattiyan (2011)
- Kazhugu (2012)
- Karuppampatti (2013)
- Kanna Laddu Thinna Aasaiya (2013)
- Arya Surya (2013)
- Idhu Kathirvelan Kadhal (2014)
- Aranmanai (2014)
- Dhilluku Dhuddu (2016)
- Hello Naan Pei Pesuren (2016)
- Mohini (2018)
- Chithiram Pesuthadi 2 (2019)
- Call Taxi (2021)
- Pei Mama (2021)
- Otha Votu Muthaiya (2025)
- Mrs & Mr (2025)

=== Television ===
- Meendum Meendum Sirippu
- Super 10
- Abhirami
- Padavarisai 10
- Undi Vil
- Mariyadhai Raman kathaigal
- Amma Inge Ganeshu Ange
- Maanada Mayilada
- Kasalavu Nesam
- Sirippulogam
- Bommalattam
- Star Wars
- Anbe Vaa
- Abhiyum Naanum
