= Star Wars (Indian TV series) =

- Genre: Reality
- Presented by: (Season: 1); Abhirami Venkatachalam; Kathir (Season: 2); Vikraman Radhakrishnan; Abhirami Venkatachalam
- Country of origin: India
- Original language: Tamil
- No. of seasons: 2
- No. of episodes: 32

Production
- Production location: India
- Camera setup: Multi-camera
- Running time: approx. 40–45 minutes per episode

Original release
- Network: Sun TV
- Release: 5 November 2017 – 17 June 2018

Related
- Mr & Mrs Khiladis; Achcham Thavir

Star War is a 2017-2018 Indian-Tamil-language Celebrity Couples stunt/dare reality-comedy game show, based on the American Fear Factor. It aired on Sun TV from 5 November 2017 to 17 June 2018 on every Sunday at 12:00PM (IST) for 32 Episodes. The Contestants of is popular Television and Film artist and Hosted by Abi and Kathir in the first season and Abi and Vikram in the second season. The Show first season winners are Nancy Jennifer and Ramakrishnan and the second season winners are Nimmi and Aravind.

The second season has been started from 18 February 2018, with 8 new Television and Film artist. The second season hosted by Vikiram and Abi.

== Seasons overview ==
Season	Episodes	Originally aired		Time
Season	Episodes	First aired	Last aired	Time
1	1–19	5 November 2017	11 February 2018	Sunday; 12:00PM (IST)
2	20–32	18 February 2018	17 June 2018	Sunday; 12:00PM (IST)

== Season 1 ==
=== Winners ===
Top 4	Winners	Points	Notes
01	Nancy Jennifer; Ramakrishnan	400	Winners
02	Teju; Niharika	350	Runner-up
03	Shwetha Bandekar; Nagashree	200	2rd Runner-up
04	Vijay; Sivaranjani	100	3rd Runner-up

=== Celebrities ===
- Shwetha Bandekar: is a Tamil television actress, who had appeared in Tamil serial on television like Chandralekha and Lakshmi Vandhachu.
- Abhinayashree: is an Indian actress who has appeared in South Indian regional language films like Friends, Thathi Thavadhu Manasu, Uu Kodathara? Ulikki Padathara?.
- Teju (Shyamili): is a Tamil television and film actress, who had appeared in Tamil serial on television like Romapuri Pandian and Vani Rani.
- Niharika
- Aarthi: an actress who has primarily appeared as a comedienne in Tamil films.
- Ganeshkar: an actor who has primarily appeared as a comedienne in Tamil films.
- Nancy Jennifer: an actress who has appeared in supporting roles for the films, Ghilli (2004) and serials, Thayumanavan (2013–14) and Keladi Kanmani (2015–2017).
- Ramakrishnan: is a Tamil film actor, best known for playing leading role in Kunguma Poovum Konjum Puravum (2009)
- Vijay: a television actor, best known for playing main role in Priyamanaval and EMI Thavanai Murai Vazhkai.
- Sivaranjani: a television actress, who has appeared in leading roles in television Mohini (2014–2015), Arangetram (2014) and Priyamanaval.
- Nagashree

=== Team ===
#	Celebrities	Notes
01	Shwetha Bandekar; Nagashree	Abhinayashree (Left)
02	Teju; Niharika	
03	Aarthi; Ganeshkar	(left this show)
04	Nancy Jennifer; Ramakrishnan	
05	Vijay; Sivaranjani	

== Season 2 ==
=== Celebrities ===
- Nancy Jennifer: an actress who has appeared in supporting roles for the films, Ghilli (2004) and serials, Thayumanavan (2013–14), Keladi Kanmani (2015–2017) also title winner is Star war season 1.
- Ramakrishnan: is a Tamil film actor, best known for playing leading role in Kunguma Poovum Konjum Puravum (2009) and title winner is Star war season 1.
- Shanthini: is a Tamil Television Actress, who had appeared in Tamil Serial on television like Sumangali and Apoorva Raagangal.
- Black Pandi: is a Tamil comedy actor.
- Pavithiran: is a Tamil television actor, who had appeared in the TV series Kula Deivam.
- Nimmy: an actress.
- Shalu Shamu: a Tamil film actress, who had appeared in 2013 Tamil Film Varuthapadatha Valibar Sangam.
- Aravind: is a Tamil Television Actor, who had appeared in Tamil Serial on television like Pasamalar and Ganga.
- Shwetha: is a Tamil Television Actress, who had appeared in Tamil Serial on television like Karthigai Pengal and Apoorva Raagangal.
- Shanthini Deva: an actress who has appeared in 2009 Tamil Film Naadodigal.

=== Team ===
#	Celebrities	Notes
01	Shalu Shammu; Black Pandi	
02	Shanthini Deva; Pavithiran	
03	Shanthini; Shwetha	
04	Nancy Jennifer; Ramakrishnan	
05	Aravind; Nimi	
