= Thirumbi Paar (1996 film) =

- Directed by: Rama Narayanan
- Written by: Rama Narayanan; Pugazhmani (dialogues)
- Produced by: N. Ramasami
- Starring: Saravanan; Yuvarani
- Cinematography: Baby Philips
- Edited by: Baburaj
- Music by: Deva
- Production company: Sri Thenandal Films
- Release date: 15 January 1996
- Running time: 130 minutes
- Country: India
- Language: Tamil

Thirumbi Paar (transl. Look back) is a 1996 Indian Tamil-language comedy drama film directed by Rama Narayanan. The film stars Saravanan and Yuvarani, with Silk Smitha, Manivannan, Vinu Chakravarthy, S. S. Chandran, Nizhalgal Ravi, Chandresekhar and Pandiyan playing supporting roles. It was released on 15 January 1996.

== Plot ==
Avuthu Nayagam is a wealthy politician who lives with his second wife Vasantha. Vasantha is a miser and cunning woman, she buys many properties around her village, she even forces the villagers to sell it to her at low prices. Nayagam's first wife Valliamai and son Veeraiyan live in a small house. Veeraiyan, an ardent fan of actor Rajinikanth, works as a bus conductor and hates Vasantha who brainwashed his father's mind.

One day, Vasantha's assistants Chokku, Kanakku and Azhagu try to buy a free school owned by the retired military officer Karnal Raja. Raja refuses to sell it, and he is beaten up by the assistants. Veeraiyan intervenes in time, saves him and his school from the assistants. Frustrated by the incident, Vasantha immediately buys the bus company where Veeraiyan is working, and her brother Ashok becomes Veeraiyan's bus company manager. Vasantha hates Veeraiyan more than anything but she is acting to her husband Nayagam as she is Veeraiyan's well-wisher.

A few days later, Karnal Raja is heavily injured by Vasantha's henchmen. Veeraiyan tries to save him, but Karnal Raja died on the way to the hospital. Later, Ashok dismissed Veeraiyan from the bus company, Veeraiyan decides to become a milkman and begins to manage Karnal Raja's school himself. In the meantime, Veeraiyan and Chokku's niece Madhavi fall in love with each other. Soon, Vasantha wants her brother to marry her brother Ashok. The conflict between Ashok and Vasantha becomes worst. What transpires next forms the rest of the story.

== Cast ==
- Saravanan as Veeraiyan
- Yuvarani as Madhavi
- Silk Smitha as Vasantha
- Manivannan as Chokku
- Vinu Chakravarthy as Avuthu Nayagam
- S. S. Chandran as Kanakku
- Nizhalgal Ravi as Karnal Raja (guest appearance)
- Chandresekhar as Appadurai
- Pandiyan as Ashok
- Vadivukkarasi as Valliamai
- B. Ashokarajan as Azhagu
- Pasi Narayanan
- Master Saravanan
- Karuppu Subbiah
- Kullamani
- Thillai Rajan
- Bangalore Chidambaram
- Veerabhadran
- Ali

== Production ==
The film was shot in Mysore.

== Soundtrack ==
The soundtrack was composed by Deva, with lyrics written by Vaali.

| Song | Singer(s) | Duration |
|---|---|---|
| "Anne Anne Thirumbi Paarunga" | Mano | 2:42 |
| "Nallavanga Kaatum" | Krishnaraj | 4:11 |
| "Anna Sonnaru" | Krishnaraj | 4:32 |
| "Vala Vayasukulla" | K. S. Chithra | 4:36 |
| "Kaaramada Pakkama" | Sushmitha | 3:07 |

== Reception ==
D. S. Ramanujam of The Hindu wrote, "Director Rama Narayanan takes a mighty swipe at the political scenario in Tamil Nadu, Pugazhmani's veiled digs at the people at helm, hitting the bull's eye through the screenplay of the director in `Thenandal Pictures' Thirumbipaar. The minute the director exhausts all his ammunition, the proceeding loses its sting and concludes on expected lines".
