= Thayumanavan =

2003 film directed by Saravanan

- DVD cover
- Directed by: Saravanan
- Written by: Saravanan
- Produced by: Kandhasamy
- Starring: Saravanan; Prema; Srichandana
- Music by: Vaigundavasaan
- Production company: Atthanur Amman Arts
- Release date: 18 July 2003
- Country: India
- Language: Tamil

Thayumanavan is a 2003 Indian Tamil-language action drama film written, produced and directed by Saravanan, who also stars in the lead role alongside actresses Prema and Srichandana. Babloo Prithviraj, Sriman and Yugendran appear in supporting roles. It was not a box office success.

== Cast ==
- Saravanan as Senbagapandian and Duraipandian
- Prema as Janaki
- Srichandana as Anandavalli
- Babloo Prithviraj as Kanna
- Sriman as Chellamuthu
- Yugendran as Veeramuthu
- Lavanya as Thenmozhi
- Bhuvaneswari
- Alex
- Ponnambalam

== Production ==
Thayumanavan marked the directorial debut of actor Saravanan who also portrayed the lead role. A fight sequence between Saravanan and Ponnambalam was shot at a forest near Yercaud.

== Soundtrack ==
The soundtrack was composed by debutant Vaigundavasaan.

Track listing
No.	Title	Singer(s)	Length
1.	"Puyal Adikkakandomey"	Roshini, Tippu
2.	"Ezhumalaiyane"	Manikka Vinayagam
3.	"Poonguyile"	Mano, Harini
4.	"Aariraro"	Swarnalatha
5.	"Anbe Manithan"	S. P. Balasubrahmanyam
6.	"Oh Aasai"	S. P. Balasubrahmanyam

== Reception ==
Malini Mannath of Chennai Online gave a negative review, saying "The scripting is poor and the narration confused. The film is a lesson on how not to make a film".
