= Parvathi Ennai Paradi =

- Poster
- Directed by: V. Sekhar
- Written by: V. Sekhar
- Produced by: K. R. Gangadharan
- Starring: Saravanan; Sri Parvathi
- Cinematography: M. C. Sekar
- Edited by: K. Shankar; V. Jayapal
- Music by: Ilaiyaraaja
- Production company: KRG Movies International
- Release date: 23 July 1993
- Running time: 140 minutes
- Country: India
- Language: Tamil

Parvathi Ennai Paradi (transl. Parvathi, look at me) is a 1993 Indian Tamil-language romantic drama film written and directed by V. Sekhar. The film stars Saravanan and Sri Parvathi with Janagaraj, Vijayakumar, Srividya, Lalitha Kumari, Charle and Vasu Vikram playing supporting roles. It was released on 23 July 1993.

== Plot ==
Rajadurai (Vijayakumar) is a wealthy man and highly respected figure in his village. He has a spoiled daughter named Parvathi (Sri Parvathi). Venkatraman (Janagaraj) is a newly appointed Tamil teacher of a college in Rajadurai's village. Unlike other teachers, students like his way of teaching and friendly approach. Parvathi really appreciates Venkatraman and she has private tuitions with the teacher. Venkatraman is married to Gayathri (Srividya), they have a son named Siva.

Siva is a short-tempered person who cannot tolerate injustice. While studying in college, he beat up the minister's son who raped his classmate and was later expelled from the college. Afterwards, his father found him a job in a newspaper company. One day, the company owner cut the finger of a poor labourer in front of Siva. Siva, in turn, cut the owner's finger and was sent to jail.

Siva comes back from jail and goes back to his parents. At his arrival, Parvathi clashes with Siva, their bickering continues every time they meet. Siva later becomes the manager company of Rajadurai's company. Siva and Parvathi slowly fall in love with each other. Ramesh (Vasu Vikram), Rajadurai's nephew, is a wicked womaniser and he wants to appropriate Rajadurai's company. So Ramesh decides to marry Parvathi at all costs. What transpires next forms the rest of the story.

== Cast ==
- Saravanan as Siva
- Sri Parvathi as Parvathi
- Janagaraj as Venkatraman
- Vijayakumar as Rajadurai
- Srividya as Gayathri
- Lalitha Kumari
- Charle as Pattinathar
- Vasu Vikram as Ramesh
- Ganeshkar
- Master Haja Sheriff
- Kovai Babu
- Idichapuli Selvaraj as Iyer
- LIC Narasimhan as College principal
- Pasi Narayanan as Munuswamy
- MLA Thangaraj as the company owner
- Singamuthu

== Soundtrack ==
The music was composed by Ilaiyaraaja. The song "Muthu There" is set in Pahadi raga.

Song	Singer(s)	Lyrics	Duration
"Chinna Poongili"	S. P. Balasubrahmanyam, S. Janaki	Vaali	5:01
"Kaadhalil Maataamal"	Malaysia Vasudevan	Piraisoodan	2:28
"Kombugal Illa"	S. P. Balasubrahmanyam, K. S. Chithra, Chorus	Piraisoodan	4:41
"Maanukkum"	S. Janaki, Chorus	Gangai Amaran	5:04
"Muthu Therey"	S. P. Balasubrahmanyam, K. S. Chithra	Gangai Amaran	4:28
"Parvathi Ennai Paradi"	S. P. Balasubrahmanyam	Vaali	5:04
"Sooriyana Kandavudan"	S. Janaki	Vaali	5:05
"Valibare"	Malaysia Vasudevan, Chorus	Vaali	4:45

== Reception ==
Malini Mannath of The Indian Express gave a negative review and labelled the film "cliched". R. P. R. of Kalki said Ilaiyaraaja was the only saving grace of the film.
