= Koodi Vazhnthal Kodi Nanmai (2000 film) =

- VCD cover
- Directed by: V. Sekhar
- Written by: V. Sekhar
- Produced by: S. S. Durai Raju; K. Parthiban
- Starring: Nassar; Karan; Khushbu; Roja; Vadivelu; Vivek; Kovai Sarala
- Cinematography: P. S. Selvam
- Edited by: A. P. Manivannan
- Music by: Deva
- Production company: Thiruvalluvar Kalaikoodam
- Release date: 15 July 2000
- Running time: 155 minutes
- Country: India
- Language: Tamil

Koodi Vazhnthal Kodi Nanmai (transl. Unity is propitious) is a 2000 Indian Tamil-language comedy drama film directed by V. Sekhar. The film stars Nassar, Karan, Khushbu, Roja, Vadivelu, Vivek and Kovai Sarala (in her 100th Tamil film). It was released on 15 July 2000. The film was remade in Kannada as Jenu Goodu.

== Plot ==
Thangaraj is an innocent man from a middle-class family, consisting of his wife Meenakshi and daughter Padma. Boxer Krishnan, an irresponsible person with dreams of making it big in politics, is Thangaraj's younger brother and is married to Kanagavalli. Sivaraman is Thangaraj's youngest brother, who is well-educated and works at the same company where Thangaraj works, which is owned by Valluvardasan. They all live in a single house as a joint family. Thangaraj and Meenakshi were responsible for raising Sivaraman, and they consider him their own son. The family's financial status improves as Sivaraman earns well.

Valluvardasan is impressed by Sivaraman's character and decides to get his daughter Tamilselvi married to him, despite them belonging to a lower societal status. He also likes Thangaraj's joint family. Initially, Kanagavalli remains skeptical about Tamilselvi as she is from a wealthy family and believes that she will not mingle with other family members, but Tamilselvi respects everyone in the family. Meanwhile, Sivaraman's behavior changes, as he thinks he is the major breadwinner for the family, and he wants other family members to obey him. This brings up frequent quarrels between Krishnan and Sivaraman as Sivaraman does not like Krishnan being idle at home with political aspirations.

Dhandapani is a neighbour of Thangaraj, and he falls in love with Padma. Learning of the love affair, Thangaraj decides to get them married, but Dhandapani's father Veerapandi demands a huge dowry. Thangaraj and Krishnan accept the dowry with the hope that Sivaraman will provide the money. Sivaraman becomes furious upon knowing this, and he refuses to give money, which results in a clash between the family members. Meenakshi feels bad as Sivaraman's priorities have changed to money, and she decides to leave the house with her daughter. Thangaraj also leaves the home along with her.

Tamilselvi learns that it was Thangaraj and Meenakshi who tried hard to educate Sivaraman and understands that it is her turn to help them in return. Tamilselvi worries that the joint family has fallen apart, and she tries to reunite them. She meets Meenakshi, apologizes for her husband's behavior, and offers the money needed for Padma's wedding. However, Thangaraj does not accept this and instead becomes furious seeing Tamilselvi, as he believes that Sivaraman has changed significantly after earning money.

Sivaraman picks up a quarrel with Tamilselvi after knowing that she has met Meenakshi and Kanagavalli. Additionally, Thangaraj dislikes Meenakshi making friends with Tamilselvi and is not interested in getting Padma married to Dhandapani as he does not want to depend on Tamilselvi's help. However, Meenakshi, Kanagavalli, and Tamilselvi join and conduct the marriage between Padma and Dhandapani. Finally, Thangaraj's coworkers participate with him and protest against Sivaraman, where he gets beaten up. Sivaraman realizes his mistake and apologizes to his family members. In the end, everyone again moves as a joint family.

== Cast ==
- Nassar as Thangarasu
- Karan as Sivaraman
- Khushbu as Meenakshi (Voice dubbed by KR Anuradha)
- Roja as Tamilselvi (Voice dubbed by Jayageetha)
- Vadivelu as 'Boxer' Krishnan
- Vivek as Dhandapani
- Kovai Sarala as Kanagavalli
- Vijayakumar as Valluvardasan
- Kavitha as Padma (Voice dubbed by Renuka Kathir)
- Thyagu as Veerapandi
- Ramesh Khanna as Ramesh
- Suryakanth as Opposition party member
- Bonda Mani as Boxer Krishnan's assistant
- Ganeshkar as Boxer Krishnan's assistant
- Master Pandi as Boxer Krishnan's son
- Master Udayaraj as Boxer Krishnan's son

== Soundtrack ==
The music was composed by Deva.

Song	Singer(s)	Lyrics	Duration
"Koodi Vazhnthal Kodi"	S. P. Balasubrahmanyam, K. S. Chithra	Muthulingam	5:08
"Enga Veettu Kalyanam"	S. P. Balasubrahmanyam, K. S. Chithra	Kamakodiyan	5:07
"Engal Thamizh Selvi"	K. S. Chithra, Chorus	Kalidasan	4:55
"Happy 2000"	S. P. Balasubrahmanyam, Chorus	Palani Bharathi	4:57
"Singara Chennaiyile"	Deva, Chorus	Kalidasan	5:10

== Reception ==
S. R. Ashok Kumar of The Hindu gave the film a mixed review: "The film begins brightly but falls flat in the second half". Ayyappa Prasad from Screen noted there were "good performances" though "technically, the film has nothing much to offer". Malini Mannath wrote for Chennai Online, "Director Shekhar, who is well versed with the middle class psyche, handles the scenes with expertise. The scenes are built up very naturally, the build-up to the fight very spontaneous. But after the break-up, the director [loses] focus. The screenplay takes a nose dive from which it never recovers". India Info wrote "The first half of the film is realistic but loses ground in the second half where the director resorts to typical gimmicks to drive home the point. However, all the artistes have given a seasoned performance. Like in all Shekar films, technical aspects like editing have been overlooked. Marring the narration is an overdose of songs, mostly pedestrian stuff tuned by Deva".
