= Sirippulogam =

- Also known as: Smiley world
- Genre: Soap opera Drama; Comedy
- Starring: Chinni Jayanth; Vennira Aadai Moorthy; Chitti Babu; Aarthi; Ganeshkar; Badava Gopi
- Country of origin: India
- Original language: Tamil
- No. of seasons: 1
- No. of episodes: 20

Production
- Producer: Kalanidhi Maran
- Production location: Tamil Nadu
- Editor: Prem
- Camera setup: Multi-camera
- Running time: approx. 18-20 minutes per episode
- Production company: SunNetwork

Original release
- Network: Sun TV
- Release: 18 June – 13 July 2012

Related
- Aan Paavam; Andha Pathu Naatkal

Sirippulogam is a 2012-2012 Indian Tamil language soap opera that aired on Sun TV from 18 June 2012 to 13 July 2012. The show starring by Chinni Jayanth, Vennira Aadai Moorthy, Chitti Babu, Aarthi, Ganeshkar and Badava Gopi. The show ended with 20 episodes.

== Plot ==
The serial was a humorous take on Yemalogam as Chinni Jayanth as Yema. The rift and problems between the ministers in the court of Yema is solved by Yema, in very comical way. The serial made the audience laugh out their everyday problems in their lives.

== Cast ==
- Chinni Jayanth as Yema
- Vennira Aadai Moorthy as Chitraguptan
- Chitti Babu
- Aarthi
- Ganeshkar
- Badava Gopi

== See also ==
- List of programs broadcast by Sun TV
- List of TV shows aired on Sun TV (India)
