= Shanmugasundari =

Tamil actress

Shanmugasundari T
- Born: 23 September 1937
- Died: 1 May 2012 (aged 74)
- Occupation: actress
- Years active: 1962-2003
- Children: TK Kala, Neela, Mala, Selvi

Shanmugasundari T (23 September 1937 – 1 May 2012) was a Tamil actress, who acted in more than 750 films. Her daughter T. K. Kala is also an actress and playback singer. She also appeared in comedy roles along with Vadivelu in many films.

== Career ==
Shanmugasundari started her stage performances at the age of 5. She survived nearly 45 years in the film industry and did more than 750 films. She was also a dubbing artist. She also acted in comedy roles, especially as a mother of Vadivelu in many films. Shanmugasundari acted along with M. G. Ramachandran in Idhayakkani, Neerum Neruppum, Kannan En Kaadhalan and En Annan. In Lakshmi Kalyanam and Vadivukku Valaikaappu along with Sivaji Ganeshan and Malathi, along with Gemini Ganeshan. Shanmugasundari received the Kalaimamani Award from Tamil Nadu Government for her best acting in dramas roles 1982 - 1983.

== Personal life ==
Shanmugasundari has 5 daughters named T. K. Kala, Neela, Mala, Meena and Selvi. T. K. Kala is also an actress, and playback singer.

== Death ==
Due to illness, Shanmugasundari was admitted to a hospital and died on 1 May 2012 morning at 4.30 AM . She was 74.

== Filmography ==
=== Films ===
This is a partial filmography. You can expand it.

Year	Films	Role	Notes
1960	Vijayapuri Veeran	Jothi	
1962	Vadivukku Valai Kappu		
1968	Kannan En Kaadhalan		
1968	Lakshmi Kalyanam		
1968	Thillana Mohanambal		
1969	Adimai Penn		
1970	Dharisanam		
1970	En Annan		
1971	Neerum Neruppum		
1971	Babu		
1972	Kurathi Magan		
1973	Deivamsam		
1973	Manipayal		
1975	Idhayakkani		
1976	Oorukku Uzhaippavan		
1977	Navarathinam	Pimpstress	
1978	Sakka Podu Podu Raja		
1988	Nethiyadi		
1991	Naan Pudicha Mappillai		
1992	Abhirami		
1992	David Uncle		
1992	Onna Irukka Kathukkanum		
1993	Nallathe Nadakkum		
1993	Purusha Lakshanam		
1994	Mahanadhi		
1994	Atha Maga Rathiname		
1994	Chinna Madam		
1994	Manasu Rendum Pudhusu		
1994	Seeman		
1994	Vaa Magale Vaa		
1994	Varavu Ettana Selavu Pathana		
1995	Naan Petha Magane		
1995	Avatharam		
1995	Thamizhachi		
1996	Parambarai		
1996	Varraar Sandiyar		
1996	Vaazhga Jananayagam		
1996	Kaalam Maari Pochu		
1996	Selva		
1997	Vaazhga Jananayagam		
1997	Pongalo Pongal		
1999	Pudhu Kudithanam		
2000	Parthen Rasithen		
2001	Middle Class Madhavan		
2001	Ninaikkatha Naalillai		
2001	Aandan Adimai		
2001	Sigamani Ramamani		
2003	Julie Ganapathi		
2003	Winner		

=== Television ===
- 2002-2005 Metti Oli as Kamatchi (House Owner Paati)
- 2003-2004 Kolangal as Rajaram's mother
- 2004-2006 Ahalya

=== Voice artist ===
Year	Films	Actor	Notes
1991	Gang Leader	Nirmalamma	For Tamil dubbed version
1998	Ganesh	Telangana Shakuntala	For Tamil dubbed version
