= S. P. Y. Surendranath Arya =

Sinhakulathipati Papanarya Yatiraj Surendranath Voegeli-Arya was an Indian independence activist from the Madras Presidency.

== Early life ==
Surendranath Arya was born Ethiraj to Dhanakoti Raju Naidu in a Telugu-speaking family of the city of Madras. On completion of his initial education, he got involved in extremist political activities and moved to Bengal in 1897 where he lived until 1906 and formed contacts with Bengali revolutionaries. On his return, he adopted the name "Surendranath" after the Bengali revolutionary Surendranath Banerjee and styled himself "Arya" or "native of India".

== Arrest ==
Once in Madras, he established a close bond with the Tamil revolutionary Subramanya Bharathi and was one of the founders of the Chennai Jana Sangam. He was arrested on 18 August 1908 on charges of sedition and sentenced to transportation for 11 years.

According to the prosecution, Ethiraj is believed to have said on 3 May 1908:

In India, there were 33 crores of men and if they only spit and throw sand on the foreigners they would be drowned in the spittle

== Imprisonment ==
Surendranath Arya was released from prison in 1914 after six years of rigorous imprisonment in Bellary. During his imprisonment, his health had broken down and he had contracted leprosy. He was treated by Danish Christian missionaries and in gratitude towards them, Arya converted to Christianity.

Arya went to the United States to study divination where he earned a Masters of Arts degree from Grove City College in 1917. After he returned to Madras as a missionary of the Danish Mission Church. On returning to India, Arya married a Swedish American woman whose name "Voegeli" he added to his own. Arya was one of the few who attended Bharathy's cremation in 1921 where he delivered a eulogy in Telugu.

== Later life ==
Arya divorced his Swedish American wife and reconverted to Hinduism in the late 1920s. He became a member of the Brahmo Samaj and supported the Self Respect Movement. During this time, he became a close friend of Periyar E. V. Ramasami.

== In popular culture ==
Nizhalgal Ravi played the part of Surendranath Arya in the 2000 Tamil film Bharathi.
