= Aarthi Ganeshkar =

Indian actress

Aarthi
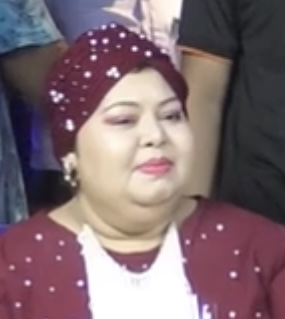
- Born: Aarthi; Uthagai, Nilagiri, Tamil Nadu
- Other name: Harathi
- Occupations: Actress, comedian, television host
- Years active: 1987–present
- Spouse: Ganeshkar (m. 2009)
- Awards: Kalaimamani Award (2006)

Aarthi, also known as Harathi, is an Indian actress, comedian and television host who works in Tamil films and television dramas. She initially worked as a child artist in the late 1990s, she also appeared in stand-up comedy shows namely Super10 and Lollu Sabha, before joining the Tamil film industry, she has played roles in Giri (2004), Padikkadavan (2009) and Kutty (2010).

== Career ==
She started her career in Vanna Kanavugal movie when she was only 6 months old. Later Iyal Isai Nadaka Mandram headed by ex chief minister of Tamil Nadu Mr. Mu. Karunanidhi awarded her Kalaimamani Award(2006) for her unique style of humorous acting in films. Some of her popular early films included Arul (2004), Giri (2004) and Kundakka Mandakka (2005), in which she collaborated with actor Vadivelu. For her roles in Padikkadavan (2009) and Kutty (2010), she won the Best Female Comedienne awards from Ananda Vikatan for two consecutive years. During the same year, she was awarded the Tamil Nadu State Film Award for Best Comedian for her work in the film, Paraseega Mannan (2012). She later won appreciation from The Hindu's critic for her appearance in an item number in Vishnuvardhan's Yatchan (2015).

In 2017, Aarthi took part in the Tamil reality television show, Bigg Boss hosted by Kamal Haasan. She was evicted from the show on day 21, but later returned for a fortnight as a guest contestant.

== Personal life ==
Aarthi married fellow comedian Ganeshkar in a ceremony in Guruvayoor during October 2009, before the pair returned to Chennai for a wedding reception. The pair had earlier been dance partners during the reality dance show, Maanada Mayilada.

== Selected filmography ==
=== Tamil films ===
Child artiste

- Vanna Kanavugal (1987)
- En Thangai Kalyani (1988)
- Thendral Sudum (1989)
- Kavalukku Kettikaran (1990)
- Anjali (1990)
- Chatriyan (1990)

Comedian

- Arul (2004) as Neelaveni
- Giri (2004) as Bun
- Maayavi (2005) as Constable Eashwari
- Kaatrullavarai (2005) as Jyothika
- Kundakka Mandakka (2005)
- Chinna (2005) as Maha
- Kannamma (2005)
- Pattiyal (2006) as Aarthi
- Azhagai Irukkirai Bayamai Irukkirathu (2006)
- Thirupathi (2006)
- Parijatham (2006)
- Kusthi (2006) as Sulukku Sundari
- Sivi (2006)
- Nenjirukkum Varai (2006)
- Thaamirabharani (2007) as Meenakshi
- Malaikottai (2007)
- Machakaaran (2007)
- Kuruvi (2008) as Constable Ranganayaki
- Jayamkondaan (2008) as Sindhamani
- Villu (2009)
- Padikkadavan (2009)
- Guru En Aalu (2009)
- Engal Aasan (2009)
- Adada Enna Azhagu (2009)
- Karthik Anitha (2009)
- Ainthaam Padai (2009)
- Thoranai (2009)
- Pudhiya Payanam (2009)
- Malai Malai (2009)
- Pinju Manasu (2009)
- Suriyan Satta Kalloori (2009)
- Netru Pol Indru Illai (2009)
- Kutty (2010)
- Thairiyam (2010)
- Veerasekaran (2010)
- Guru Sishyan (2010)
- Pournami Nagam (2010)
- Bale Pandiya (2010)
- Uthama Puthiran (2010)
- Aduthathu (2011)
- Kazhugu (2012)
- Thadaiyara Thaakka (2012)
- Chaarulatha (2012)
- Paraseega Mannan (2012)
- Ethir Neechal (2013)
- Naan Rajavaga Pogiren (2013)
- Sonna Puriyathu (2013)
- Chithirayil Nilachoru (2013)
- Ya Ya (2013)
- Kantha (2013)
- Vanakkam Chennai (2013)
- Ingu Kadhal Katrutharapadum (2013)
- Inga Enna Solluthu (2014)
- Idhu Kathirvelan Kadhal (2014)
- Naan Sigappu Manithan (2014)
- Vetri Selvan (2014)
- Aranmanai (2014)
- Kayal (2014)
- Killadi (2015)
- Sonna Pochu (2015)
- Moone Moonu Varthai (2015)
- Yatchan (2015)
- Kalai Vendhan (2015)
- Sowkarpettai (2016)
- Aasi (2016)
- Thiraikku Varadha Kadhai (2016)
- Kaththi Sandai (2016)
- Enna Thavam Seitheno (2018)
- Sandimuni (2020)
- Baby and Baby (2025)
- Sumo (2025)
- Mrs & Mr (2025)

=== Other language films ===
Telugu films

- Souryam (2008)
- Pistha (2009)
- Nuvvekkadunte Nenakkadunta (2012)
- Moodu Mukkallo Cheppalante (2015)

Malayalam films

- Notebook (2006)
- Money Ratnam (2014)
- Girls (2016)

Kannada film

- Vishnuvardhana (2011)

== Awards ==
Year	Title
2009	Ananda Vikatan Cinema Award for Best Comedian – Female - Padikkadavan
2010	Ananda Vikatan Cinema Award for Best Comedian – Female - Kutty
2012	Tamil Nadu State Film Award for Best Comedian - Paraseega Mannan

== Television ==
Year	Title	Notes
	Super 10	
	Dhinam Dhinam Deepavali	
2008	Maanada Mayilada	
2008	Kalasam	
2009	Anu Alavum Bayamillai	
2012	Sirippulogam	
	Kitchen Super Star (season 1)	
2017	Bigg Boss	
2017-2018	Kalakka Povathu Yaaru? (season 5)	(season 5/6/7)
2017-2018	Star Wars	
2018	Bigg Boss Tamil 2	guest day "85 to 91"
2019	Sun Kudumbam Viruthugal	
2020	Idhayathai Thirudathey	
2021	Anbe Vaa	
2021	LOL: Enga Siri Paapom	Contestant
2022	Abhiyum Naanum	
