= Saravanan (actor) =

Indian actor

- Born: Saravanan; 5 December 1966 (age 59); Salem, Tamil Nadu, India
- Occupation: Actor
- Years active: 1991–present
- Spouse: Suryashree
- Children: 1

Saravanan is an Indian actor who has appeared in Tamil-language films. He made his acting debut through Vaidhehi Vanthachu (1991), where he portrayed the lead role. He continued to play the lead roles in films throughout the 1990s, later turning into a producer and director for his films. After a sabbatical, Saravanan made a comeback through Paruthiveeran (2007) in a supporting role. and has since continued to play character roles in Tamil films

== Early life and family ==
Saravanan was born into a Tamil family in Salem and was the second of five children. His father was a police inspector and his mother was a staff nurse. Saravanan obtained a Bachelor of Arts degree in Tamil Literature from the Government Arts College, Salem.

Saravanan has been married twice. His first marriage was to Suryashree, a Telugu woman with whom he studied in Adyar Film Institute. In an episode of Bigg Boss Tamil 3, he opened up on his second marriage and that it was his first wife who accepted the second marriage as they wanted a child.

== Career ==
Saravanan had an interest in Tamil films as a child and regularly took part in performance arts during school. He visited the sets of a film being shot in Salem by director M. Sivachandran and requested him for an opportunity to act in his films. He consequently became acquainted with Sivachandran and his then-wife, Lakshmi, and the pair were keen to launch him as an actor opposite Lakshmi's daughter Aishwarya, but the plans did not materialise. Saravanan then moved to Chennai and completed a course in acting at the Adyar Film Institute. While on campus, he was spotted by director Radha Bharathi, who offered him the chance to be a part of the film Vaidehi Vandhachu (1991). Saravanan subsequently played a series of the lead role in films in the 1990s, but his career came to a halt in the latter end of the decade. Towards the end of the first phase of his career, he produced two of his films Vishwanath (1996) and Santosham (1998). Though Santhosam did well at the box office, still, he incurred losses as a producer which led him to take a long break from acting. He organised concerts abroad to clear the losses. In 2001, Saravanan appeared in a negative role in Bala's Nandhaa, winning critical acclaim, but did not appear in any other roles at the time. He also directed, Thayumanavan (2003) in an attempt to get his career back on track however the film went unnoticed.

He went on to make a comeback in Ameer Sultan's Paruthiveeran (2007) playing the paternal uncle of the character portrayed by Karthi, and won critical acclaim for his performance. A critic from Rediff.com noted "Saravanan excels and doesn't look like someone back from a long break", while Sify.com's reviewer stated his performance as the "wayward uncle with a heart of gold is terrific". Saravanan was awarded the Filmfare Award for Best Tamil Actor and also received a nomination in the same category for the Vijay Awards. The success of Paruthiveeran subsequently triggered more offers for the actor including the opportunity to be a part of Sanjay Ram's biopic, Veeramum Eeramum (2007), based on the real life of Venkatesa Pannaiyar. In the late 2000s and early 2010s, Saravanan continued to play supporting roles in Tamil films, sometimes appearing in negative roles.

His supporting roles in Enakku Innoru Per Irukku (2016), Kadaikutty Singam (2018) and Kolamavu Kokila (2019), among others won him praise.

On 23 June 2019, he entered the reality television show Bigg Boss Tamil 3 hosted by Kamal Haasan on Star Vijay. He was ejected from the show after making controversial remarks on a televised show, where he admitted to harassing women on public transport during his youth.

He started season 2 of the series Suzhal: The Vortex (2025).

== Filmography ==
Year	Film	Role	Notes
1991	Vaidehi Vanthachu	Karuppa	
1992	Pondatti Rajyam	Krishnan	
1992	Abhirami	Saravanan	
1993	Maamiyar Veedu	Aravind	
1993	Suriyan Chandiran	Marudhu	
1993	Pettredutha Pillai	Kumar	
1993	Nallathe Nadakkum	Prakash	
1993	Parvathi Ennai Paradi	Siva	
1993	Akkarai Cheemayile	Prakash	
1993	Muthupandi	Muthupandi	
1994	Veettai Paaru Naattai Paaru	Siva	
1994	Sevatha Ponnu	Chellappa	
1994	Thaai Manasu	Chinna Marudhu	
1996	Thirumbi Paar	Veeraiyan	
1996	Vishwanath	Vishwanath	Also producer
1997	Thambi Durai	Thambi Durai	
1998	Santosham	Indran	Also producer
1998	Ponmaanai Thedi	Sundaram	
2001	Nandhaa	Durai	
2003	Thayumanavan	Senbagapandian & Duraipandian	Double role Also director
2007	Paruthiveeran	Chevvaazhai	Filmfare Award for Best Supporting Actor – Tamil; Nominated, Vijay Award for Best Supporting Actor
2007	Veeramum Eeramum	Shankar Ayya	
2009	Azhagar Malai		Special appearance
2009	Pinju Manasu	Thulasi	
2010	Vilai	DCP Shanmugavel	
2011	Thambi Vettothi Sundaram	Salai	
2011	Gurusamy	Karuppu Sami	Special appearance
2012	Orange	Thevar	Malayalam film
2013	Alex Pandian	Parthiban	
2013	Keeripulla	Naaga	
2014	Aranmanai	Ayyanar	
2016	Meenakshi Kadhalan Elangovan	A. Saamy	
2016	Sowkarpettai	Senior	
2016	Enakku Innoru Per Irukku	"Naina" Doss	
2017	Pandigai	Muni	
2018	Kadaikutty Singam	Thamarai Manala Sendayar	
2018	Kolamavu Kokila	Guru	
2019	Oviyavai Vitta Yaru	Annachi	
2019	100	Ganesh	
2021	3:33	Kathir's father	
2021	Kaayam		
2021	Anandham Vilayadum Veedu	Kasi	
2022	Marutha	Maruthapandi	
2022	Gargi	Saravanan	
2023	Naan Kadavul Illai	Veerappan	
2023	Jailer	Seenu	
2023	Vivasayi Ennum Naan		
2023	Kapil Returns		
2023	Aayiram Porkaasukal	Animuthu	
2024	Kumbaari		
2024	Lover	Arun's father	
2024	Pambattam		
2024	Turbo	CM Arivazhagan	Malayalam film
2024	Raayan	Durai	
2024	Sir	Ponnarasan	
2024	Iravinil Aatam Par		
2025	Kuzhanthaigal Munnetra Kazhagam		
2025	Thotram		
2025	Thalaivan Thalaivii	Sembaiyya	
2025	Kumaara Sambavam		
2025	Mirage	Rajkumar	Malayalam film
2025	Kutram Thavir	Manivasagam	
2026	With Love	Swaminathan	
2026	Police Family	Dhana	
2026	Lakshmikanthan Kolai Vazhakku	Sargunam	

=== Television ===
Year	Programme / Show	Role	Channel	Notes
2019	Bigg Boss Tamil 3	Contestant; Ejected (Day 44)	Star Vijay	Reality TV Series
2023	Mahanadhi	Santhanam	Star Vijay	Special appearance
2025	Suzhal: The Vortex	Inspector Moorthy	Amazon Prime Video	Season 2
2025	Sattamum Neethiyum	Sundaramoorthy	ZEE5	
