= Kaalam Maari Pochu (1996 film) =

1996 film by V. Sekhar

- Poster
- Directed by: V. Sekhar
- Written by: V. Sekhar
- Produced by: C. Kannappan; S. S. Durairaju; S. Tamilselvi; S. Jeyalakshmi
- Starring: Pandiarajan; Sangita; Vadivelu; Kovai Sarala; R. Sundarrajan; Rekha
- Cinematography: G. Rajendran
- Edited by: A. P. Manivannan
- Music by: Deva
- Production company: Thiruvalluvar Kalaikkoodam
- Release date: 13 April 1996
- Running time: 155 minutes
- Country: India
- Language: Tamil

Kaalam Maari Pochu (transl. The times have changed) is a 1996 Indian Tamil-language comedy film directed by V. Sekhar. The film stars Pandiarajan, Sangita, Vadivelu, Kovai Sarala, R. Sundarrajan and Rekha. It was released on 13 April 1996, and ran for 175 days in theatres. The film was remade in Kannada as Ellara Mane Dosenu.

== Plot ==
Sadagopan and Meenakshi have four daughters and a son. Sadagopan considers the son is an asset to him and his real heir, while daughters are a burden on his head. Sadagopan searches grooms for his educated three elder daughters with the help of his Iyer priest friend. He is upset that he cannot find grooms for his daughters unless he is ready to offer them at least forty sovereigns of gold each. Sadagoppan wants to marry his daughters to grooms who do not require any dowry. He somehow finds out three under qualified grooms meeting his dowry conditions such as Murugesan a marriage catering cook for elder daughter Lakshmi, Sekar a Corporation pesticide-spraying worker for second daughter Sundari and an auto-rickshaw driver Muthupandi for his third daughter Indira. He forces his decision on his daughters to marry only them caring neither about whether they are right match for their daughters either in terms of qualification or job nor his daughters' refusal to marry them. His third daughter Indra strongly resists his decision of the wedding proposals of her sisters along with Meenakshi. Indira insists that she has to meet her groom personally to find whether he is a proper match for her, and only she will accept him. Sadagopan actually lies to Indra that her groom is actually a businessman running an automobile shop so that she will marry him, which as otherwise a storm will erupt if she knows her groom's real job. The first two daughters marry their groom reluctantly, but Indra is however satisfied with her would be husband. However, Indra is infuriated when she learns the truth about Muthupandi. All the three women move into their husbands' houses. Although no dowry was paid, the three wayward husbands want to rely on their wives' property and ask for money to start their own businesses, to which their wives agree.

Sadagopan's son is very selfish, and he does not want to share his father's property among his sisters. Sadagopan also supports him out of blind love for the male child. The three women suffer mentally amidst son only loving father, selfish brother and greedy husbands who care least about any of the feelings of the daughter or sister or wife. Sadagopan's son marries a powerful politician's daughter. At the wedding, the husbands Muthupandi, Sekar and Murugesan feel insulted and quarrel. They were insulted and told to leave the wedding hall, further angering them. They vent out their frustration and anger on their respective wives and compel them to bring money from their parents' home. This brings up quarrels between the three couples. Meenakshi promises them that she will talk to her husband and arrange the money. An unexpected twist comes when her son cunningly tries to inherit all the properties in his name, taking advantage of his father's blind love, shocking Meenakshi. She vigorously fights for her daughters' rights, which falls in to deaf ears. Her outrage causes her fatal brain damage. Sadagopan is upset that his son is so loyal to his in-laws and never cares about his house and also refuses to accommodate his pregnant elder sister in their house as her labour date nears. Sadagopan slowly realises his son's true colours and the mistake he did with the marriage decision of his three daughters. He decides to marry off his last daughter to someone well qualified and well doing, unlike he did for his other daughters, so that at least she gets a happy life. This infuriates his son when he learns that Sadagopan is going to spend the money for his last daughter from the property, which he considers to be his. This creates a fight between father and son, and he expels Sadagopan and his sister from his home.

Indra, Lakshmi and Sundari file a petition in court for a rightful share of their father's property, further angering their brother. However, on advice of his father-in-law, he pretends to come to a smooth agreement with them that he will spend the money for their sister's wedding in exchange for the signature of withdrawing the case and forgoing their rightful share of their father's property. Indra is aware that he is cunning, and she stops everyone from accepting it. The three husbands change their minds and realise their mistake of being greedy. They support their wives to conduct the wedding at any cost.

The brother disrupts the wedding day and wants to stop the wedding unless the sisters sign the agreement. He even kicks his pregnant sister and frantically attacks all the other sisters, including the bride. Sadagopan is enraged by this, so he beats his son frantically to kill him. The sisters stop him and shout that he is the reason for their brother to behave like this. The daughters shout at him for being so biased against them since their childhoods and for him. He is one who has spoiled his son and raised him without any respect and love for his sisters. Sadagopan and his son realise their mistakes for being so biased and greedy respectively. They both have now understood that daughters are not inferior to sons and have all the rights even after marriage. All the men finally reunite with the sisters and conduct the wedding of the fourth daughter happily.

== Cast ==
- Pandiarajan as Muthupandi
- Sangita as Indra
- Vadivelu as Sekar
- Kovai Sarala as Sundari
- R. Sundarrajan as Murugesan
- Rekha as Lakshmi
- Raj Chander
- Vinu Chakravarthy as Sadagopan
- Vennira Aadai Moorthy as Iyer
- Vadivukkarasi as Meenakshi
- Oru Viral Krishna Rao as Muthupandi's father
- Shanmugasundari as Rangamma, Sekar's mother
- Kalidoss as an MLA
- Idichapuli Selvaraj as a marriage broker
- Bonda Mani as Sekar's coworker
- Jayamani as Sekar's coworker
- LIC Narasimhan as an Advocate
- Kovai Senthil as a marriage broker
- Bayilvan Ranganathan as a garment factory owner
- MLA Thangaraj as A police officer
- Vijay Ganesh as MLA's sidekick

== Soundtrack ==
The soundtrack was composed by Deva. Vadivelu sang the song "Vaadi Pottapulla" on Deva's recommendation, over the objections of Deva's assistants. The song was recreated by FoxN as "Vaadi Chellakutty" for the 2026 film Love Oh Love.

Song	Singer(s)	Lyrics	Duration
"Achcham Ennadi"	K. S. Chithra	Vaali	4:29
"Punnagai Raniye" (duet)	Mano, Krishnaraj, K. S. Chithra	Vairamuthu	5:01
"Punnagai Raniye" (solo)	S. P. Balasubrahmanyam, Sindhu	Vairamuthu	5:01
"Thavil Adida"	S. P. Balasubrahmanyam	Vaali	4:30
"Vaadi Pottapulla Veliye"	Vadivelu	Vaali	4:18

== Reception ==
The Hindu wrote "Known for dealing, with an expert touch, middle-class family stories, director V. Sekar comes up trumps in Tiruvalluvar Kalai Koodam's Kaalam Maari Pochchu. This time three married couples are the central figures in his story, for which he has also written the screenplay and dialogue, the director excelling in the last mentioned department also." Vadivelu won the Tamil Nadu State Film Award for Best Comedian.
