= Neengalum Herothan =

- Poster
- Directed by: V. Sekhar
- Written by: V. Sekhar
- Produced by: C. Muthuramalinga; P. Thangadurai
- Starring: Nizhalgal Ravi; Silk Smitha; Goundamani; Senthil
- Cinematography: K.B. Dhayalan
- Edited by: R. Bhaskaran
- Music by: Gangai Amaran
- Production company: Thoothukudi Cine Creations
- Release date: 25 May 1990
- Running time: 139 minutes
- Country: India
- Language: Tamil

Neengalum Herothan (transl. You too are a hero) is a 1990 Indian Tamil-language satirical film written and directed by V. Sekhar in his directorial debut. The film was produced by C. Muthuramalingam, P. Thangadurai under Thoothukudi Cine Creations. It stars Nizhalgal Ravi, Silk Smitha, Goundamani and Senthil, with K. K. Soundar and Vasu Vikram portraying supporting roles. The film was released on 25 May 1990.

== Plot ==
In a village where all the villagers doing their daily activities get excited when a film crew comes to shoot in their village. The story revolves on multiple characters, A Fan Club in that village run by a jobless youth named Rattan Raj (Vasu Vikram) which is dedicated to the hero Tiger Premnath (Nizhalgal Ravi) who comes for the shoot, Two village drama artists Pavadaisaamy (Goundamani) and Pakkirisaamy (Senthil) who aspires to become cinema actors. A naive village girl Raani (Lalitha Kumari) who is starstruck by the actors and the humble villager Kaaliappan (Ram Manohar) who is loved by his future wife Kannathaa (Divya).

M.N. Nambiar and P.S.Veerappa arrive to the village but they are shunned by the villagers due to the fact that they are villains in cinema. In reality they are the most nicest people, they won't get a place to stay due to that.

The hero Tiger Premnath arrives to the village for the shooting of a village movie called Vivasai Magan. He impresses the villagers by his noble deeds, he even gives an advice to an alcoholic to quit alcoholism as he is a teetotaler not only in the movies but in real life. His duality would be exposed when Kaaliappan sees the sight of Tiger Premnath sexually assaulting Ponni (Ratna). Tiger Premnath tries to pay him off, but to no avail. Kaaliappan becomes helpless as he cannot reveal the heroes' true colours, he would get into a fight with the fan club because he would accuse Tiger Premnath as a rogue which enrages the fanboys. When summoned by the Panchayat President K. K. Soundar he would still accuse Tiger Premnath in front of everyone, but since Ponni had requested Kaaliappan not to tell anyone, because her marriage would be stopped and he refuses to tell the reason to which he would be banished in the village. Due to this Kannatha thinks that he hates her. The producer and the director advises Tiger Premnath not to get involved in this as it would cause his image to get spoiled by the press. Tiger Premnath insults the director, producer including M.N.Nambiar and P.S.Veerappa.

The director would shoot a scene involving a Bull charging at Tiger Premnath and his wife as an act of revenge by Nambiar. When the Panchayat President checks on the cowshed he would see the bull is still there and the shepherd would say that he had given the stunt master the uncontrollable bull which could be tamed by Tiger Premnath because he had fought tigers in the movies. The Panchayat president tells him that cinema actors don't do stunts for real, they just fake it for the audience. When the scene is getting shot the bull attacks Tiger Premnath and he runs away in fear until Kaaliappan tames the bull but gets hurt in the process. The producer would offer Kaaliappan money but he would refuse it.

Silk Smitha would be the centre attraction for all the old people who would constantly chase her everywhere. Raani aspires to be something like her but Silk Smitha advises her not to follow her footsteps because the industry is such a place that you cannot survive as a commoner, hearing this Raani's mother would apologise to her for insulting her that day.

The hero would be feted in a Religious function, where his fans would equate him to a king in a song. This inspires Tiger Premnath to jump into politics, he then mocks the people claiming them to be idiots and they don't know to differentiate between cinema and reality.

The Fan club decides to inaugurate their newly built fan club by sticking posters and banners of welcoming Tiger Premnath to the event. When Muthu (Ganeshkar) decides to tie the banner near the electric pole, he gets electrocuted and dies. Mike (Chinni Jayanth) requests Tiger Premnath to attend the funeral, he would ridicule the fact that it was the boys fault that he died not because of me. To avoid attending the funeral he tells his assistant to lie to the fan club members that Tiger Premnath on hearing the news he suffered a chest pain and he is taking rest.

When the hero leaves back to Madras, he would spot Ponni walking on the way and would talk disgustingly to her, to which she would slap him. In return he decides to rape her, Rattan Raj and his friend would see the commotion and get shocked to see that their hero is like this. Tiger Premnath kicks them and drives away with the girl, the girl jumps out of the car and tries to escape when Kaaliappan saves her and trashes him. Rattan Raj would mobilise the villagers to attack Tiger Premnath to which he begs to Kaaliappan to save him. Then the school headmaster gives a big advice to people that don't think your life is like cinema and because of this cinema actors take advantage of you foolishness. Tiger Premnath apologises to the villagers for his bad deeds.

== Cast ==
- Nizhalgal Ravi as 'Tiger' Premnath
- Silk Smitha as Silk Smitha
- Rammanohar as Kaaliappan
- Rathna as Ponni
- Goundamani as Paavada Samy / Paavada Kanth
- Senthil as Pakkiri Samy / Pakkiri Kanth
- M. N Nambiyar as himself
- P. S. Veerappa as himself
- K. K. Soundar as Village president
- Vasu Vikram as Rathanraj
- Ganeshkar as Muthu
- Pasi Narayanan as a Villager
- Theni Kunjarammal as Cinema paati
- Kovai Senthil as Flower seller
- Chinni Jayanth as Michael (Premnath's sidekick)
- Lalitha Kumari as Rani
- S. N. Parvathi as Village president's wife
- S. R. Veeraghavan as School teacher
- Tiruppur Ramasamy as a Villager
- V. Gowthaman as 'Tiger' Premnath's fan

Special appearances

- Super Subbarayan as Super Subbarayan
- Puliyur Saroja as Puliyur Saroja

== Production ==
The film marked the directorial debut of V. Sekhar who earlier assisted K. Bhagyaraj.

== Themes ==
The film was derived from Sekar's own experiences from his life where he wasted his time on films and fan clubs during his college days and the film spoke about it. The film also speaks about how a star's offscreen image would be completely different from his onscreen image.

== Soundtrack ==
Lyrics and songs were composed by Gangai Amaran.

Title	Singer(s)	Duration
"Neenga Illama" (Title song)	Gangai Amaran	1:50
"Rathirikku Thookkam Pochu"	K. S. Chithra, Mano	3:43
"Ezhu Ulagam Aandu Varum"	Deepan Chakravarthy, S. N. Surendar, Ilaya Gangai, S. P. Sailaja	4:31

== Reception ==
P. S. S. of Kalki praised the film's message.
