= Pinju Manasu =

- Directed by: D. Jairam
- Written by: D. Jairam
- Produced by: M. Elangovan
- Starring: Saravanan; Tharsha
- Cinematography: S. Bala
- Edited by: Joy; Sathish K. Kottai
- Music by: Indhiyan (Songs); S. P. Venkatesh (Score)
- Production company: Sree Elangovan Films
- Release date: 4 December 2009
- Running time: 135 minutes
- Country: India
- Language: Tamil

Pinju Manasu (transl. Child like heart), also known as Pinchu Manasu, is a 2009 Tamil language drama film directed by D. Jairam. The film stars Saravanan and newcomer Tharsha, with Nizhalgal Ravi, Bhuvana, Ganeshkar, Aarthi, Master Varun, Pasi Sathya and Kottai Perumal playing supporting roles. The film, produced by M. Elangovan, was released on 4 December 2009.

== Plot ==
Thulasi (Saravanan), an orphan, works as a peon in an engineering college. He and the college professor Devi (Tharsha), who hails from a rich family, fall in love with each other and they get married secretly. However, their marriage is rejected by Devi's father (Nizhalgal Ravi), a powerful minister, and the two then go live in Chennai. Six years later, Thulasi and Devi don't have children thus Devi feels depressed about it. Thereafter, Devi becomes pregnant and gives birth to a baby boy but the doctor tells them that Devi's womb was damaged after childbirth and she cannot have another child.

The years passed and they are now living happily with their seven-year-old son Kannan (Master Varun). Thulasi and Devi spoil Kannan, therefore, Kannan becomes an undisciplined kid. One day, Kannan bunks the classes and decides to spend his day outside. His school informs the couple that their kid had not shown up to school. Thulasi and Devi then desperately search for him. Meanwhile, some people take advantage of Kannan's innocence: Kannan is forced to beg by rowdies and he is even kidnapped by child traffickers. Kannan is then adopted by an old couple who have no children (Kottai Perumal and Pasi Sathya) and they take care of him. But as the days passed by, the police tell the parents that the chance to find their kid had decreased. In the meantime, the child traffickers kidnap him once again but Kannan manages to escape. A wounded and starving Kannan enters his house in the middle of the night and starts eating the food he has found in the kitchen. Thulasi and Devi are awakened by the noise and find their son in a pitiful state. The food eaten by Kannan was poisonous, the couple was so devastated after the loss of the child that they decided to commit suicide. The film ends with Kannan dying in the lap of his helpless parents.

== Cast ==
- Saravanan as Thulasi
- Tharsha as Devi
- Nizhalgal Ravi as Devi's father
- Bhuvana as Devi's mother
- Ganeshkar as Suman
- Aarthi as Hema
- Master Varun as Kannan
- Pasi Sathya
- Kottai Perumal
- Maaran as Child trafficker
- Muthukaalai as Child trafficker
- Nellai Siva as Annachi
- Bayilvan Ranganathan
- Kottai Kumar
- Kovai Senthil as Rickshaw puller
- Vellai Subbaiah as Autorickshaw driver
- Seth Govindhan
- Baby Keerthika
- Baby Deepika
- Master Dileep Kumar
- R. Sundarrajan in a guest appearance
- D. Jairam in a cameo appearance

== Production ==
D. Jairam made his directorial debut with the drama film Pinju Manasu under the banner of Sree Elangovan Films. Saravanan was chosen to play the male lead while newcomer Tharsha from Singapore was selected to play the heroine. Indhiyan composed the music and S. Bala took care of camera work.

== Soundtrack ==
Pinju Manasu

Soundtrack album by Indhiyan
- Released: 2009
- Recorded: 2009
- Genre: Feature film soundtrack
- Length: 20:13
- Producer: Indhiyan

The soundtrack was composed by Indhiyan. The soundtrack, released in 2009, features 5 tracks with lyrics written by D. Jairam, V. G. Seenivasan and Pushkin Rajkumar.

Track	Song	Duration
1	"Kalyanama Kalyanam"	2:49
2	"Thaai Enbathu"	4:36
3	"Udhal Urugi Vaaduthe"	3:33
4	"Duli Pappa"	4:22
5	"Ulagathe Purinjikoda"	4:53
