= Suryaputhri =

- சூரியபுத்திரி
- Genre: Soap opera
- Directed by: Tamizh Bharati
- Creative director: Keerthana
- Starring: Kutty Padmini; Nizhalgal Ravi; Santhoshi; Lavanya; Rajkumar
- Theme music composer: D. Imman (title song)
- Country of origin: India
- Original language: Tamil
- No. of seasons: 1
- No. of episodes: 448

Production
- Producers: Kutty Padmini; Kirtana Fanning
- Camera setup: Multi-camera
- Running time: approx. 20-22 minutes per episode
- Production company: Vaishnavi Media Works Limited

Original release
- Network: Kalaignar TV
- Release: 5 March 2012 – 19 June 2014

Suryaputhri (Tamil: சூரியபுத்திரி) is a Tamil soap opera that aired on Kalaignar TV. The show premiered on 5 March 2012 and aired Monday through Thursday at 10:00PM IST. Later the show was shifted to the 12:30PM and 8:30PM time slot. The show starred Kutty Padmini, Nizhalgal Ravi, Santhoshi, Lavanya, and Rajkumar. It was produced by Vaishnavi Media Works Limited's Kutty Padmini and directed by Tamizh Bharati with Keerthana as the creative director. The music was composed by D. Imman. The show last aired on 19 June 2014 and ended with 448 episodes.

This serial re-telecast on same Channel on only Singapore and Malaysia from December 2016, airs Monday to Friday at 9:30PM.

== Cast ==
Main cast

- Kutty Padmini
- Nizhalgal Ravi
- Santhoshi
- Lavanya as Khirushna
- Rajkumar

Additional cast

- Raja
- A.R.S
- Arya
- Nepal
- Sridevi
- Srivithya
- Deepa
- Suja
- Divya Krishnan

Former cast

- Sudha Chandran

== Airing history ==
The show started airing on Kalaignar TV on 5 March 2012. It aired on Monday through Thursday at 10PM IST. Later its timing changed, and it was shifted to the 12:30PM and 9:30PM time slot.
