= Bharathi (2000 film) =

- Poster
- Directed by: Gnana Rajasekaran
- Written by: Gnana Rajasekaran
- Produced by: Sujatha; M. Varadaraja; K. Maniprasad
- Starring: Sayaji Shinde; Devayani; Nizhalgal Ravi; Ramesh Kumar
- Cinematography: Thangar Bachan
- Edited by: B. Lenin; V. T. Vijayan
- Music by: Ilayaraja
- Production company: Media Dreams
- Distributed by: Media Dreams
- Release date: 1 September 2000
- Running time: 149 minutes
- Country: India
- Language: Tamil
- Budget: ₹1.5 crore

Bharathi is a 2000 Indian Tamil-language biographical film based on the life of Subramania Bharati starring Sayaji Shinde, Devayani and Nizhalgal Ravi. The film was directed by Gnana Rajasekaran and won the National Film Award for Best Feature Film in Tamil for the year 2000.

== Plot ==
It is a biographical film based on the life of Tamil poet Subramania Bharati.

== Cast ==
- Sayaji Shinde as Subramania Bharathi (Voice dubbed by Rajeev)
  - Pushpak Ramesh as young Subramania Bharathi
- Devayani as Chellamal, Bharathi’s wife (Voice dubbed by Jayageetha)
- Ramesh Kumar as Subramania Bharathi's friend
- Arthi Danabal as Subramania Bharathi‘s youngest daughter
- Nizhalgal Ravi as S. P. Y. Surendranath Arya
- T. P. Gajendran as Kuvalai Kannan
- Srikanth as Chinnaswami Iyer, Bharathi’s father
- Junior Balaiah
- Delhi Kumar
- Balu Anand
- Bala Singh
- Kumar Natarajan
- Amarasigamani
- Ganesh Babu as Bharathi's son-in-law

== Production ==
During his days as a district collector, Gnana Rajasekaran was invited as guest for an event where a student suggested him to make a film on poet Subramania Bharati which created a spark in him and went to Coimbatore and read books about him. The director wanted to cast Kamal Haasan in the lead role, but the film's budget did not allow it. So he chose Marathi actor Sayaji Shinde, who made his debut in Tamil cinema. The dubbing voice for Shinde was given by actor Rajeev.

The female lead role was initially offered to actress Suvalakshmi, whose refusal prompted the team to sign on Devayani. The filming was held at locations like Kadaya, Ettayapuram, Kasi and Pondicherry. The film's budget was 1 1/2 crores.

== Soundtrack ==
The music was composed by Ilaiyaraaja. The song "Ethilum Ingu" was set in Rasika Ranjani, whereas "Nirpadhuve" is set in Kalyani raga. The audio was launched at Park Sheraton Hotel, Chennai. Sajahan Waheed of New Straits Times wrote "Isaignani Illayaraja showcases his three-decade experience in the Tamil music industry thorough this brilliant effort".

All lyrics are written by Subramania Bharati (Except noted).

Track listing
No.	Title	Lyrics	Singers	Length
1.	"Agini Kunjondru"		K. J. Yesudas
2.	"Baratha Samuthayam"		K. J. Yesudas
3.	"Ethilum Ingu"	Pulamaipithan	Madhu Balakrishnan
4.	"French Music"		Ilaiyaraaja
5.	"Keladaa Manida"		Rajkumar Bharathi
6.	"Mayil Pola Ponnu onnu"	Mu. Metha	Bhavatharini
7.	"Nallathor Veenai"		Ilaiyaraaja, Mano
8.	"Ninnaichcharan Adainthen"		Bombay Jayashree
9.	"Ninnaichcharan"		Ilaiyaraaja
10.	"Nirpathuve Nadapathuve"		Harish Raghavendra
11.	"Vante Matharam"		Madhu Balakrishnan

== Reception ==
Malathi Rangarajan of The Hindu said, "THE MAJESTIC GAIT, the intimidating, piercing eyes that sparkle with a mix of eccentricity, anger, defiance and passion – Shayaji Shinde is indeed a remarkable choice for the role of Bharati" and "It is another fantastic break for Devyani as Chellamma, the wife of Subramania Bharati. Her soft, vulnerable docility and her helpless effete submission to her husband's impractical way of life have been beautifully portrayed". Rediff.com said, "Sayaji Shinde as Bharati is simply splendid. His is an impressive performance, with nary an inkling of the trepidation that he is enacting Bharati's role -- he, a Maharashtrian and Tamil, an alien tongue". Tamil Star wrote "Bharathi" may not be a commercial success. All said and done, with its superior quality it is certain that the film is bound to bag plenty of awards in near future".

Seetha Ravi of Kalki praised the acting of Shinde and other actors, Ilaiyaraaja's music, Thangar Bachan's cinematography and Krishnamoorthy's art direction. Dinakaran wrote "The events that happened in Bharathi's life are as unlimited as the ocean. From among them the particular aspect of how Bharathi braved the burning situation of personal poverty by facing it's challenges as a undisputed king of the world of poetry is beautifully narrated in this film. What has been told in this by director Gnanasekaran has been narrated in an excellent manner. He has won a diamond crown for his career through this film. Through his melodious, musical scores, music director Ilayaraja has given his heart-felt respect to Bharathi, the poetic genius. The cameraman Thangarbachchaan has brought before our eyes the very period of Bharathi's life". K. N. Vijiyan of New Straits Times wrote "This film will satisfy those who have been lamenting the lack of good subjects in Tamil movies and quench the curiosity of those fascinated by Bharathi's poems".
