= Naan Petha Magane =

- Poster
- Directed by: V. Sekhar
- Written by: V. Sekhar
- Produced by: Tamilselvi Sekhar
- Starring: Manorama; Nizhalgal Ravi; Radhika; Urvashi
- Cinematography: G. Rajendran
- Edited by: A. P. Manivannan
- Music by: Chandrabose
- Production company: Manithalayam
- Release date: 15 January 1995
- Running time: 127 minutes
- Country: India
- Language: Tamil

Naan Petha Magane (transl. My Dear Son) is a 1995 Indian Tamil-language drama film directed by V. Sekhar. The film stars Manorama, Nizhalgal Ravi, Radhika and Urvashi. It was released on 15 January 1995. Although initially received with some protest, the film went on to become a major hit at the box office. It won the Tamil Nadu State Film Award for Best Film Portraying Women in a Good Light.

== Plot ==
Ravi (Nizhalgal Ravi) owns a small advertising agency and is the only son of Andal (Manorama), who is very possessive of him. Ravi meets Indra (Radhika), an open-minded lawyer, and they fall in love. Andal dislikes Indra, fearing that she might come between mother and son, as Indra often speaks out against gender/social inequalities. Andal disapproves of their plan to marry. Ravi has no option but to renounce his love for Indra. Instead, Andal arranges Ravi’s marriage to a naïve village girl, Uma Maheswari (Urvashi), who grew up without a mother. Meanwhile, neighbour Varadarajan, a lawyer like Indra, is known for mistreating his wife, Devi, and his mother. He is deep in debt and brings Chinnakalapa and his son to his house regarding a case. Chinnakalapa and his son are known to be wealthy in their village, and they befriend Andal.

Ravi, although not interested in this wedding proposal with Uma, goes through with it for the sake of his mother. Slowly, Ravi builds a good relationship with Uma and they start to lead a happy life. But Andal feels possessive about Ravi and fears Uma will start dominating her. She picks frequent quarrels with Uma, and Ravi worries that all is not well between them, but he convinces Uma to tolerate Andal’s behavior. Andal attempts to commit suicide and is saved by Chinnakalapa. Uma becomes depressed.

Andal begins to understand that her possessiveness towards Ravi is the only reason for all the trouble in her home and decides to apologize to Uma after a huge quarrel which drove Ravi from the house. It is too late, as Uma is so affected by the continuous nagging from Andal and lack of moral support from Ravi that she commits suicide. Andal is arrested on the grounds of suspected murder after being accused by Varadarajan's wife Devi. At this point, Varadarajan appears as prosecution against Andal in court, and Indra comes to the rescue, appearing on behalf of Andal. Varadarajan and Devi discover a letter written by Uma stating that she is going to commit suicide, which proves this was not a murder. Varadarajan instructs Devi not to mention this in court; however, Devi, guilt-ridden, reveals the letter to Indra during the trial and admits that she did not see Andal kill Uma, angering Varadarajan. Indra then explains that the reason Uma died was because of Andal and Uma's quarrelling over Ravi and that Andal could have been more accepting towards Uma. Andal is acquitted from the case but feels guilty that she is responsible for Uma’s death, and she weeps and refuses to go home despite Ravi, Indra, Chinnakalpa, Chinnakalpa's son, Devi and everyone's pleas out of respect for Uma. The movie ends with a message that mothers should not be over-possessive with their sons, especially when the sons are newly-married.

== Cast ==
- Manorama as Aandal
- Nizhalgal Ravi as Ravi
- Radhika as Indra
- Urvashi as Uma Maheswari
- Goundamani as K. D. Varadarajan
- Senthil as Chinnakalpa
- Vadivelu as Chinnakalpa's son
- Kovai Sarala as Devi
- V. Gopalakrishnan as Indra's father
- Kumarimuthu
- Shanmugasundari as Sundari
- C. K. Saraswathi as K. D. Varadarajan's Mother
- Theni Kunjarammal as Maragatham
- Nithya Ravindran
- Radhabai
- P.S Seethalakshmi
- Gemini Rajeshwari
- Idichapuli Selvaraj
- Bonda Mani
- Thideer Kannaiah as Nair
- Major Sundarrajan as Judge

== Soundtrack ==
The soundtrack was composed by Chandrabose, with lyrics written by Vaali.

Song	Singer(s)	Duration
"Mannathi Mannanum"	S. Janaki	2:30
"Manja Kuruviyai"	S. P. Balasubrahmanyam, Padma	4:06
"Manichudunga"	S. P. Balasubrahmanyam, K. S. Chithra	3:53

== Bibliography ==
- Rajadhyaksha, Ashish; Willemen, Paul (1998) [1994]. Encyclopaedia of Indian Cinema. British Film Institute and Oxford University Press. ISBN 0-19-563579-5.
