= Onna Irukka Kathukanum =

1992 movie by V. Sekhar

- DVD cover
- Directed by: V. Sekhar
- Written by: V. Sekhar
- Produced by: C. Kannappan; S. S. Durairaju; S. Tamilselvi; R. Vijay
- Starring: Sivakumar
- Cinematography: G. Rajendran
- Edited by: A. P. Manivannan
- Music by: Ilaiyaraaja
- Production company: Thiruvalluvar Kalaikoodam
- Release date: 20 November 1992
- Running time: 155 minutes
- Country: India
- Language: Tamil

Onna Irukka Kathukanum (transl. We must learn to live together) is a 1992 Indian Tamil language comedy drama film directed by V. Sekhar. The film stars Sivakumar, while an ensemble supporting cast includes Manorama, Vinu Chakravarthy, Goundamani, Senthil, S. S. Chandran, Charle, Kovai Sarala, Supergood Kannan and Jeeva, amongst others. It was released on 20 November 1992.

== Plot ==
The story begins with a group of government officers coming to list the number of devastated houses. The officers promised them to give a big amount to build their house but in exchange for a little amount to register their names. So the illiterate villagers, who want to make easy money, demolish their house. The officers turn out to be frauds. The village panchayat president knows that the villagers will not interfere in his decision until they are uneducated. Sivaraman, a new school teacher, tries to change their custom and the children are happy to learn at school. Soon, Sivaraman has trouble with the village head.

== Cast ==
- Sivakumar as Sivaraman
- Manorama
- Vinu Chakravarthy as President
- Goundamani as Sudalai
- Senthil as Pichumani (Beggar Bell)
- S. S. Chandran as Venkatraman Iyer
- Charle as Issaki
- Kovai Sarala as Kaathayi
- Supergood Kannan as Kaathayi's Brother
- Jeeva as Rasathi
- Kumarimuthu as Pavadai
- Tirupur Ramasamy
- K.K.Soundar as Andiappan
- Idichapuli Selvaraj
- MLA Thangaraj
- Chelladurai
- Suryakanth
- Kovai Senthil
- Master Sirajudeen as Venkatraman Iyer's son

== Production ==
Sekhar revealed the film's concept came from his childhood where he befriended a poor boy which was not liked by his parents and this discrimination led him to make a film on this theme.

== Soundtrack ==
The music was composed by Ilaiyaraaja.

Song	Singer(s)	Lyrics	Duration
"Eyzhu Malai Saami"	Gangai Amaran, Malaysia Vasudevan, T. S. Raghavendra, Deepan Chakravarthy	Gangai Amaran	4:45
"Kaathalunna Unga Veettu"	Malaysia Vasudevan, Swarnalatha, Minmini, Gangai Amaran	Piraisoodan	4:46
"Kaththukkanum Kaththukkanum"	Malaysia Vasudevan, Sunandha, Sundarrajan, T. S. Raghavendra	Gangai Amaran	5:08
"Manusanai Theru Theruvaa"	Gangai Amaran	Pulamaipithan	3:46
"Naalai Thalaivan"	Mano	Pulamaipithan	4:57
"Samaththuvam Intha"	Malaysia Vasudevan, Kovai Soundararajan, Krishnamoorthy	Vaali	5:07

== Reception ==
Malini Mannath of The Indian Express said "Onna Irukka Kathukanum may not be slick, but it has a message to deliver. It has been told with warmth and humour".
