= Vairamani =

Village in India

Vairamani Vairamoni
- Village
- Country: India
- State: Kerala
- District: Idukki

Government
  - Type: Panchayath

Languages
  - Official: Malayalam
- Time zone: UTC+5:30 (IST)
- PIN: 685505
- Telephone code: 04869
- Vehicle registration: KL-37
- Nearest cities: Kattappana
- Lok Sabha constituency: Idukki

Vairamani also spelled as Vairamoni was a village in Idukki district of Kerala. The village was submerged in water in 1974 when the reservoir of the Idukki Dam was filled with water.

== History ==
Due to food shortages during the period of C. P. Ramaswami Iyer, people were given 5 acres of land each as part of the decision to lease out the swamps. These villages were rich in paddy cultivation. After Indian independence the village became part of Idukki district of Kerala. The subsequent Communist government came to power after formation of Kerala state gave the land to the families.

Vairamani, the main town between Thodupuzha and Kattappana was a commercial center of the nearby villages of Kuthirakuthi, Mayyanna, Kayanattupara, Venganam, Churuli, Ktavara, Muthikandam and Nadakkavayal. Before the village was completely evicted more than 2000 families lived here. Before the construction of the dam, there was a motorable road through the forest to Kattappana via Vairamani. The village was submerged in water in 1974 when the reservoir of the Idukki Dam was filled with water. The families there were resettled in Vannappuram, Chalakudy, Manjapra, Koruthodu and Chelachuvad areas. Each family was given 3 acres of land. The Christian church St. Thomas' Church in Vairamani, which was more than a hundred years old, was renamed St. Mary's Church and later relocated to Kulamavu.

== Current status ==
The remnants of the village such as the floors of St. Thomas' Church which was more than a hundred years old, houses and shops can be seen in summer when the water level in the dam drops below 15 percentage. Vairamoni is now an islet formed in the Idukki Reservoir within the Idukki Wildlife Sanctuary. This islet, without human intervention, is being turned into a breeding ground for many birds in the summer months. Currently, to reach Vairamani, one has to travel by boat for three and a half hours from Kulamavu through the reservoir.

Kulamavu Forest Station is marked as Vairamani Forest Station in the records.
