= V. Sekhar =

Indian filmmaker (1951 or 1952 – 2025)

- Born: 1951 or 1952; Neivanatham, North Arcot district, Madras State (now in Tiruvannamalai district, Tamil Nadu), India
- Died: 14 November 2025 (aged 73); Chennai, Tamil Nadu, India
- Occupations: Film director, writer
- Years active: 1987–2014
- Children: 2

V. Sekhar (1951 or 1952 – 14 November 2025) was an Indian film director and writer who worked primarily in Tamil cinema.

== Early life and career ==
Sekhar was born in a village called Neivanatham near Tiruvannamalai. After completing B. A. and P. U. C. at Tiruvannamalai, Sekar briefly worked as Malaria Eradication Worker at Corporation Health Department. On the insistence of B. Lenin, Sekar joined the film industry by assisting K. Bhagyaraj in films like Enga Chinna Rasa (1987). He made his directorial debut with Neengalum Herothan (1990).

He was primarily active in the 90s and early 2000s. Sekhar made immense contribution to the popularity of family drama films and TV shows. He always put a personal touch in his films which are loved by the viewers, especially the middle-class audiences. V Sekhar usually used mediocre backdrops in his movies, and mostly portrays middle-class households through his films. He strictly maintained that his screenplay doesn’t change from the very first draft. In his interviews, he confessed that for him, the story is the backbone of the movie.

He also worked with known comedian actors Goundamani, Senthil, Charle, Vivek, Vadivelu and Kovai Sarala.

The veteran directed about 18 Tamil films like Varavu Ettana Selavu Pathana (1994), Naan Petha Magane (1995), Kaalam Maari Pochu (1996) and Viralukketha Veekkam (1999) starring big names from the Tamil movie industry. He also directed a few TV shows namely Porantha Veeda Puguntha Veeda (2007–2008) which aired on Sun TV and Veetukku Veedu (2010–2011) which aired on Raj TV.

He began work on his latest venture in directing Saravana Poigai, starring his son Karl Marx in the lead role but the film remains unreleased. He was arrested on 12 August 2015, by the Idol Wing, Economic Offences Wing for suspected role in an idol smuggling racket.

== Style of work ==
Sekar directed mainly family-themed drama films, and was likened to Visu who did the same. He often produced his own films through the studio Thiruvalluvar Kalaikoodam alongside his business partner K. Parthiban.

== Death ==
Sekhar died on 14 November 2025, at the age of 73, after more than ten days of treatment in Sri Ramachandra Medical Centre in Porur, a locality in Chennai, Tamil Nadu.

== Filmography ==
=== Director ===
==== Films ====
Year	Film	Notes
1990	Neengalum Herothan	
1991	Naan Pudicha Mappillai	
1991	Pondatti Sonna Kettukanum	
1992	Onna Irukka Kathukanum	
1993	Porantha Veeda Puguntha Veeda	
1993	Parvathi Ennai Paradi	
1994	Varavu Ettana Selavu Pathana	
1995	Naan Petha Magane	
1996	Kaalam Maari Pochu	
1997	Pongalo Pongal	
1998	Ellame En Pondattithaan	
1999	Viralukketha Veekkam	
2000	Koodi Vazhnthal Kodi Nanmai	
2001	Veettoda Mappillai	
2002	Namma Veetu Kalyanam	
2003	Aalukkoru Aasai	
2010	Hendtheer Darbar	Kannada films

==== Television ====
- Porantha Veeda Puguntha Veeda (2007–2008) (Sun TV)
- Veetukku Veedu (2010–2011) (Raj TV)

=== Writer ===
- Ponnu Pakka Poren (1989) (screenplay)

=== Actor ===
- Pallikoodam (2007)
- Enga Raasi Nalla Raasi (2009)
