= Nizhalgal Ravi =

Indian actor and voice actor (born 1956)

Kalaimamani Nizhalgal Ravi
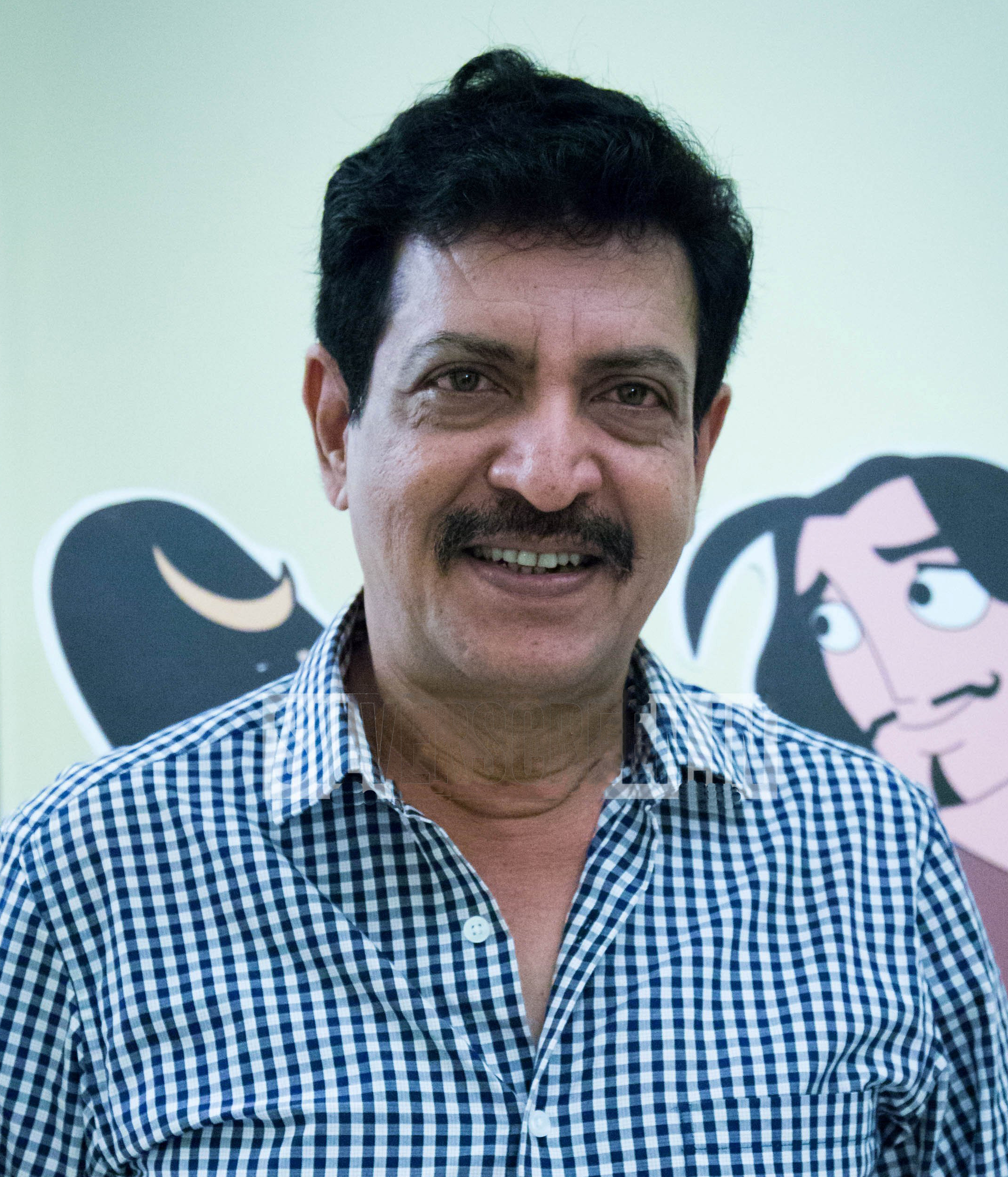
- Ravi at Ponniyin Selvan Press Meet
- Born: Ravichandran Samanna; 16 April 1956 (age 70); Coimbatore, Madras State (now Tamil Nadu), India
- Education: B.A-Economics,PSG College of Arts and Science.
- Occupations: Actor, Dubbing Artist
- Years active: 1980–present
- Works: Full list
- Spouse: Vishnupriya (m. 1986)
- Children: 1
- Awards: Kalaimamani Award (1992)

Ravichandran Samanna (born 16 April 1956), known professionally as Nizhalgal Ravi, is an Indian film, television and voice actor in Tamil cinema. He has also performed in Telugu and Malayalam films and television series. He started his career in 1980 with the film Nizhalgal. He has acted in more than 590 films. He is best known for his dubbing work for Amitabh Bachchan in Tamil.

== Education ==
Ravi completed his Bachelor of Arts majoring in economics from PSG College of Arts and Science, Coimbatore.

== Career ==
Nizhalgal Ravi started his career under the team of veteran director Bharathiraja in the Tamil film Nizhalgal (1980), which fetched him his sobriquet Nizhalgal. He has played many roles in movies like Chinna Thambi Periya Thambi (1987), Nayakan (1987), Vedham Pudhithu (1987), etc. He has acted in over 20 movies in Malayalam in the 80s before moving into mainstream Tamil movies. He paired with several leading actress Radhika, Radha, Gautami, Khushbu, Ramya Krishnan, Revathi, Urvashi, Bhanupriya, Amala, Ranjini, Seetha, Kanaka, Saranya Ponvannan, Kasthuri, Rohini.

Ravi acted in K. Balachander’s telefilm Rail Sneham in the late 80s and 90s. He became popular through this opportunity and went on to act in the same director's TV serial Jannal. He is also a seasoned voice artist having dubbed for many actors.

== Awards ==
- 1992: Received title of Kalaimamani Award by the Government of Tamil Nadu, which is the highest state honour in the field of Arts.

== Notable filmography ==
=== Films ===
- Nizhalgal (1980)
- Kakka (1982; Malayalam)
- Sri Raghavendrar (1985)
- Meenamaasathile Sooryan (1986)
- Chinna Thambi Periya Thambi (1987)
- Veendum Lisa (1987)
- Nayakan (1987)
- Vedham Pudhithu (1987)
- Mappillai (1989)
- Nyaya Tharasu (1989)
- Pathimoonam Number Veedu (1990)
- Adhisaya Manithan (1990)
- My Dear Marthandan (1990)
- Dharma Durai (1991)
- Annaamalai (1992)
- Singaravelan (1992)
- Marupadiyum (1993)
- Aasai (1995)
- Kuruthipunal (1995)
- Naan Petha Magane (1995)
- Indian (1996)
- Arunachalam (1997)
- Suryavamsam (1997)
- Bharathi (2000)
- Kushi (2000)
- Puthira Punithama (2000)
- Budget Padmanabhan (2000)
- Citizen (2001)
- Villain (2002)
- Thirumalai (2003)
- Singam (2010)
- Melvilasom (2011)
- Venghai (2011)
- Vanakkam Chennai (2013)
- Singam II (2013)
- Ratsasan (2018)
- Ponniyin Selvan: I (2022)
- Ponniyin Selvan: II (2023)
- Raakadhan (2023)
- Mark Antony (2023)
- Raththam (2023)
- Devil's Double Next Level (2025)
- Jana Nayagan (2026)

=== As voice actor ===
Year	Films	Actor	Notes
1989	Pudhu Pudhu Arthangal	Rahman	
1993	Captain Magal	Raja	
2008	Bommalattam	Nana Patekar	Tamil version only
2015	Yagavarayinum Naa Kaakka	Mithun Chakraborty	Tamil version only
2018	K.G.F: Chapter 1	Anant Nag	Tamil version only
2018	Thugs of Hindustan	Amitabh Bachchan	Tamil version only
2019	Kaappaan	Boman Irani	
2019	Sye Raa Narasimha Reddy	Amitabh Bachchan	Tamil version only
2019	Bigil	Jackie Shroff	
2019	Aladdin	Navid Negahban	Tamil version only

=== Television ===
Year	Title	Role	Channel	Language
	Appavukkaaga		Doordarshan	Tamil
1986	Nallador Veenai		Doordarshan	Tamil
1991	Rail Sneham		Doordarshan	Tamil
1995–1996	Rathri		ETV	Telugu
1996	Ivala En Manaivi	Bhaskar	Doordarshan	Tamil
1996	Doctor Dharani		Doordarshan	Tamil
1996	Kaveri		Doordarshan	Tamil
1998–2000	Idhi Katha Kadu		ETV	Telugu
1998–1999	Velagu Needalu		ETV	Telugu
1999	Kasalavu Nesam		Sun TV / Raj TV	Tamil
2001–2002	Marumagal		Vijay TV	Tamil
2001–2003	Alaigal	Eswaramoorthy	Sun TV	Tamil
2002–2004	Ninne Pelladatha	Vittal Prasad	Gemini TV	Telugu
2005–2006	Deerga Sumangali		Sun TV	Tamil
2005	Aparajitha		Gemini TV	Telugu
2008	Emergency Action		Doordarshan	Tamil
2009–2010	Thendral	Velayudham	Sun TV	Tamil
2012–2014	Suryaputhri		Kalaignar TV	Tamil
2014–2017	Nambinaal Nambungal	Host	Zee Tamil	Tamil
2018–2020	Lahiri Lahiri Lahirilo	Devaraj	ETV	Telugu
2019–2020	Run	Dr. Radhakrishnan (RK)	Sun TV	Tamil
2020–2021	Chithi 2	Shanmugapriyan	Sun TV	Tamil
2020	The Forgotten Army - Azaadi Ke Liye	Maya's father	Amazon Prime Video	Hindi
2020	Breathe: Into the Shadows	Principal Krishnan Moorthy	Amazon Prime Video	Hindi
2021	Thirumagal	Shanmugapriyan (Special Appearance)	Sun TV	Tamil
2022	Irai	Subbaraj	Aha	Tamil
2022–2023	Vantalakka	Ramakotayya	Star Maa	Telugu
