= Kovil (film) =

- Poster
- Directed by: Hari
- Written by: Hari
- Produced by: A. M. Rathnam
- Starring: Silambarasan; Sonia Agarwal
- Cinematography: Priyan
- Edited by: V. T. Vijayan
- Music by: Harris Jayaraj
- Production company: Sri Suriya Movies
- Release date: 10 January 2004
- Running time: 148 minutes
- Country: India
- Language: Tamil

Kovil (transl. Temple) is a 2004 Indian Tamil-language romantic action drama film written and directed by Hari and produced by A. M. Rathnam. It stars Silambarasan and Sonia Agarwal while Vadivelu, Rajkiran, Charle and Nassar play supporting roles. The music was composed by Harris Jayaraj, with editing done by V. T. Vijayan and cinematography by Priyan. The film was released on 10 January 2004 and became a box-office hit.

== Plot ==
Puliyankulam and Veppankulam are adjacent villages with an enmity that has lasted for generations. Periyasamy is a Hindu from Puliyankulam and is widely respected by the villagers. Michael Soosai is a devout Christian from Veppankulam and does not trust followers of other religions. Sakthivel is Periyasamy's son, who studies in a college in Nagercoil. Angel is Michael's daughter, who also attends the same college. Sakthivel and Angel meet in college and fall in love. Angel is afraid that her father will never allow her to marry a Hindu, especially from the rival village. Michael and Periyasamy learn about the relationship between Sakthivel and Angel. Michael gets enraged and scolds his daughter, while Periyasamy agrees for the wedding. Michael does not want an inter-religion marriage and decides to force his daughter to become a nun. Periyasamy arrives and tells the truth in front of everyone that Angel Devi is Michael Susai's adopted daughter whose real name is Fathima Begum was born to Muslim parents Jaffer Hussain and Ayesha Beevi. Michael realises his mistake and agrees for the wedding.

== Cast ==
- Silambarasan as Shakthivel
- Sonia Agarwal as Fathima Begum / Angel Devi
- Vadivelu as 'Bullet' Pandi, Shakthivel's younger paternal uncle
- Rajkiran as Periyasamy
- Nassar as Michael Susai, Angel Devi's adoptive father
- Rekha as Mary, Angel Devi's adoptive mother
- Charle as Boothapandi
- Sathyan as Murugan, Shakthivel's friend
- Ganeshkar as Senthil, Shakthivel's friend
- Rajesh as Church Father Anthony James
- S. N. Lakshmi as Kamatchi, Shakthivel's grandmother
- Singamuthu as Astrologer Shanmugam
- Sathya Rangavasan as Sivagami, Shakthivel's mother
- Akash as Joseph, Angel Devi's adoptive cousin
- Bava Lakshmanan as Cycle Susai
- S. Ramana Girivasan as Namasivayam, Police Control Room Officer
- Paravai Muniyamma (special appearance in the song "Kadhal Panna")

== Production ==
Filming was held in locations including Tenkasi, Coutralam, Nagercoil and Munnar, and was completed within 59 days and two duet songs were shot at Thirunelveli.

== Soundtrack ==
The soundtrack was composed by Harris Jayaraj. All lyrics were written by Snehan, except for "Collegikku" (Na. Muthukumar).

Track listing
No.	Title	Lyrics	Singer(s)	Length
1.	"Arali Vidhaiyil"	Snehan	Palakkad Sreeram	3:06
2.	"Collegikku"	Na. Muthukumar	Karthik	5:16
3.	"Kadhal Panna"	Snehan	Kovai Kamala, Silambarasan, Vadivelu, Tippu	4:33
4.	"Kokku Meena"	Snehan	Shankar Mahadevan, Srilekha Parthasarathy	4:37
5.	"Puyalae Puyalae"	Snehan	Karthik, Mahathi	4:59
6.	"Silu Silu"	Snehan	Tippu	5:06
Total length:				27:37

Telugu track listing
No.	Title	Lyrics	Singer(s)	Length
1.	"Ravika Leni"	Sahithi	Ranjith, Sumangali	4:48
2.	"Kasi Kasiga" (Happy Version)	Sahithi	Harish Raghavendra	5:05
3.	"Poovamma"	Sahithi	Murali, Sumangali	5:00
4.	"Vishapu Vanilo"	Sahithi	Dr. Narayana	2:06
5.	"Gunde Ninda Dhairyam"	Ponduri	Murali, Malgudi Subha	4:33
6.	"Kasi Kasiga" (Sad Version)	Sahithi	Harish Raghavendra	5:04
7.	"Collegeki Podam"	Ponduri	Ranjith	5:20
Total length:				31:56

== Release and reception ==
Kovil was released on 10 January 2004. Malathi Rangarajan of The Hindu praised Silambarasan's performance as being "restrained and mature", but criticised the story for lack of originality. Sify reviewed the film more negatively, criticising its similarities to Alaigal Oivathillai (1981) and said, "Anyone who sees the film can find this out and is sure to compare it with the original". The reviewer appreciated Silambarasan because he was lacking "his usual mannerisms and style looks cool and is a relief to watch", although they criticised Aggarwal's performance and Harris Jayaraj's music. Visual Dasan of Kalki praised Hari for handling a controversial subject while also appreciating Priyan's cinematography and Harris Jayaraj's music. Malini Mannath wrote for Chennai Online, "The director's two earlier films Thamizh and Samy reveald him as a maker who thought differently. But this film is a routine, same romance, predictable and a little outdated". Cinesouth wrote "The screenplay fumbles like the lovers do when they arent able to make the right decision. Unfortunately, the solutions they think up only gets the screenplay into further troubles". Deccan Herald wrote "Hari beginning the movie with scene of religious misunderstanding between two sects of people arouses interest. But the screenplay is inconsistent and is predictable".
