= Arul (film) =

- Promotional poster
- Directed by: Hari
- Written by: Hari
- Produced by: T. Rama Rao (Presenter); T. Ajay Kumar
- Starring: Vikram; Jyothika
- Cinematography: Priyan
- Edited by: V. T. Vijayan
- Music by: Harris Jayaraj
- Production company: Lakshmi Productions
- Release date: 1 May 2004
- Running time: 163 minutes
- Country: India
- Language: Tamil

Arul (transl. Grace) (Note: Also the title character.) is a 2004 Indian Tamil-language action drama film written and directed by Hari. It stars Vikram and Jyothika, with Pasupathy, Kollam Thulasi and Vadivelu in supporting roles. The music was composed by Harris Jayaraj, while the cinematography and editing were handled by Priyan and V. T. Vijayan respectively. Arul was released on 1 May 2004 and ran for 75 days at the box office.

== Plot ==
Arul Kumaran, a factory worker separated from his family of goldsmiths in Coimbatore, gets into a verbal fight with the corrupt MLA Gajapathy, which results in Arul killing Gajapathy. Arul surrenders to the cops, but is later released from prison. Sethupathy, Gajapathy's elder brother and a political kingmaker, wants to exact revenge on Arul for Gajapathy's death. A cat and mouse game ensues in which Arul takes responsibility for cleaning anti-social elements and also becomes the kingmaker of Coimbatore.

== Cast ==
- Vikram as Arul Kumaran
- Jyothika as Kanmani
- Pasupathy as MLA Gajapathi
- Kollam Thulasi as Sethupathi, a Kingmaker criminal
- Vadivelu as Thangamani
- Sathyan as Senthil Kumaran, Arul's younger brother
- Vinu Chakravarthy as Bala Dhandayuthapani, Arul's father
- Sujatha as Sornam, Arul's mother
- Saranya Ponvannan as Bhagyam, Arul's elder sister
- Thalaivasal Vijay as Thiru Kumaran, Arul's elder brother
- K. S. Ravikumar as Thirupathi, Arul's elder brother-in-law
- Aarthi as Neelaveni, Kanmani's younger sister
- Vanitha Krishnachandran as Durga, Thiru Kumaran's wife
- Manobala as Paramasivam
- Ponnambalam as Paalayamkottai Kasilingam
- Kuyili as Kaveri, Kanmani & Neelaveni's mother
- Charan Raj as Inspector Ramanathan
- Rekha as Saroja, Gajapathi's wife
- Sarath Babu as Dr. Viswanathan
- Vaiyapuri as Raja
- Benjamin as Mani
- Siva Narayana Murthy as Shanmuga Pandi, a textile shop owner
- Thambi Ramaiah as Moorthi, Sethupathi's assistant
- Besant Ravi as Ravi, Sethupathi's assistant
- Minnal Deepa as Aarthi, Arul's second elder sister-in-law
- Priyanka as Veni
- Chaya Singh as Ponni (Special appearance in the song "Venam Ponni")
- Sampath Ram as Sundar (uncredited)
- Japan Kumar (uncredited appearance in "Ukkadathu Papadame")

== Production ==
After the success of Saamy, director Hari decided to again collaborate with actor Vikram for Arul. Jyothika was selected as heroine, pairing with Vikram again after Dhool. The filming began at AVM Studios on 19 December 2003 with a song sequence featuring Vikram and Jyothika. Vivek was originally a part of the cast but fell out with the director and was subsequently replaced by Vadivelu. Though the story is set in the backdrop of Coimbatore, the film was entirely shot at Karaikudi and was completed within 45 days.

== Soundtrack ==
The soundtrack was composed by Harris Jayaraj.

Track listing
No.	Title	Lyrics	Singer(s)	Length
1.	"Arul Theme" (Instrumental)	–	–	1:33
2.	"Ukkadathu Papadame"	Na. Muthukumar	Tippu, L. R. Eswari, Theni Kunjarammal	5:29
3.	"Oddiyaanam"	Vairamuthu	Hariharan, Srimathumitha	5:01
4.	"Patthu Viral"	Vairamuthu	S. P. Balasubrahmanyam, Swarnalatha	5:18
5.	"Punnakunnu"	Na. Muthukumar	Tippu, Sriram, Manikka Vinayagam	4:44
6.	"Soodamani"	Snehan	Ranjith, Pop Shalini	4:46
Total length:				26:51

== Critical reception ==
Malathi Rangarajan of The Hindu wrote, "In story and screenplay Hari could have done better. First of all a fearless, infallible hero pitted against a bunch of hoodlums and brutal, power-crazy politicians is too stereotypical for words. And when a completely unexpected twist occurs just before the break, the rest of the tale should be able to sustain the tempo created at the halfway point. Then, of course, you have the disjointed comic sequences". Sify wrote, "If you like Rambo style of films, Arul is worth investing". Malini Mannath of Chennai Online called it "a major let-down".

Mister Lee of Kalki felt Hari tried to rehash his previous films Thamizh and Saamy in a different matter and was critical of logical issues and panned the violence but appreciated Jyothika and Vadivelu's humour and Vikram's enthusiasm in fight sequences. Deccan Herald wrote, "The Saamy team of director Hari, Vikram and Harris Jayaraj is back with Arul, which is an out and out mass entertainer. Vikram's most awaited movie doesn't disappoint the audience and Arul has everything to give you your money's worth".
