= Hari (director) =

Indian film director and screenwriter

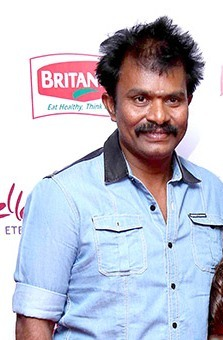
- Hari at the 62nd Filmfare South Awards
- Born: Hari Krishnan; 26 December 1973 (age 52); Katchanavilai Village, Thoothukudi District, Tamil Nadu, India
- Occupation: Film director Screenwriter
- Years active: 2002–present
- Spouse: Pritha Hari
- Children: 3
- Family: Vijayakumar family (by marriage)

Harikrishnan is an Indian film director and screenwriter who works in Tamil cinema. He is known for directing action and masala films. Hari made his directorial debut with Thamizh (2002) and went on to direct films such as Saamy (2003), Kovil (2004), Ayya (2005), Thaamirabharani (2007), Vel (2007), and the Singam film series (2010-2017). He mostly directs Coimbatore, Dindigul, Tenkasi and Thoothukudi-Tirunelveli district based movies.

== Early life ==
Hari was born on 26 December 1973 in the Thoothukudi district in Tamil Nadu, India. His father, Gopalakrishnan, runs a grocery store. Later, his family moved to Chennai, where Hari graduated with a degree in commerce.

== Career ==
Hari first joined as an assistant, gaining experience by working with various directors, including Senthilnathan, Jeevabalan, Ameerjan, K. Natraj in Valli, Alex Pandian, and Nassar in Avatharam. Later, he assisted K. Balachander in his film Kalki and worked as an associate director with Saran in the films Amarkkalam, Parthen Rasithen and Alli Arjuna.

Hari's first film, in 2002, was Thamizh, with Prashanth and Simran. Film critic Balaji commented that it was "one of the few movies in recent times where a lot of importance seems to have been attached to the script. In spite of the flimsy story and routine screenplay where a youth grows to be a "dada", the dialogs elevate the quality of the movie and make it very enjoyable". His second film, Saamy, under the Kavithaalaya banner, starred Vikram. It was named the year's biggest hit, grossing ₹160 million. Its success led to remakes in Telugu (Lakshmi Narasimha), Kannada (Ayya) and Hindi (Policegiri). His next two were films Kovil, with Silambarasan and Arul with Vikram. In 2005, he made Ayya, starring Sarathkumar, which introduced Nayantara to Tamil cinema. His next film was Aaru, with Suriya in 2005. In 2007, he directed two films, Thaamirabharani with Vishal and Vel, with Suriya. In 2008, he directed Seval, with Bharath. Ayyappa Prasad from Nowrunning.com stated that Hari "panders to the taste of his rural audience all the way, but the movie is bound to disappoint city-dwellers, since neither the story nor its treatment appeal to anyone with high IQ."

In 2010 Hari directed his tenth film Singam, with Suriya, marking their third collaboration. The film was one of the top box office films of the year, although reviewers identified it as a standard masala entertainer. Following its success, the film was remade in Hindi (Singham), Kannada (Kempe Gowda) and Bengali (Shotru). After directing Venghai, a film with Dhanush and Tamannaah Bhatia in the lead, he made a sequel to Singam, with Suriya reprising his role as Duraisingam. It was named one of the biggest box office hits of 2013, with Sify stating that it was "the biggest theatrical earner" of the year. He worked for the second time with Vishal, in a film titled Poojai, which had Shruti Haasan as the female lead. Hari joined with Suriya for the fifth time for Singam 3 (2017). In 2018, he directed Saamy Square, the sequel of Saamy starring Vikram in the lead role. The film marks the third collaboration between Hari and Vikram. The film has met with mixed response.

Hari started working with actor and also his brother-in-law, Arun Vijay, in their first collaboration, Yaanai, which was released in 2022. In 2024, he joined with Vishal in their third collaboration with Rathnam (2024), which received mixed reviews from movie critics.

After Saamy Square, Hari will most likely team up with Suriya yet again. Earlier, director Hari revealed that his next project with Suriya would not be Singam 4, but a fresh script. In an interview with an entertainment portal, Hari has disclosed details about this untitled film. In February 2020, Studio Green officially announced that Hari's next movie with Surya would be titled "Aruvaa" and would be released in Diwali 2020, but now Suriya has proceeded with his other projects, and it is uncertain whether Aruvaa will happen or not.

== Personal life ==
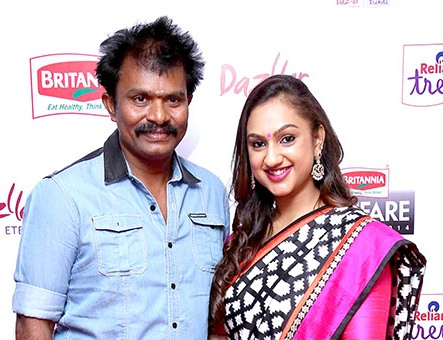
Hari with his wife Preetha Vijayakumar.

Hari is married to former actress Preetha Vijayakumar, the daughter of Vijayakumar and Manjula, half-sister of actor Arun Vijay, and has three sons.

== Filmmaking style ==
Hari's films are usually fast-paced and are primarily in the action and masala genres. Due to his preference for such films, Hari has been nicknamed the "Aruva director" as the aruva (sickle) is present in most of his films. Hari's films often include recurring elements such as ferocious protagonists, humorous subplots, and item numbers.

== Filmography ==
=== As writer and director ===
Year	Film	Notes
2002	Thamizh	Directorial Debut
2003	Saamy	
2004	Kovil	
2004	Arul	
2005	Ayya	
2005	Aaru	
2007	Thaamirabharani	
2007	Vel	
2008	Seval	
2010	Singam	
2011	Venghai	
2013	Singam II	
2014	Poojai	
2017	Si3	
2018	Saamy Square	
2022	Yaanai	
2024	Rathnam	

=== As lyricist ===
Year	Film	Song	Composer
2007	Thaamirabharani	Thaaliye Thevaiyillai	Yuvan Shankar Raja
2007	Vel	Thoppul Kodi and Otraikannale	Yuvan Shankar Raja
2008	Seval	"Thayaramma" and "Thulasi Chediya"	G. V. Prakash Kumar
2011	Venghai	Yenna Solla Pore and Pudikkudhu.	Devi Sri Prasad
2017	Si3	Vettai Theme and Wi Wi Wi Wi Wifi	Harris Jayaraj
2022	Yaanai	Ganapathy Saranam, Deiva Magale and Edhanaala Varutham	G. V. Prakash Kumar

=== Frequent collaborators ===
Collaborator	Thamizh; (2002)	Saamy; (2003)	Kovil; (2004)	Arul; (2004)	Ayya; (2005)	Aaru; (2005)	Thaamirabharani; (2007)	Vel; (2007)	Seval; (2008)	Singam; (2010)	Venghai; (2011)	Singam II; (2013)	Poojai; (2014)	Singam III; (2017)	Saamy Square; (2018)	Yaanai; (2022)	Rathnam; (2024)
Suriya						Yes		Yes		Yes		Yes		Yes			
Vadivelu	Yes		Yes	Yes	Yes	Yes		Yes	Yes								
Vijayakumar		Yes					Yes			Yes		Yes		Yes	Yes (archival footage)		Yes
Nassar	Yes		Yes				Yes	Yes		Yes		Yes		Yes			
Delhi Ganesh	Yes	Yes				Yes									Yes		Yes
Manorama	Yes	Yes					Yes			Yes		Yes		Yes			
Nizhalgal Ravi					Yes	Yes	Yes			Yes	Yes	Yes					
Aishwariyaa Bhaskaran						Yes		Yes					Yes		Yes	Yes	
Thalaivasal Vijay	Yes			Yes								Yes	Yes			Yes	
O. A. K. Sundar					Yes			Yes			Yes		Yes		Yes	Yes	
Charle	Yes		Yes		Yes			Yes			Yes						
Singamuthu		Yes	Yes			Yes		Yes	Yes						Yes		
Madhan Bob					Yes	Yes		Yes	Yes			Yes					
Imman Annachi								Yes					Yes	Yes	Yes	Yes	
Chaams						Yes	Yes	Yes						Yes	Yes		
Yuvan Shankar Raja							Yes	Yes					Yes				
Crane Manohar		Yes			Yes	Yes	Yes	Yes		Yes		Yes		Yes	Yes		
Devi Sri Prasad						Yes				Yes	Yes	Yes			Yes		Yes
Priyan	Yes	Yes	Yes	Yes	Yes	Yes	Yes	Yes	Yes	Yes		Yes	Yes	Yes			
V. T. Vijayan	Yes	Yes	Yes	Yes	Yes	Yes	Yes	Yes	Yes	Yes	Yes	Yes	Yes	Yes	Yes		
