= Raajjiyam =

- DVD cover
- Directed by: Manoj Kumar
- Written by: V. Prabhakar (dialogues)
- Screenplay by: Manoj Kumar
- Story by: R. Meghanathan
- Produced by: Manoj Kumar
- Starring: Vijayakanth; Dileep; Shamita Shetty; Priyanka Trivedi
- Cinematography: A. Kaarthik Raja
- Edited by: P. Mohanraj
- Music by: Bharadwaj
- Production company: Guru Films
- Release date: 14 April 2002
- Country: India
- Language: Tamil
- Budget: ₹7 crore

Raajjiyam (transl. Kingdom) is a 2002 Indian Tamil-language political action film directed and produced by Manoj Kumar. The film stars Vijayakanth, Dileep, Shamita Shetty and Priyanka Trivedi. The music was composed by Bharadwaj. The film was released on 14 April 2002, and it became a commercial failure. The film marked the debut of actors Dileep, Shamita and Priyanka in Tamil cinema. The film was remade into Bengali Bangladesh in 2002 as Bhaiya starring Manna, Rachna Banerjee and Shabnur.

== Plot ==
Karthikeyan runs a Central Government-authorized Secret Service agency called "Jothi Security Force" under the guise of an organization that helps people arriving in Chennai. He leads a happy life with his wife Geetha, daughter Pooja, and younger brother Surya, a mute. Surya falls in love with Anuradha, a woman that Karthikeyan brings home from the railway station, but her past forces her to reject his romance. When the governor's daughter-in-law dies, Karthikeyan finds out that it was a murder and arrests the governor's son Kiran Kumar. Though the governor congratulates Karthikeyan and appoints him as his personal bodyguard, he is plotting his revenge on him. The innocent Surya is then arrested during a riot. In jail, Inspector Kabilan, who hates Karthikeyan after being humiliated by him and works for the governor, tortures Surya. Kabilan later swaps Kiran Kumar and Surya: Surya gets hooked in jail and Kiran Kumar is secretly released from jail. Karthikeyan eventually discovers the plot and takes revenge by killing Kabilan and the governor.

== Cast ==
- Vijayakanth as Karthikeyan
- Dileep as Surya
- Shamita Shetty as Geetha Karthikeyan
- Priyanka Trivedi as Anuradha
- Vadivelu as Sengalvarayan (Sengal)
- Murali as Ashok Sharma, Governor
- Anand as Kiran Kumar, Governor's son
- Ponnambalam as Ponnambalam
- Janakaraj as Governor's PA
- Senthil
- Mansoor Ali Khan as Inspector Kabilan
- Baby Akshaya as Pooja
- Rocky as Terrorist
- Singamuthu as Convict
- Pandu as Security Officer
- Mohan Sharma as Deputy Commissioner of Police
- Lavanya as Janaki
- Usharani as Janaki's mother
- Peeli Sivam as Anuradha's father
- Vijay Easwaran as Easwar
- Kallukkul Eeram Ramanathan as Ramanathan
- Kalidoss as Jayapal
- Lekhasri as Sneha, Sengalvarayan's lover
- Besant Ravi as Henchman
- Kottai Perumal as Man at the railway station
- Manivannan in a special appearance
- Vijayakumar

== Production ==
The fight scene between Vijayakanth and Ponnamabalam was taken on a revolving bamboo, with the two men standing on either edge, the scene choreographed by Super Subbarayan. For the set, 20 lorries carrying bamboos were brought in, and set designer Shanmugham arranged them in order to make the place look like a bamboo fortress. It took twelve days to shoot the scene, and canning the shots was Kartikraja. The film was produced at a cost of ₹7 crore. The song "Thamizhan Thamizhan" was shot in Kanyakumari, Tirunelveli, Madurai, Tiruchi, Salem, Coimbatore and Chennai.

== Soundtrack ==
The music was composed by Bharadwaj, and lyrics were written by Snehan. The song "Oru Aayiram Suriyan" is based on Bharadwaj's own Telugu song "Oh Manasa Thondhara" from Telugu film Oka Chinna Maata.

Song	Singers
"Naan Unna Ninaichen"	S. P. Balasubrahmanyam, Pop Shalini
"Thamizhan Thamizhan"	Krishnaraj, S. P. Balasubrahmanyam
"Ore Oru Punnagai "	P. Unnikrishnan, Sujatha
"Oru Aayiram Suriya"	Reshmi, Bharadwaj
"Namma Ooru Chennaiyile"	Sabesh
"Annan Thambi"	Bharadwaj
"Uyir Theduthe"	Bharadwaj
"Kangalai Pole"	Bharadwaj

== Release and reception ==
The film was released on 12 April 2002 alongside Thamizhan, Thamizh and Gemini. Pearl of Rediff.com wrote, "Though the film created expectations as a political thriller with Vijaykanth spewing dialogues laden with political nuances, Raajjiyam is about brothers, laced with action sequences". Malathi Rangarajan of The Hindu wrote, "Guru Films' 'Rajjiyam' has characters that lack depth and situations that lack verve. Manoj Kumar's screenplay and direction leave much to be desired." Cinesouth wrote, "Manojkumar should have worked harder with the screenplay. Politically influenced dialogues and fight sequences don't alone satisfy a viewer. Its a shock that he doesn't know this". Malini Mannath of Chennai Online wrote, "Vijaykant fights with gusto, though the camera inadvertently catching the rope tied to the back of the hero, destroys the illusion, as he does his gravity-defying leaps and kicks-in-the-air act. This is just one of the instances of the lack of seriousness in scripting and narration and the slips and loopholes that abound in the film". Sify wrote "All said and endured Rajiyam is one of the worst films of Vijaykanth. Malayalam actors Dileep and Murali are wasted. Vijaykanth tries desperately to hog the show but fails, as he looks jaded. Less said about the Mumbai imports like Shamita Shetty and Priyanka Trivedi the better. Technically the film is tacky and the music by Bharadwaj is a let down".
