= Ayya (2005 Tamil film) =

Tamil film directed by Hari

- Poster
- Directed by: Hari
- Written by: Hari
- Produced by: K. Balachander (Presenter); Pushpa Kandasamy
- Starring: R. Sarathkumar; Nayanthara; Napoleon; Prakash Raj
- Cinematography: Priyan
- Edited by: V. T. Vijayan
- Music by: Bharadwaj
- Production company: Kavithalayaa Productions
- Release date: 14 January 2005
- Running time: 159 minutes
- Country: India
- Language: Tamil

Ayya (transl. Sir) is a 2005 Indian Tamil-language action drama film written and directed by Hari, and produced by Kavithalayaa Productions. The film stars R. Sarathkumar in a dual role with Nayanthara (in her Tamil debut), Napoleon, and Prakash Raj. The music was composed by Bharadwaj with editing by V. T. Vijayan and cinematography by Priyan. Ayya released on 14 January 2005 coinciding Pongal and became a commercial success.

== Plot ==
The movie starts during the times of the Indo-Pakistani war of 1971, where there is a heavy drought in the southern districts of Tamil Nadu. Ayyadurai and Madasamy are close friends and landlords of different castes presumably from the Mukkulathor and Nadar communities respectively in Tenkasi town in Tirunelveli district, and they try hard to help people and save them from dying during the drought.

The Tenkasi MLA Shanmugapandi, also a relative of Madasamy, smuggles rice given by the Government of Tamil Nadu, and people protest upon knowing this. Shanmugapandi denies knowing anything about the sanctioned rice. That night, he starts to smuggle the rice via Karaiyar instead of the usual route via Sengottai, but the lorries are waylaid and ransacked by the people led by Madasamy. Shanmugapandi comes there and starts shooting towards people. Ayyadurai sees Shanmugapandi aiming for Madasamy and pushes him. Then, Ayyadurai beats Shanmugapandi using the hilt of the gun, following which the latter dies. The local people support Ayyadurai, save him from police, and also urge him to contest in the Tamil Nadu Legislative Assembly by-elections.

The film comes to the present, where Ayyadurai has been the unopposed MLA of Tenkasi for more than 35 years. He returns from Chennai after resigning his post because the state department did not sanction his request to renovate the lakes in his constituency. He is welcomed by the people along with his son Chelladurai and friend Madasamy in Tenkasi Junction railway station. Chelladurai, a civil engineer, runs their business and helps his father for the people's welfare. Selvi is Madasamy's teenage daughter who deliberately fails her 12th standard exam as she loves Chelladurai and wants to marry him.

Meanwhile, Karuppusamy is the son of Shanmugapandi and wants to take revenge by either defeating or killing Ayyadurai. He has contested thrice against Ayyadurai in the past decade, with no avail. He has also made around 20 attempts on Ayyadurai's life without any success. Meanwhile, Selvi proposes her love to Chelladurai, but he does not accept, saying that it might result in clashes between their families as they both belong to different castes. Also, there comes a flashback where it is shown that a few years back, Chelladurai's arranged marriage got cancelled the night before the wedding as the bride Thulasi had eloped with her lover, which makes Chelladurai feel embarrassed. Because of this, he prefers to stay unmarried.

Selvi, after failing her exams, informs about her love to both families, and after much deliberation due to varying castes, they decide to get them married. Now, Karuppusamy (being a second cousin of Madasamy) plays tricks to separate both Ayyadurai and Madasamy. He sends police on the day of the marriage, saying that Selvi is still a minor and that it is illegal to get her married before 18 years of age. Ayyadurai accepts this and informs Madasamy to postpone the wedding. This angers Madasamy, who believes that the police were sent only by Ayyadurai to cancel the marriage as both of them belonged to different castes. The policeman also confirms Madasamy's suspicion, and the four-generation friendship is broken off . Karuppusamy uses this opportunity to get close to Madasamy and makes him the witness for Shanmugapandi's murder by Ayyadurai. The police arrests Ayyadurai.

The general election dates are announced in the state. The ruling party again gives a chance for Karuppusamy to contest, giving him an ultimatum to win. Ayyadurai cannot contest due to the murder case, and hence, he nominates an unwilling Chelladurai in his stead. Karuppusamy, in order to get both caste votes and win the election, plans to murder Madasamy and blame Chelladurai. However, before this, Chelladurai saves Madasamy, though he later gives his signed withdrawal form to Karuppusamy and says that he let him become the unopposed MLA as he is also a good-natured man, and his anger is only on Ayyadurai and not on the people of the town. Karuppusamy realises his mistake and apologises to Ayyadurai and Chelladurai for all his criminal activities. However, Ayyadurai prefers to stay in prison as he still feels guilty for murdering Shanmugapandi years ago. Karuppusamy becomes the MLA, and Chelladurai and Selvi marry to unify the families.

== Cast ==
- R. Sarathkumar as Ayyadurai and Chelladurai ( dual role)
- Napoleon as Madasamy
- Nayanthara as Selvi (Voice dubbed by Mahalakshmi Kannan)
- Prakash Raj as Karuppusamy
- Vadivelu as Karasingam A.C.
- Lakshmi as Kalyani
- Rohini as Meenatchi
- Charle as Muthuvel
- Malavika as Thulasi
- O. A. K. Sundar as MLA Shanmugapandi
- Sindhu as Kasthuri
- Madhan Bob as Kesavan
- G. Srinivasan as Rangasamy
- Nizhalgal Ravi as Ramadurai
- Raj Kapoor as Inspector Sivaraman
- Gandhimathi as Kamatchi
- Kavithalaya Krishnan as Manikkam
- Periyar Dasan as Lingam
- John Amirtharaj as Thangavelu
- Bava Lakshmanan as Murugan
- Crane Manohar as Senthil
- Bonda Mani as Mani
- Halwa Vasu as Sevalai
- Benjamin as Sudalai
- Thennavan as Kathavarayan
- Siva Narayana Murthy
- Bayilvan Ranganathan

== Production ==
The film's subject was first narrated to Rajinikanth. However R. Sarathkumar clarified that the film was first offered to him which he was not able to do due to busy schedule, then it was narrated to Rajinikanth which did not work out then later it again came back to him. Navya Nair was initially cast in the film, before being replaced by Nayanthara, marking her Tamil film debut. The filming was held at Tirunelveli, Tenkasi, Courtallam, Thoothukudi and Tiruchendur and at Karnataka. A fight sequence where some men block the title character's car and fight following it was shot at Kallidaikurichi, near Tirunelveli.

== Soundtrack ==
The songs and background score were composed by Bharadwaj.

Track listing
No.	Title	Lyrics	Singer(s)	Length
1.	"Aththiri Baththiri"		Janani Bharadwaj
2.	"Ayyathorai"	Na. Muthukumar	P.Balaram, Ragavendar
3.	"Oru Vaartha Kekka"	Pa. Vijay	KK, Sadhana Sargam
4.	"Suththipoda Venaama"	Pa. Vijay	Tippu, Srimathumitha
5.	"Thamirabarani Raani"	Pa. Vijay	KK, Shreya Ghoshal
6.	"Thenam Ayyaanu"	Na. Muthukumar	VNB
7.	"Ayyaathorai" (bit)	Na. Muthukumar	Bharadwaj

== Release ==
Ayyaa was released on 14 January 2005 on Pongal festival alongside films like Thirupaachi, Aayudham and Devathaiyai Kanden. The film's theatrical and satellite rights were sold to Ravichandran's Oscar Films for ₹7.25 crore at a table profit of ₹2.25 crore.

== Critical reception ==
Malini Mannath of Chennai Online wrote "'Ayya' is an emotion-packed family drama worth watching." Visual Dasan of Kalki wrote even within the commercial formula, Ayya makes the mind heavy with high ambitions. Cinesouth wrote "After the debacle of his previous films, Kovil and Arul had made the director Hari to stand tall with pride. There are directors who would make a good screenplay out of good story and make successful movie, and there are directors who would make good screenplay from not so good story and yet make successful movies. But the director Hari had taken up a good story and also made effective screenplay out of it. He should be appreciated very much for this".

Sify wrote "Though Hari tends to be preachy at times, he has packaged the film with essential commercial ingredients like Vadivel’s comedy track where the plight of a running a C-class theatre owner is brought out effectively. Added to that, the romantic bits between a minor girl and a man in his early 30’s are brought out well. Another highlight is the bonding between the father and son is told in a subtle manner". G. Ulaganathan of Deccan Herald wrote, "Director Hari is one of the young directors of Tamil cinema with great promise and in this film, he avoids unnecessary songs, vulgarity and dramatics. Instead, he concentrates on a neat screenplay and a script which extracts good performances from his artistes".
