= Lakshmi Narasimha (film) =

- Movie Poster
- Directed by: Jayanth C. Paranjee
- Written by: Paruchuri Brothers (dialogues)
- Screenplay by: Jayanth C. Paranjee
- Story by: Hari
- Based on: Saamy (Tamil)
- Produced by: Bellamkonda Suresh
- Starring: Nandamuri Balakrishna; Asin; Prakash Raj
- Cinematography: K. Prasad
- Edited by: Marthand K. Venkatesh
- Music by: Mani Sharma
- Production company: Sri Sai Ganesh Productions
- Release date: 14 January 2004
- Running time: 185 minutes
- Country: India
- Language: Telugu
- Budget: ₹10 Crore
- Box office: ₹16 crore distributors' share

Lakshmi Narasimha is a 2004 Indian Telugu-language action film produced by Bellamkonda Suresh on Sri Sai Ganesh Productions banner and directed by Jayanth C. Paranjee. Starring Nandamuri Balakrishna, Asin and Prakash Raj, Rao Ramesh, with music composed by Mani Sharma. The film was released on January 14, 2004, to positive reviews and was declared a hit. The film is a remake of the 2003, Tamil Movie Saamy. The film was later dubbed into Hindi as IPS Narasimha in 2010 by Aditya Music. Despite having an original Tamil version, the film was dubbed into the same language as Latchmi Narasimman in 2021. The film was also re-released in 4K on June 8, 2025.

== Plot ==
The film begins in Vijayawada, a city plagued by the rule of the demonic leader Dharmabhiksham, who has brought crime and corruption to the region. DCP Lakshmi Narasimha Swamy, a stout-hearted cop, lands in the city and makes rules of his own. He commands the sub-ordinates to do whatever they wish, stipulating no harm to the public, ruthlessly forsakes anyone, and arrests the thugs. In his administration, law & order are in shape, and people are safe & sound. Following this, Dharmabhiksham invites and warns him about his transfer because he forbears the bribe. Surprisingly, Swamy agrees to do so, by the terms & conditions Dharmabhiksham accepts.

Once, Swamy is acquainted with a pure college-going girl, Rukmini, who is searching for a home. Rukmini misconstrues him as a thief but ensues the reality and regrets. After a series of frequent rendezvous, they turn to love. In the interim, at Dharmabhiksham's gas station, his goons assault the citizens for questioning that they are pouring less petrol. So, Swamy raids and seals it when Dharmabhiksham mortifies him as his suborner. Listening to it, Rukmini loathes him as she averses corruption when he divulges his past.

After completing his IPS, Swamy takes charge and apprehends honorable-seeking criminals led by Dharmabhiksham. Hence, he launches onslaughts that cost Swamy's sister and many natives of his village. It leads to Swamy's dismissal with false allegations, but his father regains his post with hush money and asks him to be on duty to rehabilitate ruined villagers. That's why he is taking bribes, of which Dharmabhiksham is unaware. Then, Rukmini comprehends his virtue, and the elders fix their alliance.

Meanwhile, on the eve of the festival, the ruling party calls for a strike when the retail vendors plead with Swamy to provide security. He holds the responsibility and hinders the shuts of Dharmabhiksham, which calls off the protest—subsequently, enraged Dharmabhiksham, waiting for a shot, cabals while wedlock of Swamy and detonates the market. Being conscious of the brutality, Swamy counterattacks, so he receives transfers and must be relieved with 1-week from the city. Here, Swamy challenges Dharmabhiksham, saying it's sufficient to collapse his dynasty. Moreover, he triumphs in it with his several enforcement tactics.

As of today, Dharmabhiksham ruses by planting a bomb at Swamy's residence. Knowing it, Swamy sends Rukmini to his hometown, but unfortunately, his father swaps and dies in the blast. Now incensed, Swamy accumulates all the evidence against Dharmabhiksham and takes an arrest warrant against him. Despite the hindering of the authorities & ministers, he moves to seize him. After a vast hunt, Swamy catches hold of Dharmabhiksham when he prepares to surrender and scoffs at him. At last, Swamy encounters him and secretly burns his corpse, leaving him as a missing case for absconding riots, revenge, & public harm. Finally, the movie ends with Lakshmi Narasimha Swamy proceeding further constraint to his duty.

== Cast ==
- Nandamuri Balakrishna as DCP Lakshmi Narasimha Swamy
- Asin as Rukhmini, Lakshmi Narasimha’s Wife (Voice Dubbed by Sunitha)
- Prakash Raj as Dharma Rao Alias Dharma Bhiksham
- K. Viswanath as Ramachandraiah, Lakshmi Narasimha's father
- Nadhiya as Prabhavati, Lakshmi Narasimha's mother
- Suhasini Maniratnam as Snehalatha, Lakshmi Narasimha and Rukmini's mother
- Sayaji Shinde as Bokha Sivaram, Lakshmi Narasimha and Rukmini’s father
- Brahmanandam as Ramakrishna, Lakshmi Narasimha's friend
- Sunil as Raj, Lakshmi Narasimha’s friend
- Rao Ramesh as Sisupala, Lakshmi Narasimha’s brother in law
- Krishna Bhagavan as Akuvakkala Ananda Rao
- Murali Mohan as Bhavani Prasad, Rukmini’s son in law
- Duvvasi Mohan as Duvvasi
- Ahuti Prasad as Police Commissioner
- Narra Venkateswara Rao as Venkayya
- Paruchuri Venkateswara Rao as Venkatachalam, Rukhmini's father
- Chandra Mohan as Chandram
- Mallikarjuna Rao as Ram Murthy
- Mukesh Rishi as Dhanraj, Lakshmi Narasimha's friend father
- Geetha as Janaki, Lakshmi Narasimha's friend mother
- Raghu Babu as Raghu, Dharma Biksham's henchmen
- Gundu Sudarshan as Gundu
- Sudha as Amrutham, Rukhmini's mother
- M. S. Narayana as Narayana, Raj's friend
- Chittajalu Lakshmipati as Lakshmipati, Dharma Biksham's brother-in-law
- L. B. Sriram as Sriram, Raj's friend
- Fish Venkat as Dharma, Bhiksham's henchman
- Vallabhaneni Janardhan
- Thotapalli Madhu
- Prasanna Kumar
- Naveen
- Prabhu
- Ratna Sagar
- Ashalata
- Lata Chowdary
- Vimala Sri
- Karate Kalyani as a prostitute
- Rakshitha as an item number

== Soundtrack ==
Lakshmi Narasimha

Film score by Mani Sharma
- Released: 25 December 2003
- Genre: Soundtrack
- Length: 32:32
- Label: Supreme Music
- Producer: Mani Sharma

Mani Sharma chronology
Abhimanyu (2003)	Lakshmi Narasimha (2003)	Anji (2004)

The music was composed by Mani Sharma, and was released on 25 December 2003 by Supreme Music Company. "Devunne Pilichavante" is based on "Old Model Laila" from the Tamil film Youth.

No.	Title	Lyrics	Singer(s)	Length
1.	"Devunne Pilichavante"	Chandrabose	Shankar Mahadevan	5:43
2.	"Andamlo Andhrakosta"	Veturi	S. P. Balasubrahmanyam, Shreya Ghoshal	5:32
3.	"Jadathoti Kodithe"	Chandrabose	S. P. Balasubrahmanyam, Sujatha	5:44
4.	"Marumalli Jabilli"	Chandrabose	Shankar Mahadevan, Sravana Bhargavi, Muralidhar	5:24
5.	"Pappesuko Charesuko"	Chandrabose	Mallikarjun, Mahalakshmi Iyer	4:23
6.	"Naathoti Neeku Panundi"	Chandrabose	Karthik, Mahalakshmi Iyer	5:44
Total length:				32:32

== Reception ==
Local review site Idlebrain rated the film three and a half stars and noted, "First half of the film is entertaining. Second half is OK. The interval bang is smooth. The flashback episode should have had more punch. The second half is heavily loaded with mass elements. The duration of film should be trimmed by a good 30 minutes to make the film more crisp. Bala Krishna's terrific performance is going to be the biggest strength of the film." Sify movies stated "Lakshmi Narasimha, the police story is being appreciated for its story, presentation and heroism of Balakrishna, the hero. It has taken a fantastic opening all over and is expected to be a long distance winner". Harikrishna of Telugu cinema wrote "The movie is worth watching for Balakrishna’s extraordinary performance and Jayanth’s direction".

== Controversy ==
Balakrishna was involved in a shooting incident on 3 June 2004, around 20:50, at his residence in Jubilee Hills, Hyderabad. The actor fired shots at producer Bellamkonda Suresh and his associate, Satyanarayana Chowdhary. Later, both of them were admitted at Apollo Hospital. The circumstances under which the case was handled led to much controversy as purported by the Human Right Forum (HRF). The HRF has questioned the authenticity of the people who handled the case, and the circumstances under which the actor was shielded from police by giving refuge in the CARE Hospital without any justifiable cause.

The two victims have given statements before the magistrate alleging that the actor has fired shots at them during their treatment in the hospital, but soon they were retracted and made volte-face of their earlier statements. The actor was arrested later on 6 June at around 3:30 AM and produced before the Fifth Metropolitan Magistrate. A show cause notice was also served on Balakrishna's wife, Vasundhara Devi, as the weapon used was licensed under her name, and she could not give sufficient protection to her licensed weapon. But later, the actor was granted bail.
