= Bala (2002 film) =

- DVD cover
- Directed by: Deepak
- Written by: Deepak; Viji (dialogues)
- Produced by: Rajaa Baalu; Raju Magalingam
- Starring: Shaam; Meera Jasmine
- Cinematography: Priyan
- Edited by: V. T. Vijayan
- Music by: Yuvan Shankar Raja
- Production company: Goldmine Pictures
- Release date: 13 December 2002
- Country: India
- Language: Tamil

Bala is a 2002 Indian Tamil-language gangster action film written and directed by Deepak, starring Shaam as the titular character in the lead role, while Meera Jasmine, Raghuvaran, Rajan P. Dev, Thilakan, Nagesh, and Karunas play supporting roles. The music was composed by Yuvan Shankar Raja with cinematography by Priyan and editing by V. T. Vijayan. The film was released on 13 December 2002.

== Plot ==
Bala is the favourite hitman of gangster Pasupathi. When Bala is not zooming around in jeeps with a wild-looking gang, parading down lanes with the same gang faithfully following a step behind him, or knocking down one person or another, he is successfully wooing Aarthi, the girl he fell for at first sight. Aarthi is the daughter of Jayamani, a rival gangster. Ailing don Paranthaman, the mentor of the two rivals, seeing his protégés at each other's throats, brings a compromise by suggesting that Aarthi will be married to Pasupathi's wayward son. Bala naturally becomes a unwanted person in both camps, till it's all's well that ends well.

== Cast ==
- Shaam as Bala
- Meera Jasmine as Aarthi
- Raghuvaran as Jayamani
- Rajan P. Dev as Pasupathi
- Thilakan as Paranthaman
- Nagesh as Varadhan
- Karunas as Kutty
- Thalaivasal Vijay as Om Prakash
- Rajasekar as Vishwanath
- Kalairani as Bala's blind mother
- Meera Krishnan as Abirami
- Santhoshi as Purnima
- Mahanadhi Shankar as Madhurai
- Singamuthu as Venkatarama
- Sabitha Anand as Bhagyam
- Gouthami as Pasupathi's wife
- Kamalesh as Guru
- Master Udayaraj as Jayamani's son
- Baby Srividya as Jayamani's daughter
- Scissor Manohar as the bus conductor
- Muthukaalai as a bus passenger

== Production ==
Deepak, who worked as an assistant director to Gandhi Krishna (of Engineer) and as an editor made his directorial debut with this film. Yuvan Shankar Raja was signed to compose the music for the film. Vidya Balan, the original choice for lead actress, was replaced by Meera Jasmine in the film. Shaam departed from his romantic hero role and portrayed an action oriented role in the film.

Some scenes were shot on a boat about fifteen kilometers from the harbour, in Chennai whereas at the Vauhini Studios, Chennai, a lavish set was erected where Shaam and Meera Jasmine danced to the beat of a song.

== Soundtrack ==
The soundtrack, featuring 5 songs, was composed by Yuvan Shankar Raja and released on 20 October 2002. The song "Bailamo Bailamo" was originally composed for the Srikanth-starrer April Maadhathil, but eventually used in this film. The song "Theendi Theendi" is based on "Rim Jhim Rim Jhim" from Mahaadev (1989), which was composed by Ilaiyaraaja, Yuvan's father.

Track listing
No.	Title	Lyrics	Singer(s)	Length
1.	"Bailamo Bailamo"	Pa. Vijay	Yuvan Shankar Raja	4:20
2.	"Poopoovai"	Pa. Vijay	Unni Menon, Ganga	4:55
3.	"Theendi Theendi"	Arivumathi	P. Unnikrishnan, Sujatha Mohan	4:10
4.	"Vaanathu Poochi"	Kabilan	Karthik, Mathangi	4:30
5.	"En Kannai"	Palani Bharathi	Shankar Mahadevan	4:13
Total length:				22:08

== Release and reception ==
A critic from The Hindu stated that "'Bala' is another of those typical action flicks that flood the cinema scene today". Malini Mannath of Chennai Online opined that "It's yet again a gangster film, the scenes flowing albeit smoothly, but expectantly through clichéd situations giving one a sense of deja vu throughout". Visual Dasan of Kalki criticised the age old story and called the film boring, however he praised the dialogues, background score, and cinematography. Sify wrote "There is nothing new in the story as it looks like a rehash of several films. The flashback of how Bala became a hatchet man for Pasupathi is long winded and tame. Even the music of Yuvan Shankar Raja fails to impress. Shaam looks totally uncomfortable and he needs to put in more effort in emotional scenes. Meera Jasmine has the screen presence though she has nothing much to do. On the whole the film fails to impress as director Deepak could not package the film as an entertainer". Cinesouth wrote "The film was a lifeline for Shyam who had been having only failures and for debut director Deepak. Sorry to say this, but a wishy-washy plot and weak narration made the film a disaster". Deccan Herald wrote "The film is more about action, good songs, nice cinematography but fails when it comes to script. Director Deepak, who has penned the story and dialogues for the movie, had tried something new in seeking to portray the good side of the negative characters". Despite the failure of Shaam's previous films, this film managed to do average business.
