= Srimathumitha =

Indian playback and Carnatic singer

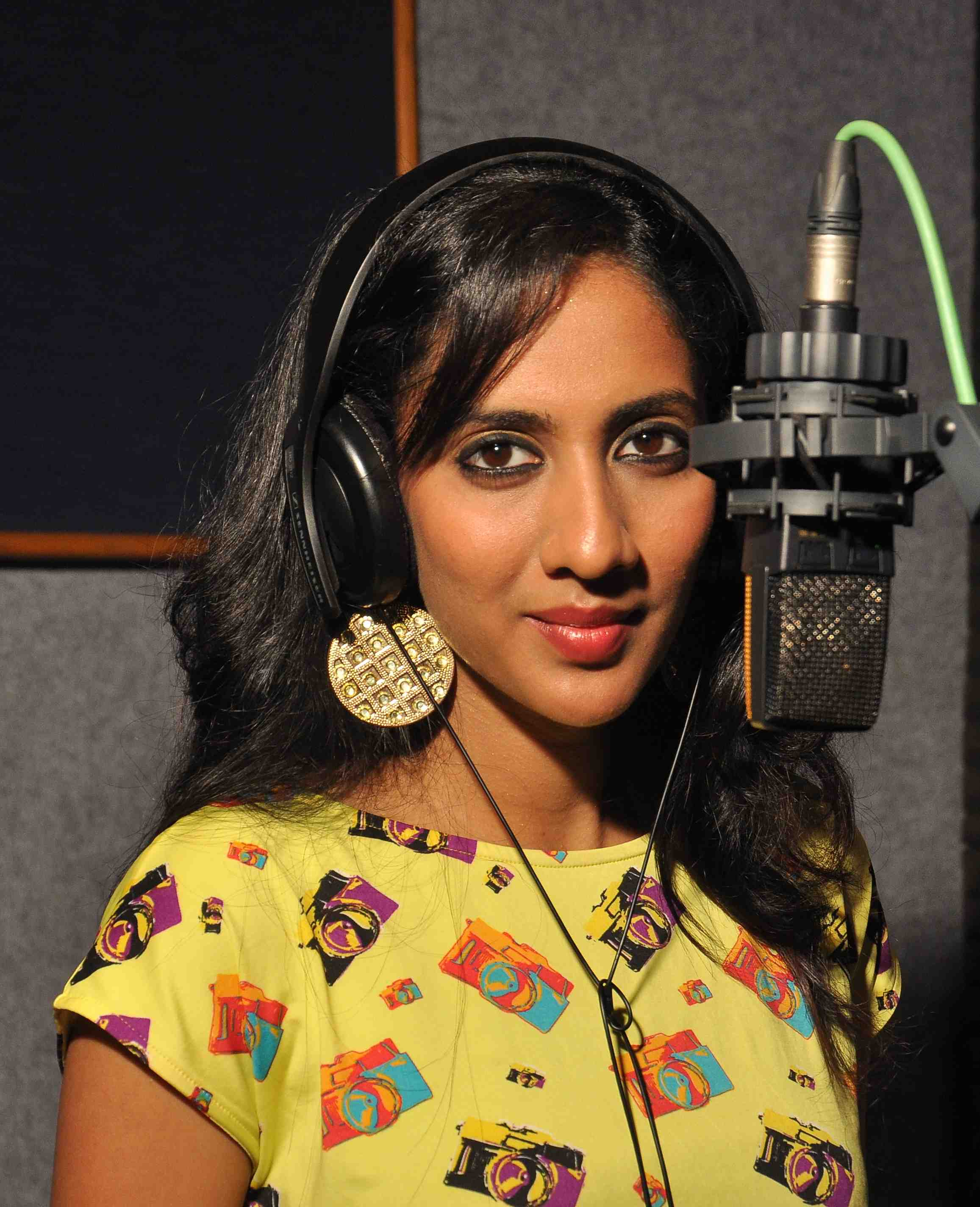
- Srimathumitha in a Recording

Background information
- Born: 21 March 1988 (age 38); Chennai, Tamil Nadu
- Genres: Carnatic music – Indian Classical Music and Playback singing
- Occupation: Singer
- Years active: 2003 – present

Srimathumitha is an Indian playback and Carnatic singer who sings mainly in Tamil. She has also sung in Telugu, Hindi and Kannada songs. Some of her notable songs are "Azhage Azhage" from the movie Oru Kal Oru Kannadi, "Valayapatti Thavile" from the movie Azhagiya Tamil Magan, "Kanaa Kaanum Kalangal" from the movie 7G Rainbow Colony, and "Rathathin Rathame" from the movie Velayudham. She has sung for leading music directors like Ilayaraja, Harris Jayaraj, Yuvan Shankar Raja, A. R. Rahman, Bharadwaj, Deva, S. A. Rajkumar, and Bharani. She emerged as the "Best Voice of 2002" in the TV Reality Show Rajageetham conducted by RAJ TV. She is the first playback singer to win the Vikadan Awards started in 2004, which was juried by late Sujatha. A. R. Rahman has featured her in two songs in the soundtrack of Oscar-winning film Slumdog Millionaire.

== Early life and family background ==
Srimathumitha with her Sister and Playback singer Charulatha Mani

Srimathumitha was born in Chennai to O. S. Mani and Hemalatha Mani, a Veena exponent. Her sister is Charulatha Mani, a playback and Carnatic singer. She is married to Ashwin Viswanathan.

== Carnatic music ==
Srimathumitha in a Carnatic Performance

Srimathumitha was born into a family of musicians. She started her formal training in Carnatic classical music under Padmashree Gayatri Shankaran. She has also undergone Shikshai for several years.

Her passion for M. S. Subbulakshmi led her to produce GITA cassettes bringing out her first solo CD, "PRODIGY SERIES HITS OF MS SUBBULAKSHMI" when she was 14. This album contained very challenging classical and Hindustani numbers from MS Amma's Meera, Shakuntalai, Savithri and Seva Sadhanam and was released by Vidushi Smt. R Vedavalli and Mellisai Mannar MS Viswanathan.

She has an avid interest in Sanskrit slokas. This has led Saregama to release her latest album, "HARE KRISHNA," featuring rare slokas on Lord Vishnu, including Sri Narasimha Kavacam, Sri Damodarashtakam, the enthralling Kalinga Nardhana Thillana, and Bhaja Govindam.

=== Concerts and performances ===
Srimathumitha with S.Janaki

- She recently performed in the Chennaiyil Thiruvaiyaaru concert conducted by Lakshman Shruthi Musicals and Vijay TV in Kamarajar Arangam, Teynampet, Chennai.
- She has been performing Classical Carnatic katcheris for many years and has performed at the Janmashtami Festival at Hare Krishna Temple, ISKCON Chennai in 2010 and 2011. These concerts have been recorded live and brought out as CDs.
- She has performed several thematic concerts for Doordarshan Podhigai on Lord Muruga shot at Arupadai Veedu Temple and recently on Lord Ganesh for Vinayakar Chathurthi which keeps getting telecasted on popular demand.
- "KRISHNAVATARA" was a concert performed by her at The Bharatiya Vidya Bhavan's Main Auditorium on 13 November 2011. She did a presentation and did a 2-hour concert of various kritis, Bhajans, Abhangs of various saint composers like Annamacharya, Purandaradasa, Thyagaraja, Abhanga, Meera and Andal on Lord Krishna. This concert was unique and one of its kind and garnered appreciation from all quarters.
- She has performed "AAMCHI MUMBAI SINGARA CHENNAI" concert by event art, collaborating with Singer Roop Kumar Rathod at Chennai in Feb 2013. She represented the music of Chennai.
- She has conceptualized and performed "SANGAMAM- UNITY IN DIVERSITY" a 2-hour package focusing on different genres of music like Classical Carnatic, Semi Classical Film songs, Ghazals and Bhajans for Jupiter Fine Arts Navarasa 2013 held at Rani Seethai Hall. It was a charity show for RMD Pain and Palliative care.

=== Awards and recognition ===
- Her tryst with winning several competitions began with the rendering of "GIRIDHARA GOPALA" sung by Smt. M. S. Subbulakshmi, dressed as Meera and winning the first prize from Violin Maestros Ganesh Kumaresh when she was just 5.
- She has won the first prize in several television shows, including Sapthaswarangal and RAJ TV's Rajageetham (Best Voice of 2002).
- In line with celebrating 50 years of Indian Independence she won the all India first prize in the National Integration songs contest held by The Music Academy in 1997. She was given the prize by the then ex-governor Shri.C.Subramaniam amidst an August gathering of prominent state and central government personalities.
- In 1999, she won the All India Ghazal Contest organized by Sangam Kala Group in New Delhi. She performed a Ghazal by renowned singer Runa Laila at Siri Fort, New Delhi. She was adjudged the winner by Bollywood greats like Yash Chopra, Uttam Singh and other judges.
- She was the winner of maximum first prizes in the year 1999 at the annual music competitions held by The Music Academy, Narada Gana Sabha, Mylapore Fine Arts, Indian Fine Arts, Thyaga Brahma Gana Sabha winning prizes in all composer categories in open age group including the coveted Tambura prize from Mylapore Fine Arts for Purandara Dasa Kritis and Swati Tirunal Kritis and winning in all Trinity kritis.
- She has won the All India first prize in Annamacharya Kritis held by Annamacharya Bhavana Vahini, Hyderabad, and received the prize from Minister Shri Arun Jaitley. Additionally, she has secured first prizes at Kritis, Ragam Thanam Pallavi competitions held by Navya Nataka Samithi, Hyderabad, Rasika Ranjani Sabha, and Trichy.
- She is a recipient of the CCRT scholarship and was also awarded the South Zone Cultural Cash Award upon completion of the stipulated period of the scholarship.
- She has received the first prize in Bharathiyar songs competition from Bharat Ratna Smt.M. S. Subbulakshmi herself.
- She has won the first prize in the Oothukadu Venkata Subbier Kritis contest for 5 consecutive years.

== Playback singing ==
Srimathumitha with Harris Jayaraj

Harris Jayaraj introduced her as a playback singer in the year 2003. She has worked in his music for several songs, ever since. She has sung in the name M.Madhumitha from her debut in 2003 till 2007. Later from 2007 till now, she is singing in the name Srimathumitha. She has sung in Child harmony for A. R. Rahman for many movies like Dil Se.., Lagaan, Pukar, Sangamam, Jana Gana Mana and Kannathil Muthamittal. She started her career as a playback singer with the song "Mudhal Mudhalai" in the movie Lesa Lesa. This was a peppy duet number in the music direction of Harris Jayaraj.Her first duet with Hariharan "Oddiyaanam" from the movie Arul composed again by Harris Jayaraj was a super hit chart buster and she had finished recording for the song in just 20 mins. She was spotted by Director Bala while singing chorus for the movie Nandhaa in Yuvan shankar raja music. He liked her voice and made her to sing a full song in the same movie. "Kanaa Kaanum Kalangal "from the movie 7G Rainbow Colony gave her a critical acclaim. She also won the Best Singer award from variety Cine Directory for this song and also VGP award. She has sung the title song for Iyakkunar Sigaram K.Balachander’s serial "Amudha Oru Acharyakuri" (Kalaignar TV) in Mr. Kannan's music. One of the coincidence is that her first song "Mudhal Mudhalai" from the Tamil movie Lesa Lesa was penned by the great lyricist late Vaalee Sir and the very last song written by him just before his demise, for the movie Kaaviya Thalaivan, was sung by her. "ISAI CAFÉ" shows that she did along with her sister Charulatha for RAJ TV was a worldwide success.

Srimathumitha with Lyricist Vaali

=== Concerts and performances ===
Srimathumitha with SPB

- She had toured USA for shows with Playback singer P. Unni Krishnan in 2003, the very year getting her first entry into playback singing.
- She has performed a one-woman show "DIVASFOREVER" showcasing evergreen film hits of singers P. Susheela, L. R. Eswari, Lata Mangeshkar and Asha Bhonsle in Tamil and Hindi at Narada Gana Sabha Main Auditorium for a full house audience of 1200 people.
- She has toured several countries like USA, UK, Canada, Sri Lanka, Australia, Kuwait and Dubai and has done several charity concerts all over the world and has sung alongside the great playback singers SPB, Shankar Mahadevan, Hariharan etc.
- She has done hundreds of shows worldwide in USA, Canada, London, Sri Lanka, Australia, Singapore and Malaysia and has been featured with legends like S. P. Balasubrahmanyam, S. Janaki and Yuvan Shankar Raja concert. She is very popular among Tamils worldwide.
- She has also done a lot of corporate shows and is known for her performance skills and entertaining showmanship on stage.
- Srimathumitha was invited by the Norway Tamil Film Festival in April to perform at the closing ceremony of the prestigious Norway Tamil Film Festival that is organized every year at Oslo to honour the very best of Tamil Cinema.
- She had rocked audiences at Europe on a tri-city tour of Switzerland, Paris, and Frankfurt for Christmas 2011 and New Year 2012. Her show at Zurich was one of the biggest Tamil shows held there with an audience turnover of over 4000 people the biggest Zurich has ever witnessed.
- She performed at "Tamil Puthaandu" Special program for Bharati Tamil Sangam, San Jose on 19 April 2014.
- She performed at the prestigious Wembley Arena, London for Kalaignar TV's "Maanada Mayilaada" Grand Finale Season 8 with singers like Velmurugan, which also saw the presence of Silambarasan, Trisha, Jeeva, Khushbu, Sundar C, Sivakarthikeyan and Shiva.

=== Awards and recognitions ===
- Best Playback Singer – Vikatan Awards
- Best Playback Singer 2004 – Variety Cine Directory Film Awards
- Best Playback Singer 2004 – Duke Awards
- Best Playback Singer – VGP Awards
- Best Playback Singer – Film Today Awards
- Music Achiever award from the University of Madras in its 150th year celebrations.

== Filmography ==
=== Tamil ===
Year	Film	Song	Composer	Co-singers
2002	Nandhaa	"Maayane Andha"	Yuvan Shankar Raja	Rajalakshmi
2002	Nandhaa	"Kalli Adi Kalli"	Yuvan Shankar Raja	Anuradha Sriram
2003	Lesa Lesa	"Mudhal Mudhalai"	Harris Jayaraj	Yugendran, Tippu
2003	Arul	"Oddiyaanam"	Harris Jayaraj	Hariharan
2003	Emage	"Sooriyanil Konjam"	J Suriea	
2004	Kadhal Dot Com	"Imaikkadha Vizhiyum"	Bharadwaj	Srinivas
2004	Ulla Kadathal	"evan yaroo"	Bharadwaj	Sathyan
2004	Ayodhya	"Bhagavaane"	Sabesh–Murali	
2004	7G Rainbow Colony	"Kanaa Kaanum Kaalangal"	Yuvan Shankar Raja	Ustad Sultan Khan
2004	7G Rainbow Colony	"Kanaa Kaanum Kaalangal" (Version II)	Yuvan Shankar Raja	Harish Raghavendra, Ustad Sultan Khan
2004	Idhu Kadhal Varum Paruvam	"Kakkai Siraginile"	Kasthuri Raja	
2004	Soori	"Vaanam Kunindhu"	Deva	Udit Narayan
2005	Ullam Ketkume	"Ennai Pandhada"	Harris Jayaraj	Srinivas
2005	Raam	"Vidigindra Pozhudhu"	Yuvan Shankar Raja	
2005	Adhu	"Oorale Thaan"	Yuvan Shankar Raja	
2005	Kalvanin Kadhali	"Tajmahal Oviya Kadhal"	Yuvan Shankar Raja	Vijay Yesudas
2005	Remote	"Kadhal Konden"	Paanabhadran	
2005	Aayudham	"Ada Naan Oru Maadhiri"	Dhina	Febi Mani
2005	Ayya	"Suthipoda Venama"	Bharadwaj	Tippu
2005	Sindhamal Sidharamal	"Satrumun Kidaitha"	Bharani	Harish Raghavendra
2006	Alayadikkudhe	"Mirchi Baby"	Bharani	
2006	Thodaamale	"Vanna Vanna"	S.A. Rajkumar	
2006	Paruthiveeran	"Sarigama"	Yuvan Shankar Raja	'Madurai' S. Saroja, Ameer Sultan
2007	Naalaiya Pozhuthum Unnodu	"Poovenbatha"	Srikanth Deva	Senthildass Velayutham
2007	Azhagiya Thamizh Magan	"Valayapatti Thavile"	A. R. Rahman	Naresh Iyer, Ujjayinee Roy
2008	Nenjathai Killadhe	"Naana Naane"	Premgi Amaren	
2008	Satrumun Kidaitha Thagaval	"Sai Sai"	Bala	Karthik
2009	Naan Kadavul	"Matha Un Kovilil"	Ilaiyaraaja	
2009	Yathumaagi	"Yaradhu Yaro"	James Vasanthan	Belli Raj
2009	Mayandi Kudumbathar	"Kalavaaniye"	Sabesh–Murali	Ranjith
2009	Vallakottai	"Magadheera"	Dhina	Tippu
2009	Kadhalan Kadhali	"Badham Pazham Pola"	Nandan Raj	
2009	Sathiram Perundhu Nilayam	"Yaaravano"	Sriram	
2010	Vengayam	"Ara Kirukkan"	Bharani	Suchith Suresan
2010	Goripalayam	"Enna Indha Matramo"	Sabesh–Murali	Karthik
2010	Siddhu +2	"Naan Alana Thamarai"	Dharan	Suchitra, Venkat Prabhu
2010	Aval Peyar Thamizharasi	"Ethanayo"	Vijay Antony	Mahalakshmi
2010	Vaanam Paatha Seemai	"Pattam Poochi"	Srikanth Deva	
2010	Soozhnilai	"Kanne Nee Solladi"	Dhina	
2010	Pen Singam	"Nee Sonnal"	Deva	Hariharan
2010	Naanum En Kadhalum	"Oru Vaarthai"	Mariya Manohar	
2010	Pachai Engira Kaathu	"Theeye Theeye"	R.Haribabu	
2010	Kalavani	"Oru Murai Iru Murai"	S. S. Kumaran	Harish Raghavendra
2011	Sagakkal	"Nee Enna Nenakkiriya"	Thayarathnam	Ranjith
2011	Velayudham	"Rathathin Rathame"	Vijay Antony	Haricharan
2012	Oru Kal Oru Kannadi	"Azhage Azhage"	Harris Jayaraj	Mukesh Mohamed
2014	Kaaviya Thalaivan	"Alli Arjuna"	A. R. Rahman	Haricharan, Bela Shende
2016	Iru Mugan	"Kannai Vittu"	Harris Jayaraj	Tippu, Pravin Saivi
2016	Dharma Durai	"Poi Vaada"	Yuvan Shankar Raja	
2017	Kadamban	"Otha Paarvayil"	Yuvan Shankar Raja	Yuvan Shankar Raja

=== Telugu ===
Year	Film	Song	Composer	Co-singers
2005	7G Brundavan Colony	"Kalalu Kane Kalalu"	Yuvan Shankar Raja	
2009	Ganesh Just Ganesh	"Yele Yele"	Mickey J Meyer	
2009	Ganesh Just Ganesh	"Rajkumari"	Mickey J Meyer	Kunal Ganjawala
2010	Maro Charitra	"Ninnu Nannu"	Mickey J Meyer	Shweta Pandit
2012	OKOK	"Areree Areree"	Harris Jayaraj	Mukesh Mohamed

=== Kannada ===
Year	Film	Song	Composer	Co-singers
	Shastri	"Sumne Sumne"	Sadhu Kokila	
2010	Gilli	"Kalasu Kaana"	Yuvan Shankar Raja	

=== Hindi ===
Year	Film	Song	Composer	Co-singers
2008	Slumdog Millionaire	"Liquid Dance"	A. R. Rahman	Palakkad Sriram
2008	Slumdog Millionaire	"Millionaire Theme"	A. R. Rahman	
2013	Chennai Express	"Titli" (Opening portion)	Vishal–Shekhar	Gopi Sunder, Chinmayi

== Albums ==
- Prodigy Series Hits of MS Subbulakshmi by M. Madhumitha – GIRI Trading
- Vande Mataram – GIRI Trading
- Bhakthi Sangeeth – Rhythm Music
- Hare Krishna – Saregama

In 2002, GIRI Trading produced her first ever audio album "PRODIGY SERIES HITS OF MS SUBBULAKSHMI in which she sang hits of the great M. S. Subbulakshmi, from movies like Meera, Sakuntalai, and Savithri etc. This album was released by the legendary music director M. S. Viswanathan.This album of hers is a great hit and is indeed a connoisseur’s delight. Her album titled "VANDE MATARAM" contains patriotic songs in 14 Indian languages, which are sure to instill a sense of patriotism and make every Indian feel proud.

Her avid interest in Sanskrit slokas has led Saregama to bring out her latest release "HARE KRISHNA" Rare slokas on Lord Vishnu featuring Sri Narasimha Kavacam, Sri Damodarashtakam, The enthralling Kalinga Nardhana Thillana and Bhaja Govindam.

== Other works ==
Srimathumitha with K.Balachander

- She has composed many singles with her sister and singer Charulatha Mani .
- Their "MACHI SONG" for Chennai Super Kings for IPL is a huge YouTube hit.
- In 2013, she released a private single titled "Why this Kolaveri Da".
- She has sung the title song for Iyakkunar Sigaram K. Balachander’s serial "Amudha Oru Acharyakuri" (Kalaignar TV) in Mr. Kannan's music.
