= Besant Ravi =

Indian actor

- Born: R. Ravi Kumar; 1 June 1970 (age 56); Besant Nagar, Madras, Tamil Nadu, India
- Occupations: Actor; Stuntman
- Years active: 1995–present
- Spouse: R. Prabhavathy
- Children: 2

Besant Ravi (born R. Ravi Kumar; 1 June 1970) is an Indian actor and stunt choreographer. He has played antagonistic supporting roles in Tamil, Hindi and several other Indian language films.

== Early life ==
Besant Ravi, who was born and brought up in Chennai, was a bike mechanic in his early stages of life, and all through his childhood days, he grew up watching film shootings near his house in Besant Nagar. He soon became familiar with the artists and technicians on the sets. Ravi is an expert in Mixed martial arts and boxing. He got his first break in cinema in the movie Lucky Man.

== Career ==
He got his first break in cinema in the movie Lucky Man, in which he performed a solo stunt, then he got trained professionally for cinema by stunt master Pandiyan. He started his career as a fighter and later moved into acting in several action sequences. Later, he got many offers to enter into the acting arena and got busy with acting. Director S. Shankar's Mudhalvan was noted among his projects.

== Filmography ==
=== Tamil ===
- Lucky Man (1995)
- Mudhalvan (1999)
- Kushi (2000)
- Unnai Kodu Ennai Tharuven (2000)
- Appu (2000)
- Ennamma Kannu (2000)
- Parthen Rasithen (2000)
- Vanna Thamizh Pattu (2000)
- Dheena (2001)
- Dhost (2001)
- Citizen (2001)
- Aanandham (2001)
- Majunu (2001)
- Thamizh (2002)
- Ezhumalai (2002)
- Charlie Chaplin (2002)
- Thamizhan (2002) (uncredited)
- Raajjiyam (2002)
- Thenkasi Pattanam (2002)
- Raja (2002)
- Manasellam (2003)
- Three Roses (2003)
- Villain (2002)
- Chokka Thangam (2003)
- Saamy (2003)
- Dum (2003)
- Pudhiya Geethai (2003)
- Aalukkoru Aasai (2003)
- Anjaneya (2003)
- Kuthu (2004)
- Yuga (2006)
- Suyetchai MLA (2006)
- Agaram (2007)
- Arul (2004)
- Jore (2004)
- Sullan (2004)
- Aayudham (2005)
- Maayavi (2005)
- Anniyan (2005)
- Aadhikkam (2005)
- Englishkaran (2005)
- Chinna (2005)
- Manthiran (2005)
- Kusthi (2006)
- Thagapansamy (2006)
- Saravana (2006)
- Sudesi (2006)
- Thalaimagan (2006)
- Thagapansamy (2006)
- Suriyan (2006)
- Pokkiri (2007)
- Deepavali (2007)
- Mayavi (2007)
- Nam Naadu (2007)
- Maa Madurai (2007)
- Thiru Ranga (2007)
- Thotta (2008)
- Vambu Sandai (2008)
- Ellam Avan Seyal (2008)
- Vasool (2008)
- Yogi (2009)
- Perumal (2009)
- Thoranai (2009)
- Ainthaam Padai (2009)
- Suriyan Satta Kalloori (2009)
- Singam (2010)
- Pen Singam (2010)
- Irumbukkottai Murattu Singam (2010)
- Nagaram Marupakkam (2010)
- Ponnar Shankar (2011)
- Vai Raja Vai (2015)
- Puthagam (2013)
- Vana Yuddham (2013)
- Pattathu Yaanai (2013)
- Soan Papdi (2013)
- Tenaliraman (2014)
- Kakki Sattai (2015)
- Eli (2015)
- Bhooloham (2015)
- Yennai Arindhaal (2015)
- Kaaki Sattai (2015)
- Gethu (2016)
- Saagasam (2016)
- Bairavaa (2017)
- Sathura Adi 3500 (2017)
- Goli Soda 2 (2018)
- The Legend (2022)
- Kaatteri (2022)
- Andhagan (2024)
- Rajakili (2024)
- Sumo (2025)
- Trending (2025)
- Dude (2025)
- Aiymbulan (2025)

=== Telugu ===
- Nenu Premisthunnanu (1997)
- Chinna (2001)
- Tholi Valapu (2001)
- Snehamante Idera (2001)
- Hanuman Junction (2001)
- Commander Jayanthi (2002)
- Sivamani (2003)
- Villain (2003)
- Andhrawala (2004)
- Suryam (2004)
- Annavaram (2006)
- Madesha (2008)
- Bujjigadu (2008)
- Pistha (2009)
- Ragada (2010)
- Aagadu (2014)
- Tiger Nageswara Rao (2023)

=== Malayalam ===
- Raavanaprabhu (2001)
- Black (2004)
- Thommanum Makkalum (2005)
- Sarkar Dada (2005)
- Ali Bhai (2007)
- Kabadi Kabadi (2008)
- Aandavan (2008)
- Chattambinadu (2009)
- Black Stallion (2010)
- Shikkar (2010)
- Christian Brothers (2011)
- Aravindante Athidhikal (2018)
- Turbo (2024)

=== Kannada ===
- Veera Kannadiga (2004)
- Nalla (2005)
- Shy (2006)
- Madesha (2008)
- Shivamani (2009)
- Machcha (2009)
- Santhu Straight Forward (2016)

=== Hindi ===
- Singham (2011)
- Policegiri (2013)
- Chennai Express (2013)
- Golmaal Again (2017)
- Simmba (2018)
- Dabangg 3 (2019)

=== Bengali ===
- Bikram Singha: The Lion Is Back (2012)

== Television ==
Year	Show	Role	Channel	Notes
2014	Adhu Idhu Yedhu	Contestant	Star Vijay	
2021	Survivor Tamil	Contestant	Zee Tamil	
2021	Master the Blaster	Contestant	Zee Tamil	
2021	Rowdy Baby	Contestant	Sun TV	He participated with his wife, Prabhavathy
2022	Joker Poker	Contestant	Zee Tamil	
2025	Top Cooku Dupe Cooku season 2	Contestant	Sun TV	Winner
