= Aayudham (2005 film) =

- DVD cover
- Directed by: M. A. Murugesh
- Written by: M. A. Murugesh; Kamaleshkumar (dialogues)
- Produced by: Surya Rajkumar
- Starring: Prashanth; Sneha
- Cinematography: Aravind Kamalanathan
- Edited by: A. K. Sankar
- Music by: Dhina
- Production companies: Mars Entertainment Group; Motion Pictures Partners International
- Release date: 14 January 2005
- Country: India
- Language: Tamil

Aayudham (transl. Weapon) is a 2005 Indian Tamil-language action film directed by M. A. Murugesh. It stars Prashanth and Sneha in the lead roles, while Vadivelu, Subbaraju, Rajesh, and Janagaraj play supporting roles. Featuring music composed by Dhina, the film was released on 14 January 2005 and performed average at the Tamil Nadu box office.

== Plot ==
Siva is admitted to a medical college in Chennai. His police constable father, gets a transfer to Chennai, as well, so that he can keep an eye on his son. Siva soon develops a liking towards Mahalakshmi, his collegemate. However, Naga, Maha's servant-maid's son and the dreaded don of Chennai city, is obsessed with making Maha his own.

Siva always comes on top and thwarts Naga's plans and ends up successfully getting him arrested! Siva and Maha celebrate and visit a temple. However this Joy is short lived, as Maha's father has been killed by Naga now released from prison.

Siva is then taken to an open ground dress torn and badly bruised in front of a heavily distraught Maha. Naga takes a metal rod and brutally beats up Siva much to Maha's horror. Siva tries to fight back with his remaining energy but is beaten up again by Naga giving him concussion. Naga proceeds to brutally pulverize until Siva loses consciousness and heavily bleeding.

Naga then tries to finish of Siva with a gun, but a memory of Mahalakshmi gives him a surge of energy and he ends up killing Naga and saving Maha!

== Cast ==
- Prashanth as Siva
- Sneha as Mahalakshmi
- Vadivelu as Thangapandi
- Subbaraju as Naga
- Rajesh as Siva's father
- Janagaraj as Naga's uncle
- Mansoor Ali Khan as Minister Andiappan
- Manobala as College Professor
- Santhana Bharathi
- Kalairani as Maha's House servant
- Ramji as Police
- Thalaivasal Vijay
- Ajay Rathnam
- Singamuthu
- Bonda Mani
- Besant Ravi
- Meenal Pendse (special appearance in the song "Sarakku Sarakku")
- Susan (special appearance in the song "Aalakala Visham")

== Production ==
The film was directed by M. A. Murugesh, who had previously directed the film, Indru Mudhal (2003). Sneha was selected to play the lead female role and began work on the film in May 2004. The first schedule of the film commenced in Chennai, where a dance number was shot at a lavish set costing ₹40 lakh (equivalent to ₹1.5 crore or US$170,000 in 2026) at AVM Studios, where Prashanth and fifty dancers took part. The second schedule of forty days was held at locations in Madurai, Thoothukudi, Tirunelveli, Kanyakumari and Nagercoil. Dance choreographer Dinesh choreographed two dance numbers – one in which Prashanth and Mumbai's Minal took part, the other where he danced with Rasna, a Mumbai model. The third schedule was filmed in London, including a song sequence shot near the River Thames. Fifty girls from the musical, Bombay Dreams, were selected to feature in Sungadi saris during a song shoot at Trafalgar Square.

== Soundtrack ==
The soundtrack was composed by Dhina. It was released on 3 October 2004 at Hotel Tulip Aruna in Chennai.

Song	Singer(s)	Lyrics
"Aalakala Visham"	Harini	Viveka
"Hormone Surrakuthu"	KK, Harini	Pa. Vijay
"Koottaan Choru"	Anuradha Sriram, Dhina	Pa. Vijay
"Naan Oru Mathiri"	Febi Mani, Srimathumitha	Snehan
"Sarakku Sarakku"	Karthik, Srilekha Parthasarathy	Snehan

== Release ==
Aayudham was released on 14 January 2005, during Pongal, and performed average at the Tamil Nadu box office. The film's release was hampered by the Boxing Day tsunami which hit Chennai the month before.

== Critical reception ==
Malathi Rangarajan of The Hindu noted that "it's all very fine if you are not looking for anything innovative in the entertainment offered", adding that "Prashanth is too experienced an actor to goof up the role. He plays Siva with ease. And as always he is more at home in action" and that "Sneha makes proper use of the couple of scenes that offer her a little scope to perform." Sify noted that film was "below average" and added "The film looks like a poor man’s Ghilli and the story is as old as the hills with no semblance of either style or substance."

Visual Dasan of Kalki wrote that Aayudham had taken the single line plot from third rated masala films like Jayam and Ghilli. He said exaggerations are key in such stories, but in Aayudham, the director was very careful to portray every scene in an interesting way and succeeded in it. Cinesouth wrote "Though the concept of the film is as old as it can be, that is, love- struggle- and triumph in love-, but, it is like serving old feast on a new flashy and flower designed plate". Malini Mannath of Chennai Online wrote, "It's familiar territory for the audience, with predictable situations, stereotyped characters and an already-seen-ambience. It is an amalgam of various films like 'Run', 'Gilli', 'Arul' etc. It does not quite keep up to the promise of the opening scenes".
