= Kuthu =

2004 film by A. Venkatesh

- Theatrical release poster
- Directed by: A. Venkatesh
- Written by: V. Prabhakar (dialogues)
- Screenplay by: A. Venkatesh
- Story by: V. V. Vinayak
- Produced by: K. C. N. Chandrasekar; Amudha Durairaj
- Starring: Silambarasan; Ramya; Kalabhavan Mani
- Cinematography: Venkatesh Anguraj
- Edited by: V. T. Vijayan
- Music by: Srikanth Deva
- Production company: Deivanai Movies
- Release date: 14 April 2004
- Running time: 146 minutes
- Country: India
- Language: Tamil

Kuthu (transl. Punch) is a 2004 Indian Tamil-language romantic action comedy film directed by A. Venkatesh, starring Silambarasan, Ramya and Kalabhavan Mani. It is a remake of the 2003 Telugu film Dil. The music was composed by Srikanth Deva, with cinematography by Venkatesh Anguraj and editing by V. T. Vijayan.

Kuthu was released on 14 April 2004 Tamil New Year and became a commercial success. Ramya was credited in later Tamil films by her birth name Divya Spandana because she disliked the nickname "Kuthu Ramya" that emerged after the release of this film.

== Plot ==
Gurumoorthy "Guru" is a sociable boy from a middle-class family. He lives with his parents- a doting mother and a strict but well-meaning father- and a playful maternal uncle, Senthil. He enrolls at the VOC College of Arts and Sciences, and falls in love with Anjali, a fellow student, who doesn't reciprocate his affections.

Anjali's father is the rich and powerful gangster Veerabahu, who is extremely protective of his daughter to the point that he brutally beats up a boy at a temple for brushing past her by accident. A misunderstanding results in Guru being beaten up by Veerabahu's men, who suspect that he and Anjali are lovers. After this, he vows to win Anjali's love for real. In due course, she falls in love with him too. How the lovers stand strong in the face of Veerabahu's increasingly desperate attempts to separate them forms the rest of the story.

== Cast ==
- Silambarasan as Gurumoorthy (Guru)
- Ramya as Anjali
- Vijayakumar as Guru's father
- Livingston as Adhi Kesav, College Principal
- Kota Srinivasa Rao as Annamalai, Anjali's grandfather
- Kalabhavan Mani as Veerabahu, Anjali's father
- Ilavarasu as Arunachalam
- Besant Ravi as Veerabahu's henchman
- Suman Setty as Ramanathan Jr. (Raja Ramanathan Bahadur's Grandson and a Board Member)
- Karunas as Senthil, Guru's uncle
- Manorama as Anjali's grandmother
- Ramya Krishnan (item number in the song "Pottu Thaakku")
- Mumtaj (item number in the song "Otha Viral Kattuna")
- Kuyili as Guru's mother
- Aishwarya as Meenakshi, Anjali's mother

Uncredited

- Cool Suresh as College Rowdy
- Ruthu as Anjali's friend
- Kannan Ponnaiya as Veerabahu's henchman
- Robert as himself (cameo appearance in the song "Pottu Thaakku")
- Ashok Raja as himself (cameo appearance in the song "Otha Viral Kattuna")

== Production ==
The film was announced in September 2003. Kannada actress Divya Spandana made her debut in Tamil with this film under the name "Ramya". A song was picturised with the lead pair in studios with an erected set costing ₹10 lakh (equivalent to ₹35 lakh or US$37,000 in 2023) while another song was shot at Thirumayam Kottai near Karaikudi with Ramya Krishnan which took three days to complete. The fight scene was shot at SRM College Grounds for 10 days. The songs were shot in Lebanon and Phuket, Thailand.

== Soundtrack ==
Soundtrack was composed by Srikanth Deva. It marked the debut of Assamese singer Zubeen Garg as a playback singer for this Tamil film as well as his first South Indian film.

Track listing
No.	Title	Lyrics	Singer(s)	Length
1.	"Otha Viral Kattuna"	Pa. Vijay	Shankar Mahadevan	5:31
2.	"Nibuna Nibuna"	Kalaikumar	Sadhana Sargam	5:39
3.	"Sappida Vada"	Kalaikumar	Udit Narayan, Malathy Lakshman	5:33
4.	"Pottu Thakku"	Vaali	Silambarasan, Roshini	5:08
5.	"Pachai Kili"	Palani Bharathi	Kunal Ganjawala, Srilekha Parthasarathy	4:48
6.	"Assana Assana"	Snehan	Zubeen Garg, Mahalakshmi Iyer	4:58
7.	"Ennai Theendi Vittai"	Thamarai	Prasanna Rao, Chinmayi	3:27
Total length:				35:04

== Critical reception ==
Malini Mannath of Chennai Online wrote, "A spirited youth falling in love with a local don's daughter and the hurdles he crosses... This subject has been hacked to death in quite a few films recently. That 'Kuthu' comes from the Telugu hit 'Dhil' is no excuse to push it down the throat of the viewers again!". Cinesouth wrote, "Director VEnkatesh has whipped up a formula for commercial success. 'Kuthu' sticks to it". Sify wrote, "For city slickers it is an ordeal to watch Kuthu meant strictly for the frontbenchers".
