= Aaru (film) =

- Poster
- Directed by: Hari
- Written by: Hari
- Produced by: Saran
- Starring: Suriya; Trisha
- Cinematography: Priyan
- Edited by: V. T. Vijayan
- Music by: Devi Sri Prasad
- Production company: Gemini Productions
- Release date: 9 December 2005
- Running time: 168 minutes
- Country: India
- Language: Tamil

Aaru (transl. Six) (Note: Also short for "Aarumugam", the title character.) is a 2005 Indian Tamil-language action drama film written and directed by Hari and produced by Saran. It stars Suriya in the title role as Aarumugam (Aaru). Trisha, Vadivelu, Kalabhavan Mani and Ashish Vidyarthi play supporting roles. The music was composed by Devi Sri Prasad, while the cinematography and editing were handled by Priyan and V. T. Vijayan respectively.

Aaru was released on 9 December 2005. It was not well-received by critics but became a commercial success.

== Plot ==
Aarumugam alias Aaru is raised by the sister of Vishwanathan, a gangster. Aaru respects Vishwanathan as his brother and is ready to go miles to keep him as the influential person in Chennai. When Vishwanathan declares war on his rival Kothanda Rama Reddy, Aaru assists him and Reddy's goons attack him, but Aaru overpowers them. Vishwanathan organises a protest and plots to kill Aaru's friends, but Aaru leaves the protest midway and proposes to his girlfriend Mahalakshmi, but she declines and gives him two months to change and orders him to stay away from her to test his loyalty and love. Aaru reluctantly accepts her decision.

Meanwhile, Aaru's friends are burnt alive during the protest as the kerosene was mixed with gasoline, even though Aaru had only requested kerosene. Filled with regret, Aaru vows to take exact vengeance. One day, Lingam tells that Vishwanathan's assistant Bhaskar had set fire to the petrol and kerosene. Immediately suspicious, Aaru tries to confront Vishwanthan, who claims that Reddy was behind this. However, Vishwanathan and Reddy made a deal to finish off Aaru in exchange for Reddy to have free rein over parts of Chennai as well as kidnapping and killing young girls. Aaru confronts Reddy and almost kills him until Reddy tells him the truthband also about Vishwanathan's true nature.

Betrayed, Aaru slices Reddy's neck and vows to destroy Vishwanathan's power. Aaru kidnaps Vishwanathan's third younger brother, Jaganathan and slices his hand, where he challenges Vishwanathan to save his near ones as he will not spare anyone. Rajavelu, a corrupt cop and Vishwanathan's brother-in-law, obtains a shooting order to shoot Aaru, where he swears to murder Aaru due to a conflict. Aaru plans to attack Vishwanathan's first younger brother, Bhoominathan, who insulted and degraded Aaru several times. During a property registration, Aaru and his men wears masks and break into the registrar's office, where Aaru and his men hacks Bhoominathan and escapes.

Rajavelu fires a bullet into Aaru's shoulder, but Aaru manages to escape. With many hospitals on alert, Maha's friend treats Aaru at her house, where Maha realises Aaru's love and accepts his feelings. Aaru calls Vishwanathan and torments him regarding Bhoominathan's plight, causing Vishwanathan to kill Bhoominathan by unplugging the machine providing life to Bhoominathan. Vishwanathan kills many of Aaru's allies, while Rajavelu arrests Maha and a female officer harasses her in the station for helping Aaru, hoping for Aaru to surrender in order to save Maha's dignity. An enraged Aaru breaks into the police station and takes Maha to safety.

Vishwanathan's second younger brother Loganathan and Bhaskar follow behind to finish Aaru, but Aaru sends her safely in a boat to Sri Lanka. Loganathan and Bhaskar fight Aaru, but Aaru overpowers them and nearly burns them until Loganathan begs Aaru to spare them. Aaru tells Loganathan to kill Bhaskar and Bhaskar hesitates due to their many years of friendship. Loganathan burns Bhaskar alive, but Bhaskar angrily runs into Loganathan, making him catch on fire and leading to their deaths. Rajavelu pretends to arrest Aaru with other officers and thrashes him.

Aaru, still nearly unconscious, overhears Rajavelu telling Vishwanathan he can come and kill Aaru. Realising that Rajavelu is tricking everyone, Aaru wakes up and beats Rajavelu, tying him to a tree and punching him unconscious. Vishwanathan arrives and engages in combat with Aaru, but Aaru overpowers him and cuts off Vishwanathan's arms. He tells him that Vishwanathan should realise the pain felt by his friends, who were burnt and betrayed. Realising that Aaru is right, Rajavelu surrenders to him. Aaru serves his prison term and gets released, where he reunites with Maha and the two leave for Pune to start their new lives.

== Cast ==
- Suriya as Aarumugam
- Trisha as Mahalakshmi
- Vadivelu as Sundi Mothiram (Sumo)
- Ashish Vidyarthi as Vishwanathan
- Kalabhavan Mani as Rajavelu
- Jaya Prakash Reddy as Kothanda Rama Reddy
- Delhi Ganesh as Poongavanam, Aarumugam's father
- Nizhalgal Ravi as Sundaram, Mahalakshmi's father
- Raj Kapoor as Bhoominathan
- Aishwarya as 'Sound' Saroja, Aarumugam's area mate
- Malavika as Vimala, Rajavelu's wife
- Tharika as Chitra, Mahalakshmi's friend
- Crane Manohar as Suggu, Aarumugam's friend
- Madhan Bob as Eknath
- Thambi Ramaiah as Shanmugam, Sumo's sidekick
- Singamuthu as Rangarajan Iyer, Aarumugam's area mate
- Aryan Rajesh as Jeganathan
- Halwa Vasu as Raasu
- Chaams as Rajamani
- Muthalvan Saran as priest
- Swaminathan as Venugopal Reddy
- Citizen Mani as cattle herder
- Shankar Narayanan as Chinna
- Bonda Mani as Mani
- Sampath Ram as Reddy's henchman

Uncredited

- Mohammed Masthan as Loganathan
- Sathyan as Kailash
- Amirthalingam as an aeroplane accident victim
- Kalyan (special appearance in the song "Nenjam Enum")

== Production ==
Director Saran made his debut as a producer in this film by floating a production house Gemini Productions, named after his 2002 film Gemini.

== Soundtrack ==
Aaru

Soundtrack album by Devi Sri Prasad
- Released: 2005
- Genre: Feature film soundtrack
- Length: 28:42 (Tamil); 28:17 (Telugu)
- Languages: Tamil; Telugu
- Labels: Star Music (Tamil); Aditya Music (Telugu)

Devi Sri Prasad chronology
Mazhai (2005)	Aaru (2005)	Pournami (2006)
External audio
- Aaru – Tamil – Jukebox on YouTube
- Aaru – Telugu – Jukebox on YouTube

The soundtrack was composed by Devi Sri Prasad and released by Star Music in India and Ayngaran in other international territories. The audio was launched on 11 November 2005 in a soft manner.

Track listing – Tamil
No.	Title	Lyrics	Singer(s)	Length
1.	"Soda Bottle"	Na. Muthukumar	Shankar Mahadevan, Mukesh Mohamed	5:26
2.	"Paakatha"	Na. Muthukumar	Tippu, Sumangali	4:25
3.	"Freeya Vudu"	Na. Muthukumar	Jassie Gift, Vadivelu, Mukesh Mohamed, M. L. R. Karthikeyan, Grace Karunas	4:34
4.	"Thottutea"	Pa. Vijay	Sunitha Sarathy, Karthik	4:30
5.	"Nenjam Enum (Bit)"	Hari	Gopika Poornima	1:40
6.	"Dhrogam"	Na. Muthukumar	Hariharan	3:40
7.	"Nenjam Enum"	Na. Muthukumar	Srinivas, Kalpana	4:27
Total length:				28:42

Track listing – Telugu
No.	Title	Lyrics	Singer(s)	Length
1.	"Soda Bottle"	Sahithi	Devi Sri Prasad, Saaki, Mukesh	5:23
2.	"Choododde Nannu"	Chandrabose	Sumangali	4:22
3.	"Tension Vaddu Mama"	Sahithi	Jassie Gift, Grace Karunas, M. L. R. Karthikeyan	4:30
4.	"Puttanata Puttanata"	Sahithi	Sagar, Sunitha Sarathy	4:28
5.	"Hrudayam Anu (Female)"	Sahithi	Gopika Poornima	1:36
6.	"Droham"	Suddala Ashok Teja	Karthikeyan	3:35
7.	"Hrudayam Anu"	Sahithi	Srinivas, Srilekha Parthasarathy	4:23
Total length:				28:17

== Release ==
Aaru was censored "A" (adults only) by the Central Board of Film Certification (CBFC) due to excessive violence. Although Hari and Saran were willing to make cuts to receive a U/A certificate (parental guidance), the CBFC did not agree. The film was released on 9 December 2005. After the success of Ghajini, Suriya had a similar opening as Aaru released with approximately 171 prints in Tamil Nadu. The opening weekend tickets for the film had been sold out in Chennai.

== Critical reception ==
Sify wrote "Aaru offers neither insight nor content-just unmitigated violence. This prolonged film is difficult to bear." Lajjavathi of Kalki wrote that since Suriya is recognised in Andhra Pradesh, it seems that they have tried to satisfy the fans there. The excitement till the end descends to the point of boredom due to the violent scenes. Malini Mannath of Chennai Online wrote "It's director Charan's first production venture and there are no pretensions here. For 'Aaru' is just what it professes to be. A total violent action flick, which may not be an ideal fare for the faint-hearted, but a fitting one for an action lover".
