= Seval =

- Directed by: Hari
- Written by: Hari
- Produced by: M. A. Jinnah
- Starring: Bharath; Poonam Bajwa; Simran; Vadivelu
- Cinematography: Priyan
- Edited by: V. T. Vijayan
- Music by: G. V. Prakash Kumar
- Production company: Jinnah Creations
- Distributed by: Ayngaran International
- Release date: 27 October 2008
- Running time: 157 minutes
- Country: India
- Language: Tamil

Seval (Tamil pronunciation: [seːval]; transl. Rooster) is a 2008 Indian Tamil-language period romantic action drama film written and directed by Hari and produced by M. A. Jinnah. It stars Bharath, Poonam Bajwa, Simran, and Vadivelu, while Sampath Raj, Prem, Y. G. Mahendran, Rajesh, Yuvasri, and Shanmugarajan play supporting roles. The music was composed by G. V. Prakash Kumar with cinematography by Priyan and editing by V. T. Vijayan. The film released on 27 October 2008.

== Plot ==
The film begins with Murugesan being released from the Central Jail, Palayamkottai, after 17 years. The story rewinds to 1991 when he was an unruly youngster in Sivasailam village near Tenkasi. His parents are flower-sellers.

Life is a long, sunny adventure for Murugesan, who beats people up, sells his grandfather's land, runs over rooftops, and incurs so much of his father's wrath that he is prophesied to meet a horrible end – not that this gloomy prospect affects him. He continues on his own sweet way until he runs into Parijatham, a demure and beautiful Iyer girl, the daughter of Panjami Iyer and the younger sister of Gayatri Iyer.

Meanwhile, the village's bigwig Periyavar, who is magnanimous in public and a tyrant at home, casts his eyes on Parijatham. He places his pawns carefully and cautiously so as not to be found out. Periyavar and Murugesan come close to fighting many times, but the situations defuse themselves naturally.

Several twists in the tale occur, and Murugesan and Parijatham are bound in a net from which there is seemingly no escape.

== Cast ==
- Bharath as Murugesan
- Poonam Bajwa as Parijatham, (Voice Dubbed By Renuka Kathir)
- Simran as Gayathri (voiced dubbed by Savitha Reddy)
- Vadivelu as Thapaal Thangavelu
- Sampath Raj as Periyavar
- Prem as Gayathri and Parijatham's husband
- Y. G. Mahendran as Panjami Iyer
- Rajesh as Murugesan's father
- Yuvasri as Murugesan's mother
- Shanmugarajan as Rajalingam
- Madhan Bob as Pasudesan, veterinary doctor
- Meera Krishnan
- Singamuthu as Cow Owner
- Priyanka as Annakili
- Five Star Krishna
- Manobala
- Kavithalayaa Krishnan
- Periya Karuppu Thevar
- Thennavan
- MRK
- Vellai Subbaiah
- Citizen Mani
- Theni Murugan
- Bava Lakshmanan
- Rail Ravi
- Vengal Rao

== Soundtrack ==
The songs were composed by G. V. Prakash Kumar in his first collaboration with Hari.

Seval

Soundtrack album by G. V. Prakash Kumar
- Released: 24 September 2008
- Genre: Feature film soundtrack
- Label: Ayngaran Music; An Ak Audio; Think Music

G. V. Prakash Kumar chronology
Naan Aval Adhu (2008)	Seval (2008)	Ullasa Utsaha (2009)

Songs	Singers	Lyrics
"Kannamma Kannamma"	Vijay Yesudas, S. Gayathri	Na. Muthukumar
"Namma Ooru Nallaarukku"	Tippu, Manikka Vinayagam, Anuradha Sriram, Mahathi, Shreya Ghoshal, Prashanthini	Na. Muthukumar
"Odamarathu Mullapola"	Benny Dayal	Na. Muthukumar
"Paarvaile Oru Yekkam"	Naresh Iyer	Na. Muthukumar
"Thaayaramma Thaayaaru"	Karthik, Vadivelu	Hari
"Thulasi Chediyum Aralipoovum"	Hariharan, Deepa Miriam	Hari

== Release ==
The satellite rights of the film were sold to Kalaignar TV. It was premiered in television on 25 December 2009 coinciding Christmas festival and "Velli Parisu".

== Critical reception ==
Sify wrote, "The film just drives you crazy, and story telling itself is confusing with a lot of plot holes. At times it is hard to tell what the film is about, though it is very predictable at every turn as Hari has taken certain scenes and situations from his earlier films!". Behindwoods wrote, "Looking at Seval, one does not know whether Hari has tried to be different or is it the execution that went wrong. Clearly, this was made by a really ‘out of form’ Hari who generally delivers great results."
