= Bhooloham =

2015 Indian film by N. Kalyanakrishnan

- Theatrical release poster
- Directed by: N. Kalyanakrishnan
- Written by: S. P. Jananathan (Dialogue)
- Screenplay by: N. Kalyanakrishnan
- Story by: N. Kalyanakrishnan
- Produced by: V. Ravichandran
- Starring: Ravi Mohan; Trisha; Prakash Raj; Nathan Jones
- Cinematography: S. R. Sathish Kumar
- Edited by: V. T. Vijayan; N. Ganesh Kumar
- Music by: Srikanth Deva
- Production company: Aascar Film (P) Ltd
- Distributed by: Aascar Film (P) Ltd
- Release date: 24 December 2015
- Running time: 143 minutes
- Country: India
- Language: Tamil

Bhooloham (transl. World) is a 2015 Indian sports action film co-written and directed by N. Kalyanakrishnan and produced by V. Ravichandran. It stars Ravi Mohan (credited as Jayam Ravi) and Trisha, while Nathan Jones and Prakash Raj play supporting roles. The music was composed by Srikanth Deva with cinematography by S. R. Sathish Kumar and editing by V. T. Vijayan and N. Ganesh Kumar. The film, which began during 2011, had been in post-production for a long time and was released on 24 December 2015.

== Plot ==
There are two rival boxing factions in North Madras: Irumbu Manithar Rasamanickam and Nattu Marunthu Vaathiyar. The Irumbu Manithar boxer Mariappan's son is Arumugam, and the Nattu Marunthu boxer Munusamy's son is Bhooloham. Now, in the present, the Irumbu Manithar boxer is Arumugam, while the Nattu Marunthu boxer is Bhooloham.

Bhooloham has a severe grudge against Arumugam because Mariappan had defeated Munusamy in a boxing match. Unable to bear this loss, Munusamy committed suicide by hanging himself. Bhooloham wants to avenge his father's death by killing Arumugam in the match. This rivalry is being used by Deepak Shah, an intelligent TV CEO, to make money through his FSC (Future Sports Channel) Independent Boxing Cup. Deepak exploits the boxers' innocence and makes them fight to gain TRPs. In the inaugural Match of IBC, Bhooloham hits Arumugam to the extent that he goes into a coma.

Bhooloham later realises his mistake and becomes a Saamiyar (saintly person). He gets a job at his love interest Sindhu's college as a waiter. Meanwhile, Deepak, who is hell-bent on fixing Bhooloham's match with Destroyer Gurudayal, hatches a conspiracy. Bhooloham, who desperately needs money to fund Arumugam's operation, falls prey to Deepak's plan. Because Bhooloham hits Dayal after the match, he gets disqualified. Unable to bear Bhooloham's loss, his coach Rathinam Master commits suicide by consuming poison.

Meanwhile, Deepak plans to bring in Steven George, a psychotic American boxer, to kill Dayal to increase the TRPs of the channel. When Dayal tries to leave the tournament, Deepak threatens him that he will kill his family. Under pressure, Dayal lodges a complaint against Deepak in the Boxing Union. There, Bhooloham declares that he will fight against Steven, not to show his supremacy, but to expose Deepak's wrongdoings. He reveals that Deepak was pressuring Rathinam to enter the ring against Dayal, and when Bhooloham got disqualified, Deepak deceived him. The Union supports Bhooloham, and they make a plan that Steven will declare that he will fight against Bhooloham. The plan succeeds, and Deepak, though reluctant, has to go to the Union Office to sign Bhooloham for the fight.

Bhooloham partially rejects the agreement that Deepak posed against him, as Bhooloham correctly predicted Deepak's intention to make exorbitant profit and pass the earnings from the sports channel only to Deepak's clan and deprive Bhooloham of their due share of profit earned from boxing, Bhooloham openly opposes Deepak's cunning plan in the union office and strictly advises Deepak that he will participate in the upcoming match with Steven only if an international referee is present in the ring. Due to the match's potential for immense profit, Deepak, though reluctant, is forced to sign the agreement created by Bhooloham and the Boxing Union. This incident annoys Deepak, so he cunningly plans to take revenge by killing Bhooloham. After signing the agreement, Deepak tells Steven that he will give Steven his lifetime earnings in a single match if he kills Bhooloham using a foul punch. Steven agrees to this condition and practices hard for the match.

The match happens, and to Deepak's shock, Bhooloham wins because he does not stop when Steven hits the foul punch, and partly because of Arumugam's encouragement and advice to hit Steven near the hip bone, making Steven lose his strength. After the match, Bhooloham exposes Deepak's wrongdoings. After losing the match, Steven becomes ashamed and realises his mistake. He reveals that Deepak offered him $40 million to kill Bhooloham through a foul. As a result, the FSC is sealed for a lifetime, and Deepak is jailed for his malpractices. The movie ends with Bhooloham, Steven, Arumugam, and Dayal holding the trophy together and saying that they are all winners.

== Cast ==
- Ravi Mohan as Bhooloham
- Trisha as Sindhu
- Prakash Raj as Deepak Shah, CEO of FSC (Future Sports Channel)
- Ponvannan as Rathinam Master
- Shanmugarajan as Arumugam's master
- L. S. Rajesh as Arumugam
- Arpit Ranka as Destroyer Gurudayal
- Nathan Jones as Steven George
- Chaams as Aalayam
- Ravi Mariya as Thiruvengadam
- Besant Ravi as "Black Tiger" Munusamy
- Narayan as Bhoopathy
- Bala Singh as Boxing Club Member
- Boys Rajan as TV Executive
- Azhagu
- Sakthivel
- Shwetha Bandekar as TV VJ
- Sai Dheena as Arumugam's henchman
- Kadhal Saravanan

Uncredited

- Akila as Arumugam's wife
- Bava Chelladurai as Professor Chandrasekhar

== Production ==
Jayam Ravi agreed terms to star in the film in August 2010, shortly after he had begun work for Engeyum Kadhal (2011) and Ameerin Aadhi-Bhagavan (2013). During the making of the Peraanmai (2009), Kalyanakrishnan, who was an assistant director to S. P. Jananathan, had narrated the story of the film and Ravi agreed to give priority dates for the film. However, delays in production of the former two films resulted in the postponement of the shoot of Bhooloham. This was due to the character in Ameerin Aadhi-Bhagavan requiring Ravi to sport a beard. In July 2011, it was reported that Ravi underwent a special training course in boxing for his role as a boxer with professional athlete, Prasad, overseeing his progress.

Amala Paul was approached by the producers in March 2012 to play the leading female role, but could not allot dates for the film. Subsequently, the team approached Nayantara to play the lead role but her unavailability saw the team agree terms with Trisha to play a role in the film. The film is inspired from the life of a real life Asian boxing champion named Madhan. The makers hired the Australian wrestler-turned-actor Nathan Jones for a fight sequence.

The film experienced delays after producer V. Ravichandran was unhappy about the film having more than half an hour dedicated to boxing scenes and put the film on hold, in order to edit the film's content. In early 2015, the Indian Overseas Bank's Sriram Nagar branch filed a petition in The Debt Recovery Tribunal (DRT), Chennai and requested to an interim stay on the film after Ravichandran failed to repay the loan amount he bought for the production expense of Bhooloham.

== Soundtrack ==
The music was composed by Srikanth Deva, uniting with Ravi for the second time after M. Kumaran Son of Mahalakshmi (2004), where Ravi also played a boxer.

Song	Singers	Lyrics
"Bhoologam Adicha"	Sree Tamizh, Aslam Mustafa, Tupakeys	Sree Tamizh, Vijay Sagar
"Ivan Chennai"	Haricharan	Parinaman
"Maasana Kollaiyila"	Mukesh	Vijay Sagar
"Tattoo Tattoo"	Vaishali, Abhay Jodhpurkar, MC Vickey, Chinmayi	Vijay Sagar
"Vaangi Vantha"	Fefsi Doss	Vijay Sagar
"Vanakkam Vanakkam"	Ebi, Naveen Madhav	Vijay Sagar

== Critical reception ==
Anupama Subramanian of Deccan Chronicle rated the film 3 out of 5 and wrote, "A few shortcomings aside, Bhooloham is a refreshingly fun and entertaining watch. The movie will definitely get your adrenaline glands flowing. Watch it for Jayam Ravi’s extraordinary effort!" M Suganth of The Times of India gave 3 out of 5 and wrote, "The film wants us to believe that a TV channel can wield an inordinate amount of power over the viewers, who will hardly question its decisions. But what mainly lets it down is the predictability of the plot." Sify wrote, "On the whole, this film is a good one-time watch, for Jayam Ravi's performance, if not anything else. You will not be disappointed".
