= Saamy =

- Theatrical release poster
- Directed by: Hari
- Written by: Hari
- Produced by: K. Balachander (Presenter); Pushpa Kandasamy
- Starring: Vikram; Trisha
- Cinematography: Priyan
- Edited by: V. T. Vijayan
- Music by: Harris Jayaraj
- Production company: Kavithalayaa Productions
- Release date: 1 May 2003
- Running time: 161 minutes
- Country: India
- Language: Tamil
- Budget: ₹5 crore
- Box office: ₹25 crore

Saamy is a 2003 Indian Tamil-language action thriller film written and directed by Hari and produced by Pushpa Kandasamy under the banner of Kavithalayaa Productions and presented by K. Balachander. The film stars Vikram in the titular role of DCP C. Aaru Saamy IPS. Trisha, Kota Srinivasa Rao (in his Tamil debut), Vijayakumar, Ramesh Khanna and Vivek play supporting roles. The music was composed by Harris Jayaraj, while the cinematography and editing were handled by Priyan and V. T. Vijayan, respectively.

Saamy was released on 1 May 2003 and became a major commercial success. The film was remade in Telugu as Lakshmi Narasimha (2004), in Kannada as Ayya (2005), in Hindi as Policegiri (2013), and in Bengali as Barood. Along with Kaakha Kaakha, the film popularised police genre films in Tamil cinema. A sequel titled Saamy Square was released in 2018.

== Plot ==
Aarusaamy alias Saamy arrives in Tirunelveli city market as a drunk goon and wanders around the city for two days, where he learns about the socio-political situation. Saamy witnesses a pickpocketer in the guise of a cop trying to extort money from a person, and he thrashes him. The police arrive at the scene and Saamy reveals himself as the new DCP of Tirunelveli while ordering the police to arrest the swindler posing as a cop. Saamy later assembles the police force and rules out their procedures so that they can do whatever they wish, provided the public and the innocent are not harmed in the process. He also tells them to arrest any thug without second thoughts.

Due to Saamy's administration, the crime rate in Tirunelveli has decreased. At the outset, Saamy pretends to be a corrupt cop by accepting bribes from Perumal Pichai, an influential and corrupt politician, under the condition that his illegal activities will not be monitored while advising him to move his liquor stores elsewhere to avoid disturbance to the public. Perumal accepts, merely out of an assumption that Saamy belongs to his caste. Saamy falls in love with Bhuvana, a college-going Brahmin girl. Bhuvana's father Srinivasan is a government officer leading a noble life. Saamy and Bhuvana meet each other when he leaves with Inspector Punctuality Paramasivam in search of a home for rent.

Bhuvana misinterprets Saamy and Paramasivam as thieves and locks them in a room, only to reveal their identities to the police. Their frequent rendezvous turn to love. One day, Saamy seals Perumal's gas station because the workers assaulted a woman and others when they challenged them with a much less distribution of petrol than being promised. This infuriates Perumal, who storms into Saamy's quarters with Bhuvana being present, and they argue. Bhuvana gets upset when Perumal mentions the bribe Saamy had taken from him, leaving her home. The next day, Saamy meets Bhuvana at the temple and reveals his past.

Saamy's father Chokkalingam aspires to become a cop, but he is unable to fulfill his dream due to corruption. Chokkalingam takes care of agriculture as his living, but he wants to make Saamy a cop. Saamy passes the TNPSC exams but is asked for bribes. Chokkalingam mortgages his properties and makes him get the police job. Being an honest cop, Saamy is honoured with transfers all over Tamil Nadu due to political pressure. In Trichy, Saamy is accused of bribery and gets suspended. After 6 months, Saamy proves his innocence, and he is finally posted back to Tirunelveli. Saamy adopted a new policy, where he takes bribes from influential persons and donates them for the public's welfare.

After learning this, Bhuvana reconciles with Saamy, and after much coercion, Srinivasan agrees to their engagement. The ruling party calls for a day strike in the state, and Perumal is to handle the responsibility of Tirunelveli on the eve of Pongal. The retail vendors plead with Saamy to protect the Pongal festival is a very important sales time. Saamy takes steps to maintain law and order and manages to halt the strike, which enrages Perumal. Perumal tells his henchmen to attack the market on the day of Saamy and Bhuvana's marriage since all the cops will be attending the wedding. Saamy witnesses the brutality of Perumal's men and this incident begins their enmity.

Saamy receives his transfer order to Dindigul with a week of duty remaining in the city. Saamy challenges to close Perumal's empire and finish him in that week, which he succeeds by using various enforcement tactics. Saamy arrests the main accomplices of Perumal and imprisons them for a 15-day period. Saamy covertly kills Perumal's main enforcers in a riot caused by him during a procession. Saamy advises Bhuvana to leave for Pazhani. After listening to Perumal's phone calls in the evening, Sammy realises that Perumal has planned to bomb somewhere. Saamy meets with Perumal's henchman, whom he spared in the rally shooting, and convinces the henchman to turn approver. Saamy finds that the bomb is to be detonated in his house.

Unknown to Saamy, Chokkalingam has arrived at his house from Pazhani. Despite Saamy's attempts to warn Chokkalingam, the bomb detonates, killing Chokkalingam. The bomb maker and Perumal's henchman provide statements to the DC and Saamy is provided an arrest warrant against Perumal. Despite hurdles by the authorities and ministers to stop the arrest, Saamy leaves to arrest Perumal. On the final day eve, Saamy provides news to the media that Perumal has absconded and the cops are searching for him. Saamy routes Perumal to his sand quarry. After a brief fight, Perumal surrenders to Saamy and scoffs at him. Saamy refuses and kills Perumal with his illicit revolver, where he burns his corpse in a brick kiln to keep Perumal's death a secret. In the aftermath, Saamy performs Chokkalingam's rites.

== Cast ==
- Vikram as DCP Aarusaamy Chockalingam (C. Aarusaamy) IPS
- Trisha as Bhuvana
- Kota Srinivasa Rao as Perumal Pichai
- Ramesh Khanna as Inspector "Punctuality" Paramasivam
- Vivek as Venkataraman Iyengar
- Delhi Ganesh as Srinivasan Iyengar, Bhuvana's father
- Sumithra as Janaki Iyengar, Bhuvana's mother
- Vennira Aadai Moorthy as Rangarajan Iyengar, Bhuvana's grandfather
- Manorama as Pattammal Iyengar, Bhuvana's grandmother
- Keerthana as Meenakshi Iyengar, Venkatraman's wife and Bhuvana's elder sister
- Vijayakumar as Chockalingam, Aarusaamy's father
- Rajesh as Judge Sivaraman
- Thyagu as MLA Aiyarettu Sundaram
- Bala Singh as MLA Aatangkarai Shanmugam
- Ponnambalam as a pickpocketer in a cop's disguise
- Crane Manohar as Velu, Aarusaamy's supporter
- Singamuthu as Parasuram Iyer, Agraharam Resident
- Ilavarasu as Sivakasi Pattasu Raman
- MRK as Narayanan
- Besant Ravi as Shankar
- Sethu Vinayagam as Ramadurai
- Nellai Siva as Subramani, Perumal Pichai's supporter
- Bayilvan Ranganathan as Ramasamy, Perumal Pichai's supporter
- Cell Murugan as Traffic Inspector
- Benjamin as Kuppan
- Vandhana as Gayathri, Bhuvana's friend
- Sakthivel as D. D. Dhandapani, police officer
- S. Ramana Girivasan as Police Inspector Nallamuthu
- Sri Latha as Lalitha, Paramasivam's wife
- Karna Radha as Police Constable Vetri
- Jayamani as Police Constable Moorthi
- Chelladurai as Police Constable Manikkam
- Azhagu as Party Secretary Selvarasu
- Lambert as Durai, Perumal Pichai's henchman
- Chaplin Balu as Balu, donkey's bridegroom
- Pattukkottai Sivanarayana Moorthy as Shanmugam, Aarusaamy's relative
- Japan Kumar in the song "Thirunelveli Halwada"
- Srividya as Chokkalingam's wife, Saamy's mother (photo presence only).

== Production ==
After Hari directed Thamizh (2002), the production company, Kavithalayaa Productions called him to direct a film for them since Hari assisted in some of their films. The film was titled as Saamy, with Ajith Kumar initially considered to play the lead role before he was replaced by Vikram. Though Vikram had earlier portrayed a police officer in Kaaval Geetham (1992), his father discouraged him from accepting Saamy, feeling he did not look like a police officer, but Vikram still signed the film. Trisha was selected as the makers wanted an actress who had never acted with Vikram as his pair before.

Some fight scenes were shot at the busy lanes in Karaikudi. The climax fight scene was shot for nearly five days. A set resembling Thirunelveli market designed by art director Kathir was built at Kumbakonam. Vikram worked on his body for the film, sporting a thick waist to show notable differences from his other police film, Dhill and also put on 8 kilograms (18 lb).

== Soundtrack ==
The soundtrack album and background score were composed by Harris Jayaraj. The song "Kalyanam Thaan" brought recognition to its lyricist Snehan, but received criticism from women's lib organisations for the lyrics "Thaaliya thaan kattikitu petthukalaama, illai pullakutti pethukkittu kattikkalaama?" (Shall we have kids after getting married or shall we have the kids first and then get married?).

Tamil track list

No.	Title	Lyrics	Singer(s)	Length
1.	"Thirunelveli Halwada"	Na. Muthukumar	Palakkad Sreeram	04:36
2.	"Idhuthaanaa"	Thamarai	K. S. Chithra	05:19
3.	"Kalyaanam Thaan Kattikittu"	Snehan	KK, Yugendran, Srilekha Parthasarathy	05:02
4.	"Pudichirukku"	Na. Muthukumar	Hariharan, Komal Ramesh, Mahathi	05:03
5.	"Veppamaram"	Na. Muthukumar	Tippu	05:27
Total length:				25:27

Telugu track list

All lyrics are written by A. M. Rathnam & Siva Ganesh.

No.	Title	Singer(s)	Length
1.	"Thapeswaram Kajaaraa"	Naveen	5:21
2.	"Ayyayyo Ayyayyo"	Koushik, Shravya, Komal Ramesh	5:04
3.	"Yedalona Yedalona"	Harini	5:25
4.	"Pelli Pelli"	Tippu, Srilekha Parthasarathy	4:34
5.	"Vepachettu"	Tippu	05:29
Total length:			25:53

== Release ==
=== Critical reception ===
Sify wrote "The patchy storyline merely serves as a pretext to spark off several skirmishes and bombastic dialogues. Director Hari packs in a sting, but Saamy is strictly for the no holds barred action addicts." Malathi Rangarajan of The Hindu wrote "Flaws there are — but when the maker has a finger on the pulse of the audience little else matters." Visual Dasan of Kalki panned Vikram's characterisation as misguiding society, while calling the film being riveting till the end. Cinesouth wrote "Too much of fights and a stale story makes this film only lukewarm-ish. It gives an impression of a mediocre film".

=== Box office ===
Saamy was released approximately in 100 screens in Tamil Nadu. The film had a huge opening as it was a summer vacation for the Tamil audiences. Theatres in Chennai had almost 100% occupancies and the film recovered all its budget within 4 to 5 days.

== Remakes ==
The film was remade in Telugu as Lakshmi Narasimha (2004), and in Hindi as Policegiri (2013). Some of the plot details were also used in the Kannada film Ayya (2005).

== Sequel ==
A sequel titled Saamy Square was released in 2018, again directed by Hari and starring Vikram.
