= Veppankulam =

Veppankulam VPM
- village
- Country: India
- State: Tamil Nadu
- District: Thanjavur
- Taluk: Pattukkottai

Government
  - Panchayat President: ramathash

Population (2001)
  - Total: 1,474

Languages
  - Official: Tamil
- Time zone: UTC+5:30 (IST)
- Postal code: 614906

Veppankulam is a village in the Pattukkottai taluk of Thanjavur district, Tamil Nadu, India.

== Demographics ==
The dominant community of the martial race is a village inhabited by a large number of warrior group Thevar Community people, who are also collectively known as Mukkulathor or Thevar people. As per the 2001 census, Veppankulam had a total population of 1474 with 679 males and 795 females. The sex ratio was 1.171. The literacy rate was 84.89. Veppankulam Coconut Research Station is the largest in the state, having 97 acres (390,000 m^{2}) of land with coconut varieties ECT, WCT, Yellow, Green, Jafna, etc., VHC1 & VHC2 are the new varieties cross-produced by a team of professors in this station. VHC stands for Veppankulam Hybrid Coconut. This station is coconut research arm of Tamil Nadu Agricultural University, Coimbatore.

Mariyamman Temple, located in south of this village is a famous temple in surrounding area. This temple is further beautified by a small pond called Poongulam.
