= Priyan =

Indian cinematographer (1964–2017)

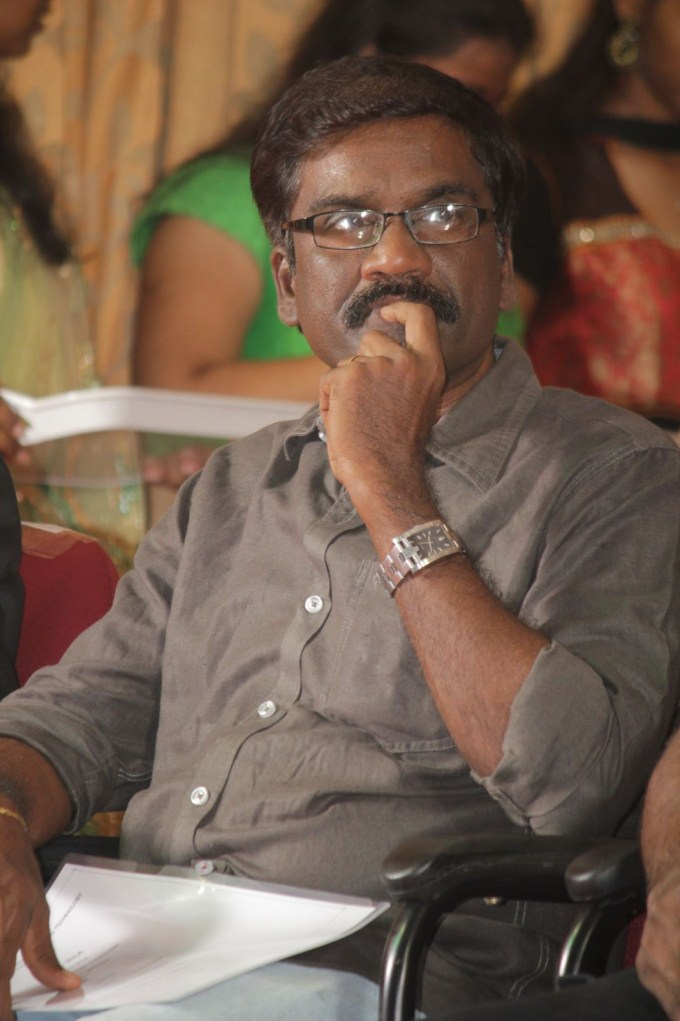
- Born: Nagendran; 1964; Virudhunagar, Tamil Nadu, India
- Died: 9 November 2017 (aged 53); Chennai, Tamil Nadu, India
- Other name: Priyan
- Occupation: cinematographer

Priyan (1964 – 9 November 2017) was an Indian cinematographer who worked on Tamil language films. Beginning his career as an assistant to Balu Mahendra, Priyan began working as an independent technician in the 1990s before establishing himself as a leading cinematographer in the Tamil film industry in the 2000s. He is notable in his work with Director Hari. He died due to a heart attack at his home.

== Career ==
Priyan was born and raised in Virudhunagar, Tamil Nadu. While he was doing an industrial course in polytechnics, Priyan spent his time with his uncle Ganesan during a summer vacation in Chennai. Having noticed his interest in cinema, his uncle introduced him to his friend K. Balaji, an actor-producer in the Tamil film industry. Priyan subsequently started working in K. Balaji's camera unit and worked for the production house, Sujatha International, for five years as an assistant cinematographer.

Through his work, he was introduced to cinematographer-director Balu Mahendra and worked with him on films including Moondram Pirai (1982), Olangal (1982), Sadma (1983) and Yathra (1984). Moreover, he worked in the cinematography teams of films including Mani Ratnam's Pagal Nilavu (1985) and Nayakan (1987). Priyan then worked in productions by Rajiv Menon and Suresh Menon, collaborating with them for serials and commercials.

Priyan made his debut as an independent cinematographer with K. S. Adhiyaman's Thotta Chinungi (1995), before regularly associating with director Cheran in films including Porkkaalam (1997), Desiya Geetham (1998) and Vetri Kodi Kattu (1999). During the turn of the millennium, Priyan got the opportunity to work on high-profile projects including K. S. Ravikumar's Kamal Haasan-starrer Thenali (2000), Star (2001) and Majunu (2001). Thereafter he has regularly collaborated in films with Hari and has worked on 13 movies barring Venghai (2011), where Priyan was busy working on Velayudham (2011).

== Filmography ==
Year	Title	Notes
1992	Vaa Vaa Vasanthame	
1995	Thotta Chinungi	
1997	Porkaalam	
1998	Desiya Geetham	
1999	Anantha Poongatre	
2000	Vetri Kodi Kattu	
2000	Thenali	
2001	Star	
2001	Majunu	
2002	Thamizh	
2002	Bala	
2003	Saamy	
2004	Kovil	
2004	Arul	
2004	Udhaya	
2005	Ayya	
2005	Aaru	
2006	Vallavan	
2006	Thimiru	
2006	Varalaru	
2007	Thaamirabharani	
2007	Vel	
2008	Seval	
2009	Thoranai	
2010	Singam	
2011	Velayutham	
2013	Singam II	
2014	Poojai	
2017	Singam III	
2018	Saamy 2	
