= V. T. Vijayan =

Indian film editor

V. T. Vijayan is an Indian film editor who works in Malayalam, Telugu, and Tamil language films. He started his career as an apprentice to Panju of director duo Krishnan-Panju. He has collaborated in the past with editors including B. Lenin, N. Ganesh Kumar and T. S. Jay. Along with Lenin, Vijayan won the 1994 National Film Award for Best Editing.

== Selected filmography ==
Year	Film	Language	Notes
1984	Kai Kodukkum Kai	Tamil	
1984	Sahasame Jeevitham	Tamil	
1985	Alai Osai	Tamil	
1986	Mouna Ragam	Tamil	
1987	Nayakan	Tamil	
1988	Agni Natchathiram	Tamil	
1988	Andru Peytha Mazhaiyil	Tamil	
1988	Daisy	Malayalam	
1988	August 15 Raatri	Telugu	
1989	Geethanjali	Telugu	
1989	Rajadhi Raja	Tamil	
1989	Ulsavapittennu	Malayalam	
1989	Jaathakam	Malayalam	
1989	Sakshi	Telugu	
1989	Police Report	Telugu	
1989	Apoorva Sagodharargal	Tamil	
1989	Vetri Vizha	Tamil	
1990	Thazhvaram	Malayalam	
1990	Anjali	Tamil	
1991	Chaitanya	Telugu	
1991	Gunaa	Tamil	
1991	Kumbakarai Thangaiah	Tamil	
1991	Vasanthakala Paravai	Tamil	
1992	Nakshthrakoodaram	Malayalam	
1992	Knock Out	Tamil	
1992	Ele, My Friend	English	
1992	Singaravelan	Tamil	
1992	Suriyan	Tamil	
1993	Gentleman	Tamil	
1993	Padheyam	Malayalam	
1993	Venkalam	Malayalam	
1993	Sopanam	Malayalam	
1993	Paithrukam	Malayalam	
1993	Oru Kadankatha Pole	Malayalam	
1993	Chamayam	Malayalam	
1993	I Love India	Tamil	
1994	May Madham	Tamil	
1994	Kaadhalan	Tamil	National Film Award for Best Editing (shared with B. Lenin); Tamil Nadu State Film Award for Best Editor
1995	High Way	Malayalam	
1995	Aasai	Tamil	
1996	Indian	Tamil	
1996	Man of the Match	Malayalam	
1996	Kadhal Desam	Tamil	
1997	Ratchagan	Tamil	Dinakaran Award for Best Editor
1997	Desadanam	Malayalam	
1997	Raasi	Tamil	
1997	Sakthi	Tamil	
1997	Nerrukku Ner	Tamil	
1997	Kulam	Malayalam	
1998	Velai	Tamil	
1998	Kalyana Galatta	Tamil	
1998	Aval Varuvala	Tamil	
1998	Kaadhale Nimmadhi	Tamil	
1998	Jeans	Tamil	
1998	Swami Vivekananda	English	
1999	En Swasa Katre	Tamil	
1999	Mudhalvan	Tamil	
1999	Anantha Poongatre	Tamil	
1999	Vaalee	Tamil	
2000	Kushi	Tamil	
2000	Pandavas: The Five Warriors	English	
2001	Nayak: The Real Hero	Tamil	
2001	Manadhai Thirudivittai	Tamil	
2001	Friends	Tamil	
2001	Dhill	Tamil	
2001	12B	Tamil	
2002	Junior Senior	Tamil	
2002	Thamizh	Tamil	
2002	Samurai	Tamil	
2002	Bala	Tamil	
2002	Thamizhan	Tamil	
2002	Baba	Tamil	
2002	Youth	Tamil	
2002	Bagavathi	Tamil	
2002	Album	Tamil	
2003	Vaseegara	Tamil	Supervising editor
2003	Saamy	Tamil	
2003	Alaudin	Tamil	
2003	Kaadhal Kondein	Tamil	
2003	Pudhiya Geethai	Tamil	
2003	Boys	Tamil	
2003	Iyarkai	Tamil	Supervising editor
2003	Dhool	Tamil	
2004	Kovil	Tamil	
2004	Gambeeram	Tamil	
2004	Samba	Telugu	
2004	Arul	Tamil	
2004	Kamaraj	Tamil	
2004	Ghilli	Tamil	
2004	Kuthu	Tamil	
2004	Chellame	Tamil	
2005	Sachein	Tamil	
2005	Kana Kandaen	Tamil	
2005	Ullam Ketkumae	Tamil	
2005	Anniyan	Tamil	
2005	Ayya	Tamil	
2005	Majaa	Tamil	
2005	Aaru	Tamil	
2005	Sandai Kozhi	Tamil	
2006	Thiruttu Payale	Tamil	
2006	Bangaram	Telugu	
2006	Thimiru	Tamil	
2006	Sasanam	Tamil	
2006	E	Tamil	Supervising editor
2007	Koodal Nagar	Tamil	
2007	Aalwar	Tamil	
2007	Thaamirabharani	Tamil	
2007	Polladhavan	Tamil	
2007	Vel	Tamil	
2007	Unnale Unnale	Tamil	
2008	Dhaam Dhoom	Tamil	
2008	Jayam Kondaan	Tamil	
2008	Seval	Tamil	
2008	Kuruvi	Tamil	
2008	Aegan	Tamil	
2008	Malai Malai	Tamil	
2009	Prayanam	Telugu	
2009	Peraanmai	Tamil	Supervising editor
2009	Vettaikaran	Tamil	
2010	Singam	Tamil	
2010	Maanja Velu	Tamil	
2010	Komaram Puli	Telugu	
2010	Chikku Bukku	Tamil	
2010	Ilaignan	Tamil	
2011	Siruthai	Tamil	
2011	Venghai	Tamil	
2011	Vanthaan Vendraan	Tamil	
2011	Appavi	Tamil	
2011	Vedi	Tamil	
2011	Velayudham	Tamil	
2011	Osthe	Tamil	
2012	Mudhalvar Mahatma	Tamil	
2013	Singam 2	Tamil	
2013	Summa Nachunu Irukku	Tamil	
2013	Ragalaipuram	Tamil	
2014	Boologam	Tamil	
2014	Enna Satham Indha Neram	Tamil	
2014	Vaaraayo Vennilaave	Tamil	
2014	Poojai	Tamil	
2014	Sandamarutham	Tamil	
2015	Killadi	Tamil	
2015	Vai Raja Vai	Tamil	
2015	Bhooloham	Tamil	Editing supervisor
2016	Thirunaal	Tamil	
2016	Kallattam	Tamil	
2017	Singam 3	Tamil	
2017	Indrajith	Tamil	
2017	Karuppan	Tamil	
2018	Saamy 2	Tamil	
2021	Iruvar Ullam	Tamil	
