= Snehan =

Tamil poet and politician (born 1978)

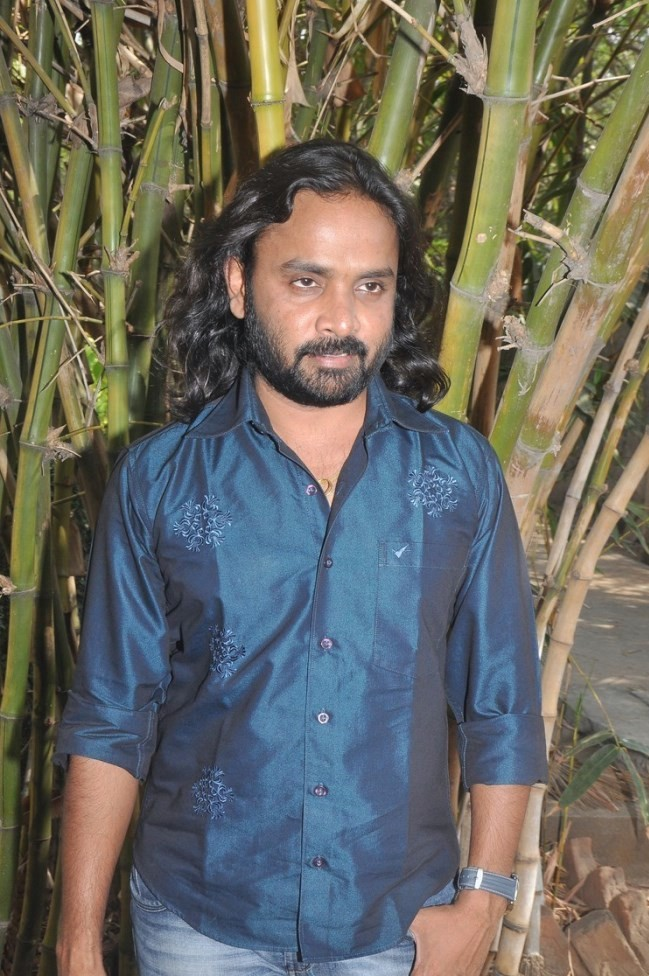

1st Executive committee member of MNM
- Incumbent
- Assumed office 2018
- President: Kamal Haasan
- Preceded by: Position established

Personal details
- Born: Sivaselvam; 23 June 1978 (age 48) Pudhukariyapatti, Tamil Nadu, India
- Party: Makkal Needhi Maiam
- Spouse: Kannika Ravi
- Children: 2
- Occupation: Tamil Poet, Tamil lyricist, Tamil actor, Tamil playback singer, Tamil politician
- Website: Official website

Snehan (born Sivaselvam) is an Indian poet, politician, lyricist, and actor who has worked in the Tamil film industry. He is the 1st executive committee member of Makkal Needhi Maiam party. In the year 2018 he entered politics with Makkal Needhi Maiam and contested in the Lok Sabha election. In 2021 Tamil Nadu Legislative Assembly election, he contested on behalf of Makkal Needhi Maiam as a candidate for Virugambakkam Constituency. Born as the eighth son in a farmer family with 6 elder brothers and 1 elder sister, Snehan, a qualified Intermediate teacher, started to write songs in the year 2000. After serving as an assistant to poet Vairamuthu, he began working as a lyricist in the film Putham Pudhiya Poove and has written lyrics for more than 2500 songs and has worked in more than 750 films. Snehan has since also appeared in films as an actor and made his acting debut with Yogi (2009).

== Early life ==
Sivaselvam was born on 23 June 1978, the youngest of 8 sons into a family to Sivasangu Kodumburar, who were agriculturalist based in the village of Pudukariyapatti, near Sengipatti in the Thanjavur district of Tamil Nadu in a Kallar (Thevar) family. He later changed his name to Snehan, because it translates literally to "man of love"

== Cinema career ==
Moving to Chennai, Snehan first worked as a protégé to noted poet and lyricist Vairamuthu for five years. Later, he worked as the editor of Ilanthendral, a monthly magazine for three years. At the book release function of his works Mudhal Adhyayam and Innum Pengal Azhaga Irukkirargal in 1995, he was asked by K. Balachander to write songs in films and he got the chance from music director S. A. Rajkumar to write lyrics for the film Putham Puthu Poove, which eventually did not have a theatrical release. He has since written more than 2500 songs for more than 500 films, working with various directors and music composers in the Tamil film industry. He first garnered acclaim for his songs in the art film Penngal (2000) and the dubbed film Kandein Seethaiyai (2001), before making a breakthrough with his song "Avaravar Vazhkaiyil" from Cheran's family drama Pandavar Bhoomi (2001). Other successful early songs written by Snehan were from the album Dhaya and the dance number "Chumma Chumma" in Charlie Chaplin (2002) which was picturised on Prabhu Deva and Gayathri Raghuram. He received further acclaim in the early 2000s with his collaboration with Ameer and Yuvan Shankar Raja in Mounam Pesiyadhe (2002) and then for the "Kalyanamdhaan Kattikittu" song in Harris Jayaraj's album Saamy (2003). His work in Ameer's Raam (2005) also won critical acclaim, with the song "Aarariro" earning him plaudits. He later released more books including Ippadium Irukkalam and Puthagam.

He then turned actor for the film action drama Yogi, for which he has also written all the lyrics, as his friend and lead actor of the film, Ameer Sultan, gave him the opportunity. For the same film, Snehan became a playback singer as well, lending his vocals to a song. Portraying a rustic character named Sadayan, the character was well received by audiences. Following his appearance in Yogi, Snehan chose to pursue a career as an actor and looked for roles where he would play the protagonist. In order to prepare for his stint as an actor, he trained under stunt choreographer Power Pandian to practise action scenes and learnt salsa dancing. His next release, the crime thriller Uyarthiru 420 (2011), saw him appear in the lead role in which his voice was dubbed by Sanjeev opposite Meghana Raj but the film fared poorly at the box office and received negative reviews. In regard to his performance, a critic from Sify wrote, "the chemistry between the lead pair is zero" and added, "though Snehan attempts and succeeds to be stylish in the songs, his wooden face, long hair, patchy makeup and dark glasses in almost every frame is a big let down".

In 2013, Snehan began working on a historical film titled Raja Raja Chozhanin Porval directed by R. S. Amudheswar, which would feature music by Ilaiyaraaja. The team began shoot in mid-2013 and planned to bring in actresses Shriya Saran, Sneha and newcomer Naatiya to play leading female roles opposite Snekan. However, the film was subsequently shelved after it ran into financial trouble. In 2015, he then started work on a film titled Bommi Veeran directed by Ramesh Maharajan, where he would portray a kattaikkuttu dancer. Like his previous film, the film ran intro financial trouble and the shoot remains on hold.

In 2017, Snehan took part in the Tamil reality television show Bigg Boss hosted by Kamal Haasan and finished as the runner-up. During the show, Snehan announced a proposal to build a library in interior Tamil Nadu with the prize money, if the audience were to vote for him to win the show. Despite his failure to win the show, he began work on the library in Tanjore during November 2017. He later announced that he would appear in the lead role in a film titled Panangkaattu Nari opposite his fellow Bigg Boss contestant, Oviya, but the project did not develop.

Later in 2022, he returned as a contestant in Bigg Boss Ultimate (season 1) which is one of the Ultimate series of Bigg Boss Tamil.

== Political career ==
On 21 February 2018, during the launch of Kamal Haasan's political party Makkal Needhi Maiam (MNM) at the Othakadai Grounds in Madurai, Snehan officially joined the party and became the party's executive committee member. Snehan made his speech and said, "The crowd in front of me has gathered only for the love of Kamal Haasan. This is the real, Thaanaa Serndha Koottam. Kamal sir, will be the best friend for every citizen in the State. Yaadhum Oorey, Yaavarum Keleer. Let us spread love to all with the fullest happiness". Snehan wrote the lyrics of the party's anthem "Idhu Nammavar Padai". At the 2019 Indian general election in Tamil Nadu, he contested from Sivaganga as a candidate of the Makkal Needhi Maiam.

In 2021 Tamil Nadu Legislative Assembly election, he is contesting on behalf of Makkal Needhi Maiam as a candidate for Virugambakkam Constituency

=== Indian general elections (Lok Sabha) ===
Snehan electoral performances in the Indian general elections (Lok Sabha).

Year	Election	Party	PC Name	Result	Votes gained	Vote %
2019	17th Lok Sabha	Makkal Needhi Maiam	Sivaganga	5th place	22,951	2.1

== Works ==
=== Selected filmography ===
==== As lyricist ====
- Putham Puthu Poove (1997)
- Manu Needhi (2000)
- Pandavar Bhoomi (2001)
- Kottai Mariamman (2001)
- Thamizh (2002)
- Enge Enadhu Kavithai (2002)
- Charlie Chaplin (2002)
- Mounam Pesiyadhe (2002)
- April Maadhathil (2002)
- Bagavathi (2002)
- Chokka Thangam (2003)
- Kadhal Sugamanathu (2003)
- Saamy (2003)
- Success (2003)
- Kadhal Kirukkan (2003)
- Thathi Thavadhu Manasu (2003)
- Kovil (2004)
- Autograph (2004)
- Adi Thadi (2004)
- Jana (2004)
- Perazhagan (2004)
- Kadhal Dot Com (2004)
- Kuthu (2004)
- Sound Party (2004)
- Manmadhan (2004)
- Raam (2005)
- Vanakkam Thalaiva (2005)
- Paruthiveeran (2007)
- Aegan (2008)
- Padikathavan (2009)
- Mappillai (2011)
- Sura (2010)
- Aadukalam (2011)
- Kadhal 2 Kalyanam (2011)
- Kazhugu (2012)
- Sandiyar (2014)
- Soorarai Pottru (2020)
- Udanpirappe (2021)
- Anandham Vilayadum Veedu (2021)
- Yaanai (2022)
- The Legend (2022)
- Coffee with Kadhal (2022)
- Pathu Thala (2023)
- Garudan (2024)
- Thiru.Manickam (2024)

Television

- 2008 Deepangal
- 2008 Thekkathi Ponnu
- 2010 Ilavarasi
- 2011 Appanum Aathalum
- 2012 My Name is Mangamma
- 2014 Uyirmei

Songs

- "Avaravar Vaazhkkaiyil Aayiram Aayiram Maatrangal" (Pandavar Boomi)
- "Thozha Thozha" (Pandavar Boomi)
- "Adatha Aattamellam" (Mounam Pesiyathe)
- "Kalyanam Thaan Kattikittu Odipolama" (Saamy)
- "Poi Solla Intha Manasukku Theriyavillai" (April Maadhathil)
- "Gnabagam Varuthe" (Autograph)
- "Manasukkulle Dhaagam Vanthucha" (Autograph)
- "Ore Oru Piravi" (Perazhagan)
- "Manmadhane Nee" (Manmadhan)
- "Boom Boom" (Raam)
- "Aarariraro" (Raam)
- "Ore Oru Oorukkulle Ore Oru Appa Amma" (Thavamai Thavamirunthu)
- "Ariyadha Vayasu" (Paruthiveeran)
- "Ayyayyo" (Paruthiveeran)
- "Oororam Puliyamaram" (Paruthiveeran)
- "Appa Amma Vilayattu" (Padikkathavan)
- "Maambalamaam Maambalam" (Pokkiri)
- "Hey Salaa" (Aegan)
- "Odum Varaiyil" (Aegan)
- "Deemthanakka Thillaanaa" (Villu)
- "Yaarodu Yaro" (Yogi)
- "Meendum Pallikku Pogalam" (Pallikkoodam)
- "Yathe Yathe" (Aadukalam)
- "Ayyayo Nenju" (Aadukalam)
- "Ambalaikkum Pombalaikkum" (Kazhugu)
- "Kaatu Payale" (Soorarai Pottru)
- "Karambakudi Kanaga" (Udanpirappe)
- "Yelamma Yela" (Yaanai)
- "Sandaaliye" (Yaanai)
- "Yelamma Yela-Version 2" (Yaanai)
- "Thala Keezha" (Coffee with Kadhal)
- "Raawadi" (Pathu Thala)
- "Kombu Vecha" (Garudan)
- "Panjavarna Kiliye" (Garudan)
- "Aeroplanil Yeri" (Garudan)

==== As actor ====
- Yogi (2009)
- Vandae Maatharam (2010; Tamil-Malayalam bilingual film; Special appearance in the song "Gala Gala Gala Gaaley")
- Uyarthiru 420 (2011)
- Comali (2019)
- Bhoomi (2021; Hotstar release)
- Anandham Vilayadum Veedu (2021)
- Yaanai (2022)
- Nirangal Moondru (2024)
- Paruthi (2025)

Television

- Bigg Boss Tamil 1 as contestant (Finalist)
- Bigg Boss Tamil 2 as special guest
- Bharathi Kannamma as special guest
- Bigg Boss Ultimate (season 1) as contestant (Evicted day 42)
- Pavithra (2024)

=== Books ===
- Mudhal Adhyayam
- Innum Pengal Azhaga Irukkirargal
- Ippadium Irukkalam
- Puththagam
- Avaravar Vazhkaiyil
