= Thamizh =

- Poster
- Directed by: Hari
- Written by: Hari
- Produced by: Amudha Durairaj
- Starring: Prashanth; Simran
- Cinematography: Priyan
- Edited by: V. T. Vijayan
- Music by: Bharadwaj
- Production company: Deivanai Movies
- Distributed by: Deivanai Movies
- Release date: 14 April 2002
- Running time: 155 minutes
- Country: India
- Language: Tamil
- Budget: ₹20 million

Thamizh is a 2002 Indian Tamil-language action drama film directed by Hari, in his directorial debut, and produced by Amudha Durairaj under Deivanai Movies. The film stars Prashanth and Simran. J. Livingston, Vadivelu, Urvashi, Nassar and Ashish Vidyarthi play supporting roles. The music was composed by Bharadwaj, while the cinematography and editing were handled by Priyan and V. T. Vijayan.

Thamizh was released in 14 April 2002. It received positive reviews from critics and became a commercial success.

== Plot ==
Anbazhagan returns home from Kuwait after not seeing his family for three years. He reunites with his wife Kalaichelvi, his mother and his two children. He is waiting for his younger brother Thamizh and asked his mother and Kalaichelvi where he is, yet both of them has avoided the question. Meanwhile, outside there was a riot happening outside their house and their neighbour Moorthy happened to be the victim alongside his pregnant sister. This has been stopped by Thamizh who has beaten up his goons. Anbazhagan realised how changed Thamizh was because he has become more violent. This leads to a flashback of how he became who he is.

Thamizh leads a happy life with his mother and sister-in-law Kalaichelvi. Anbazhagan is working in Kuwait, and he too dreams of joining him there. Meenakshi, their tenant, and Thamizh fall in love. There are two gangs in his area, one led by Periyavar, a geriatric, and Rathnam. During Deepavali, when the goons of Periyavar injure Thamizh's niece, he stops Periyavar's car on the road and questions him. He then beats up one of Periyavar's goons when insulted. This makes him Periyavar's target, and though he tries to withdraw from the violence, he is forced to join forces with Rathnam, Periyavar's sworn enemy, and eventually defeats him.

== Cast ==
- Prashanth as Thamizh
- Simran as Meenakshi
- Vadivelu as Moorthy
- Nassar as Dharmarathnam (Rathnam)
- Livingston as Anbazhagan, Thamizh's brother
- Urvashi as Cumbum Kalaichelvi, Thamizh's sister-in-law
- Manorama as Annapoorani, Thamizh's mother
- Ashish Vidyarthi as Periyavar (Voice dubbed by TNB Kathiravan)
- Delhi Ganesh as Meenakshi's father
- Thalaivasal Vijay as Haneefa
- Charle as Ammavasai
- Ponnambalam as Thangam
- Besant Ravi as Kasi
- Scissor Manohar as Poochi
- Bonda Mani
- Suryakanth
- Minnal Deepa as Jayanthi, Moorthy's sister
- Karnaa Radha
- Bava Lakshmanan
- Alphonsa as dancer in the song "Kadhelenum Jorula"
- K. S. Ravikumar as Inspector Ayyamperumal in a cameo appearance

== Production ==
The film was written by and marked the directional debut of Hari, who earlier worked as an assistant director to K. Balachander. The film's title of Thamizh was given by Tamil Nadu Chief Minister M. Karunanidhi, who also helped create the film's logo for Deivanai Movies. Simran was selected as heroine pairing with lead actor Prashanth, for fourth time after successful collaborations in Kannedhirey Thondrinal (1998), Jodi (1999) and Parthen Rasithen (2000). Mamta Kulkarni was also attached to the project, but eventually did not feature. Director Saran assisted Hari with the dialogues in the film, supervising his writing.

The team had worked on pre-production for close to a year and the script was ready prior to the start of the shoot, with Hari revealing he was inspired by the 1989 Malayalam film Kireedam. For his role, Prashanth worked out at the gym, grew a beard and began smoking cigarettes to get into character. Shooting commenced in Chennai and proceeded in locations like Mumbai, Kolkata and Delhi. Scenes were also shot in Sikkim, reportedly becoming the first time that a Tamil film is shot there. A few scenes were also later picturised on Prashanth, Charlie, Vadivelu, and Crane Manohar in Karaikudi. Prashanth had performed a lengthy dialogue in front of Madurai Meenakshi Temple which gained accolades from the onlookers. Prashanth shot action scenes for the film through pain after he had injured his knee during the making of Majunu (2001).

== Soundtrack ==
The soundtrack was composed by Bharadwaj.

Song	Singer(s)	Lyrics
"Azhagana Oru Nenjam"	Shankar Mahadevan	Snehan
"Kadhelenum Jorula"	Harish Raghavendra, Ganga	Viveka
"Kannukkulle Kadhala"	P. Unnikrishnan, Swarnalatha	Vaali
"Penne Undhan"	Manikka Vinayagam	Snehan
"Rosappoo Udhattu"	Yugendran, Anuradha Sriram	Palani Bharathi
"Thamizh"	Mano	Snehan
"Vikkuthe"	Srinivas, Sujatha	Thamarai

== Release ==
The similarities of title and release date between Thamizh and the Vijay-starrer Thamizhan created confusion with the producers of both films unable to accommodate any changes. Made at a cost of ₹20 million, the film failed to get a distributor before release due to competition from other films, so producer Amudha Durairaj marketed the venture herself. The film was released on 14 April 2002 (Tamil New Year) alongside Thamizhan, Gemini and Raajjiyam.

=== Critical reception ===
A critic from Cinematoday3.itgo.com wrote "When one leaves the theatre, one gets the satisfaction of watching a good film. This feeling has been rare in recent lives. Thamizh has turned out as the thirst quencher". Malathi Rangarajan of The Hindu noted, "Thamizh is backed by a strong storyline and a significant end [sic] and the positive twist is appealing." Malini Mannath of Chennai Online wrote, "Debutant director Hari reveals commendable confidence, in his very first venture, crafting his screenplay intelligently, with well defined characters, engaging incidents & a racy narrative style. In short he has a firm grip on the medium, the script having not many rough edges".

=== Box office ===
The film became a success at the Tamil Nadu box office despite opening with little publicity, with positive word of mouth significantly helping the film's prospects. The film's success established Hari as a popular director in Tamil cinema.
