= Kaaviyyan =

- Theatrical release poster
- Directed by: Sarathi
- Produced by: K. V. Shabarreesh
- Starring: Shaam; Sridevi Kumar; Athmiya Rajan
- Cinematography: N. S. Raajesh Kumar
- Edited by: Arun Thomas AKD
- Music by: Syam Mohan MM
- Production company: 2 m Cinemas
- Distributed by: SDC Picturez
- Release date: 18 October 2019
- Running time: 109 minutes
- Country: India
- Language: Tamil

Kaaviyyan: Challenge To Win is a 2019 Indian road thriller film directed by Sarathi in his directorial debut. The film is based on the Hollywood film The Call (2013) and features Shaam, Sridevi Kumar, Athmiya Rajan, Nahum Vikazis and Srinath play supporting roles. The music was composed by Syam Mohan, and the film released on 18 October 2019 to negative reviews.

== Plot ==
Two cops from the Cyber Crime Department from Chennai, Akilan Vishwanath and Baskar, are sent as trainees to Las Vegas by the police chief. While in Vegas, they work with Isha Thomas, a 9-1-1 dispatcher who receives several calls for help; Batten, the chief police inspector of the Las Vegas Police Department; and Swetha Menon, a Malayali dispatcher from Kozhikode. On one such phone call, Isha gets a call from Jennifer Edward Rubis, who tells her that a man has entered her house. Much to the man's demise, Jennifer is able to escape out of an upstairs window. Akilan and Baskar later figure out that the man who entered Jennifer's house was Lucifer Fernando, a psychopath who murders girls for their blood type (B+) to "purify" his blood. Lucifer is taking a Sri Lankan Tamil woman, Mathangai Kumaravel, hostage. While searching for details about Lucifer, Akilan learns of Kasie, Lucifer's ex-wife who filed a divorce after she learned that he was flirting with another woman. Kasie recorded her phone calls with Lucifer on behalf of her lawyer and hands them to Isha. How Akilan sets out to rescue Mathangai forms the rest of the story.

== Cast ==
- Shaam as Akilan Vishwanath
- Sridevi Kumar as Isha Thomas
- Athmiya Rajan as Mathangai Kumaravel
- Nahum Vizakis as Lucifer Fernando (credited as Justin Vikash)
- Srinath as Baskar
- Lucas Sanders as M. Batten
- Jennifer Brofer as Kasie
- Jennifer Antony as Shwetha
- Vanitha Hariharan as Isha's younger sister
- K. R. Selvaraj as the Indian chief of police
- Murali as Isha's father (uncredited, in portrait)

== Production ==
=== Development ===
The film was announced in May 2016 and was to be produced by 2 m cinemas, making it will be their first venture. Producer K. V. Shabarreesh came on board after seeing director's Sarathi's short films. Stun Siva was signed on to direct the action sequences. This film was originally announced to be a bilingual film in Tamil and Telugu (titled Vaadu Osthaadu), but the Telugu version was dropped. The film was a road thriller and started shooting in the United States. The title Kaaviyyan was revealed to be a portmanteau of ka from kaval thurai (police), and viyyan from viyakkathakkavan (amazing person).

=== Casting ===
Shaam plays the main lead role, marking his comeback into Tamil cinema as a lead actor after 6, which released in 2013. Sridevi Kumar, a Malayali based in Las Vegas, and Athmiya Rajan, who is known for her role in Manam Kothi Paravai, are also doing important roles in this thriller. Srinath, who has acted alongside Shaam in 12B and Ullam Ketkumae is also part of this film. The villain is a Hollywood artist whose name is yet to be revealed was not revealed as of 2016. In 2017, Hollywood actor and bodybuilder Justin Vikash (real name Nahum Vizakis) was reported to play the villain. Hollywood artists Lucas Sanders and Jennifer Brofer were signed to play important roles. Shaam gained a couple of kilograms in order to play his role as a police officer.

=== Filming ===
The film shooting began in August 2016 in Las Vegas. A majority of the film was shot in Las Vegas. The stunt sequences featured fancy cars such as Rolls-Royce and Hummers.

== Soundtrack ==
Kaaviyyan

Soundtrack album by Syam Mohan M.M
- Released: 2018
- Genre: Soundtrack
- Length: 3:23
- Language: Tamil
- Label: Times Music Tamil

Syam Mohan M.M chronology
Kaaviyyan (2018)	Thandagan (TBA)

Debutant Syam Mohan composed two songs for the film.

No.	Title	Lyrics	Singer(s)	Length
1.	"Siru Mazhaithuli"	Pragaa	Vandana Dhivyaraja	3:24
2.	"Ethuvandha Enna"	Mohan Rajan	Ananthu, Dhivakar	3:07
Total length:				6:31

== Release ==
The film was released on October 18, 2019.

=== Critical reception ===
Kaaviyyan released to negative reviews. Thinal Menon of The Times of India gave the film 1 out of 5 stars stating "A sloppy script staged in an artificial set up with hardly any character arc". Ashameera Aiyappan of The New Indian Express gave the film a 1.5 stars out of 5 stars stating that "This Shaam-starrer is a lost case". A critic from Maalai Malar praised the cinematography and criticized the screenplay of the film. A critic from Dinamalar praised the music and cinematography and criticized the film's screenplay.

== See also ==
- List of films set in Las Vegas
