= Vikram Singh (producer) =

Indian film producer

- Occupation: Producer
- Years active: 1993-2003

Vikram Singh is a film producer who works in Tamil and Hindi-language films.

== Career ==
Vikram Singh became associated with producer Boney Kapoor from the making of Roop Ki Rani Choron Ka Raja (1993) and worked as an executive producer for several Hindi and Tamil films including Judaai (1997) and The Terrorist (1997). His final project with Kapoor was when working as an online producer for Hamara Dil Aapke Paas Hai (2000).

Following conversations with an associate, director Priyadarshan, Singh opted to begin work as a producer in Tamil cinema, and debuted with 12B (2001). He produced the film under the studio, Film Works. Debutante Shaam was signed for the lead role after meeting with the director, Jeeva and with him. After the release of 12B, Singh expressed interest in dubbing the film in Telugu. The promotions of 12B garnered acclaim with Shaam gaining film offers before the film's release although the film was a box office failure. After this, Singh went on to work with Shaam and music director Harris Jayaraj again for Priyadarshan's Lesa Lesa (2003). The film was a remake of the successful Malayalam film Summer in Bethlehem (1998). To concentrate on the venture, Singh put the film Acham Thavir starring Madhavan and Jyothika on hold. To avoid piracy, he released the soundtrack of Lesa Lesa at a cheap rate.

== Filmography ==
=== As a producer ===
Year	Title	Language	Notes
2001	12B	Tamil	(Note: The film was produced for Film Works.)
2003	Lesa Lesa	Tamil	

=== Other positions ===
==== As an executive producer ====
Year	Title	Language	Notes
1993	Roop Ki Rani Choron Ka Raja	Hindi	
1996	Loafer	Hindi	
1997	Judaai	Hindi	
1998	The Terrorist	Tamil	

==== As an online producer ====
- Pukar (2000) (Hindi) (US shoot)
- Hamara Dil Aapke Paas Hai (2000) (Hindi)
