= Purampokku Engira Podhuvudamai =

2015 Indian film by S. P. Jananathan

- Theatrical release poster
- Directed by: S. P. Jhananathan
- Screenplay by: Roghanth
- Dialogue by: S. P. Jhananathan
- Story by: S. P. Jhananathan
- Produced by: Siddharth Roy Kapur; S. P. Jananathan
- Starring: Arya; Shaam; Vijay Sethupathi; Karthika
- Cinematography: N. K. Ekambaram
- Edited by: N. Ganesh Kumar
- Music by: Soundtrack: Varshan; Score: Srikanth Deva
- Production companies: Binary Pictures; UTV Motion Pictures
- Distributed by: UTV Motion Pictures
- Release date: 15 May 2015
- Running time: 159 minutes
- Country: India
- Language: Tamil

Purampokku Engira Podhuvudamai (transl. Common land alias public property) is a 2015 Indian Tamil-language political action thriller film directed by S. P. Jhananathan, and produced by Jananathan under Binary Pictures, in association with UTV Motion Pictures. The film stars Arya, Shaam, Vijay Sethupathi and Karthika, in her final film appearance. It revolves around a communist who is sentenced to death, while his comrade seeks his release.

The film was initially announced untitled in 2012 but got stalled and re-announced in 2013 under the title Purampokku. Filming took place between January and December 2014, in Chennai, Himachal Pradesh and Rajasthan. Three months after filming ended, it was retitled. The film features cinematography by N. K. Ekambaram and a score by Srikanth Deva, while the soundtrack was composed by newcomer Varshan. It was released in theatres on 15 May 2015.

== Plot ==
In Delhi, Balusamy, a communist leader who is convicted by court on counts of robbery, murder, and treason, is given the death sentence. Despite Balu's request to execute him as a martyr by shooting, the court orders that he be hanged within a month's time by a professional executioner or hangman. He is escorted to a high security prison complex in Chennai by Macaulay, an honest, law-abiding police officer who is given the charge of monitoring him until his execution. The prison provides freedom to all prisoners, including Balu, to do whatever they want, as long as they do not cause unrest. Balu is instantly admired by the inmates for his patriotism and philosophy, as well as his empathy with the inmates. They view him as a spokesperson to the prison officials on behalf of them.

Meanwhile, Macaulay searches for a hangman and learns of Yamalingam, an executioner who has had a disdain of execution since his teens due to remorse of hanging an innocent man who was wrongly accused. Macaulay tries to convince Yamalingam to carry out the duty of executing Balu, to which he agrees after much coercion by Macaulay that Balu is a convict. Yamalingam is given a special phone tuned to a certain frequency where Macaulay can contact him.

Elsewhere, Kuyili, Balu's trusted comrade, learns about his conviction and assembles a group of computer hackers to hack into the prison's surveillance system. She befriends Yamalingam and uses him as a messenger to convey their escape plan to Balu. Kuyili also explains to Yamalingam that Balu was a communist leader in North India who wanted to prevent India from turning into a landfill site. To justify his actions, Balu took to violence and tried suicide bombing the Indian Army but failed due to Kuyili's reluctance to kill him. He was apprehended and jailed in Delhi. Kuyili tells Yamalingam that her refusal to kill Balu and his past guilt of executing an innocent person were the reasons that made them allies.

Yamalingam becomes impressed by Balu's ideologies and decides to stop Balu from being executed. He requests Macaulay to meet Balu in person, to which he agrees. Yamalingam makes a mannequin based on Balu's likeness to test the rope for hanging, with Balu conveying the escape plan to him, unknown to Macaulay, through a sheet of paper. Soon, with the help of two inmates, Balu escapes from jail in the place of a South African convict, but he surrenders upon seeing the convict being battered by the police. Macaulay and the police beat Balu up and lock him up in a secured prison cell, chained. Kuyili disguises herself as a fiancee of Balu and visits him in prison to convey the escape plan to him in Sanskrit. She later devises a plan with Yamalingam to aid Balu's escape at the execution chamber.

Meanwhile, Macaulay learns that Yamalingam has been in contact with Kuyili but decides to deal with him after Balu's execution. He holds a press conference along with the government officials allotting the date of Balu's execution, but changes plans that night by detaining the officials, including Yamalingam, and seizing their phones until Balu is executed the day before the officially announced date, while enforcing strict security around the prison premises with the help of soldiers. Macaulay goes to Balu's cell and takes him out into the prison ground, where he tells him of his execution date as a prisoner's right to information. He also discusses with Balu on the irony that how he was looked upon as a traitor by the public despite his crusade for the people, to which Balu retorts by saying that the police works for a corrupt government. Macaulay informs Balu that Yamalingam had been in contact with Kuyili and sends a message to Yamalingam's phone as Kuyili to assure him that they know the changed date of the execution. He tells Balu that no one would come to save him but asks if he was valiant enough to give up his life as a martyr, to which Balu replies that he see it for himself at the execution chamber.

On the day of his execution, Balu delivers a speech saying that Indian people have the rights to their own land and they should not allow foreign countries to abuse it. Yamalingam looks at Balu's eyes and winks at him, assuring him that he shall escape, covers his face and places the noose on him, then proceeds to hang him, being tensed after the process. Unbeknownst to Yamalingam, Kuyili had not been informed of the execution. When Balu's body is retrieved from the trapdoor, Yamalingam becomes remorseful and demands the officials that he keep the body, but to no avail. Balu's body is cremated at the prison complex by Macaulay and the police. Yamalingam mentally breaks down, out of guilt of executing Balu, and carries the mannequin he made earlier and sees it as Balu himself. Kuyili, upon hearing Balu's execution, leaves India with her comrades on a boat. Some years later, Yamalingam, now a psychologically retarded beggar, converses with Balu's mannequin on a railway track and tells it the impact of Balu's ideology on the public, then salutes it as the film ends.

== Cast ==
- Arya as Balusamy
- Shaam as T. Macaulay IPS
- Vijay Sethupathi as Yamalingam
- Karthika as Kuyili
- Rama as Yamalingam's mother
- Krishnamoorthy as Chellakunjan
- Bharathi Murugesh as Vedigundu
- Naveen as Naathampidichavan
- Sri Vetri as Vetri
- TSK as Saravanakumar
- Vishwa as Vishwa
- Yaar Kannan as himself
- Annadurai Kannadasan as himself
- Udayabhanu as Prisoner

== Production ==
=== Development ===
Three years after his last directorial Peraanmai (2009), S. P. Jananathan announced that his next directorial would feature Jiiva and Ravi Mohan, who both starred in Jananathan's earlier films, in the lead roles. However, the project failed to take off. In August 2013, Jananathan announced the revived project titled Purampokku with Arya and Vijay Sethupathi as the new leads. The film was jointly produced by UTV Motion Pictures and Jananathan's Binary Pictures. Cinematography was handled by N. K. Ekambaram, and editing by N. Ganesh Kumar.

Jananathan stated that the film's script was inspired by protests and opposition over the sentencing of the 26 accused in the assassination of Rajiv Gandhi to life imprisonment, changed from death sentence; and the lack of protests over the execution of serial killer Auto Shankar and convicted rapist Dhananjoy Chatterjee. He also said it questions the relevance of capital punishment in a democratic society, and the lack of official records of the actual number of people sent to gallows in India inspired him to write the film. Aware that the term "purampokku" is often used derogatorily, Jananathan stated that the film's title refers to the term's root meaning of common land not exclusive to anyone: "Our ancestors have left more than 15 types of purampokku lands for us, and they are used illegally by people with power. The film will deal with one such purampokku land".

=== Casting ===
Jananathan stated that while Jiiva and Ravi were originally cast as the leads, he ultimately decided to replace them for freshness; Arya replaced Ravi and Sethupathi replaced Jiiva. Karthika was signed as the lead actress, and this became her last performance before her retirement from films. The name of Karthika's character, Kuyili, is a reference to the Indian freedom fighter of the same name. Shaam, who earlier appeared in Jananathan's directorial debut Iyarkai (2003) and appeared alongside Arya in Ullam Ketkumae (2005), was selected to play a police officer.

Jananathan said he cast Karthika because he wanted an actress who was "tough" and could speak Tamil, unlike contemporary Tamil film actresses; and Arya, who he felt had been typecast as a "lover boy", to break this stereotype. Shaam shaved his moustache for the role at Jananathan's request; he was initially reluctant as police officers in Tamil Nadu are known for their moustaches, but agreed after the director wanted to depict a police officer unlike what contemporaneous Tamil films had depicted.

=== Filming ===
Principal photography began on 11 January 2014 in Kulu Manali, Himachal Pradesh. The film was shot extensively around Himachal Pradesh, Rajasthan and Chennai. When filming an emotional scene involving Shaam and Sethupathi, Jananathan shot the scene in a unique way such that he allowed the actors to enact the entire sequence at one stretch. Though it was tough to shoot, the method ensured that the improvisations the actors had in mind were implemented on the spot. Later, the director broke the sequence into shots and got exactly what he wanted and made the actors enact certain portions again. Karthika had to learn to ride a camel for a few scenes shot in Jaisalmer, Rajasthan.

Arya had to perform the risky stunt of running on top of a moving train in an important sequence in the film. A huge prison set was erected in Chennai where an extensive 45-day production schedule was shot with the lead actors of the film. On 4 August 2014, filming was temporarily cancelled by the production unit, who joined the protest declared by the Tamil Nadu Film Director's union against the Government of Sri Lanka's army for writing articles on their official website degrading the then Chief Minister of Tamil Nadu, J. Jayalalithaa. Principal photography wrapped on 17 December 2014.

=== Title dispute ===
In August 2013, Natty Subramaniam claimed that he had already registered the title Purampokku for a future film, and claiming that he did not give anyone permission to use the title, threatened to take legal action against anyone who did so. In November 2013, UTV released a press statement that the title Purampokku would be retained for Jananathan's film as confirmed by the South Indian Film Chamber, Tamil Film Producers Council and the Film and Television Producers's Guild. However, by April 2015, the film was retitled Purampokku Engira Podhuvudamai, with Jananathan saying the new title was meant to better emphasise "the forgotten fact that everything is common for all".

== Music ==
The songs are composed by debutant Varshan, (Note: This film marked the debut of Varshan, after his previous film Vellai Kagitham failed to have a theatrical release even though the songs were released.) while the background score was composed by Srikanth Deva. One of the songs, which reflects prison life, was written by Parinamam, a poet who once spent 60 days in a Madurai prison. He wrote the song using his experiences in jail. Karthik of Milliblog wrote, "The entire soundtrack of Purampokku sounds like it was composed back in 1999 and has somehow stumbled out of cold storage".

Track listing
| No. | Title | Lyrics | Singer(s) | Length |
|---|---|---|---|---|
| 1. | "Marina Beachula" | Parinamam | Diwakar, Mukesh Mohamed | 4:11 |
| 2. | "Kalaasi Kalaasi" | Vijaya Sagar | M. L. R. Karthikeyan, Malathy Lakshman, Tirukumar Thiagarajah, Diwakar | 5:02 |
| 3. | "Orea Oru Murai" | Na. Muthukumar | Vijay Prakash, Sunitha Sarathy, Ranjana | 4:48 |
| 4. | "Dhaegam Thaakkum" | Eknaath | K. Krishna Kumar, Ramya NSK | 1:58 |
| 5. | "Aaja O Re" | Munnah | Abhay Jodhpurkar, Amirthavarshini, Haritha | 1:13 |
| Total length: | | | | 17:12 |

== Marketing and release ==
The teaser of Purampokku Engira Podhuvudamai was released on 15 August 2014, India's Independence Day. Jananathan intentionally chose this date as he felt it was relevant to the film. The makers initially aimed to release the film in January 2015. The film was eventually released on 15 May 2015, delayed by two weeks. UTV Motion Pictures released the film in theatres worldwide.

=== Critical reception ===
Udhav Naig from The Hindu wrote, "The greatness of Purampokku lies not in the fact that it takes complex issues such as death penalty and privatisation to create a superb, entertaining film. On the contrary, Purampokku provides a blue print – evidence, if you like – for filmmakers to show how one can deal with controversial topics without watering down the complexity of the issue or settling for a silly compromise". M Suganth from The Times of India gave the film 3 stars out of 5 and wrote, "Jhananthan takes his own sweet time to get to the crux of the story, spending too much time on songs and establishing the grandness of the prison set, but once the plot gets moving, Purampokku is completely engaging. That the director manages to make it a solid political commentary and also an effective thriller at once is an accomplishment".

Malini Mannath from The New Indian Express wrote, "Informative and entertaining, Purampokku... is one film where the characters and moments linger in the mind, even after one leaves the theatre". S Saraswathi from Rediff.com gave the film 3 stars out of 5 and wrote, "Purampokku Engira Podhuvudamai is an honest and compelling political thriller that debates the arbitrary nature of capital punishment against the backdrop of a communist revolution". A critic from Sify wrote, "SP Jananathan's dialogues are splendid, he casually spill all his communism ideologies in every possible scenes but as the concept of the film itself is universal, the execution should have been top notch and flawless but here things are progressively poor and amateurish". A critic from Hindu Tamil Thisai lauded the cast performances, screenplay and realistic art direction, but felt the film should have better protested against capital punishment. A critic from Cinema Vikatan praised the cast performances, the cinematography and art direction.

=== Box office ===
Purampokku Engira Podhuvudamai opened at first place at the Chennai box office. However, during the second week of its release, it dropped to fourth.
