= Asthram =

Asthram may refer to:

- Asthram (1983 film), an Indian Malayalam-language film
- Asthram (2025 film), an Indian Tamil-language crime thriller film
