= Laabam =

- Theatrical release poster
- Directed by: S. P. Jananathan
- Screenplay by: Aalayamani
- Story by: S. P. Jananathan
- Dialogues by: S. P. Jananathan
- Produced by: P. Arumuga Kumar; Vijay Sethupathi
- Starring: Vijay Sethupathi; Shruti Haasan; Jagapathi Babu; Dhansika
- Cinematography: Ramji
- Edited by: N. Ganesh Kumar; S. P. Ahmed
- Music by: D. Imman
- Production companies: Vijay Sethupathhi Productions; 7Cs Entertainment Pvt Ltd
- Release date: 9 September 2021
- Country: India
- Language: Tamil

Laabam (transl. Profit) is a 2021 Indian Tamil-language action drama film directed and co-written by S. P. Jananathan. It stars Vijay Sethupathi and Shruti Haasan, with Jagapathi Babu, Dhansika, and Kalaiyarasan in pivotal roles.

Filming for Laabam took place between April 2019 and December 2020. Ramji was hired as cinematographer, while D. Imman is the music composer. The film was released theatrically on 9 September 2021. It was Jananathan's final film as he died six months before its release.

== Plot ==
Pakkiri returns to his native place after an exile and straight away takes on the greedy village head Vanagamudi. With the support of the locals, he becomes the president of the village and decides to give agriculture a new touch with his techniques. The rest of the story is about how Pakkiri manages the local goons with the help of Clara and comes out victorious.

== Cast ==
- Vijay Sethupathi as Pakkiri Samy
- Shruti Haasan as Clara
- Jagapathi Babu as Vanangamudi
- Dhansika as Vanangamudi's assistant
- Kalaiyarasan as Benny
- Ramesh Thilak as Tesla (Pakkiri's friend)
- Daniel Annie Pope as Pakkiri's friend
- Nitish Veera as Pakkiri's friend
- Jai Varman as Pakkiri's friend
- Prithvi Rajan as Selvaraj
- G. Marimuthu as Paraman
- Vincent Asokan
- Shanmugarajan
- O. A. K. Sundar
- Praveena as Vanangamudi's wife
- KPY Bala as Tabla player
- Sanika Raghawa as Clara's friend
- Nikitha Murali as Meenakshi
- Nagendra Prasad in the song "Yaamili Yaamiliyaa"

== Production ==
The film is directed by S. P. Jananathan, who made a comeback into direction after Purampokku Engira Podhuvudamai, (2015). Principal photography for Laabam commenced on 22 April 2019. Vijay Sethupathi, the lead actor, also produced the film. Shruti Haasan was cast as the lead actress as Jananathan wanted a "fresh casting". Filming wrapped in December 2020. Jananathan died on 14 March 2021 during the post-production stage, making Laabam his final film as director.

== Soundtrack ==
Laabam

Soundtrack album to Laabam by D. Imman
- Released: 2021
- Recorded: 2021
- Genre: Film soundtrack
- Length: 33:30
- Language: Tamil
- Label: Lahari Music and T-Series
- Producer: D. Imman

D. Imman chronology
Teddy (2021)	Laabam (2021)	Udanpirappe (2021)

The music was composed by D. Imman. The audio rights were acquired by Lahari Music and T-Series.

All lyrics are written by Yugabharathi.

Track listing
No.	Title	Singer(s)	Length
1.	"Yaazha Yaazha"	Shruti Haasan	03:54
2.	"Yaamili Yaamiliya"	Divya Kumar	04:22
3.	"Clara My Name Is Clara"	Sunidhi Chauhan, Kpy Naveen	04:25
4.	"Seruvom Seruvom"	CLEO VII, Srinisha Jayaseelan	03:31
5.	"Uzhaippom Thozha"	Sreenidhi, Narayanan Ravishankar	05:51
6.	"Daylight Robbery (Theme Music)" (instrumental)	D.Imman	03:07
7.	"Yaazha Yaazha (Karaoke)" (instrumental)	D.Imman	03:54
8.	"Clara My Name Is Clara (Karaoke)" (instrumental)	D.Imman	04:25
Total length:			33:30

== Critical reception ==
M Suganth of The Times of India wrote, "The film's narrative is quite fractured. Rather than moving from one incident to the other, here, it moves from one issue to the other at a rapid pace giving us a false sense of momentum." Srinivasa Ramanujam of The Hindu called it "more a visual representation of a protagonist in a television programme [..] than a film".

== Home media ==
The film began streaming on Netflix from October 2021.
