= Lesa Lesa =

2003 film by Priyadarshan

- DVD cover
- Directed by: Priyadarshan
- Written by: N. Prasanna Kumar (dialogues)
- Story by: Original Story: Ranjith; Additional Story: Priyadarshan
- Based on: Summer in Bethlehem (1998) by Ranjith
- Produced by: Vikram Singh
- Starring: Shaam; Trisha; Madhavan
- Cinematography: Tirru
- Edited by: N. Gopalakrishnan
- Music by: Harris Jayaraj
- Production company: Film Works
- Release date: 16 May 2003
- Running time: 154 minutes
- Country: India
- Language: Tamil

Lesa Lesa (/ˈleɪsɑː/ transl. Gently, gently), also referred to as Laysa Laysa, is a 2003 Indian romantic comedy Tamil-language film directed by Priyadarshan. The film stars Shaam and Trisha, while Vivek, Radha Ravi and Sreenivasan play supporting roles. Madhavan makes a special appearance. The music was composed by Harris Jayaraj. The film is a remake of the 1998 Malayalam film Summer in Bethlehem, which was written by Ranjith.

== Plot ==
The story begins with Chandru, a fun-loving, jovial character who has fabricated stories of success to his family. In reality, Chandru has spent the majority of his money and stays with his wealthy friend Rakesh.

During a vacation, Colonel Rajasekar, his grandfather and grandmother arrive with their extended family to spend a couple of days at Chandru's farmhouse. Chandru successfully makes them believe that he is the real owner of the estate and that Rakesh is just his working partner. Rakesh, who is an orphan, is happy to meet a huge family and generously welcomes them. Colonel Rajasekar plans to get Chandru married to one of his granddaughters. Chandru is a bit confused about whom he should choose. To make matters complicated, he has been receiving gifts and messages from one of the granddaughters expressing her love for him. Meanwhile, a few days after they arrive at the estate, Bala, another granddaughter of Rajasekar arrives alone. She seems to be too upset and worried. But within a short period, she calms down and starts enjoying the vacation. During their stay, Chandru and Rakesh decide to discover the girl who had been teasing them with cryptic messages. Eventually, Rakesh falls in love with Bala.

In a conflict between Pandi and Colonel, Pandi exposes that Chandru is a fraud while Rakesh, his owner is the real landlord of the estate. Colonel enraged on hearing this news plans to arrange a marriage between Chandru and Bala. Bala snubs the proposal by declaring that she is in love with Rakesh. Her decision is strongly opposed by the family but eventually agrees as the Colonel approves. Rakesh, at the same time, is happy at heart knowing about Bala's love for him. But she shocks him by saying that she was just using his name to escape the marriage. She tells Rakesh that she is in love with Deva, a college lecturer who is about to be hanged soon over a public issue. Bala has taken a vow not to marry anyone other than Deva.

The night before the wedding, Bala requests Rakesh to take her to jail to meet Deva for one last time. Deva lies that he hates Bala and asks her to never see him again. Enraged, Bala tells Colonel that she doesn't want to marry anyone as she has lost faith in marriage which further disappoints her family.

In the end scene, we can see the family in the railway station showing that their vacation has ended. Bala runs back to Rakesh conveying that Bala loves Rakesh. The train departs slowly and a girl's hand reaches out of the coach window, holding the puppy which was sent as a gift to Chandru before. Chandru takes off running to find out who it is, but he catches only a cryptic message that teases him to follow and discover her identity.

== Cast ==
- Shaam as Rakesh
- Madhavan as Deva Narayanan (special appearance)
- Trisha as Balamani "Bala"
- Vivek as Chandru
- Radharavi as Colonel Rajasekar, Chandru's grandfather
- Sreenivasan as Pandi
- Haneefa as Kailasam, Chandru's foster uncle
- Innocent as Nair
- Sathyapriya as Shanthi, Chandru's grandmother
- Fathima Babu as Varalakshmi
- Mayilsamy as a PCO Owner
- Kovai Senthil as Nandu's father
- Subhi as Chandru's cousin
- Priyanka as Chandru's cousin
- Jyothi Rana as Shyama
- Nandu as Nandu
- Nilam as Chandru's cousin
- Major Ravi as Deva’s friend
- Nishanth as Sekhar
- Ravikumar as DIG Raguram, Rakesh's foster uncle

== Production ==
12B film producer Vikram Singh hired Shaam and composer Harris Jayaraj again for his next venture directed by veteran Priyadarshan. The story of the film was partially adapted from the 1998 Malayalam film Summer in Bethlehem, which was written by Ranjith, and Priyadarshan developed a new screenplay. The project initially developed under the title Kanmani Nee Vara Kaathirunthen, before the makers changed it to Lesa Lesa after hearing the song composed by Jayaraj for the film.

Lesa Lesa became the first film Trisha had signed, and she recalled that she had been trying to avoid films until she finished college but Priyadarshan's offer was "irresistible". She revealed she had no idea about the script of Lesa Lesa when she agreed to do the film and only later did Shaam and her have a one-hour narration of the script. During the making of the film, Trisha was dubbed as the "most happening debutante in Tamil film industry", and signed on to three other projects before the release of Lesa Lesa – Enakku 20 Unakku 18, Mounam Pesiyadhe and Jana (then known as Thiruda), but she later opted out from Jana. The story of the film also required a guest appearance and Priyadarshan chose Madhavan for the role, despite initially considering Arjun. The team also hired Radharavi and Sathyapriya along with four comedians – Vivek, Sreenivasan, Cochin Haneefa and Innocent to play pivotal roles in the film. Art director Sabu Cyril constructed a house in Ooty for the film. Venket Ram took the film's principal photographs, while Siddharth Chandrasekhar of Mittra Media made his debut as a publicity designer with the project.

In order to concentrate on the project, Vikram Singh briefly shelved his other venture, Sivakumar's Acham Thavir starring Madhavan and Jyothika. The team had a forty-day schedule at Ooty, beginning at 6 and winding up at 6. The film was initially set to release in the Diwali season of 2002 but was delayed. The film was to release on Pongal of 2003, but was delayed again. The delay meant that Lesa Lesa did not become Trisha's first film release, with pundits describing the film as "jinxed".

== Soundtrack ==
The film's songs were composed by Harris Jayaraj and lyrics by Vaali. For the first time in Tamil cinema, the team released a single, the title song, priced at nine rupees. Vikram Singh chose to release the audio of the film at a cheap rate, to avoid piracy. The intro of the song "Yedho Ondru" before the hook is based on the Christmas carol "God Rest Ye Merry, Gentlemen". Cinesouth appreciated the soundtrack, writing "Harris Jeyaraj's patience and his adherence to perfection has led him to the next level as far as music composition is concerned. This gives us a draft of fresh air of clean good music just when the likes of 'gaana' songs and cheap lyrics were saturating us. 'Leysa Leysa' did exactly that". Vignesh Ram of Nilacharal wrote "On the whole the album is worthy buying with simple but catchy tunes and techno kind of music. But you cannot resist a feeling that you have heard the songs already".

All lyrics are written by Vaali.

Track listing
No.	Title	Singer(s)	Length
1.	"Aval Ulaghazhagi"	Karthik	5:09
2.	"Lesa Lesa"	Anuradha Sriram	4:41
3.	"Lesa Lesa" (Remix)	Anuradha Sriram, DJ Ivan	4:29
4.	"Mudhal Mudhalai"	Yugendran, Srimathumitha, Tippu	5:29
5.	"Yedho Ondru"	Srilekha Parthasarathy, Harish Raghavendra, Franko	5:37
6.	"Ennai Polave"	K. S. Chithra, Suchitra	5:19
Total length:			30:44

== Release and reception ==
Lesa Lesa was released on 16 May 2003. Initial collections were not so impressive, so distributors in Coimbatore and Madurai allegedly re-printed posters of the film which marketed Madhavan, who appeared in the film in a guest appearance, as the lead star of the film over Shaam to bank in on his star image.

== Controversy ==
Siyad Koker, the producer of Summer in Bethlehem, accused Priyadarshan of remaking that film in Tamil without taking permission or purchasing the right. The Kerala Film Producers Association had banned the screening of all the films of Priyadarsan in the state at the time. Priyadarsan refuted by alleging that Summer in Bethlehem itself is an uncredited remake of American films Fiddler on the Roof and Come September. The matter was later settled, with Priyadarshan paying ₹ 8 lakhs to Siyad and ₹ 3 lakhs each to Ranjith and Sibi Malayil.

== Critical response ==
Malathi Rangarajan of The Hindu gave the film a positive review mentioning that "Shaam once again shows that he is a natural performer" and that the "surprise packet is the entry of Madhavan and as a fiery, forthright and straightforward professor, he makes a mark". The critic added that "every frame of "Lesa Lesa" spells aesthetics, thanks to award winning efforts by art director Sabu Cyril and cinematographer Tirru", concluding that "if one can forget the avoidable protractions in the second half, Vikram Singh's "Lesa Lesa" is a visual treat". Sify praised the performances of the cast, the music, the cinematography, and the art. Malini Mannath of Chennai Online opined that "A clean family entertainer from producer Vikram Singh, the film bogged down by some problems took a long time to hit the theaters. But fortunately, it does not look dated, and seems worth the wait". Visual Dasan of Kalki wrote apart from the music and cinematography, Sabu Cyril's art direction is amazing. Priyadarshan, who has been appreciated for his way of storytelling, as for this film he will be packed up. Cinesouth wrote "The film begins to fumble when you start looking for the story. The chain of events promises a terrific climax, but, the film falls flat when it gets there. Visuals that are meant to be feasts for your eyes, music that is bliss to your ears, comedy that makes your belly ache and nothing more. These are what 'Lesa Lesa' have for you". Indiainfo wrote "A re-make of Malayalam blockbuster SUMMER IN BETHLEHEM is youthful love story. Excellent musical score by Harris Jeyaraj and fine screenplay by Priyadarshan are major assets to the film. In the first half of the film, Vivek steals the show, while in the second half of the film, Madhavan manages to sit through out the film. The film has interesting storyline too".
