= Chitukurinji =

Upcoming Indian Tamil-language film

- Directed by: VJ Meenakshi Sundharam
- Written by: VJ Meenakshi Sundharam
- Starring: Rajith Menon Deepshika
- Cinematography: Francis Rajkumar A.
- Edited by: Mahendran Ganesan
- Music by: Shean L. Cleford
- Production companies: Black and White Media Solutions Pvt. Ltd.
- Release date: November 27, 2026 (India)
- Country: India
- Language: Tamil

Chitukurinji is an upcoming Indian Tamil-language romantic fantasy thriller film written and directed by VJ Meenakshi Sundharam in his feature directorial debut. The film stars Rajith Menon and Deepshika in the lead roles and is produced by Black and White Media Solutions Pvt. Ltd. It is scheduled for a worldwide theatrical release on November 27, 2026.

== Premise ==
The film is set across two different time periods, 1983 and 2023, intertwining romance, mystery and fantasy.

== Cast ==
- Rajith Menon
- Deepshika
- Naksha Saran
- VJ Pappu
- G. M. Kumar
- L. V. Adhavan
- Rams
- Hello Kandhasamy
- Theni Murugan
- Sujatha
- Karate Raja
- Easwarbabu
- Sathyaseelan
- Velachery Sridhar
- Manju
- Jones
- Krishnakumar
- Advocate Babu

== Production ==
The film is written and directed by VJ Meenakshi Sundharam and produced by Black and White Media Solutions Pvt. Ltd. Principal photography was completed in 2026, and the makers announced the commencement of dubbing in July 2026.

== Music ==
The music is composed by debutant music director Maara.

The film's dubbing commenced in July 2026.

An 80-acre mountain village set was constructed for the film.

Post-production began in 2026.

The dubbing schedule was also reported by Chennai City News.
