= Shaam (actor) =

Indian model and actor (born 1977)

- Born: Shamshuddin Ibrahim; 4 April 1977 (age 49); Madurai, Tamil Nadu, India
- Occupations: Actor; model
- Years active: 2000–present
- Height: 5 ft 10 in (178 cm)
- Spouse: Kashish (m. 2003)
- Children: 2

Shamshuddin Ibrahim (born 4 April 1977), known professionally as Shaam, is an Indian actor and model who mainly appears Tamil, Telugu language films also appeared in few Kannada and Malayalam films. Starting his career as a professional model, he soon made his acting debut in the film 12B (2001). He further appeared in lead roles in films such as Lesa Lesa (2003), Iyarkai (2003), and Ullam Ketkumae (2005). He garnered acclaim for his role in the Telugu film Kick (2009), which earned him the name Kick Shaam. Kick enabled Shaam to star in other prominent Telugu films such as Race Gurram (2014). After a hiatus, he returned to Tamil cinema with 6 (2013), Purampokku Engira Podhuvudamai (2015) and Varisu (2023).

== Early life ==
Shamshuddin Ibrahim was born on 4 April 1977 in Madurai, Tamil Nadu. His father hails from Madurai, while his mother is from Tiruppathur. He grew up in Bengaluru, where he pursued his studies. After completing his B Com, he did modelling through which he hoped to become an actor.

== Career ==
=== 2000-2005: Debut and success ===
Shaam began his career as a model in Bengaluru, modelling for various ads. Keen on pursuing an acting career, he was vainly searching for acting offers for four years. He auditioned for the debut lead role in Kadhalar Dhinam (1999), but did not receive the role. He then, following the recommendation of his model coordinator Biju Jayadevan, got to meet cinematographer Jeeva, who was planning to make his directorial debut and was on the lookout for a new face for the film's lead role. He was given the role for the film 12B. He recollects that during his first meeting with Jeeva, he handed over his portfolio and introduced himself in English, when Jeeva heard him out, and then said, "Repeat what you just said, in Tamil" and Shaam did, and was subsequently signed on the next day after a meeting with producer Vikram Singh. The promos of the film were critically praised with Shaam signing on to appear on several projects before 12B even released.

His second feature film, however, the S. J. Suryah-directed Kushi, in which he appeared in a cameo role, released first, since 12B got stuck in production and released in 2001 only. The film which was a blatant rip-off of Sliding Doors, which itself had numerous comparisons with director Krzysztof Kieślowski's 1982 Polish film Blind Chance, fetched rave reviews and was seen as a "dream entry" for Shaam, whose performance was praised as "apt". Shaam was set to work with K. Balachander after Paarthale Paravasam (2001), but the project never materialised. His subsequent releases including Vasanth's Yai! Nee Romba Azhaga Irukey! (2002), Anbe Anbe (2003) and Priyadarshan's Lesa Lesa (2003), garnered only average or poor box office returns. He took a break from his romantic hero films with Bala (2002) but the failure of the film caused him to stick to romantic films. He was approached to play the third male lead role in Aaytha Ezhuthu, but was unable to sign the film because of date issues with Iyarkai. Iyarkai by debutant S P Jananathan was his final release of 2003 and also failed at the box office due to a delayed release, but opened to high critical acclaim, even winning the National Film Award for Best Feature Film in Tamil.

Ullam Ketkumae, directed by Jeeva, finally was a commercial success. It is Shaam's first successful film and a critic noted that "he is able to bring out the sensibilities of the character". ABCD, a romance film released in August 2005.

=== 2006–2008: Downfalls ===
In 2006, he acted in love story, Manathodu Mazhaikalam, which released to negative reviews. He made his Kannada debut in the film Tananam Tananam playing the role of a blind man.

In 2007, post the death of Jeeva, Shaam struggled to succeed in the Tamil film industry.

In 2008, he appeared in the film, Thoondil directed by K. S. Adhiyaman. The next is Inba alongside Sneha in which he played a macho man. These films had no impact at the box office.

=== 2009–2018: Action and comedy roles ===
Following several more unsuccessful films, he got a major break in Surender Reddy's Telugu action film Kick (2009) as a police officer. He was cast in the film after Surender Reddy saw his stills from Agam Puram (2010). The success of Kick caused his previous films to release in Telugu: Inba was released in Telugu as Neelo Naalo (2009) with a comedy track featuring Sunil and Agam Puram was dubbed in Telugu as Gang War in 2011. Shaam signed his second Telugu film, a biopic Y. S. Rajasekhara Reddy. However, due to the crisis in Andhra Pradesh at the time, the film failed to materialize. Several films that he signed did not enter production or remained unreleased including the Tamil films Sivamayam and Sariya Tavara; the Telugu films Cash and Maya; and the Malayalam film Koodaram. He reprised his role from Kick in the Tamil remake, titled Thillalangadi (2010). He went on to play similar roles in Veera (2011) and Race Gurram (2014). Then he tried his luck in Hindi with director Faisal Saif in the Hindi film Mujhe Maaf Karo. The film, however, got stuck in production. Regarding his role in Veera, a critic noted that "Shaam fits into his character perfectly, but he has hardly any screen time to shine". Post the release of Kick, Shaam further collaborated with Reddy in Oosaravelli (2011), Race Gurram (2014), and Kick 2 (2015). He was cast in negative roles in several other Telugu-language films including Kalyanram Kathi (2010) and Oxygen (2017).

In late 2011, he appeared in the film 6, which released to positive reviews. For his role in the film, he spent more than a dozen sleepless nights, which resulted in a big swelling below his eyes and for another look, hereduced his weight and grew his hair long and a beard. Although the film released to positive reviews, the film failed to do well at the box office. After the positive response of the film, Kannada actor, Sudeep, announced that he was going to do a multilingual film with Shaam.

In mid 2014, Shaam appear as Allu Arjun's brother in the film Race Gurram (2014). In a review of the film, a critic stated that "Shaam as the arrogant elder brother Ram delivers a good performance". He was signed to portray one of the lead roles in Kaala Koothu in 2015 and grew his beard for the role. However, he left the role due to differences with the director. In 2015, he won critical acclaim for his portrayal of an honest police officer in Jananathan's political drama Purampokku Engira Podhuvudamai (2015), which had an ensemble cast featuring Arya and Vijay Sethupathi. In an IBT review of the film, the reviewer stated that "Shaam as a police officer stands out among all the leading characters, with the intensity he portrays in his role". Shaam's next release was the Kannada suspense thriller Game, which was also shot in Tamil as Oru Melliya Kodu alongside Arjun and Manisha Koirala. The Kannada version released in February 2016 to positive reviews and the Tamil version released in July 2016 to mixed reviews. That same year, he played a negative role in the Kannada-language film Santhu Straight Forward. He made his Malayalam debut with The Great Father (2017). In August 2017, he was cast in Venkat Prabhu's multi-starrer Party in a negative role; however, the film remains unreleased since 2018.

=== 2019–present ===
After a brief sabbatical in Tamil films, Shaam returned with the long delayed Tamil film Kaaviyyan in 2019. The film released to negative reviews. A critic from The Times of India wrote that "The film, however, is sure to disappoint those who even go without any expectation". He played a negative role in Naanga Romba Busy (2020) starring Prasanna and Ashwin Kakumanu. Shaam has played the role of one of Vijay’s brothers in Varisu (2023).

== Personal life ==
Shamsuddin has three brothers and two sisters. He is married to a Punjabi, Kashish, who was his college mate.

In July of 2020, Shamsuddin was arrested by the Chennai police for illegal gambling activities at his home. 13 people, including the actor, were arrested, booked under the Gaming Act, then let off on bail. Money and bundle of cards used in the illegal gambling activities, were confiscated from his apartment, by the police.

== Filmography ==
Year	Title	Role	Language	Notes
2000	Kushi	Shiva's friend	Tamil	Uncredited role
2001	12B	Shakthivel	Tamil	Debut film
2002	Yai! Nee Romba Azhaga Irukey!	Hari	Tamil	
2002	Bala	Bala	Tamil	
2003	Anbe Anbe	Cheenu	Tamil	
2003	Lesa Lesa	Rakesh	Tamil	
2003	Iyarkai	Marudhu	Tamil	
2005	Girivalam	Arjun	Tamil	
2005	Ullam Ketkumae	Shyam	Tamil	
2005	ABCD	Anand	Tamil	
2006	Manathodu Mazhaikalam	Siva	Tamil	
2006	Tananam Tananam	Shankar	Kannada	Debut in Kannada cinema
2008	Thoondil	Sriram	Tamil	
2008	Inba	Inba	Tamil	
2009	Kick	Kalyan Krishna	Telugu	Debut in Telugu cinema
2009	Anthony Yaar?	Anthony	Tamil	
2010	Thillalangadi	Krishna Kumar	Tamil	
2010	Kalyanram Kathi	Krishna Mohan	Telugu	
2010	Agam Puram	Thiru	Tamil	
2011	Veera	Shyamsunder	Telugu	
2011	Oosaravelli	Surya	Telugu	
2011	Kshetram	Chakradeva Rayalu	Telugu	
2013	Action 3D	Ajay	Telugu	
2013	6	Ram	Tamil	Also co-producer
2014	Race Gurram	ACP Allu Ram Prasad IPS	Telugu	
2015	Purampokku Engira Podhuvudamai	Macaulay	Tamil	25th Film
2015	Kick 2	Kalyan Krishna	Telugu	Cameo appearance
2016	Game	Akshay	Kannada	
2016	Oru Melliya Kodu	Akshay	Tamil	
2016	Santhu Straight Forward	Deva	Kannada	
2017	The Great Father	Samuel	Malayalam	Cameo appearance
2017	Oxygen	Mahendra Raghupathi	Telugu	
2019	Kaaviyyan	Akilan Vishwanath	Tamil	
2020	Naanga Romba Busy	Ravichandran	Tamil	Television film
2022	Poikkal Kudhirai	ACP	Tamil	Cameo appearance
2023	Varisu	Ajay Rajendran	Tamil	
2024	Viswam	Karthik	Telugu	
2025	Asthram	Inspector Akhilan	Tamil	
2025	They Call Him OG	Chakravarthy "Chakri" Roy Nandan	Telugu	
2026	Leader	DCP Bakthavachalam	Tamil	
2026	Srinivasa Mangapuram	Peddi Reddy	Telugu	

=== Television ===
Year	Title	Role	Network	Language	Ref.
2009	Boys vs Girls Season 2	Guest	Star Vijay	Tamil	
2021	Dance vs Dance Season 2	Team leader	Colors Tamil	Tamil	
2024	Goli Soda Rising	Vellai Ravi	Disney+ Hotstar	Tamil	

=== Music videos ===
Year	Song	Composer	Singer(s)	Ref.
2025	"Varum Vetri"	Amresh Ganesh	Sudeepa	
