= S. P. Jananathan =

Indian film director (1959–2021)

S.P. Jananathan
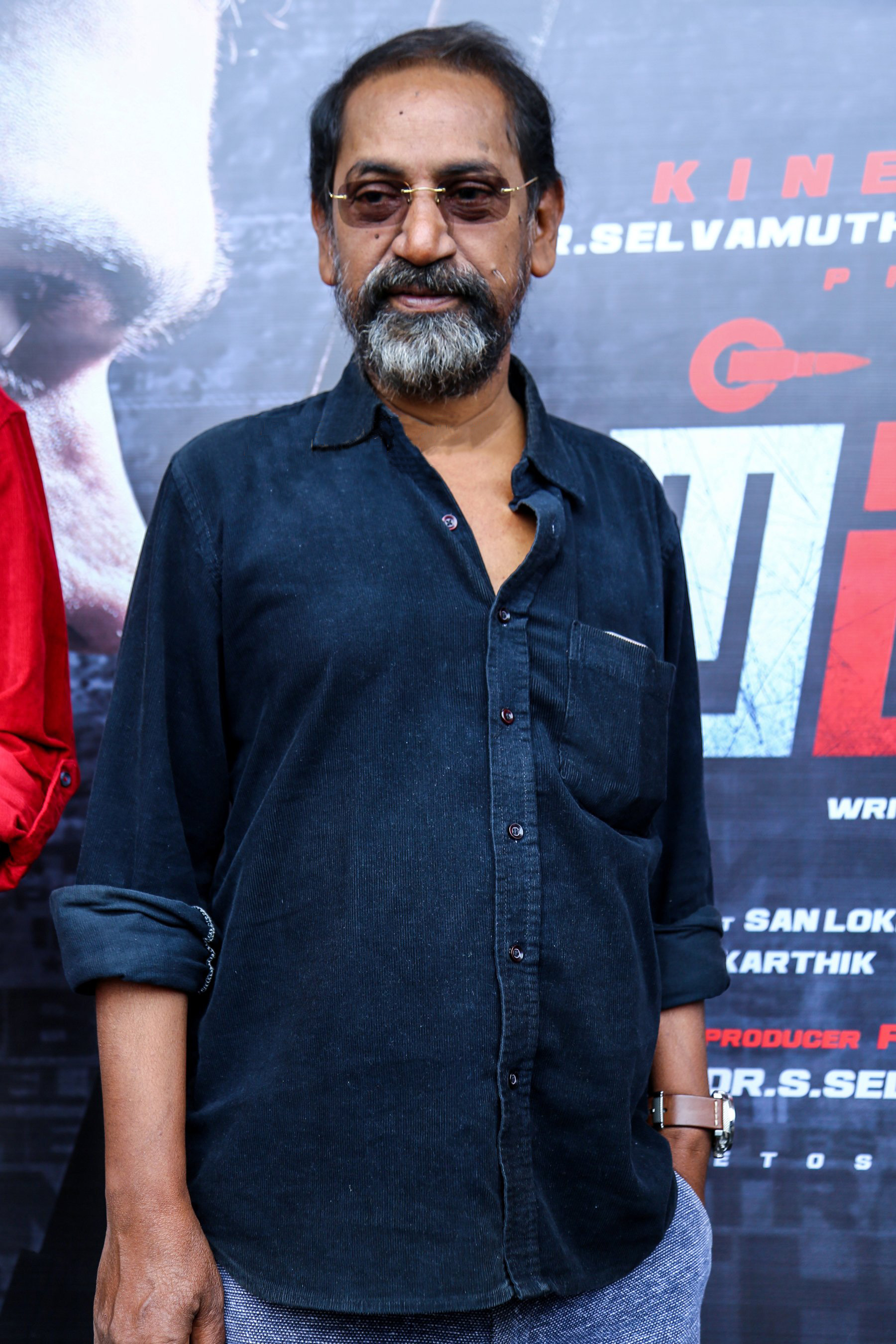
- Born: 7 May 1959; Tanjore - Vadaseri, Madras State (now Thanjavur, Tamil Nadu), India
- Died: 14 March 2021 (aged 61); Chennai, Tamil Nadu, India
- Occupations: Film director, producer
- Years active: 2003–2021

S. P. Jananathan (7 May 1959 – 14 March 2021) was an Indian film director, who worked in Tamil cinema.

== Early life ==
Jananathan worked as an assistant to directors like B. Lenin, Bharathan, Vincent Selva and Keyaar. He was a treasurer of the Tamil Film Directors’ Union. He produced Purampokku in collaboration with UTV Motion Pictures. Apart from directing, he also served as a visual effects director for Dharma and an associate director for Kumbakonam Gopalu, both of which were directed by Keyaar.

== Career ==
Jananathan's debut film as a director was the romantic drama Iyarkai (2003). Although it failed to deliver expectations in the box office, it went onto win the National Film Award for Best Feature Film in Tamil in 2004.

In 2006, he directed the medical thriller film E. His third directorial film, Peraanmai, was an action-adventure film loosely based on the 1972 Russian movie The Dawns Here Are Quiet.

In 2015, Jananathan directed the political thriller Purampokku Engira Podhuvudamai, featuring Arya, Shaam, and Vijay Sethupathi. The film also saw the director making his debut as a producer.

His final directorial film was the 2021 film Laabam, in which he collaborated with Vijay Sethupathi for a second time.

== Death ==
Jananthan died on 14 March 2021 at the age of 61 after being unconscious for two days following a cardiac arrest. Prior to his death, he underwent treatment at a private hospital in Chennai and was under ventilator support. He was admitted in the ICU on 11 March 2021 by his assistants who found him unstable and unconscious at his residence in Chennai.

His final film, Laabam, was released six months after his death.

== Filmography ==
=== As film director and writer ===
- Note: he is credited in all films as S. P. Jhananathan.

| Year | Film | Credited as | | | Notes |
| Year | Film | Director | Story | Dialogues | Notes |
|---|---|---|---|---|---|
| 2003 | Iyarkai | Yes | Yes | Yes | Winner, National Film Award for Best Feature Film in Tamil |
| 2006 | E | Yes | Yes | Yes | |
| 2009 | Peraanmai | Yes | Yes | Yes | |
| 2015 | Purampokku Engira Podhuvudamai | Yes | Yes | Yes | Also producer |
| 2015 | Bhooloham | No | No | Yes | |
| 2021 | Laabam | Yes | Yes | Yes | Posthumous release |

=== Other crew positions ===
| Year | Film | Role | Notes |
|---|---|---|---|
| 1998 | Dharma | Visual effects director | |

=== Recurring collaborations ===
Only people with 3+ collaborations are listed. Editor N. Ganesh Kumar and art director V. Selvakumar have worked on all of his films.

| Films | N. Ganesh Kumar | V. Selvakumar | N. Kalyanakrishnan | V. T. Vijayan | N. K. Ekambaram |
|---|---|---|---|---|---|
| Iyarkai (2003) | Yes | Yes | Yes | Yes | Yes |
| E (2006) | Yes | Yes | Yes | Yes | Yes |
| Peraanmai | Yes | Yes | Yes | Yes | |
| Purampokku Engira Podhuvudamai (2015) | Yes | Yes | Yes | | Yes |
| Laabam (2021) | Yes | Yes | | | |
