= Vallamai =

2025 Tamil film by Karuppaiyaa Murugan

- Theatrical release poster
- Directed by: Karuppaiyaa Murugan
- Written by: Karuppaiyaa Murugan
- Produced by: Karuppaiyaa Murugan
- Starring: Premji Amaren; Dhivadarshini
- Cinematography: Sooraj Nallusami
- Edited by: C Ganesh Kumar
- Music by: GKV
- Production company: Battlers Cinema
- Release date: 25 April 2025
- Running time: 109 minutes
- Country: India
- Language: Tamil

Vallamai (transl. Strength) is a 2025 Indian Tamil-language film written, directed and produced by Karuppaiyaa Murugan under his Battlers Cinema banner starring Premgi Amaren and Dhivadarshini in the lead roles.

Vallamai was released in theatres on 25 April 2025.

== Cast ==
- Premgi Amaren as Saravanan
- Dhivadarshini as Boomika
- Deepa Shankar
- Valakku en Muthuraman
- Supergood Subramani as Police constable
- Rajith Menon
- Seerkavi Saravanan as Boomika's Bharatanatyam Teacher
- Vidhu as Petrol thief

== Production ==
The film is written, directed and produced by Karuppaiyaa Murugan under his Battlers Cinema, who earlier directed Vidiyatha Iravondru Vendum (2022), now with Premji Amaren in the lead role, who was last seen in The Greatest of All Time (2024) under his brother Venkat Prabhu's direction. The technical team consists of cinematographer Sooraj Nallusami, music composer GKV, editor C Ganesh Kumar, art director SK Ajay, and stunt director SR Harimurugan.

== Soundtrack ==
The film has music composed by GKV. The first single "Magale En Magale" sung by Venkat Prabhu released on 12 March 2025.

No.	Title	Lyrics	Singer(s)	Length
1.	"Magale En Magale"	Karuppaiyaa Murugan	Venkat Prabhu

== Release ==
=== Theatrical ===
Vallamai was released in theatres on 25 April 2025. The film was certified 'U/A' by the Central Board of Film Certification.

=== Home media ===
Vallamai is set to be premiered on Aha Tamil on 23 May 2025.

== Critical response ==
A critic of Dinamalar rated the film 2.5/5 by criticizing its immature scenes and the weak screenplay. A critic of Maalai Malar gave 2/5 stars and criticized the film's screenplay and the lack of cohesion in the visuals. Abhinav Subramanian of The Times of India gave 1.5/5 stars and wrote "Director Karuppaiyaa Murugan occasionally captures something genuine about the rural-to-urban transition, but the handling of the sensitive central plot feels awkward and half-baked. The revenge storyline lacks any punch, with confrontations that fall flat and a villain hunt that veers into unintentional comedy territory." Akshay Kumar of Cinema Express wrote "Vallamai, to sum up, leaves much to be desired, especially after showing promise in the early scenes. The film falters by pushing the emotionally healthy responses of the victim and her family to an implausible extreme. The screenplay fails to craft a humanistic arc for its leads, and this shortcoming is only worsened by a poorly conceived revenge track."
