= Suruli Manohar =

Indian film actor

- Born: c. 1963
- Died: 7 August 2014 (aged 51); Chennai, Tamil Nadu, India
- Occupation: Actor
- Years active: 2000–2014
- Spouse: Pachaiamma

Suruli Manohar was a Tamil Indian film actor and comedian who appeared in many films and television serials. He is known for his roles in Padikkadavan, Sura and many other movies.

== Filmography ==
=== Films ===
- Veeranadai (2000)
- Ponnana Neram (2001)
- Indru Mudhal (2003)
- Iyarkai (2003)
- Image (2004)
- Ghilli (2004)
- Maayavi (2005)
- Englishkaran (2005)
- Kundakka Mandakka (2005)
- Kai Vandha Kalai (2006)
- E (2006)
- Kalakkura Chandru (2007)
- Ennai Paar Yogam Varum (2007)
- Oru Ponnu Oru Paiyan (2007)
- Pazhaniappa Kalloori (2007)
- Yaaruku Yaaro (2007)
- Thozha (2008)
- Maanavan Ninaithal (2008)
- Padikkadavan (2009)
- Enga Raasi Nalla Raasi (2009)
- Thoranai (2009)
- Kadhal Kadhai (2009)
- Jaganmohini (2009)
- Sura (2010)
- Kadhal Meipada (2011)
- Marudhavelu (2011)
- Aathi Narayana (2012)
- Marupadiyum Oru Kadhal (2012)
- Naanum En Jamunavum (2013)
- Moondru Per Moondru Kadal (2013)
- Ennamo Nadakkudhu (2014)
- Sutta Pazham Sudatha Pazham (2016) (posthumously released)
- Samuga Valaithalam (2018) (posthumously released)
- Onbathu Kuzhi Sampath (2020) (posthumously released)

=== Television ===
Year	Title	Role	Channel	Notes
1998–2004	Meendum Meendum Sirippu		Sun TV	
2003–2009	Kolangal	Sundaramoorthy	Sun TV	
2009–2015	Thendral	Sivagadacham	Sun TV	

== Personal life and death ==
Manohar had a wife, Pachaiamma, and three daughters. He developed cancer and received treatment for some time. He was admitted to hospital but died a few months later on 7 August 2014.
