= Iyarkai =

2003 film by S. P. Jhananathan

- Poster
- Directed by: S. P. Jhananathan
- Screenplay by: N. Kalyanakrishnan
- Story by: S. P. Jhananathan
- Dialogues by: S. P. Jhananathan
- Produced by: V. R. Kumar; A. E. Gunasekaran; G. Natarajan
- Starring: Shaam; Radhika
- Cinematography: N. K. Ekambaram
- Edited by: N. Ganesh Kumar
- Music by: Vidyasagar
- Production company: Prisem Films
- Distributed by: Prisem Films
- Release date: 21 November 2003
- Running time: 140 minutes
- Country: India
- Language: Tamil
- Budget: ₹1 crore

Iyarkai (Note: The film was alternatively titled as Eyarkai or Eiyarkai.) ( transl. Nature) is a 2003 Indian Tamil-language romantic drama film directed by S. P. Jhananathan in his directorial debut. The film stars Shaam and Radhika. Arun Vijay—who at the time was known as Arun Kumar—makes a cameo appearance and Bollywood actor Seema Biswas plays a supporting role. Iyarkai marks the debuts of Radhika and Biswas in Tamil cinema.

Based on Fyodor Dostoevsky's short story "White Nights", the film revolves around a young woman who is unable to accept the love of a sailor because she is in love with a ship captain who was lost at sea. It was made on a budget of one crore (₹10,000,000). Vidyasagar composed the music for the film.

Iyarkai was released on 21 November 2003. Although the film was not successful at the box office, the film won the National Film Award for Best Feature Film in Tamil at the 51st National Film Awards in 2004, and N. K. Ekambaram won the Tamil Nadu State Film Award for Best Cinematographer.

== Plot ==
Marudhu, a sailor, arrives at Rameswaram port, Tamil Nadu from Rome, Italy after being away for 14 years. At Senthil Aandavar Bar, a popular bar in the port, he meets Nandu while playing cards against Dorai and his posse at the bar. Marudhu asks Nandu where the church is. Nandu directs Marudhu to the church, where he tells the parish priest, Stephen, the story of a captain who attempted to escape from his capsized ship. Marudhu later meets Nancy, who overheard his conversation with Stephen, at a roadside restaurant run by her sister-in-law, Mercy.

One day, Nandu comes to the bar with a bandaged nose. After seeing that Nandu is hurt, Marudhu looks for Dorai. A member from Dorai's posse tells Dorai that Marudhu is looking for him and Dorai goes in search of Marudhu. Marudhu finds Dorai fights him and his men. While fighting Dorai, Marudhu asks him who is he looking for, and if it is his lover. Nancy, overhears their conversation and, distracted by her thoughts, gets her dress stuck on train tracks as she is walking. Marudhu saves Nancy from an incoming train. She tells Marudhu to come to the only lighthouse in town at 6 p.m.

Later that day, Marudhu is directed to remove a stuck object from his ship's propeller. While effecting the repair, the propeller turns on and Marudhu is injured, making him unable to go to the lighthouse. To Marudhu's dismay, Nancy tells Marudhu that she was not waiting for him, but for a ship captain that she had met three years ago while selling mangoes and had fallen in love with. The ship captain had told her not to wait for him because she was too young to make a proper judgement about love, but he gave her a ring. Nancy also persuaded him to promise to return in one year.

Marudhu decides to help Nancy in her search for the ship captain. The search proves difficult, however, because Nancy does not know the captain's name, as she only addressed him as "Sir" and "Officer". After Marudhu reveals his love for Nancy, she distances herself from him. One day, Nancy comes across Joe, a crewman who sailed under the ship captain, after recognising him in the bar. Joe tells Nancy that the ship captain's name is Mukundan and that he died in a shipwreck. The next day, Mercy wakes up and realises that Nancy is missing. She tells Marudhu to go find Nancy. He gets on a ship docked at the port going to Sri Lanka after being directed there by one of the people working in the port. He finds an emotionally unstable Nancy sitting in the ship. Marudhu tries to get Nancy off the ship, but a man named Adam tells him that he cannot take her unless he fights him. After they fight, Nancy jumps off the ship and Marudhu follows to save her.

At night, Nancy and Marudhu sail on a canoe in search of Mukundan, when Marudhu accidentally loses Nancy's ring. The next day, he returns the ring to Nancy and tells the church father that he and his ship crew are planning to leave Christmas night. He writes his name on one piece of paper and "Captain" on the other and asks the church father to choose one of the papers, which he takes with him. On Christmas Eve, a man, unbeknownst to Nancy, arrives in the port. Marudhu helps the man get off his boat although Marudhu does not know that the man that he helped is Mukundan.

Marudhu asks Nancy if she is willing to accept his love. He starts to open the piece of paper to sees whose name is written, before Nancy stops him and agrees to marry him the next day, on Christmas. During their wedding, Nancy sees Marudhu and a group of other men dancing with Santa Claus masks. One of the men kneels and presents a ring on Nancy. To Nancy's surprise, the man removes his mask and reveals that he is Mukundan, not Marudhu. A depressed Marudhu leaves aboard his ship and drops the piece of paper into the ocean.

== Cast ==
- Shaam as Marudhu
- Arun as Mukundan (special appearance)
- Radhika as Nancy
- Senthil as the Senthil Aandavar Bar owner
- Seema Biswas as Mercy
- Chinni Jayanth as "Hawala" Arumugam
- Pasupathy as Father Stephen
- Karunas as Nandu
- Crane Manohar as a magician
- Suruli Manohar as a magician
- Kumaravel as an exorcist
- Abhinayashree (special appearance in the song "Seetu Kattu")
- Freddy Odiyo as Joe
- Antony Paul as Dorai
- Ahmed Adam as Adam

== Production ==
=== Development ===
S. P. Jhananathan began work on Iyarkai in 2001. Jhananathan's upbringing on Marina Beach—hanging out with fishermen's children, working on the harbor, and hearing stories of his friends from their six month sailing journeys—inspired him to make the film set in a ship with the sea as its backdrop. Jhananathan was reported to have taken inspiration for the story from his friend's uncle, who, immediately after getting married, went alone on a boat voyage in the Mediterranean Sea. He was lost and his body was nowhere to be found. Unaware of the situation, his wife awaited his return. However, the film is actually an unofficial adaptation of Fyodor Dostoevsky's short story "White Nights", which was translated into Tamil as Vennira Iravugal. The film reuses several sub-plots from the short story, such as a man falling in love with a distressed woman, the woman telling him about her failed romance, and the man about to tell her his love right when the past lover returns. Jhananathan told the story to producer Ramkumar Ganesan, whose cousin V. R. Kumar became the producer after liking the story. The film was titled Iyarkai (transl. Nature) because the conflict between man and nature causes a woman to wait for her past lover to return. Assistant director N. Kalyanakrishnan co-wrote the film with Jhananathan.

=== Casting ===
Suriya turned down the offer to play the lead role, saying he was not interested in doing romantic films. Shaam, whom Jhananathan worked with as an assistant editor on 12B (2001), was cast instead and signed the film prior to the release of 12B. Radhika, an actress in Kannada cinema, made her Tamil cinema debut as Nancy. The media referred to her as "Kutti" (குட்டி; transl. small) Radhika to differentiate her from the Tamil actress of the same name. Jhananathan based Nancy on his friend's uncle's wife and described her as an independent woman with the autonomy to choose the man with whom she wants a relationship. Deepa Venkat dubbed for Radhika in the film.

Arun Kumar was chosen to play the ship captain, a character based on the life of Jhananathan's friend's uncle. He turned down the role because he was not interested in a cameo, but he later changed his mind after Jananathan explained the role's importance in the film. Seema Biswas was cast as Nancy's sister-in-law, who is a chain smoking Anglo-Indian widow. Jhananathan felt that Biswas was apt for the character, and the film marked her Tamil debut. Although he was advised not to, Pasupathy accepted the role of the priest since he did not want to get typecasted as a villain. Pop singer Karunas was cast in a singing role in the film. Various foreigners played supporting roles in the film.

=== Filming ===
The film's first and second schedules were completed by the first half of 2003. The first song Vidyasagar composed for the film, "Kaadhal Vandhaal", was recorded before the film's first schedule in Tuticorin. The film's first schedule was a twenty-one day shoot at Rameshwaram, Tiruchendur, and Tuticorin. The second schedule was a twelve-day shoot at the Andaman Islands. Since Jhananathan demanded an abandoned, slanted lighthouse be erected on the Andaman Islands, art director Sabu Cyril spotted an island an hour away from Port Blair and built a five-foot lighthouse there with the help of fellow art director V. Selvakumar and thirty crew members (including ten carpenters, three molders and two painters) in eight days. While shooting in a coastal hamlet, Shaam interacted with the locals to imitate their mannerisms.

== Soundtrack ==
The music was composed by Vidyasagar with lyrics by Vairamuthu. The song "Kaadhal Vandhaal" was well received upon release.

Track listing
No.	Title	Singer(s)	Length
1.	"Iyarkai Thaaye"	Karthik, Srivarthini	4:41
2.	"Pazhaya Kural"	Sujatha	5:06
3.	"Kaadhal Vandhaal"	Tippu, Manikka Vinayagam	5:59
4.	"Alaiye Alaiye"	Shankar Mahadevan	4:34
5.	"Seetu Kattu"	Karthik, Manikka Vinayagam	5:56
Total length:			26:17

== Release and reception ==
"I feel audiences should appreciate a good film. I get confused when a film with no storyline, and which has just five songs and three fights, succeeds at the box office, and a well-made film like Iyarkai fails. Does that mean the audience wants only five songs and three solid fights, and no story?"

— Shaam on the film's box office failure, 2005

Iyarkai was scheduled to be released on 24 October 2003, coinciding with the Diwali festival, but the release was delayed due to financial issues. The film was released to positive reviews, but it was a box office failure due to a lack of publicity and its delayed release. The film did not lose money because it was produced on a low budget.

Malathi Rangarajan of The Hindu praised the cinematography and art direction, stating: "Together with Sabu Cyril-Selvan's art, K. Ekambaram's lens paints a bewitching picture on screen". She also praised the performances of most of the cast and Radhika's dubbing but was critical of the inclusion of Seema Biswas and had mixed feelings about Vidyasagar's re-recording, which was either soothing or jarring. Visual Dasan of Kalki appreciated the use of montage shots and Radhika's performance, but opined that Seema Biswas was underused.

R. Rangaraj of Chennai Online gave the film a positive review and wrote: "The debutant director, S P Jhananathan, has handled the build-up to the climax and the climax scenes too effectively. The end is rather stunning and unexpected for a Tamil movie". He also noted that the film may not have succeeded at the box office because it lacked commercial elements. A critic from Sify wrote that "The three characters Shaam, Radhika and Arun Kumar are excellent. Shaam laces his portrayal with seriousness and dry wit, which he has not been able to do earlier. Newcomer Radhika looks fresh but has to improve in her acting. Arun Kumar is a revelation but Seema Biswas is wasted in an insignificant role. The interwoven screenplay is fresh and the climax is strange, intriguing and riveting". G. Ulaganathan of Deccan Herald wrote, "Jananathan has given a neat and laudable film. He looks at the love triangle from a different perspective and [succeeds] in carrying the audience with him".

== Accolades ==
Upon release, Ekambaram sent Iyarkai to the National Awards committee. The film won the National Film Award for Best Feature Film in Tamil for 2003, competing with Virumaandi and Pithamagan. Jhananathan wanted to return the award in protest of the death penalty for the hanging of Dhananjoy Chatterjee, but he did not do so. That same year, N. K. Ekambaram won the Tamil Nadu State Film Award for Best Cinematographer.

== Legacy ==
Jhananathan wanted to shoot the film's sequel in Fiji, but the film never entered production due to his untimely death. On 21st November in 2022 and 2023, several netizens celebrated the film on Twitter (rebranded as X in 2023), coinciding with the film's nineteenth and twentieth anniversaries, respectively. As of November 2024, the film is available to stream on Sun NXT and OTTplay Premium.
