= Harris Jayaraj =

Indian composer (born 1975)

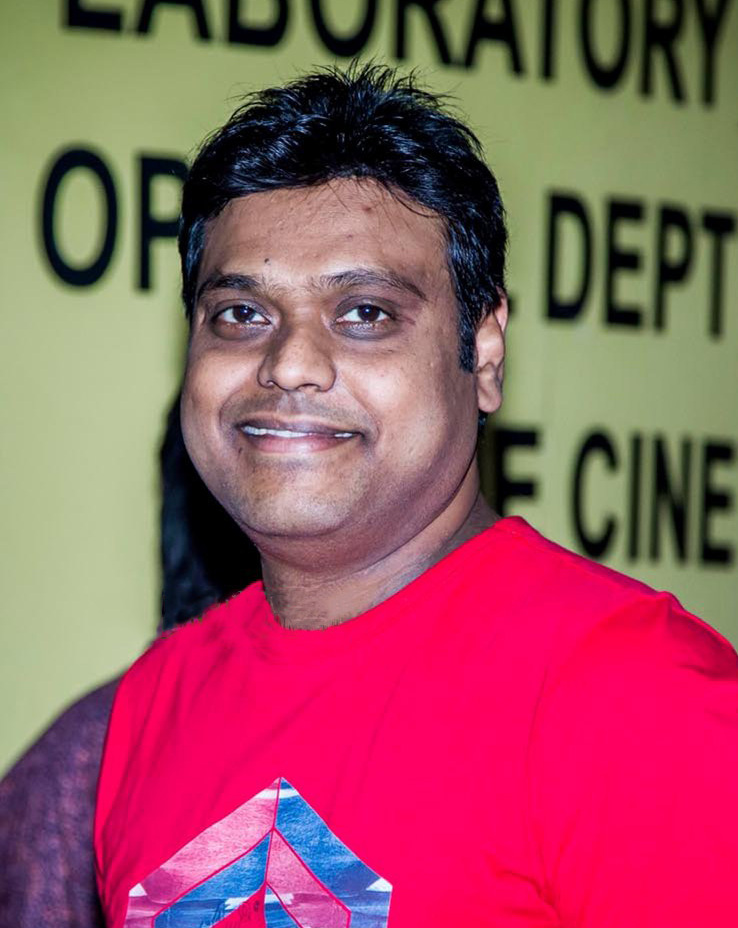
- Harris at Gethu Audio Launch
- Born: 8 January 1975 (age 51); Madras, Tamil Nadu, India
- Occupations: Composer; music producer; songwriter; musician keyboardist; guitarist
- Spouse: Suma Jayaraj (m. 1999)
- Children: 2
- Musical career
- Origin: Madras, Tamil Nadu, India
- Genres: Film score, World Music, Soundtrack
- Instruments: Guitar, Synthesizer, Piano, Percussion, Keyboard
- Years active: 2001–present
- Labels: Sony Music India; T-Series; Think Music India; Divo; Ayngaran; Junglee; Aditya; Zee; Saregama

Harris Jayaraj (born 8 January 1975) is an Indian composer from Tamil Nadu. He composes soundtracks predominantly for Tamil films, and has also composed for a few films in Telugu and Hindi.

He has been honoured with Kalaimamani Award from the Government of Tamil Nadu and the Life Time Achievement Award from Konijeti Rosaiah, the Governor of Tamil Nadu. Since 2001, he has won 6 Filmfare Awards South and received 20 Filmfare Awards South nominations. He has also won 6 Mirchi Music Awards, 5 Vijay Awards, 4 Tamil Nadu State Film Awards, 3 International Tamil Film Awards and Big FM Awards. In 2019, he was bestowed with the Dr. M.G.R. Educational and Research Institute Honorary Doctorate of Letters for his contribution to Tamil cinema music.

== Early life ==
Harris Jayaraj was born and brought up in Chennai to Tamil parents. His father hails from a Christian family and his mother from a Hindu family. He studied at Krishnaswamy Matric School. At age six, Harris began his formal training in carnatic music. His father, S. M. Jayakumar, was a noted film guitarist and had frequently collaborated with T. M. Soundararajan, A. L. Raghavan, M.S.Viswanathan, Soolamangalam Sisters, K. J. Yesudas, S. Janaki, Shankar Ganesh, S.P. Balasubramaniam, K. V. Mahadevan, Malaysia Vasudevan, L. R. Eswari, Jikki, K. Jamuna Rani, P.Susheela and Malayalam music director Shyam. Following two distressing bomb blast incidents, Jayakumar became more religiously inclined and young Harris had to take over the family responsibility. His father wanted him to become a guitarist and made him learn classical guitar from A. Abdul Sattar.

Harris scored the highest mark in Asia on his 4th grade exam of Trinity College of Music, London. He started his music career as a guitarist under M. S. Viswanathan's assistant Joseph Krishna for a Malayalam film and he was paid ₹200. Harris could pursue his academics only up to High School, by then he always had problem with his attendance due to his recording sessions. Having been trained in classical guitar, Harris completed Grade VIII exams conducted by the Trinity College, London. Later he started playing keyboard and developed interest in synthesizers, becoming a self-taught synthesist. He then started programming with his Roland MC-500 and went on to work as a programmer under more than twenty five music directors in Tamil, Telugu, Hindi, Kannada, Malayalam, Bengali, Bhojpuri, Marathi, Punjabi and Oriya working in more than 600 projects till the year 2000. Until 2000, he worked under noted composers including Raj–Koti, A. R. Rahman, Mani Sharma, Karthik Raja, Yuvan Shankar Raja, Sirpy, Suresh Peters, Chandrabose, Shyam, Ouseppachan, Adithyan, Vidyasagar and Bala Bharathi. In his early years as a musician, Harris has worked in movie soundtracks and film scores of various popular movies including Muthu, Seevalaperi Pandi, Asuran, Indian, Aravindhan, Ullaasam, Ratchagan, Jeans, Padayappa, Poovellam Kettuppar, Mudhalvan, Taj Mahal, Taal and Kandukondain Kandukondain. While working as an additional programmer under A. R. Rahman, he composed music for various television commercials including a Coca-Cola commercial featuring actor Vijay. In his early years, he admired music composers M. S. Viswanathan, Ennio Morricone, A. R. Rahman, Salil Chowdhury, and Hans Zimmer.

== Film career ==
Harris debuted as a composer with Gautham Vasudev Menon's Minnale. The album was well received, particularly the song Vaseegara sung by Bombay Jayashri was exceptionally popular. He received the Filmfare Award for Best Music Director – Tamil for his work in Minnale, breaking the 9 years continuous record of A. R. Rahman. The following soundtrack albums 12B and Majunu met with high acclaim and praise. He also composed for the Hindi remake of Minnale titled Rehnaa Hai Terre Dil Mein, also directed by Gautham Menon. Most of the tunes from the Tamil version were retained in the Hindi version too, and only two fresh tunes were composed. He then worked in Lesa Lesa directed by Priyadarshan. The title track of Lesa Lesa was the first song in India to be released as a single prior to a film soundtrack album release. Harris made his debut in Telugu cinema with Vasu. He received the Filmfare Award for Best Music Director – Tamil, Tamil Nadu State Film Award for Best Music Director and ITFA Best Music Director Award for Kaakha Kaakha, starring Suriya and Jyothika. This film directed by Gautham Vasudev Menon was a huge commercial success and the songs met with great critical acclaim. In its Telugu remake Gharshana two new songs apart from the Tamil version were added to suit the taste of Telugu audience. The song "Uyirin Uyire" reused as "Cheliya Cheliya" in Telugu and "Khwabon Khwabon" in Hindi had effective use of gibberish words which later became a signature element in Harris songs.

Harris once again paired up with director Jeeva on Ullam Ketkumae after 12B. The music was appreciated for its excellency and synergy with the atmosphere in and out of the movie. Director S. Shankar, noted leading director of Tamil cinema, paired up with Harris in his magnum opus Anniyan. It was the first time Shankar did not team up with A. R. Rahman. Shankar later mentioned that working with Harris was an experience. The soundtrack album received several awards including Tamil Nadu State Film Award for Best Music Director and Filmfare Award for Best Music Director – Tamil. The next film he scored was Ghajini directed by AR Murugadoss, for which he received Tamil Nadu State Film Award for Best Music Director. Critics noted that the album had "scintillating, party-hopping numbers", which resulted in a huge commercial success in audio sales; the track "Sutum Vizhi" crossed 20 million downloads and turned out to be phenomenally successful. Harris crafted a necessary classiness into Gautham Menon's blockbuster crime thriller Vettaiyaadu Vilaiyaadu starring Kamal Haasan. Gautham revealed that he shares the entire script with Harris and provides input's from his side.

"Harris and I, when we work together, we put in a lot of effort. I give him the entire script. I give him inputs. When we sat down for Vettaiyaadu Vilaiyaadu, I told him to do away with the traditional pallavi-charanam format in the "Manjal veyyil" song."

Harris once again ventured into Telugu films with a successful album Sainikudu. The music album of the film was released simultaneously in 10 chosen venues from five different countries. Gautham Menon who considers the music and background score of Harris as a major asset of his films, once again teamed up with Harris on a romantic-thriller Pachaikili Muthucharam. The soundtracks of Pachaikili Muthucharam are appraised as melancholic, lilting, mysterious, and alternatively catchy. Harris' collaboration with Jeeva continued with Unnale Unnale. The music album oozing with energy all through proved to be a cut above the rest. His next Telugu venture Munna had a good commercial reception, and the song "Manasa" fetched a Filmfare Best Singer Female award to Sadhana Sargam. With the following album Bheema, Harris continued his mettle with all the six songs. The track "Siru Parvaiyalae" used Pashto words in interludes. The album was praised for bringing up visual recapitulation from audio. Harris used a live orchestra of 84 members for the action cop film Sathyam. In 2009, Harris Jayaraj was signed in for Vikram Kumar's 24, which was to star Vikram. He was also signed in for the Malayalam film Yoddha 2, starring Mohanlal. But both films were subsequently shelved.

In Anegan, Harris's "Danga Maari Oodhari", featuring lyrics in North Madras slang become an instant chart-buster. After a hiatus of 6 years, Harris collaborated with Gautham Vasudev Menon for the action cop film Yennai Arindhaal. The soundtrack received positive reviews from critics and according to Behindwoods, it was the most played album of 2015 in Chennai radio stations.

== Live in concert ==
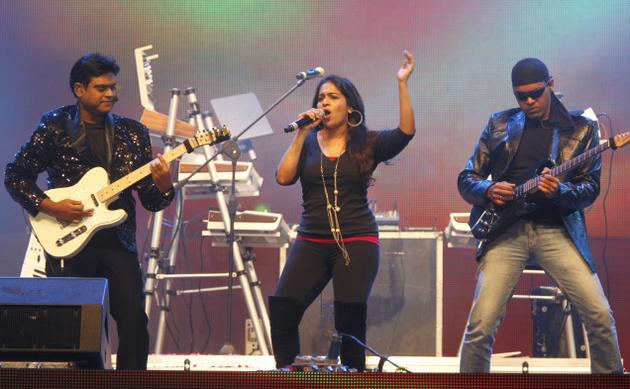
Harris performing live

In 2011, Harris announced his first musical world tour titled "Harris on the Edge". The tour featured live performance of Harris all over the world accompanied by a troupe of Tamil playback singers, including Karthik, Haricharan, Chinmayi, Tippu, Harini, Naresh Iyer, Harish Raghavendra, Krish, Aalap Raju, KK, Benny Dayal, Andrea, Suvi Suresh, Sunitha Sarathy, Srilekha Parthasarathy and Shweta Mohan and international musicians and dancers. The event was coordinated by Techfront and was directed by A. L. Vijay. The tour kick started in Chennai on 8 October 2011, and later continued in Coimbatore on 23 December 2011 and in Dubai on 4 February 2012. The whole tour was covered by Jaya TV.

== Studio H ==
Harris opened a new studio on 8 January 2017, called Studio H. The studio consists of the latest audio recording systems and technology. The first song to be composed in the studio was Halena from Iru Mugan. The S3 soundtrack was the first project entirely composed here.

== Filmography ==
=== Guest appearances ===
- 2011 Ko - in song "Aga Naga Naga" (uncredited)

== Discography ==
=== As a music director ===
Year	Tamil	Other Languages	Notes
2001	Minnale •	Rehnaa Hai Terre Dil Mein ♦ (Hindi) Cheli (Telugu)	Filmfare Award for Best Music Director – Tamil
2001	Majunu •	Majnu (Telugu)	
2001	12B •	12B (Telugu); Do Raaste 12B (Hindi)	
2002	Vetri	Vasu • (Telugu)	
2002	Samurai •	Samurai (Telugu); Samurai: Ek Yodha (Hindi)	
2003	Lesa Lesa •		
2003	Saamy •	Swamy IPS (Telugu); Policewala Gunda 3 (Hindi)	
2003	Kaakha Kaakha •	Gharshana (2004)♦ (Telugu); Force (2011)♦# (Hindi)	Filmfare Award for Best Music Director – Tamil; Tamil Nadu Award for Best Music Director; ITFA Award for Best Music Director Reused one song from Rehnaa Hai Terre Dil Mein
2004	Kovil •	Rudhrudu (Telugu)	
2004	Chellamae •	Prema Chadarangam (Telugu)	
2004	Arasatchi •		
2004	Arul •	Akhandudu (Telugu)	
2005	Thotti Jaya •#	Jalakanta (Telugu)	Reused one song from Gharshana
2005	Ullam Ketkumae •	Preminchi Choodu (Telugu)	
2005	Anniyan •	Aparichithudu (Telugu); Aparichit (2006) (Hindi)	Filmfare Award for Best Music Director – Tamil; Tamil Nadu Award for Best Music Director
2005	Ghajini •	Ghajini (Telugu)	Filmfare Special Award - South; Tamil Nadu Award for Best Music Director; ITFA Award for Best Music Director
2006	Vettaiyaadu Vilaiyaadu •	Raghavan (Telugu)	
2006	Kumaran	Sainikudu • (Telugu)	
2007	Pachaikili Muthucharam •	Dhrohi (Telugu)	
2007	Unnale Unnale •	Neevalle Neevalle (Telugu)	
2007	Vetri Thirumagan (2008)	Munna • (Telugu); Munna (Malayalam)	Reused one song from Pachakili Muthucharam
2008	Bheemaa •	Bheema (Telugu)	
2008	Satyam •	Salute (Telugu)	25th Film
2008	Dhaam Dhoom •	Rakshakudu (Telugu)	
2008	Vaaranam Aayiram •	Surya S/O Krishnan (Telugu)	Filmfare Award for Best Music Director – Tamil; Vijay Award for Best Music Director; ITFA Award for Best Music Director
2009	Ayan •	Veedokkade (Telugu)	Filmfare Award for Best Music Director – Tamil; Mirchi Music Award for Best Album – Tamil; Edison Award for Best Music Director
2009	Aadhavan •	Ghatikudu (Telugu)	Vijay Award for Best Music Director
2010	Ramcharan	Orange • (Telugu); Hai Ramcharan (Malayalam)	Mirchi Music Award for Best Album – Telugu; Reused one song from the delayed film Engeyum Kadhal
2010	Engeyum Kadhal •	Ninnu Chooste Love Vastundi (Telugu)	Vijay Music Award for Best Music Director
2011	Ko •	Rangam (Telugu)	Tamil Nadu Award for Best Music Director; Edison Award for Best Music Director
2011	7 Aum Arivu •	Seventh Sense (Telugu); 7 Aum Arivu (Malayalam); Chennai v/s China (Hindi)	
2011	Nanban •	Snehithudu (Telugu)	
2012	Oru Kal Oru Kannadi •	Ok Ok (Telugu)	
2012	Maattrraan •	Brothers (Telugu); Maattrraan (Malayalam); No 1 Judwaa (2014) (Hindi)	
2012	Thuppakki •	Thuppakki (Telugu)	SIIMA Award for Best Music Director – Tamil; The background score went on to be reused in the Bengali remake, Game (2014).
2013	Irandaam Ulagam #	Varna (Telugu)	
2013	Endrendrum Punnagai •	Chirunavvula Chirujallu (Telugu)	
2014	Idhu Kathirvelan Kadhal •	Seenu Gaadi Love Story (Telugu)	
2014	Yaan •	Nene (Telugu)	
2014	Anegan •	Anekudu (Telugu)	
2014	Nannbenda •	Good Evening (Telugu)	
2015	Yennai Arindhaal •	Yentha Vaadu Gaanie (Telugu); Satyadev IPS (Kannada)	
2015	Gethu •		
2016	Iru Mugan •	Inkokkadu (Telugu)	
2016	S3 •	Yamudu 3 (Telugu)	The background score went on to be reused in the Hindi remake, Romeo S3 (2025).
2017	Vanamagan •		50th Film
2017	Spyder •	Spyder • (Telugu) Spyder (Malayalam, Hindi, Kannada)	
2019	Dev •	Dev (Telugu)	
2019	Kaappaan •	Bandobast (Telugu); Kaappaan (Malayalam); Rowdy Rakshak (Hindi)	
2022	The Legend •	The Legend (Hindi, Kannada, Malayalam, Telugu)	
2023	Extra Ordinary Man	Extra Ordinary Man # (Telugu)	
2024	Brother •		
2026	Kadhal Reset Repeat •	Prema Reset Repeat (Telugu)	The song "Un Paarvai" is an interpolated version of "Sangathil Padatha" composed by Ilaiyaraaja from the 1982 film Auto Raja
2026		Bad Boy Karthik (Telugu) •	

Notes:

- • Indicates languages of original release.
- ♦ Indicates a film remade in another language with a different cast, retaining Harris as the composer.
- # indicates the soundtrack album has one or more bonus songs composed by a different composer.
- The movie Thotti Jaya has an additional track "Indha Ooru" composed by Yuvan Shankar Raja used only in the Tamil version of the movie. It was replaced in Telugu by the song "Ee Calcutta" composed by Harris.
- The movie Force has four songs composed by Harris. Film scoring is done by Sameer Phatarpekar with some themes having some of their melodies borrowed from the songs.

==== Upcoming ====
Year	Title	Language	Status
TBA	Dhruva Natchathiram	Tamil	Awaiting release

=== As a lyricist ===
Year	Title	Song
2011	Engeyum Kadhal	'Kulu Kulu Venpani'
2017	Singam 3	'Hey Wi Wi Wifi'

=== Music videos ===
Year	Title	Singer(s)	Lyricist
2022	Vaadi Vaadi	Ravi G, Nicholas Samuel, Sunitha Sarathy	Viveka
2023	Makka Makka	Sathyaprakash, Bamba Bakya	Pa. Vijay

== Ad jingles ==
He composed music for various television commercials including a Coca-Cola commercial featuring Vijay. In 2008, he composed for Herova? Zerova? ad campaign which Suriya initiated under the Agaram Foundation, working to help children who drop out of school early in Tamil Nadu. With the Ministry of Education in Tamil Nadu, he created a short commercial video outlining child poverty, labour and lack of education written and produced by Sivakumar and also starred Suriya, Vijay, R. Madhavan and Jyothika.

== Personal life ==
Harris is married to Suma Jayaraj, the couple have a son named Samuel Nicholas Harris and a daughter named Karen Nikitha Harris, born in 2006. Nikitha is a playback singer who made her debut through the song "Vinnil Vinmeen" for the movie Kaappaan, and won a V4U Media award in 2020.

== Awards and nominations ==
Special Honours

Year	Award
2009	Kalaimamani Award from the Government of Tamil Nadu
2015	Life Time Achievement Award from Konijeti Rosaiah, the Governor of Tamil Nadu
2015	Maestro Award from the Ritz Style Awards 2015
2019	Behindwoods Gold MIC Award for Icon of Inspiration - Setting New Precedents in Film Music
2019	Dr. M.G.R. Educational and Research Institute Honorary Doctorate of Letters

Filmfare Awards South

Year	Language	Film	Category	Result
2001	Tamil	Minnale	Best Music Director	Won
2002	Telugu	Vasu	Best Music Director	Nominated
2003	Tamil	Kaakha Kaakha	Best Music Director	Won
2003	Tamil	Saamy	Best Music Director	Nominated
2004	Telugu	Gharshana	Best Music Director	Nominated
2005	Tamil	Anniyan	Best Music Director	Won
2005	Tamil	Ghajini	Filmfare Special Award for Best Outstanding Score	Won
2006	Tamil	Vettaiyaadu Vilaiyaadu	Best Music Director	Nominated
2007	Tamil	Unnale Unnale	Best Music Director	Nominated
2007	Telugu	Munna	Best Music Director	Nominated
2008	Tamil	Vaaranam Aayiram	Best Music Director	Won
2009	Tamil	Ayan	Best Music Director	Won
2009	Tamil	Aadhavan	Best Music Director	Nominated
2010	Telugu	Orange	Best Music Director	Nominated
2011	Tamil	7 Aum Arivu	Best Music Director	Nominated
2011	Tamil	Ko	Best Music Director	Nominated
2012	Tamil	Thuppakki	Best Music Director	Nominated
2015	Tamil	Yennai Arindhaal	Best Music Director	Nominated
2016	Tamil	Iru Mugan	Best Music Director	Nominated

Tamil Nadu State Film Awards

Year	Film	Category	Result
2003	Kaakha Kaakha	Best Music Director	Won
2005	Anniyan / Ghajini	Best Music Director	Won
2011	Ko	Best Music Director	Won

South Indian International Movie Awards (SIIMA)

Year	Film	Category	Result
2012	Thuppakki	Best Music Director	Won
2015	Yennai Arindhaal	Best Music Director	Nominated
2016	Iru Mugan	Best Music Director	Nominated

Vijay Awards

- 2008: Won - Best Music Director - Vaaranam Aayiram
- 2009: Won - Best Music Director - Aadhavan
- 2008: Won - Favorite Song of the Year - "Ava Enna" from Vaaranam Aayiram
- 2011: Won - Favorite Song of the Year - "Enamo Aedho" from Ko
- 2012: Won - Favorite Song of the Year - "Google Google" from Thuppakki
- 2007: Nominated - Best Music Director - Unnale Unnale
- 2011: Nominated - Best Music Director - Engeyum Kaadhal
- 2012: Nominated - Best Music Director - Nanban
- 2011: Nominated - Best Background Score - Ko
- 2008: Nominated - Favourite Song of the Year - "Mundhinam" from Vaaranam Aayiram
- 2008: Nominated - Favourite Song of the Year - "Nenjukkul" from Vaaranam Aayiram
- 2009: Nominated - Favourite Song of the Year - "Hasili Fisili" from Aadhavan
- 2009: Nominated - Favourite Song of the Year - "Vizhi Moodi" from Ayan
- 2012: Nominated - Favourite Song of the Year - "Venaam Machan" from Oru Kal Oru Kannadi
- 2014: Nominated - Favourite Song of the Year - "Aathangara Orathil" from Yaan

Vijay Music Awards

- 2011: Won - Best Music Director - Engeyum Kaadhal
- 2011: Won - Popular Song of the Year - "Enamo Aedho" from Ko
- 2011: Won - Best Western Song - "Nangaai" from Engeyum Kaadhal

International Tamil Film Awards (ITFA)

- 2003: Won - Best Music Director - Kaakha Kaakha
- 2005: Won - Best Music Director - Ghajini
- 2008: Won - Best Music Director - Vaaranam Aayiram

Mirchi Music Awards South

- 2009: Won - Best Album of the Year - Ayan
- 2009: Won - Mirchi Listeners' Choice for Best Album - Ayan
- 2010: Won - Best Album of the Year - Orange
- 2010: Won - Mirchi Listeners' Choice for Best Album - Orange
- 2010: Won - Mirchi Listeners' Choice for Best Song - "Nenu Nuvvantu" from Orange
- 2011: Won - Best Song of the Year - "Enamo Aedho" from Ko

Edison Awards

- 2009: Won - Best Music Director - Ayan
- 2011: Won - Best Music Director - Ko
- 2015: Won - Favourite Song of the Year - "Danga Maari" from Anegan
- 2015: Nominated - Best Music Director - Anegan

MGR Sivaji Cinema Awards

- 2019 - Best Music Director - Kaappaan
- 2019 - Mellisai Mannar M.S.Viswanathan Award

Isaiaruvi Tamil Music Awards

- 2007 - Best Youthful Album of the Year - Unnale Unnale
- 2007 - Most Listened Song of the Year - "June Ponal" from Unnale Unnale
- 2008 - Best Romantic Song of the Year - "Anbe En Anbe" from Dhaam Dhoom
- 2008 - Best Album of the Year - Vaaranam Aayiram
- 2008 - Best Music Director - Vaaranam Aayiram
- 2009 - Best Romantic Song of the Year - "Vizhi Moodi Yosithal" from Ayan
- 2009 - Best Album of the Year - Aadhavan
- 2009 - Best Music Director of the Year - Aadhavan

Big FM Awards

- 2010 - Best Music Director - Orange

Big Tamil Melody Awards

- 2011 - Best Music Director - Engeyum Kaadhal
- 2011 - Best Album of the Year - Engeyum Kaadhal
- 2012 - Best Music Director - Nanban

Chennai Times Film Awards

- 2011 - Best Music Director - Ko

Maa Music Awards

- 2011 - Best Dubbing Song - "Enduko Emo" from Ko

South Scope Awards

- 2008 - Most Stylish Music Director - Dhaam Dhoom
- 2009 - Best Music Director - Ayan

Stardust Awards

- 2011: Nominated - Standout Performance by a Music Director - Force
