= Athmiya Rajan =

Indian actress

- Born: Athmiya Rajan; Taliparamba, Kannur district, Kerala, India
- Other name: Athmeeya
- Occupation: Actress
- Years active: 2009–present
- Spouse: Sanoop K Nambiar (m. 2021)

Athmiya Rajan is an Indian actress who works predominantly in Malayalam- and Tamil-language films.

== Personal life ==
Athmiya was born in Taliparamba, Kannur district, Kerala. She completed her graduation in Nursing from Shree Devi College of Nursing, Mangalore. She married Sanoop K Nambiar on 25 January 2021 at Kannur.

== Career ==
Athmiya's first film as the lead actress came in Tamil film Manam Kothi Paravai in which she played a village belle opposite Sivakarthikeyan. She then played the lead in Ranjan Pramod's Rose Guitarinaal where she essayed the role of an airline trainee, an innocent girl caught between two lovers. Malathi Rangarajan of The Hindu in a film review of Manam Kothi Paravai stated that "New-find Athmiya conveys a lot with her expressive eyes. Her role has substance, and she carries it off well". In 2014, she appeared in Pongadi Neengalum Unga Kadhalum followed by Amoeba in 2016 where she played one of the victims. Her next movie was in Tamil titled Kaaviyyan. She then portrayed lead roles Joseph (2018) and Maarconi Mathaai (2019).

== Filmography ==
Key
| † | Denotes films that have not yet been released |

List of Athmiya Rajan film credits
| Year | Title | Role(s) | Language(s) | Notes | Ref. |
|---|---|---|---|---|---|
| 2009 | Vellathooval | Reshmi | Malayalam | | |
| 2012 | Manam Kothi Paravai | Revathi | Tamil | | |
| 2013 | Rose Guitarinaal | Thara | Malayalam | | |
| 2014 | Pongadi Neengalum Unga Kadhalum | Divya | Tamil | | |
| 2016 | Amoeba | Nimisha | Malayalam | | |
| 2018 | Joseph | Stella Peter | Malayalam | | |
| 2018 | Naamam | Reena | Malayalam | | |
| 2019 | Maarconi Mathaai | Anna | Malayalam | | |
| 2019 | Kaaviyyan | Mathangai Kumaravel | Tamil | | |
| 2021 | Cold Case | Eva Maria | Malayalam | | |
| 2021 | Vellai Yaanai | Vendaam Amirtham | Tamil | | |
| 2022 | Aviyal | Nithula | Malayalam | | |
| 2022 | Puzhu | Radhika | Malayalam | | |
| 2022 | Sekher | Indu Shekar | Telugu | | |
| 2022 | John Luther | Jessy John Luther | Malayalam | | |
| 2022 | Yugi | Shalini | Tamil | Bilingual film | |
| 2022 | Adrishyam | Shalini | Malayalam | Bilingual film | |
| 2022 | Shefeekkinte Santhosham | Merlin | Malayalam | | |
| 2023 | Abyuham | Adv. Manjari | Malayalam | | |
| 2023 | Achanoru Vazha Vachu | RJ Damayanthi | Malayalam | | |
| 2025 | Rajakanyaka | Kanya | Malayalam | | |
| 2025 | Paathirathri | Anjali | Malayalam | | |

== Awards and nominations ==
List of awards and nominations received by Athmiya Rajan
| Year | Award | Category | Work | Result | Ref. |
|---|---|---|---|---|---|
| 2019 | Kerala Film Critics Association Awards | Special Jury Award | Joseph, Naamam | Won | |
