= Vellathooval =

- Directed by: I. V. Sasi
- Written by: John Paul
- Produced by: C. M. Raji
- Starring: Nithya Menen; Rejith Menon
- Cinematography: Anandakuttan
- Music by: Johnson
- Distributed by: Mulakuppadam Release
- Release date: 15 May 2009
- Country: India
- Language: Malayalam

Vellathooval is a 2009 Indian Malayalam movie by I. V. Sasi and also the last film done by him, starring Nithya Menen and Rejith Menon. It is about a crazy girl and her journey with a poor friend.

== Plot ==
Jiya, daughter of James and Lisa and Mrs Koshi's granddaughter, enjoyed her teenage years like a 'Vellathooval' (white feather). She is very conservative and has her own views. Her friend Manu's father's death, his mother marries Zachariah. Manu gets fed up with his life, as Zachariah is always drunk and tortures both Manu and his mother Sofiya. So Manu fights with him and leaves home. He thinks he might become a murderer if he stays at home. Meantime, Jiya also leaves her home, after a fight with her mother. She goes with Manu. Manu advises Jiya to go back home many times, but she didn't agree with him. Her uncle the City Police Commissioner Abi and his teams search every corner for them. At last, a drunken young college mate Williams alias Willy attacks Manu, and in order to save him, Jiya stabs Willy in the stomach. He dies in the hospital. Willy's friends and police follow Jiya and Manu. Jiya realises her mistake and surrenders herself to police and also saves Manu from Willy's friends. The movie ends showing Jiya staying in jail.

== Cast ==
- Nithya Menen as Jiya James
- Rejith Menon as Manu
- Lalu Alex as James
- Seetha as Sofiya
- Jagathy Sreekumar as Father Puthusheri
- Seema as Lizy James
- Athmiya Rajan as Reshmi
- K. B. Ganesh Kumar as City Police Commissioner Aby IPS
- Kalabhavan Shajon as ASI Shambu Sharma
- Vijayaraghavan as Zachariah
- Sithara as Sheela Aby
- Manju Satheesh as Nileena
- Sreelatha Namboothiri as Mrs. Koshy
- Ambika Mohan as Highrange Jaanu

== Production ==
I. V. Sasi wanted to make a film on teenagers without intimacy and decided to cast relative newcomers.

The lives of today's teenagers are like Vellathooval (white feathers). That feather will fly under the influence of whatever force. It will land on flowers and thorns. That white feather is present throughout the film. You will understand how the white feather is related to the story of the film if you watch the film.

— I. V. Sasi on the film's title, 2009

== Reception ==
Sify.com wrote "In all fairness, the fact that there is a storyline with some messages in the film. As you come out of the theatres, the immediate feeling will be that things could have been really different with better visuals, haunting music, and a tighter script. On simpler terms, Vellathooval would have been an okay movie, if it had come at least two decades ago!" Paresh C Palicha from Rediff.com wrote "In conclusion, Vellathooval is disappointing considering there are veterans like director I V Sasi and writer John Paul associated with it."
