= Rose Guitarinaal =

- Directed by: Ranjan Pramod
- Written by: Ranjan Pramod
- Produced by: Maha Subair
- Starring: Richard Joy Thomas; Athmiya Rajan; Manesh Kumar; Rejith Menon; Jagadish
- Cinematography: Pappu
- Edited by: Sajit Unnikrishnan
- Music by: Shahabaz Aman
- Production companies: Varnchitra Big Screen; Colour Pencil Films
- Distributed by: Varnachitra Release
- Release date: 1 March 2013
- Country: India
- Language: Malayalam

Rose Guitarinaal is a 2013 Indian romantic musical written and directed by Ranjan Pramod. The film features Richard Joy Thomas, Athmiya Rajan, Manu and Rejith Menon in lead roles, and was produced by Maha Subair under the banner of Varnachitra Big Screen in association with Colour Pencil Films. The film was released on 1 March 2013.

== Plot ==
Thara, who is training to be an air hostess, hails from a middle-class family. Her small happy world comprises her father and the pet dog Tuttu. She also has a childhood friend whom she affectionately calls Appu. Appu takes her to and from work in his two wheeler. The story takes a twist when the CEO of her airline company, Shyam, takes an interest in her. Their new closeness annoys Appu and he begins moving away from her. How Tara deals with this emotional love triangle comprises the plot.

== Cast ==
- Richard Joy Thomas as Shyam
- Athmiya Rajan as Thara
- Manesh Kumar as Joe
- Rejith Menon as Binoy
- Jagadish as Thara's father
- Liimal G Padath as Arjun
- Nisha as Sherin
- Joy Mathew as Joe's father
- Thara Kalyan as Joe's mother
- Kiran Raj as Amar

== Reception ==
A critic from Rediff.com wrote that "Overall, Rose Guitarinaal is devoid of charm and offers nothing to entice the viewer".
