= ITFA Best Music Director Award =

The ITFA Best Music Director Award is given by the state government as part of its annual International Tamil Film Awards for Tamil (Kollywood) films. The award was first given in 2003.

== The list ==
Here is a list of the award winners and the films for which they won.

Year	Music director	Film
2011	Devi Sri Prasad	Vengai
2008	Harris Jayaraj	Vaaranam Aayiram
2005	Harris Jayaraj	Ghajini
2003	Harris Jayaraj	Kaakha Kaakha
2002	Bharadwaj	Roja Kootam

== See also ==
- Tamil cinema
- Cinema of India
