= Cicada (2024 film) =

Upcoming Indian survival thriller film

- Theatrical release poster
- Directed by: Sreejith Edavana
- Written by: Sreejith Edavana
- Produced by: Vandana Menon, Gopakumar P
- Starring: Rajith Menon; Gayathri Mayura; Jaise Jose
- Cinematography: Naveen Raj
- Music by: Sreejith Edavana
- Production companies: Theerna Films and Entertainment
- Release date: 9 August 2024
- Country: India
- Language: Malayalam

Cicada is a 2024 Indian Malayalam survival thriller film written and directed by Sreejith Edavana. Meghana Raj Sarja and Prajwal Devaraj announced the movie in Kannada. The film stars Rajith Menon, Gayathri Mayura, and Jaise Jose. The film was released on 9 August 2024.

== Cast ==
- Rajith Menon
- Gayathri Mayura
- Jaise Jose
- Shalil Kallur
- Arun K Michael
- Merlin Reena
- Praveen Raveendran
- Adeline Simon Chittilappilly
- Stephy Santhu
- Mathayichan

== Production ==
The film is produced by Vandana Menon and Gopakumar P under the banner of Theerna Films and Entertainment. Srinath Ramachandran, Kevin Fernandez, Salman Faris, Gauri Timbal, Praveen Ravindran and others are co-producers.

== Music ==
The film's music is composed by Sreejith Edavana, known for his work on Thirimali, Shikari Shambu, and Madhura Naranga, among others. The movie features six tracks in four language.
