= E (2006 film) =

- Poster
- Directed by: S. P. Jhananathan
- Screenplay by: N. Kalyanakrishnan
- Story by: S. P. Jhananathan
- Dialogues by: S. P. Jhananathan
- Produced by: R. B. Choudary
- Starring: Jiiva; Nayanthara; Ashish Vidyarthi; Pasupathy
- Cinematography: N. K. Ekambaram
- Edited by: N. Ganesh Kumar; V. T. Vijayan (editing supervisor)
- Music by: Srikanth Deva
- Production company: Super Good Films
- Release date: 20 October 2006
- Running time: 156 minutes
- Country: India
- Language: Tamil

E (transl. The Fly) is a 2006 Indian Tamil-language action thriller film directed by S. P. Jhananathan. The film stars Jiiva and Nayanthara, while Ashish Vidyarthi, Pasupathy and Karunas played supporting roles. The music is composed by director Srikanth Deva. The film was released on 21 October 2006. The story is loosely based on the 2001 John le Carré novel The Constant Gardener.

== Plot ==
Easwaran alias E is an orphan brought up in the musty, teeming slums of Chennai by an old woman. For him, money is God. He comes across Jothy, a bar dancer who settles down in the same locality. After a few encounters, they get acquainted with each other. E's simple ways attract Jothy. Coming to know of E's past, Jothy tries desperately to correct his ways and set him on the right path. Meanwhile, Dr. Ramakrishnan takes up the task of testing a medicine devised by a foreign company, which may come handy in killing people in thousands, especially during times of war. Ramakrishnan chooses Jothy's sister, Ayisha, and E's grandmother as specimens for the test. He cashes in on the ignorance of the slum dwellers. Things take a turn when E rescues Ramakrishnan from a murder bid by Nellai Mani. A sequence of events brings Nellai Mani and E together. Without knowing Nellai Mani's motive, E hides him in a secret place and decides to hand him over to Ramakrishnan for a huge sum. Slowly, E gets attracted by Nellai Mani's good ways. Through him, E discovers Ramakrishnan's ulterior motives. Nellai Mani, a revolutionary fighting for a cause, tries to bring about a change in E's heart. Succeeding in his attempt, Nellai Mani lays down his life, leaving E to complete his task. The rest is all about how E puts an end to Ramakrishnan and his evil ways.

== Cast ==
- Jiiva as Easwaran (E)
- Nayanthara as Jothy
- Ashish Vidyarthi as Dr. Ramakrishnan
- Pasupathy as Nellai Mani
- Karunas as Tony
- Rajesh
- Ajay Rathnam as a police officer
- Cheranraj as SI
- Aryan
- Suruli Manohar as the police constable
- Scissor Manohar
- Vichu as Settu
- Chaams as Ganeshan
- Baby Ashika as Ayisha
- Laksha as Nurse Lilly
- Sana Khan (special appearance in the song "Theepori Parakkum")
- Dinesh as Parthiban

== Production ==
The film was launched on 15 September 2005 at AVM Studios, Chennai. A fight scene was picturised on the railway tracks over the Palar River. The entire film was shot in Chennai.

== Soundtrack ==
The music was composed by Srikanth Deva and released by Star Music. Some of the lyrics of a song were changed after Nayanthara objected to them. The album was negatively reviewed by Shyam Balasubramanian of Rediff.com.

Track listing
No.	Title	Lyrics	Singer(s)	Length
1.	"Theepori Parakkum"	Ponadiyaan	Tippu	5:02
2.	"Vavaa Central"	Puliyanthoppu Pazhani	Puliyanthoppu Pazhani	2:38
3.	"Kadhal Enbathu"	Na. Muthukumar	Hariharan	4:28
4.	"Thirundhividu"	Puliyanthoppu Pazhani	Puliyanthoppu Pazhani	1:07
5.	"Chennai Maanagaram"	Puliyanthoppu Pazhani	Puliyanthoppu Pazhani	0:37
6.	"Vaaradhu Pol"	Parinaman	K. J. Yesudas	3:55
7.	"Ezhu Kurukku"	Puliyanthoppu Pazhani	Puliyanthoppu Pazhani	0:46
8.	"Orey Murai"	Viveka	Sukhwinder Singh, Sangeetha, Vaishali	4:55
9.	"Muthuna Moonjiku"	Puliyanthoppu Pazhani	Puliyanthoppu Pazhani	1:24
10.	"Kalakala Kalai"	Snehan	Ranjith, Kalpana, Sowmya Raoh	4:56
Total length:				29:48

== Release and reception ==
E was released on 21 October 2006 during Diwali. Malini Mannath of Chennai Online wrote "If the director here had focused more on the issue he was tackling, and not got distracted by commercial trappings and compromises, 'E..' would have turned out to be a better product". Malathi Rangarajan of The Hindu wrote, "It is apparent that maker Jhananathan of the national award-winning [Iyarkai] has worked hard on a new thought. That in itself warrants much credit". Atishay Abbhi of Rediff.com wrote, "Jeeva's hard-hitting performance is the sole saving grace. This is one of the few reasons why one can spend money on this movie".

Lajjavathi of Kalki praised the acting of Jeeva, Nayanthara and other actors while also praised music, cinematography and art direction and concluded saying Jananathan has worked hard to make people understand the socially responsible film. Cinesouth wrote, "Director S P Jananathan will get his due credit for not treating cinema as an entertainment but for communicating something very important". Sify wrote, "E is a bold new cinema with some great performance from its lead characters especially Jeeva who has come out with a powerhouse performance [...] On the downside the film lacks entertainment and the second half drags". Pasupathy won the Tamil Nadu State Film Award for Best Villain.
