= Rajith Menon =

Indian actor

- Born: Rajith C Ravindranadhan; 5 March 1988 (age 38)
- Other name: Rajith Menon
- Years active: 2007 – present
- Spouse: Sruthi Mohan (m.2018)
- Parent(s): Ravindranadhan; Premalatha

Rajith CR, better known as Rajith Menon, is an Indian actor and director who works in Malayalam and Tamil films. He made his acting debut in the Malayalam film Goal, in Tamil through Ninaithathu Yaaro and in Telugu through Dhamki.

== Personal life ==
Rajith Menon attended Abu Dhabi Model School, and earned a bachelor's degree in Mechanical engineering at St. Joseph's College of Engineering in Chennai. He also has an MBA in Human Resources from Sikkim Manipal University. He is married to Dr. Sruthi Mohan and they have a daughter named Malhara.

== Direction ==
He directed the music video "Love Policy" which featured Aju Varghese and Shritha Sivadas, and was recorded by Sony Music. This music video had music composed by Sreejith-Saachin and was vocals by Sooraj Santhosh and Remya Nambeesan. It went on to become one of the most top trending music videos in YouTube.

His second music video was dedicated to motherhood titled "Anbendraale Amma" in Tamil and "With Love Maa" in Hindi. It featured Zarina Wahab and was recorded by Times Music. Renjith Unni composed the music and Shweta Mohan and Saptaparna Chakraborty provided the vocals. The song went on to become viral and was praised for its theme and direction.

Rajith directed a Tamil short film titled My Death Certificate which won many awards and accolades at Indian and International film festivals. Besides filmmaking, he is the managing director of an ad agency called Arvy Productions.

== Awards ==
- Best Newcomer - Asianet Awards
- Best New Talent - Chennai Film Awards
- Best Director Award for his short film "My Death Certificate" in over 50 plus national and international film festivals.

== Filmography ==
- All films are in Malayalam, unless otherwise noted.

Year	Film	Role	Notes
2007	Goal	Sam Issac	Debut film
2009	Orkkuka Vallappozhum	Teen Sethumadhavan	
2009	Vellathooval	Manu	
2010
2010	Janakan	Ambareesh	
2010	Nilavu	Deepu	
2010	Holidays	Soumitran	
2011	Sevenes	Sharath	
2011	Doctor Love	Martin	
2011	Innanu Aa Kalyanam	Karthik	
2012	Navagatharkku Swagatham	Prasanth	
2012	Chapters	Shyam	Credited as Rejath Menon
2013	My Fan Ramu	Himself	Cameo appearance
2013	Rose Guitarinaal	Binoy	
2013	Up & Down: Mukalil Oralundu	Suraj	
2013	Abhiyum Njanum	fake Sohan Menon	
2013	Tourist Home		
2013	Daivathinte Swantham Cleetus	Alex	
2014	Ninaithathu Yaaro	Mohan	Tamil film
2019	Embiran	Priyan	Tamil film
2019	Namma Veettu Pillai		Tamil film
2021	Dhamki		Telugu film
2024	Cicada		
2025	Vallamai		Tamil film
2025	J.S.K – Janaki V v/s State of Kerala	Venkat	
