= Asthram (2025 film) =

2025 Tamil crime thriller film by Aravind Rajagopal

- Theatrical release poster
- Directed by: Aravind Rajagopal
- Written by: Jegan M. S
- Produced by: DSM Dhana Shanmugamani
- Starring: Shaam; Niranjani
- Cinematography: Kalyan Venkatraman
- Edited by: Bhoopathy Vedhagiri
- Music by: K.S. Sundaramurthy
- Production company: Best Movies
- Distributed by: Five Star Company
- Release date: 21 March 2025
- Running time: 108 minutes
- Country: India
- Language: Tamil

Asthram is a 2025 Indian Tamil-language crime thriller film directed by debutant Aravind Rajagopal and co-written along with Jegan M. S, starring Shaam and Niranjani in the lead roles. The film is produced by DSM Dhana Shanmugamani under Best Movies having Nizhalgal Ravi, Aroul D Shankar, Jeeva Ravi, Ranjith DSM and others in supporting roles. Asthram was released in theatres on 21 March 2025.

== Plot ==
An inspector on medical leave investigates a pattern of public suicides where victims stab themselves. The case connects to chess players, an ancient book on ritual suicide, and a mysterious figure orchestrating the deaths from the shadows.

== Cast ==
- Shaam as Inspector Akilan
- Niranjani as Priya
- Nizhalgal Ravi as Rudhran
- Aroul D Shankar as SP Rajavelu
- Jeeva Ravi as James
- Ranjith DSM as Vijay
- Videsh Anand as Martin

== Production ==
In early February 2024, through a first look poster, actor Shaam's next project in the lead role titled Asthram was released. The film is directed by debutant Aravind Rajagopal and co-directed Jegan M. S and produced by DSM Dhana Shanmugamani under Best Movies. The film also stars Nizhalgal Ravi, Aroul D Shankar, Jeeva Ravi, Ranjith DSM and others in supporting roles. The technical team consists of Kalyan Venkataraman as the cinematographer, Boopathy as the editor and K.S Sundaramurthy as the music composer.

Principal photography took place for 30 days across Chennai and Kodaikanal and got completed before the announcement.

== Release ==
=== Theatrical ===
Asthram released in theatres on 21 March 2025. The film was postponed from 7 March 2025 due to inadequate theatre availability as multiple films were releasing on that date. Earlier it was scheduled for 21 February 2025 and then pushed to 28 February 2025. Five Star Company acquired the theatrical distribution rights of the film in Tamil Nadu.

=== Home media ===
Asthram premiered on Aha Tamil on 9 May 2025.

== Critical reception ==
A critic of Dinamalar rated the film 3/5. Abhinav Subramanian of The Times of India gave 2/5 stars and wrote "Shaam approaches Akilan with dedication, even as the character remains thinly written. Nira gets screen time as his media-savvy wife, yet contributes only domestic filler. Nizhalgal Ravi brings a measured presence to his role. Asthram leaves its audience in check, with no desire for a rematch." Sreejith Mullappily of Cinema Express gave 1.5/5 stars and wrote "The film huffs and puffs its way to a contrived ending, only to later deliver an anticlimactic wink at the camera, a sequel bait. Suffice it to say, this asthram misses the target more than an archer would even with a blindfold from miles apart."
