= N. K. Ekambaram =

Indian film cinematographer

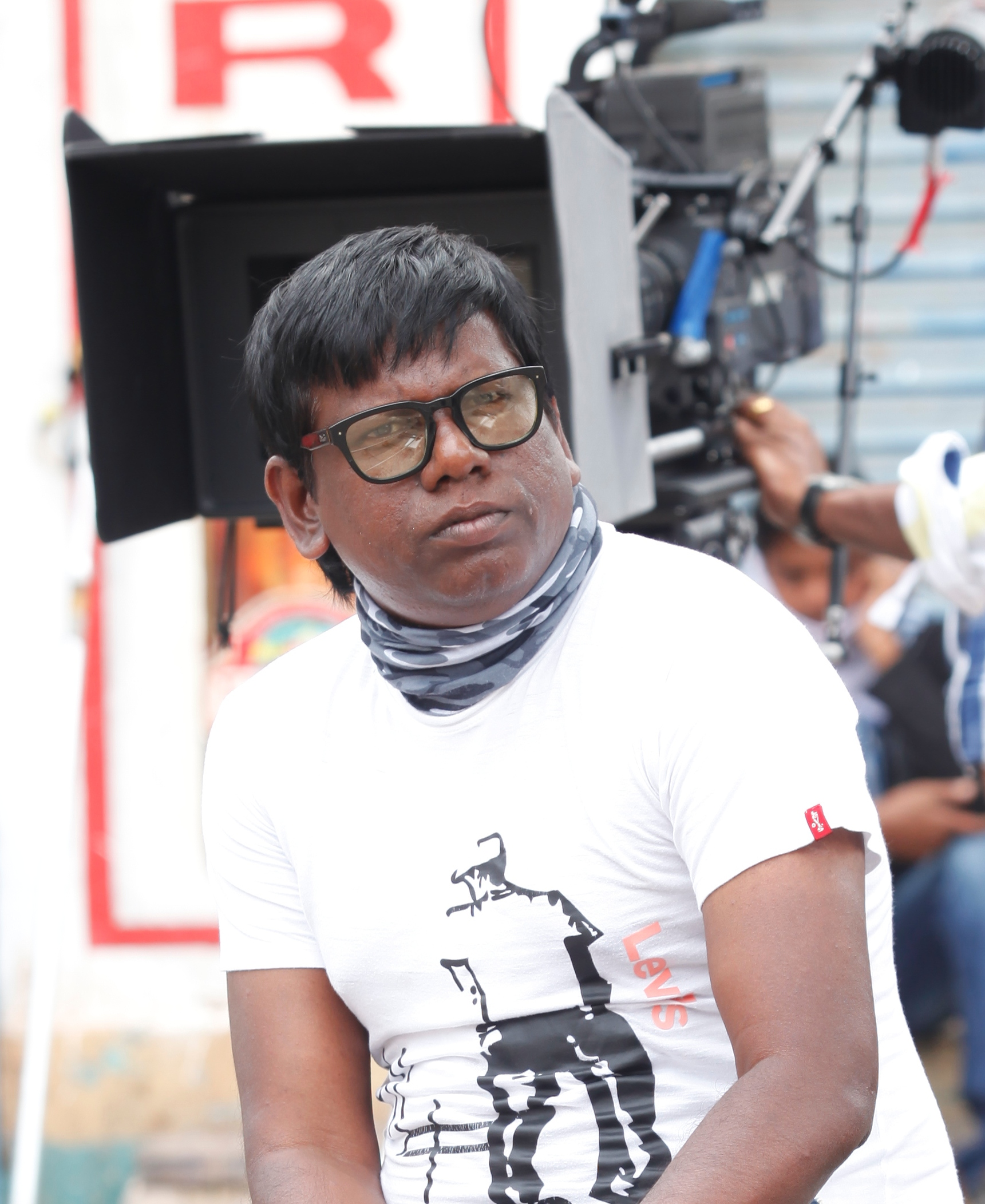
N. K. Ekambaram Portrait

N. K. Ekambaram is an Indian cinematographer who works in Tamil, Malayalam, Telugu and Hindi film industries. He studied Film and Television Institute of Tamil Nadu. He worked as an assistant cinematographer to Jeeva.

== Filmography ==
Year	Title	Language	Notes
2002	Thamizhan	Tamil	
2003	Iyarkai	Tamil	
2003	Neeku Nenu Naaku Nuvvu	Telugu	
2004	Vettam	Malayalam	
2006	Kalvanin Kadhali	Tamil	
2006	E	Tamil	
2007	Pori	Tamil	
2009	Kanthaswamy	Tamil	
2009	De Dana Dan	Hindi	
2010	Drona	Malayalam	
2010	Sura	Tamil	
2011	Kaavalan	Tamil	
2013	Zila Ghaziabad	Hindi	
2013	Shortcut Romeo	Hindi	
2013	Policegiri	Hindi	
2015	Kaaval	Tamil	
2015	Purampokku	Tamil	
2016	Oppam	Malayalam	
2017	Thondan	Tamil	
2017	Villain	Malayalam	
2018	Nimir	Tamil	
2019	Pettikadai	Tamil	
2019	Aruvam	Tamil	
2020	Naadodigal 2	Tamil	
2020	Ka Pae Ranasingam	Tamil	
2021	Hungama 2	Hindi	
2021	Navarasa	Tamil	Web series on Netflix
2021	Vinodhaya Sitham	Tamil	
2021	Sivaranjiniyum Innum Sila Pengalum	Tamil	
2022	Kombu Vatcha Singamda	Tamil	
2023	Karumegangal Kalaigindrana	Tamil	
2024	Yezhu Kadal Yezhu Malai	Tamil	
2024	Singappenney	Tamil	
2025	Paranthu Po	Tamil	
