= Ullam Ketkumae =

Ullam Ketkumae...
- DVD Cover
- Directed by: Jeeva
- Written by: Jeeva
- Dialogues by: Sujatha
- Produced by: Mahadevan Ganesh; Usha Venkatramani
- Starring: Shaam; Arya; Laila; Asin; Pooja
- Cinematography: Jeeva
- Edited by: V. T. Vijayan
- Music by: Harris Jayaraj
- Production companies: G. V. Films; One Word Media Network Infotainment Ltd.
- Distributed by: AP International; Ayngaran International
- Release date: 3 June 2005
- Running time: 136 minutes
- Country: India
- Language: Tamil

Ullam Ketkumae... (transl. The heart wants more) is a 2005 Tamil-language musical coming of age film written, cinematographed and directed by Jeeva, with dialogues by Sujatha. The film stars Shaam, Arya, Laila, Asin and Pooja as five college students. The film's score and soundtrack are composed by Harris Jayaraj, while Vairamuthu penned the lyrics for the songs. The film tells the reunion of five friends who were together at college and exploring their relationships during the years.

The film released after several delays in 2005 and went on to win critical and commercial success. The film marked the first successful film for Jeeva and Shaam, while Arya and Asin received several film offers after the release of the film.

== Plot ==
The film is about a group of five college friends — Shyam, Emaan, Pooja, Priya and Irene. The friends gather for Emaan's wedding, years after everyone has parted ways.

The film starts with Pooja leaving the United States to go to Indian cricketer and her friend Emaan's wedding. Meanwhile, back in India, everyone else is helping Emaan with the preparations for his wedding and catching up with their long-lost college friends. The movie goes through series of flashbacks of old memories during their college days. Emaan and Irene meet for the first time after years. It turns out that they were once in love during their college days, but Irene, who is from an unstable family, decides to part ways with Emaan after he loses focus on his longtime goal of becoming a successful cricketer.

Another flashback occurs when Shyam gets reminded of Pooja, a fun-loving tomboyish and naive girl who is best friends with him. Shyam realizes that he is in love with Priya, but on the other hand, Pooja realizes that she is falling for Shyam. Shyam and Pooja had respectively decided to propose their love interests on the coming Valentine's Day, but on that day, Pooja learns beforehand that Shyam is in love with Priya instead. Heartbroken by what she has just learned, she decides to keep her love for him a secret. When Shyam proposes to Priya, she rejects his love as she believes in a more traditional approach towards finding a life partner. She reveals to him that she will be getting married, right after their graduation, to the man of her parents' choice. Pooja eventually goes to the US for her higher studies and settles down there. Shyam has also tried to move on since then and becomes a fashion designer.

The film transitions back to the present on Emaan's wedding day. Everyone attends his wedding as Pooja finally arrives. She is no longer the same girl she was back then as she is much more mature now and not as tomboyish as she was back then. Over sometime, Shyam has come to realize that he missed Pooja's presence and is much fond of her now. He realizes that he had failed to appreciate her all those times when she was there with him. The day after Emaan's wedding, Pooja leaves to catch her flight back to USA. Right before her departure, she decides to pass Shyam the Valentine's Day card that she had wanted to hand him during their college days and reveals her love for him, Pathchu notices the cards and get into serious discussion with Emaan and others. Shyam realizes that Pooja is the one who was meant to be for him and not Priya. Shyam runs towards check in gate and witnesses the flight take off, but Pooja waits there and asks Shyam whether he loves her. The movie ends with Shyam accepting Pooja's love for him.

== Cast ==
- Shaam as Shyam
- Arya as Emaan
- Laila as Pooja
- Asin as Priya
- Pooja as Irene
- Murali as Pooja's father
- Minister Srinath as Pathchu
- Pyramid Natarajan as Priya's father
- K.P.A.C. Lalitha as Emaan's mother
- Revathi Sankaran as Priya's mother
- Japan Kumar as a college student
- Kaveri Lalchand as Irene's mother
- Rajiv Choudary (uncredited) as Irene's father
- Krishnamachari Srikkanth (uncredited) as himself
- Hemanth Kumar (uncredited) as a college student
- Raju Sundaram as a singer in the song "Mazhai Mazhai"

== Production ==
=== Development and casting ===
I have done 15 films in Tamil. My favorite film is 'Ullam Kettkumae More'. I enjoyed doing the character very much. I enjoyed every moment of the shooting.

— Laila in an interview, 2005

In April 2002, it was reported that Shaam and Richa Pallod were going to team up with director Jeeva, who had launched Shaam in 12B (2001), for a college love story titled Pepsi. Susi Ganesan had appealed for the title Pepsi for a film; however, since the title Pepsi was registered by Jeeva, Ganesan ended up renaming his film Five Star (2002). The title Pepsi had stemmed from the first letter from the names of the five friends — Priya, Emaan, Pooja, Shyam and Irene. The film was later renamed Ullam Ketkumae, taking part of the soft drink brand Pepsi's then slogan in Tamil Nadu, Ullam Ketkumae More, translated from Yeh Dil Maange More.

Laila was reported to be the lead heroine among the cast. Asin signed the film and the film was meant to mark her début in Tamil films. This was the second film that Asin worked on after the Malayalam film Narendran Makan Jayakanthan Vaka (2001). While working as a software engineer, Jamshad was approached by Jeeva to audition for the film in 2003 after Jeeva spotted him walking in his neighbourhood. Jeeva gave Jamshad the stage name of Arya for this film. Pooja was also signed on to make her début. Srinath, who worked as an assistant director under Jeeva in 12B, was cast in this film as Shaam and Arya's friend. Rajesh dubbed for Malayalam actor Murali in the film. Model Hemanth Kumar was cast as a college student.

=== Filming ===
Art director Thota Tharani created a college campus for the film to be shot in, with his work drawing appreciation. A scene featuring an inter college day cultural had 100 students from various states take part in the shooting while decorations and a podium were put up for a marriage scene in Taj Connemara hotel. Raju Sundaram choreographed five songs including a song shot at hot water springs in New Zealand.

The film went through production hell, with three years being spent on the announcement till release. The film was supposed to be the debut film of Arya, Asin, and Pooja. The delay of the film enabled the lead actors to gain popularity with other releases. Despite giving indications that the film would release after delays on 14 April 2004 it was further pushed back due to financial issues. In May 2005, the Supreme Court finally cleared the decks for the release, as earlier the Madras High court by a 25 February order appointed "Joint Receivers" for the film, which was objected by Prasad Labs who had gone to Supreme Court. It was agreed that the collections from the film will be received by "joint receivers" who will pay Prasad Labs for 72 prints of the film.

== Music ==
The music and background score were composed by Harris Jayaraj and became popular upon release.

Ullam Ketkumae

Soundtrack album by Harris Jayaraj
- Released: 22 April 2005
- Recorded: 2005
- Genre: Feature film soundtrack
- Length: 27:28
- Language: Tamil
- Labels: Hit Musics; Vega Music; Bayshore; Divo; Think Music
- Producer: Harris Jayaraj

Harris Jayaraj chronology
Thotti Jaya (2005)	Ullam Ketkumae (2005)	Anniyan (2005)

Ullam Ketkumae
No.	Title	Lyrics	Singer(s)	Length
1.	"Ennai Pandhada"	Vairamuthu	Srinivas, Srimathumitha	4:52
2.	"Kanavugal"	Pa. Vijay	Karthik, Tippu, O. S. Arun, Premji Amaran, Febi Mani	5:33
3.	"O Maname"	Vairamuthu	Hariharan	4:55
4.	"Mazhai Mazhai"	Vairamuthu	P. Unnikrishnan, Harini	4:55
5.	"Dho Dho"	Vairamuthu	Franko, KK	5:45
6.	"Lieko Laima"	Pa. Vijay	Ranjith	1:28
Total length:				27:28

All tracks are written by Bhuvanachandra.

Preminchi Choodu
No.	Title	Singer(s)	Length
1.	"Enno Janmala Bandham"	Srinivas, Saindhavi	4:53
2.	"Enno Ennenno Kalale"	Karthik, Premji Amaran, Febi Mani, Pop Shalini, Suchitra	5:34
3.	"O Manasa"	Madhu Balakrishnan	4:54
4.	"Shodhinchuko"	P. Unnikrishnan, Harini	4:55
5.	"Sie Sie Sie"	Franko, KK	5:49
6.	"Lieko Laima"	Ranjith	1:58
Total length:			28:03

== Release ==
Ullam Ketkumae was released on 3 June 2005 and became a commercial success at the box office with pundits describing the film as a "super hit". The film took a 90 percent opening in four Chennai screens with large collections reported at the Devi theatre in Chennai in the opening weekend. The film opened at number two at the Chennai box office despite stiff competition, just below the Rajinikanth starrer Chandramukhi. This was the first commercially successful film for both Jeeva and Shaam after their previous venture 12B did not fare as well.

=== Critical reception ===
A critic from Sify gave the film a verdict of above average and stated that "On the whole, Jeeva has been successful to make an entertainer with a very good story. Everything, from the choice of lead actors, their lines and gestures, interpersed with perfect song-n-dance is perfectly coordinated". Malini Mannath of Chennai Online opined that Laila's performance was the "surprise packet" and that "Jeeva's camera provides some colourful visuals and together with Harris Jairaj's peppy numbers adds to the film's entertainment value. Ullam Kelkumae is an urban Autograph, worth a watch". Visual Dasan of Kalki praised Jeeva's realistic characters, the acting of the cast, and Harris Jayaraj's music. He said the film can be rewatched for the feelings it induces.

== Legacy ==
Ullam Ketkumae was notably one of the first Tamil films in the reunion genre. Several news websites including The Times of India and The New Indian Express listed this film as one to watch on Friendship Day along with several other films including Thalapathi (1991), Kadhal Desam (1996), Friends (2001), Chennai 600028 (2007), Naadodigal (2009), and Nanban (2012).

The success of the film brought a series of offers for Shaam, whose career was struggling prior to release. The success of the film prompted ABCD, another film starring Shaam, to release two months later. Arya and Asin were able to consolidate their positions as rising actors.
