= Jeeva (director) =

Indian film director

- Born: 21 September 1963; Thiruthuraipoondi, Thiruvarur, Tamil Nadu, India
- Died: 26 June 2007 (aged 43); Saint Petersburg, Russia
- Occupations: Director of Photography, Film director, Screenwriter
- Years active: 1991–2007
- Spouse: Anees Tanveer
- Children: 2

Jeeva (21 September 1963 – 26 June 2007) was an Indian filmmaker, cinematographer and film director in Tamil, Hindi and Malayalam-language cinema. He was an established cinematographer in the late 1990s and early 2000s.

== Career ==
Jeeva started his career assisting cinematographer P. C. Sreeram in films such as Nayakan, Agni Natchathiram, Apoorva Sagodharargal, Idhaya Thamarai, Gopura Vasalile and Meera. He became an independent cinematographer in Priyadarshan's Malayalam film Abhimanyu (1991) starring Mohanlal and went on to film over 20 films including his own directorials. He was director Shankar's usual cinematographer in his early films such as Gentleman (1993), Kaadhalan (1994) and Indian (1996). Jeeva's work in Shankar's Kaadhalan fetched him the Tamil Nadu State Film Award for Best Cinematographer. He had also collaborated several times with director Priyadarshan.

Three of the four completed films he directed, namely 12B (2001), Ullam Ketkumae (2005) and Unnale Unnale (2007), have become blockbusters (except for Run (2004). He died after suffering acute cardiac arrest in Russia on 26 June 2007 at the age of 43. At the time of his death, he was busy with the final schedule of his latest film, Dhaam Dhoom (2008).

== Personal life ==
Jeeva was married to costume designer Anees Tanveer with whom he has two children.

== Death ==
Jeeva died in Saint Petersburg, Russia, following a cardiac arrest while film shooting of Dhaam Dhoom.

== Filmography ==
=== As film director and cinematographer ===
Year	Film	Credited as		Language	Notes
Year	Film	Director	Cinematographer	Language	Notes
1991	Abhimanyu		Yes	Malayalam	
1993	Gentleman		Yes	Tamil	
1994	The Gentleman		Yes	Hindi	
1994	Kaadhalan		Yes	Tamil	
1995	Aasai		Yes	Tamil	
1996	Indian		Yes	Tamil	
1997	Ullaasam		Yes	Tamil	
1997	Chandralekha		Yes	Malayalam	
1998	Zor		Yes	Hindi	
1999	Vaalee		Yes	Tamil	
2000	Kushi		Yes	Tamil	
2000	Snegithiye		Yes	Tamil	
2000	Hera Pheri		Yes	Hindi	
2001	12B	Yes	Yes	Tamil	Also voiceover at end of film
2001	Yeh Teraa Ghar Yeh Meraa Ghar		Yes	Hindi	
2002	Run		Yes	Tamil	
2004	Run	Yes	Yes	Hindi	Remake of the 2002 film
2004	Hulchul		Yes	Hindi	
2005	Sandakozhi		Yes	Tamil	
2005	Sachien		Yes	Tamil	
2005	Ullam Ketkumae	Yes	Yes	Tamil	
2006	Bhagam Bhag		Yes	Hindi	
2007	Unnale Unnale	Yes	Yes	Tamil	
2007	Raakilipattu		Yes	Malayalam	
2008	Dhaam Dhoom	Yes	Yes	Tamil	Posthumously released film

As Still Photographer

- Bombay (1995)

== Legacy ==
Actors, cinematographers and directors such as Srinath, Arjun Jena, N. K. Ekambaram, Gavemic U. Ary, Jeeva Shankar, K. A. Shakthivel, R. B. Gurudev, and G. K. Manigandan had worked as assistant, associate directors and assistant cinematographers to him.
