= 12B =

2001 film by Jeeva

- Poster
- Directed by: Jeeva
- Written by: Jeeva
- Screenplay by: K. Bhagyaraj
- Based on: Sliding Doors
- Produced by: Vikram Singh
- Starring: Shaam; Simran; Jyothika; Suniel Shetty
- Cinematography: Jeeva
- Edited by: B. Lenin; V. T. Vijayan
- Music by: Harris Jayaraj
- Production company: Film Works
- Distributed by: Media Dreams
- Release date: 28 September 2001
- Running time: 149 minutes
- Country: India
- Language: Tamil

12B is a 2001 Indian Tamil-language romantic comedy drama film written, cinematographed and directed by Jeeva; it is his directorial debut. The film stars Shaam in his debut with Simran and Jyothika in lead roles. Hindi actors Suniel Shetty and Moon Moon Sen play supporting roles with the former making a cameo appearance. The music was composed by Harris Jayaraj, with editing by B. Lenin and V. T. Vijayan.

12B is an unofficial remake of the 1998 British-American romantic drama film Sliding Doors. The film introduced the use of dual narrative to Tamil cinema; it depicts events in a man's life that depend on whether he catches a bus or not. The film gained attention for its casting of Simran and Jyothika, who were two of the leading female actors of Tamil cinema; it is also the first Tamil film in which Shetty and Sen appear. The film was released on 28 September 2001 and performed average at the box office. Critics praised the new concept but criticised the narrative, which they found confusing.

== Plot ==
One morning, Shakthivel alias Shakthi leaves his house for a job interview when he sees a woman, Jyothika alias Jo, walking down the street. Shakthi is distracted by Jo and begins to follow her. He misses his bus and gets mugged. The film then pauses as a voice-over tells the audience they are about to examine the impact of missing the bus on Shakthi's life.

Shakthi who catches the bus arrives on time for the job interview and is offered the job of a bank manager, and a young colleague Priya falls in love with him. Shakthi, however, is still in love with Jo but something repeatedly prevents him from meeting her. The obstacle turns out to be his alternate self. Shakthi the bank manager is well-off in life but is miserable because he cannot win the affections of Jo.

The Shakthi who missed the bus arrives late at the interview and is thrown out. On his way home, he passes by a junkyard, where he meets his friend Madhan, who gives him a job as a mechanic. The next day, while crossing the street, he sees Jo and again follows her. He gains her attention and they begin a relationship. One day, Jo's uncle Aravind visits, and it is revealed he too is in love with Jo and wants to marry her, much to Jo's dismay.

Due to a misunderstanding, Jo and Shakthi the mechanic separate. Priya expresses her love for the Shakthi the bank manager who, while reciprocating his love for Priya, has an accident. At the same moment, Shakthi the mechanic is also seriously hurt in the same accident while he tries to repair his relationship with Jo. Both Shakthis are admitted to the hospital. While Priya is crying over the death of Shakthi the bank manager, she glimpses Shakthi the mechanic making up with Jo. The film ends with a voice-over concluding the film.

== Cast ==
- Sunil Shetty as R. Aravind (special appearance)
- Shaam as Shakthivel a.k.a. Shakthi
- Simran as Priya
- Jyothika as S. Jyothika a.k.a. Jo / 12B
- Vivek as Madhan
- Moonmoon Sen as Sulo
- Shanti Williams as Shakti's mother
- R. Sundaramoorthy as Sadasivam
- Mayilsamy as Citizen
- Master Udayaraj as Wall Tube
- Srinath as Bolt
- Lakshmikanthan as Nataraj a.k.a. Nut
- K. P. Mohan as Mohan
- Vaishnavi as Shakti's sister
- M.R.K. as Shakti's uncle
- Crane Manohar as the 12B bus conductor
- Scissor Manohar as the auto driver
- Vengaiya Balan as a devotee
- Gowthami Vembunathan as Shakti's aunt
- Monica as Priya's co-worker
- Karnaa Radha as a devotee
- Citizen Mani as a coconut seller
- John Ranjith as Shakti's co-worker
- Shiva as Shakti's co-worker

Parthiban provided the voice-over at the beginning of the film.

== Production ==
=== Development ===
"It's been a big thrill, directing a film, being captain of the ship. Having been a cinematographer definitely helped, I could execute the film faster. And also, I've drawn a lot of inspiration from the directors I've worked with, like Shankar, Surya, and my all-time favourite, Priyadarshan".

— Jeeva on the film, 2001

12B marked the directorial debut of cinematographer Jeeva and is narrated in a dual narrative format, one if Shakthi (the protagonist) catches the 12B bus to his job interview and one if he misses the same bus. Jeeva said the film would be titled 12B after a bus he used to take during his college days in Chennai. The plot of the film was taken from the 1998 English film Sliding Doors by Peter Howitt, which follows alternate timelines on whether or not Helen (Gwyneth Paltrow) catches a train. The gender roles in Sliding Doors were reversed and the train was replaced by a bus in this film. Film producer Vikram Singh opted to make his first foray into Tamil film production after being encouraged to by director Priyadarshan.

=== Casting ===
Madhavan and Vikram were initially considered for the lead role, but they were busy with other projects. Srikanth was also briefly attached to the film. While the search for lead actor was ongoing, Simran and Jyothika, two of the leading Tamil actresses at the time, were cast in the other lead roles. Their dates to shoot for the film were available since October 2000; however, there was no lead actor for the film although two newcomers were considered for backups.

Shaam had worked as a model in Bangalore for four years before model coordinator Biju Jayadevan introduced him to director Jeeva, who was auditioning a debutant actor for his debut venture, 12B. Shaam had unsuccessfully auditioned for the lead role in Kadhalar Dhinam (1999); he said during his first meeting with Jeeva, he handed over his portfolio and introduced himself in English. Jeeva said: "Repeat what you just said, in Tamil". Shaam did so and was signed on next day after a meeting with producer Vikram Singh. Since Shaam was looking for film offers for four years, Jeeva did not treat Shaam as a newcomer.

Jyothika got more screen time while Simran called her role a "special appearance". Thota Tharani worked as the art director for the film. The promos of the film were critically praised; Shaam signed on to appear in several projects before 12B was released. The film also featured Jeeva's assistant director, Srinath, in a supporting role. After the first filming schedule, another actor tried to fill the lead role but Jeeva insisted on retaining Shaam.

A leading Hindi actor was revealed to play a cameo in the film. The actor was later revealed upon release to be Sunil Shetty, who was cast to play Jyothika's uncle. Bengali actor Moon Moon Sen, mother of Riya Sen, was signed on to play Jyothika's mother in the film. In 12B, Shaam's voice was dubbed; an uncommon practice for male actors in Tamil cinema at that time. Shiva, who later starred in Chennai 600028 (2007), made his acting debut with this film in a minor role. Chennai-based model Manish Borundia played a background actor in the film. Parthiban provided a voiceover for the film.

== Soundtrack ==
The soundtrack of 12B was composed by Harris Jayaraj. The soundtrack became popular particularly the song "Oru Punnagai Poove". Premgi Amaran crooned the rap song "Anandam".

All lyrics are written by Vairamuthu except where noted.

Tamil Track-List
No.	Title	Singer(s)	Length
1.	"Love Pannu (Oru Punnagai Poove)"	KK, Prashanthini	4:40
2.	"Sariya Thavara" (Lyrics:Vaali)	Samantha Edward, Febi Mani, Mathangai	5:02
3.	"Mutham Mutham"	KK, Mahalakshmi Iyer	5:02
4.	"Poove Vai Pesum Pothu"	Mahalakshmi Iyer, Harish Raghavendra	5:48
5.	"Jothi Neranjava"	Sukhwinder Singh, Febi Mani	4:46
6.	"Anandam"	Premgi Amaren, Clinton Cerejo	2:17
7.	"O Nenjae"	Sujatha Rao	1:47
8.	"Oru Paarvai Paar"	Karthik	2:22
9.	"Party Music" (Instrumental, Shehnai – S. Ballesh)		1:32
Total length:			33:16

All tracks are written by Kulasekhar.

Telugu Track-List
No.	Title	Singer(s)	Length
1.	"Anna Thotti Dammu"	Febi Mani	5:03
2.	"O Punami Puvva"	S. P. B. Charan, Gopika Poornima	4:41
3.	"Naalo Ee Mouna"	Karthik, Gopika Poornima	5:49
4.	"Mela Thalatho"	Mallikarjun, Gopika Poornima	4:47
5.	"Muddu Muddu"	Karthik, Gopika Poornima	5:03
6.	"Theme Music" (Instrumental)		1:30
Total length:			21:31

== Marketing and release ==
12B received pre-release publicity because it brought together Simran and Jyothika, two of the Tamil film industry's leading actresses of the period. The film's trailer, which was edited by Deepak Bhojraj, was the fasted edited trailer in Tamil cinema at the time featured the names of the film's technicians coming and going like the sound of a bus horn.

The film performed modestly at the box office with average collections reported. Producer Vikram Singh revealed that he lost money producing the film although he felt it was worth it due to the film's unique script. Jeeva later stating he felt the film had not been properly promoted and could have done better business if it had been.

The appearance of Sunil Shetty in a prominent role led the filmmakers to dub the film in Hindi as Do Raaste 12B (transl. Two ways 12B) in 2005. A Telugu dubbed version was released in October 2005. The Hindi dubbed version was released in Germany in 2007 under the title Buslinie 12B – Was wäre wenn? (transl. Bus route 12B – What if?) with Shetty falsely promoted as the lead actor.

== Reception ==
A critic from The Hindu said the film is like "moving through a maze, because for many it could be confusion confounded, at least for the most part of the first half". The critic added; "Shyam in the hero's garb is an apt choice and looks more like a Madhavan clone and for a newcomer, Shyam is absolutely at ease in dance and fights" and "Simran does a commendable job in the climax". New Straits Times wrote; "The presence of Jyotika, Simran and Shyam saves this movie from boredom". Rediff concluded its review; "full marks to the intention – considerably less for the execution", praised the film's performances and technical aspects and said a "drawback would be the languid pace—there is not enough tension built into the film and, for large chunks of time, the story remains static, with the result that you do not empathise with the characters". The reviewer said Simran's portrayal "continues with her policy of shifting gradually from glam roles to the more sedate, serious ones and proves to have what it takes".

Sify wrote; "Ultimately it is very difficult for the audience to understand this superficial tale, as they cannot follow the thin line between reality and imagination. It is total confusion". The reviewer praised the Jayaraj's music for the film. Malini Mannath of Chennai Online opined that "But Jeeva steers his script deftly, and offers a film that is different, giving enough food for thought and room for discussion even after the film is over" but questioned the change from a female protagonist in Sliding Doors to a male protagonist. Visual Dasan of Kalki criticised the film's story (which he felt was similar to Sliding Doors and the 1999 German film Run Lola Run), called both roles of Shaam confusing and felt bad for Simran taking up such a role. He praised Vivek's comedy, Harris Jayaraj songs and the director for trying to take up a unique subject for his debut film. Asokan Nirmalarajah of the German site mannbeistfilm.de reviewing the Hindi dubbed version in 2007 wrote that debutant director Jeeva is at his best especially in the down-to-earth musical sequences and uses the fresh, youthful, lively, very romantic songs by Harris Jeyaraj to make the film very dynamic and entertaining. This only applies to a limited extent for the rest of the film but felt that the 'what if?' aspect was already explored in films such as Blind Chance (1987), Sliding Doors and Run Lola Run.
