= List of Tamil films of 2004 =

Prior to the amendment of Tamil Nadu Entertainments Tax Act 1939 on 4 October 2004, gross was 125 per cent of net for all films. Post-amendment, gross fell to 115 per cent of net. The Commercial Taxes Department disclosed ₹59.09 crore in entertainment tax revenue for the year.

A list of films released in the Tamil film industry in India in 2004:

== Box office collection ==
The following is the list of highest-grossing Tamil cinema films released in 2004.

The Highest Worldwide Gross of 2004
Rank	Title	Production company	Worldwide gross
1	Ghilli	Sri Surya Movies	₹50 crore
2	Vasool Raja MBBS	Gemini Film Circuit	₹25−30 crore
3	Manmadhan	Indian Theatre Productions	₹25 crore
4	Virumaandi	Raaj Kamal Films International	₹22 crore
5	M. Kumaran Son of Mahalakshmi	Jayam Productions	₹21 crore
6	Autograph	Dream Theatres	₹20−22 crore
7	Madhurey	Movie Magic	₹20 crore
8	7/G Rainbow Colony	Sri Surya Movies	₹15−17 crore
9	Arul	Lakshmi Productions	₹15 crore
10	Engal Anna	Aandal Azhagar Cine Creations	₹10 crore

== List of Tamil films ==
=== January—March ===
Opening		Title	Director	Cast	Studio	Ref
J A N	1	Baabi	M. V. Gopalan			
J A N	1	Kadhal Saregama	Ameerjan	Kaushik		
J A N	14	Engal Anna	Siddique	Vijayakanth, Prabhu Deva, Pandiarajan, Swarnamalya, Namitha, Vadivelu	Aandal Azhagar Cine Creations	
J A N	14	Image	Alex Pandian	Jai Varma, Abhinayashree	Imayam Entertainers	
J A N	14	Jai	S. Narayan	Prashanth, Anshu Ambani, Thyagarajan, Rajkiran, Bhanupriya	Lakshmi Shanthi Movies	
J A N	14	Kovil	Hari	Silambarasan, Sonia Agarwal, Rajkiran, Nassar	Sri Surya Movies	
J A N	14	Pudhukottaiyilirundhu Saravanan	S. S. Stanley	Dhanush, Aparna Pillai, Karunas	Indian Theatre Production	
J A N	14	Virumaandi	Kamal Haasan	Kamal Haasan, Abhirami, Napoleon, Pasupathy, Rohini	Raaj Kamal Films International	
F E B	6	Thendral	Thangar Bachan	Parthiban, Uma, Swathi	Aascar Films	
F E B	6	Vayasu Pasanga	Bharathi Kannan	Anush, Jai Arvind, Master Manikandan, Vindhya	V. Productions	
F E B	13	Kamaraj	A. Balakrishnan	Richard Madhuram, Vijayan, Mahendran, V. S. Raghavan	Ramana Communications Shakthi International	
F E B	13	Varnajalam	Nakulan Ponnusamy	Srikanth, Sadha, Kutty Radhika	GJ Cinema	
F E B	20	Autograph	Cheran	Cheran, Sneha, Gopika, Mallika, Kanika	Dream Theaters	
F E B	20	Kangalal Kaidhu Sei	Bharathiraja	Vaseegaran, Priyamani, Sanath Gunathilake	Lakshmi Movie Makers	
F E B	26	Ennavo Pudichirukku	Meenakshi Sundaram	Sudeep Sarangi, Bharani, Sindhuri	SSS Good Look Films	
F E B	27	Campus	Sharvi	Sajith Raj, Nitesh, Divya Dwivedi, Sheetal Shah	Dreamland Movies	
M A R	5	Adi Thadi	Shivraj	Sathyaraj, Napoleon, Abbas, Rathi, Sukanya	Sundari Films	
M A R	5	Gambeeram	Suresh	Sarath Kumar, Laila, Pranathi, Vadivelu	Mass Movie Makers	
M A R	12	Nee Mattum	Mathi Natesh	Jana, Deepu, Preethi		
M A R	19	Aarumugasaamy	Raviraja	Pandiarajan, Preethi Varma		
M A R	26	Pethi Solla Thattathea	Dharma	Pandiarajan, Nanditha		
M A R	26	Udhaya	Azhagam Perumal	Vijay, Simran	Pyramid Entertainment	

=== April—June ===
Opening		Title	Director	Cast	Studio	Ref
A P R	2	Kadhal Dot Com	Selvaraj	Prasanna, Anu Sasi, Shruthi Raj	AAA Movies International	
A P R	14	Kanavu Meippada Vendum	Janaki Vishwanathan	Ramya Krishnan, Asim Sharma, Lakshmi Gopalaswamy, Karthik Srinivasan	Sruthika Foundations	
A P R	14	Kuthu	A. Venkatesh	Silambarasan, Divya Spandana, Kalabhavan Mani	Daivanai Movies	
A P R	17	Ghilli	Dharani	Vijay, Trisha, Prakash Raj, Ashish Vidyarthi	Sri Surya Movies	
A P R	23	Aethirree	K. S. Ravikumar	R. Madhavan, Sadha, Kanika, Rahman	Mars Entertainment Group	
A P R	23	Vaanam Vasappadum	P. C. Sriram	Karthik Kumar, Poongkothai Chandrahasan, Revathi, Nassar	R. K. Digital Film Makers	
A P R	23	Kavithai	G. Kicha	Vamsi, Chaya Singh, Sarath Babu		
M A Y	1	Arul	Hari	Vikram, Jyothika, Pasupathy, Kollam Thulasi	Lakshmi Productions	
M A Y	1	Jana	Shaji Kailas	Ajith Kumar, Sneha, Manoj K. Jayan, Siddique	Roja Combines	
M A Y	7	Perazhagan	Sasi Shanker	Suriya, Jyothika, Vivek	AVM Productions	
M A Y	14	Settai	Shivan	Pandiarajan, Livingston, Vindhya		
M A Y	21	Aaytha Ezhuthu	Mani Ratnam	Suriya, R. Madhavan, Siddharth, Meera Jasmine, Trisha, Esha Deol	Madras Talkies	
J U N	11	Jore	Selva	Sathyaraj, Sibiraj, Bhanupriya, Gajala, Ramana	Sena Films	
J U N	11	Maanasthan	Marumalarchi Bharathi	Sarath Kumar, Abbas, Sakshi Sivanand	Malar Combines	
J U N	25	Machi	K. S. Vasanthakumar	Dushyanth Ramkumar, Shubha Poonja, Pasupathy	Indian Theatre Production	
J U N	25	Super Da	Azhagu Raja Sundaram	Ramki, Kunal, Anusha	Sree Ashtalakshmi Films	

=== July—September ===
Opening		Title	Director	Cast	Studio	Ref
J U L	9	New	S. J. Surya	S. J. Surya, Simran, Devayani, Kiran Rathod	Annai Mary Madha Creations	
J U L	9	Singara Chennai	Suriyan	Abhinay, Rathi, Kalabhavan Mani		
J U L	16	Saga	Ramesh Krish	Akshaya		
J U L	16	Sema Ragalai	Ram	Sathyaraj, Devayani, Kalabhavan Mani		
J U L	23	Shock	Thiagarajan	Prashanth, Meena, Abbas	Lakshmi Shanthi Movies	
J U L	23	Sullan	Ramana	Dhanush, Sindhu Tolani, Pasupathy	Sri Saravanaa Creations	
J U L	30	Azhagiya Theeye	Radha Mohan	Prasanna, Navya Nair, Jai Varma, Prakash Raj	Duet Movies	
J U L	30	Loves	K. Jayapandian	Thamizh, Sona, Sweety		
J U L	30	Kadhale Jayam	V. Natarajan	V. Natarajan, Sudeep Sarangi, Swathika, Preethi Varma	Natarajan Films	
A U G	6	Sound Party	Aarthi Kumar	Sathyaraj, Prathyusha, Manivannan, Vadivelu	G. R. Gold Films	
A U G	10	Arivumani	M. K. Kennedy	Murali, Meera Vasudevan, Shreesha	Winner Creations	
A U G	15	Vasool Raja MBBS	Saran	Kamal Haasan, Sneha, Prabhu, Prakash Raj, Jayasurya	Raaj Kamal Films International	
A U G	22	Azhagesan	Aarthi Kumar	Sathyaraj, Prema, Manoj K. Jayan	Grace Movie Makers	
A U G	29	Kalamulla Kalam Varai	Udhaya			
A U G	29	Madhurey	Ramana Madhesh	Vijay, Rakshitha, Sonia Agarwal, Tejashree	Movie Magic	
S E P	3	Kudaikul Mazhai	R. Parthiban	R. Parthiban, Madhumitha, Sriman, Deepa Venkat	Bioscope Film Framers	
S E P	10	Chellamae	Gandhi Krishna	Vishal, Reemma Sen, Bharath, Vivek	GJ Cinema	
S E P	17	Arasatchi	N. Maharajan	Arjun, Lara Dutta, Raghuvaran, Karan	Cee (I)TV Entertainment(P) Ltd.	
S E P	17	Gajendra	Suresh Krishna	Vijayakanth, Laya, Flora	Tamilanai Cine Creation	

=== October—December ===
Opening		Title	Director	Cast	Studio	Ref
O C T	1	Giri	Sundar C	Arjun, Reemma Sen, Divya Spandana, Devayani	Avni Cinemax	
O C T	1	M. Kumaran Son of Mahalakshmi	M. Raja	Jayam Ravi, Asin, Nadhiya, Prakash Raj	Jayam Productions	
O C T	1	Oru Murai Sollividu	A. Jawahar	Rohit, Janapriya, Yugendran	Kamakshi Amman Creations	
O C T	8	Bose	Senthil Kumar	Srikanth, Sneha, Kalabhavan Mani	Shri Mahalakshmi Combines	
O C T	8	Rush	S. Rajkumar	Rajkumar, Mangai		
O C T	15	Adhu	Ramesh Balakrishnan	Sneha, Abbas, Aravind, Suha	Vishwas Films	
O C T	22	7G Rainbow Colony	Selvaraghavan	Ravi Krishna, Sonia Agarwal, Suman Shetty	Sri Surya Movies	
O C T	22	Vishwa Thulasi	Sumathy Ram	Mammooty, Nandita Das		
O C T	29	En Purushan Ethir Veetu Ponnu	Barani Kumar	Pandiarajan, Sanghavi, Radhika Chaudhari, Abhinayashree		
N O V	5	Neranja Manasu	Samudrakani	Vijayakanth, Susan, Mahima, Nassar	GJ Cinema	
N O V	12	Attahasam	Saran	Ajith Kumar, Pooja, Babu Antony, Sujatha	Vijayam Cine Combines	
N O V	12	Chatrapathy	Srimahesh	Sarath Kumar, Nikita Thukral, Prakash Raj, Vadivelu	JJ Films	
N O V	12	Dreams	Kasthuri Raja	Dhanush, Diya, Parul Yadav	Akshay Films	
N O V	12	Manmadhan	A. J. Murugan; Silambarasan	Silambarasan, Jyothika, Sindhu Tolani, Atul Kulkarni	Indian Theatre Production	
D E C	3	Amma Appa Chellam	Suriyan	Bala, Chaya Singh, Sathya	Ramadevi Cine Enterprises	
D E C	3	Maha Nadigan	Sakthi Chidambaram	Sathyaraj, Manoj Bharathiraja, Mallika, Namitha, Mumtaj	Sundari Films	
D E C	17	Aai	A. Venkatesh	Sarath Kumar, Namitha, Kalabhavan Mani	Thiruvalluvar Kalaikoodam	
D E C	17	Jaisurya	Manoj Kumar	Arjun, Laila, Chaya Singh	Guru Films	
D E C	17	Jananam	Ramesh Selvan	Arun Vijay, Priyanka Trivedi, Ashish Vidyarthi, Raghuvaran	Crescent Movie International	
D E C	17	Kaadhal	Balaji Sakthivel	Bharath, Sandhya, Sukumar	S Pictures	
D E C	17	Meesai Madhavan	S. Ramu	Ramana, Kutty Radhika, Ilavarasu	Uvasree Creations	
D E C	24	Gomathi Nayagam	Ponvannan	Ponvannan, Haripriya, Karthika, Manivannan	Sunitha Productions	
D E C	26	Kadhale Engal Desiya Geetham	Vijay Anand	Sriram Raghavan, Varshini, Ramesh Aravind		
D E C	26	Ramakrishna	Agathiyan	Jai Akash, Sridevika, Vani	Sivasakthi Movie Makers	
D E C	26	Remote	Karvannan	Napolean, Anamika, Sukumar	Jeevan Films	

=== Other releases ===
The following films were also released in 2004, though the release date remains unknown.

Title	Director	Cast	Studio	Ref
Jollyman	K. K. Muthukumaar	Pandiarajan, Aishwarya	Varshini	
Kizhakku Boomi	D. K. Bose		Poornakala Production	
Pinju Nenjangal Puthiyathor Ulagam	Ilayavan		APN Pictures	
Pithan	N. Manikandan	Ashwathaman, Devan, Priya		
Senthalam Poove	Benjamin	Livingston, Devayani	NS Pictures	

== Awards ==
Category/organization	Dinakaran Cine Awards 23 May 2005	Filmfare Awards South 23 July 2005	Tamil Nadu State Film Awards 13 February 2006
Best Film	Autograph	Autograph	Autograph
Best Director	Cheran; Autograph	Cheran; Autograph	Cheran; Autograph
Best Actor	Vijay; Ghilli	Suriya; Perazhagan	Jayam Ravi; M. Kumaran Son of Mahalakshmi
Best Actress	Jyothika; Perazhagan	Sandhya; Kaadhal	Jyothika; Perazhagan
Best Music Director	Yuvan Shankar Raja; Manmadhan	Bharadwaj / Yuvan Shankar Raja; Autograph / 7G Rainbow Colony	Srikanth Deva; M. Kumaran Son of Mahalakshmi
