= Paravai Muniyamma =

Indian folk singer and actress (1937–2020)

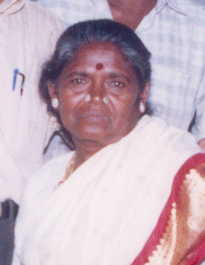
- Muniyamma in 2011
- Born: Muniyamma; 25 June 1937; Paravai, Madras Presidency, British India
- Died: 29 March 2020 (aged 82); Paravai, Madurai, India
- Occupations: Actress, Singer
- Years active: 1957–2017
- Awards: Kalaimamani (2019)

Paravai Muniyamma (25 June 1937 – 29 March 2020) was an Indian folk singer and actress. She got the adjective Paravai as she was born in a village called Paravai in Madurai. She featured in many Tamil films mostly in supporting roles and also worked as a playback singer. Muniyamma also had her own cooking show on Kalaignar TV. She was introduced by music director Vidyasagar in the Tamil film industry.

== Career ==
Muniyamma pursued her career as a singer by performing at cultural temple functions and also performed around 2,000 stage performances of folk songs in her 60s, which also include shows in London, Singapore and Malaysia on behalf of the Lakshman Sruthi. In an interview with The Hindu in 2004, she once pointed out the fact that her overseas international folk related programmes stand testimony to the fact that human race has a passion towards folk art and culture.

She was approached by several musical directors during her peak, notably by A. R. Rahman to croon a song for the 1995 film Muthu, however she turned down the offer for unknown reasons. She was also approached by music director Vidyasagar to croon a folk song for the film Dhool (2003) and she accepted the offer. She made her film debut as playback singer with the film Dhool and sang her first film song "Singam Pola Nadanthu Vaaraan" which was well acclaimed by the audience as the song was shot during a fighting sequence. She was eventually cast in a supporting role in the same film by director which also eventually marked her film acting debut at the age of 66. She then appeared in over 50 films, usually playing grandmother roles. The success of the film and the song prompted further acting and singing offers for Muniyamma from the film industry.

After she was hospitalized in 2015, the Tamil film industry helped her, including actors Sivakarthikeyan, Sarathkumar and Vishal. Then, Chief Minister Jayalalithaa helped her under the MGR welfare scheme by arranging 6 lakhs fixed deposit in her name, and actor Dhanush took care of her treatment expenses.

In November 2019, she was rumoured to have died after being critically ill. In February 2020, she came to promote and watch the film Maayanadhi in theatre after a request from actor Abi Saravanan despite being critically ill for years. She was awarded the Kalaimamani in 2019 by the government of Tamil Nadu.

== Filmography ==
Tamil films

- Dhool (2003)
- Kadhal Sadugudu (2003)
- Unnai Charanadaindhen (2003)
- Kovil (2004)
- Super Da (2004)
- Arivumani (2004)
- En Purushan Ethir Veetu Ponnu (2004)
- Aai (2004)
- Jaisurya (2004)
- Devathaiyai Kanden (2005)
- Kannadi Pookal (2005)
- Thaka Thimi Tha (2005)
- Nenjil (2006)
- Nagareega Komali (2006)
- Suyetchai MLA (2006)
- Pasupathi c/o Rasakkapalayam (2007)
- Sandai (2008)
- Poo (2008)
- Thoranai (2009)
- Rajathi Raja (2009)
- Tamizh Padam (2010)
- Magane En Marumagane (2010)
- Bale Pandiya (2010)
- Bhavani IPS (2011)
- Venghai (2011)
- Kasethan Kadavulada (2011)
- Udumban (2012)
- Oruvar Meethu Iruvar Sainthu (2013)
- Veeram (2014)
- Maan Karate (2014)
- Savaale Samaali (2015)
- Sathura Adi 3500 (2017)

Malayalam films

- Keerthi Chakra (2006)
- Pokkiriraja (2010)
- Oru Second Class Yathra (2015)

Singer

- "Singam Pola" - Dhool
- "Aala Pirandhavanda" - Unnai Charanadaindhen
- "Kiyan Kiyang" - Arivumani
- "Naadu Summa" - Nagareega Komali
- "Happy" - Bale Pandiya
- "Karuppusattai" - Bhavani IPS
- "Royapuram Peter" - Maan Karate

== Death ==
On 29 March 2020, Muniyamma died in her Madurai residence at the age of 82 due to age related illness.
