= Maanavan Ninaithal =

- Directed by: S. P. Gnanamozhi
- Written by: S. P. Gnanamozhi
- Produced by: P. K. Chandran
- Starring: Rithik; Varshini
- Cinematography: Selva Kumar
- Edited by: M. R. Srinivasan
- Music by: V. Thashi
- Production company: Arul Movies
- Release date: 18 July 2008
- Running time: 135 minutes
- Country: India
- Language: Tamil

Maanavan Ninaithal is a 2008 Indian Tamil language romantic drama film directed by S. P. Gnanamozhi. The film stars newcomer Rithik and Varshini, with K. Bhagyaraj, Manivannan, Manobala, Pandu, Anu Mohan, Nalini and Vaman Malini playing supporting roles. The film, produced by P. K. Chandran, was released on 18 July 2008.

== Plot ==
In a village near Tiruvannamalai, the gifted student Sakthi is from a poor family, and his widowed mother Lakshmi runs a roadside food stall. Sakthi secures the state rank in his plus two exam and wishes to continue his studies, but his family circumstances and poverty compel him to give up his dream. During a television interview, Sakthi talks about his dream, and the government then helps Sakthi financially pursue his studies. Sakthi joins a prominent college in Chennai and stays in a lodge with his new collegemate Kottachi.

Sakthi gets acquainted with a group of three bad students in the college, and he starts taking drugs and drinking liquor. In the meantime, he befriends his collegemate Nivetha and falls in love with her. When Nivetha discovers that Sakthi loves her, she rejects him, stating the difference in their status. One day, the bad students take advantage of Sakthi, and they even steal his money; therefore, he cannot pay the college fees. Failing in life and in love, Sakthi decides to hang himself in a remote forest, but before doing so, he conveys his decision through an audio cassette and sends it to his mother by parcel. At that point, the press reporter Raj comes across him and saves him from ending his life. Raj, who is a skilled strategist and manipulator, even promises him to solve all his problems.

Raj first blackmails Nivetha to disclose her love affair with Sakthi to her family and asks her for money to buy his silence. With that money, he could pay Sakthi's college fees. Raj then intercepts the audio cassette with the help of the police. Meanwhile, Nivetha accepts Sakthi's love. Later, Sakthi saves the three bad students who had stolen his money from being expelled from the college, and they apologize for their mistakes. Sakthi passes the exam and eventually marries Nivetha.

== Cast ==
- Rithik as Sakthi
- Varshini as Nivetha
- K. Bhagyaraj as Raj
- Manivannan as Bhai
- Manobala as Professor
- Pandu as Professor
- Anu Mohan as Mohan
- Nalini as Nivetha's mother
- Vaman Malini as Lakshmi, Sakthi's mother
- Singamuthu as Bus conductor
- Nellai Siva as Courier office manager
- Kottachi as Kottachi
- Kili Ramachandran as Kili
- Mumtaj Pakoda Kadhar
- Chinrasu as Pickpocket
- V. P. Pratheesh
- Siva Narayana Murthy as Inspector Sivanarayanamoorthy
- Suruli Manohar as Police constable
- Round Lingan
- Baladhasan
- Selvakumar as Sivaraj
- Sampathkumar as Sampath
- Kalivaradan as Varadan
- Sriram as Sriram
- Tiruppur Thenali as Thenali
- Bharathi in a special appearance
- Risha in a special appearance

== Production ==
S. P. Gnanamozhi made his directorial debut with Maanavan Ninaithal under the banner of Arul Movies. Rithik was cast to play the hero while Varshini, who was last seen in Achacho (2007), signed to play the heroine under the name of Adhira.

== Soundtrack ==
The film score and the soundtrack were composed by V. Thashi.

Track listing
No.	Title	Lyrics	Singer(s)	Length
1.	"Nilave Thanga Nilave"	S. P. Gnanamozhi	P. C. Subish	4:11
2.	"Nee Perazhaga"	S. P. Gnanamozhi	P. C. Subish, Swarnalatha	4:43
3.	"Sullappa"	Tholkappian	P. C. Subish	4:36
4.	"Paramakudi"	S. P. Gnanamozhi	P. C. Subish	3:35
5.	"Angum Kadhal"	S. P. Gnanamozhi	P. C. Subish	3:03
6.	"Kadhal Kolladhey"	S. P. Gnanamozhi	Manikka Vinayagam, Anuradha Sriram	5:19
Total length:				25:18

== Reception ==
S. R. Ashok Kumar of The Hindu said, "K. Bhagyaraj still has the magic but he should concentrate more on his make-up and the way he is shown in the film. Both Rithik and Athira are clueless as to what they need to do in some of the scenes" and added, "Both the story and the screenplay are nothing new and the dialogue is average".
