= Kodai (film) =

- Directed by: Raajaselvam
- Written by: Raajaselvam
- Produced by: S. Pandi Durai
- Starring: Karthick Singa; Anaya Lakshmi; Ajay Rathnam
- Cinematography: Arjunan Karthick
- Edited by: G. Sasikumar
- Music by: Subash Kavi
- Production company: SS Pictures
- Release date: 10 February 2023
- Running time: 131 mins
- Country: India
- Language: Tamil

Kodai (transl. Charity) is a 2023 Indian Tamil-language romantic comedy drama film directed by Raajaselvam and starring Karthick Singa and Anaya Lakshmi in the lead roles. The film's music is composed by Subash Kavi, while the cinematography is handled by Arjunan Karthick and editing is done by G. Sasikumar. It was released on 10 February 2023.

== Plot ==
The story is set in a cottage at Kodaikanal and is inspired by real life incidents. It narrates how a gang robs a large donation to an orphanage for needy children, how the protagonist and his friends recover from the disaster, and the struggle which takes dangerous twists and turns from which they recover the lost gift. It is a humorous, action packed tale.

== Cast ==
- Karthick Singa as Baskar, cottage lessee protagonist
- Anaya as Pavithra, volunteer firewoman
- Robo Shankar as Paandi, Baskar's friend
- M. S. Bhaskar as Gnaanam, cottage ironer
- G. Marimuthu as Thangamani, teashop owner
- Singamuthu as the Broker
- Ajay Rathnam as Anandan
- Bose Venkat as Venkat, fake cop
- Swaminathan as Vadivel
- G. Gnanasambandam as the orphan caregivers
- Scissor Manohar as Pazhani, Baskar's friend
- Crane Manohar as Vadivel's brother-in-law
- Anand Babu as Pavithra's father
- Vincent Roy as the cottage owner
- K. R. Vijaya as Roja
- Nalini as Reels Beauty
- Vaishali Thaniga as Geetha, Pavithra's friend
- Jeevitha as Pavithra's mother
- Karate Raja as Madhan
- Meesai Rajendran as the fake cop
- Simbu Thoufiq as Manohar, love proposal guy

== Production ==
Vasan Karthik, the son of actor Singamuthu, who had earlier appeared in Maamadurai (2007) and Ayyan (2011), used the new stage name of Karthick Singa for Kodai.

== Music ==
Kodai

Soundtrack album by Subash Kavi
- Released: 17 August 2022
- Recorded: 2021–2022
- Genre: Feature film soundtrack
- Length: 20:43
- Language: Tamil
- Label: Skavi Music
- Producer: Subash Kavi
External audio
- Audio Jukebox on YouTube

Singles from Kodai
- 1. "Nalladhey Nadakkum" Released: 17 August 2022

The film's soundtrack and background score was composed by Subash Kavi.

Track listing
No.	Title	Lyrics	Singer(s)	Length
1.	"Avasaram Ipo Avasaram"	Thiaga Rajan, Subash Kavi	Anthony Daasan, Velmurugan	4:06
2.	"Nalladhey Nadakkum"	Raajaselvam	S. P. Charan	4:00
3.	"Enna Un Kanakku"	Subash Kavi	Mano	4:35
4.	"Ilavenil Poley"	Karthi Sri	Subash Kavi, Pandi Durai	3:03
5.	"Unna Pathi Mulusa"	Subash Kavi	Karthik, Vandana Srinivasan	4:57
Total length:				20:43

== Reception ==
The film was released on 10 February 2023 across Tamil Nadu. A critic from The Hindu Tamil gave the film two out of five stars, concluding that it was "low on excitement". A reviewer from Dina Thanthi noted that the film had a good mix of all "romance, comedy and action". A critic from Thinaboomi also gave the film a negative review.
