= Karagattakkari =

2005 Indian Tamil-language film

- Directed by: Bharathi Kannan
- Written by: Bharathi Kannan
- Produced by: London Shoban; Vilasini
- Starring: Roja; Shridhar; Vilasini
- Music by: Ilaiyaraaja
- Production company: Shrinidhi Theatres
- Release date: 18 March 2005
- Country: India
- Language: Tamil

Karagattakkari (transl. The Karakattam danseuse) is a 2005 Indian Tamil-language drama film directed by Bharathi Kannan. The film stars Roja, with S. S. R. Kannan and Vilasini playing supporting roles. The film, which was produced by London Shoban of Shrinidhi Theatres, was released on 18 March 2005.

== Cast ==
- Roja
- Baby Aashi
- S. S. R. Kannan
- Shridhar
- Vilasini
- Vinu Chakravarthy
- Shanmugasundaram
- Gandhimathi
- Yugendran
- Nellai Siva
- Thyagu

== Production ==
Director Bharathi Kannan had initially cast Khushbu in the lead role during mid-2004. The actress however was busy with film production work for Avni Cinemax as they were making Giri (2004), and had been slow to lose weight to play the character. As a result, Roja was drafted in to replace Khushbu in the lead role. Khushbu still remained hopeful of being reinstated in the role and hired karakattam dancers from Pudukottai to assist her with preparation, though Roja was finalised.

Impressed by the plot, actress Vilasini — who had earlier appeared in films such as Nalla Manasukkaran (1997) and Andipatti Arasampatti (2002) — agreed to jointly produce the film. It was the first film for Vilasini following her return from a spell in prison. Vilasini produced the film alongside London Shoban of Shrinidhi Theatres, who brought in several actors who had appeared in roles in the unrelated Karakattakkaran (1989), which had a similar theme. The filming was held at Sankaran Koil, Thirunellveli, Kutralam, Papanasam, Ambasamudhram and Surandai.

== Soundtrack ==
Karagattakkari

Soundtrack album by Ilaiyaraaja
- Released: 10 December 2004
- Recorded: 2004
- Genre: Feature film soundtrack
- Length: 37:41
- Producer: Ilaiyaraaja

The film score and the soundtrack were composed by Ilaiyaraaja. The soundtrack features 7 tracks.

| Track | Song | Singer(s) | Lyrics | Duration |
|---|---|---|---|---|
| 1 | "Enga Ooru Laila" | Tippu, Manjari | Kamakodiyan | 4:21 |
| 2 | "Ennapetha" | Ilaiyaraaja | Ilaiyaraaja | 4:55 |
| 3 | "Kattukkili" | Karthik, Bhavatharini | Vaali | 5:24 |
| 4 | "Kotti Vacha" | Dr. Lavanya | Mu. Metha | 4:29 |
| 5 | "Oththa Rooba" | Malathy, Tippu | Muthulingam | 4:58 |
| 6 | "Saada Maada" | Vijay Yesudas, Manjari | Palani Bharathi | 4:59 |
| 7 | "Thanthanathom Villupattu" | Mano, Kovai Kamala, Chorus | Ilaiyaraaja | 8:35 |
