= List of fictional couriers in film and television =

This is a list of fictional couriers in film and television that have been identified by name in notable works. A courier is usually someone who delivers something such as a message, package, or letter from one person to another. Couriers can be employees working exclusively for one person or can be freelance who are hired for one job. Couriers are different than mail service as they are a single person working exclusively for their client at one time.

== Film and television ==
Name	Work	Notes
Hannah	L.A. 7	Hannah is one of the roommates in L.A. 7, who begins working as a courier after the fuse in their apartment blows.
Frank Martin	Transporter	Frank Martin is a former Special Forces operative and freelance professional courier.
Ivan Miroshnikov	Courier	Ivan Miroshnikov is a 17-year old high school graduate who works as a courier for a small publishing company.
Postman Pat	Postman Pat	A postman who delivers for the Royal Mail in a quaint British village.
Raju	Niram	Raju is a courier who, along with his friends, dreams of making a movie.
Taylor Savage	M.A.N.T.I.S.	Taylor Savage is a courier whose connections through the business help M.A.N.T.I.S. out in episodes.
Cloud Strife	Final Fantasy VII: Advent Children	The film shows that following the events of Final Fantasy VII, Cloud and Tifa Lockhart began running a courier service.
Celty Sturluson	Durarara!!	Celty Sturluson is a Dullahan and a courier who does jobs, mostly for Izaya Orihara.
Caleb Van Huessen	Home and Away	Caleb Van Huessen is a courier who works for Ricky Sharpe.

== Video games ==
Name	Work	Notes
Courier Six	Fallout: New Vegas	Courier Six is the player character in the video game Fallout: New Vegas operating with the fictional Mojave Express prior to the start of the game.
Sam Porter Bridges	Death Stranding, Death Stranding 2: On the Beach	Sam Bridges is the player character in the Death Stranding series, tasked with delivering supplies to isolated colonies in a post-apocalyptic world.
