= Ponnar Shankar (soundtrack) =

- Front Cover

Soundtrack album by Ilaiyaraaja
- Released: 7 March 2011
- Recorded: 2009–2010
- Genre: Feature film soundtrack
- Length: 38:34
- Language: Tamil
- Label: Saga Music
- Producer: Ilaiyaraaja

Ilaiyaraaja chronology
Ayyan (2011)	Ponnar Shankar (2011)	Azhagarsamiyin Kuthirai (2011)

Ponnar Shankar is the soundtrack album to the 2011 epic historical drama film of the same name directed and produced by Thiagarajan, starring Prashanth. The film's soundtrack featured six songs composed by Ilaiyaraaja with Na. Muthukumar, Vaali, Palani Bharathi, Snehan and Ilaiyaraaja himself. The soundtrack was released on 7 March 2011 at the Saga Music label and received mixed reviews from critics.

== Background ==
Thiagarajan initially approached A. R. Rahman to compose the music for the film. But Rahman declined the offer citing scheduling conflicts, and Ilaiyaraaja eventually replaced him as the composer. Ilaiyaraaja had composed three songs initially but after watching the visuals, he was motivated to compose a romantic number "Kannai Padithaen". At the audio launch event, he recalled an incident that happened while re-recording the film in Mumbai, where a crew of a Bollywood film at the same studio, watched the song for a film and impressed by the grandeur, the producers there asked Ilaiyaraaja to dub the film, admitting that such high standards were not seen in Hindi cinema. The film initially had a track about the glories of Kongu Vellalar which was removed later during the editing process.

== Release ==
The album was launched on 7 March 2011 at the Prasad Studios in Chennai. The then-Chief Minister of Tamil Nadu M. Karunanidhi preceded as the chief guest and further saw the attendance of film industry and political personalities, besides the cast and crew.

== Reception ==
Malathi Rangarajan of The Hindu summarized that "Ilaiyaraja rules in re-recording" and described "Kannai Padithaen" as "simply melodious and rings in ones ears for long". Sify's reviewer also stated Ilaiyaraaja's "re-recording is a big plus" and the song "Kannai Padithaen" being the pick of the lot. The reviewer based at Nakkheeran also complimented Ilaiyaraaja's music and score. Karthik Srinivasan of Milliblog stated "barring those minor quibbles, this is a majestic soundtrack from the veteran." In contrast, the soundtrack received a negative review by Pavithra Srinivasan of Rediff.com, which stated that the "tunes were all generic" and that the operatic background score did not gel well with the film's subject. It summed that "Ilaiyaraja had just skimmed the bare bones of his usually fulfilling musical compositions". There was also a review in Dinakaran on the inappropriateness of the film's tracks as the reviewer felt they were ill-suited to the film's historical themes.

== Track listing ==
No.	Title	Lyrics	Singer(s)	Length
1.	"Kodi Katti Koduthalum"	Na. Muthukumar	Haricharan, Sathyan	4:14
2.	"Annanmaar Kathai"	Ilaiyaraaja	Madhu Balakrishnan, Hemambika, Anitha Karthikeyan	9:04
3.	"Bavaani Varugira"	Vaali	Shreya Ghoshal	7:36
4.	"Kannai Padithaen"	Palani Bharathi	Sriram Parthasarathy, Shreya Ghoshal	6:07
5.	"Thedi Vantha Devathai"	Snehan	Kunal Ganjawala, Shreya Ghoshal	5:09
6.	"Malar Villile"	Na. Muthukumar	Shreya Ghoshal, Darshana K. T.	6:24
