= Thathi Thavadhu Manasu =

- DVD cover
- Directed by: Azhagu Rajasundaram
- Written by: Rajaiya P. J.
- Story by: Peru Thulasi Pazhanivel
- Starring: Sona; Urvasi Patel; Sindhuri; Mumtaj
- Music by: Deva
- Production company: Wide Visions
- Release date: 19 December 2003
- Country: India
- Language: Tamil

Thathi Thavadhu Manasu (transl. Mind is wandering) is a 2003 Indian Tamil-language drama film written and directed by Azhagu Rajasundaram. The film stars Sona, Urvasi Patel and Sindhuri, while Mumtaj, Vadivelu and Kalabhavan Mani also appear in supporting roles. It was released on 19 December 2003.

== Plot ==
Three village girls who yearn to taste the big city life get to attend a friend's wedding in Chennai. But their joy comes to a halt when their money is stolen, leaving them stranded. Their parents complain to ACP Aarthi IPS who is a police officer as the girls didn't return to the village. Aarthi inquiries various people to find these 3 girls.

== Cast ==
- Sona as Mahalakshmi
- Urvasi Patel as Poonkodi
- Sindhuri as Amudha
- Mumtaj as ACP Aarthi IPS
- Abhinayashree
- Kalabhavan Mani as Ramaiya
- Vadivelu as Inspector Vaigaivel
- Nizhalgal Ravi
- Subhashini
- Fathima Babu
- Kalidaas as IGP
- Singamuthu
- Halwa Vasu
- Benjamin

== Production ==
The film marked the directorial debut of Azhagu Rajasundaram, who had previously apprenticed under directors Pandiarajan and Vikraman for fifteen years. Produced by V. K. Riaz Ahmed, Mumtaz's manager, the film's story was based around two real life incidents — the murder of a lawyer in bright daylight and the accident in which 40 individuals were killed.

== Soundtrack ==
Soundtrack was composed by Deva. The song "Kudu Kuduppu" is loosely based on Hindi song "Babuji Zara Dheere" from Hindi film Dum.

Song	Singers	Lyrics
"Kama Kama"	Mathangi, Malathy	Palani Bharathi
"Kanniley"	Sujatha	Ilampirai
"Kudukuduppai"	Manikka Vinayagam, Pushpa Sriram	Kabilan
"Pathu Vayasule"	Anuradha Sriram	Vaali
"Poo Poo Poonguruvi"	S. P. Balasubrahmanyam, Chinmayi	Kalaikumar
"Yetho Nenachuthan"	Ganga, Prashanthini	Snehan

== Reception ==
Malini Mannath of Chennai Online wrote "Finally, don't go by the title or it's [sic] heroine. For, it's a fairly serious and realistic film, socially relevant, at times heart-rending too. Though for hard-core Mumtaz fans who'd expect to see 'more' of her here, it may be a slight disappointment!".
