= Sri Raja Rajeshwari =

2001 film by Bharathi Kannan

- Directed by: Bharathi Kannan
- Written by: Bharathi Kannan
- Produced by: Pushpa Kandaswamy
- Starring: Ramya Krishnan; Ramki; Sanghavi; Bhanupriya
- Cinematography: Raja Rajan
- Music by: Deva
- Production company: Kavithalayaa Productions
- Release date: 13 April 2001
- Running time: 143 minutes
- Country: India
- Language: Tamil

Sri Raja Rajeshwari is a 2001 Indian Tamil language Hindu devotional film directed by Bharathi Kannan. The film stars Ramya Krishnan, Ramki and Sanghavi, with Bhanupriya, Nizhalgal Ravi, Vadivelu and Vinu Chakravarthy playing supporting roles. The film was released on 13 April 2001. The film was dubbed and partially reshot in Telugu, which was released a week later.

== Cast ==
- Ramya Krishnan as Raja Rajeswari
- Ramki as Rasaiyya and Raja (Ravintharnath's son)
- Sanghavi as Meenakshi
- Bhanupriya as Goddess Shakti and Vekkaliamman (Kali)
- Vadivelu as Minor Pandiyan and Nattamai
- Nizhalgal Ravi as Businessman Ravintharnath
- Ponnambalam as Sangkara
- Vinu Chakravarthy as Paampu Sithar "Rajalingam Swami"
- Delhi Ganesh as Rajeswari's father
- Malaysia Vasudevan as Sinthala karai Vekkali Amman priest and Meenakshi's father
- Thyagu as Prabakaran
- Pallavi as Rajeswari's mother
- K. R. Vatsala as Sangkara's wife
- Indhu as Katuvasi Girl who killed Prabakaran
- V. K. Ramasamy as Jothidar
- S. N. Parvathy as Rajeswari's grandmother
- Singamuthu as Katuvasi leader
- Lekhasri as Katuvasi Girl with Vadivelu
- Bonda Mani
- "Bayilvaan" Krishnasamy Thevar
- Bharathi Kannan
- Kullamani
- Siva Narayana Murthy
- Benjamin
- Nalini guest role in song ("Maruvathoor Om Sakthi")

== Production ==
A stint of shooting took place at Kuttralam near Tenkasi and at Injimedu Sivalayam where some scenes were picturised on Ramki and Ramya Krishnan. There is a song written by lyricist Kalidas which had the names of 165 Goddesses. This devotional song is picturised at 108 'Amman' temples of Tamil Nadu, with Nalini featuring in the song "Maruvathoor Om Sakthi". This song was sung by renowned playback singer K. S. Chithra.

== Soundtrack ==
Sri Raja Rajeshwari

Soundtrack album by Deva
- Released: 2001
- Genre: Soundtrack
- Length: 34.55

Deva chronology
Maayan (2001)	Sri Raja Rajeshwari (2001)	Lovely (2001)

Music was composed by Deva. This is the first devotional movie for Deva. This soundtrack has 6 songs. The lyrics were written by Kalidasan, Viveka, Bharathiputhiran, Seerkazhi Govindarajan (Slokam) and Muralikrishnan (Slokam).

No.	Song	Singers	Lyrics
1	"Chindala Karaiyil"	K. S. Chithra,	Kalidasan
2	"Kaathile Maan"	Sirkazhi G. Sivachidambaram	Bharathiputhiran
3	"Maruvathoor Om Sakthi"	K. S. Chithra	Kalidasan
4	"Raasave Ennai" (duet)	Anuradha Sriram, Krishnaraj	Viveka
5	"Raasave Ennai" (female)	Anuradha Sriram	Viveka
6	"Thiruchendoor Kadal"	Kovai Kamala, Krishnaraj	Kalidasan

== Reception ==
Chennai Online wrote "No serious thought seems to have gone into the scripting. It is taken for granted that the audience would swallow anything if it has the label of a 'devotional' film. There is a couple of interesting computer graphics. But graphics can do only that much, when the screenplay is so weak". Indiainfo wrote "Many of the deeds of Ramya and counter by the goddess give the ample scope to put full power the graphics. Ramya does a good job in the title role. It looks as if the director has (Bharathi Kannan) has weaved an interesting tale only to suit the graphics". The Hindu wrote "All the lead stars have dual roles to play. Ramki does not have much to do. Ramya Krishnan hogs the limelight and does justice to her roles. `Nizhalgal' Ravi does a neat job. Ponnambalam and Thyagu are adequate. Vadivelu's comedy is average. Bhanupriya as the goddess has nothing much to offer". Screen India wrote "Director Bharathi Kannan has tried his best to weave an interesting tale to suit the graphics man and in the process lost out on the narration".
