= Saptham =

- Directed by: Sivaguru
- Starring: Rishi Rithiga Sriman Abhinayashree
- Cinematography: K. Nithya
- Music by: Gana-Lal
- Production company: Saburaa International
- Release date: 15 March 2002
- Country: India
- Language: Tamil

Saptham is a 2002 Indian Tamil-language film directed by Sivaguru and starring Rishi, Rithiga, Sriman and Abhinayashree. It was released on 15 March 2002.

== Cast ==
- Rishi as Arun
- Rithiga as Vaidehi
- Sriman as Pradeep
- Abhinayashree as Jennifer
- Charle as Kothandam
- Ramesh Khanna as Jagir

== Soundtrack ==
Soundtrack was composed by Gana-Lal.

- Ooruni Oorukku - Anuradha Sriram
- Kanava Ninaiva - Anuradha Sriram
- Enpayar Enakkae - Nithyasree Mahadevan
- Pasasanitha Santhosam - Krishnaraj, Sriram
- Athimara Poo - Anuradha Sriram, Krishnaraj
- Vaanavil Vaanavil - P. Unni Krishnan
- Unthan Pugai Padathai - Srinivas, Sujatha

== Reception ==
The film was released on 15 March 2002. In his review, S. R. Ashok Kumar of The Hindu noted "if only the director Sivaguru, who is also in charge of story, screenplay and dialogue had paid more attention to the narration, he could have come up with an enjoyable film." Malini Mannath of ChennaiOnline wrote "in a futile effort to take the audience by surprise, the director who begins it as a love story, suddenly turns it into a triangle, only to reveal in the end that there were four players in the game".
