= Saayam =

2022 Tamil language drama film

- Theatrical release poster
- Directed by: Antony Samy
- Produced by: Antony Samy
- Starring: Abi Saravanan; Shiny; Ponvannan
- Cinematography: Saleem-Christopher
- Edited by: Muthu Muniyasamy
- Music by: Nagha Udhayan
- Production company: White Lamp Productions
- Release date: 4 February 2022
- Running time: 149 mins
- Country: India
- Language: Tamil

Saayam (transl. Dye) is a 2022 Indian Tamil-language drama film written and directed by Antony Samy. Abi Saravanan, Shiny and Ponvannan appear in the lead roles. Produced by White Lamp Productions, it was released on 4 February 2022.

== Cast ==
- Abi Saravanan as Marudhu
- Shiny as Gayathri
- Ponvannan as Marudhu's father
- Ilavarasu as Rasaiah's father
- Bose Venkat
- Thennavan
- Benjamin
- Seetha
- Senthi Kumari
- Antony Samy as Kasi
- Aadesh Bala as Chellapandi
- Vignesh Mohandas as Rasaiah

== Production ==
Abi Saravanan revealed that he was working on Saayam during late 2016, and reconfirmed that the film was still in production during 2021. Shiny, who had earlier appeared in India Pakistan (2015) was cast as the lead actress.

== Release ==
The film was released on 4 February 2022 across theatres in Tamil Nadu. A critic from the Dinamalar gave the film two stars out of five. A reviewer from Maalai Malar mentioned that the film was "disappointing". Critic from Dinamalar gave 2 ratings out of 5 ratings.
