= Otha Votu Muthaiya =

2025 Indian political comedy film

- Theatrical release poster
- Directed by: Sai Rajagopal
- Produced by: Sai Rajagopal
- Starring: Goundamani; Yogi Babu
- Cinematography: S. A. Kathavarayan
- Edited by: S. P. Raja Sethupathi; Noel
- Music by: Siddharth Vipin
- Production companies: Cine Craft Production; Kutti Story Pictures
- Distributed by: Buvanesh Chinnaswamy
- Release date: 14 February 2025
- Country: India
- Language: Tamil

Otha Votu Muthaiya (transl. 'One Vote' Muthaiya) is a 2025 Indian Tamil-language political comedy film written and directed by Sai Rajagopal. The film stars Goundamani and Yogi Babu in the lead roles, alongside Rajendran and Santhana Bharathi. The film was produced by Raviraja ME under the banner of Cine Craft Production and Kutti Story Pictures.

Otha Votu Muthaiya released in theatres on 14 February 2025.

== Plot ==
After losing a political party election by a single vote, a dedicated member is denied another chance. He takes matters into his own hands by running independently and emerges victorious. Muthaiya is a respectable member of a political party who hopes to marry off his three sisters to three eligible brothers. While challenges are mounting in his political career, what does life have in store for Muthaiya?

== Cast ==
- Goundamani as Muthaiya
- Yogi Babu as Egmore
- Sai Dhanyaa
- Satish Mohan
- Rajendran as Sithappa
- Santhana Bharathi as Minister
- Chitra Lakshmanan as Periyappa
- Singamuthu as Kopparasaamy
- Bayilvan Ranganathan as Police Inspector
- Sendrayan
- Ravi Mariya as Sai Krishna
- O. A. K. Sundar as Saravana Pandiyan
- Vaiyapuri
- Ganeshkar
- Karthick Singa as Guna
- Anu Mohan as Personal income tax officer
- Kottachi
- TSR Srinivasan
- Cool Suresh
- Scissor Manohar as Broker Narayana
- Muthukaalai as Sangaralingam
- Kadhal Sukumar as Ilangumaran
- Bonda Mani as Farmer
- Hima Bindu as Shalini
- Anbu Mayilsamy as Sathya
- Bijesh

== Production ==
The film is directed by Sai Rajagopal who already worked with Goundamani over 70 films and the shooting of the film was wrapped up in February 2024. The technical team consists of S. A. Kathavarayan as the cinematographer, S. P. Raja Sethupathi and Noel as the editor, Siddharth Vipin as the music composer and Buvanesh Chinnaswamy as creative producer.

== Soundtrack ==
Track listing
No.	Title	Lyrics	Singer(s)	Length
1.	"Mangiska Kangiska"	Snehan	Mookkuthi Murugani	3:34
Total length:				3:34

== Critical response ==
Roopa Radhakrishnan of The Times of India gave 1.5/5 stars and wrote "Otha Votu Muthaiya isn't a film where you have to fish for answers or expect a logical flow in what's happening. With that said, to the film's credit, it also doesn't pretend to be anything more than that." Dinamalar rated 2.25 out of 5.
