= Unnai Charanadaindhen =

- DVD cover
- Directed by: Samuthirakani
- Written by: Samuthirakani
- Produced by: S. P. B. Charan
- Starring: Venkat Prabhu; S. P. B. Charan; Meera Vasudevan
- Cinematography: Rajesh Yadav
- Edited by: K. Pazhanivel
- Music by: S. P. Balasubrahmanyam; Srinivasa Moorthy
- Production company: Capital Film Works
- Release date: 19 September 2003
- Country: India
- Language: Tamil

Unnai Charanadaindhen is a 2003 Indian Tamil-language romantic drama film directed by Samuthirakani, in his directoral debut starring Venkat Prabhu, S. P. B. Charan and Meera Vasudevan. It was produced by Charan's Capital Film Works and features a soundtrack composed by his father S. P. Balasubrahmanyam. Although the film was made on a small budget and fetched critical acclaim upon release, also winning two Tamil Nadu State Film Awards, Charan has said that it was not a profitable venture. Samuthirakani later directed the Telugu remake Naalo (2004).

== Plot ==
Nandha and Kannan are dearest of friends. While Kannan is goofy, fun-loving and naïve; Nandha is somber, serious and responsible. He takes the onus of taking care of Kannan and helping him in all ways which makes Kannan absolutely devoted to Nandha. Teja is in love with Nandha and he reciprocates. Enters Bobby, a well-to-do, sophisticated, intelligent and responsible girl who falls in love with Kannan seeing his goodness. Kannan too loves her but Nandha does not approve without which Kannan won't proceed. Nandha starts to punish Kannan subtly at first and overtly later for maintaining relations with Bobby.

Bobby's family and her brother do not approve of Kannan and tries to get rid of him wherein Nandha steps in to save him. A tug of war over Kannan starts between Bobby and Nandha. Is Nandha's intentions for Kannan pure or is he simply unwilling to forgo his control over him seeing him as a slave? Will Bobby be steadfast or is she simply using him to have fun?

== Cast ==
- Venkat Prabhu as Kannan
- S. P. B. Charan as Nandha
- Meera Vasudevan as Bobby
- Santhoshi as Teja
- Nizhalgal Ravi
- Ilavarasu as Teja's father
- Riyaz Khan
- Paravai Muniyamma
- Anju
- Hari Prashanth as younger Nandha
- Black Pandi as younger Kannan

== Soundtrack ==
The soundtrack was composed by S. P. Balasubrahmanyam, Charan's father, and consists of six songs with lyrics penned by Gangai Amaran, Venkat Prabhu's father. Balasubrahmanyam himself lent his voice for three songs, while noted composers M. S. Viswanathan and Ilaiyaraaja co-sang the first song of the album. Aside from Balasubrahmanyam, his sister S. P. Sailaja and his daughter Pallavi had also performed each one song. The score was composed by Srinivasa Moorthy.

Track listing
No.	Title	Singer(s)	Length
1.	"Natpu Natpu"	M. S. Viswanathan, Ilaiyaraaja, S. P. Balasubrahmanyam	4:06
2.	"Kalluri Vazhvil"	S. P. Sailaja	4:39
3.	"Ippo Ingge"	Venkat Prabhu	5:36
4.	"Kanna Kalakkama"	S. P. Balasubrahmanyam, S. P. Pallavi	5:11
5.	"Oru Vazhippathai"	S. P. Balasubrahmanyam	5:20
6.	"Aala Piranthavanda"	Paravai Muniyamma	0:32
Total length:			25:24

== Reception ==
=== Critical response ===
Malini Mannath of Chennai Online wrote, "A neatly crafted screenplay with some engaging situations, catchy lines, well etched characters, sensitive treatment and some fine performances, all make debutant director Samuthiraikani's maiden directorial effort Unnai Charanadainthein worth watching. Malathi Rangarajan of The Hindu wrote, "It is a pity that the film, racy and absorbing in the first half, gets bogged down and drags in the last forty minutes". Mokkarasu of Kalki praised the acting of Charan, Meera, Venkat Prabhu and Ilavarasu also appreciated humour in first half, Balasubramaniam's music and the film's screenplay for creating tension of whether lovers unite or not but panned characters for speaking lengthy dialogues, double meaning dialogues and Charan's weak reason of separating his friend's love. Screen wrote, "The characters of Venkat Prabhu and Charan are well-etched. Their casualness and at ease in front of the camera with Meera Vasudevan providing an effective foil lifts the film. The director has avoided the usual cliches and has stuck to a slick narration. The climax is a bit too lengthy. The only weak chink in the film is SPB’s music, which is reminiscent of the Illayaraja era. Rajesh Yadav’s cinematography is effective".

=== Awards ===
The film won two Tamil Nadu State Film Awards: Special Prize and Best Story Writer (Samuthirakani).
