= Kumbaari =

- Theatrical release poster
- Directed by: Kevin Joseph
- Written by: Kevin Joseph
- Produced by: Kumaradhas
- Starring: Vijay Vishwa; Naleef Gea; Mahana Sanjeevi; John Vijay
- Cinematography: Prasad Arumugam
- Edited by: T. S. Jay
- Music by: Jeyprakas; Jayden; Prithivy
- Production company: Royal Enterprises
- Distributed by: 9V Studios
- Release date: 5 January 2024
- Country: India
- Language: Tamil

Kumbaari is a 2024 Indian Tamil-language romantic comedy film directed by Kevin Joseph and produced by Kumaradhas. The film stars Vijay Vishwa and Mahana Sanjeevi.

== Cast ==
- Vijay Vishwa
- Naleef Gea
- Mahana Sanjeevi
- John Vijay
- Paruthiveeran Saravanan
- Chaams
- Jangiri Madhumitha
- Senthi Kumari
- Kadhal Sukumar

== Production ==
The film was produced by Kumaradhas under the banner of Royal Enterprises. The cinematography was done by Prasad Arumugam, while editing was handled by T.S.Jai.

== Reception ==
Times Now critic gave 3 out of 5 star and noted that, "The film not only showcases the talent of its cast and crew but also is a poignant exploration of human emotions". Dina Thanthi gave it a positive review.Thinaboomi critic stated "On the whole, Kumari is a film that enjoys nature scenes."
