= Khaki (2007 film) =

Khakhee
- Directed by: Bibin Prabhakar
- Written by: T. A. Shahid
- Produced by: Valiyaveettil Siraj
- Starring: Prithviraj Sukumaran; Mukesh
- Cinematography: Saloo George
- Edited by: Ranjan Abraham
- Music by: Deepak Dev
- Production company: Valiyaveettil Release
- Distributed by: Valiyaveettil Movie International
- Release date: 11 May 2007
- Country: India
- Language: Malayalam

Khakhee is a 2007 Indian Malayalam-language action film, directed by Bibin Prabhakar (in his directorial debut). starring Prithviraj Sukumaran and Mukesh in the lead roles. The film received mixed reviews. The film was shot in Kozhikode.

== Cast ==
- Prithviraj Sukumaran as SI Paduthuveettil Unnikrishnan Nair, Ramakrishnan's younger brother
- Mukesh as Head Constable Paduthuveettil Ramakrishnan Nair, Unnikrishnan's elder brother
- Nawab Shah as Parthiban, the main antagonist
- Nedumudi Venu as Padathuveettil Balakrishnan Nair, Unnikrishnan's and Ramakrishnan's father
- Janardhanan as Bahuleyan
- Jagathy Sreekumar as Karunakaran Nair, Sethulakshmi's father
- Mamukkoya as Constable Chekkutty
- Sudheesh as Advocate Harikrishnan
- Chandra Lakshman as Paduthuveettil Meenakshi Nair, Unnikrishnan's and Ramakrishnan's younger sister
- Meera Vasudev as Sethulakshmi, Ramakrishnan's wife
- Bindu Panicker as Lathika, Harikrishnan's mother
- Kalabhavan Shajohn as Constable Suraj
- Bheeman Raghu as DGP Vikraman IPS
- Kundara Johny as SP Mahesh IPS
- P. Sreekumar as Peethambaran, Chairman
- Subair as Sugunan, advocate
- Santhosh as Sukumaran, member of anti piracy cell
- Santhosh Jogi as Vasudev, party member
- Jayan Cherthala as Jayakumar, md blue moon communications
- Ponnamma Babu as Padmini
- Bindu. C. C as lady constable
- Manasa as TV reporter
