= Niram (2007 film) =

- Directed by: S. K. Krishna
- Written by: S. K. Krishna
- Produced by: Malarvizhi Ramachandran
- Starring: Mani; Sridhar; Raju; Sindhuri
- Cinematography: G. Jeyabalan
- Edited by: A. Joseph
- Music by: Sabesh–Murali
- Production company: Sree Bhagavathi Amman Movies
- Release date: 2 June 2007
- Running time: 130 minutes
- Country: India
- Language: Tamil

Niram (transl. Colour) is a 2007 Indian Tamil-language drama film directed by S. K. Krishna. The film stars newcomers Mani, Sridhar, Raju, Sindhuri, Risha and Payal, with Delhi Ganesh, Santhana Bharathi, Periyar Dasan, Shanmugasundaram, Thadi Balaji and Muthukalai playing supporting roles. The film, produced by Malarvizhi Ramachandran, was released on 4 May 2007.

== Plot ==
Krishna (Mani), Soundar (Sridhar) and Basky (Thadi Balaji) live in a lodge together in Chennai. Krishna aspires to become a film director while Sridhar wants to become a music director. Raju (Raju) who works as a courier boy does his best to take care of his sister and he also helps financially an orphanage. Swetha (Sindhuri), the daughter of the famous film producer Rathnasamy (Santhana Bharathi) and trained in cinematography from London, comes across the three youngsters in different situations and she is impressed by their determination. Swetha decides to make a film with them: Raju is selected to be the hero of the film, Krishna is the director, Sridhar is the composer whereas Swetha is the cinematographer. However, her father Rathnasamy refuses to finance their film citing that it is risky to produce a film made by newcomers. After a long wait, the four eventually find the film producer Kalaisingam (Delhi Ganesh) who has faced a lot of failures recently and they convince him to produce their film in a small budget.

In the past, Soundar was the son of a sangita vidwan and was studying in a music college. One day, he and his parents had a car accident and his parents died on the spot. Krishna who was from a village dropped out of college in Chennai and decided to become a director. His parents who were unhappy with his decision arranged a betrothal with his niece Kokila (Risha): Krishna and Kokila were in love since childhood. Just before the betrothal, Krishna got a call from a producer and went to meet him thus the marriage was cancelled. The producer then withdrew the project and Krishna had no other choice but to become an assistant director.

Back to the present, the four completed the film shooting and their romantic film is named "Niram". In the meantime, Raju and Swetha fall in love with each other. However, the film distributors were not willing to buy their film made by newcomers and Kalaisingam decides to release himself the film. Because of poor marketing and publicity, only a few people have watched their film in the theatre. Their friend Basky suggests showing their film for free for Valentine's Day. The free screening is a huge success and the film gets excellent reviews from the audience, so Rathnasamy decides to buy the film and to release it under his own banner. The friends are happy to finally taste success after so many struggles. The film ends with Krishna reconciling with his lover Kokila.

== Cast ==
- Mani as Krishna
- Sridhar as Soundar
- Raju as Raju
- Sindhuri as Swetha
- Risha as Kokila
- Payal as Heroine (guest appearance)
- Delhi Ganesh as Kalaisingam
- Santhana Bharathi as Rathnasamy
- Periyar Dasan as Krishna's father
- Shanmugasundaram as Church father
- Thadi Balaji as Basky
- Muthukaalai as Muthukalai
- Bayilvan Ranganathan as Film producer
- Crane Manohar as Auto driver
- Kadhal Krishnamoorthy
- Kottachi as Kottachi
- Siva Narayana Murthy as Film producer
- R. Sathish Kumar
- R. Rajesh Kumar
- Srilatha as Kokila's mother
- Pasi Sathya as Krishna's mother
- Abhinayashree in a special appearance

== Soundtrack ==
Niram

Soundtrack album by Sabesh–Murali
- Released: 2007
- Recorded: 2007
- Genre: Feature film soundtrack
- Length: 22:41
- Producer: Sabesh–Murali

The film score and the soundtrack were composed by Sabesh–Murali. The soundtrack features 5 tracks with lyrics written by P. Vijay, Piraisoodan, Muthu Vijayan and Kalaimurugan.

Tracklist
| No. | Title | Singer(s) | Length |
|---|---|---|---|
| 1. | "Poongatril Vasam Varum" | P. Unnikrishnan | 6:03 |
| 2. | "Ganaa Kozhikku" | Malathy Lakshman | 4:00 |
| 3. | "Oru Erimalai" | Tippu | 4:39 |
| 4. | "Ninaivugalale" | Kalyani, Mathangi Jagdish | 5:17 |
| 5. | "Valai Idal" | Prasanna, Kalyani | 2:42 |
| Total length: | | | 22:41 |

== Reception ==
A reviewer wrote, "Director SK Krishna formulated his story on the lines of Pudhu Vasantham. Someone could have told him that it would not work in the present time frame" and concluded, "Niram does not look very bright". Malini Mannath said, "The faces are fresh and the youngsters have played their roles adequately. Mani brings out the anguish and frustration of Krishna creditably. Niram is at most a promising effort from a debutant director". Lajjavathi of Kalki praised Sabesh-Murali's music, Jayabalan's cinematography and added though the concept of struggling in film industry has been witnessed in lot of films, here in this film they tried to show it differently thats all.
