= Karthick Singa =

Tamil film actor

- Born: India
- Years active: 2007–present
- Relatives: Singamuthu (father)

Karthick Singa, previously credited as Vasan Karthik, is an Indian actor in Tamil cinema. He is the son of actor Singamuthu.

== Career ==
Karthick Singa, the son of comedian Singamuthu, made his debut as an actor through Maamadurai (2007) under the stage name of Vasan Karthik. He subsequently signed up for director A. R. Kendran Muniyasamy's Ayyan (2011) opposite Divya Padmini during early 2008. Karthick portrayed a dejected hero who takes to divinity and becomes Ayyan, the village guardian. The film had a delayed release and opened to mixed reviews with a reviewer noting "Vasan Karthik shows potential and his best can be brought out by a good director". In the early 2010s, he worked on a village-based drama titled Nadodi Vamsam opposite Archana Shastry, which eventually did not have a theatrical release.

In 2023, he made a return to acting with the new stage name of Karthick Singa for the film Kodai (2023).

His upcoming movie is Oththa Votu Muthaiah in which he is sharing the screen space with Goundamani and Yogi Babu.

== Personal life ==
Karthick married Priya in a ceremony in Chennai during August 2016.

== Filmography ==
Year	Film	Role	Notes
2007	Maamadurai	Saravanan	
2011	Ayyan	Muniyasami / Ayyan	
2023	Kodai	Bhaskar	
2025	Otha Votu Muthaiya	Guna	
