= Siva Narayana Murthy =

Indian actor

- Born: 5 March 1955
- Died: 7 December 2022 (aged 67); Pattukottai
- Occupation: Comedian
- Years active: 1998-2015
- Children: 3

Pattukottai Sivanarayana Moorthy also known as Siva Narayana Murthy (5 March 1955 – 7 December 2022) was an Indian actor who predominantly worked as a comedian in Tamil films. He mostly appeared in films alongside veteran comedians Vadivelu and Vivek in comedy roles during his acting career. He was also known for his bulk physique appearance, moustache and voice in films.

== Personal life ==
He hailed from Ponnavarayankottai near Pattukkottai in Thanjavur district. he belonged to Zamindar category in the society. He was married to Pushpavalli. He had two sons namely Lokesh and Ramkumar and had a daughter Sreedevi. He died around 8.30 pm on 7 December 2022 at the age of 67 due to a sudden illness in his hometown Pattukottai. His final rites were held in Pattukottai on 8 December 2022.

He had reportedly fallen into a debt trap owing to the debts he took in order to finance his only daughter's marriage. In an interview, he revealed that he was planning to sell his own house in order to repay the borrowed money worth Rs 20 lakh to creditors. However, his daughter reportedly lodged a court case and complaint to prevent his father from selling the house by indicating that she has a share in the house.

== Career ==
During his acting career, he often received minor roles but managed to make an impact in certain film comedy track sequences (usually pairing with Vadivelu and Vivek) despite appearing only for limited screentime. He had often acted in films in the roles of a policeman, textile owner, rowdy, politician and as a village simpleton. He also acted in over 200 films in his career and had also shared screenspace with prominent actors including Rajinikanth, Kamal Haasan, Vijay, Ajith Kumar, Vikram, and Suriya. He had acted in 20 films each with Vadivelu and Vivek.

He was spotted by film director Visu in a function hosted by a Lions Club and Visu cast him in a role in television serial Veeduthorum Vasantham. He made his film acting debut through 1998 film Poonthottam and Shared screenspace alongside Raghuvaran. He initially chose villainous roles before switching to choose comedy roles in films.

== Selected filmography ==
Uncredited roles

- Thamizhan (2002)
- Vaseegara (2003)
- Thithikudhe (2003)
- Inba (2008)

Credited roles

- Poonthottam (1998)
- Padayappa (1999)
- Sri Raja Rajeshwari (2001)
- Star (2001)
- Chocklet (2001)
- Alli Thandha Vaanam (2001)
- Alli Arjuna (2002)
- Pammal K. Sambandam (2002)
- Gemini (2002)
- Unnai Ninaithu (2002)
- Youth (2002)
- Andipatti Arasampatti (2002)
- Ramachandra (2003)
- Aasai Aasaiyai (2003)
- Thennavan (2003)
- Saamy (2003)
- Kadhal Kirukkan (2003)
- Vayasu Pasanga (2004)
- Arul (2004)
- Jananam (2004)
- Chandramukhi (2005)
- Kundakka Mandakka (2005)
- Ayya (2005)
- Anbe Vaa (2005)
- Paramasivan (2006)
- Kai Vandha Kalai (2006)
- Nenjirukkum Varai (2006)
- Thaamirabharani (2007)
- Manikanda (2007)
- Niram (2007)
- En Uyirinum Melana (2007)
- Piragu (2007)
- Pasupathi c/o Rasakkapalayam (2007)
- Thangam (2008)
- Vambu Sandai (2008)
- Azhagu Nilayam (2008)
- Madurai Ponnu Chennai Paiyan (2008)
- Kadhal Endral Enna (2008)
- Azhaipithazh (2008)
- Maanavan Ninaithal (2008)
- Poi Solla Porom (2008)
- Surya (2008)
- Karthik Anitha (2009)
- Pudhiya Payanam (2009)
- Kannukulle (2009)
- Madhavi (2009)
- Theeradha Vilaiyattu Pillai (2010)
- Magizhchi (2010)
- Bhavani (2011)
- Velayudham (2011)
- Medhai (2012)
- Yugam (2012)
- Yaarukku Theriyum (2012)
- Pathayeram Kodi (2013)
- Thalakonam (2014)
- Jaihind 2 (2014)
- Agathinai (2015)
- Vindhai (2015)

=== Television ===
- Chithi
- Veeduthorum Vasantham
- Kolangal
