= Chakkaramaavin Kombathu =

2017 Indian Malayalam-language film

Chakkaramaavin Kombathu is a 2017 Malayalam language film produced by Rajan Chirayil and Jimson Gopal, and directed by Tony Chittettukalam. The film stars Gaurav Menon and Derick Rajan in the lead roles along with Joy Mathew, Harisree Asokan, Meera Vasudeva, Anjali Nair, Bindhu Panickar and Kishore Mathew. The music is composed by Bijipal. The screenplay is based on a story written by Arshad Bathery.

== Plot ==
The film revolves around the life of two children Uthaman and Jenry who are neighbours. Uthaman is from a middle-class family where there is not much time to plan the future. They live happily with all they have like preparing special dishes like ‘Karivepila ittu pollicha meen fry ‘(fish fry) and leading a good family life. On the other hand, Jenry belongs to a high-class family with both of his parents being doctors and leading a very busy professional life. They are not able to find sufficient time to spend with their son. In the meantime, both these children get influenced by a person called Alimammuka who gets their attention for resolving disputes and protecting the beautiful natural environment they dwell in. Though barriers were there for Uthaman and Jenry to become friends due to their family's financial differences, they develop a bond between them and makes an effort to fulfill Alimammuka's dream.

== Cast ==
- Gourav Menon as Uthaman
- Derick Rajan as Jentry
- Joy Mathew as Alimammuka
- Harisree Asokan
- Meera Vasudevan as Dr Lucy
- Kishore Mathew as Dr Thomas
- Anjali Nair as Anjali Aneesh Upasana
- Bijukuttan
- Manoj Guinness
- Indrans
- Bindhu Panickar

== Soundtracks ==
The music is composed by Bijibal and Lyrics by Tony Chittettukalam ("Melemaanathu", "Alanjoriyana") and Rafeeq Ahmed ("Manjaniyum"). Sung by Bijibal, Devadath bijibal, Sreya Jayadeep and Subha Rajesh.

- "Melemaanathu" – Subha Rajesh
- "Alanjoriyana"- Bijibal
- "Manjaniyum" – Devadath bijibal, Sreya Jayadeep
