= Kadhale Jayam =

- Title card
- Directed by: V. Natarajan
- Produced by: V. Natarajan; Rajma Natarajan; Neela Natarajan
- Starring: V. Natarajan; Sudeep; Swathika; Preethi Varma
- Cinematography: Sai Natraj
- Music by: Soundaryan
- Production company: Natajaran Films
- Release date: 30 July 2004
- Country: India
- Language: Tamil

Kadhale Jayam (transl. Love is victorious) is a 2004 Indian Tamil-language romantic comedy film directed by V. Natarajan starring himself, Sudeep, Swathika and Preethi Varma.

== Cast ==
- V. Natarajan as Nataraj
- Sudeep as Aravind
- Swathika as Chitra
- Preethi Varma as Vijayalakshmi a.k.a. Viji
- Vadivelu as Pachaikaalai
- Sneha Nambiar
- Vadivukkarasi as Nataraj's mother
- Vennira Aadai Moorthy as Tea Shop Owner
- O. A. K. Sundar
- Vasu Vikram as Viji's father
- Bonda Mani as Mani
- Anu Mohan
- Vengal Rao
- Halwa Vasu
- Singamuthu
- Gowthami Vembunathan
- Madhan Bob
- Vijay Ganesh
- Kadhal Sukumar
- Chelladurai
- Theni Kunjarammal
- Vellai Subbaiah

== Production ==
V. Natarajan, a Pondicherry businessman, directed, acted and produced the film under his banner Natarajan Films with Sudeep, Swatika and Preethi Varma in other roles. Swathi (changed her name to Swathika for the film), was supposed to play the heroine according to director Natarajan but was given an irrelevant character while Preeti Varma was cast as the heroine. She was mad at the makers of the film for not including her in the film's promotions.

== Soundtrack ==
The music is composed by Soundaryan. Lyrics by V. Natarajan.

- "En Manathu Oram"
- "Chellapa Chellapa"
- "Sight Adicha"
- "Jigu Jigu"

== Reception ==
Malini Mannath of Chennai Online wrote that "But the film has turned out to be not so bad, with a fairly tolerable script and treatment, and with Natarajan playing his role with sincerity. [...] Swatika, neglected by the industry, performs fairly competently her role as Chitra who holds a torch for boss Nataraj. Vadivelu's comedy is enjoyable and is much better than in many of his earlier films".

The film is occasionally shown on Raj TV. After this film, Natarajan was to make a film with a leading Tamil actor, but no film ever materialised. Natajaran later produced and starred in the low-key film Gaja (2009) under the stage name of V. N. R.
