= Decent Parties =

- Directed by: Abraham Lincoln
- Written by: Kaloor Dennis
- Story by: Suresh Krishnan
- Produced by: Vincent Mekkunnel
- Starring: Jagadish; Meera Vasudevan
- Cinematography: Prathapan
- Edited by: P. C. Mohanan
- Music by: Johnson Mangazha
- Production company: Mekkunnel Films
- Distributed by: Mekkunnel Films through Unic Cinemas
- Release date: 2 September 2009
- Country: India
- Language: Malayalam

Decent Parties is a 2009 Malayalam-language film by Abraham Lincoln starring Jagadish.

== Plot ==
Sudheendran is a photographer and runs Padma Studio, a photo studio. His friend Rafeeque, a film production executive, helps him get a chance in films as an assistant cameraman and they discover that Sudheendran also has a talent for script-writing.

Sudheendran gets himself into trouble when his staff Sasi, who is in charge of the photo studio in his absence, mixes a girl's photo with that of another stranger for an advertisement. This creates big issues for the girl, named Sreeja and her marriage, which was fixed earlier, was called off. To resolve this issue, Sudheendran decides to marry Sreeja. Sreeja is a much more practical-minded person while Sudheendran is still amidst his dreams. The film follows how they sort out their differences and end up in a decent life.

== Cast ==
- Jagadish as Sudheendran
- Meera Vasudevan as Sreeja
- Jagathy Sreekumar as Porinju
- Salim Kumar as Rafeeq
- Sai Kumar as Film Producer
- Vijayaraghavan
- Mukesh
- Biju Kuttan
- Tony
- Urmila Unni
- Zeenath
