= Sudeep Sarangi =

Indian actor

- Occupation: Actor
- Years active: 2003–present

Sudeep Sarangi is an Indian actor who acts in Bengali, Hindi, and Tamil-language films and Hindi-language television shows. He is known for his role in Kaadhal Kondein (2003).

== Career ==
He made his debut with the Tamil-language film Kaadhal Kondein (2003) as the antagonist. After the success of the film, Sudeep starred in Ennavo Pudichirukku (2004) and Kadhale Jayam (2005) in similar roles. These films, however, unlike his first film released to negative reviews. However, he worked in a business firm after a period of debt when his father became ill and his brother's business wasn't doing well. He was later offered roles in the Hindi television series Prithviraj Chauhan, Baba Aiso Varr Dhoondo, and Mahadev. He had a brief role in Sahara One's Haunted Nights.

== Filmography ==
Films

Year	Film	Role	Language	Notes
2003	Kaadhal Kondein	Aadhi Kesavan	Tamil	
2004	Ennavo Pudichirukku	Santosh	Tamil	
2004	Kadhale Jayam	Aravind	Tamil	
2005	Tomake Selam	Handicapped man	Bengali	
2013	Prem Juddho		Bengali	
2015	Guddu Ki Gun	Akhilesh Tripathi	Hindi	
2018	Missing	Bellboy	Hindi	

Television

Year	Title	Role	Notes
2006 - 2009	Prithviraj Chauhan	Arjun	
2010 - 2012	Baba Aiso Varr Dhoondo	Sudheer	
2011 - 2014	Mahadev	Shatbhish	
2012	Haunted Nights	Rahul Bhatt	Appeared in the episode "Jaadu Tona Guest House"
2013	Shaitaaan - A Criminal Mind		
2013	Savdhaan India	Jitendra (Episode 121) / Chetan Pandey (Episode 979) / Mahendra Sharma (Episode 1030) / Gagan (Episode 1165) / Pramod, Courier man, Serial Killer (Episode No 1919)	
2014	Crime Patrol		One episode
2017	CID	Pawan Kumar/Kailash (Episode 1401)	Episodic roles
2018	CID	Manish (Episode 1531)	Episodic roles
2022	Durga Aur Charu	Bankey	
2025–2026	Gharwali Pedwali	Tillumal	

== Plays ==
- Baghdad Ka Ghulam
- Bhagwat Ajjukyyam
