= Arivumani =

- DVD cover
- Directed by: M. A. Kennedy
- Written by: M. A. Kennedy
- Produced by: M. K. Srinivasan
- Starring: Murali; Meera Vasudevan
- Cinematography: Kasi Vishwa
- Edited by: Mohan-Subbu
- Music by: Janakiraj
- Production company: Winner Creations
- Release date: 10 August 2004
- Running time: 145 minutes
- Country: India
- Language: Tamil

Arivumani is a 2004 Indian Tamil-language drama film directed by M. A. Kennedy. The film stars Murali and Meera Vasudevan.

== Plot ==
A carefree youth Arivumani loses his wife in an accident. Later, he finds a child 'Ice Kutti' and takes care of her, what all he went through and how he solved the child's issues forms the rest of the story.

== Cast ==
- Murali as Arivumani
- Meera Vasudevan as N. S. K. Priya
- Shreesha
- Shabnam
- Ramesh Khanna as Peon Thangasamy
- Devan as Mariyanayagam
- Manikka Vinayagam as N. S. Krishnan
- Pandu as Police Inspector
- Balu Anand as Police Inspector
- T. P. Gajendran as Thangasamy's house owner
- Bayilvan Ranganathan
- Ennathe Kannaiah as Police Officer
- Thideer Kannaiah as Police Officer
- Chaplin Balu as Doctor (uncredited)
- Paravai Muniyamma (special appearance in the song "Kiyan Kiyang")

== Production ==
The film marked the directorial debut of M. A. Kennedy, previously an assistant to Agathiyan and earlier wrote scripts for films like Pistha (1997) and Minsara Kanna (1999). The film introduced Kasi Vishwa as cinematographer who earlier assisted N. K. Viswanathan. The film was entirely shot in Ooty.

== Soundtrack ==
The music was composed by Janakiraj and released on Ayngaran.

All lyrics are written by Kalai Kumar.

Track listing
No.	Title	Singer(s)	Length
1.	"Kettapayya"	S. P. Balasubrahmanyam	4:30
2.	"Kiyan Kiyang"	Manikka Vinayagam, Paravai Muniyamma (Kundrathile Kumaranukku Kondattam portions)	4:49
3.	"Pachaikili Paaduthoru"	Ganga	4:53
4.	"Pagal Thiruda"	P. Unnikrishnan, Anuradha Sriram	4:34
5.	"Poopol"	Karthik, Harini	3:52
Total length:			22:38
