= Vijay Vishwa =

Indian actor

- Born: Madurai
- Occupation: Actor
- Years active: 2012–present

Vijay Vishwa (formerly known as Abi Saravanan) is an Indian actor, who has appeared in Tamil language films. He has acted in films including Touring Talkies (2015) and Saahasam (2016).

== Career ==
After completing a degree in engineering, Vijay Vishwa wanted to become an actor and began looking for opportunities to enter the film industry. initially played small supporting roles in Attakathi (2012) and Kutti Puli (2013). He successfully auditioned for the lead role in S. S. Kumaran's film, Kerala Nattilam Pengaludane (2014) and portrayed a young man looking for a bride in his film. His second film was Touring Talkies (2015), where he portrayed the younger version of S. A. Chandrasekhar's character. He later appeared in a supporting role in Prashanth's Saahasam (2016).

In 2015, he worked on several small budget films titled Plus or Minus directed by newcomer Jai, the horror film Irayan by Saravanan Periasamy, Andha Oru Naal and Nadakkam.

In November 2016, Abi went to Nagapattinam District to help the people who had affected by Gaja Cyclone. In 2019 Abi Saravanan also helped flood affected people in Assam. In 2021, he changed his name to Vijay Vishwa.

== Filmography ==
Year	Film	Role	Notes
2012	Attakathi		Uncredited role
2013	Kutti Puli		Uncredited role
2014	Kerala Nattilam Pengaludane	Unni Krishnan	
2015	Touring Talkies	Young Anthony	Anthology film; segment Love @ 75
2016	Saagasam	Kothandapani	
2016	Pattathaari	Siva	
2019	Bigil	John	
2020	Maayanadhi	Senthil	
2022	Kombu Vatcha Singamda		
2022	Saayam	Marudhu	
2024	Kumbaari		
2025	Flashback		Only the Hindi dubbed version was released.
2025	Saaraa	Mahesh	
