= Ennavo Pudichirukku =

- Directed by: Meenakshi Sundaram
- Written by: Meenakshi Sundaram; G. Prakash (dialogues)
- Produced by: S. Sriskandarajah
- Starring: Sudeep; Bharani; Sindhuri
- Cinematography: Sainatra
- Edited by: M. Saikrishnan
- Music by: Subhash Jawahar
- Production company: SSS Good Look Films
- Release date: 26 February 2004
- Running time: 100 minutes
- Country: India
- Language: Tamil

Ennavo Pudichirukku (transl. Something I like) is a 2004 Tamil language romantic thriller film directed by Meenakshi Sundaram. The film stars Kaadhal Kondein fame Sudeep, newcomer Bharani and Sindhuri, with Karunas, Bhuvaneswari, Vittal Rao, S. Sriskandarajah, Madhan Bob, and Kovai Sarala playing supporting roles. The film, produced by S. Sriskandarajah, was released on 26 February 2004. The film's title is based on a verse from the song "Pudichirukku" from Saamy (2003).

== Plot ==
Santosh (Sudeep) and Vishwa (Bharani) are brothers with different personalities. They are the sons of Muthaiah (Vittal Rao), a rich NRI businessman. Santosh is a chronic womanizer who believes that money is enough to attract women. Vishwa, on the other hand, is responsible and works in his father's company and believes love is pure and beautiful.

Vishwa and Sangeetha (Sindhuri) fall in love with each other. Sangeetha is from a middle-class family. She lives with her docile brother (S. Sriskandarajah) and her greedy sister-in-law Saroja (Bhuvaneswari). One day, Santosh falls under the spell of Sangeetha and tries to woo her. Sangeetha, annoyed by his crudeness, slaps him in a public place. Santosh, who has never been humiliated like this before, swears that he will marry her and will make her suffer after the marriage. Santosh then pays her sister-in-law Saroja to fulfil his wish.

Later, Santosh realizes that his brother Viswa and Sangeetha are lovers, but even after knowing it, Santosh is determined to make Sangeetha his own. What transpires next forms the rest of the story.

== Cast ==
- Sudeep as Santosh
- Bharani as Vishwa
- Sindhuri as Sangeetha
- Karunas as Peela Magan
- Bhuvaneswari as Saroja
- Vittal Rao as Muthaiah
- S. Sriskandarajah as Sangeetha's brother
- Madhan Bob
- Kovai Senthil as Gurukkal
- Vellai Subbaiah as Iyer
- Vijay Ganesh as Tea Master
- Radha Rani as Annapoorani
- Nindhu as Aishwarya
- Madurai Selvam
- Chelladurai
- Neepa

== Production ==
S. Sriskandarajah, an NRI businessman from Norway had ventured into a Tamil film Ennavo Pudichirukku. Sudeep, who signed to play the lead role, said, "After Kaadhal Kondein I got many offers. I was waiting for a meaty role, which I finally got in this film. Its a challenging role for me". Sindhuri who played the second heroine in Boys is doing the female lead. Bharani, an NRI from Canada was introduced as the second hero. Subhash Jawahar debuted as the music director. The film's songs had been shot at picturesque locales of Pondicherry, Munnar, Chalakudy and Chennai while a motorbike race was picturised at Irungattukottai.

== Soundtrack ==
Ennavo Pudichirukku

Soundtrack album by Subhash Jawahar
- Released: 2004
- Recorded: 2004
- Genre: Feature film soundtrack
- Length: 15:24
- Producer: Subhash Jawahar

The film score and the soundtrack were composed by Subhash Jawahar. The soundtrack, released in 2004, features 5 tracks with lyrics written by Rasi Azhagappan, Sukumar, Bharathi Priyan and Ilayakumar.

Track	Song	Singer(s)	Duration
1	"Azhagu Azhage"	Kalaikumar	3:38
2	"Vaada Vaada"	Kalaikumar, Lalitha Jawahar	3:40
3	"Iru Vizhi"	Nithyasree Mahadevan	2:34
4	"Thithike Thithike"	Tippu, Sujatha Mohan	3:03
5	"Kasuku"	Karthik, Sujatha Mohan	2:29

== Reception ==
The film received negative reviews from critics. Another critic from bizhat.com said, "Sudeep has impressed in the villain role. Newcomer Bharani is ok. Sindhuri’s acting stands out especially in the scene when she is torn between the two brothers". Chennai Online wrote "No big names to boast of, and a debutant director at the helm, one didn't expect much from the film. But then one didn't expect such mediocre fare either! Neither is the script interesting nor is the treatment inspiring".
