= Super Da =

- Directed by: Azhagu Raja Sundaram
- Written by: V. Prabhakar (dialogues)
- Screenplay by: Azhagu Raja Sundaram
- Produced by: B. Sampoornam
- Starring: Ramki; Kunal; Anusha; Livingston; Sindhuri; Telangana Shakuntala; Paravai Muniyamma
- Cinematography: A. Jerald
- Edited by: Mohan - Subbu
- Music by: Deva
- Production company: Sree Ashtalakshmi Films
- Release date: 25 June 2004
- Running time: 130 minutes
- Country: India
- Language: Tamil

Super Da (transl. Its super, man) is a 2004 Indian Tamil-language comedy drama film directed by Azhagu Raja Sundaram. The film stars Ramki, Kunal and newcomer Anusha, with Livingston, Sindhuri, Telangana Shakuntala, and Paravai Muniyamma playing supporting roles. The film, produced by Anusha's mother B. Sampoornam, was released on 25 June 2004.

== Plot ==
Kathirvel comes to the city to live with his friend Subramani. While Reshma is a soft-spoken college student, her mother Gangamma is a heartless lady rowdy. Rahul, a college student, falls in love with Reshma at the first sight. Reshma also loves him but to save Rahul's life, she tries to avoid him. Finally, Reshma accepts his love. Gangamma, knowing their love affair, hurts Rahul heavily in front of Kathirvel and Subramani. They rush him to the nearby hospital. Reshma insults Kathirvel for being passive during the attack following which he tells his tragic past to Reshma. In the past, Kathirvel was in love with Reshma's sister Meenakshi. So Gangamma tried to kill Kathirvel but Meenakshi intervened and was accidentally killed by her mother. Before her death, Kathirvel promised Meenakshi to not kill her mother. Kathirvel is now determined to unite the lovers. What transpires later forms the crux of the story.

== Cast ==
- Ramki as Kathirvel
- Kunal as Rahul
- Anusha as Reshma
- Livingston as Subramani
- Sindhuri as Meenakshi
- Telangana Shakuntala as Gangamma
- Paravai Muniyamma as Muniyamma
- Senthil
- Vaiyapuri
- Manorama as Rasathi's father
- Ambika
- Anuradha
- Shakeela as Meera Krishnan
- Sharmili as Sarasu
- Abhinayashree
- Ponnambalam
- Balu Anand
- Anu Mohan
- Uday Prakash
- K. Babu as a doctor
- V. S. Balamurugan as a postman
- C. J. Muthukumar as a marriage broker
- Azhagu Raja Sundaram as a snake charmer
- Aravind Akash in a guest appearance

== Production ==
The film was originally announced with Sathyaraj and Jai Akash as lead actors however Sathyaraj opted out of the film as he was unwilling to work in multiple hero subjects. Some scenes were shot in Chennai, at the Besant Nagar beach and on Anna Salai.

== Soundtrack ==
Super Da

Soundtrack album by Deva
- Released: 21 May 2004
- Recorded: 2004
- Genre: Feature film soundtrack
- Length: 24:35
- Producer: Deva

The film score and the soundtrack were composed by Deva. The soundtrack, released on 21 May 2004, features 5 tracks with lyrics written by Kalidasan, Piraisoodan, Kalai Kumar, Tholkapiyan and Victordas.

Track	Song	Singer(s)	Lyrics	Duration
1	"Koyambedu"	Anuradha Sriram, Manikka Vinayagam	Kalidasan	5:11
2	"Iduppu Madippu"	Mathangi Jagdish, Tippu	Piraisoodan	4:32
3	"Ichu Thaa"	Shankar Mahadevan, Malathy Lakshman	Victordas	4:13
4	"Engappavukku"	Malathy Lakshman	Tholkapiyan	5:19
5	"Thulasi Chediyoram"	Anuradha Sriram	Kalai Kumar	5:20
