= Meera Vasudevan =

Indian actress, model

- Born: Bombay, Maharashtra, India
- Other name: Meera Vasudev
- Occupations: Actress; model
- Years active: 1999–present
- Spouses: Vishal Agarwal (m. 2005; div. 2008); John Kokken (m. 2012; div. 2016); Vipin Puthiyankam (m. 2024; div. 2025)
- Children: 1

Meera Vasudevan is an Indian actress, who has mainly appeared in films and TV soap's in Malayalam, Tamil, Hindi and Telugu language. She received the Tamil Nadu State Film Award Special Prize in 2005 and the Kerala State Television Award for Best Actress in 2007. She is well known for her role Sumithra in the Malayalam soap opera Kudumbavilakku on Asianet . She also played role of Sujatha in Madhuranombarakattu on Zee Keralam.

== Early life ==
Meera was born in Mumbai, Maharashtra in a Tamil family as the eldest daughter to Vasudevan and Hemalatha. She has a younger sister Ashwini, who shot to fame as a child artist for Jaanam Samjha Karo, a Salman Khan starrer. After graduating with a bachelor's degree in arts, Psychology and English literature, she became a successful model, appearing in many ad films, shooting into fame. The ICC setmax campaign was her call to success and marked her entry into acting.

== Career ==
Her entry into the film industry happened through the 2003 Hindi satirical film Rules: Pyaar Ka Superhit Formula, alongside Milind Soman. After about 4 years of failed screen tests, the Setmax ad shot by Prahlad Kakkar won the best ad campaign of the year, and was noticed by the director Parvati Balagopalan's mother and got her a screen test for Rules: Pyaar Ka Superhit Formula, for which she was nominated for best upcoming actress by Screen Awards and Sansui – PNC Awards. Her Telugu film Golmaal , however, released first. The same year she made her film debut in the Tamil film industry as well, appearing in Samuthirakani's directorial debut Unnai Saranadainthen, in which she shared screen space with Venkat Prabhu and S. P. B. Charan. Her portrayal of Bobby, an adamant village girl, in the film, was appreciated by critics and earned her the Tamil Nadu State Film Special Award for Best Actress.

After unsuccessful films like Anjali I Love You in Telugu and Arivumani in Tamil, she stepped into the Malayalam film industry in 2005 with the Blessy-directed Thanmathra, alongside Malayalam actor Mohanlal. Her performance as Lekha Ramesan, a housewife and mother of two children, received positive reviews and she received the Best Female New Face Award at the 2005 Ujala-Asianet Awards.

In 2006, she again starred in a Hindi film, Jaadu Sa Chal Gayaa, after 3 years, following which she appeared in the Tamil comedy film Jerry as a police inspector and the Malayalam drama film Oruvan, in which she again enacted the role of a housewife. Meera next starred in a number of Malayalam-language films, which include Ekantham, Valmeekam and Kaakki and two Hindi-language films, Chain Kulii Ki Main Kulii and Thodi Life Thoda Magic in 2007. Simultaneously she made her television debut in Tamil and Malayalam with Penn and Kanalpoovu respectively . The later series earned her the Kerala State Television Award for Best Actress making her a prominent figure in television and films along Malayali audience.

In 2009, she had three releases, the Malayalam-language films Orkkuka Vallappozhum, Decent Parties and Vairam: Fight for Justice, in which she portrayed a Malayali housewife, whose daughter gets molested and killed. The fourth release was Aattanayagan, co-starring Sakthi Vasu and Remya Nambeeshan. After a hiatus she made her comeback to Malayalam films in 2017 with Chakkaramaavin Kombathu and later portrayed notable roles in offbeat films like Silence, appuvinte sathyanveshanam, Paykappal and Panigrahanam. In 2020, she moved her focus to television playing the female lead Sumithra in Malayalam television serial Kudumbavilakku on Asianet and antagonist in Tamil series Chithi 2 on Sun TV which rose her popularity again among the south Indian audience.

== Personal life ==
Meera married Vishal Agarwal, son of cinematographer Ashok Kumar in 2005. They divorced in July 2010. In 2012, she married Malayalam actor John Kokken, with whom she has a son and got separated in 2016. Meera married Vipin Puthiyankam in 2024. In 2025, they got divorced.

== Filmography ==
Key
†	Denotes films that have not yet been released

List of Meera Vasudevan film credits
Year	Title	Role	Language	Notes
2003	Golmaal	Meenakshi Narahari	Telugu	
2003	Rules: Pyaar Ka Superhit Formula	Radha	Hindi	
2003	Unnai Saranadainthen	Bobby	Tamil	Won - Tamil Nadu State Film Special Award for Best Actress
2004	Anjali I Love You	Anjali	Telugu	
2004	Arivumani	Priya	Tamil	
2005	Thanmathra	Lekha Ramesan	Malayalam	Won - Asianet Award for Best Female New Face of the Year
2006	Jaadu Sa Chal Gayaa	Nandini	Hindi	
2006	Hello? Kaun Hai!	Nandi	Hindi	
2006	Jerry	Jeeva	Tamil	
2006	Oruvan	Jaya Bharathan	Malayalam	
2007	Ekantham	Dr. Sophie	Malayalam	
2007	Kaakki	Sethulakshmi Ramakrishnan	Malayalam	
2007	Chain Kulii Ki Main Kulii	Malini	Hindi	
2008	Thodi Life Thoda Magic	Naina	Hindi	
2008	Thasaiyinai Thee Sudinum		Tamil	
2008	Kathi Kappal	Saaral Parivallal	Tamil	
2008	Pachamarathanalil	Maala	Malayalam	
2008	Gulmohar	Chithra	Malayalam	
2009	Orkkuka Vallappozhum	Sethu's mother	Malayalam	
2009	Decent Parties	Sreeja Sudheendran	Malayalam	
2009	Vairam: Fight for Justice	Devi Sivarajan	Malayalam	
2009	13B: Fear Has a New Address	Serial actress	Hindi	Hindi-Tamil bilingual film; Hindi version only
2010	Aattanayagan	Indra	Tamil	
2010	Kumari Pennin Ullathile	Sumithra	Tamil	
2012	Kochi	Savithri	Malayalam	
2012	916	Chandrika	Malayalam	
2012	Jaanleva Black Blood		Hindi	
2016	Sahapadi 1975 (Valmeekam)	Krishnapriya	Malayalam	
2017	Chakkaramaavin Kombathu	Dr.Lucy	Malayalam	
2018	Painting Life	Wife	English	
2018	Adanga Maru	Subash's Sister-in-law	Tamil	
2019	Kuttymama	Senior Anjali	Malayalam	
2019	Lessons	Devika Menon	Malayalam	Segment: Panigrahanam
2019	Thakkol	Jaceentha Morris Vas	Malayalam	
2020	Silencer	Thresia	Malayalam	
2021	Appuvinte Sathyanweshanam	Anitha	Malayalam	
2022	Payakappal	Rani	Malayalam	
2023	Kirkkan	Sethu Lakshmi	Malayalam	
2023	Imbam	Mythili Swaminathan	Malayalam	
2023	Karutha	Karutha	Malayalam	
2025	Am Ah	Anju	Malayalam	
2025	Get-Set Baby	Dr. Shanti Prasannan	Malayalam	
2025	United Kingdom of Kerala	Maria	Malayalam	
2026	Kalyanamaram		Malayalam	
2026	Disco †		Malayalam	

== Television ==
=== Serials ===
List of Meera Vasudevan television serials credits
Year	Title	Role	Language	Channel	Notes
2001–02	Kaveri	Pallavi	Tamil	Sun TV	
2002	Devi	Uma	Hindi	Sony India	
2003	Subah Savere	Herself	Hindi	DD National	
2006	Penn	Deepa/Anjali	Tamil	Sun TV	
2007	Kanalpoovu	Suhasini	Malayalam	Jeevan TV	Won - Kerala State Television Award for Best Actress
2007–08	Suryavamsam	Rajakumari	Tamil	Sun TV	
2020–2024	Kudumbavilakku	Sumithra	Malayalam	Asianet	
2020	Chithi 2	Mallika Devi	Tamil	Sun TV	Replaced by Sirisha
2020	Avarodoppam Aliyum Achayanum	Sumithra	Malayalam	Asianet	Telefilm
2020	Mounaragam	Sumithra	Malayalam	Asianet	Episodes: 145–147, cameo as Roopa's friend
2020	Pournami Thinkal	Sumithra	Malayalam	Asianet	Episodes: 384–385, cameo as Pournami's client
2023	Koodevide	Sumithra	Malayalam	Asianet	Episode: 601, cameo
2023	Geeta Govindam	Sumithra	Malayalam	Asianet	Episode: 90, cameo
2024-2025	Madhuranombarakattu	Sujatha	Malayalam	Zee Keralam	
2025–present	Anju Sundarikal	Reena	Malayalam	Sun Surya	

=== Shows ===
List of Meera Vasudevan television shows credits
Year	Title	Role	Language	Channel
2008	Aatam Paatam	Host	Tamil	Kalaignar TV
2017	Comedy Super Nite	Herself	Malayalam	Flowers TV
2017	JB Junction	Herself	Malayalam	Kairali TV
2017	Star Chat	Herself	Malayalam	Kairali News
2017	I Personally	Herself	Malayalam	Kappa TV
2017	Pularvela	Herself	Malayalam	Manorama News
2018	Lal Salam	Herself	Malayalam	Amrita TV
2018	Snehapoorvam Meera Vasudev	Herself	Malayalam	Kaumudy TV
2020	Christmas Tharamelam	Herself	Malayalam	Asianet
2021	Start Music Season 3	Promo Anchor; Participant	Malayalam	Asianet
2021	Saregamapa Little Champs	Celebrity Judge	Malayalam	Zee Keralam
2022	Start Music Season 4	Participant	Malayalam	Asianet
2022	Red Carpet	Mentor	Malayalam	Amrita TV
2023	Stae Night with Maveli	Sumitra	Malayalam	Asianet

=== Commercials ===
Commercials appeared in from 2003 till present date

- Videocon internet TV with Shah Rukh Khan by UTV, Deven Khote
- Fair & Lovely by Nirvana films, Prakash Varma
- Kenstar by Red ice prodn, E. Niwas
- Knorr soup by mindscreen, Rajiv Menon
- ICC World Cup Cricket Rangoli by genesis prodns, Prahlad Kakkar
- Reliance R-World with Virendra Sehwag by Apocalypse films; Pradeep Sarcar
- Coke with Vikram by mindscreen, Rajiv Menon
- Fair & Lovely Talc by UTV, Deven Khote
- Chennai Silks by J.D. & Jerry
- Surf Excel by VKP, Trends
- Alpenliebe by Keroscene films
- Pears junior by Black Magic prodns
- Pilsbury '2010 feb (now on air) by Narayan, for Fingerprint films
- Hosting Discovery travel and living, Indian rendezvous with Chennai as the celebrity anchor for Discovery Channel
- Pankajakasthuri Breathe Eazy
- Setmax
- Kodak
- Kudumbashree
- Vanitha Magazine
- Arogya Masika
- Kaarthika - Hairwash powder
- Hyra Foods

== Awards ==
Kerala State Television Awards

- 2007 : Kerala State Television Award for Best Actor in a Lead role - Female - Kanalpoovu
