= Bharathi Kannan =

Indian film director and actor

- Born: 1 June 1962 (age 64)
- Occupation: Film director
- Years active: 1996–present

Bharathi Kannan is an Indian film distributor, director and actor, who predominantly worked in Tamil-language films. He was primarily active in the 1990s and early 2000 and is most noted for his work on devotional films.

== Career ==
He started his career in 1981, joining as an assistant director to Nellai Sunderrajan and went on to continue such roles for the next fifteen years, while appearing in a few supporting roles as actor notably in Nethiyadi and Jadikketha Moodi (1989). He then apprenticed for a series of films under director K. Shankar, while looking for a producer for his first script. Meanwhile, he also worked as a distributor for films, releasing Guna and Pandiyan in Tirunelveli.

Bharathi Kannan made his first film Aruva Velu in 1996 and won average reviews for his work. He was given the opportunity to produce a medium budget action film Thirunelveli (2000) by R. B. Choudary featuring Prabhu in the lead role, but the film became a box office failure. He then made a series of Hindu devotional films Sri Raja Rajeshwari (2001) and Sri Bannari Amman (2002), with a critic labelling the latter as "terrible", noting that "the director of the film has specialised in making such films, which is meant for illiterates."

In 2004, he directed Vayasu Pasanga, a coming-of-age story of youngsters though critics gave the film's negative reviews with a reviewer noting "after directing some devotionals, Bharathi Kannan tries his hand at a different subject. But if this is the stuff he has to offer, he would do better to stick to his socio-religious genre". He later started making a film titled Kaadhal Kaaviyam starring Livingston and Vindhya, but the film was later stalled.

His most recent directorial venture in Tamil was Karagattakkari which went unnoticed and Bharathikannan opted against directing any films and started acting in supporting roles in films and television serials notably Kolangal and Rajakumari.

== Filmography ==
=== Director ===
Year	Film	Language	Notes
1996	Aruva Velu	Tamil	
1998	Kannathal	Tamil	
2000	Thirunelveli	Tamil	
2001	Sri Raja Rajeshwari	Tamil	
2002	Sri Bannari Amman	Tamil	Partially reshot in Telugu as Maha Chandi
2003	Vijaya Dashami	Kannada	Partially reshot in Tamil as Thaaye Bhuvaneswari
2004	Vayasu Pasanga	Tamil	
2005	Karagattakkari	Tamil	
2005	Love Story	Kannada	Dubbed in Tamil as Uyirullavarai

=== Actor ===
Year	Film	Role	Notes
1989	Nethiyadi		Uncredited role
1989	Jadikketha Moodi		Uncredited role
1998	Kannathal	Babu (Suicide victim)	
2003	Thaaye Bhuvaneswari	Doctor	
2004	Vayasu Pasanga	Samy	
2005	Kasthuri Maan		
2005	Karagattakkari		
2005	Pesuvoma	Doctor	
2007	Maya Kannadi		
2008	Thiruvannamalai	Pandian	
2010	Kacheri Arambam	Kerala astrologer	
2010	Singam	Police inspector	
2014	Kayal	Inspector	
2015	Adhibar	Parameswaran	
2015	Savaale Samaali		
2015	The Yellow Festival	Viswanathan	Short film
2016	Marudhu		
2016	Thodari		
2017	Pa. Pandi	Poongodi's father	
2017	Podhuvaga Emmanasu Thangam	Bhanu Prakash	
2018	Mannar Vagaiyara		
2018	Pakka	Priest	
2023	Aayiram Porkaasukal	Police Inspector Muthu	
2024	Lal Salaam	Police Inspector	
2026	Idhayam Murali	Adithi's uncle	

== Television ==
Year	Title	Role	Serial
2009	Kolangal	Minister Sankara Pandiyan	Sun TV
2009–2011	Madhavi		Sun TV
2013	Rajakumari	Cool Pandi	Sun TV
2013–2014	Madipakkam Madhavan	Vasudevan	Kalaignar TV
2013–2015	Pasamalar	Kaliappan	Sun TV
2019–2023	Pandavar Illam	Athiveerapandian	Sun TV
2022–present	Ethirneechal	Kovai Subaiah	Sun TV
2022	Porantha Veeda Puguntha Veeda (Special Show)	Himself	Sun TV
2023	Maari		Zee Tamil
2024–2026	Manamagale Vaa	Chidamabaram	Sun TV
