= Maayanadhi =

2020 Indian Tamil drama film

- Film poster
- Directed by: Ashok Thiagarajan
- Written by: Ashok Thiagarajan
- Produced by: Ashok Thiagarajan
- Starring: Venba; Aadukalam Naren; Abi Saravanan; Appukutty
- Cinematography: Srinivas Devamsam
- Edited by: Gopi Krishna
- Music by: Bhavatharini
- Production company: Raji Nila Mukil Films
- Release date: 31 January 2020
- Running time: 120 minutes
- Country: India
- Language: Tamil

Maayanadhi (transl. Mystic river) is a 2020 Indian Tamil language drama film written, produced, and directed by Ashok Thiagarajan in his directorial debut. The film stars Venba, Aadukalam Naren, Abi Saravanan and Appukutty in the lead roles. The music was composed by Bhavatharini with cinematography by Srinivas Devamsam and editing by Gopi Krishna. The film released on 31 January 2020.

Maayanadhi was dubbed in Telugu as Mayanathi in 2026.

== Cast ==
- Venba as Kousalya
- Aadukalam Naren as Kowsalya's father
- Abi Saravanan as Senthil
- Appukutty as Mani
- Thamizh Venkat as Kowsalya's uncle
- Kantharaj as Jayachandran
- Durga Venugopal as Headmistress Martina
- Rudhran as Vanakkar
- Sivaprakasam as Senthil's father
- Vijayasri as Malini Miss

== Production ==
This project was officially launched in February 2018, Ashok Thiagarajan is making his debut as the Director and producer of the venture, under his newly established Raji Nila Mukil Films (RNM FILMS) Productions banner. Actors include Venba, Abi Saravanan and Aadukalam Naren, with Appukutty signed to play the lead role.

Bhavatharani was selected as music director. Meanwhile, Srinivas Devamsam, Gopi Krishna, and Mayil Krishnan was signed as cinematographer, editor, and art director respectively for this film. Maayanadhi planning to release on 31 January 2020.

== Soundtrack ==
Soundtrack was composed by Bhavatharini. Yuvan Shankar Raja and Ameer attended the audio launch as chief guests.

- Ganja Paarvai - Senthildas, Priyanka
- Mayil Iragu - Priya Mali
- Yaavum Ingu - Srisha

== Release ==
The Times of India gave the film two out of five stars and stated that "A better script would have helped them [the cast of the film] more". The Asian Age gave the film two-and-a-half out of five stars and wrote that " A taut narration and a little more coherence would have enhanced the film".
