= Sindhuri =

Indian actress

- Born: Chennai, India
- Other names: Jenny (2019–present)
- Years active: 2003–present

Sindhuri is an Indian actress who has worked in the Tamil, Telugu and Malayalam film industries. After making her debut in the Tamil film Boys (2003), she has been in films including Super Da (2004) and Gundamma Gaari Manavadu (2007).

== Career ==
Sindhuri began her acting career by portraying a supporting role in Shankar's Boys (2003), where she appeared as one of the four friends of Genelia D'Souza who get courted by the film's titular characters. Portraying the role of a North Indian hipster girl opposite Bharath, the success of the film saw her gain offers to play leading roles in Mumtaj's production Thathi Thavadhu Manasu (2003) and Ennavo Pudichirukku (2004). The two films had low key releases, and despite playing diverse roles of a village girl and a college student, Sindhuri was unable to get a break to work on bigger films. Her following films also failed to establish her as an actress with Super Da (2004) and Niram, having a limited release. During the period she was also cast in Unarchigal (2006) but eventually did not feature, while other films including Kannamapettai and Flowers opposite Vaseegaran were stalled midst production.

She appeared in the successful Telugu comedy film Gundamma Gaari Manavadu (2007) opposite director Ali, with the film remaining her biggest success as an actress in a leading role. She also forayed into the Malayalam film industry, with Shambu, originally shot in 2004, having a theatrical release in 2008. In December 2008, Sindhuri expressed her interest in gaining more roles to work in Tamil films and took part in glamorous photoshoots, while also expressing her interest to feature in item numbers.

== Filmography ==
- Note: all films are in Tamil, unless otherwise noted.

Year	Film	Role	Notes
2003	Boys	Ankitha	
2003	Thathi Thavadhu Manasu	Amudha	
2004	Ennavo Pudichirukku	Sangeetha	
2004	Super Da	Meenakshi	
2007	Gundamma Gaari Manavadu	Mahalakshmi	Telugu film
2007	Niram	Swetha	
2008	Shambu	Aparna	Malayalam film
2013	Kadhal Kilukiluppu	Uma Maheswari	
2019	Boomerang	Shakti's friend	
2023	The Great Indian Kitchen	Climax Wife	
2023	Irumban	Setji's Daughter	
