= Andipatti Arasampatti =

- Directed by: Danajaya
- Written by: Dananjaya (AK) Ramesh Krish
- Produced by: S. Thamizh Raja
- Starring: Pandiarajan; Mansoor Ali Khan; Manorama; Vilasini; Senthil; Alex
- Cinematography: Ravi Sreenivas
- Edited by: V. M. Uthayasankar
- Music by: Rock Rownder
- Production company: Meena Cine Combines
- Release date: 4 November 2002
- Running time: 120 minutes
- Country: India
- Language: Tamil

Andipatti Arasampatti is a 2002 Indian Tamil-language comedy film directed by Dananjaya. The film stars Pandiarajan and Mansoor Ali Khan. It was released on 4 November 2002. The film is loosely based on the 1989 American film See No Evil, Hear No Evil.

== Plot ==
Andipatti, a blind man, and Arasampatti, a deaf man, become friends. Their misadventures as they get caught in a smuggling operation and a murder. Chased by a bungling police duo, and hounded by the anti-social elements who believe the heroes have their priceless Anthrax with which they had planned to destroy the state's population, it is about how Andipatti and Arasampatti extricate themselves from the situation they had inadvertently landed themselves in.

== Cast ==
- Pandiarajan as Andipatti
- Mansoor Ali Khan as Arasampatti
- Manorama as Andipatti's mother
- Vilasini
- Senthil
- Alex as Walter Pichamuthu
- Kumarimuthu as Arasampatti's father
- Bayilvan Ranganathan
- R. Ramadas
- Ragunath
- Sujitha
- Siva Narayana Murthy
- Kullamani

== Production ==
Actress Jayarahini changed her stagename to Vilasini to feature in the film. Alongside her commitments for Andipatti Arasampatti, she simultaneously worked on two shelved films Sirppam and Ladies and Gentleman co-starring Livingston.

== Soundtrack ==
Andipatti Arasampatti

Soundtrack album by Rock Rownder
- Released: 2002
- Recorded: 2002
- Genre: Feature film soundtrack
- Length: 20:34
- Producer: Rock Rownder

the soundtrack was composed by Rock Rownder and the film score by S. P. Venkatesh. The soundtrack, released in 2002, features 6 tracks with lyrics written by Rock Rownder.

Track	Song	Singer(s)	Lyrics	Duration
1	"Andipatti Arasampatti"	Tippu	Rock Rownder	5:21
2	"Oduthupar Rattanam"	Krishnaraj	Rock Rownder	3:55
3	"Panganapalli Mengo" (male)	Rock Rownder	Rock Rownder	4:03
4	"Panganapalli Mengo" (female)	Anuradha Sriram	Rock Rownder	4:03
5	"Patchaipasu Pasanga"	Sri Ram	Rock Rownder	3:12
6	"Sundakanji Venuma"	Malgudi Subha	Rock Rownder	3:01

== Reception ==
The film was released on 4 November 2002. Chennai Online wrote "Juvenile in its scripting and its takings, it would do better for the makers to publicise it as a children's film, and target it at the little ones in the audience!".
