= Paravai =

Neighbourhood in Madurai district, Tamil Nadu, India

- Town
- Location in Tamil Nadu, India
- Coordinates: 9.9680501°N 78.0600852°E
- Country: India
- State: Tamil Nadu
- District: Madurai

Population (2001)
  - Total: 16,346

Languages
  - Official: Tamil
- Time zone: UTC+5:30 (IST)
- PIN: 625402

Paravai is a Panchayat town in Madurai district in the Indian state of Tamil Nadu.

== Demographics ==
As of 2001 India census, Paravai had a population of 16,346. Males constitute 51% of the population and females 49%. Paravai has an average literacy rate of 73%, higher than the national average of 59.5%: male literacy is 80%, and female literacy is 65%. In Paravai, 12% of the population is under 6 years of age. Paravai is a town panchayath in Madurai district.

== Politics ==
It is part of the Madurai (Lok Sabha constituency). S. Venkatesan also known as Su. Venkatesan from CPI(M) is the Member of Parliament, Lok Sabha, after his election in the 2019 Indian general election.

This area is in the Madurai West (state assembly constituency).
