= Benjamin (actor) =

Indian actor

- Born: K. Benjamin; 17 May 1965 (age 61)
- Occupation: Actor
- Years active: 2000-present

Benjamin is an Indian actor and comedian who has appeared in Tamil language films in supporting roles.

== Career ==
Benjamin made his acting debut through Cheran's Vetri Kodi Kattu (2000), where he played the foul-mouthed brother of Vadivelu's character.

Benjamin had a career breakthrough with Cheran's Autograph (2004) where he played the childhood friend of the lead character who assists him in his search for his former lovers. The success of the film led to his first lead comedy role in Thirupaachi (2005), as the friend of Vijay's character.

In 2020, Benjamin suffered a heart attack and made a public appeal for financial donations from his film industry colleagues.

== Filmography ==
Films

Year	Film	Role	Notes
2000	Vetri Kodi Kattu	Sudalaimuthu's brother-in-law	
2001	Sri Raja Rajeshwari		
2002	Ivan		
2002	Run		
2002	Bagavathi	Perumal	
2002	Kadhal Azhivathillai	College student	
2003	Anbe Sivam	Villager	
2003	Pallavan	Bus driver	
2003	Kadhal Sadugudu		
2003	Saamy	Kuppan	
2003	Thennavan	Dada Mani's sidekick	
2003	Sindhamal Sitharamal		
2004	Vayasu Pasanga		
2004	Autograph	Oolamookkan Subramani	
2004	Arul	Arul's friend	
2004	Thilak	Arokiya Bhavan hotel worker	
2004	Vasool Raja MBBS	Pickpocket	
2004	Jananam		
2005	Devathaiyai Kanden		
2005	Thirupaachi	Kannappan	
2005	Ayya	Monkey owner	
2005	Kicha Vayasu 16		
2006	Thirupathi		
2006	Kai Vandha Kalai		
2007	Veerasamy		
2007	Achacho	Ice cream seller	
2007	Thullal	Subramani	
2007	Ennai Paar Yogam Varum	Jaga's sidekick	
2007	Maamadurai		
2007	Sivi		
2007	Machakaaran		
2008	Indiralohathil Na Azhagappan		
2008	Valluvan Vasuki		
2008	Theekuchi		
2010	Tamizh Padam	Railway guard	
2010	Maanja Velu		
2011	Venghai	Selvam's friend	
2015	Iridiyam	Police constable	
2015	Maharani Kottai		
2018	Pakka	Drunkard	
2019	Vilambaram		
2019	Miga Miga Avasaram	Marimuthu	
2020	Naadodigal 2	Head constable	
2021	Namma Oorukku Ennadhan Achu		
2021	Vellai Yaanai		
2022	Saayam		
2022	4554		
2023	Meippada Sei		
2024	Kazhu Maram		
2024	Ethu Unakku Thevaya		
2025	Thotram		
2026	Gilli Mappillai		

Television

- Marmadesam - Vidathu Karuppu
- Ramany vs Ramany
- Aindham Vedham as Dharmakartha
