= Vayasu Pasanga =

2004 Tamil-language Indian film

- Directed by: Bharathi Kannan
- Screenplay by: Bharathi Kannan
- Story by: Peru Thulasi Palanivel
- Produced by: Maha Devaraj
- Starring: Anush; Jai Arvind; Master Manikandan; Vindhya
- Cinematography: Rajee V. Krishna
- Edited by: V. Jayasankar
- Music by: R. K. Sundar
- Production company: V. Productions
- Release date: 6 February 2004
- Running time: 135 minutes
- Country: India
- Language: Tamil

Vayasu Pasanga (transl. Coming-of-age boys) is a 2004 Indian Tamil-language coming-of-age thriller film directed by Bharathi Kannan. The film stars newcomer Anush, newcomer Jai Arvind, Master Manikandan and Vindhya, with J. Livingston, Kamalesh, Payal, Bharathi, and Asha playing supporting roles. The film, produced by Maha Devaraj, was released on 6 February 2004.

== Plot ==
Vicky, Pazhani and Lakshmipathi are three teenage friends. Their only aim is to skip classes and ogle girls. Their parents blindly believe that their sons are innocent, hardworking students.

The three friends are desperately looking for girlfriends, so they try hard to woo the girls in their class. One day during a girls' basketball practice, they ogle the girls playing and make sexual comments on the girls and their attire. The friends are accompanied by a much older guy who has failed classes for several years. He also makes obscene remarks about girls wearing sleeveless and tight tops. The school's principal confronts the boys. He warns the older guy to not crave the young students and asks him not to corrupt the boys' minds. But, he replies they are more mature and he is not the reason for their actions.

Some local thugs enter the premises and make sexual comments to the girls. One girl asks the thugs to leave. He mocks and fondles her. Another girl is groped by two thugs. The schoolboys observe, remarking that these guys are far more dangerous. One of them shouts at the girl, saying they are going to watch the free show. However, Lakshmi intervenes, only to be beaten up. The girls escape the ordeal. The female students wooed by the boys eventually accept them as friends/lovers and agree to just have fun being with them. The boys, however, use this try to get sexual favours from the girls. The girls then reject them.

An attractive and skimpily dressed Nandhini moves into their neighbourhood with her elderly husband Devaraj. The boys find Nandhini to be a plump MILF. The desperate boys, who fall under her charms, woo her and will do anything for her. The femme fatale Nandhini conspires to kill Devaraj, so she urges the innocent boys to kill him. The three boys attempt to kill Devaraj on several occasions but fail each time. One day, the boys find Devaraj dead on the street then tell Nandhini they killed him for her. Nandhini is overwhelmed by the news; she immediately calls the police, and the three boys are arrested. Afterwards, Devaraj's car driver Vasu confesses to Nandhini that he killed her husband. Before marrying Devaraj, Nandhini and Vasu were lovers and absolutely wanted to make it big in life. So, Nandhini married the wealthy old man Devaraj, while Vasu became his car driver, and they planned to kill Devaraj. However, Nandhini started to like Devaraj, who was caring and kind-hearted.

Feeling guilty, Nandhini shoots and kills Vasu then tells the police everything that has happened. Thus, Vicky, Pazhani and Lakshmi are released from jail. The three boys apologise to their parents and promise them that they will work hard at school.

== Cast ==
- Anush as Vicky
- Jai Arvind as Pazhani
- Master Manikandan as Lakshmipathi
- Vindhya as Nandhini
- J. Livingston as Devaraj
- Kamalesh as Vasu
- Payal as Anitha
- Bharathi as Pooja
- Asha
- Vinu Chakravarthy as Pazhani's father
- Kousalya Senthamarai as Pazhani's mother
- Balu Anand as Vicky's father
- K. R. Vatsala as Seethalakshmi, Vicky's mother
- Jubilee Natarajan as Lakshmipathi's father
- Anjali Devi as Lakshmipathi's mother
- Bharathi Kannan as Samy
- Crane Manohar
- Kottachi
- Benjamin
- Siva Narayana Murthy as College Principal
- Bava Lakshmanan as Bomb Pandi
- Srilatha as History Professor
- Boys Rajan as Police Officer
- Ganesh Acharya in a special appearance
- Sushmita in a special appearance
- Abhinayashree in a special appearance

== Production ==
Previously, the film was titled as Kadhal Pannum Vayasu and then the name was changed to Vayasu Pasanga. The film's story was written by public relation officer Peru Thulasi Palanivel.

== Soundtrack ==
The film score and the soundtrack were composed by R. K. Sundar, with lyrics written by Dr. Kiruthiya, Kalaikumar, Vaigai Selvan, Viveka and Punniya.

| Track | Song | Singer(s) | Duration |
|---|---|---|---|
| 1 | "Aana Aavanna" | Palakkad Sreeram, Sumathi Rao | 3:49 |
| 2 | "ABCD" (duet) | Malathy Lakshman, Prabhakar | 5:12 |
| 3 | "ABCD" (solo) | Baby Abirami | 1:52 |
| 4 | "Kamman Kattu Moolai" | Manikka Vinayagam | 4:56 |
| 5 | "Super Figure" | Tippu, Prabhakar, A. R. Reihana | 3:42 |
| 6 | "Vayasu Pasanga" | Prabhakar | 3:01 |
| 7 | "Tandanakka Pattu" | Krishnaraj, Vaigai Selvan, Saindhavi | 4:50 |

== Release and reception ==
The censor board felt the film too vulgar even for 'A' certificate standards. Finally, the film was handed back to the film unit after some serious warnings from the board. Malathi Rangarajan of The Hindu wrote, "The actual plot unfolds in the last 40 minutes, but by that time you are tired with the gibberish that has been going on for more than an hour". Sify stated, "The problem with the film is the stale story that we have seen in umpteen youth films" and criticised the excessive vulgarity. Chennai Online wrote "Bharati Kannan, after directing some devotionals, tries his hand at a different subject. But if this is the stuff he has to offer, he would do better to stick to his socio-religious genre!".
