= Maamadurai =

- Poster
- Directed by: K. K. Krishnan
- Written by: K. K. Krishnan
- Produced by: Kumar Ganesa Perumal
- Starring: Vaasan Karthik; Midhuna
- Cinematography: A. Karthikraja
- Edited by: P. Mohanraj
- Music by: Karthik Raja
- Production company: Thai Naadu Creations
- Release date: 13 July 2007
- Running time: 137 minutes
- Country: India
- Language: Tamil

Maamadurai (transl. Madurai) (Note: Maa refers to Mahalakshmi, who is housed at Meenakshi Amman Temple in Madurai.) is a 2007 Indian Tamil-language film directed by newcomer K. K. Krishnan. The film stars Vaasan Karthik and Midhuna, who is the younger sister of Rajashree. The music was composed by Karthik Raja. The film was released on 13 July 2007.

== Plot ==
The story starts in Madurai railway station, where Saravanan is a coolie, accompanied by his friends Aarumugam and Mayilsami. Saravanan is go-header and spends his life like that with his friends. One day Saravanan finds a mobile phone lying unclaimed in the railway station and he learns that it belongs to Nandini. Then Saravanan goes to Nandini's home to hand over the phone, but he discovers that Nandini is the sister of politician 'One Way' Kumar.

The intro between Saravanan and Nandini grew into friendship and later on it became love. Kumar is aware of his sister's love affair, so he tries to separate the couple by means of force, even then Saravanan and Nandini love was steady. At another end, Saravanan discovered his mother's presence through a church father, father helping Saravanan to find his mother.

== Cast ==
- Vaasan Karthik as Saravanan
- Midhuna as Nandini
- Vadivelu as Thangavelu
- Thambi Ramaiah as Osamma's husband
- Crane Manohar as Thangavelu's neighbour
- Benjamin as Thangavelu's friend
- Karunas as Aarumugam
- Mayilsamy
- Kottaikumar as 'One Way' Kumar
- Singamuthu
- Delhi Ganesh
- Seetha as Sivagami
- Erode Sounder as Sivagami's father
- Besant Ravi as Thangavelu's enemy
- Nizhalgal Ravi
- C. R. Saraswathi
- Balu Anand
- Madhan Bob
- Halwa Vasu
- Periya Karuppu Thevar
- Scissor Manohar

== Soundtrack ==
The music was composed by Karthik Raja. The track "Sorgam Madhuvile" from the 1978 film Sattam En Kaiyil was remixed in this film.

Song title	Lyricist	Singers
"Adakkivaasi"	Vijay Sagar	Ranjith, Bobby
"Askalale"	Kalaikumar	Malgudi Subha, Ranjith, Karunas, Chorus
"Koondukkal"	Vaali	Karthik, Sangeetha Rajeshwaran
"Madurai Maduraithaan"	Kottaikumar	Ilaiyaraaja, Rita, Karthik Raja, Naveen
"Sorgam Arugile"	Kannadasan	Karthik, Rita

== Reception ==
S. R. Ashok Kumar of The Hindu wrote that "If the director had bothered to join the loose ends, a reasonably good film would have emerged". Malini Mannath of Chennai Online wrote, "The film at the most is a promising effort from a first-time, director-hero team". Kollywood Today wrote, "the film had made the flight successfully without any interpret". Chitra of Kalki wrote it would have survived if it had been made into a full-length comedy. Love seems like main point but screenplay suddenly shifts to mother sentiment. It looks like as if something going to happen but ends up meh calling the climax uncompelling.

Cinesouth wrote, "A baby getting lost in a train, knowing the hero is not an orphan half way through the film, touching mother's feet as if picking something that has dropped down, when there is problem everyone in town remains silent while the hero materializes from nowhere and saves them... In how many films have we seen such stuff and become tired? It is then pointless to ascribe story, screenplay, dialogue and direction to oneself. 'Maamadurai' is a tired horse". Indiareel wrote, "Maamadurai would have been more interesting, if the director had attempted to avoid usual scenes".
