= Achacho =

- VCD cover
- Directed by: V. S. Balray
- Written by: V. S. Balray
- Produced by: I. Lima Rose
- Starring: Sri Hari; Varshini
- Cinematography: C. T. Arul Selvan
- Edited by: Suresh Urs
- Music by: M. K. S. Narula Khan
- Production company: Rosy Pictures
- Release date: 4 May 2007
- Running time: 115 minutes
- Country: India
- Language: Tamil

Achacho (transl. Whoops) is a 2007 Indian Tamil language romantic drama film written and directed by V. S. Balray. The film stars newcomers Sri Hari and Varshini, with Shanmugasundaram, Thalaivasal Vijay, Lavanya, Kumarimuthu, Nambirajan and Ponmaran playing supporting roles. It was released on 4 May 2007.

== Plot ==
The film begins with doctor Dhayalan being interviewed by the press. He explains that the baby girls should be saved from infanticide in India and explains how there will be a lesser number of women in the years to come.

In a remote village, the village chief Nattamai organises a competition to decide who will marry the single woman. There are now 24 unmarried young men waiting to get married, and seven girls who have not yet come of age in the village. The young men may not marry women from other villages due to their customs, so they have to wait until their village girl attains puberty, and the competition will decide it. At the village pachayat, Nattamai finds that the 14-year-old girl Vennila, who is from their village, is living in the city. He then orders that Vennila will marry one of the villagers in four years.

Four years later, Vennila comes to the village, and the 24 men try to woo her. Later, Kumaran, the son of a rich jeweller, comes to the village to give Vennila the jewels her father ordered, and he accidentally kisses her. After multiple encounters, they eventually fall in love. In the meantime, one of the young men elopes with a girl from another village. When Nattamai learns about it, he abducts the couple and burns them alive in public.

In the past, an astrologer told the ruthless village chief Muthulingam that a baby girl would destroy the village in the future, so Muthulingam killed all the baby girls. As years passed, there were no girls in the village. After Muthulingam's death, the new village chief stopped this inhuman activity.

Tired of this impractical custom, Nattamai and the villagers let Kumaran and Vennila live together. The young men are now allowed to marry girls from other villages.

== Cast ==
- Sri Hari as Kumaran
- Varshini as Vennila
- Shanmugasundaram as Nattamai
- Thalaivasal Vijay as Periyasamy
- Lavanya as Devi
- Kumarimuthu as Kumarimuthu
- Nambirajan as Muthulingam
- Ponmaran as Samikkanu, Vennila's father
- Muthukaalai as Tea master
- Benjamin as Ice cream seller
- Boys Rajan as Dhayalan
- Sahadevan
- Mahadevan
- Sendrayan as a young man
- Suja Varunee in a special appearance
- Seema in a special appearance

== Production ==
V. S. Balray made his directorial debut with Achacho under the banner of Rosy Pictures. Newcomer Sri Hari was chosen to play the hero while newcomer Varshini (credited as Priyasri) was selected to play the heroine. Twenty-four newcomers were cast to play young bachelors. M. K. S. Narula Khan composed the music, C. T. Arul Selvan took care of camera work and Suresh Urs was the film editor. The film was entirely shot in Gobichettipalayam.

== Soundtrack ==
The music composed by M. K. S. Narula Khan, with lyrics written by V. S. Balray. IndiaGlitz said, "With a healthy mix of soft, peppy and earthy songs, Noorulah has shown he is a good prospect for the future [..] Noorulah Khan has made a right beginning".

Song	Singer(s)	Duration
"Pasanga Pavam"	Mathangi Jagdish	5:31
"Aallipoove"	Harish Raghavendra, Prasanna	5:16
"Eaye Eaye"	Sunitha Sarathy	5:32
"Thottu Vidu"	Sunitha Sarathy	5:33
"Pengal"	Unni Menon, Mahathi	5:17
"Paathugoda"	Tippu, Mahathi	3:53

== Reception ==
Indiareel wrote, "Though Achacho has got a good theme, logical potholes in the film makes it hard to survive in the second half". Cinesouth said, "Such a happening in the present age is unbelievable, but hats off to the director for having managed 24 new faces and moving the story along into a comic angle". Malini Mannath wrote for Chennai Online, "It's a plot that's different from the routine ones. Debutant Balraj can be commended for his novelty of concept and his effort to think differently. But what the film misses out on strongly is finesse".
