= Singamuthu =

Indian actor (born 1958)

- Born: 8 December 1958 (age 67); Thirumangalam, Madurai, India
- Citizenship: Indian
- Occupation: Actor
- Years active: 1987-present
- Children: Karthick Singa

Singamuthu (born 8 December 1958) is an Indian actor who has appeared in Tamil language films as a comedian.

== Career ==
Singamuthu has primarily appeared in comedy roles in films as a supporting actor debuting in Neram Nalla Irukku (1987). He started developing his career in the acting sector by doing small comedy roles in cinemas. He often shared screen space with popular comedian Vadivelu, and the duo has given many hilarious comedy scenes to Tamil movies.

== Controversy ==
In 2010, Vadivelu held a press conference, accusing Singamuthu for forgery and financial cheating. Vadivelu, who was previously friends with Singamuthu, purchased land from him, but later came to learn that the documents were void. This resulted in the former taking legal action on the latter. Later in May 2010, Singamuthu was arrested after assaulting Vadivelu's assistant Shankar, but was later released after three days in jail. It was eventually proved that the pair were actually cheated by the salesman, who had sold the land to Singamuthu illegally.

== Filmography ==
- Neram Nalla Irukku (1987)
- Maruthu Pandi (1990)
- Pudhiya Raagam (1991)
- Thaali Kattiya Raasa (1992)
- Magudam (1992)
- Pandithurai (1992)
- Deiva Vaakku (1992)
- Samundi (1992)
- Pon Vilangu (1993)
- Gokulam (1993)
- Naan Pesa Ninaipathellam (1993)
- Maravan (1993)
- Parvathi Ennai Paradi (1993)
- Uzhiyan (1994)
- Pudhiya Mannargal (1994)
- Ravanan (1994)
- Chinna Mani (1995)
- Rajavin Parvaiyile (1995)
- Aruva Velu (1996)
- Vaazhga Jananayagam (1996)
- Poove Unakkaga (1996) (uncredited)
- Suryavamsam (1997)
- Ullaasam (1997)
- Aahaa Enna Porutham (1997)
- Ini Ellam Sugame (1998)
- Unnidathil Ennai Koduthen (1998)
- Guru Paarvai (1998)
- Simmarasi (1998)
- Kumbakonam Gopalu (1998)
- Dharma (1998)
- Nee Varuvai Ena (1999)
- Ullathai Killathe (1999)
- Azhagarsamy (1999)
- Unnai Thedi (1999)
- Pudhu Kudithanam (1999)
- Vaanathaippola (2000)
- Vaanavil (2000)
- Unakkaga Mattum (2000)
- Vinnukum Mannukum (2001)
- Sri Raja Rajeshwari (2001)
- Ullam Kollai Poguthae (2001)
- Dhaya (2002)
- Kamarasu (2002)
- Raajjiyam (2002)
- Sri Bannari Amman (2002)
- Unnai Ninaithu (2002)
- Shree (2002)
- Karmegham (2002)
- Bagavathi (2002)
- I Love You Da (2002)
- Aasai Aasaiyai (2003)
- Anbu (2003)
- Eera Nilam (2003)
- Thathi Thavadhu Manasu (2003)
- Saamy (2003)
- Winner (2003)
- Kadhal Kirukkan (2003)
- Kovil (2004)
- Kudaikkul Mazhai (2004)
- Giri (2004)
- Oru Murai Sollividu (2004)
- Neranja Manasu (2004)
- Chatrapathy (2004)
- Jananam (2004)
- Aayudham (2005)
- Thaka Thimi Tha (2005)
- Sevvel (2005)
- 6'2 (2005)
- Kana Kandaen (2005)
- Englishkaran (2005)
- Kaatrullavarai (2005)
- Daas (2005)
- A. B. C. D. (2005)
- Chanakya (2005)
- Mazhai (2005)
- Kundakka Mandakka (2005)
- Bambara Kannaley (2005)
- Aanai (2005)
- Aaru (2005)
- Vetrivel Sakthivel (2005)
- Veeranna (2005)
- Unarchigal (2006)
- Pasa Kiligal (2006)
- Kovai Brothers (2006)
- Imsai Arasan 23rd Pulikecei (2006)
- Vathiyar (2006)
- Thimiru (2006)
- Kumaran (2006)
- Nenjil Jil Jil (2006)
- Vetrivel Sakthivel (2006)
- Kalakkura Chandru (2007)
- Manikanda (2007)
- Maa Madurai (2007)
- Marudhamalai (2007)
- Cheena Thaana 001 (2007)
- Vel (2007)
- Kasu Irukkanum (2007)
- Vambu Sandai (2008)
- Kannum Kannum (2008)
- Tharagu (2008)
- Vedha (2008)
- Pandi (2008)
- Kathavarayan (2008)
- Kuselan (2008)
- Seval (2008)
- Karthik Anitha (2009)
- Rajadhi Raja (2009)
- Ragavan (2009)
- Vaigai (2009)
- Engal Aasan (2009)
- Malai Malai (2009)
- Kannukulle (2009)
- Kanden Kadhalai (2009)
- Sirithal Rasipen (2009)
- Kadhai (2010)
- Guru Sishyan (2010)
- Maanja Velu (2010)
- Neethana Avan (2010)
- 365 Kadhal Kadithangal (2010)
- Ambasamudram Ambani (2010)
- Neeyum Naanum (2010)
- Mandhira Punnagai (2010)
- Chikku Bukku (2010)
- Aadu Puli (2011)
- Ayyan (2011)
- Kasethan Kadavulada (2011)
- Vandhaan Vendraan (2011)
- Vellore Maavattam (2011)
- Velayudham (2011)
- Paavi (2011)
- Dhoni (2012)
- Mayil Paarai (2013)
- Thirumathi Thamizh (2013)
- Yaaruda Mahesh (2013)
- Sonna Puriyathu (2013)
- Raja Rani (2013)
- Pattathu Yaanai (2013)
- Adhu Vera Idhu Vera (2014)
- Oru Oorla Rendu Raja (2014)
- Pagadai Pagadai (2014)
- Vellaikaara Durai (2014)
- Katham Katham (2015)
- Guru Sukran (2015)
- En Vazhi Thani Vazhi (2015)
- Kaaval (2015)
- Adhibar (2015)
- Aaranyam (2015)
- Inimey Ippadithan (2015)
- Naalu Per Naalu Vidhama Pesuvaanga (2016)
- Adra Machan Visilu (2016)
- Dhilluku Dhuddu (2016)
- Ennama Katha Vudranunga (2016)
- Meendum Oru Kadhal Kadhai (2016)
- Kodi (2016)
- Mapla Singam (2016)
- Muthuramalingam (2017) as Swamiji
- Vaigai Express (2017)
- Anbanavan Asaradhavan Adangadhavan (2017)
- Azhagin Bommi (2017)
- Aangila Padam (2017)
- Kalavaadiya Pozhuthugal (2017)
- Pakka (2018)
- Mannar Vagaiyara (2018)
- Kalakalappu 2 (2018)
- Kannakkol (2018)
- Saamy 2 (2018)
- Genius (2018)
- Silukkuvarupatti Singam (2018)
- Vantha Rajavathaan Varuven (2019)
- Naan Avalai Sandhitha Pothu (2019)
- Yevanum Buthanillai (2020)
- Sollunganne Sollunga (2020)
- Iruvar Ullam (2021)
- Idiot (2022)
- Dha Dha (2022)
- Kodai (2023)
- Beauty (2023)
- Otha Votu Muthaiya (2025)

=== Television ===
Year	Title	Channel
2018	Maya	Sun TV
2020	Poove Poochudava	Zee Tamil
2021	Sillunu Oru Kaadhal	Colors Tamil
2021	Jothi	Sun TV

== Award ==
- 2014: Tamil Nadu State Film Award for Best Comedian - Many films
