= Ayyan (film) =

- Directed by: Kendiran Muniyaswamy
- Written by: Kendiran Muniyaswamy
- Produced by: S. Shekar Rajan
- Starring: Vaasan Karthikk; Divya Padmini
- Cinematography: Kasiyaapillai
- Edited by: P. Sai Suresh
- Music by: Ilayaraja
- Production company: Varsha Pictures
- Release date: 11 March 2011
- Country: India
- Language: Tamil

Ayyan (transl. Village guardian) is a 2011 Indian Tamil-language drama film. It was written and directed by Kendiran Muniyaswamy, and produced by S. Shekar Rajan under the banner of S. S. Pictures. It stars Vaasan Karthik and the debutant Divya Padmini. Ilayaraja composed the film's music.

== Cast ==
- Vaasan Karthik as Muniyasami
- Divya Padmini as Selvi
- Ganja Karuppu
- Singamuthu
- Shanmugarajan as Arumugha Thevar
- Mahadevan as Pandian
- Periyar Dasan
- Crane Manohar
- Muthukaalai
- Halwa Vasu
- Bonda Mani
- Suryakanth

== Production ==
The film is based on a true incident that happened in Mudukulathur.

== Soundtrack ==
The music of the film is composed by Ilayaraja.

Song title	Singers	Lyricist
"Hey Sivagami"	Rahul Nambiar, Rita	Snehan
"Manasoram"	Sadhana Sargam, Sriram Parthasarathy	Kabilan
"Enakenna Oruthi"	Rahul Nambiar	Na. Muthukumar
"Unmaiyaai Naan"	Maya, Chorus	Sirpi Balasubramaniam
"Kaatrinai Pol Ingu"	Tippu	Mu. Metha
"Viduthalaikuyil Naan"	Ilayaraja, Megha	Vaali
