= Abhinayashree =

Indian actress

- Born: Abhinayashree; 6 August 1988 (age 38); Chennai, Tamil Nadu, India
- Occupations: Actress, choreographer
- Years active: 2001–present
- Parents: Sathish Kumar; Anuradha

Abhinayashree (born 6 August 1988) is an Indian actress and dancer known for her works in the Tamil film and television industries. She has also acted in Telugu, Malayalam, and Kannada language films.

She appeared as a contestant on Bigg Boss (Telugu season 6).

== Career ==
Her first major role came in Siddique's 2001 Tamil comedy Friends, which featured her as Vijay's one-sided lover. Her song "Aa Ante Amalapuram" from the film Arya (2004) is a hit.

She played her first lead role in the 2005 Telugu comedy Hungama (2005) appearing alongside Ali and Venu Madhav. The actress won the Nandi Award for Best Female Comedian for her role in Paisalo Paramatma (2007).

After appearing in a full-fledged supporting role in the 2007 Telugu film Adivaram Adavallaku Selavu, Abhinayashree opted against appearing in any more item numbers, but soon went back on her decision explaining that the likes of Mumaith Khan were successfully able to balance both.

On the TV front, she has hosted the dance show Junior Super Dancer (2015–2016). She took part in the reality show Star Wars (2017–2018). Abhinayashree participated in Bigg Boss (Telugu season 6) (2022) hosted by Nagarjuna and was evicted on the 14th day.

== Filmography ==
Year	Title	Role	Language	Notes
2001	Friends	Abhirami	Tamil	
2001	Snehamante Idera	Swathi	Telugu	
2002	Saptham	Jennifer	Tamil	
2002	123	Jyothi	Tamil	Partially reshot in Telugu / Kannada
2002	Maaran	Dancer	Tamil	Special appearance
2002	Kariya	Maya	Kannada	
2002	Thandavam	Dancer	Malayalam	Special appearance
2002	Pranayamanithooval	Dancer	Malayalam	
2003	Ramachandra	Sandhya	Tamil	
2003	Anbu	Rasiga	Tamil	
2003	Banda Paramasivam	Anju	Tamil	
2003	Kovilpatti Veeralakshmi	Dancer	Tamil	Special appearance
2003	Iyarkai	Dancer	Tamil	Special appearance
2003	Thathi Thavadhu Manasu	Dancer	Tamil	Special appearance
2004	Image	Sri	Tamil	
2004	Arya	Dancer	Telugu	Special appearance
2004	Vayasu Pasanga	Dancer	Tamil	Special appearance
2004	Swetha Naagu	Vasuki	Telugu; Kannada	
2004	Super Da	Dancer	Tamil	Special appearance
2004	Shanti Sandesham		Telugu	
2004	Singara Chennai	Dancer	Tamil	Special appearance
2004	Aaptudu	Dancer	Telugu	Special appearance
2004	En Purushan Ethir Veetu Ponnu	Meenakshi	Tamil	
2004	Mr & Mrs Sailaja Krishnamurthy	Nagamani	Telugu	Special appearance
2004	Jai		Telugu	
2005	Ayodhya	Dancer	Tamil	Special appearance
2005	Jathi	Priya	Tamil	
2005	Jootata	Sanjay's neighbor	Kannada	
2005	Hungama	Divya	Telugu	
2005	Yuvakulu		Telugu	
2005	Premikulu	Dancer	Telugu	Special appearance
2005	Evadi Gola Vaadidhi	Dancer	Telugu	Special appearance
2005	Padhavi Paduthum Paadu	Dancer	Tamil	Special appearance
2005	Seenugadu Chiranjeevi Fan	Dancer	Telugu	Special appearance
2005	Manthiran	Dancer	Tamil	Special appearance
2006	Unarchigal	Kavitha	Tamil	
2006	Naidu LLB		Telugu	
2006	Bhagyalakshmi Bumper Draw	Parvathi Gotham	Telugu	
2006	Sri Krishna 2006	Satya	Telugu	
2006	Neeku Naaku	Lakshmi	Telugu	
2007	Paisalo Paramatma		Telugu	Nandi Award for Best Female Comedian
2007	Adivaram Adavallaku Selavu		Telugu	
2007	Athili Sattibabu LKG	Mangatayaru	Telugu	
2007	Aata		Telugu	
2007	Challenge	Abhinaya	Telugu	
2007	Chandamama	Sakkubai	Telugu	
2007	Maharajashri		Telugu	
2007	Nee Naan Nila	Dancer	Tamil	Special appearance
2007	Nanma		Malayalam	
2007	Pagala Premi	Dancer	Odia	Special appearance
2007	Pagal Premi	Dancer	Bengali	Special appearance
2007	Pellaindi Kaani	Dancer	Telugu	Special appearance
2007	Agra	Dancer	Tamil	Special appearance
2007	Chandrahas	Dancer	Telugu	Special appearance
2008	Michael Madana Kamaraju	Julie	Telugu	
2008	Mallepuvvu	Rathalu	Telugu	
2008	Pathu Pathu	Dancer	Tamil	Special appearance
2008	Veedu Mamoolodu Kadu	Shalu	Telugu	
2009	Oru Kadhalan Oru Kadhali	Lakshmi	Tamil	
2009	4 Couples	Saroja	Telugu	
2009	Nirnayam		Telugu	
2009	Khiladi No. 1	Bhairavi	Bhojpuri	
2009	Ek Niranjan	Guru's wife	Telugu	
2009	Enga Raasi Nalla Raasi	Dancer	Tamil	Special appearance
2010	Va	Singari Sundaram	Tamil	
2010	Simha	Dancer	Telugu	Special appearance
2010	Pollachi Mappillai	Dancer	Tamil	Special appearance
2010	Vaare Vah	Dancer	Kannada	Special appearance
2011	Glamour		Telugu	
2011	Raman Nalla Pillai	Gomathi	Tamil	
2011	Kireetam	Shravani	Telugu	
2012	Uu Kodathara? Ulikki Padathara?	Golla Savitri	Telugu	
2014	Thalakonam		Tamil	Special appearance
2015	Palakkattu Madhavan	Dancer	Tamil	Special appearance
2016	Sutta Pazham Sudatha Pazham	Dancer	Tamil	Special appearance
2016	Ilamai Oonjal	Dancer	Tamil	Special appearance
2017	Soundharya Nilaya	Mayoori	Kannada	
2021	Boom Boom Kaalai	Kevin's sister	Tamil	
2023	Striker		Tamil	

== Television ==
Year	Series/Shows	Role	Channel	Language	Notes
2015–2016	Junior Super Dancer	Host	Polimer TV	Tamil	
2017–2018	Star Wars	Contestant	Sun TV	Tamil	
2017–2018	Dance Jodi Dance (season 2)	Contestant	Zee Tamil	Tamil	
2018–2019	Nenjam Marapathillai	Herself	Star Vijay	Tamil	Special Appearance
2022	Bigg Boss (Telugu season 6)	Contestant	Star Maa	Telugu	Evicted
2025	Devika & Danny	Durga's wife	JioHotstar	Telugu	
