= Trisha Krishnan filmography =

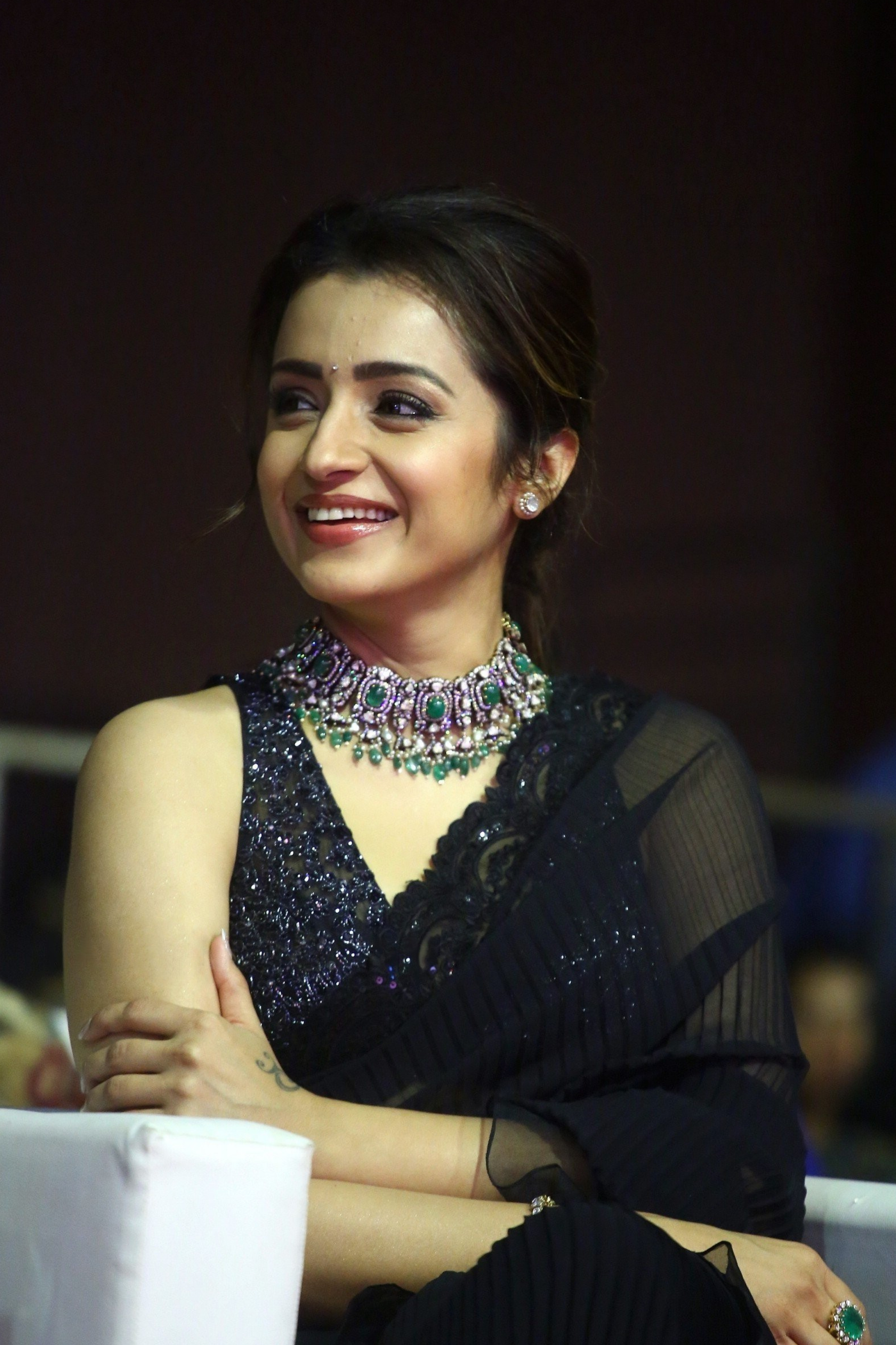
Trisha Krishnan in 2022

Trisha Krishnan (Note: In this Indian name, the name Krishnan is a patronymic, and the person should be referred to by the given name, Trisha.) is an Indian actress known for her work primarily in Tamil and Telugu cinema. She is one of the South Indian actress to have sustained a successful career as a leading actress for over two decades in Tamil cinema. She was first seen in 1999 in a minor supporting role in Jodi and later appeared in 2000 in the music video of Falguni Pathak's song 'Meri Chunar Udd Udd Jaye'.

The first project she accepted as a lead actress was Priyadarshan's Lesa Lesa but a delay in the film's release meant that her first appearance in a lead role was in Ameer's directorial debut Mounam Pesiyadhe in 2002, which was a commercial success. The following year, Trisha portrayed a woman battling a terminal illness in Manasellam (2003). Her next release was Hari's action film, Saamy (2003) in which she played a soft-spoken Brahmin girl and attracted praise for her performance, and the film became a major commercial and critical success, resulting in Trisha receiving new offers, including those from several high-budget productions. Lesa Lesa, which was to have been her debut as a lead actress, was released next, earned her the ITFA Best New Actress Award. She starred in Alai (2003) and the Tamil-Telugu bilingual film Enakku 20 Unakku 18 (2003) (Nee Manasu Naaku Telusu) were commercially unsuccessful. Trisha's next Telugu release, Varsham (2004), was a major commercial and critical success, earning her the first Filmfare Award for Best Actress-Telugu and more Telugu film offers. Trisha starred in Ghilli (2004) as a damsel in distress, and the film became a major critical and commercial success. She starred in Mani Ratnam's political drama Aayutha Ezhuthu (2004). She starred in Thirupaachi (2005), which became a major commercial success. Trisha played a village girl in the romantic comedy Nuvvostanante Nenoddantana (2005), a commercial and critical success that earned her a second Filmfare Award for Best Actress and a Nandi Award for Best Actress. Athadu (2005), Aaru (2005), Stalin (2006), were major commercial successes. She reprised the role in the Tamil remake Unakkum Enakkum (2006) which was also successful. She played the titular role in Pournami (2006). Aadavari Matalaku Arthale Verule (2007) was a critical and commercial success, earning Trisha her third Filmfare Award for Best Actress and the same year Kireedam (2007) was a commercial success. Krishna (2008) and King (2008) became blockbusters, while Bheema (2008) was commercially unsuccessful, and Kuruvi (2008) and Bujjigadu (2008) emerged as hits. In Abhiyum Naanum (2008), Trisha's performance was widely praised, and earned her Tamil Nadu State Film Award and a Filmfare nomination for Best Actress. Her 2009 films Sarvam and Sankham did not do well and became average grossers. The following year, Vinnaithaandi Varuvaayaa (2010) was a major success and a career breakthrough for Trisha, earning her a Filmfare nomination for Best Actress. She made her debut in Hindi cinema with the film Khatta Meetha (2010) Upon release, the film received mixed reviews from critics and box office India declared it an average performer at the box office. However, it earned her nomination for a Filmfare Award for Best Female Debut. Her sole Telugu release that year was Namo Venkatesa. Both her 2011 releases –Teen Maar and Mankatha were successful. She had two releases in 2012, Bodyguard and Dammu were successful. Her two Tamil films in 2013 the mystery thriller Samar, and Endrendrum Punnagai (2013), which earned her a Filmfare nomination for Best Actress. Her sole release in 2014 was Power, which marked her debut in Kannada cinema was a commercial success.

Trisha's 2015 films included the crime thriller Yennai Arindhaal, the comedy Sakalakala Vallavan, the Tamil-Telugu bilingual thriller Thoongaa Vanam / Cheekati Rajyam, and the sports drama Bhooloham. In 2016, she appeared in the comedy horror films Aranmanai 2 and the Tamil-Telugu bilingual Nayaki (spelt Nayagi in Tamil), followed by the political thriller Kodi (2016), which earned her a Filmfare Critics Award for Best Actress– Tamil. Trisha won a Filmfare Award for Best Actress (Tamil) for '96 (2018), and in the same year made her debut in Malayalam cinema in Hey Jude (2018). She played a dual role in the horror film Mohini (2018). In 2019, she co-starred with Rajinikanth in Petta. In 2020, she reprised her role as Jessi from Vinnaithaandi Varuvaayaa (2010) in the short film Karthik Dial Seytha Yenn (2020), presenting a fresh narrative. Paramapadham Vilayattu (2021) was released directly on Disney+ Hotstar due to the COVID-19 pandemic. She portrayed Princess Kundavai, in Ponniyin Selvan: I (2022), earning critical acclaim and a Filmfare Award nomination for Best Actress. Her next in the action thriller Raangi (2022). In 2023, she reprised her role in Ponniyin Selvan: II receiving another Filmfare nomination for Best Actress. That year, she also starred in the film The Road (2023), and the highly anticipated film Leo (2023), which become one of the highest-grossing South Indian films of 2023. In 2024, Ghilli (2004) was re-released for its 20th anniversary and became one of the highest-grossing re-released Indian films. In August, she starred as a police officer in the web series Brinda (2024). She made a special appearance in the film The Greatest of All Time (2024), captivating audiences with her performance in the dance number "Matta". In 2025, she starred in her second Malayalam film Identity, and Tamil films Vidaamuyarchi, Good Bad Ugly, and Thug Life. In 2026, she starred opposite Suriya in the Tamil film Karuppu which emerged as a major box office success and marked a continuation of her successful run in Tamil cinema. The same year, she also made a brief appearance opposite Paal Dabba in the album song PsiloVibin.

== Films ==
Key
†	Denotes films that have not yet been released

List of films done by Trisha Krishnan
Year	Title	Role(s)	Language(s)	Notes	Ref.
1999	Jodi	Anuradha	Tamil	Debut	
2002	Mounam Pesiyadhe	Santhiya	Tamil	Debut in a lead role	
2003	Manasellam	Malar	Tamil		
2003	Saamy	Bhuvana	Tamil		
2003	Lesa Lesa	Balamani	Tamil		
2003	Alai	Meera	Tamil		
2003	Enakku 20 Unakku 18	Preethi	Tamil	Bilingual film (Debut in Telugu)	
2003	Nee Manasu Naaku Telusu	Preethi	Telugu	Bilingual film (Debut in Telugu)	
2004	Varsham	Sailaja	Telugu		
2004	Ghilli	Dhanalakshmi	Tamil		
2004	Aayutha Ezhuthu	Meera	Tamil		
2005	Thirupaachi	Subha	Tamil		
2005	Nuvvostanante Nenoddantana	Siri	Telugu		
2005	Ji	Bhuvana	Tamil		
2005	Athadu	Poori	Telugu		
2005	Allari Bullodu	Trisha	Telugu		
2005	Aaru	Mahalakshmi	Tamil		
2006	Aathi	Anjali	Tamil		
2006	Pournami	Pournami	Telugu		
2006	Bangaram	Dhanalakshmi	Telugu	Special appearance	
2006	Unakkum Enakkum	Kavitha	Tamil		
2006	Stalin	Chithra	Telugu		
2006	Sainikudu	Varalakshmi	Telugu		
2007	Aadavari Matalaku Arthale Verule	Keerthi (Kusumamba)	Telugu		
2007	Kireedam	Divya	Tamil		
2008	Krishna	Santhiya	Telugu		
2008	Bheemaa	Shalini (Shalu)	Tamil		
2008	Velli Thirai	Herself	Tamil	Cameo	
2008	Kuruvi	Radhadevi (Devi)	Tamil		
2008	Bujjigadu	Meghana (Chitti)	Telugu		
2008	Abhiyum Naanum	Abhi	Tamil		
2008	King	Sravani	Telugu		
2009	Sarvam	Dr. Santhiya	Tamil		
2009	Sankham	Mahalakshmi Naidu	Telugu		
2010	Namo Venkatesa	Pooja	Telugu		
2010	Vinnaithaandi Varuvaayaa	Jessie Thekekuthu	Tamil		
2010	Ye Maaya Chesave	Herself	Telugu	Cameo	
2010	Khatta Meetha	Gehna Ganphule	Hindi	Debut in Hindi	
2010	Manmadan Ambu	Ambujakashi (Nisha)	Tamil		
2011	Teen Maar	Meera Shastri	Telugu		
2011	Mankatha	Sanjana Aarumugam	Tamil		
2012	Bodyguard	Keerthi	Telugu		
2012	Dammu	Sathya	Telugu		
2013	Samar	Maya	Tamil		
2013	Endrendrum Punnagai	Priya	Tamil		
2014	Power	Prashanti	Kannada	Debut in Kannada	
2015	Yennai Arindhaal	Hemanika	Tamil		
2015	Lion	Guggilla Mahalakshmi / Manjula	Telugu		
2015	Sakalakala Vallavan	Divya	Tamil		
2015	Thoongaa Vanam	Mallika	Tamil	Bilingual film	
2015	Cheekati Rajyam	Mallika	Telugu	Bilingual film	
2015	Bhooloham	Sindhu	Tamil		
2016	Aranmanai 2	Anitha	Tamil		
2016	Nayaki	Gayathri	Telugu	Also singer for the song "Bayam"	
2016	Nayagi	Gayathri	Tamil	Also singer for the song "Bayam"	
2016	Kodi	Rudhra	Tamil		
2018	Hey Jude	Crystal Ann Chakraparambu	Malayalam	Debut in Malayalam	
2018	Mohini	Mohini and Vaishnavi (Note: Trisha played two characters.)	Tamil		
2018	'96	Janakidevi "Janu"	Tamil		
2019	Petta	Saro	Tamil		
2021	Paramapadham Vilayattu	Dr. Gayathri	Tamil	Direct OTT release (Released on Disney+ Hotstar)	
2022	Ponniyin Selvan: I	Kundavai Ilaiya Piratti	Tamil		
2022	Raangi	Thaiyal Nayagi	Tamil		
2023	Ponniyin Selvan: II	Kundavai Ilaiya Piratti	Tamil		
2023	The Road	Meera	Tamil		
2023	Leo	Sathya Parthiban	Tamil		
2024	The Greatest of All Time	Yellow Sari	Tamil	Special appearance in the song "Matta"	
2025	Identity	Alisha Abdul Salam	Malayalam		
2025	Vidaamuyarchi	Kayal Arjun	Tamil		
2025	Good Bad Ugly	Ramya	Tamil		
2025	Thug Life	Indhrani	Tamil		
2026	Karuppu	Preethi	Tamil		
TBA	Vishwambhara †	TBA	Telugu	Delayed	
TBA	Ram †	TBA	Malayalam	Delayed	

== Short film ==
List of films done by Trisha Krishnan
Year	Title	Role(s)	Language(s)	Ref.
2020	Karthik Dial Seytha Yenn	Jessie Thekekuthu	Tamil	

== Web series ==
List of television show done by Trisha Krishnan
Year	Title	Role	Language	Platform	Notes	Ref.
2024	Brinda	SI K.Brinda	Telugu	SonyLIV	OTT Debut	

== Music videos ==
List of music videos done by Trisha Krishnan
Year	Title	Role(s)	Performer(s)	Album	Language(s)	Ref.
2000	"Meri Chunar Udd Udd Jaye"	Featured as a mystical figure emerging from a painting	Falguni Pathak	Meri Chunar Udd Udd Jaye	Hindi	
2026	"PsiloVibin"	Special Appearance	Paal Dabba	PsiloVibin	Tamil	

== See also ==
- List of awards and nominations received by Trisha Krishnan

== Bibliography ==
- "Trisha's journey: From Miss Madras to Khatta Meetha". Sify. 2010. Archived from the original on 15 March 2017. Alt URL
