= List of awards and nominations received by Trisha Krishnan =

Trisha Krishnan awards and nominations
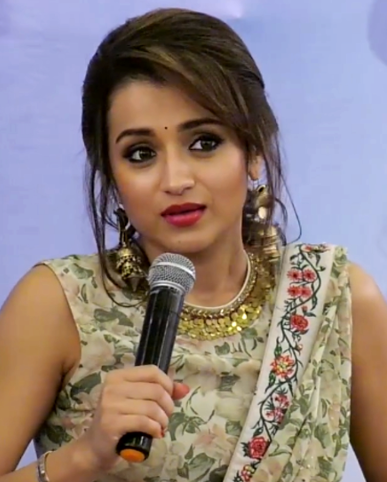
- Trisha at UNICEF's World Children's Day press meet
Awards and nominations
Award	Wins	Nominations
Ananda Vikatan Cinema Awards	1	1
Asianet Film Awards	2	0
Asiavision Awards	1	0
CineMAA Awards	2	0
Edison Awards	2	1
Filmfare Awards South	5	6
International Tamil Film Awards	1	0
Nandi Awards	1	0
NDTV Indian of the Year	1	0
Norway Tamil Film Festival Awards	1	0
Santosham Film Awards	2	0
South Indian International Movie Awards	9	2
Stardust Awards	0	1
Tamil Nadu State Film Awards	1	0
Zee Cine Awards	0	1
Kalaimamani Award	1	0
Filmfare Award for Best Female Debut	0	1
IIFA Utsavam Awards	0	1
Other Awards	36	0

Totals (Note: Certain award groups do not simply award one winner. They acknowledge several different recipients, have runners-up, and have third place. Since this is a specific recognition and is different from losing an award, runner-up mentions are considered wins in this award tally. For simplification and to avoid errors, each award in this list has been presumed to have had a prior nomination.)
- Wins: 45
- Nominations: 80

Trisha Krishnan is an Indian actress and model, primarily known for her work in the South Indian film industry. She won the Miss Chennai beauty pageant in 1999. She is the recipient of five Filmfare Awards South, a Tamil Nadu State Film Award, and a Nandi Award. Trisha received the Kalaimamani award, for her contribution to Tamil cinema, in 2006.

== Awards and nominations ==
List of awards and nominations received by Trisha Krishnan
Award	Year	Category	Nominated work	Result	Ref.
Ananda Vikatan Cinema Awards	2018	Best Actress	'96	Won	
Ananda Vikatan Cinema Awards	2023	Best Actress	Ponniyin Selvan: I	Nominated	
Asianet Film Awards	2015	Most Popular Tamil Actress	Thoongaa Vanam	Won	
Asianet Film Awards	2018	Most Popular Tamil Actress	'96	Won	
Asiavision Awards	2019	Best Actress of the Decade	'96; Hey Jude	Won	
CineMAA Awards	2004	Best Actor - Female	Varsham	Won	
CineMAA Awards	2007	Best Actor - Female	Aadavari Matalaku Ardhalu Verule	Won	
Edison Awards	2010	Best Actress	Vinnaithaandi Varuvaayaa	Won	
Edison Awards	2016	Best Actress	Kodi	Won	
Edison Awards	2018	Best Actress	'96	Nominated	
Filmfare Award for Best Female Debut	2011	Best Female Debut	Khatta Meetha	Nominated	
Filmfare Awards South	2004	Best Actress – Telugu	Varsham	Won	
Filmfare Awards South	2005	Best Actress – Telugu	Nuvvostanante Nenoddantana	Won	
Filmfare Awards South	2005	Best Actress – Telugu	Athadu	Nominated	
Filmfare Awards South	2007	Best Actress – Telugu	Aadavari Matalaku Ardhalu Verule	Won	
Filmfare Awards South	2008	Best Actress – Telugu	Krishna	Nominated	
Filmfare Awards South	2008	Best Actress – Tamil	Abhiyum Naanum	Nominated	
Filmfare Awards South	2010	Best Actress – Tamil	Vinnaithaandi Varuvaayaa	Nominated	
Filmfare Awards South	2013	Best Actress – Tamil	Endrendrum Punnagai	Nominated	
Filmfare Awards South	2016	Best Actress – Tamil	Kodi	Nominated	
Filmfare Awards South	2016	Critics Best Actress – Tamil	Kodi	Won	
Filmfare Awards South	2018	Best Actress – Tamil	'96	Won	
Filmfare Awards South	2023	Best Actress – Tamil	Ponniyin Selvan :I	Nominated	
Filmfare Awards South	2024	Best Actress – Tamil	Ponniyin Selvan: II	Nominated	
International Indian Film Academy Awards-Tamil	2015	Performance In A Leading Role – Female	Yennai Arindhaal	Nominated	
International Tamil Film Awards	2003	Best New Actress Award	Lesa Lesa	Won	
Kalaimamani Award	2006	Honorary		Won	
Nandi Awards	2005	Best Actress	Nuvvostanante Nenoddantana	Won	
NDTV Indian of the Year	2010	Trisha Krishnan	Southern Star of the Year	Won	
NDTV Lifestyle Awards	2011	Trisha Krishnan	Most Stylish Female Actor	Won	
Norway Tamil Film Festival Awards	2018	Best Actor Female	'96	Won	
Santosham Film Awards	2004	Best Actress	Varsham	Won	
Santosham Film Awards	2011	Trisha Krishnan	Best Actress of the Decade	Won	
South Indian International Movie Awards	2012	Trisha Krishnan	Youth Icon of South Indian Cinema	Won	
South Indian International Movie Awards	2013	Trisha Krishnan	10 Years of Excellence in Cinema	Won	
South Indian International Movie Awards	2014	Best Actress – Tamil	Endrendrum Punnagai	Won	
South Indian International Movie Awards	2014	Trisha Krishnan	Most Popular Celebrity in South India on Social Media Twitter	Won	
South Indian International Movie Awards	2017	Best Actor in a Negative Role	Kodi	Won	
South Indian International Movie Awards	2019	Best Actress – Malayalam	Hey Jude	Nominated	
South Indian International Movie Awards	2019	Critics' Choice Best Actress – Malayalam	Hey Jude	Won	
South Indian International Movie Awards	2019	Best Actress – Tamil	'96	Won	
South Indian International Movie Awards	2023	Best Actress – Tamil	Ponniyin Selvan: I	Won	
South Indian International Movie Awards	2024	Best Actress – Tamil	Leo	Nominated	
South Indian International Movie Awards	2025	Trisha Krishnan	25 Years in South Indian cinema	Won	
Stardust Awards	2010	Superstar of Tomorrow – Female	Khatta Meetha	Nominated	
Tamil Nadu State Film Awards	2009	Special Prize	Abhiyum Naanum	Won	
Vanitha Film Awards	2019	Best Tamil Actress	'96	Won	
Vijay Awards	2006	Favourite Heroine	Unnakum Ennakum	Won	
Vijay Awards	2007	Favourite Heroine	Kireedam	Nominated	
Vijay Awards	2008	Favourite Heroine	Abhiyum Naanum	Nominated	
Vijay Awards	2009	Favourite Heroine	Sarvam	Nominated	
Vijay Awards	2010	Favourite Heroine	Vinnaithaandi Varuvaayaa	Won	
Vijay Awards	2010	Best Actress	Vinnaithaandi Varuvaayaa	Nominated	
Vijay Awards	2011	Favourite Heroine	Mankatha	Nominated	
Vijay Awards	2013	Favourite Heroine	Endrendrum Punnagai	Nominated	
Vijay Awards	2013	Trisha Krishnan	10 Years in Kollywood	Won	
Zee Cine Awards	2011	Best Female Debut	Khatta Meetha	Nominated	
