= Priyan Ottathilanu =

- Theatrical release poster
- Directed by: Antony Sony
- Written by: Abhayakumar K Anil Kurian
- Produced by: Santhosh Thrivikraman
- Starring: Sharafudheen; Nyla Usha; Aparna Das
- Cinematography: P. M. Unnikrishnan
- Edited by: Joel Kavi
- Music by: Lijin Bambino
- Production company: WOW Cinemas
- Release date: 24 June 2022
- Running time: 140 minutes
- Country: India
- Language: Malayalam

Priyan Ottathilanu (transl. Priyan is on the run) is a 2022 Indian Malayalam-language comedy drama film directed by Antony Sony. The story, screenplay and dialogues are written by Abhayakumar K and Anil Kurian. It is produced by Santhosh Thrivikraman under the company WOW Cinemas. The film stars Sharafudheen, Nyla Usha and Aparna Das in the lead roles. The story revolves around Priyan, a young man who is always busy.

Mammootty appears in a cameo role in the film.

== Premise ==
Dr. Priyadarshan alias Priyan, a homeopathy doctor by profession, loves being a multi tasker. He is always occupied and busy. Though he is very helpful to his friends and neighbors, he is not able to find time for his family. He nurtures a passionate dream from childhood, writing, which he keeps pursuing during his busy schedule.

Priyan gets a director for his script with the help of an executive producer who was shooting at his flat. Together they find a producer as well, but he insists that he will only produce the movie if Mammootty is the hero. They get an appointment from Mammootty to meet him at a movie set to narrate the script, but they have to reach the set before the shoot ends at 4:30 PM that day. Mammootty has to go to Dubai after the shoot and afterwards, it will be difficult for the movie to workout.

On the day of his dream coming true, the police asks Priyan to come to the station to remediate a fight between the locals and his flat cleaners. The locals insist that the lady who hit him on his face has to apologize. The police also asks Priyan to drop Priscilla Thankam at the airport. On their way to the airport, Priyan had to drop one of his fans at her home, go to the bank to withdraw money and give it to his flat keeper's son for surgery, go to the flat and make the cleaners apologize to the local, pick his parents up who were coming to his flat for the first time and even negotiate his cousin who was threatening to jump of a building as part of a public protest. While they were about to reach the airport Priscilla sees a car waiting for her and asks Priyan to stop. Priscilla gets down and gets into the car and leaves.

Priyan realizes that his mobile is with Priscilla and so he follows her. Priscilla was being blackmailed by a guy because she hit his cousin while driving. Priyan rescues her from the spot and takes her to the airport. While Priscilla is working with customs for her parcel clearance, Priyan talks with his sister in law and her husband and clears the air between them. He arranges a job for his sister in law at Priscilla's store and they both leave to the film set to narrate the script to Mammootty. But Priyan is late and Mammootty leaves without meeting them. The producer does not want to do the movie anymore and the disappointed director says he is going to Dubai to find a job.

It turns out that Priscilla is a news reporter and the next day she writes an article in the news paper titled "Priyan Ottathilanu" (Priyan is on the run). She details how much Priyan accomplished in a day for everyone around him while he gave little importance for himself and his dreams. Mammootty also reads this news and tells his assistant to call Priyan to listen to the story.

== Cast ==
- Sharafudheen as Dr. Priyadarshan alias Priyan
- Nyla Usha as Priscilla Thangam
- Aparna Das as Neena
- Jaffar Idukki as Sub Inspector Balu
- Biju Sopanam as Chekkuttan
- Harisree Ashokan as Kuppi Rajan
- Sudhi Koppa as Shameer
- Vigi Muraly as Keerthi
- Sminu Sijo as Vanitha
- Leela Samson as Priscilla's mother
- Ashokan as Dr. Sajan Tharakan
- Shivan Sopanam as Kannan, Priyan's father
- Gaurika Deepulal as Priyan's Daughter
- Anarkali Marikar as Jia
- Austin as Strike Person
- R J Mike as Jomon
- Uma K. P. as Priyan's mother
- Deekshith Siva as Sajeevan - Kalasamithi secretary
- Mammootty as himself

== Production ==
The movie is produced by Santhosh Thrivikraman under the company WOW Cinemas. This is the second movie directed by Antony Sony after his directional debut C/O Saira Banu. Priyan Ottathilanu was primarily shot in Kochi. The cinematography is by P. M. Unnikrishnan. Editing is done by Joel Kavi and the songs are composed by Lijin Bambino. The writers of the film are Abhayakumar K and Anil Kurian. Chathur Mukham was this writer duo's previous film released in 2021. They were also co-writers of Punyalan Agarbattis and Su Su Sudhi Vathmeekam.

== Release ==
=== Theatrical ===
The movie was released at theaters in Kerala on 24 June 2022. It had a GCC theatrical release on 30 June 2022. It had rest of India theatrical release on 7 July 2022.

== Reception ==
=== Critical response ===
Priyan Ottathilanu opened to positive reviews from critics and general audience as a 'family feel good movie'. Sajin Shrijith of Indian Express wrote, "Priyan Ottathilanu exists not to make lofty statements but to show us that a modicum of empathy can sometimes make a big difference."

S R Praveen from The Hindu reviewed, "Sharafudheen, who has successfully broken out of his earlier mould of comedian, comes up with another memorable performance after Aarkkariyam. Despite the overdose of feel-goodness, Priyan Ottathilanu manages to keep the audience engaged".

Anjana George of The Times of India noted in her review - "Priyadarshan has been a hyperactive Good Samaritan since his childhood. Through him, the family entertainer once again tells the world that compassion and benevolence still prevail in the universe and there are many such Priyans in this world whom we should acknowledge".

The News Minute mentioned in their review as - "This feel-good film goes a tad overboard with the goodness".

Aswathy Gopalakrishnan wrote on Silverscreen India, "At the end of it all, the city applauds Priyan for sweeping its problems under a giant translucent carpet. A perfect representation of the state of affairs in Indian cities."

Neelima Menon opined on News Nine as, "More than anything else, what keeps us invested in the narrative is Sharafuddin's easy charm. Its very subltle and realistic performance."

Aswin Bharadwaj of Lensmen wrote, " There is no denying that Sharaf U Dheen is terrific in being a real and relatable Priyadarshan. But his Ottam was relatable only in parts."

Sanjith Sidhardhan of OTT play wrote in his review - "Where most feel-good movies would falter is in keeping the pace throughout, but the writing here is so breezy, with all the hurdles along Priyan's way being equally important, that you never feel distracted."

Princy Alexander from Manorama wrote in her review, "Overall, 'Priyan Ottathilanu' is a fun watch and you won't be left disappointed, especially after seeing the climax".
