= Dhwaja (film) =

2018 Indian Kannada-language political action thriller film

- Poster
- Directed by: Ashok Cashyap
- Story by: R. S. Durai Senthilkumar
- Based on: Kodi (2016)
- Produced by: Sudha Basavegowda
- Starring: Ravi Gowda; Priyamani; Divya Urudga; Bala Rajwadi
- Cinematography: Ashok Cashyap
- Edited by: Ravi Chandran
- Music by: Santhosh Narayanan, Chinna
- Production company: CBG Production
- Release date: 27 April 2018
- Country: India
- Language: Kannada

Dhwaja (transl. Flag) is a 2018 Indian Kannada-language political action film written by R. S. Durai Senthilkumar and directed by Ashok Cashyap and produced by Sudha Basavegowda under CBG Productions. It stars Ravi Gowda, Priyamani and Divya Urudga with T.N Seetharam, Veena Sundhar and Bala Rajwadi as a lead negative role. Ravi Gowda who is making his debut through this movie played dual role in his first venture. The film is the remake of 2016 Tamil film Kodi. The film's features songs composed by Santhosh Narayanan and Chinna, with the former's music re-used from the original, Kodi. The background score was composed by Chinna. The cinematography is performed by the director Ashok Cashyap himself.

Besides Bangalore, the filming took place in Mysore, and the climax scene was shot at Mysore, Karnataka.

== Cast ==
- Ravi Gowda in a dual role as
  - Dhwaja
  - Janardhan
- Priyamani as Ramya
- Divya Urudga as Moote Mahalakshmi
- Bala Rajwadi as Balaramanna
- Veena Sundhar as Dhwaja and Janardhan's mother
- T. N. Seetharam as president of the opposition party and former CM

== Music ==
The soundtrack was composed by Santhosh Narayanan, who also composed the original 2016 film, reusing all the tunes from the original soundtrack. The audio rights of the film were acquired by Sony Music India. The complete album was released on 25 April 2018 at Bengaluru.

Tracklist
No.	Title	Lyrics	Singer(s)	Length
1.	"Oora Devru"	Manju Mandavya	Vijay Prakash	2:59
2.	"Hey Malli"	Chandan Shankar	Vijay Prakash	3:37
3.	"Jogulave Jogulave"	K. Kalyan	Shweta Mohan	4:00
4.	"Agala Eshto Akasha"	Kaviraj	Sonu Nigam, Shweta Mohan	3:59
5.	"Dhwaja"	Ravi Gowda	Vasishta N. Simha	3:26
Total length:				18:20

== Critical reception ==
The New Indian Express wrote, "Although a story like Dhwaja is universal, the film having nothing original leaves a sour impression about the makers. It seems like the film was made only to cash in on the elections that are around the corner." The Times of India wrote, "This film has good visuals, an interesting tale of love and betrayal against a political backdrop, and a lot of commercial elements. If you're someone looking for that, this might just interest you".
