= Dada (2023 film) =

2023 Indian film by Ganesh K. Babu

- Theatrical Release Poster
- Directed by: Ganesh K. Babu
- Written by: Ganesh K. Babu
- Produced by: S. Ambeth Kumar
- Starring: Kavin; Aparna Das
- Cinematography: Ezhil Arasu K
- Edited by: Kathiresh Alagesan
- Music by: Jen Martin
- Production company: Olympia Movies
- Distributed by: Red Giant Movies; Ayngaran International
- Release date: 10 February 2023
- Running time: 135 minutes
- Country: India
- Language: Tamil

Dada (transl. Father) is a 2023 Indian Tamil-language coming-of-age romantic comedy drama film written and directed by Ganesh K. Babu, in his directorial debut. Produced by Olympia Movies, the film stars Kavin and Aparna Das in the lead roles, alongside K. Bhagyaraj, Aishwariyaa Bhaskaran and VTV Ganesh. The story follows a college student who embraces fatherhood, providing care and love to his child while facing the challenges of life as a single father. The film has music composed by Jen Martin, editing by K. Ezhil Arasu K and cinematography handled by Kathiresh Alagesan.

Dada was released theatrically on 10 February 2023 to positive reviews from critics and was a blockbuster at the box office.

== Plot ==
Mani and Sindhu, final-year college students, are in a relationship. Sindhu is a sweet and bold girl, while Mani is possessive, aggressive, and short-tempered. When Sindhu becomes pregnant, Mani asks her to get an abortion, but she disagrees. Their parents disapprove of the relationship, so Mani and Sindhu move in together and decide to deal with the pregnancy on their own. Due to financial troubles and stress regarding the unwanted pregnancy, Mani mistreats and neglects Sindhu.

During her checkup, the doctor tells Sindhu that she has high BP and is extremely malnourished, which can be dangerous for the baby. Mani's alcoholism causes more issues in their relationship. During an argument, Mani asks Sindhu to leave him alone and tells her to die for torturing and ruining his life. Right after the fight, Sindhu goes into labour and ends up giving birth alone as Mani ignores her calls. When he finally reaches the hospital to see Sindhu, he finds her missing, with the baby left behind. Deciding to be a single father, Mani names his child Aditya and raises him with the help of his best friends.

After a few years, Mani lands a new job where he meets Sindhu, who is the manager. Mani, a single father, has become a calm, mature man, while Sindhu appears quiet and depressed. Mani and Sindhu have lingering feelings for each other, yet remain reserved and distant at work. He also protects her from a creepy coworker.

Mani gets a job in Bangalore and decides to leave his current one. On his last day, he brings Aditya to his office for his farewell. When Aditya tells Sindhu his name (Aditya was the name Sindhu had suggested for their child) and that Mani is his father, Sindhu realises that Aditya is her son and breaks down crying. She confronts her parents over the phone for lying to her.

Seeing her break down, Mani tells Sindhu that she was right to leave him, as he was a bad partner, but she should not have abandoned the baby. Sindhu reveals that her parents had told her that the baby had died. She left Mani as she blamed him for not being there during her delivery, due to which she reached the hospital very late and had a complicated delivery. Over the years, she thought about dying herself and wished Mani had come looking for her. Sindhu apologises to Mani. Mani forgives and accepts her, and they reunite as a family with their son.

== Cast ==
- Kavin as Manikandan "Mani"
- Aparna Das as Sindhu
- Master Ilan Arjunan as Aditya Manikandan
  - Master Arav and Master Bedal Sanjay as toddler Aditya
    - Baby Nalan Premkumar as infant Aditya
- K. Bhagyaraj as Mani's father
- Aishwariyaa Bhaskaran as Mani's mother
- VTV Ganesh as Gokul
- Pradeep Antony as Saravanan
- K. Harish as Amith
- Fouzee Hidayah as Sadhana
- Kamaldeep
- Arvind Ezhilarasan as Manikandan's brother
- Sandy (special appearance in the song "Namma Thamizh Folku")

== Production ==
The project was announced by debutant filmmaker Ganesh K. Babu, and also marked Aparna Das's debut as the lead actress in Tamil after previously making her debut in a small role in Nelson's directorial venture Beast (2022).

The principal photography of the film began in March 2022 and the film was predominantly shot and set in Chennai. The shooting of the film was wrapped up in September 2022.

== Themes ==
Dada is loosely based on incidents in the life of Ganesh K. Babu's friend and focuses on a young man's journey of adoring the role of fatherhood and being a single parent. It sends out a strong message that parenthood is gender neutral.

== Soundtrack ==
Dada

Soundtrack album by Jen Martin
- Genre: Feature film soundtrack
- Length: 32:33
- Language: Tamil
- Label: Think Music India
- Producer: Jen Martin

Jen Martin chronology
Dada (2024)	Bloody Beggar (2024)

The soundtrack was composed by newcomer Jen Martin.

Track listing
No.	Title	Writer(s)	Singer(s)	Length
1.	"DADA Song"	Ashique AR	Sathya Narayanan, Jen Martin, Kidakuzhi Mariyammal, Prarthana Sriram	5:06
2.	"Eppudraa Theme"		"Eppudraa" Rohan	1:16
3.	"Glory After Struggle Theme"			1:53
4.	"Kirutu Kirutu"	Vishnu Edavan	Anthony Daasan	3:29
5.	"Klesa Kadhala"	Mohan Rajan	Janani, Malvi Suderesan, Kalyan Manjunath	3:50
6.	"Namma Thamizh Folku"	Ashique AR	Jen Martin, Vaisagh	4:33
7.	"Pogathey"	Vishnu Edavan	Yuvan Shankar Raja	5:22
8.	"Redemption of Dada"	Ashique AR	Jen Martin, Sathya Narayanan	1:35
9.	"Thayaga Naan"	Vishnu Edavan	Sathya Narayanan	3:05
10.	"Thayaga Naan (Reprise)"	Vishnu Edavan	Dhanyashree	2:24
Total length:				32:33

== Release ==
=== Theatrical ===
The film was released in over 400 theatres across Tamil Nadu. The Tamil theatrical release for the film was acquired by Red Giant Movies and overseas rights bagged by Ayngaran International. After 2 years, of the Tamil version, Telugu version named as Papa, was released on 13 June 2025.

=== Home media ===
The digital streaming rights of the film has been bagged by Amazon Prime Video while the satellite rights has sold to Kalaignar TV. The film was made available on the streaming platform from 10 March 2023 but the Tamil version of the film was removed soon and only Hindi version was made available. Many fans requested to release the Tamil version but the producer S. Ambeth Kumar was adamant not to release Tamil version in OTT.

== Awards ==
- Won - Filmfare Critics Award for Best Actress - Tamil - Aparna Das

== Reception ==
=== Critical response ===
On the review aggregator website Rotten Tomatoes, 80% of 5 critics' reviews are positive, with an average rating of 7/10.

Logesh Balachandran of The Times of India gave 3.5/5 stars and wrote "Dada is a well-written drama with the right mix of comedy, emotion and love." Navein Darshan of The New Indian Express gave 3.5/5 stars and wrote "The film is emotional, but is equally fun with a strong undercurrent of tasteful humour."

Thinkal Menon of OTTplay gave 3.5/5 stars and wrote "Dada's target seems to be young audience, but the right packaging of emotions and instantly likeable characters are adequate enough to attract all sections of audience." Janani K from India Today gave 3/5 stars and wrote "Dada is a heartwarming film that talks about parenting and relationship woes."

Haricharan Pudipeddi of Hindustan Times wrote "Kavin and Aparna Das-starrer rises above mainstream movies and sends out a strong message on parenthood." Bhuvanesh Chandar of The Hindu wrote "Thanks to ample support from its lead actors, debutant director Ganesh K Babu’s film about a single father and a fractured relationship turns out to be a wholesome entertainer despite few missteps."
