= Aparna Das =

Indian actress

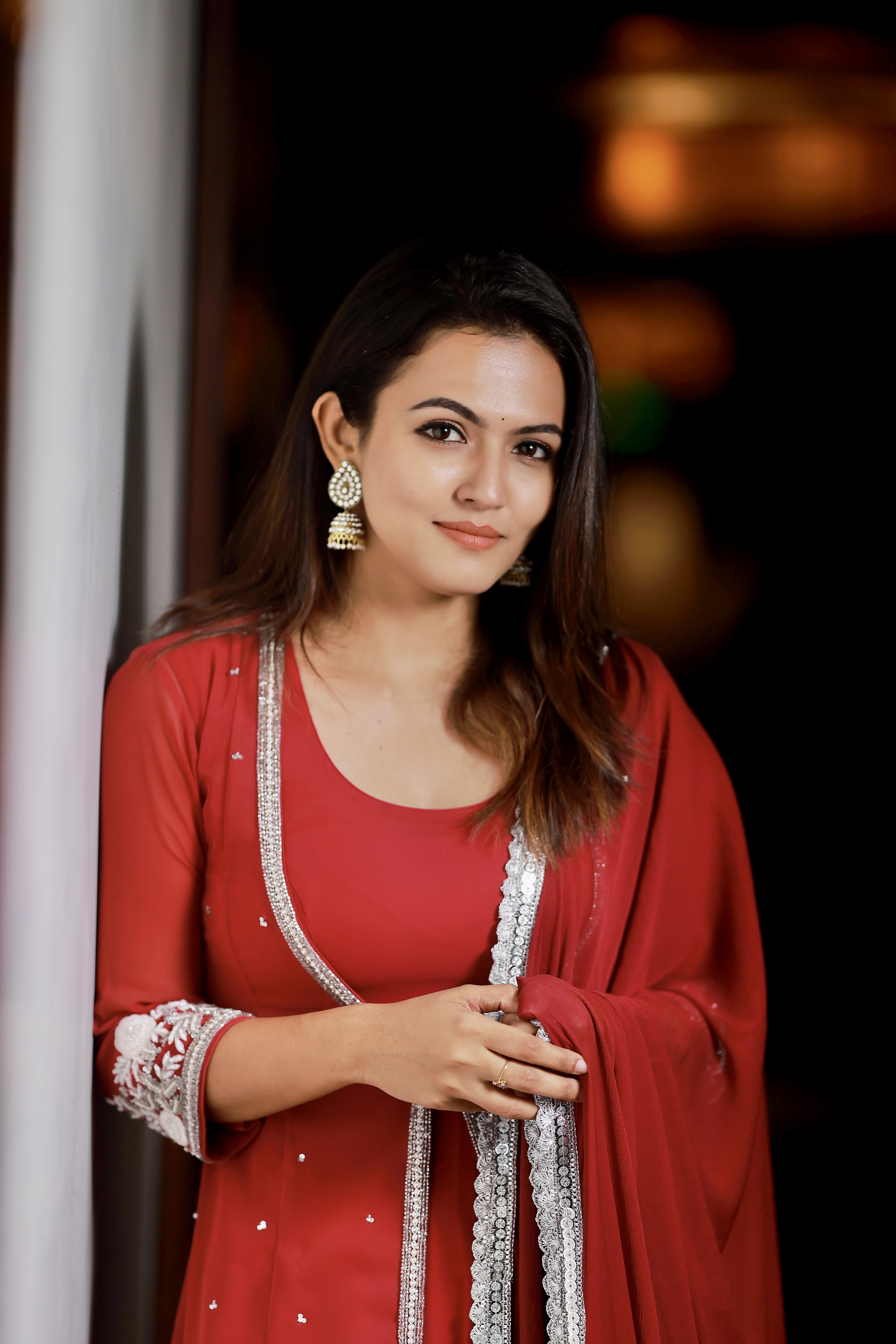
- Aparna in 2023
- Born: 10 September 1995 (age 30); Muscat, Oman
- Education: Sri Krishna Arts and Science College, Coimbatore, Tamil Nadu
- Occupation: Actress
- Years active: 2018–present
- Spouse: Deepak Parambol (m. 2024)

Aparna Das (born 10 September 1995) is an Indian actress who acts mainly in Malayalam and Tamil films. She made her Malayalam and Tamil Debut with Njan Prakashan (2018) and Beast (2022) orderly. Aparna is a recipient of Filmfare Critics Award for Best Actress - Tamil for Dada (2023).

== Early life ==
Aparna was born on 10 September 1995 to Malayali parents settled in Muscat, Oman. She completed her primary education from Gangothri English Medium School, Nenmara and Indian School, Darsait. She is a graduate from Sri Krishna Arts and Science College, Coimbatore. After completing her Post-Graduation degree, she worked as an accountant. She had also worked as model for establishments and magazines during and after her studies.

== Career ==
While working in Muscat after completing her master's in business administration, Aparna was cast in the satirical comedy film Njan Prakashan (2018) by Sathyan Anthikad, after he watched one of her TikTok videos thus making her debut in Malayalam cinema. Later she played the female lead in Manoharam (2019) opposite Vineeth Sreenivasan. Aparna appeared in the Tamil film Beast (2022). She also acted in the Tamil movie Dada where her role was appreciated. She also debuted in Telugu with Aadikeshava (2023). In 2024 Aparna starred in the Malayalam mystery thriller Anand Sreebala. She later appeared in the Telegu film PA...PA...(O Naanna).Her Performance in Dada earned her the Filmfare Critics Award for Best Actress - Tamil.

== Personal life ==
Aparna Das married actor Deepak Parambol on 24 April 2024.

== Filmography ==
Key
†	Denotes films that have not yet been released

=== Films ===
Year	Title	Role	Notes	Ref.
2018	Njan Prakashan	Bahuleyan's one-sided lover		
2019	Manoharam	Sreeja		
2022	Beast	Aparna	Tamil film	
2022	Priyan Ottathilanu	Neena		
2023	Dada	Sindhu	Tamil film Won, Filmfare Critics Award for Best Actress - Tamil	
2023	Aadikeshava	Vajra	Telugu film	
2024	Secret Home	Ayana		
2024	Secret	Ameya		
2024	Anand Sreebala	Sreebala		
2025	Written & Directed by God	Lisy Jijo		

=== Music videos ===
Year	Title	Language	Ref.
2021	Neeyam Nizhalil	Malayalam	
