= Alai (film) =

- DVD cover
- Directed by: Vikram Kumar
- Written by: Vikram Kumar
- Produced by: G. V. Prasad
- Starring: Silambarasan; Trisha
- Cinematography: S. Murthy
- Edited by: A. Sreekar Prasad
- Music by: Vidyasagar
- Production company: Damini Enterprise
- Release date: 10 September 2003
- Running time: 158 minutes
- Country: India
- Language: Tamil

Alai (transl. Wave) is a 2003 Indian Tamil-language romantic comedy film directed by Vikram Kumar. The film stars Silambarasan and Trisha, while Raghuvaran, Saranya, and Vivek played supporting roles. The film was produced by G. V. Prasad and the score and soundtrack were composed by Vidyasagar. Alai was released on 10 September 2003, and became a commercial failure.

== Plot ==
Aathi and Meera are college students who first meet in a bar and fight for a silly reason. Aathi with his friends go to his friend's village and there he sees Meera who is also there with her friends. The groups went to a village festival where Aathi falls for Meera after seeing her in a traditional attire. There some goons harass Meera with reflecting light on Meera who is wearing a sari. Aathi saw this and beats up the goons. Meera immediately falls for Aathi. Aathi learns that his friend who is getting married in 3 days was actually in love with someone else and that his marriage was his father’s alliance with a wealthy family to pay off his debt through dowry. Meera discovers that her best friend is in love with a guy. On that night Meera’s friend brought her to the guy's house where Meera mistaken Aathi as Her friends’ lover and Aathi mistaken Meera as his best friend Lover. This was all cleared the next day when they introduce Meera and Aathi as their best friend which enlighten both of them. They planned to elope and registered their marriage which Aathi and Meera helped. Then Aathi and Meera return to their houses where they realise they love each other. And much to their surprise their houses are beside each other. Then Aathi tries to tell Meera about his love, but she doesn't care. And it is shown that Meera also loves him and then there comes a song called En Ragasiya Kanavugal. And then Aathi goes to Meera's house and sees her talking to her friend about him. Then again, a song comes where again Aathi and Meera just romance each other. And then Aathi's father arranges him marriage with a businessman's daughter because of his debt. And then Aathi and Meera separate, and Aathi tries to calm Meera who is crying which is heard by his to be fiancé and she says that she is not interested in this marriage. After that, Aathi ties the nuptial thread around Meera's neck on the wedding stage with everyone's blessings and Meera happily accepts it.

== Cast ==
- Silambarasan as Aathikesavan “Aathi”
- Trisha as Meera
- Vivek as Aathi's friend
- Raghuvaran as Natarajan, Aathi's father
- Saranya as Nirmala (Aathi's mother)
- Kuralarasan as Gopi, Aathi's brother
- Nizhalgal Ravi as Meera's father
- Bharathi as Meera's mother
- Nassar
- Srinath as Aathi's friend
- Lavanya as Anu
- Cool Suresh as Aathi's friend
- Kim Sharma in a special appearance in the song "Paiyya Paiyya"
- Raju Sundaram in a special appearance in the song "Alai Adikuthu"
- K. Sivasankar in a special appearance as a dance master
- Shobi in a special appearance in the song "Alai Adikuthu"

== Production ==
Prior to release, the film made headlines when Silambarasan revealed that he was to undergo an image makeover for the film and move away from his "mass" image after appearing in such roles in Kadhal Azhivathillai and Dum. Two songs were shot in Switzerland.

== Soundtrack ==
There are six songs composed by Vidyasagar. Soundtrack received a positive review from Sajahan Waheed of New Straits Times saying Vidyasagar "is surely at his best in this six-song soundtrack [..]". "Solakattu Bommai" is loosely inspired from Vidyasagar's Malayalam song "Chinga Masam" in Meesa Madhavan.

| Song title | Singers | Lyrics |
|---|---|---|
| "Alai Adikuthu" | Shankar Mahadevan | Kabilan |
| "En Ragasiya Kanavukal" | Karthik, Srivarthini | Thamarai |
| "Nee Oru Desam" | Sujatha Mohan, KK | Yugabharathi |
| "Paiya Paiya" | Mathangi, Tippu | Arivumathi |
| "Solakattu Bommai" | Devan, Pop Shalini | Pa. Vijay |
| "Thinga Kizhamaiyaana" | Timmy, Karthik | Pa. Vijay |

== Reception ==
Sify wrote, "There is no redeeming factor as even the music of Vidyasagar is not placed well and stands out most of the time". The reviewer criticised Silambarasan for imitating Rajinikanth in many scenes and felt Trisha was wasted, but appreciated Vivek's comedy, concluding, "All in all Alai is an insufferable dud". Mokkarasu of Kalki called Vivek's comedy the only relief and felt the old plot did not have any newness in presentation and the dramatic climax without any major twists reminds of 1960s films. He concluded saying director's formula of four songs, four fights, little bit of comedy is outdated and advised him to better concentrate on script hereafter. S. R. Ashok Kumar from The Hindu noted that "the youthful exploits of Silambarasan, the glamour of Trisha and the winsome music of Vidyasagar fail to do the trick, for the simple reason that the film lacks a taut screenplay with well-knit episodes". Indiainfo wrote "Debutant director Vikram perhaps thought the film would be sure hit if makes a film like Rajini's but he failed miserably there. A very boring film".

The film became a box office failure. Silambarasan and Trisha did not pair again until Vinnaithaandi Varuvaayaa (2010) by Gautham Vasudev Menon, which became a commercial success.
