= Karthik Dial Seytha Yenn =

2020 Indian Tamil-language short film directed by Gautham Vasudev Menon

- Title card
- Directed by: Gautham Vasudev Menon
- Written by: Gautham Vasudev Menon
- Produced by: Gautham Vasudev Menon
- Starring: Silambarasan; Trisha Krishnan
- Cinematography: Gautham Vasudev Menon; Silambarasan
- Edited by: Anthony
- Music by: A. R. Rahman
- Production company: Ondraga Entertainment
- Release date: 21 May 2020 (YouTube)
- Running time: 12 minutes
- Country: India
- Language: Tamil

Karthik Dial Seytha Yenn (transl. The number Karthik dialed) is a 2020 Indian Tamil-language short film written and directed by Gautham Vasudev Menon. A sequel to his feature film Vinnaithaandi Varuvaayaa (2010), it stars Silambarasan and Trisha Krishnan reprising their roles from that film. The short was released on 21 May 2020 on YouTube.

== Plot ==
Filmmaker Karthik is at home during the COVID-19 pandemic in Tamil Nadu without work as theatres are shut down, affecting his career as a screenwriter, While experiencing writer's block, he hesitantly calls his ex-girlfriend Jessie, who fled the effects of the pandemic in New York City and is under lockdown in Kerala. Jessie, who is now married to Roy with two children, answers Karthik's call and tells him about their lives during the lockdown situation. In the conversation, Karthik again confesses his love for Jessie and says he still needs her, despite knowing that she is married with children. Jessie refuses his proposal as she has moved on with her husband and refers to him as her "third child". Jessie supports Karthik emotionally and says that he is a great artist. After the phone call, Karthik resumes his writing and composes Kamal & Kadambari: A Love Story.

== Cast ==
- Silambarasan as Karthik Sivakumar
- Trisha Krishnan as Jessie Thekekuthu

== Production ==
Gautham Vasudev Menon planned to direct a feature-length sequel to his 2010 film Vinnaithaandi Varuvaayaa which was titled Ondraga, a road movie which would focus on and his best friends from college travelling to the United States to attend a wedding ten years after the events of the first film. Silambarasan, who portrayed Karthik, was not expected to reprise his role. However, the project did not materialise. In April 2020, Silambarasan and Menon started shooting for a short sequel, eventually titled Karthik Dial Seytha Yenn. Silambarasan's scenes were shot at his home in Chennai. Trisha Krishnan, the lead actress of Vinnaithaandi Varuvayaa, also reprised her role. The film was primarily shot using an iPhone and filmed indoors due to the restrictions in order to curb COVID-19. A. R. Rahman, composer of Vinnaithaandi Varuvayaa, returned to compose background music for the short.

== Release ==
The short film was released through the YouTube channel of Ondraga Entertainment on 21 May 2020.

== Critical reception ==
The short received mixed reviews. Kirubhakar Purushothaman of Cinema Express said, "The filmmaking is minimalistic with not-so-seamless cuts. Of course, one is expected to cut slack for the film given the immense constraints the team has made this under. But it's a paradox when you realise there would have been no Karthik Dial Seytha Yenn without the coronavirus or the constraints." Baradwaj Rangan of Film Companion wrote "A reflection on the 12-odd minutes spent with the characters that continue to haunt us, even after 10 years." Manoj Kumar R. of The Indian Express stated "Karthik Dial Seytha Yenn is nothing but Gautham Menon giving himself a much-needed pep-talk in front of the mirror before he begins to write his next big film." Srivatsan S. of The Hindu wrote the film as "a letter of unrequited love" and called that "even after ten years of the first film, the characters linger in the mind and with a simple storyline being minimal and realistic".
