= ITFA Best New Actress Award =

The ITFA Best New Actress Award is given by the state government as part of its annual International Tamil Film Awards for Tamil films.

== The list ==
Here is a list of the award winners and the films for which they won.

Year	Actress	Film
2008	Sana Khan	Silambattam
2004	Sonia Agarwal	Kadhal Kondein
2003	Trisha Krishnan	Lesa Lesa

== See also ==
- Tamil cinema
- Cinema of India
