= Ameer Sultan =

Indian film director and actor

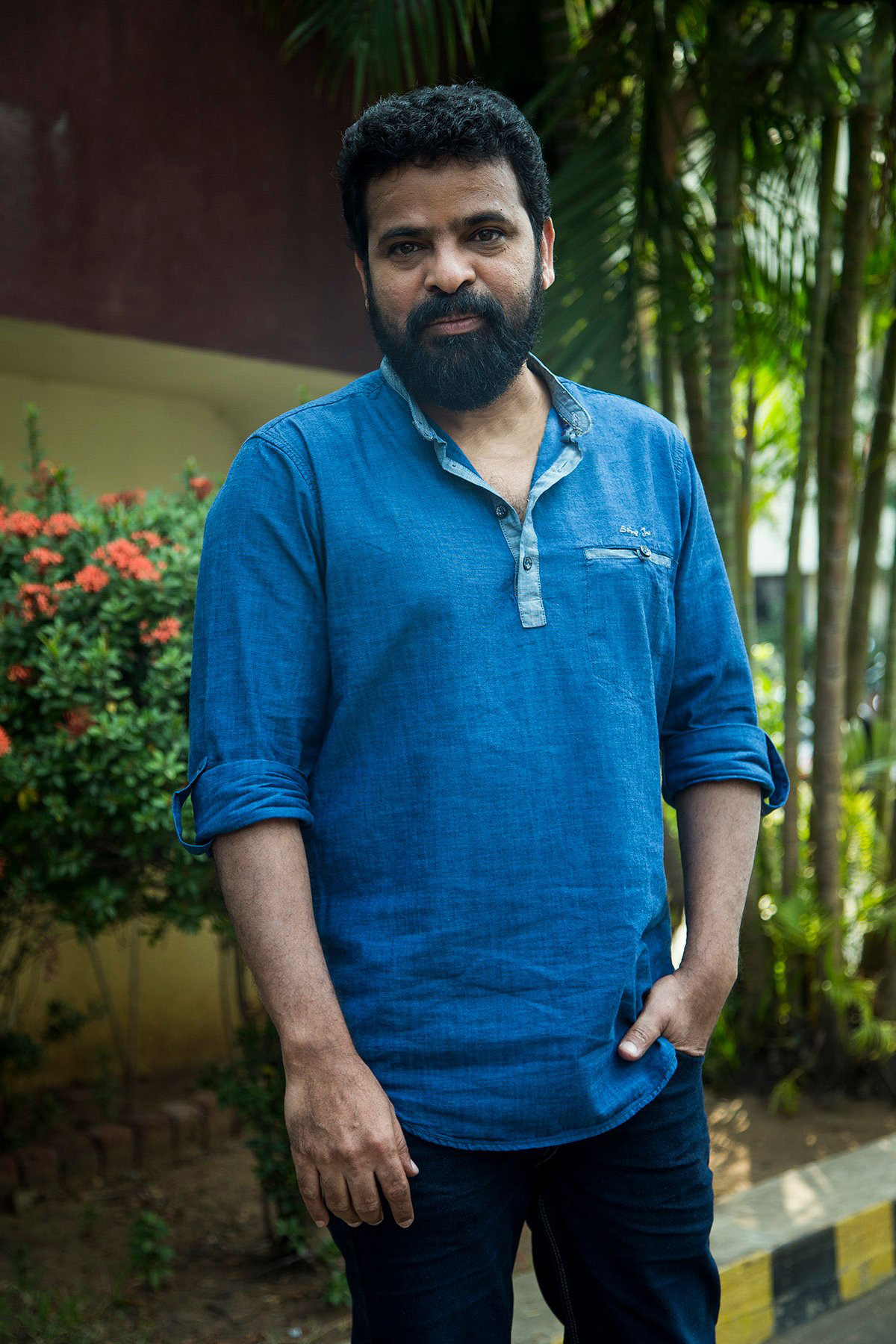
- Ameer at Santhanathevan Movie Launch
- Born: Ameer M. 5 December 1967 (age 58); Madurai, Tamil Nadu, India
- Occupations: Film director, Film producer, Screenwriter, Actor

Ameer Sultan (born 5 December 1967) is an Indian film director, film producer, screenwriter and actor, working in the Tamil film industry.

== Early life and career ==
Ameer Sultan was born in Madurai, Tamil Nadu, India. He initially studied economics and worked as an entrepreneur before starting to work as an assistant director to Tamil filmmaker Bala on his award-winning film Sethu in 1999 and Nandhaa in 2001. Shortly after, he directed his first film, the romantic comedy Mounam Pesiyadhe (2002). The film starred Suriya in the lead and became Trisha Krishnan's first release featuring her in a leading role. The same year, he began his own production company, Teamwork Production House.

His second directorial was the mystery thriller Raam, which he produced himself. It was released three years later, in 2005. The film, which revolves around an autistic teenager, portrayed by Jiiva, who is highly attached to his mother, but becomes the main suspect in her murder, received critical acclaim, with Jeeva and the film's composer Yuvan Shankar Raja winning awards at the 2005 Cyprus International Film Festival. It also became Jeeva's first successful film in the film industry, who till then, had appeared in two unsuccessful home productions only.

In 2007, he directed the drama Paruthiveeran set in a village in Tamil Nadu, which marked the debut of Karthi, younger son of Sivakumar and brother of Suriya. Karthi as well as Priyamani, who performed the female lead, won several notable prizes for their performances. Paruthiveeran remains Ameer's most acclaimed work, having received six Filmfare Awards South including the Best Film and Best Director trophies, two National Film Awards, two Tamil Nadu State Film Awards and four Vijay Awards. The film further fetched accolades at international platform, winning the Best Film Award at the Osian's Cinefan Festival of Asian and Arab Cinema and Netpac Special Mention award at the Berlin International Film Festival. His fourth directorial, Aadhi Bhagavan, starring Jayam Ravi and Neetu Chandra, released in 2013. Later, he won the Ananda Vikatan Cinema Award Best Supporting Actor for Vada Chennai (2018). He starred as lead actor in the political drama Uyir Thamizhukku (2024).

== Filmography ==
=== As a film director, producer and writer ===
Year	Title	Credited as			Notes
Year	Title	Director	Producer	Writer	Notes
2002	Mounam Pesiyadhe	✓	✗	✓	Also lyricist for "Love All Day" and "Kannil Kanthamey"
2005	Raam	✓	✓	✓	
2007	Paruthiveeran	✓	✓	✓	Filmfare Award for Best Director – Tamil
2009	Yogi	✗	✓	✓	
2013	Ameerin Aadhi Bhagavan	✓	✗	✓	

=== As an actor ===
Year	Title	Role	Notes
1999	Sethu	College Student	Uncredited role
2002	Mounam Pesiyadhe	Peon	Uncredited role
2009	Yogi	Yogeshwaran (Yogi)	
2011	Yuddham Sei	Dancer	Special appearance
2014	Ninaithathu Yaaro	Himself	Guest appearance
2018	Vada Chennai	Rajan	Ananda Vikatan Cinema Award Best Supporting Actor
2022	Maaran	Parthiban	
2024	Uyir Thamizhukku	MGR Pandian	
2025	Bison Kaalamaadan	Pandiaraja	
TBA	Maayavalai	Rajan	Guest appearance
TBA	Maakaali	To be announced	

== Discography ==
List of songs sung by Ameer
Year	Film	Song	Composer
2007	Paruthiveeran	"Sari Gama Pathani"	Yuvan Shankar Raja
2009	Yogi	"Seermevum Koovathiley"	Yuvan Shankar Raja

== Controversy ==
On 24 October 2008, Ameer was arrested. Being a Tamil activist, he took part in a film rally condemning state atrocities against Tamils in Sri Lanka, organised by director Bharathiraja, also a Tamil activist, and other prominent Tamil directors, actors, and producers. The rally was part of statewide protests across Tamil Nadu in 2008 condemning Sri Lanka. During the rally, Ameer and fellow director Seeman made speeches criticising the Indian government and expressing support to the Liberation Tigers of Tamil Eelam, a Tamil separatist group on the island and condemning the genocide of Tamils in Sri Lanka. The two were later released on bail with the help of their assistant directors, Bharathiraja, and actor R. Sarath Kumar. Other Film directors such as Balu Mahendra, Bhagyaraj, Cheran, R K Selvamani, V Sekar, Bala, Rajkapoor, lyricists Arivumathi, Snehan and others waited from 8 am for the two directors' release.

== Awards ==
- 2007 – Filmfare Award for Best Film – Tamil – Paruthiveeran
- 2007 – Filmfare Award for Best Director – Tamil – Paruthiveeran
- 2007 – Osian's Cinefan Festival of Asian and Arab Cinema – Paruthiveeran
- 2007 – Berlin International Film Festival – Special Mention – Paruthiveeran
- 2018 – Ananda Vikatan Cinema Award for Best Supporting Actor – Vada Chennai
