= Mounam Pesiyadhe =

- Official poster
- Directed by: Ameer
- Written by: Ameer
- Produced by: Ganesh Raghu; Karthik Radhakrishnan; Venky Narayanan; Rajan Radhakrishnan
- Starring: Suriya; Nandha; Trisha; Neha Pendse
- Cinematography: Ramji
- Edited by: Suresh Urs
- Music by: Yuvan Shankar Raja
- Production company: Aparajeeth Films
- Release date: 13 December 2002
- Running time: 148 minutes
- Country: India
- Language: Tamil

Mounam Pesiyadhe (transl. Silence spoke) is a 2002 Indian Tamil-language romantic drama film, written and directed by Ameer (in his directorial debut). It stars Suriya in the lead role along with newcomers Nandha, Trisha, Neha Pendse and choreographer-turned-actor Anju Mahendran in supporting roles, while Laila appears in a cameo role. It also marks the first film for Trisha as a lead actress after playing a cameo role in Jodi (1999). The major part of the film is shot in Pondicherry. The film was released on 13 December 2002 and became a commercial hit. It was remade in Telugu as Aadanthe Ado Type (2003) and later dubbed in the same language as Kanchu in 2013.

== Plot ==
Gautham and Kannan have been close friends since childhood. Gautham owns a restaurant, while Kannan is a sales executive in a firm. Kannan is in love with Mahalakshmi, while Gautham has no interest in girls and prefers to remain single despite his family's keenness for him to get married. Sandhya is a relative of Kannan, and their relatives plan to get them married. Kannan fears his father and cannot tell him about his love. So he asks Gautham to meet Sandhya and tell her about Kannan and Maha's love.

Gautham agrees and informs Sandhya about Kannan's love with Maha. Sandhya also says that even she is uninterested in the marriage proposal and instead prefers to marry someone like Gautham. Hearing this, Gautham is shocked and confused.

Kannan and Sandhya's parents realize that neither Kannan nor Sandhya is interested in marriage and cancel the wedding plans. Meanwhile, Gautham develops an affection towards Sandhya. Gautham receives frequent phone calls and believes they are from Sandhya. Gautham also receives gifts, which he also believes Sandhya sent.

One day, Sandhya calls Gautham to a restaurant. Gautham believes that she has called to convey her love but is shocked when she introduces Aravind as her lover. She also says that even Aravind is like Gautham, who was uninterested in girls but somehow is convinced by Sandhya. Gautham starts worrying and gets confused about what is happening, as he believed the phone calls and gifts were from Sandhya.

Maha's father gets angry knowing about her love and engages a few thugs to beat up Kannan. Kannan is injured, which angers Gautham. Gautham smashes the thugs and scolds Maha's father for getting involved in such activities. Maha's father realises his mistake and apologises. Kannan and Maha's wedding is fixed.

On the day of Kannan and Maha's wedding, Gautham walks alone in the street thinking about his love failure. Suddenly, a car comes in front of him, and in the driver's seat is Swetha, his secret one-sided lover. She walks towards Gautham and proposes her love. A flashback is shown where Swetha and Gautham were college mates and she was in love with him, but he did not reciprocate and avoided her.

On the last day of college, she told Gautham that she would always keep following him and would never forget him. As she said, she kept following Gautham, calling him, and sending him frequent gifts, which he misunderstood as being from Sandhya. Gautham realises her true love and accepts it. The film ends with Gautham and Swetha leaving together happily in the car, with Swetha driving.

== Cast ==
- Suriya as Gowtham
- Nandha as Kannan
- Trisha as Sandhya (Voice dubbed by Savitha Reddy)
- Neha Pendse as Mahalakshmi (credited as Maha; also dubbed by Savitha Reddy)
- Anju Mahendran as Selvam
- Duraipandi as Sundaram
- Vaidyanathan as Govindaraj
- V. C. Venkatesh as Shankaran
- Gopikumar as Shanmuganathan
- Nandha Saravanan as Auto Pandi
- Govindaraj as Palanisamy
- Kamalesh as Aravind
- Senthil as Sudhakar
- Johnprakash as Raj
- Master Tarun Kumar as Suresh
- Viji as Savithri
- Vijayalakshmi as Kamakshi
- Lakshmi as Varalakshmi
- Vaishnavi as Lakshmi
- Hemalatha as Shanthi
- Swetha as Indu
- Laila as Swetha (cameo; also dubbed by Savitha Reddy)
- Ameer as peon in Mahalakshmi's father's office
- Vidharth as drunkard
- Ganesh Babu as Shopper
- RJ Sanobar Sultana (cameo)
- Vasanthi in the song "Arupadhu Aayidichu"

== Production ==
The film's title is based on a serial that was supposed to be directed by Vikram with Ameer working as the assistant director. It also marks the first film for Trisha as lead actress. Shooting took place in India and abroad. Moreover, a huge set worth ₹30 lakh (equivalent to ₹1.2 crore or US$130,000 in 2026) was erected by art director Rajeevan at Pondicherry for a song. One song was shot at AVM Studios. The rest of the songs were shot at locations in Mysore and Puducherry.

== Soundtrack ==
The soundtrack was composed by Yuvan Shankar Raja and was released on 6 October 2002. Upon release, it was very much appreciated and became very successful. Yuvan himself claimed the album to be "the best he ever created since he became music director" till then.

Song	Singer(s)	Lyricist	Length
"En Anbae En Anbae"	Shankar Mahadevan	Kamakodiyan	4:45
"Chinna Chinnathai"	Hariharan, Yuvan Shankar Raja	Pudhuvai Nambi	5:16
"Aadatha Aatamellam"	Karthik	Snehan	4:29
"Eh Nanbane Kopam"	Hariharan, Shankar Mahadevan	Snehan	4:13
"Arupadhu Aayidichu"	Manikka Vinayagam, Malgudi Subha	Vaali	3:50
"Ilamai Oorai Sutrum"	Nidhesh Gopalan, Yuvan Shankar Raja	Vaali	4:01
"Love All Day"	Yuvan Shankar Raja	Ameer	1:52
"Kannil Kanthamey"	S. P. Balasubrahmanyam, Thara	Ameer	4:50

== Reception ==
Malathi Rangarajan of The Hindu wrote that Ameer "has introduced an element of suspense in the story. The end shows that the director has tried to make things a little different. The comedy merges well with the main narration and the asides are examples of healthy humour". Visual Dasan of Kalki called the film "above average". Cinesouth wrote, "Director Amir has avoided the velvet-cushioned treatment that is so typical of movies while narrating his story and screenplay. We enjoy the film when it tries to present comedy in its dialogues. It's good to watch the film explore its space completely. But, when it begins to look artificial, the effect is destroyed".
