= Lion (2015 film) =

2015 Indian film by Satyadev

- Theatrical release poster
- Directed by: Satyadev
- Written by: Satyadev, Venkatesh kilaru
- Produced by: Rudrapati Ramana Rao
- Starring: Nandamuri Balakrishna; Trisha Krishnan; Radhika Apte
- Cinematography: Venkata Prasad
- Edited by: Gautham Raju
- Music by: Mani Sharma
- Production company: Sri Lakshmi Venkateswara Cinema
- Distributed by: Eros International
- Release date: 14 May 2015 (India)
- Running time: 156 mins
- Country: India
- Language: Telugu
- Box office: ₹28.95 crore

Lion is a 2015 Indian Telugu-language action thriller film produced by Rudrapati Ramana Rao under the SLV cinema banner and directed by debutant Satyadev. The plot of the movie is loosely based on the Hollywood movie Unknown. The film stars Nandamuri Balakrishna, Trisha Krishnan, and Radhika Apte with music composed by Mani Sharma. It was a commercial failure at the box office. It was dubbed in Hindi as Ek Tsunami Jwalamukhi.

== Plot ==
Later, Bhupati and Malathi admit that the hospital staff threatened to halt their son's treatment if they refused to cope with their demands, and that Mahalakshmi, who is their niece, was also blackmailed along with them. Bose's family reveal that they were also threatened by Sravan to act as if they don't know him.

Bose starts a deadly game of self-killing when Bharadwaj strives to shield him with the help of his bodyguard Mukthar, telecasting it personally to his house. With the help of his uncle Lingam, he telecasts the chase to the Media by sending false news that Godse killed Achyutharamaiah. CBI deputy chief Indrani views it and recognizes Bose, realizing in the process that he is trying to convey something to them. She types "Dead" in his status when the truth breaks out, going to different heads of the Central govt. Prasad warns Bharadwaj of this before being arrested by Indrani. At last, Bose is ordered by Indrani to finish the mission. Bharadway fakes a heart attack and gets himself admitted into a hospital, but Bose has him arrested and kills him in self-defense. Finally, the movie ends with Bose moving on to his new mission.

== Cast ==
- Nandamuri Balakrishna as Bose / Godse
- Trisha Krishnan as Guggilla Mahalakshmi / Manjula
- Radhika Apte as Sarayu, so-called Godse's wife
- Prakash Raj as CM Bharadwaja
- Pradeep Rawat as Dhooli Krishna
- Brahmanandam as Krishna Satyannarayana
- Giri Babu as Balarama Krishnaiah
- Chandra Mohan as Bhoopathi
- Chalapathi Rao as Shankar Rao
- Kota Srinivasa Rao as Murugan
- Vijayakumar as Ex-CM Achutharamaiah
- Ali as Ambali
- M. S. Narayana was Gokineni Lingam / Goli Mama / Rahul
- Adithya Menon as Benerjee
- Suresh as CBI Chief Kesava Prasad
- Posani Krishna Murali as Police Inspector
- Ravi Prakash as Ravindra
- Ranganath as Doctor
- Sameer as Sameer
- Appaji Ambarisha Darbha as Doctor
- Mukhtar Khan as Bharadwaja's henchman
- Siva Balaji as Special Appearance
- Sravan as Sravan
- Prabhakar
- Shankar Melkote
- Lab Sarath
- Vizag Prasad
- Y. Kasi Viswanath
- Kadambari Kiran
- Sarika Ramahandra Rao
- Chitti
- Jayasudha as Malathi Devi
- Geetha as Bharati
- Indraja as CBI Deputy Chief Indrani
- Rajitha
- Chitralekha as Nandini
- Kotesh Manava as Doctor
- Archana as Special Appearance

== Soundtrack ==
Lion

Soundtrack album by Mani Sharma
- Released: 9 April 2015
- Recorded: 2015
- Genre: Soundtrack
- Length: 21:39
- Label: Lahari Music
- Producer: Mani Sharma

Mani Sharma chronology
Temper (BGM) (2015)	Lion (2015)	Tippu (2015)

Music was composed by Mani Sharma. Audio CD was released on Lahari Music Company. Audio was launched on 9 April 2015, held at Hyderabad Shilpakala Vedika by Andhra Pradesh Chief Minister Nara Chandrababu Naidu.

No.	Title	Lyrics	Singer(s)	Length
1.	"One & Only Lion"	Ramajogayya Sastry	Rahul Sipligunj, Geetha Madhuri, Pranavi	4:02
2.	"Akasam"	Bhaskarabhatla Ravi Kumar	Vijay Prakash, Srinivasa Sarma, Pranavi	4:31
3.	"Pilla"	Bhaskarabhatla Ravi Kumar	Simha, Sudhamayi	4:25
4.	"Aisa Ambani Pilla"	Sri Mani	Sweekar Agasthi, Uma Neha	4:18
5.	"Anaganaga"	Ramajogayya Sastry	Madhu Balakrishnan	4:23
Total length:				21:39

== Pre-release business ==
The film Andhra Pradesh rights sold for ₹20.83 crore (US$2.2 million) by various distributors. The film Karnataka rights sold for ₹2.5 crore (US$260,000) by Kranthi. The film had total prerelease up to ₹23.83 crore (US$2.5 million) in India. The film overseas rights acquired by SLV cinema for good price.

== Release ==
The film received U/A certificate from Censor Board due to violence in second half. The film released on 15 May 2015 in 900+ screens worldwide. The film Satellite Rights acquired by Gemini TV for ₹6 crore (US$620,000).

=== Critical reception ===
Idlebrain rated 3/5 and stated Interval episode is interesting. Second half has many episodes that exhilarate fans. Lion is a film that completely revolves around Balakrishna and depends on his performance. A good screenplay and right buildups (elevating emotions while building up to the key scenes) would have done a world of good to the cinema. On a whole, Lion is NBK's show! The Hindu stated Radhika wears a blank expression. There is another gem, a man confronts Balaiyya, “Natho matladataniki yentha dhairyam neeku” and the latter retorts “Neetho matladataniki dhairyam enduku...Iphone unte chaalu.” Lion takes plenty of retrograde steps. Mani Sarma too disappoints and the hero struggles with his steps. Time for Balakrishna to do some soul searching or his films would be just another addition to the number of films he has done.

=== Box office ===
The film opened good response in AP. The film collected ₹5.5 crore (US$570,000) (Share) at the Andhra Pradesh and Telangana (AP/T) box office on first day. The film collected ₹12.06 crore (US$1.3 million) (WW Share) in its extended first week end at the box office. The film collected a total ₹14.41 crore (US$1.5 million) (WW Share) in its first week and a gross of ₹24 crore (US$2.5 million)the box office.

By the end of its theatrical run, Lion collected a total gross of ₹28.95 crore worldwide with a share of ₹16.8 crore and was declared as a commercial failure as its theatricals were valued over ₹24 crore.
