= Trisha Krishnan =

Indian actress (born 1983)

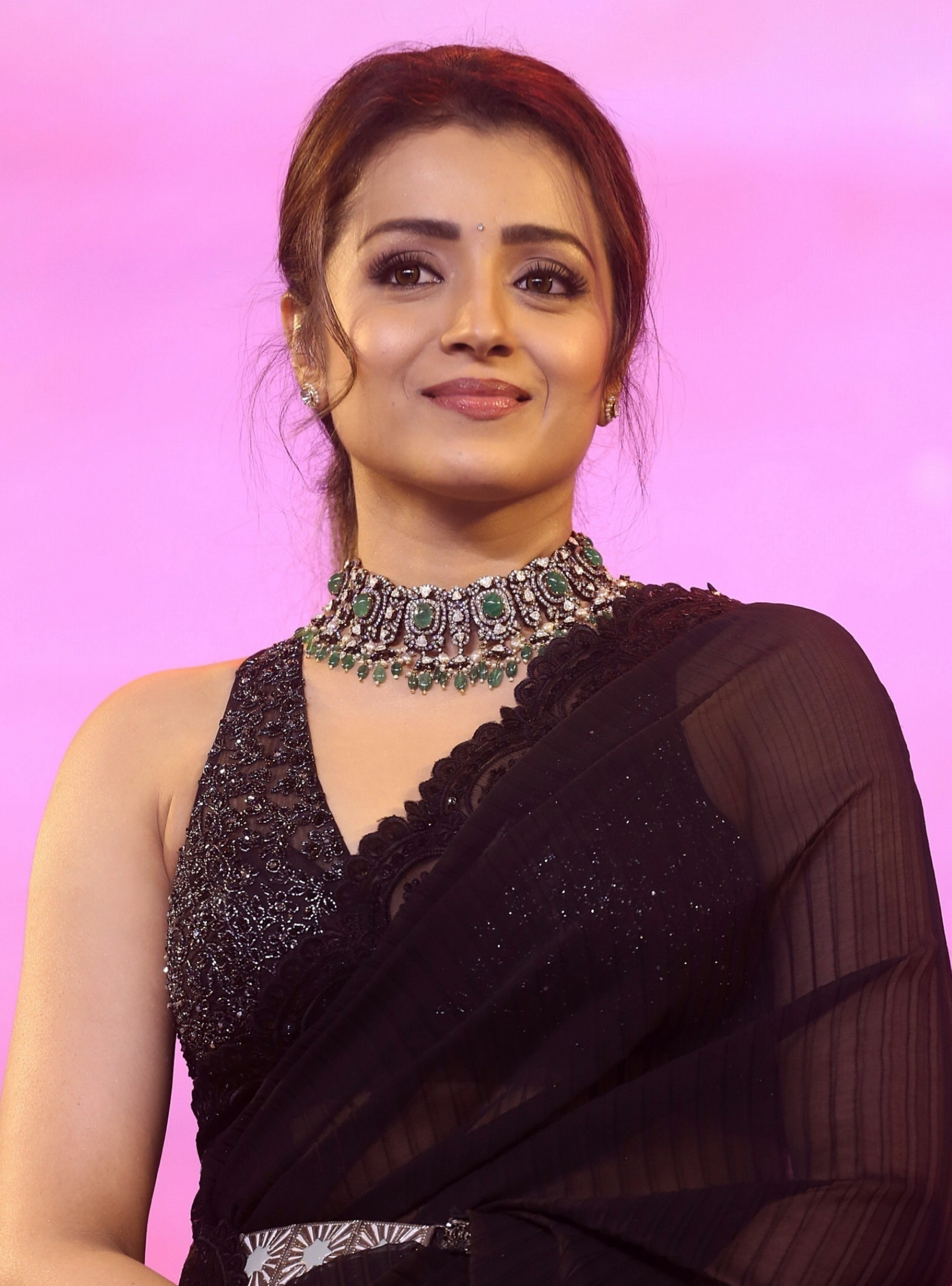
- Trisha in 2022
- Born: 4 May 1983 (age 43); Madras, Tamil Nadu, India
- Education: Ethiraj College for Women, Chennai (BBA)
- Occupation: Actress
- Years active: 1999–present
- Works: Full list
- Awards: Full list
- Honours: Kalaimaamani (2006)

Trisha Krishnan (born 4 May 1983) is an Indian actress known for her work primarily in Tamil and Telugu cinema. One of the highest-paid actresses in India, she has sustained a successful career as a leading actress for over two decades in Tamil cinema. Trisha gained prominence after winning the 1999 Miss Chennai pageant, which marked her entry into cinema. Often referred to as the "Queen of South India", she has received numerous accolades, including five Filmfare Awards South, a Tamil Nadu State Film Award and a Nandi Award.

After debuting with a minor supporting role in the Tamil romantic drama Jodi (1999), Trisha had her first lead role in the film Mounam Pesiyadhe (2002). She rose to fame starring in commercially and critically successful films Saamy (2003), Ghilli (2004), Aaru (2005), and Unakkum Enakkum (2006) in Tamil cinema, and Varsham (2004), Nuvvostanante Nenoddantana (2005), Athadu (2005), Aadavari Matalaku Ardhalu Verule (2007), and Krishna (2008), in Telugu cinema, winning three Filmfare Awards for Best Actress –Telugu, and a Nandi Award for Best actress –Telugu.

Trisha made her Hindi cinema debut by starring in the film Khatta Meetha (2010), her Kannada cinema debut with the film Power (2014), and her Malayalam cinema debut with the film Hey Jude (2018).

Her performances in the comedy drama Abhiyum Naanum (2008), the romantic drama Vinnaithaandi Varuvaayaa (2010), the action thrillers Yennai Arindhaal (2015), and Thoongaa Vanam (2015), the political thriller Kodi (2016), the romantic drama '96 (2018), the historical dramas Ponniyin Selvan: I (2022), and Ponniyin Selvan: II (2023) and the crime thriller series Brinda (2024), received critical acclaim. Her performances in Abhiyum Naanum, Kodi, and '96 earned her the Tamil Nadu State Film Award, Filmfare Critics Award for Best Actress –Tamil and the Filmfare Award for Best Actress –Tamil respectively. Her highest-grossing release to date is the action thriller film Leo (2023).

== Early life ==
Trisha Krishnan was born on 4 May 1983 to Krishnan and Uma in Madras, Tamil Nadu into a Tamil Palakkad Iyer family. She completed her schooling from Sacred Heart Matriculation School in Church Park, Chennai, and later pursued a Bachelor of Business Administration (BBA) course at Ethiraj College for Women, Chennai. She ventured into modelling and appeared in several print and television commercials. In 1999, she won the "Miss Salem" beauty pageant, and later the same year, the Miss Chennai contest. She also won the Miss India 2001 pageant's "Beautiful Smile" award.

Trisha had aspired to become a criminal psychologist initially, and resisted the thought of pursuing acting, as she wanted to complete her studies first. In 2000, she appeared in Falguni Pathak's music video Meri Chunar Udd Udd Jaye alongside Ayesha Takia. She was later approached for an acting role in the Tamil film Lesa Lesa (2003) by Indian film director Priyadarshan, which marked the beginning of her professional career as an actress. She had a tight shooting schedule while in college, making it difficult for her to continue her education. She compensated for this by attending summer classes.

== Film career ==
=== 1999–2003: Early career and success ===
Soon after her pageant success, Trisha began her acting career in a minor supporting role as Simran's friend in the romantic drama Jodi (1999). The first film she accepted was the Priyadarshan directed Lesa Lesa, with the promotional posters for the film, also creating an offer to star in the A. R. Rahman musical hit, Enakku 20 Unakku 18 (2003). However, both the projects' releases were severely delayed, and her first release was Ameer's Mounam Pesiyadhe (2002) opposite Suriya, the film became a moderate success at the box office and managed to gain credentials for Trisha, with critics claiming that she was "undoubtedly a refreshing new find, with sparkling eyes and appealing demeanour", also going onto praise the dubbing artiste, Savitha Reddy, who has since regularly dubbed for Trisha. Manasellam (2003), her second project, saw her play a cancer patient, but the film went unnoticed upon its March release.

Her subsequent release was the Hari-directed action film, Saamy (2003) with Vikram. She played a soft-spoken college-going Brahmin girl and received positive reviews for her performance, with Sify's reviewer citing that she was "appealingly sensual" and looked "glamorous", and another critic writing that she looked "very pretty" and suited the role. The masala flick became the biggest blockbuster of the year, and landed Trisha new offers, including several high-budget productions. Lesa Lesa, which was supposed to be her debut, released later the same month in May 2003. The romantic musical, based on the 1998 Malayalam film Summer in Bethlehem, fetched generally positive reviews. After Lesa Lesa, she appeared in Alai (2003). Her last release of the year was Enakku 20 Unakku 18 (2003).

=== 2004–2008: Stardom in Telugu and Tamil cinema ===
In 2004, she debuted in Telugu cinema with M. S. Raju-produced romantic action film Varsham, which turned her into an overnight sensation. Critics lauded her performance as Sailaja, a middle-class girl who becomes a film star on her father's insistence; Jeevi from Idlebrain stated that she was "beautiful" and a "big plus to the film", labelling her performance as "natural", while Sify noted that she had "transformed herself into a fine actress with immense screen presence". The film was a major commercial success, running in theatres for over 175 days and becoming one of the highest-grossing films of the year, and was declared a "sensational hit". For her role in Varsham, Trisha won her first Filmfare Awards for Best Actress – Telugu award, as well as the Santosham Award for Best Actress.

Later in 2004, she acted as the female lead opposite Vijay in the action comedy film Ghilli. She played the character of Dhanalakshmi, a helpless girl who is protected from a thug by a Kabaddi player. Trisha's portrayal of Dhanalakshmi is considered one of her memorable performances and a standout role in her career, and the film eventually emerged as the highest-grossing Tamil film of the year, celebrating a 175-day run, and was Trisha's biggest commercial success at the time. She next appeared in a small role in Mani Ratnam's political drama Aayutha Ezhuthu (2004), starring as part of an ensemble cast that included Siddharth, Madhavan and Suriya, despite favourable reviews, the film had an average box office performance.

In the following two years, Trisha had 12 releases overall, where she featured as the female lead. She starred as the leading actress in two action commercial flicks Thirupaachi (2005) and Aaru (2005), directed by Perarasu and Hari respectively. Of these, Thirupaachi became a major commercial success. In her second Telugu project, the romantic drama Nuvvostanante Nenoddantana (2005), she starred alongside Siddharth. The film, being Prabhu Deva's directorial debut, opened to rave reviews, with Trisha receiving praise for her portrayal as the village girl Siri. This performance earned her several Best Actress awards, including her second consecutive Filmfare Awards for Best Actress – Telugu and her first Nandi Award for Best Actress. Idlebrain noted that she was "just great. Her tender looks, appearance and Telugu traditional costumes make her a treat to watch", further labelling her expressions and "naughty antics" as excellent, while Sify wrote of Trisha that she was "amazing as Siri [...] It is her career-best performance and she has excelled throughout." The film eventually won eight Filmfare Awards South, the most ever by any Telugu film, while also emerging as a major commercial success at the box office.

Continuing her string of releases in 2005, she then starred alongside Mahesh Babu in the action thriller Athadu, which proved to be a critical and commercial success, and her performance as Poori earned her third nomination for the Filmfare Award for Best Actress – Telugu. Trisha later went on to reprise the role in its Tamil remake, Nandhu, as well. Her subsequent releases, N Lingusamy's political action film Ji (2005) starred opposite Ajith Kumar was commercially unsuccessful and Aathi (2006), strarred opposite Vijay was an average grosser.

Her next role in Pournami (2006), she played the role of Pournami, a young woman destined to perform a sacred dance ritual was directed by Prabhu Deva, saw her third-consecutive starring role in an M. S. Raju production. Trisha was featured in the titular role alongside an ensemble cast. She had previously earned Raju's praise after her work in the successful Varsham and Nuvvostanante Nenoddantana, with him stating that she was "one of the most talented and beautiful actresses I have ever worked with", going on to draw comparisons to the works of Savitri, Nargis and Sophia Loren.

Her sole Tamil release of 2006, Unakkum Enakkum, was a remake of Nuvvostanante Nenoddantana. This film, where she acted opposite Jayam Ravi, did well at the box office. She also starred in the Telugu film Stalin (2006) with Chiranjeevi, directed by A.R. Murugadoss achieved significant success following which her Telugu film Sainikudu (2006) with Mahesh Babu was released.

Her next release was Aadavari Matalaku Ardhalu Verule (2007), in which she played the female lead opposite Venkatesh, portraying a team leader in a software firm. The film, Selvaraghavan's first Telugu venture, received positive reviews and became a critical and commercial success. Trisha received her third Filmfare Award for Best Actress – Telugu for her performance in this film. She next starred in Kireedam (2007) alongside Ajith Kumar.

Her first 2008 release, Telugu film Krishna with Ravi Teja became a blockbuster. Tamil film, Bheema did not do well became average grosser at the box office, whereas Kuruvi was a sleeper hit after completion of 150 day theatrical run at the box office. Her following 2008 release Bujjigadu, directed by Puri Jagannadh and starring her alongside Prabhas, had a decent run.

Trisha received praise for her performance in her next release, Radhamohan's Abhiyum Naanum (2008). She played the role of Abhi, an independent young woman who has a close-knit bond with her father. The story revolves around a father-daughter relationship. Trisha's performance was widely praised for its subtlety and emotional depth, and earned her the Tamil Nadu State Film Award and a Filmfare nomination for Best Actress. Following this, she starred in the Telugu film King (2008) opposite Nagarjuna, which emerged as a blockbuster at the box office. She received nominations for the Filmfare Award for Best Actress – Telugu and Filmfare Award for Best Actress – Tamil for her performances in Krishna and Abhiyum Naanum respectively.

=== 2009–2017: Further success ===
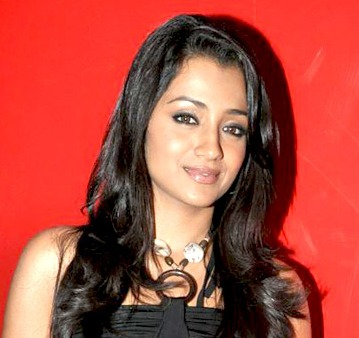
Trisha in 2010

Her 2009 films Sarvam with Arya and Sankham opposite Gopichand did not do well and became just average grossers. Trisha had a major role, starring as a Syrian Christian Malayali girl Jessie, in Gautham Vasudev Menon's 2010 Tamil romantic drama Vinnaithaandi Varuvaayaa, which was a major commercial success at the box office. The film centres around the complicated relationship between a Syrian Christian Malayali girl and a Tamil Hindu assistant director, who falls in love with her, only to be met by her indifference and reluctance as they belong to different religions and her strict conservative family will never consent to their marriage. Her performance was acclaimed by critics, earning her the Vijay Award for Favourite Heroine, in addition to her second nomination for the Filmfare Award for Best Actress – Tamil. Pavithra Srinivasan of Rediff commented, "Trisha is a revelation. Shorn of her filmi make-up, she dazzles in Nalini Sriram's simple costumes." Sify remarked, "Trisha looks good and delivers her career-best performance in a knock-out role." Namo Venkatesa was her sole Telugu release in 2010. In the same year, she starred in Manmadhan Ambu with Kamal Haasan and R. Madhavan.

She made her debut in Hindi cinema with Priyadarshan's political comedy film Khatta Meetha (2010). Trisha portrayed a strong municipal commissioner who assists the protagonist, played by Akshay Kumar in his endeavours. Upon release, the film received mixed reviews from critics and Box Office India declared it an average performer at the box office.

Trisha was part of two commercially successful ventures in 2011, Theenmaar the female lead opposite Pawan Kalyan in Telugu and Venkat Prabhu's Mankatha in Tamil. The latter was the highest-grossing Tamil film of the year.

In 2012, she had two Telugu releases Bodyguard, a remake of the same-titled Malayalam film, where she was paired with Daggubati Venkatesh for the third time, and Dammu opposite N. T. Rama Rao Jr.

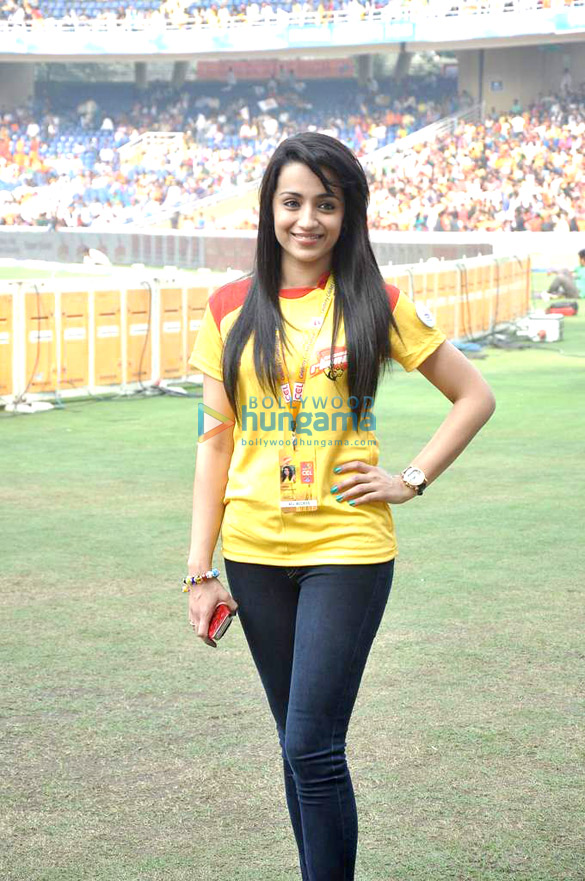
Trisha in 2014

This was followed by two Tamil releases in 2013 Samar opposite Vishal, Trisha played as a bold and resourceful woman balancing vulnerability and resilience while playing an essential role in the action and suspense of the film, and the comedy-drama Endrendrum Punnagai alongside Jiiva. Her performance in the latter film earned Trisha her third nomination for the Filmfare Award for Best Actress – Tamil.

She signed on two "women-centric" bilingual projects featuring female lead casts, titled Rambha Urvasi Menaka and Kannaale Kannan. Although both films were commenced, they were stalled in 2013.

She debuted in Kannada cinema with the action comedy film Power in 2014 opposite Puneeth Rajkumar, was a commercial success.

Trisha's releases in 2015 included Yennai Arindhaal opposite Ajith Kumar, directed by Gautham Vasudev Menon, she played the role of a bharatanatyam dance teacher and a single mother, raising her young daughter. Her performance was well received by the audience and the film was a commercial success. Her Telugu film Lion was released opposite Nandamuri Balakrishna and Bhooloham with Jayam Ravi in Tamil.

In the action thriller film Thoonga Vanam (2015) she played the role of an NCB (Narcotics Control Bureau) agent, opposite Kamal Haasan.

She also acted in the comedy horror film Aranmanai 2 (2016) was a commercial success.

In 2016, she starred in the political drama Kodi portrayed ruthless politician with negative shades who is both love interest and political rival opposite Dhanush, which proved to be a critical and commercial success, earning her the Filmfare Critics Award for Best Actress – Tamil, in addition to her fourth nomination for the Filmfare Award for Best Actress – Tamil.

=== 2018–present: Critical acclaim and continued career ===
In 2018, she acted in the Malayalam romantic comedy film Hey Jude with Nivin Pauly making her Malayalam debut. She played a character portrayed as a singer also a victim of bipolar disorder.

Following this, she played a leading role in the Tamil romantic drama '96 opposite Vijay Sethupathi and received widespread critical acclaim. Janani K. of India Today hailed her performance as her career-best. She won her first Filmfare Award for Best Actress – Tamil, and other Best Actress awards at the SIIMA Awards, the Edison Awards, the Norway Tamil Film Festival Awards, and the Ananda Vikatan Cinema Awards.

She then starred in a brief role in Petta (2019), alongside superstar Rajinikanth.

In 2020, she reprised her role as Jessie from Vinnaithaandi Varuvaayaa in the short film Karthik Dial Seytha Yenn (2020) presenting fresh narrative for the character.

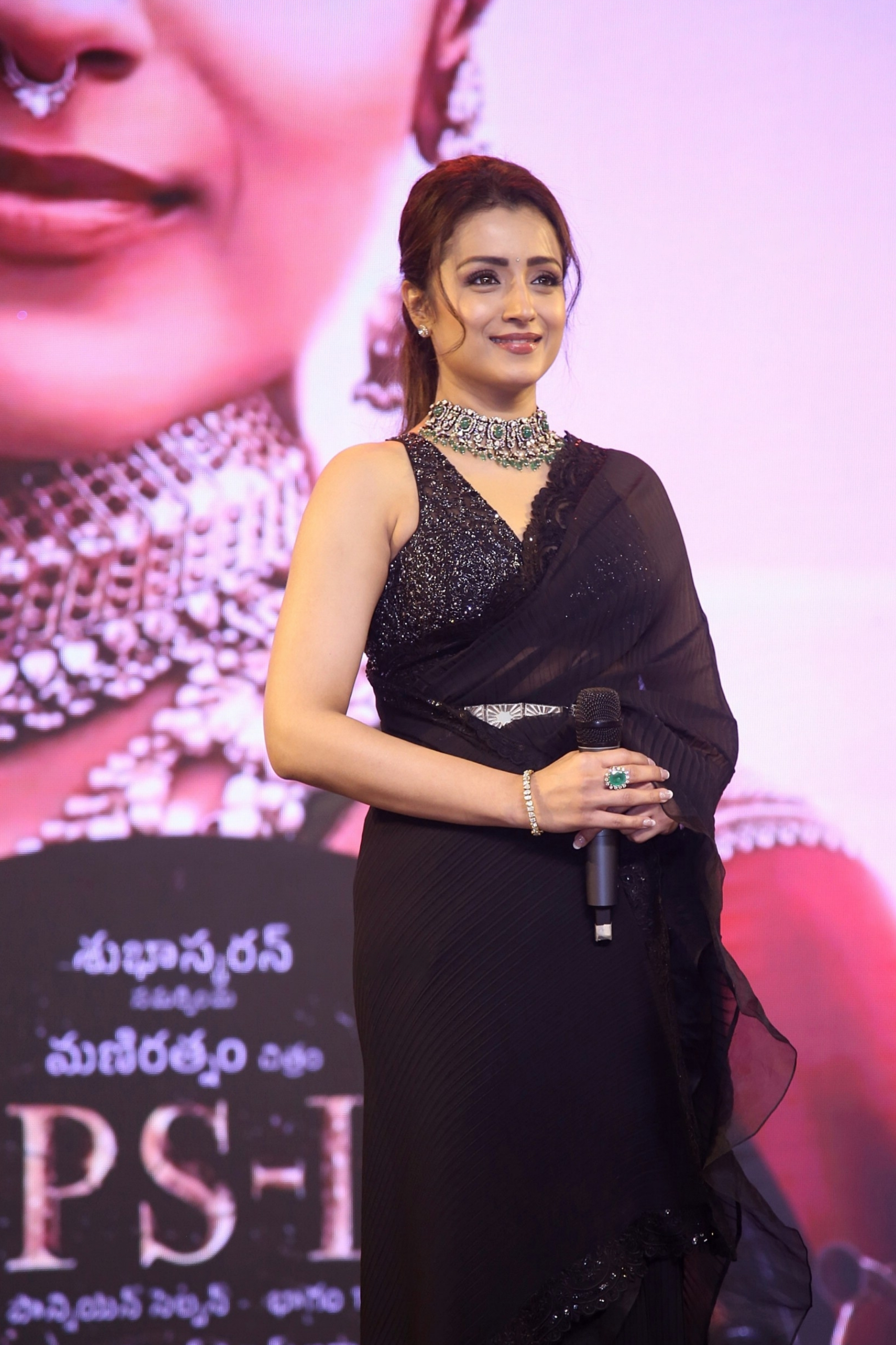
Trisha in 2022

This was followed by her 60th film appearance with a starring role in Paramapadham Vilayattu (2021) a political thriller where Trisha played a key character, and her performance was praised for its intensity.

She was next seen in Mani Ratnam's historical drama Ponniyin Selvan: I (2022), in the role of the Chola princess, Kundavai, her performance received critical acclaim and she was nominated for Filmfare Award for Best Actress – Tamil. Her next appearance was in Tamil action thriller movie Raangi (2022) a journalist who becomes entangled with a terrorist organisation.

Her first release of 2023 was the sequel Ponniyin Selvan: II, where she reprised her role as Kundavai, and she was nominated for Filmfare Award for Best Actress – Tamil. That year, she also starred in the film The Road (2023), and the highly anticipated film Leo (2023), which become one of the highest-grossing South Indian films of 2023.

In 2024, Ghilli was re-released for its 20th anniversary and went on to become one of the highest-grossing Indian film re-releases. In August, her web series Brinda premiered on Sony LIV, where she excelled in her role as a police officer. She also made a special appearance in the film The Greatest of All Time, captivating audiences with her performance in the dance number "Matta".

In her first film of 2025, the action thriller film Identity, she played a news presenter and murder witness who suffered from face-blindness after a traumatic event alongside Tovino Thomas. Trisha then reunited with Ajith Kumar for two films, Vidaamuyarchi and Good Bad Ugly, she played a character in Vidaamuyarchi, where the central theme is marriage, highlighting love, commitment, and the challenges the couple faces together. Her next appearance was in the action comedy film Good Bad Ugly. In her fourth film of the year, anticipated gangster drama Thug Life (2025), she portrayed the character Indhrani, critics highlighted her character was underwritten and had a limited narrative significance. It underperformed at the box office.

== Personal life ==
Trisha resides in Chennai with her mother and grandmother. Trisha's father died in October 2012. She can speak Tamil, English, Hindi and French. She follows a vegetarian diet. Her mother, Uma Krishnan, accompanies Trisha on film shoots, events, and functions, and they have appeared together in a commercial advertisement. Uma had been offered various roles by several Tamil film makers and actors including Kamal Haasan, but turned them down as she wanted to concentrate on Trisha's career.

About her relationship with her mother, Trisha remarked: "She has been the pillar of my strength and has stood by me like a rock through thick and thin. Everyone in the industry and my friends know how close I'm to my mom."

In 2015, she was engaged to entrepreneur Varun Manian but the engagement was called off. She was in a relationship with Rana Daggubati during the late 2010s after being friends for a decade.

== Other work and media image ==
Trisha is considered among the most popular actors of Tamil and Telugu cinema. She is one of the highest paid actresses in South Indian cinema, according to various media reports. Trisha received the Kalaimamani award, for her "Contribution to Tamil Cinema", in 2006.

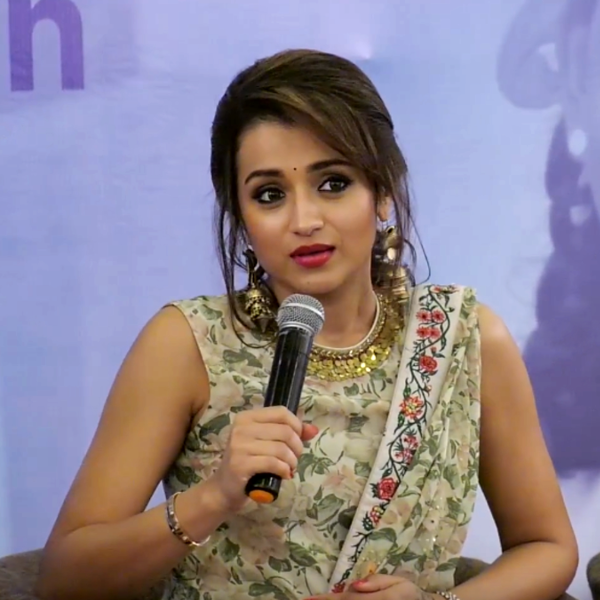
Trisha at UNICEF World Children's Day Press Meet

An ardent animal lover, Trisha has been the Goodwill Ambassador of PETA. In 2010, Trisha collaborated with People for the Ethical Treatment of Animals (PETA) in issuing a public appeal to domesticate stray dogs rather than craving for pedigreed foreign breeds. She was also the Goodwill Ambassador for the "Angel for Animals" campaign organised by PETA in 2010, encouraging people to adopt homeless dogs. PETA praised Trisha for her work, and sent her an appreciation letter highlighting her animal rescue work and efforts to encourage people to adopt Indian community dogs.

In 2017, Trisha was the first actor from South India to be conferred with the UNICEF celebrity advocate status. Subsequently, she will voice the rights of children including adolescents and young people.

The Indian Express noted Trisha to be "a top actor" in the South Indian film industry. Rediff.com termed her the "biggest sensation" in South India. Filmfare noted, "Trisha has remained popular with audiences by regularly playing endearing characters and appearing in blockbuster films." They further praised her "longevity" in the industry. Gautam Sunder noted her "ubiquitous popularity", saying: "She has sustained two decades in films as a leading actor with proven mettle and box-office success." Aditya Shrikrishna of Verve termed Trisha the "legacy maker" and noted, "Trisha has made her a popular choice for author-backed roles." Trisha continues to be active in the film industry, and her enduring appeal and versatility have solidified her status as a significant figure in Indian cinema.

Trisha replaced Rani Mukerji as the brand ambassador of Fanta India. She was the brand ambassador of Scooty Pep+, for which she has replaced Preity Zinta. She was also the brand ambassador for Vivel Di Wills, a product by ITC Limited. In 2011, she replaced Asin in the Fairever fairness cream commercial. Trisha is also a prominent celebrity endorser for other brands and products including Joy Alukkas, Volini, and Urbanrise.

== Sources ==
- "Trisha's journey: From Miss Madras to Khatta Meetha". Sify. 2010. Archived from the original on 15 March 2017. Alt URL
