= Kodi (film) =

2016 Indian film by R. S. Durai Senthilkumar

- Film poster
- Directed by: R. S. Durai Senthilkumar
- Written by: Ve. Ki. Amirtharaj (dialogues)
- Screenplay by: R. S. Durai Senthilkumar
- Story by: R. S. Durai Senthilkumar
- Produced by: Vetrimaaran; P. Madan (Presenter)
- Starring: Dhanush; Trisha Krishnan; Anupama Parameswaran
- Cinematography: S. Venkatesh
- Edited by: Prakash Mabbu
- Music by: Santhosh Narayanan
- Production company: Grass Root Film Company
- Distributed by: Escape Artists Motion Pictures
- Release date: 28 October 2016
- Country: India
- Language: Tamil

Kodi (/koʊdi/ transl. Flag (Note: Also the title character.)) is a 2016 Indian Tamil-language political action drama film directed by R. S. Durai Senthilkumar and produced by Vetrimaaran via Grass Root Film Company. The film stars Dhanush, Trisha Krishnan and Anupama Parameswaran (in her Tamil film debut). Saranya Ponvannan, S. A. Chandrasekhar, Kaali Venkat, Namo Narayana and G. Marimuthu play supporting roles. In the film, a politician has to compete against his lover, and his apolitical twin brother is also dragged into the conflict.

The film, announced untitled in August 2015, is the first to feature Dhanush in a dual role, and the title was announced that December. Principal photography began in January 2016 and wrapped that March. The film's music was composed by Santhosh Narayanan, the cinematography was handled by Venkatesh S, and editing by Prakash Mabbu.

Kodi was released on 28 October 2016, during the week of Diwali. It received five nominations in the Tamil branch at the 64th Filmfare Awards South, including Best Actor (Dhanush), Best Actress (Trisha) and Best Supporting Actress (Anupama and Saranya). Trisha won the Filmfare Critics Award for Best Actress – Tamil. The film was remade in Kannada as Dhwaja (2018).

== Plot ==
Kodi and Anbu are twin brothers. Politics has been a part of Kodi's life ever since his birth in Pollachi. Kodi's mute father Murugan was a low-rung Democratic party worker and led his twins to be named by their party president. He brings Kodi into the world of politics before self-immolating in protest against a factory whose toxic mercury waste had ruined lives in the locality in 1995. Anbu, an engineering college professor, is apolitical. Kodi grows up being political with his friend Bhagat Singh and is in a relationship with Rudra, who, like Kodi, has been a politician all her life, but with the opposing Republican party currently in power. Kodi, despite opposition from ex-minister Marimuthu, becomes District Youth Wing Organizer for the party's Coimbatore district due to his popularity and work.

While fighting members of the opposition on the street one day, Kodi breaks a trolley of eggs that Malathi is trying to sell to a shopkeeper. She chases after him to no avail, before leaving for an appointment at a college cafeteria where she has an interview for a contract to sell eggs. She comes across Anbu, mistaking him for Kodi, before knowing about his twin brother. Anbu and Malathi fall in love. Later, Malathi tells him about the factories near her village dumping mercury waste where people live, negatively impacting the villagers' lives. Anbu is worried and tells Kodi.

Meanwhile, Rudra is frustrated about being stereotyped as lower down in her party because she is a woman and poor. One night, she overhears that Arivazhagan, the State education minister from Coimbatore, actually dropped out of school and falsified his election nominations. She tips this information off to the Democratic party, who file a suit against Arivazhagan. In a few months, Arivazhagan loses the case and is disqualified from his position as an MLA. The by-elections are announced for the Pollachi constituency. Rudra befriends the ex-minister, becomes the interim District Secretary, and then kicks him out.

The Democratic party is excited about the by-elections, despite the notion that the then-incumbent state ruling party has always won by-elections for the last 25 years, regardless of who rules. Kodi meets his Party Supremo, who tells him that they will discuss the opposition's scandal after the by-elections. Meanwhile, Anbu provides the documents about the mercury waste to Kodi, who then finds out that his ex-minister and party senior Marimuthu and the entire Democratic party top brass are responsible for what happened to the villagers affected by the factory, as they were the ruling party at the time. Feeling betrayed, he shares this with Rudra in confidence, who brings it up at her next public speech.

Enraged and embarrassed, the Democratic leader plots to keep Kodi silent by announcing him as their by-election candidate – now running right against Rudra. When the Republican party finds out about Kodi and Rudra's relationship, they start pressuring her to give up her candidacy. Photos of Rudra and Kodi's vacations leak online, and the campaign is stalled. The Chief Minister tells Rudra to slide the campaign in her favour within a day, or he will change the candidate. A depressed Rudra asks Kodi to meet her in the woods to talk, and she tells him about the ex-minister standing in her way to success before she eliminated him. They get ambushed by goons that Arivazhagan sent to kill Rudra, but Kodi beats them up. Rudra suddenly backstabs Kodi, apologises, and tells him that he was her last obstacle. Kodi is broken by betrayal but decides to die for her, and the by-elections are cancelled for three months due to the candidate's death.

Anbu goes to quarrel with Kodi's party members, and he is kicked out. Rudra meets Kodi's family and tells them she can convince her party to give Anbu the candidacy for MLA. Though Kodi's mother angrily declines it, Anbu accepts it and wins the by-election unopposed. Rudra is made the full-time District Secretary and an MP of Rajya Sabha as a bonus. Anbu, as MLA, comes to congratulate her; his look and body language are now completely changed to match his brother Kodi's, much to Rudra's dismay. Anbu lets her know that he is very invested and interested in his brother's murder as well as the mercury waste issue.

Kotraivel, a member of the Democratic party, finds a forest camera hidden in the woods that recorded Rudra killing Kodi. He threatens Rudra with this and tells her to fix the mercury waste issue. Rudra uses Crime Branch Inspector V. Ravichandran as a pawn to destroy the evidence and kill Kotraivel, but is still afraid of Anbu finding out about everything, as he is taking the documents about the factory to the court.

In an attempt to stop him, Rudra kidnaps his mother, and Bhagat and tells Anbu to come to the factory. Anbu realises that Rudra killed Kodi and gets into a fight with Rudra's goons, Kotraivel, and Marimuthu, resulting in Anbu coming on top. He had come to the factory to kill Rudra, but his mother tells him that it is not worth it and to spare her. After they leave, Bhagat impales Rudra with an iron rod, saying he wished for Rudra and Kodi to live happily, but she ruined it, and leaves her for dead.

== Cast ==
- Dhanush in a dual role as Kodi and Anbu
- Trisha Krishnan as Rudra
- Anupama Parameswaran as Malathi
- Saranya Ponvannan as Kodi and Anbu's mother
- Kaali Venkat as Bhagat Singh
- S. A. Chandrasekhar as Thalaivar, President of Opposition party
- Vijayakumar as the Chief Minister of Tamil Nadu
- Sachu as Malathi's grandmother
- Namo Narayana as MLA Arivazhagan
- Karunas as Murugan, Kodi and Anbu's father
- G. Marimuthu as Marimuthu
- Rajasimman as Kotraivel
- Anil Murali as V. Ravichandran
- Raj Kapoor as Finance Minister of state and second-in-command of the ruling party
- Sruthi Shanmuga Priya as Malathi's sister
- Mohana as News Reporter
- Swaminathan as College Principal
- Singamuthu as Ruling Party MLA from Coimbatore
- Badava Gopi
- Sonia
- Baba Bhaskar in a special appearance in the song "Vettu Pottu"

== Production ==
In August 2015, it was announced that Dhanush would act in R. S. Durai Senthilkumar's next film, after he finished his ongoing commitments. Dhanush would appear in dual roles for the first time in his career. Vidya Balan was approached for the female lead, but was not willing to do a Tamil film due to date issues. Trisha was eventually signed on, pairing with Dhanush for the first time, and Shamili was signed on to portray the second leading female role. Shamili, after filming some scenes however, opted out due to work conflicts, before Anupama Parameswaran was confirmed as her replacement. The film is Anupama's Tamil debut, and the makers cast her after being impressed with her performance in the Malayalam film Premam (2015). The title Kodi was announced in December 2015. Initially scheduled to start filming in early December 2015, plans were delayed as a result of the 2015 South India floods and the schedule was delayed by two weeks. Subsequently, the team held an official launch on 11 December 2015. Principal photography began on 5 January 2016, and wrapped in early March.

== Soundtrack ==
The soundtrack album for Kodi is composed by Santhosh Narayanan. The audio rights were acquired by Sony Music India. The audio launch was held on 5 October 2016.

Sify gave a rating of 3 stars out of 5 and stated, "The ear-pleasing numbers make this a solid album". Karthik of Milliblog wrote, "The soundtrack’s highlight is Ei suzhali, a lilting, quirky ballad with a retro-style orchestration, wonderfully sung by Vijaynarain. But, overall, this Kodi doesn’t seem to be flying all that high".

Track listing
No.	Title	Lyrics	Singer(s)	Length
1.	"Kodi Parakkudha"	Dhanush, Arunraja Kamaraj	Dhanush, Arunraja Kamaraj	03:24
2.	"Ei Suzhali"	Vivek	Vijaynarain	03:37
3.	"Ariraro"	Vivek	K. S. Chithra	03:48
4.	"Sirukki Vaasam"	Vivek	Anand Aravindakshan, Shweta Mohan	04:35
5.	"Vettu Pottu"	Vivek	Shankar Mahadevan	03:01
Total length:				18:25

== Release ==
Kodi was released on 28 October 2016, during the week of Diwali. It was dubbed in Telugu as Dharmayogi, which released one day after the Tamil version. The television premiere of Kodi was held on 14 January 2017 on Sun TV.

=== Critical reception ===
Srinivasa Ramanujan of The Hindu wrote, "Director Durai Senthilkumar deserves credit for an engaging plot that includes a pre-interval block that jolts you. After all, when was the last time a commercial political film worked to a large extent without the existence of a dominating male villain?" Manathi Mannath of The New Indian Express concluded "Kodi worth a watch for its universal sensibility". M Suganth of The Times of India gave Kodi 4 stars out of 5 and stated, "Kodi shows how a good actor can make a film rise above its genre. Dhanush's performance here, subtly delineating the two roles, is a delight to watch. He shines in the mass hero moments as well as the dramatic ones". Sify stated that Kodi was "deliciously dramatic, and packed with sinister twists and turns with superb performances and solid writing" and rated 4 out of 5. Anupama Subramanian of Deccan Chronicle gave 3 out of 5 concluding "Overall, 'Kodi' with some fine performances, especially Dhanush's, and neat screenplay is an engaging political drama." Manoj Kumar R of The Indian Express gave 3 stars, stating Kodi "seems to be everything the Tamil audience wants for this festive season". Sreedhar Pillai, writing for Firstpost, stated, "Kodi is a well written and packaged commercial entertainer that delivers the goods".

=== Box office ===
The film collected ₹15 crore (US$1.6 million) in Tamil Nadu in two days.

== Accolades ==
Event	Category	Outcome	Recipient	Ref.
64th Filmfare Awards South	Best Actor – Tamil	Nominated	Dhanush	
64th Filmfare Awards South	Best Actress – Tamil	Nominated	Trisha	
64th Filmfare Awards South	Best Supporting Actress – Tamil	Nominated	Anupama Parameswaran	
64th Filmfare Awards South	Best Supporting Actress – Tamil	Nominated	Saranya Ponvannan	
64th Filmfare Awards South	Best Lyricist – Tamil	Nominated	Vivek (for "En Suzhali")	
64th Filmfare Awards South	Critics Best Actress – Tamil	Won	Trisha	
