= Filmfare Critics Award for Best Actress – Tamil =

Indian annual film award

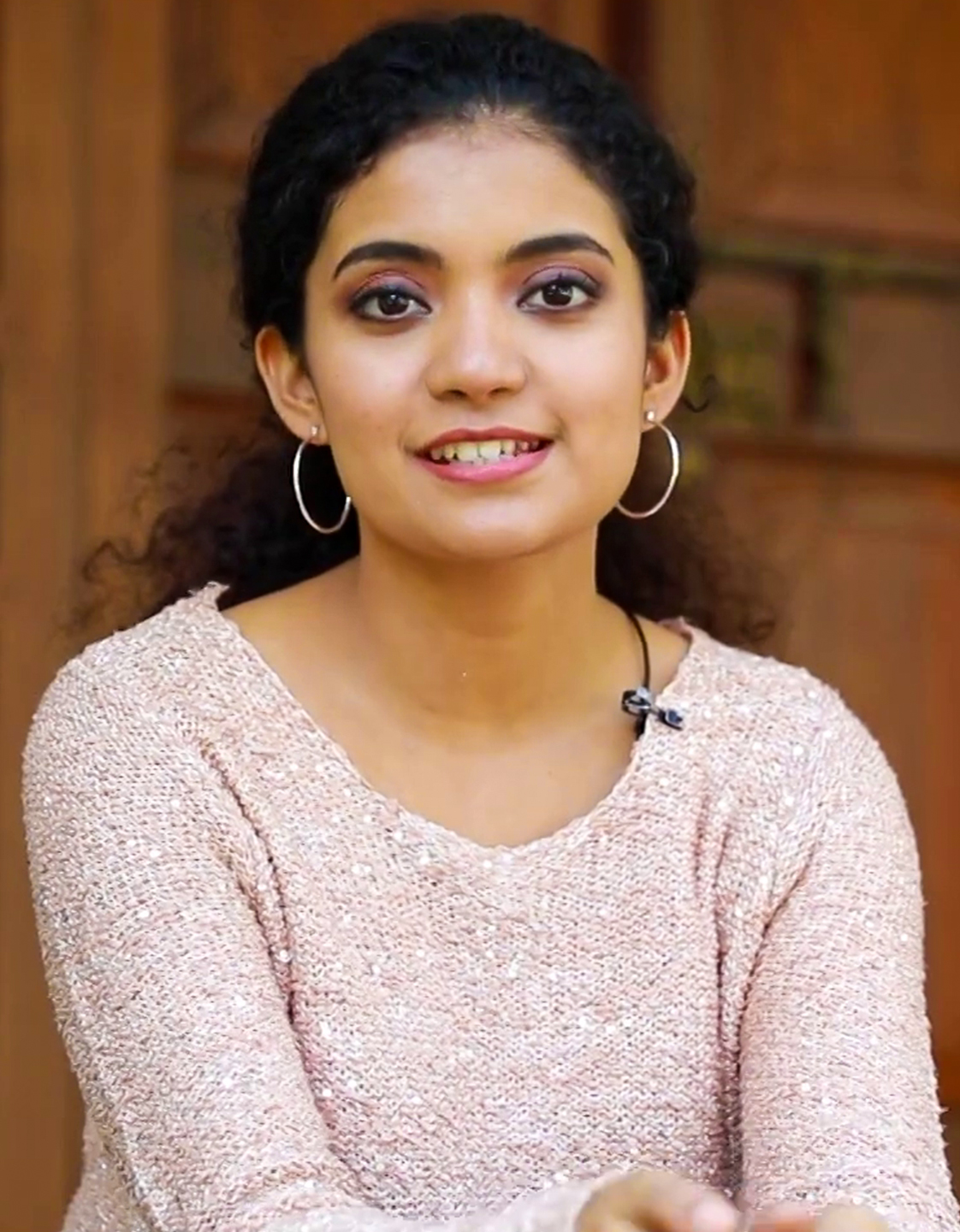
- The 2024 recipient: Anna Ben
- Awarded for: Best performance by an actress in Tamil films
- Country: India
- Presented by: Filmfare
- First award: 2015
- Currently held by: Anna Ben for Kottukkaali (2024)

The Filmfare Critics Award for Best Actress – Tamil is given by Filmfare as part of its annual Filmfare Awards South for Tamil films. The award is given by the chosen jury of critics assigned.

Two consecutive winners of the award, Aparna Balamurali and Nithya Menen, also won the National Film Award for Best Actress for their performances while the first recipient, Jyothika, also won the Tamil Nadu State Film Award for Best Actress.

== Superlatives ==
=== Most Wins ===
- 2 wins: Aishwarya Rajesh

== Winners ==
Year	Actress	Role	Film	Ref.
2015	Jyothika	Vasanthi Tamizhselvan	36 Vayadhinile	
2016	Trisha	Rudra	Kodi	
2017	Aditi Balan	Aruvi	Aruvi	
2018	Aishwarya Rajesh	Kousalya Murugesan	Kanaa	
2019	AWARDS FUNCTION WAS SUSPENDED DUE TO COVID-19 PANDEMIC			
2020–2021	Aparna Balamurali	Sundari Nedumaaran	Soorarai Pottru	
2022	Nithya Menen	Shobana	Thiruchitrambalam	
2023	Aishwarya Rajesh	Farhana / Isha	Farhana	
2023	Aparna Das	Sindhu	Dada	
2024	Anna Ben	Meena	Kottukkaali	

== See also ==
- Filmfare Critics Award for Best Actor – Tamil
