= Dhanraj =

Dhanaraj may refer to:

== People ==
- Dhanraj (actor), Telugu actor and comedian
- Dhanraj Bhagat (1917–1988), Indian sculptor
- Dhanraj Chandrasekaran, Indian bishop
- Dhanraj Giri (1811–1901), Indian abbot of Kailash Ashram
- Dhanraj Mahale, Indian politician
- Dhanraj Pillay (born 1968), Indian field hockey player
- Dhanraj Singh (politician) (1944–?), Indian politician
- Dhanraj Singh (boxer) (born 1947), Guyanese boxer
- Master Dhanraj, Indian musician and multi-instrumentalist
- Dharmakkan Dhanaraj (1950–2017), Indian scholar
- John Dhanraj, Indian television host
- Rajindra Dhanraj (born 1969), Trinidadian cricket player
- Sarit Dhanaraj (1908–1963), Thai military officer and prime minister
- Vaishnavi Dhanraj (born 1988), Indian actress

== Other ==
- Dhanraj Mahal, a residence in Mumbai, India
- Dhanraj Tamang, a 1978 Indian Bengali-language film

== See also ==
- Radhakrishnan Dhanarajan (1980–2019), Indian football player
