= List of songs recorded by Ilaiyaraaja =

This page provides the list of songs sung by Ilaiyaraaja. He has sung over 380 songs of his own tunes as well as done playback singing for other music directors.

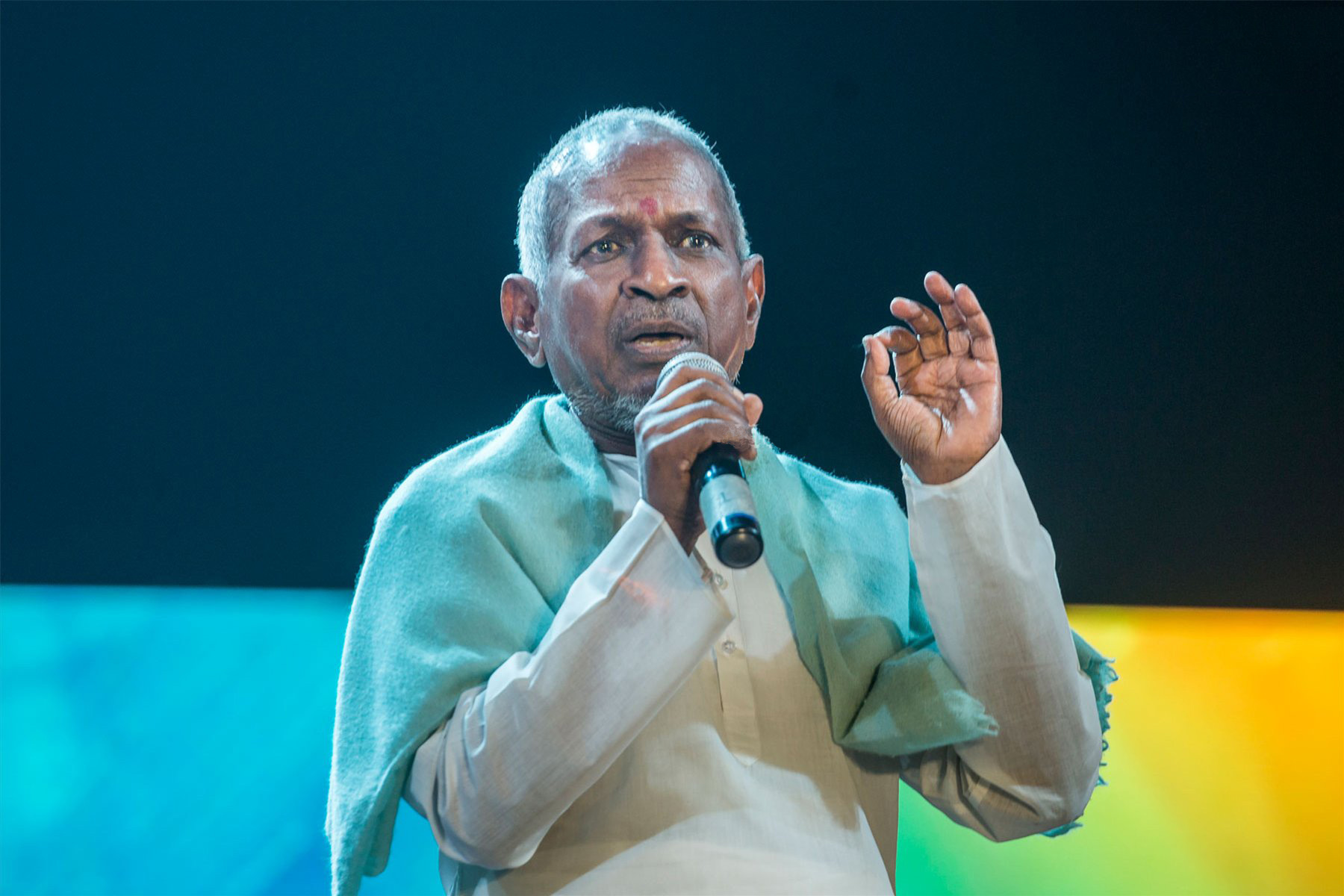

== Film songs ==
=== 1977 ===
Film	Song	Language	Composer	Ref
16 Vayadhinile	"Solam Vidhaikkaiyile"	Tamil	Ilaiyaraaja	
Odi Vilaiyaadu Thaatha	"Oru Kodi Poyyai"	Tamil	Ilaiyaraaja	

=== 1978 ===
Film	Song	Language	Composer	Ref
Kannan Oru Kai Kuzhandhai	"Vayitril Sumandhaval"	Tamil	Ilaiyaraaja	
Kizhakke Pogum Rail	"Yedho Paattu Yedho Raagam"	Tamil	Ilaiyaraaja	
Mullum Malarum	"Maan Iname Mullai Poovanname"	Tamil	Ilaiyaraaja	
Thirupurasundari	"Odam Ondru Kaatril"	Tamil	Ilaiyaraaja	

=== 1979 ===
Film	Song	Language	Composer	Ref
Anbe Sangeetha	"Kandhanukku Rendu"	Tamil	Ilaiyaraaja	
Chakkalathi	"Enna Paattu Paada"	Tamil	Ilaiyaraaja	
Chakkalathi	"Vaada Vaattudhu"	Tamil	Ilaiyaraaja	
Dharma Yuddham	"Kanneerinaal (Bit Version of Oru Thanga Radhathil)"	Tamil	Ilaiyaraaja	
Kadavul Amaitha Medai	"Yei Thanni Nee Neeraada"	Tamil	Ilaiyaraaja	
Kavari Maan	"Ullangal Inbathil Aadattum"	Tamil	Ilaiyaraaja	
Lakshmi	"Thenna Marathile Thendral Adikkudhu"	Tamil	Ilaiyaraaja	
Manipoor Maamiyaar	"Rasigane En Arugil Vaa"	Tamil	Ilaiyaraaja	
Pagalil Oru Iravu	"Thottam Konda Raasaavey"	Tamil	Ilaiyaraaja	
Ponnu Oorukku Pudhusu	"Oram Po Oram Po"	Tamil	Ilaiyaraaja	
Ponnu Oorukku Pudhusu	"Oru Manja Kuruvi"	Tamil	Ilaiyaraaja	
Ponnu Oorukku Pudhusu	"Saamakozhi Koovudhamma"	Tamil	Ilaiyaraaja	
Ponnu Oorukku Pudhusu	"Unakkena Thaane Inneramaa"	Tamil	Ilaiyaraaja	
Ponnu Oorukku Pudhusu	"Veettukkoru Magana Pola"	Tamil	Ilaiyaraaja	
Puthiya Vaarpugal	"Thiruvizha Koothu"	Tamil	Ilaiyaraaja	
Uthiripookkal	"Ey Indha Poongaatru Thaalaatta"	Tamil	Ilaiyaraaja	

=== 1980 ===
Film	Song	Language	Composer	Ref
Rusi Kanda Poonai	"Anbu Mugam"	Tamil	Ilaiyaraaja	

=== 1981 ===
Film	Song	Language	Composer	Ref
Alaigal Oivadhillai	"Vaazhvellaam Aanandhame"	Tamil	Ilaiyaraaja	
Alaigal Oivadhillai	"Vizhiyil Vizhundhu"	Tamil	Ilaiyaraaja	
Seethakoka Chiluka	"Alalu Kalalu"	Telugu	Ilaiyaraaja	

=== 1982 ===
Film	Song	Language	Composer	Ref
Sakalakala Vallavan	"Amman Koil Kizhakkaale"	Tamil	Ilaiyaraaja	

=== 1983 ===
Film	Song	Language	Composer	Ref
Ayiram Nilave Vaa	"Achchuvellam Pachcharisi"	Tamil	Ilaiyaraaja	
Mann Vaasanai	"Indha Boomi Vedha Potaa"	Tamil	Ilaiyaraaja	
Mundhaanai Mudichu	"Velakku Vecha Nerathile"	Tamil	Ilaiyaraaja	
Kann Sivandhaal Mann Sivakkum	"Vandhaale Alli Poo"	Tamil	Ilaiyaraaja	
Eera Vizhi Kaaviyangal	"En Gaanam Engu Arangerum"	Tamil	Ilaiyaraaja	

=== 1984 ===
Film	Song	Language	Composer	Ref
Pudhumai Penn	"Yerigindra Dheepam"	Tamil	Ilaiyaraaja	
Poovilangu	"Aathaadi Paavaada Kaathaadaa"	Tamil	Ilaiyaraaja	
Vaazhkai	"Edhirkaalam Unakaaga"	Tamil	Ilaiyaraaja	
Vaidehi Kathirunthal	"Megam Karukayilae"	Tamil	Ilaiyaraaja	

=== 1985 ===
Film	Song	Language	Composer	Ref
Naan Sigappu Manithan	"Ellarume Thirudangathaan"	Tamil	Ilaiyaraaja	

=== 1986 ===
Film	Song	Language	Composer	Lyricist	Ref
Muthal Vasantham	"Aarum Athu Aazham Illai"	Tamil	Ilaiyaraaja		
Kadalora Kavithaigal	"Adi Aathaadi (Happy Version)"	Tamil	Ilaiyaraaja		
Kadalora Kavithaigal	"Das Das Chinnappadas"	Tamil	Ilaiyaraaja		
Karimedu Karuvaayan	"Adi Kadha Kelu Kadha Kelu"	Tamil	Ilaiyaraaja		
Thaaikku Oru Thaalaattu	"Alaiyil Midhandha Oru"	Tamil	Ilaiyaraaja		
Paaru Paaru Pattinam Paaru	"Ye Josiyam Solgiren"	Tamil	Ilaiyaraaja		

=== 1987 ===
Film	Song	Language	Composer	Ref
Graamathu Minnal	"Vaddi Edutha"	Tamil	Ilaiyaraaja	

=== 1988 ===
Film	Song	Language	Composer	Ref
Paadatha Thenikal	"Aathi Antham"	Tamil	Ilaiyaraaja	
Solla Thudikkudhu Manasu	"Vaayakkatti Vayitha Katti"	Tamil	Ilaiyaraaja	
En Bommukutty Ammavukku	"Yai Yaiyyayya Yai Yayyayya"	Tamil	Ilaiyaraaja	
Shenbagame Shenbagame	"Veluthu Kattikkadaa"	Tamil	Ilaiyaraaja	
Sakkarai Pandhal	"Vedham Onga"	Tamil	Ilaiyaraaja	

=== 1989 ===
Film	Song	Language	Composer	Ref
Poruthathu Pothum	"Aararo Paada Vantheney"	Tamil	Ilaiyaraaja	
Siva	"Velli Kizhama"	Tamil	Ilaiyaraaja	
Pudhu Pudhu Arthangal	"Eduthu Naan Vida Vaa En Paattai Thozhaa"	Tamil	Ilaiyaraaja	
Paattukku Oru Thalaivan	"Ellorudaiya Vaazhkkaiyilum"	Tamil	Ilaiyaraaja	
Enna Petha Raasa	"Ellorukkum Nallavennu Paera Vaanganum"	Tamil	Ilaiyaraaja	
Ennai Vittu Pokaathe	"Darisanam Kidaikkaadha"	Tamil	Ilaiyaraaja	
Enga Ooru Mappilai	"En Kaaveriye Kanneer Etharkku"	Tamil	Ilaiyaraaja	
Ashoka Chakravarthy	"Dharmala Logililo"	Telugu	Ilaiyaraaja	

=== 1990 ===
Film	Song	Language	Composer	Ref
Puthu Paattu	"Amma Amma Un Paarvaiyaal"	Tamil	Ilaiyaraaja	
Puthu Paattu	"Enga Ooru Kaadhala Pathi Enna Nenaikire"	Tamil	Ilaiyaraaja	
Puthu Paattu	"Nethu Oruthara Oruthara Paathom"	Tamil	Ilaiyaraaja	
Amman Kovil Thiruvizha	"Deivam Thandha Vaazhvukkellam"	Tamil	Ilaiyaraaja	
Aanandha Kummi	"Dharmadurai Pol Yevanada"	Tamil	Ilaiyaraaja	
Urudhi Mozhi	"Dhinakku Dhinakku Dham"	Tamil	Ilaiyaraaja	
Vellaiya Thevan	"Ethi Vaccha Kuthu Vilakku"	Tamil	Ilaiyaraaja	
Sirayil Sila Raagangal	"Ezhu Swaram"	Tamil	Ilaiyaraaja	
Pulan Visaranai	"Idhuthaan Idhukkuthaan"	Tamil	Ilaiyaraaja	
Karagattakaran	"Indamaan Undhan Sondhamaan"	Tamil	Ilaiyaraaja	
Periyamma	"Ival Thaane Penmani"	Tamil	Ilaiyaraaja	
Kavalukku Kettikaran	"Kaavalukku Gattikkaaran"	Tamil	Ilaiyaraaja	
Chembaruthi	"Kadaliley Ezhumbura Alaigala"	Tamil	Ilaiyaraaja	
Michael Madana Kama Rajan	"Kadha Kelu Kadha Kelu"	Tamil	Ilaiyaraaja	
Sirayil Sila Raagangal	"Kalludaika Aalillaamal"	Tamil	Ilaiyaraaja	
Unnai Solli Kutramillai	"Kettum Pattanam Poi Saer Enru"	Tamil	Ilaiyaraaja	
En Uyir Thozhan	"Macchi Mannaru En Manasukkule"	Tamil	Ilaiyaraaja	
En Uyir Thozhan	"Thambi Nee Nimirndhu Paarada"	Tamil	Ilaiyaraaja	
Pagalil Pournami	"Maname Avan Vaazhum"	Tamil	Ilaiyaraaja	
Innisai Mazhai	"Mangai Nee Maanganee"	Tamil	Ilaiyaraaja	
Geetha Vazhipaadu	"Maanikka Chilaiye"	Tamil	Ilaiyaraaja	
Amman Kovil Thiruvizha	"Manjola Kiliyirukku"	Tamil	Ilaiyaraaja	
Amman Kovil Thiruvizha	"Naan Sonnaal Kelamma"	Tamil	Ilaiyaraaja	
Panakkaaran	"Maratha Vachchavan Thanni Oothuvaan"	Tamil	Ilaiyaraaja	
Panakkaaran	"Ullukkulla Chakkaravarthy"	Tamil	Ilaiyaraaja	
Raja Kaiya Vacha	"Maruthaanee Arachene"	Tamil	Ilaiyaraaja	
My Dear Marthandan	"My Dear Marthanda"	Tamil	Ilaiyaraaja	
Dhuruva Natchathiram	"Peththu Pottadhaaro"	Tamil	Ilaiyaraaja	
Edhir Kaatru	"Saamiyaara Ponavanukku"	Tamil	Ilaiyaraaja	
Maruthu Paandi	"Singaara Selvangale"	Tamil	Ilaiyaraaja	
Thalattu Padava	"Sondham Endru Vandhavale"	Tamil	Ilaiyaraaja	
Ooru Vittu Orru Vandhu	"Sorgame Endraalum"	Tamil	Ilaiyaraaja	
Periya Veetu Pannakkaran	"Vandhaarai Vaazha Vaikkum"	Tamil	Ilaiyaraaja	
Kizhakku Vaasal	"Veettukku Veettukku Vaasappadi"	Tamil	Ilaiyaraaja	
Pondaatti Thevai	"Yaaradi Naan Thedum Kaadhali"	Tamil	Ilaiyaraaja	

=== 1991 ===
Film	Song	Language	Composer	Ref
Guna	"Appan Endrum Ammaiyendrum"	Tamil	Ilaiyaraaja	
Chinna Kuyil Paadudhu	"Appavukku Payyan vandhu Ponnu"	Tamil	Ilaiyaraaja	
Idhayam	"April Mayilae"	Tamil	Ilaiyaraaja	
Idhayam	"Pottu Vaitha Oru Vatta Nila (IR Version)"	Tamil	Ilaiyaraaja	
Pudhu Nellu Pudhu Naathu	"Bharani Bharani Paadi Varum"	Tamil	Ilaiyaraaja	
Pudhu Nellu Pudhu Naathu	"Salangachatham Kekkudhadi"	Tamil	Ilaiyaraaja	
Kumbakarai Thangaiah	"Ennai Oruvan Paada Chonnaan"	Tamil	Ilaiyaraaja	
Kannukkoru Vannakili	"Gaanam Than Kaatrodu"	Tamil	Ilaiyaraaja	
Ennarukil Nee Irunthal	"Indira Sundhariye Sondham"	Tamil	Ilaiyaraaja	
Thalattu Ketkuthamma	"Kaalam Enum Nooliley"	Tamil	Ilaiyaraaja	
Coolie No. 1	"Kalaya Nizama"	Telugu	Ilaiyaraaja	
Keechu Raallu	"Kalishitham Kalishitham"	Malayalam	Ilaiyaraaja	
En Rasavin Manasile	"Kuyil Paattu (Sad)"	Tamil	Ilaiyaraaja	
En Rasavin Manasile	"Penn Manasu Aazhamenru"	Tamil	Ilaiyaraaja	
En Rasavin Manasile	"Solai Pasunkuyile"	Tamil	Ilaiyaraaja	
Sami Potta Mudichu	"Maadhulankaniye"	Tamil	Ilaiyaraaja	
Pudhiya Raagam	"Malligai Maalai Katti"	Tamil	Ilaiyaraaja	
En Arugil Nee Irundhaal	"Nilave Nee Vara Vendum"	Tamil	Ilaiyaraaja	
Oorellaam Un Paattu	"Oorellaam Un Paattuthaan (IR Version)"	Tamil	Ilaiyaraaja	
Thambikku Oru Paattu	"Thaayendrum Thandhaiyendrum"	Tamil	Ilaiyaraaja	
Vetri Padigal	"Unnai Kaakkum Thaai Pol"	Tamil	Ilaiyaraaja	
Sir I Love You	"Udhikkindra Sengadhir"	Tamil	Ilaiyaraaja	
Pudhiya Swarangal	"Vaanam Ulla Kaalam Mattum (IR Version)"	Tamil	Ilaiyaraaja	

=== 1992 ===
Film	Song	Language	Composer	Ref
Nadodi Paattukkaran	"Aagaaya Thaamarai Arukil Vandhathey"	Tamil	Ilaiyaraaja	
Veera Thalattu	"Aala Pirantha Maharaasa"	Tamil	Ilaiyaraaja	
Aavarampoo	"Aalolam Paadi Asaindhaadum Kaatrae"	Tamil	Ilaiyaraaja	
Chinna Gownder	"Antha Vaanatha Pola"	Tamil	Ilaiyaraaja	
Chinna Gownder	"Kannu Pada Pokuthayya"	Tamil	Ilaiyaraaja	
Chinna Gownder	"Sollaaladicha Sundari"	Tamil	Ilaiyaraaja	
Bharathan	"Azhage Amudhe Poonthendral Thaalaattum"	Tamil	Ilaiyaraaja	
Bharathan	"Punnagaiyil Minsaaram"	Tamil	Ilaiyaraaja	
Bharathan	"Nal Veenai Naadham"	Tamil	Ilaiyaraaja	
Anthapuram	"Azhage Un Mugam Paaramal"	Tamil	Ilaiyaraaja	
Ponnuketha Purushan	"Cinema Cinema"	Tamil	Ilaiyaraaja	
Deiva Vaakku	"Indha Ammanukku Entha Ooru"	Tamil	Ilaiyaraaja	
Deiva Vaakku	"Katthuthadi Raakkozhi"	Tamil	Ilaiyaraaja	
Deiva Vaakku	"Valli Valli Ena Vandhaan"	Tamil	Ilaiyaraaja	
Va Va Vasanthame	"Indha Kaathal Vanthu"	Tamil	Ilaiyaraaja	
Vedic Chanting	"Introduction to Vedic Chanting"	Sanskrit	Ilaiyaraaja	
Kalikaalam	"Kaalam Kalikaalam"	Tamil	Ilaiyaraaja	
Vanna Vanna Pookkal	"Kannamma Kaadhal Enum Kavithai"	Tamil	Ilaiyaraaja	
Nadodi Thendral	"Maniye Manikkuyile"	Tamil	Ilaiyaraaja	
Nadodi Thendral	"Oru Kanam Oru Yugamaaga"	Tamil	Ilaiyaraaja	
Unna Nenachen Paattu Padichen	"Mundhi Mundhi Naayakare"	Tamil	Ilaiyaraaja	
Chinna Thaayi	"Naan Eri Karai (Pathos Version)"	Tamil	Ilaiyaraaja	
Naangal	"Namma Bossu"	Tamil	Ilaiyaraaja	
Naangal	"Paaradi Kuyile Paasamalargali (IR Version)"	Tamil	Ilaiyaraaja	
Marutode Naa Mogudu	"O Raama Silakkamma"	Telugu	Ilaiyaraaja	
Vedic Chanting	"Paapoham Paapakarma"	Sanskrit	Ilaiyaraaja	
Pattudala	"Sarangi Sarangi"	Telugu	Ilaiyaraaja	

=== 1993 ===
Film	Song	Language	Composer	Ref
Ulle Veliye	"Aariraaro Paadum Ullam"	Tamil	Ilaiyaraaja	
Udan Pirappu	"Chozhar Kula"	Tamil	Ilaiyaraaja	
Aranmanai Kili	"En Thaayenum Koyile Kaakka Maranthitta"	Tamil	Ilaiyaraaja	
Thalattu	"Enekkena Oruvarum"	Tamil	Ilaiyaraaja	
Valli	"Enna Enna Kanavu Kandaayo"	Tamil	Ilaiyaraaja	
Ezhai Jaathi	"Indha Veedu Namakku Sondham Illai"	Tamil	Ilaiyaraaja	
Chinna Jameen	"Naan Yaaru Enakkedhum"	Tamil	Ilaiyaraaja	
Sakkarai Thevan	"Nalla Velli Kizhamaiyile"	Tamil	Ilaiyaraaja	
Aranmanai Kili	"Raamarai Ninaikkum Anumaaru"	Tamil	Ilaiyaraaja	
I Love India	"Paasam Vaitha Ullam"	Tamil	Ilaiyaraaja	
Dhuruva Natchathiram	"Thaali Embadhu Inge"	Tamil	Ilaiyaraaja	
Koyil Kaalai	"Thaayundu Thandhai Undu"	Tamil	Ilaiyaraaja	
Ponnumani	"Adiye Vanjikodi"	Tamil	Karthik Raja	

=== 1994 ===
Film	Song	Language	Composer	Ref
Pudhupatti Ponnuthaayi	"Azhagaana Nam Paandi Naattinile"	Tamil	Ilaiyaraaja	
Kanmani	"Netru Vandha Kaatru"	Tamil	Ilaiyaraaja	
Adharmam	"Nooru Vayasu Vaazha Vendum (IR Version)"	Tamil	Ilaiyaraaja	
Adharmam	"Oru Pakkam Oru Nyaayam"	Tamil	Ilaiyaraaja	
Priyanka	"Nyaabagam Illaiyo (Duet)"	Tamil	Ilaiyaraaja	
Priyanka	"Nyaabagam Illaiyo (Solo)"	Tamil	Ilaiyaraaja	
Kaathirukka Neramillai	"O Kasthuri Maane"	Tamil	Ilaiyaraaja	

=== 1995 ===
Film	Song	Language	Composer	Ref
Aanazhagan	"Nillaadha Vennila"	Tamil		
Avathaaram	"Arithaaratha Poosikolla Aasai"	Tamil	Ilaiyaraaja	
Avathaaram	"Chandirarum Sooriyarum"	Tamil	Ilaiyaraaja	
Avathaaram	"Oru Gundu Mani Kulungudhadi"	Tamil	Ilaiyaraaja	
Avathaaram	"Thendral Vandhu Theendum Bodhu"	Tamil	Ilaiyaraaja	
Raasaiyya	"Dindukallu Dindukkallu"	Tamil	Ilaiyaraaja	
Paattu Paadava	"Nil Nil Nil Badhil Sol Sol Sol"	Tamil	Ilaiyaraaja	
Paattu Paadava	"Vazhi Vidu Vazhi Vidu"	Tamil	Ilaiyaraaja	
Maya Bazaar 1995	"Oru Oorile Oru Raajakumaaran"	Tamil	Ilaiyaraaja	
Ellaame En Raasa Thaan	"Oru Sandhana Kaattukkule"	Tamil	Ilaiyaraaja	
Thedi Vandha Raasa	"Raasava Thedi Vandha"	Tamil	Ilaiyaraaja	
Paattu Vaathiyaar	"Sarigamapadhanisa (Title Song)"	Tamil	Ilaiyaraaja	
Ellaame En Raasa Thaan	"Veenaikki Veena Kunju"	Tamil	Ilaiyaraaja	

=== 1996 ===
Film	Song	Language	Composer	Ref
Shiva Sainya	"Chikka Mangaloora O Chikka Mallige"	Kannada	Ilaiyaraaja	
Poomani	"Enn Paattu Enn Paattu"	Tamil	Ilaiyaraaja	
Pooncholai	"Gaana Kuyile"	Tamil	Ilaiyaraaja	
Shiva Sainya	"Jailai Hutti Bayalige"	Kannada	Ilaiyaraaja	
Katta Panchayathu	"Nalla Kaalam Porandhida"	Tamil	Ilaiyaraaja	
Gulaabi	"O Prema Devathey (With Introduction)"	Kannada	Ilaiyaraaja	
Irattai Roja	"Pombalainga Kayyile Kudumbam"	Tamil	Ilaiyaraaja	
Poomani	"Thol Mela"	Tamil	Ilaiyaraaja	

=== 1997 ===
Film	Song	Language	Composer	Ref
Bhoomigeetha	"Aa Devarilli Maaduva Boomi"	Kannada	Ilaiyaraaja	
Bhoomigeetha	"Bhoodyaaviyaa Habba Habba"	Kannada	Ilaiyaraaja	
Punniyavathi	"Adi Paninjaa"	Tamil	Ilaiyaraaja	
Punniyavathi	"Oru Aalam Poovai"	Tamil	Ilaiyaraaja	
Punniyavathi	"Unakkoruthi Porandhuruppaa"	Tamil	Ilaiyaraaja	
Themmangu Paattukaaran	"Chinna Chinna Vaarthaiyile"	Tamil	Ilaiyaraaja	
Geetha	"Chinna Chinna Vaarthayiley"	Tamil	Ilaiyaraaja	
Kadhalukku Mariyadhai	"Ennai Thaalatta Varuvaalo"	Tamil	Ilaiyaraaja	
Ezhumalaiyan Mahimai	"Entha Jenmam"	Tamil	Ilaiyaraaja	
Ezhumalaiyan Mahimai	"Kaala Kaala"	Tamil	Ilaiyaraaja	
Gulaabi	"Kelisathey Prema"	Kannada	Ilaiyaraaja	
Devathai	"Naal Dhorum Endhan Kannil Nee Pournami"	Tamil	Ilaiyaraaja	
Nammoora Mandaara Hoove	"Om Kaaradhi Kande (IR-KS Chithra Duet)"	Kannada	Ilaiyaraaja	
Vasuke	"Thangachi Dhaan Thanga Puraava"	Tamil	Ilaiyaraaja	
Oru Yaathramozhi	"Yeri Kanal Kaatre"	Malayalam	Ilaiyaraaja	
Ullaasam	"Yaaro Yaaryaro"	Tamil	Karthik Raja	

=== 1998 ===
Film	Song	Language	Composer	Ref
Senthooram	"Adi Unna Kaanaama"	Tamil	Ilaiyaraaja	
Desiya Geetham	"Amma Neeyum"	Tamil	Ilaiyaraaja	
Thiruppu Munai	"Ammaana Summa Illadaa"	Tamil	Ilaiyaraaja	
Desiya Geetham	"Annan Gandhi"	Tamil	Ilaiyaraaja	
Anthapuram	"Asal Em Guruthuku Raadhu"	Telugu	Ilaiyaraaja	
Kaadhalukku Mariyaadai	"Ayya Veedu"	Tamil	Ilaiyaraaja	
Senthooram	"Chinna Manikkaaha"	Tamil	Ilaiyaraaja	
Alaigal Oivathillai	"Darisanam Kidaikkadha"	Tamil	Ilaiyaraaja	
Thalaimurai	"Enga Maharaanikkenna"	Tamil	Ilaiyaraaja	
Kumbakonam Gopalu	"Enna Janmamadi Penn Janmam"	Tamil	Ilaiyaraaja	
Thalaimurai	"Enna Petha Raasa"	Tamil	Ilaiyaraaja	
Kizhakkum Maerkkum	"Ennoda Ulagam Veru"	Tamil	Ilaiyaraaja	
Kavala Padathey Sahothara	"Eshwara Allah Tere Naam"	Tamil	Ilaiyaraaja	
Desiya Geetham	"Ezha Paazha Ozhachu"	Tamil	Ilaiyaraaja	
Poonthottam	"Iniya Malargal Malarum"	Tamil	Ilaiyaraaja	
Dharma	"Iru Kangal"	Tamil	Ilaiyaraaja	
Veera Thalattu	"Kadha Pola Thonum Idhu Kadhayum Illa"	Tamil	Ilaiyaraaja	
Kaadhal Kavithai	"Konji Paesu Kovam Konda Kannamma"	Tamil	Ilaiyaraaja	
Kizhakkum Merkkum	"Kooda Porantha Sonthame"	Tamil	Ilaiyaraaja	
Kannathaal	"Maalai Veyil Azhagi"	Tamil	Ilaiyaraaja	
Desiya Geetham	"Nanba Nanba"	Tamil	Ilaiyaraaja	
Kizhakkum Merkkum	"Oru Kaththarikaaikku Otha Rooba"	Tamil	Ilaiyaraaja	
Kumbakonam Gopalu	"Oru Nandhavana Kuyil"	Tamil	Ilaiyaraaja	
Kavalai Padaadhe Sagodhaara	"Ponnin Thiruvona Thirunaalum"	Tamil	Ilaiyaraaja	
Hoomale	"Preethiya Gellalu"	Kannada	Ilaiyaraaja	
Kangalin Vaarthaigal	"Sree Raamane (IR-KS Chithra Duet)"	Tamil	Ilaiyaraaja	
Sendhooram	"Un Pakkathula Oru Poova"	Tamil	Ilaiyaraaja	
Poonthottam	"Vaanathil Irundhu"	Tamil	Ilaiyaraaja	
Annan	"Aalamarathu Kuyile"	Tamil	Ilaiyaraaja	
Annan	"Vayasu Pulla Vayasu Pulla"	Tamil	Ilaiyaraaja	
Poonthottam	"Vennilavukku Aasai Patten (IR Version)"	Tamil	Ilaiyaraaja	

=== 1999 ===
Film	Song	Language	Composer	Ref
Kannathaal	"Amman Pugazh Paada Enakku"	Tamil	Ilaiyaraaja	
Chinna Ramasamy Periya Ramasamy	"Athiri Paacha Kathiri Kolu"	Tamil	Ilaiyaraaja	
Sethu	"Enge Sellum"	Tamil	Ilaiyaraaja	
Annan	"Kanmanikku Vaazhthu"	Tamil	Ilaiyaraaja	
Manam Virumbuthe Unnai	"Koottu Kuyiley"	Tamil	Ilaiyaraaja	
Ponnu Veettukaaran	"Nandhavana Kuyile (IR Version)"	Tamil	Ilaiyaraaja	
Kummi Paattu	"Poonguyile Pooguyile"	Tamil	Ilaiyaraaja	
Thodarum	"Serndhu Vaazhum Neram"	Tamil	Ilaiyaraaja	
Nilave Mugam Kaattu	"Poongaathu Adhu Boomi Engum"	Tamil	Ilaiyaraaja	
Nilave Mugam Kaattu	"Thannan Thaniyaaga Oru Theevundu"	Tamil	Ilaiyaraaja	
Bharani	"Thenaa Odum Oda Karaiyil (IR Version)"	Tamil	Ilaiyaraaja	
Nilave Mugam Kaattu	"Thendralai Kandu Kolla"	Tamil	Ilaiyaraaja	
Sethu	"Vaarthai Thavari Vittaai"	Tamil	Ilaiyaraaja	

=== 2000 ===
Film	Song	Language	Composer	Ref
Kaakkai Chiraginile	"Paadi Thirindha En Thozhi (IR Version)"	Tamil	Ilaiyaraaja	
Karuvelam Pookkal	"Yeale Ada"	Tamil	Ilaiyaraaja	
Thirunelveli	"Ini Naalum Thirunaal"	Tamil	Ilaiyaraaja	
Thirunelveli	"Saadhi Enum Kodumai"	Tamil	Ilaiyaraaja	
Thirunelveli	"Thirunelveli Seemaiyile"	Tamil	Ilaiyaraaja	
Karisakkattu Poove	"Vaanam Paartha Karisakkaadu"	Tamil	Ilaiyaraaja	
Bharathi	"French Music"	Tamil	Ilaiyaraaja	
Bharathi	"Nallathor Veenai Seidhen"	Tamil	Ilaiyaraaja	
Bharathi	"Ninnaichcharan"	Tamil	Ilaiyaraaja	

=== 2001 ===
Film	Song	Language	Composer	Ref
Kanna Unnai Thaedukiren	"Konjam Kolusu Paattu"	Tamil	Ilaiyaraaja	
Kanna Unnai Thaedukiren	"Oor Urangum Nerathil (IR Version)"	Tamil	Ilaiyaraaja	
Aandan Adimai	"Undhan Rajyathil"	Tamil	Ilaiyaraaja	
Kadhal Jaathi	"Enna Maranthalum"	Tamil	Ilaiyaraaja	
Nandhaa	"Engengo Kaalgal Sellum"	Tamil	Yuvan Shankar Raja	
Nandhaa	"Amma Endralle"	Tamil	Yuvan Shankar Raja	

=== 2002 ===
Film	Song	Language	Composer	Ref
Azhagi	"Un Kuthama En Kuthama"	Tamil	Ilaiyaraaja	
Devan	"Intha Ezhai Geetham"	Tamil	Ilaiyaraaja	
Devan	"Thaalaattum Kaatre"	Tamil	Ilaiyaraaja	
Album	"Thaazhampoo"	Tamil	Karthik Raja	
Ramanaa	"Oorukkoru"	Tamil	Ilaiyaraaja	
Ramanaa	"Vaanaviley"	Tamil	Ilaiyaraaja	
Solla Marandha Kadhai	"Amma Sonna"	Tamil	Ilaiyaraaja	
Solla Marandha Kadhai	"Panam Mattum"	Tamil	Ilaiyaraaja	
Solla Marandha Kadhai	"Jakkamma"	Tamil	Ilaiyaraaja	
Ninu Choodaka Nenundalenu	"Kommallo Koyila"	Telugu	Ilaiyaraaja	

=== 2003 ===
Film	Song	Language	Composer	Ref
Unnai Charanadaindhen	"Natpu Natpu"	Tamil	S. P. Balasubrahmanyam	
Pithamagan	"Yaaradhu Yaaradhu"	Tamil	Ilaiyaraaja	

=== 2004 ===
Film	Song	Language	Composer	Ref
Virumaandi	"Andha Kandamani"	Tamil	Ilaiyaraaja	
Virumaandi	"Karbagraham Vitu Samy Veliyerathu"	Tamil	Ilaiyaraaja	
Kamaraj	"Oorukku Uzhaithavane"	Tamil	Ilaiyaraaja	
Kudaikul Mazhai	"Adiye Kiliye"	Tamil	Karthik Raja	
Namma Preethiya Ramu	"Badavana Gudisalanu"	Kannada	Ilaiyaraaja	

=== 2005 ===
Film	Song	Language	Composer	Ref
Adhu Oru Kana Kaalam	"Kaatu Vazhi"	Tamil	Ilaiyaraaja	
Ponmudipuzhayorathu	"Maankutti Mainakkutti"	Malayalam	Ilaiyaraaja	
Ponmudipuzhayorathu	"Pandathe Naattinpuram "	Malayalam	Ilaiyaraaja	
Oru Naal Oru Kanavu	"Kaatril Varum Geethame III"	Tamil	Ilaiyaraaja	
Karagattakkari	"Ennapetha"	Tamil	Ilaiyaraaja	

=== 2006 ===
Film	Song	Language	Composer	Ref
Pattiyal	"Namma Kattula Mazhai Peiyuthu"	Tamil	Yuvan Shankar Raja	
Shiva	"Shapath"	Hindi	Ilaiyaraaja	
Shiva	"Enno Tyagala"	Telugu	Ilaiyaraaja	
Shiva	"Enge Naam Desam Poguthu"	Tamil	Ilaiyaraaja	
Madhu	"Ketkavillaya"	Tamil	Ilaiyaraaja	
Desiya Paravai	"Chinna Chinna Vannakilikkoru"	Tamil	Ilaiyaraaja	

=== 2007 ===
Film	Song	Language	Composer	Ref
Anumanaspadam	"Raa Raa Raa"	Telugu	Ilaiyaraaja	
Paruthiveeran	"Ariyadha Vayasu"	Tamil	Yuvan Shankar Raja	
Maya Kannadi	"Yele Enga Vantha"	Tamil	Ilaiyaraaja	
Maya Kannadi	"Kaadhal Indru"	Tamil	Ilaiyaraaja	
Maya Kannadi	"Kaasu Kaiyil"	Tamil	Ilaiyaraaja	
Maamadurai	"Madurai Maduraithaan"	Tamil	Karthik Raja	
Inimey Nangathan	"Unnai Kezh"	Tamil	Ilaiyaraaja	
Kattradhu Thamizh	"Paravaiye Engu Irukkiraai"	Tamil	Yuvan Shankar Raja	
Aa Dinagalu	"Sihi Gaali"	Kannada	Ilaiyaraaja	

=== 2008 ===
Film	Song	Language	Composer	Ref
Uliyin Osai	"Pularkindra Pozhuthu"	Tamil	Ilaiyaraaja	
Uliyin Osai	"Alaiyellam Chozhavala"	Tamil	Ilaiyaraaja	
Uliyin Osai	"Aganthaiyil Aadavatha"	Tamil	Ilaiyaraaja	
SMS	"Ponathevide"	Malayalam	Ilaiyaraaja	
Dhanam	"Kattilukku Matthumthana Pombala"	Tamil	Ilaiyaraaja	
Silambattam	"Machaan Machaan"	Tamil	Yuvan Shankar Raja	

=== 2009 ===
Film	Song	Language	Composer	Ref
Naan Kadavul	"Oru Kaatril Alaiyum"	Tamil	Ilaiyaraaja	
Sarvam	"Adada Vaa"	Tamil	Yuvan Shankar Raja	

=== 2010 ===
Film	Song	Language	Composer	Ref
Goa	"Ooru Nalla Oor"	Tamil	Yuvan Shankar Raja	
Goa	"Vaalibaa Vaa Vaa"	Tamil	Yuvan Shankar Raja	
Zamana	"El Elu Janmakku"	Kannada	Karthik Raja	

=== 2011 ===
Film	Song	Language	Composer	Ref
Azhagarsamiyin Kuthirai	"Kuthikkira Kuthikkira"	Tamil	Ilaiyaraaja	

=== 2014 ===
Film	Song	Language	Composer	Ref
Un Samayal Arayil	"Kaatru Veliyil"	Tamil	Ilaiyaraaja	
Vai Raja Vai	"Move Your Body"	Tamil	Yuvan Shankar Raja	

=== 2015 ===
Film	Song	Language	Composer	Ref
Touring Talkies	"Uyire Unnai"	Tamil	Ilaiyaraaja	

=== 2017 ===
Film	Song	Language	Composer	Ref
Muthuramalingam	"Manasil Niranjavane"	Tamil	Ilaiyaraaja	
Anbanavan Asaradhavan Adangadhavan	"Rottula Vandi Oodudhu"	Tamil	Yuvan Shankar Raja	

=== 2018 ===
Film	Song	Language	Composer	Ref
18.05.2009	"Ethanai Ethanai Kodumai"	Tamil	Ilaiyaraaja	
Merku Thodarchi Malai	"Kekkatha Vathiyam"	Tamil	Ilaiyaraaja	
60 Vayadu Maaniram	"Iraivinai Thedi"	Tamil	Ilaiyaraaja	
Maari 2	"Maari's Anandhi"	Tamil	Yuvan Shankar Raja	

=== 2019 ===
Film	Song	Language	Composer	Ref
Hero	"Aayiram Mugangal"	Tamil	Yuvan Shankar Raja	

=== 2022 ===
Film	Song	Language	Composer	Ref
Clap	"Manadhai En Moodinaai"	Tamil	Ilaiyaraaja	
Clap	"Manasutho Choodaleni"	Telugu	Ilaiyaraaja	
Akka Kuruvi	"Maanguyelum Kizhiyum"	Tamil	Ilaiyaraaja	
Maayon	"Krishna Bhajan Singara Madhana"	Tamil	Ilaiyaraaja	
Maayon	"Gandharva"	Tamil	Ilaiyaraaja	
Maamanithan	"Thattiputta"	Tamil	Ilaiyaraaja, Yuvan Shankar Raja	
Viruman	"Aagasam Kannukkulla"	Tamil	Yuvan Shankar Raja	

=== 2023 ===
Film	Song	Language	Composer
Viduthalai Part 1	"Kaattumalli"	Tamil	Ilaiyaraaja
Viduthalai Part 1	"Arutperunjodhi"	Tamil	Ilaiyaraaja
Tamilarasan	"Pakkurappo Pakkurappo"	Tamil	Ilaiyaraaja
Modern Love Chennai	"Nenjil Oru Minnal"	Tamil	Ilaiyaraaja
Modern Love Chennai	"Thendral"	Tamil	Ilaiyaraaja
Margazhi Thingal	"Pudichurukka" (Version 2)	Tamil	Ilaiyaraaja

=== 2024 ===
Film	Song	Language	Composer
Saamaniyan	"Thatti Vaa"	Tamil	Ilaiyaraaja
Viduthalai Part 2	"Dhinam Dhinamum"	Tamil	Ilaiyaraaja

== Non-film songs ==
Year	Song	Album	Language	Non-Filmy Album Description
1989	Amma Amma	Geetha Vazhipaadu	Tamil	Devotional album
1989	Annaiye Ambikaiye	Geetha Vazhipaadu	Tamil	Devotional album
1989	Aananda Vellam Neeyandro	Geetha Vazhipaadu	Tamil	Devotional album
1989	Akilandeshwari	Geetha Vazhipaadu	Tamil	Devotional album
1989	En Paava Kanakkukku	Geetha Vazhipaadu	Tamil	Devotional album
1989	Velli Mulaithadhu Vaanam Veluthadhu	Geetha Vazhipaadu	Tamil	Devotional album
1989	Vaigai Nadhi Karaiyil	Geetha Vazhipaadu	Tamil	Devotional album
2000	Arunachala Siva	Raajavin Ramana Maalai	Tamil	Devotional album
2000	Arunamalai Guru Ramana	Raajavin Ramana Maalai	Tamil	Devotional album
2000	Bhikshai Paathiram	Raajavin Ramana Maalai	Tamil	Devotional album
2000	Enadhu Udalum	Raajavin Ramana Maalai	Tamil	Devotional album
2000	Kaaranam Indri	Raajavin Ramana Maalai	Tamil	Devotional album
2000	Sadha Sadha Unnai Ninaindhu Ninaindhu	Raajavin Ramana Maalai	Tamil	Devotional album
2000	Sutrugundra Ulagathile	Raajavin Ramana Maalai	Tamil	Devotional album
2000	Vinnor Thozhum Thiru	Raajavin Ramana Maalai	Tamil	Devotional album
2005	Muthunatraamam Poo Maalai – Thirupporchunnam	Thiruvasakam in Symphony	Tamil	Oratorio/Devotional album
2005	Polla Vinayen – Siva Puranam	Thiruvasakam in Symphony	Tamil	Oratorio/Devotional album
2005	Pooerukonum Purandharanum – Thirukkothumbi	Thiruvasakam in Symphony	Tamil	Oratorio/Devotional album
2005	Poovaar Senni Mannan – Yaathirai Paththu	Thiruvasakam in Symphony	Tamil	Oratorio/Devotional album
2005	Putril Vaazh Aravum – Achcha Paththu	Thiruvasakam in Symphony	Tamil	Oratorio/Devotional album
2005	Umbarkat Arase – Pidiththa Paththu	Thiruvasakam in Symphony	Tamil	Oratorio/Devotional album
2005	3 Note Song	Ilaiyaraaja Music Journey – Live in Italy	Tamil	-- (Telugu in a repeat performance in Chennai. Italy's concert was only music with the notes being hummed by Ilaiyaraaja) Composed for the Concert
2006	Arunachala Arunachala	Guru Ramana Geetham	Tamil	Devotional album
2006	Chinna Payyan Oruvan	Guru Ramana Geetham	Tamil	Devotional album
2006	Enge Sendraalum	Guru Ramana Geetham	Tamil	Devotional album
2006	Ennai Kavarndhizhutha	Guru Ramana Geetham	Tamil	Devotional album
2006	Indroru Naal Kazhindhadhu	Guru Ramana Geetham	Tamil	Devotional album
2006	Ippirappil Enna Seidhen	Guru Ramana Geetham	Tamil	Devotional album
2006	Annamalaiyaar Mel Anbu Konden	Guru Ramana Geetham	Tamil	Devotional album
2006	Yen Ooru Sivapuram Paraloga Perumpuram	Guru Ramana Geetham	Tamil	Devotional album
2007	Annai Illai Thandhai Illai	Sri Ramana Naadha Amudham	Tamil	Devotional album (composed with M. S. Viswanathan)
2007	Annamalai Idhu (sung with MS Viswanathan)	Sri Ramana Naadha Amudham	Tamil	Devotional album
2007	Thannaiye Tharum Ramanarukku	Sri Ramana Naadha Amudham	Tamil	Devotional album
2007	Enakkul Iruppadhu	Amma Paamaalai	Tamil	Devotional album
2008	Ayyappan Azhaikkaamal	Manikandan Geeta Maala	Tamil	Devotional album
2008	Bhakthanin Baarangal	Manikandan Geeta Maala	Tamil	Devotional album
2008	Engum Boologathil	Manikandan Geeta Maala	Tamil	Devotional album
2008	Irumudi Kattukkulle	Manikandan Geeta Maala	Tamil	Devotional album
2008	Kaatre Kaatre Nillu	Manikandan Geeta Maala	Tamil	Devotional album
2008	Udambellaam Oru Romaanjanam	Manikandan Geeta Maala	Tamil	Devotional album
2009	Inba Irundha Nilaiyil Nindre Maadhu	Annamalai Ramanaandi	Tamil	Devotional album
2009	Naan Ennum Porul Nee	Annamalai Ramanaandi	Tamil	Devotional album
2010	Indha Kovil Mattum	Baba Pugazh Maalai	Tamil	Devotional album
2010	Poovaaram Sootti	Baba Pugazh Maalai	Tamil	Devotional album
2011	Enn Manadhai Thedi Paarthen	Ramana Saranam	Tamil	Devotional album
2011	Eppadi Paaduveno	Ramana Saranam	Tamil	Devotional album
2011	Kaana Kidaikkaadha	Ramana Saranam	Tamil	Devotional album
2011	Maayaiyil Ramana Maayanavan	Ramana Saranam	Tamil	Devotional album
2011	Neenga Annamalaikki	Ramana Saranam	Tamil	Devotional album
2011	Aaraadha Arul Marundhu	Ramana Saranam	Tamil	Devotional album
2011	Unnai Vittaal Yaarum Illai	Ramana Saranam	Tamil	Devotional album
2011	Nin Thiruvadiyil Vizhum	Ramana Saranam	Tamil	Devotional album
2012	Kanden Kanden	Srivilliputhur Andal	Tamil	Devotional album composed by Karthik Raja
2013	Annamalaiyil Oru Aandi	Sri Ramana Aaram	Tamil	Devotional album
2013	Arunamalai Ninaikka Mukthi Undu	Sri Ramana Aaram	Tamil	Devotional album
2013	Irukkum Unai Ariyaa	Sri Ramana Aaram	Tamil	Devotional album
2013	Nenjai Pisaiyudhe Un Uruvam	Sri Ramana Aaram	Tamil	Devotional album
2013	Om Namo Bhagawathe Sri Ramanaaya	Sri Ramana Aaram	Tamil	Devotional album
2013	Paavam Theerthidum Gangaiyum	Sri Ramana Aaram	Tamil	Devotional album
2013	Potraadhu Naal Izhandhen	Sri Ramana Aaram	Tamil	Devotional album
2013	Ramanan Pol Vandhadhu	Sri Ramana Aaram	Tamil	Devotional album
2013	Ulagama Ulla Alavum	Sri Ramana Aaram	Tamil	Devotional album
2013	Yaarundu Logathile	Sri Ramana Aaram	Tamil	Devotional album
2013	Nin Charan Ena Solluven	Sri Ramana Aaram	Tamil	Devotional album
2013	Ninaiya Manadhil Ramana	Sri Ramana Aaram	Tamil	Devotional album
2014	Anbum Sivamum – Thirumandhiram Narration	Swappnam	Tamil	Classical Dance Drama
Unknown	Aananda Kandey Naanindhu	Honnina Therinali	Kannada	Devotional album
