= Nenju Porukkuthillaiye =

Tamil talk show program

- Also known as: Tamil: நெஞ்சு பொறுக்குதில்லயே...
- Genre: Talk show
- Presented by: John Dhanraj
- Country of origin: India
- Original language: Tamil
- No. of episodes: 183

Production
- Running time: approx. 1 hrs.

Original release
- Network: Kalaignar TV
- Release: 4 August 2013

Nenju Porukkuthillaiye (English: My Heart Is Bleeding) (Tamil: நெஞ்சு பொருக்குதில்லயே) is a Tamil talk show aired on Tamil television channel Kalaignar TV network, hosted by John Dhanraj. The programme was started to bring a change in Indian society by discussing several issues faced by common peoples, their causes and possibilities of social justice.

Nenju Porukkuthillaiye was widely appreciated by several politicians and social activists for its social research and analysis, gathering positive feedbacks from the common people as well.

== List of episodes ==
- Crime against women
- School children's safety
- Farmers suicide
- Electricity problem in Tamil Nadu
- Safety in ATM centres
- Medical - service or business
- Bank loan for education
- Corporate development(Tamil Culture)
