= Sarvam (soundtrack) =

2009 soundtrack album by Yuvan Shankar Raja

Soundtrack album by Yuvan Shankar Raja
- Released: 14 February 2009
- Recorded: 2006–2008
- Genre: Feature film soundtrack
- Length: 24:00
- Language: Tamil
- Label: Ayngaran Music; An Ak Audio; Think Music
- Producer: Yuvan Shankar Raja

Yuvan Shankar Raja chronology
Siva Manasula Sakthi (2009)	Sarvam (2009)	Vaamanan (2009)

Sarvam is the soundtrack album for the 2009 Indian Tamil-language romantic thriller film of the same name starring Arya and Trisha directed by Vishnuvardhan. The film score and the soundtrack were composed by Yuvan Shankar Raja, who renewed his previous association with Vishnuvardhan, for whom he had earlier created successful musical albums in Arinthum Ariyamalum (2005), Pattiyal (2006) and Billa (2007). The album featuring five songs had lyrics written by Pa. Vijay, which released on 14 February 2009 to positive response.

== Development ==
The album comprises five tracks with lyrics for which were written by Vishnuvardhan's norm lyricist, Pa. Vijay. Out of the five tracks, two were sung by composer Yuvan Shankar Raja himself and one by his father Ilaiyaraaja. Other singers who gave vocals for the tracks in the album are Andrea Jeremiah, Vijay Yesudas, SuVi, Javed Ali and Madhushree.

According to Vishnuvardhan, two of the songs ("Neethane" and "Sutta Suriyana") were composed by Yuvan during October 2006, before he moved to work on Billa, as the film was shelved that December, citing production and casting issues, but was later revived. The song "Adada Vaa" was originally composed for the film Aayirathil Oruvan (2010) when Yuvan was first signed to score the music, but which he left in the midst, after he had a fall out with director Selvaraghavan. The track "Un Mela Aasadhaan", composed by G. V. Prakash Kumar, has a similar sounding to the track "Adada".

Yuvan used few Arabic and English lyrics in the track "Adada", accompanied by the flute interludes. The track "Kaatrukulle", which Yuvan had considered as his personal favourite, was composed at his studio in November 2008, when Cyclone Nisha made its landfall and preceded by heavy rains in Chennai and its surrounding locations. Taking the rain and the climate as an "inspiration", Yuvan had recorded and sang the track in his studio.

== Marketing and release ==
The soundtrack was formally released on Valentine's Day (14 February 2009), at the Inox Complex, located at Citi Center in Chennai. The cast and crew of the film attended the event, wearing t-shirts with the film's logo being branded. Citing the reason for the audio release on Valentine's Day, Vishnuvardhan had said that "this was his first film where romance had an important place where the film would be a romantic thriller". A contest was held for couples on the audio launch, where they were asked to write their names on a chit of paper for a lucky draw, the winners of the contest might get the film's audio CD for free. As a part of the promotional campaign, Ayngaran International released promotional audio clips of the songs of a duration of nearly four minutes overall, and a one-minute teaser trailer that features video clippings of three of the songs ("Adada Vaa", "Siragugal" and "Sutta Suriyana") were released a month after the audio launch.

== Reception ==
The album received positive reviews. Behindwoods.com reviewer Malathy Sundaram gave it three stars out of five and wrote: "For the second time (after Aegan) Yuvan has attempted to break free of the general norms of music here and the result is rather pleasing. The album feels fresh and breezy. With relevant picturization, the songs could make an impact". Rediff.com reviewer Pavithra Srinivasan too gave three stars out of five and wrote: "Sarvam is appealing" and "It looks like Yuvan, after a couple of not-so-memorable efforts, is on his way to finding his groove again. Sarvam manages to snag your attention, in a good way". An Indiaglitz.com reviewer wrote: "On the whole, Yuvan's melodies would turn to be the chartbusters of the season and any guesses about best picks. Adada Vaa Asathala would go straight onto everyone's music library on their I-pods and mobiles. Sutta Suriyana is one more song that enlivens the feel while Signature Music would rock on the air", giving the verdict of "effectually brilliant". Milliblog.com reviewer Karthik wrote: "After two average soundtracks, Yuvan gets his groove back", and later listed the album as the "Top Tamil OST of 2009" and the song Neethane as the "Top Tamil song of 2009" in his annual music round-up.

== Track listing ==
All lyrics are written by Pa. Vijay.

No.	Title	Singer(s)	Length
1.	"Adada Vaa"	Ilayaraaja, Andrea Jeremiah, SuVi	4:31
2.	"Neethane"	Yuvan Shankar Raja	5:12
3.	"Sutta Suriyanae"	Vijay Yesudas	4:32
4.	"Kaatrukulle"	Yuvan Shankar Raja	4:23
5.	"Siragugal"	Javed Ali, Madhushree	5:22
Total length:			24:00
