= List of awards and nominations received by Ilaiyaraaja =

List of awards and nominations won by Ilaiyaraaja
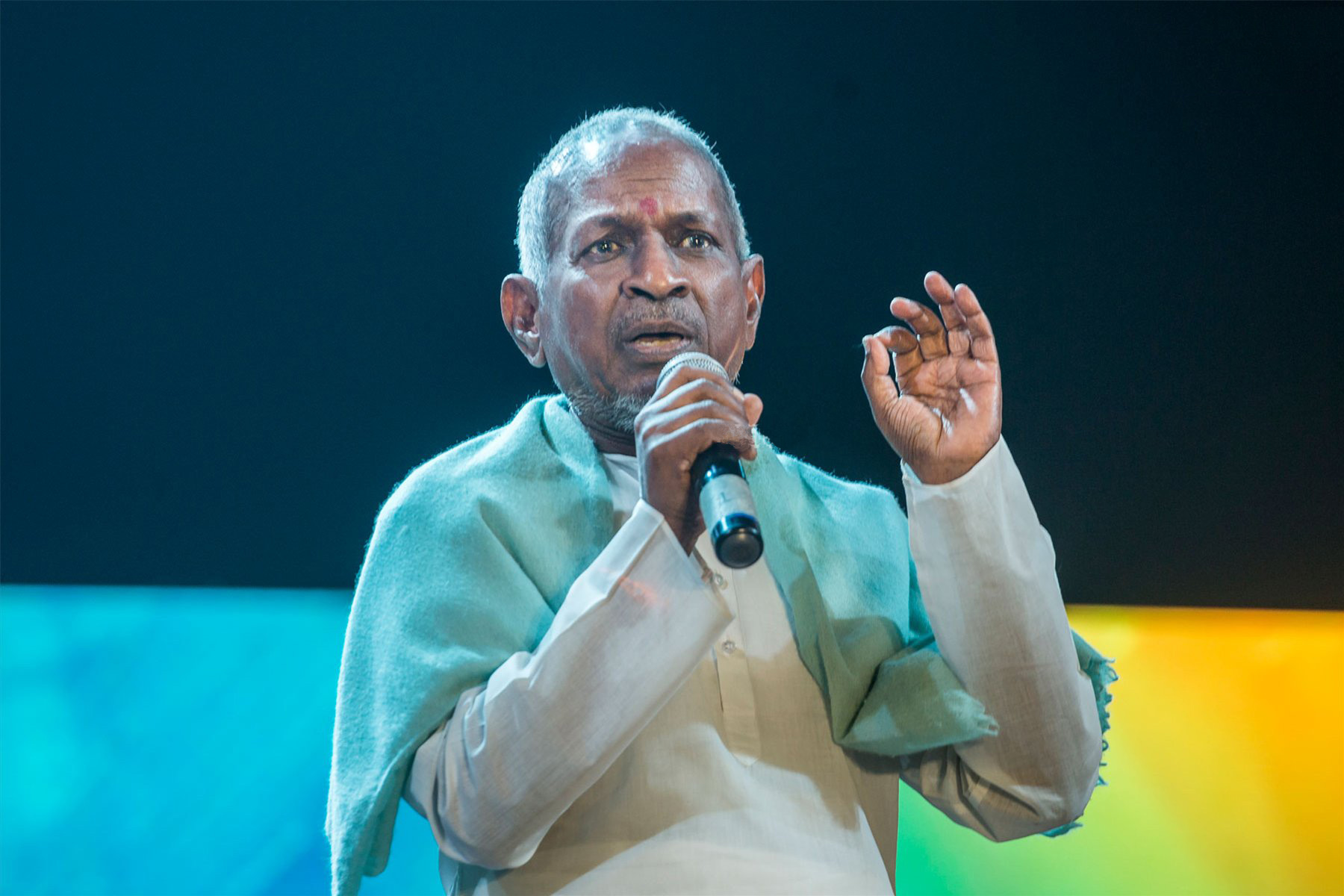
- Ilaiyaraaja at the TFPC Press Meet
| Awards & nominations |
| Award | Won | Nominated |
| Filmfare Awards South | 5 | 13 |
| Kerala State Film Award | 3 | 3 |
| Nandi Awards | 5 | 5 |
| National Film Awards | 5 | 5 |
| Screen Awards | 1 | 1 |
| Tamil Nadu State Film Awards | 6 | 6 |
- Total number of wins and nominations
| Totals | 32 | 45 |

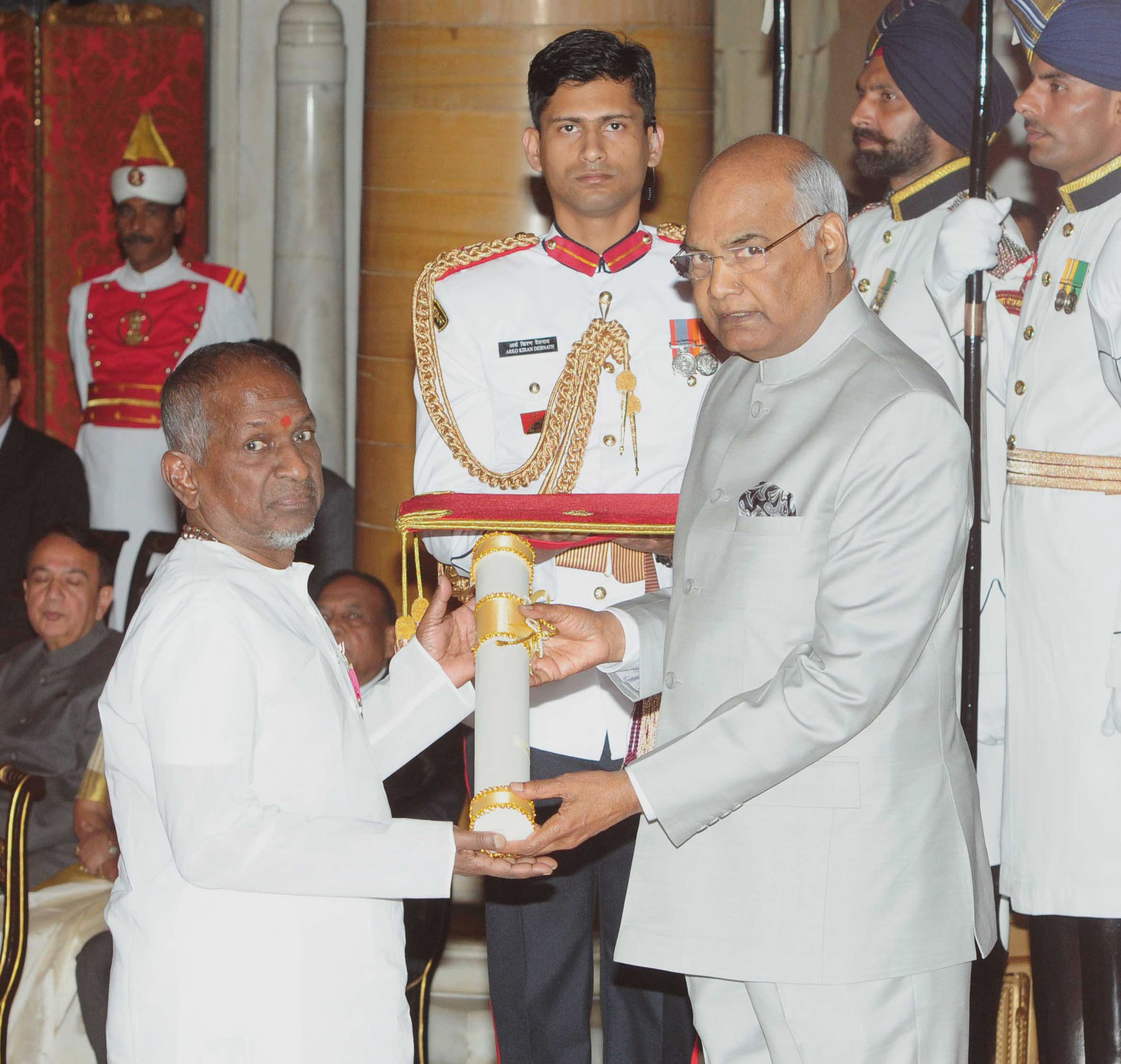
President of India, Ram Nath Kovind presenting the Padma Vibhushan Award to Ilaiyaraaja

Ilaiyaraaja is an Indian composer and instrumentalist who has worked in over 1000 films in various languages including Tamil, Telugu, Malayalam, Kannada, Hindi, English, Marathi, Sanskrit, Punjabi with majority of his works in the Tamil language and widely regarded as the greatest Indian music composer of all-time by various critics and experts.

Ilaiyaraaja has also worked as conductor and a songwriter. His songs and background score played a crucial role in the success of many of his films. He is widely regarded as one of the most popular composers in the South Indian film industry, and also in the list of world's top selling music artists. Making his debut through Annakili, a Tamil film in 1976, Ilaiyaraaja has been a prominent composer of film music in South Indian cinema since the late 1970s. He integrated folk lyricism (in Tamil) and introduced broader Western musical sensibilities into the South Indian musical mainstream. A gold medalist in classical guitar from Trinity College of Music, London in 1993 he became the first Asian to compose a full symphony performed by the Royal Philharmonic Orchestra in London's Walthamstow Town Hall. In 2010, he was bestowed upon Padma Bhushan, the third highest civilian honour and the Padma Vibhushan in 2018, the second highest civilian honour by the Government of India.

Ilaiyaraaja has won the National Film Award for Best Music Direction for the Tamil film Sindhu Bhairavi (1986) and the Telugu films Rudraveena (1989) and Saagara Sangamam (1984). He won three Best Composer awards during the 1980s at the National Film Awards (India). In 2010, Ilaiyaraaja won the National Film Award for Best Background Score for Malayalam film Pazhassi Raja. He also won the Gold Remi Award for Best Music Score jointly with film composer M. S. Viswanathan at the World Fest-Houston Film Festival for his work in the film Vishwa Thulasi in 2005. In 2015, he was also honoured with the Centenary Award for lifetime achievement at the 46th International Film Festival of India (IFFI) at Panaji, Goa.

He was conferred the title Isaignani (transl. Savant of Music) in 1988 by Tamil Nadu Chief Minister M. Karunanidhi and also received the Kalaimamani award, an annual award for excellence in the field of arts from the Government of Tamil Nadu. He also received State Government Awards from the governments of Tamil Nadu, Kerala (1994, 1995, 1998), Andhra Pradesh (1981, 1988, 1990) and Madhya Pradesh (The Lata Mangeshkar Award) (1998) for excellence in music. He is also a recipient of the NTR National Award in 2004. Alongside he also won the Akshaya Samman of the year (2010), a prestigious musical award from Orissa for his outstanding contribution in the field of music.

Ilaiyaraaja was awarded honorary doctorates by Annamalai University, Tamil Nadu, India (Degree of Doctor of Letter (Honoris causa)) (1994), the World University Round Table, Arizona, U.S.A. (Cultural Doctorate in Philosophy of Music) (April 1994), and Madurai Kamaraj University, Tamil Nadu (Degree of Doctor of Letters) (1996). He received an award of appreciation from the Foundation and Federation of Tamil Sangams of North America (1994), and later that year was presented with an honorary citizenship and key to the Teaneck township by John Abraham, Mayor Teaneck. In a 2003 BBC International poll, more than half-a million people from 165 countries voted his composition "Rakkamma Kaiya Thattu" from the 1991 film Thalapathi as fourth in the world's top 10 most popular songs of all time. Ilayaraja was honoured with Sachin Dev Burman International award for creative music and sound in January 2012.

He was also nominated in the Best Indian album Music Awards category at US based Just Plain Folks Music Organization, which is the largest grassroots music organization in the world, and stood third for his "Music Journey: Live in Italy". In 2014, he has been chosen for his outstanding contribution to the Indian film music and was awarded the SIES Sri Chandrasekarendra Saraswati National Eminence award. On December 31, 2015, he was nominated by the Kerala Government for Nishagandi Puraskaram, the top award conferred by the Kerala Government's Tourism Ministry, for his artistic excellence and contributions to the Indian film industry. In 2020, the annual Harivarasanam Award, jointly instituted by the Kerala state government and the Travancore Devaswom Board (TDB), was presented to Ilaiyaraaja.

== Civilian honours ==
| Year | Award | Honouring body | Ref |
|---|---|---|---|
| 2018 | Padma Vibhushan | Government of India | |
| 2010 | Padma Bhushan | Government of India | |

== National Film Awards ==
| Year | Film | language | Category | Outcome | Ref |
|---|---|---|---|---|---|
| 1983 | Saagara Sangamam | Telugu | Best Music Direction | Won | |
| 1985 | Sindhu Bhairavi | Tamil | Best Music Direction | Won | |
| 1988 | Rudra Veena | Telugu | Best Music Direction | Won | |
| 2009 | Pazhassi Raja | Malayalam | Best Background Score | Won | |
| 2015 | Tharai Thappattai | Tamil | Best Background Score | Won | |

== WorldFest-Houston International Film Festival ==
| Year | Film | Award | Outcome | Ref |
|---|---|---|---|---|
| 2005 | Vishwa Thulasi | Golden Remi Award | Won | |

== International Film Festival of India (IFFI) ==
| Year | Field | Award | Outcome | Ref |
|---|---|---|---|---|
| 2015 | Music | Centenary Award for Lifetime Achievement | Won | |

== Filmfare Awards South ==
| Year | Film | Language | Category | Outcome | Ref |
|---|---|---|---|---|---|
| 1989 | Filmfare Lifetime Achievement Award – South Contribution to Cinema | | | Won | |
| 1990 | Bobbili Raja | Telugu | Best Music Director | Won | |
| 1991 | Thalapathi | Tamil | Best Music Director | Won | |
| 2001 | Kasi | Tamil | Best Music Director | Nominated | |
| 2003 | Pithamagan | Tamil | Best Music Director | Nominated | |
| 2003 | Manassinakkare | Malayalam | Best Music Director | Won | |
| 2005 | Achuvinte Amma | Malayalam | Best Music Director | Won | |
| 2008 | Innathe Chintha Vishayam | Malayalam | Best Music Director | Nominated | |
| 2009 | Naan Kadavul | Tamil | Best Lyricist for the song 'Pitchai Pathiram' | Nominated | |
| 2009 | Bhagyadevatha | Malayalam | Best Music Director | Nominated | |
| 2010 | Kadha Thudarunnu | Malayalam | Best Music Director | Nominated | |
| 2011 | Sri Rama Rajyam | Telugu | Best Music Director | Nominated | |
| 2012 | Nee Thaane En Pon Vasantham | Tamil | Best Music Director | Nominated | |
| 2023 | Viduthalai Part 1 | Tamil | Best Music Director | Nominated | |

== Tamil Nadu State Government Awards ==
| Year | Award | Honouring body | Outcome | Ref |
|---|---|---|---|---|
| 1988 | Kalaimamani | Government of Tamil Nadu | Won | |

== Tamil Nadu State Film Awards ==
| Year | Film(s) | Category | Outcome |
|---|---|---|---|
| 1977 | 16 Vayathinile | Best Music Director | Won |
| 1980 | Nizhalgal | Best Music Director | Won |
| 1981 | Alaigal Oivathillai | Best Music Director | Won |
| 1988 | Agni Natchathiram | Best Music Director | Won |
| 1989 | Varusham Padhinaaru, Karagattakaran | Best Music Director | Won |
| 2009 | Ajantha | Best Music Director | Won |

== Kerala State Film Awards ==
| Year | Film | Category | Outcome | Ref |
|---|---|---|---|---|
| 1994 | Sammohanam | Best Background Music | Won | |
| 1995 | Kalapani | Best Music Director | Won | |
| 1998 | Kallu Kondoru Pennu | Best Background Music | Won | |

== Kerala State Government Awards ==
| Year | Award | Honouring body | Outcome | Ref |
|---|---|---|---|---|
| 2016 | Nishagandhi Puraskaram | Government of Kerala | Won | |
| 2020 | Harivarasanam Award | Government of Kerala and Travancore Devaswom Board | Won | |

== Screen Awards ==
| Year | Film | Category | Outcome |
|---|---|---|---|
| 2001 | Hey Ram | Best Background Music | Won |

== Nandi Awards (Andhra Pradesh State Government) ==
| Year | Film | Category | Outcome |
|---|---|---|---|
| 1981 | Seethakoka Chiluka | Best Music Director | Won |
| 1988 | Rudraveena | Best Music Director | Won |
| 1990 | Jagadeka Veerudu Athiloka Sundari | Best Music Director | Won |
| 2011 | Sri Rama Rajyam | Best Music Director | Won |
| 2012 | Yeto Vellipoyindhi Manasu | Best Music Director | Won |
| 2004 | Many movies | NTR National Award | Won |

== Norway Tamil Film Festival Awards ==
| Year | Film | Award | Outcome | Ref |
|---|---|---|---|---|
| 2011 | Azhagarsamiyin Kuthirai | Best Music Director | Won | |

== Sangeet Natak Akademi Award ==
| Year | Field | Category | Outcome | Ref |
|---|---|---|---|---|
| 2012 | Music | Creative and experimental music | Won | |

== South Indian International Movie Awards ==
| Year | Film | Category | Outcome |
|---|---|---|---|
| 2012 | Rama Rajyam | Best Music Director- Telugu | Nominated |
| 2013 | Neethane En Ponvasantham | Best Music Director- Tamil | Nominated |
| 2021 | Psycho | Best Music Director- Tamil | Nominated |
