= John Dhanraj =

Indian television host

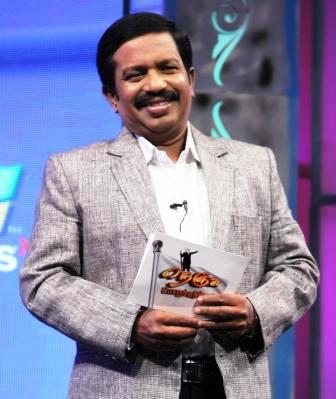
- Dhanraj hosting Nenju Porukkuthillaiye
- Born: John Dhanraj; Chennai District, Tamil Nadu, India
- Notable work: Host of Nenju Porukkuthillaiye

Comedy career
- Years active: 1992- present
- Medium: Television, Film
- Website: www.johndhanraj.com

John Dhanraj (Tamil:ஜான் தன்ராஜ்) is an Indian television host. He hosted DD Podhigai from 2010 to 2013. As of 2014 he is the host of Kalaignar TV's Nenju Porukkuthillaiye, which discusses social problems. He is the recipient of Edison Awards (India) for the best Anchor for Kaara Saram.

== Early life ==
Dhanraj was born in Chennai district Tamil Nadu, India. He pursued his law degree at Madras Law College, Chennai.

== Career ==
Dhanraj began his career in 1992 on the Sun TV (India) program kavidhai Kelungal, an on spot poem show. He later hosted kaara saram program(2010-2013) for DD Podhigai, a social awareness program. He is currently hosting Nenju Porukkuthillaiye, broadcast on Kalaignar TV.

== Lyricist ==
Dhanraj wrote several songs for the movie Manadhil our maargazhi (Tamil) and Lillies of March (Malayalam)

== Television works ==
| Title | Channel | Year |
|---|---|---|
| Kavidhai kelungal | Sun TV (India) | 1992 |
| Kaarasaram | DD Podhigai | 2010-2013 |
| Nenju Porukkuthillaiye | Kalaignar TV | 2013–present |
