= Thiruvasakam in Symphony =

2005 soundtrack album by Ilaiyaraaja

Soundtrack album by Ilaiyaraaja
- Released: 30 June 2005
- Genre: Oratorio
- Length: 1:04:11
- Language: Tamil
- Producer: Ilaiyaraaja

Thiruvasakam in Symphony (2005) is an oratorio composed and orchestrated by Ilaiyaraaja. Thiruvasagam is a collection of ancient Tamil poems written by Manikkavacakar. They were transcribed partially in English by American lyricist Stephen Schwartz. This is said to be the first Indian oratorio ever. It was performed by the Budapest Symphony Orchestra.

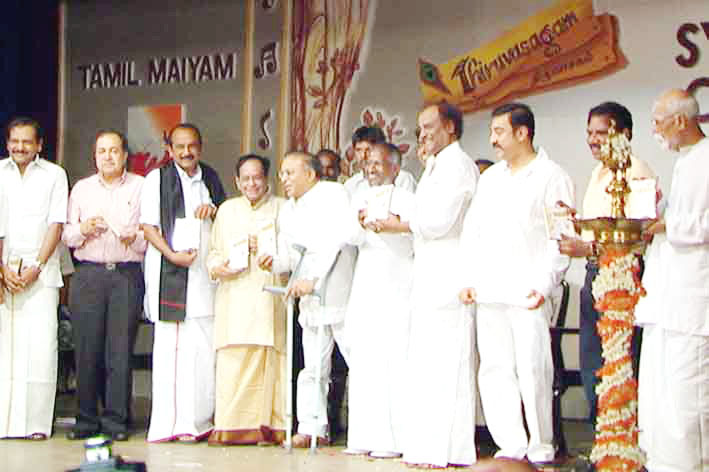
The Union Minister for Information & Broadcasting and Culture, Shri Jaipal Reddy releasing the CD of Ilayaraja's Thiiruvasagam Symphony in Chennai on June 30, 2005.

== Track listing ==
Track name	Singer(s)	Part of Thiruvasagam	Duration
Poovaar Senni Mannan	Ilaiyaraaja	From Yaatirai Pathu (யாத்திரைப் பத்து) - Thiruvasagam 45	8:17
Pollaa Vinayen	Ilaiyaraaja, Ray Harcourt & Chorus	From Sivapuranam (சிவபுராணம்) - Thiruvasagam 1	20:40
Pooerukonum Purantharanum	Ilaiyaraaja, Bhavatharini	From Thiruk-kothumbi (திருக்கோத்தும்பி) - Thiruvasagam 10	8:03
Umbarkatkarasaey	Ilaiyaraaja	From Piditha Pathu (பிடித்த பத்து) - Thiruvasagam 37	10:20
Muthunar Thalampoo	Unnikrishnan, Madhu Balakrishnan, Vijay Yesudas, Manjari, Asha, Gayathri & Chorus	From Thiruporchunnam (திருப்பொற் சுண்ணம்) - Thiruvasagam 9	8:04
Puttril Vazh Aravum Anjaen	Ilaiyaraaja	From Acchap Pathu (அச்சப்பத்து) - Thiruvasagam 35	8:47
