= Dhanraj Chandrasekaran =

South Indian bishop

The Right Reverend Dhanraj Chandrasekaran
- Bishop of Trichy-Tanjore
- Church: Church of South India
- Diocese: Trichy-Tanjore Diocese
- Installed: 2018

Dhanraj Chandrasekaran is an Anglican bishop in the Church of South India: he has been Bishop of Trichy-Tanjore since 2018.
