= Master Dhanraj =

- Origin: Mylapore, Chennai, Tamil Nadu, India
- Occupations: Music teacher, musician, instrumentalist

Master Dhanraj (also credited as Dhanraj Master) is an Indian musician, multi-instrumentalist from Tamil Nadu.

== Biography and career ==
Master Dhanraj is a famous and renowned music teacher in Madras (now Chennai). He has made musical research on the epic Silappatikaram. Orchestration for the grand Tamil movie Chandralekha was done by Dhanraj.

He is well known as the guru of greats such as Maestro Ilaiyaraaja, Mozart of Madras A. R. Rahman, and Thenisai Thendral Deva, The Melody King Vidyasagar, and Malayalam music director Shyam and Johnson. Veteran Chennai-based music teacher Mr. A. Abdul Sattar, who was the guru of music directors Harris Jayaraj, D. Imman, S. Thaman, and S. J. Suriya, and who won the Best Teacher Award from Trinity College, London for 25 consecutive years, was also a student of Dhanraj.

Ilaiyaraaja (previously known as Raasayya) joined Dhanraj Master as a student to learn musical instruments. At some point, Dhanraj Master restyled his name to Raaja.

He is famous for teaching Western classical music.

== Books ==
Bramma Mela Pramanam

Isai Vithi

180 Degree

== Acclaim ==
Dhanraj master was considered to be the bedrock of western music in Chennai. He was one of the trios who laid the foundation for Chennai becoming a hub of Western classical music.

Renowned students of Dhanraj includes,

Name
Ilaiyaraaja
Sankar Ganesh
A. R. Rahman
Vidyasagar
Shyam
Deva
Abdul Sattar
