= Ilaiyaraaja =

Indian composer and playback singer (born 1943)

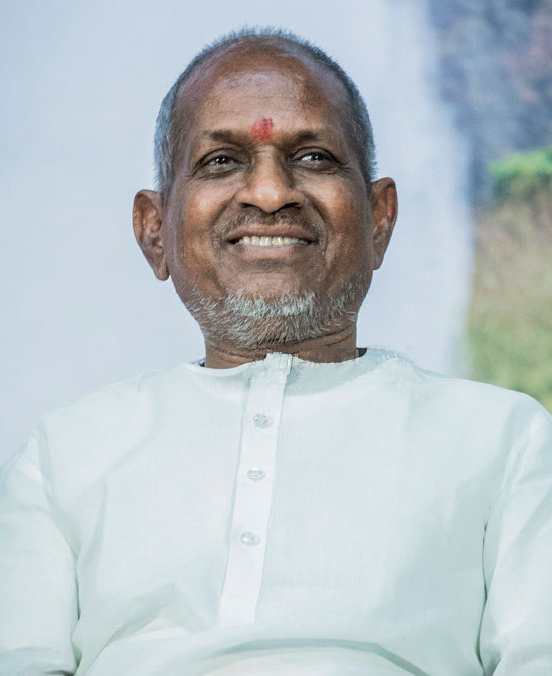
- Ilaiyaraaja in 2017

Background information
- Also known as: Isaignani; Maestro
- Born: Gnanathesigan; 3 June 1943 (age 83) (Note: Official date of birth of Ilaiyaraaja is June 3. As the birth dates of both Ilaiyaraaja and Karunanidhi fall on the same date i.e June 3, Ilaiyaraaja started celebrating it on June 2, so that people of Tamil Nadu can celebrate only that of Karunanidhi on June 3. This was done in honour of Karunanidhi who gave the title "Isaignani" to Ilaiyaraaja.); Pannaipuram, Madras Presidency, British India
- Education: Trinity Laban (Classical guitar)
- Genres: Film score; world music; classical; oratorio; folk; rock; jazz
- Occupations: Composer; arranger; conductor; orchestrator; instrumentalist; lyricist; playback singer; film producer
- Instruments: Vocals (playback singing); guitar; keyboard; harmonium; flute; synthesizer; organ; piano; violin; cello; mridangam; tabla; ghatam; drums
- Years active: 1976–present
- Website: ilaiyaraajalive.com

Member of Parliament, Rajya Sabha
- Incumbent
- Assumed office 7 July 2022
- Nominated by: Ram Nath Kovind
- Constituency: Nominated (Arts)

Personal details
- Spouse: Jeeva Rajayya
- Children: Bhavatharini; Karthik Raja; Yuvan Shankar Raja

Ilaiyaraaja (born Gnanathesigan; 3 June 1943) is an Indian musician, composer, arranger, conductor, orchestrator, multi-instrumentalist, lyricist, and playback singer. He is known for his works in Indian cinema, predominantly in Tamil in addition to Telugu, Malayalam, Kannada, and Hindi films. He is one of the most prolific composers, having composed over 6500 songs and provided film scores for nearly 1500 feature films in nine languages by 2025. He has also performed many concerts. He was one of the earliest Indian film composers to use Western classical music harmonies and string arrangements in Indian film music. He is nicknamed "Isaignani" (the musical sage) and is often referred to as "Maestro", the title conferred on him by the Royal Philharmonic Orchestra, London.

In 1986, he became the first Indian composer to record a soundtrack with computer for the film Vikram. In 2013, when CNN-IBN conducted a poll to commemorate 100 years of Indian cinema, Ilaiyaraaja secured 49% of the vote and was adjudged the country's greatest music composer. In 2025, he became the first-ever Asian, as well as Indian film composer, to compose, record, and perform live a full Western classical symphony in London. He also composed and orchestrated Thiruvasagam in Symphony (2006) - the first Indian oratorio.

Ilaiyaraaja has received several awards for his works throughout his career. In 2012, for his creative and experimental works in the field of music, he received the Sangeet Natak Akademi Award, the highest Indian recognition given to people in the field of performing arts. In 2010 he was awarded the Padma Bhushan, the third-highest civilian honour in India, and in 2018 the Padma Vibhushan, the second-highest civilian award by the government of India. He is a nominated Member of Parliament in the Indian upper house, the Rajya Sabha, since July 2022.

== Early life and education ==
Ilaiyaraaja was born as Gnanathesigan in Pannaipuram, at present-day Theni district in Tamil Nadu, India, on 3 June 1943. He however celebrates his birthday on 2 June to honour "Kalaignar" M. Karunanidhi, whose birthdate also is on 3 June. It was "Kalaignar" M.Karunanidhi who gave Ilaiyaraaja the title "Isaignani".

Ilaiyaraaja grew up in a rural area and was exposed to a range of Tamil folk music in his formative years. At the age of 14, he joined a travelling musical troupe named "Pavalar Brothers", headed by his elder brother Pavalar Varadharajan, and spent the next decade performing across South India. While working with the troupe, he penned his first composition, a musical adaptation of an elegy written by the Tamil poet laureate, Kannadasan, for India's first prime minister Jawaharlal Nehru. In the initial years he used to set tunes to the songs of his brother Pavalar Varadarajan, who was a member of the Communist Party of India.

He later went to Madras (now Chennai) along with brother Bhaskar to learn music. They had only 400 rupees, which their mother had procured by selling off the home radio. They knew no one in the city and were confident to live off the payments they would receive by singing for people on the streets.

In Madras, he became a student of Master Dhanraj, who trained him in classical music. Ilaiyaraaja emerged as the top student and a gold medalist in classical guitar after taking an exam at the Trinity College of Music in London, England. He also learnt Carnatic music from T. V. Gopalakrishnan.

=== Name changes ===
When he started school, his father, Daniel Ramasamy changed his name from Gnanathesigan to "Rasappa," and the people in his village called him "Raasaiya".

When he joined Dhanraj Master as a student to learn musical instruments, the master changed his name from "Raasaiya" to "Raja". While working for his first film Annakili (1976), Tamil film producer Panchu Arunachalam added the prefix "Ilaiya" (meaning 'younger' in Tamil) to the name "Raaja", and renamed him as "Ilaiyaraaja", as in the 1970s there was another popular music director with the same suffix, A. M. Rajah.

== Career ==
=== Session musician and orchestrator ===
During the 1970s, Ilaiyaraaja played the guitar in a band-for-hire, and worked as a session guitarist, keyboardist, and organist for film music composers and directors such as Salil Chowdhury from West Bengal. Chowdhury once remarked that "[Ilaiyaraaja] is going to become the best composer in India". "Our main guitarist in Madras is the best composer in India", he said. After being hired as musical assistant to Kannada film composer G. K. Venkatesh, he worked on 200 film projects, mostly in Kannada cinema. As Venkatesh's assistant, Ilaiyaraaja would orchestrate the melodic outlines developed by Venkatesh, and learn about composing under Venkatesh's guidance. During this period, Ilaiyaraaja also began to write his own scores. To listen to his compositions, he used to persuade Venkatesh's session musicians to play excerpts from his scores during their leisure time.

=== Film score composer ===
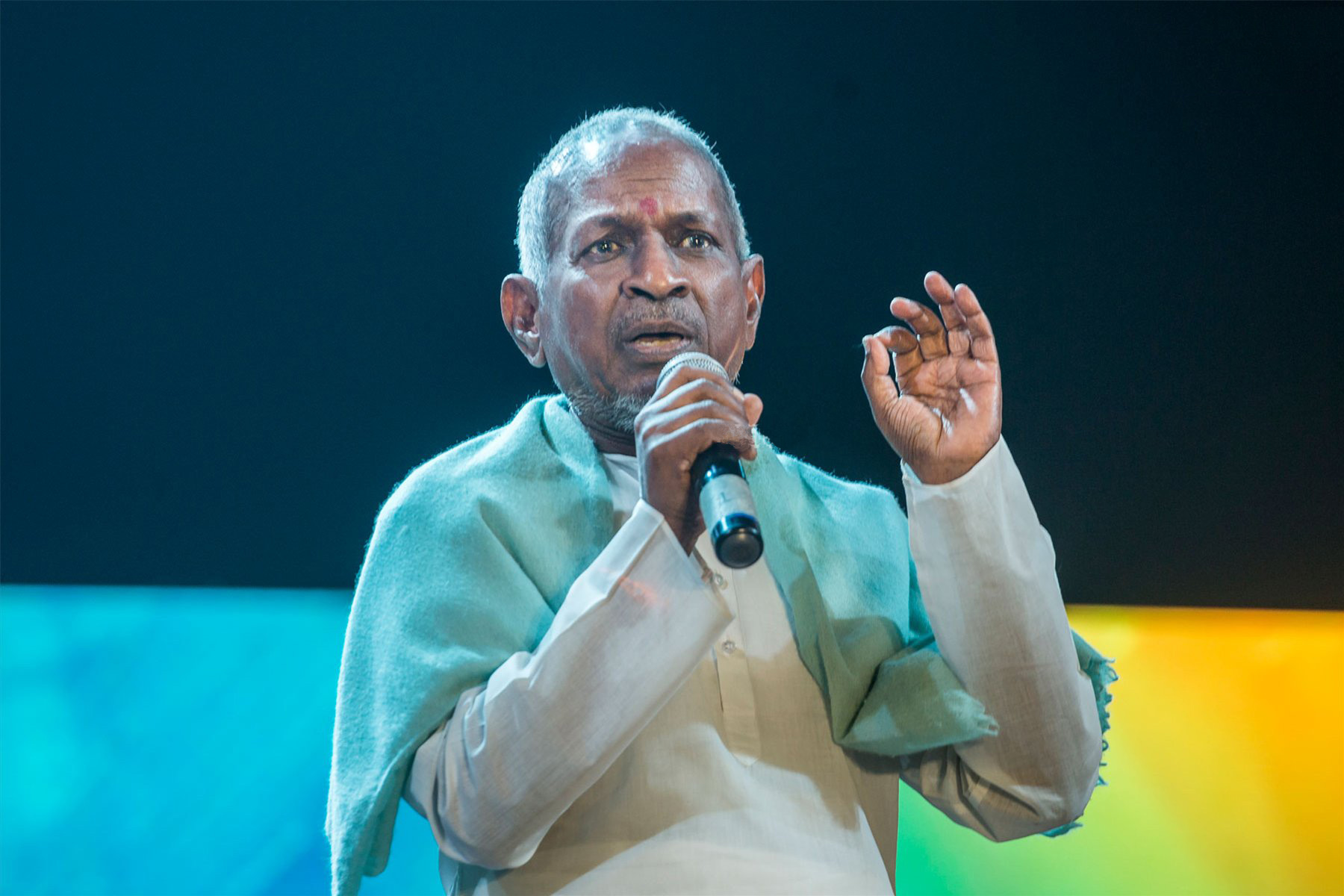
Ilaiyaraaja at the TFPC Press Meet

At the start of his career, the music sensibility of Ilaiyaraaja was very different to the film music composed in those days. Even though he spent a lot of his time learning, he "wasn't able to grasp how music was being made for films." However, in 1975 when film producer Panchu Arunachalam was impressed by a song Ilaiyaraaja casually sung, he commissioned him to compose the songs and film score for the Tamil film Annakili (1976). For the soundtrack, Ilaiyaraaja applied techniques of modern popular film music orchestration to Tamil folk poetry and folk song melodies. This resulted in creation of a fusion of Western and Tamil idioms. Initially he was little apprehensive about how his work would be received, he thought musicians in the industry may write him off. However, when Annakili released in 1976, the music became a huge hit. For his following 12 films, Ilaiyaraaja based his compositions on the contemporary film music. Later, when a new wave of films started to come, they opened the space for the kind of music he wanted to explore.

Ilaiyaraaja's use of Tamil folk music in his film scores injected new life in the Indian film score milieu. By the mid-1980s, he started gaining increasing stature as a composer and music director in the South Indian film industries. He worked with Indian poets and lyricists such as Kannadasan, Vaali, Vairamuthu, O. N. V. Kurup, Sreekumaran Thampi, Veturi, Acharya Aatreya, Sirivennela Seetharama Sastry, Chi. Udayashankar and Gulzar. Most of his compositions were sung by S. P. Balasubrahmanyam, S. Janaki and K. S. Chithra.

=== Non-cinematic output ===
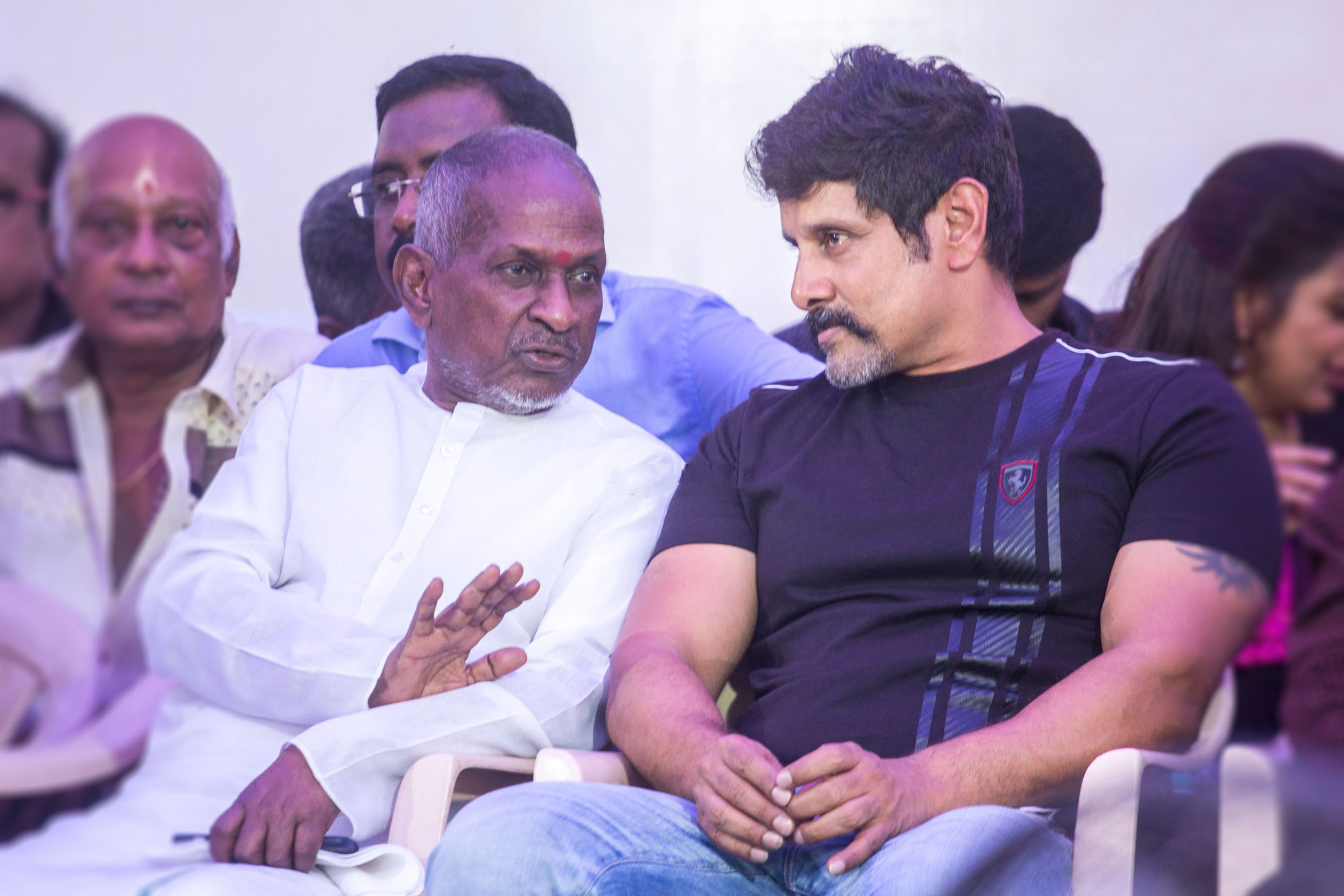
Ilaiyaraaja and Vikram at the Nadigar Sangam Protest

Ilaiyaraaja's first two non-film albums were explorations in the fusion of Indian and Western classical music. The first, How to Name It? (1986), is dedicated to the Carnatic master Tyāgarāja and to J. S. Bach. It features a fusion of the Carnatic form and ragas with Bach partitas, fugues and Baroque musical textures. The second, Nothing But Wind (1988), was performed by flautist Hariprasad Chaurasia and a 50-piece orchestra and takes the conceptual approach suggested in the title—that music is a "natural phenomenon akin to various forms of air currents".

He has also composed a set of Carnatic kritis which were recorded by electric mandolinist U. Srinivas for the album Ilayaraaja's Classicals on the Mandolin (1994), as well as albums of religious/devotional songs. His Guru Ramana Geetam (2004) is a cycle of prayer songs inspired by the Hindu mystic Ramana Maharshi, and his Thiruvasakam: A crossover (2005) is an oratorio of ancient Tamil poems transcribed partially in English by American lyricist Stephen Schwartz and performed by the Budapest Symphony Orchestra. His most recent release is a world music-oriented album called The Music Messiah (2006). In 2025, he became the first Asian to debut a western classical symphony in London, alongside the Royal Philharmonic Orchestra. Entitled Valiant, the symphony was also recorded by the Royal Scottish National Orchestra under conductor Mikel Toms.

In May 2020, he composed a song titled "Bharath Bhoomi" in tribute to people working amid the COVID-19 pandemic. It was performed by S. P. Balasubrahmanyam. A video for the song was released on Ilaiyaraaja's YouTube channel on 30 May 2020, in Tamil and Hindi.

On his birthday in 2020, Ilaiyaraaja announced the upcoming launch of his 'Isai OTT' app. He stated that the app would contain much more than just his songs, like behind-the-scenes trivia about how each song was conceived, produced, and delivered, as well as collaborations with other musicians.

Ilaiyaraaja's song "Naanthaan Ungappanda" from the 1981 film Ram Lakshman was part of the playlist for the opening ceremony of the 2012 Summer Olympics.

His compositions "Paayum Puli Title Music" and "Ilamai Itho" were part of the soundtrack of Ashim Ahluwalia's 2012 Cannes Film Festival entry, Miss Lovely. A section of "Oru Kili" from Ilaiyaraaja's soundtrack for Aanandha Kummi (1983) was featured in the trailer of The Lovebirds (2020).

Ilaiyaraaja's music has been sampled a number of times, particularly by hip-hop artists. The Black Eyed Peas sampled "Unakkum Ennakum" from Sri Raghavendra (1985) for the song "The Elephunk Theme" on their 2003 album Elephunk. Meek Mill sampled one of Ilaiyaraaja's songs for "Indian Bounce". Alternative artist M.I.A. sampled "Kaatukuyilu" from the film Thalapathi (1991) for her song "Bamboo Banga" on the album Kala (2007). "Mella Mella Ennaithottu" from Vaazhkai was sampled by Rabbit Mac on the song "Sempoi". Gonjasufi sampled "Yeh Hawa Yeh Fiza" from the movie Sadma on his song "Sheep".

=== Live performances ===
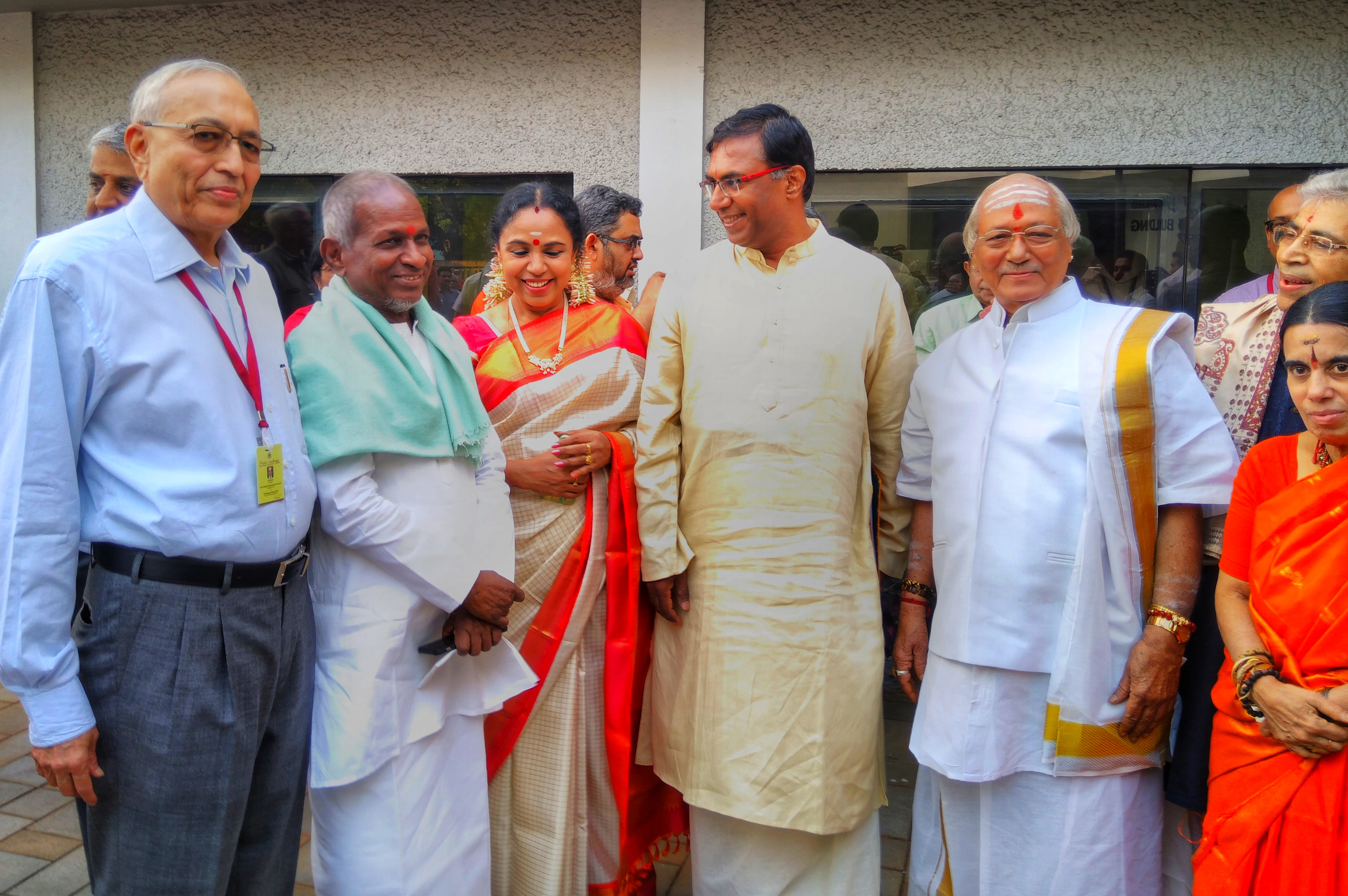
Ilaiyaraaja at the inauguration of 91st Music Academy Concerts & Conferences

His first major live performance since his debut was a four-hour concert held at the Jawaharlal Nehru Indoor Stadium in Chennai, India, on 16 October 2005. He performed in 2004 in Italy at the Teatro Comunale di Modena, an event-concert presented for the 14th edition of Angelica, Festival Internazionale Di Musica, co-produced with the L'Altro Suono Festival.

A television retrospective titled Ithu Ilaiyaraja ("This is Ilaiyaraja") was produced, chronicling his career. He last performed live at the audio release function of the film Dhoni and before that, he performed a programme that was conducted and telecasted by Jaya TV titled Enrendrum Raja ("Everlasting Raja") on 28 December 2011 at Jahawarlal Nehru Indoor Stadium, Chennai.

On 5 September 2012, Ilayaraja performed in a live concert in Chennai with the Hungarian National Philharmonic orchestra; during this event the music launch of his films Neethaane En Ponvasantham and Yeto Vellipoyindhi Manasu took place. On 23 September 2012, he performed live in Bangalore at National High School Grounds.

On 16 February 2013, Ilayaraja made his first appearance in North America performing at the Rogers Centre in Toronto, Canada. The Toronto concert was promoted by Trinity Events for Vijay TV in India and produced by Sandy Audio Visual SAV Productions with PA+. Following his show at Toronto, Ilaiyaraaja also performed at the Prudential Center Newark, New Jersey, on 23 February 2013 and at the HP Pavilion at San Jose on 1 March 2013. After his North America tour, he made a live performance at The O2 Arena in London on 24 August 2013, along with Kamal Haasan and his sons Yuvan Shankar Raja and Karthik Raja.

== Musical style and sensibility ==
"Only the film director will be with me when the situation and the story are narrated. Then, it's just me and my harmonium. I just think about the situation and touch my harmonium and music flows. If people consider it as an alternate world, so be it. To me, it is something that I can't explain."

— Ilaiyaraaja on his creative process

Ilaiyaraaja, once reflecting over his works after turning seventy-five, said his "life experiences and learning" have been the fountain from which his musical output poured, but sometimes felt that some of his compositions transcended them as if they were "the reflection of the efforts of past lives — mine, or those of other musical exponents." When enquired if it was mystical as in the case of mathematical genius Srinivasa Ramanujan, who insisted he received math formula in dreams from a goddess, Ilaiyaraaja said that unlike Ramanujan who felt a supernatural being guiding him, he always felt a moment of clarity when a composition came to his mind — "It is as if I am the subject and the object of art at the same time when that happens," he said. Nevertheless, he regards music as a form of spiritual seeking, where one needs to keep their "inner eye constantly open", but also assist it with vigorous work, "In my early years, I would be in the studio till 11 pm. Come home, have bath and dinner, and write music till 2 am. I would wake up by 4, sit down to do my music and be at the studio at sharp 7 am. Music is everything to me. Do you know it took me 27 years to understand the C major chord on the piano", he said.

Ilaiyaraaja uses the same harmonium, both in his studio and in concerts. He has scored with it throughout his career. When he was younger, he was never allowed to touch it by his brother who thought he would spoil it. However, Ilaiyaraaja would play with it whenever his brother was not there, "that's how I learnt how to play," he said, "the harmonium knows that it was made for me. It tells me that there is more music to be made." The harmonium was reportedly bought for eighty-five rupees.

Ilaiyaraaja's musical style is characterised by an orchestration which is a synthesis of Indian folk music and Western classical music, with traditional Indian instruments and modes. He uses electronic music technology that integrates synthesizers, electric guitars and keyboards, drum machines, rhythm boxes and MIDI with large orchestras that feature traditional instruments such as the veena, venu, nadaswaram, dholak, mridangam and tabla as well as Western lead instruments such as saxophones and flutes. When asked to explain what his music is, Ilaiyaraaja said, "How can I explain anything? Everyone’s music is made of their own life experiences. To me music is that which connects human hearts. It is something that takes you to unknown levels."

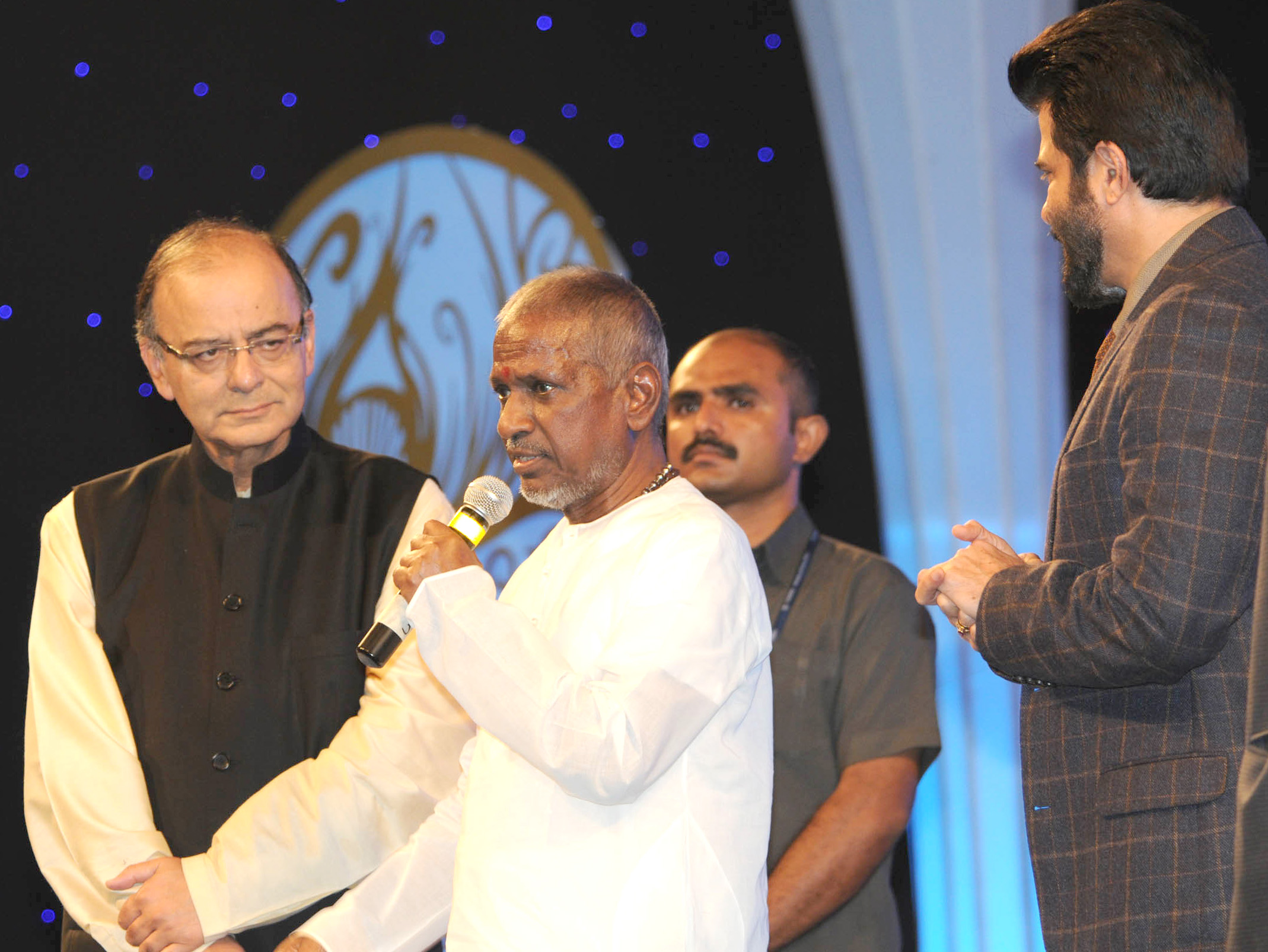
Ilaiyaraaja speaking after receiving the centenary award at the 46th International Film Festival of India (IFFI-2015), in Panaji, Goa

On numerous occasions, Ilaiyaraaja has credited M. S. Viswanathan as an overwhelming influence on his music. "I could be a music director only by closely watching and listening to the great techniques introduced by M.S. Viswanthan in film music", he said. Ilaiyaraaja first played the organ for the song Malar Ethu Kankal Than in the film Avalukendru Or Manam for MSV. He later worked on composing background music for few of his films. Along with M.S. Viswanthan, he called Naushad, Roshan, Madan Mohan, and G.K. Venkatesh among several others, as the "great masters". Lata Mangeshkar and S. Janaki had been the singers with whom he experimented his songs relentlessly.

Ilaiyaraaja is nicknamed "Isaignani" (the musical sage), a title conferred by Kalaignar Karunanidhi. He is often referred to as "Maestro", the title conferred by the Royal Philharmonic Orchestra, London. He was one of the earliest Indian film composers to use Western classical music harmonies and string arrangements in Indian film music. This allowed him to craft a rich tapestry of sounds for films, and his themes and background score gained notice and appreciation among Indian film audiences. The range of expressive possibilities in Indian film music was broadened by his methodical approach to arranging, recording technique, and his drawing of ideas from a diversity of musical styles.

According to musicologist Paul Greene, Ilaiyaraaja's "deep understanding of so many different styles of music allowed him to create syncretic pieces of music combining very different musical idioms in unified, coherent musical statements". By virtue of this variety and his intermingling of Western, Indian folk and Carnatic elements, Ilaiyaraaja's compositions appeal to the Indian rural dweller for its rhythmic folk qualities, the Indian classical music enthusiast for the employment of Carnatic ragas, and the urbanite for its modern, Western-music sound. His sense of visualisation for composing music is always to match up with the movie storyline and help the audience feel the emotions flavoured through his musical score. He mastered this art of blending music to the narration, which very few others managed to adapt themselves over a longer time. Although he uses a range of complex compositional techniques, he often sketches out the basic melodic ideas for films in a very spontaneous fashion.

== Honours and legacy ==
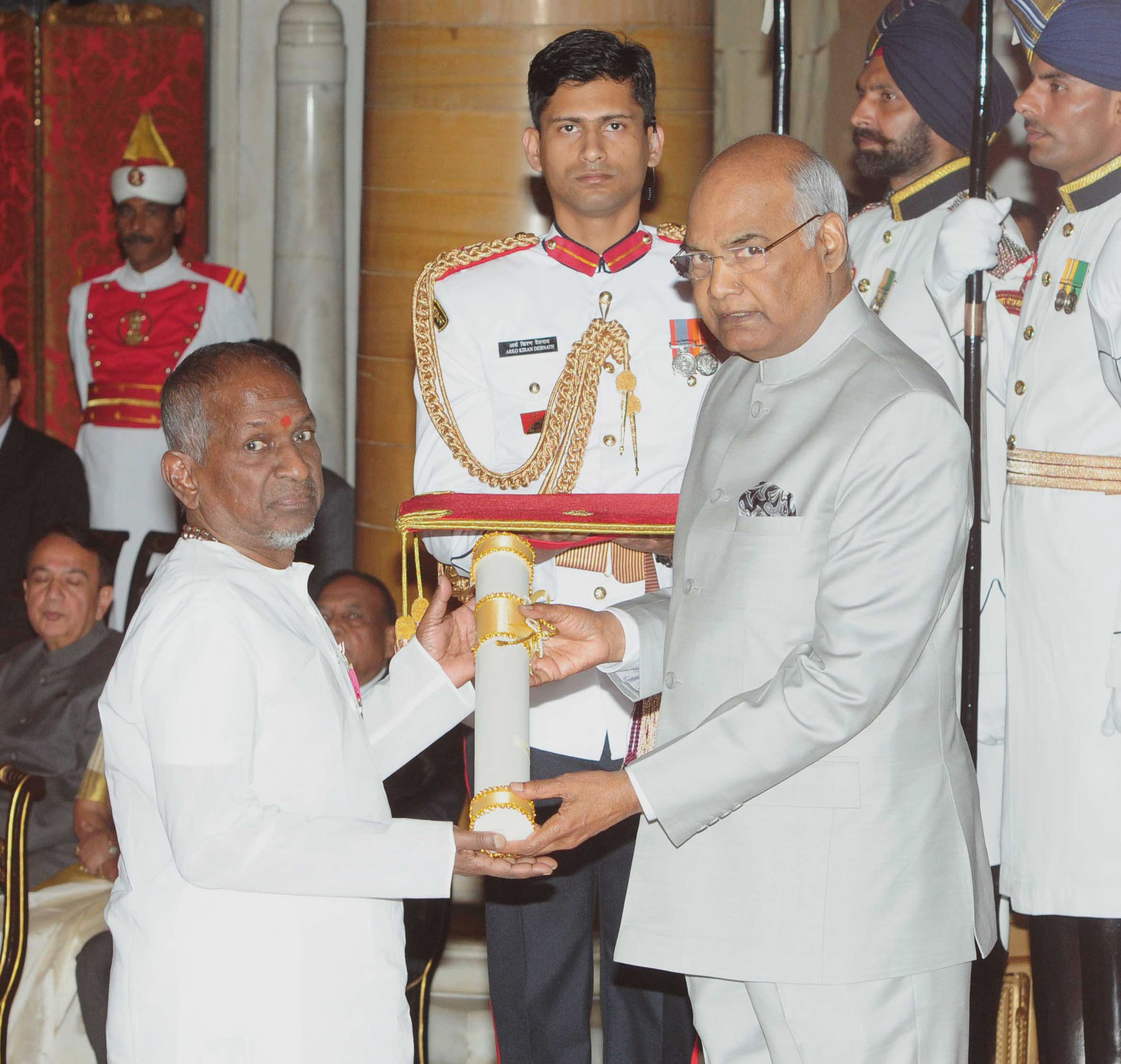
Ilaiyaraaja receiving the Padma Vibhushan from President Ram Nath Kovind

In 2010, Ilaiyaraaja was awarded the Padma Bhushan, the third-highest civilian honour in India and the Padma Vibhushan in 2018, the second-highest civilian award by the government of India. On 6 July 2022, Ilaiyaraaja was nominated to the Rajya Sabha as Member of Parliament by the President of India, Ram Nath Kovind. In November 2022, Prime Minister Narendra Modi conferred an honorary doctorate to Ilaiyaraaja during the 36th Convocation Ceremony of Gandhigram Rural Institute in Tamil Nadu's Dindigul.

Ilaiyaraaja has been awarded five National Film Awards—three for Best Music Direction and two for Best Background Score. In 2012, he received the Sangeet Natak Akademi Award, the highest Indian recognition given to practising artists, for his creative and experimental works in the music field. He is a gold medalist in classical guitar from Trinity College of Music, London. In 2013, when the Indian news channel CNN-IBN conducted a poll commemorating 100 years of Indian cinema, he secured 49% of the people's vote and was adjudged as the country's greatest music composer; A. R. Rahman stood second with 29% of the vote.

Ilaiyaraaja is reputed to be one of the world's most prolific composers. He composed more than 8,600 songs, provided film scores for about 1,523 movies in nine languages, and performed in over 20,000 concerts. He is the only musician to have composed a song only in ascending notes. He was one of the earliest Indian film composers to use Western classical music harmonies and string arrangements in Tamil film music. He composed the score and soundtrack for the 1984 Malayalam-language film My Dear Kuttichathan, the first stereoscopic 3D film made in India. In 1986, he became the first Indian composer to record a soundtrack with computer for the film Vikram. He composed the soundtrack for the movie Nayakan (1987), an Indian film which was ranked by Time magazine as one of the all-time 100 best movies. Director R. K. Selvamani said that for his film Chembaruthi (1992), Ilaiyaraaja composed nine songs in just 45 minutes which is a record. Actor Rajinikanth said Ilaiyaraaja used to complete the re-recording of three films in a single day without any sleep, whereas the present-day generation composers take 30 days for a single film.

On 9 March 2025, Ilaiyaraaja became the first-ever Indian, as well as Asian, film composer to compose, record, and perform live a full Western classical symphony in London. He had reportedly written the entire symphony in 34 days. He also composed and orchestrated Thiruvasakam in Symphony (2006), the first Indian oratorio. With his work over decades, Ilaiyaraaja made a deep influence on the cultural landscape of Southern India.

Achille Forler, board member of the Indian Performing Right Society, said in 2017, "the kind of stellar body of work that Ilaiyaraaja has created in the last 40 years should have placed him among the world's top 10 richest composers, somewhere between Andrew Lloyd Webber ($1.2 billion) and Mick Jagger (over $300 million)."

British musician Andy Votel, described Ilaiyaraaja in an essay thus, "Whatever "genre" of music you choose to like/ love/ promote/ protect/ politicise/ over-intellectualize/ despise/ defend or pretend to enjoy, Ilaiyaraaja has done it." Carnatic vocalist T. M. Krishna stated that no other film composer has displayed the broad range of understanding music like the way Ilaiyaraaja did, and the way he adapts himself and creates music is "unfathomable" making him the "absolute master". G. K. Venkatesh, one of the earliest mentors of Ilaiyaraaja, remarked on his success thus: "He is not in awe of his creations. That is the secret of his success. An Ilaiyaraja song is overshadowed only by another Ilaiyaraja song."

Ilaiyaraaja's soundtrack for the 1991 film Thalapathi was included in The Guardian's 100 Albums to Hear Before You Die. In 2003, according to an international poll conducted by BBC of more than half-a million people from 165 countries, his composition "Rakkamma Kaiya Thattu" from Thalapathi was voted fourth in the top 10 most popular songs of all time. Cinematographer Santosh Sivan said that Ilaiyaraaja finished composing for the entire soundtrack of the film Thalapathi in less than "half a day". During the recording for the song "Sundari" from the movie Thalapathi in Mumbai with R.D. Burman's orchestra, when Ilaiyaraaja gave the notes, they were so moved and taken in by the composition that all the musicians put their hands together in awe and gave him a standing ovation as a mark of respect.

== Personal life ==
Ilaiyaraaja was married to Jeeva. With her, he has two sons, Karthik Raja and Yuvan Shankar Raja, and a daughter, Bhavatharini, all film composers and singers. Jeeva died on 31 October 2011, Bhavatharini died of liver cancer on 25 January 2024.

Ilaiyaraaja's brother, Gangai Amaran, is also a music director and lyricist in the Tamil film industry. The two were engaged in a 13-year feud until reconciling in February 2022.

Ilaiyaraaja's was born and raised in Hinduism, and regards the Tamil Hindu sage Ramana Maharshi as his spiritual guru.

== Legal issues and controversies ==
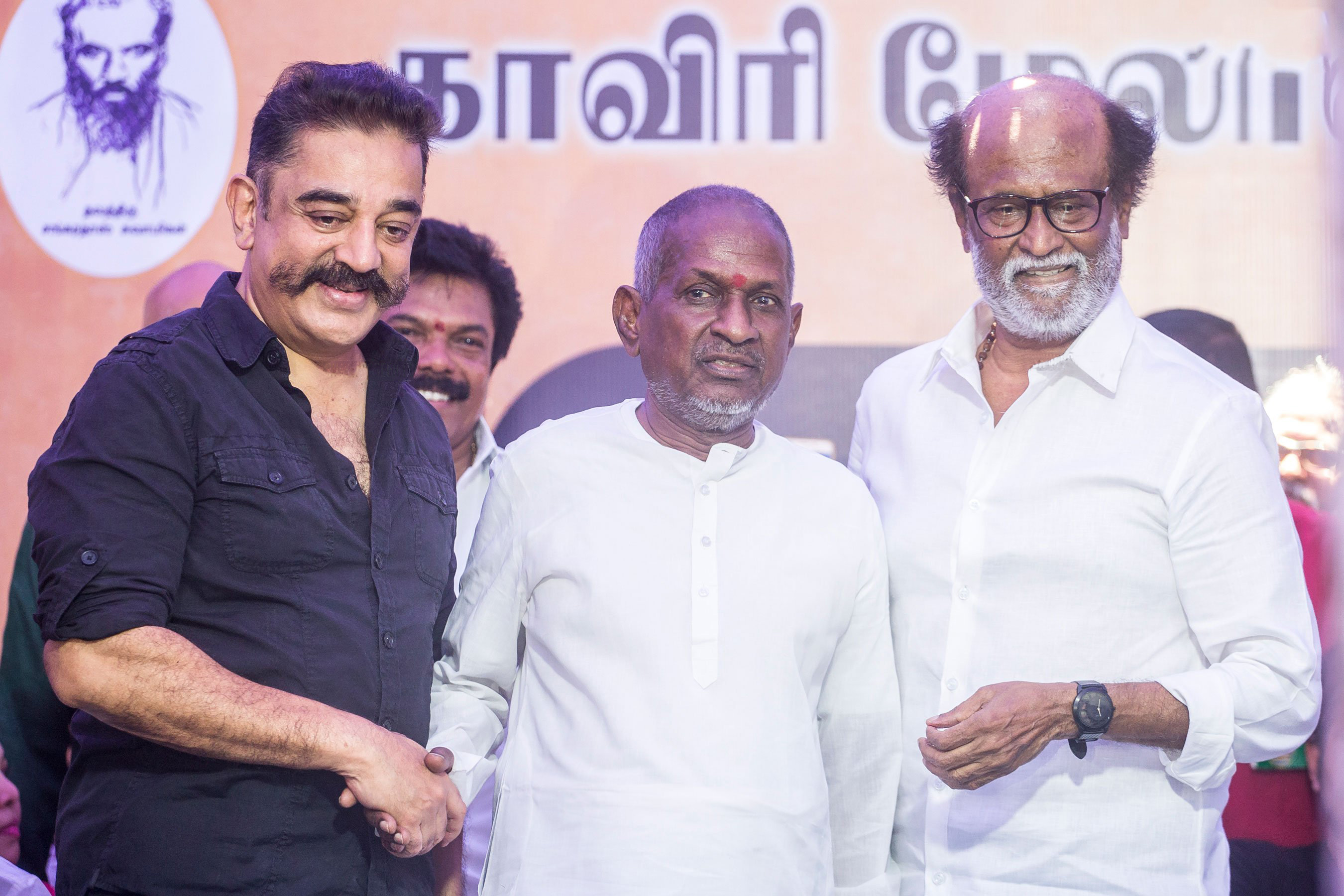
Ilaiyaraaja (center) with Kamal Haasan (left) and Rajinikanth (right) at the Nadigar Sangam Protest in 2018

In 2017, claiming copyright violations, Ilaiyaraaja sent legal notices to singers, S. P Balasubrahmanyam, his son S. P. Charan and Chithra, prohibiting them from singing his compositions without his consent, and warned they would have to pay huge royalties and face legal action if they do so. Ilaiyaraaja's brother Gangai Amaran criticised him, saying legal notice to SPB is 'foolishness'.

In 2018, during a talk show in the US, Ilaiyaraaja expressed his doubts regarding the credibility of the Christian belief in the Resurrection of Jesus Christ and claimed that resurrection happened only in the case of the Hindu saint Ramana Maharshi. He is reported to have said, "I regularly watch documentaries on Youtube. It is said that Jesus was not resurrected". In protest, a Christian group lodged a complaint with the Police Commissioner of Tiruchi, demanding police action against Ilaiyaraaja, or an apology from him, for raising doubt about the "ultimate belief of Christians".

In early 2022, while talking about the state of music composers in industry, Ilaiyaraaja said, "There are no composers in the film industry today; there are only programmers."

In April 2022, Ilaiyaraaja triggered a controversy by writing a foreword in the book titled, "Ambedkar & Modi—Reformer's Ideas", in which he praised Indian Prime Minister Narendra Modi and compared him to the celebrated anti-caste activist B.R. Ambedkar. He was criticised by anti-caste activists and politicians who alleged that "Ambedkar worked for the uplift of the downtrodden and oppressed castes, and Ilaiyaraaja's comparison was an insult to Ambedkar".

== Discography ==
Ilaiyaraaja 1970s	Ilaiyaraaja 1980s	Ilaiyaraaja 1990s	Ilaiyaraaja 2000s	Ilaiyaraaja 2010s	Ilaiyaraaja 2020s	New / Non-Film

== See also ==
- List of songs recorded by Ilaiyaraaja
