= Goundamani and Senthil =

Indian comedic in Tamil cinema

- Notable work: Vaidehi Kathirunthal, Karakattakkaran, Gentleman

Comedy career
- Years active: 1983–2003
- Genres: Slapstick, comedy
- Former members: Goundamani; Senthil

Goundamani and Senthil were an Indian comedic duo who were popular in Tamil cinema in the 1980s and 1990s. The duo was active for twenty years. After the mid-2000s, they started acting in films separately and less frequently with Goundamani notably becoming a hero in the mid-2010s while Senthil continued to act in supporting roles.

== Career ==
Starting in the 1980s, Goundamani and Senthil emerged as a notable comedic duo and were compared with Laurel and Hardy. Their jokes involved a senior-junior chemistry with Goundamani taking on the former roles and Senthil taking the latter role. Much of their comedy was "loud" and ended with Senthil being insulted for his dimwitted characters. Many films ran at the box office simply due to this duo's comedic tracks, making them a staple of 1980s and 1990s Tamil films.

=== Notable comedic sequences ===
- In Vaidehi Kathirunthal (1984), a woman with a basket comes to the All-in-All Azhagu Raja roadside shop (owned by Goundamani) asking for a petromax light. After hearing this, Senthil runs off. Goundamani in response asks' "Petromax lightey venumaa?" (Do you want only the petromax light?) and reprimands the woman saying that he cannot sell the light to people with baskets.
- In Karakattakkaran (1989), Senthil goes to buy two bananas for one rupee. When he returns to Goundamani with one of the two bananas after eating the other one, Goundamani asks him where the other banana is, and Senthil replies to him by saying that the other banana is this one. This scene is dubbed as the vazhapazham (transl. banana) scene. In the same film, there is another comedy scene involving the troupe members pushing the Chevrolet Impala, where Goundamani's character says that this is the car owned by cinema actress Soppana Sundari. Curious Senthil asks a question in Goundamani's ear, which triggers him to slap Senthil repeatedly, asking, "Adhu yenda enna paathu andha kelvi keta?" (Why did you ask me that question?) Furious with Senthil for asking him and not the other members, Goundamani reveals the question when Ramarajan asks why Goundamani is hitting Senthil repeatedly; the question Senthil asked Goundamani was, "Car-ah namma vachirukkurom, indha car-ah vachirundha Soppana Sundari-ya ippa yaaru vachirukkaanga?" (We have the car that once belonged to Soppana Sundari. Now, who keeps Soppana Sundari?)
- In Chinna Gounder (1992), Senthil keeps questioning Goundamani like a village vingnani (transl. scientist) on random things, making him angry and prompting him to kick Senthil away. One such scene involves Senthil asking why river water tastes good while the same water tastes salty when it reaches the sea. He also asks about the terminology for fruits, such as why tender mango is called maangaai and ripe mango is called maambazham, while tender coconut is called ilani (இளநீ) and coconut is called thengaai. Goundamani responds sarcastically saying "Nee sonna vaakkiyatha, Thanjavur kovil kalvettu-la vetti vachittu, pakkathula nee utkanthukka, unakku pinnaala vara santhathigal atha paathu padichu, thelivaa nadanthukkuvaanga" (You should engrave the words you spoke on the Tanjore temple walls and sit beside it, so the future generations coming after you will read it and live wisely). In another scene, Senthil claims to have found the reason for the term "Pul thadukki bayilvan" while holding a grass. He breaks its blade and says it's half, then breaks it again and says it's a quarter. Goundamani responds by taking another grass, breaking it, and saying it's arai (½) while slapping Senthil, then breaks it further and says it's kaal (¼) before kicking him, prompting Senthil to run away. In a different scene, Senthil asks about hair terminology, wondering why facial hair can't be called muga mudi like head hair is called thalai mudi. Later, when both of them see Suganya and Manorama arguing, Senthil becomes frightened by Manorama's teeth when she smiles. Goundamani teases Manorama, saying "Aattha, nee sirikkaatha aattha, kuzhanthai payappududhu!" (Maa! Please don't smile, kid is frightened!)
- In Gentleman (1993), Senthil argues with Goundamani and argues that Goundamani shouldn't look down at him because he passed 7th standard and Goundamani failed to get an SSLC. Senthil argues that passing is better than failing although Goundamani is indeed smarter than him. Senthil says, "Less tension, more work. More work, less tension!"
- In Jaihind (1994), Goundamani plays Head Constable Kottaisamy, who gets into trouble due to Senthil's character. Senthil appears in Goundamani's dreams, causing him to unwittingly harm himself or others.

== Selected filmography ==
- Note: Only films that feature Goundamani and Senthil comedy tracks are listed. Any film that features both of them in separate scenes are omitted.

| Year | Title | Goundamani Role | Senthil Role | Notes and Ref. |
|---|---|---|---|---|
| 1983 | Malaiyoor Mambattiyan | 'Silk' Singaram | Bullet | |
| 1983 | Aanandha Kummi | Villager | Karuvaaya | |
| 1984 | Naan Paadum Paadal | Surya Kumar | Laundryman | |
| 1984 | Neram Nalla Neram | Villager | Roadside restaurant owner | |
| 1984 | Vaidehi Kathirunthal | All-in-All Azhagu Raja | Komutti Thalaiya | |
| 1985 | Rajathi Rojakili | Soora Thevar | Patta Sombu | |
| 1985 | Mannukketha Ponnu | Vishamurukki Veluchamy | Ammavasai | |
| 1985 | Kanni Rasi | Gopikrishna | Lakshmipathi's friend | |
| 1985 | Udaya Geetham | Balaji | Senthil | |
| 1985 | Naane Raja Naane Mandhiri | Kuppusamy | Naakuthuruthi | |
| 1985 | Anbin Mugavari | Villagers | | |
| 1985 | Idaya Kovil | Logidhasan Bhagavathar | Logidhasan Bhagavathar's assistant | |
| 1985 | Karaiyai Thodadha Alaigal | Barbers | | |
| 1985 | Marudhani | School Teacher | Dingu | |
| 1985 | Thendral Thodatha Malar | | | |
| 1985 | Geethanjali | Horse owner | | |
| 1986 | Karimedu Karuvayan | Villagers | | |
| 1986 | December Pookal | Mestri Mayilsamy | Senthil Kumaran | |
| 1986 | Rasigan Oru Rasigai | | | |
| 1986 | Dharma Pathini | "Podhuppani" Ponnusaami | Ponnusaami's sidekick | |
| 1986 | Maragatha Veenai | School headmaster | School clerk | |
| 1986 | Aayiram Pookkal Malarattum | | | |
| 1986 | Piranthaen Valarnthaen | Raja | | |
| 1986 | Mannukkul Vairam | Esakki | Sembattai | |
| 1986 | Paadum Paravaigal | | | A comedy track was reshot for this Tamil dubbed version of Anveshana (1985). |
| 1987 | Ninaive Oru Sangeetham | Chinnukaruppandevar | Gundulingam | |
| 1987 | Idhu Oru Thodar Kathai | | | |
| 1989 | Anbu Kattalai | | | |
| 1989 | Karakattakkaran | 'Thavil Vidhwan' Thangavelu | Naadhas | |
| 1989 | Manasukketha Maharasa | | | |
| 1989 | Enga Ooru Mappillai | Villagers | | |
| 1989 | Ninaivu Chinnam | Kundalakesi | Aandava | |
| 1989 | Pen Puthi Mun Puthi | | | |
| 1989 | Raaja Raajathan | | | |
| 1989 | Thangamana Raasa | Subaiya (Subramani) | Alagusundaram | |
| 1989 | Mundhanai Sabatham | | | |
| 1990 | Paattali Magan | Dharmadi Dharmalingam | | |
| 1990 | Paattukku Naan Adimai | | | |
| 1990 | Thangathin Thangam | | | |
| 1990 | Neengalum Herothan | Pavadaikanth | | |
| 1990 | Ulagam Pirandhadhu Enakkaga | 'Suthi' Josiyar | | |
| 1990 | Periya Idathu Pillai | | | |
| 1990 | Madurai Veeran Enga Saami | 'Balloon' Kandasamy | Balusamy | |
| 1990 | Ooru Vittu Ooru Vanthu | Captain Tamil Arasu | Tamil Arasu's assistant | |
| 1990 | Patanathil Petti | | | |
| 1990 | Puthu Paatu | Palanisamy | Muthu | |
| 1990 | Namma Ooru Poovatha | 'Everything' Ekambaram | Ekabaram's sidekick | |
| 1991 | Naadu Adhai Naadu | | | |
| 1991 | Naan Pudicha Mappillai | Thandavarayan | Konaiyan | |
| 1991 | En Rasavin Manasile | Pannaiyar | | |
| 1991 | Adhikari | | | |
| 1991 | Marikozhundhu | Building constructor | Building constructor's assistant | |
| 1991 | Cheran Pandiyan | Mechanic Manikkam | Thangam | |
| 1991 | Vaidehi Kalyanam | Pachamuthu | Thangamuthu | |
| 1991 | Oorellam Un Paattu | | | |
| 1991 | Thambi Oorukku Pudhusu | | | |
| 1991 | Thalattu Ketkuthamma | Rasaiya's uncle | Pulipandi | |
| 1991 | Nenjamundu Nermaiyundu | | | |
| 1991 | Pondatti Sonna Kettukanum | Dharmalingam | Villager | |
| 1992 | Chinna Gounder | Vellai | Ammavasai | |
| 1992 | Pandithurai | Mayilsamy | Chola | |
| 1992 | Thilagam | Singamuthu | | |
| 1992 | Chinna Thayee | Villagers | | |
| 1992 | Periya Gounder Ponnu | Palanisamy | | |
| 1992 | Sivantha Malar | Maaran | | |
| 1992 | Thanga Manasukkaran | Guitarist | Sundal | |
| 1992 | Therku Theru Machan | Villagers | | |
| 1992 | Chinnavar | Villagers | | |
| 1992 | Chinna Pasanga Naanga | 'Kuwait' Govind | Villager | |
| 1992 | Oor Mariyadhai | 'Miner' Mahadevan | Villager | |
| 1992 | Idhuthanda Sattam | Karuppan | | |
| 1992 | Thaali Kattiya Raasa | Tea stall owner | Tea stall employee | |
| 1992 | Magudam | Thanni Samy | Manasthan | |
| 1992 | Pattathu Raani | Jalagandeswaran | Rayappan | |
| 1992 | David Uncle | Kavundar | Panniraj | |
| 1992 | Onna Irukka Kathukanum | Sudalai | Pichumani (Beggar Bell) | |
| 1992 | Villu Pattukaran | Appakannu | Thangappan | |
| 1992 | Natchathira Nayagan | 'Detective' Thiruvasagam | Thiruvasagam's assistant | |
| 1993 | Koyil Kaalai | Ramasamy | Villager | |
| 1993 | Rakkayi Koyil | Singaram | Barber | |
| 1993 | Manikuyil | | Chinna Gounder | |
| 1993 | Ejamaan | Vellaiyangiri | Azhagiri | |
| 1993 | Maharasan | Govindan | Sangu Pillai | |
| 1993 | Amma Ponnu | | Nallathambi | |
| 1993 | Uthama Raasa | Ondippulithevar | Vellayathevan | |
| 1993 | Ponnumani | Naachi | Villager | |
| 1993 | Porantha Veeda Puguntha Veeda | Ravi's Father | Mohana's husband | |
| 1993 | Band Master | Mani | Albert | |
| 1993 | Dharma Seelan | Aarusamy | Dindigul Sahayam | |
| 1993 | Gentleman | Mani | Babloo | |
| 1993 | Thalattu | Goundar | Goundar's brother-in-law | |
| 1993 | Dhuruva Natchathiram | | | |
| 1993 | Chinna Jameen | Thalaiyari Mama | Vellasamy | |
| 1993 | Kattabomman | 'Supervisor' Subramani | Pazhani | |
| 1993 | Rojavai Killathe | David | T.V.Thandavarayan | |
| 1994 | Sethupathi IPS | Muthaiya | Alagappan | |
| 1994 | Rajakumaran | Marusamy | Postman | |
| 1994 | Varavu Ettana Selavu Pathana | 'Anjatha Singam' Marugupandi | Rahim | |
| 1994 | Seeman | Dawali | | |
| 1994 | Jai Hind | Kottaisamy | Kottaisamy's dream and DIG | |
| 1994 | Rasigan | Ekambaram | Kapooram | |
| 1994 | Mettupatti Mirasu | Gounder | Villager | |
| 1994 | Sathyavan | Kiruba | Mani | |
| 1994 | Thai Maaman | Rasappan's uncle | Villager | |
| 1994 | Jallikattu Kaalai | Aarusamy | Punnakku | |
| 1994 | Nattamai | Kaali Muthu and Mangalam | Thanga Muthu | |
| 1994 | Periya Marudhu | Sudalai | Azhaguraman | |
| 1994 | Nila | | Dinku | |
| 1994 | Thaai Manasu | Chokkalingam | Sakkarai | |
| 1995 | Naan Petha Magane | K. D. Varadarajan | | |
| 1995 | Veluchami | Kathavarayan | Kannan | |
| 1995 | Muthu Kaalai | Pattayakarar | | |
| 1995 | Muthukulikka Vaariyala | Kondakara Annachi | Mandaikaarar | |
| 1995 | Raja Enga Raja | Raja | | |
| 1995 | Coolie | Periyasamy/Velusamy/Madasamy | Ponnusamy/Munusamy/Munusamy's son | |
| 1995 | Karnaa | Khalnayak | Driver | |
| 1995 | Lucky Man | Yamadharmarajan | Chitragupta | |
| 1995 | Chinna Vathiyar | Astrologer | Astrologer's friend | |
| 1995 | Murai Maman | Perusu | Chinna Thambi | |
| 1995 | Thamizhachi | Villangam | Villager | |
| 1995 | Marumagan | Govindsamy | | |
| 1995 | Thedi Vandha Raasa | Albert Kothandam | Selvam | |
| 1995 | Nadodi Mannan | Ponnusamy | | |
| 1995 | Periya Kudumbam | Post Master | Postman Dhandapani | |
| 1995 | Mr. Madras | Govindsamy | Ponnusamy | |
| 1995 | Ragasiya Police | Ponnurangam | Harichandran | |
| 1995 | Maa Manithan | Mr. Dinar / Vettiyan | | |
| 1995 | Murai Mappillai | Ramesh | Suresh | |
| 1995 | Mannai Thottu Kumbidanum | Desingu | Tyre (Rajadhi Raja Raja Maarthanda Raja; Gambeera Raja Kulothunga Kathavaraya; Krishna Kamaraj) | |
| 1996 | Coimbatore Mappillai | Gopal | White | |
| 1996 | Parambarai | Karuppusamy | Kanayiram | |
| 1996 | Ullathai Allitha | 'Great' Vasu | Viswanathan's manager | |
| 1996 | Maha Prabhu | Sethu | Vicky | |
| 1996 | Nattupura Pattu | Kattamuthu | Chinna Karuppan | |
| 1996 | Indian | Subbaiah | Panneerselvam | Senthil reprises his role in Sathyam (2008). |
| 1996 | Pudhu Nilavu | Taxi Driver | | |
| 1996 | Katta Panchayathu | Toddy man | Chinna Thambi | |
| 1996 | Avathara Purushan | 'Pickpocket' Periyasamy | | |
| 1996 | Poovarasan | Govind | Samuthiram | |
| 1996 | Parivattam | | | |
| 1996 | Senathipathi | Kathavarayan | Veera Bahu | |
| 1996 | Gnanapazham | Aarthi's brother | Azhagu | |
| 1997 | Nesam | Narasimman | Thanikachalam | |
| 1997 | Pudhayal | | | |
| 1997 | Vallal | Sithappu | Azhagan | |
| 1997 | Aahaa Enna Porutham | Villager | Jack-an-Jill | |
| 1997 | Janakiraman | Villagers | | |
| 1997 | Rettai Jadai Vayasu | Vijay's uncle | Pangali | |
| 1998 | Aval Varuvala | Dhandapani | Michael Jackson | |
| 1998 | En Uyir Nee Thaane | 'Bullet' Jackie | Nicolas | |
| 1998 | Bhagavath Singh | | | |
| 1999 | Suriya Paarvai | Raj Bharath / Nattamai | Pichai Perumal / Sundaram | |
| 1999 | Ethirum Puthirum | Auto Driver | Eshwar | |
| 1999 | Azhagarsamy | Villagers | | |
| 2000 | Veeranadai | Ulagavaayan | Villager | |
| 2000 | Kannan Varuvaan | Thannirmalai/Athiyapatham/Ezhumalai | Sooravali | |
| 2000 | Kannaal Pesavaa | Clinton | Nelson Mandela | |
| 2001 | Vedham | Govindsamy | | |
| 2001 | Samuthiram | Ramanathan | M. Dharmaraj | |
| 2001 | Azhagana Naatkal | Ranjith | Mahali | |
| 2002 | Samasthanam | Selvam | Mani | |
| 2003 | Chokka Thangam | Muthu's uncle | Servant | |
| 2003 | Yes Madam | Ganesh Kumar | Arvind Swamy | |

== Failed comeback ==
In 2019, a sequel to Karakattakkaran (1989) entered pre-production. However, notably Goundamani was not cast despite Senthil being cast. The film, however, did not reach fruition due to Gangai Amaran's other commitments.

== Legacy ==
A similar comedic duo arose in Telugu cinema in the 1990s consisting of Kota Srinivasa Rao and Babu Mohan starting from the film Mamagaru (1991), which was a remake of Naan Pudicha Mappillai (1991). Kota Srinivasa Rao and Babu Mohan also dubbed for Goundamani and Senthil, respectively, in the Telugu dubbed versions of their films.
