= Gautami filmography =

Gautami Tadimalla is an Indian actor, costume designer, and producer who works mainly in Tamil and Telugu films. She has also acted in Malayalam, Hindi, and Kannada films. She is a costume designer and won the 2008 Vijay Award for Best Costume Designer for her work on the Tamil movie Dasavatharam.

== Films ==
Year	Title	Role	Language	Notes
1987	Dayamayudu		Telugu	Cameo appearance
1987	Gandhinagar Rendava Veedhi	Geetha	Telugu	Debut in a lead role
1987	Elu Suttina Kote	Rani	Kannada	Debut film in Kannada
1987	Srinivasa Kalyanam	Saroja	Telugu	
1988	Guru Sishyan	Inspector Geetha	Tamil	Debut film in Tamil
1988	Bazaar Rowdy	Manga	Telugu	
1988	Bharya Bharthalu	Janaki	Telugu	
1988	Prudhviraj	Lalitha	Telugu	
1988	Thodallullu	Aruna	Telugu	
1988	Sahasa Veera		Kannada	
1988	Enga Ooru Kavalkaran	Poovayi	Tamil	
1988	Raththa Dhanam	Lakshmi	Tamil	
1988	Namma Ooru Nayagan	Revathi	Tamil	
1988	Kalicharan	Gowthami	Tamil	
1988	August 15 Raatri		Telugu	
1988	Prachanda Bharatam		Telugu	
1988	Puthiya Vaanam	Meri	Tamil	
1989	Vaai Kozhuppu	Radha	Tamil	
1989	Krishnagari Abbayi		Telugu	
1989	Pillaikkaga	Priya	Tamil	
1989	Pongi Varum Kaveri	Kaveri	Tamil	
1989	Enga Ooru Mappillai	Panjavarnam	Tamil	
1989	Apoorva Sagodharargal	Janaki	Tamil	
1989	En Thangai	Shenbagam	Tamil	
1989	Raja Chinna Roja	Sumathi	Tamil	
1989	Naan Sonnathey Sattam		Tamil	
1989	Pen Puthi Mun Puthi	Uma	Tamil	
1989	Raaja Raajathan	Radha	Tamil	
1989	Naqaab	Gowri	Hindi	
1989	Dharmam Vellum	Latha	Tamil	
1989	Rajanadai	Sumathi	Tamil	
1990	Panakkaran	Latha	Tamil	
1990	Anna Thammudu	Rani Padmini	Telugu	
1990	Vaazhkai Chakkaram	Kalyani	Tamil	
1990	Seetha	Jhansi Rani	Tamil	
1990	Ulagam Pirandhadhu Enakkaga	Jimikki	Tamil	
1990	Sandhana Kaatru	Rasathi	Tamil	
1990	Adhisaya Manithan	Ganga	Tamil	
1990	Ooru Vittu Ooru Vanthu	Panchavarnam	Tamil	
1990	Velai Kidaichuduchu		Tamil	
1990	Avasara Police 100	Anitha	Tamil	
1990	Adi 18		Tamil	
1990	Aggiramudu	Malli	Telugu	
1990	Neti Charitra	Rekha	Telugu	
1990	Bamma Maata Bangaru Baata	Seetha	Telugu	
1990	Namma Ooru Poovatha	Poovatha	Tamil	Tamil Nadu State Film Award Special Prize
1990	His Highness Abdullah	Radhika	Malayalam	Debut film in Malayalam
1990	Raja Kaiya Vacha	Vijaya	Tamil	
1990	Vazhnthu Kattuvom	Kannamma	Tamil	
1990	Vidhyarambham	Bhanumathi	Malayalam	
1991	Dharma Durai	Parvathi Dharmadurai	Tamil	
1991	Theechatti Govindhan	Geetha	Tamil	
1991	Aboorva Naagam		Tamil	
1991	Adhikari	Ponni	Tamil	
1991	Eashwari	Meenakshi	Tamil	
1991	Nallathai Naadu Kekum	Seetha	Tamil	
1991	Rudhra	Rudhra	Tamil	
1991	Kaaval Nilayam	Aarthi	Tamil	
1991	Nee Pathi Naan Pathi	Nivedha	Tamil	Filmfare Award for Best Actress – Tamil
1991	Chaitanya	Padmini	Telugu	
1991	Pyar Hua Chori Chori	Radha	Hindi	Debut film in Hindi
1992	Rickshaw Mama	Lakshmi	Tamil	
1992	Brahmachari	Malathi	Tamil	
1992	Sivantha Malar	Prabha	Tamil	
1992	Periya Gounder Ponnu	Manjula	Tamil	
1992	Thilagam	Thilagam	Tamil	
1992	Ponnuketha Purushan	Kalpana	Tamil	
1992	Naane Varuven	Thangam	Tamil	
1992	Magudam	Thilagavathi	Tamil	
1992	Pattathu Raani	Usha	Tamil	
1992	Mapillai Vandhachu	Yamuna	Tamil	
1992	Chikkejamanru	Kavitha	Kannada	
1992	Thevar Magan	Bhanumathi	Tamil	
1992	Ayalathe Adheham	Sulochana	Malayalam	
1992	Daddy	Ammu	Malayalam	
1992	Chakravyuham		Telugu	
1993	Athma	Divya	Tamil	
1993	Gentleman	Herself	Tamil	Special appearance In The Song Chikku Bukku Rayile
1993	Chinna Kannamma	Gayathri	Tamil	
1993	Airport	Uma	Tamil	
1993	Dear Brother		Telugu	
1993	Sankalpam	Rukmani	Telugu	
1993	Aadmi	Rekha Saxena	Hindi	
1993	Dhruvam	Mythili	Malayalam	
1993	Jackpot	Amritha	Malayalam	
1993	Aagneyam	Shoba Menon	Malayalam	
1993	Senthoorapandi	Marikozhundhu	Tamil	
1994	Anna	Saratha	Telugu	
1994	Oru Vasantha Geetham	Uma	Tamil	
1994	Sathyavan	Bhuvaneswari	Tamil	
1994	Honest Raj	Abinaya	Tamil	
1994	Nammavar	Vasanthi	Tamil	
1994	Janta Ki Adalat	Police inspector Jothi	Hindi	
1994	Teesra Kaun	As herself	Hindi	Guest Appearance
1994	Sukrutham	Malini	Malayalam	
1994	Chukkan	Gayathri	Malayalam	
1994	Palleturi Mogudu	Jothi	Telugu	
1995	Kuruthipunal	Sumithra	Tamil	
1995	Witness	Priya	Tamil	
1995	Veer	Anu	Hindi	
1995	God and Gun	Sujatha Singh	Hindi	
1995	Trimurti	Jothi	Hindi	
1995	Sakshyam	Sussena	Malayalam	
1996	Aayiram Naavulla Ananthan	Radhika	Malayalam	
1996	Drohi		Telugu	
1996	Adirindayya Alludu		Telugu	Special appearance
1997	Cheluva	Moha	Kannada	
1997	Iruvar	Ramani	Tamil	
1997	Chilakkottudu	Gowthami	Telugu	
1997	Dhaal	Sneha Saxena	Hindi	
1997	Vaachalam	Radha	Malayalam	
1998	Iniyavale	Dancer	Tamil	
2003	Varum Varunnu Vannu	Samyuktha Varma	Malayalam	
2006	Sasanam	Visalakshi	Tamil	Production since the 90's
2015	Papanasam	Rani Suyambulingam	Tamil	Tamil Nadu State Film Award for Best Character Artiste (Female) Nominated, Filmfare Award for Best Actress – Tamil
2016	Manamantha	Gayathri	Telugu	Bilingual film
2016	Vismayam	Gayathri	Malayalam	Bilingual film
2017	E	Malathi Menon	Malayalam	
2023	Shaakuntalam	Gowthami	Telugu	
2023	Anni Manchi Sakunamule	Meenakshi	Telugu	
2023	Skanda	Manikanda Lakshmi	Telugu	
2023	Krishna Rama	Krishnaveni	Telugu	
2024	Simbaa		Telugu	
2024	Mr. Bachchan	Basanti	Telugu	
2024	35	Saratha	Telugu	
2026	Ustaad Bhagat Singh	Bhagat Singh’s adoptive mother	Telugu	
2026	Maa Inti Bangaaram	Kamakshi	Telugu	

== Television ==
=== Actress ===
Web Series

- Story of Things (Sony LIV Originals) Segment: Cellular (2023)
- Kumari Srimathi (Amazon Prime Video) (2023)

TV serials

- Abirami (Kalaignar TV) as Abhirami/Saranya/Nandha; 2010
- Nenjathai Killadhe (Zee Tamil) as Herself; 2024
- Manasellam as Chitradevi; 2025

Reality shows as Judge

- Dance Jodi Dance (Zee Tamil)
- Dance Jodi Dance (season 2) (Zee Tamil)

=== Director ===
Serials

- Chinna Chinna Aasai (1997) (Sun TV) - Directed the story "Vanna Vanna Pookkal"

Other shows as Guest

- Badai Bungalow (Asianet)
- Onnum Onnum Moonu (Mazhavil Manorama)
- Laughing Villa (Surya TV)
- Alitho Saradaga (ETV)

== Online show ==
- Anbudan Gautami Season 1&2 as Host and Season 3 (2021-Ongoing)
