= Uma Bharani =

Indian actress

- Born: Uma Bharani; India
- Occupations: Dubbing Artist, Actress, Dancer
- Years active: 1977–1990

Uma Bharani is an Indian actress who acts prominently in Tamil and Malayalam films. After acting only in a few films, she then started acting in Tamil serials. She is now a dubbing artist in Tamil movies and serials. Her mother was T. R. Latha, who was a famous stage actress. She started her film career in Aanandam Paramaanandam. She also gave voice to the Hindi dubbed Tamil blockbuster serial Sindhu Bhairavi (Uttaran in Hindi), which was telecast on Raj TV. She gave voice to the character Sindhu (the lead role of this serial), and also to Mahathi (Sindhu's daughter).

== Filmography ==
=== As an actress ===
Year	Title	Role	Language	Notes
1977	Aanandam Paramaanandam		Malayalam	
1982	Kazhumaram	Indhu	Malayalam	
1983	Sandhyakku Virinja Poovu	Subhashini	Malayalam	
1983	Veena Poovu	Sumangala	Malayalam	
1983	Thaavalam	Amina	Malayalam	
1983	Mounaraagam	Sreedevi	Malayalam	
1983	Ashtapadi	Sreedevi	Malayalam	
1984	Oru Painkilikkadha	Thankam	Malayalam	
1984	Ithaa Innu Muthal	Sharada	Malayalam	
1984	Naan Mahaan Alla	Shanti	Tamil	
1984	Dhavani Kanavugal	Shanti	Tamil	
1985	Guruji Oru Vaakku	Latha	Malayalam	
1986	T. P. Balagopalan M. A.	Devi	Malayalam	
1986	Nandi Veendum Varika	Sarada	Malayalam	
1987	P.C. 369		Malayalam	
1990	Uchi Veyil	Shanti	Tamil	

=== As a dubbing artist ===
Tamil

Dubbed for	Films
Pallavi	Aruvadai Naal (1986) (Debut); Thangachi (1987); Dhayam Onnu (1988); Anbu Kattalai (1989); Sahadevan Mahadevan (1990); Thangamani Rangamani (1990); Sirayil Sila Raagangal (1990); Uruvam (1991)
Bhanupriya	Dharma Prabhu (1986)
Saranya	Nayakan (1987); Manasukkul Mathappu (1988); Andru Peytha Mazhaiyil (1989)
Monisha Unni	Pookkal Vidum Thoodhu (1987)
Chitra	En Thangachi Padichava (1988); Ninaivu Chinnam (1989); Thiruppu Munai (1989); Ethir Kaatru (1990); 60 Naal 60 Nimidam (1990)
Gowthami	Raththa Dhanam (1988); Namma Ooru Nayagan (1988); Kalicharan (1988); Pillaikkaga (1989); Pongi Varum Kaveri (1989); Ooru Vittu Ooru Vanthu (1990); Ponnuketha Purushan (1992); Mummy Daddy (1992); Athma (1993)
Parvathy	Poovukkul Boogambam (1988)
Ilavarasi	Anbu Chinnam (1989)
Rekha	Thangamana Purushan (1989); Sigaram (1991)
Seetha	Rajanadai (1989); Aadi Velli (1990); Amma Pillai (1990)
Vidyasree	Ponmana Selvan (1989)
Sridevi	Rakkamma Kaiyathattu (1989); Police Police (1992)
Bhagyashree	Kadhal Oru Kavithai (1989) (Tamil)
Malashri	Chinna Chinna Aasaigal (1989); Aatha Naan Pass Ayittaen (1990); Raja Naagam (1992)
Anju	Mundhanai Sabatham (1989); Keladi Kanmani (1990); Adhikari (1991); En Pottukku Sonthakkaran (1991); Purusha Lakshanam (1993)
Kanaka	Karakattakaran (1989); Periya Idathu Pillai (1990); Amman Kovil Thiruvizha (1990); Seetha (1990); Muthaali Amma (1990); Durga (1990); Sathan Sollai Thattathe (1990); Sendhoora Devi (1991); Purushan Enakku Arasan (1992); Mudhal Kural (1992); Periya Kudumbam (1995)
Khushbu	Vetri Vizha (1989); Khushboo Khushboothaan (1989); Engitta Mothathay (1990); Aarathi Edungadi (1990); Paattukku Naan Adimai (1990); My Dear Marthandan (1990); Michael Madana Kama Rajan (1990); Muthu Kulikka Vaarieyala (1995)
Shantipriya	Ellame En Thangachi (1989)
Sithara	Pudhu Pudhu Arthangal (1989); Unnai Solli Kutramillai (1990); Madha Komadha (1992); Maamiyar Veedu (1993)
Rupini	Thalattu Padava (1990); Pulan Visaranai (1990); Madurai Veeran Enga Saami (1990); Naadu Adhai Naadu (1991); Naan Valartha Poove (1991); Captain Prabhakaran (1991)
Ramya Krishnan	Puthiya Charithiram (1990); Nalla Kaalam Porandaachu (1990); Thambi Pondatti (1992); Sabhash Ramu (1994); Khiladi Raja (1995); Rowdy Boss (1995); Nakkeeran (1996); Naan Unga Veetu Pillai (1996); Kuttrapathirikai (2007)
Sadhana	Vaaliba Vilayattu (1990)
Janani	Kavithai Paadum Alaigal (1990)
Bhagyalakshmi	Sakthi Parasakthi (1990)
Rama	En Uyir Thozhan (1990)
Sindhu	Pondatti Thevai (1990)
Vaidegi	Puthu Paatu (1990); Oorellam Un Pattu (1991)
Devaki	Thai Maasam Poo Vasam (1990)
Devi Priya	Aerikarai Poongaatre (1990)
Rekha Nambiar	En Kadhal Kanmani (1990)
Surya, Yamini	Oru Veedu Iru Vaasal (1990)
Divya Bharti	Nila Penne (1990); Vaaliban (1990)
Meena	Oru Puthiya Kathai (1990); Idhaya Oonjal (1991) Manbumigu Mestri (1993); Naatamai (1994); Rajakumaran (1994) (Ennavendru song bit); Marumagan (1995); Coolie (1995); Muthu (1995); Avvai Shanmugi (1996); Palayathu Amman (2000); Padai Veetu Amman (2002)
Tabu	Coolie No. 1 (1991) (Tamil version)
Juhi Chawla	Nattukku Oru Nallavan (1991)
Heera Rajagopal	Nee Pathi Naan Pathi (1991); Endrum Anbudan (1992); Dasarathan (1993); Band Master (1993)
Mohini	Eeramana Rojave (1991); Chinna Marumagal (1992); Thai Mozhi (1992); Unakkaga Piranthen (1992); Vanaja Girija (1994)
Sivaranjini	Manasara Vazhthungalen (1991); Durgai Amman (1998)
Suma	Kurumbukkaran (1991); Unnai Vaazhthi Paadugiren (1992); Mettupatti Mirasu (1994); Mudhal Udhayam (1995)
Geetha	Thayamma (1991)
Saradha Preetha	Pavunnu Pavunuthan (1991); Manikuyil (1993)
Rani	Villu Pattukaran (1991)
Sreeja	Cheran Pandiyan (1991); Sevvanthi (1994)
Suchitra Murali	Gopura Vasalile (1991)
Geetha Vijayan	Moondrezhuthil En Moochirukkum (1991)
Dharani	Vanakkam Vathiyare (1991)
Sindhuja	Jenma Natchathram (1991)
Mamta Kulkarni	Nanbargal (1991)
Mounika	Vanna Vanna Pookkal (1992)
Parveen	Innisai Mazhai (1991)
Padmashri	Chinna Thayee (1992)
Indhira	Matha Komadha (1992)
Anusha	Thanga Rasu (1992)
Aamani	Muthal Seethanam (1992); Chutti Kuzhandai (1995)
Shruti	Thevar Veettu Ponnu (1992)
Sasikala	Oor Mariyadhai (1992)
Aishwarya	Raasukutti (1992)
Madhoo	Vaaname Ellai (1992); Panchalankurichi (1996)
Kasthuri	Abhirami (1992); Chinna Mani (1995); Miss Madras (1996)
Amala	Evana Iruntha Enakkena (1993)
Sanghavi	Amaravati (1993); Anthimanthaarai (1996); Ini Ellam Sugame (1998)
Soundarya	Ponnumani (1993); Muthu Kaalai (1995); Jiththan (1995); Calcutta (1998)
Rambha	Police Attack (1993); Bombay Kadhali (1996); Tiger (1997); Kaadhala Kaadhala (1998)
Vanaja Radhakrishnan	Marupadiyum (1993)
Priya Raman	Subramaniya Swamy (1994)
Maheswari	Karuthamma (1994)
Madhuri Dixit	Anbalayam (1994) (Tamil version)
Archana Joglekar	Mogamul (1995)
Ranjitha	Karuppu Nila (1995)
Roja	Raja Muthirai (1995); Parambarai (1996)
Srinidhi	Nandhavana Theru (1995)
Suneha	Aanazhagan (1995)
Shobana	Aranmanai Vasal (1996)
Nagma	Veera Puthiran (1995); Pistha (1997); Maya (1999)
Simran	Delhi Darbar (1996); Kondattam (1998)
Keerthana	Minor Mappillai (1996)
Roopa Sree	Vetri Mugam (1996)
Yosika	Karuppu Roja (1996)
Swathi	Nattupura Nayagan (1997)
Anju Aravind	Arunachalam (1997)
Deepti Bhatnagar	Dharma Chakkaram (1997)
Shilpa Shirodkar	Arasiyal (1997)
Anjala Zhaveri	Pagaivan (1997)
Rachna Banerjee	Poovarasan (1997)
Prema	En Pondatti Collector (1997); Nagamma (2000)
Ramya	Poo Vaasam (1999)
Dhivyasree	Pengal (2000)
Nirosha	Kandha Kadamba Kathir Vela (2000)
Devayani	Thenali (2000); Kottai Mariamman (2001)
Vindhya	Viswanathan Ramamoorthy (2001)
Sindhu Menon	Samudhiram (2001)
Suvarna Mathew	Shakalaka Baby (2002)
Anu Prabhakar	Annai Kaligambal (2003)
Genelia D'Souza	Samba (2004)
Pushpalatha	Mannin Maindhan (2005)
Anushka Shetty	Arundhati (2009)
Gracy Singh, Priya Anand	Gandhipuram (2010)
Sangeetha	Kutti Pisasu (2010)

== Award ==
- 1983 Best New Face Award – Panorama film festival (Veena Poovu (film))

== Television ==
- Flight No.172 (Doordarshan)
- Ladies Hostel
- Solladi Sivasakthi
- Here's Crazy
- Rail Sneham (Voice for heroine Raasi)
- Anbulla Amma (Voice for Meena)
- Shanthi (Voice for Mandira Bedi)
- Sindhu Bhairavi (Voice for Tina Dutta)
- Ramayanam Vijay TV (Voice for Sita )(Tamil Dubbed version)
