= Enga Ooru Pattukaran =

- Poster
- Directed by: Gangai Amaran
- Written by: Sangili Murugan; S. Gajendra Kumar (dialogues)
- Produced by: Kalyani Murugan
- Starring: Ramarajan; Rekha; Nishanthi
- Cinematography: K. B. Dayalan
- Edited by: B. Lenin; V. T. Vijayan
- Music by: Ilaiyaraaja
- Production company: Meenakshi Arts
- Distributed by: Sri Sujatha Pictures
- Release date: 14 April 1987
- Running time: 120 minutes
- Country: India
- Language: Tamil

Enga Ooru Pattukaran (/pɑːttukɑːrən/ transl. The singer of our town) is a 1987 Indian Tamil-language romantic drama film directed by Gangai Amaran. The film stars Ramarajan, Rekha and Nishanthi, with Senthamarai, Vinu Chakravarthy, Senthil, Kovai Sarala and S. S. Chandran playing supporting roles. It was released on 14 April 1987, and became a major success. After this, Ramarajan and Amaran duo went on to collaborate on numerous films, including Karakattakkaran (1989).

== Plot ==
Shenbagam, the daughter of a wealthy landlord, and Seethan, an orphan milkman, are in love but they do not express their love directly. Seethan has been brought up by Maruthamuthu. When Shenbagam's father decides to get her married to a rich man, she commits suicide. Seethan becomes distraught after his lover's death. Maruthamuthu steps in and arranges his marriage with the woman Kaveri. Seethan marries her but cannot forget Shenbagam.

== Cast ==
- Ramarajan as Sithan
- Rekha as Kaveri
- Nishanthi as Shenbagam
- Senthamarai as Shenbagam and Vadakku Vinayagam's father
- Vinu Chakravarthy as Maruthamuthu
- Senthil as Vadakku Vinayagam
- Kovai Sarala as Sakku
- S. S. Chandran as Sakku's father
- Pasi Sathya as Sakku's mother
- Vennira Aadai Moorthy as Gopi
- S. N. Parvathy as Shenbagam and Vadakku Vinayagam's mother
- Kallapetti Singaram as Panchayat Leader
- Karuppu Subbiah as Robber
- Usilai Mani as Arivumani
- M. N. Nambiar as Kallampattiyan (guest appearance)
- Jaishankar as Manjampattiyan, Sithan's father (guest appearance)
- Sangili Murugan as Irulappan (guest appearance)
- Dilip as Irulappan's son (guest appearance)
- Gangai Amaran in a cameo appearance

== Production ==
The film was launched at Prasad Studios and the film's title song was recorded on the same day. Shantipriya made her Tamil debut in this film, and was credited as Nishanti. The cow owned by Ramarajan's character was played by a cow named Pechi. The song "Madura Marikkozhunthu Vaasam" was shot atop the Madurai Meenakshi Amman Temple.

== Soundtrack ==
The music was composed by Ilaiyaraaja, with lyrics written by Gangai Amaran. The song "Azhagi Nee Perazhagi" is set to the Carnatic raga Kuntalavarali. The song "Madurai Marikozhundhu", set to Mayamalavagowla, was reused as "Yamaho" in the Telugu film Jagadeka Veerudu Athiloka Sundari (1990). There are three versions of the song "Shenbagame Shenbagame": one male, one female, and one a duet. The song is set to Sindhu Bhairavi raga.

Track listing
No.	Title	Singer(s)	Length
1.	"Azhagi Nee Perazhagi"	Mano	4:58
2.	"Enga Ooru Pattukaran"	Ilaiyaraaja	4:28
3.	"Jinginakku Jinakku"	Mano, S. Janaki	4:32
4.	"Madura Marikkozhunthu Vaasam"	Mano, K. S. Chithra	4:41
5.	"Paechi Paechi Nee Perimayulla Pechi"	Mano	4:27
6.	"Shenbagame Shenbagame" (male)	Mano	4:32
7.	"Shenbagame Shenbagame" (duet)	Mano, Sunanda	4:27
8.	"Shenbagame Shenbagame" (female)	Asha Bhosle	4:42
Total length:			39:47

== Release and reception ==
Enga Ooru Pattukaran was released on 14 April 1987, and distributed by Sri Sujatha Pictures. The Indian Express criticised the storyline as "static". The reviewer went on to say, "Ilayaraja's brand of soporific tunes mostly in the lower register blend with the unassuming style of the film". Jayamanmadhan of Kalki appreciated the cinematography by Dayalan, Ilaiyaraaja's music and Amaran's direction.

== Legacy ==
After the film's success, Ramarajan, Amaran and Ilaiyaraja became a popular actor-director-music composer collaboration in Tamil cinema; they went on to collaborate in numerous films, including Shenbagamae Shenbagamae (1988), Karakattakkaran (1989), Ooru Vittu Ooru Vanthu (1990), Villu Pattukaran (1992) and Themmangu Paattukaaran (1997). Shenbagamae Shenbagamae was named after the song from Enga Ooru Pattukaran.

== Bibliography ==
- Sundararaman (2007) [2005]. Raga Chintamani: A Guide to Carnatic Ragas Through Tamil Film Music (2nd ed.). Pichhamal Chintamani. OCLC 295034757.
