= Amman Kovil Vaasalile =

- Title card
- Directed by: Ramarajan
- Written by: Raja Subramaniyam
- Produced by: S. Rajaram
- Starring: Ramarajan; Sangita; Manivannan; Senthil
- Cinematography: Raveendar
- Edited by: L. Kesavan
- Music by: Sirpy
- Production company: Mahalakshmi International
- Release date: 9 February 1996
- Country: India
- Language: Tamil

Amman Kovil Vaasalile (transl. Outside the Amman temple) is a 1996 Indian Tamil-language drama film, directed by Ramarajan and produced by S. Rajaram. The film stars Ramarajan, Sangita, Manivannan and Senthil. It was released on 9 February 1996.

== Plot ==
Ponrasu, an angry young man who challenges injustice, defeats the arrogant Muthusethupathy "Sethupathy" in a one‑to‑one silambam bout during the temple festival, earning Sethupathy's enmity and impressing his cousin Poongothai. Sethupathy pressures his uncle Rajappan "Pannaiyar" to marry Poongothai to him; Pannaiyar agrees. Ponrasu, who runs a lorry, refuses to steal from poor farmers and beats Rajappan's goons, incurring his wrath. Rajappan summons Ponrasu's school‑teacher father, threatening to kill Ponrasu unless he stays silent; Ponrasu promises to abandon violence.

Sethupathy extorts Rajappan for ₹500,000 (equivalent to ₹2.7 million or US$28,000 in 2023) to lease Brandy shops to run illegal liquor operations near the temple. When Ponrasu destroys the shop, Sethupathy feigns innocence. Ponrasu's friend, Sakkarai, and Poongothai's friend, Valli, plot to bring the two together, but Ponrasu rejects Poongothai's advances. Pannaiyar once asks Ponrasu, an expert oil‑massage therapist, to treat Poongothai's neck sprain. After the visit, Poongothai shares a meal with Ponrasu, and then she hides his lorry key; their interaction leads both to realize they are falling in love. Upon seeing them embrace, Sethupathy informs Pannaiyar of the affair.

In the past, the elder brother Rajalingam "Periyavar" was highly respected, while his younger brother Rajappan squandered his wealth. Poongothai is Periyavar's biological daughter. Muthusethupathy, whose bad habits have led Periyavar to reject his marriage proposals, vows to marry Poongothai and bribes Rajappan to conspire against Periyavar. Rajappan and Muthusethupathy join forces and drown Periyavar, making it look like an accident. Unaware of the truth, Poongothai believes her uncle Rajappan is innocent.

Fearing exposure, Rajappan arranges an engagement between Sethupathy and Poongothai, even though she loves Ponrasu, after threatening to kill Ponrasu unless Poongothai accepts the engagement. With Valli's help, Poongothai hides in Ponrasu's house while he is away, but Rajappan's goons attack Ponrasu's parents and abduct Poongothai. Ponrasu returns and marries Poongothai before Rajappan and the villagers, shocking Sethupathy. After the wedding, Rajappan bribes a priest to cite a horoscope that requires Ponrasu to stay away from Poongothai for twenty days, claiming the union would endanger him. Believing the priest, Ponrasu's parents separate the couple. Rajappan awaits an opportunity to brainwash Poongothai and arrange her marriage to Sethupathy. Despite Ponrasu's repeated attempts to be with his wife, each effort is thwarted.

Kanthan, an aspiring musician and Valli's uncle, has his ghatam and Mongolian violin smashed by the dim‑witted Sakkarai. Furious, Kanthan abandons music and becomes a pawnbroker, plotting revenge. He tricks Sakkarai into pawning a gold chain by claiming a "magical" vessel that births another; when Sakkarai later asks for his chain back, Kanthan returns only ashes, declaring the chain "dead." Unable to prove the deception, Sakkarai is left humiliated. Rajappan's henchman Sembuli and Sakkarai both set their sights on Valli, but to everyone's surprise, Kanthan marries her. Valli has a quirky habit of slapping anyone who touches her waist, which promptly lands Kanthan a slap. Finding an intimate life impossible, Kanthan renounces worldly life and departs for Kasi to become a saint. The school teacher, Shanmugam's daughter, Padmini, also a teacher, learns her father has an intestinal tumor and needs ₹40,000 (equivalent to ₹220,000 or US$2,300 in 2023) for surgery within fifteen days.

Ponrasu battles Sethupathy's goons, who try to seize government food supplies, and Padmini tends to his wounds, sparking Poongothai's jealousy. Rajappan feigns reformation, emotionally manipulating Poongothai into believing he has accepted Ponrasu as his son‑in‑law. The village priest later admits he fabricated a horoscope that kept Ponrasu and Poongothai apart, now declaring an auspicious time for them to be together. Their first night, however, is ruined by the sudden arrival of relatives. Padmini falls from a ladder, sprains her waist, and Ponrasu attempts an oil massage. While he works, Padmini deliberately embraces him to sow discord, then tells Poongothai that Ponrasu hugged her on purpose. Believing the lie, Poongothai returns home, where Rajappan pretends to be a well‑wisher and further poisons her mind against Ponrasu. Shanmugam apologizes to Ponrasu, revealing that his daughter has been acting strangely.

Ponrasu's father asks Rajappan to send Poongothai back, but Rajappan refuses, and Poongothai too remains silent, unwilling to reunite. Frustrated, Ponrasu suspects Poongothai's trust. Sethupathy plots to kill Rajappan and frame Ponrasu, then plants a bomb in his van during a family temple outing. Overcome by guilt, Padmini confesses to Poongothai that she was coerced by Sethupathy—who promised money for her father's surgery—to falsely accuse Ponrasu. Realizing Ponrasu's innocence, Poongothai feels remorse. When Sethupathy boasts that Ponrasu and his family will die, Poongothai alerts Ponrasu; he hurls the bomb away, killing two of Sethupathy's henchmen. Sethupathy then kidnaps Poongothai, and Ponrasu gives chase on a horse‑cart, rescues her, and fights the remaining goons.

Just as Sethupathy is about to kill Ponrasu, Padmini arrives and pierces him with a trident. Rajappan, now remorseful, seeks forgiveness and agrees to serve jail time for murdering his brother Rajalingam. The story concludes with Ponrasu and Poongothai finally beginning their married life together.

== Cast ==
- Ramarajan as Ponrasu
- Sangita as Poongothai
- Manivannan as Rajappan "Pannaiyar"
- Senthil as Sakkarai, Ponrasu's sidekick
- Karikalan as Muthusethupathy
- Periyar Dasan as Ponrasu's father, a school teacher
- Gandhimathi as Kamakshi, Ponrasu's mother
- Anuja as Valli
- Halwa Vasu as Sembuli, Periyavar's sidekick
- Shanmugasundaram in a special appearance as Shanmugam
- Santhana Bharathi in a special appearance as Rajalingam "Periyavar"
- Kalaignanam in a special appearance as a priest
- R. Sundarrajan in a special appearance as Kanthan
- Rajashree in a special appearance as Padmini

== Soundtrack ==
Music was composed by Sirpy, with lyrics by Vaali.

| Song | Singers |
|---|---|
| "Amman Koyil" | Malaysia Vasudevan, S. Janaki |
| "Enna Vilai Adhu" | S. P. Balasubrahmanyam, Sirpy |
| "Ila Manasu" | K. S. Chithra |
| "Ponnoonjal Aaduthu" | S. P. Balasubrahmanyam, K. S. Chithra |
| "Un Malliyappo" | Mano, Swarnalatha |
| "Vanthal Puguntha" | K. S. Chithra, Swarnalatha |
| "Vayasu Ponnuthan" | K. S. Chithra |

== Reception ==
D. S. Ramanujam of The Hindu wrote, "Village hero Ramarajan has decided to direct the films in which he is playing the hero". The critic added that "he employs a couple of new ploys [...] while handling a weather beaten story (story, dialogue and screenplay are also his) that would have had some response in the Sixties. He still believes in MGR type of acting going down on his knees in song and dance sequences and stretching his hand out and his now slightly thick set figure proves a hindrance in the romantic portions."
