= Thedi Vandha Raasa =

- Title card
- Directed by: Bhoopathi Raja
- Written by: Bhoopathi Raja
- Produced by: Nalini Ramarajan
- Starring: Ramarajan; Khushbu
- Cinematography: Santhamoorthy
- Edited by: L. Kesavan
- Music by: Ilaiyaraaja
- Production company: Nalini Cine Arts
- Release date: 7 July 1995
- Country: India
- Language: Tamil

Thedi Vandha Raasa is a 1995 Indian Tamil language film, directed by Bhoopathi Raja in his directorial debut and produced by Nalini Ramarajan. The film stars Ramarajan and Khushbu. It was released on 7 July 1995.

== Plot ==
Anand arrives at Chennai along with a baby claiming that Devi is his wife. She is forced to marry Anand and have his child. However, she is unaware of his intentions and soon learns the truth. Turns out that Devi was responsible for the death of Anand's sister in college, and in order to avenge her death, Anand decides to teach Devi a lesson by taking his other sister's baby claiming it to be their son.

== Cast ==
- Ramarajan as Anand
- Khushbu as Devi
- Goundamani as Albert Kothandam
- Vivek as Vivek
- Senthil as Selvam
- Kokila
- Janagaraj as Vishwanath
- Anandaraj
- Kumarimuthu
- Thyagu
- Seetha
- Rajan

== Production ==
Bhoopathi Raja, son of screenwriter Balamurugan who earlier provided story for Ramarajan starrers Raaja Raajathan and Nenjamundu Nermaiyundu made his directorial debut with this film.

== Soundtrack ==
The music was composed by Ilaiyaraaja.

Song	Singers	Lyrics
"Chinnachiru Vayathinile"	Malaysia Vasudevan	Pulamaipithan
"Ethayum Thaangum"	Malaysia Vasudevan	Kamakodiyan
"Mama Manasukkulle"	Uma Ramanan, Malaysia Vasudevan	Pulamaipithan
"Nyayam Kidaikamal"	Mano	Pulamaipithan
"Police Mattum"	S. N. Surendar	Ilaiyaraaja
"Raasavai Thedivantha	Ilaiyaraaja	Kamakodiyan
"Vambu Pannuven"	Malaysia Vasudevan	Kamakodiyan

== Reception ==
R. P. R. of Kalki wrote that the debutant director Bhoopathi Raja, who begins the story in the style of Bhagyaraj, is clear about what to say, not how to say it.
