= Namma Ooru Raasa =

- Directed by: Ramarajan
- Produced by: Nalini
- Starring: Ramarajan; Sangita
- Cinematography: Ravinder
- Edited by: lingesan
- Music by: Sirpy
- Production company: Nalini Cini Arts
- Release date: 16 September 1996
- Country: India
- Language: Tamil

Namma Ooru Raasa is a 1996 Indian Tamil-language film, directed by Ramarajan and produced by Nalini. The film stars Ramarajan, Sangita, Sathyapriya, Charle and Vadivelu. It was released on 19 September 1996.

== Plot ==
The story is set in a vibrant rural village and follows Raasa (Ramarajan), a righteous and hardworking young man who is deeply respected by the local community. Raasa lives with his mother and is known for his commitment to preserving the village’s traditions and social harmony.

Raasa falls in love with a young woman (Gautami), and their relationship is initially supported by their families. However, the plot thickens when local landlords and antagonists, driven by greed and old family rivalries, attempt to disrupt the peace. These villains orchestrate a series of events to frame Raasa and seize control of the village resources.

The second half of the film focuses on Raasa's struggles to clear his name, protect his family's honor, and reunite with his love interest. The conflict culminates in a traditional showdown where Raasa overcomes the villains through a combination of physical prowess and moral integrity, ultimately restoring order to the village.

== Cast ==
- Ramarajan as Raasa
- Sangita as Rasaathi
- Vadivelu as Nattamai
- Charle
- Kovai Sarala
- Ponnambalam as Kangeya
- R. P. Viswam as Bhoothalingam
- Shanmugasundaram as Sathyamoorthy
- Ponvannan as Kailash
- Gandhimathi
- Sathyapriya
- Halwa Vasu as Kanakku
- Sachu

== Soundtrack ==
The music was composed by Sirpy.

| Song | Singers | Lyrics | Length |
|---|---|---|---|
| "Chinna Mani" | Mano, K. S. Chithra | Kalidasan | 4:57 |
| "Andankakka" | Mano, Sirpy | Kalidasan | 4:43 |
| "Ennudaiya Maadapura" | Mano, Sujatha Mohan | Kalidasan | 4:03 |
| "Oru Chan" | Mano | Kalidasan | 4:27 |
| "Amma Amma Mariyamma" | Sujatha Mohan | Muthulingam | 4:55 |
| "Kaadu Vetti" | Mano, Sangeetha | Muthulingam | 4:40 |
| "Than Maana" | Mano | Muthulingam | 1:22 |
