= S. N. Parvathy =

Indian actress

S. N. Parvathi
- Born: Parvathi; Burma
- Occupations: Actress, Television Actress, Stage Actress
- Years active: 1965 – present
- Notable work: Pasi; Palaivana Solai; Agaya Gangai; Enga Ooru Pattukaran; Chinna Mapillai
- Awards: Kalaimamani and Kalaiselvam

S. N. Parvathi is an Indian actress who appears in supporting roles in Tamil films and serials. She often plays roles of a mother in films. She has worked in popular movies like Anubavi Raja Anubavi, Pasi, Palaivana Solai, Agaya Gangai, Enga Ooru Pattukaran, Anna Nagar Muthal Theru and Chinna Mapillai. Her debut movie was Panam Tharum Parisu, released in 1965. She has acted in more than 200 films and 5,000 dramas. She won the Kalaimamani award in 1985.

== Film career ==
Parvathy has acted seven plays in the same day. She started acting in dramas at the age of 13. A. V. M. Rajan has acted in several plays from Troupe to Kathadi Ramamurthy's Troupe. She first acted as a mother in the film Panam Tharum Parisu. At the time, she was only 17 years old. She faced a life of hardship until she starred in the movie Pasi. Since then, she has become a supporting actress.

== Awards ==
Parvathy is a recipient of the state government's Kalaimamani and Kalaiselvam awards.

== Television ==
Year	Serial	Role	TV Channel
1999–2000	Sontham		Sun TV
2001	Vazhndu Kattukiren		Sun TV
2003	Roja	Parimalam	Jaya TV
2004–2006	Ahalya		Sun TV
2004–2006	Kanavarukaga		Sun TV
2007–2008	Pallankuzhi		Doordarshan
2008	Manikoondu	Rasama	Sun TV
2010–2013	Mundhanai Mudichu	Meenakshi	
2018–2020	Eeramana Rojave	Pappamaal	Star Vijay
2019–2020	Pandavar Illam	Pattammal	Sun TV
2020	Chithi 2		Sun TV
2022	Thendral Vanthu Ennai Thodum		Star Vijay
2022	Namma Madurai Sisters		Colors Tamil
2026	Kanaa Kandenadi	Kavya	Star Vijay

== Filmography ==
This is a partial filmography. You can expand it.

=== 1960s ===
Year	Film	Role	Notes
1965	Panam Tharum Parisu		Debut
1967	Bama Vijayam	Parvathi's Mother	
1967	Anubavi Raja Anubavi	Savior of thangamuthu	
1967	Paal Manam		
1968	Neelagiri Express	Sabapathy's wife	
1968	Galatta Kalyanam	Ranjitham, stage actress	
1968	Kanavan		
1968	Uyarndha Manithan		
1969	Kanne Pappa		

=== 1970s ===
Year	Film	Role	Notes
1970	Thirumalai Thenkumari		
1970	Enga Mama	Gopal's wife	
1970	Snegithi		
1971	Sumathi En Sundari	Parvathi	
1971	Deivam Pesuma		
1971	Punnagai		
1971	Justice Viswanathan		
1972	Nawab Naarkali		
1972	Naan Yen Pirandhen		
1972	Vazhaiyadi Vazhai		
1972	Pon Magal Vanthal		
1973	Suryagandhi	Parvathi, Radha's Mother	
1973	Prarthanai		
1973	Raja Raja Cholan		
1973	Thirumalai Deivam		
1973	Sontham		
1974	Anbai Thedi		
1974	Prayaschitham		
1974	Pandhattam		
1974	Kulagowravam		
1975	Cinema Paithiyam	Teacher	
1975	Andharangam		
1977	Chakravarthy		
1977	Sri Krishna Leela		
1978	Vanakkatukuriya Kathaliye		
1979	Manthoppu Kiliye		
1979	Naan Vazhavaippen		
1979	Imayam		
1979	Veetukku Veedu Vasapadi		
1979	Pasi	Rakkamma	

=== 1980s ===
Year	Film	Role	Notes
1980	Yamanukku Yaman		
1980	Kumaripennin Ullathile		
1980	Ponnagaram		
1981	Nandu	Uma's mother	
1981	Oruthi Mattum Karaiyinile		
1981	Kathoduthan Naan Pesuven		
1981	Kilinjalgal		
1981	Palaivana Solai		
1981	Sumai		
1981	Meendum Kokila		
1982	Kalyana Kalam		
1982	Paritchaikku Neramaachu		
1982	Agaya Gangai		
1982	Rani Theni		
1982	Sakalakala Vallavan		
1982	Antha Rathirikku Satchi Illai		
1982	Thunai		
1983	Veetula Raman Veliyila Krishnan		
1983	Ilamai Kaalangal		
1986	Mel Maruvathoor Arpudhangal		
1986	Kodai Mazhai		
1986	Naan Adimai Illai	Maid	
1987	Krishnan Vandhaan		
1987	Enga Ooru Pattukaran	Shenbagam	
1987	Oorkavalan		
1988	Shenbagamae Shenbagamae		
1988	Anna Nagar Muthal Theru		
1988	Sathya	Radha's mother-in-law	
1988	Sahadevan Mahadevan		
1989	Uthama Purushan		

=== 1990s ===
Year	Film	Role	Notes
1990	Palaivana Paravaigal		
1990	Athisaya Piravi	Kalaiyan's mother	
1990	Kizhakku Vaasal		
1990	Neengalum Herothan		
1990	Pathimoonam Number Veedu	Parvathi	
1991	Kumbakarai Thangaiah		
1992	Nadodi Pattukkaran		
1992	Annamalai		
1993	Chinna Mapillai		
1993	Maamiyar Veedu		
1993	Vedan		
1994	Manasu Rendum Pudhusu		
1997	Themmangu Paattukaaran		
1997	Vivasaayi Magan		

=== 2000s ===
Year	Film	Role	Notes
2001	Dumm Dumm Dumm		
2001	Sri Raja Rajeshwari	Rajeswari's Grand Mother	
2002	Pammal K. Sambandam		
2006	Kurukshetram		
2007	Veerasamy	Veerasamy's mother	

=== 2020s ===
Year	Film	Role	Notes
2025	Madha Gaja Raja	Madha Gaja Raja's grandmother	Filmed in 2012 and released after 12 years
