= Medhai =

2012 Indian film by N.T.G. Saravanan

- Poster
- Directed by: N. T. G. Saravanan
- Produced by: M. Kumar; Seerkazhi K. Sivashankar; A. Balakrishna Reddy; A. Ramasamy; Nangai Video V. Kannan
- Starring: Ramarajan
- Cinematography: R. H. Ashok
- Edited by: Suresh Urs
- Music by: Dhina
- Production company: Kalaimagal Kalaikoodam
- Release date: 15 January 2012
- Running time: 136 minutes
- Country: India
- Language: Tamil

Medhai (/meɪðaɪ/ transl. Scholar) is a 2012 Indian Tamil-language action drama film directed by debutant director Saravanan and starring Ramarajan. The music was composed by Dhina. The film released on 15 January 2012.

== Cast ==
- Ramarajan as Saravana Kumar
- Kaushika as Lakshmi
- Haasini as Saravana's sister
- Charle
- Raj Kapoor
- K. Natraj
- Vijay Krishnaraj
- Alex
- Ganja Karuppu
- Aryan
- Ajay
- Rajyalakshmi as Kamakshi
- Pandu as a police inspector
- LIC Narasimhan as judge
- Muthukaalai
- Bayilvan Ranganathan
- Vengal Rao
- Vijay Ganesh
- Bonda Mani
- Kovai Senthil
- Siva Narayana Murthy
- Meesai Rajendranath as a police inspector

== Production ==
Medhai marked the directorial debut of Saravanan who earlier apprenticed with Senthilnathan and Hari. The film marks the return of Ramarajan after a gap.

== Soundtrack ==
The soundtrack was composed by Dhina.

Track listing
No.	Title	Lyrics	Artist(s)	Length
1.	"En Uyir Thangangale"	Muthulingam	Unni Menon
2.	"Nilavukku Piranthaval Evalo"	Muthu Vijayan	Harish Raghavendra, Chinmayi
3.	"Thumbikai Thoppai Ganpathi"	N. T. G.Saravanan	S. P. Balasubrahmanyam
4.	"Epothum Elorukum"	Gangai Amaran	S. P. Balasubrahmanyam, Manikka Vinayagam
5.	"Ungakitta Rendukannum Ottikiduchu"	Yugabharathi	Chitra, Karthik
6.	"Annai Oru Kuzhandhai"	Parinaman	K. J. Yesudas, Saindhavi
7.	"Uyirile Kundi Ondru"	Mugaiyur Muthu	Benny Dayal, Saindhavi

== Reception ==
A critic from The New Indian Express wrote "The film is neither too exciting, nor a great disappointment. Only, the whole feel is that of a decades old film".
