= Kullamani =

Indian actor and comedian

- Born: Subramani; 1952; Maramadai, Trichinopoly District, Madras State (now Pudukottai District, Tamil Nadu, India
- Died: 25 December 2013 (aged 61); Chennai, Tamil Nadu, India
- Occupation: Actor
- Years active: 1972–2013
- Spouse: Rani

Kullamani (1952–2013) was an Indian actor and comedian who appeared in Tamil-language films. He acted in over 500 films. He is known for films like Karagattakaran, Apoorva Sagodharargal, Panakkaran, My Dear Marthandan, and many more.

== Career ==
Kullamani came to Chennai to become an actor and worked as a cleaner at a hotel. Producer Thooyavan who saw him took him to actor Jaishankar and acted with him in stage plays. He made his acting debut with Nawab Narkali (1972) portraying Nagesh's brother.

== Partial filmography ==
=== Tamil films ===
Year	Title	Role	Notes
1972	Nawab Naarkali		
1979	Agal Vilakku	Mani	
1982	Vasandhathil or Naal		
1982	Poi Satchi		
1982	Indru Poi Naalai Vaa		
1983	Saranalayam		
1984	Naan Mahaan Alla	Group Dancer	
1984	Vetri		
1985	Idhu Engal Rajyam		
1985	Muthal Mariyathai		
1985	Arthamulla Aasaigal	Naidu	
1985	Naane Raja Naane Mandhiri	Kulaiyan	
1986	Amman Kovil Kizhakale		
1986	Mannukkul Vairam		
1987	Valayal Satham		
1987	Chellakutti		
1987	Uzhavan Magan		
1988	Makkal Aanaiyittal		
1989	Karagattakaran		
1989	Apoorva Sagodharargal		
1990	Panakkaran		
1990	Inaindha Kaigal	Henchman	Guest role
1990	Aadi Velli		
1990	Ulagam Pirandhadhu Enakkaga		
1990	Ooru Vittu Ooru Vanthu	Captain Tamilarasu's assistant	
1990	My Dear Marthandan		
1992	Villu Pattukaran		
1993	Rajadhi Raja Raja Kulothunga Raja Marthanda Raja Gambeera Kathavaraya Krishna Kamarajan		
1993	Thangakkili		
1994	Periya Marudhu		
1995	Thirumoorthy	Peruchazhi	
1996	Vasantha Vaasal		
1996	Purushan Pondatti		
1997	Vaimaye Vellum		
1998	Vettu Onnu Thundu Rendu		
1999	Maya		
2001	Ullam Kollai Poguthae	Illicit liquor smuggler	
2002	Andipatti Arasampatti		
2009	Naal Natchathiram		
2009	Thoranai		

=== Telugu films ===
Year	Title	Role	Notes
1984	Mangammagari Manavadu		
1986	Naga Devatha		
1987	Rowdy Babai		
1988	Dora Gari Intlo Dongodu		
1990	Papa Kosam	Kottam	
1991	Ganga		
1997	Mama Bagunnava		

== Death ==
He died after a month-long hospitalization in the city on 25 December 2013. He was 61. He had been admitted to the Kilpauk Government Hospital because of kidney failure.
