= Vivasaayi Magan =

- VCD cover
- Directed by: Ramarajan
- Written by: Ramarajan
- Produced by: S. Rajaram
- Starring: Ramarajan; Devayani; K. R. Vijaya; Vadivelu
- Cinematography: Ravindhar
- Edited by: L. Kesavan
- Music by: Sirpy
- Production company: Mahalakshmi International
- Release date: 6 March 1997
- Country: India
- Language: Tamil

Vivasaayi Magan (transl. Farmer's son) is a 1997 Indian Tamil-language drama film, written and directed by Ramarajan. The film stars him, Devayani, K. R. Vijaya and Vadivelu. It was released on 6 March 1997.

== Cast ==
- Ramarajan as Kathirvel
- Devayani as Jyothi
- K. R. Vijaya as Kathirvel and Veeramuthu's mother
- Rajeev as Veeramuthu
- Veera
- Vadivelu
- Jayashree as Selvi, Veeramuthu's wife
- Junior Balaiah
- Santhana Bharathi
- Gandhimathi
- Anuja
- S. N. Parvathy
- Thaarini
- Mahima
- Vasuki
- Oru Viral Krishna Rao
- Halwa Vasu
- Madhan Bob

== Soundtrack ==
The music was composed by Sirpy.

Song	Singers	Lyrics
"Katradikkum Neram"	Mano, K. S. Chithra	Palani Bharathi
"Oru Maina Maina"	Mano, K. S. Chithra	Palani Bharathi
"Sathiya Thaiyin"	Sirpy, K. S. Chithra	Gangai Amaran
"Vaanathilae Chandirana" (Lady)	K. S. Chithra	Palani Bharathi
"Vaanathilae Chandirana" (Men)	S. P. Balasubrahmanyam	Palani Bharathi
"Vettaveli Pottalile"	K. S. Chithra, Mano	Palani Bharathi

== Reception ==
R.P.R. of Kalki felt Ramarajan wrote the screenplay within one night and advised him either to act or direct, not to handle both departments and mess it up. The film failed at the box-office, which Indolink attributed to its outdated storyline.
