= Hello Yaar Pesurathu =

- Directed by: Ramarajan
- Produced by: Shanmugharajan
- Starring: Suresh; Jeevitha
- Music by: Ilaiyaraaja; Gangai Amaran
- Production company: Vigranth Creation
- Release date: 22 August 1985
- Country: India
- Language: Tamil

Hello Yaar Pesurathu (transl. Hello, who is speaking?) is a 1985 Indian Tamil-language film directed by Ramarajan, starring Suresh and Jeevitha. It was released on 22 August 1985.

== Cast ==
- Suresh
- Jeevitha
- Goundamani
- Senthil

== Soundtrack ==
The music was composed by Ilaiyaraaja and Gangai Amaran.

Song	Singers	Lyrics
"Naal Nalla Naal"	S. Janaki	Vairamuthu
"Hello Aasai Deepam"	S. Janaki, Deepan Chakravarthy	Kuruvikkarambai Shanmugham
"Vaanilae Oru Thenila"	S. Janaki, Malaysia Vasudevan	Muthulingam
"Pachchai Paasi"	Malaysia Vasudevan, S. P. Sailaja	Gangai Amaran
