= Ondru Engal Jaathiye..! =

- Theatrical release poster
- Directed by: Ramarajan
- Screenplay by: Ramarajan
- Story by: Raghavan Thambi
- Produced by: Siva Ramadas
- Starring: Ramarajan; Nishanthi
- Cinematography: P. Ganeshapandian
- Edited by: V. Rajagopal; S. Saravanan
- Music by: Gangai Amaran
- Production company: Sri Devi Bhagavathi Films
- Distributed by: Moogambikai Cine Distributors
- Release date: 31 July 1987
- Country: India
- Language: Tamil

Ondru Engal Jaathiye..! (transl. One is our caste..!) is a 1987 Indian Tamil-language film co-written and directed by Ramarajan. The film stars him and Nishanthi. It was released on 31 July 1987.

== Cast ==
- Ramarajan
- Nishanthi
- Mohankumar
- Rasi
- Senthil
- S. S. Chandran
- Vinu Chakravarthy
- Ravichandran
- Sulakshana

== Production ==
Ramarajan, besides directing Ondru Engal Jaathiye..!, also wrote the screenplay from a story by Raghavan Thambi, who also wrote the dialogues. The film was shot at locations such as Muttom, Keeriparai and Mandaikadu at Kanniyakumari district.

== Soundtrack ==
The music was composed by Gangai Amaran.

Track listing
No.	Title	Lyrics	Singer(s)	Length
1.	"Poongathu"	Muthulingam	Sivachidambaram
2.	"Meena Meena"	Muthulingam	S. Janaki
3.	"Vandhi Varudhu"	Pattukottai Natarajan	Sivachidambaram
4.	"Nilavukku"	Gangai Amaran	Mano, K. S. Chithra
5.	"Enni Varum"	Muthulingam	Malaysia Vasudevan
6.	"Kaathoda Pogum"	Thirupathooran	Mano

== Release and reception ==
Ondru Engal Jaathiye..! was released on 31 July 1987, and distributed by Moogambikai Cine Distributors. V. S. Thomas of The Indian Express wrote, "Rehashing old plots with added frills has become a trend and [Ondru Engal Jaathiye] is another example of this. However as the artistes are new and the treatment fresh it does not disappoint the audience though old-timers may consider it old wine in a new bottle". Jayamanmadhan of Kalki wrote that Ramarajan multitasking was not the path to success, and noted that the film looked like the reverse of Padagotti (1964).
