= Paattukku Naan Adimai =

- Poster
- Directed by: Shanmughapriyan
- Written by: Shanmughapriyan
- Produced by: S. Rameshchand Jain
- Starring: Ramarajan; Rekha; Khushbu; Ravichandran
- Cinematography: Ashok Choudhry
- Edited by: Srinivas Krishna
- Music by: Ilaiyaraaja
- Production company: Sri Mishri Films
- Release date: 23 February 1990
- Country: India
- Language: Tamil

Paattukku Naan Adimai (transl. I am addicted to songs) is a 1990 Indian Tamil-language film, directed by Shanmugapriyan and produced by S. Rameshchand Jain. The film stars Ramarajan, Rekha, Khushbu and Ravichandran. It was released on 23 February 1990.

== Plot ==
Paneer lives in a village and spends most of his time by singing village folk songs himself. He meets Sandhya, who hails from a rich family and falls in love with her. Sandhya happens to be the illegitimate daughter of a rich man Village President. Post Sandhya's mother's death, Ravichandran takes Sandhya along with him which angers Ravichandran's legal wife and her brother Vajeravelu. Paneer and Sandhya decide to elope and get married fearing opposition from Ravichandran. Paneer comes to railway station and waits for Sandhya, but she does not turn up. Paneer feels disappointed and assumes Sandhya has ditched him agreeing to marry someone of her father's choice. Paneer boards the train and leaves to Madras. However, it is shown that Ravichandran fell sick on that day and Sandhya decided to stay with her father taking care of him. Ravichandran passes away after a few days, but transfers all his wealth to Sandhya in will which angers Sulokshana and Vajeravelu.

At Madras, Paneer meets Julie and her music band. They are surprised by Paneer's voice and requests him to sing in his band. Paneer agrees and does some stage shows along with the music band. Paneer gains fame and popularity. Julie falls in love with Paneer and proposes, but Paneer turns it down saying that he is already in love with Sandhya. Disappointed by this, Julie becomes a nun in a church.

Vajeravelu tries to molest Sandhya, but is saved by Sulokshana. It is shown that Sandhya has transferred all the properties to Sulokshana and decided to leave the house. Sandhya sees a news that Paneer will marry Julie which makes her feel dejected and she attempts suicide, but is saved. Hearing this, Paneer rushes to meet Sandhya and understands her situation. Danny, brother of Julie wanted to revenge Paneer as he did not reciprocate to Julie's love. Danny stabs Paneer's neck and he gets admitted in hospital. Paneer decides to sing in a temple festival praying for well-being of Sandhya, but is shot by Vajeravelu. But he is saved by his chain dollar. In the end, Paneer and Sandhya get united.

== Cast ==
- Ramarajan as Paneer
- Rekha as Sandhya (Voice dubbed by KR Anuradha)
- Khushbu as Julie (Voice dubbed by Uma Bharani)
- Ravichandran as Village President
- Goundamani as Paneer's Uncle
- Senthil
- Manorama
- Sulakshana
- Roopa
- Girish
- Arun
- Anandaraj as Vajeravelu
- Livingston as Danny
- Pandu as Paneer's brother-in-law
- Disco Shanti as Dancer Rakkama
- Pournami
- S. N. Parvathy
- Vijaya Chandrika

== Soundtrack ==
The music was composed by Ilaiyaraaja.

Song	Singers	Lyrics	Length
"Thaalaathu Ketkaatha"	Mano	Ponnadiyan	04:35
"Poove Poove"	Malaysia Vasudevan, K. S. Chithra	Gangai Amaran	04:30
"Kettaalum Seru"	Malaysia Vasudevan	Gangai Amaran	04:34
"Pulli Vacha"	Malaysia Vasudevan	Gangai Amaran	04:33
"Yaar Paadum"	Malaysia Vasudevan, S. Janaki	Gangai Amaran	05:33
"Paattukku Jodiya"	Malaysia Vasudevan, K. S. Chithra	Gangai Amaran	05:41
"Athi Marakkili"	Malaysia Vasudevan	Gangai Amaran	04:45

== Reception ==
P. S. S. of Kalki appreciated the film's cinematography and music.
