= Sangili Murugan =

Indian actor, screenwriter and producer

- Born: Muthuvel Murugan; 8 October 1940 (age 86); Madurai, Tamilnadu, India
- Occupations: Actor, screenwriter, producer
- Years active: 1979–present
- Spouse: Kalyani
- Children: 1

Muthuvel Murugan, better known by his stage name Sangili Murugan, is an Indian actor, screenwriter and producer. During the 1980s and 1990s, he was an actor doing negative and supporting roles in Tamil films. He has also worked as production controller in a number of films. His birth name included Murugan; the prefix "Sangili" was added to his name after the famous character in his second film Oru Kai Osai. His first movie was Suvarilladha Chiththirangal. Murugan is the founder of the production and distribution company, Murugan Cine Arts, and has produced over 12 films.

== Filmography ==
=== Producer ===
Year	Title	Notes
1986	Karimedu Karuvayan	
1987	Enga Ooru Pattukaran	also writer
1988	Sakkarai Panthal	also writer
1988	Enga Ooru Kavalkaran	also writer
1989	Paandi Nattu Thangam	also writer
1990	Periya Veetu Pannakkaran	also writer
1992	Nadodi Pattukkaran	also writer
1994	Periya Marudhu	
1997	Kadhalukku Mariyadhai	
1997	Pasamulla Pandiyare	
2010	Sura	
2016	Meendum Oru Kadhal Kadhai	

=== Distributor ===
Year	Title	Notes
2022	Yutha Satham	
2022	Naan Mirugamaai Maara	

=== Actor ===
Year	Title	Role	Notes
1979	Ponnu Oorukku Pudhusu	Police Constable	Debut; credited as Murugan
1979	Suvarilladha Chiththirangal		
1980	Oru Kai Oosai	Sangali	
1981	Sattam Oru Iruttarai	George	
1981	Sivappu Malli		
1981	Sumai		
1981	Vidiyum Varai Kaathiru	Sethupathy	
1981	Kazhugu	Rajarishi	
1981	Kadal Meengal	Dhanakodi	
1982	Auto Raja	Chellappa	
1982	Mullillatha Roja		
1983	Sivappu Sooriyan	Rammohan	
1983	Saatchi		
1983	Police Police		
1983	Saattai Illatha Pambaram	Muthu	
1984	Naan Mahaan Alla	Doctor	
1984	Nandri	Sathyanathan	
1984	Vellai Pura Ondru		
1984	Mahanagaramlo Mayagadu		Telugu film
1984	Valartha Kada		
1985	Pudhu Yugam		
1985	Chidambara Rahasiyam	Ambalavaanan	
1986	Karimedu Karuvayan		
1986	Maragatha Veenai	Town Minor	
1986	Mahasakthi Maariyamman		
1987	Jothimalar		
1987	Kavithai Paada Neramillai		
1987	Mupperum Deviyar		
1988	Kodi Parakuthu	Dhadha	Guest appearance
1988	Enga Ooru Kavalkaran		Also writer
1990	Periya Veetu Pannakkaran		
1990	Ooru Vittu Ooru Vanthu	Sikandar Bai	
1991	Enga Ooru Sippai		Also writer
1992	Nadodi Pattukkaran		
1992	Thevar Magan	Subbiah	
1993	Aranmanai Kili	Raasaiya's father	
1999	Nesam Pudhusu	Village President	
1999	Ethirum Pudhirum	Panchayat Thalaivar	
2003	Jayam	Train TTR (Climax)	
2005	Maayavi	Asari	
2005	Arinthum Ariyamalum	Ganapathy	
2006	Thalaimagan		
2008	Ellam Avan Seyal	Chinthamani's uncle	
2014	Jigarthanda	'Petti Kadai' Palani	
2015	Adhibar	Parthasarathy	
2015	Puli	Washerman	
2016	Oyee	Krish's grandfather	
2016	Manithan	Moorthy	
2016	Kabali	Palace Owner	Cameo
2016	Meendum Oru Kadhal Kadhai		
2016	Uchathula Shiva	Accused	
2016	Ammani	Patient	
2016	Balle Vellaiyathevaa	Kanakagan	
2017	Yaman	Tamizharasan's grandfather	
2017	Maragadha Naanayam	Homeless dead body	
2017	Mersal	Salim Ghosh	
2018	Mannar Vagaiyara	Sangili Thatha	
2018	Ratsasan	Arun's house owner	
2018	Billa Pandi	Jayalakshmanan	
2018	Thuppakki Munai	Hotel Owner	
2018	Maari 2	House owner	
2019	Namma Veettu Pillai	Sangili	
2019	Dhanusu Raasi Neyargale	Arjun's grandfather	
2020	Yevanum Buthanillai		
2021	Mandela	Periya Ayya / Karunakaran Periyar	
2021	Kasada Tabara	Doctor	Streaming release
2022	Kombu Vatcha Singamda		
2022	Vezham	Grocery shop owner	
2023	Thudikkum Karangal	Sameer’s father	
2025	Poorveegam		
2025	Galatta Family	Saamy Ayya	
