= Ennai Vittu Pogaathe =

- DVD cover
- Directed by: T. K. Bose
- Written by: T. K. Bose
- Produced by: M. Kasinathan
- Starring: Ramarajan; Sabitha Anand
- Cinematography: P. Ganesapandiyan
- Edited by: L. Kesavan
- Music by: Ilaiyaraaja
- Production company: Sentamizhchelvi Productions
- Release date: 8 July 1988
- Country: India
- Language: Tamil

Ennai Vittu Pogaathe (transl. Don't leave me and go) is a 1988 Indian Tamil-language drama film, directed by T. K. Bose, starring Ramarajan and Sabitha Anand. It was released on 8 July 1988.

== Cast ==
- Ramarajan as Vijaya
- Sabitha Anand as Lakshmi
- S. S. Chandran
- Senthil
- Rasi as Sindhu
- S. N. Lakshmi
- R. Dilip
- Chinni Jayanth
- Radha Ravi

== Soundtrack ==
The music was composed & lyrics by Ilaiyaraaja except Oorellam by Gangai Amaran

Song	Singers	Lyrics
"Oorellam..."	Malaysia Vasudevan & Chorus	Gangai Amaran
"Oorukkullae..."	Malaysia Vasudevan, Saibaba, T. Sunderrajan	Ilaiyaraaja
"Elumbalae..."	Ilaiyaraaja, Saibaba & Chorus	Ilaiyaraaja
"Valaattum..."	Mano, K. S. Chithra	Ilaiyaraaja
"Unnai Pola..."	Ilaiyaraaja	Ilaiyaraaja
"Vellai Niraththoru..."	S. Janaki	Ilaiyaraaja

== Reception ==
The Indian Express wrote, "There is something near to life in the mother-son relationship portrayed in Ennai Vittu Poagathe [...] The film has well-tuned, meaningful songs, thanks to Ilayaraja".
