= Enga Ooru Sippai =

- Directed by: K. Manimurugan
- Written by: Sangili Murugan; Raj Varman
- Produced by: G. Chellamai; N. Meenal
- Starring: Arjun; Sree Bhanu; M. N. Nambiar
- Cinematography: Sri Ranga
- Edited by: A. Joseph
- Music by: S. A. Rajkumar
- Production company: Sivalaya Art Movies
- Distributed by: Madurai J. C. Combines
- Release date: 14 April 1991
- Running time: 144 minutes
- Country: India
- Language: Tamil

Enga Ooru Sippai (transl. The sepoy of our town) is a 1991 Indian Tamil language film directed by K. Manimurugan and written by Sangili Murugan. The film stars Arjun, Sree Bhanu and M. N. Nambiar. It was released on 14 April 1991.

== Plot ==
Rasaiyya, an army man, grows up thinking that his father and sister died in an accident. However, when he learns that they both were tortured and killed by a rich landlord, he decides to seek revenge.

== Cast ==
- Arjun
- Sree Bhanu
- M. N. Nambiar
- Senthamarai
- Sangili Murugan
- S. S. Chandran
- Senthil
- Kovai Sarala

== Soundtrack ==
The music was composed by S. A. Rajkumar.

Song	Singer(s)	Lyricist
"Paadu Thambi Paadu"	Malaysia Vasudevan	S. A. Rajkumar
"Poovo Thaeno"	Mano, K.S.Chithra	Piraisoodan
"Pongatha Kaveri"	K. S. Chithra	Gangai Amaran
"Ooru Engum Kaavadi"	S. A. Rajkumar, K. S. Chithra	Parinamam
"Adivaanam"	Mano, Uma Ramanan	Na. Kamarasan
"Aayarpadiyin"	Malaysia Vasudevan	Muthulingam

== Reception ==
C. R. K. of Kalki criticised the film for being formulaic.
