= Nenjamundu Nermaiyundu =

1991 Tamil language film

- Directed by: E. Ramdoss
- Story by: Bhoopathi Raja
- Produced by: K. Aarumugam; P. Shanmugam; S. Mohan; P. K. Reddy; V. K. Krishnasamy
- Starring: Ramarajan; Rupini
- Cinematography: Santhamoorthy
- Edited by: T. R. Sekar; K. R. Gowrishankar
- Music by: S. A. Rajkumar
- Production company: Myla Films
- Release date: 5 November 1991
- Country: India
- Language: Tamil

Nenjamundu Nermaiyundu (transl. You've got a heart, you've got integrity) is a 1991 Indian Tamil-language film directed by E. Ramdoss and produced by the Myla Films. The film stars Ramarajan and Rupini, while Chinni Jayanth, Goundamani, Senthil and Vijayakumar play supporting roles. It was released on 5 November 1991.

== Plot ==
The village chief, Sathyamoorthy's son Siva, is a youth who does good deeds for the villagers. One night, Siva sneaks into the corrupt village president Sankaralingam's godown, fights off his goons, and distributes the hoarded rice bags to the people. Sathyamoorthy opposes Siva's use of force, believing that only non‑violence is the permanent solution to any problem.

Meanwhile, after finishing her studies, Sankaralingam's daughter Geetha returns to the village. Siva carries Geetha across the river in a coracle, but the coracle capsizes, throwing them both into the water. Sankaralingam is furious when he sees Siva rescuing his daughter. Sankaralingam's aide, Minor, a womaniser, sets his sights on Siva's younger sister Sumathi. He impregnates Gayathri and refuses to marry her; when she confronts him, he claims she is possessed by ghosts. Under the pretence of treating the "possession," he plans to give her abortion medicine so he can escape marriage. Siva intervenes, beats Minor, and stops the plan. At the village panchayat, Sathyamoorthy orders Minor to marry Gayathri.

Soon, Geetha falls in love with Siva, but Siva does not return her feelings. To keep them apart, Siva's friend mimics Siva's voice and shouts at Geetha, but she interprets the shouting as a sign of his affection. Siva fights off Minor, who is harassing Geetha, and Sathyamoorthy sees this and slaps Siva for resorting to violence. Siva hides why he beat Minor to protect Geetha's modesty. Soon, Siva returns Geetha's feelings, and they meet in secret. Sumathi learns about their romance. Minor spots the pair and informs Sankaralingam. Sankaralingam warns Geetha and places her under house arrest. With the help of the street performer Sattaiyadi Kazhuli Mangan and his assistant, Siva disguises himself as a soothsayer, meets Geetha. At the temple, Siva, Kazhuli Mangan and their friends pretend to be saints to see Geetha, but Sankaralingam spots them and takes Geetha home.

In a nearby slum, babies faint after drinking milk bought from Sankaralingam's milk society. Siva goes to the society and fights Sankaralingam's men. The dispute reaches the village panchayat, where the mothers falsely claim they never raised any issue about the milk and that their babies did not faint. Siva realises this is a ruse by Sankaralingam to humiliate him, but is unable to prove it. Sathyamoorthy orders Siva to seek forgiveness from Sankaralingam, but Siva refuses. So Sathyamoorthy banishes Siva from the village, believing isolation will calm him, but Siva declares he will keep fighting injustice. Minor, still scheming, plays with Gayathri, lifts her, and drops her from the stairs near the temple pond, causing her to miscarry.

Siva travels to Madras, rescues a judge from a gang of attackers, and the judge, impressed by Siva's bravery, takes him under his wing to channel his anger constructively. Siva becomes a police inspector and is transferred back to his village, and is shocked to discover that his mother and younger sister Sumathi are dead. Siva's friends tell him what happened after he left for Madras. Sankaralingam, Minor and Minor's relative Kozhanthaisamy steal the temple jewels by threatening the priest. Sumathi sees them, and Minor chases her, trying to rape and kill her. In the struggle, Sumathi stabs herself and dies. Minor brutally injures Sumathi's mother, and Sankaralingam kills her. They also choke and kill Sathyamoorthy's mute employee, Gnanasambandam. They warn the villagers not to speak about the murders.

When Sathyamoorthy learns of the killings, his long‑held non‑violence gives way to rage, and he goes to kill them. Sankaralingam falsely claims to the police that Sathyamoorthy murdered Sumathi and Gnanasambandam because he discovered their illegal affair. Sathyamoorthy escapes from the police to exact revenge. Now Sathyamoorthy is branded a threat to Sankaralingam, Kozhanthaisamy and Minor, and Siva is ordered to arrest his father. He is also tasked with protecting the three men, even though they killed his mother and sister. Siva confronts Sathyamoorthy and asks him to surrender, but he refuses and flees into the forest.

Siva begins investigating the temple‑jewel theft, starting with the priest, but the priest refuses to talk, fearing for his life. Sathyamoorthy plans to kill Kozhanthaisamy on his birthday. Sathyamoorthy distracts the police with a recorded dog‑bark sound and then kidnaps Kozhanthaisamy. During the Surasamharam procession, Sathyamoorthy hides in the crowd and kills Minor with a spear. The police pressure Siva to capture Sathyamoorthy as quickly as possible. Sankaralingam plans to kill Sathyamoorthy before the latter can reach him, and so he asks the forest tribals to invite Sathyamoorthy to their annual festival, and they accept.

On the night of the festival, Sankaralingam slips into the forest to kill Sathyamoorthy. Siva rushes after Sankaralingam to prevent either his father's death or his own. At the festival, Siva and Geetha dress as dancers and slip into the tribal celebration. Sankaralingam aims to shoot Sathyamoorthy, but Siva pulls his father out of the line of fire. Sankaralingam flees, pursued by Sathyamoorthy, and Siva follows both of them. Sankaralingam's henchmen attack Siva, but he subdues them and rushes to protect Sankaralingam from being killed by Sathyamoorthy. Siva persuades him to let the law handle Sankaralingam, and Sathyamoorthy agrees.

In court, Sankaralingam unexpectedly confesses that he killed Kozhanthaisamy with Minor's help because he feared Kozhanthaisamy might become a police informant. He admits he killed Sathyamoorthy's wife, Sumathi and Gnanasambandam after Sumathi witnessed their temple jewel theft. Gayathri then steps forward and confesses that she killed Minor for impregnating her and causing her abortion. The judge clears Sathyamoorthy, ruling that Kozhanthaisamy and Minor were killed by Sankaralingam and Gayathri and orders their trials.

== Cast ==
- Ramarajan as Siva
- Rupini as Geetha
- Vijayakumar as Sathyamoorthy
- Goundamani as Sattaiyadi Kazhuli Mangan, a street performer
- Senthil as the street performer's assistant
- Jai Ganesh in a cameo appearance as a judge
- Kitty as Sankaralingam, the village president
- Kannan as Kozhanthaisamy, village president's relative
- Chinni Jayanth as Siva's friend
- Vadivukkarasi as Sathyamoorthy's wife
- Madhuri as Gayathri
- Sharmili as Parijatham, a fake spirit-possessed girl
- Sathya as Panchalai, a slum-dweller woman
- Meesai Murugesan as Siva's friend
- Kovai Senthil as a priest
- J. Livingston as Minor (uncredited role)

== Production ==
Nenjamundu Nermaiundu was directed by E. Ramdoss based on a story by Bhoopathi Raja. This was Ramdoss, Bhupathi and Ramarajan's second collaboration after Raaja Raajathan (1989).

== Soundtrack ==
Soundtrack was composed by S. A. Rajkumar, while lyrics written by Vaali, Muthulingam, Piraisoodan, Myla Aarumugam and S. A. Rajkumar.

Track listing
| No. | Title | Singer(s) | Length |
|---|---|---|---|
| 1. | "Silu Silu Kaathu" | S. P. Balasubrahmanyam, Minmini |
| 2. | "Devi Unai" | S. P. Balasubrahmanyam, Uma Ramanan |
| 3. | "Rajave Chinna" | K. S. Chithra |
| 4. | "Gumthalakadi Gumma" | Malaysia Vasudevan, Uma Ramanan |
| 5. | "Naatu Nadappa" | Malaysia Vasudevan |
| 6. | "Vetri Melam" | S. A. Rajkumar |

== Release ==
Nenjamundu Nermaiyundu was released on 5 November 1991, Diwali day alongside eight other films including Thalapathi and Gunaa.
