= Shenbagamae Shenbagamae =

- Poster
- Directed by: Gangai Amaran
- Written by: Gangai Amaran
- Produced by: S. Mohan; T. K. T. Dakshinamoorthy; K. Raj Mohan
- Starring: Ramarajan; Rekha
- Cinematography: P. S. Nivas
- Edited by: B. Lenin; V. T. Vijayan
- Music by: Ilaiyaraaja
- Production company: Sri Lakshmana Films
- Release date: 15 January 1988
- Country: India
- Language: Tamil

Shenbagamae Shenbagamae (transl. Oh Shenbagam! Oh Shenbagam!) is a 1988 Indian Tamil-language romance film written and directed by Gangai Amaran. The film stars Ramarajan and Rekha, with Silk Smitha, Vagai Chandrasekar, K. Shanmugasundaram, R. P. Vishwam, Senthil, S.S.Chandran and Vennira Aadai Moorthy. It was released on 15 January 1988, delayed from November 1987.

== Plot ==
The film follows the conflict between two families over their plantations.

== Cast ==
- Ramarajan as Thangarasu
- Rekha as Shenbagam
- Silk Smitha as Mayilu
- Vagai Chandrasekhar as Muthaiah
- Shanmugasundaram as Surulivelu
- R. P. Viswam as Sivanandi
- Senthil as Thavil performer
- S. S. Chandran as Thavil performer
- Vennira Aadai Moorthy as Nadaswaram performer
- A. Veerappan as Deaf villager
- Kallapetti Singaram as Singaram
- Varalakshmi as Shenbagam's mother
- S. N. Parvathy as Thangarasu's mother
- Kumarimuthu as Amavasai
- Sathya as groom's mother
- Pasi Narayanan as Palayapattu Kadhasamy
- T. S. Raghavendra as Villager
- Gangai Amaran in a cameo appearance as Villager
- Usilai Mani in a cameo appearance as Himself
- Pakiri Samy

== Production ==
The film's title is derived from a song from a previous Amaran directorial, Enga Ooru Pattukaran (1987). The film was launched at Prasad Studios and the song "Vaasalile Poosanipoo" was recorded on the same day.

== Soundtrack ==
The songs were composed by Ilaiyaraaja. The song "Manja Podi" is a slower version of the song "Mata Rani Mounamidi" from the Telugu film Maharshi (1987). It is set to the Carnatic raga Keeravani.

Song	Singer(s)	Lyrics	Length
"Manja Podi Theikkayile"	S. P. Balasubrahmanyam	Gangai Amaran	04:43
"Pathinaaru Vayasu"	Malaysia Vasudevan	Gangai Amaran	04:18
"Vasalile Poosani Poo"	S. P. Balasubrahmanyam, S. Janaki	Gangai Amaran	04:37
"Then Pazhani Aandavane"	S. Janaki, Malaysia Vasudevan	Gangai Amaran	07:59
"Saami En Thaali"	K. S. Chithra	Gangai Amaran	04:33
"Vezhuthu Kattikida"	Ilaiyaraaja	Ilaiyaraaja	04:31

== Critical reception ==
N. Krishnaswamy of The Indian Express wrote that Gangai Amaran "has paced the film well and the drama keeps building up". Jayamanmadhan (a duo) of Kalki praised the performances of Chandrasekhar and Smitha, and Ilaiyaraaja's music but panned the humour of Senthil, Chandran and Moorthy and concluded saying Amaran has mastered the trick of making a film neatly without spending too much and without pomp but a little more knitting would have taken a little more.
