= Themmangu Paattukaaran =

- VCD cover
- Directed by: Gangai Amaran
- Written by: Gangai Amaran
- Produced by: Siva. Ramadoss; Raghavan Thambi
- Starring: Ramarajan; Aamani; Goundamani; Senthil
- Cinematography: K. B. Thayalan
- Edited by: B. Lenin; V. T. Vijayan
- Music by: Ilaiyaraaja
- Production company: Sree Devi Bahavathy Films
- Release date: 30 October 1997
- Country: India
- Language: Tamil

Themmangu Paattukaaran (transl. Melodious singer) is a 1997 Indian Tamil-language film, written and directed by Gangai Amaran in his last directorial venture. The film stars Ramarajan, Aamani, Goundamani and Senthil. It was released on 30 October 1997, during Diwali.

== Cast ==
- Ramarajan
- Aamani
- Goundamani
- Nagesh
- Vijayakumar
- Srividya
- Senthil
- Kitty
- Kovai Sarala
- Usilai Mani
- Master Haja Sheriff
- Karuppu Subbiah
- Pasi Narayanan
- Shanmugasundaram
- Vellai Subbaiah
- LIC Narasimhan as Roadside meat seller
- Periya Karuppu Thevar

== Soundtrack ==
Soundtrack was composed by Ilaiyaraaja.

Song	Singers	Lyrics
"Ponnukku Chinna"	Mano, K. S. Chithra	Gangai Amaran
"Ennanna Naattukulle"	Mano	Pavalar Varadharasan
"Yettaiyya"	Gangai Amaran	Pavalar Varadharasan
"Kaveri Aaru"	K. S. Chithra, Mano	Gangai Amaran
"Namma Manasu"	Mano, K. S. Chithra	Gangai Amaran
"Maranjirunthu"	Mano, K. S. Chithra	Gangai Amaran
"Aandavane"	Mano	Ilaiyaraaja

== Legacy ==
The comedy track performed by Goundamani and Senthil where LIC Narasimhan sings "Ninnukori Varnam" and "Paal Irukku" in a comical manner attained popularity.
