= Karakattakkaran =

1989 film by Gangai Amaran

- Poster
- Directed by: Gangai Amaran
- Written by: Gangai Amaran
- Produced by: Karumari Kandasamy; J. Durai
- Starring: Ramarajan; Kanaka
- Cinematography: A. Sabapathy
- Edited by: B. Lenin; V. T. Vijayan
- Music by: Ilaiyaraaja
- Production company: Vijaya Movies
- Release date: 16 June 1989
- Running time: 138 minutes
- Country: India
- Language: Tamil
- Budget: est. ₹2 million

Karakattakkaran (transl. The Karakattam dancer) is a 1989 Indian Tamil-language romantic comedy dance film written and directed by Gangai Amaran. The film stars Ramarajan and debutant Kanaka, while Santhana Bharathi, Chandrasekhar, Goundamani, Senthil, Shanmugasundaram, Raja Bahadur, Gandhimathi and Kovai Sarala play supporting roles. It revolves around two karakattam dancers who fall in love with each other, but circumstances prevent them from confessing their love for one another. How they overcome these forms the rest of the story.

The soundtrack was composed by Ilaiyaraaja and all the songs were well-received, in particular, "Maanguyilae Poonguyile". The film was released on 16 June 1989 and was a major commercial success, running for over a year in theatres, and won two Tamil Nadu State Film Awards. It was also Goundamani and Senthil's 100th film as a combo. Goundamani and Senthil's banana comedy sequence from this film remains one of their most popular acts.

== Plot ==
Muthaiya is the lead performer of a karakattam troupe based out of a village consisting of Thangavelu, Naadas, and Thangam. Thangavelu is known to humorously berate Naadas and Thangam even though he cares about them and does not want their troupe to split over their love. Muthaiya's mother was Muthaiya's dance guru. Similarly Kamakshi is also a karakattam dancer in the nearby village and she performs regularly during temple festival of that village. Chinnarasu is the village panchayat board president and he sets an eye on Kamakshi. But Kamakshi hates Chinnarasu. To take revenge on her, Chinnarasu invites Muthaiya's dance troupe to perform during temple festival instead of Kamakshi's performance.

Muthaiya performs well and is widely appreciated by the villagers. Kamakshi also likes Muthaiya's performance. Kamakshi's father invites Muthaiya and his troupe to his home. And to his shock, Kamakshi's father understands that Muthaiya is his nephew but does not reveal it to him. Muthaiya and Kamakshi fall in love with each other. Chinnarasu gets to know about Muthaiya and Kamakshi's love affair and plans to separate them.

Balaraman is Kamakshi's innocent brother-in-law who works for Chinnarasu. Chinnarasu persuades Balaraman to challenge a dance competition between Muthaiya and Kamakshi for which both accepts. In the meantime, Chinnarasu plans to kill Muthaiya during the dance program. His assassin, a butcher, throws a knife at Muthaiya, but Kamakshi saves him, thereby getting stabbed in her leg after the dance.

Muthaiya's mother gets furious upon realising that Kamakshi is her niece and takes Muthaiya along with her and also does not permit their wedding to happen. She reveals a flashback that Kamakshi's father is her own brother and he eloped with the jewels that were meant to be sold to meet the medical expenses of Muthaiya's father which led to his death. But Kamakshi's father arrives there and reveals the truth that while he went to sell the jewels, he was caught by the police suspecting him to be a smuggler following which he was jailed for a few years.

Now Muthaiya's mother realises her mistake and unites with her brother. Also she agrees for wedding between Muthaiya and Kamakshi. Chinnarasu accuses that Muthaiya and Kamakshi misbehaved in the temple and orders them to walk on fire in the temple to prove that they are pure. Muthaiya and Kamakshi successfully walk on fire while Balaraman exposes Chinnarasu's true identity before of the villagers. Balaraman pushes Chinnarasu on to the fire but Muthaiya saves him which makes Chinnarasu remorseful. Muthaiya and Kamakshi marry with Naadhas and Thangam also marrying each other much to Thangavelu's shock and joy.

== Cast ==
- Ramarajan as Muthaiya
- Kanaka as Kamakshi (Voice dubbed by Uma Bharani)
- Santhana Bharathi as Chinnarasu
- Chandrasekhar as Balaraman
- Goundamani as Thangavelu
- Senthil as Naadhas
- Shanmugasundaram as Kamakshi's father
- Raja Bahadur as the butcher
- Gandhimathi as Dhanalakshmi, Muthaiya's mother
- Kovai Sarala as Sarasu
- Kokila
- Pakkirisamy as a thavil player in Kamakshi's troupe
- Periya Karuppu Thevar
- Gangai Amaran (cameo appearance)

== Production ==
=== Development ===
Gangai Amaran wanted to do a film on the life of Karakattam dancers and their art Karagam. When producers Karumari Kandaswamy and J. Durai approached Amaran to do a project for them they agreed to do the film titled Karakattakkaran. Amaran admitted that his film was reversal of Thillana Mohanambal (1968) with a change of backdrop and it was Ramarajan who suggested the story idea for the film while Amaran revealed he "didn't plan anything for the movie and went on scene by scene".

=== Casting ===
After achieving back-to-back successful films like Enga Ooru Pattukaran (1987) and Shenbagamae Shenbagamae (1988), Ramarajan was the director's only choice for the lead character and it was his 18th project as actor. For the lead actress, Kanaka, daughter of Devika made her acting debut with this film. It was Amaran's wife who suggested her for the role. Goundamani and Senthil were chosen to handle comic relief and this film became their 100th collaboration. S. S. Chandran was the original choice for Goundamani's role. The comedy track was written by A. Veerappan. Since Amaran wanted a female dancer for Ramarajan's troupe, Kovai Sarala was cast.

=== Filming ===
The filming was completed in 28 days. The crew found the village some distance off of Madurai Pandiyan hotel on the way to Alagar Kovil where the film was shot while the panchayat scene with the banyan tree and the climax were shot in Arunachalam Studios and Ambica Studios, respectively.

== Music ==
The music composed by Ilaiyaraaja. All lyrics were written by Gangai Amaran except "Paattaalae Buddhi", which was written by Ilaiyaraaja. The song "Maanguyilae Poonguyile" is set to the Carnatic raga Gourimanohari, "Mariyamma" is set to Mayamalavagowla, and "Ooru Vittu Ooru Vandhu" is set to Shanmukhapriya. The song "Nandhavanathil Oru" was adapted by Ilaiyaraaja's son Yuvan Shankar Raja as "Muttathu Pakkathile" in Kunguma Poovum Konjum Puravum (2009). "Ooru Vittu Ooru Vandhu" was remixed by Natarajan Sankaran in Kappal (2014). S. Shankar, the producer of that film, did not acquire permission to remix the song, leading to Ilaiyaraaja taking legal action against him.

Track listing
No.	Title	Singer(s)	Length
1.	"Indha Maan"	Ilaiyaraaja, K. S. Chithra	04:35
2.	"Kudagu Malai"	Mano, K. S. Chithra	04:31
3.	"Maanguyilae" (Solo)	S. P. Balasubrahmanyam	04:37
4.	"Maanguyilae" (Duet)	S. P. Balasubrahmanyam, S. Janaki	04:25
5.	"Mariyamma Mariyamma"	Malaysia Vasudevan, K. S. Chithra	04:31
6.	"Mundhi Mundhi"	Mano, K. S. Chithra	03:20
7.	"Nandhavanathil"	Gangai Amaran	01:05
8.	"Ooruvittu Ooruvanthu"	Malaysia Vasudevan, Gangai Amaran	04:35
9.	"Paattaalae Buddhi"	Ilaiyaraaja	04:37
Total length:			36:16

For the dubbed Telugu version Garagatta Gopaiah, all lyrics were written by Rajashri.

Telugu
No.	Title	Singer(s)	Length
1.	"Palikindi Kulikindi"	S. P. Balasubrahmanyam	4:47
2.	"Ragame Kotha Yogame"	Mano, K. S. Chithra	4:49
3.	"Ooru Kani Oore Vachi"	Mano	4:34
4.	"Gunde Pagili"	Mano, K. S. Chithra	4:37
5.	"Desamlo Enno Pallelu"	S. P. Balasubrahmanyam	3:36
6.	"Oho Moola Vinayakuda"	Mano, K. S. Chithra	3:38
7.	"Palikindi Kulikindi" (Duet)	Mano, K. S. Chithra	4:31
8.	"Nandana Vanamuna"	Mano	1:24
9.	"Mokkenamma"	Mano, K. S. Chithra	4:18
Total length:			36:14

== Release and reception ==
Karakattakkaran was released on 16 June 1989. The film became a major commercial success, running for over a year in Nadana Theatre at Madurai. However, the producer made little profit because of the low price it was sold to distributors for. Ananda Vikatan rated the film 44 out of 100, calling it a simple, realistic village love story without much grandeur. At the Tamil Nadu State Film Awards, Karakattakkaran won the Special Prize for Best Film, and D. K. S. Babu won for Best Choreographer.

== Legacy ==
Karakattakkaran became a cult film for bringing the art of Karagam into prominence. The car Chevrolet Impala, 1960's model used in the film became popular after the film's release. In an interview with The Hindu in 2002, Somasundaram, a real-life Karakattam dancer was critical of the film, stating that it was an "insult to the dance form". In a 2012 interview, Venkat Prabhu was asked if he would ever remake Karakattakkaran, and said "it would be extremely difficult to do justice to the original". In May 2019, Amaran expressed interest in doing a sequel with the original cast, which Ramarajan opposed the following month.

== In popular culture ==
In a comedy scene from Thangamana Raasa (1989), Goundamani who is jailed for a petty crime, dreams of singing under the music of Ilaiyaraja, he sings "Maanguyile" to Vinu Chakravarthy.

Ooru Vittu Ooru Vanthu (1990) also directed by Gangai Amaran was named after a song from the film.

The comedy sequence involving the banana joke still remains a cult classic. In the comedy sequence, Senthil goes to buy two bananas for one rupee. When he returns to Goundamani with one of the two bananas after eating the other one, Goundamani asks him where the other banana is, and Senthil replies to him by saying that the other banana is the one Goundamani is holding in his hand. The sequence was referred to in the films Puthu Paatu (1990), Ponnuketha Purushan (1992), Muthal Seethanam (1992), Pudhayal (1997), Seerivarum Kaalai (2001), and a deleted scene from Thuppakki (2012) where Vijay recreates the dialogues in Hindi.

In Saroja (2008), when the friends witness the car which they are going to travel, the theme music of Karagattakaran is used as background music for the scene.

In a comedy sequence in All in All Azhagu Raja (2013), Chitra Devi Priya's mother (Sriranjani) tells her daughter (Kajal Aggarwal) that she cannot sing well and laments that she hit her head while listening to Chitra Devi Priya sing "Maanguyilae".

The 2016 film Jil Jung Juk reveals who had kept Soppanasundari, the previous owner of the pink 1960 Chevrolet Impala according to the Karakattakkaran plot.

== Bibliography ==
- Dhananjayan, G. (2011). The Best of Tamil Cinema, 1931 to 2010: 1977–2010. Galatta Media. OCLC 733724281.
- Sundararaman (2007) [2005]. Raga Chintamani: A Guide to Carnatic Ragas Through Tamil Film Music (2nd ed.). Pichhamal Chintamani. OCLC 295034757.
