= Ramarajan =

Indian film director, screenwriter, actor and politician (born 1960)

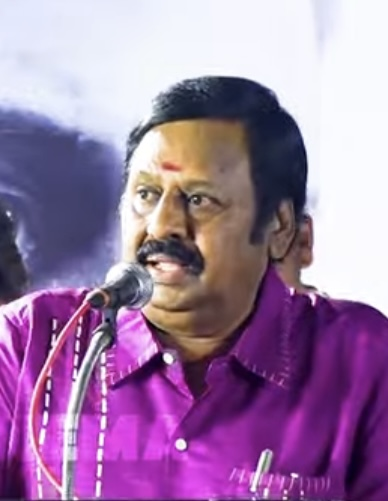
- Ramarajan in 2024

Member of Parliament, Lok Sabha for Tiruchendur
- In office 10 March 1998 – 26 April 1999
- President: K. R. Narayanan
- Constituency: Tiruchendur

Personal details
- Born: Kumaresan Ramaiyya; 18 October 1960 (age 66) Okkur, Sivagangai District, Tamil Nadu, India
- Party: All India Anna Dravida Munnetra Kazhagam
- Spouse: Nalini (m. 1987; div. 2000)
- Children: 2
- Occupation: Film director; Screenwriter; Actor; Politician

Kumaresan Ramaiyya, better knows as Ramarajan (born 18 October 1960) is an Indian film director, screenwriter, actor and politician. He is referred as "Makkal Nayagan" for acting and directing films on village-based subjects.

== Career ==
Ramarajan started his career by doing small roles beginning in the year 1978. He turned director with Mannukketha Ponnu (1985), Ramarajan approached Gangai Amaran to compose music. He got his first hype as a lead in the film Namma Ooru Nalla Ooru, released in 1986. He is popular for doing films on the village-based subjects; these films became the notable identity of Ramarajan. He was known for his dark shirts and colorful costumes. His film Karagattakaran (1989) was a blockbuster hit. It ran for over 100 days in 25 centers, one year in eight centres and clocked 400 days in four theatres. This was Ramarajan’s 18th film as hero, and his third collaboration with Gangai Amaran after two hits in Enga Ooru Pattukaran (1987) and Shenbagamae Shenbagamae (1988). He is also known for his performances in Enga Ooru Kavalkaran (1988) and Paattukku Naan Adimai (1990).

After the mid-1990s, his career started facing the down side. His low budget film Medhai was released in 2012 and was a failure at the box office. He has returned to acting after a gap of almost 13 years in a film titled Saamaniyan. Ramarajan has played the solo hero continuously for 45 films.

== Political career ==
He was elected to 12th Lok Sabha as an All India Anna Dravida Munnetra Kazhagam candidate from Thiruchendur Lok Sabha constituency in 1998.

== Personal life ==
He was the fifth of six children to Ramaiyya and Vellaiammal, in Okkur, Ramanathapuram. Ramarajan fell in love with actress Nalini and they married in 1987. However, after 13 years they divorced in 2000, citing differences in their relationship. They have twin children; daughter Aruna, and, son Arun, born in 1988.

== Filmography ==
=== As actor ===
| Year | Title | Role | Note |
|---|---|---|---|
| 1978 | Meenatchi Kunkumam | Rich man | Uncredited role in the song "Penn Ninaithal Kaaman" |
| 1979 | Anbe Sangeetha | | Uncredited role |
| 1980 | Theru Vilakku | | Uncredited role |
| 1981 | Sivappu Malli | Aruna's husband | Uncredited role |
| 1981 | Pattam Parakattum | Kannan's friend | Uncredited role |
| 1982 | Kanne Radha | Bridegroom | Uncredited role in the song "Kottungadi Ketti Melam" |
| 1983 | Soorakottai Singakutti | | Uncredited role |
| 1984 | Sattathai Thiruthungal | Chiranjeevi's roommate | Uncredited role |
| 1984 | Vengayin Maindhan | | Uncredited role |
| 1986 | Namma Ooru Nalla Ooru | Ramu | Debut as Hero; Cinema Express Award for Best New Face Actor |
| 1987 | Enga Ooru Pattukaran | Seethan | |
| 1987 | Evargal Indiyargal | Ramu | |
| 1987 | Ondru Engal Jaathiye..! | Ramu | Also director |
| 1987 | Neram Nalla Irukku | Dr. Raja | |
| 1987 | Gramatthu Minnal | Selvarasu | |
| 1988 | Ennai Vittu Pogaathe | Vijaya | |
| 1988 | Shenbagamae Shenbagamae | Thangarasu | |
| 1988 | Raasave Unnai Nambi | Raja | |
| 1988 | Rayilukku Neramachu | Manikkam | |
| 1988 | Paarthal Pasu | Lawyer Shankar | |
| 1988 | Melam Kottu Thali Kattu | Ramu | |
| 1988 | Enga Ooru Kavalkaran | Kanthaya | In This Film He has got the title 'Makkal Nayagan' |
| 1988 | Namma Ooru Nayagan | Jagan | |
| 1989 | Pongi Varum Kaveri | Muthu | |
| 1989 | Enne Petha Raasa | Raja | |
| 1989 | Enga Ooru Mappillai | Velu | |
| 1989 | Karagattakaran | Muththaiya | |
| 1989 | Raaja Raajathan | Raja | |
| 1989 | Anbu Kattalai | Jagan | |
| 1989 | Thangamana Raasa | Thangarasu | |
| 1989 | Manasukketha Maharasa | Raja | |
| 1990 | Paattukku Naan Adimai | Panneer | |
| 1990 | Thangathin Thangam | Thangamuthu | |
| 1990 | Ooru Vittu Ooru Vanthu | Selvaraj | |
| 1990 | Puthu Paatu | Ramu | |
| 1991 | Naadu Adhai Naadu | Manikkam | |
| 1991 | Annan Kattiya Vazhi | Anand | |
| 1991 | Mill Thozhilali | Balu | |
| 1991 | Oorellam Un Pattu | Agara Muthan | |
| 1991 | Nenjamundu Nermaiyundu | Siva | |
| 1992 | Ponnuketha Purushan | Ganapathy | |
| 1992 | Villu Pattukaran | Kalimuthu | |
| 1995 | Thedi Vandha Raasa | Anand | |
| 1996 | Amman Kovil Vaasalile | Ponrasu | Also director |
| 1996 | Namma Ooru Raasa | Raasa | Also director |
| 1997 | Gopura Deepam | Balu | Also writer & director |
| 1997 | Vivasaayi Magan | Kathirvel | Also writer & director |
| 1997 | Themmangu Paattukaaran | Thangarasu | |
| 1999 | Poomaname Vaa | | |
| 1999 | Annan | Velan | |
| 2001 | Ponnana Neram | A.C Manivel | |
| 2001 | Seerivarum Kaalai | Kaalayan | Also writer & director |
| 2012 | Medhai | Saravana Kumar | |
| 2024 | Saamaniyan | Sankara Narayanan | |

=== As director ===
| Year | Film |
|---|---|
| 1985 | Mannukketha Ponnu |
| 1985 | Marudhani |
| 1985 | Hello Yaar Pesurathu |
| 1986 | Marakka Maatten |
| 1986 | Solai Pushpangal |
| 1987 | Ondru Engal Jaathiye..! |
| 1996 | Amman Kovil Vaasalile |
| 1996 | Namma Ooru Raasa |
| 1997 | Gopura Deepam |
| 1997 | Vivasaayi Magan |
| 2001 | Seerivarum Kaalai |

== See also ==
- Nalini
- Ramarajan (TV series)
