= Anbu Kattalai =

- DVD cover
- Directed by: Yaar Kannan
- Written by: Venkat (dialogues)
- Story by: Yaar Kannan
- Produced by: K. Lakshmi
- Starring: Ramarajan; Pallavi; K. R. Vijaya
- Cinematography: K. B. Dhayalan
- Edited by: Rajakeerthi
- Music by: Ilaiyaraaja
- Production company: Sri Gayathri Cine Arts
- Release date: 28 October 1989
- Country: India
- Language: Tamil

Anbu Kattalai (transl. Kind Condition) is a 1989 Indian Tamil-language film directed by Yaar Kannan, starring Ramarajan, Pallavi and K. R. Vijaya. It was released on 28 October 1989.

== Plot ==
Shakthivel is determined to kill Balakrishnan and Rajamanikam for killing his brother and his family. He succeeds in killing Balakrishnan but his own son is hunting for him to kill him.

== Cast ==
- Ramarajan as CID Jagan
- Pallavi as Sudha
- K. R. Vijaya as Sumathi
- Goundamani
- Senthil
- Vinu Chakravarthy as Sakthivel
- Kitty
- Kullamani
- Usilai Mani
- Thideer Kannaiah
- Master Haja Sheriff
- King Kong
- Kanal Kannan as Henchman (special appearance)
- Ganesh as blind singer in song "Oru Koottin" (special appearance)

== Soundtrack ==
The music was composed by Ilaiyaraaja.

Song	Singers	Lyrics	Length
"Ponmaaney Ponmaaney"	Mano, K. S. Chithra	Gangai Amaran	04:28
"Vethalai Vethalai"	K. S. Chithra	Gangai Amaran	04:22
"Oru Koottin Kiligal Thaan"	Ilaiyaraaja	Piraisoodan	04:44
"Raathiri Neram"	S. Janaki	Gangai Amaran	04:31
"Sonna Petcha Kelu"	Mano	Gangai Amaran	04:25
"Vaakkappattu Valavi Pottu"	Malaysia Vasudevan	Gangai Amaran	04:20

== Release ==
Anbu Kattalai was released on 28 October 1989 on the occasion of Diwali alongside another Ramarajan starrer Thangamana Raasa.
