= Enga Ooru Kavakkaran =

- DVD cover
- Directed by: T. P. Gajendran
- Screenplay by: Sangili Murugan
- Story by: Rajavarman
- Produced by: Kalyani Murugan
- Starring: Ramarajan; Gautami; M. N. Nambiar; T. P. Gajendran
- Cinematography: N. K. Viswanathan
- Edited by: Ganesh-Kumar
- Music by: Ilaiyaraaja
- Production company: Meenakshi Arts
- Release date: 27 August 1988
- Country: India
- Language: Tamil

Enga Ooru Kavakkaran (transl. Bodyguard of our town) is a 1988 Indian Tamil language film, directed by T. P. Gajendran and produced by Kalyani Murugan. The film stars Ramarajan, Gautami, M. N. Nambiar and T. P. Gajendran. It was released on 27 August 1988, and became a success, with a 100-day theatrical run.

== Plot ==
A beautiful young woman falls in love with her bodyguard. However, they must overcome many challenges in order to be together.

== Cast ==
- Ramarajan as Kanthaya
- Gautami as Poovayi
- M. N. Nambiar as Pandimuni Devar
- Senthamarai as Ramaswamy Devar
- T. P. Gajendran
- S. S. Chandran as Senthil's father
- Sangili Murugan as Sikandar Bai Tea shop owner
- Senthil as Senthil Kumaran
- Gandhimathi as Muthammal
- Usilai Mani as Mani
- Kovai Sarala as Sarasu
- Y. Vijaya
- Babloo Prithiveeraj as Thief
- G. M. Sundar as Thief

== Soundtrack ==
The music was composed by Ilaiyaraaja. The title song is set to the raga Kharaharapriya.

Song	Singers	Lyrics	Length
"Aasayilae"	P. Susheela	Gangai Amaran	04:38
"Arumbagi"	Deepan Chakravarthy, P. Susheela	Na. Kamarasan	04:25
"Enga Ooru Kaavalkaaran"	Ilaiyaraaja	Gangai Amaran	03:37
"Jivunu Jivunu"	Mano, P. Susheela	Piraisoodan	04:18
"Maala Karukkaliley"	Mano, P. Susheela	Gangai Amaran	04:08
"Aasaiyilae" – 2	Mano, P. Susheela	Gangai Amaran	04:17
"Siruvani"	Ilaiyaraaja, S. P. Sailaja, Sunantha	Piraisoodan	04:00
"Thopporam"	P. Susheela	Gangai Amaran	04:20
