= Enga Ooru Mappillai =

- Theatrical release poster
- Directed by: T. P. Gajendran
- Screenplay by: S. Gajendrakumar
- Story by: Rajakumaran
- Produced by: Sureshkanth; M. Jagadeeswaran
- Starring: Ramarajan; Gautami
- Cinematography: P. S. Nivas
- Edited by: Ganesh—Kumar
- Music by: Ilaiyaraaja
- Production companies: VNR Creations; Citizen Films
- Release date: 14 April 1989
- Country: India
- Language: Tamil

Enga Ooru Mappillai (transl. Our village's groom) is a 1989 Indian Tamil-language film, directed by T. P. Gajendran and produced by Sureshkanth and M. Jagadeeshwaran. The film stars Ramarajan and Gautami. It features Goundamani, Senthil, Santhana Bharathi and Kovai Sarala in supporting roles. The film was released on 14 April 1989, and became a box office success.

== Plot ==
Velu moves in with his uncle Chokalingam after his mother dies, but is constantly berated by his aunt and her three con artist brothers. Naive and slightly hapless, Velu often takes the blame for the misdeeds of the three brothers. In this manner, he is pitted against Panjavarnam, daughter of Sathyamorthy, a village leader and Gandhian. Rajalingam, the richest man in town, uses his guise as a charitable village elder to rape young women and brew moonshine.

When Sathyamoorthy offers Velu a job, he and Panjavarnam become friends. Rajalingam sets his sights on Panjavarnam, but his plots to kidnap her are foiled by a clueless Velu. Upset, Rajalingam convinces her father to agree to her marriage with another man. Due to fortunate circumstances, the true nature of the man is revealed, allowing Velu and Panjavarnam to marry. On their wedding night, Rajalingam's men attempt to kidnap Panjavarnam. They do not succeed, but Velu is chased away and beaten to near-death after he witnesses Rajalingam murdering a man. The rest of the village believes him to be dead. Velu is rescued by a military man and taught to fight. He returns to the village to reunite with Panjavarnam and punish Rajalingam for his misdeeds.

== Cast ==
- Ramarajan as Velu
- Gautami as Panjavarnam
- Goundamani
- R. S. Manohar as Military man
- Senthil
- Kovai Sarala as Chandra
- Vinu Chakravarthy as Chokalingam
- Kallapetti Singaram as Sathyamoorthy
- R. P. Viswam as Rajalingam
- Vijaya Krishnaraj
- Haaja Sheriff
- Kuyili

== Production ==
Ramarajan originally aspired to be the film's director, but could not do so due to his acting commitments; he remained the film's lead actor and successfully recommended T. P. Gajendran as director.

== Soundtrack ==
The music was composed by Ilaiyaraaja.

Song	Singers	Lyrics
"Vaanathula Velli"	Mano, K. S. Chithra	Vaali
"Thottathu"	Malaysia Vasudevan	Vaali
"Oorukkulla"	S. P. Sailaja	Piraisoodan
"En Kaveriye"	Ilaiyaraaja, K. S. Chithra	Gangai Amaran
"Kodupatha Koduthuttu"	K. S. Chithra, Mano, Deepan Chakravarthy	Gangai Amaran
