= Namma Ooru Nayagan =

- Title card
- Directed by: Yaar Kannan
- Story by: Raja Subramanian
- Produced by: V. Anbukarasu; G. Ravichandran; MRS; S. P. Selvaraj; Raja Subramanian
- Starring: Ramarajan; Gautami; Sripriya
- Cinematography: Robert-Thennavan
- Edited by: Rajakeerthi
- Music by: Rajesh Khanna
- Production company: Olympic Cinemas
- Release date: 8 November 1988
- Country: India
- Language: Tamil

Namma Ooru Nayagan (transl. Our town's hero) is a 1988 Indian Tamil-language film, directed by Yaar Kannan. The film stars Ramarajan, Gautami and Sripriya. It was a box office failure.

== Cast ==
- Ramarajan as Jagan
- Gautami as Revathi
- Sripriya as Annam
- Senthamarai as Muthu Manikkam
- K. R. Vijaya as Lakshmi
- Senthil as Vellaiappan
- Kumarimuthu as Aarumugam
- Kovai Sarala as Constable Vatsala
- Kallapetti Singaram

== Soundtrack ==
The music was composed by Rajesh Khanna who also wrote the lyrics.

Song	Singers	Length
"Vaa Vaa Vaa"	Mano	04:16
"Jennalukku Pakkathula"	Ramesh	04:52
"Vaadipatti Sandhaiyele"	T. K. S. Natarajan	04:16
"Vanathile Nilava"	Malaysia Vasudevan	05:33
"Therattam Nee"	Ramesh	04:54
"Kannamma Kannamma"	Ramesh	04:34
"Raasave Raasave"	Uma Ramanan	04:37
