= Villu Pattukaran =

- DVD cover
- Directed by: Gangai Amaran
- Written by: Gangai Amaran
- Produced by: Karumari Kandasamy; J. Durai
- Starring: Ramarajan; Rani; Chandrasekhar
- Cinematography: A. Sabapathy
- Edited by: B. Lenin; V. T. Vijayan
- Music by: Ilaiyaraaja
- Production company: Vijaya Movies
- Release date: 27 November 1992
- Running time: 130 minutes
- Country: India
- Language: Tamil

Villu Pattukaran (pronounced [ʋillu paːʈʈukaːɾan] transl. The Villu Paatu singer) is a 1992 Indian Tamil-language drama film written and directed by Gangai Amaran. The film stars Ramarajan, Rani and Chandrasekhar. It was released on 27 November 1992.

== Plot ==
Kalimuthu is the lead singer of a group performing Villu Paatu. The village head decides to reconstruct the tumbledown village temple and gives Kalimuthu the funding responsibility. Finally, the music composer Ilaiyaraaja helps them financially. Then, Kalimuthu approaches a reputed sculptor from another village. The sculptor and his daughter Abhirami come to their village. Later, Kalimuthu and Abhirami fall in love with each other. Abhirami's father wants to marry Abhirami to his nephew Rajasekharan while the village head's son Chelladurai (Vikas Rishi), a womaniser, has his eyes on Abhirami. What transpires later forms the crux of the story.

== Cast ==
- Ramarajan as Kalimuthu
- Rani as Abirami
- Chandrasekhar as Inspector Rajasekaran
- M. N. Nambiar as Nambiyappan
- Vikasrishi as Chelladurai
- Goundamani as Appakannu
- Senthil as Thangappan
- Kuladeivam Rajagopal as Villu pattu Group
- Shanmugasundaram as Panchayat President
- S. N. Lakshmi as Kalimuthu's mother
- Vani as Kamakshi
- Vijayadurga
- Karuppu Subbiah
- Thirupur Ramasamy as Govindhan
- Kullamani
- R. K. as Inspector
- Ilaiyaraaja in a cameo appearance
- Gangai Amaran in a cameo appearance
- Rajkiran in a cameo appearance

== Soundtrack ==
The music was composed by Ilaiyaraaja. The song "Ponnil Vaanam" is set to the raga Khamas.

Song	Singer(s)	Lyrics	Duration
"Kalaivaniyo Raniyo"	S. P. Balasubrahmanyam	Vaali	5:04
"Ponnil Vaanam"	S. Janaki	Gangai Amaran	4:29
"Sakthi Bhagavati"	Mano, 'Kuladeivam' Rajagopal	Gangai Amaran	2:31
"Solai Malai Ooram"	S. P. Balasubrahmanyam, S. Janaki	Gangai Amaran	4:52
"Thandhen Thandhen"	Malaysia Vasudevan	Vaali	4:33
"Vaanam Ennum"	K. S. Chithra	Gangai Amaran	4:57

== Critical reception ==
Ayyappa Prasad of The Indian Express stated that the film "has a very weak storyline" but praised the songs.
