= Raaja Raajathan =

- DVD cover
- Directed by: E. Ramdoss
- Written by: Chandrakumar (dialogues)
- Story by: Boopathy
- Produced by: Smt. Shoba Nivas
- Starring: Ramarajan; Gowthami
- Cinematography: Shanthamoorthy
- Edited by: T. R. Sekar
- Music by: Ilaiyaraaja
- Production company: Dhanisha Pictures
- Release date: 11 August 1989
- Country: India
- Language: Tamil

Raja Rajathan (transl. King is king only) is a 1989 Indian Tamil-language film directed by E. Ramdoss, starring Ramarajan and Gautami. It was released on 11 August 1989, and became a success.

== Plot ==
School teacher Saradha's husband Rajaram decides to contest the village president election against the corrupt Dharmalingam, a man who feigns innocence and has been winning elections unopposed for years. Dharmalingam and his goons attack Rajaram and kill him. Locked inside the house, Saradha is unable to save her husband. Dharmalingam disguises Rajaram's murder as a folklore, making the villagers believe that anyone who steps outside during the deity's graveyard procession at night will be killed. Before his death, Rajaram urges Saradha to protect the innocent villagers from Dharmalingam.

Years later, Saradha, now a headmistress, arrives in Veeranallur village and rents a portion of Tailor Ayya's house. In the market, Dharmalingam's henchmen exploit farmers by fixing low prices for their produce and assault Thyagi Sathyamoorthy, a freedom fighter, for auctioning goods against their orders. Raja, an angry young blacksmith who stands up against injustice, intervenes and drives away the goons. However, the corrupt Inspector Ashokkumar falsely accuses Raja of theft and imprisons him. Although Thyagi attempts to secure Raja's bail, Ashokkumar refuses. Saradha confronts Ashokkumar and threatens to expose his secrets, securing Raja's release.

Dharmalingam's daughter Radha returns to the village after completing her studies and soon clashes with Raja, who humiliates her for her arrogance. Radha and her friends roam the village, causing trouble and humiliating Raja's sister, Mallika, because of her poverty. Radha deceives an elderly village woman, Aachi, by falsely claiming that her only grandson has died, forcing her to sing a lamentation song. Raja reveals the truth, enraging Aachi over Radha's lie. To teach Radha a lesson, Raja, Mallika, their friends, and Aachi conspire to falsely inform Radha that her father has died. Through comic bullying, they attempt to curb her arrogance, but to no avail. Saradha discovers that Dharmalingam has been siphoning government funds meant for the school. She confronts him and threatens to expose his corruption. But, Dharmalingam, using his accomplice Gounder, fabricates a scandal by claiming that Saradha voluntarily invited Gounder for immoral activities. This false narrative turns the villagers against Saradha, portraying her as a woman of questionable character, but Raja defends her integrity.

During jallikattu, Dharmalingam boasts about his bull and declares that none in the village are capable of taming it. To challenge his arrogance, Saradha urges Raja to participate. Raja tames the bull, emerging victorious and humiliating Dharmalingam. Raja demands that the gold chain prize be presented to him with respect. However, Radha contemptuously throws the chain. Enraged, Raja forcibly kisses Radha in front of the villagers. Asserting his self-respect, he returns the chain and walks away, stating that the kiss was a punishment for Dharmalingam falsely accusing Saradha of immoral conduct. Infuriated, Dharmalingam sends his men to attack Raja. Raja overpowers them, but they manage to injure his hand. The incident and Raja's defiance bring about feelings for Radha. Radha seeks forgiveness from Mallika for insulting her earlier and offers the chain that Raja refused. Radha confesses her love and asks Raja to marry her, but he declines.

Meanwhile, the dilapidated government school building—about which Saradha had earlier warned Dharmalingam—collapses, injuring Aachi's grandson. He later succumbs to his injuries, along with a few other children. The villagers blame Saradha for continuing to run the school in an unsafe building. Thyagi intervenes and reveals that Dharmalingam had embezzled the ₹300,000 (equivalent to ₹3.2 million or US$33,000 in 2023) allocated by the government for renovation. Raja leads the villagers to confront Dharmalingam, but he feigns innocence and distributes ₹1,000 (equivalent to ₹11,000 or US$110 in 2023) to the affected families, temporarily silencing them. Dharmalingam ensures the payments are made after obtaining signatures from the villagers on blank papers.

Raja arranges the marriage of Mallika to Anandan. However, Mallika returns home the very next day, realizing that Anandan is a fraud. Raja goes in search of him, only to discover that he has vanished. When Raja returns home, he finds that Mallika has taken her own life. It is revealed that, in retaliation for his humiliations, Dharmalingam orchestrated this tragedy by hiring actors to pose as the groom, his parents, and the marriage broker. Radha witnesses the cruelty of her father and leaves to live with Raja, accepting him as her husband. Radha's mother, Meenakshi, supports her daughter's decision.

However, Raja refuses to let Radha stay in his house, but Saradha convinces him. Dharmalingam devises a plan to bring Radha back to his house. He pretends to approve of Raja marrying Radha. But Radha, realising her father's hidden agenda, ties a thali around her neck and declares that she is already Raja's wife and cannot return with him. Once again thwarted, Dharmalingam plots to kill Raja, but Meenakshi pleads to spare Raja's life, for the sake of Radha. Radha makes repeated attempts to build a relationship with Raja, but he remains distant. Noticing Radha suppresses her pain in front of her mother, Raja begins to soften. During an argument, he finally confesses his love for Radha and promises to marry her soon.

Meanwhile, Dharmalingam uses his influence to have Saradha removed from her position as headmistress. Determined to put an end to his crimes, Thyagi encourages Saradha to contest the upcoming village presidential elections. Dharmalingam then exploits the blank papers he had earlier obtained from the illiterate villagers, using them to secure bank loans in their names and defaulting on the payments. The officials arrive to confiscate the villagers' belongings, but Saradha intervenes, halting the eviction by presenting a stay order she had secured. Realizing Dharmalingam's true nature, the villagers confront him, but he denies all accusations and declares that he will remain the village president forever, openly challenging anyone to contest against him.

Thyagi and Raja nominate Saradha as their candidate with the unanimous support of the villagers. As the campaign intensifies, Dharmalingam attacks Thyagi, leaving him bedridden. Despite this, Saradha wins the election by a massive margin, while Dharmalingam suffers a humiliating defeat. After her victory, Saradha confronts Dharmalingam and declares that she has fulfilled the final wish of her husband, Rajaram. She then visits Thyagi to seek his blessings. Thyagi begins speaking about his son, a patriot like himself, who had married a woman from a nearby village. Hearing this, Saradha realizes that Thyagi is Rajaram's father and her father-in-law. Saradha reveals that Rajaram was killed by Dharmalingam and made everyone believe that Rajaram was killed by the deity's wrath for stepping outside during the graveyard procession, which Thyagi also believed.

During Saradha's swearing-in ceremony, Dharmalingam plots to assassinate her. Anandan, the man who had posed as Mallika's groom, overhears Dharmalingam's plan to kill Saradha. Dharmalingam's men kill Anandan, but on his deathbed, Anandan confesses to the conspiracy behind Mallika's fake marriage and urges Raja to save Saradha. Raja defeats Dharmalingam's henchmen and reaches the temple where the ceremony is underway. As Dharmalingam fires at Saradha, Raja throws himself, taking the bullet in his arm. The enraged villagers attack Dharmalingam, but he manages to escape and seeks refuge with Thyagi. Awaiting this moment to avenge his son's death, Thyagi kills Dharmalingam. The film concludes with Raja tying the knot with Radha.

== Cast ==
- Ramarajan as Raja
- Gautami as Radha
- Goundamani as Gounder, Dharmalingam's aide
- Senthil as Muthupandi, Raja's friend
- Kitty as Dharmalingam
- Manorama as Aachi
- Kovai Sarala as Radha's friend
- Raasi as Mallika, Raja's sister
- Henry as Anandan
- Vennira Aadai Moorthy as a marriage broker
- Usilai Mani as Tailor Ayya
- Master Haja Sheriff as Raja's friend
- Pasi Narayanan as Anandan's fake father
- Shanmugasundaram as Inspector Ashokkumar
- Marthandan as Marthandan, the school peon
- Karikol Raju as a villager
- Theni Kunjarammal as Ponnuthai
- Sathya as Anandan's fake mother
- Nagesh in a guest appearance as Thyagi Sathyamoorthy, a freedom fighter
- Vijayakumar in a guest appearance as Rajaram, Saradha's husband
- Srividya as Saradha
- K. S. Ravikumar in an uncredited role as a priest

== Production ==
Raaja Raajathan was Ramdoss's second directorial after Aayiram Pookkal Malarattum (1986). The film's story was written by Bhupathi Raja and dialogues were written by Chandrakumar. K. S. Ravikumar was an assistant director.

== Soundtrack ==
The music was composed by Ilaiyaraaja. It is his 500th film as composer. The film was Ramadoss's first collaboration with Ilaiyaraaja.

Song	Singers	Lyrics	Length
"Eerettu Pathinaaru"	Mano, S. Janaki	Vaali	05:36
"Innum Enna"	Malaysia Vasudevan, K. S. Chithra	Mu. Metha	04:33
"Maina Mayakkama"	Malaysia Vasudevan	Gangai Amaran	04:56
"Mamarathu Kuyilu"	Ilaiyaraaja, K. S. Chithra	Pulamaipithan	04:32
