= Shanmugasundaram =

Indian actor

- Born: 3 August 1939; Madras, Madras Province, British India (now Chennai, Tamil Nadu, India)
- Died: 15 August 2017 (aged 78); Chennai, Tamil Nadu, India
- Occupations: Film actor, Television actor, Voice actor, Stage actor
- Years active: 1963–2017
- Spouse: Sundari
- Parent: Father : Konjithapatham Mother : Ramamirtham Ammal
- Family: Chandrakantha (Elder Sister); Vijay kumar (Younger Brother)

Shanmugasundaram was an Indian actor who appeared in Tamil films. He began his career as an actor in Ratha Thilagam (1963) had acted for nearly six decades in several roles characters in films like Karnan (1964), Karakattakkaran (1989) Kizhakku Vaasal (1990). He is also a dubbing artist. He has acted in over 500 films in Tamil cinema industry. He died on 15 August 2017.

== Career ==
Shanmugasundaram was born in Chennai to a family of businesspeople. When he was studying in college, he had accompanied one of his actor friends to a drama performance, and as one of the junior artists did not perform well, he was brought in spontaneously. To the surprise of many, he had done that role with efficiency, which earned him appreciation spontaneously. He then moved on to work in Tamil theatre, notably appearing as Adolf Hitler in a play also featuring Kannadasan. Sivaji Ganesan was impressed by his performances and recruited him to make film acting debut with Ratha Thilagam (1963), where he portrayed a Chinese army major.

Shanmugasundaram had performed a wide range of roles and was especially famous for playing the nattamai or village chieftain. However, he will always be remembered for playing Salliya Chakravarthy in the iconic Sivaji Ganesan starrer Karnan (1964). He was acting in negative roles in the films of Black and white era. In the 1980s he emerged as a character artist. Over the course of his career, he appeared in more than 500 Tamil films and became a well-known dubbing artist as well.

One of Shanmugasundaram’s standout roles came in the 1989 Tamil film Karagattakaran, directed by Gangai Amaran. His portrayal in the film, especially a poignant scene where he pleads for innocence to his on-screen sister, earned him critical acclaim and made him a popular figure among mimicry artists. In addition to his film work, he transitioned to television serials in the late 1990s and early 2000s, collaborating with actress Radhika in series like Annamalai, Selvi and its sequel, Arasi. In the 2010s, he continued to feature in films directed by Gangai Amaran’s son, Venkat Prabhu.

== Death ==
Shanmugasundaram died on August 15, 2017, due to age related ailments at the age of 78.

== Filmography ==
This is a partial filmography. You can expand it.

=== As an actor ===
Year	Film	Role	Notes
1963	Ratha Thilagam	Chinese Military Officer	Debut movie
1964	Karuppu Panam	Sundaram	
1964	Karnan	Salliyan	
1968	Lakshmi Kalyanam	Balu's mother	
1970	Kalam Vellum	Narasingam	
1971	Aathi Parasakthi		
1972	Shakthi Leelai	Brinkki Munivar	
1972	Mappillai Azhaippu		
1972	Vazhaiyadi Vazhai		
1972	Velli Vizha	Raja	
1972	Kurathi Magan		
1973	Baghdad Perazhagi	Thalapathi Sikander	
1973	Nathaiyil Muthu		
1974	Avalukku Nigar Avale		
1975	Idhayakkani	Nattamai's son	
1975	Pattampoochi		
1976	Uzhaikkum Karangal	Public prosecutor	
1976	Dasavatharam	Prince Namachi	
1977	Unnai Suttrum Ulagam		
1977	Thaliya Salangaiya		
1978	Madhuraiyai Meetta Sundharapandiyan	Son of Minister	
1980	Ellam Un Kairasi	Ellappan	
1982	Deviyin Thiruvilayadal		
1984	Pozhuthu Vidinchachu		
1984	Vellai Pura Ondru		
1985	Padikatha Pannaiyar		
1985	Navagraha Nayagi	Mangalapuri King	
1988	Shenbagamae Shenbagamae	Surulivelu	
1989	Annanukku Jai		
1989	Karagattakaran	Kamakshi's father	
1989	Annakili Sonna Kathai		
1989	Meenakshi Thiruvilayadal	Lord Indra	
1990	Mounam Sammadham		
1990	Kizhakku Vasal	Selvi's father "Valliooran"	
1991	Thangamana Thangachi		
1991	Kaaval Nilayam		
1991	Naan Pogum Paadhai		
1992	Singaravelan		Cameo
1992	Ponnuketha Purushan	Theatre owner	
1992	Pangali		
1992	Villu Pattukaran		
1993	Koyil Kaalai	Murugesan	
1993	Aadhityan	Pannayar	
1993	Manikuyil	Ramasamy	
1993	Udan Pirappu		
1993	Thiruda Thiruda	Chengalvarayan	
1994	Subramaniya Swamy		
1994	En Rajangam	Shanmugam	
1994	Sevatha Ponnu	Sethupathi	
1994	Manju Virattu	Sethupathi	
1995	En Pondatti Nallava	Ponnusamy	
1996	Vaikarai Pookkal	Vellaisamy Gounder	
1996	Take It Easy Urvashi	Subramani's father	
1996	Nattupura Pattu		
1996	En Aasai Thangachi		
1996	Senthamizh Selvan	Shanmugasundaram	
1996	Vetri Vinayagar	Goundalya Muni	
1996	Namma Ooru Raasa	Sathyamoorthy	
1997	Kaalamellam Kadhal Vaazhga	Jeeva's father	
1997	Pongalo Pongal	Pichandi	
1998	Maru Malarchi	Land Broker	
1999	Unnai Thedi	Raghupathi	
1999	Ethirum Pudhirum		
1999	Nee Varuvai Ena	Rajadurai	
1999	Jayam	Nattamai	
2000	En Sakhiye	Shanmugam	
2001	Ninaikkatha Naalillai	Prabhukanth's father	
2001	Shahjahan	Aisha's father	
2001	Ponnana Neram		
2007	Chennai 600028	Sports minister	
2007	Achacho	Nattamai	
2007	Niram	Church father	
2007	Vasantham Vanthachu	Chettiar	
2008	Saroja		Special appearance
2010	Pugaippadam		
2010	Goa	Karagattakkarar	
2010	Tamizh Padam	CBI officer Shanmugasundaram	
2010	Mandabam		
2011	Mankatha	Suchitra's father	
2012	Nanban	Education minister	
2012	Kalakalappu	Minister Sundaram	
2013	Onbadhule Guru	Chinna Gounder	
2013	Mouna Mazhai	Kayal's father	
2013	Biriyani	Sugan's father	
2014	Thalakonam	Sethupathy's close aide	
2014	Nenjirukkumvarai Ninaivirukkum		
2015	Massu Engira Masilamani	Ghost	
2015	Trisha Illana Nayanthara	Ticket Collector	
2016	Jackson Durai		
2016	Kadavul Irukaan Kumaru	Kumar's grandfather	
2016	Chennai 600028 II: Second Innings	Sports minister	
2016	Achamindri	Varaprasadam	
2017	Veruli		
2017	Anbanavan Asaradhavan Adangadhavan	Nattamai	
2018	Bodha	father-in-law	Posthumous release
2019	Kadhal Munnetra Kazhagam	President Panchayat	Posthumous release
2019	Naan Avalai Sandhitha Pothu		Posthumous release
2021	Appathava Aattaya Pottutanga	Sokkalingam	Posthumous release
2023	Kabadi Bro		Posthumous release

=== As dubbing artist ===
Year	Film	Artist	Character	Notes
1984	Kai Kodukkum Kai	Ranganath		
1985	Naan Sigappu Manithan	Banerjee		
1989	Ammavasai Iravil	Oduvil Unnikrishnan		
1989	Vettri Vizhaa	Sudheer		
1990	Kaadhal Devathai	Tiger Prabhakar		
1990	Vaaliban	Kota Srinivasa Rao		
1992	Dharma Bhoomi	Kota Srinivasa Rao		
1993	Police Attack	Kota Srinivasa Rao		
1993	Mechanic Mappillai	Akkineni Nageswara Rao		
1994	Manidha Manidha	Krishnam Raju		
1994	Anbalayam	Anupam Kher		
1994	Mr. Maharani	Kota Srinivasa Rao		
1995	Maanbumigu Mesthri	Sharat Saxena		
1995	Chutti Kuzhandhai	Giri Babu		
1996	Aranmanai Vaasal	Murali		
1996	Nakkeeran	Girish Karnad		
1996	Jurassic Park		DNA	
1996	Idhayame Idhayame	Chalapathi Rao		
1997	Makkal Thilagam	Rajan P. Dev		
1997	Time Bomb	Krishnam Raju		
1997	Akka	Lokesh		
1999	Kaaki Sattaiya Karuppu Sattaiya	Costumes Krishna		
1999	Shanmuga Pandiyan	Kaikala Satyanarayana		
2000	Moothavan	Kota Srinivasa Rao		
2001	Kadhal Galatta	Kota Srinivasa Rao		
2001	Commissioner Eeswara Pandiyan	Rajan P. Dev		
2003	Thaaye Bhuvaneswari	Srinivasa Murthy		

=== Television ===
- Annamalai as Pattalathar
- Raja Rajeshwari
- Sorgam
- My dear bootham
- Ketti Melam
- Megala as Megala’s grandfather
- Vasantham
- Vamsam
