= Ooru Vittu Ooru Vanthu =

- Title card
- Directed by: Gangai Amaran
- Written by: Gangai Amaran
- Produced by: S. P. Thamizharasi
- Starring: Ramarajan; Gautami; Goundamani; Senthil
- Cinematography: P. S. Nivas
- Edited by: B. Lenin; V. T. Vijayan
- Music by: Ilaiyaraaja
- Production company: S. P. T. Films
- Release date: 14 July 1990
- Country: India
- Language: Tamil

Ooru Vittu Ooru Vanthu (transl. From town to town) is a 1990 Indian Tamil-language comedy horror film written and directed by Gangai Amaran. The film stars Ramarajan, Gautami, Goundamani, Senthil and Sangili Murugan. It was released on 14 July 1990. The comedy subplot involving Goundamani and Senthil in Singapore attained popularity. The title of the film is derived from a song in another Ramarajan-starrer Karakattakkaran (1989).

== Plot ==
Selvaraj lives a hometown life with farming, with his mother in Theni district. Selvaraj is a jovial guy who cares for self respect and is responsible in actions. On the other side, Kamatchi is a happy village girl and selvaraj's cousin. Selvaraj's family is managed by his father Ramasamy's income who works in Singapore. Kamatchi's mother Maragadham, a widow, arranges for Kamatchi's marriage sole handedly to a big family from Gokilapuram. Being poor, Maragadham gets help from her sister-in-law Mangalam, Selvaraj's mother for daughter's marriage. On the day of marriage, before the ceremony, groom's father holds the marriage for not fulfilling the agreed dowry. When Selvaraj's mother, Mangalam comes forward to settle the issue, groom's father denies and stops the marriage claiming the groom is above bride's calibre, Also challenges her to marry the bride to her son. Mangalam asks her son to marry the bride. Selvaraj obeys his mother without a word.

That night, Kamatchi becomes furious with Selvaraj and faints. While she is unconscious, Selvaraj sees a mysterious girl's image in Kamatchi's mirror reflection. The next day, Selvaraj receives a letter sent from his father Ramasamy, describing his difficult situation in Singapore and asks Selvaraj to visit there alone. Mangalam asks Selvaraj to visit the temple with his new wife, and informs him of her plan to visit Selvaraj's uncle to discuss their marriage. Selvaraj meets the priests at temple and receives some vibhuti as a blessing.

The second night, Selvaraj inquires Kamachi casually about her past and fears. In minutes, the spirit possesses Kamachi. Selvaraj uses Vibhuti from temple, calls the priests also showing Kamatchi's reflection. Priests use udukai and vibhuti to question the possessed ghost. The spirit gets sensitive to sound and reveals her identity as Mariana from Singapore. Selvaraj's father is in grave danger. And for her to dispossess Kamachi's body, Selvaraj need to go to Singapore. Also she will possess Kamatchi only after sunset. Selvaraj decides to travel to Singapore along with Kamatchi and the two priests. Meanwhile, Selvaraj and his mother visit his uncle's house to inform about the quick held marriage and about his father's letter. Uncle suggests Selvaraj to visit Singapore along with mother and wife to meet his father. But Selvaraj's mother had to stay back pointing the harvest season. Selvaraj along with kamatchi and two priests leave to Singapore.

At Singapore, Selvaraj fails to find the places after wandering around. But after sunset, Mariana possesses Kamatchi and takes them to her house. There mariana reveals the reason behind her death. She was in love with Dinesh, son of a Businessman named Santhosh. Selvaraj's father Ramasamy worked for Santhosh. At first, Santhosh disagrees to Dinesh for marrying mariana due to her financial status. but after ramasamy's advice, he agrees for their marriage. Later, Santhosh tricks to kill Mariana using his henchman from Bangkok. Santhosh presents wedding jewellery to mariana and sends his henchmen behind, to kill her. They act like robbers to Mariana and chase to kill her. Ramasamy helps mariana to escape the robbers, but they kill her putting ramasamy to blame.

Selvaraj knowing his father is in prison, visits him. Ramasamy regrets the blame and advises his son about Santhosh and his threats for him. Selvaraj informs about his marriage and promises to prove him not guilty. Ramasamy asks to seek his friend Nathan's help if needed. Selvaraj meets nathan and gets to know the killer George and his location. Selvaraj visits Bangkok and meets Luis George and threatens to surrender for his crime made to mariana at Chinese temple. George flees and informs Santhosh about ramasamy's son seeking him and his knowledge about mariana's death. Santhosh advises george to kill selvaraj. Later, George with and his henchmen attack Selvaraj and kamatchi. During the attack, kamatchi gets possessed by mariana subdues the henchman's attack and gets wounded. Next morning, Kamatchi learns from selvaraj what happens with her whenever she gets unconscious. Santhosh absconds George. Nathan advises selvaraj to watch Santhosh's office and house to find the george's hideouts. Selvaraj decides to approach santhosh and enters his house as dancers in dinesh's birthday party. Santhosh learns about the mariana's possession when kamatchi threatens him. Santhosh plans to use chinese sorcerers to dispossess kamatchi's ghost to stop mariana's revenge.

Chinese sorcerers makes the rituals to dispossess mariana ghost. However, selvaraj's priests and prayers surpassing them and conclude with an aarthi. George fears for mariana's revenge and santhosh decides to kill george thinking he would become an approver for mariana's death. Selvaraj tries to save george but george gets killed. Selvaraj meets dinesh to explain the situation. The next day, kamatchi gets kidnapped by santhosh. Survived george arrives to selvaraj to inform his survival and help selvaraj. Selvaraj rushes to santhosh house only to be intervened by santhosh's henchmen. Santhosh flees with kamatchi to an island where selvaraj chases behind and informs george's survival and surrender leading cops. Furious santhosh fires selvaraj where dinesh jumps in, saving selvaraj thereby getting himself killed. Mariana and dinesh gets united in death. Santhosh gets arrested and Ramasamy is proved not guilty. Selvaraj with his family and priests return home happily. At their village, they meet a pedestrian Gangai Amaran wishing them good luck for their life.

== Cast ==
- Ramarajan as Selvaraj
- Gautami as Kamatchi
- Goundamani as Captain Tamilarasu (priest)
- Sangili Murugan as Santhosh
- Senthil as Tamilarasu's assistant
- V. K. Ramasamy as groom's father
- Raja as Dinesh
- Devipriya as Mariana
- Kullamani as Tamilarasu's assistant

== Soundtrack ==
The music was composed by Ilaiyaraaja, with lyrics by Gangai Amaran. The song "Sorgame Endralum" is set to the raga Hamsanadam. In May 2015, the FM radio station Radio City commemorated Ilaiyaraaja's 72nd birthday by broadcasting the composer's songs in a special show titled Raja Rajathan for 91 days. "Sorgame Endralum" was one of the most-requested songs on the show. A remixed version of the song appears in The Greatest of All Time (2024).

Song	Singers	Length
"Chingu Chaa Chaa Chingu"	Mano, K. S. Chithra	04:44
"Ikku Chai"	S. P. Balasubrahmanyam, S. Janaki	04:41
"Karpura Deepathile"	Malaysia Vasudevan	05:00
"Oru 10 Dollar"	Mano, Malaysia Vasudevan	04:46
"Sorgame Endralum"	Ilaiyaraaja, S. Janaki	04:54
"Thaana Vantha"	S. P. Balasubrahmanyam, S. Janaki	05:02
