= List of Tamil songs recorded by Sujatha Mohan =

== Tamil film songs ==
=== 1970s – 80s ===
Year	Film	Song	Composer(s)	Writer(s)	Co-artist(s)
1977	Kavikkuyil	"Kadhal Oviyam"	Ilaiyaraaja	Panchu Arunachalam	
1977	Gayathri	"Kaalai Paniyil"	Ilaiyaraaja	Panchu Arunachalam	
1980	Johnny	"Oru Iniya Manadhu"	Ilaiyaraaja	Gangai Amaran	
1980	Ilamai Kolam	"Nee Ilatha"	Ilaiyaraaja	Gangai Amaran	Malaysia Vasudevan
1984	Chutti Chathan	"Chella Kuzhanthaigale"	Ilaiyaraaja		Vani Jayaram

=== 1990s ===
Year	Film	Song	Composer(s)	Writer(s)	Co-artist(s)
1990	Paattali Magan	"Poothiruchu"	Sangeetha Rajan		K. J. Yesudas
1992	Roja	"Kadhal Rojave"	A. R. Rahman	Vairamuthu	S. P. Balasubrahmanyam (SPB)
1992	Roja	"Pudhu Vellai Mazhai"	A. R. Rahman	Vairamuthu	Unni Menon
1993	Captain Magal	"Kadhal Raja"	Hamsalekha	Vairamuthu	
1993	Captain Magal	"Vaanambadi"	Hamsalekha	Vairamuthu	Unni Menon
1993	Minmini Poochigal	"En Yarum Illatha"	Adithyan	Vairamuthu	
1993	Pudhiya Mugam	"Netru Illadha Maatram"	A. R. Rahman	Vairamuthu	
1993	Pudhiya Mugam	"Idhudhan Vazhkai Enbadha"	A. R. Rahman	Vairamuthu	Unni Menon
1993	Gokulam	"Chinna Chinna Aasai"	Sirpy	Palani Bharathi	
1993	Gentleman	"En Veettu Thotatthil"	A. R. Rahman	Vairamuthu	SPB
1993	Kizhakku Cheemayile	"Aathangara Marame"	A. R. Rahman	Vairamuthu	Mano
1993	Uzhavan	"Maari Mazhai Peyyatho"	A. R. Rahman	Kadhir	Shahul Hameed, G. V. Prakash Kumar
1994	Sindhu Nathi Poo	"Aalamaram"	Soundaryan	Vairamuthu	
1994	Sindhu Nathi Poo	"Aathaadi Enna Odambu"	Soundaryan	Vairamuthu	Shahul Hameed
1994	Paasamalargal	"Shenbaga Poovai"	V. S. Narasimhan	Vairamuthu	SPB
1994	Paasamalargal	"Valarum Valarum"	V. S. Narasimhan		
1994	Paasamalargal	"Azhagana Veedu"	V. S. Narasimhan		
1994	Pondattiye Deivam	"Pombalathan Deivamadi"	Bala Bharathi	Pulamaipithan	Mano
1994	Pondattiye Deivam	"Naan Thaan Di"	Bala Bharathi	Pulamaipithan	Ashalatha
1994	Duet	"Katthirikka Katthirikka"	A. R. Rahman	Vairamuthu	Prasanna
1994	Seevalaperi Pandi	"Kizhakku Sivakayile"	Adithyan	Vairamuthu	Rajagopal, Napolean, P. G. Srikanth
1994	Chinna Madam	"Chinna Chinna"	Sirpy	Vairamuthu	Mano
1994	Chinna Madam	"Chinna Chinna"(Version ll)	Sirpy	Vairamuthu	Mano
1994	Chinna Madam	"Oru Ponnu Nenachha"	Sirpy	Vairamuthu	
1994	Kaadhalan	"Kaatru Kuthirayile"	A. R. Rahman	Vairamuthu	
1994	Kaadhalan	"Indiraiyo Ival Sundariyo"	A. R. Rahman	Vairamuthu	Sunanda, Kalyani Menon, Minmini
1994	Mani Rathnam	"Neerodai Thaalampottu"	Sirpy	Neeraja	Arun Mozhi
1994	Mani Rathnam	"Kuzhainthaikku Pasiyeduthal"	Sirpy	Neeraja	Arun Mozhi
1994	Nammavar	"Udai Oodu Pirakkavillai"	Mahesh Mahadevan	Pulamaipithan	SPB
1994	Nattamai	"Meena Ponnu"	Sirpy	Vairamuthu	Mano
1994	Karuththamma	"Porale Ponnuthaayi"	A. R. Rahman	Vairamuthu	Unni Menon
1994	Pudhiya Mannargal	"Nee Kattum Selai"	A. R. Rahman	Palani Bharathi	T. L. Maharajan
1994	Pudhiya Mannargal	"Vaadi Saathukkodi"	A. R. Rahman	Palani Bharathi	Kalyani Menon
1994	Chinna Pulla	"Pachai Nellu"	Adithyan	Piraisoodan	
1995	Kizhakku Malai	"Nilavukku Piranthu"	Ganesh Ramana		Shahul Hameed
1995	Kizhakku Malai	"Roattila Meyithu"	Ganesh Ramana		Suresh Peters, Anupama
1995	Kizhakku Malai	"Malligai Poovai"	Ganesh Ramana		Mano
1995	Muthu Kulikka Vaarieyala	"Oh Yen Uyire"	Soundaryan		
1995	Bombay	"Malarodu Malaringu"	A. R. Rahman	Vairamuthu	Anuradha Sriram
1995	Bombay	"Idhu Annai Bhoomi"	A. R. Rahman	Vairamuthu	Noel James, Srinivas, Ganga Sitharasu, Anuradha Sriram, Sivanesan, Renuka
1995	Lucky Man	"Akum Baakum"	Adithyan	Vairamuthu	Suresh Peters
1995	Pasumpon	"Adi Aathi"	Vidyasagar	Vairamuthu	K. S. Chithra, P. Jayachandran
1995	Pasumpon	"Thamarai Poovukkum"	Vidyasagar	Vairamuthu	Krishnachandran
1995	Indira	"Ini Achcham Achcham Illai"	A. R. Rahman	Vairamuthu	Anuradha Sriram, G. V. Prakash Kumar, Swetha Mohan, Esther
1995	Murai Maman	"Thenna Marathula"	Vidyasagar	Palani Bharathi	Malaysia Vasudevan
1995	Murai Maman	"Anandam Anandam"	Vidyasagar	Palani Bharathi	P. Unnikrishnan, Manorama
1995	Villadhi Villain	"Bombai Maami"	Vidyasagar	Vairamuthu	Unni Menon
1995	Asuran	"Vathikichu Pathikichu"	Adithyan	Vairamuthu	Adithyan
1995	Paattu Vaathiyar	"Muthamendraal Ennavendru"	Ilaiyaraaja	Vaali	K. J. Yesudas
1995	Mr. Madras	"Antha Otha Maadi"	Vidyasagar	Vaali	Mano
1995	Muthu	"Thillana Thillana"	A. R. Rahman	Vairamuthu	Mano
1995	Neela Kuyil	"Poo Malai Idhu"	Manikka Vinayagam	Vaali	K. J. Yesudas
1995	Neela Kuyil	"Poo Malai Idhu"	Manikka Vinayagam	Vaali	
1995	Neela Kuyil	"Sruthilayam"	Manikka Vinayagam	Vaali	
1995	Maaman Magal	"Jumma Jumma"	Adithyan	Vaali	SPB
1995	Maaman Magal	"Kuyile Kuyil"	Adithyan		
1995	Jameen Kottai	"Ponnu Kulla"	Sirpy	Kalidasan	Unnikrishnan
1995	Murai Mappillai	"Maama Maama"	Swararaj	Vaali	Manivannan, Mano, K. Prabhakaran
1996	Aruva Velu	"Yeamma Intha Rathiri"	Adithyan	Vairamuthu	
1996	Kizhakku Mugam	"Muthu Muthu"	Adithyan	Vairamuthu	Shahul Hameed
1996	Love Birds	"Naalai Ulagam"	A. R. Rahman	Vairamuthu	Unnikrishnan
1996	Parambarai	"Ithu Maalaikkala"	Deva	Kalidasan	SPB
1996	Parambarai	"Vaigasi Maasam"	Deva	Kalidasan	Mano
1996	Ullathai Allitha	"Chittu Chittu Kuruvikku"	Sirpy	Palani Bharathi	Mano
1996	Poove Unakkaga	"Sollamale Yaar Paarthathu"	S. A. Rajkumar	Palani Bharathi	P. Jayachandran
1996	Poove Unakkaga	"Machinichi"	S. A. Rajkumar	Palani Bharathi	T. L. Maharajan, Unnikrishnan
1996	Poove Unakkaga	"Idhayangal Nazhuvuthu"	S. A. Rajkumar	Palani Bharathi	
1996	Rajali	"Kadhal Thamarai"	Aravind		Suresh Peters
1996	Rajali	"Thathiye"	Aravind		Mano
1996	Rajali	"Worng Route"	Aravind		Mansoor Ali Khan
1996	Krishna	"Oh Manmadha"	S. A. Rajkumar		
1996	Avathara Purushan	"Agaya Panthalile"	Sirpy		S. P. Balasubrahmanyam
1996	Sundara Purushan	"Eerakatthu Sundara Purushan"	Deva	Vairamuthu	Unnikrishnan
1996	Enakkoru Magan Pirappan	"En Raasi"	Karthik Raja	Arun Mozhi	Unnikrishnan
1996	Priyam	"Oru Kelvi"	Vidyasagar	Vairamuthu	Unnikrishnan
1996	Vishwanath	"Jil Endru Veesuthu"	Deva	Vaali	Unni Menon
1996	Namma Ooru Raasa	"Ennudaiya Maadappura"	Deva	Kalidasan	Mano
1996	Namma Ooru Raasa	"Amma Amma Maariyamma"	Deva	Muthulingam	
1996	Subhash	"Hero Honda"	Vidyasagar	R. V. Udayakumar	Arjun
1996	Tata Birla	"Priya Unn Tholai"	Vidyasagar	Vaali	SPB
1996	Tata Birla	"Vedhalam Murungai"	Vidyasagar	Vaali	SPB
1996	Alexander	"Rajarajan Naane"	Karthik Raja	Vaali	Mano
1996	Avvai Shanmughi	"Kadhala Kadhala"	Deva	Vaali	Hariharan
1996	Avvai Shanmughi	"Rukku Rukku Rukku"	Deva	Vaali	Kamal Hassan
1996	Kalki	"Poove Nee Aadava"	Deva		
1996	Mr. Romeo	"Mellisaye"	A. R. Rahman	Vairamuthu	Swarnalatha, Srinivas, Unni Menon
1996	Panchalankurichi	"Aana Aavanna"	Deva	Vairamuthu	Krishnaraj
1996	Gnanapazham	"Yaarum Illadha"	K. Bhagyaraj		P. Unnikrishnan
1996	Poomani	"Thol Mela Thol"	Ilaiyaraaja	Palani Bharathi	Ilaiyaraaja
1996	Selva	"Potta Pulla Manasu"	Sirpy	Vaali	Mano
1996	Take It Easy Urvashi	"Thoda Vendum"	Soundaryan		Mano
1997	Dharma Chakkaram	"Maamara Anilo"	Deva	R. V. Udayakumar	
1997	Dharma Chakkaram	"Solaikkulla Kattukkulla"	Deva	R. V. Udayakumar	SPB
1997	Kathirunda Kadhal	"Alai Alai"	Sirpy		Mano
1997	Minsara Kanavu	"Poo Pookum Osai"	A. R. Rahman	Vairamuthu	Malaysia Vasudevan
1997	Arunachalam	"Mathaadu Mathaadu Mallige"	Deva	Palani Bharathi	SPB, Meera, Manorama
1997	Thaali Pudhusu	"Sirage Illatha"	Vidyasagar	Vasan	Harish Raghavendra
1997	Pistha	"Kangalile Oru Kadhal Nila"	S. A. Rajkumar		Mano
1997	Pasamulla Pandiyare	"Oh Lovely"	Deva		Mano
1997	Suryavamsam	"Rosappoo Chinna Rosappoo" (Female)	S. A. Rajkumar	Ra. Ravishankar	
1997	Suryavamsam	"Chalakku Chalakku"	S. A. Rajkumar	Ra. Ravishankar	Arun Mozhi
1997	Suryavamsam	"Thirunaalu Thaerazhaga"	S. A. Rajkumar	Kalaikumar	S. A. Rajkumar
1997	Nandhini	"Laila Laila"	S. A. Rajkumar	Vairamuthu	SPB
1997	Kaadhali	"Yei Chittukuruvi"	Deva	Kalidasan	Kovai Kamala
1997	Pagaivan	"Oh My Butterfly"	Deva	Kalidasan	Krishnaraj
1997	Ganga Gowri	"Kadhal Solla Vanden"	Sirpy	Palani Bharathi	Unnikrishnan
1997	Ganga Gowri	"Poothendrale Vilaiyaadu"	Sirpy	Palani Bharathi	Mano
1997	Paththini	"Aalapuzha"	Deva	Palani Bharathi	Mano
1997	Aahaa..!	"Kozhi Vandhadha"	Deva	Palani Bharathi	Malaysia Vasudevan, Yugendran, Anuradha Sriram
1997	Aahaa..!	"Yehi Hai Right Choice"	Deva	Palani Bharathi	Gopal Rao
1997	Aahaa..!	"Seetha Kalyanam"	Deva	Palani Bharathi	Malaysia Vasudevan, Meera Krishnan, Krishnaraj
1997	Porkkaalam	"Karuvela Kattukkulle"	Deva	Vairamuthu	Arun Mozhi, Anuradha Sriram
1997	Ratchagan	"Chandiranai Thottathu Yaar"	A. R. Rahman	Vairamuthu	Hariharan
1997	Vidukathai	"Hello Hello"	Deva	Vaasan	Sabesh–Murali
1997	Janakiraman	"Kadhal Solla"	Sirpy	Palani Bharathi	Hariharan
1997	Janakiraman	"Yenadi Kannae"	Sirpy	Palani Bharathi	Mano
1997	Kadavul	"Kaathalai"	Ilaiyaraaja	Pulamaipithan	Unnikrishnan
1997	Kadavul	"Poovarasan Poove"	Ilaiyaraaja	Pulamaipithan	Arun Mozhi
1997	Arasiyal	"Hello Nanthalaala"	Vidyasagar	Vaasan	
1997	Arasiyal	"Vaarai En Thozhiyae"	Vidyasagar	Piraisoodan	Swarnalatha, Shubha Mudgal
1997	Kadhalukku Mariyadhai	"Oru Pattampoochi"	Ilaiyaraaja	Palani Bharathi	K. J. Yesudas
1998	Moovendhar	"Cheran Enna"	Sirpy	Arivumathi	Mano
1998	Moovendhar	"Sokku Sundari"	Sirpy		
1998	Ponmanam	"Azhaga Azhaga"	S. A. Rajkumar	Kamakodiyan	SPB, S. A. Rajkumar
1998	Ponmanam	"Pattamboochi"	S. A. Rajkumar	Arivumathi	Unnikrishnan
1998	Udhavikku Varalaamaa	"Ennodu Edho"	Sirpy	Palani Bharathi	Mano
1998	Kondattam	"Minnaladikkum Venmai"	Maragatha Mani	Kalidasan	SPB
1998	Kondattam	"Mai Vizhi"	Maragatha Mani	Kalidasan	SPB
1998	Kondattam	"Unnoduthan Kanavile"	Maragatha Mani	Kalidasan	Mano
1998	Kondattam	"Paeru Nalla Paeru"	Maragatha Mani	Kalidasan	Maragatha Mani, Natarajan, Srinivasan, Minmini, Swarnalatha, Vedha
1998	Velai	"Kunnooru Poochadi"	Yuvan Shankar Raja	Arivumathi	Udit Narayan
1998	Colour Kanavugal	"Tax Free"	Adithyan		
1998	Thulli Thirintha Kaalam	"Tak Tak Tak"	Jayanth		P. Unnikrishnan
1998	Ninaithen Vandhai	"Unnai Ninaithu"	Deva	Vaali	SPB, K. S. Chithra
1998	Kaathala Kaathala	"Saravana Bhava"	Karthik Raja	Vaali	Kamal Haasan, Karthik Raja, Sripriya
1998	Kavalai Padathe Sagodhara	"Pennin Thiruvonam"	Ilaiyaraaja	Panchu Arunachalam	Ilaiyaraaja
1998	Jeans	"Poovukkul Olinthirukkum"	A. R. Rahman	Vairamuthu	Unnikrishnan
1998	Vettu Onnu Thundu Rendu	"Pudhuvaanam"	A K Vasagan	Vairamuthu	
1998	Jolly	"Unnai Thotta Pattampoochi"	Kavi	Vairamuthu	
1998	Harichandra	"Enna Idhu Kanava"	Agosh	Vairamuthu	Mano
1998	Natpukkaga	"Garuda Garuda"	Deva	Kalidasan	Krishnaraj
1998	Dharma	"Manakkum"	Ilaiyaraaja	Pulamaipithan	SPB
1998	Sandhippoma	"Radha Radha"	Deva	Vairamuthu	Hariharan
1998	Kalyana Galatta	"Kummalam"	Yuvan Shankar Raja	Vamanan	Mano, Arun Mozhi
1998	Nilaave Vaa	"Kadalamma Kadalamma"	Vidyasagar	Vairamuthu	P. Jayachandran, Vidyasagar
1998	Unnidathil Ennai Koduthen	"Edho Oru Pattu"	S. A. Rajkumar	Kalaikumar	
1998	Unnidathil Ennai Koduthen	"Vaanambadiyin"	S. A. Rajkumar		
1998	Unnidathil Ennai Koduthen	"Malligai Poove Malligai Poove"	S. A. Rajkumar	Thamarai	P. Unnikrishnan
1998	Thayin Manikodi	"Yahaan Ladki Hai"	Vidyasagar	Vaasan	Vidyasagar
1998	Ellame En Pondattithaan	"Yenunga Yenunga"	Deva	Vaali	
1998	Desiya Geetham	"Ladies Special"	Ilaiyaraaja	Arivumathi	
1998	Desiya Geetham	"Naan Vaakkapattu"	Ilaiyaraaja	Arivumathi	
1998	En Uyir Nee Thaane	"January Nilave"	Deva	Arivumathi	Krishnaraj
1998	En Uyir Nee Thaane	"Padinettu Vayasu"	Deva	Arivumathi	SPB
1998	Simmarasi	"Kumbakonam Santhayile"	S. A. Rajkumar	Vaasan	Krishnaraj
1998	Simmarasi	"Pachcha Manna Thottu"	S. A. Rajkumar	Vaasan	Mano
1998	Pudhumai Pithan	"Sirikkathane Ennai"	Deva	Palani Bharathi	SPB
1998	Guru Paarvai	"Paarvai Paarvai"	Deva	Vaasan	Krishnaraj
1998	Kannathal	"Kamatchi Ammanukku"	Ilaiyaraaja	Arivumathi	
1998	Kannathal	"Pathilenke Solvaay"	Ilaiyaraaja	Ponnadiyan	
1998	Pooveli	"Itharku Peyar"	Bharathwaj	Vairamuthu	Hariharan
1998	Thalaimurai	"Vellimani Thottil Katta"	Ilaiyaraaja	Nandalala	Arun Mozhi, Ilaiyaraaja
1998	Thalaimurai	"Thathi Thathi"	Ilaiyaraaja	Vaasan	
1998	Kaadhal Kavithai	"Hey Konji Pesu"	Ilaiyaraaja	Palani Bharathi	Ilaiyaraaja
1998	Sivappu Nila	"Nee Meena Raasi Ponnu"	Deva	Ponniyin Selvan	Mano
1999	Thullatha Manamum Thullum	"Kakkai Siraginilae"	S. A. Rajkumar	Bharathiyar	
1999	Ninaivirukkum Varai	"Anbae Nee Mayila"	Deva	Palani Bharathi	Unni Menon
1999	Unnai Thedi	"Neethane Neethane"	Deva	Vairamuthu	Hariharan
1999	Chinna Raja	"Hoi Hoi Hoi"	Deva	Vairamuthu	
1999	Ethirum Pudhirum	"Maruthaani Thottu"	Vidyasagar	Vairamuthu	Malaysia Vasudevan
1999	Endrendrum Kadhal	"Jalakku"	Manoj–Gyan	Ponniyin Selvan	S. N. Surendar
1999	Ullathai Killathe	"Sona Sona Ruksona"	Deva		
1999	Chinna Durai	"Neeye Kathi"	Ilaiyaraaja	Palani Bharathi	
1999	Annan	"Aalamarathu Kiliye"	Ilaiyaraaja	Arivumathi	Ilaiyaraaja
1999	Annan	"Vayasu Pulla"	Ilaiyaraaja	Arivumathi	Ilaiyaraaja
1999	Monisha En Monalisa	"Hello Hello"	T. Rajendar		SPB
1999	Periyanna	"Nilave Nilave"	Bharani		
1999	Nilave Mugam Kaattu	"Chittu Parakkuthu"	Ilaiyaraaja	Mu Mehta	Shankar Mahadevan
1999	Poomagal Oorvalam	"Malare Oru Varthai"	Siva	Vairamuthu	Hariharan, K. S. Chithra
1999	Anantha Poongathe	"Solai Kuyil"	Deva	Vairamuthu	Hariharan
1999	Anantha Poongathe	"Solai Kuyil"	Deva	Vairamuthu	
1999	Oruvan	"Vandhachu Vandhachu"	Deva	Vairamuthu	Mano
1999	Oruvan	"O Nandini"	Deva	Vairamuthu	SPB
1999	Oruvan	"Gopala Gopala"	Deva	Vairamuthu	
1999	Sangamam	"Mudhal Murai"	A. R. Rahman	Vairamuthu	Srinivas
1999	Suyamvaram	"Kaathirunthale Raajakumari"	S. A. Rajkumar	Vairamuthu	
1999	Suyamvaram	"Marghazhi Maasathu"	S. A. Rajkumar	Vairamuthu	SPB, Mano, Unnikrishnan
1999	Suyamvaram	"Sekka Sivanthavale"	Sirpy	Vairamuthu	Hariharan
1999	Malabar Police	"En Kannadi Pesavillai"	S. A. Rajkumar	Arivumathi	Unnikrishnan
1999	Poovellam Kettuppar	"Irava Pagala"	Yuvan Shankar Raja	Palani Bharathi	Hariharan
1999	Kannodu Kanbathellam	"Mona Monalisa"	Deva	Vaali	SPB
1999	Nee Varuvai Ena	"Athikaalayil Sevalai"	S. A. Rajkumar	Ravishankar	Unnikrishnan
1999	Amarkkalam	"Sattham Illatha"	Bharathwaj	Vairamuthu	SPB
1999	Jodi	"Oru Poiyyavadhu"	A. R. Rahman	Vairamuthu	Srinivas
1999	Minsara Kanna	"Un Per Solla"	Deva	Na. Muthukumar	Hariharan
1999	Minsara Kanna	"Boy Frienda"	Deva	Kalaikumar	Mano
1999	Minsara Kanna	"Un Per Solla"	Deva	Na. Muthukumar	
1999	Anbulla Kadhalukku	"Gnyapagam Irukkutha"	Deva		P. Unnikrishnan
1999	Kaama	"Jillallal Jillallal"	Adithyan		
1999	Pooparika Varugirom	"Kannum Kannum"	Vidyasagar	Vairamuthu	Srinivas
1999	Pooparika Varugirom	"Ailey Ailey"	Vidyasagar		
1999	Unakkaga Ellam Unakkaga	"Thulli Thulli"	Yuvan Shankar Raja	Palani Bharathi	S. P. B. Charan
1999	Maravathe Kanmaniye	"Koo Koo Kuyilamma"	Mahakumar	Vairamuthu	
1999	Maravathe Kanmaniye	"Ellora Oviyam"	Mahakumar	Vairamuthu	Unnikrishnan, Anuradha Sriram
1999	Jayam	"Aayiram Kan"	Pradeep Ravi	Vairamuthu	
1999	Kannupada Poguthaiya	"Aanandham Aanandham"	S. A. Rajkumar	Vairamuthu	
1999	Taj Mahal	"Chotta Chotta"	A. R. Rahman	Vairamuthu	
1999	Kudumba Sangili	"Nellin Manippol"	Sirpy	Vairamuthu	
1999	Kudumba Sangili	"Petha Manasu"	Sirpy	Vairamuthu	P. Unnikrishnan
1999	Thirupathi Ezhumalai Venkatesa	"Kadhalukku Thoothu Sollu"	S. A. Rajkumar	Vairamuthu	Supraja, P. M. Amrutha
1999	Time	"Kadhal Neethana"	Ilaiyaraaja	Palani Bharathi	Unnikrishnan
1999	Time	"Niram Pirithu"	Ilaiyaraaja	Palani Bharathi	
1999	Unnaruge Naan Irundhal	"Chinna Chinna Poove"	Deva	Palani Bharathi	
1999	Azhagarsamy	"Orange Color"	Deva	Palani Bharathi	Deva
1999	Azhagarsamy	"Pachai Marikozhunthu"	Deva		
1999	Sethu	"Saranam Bhava"	Ilaiyaraaja	Mu Mehta	
1999	Aasaiyil Oru Kaditham	"Vaanilave"	Deva	Palani Bharathi	Srinivas
1999	Manam Virumbuthe Unnai	"Yetho Yetho"	Ilaiyaraaja	Vaali	Hariharan
1999	Paattali	"Kadhal Azhaga"	S. A. Rajkumar	Kalidasan	Hariharan
1999	Paattali	"Chinna Chinna"	S. A. Rajkumar	Kalidasan	Anuradha Sriram
1999	Thaalam	"Kaadhal Illamale"	A. R. Rahman		
1999	Thaalam	"Vaa Mannava"	A. R. Rahman		

=== 2000s ===
Year	Film	Song	Composer(s)	Writer(s)	Co-artist(s)
2000	Kadhal Rojave	"Thottu Thottu"	Ilaiyaraaja	Palani Bharathi	SPB
2000	Vaanathaippola	"Engal Veettil Ella Naalum"	S. A. Rajkumar	Pa. Vijay	SPB, Arun Mozhi
2000	Vaanathaippola	"Vaanil Vennila"	S. A. Rajkumar	Pa. Vijay	
2000	Eazhaiyin Sirippil	"Purave En"	Deva	Palani Bharathi	Hariharan
2000	Eazhaiyin Sirippil	"Purave En"	Deva	Palani Bharathi	Unni Menon
2000	Good Luck	"Kadhal Seiyum"	Manoj–Gyan	Vairamuthu	SPB
2000	Good Luck	"July Pathinaaru Vantha"	Manoj–Gyan	Vairamuthu	Srinivas, K. S. Chithra
2000	Good Luck	"Naane Nee Nee"	Manoj–Gyan	Vairamuthu	Unnikrishnan
2000	Sudhandhiram	"Ennamo Maatram"	S. A. Rajkumar	Kalaikumar	Hariharan
2000	Sudhandhiram	"Varthai Illamal"	S. A. Rajkumar	Kalaikumar	Hariharan
2000	Sudhandhiram	"Mazhai Mazhai"	S. A. Rajkumar	Kalaikumar	Hariharan
2000	Thai Poranthachu	"Ulagathil Ulla"(Duet)	Deva	Gangai Amaran	Unnikrishnan
2000	Thai Poranthachu	"Ulagathil Ulla"(Female)	Deva		
2000	Sandhitha Velai	"Pennkiliye"	Deva	Palani Bharathi	Unnikrishnan
2000	Vallarasu	"Aruppukottai Akka"	Deva	Kalidasan	Hariharan
2000	Veeranadai	"Muthu Muthaa"	Deva	Palani Bharathi	
2000	Kannan Varuvaan	"Kaathukku Pookal"	Sirpy	Pa. Vijay	Hariharan
2000	Kannan Varuvaan	"Kadala Kattu Kuyile"	Sirpy		
2000	Magalirkkaga	"Siragugal Indri"	Varshan	Annadasan	
2000	Kuberan	"Ananda Roja"	S. A. Rajkumar	Arivumathi	Unnikrishnan
2000	Kuberan	"Vaanam Vaazhtha"	S. A. Rajkumar	Arivumathi	
2000	Kuberan	"Nilavil Veedu"	S. A. Rajkumar		
2000	Unakkaga Mattum	"Gopala Site Adichcha"	Bobby Shankar	Pulamaipithan	Dinesh
2000	Unakkaga Mattum	"Vizhiyodu"	Bobby Shankar	Pulamaipithan	Srinivas
2000	Kann Thirandhu Paaramma	"Unnai Thaane"(Happy)	S P Eshwar		
2000	Doubles	"Hey Pondattikkum"	Srikanth Deva	Vairamuthu	Devan Ekambaram
2000	Doubles	"Hey Pondattikkum II"	Srikanth Deva	Vairamuthu	Sukhwinder Singh
2000	Kannaal Pesavaa	"Nenjukulla"	Deva	Pulamaipithan	
2000	Kannaal Pesavaa	"Kannazhage"	Deva	Pulamaipithan	
2000	Maayi	"Nilave Vaan Nilave"	S. A. Rajkumar	Mu Mehta	
2000	Krodham 2	"En Thalaiva"	Deva	Palani Bharathi	Mano
2000	Unnai Kann Theduthey	"Vaada Vaada"	Deva	Palani Bharathi	
2000	Budget Padmanabhan	"Ada Thangam Pola"	S. A. Rajkumar		
2000	Karuvelam Pookkal	"Kaalayila Kan"	Ilaiyaraaja		
2000	Uyirile Kalanthathu	"Uyire Uyire Azhaithathenna"	Deva	Arivumathi	Hariharan
2000	Kannukku Kannaga	"Thulli Thulli Mazhaithuli"	Deva	Muthulingam	
2000	Kannukku Kannaga	"Aanandham Aanandham"	Deva		
2000	Palayathu Amman	"Veppilai Veppilai"	S. A. Rajkumar	Mu Mehta	
2000	Thenali	"Aalangatti Mazhai"	A. R. Rahman	Kalaikumar	Kamal Haasan, Srinivas, Sharanya Srinivas, Silono Rath
2000	Vaanavil	"Holy Holy"	Deva	Vairamuthu	Gopal Rao
2000	Vanna Thamizh Pattu	"Vilaiyattu Vilaiyattu"	S. A. Rajkumar	Vaali	Srinivas, Anuradha Sriram
2000	Snegithiye	"Radhai Manathil"	Vidyasagar	Vairamuthu	K. S. Chithra, Sangeetha Sajith
2000	Snegithiye	"Kalluri Malare"	Vidyasagar	Vairamuthu	K. S. Chithra, Sangeetha Sajith
2000	Snegithiye	"Devadhai Vamsam"	Vidyasagar	Vairamuthu	K. S. Chithra
2000	Snegithiye	"Doora Desam"	Vidyasagar	Vairamuthu	Venugopal
2000	Penngal	"Manasengum Mazhai"	Bharadwaj		
2000	Ennavalle	"Raa Raa Rajakumara"	S. A. Rajkumar	Mu Mehta	Rajesh Krishnan
2001	Friends	"Manjal Poosum"	Ilaiyaraaja	Palani Bharathi	Devan Ekambaram
2001	Friends	"Penkaloda Potti"	Ilaiyaraaja	Palani Bharathi	Hariharan
2001	Friends	"Manjal Poosum"(Film Version)	Ilaiyaraaja		
2001	Vaanchinathan	"Amul Baby"	Karthik Raja	Pa. Vijay	Srinivas
2001	Ullam Kollai Poguthae	"Kavithaigal Sollava"	Karthik Raja	Pa. Vijay	SPB
2001	Piriyadha Varam Vendum	"Dikki Dikki Lona"	S. A. Rajkumar	Mu Mehta	Mano
2001	Piriyadha Varam Vendum	"Vasco Da Gama"	S. A. Rajkumar	Mu Mehta	Devan Ekambaram
2001	Rishi	"Oh Mane Mane Mane"	Yuvan Shankar Raja	Pa. Vijay	
2001	Rishi	"Jumbo Idhu Kadhal"	Yuvan Shankar Raja	Pa. Vijay	S. P. B. Charan
2001	Vinnukum Mannukum	"Aagayam Pookal"	Sirpy	Na. Muthukumar	Unnikrishnan
2001	Vinnukum Mannukum	"Unakenna Unakenna"	Sirpy	Na. Muthukumar	SPB
2001	Vinnukum Mannukum	"Unakenna Unakenna"	Sirpy	Na. Muthukumar	
2001	Dumm Dumm Dumm	"Desingu Raaja"	Karthik Raja	Mu Mehta	Harish Raghavendra
2001	Little John	"Paadava Paadava"	Pravin Mani	Vairamuthu	
2001	Little John	"Lady Don’t Treat Me"	Pravin Mani	Vairamuthu	Srinivas
2001	Seerivarum Kaalai	"Em Manasilaey"	Sirpy	Muthulingam	Mano
2001	Middle Class Madhavan	"Ammamma Thangaadhu"	Dhina	Pa. Vijay	Hariharan
2001	Aanandham	"Gokulathu Radhai"	S. A. Rajkumar	Viveka	Unni Menon, S. P. B. Charan
2001	Aanandham	"Kalyana Vaanil"	S. A. Rajkumar	Viveka	Unni Menon
2001	Love Channel	"Enge Enathu Vennila"	Deva	Palani Bharathi	Unni Menon
2001	Kottai Mariamman	"Sri Ranganatharukku"	Deva		
2001	Lovely	"Vinothamaanavale"	Deva	Palani Bharathi	Hariharan
2001	Dhill	"Un Samayal Arayil"	Vidyasagar	Kabilan	Unnikrishnan
2001	Star	"Rasiga Rasiga"	A. R. Rahman	Piraisoodan	SPB
2001	Super Kudumbam	"Vittu Vittu"	Adithyan		
2001	Poovellam Un Vasam	"Chella Namm Veetukku"	Vidyasagar	Vairamuthu	Malaysia Vasudevan, Harish Raghavendra
2001	Vedham	"Mudhal Poo"	Vidyasagar	Pa. Vijay	Hariharan
2001	Samudhiram	"Pineapple"	Sabesh–Murali	Palani Bharathi	Shankar Mahadevan
2001	Alli Thanda Vaanam	"Vaadi Vaadi Nattukatta"	Vidyasagar	Arivumathi	Shankar Mahadevan
2001	Kabadi Kabadi	"Pappali Pazhame"	Deva		
2001	Kabadi Kabadi	"Kanne Unnai"	Deva		
2001	Mitta Miraasu	"Vannakiliye"	Aslam Mustafa	Palani Bharathi	Srinivas
2001	Aalavandhan	"Un Azhagukku"	Shankar–Ehsaan–Loy	Vairamuthu	Shankar Mahadevan
2001	Kasi	"Rokkam Irukkura Makkal"	Ilaiyaraaja	Muthulingam	Hariharan
2001	Love Marriage	"Roja Malare"	Deva	Arivumathi	Karthik
2001	Manadhai Thirudivittai	"Azhagana Sooriyan"	Yuvan Shankar Raja	Pa. Vijay	
2001	Paarthale Paravasam	"Adhisaya Thirumanam"	A. R. Rahman	Vaali	Sriram Parthasarathy, Kalyani Menon, Sriram Narayanan
2001	Shahjahan	"May Madham"	Mani Sharma	Vairamuthu	Devan Ekambaram
2001	Thavasi	"Desingu Raaja Thaan"	Vidyasagar	Pa. Vijay	SPB
2001	Azhagana Naatkal	"Chik Chik Chinnakiliye"	Deva		
2001	Azhagana Naatkal	"Kadhal Ok"	Deva		
2002	Pammal K. Sambandam	"Sakalakala Vallavane"	Deva	Vaali	Hariharan
2002	Punnagai Desam	"Mazhaiye O Mazhaiye"	S. A. Rajkumar	Pa. Vijay	
2002	Shakalaka Baby	"Senyo Reeta"	S. A. Rajkumar	Pa. Vijay	
2002	Dhaya	"Aan Azhaga"	Bharadwaj	Pa. Vijay	Unnikrishnan
2002	Gummalam	"Kaatre"	Gandhidasan		
2002	Kannathil Muthamittal	"Sundari"	A. R. Rahman	Vairamuthu	Hariharan, Tippu, Karthik, Srimathumitha
2002	Kamarasu	"Pottu Mela"	S. A. Rajkumar	Muthulingam	Krishnaraj
2002	Saptham	"Unthan Pugai Patahai"	Gnana - Laal		
2002	Raajjiyam	"Ore Oru"	Bharadwaj	Snehan	Unnikrishnan
2002	Sri Bannari Amman	"Aathisivan Pathiyada"	T. Rajendar	Snehan	
2002	Thamizh	"Vikkuthe"	Bharadwaj	Snehan	Srinivas
2002	Varushamellam Vasantham	"Adi Anarkali"	Sirpy	Arivumathi	Unnikrishnan
2002	Varushamellam Vasantham	"Enge Andha"	Sirpy	Arivumathi	
2002	Varushamellam Vasantham	"Mudhan Mudhalai"	Sirpy	Arivumathi	Unnikrishnan
2002	Unnai Ninaithu	"Happy New Year"	Sirpy	Kalaikumar	Unnikrishnan
2002	Unnai Ninaithu	"Sil Sil Silala"	Sirpy	Pa. Vijay	Unnikrishnan
2002	Unnai Ninaithu	"Ennai Thalattum"	Sirpy	Pa. Vijay	Unni Menon
2002	Unnai Ninaithu	"Ennai Thalattum"(Solo)	Sirpy	Pa. Vijay	
2002	Nettru Varai Nee Yaaro	"Sevanthi"(Female)	Deva	Pa. Vijay	
2002	Enge Enadhu Kavithai	"Naan Thediya Kavithai"	Bharadwaj	Pa. Vijay	Bharadwaj
2002	Devan	"Thaalaatrum Kaatre"	Ilaiyaraaja		
2002	Ezhumalai	"Chillendru"	Mani Sharma	Thamarai	SPB
2002	Ezhumalai	"Maina Kunjo"	Mani Sharma		Shankar Mahadevan
2002	Thenkasi Pattanam	"Azhagana Ilaman Ondru"	Suresh Peters	Vairamuthu	Suresh Peters
2002	Thenkasi Pattanam	"Thenirukkira Koottukulle"	Suresh Peters	Vairamuthu	Mano
2002	Panchathantiram	"Vandhaen Vandhaen"	Deva	Pa. Vijay	Nithyashree Mahadevan, Kamal Haasan
2002	Yai Nee Romba Azhaga Irukke	"Ini Naanum Naanillai"	Srinivas	Arivumathi	Srinivas, Sunitha Sarathy
2002	Youth	"Adi One Inch Two Inch"	Mani Sharma	Vaali	SPB
2002	Baba	"Maya Maya"	A. R. Rahman	Vaali	Karthik
2002	Ivan	"Thulu Podu"	Ilaiyaraaja	Thamarai	Karthik
2002	Run	"Kadhal Pisase"	Vidyasagar	Pa. Vijay	Udit Narayan
2002	King	"Kadhalagi Kadhalagi"	Dhina		
2002	En Mana Vaanil	"Kuthu Kuthu"	Ilaiyaraaja	Arivumathi	Mano, Karthik
2002	Maaran	"Aanantham Aanantham"	Deva	Pa. Vijay	Unni Menon
2002	Samasthanam	"Koththamalli"	Deva	Pa. Vijay	
2002	Album	"Kadhal Vanoli"	Karthik Raja	Pa. Vijay	Harish Raghavendra
2002	Five Star	"Thiru Thiruda"	Sriram Parasuram	Pa. Vijay	Srinivas
2002	University	"Vaan Mazhai"	Ramesh Vinayagam	Vairamuthu	
2002	Game	"Kuchipudi"	S. P. Venkatesh	Vairamuthu	
2002	Villain	"Thappu Thanda"	Vidyasagar	Vairamuthu	Shankar Mahadevan
2002	Jaya	"Jinjinna Jinjinna"	Bharani		
2002	Bala	"Theendi Theendi"	Yuvan Shankar Raja	Pa. Vijay	Unnikrishnan
2003	Dhool	"Aasai Aasai"	Vidyasagar	Kaduvan	Shankar Mahadevan
2003	Ramachandra	"Chinna Chinna"	Deva	Pa. Vijay	Unnikrishnan
2003	Pop Corn	"Antha Seema Thurai"	Yuvan Shankar Raja	Vaali	Hariharan, Manikka Vinayagam
2003	Aasai Aasaiyai	"Kadhal Oru"	Mani Sharma		
2003	Kadhaludan	"Pookalin Kathinile"	S. A. Rajkumar	Kalaikumar	Karthik
2003	Kadhaludan	"Uchi Kilayile"	S. A. Rajkumar	Kalaikumar	Srinivas, Rajakumaran
2003	Yes Madam	"Saami Mele Sathiyam"	Bharani	Pa. Vijay	Hariharan
2003	Military	"Ammamma"	Deva	Palani Bharathi	Srinivas
2003	Kadhal Sadugudu	"Meghathil Ondrai Nindrom"	Deva	Pa. Vijay	Hariharan
2003	Arasu	"Malligai Malligai"	Mani Sharma	Pa. Vijay	Vijay Yesudas
2003	Banda Paramasivam	"Panchumala"	Sirpy	Ravishankar	Ranjith
2003	Banda Paramasivam	"Tajmahal"	Sirpy	Ravishankar	Unnikrishnan
2003	Well Done	"Kuyil Koovuthu"	Vidyasagar	Pa. Vijay	Unnikrishnan
2003	Indru Mudhal	"Vaana Villa"	Deva	Na. Muthukumar	Karthik
2003	Parasuram	"Dholna Dholna"	A. R. Rahman	Pa. Vijay	Hariharan
2003	Parasuram	"Muppadhu Nimidam"	A. R. Rahman	Vairamuthu	Unnikrishnan
2003	Nala Damayanthi	"Thirumangalya Dharanam"	Ramesh Vinayagam	Na. Muthukumar	Sriram Parthasarathy, Saijanani
2003	Paarai	"Naan Oru Kanaa Kanden"	Sabesh Murali	Vairamuthu	Harish Raghavendra
2003	Kadhal Kondein	"Nenjodu"	Yuvan Shankar Raja	Na. Muthukumar	Unnikrishnan
2003	Priyamaana Thozhi	"Maankuttiye"	S. A. Rajkumar	Pa. Vijay	Hariharan
2003	Aahaa Ethanai Azhagu	"Ahaa Ethanai Azhagu"	Vidyasagar		
2003	Kadhal Kisu Kisu	"Kadhal Arimugama"	Vidyasagar		
2003	Thithikudhe	"Sillendra Theepori"	Vidyasagar	Pa. Vijay	
2003	Eera Nilam	"Karisakkattu"	Sirpy	Na. Muthukumar	Sirpy
2003	Diwan	"Ayyayyo"	S. A. Rajkumar	Pa. Vijay	Tippu
2003	Alai	"Nee Oru Desam"	Vidyasagar	Pa. Vijay	KK
2003	Kaiyodu Kai	"Sugam Idhu"	Banapathra		
2003	Three Roses	"Dil Se Pyar"	Karthik Raja	Palani Bharathi	Karthik
2003	Three Roses	"Sevvai Dosham"	Karthik Raja	Palani Bharathi	Karthik, Swetha Mohan
2003	Anjaneya	"Agapporulaa"	Mani Sharma	Vairamuthu	Unnikrishnan
2003	Ottran	"Oru Paarvai"	Pravin Mani	Pa. Vijay	Srinivas
2003	Ottran	"En Kanave"	Pravin Mani	Pa. Vijay	Srinivas
2003	Thirumalai	"Azhagooril Poothavale"	Vidyasagar	Pa. Vijay	SPB
2003	Iyarkai	"Pazhaya Kural"	Vidyasagar	Pa. Vijay	
2003	Anbe Un Vasam	"Yengaavathu"	Dhina		Shankar Mahadevan
2003	Thathi Thavadhu Manasu	"Kanniley"	Deva		
2003	Indru	"Karthikai Aanavale"	Deva	Yugabharathi	Harish Raghavendra
2004	Engal Anna	"Kadhal Dushyantha"	Deva	Yugabharathi	Karthik
2004	Ennavo Pudichirukku	"Thithike Thithike"	Subhash Jawahar	Rasi Azhagappan	Tippu
2004	Ennavo Pudichirukku	"Kasukku"	Subhash Jawahar	Sukumar	Karthik
2004	Gambeeram	"Naanaga Naan"	Mani Sharma	Pa. Vijay	Vijay Yesudas
2004	Jairam	"Un Kaiyyil"	Anoop Rubens	Yugabharathi	
2004	Ghilli	"Kokkara Kokkarakko"	Vidyasagar	Kabilan	Udit Narayan
2004	Ghilli	"Kadhala Kadhala"	Vidyasagar		
2004	Aethirree	"Kadhal Vandhu"	Yuvan Shankar Raja	Kalidasan	Ranjith
2004	Aaytha Ezhuthu	"Nenjam Ellam"	A. R. Rahman	Vairamuthu	Adnan Sami
2004	Maanasthan	"Un E Mail"	S. A. Rajkumar		
2004	Machi	"Thodu Thodu"	A. R. Reihana	Kabilan	
2004	New	"Sakkara Inikkira Sakkara"	A. R. Rahman	Vaali	SPB
2004	Sullan	"Yaaro Nee"	Vidyasagar	Yugabharathi	Hariharan
2004	Kudaikul Mazhai	"Oru Kottaikkul"	Karthik Raja	Na. Muthukumar	Ranjith, Suchitra
2004	Vishwa Thulasi	"Mayakkama"	M. S. Viswanathan		
2005	Ji	"Kiliye Kiliye"	Vidyasagar	Yugabharathi	Udit Narayan
2005	Mannin Maindhan	"Yeamma Yeamma"	Bharadwaj	Karunanidhi	Tippu
2005	London	"Badavaa"	Vidyasagar	Yugabharathi	Vijay Yesudas
2005	Chandramukhi	"Annanoda Paattu"	Vidyasagar	Kabilan	KK, Karthik, Chinnaponnu
2005	Arinthum Ariyamalum	"Yela Yela"	Yuvan Shankar Raja	Snehan	Ranjith
2005	Daas	"Shaheeba Shaheeba"	Yuvan Shankar Raja	Pa. Vijay	Hariharan
2005	Ponniyin Selvan	"Kadhal Poonga"	Vidyasagar	Kabilan	Udit Narayan
2005	Ponniyin Selvan	"Kola Kolayaa"	Vidyasagar	Kabilan	KK
2005	Oru Kalluriyin Kathai	"Kangal Kandadhu"	Yuvan Shankar Raja	Na. Muthukumar	KK
2005	Ghajini	"Rangola Hola"	Harris Jayaraj	Kabilan	Shankar Mahadevan
2005	Kasthuri Maan	"Nethu Varaikkum"	Ilaiyaraaja	Vaali	
2005	Sandakozhi	"Ketta Kodukkura Bhoomi"	Yuvan Shankar Raja	Thamarai	Jassie Gift, Chinmayi, Ganga Sitharasu
2005	Karpanai	Pennai Naan	Santosh Jayaraj		Harish Raghavendra
2006	Paramasivan	"Oru Kili"	Vidyasagar	Yugabharathi	Madhu Balakrishnan
2006	Aathi	"Ennai Konja Konja"	Vidyasagar	Pa. Vijay	Hariharan
2006	Aathi	"Lealakku Lealakku"	Vidyasagar	Pa. Vijay	KK
2006	Pasa Kiligal	"Thangai Endra"	Vidyasagar	Pa. Vijay	Tippu, Karthik, Manorama
2006	Pasa Kiligal	"Meesai Mutham"	Vidyasagar	Pa. Vijay	Tippu
2006	Chithiram Pesuthadi	"Idam Porul Paarthu"	Sundar C. Babu	Pa. Vijay	Karthik
2006	June R	"Mazhaye Mazhaye"	Sharreth	Yugabharathi	
2006	Azhagai Irukkirai Bayamai Irukkirathu	"Kadhalai Pirappadhu"	Yuvan Shankar Raja	Na. Muthukumar	Bharath, Devan, Premji Amaran, Ranjith, Suchitra, Pushpavanam Kuppusamy, Yuvan Shankar Raja, Paravai Muniyamma, Naveen Madhav
2006	Jerry	"Kanava"	Ramesh Vinayagam	Yugabharathi	
2006	Thoothukudi	"Kozhukkatta"	Praveen Mani	Yugabharathi	Karthik
2006	Rendu	"Nee En Thozhiya"	D. Imman	Pa. Vijay	Naresh Iyer
2006	Thullura Vayasu	"Yetho Yetho" (Female version)	Karthik Raja		
2006	Sivappathigaram	"Attrai Thingal"	Vidyasagar	Yugabharathi	Madhu Balakrishnan
2006	Nenjil Jil Jil	"Unnakagathaane Uyir Vazhgiren"	D. Imman	Yugabharathi	Unnikrishnan
2006	Aadu Puli Attam	"Maya Kanna"	Pravin Mani	Pa. Vijay	
2006	Thiruvilaiyaadal Aarambam	"Theriyame Parthuputten"	D. Imman	Thiraivannan	Ranjith
2006	Poi	"Hitler Penne"	Vidyasagar	Yugabharathi	Tippu
2006	Adaikalam	"Ada Konda Cheval Olikka"	Sabesh–Murali	Yugabharathi	Madhu Balakrishnan
2007	Mozhi	"Kaatrin Mozhi"	Vidyasagar	Vairamuthu	
2007	Guru	"Ey Maanburu Mangaiye"	A. R. Rahman	Vairamuthu	Srinivas, A. R. Rahman
2007	Sabari	"Avanna Aakanna"	Mani Sharma	Yugabharathi	Tippu
2007	Thee Nagar	"Potta Pulla Venumadi"	Jassie Gift	Yugabharathi	Prasanna
2007	Thee Nagar	"Thaliyum Vendam"	Jassie Gift	Yugabharathi	Naveen
2007	Thottal Poo Malarum	"Vaadi Vambu Penne"	Yuvan Shankar Raja	Vaali	
2007	Vel	"Kovakkara Kiliye"	Yuvan Shankar Raja	Na. Muthukumar	Tippu
2008	Vaitheeswaran	"Mudhal Murai"	Srikanth Deva	Na. Muthukumar	Unnikrishnan
2008	Kuselan	Sollamma	G. V. Prakash Kumar	Pa. Vijay	Hariharan, Baby Ranjini, Baby Pooja
2008	Dhaam Dhoom	"Uyaalalo Uyaalalo"	Harris Jayaraj	Pa. Vijay	Kailash Kher
2008	Iyakkam	"Veecharuva Kottaiyila"	Pravin Mani	Ilaya Kamban	Swarnalatha
2009	Kadhalna Summa Illai	"Ennamo Seidhai"	Vidyasagar	Vairamuthu	
2009	Kadhalna Summa Illai	"Samayame"	Vidyasagar	Vairamuthu	
2009	Indira Vizha	"Mogamma"	Yathish Mahadev	Vairamuthu	Hariharan
2009	Ilamai Idho Idho	"Kadhal"	Vidyasagar	Pa. Vijay	

=== 2010–present ===
Year	Film	Song	Composer(s)	Writer(s)	Co-artist(s)
2010	Maanja Velu	"Maanja Maanja"	Mani Sharma	Pa. Vijay	Tippu
2010	Chikku Bukku	"Vizhi Oru Paadhi"	Colonial Cousins	Vaali	Adnan Sami
2011	Thambikottai	"Thambikottai Kanaga"	D. Imman	Viveka	Jassie Gift, Nrithya Mariya Andrews
2011	Aadu Puli	"Unnai Ninaithadume"	Sundar C Babu	Kalaikumar	Hariharan
2011	Sadhurangam	"Ambuli Mama"	Vidyasagar	Kalaikumar	KK
2012	Sooriya Nagaram	"Manmadha Kadhal"	Fen Viallie	Vairamuthu	Karthik
2015	Irandu Manam Vendum	"Mazhai Nindrum (duet)"	Muhammad Ali	Pa. Vijay	Manikandan
2015	Irandu Manam Vendum	"Mazhai Nindrum (solo)"	Muhammad Ali	Pa. Vijay	

== Sources ==
- Ramachandran, Naman (2014) [2012]. Rajinikanth: The Definitive Biography. New Delhi: Penguin Books. ISBN 978-0-14-342111-5.
