= List of Tamil films of 1996 =

A list of films produced in the Tamil film industry in India in 1996 by release date.

== Movies ==
Opening		Title	Director	Cast	Production	Music Director
J A N	15	Aruva Velu	P. S. Bharathi Kannan	Nassar, Urvashi	Goodwill Movies	Adithyan
J A N	15	Coimbatore Mappillai	C. Ranganathan	Vijay, Sanghavi	Shree Vijayalakshmi Movieland	Vidyasagar
J A N	15	Kizhakku Mugam	M. Anna Thurai	Karthik, Reshma	Thai Films International	Adithyan
J A N	15	Love Birds	P. Vasu	Prabhu Deva, Nagma, Vadivelu	Pyramid Films	A. R. Rahman
J A N	15	Parambarai	K. S. Ravikumar	Prabhu, Roja	Malar Films	Deva
J A N	15	Thayagam	A. R. Ramesh	Vijayakanth, Ranjitha	Seranaadu Movie Creations	Deva
J A N	15	Thirumbi Paar	Rama Narayanan	Saravanan, Yuvarani	Sri Thenandal Films	Deva
J A N	15	Ullathai Allitha	Sundar C	Karthik, Rambha, Goundamani	Ganga Gowri Productions	Sirpy
J A N	15	Vaanmathi	Agathiyan	Ajith Kumar, Swathi	Sivashakthi Movie Makers	Deva
J A N	26	Mahaprabhu	A. Venkatesh	Sarath Kumar, Sukanya, Vineetha	Sri Sai Theja Films	Deva
J A N	26	Vaikarai Pookkal	E. Mu. Vetrivalan	Raja, Rajashri, Ponvannan, Annam	Navachitra Cine Arts	Devendran
F E B	5	Take It Easy Urvashi	K. K. Rajsirpy	Vignesh, Amirtha, Rajeshwari	Kalai Sirpy	Soundaryan
F E B	9	Amman Kovil Vaasalile	Ramarajan	Ramarajan, Sangita	Mahalakshmi Film International	Sirpy
F E B	9	Meendum Savithri	Visu	Raja, Revathi	Vijaya Combines	Devendran
F E B	9	Nattupura Pattu	Kasthuri Raja	Selva, Sivakumar, Khushbu	Kasthoori Manga Creations	Ilaiyaraaja
F E B	15	Poove Unakkaga	Vikraman	Vijay, Sangita	Super Good Films	S. A. Rajkumar
F E B	16	Musthaffaa	R. Aravindraj	Napoleon, Ranjitha	S. G. S. Cine Arts International	Vidyasagar
F E B	18	Kalloori Vaasal	Pavithran	Ajith Kumar, Pooja Bhatt, Prashanth, Devayani	Aanand Associates	Deva
M A R	7	Vaazhga Jananayagam	E. Ramdoss	Mansoor Ali Khan, Pragathi	Raj Kennedy Films	Mansoor Ali Khan
M A R	15	Summa Irunga Machan	S. N. Prasad	Pandiarajan, Pragathi, Divyasri	Maruthi Art Films	Deva
M A R	15	Suriya Raja	Senthamizh Selvan	C. S. Thamizh, Preetha	C. J. Films	Mahesh
M A R	22	Puthiya Parasakthi	Gowri Rajan	Selva, Sukanya, Napoleon	Anitha Films	Deva
M A R	22	Vasantha Vaasal	M. R	Vijay, Swathi	Kumar Movies	Masa
A P R	5	Irattai Roja	Keyaar	Ramki, Khushbu, Urvashi	Devi Kamal Films	Ilaiyaraaja
A P R	12	Mappillai Manasu Poopola	Kuruvikkarambai Shanmugam	Pandiarajan, Yuvarani	Kuru Kalaikkoodam	Deva
A P R	12	Maanbumigu Maanavan	S. A. Chandrasekhar	Vijay, Swapna Bedi	Seventh Channel Communications	Deva
A P R	12	Siraichalai	Priyadarshan	Mohanlal, Prabhu, Tabu, Amrish Puri	Pranavam Arts International	Ilaiyaraaja
A P R	13	Kaalam Maari Pochu	V. Sekhar	Pandiarajan, Sangita	Thiruvalluvar Kalaikkoodam	Deva
A P R	19	Rajali	Velu Prabhakaran	Ramki, Roja	Motherland Movies International	Aravind
A P R	19	Sengottai	C. V. Sasikumar	Arjun, Meena, Rambha	Super Good Films	Vidyasagar
M A Y	9	Indian	Shankar	Kamal Haasan, Manisha Koirala, Urmila Matondkar, Sukanya, Goundamani	Sri Surya Movies	A. R. Rahman
M A Y	10	Pudhu Nilavu	Vishnuhasan	Jayaram, Vineetha	Rajlakshmi Cine Medias	Deva
M A Y	17	Aavathum Pennale Azhivathum Pennale	Senthilnathan	Arun Pandian, Rajashri	Tamil Annai Cine Creations	Bala Bharathi
J U N	1	Anthimanthaarai	Bharathiraja	Vijayakumar, Jayasudha, Sanghavi	Megaa Movies	A. R. Rahman
J U N	7	Katta Panchayathu	R. Raghu	Karthik, Kanaka	M. R. Enterprises	Ilaiyaraaja
J U N	7	Krishna	Raja Krishnamoorthy	Prashanth, Heera	Unique Creations	S. A. Rajkumar
J U N	28	Avathara Purushan	Pandiyan Arivali	Ranjith, Anand, Sivaranjani	Jagannathan Productions	Sirpy
J U N	28	Minor Mappillai	V. C. Guhanathan	Ajith Kumar, Keerthana, Subhashri	Victory Movies	Isaivanan
J U L	5	Veettukulle Thiruvizha	K. R. S. Jawahar	Anand Babu, Sanghavi, Rohini, Vinodhini	Sundar Art Film International	Deva
J U L	12	Kadhal Kottai	Agathiyan	Ajith Kumar, Devayani, Heera	Sivashakthi Movie Makers	Deva
J U L	12	Sundara Purushan	D. Sabapathy	Livingston, Rambha	Super Good Films	Sirpy
J U L	19	Crime	Sukumar	Venki, Shanti	United Universal Creations	Raja
A U G	2	En Aasai Thangachi	K. Shanmuga Mani	Ramki, Balambika	Raams Movies	T. Rajendar
A U G	2	Tamizh Selvan	Bharathiraja	Vijayakanth, Roja	Raaj Films International	Deva
A U G	2	Vetri Mugam	Thennavan	Vignesh, Keerthana, Roopa Sree	Raja Rajan Cine Arts	Vasantha Rajan
A U G	9	Poovarasan	Gokula Krishnan	Karthik, Rachana Banerjee	Taj International	Ilaiyaraaja
A U G	15	Enakkoru Magan Pirappan	K. R.	Ramki, Khushbu	Pyramid Films International	Karthik Raja
A U G	16	Vishwanath	K. Goutham	Saravanan, Mohini, Swathi	Janaki Ammal Movies	Deva
A U G	23	Kaadhal Desam	Kathir	Vineeth, Abbas, Tabu	Gentleman Film International	A. R. Rahman
A U G	29	Mettukudi	Sundar C	Karthik, Nagma, Goundamani	Ganga Gowri Productions	Sirpy
S E P	6	Manikkam	K. V. Pandian	Rajkiran, Vanitha Vijayakumar	Amma Creations	Karthik Raja
S E P	6	Sivasakthi	Suresh Krissna	Sathyaraj, Prabhu, Rambha	M. G. Pictures	Deva
S E P	9	Priyam	N. Pandian	Arun Kumar, Mantra	Kasthuri Film International	Vidyasagar
S E P	16	Vetri Vinayagar	K. Shankar	Radha Ravi, Urvashi	Ammu Creations	M. S. Viswanathan
S E P	19	Namma Ooru Raasa	Ramarajan	Ramarajan, Sangita	Nalini Cine Arts	Sirpy
S E P	20	Ilamai Rojakkal	S. Manikandan	Bhaskaran, Chandrika	Vijaya Cine Enterprises	Rajamani
S E P	20	Subash	R. V. Udayakumar	Arjun, Revathi	Sivasree Pictures	Vidyasagar
S E P	27	Parivattam	T. K. Rajendran	Jayaram, Sukanya	Iyannar Cine Arts	Deva
O C T	3	Kodugal Illatha Kolam	L. Balu	Ramakrishnan, Sujatha	Salem Palanivel Murugan Movies	Devaraj
O C T	4	Tata Birla	C. Ranganathan	Parthiban, Rachana Banerjee, Goundamani	Shree Vijayalakshmi Movieland	Vidyasagar
O C T	11	Andha Naal	Vishnu Priyan	Prem, Raja, Mohini	Empire Movies	Soundaryan
O C T	25	Thuraimugam	K. Rajeshwar	C. Arunpandian, Shobana	Megnam Productions	Adithyan
N O V	10	Alexander	Keyaar	Vijayakanth, Sangita	P. A. Art Productions	Karthik Raja
N O V	10	Avvai Shanmugi	K. S. Ravikumar	Kamal Haasan, Meena, Heera, Gemini Ganesan	Sree Mahalakshmi Combines	Deva
N O V	10	Gokulathil Seethai	Agathiyan	Karthik, Suvalakshmi	Lakshmi Movie Makers	Deva
N O V	10	Kalki	K. Balachander	Rahman, Shruti, Geetha, Prakash Raj	Kavithalayaa Productions	Deva
N O V	10	Mr. Romeo	K. S. Ravi	Prabhu Deva, Madhubala, Shilpa Shetty, Vadivelu	Super Good Films	A. R. Rahman
N O V	10	Nethaji	G. Kicha	Sarath Kumar, Lisa Ray	Kamalam Movies	Vidyasagar
N O V	10	Panchalankurichi	Seeman	Prabhu, Madhubala	K. B. Films	Deva
N O V	10	Senathipathi	M. Rathnakumar	Sathyaraj, Soundarya, Sukanya	Malar Films	Deva
N O V	10	Vasantham	T. S. Ravivarman	Rahman, Nirosha	Thirumagal Movieland	Ilaiyaraaja
N O V	10	Gnanapazham	R. P. Vishwam	K. Bhagyaraj, Sukanya	Bagavathi Creations	K. Bhagyaraj
D E C	6	Gopala Gopala	Pandiarajan	Pandiarajan, Khushbu	Roja Combines	Deva
D E C	6	Poomani	Mu. Kalanjiyam	Murali, Devayani	Aananth Movieland	Ilaiyaraaja
D E C	6	Purushan Pondatti	N. K. Viswanathan	Pandiarajan, Ranjitha	Sundar Theatres	Sirpy
D E C	12	Selva	A. Venkatesh	Vijay, Swathi	A. R. S. International	Sirpy
D E C	13	Karuppu Roja	J. Paneer	Ramki, Amar Siddique, Yosika, Vineetha	Ayngaran International	M. S. V. Raja
D E C	27	Pudhiya Ulagam	Ilayavan	Rioz, Shanthi	Fathima Nachiyar Films	Raj Bhaskar

== Awards ==
Category/Organization	Cinema Express Awards January 1999	Dinakaran Cinema Awards 12 April 1998	Filmfare Awards South October 1997	Tamil Nadu State Film Awards 9 January 1998
Best Film	Indian / Kadhal Kottai		Indian	Indian
Best Director			Agathiyan; Kadhal Kottai	Agathiyan; Kadhal Kottai
Best Actor	Kamal Haasan; Indian		Kamal Haasan; Indian	Kamal Haasan; Indian
Best Actress	Khushbu / Meena; Irattai Roja / Avvai Shanmughi		Shruti; Kalki	Shruti; Kalki
Best Music Director	A. R. Rahman; Kadhal Desam		A. R. Rahman; Kadhal Desam	A. R. Rahman; Minsara Kanavu (1997)

== Notable deaths ==
- Silk Smitha - South Indian Actress.
- V. N. Janaki - South Indian Actress and Former Chief Minister of Tamil Nadu.
