= Maa Manithan (1995 film) =

- Directed by: Mardhananda (Gunasekharan)
- Written by: Mardhananda (Gunasekharan)
- Starring: Napoleon; Vineetha
- Cinematography: Karthik Raja
- Music by: Soundaryan; Adithyan
- Production company: Nivethika Cine Arts
- Distributed by: B4U Entertainment
- Release date: 17 November 1995
- Country: India
- Language: Tamil

Maa Manithan (transl. Great human) is a 1995 Indian Tamil-language romantic drama film directed by Mardhananda, starring Napoleon and Vineetha. It was released on 17 November 1995.

== Cast ==
- Napoleon as Nagu
- Vineetha as Doctor
- Raghuvaran as Sigamani
- Goundamani as Mr. Dinar / Vettiyan
- Senthil
- Alex
- Valsa as Nagu's wife
- Raman as Doctor's father
- Priyanka as Sigamani's wife
- Pazhani as Broker
- Suryakanth as Broker
- Madhan Bob as Police inspector

== Soundtrack ==
The music was composed by Soundaryan and Adithyan.

Track listing
No.	Title	Music	Singer(s)	Length
1.	"Indruthan Puthiyathoru"	Adithyan	Mano, Swarnalatha	5:05
2.	"Theriyatha Eval Mana"	Soundaryan	Sundhar, Sujatha	4:43
3.	"Thangame"	Soundaryan	K. S. Rajagopal, Theni Kunjarammal	5:06
4.	"Nanea Pudhu Raaghame"	Soundaryan	S. Janaki	4:58
5.	"Kottungu Komme"	Adithyan	S. P. Balasubrahmanyam, S. Janaki	4:44
Total length:				24:36

== Reception ==
D. S. Ramanujam of The Hindu wrote that "Napoleon is equally good in the action and melodrama loaded scenes with Vinitha just ambling along. Raghuvaran, Alex, Suryakanth, Valsa (the hero's unfortunate wife) and Raman (doctor's father) provide the wanted support. Karthik Raja's outdoor cinematography is quite pleasing.
