= Cheran Chozhan Pandian =

- Directed by: Senthamizhan
- Written by: Senthamizhan
- Produced by: R. Krishnamurthy
- Starring: Ranjith; Anand Babu; Vadivelu
- Cinematography: I. Rajendraprasad
- Edited by: K. P. K. Ravichandar
- Music by: Soundaryan
- Production company: K. C. R. Creations
- Release date: 25 December 1998
- Running time: 130 minutes
- Country: India
- Language: Tamil

Cheran Chozhan Pandian is a 1998 Indian Tamil language comedy film directed by Senthamizhan, who had previously directed the film Sindhu Nathi Poo (1994). The film stars Ranjith, Anand Babu and Vadivelu. It was released on 25 December 1998. Two years after release, the producers were given a ₹5 lakh (equivalent to ₹21 lakh or US$24,000 in 2023) subsidy by the Tamil Nadu government along with several other films.

== Plot ==
Cheran (Ranjith), Chozhan (Anand Babu) and Pandian (Vadivelu) are arrested for different crimes and they are immediately released by a kind-hearted police officer (Mansoor Ali Khan). The three men decide to turn their lives around and become good men, but they cross a corrupted politician's path named Swamy (Vasu Vikram) which gives them a reason to reconsider. The three friends fall in love with Gayathri (Mohini), Swamy's sister, who becomes their close friend.

== Cast ==
- Ranjith as Cheran
- Anand Babu as Chozhan
- Vadivelu as Pandian
- Mohini as Gayathri
- Lashmipathiraj as Krishna
- Mansoor Ali Khan
- Vasu Vikram as Swamy
- Junior Balaiah
- Oru Viral Krishna Rao as Vanagamudi
- Madhan Bob
- S. R. Veeraraghavan
- Chitti Babu
- Thavakkalai
- Alphonsa
- Shakeela

== Soundtrack ==
The soundtrack was composed by Soundaryan, with lyrics written by Alamelu Muthulingam.

Song	Singer(s)	Duration
"Jeans Pantukulle"	Subha	4:16
"Kadalicha Ponnu"	S. N. Surendar, Arunmozhi, Shahul Hameed	4:13
"Madras Electric"	Mano, Swarnalatha	5:12
"Nam Vazhvile"	Jayachandran, K. S. Chithra	5:12
"Thirunelveli Halwa"	Sirkazhi G. Sivachidambaram, Krishnaraj, Harini	5:12

== Reception ==
D. S. Ramanujam of The Hindu wrote that the director "shows a flair for working on the comedy track than on the drama, the concluding portions being cinematic". He also appreciated the background score.
