= Vandicholai Chinraasu =

- Poster
- Directed by: Manoj Kumar
- Written by: Manoj Kumar; Sivaram Gandhi (dialogues)
- Produced by: Thirupur Mani
- Starring: Sathyaraj; Sukanya; Sivaranjani
- Cinematography: Lakshmi Balan
- Edited by: M. N. Raja
- Music by: A. R. Rahman
- Production company: Vivekananda Pictures
- Release date: 15 April 1994
- Country: India
- Language: Tamil

Vandicholai Chinraasu is a 1994 Indian Tamil-language masala film directed and co-written by Manoj Kumar, and produced by Vivekananda Pictures. The film stars Sathyaraj, Sukanya and Sivaranjani. It was released on 15 April 1994, and received mixed reviews from critics. It was dubbed into Telugu as Bobbili Paparayudu.

== Plot ==
Chinnrasu lives with his father Rathnasamy and sister Kalyani. Rathnasamy works in the forest office as a driver. Chinnrasu has an aim to become a district forest officer. Due to some problem, Rathnasamy gets a transfer order, and the family shifts to Vandicholai town. The first plot of the film showcases the current situation of Chinnrasu. The movie starts from a scene where Chinnrasu is in jail and will be hanged to death in a couple of months. Hearing this, Chinnrasu remembers his past life and how he gets such a punishment.

== Cast ==
- Sathyaraj as Chinraasu
- Sukanya as Parvathi
- Sivaranjani as Kalyani
- Hariraj as Shankar
- Anandaraj as Santhanapandian
- Goundamani as Kittu
- Delhi Ganesh as Rathnasamy
- S. S. Chandran
- Thalapathy Dinesh
- Vichithra
- Bhavani
- Vijay Krishnaraj as Jailer
- Baby Sridevi as Lakshmi
- Chitti
- Yuvasri
- Premi

== Soundtrack ==
The soundtrack was composed by A. R. Rahman. For the dubbed Telugu version Bobbili Paparayudu, lyrics were written by Vennelakanti. The song "Senthamizh Naatu Thamizhachiye", despite its popularity, has received criticism for its perceived sexist and misogynistic lyrics.

Tamil
No.	Title	Lyrics	Singer(s)	Length
1.	"Senthamizh Naatu Thamizhachiye"	Vairamuthu	Shahul Hameed	4:17
2.	"Chitthirai Nilavu"	Vairamuthu	Jayachandran, Minmini	4:51
3.	"Ye Muthu Pappa"	Vairamuthu	Swarnalatha, Malgudi Subha	5:01
4.	"Edhu Sugam Sugam Adhu Veendum Veendum"	Pulamaipithan	Vani Jayaram S. P. Balasubrahmanyam	4:25
5.	"Barota Barota"	Na. Kamarasan	S. Janaki S. P. Balasubrahmanyam, Sujatha Mohan	4:34
6.	"Chinna Mayile"	Title Song	Shahul Hameed	2:17
Total length:				23:17

Telugu track listing
No.	Title	Singer(s)	Length
1.	"Achu Telugu"	S. P. Balasubrahmanyam	4:12
2.	"Muddu Mama"	Swarnalatha, Malgudi Subha	4:55
3.	"Singarayya Konda"	S. P. Balasubrahmanyam, Malgudi Subha	4:32
4.	"Tholi Sukham Sukham"	S. P. Balasubrahmanyam, Sujatha	4:34
5.	"Tharaka Cheluvu"	S. P. Balasubrahmanyam, Swarnalatha	4:46
Total length:			22:59

== Release and reception ==
Vandicholai Chinraasu was released on 15 April 1994, and received mixed reviews from critics. The Indian Express wrote, "There is nothing new in the story-line. Nor in the scenes. The performance are quite listless". K. Vijiyan of New Straits Times wrote that the film "is for die-hard Sathyaraj fans". R. P. R. of Kalki felt Sathyaraj's acting prowess was wasted. For the film's release in Malaysia, the last 20 minutes were deleted by the Film Censorship Board of Malaysia.
