= Saranamanthram =

Studio album by Kamalan
- Released: November 17, 2009
- Genre: Devotional
- Length: 55 Mins
- Label: Maruthi Cassets
- Producer: Madhu Vijayan, Jais, Music Factory

Saranamanthram is a Hindu devotional Songs album in Malayalam. The songs dedicated to Lord Ayyappa, are composed and arranged by Music Director Kamalan. The album is based on Carnatic Music, and lyrics written by B. K. Harinarayanan. The album is released in Kerala state in India.

Unni Menon is the lead singer in this record. Voices of noted singers like Sriram (Palghat Sriram), Classmates fame Devanand, Viswanath and Idea Star Singer Sannidhanandan are also featured in this album.

== Tracks ==
- 1. Slokam - Unni Menon
- 2. Sivanandana Nin - Unni Menon
- 3. Namamanthrasudhasaram- Devanand
- 4. Pambayil - Viswanath
- 5. Ayyane Ponnayyane - Unni Menon
- 6. Manjin Pularkalam - Devananth
- 7. Pettathulli Njan - Sannidhanandan
- 8. Malayil Punyamalayil - Devanand
- 9. Parthasarathikku - Sriram
- 10. Neyyabhisheka Priyane- Viswanath
- 11. Vallinayakanu - Sriram
- 12. Pettathulli (instrumental)
