= Kannupada Poguthaiya =

- Poster
- Directed by: Bharathi Ganesh
- Produced by: R. B. Choudary
- Starring: Vijayakanth; Simran
- Cinematography: Victor S. Kumar
- Edited by: V. Jaishankar
- Music by: S. A. Rajkumar
- Production company: Super Good Films
- Release date: 7 November 1999
- Running time: 160 minutes
- Country: India
- Language: Tamil

Kannupada Poguthaiya (transl. People Will Get Jealous, Monsieur) is a 1999 Indian Tamil-language drama film written and directed by Bharathi Ganesh. It stars Vijayakanth in the main dual lead role as father and son. The film was released on 7 November 1999 and became a commercial success.

== Plot ==
Paramasivam, a rich landlord lives in a village along with his wife Parvathy. Vetrivel is their elder son and is widely respected by the villagers for his good deeds. Gowri is the daughter of Ramakrishnan, a school teacher in the same village. Gowri returns to village after completing education from city and at first misunderstands Vetrivel as an employee in Paramasivam's home. Later she gets to know that Vetrivel is the son of Paramasivam. Slowly Vetrivel and Gowri start liking each other. Paramasivam and Parvathy also plans to get them married.

Subramani is the younger brother of Vetrivel and he returns to the village after his completion of studies. One day, Subramani slips from a mountain nearby while taking photographs of a water fall. Gowri hears his voice and rushes to the spot along with other people and Subramani is rescued by the villagers. This makes Subramani to fall for Gowri and he expresses his intention of marrying Gowri to Vetrivel. Vetrivel is so kind towards his brother and he decides to sacrifice his love for the sake of his brother. Vetrivel also convinces Paramasivam and Parvathy to get married Subramani first although he is the younger son. Gowri is shocked knowing about the marriage plans but accepts just because of the respect she has towards Vetrivel's words. Subramani and Gowri get married.

Chinna works in Paramasivam's home and he could not tolerate Vetrivel's sacrifice. One day Chinna drinks and confesses the truth to Vetrivel's Parents. They decide to get Vetrivel married immediately to Rasathi, who is Parvathy's relative. But Rasathi's father Maniyaandar and grandfather Angaala Thevar have vengeance over Parvathy and Paramasivam and they wanted them to be killed.

Ponnambalam who also lives in the same village does not like Vetrivel and he informs Subramani that Vetrivel and Gowri are in illegitimate relationship which angers Subramani. But suddenly Gowri vomits and faints. Ramakrishnan, Father of Gowri informs everyone happily that Gowri should be pregnant. But Subramani is shocked as he has decided to have kids only after Vetrivel gets married. Now Subramani also doubts the relationship between his brother Vetrivel and Gowri. He shouts at Vetrivel and Vetrivel leaves the home after hearing painful words from his brother.

Paramasivam and Parvathy get angry seeing Subramani's activities and scold him. Also a flashback is told where Vetrivel is actually the son of Vasudevar Ayya who was a wealthy man in the village. Paramasivam worked as a driver in Parvathy's home and they marry each other. This angers Parvathy's father Angaala Thevar and her brother Maniyaandar, and they try to kill the couple. They run to Vasudevar Ayya's village for help and Vasudevar Ayya saves them. But when Angaala Thevar and Maniyaandar try to kill the couple, they kill Vasudevar Ayya. Now Vasudevar Ayya orders them to stay out of village and hands over his son Vetrivel and all the properties to Paramasivam and Parvathy.

In the meantime, doctor checks Gowri and informs that she is not pregnant. Subramani realises his mistake and apologises to Vetrivel and Gowri. Finally Vetrivel is married to Rasathi on request of Gowri and also wins the heart of her father.

== Cast ==
- Vijayakanth in a dual role as:
  - Vasu Thevar Ayya
  - Vetrivel
- Simran as Gowri
- Sivakumar as Paramasivam, Vetrivel's adoptive father & Subramani's father
- Lakshmi as Parvathy, Vetrivel's adoptive mother & Subramani's mother
- Radha Ravi as Angaala Thevar, Parvathy & Maniyaandar's father
- Anandaraj as Maniyaandar, Angaala Thevar's son and Rasathi's father
- Karan as Subramani, Vetrivel's adoptive brother, Paramasivam and Parvathy's son
- Jai Ganesh as Ramakrishnan, Gowri's father
- Charle as Chinna, an employee in Vetrivel's house
- Ponnambalam as Kaduvetti Karuppusamy
- Shakthi Kumar as Murugan, Tamilarasi's groom
- Ramesh Kumar
- Radhika Chaudhari as Rasathi
- Sathyapriya as Paarijaatham, Rasathi's mother
- K. K. Soundar
- Meesai Murugesan as Tamilarasi's father
- Vellai Subbaiah as a village veterinarian
- Crane Manohar as Kathavarayan
- Scissor Manohar as village man
- Lavanya as Tamilarasi
- Tulasi
- Theni Kunjarammal
- Suryakanth as Maniyaandar's henchman (uncredited)
- Kovai Senthil as a villager (uncredited)

== Soundtrack ==
The soundtrack was composed by S. A. Rajkumar.

Track listing
No.	Title	Lyrics	Singer(s)	Length
1.	"Mookuthi Muthazhaghu"	S. A. Rajkumar	Hariharan	5:00
2.	"Kannoramai Kadhai Pesu"	Kalai Kumar	S. P. Balasubrahmanyam, K. S. Chithra	4:22
3.	"Anandham Anandham"	Vairamuthu	Mano, Biju Narayanan, Sujatha Mohan	4:53
4.	"Elundhaal Malai Pola"	Ilaya Kamban	S. A. Rajkumar	4:41
5.	"Manasa Madichi"	Kalai Kumar	S. P. Balasubrahmanyam, K. S. Chithra	4:11
Total length:				23:07

== Release and reception ==
Kannupada Poguthaiya was released on 7 November 1999. Aurangazeb of Kalki wrote a village king, a red-painted chariot, a song on a field road, a great story of sacrifice – all these should be transported to a filmless land. S. R. Ashok Kumar of The Hindu wrote that Vijayakanth "proved his worth in a dual role" and "Director Bharathi Ganesh who also takes the credit for the story and screenplay, has done a nice film with a rural background" Dinakaran wrote, "It seems a good many scenic concepts of 'Super Good Films'' old pictures are once again reproduced in this film". Malini Mannath of Chennai Online wrote, "The story seems to be a re-hash of earlier films like Suryavamsam, Arunachalam, etc. For Vijayakant it's an easy role, for hasn't he done it a hundred times earlier? While Simran cuts a fetching picture, Karan makes full use of the opportunity given to him". Raghava Lawrence won the Tamil Nadu State Film Award for Best Choreographer.

== Post-release ==
Bharathi Ganesh later launched a project titled Velayudham starring Mammootty, Prathyusha and Eashwar, who had earlier starred in Love Channel (2001). The film was later shelved and Kannupada Poguthaiya remains the director's only release.
