= Nathikal Nanaivathillai =

2015 Indian film by Nanjil P.C. Anbazhagan

- Poster
- Directed by: Nanjil P.C. Anbazhagan
- Written by: Nanjil P.C. Anbazhagan
- Starring: Pranav; Monica; Risha
- Cinematography: Karthik Raja
- Edited by: Suresh Urs
- Music by: Soundaryan
- Production company: Saraswathi Entertainment
- Release date: 27 March 2015
- Country: India
- Language: Tamil

Nathikal Nanaivathillai (transl. Rivers don't get wet) is a 2015 Indian Tamil-language romantic drama film directed by Nanjil P.C. Anbazhagan and starring Pranav, Monica and Risha. The film was released to mixed reviews.

== Cast ==
- Pranav
- Monica
- Risha
- Kalyani Nair
- Bala Singh
- Senthil
- Gundu Kalyanam
- Madurai Muthu
- Doubt Senthil
- Nellai Siva

== Soundtrack ==
The music was composed by Soundaryan.

- "Unnai Nethu Raathri" - K. J. Yesudas

== Reception ==
Malini Mannath of The New Indian Express wrote, "Nathigal Nanaivathillai seems like yet another instance of a maker’s good intention gone haywire". A critic from Dinamalar felt that despite the poetic title, the story lacks taste. A critic from iFlicks wrote, "Director Nanjil P.C.Anbazhagan has made the movie with a mix of romance, humour and action". A critic form Kungumam wrote, "Director P.C. Anbazhagan has directed the romantic and sentimental scenes realistically and is giving advice to parents".
