= Unni Menon =

Indian singer (born 1955)

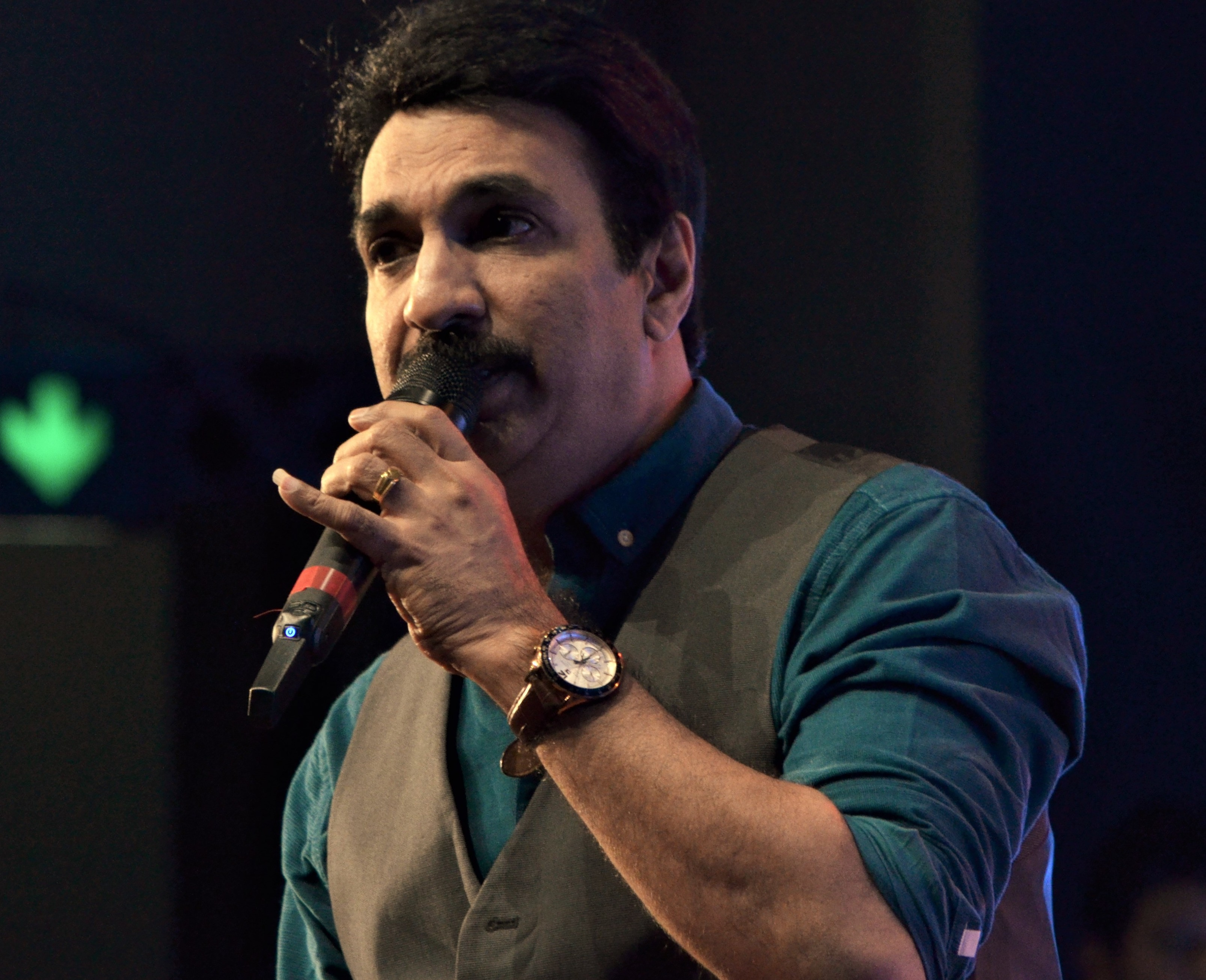

Background information
- Born: Nambalatt Narayanankutty Menon; 2 December 1955 (age 70); Guruvayur, Kerala, India
- Genres: Film score, Devotional
- Occupations: Singer, music director, actor
- Years active: Early 1980s–present
- Website: Official website

Nambalatt Narayanankutty Menon (born 2 December 1955), known better by his stage name Unni Menon is an Indian film playback singer. He has recorded over 4000 songs in many Indian languages including Malayalam, Tamil, Telugu and Kannada. In the early part of his career, he spent many years as a low-profile playback singer. The turning point in his career came with the song "Pudhu Vellai Mazhai" from Mani Ratnam's award-winning 1992 Tamil film Roja, composed by A. R. Rahman.

Menon has frequently associated with A. R. Rahman, lending his voice to nearly 27 popular songs from films like Karuththamma (1994) and Minsaara Kanavu (1997).

== Early life ==
Unni Menon was born as Narayanankutty Menon at the temple town of Guruvayur in the Thrissur district of Kerala to V.K.S. Menon and Malathy. His father was an officer in the Tamil Nadu police and a native of Guruvayur.

Menon did his schooling at Guruvayur and then at the Basel Evangelical Mission School, Palakkad. Later, he attended the Government Victoria College, Palakkad, from where he graduated in Physics. He exhibited great talent and enthusiasm for music in childhood, winning many prizes in competitions throughout his school and college days.

== Career ==
Unni Menon is a Malayalam film playback singer. Kunjunni, a violinist for music director Ilaiyaraaja introduced him to B. A. Chidambaranath, a music director, and Unni's musical career was launched in 1981–82. His maiden song "Amudhum Thenum" was never released, but with "Pon maane kobam eno" he became a noted singer in 1984.

He was a track singer and after listening to his tracks for the film, Kadathu, KJ Yesudas asked to the music director, Shyam, to make it straight. And after the huge success of the Kadathu songs ("Olangal Thaalam Thullumbol", "Punnaare Poonthinkale", etc.), Unni became a regular singer for the hit music director, Shyam. Shyam has given him a good number of popular songs like "Maanathe Hoori Pole" (Ee Naadu), "Valakilukkam Oru Valakilukkam" (Munnettam), "Kaayampoo Korthu Tharum" (Aarorumariyaathe) and "Thozhuthu Madangum Sandhyayumetho" (Aksharangal).

After Shyam's decline from the film music field, Unni's career in Malayalam film musicdom also went into shades. During that period, he has given some hit private albums such as Raagageethi and Raaga Lahari, with his contemporary playback singer, Ashalatha. Paanchajanyam, a Hindu devotional audio album on Lord Guruvayurappan, brought him a lot of fame in the Malayalam audio world.

Unni Menon moved to Chennai (then Madras) where he had a job in the Heavy Vehicles Factory at Avadi. Many of the prominent recording studios of South India were located in Chennai. His interest in music led him to visit these studios regularly and formed acquaintances with many prominent artists like the singer K. J. Yesudas and composer Ilayaraaja. Soon he had graduated from singing tracks for prominent singers and was becoming a singer sought after by many music directors.

In the 1980s he had few lone hits, "Pon maane kobam eno" in Tamil film 'Oru Kaidhiyin Diary', with a nickname Vijay, singing for Ilayaraja. His career got a major boost in 1992 when A. R. Rahman offered him the song "Puthu Vellai Mazhai".

In 2003, Unni Menon added a new dimension to his career when he acted and composed music for the Malayalam film Sthithi besides singing the songs in the film.

Unni menon is the leading Singer in 2009 Malayalam Devotional Album Saranamanthram directed by Kamalan.

== Personal life ==
Unni Menon is married to Sashila Sugathan, and the couple has two sons, Ankur and Akash.

== Filmography ==
- Sthithi (2003)

=== Television ===
Year	Name of Television Show	Role	Network
2024	Super Singer Season 10	Guest	Star Vijay
2025	Super Singer Junior season 10	Guest	Star Vijay

== Awards ==
Tamil Nadu State Film Awards:

- 2002 – Best Male Playback Singer – Varushamellam Vasantham (Song: "Enge Antha Vennila") and Unnai Ninaithu (Songs: "Ennai Thalatum" and "Yaarindha Devathai")
- 1996 – Best Male Playback Singer – Minsara Kanavu (Song: "Ooh lalala")

Film Guidance Society of Kerala Film Awards:

- 2011 – Best Male Playback Singer – Beautiful (Song: "Mazhaneer Thullikal")

North American Film Awards

- 2017 - Best Male Playback Singer – Jacobinte Swargarajyam

Kalaimamani Honour by Tamil Nadu Government

- 2018 - Contribution to Playback singing

== Discography ==
=== Malayalam songs ===
List of Malayalam songs recorded by Unni Menon

Year	Movie	Song	Music director	Lyrics	Co-artist(s)
1982	Marmaram	"Angam Prathi Anangan"	M. S. Viswanathan	Kavalam Narayana Panicker	S. Janaki
1999	Chandamama	"Rojapoo Kavilathu"	Ouseppachan	Kaithapram	Sujatha Mohan
2003	Sthithi	"Oru Chembaneer"	Unni Menon	Prabhavarma	
2012	Spirit	Maranamethunna	Shahabaz Aman	Rafeeq Ahmed	
2022	Bheeshma Parvam	"Rathipushpam"	Sushin Shyam	Vinayak Sasikumar	

=== Tamil songs ===
List of Tamil songs recorded by Unni Menon

Year	Movie	Song	Music director	Lyrics	Co-artist(s)
1985	Oru Kaidhiyin Diary	"Ponmane Kovam Yeno"	Ilaiyaraaja	Vairamuthu	Uma Ramanan
1992	Roja	"Pudhu Vellai Mazhai"	A. R. Rahman		Sujatha Mohan
1993	Captain Magal	"Vaanambadi"	Hamsalekha	Vairamuthu	Sujatha Mohan
1993	Thiruda Thiruda	”Veerapandi Kottayile”	A. R. Rahman		Mano, K. S. Chithra
1993	Gokulam	"Sevvanthi Poo"	Sirpy		P. Susheela
1993	Pudhiya Mugam	"Kannuku Mai Azhagu"	A. R. Rahman		
1993	Pudhiya Mugam	"Idhudhaan Vazhkai"	A. R. Rahman		Sujatha Mohan
1994	Chinna Madam	"Putham Puthu Oorukku"	Sirpy		
1994	Karuthamma	"Poraale Ponnuthayi"	A. R. Rahman		Sujatha Mohan
1994	Sindhu Nathi Poo	"Kadavullum Neeyum"	Soundaryan		S. Janaki
1994	Veettai Paaru Naattai Paaru	"Petha Manam"	Deva		
1995	Jameen Kottai	"Manichittu Thaalatile"	Sirpy		
1995	Villadhi Villain	"Bombai Maami"	Vidyasagar		Sujatha Mohan
1996	Kizhakku Mugam	"Iniyenna Pechu"(Male)	Adithyan		
1996	Mr. Romeo	"Mel Isaiyae"	A. R. Rahman		Swarnalatha, Srinivas, Sujatha Mohan
1996	Pudhu Nilavu	"Vanna Vanna Pookal"	Deva		
1996	Take It Easy Urvashi	"Idhayathil Iruppavale"	Soundaryan		Swarnalatha
1996	Vishwanath	"Jil Endru Veesuthu"	Deva		
1997	Minsara Kanavu	"Mana Madurai"	A. R. Rahman		K. S. Chithra, Srinivas
1997	Pudhayal	"Ochamma Ochamma"	Vidyasagar		Uma Ramanan, S. P. Balasubrahmanyam
1998	Uyire	"Poongkaatrilae"	A. R. Rahman		Swarnalatha
1999	Jodi	"Kadhal Kaditham"	A. R. Rahman		S. Janaki
1999	Kadhalar Dhinam	"Daandiyaa Aattamumaada"	A. R. Rahman		
1999	Kadhalar Dhinam	"Enna Vilaiyazhagae"	A. R. Rahman		
1999	Kudumba Sangili	"Petha Manasu"	Sirpy		Sujatha Mohan
1999	Maanaseega Kadhal	"Signal Kidaikatha"	Deva		Anuradha Sriram
1999	Ninaivirukkum Varai	"Anbe Nee Mayila"	Deva		Sujatha Mohan
1999	Pudhu Kudithanam	"Nilavukku Ennadi"	Deva		Harini
1999	Time	"Ninachapadi"	Ilaiyaraaja		
1999	Unnaruge Naan Irundhal	"Poori Poori"	Deva		Swarnalatha
2000	Aval Paavam	"Ponnanaval"	Pradeep Ravi		
2000	Chinna Chinna Kannile	"Chinna Chinna Kannile"	Sampath Selvan		
2000	Eazhaiyin Sirippil	"Karu Karu Karupayi"	Deva		Anuradha Sriram
2000	Eazhaiyin Sirippil	"Sakkaravalli"	Deva		
2000	’’Kandukondain Kandukondain’’	”Yengue Yenuthu Kavithai”	Deva	A. R. Rahman	Thamarai, K. S. Chithra
2000	"Purave En"(Version ll)	”Purave En”Version )	Sujatha Mohan		
2000	James Pandu	"James Pandu Da"	S. A. Rajkumar		Mano
2000	Mugavaree	"Yeh Nilavae"	Deva		
2000	Sathyaseelan	"Don't Miss Sagothara"	Vandemataram Srinivas		
2000	Pennin Manathai Thottu	"Kannukkulle"	S. A. Rajkumar		
2000	Rhythm	"Nadhiye Nadhiye"	A. R. Rahman		
2000	Sabhash	"Paalai Keeley"	Deva		Anuradha Sriram
2000	Seenu	"Kuchalaambaal"	Deva		Harini
2000	Unakkaga Mattum	"Ammaadi Nee Enna"	Bobby Shankar		
2000	Unakkaga Mattum	"Kaadhal Seiya"	Bobby Shankar		Srinivas
2000	Unnai Kodu Ennai Tharuven	"Pethava Kanniru"	S. A. Rajkumar		
2000	Vaanathaippola	"Mainave Mainave"	S. A. Rajkumar		K. S. Chithra
2000	Vaanavil	"Oh Penne"(Version ll)	Deva		Swarnalatha
2001	Aanandham	"Gokulathu Radhai"	S. A. Rajkumar		Sujatha Mohan, S. P. Charan
2001	Aanandham	"Kalyana Vaanil"	S. A. Rajkumar		Sujatha Mohan
2001	Alli Thandha Vaanam	"Kannalay Miya Miya"	Vidyasagar		Sri Vardhini
2001	Kadal Pookkal	"Alai Alai"	Deva		Srinivas, Swarnalatha
2001	Love Channel	"Enge Ennathu Vennila"	Deva		Sujatha Mohan
2001	Poove Pen Poove	"Kannukuley"	Subhas Jawahar		
2001	Shahjahan	"Minnalai Pidithu"	Mani Sharma		
2001	Star	"Machha Machhiniye"	A. R. Rahman		Ganga Sitharasu
2002	123	"Hey Penne"	Deva		
2002	Bala	"Poopoovai"	Yuvan Shankar Raja		Ganga Sitharasu
2002	Gummalam	"Yaaro"	Gandhidasan		
2002	Karmegham	"Etumula Veti Kati"	Vidyasagar		Antara Chowdhury
2002	Maaran	"Aanantham Aanantham"	Deva		Sujatha Mohan
2002	Maaran	"Kannukulle"	Deva		
2002	Unnai Ninaithu	"Ennai Thalattum"	Sirpy	Pa. Vijay	Sujatha Mohan
2002	Unnai Ninaithu	"Yaar Indha Devathai" II	Sirpy	Pa. Vijay	
2002	Varushamellam Vasantham	"Enge Andha Vennila"(Male)	Sirpy		
2002	Virumbugiren	"Thodu Thodu"	Deva		
2003	Bheeshmar	"Nadagam Pol Vaazhkaiyila"	S. P. Venkatesh		
2003	Chokka Thangam	"Ettu Jilla"	Deva		Anuradha Sriram
2003	Enakku 20 Unakku 18	"Sandhippoma"	A. R. Rahman		Chinmayi
2003	Priyamaana Thozhi	"Penne Neyum Pennaa"	S. A. Rajkumar		Kalpana Raghavendar
2003	Sena	"Theerathathu Kathal"	D. Imman		Nithyasree Mahadevan
2003	Thennavan	"Vatta Vatta"	Yuvan Shankar Raja		Padmalatha
2004	Autograph	"Ninaivugal Nenjil"	Bharadwaj		
2004	Kangalal Kaidhu Sei	"Ennuyir Thozhi"	A. R. Rahman	Vairamuthu	Chinmayi
2005	Amudhae	"Anbe Adu Oru Kalam"	Sunil Xavier		Sujatha Mohan
2005	Kicha Vayasu 16	"Sila Neram"	Dhina		
2005	Oru Kalluriyin Kathai	"Unakku Endru Oruthi"	Yuvan Shankar Raja	Na. Muthukumar	
2005	Thavamai Thavamirundhu	"Oru Muraidhan"	Sabesh–Murali		
2005	Veeranna	"Manithaney Kalangathey"	Soundaryan		
2006	Kasu	"Nee Oru Paarvai"(Duet)	V S Udhaya		Nirosha
2006	Kasu	"Nee Oru Paarvai"(Solo)	V S Udhaya		
2006	Vettaiyaadu Vilaiyaadu	"Partha Mudhal"	Harris Jayaraj		Bombay Jayashri
2007	Achacho	"Pengal"	M K S Narula Khan		Mahathi
2007	Rasigar Mandram	"Nilavae"	S P Boopathy		Reshmi
2007	Thirutham	"Kadhal Kanmaniye"	Pravin Mani		K. S. Chithra
2008	Ezhuthiyatharadi	"Kangalil Vanthathillai"	Sri Mahan		
2008	Kadhal Endral Enna	"Margazhi Thimuttavaa"	K Bharathi		
2008	Vedha	"Ennai Naan"	Srikanth Deva		
2009	Aarupadai	"Poove Oru Naal"	Azhvar Sri		
2009	Mariyadhai	"Yaar Parthathu"(Version ll)	Vijay Antony		
2009	Unnai Kann Theduthe	"Kagetha Puveni"	Sirpy		K. S. Chithra
2010	Thenmerku Paruvakaatru	"Kallikkaattil Pirandha"	N. R. Raghunanthan		
2011	180	"Santhikkadha Kangalil"	Sharreth		K. S. Chithra
2012	Eppadi Manasukkul Vanthai	"Muthangal"	A J Daniel		Bombay Jayashri
2012	Pathirama Pathukkunga	"Vaadukiren Paadukiren"	Sivaji Raja		
2017	Tube Light	"Mella Vaa"	Indra		Vandana Srinivasan
2022	The Legend	"Maya Maya"	Harris Jayaraj		Bombay Jayashree

=== Telugu discography ===
Year	Film	Song	Composer(s)	Co-singer(s)
1993	Donga Donga	"Veera Bobbili"	A. R. Rahman	Mano, K. S. Chithra
1994	Vanitha	"Poodota Poochindanta"	A. R. Rahman	Sujatha Mohan
1997	50 - 50	"O Meghana"	A. R. Rahman	
1997	Merupu Kalalu	"Ooh La La La"	A. R. Rahman	
1999	Premikula Roju	"Vaalu Kannuladaana"	A. R. Rahman	
1999	Premikula Roju	"Dhaandiya"	A. R. Rahman	Kavita Krishnamurthy, M. G. Sreekumar
1999	Time	"Oyyala Pandagochindhi"	Ilaiyaraaja	
2000	Maa Annayya	"Maa Logililo"	S. A. Rajkumar	
2000	Rhythm	"Dhimtanana Dhimtanana"	A. R. Rahman	
2000	Priyuallu Pilichindi	”Yemaaye Naa Kavitha	A. R. Rahman	K. S. Chithra
2003	Nee Manasu Naaku Telusu	"Kalusukundhama"	A. R. Rahman	
2004	Cheppave Chirugali	"Nannu Laalinchu"(Duet)	S. A. Rajkumar	

=== Malayalam album songs ===
- Chingakili - 1992
- Aavani Kanavukal - 1997
- Pranayamarmaram - 2009
- Ponnavanni Pattukal - 2017
- Eenathil - 2018
- Ennum Ninnormmayil (Ronima Creations) - 2022
