= Ponmaanai Thedi =

- Directed by: Paari
- Written by: Paari
- Produced by: Suba. Senthik Kumar
- Starring: Saravanan; Suvarna Mathew
- Cinematography: Visvam Nataraj
- Edited by: M. Kesavan
- Music by: Soundaryan
- Production company: Suba Seelu Films
- Release date: 6 November 1998
- Running time: 135 minutes
- Country: India
- Language: Tamil

Ponmaanai Thedi (transl. In search of the golden deer) is a 1998 Indian Tamil language film directed by Paari. The film stars Saravanan and Suvarna Mathew, with Vinu Chakravarthy, R. Sundarrajan, Delhi Ganesh, Vadivelu, Vennira Aadai Moorthy, and Sathyapriya playing supporting roles. It was released on 6 November 1998. Two years after release, the producers were given a ₹5 lakh (equivalent to ₹21 lakh or US$21,000 in 2023) subsidy by the Tamil Nadu government along with several other films.

== Plot ==
Sundaram (Saravanan) is a young wastrel while his father Ayyappan (Vinu Chakravarthy) is a rich house owner. Ayyappan can't bear Sundaram's laziness. One day, his cousin Priya (Suvarna Mathew) and her parents come from Mumbai to Sundaram's village. Priya is a well-educated and modern girl and Sundaram falls in love with her. Ayyappan decides to solemnise the marriage between Sundaram and Priya. In the meantime, Priya's parents arrange her marriage with another man. Ayyappan hides the truth to the naive Sundaram. On the wedding day, Sundaram manages to stop the wedding in time. In contrast, Priya slaps him and reveals that she was not in love with Sundaram. The groom's family cancels the wedding and Shanmugam dies of heart attack. What transpires later forms the crux of the story.

== Cast ==
- Saravanan as Sundaram
- Suvarna Mathew as Priya
- Vinu Chakravarthy as Ayyappan, Sundaram's father
- R. Sundarrajan as Chinna Paiyan
- Delhi Ganesh as Priya's father
- Vadivelu
- Vennira Aadai Moorthy
- Sathyapriya as Hamsavalli, Priya's mother
- Vichithra
- S. N. Lakshmi
- A. Sakunthala
- C. K. Saraswathi as Sundaram's grandmother
- Latha
- Kavyasri
- Sempuli Jagan
- Pandu
- King Kong as Kuruvi
- Thangavel
- Omakuchi Narasimhan
- Bhaskar
- Manikandan as Sundaram's brother
- Kovai Senthil
- Karuppu Subbaiah as Subbaiah
- Bonda Mani

== Soundtrack ==
The soundtrack was composed by Soundaryan, with lyrics written by Soundaryan, Piraisoodan and Hussein Bharathi.

Song	Singer(s)	Duration
"Idhu Kadhal Pattu"	Shahul Hameed	3:31
"Naan Paadum Pallavi"	S. Janaki	4:43
"Ponmaanai"	S. P. Balasubrahmanyam, S. Janaki, Chorus	4:56
"Solvathellam Unmai"	S. P. Balasubrahmanyam, S. Janaki	4:49
"Urumi Melam Nadaswaram"	Shahul Hameed, Malaysia Vasudevan	4:10
