= Gopura Deepam =

- Theatrical release poster
- Directed by: Ramarajan
- Written by: Ramarajan
- Produced by: Ashok Samraj
- Starring: Ramarajan; Sukanya; R. Sundarrajan; Senthil
- Cinematography: K. B. Dhayalan
- Edited by: L. Kesavan
- Music by: Soundaryan
- Production company: Kashtoori Films International
- Release date: 15 January 1997
- Country: India
- Language: Tamil

Gopura Deepam (transl. Light of the gopuram) is a 1997 Indian Tamil-language film written and directed by Ramarajan. The film stars himself, Sukanya, R. Sundarrajan and Senthil. It was released on 15 January 1997.

== Cast ==
- Ramarajan
- Sukanya
- R. Sundarrajan
- Senthil
- Pandu
- Madhan Bob
- Balu Anand
- Kovai Sarala
- R. S. Shivaji
- Halwa Vasu
- Oru Viral Krishna Rao
- Kullamani
- Theni Kunjarammal
- Karikalan
- P. R. Varalakshmi
- Thiruppur Ramasamy
- Vittal Prasath
- Samikannu
- T. S. Raghavendra
- Arjunan
- Vellai Subbaiah
- Somanathan
- Nikila
- Vijayasanthi
- Arunadevi

== Soundtrack ==
The music was composed by Soundaryan, with lyrics by Vairamuthu. The song "Ullame Unakkuthan" attained popularity.

Song	Singers	Length
"Maama Yeai"	Mano, Swarnalatha	5:01
"Ennudaiya Pondatti"	S. P. Balasubrahmanyam, Mano	4:12
"En Vaazhkkai Mannavane"	K. S. Chitra	5:16
"Ullame Unakkuthan"	S. P. Balasubrahmanyam, Anuradha Sriram	5:08
"Gangai Kaayum"	S. P. Balasubrahmanyam, Swarnalatha	4:34
"Saanja"	Mano, Swarnalatha	4:45

== Release ==
The film became a major box-office failure. Two years after release, the producers were given a ₹5 lakh subsidy by the then Tamil Nadu Chief Minister M. Karunanidhi along with ten other films.
