= Take It Easy Urvashi =

- Title card
- Directed by: K. K. Rajsirpy
- Written by: K. K. Rajsirpy
- Produced by: K. K. Rajsirpy
- Starring: Vignesh; Amirtha; Rajeshwari
- Cinematography: A. Karthik Raja
- Edited by: C. Cedrick
- Music by: Soundaryan
- Production company: Kalai Sirpy
- Release date: 5 February 1996
- Running time: 125 minutes
- Country: India
- Language: Tamil

Take It Easy Urvashi is a 1996 Indian Tamil-language romantic drama film produced and directed by K. K. Rajsirpy. The film stars Vignesh, Amirtha and Rajeshwari, with Raghuvaran, Kavitha, Jeeva, Charle, King Kong, Mayilsamy, Alex, Shanmugasundaram, Sethu Vinayagam, Kumarimuthu and Pandu playing supporting roles. It was released on 5 February 1996. The song "Urvasi Urvasi" from Kaadhalan (1994) inspired the title of the film.

== Plot ==
In Ooty, Subramani is a jobless and carefree youth who spends his time roaming with his three friends, while his widow mother Rukmani works hard to meet the needs of her family. The soft-spoken Amulu who lives in his house and Paappa who is from Palakkad are in love with Subramani but Subramani falls in love with Urvashi, a modern woman who is from a wealthy family and has studied abroad. One day, Subramani reveals his love for Urvashi but she refuses to accept it. After many quarrels with Subramani, Urvashi finally accepts Subramani's love. Thereafter, Urvashi's father Jaya who worked abroad returns to his home in Ooty. He first doesn't want his daughter to marry a wastrel but later, Urvashi convinces him and Jaya accepts. When Jaya and Rukmani meet for the marriage arrangement, they categorically refuse to marry them. Jaya is none other than Rukmani's brother and Rukmani tells Subramani about her bitter past.

In the past, Jaya lived with his sister Rukmani, his brother-in-law and Lakshmi. Jaya wanted to work overseas at any cost so he promised his family that he will help them when he will work abroad and he will then marry Lakshmi. His brother-in-law resigned from his teaching job to get the resignation money and his sister sold all her jewels. Jaya eventually went to Dubai and he swore that he will never come back to India. Afterwards, they came to know that Jaya had betrayed them so Lakshmi committed suicide, Rukmani's husband died of heart attack and Rukmani and the young Subramani found themselves on the street. Amulu's parents decided to help to them and after the death of Amulu's parents, Amulu lived with Rukmani and Subramani.

Back to the present, Amulu doesn't want to bother Subramani anymore so she becomes a religious sister. The film ends with Subramani and Urvashi getting married.

== Cast ==
- Vignesh as Subramani
- Amirtha as Urvashi
- Rajeshwari as Amulu
- Raghuvaran as Jaya
- Kavitha as Rukmani, Subramani's mother
- Jeeva as Palakkad Paappa
- Charle as Subramani's friend
- King Kong as Subramani's friend
- Mayilsamy as Subramani's friend
- Alex as Urvashi's servant
- Shanmugasundaram as Subramani's father
- Sethu Vinayagam as Church father
- Kumarimuthu as Constable
- Pandu as Sub-inspector
- Master Arunan
- Vellai Subbaiah
- Bayilvan Ranganathan as Horse owner
- Marthandan as Constable
- Vijayamurugan
- Karna
- Vasu
- Venky

== Soundtrack ==
The film score and the soundtrack were composed by Soundaryan.

All lyrics are written by Vairamuthu.

Track listing
No.	Title	Singer(s)	Length
1.	"Thoda Vendum"	Mano, Sujatha Mohan	5:14
2.	"Oh Urvasiye"	Mano, Swarnalatha	5:04
3.	"Jollu Mannargalin"	Shahul Hameed, Manojayan	5:05
4.	"Majaa Venuma"	Malgudi Subha, Annupamaa	5:02
5.	"Idhayathil Iruppavale"	Unni Menon, Swarnalatha	4:56
Total length:			25:21
