= Love Channel =

2001 film by R. N. Kumaresan

- Directed by: R. N. Kumaresan
- Written by: R. N. Kumaresan
- Produced by: R. Guru Moorthy; K. Sabari Giri
- Starring: Eashwar; Monica
- Cinematography: Rajarajan
- Edited by: K. Thanigachalam
- Music by: Deva
- Production company: Akshayaa Movies
- Release date: 22 June 2001
- Running time: 145 minutes
- Country: India
- Language: Tamil

Love Channel is a 2001 Indian Tamil language romance film directed by R. N. Kumaresan. The film stars newcomer Eashwar and Monica, with V. S. Raghavan, Rajeev, Rajesh, R. Sundarrajan, Anand and Dhamu playing supporting roles. The film, produced by R. Guru Moorthy and K. Sabari Giri, was released on 22 June 2001.

== Plot ==
The police Commissioner Arumugam (V.S. Raghavan) retires after many years of hard work. He has two sons Rajeev (Rajeev) and Ravi (Eashwar). Rajeev is married to Parimalam (Sadhana) and they have a teenage daughter. Ravi is an MBA graduate and he doesn't want to get married. Ravi's family finally find a bride for Ravi, and Rajeswari (Monica) becomes his fiancée but they have not seen each other. Later, Ravi finds a job in Germany and he left India. During the engagement ceremony, a fight breaks out between the two families and the engagement is eventually cancelled. To forget this incident, Rajeswari's grandfather brings Rajeswari to Germany. In Germany, Ravi and Rajeswari fall in love with each other. What transpires next forms the rest of the story.

== Cast ==
- Eashwar as Ravikumar (Ravi)
- Monica as Rajeswari
- V. S. Raghavan as Arumugam
- Rajeev as Rajeev
- Rajesh as Sethumadai Gounder
- R. Sundarrajan as Rajeswari's grandfather
- Anand as Anand
- Dhamu as Wilfred De Souza
- Crane Manohar as Aanazhagan
- Gemini Balaji as Annachi
- Anju Aravind as Shanthi
- Sadhana as Parimalam
- Scissor Manohar
- Kottai Perumal

== Production ==
The film was shot in France, with lead actor Eashwar, who is a non-resident Indian, facilitating the shoot. Eashwar's father had been an actor in Tamil films and he was able to discuss the script with producers Gurumurthi and director R. N. Murugesan during their visit to Paris. After the completion of the shoot, Eashwar moved to Chennai to try and pursue a career in films, but was largely unsuccessful.

== Soundtrack ==
Love Channel

Soundtrack album by Deva
- Released: 2001
- Recorded: 2001
- Genre: Feature film soundtrack
- Length: 36:55
- Producer: Deva

The film score and the soundtrack were composed by Deva. The soundtrack, released in 2001, features 6 tracks with lyrics written by Palani Bharathi, P. Vijay and Kalaikumar.

Track	Song	Singer(s)	Lyrics	Duration
1	"Desingu Raja"	Nithyasree Mahadevan	Pa. Vijay	5:55
2	"Enge Ennathu Vennila"	Unni Menon, Sujatha Mohan	Kalaikumar	6:08
3	"Odatha Odathada"	Deva, Ganga, Naveen	Palani Bharathi	6:48
4	"Cherry Cherry"	Yugendran, Anuradha Sriram	Pa. Vijay	5:36
5	"Sudithar Soodi Vantha"	Mano	Pa. Vijay	5:56
6	"Ultra Modern"	Shankar Mahadevan	Palani Bharathi	6:32

== Release and reception ==
A critic from Tamil Star wrote that "though the narrative style is very amateusrish and the screenplay has scenes that are cliched and situations that seemed to be forced into the narration". Malathi Rangarajan The Hindu wrote that "In these days of using foreign locations for song sequences alone, in Love Channel they are used as a beautiful backdrop to tell the story. But will someone tell our producers that foreigners dancing for our desi numbers present a pathetic picture?"

Following the release of the film, Eashwar signed on to produce and appear in a film directed by Bharathi Ganesh, who had earlier made Kannupada Poguthaiya (1999). Titled Velayudham, the film featured Eashwar alongside Mammootty and Pratyusha but was later stalled.
