= Uzhavan =

- Poster
- Directed by: Kathir
- Written by: Kathir
- Produced by: P. Sridhar Reddy
- Starring: Prabhu; Bhanupriya
- Cinematography: R. Raghunatha Reddy
- Edited by: K. Venkateswara Rao
- Music by: A. R. Rahman
- Production company: Sai Shanthi Films
- Release date: 13 November 1993
- Country: India
- Language: Tamil

Uzhavan (transl. Farmer) is a 1993 Indian Tamil-language drama film written and directed by Kathir. The film stars Prabhu and Bhanupriya, with Rambha in a cameo role (in her Tamil debut). A. R. Rahman composed the music. The film was released on 13 November 1993, Diwali day.

== Plot ==
The story depicts the life of a young farmer who has lived life to his fullest and made others live it too. He faces the facts: he is fat and obnoxiously so. They know him as the fat one; that many a pink girl in half-saris laugh at and would not even dream of having to live with as a wife. His mother, an old and dying woman, wishes to see her son happily wedded before she breathes her last. Finally, things seem to be falling into place, with a beautiful country girl that agrees to marriage but later, tells him of her love for another man. Heartbroken, he agrees to wreck the marriage, post which his mother falls sick and becomes worried about him. His younger brother too gets married. Later when the village president challenges him for a bullock race, he agrees and wins. At that very day, his mother dies in pain. He is ridiculed as the one that killed his own mother with his foolish acts. They cuss him and tell him that he would burn on a pyre of wet twigs. He cries to a local school teacher, who takes pity on him. She tells him of how one ought to look at the heart and not what forms outside it. It is all but physical entities, but it is the heart that beats truly. She wipes his tears and teaches him life.

== Cast ==
- Prabhu as Sundaram
- Bhanupriya
- Rambha as Eswari (Guest appearance)
- Vignesh
- Senthil
- Chinni Jayanth
- Sujatha as Subbammal, Sundaram's mother

== Production ==
Uzhavan is the first Tamil film for Rambha.

== Soundtrack ==
All music composed by A. R. Rahman. The lyrics are all written by Vaali (except "Maari Mazhai Peyyatho" written by Kathir).

No.	Title	Singer(s)	Length
1.	"Pennalla Pennalla Oothapoo"	S. P. Balasubrahmanyam	4:55
2.	"Maari Mazhai Peyyatho"	Shahul Hameed, G. V. Prakash Kumar, Sujatha Mohan	5:28
3.	"Kaathu Kaathu Dhinam Kaathu"	K. S. Chithra, G. V. Prakash Kumar	4:12
4.	"Kangalil Enna Eeramo"	K. S. Chithra, S. P. Balasubrahmanyam	4:12
5.	"Ennatha Ponnatha"	K. J. Yesudas, K. S. Chithra	5:15
6.	"Raa Kozhi Rendum"	K. J. Yesudas, Swarnalatha	5:03
Total length:			29:05
