= Muthu Kulikka Vaarieyala =

1995 film by K. S. Ravikumar

- Poster
- Directed by: K. S. Ravikumar
- Screenplay by: K. S. Ravikumar
- Story by: Chandra Kumar
- Produced by: V. Giri
- Starring: Khushbu; Vignesh; Sanghavi
- Cinematography: Ashok Rajan
- Edited by: K. Thanigachalam
- Music by: Soundaryan
- Production company: Thrimurthy Films
- Release date: 10 March 1995
- Country: India
- Language: Tamil

Muthu Kulikka Vaarieyala (transl. Do you want to go pearl hunting?) is a 1995 Indian Tamil-language romantic comedy film written and directed by K. S. Ravikumar, from a story by Chandra Kumar. The film stars Khushbu, Vignesh and Sanghavi. It was released on 10 March 1995.

== Plot ==
Chellappa, a villager, returns to his village after finishing his education, and falls in love with his neighbour Sundari. Her father, the panchayat president, threatens to shoot her if the affair becomes public knowledge. He wants Sundari to marry his relative Raja, who owns part of the land he has been taking care of while Raja is serving at the military.

== Cast ==
- Khushbu as Sivagami
- Vignesh as Chellappa
- Sanghavi as Sundari
- Goundamani as Kondaikaarar
- Vinu Chakravarthy as the panchayat president
- Senthil as Mandaikaarar
- Kannan
- Vinodhini as Kalyani
- Vichithra as Minnalkodi, a village belle
- S. N. Lakshmi
- Sathyapriya
- Ramesh Khanna
- Idichapuli Selvaraj
- K. S. Ravikumar as Raja
- Vivek (uncredited)
- Crane Manohar (uncredited)

== Production ==
Muthu Kulikka Vaarieyala was written and directed by K. S. Ravikumar, from a story by Chandra Kumar, who also wrote the dialogues. The film was produced by V. Giri under Thrimurthy Films, photographed by Ashok Rajan and edited by K. Thanigachalam. Cheran was an assistant director.

== Soundtrack ==
The soundtrack was composed by Soundaryan, and the lyrics were written by Kalidasan.

Track listing
| No. | Title | Singer(s) | Length |
|---|---|---|---|
| 1. | "Thangame" | Mano, K. S. Chithra | 4:13 |
| 2. | "Makka Onn" | Mano, Subha | 4:58 |
| 3. | "Yelaa Elavattame" | K. S. Chithra | 4:39 |
| 4. | "Chik Chik Chik" | Arunmozhi, S. Janaki | 4:01 |
| 5. | "Oh Yen Uyire" | Sujatha | 5:07 |
| Total length: | | | 22:58 |

== Release and reception ==
Muthu Kulikka Vaarieyala was released on 10 March 1995. K. Vijiyan of New Straits Times wrote, "Despite the lack of real big stars, Ravikumar manages to keep us in our seats without making us fidgety. This is a tribute to his talents". R. P. R. of Kalki wrote that Ravikumar, as director and actor, overshadowed everyone else.
