= Karuthamma =

1994 film by Bharathiraja

- Theatrical release poster
- Directed by: Bharathiraja
- Screenplay by: Bharathiraja
- Story by: M. Rathnakumar
- Starring: Raja; Rajashree; Maheswari
- Cinematography: Ilavarasu
- Edited by: K. Pazhanivel
- Music by: A. R. Rahman
- Production company: Vetrivel Creations
- Release date: 3 November 1994
- Running time: 153 minutes
- Country: India
- Language: Tamil

Karuthamma is a 1994 Indian Tamil-language drama film produced and directed by Bharathiraja from a story by M. Rathnakumar. The film stars Raja, Rajashree and Maheswari, with Saranya, Periyar Dasan, Ponvannan, Vadivukkarasi, Vaani, Vadivelu, and Janagaraj in supporting roles. It is set in a village where female infanticide is prevalent and encouraged, but the title character is against the practice. The music was scored by A. R. Rahman with cinematography by Ilavarasu and editing by K. Pazhanivel.

Karuthamma was released on 3 November 1994 and became a commercial success. It won three National Film Awards (including Best Film on Family Welfare), four Tamil Nadu State Film Awards (including Best Film Portraying Woman in Good Light) and the Filmfare Award for Best Film – Tamil. The film brought widespread attention to the practice of female infanticide and compelled the government at national and state levels to enact various laws to curb this practice.

== Plot ==
In the village of Pottalpetti, farmer Mokkaiyan and his wife Mokkatha have two daughters and a son. Two earlier newborn girls were killed shortly after birth. Unable to pay hefty dowries for their daughters' marriages, the villagers consider female infanticide acceptable. When Mokkatha delivers another daughter, Mokkaiyan orders the village midwife Mooli to kill the newborn. Mooli reluctantly tries to kill the child but is unable to go through with it. The village schoolteacher Soosai sees this, and Mooli gives the baby to him. Soosai adopts the child and leaves the village to raise her as his own.

Years later, veterinarian Stephen arrives in Pottalpetti. Mokkaiyan's first daughter Ponnatha is married to Thavasi, the son of Mokkaiyan's nefarious sister Kaliamma. Mokkaiyan's second daughter, Karuthamma, takes care of the family. After getting into a tiff with Stephen, Karuthamma falls in love with him.

Ponnatha has two daughters and is pregnant for the third time. As a girl is born again, Kaliamma orders it to be killed. To save her child, Ponnatha escapes with it. However, Thavasi chases her, beats her to death, and the child also dies. Thavasi and Kaliamma lie that Ponnatha committed suicide as her third child was also a girl. Karuthamma, devastated by her sister's death, does not believe this story. When Karuthamma is giving a ceremonial bath to Ponnatha's body, she notices bloodstains on Ponnatha's abdomen. Concluding that she was murdered, Karuthamma stops the funeral and rushes to tell the police. The village chairman Chellamuthu, who is close to Thavasi, asks the police not to intervene, and they comply. Stephen, who was passing by, threatens action against the police if they do not act on her complaint, as he is also a government employee. The police takes Ponnatha's body away and arrests Thavasi and Kaliamma.

Meanwhile, Rosy, a doctor and Stephen's relative, visits the village. Karuthamma misunderstands Rosy's presence and closeness with Stephen. Rosy loves Stephen, but he only likes her. Meanwhile, Kaliamma's husband celebrates her arrest by drinking with Mokkaiyan, who is not used to liquor. Mokkaiyan suffers a paralytic attack and loses control of his limbs. Rosy tends to him, and in the process, becomes attached to him and Karuthamma.

A few weeks later, when Thavasi and Kaliamma get bail, they come to attack Karuthamma, but Stephen saves her. Chellamuthu manipulates the villagers into accepting Thavasi's proposal that Karuthamma must marry Thavasi to take care of Ponnatha's daughters and settle the police case. Chellamuthu, who has lent money to Mokkaiyan, threatens him and demands immediate repayment if Mokkaiyan refuses this proposal. Thavasi's father realises that his son is using the children as bait and takes the children with him one night. However, Thavasi catches his father and burns him to death. He then takes the children away and forces Karuthamma to accompany him for the planned marriage. Shocked by everything, Mokkaiyan consumes poison and is on his deathbed.

When Rosy expresses her love to Stephen, he is surprised and says he loves Karuthamma. Rosy is shocked as she was keen to marry him and decides to leave the village. When the villagers ask her to treat Mokkaiyan, who is fighting for his life, she does not. When her father Soosai arrives, Mooli realises he is the same person who took Mokkaiyan's third daughter. Mooli reveals to Rosy that Mokkaiyan is her real father, and Soosai confirms it. Rosy treats Mokkaiyan, who now realises his mistake of killing female infants without realising their worth.

On the eve of her wedding, Karuthamma demands to see the children taken away earlier by Thavasi's father. However, Thavasi is unable to show his children as Chellamuthu took them as bait to force himself on Karuthamma. That night, Chellamuthu makes Thavasi drunk and asks him to spare Karuthamma. Thavasi agrees in a drunken state, which is overheard by Karuthamma, who also learns that Thavasi had killed his own father. When Chellamuthu goes to meet Karuthamma, she murders him and then Thavasi. After saving Ponnatha's children, she returns to her village. Realising that Rosy is her own sister, Karuthamma asks her to look after the children and their father and leaves with the police. Stephen decides to wait for her.

== Cast ==
- Raja as Stephen
- Rajashree as Karuthamma
- Maheswari as Rosy
- Saranya as Ponnatha
- Periyar Dasan as Mokkaiyan
- Kamala Sekhar as Chellamuthu
- Janagaraj as Kaliamma's husband
- Vadivelu as Sevalaikaalai
- Ponvannan as Thavasi
- Vadivukkarasi as Kaliamma
- S. N. Lakshmi as Mooli
- Vaani as Mokkatha
- Theni K. Murugan as Sudalai

Uncredited

- R. Sundarrajan as Soosai
- Theni Kunjarammal as a villager

== Production ==
The film was titled after Bharathiraja's mother. Periyar Dasan, who worked as a professor in Pachaiyappa's College, made his acting debut with this film, as did Rajashree and Maheswari; Rajashree's voice was dubbed by Radikaa. Kamala Sekhar, the film's art director, also portrayed the village chairman Chellamuthu. Initially, Bharathiraja wanted to cast Vijayakumar's second daughter Anita as Rosy but Vijayakumar and her mother Manjula refused because Anita wanted to study medicine; the role went to Maheswari. Ponvannan reunited with Bharathiraja after Pudhu Nellu Pudhu Naathu (1991). For a scene in which his character attacks Janagaraj's character with a chair, the makers brought an antique chair which "broke into pieces" after Ponvannan swung it during filming. Although B. Kannan shot the film, his assistant Ilavarasu was credited as the cinematographer.

== Music ==
The soundtrack was composed by A. R. Rahman, with lyrics by Vairamuthu. The film marked Rahman's second collaboration with Bharathiraja after Kizhakku Cheemayile (1993). As with that film, the songs in Karuthamma gained Rahman notice for composing folk music, contrary to his reputation for composing westernised music. The song "Poraale Ponnuthayi" is based on Mohanam raga. The music of "Poraale Ponnuthayi" was reused for "Gurus of Peace" in the album Vande Mataram.

All lyrics are written by Vairamuthu; all music is composed by A. R. Rahman.

No.	Title	Singer(s)	Length
1.	"Thenmerku Paruva Kaatru"	P. Unnikrishnan, K. S. Chithra	05:02
2.	"Poraale Ponnuthayi" (Sad)	Swarnalatha	06:22
3.	"Poraale Ponnuthayi"	Unni Menon, Sujatha Mohan	05:42
4.	"Pacha Kili Paadum"	Shahul Hameed, Minmini	04:41
5.	"Kaadu Potta Kaadu"	Bharathiraja, Malaysia Vasudevan	05:33
6.	"Araro Ariraro"	T. K. Kala, Theni Kunjarammal, Deepan Chakravarthy	01:47
7.	"Yaar Petha Pillai"	Jayachandran	02:03

== Release ==
Karuthamma was released on 3 November 1994. The film received critical acclaim and became a commercial success, running for over 100 days in theatres.

=== Critical reception ===
Ananda Vikatan mentioned in its review dated 4 December 1994, "Though the subject taken up was delicate, instead of making a documentary, the director has narrated the film, through visuals, which should be appreciated. Bharathiraja must be congratulated for making a heart-wrenching film on a delicate subject without lecturing us on the theme". The film was given 45 marks. Malini Mannath of The Indian Express wrote, "Karuthamma is a film that will move many a human heart." K. Vijiyan of New Straits Times wrote, "Bharathiraja returns to do what he is best at — telling stories about ordinary village people [...] And in Karuthamma he has a winner". He also praised the film's humour, a rare feature in Bharathiraja's films. Prince of Kalki lauded Bharathiraja for daring to depict such an atrocious social problem onscreen.

=== Accolades ===
Event	Award	Recipient	Ref.
1994 National Film Awards	Best Female Playback Singer	Swarnalatha (for "Poraale Ponnuthaayi")	
1994 National Film Awards	Best Lyricist	Vairamuthu (for "Poraale Ponnuthaayi...")	
1994 National Film Awards	Best Film on Family Welfare	Bharathiraja	
1994 Tamil Nadu State Film Awards	Best Female Playback Singer	Swarnalatha (for "Poraale Ponnuthaayi...")	
1994 Tamil Nadu State Film Awards	Best Lyricist	Vairamuthu (for "Poraale Ponnuthaayi...")	
1994 Tamil Nadu State Film Awards	Best Actress	Rajashree	
1994 Tamil Nadu State Film Awards	Tamil Nadu State Film Award for Best Film Portraying Woman in Good Light	Bharathiraja	
42nd Filmfare Awards South	Best Film – Tamil	Bharathiraja	

== Legacy ==
=== Societal impact ===
The first film to bring to light the menace of female infanticide on screen, Karuthamma forced the government at national and state levels to act against this practice and bring in suitable laws to curb it. It became a catalyst for this change in the society, and was instrumental in "making way for the ban on prenatal sexual identification".

=== In other films ===
The theme of Karuthamma found place in other Tamil films, especially in the form of comic scenes or comedy films. In Kadhal Sadugudu (2003), a character played by Theni Kunjarammal tries to kill a female child with poisoned milk. Super Subbu (Vivek), who sees this, comically remarks that he has been seeing this from the days of Karuthamma. Scenes from Karuthamma have also been parodied in Tamizh Padam (2010), in which the theme of female infanticide has been replaced with that of male infanticide. Periyar Dasan reprises his role from the original film.

== Bibliography ==
- Dhananjayan, G. (2014). Pride of Tamil Cinema: 1931–2013. Blue Ocean Publishers. OCLC 898765509.
- Rajadhyaksha, Ashish; Willemen, Paul (1998) [1994]. Encyclopaedia of Indian Cinema. British Film Institute and Oxford University Press. ISBN 0-19-563579-5.
