= Theni Kunjarammal =

Indian actress and playback singer

- Born: Kunjarammal c. 1934; Theni, Tamil Nadu, India
- Died: 18 April 2008
- Occupations: Actress, singer
- Years active: 1993–2008

Theni Kunjarammal (தேனி குஞ்சரம்மாள்) (1934 - 18 April 2008) was an Indian actress and playback singer who worked in the Tamil film industry. As a playback singer, she worked extensively with A. R. Rahman during the late 1990s and early 2000s on folk songs.

== Career ==
As an actress, Kunjarammal was best known for playing elderly women in rural settings, and made a breakthrough with her performance in Karuththamma (1994) as a woman who feeds insecticide to baby girls. She later reprised the role in Vivek's comedy track in Kadhal Sadugudu (2003).

Theni Kunjarammal also worked as a singer in films and regularly collaborated with A. R. Rahman on folk songs. The duo first worked together on "Pettai Rap" from Kaadhalan (1994), and later collaborated on albums including Muthu (1995), Taj Mahal (1999), and Sillunu Oru Kaadhal (2006). She also worked with other composers including Ilaiyaraaja in Virumaandi (2004) and Harris Jayaraj in Arul (2004).

== Personal life ==
In June 2006, Kunjarammal joined the political party, All India Anna Dravida Munnetra Kazhagam (AIADMK) in the presence of its general secretary Jayalalithaa. Upon her acceptance into the party, Kunjarammal performed a song for Jayalalithaa on stage.

== Notable filmography ==
Uncredited roles

- Karuththamma (1994)
- Poovellam Kettuppar (1999)
- 12B (2001)
- Five Star (2002)
- Kai Vandha Kalai (2006)

Credited roles

- Vedham Pudhithu (1987)
- Pudhea Paadhai (1989)
- Ninaivu Chinnam (1989)
- Maruthu Pandi (1990)
- Archana IAS (1991)
- Amma Ponnu (1993)
- Thaai Manasu (1994)
- Naan Petha Magane (1995)
- Mannukku Mariyadhai (1995)
- Bharathi Kannamma (1997)
- Gopura Deepam (1997)
- Rathna (1998)
- Kizhakkum Merkkum (1998)
- Thullatha Manamum Thullum (1999)
- Unakkaga Ellam Unakkaga (1999)
- Taj Mahal (1999)
- Kushi (2000)
- Budget Padmanabhan (2000)
- Dhaya (2002)
- Kaadhal Sugamanathu (2003)
- Kadhal Sadugudu (2003)
- Whistle (2003)
- Jore (2004)
- Virumaandi (2004)
- Jananam (2004)
- Devathaiyai Kanden (2005)
- Thirupaachi (2005)
- Sivakasi (2005)
- Paramasivan (2006)
- Theekuchi (2008)
- Dhaam Dhoom (2008)

=== Television ===
- 2004-2005 Krishna Cottage (Jaya TV)
- Maya Machantra (STAR Vijay)

== Notable discography ==
| Year | Song title | Film | Music director | Co-singer | Notes |
|---|---|---|---|---|---|
| 1994 | "Pettai Rap" | Kaadhalan | A. R. Rahman | Suresh Peters & Shahul Hameed | |
| 1994 | "Peta Rap" | Kaadhalan (D) - Telugu | A. R. Rahman | Suresh Peters & Shahul Hameed | |
| 1994 | "Araro Ariraro" | Karuththamma | A. R. Rahman | T. K. Kala & Deepan Chakravarthy | |
| 1995 | "Kokku Saiva Kokku" | Muthu | A. R. Rahman | S. P. Balasubrahmanyam, Febi Mani, Ganga Sitharasu & A. R. Rahman | |
| 1999 | "Adi Manjakelange" | Taj Mahal | A. R. Rahman | Ganga Sitharasu, Febi Mani & Kanchana | |
| 1999 | "Kizhakke Nandavanam" | Taj Mahal | A. R. Rahman | Ganga Sitharasu, Febi Mani & Kanchana | |
| 2004 | "Maada Vilakkae" | Virumaandi | Ilaiyaraaja | Kamal Haasan | |
| 2004 | "Magarasiyae Manna Vitu Poniyae" | Virumaandi | Ilaiyaraaja | | |
| 2004 | "Ukkadathu" | Arul | Harris Jayaraj | Tippu & L. R. Easwari | |
| 2006 | "Kummi Adi" | Sillunu Oru Kaadhal | A. R. Rahman | Sirkazhi G. Sivachidambaram, Swarnalatha, Naresh Iyer & Vignesh | |
