= Soundaryan =

Indian music composer

- Born: Chennai, Tamil Nadu, India
- Genre: Film Score
- Occupations: Film music composer, music director
- Years active: 1991-present

Soundaryan is an Indian music composer, who works in Tamil films. A former ad-jingles composer, he made his debut in the film Cheran Pandiyan (1991) and then made a breakthrough with his work in Sindhu Nathi Poo (1994).

== Career ==
Soundaryan began his career by working with K. S. Ravikumar on two successful films, Cheran Pandiyan (1991) and Putham Pudhu Payanam (1991). He subsequently composed songs for films with rural backdrops in the 1990s, winning acclaim for his work in Sindhu Nathi Poo (1994), Gopura Deepam (1997) and Cheran Chozhan Pandian (1998), before working on low budget films thereafter.

Throughout the 2000s and 2010s, he has continued to work as a music composer, and recently worked on Nadhigal Nanaivadhillai (2014) and Nanaiyadha Mazhaiye (2016).

== Discography ==
=== As composer ===
- Cheran Pandiyan (1991)
- Putham Pudhu Payanam (1991)
- Mudhal Seethanam (1992)
- Sindhu Nathi Poo (1994)
- Muthukulikka Vaariyala (1995)
- Maa Manithan (1995)
- Andha Naal (1996)
- Take It Easy Urvashi (1996)
- Gopura Deepam (1997)000
- Conductor Mappillai (1997)
- Ponmaanai Thedi (1998)
- Cheran Chozhan Pandian (1998)
- Seerivarum Kaalai (2001)
- Nearupoo (2001)
- Anbu Thollai (2003)
- Galatta Ganapathy (2003)
- Kadhale Jayam (2004)
- Mudhal Aasai (2005)
- Veeranna (2005)
- Malarinum Melliya (2008)
- Nathikal Nanaivathillai (2014)
- Nanaiyadha Mazhaiye (2016)
- Ennam Puthu Vannam (2016)
- Puthiya Bruce Lee (2018)
- Pasakara Paya (2022)
- Annamalaiyin Porulu (2023)

=== As lyricist ===
- Putham Puthu Payanam - all songs
- Cheran Pandian - all songs
