= Shahul Hameed =

- Born: Shahul Hameed; 24 December 1953
- Died: 3 March 1997 (aged 43) Chennai, Tamil Nadu, India
- Occupation: Playback singer
- Years active: 1980-1997

Shahul Hameed (24 December 1953 – 3 March 1997) was an Indian playback singer who sang predominantly in Tamil cinema under the music direction of the Academy Award winner A. R. Rahman. His association with the composer dated back to the TV jingles in the 1980s. He is most known for the songs Rasaathi En Usuru from Thiruda Thiruda (1993), Senthamizh Naatu Thamizhachiye from Vandicholai Chinraasu (1994), Urvasi Urvasi from Kaadhalan (1994), and Vaarayo Thozhi from Jeans (1998).

== Early life and career ==
Shahul Hameed used to be a regular TV show singer in the 1980s. He has sung more than 30 songs in Isaithendral and other shows. He was highly noticed on the television in the year 1982. During this time, he met A. R. Rahman who was also popular in composing TV jingles. Their first association was for the album Deen Isai Maalai, an Islamic Devotional album in 1989. There were some songs from this combination in the early 1990s and they became close friends. As of 2024, AR Rahman is exploring the use of AI AI to recreate Shahul's voice in the latest track for Lal Salaam.

== Death ==
Shahul Hameed died in a car crash on 3 March 1997, near ulundurpet.

== Discography ==
=== Tamil ===
==== Non-film songs ====
Year	Song title	Film/ Album name	Co-singer(s)
1989	"Ellam Pughazhum Iraivanukke"	Deen Isai Maalai	
1989	"Yengal Abdul"	Deen Isai Maalai	
1989	"Nagoore Shahul Hameed"	Deen Isai Maalai	
1989	"Nagoore Naharalum Tooya"	Deen Isai Maalai	

==== Film songs ====
Year	Song title	Film/ Album Name	Co-singer(s)
1993	"Usilampatti Penkutti"	Gentleman	Swarnalatha
1993	"Maari Mazhai Peyyadho"	Uzhavan	G. V. Prakash Kumar Sujatha Mohan
1993	"Rasaathi EnUsuru"	Thiruda Thiruda	
1994	"Senthamizhnattu Tamizhachhiye"	Vandicholai Chinraasu	
1994	"Eechampazham"	Pavithra	K. S. Chithra
1994	"Aathadi Enna Odambu"	Sindhu Nathi Poo	
1994	'Kuppeyile Nel'	Sindhu Nathi Poo	
1994	"Madrasai Suthi"	May Madham	Swarnalatha, G. V. Prakash and Manorama
1994	"Edhukku Pondaati"	Kizhakku Cheemayile	T. K. Kala, Sunandha
1994	"Pachhai Kili Padum"	Karuthamma	Minmini
1994	"Urvasi Urvasi"	Kaadhalan	A. R. Rahman, Suresh Peters
1994	"Pettai Rap"	Kaadhalan	Suresh Peters, Theni Kunjarammal
1995	"Vadugapatti Vayasu Kutti"	Maaman Magal	Sangeetha Sajith
1995	"Rajini Varar Bavani"	Thotta Chinungi	SP Sailaja, Sujatha
1996	"Muthu Muthu"	Kizhakku Mugam	Sujatha Mohan
1996	" Bombai Party "	Coimbatore Mappillai	Vijay (actor)
1996	" Maruthayee Ninaichu "	Aruva Velu	Swarnalatha
1996	"Thenkasi Mamanukku"	Gopala Gopala	Swarnalatha
1997	"Aval Varuvala"	Nerrukku Ner	Hariharan
1997	"Bagalu Bagalu"	Vaimaye Vellum	Malgudi Subha
1998	"Vaarayo Thozhi"	Jeans	Sonu Nigam, Harini, Sangeetha
1998	"Idhu Kadhal Pattu"	Ponmaanai Thedi	Malgudi Subha
1998	"Urumi Melam Nadaswaram"	Ponmaanai Thedi	Malaysia Vasudevan
1998	"Kadalicha Ponnu"	Cheran Chozhan Pandian	S. N. Surendar, Arunmozhi
2024	"Thimiri Yezhuda"	Lal Salaam	Bamba Bakya, Deepthi Suresh, Akshaya Shivkumar

=== Telugu ===
Year	Song title	Film/ Album Name	Co-singer(s)
1993	"Muddenapalli"	Gentleman (D)	Swarnalatha
1993	"Sithalu"	Donga Donga (D)	
1994	"Urvasi"	Kaadhalan (D)	A. R. Rahman, Suresh Peters
1994	"Peta Rap"	Kaadhalan (D)	Suresh Peters, Theni Kunjaramma
