= Aruva Velu =

1996 Tamil-language film by Bharathi Kannan

- Directed by: P. S. Bharathi Kannan
- Screenplay by: P. S. Bharathi Kannan
- Story by: K. V. Gunasekaran
- Produced by: K. V. Gunasekaran
- Starring: Nassar; Urvashi
- Cinematography: A. Sabapathy
- Edited by: V. Rajagopal; S. Govindasamy
- Music by: Adithyan
- Production company: Goodwill Movies
- Release date: 15 January 1996
- Running time: 140 minutes
- Country: India
- Language: Tamil

Aruva Velu (transl. Bilhook Velu) is a 1996 Indian Tamil language action drama film directed by P. S. Bharathi Kannan in his debut. The film stars Nassar and Urvashi. It was released on 15 January 1996.

== Plot ==
The film begins with Velu (Nassar) being sentenced to the death penalty.

In the past, Velu was an angry man who solved villagers problems by violence. Whereas Muthurasa (Rajesh), Velu's uncle, was a respected village chief who solved villagers problems peacefully. Maruthayi (Urvashi), Muthurasa's daughter, loved her cousin Velu. Alavanthar (Anandaraj), a stone-hearted rich landlord, exploits the villagers and with his twin sons (Ram-Lakshman) spread terror among the villagers. Muthurasa helped the villagers by giving them some lands. Alavanthar, angry, managed to kill some villagers and Muthurasa informed the police. Alavanthar was therefore arrested, he was immediately released and killed Muthurasa. To take revenge, Velu killed one of Alavanthar's sons and he was arrested. Thereafter, Velu managed to escape from jail and killed the other son of Alavanthar. Alavanthar killed a police officer and blamed Velu for the murder. Velu was once again sent to jail and Maruthayi committed suicide. At her funeral, Velu, who was escorted by the police, escaped and he eventually killed Alavanthar.

Velu is then hanged in jail for his crimes.

== Cast ==
- Nassar as Velu
- Urvashi as Maruthayi
- Anandaraj as Alavanthar
- Rajesh as Muthurasa
- Ram as Alavanthar's son
- Lakshman as Alavanthar's son
- S. N. Lakshmi as Velu's grandmother
- Nellai Siva as Police officer
- Singamuthu as Gurukkal
- Bonda Mani
- Jyothi Meena as Ponni
- A. K. Veerasamy as Ponni's father
- Krishnamoorthy
- Sethu Vinayagam as Jailer
- LIC Narasimhan
- Karuppu Subbiah
- Vellai Subbaiah

== Production ==
Aruva Velu is the directorial debut of Bharathi Kannan, previously a public relations officer.

== Soundtrack ==
The soundtrack was composed by Adithyan.

Song	Singer(s)	Lyrics	Duration
"Kaadu Mazha Sollum"	Adithyan	Madhurakasi	4:48
"Maruthayee Ninaichu"	Swarnalatha, Shahul Hameed	Vairamuthu	4:47
"Rohttu Pakkam"	S. P. Sailaja	Vairamuthu	5:12
"Vanthachu Nalla Kalam"	Mano, Malgudi Subha, Adithyan	Vairamuthu	5:22
"Yeamma Indha Rathiri"	Sujatha	Panchu Arunachalam	4:57

== Reception ==
D. S. Ramanujam of The Hindu wrote, "To depict a theme cogently with interesting situations, that too without a comedy track, is no easy task for a debutant director", but Bharathi Kannan "does it without much fuss" and Nassar, playing the title character, "comes out with flying colours".
