= Kizhakku Mugam =

- Theatrical release poster
- Directed by: M. Anna Thurai
- Written by: M. Anna Thurai
- Produced by: P. Govindaraj; M. Thangavel
- Starring: Karthik; Reshma
- Cinematography: Shantha Moorthy
- Edited by: K. P. K. Raviy
- Music by: Adithyan
- Production company: Thai Films International
- Release date: 15 January 1996
- Running time: 135 minutes
- Country: India
- Language: Tamil

Kizhakku Mugam (transl. East Face) is a 1996 Indian Tamil-language film written and directed by M. Anna Thurai, starring Karthik and newcomer Reshma. It was released on 15 January 1996, and failed at the box office.

== Plot ==
Venu and his friend Mukka work at the graveyard. Venu has a mother and a sister called Sindhamani, a studious student. Poongodi, daughter of the village president, eve-teases Sindhamani. Venu orders to Poongodi to stop it immediately and Poongodi decides to revenge Venu. They have some quarrels. Nagaraj, Poongodi's uncle and a smuggler, wants to marry his niece Poongodi. After Poongodi's puberty ceremony, she changes her behaviour and shows sympathy for Venu.

The village president doesn't seem to care about caste or money, so he united many lovers. One day, Nagaraj steals the god status at the temple but Venu beats up the henchmen and he brings back the status. The village's Brahmins criticised his action and to prove the opposite, he recites Sanskrit very well. The village priest proposes to marry his daughter but Venu declares that Poongodi and he are in love. Poongodi's father supplies Poongodi to forget him and Poongodi's father arranges to find a groom but Kannapan, a bad turns good after Venu's advises, helps Venu by menacing the grooms. All the village supports Venu and they don't understand Poongodi's father hypocritical decision.

The village priest asks the Venu's past and his mother discloses that he is not her real son. Venu was the son of a widow Brahmin and he was a gifted boy appreciated by the village priest. Venu's real mother worked in her relative's house and her chief decided to rape her, the chief's wife surprised them and humiliated Venu's real mother in front of the villagers. Venu's real mother and the chief committed suicide. Venu leaves his village with his mother dead-body and he was adopted by a poor family. Poongodi's father accepts his caste, he requests him to separate from his poor family, Venu refuses here and now.

Later, Nagaraj kidnaps Sindhamani and tries to rape her, though to save her virginity, she commits suicide. Venu fights against Nagaraj's henchmen and kills Nagaraj. Feeling guilty of Sindhamani's death, Poongodi's father accepts Venu to marry his daughter.

== Cast ==
- Karthik as Venu ('Vettiyan' Venugopal)
- Reshma as Poongodi
- Radha Ravi as the village president and Poongodi's father
- Anandaraj as Nagaraj
- Charle as Mukka
- Delhi Ganesh
- Alex as Kannapan
- Vadivukkarasi as Venu's mother
- T. S. Raghavendra as the chief
- Sathyapriya as Poongodi's mother
- Kumarimuthu as a villager
- Shanthi Williams

== Soundtrack ==
The soundtrack was composed by Adithyan, with lyrics written by Vairamuthu.

Song	Singer(s)	Duration
"Chinthamani"	K. S. Chithra	3:41
"Muthu Muthu"	Shahul Hameed, Sujatha	4:18
"Kadhal Enbadhu"	Adithyan	4:39
"Aathukullea"	P. Unni Krishnan, Sangeetha Sajith	4:59
"Kannum Kannum"	K. S. Chithra, Adithyan	5:32
"Naangu Vedham"	S. P. Balasubrahmanyam	2:20
"Iniyenna Pechu" (female)	Vasavi	4:01
"Iniyenna Pechu" (male)	Unni Menon	3:33

== Release and reception ==
The film was released simultaneously alongside Karthik's other film Ullathai Allitha on 15 January 1996 and failed at the box-office. D. S. Ramanujam of The Hindu wrote "Kizhakku Mugam, a ticklish theme handled on its merit by director M. Annadurai. Karthik who has opened the year with a good note in [Ullathai Allitha], maintains the vein".
