= Sindhu Nathi Poo =

- Theatrical release poster
- Directed by: Senthamizhan
- Written by: Senthamizhan
- Produced by: K. T. Kunjumon
- Starring: Ranjith; Rajakumari; Ravi Shankar; Sanjeev Kumar
- Cinematography: A. Karthik Raja
- Edited by: R. T. Annadurai
- Music by: Soundaryan
- Production company: A. R. S. Film International
- Release date: 14 January 1994
- Running time: 135 minutes
- Country: India
- Language: Tamil

Sindhu Nathi Poo (transl. The flower of the Indus River) is a 1994 Indian Tamil-language film directed by Senthamizhan in his debut. It stars Ranjith, newcomers Rajakumari, Ravi Shankar and Sanjeev Kumar. The film, produced by K. T. Kunjumon, was released on 14 January 1994.

== Plot ==
Sakthivel, a young man, returns to his village. Upon his return, he is respected and treated as God by the villagers, who call him Thirukkaval. Thirukkaval hates his father Chettiar, stepmother Azhamu, stepbrother and stepsister. The kind-hearted Thirukkaval quickly makes enemies including Munnumunuthan, Kodumudi and his father Chettiar. Meanwhile, Pasupathy (Ravi Shankar) and Chinna Pulla (Rajakumari) fall in love with each other. The affair is soon exposed, so Thirukkaval arranges their wedding. Shortly after, Pasupathy dies in an accident and the villagers blame the innocent Thirukkaval.

In the past, Thirukkaval lived happily with his father Chettiar, his mother Shenbaga Valli and his baby sister Chittu. Chettiar had an affair with Shenbaga Valli's sister Azhamu, who became pregnant. Unable to bear the situation, Shenbaga Valli killed her baby daughter and committed suicide. The angry Thirukkaval injured his father's foot and ran away. He then became a child labourer to make a living.

Meanwhile, Chinna Pulla's mother Appayi passes away. Thereafter, Thirukkaval is accused of having an affair with the widow Chinna Pulla. What transpires next forms the rest of the story.

== Cast ==
- Ranjith as Thirukkaval (Sakthivel)
- Rajakumari as Chinna Pulla
- Ravi Shankar as Pasupathy
- Sanjeev Kumar
- Jaishankar as Chettiar
- Manorama as Appayi
- Kavitha as Azhamu
- Kalpana as Shenbaga Valli (guest appearance)
- Vadivelu as Nadesan
- Vasu Vikram as Munnumunuthan
- Kazan Khan as Kodumudi
- Idichapuli Selvaraj as Kuberan
- Dhamu as Soori
- C. K. Saraswathi
- Pandu
- Loose Mohan
- Swamikannu
- Pasi Narayanan
- Karuppu Subbiah
- Rajathi
- Yuvasri
- Kavithasri
- Pasi Sathya
- Peeli Sivam
- Amar
- Baby Swathi as Chittu

== Production ==
Sindhu Nathi Poo is the directorial debut of Senthamizhan.

== Soundtrack ==
The soundtrack was composed by Soundaryan, with lyrics by Vairamuthu. The song "Aathadi Enna Odambu" attained popularity in 2018 due to a comical sequence performed by comedian KPY Ramar in a Tamil television show which became a hit on social media platforms. This re-emergence of popularity for the song led to it being remixed by Hiphop Tamizha for the film Natpe Thunai (2019).

Song	Singer(s)	Duration
"Kuppeyile Nel"	Shahul Hameed	1:40
"Aalamaram"	Sujatha Mohan, Chorus	2:43
"Mathalam Kottudhadi"	S. P. Balasubrahmanyam, Swarnalatha, Loose Mohan	4:54
"Aathadi Enna Odambu"	Shahul Hameed, Sujatha Mohan	4:31
"Kadavullum Neeyam"	Unni Menon, S. Janaki	5:11
"Aathi Vadayile"	K. J. Yesudas, Asha Latha	5:05
"Adiye Adi Chinnapulla"	Mano, S. Janaki	4:51

== Release and reception ==
Sindhu Nathi Poo was released on 14 January 1994. Malini Mannath of The Indian Express gave the film a negative review, criticising the "jerky" narration, underdeveloped characters and the cast performances. Thulasi of Kalki criticised the story for lack of originality.
