= Nyaya Tharasu =

- Poster
- Directed by: K. Rajeshwar
- Screenplay by: M. Karunanidhi
- Story by: M. T. Vasudevan Nair
- Produced by: M. Veda
- Starring: Nizhalgal Ravi; Radha
- Cinematography: G. P. Krishna
- Edited by: P. Venkateswara Rao
- Music by: Shankar–Ganesh
- Production company: Menaka Pictures
- Distributed by: Arulnidhi Creations
- Release date: 11 August 1989
- Running time: 150 minutes
- Country: India
- Language: Tamil

Nyaya Tharasu (transl. Scales of Justice) is a 1989 Indian Tamil-language film, directed by K. Rajeshwar, making his directorial debut, starring Nizhalgal Ravi and Radha. It is a remake of Malayalam film Panchagni. The film revolves around a woman who puts her commitment to social activism above everything else, including her love for an adoring man.

== Plot ==
The movie revolves around the incidents in a two-week period, when Bharathi, a Naxal activist, is out on parole. She is serving life sentence in the central jail, Kannore, after being charged for the murder of Paramanandham, a landlord, who she had seen kill a young tribal woman after she was raped and impregnated by him.

Bharathi's mother, a past freedom fighter who is on her deathbed, is relieved to see her, and is under the impression that she is free now. Her younger sister Savithri, her husband Vijayasarathi and her nephew are also happy to have Bharathi back home. But her younger brother, Bose, who is unemployed and drug-addicted, is angered by her presence, blaming her for his inability to secure a good job. Bharathi's older brother who is home from Delhi to perform the death rites of their mother refuses to even talk to her, and leaves after a big brouhaha, leaving his nephew to do the rites. Most of her acquaintances are intimidated by her, except her old classmate Amutha. Amutha had married her college sweetheart, Nagappan, and lives close to Bharathi's home.

Thazhamuthu, a Nyaya Tharasu journalist, tries to get an interview with Bharathi. She declines initially and is annoyed by his persistence.

As the days pass, Bharathi feels unwanted, and ends up having no place to live. Savithri suspects an affair between her husband and Bharathi, making it hard for Bharathi to stay with them. Amutha's husband has changed a lot, having become a womanizer while Bharathi was imprisoned, and Bharathi can't stay with them either. Ultimately Bharathi asks Thazhamuthu for help and ends up staying at his place.

With time, Bharathi and Thazhamuthu get closer, and a lovely relationship blossoms between the two. As Bharathi is nearing the completion of her parole, Thazhamuthu, with great difficulty, succeeds in getting the government remission order in time, so that Bharathi no longer has to go back to jail. By this time, Savithri and Bose reconcile with Bharathi, and are overjoyed to hear about her release. Bharathi rushes to Amutha's place to share the good news, but there she is shocked to see Amutha being gang-raped by her husband Nagappan and his friends. True to her righteous self, Bharathi shoots Nagappan with his hunting rifle and ultimately surrenders herself at the police station.

== Cast ==
- Nizhalgal Ravi as Thazhamuthu
- Radha[voice artist: actress sripriya] as Bharathi
- Ra. Sankaran
- Vijayan as landlord Paramanandham
- Nassar as Advocate Singara Sithan
- Charle as Bose
- Livingston as Nagappan
- M. K. Muthu as Puratchi Mani in a special appearance
- Kutty Padmini as Amutha
- Disco Shanti
- Vani as Bhavani Ammal
- Priya Balakrishnan as Sarojini (Radha's younger sister)

== Production ==
Nyaya Tharasu marked the directorial debut of K. Rajeshwar, who previously wrote scripts for films like Panneer Pushpangal (1981), Kadalora Kavithaigal (1986) and Solla Thudikuthu Manasu (1988). Nyaya Tharasu is a remake of the Malayalam film Panchagni and has a screenplay written by M. Karunanidhi.

== Soundtrack ==
The soundtrack was composed by Shankar–Ganesh. All lyrics were penned by Vairamuthu.

Song	Singer	Length
"Thodu Vaanam Romba"	P. Susheela	05:06
"Vennila Ennodu Vantha"	Mano	05:21
"Vaanam Arugil Oru"	K. J. Yesudas	03:55
"Kalyana Penn Pola"	Malaysia Vasudevan, K. S. Chithra	05:52
"Yaarukku Arudhaal Yaaro"	K. J. Yesudas, P. Susheela	04:58

== Reception ==
P. S. S. of Kalki lauded the film's cinematography but felt the stunt sequences would dismay fans. Nyaya Tharasu won the Tamil Nadu State Film Award for Third Best Film, and Ravi won the Cinema Express Award for Best Supporting Actor.
