= Thamarai (film) =

- Poster
- Directed by: K. K. Rajsirpy
- Written by: K. K. Rajsirpy
- Produced by: K. K. Rajsirpy
- Starring: Napoleon; Rupini; Rohini
- Cinematography: A. Karthik Raja
- Edited by: B. Lenin; V. T. Vijayan
- Music by: Deva
- Production company: Kalai Sirpy
- Release date: 19 August 1994
- Running time: 130 minutes
- Country: India
- Language: Tamil

Thamarai (transl. Lotus) is a 1994 Indian Tamil language drama film directed and produced by K. K. Rajsirpy. The film stars Napoleon, Rupini and Rohini. It was released on 19 August 1994.

== Plot ==
According to the prophecy, Kali temple has to be shifted in Madurai Veeran temple's place. This prophecy creates troubles between the two communities of the village. In the meantime, Thamarai (Napoleon) comes back from jail to help the "Madurai Veeran" community against the vicious village chief Subbarayan (Rajesh).

Five years back, a brute Thamarai came to Subbarayan's village. Being short-tempered, he clashed against the ruthless Subbarayan many times. Thamarai and Poogodai fell in love with each other but the poor palm wine seller Sarasu (Rupini) developed a soft corner for Thamarai. Poogodai later got married with a rich groom and Thamarai went to jail for cutting the hand of the groom's father. The next day, the groom committed suicide.

During the Madurai Veeran temple festival, Subbarayan plans to demolish the Madurai Veeran temple but Thamarai prevents it. In the confrontation, Sarasu died by saving Thamarai. What transpires next forms the rest of the story.

== Cast ==
- Napoleon as Thamarai
- Rupini as Sarasu, an alcohol seller who loves Thamarai
- Rohini as Poongodai, Thamarai’s love interest
- Rajesh as Subbarayan, Poongodai’s father
- S. S. Chandran as Poosari, Maniarasu’s father and Subbarayan’s sidekick
- R. Sundarrajan as Veerappan
- Supergood Kannan as Maniarasu, Poosari’s son and Elanji’s love interest
- Poorani as Elanji, Maniarasu’s love interest
- Kavitha
- Vijaya Chandrika
- A. K. Veerasamy as Sangili
- Kumarimuthu as Manickam
- Thideer Kannaiah
- Suryakanth
- Krishnamoorthy as Semalai
- Nalinikanth
- Bayilvan Ranganathan
- Vellai Subbaiah
- Durai Ramachandran
- A. Madhur Swamy
- Nadesh
- Alex as Parisal

== Production ==
Actor Napoleon, who played villains and character roles until then, signed up to play for the first time the hero role. But the film that first got released in which he had played the hero role was Seevalaperi Pandi.

== Soundtrack ==
The soundtrack was composed by Deva.

No.	Title	Lyrics	Singer(s)	Length
1.	"Aattu Mandhaiya Otti Rotta"	Vairamuthu	Mano, Sindhu	4:41
2.	"Aththi Maram Pooththathe"	Vairamuthi	Chandrabose	5:09
3.	"Enge Then Thuli Iru Kaiyil Ottaamal"	Vairamuthi	Mano, Sunandha	4:55
4.	"Madurai Veeran Sami"	Vairamuthi	Swarnalatha	4:59
5.	"Mukka Marakka Moonguthaiya"	Deva	S. P. Sailaja	4:34
6.	"Vellai Kili Oruththi"	Vairamuthu	K. S. Chithra	4:47
