= Naalaya Seidhi =

1992 film by G. B. Vijay

- Poster
- Directed by: G. B. Vijay
- Written by: Rajaram Raghunath (dialogues)
- Screenplay by: G. B. Vijay
- Story by: G. B. Vijay
- Produced by: K. S. Srinivasan; K. S. Shivaraman
- Starring: Prabhu; Khushbu; Goundamani; Senthil
- Cinematography: Shiva
- Edited by: B. Lenin; V. T. Vijayan
- Music by: Adithyan
- Production company: Sivasree Pictures
- Release date: 14 August 1992
- Running time: 146 minutes
- Country: India
- Language: Tamil

Naalaya Seidhi (transl. News of tomorrow) is a 1992 Indian Tamil-language action thriller film, directed by G. B. Vijay in his debut and produced by K. S. Srinivasan and K. S. Shivaraman. The film stars Prabhu, Khushbu, Goundamani and Senthil. It was released on 14 August 1992.

== Cast ==
- Prabhu as Madhan / Manmadhan
- Khushbu as Anu / Anuradha
- Goundamani
- Senthil
- Jai Ganesh
- Jaishankar as Dhakshinamoorthy
- Rocky
- Archana Puran Singh
- C. R. Saraswathi as Savithiri (Madhan's stepmother)
- Yuvasree
- S. R. Vijaya
- Kavithasree
- Baby Priyanka
- Charuhasan
- S. N. Vasanth
- Sethu Vinayagam
- K. S. G. Venkatesh
- Raviraj
- Srikanth
- Gopi
- Ponnambalam
- Kullamani
- Omakuchi Narasimhan
- Swaminathan

== Production ==
Naalaya Seidhi is the directorial debut of G. B. Vijay.

== Soundtrack ==
Soundtrack was composed by Adithyan. For the dubbed Telugu version Repati Vaartha, all lyrics were written by Rajasri.

Tamil
No.	Title	Lyrics	Singer(s)	Length
1.	"Manmadha Konjavaa"	Muthulingam	Malgudi Subha
2.	"Mandhiram Chonnadhu"	Piraisoodan	S. P. Balasubrahmanyam, K. S. Chithra
3.	"Jimkana Pattedukkum"	Kalidasan	S. P. Balasubrahmanyam
4.	"Uyire Unnai Idhayam"	Muthulingam	P. B. Sreenivas, Sangeetha Katti
5.	"Ponmalai Neram"	Kadhal Mathi	S. P. Sailaja

Telugu
No.	Title	Singer(s)	Length
1.	"Manmada Aasha"	K. S. Chithra, Sudha
2.	"Moondara Unnadi"	Mano, K. S. Chithra
3.	"Pora Sombera"	Mano
4.	"Munipencha"	K. S. Chithra, Sudha

== Release and reception ==
Naalaya Seidhi was initially scheduled to release in July 1992, but released on 14 August. Malini Mannath of The Indian Express wrote, "There is never a dull moment though at times the screenplay sounds illogical". K. Vijiyan of New Straits Times called it "a gripping, fast-moving story, with punchy, witty dialogue". Sundarji of Kalki praised the cinematography, editing, locations, music and actors citing they all contributed bricks to this masala palace.
