= Thuraimugam =

- Poster
- Directed by: K. Rajeshwar
- Written by: K. Rajeshwar
- Produced by: Georgi George
- Starring: C. Arun Pandian; Shobana
- Cinematography: G. P. Krishna
- Edited by: B. Lenin; V. T. Vijayan
- Music by: Adithyan
- Production company: Megnam Productions
- Release date: 28 October 1996
- Running time: 150 minutes
- Country: India
- Language: Tamil

Thuraimugam (transl. Port) is a 1996 Indian Tamil-language crime drama film directed by K. Rajeshwar. The film stars C. Arun Pandian and Shobana, with Livingston, Alex, Poornam Viswanathan, Charle, Jai Ganesh and Kavitha playing supporting roles. It was released on 28 October 1996.

== Plot ==
Naamam was a union leader respected by the labourers. He lived with his wife Punniyalakshmi and two children in abject poverty. He even went on a hunger strike over a salary dispute. The last day of the hunger strike, he was poisoned by his friend Ethiraj and thus Ethiraj became the new union leader. Punniyalakshmi and her children suffered hunger, thus her baby girl died. Punniyalakshmi, with her child Johnny into her arms, jumped into the sea. They were later saved by labourers and admitted at the hospital. There, Johnny ran away from his mother.

Many years later, Johnny became a gangster in a port city. Johnny had met his mother but he still hated her and he preferred to maintain the distance between them. The police Inspector Alexander Veeramuthu waited for the right moment to arrest Johnny. Johnny was the friend of the transsexual Gowri Kumar who was Ethiraj's son. One night, Gowri Kumar killed a prostitute. Johnny was then wrongly accused with Gowri Kumar for killing the prostitute. At the court, Gowri Kumar was sentenced to life imprisonment, whereas Johnny got a seven-year prison sentence.

Seven years later, Johnny is urged to take revenge on the public prosecutor Ramanujam. His first attempt to murder him fails. So he decides to spoil his daughter Rukkumani's life and he even stops her wedding. In the meantime, Johnny clashes with the smuggler Ethiraj. When Ethiraj's henchmen try to kill Johnny, his mother Punniyalakshmi intervenes and dies. Ethiraj then dies in a car accident. Fate leads Johnny to marry Rukkumani. Rukkumani then changes him into a good person and Johnny starts to work as a labourer in the port. All goes well until Gowri Kumar is released from jail. What transpires next forms the rest of the story.

== Cast ==
- C. Arun Pandian as Johnny
- Shobana as Rukkumani
- Livingston as Gowri Kumar
- Alex as Ethiraj
- Poornam Viswanathan as Ramanujam, Rukkumani's father
- Charle as Jana
- Jai Ganesh as Johnny's father (guest appearance)
- Kavitha as Punniyalakshmi
- Georgi George as Inspector Alexander Veeramuthu
- K. R. Savithri as Mangalam, Rukkumani's mother
- Disco Shanti
- Anusha as Radha, Rukkumani's mother
- Shakeela
- M. R. Krishnamurthy as Narayanan
- Manager Cheena as Doctor
- Master Udaya Raj as Johnny (child)
- Mahendran as Alexander Veeramuthu
- Nellai Kabilan as Pattakathi Paalayan
- Jayamani
- Vincent Roy

== Production ==
The shoot of the film took place in natural surroundings in and around Madras harbour. The director desisted from using any sets for the sake of authenticity.

== Soundtrack ==
The soundtrack was composed by Adithyan, with lyrics by the film director K. Rajeshwar.

Song	Singer(s)	Duration
"Chinna Chinna"	K. S. Chithra	5:32
"Rukkumani Wrongapora"	K. S. Chithra	4:37
"Soda Bottle"	Suresh Peters, Adithyan	5:46
"Yeanda Porandha"	M. G. Sundar	4:21
"Amma Amma"	Suryaraja	4:11
"Raja Rajavin"	S. P. Balasubrahmanyam, K. S. Chithra	4:11

== Release and reception ==
The film, which was initially read for release in October 1995, was delayed for an entire year, before its eventual release on 28 October 1996. The Hindu wrote, "The director embellishes each the various segments with suitable situations and songs, the drama content not losing its fire. His choice of angles for the action sequences matches a foreign movie."
