= R. S. G. Chelladurai =

Indian actor (1936–2021)

- Born: R. Samuel Gnanadoss Chelladurai; 2 November 1936
- Died: 29 April 2021 (aged 84); Chennai, Tamil Nadu, India
- Occupation: Actor
- Years active: 2003-2021

R. Samuel Gnanadoss Chelladurai (2 November 1936 – 29 April 2021), also known as Ayya Chelladurai, was an Indian actor, known for playing supporting roles in Tamil films as a father and as a grandfather. His breakthrough performance came in the film, Theri (2016).

== Career ==
Chelladurai began his acting career in church acting troupes, before moving on to work in theatre. As a day job, he worked at the government headquarters. While his theatre colleagues received opportunities to work with director Shankar in his earlier films, Chelladurai had narrowly lost out on chances. He later made his film debut with B. Lenin's Ooruku Nooruper (2003). He made several collaborations with S. Shankar in Anniyan (2005), Sivaji (2007) and Nanban (2012).

Chelladurai often appeared in films as a father or grandfather, and worked on over 100 films. He later notably appeared in films including Maari (2015) where he featured in a comedic role alongside Dhanush and Robo Shankar. Chelladurai won acclaim for his role in Theri (2016).

== Filmography ==
- Ooruku Nooruper (2003)
- Kanavu Meippada Vendum (2004)
- Anniyan (2005)
- Veyil (2006)
- Sivaji (2007)
- Nanban (2012)
- Karuppampatti (2013)
- Raja Rani (2013)
- Kaththi (2014)
- Maari (2015)
- Theri (2016)
- Kanavu Variyam (2017)
- Spyder (2017)
- Aramm (2017)
- Tik Tik Tik (2018)
- Goli Soda 2 (2018)
- Airaa (2019)
- Natpe Thunai (2019)
- Karuppankaatu Valasu (2020)
- Bhoomi (2021)

== Death ==
He died following a heart attack on 29 April 2021, at his residence in Chennai’s Periyar Nagar. He was 84 years old.
