= Indira Vizha =

2009 film by K. Rajeshwar

- Theatrical release poster
- Directed by: K. Rajeshwar
- Written by: K. Rajeswar
- Produced by: Ashok K. Kotwani
- Starring: Srikanth; Namitha; Shruti Marathe
- Cinematography: Jey Camil Alex
- Edited by: RaghuBob
- Music by: Yatish Mahadev
- Production company: ANKK Movies
- Release date: 10 July 2009
- Country: India
- Language: Tamil

Indira Vizha is a 2009 Indian Tamil-language erotic thriller film written and directed by K. Rajeshwar and produced by Ashok K. Kotwani. The film stars Srikanth, Namitha, and Shruti Marathe (in her Tamil debut), with Nassar, Vivek, Ragasya, Radha Ravi, and Y. G. Mahendra in supporting roles. The music was composed by newcomer Yatish Mahadev. It began its first schedule on 11 February 2008 and was released on 10 July 2009.

The film revolves around sexual harassment at work. It is loosely based on the Hindi film Aitraaz, which itself was based on the American film Disclosure.

== Plot ==
Kamini plans to get back at her ex-lover Santhosh Srinivasan by reentering his life as the wife of his boss John Kumaramangalam alias JK. Santhosh is the creative head of a television channel called Teen TV (though it does indulge in political exposés). He is married to Savithri Duraisimaalu, and his life turns topsy-turvy when JK reinstates Kamini as the head of the TV channel, a promotion that Santhosh had anticipated for himself. Following this, Kamini starts hurling sexual harassment accusations at Santhosh.

== Cast ==
- Srikanth as Santhosh Srinivasan
- Namitha as Kamini
- Vivek as Oppilla Mani
- Nassar as John Kumaramangalam (JK)
- Shruti Marathe as Savithri Duraisimaalu (credited as Hema Malini)
- Ragasya as Stella
- Y. G. Mahendran as Advocate
- Vasu Vikram
- Alex
- Vijay Viswanathan
- Radha Ravi as Judge Sattanathan
- Anju as Sattanathan's Daughter

Uncredited

- Nizhalgal Ravi
- Manobala
- Bayilvan Ranganathan
- Anu Mohan
- Chaams

== Production ==
Raghuvaran had been signed up and completed a photo shoot for the film. He died during the production and was replaced by Nassar. Malavika was initially part of the cast but backed out. She was replaced by newcomer Hema Malini.

== Soundtrack ==
The soundtrack was composed by the debutant Yathish Mahadev, with lyrics by Vairamuthu. It includes a remix of "Oru Kinnathai", composed by K. V. Mahadevan for Vasantha Maligai (1972).

Track listing
No.	Title	Singer(s)	Length
1.	"Mogamma"	Hariharan, Sujatha
2.	"Oru Kinnathai"	M. K. Balaji, Priyadarshini
3.	"Kashmir Konduva"	Yatish, Anushka Manchanda
4.	"Naan Oru"	Sayanora Philip, Megha

== Critical reception ==
The Times of India wrote, "With so much meat, all you need is a simple, no-nonsense screenplay. However, the director changes track frequently, delving into comedy which is as crisp as yesterday's papadam left on the dining table." The Hindu wrote, "An ably fractured screenplay leaves Indira Vizha tottering even before it can take off." Deccan Herald wrote, "Indira Vizha is neither engaging nor entertaining. This risque and ribald tripe takes audiences on a peek-a-boo(b) show". The New Indian Express wrote, "Rajeshwar in his earlier films had revealed a strong script sense. But here he falters".
