= Vigneshwar =

- Poster
- Directed by: R. Raghu
- Written by: R. Raghu; K. C. Thangam (dialogues)
- Screenplay by: R. Raghu
- Produced by: Kovai Mani
- Starring: Karthik; Khushbu
- Cinematography: K. C. Dhivakar
- Edited by: P. R. Shanmugam
- Music by: Sangeetha Rajan
- Production company: Anbu Lakshmi Films
- Distributed by: MGM Films
- Release date: 23 June 1991
- Country: India
- Language: Tamil

Vigneshwar (/vɪɡneɪʃwər/) is a 1991 Indian Tamil-language crime thriller film directed and co-written by R. Raghu. The film stars Karthik, Khushbu, and Radha Ravi in the lead roles. It was released on 23 June 1991.

== Cast ==
- Karthik as ACP Vigneshwar IPS
- Khushbu as Ramya Rajendran
- Radha Ravi as Amir Nath
- Geetha as Padmini
- Vijayakumar as DIG Rajendran
- Delhi Ganesh as Vidhyasagar
- Junior Balaiah as Stranger
- Vasu Vikram
- Girish Pradhan as Anand
- V. K. Ramasamy in guest appearance

== Soundtrack ==
The soundtrack was composed by Sangeetha Rajan.

Track listing
No.	Title	Lyrics	Singer(s)	Length
1.	"Oh Ya Oh Vigneshwar"	Vaali	S. P. Balasubrahmanyam, K. S. Chithra
2.	"Vikki Thannikinni"	Piraisoodan	Mano, K. S. Chithra
3.	"Yeh Poongatre"	Kalidasan	S. P. Balasubrahmanyam, K. S. Chithra
4.	"Selathu Rottu Mele"	Kovai Mani	S. P. Balasubrahmanyam

== Critical reception ==
N. Krishnaswamy of The Indian Express wrote, "Vigneshwar is a crime thriller with the attendant cliches in tow the vendetta line [...] But the glitter and sheen of cinematic package [...] gives a beguiling manner to the film."
