= Kovilpatti Veeralakshmi =

- Title card
- Directed by: K. Rajeshwar
- Written by: K. Rajeshwar
- Starring: Simran; Sonu Sood; Sherin
- Cinematography: Ashok Kumar
- Edited by: V. T. Vijayan
- Music by: Adithyan
- Production company: Hemanth Cine Factory
- Release date: 4 July 2003
- Running time: 192 minutes
- Country: India
- Language: Tamil

Kovilpatti Veeralakshmi is a 2003 Indian Tamil language film directed by K. Rajeshwar. Simran dubbed in her own voice for the first time in this film with some dialogues dubbed by Deepa Venkat. The film was the last to have music composed by Adithyan, who went on to host a show on Jaya TV.

== Plot ==
The film is about a woman who is battling against untouchability in a village. Veeralakshmi and her fellow Dalits undergo unbearable torture due to casteism from a brutal police force. In their village, the inspector of police is the feudal lord, who beats up the poor men and rapes the women, with his behaviour emulated by his officers. Pushed to the limits by the extent of her subjugation, Veeralakshmi rises in revolt.

== Cast ==
- Simran as Veeralakshmi
- Sherin as Seetha
- Sonu Sood as Rajiv Mathur
- Alex
- Akshaya Rao
- Gowthami Vembunathan as Veeralakshmi's mother
- Indhu
- Thambi Ramaiah as Tea Shop Owner
- Abhinayashree

== Production ==
The film was initially planned to be started in 1996 with Shwetha Menon in the lead role, but was delayed. The project was launched in early 2000 with Menon, but was discontinued. Simran was subsequently cast to play the lead role. Some crucial scenes were shot at a forest near Theni.

== Soundtrack ==
The soundtrack was composed by Adithyan, while lyrics written by K. Rajeshwar.

Track listing
No.	Title	Singer(s)	Length
1.	"Dheem Tharikida"	Sirkazhi Sivachidambaram
2.	"Eleloa Elelo"	Harini
3.	"Kakka Mugathazhaga"	Swarnalatha, Solar Sai
4.	"Ola Kudisaiyiley"	Mano, Harini
5.	"Oyilakka Kondaiyeley"	Pushpavanam Kuppusamy

== Reception ==
The film was released on 4 July 2003 alongside Ice, Whistle and Kaadhal Kondein. Malathi Rangarajan of The Hindu wrote that "a thread of sincerity runs through the entire film that makes different from the action flicks one is used to". Malini Mannath of Chennai Online wrote "The scenes are stark and realistic, with the expected violence and gore. There is no lag in the narration, even as one empathises with the plight of Veeralakshmi and her gang, and follows them through their tortuous journey, to the fatal end. The script is well-etched, the dialogue realistic, the narration focused". Visual Dasan of Kalki praised the performance of Simran, Sonu Sood and Alex but felt the director was not sincere enough and took inspiration from films like Seevalaperi Pandi, Malaiyoor Mambattiyan and Bandit Queen to create the protagonist's character. Sify wrote "Director Rajeshwar has used all the commercial elements like dance, fights and ladies sentiments to pad up the film, which leads to a long drawn out steamy, sentimental climax, which spoils the tempo of the film. Far too many cinematic licences have been added to make it a mass entertainer". The film bombed at the box-office.
