= Adithyan =

Indian composer

- Born: Adithyan Prithviraj; 9 April 1954; Madras (now Chennai) or Thanjavur, Madras State (now Tamil Nadu), India
- Died: 5 December 2017 (aged 63) Hyderabad, Telangana, India
- Occupation: Music director
- Years active: 1992–2003

Adithyan (birth name Titus; 9 April 1954 – 5 December 2017) was an Indian film score and soundtrack composer. He has predominantly scored music for Tamil films apart from working in Telugu and Malayalam films. He sang several songs for his own films and for other composers. He created and released many Tamil pop and remix albums in India and Malaysia.

He also hosted his own television cooking show 'Aadithyan's Kitchen' on Jaya TV for 8 years. He was a self-taught artist and his paintings adorn walls of several homes.

== Career ==
Having started his career as sound designer, he made his debut as composer with Amaran (1992) with songs like "Vethala Potta" and "Chandirane Suriyane" becoming chartbusters. He went on to work in over 30 films including Maman Magal, Luckyman, Asuran, Sevaalaperi Pandi, Kovilpatti Veeralakshmi among others. Lyricist Piraisoodan in an interview with B. H. Abdul Hameed revealed that he suggested the name 'Adithyan' when he entered the film music.

== Discography ==
As composer

Year	Film	Language	Notes
1992	Amaran	Tamil	
1992	Naalaya Seidhi	Tamil	
1992	David Uncle	Tamil	
1993	Minmini Poochigal	Tamil	
1993	Yamudanniki Mogudu	Telugu	
1994	Seevalaperi Pandi	Tamil	
1994	Chinna Pulla	Tamil	
1995	Thottil Kuzhandhai	Tamil	
1995	Udhavum Karangal	Tamil	
1995	Lucky Man	Tamil	
1995	Asuran	Tamil	
1995	Maa Manithan	Tamil	Two songs
1995	Maaman Magal	Tamil	
1995	Rajakeeyam	Malayalam	
1996	Aruva Velu	Tamil	
1996	Kizhakku Mugam	Tamil	
1996	Lathi Charge	Telugu	
1996	Thuraimugam	Tamil	
1996	Harbour	Malayalam	
1996	Koottaali	Tamil	Film unreleased
1997	My India	Tamil	
1997	Roja Malare	Tamil	
1998	Colour Kanavugal	Tamil	
1998	Aasai Thambi	Tamil	
1999	Sivan	Tamil	
1999	Kaama	Tamil	
2000	Athey Manithan	Tamil	
2001	Super Kudumbam	Tamil	
2003	Kovilpatti Veeralakshmi	Tamil	
2003	Vaanam Vaazhthattum	Tamil	
2004	Aasai Vechhen	Tamil	Film unreleased

As singer

Year	Film	Song(s)	Notes
1992	David Uncle	"Neeyum Thirudan"	
1995	Thottil Kuzhandhai	"Kannala Valai"	
1995	Lucky Man	"Ammama", "Palaana Party"	
1995	Asuran	"Chakku Chakku Vathikuchi"	
1996	Poove Unakkaga	"Oh Pyari"	music by S. A. Rajkumar
1996	Aruva Velu	"Kaadu Mazhai"	
1996	Kizhakku Mugam	"Kadhal Enbadhu"	
1996	Thuraimugam	"Soda Bottle"	
1998	Aasai Thambi	"Summa", "Dont Care"	
1999	Sivan	"Egypt Naattu"	

== Filmography ==
As actor

Year	Film	Role	Notes
2001	Narasimha	D' Souza	
2003	Thilak		
2008	Velli Thirai		

== Death ==
He died at the age of 63 in Hyderabad, the capital of Telangana, on 5 December 2017.
