= Sundara Pandian =

- Directed by: R. Raghu
- Written by: T. K. Bose
- Produced by: R. Raghu
- Starring: Karthik; Swathi; Heera Rajagopal; Vadivelu; Manivannan
- Cinematography: B. Balamurugan
- Edited by: P. R. Shanmugam
- Music by: Deva
- Production company: Jupiter Film Makers
- Release date: 20 February 1998
- Running time: 135 min
- Country: India
- Language: Tamil

Sundara Pandian is a 1998 Indian Tamil-language comedy film, directed and produced by R. Raghu, starring Karthik, Swathi and Heera Rajagopal.

== Plot ==
Pandi (Karthik) is an uneducated villager who is in love with his niece Karthika (Swathi) but she doesn't love him. Sundar (Also Karthik) is the son of a rich businessman and lives without his father's love in the city.

One day, Pandi decides to leave his village to earn money and find a wife. Meanwhile, Sundar comes to Pandi's village to swim at the river, and the villagers catch him. After seeing Pandi's mother, Sundar stays there and he gets the mother's affection.

Pandi doesn't find a job in the city, Sundar's father then brought Pandi with him and thought that his son became mad. There, Ramya (Heera Rajagopal), a police officer falls in love with Pandi. Meanwhile, Kottaval (Manivannan), Ashok Raj's enemy, escapes from the psychiatrist hospital to kill Ashok Raj and his son Sundar.

Karthika falls in love with Sundar and Karthika's father (Alex) wants her to forget him. The enemy of Karthika's father decides to kill him but Sundar saves him. Karthika's father apologizes to his elder sister and plans to marry his daughter to his saviour. Sundar reveals his real identity to Karthika.

Sundar leaves the village to find Pandi. Kottaval and his henchmen kidnap Ashok Raj and Pandi. Sundar saves them and sends Kottaval to jail.

== Cast ==
- Karthik as Pandi / Sundar
- Swathi as Karthika
- Heera Rajagopal as Ramya
- Vadivelu as Pavadai
- Manivannan as Kottaval
- Alex as Karthika's father
- Vasu Vikram as Vasu
- Bharathi Vishnuvardhan as Pandi's mother
- Gandhimathi
- C. R. Saraswathi
- Pasi Sathya
- Senthamarai
- Kumarimuthu
- Junior Balaiah

== Soundtrack ==
The soundtrack was composed by Deva.

| Song | Singer(s) | Lyrics | Duration |
|---|---|---|---|
| "Raathiri Raathiri" | Mano | Kalidasan | 5:14 |
| "Beeda Beeda" | Krishnaraj | Ponniyin Selvan | 4:18 |
| "Kumbadana Pona" | Mano, Devie Neithiyar | Kalidasan | 5:12 |
| "Kayil Vandha" | Gopal Rao | Kalidasan | 5:08 |
| "Malkudi Malkudi" | Malgudi Subha | Vaasan | 4:18 |
