= Amaran (1992 film) =

1992 film directed by K. Rajeshwar

- DVD cover
- Directed by: K. Rajeshwar
- Written by: K. Rajeshwar
- Produced by: K. Rajeshwar
- Starring: Karthik; Bhanupriya
- Cinematography: P. C. Sreeram
- Edited by: Raghu; Babu
- Music by: Adithyan
- Production company: Annalakshmi Films
- Release date: 15 January 1992
- Running time: 150 minutes
- Country: India
- Language: Tamil

Amaran (transl. The immortal) is a 1992 Indian Tamil-language action gangster film written, directed, and produced by K. Rajeshwar. The film stars Karthik and Bhanupriya, with Radha Ravi, Prathap K. Pothan, and Shammi Kapoor in supporting roles. The film had music by Adithyan and cinematography by P. C. Sreeram. It was released theatrically on 15 January 1992.

== Plot ==
An orphaned child helps Govindan escape from a bunch of gangsters. The grateful Govindan names the child Amaran and brings him up. After Govindan's demise, his wife raises Amaran, who grows up to become a kindhearted slum lord. One day, Amaran encounters a strange man, Raja Varma, who repeatedly persuades him to take on a heartless don named Aandava Perumal, who has a violent and brutal past. Amaran keeps ignoring Raja Varma, but after Aandava Perumal's goons murder Raja Varma, he learns that Aandava Perumal had also destroyed his own family when he was a child. Amaran gives refuge to Raja Varma's daughter Sivagaami, and they fall in love. Amaran soon starts sparring with Aandava Perumal, with deadly consequences for Amaran's adopted family. Sivagaami and a grievously injured Amaran escape to Goa, where they are taken care of by an underworld don named Miranda. Amaran continues to work for him for a while and marries Sivagaami. After a few years, he returns to Tamil Nadu to take on his sworn enemy. A bloody conflict ensues in which Amaran's son is killed. The film ends with Amaran killing Aandava Perumal to avenge his son's death.

== Cast ==
- Karthik as Amaran
- Bhanupriya as Sivagaami
- Radha Ravi as Aandava Perumal
- Prathap K. Pothan as Raja Varma
- Shammi Kapoor as Don Miranda
- Vijayakumar as "Sepoy" Govindan, Amaran's foster father
- Manjula Vijayakumar as Amaran's foster mother
- Livingston (credited as Ranjan) as Inspector Duraipandi, Amaran's father
- Uday Prakash as Chinna Perumal
- Silk Smitha as Manga
- Disco Shanti as Shanti
- M. R. Krishnamurthy
- Latha
- Ra. Sankaran as Jinnah's father
- Piraisoodan as Astrologer
- Vikas Rishi as Jinnah
- Pereira as Shooter
- Mahima
- K. Rajpreeth
- Chitti
- Master Vasanth
- Baby Anitha
- Rajendran as Henchman (uncredited)

== Production ==
Amaran marked Shammi Kapoor's Tamil debut.

== Soundtrack ==
The music was composed by Adithyan. The song "Vethala Potta" marks Karthik's debut at playback singing. For the dubbed Telugu version Amar, all lyrics were written by Rajasri.

Tamil

Song	Singer(s)	Lyrics	Duration
"Vethala Potta"	Karthik	Piraisoodan	4:33
"Tring Tring"	Srividya	Piraisoodan	4:13
"Chandirare Suriyare" – Viswa Guru	K. J. Yesudas	Vairamuthu	4:40
"Vasanthame Arugil Vaa"	S. P. Balasubrahmanyam	Piraisoodan	4:47
"Musthafa Musthafa" – Viswa Guru	Karthik	Vairamuthu	4:41
"Chandirane Suriyane"	S. P. Balasubrahmanyam	Piraisoodan	5:40
"Paanja Janiyam Oothiduvaen"	T. M. Soundararajan	Piraisoodan	3:38
"Abhyam Krishna Naragaasuran"	Sirkazhi G. Sivachidambaram, T. K. Kala	Piraisoodan	2:51

Telugu

Song	Singer(s)	Duration
"Vasanthama Cherava"	S. P. Balasubrahmanyam	4:48
"Chakkanaina Chukkallara"	S. P. Balasubrahmanyam	4:47
"Musthafaa Musthafaa"	S. P. Balasubrahmanyam	4:51
"Thamalapaku Shokila"	S. P. Balasubrahmanyam	4:51
"Chakkanaina Chukkallara"	S. P. Balasubrahmanyam	4:30
"Kalla Bajaru"	K. S. Chithra	4:31

== Release ==
The film premiered on 12 January 1992 in Chennai, sponsored by Sankara Nethralaya, and was theatrically released three days later, on 15 January.

== Dropped sequel ==
A sequel was announced in 2015, but never came to fruition.
