= Lucky Man (1995 film) =

- Theatrical release poster
- Directed by: Pratap Pothen
- Screenplay by: Pratap Pothen
- Story by: S. V. Krishna Reddy
- Produced by: K. Prashath
- Starring: Karthik; Goundamani; Senthil; Sanghavi
- Cinematography: Aravind Kamalanathan
- Edited by: B. Lenin; V. T. Vijayan
- Music by: Adithyan
- Production company: Prashath Art Films
- Release date: 14 April 1995
- Country: India
- Language: Tamil

Lucky Man is a 1995 Indian Tamil-language fantasy comedy film directed by Pratap Pothen. The film stars Karthik, Goundamani, Senthil, and Sanghavi, while Manjula Vijayakumar, Radha Ravi, Vinu Chakravarthy, and Thyagu play supporting roles. It is a remake of the 1994 Telugu film Yamaleela. The film was released on 14 April 1995 and failed at the box office.

== Plot ==
The film starts in heaven where Yama's assistant Chitragupta loses the Brahma Suvadi book written by Shiva, Vishnu, and Brahma to administrate human birth, death, post-death punishment, and rebirth. The Brahma Suvadi falls into a city in Tamil Nadu, and Gopi, a young man, gets hold of the book and becomes rich using it. At the same time, Brahma come to know that the book is lost and orders Yama and Chitragupta to locate the book within one month. Chitragupta fears that if the book is seen by humans, chaos will happen. However, Yama assures him that only the details of the person who is viewing the same will be shown by the book. Meanwhile, Yama and Chitragupta come to Tamil Nadu to search for the book. One day, Gopi learns about his mother's death date through that book. Now, Gopi wants to save his mother and win his lover. Gopi's opponent Sivaraman, a ruthless don, wants to know Gopi's secret of success, and he plans to steal the book from Gopi by abducting his mother and lover. In the climax, Yama helps Gopi secure the book from Sivaraman and kill him. Yama also spares Gopi's mother's life for his help.

== Cast ==
- Karthik as Gopi
- Goundamani as Yama
- Senthil as Chitragupta
- Sanghavi as Gopi's lover
- Manjula Vijayakumar as Gopi's mother
- Radha Ravi as "Cheating" Sivaraman
- Vinu Chakravarthy as Inspector Ranjith Kumar
- Thyagu as Gopi's friend
- Jayamani as Police Constable
- Silk Smitha as Jill Jill Rojamani
- Besant Ravi
- Pandu as Editor
- Vijayakumar in a guest appearance

== Soundtrack ==
The music composed by Adithyan and lyrics written by Piraisoodan. The song "Yaar Seidha Maayam" is based on "She's Always a Woman" by Billy Joel.

Track listing
No.	Title	Singer(s)	Length
1.	"Pallana Party"	Adithyan, Sangeetha Sajith	4:18
2.	"Yaar Seidha Maayam"	S. P. Balasubrahmanyam, Sangeetha Sajith	5:10
3.	"Ammamma Anandham"	K. S. Chithra	5:07
4.	"Yama Dharmaraja"	S. P. Balasubrahmanyam, K. S. Chithra	5:09
5.	"Akum Bakum"	Suresh Peters, Sujatha	4:54
6.	"Ammama Aayiram"	Mano	5:07
Total length:			29:45

== Release and reception ==
Lucky Man was released on 14 April 1995. K. Vijiyan of New Straits Times wrote, "Lucky Man stands out as a story with a difference. It has enough laughs to make a pleasant 2 1/2 hours". R. P. R. of Kalki wrote that, in contrast to the film's title, those going to watch the film were "unlucky men". The film failed commercially.
