= R. Raghu =

Indian film director and television producer

- Other name: David Nathan
- Occupation: Director
- Years active: 1991-present

R. Raghu is an Indian film director and television producer who has worked on Telugu and Tamil films and serials. In 2015, he changed his name to David Nathan. He is the son of veteran actor V. K. Ramasamy.

== Career ==
Raghu is an active director since 1990s, and made four consecutive drama films with Karthik in the lead role. He began his career with Vigneshwar (1991) and continued directing films until his final release, Sundara Pandian (1998), where Karthik portrayed dual roles. However he started doing serials and stopped doing films since. In 2015, he changed his name as David Nathan and provided story for Telugu films like Gentleman (2016) and Yuddham Sharanam (2017).

== Filmography ==
=== Director ===
| Year | Film | Notes |
|---|---|---|
| 1991 | Vigneshwar | |
| 1993 | Chinna Kannamma | |
| 1996 | Katta Panchayathu | |
| 1998 | Sundara Pandian | |

=== Actor ===
| Year | Film | Role | Notes |
|---|---|---|---|
| 1992 | Suyamariyadhai | J. K. | Credited as V. K. Raghunath |

=== Writer ===
| Year | Film | Notes |
|---|---|---|
| 2008 | Kodaikanal | |
| 2016 | Gentleman | |
| 2017 | Yuddham Sharanam | |

=== Television Serial ===
| Year | Film | Notes |
|---|---|---|
| 2001 | Enga Vettu Penn | |
| 2010 | Godavari | |
