= Chinna Kannamma =

1993 film by R. Raghu

- Poster
- Directed by: R. Raghu
- Written by: Panchu Arunachalam (dialogues)
- Screenplay by: R. Raghu
- Story by: R. Raghu
- Produced by: Aru. Shanmuganathan; Aru. Subramaniam
- Starring: Karthik; Gautami
- Cinematography: K.C. Dhivakar
- Edited by: P. R. Shanmugam
- Music by: Ilaiyaraaja
- Production company: Geetha Chithra Combines
- Distributed by: Dhami Pictures
- Release date: 29 January 1993
- Running time: 120 minutes
- Country: India
- Language: Tamil

Chinna Kannamma is a 1993 Indian Tamil language film directed by R. Raghu. The film stars Karthik and Gautami, with Suhasini, Nassar and Shamili in supporting roles. It was released on 29 January 1993.

== Plot ==
Aravind, a youngster who was transferred for a job, falls in love with Gayathri. Despite their parents' refusal, they marry and soon Gayathri gets pregnant. Few days before her labour, she had a brief conversation with another young lady, Uma who was also waiting for the delivery of her second child. On the night of labour, both Gayathri and Uma gave birth to two baby girls respectively.

Due to a minor fire accident, while moving the other babies to a safer place, a young nurse mistakenly gave the two newborn female babies to the wrong couple. When she informed the senior nurse about this, the latter didn't allow to make this issue bigger as this will worsen the reputation of their hospital, causing the young nurse to be in guilt.

After two years, Aravind and Gayathri with their daughter, Saranya lives happily. Later, Gayathri dies and Aravind shifts to Ooty with his daughter. In Ooty, he befriends a couple, Pradeep and Uma, and their kids become friends too. One day, Uma's daughter dies due to heart disease. Not being able to bear the loss of their only daughter, they decided to ask Aravind to allow then to adopt Saranya, which he undoubtedly disagrees.

One day, the young nurse who once took care of Uma and the late Gayathri falls sick and before dying, she revealed to Uma that Priya is not their daughter, but someone else's. Soon Pradeep finds out that it is Saranya who is their original daughter. After Aravind refused on giving up Saranya to Pradeep and Uma, the couple takes the affair to the court and finally wins the case, which allows Saranya to be with Uma and Pradeep. Saranya doesn't want to live with them, so Uma later lets her to go back to Aravind.

== Cast ==
- Karthik as Aravind
- Gautami as Gayatri
- Suhasini as Uma
- Bhagyalakshmi alias Bhagyasri as Nurse Padma
- Nassar as Pradeep
- Shamili as Saranya
- Ra. Sankaran as Shankar
- V. K. Ramasamy as Ramanathan
- Charle as Pichandi
- Vadivukkarasi as a judge (cameo appearance)
- LIC Narasimhan as a doctor (cameo appearance)
- Kamala Kamesh as Gayatri's mother
- Baby Pooja as Priya
- Master Siva as Tarun
- Baby Divya

== Soundtrack ==
The soundtrack was composed by Ilaiyaraaja. The song "Enthan Vaazhkaiyin" attained popularity.

Song	Singer(s)	Lyrics	Duration
"Thayilla Pillai"	S. Janaki, Minmini	Panchu Arunachalam	4:14
"Kaadhal Then Kodukka"	Mano, S. Janaki	Vaali	4:14
"Chinna Chinna Poongodi"	S. Janaki, Minmini	Piraisoodan	3:29
"Enthan Vaazhkaiyin"	Mano	Panchu Arunachalam	5:00
"Sithaadai Theeney"	Swarnalatha, Mano	Shanmuga Panchu	5:04
