= K. Rajeshwar =

Indian film director

- Born: India
- Other name: Somasundareswar
- Education: Loyola College, Chennai
- Occupation: Film director
- Years active: 1989–present

K. Rajeshwar is an Indian film director, who has worked in Tamil films. He was active primarily as a film maker and a writer in the 1990s collaborating in ventures which often included Pratap Pothan.

== Career ==
Rajeshwar grew up in Mumbai and became interested in films, as his father was also in the business. He later schooled in Tirunelveli, before moving to Chennai and enrolled in Loyola College, Chennai to study Economics. During his time at college, he was actively involved in writing scripts for skits and plays before his passion for cinema and writing, saw him join the Adyar Film Institute. Rajeshwar started his career as scriptwriter under the name Somasundareshwar. His first script was Aval Appadithan (1978), and was adapted by his college senior C. Rudhraiya from a short story to a feature-length film featuring Rajinikanth and Kamal Haasan. Upon release, the film won critical acclaim and is widely considered as one of the finest Tamil films of all time. He also went on to write scripts for successful films including the romantic dramas Panneer Pushpangal (1981), Kadalora Kavithaigal (1986) and Solla Thudikuthu Manasu (1988). He changed his screen name to Rajeshwar, following the insistence of director Bharathiraja, who wanted to distinguish him from a different director called Somasundar during the period.

Rajeshwar then gained acclaim after writing the script and screenplay for the successful Kamal Haasan starrer Vetri Vizha (1989), before going on to win the second runner up award for the Best Film Award by the Tamil Nadu State for his first directorial venture, Nyaya Tharasu (1989). The film was a remake of the Malayalam film Panchagni, and had a screenplay written by M. Karunanidhi. He then went on to make two successful films with Karthik in the lead with Idhaya Thamarai and Amaran, before writing the script for Pratap Pothan's Seevalaperi Pandi (1994). He planned a project titled Kovilppatti Veeralakshmi as early as 1996 with Swetha Menon but could not find financiers for the venture. Both the latter films were inspired by real-life characters and prompted Rajeshwar to head back to their respective villages and have an elongated recce, while writing the script.

He subsequently ended up starting Kovilpatti Veeralakshmi with Simran in the lead role, though despite much pre-release publicity, the film released in 2003 and became a commercial failure. Rajeshwar announced a film titled Malligai Malare in 2007 with Namitha roped in to play five roles, though the film never took off. He returned in 2009 by directing Indira Vizha, featuring Srikanth, Namitha and Sruthi Marathe, though the film garnered poor reviews at release. Rajeshwar then co-wrote the story for the Hindi film Ajab Prem Ki Ghazab Kahani alongside Rajkumar Santoshi and in 2010, revealed that he was set to direct the Tamil remake of that film titled Dhideer Nagaril Oru Kadhal Gaana with his son Ranjan in the lead role. The film began production but eventually did not release. In 2015, he revealed that another one of his son's had taken over the project and it was in its pre-production stages. Later in 2015, he began work on a sequel to Amaran starring Karthik, but the project was shelved after the actor fell ill.

== Filmography ==
=== As director ===
Year	Film	Notes
1989	Nyaya Tharasu	3rd – Tamil Nadu State Film Award for Best Film
1990	Idhaya Thamarai	
1992	Amaran	
1996	Thuraimugam	
2000	Athey Manithan	
2003	Kovilpatti Veeralakshmi	
2009	Indira Vizha	

=== As writer ===
- Aval Appadithan (1978)
- Panneer Pushpangal (1981)
- Ezhavathu Manithan (1982)
- Meendum Oru Kaathal Kathai (1985)
- Kadalora Kavithaigal (1986)
- Thulasi (1987)
- Solla Thudikuthu Manasu (1988)
- Vetri Vizha (1989)
- Seevalaperi Pandi (1994)
- Ajab Prem Ki Ghazab Kahani (2009; Hindi)

=== As lyrics ===
- Thuraimugam (all songs)
