= Aasai Thambi =

1998 film

- VCD cover
- Directed by: Senthilnathan
- Written by: Liyakat Ali Khan (dialogues)
- Based on: Parinda (Hindi)
- Produced by: S. Mani
- Starring: Arun Pandian; Abbas; Anju Aravind
- Cinematography: D. Shankar
- Edited by: G. Jayachandran
- Music by: Adithyan
- Production company: Cheranaadu Movie Creations
- Release date: 18 September 1998
- Country: India
- Language: Tamil

Aasai Thambi (transl. Dearest Younger Brother) is a 1998 Indian Tamil-language crime drama film directed by Senthilnathan. The film stars Arun Pandian, Abbas and Anju Aravind in the lead roles, while Manivannan and Ajay Rathnam portray supporting roles. Adithyan was the music composer and it was released on 18 September 1998. It is a remake of the Hindi film Parinda (1989).

== Cast ==
- Arun Pandian as Vinoth
- Abbas as Vijay (voice dubbed by Vikram)
- Anju Aravind as Indhu
- Manivannan
- Ajay Rathnam
- Jayabharathi
- Madhan Bob

== Soundtrack ==
The music was composed by Adithyan.

Song	Singers	Lyrics
"I Love You"	Mano, Anuradha Sriram	Palani Bharathi
"Pollathathu"	Manimegalai	Kamakodiyan
"Summa Summa"	Adithyan	Kamakodiyan
"Ponnanathu"	Krishnachandran, Manimegalai	Kamakodiyan
"Don't care"	Mano, Adithyan	Palani Bharathi
"Rangoli Rawali"	Gangai Amaran, S. P. Balasubrahmanyam	Palani Bharathi

== Release ==
The film released in September 1998, despite being ready for release from late 1997. The film performed poorly at the box office.
