= Athey Manithan =

- Title card
- Directed by: K. Rajeshwar
- Written by: K. Rajeswar
- Produced by: T. S. Revathi
- Starring: Livingston; Maheswari; Lakshmi
- Cinematography: K. Muthu Kumar
- Edited by: V. Udhaya Sakaran
- Music by: Adithyan
- Production company: Annai Cine Arts
- Distributed by: Raj Co
- Release date: 28 April 2000
- Running time: 130 minutes
- Country: India
- Language: Tamil

Athey Manithan (transl. Same person) is a 2000 Indian Tamil language horror film directed by K. Rajeshwar. The film stars Livingston, Maheswari and Lakshmi. It was released on 28 April 2000.

== Plot ==
Mandhira Moorthy, a medical representative, will soon marry Bhavani, who is from a rich family. Mandhira Moorthy is deeply in love with Bhagavathi, a poor dancer, and she becomes pregnant. His miser aunt pressures Mandhira Moorthy for money so he decides to leave the village for the city.

Later, Bhagavathi comes to see Mandhira Moorthy after a while. Shocked to see her before his marriage, Mandhira Moorthy brings her to a remote place. He marries her in front of a statue of God and he then kills the harmless Bhagavathi. Mandhira Moorthy feels guilty for his deed.

After getting to Bhavani, Mandhira Moorthy suspects Bhavani of being haunted by Bhagavathi.

== Cast ==
- Livingston as Mandhira Moorthy
- Maheswari as Bhavani
- Lakshmi as Bhagavathi
- Major Sundarrajan as Bhavani's father
- Vennira Aadai Moorthy as Bhagavathi's father
- Alex as Appusamy
- Bhanu Prakash as Doctor
- V. Rishiraj as Socrates
- Manager Cheena as Marriage broker
- Prakash Menon
- Nellai Vasanthan as Astrologer
- Gowthami Vembunathan as Mandhira Moorthy's aunt
- John Babu in a special appearance

== Soundtrack ==
The soundtrack was composed by Adithyan.

Song	Singer(s)	Lyrics	Duration
"Idiyappam"	Swarnalatha	Na. Muthukumar	4:23
"Jananam Undu"	Livingston	Piraisoodan	4:35
"Pugai Padam"	Srinivas	Piraisoodan	5:25
"Thazhal Madal" (solo)	Harini	Piraisoodan	4:31
"Thazhal Madal" (duet)	K. Prabakaran, Devi Neithiyar	Piraisoodan	5:06
"Vandanam Vandanam"	Srinivas	Piraisoodan	4:32

== Reception ==
Malini Mannath of Chennai Online wrote, "A slick narrative style, some well-rendered, melodious songs (composed by Adithyan), and a creditable performance from Livingston and Lakshmi set this film apart from a routine ‘ghost story.‘ But it is no edge-of-the-seat thriller that makes one’s heart beat faster and gives one a jolt now and then".
