= Meipporul =

- Theatrical release poster
- Directed by: Natty Kumar; Krish Bala
- Screenplay by: Natty Kumar; Krish Bala; Narayan Sundararajan; Rani Jayakumar
- Story by: Natty Kumar
- Produced by: Natty Kumar; Krish Bala
- Starring: Krish Bala; Anusha
- Cinematography: Chris Eldridge
- Edited by: B. Lenin
- Music by: Score: John Mazzei; Songs: Rahul Atul; Aub Delane; Ponch Satrio; Nandha Swamee
- Production company: Dreams on Frames
- Release date: 1 May 2009
- Running time: 126 minutes
- Countries: India; United States
- Languages: Tamil; English

Meipporul, also known as The True Meaning, is a 2009 Indian-American Tamil language thriller film produced and directed by Natty Kumar and Krish Bala. The film stars Krish Bala and Anusha, with Natty Kumar, Narayan Sundararajan, Rani Jayakumar, Lee Kuhn, Christopher Martin Bauer, Suren Vijaykumar, and Ritu Bhargava playing supporting roles.

The film was theatrically released on 1 May 2009. It won the Tamil Nadu State Film Award Special Prize.

== Plot ==
An Indian couple is killed by their babysitter Lisa (Lee Kuhn) and she takes their daughter with her in a car. At the petrol pump, Devi (Anusha) notices Lisa's suspicious behaviours and sees the girl asking for help in the back seat of the car. Devi alerts the police, and Lisa is thus arrested.

Sam, a successful neurosurgeon, and Devi, a bold reporter working for a renowned Tamil magazine, are a happily married Indian couple living in San Francisco. They live normal lives in the company of friends Vishwa and his girlfriend Lakshmi. One day, Sam comes across Rajan, who claims to be an astrophysicist working for NASA, and Rajan hands him his wallet that he had lost in a bar. Sam then meets Rajan in a bar, and Rajan tells him that his next surgery is going to be a failure. Sam performs surgery on a girl, and the surgery turns out to be a success. Unfortunately later that day, the girl dies, thus upsetting Sam. Rajan claims to have extrasensory perception (ESP) and can predict the future with uncanny precision. Sinisterly enough, all his predictions turn out to be true, and Sam, who is a rational person, begins to believe him.

At one point, Rajan informs Sam that he would die in less than a week: on 10 August 2007. Sam seeks solace to his friend Vishwa, who advises him to not believe Rajan. On 9 August, Devi survives a car accident with minor injuries, but she loses her baby. The couple then returns home. A few hours before 10 August, Lisa enters Sam's house with a gun and tries to kill him. Chris, a detective, tries to enter the house to save Sam, but Lisa shoots Chris. Sam manages to unarm Lisa. Devi takes Lisa's gun, but she accidentally shoots Sam. Chris shoots Lisa dead and succumbs to his injury. Devi takes an injured Sam, and Rajan, who arrives with his car at that moment, takes Sam to his car. Vishwa, who comes from nowhere, knocks out Rajan with a golf club.

Later, it is revealed that Rajan's real name is Gowtham and he is married to Lisa. Rajan and Lisa were involved in child trafficking. When Lisa was arrested because of Devi, Rajan decided to take revenge on her. To do this, he befriended Sam, posed as a scientist, and made him believe that he had ESP. Rajan had done everything to make his predictions true. He then planned to kill Devi and frame Sam for the murder. Meanwhile, Vishwa sent his friend Chris, a private detective, to follow Rajan and Vishwa and discovered Rajan's plan. Rajan is finally arrested for his crime.

One year later, on 10 August 2008, Sam, the pregnant Devi, Vishwa, and Lakshmi place flowers on the grave of the detective Chris, who had sacrificed his life that day. The film ends with Rajan watching them at the cemetery.

== Cast ==
- Krish Bala as Sam
- Anusha as Devi
- Natty Kumar as Rajan/Gowtham
- Narayan Sundararajan as Vishwa
- Rani Jayakumar as Lakshmi
- Lee Kuhn as Lisa
- Christopher Martin Bauer as Chris
- Suren Vijaykumar as Dharan
- Ritu Bhargava as Sashi
- Vasanthi Raghavan as Vasanthi
- Karunakaran Padmanabhan as Palani
- Daryl Anthony Harper as Alan
- Shweta as Kiran
- Thirumudi Thulasiraman as Devi's coworker (uncredited)

== Production ==
Natty Kumar, son of T. N. Janakeraman who produced Mogamul (1994), Krish Bala; a software engineer for Napster; and Narayan Sundararajan, a research scientist in Intel, teamed up and decided to make a Tamil film because they wanted to shoot it entirely in the United States. The film was edited by B. Lenin, photographed by American cinematographer Chris Eldridge, and the background music was composed by John Mazzei who had several Hollywood films to his credit. The film was shot in San Francisco and other parts of in California in 40 days, while post-production took place in Chennai.

== Soundtrack ==
The soundtrack was composed by Rahul Atul, Aub Delane, Ponch Satrio and Nandha Swamee.

Track listing
No.	Title	Lyrics	Music	Singer(s)	Length
1.	"Meiyye Meiyye"	Perungavikko Va. Mu. Sethuraman	Rahul Atul	Rahul Nambiar, Latha	4:15
2.	"Get Away Day"	Aub Delane, Ponch Satrio	Aub Delane, Ponch Satrio	Aub Delane	3:07
3.	"Sandhana Maram"	Yugandar	Rahul Atul	Srinivas	3:49
4.	"Kalyana Kaviyam"	Yugandar	Rahul Atul	Prasanna, Rita Thyagarajan	4:15
5.	"Minnum Minuum"	Yugandar, Thendral R. Ramkumar	Nandha Swamee	Nandha Swamee	4:00
Total length:					19:26

== Release and reception ==
The film was released on 1 May 2009 in India. Malathi Rangarajan of The Hindu said, "Many things about Meipporul appeal - some don’t. Yet, for first-timers who are new to the medium, the effort is laudable". Pavithra Srinivasan of Rediff.com wrote, "Despite its rather stilted performance, Meipporul is refreshing for its Hollywood-style take on things. Worth a watch". Mythily Ramachandran gave it 2.5 out of 5 and said, "This is a film that you can enjoy with the family, popcorn and coke in hand. Meipporul certainly breaks away from the stereotypes and is a laudable effort by first-timers. Bhama Devi Ravi of The Times of India gave 2.5 out of 5 and wrote, "A good screenplay coupled with slice-of-life acting will get you the target audience, and frankly 'Meipporul' scores from the word go". Malini Mannath of Chennai Online said, "The heartening thing about the movie is that the narrative never tries to resort to gimmicks and the momentum is maintained through genuine use of suspense element".
