= Katta Panchayathu =

- VCD cover
- Directed by: R. Raghu
- Written by: T. K. Bose
- Produced by: R. Vasanthi
- Starring: Karthik; Kanaka
- Cinematography: Rajarajan
- Edited by: L. Kesavan
- Music by: Ilaiyaraaja
- Production company: N. R. Enterprises
- Release date: 7 June 1996
- Running time: 135 min
- Country: India
- Language: Tamil

Katta Panchayathu (transl. Kangaroo court) is a 1996 Indian Tamil language film directed by R. Raghu and written by T. K. Bose. The film stars Karthik and Kanaka, with Goundamani, Senthil, Radha Ravi, Ponvannan, V. K. Ramasamy, Ravichandran, Srividya, and Bharathi Vishnuvardhan playing supporting roles. It was released on 7 June 1996.

== Plot ==
Shenbagam is a Koothu actress in a remote village, and she lives with her little sister Mallika. Ponnazhagi Naachiyar is a panchayathu chief since the death of her husband Ramadurai. She has two sons: Kathirvel and Chinnadurai. Kathirvel, the elder, is an uneducated brute who woos his relative Shenbagam, whereas Chinnadurai studies in the city.

One day, at the village court, a poor woman claims that the rich Sidambaram and she are in love with each other and she is now pregnant. Ponnazhagi clears Sidambaram due to a lack of evidence and states that the poor woman is greedy. The poor woman later tries to commit suicide, but the kind-hearted Rajadurai saves her on time. Rajadurai later beats up Sidambaram and he admits its mistake, so Rajadurai arranges their wedding, dismissing Ponnazhagi's judgement. Rajadurai was adopted and brought up by the Muslim man Rowther.

Thereafter, Shenbagam's sister Mallika reaches puberty. Kathirvel, who was supposed to arrange the puberty ceremony as per the custom, is in the city with his brother Chinnadurai. Considering the circumstances, Rajadurai arranges the ceremony. When Kathirvel becomes aware of this matter, he and Rajadurai fight. Kathirvel then threatens Shenbagam and Mallika to kill them if the two sisters break the village customs once again. Shenbagam cannot bear Kathirvel's mental torture, so Rajadurai promises Shenbagam that he will marry her. Ponnazhagi, meanwhile, had expected her son Chinnadurai to be a kind-hearted person, but he is, in fact, a rude womaniser. Ponnazhagi decides to let her son become the panchayat chief all the same, but during the ceremony of the transfer of power, Rowther claims that Rajadurai is the only one who can be the next panchayat chief, and then Rajadurai's mother Parvathi arrives determined to confirm it.

Many years back, the panchayat chief Ramadurai and Parvathi were a happily married couple and lived with their baby son Rajadurai. One day, Parvathi caught her husband Ramadurai and his relative Ponnazhagi having sex, so Parvathi arranged the wedding between Ramadurai and Ponnazhagi. She then left his home with her son. Shortly before Ramadurai died, he whispered "Parvathi" multiple times in his bed, and it irked Ponnazhagi. The villagers went to Parvathi's house to inform her about this. There, a half naked-man ran away from the house. The villagers suspected the innocent Parvathi for having an affair with another man and locked her in her house until the end of the death ceremony. Later, Ponnazhagi plotted to kill Parvathi and Rajadurai. Rowther then adopted Rajadurai, and Parvathi disappeared. Rowther and Rajadurai left the village and then came back many years later. It is later revealed that Kathirvel was adopted and he was the son of the man who ran away from Parvathi's house.

Back to the present, the villagers support Rajadurai, who is the first son of Ramadurai. Afterwards, Kathirvel and Chinnadurai attempt to murder their mother Ponnazhagi and want to blame the innocent Rajadurai, but Rajadurai saves Ponnazhagi on time. Ponnazhagi then realises her sins and apologises to Rajadurai and Parvathi in front of the villagers. Kathirvel and Chinnadurai kidnap Shenbagam, Ponnazhagi, and Parvathi, but Rajadurai finally saves them. During the fight, Kathirvel and Chinnadurai accidentally stab each other to death. The film ends with Rajadurai becoming the new village panchayat chief with the blessings of Ponnazhagi and Parvathi.

== Cast ==
- Karthik as Rajadurai
- Kanaka as Shenbagam
- Goundamani as Toddy man
- Senthil as Chinna Thambi
- Radha Ravi as Kathirvel
- Ponvannan as Chinnadurai
- V. K. Ramasamy as Rowther
- Ravichandran as Ramadurai
- Srividya as Ponnazhagi Naachiyar
- Bharathi Vishnuvardhan as Parvathi
- Anusha as Mallika
- R. K as Sidambaram
- Raviraj as Kathirvel's father
- Rajkrishna as Toddy man's co-brother
- Karuppu Subbiah as Subbiah
- Tirupur Ramasamy as Ramasamy
- Joker Thulasi as Village doctor
- King Kong
- Kovai Senthil as Toddy man's father-in-law
- Chelladurai as Villager
- Vijay Ganesh as Krishnamoorthy
- Chandrakala as Sarasu
- Kavithasri in a special appearance

== Soundtrack ==
The soundtrack was composed by Ilaiyaraaja. The song "Oru Chinna Mani", sung by his daughter Bhavatharini, attained popularity.

Song	Singer(s)	Lyrics	Duration
"Oru Chinna Mani"	Jolly Abraham, Bhavatharini	Vaali	5:10
"Mayavarathu Maya Kuthirai"	Arunmozhi	Muthulingam	5:02
"Meesa Mela Kayya"	Mano	Ponnadiyan	4:55
"Thalaivan Oruthan"	Ilaiyaraaja	Mu. Metha	3:36
"Veyndina Veyndum"	Arunmozhi, Devie Neithiyar	Kamakodiyan	4:41
