= Maalai Sooda Vaa =

1975 film by C. V. Rajendran

- Theatrical release poster
- Directed by: C. V. Rajendran
- Written by: Chithralaya Gopu (dialogue)
- Screenplay by: Vennira Aadai Moorthy
- Story by: Vennira Aadai Moorthy
- Produced by: S. S. Prakash; S. Rajan
- Starring: Kamal Haasan; Kumari Manjula
- Cinematography: Srikanth
- Edited by: B. Kandasamy
- Music by: Vijaya Bhaskar
- Production company: Babu Movies
- Release date: 1 August 1975
- Country: India
- Language: Tamil

Maalai Sooda Vaa (transl. Come, wear the garland) is a 1975 Indian Tamil-language film directed by C. V. Rajendran. The film stars Kamal Haasan and Kumari Manjula. The script was written by Vennira Aadai Moorthy, and dialogue by Chithralaya Gopu. It was one of the very early films in which Kamal Haasan acted as the hero. The film was released on 1 August 1975.

== Plot ==
Murali, a hero with a unique style, attracts girls on a dance show. One evening, Radha sees his performances and his charming cuteness. Approaching Murali for her love, he refused to do, because he has wider westernization vision but later he realizes he also has feelings for her and they end up together.

== Cast ==
- Kamal Haasan as Murali
- Kumari Manjula as Radha
- Moulee
- Major Sundarrajan
- Manorama as Murali's mother
- V. K. Ramasamy
- Manimala
- Vennira Aadai Moorthy
- Maali
- S. V. Ramadas
- I. S. R.
- Krishnamurthy
- Ramarao
- Gemini Balu
- Selvakumar
- 'Douglas' Kannaiya
- Soundarajan
- Sreenandhagopal
- Usilai Mani
- Lalitha

== Production ==
Maalai Sooda Vaa directed by C. V. Rajendran. The script was written by Vennira Aadai Moorthy, and dialogue by Chithralaya Gopu. It was one of the very early films in which Kamal Haasan acted as hero. The final length of the film's prints were 3,810.45 metres (12,501.5 ft) long.

== Soundtrack ==
The music was composed by Vijaya Bhaskar, with lyrics by Vaali. The song "Yaarukku Yar Sondham" is set to the Carnatic raga Natabhairavi.

Song	Singers	Length
"Aasai Oru Mani"	S. P. Balasubrahmanyam, Vani Jairam	03:15
"Kadavul Potta Kanakku"	T. M. Soundararajan	03:07
"Pattu Poochigal"	S. P. Balasubrahmanyam, Vani Jairam	02:51
"Yaarukku Yar Sondham"	K. J. Yesudas	03:21

== Reception ==
Kanthan of Kalki wrote the screenplay is almost developed similar to Bobby, and the producers should be praised for not making the comedy too much and boring. The film was also reviewed by Navamani.
