= Ethanai Konam Ethanai Parvai =

- LP record cover
- Directed by: B. Lenin
- Based on: Ethanai Konam Ethanai Parvai by Jayakanthan
- Starring: Thiagarajan; Sripriya; Suresh; Nalini
- Cinematography: B. Kannan
- Edited by: B. Lenin
- Music by: Ilaiyaraaja
- Production company: V. M. Movies
- Country: India
- Language: Tamil

Ethanai Konam Ethanai Parvai (transl. Many angles, many views) is an unreleased Indian Tamil-language film that was completed in 1983. It was directed and edited by B. Lenin, photographed by his brother B. Kannan, starring Thiagarajan, Sripriya, Suresh and Nalini. Based on Jayakanthan's novel of the same name, the film was to have been Lenin's directorial debut, but remains unreleased due to financial troubles. It was again in the news when Indo-Russian Cultural Friendship Society decided to release an album containing the songs of Jayakanthan in 2016.

== Cast ==
- Thiagarajan
- Sripriya
- Suresh
- Nalini

== Soundtrack ==
The music for this film was composed by Ilaiyaraaja. The song "Alaipayuthe Kanna", a remix of Venkata Kavi's song of the same name, became popular.

| Song | Singers | Lyrics |
|---|---|---|
| "Ethanai Konam Ethanai Parvai" | Malaysia Vasudevan & Chorus | Jayakanthan |
| "Enna Vithiyasam" | Malaysia Vasudevan, Gangai Amaran | Jayakanthan |
| "Vidhaitha Vidhai" | Deepan Chakravarthy, B. S. Sasirekha | Gangai Amaran |

Track listing
| No. | Title | Length |
