= Nalla Kaalam Porandaachu =

- Theatrical release poster
- Directed by: T. P. Gajendran
- Screenplay by: I. S. N. Ravi
- Story by: Antony
- Produced by: S. Gowari; S. Ramamoorthy
- Starring: Prabhu; Rajesh; Ramya Krishnan; Sujatha
- Cinematography: Babu
- Edited by: T. K. Rajan
- Music by: Shankar–Ganesh
- Production company: Mother Cini Productions
- Release date: 14 January 1990
- Running time: 114 minutes
- Country: India
- Language: Tamil

Nalla Kaalam Porandaachu (transl. A good time is born) is a 1990 Indian Tamil-language film, directed by T. P. Gajendran and produced by S. Gowari and S. Ramamoorthy. The film stars Prabhu, Rajesh, Ramya Krishnan and Sujatha, while Senthil, Anandaraj, and Delhi Ganesh play supporting roles. It was released on 14 January 1990.

== Plot ==
Trying to save his blind mother Shenbagam by a transplant, Muthu discovers that his father Asogan is alive and has been waiting on death row. Arrested for murder and sentenced to death by hanging, on a forced testimony, he awaits his execution. Nevertheless, innocent of alleged acts, he had finally resigned himself of his fate, because nothing more connected him. His son, at the moment, makes it a duty to exonerate him by helping him to escape and to find one or several of the real culprits. Law enforcement is thrown on his heels, with an order to shoot him on sight. But nobody can stop the determination of the young man, not even his beloved Uma, a police officer.

== Cast ==
- Prabhu as Thangamuthu (Muthu)
- Rajesh as Asogan, Muthu's father
- Ramya Krishnan as Police officer Uma (Kannamma, Mahalakshmi)
- Sujatha as Shenbagamu, Muthu's mother
- Senthil as Karuppatti, Muthu's friend
- Anandaraj as Joe
- Delhi Ganesh as Uma's father
- Kuladeivam Rajagopal as Pathaby
- Pandu as Advocate
- K. K. Soundar as Train Passenger
- Loose Mohan as Policeman
- Sethu Vinayagam as Jailor
- Gundu Kalyanam as Asogan's agent
- Typist Gopu as Producer
- Omakuchi Narasimhan as Assistant Producer
- Kuyili as Meena, a dancer
- Priya as Rosy
- Sathyapriya as Maria, Rosy's mother
- Antony
- Cenchi Krishnan
- Shankar–Ganesh as himself

== Soundtrack ==
Soundtrack was composed by Shankar–Ganesh.

Track listing
No.	Title	Lyrics	Singer(s)	Length
1.	"Chinna Pillai"	Vaali	S. P. Balasubrahmanyam
2.	"Chinna Vennila"	Vaali	S. P. Balasubrahmanyam
3.	"Paattu Oru Paattu"	Piraisoodan	S. P. Balasubrahmanyam
4.	"Chinna Kutty Meena"	Vaali	Malaysia Vasudevan, S. P. Sailaja
5.	"Kaalai Paartha"	Vaali	S. P. Balasubrahmanyam, K. S. Chithra
6.	"Kelamma Unathi Vithai"	Piraisoodan	S. P. Balasubrahmanyam

== Release and reception ==
Nalla Kaalam Porandaachu was released on 14 January 1990 alongside another Prabhu starrer Kavalukku Kettikaran. P. S. S. of Kalki found the film to be watchable despite logical mistakes and artificial sets, and praised the film's title for its positivity.
