= Pondatti Pondattithan =

- Directed by: Maniyan Sivabalan
- Screenplay by: Maniyan Sivabalan
- Story by: Venkat
- Produced by: Viji; Radha; Jai
- Starring: S. Ve. Shekher; Kadambari
- Cinematography: R. C. M. Kasthuri
- Edited by: S. Vijayakumar
- Music by: Gangai Amaran
- Production company: VRJ Films
- Release date: 11 July 1991
- Running time: 135 minutes
- Country: India
- Language: Tamil

Pondatti Pondattithan (transl. Wife is wife only) is a 1991 Indian Tamil-language comedy drama film directed by Maniyan Sivabalan. The film stars S. Ve. Shekher and newcomer Kadambari, with Janagaraj, Senthil, Manorama, V. K. Ramasamy, Vennira Aadai Moorthy, Sulakshana, Disco Shanti and Kovai Sarala playing supporting roles. It was released on 11 July 1991. The film was a remake of Telugu film Chalaki Mogudu Chadastapu Pellam.

== Plot ==
Rajagopal is a bachelor office clerk who lives with his clumsy and annoying grandmother in Vellore. Rajagopal wants to get married as soon as possible with a well-educated woman. So his grandmother suggests him to marry his uneducated cousin Lakshmi, but he refuses. After seeing her, he falls under the spell of the beautiful Lakshmi and he finally marries her. Unfortunately, due to various reasons, his first night gets delayed.

A few weeks later, Rajagopal's boss Krishnan promotes Rajagopal as his assistant manager in Chennai, so Rajagopal has to leave his home for the job. There, Rajagopal lives with Jai, an old friend from his college, in a small apartment. One night, Rajagopal helps a prostitute Padma who was chased by goons and the two take refuge in a hotel. At that time, the police raid the hotel and arrest the prostitutes and their clients, the police inspector Rajendran is none other than Krishnan's friend and he immediately informs Krishnan about the matter. When Krishnan comes to the hotel, the prostitute is mistaken by Krishnan to be Rajagopal's wife and Rajendran release them. Krishnan then accommodates Rajagopal and the prostitute in his guest house. Feared of being fired from his new job, Rajagopal pays Padma for acting like his wife in front of Krishnan. What transpires next forms the rest of the story.

== Cast ==
- S. Ve. Shekher as Rajagopal
- Kadambari as Lakshmi
- Janagaraj as Kathiresan
- Senthil as Sabapathy
- Manorama as Rajagopal's grandmother
- V. K. Ramasamy as Inspector Rajendran
- Vennira Aadai Moorthy as Krishnan
- Sulakshana as Ramajayam
- Disco Shanti as Padma
- Kovai Sarala as Janaki
- Y. Vijaya as Padma's sister
- Kumarimuthu as Pichaimuthu
- Loose Mohan as Kabali
- Manager Cheena as Manager
- Usilaimani as Iyer
- Seenu
- Venkatraman
- Kumaresan
- Poornima
- Sumathi

== Soundtrack ==
The music was composed by Gangai Amaran, who also wrote the lyrics.

Song	Singer(s)	Length
"Pondatti Pondattithan"	Manorama	2:54
"Unnai Vida Oorile"	S. P. Balasubrahmanyam, K. S. Chithra	3:50
"Poothade Poottu"	S. P. Balasubrahmanyam	4:23
"Adikkira Kai"	S. P. Balasubrahmanyam	3:48
"Maane Mayile"	K. J. Yesudas	4:11

== Reception ==
C. R. K. of Kalki said that in a comedy film, one should not look out for logic.
