= Idhaya Thamarai =

- Theatrical release poster
- Directed by: K. Rajeshwar
- Written by: K. Rajeshwar
- Produced by: M. Veda
- Starring: Karthik; Revathi
- Cinematography: P. C. Sreeram
- Edited by: P. Venkateswara Rao
- Music by: Shankar–Ganesh
- Production company: Amardeep Creations
- Release date: 14 January 1990
- Running time: 150 minutes
- Country: India
- Language: Tamil

Idhaya Thamarai (transl. Lotus of the heart) is a 1990 Indian Tamil-language romantic drama film directed by K. Rajeshwar, starring Karthik and Revathi. It was released on 14 January 1990.

== Plot ==
Vijay is an impulsive, angry, orphaned youth who falls in love with Manju, his fellow student in college. He mellows after the romance blossoms. However, during the college play of Romeo and Juliet where the two are cast, Vijay's rival, in an alcoholic prank, locks Vijay up and goes to play Romeo. Vijay, angered by this incident, especially after his planned attempt to kiss Manju as a part of the act, pours acid on his rival's face and is sent to prison. A few years later, he meets Manju, who is now married to her company owner Ranjith. Vijay wants her back, but it is later revealed that Ranjith married her in order to be saved from Vijay's enemy, who wants revenge for his face being scarred for life by destroying Manju. Ranjith protects and marries Manju. In the end, Vijay kills his rival and leaves Manju to lead a peaceful life.

== Cast ==
- Karthik as Vijay
- Revathi as Manju
- Nizhalgal Ravi as Ranjith
- Janagaraj as an absent-minded man
- Chinni Jayanth as Vijay's friend
- Charle as Drunkard
- Vennira Aadai Moorthy as Mandra Moorthy
- Pradeep Shakthi
- Disco Shanti

== Production ==
Some filming took place at the Kaj Schmidt Memorial, Madras.

== Soundtrack ==
The soundtrack was composed by Shankar–Ganesh, with lyrics written by Vairamuthu.

Song	Singer(s)	Duration
"Oh My Love"	S. P. Balasubrahmanyam	4:46
"Oru Kadhal Devadhai"	S. P. Balasubrahmanyam, K. S. Chithra	4:33
"Yaarodu Yaar Endra Kelvi"	S. P. Balasubrahmanyam	4:08
"Yedho Mayakkam"	Malaysia Vasudevan, Suja Radhakrishnan	5:18
"Unnai Yen Sandhithen"	P. Susheela	4:28
"Kanne Kadhavu Therandhidum"	S. P. Balasubrahmanyam, K. S. Chithra	4:41

== Reception ==
P. S. S. of Kalki praised the cinematography and performances of the lead artistes but found the film's soundtrack dated.
