= Kavalukku Kettikaran =

1990 film by Santhana Bharathi

- Poster
- Directed by: Santhana Bharathi
- Screenplay by: M. Karunanidhi
- Story by: Ananthu
- Produced by: V. Kalanithi; S. Thananchayan; R. Murugasamy
- Starring: Prabhu; Nirosha
- Cinematography: M. M. Rengasamy
- Edited by: Durairaj; R. Dhinakaran
- Music by: Ilaiyaraaja
- Production company: Thirai Koodam
- Release date: 14 January 1990
- Running time: 140 minutes
- Country: India
- Language: Tamil

Kavalukku Kettikaran is a 1990 Indian Tamil-language film, directed by Santhana Bharathi and written by M. Karunanidhi, starring Prabhu and Nirosha. It is a remake of the 1986 Malayalam film Nandi Veendum Varika. The film was released on 14 January 1990.

== Plot ==
Panjavarnam is a retired police constable and he wants that his anxious son Dilipan becomes also a police officer. Dilipan works in a school as a teacher and he falls in love with Arivukodi, a new teacher. She later accepts his love.

Panjavarnam manages to fire his son and sends him to the police training. Dilipan becomes a sub-inspector and he is transferred to Arivukodi's village. Arivukodi is also fired after slapping the school headmaster. Dilipan doesn't join immediately and lives with Siva. Balayya, a corrupt politician, spreads terror among the villagers.

Dilipan saves Arivukodi's father from Balayya's henchmen. Arivukodi tells the reason to her lover: Arivukodi's father and Balayya were rich villagers, Balayya wanted to appropriate his land. Balayya sent Arivukodi's father in jail, grabbed his land and Arivukodi's Mother committed suicide.

Siva, an angry villager, decides to sell his harvests in the city. Balayya's henchmen beat up Siva, but Dilipan saves by giving him his blood. Balayya rapes Chellakili, Siva's wife, in front of Dilipan and she commits suicide.

Dilipan joins as sub-inspector in the police station and he fails to arrest Balayya because of his political background. Back from the hospital, Siva decides to kill and Dilipan arrests him. Mannar reveals that Balayya stole the temple Murugan statue, he arrests Balayya and his superior releases Balayya.

Balayya kidnaps Siva from the jail and Dilipan is suspended. The villagers rebel against Balayya and his henchmen. During the confrontation, Balayya dies in a lorry accident.

== Cast ==
- Prabhu as SI Dilipan (Parthiban)
- Nirosha as Arivukodi (voice by Radhika Sarathkumar)
- Rajesh as Balayya
- Nassar as Siva
- V. K. Ramasamy as Panjavarnam
- Manorama as Ponnuthayi
- S. S. Chandran as Mannar
- Vennira Aadai Moorthy as a school headmaster
- Major Sundarrajan as a police trainer
- Pandu as Kannayya
- G. M. Sundar as Panneer
- R. S. Shivaji as Kittu
- T. S. Raghavendra as Arivukodi's father
- Aarthi as Siva's son
- Karunanidhi in a cameo appearance
- V. Gopalakrishnan
- Madhuri as Chella Kili

== Soundtrack ==
The soundtrack was composed by Ilaiyaraaja.

Song	Singer(s)	Duration	Lyrics
"Amma Amma"	Malaysia Vasudevan	4:37	Ilaya Bharathi
"Ithazhenum"	Mano, S. Janaki	5:15	Ilaya Bharathi
"Kavalukku"	Ilaiyaraaja	2:50	M. Karunanidhi
"Kutham"	Malaysia Vasudevan	4:58	Ilaya Bharathi
"Solai Ilangkuil"	Mano, K. S. Chithra	5:08	Ilaya Bharathi

== Release and reception ==
Kavalukku Kettikaran was released on 14 January 1990, alongside Prabhu starrer Nalla Kaalam Porandaachu. P. S. S. of Kalki praised the performances of the artistes.
