= David Uncle =

- Directed by: Guna
- Written by: Guna; Navalar (dialogues)
- Produced by: L. Vasu; K. Rajpreeth
- Starring: Anandaraj; Siva; Sivaranjani; Rekha; Sridevi Vijaykumar
- Cinematography: K. Rajpreeth
- Edited by: M. N. Raja
- Music by: Adithyan
- Production company: Aarthi International
- Release date: 25 September 1992
- Running time: 130 minutes
- Country: India
- Language: Tamil

David Uncle is a 1992 Indian Tamil-language film directed Guna. The film stars Anandaraj, Siva, Sivaranjani, Rekha and Sridevi Vijaykumar. It was released on 25 September 1992.

== Plot ==
The story begins with the minister Deivanayagam and his son who debated. Deivanayagam's son came with his wife Malathi and new-born daughter Devi, he believed that his father changed. On the other hand, Deivanayagam wanted his son back, leaving his wife and daughter but his son refused. Meanwhile, Deivanayagam's assistant Arumugam killed Deivanayagam in front of his son and Arumugam put the blame on him. Deivanayagam's son was arrested and then the new-born daughter was handed over to a beggar by Arumugam.

A few years later, Arumugam becomes a corrupt minister. He has a daughter Selvi who is in love with the poor man Raja. Regarding Malathi, she takes up a job as a teacher while Devi, who was forced to beg, is saved by the pickpocket David. In the past, the same Arumugam killed David's father Anthony and mother, he was separated from his sister Mary. Later, David becomes a good man and works hard to feed Devi. Finally, Malathi finds her daughter Devi and David finds his sister Mary who is in fact Selvi. Arumugam is determined to separate Raja and Selvi. David rescues the young lovers against the heartless Arumugam.

== Cast ==
- Anandaraj as David
- Siva as Raja
- Sivaranjani as Selvi / Mary
- Rekha as Malathi
- Sridevi Vijaykumar as Devi
- Goundamani as Gounder
- Senthil as Panniraj
- K. Rajpreeth as Arumugam
- R. P. Viswam as Deivanayagam
- Rajeev as Raghupathi
- Srikanth as Anthony, David's father
- Silk Smitha as Singari
- Sangeeta as Selvi's mother
- Kamala Kamesh
- Shanmugasundari as Malathi's mother
- Kumarimuthu
- Idichapuli Selvaraj
- Karuppu Subbiah
- Gundu Kalyanam as Nagarajan
- LIC Narasimhan

== Soundtrack ==
The soundtrack was composed by Adithyan.

Song	Singer(s)	Lyrics	Duration
"Azhage Poovil Seithano"	S. P. Balasubrahmanyam, K. S. Chithra	Kalidasan	5:16
"Devan Sabaiyinil"	Mano, Minmini	Piraisoodan	4:45
"Neeyum Thirudan"	Adithyan	Kalidasan	3:59
"Thattungadi"	S. P. Sailaja	Piraisoodan	4:38
"Thottutta"	S. P. Balasubrahmanyam, Swarnalatha	Kadhal Mathi	4:15
"Vayya Soodu Yerudhu"	Malgudi Subha	Piraisoodan	4:25

== Reception ==
Malini Mannath of The Indian Express said the film "never really takes off", criticising the screenplay as "loosely structured" and felt Rajeev was wasted; only Sridevi "steals the show".
