= Ooruku Nooruper =

2001 film by B. Lenin

- Title card
- Directed by: B. Lenin
- Screenplay by: B. Lenin; Prakash Menon
- Based on: Ooruku Nooruper by Jayakanthan
- Produced by: Lakshmanan Suresh
- Starring: Hans Kaushik; G. M. Sundar
- Cinematography: Alphonse Roy
- Edited by: Suresh Urs
- Music by: Arvind Jayashankar
- Production company: Ananda Movies
- Distributed by: National Film Development Corporation of India
- Release date: 12 December 2003
- Running time: 97 minutes
- Country: India
- Language: Tamil

Ooruku Nooruper (transl. A hundred people for the village) is a 2003 Indian Tamil-language film directed by B. Lenin and starring Hans Kaushik and G. M. Sundar. Based on the 1979 novel of the same name by Jayakanthan, the film focuses on capital punishment. It won two awards at the 49th National Film Awards, including the National Film Award for Best Feature Film in Tamil.

== Plot ==
Balan, a young artist, becomes a part of "Ooruku Nooruper", a revolutionary organisation. To promote the ideals of the group, he becomes a modern-day Robinhood, as looting becomes an integral part of his life. Anandan, a leftist freelance writer, supports Balan and runs a campaign against capital punishment. Being a part of a revolutionary group, Balan finds no time for his family. His wife Saroja feels she is alienated from her husband. In the meanwhile, Balan accidentally kills a priest while attempting a robbery and is sentenced to death. The organisation when gets to know this, ignores him and goes on with its activities as it believes cause more important than an individual.

== Cast ==
- Hans Kaushik as Balan
- G. M. Sundar as Anandan
- Julie as Saroja
- Bharathimani as Balan's father-in-law
- Archana as Anandhan's colleague
- R. S. G. Chelladurai as the church father
- Ganesh Babu as Victim
- Soori (uncredited)

== Accolades ==
- National Film Award for Best Direction – Ooruku Nooruper (2002).
- National Film Award for Best Feature Film in Tamil – Ooruku Nooruper (2002).
