= Chinna Pulla =

- Poster
- Directed by: K. Baskaran
- Produced by: Chinni Jayanth
- Starring: Chinni Jayanth; Revathi
- Cinematography: K. R. Ramsingh
- Edited by: Peter Bhabiah
- Music by: Adithyan
- Production company: Ashtalakshmi Creators
- Release date: 16 December 1994
- Running time: 150 minutes
- Country: India
- Language: Tamil

Chinna Pulla (transl. Little Child) is a 1994 Indian Tamil language drama film directed by Marumalarchi Bharathi, credited as K. Baskaran. The film stars Chinni Jayanth and Revathi, with Ramesh Aravind, Thalaivasal Vijay, Vijayakumar, Vadivukkarasi, Vennira Aadai Moorthy and Sathyapriya playing supporting roles. It was released on 16 December 1994. The film was one of the six films sent from Tamil Nadu for selection to the National Film Awards that year.

== Plot ==
Valliammai (Revathi) is a cheerful woman studying in college. She is an only child and she lives with her wealthy parents (Vijayakumar and Sathyapriya) in the city. For the college vacation, she compels her father to go to her father's native village: Ilandurai. As promised her father accompanies her to Ilandurai for the vacation. There, Valliammai is accommodated by her aunt Anjala (Vadivukkarasi). Anjala is the village's midwife, she has an intellectually disabled son named Vadivelu (Chinni Jayanth). Vadivelu only respects one person: the village chief Subramani (Thalaivasal Vijay). Vadivelu helps his cousin Valliammai to visit the village and he falls in love with her.

One day, Anjala has to leave the village for her work. Vadivelu and Valliammai stay alone in the house. A few days later, Valliammai has hyperemesis gravidarum: she starts to vomit a lot. She suspects Vadivelu for raping her that night. She hides the truth and leaves the village. In the city, her parents decide to prepare her wedding with a family friend: Madhan (Ramesh Aravind). Valliammai finally reveals the truth about her pregnancy to her parents, the wedding is cancelled and she then returns to the village. Anjala is in a state of shock that her son could rape a woman, she beats him up and Vadivelu flees terrified. Subramani appeases Vadivelu and he gets him into his house.

Subramani reveals that he was the one who raped Valliammai. That night, he brainwashed Vadivelu to give milk mixed with sleeping tablets to Valliammai. After drinking it, Valliammai fell asleep and Subramani raped her while Vadivelu waited in Subramani's house. Subramani fled the house, Vadivelu found Valliammai naked so he dressed her and slept near her.

Subramani did that to marry Valliammai. Valliammai refuses his marriage proposal. When Valliammai, Anjala and Subramani come to Subramani's house, Vadivelu is found dead: he drank pesticide. Valliammai turns berserk and kills Subramani, then she behaves like an intellectually disabled person.

== Cast ==
- Chinni Jayanth as Vadivelu
- Revathi as Valliammai
- Ramesh Aravind as Madhan (guest appearance)
- Thalaivasal Vijay as Subramani
- Vijayakumar as Valliammai's father
- Vadivukkarasi as Anjala
- Vennira Aadai Moorthy as Kanthan
- Sathyapriya as Valliammai's mother
- Anuja
- Rama Sekhar as Uluvai
- Mohan Raman as Kuppulingam
- Manager Cheena as Doctor
- King Kong
- Kanal Kannan as Bus conductor

== Soundtrack ==
The soundtrack was composed by Adithyan, with lyrics written by Piraisoodan.

Song	Singer(s)	Duration
"Paadu Paadu"	Swarnalatha	4:30
"Saridhana"	Chinni Jayanth	3:42
"Pachai Nellu"	Sujatha Mohan	4:35
"Mugamtheriya Mugavareeya"	Sunanda, Chinni Jayanth	4:02
"Ammadi Athadi"	P. Jayachandran	4:00
