= Solla Thudikuthu Manasu =

- DVD cover
- Directed by: B. Lenin
- Screenplay by: B. Lenin; Soma Sundareshwar
- Story by: Prathap K. Pothan
- Produced by: J. Ravi
- Starring: Karthik; Priyasri
- Cinematography: B. Kannan
- Edited by: V. T. Vijayan
- Music by: Ilaiyaraaja
- Production company: Maruthi Movie Arts
- Release date: 19 February 1988
- Running time: 130 minutes
- Country: India
- Language: Tamil

Solla Thudikuthu Manasu (transl. My heart is yearning to say this) is a 1988 Indian Tamil language romance film, directed by B. Lenin, starring Karthik and newcomer Priyasri. The film was released on 19 February 1988.

== Plot ==
Thillainathan, a young graduate, leaves his village for an interview. He gets the job at a bank, then finds a place to live and falls in love with Jeyakodi. His favourite singer, his favourite poet and his favourite politician all come, one by one, to see him in his new house. Thillainathan is amazed by the words of his mentor's about somebody named Thenmozhi. So he decides to find this unknown woman: Thenmozhi. With his sidekick, he tries to find her, but they cannot find her.

At his pre-marriage ceremony, his detective friend says that he has found Thenmozhi; so he goes there to see her. But it isn't her and he is attacked by some goons. His wedding is then cancelled, he is fired from his job at the bank, and is also expelled from his house. He finds evidence at his house that suggests that Thenmozhi is in fact Jeyakodi. He goes to her house and her office but she isn't to be found anywhere. Thillainathan returns to his village but his father doesn't consider him his son any more. Pichamuthu, his friend whose wife had eloped, is dead, and his wife's new husband helps Thillainathan find a job.

Thillainathan gets a new job. He later goes to a musical show, where he sees Jeyakodi dancing with the famous singer Vasudevan. When he talks to her after the show, she tells him that she is not Jeyakodi and that she is married to Vasudevan. Thillainathan attempts to commit suicide. At the hospital, Vasudevan confirms that she is in fact Thenmozhi. The doctor asks Vasudevan to find a person who had AB+ blood group in order to save Thillainathan. Jeyakodi offers to give her blood but refuses when she finds out that the patient is her ex-lover. At this moment Thenmozhi makes an entrance. They are all shocked to see the remarkable resemblance between Jeyakodi and Thenmozhi. Jeyakodi gives blood to her ex-lover and saves him. She and Thillainathan finally decide to get married.

== Cast ==
- Karthik as P. G. Thillainathan
- Priyasri as Jeyakodi / Thenmozhi
- Charle as Ramankutty
- Dilip as Pichamuthu
- Malaysia Vasudevan as Sivashankar
- Vennira Aadai Moorthy as Keesan
- Radha Ravi as Vasudevan
- C. R. Parthiban as Khan
- T. S. Raghavendra
- Bindu Ghosh

== Production ==
The film's story was Pratap Pothan while the screenplay and dialogues were by Soma Sundareshwar.

== Soundtrack ==
The music was composed by Ilaiyaraaja. The song "Poove Sempoove" is set in the Carnatic raga known as Gourimanohari, while "Then Mozhi" is set in Bageshri. The flute portions in "Poove Sempoove" were performed by Arunmozhi.

Song	Singer(s)	Lyrics	Duration
"Kuyilukoru"	Malaysia Vasudevan	Ponnadiyan	4:36
"Enathu Vizhi"	Jayachandran, S. Janaki	Gangai Amaran	4:27
"Poove Sempoove" (male)	K. J. Yesudas	Vaalee	5:23
"Poove Sempoove" (female)	Sunanda	Vaalee	5:37
"Then Mozhi"	Mano	Na. Kamarasan	5:15
"Vayakatti Vayathakatti"	Ilaiyaraaja	Mu. Metha	4:35
