= Seevalaperi Pandi =

- Poster
- Directed by: Pratap Pothen
- Screenplay by: K. Rajeshwar
- Story by: Sowba
- Produced by: P G Srikanth
- Starring: Napoleon; Saranya; Ahana
- Cinematography: Aravind Kamalanathan
- Edited by: B Lenin; V T Vijayan
- Music by: Adithyan
- Production company: Radhi Films
- Release date: 24 June 1994
- Running time: 145 minutes
- Country: India
- Language: Tamil

Seevalaperi Pandi is a 1994 Indian Tamil-language biographical crime action film directed by Pratap Pothen and written by K. Rajeshwar. It is based on the life of the Indian criminal of the same name. The film was released on 24 June 1994, and its success was a turning point in the lead actor Napoleon's career.

== Plot ==
'Seevalaperi' Pandi, a brave man is married to Velammal. They both live with his mother, and his elder brother Malayandi. The village leader, Grams, impressed by Pandi's strength, hires him as his bodyguard.

Grams is a good man, but he ruined the lives of some villagers because of his wrong judgments. Nayanar, Sivankalai, Karuppaiah, Mookaiah, and Oochandi were against Grams's decisions that affected the villagers. Together with the help of Pandi, they plot to kill Grams. Pandi and his associates kill Grams, but they immediately surrender. At the trial, Pandi's associates are free to go, while Pandi receives a death sentence. While Pandi waits for his death, his associates promise him that they will help his family.

At the last-minute, Pandi receives a reprieve. His sentence is life imprisonment. Pandi lives in jail, hoping his co-killers have helped his family as promised. His brother and wife reveal that his mother had died due to lack of food. Nayanar has not helped his family out with money or food as promised. He also updates Pandi that they treat him with no respect at all and instead used to abuse his family.

Pandi escapes from jail the very night and decides to take revenge on his former associates. Pandi visits Nayanar seeking vengeance. Nayanar has a different story, fooling Pandi to turn him against his brother. Once Pandi has left, Nayanar informs police of Pandi's escape. Pandi, now hunted by the police, decides to take revenge on his former associates.

On this journey, he steals from the rich who earned their money and helps the poor. Very soon, he becomes a local hooded warrior, and people show support towards him. This troubles the police, and a special sub-inspector gets the case. The sub-inspector enters the village people in disguise to arrest Pandi, but the locals do not help him.

Pandi now lives under the name Konar and assists another village head Ravi (Nizhalgal Ravi). Ravi is unaware that he is Pandi in disguise. One fateful night, Pandi fights with his wife. Pandi decides to surrender, but police catch him before he can do so.

At the station, high-ranked officials decide to kill Pandi. They expect that the locals will favour Pandi in court cases and not get a conviction. The police decide to escort Pandi to a dark and deserted place to shoot him. This way they can avoid the complicated situation and deliver their justice. The sub-inspector warns Pandi of the officials' plot to kill him. Pandi refuses to escape. Pandi's final words were to treat all men equal and remove caste-based differences.

== Cast ==
- Napoleon as Pandi
- Saranya as Velammal
- Ahana as Oyila
- Chandrasekhar as Aliyan
- Nizhalgal Ravi as Ravi Muthaliyar
- Vijayachander as Grams
- R. P. Viswam as Nayanar
- Alex as Sivankalai
- Suryakanth as Karuppaiah
- Vennira Aadai Moorthy as Mookaiah
- Prasanna Kumar as Oochandi
- Charle
- Chinni Jayanth
- Nellai Siva
- G. D. Ramesh as Rajkumar
- Madhan Gabriel as Pandi's brother
- Rangammal as Pandi's mother
- Idichapuli Selvaraj as Astrologer
- Sathyapriya as Grams' wife
- Master Dinesh as Arumugam
- Baboos as Muruga
- Silk Smitha as an item number
- John Babu in a special appearance

== Production ==
Rajeshwar went to Tirunelveli and stayed in the city to gather material for the film. He interacted with the locals for over three months. Though the film was based on the life of a person of the same name, several scenes were fictional. Rajeshwar stated: "The characters and incidents are embellished to make the movie more interesting". The film was primarily based on a novel written by Sowba that was serialised in a Tamil magazine. Pratap initially wanted Mammootty in the title role, but he declined due to unavailability of dates. Boys Rajan made his debut playing the role of a police inspector.

== Soundtrack ==
The soundtrack was composed by Adithyan.

"Oyila Paadum Paatule" was programmed by Harris Jayaraj

Song	Singer(s)	Lyrics	Length
"Aruvi Onnu Kulikudhu"	Swarnalatha	Vairamuthu	4:05
"Kelakku Sevakaiyile"	Rajagopal, Sujatha Mohan, P. G. Srikanth	K. Rajeshwar	3:45
"Masala Araikura"	Mano, Asha Latha	Vairamuthu	4:54
"Oyila Paadum Paatule"	K. S. Chithra	Vairamuthu	6:13
"Thirunvelli Seemayile"	S. P. Balasubrahmanyam	Vairamuthu	5:00

== Reception ==
The Indian Express wrote that life story of Pandi "has been brought alive on the screen by deft handling by Prathap Pothen and a very inspired performance by Napolean". The film became a box-office hit and a turning point in Napoleon's career.
