= Alex (actor) =

Indian actor and magician

Kalaimamani Alex
- Born: A. Alexander; 1959; India
- Died: 1 May 2011 (aged 51–52); Chennai, Tamil Nadu, India
- Occupations: Actor, Magician
- Years active: 1993–2011
- Spouse: Draviya Mary
- Children: Princy Raja & Tina Jerald (Daughters)
- Awards: Kalaimamani Award (2006)

A. Alexander alias Alex (1959 – 1 May 2011) was an Indian actor and magician. He appeared in over 100 Tamil films after making his debut in Rajinikanth's production Valli (1993) and won awards for his portrayal of characters in Mitta Miraasu and Kovilpatti Veeralakshmi.

== Personal life ==
A. Alexander was born in 1959 to his parents Adaikkalam and Sellakkannu Ammal.He was devout Catholic Christian.He studied at Ponnaiya Higher Secondary School in Trichy.He was married to Diraviya Mary with whom he had two daughters,Princy Raja and Tina Jerald.

== Career ==
Alex was versatile, along with his career as a film actor and he was also performing Magic arts.He was in The Guinness Book of World Records and the Limca Book of Records for performing magic non-stop for 24 hours.He worked as an office-bearer of the South Indian Film Artistes' Association.

== Death ==
He died at a private hospital in Chennai on 1 May 2011 following a brief illness aged 52.

== Awards ==
=== Tamil Nadu State Film Awards ===
The Tamil Nadu State Film Awards are the most important awards given for Tamil films. They are given annually by the Government of Tamil Nadu. The winners are selected by a jury headed by a chairman.

Year	Film	Category	Outcome	Ref.
2001	Mitta Miraasu	Tamil Nadu State Film Award for Best Villain	Won	
2003	Kovilpatti Veeralakshmi	Tamil Nadu State Film Award for Best Character Artiste (Male)	Won	

=== Honours ===
- 2006: Received title of Kalaimamani Award by the Government of Tamil Nadu, which is the highest state honour in the field of Arts
- 2010: Awarded as esteemed Knight / Chevalier title of the Gold Medal Empire of Grand Gothica / Sovereign Dynastic Imperial Religious Order of Gothia.

== Filmography ==
Year	Film	Role	Notes
1993	Valli	Wrestler	
1994	Seevalaperi Pandi	Sivankalai	
1994	Aranmanai Kaavalan		Uncredited role
1994	Thamarai	Parisal	
1995	Avatharam		
1995	Maa Manithan		
1996	Kizhakku Mugam	Kannapan	
1996	Musthaffaa		
1996	Summa Irunga Machan		
1996	En Aasai Thangachi		
1996	Andha Naal	Bar owner	
1996	Thuraimugam	Ethiraj	
1997	Pasamulla Pandiyare		
1997	Thadayam		
1998	Sundara Pandian		
1998	Guru Paarvai		
1998	Bhagavath Singh		
1998	Sivappu Nila	Maruthu	
1998	Kumbakonam Gopalu	Kannappan Nadar	
1999	Kudumba Sangili		
1999	Poomaname Vaa		
1999	Mr. Kokila		Kannada film
2000	Thirunelveli	Aranmanai	
2000	Athey Manithan	Appusamy	
2000	Kadhal Rojavae		
2001	Super Kudumbam		
2001	Ponnana Neram		
2001	Krishna Krishna		
2001	Mitta Miraasu	Masilamani	Tamil Nadu State Film Award for Best Villain
2001	Seerivarum Kaalai		
2001	Thaalikaatha Kaaliamman	Nattamai	
2002	Enge Enadhu Kavithai		
2002	Andipatti Arasampatti	Walter Pichamuthu	
2002	I Love You Da	Inspector Pandiyan	
2003	Ilasu Pudhusu Ravusu	PT Master	
2003	Kovilpatti Veeralakshmi		Tamil Nadu State Film Award for Best Male Character Artiste
2004	En Purushan Ethir Veetu Ponnu	Manikkam	
2004	Mahanadigan	Pollachiyar	
2005	Mannin Maindhan	Kasi	
2005	Padhavi Paduthum Paadu		
2006	Thalaimagan		
2007	Adavadi		
2007	Kodaikanal	Police inspector	
2008	Pazhani	Arivu	
2008	Nenjathai Killadhe	Waiter	
2008	Vasool	Geetha's father	
2009	Aadhavan	Vasudevan	
2009	Jaganmohini		
2009	Kanthaswamy	Pichumani	
2010	Sivappu Mazhai	Mukundan	
2010	Kutti Pisasu	Horserider	
2010	Pollachi Mappillai	Virudhagiri	
2010	Baana Kaathadi	Councillor	
2010	Agam Puram	Thiru's uncle	
2011	Ilaignan		
2011	Sattapadi Kutram	Politician	
2011	Karungali		
2011	Singam Puli	Bujji Babu's uncle	
2011	Gurusamy	Ayyappan devotee	Posthumous release
2012	Aathi Narayana	Roadside shop owner	Posthumous release
2017	Unnai Thottu Kolla Vaa	Priest	Posthumous release
2023	Moondram Pournami		Posthumous release
