= Ishti =

An ishti in Hinduism is a series of oblations to different deities. It also refers to a human on earth believed to have superpowers. some books state that she will change the world when she turns 21
