= Vennira Aadai Moorthy =

Indian actor (born 1936)

- Born: Krishnamoorthy Nataraja Sastri; 25 July 1936 (age 90); Komaratchi block, Chidambaram, Madras Presidency, British India
- Occupations: Actor, comedian
- Years active: 1965–2018
- Spouse: Manimala (m.1966)
- Children: 1

Krishnamoorthy Nataraja Sastri, better known by his stage name Vennira Aadai Moorthy (born 25 July 1936), is an Indian actor and comedian in Tamil cinema. He has starred in many Tamil films and television serials as a comedian and also played supporting roles. He is a lawyer by education, and holds a B.L. degree in addition to a PhD in astrology. He is married to actress Manimala. He is also a script-writer and wrote he script for Maalai Sooda Vaa, Kamal Haasan's first full-fledged film as hero.

He is remembered for his Sunday TV Show Meendum Meendum Sirippu, which aired on Sun TV for 11 years. The show had a comical take on common household themes involving slapstick and wordplay, usually ending with a social message. Moorthy wrote much of the material himself, in addition to starring on the show. He has also written 11 books, of which one is in English and 10 in Tamil, including Super Market, Jokes Dairy, and Nambamudiyadha Nambikkaigal.

== Early life ==
Moorthy was born on 25 July 1936 in British India. He is the youngest of seven children of Parents Chidambaram K. R. Nataraja Sastri, Thiruvaduthurai Sivakami The Father a criminal lawyer. He sought to follow in his father's footsteps and studied law, but ultimately never became a lawyer. After completing his BL, he obtained employment as a sales representative of Remington Rand. Moorthy left the job because it involved excess touring, and struggled to find a new job. He had a brief stint at AMJain college, Meenambakkam Chennai as tutor in department of English. He taught Shakespeare's plays in 1959–1960.

== Career ==
After leaving Remington Rand, Moorthy met his friend Chakravarthy, an associate of filmmaker C. V. Sridhar, and told him about his desire to act. Chakravarthy, who had previously seen Moorthy act on stage, told Sridhar about him, and Moorthy made his film debut in Vennira Aadai (1965). It was after the success of this film that he came to be known as Vennira Aadai Moorthy.

== Filmography ==
=== Tamil films ===
- Vennira Aadai (1965)
- Thenmazhai (1966)
- Kadhal Paduthum Paadu
- Anjal Petti 520 (1969)
- Sivantha Mann
- Naangu Killadigal
- Irulum Oliyum (1971)
- Muhammad bin Tughluq
- Uttharavindri Ulle Vaa
- Kasethan Kadavulada (1972)
- Ponvandu (1973)
- Pookkari
- Engamma Sapatham (1974)
- Athaiya Mamiya
- Paatha Poojai
- Maalai Sooda Vaa (1975; also writer)
- Anbe Aaruyire
- Annakili (1976)
- Vazhvu En Pakkam
- Kalamadi Kalam (1977)
- Gayathri
- Chittu Kuruvi
- Mullum Malarum
- Sakka Podu Podu Raja
- Kuppathu Raja (1979)
- Enippadigal
- Azhiyatha Kolangal
- Jamboo (1980)
- Ullasa Paravaigal
- Neerottam
- Kannil Theriyum Kathaikal
- Bala Nagamma (1981)
- Kanni Theevu
- Nandu
- Panneer Pushpangal
- Sivappu Malli
- Sankarlal
- Kaathula Poo
- Keezh Vaanam Sivakkum
- Raja Enga Raja (1982)
- Deviyin Thiruvilaiyadal
- Thaniyatha Thagam
- Azhagiya Kanne
- Thanikattu Raja
- Sangili
- Theerpugal Thiruththapadalam
- Theeratha Vilaiyattu Pillai
- Nadamadum Silaigal
- Iniyavale Vaa
- Paritchaikku Neramaachu
- Nizhal Thedum Nenjangal
- Silk Silk Silk (1983)
- Uruvangal Maralam
- Nenjamellam Neeye
- Sivappu Sooriyan
- Dowry Kalyanam
- Ilamai Kaalangal
- Antha Sila Naatkal
- Uyirullavarai Usha
- Thambathigal
- Saatchi
- Thandikkappatta Niyayangal
- Manaivi Solle Manthiram
- Thangaikkor Geetham
- Madurai Sooran (1984)
- Theerpu En Kaiyil
- Kathula Poo
- Vetri
- Vengaiyin Maindhan
- Maaman Machaan
- Veetuku Oru Kannagi
- Sanga Natham
- Sankari
- Iru Medhaigal
- Kudumbam
- Nalla Thambi (1985)
- Kanni Rasi
- Pudhu Yugam
- Navagraha Nayagi
- Raman Sreeraman
- Naan Sigappu Manithan
- Irandu Manam
- Veettukkari
- Engal Kural
- Urimai
- Sri Raghavendra
- Unakkaga Oru Roja
- Raja Rishi
- Neethiyin Marupakkam
- Samaya Purathale Satchi
- Paadum Vaanampaadi
- Anandha Kanneer (1986)
- Kulirkaala Megangal
- Cinema Cinema
- Muthal Vasantham
- Manithanin Marupakkam
- Mythili Ennai Kaathali
- Paaru Paaru Pattinam Paaru
- Oru Iniya Udhayam
- Sirai Paravai (1987)
- Paadu Nilave
- Anand
- Jallikattu
- Enga Ooru Pattukaran
- Enga Veetu Ramayanam
- Kalyana Kacheri
- Theertha Karaiyinile
- Mupperum Deviyar
- Chellakutti
- Shenbagamae Shenbagamae (1988)
- Manamagale Vaa
- Annanagar Mudhal Theru (1988)
- Kaalaiyum Neeye Maalaiyum Neeye
- Sakkarai Panthal
- Solla Thudikuthu Manasu
- Therkathi Kallan
- Rendum Rendum Anju
- Paatti Sollai Thattathe
- Soora Samhaaram
- En Purushanthaan Enakku Mattumthaan (1989)
- Sattathin Thirappu Vizhaa
- Thangamani Rangamani
- Pudhea Paadhai
- Avathellam Pennalae
- Moodu Manthiram
- Dharma Devan
- Thangamana Purushan
- Thangamani Rangamani
- Annanukku Jai
- Kai Veesamma Kai Veesu
- Poruthathu Pothum
- Raaja Raajathan
- Sattathin Marupakkam
- Kavalukku Kettikaran (1990)
- Idhaya Thamarai
- Kavalukku Kettikaran
- Aadi Velli
- Salem Vishnu
- Vedikkai En Vadikkai
- Nila Pennae
- Engitta Mothathay
- Mallu Vetti Minor
- En Kadhal Kanmani
- Michael Madana Kama Rajan
- Nadigan
- Ethir Kaatru
- Michael Madhana Kamarajan
- Vaaliba Viliyattu
- Aatha Naan Pass Ayittaen
- Eeramana Rojave (1991)
- Thangamana Thangachi
- Nanbargal
- Sendhoora Devi
- Shanti Enathu Shanti
- Pondatti Pondattithan
- Veetla Ezhi Velila Puli
- Kizhakku Karai
- Moondrezhuthil En Moochirukkum
- Kurumbukkaran
- Thayamma
- Idhu Namma Bhoomi
- Rickshaw Mama (1992)
- Senbaga Thottam
- Thangarasu
- Singaravelan
- Sevagan
- Brahmachari
- Annan Ennada Thambi Ennada
- Sathiyam Adhu Nichayam
- Meera
- Mutrugai (1993)
- Sinna Mapplai
- Maamiyar Veedu
- Pettredutha Pillai
- Minmini Poochigal
- Prathap
- Ulle Veliye
- Rajadhi Raja Raja Kulothunga Raja Marthanda Raja Gambeera Kathavaraya Krishna Kamarajan
- Pass Mark
- Athma
- Poranthalum Aambalaya Porakka Kudathu
- Pondatti Pondattithan
- Maravan
- Karuppu Vellai
- Karpagam Vanthachu
- Enga Muthalali
- Paarambariyam
- Sabash Babu
- Oru Vasantha Geetham (1994)
- Mogamul
- Kaviyam
- Vaanga Partner Vaanga
- Chinna Pulla
- Sevvanthi
- Sathyavan
- Sevatha Ponnu
- En Rajangam
- Priyanka
- Pathavi Pramanam
- Pondattiye Deivam
- Killadi Mappillai
- Manasu Rendum Pudhusu
- Atha Maga Rathiname
- Mappillai Manasu Poopola
- Vaa Magale Vaa
- Aval Pottakolam (1995)
- Valli Vara Pora
- Manathile Oru Paattu
- Raja Enga Raja
- Aanazhagan
- Thai Thangai Paasam
- Mogamul
- Avatharam
- Rajavin Parvaiyile
- Nadodi Mannan
- Santhaikku Vanthakkili
- Udhavum Karangal
- Neela Kuyil
- Varraar Sandiyar
- Love Birds (1996)
- Irattai Roja
- Mappillai Manasu Poopola
- Kaalam Maari Pochu
- Enakkoru Magan Pirappan
- Tata Birla
- Andha Naal
- Mr. Romeo
- Gopala Gopala
- Purushan Pondatti
- Kaalamellam Kadhal Vaazhga (1997)
- Nalla Manasukkaran
- Thaali Pudhusu
- Pongalo Pongal
- Kalyana Vaibhogam
- Thedinen Vanthathu
- Periya Manushan
- Veerapandi Kottayiley
- Color Kanavugal (1998)
- Ponnu Velayira Bhoomi
- Rathna
- Aval Varuvala
- Golmaal
- Poonthottam
- Thayin Manikodi
- Ellame En Pondattithaan
- Ponmaanai Thedi
- Sivappu Nila
- Adutha Kattam (1999)
- Mugam
- Pudhu Kudithanam
- Thirupathi Ezhumalai Venkatesa
- Thai Poranthachu (2000)
- Athey Manithan
- Kandha Kadamba Kathir Vela
- Magalirkkaga
- Nageswari (2001)
- Thaalikaatha Kaaliamman
- Sigamani Ramamani
- Sonnal Thaan Kaadhala
- Krishna Krishna
- Kunguma Pottu Gounder
- Viswanathan Ramamoorthy
- Vedham
- Chocolate
- Kottai Mariamman
- Gounder Veetu Maapillai (2002)
- Karpooranayagi
- Ezhumalai
- Shree
- I Love You Da
- Annai Kaligambal (2003)
- Ramachandra
- Yes Madam
- Well Done
- Saamy
- Parasuram
- Jayam
- Galatta Ganapathy
- Anbe Un Vasam
- Alai
- Jairam (2004)
- Madhurey
- M. Kumaran Son Of Mahalakshmi
- Kadhale Jayam
- Veeranna (2005)
- Prathi Gnayiru 9 Manimudhal 10.30 Varai
- Kaatrullavarai
- Ponniyin Selvan
- Alaiyadikkuthu
- Vanakkam Thalaiva
- Madrasi (2006)
- Imsai Arasan 23rd Pulikecei
- Kaivantha Kalai
- Kurukshetram
- Vathiyar
- Kumaran
- Madhurai Veeran (2007)
- 18 Vayasu Puyale
- Yaaruku Yaaro
- Thavam
- Dindigul Sarathy (2008)
- Unnai Naan
- Durai
- Jaganmohini (2009)
- Anthony Yaar
- Sivagiri
- Oru Kadhalan Oru Kadhali
- Tamizh Padam (2010)
- Rasikkum Seemane
- Sura
- Pournami Nagam
- Ochayee
- Vallakottai
- Pasakkara Nanbargal (2011)
- Sagakkal
- Vaaliban Sutrum Ulagam
- Thambi Vettothi Sundaram
- Maharaja
- Manam Kothi Paravai (2012)
- Summa Nachunu Irukku (2013)
- Arya Surya
- Pani Vizhum Nilavu (2014)
- Killadi (2015)
- Sandamarutham
- Rombha Nallavan Da Nee
- Vasuvum Saravananum Onna Padichavanga (2015)
- Itly (2018)

=== Other language films ===
Telugu

- Bandhuvulostunnaru Jagratha (1989)
- Ganga (1991)
- Prema Thapassu (1991)
- Thammudu (1999)

Hindi

- Khajuraho (2002)

Malayalam

- Kochi Rajavu (2005)

=== Television ===
Year	Name of Television Show	Role	Network
2015	Meendum Meendum Sirippu		Sun TV
2024	Super Singer Season 10	Guest	Star Vijay
