= Piraisoodan =

Indian poet and lyricist (1956–2021)

Piraisoodan (born as Chandrasekar)
- Born: February 6, 1956; Nannilam, Tiruvarur district, Tamil Nadu, India
- Died: 8 October 2021 (aged 65)
- Occupations: actor, poet, dialogue writer
- Years active: 1980-2021
- Awards: Kalaimamani Award (1999)

Piraisoodan (6 February 1956 – 8 October 2021) was a Tamil poet and lyricist.

He won the Tamil Nadu State Film Award for Best Lyricist for his songs in movies like Thayagam, En Rasavin Manasile and Neeyum Naanum in 1996, 1991 and 2010 respectively. He was a director in IPRS (Indian Performing Rights Society) and was holding many key posts including secretary of SWAN (South Indian Writers Association). He wrote ‘Jagam Pughazum’, a Carnatic song that sums up the life of Thyagaraja.

He was conferred the title "Kavi Gnaani" by the late music director M.S.Viswanathan. He is notable for his eloquent literary speeches and for his ability to complete a song in few minutes. In a television reality program called "Vanampadi" he explained the meaning and intricate nuances of various Tamil film songs that won him accolades and place him as the best analyser and critic for Tamil film songs.

He was conferred a Doctorate in literature by the University Of Jerusalem.

== Personal life ==
Piraisoodan was born and brought up in Nannilam, a small panchayat town in Tiruvarur district in Tamil Nadu. Originally named Chandrasekhar, he took the pseudonym as a Tamil translation of his name. Piraisoodan has nine siblings - seven brothers and two sisters. One of them is R. Madhi, a cinematographer who also works in the Tamil film industry. Piraisoodan has a daughter and son Dhayanandh Piraisoodan, a music director who also works in the film industry. He made his debut as lyricist with Sirai (1985).

== Death ==
He died on 8 October 2021 at the age of 65 due to heart attack.

== Partial filmography ==
=== Lyricist ===
==== Films ====
Year	Film	Songs	Notes
2017	Jayikkira Kudhira	Veetukkoru Saamiyundu	
2016	Aranmanai 2	Amma (The Amman song)	
2014	Aranmanai	Unnaye Nambiye	
2013	Masani	Masani	
2013	Ullamellam Talladuthe	Ullamellam Talladuthe	
2013	Chandramouli	Dharmam Vazha & Nallavan Endrum	
2013	Arya Surya	Star Star	
2012	Nachiyarpuram	Nachiyarpuram	
2011	Sri Rama Rajyam	All Songs and Dialogues	
2011	Om Sakthi	Jolly Aa Jolly Aa, Pongum Kanalai & Yemana Kolluthu	
2009	Enga Raasi Nalla Raasi	Vaaya Vaaya	
2009	Thee	Theepporiyil	
2008	Marudhani		
2008	Kodaikanal	All Songs except 'Mettu Mettu'	
2007	Piragu	Aasa Dosa	
2007	Cheena Thaana 001	Acha Acha	
2007	Adavadi	Idhu One Day & Dindugal Poottu	
2007	Manikanda	Madhippukuriya	
2006	Dhoom 2	All songs except "Dhoom Again"	Tamil version
2005	Aatchi	All Songs	
2005	Girivalam	Adiyae Aandaal Amma	
2005	Veeran	all songs	
2005	Iyer IPS	Hi-Tech Kangala	
2004	Manathil	Ponnu Paarthathum	
2004	Kadhal Thiruda	Thalukki Nikkara	
2004	Maha Nadigan	Alwa Nayagane	
2004	Oru Murai Sollividu	Enna Kichu Kichu	
2004	Super Da	Iduppu Madippu	
2004	Jore	Muttikkalama	
2004	Adi Thadi	Thagadu Thagadu	
2003	Vaanam Vaazhthattum	All Songs	
2003	Unnai Paartha Naal Mudhal	Engu Ullayamma & Naathirinna	
2003	Anbe Un Vasam	Thirumugam	
2002	Rudhiran	All Songs	
2002	Dance Master	All Songs	
2002	Jjunction	Poo Mugam Siricha	
2001	Star	Machaa Machiniyae	
2001	Super Kudumbam	Yenthen Selaiyum and Uyirae En Uyirai	
2001	Krishna Krishna	Aandavan Namaku	
2001	Engalukkum Kaalam Varum	Engalukkum Kalam Varum	
2000	Kurukshetram	Koila Koila and So So So Adi Sonare	
2000	Thenali	Porkalam Ange	
2000	Krodham 2	All Songs	
2000	Kandha Kadamba Kathir Vela	Thenatru Meena	Not in Film
2000	Athey Manithan	All songs except Idiyappam	
1999	Sathriya Dharmam	All Songs	
1999	Ponvizha	Adiye Annakiliye & Naadu Sezhikka	
1999	Kaadhal	All Songs	
1999	Endrendrum Kadhal	Take It Easy	
1998	Endrum Anandham	Laila Majunu	Not Released
1998	Autokaran	All Songs	
1997	Adhanda Idhanda	All Songs	Not Released
1997	Putham Puthu Poove	Rettai Jadai	Not Released
1997	Arasiyal	Varai En Thozhiyae	
1997	Thambi Durai	Aathu Mettula	
1997	Paththini	Mellathan Solla	
1997	Pagaivan	Oh My Butterfly	
1997	Adimai Changili	Kaanangatha Meenu	
1996	Krishna	Idhu Nee Irukkum Nenjamadi & Ingu Aadum Varai	
1996	Mouna Yuddham	All Songs	
1996	Puthiya Parasakthi	Kizhakku Veluchu	
1996	Thayagam	All Songs	Tamil Nadu State Film Award for Best Lyricist
1995	Chinna Ponnu Radha	All Songs	Not Released
1995	Dear Son Maruthu	Malarodu Nilavu and Poovizhi Vaasalile	
1995	Mannai Thottu Kumbidanum	Mannai Thottu Kumbidanum	
1995	Varraar Sandiyar	All songs except 'Dindukallu'	
1995	Sabash Ramu	All Songs	
1995	Asuran	Chakku Chakku Vathikuchi and O Vanmathi	
1995	Anbu Magan	Chinna Chiru	
1995	Ellame En Kadhali	All Songs	
1995	Lucky Man	All songs	
1995	Paattu Vaathiyar	Mutham Endral	
1995	Veluchami	Uyire Uyire	
1995	Karuppu Nila	Chinnavare Chinnavare and Pallakku Pallakku	
1994	Kizhakku Pakkam Kaathiru	Sevvanthi Poove	
1994	Pokkiri Kadhalan	All Songs	
1994	Galatta Maappillai	All Songs	
1994	Chinna Pulla	All songs	
1994	Pandiyanin Rajyathil	All songs except 'Raasathi Nee'	
1994	Ilaignar Ani	All songs except 'Kanni Poove Vaa'	
1994	Sevvanthi	Punnaivana Poonguyil	
1994	Pathavi Pramanam	Ore Oru Paattu and Poo Mudithu Pottu Vachu	
1993	Kaaval Thurai	Kanni Ponnu Bossu, Ku Ku Malar Inge and Neeyum Naanum	
1993	Parvathi Ennai Paradi	Kadhalil Maatamal and Kombugal Illa	
1993	Naan Pesa Ninaipathellam	Devan Kovil	
1993	Chinna Devan	Ada Editha Veettu	
1993	Aranmanai Kili	Nattu Vecha Roja and Ramera Ninaikkum	
1993	Minmini Poochigal	Kanmanikku Nenjil, Ottaga Marangal and Thithikkum Paaru	
1993	Chinna Kannamma	Chinna Chinna Poongodi	
1993	Sinna Mapplai	Vennilavu Kothipathenna	
1992	Veera Marudhu	All Songs	
1992	Pudhu Varusham	Chinna Pasanga Paattu, Manasula Manasula and Yaaradi Unpurushan	
1992	Onna Irukka Kathukanum	Kadhalunna	
1992	Mangala Nayagan	En Kanmani and Poove Ilampoove	
1992	David Uncle	Devan Sabaiyinil, Thattungadi and Vaaya Hey Soodu Yeruthu	
1992	Endrum Anbudan	Manjal Veyil	
1992	Naalaya Seidhi	Manthiram Sonnathu	
1992	Nadodi Pattukkaran	Vaanga Vaanga	
1992	Unna Nenachen Pattu Padichen	Ennai Thottu and Kanna Un Kannil	
1992	Chembaruthi	Nadandhal Irandadi, Ada Vanjiram and Kadile Thanimayile	
1992	Thanga Manasukkaran	Manikuyil Isaikkuthadi and Maaney Mayanguvatheno	
1992	Unnai Vaazhthi Paadugiren	Oru Raagam	
1992	Kaaval Geetham	Sokkanukku Vaacha	
1992	Pandithurai	Ennai Paarthu and Malaiyitta Ponnu	
1992	Ilavarasan	Yaaro Neeyaaro	
1992	Amaran	Vethala Potta, Tring Tring, Vasanthame Arugil Vaa, Paanja Janiyam and Abhyam Krishna	
1991	Anbulla Thangachikku	Manja Thanni	
1991	Nenjamundu Nermaiundu	Rajave Chinna Rajave	
1991	En Pottukku Sonthakkaran	Manasonnu Thudikkuthu	
1991	Manasara Vazhthungalen	Nee Sonadhu	
1991	Oorellam Un Paattu	Thom Thom	
1991	Idhayam	Idhayamae Idhayamae	
1991	Captain Prabhakaran	Aattama Therottama	
1991	En Rasavin Manasile	Sola Pasunkiliye	Tamil Nadu State Film Award for Best Lyricist
1991	Gopura Vasalile	Kadhal Kavithaigal, Keladi En and Naatham	
1991	Perum Pulli	Aanum Pennum and Mambala Thota	
1991	Eeramana Rojave	Kalakalakum Maniosai	
1990	Nee Sirithaal Deepavali	Sayangala Sandhya	
1990	Raja Kaiya Vacha	Kadhalukku Raja	
1990	Vellaiya Thevan	Nall Isai Thattu	
1990	Mallu Vetti Minor	Adi Matthalam	
1990	Amman Kovil Thiruvizha	Madhura Oyilattam	
1990	My Dear Marthandan	Oh Azhagu Nilavu	
1990	Keladi Kanmani	Thendral Thaan	
1990	Sirayil Pootha Chinna Malar	Ethanai Per Unnai Nambi	
1990	Athisaya Piravi	Thanananthan	
1990	Periya Veetu Pannakkaran	Summa Nee	
1990	Maruthu Pandi	Adhamum Yevalum	
1990	Pondatti Thevai	Amma Naan	
1990	Arangetra Velai	Gundu Onnu	
1990	Panakkaran	Silence Idhu Kadhal	
1990	Nalla Kaalam Porandaachu	Paattu Oru Paattu and Kelamma Unathu Vithai	
1989	Vaathiyaar Veettu Pillai	Chikkunu Irukku	
1989	Mappillai	Veru Velai Unakku	
1989	Anbu Kattalai	Oru Koottin Kiligal	
1989	Kai Veesamma Kai Veesu	Nal Anbedhan	
1989	Ninaivu Chinnam	Oorellam Thoonguthu	
1989	Padicha Pulla	Poongatre Ini Pothum and Poongatre Ithu Pothum	
1989	Enga Ooru Mappillai	Oorukulla Vantha	
1989	Rajadhi Raja	Meenamma Meenamma	
1989	En Purushanthaan Enakku Mattumthaan	Pullai Kooda	
1989	Pongi Varum Kaveri	Indha Rasave and Mannavan Paadum	
1989	Ennai Peththa Rasa	Sontham Ondrai	
1988	Enga Ooru Kavalkaran	Jivvu Jivvu	
1988	En Bommukutty Ammavukku	Uyire Uyirin Oliye	
1988	Irandil Ondru	Naarinil Poo	
1984	Sirai	Rasathi Rosapoove	Debut Movie

==== Television ====
- 1995 Vizhuthugal
- 1995 Nila Penn
- 1999 Mangai
- 1999 Pallankuzhi
- 2000 Gopuram
- 2000 Maya Machindra
- 2003 Anandham
- 2006 Agni Pravesam
- 2008 Rekha IPS
- 2009 Avalukkendru Oru Manam
- 2010 Uyirin Niram Oodha

Dialogue writer

- 1999 Sathriya Dharmam
- 2000 Krodham 2
- 2000 Shankar
- 2011 Sri Rama Rajyam (Tamil version)

Actor

- 1992 Amaran
- 2014 Sathuranga Vettai
- 2016 Pugazh
- 2019 Enakku Innum Kalyanam Aagala
- 2021 Annaatthe

== Awards ==
- Kalaimamani Award - 1999
