= B. Lenin =

Indian film editor and director

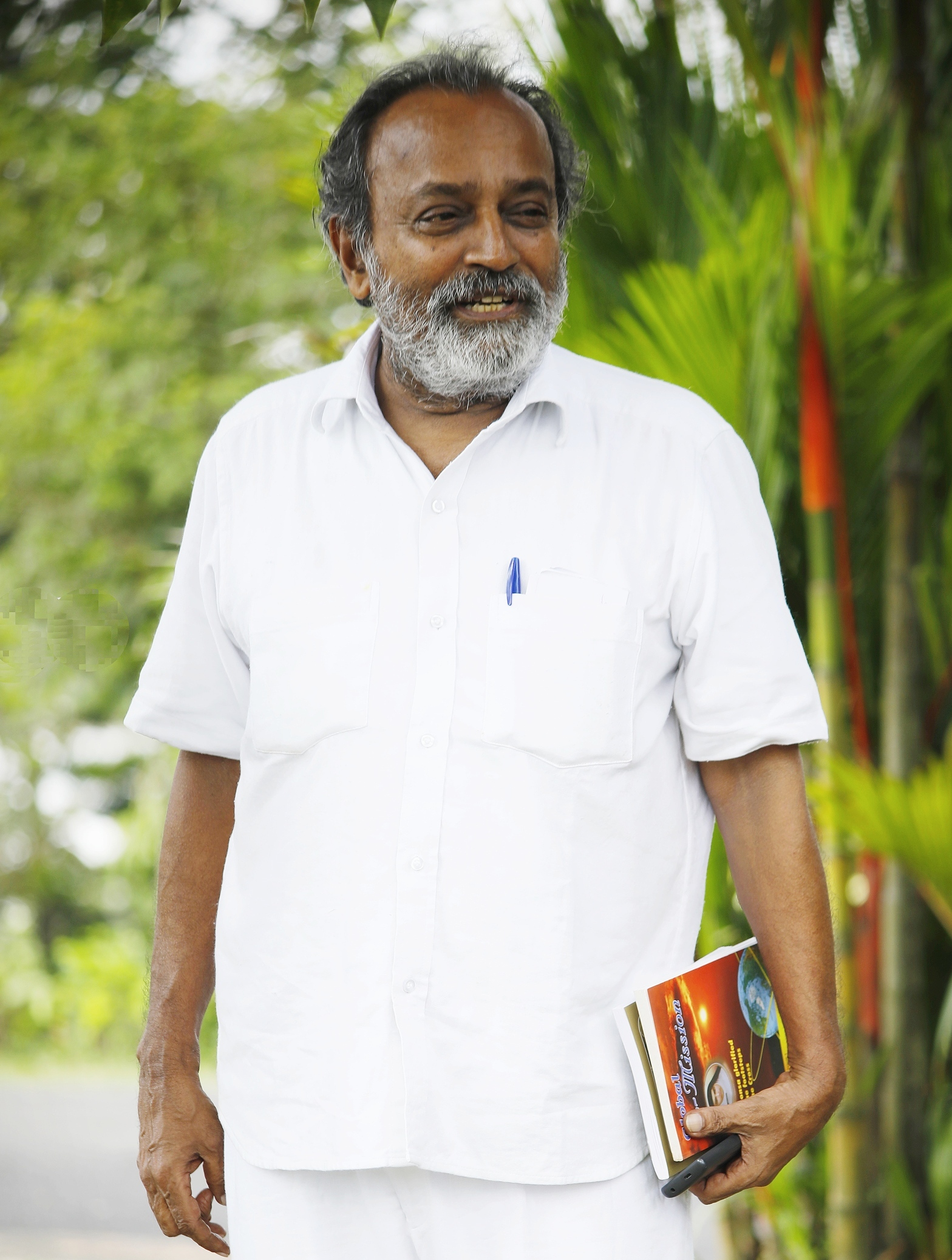
- Lenin during documentary film shoot at the Chavvara Hills, Kerala.
- Born: Bhimsingh Lenin; 15 August 1947 (age 79)
- Occupations: Film editor, director, writer
- Years active: 1966–present
- Relatives: A. Bhimsingh (father)

Bhimsingh Lenin (born 15 August 1947) is an Indian film editor, writer and director who works in Tamil, Malayalam and Hindi films. The son of Tamil film maker A. Bhimsingh, Lenin entered the film industry as an assistant editor and went on to work in numerous projects before making his debut as an independent editor with Mahendran's Uthiripookkal (1979). In the mid 1980s, Lenin started jointly working with his long-time assistant V. T. Vijayan and the duo has so far edited over a hundred films.

As of 2017, Lenin has won five National Film Awards, including the awards for Best Direction and Best Editing. He was the chairman of the Film Federation of India in 2011.

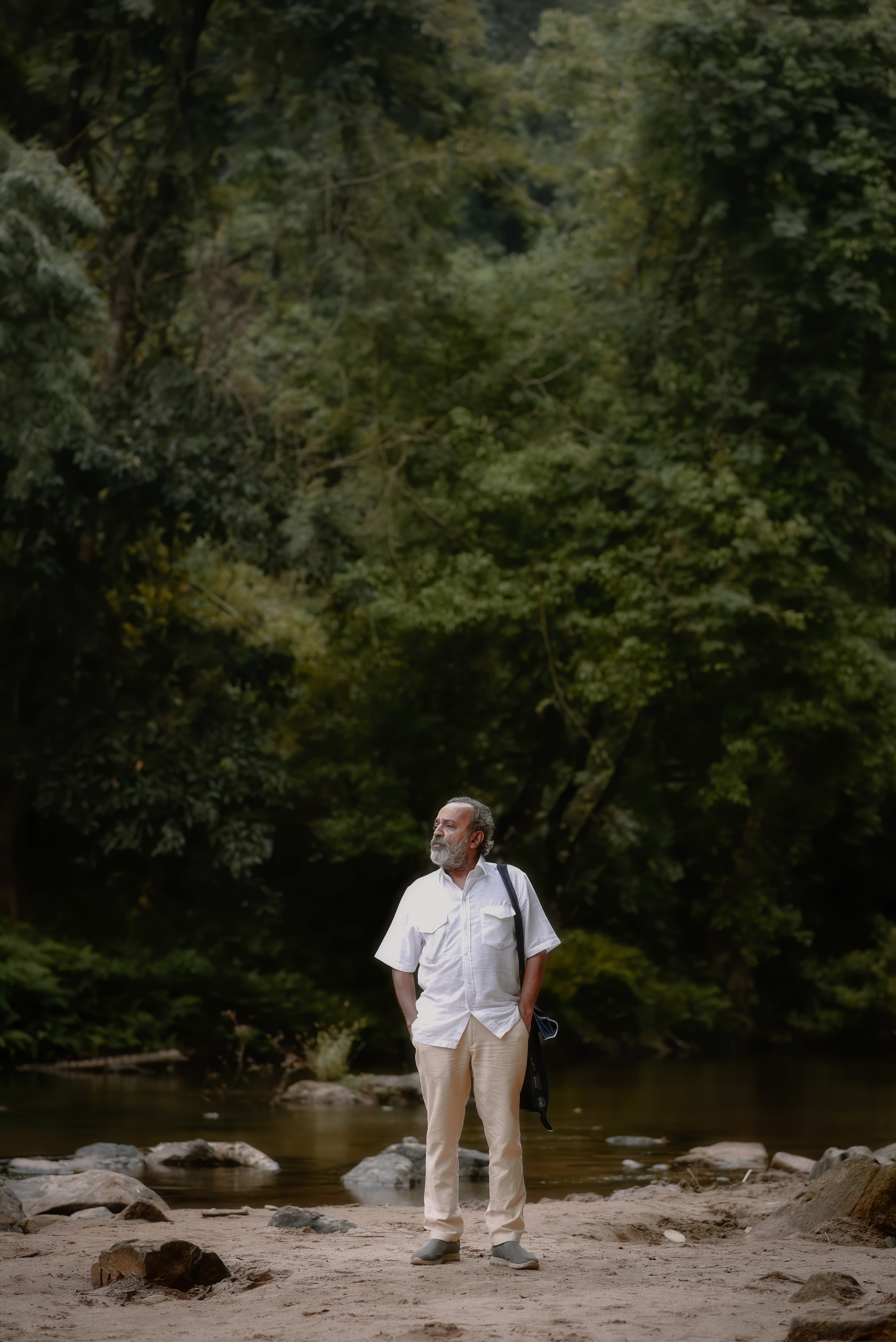
B Lenin

== Biography ==
Lenin was born in a Bondil Rajput family consisting of eight children. His father A. Bhimsingh was a well known director in Tamil and Hindi films. Lenin started his career as an associate director of his father and assisted in editing many of his films. He also had experience as a lab technician and sound engineering department as well.

After several films working as an assistant, Lenin first worked independently on Kalank, a Fiji-based production, in 1978. He made his debut as an independent editor in Indian cinema with the 1979 Tamil film Uthiripookkal which was directed by Mahendran. Although he started as an independent editor, he later associated himself with his assistant V. T. Vijayan, and the duo went on to work together in a number of films during the 80s and 90s, including Nayakan, Geethanjali, Anjali and Kaadhalan, which won them the National Film Award for Best Editing.

He made his directorial debut in 1983 with Ethanai Konam Ethanai Parvai (1983), and went on to direct four feature films and four non-feature films. His short film Knock-Out (1992) was critically acclaimed and went on to win the Islamia Critics Award for Best Short Film at the Cairo International Film Festival. It also won the National Film Award for Best First Non-Feature Film of a Director for Lenin. Three years later, he directed his second short film tilted Kutravali, which won the Best Editing at the 43rd National Film Awards. In 2002, Lenin made Ooruku Nooruper. The film won him the Best Direction award and the Best Regional Film (Tamil). The film dealt with capital punishment and was received with critical response. He has also directed a few TV serials including Solladi Sivasakthi. Lenin has held important positions such as the jury member of 57th National Film Awards (2010) and the chairman of Oscar selection committee (of FFI) in 2011. Now he is contributing heavily to the education society thorough various institutions like Pune Film Institute, Lenin now works along with a reputed film institute in Coimbatore named Clusters media college as its dean helping its students gain knowledge in real time professional movie making and guiding them through his wide experience in film industry

== Selected filmography ==
=== As editor ===
Year	Film	Language	Notes
1979	Uthiripookkal	Tamil	
1980	Poottaatha Poottukkal	Tamil	
1981	Panneer Pushpangal	Tamil	
1982	Kozhi Koovuthu	Tamil	
1982	Metti	Tamil	
1982	Azhagiya Kanney	Tamil	
1983	Pallavi Anu Pallavi	Kannada	
1983	Ethanai Konam Ethanai Parvai	Tamil	
1984	Parannu Parannu Parannu	Malayalam	
1984	Unaroo	Malayalam	
1984	Sahasame Jeevitham	Telugu	
1984	Kai Kodukkum Kai	Tamil	
1984	Pozhuthu Vidinchachu	Tamil	
1985	Meendum Oru Kaathal Kathai	Tamil	
1985	Thendrale Ennai Thodu	Tamil	
1985	Pagal Nilavu	Tamil	
1985	Idaya Kovil	Tamil	
1985	Thinkalaazhcha Nalla Divasam	Malayalam	
1986	Kariyilakkattu Pole	Malayalam	
1986	Arappatta Kettiya Gramathil	Malayalam	
1986	Kannukku Mai Ezhuthu	Tamil	
1986	Desatanakkili Karayarilla	Malayalam	
1986	Mouna Ragam	Tamil	
1986	Namukku Parkkan Munthiri Thoppukal	Malayalam	
1987	Rithubhedam	Malayalam	
1987	Nombarathi Poovu	Malayalam	
1987	Thoovanathumbikal	Malayalam	
1987	Nayakan	Tamil	
1988	Solla Thudikuthu Manasu	Tamil	
1988	Aparan	Malayalam	
1988	Andru Peytha Mazhaiyil	Tamil	
1988	Abhinandana	Telugu	
1988	Daisy	Malayalam	
1988	Moonnam Pakkam	Malayalam	
1988	August 15 Raatri	Telugu	
1989	Rajadhi Raja	Tamil	
1989	Police Report	Telugu	
1989	Geethanjali	Telugu	
1989	Ulsavapittennu	Malayalam	
1989	Innale	Malayalam	
1989	Apoorva Sagodharargal	Tamil	
1989	Vetri Vizha	Tamil	
1989	Season	Malayalam	
1990	My Dear Marthandan	Tamil	
1990	Thazhvaram	Malayalam	
1990	Anjali	Tamil	
1991	Thalattu Ketkuthamma	Tamil	
1991	Amaram	Malayalam	
1991	Thayamma	Tamil	
1991	Kadavu	Malayalam	
1991	Chaitanya	Telugu	
1991	Vasanthakala Paravai	Tamil	
1992	Singaravelan	Tamil	
1992	Suriyan	Tamil	
1992	Magudam	Tamil	
1992	Malootty	Malayalam	
1992	Nakshthrakoodaram	Malayalam	
1992	Aavarampoo	Tamil	
1992	Meera	Tamil	
1993	I Love India	Tamil	
1993	Venkalam	Malayalam	
1993	Chamayam	Malayalam	
1993	Athma	Tamil	
1993	Padheyam	Malayalam	
1993	Gentleman	Tamil	
1993	Sopanam	Tamil	
1994	Priyanka	Tamil	
1994	Seevalaperi Pandi	Tamil	
1994	May Madham	Tamil	
1994	Kaadhalan	Tamil	National Film Award for Best Editing (shared with V. T. Vijayan); Tamil Nadu State Film Award for Best Editor
1994	Vanaja Girija	Tamil	
1995	Lucky Man	Tamil	
1995	Mogamul	Tamil	
1995	Mayabazar	Tamil	
1995	Highway	Malayalam	
1995	Kutravali	Tamil	Short film National Film Award for Best Non-Feature Film Editing (also for Oodaha); Islamia critics Award for Best Short Film
1995	Oodaha	Tamil	Short film National Film Award for Best Non-Feature Film Editing (also for Kutravali)
1996	Desadanam	Malayalam	
1996	Mahaprabhu	Tamil	
1996	Sivasakthi	Tamil	
1996	Devaraagam	Malayalam	
1996	Senathipathi	Tamil	
1996	Indian	Tamil	
1996	Kadhal Desam	Tamil	
1996	Alexander	Tamil	
1997	Oru Yathramozhi	Malayalam	
1997	Guru	Malayalam	
1997	Ratchagan	Tamil	
1998	Kaadhale Nimmadhi	Tamil	
1998	Velai	Tamil	
1998	Aval Varuvala	Tamil	
1998	Kallu Kondoru Pennu	Malayalam	
1998	Jeans	Tamil	
1999	Vaalee	Tamil	
1999	Mudhalvan	Tamil	
2000	Kushi	Tamil	
2000	Pandavas: The Five Warriors	English	Also music supervisor
2001	Looty	Tamil	
2001	Kushi	Telugu	
2001	Dhill	Tamil	
2001	12B	Tamil	
2001	Nayak: The Real Hero	Hindi	
2001	Ooruku Nooruper	Tamil	
2005	Ullam Ketkume	Tamil	
2005	Thavamai Thavamirundhu	Tamil	
2006	Sasanam	Tamil	
2007	Chennai 600028	Tamil	
2007	Periyar	Tamil	
2008	Mudhal Mudhal Mudhal Varai	Tamil	
2008	Manjadikuru	Malayalam	
2008	Meipporul	Tamil	
2009	Kulir 100°	Tamil	
2010	Namma Gramam	Tamil	Tamil Nadu State Film Award for Best Editor
2011	Paal	Tamil	
2011	Help	English	short film
2011	Uchithanai Muharnthaal	Tamil	
2011	Roadside Ambanis	Tamil	Short film
2012	Suzhal	Tamil	
2012	Karuppampatti	Tamil	
2012	Kizhakku Paatha Veedu	Tamil	
2014	Ramanujan	Tamil; English	
2015	The Yellow Festival	Tamil	Short Film
2015	Appavum Veenjum	Malayalam	
2016	Edavappathy	Malayalam	
2016	Ishti	Sanskrit	
2017	Kalavaadiya Pozhuthugal	Tamil	
2021	Ainthu Unarvugal	Tamil	
2023	Karumegangal Kalaigindrana	Tamil	
2025	Kooran	Tamil	
2025	Raagu Kethu	Tamil	

=== As director ===
Year	Film	Language	Notes
1980	Nathiyai Thedi Vandha Kadal	Tamil	
1982	Pannaipurathu Pandavargal	Tamil	
1983	Ethanai Konam Ethanai Parvai	Tamil	Unreleased
1988	Solla Thudikuthu Manasu	Tamil	
1992	Knock-Out	Tamil	Short film National Film Award for Best First Non-Feature Film of a Director
2001	Ooruku Nooruper	Tamil	National Film Award for Best Direction; National Film Award for Best Feature Film in Tamil
2016	Kandadhai Sollugiren	Tamil	

=== As actor ===
Year	Film	Language	Notes
1998	Kaadhale Nimmadhi	Tamil	Cameo appearance in song "Kandhan Irukkum Idam"

=== As assistant editor ===
Year	Film	Language	Notes
1970	Gopi	Hindi	
1972	Maalik	Hindi	
1972	Bombay to Goa	Hindi	
1972	Joroo Ka Ghulam	Hindi	
1974	Do Phool	Hindi	
1974	Naya Din Nai Raat	Hindi	
1976	Sabse Bada Rupaiya	Hindi	

== Awards ==
=== National Film Awards ===
- 1992 – Knock-Out – Best First Non-Feature Film of a Director (Also producer)
- 1994 – Kaadhalan – Best Editing (shared with V. T. Vijayan)
- 1995 – Kutravali and Oodaha – Best Non-Feature Film Editing (shared with V. T. Vijayan)
- 2001 – Ooruku Nooruper – National Film Award for Best Direction
- 2001 – Ooruku Nooruper – National Film Award for Best Feature Film in Tamil

=== Tamil Nadu State Film Awards ===
- 1988 – Best Editor
- 1994 – Best Editor – Kaadhalan
- 2010 – Best Editor – Namma Gramam

=== Kerala State Film Awards ===
- 1990 – Best Editor - Thazhvaram
- 1993 – Best Editor – Sopanam

=== Vijay Awards ===
- 2006 – Vijay Awards Special Jury Award for Editing

=== Rotary Club Of Madras East ===
- 2017 -Dronacharya Award
