= Prabhu Deva filmography =

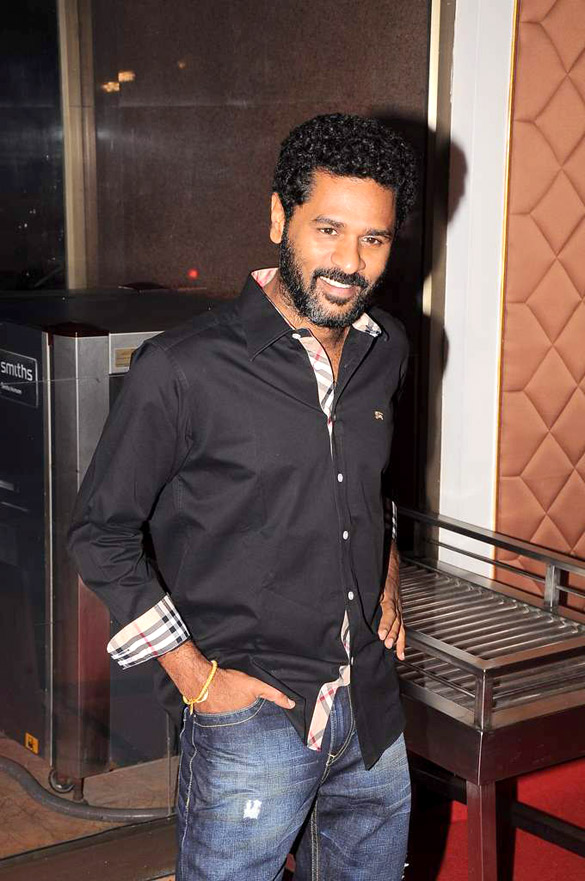
Prabhu Deva at the success party of his film Rowdy Rathore in 2012

Prabhu Deva is an Indian dance choreographer, film director, producer and actor, who has worked in Tamil, Telugu, Hindi, Malayalam and Kannada films. In a career spanning 30 years, he has performed and designed a wide range of dancing styles and has predominantly acted in Tamil films. He made his debut as a boy playing a flute in the song "Panivizhum Iravu", from the Tamil film Mouna Ragam (1986). After several appearances as a dancer, he made his debut as a lead actor in Pavithran's Indhu. He made his career breakthrough in his second film Kaadhalan (1994) directed by S. Shankar. Prabhu Deva acted as a college student who loves the daughter of state governor, who has ties with a terrorist. The film was a commercial success and critics lauded Prabhu Deva's choreography and his dance sequences in the songs "Mukkabla" and "Urvasi Urvasi", became very popular.

Prabhu Deva featured in several commercially successful films like Minsara Kanavu (1997) and VIP (1997), where for the former he went on to win the National Film Award for Best Choreography for his work in the songs "Strawberry Kannae" and "Vennilave". He was critically acclaimed for his performance in the comedy Kaathala Kaathala (1998), co-starring with Kamal Haasan. Despite the successful ventures like Eazhaiyin Sirippil (2000) and Sundar C's Ullam Kollai Poguthae (2001), Deva was unable to recreate the success he had in his earlier years and many of his films didn't perform well financially. Starting in the 2000s, Prabhu Deva played the second hero in several Telugu films, several of which were remakes of Hollywood and Malayalam films.

In the year 2005, Prabhu Deva made his debut as a director in the Telugu film Nuvvostanante Nenoddantana. The film received critical acclaim and went on to become a blockbuster. The film was remade in seven languages and it is considered as the first Indian movie to do so. The movie won 9 Filmfare awards including a Best Choreographer award for Prabhudeva. Following the success of his directorial ventures, Deva started to prioritize directing to acting. Occasionally he starred as a lead in dance films like Style (2006), ABCD (2013) and its sequel ABCD 2 (2015).

Prabhu Deva established the production company Prabhu Deva Studios and produced the film Devi, which was directed by A. L. Vijay in the year 2016. The film marked the return of Deva to Tamil cinema as an actor after a 12-year hiatus. The film was acclaimed critically and was a financial success at the box office. After the success of the film, Deva appeared in Gulaebaghavali, silent film Mercury and Lakshmi in the year 2018. In the year 2019, Deva had a line up of sequel films including Charlie Chaplin 2, a sequel to Deva's Charlie Chaplin, and Devi 2. Both the films were met with negative reviews and failed commercially.

== As a film director ==
Key
†	Denotes films that have not yet been released

List of Prabhu Deva film credits as director
Year	Film	Language	Ref.
2005	Nuvvostanante Nenoddantana	Telugu	
2006	Pournami	Telugu	
2007	Pokkiri	Tamil	
2007	Shankar Dada Zindabad	Telugu	
2009	Villu	Tamil	
2009	Wanted	Hindi	
2011	Engeyum Kaadhal	Tamil	
2011	Vedi	Tamil	
2012	Rowdy Rathore	Hindi	
2013	Ramaiya Vastavaiya	Hindi	
2013	R... Rajkumar	Hindi	
2014	Action Jackson	Hindi	
2015	Singh Is Bliing	Hindi	
2019	Dabangg 3	Hindi	
2021	Radhe	Hindi	

== As an actor ==
Key
†	Denotes films that have not yet been released

List of Prabhu Deva film credits as actor
Year	Film	Role	Language	Notes	Ref.
1986	Mouna Raagam	Flute player	Tamil	Uncredited appearance in the song "Panivizhum Iravu"	
1993	Rakshana		Telugu	Uncredited appearance in the song "Gallu Mandhi Basu"	
1994	Indhu	Chinnasamy (Pattasu)	Tamil		
1994	Kaadhalan	Prabhu	Tamil		
1995	Raasaiyya	Raasaiyya	Tamil		
1996	Love Birds	Arun / David	Tamil		
1996	Mr. Romeo	Romeo, Madras	Tamil	Dual role	
1997	Minsara Kanavu	Deva	Tamil		
1997	VIP	Guru	Tamil		
1998	Naam Iruvar Nammaku Iruvar	Prabhu / Deva	Tamil		
1998	Love Story 1999	Vamsi	Telugu		
1998	Kaathala Kaathala	Sundaralingam	Tamil		
1999	Ninaivirukkum Varai	Janakiraman (Johnny)	Tamil		
1999	Suyamvaram	Kanna	Tamil		
1999	Time	Srininvasa Murthy	Tamil		
2000	Vaanathaippola	Selvakumar	Tamil		
2000	Eazhaiyin Sirippil	Ganesan	Tamil		
2000	James Pandu	James	Tamil		
2000	Pennin Manathai Thottu	Sunil	Tamil		
2000	Doubles	Prabhu	Tamil		
2001	Nila Kaalam	Ashok	Tamil	Television film; Guest appearance	
2001	Ullam Kollai Poguthae	Anbu	Tamil		
2001	Alli Thandha Vaanam	Sathyam	Tamil		
2001	Manadhai Thirudivittai	Deva	Tamil		
2002	Charlie Chaplin	Thiru	Tamil		
2002	H_{2}O	Vairamuthu	Kannada		
2002	Santosham	Pawan	Telugu		
2002	One Two Three	Tirupathi	Tamil	25th Film	
2002	Manasella Neene	Himself	Kannada	Guest appearance	
2002	Agni Varsha	Rakshasha	Hindi		
2002	Thotti Gang	Suri Babu	Telugu		
2003	Kalyana Ramudu	Rajesh	Telugu		
2003	Alaudin	Alaudin	Tamil		
2003	Oka Radha Iddaru Krishnula Pelli	Murugan	Telugu		
2004	Engal Anna	Kannan	Tamil		
2004	Tapana	Venu	Telugu		
2004	Intlo Srimathi Veedhilo Kumari	Gopal	Telugu		
2004	Andalu Dongale Dorikithe	Bujji	Telugu		
2005	Nuvvostanante Nenoddantana	Bullock cart driver	Telugu	Special appearance in the song "Paripoke Pitta"	
2006	Style	Ganesh	Telugu		
2006	Chukkallo Chandrudu	Sharat	Telugu	Guest appearance	
2006	Naayudamma	Prabhu	Telugu		
2007	Prarambha	Puttaswamy Gowda	Kannada	Short film	
2008	Michael Madana Kamaraju	Michael / Ravi	Telugu		
2011	Urumi	Vavvali, Thanseer	Malayalam	Dual role	
2011	Engeyum Kadhal	Narrator	Tamil	Special appearance	
2013	ABCD	Vishnu	Hindi		
2014	Happy New Year	Dance instructor	Hindi	Guest appearance	
2015	ABCD 2	Vishnu	Hindi		
2015	Singh Is Bliing	Man in the washroom	Hindi	Guest appearance	
2016	Devi	Krishna Kumar	Tamil	Trilingual film; Also producer	
2016	Abhinetri	Krishna Kumar	Telugu	Trilingual film; Also producer	
2016	Tutak Tutak Tutiya	Krishna Kumar	Hindi	Trilingual film; Also producer	
2017	Kalavaadiya Pozhuthugal	Porchezhiyan	Tamil		
2018	Gulaebaghavali	Badri	Tamil		
2018	Mercury	Blind man	Sound		
2018	Lakshmi	Vijay Krishna aka Krishna / VK	Tamil	Partially reshot in Telugu	
2019	Charlie Chaplin 2	Thiru	Tamil		
2019	Devi 2	Krishna Kumar / Alex Britto / Ranga Reddy	Tamil	Bilingual film	
2019	Abhinetri 2	Krishna Kumar / Alex Britto / Ranga Reddy	Telugu	Bilingual film	
2019	Khamoshi	Dev	Hindi		
2020	Street Dancer 3D	Anna / Ram Prasad	Hindi		
2021	Pon Manickavel	Pon Manickavel	Tamil	50th Film	
2022	Theal	Durai	Tamil		
2022	My Dear Bootham	Karkimuki the Genie	Tamil		
2022	Poikkal Kuthirai	Kathiravan	Tamil		
2023	Bagheera	Bagheera Muralidharan	Tamil		
2024	Karataka Damanaka	Basavaraju / Damanaka	Kannada		
2024	The Greatest of All Time	Kalyan Sundaram	Tamil		
2024	Petta Rap	Balasubramaniam, Himself	Tamil	Dual role	
2024	Jolly O Gymkhana	Lawyer Poongundran	Tamil		
2025	Badass Ravi Kumar	Carlos Pedro Panther, Carlis Pedro Panter	Hindi	Dual role	
2027	Kathanar – The Wild Sorcerer †	Virtuoso	Malayalam	Post- production	
TBA	Moonwalk †	Babootty	Tamil	Post- production	
TBA	Bang Bang †	TBA	Tamil	Post- production	
TBA	Flashback †	TBA	Tamil	Filming	
TBA	Singanallur Signal †	TBA	Tamil	Filming	
TBA	Maharagni- Queen of Queens †	TBA	Hindi	Filming	
TBA	Musasi †	TBA	Tamil	Delayed	

== As a producer ==
List of Prabhu Deva film credits as producer
Year	Film	Language	Notes
2016	Devi	Tamil	Distributor of Telugu version Abhinetri
2017	Bogan	Tamil	
2018	Sometimes	Tamil	Alternatively titled Sila Samayangalil; Netflix film

== As a dancer ==
List of Prabhu Deva film credits as dancer
Year	Film	Song	Language	Notes
1988	Agni Natchathiram	"Raaja Raajathi"	Tamil	
1988	Jeeva	"Abracadabra"	Tamil	
1990	Michael Madana Kama Rajan	"Rum Bum Bum Arambum"	Tamil	Debut Tamil film as choreographer. Credited as S. Prabhu.
1991	Adhikari	"Naiyaandi Melam"	Tamil	
1991	Idhayam	"April Mayile"	Tamil	
1992	Unnai Vaazhthi Paadugiren	"Ippodhum Nippen"	Tamil	
1992	Suriyan	"Laalaku Dol Dappima"	Tamil	
1992	Johnnie Walker	"Shanthamee Rathriyil"	Malayalam	Debut Malayalam film as choreographer
1993	Prathap	"Maanga Maanga"	Tamil	
1993	Ezhai Jaathi	"Koduthalum Koduthanda"	Tamil	
1993	Gentleman	"Chikku Bukku Rayile"	Tamil	
1993	Walter Vetrivel	"Chinna Raasave"	Tamil	
2000	Pukar	"Kay Sera Sera"	Hindi	
2002	Baba	"Kichchu Tha"	Tamil	
2002	Shakti	"Dumroo Baje Re"	Hindi	
2004	Aabra Ka Daabra	"Shiv Om"	Hindi	
2006	Pournami	"Koyo Koyo"	Telugu	
2007	Pokkiri	"Aadungada"	Tamil	
2007	Shankardada Zindabad	"Jagadeka Veeruniki"	Telugu	
2008	Vaana	"Unnattaa Lenattaa"	Telugu	
2009	Villu	"Rama Rama"	Tamil	
2009	Wanted	"Jalwa"	Hindi	
2010	Pa. Ra. Palanisamy	"Netru Adhu"	Tamil	
2011	Engeyum Kaadhal	"Engeyum Kaadhal"	Tamil	
2012	Dhoni	"Vaangum Panathukkum"	Tamil	
2012	Dhoni	"Mattiloni Chettu"	Telugu	
2012	Rowdy Rathore	"Chinta Ta Chita"	Hindi	
2012	Oh My God	"Govinda"	Hindi	
2013	Ramaiya Vastavaiya	"Jadoo Ki Jhappi"	Hindi	
2013	Boss	"Hum Na Tode"	Hindi	
2013	R... Rajkumar	"Gandi Baat"	Hindi	
2014	Action Jackson	"AJ"	Hindi	
2015	Singh Is Bliing	"Singh And Kaur"	Hindi	
2019	Dabangg 3	"Munna Badnaam Hua"	Hindi	
2022	Lucky Man	"Baaro Raja"	Kannada	
2022	Godfather	"Thar Mar"	Telugu	

== As a playback singer ==
List of Prabhu Deva film credits as singer
Year	Film	Song	Language	Notes	Ref.
1997	Ullaasam	"Valibam Vaazha Sollum"	Tamil	Ending rap portions mouthed by Raju Sundaram	
1999	Suyamvaram	"Siva Siva Sankara"	Tamil		
2001	Ullam Kollai Poguthae	"Kinguda Kinguda"	Tamil	Sang the chorus portions	

== As a choreographer ==
List of Prabhu Deva film credits as choreographer
Year	Film	Song	Language	Notes	Ref.
2013	Boss	"Hum Na Tode"	Hindi		
2022	Godfather	"Thaar Maar Thakkar Maar"	Telugu		

== As a lyricist ==
List of Prabhu Deva film credits as lyricist
Year	Film	Song	Composer	Language	Ref.
2019	Charlie Chaplin 2	"Ivala Ivala"	Amresh Ganesh	Tamil	
2019	Devi 2	"Sokkura Penne"	Sam C. S.	Tamil	
