= Amma Vandhachu =

1992 film by P. Vasu

- Theatrical release poster
- Directed by: P. Vasu
- Written by: P. Vasu
- Produced by: Poornima Bhagyaraj
- Starring: K. Bhagyaraj; Khushbu; Baby Sridevi
- Cinematography: M. C. Sekhar
- Edited by: P. Mohanraj
- Music by: Deva
- Production company: Sharanya Cine Combines
- Distributed by: Surya Films
- Release date: 26 June 1992
- Running time: 145 minutes
- Country: India
- Language: Tamil

Amma Vandhachu (transl. Mother has come) is a 1992 Indian Tamil-language comedy drama film written and directed by P. Vasu, and produced by Poornima Bhagyaraj. The film stars K. Bhagyaraj, Khushbu and Baby Sridevi, with Delhi Ganesh, Vennira Aadai Moorthy, Chelladurai, Pandu, Rajesh Kumar, LIC Narasimhan and Junior Balaiah in supporting roles. It was released on 26 June 1992 and failed at the box office. For her performance, Sridevi won the Cinema Express Award for Best Child Artist. It is a remake of the 1986 Kannada film Ee Jeeva Ninagagi.

== Plot ==
Nandakumar, a medical representative, is a bachelor and lives alone in Bombay. He starts to meet the smart and quick-tempered woman Nandini in various situations. Nandini sells detergent soap door to door and lives with her father, a retired teacher. Nandakumar, who wants to get married as soon as possible, tries to seduce the bubbly Nandini and they fall in love. Even Nandini's father accepts their marriage. Everything goes well until the arrival of Vimala, a four-year girl. She introduces herself to Nandini as Vimala Nandakumar and she says that Nandakumar is her father. Nandini, with a broken heart, leaves the city with her father. What transpires later forms the crux of the story.

== Cast ==
- K. Bhagyaraj as Nandakumar
- Khushbu as Nandini
- Baby Sridevi as Vimala
- Delhi Ganesh as Nandini's father
- Vennira Aadai Moorthy as Mahalingam
- Chelladurai as Naina Mohamed
- Pandu as Senior officer
- Rajesh Kumar as Ramesh
- LIC Narasimhan as Businessman
- S. S. Mani as Rajapalayam
- Junior Balaiah as Senior officer
- Soundararajan as Incense stick seller
- Vijaya Chandrika as Mahalingam's wife
- C. R. Saraswathi as School teacher

== Production ==
The action scenes were choreographed by Vikram Dharma.

== Soundtrack ==
The soundtrack was composed by Deva, with lyrics written by Vaali.

Track listing
No.	Title	Singer(s)	Length
1.	"Soapu Madam Soapu"	S. P. Balasubrahmanyam, K. S. Chithra	4:55
2.	"Dhinathanthi Paperula"	Mano, K. S. Chithra	4:34
3.	"Unakkoru Thayirukka"	S. P. Balasubrahmanyam	4:16
4.	"Nandini Oh Nandini"	Mano, Swarnalatha	4:39
5.	"Unakkaaga Paadum Raagam"	P. Susheela, P. Jayachandran, K. S. Chithra
Total length:			18:24

== Release and reception ==
Amma Vandhachu was released on 26 June 1992 and distributed by Surya Films. Lalitha Dileep of The Indian Express stated, "an entertainment film; a fine amalgame of sentiment and subtle comedy that bear the trademark of Bhagyaraj's film" and praised the lead performances. K. Vijiyan of New Straits Times wrote, "this movie should satisfy all Bhagiaraj fans looking for his own brand of humour". C. R. K. of Kalki praised the film's comedy but noted that the film became too serious in second half. According to Bhagyaraj, the film underperformed commercially because "the first part was funny and the last too serious". At the 13th Cinema Express Awards, Sridevi won the award for Best Child Artist.
