= Vaada (2005 film) =

2005 Indian film by Satish Kaushik

- Theatrical release poster
- Directed by: Satish Kaushik
- Written by: Rumi Jaffery
- Based on: Sabhash by K. Subhash
- Produced by: Vashu Bhagnani
- Starring: Arjun Rampal; Amisha Patel; Zayed Khan
- Cinematography: Johny Lal
- Edited by: Steven Bernard
- Music by: Songs: Himesh Reshammiya; Score: Salim-Sulaiman
- Distributed by: Puja Films
- Release date: 7 January 2005
- Running time: 122 minutes
- Country: India
- Language: Hindi

Vaada (transl. Promise) is a 2005 Indian Hindi-language suspense thriller film directed by Satish Kaushik. The film stars Arjun Rampal, Amisha Patel, and Zayed Khan in lead roles. The story revolves around a murder amidst a convoluted love triangle. It was released on 7 January 2005. It is a remake of 2000 Tamil film Sabhash starring Parthiban, Divya Unni, and Ranjith.

== Plot ==
Rahul Verma and Karan Srivastav are business partners. The film begins with the discovery of the body of Pooja Verma, Rahul's wife. Pooja has apparently committed suicide by hanging herself; however, before the postmortem can take place, her body goes missing.

A flashback reveals that Karan used to be Pooja's boyfriend. Karan was extremely possessive of Pooja, and the pair broke up in the mall after an incident, and then later tried to force her to leave her father. After the breakup, Karan leaves town, and Pooja meets Rahul, who is a loving and successful businessman. The pair gets married; however, tragedy strikes when they are involved in a car crash and Rahul loses his eyesight.

Karan has now become a wealthy businessman and has become a partners with Rahul, unaware of who his wife is. At a meeting held in Rahul's house, Karan is shocked to learn that Rahul is married to Pooja.

In the present, the police investigating the case begin to suspect that Pooja's death is not a suicide after all. They also believe that Karan may have been involved in the crime. Pooja's jewellery and other evidence were found at Karan's house. Karan believes that he is being framed and enlists his lawyer friend Rajat Saxena to help him prove his innocence. Karan thinks that Rahul is the most likely suspect and sets out to confront him. Karan tries several tactics to prove that Rahul is not blind but ends up failing and bribing Rahul's servant, Alex, to confess that Rahul is not blind. He agrees to testify to this in court.

The men end up in a fight after Rahul uses his eyesight to save a young boy from an incoming train. It is revealed that Rahul has actually regained his sight and is not blind after all. Karan believes that Rahul had killed Pooja and forces him to confess, recording the admission. However, Rahul had control of the remote for the recording device and only captured Karan's words, making it appear as if he was confessing to the murder. The police, led by Inspector Khan, arrive at the scene. In court, Rahul testifies against Karan, and so does Alex after he exposes him to the bribe. Karan is arrested for the murder and sentenced to life imprisonment, and the judge rules that Saxena can no longer be Karan's lawyer. In the holding cells, Karan manages to bribe a constable, exchanging his watch for a tape recorder. That night, Rahul comes to meet Karan and tells him that he knows Karan did not kill his wife.

Rahul explains that he had found out that his blindness was curable and secretly travelled abroad for the operation, telling his wife that he was on a business trip. He intended to surprise Pooja, but upon his arrival, he found her in Karan's arms. This infuriated him, but he kept quiet. However, later that day, Pooja realised that he was no longer blind and short, and after that, she committed suicide. After her death, Rahul and Alex found an audio cassette recorded by Pooja. In the cassette, Pooja explained that while Rahul was on his business trip, Karan came to the couple's house. Pooja threw him out after an argument, but he followed her back into the bedroom and threatened to burn the house down with her inside it unless she renewed her relationship with him. Pooja had no choice but to agree to divorce Rahul and then marry Karan. That night, Pooja tried to contact Rahul, but Karan caught her and told her that the stress of the situation would cause Rahul to become permanently blind. The next morning, Karan wrote up divorce papers for Pooja and Rahul, after which he embraced her. At that moment, Rahul returned from his trip and saw the pair.

Rahul tells Karan that Pooja did indeed commit suicide, but her death was a result of Karan's actions, so he is her murderer. Rahul then explains how he vowed to get vengeance by framing Karan for the crime so that he and his wife may finally have peace. Karan reveals that he has finally caught Rahul and jubilantly shows him the tape recorder. However, Rahul tells him that he had anticipated this move and says that the tape recorder has no batteries. Rahul further reveals that Saxena has been working with him the entire time and helped him with the plan. He finally walks away, leaving Karan distraught and alone in his cell. In the end, Rahul is seen immersing Pooja's ashes in the river.

== Cast ==
- Arjun Rampal as Rahul Verma
- Ameesha Patel as Pooja Sharma / Pooja Rahul Verma
- Zayed Khan as Karan Srivastav
- Alok Nath as Mr. Sharma, Pooja's father
- Rakesh Bedi as Advocate Saxena
- Virendra Saxena as Alex
- Rajesh Vivek as Inspector Khan
- Shashi Kiran as Bank Owner
- Achyut Potdar as Judge
- Hemant Birje as Advocate Sanjay Arora
- Anjan Srivastav as Lawyer Khan
- Sarfaraz Khan as Singer in Ud Ud Ud Jaye.

== Soundtrack ==
Vaada

Soundtrack album by Himesh Reshammiya
- Released: 20 November 2004 (Digital release); 7 January 2005 (Film)
- Recorded: 2004
- Venue: Ghazipur
- Studio: Bollywood UP Studios
- Genres: Feature film soundtrack, Ghazal and Qawwali
- Length: 11:26
- Label: T Series
- Producer: Himesh Reshammiya

Himesh Reshammiya chronology
Ishq Hai Tumse (2004)	Vaada (2004)	Insan (2005)

No.	Title	Singer(s)	Length
1.	"Main Ishq Uska Woh Aashiqui Hai Meri (Woh Ladki Nahi Zindagi Hai Meri)"	Babul Supriyo, Alka Yagnik	04:21
2.	"Teri Kurti Sexy"	Adnan Sami, Anuradha Sriram	04:39
3.	"Vaada Hai Yeh"	Udit Narayan, Kumar Sanu and Alka Yagnik	06:01
4.	"Ud Ud Ud Ud Jaye"	Sunidhi Chauhan, Kailash Kher	05:27
5.	"Maula"	Talat Aziz	05:47
6.	"Main Deewana (Not in film)"	Udit Narayan, Alka Yagnik	05:23
Total length:			31:38

The soundtrack of the film was composed by Himesh Reshammiya.
