= 13th Cinema Express Awards =

1993 Indian film awards ceremony

- Date: 1993

Highlights
- Best Picture: Thevar Magan

The 13th Cinema Express Awards were held on 14 June 1993, and honoured the best of South Indian films released in 1992. The awards were announced in March.

== Tamil ==
Category	Recipient	Film
Best Film	Kamal Haasan	Thevar Magan
Best Actor	Kamal Haasan	Thevar Magan
Best Actor (Special Award)	Rajinikanth	Annaamalai
Best Actress	Revathi	Thevar Magan
Best Actress (Special Award)	Sukanya	Chinna Gounder
Best Director	Mani Ratnam	Roja
Best Director (Special Recommendation)	Bharathan	Thevar Magan
Best Story Writer	K. Bhagyaraj	Sundara Kandam
Best Dialogue Writer	Liyakat Ali Khan	Thai Mozhi
Best Lyrics Writer	Vairamuthu	Roja
Best New Face Actor	Vijay	Naalaiya Theerpu
Best New Face Actress	Ranjitha	Nadodi Thendral
Best New Face Director	Selva	Thalaivasal
Best Villain	Nassar	Thalaivasal
Best Music Director	A. R. Rahman	Roja
Best Cameraman	P. C. Sreeram	Thevar Magan
Best Dance Master	M. Sundaram	Surieyan
Best Stunt Master	Vikram Dharma	Thevar Magan
Best Comedy Actor	Goundamani	Surieyan
Best Comedy Actress	Manorama	Various
Best Playback Singer (Male)	S. P. Balasubrahmanyam	Senthamizh Paattu
Best Playback Singer (Female)	Minmini	Roja
Best Child Artist	Baby Sridevi	Amma Vandhachu
Best Actor (Special Award)	R. Sarathkumar	Surieyan

== Telugu ==
Category	Recipient	Film
Best Film	V. Madhusudhana Rao	Swathi Kiranam
Best Actor	Venkatesh	Chanti
Best Actress	Vijayashanti	Mondi Mogudu Penki Pellam
Best Director	K. Viswanath	Swathi Kiranam

== Malayalam ==
Category	Recipient	Film
Best Film	G. P. Vijayakumar	Rajashilpi
Best Actor	Mammootty	Kauravar
Best Actress	Anju	Kauravar
Best Director	Joshiy	Kauravar

== Solidaire excellency awards ==
Awards in this field were given to film producer and director G. V. Iyer, playback singer P. Susheela, art director R. Krishnamurthy and the editing duo B. Lenin-V. T. Vijayan.
