= Abhimanyu (1997 film) =

- Directed by: K. Subash
- Written by: K. Subash
- Produced by: C Chiranjeevi
- Starring: R. Parthiban; Ravali; Raghuvaran; Geetha
- Cinematography: M. V. Panneerselvam
- Edited by: Mohamed Raja
- Music by: Deva
- Production company: Sree Charan Films
- Release date: 5 September 1997
- Running time: 140 minutes
- Country: India
- Language: Tamil

Abhimanyu is a 1997 Indian Tamil-language crime film directed by K. Subash. The film stars R. Parthiban, Ravali, Raghuvaran and Geetha. It was released on 5 September 1997.

== Plot ==
Maasilamani, a dreaded don, spreads terror around him: triggering riots, smuggling illicit liquor and drugs. The police are exasperated by Maasilamani and send Assistant Commissioner of Police Abhimanyu to cope with Maasilamani. Abhimanyu is an incorruptible and strict police officer who has been suspended seven times for challenging his superiors.

Abhimanyu first reforms the corrupt constables and befriends the police officer Deraviyam. In the meantime, Manju falls in love with Abhimanyu. Then, Abhimanyu intercepts Maasilamani's illicit drugs shipments. At this point, Abhimanyu becomes Maasilamani's worst enemy in a very short time. Maasilamani cannot kill him directly for fear of having the police behind him. So he triggers a riot in a college to kill smoothly Abhimanyu but Abhimanyu stops the riot just in time. Maasilamani's right-hand Somu turns approver, Maasilamani henchmen manage to kill him and Deraviyam at the court. In anger, Abhimanyu wants to punish Maasilamani but he sees a familiar face in Maasilamani's house.

Abhimanyu is, in fact, an orphan. In the past, Abhimanyu's father was a heartless corrupt police inspector and Abhimanyu's mother Kausalya killed him. So Abhimanyu's sister was sent to an orphanage and the pregnant Kausalya in jail. Abhimanyu was born in jail. The person that Abhimanyu saw in Maasilamani's house is actually Ranjitha: his long-lost elder sister and Maasilamani's wife. What transpires later forms the crux of the story.

== Cast ==
- R. Parthiban as ACP Abhimanyu IPS
- Ravali as Manju
- Raghuvaran as Maasilamani
- Geetha as Kausalya and Ranjitha
- Vijayakumar as SI Thangaraj
- Chandrasekhar as Deraviyam
- Anandaraj in a guest appearance
- S V Ramadoss
- Peeli Sivam
- Ragasudha as Deraviyam's wife
- S V Venkatraman
- Veeraraghavan
- Kalidoss
- LIC Narasimhan
- Lakshmi Rattan as Raghavan
- Mohan V Raman as Saamy
- Gowtham Sundararajan as Ganesh, Maasilamani's son
- Ravikanth as Prakash, Maasilamani's son
- Venky
- Periya Karuppu Thevar as Basha
- Vaani as Manju's mother
- Lalitha
- Mahanadi Shankar as Pandu
- Crazy Venkatesh
- Jayaprakasam as Somu
- Ram
- Lakshman

== Soundtrack ==
The music was composed by Deva.

Song	Singer(s)	Lyrics	Duration
"Alva Vaayil Alva"	S. P. Balasubrahmanyam	Vairamuthu	5:23
"Romeo Juliyattu"	Devie Neithiyar	Mayil	4:45
"Meadam Enna"	Sabesh, Chorus	Ponniyin Selvan	4:17
"Thodu Vaanamaai"	K. S. Chithra	Vaasan	4:48
"Thai Unakku"	Uma Ramanan	Kalidasan	5:18

== Reception ==
R. P. R. of Kalki felt Parthiban's acting suited for cop role but panned his lengthy dialogues and dialogue delivery, he found Raghuvaran struggling to bring anything new to his character though he praised the pre-interval twist but it adds more confusion while panning heroine's track as unnecessary but praised Panneerselvam's cinematography.
