= Sundara Kandam =

1992 film by K. Bhagyaraj

- Theatrical release poster
- Directed by: K. Bhagyaraj
- Written by: K. Bhagyaraj
- Produced by: Poornima Bhagyaraj
- Starring: K. Bhagyaraj; Bhanupriya; Sindhuja
- Cinematography: Ravindra Kumar Tewary
- Edited by: S. M. V. Subbu
- Music by: Deepak
- Production company: Saranya Cine Combines
- Distributed by: J. S. S. Combines
- Release date: 15 January 1992
- Country: India
- Language: Tamil

Sundara Kandam (transl. The Beautiful Chapter) is 1992 Indian Tamil-language romantic comedy film, written and directed by K. Bhagyaraj, and produced by his wife Poornima. The film stars Bhagyaraj, Bhanupriya and Sindhuja. It revolves around a student (Sindhuja) who loves her teacher (Bhagyaraj), but he does not reciprocate.

Sundara Kandam was released on 15 January 1992, in the week of Pongal, and emerged as a success. Bhagyaraj won the Best Story Writer award at the 13th Cinema Express Awards. The film was remade in Telugu as Sundarakanda (1992), in Hindi as Andaz (1994) and in Kannada as Sundara Kanda (2001).

== Plot ==
Shanmugamani arrives as a Tamil teacher to a school. He is an alumnus of the same school, from where he studied very well, despite his poor background, he had topped his twelfth standard examination in the state. He is fooled by the students of the current twelfth standard batch, headed by a brilliant, but mischievous student Priya. Shanmugamani is irritated by her indiscipline and finds fault with whatever she does. Even so, Priya continues to prank him. There is also a student in the same class, who studied in school with Shanmugamani, and has not yet passed twelfth standard. Priya's classmates create a fake love letter written by Priya and put it in Shanmugamani's desk. Shanmugamani misunderstands that and believes that it another one of Priya's pranks, warns her and gives the letter to her. But Priya mistakenly thinks he has written a love letter to her and falls in love with him. Priya's classmates repeat the mischief again and again and Shangmugamani misunderstands it as Priya's mischief and complains to the headmaster. Priya is suspended without getting any chance to defend herself.

Later on, Shanmugamani understands that there is no fault with Priya and apologises to her. Priya, who also finds the truth insists since both their reputations have been spoiled in the school, it is better that both get into love and marry. Scared by her acts, Shangmugamani keeps away from her. But Priya does lose heart and chases after him to win his love. But Shanmugamani insists that it is not a good ethic for a teacher to fall in love with his student and reveals that he is not willing to marry her. Priya seeks TC from her school, discontinues her studies and pressures that she is not his student any more and he can marry her. Yet Shanmugamani does not yield to her. Priya shifts to her friend's home as a paying guest, which is next to Shanmugamani's house and makes her full-time job to love him. Unable to resist her torture, Shanmugamani marries a girl named Deivanai from an orphanage, which shocks Priya.

Shanmugamani has a great dream about his wife, but Deivanai does not have any qualities of his dream girl, yet she manages somewhat to live to her husband's expectations. Priya understands her situation and helps her without her knowledge. But when Deivanai finds the truth she gets furious that Priya tries to snatch away her husband from her and warns her that if she ever turns her face towards her husband, she would go violent. But later, Deivanai finds that Priya was his student and feels bad for her acts. Priya and Deivanai become good friends. Priya helps Deivanai to cook, to speak in English and all the ways to attract her husband. But the Priya-Deivanai relationship is not liked by Shangmugamani and he insists Priya to keep away from their life. Priya, on one hand, helps Deivanai and on the other hand, makes her attempt to win Shangmugamani's love and become his wife before her death. He gives a final warning to her that Deivanai will not keep quiet if she ever discovers Priya's attempt on him. Deivanai hears their conversation, but does not react to that, instead she her drags to hospital for a check-up. When Shangmugamani wonders why, Deivanai explains that she got a handkerchief of Priya with blood stains. Finally both come to know Priya is battling with her life with cancer and counting her days. Deivanai insists Shangmugamani to marry Priya so that her last wish is fulfilled. But Priya dies in her school in her classroom in the place where she sat wearing her school uniform.

In her last speech recorded on a tape, she praises Shangmugamani for being stubborn that a teacher should not marry his student at any cost. She presents her jewels to Deivanai and says she will be born again as their child. At the end, Shanugamani and Deivanai put the jewel on their baby, considering that Priya is born again.

== Cast ==
- K. Bhagyaraj as Shanmugamani
- Bhanupriya as Deivanai
- Sindhuja as Priya
- Junior Balaiah as Iyer, a teacher
- Chelladurai as a school principal
- Takla Ramu as Somasundaram, a teacher
- Ganeshkar as Krishnamurthy aka Kichan, student
- Ravikumar
- Kovai Babu as Babu, a student
- Nandagopal as Namachivayam
- K. R. Vatsala as Shanmugamani's neighbour

== Production ==
Sundara Kandam was written and directed by K. Bhagyaraj, who also played the male lead. His wife Poornima produced the film. The film initially began production in the late 1980s under the title Sir I Love You with Bhagyaraj himself and Rupini starring, but was shelved.

== Soundtrack ==
The soundtrack was composed by Deepak, in his film debut.

Track listing
No.	Title	Lyrics	Singer(s)	Length
1.	"Iravile Entha"	Vairamuthu	Mano, S. Janaki
2.	"Ithu Pallikooda Vayasu"	Vairamuthu	Manachanallur Giridharan, S. P. Sailaja
3.	"Kukku Kuyilonnu"	Kalidasan	Mano, S. Janaki
4.	"Poonkuruvi Paadadi"	Pulamaipithan	Mano
5.	"Vaa Vaa Paattu Paadalam"	Vairamuthu	Mano, S. P. Sailaja
6.	"Uruguthe Nenjam"	Vairamuthu	Mano, S. Janaki
7.	"Pattu Poochi"	Vairamuthu	S. Janaki

== Release and reception ==
Sundara Kandam was released on 15 January 1992, in the week of Pongal, was distributed by J. S. S. Combines, and emerged a success. Reviewing the film for Kalki, Ammu played on the title by saying "Sundara Commercial Kavithai" (Beautiful commercial story). At the 13th Cinema Express Awards, Bhagyaraj won the Best Story Writer award.

== Remakes ==
The film was remade in Telugu as Sundarakanda (1992), in Hindi as Andaz (1994), and in Kannada as Sundara Kanda (2001).
