= Insan =

2005 Indian film by K. Subash

- Theatrical release poster
- Directed by: K. Subash
- Written by: Naeem-Ejaz (dialogues)
- Story by: Krishna Vamsi
- Based on: Khadgam by Krishna Vamsi
- Produced by: Keshu Ramsay
- Starring: Akshay Kumar; Ajay Devgn; Tusshar; Esha; Lara Dutta; Laila; Koena Mitra; Rahul Dev
- Cinematography: Y. N. Murali
- Edited by: Ashfaque Makrani
- Music by: Himesh Reshammiya
- Production company: DMS Films
- Distributed by: Eros International
- Release date: 14 January 2005
- Running time: 141 minutes
- Country: India
- Language: Hindi
- Budget: ₹125 million
- Box office: ₹104.1 million

Insan (transl. Human) is a 2005 Indian Hindi-language action thriller film directed by K. Subash. It features an ensemble cast of Akshay Kumar, Ajay Devgn, Tusshar, Esha, Lara Dutta, Laila, Koena Mitra, and Rahul Dev.

It is a remake of Telugu film Khadgam (2002), directed by Krishna Vamsi.

Insan released on 14 January 2005 to mixed reviews from critics, with most of them praising Kumar's performance, but was commercially unsuccessful, grossing only ₹104.1 million worldwide against a budget of ₹125 million.

== Plot ==
Amjad is an autorickshaw driver who is searching for his long-lost brother Munna who since went missing and a struggler Avinash wants to be a star in the Bollywood Industry and win awards. Amjad wants to marry his lover Heena. But her parents want her to marry a rich man. So Amjad plans to win her parents' trust through playing a fake drama with Avinash and his friend to pretend and act as fake goons, and they involve Rathod to arrest and win Heena's heart. The plan goes wrong as real goons appear, but Amjad fights them, leading Heena's parents to agree to marry her to Amjad.

Meanwhile, Inspector Ajit Rathod a police officer is on a mission to eliminate a notorious terrorist Azhar who killed his wife in the past and the latter is underground from the eyes of the law and is planning to destroy Mumbai in order to release his aide Masood, who was arrested by Ajit. Avinash, who is a struggler, on the other hand, loses his job as an extra in films after an argument with an egoistic actor. A newcomer, Indu, is helped by Avinash to enter the industry, and soon both fall in love with each other, not knowing that she had been subjected to a compromise with the producer, Agarwal. Hopeless, Avinash decides to be an autorickshaw driver, but Indu apologises and encourages Avinash to be a good actor. Soon, Avinash and Indu's luck turns when the filmmaker casts them as leads in his next film after being impressed by their acting skills. Meghna, a news reporter, develops a liking for Rathod, but the latter is still traumatised and angered by his wife's death.

Azhar returns home after the exile, but seeking the same motive of destruction: planning a bomb blast on a train with passengers. He kills Rathod's friend, Inspector Deepak, and is on the loose. Rathod learns that Azhar is none other than Amjad's younger brother, Munna and arrests Amjad. Azhar calls Rathod at the Bandra Terminus, where he has kept passengers as hostages. He asks to make a deal to release Masood and Amjad and demands a helicopter for escaping to Pakistan.

Rathod goes according to the plan and reaches the station, where a horrified Amjad learns that his brother is a terrorist. Amjad pleads with Azhar to leave the innocent people, but the latter denies by naming his actions as jihad. A fight ensues during an explosion at the station, which kills Azhar's men. Just when Azhar and Masood try to attack Rathod and Amjad, both shoot them down. Rathod condoles Amjad, to which the latter refuses and disowns Azhar instead, stating that any person who kills innocent people in the name of religion should be gunned down. At the end, Rathod, Amjad, and Avinash, along with the hostages, return from the ambush.

== Cast ==
- Akshay Kumar as Amjad Khan
- Ajay Devgn as Inspector Ajit Rathod
- Tusshar as Avinash Kapoor / Rana
- Esha as Heena Khan
- Lara Dutta as Meghna Malhotra
- Laila as Indu Gill
- Koena Mitra as Sonali Rathod (special appearance)
- Rahul Dev as Azhar Khan (Munna), Amjad's brother and terrorist
- Sunil Grover as Mahesh Sharma / Ranga (Avinash's friend)
- Viju Khote as Real Estate Agent
- Laxmikant Berde as Laxman Mundi
- Sharat Saxena as Heena's father
- Asrani as Film Director
- Himani Shivpuri as Indu's mother
- Vivek Vaswani as Agarwal
- Archana Puran Singh as Rajjo
- Beena as Amjad's mother
- Ashok Samarth as Masood
- Mac Mohan as Parvez
- Rajendran as Head of Cobra gang (uncredited)

== Soundtrack ==
Insan

Soundtrack album by Himesh Reshammiya
- Released: 17 December 2004 (Digital Release); 14 January 2005 (Film)
- Recorded: 2004
- Venue: Mumbai
- Genre: Feature film soundtrack
- Producer: Himesh Reshammiya

Himesh Reshammiya chronology
Vaada (2004)	Insan (2004)	Blackmail (2005)

All lyrics are written by Sameer; all music is composed by Himesh Reshammiya.

Songs
No.	Title	Playback	Length
1.	"Chunri"	Alka Yagnik, Udit Narayan
2.	"Chunri" (Instrumental)	–
3.	"Is Tarah Deewane"	Kunal Ganjawala, Sunidhi Chauhan
4.	"Khwahish"	Alka Yagnik, Sonu Nigam
5.	"Rabba Mere Rabba"	Alka Yagnik, Udit Narayan
6.	"Rabba Mere Rabba" (Sad)	Alka Yagnik
7.	"Rain Rain"	Shaan, Sunidhi Chauhan

== Critical reception ==
Sumit Bhattacharya from Rediff criticised the film, stating, "Insan could be good for you. If you suffer from depression, or are traumatised, or suffer from insomnia".
