= Sundarakanda (1992 film) =

- Theatrical release poster
- Directed by: K. Raghavendra Rao
- Written by: Paruchuri Brothers (dialogues)
- Screenplay by: K. Raghavendra Rao
- Story by: K. Bhagyaraj
- Based on: Sundara Kandam
- Produced by: K. V. V. Satyanarayana
- Starring: Venkatesh; Meena; Aparna
- Cinematography: K. Ravindra Babu
- Edited by: Kotagiri Venkateswara Rao
- Music by: M. M. Keeravani
- Production company: Saudhamini Creations
- Release date: 2 October 1992
- Running time: 2:07:59
- Country: India
- Language: Telugu

Sundarakanda is a 1992 Indian Telugu-language drama film written and directed by K. Raghavendra Rao and produced by K. V. V. Satyanarayana under Saudhamini Creations. The film stars Venkatesh, Meena and Aparna playing the lead roles, with original soundtrack by M. M. Keeravani. It is a remake of the Tamil film Sundara Kandam. The film was a box office hit.

== Plot ==
Venkateswarlu arrives in the town and gets appointed as a Telugu lecturer in the junior college where he had previously completed his education. He is fooled by the students headed by a brilliant but mischievous student Roja. Venteswarulu is irritated by her indiscipline and finds fault with whatever she does. But this does not stop Roja from playing pranks on him. Tukaram, a classmate of Venkateswarlu (who is still a student for many years), and some other students create a fake love letter in the name of Roja and put it on Venkateswarlu's desk. Venkateswarlu misunderstands that it as another one of Roja's pranks and warns her and hands over the letter to her. But Roja considers that he wrote the love letter and falls in love with him. Roja's classmates repeat the mischief again and again and Venkateswarlu misunderstands it as Roja's mischief and complaints to the Principal, because of which Roja is suspended without any chance to defend herself.

Later on, Venkateswarlu understands that there is no fault with Roja and apologizes to her. Roja, who has also found out the truth, insists that since both their reputations have been spoiled in the college, it is better than both getting in love and marrying. Scared by her acts, Venkateswarlu keeps away from her. But Roja does not lose her heart and she chases him to win his love. But Venkateswarlu insists that it is not a good ethic for a teacher to fall in love with his student and reveals that he is not willing to marry her. Roja seeks TC from her college and discontinues her studies and insists that she is not his student anymore and he can marry her. Yet Venkateswarlu does not yield to her. Roja shifts to her friend's home as a paying guest, which is next to Venkateswarlu's house, and makes it her full-time job to love him. Unable to resist the torture, Venkateswarlu marries a girl named Nanchari from an orphanage, which shocks Roja.

Venkateswarlu has a great dream about his wife, but Nanchari does not have any qualities of his dream girl, yet she manages somewhat to live up to her husband's expectations. Roja understands her situation and helps Nanchari without her knowledge. But when Nanchari finds out the truth she gets furious that Roja has tried to snatch away her husband and warns her that if she ever turns her face towards her husband, she would go so violent. But later Nanchari finds that Roja was his student and feels bad for her acts. Roja and Nanchari become good friends. Roja helps Nanchari to cook, to speak in English, and all the ways to attract her husband. But Roja and Nanchari's relationship is not liked by Venkateswarlu and he insists that Roja keep away from their life, but eventually Roja's parents die in an accident. Because she became an orphan, Nanchari brings and keeps Roja in her house.

Roja, on the one hand, helps Nanchari and on other hand, makes her attempt to win Venkateswarlu's love and become his wife before her death. He gives a final warning to her that Nanchari will not keep quiet if she ever learns of Roja's attempt on him. Nanchari hears their conversation but does not react to that, instead she goes to a hospital for a check-up. When Venkateswarlu wonders why, Nanchari explains that she got a handkerchief of Roja with blood stains on it. Finally, both come to know that Roja is battling for her life with cancer and counting her days. Nanchari insists that Venkateswarlu marry Roja so that her last wish is fulfilled. But Roja dies in her college, in her classroom, in the place where she sat wearing her school uniform. In her last speech recorded on a tape, she praises Venkateswarlu for insisting that a teacher should not marry his student at any cost. She presents her jewels to Nanchari and tells her that she will be born again as their child. In the end, Venkateswarlu and Nanchari put the jewels on their baby, considering that Roja is born again.

== Cast ==
- Venkatesh as Venteswarulu
- Meena as Nanchari
- Aparna as Roja
- Hema Choudhary
- Gollapudi Maruthi Rao as Single Puri Sharma
- Kota Srinivasa Rao as Principal
- Bramhanandam as Thukaram
- Mallikarjuna Rao
- Nirmalamma
- Vizag Prasad

== Soundtrack ==
Sundarakanda

Soundtrack album by M. M. Keeravani
- Released: 1992
- Genre: Soundtrack
- Length: 26:43
- Label: Surya Audio
- Producer: M. M. Keeravani

M. M. Keeravani chronology
Sevagan (1992)	Sundarakanda (1992)	Aapadbandhavudu (1992)

Music composed by M. M. Keeravani. Lyrics written by Veturi. Chitra won a Nandi Award for best playback singer female. Music released on SURYA Audio Company. Keeravani retained the same soundtrack in its Kannada remake which was released in 2001.

Track listing
No.	Title	Singer(s)	Length
1.	"Sundara Kaandaku"	S. P. Balasubrahmanyam, Chitra	4:33
2.	"Ulikipadaku"	S. P. Balasubrahmanyam, Chitra	4:23
3.	"Aakasana Suryudundadu-I"	S. P. Balasubrahmanyam	4:18
4.	"Kokilamma"	S. P. Balasubrahmanyam, Chitra	4:41
5.	"Inka Inka"	S. P. Balasubrahmanyam, Chitra	3:52
6.	"Aakasana Suryudundadu-II"	Chitra	4:21
Total length:			26:43
