= K. Subash =

Indian film director and screenwriter

- Born: Subash Krishnan; 1959; Chennai, Tamil Nadu, India
- Died: 23 November 2016 (aged 57); Chennai, Tamil Nadu, India
- Occupations: Film director, screenwriter
- Years active: 1989–2016
- Spouse: Sudha
- Children: 2
- Father: R. Krishnan

Krishnan Subash (1959 – 23 November 2016), was an Indian director and screenwriter who directed Tamil and Hindi films. He is the son of R. Krishnan.

== Career ==
K. Subash started his career as an assistant to Mani Ratnam in Nayakan. He made his directorial debut with Kaliyugam with Prabhu. His second film Chatriyan starring Vijayakanth was a blockbuster. He made Ayul Kaidhi, Vaakumoolam and Uthama Purushan in the same period. He directed Pavithra with Ajithkumar. He directed another police drama Abhimanyu with Parthiban in lead role. He directed Ninaivirukkum Varai and Eazhaiyin Sirippil with Prabhu Deva. In 2000, he had planned a film starring comedian Vivek in a lead role titled Enakkenna Korachal?, though the film never materialized. Likewise, the following year, Subash launched a film titled Sarvaathigaari starring Arjun and Gajala, which was later shelved.

He again directed Sabhash with Parthiban. Subash then planned to act as the antagonist in a film titled Colombus featuring Raju Sundaram, but the project was stalled. He directed 123 with Prabhu Deva and his brothers which was Subash's last directorial in Tamil. He announced a project called Aayiram Poi Solli with Prabhu and Ramya Krishnan, the film was shelved after shooting few scenes while another film titled Sarvadhikari with Arjun also failed to proceed after its launch. He remade Telugu film Khadgam as Insan in Hindi with ensemble star cast featuring Akshay Kumar and Ajay Devgan. The film failed at box office and Subash opted against directing films and instead provided screenplay for Hindi film Sunday. Subhash had provided the story for Shahrukh Khan starrer Chennai Express.

Subhash has worked as the chief associate to Bollywood director Raj Kumar Santoshi in many films.

== Death ==
Subash died on 23 November 2016 in SRM Hospital at Chennai. He was suffering from kidney failure and was on dialysis.

== Filmography ==
=== Director ===
Year	Film	Language	Notes
1988	Kaliyugam	Tamil	
1989	Uthama Purushan	Tamil	
1990	Chatriyan	Tamil	
1991	Vaaku Moolam	Tamil	
1991	Ayul Kaithi	Tamil	
1991	Bramma	Tamil	
1992	Pangali	Tamil	
1993	Vintha Kodallu	Telugu	
1994	Pavithra	Tamil	Also producer
1994	Brahma	Hindi	remake of Bramma
1997	Nesam	Tamil	
1997	Abhimanyu	Tamil	
1999	Ninaivirukkum Varai	Tamil	
1999	Suyamvaram	Tamil	
2000	Eazhaiyin Sirippil	Tamil	
2000	Sabhash	Tamil	
2001	Love Marriage	Tamil	remake of Swayamvaram
2002	123	Tamil	partially reshot in Telugu and Kannada
2005	Insan	Hindi	remake of Khadgam

=== Writer ===
- Veedekkadi Mogudandi! (Telugu) (story)
- Sunday (Hindi)
- Chennai Express (Hindi) (story)
- Entertainment (Hindi) (story)
- Dilwale (Hindi) (story)
- Housefull 3 (Hindi) (story)

=== Actor ===
- Chakkara Viyugam (2008)
- Policegiri (2013) as Judge

=== Lyricist ===
- Aaya Onnu, Kaathadikuthu, Thirupathi Ezhumalai (Ninaivirukkum Varai)
- Husaine (Uyirile Kalandhadhu)
- Kalakura, Paalai Keele (Sabhash)
- Karu Karu, Yappa Yappa Ayyappa, Pachai Kallu (Ezhayin Sirippil)
- Ceylon Singala Penne (Sanditha Velai)
- Podava Kattina (Unnaruge Naanirunthal)
- French Classile (Aasaiyil Oru Kaditham)
