= Junior Balaiah =

Indian actor (1953–2023)

- Born: Raghu Balaiah; 28 June 1953; Madras, Madras State, India
- Died: 2 November 2023 (aged 70); Chennai, Tamil Nadu, India
- Occupations: Actor, drama artiste
- Years active: 1975–2023
- Spouse: Suzanna
- Children: Niveditha; Rohit
- Parent(s): T.S. Balaiah, Leelavati
- Family: Manochithra (sister)

Raghu Balaiah (28 June 1953 – 2 November 2023), popularly known as Junior Balaiah, was an Indian actor who appeared in Tamil language films. The son of actor T. S. Balaiah, he primarily featured in supporting roles throughout his career, which stretched over 40 years.

== Personal life ==
Junior Balaiah was born as Raghu Balaiah in Chennai (then known as Madras) on 28 June 1953. He was the third son of actor T. S. Balaiah. His home was Sundankottai, now in Thoothukudi district, Tamil Nadu. For personal reasons, he turned to Evangelism following Christianity.

Balaiah died from suffocation on 2 November 2023, at the age of 70.

== Career ==
T. S. Balaiah died three days into Junior Balaiah's first film as an actor. T. S. Balaiah was to have acted in a movie directed by M. R. Radha called Suttaan Sutten, in which Radha's son was to be played by Junior Balaiah and Balaiah's son was to be played by M. R. R. Vasu, but his death ended the production. Junior Balaiah then acted in several films but failed to recreate the success of his father. He subsequently became bankrupt and later began to practise Christianity, setting up a healing centre called Healing Stripes Ministry.

In the 2010s, Balaiah made rare appearances in films and won acclaim for his portrayal of a headmaster in Saattai (2012). He appeared in four films in 2015 including Thani Oruvan and Puli.

In 2014, Balaiah revealed his intentions of becoming a film producer to launch his son's acting career.

== Selected filmography ==
- Melnaattu Marumagal (1975)
- Ilaya Thalaimurai (1977)
- Thyagam (1978)
- Yamanukku Yaman (1980)
- Vazhvey Maayam (1982)
- Dhooram Adhighamillai (1983)
- Anbe Odi Vaa (1984)
- Karagattakaran (1989)
- Gopura Vasalile (1991)
- Vigneshwar (1991)
- Chinna Thayee (1992)
- Amma Vanthachu (1992)
- Rasukutty (1992)
- Sundara Kandam (1992)
- Amaravathi (1993) as Rickshaw driver
- Enga Muthalali (1993)
- Pavithra (1994)
- Veetla Visheshanga (1994)
- Avatharam (1995)
- Mayabazar (1995)
- Irattai Roja (1996)
- Pudhu Nilavu (1996)
- Vaettiya Madichu Kattu (1996)
- Kadhal Palli (1997)
- Vivasaayi Magan (1997)
- Raman Abdullah (1997)
- Cheran Chozhan Pandian (1998)
- Bharathi (2000)
- Aandan Adimai (2001)
- Shakalaka Baby (2002)
- Julie Ganapathi (2003)
- Jayam (2003)
- Winner (2003)
- Sringaram (2007)
- Vattapaarai (2012)
- Saattai (2012)
- Kumki (2012)
- Thunai Mudhalvar (2015)
- Thani Oruvan (2015)
- Puli (2015)
- Om Shanthi Om (2015)
- Sethu Boomi (2016)
- Narai (2018)
- Koothan (2018)
- Nerkonda Parvai (2019)
- Sanga Thalaivan (2021)
- Maara (2021)
- Yennanga Sir Unga Sattam (2021)
- B.D (2024; Posthumous film)

=== Web series ===
- Mugilan

=== Television ===
- Chithi (2000–2001) as James
- Vazhkai (2000–2001) as Prabhakar's father
- Chinna Papa Periya Papa (2014) Season 1 as Masanam
- Maya machindra serial(1999) as ginglan swamy
