= Brahma (1994 film) =

Brahma ब्रह्मा
- Directed by: K. Subash
- Written by: K. Subash; Anees Bazmee
- Based on: Bramma by K. Subash
- Produced by: S. Ramanathan
- Starring: Govinda; Madhoo; Ayesha Jhulka
- Cinematography: Y.N. Murali
- Edited by: P. Madan Mohan
- Music by: Bappi Lahiri
- Release date: 2 September 1994
- Country: India
- Language: Hindi

Brahma is a 1994 Indian Hindi-language action film directed by K. Subash and produced by S. Ramanathan. The film stars Govinda, Madhoo, Ayesha Jhulka in the lead roles. It is a remake of Subash's 1991 Tamil film Bramma.

== Plot ==
Suraj (Govinda) has a unique skill of looking at a child and making a painting of how that child would look after growing up. One day, he is approached by a person with the photo of a girl child and is asked to paint the photo of how she would look when she grows up. He starts the work sincerely, just to realise the motive behind this request. His client wants to find the girl, who is now grown up, and kill her in order to become rich.Suraj wants to help the girl. To put the killers offtrack, he instead paints the face of his dead wife.

What follows is a plot with lots twists and turns.

== Cast ==
- Govinda as Suraj
- Madhoo as Chanda
- Ayesha Jhulka as Asha
- Aruna Irani as Jamna Bai
- Prem Chopra as Janakraj
- Tinu Anand as Lawyer Pursottham
- Pradeep Shakthi as Goga
- Navin Nischol as Shiv Prasad
- Laxmikant Berde as Timepass
- Satyendra Kapoor as DSP Niranjan
- Asrani as Police Constable Khairatlal
- Arjun as Sundar

== Soundtrack ==
Songs were written by Prayag Raj.

Song	Singer
"Naam Jiska Zindadili"	Asha Bhosle
"Hanske Guzari Zindagi"	Kumar Sanu
"Pehle Pehle Pyar Ka"	Kumar Sanu, Alka Yagnik
"Pyar Ka Zamana"	Kumar Sanu, Alka Yagnik
"Chehre Padh Leta Hai"	Udit Narayan, Alka Yagnik
"Suno Meri Rani Ji, Bolo Mere Raja Ji"	Kavita Krishnamurthy, Bappi Lahiri
"Hum To Sharabi"	Sudesh Bhosle
