= Ayul Kaithi =

- Theatrical release poster
- Directed by: K. Subash
- Written by: K. Subash
- Produced by: A. N. Ramasamy
- Starring: Prabhu; Revathi
- Cinematography: Y. N. Murali
- Edited by: Krishnamoorthy; Siva
- Music by: Shankar–Ganesh
- Production company: Ram Balaji Movies
- Release date: 29 June 1991
- Running time: 130 minutes
- Country: India
- Language: Tamil

Ayul Kaithi (transl. Life sentence prisoner) is a 1991 Indian Tamil-language crime drama film written and directed by K. Subash, starring Prabhu and Revathi. The film revolves around an escaped prisoner seemingly seeking to kill his ex-girlfriend. It was released on 29 June 1991.

== Plot ==
Chandrasekhar, a prisoner sentenced to life imprisonment, escapes from prison to seemingly kill his ex-girlfriend Nithiya. Sudharshan, a police officer, tries to catch him.

== Cast ==
- Prabhu as Chandrasekhar alias Sekhar
- Revathi as Nithiya
- Goundamani as Sundarrajan
- Chinni Jayanth as Chandrasekhar's friend
- Jai Ganesh as Jeevanandham
- Livingston as Sudharshan
- Krishnamoorthy as Police officer
- Vaani as Jeevanandham's wife
- Vincent Roy as Kandhasamy
- V. Gopalakrishnan as Police officer
- John Babu in a special appearance

== Soundtrack ==
The music was composed by Shankar–Ganesh, with lyrics by Vaali.

Song	Singer(s)	Length
"Paaduthu Paaduthu" (solo)	K. S. Chithra	1:28
"Paaduthu Paaduthu" (duet)	S. P. Balasubrahmanyam, K. S. Chithra	4:10
"Oru Raakkkozhi"	S. P. Balasubrahmanyam, K. S. Chithra	4:52
"Kathazha Kadu"	Malaysia Vasudevan, Swarnalatha	5:52

== Reception ==
Sundarji of Kalki lauded the cinematography and Prabhu's performance.
