= Uthama Purushan =

- Poster
- Directed by: K. Subash
- Written by: K. Subash
- Produced by: V. Mohan; V. Natarajan
- Starring: Prabhu; Revathi; Amala
- Cinematography: Y. N. Murali
- Edited by: Raghu–Bapu
- Music by: Shankar–Ganesh
- Production company: Anandhi Films
- Release date: 1 September 1989
- Running time: 130 minutes
- Country: India
- Language: Tamil

Uthama Purushan (transl. Virtuous Husband) is a 1989 Indian Tamil-language thriller film directed by K. Subash, starring Prabhu, Revathi and Amala. The film, produced by V. Mohan and V. Natarajan, was released on 1 September 1989.

== Plot ==
Raghunath "Raghu" is a flirtatious playboy married to the simple and devoted Lakshmi. He works as a manager in a finance company and begins flirting with his new secretary, Rekha, who has been transferred from Bombay. To impress her, Raghu drinks at the party and returns home drunk, shocking Lakshmi. During office hours, he lunches with Rekha, who advises him to be more romantic with his wife. Acting on this advice, Raghu takes Lakshmi to the beach the following day. However, a man who had earlier seen Raghu dining with Rekha recognizes him and reveals this to Lakshmi, making her aware of her husband's association with another woman and upsetting her.

Raghu and his friend Sethu frequently pick up women for casual drives. On one such occasion, Raghu unknowingly gives a ride to Lakshmi and his sister Saraswathi. Unaware of their presence, he continues flirting with the other women and even lies that he is unmarried. Lakshmi and Saraswathi silently witness his behavior, but Raghu pretends innocence before his father and his mother-in-law, Thangam. Lakshmi chooses not to expose her husband to the family. Raghu rescues a young woman named Renuka from a group of goons who attempt to abduct her.

Through Sethu, Raghu learns that Rekha is a model and becomes physically attracted to her. Pretending he has official work, Raghu asks Sethu to arrange a private meeting with Rekha at a hotel room. He lies to his family, saying he is traveling to Trichy for work. On his way, he begins to reconsider betraying Lakshmi. At the same time, he encounters Renuka and offers to drop her off nearby. Coincidentally, Renuka gets down at the same hotel where Raghu has booked the room. Rekha later calls to inform him that she cannot meet him. While Raghu speaks to her at the hotel reception, Renuka is murdered, and her body is secretly placed in the cupboard of Raghu's hotel room. Unaware of the crime, Raghu vacates the room and returns home, having failed to meet Rekha.

Raghu is welcomed by the joyous news that Lakshmi is pregnant. Witnessing her love, Raghu resolves to abandon his flirtatious ways and becomes a devoted husband. The police investigation reveals that Raghu booked the hotel room under a false name. Tracing him through the auto driver and the hotel room boy, Subramani, the police arrest Raghu on suspicion of Renuka's murder. The family is shocked to learn that Raghu lied about traveling to Trichy and is now accused of murder. Raghu identifies the same goons who had earlier troubled Renuka. Seeking revenge for being beaten by Raghu, they falsely testify that he killed her. Raghu is granted bail when Rekha testifies that Raghu booked the room to meet her and had no connection with Renuka. However, Raghu's father is devastated to learn of his son's intentions to meet Rekha secretly. Hurt by the loss of trust and determined to prove his innocence, Raghu leaves home.

Raghu later learns that Rekha is married to Rajkumar, a disabled man who lost his leg in an accident. Rekha explains that she concealed her marriage to secure employment. Rajkumar, convinced of Raghu's innocence, offers him shelter while he searches for the real killer. Meanwhile, Thangam urges Lakshmi to return home after learning about Raghu's behavior, but Lakshmi refuses, believing in her husband. During a subsequent court hearing, Subramani falsely claims that Raghu entered the hotel with Renuka and murdered her. Enraged by the lie, Raghu confronts Subramani in court, leading to the cancellation of his bail. It is revealed that the real killer, Dinesh, had bribed Subramani and Raghu's lawyer Varadharajan to frame Raghu. Sethu overhears the conspiracy.

Feeling trapped, Raghu escapes from police custody while being taken back to prison. Lakshmi, assuming he might have gone to Rekha, visits her house, where Lakshmi realizes that Raghu is innocent and that Rekha is truthful, with no illicit relationship between them. Fearing exposure, Dinesh and his gang plan to kill Subramani. Raghu intervenes and kidnaps Subramani to uncover the truth. Lawyer Varadharajan reveals that he only pretended to side with Dinesh's men to identify Renuka's real killer. Under pressure, Subramani confesses that Dinesh had booked a neighboring hotel room and that Renuka had confronted him over cheating her in the name of love. In a fit of rage, Dinesh killed her. When Raghu left his room to take Rekha's phone call, Dinesh seized the opportunity to place Renuka's body in Raghu's room and later bribed and threatened Subramani to remain silent.

Lakshmi and Raghu's father thank Rekha for testifying in court despite damaging her reputation. Meanwhile, Dinesh storms into Raghu's house, holds his family hostage, and demands Subramani in exchange for their safety. He assaults Lakshmi and abducts Saraswathi. Raghu confronts Dinesh with Subramani, leading to a fierce fight. Raghu ultimately overpowers Dinesh, and the police arrive to arrest him, with Subramani turning approver and confessing the truth. Raghu later visits Lakshmi in the hospital and learns that she is safe and pregnant with twins. Overwhelmed, Raghu vows never to think of any woman other than Lakshmi. The film ends on a humorous note when Raghu briefly admires a woman at the hospital but immediately corrects himself by declaring that he is married.

== Cast ==
- Prabhu as Raghunath "Raghu"
- Revathi as Lakshmi
- Amala as Rekha
- V. K. Ramasamy as Raghu's father
- Nizhalgal Ravi as Rajkumar
- Charle as Sethu, Raghu's friend and peon
- S. N. Parvathy as Thangam, Lakshmi's mother
- Kuyili in a special appearance in the song "Vanga Kadal Idhu"
- Dinesh as Dinesh
- Ishari Ganesh as Subramani, the room boy
- Usilai Mani as a person at the bar
- Radhika in a guest appearance as a person in the hospital

== Soundtrack ==
The music was composed by Shankar–Ganesh.

Track listing
No.	Title	Singer(s)	Length
1.	"Vaikka Varappukulle"	Mano, K. S. Chithra
2.	"Selaiyai Uduthuna"	Gangai Amaran
3.	"Suriya Dhaagangal"	Mano, K. S. Chithra
4.	"Thaai Paadinal"	K. S. Chithra, S. P. Balasubrahmanyam
5.	"Vanga Kadal Idhu Vandhu Kulithidu"	S. P. Sailaja

== Critical reception ==
P. S. S. of Kalki found the cinematography and dialogues of the film as positive points.
