= Pangali =

- Poster
- Directed by: K. Subash
- Screenplay by: K. Subhaash
- Story by: Anumohan
- Produced by: V. Mohan; V. Natarajan
- Starring: Sathyaraj; Bhanupriya
- Cinematography: Y. N. Murali
- Edited by: Raghu; Babu
- Music by: Ilaiyaraaja
- Production company: Ananthi Films
- Distributed by: GV Films
- Release date: 12 September 1992
- Country: India
- Language: Tamil

Pangali (transl. Partner) is a 1992 Indian Tamil-language action comedy film directed by K. Subash. The film stars Sathyaraj in dual roles, Bhanupriya and Goundamani. It was released on 12 September 1992.

== Cast ==
- Sathyaraj as Sakthivel and Durai
- Bhanupriya as Saithai Tamilarasi
- Manorama as Durai's mother
- Goundamani as Kuyilkunju
- Napoleon
- Mansoor Ali Khan
- Vijayakumar
- Nadia Ali
- Shanmugasundaram
- Sathyapriya
- Vennira Aadai Moorthy
- Delhi Ganesh
- Idichapuli Selvaraj
- Bayilvan Ranganathan
- Silk Smitha as Durai's love interest (Cameo)
- Disco Shanti as Sign Language Specialist

== Soundtrack ==
The soundtrack was composed by Ilaiyaraaja.

No.	Title	Singer(s)	Length
1.	"En Raasi"	Mano
2.	"Kannamma"	Malaysia Vasudevan
3.	"Selvame"	Mano
4.	"Muttai Ellam"	Malaysia Vasudevan
5.	"Selvame"	Jikki	01:53

== Critical reception ==
MM of The Indian Express wrote, "Anu Mohan with his weak and insipid dialogues, K. Subash with his weak screenplay and callous treatment join together in a conspiracy to take the audience for long ride, making us wonder if this is the same Director that gave Chathriyan and Bramma". K. Vijiyan of New Straits Times wrote "This movie will satisfy Sathyaraj fans looking for fights, laughs and romance".
