= Sabhash =

- DVD cover
- Directed by: K. Subash
- Written by: K. Subash
- Starring: R. Parthiban; Divyaa Unni; Ranjith
- Cinematography: Ilavarasu
- Edited by: Krishnamurthy; Siva
- Music by: Deva
- Production company: Suda Lexmi Pictures
- Release date: 1 September 2000
- Running time: 134 minutes
- Country: India
- Language: Tamil

Sabhash (/səbɑːʃ/ transl. Bravo) is a 2000 Indian Tamil-language mystery thriller film directed by K. Subash, starring R. Parthiban, Divyaa Unni and Ranjith. It was released on 1 September 2000. The film was remade into Hindi as Vaada (2005).

== Plot ==
Srinivasan aka Seenu is the loving husband of Shanti. Seenu is blind, having lost his eyesight in an accident in the past. The film begins with Seenu and his friend Dharan Viswanath discovering that Shanti has hanged herself in the house.

With no strong suspects, the police closes the case as a suicide. But soon, several evidences surface which point to the possibility that Dharan is behind Shanti's death, including Dharan's shoe at the site of Shanti's cremation. He resolutely maintains that he is innocent, while Seenu too believes him initially. However, as the story progresses, Seenu seems convinced that his wife has been murdered and starts to suspect Dharan. Meanwhile, Dharan starts to suspect that Seenu is not really blind. Dharan wants to frame Seenu for Shanti's death, and, along with his friend Advocate Mohan, sets up traps to prove that Seenu is not blind.

A series of flashbacks show that Seenu and Shanti were happily married, but Dharan was also in love with Shanti. Seenu did have proper eyesight, but a car accident rendered him blind. Dharan took advantage of the fact and started troubling Shanti more, while she tried to stay loyal to her husband.

Seenu underwent a surgery without informing Shanti or Dharan to restore his eyesight, and came back home to surprise his wife, but he noticed Dharan being physically intimate with Shanti. So Seenu decided to pretend to be blind.

Eventually, Seenu admits to Dharan that he was pretending to be blind only to trap him and hold Dharan responsible for Shanti's suicide. Seenu convinces the police inspector Daniel Thomas and the court that Dharan is guilty, and Dharan is arrested. But Dharan insists the court to test Seenu's eyesight to prove his point that Seenu is not blind.

With no choice left, Seenu deliberately blinds himself again by staring at a bright light from a welding torch, and is hence proved innocent. Seenu meets Dharan in jail, where Dharan secretly has a voice recorder. Seenu seemingly admits that he got Dharan arrested, and Dharan claims to have recorded the full conversation. But Seenu reveals that the recorder has no battery in it, so Dharan cannot prove anything. The movie ends with Seenu leaving the jail to start a new life, while Dharan angrily yells at Seenu, but to no avail.

== Cast ==
- R. Parthiban as Srinivasan (Seenu)
- Divyaa Unni as Shanti
- Ranjith as Dharan Viswanath
- Delhi Ganesh as Shanti's father
- Thalaivasal Vijay as Inspector Daniel Thomas
- Pandu as Marriage broker
- LIC Narasimhan as Judge
- Poovilangu Mohan as Lawyer
- Mohan Raman as Advocate Mohan
- Ilavarasu
- Y. S. D. Sekhar as Sub-inspector Veera Pandiyan
- Sharmili as Police inspector
- Radhabhai as Shanti's grandmother
- Amirthalingam
- Kovai Kumar
- John Babu in a special appearance
- Kalyan in a special appearance

== Production ==
The film was originally titled as Paakkanum Pola Irukku (transl. Feel like seeing). It was shot in Ooty while three song sequences were shot at Kenya.

== Soundtrack ==
The soundtrack was composed by Deva.

Song	Singers	Lyrics
"Kanave Kanave" (Duet)	Krishnaraj, K. S. Chithra	Palani Bharathi
"Kanave Kanave"	K. S. Chithra	Palani Bharathi
"Kalakura Kalakura"	Sabesh	K. Subash
"Paalai Keeley"	Unni Menon, Anuradha Sriram	K. Subash
"Thank You"	Mano	Na. Muthukumar
"Ulagai Suttri"	Krishnaraj, Malgudi Subha	Na. Muthukumar

== Critical reception ==
Savitha Padmanabhan of The Hindu wrote, "The story [..] has several plot twists, some of which are predictable. But in a film that is supposed to be a murder mystery, the badly choreographed song sequences seem to be rude interruptions. Ideally, the film would have worked better if the songs had been cut out and the editing had been tighter." Visual Dasan of Kalki praised Ranjith's acting who overtook other actors and added Deva impresses in background score but messes up in songs and concluded saying it can be watched for one to one manship of Ranjith and Parthiban otherwise, one have to think about how to congratulate (sabash) Subhash after yawning. K. N. Vijiyan of New Straits Times wrote, "At the end of the movie, you may be moved to say "Syabas" (well done) to director Subash. He has provided a taut movie without losing its entertainment value".
