= Prabhu Deva =

Indian dancer and filmmaker (born 1973)

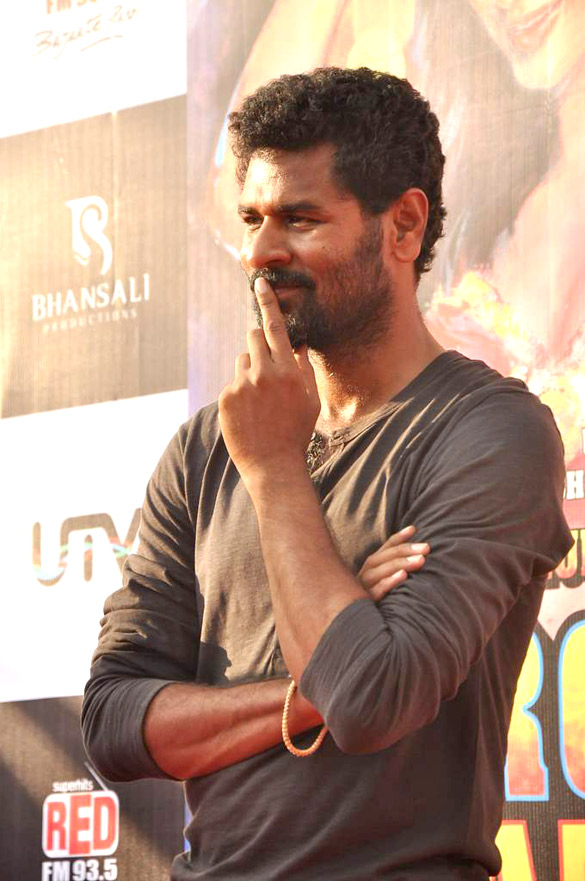
- Deva at the promotion of Rowdy Rathore in 2012
- Born: 3 April 1973 (age 53); Mysore, Mysore State (now Karnataka), India
- Occupations: Actor; director; dancer choreographer; producer
- Years active: 1991–present
- Works: Full list
- Spouses: Ramlath (m. 1995; div. 2011); Himani Singh (m. 2020)
- Children: 4
- Father: Mugur Sundar
- Relatives: Raju Sundaram (brother); Nagendra Prasad (brother)
- Honours: Padma Shri (2019)

Prabhu Deva (born 3 April 1973) is an Indian dance choreographer, film director, producer and actor who has worked predominantly in Tamil, Hindi and Telugu language films also appeared in few Kannada and Malayalam films. In a career spanning 32 years, he has performed and designed dancing styles and has garnered two National Film Awards for Best Choreography. In 2019, Prabhu Deva was awarded Padma Shri for his contributions to the field of art and dance.

Beginning with a series of acting roles in the 1990s and early 2000s, Prabhu Deva featured in several commercially successful films including Kaadhalan (1994), Love Birds (1996), Minsara Kanavu (1997) and VIP (1997). After further critically acclaimed performances in Kaathala Kaathala (1998), Vanathai Pola (2000), Pennin Manathai Thottu (2000), Alli Thandha Vaanam (2001) and Engal Anna (2004). Deva then failed to recreate the success of his earlier films and his box office value began to decline. He subsequently made appearances in supporting roles in Tamil. He then successfully ventured into direction with the 2005 Telugu film Nuvvostanante Nenoddantana, and the success of the project prompted further offers for Deva as a director. He then went on to make highly profitable films in Tamil, Telugu and Hindi languages such as Pokkiri (2007), Shankar Dada Zindabad (2007), Wanted (2009), Rowdy Rathore (2012), R... Rajkumar (2013) and Singh is Bliing (2015).

== Early life and family ==
Prabhu Deva was born on 3 April 1973 in Mysore, Mysore State (present-day Karnataka) in a Kannadiga family to Mugur Sundar and Mahadevamma Sundar. Inspired by his father Mugur Sundar, a choreographer for South Indian movies, he took up dancing, learning Indian classical dance forms such as Bharatanatyam from Dharmaraj and Udupi Lakshminarayanan. as well as Western styles. Raju Sundaram and Nagendra Prasad are his brothers.

Deva first appeared as a boy playing a flute in the song "Panivizhum Iravu", from the Tamil film Mouna Ragam (1986). He later appeared as a background dancer for a song in the 1988 Tamil film Agni Natchathiram. Deva's first venture as a choreographer was the Kamal Haasan starrer Vetri Vizha (1989). He has since then choreographed for over 100 movies. From choreography, he went into acting. In 1999, Deva, Shobhana and A. R. Rahman performed with a Tamil cinema dancing troupe at the "MJ & Friends" Michael Jackson tribute concert in Munich, Germany. As of 2010, he serves as chairman and director of the Prabhu Deva's Dance Academy in Singapore.

== Acting career ==
=== 1993–2004 ===
After a series of cameo appearances in songs from Tamil films, Deva was given his first lead role by director Pavithran in the romantic drama film Indhu (1994). Appearing alongside actress Roja and Sarathkumar, Deva's ability to dance was fully utilised in the song sequences, with gaana and disco music thereafter being regularly featured in his films. He made his breakthrough as an actor with Shankar's sophomore film, the romantic drama Kaadhalan (1994), where he portrayed a young student who first stands up against his lover's father and then an international terrorist. The film was highly lauded for its technical prowess and went on to win four National Film Awards, while A. R. Rahman's songs and Deva's choreography, especially in the songs "Mukkabla" and "Urvasi Urvasi", became very popular across India. Despite starring relative newcomers, the film went on to become the highest grossing Tamil film of 1994 and the commercial success made Deva a bankable actor. The film also saw success through its dubbed Telugu and Hindi versions, creating a market for Deva in other Indian regional industries.

While his next project Raasaiyya (1995) garnered poor reviews and collections, he continued to attract big-budget films and worked in two further films with music by Rahman in 1996, Love Birds and Mr. Romeo. Shot extensively in London, Love Birds received a wide theatrical release in overseas destinations and won Deva positive reviews for his portrayal. Meanwhile, for Mr. Romeo, Deva charged a comparatively high ₹60 lakhs for his remuneration and appeared in a double role alongside Shilpa Shetty and Madhoo. The music and dance portions of both films were praised by critics, though both endured middling performances at the box office.

Deva won critical acclaim for his role in Rajiv Menon's romantic drama Minsara Kanavu (1997), where he portrayed a streetwise hairstylist who inadvertently attracts the attention of a young woman, who he tries to help set up with another man but instead falls in love with her. Featuring Deva alongside Arvind Swamy and Kajol, the film went on to win four National Film Awards, three Tamil Nadu State Film Awards and a Filmfare Award mostly for the film's soundtrack by Rahman. Meanwhile, Deva also won the National Film Award for Best Choreography for his work in the song "Vennilave". A critic from Indolink.com wrote: "it is easy to become a fan of Prabhu Deva after this movie if you are not one yet", while Rediff.com referred to his performance as "graceful". Minsara Kanavu performed well at the box office and also had a wide release in Hindi, under the title Sapnay. His following release, the romantic comedy V. I. P. (1997), featuring an ensemble cast of Abbas, Simran and Rambha also did well commercially. Indolink.com described the film as "probably the feel-good movie of 1997", adding that "this movie is important as its probably the coming of age for Prabhu Deva" and that "he has definitely matured since his Kaadhalan days and shows a lot more restraint and a little flair for comedy". During the period, Deva also signed a big-budget bilingual Hindi and Tamil production titled Mazhai Vara Poguthey opposite Juhi Chawla. Despite beginning production, the film was later cancelled.

Deva continued to win critical acclaim and commercial success with his roles in the comedy film Kaathala Kaathala (1998), co-starring Kamal Haasan and the drama film Ninaivirukkum Varai (1999). Regarding his performance in the latter film, a reviewer from Indolink.com cited that "Prabhu Deva gets a wonderful script and character that he's comfortable in". He subsequently went on to feature in the Guinness World Record-setting film Suyamvaram (1999) and Vikraman's successful family drama film Vaanathaippola (2000), where critics praised his "histrionic abilities".

In the early 2000s, Deva actively began to work on more smaller-budget comedy films as his appeal at the box office began to decline. Despite winning critical acclaim for his performance as a bus conductor in Eazhaiyin Sirippil (2000) and commercial success with his work in Sundar C's Ullam Kollai Poguthae (2001), Manadhai Thirudivittai (2001) and Charlie Chaplin (2002), many of his other Tamil films during the period did not perform well financially. In this period, he also notably worked on the film One Two Three, The Winners (2002) along with Jyothika and real-life brothers, Raju Sundaram and Nagendra Prasad, as well as Siddique's successful hit Engal Anna (2004), with Vijayakanth. Subsequently, Deva moved on to prioritise acting roles in different industries, notably starring in off-beat roles in the Kannada film H_{2}O (2002), alongside Upendra and the Hindi film Agni Varsha (2002), with Amitabh Bachchan. He also worked extensively in the Telugu film industry, appearing in multi-starrer films or as the second lead actor, in projects including Santosham (2002), Kalyana Ramudu (2003) and Andaru Dongale Dorikite (2004).

=== 2005–2015 ===
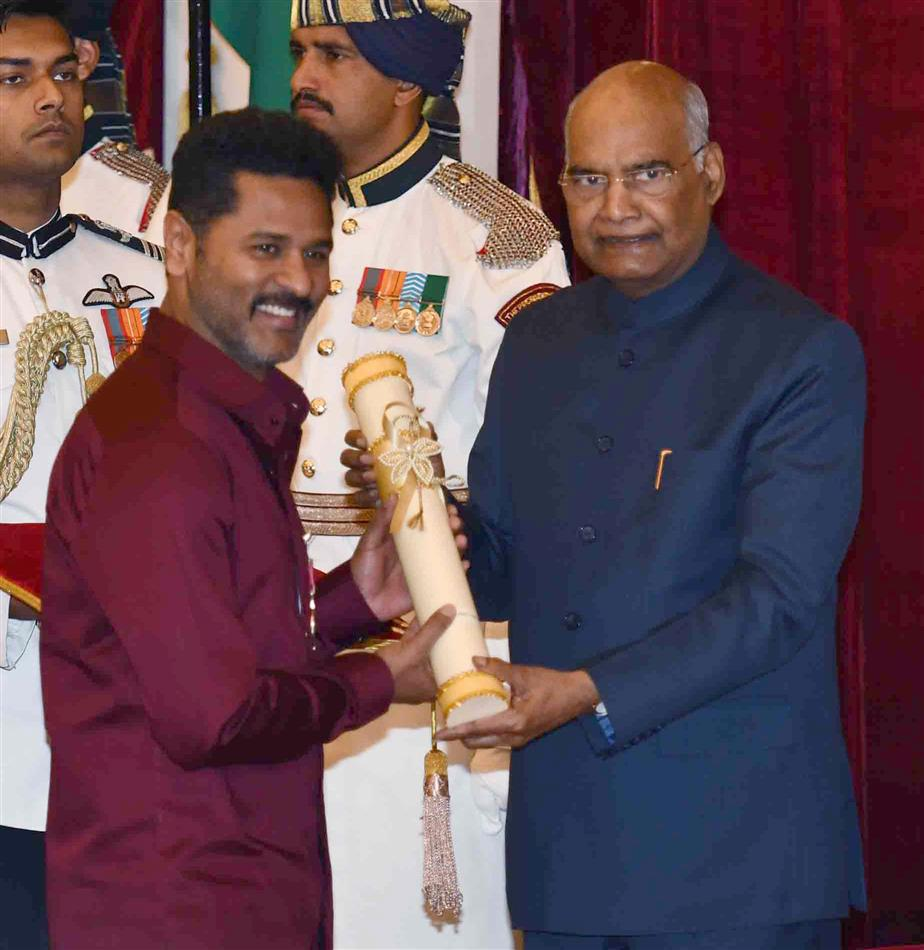
The President, Ram Nath Kovind presenting the Padma Shri Award to Prabhu Deva, at an Investiture Ceremony, at Rashtrapati Bhavan, in New Delhi on 11 March 2019

Following the success of his directorial ventures, Deva actively began to appear in fewer acting roles. He portrayed leading roles in the dance film Style (2006). Deva also portrayed a supporting role in Santosh Sivan's Malayalam historical drama film Urumi (2011), featuring in an ensemble cast including Prithviraj, Arya and Genelia D'Souza. The film opened to critical acclaim, while Deva was highly appreciated for his performance with a critic from The Hindu noting: Deva "excels with his standout comic repartee". He continued to make occasional appearances and portrayed leading roles in the dance films Style (2006), ABCD (2013) and its sequel ABCD 2 (2015). The films all performed well commercially, with a critic writing: "regarded as the dance legend by many, Prabhu is, expectedly, incomparable in dances, but the good news is that he handles the dramatic scenes well too" for his performance in ABCD.

=== 2016–present ===
Deva returned to Tamil cinema as an actor after a gap of 11 years with the 2016 film Devi, joining hands with director A. L. Vijay. The film was also simultaneously shot in Hindi and Telugu, titled Abhinetri and Tutak Tutak Tutiya. After several delays Thangar Bachan's film Kalavaadiya Pozhuthugal was released in 2017. The comedy driven heist film Gulaebaghavali (2018) was released in Pongal festival. Followed by silent film, Mercury (2018) and musical dance film Lakshmi (2018). The next was Charlie Chaplin 2 (2019) was released, which is a sequel to 2002 film Charlie Chaplin. He also debuted as a lyricist in the film. After that Deva appeared in Devi 2, which is a sequel of Devi. The film was simultaneously shot in Telugu as Abhinetri 2 and Khamoshi directed by Chakri Toleti, both co-starring Tamannaah. Apart from directing Dabangg 3 (2019), Prabhu Deva will also be seen in Remo D'Souza dance flick Street Dancer 3D (2020). Then, Prabhu Deva directed Salman Khan in Radhe (2021), a remake of the 2017 South Korean film, The Outlaws. He has acted in his 50th film as an actor titled Pon Manickavel (2021). In this film, Prabhu Deva will play a police officer for the first time. In 2022 he had three releases with Theal, My Dear Bootham and Poikkal Kudhirai. Prabhu Deva then delivered an intense performance in the film Bagheera (2023) despite the average reviews received. In 2024, he was seen in Kannada cinema after a long time and shared screen for the first time with Shiva Rajkumar for this period film Karataka Damanaka. He was cast in the action thriller film The Greatest of All Time starring Vijay directed by Venkat Prabhu.

== Personal life ==
Prabhu Deva married Ramlath, who later changed her name to Latha. They had three children, but their eldest son died of cancer in 2008, aged 13. In 2010, Ramlath filed a petition at the family court, seeking directions against Deva from live-in relationship with the actress Nayanthara and requesting a reunion with him. Furthermore, Ramlath threatened to go on a hunger strike if Prabhu Deva married Nayanthara. Several women's organisations conducted protests against Nayanthara for bringing disrepute to Tamil culture, burning an effigy of her. Ramlath and Deva divorced in 2011. In 2012, Nayanthara confirmed that she had ended her relationship with Prabhu Deva.

Deva moved to Mumbai and started residing at Boney Kapoor's old house called Green Acres. Prabhu Deva's mother Mahadevamma is from the village of Doora, about 17 kilometres (11 mi) from Mysore. He owns property in Doora, and has developed a farm there.

In May 2020, amid the COVID-19 lockdown in India, Deva married Himani, a Mumbai based physiotherapist at age 47. He had a fourth child, a girl, on 13 June 2023.

== Other appearances ==
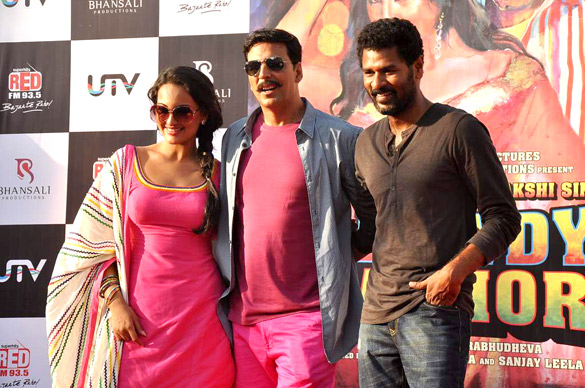
Deva with Sonakshi Sinha and Akshay Kumar during the promotion for the film Rowdy Rathore

Deva made brief appearances in solo items such as "April Mayile" in Idhayam (1991), "Lallaku Doldapi Ma" in Suriyan (1992), "Chinna Rasave" in Walter Vetrivel (1993), "Chikku Bukku Rayile" in Gentleman (1993), after appearing as junior artist in songs such as "Rajathi Raja" in Agni Natchathiram (1988). He performed with Madhuri Dixit in the song "Ke Sera Sera" for the movie Pukar. He acted along with Lawrence Raghavendra in the 2006 Telugu film Style. He performed with Apache Indian in the song "No Problem" for his film Love Birds.

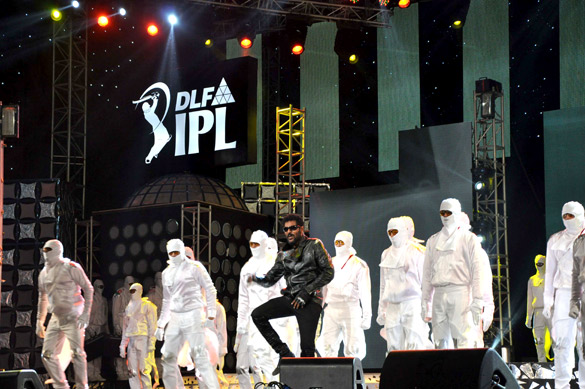
Prabhu Deva's performance at IPL Season 5 opening ceremony

He performed in the film Aabra Ka Daabra, for the song "Om Sh". He performed in the Nana Patekar and Karisma Kapoor-starrer film Shakti: The Power (2002) for a song. He performed with Upendra in the Kannada film H_{2}O. He made a special appearance in Pokkiri (which was directed by himself), with Vijay in the song "Aadungada". He performed again with Vijay in his own directional Villu for the song "Hey Rama" as a guest appearance. He performed with Bollywood actors Salman Khan and Govinda for a song in his 2009 directorial Wanted.

He performed at the opening ceremony of the 2012 Indian Premier League on 3 April in Chennai along with Amitabh Bachchan, Salman Khan, Kareena Kapoor, Priyanka Chopra and American singer-songwriter Katy Perry. The event was special to Prabhu Deva as he shared his 39th birthday on the same day.

== Honours ==
Year	Award	Category	Ref.
2015	Kalaimamani Award	Tamil Film Industry Contribution	
2019	Padma Shri	Padma Shri in the field of art-dance	

== Awards ==
Year	Award	Film	Language	Category	Result	Ref.
1994	Nandi Awards	Rakshana	Telugu	Best Choreography	Won	
1997	National Film Awards	Minsara Kanavu	Tamil	Best Choreography	Won	
2004	National Film Awards	Lakshya	Hindi	Best Choreography	Won	
2004	Filmfare Awards	Lakshya	Hindi	Best Choreography	Won	
2004	Nandi Awards	Varsham	Telugu	Best Choreography	Won	
2005	Filmfare Awards South	Nuvvostanante Nenoddantana	Telugu	Best Choreography	Won	
2007	Vijay Awards	Pokkiri	Tamil	Favourite Director	Won	
2018	Zee Cine Awards Tamil	Maari 2	Tamil	Best Choreography	Won	
