= Bramma =

- Poster
- Directed by: K. Subash
- Written by: Shanmuga Priyan (dialogues)
- Story by: K. Panneerselvam
- Produced by: M. Ramanathan
- Starring: Sathyaraj; Khushbu; Bhanupriya
- Cinematography: Y. N. Murali
- Edited by: Krishnamoorthy; Siva
- Music by: Ilaiyaraaja
- Production company: Raaj Films International
- Release date: 5 November 1991
- Country: India
- Language: Tamil

Bramma (/brəmmɑː/) is a 1991 Indian Tamil-language action thriller film directed by K. Subash and produced by M. Ramanathan. The film stars Sathyaraj, Khushbu and Bhanupriya. Goundamani, Vijayakumar, Pradeep Shakthi, and C. R. Saraswathi play supporting roles. It was released on 5 November 1991. The film was remade in Telugu as Brahma (1992), in Kannada as Ravivarma (1992) and in Hindi by the same director as Brahma (1994).

== Plot ==
Ravivarman "Ravi", a gifted artist with a unique ability to draw people's faces at different ages from their childhood photos, has turned to drinking for unknown reasons. He now lives aimlessly with his friend Valayapalayam Chinnasamy. The Police Superintendent seeks Ravi's expertise to draw the current face of the notorious terrorist George, responsible for a flight bomb blast, using an old photo. Initially hesitant, Ravi agrees to help and creates multiple portraits of George, leading to the terrorist's capture and life imprisonment. George vows to exact revenge on Ravi. Ravi's involvement in the case makes headlines, and he becomes famous.

Fernandes Nallathambi, a wealthy Rosewood Estate owner, approaches Ravi and asks for his help in drawing a portrait of his supposedly missing niece, Jennifer, who vanished at the age of five. However, Vellaiyamma, the estate's elderly housemaid, warns Ravi that Nallathambi is not Jennifer's uncle, but a ruthless servant who murdered her parents and seized the estate. Nallathambi is now searching for Jennifer to eliminate her and claim the properties for himself. Nallathambi's lawyer, Venkatasamy, advises him that time is running out to capture Jennifer and present her in court, or else the estate will be seized by the government due to lack of a legal heir. Nallathambi plans to marry Jennifer off to his son once they find her, allowing him to inherit the properties. After understanding Nallathambi's true intentions, Ravi creates a portrait and presents it as Jennifer's painting to Nallathambi.

Chinnasamy warns Ravi that drawing Jennifer's portrait will put her in danger. However, Ravi reveals that the portrait is actually of his deceased wife, Pavithra, and begins to share their tragic past. Pavithra, an orphan, was rescued by Ravi from her molesting relative, and he took her in, initially making her dress as a boy. He encouraged her passion for Bharatanatyam, and as she practiced, a police constable stumbled upon her in Ravi's home. To safeguard her, Ravi lied about Pavithra being his wife. When Pavithra's relative attempted to take her back, Ravi shielded her. Eventually, Pavithra fell in love with Ravi, and they got married, starting a happy life together. Tragedy struck when Ravi arranged tickets for Pavithra's Bharatanatyam competition in Delhi. Due to work commitments, he was unable to see her off at the airport. Soon after, he received devastating news that the flight Pavithra was on had suffered a bomb blast, killing all passengers on board.

Ravi and Chinnasamy are now on a mission to find Jennifer and keep her safe. They use musical notes stolen from Jennifer's room to contact musician Gangai Amaran, who decodes the notes into a tune. Ravi later spots Jennifer in a newspaper article, and they track her down to a boarding school where she's working as a teacher to warn her about her wealth and the dangers that come with it. After a few failed attempts, Ravi plays the family song to gain her trust. Initially, Jennifer believes Ravi is Nallathambi's henchman sent to kill her, but after learning more about Ravi, she starts to trust him and develops feelings for him. However, Ravi doesn't reciprocate her emotions. Jennifer tries to help Ravi overcome his drinking habit, but her efforts are met with resistance. When Pavithra's memory seems to threaten Ravi's connection with Jennifer, he slaps Jennifer, telling her not to push him.

Meanwhile, Nallathambi seeks the help of terrorist George, his former aide, to find and kill Jennifer. Unbeknownst to everyone, Pavithra is alive but in a coma at the same hospital where George is being treated. George mistakes Pavithra for Jennifer based on Ravi's portrait and kidnaps her. However, Ravi intervenes, and George escapes after injecting Ravi with a sedative, leaving Pavithra behind. Pavithra awakens from her coma, revealing that she didn't board the flight she was supposed to due to giving her ticket to another woman. Instead, she was chased by a molesting relative and hit by a speeding car, leading to her coma. Now pregnant, Pavithra goes to Ravi's house, but he's not there. She finds a money order receipt from Nallathambi meant for Ravi and heads to Rosewood Estate to find Ravi. Upon her arrival, Nallathambi realizes that Ravi had intentionally drawn Pavithra's portrait instead of Jennifer's to protect the real Jennifer. Nallathambi understands that Ravi still believes Pavithra died in the flight crash.

After learning the truth from Nallathambi, Ravi rushes to Rosewood Estate and is overjoyed to find his wife Pavithra alive. However, Nallathambi threatens to kill Pavithra with bombs unless Ravi brings Jennifer to him. With no other option, Ravi hands Jennifer over to George. But George outsmarts Ravi, escapes with Jennifer, leaving Ravi behind. Just as Jennifer is about to transfer her properties to Nallathambi, Ravi arrives and engages in a fight against Nallathambi, George, and their henchmen. In the chaos, George dies in his bomb blast, and finally, Nallathambi and his son are arrested. The film concludes with Ravi reuniting with Pavithra and Jennifer, who had developed feelings for Ravi, tearfully bids farewell to the couple. Coincidentally, Chinnasamy joins the couple on the train, adding to the emotional closure.

== Cast ==
- Sathyaraj as Ravivarman "Ravi"
- Bhanupriya as Pavithra
- Khushbu as Jennifer
- Vijayakumar as Fernandes Nallathambi
- Goundamani as Valayapalayam Chinnasamy
- Girish Karnad in a special appearance as Jennifer's father
- Gangai Amaran in a cameo appearance as himself
- Vennira Aadai Moorthy in a cameo appearance as a constable
- Pradeep Shakthi as George
- Veeraraghavan as Superintendent of Police
- R. P. Viswam as Venkatasamy, Nallathambi's lawyer
- C. K. Saraswathi as Vellaiyamma, a housemaid
- Radhabai as mother superior
- Baby Srilekha as young Jennifer

== Soundtrack ==
The music composed by Ilaiyaraaja.

Song	Singers	Lyrics	Length
"Engiruntho"	S. P. Balasubrahmanyam	Vaali	05:07
"Ival Oru Ilanguruvi"	S. Janaki	Vaali	04:53
"Nadapadhu Nadakattum"	S. P. Balasubrahmanyam	Gangai Amaran	05:04
"Raathiri Neram Railadi Oram"	S. Janaki, S. P. Balasubrahmanyam	Vaali	05:04
"Varuthu Varuthu"	S. Janaki, S. P. Balasubrahmanyam	Vaali	05:02

== Critical reception ==
The Indian Express wrote, "Its an elaborately worked out formula film, with ample opportunity for Sathyaraj to swagger around in his informal manner". Sundarji of Kalki wrote that the screenplay was filled with twists, but wondered if such a film needed some kind of thrill and horror, and they could not find it anywhere in the film.
