= Pavithra (film) =

- Theatrical release poster
- Directed by: K. Subash
- Written by: K. Subash
- Produced by: K. Subash
- Starring: Radhika; Nassar; Ajith Kumar; Keerthana
- Cinematography: Bernat S. David
- Edited by: P. Madhan Mohan
- Music by: A. R. Rahman
- Production company: Thanuja Films
- Release date: 2 November 1994
- Running time: 138 minutes
- Country: India
- Language: Tamil

Pavithra is a 1994 Indian Tamil-language drama film written, produced and directed by K. Subash under his home banner, Dhanooja Films. The film stars Radhika, Nassar, Ajith Kumar and Keerthana. It was released on 2 November 1994, Diwali day, and won two National Film Awards: Best Male Playback Singer (P. Unnikrishnan) and Best Lyrics (Vairamuthu).

== Plot ==
Ashok R. is an 18 year-old cancer patient, and Pavithra is a nurse in the hospital where he is being treated. Ashok and 18 year-old Chitra have been in love, which started a few months before his diagnosis. Ashok believes himself to be an orphan. On reading Ashok's medical records Pavithra sees that Ashok's initial is R, which means (in Tamil Nadu) that his father's name starts with the same letter. Raghunathan "Raghu" is Pavithra's husband. Since Ashok's age and date of birth are the same as her child (which was seemingly stillborn, and she is childless), Pavithra showers maternal affection on him. Raghu mistakes this maternal affection as something else because of a rogue doctor. This doctor unsuccessfully lusts for Pavithra and is hated by her. Confusion ensues, and Pavithra misunderstands Ashok. In the end, Ashok dies without the film revealing whether he was actually Pavithra and Raghu's biological son (initially thought to be stillborn) or not. Pavithra adopts a baby boy as her own child.

== Cast ==
- Radhika as Pavithra
- Nassar as Raghunathan "Raghu"
- Ajith Kumar as Ashok R
- Keerthana as Chitra
- S. S. Chandran as Raghu's neighbour
- Vadivelu as Thenmozhi's husband
- Kovai Sarala as Thenmozhi
- Disco Shanti as Shiba
- Junior Balaiah
- Kitty as doctor
- Vichu Vishwanath as the rogue doctor
- Kaka Radhakrishnan as Subbu's grandfather
- R. S. Shivaji as Subbu
- Loose Mohan as Rickshaw driver
- Amirthalingam as the postman

== Production ==
Ajith's voice was dubbed by Sekar. Comedy actor Amirthalingam made his debut through this film.

== Soundtrack ==
The soundtrack was composed by A. R. Rahman. The song "Sevvaanam" is based on "Mamboove", composed by Rahman for the Malayalam film Yoddha (1992). The song "Uyirum Neeyae" is set in the Carnatic raga Khamas.

Track listing
No.	Title	Lyrics	Singer(s)	Length
1.	"Sevvaanam Chinna Pen"	Vairamuthu	Mano, Pallavi	3:47
2.	"Eechambazham"	Palani Bharathi	Shahul Hameed, K. S. Chithra	4:59
3.	"Uyirum Neeyae"	Vairamuthu	P. Unnikrishnan	5:25
4.	"Azhagu Nilave"	Vairamuthu	K. S. Chithra	5:23
5.	"Mottu Vitadha"	Vairamuthu	Swarnalatha	4:36
Total length:				24:09

== Release and reception ==
Pavithra was released on 2 November 1994, Diwali day. Malini Mannath of The Indian Express said, "The writer-director should be commended for giving importance to the story line and the scenes in some places are really touching. But certain crucial episodes have been shoddily treated". K. Vijiyan of New Straits Times said the story, though unusual to Tamil cinema, was not well developed or brought across effectively, and "The director's inexperience in tackling sentimental subjects shows. Radhika may be a good actress but she needs a good director". Thulasi of Kalki applauded the performances of Radhika and Nassar, the music by Rahman and the cinematography, but criticised the inclusion of a dance sequence. The film went on to win two National Film Awards: Best Male Playback Singer (Unnikrishnan) and Best Lyrics (Vairamuthu). Furthermore, the film won third prize in the Tamil Nadu State Film Award for Best Film winners list. According to Ajith, the film changed the course of his life "to a certain extent".
