= Ullam Kollai Poguthae =

2001 film by Sundar C.

- Poster
- Directed by: Sundar C
- Written by: A. C. Mugil (dialogues)
- Screenplay by: Sundar C
- Story by: A. C. Mugil
- Produced by: K. Muralitharan; V. Swaminathan; G. Venugopal
- Starring: Prabhu Deva; Anjala Zaveri
- Cinematography: U. K. Senthil Kumar
- Edited by: P. Sai Suresh
- Music by: Karthik Raja
- Production company: Lakshmi Movie Makers
- Release date: 9 February 2001
- Running time: 143 minutes
- Country: India
- Language: Tamil

Ullam Kollai Poguthae (transl. The heart is going to be looted) is a 2001 Indian Tamil-language romantic comedy film directed by Sundar C, who wrote the screenplay as well. The film stars Prabhu Deva and Anjala Zaveri, with Karthik in a guest appearance. Deepa Venkat and Vivek play other supporting roles. The film was released on 9 February 2001.

== Plot ==
Anbu is a small-time mimicry artist living with his only sister Bharathi. Anbu falls in love with Bharathi's close friend Jyothi, who hails from a rich family. Jyothi visits Bharathi's home frequently, but Anbu does not have the courage to propose to Jyothi. When Anbu makes up his mind to propose to Jyothi, suddenly there comes Gautham from the US, who happens to be Jyothi's family friend. Anbu understands that Gautham and Jyothi are in a relationship and that their families plan for their wedding. A heartbroken Anbu decides to keep his love within himself.

One day, when Gautham and Jyothi are out for shopping, they meet with an accident where Gautham passes away and Jyothi loses her vision. As per the doctor's advice, Jyothi's parents decide to hide the truth about Gautham's death to Jyothi as that would put her into mental trauma. When Jyothi asks for Gautham, suddenly Anbu steps in and speaks in Gautham's voice to make her believe that Gautham is fine after the accident. Jyothi undergoes treatment, and a surgery is planned after a few weeks, following which she could get back her vision.

In the meantime, Anbu acts as Gautham to Jyothi until she gets her vision back. Anbu gets an offer to perform mimicry in a show in Australia, but he turns it down as he wishes to be with Jyothi. At the same time, Anbu feels guilty that he has missed an opportunity to perform in the Australian show, which could have helped him earn some money for Bharathi's wedding plans. Jyothi undergoes surgery and gets back her vision and she asks for Gautham. However, her parents convince her, saying that Gautham has gone to the US for some urgent work.

Anbu, unable to bear his love failure as well as his inability to earn money for Bharathi's wedding, decides to commit suicide as Bharathi would receive some relief fund from mimicry association which could be used for her wedding. Anbu writes a letter and leaves his home with poison. Bharathi finds out about Anbu's decision and searches him. Meanwhile, Jyothi watches her friend's wedding video which she attended when she was blind along with Anbu and understands that it was Anbu who was in place of Gautham. Jyothi cries upon knowing about the fate of Gautham. Bharathi comes to Jyothi's house in search of Anbu and informs her about Anbu's love and his sacrifice. Anbu goes to a stage show to meet his friends before committing suicide. Jyothi and Bharathi also reach the show where Jyothi speaks on stage thanking Anbu, hoping that he might see it from somewhere. Jyothi also proposes to marry Anbu. Anbu hears this and feels happy. Finally, Anbu and Jyothi are united.

== Cast ==
- Prabhu Deva as Anbu
- Anjala Zaveri as Jyothi
- Deepa Venkat as Bharathi
- Vivek as Arivu
- Chitra Lakshmanan as Jyothi's father
- Jyothi as Saradha, Jyothi's mother
- Dhamu as Thamizharasan, Anbu's friend
- Mayilswamy as Anbu's friend
- Santhana Bharathi as Santhanam
- Yuvarani as Lavanya
- Kumarimuthu as Annachi
- Singamuthu as Computer astrologer
- Oru Viral Krishna Rao as Jobless man
- Bayilvan Ranganathan as Ranganathan
- Chelladurai as MLA Sarangan
- Kottai Perumal as Inspector Ekambaram
- Vasuki as Sivagami
- K. S. Jayalakshmi as Santhanam's wife
- Omakuchi Narasimhan as customer visiting gemologist
- Periya Karuppu Thevar as Illicit liquor smuggler
- Kullamani as Illicit liquor smuggler
- Idichapuli Selvaraj as Police inspector
- Vijay Ganesh as Tea master
- Kottachi as man sleeping under a tree
- Kumaresan as man with an umbrella
- Thalapathy Dinesh as Rowdy
- Vichu Viswanath as Rowdy
- Stunt Silva as Rowdy
- V. Swaminathan as Orphanage director
- A. C. Mugil as Lavanya's husband
- Halwa Vasu
- Karthik as Gautham (guest appearance)
- Soori as Illicit liquor smuggler (uncredited role)
- Sarath Kumar as himself (cameo appearance)
- Senthil as himself (cameo appearance)
- Gangai Amaran as himself (cameo appearance)
- Sundar C as Doctor (cameo appearance)

== Soundtrack ==
The music was composed by Karthik Raja.

Song	Singers	Lyrics
"Uyirae Enuyirae"	Hariharan	Pa. Vijay
"Puyale Puyale"	Udit Narayan	Pa. Vijay
"Oru Palaivanathai"	Hariharan	Pa. Vijay
"Kinguda Kinguda"	Mano, Prabhudeva, Yuvan Shankar Raja	Kalaikumar
"Anjala Anjala"	Devan Ekambaram, Harini	Kalaikumar
"Kavithaigal Sollava"	S. P. Balasubrahmanyam, Sujatha	Pa. Vijay
"Kavthaigal Sollava" II	Hariharan	Pa. Vijay
"Kathavai Naan"	Karthik Raja, Hariharan	Pa. Vijay
"Anbe Anbe"	P. Unnikrishnan	Pa. Vijay
"Adadaa Adadaa"	Karthik Raja	Pa. Vijay

== Reception ==
Malini Mannath of Chennai Online called it "a sensitively crafted film, the scenes flowing smoothly, and remains a clean wholesome family entertainer". Krishna Chidambaram of Kalki wrote Deepa Venkat's simple acting is the only thing that will be remembered after watching the film. Cinesouth wrote "The first half of the film is very beautiful. The scenes have been chiseled well like poems. The small songs appeal very much to the hearts. The comedy of Vivek is classic. With all these pulses, Sunder.C blows up the chance of making the sreeenplay a grand success in the second half". The Hindu wrote, "The screenplay and direction are by Sundar. C, who begins well but seems to have lost his grip towards the end". Indiainfo wrote "Even though many directors promised to show a ` different' Prabhu Deva and failed, the credit goes to C Sundar for making Prabhu Deva act and not just be the dancing acrobat and an urchin doing mimic acts in film after film.In an otherwise simple storyline the director has woven a fine screenplay to bring about sentiments that tug at your heart".
