= Kaliyugam (1988 film) =

1988 film by K. Subash

- Poster
- Directed by: K. Subash
- Written by: K. Subash
- Produced by: V. Mohan; V. Natrajan
- Starring: Prabhu; Raghuvaran; Amala; Geetha
- Cinematography: Y. N. Murali
- Edited by: P. Madhan Mohan
- Music by: Chandrabose
- Production company: Anandhi Films
- Release date: 8 November 1988
- Running time: 130 minutes
- Country: India
- Language: Tamil

Kaliyugam (transl. Age of Vice) is a 1988 Indian Tamil-language action film directed by debutant K. Subash, starring Prabhu, Raghuvaran, Amala and Geetha. It was released on 8 November 1988.

== Plot ==
Kaliyugam is the story of an honest police officer and a lawyer who often had to take the route of action to help the poor from the rich and powerful.

== Cast ==
- Prabhu as Inspector Dilip
- Raghuvaran Advocate Mahesh
- Amala as Nithya, Mahesh's Love interest
- Geetha as Lalitha, Dilip's wife
- Janagaraj
- Ponnambalam
- Master Amith as Dilip and Lalitha's son
- P. S. Veerappa
- Pradeep Shakthi

== Soundtrack ==
The soundtrack was composed by Chandrabose.

Track listing
No.	Title	Singer(s)	Length
1.	"Ilanguyil Paadutho"	S. P. Balasubrahmanyam, K. S. Chithra
2.	"Palliyile"	S. P. Balasubrahmanyam
3.	"Vayadhukku"	Mano, Vani Jairam
4.	"Adutha Veettu"	Gangai Amaran
5.	"Anbe Yosi"	S. P. Sailaja

== Reception ==
NKS of The Indian Express wrote, "Kaliyugam shares with Nayagan and Agni Natchathiram a penchant for dramatic washed-out lighting schemes". Jayamanmadhan of Kalki criticised the film for its story and music, as well as over-reliance on action.
