= Rojavai Killathe =

- Poster
- Directed by: Suresh Krissna
- Screenplay by: Suresh Krissna
- Story by: Ananthu
- Produced by: K. Sukumar
- Starring: Arjun; Khushbu
- Cinematography: P. S. Prakash
- Edited by: Gowtham Raju
- Music by: Deva
- Production company: Sukumar Art Combines
- Release date: 3 December 1993
- Running time: 140 minutes
- Country: India
- Language: Tamil

Rojavai Killathe (transl. Don't pluck the rose) is a 1993 Indian Tamil-language romantic action film directed by Suresh Krissna. A remake of the 1988 Hindi film Tezaab, it stars Arjun and Khushbu with Tiger Prabhakar as the antagonist. The film was released on 3 December 1993.

== Plot ==
Alexander is a henchman who works for a smuggler named Peter, who considers Alexander as his faithful henchman. Peter often confronts his enemy named Ayyanar and orders Alexander to kill Ayyanar's associate Anu. Alexander cannot kill her as he is in love with her and finally shoots her on the shoulder. Anu is admitted to the hospital, where Alexander decides to save her from Peter and Ayyanar.

== Cast ==
- Arjun as Alexander (Duraipandi)
- Khushbu as Anu
- Radha Ravi as Ayyanar
- Tiger Prabhakar as Peter
- Goundamani as David
- Senthil as T.V.Thandavarayan
- Vadivelu
- Sarath Babu as Sathasivam, Alexander's brother
- Vennira Aadai Moorthy
- Arunkumar
- Oru Viral Krishna Rao
- Ra. Sankaran as Somanathan, Anu's father
- Renuka as Sathasivam's wife
- Sharmili as David's wife
- Suryakala
- LIC Narasimhan as a doctor
- Nalinikanth
- Master Robert as Naina

== Soundtrack ==
The soundtrack was composed by Deva, with lyrics by Vairamuthu.

Track listing
No.	Title	Singer(s)	Length
1.	"Arthamulla Pattu"	S. P. Balasubrahmanyam, K. S. Chithra, Baby Sujatha	5:02
2.	"Moodiko Moodiko"	S. P. Balasubrahmanyam, Swarnalatha	4:57
3.	"Nee Oru Pakkam"	S. P. Balasubrahmanyam, K. S. Chithra	4:33
4.	"Onnachi Rendachi"	Swarnalatha	3:57
5.	"Yamuna Nathi Karaiyil"	K. S. Chithra	5:04
Total length:			23:33

== Reception ==
Malini Mannath of The Indian Express wrote, "Director Suresh Krishna's takings are slick and sophisticated. He has used his cinematographer Prakash to good effect. The visuals are crisp and elegant, the locations lush and inviting. But that's all there is to the film, the flashiness." K. Vijiyan of New Straits Times wrote, "Director Suresh Krishna should have concentrated more on building up the story instead of just the stunts".
