= Naan Mahaan Alla (1984 film) =

1984 film by S. P. Muthuraman

- Theatrical release poster
- Directed by: S. P. Muthuraman
- Screenplay by: A. L. Narayanan
- Story by: Subhash Ghai
- Produced by: Rajam Balachander; Pushpa Kandaswamy
- Starring: Rajinikanth; Radha; M. N. Nambiar
- Cinematography: Babu
- Edited by: R.Vittal
- Music by: Ilaiyaraaja
- Production company: Kavithalayaa Productions
- Release date: 14 January 1984
- Running time: 138 minutes
- Country: India
- Language: Tamil

Naan Mahaan Alla (transl. I am not a saint) is a 1984 Indian Tamil-language action thriller film directed by S. P. Muthuraman. The film stars Rajinikanth, Radha and M. N. Nambiar. It is a remake of the Hindi film Vishwanath (1978). The film was released on 14 January 1984, Pongal day and emerged a commercial success.

== Plot ==
Viswanath, a famous lawyer, stays with his widowed mother and physically disabled sister. He sends Jagan, a rich magnate's son and Lokaiya, two criminals to jail on the charge of rape and murder of an innocent girl. Jagan's father GMK uses his influence and starts creating trouble in Viswanath's life. GMK succeeds in getting Viswanath imprisoned on a trumped up charge. His heartbroken mother dies. Once out of jail, Viswanath sets out to punish the culprits when he temporarily loses his eyesight.

== Cast ==
- Rajinikanth as Viswanath
- Radha as Geetha
- M. N. Nambiar as GMK
- V. K.Ramasamy as Dhanakodi
- Cho Ramaswamy as A. R. Chandran/Reddy
- Senthamarai as Eshwaran
- Sathyaraj as Jagan
- Sangili Murugan as Doctor
- Leo Prabhu as Logu
- K. Kannan as Ramesh
- A. R. S. as Saravanan's father
- S. N. Lakshmi as Kalpana's mother
- C. R. Vijayakumari as Viswanath's mother
- Uma Bharani as Shanthi
- Peeli Sivam as Gopinath
- S. R. Veeraraghavan as Judge
- K. Natraj as Henchman of G.M.K
- Oru Viral Krishna Rao as Henchman of G.M.K
- Ennatha Kannaiya as Assistant of A. R. Chandran
- Pasi Narayanan as Chettiyar
- LIC Narasimhan as Eye Doctor
- Kullamani as Group dancer
- Omakuchi Narasimhan as Group dancer

== Production ==
Rajinikanth initially wanted to star in a Tamil remake of the Hindi film Vishwanath (1978) with S. Ravi producing, but as Ravi did not like the film, they decided to collaborate on a different project, eventually choosing to remake the Kannada film Premada Kanike (1976) as Polladhavan (1980). Nonetheless, Vishwanath would still be remade in Tamil, with S. P. Muthuraman directing and Rajinikanth starring. The remake was originally titled Naan Gandhi Alla (transl. I am not Gandhi) but, following a court order, was retitled Naan Mahaan Alla. As a result, the lead character's final dialogue was changed to match the new title, although the lip syncing to the original dialogue "Naan Gandhi Alla" was not changed.

== Soundtrack ==
The music was composed by Ilaiyaraaja and lyrics were written by Vaali.

Title	Singer(s)	Length
"Maalai Soodum Vaelai"	S. P. Balasubrahmanyam, S. Janaki	4:28
"Um Mele Oru Kannu"	Malaysia Vasudevan, S. Janaki	4:08
"Kalyanam Vaipogum"	S.P. Balasubrahmanyam, S. Janaki	4:29

== Critical reception ==
Jayamanmadhan of Kalki felt the first half had the smell of cashews but the second half had old rice grains. Balumani of Anna praised the cast, Babu's cinematography and Ilaiyaraaja's music.
