= LIC Narasimhan =

Indian actor

- Born: Narasimhan; 1940
- Died: 27 October 2011 (aged 71); Chennai, Tamil Nadu, India
- Occupation: Actor
- Years active: 1972–2011

LIC Narasimhan was an Indian character actor who appeared in Tamil-language films.

== Career ==
He has appeared in over 300 films and was also seen on the small screen and in ads. He was working for LIC as an officer, quit his job to take up a career in Tamil cinema, hence was called as LIC Narasimhan. He had acted in many films in the role of doctor, police officer and Judge.

He was seen as Rajinikanth's brother in the hit film Aarilirunthu Arubathu Varai. His comical pronunciation of 'Ninnu Kori Varnam' and 'Paal Irukke Palam Irukkee' to ace comedian Goundamani in the film Themmangu Paattukaaran was very popular among the audience.

== Partial filmography ==
Year	Film	Role	Notes
1972	Aseervatham		
1975	Andharangam	Liquor seller	Uncredited
1979	Aarilirunthu Arubathu Varai	Raghu	
1980	Unnai Solli Kutramillai		
1983	Thudikkum Karangal	Doctor	
1983	Paayum Puli	Hotel manager	
1983	Sivappu Sooriyan	Butcher	
1983	Adutha Varisu	Sundaram	
1984	Naan Mahaan Alla	Eye Doctor	
1985	Raja Rishi	Kanvar Seedan	
1985	Chidambara Rahasiyam	Victim of robbery	
1986	Mr. Bharath	Ravishankar	
1986	Naan Adimai Illai	Rajasekhar's friend	
1986	Nambinar Keduvathillai		
1986	Enakku Nane Needipathi	Advocate	
1986	Aayiram Kannudayaal		
1987	Thirumathi Oru Vegumathi	Police Inspector	
1987	Kavalan Avan Kovalan	Narasimhan	
1987	Mupperum Deviyar	Sivan	
1988	Guru Sishyan	IG Sriram	
1988	Kadarkarai Thaagam	Doctor	
1988	Poovum Puyalum	Advocate	
1988	Uzhaithu Vaazha Vendum	Cyclerickshaw's customer	
1988	Puthiya Vaanam	Samuel	
1989	En Purushanthaan Enakku Mattumthaan	Bank manager	
1989	Poruthathu Pothum	Advocate	
1989	Raja Chinna Roja	Police inspector	
1989	Dharmam Vellum	Doctor	
1989	Vettri Vizhaa	S Ganapathy, Bank Manager	
1990	Pudhu Vasantham	Rangarajan	
1990	Pudhu Padagan		
1990	Ethir Kaatru		
1991	Captain Prabhakaran	Police officer	
1991	Kizhakku Karai		
1992	David Uncle		
1992	Senthamizh Paattu	College Professor	
1993	Ezhai Jaathi	Selection officer	
1993	Thangakkili		
1993	Parvathi Ennai Paradi	College principal	
1993	Rojavai Killathe	Doctor	
1994	Varavu Ettana Selavu Pathana	Vigilante Officer	
1995	Nandhavana Theru	Church Father	
1995	Chakravarthy	Pradeep	
1995	Chandralekha	Ramachandran	
1996	Vaanmathi	Padmavathy's advocate	
1996	Kaalam Maari Pochu	Advocate	
1996	Aavathum Pennale Azhivathum Pennale	Dr. Maari	
1997	Sishya		
1998	Dharma		
1998	En Uyir Nee Thaane	Police commissioner	
1999	Ninaivirukkum Varai	Police officer	
1999	Chinna Durai		
2000	Eazhaiyin Sirippil	Police officer	
2000	Sabhash	Judge	
2001	Looty		
2002	Red	School correspondent	Uncredited
2002	Dhaya	Minister's PA	
2003	Ramachandra	Judge	
2003	Anjaneya	Judge	
2005	Iyer IPS	Judge	
2005	Chanakya	Judge	
2006	Perarasu	Manager	
2007	Sabari	Doctor	
2009	Kannukulle	Doctor	
2012	Medhai		Posthumous release

== Death ==
Narasimhan died on 27 October 2011 of cancer. The actor suffered with cancer for two years and died while he was asleep. His cremation took place at his residence in Valasaravakkam, Chennai.
