= Eazhaiyin Sirippil =

2000 film by K. Subash

- DVD cover
- Directed by: K. Subash
- Written by: P. Kalaimani
- Produced by: Lakshmi Raju
- Starring: Prabhu Deva; Roja; Kausalya; Suvalakshmi
- Cinematography: Ilavarasu
- Edited by: Krishnamoorthy-Siva
- Music by: Deva
- Production company: Sudha Lakshmi Pictures
- Release date: 4 February 2000
- Running time: 146 minutes
- Country: India
- Language: Tamil

Eazhaiyin Sirippil (transl. In the smile of the poor) is a 2000 Indian Tamil-language drama film directed by K. Subash and written by P. Kalaimani. The film stars Prabhu Deva, Roja, Kausalya, and Suvalakshmi, with Indu, Vivek, Nassar, and Ranjith in supporting roles. The soundtrack was composed by Deva, while Ilavarasu handled the cinematography and Laxmi Raju served as editor. The film was released on 4 February 2000.

== Plot ==
Ganesh (Prabhu Deva) has the job of collecting travellers for the lone bus run by Padmavathi Bus Service in the town of Cuddalore. His high-energy people-gathering tactics are considered the reason for the crowds on the bus, and he earns commission for the same from the owner (Nassar) of the bus service. Though Ganesh earns quite enough, he does not buy new things and eats very late and little. No one knows why he is saving so much money. The bus owner was, a young cleaner at Venkatesa bus service, but he fell in love with the owner's daughter and eloped with her. Then after much hardships, he becomes the owner of four buses and very rich, in the same town, while his father in-law's bus company failing. He and his family still maintain no contact with the mother's family.

Ganesh is pursued by lottery ticket seller Saroja (Roja), who dreams of marrying him, though she receives no response from him. A final-year medical student named Kousalya (Kausalya), the daughter of Ganesh's boss, slowly falls for him after seeing his good-heartedness.

Later, Kausalya visits a small suburban area colony for the vaccination campaign, where she is shocked when she sees Ganesh being accused by a mentally ill woman named Thulasi (Suvalakshmi), as being responsible for destroying her life and killing her brother.

Kausalya finds that three years ago, Thulasi's family moved to Cuddalore. However, Thulasi came two days later and was lost in the bus stand as her brother did not come to pick her up. Ganesh saw her and left in her in the area police station for safety at night. There, she is brutally raped by the Inspector. Thulasi berates Ganesh and comes home. She attempts suicide by poison; however, she is saved but loses her mental stability. Her brother, unable to bear her pain, commits suicide, leaving his pregnant wife.

Later, Ganesh saves enough money to treat her, and Thulasi is back to normal.

One day, the bus owner's father-in-law falls very sick, and after much reluctance, he and his wife go to see him. The old man proposes a marriage between Kausalya and his other grandson, to which the bus owner says that he needs two days to decide. That evening, Kousalya is mistakenly locked in her class, and the owner beats Ganesh upon believing that the duo eloped. Though the owner apologises, Ganesh is heartbroken.

Kausalya finds out that Ganesh has organised a marriage and rushes to save her love. She imagines whether Ganesh will marry her, Roja, or Thulasi. However, it is seen that the wedding is for Thulasi, and that Inspector has changed into a good man. When Thulasi's sister-in-law is unable to perform rites as she is a widow, Ganesh marries her, and then the duo performs the rites for Thulasi as brother and sister-in-law.

Later, the bus owner gifts Ganesh a brand new bus and tells him that he is also an owner, to which Ganesh replies that he is still a worker at heart.

== Cast ==
- Prabhu Deva as Ganesan
- Kausalya as Kausalya
- Roja as Saroja
- Suvalakshmi as Thulasi
- Indu as Thulasi's sister-in-law
- Vivek as Arasu
- Ranjith as Doctor
- Nassar as Bus Owner
- Pandu as P. Pandu
- Anu Mohan as Bus Driver
- LIC Narasimhan as Police Officer
- Raj Kapoor as Police Sub-Inspector
- Poovilangu Mohan as Thulasi's brother
- Mayilsamy as Bus Customer
- Kaka Radhakrishnan as Bus owner
- Mohan Raman
- Japan Kumar (special appearance in the song "Yeppa Yeppa Aiyyappa")

== Soundtrack ==
The music was composed by Deva. The song "Karu Karu Karuppaayi" also features in the 2023 Tamil film Leo.

Track listing
No.	Title	Lyrics	Singer(s)	Length
1.	"Karu Karu Karupayi"	K. Subash	Unni Menon, Anuradha Sriram	5:14
2.	"Purave En"	Palani Bharathi	Hariharan, Sujatha Mohan	5:40
3.	"Pachai Kallu Mukutthi"	K. Subash	Mano, Swarnalatha	5:43
4.	"Sakkaravalli"	Na. Muthukumar	Unni Menon	4:53
5.	"Purave En" (Version 2)	Palani Bharathi	Unni Menon, Sujatha Mohan	5:43
6.	"Yeppa Yeppa Aiyyappa"	K. Subash	Mano, Krishnaraj, Prabhu Deva, Vivek, K. Subash	5:05
Total length:				32:18

== Release and reception ==
Eazhaiyin Sirippil released on 4 February 2000. The film was later dubbed and released in Telugu as Muddula Premikudu, financed by G. Aruna Kumari. Malathi Rangarajan of The Hindu wrote, "If director Subaash's aim was to project Prabhu Deva as a versatile actor, he has succeeded... to a certain extent". Tamil Star wrote, "Sudha Lakshmi Films 'Ezhayin Sirippil' gives a long overdue boost to Prabhudeva's morale as an actor. There is nothing flashy, no glittering costumes, no special effects and no dollops of violence. But lots of humour though some of it to please the front benchers. Prabhudeva's role is a departure from his usual ones and his comedy credentials in this film are quite impressive". Malini Mannath of Chennai Online wrote "The narration has a steady tempo and certain freshness in some of the scenes. But then the director attempts to give some twists and turns to the story and soon loses his grip on the script".

Soon after the release of the film, Prabhu Deva and Roja worked on another film title Kalavum Katru Mara directed by Mohanji. Despite completing shoot, the film did not have a theatrical release.
