= Ninaivirukkum Varai =

1999 film by K. Subash

- DVD cover
- Directed by: K. Subash
- Produced by: C. R. Karunanithi; V. Sivakumar
- Starring: Prabhu Deva; Keerthi Reddy
- Cinematography: M. V. Panneerselvam
- Edited by: Krishnamoorthy-Siva
- Music by: Deva
- Production company: Tara Creations
- Release date: 5 February 1999
- Running time: 148 minutes
- Country: India
- Language: Tamil

Ninaivirukkum Varai (transl. Till the last memory) is a 1999 Indian Tamil-language romantic drama film directed by K. Subash. The film stars Prabhu Deva and Keerthi Reddy in the lead roles, while Anand, Ranjith, Vivek, Sujatha and Fathima Babu play supporting roles. The score and soundtrack are composed by Deva with cinematography by M. V. Panneerselvam. The film was released on 5 February 1999.

== Plot ==
Janakiraman alias Johny is a kindhearted slum dweller who is very fond of his mother. Sandhya is a rich girl staying in a nearby locality. Sandhya meets Johny and befriends him and his other friends as well. Johny has big respect for Sandhya as she treats him with respect despite living in a slum. Slowly, friendship blossoms into love for Johny; however, he does not have the courage to speak up to Sandhya, who treats him as her best friend.

Sada is a local baddie living in the same slum who locks horns with Johny most of the time. One day, Sandhya informs Johny that her parents have decided for her to marry Dinesh, who is their family's friend. Johny understands that Sandhya still views him only as a true friend and decides to hide his love. However, Johny learns from Sada that Dinesh is a big-time womaniser and that Sada was working as a pimp for Dinesh. Sada also discloses that both he and Dinesh are infected with HIV/AIDS. Dinesh plans to marry Sandhya despite knowing about his illness.

Now, Johny plans to cancel the wedding and save Sandhya. Johny meets Dinesh and requests him to cancel the wedding, but Dinesh's henchmen beat Johny and also kill Sada. Johny is accused for Sada's death and is arrested by the police. On the day of Sandhya's wedding, Johny escapes from the police and kills Dinesh in the marriage hall. Johny reveals the truth about Dinesh, and Sandhya thanks him for saving her life. Sandhya praises Johny in front of everyone as her true friend who is ready to go to any extent for her well-being. Johny, although feeling like disclosing his love towards her, decides to hide it as he does not want to break her trust. He is then re-arrested.

== Cast ==
- Prabhu Deva as Janakiraman (Johny)
- Keerthi Reddy as Sandhya (voice dubbed by Savitha Reddy)
- Sujatha as Janakiraman's mother
- Vivek as Vinod
- Anand as Dinesh
- Ranjith as Sada
- Kumarimuthu as Astrologer
- Pandu as Sub-inspector
- Dhamu as Janakiraman's friend
- Chaplin Balu as Janakiraman's friend
- Japan Kumar as Janakiraman's friend
- Arun Sarath as Janakiraman's friend
- Soori as Janakiraman's friend (uncredited role)
- Laxmi Rattan as Anand, Sandhya's father
- Mohan Raman as Dinesh's father
- Raviraj as Police inspector
- Fathima Babu as Sandhya's mother
- Anuja as Sippy
- Poovilangu Mohan as Doctor
- LIC Narasimhan as Director general of police
- Amirthalingam as Tea master
- Harikumar as Singer (uncredited role)

== Soundtrack ==
Soundtrack is composed by Deva. The song "Thirupathi Ezhumalai" was reused in the Telugu film Bagunnara (2000) as "Tirumala Tirupati" and the Kannada film Friends (2002) as "Tirupathi Tirumale". The song "Kathadikkuthu Kathadikkuthu" was reused in the Kannada film Colors (2003) as "Kicku Hodithade".

Song	Singers	Lyrics	Length
"Aaya Onnu"	Krishnaraj, Prabhu Deva, Vivek	K. Subash	02:16
"Anbe Nee Mayila"	Unni Menon, Sujatha	Palani Bharathi	05:26
"Oh Vennila"	Hariharan	Palani Bharathi	05:47
"Sandhya Sandhya"	Unnikrishnan	Nandalala	05:14
"Thirupathi Ezhumalai Venkatesa"	Mano, Krishnaraj, Deva	K. Subash	05:28
"Kathadikkuthu Kathadikkuthu"	Sabesh, Krishnaraj	K. Subash	04:16

== Reception ==
A reviewer from Deccan Herald noted, "One must commend the director, screenplay writer, the story person for putting this in. It’s quite amazing — the last half hour or more is about AIDS, in very human images. Keerthi Reddy is probably the nicest thing about this film, together with the actor who plays the goonda". A critic from The New Indian Express wrote, "but in spite of the ingredients being the usual, the film has its moments, thanks largely to a bubbling Prabhu Deva, whose sense of comic timing is superb". D. S. Ramanujam of The Hindu wrote, "Instead of the usual love entanglements between the two, [Subash] comes out with flying colours taking the drama content to good heights through his screenplay and dialogue", adding, "True to the title, some of the sequences will linger long particularly the sea shore segments, where cinematographer Pannerselvam's lens give solid support, catching the emotional clashes between the lead pair. The director also brings to surface the hidden acting talent in Prabhu Deva". Thamarai Manalan of Dinakaran wrote, "The director has treated the first half rather in a playful way! In the second half, he's treated the subject matter in a passionate and epic-like style! He's picturized those scenes, that came to lend a helping hand to him, in a splendid and majestic way". Though the film was heavily ridiculed for its climax, it became a success.
