= Mayabazaar 1995 =

1995 film by Keyaar

- Title card
- Directed by: Keyaar
- Screenplay by: Keyaar
- Story by: Panchu Arunachalam
- Produced by: Meena Panju Arunachalam
- Starring: Ramki; Urvashi
- Cinematography: J. A. Robert
- Edited by: B. Lenin; V. T. Vijayan
- Music by: Ilaiyaraaja
- Production company: P. A. Art Productions
- Release date: 12 August 1995
- Country: India
- Language: Tamil

Mayabazaar 1995 is a 1995 Indian Tamil-language comedy horror film directed by Keyaar and produced by Meena Panchu Arunachalam. The film stars Ramki and Urvashi, with Suvarna Mathew, Visu, Vivek and Ajay Rathnam in supporting roles. It was released on 12 August 1995.

== Plot ==
Suji is the only daughter of billionaire Vishwanathan and plays pranks on the unsuspecting. One such prank she does is conducting an interview for choosing a personal secretary for her father, in which she chooses Ram as the secretary. Vishwanathan's friend Moorthy, manager Ajay, and Swarna want to take over Vishwanathan's property, so Moorthy sets up Raja to marry Suji. However, Suji marries Ram.

Vishwanathan suddenly dies of a heart attack, and Suji goes to Ooty but is killed by Ram, Moorthy, and Ajay. Suji becomes a ghost and decides to take revenge. Suji witnesses Mayamma, a lookalike who works as a fake exorcist and asks her to act as herself. Suji witnesses that the real Ram is kidnapped by the villains and it is Raja whose face was changed as Ram through plastic surgery.

All the baddies suspect that she might not be Suji and finds out that she is Mayamma. In the climax, Ram signs all the documents, brilliantly ties up his look-alike Raja, and gets him burnt. All three villains meet their fate: Swarna turns insane after seeing a skeleton, Suji possesses Moorthy's body and kills Ajay, and Moorthy is hanged.

== Cast ==
- Ramki as Ram/Raja
- Urvashi as Suji/Mayamma
- Suvarna Mathew as Swarna
- Visu as Vishwanathan (Suji's father)
- Vivek as Kuppu
- Kitty as Moorthy
- Ajay Rathnam as Ajay
- Chinni Jayanth
- Kamalesh PK as Fake Raja
- Kutty Ramesh as Ramesh
- Sridharan Sampathkumaran (Auditor Sridhar) as Sridhar
- S. Rajasekar
- Thyagu as Thangam
- Pandu as Police officer
- Junior Balaiah
- Swaminathan as Swaminathan

== Soundtrack ==
The music was composed by Ilaiyaraaja.

Song	Singers	Lyrics
"Oru Oorile"	Urvashi, S. Janaki, S. P. Balasubrahmanyam, Viji Manuel	Panchu Arunachalam
"Birthday Party"	K. S. Chithra, Viji Manuel, Sivakumar, Anuradha	Panchu Arunachalam
"Adada Angu"	Jolly Abraham, Master Easwar, Baby Narmadha, Baby Vaishnavi, Geetha	Panchu Arunachalam
"Adada Oru"	K. S. Chithra	Panchu Arunachalam
"Muthu Muthu"	K. S. Chithra, S. P. Balasubrahmanyam	Panchu Arunachalam
"Naan Poranthathu"	Lekha, Devie Neithiyar, S.Arundhathi, Viji, Geetha, Anuradha, Arunmozhi, Ilaiyaraaja	Ilaiyaraaja

== Reception ==
K. Vijiyan of New Straits Times wrote that the film "has its own charm, definitely because of Urvasi's personal magic". R. P. R. of Kalki criticised the film for lack of originality.
