= R. S. Shivaji =

Indian actor (1956–2023)

- Born: 26 October 1956; Madras, Madras State, India
- Died: 2 September 2023 (aged 66); Chennai, Tamil Nadu, India
- Occupations: Actor; Assistant director; Sound designer, Line producer
- Children: 1
- Father: M.R. Santhanam
- Relatives: Santhana Bharathi (brother)

R. Santhanam Shivaji (26 October 1956 – 2 September 2023) was an Indian actor, who was known for his work in Tamil films. He had often collaborated in films involving Kamal Haasan and Raaj Kamal Films International, working as an assistant director, sound designer and line producer on film projects.

== Early life and career ==
R. S. Shivaji was the son of actor and producer M. R. Santhanam, who worked on films including Ellis R. Dungan's Meera (1945). His brother Santhana Bharathi is also a popular actor and film director, in Tamil cinema.

As an actor, R. S. Shivaji primarily played comedy roles and regularly featured in Kamal Haasan's films in the 1980s and 1990s. His Saar! Neenga Engeyo Poiteenga, sir dialogue from Apoorva Sagodharargal (1989) directed at Janagaraj had been regularly parodied in later Tamil movies. He played important roles in Kolamavu Kokila and Dharala Prabhu as Nayanthara's father and Vivek's assistant, respectively.

== Death ==
Shivaji died due to heart attack during sleep in Chennai on 2 September 2023, at the age of 66.

== Filmography ==
=== Tamil films ===
- Panneer Pushpangal (1981)
- Madhu Malar (1981)
- Vasantham Varum (1981)
- Vadivangal (1981)
- Meendum Oru Kaathal Kathai (1985)
- Vikram (1986)
- Sathya (1988)
- Jeeva (1988)
- Apoorva Sagodharargal (1989)
- Mappillai (1989)
- Michael Madana Kama Rajan (1990)
- Mounam Sammadham (1990)
- My Dear Marthandan (1990)
- Kavalukku Kettikaran (1991)
- Thambikku Oru Pattu (1991)
- Guna (1991)
- Knock-Out (1992; short film)
- Kalaignan (1993)
- Athma (1993)
- Udan Pirappu (1993)
- Magalir Mattum (1994)
- Vietnam Colony (1994)
- Pavithra (1994)
- Chinna Vathiyar (1995)
- Poove Unakkaga (1996)
- Gopura Deepam (1997)
- Thaali Pudhusu (1997)
- Kutty (2001)
- Little John (2001)
- Pammal K. Sambandam (2002)
- En Mana Vaanil (2002)
- Villain (2002)
- Anbe Sivam (2003)
- Kurumbu (2003)
- Aaytha Ezhuthu (2004)
- M. Kumaran Son of Mahalakshmi (2004)
- Paramasivan (2006)
- Kusthi (2006)
- Jayam Kondaan (2008)
- Unnaipol Oruvan (2009)
- Kanden Kadhalai (2009)
- Thambikku Indha Ooru (2010; uncredited)
- Maanja Velu (2010)
- Avan Ivan (2011)
- Maalai Pozhudhin Mayakathilaey (2012)
- Sonna Puriyathu (2013)
- Sutta Kadhai (2013)
- Naveena Saraswathi Sabatham (2013)
- Kalyana Samayal Saadham (2013)
- Urumeen (2015)
- Jil Jung Juk (2016)
- Kanithan (2016)
- Ennul Aayiram (2016)
- Meen Kuzhambum Mann Paanaiyum (2016)
- 8 Thottakkal (2017)
- Vanamagan (2017)
- Sangili Bungili Kadhava Thorae (2017)
- Kolamavu Kokila (2018)
- Puppy (2019)
- God Father (2020)
- Dharala Prabhu (2020)
- Soorarai Pottru (2020)
- Maara (2021)
- Parris Jeyaraj (2021)
- Vanakkam Da Mappilei (2021)
- Thalli Pogathey (2021)
- Payanigal Gavanikkavum (2022)
- Gargi (2022)
- Vattakara (2022)
- Lucky Man (2023)
- Chandramukhi 2 (2023) (released posthumously)
- Naadu (2023) (dual roles) (released posthumously)
- Vasco Da Gama (2024) (released posthumously)

=== Other language films ===
Telugu films

- Jagadeka Veerudu Athiloka Sundari (1990)
- Rajahamsa (1998)
- Eenadu (2009)
- 1000 Abaddalu (2013)

Hindi films

- Chachi 420 (1997)
- White Rainbow (2005)

English films

- Ele, My Friend (1992)
- Faith Beyond Doubt (TBA)

=== Voice artist ===
Year	Film	Role	Actor	Notes
2003	Magic Magic 3D	Thief's assistant	Owen Burke	

=== Television ===
- Kula Vilakku
- Ethanai Konam Ethanai Paarvai
- Anbulla Snehidhiye
- Maruthani
- Vallamai Tharayo
- Poova Thalaya
- Om Kali Jai Kali

=== Web series ===
Year	Program Name	Role	Network	Notes
2020	Time Enna Boss	Roon Laham	Amazon Prime Video	
2024	Inspector Rishi	Entomologist	Amazon Prime Video	
