= White rainbow =

White rainbow may refer to:

- Moonbow, a rainbow produced by light reflected from the Moon rather than from direct sunlight
- Fog bow, a rainbow produced by the tiny water droplets of fog, which has much weaker colors and can appear white
- the stage name of musician Adam Forkner
- White Rainbow, 2005 Indian Hindi-English film about widows, starring Sonali Kulkarni
