= Padai Veetu Amman =

- VCD cover
- Directed by: Pugazhmani
- Written by: Pugazhmani
- Starring: Meena; Ramki; Devayani; Ravali
- Cinematography: Baby Philips
- Edited by: R. K. Baburaj
- Music by: S. A. Rajkumar
- Production company: Televista Digitals Limited
- Release date: 4 November 2002
- Running time: 145 minutes
- Country: India
- Language: Tamil

Padai Veetu Amman is a 2002 Indian Tamil-language devotional film directed by Pugazhmani. The film stars Meena, Ramki, Devayani and Ravali. It was released on 4 November 2002.

== Plot ==
During the goddess Padaiveedu Amman's religious parade, her idol goes missing. At the same time, Chamundi, a priestess from the Muthu Maariamman Temple in a nearby village, is brutally murdered by hooligans the night before her wedding. Witnessing the atrocity, Padaiveedu Amman vows to avenge her death.

In a brief flashback, we learn that Chamundi lives with her brother, Sadaiyandi, a Pambai (cylindrical drum) player. The humble siblings depend on the villagers for food and shelter. In the same village lives Periya Ayya, a powerful man with his wife and their spoiled, atheist daughter, Rathna, who despises both the villagers and Chamundi.

Sankar, a forest officer, falls for Chamundi and proposes to her. Though initially committed to her life as a priestess, Chamundi agrees to marry Sankar after Sadaiyandi falsely claims the goddess has approved the union.

Rathna, overhearing villagers praising Chamundi while criticizing her, becomes jealous. Determined to stop the wedding, she sets her sights on marrying Sankar herself. Chamundi prays to Muthu Maariamman to remain in her abode to protect the village, which renders the goddess’s powers inactive. Unable to intervene, the goddess watches helplessly.

Periya Ayya, who knows the temple must be shut down to access a treasure buried beneath a sacred snake mound, plots to kill Chamundi and marry Rathna to Sankar on the same day. Chamundi is murdered, and the blame is pinned on a man-eating tiger. Devastated, Sadaiyandi blames the goddess for allowing Chamundi, who was meant to remain a virgin, to be killed after agreeing to marry.

In the present, Padaiveedu Amman assumes the role of priestess at the Muthu Maariamman Temple, angering Periya Ayya. He teams up with Kaathavarayan, a demonic mongoose worshipper, to steal the hidden treasure. Meanwhile, Chamundi's spirit begs the goddess to reunite her with Sankar in the spirit realm. Taking the form of a tigress, Padaiveedu Amman kills those responsible for Chamundi’s death. Sadaiyandi repents for having doubted the goddess. Rathna, now reformed, begs the goddess to save her husband’s life.

Kaathavarayan summons a monstrous demon mongoose to attack the snake mound. Periya Ayya attempts to run over the villagers with his car. Both are slain by the goddess.

Chamundi’s spirit forgives Rathna and requests that Sankar be allowed to live with his wife. In the end, Rathna lives happily with Sankar, while Chamundi’s spirit finds salvation. Goddess's missing idol returns back to her temple.

== Cast ==
- Meena as Goddess Padai Veetu Amman (Renuka Devi) and Goddess Muthu Mariamman
- Ramki as Forest officer Shankar
- Devayani as Chamundi
- Ravali as Rathna
- Senthil as Sadaiyaandi
- Vinu Chakravarthy as Kaathavaraayan
- Nizhalgal Ravi as Rathna's father
- P. R. Varalakshmi as Shankar's Mother
- K. R. Vatsala as Bhavani, Rathna's Mother
- Baby Akshaya as Meenakshi
- Vellai Subbaiah as Priest
- Bayilvan Ranganathan as Malaiyandi
- Suryakanth

== Production ==
Vinu Chakravarthy originally refused to portray the role of an evil sorcerer as he was a devotee of goddess but after obtaining permission from his spiritual guru he relented with a condition that his face should not be "shown decrying the Goddess, even if it is only in acting".

== Soundtrack ==
Lyrics were written by Kalidasan, Kamakodiyan, Kirithaya and Rama Narayanan.

Song	Singers	Lyrics	Length
Adi Muthu Muthu Maari	Swarnalatha	Rama Narayanan	04:41
Paambe Adi Naaga Paambe	Swarnalatha	Kamakodiyan	05:18
Pathu Ooraiyum	K. S. Chitra	Kalidasan	05:22
Udukkai Piranthathu	K. S. Chithra, Keerthi	Kalidasan	05:09
Vaadi Amma Vaadi	Baby Vaishali	Kirithiya	04:15

== Release and reception ==
The film was released on 4 November 2002 on Diwali. Malini Mannath wrote for Chennai Online, "Fit for consumption, only for the suburban or rural audience!". S. R. Ashok Kumar wrote for The Hindu, "Good digital effects certainly make one sit through the entire film and Padai Veettu Amman has succeeded in it partially".
