= S. Rajasekar =

Indian film director, cinematographer, and actor (1957–2019)

- Born: 19 August 1957
- Died: 8 September 2019 (aged 62); Chennai
- Occupations: Director; Cinematographer; Screenwriter
- Years active: 1979–2019
- Spouse: Tara Begam (m. 1990–2019)

S. Rajasekar (19 August 1957 – 8 September 2019) was an Indian cinematographer, film director, and actor. He collaborated with director Robert under the name Robert–Rajasekar.

== Career ==
Rajasekar's first break happened with Kudisai, followed by Oru Thalai Ragam as he worked as cinematographer along with Robert Ashirwatham. Bharathiraja's Nizhalgal provided him the break as a lead actor. He has co-directed many successful films along with Robert as a director duo known as Robert–Rajasekar.

Later, he acted in many TV serials, notably Thendral, Saravanan Meenatchi, Valli, and Sathya. His role in Saravanan Meenatchi was liked by many, as he portrayed a comedic, friendly dad with ease. This made him a recognizable face among the new generation audience.

== Personal life ==
Rajasekar married Tara Begam in 1990. The couple had no children.

== Death ==
On 8 September 2019, Rajasekar died of an illness while he was getting treated at Ramachandra Hospital in Chennai. He was 62 years old, and a resident of Valasaravakkam, Chennai.

== Partial filmography ==
=== As director duo ===
Films

- Palaivana Solai (1981)
- Kalyanakkaalam (1982)
- Dhooram Adhighamillai (1983)
- Chinna Poove Mella Pesu (1987)
- Paravaigal Palavitham (1988)
- Manasukkul Mathappu (1988)

Television

- Naanal (2008) (up to 50 Episodes)

=== As actor ===
Films

- Nizhalgal (1980)
- Poo Manam (1989)
- Gnana Paravai (1991)
- Senbaga Thottam (1992)
- Chembaruthi (1992) (Guest Appearance)
- Ilaya Ragam (1995)
- Thullatha Manamum Thullum (1999)
- Vallarasu (2000)
- Narasimha (2001) as a Doctor who attends Narasimha
- Poovellam Un Vaasam (2001)
- Thamizhan (2002) as Moorthy, leader of employees union
- Amudhae (2005)
- Don Chera (2006)
- Theekuchi (2008)
- Thira (2013)
- Saravanan Irukka Bayamaen (2017)

Television

- Akshaya – Sun TV (1998–1999)
- Pushpanjali – Sun TV (2000–2001)
- Roja– Jaya TV (2004–2007) as Rajasekhar, Mahesh's father
- My Dear Bootham – Sun TV (2004–2007) Gowtham/Gowri's father
- Kasthuri – Sun TV (2007–2010)
- Meera – Vijay TV (2010)
- Vasantham – Sun TV (2010–2011)
- Thendral – Sun TV (2009–2014)
- Saravanan Meenatchi – Vijay TV (2011–2018)
- Valli – Sun TV (2015–2019)
- Mappillai – Vijay TV (2017–2018)
- Sathya – Zee Tamil (2019)

== Awards ==
- Kalaimamani Award - 2011
