= Paravaigal Palavitham =

- Theatrical release poster
- Directed by: Robert–Rajasekar
- Screenplay by: Robert–Rajasekar
- Story by: S. Rajasekar
- Produced by: S. K. Rajagopal
- Starring: Ramki; Nirosha
- Cinematography: Robert–Rajasekar
- Edited by: R. T. Annadurai
- Music by: Songs: S. A. Rajkumar; Score: Vidyasagar
- Production company: Ess Kay Film Combines
- Distributed by: K. R. Enterprises
- Release date: 2 December 1988
- Country: India
- Language: Tamil

Paravaigal Palavitham (transl. Birds of different sorts) is a 1988 Indian Tamil-language masala film directed by Robert–Rajasekar. The film stars Ramki and Nirosha. It was released on 2 December 1988. The film was remade in Telugu as Chinnari Sneham.

== Plot ==
A group of friends in college dream of achieving success in life. However, each one of them faces a different set of problems with employment, family or finance. This results in most of them leading an unhappy and tragic life showing the idealistic and dreamy college life is nowhere in touch with cruel and cold day-to-day reality with Janaki becoming a prostitute, Sekar becoming a gangster, Shiva becoming a marriage broker where he gets to make no use of his education, Rekha unable to find a groom due to her outspoken nature and high education, and Raja being thrown out of job constantly due to his straightforwardness. Sekar and Janaki user their connections with the dark underbelly of life and fix the problem of all others and dying in the end, as a couple.

== Cast ==
- Ramki as Sekar
- Nirosha as Janaki
- Janagaraj as Shiva
- Tara as Rekha
- Nassar as Raja
- Sabitha Anand as Geetha
- Thyagu as Ramesh
- V. K. Ramasamy as Shiva's father
- Kumarimuthu
- Gandhimathi as Sekar's mother

== Production ==
Besides directing, Robert–Rajasekar also handled the cinematography. The film was launched on Prasad recording studios on July 1987 along with the song recording of "Manam Paada". The film saw the cast and crew of Chinna Poove Mella Pesu (1987) teaming up for the second time. A fight sequence of Ramki was shot at Thiruvallikeni, Chennai.

== Soundtrack ==
The music was composed by S. A. Rajkumar, who also wrote the lyrics.

Song	Singers
"Manam Padida"	Swarnalatha, Mano, Dinesh
"Naan Kadanthu"	S. P. Balasubrahmanyam
"Saalaiyoram Pogum"	Malaysia Vasudevan
"Vaanathila Koodu"	Malaysia Vasudevan
"Yaar Endru"	S. P. Sailaja, Malaysia Vasudevan

== Release and reception ==
Paravaigal Palavitham was released on 2 December 1988. The following week, The Indian Express panned the film and said, "It's only Janagaraj's excellent histrionics that comes as a saving grace".
