= Oru Iniya Udhayam =

- Poster
- Directed by: R. Selvam
- Story by: B. Jayaseelan
- Produced by: G. Pandu
- Starring: Vijayakanth; Amala; V. K. Ramasamy; Vijayakumar
- Cinematography: Dinesh Babu
- Edited by: R. Devarajan
- Music by: Manoj–Gyan
- Production company: Pandu Cine Arts
- Release date: 13 December 1986
- Running time: 128 minutes
- Country: India
- Language: Tamil

Oru Iniya Udhayam (transl. A Good Morning) is a 1986 Indian Tamil-language romantic action film, directed by R. Selvam. The film stars Vijayakanth, Amala, V. K. Ramasamy and Vijayakumar. It was released on 13 December 1986.

== Plot ==
Sakthivel, a village-based ruffian, is recruited by Sekar for a mission and is taught martial arts. Meanwhile, Shakthi falls in love with Anju, but realises that his mission is linked to her.

== Cast ==
- Vijayakanth as Sakthivel
- Amala as Anju
- V. K. Ramasamy as Jithu
- Vijayakumar as Sekar
- Sivachandran as Siva
- Vennira Aadai Moorthy as Anju's uncle
- Janagaraj as Thavudu
- Super Subbarayan as Subbu
- Thyagu as Tea shop owner
- Kumarimuthu as Tea shop's customer
- Kamala Kamesh as Thavudu's mother
- Major Sundarrajan as Selvam (guest appearance)
- Prabhu Deva as side dancer

== Production ==
Oru Iniya Udhayam was directed by R. Selvam and produced by Pandu Cine Arts.

== Soundtrack ==
The soundtrack was composed by Manoj–Gyan.

Track listing
No.	Title	Lyrics	Singer(s)	Length
1.	"Aaththaa"	M. G. Vallabhan	S. P. Balasubrahmanyam
2.	"Pottu Vaiththa Nila"	Vairamuthu	S. Janaki
3.	"Madiyinil Idam"	M. G. Vallabhan	S. P. Balasubrahmanyam, Vani Jairam
4.	"Aahaayam"	Vairamuthu	S. P. Balasubrahmanyam, S. Janaki
5.	"Yaar Azhaiththatho"	Vaali	S. Janaki
6.	"Aaththaa" (Instrumental)	—	—

== Reception ==
On 19 December 1986, The Indian Express wrote that while the film had a good start, many scenes looked like they were executed with "lack of imagination", leading to "clichéd situations and loud acting (especially by Sivachandran)". Jayamanmadhan of Kalki panned the film for its story and lack of logic. Balumani of Anna praised the acting of Vijayakanth, Sivachandran and other actors except for Amala and also praised Janagaraj's humour, Dinesh Babu's cinematography and Manoj-Gyan's music and noted despite excellent music, excellent actors and excellent cinematography, there is a slight lapse in the pace from scene to scene, which makes you squirm in your seat at some points.
