= Thottil Kuzhandhai =

- Title card
- Directed by: S. P. Muthuraman
- Written by: Panchu Arunachalam
- Produced by: Ve. Vaduganathan; Valampuri Muthu
- Starring: Ramki; Ranjitha
- Cinematography: T. S. Vinayagam
- Edited by: R. Vittal
- Music by: Adithyan
- Production company: Meena Movies
- Release date: 24 February 1995
- Running time: 150 minutes
- Country: India
- Language: Tamil

Thottil Kuzhandhai (pronounced [toʈʈil kuɻan̪ðaɪ] transl. Cradle child) is a 1995 Indian Tamil-language crime film directed by S. P. Muthuraman. The film stars Ramki and Ranjitha, with Anandaraj, Janagaraj, Vinu Chakravarthy, Kovai Sarala, Vadivukkarasi, Vivek and Karan playing supporting roles. It was released on 24 February 1995, and failed at the box office. The film notably was the last directorial venture of Muthuraman, and was a propaganda film promoting the Tamil Nadu government's thottil kuzhandhai scheme to prevent female infanticide.

== Plot ==
The film begins with the abandonment of a baby girl in a baby hatch and that baby is brought up in a government orphanage. Now, Raani is a gifted woman and she is proud of the orphanage. She then goes to a renowned college. There, Raani meets the village boy Pitchai and she changes him into a perfect city dweller, they slowly become best friends. After their studies, Pitchai and Raani fall in love. Raani becomes a Sub-inspector of police while Pitchai becomes a district collector. Soon, they have to face the smuggler Rajarathnam and his son Murali. What transpires later forms the crux of the story.

== Cast ==
- Ramki as Pitchai
- Ranjitha as Raani
- Anandaraj as Rajarathnam
- Janagaraj as Muthu
- Vinu Chakravarthy as Sudalai, Pitchai's father
- Kovai Sarala as Sarala
- Vadivukkarasi
- Vivek
- Karan as Murali
- Ganeshkar as Ganesh
- Vellai Subbaiah
- Silk Smitha

== Soundtrack ==
The music was composed by Adithyan, with lyrics written by Panchu Arunachalam.

Song	Singer(s)	Duration
"Annaiyumindri Thantahiyumindri"	Minmini	4:35
"Ennathotta Poongkatre"	Sangeetha Sajith	5:22
"Kannala Valai Veesu"	Adithyan, Sangeetha Sajith	4:55
"Manathile Or Kanavu"	P. Unnikrishnan, Lalitha Sagari	4:22
"Ungal Varavaal"	Adithyan, Sangeetha Sajith	4:53
