= Pass Mark =

1993 film directed by V. Balakrishnan

- Poster
- Directed by: V. Balakrishnan
- Written by: V. Balakrishnan
- Produced by: P. Kannappan; R. Dhanraj; R. Srinivasan
- Starring: Ramki; Kasthuri; Nandhini
- Cinematography: P. S. Nivas
- Edited by: R. D. Shekar
- Music by: Deva
- Production company: Sri Lakshmi Balaji Films
- Release date: 23 July 1993
- Country: India
- Language: Tamil

Pass Mark is a 1993 Indian Tamil-language comedy film written and directed by V. Balakrishnan. The film stars Ramki and Kasthuri, while Janagaraj, Vivek, and S. S. Chandran appear in supporting roles. It was released on 23 July 1993.

== Plot ==
Murali is an unemployed prankster that will take any bet for money regardless of any problems it may cause for those around him. He pretends to be dead and a madman for bets and this causes great distress to his parents. They would rather he gets an actual job and show some responsibility. Murali becomes a rickshaw driver but is soon drawn back into his old habits. Selvam has a liquor shop and wants to marry Shanthi but her family-and Shanthi herself- is fiercely opposed to this. Her marriage is arranged with someone else. Selvam brings Murali to the wedding and bets that the latter should steal the thaali and return it before anyone notices. Murali agrees and steals the thaali but is drugged by Selvam before he can return it. The deeply superstitious groom calls off the wedding. Murali is guilt-ridden and determined to help Shanthi. Murali's parents want him to marry Kalpana. She's also interested in Murali but he's drawn to Shanthi. Murali must face off against Selvam and his parents in his quest to help Shanthi.

== Cast ==
- Ramki as Murali
- Kasthuri as Shanthi
- Nandhini as Kalpana
- Ooha in a special appearance
- S. S. Chandran as Murali's dad
- Sachu as Sarasu
- Vadivukkarasi
- Vennira Aadai Moorthy
- Vasu Vikram as Selvam
- Janagaraj
- Vivek
- King Kong
- Omakuchi Narasimhan
- Oru Viral Krishna Rao
- Thideer Kannaiah
- Kodukkapuli Selvaraj
- Pasi Narayanan
- Bayilvan Ranganathan
- Ramesh Khanna

== Production ==
Pass Mark marked the directorial debut of K. Balakrishnan who earlier assisted Pandiarajan.

== Soundtrack ==
The music was composed by Deva, with lyrics written by Vairamuthu.

| Song | Singer(s) | Duration |
|---|---|---|
| "Un Punagai Pothumadi" | S. P. Balasubrahmanyam, K. S. Chithra | 4:48 |
| "Mamoi Pattikattu Kutti" | S. Janaki | 4:43 |
| "Penne Nee Soodum" | K. J. Yesudas | 4:11 |
| "Vaanam Namathu" | S. P. Balasubrahmanyam | 4:22 |
| "Yerikayya Yerikayya" | K. S. Chithra, Mano | 4:35 |

== Reception ==
K. Vijiyan of New Straits Times called it "a story with a slight difference" and "serves as a way of good spending 2½ hours." C. R. K. of Kalki praised the performances of the star cast.
