= Pakkathu Veettu Roja =

- Title card
- Directed by: M. Bhaskar
- Written by: Panasai Maniam
- Produced by: Kalaignanam
- Starring: Karthik; Radha
- Cinematography: C. S. Ravibabu
- Edited by: M. Vellaichamy
- Music by: Shankar–Ganesh
- Production company: Bhairavi Films
- Release date: 2 September 1982
- Country: India
- Language: Tamil

Pakkathu Veettu Roja (transl. The rose next door) is a 1982 Indian Tamil-language comedy film directed by M. Bhaskar, starring Karthik and Radha. The film was released on 2 September 1982.

== Cast ==
- Karthik
- Radha
- Goundamani
- Senthil
- Krishna Rao
- Janagaraj
- S. S. Chandran
- Shawnawaz
- Thyagu
- Manorama
- Nazreen
- Rani Padmini
- Sathisri

== Soundtrack ==
The soundtrack was composed by Shankar–Ganesh.

Track listing
No.	Title	Lyrics	Singer(s)	Length
1.	"Vaadi Sevatha"	Pulamaipithan	Malaysia Vasudevan
2.	"Osibisa Osai Ethu"	Vaali_(poet)	Vani Jairam
3.	"Idhu Enna"	Vaali_(poet)	Vani Jairam
4.	"Entha Kangal"	Pulamaipithan	P. Jayachandran
5.	"Thanni Illana"		Malaysia Vasudevan
