= Ele, My Friend =

- Poster
- Directed by: Dharan Mandrayar
- Written by: Dharan Mandrayar
- Produced by: Dharan Mandrayar
- Starring: Jacob Paul Guzman; Ganesh
- Cinematography: Arnie Sirlin
- Edited by: B. Lenin; V. T. Vijayan
- Music by: Barry Phillips
- Production company: Dharlin Entertainment
- Distributed by: Prabhu Movies
- Release date: 1992
- Running time: 90 minutes
- Countries: India; United Kingdom
- Language: English

Ele, My Friend is a 1992 English-language children's film written, produced, and directed by Dharan Mandrayar. The film stars Jacob Paul Guzman and an elephant named Ganesh. The film, an Indo-British co-production, revolves around a bond between a 10-year old named Charles and an elephant, which he names Ele. The film is set in 1924.

== Cast ==
- Jacob Paul Guzman as Charles
- Ganesh as Ele
- Gazan Khan as Jaggu
- R. S. Shivaji as Ahmed
- Terry Nichelson as Charles Sr.
- Queen as Ele's mother
- Katherine Byers as Mary
- Santhana Bharathi as Kallar Village Chief
- Amjad Khan as Omar (special appearance)
- Prabhu (special appearance)

== Production ==
Dharan Mandrayar, a nephew of actor Sivaji Ganesan, studied in India and later in the United States. He forayed into films after being encouraged by his wife, Linda. The film was shot in South India and was produced by Dharan and Linda Mandrayar's Dharlin Entertainment. Filming began on 3 February 1992, and trained elephants had to be brought into the wildlife refuge in trailers. Mandrayar had Ele hover his foot above him to convince the film crew that the elephant could be trusted. While filming, a bull (male) elephant charged the sets and the crew and trained elephants ran to safety. The scene where Ele falls into a pit was shot in one take.

== Release ==
The film was released in Germany and Italy as Mein Freund, der kleine Elefant and Il Mio Amico Elé, respectively. The film was made available on DVD in 2008.

== Reception ==
A critic from Movie Guide opined that "Ele, My Friend is a rare, gentle movie that will satisfy the viewer". Regarding the German version, a critic from Kinder Film Welt criticised several aspects of the film including the acting, music, and sound.

== Accolades ==
The film won the Best Picture for Environment and Quality of Life Award in Bellinzona, Switzerland.
