= Thaali Pudhusu =

- Title card
- Directed by: Keyaar
- Written by: Prasanna Kumar (dialogues)
- Screenplay by: Keyaar
- Story by: E. V. V. Satyanarayana
- Produced by: V. Saibabu; T. Usharaaz; C. H. Shekhar; S. Parthasarathy
- Starring: Ramki; Suresh; Khushbu
- Cinematography: B. Logesh
- Edited by: R. T. Annadurai
- Music by: Raj; Vidyasagar
- Production company: Perumal Productions
- Release date: 10 April 1997
- Running time: 130 minutes
- Country: India
- Language: Tamil

Thaali Pudhusu (transl. New thaali) is a 1997 Indian Tamil-language drama film, directed by Keyaar, starring Ramki, Suresh and Khushbu. It was released on 10 April 1997.

== Plot ==
Arun falls in love at first sight with a bank cashier Seetha. Arun begins to follow her everywhere. Seetha refuses his love and tells him her past.

In the past, Seetha was from a middle-class family. Seetha's brother-in-law was a jobless son-in-law and lived with them. Balu was a bank manager and falls in love with Seetha. Mani, Balu's father, a miser, looked for a rich daughter-in-law. Finally, Balu married Seetha and the same day, Balu died in a crossfire. So Mani refused to keep Seetha in his house. Later, without money, Mani begged Seetha to come with him and she took her late husband's job. Seetha's brother-in-law took his wife's thaali and tied the thaali to Seetha. She immediately removed the thaali.

Arun decides to marry her despite her past. The court cancels the marriage between Seetha and her brother-in-law. Seetha's sister beats her husband in the spinal cord to save Seetha's marriage. In the end, Arun and Seetha get married.

== Cast ==
- Ramki as Arun
- Suresh as Balu
- Khushbu as Seetha
- Rajesh as Seetha's father
- Thalaivasal Vijay as Seetha's brother-in-law
- Manivannan as Mani, Balu's father
- Senthil as 'Leg' Dada
- Vennira Aadai Moorthy as a marriage broker
- Sangeetha as Lakshmi, Seetha's mother
- Kalaranjini as Kala, Seetha's sister
- Pandu
- Madhan Bob
- R. S. Shivaji
- Ennatha Kannaiya
- Omakuchi Narasimhan
- Sudha as Balu's father
- Manager Cheena
- Varna
- Sriji
- Natarajan
- Karuppu Subbiah
- Vellai Subbaiah
- Pasi Narayanan
- Marthandan
- MLA Thangaraj
- Chelladurai

== Soundtrack ==
The music was composed by Vidyasagar and Raj and lyrics were written by Vaasan. The soundtrack, released in 1997, has five tracks but the film featured only two tracks.

Song	Singer(s)	Duration
"Putham Pudhu"	Mano, Swarnalatha, Sunitha	4:57
"Sirage Illatha Poonkuruvi"	Harish Raghavendra, Sujatha Mohan	5:07
"Pournami Velayile"	Mano, Swarnalatha	
Kaadhal Vizha	Mano, Swarnalatha	
Mottu Thirakkum	Mano, Sunitha	

== Reception ==
The film was not released theatrically in Malaysia, only via home video. K. N. Vijiyan from New Straits Times appreciated it for its story, cast performances and direction. He named it the sixth best Tamil film of 1997. The film failed at box-office.
