= Thyagu (actor) =

Indian actor

- Born: Thyagarajan; 5 February 1958 (age 68)
- Other name: Comedy Thiyagu
- Occupation: Actor
- Years active: 1980-2018
- Relatives: Kumbakonam Rajamanickam Pillai (grandfather)
- Awards: Kalaimamani Award (1998)

Thyagu (born 5 February 1958) is an Indian actor and comedian who appears in Tamil films. He is the grandson of violinist Kumbakonam Rajamanickam Pillai.

== Career ==
Beginning as a protagonist, Thyagu played roles in Oru Thalai Ragam and Palaivana Solai, before playing antagonistic roles in the late 1980s and early 1990s. In the 2000s, he often formed an association with Vadivelu and would appear in a few scenes in films he had signed for, occasionally portraying comedy roles. His recent work includes roles in Kuselan as well as a politician in the Singam series.

In 2011, Thyagu quit the DMK political party, whom he had been associated with for twenty-eight years. Soon after his split, he lamented the leader Karunanidhi's broken promise of honouring Thyagu's grandfather with a postage stamp as a reason for his departure.

== Personal life ==
His son Sarang Thyagu is an director who made his directorial debut with Aaromaley (2025).

== Awards ==
- Kalaimamani Award - 1998

== Selected filmography ==
Year	Film	Role	Notes
1980	Oru Thalai Ragam		
1981	Palaivana Solai	Siva	
1982	Kalyana Kalam		
1982	Manjal Nila	Suresh	
1982	Chinna Marumagal		
1982	Neram Vandhachu		
1982	Pakkathu Veetu Roja	Thyagu	
1982	Aagaya Gangai	Gopal	
1985	Annai Bhoomi 3D	Shankar	
1985	Unakkaga Oru Roja		
1985	Idaya Kovil	Suresh's friend	
1986	Mythili Ennai Kaathali		
1986	Uyire Unakkaga	Balu's friend	
1986	Jothi Malar		
1986	Aayiram Pookkal Malarattum		
1986	Oomai Vizhigal	Velu	
1986	Vidinja Kalyanam		
1986	Palaivana Rojakkal		
1986	Oru Iniya Udhayam		
1987	Velicham		
1987	Premaloka	Ravi's friend	Kannada film; simultaneously shot in Tamil as Paruva Ragam
1987	Muthukkal Moondru		
1987	Ananda Aradhanai		
1987	Veeran Veluthambi		
1987	Cooliekkaran		
1987	Ini Oru Sudhanthiram		
1987	Jallikattu		
1987	Theertha Karaiyinile		
1987	Pasam Oru Vesam		
1988	Annanagar Mudhal Theru		
1988	En Thangai Kalyani		
1988	Therkathi Kallan		
1988	Oorai Therinjikitten		
1988	Paasa Paravaigal		
1988	Rayilukku Neramachu		
1988	Poonthotta Kaavalkaaran		
1988	Nallavan	Peter	
1988	Paravaigal Palavitham	Ramesh	
1988	Sahadevan Mahadevan	Miloma smuggler	
1989	Poo Manam		
1989	En Purushanthaan Enakku Mattumthaan		
1989	Thangamani Rangamani		
1989	Siva		
1989	Thangamana Purushan		
1989	Shondham 16		
1989	Pudhu Mappillai		
1989	Samsara Sangeetham	Thyagu	
1989	Manidhan Marivittan		
1989	Thaaya Thaarama		
1989	Yogam Raja Yogam		
1989	Vetri Vizha		
1989	Thalaippu Seithigal		
1990	Panakkaran		
1990	Kizhakku Vasal		
1990	Seetha Geetha		
1990	Sirayil Pootha Chinna Malar		
1990	My Dear Marthandan		
1990	Engitta Mothathay		
1990	Sirayil Sila Raagangal	Saamy	
1990	Mallu Vetti Minor	Pattabhi	
1991	Eeramana Rojave		
1991	Thaiyalkaran		
1991	Vetri Padigal		
1991	Maanagara Kaaval	MP, Vannai Varadhan	
1991	Iravu Sooriyan		
1991	Kurumbukkaran		
1991	Vaithegi Vanthachu		
1991	Rasathi Varum Naal	Kabali	
1992	Nadodi Pattukkaran	Periya Madurai	
1992	Chinna Marumagal		
1992	Kizhakku Veedhi		
1992	Pondatti Rajyam		
1993	Ezhai Jaathi	MLA	
1993	Suriyan Chandiran		
1993	Enga Thambi	K.K	
1993	Thanga Pappa	Swamy	
1993	Sakkarai Devan	Ponnambalam	
1993	Maravan		
1993	Enga Muthalali	Nenjampan	
1993	Purusha Lakshanam		
1993	Kathirukka Neramillai	Raju's friend	
1994	Amaidhi Padai		
1994	Rajakumaran	Thangaraj	
1994	Ravanan		
1994	Seeman		
1994	Vietnam Colony		
1994	En Rajangam		
1994	Kanmani		
1994	Vaa Magale Vaa	Amarnath	
1994	Vanaja Girija		
1995	Engirundho Vandhan	Sundaram's son	
1995	Kattumarakaran		
1995	Lucky Man	Gopikrishna's friend	
1995	Avatharam		
1995	Rani Maharani		
1995	Thedi Vandha Raasa		
1995	Mayabazaar		
1995	Raasaiyya		
1995	Mr. Madras		
1995	Seethanam		
1996	Thayagam		
1996	Irattai Roja		
1996	Enakkoru Magan Pirappan	Vargis	
1996	Andha Naal	Kandu	
1996	Senathipathi		
1996	Purushan Pondatti		
1997	Dhinamum Ennai Gavani	Ganesan	
1997	Sishya		
1997	Pongalo Pongal	Anja Nenjam	
1997	Paththini		
1997	Arasiyal	Thiruvasagam	
1998	Color Kanavugal		
1998	Harichandra	General Manager	
1998	Golmaal		
1998	Ellame En Pondattithaan	Azhagu Sundari	
1998	En Uyir Nee Thaane	Police inspector	
1998	Kumbakonam Gopalu		
1999	Chinna Durai		
1999	Viralukketha Veekkam	Karuppaiyya	
1999	Sangamam		
1999	Anbulla Kadhalukku	Police inspector	
2000	Kadhal Rojavae		
2000	Kakkai Siraginilae		
2000	Vallarasu	R. Kandasamy	
2000	Sandhitha Velai		
2000	Koodi Vazhnthal Kodi Nanmai	Veerapandi	
2000	Simmasanam	Annapoorani's brother	
2000	Kuberan	Kuberan's brother-in-law	
2000	Seenu	Seenu's uncle	
2000	Vanna Thamizh Pattu	Ponnusamy	
2001	Vaanchinathan	Narayanan	
2001	Engalukkum Kaalam Varum		
2001	Sri Raja Rajeshwari		
2001	Krishna Krishna		
2001	Narasimha		
2001	Samuthiram	Priya's father	
2001	Maayan		
2001	Thavasi	Sankarapandi's henchman	
2002	Alli Arjuna		
2002	Gemini	Sammandham	
2002	Ezhumalai	Ezhumalai's elder brother	
2002	Thenkasi Pattanam		
2002	Shree		
2003	Chokka Thangam		
2003	Saamy	MLA Aiyarettu Sundaram	
2003	Punnagai Poove	Moneylender	
2003	Thennavan		
2004	Engal Anna	Durairaj’s father	
2004	Jana	Balu	
2004	Amma Appa Chellam	Pannaiyar	
2004	Aai	Inspector Vavval Pandi	
2004	Meesai Madhavan	Paramaguru	
2004	Jananam	MD	
2005	Mannin Maindhan	Police Constable	
2005	Chandramukhi	Kumar	
2005	6'2		
2005	Daas		
2005	Meesai Madhavan		
2005	Kundakka Mandakka		
2006	Imsai Arasan 23m Pulikesi	Vallavarayan	
2007	Marudhamalai	Police Inspector	
2008	Indiralohathil Na Azhagappan		
2008	Vaitheeswaran		
2008	Kuselan		
2009	Sirithal Rasipen	Vikramadithyan	
2009	Vedigundu Murugesan		
2009	Azhagar Malai		
2010	Singam	Harbour Shanmugam	
2010	Thillalangadi	Minister	
2011	Mappillai	Chinna's assistant	
2013	Pathayeram Kodi	Professor	
2013	Singam 2	Harbour Shanmugam	
2014	Adhu Vera Idhu Vera	Police Inspector	
2015	Pulan Visaranai 2		
2015	Maharani Kottai		
2017	Singam 3	Harbour Shanmugam	
2018	Saamy 2	MLA Aiyarettu Sundaram	
