= Palayathu Amman =

- DVD cover
- Directed by: Rama Narayanan
- Produced by: N. Radha
- Starring: Meena; Ramki; Divya Unni; Charan Raj; Vivek
- Cinematography: N. K. Viswanathan
- Edited by: Rajkeerthi
- Music by: S. A. Rajkumar
- Production company: Sri Thenandal Films
- Release date: 28 October 2000
- Country: India
- Language: Tamil

Palayathu Amman is a 2000 Indian Tamil-language devotional film directed by Rama Narayanan. Meena plays the lead role as goddess Amman, while Ramki, Divya Unni, Charan Raj, and Vivek play supporting roles.

== Plot ==
The film starts with a saint in a gurukula announcing to his students that Devi's birth to kill the evil shall come soon. The Satan kills the saint, but Devi's birth is not stopped. It grows up as a child for Shekar and Savithri. The child gets all kinds of harms from the Satan, but the Goddess Palayathu Amman saves it every time. At the same time, Savithri thinks Palayathu Amman wants to take away her child, so she tries to save it from her. At last, the child is kidnapped and about to be killed when Palayathu Amman kills the Satan and returns the child to her parents.

== Cast ==
- Meena as Palayathu Amman
- Ramki as Shekar
- Divya Unni as Savithri
- Charan Raj as Asureswaran
- Vivek as Kalyanaraman
- Omakuchi Narasimhan as Businessman seeking services of Gemology
- Senthil
- Mayilsamy
- Akshya Jayram as Sathya

== Production ==
The film completed its shoot with the working title of Devatha, before the director chose to title the film Palayathu Amman.

== Soundtrack ==
The music was composed by S. A. Rajkumar.

Song	Singers	Lyrics
Aadi Vanthen	K. S. Chithra	Kalidasan
Veppilai Veppilai	Sujatha Mohan	Kalidasan
Palayathamma Nee	K. S. Chithra	Kalidasan
Paal Nila	Swarnalatha, Anuradha Sriram	Vaali
Anthapura Nandhavanam	Mano, Swarnalatha	Rama Narayanan

== Reception ==
Malini Mannath of Chennai Online wrote, "As the title suggests it is once again a good-versus-evil and a Goddess-testing-devotee kind of a film. There is nothing new by way of subject or treatment" but appreciated the CG towards the climax.

== Legacy ==
The comedy subplot, including a scene where Vivek parodies the climax of Parasakthi (1952) gained immense popularity.
