= English Padam =

2017 Indian film by Kumaresh Kumar

- Theatrical release poster
- Directed by: Kumaresh Kumar
- Written by: Kumaresh Kumar
- Produced by: RJM Vasuki
- Starring: Ramki; Sanjeev; Meenakshi; Sreeja Das
- Cinematography: B. Sai Sathish
- Edited by: M. Mahendran
- Music by: Vikkram Selva
- Production company: RJ Media Creations
- Distributed by: RJ Media Creations
- Release date: 24 November 2017
- Running time: 126 minutes
- Country: India
- Language: Tamil

English Padam (also known as Aangila Padam) is a 2017 Indian Tamil-language horror comedy film written and directed by Kumaresh Kumar, starring Sanjeev, Meenakshi and Ramki.

== Plot ==
Chella is a villager who comes to Chennai to earn money for his sister's marriage. He stays with his uncle. He comes across Meenakshi, a thief, and gradually falls for her. After seeing an advertisement for making easy money by staying in a house for one night, Sanjeev and his uncle go to Kosu Kumar. Kumar takes them to the house owner and tells them that they need to stay in the house for one night so that the owner can sell it, since potential buyers fear the presence of ghost rumors planted by the owner's rivals.

They stay in the house and encounter strange things. They then discover it is the handiwork of Meenakshi, who is paid by the house owner's rivals. Then Rail Murugan appears, who is actually planning to rent the house to a Marwadi family. Sanjeev, his uncle, Meenakshi and Kumar are cheated by Murugan. They then decide to kill him, without success. Finally, they plan to scare out the Marwadi family. They approach Iruttu Pusari, who is a fake shaman. Iruttu Pusari promises to send ghosts to Seth house.

== Cast ==
- Ramki as Rail Murugan
- Sanjeev as Chella
- Meenakshi as Meenakshi (blind parents daughter and an IAS-passed candidate)
- Sreeja Das as Mohana Sundari (Mona)
- Kumaresh Kumar as Kosu Kumar
- Singamuthu as Chella's uncle
- Singampuli as Iruttu Pusari
- Pandu as House Owner
- Jangiri Madhumitha as Bobby
- Crane Manohar as Iruttu Pusari's assistant
- Scissor Manohar as Rail Murugan's henchman
- Lollu Sabha Manohar as Rail Murugan's henchman
- Kadhal Saravanan as Seth

== Production ==
Ramki escaped unhurt while shooting a car chase sequence when a car lost control and almost hit him. The film is titled as English Padam; however, the CBFC certificate says Aangila Padam.

== Reception ==
M. Suganth of The Times of India rated the film 1.5 out of 5 and opined that "The film is structured as a horror comedy, but be in the writing or in the making, it lacks even the basic level of competence". A critic from Maalaimalar called the film average.
