= Poo Manam =

- Title card
- Directed by: S. Rajasekar
- Screenplay by: N. Prasannakumar
- Produced by: S. Rajagopal
- Starring: S. Rajasekar; Mahalakshmi; Janagaraj
- Cinematography: Jayachandran
- Edited by: R. T. Annadurai
- Music by: Vidyasagar
- Production company: Esskay Film Combines
- Release date: 1 January 1989
- Country: India
- Language: Tamil

Poo Manam is a 1989 Indian Tamil language film directed by S. Rajasekar and produced by S. Rajagopal. It stars Rajasekar and Mahalakshmi. The film was released on 1 January 1989. This film marks Vidyasagar's debut as a music composer.

== Cast ==
- S. Rajasekar
- Mahalakshmi
- Janagaraj
- Thyagu

== Soundtrack ==
The music was composed by Vidyasagar. It was his debut film.

Title	Singers	Lyrics
"En Anbe En Nenjil"	K. S. Chithra, Dhenesh	S. A. Rajkumar
"Silaneram Yedhedho Nadakum"	P. B. Sreenivas	Vaali
"Peredukanum Nalla Padichi"	Gangai Amaran	Vaali
"Paatukoduthadhu Yaaro"	Malaysia Vasudevan, K. S. Chithra	S. A. Rajkumar
