= Poovizhi Raja =

- Theatrical release poster
- Directed by: Santhana Bharathi
- Story by: Shanmugasundaram
- Produced by: M. Gopi
- Starring: Prabhu; Ramki; Nishanti
- Cinematography: A. Suresh Kumaar
- Edited by: V. Rajagopal
- Music by: Yuvaraj
- Production company: S. M. Arts
- Distributed by: Ashok Films
- Release date: 8 November 1988
- Country: India
- Language: Tamil

Poovizhi Raja is a 1988 Indian Tamil-language film directed by Santhana Bharathi. The film stars Prabhu and Nishanti. It was released on 8 November 1988.

== Plot ==
A man asks the former managing director of his company to recommend his son for the position. But when he refuses, he resorts to unfair means.

== Cast ==
- Prabhu as Raja
- Ramki as Inspector Kumar
- Nishanti
- Vijayakumar
- Vinu Chakravarthy
- Senthil as
- Chinni Jayanth as Amar
- Pandu
- Nassar
- Babloo Prithiveeraj as Vikaram
- Subha
- Shabnam

== Production ==
Poovizhi Raja was directed by Santhana Bharathi and produced by M. Gopi under S. M. Arts. The story was written by Shanmugasundaram. Cinematography was handled by A. Suresh Kumaar, and the editing by V. Rajagopal.

== Soundtrack ==
The soundtrack was composed by Yuvaraj.

Track listing
No.	Title	Lyrics	Singer(s)	Length
1.	"Vaanil Vattamadippom"	Gangai Amaran	S. P. Balasubrahmanyam, Vani Jairam	4:34
2.	"Eerachelai"	Gangai Amaran	S.P. Balasubrahmanyam, K. S. Chithra	4:17
3.	"Chinnanjiru Koottukkulle"	Piraisoodan	S. P. Balasubrahmanyam	4:47
4.	"Oh Nenjodu Raagam"	Piraisoodan	K. J. Yesudas, K. S. Chithra	5:18
5.	"Ye Maama Onakku"	Pirai Sudan	Malaysia Vasudevan, Vani Jairam	4:04
Total length:				23:00
