= Needhiyin Nizhal =

- Theatrical release poster
- Directed by: Bharathi-Vasu
- Screenplay by: Bharathi-Vasu
- Story by: V. C. Guhanathan
- Produced by: Santhi Narayanasamy
- Starring: Sivaji Ganesan; Radha; Prabhu; M. N. Nambiar
- Cinematography: M. C. Sekar
- Edited by: P. Venkateswara Rao
- Music by: Shankar–Ganesh
- Production company: Sivaji Productions
- Release date: 13 April 1985
- Running time: 150 minutes
- Country: India
- Language: Tamil

Needhiyin Nizhal (transl. Shadow of justice) is a 1985 Indian Tamil-language film, directed by Bharathi-Vasu and produced by Santhi Narayanasamy. The film stars Sivaji Ganesan, Radha, Prabhu and M. N. Nambiar. It was released on 13 April 1985.

== Plot ==
To the general public, Krishna Prasad is known as a rich do-gooder that conducts weddings for the poor and gets the couples jobs in foreign countries. In reality, it is a ploy to traffic the brides into sex work. Along with his associates Ethiraj, Nagaraj and Sukumar, he manages to evade the law and avoid any consequences for his actions. D.I.G Nithyanandam attempts to catch Krishna Prasad but is shot multiple times and lands in a wheel chair. Nithyanandam's oldest son is Vijay, a recent college grad that is nursing a broken heart after his girlfriend Swapna suddenly dumps him. Vijay always gets into fights as he insists on standing up for what's right. He is inspired to join the police after his father is hurt. Vijay sets out to catch Krishna Prasad's group but for every step closer he gets toward his goal, he suffers. He loses his friend Mohan, his parents and younger brother Dileep. He is also beaten badly and presumed dead. Vijay uses this as an opportunity to go undercover and catch his enemies. In the process, he also learns some shocking truths about his past and his family.

== Cast ==
- Sivaji Ganesan as D.I.G Nithyanandam
- Radha as Swapna
- Prabhu as Vijay
- M. N. Nambiar as Krishna Prasad
- Major Sundarrajan as Police Officer Ramanathan
- Chandrasekhar as Mohan
- Sathyaraj as Nagaraj
- Loose Mohan as Rahim Bhai
- Vinu Chakravarthy as Ethiraj
- Srividya as Kalyani
- Nizhalgal Ravi as James
- Sivachandran as Sukumar
- Y. G. Mahendran as Unni

== Production ==
The song "Vaadiyamma Vaadiyamma" was shot at Sathya Studios. The fight sequences and climax were shot at Vauhini Studios.

== Soundtrack ==
The soundtrack was composed by Shankar–Ganesh and the lyrics were by Vaali.

Song	Singers
"Endha Paiyan Ennai"	S. P. Balasubrahmanyam
"Kuthuvilakko Ondru"	S. P. Balasubrahmanyam, Vani Jairam
"Nee Irunthalthan Nimmathi"	S. P. Balasubrahmanyam, Vani Jairam
"Naiyandi Melaththa Kelu"	Malaysia Vasudevan, Vivek Sarathy
"Mantharapoove Manjal Nilave"	S. P. Balasubrahmanyam, P. Susheela
"Vadiyamma Vadiyamma"	S. P. Balasubrahmanyam, Vivek Sarathy

== Release ==
The film was originally scheduled to be released on Diwali 1984.
