= Pudhalvan =

- Directed by: Selva Vinayagam
- Written by: P. Kalaimani (dialogues)
- Screenplay by: Selva Vinayagam
- Story by: Paruchuri brothers
- Produced by: P. Vijayagowri
- Starring: Ramki; Pragathi
- Cinematography: Ravindhar
- Edited by: P. Venkateswara Rao
- Music by: Deva
- Production company: Vijaya Gowri Films
- Distributed by: P. N. R. Pictures
- Release date: 26 December 1997
- Running time: 105 minutes
- Country: India
- Language: Tamil

Pudhalvan is a 1997 Indian Tamil-language action drama film directed by Selva Vinayagam, who had previously directed the films Kottai Vaasal (1992) and Aranmanai Kaavalan (1994). The film stars Ramki and Pragathi, with Vijayakumar, Jayanthi, newcomer Raghavi, Mohan Natarajan, S. N. Vasanth and Raja Raveendar playing supporting roles. It was released on 26 December 1997. The film was a remake of Telugu film Doshi Nirdoshi (1990). Two years after release, the producers were given a ₹5 lakh subsidy by the then Tamil Nadu Chief Minister M. Karunanidhi along with ten other films.

== Plot ==
Siva (Ramki) is an honest police inspector who was brought up by the judge Sathyamoorthy (Vijayakumar) when his mother died. Sathyamoorthy has two sons: Ramesh (S. N. Vasanth) and Raja (Raja Raveendar). The influential smuggler Mudaliar (Mohan Natarajan) often clashes with Siva and Sathyamoorthy. Siva and the jolly college student Priya (Pragathi) fall in love and later get married with Sathyamoorthy's blessing.

One day, Raja rapes Mudaliar's daughter. The next day, Raja is found dead and Siva conducts the investigation. Ramesh admits to his father that he killed Raja. Sathyamoorthy decides to protect Ramesh at all costs, while Siva wants to send Ramesh to jail. What transpires later forms the crux of the story.

== Cast ==
- Ramki as Inspector Siva
- Pragathi as Priya
- Vijayakumar as Sathyamoorthy
- Jayanthi as Parvathi
- Rani
- Meesai Murugesan
- Pandu
- Halwa Vasu
- Mohan Natarajan as Mudaliar
- S. N. Vasanth as Ramesh
- Raja Raveendar as Raja
- Soundar as Soundar
- Thideer Kannaiah
- Raghavi
- Manager Cheena
- Vincent Roy
- Anuja
- M. G. Raja Gopal
- R. K.
- Musthafa
- Mukilan

== Soundtrack ==
The soundtrack was composed by Deva, with lyrics written by Vairamuthu.

Song	Singer(s)	Duration
"Cellular Phone"	Anuradha Sriram, Chorus	5:07
"Kannaana Kanna"	Krishna Sundar	4:59
"Kumari Ponnu"	Krishna Sundar, Swarnalatha	5:02
"MBBS Naan"	Swarnalatha	4:20
"Sattangal Veru"	S. P. Balasubrahmanyam	4:43
