= Palaivana Solai (1981 film) =

1981 film by Robert–Rajasekar

- DVD cover
- Directed by: Robert–Rajasekar
- Screenplay by: Robert–Rajasekar
- Story by: S. Rajasekar
- Produced by: R. Vadivel
- Starring: Chandrasekhar; Janagaraj; Rajeev; Kailas Nath; Thyagu; Suhasini
- Cinematography: Robert–Rajasekar
- Edited by: D. Raj
- Music by: Shankar–Ganesh
- Production company: R. V. Creations
- Release date: 1 May 1981
- Running time: 131 minutes
- Country: India
- Language: Tamil

Palaivana Solai (/pɑːlaɪvənə soʊlaɪ/ transl. Oasis) is a 1981 Indian Tamil-language buddy drama film written, directed and photographed by the duo Robert–Rajasekar in their directorial debut. The film stars Chandrasekhar, Janagaraj, Rajeev, Kailas Nath, Thyagu and Suhasini. It revolves around five friends whose lives are transformed by a new girl arriving in their locality.

Palaivana Solai was released on 1 May 1981. The film became a box-office success, running for over 200 days in theatres. In 1982, it was remade in Telugu as Manchu Pallaki (with Suhasini reprising her role) and in Malayalam as Ithu Njangalude Katha. In 2009 it was again remade in Tamil under the same title.

== Plot ==
Bachelors Sekhar, Senthil, Kumar, Vasu and Siva are friends. Sekhar is a factory worker, Senthil and Kumar are unemployed (with Kumar dependent on his wealthy father), Vasu works at an office and Siva is an aspiring actor. They spend their time sitting on a wall and teasing people, particularly young girls, seeking neighbouring girls to befriend.

A girl named Geetha arrives in the locality and stays in a rented house. The friends initially tease her in their usual manner, but she sportingly retaliates and gradually becomes friendly with them. Her purpose of visiting the city is not known to them. Each of them tries to attract her and come closer to her. However, her focus is on helping others.

Geetha helps Vasu to find a groom for his sister; she changes Senthil's aggressive behaviour and helps him secure a job; she financially helps Siva to send money to his family; makes Kumar understand the importance of respecting his father; and gives emotional support to the rebellious Sekhar. She becomes the centre of all the friends' activities.

Sekhar develops a soft corner for Geetha. She too likes him, but understands her limitations and does not express it. Vasu learns through a pharmacist (Geetha's regular seller) that Geetha is terminally ill. When he asks her about this, she requests him not to reveal this fact to his friends.

When the marriage of Vasu's sister is fixed, one of his colleagues promises to provide money for the dowry. But on the day of the marriage, he is unable to keep his word and the marriage is cancelled due to this. Geetha requests Sekhar to marry Vasu's sister if he respects her and wishes to make her happy. She reveals her terminal illness and that her days are numbered; Sekhar assents to the marriage. Before the event ends, Geetha faints and is hospitalised.

The five friends go out of their way to organise funds for Geetha's treatment, forgetting their egos and past issues. Though the operation eventually takes place, Geetha dies after requesting the five friends to be happy and kind to everyone.

== Cast ==
- Chandrasekhar as Sekhar
- Janagaraj as Senthil
- Rajeev as Kumar
- Kailas Nath as Vasu
- Thyagu as Siva
- Suhasini as Geetha
- Kalaivani as Vasu's sister

== Production ==
Palaivana Solai is the directorial debut of Robert–Rajasekar (Robert Asirvatham and S. Rajasekar). Both also handled cinematography and wrote the screenplay based on Rajasekar's story. This was the first film where the actor Rajasekar was credited as Rajeev, which became his permanent stage name. The film was shot predominantly on the Nungambakkam Highway, Chennai.

== Soundtrack ==
The soundtrack was composed by the duo Shankar–Ganesh, with lyrics written by Vairamuthu. The song "Megame Megame" is set in the raga known as Karnaranjani, and was based on "Tum Nahi Gham Nahi Sharab Nahi", a Ghazal by Jagjit Singh. The song "Engal Kathai" was banned by All India Radio as it was alleged to be promoting communism.

Track listing
No.	Title	Singer(s)	Length
1.	"Aalanaalum Aalu"	Malaysia Vasudevan	4:12
2.	"Engal Kathai"	S. P. Balasubrahmanyam	4:14
3.	"Megame Megame"	Vani Jairam	4:29
4.	"Pournami Neram"	S. P. Balasubrahmanyam	5:04
Total length:			17:59

== Release and reception ==
Palaivana Solai was released on 1 May 1981. Ananda Vikatan gave the film an A score, praising Suhasini's performance and the unconventional screenplay. Sindhu Jeeva of Kalki felt the makers who chose a different plot failed to realise that screenplay is the main focus and the film crawls without any focus while also panning the background score and cinematography but praised the acting of lead actors and concluded they expected a lot considering the title and directors. Naagai Dharuman of Anna praised the acting, music, direction and praised director duo Robert-Rajasekhar for making a film which succeeds in making both laugh and cry. The film became a box-office success, running for over 200 days in theatres.

== Remakes ==
Palaivana Solai was remade in Telugu as Manchu Pallaki (1982), with Suhasini reprising her role. It was also remade in Malayalam as Ithu Njangalude Katha (1982), and again in Tamil in 2009 under the same title. This version featured remixed versions of "Aalanaalum Aalu" and "Megame Megame". A Hindi remake was planned in the early 1980s and Suhasini was offered to reprise her role, but did not come to fruition.

== Legacy ==
Commentators regard Palaivana Solai as a landmark film in Tamil cinema for proving that males can be friends with females without falling in love. Other Tamil films that followed the trope include Pudhu Vasantham (1990) and Punnagai Desam (2002).

== Bibliography ==
- Dhananjayan, G. (2011). The Best of Tamil Cinema, 1931 to 2010: 1977–2010. Galatta Media. OCLC 733724281.
- Indian Cinema. Directorate of Film Festivals, Ministry of Information and Broadcasting. 1981.
- Rajadhyaksha, Ashish; Willemen, Paul (1998) [1994]. Encyclopaedia of Indian Cinema. British Film Institute and Oxford University Press. ISBN 0-19-563579-5.
