= Senthoorapoove =

- Poster
- Directed by: P. R. Devaraj
- Written by: Aabavanan
- Produced by: Aabavanan
- Starring: Vijayakanth; Ramki; Nirosha
- Cinematography: M. M. Rengasamy
- Edited by: R. T. Annadurai
- Music by: Manoj–Gyan
- Production company: Tamil Ponni Arts
- Release date: 23 September 1988
- Running time: 165 minutes
- Country: India
- Language: Tamil
- Box office: ₹2.5 crore

Senthoorapoove (transl. Saffron Flower) is a 1988 Indian Tamil-language romantic action film, directed by P. R. Devaraj, starring Vijayakanth, Ramki, and Nirosha, while Chandrasekhar, Sripriya, C. L. Anandan, Vijaya Lalitha, Anandaraj, Senthil, and Charle play supporting roles. The story is about how a young girl is ill-treated by her stepmother and how her brother's friend saves her and her husband. It was released on 23 September 1988, and grossed ₹2.5 crore. Vijayakanth became popularly known by the sobriquet "Captain" for playing one in the film. It was remade in Kannada in 1992 as Mallige Hoove.

== Plot ==
Captain Soundarapandian, a terminally ill convict, hospitalised and nearing death, evades police security and escapes from the hospital. He arrives in Nilambur and confronts a couple, Ashok and Ponni, who are fleeing from someone. As they board a train, Soundarapandian experiences a massive headache and faints on the railway track. Seeing a train speeding towards him, Ashok dismounts the train to rescue him. While taking him away from the track, Ponni is abducted by some goons pursuing them. The rest of the goons engage in a fight with Ashok, who is almost defeated when Soundarapandian regains consciousness and subdues them. Ashok and his confidante Gopal take Soundarapandian to the former's shelter, where Gopal hints that he has seen Soundarapandian somewhere but does not reveal much due to Soundarapandian's gestures. Meanwhile, Dr. Sundaramurthy, who treats Soundarapandian, decides to find his patient by himself due to the police force's inefficiency.

Ashok reveals the reason why the goons were following them. Ashok arrived in Nilambur as a field officer. He fell in love with Ponni after hearing her sing. Ponni is the daughter of a henpecked landlord Rajavelu. After his wife's death, Rajavelu married an ambitious woman, Ponnamma, who torments Ponni for her wealth. As a child, Ponni's marriage was conducted by the evil Ponnamma. After her husband's death, she is forced to live as a widow. Ponnamma did this all to amass Ponni's wealth. The only person who used to be kind to Ponni was Ponnamma's son Oomaiyan. However, after picking a fight owing to an unfortunate incident with his mother, he left the village, promising to return soon. As soon as Ponni begins to have feelings for Ashok, Ponnamma discovers the truth and swears to separate them.

Soundarapandian's tale is also revealed in a nonlinear way (as his memories). Soundarapandian was a soldier who, along with a young teacher Radha, jailed a local thug Udayappan. Soundarapandian later married Radha. Gopal was from Soundarapandian's village. Years later, a young man joins their family as a servant. Udayappan, upon escaping from prison, murders Soundarapandian's wife, son, and the servant. Soundarapandian manages to kill Udayappan, but not before the latter severely beats him. The servant was Oomaiyan, who, before his death, had requested Soundarapandian to save Ponni from his evil mother Ponnamma. This was the reason behind his arrival in the village. After failing to negotiate with Ponnamma, Soundarapandian plots to take Ponni away from her house secretly. However, the plan fails, and Sundaramurthy saves a nearly dead Soundarapandian.

After learning about Soundarapandian's condition, Ashok decides to leave his love and the village to make Soundarapandian continue his treatment. He later drops the plan after thinking it over. Soundarapandian, Ashok, and Sundaramurthy make one last attempt to save Ponni. Having had enough of his wife, Rajavelu helps Ponni escape and later asks Ponnamma to consume poison before he commits suicide; they both die. Although Ponnamma's goons follow them, Ashok, Ponni, Sundaramurthy, and Soundarapandian manage to escape in a train with Soundarapandian almost dead.

== Cast ==
- Vijayakanth as Captain Soundarapandian
- Ramki as Ashok
- Nirosha as Ponni (Senthoora Poove)
- Chandrasekhar as Dr. Sundaramurthy
- C. L. Anandan as Rajavelu, Ponni's father
- Vijaya Lalitha as Ponnamma
- Senthil as Gopal
- Charle as Pacchi
- Muralidharan as Oomaiyan
- Azhagu as Parameshwaran
- Pasi Narayanan as Annakaavadi
- Sripriya as Radha (Guest Appearance)
- Anandaraj as Udayappan (Guest Appearance)
- Kullamani
- Karuppu Subbiah
- Vellai Subbaiah
- Pakoda Kadhar
- Sivaraman

== Production ==
Sathyaraj was the initial choice for the role that Vijayakanth later played.

== Soundtrack ==
The soundtrack was composed by Manoj–Gyan. For the dubbed Telugu version Sindhura Puvvu, all lyrics were written by Rajasri.

Tamil
| No. | Title | Lyrics | Singer(s) | Length |
|---|---|---|---|---|
| 1. | "Kiliye Ilangkiliye" | Vairamuthu | Malaysia Vasudevan, S. P. Sailaja | 5:05 |
| 2. | "Sothanai Theeravillae" | Vairamuthu | P. Jayachandran | 4:37 |
| 3. | "Sendhoora Poove" | Muthulingam | S. P. Balasubrahmanyam, B. S. Sasirekha | 4:41 |
| 4. | "Chinna Kannan" | Muthulingam | S. P. Balasubrahmanyam, K. S. Chithra | 4:12 |
| 5. | "Vaadi Pula" | Muthulingam | Malaysia Vasudevan | 4:18 |
| 6. | "Varape Thalaiyaane" | Aabavanan | T. S. Raghavendra, B. S. Sasirekha | 4:16 |
| 7. | "Muthu Mani Pallaaku" | Aabavanan | B. S. Sasirekha | 4:50 |
| 8. | "Aathukulle Yelelo" | Aabavanan | Raghavendar, B. S. Sasirekha | 1:31 |
| Total length: | | | | 33:30 |

Telugu
| No. | Title | Singer(s) | Length |
|---|---|---|---|
| 1. | "Sindhura Puvva" | S. P. Balasubrahmanyam, K. S. Chithra | 4:35 |
| 2. | "Chilaka Rachilaka" | Mano, S. P. Sailaja | 5:04 |
| 3. | "Kanivini Yerugani" | S. P. Balasubrahmanyam, K. S. Chithra | 4:06 |
| 4. | "Ninu Yevaro Kottarata" | Mano, S. P. Sailaja | 1:22 |
| 5. | "Thurupamma Mudda" | Mano | 2:04 |
| 6. | "Yetilona Yelleti" | Mano, S. P. Sailaja | 1:28 |
| Total length: | | | 18:40 |

== Reception ==
The Indian Express wrote "[..] the knot on which Senthoora Poove bases [..] cooks up another cinematic stew and serves it in style". Jayamanmadhan of Kalki criticised the story. Vijaykanth won the Tamil Nadu State Film Award for Best Actor, and the Cinema Express Award for Best Character Actor. K. Sampath was awarded Tamil Nadu State Film Award for Best Audiographer.

== Legacy ==
Senthoora Poove is one of only two films directed by P. R. Devaraj, the other being Ilaya Ragam (1995) before his death in May 2016. After the film's release, Vijayakanth earned the title and nickname "Captain", which was further popularised with the release of Captain Prabhakaran in 1991. Following Vijayakanth's death in December 2023, Film Companion included the film in their list "7 Vijayakanth Films That Left an Indian Cinema Legacy".
