= Vetri Padigal =

- Poster
- Directed by: Manobala
- Written by: Liaquat Ali Khan (dialogues)
- Screenplay by: Manobala
- Story by: Mahesh Kothare
- Produced by: G. Saravanan; K. Ganesh; K. Ramraja
- Starring: Ramki; Nirosha
- Cinematography: B. R. Vijayalakshmi
- Edited by: G. R. Anil Malnad
- Music by: Ilaiyaraaja
- Production companies: Chitramahaal and S. A. Enterprises
- Release date: 15 March 1991
- Running time: 110 minutes
- Country: India
- Language: Tamil

Vetri Padigal (transl. Steps of success) is a 1991 Indian Tamil-language action thriller film directed by Manobala. The film stars Ramki and Nirosha, with Srividya, R. Sarathkumar, V. K. Ramasamy, Jai Ganesh and Vinu Chakravarthy playing supporting roles. It was released on 15 March 1991.

== Plot ==
A robbery gang terrorized the state of Tamil Nadu. The police officer Mahesh (Ramki) is charged to dismantle the gang. Mahesh lives with his widowed blind sister Vidya (Srividya), and his niece Anu. The reporter Vimala (Nirosha) compels Mahesh for an interview, but he refuses. She later finds herself swooning over his investigative intellect. They later fall in love with each other. Guruji (R. Sarathkumar), the local gang-buster, then becomes discomposed with Mahesh for falling in love with Vimala, his ex-fiancé.

In the past, Mahesh was a happy-go-lucky and immature youth. Furthermore, Mahesh hated the police while his brother-in-law, a police officer, was in charge to catch the robbery gang. His brother-in-law was later killed in a bomb blast, and his sister became blind. To take revenge, Mahesh became a police officer. The rest of the story is about how Mahesh catches the robbery gang and its leader Guruji.

== Cast ==
- Ramki as Mahesh
- Nirosha as Vimala
- R. Sarathkumar as Guruji
- Srividya as Vidya
- V. K. Ramasamy as Vadivelu
- Jai Ganesh as Ganesh
- Vinu Chakravarthy as Karuppuswamy
- Janagaraj as Govind
- Thyagu as Kannayiram
- Kitty in a guest appearance
- Disco Shanti
- Idichapuli Selvaraj
- Ponnambalam
- Vasu
- Thalapathy Dinesh
- Baby Vichithra as Anu
- Master N. Venkatraman
- Ravishankar
- Ravindranath
- Kanniappan
- P.T.C. Pandiyan
- Sakthivel
- Vellai Subbaiah
- Varatharajan
- Chinni Shanmugam

== Soundtrack ==
The music was composed by Ilaiyaraaja.

Song	Singer(s)	Lyrics	Duration
"Kanavu Palithadu"	S. Janaki, S. P. Balasubrahmanyam	Siva	4:59
"Oru Kaathu"	S. Janaki, Saibaba	Vaali	4:33
"Unnai Kaakkum"	Ilaiyaraaja	Vaali	1:22
