= Athma (film) =

1993 film by Prathap K. Pothan

- Theatrical release poster
- Directed by: Pratap Pothen
- Screenplay by: Pratap Pothen
- Story by: Shanmughapriyan
- Based on: The Miracle by Irving Wallace
- Produced by: Ajitha Hari
- Starring: Ramki; Rahman; Nassar; Gautami; Kasthuri
- Cinematography: Madhu Ambat
- Edited by: B. Lenin; V. T. Vijayan
- Music by: Ilaiyaraaja
- Production company: Supriya International
- Release date: 9 July 1993
- Running time: 140 minutes
- Country: India
- Language: Tamil

Athma (transl. Soul) is a 1993 Indian Tamil-language supernatural thriller film directed by Pratap Pothen. The film stars Ramki, Rahman, Nassar, Gautami and Kasthuri. It is based on the book The Miracle by Irving Wallace. The film was released on 9 July 1993.

== Plot ==
Raghunandan "Raghu", an atheist archaeologist, travels with his theist father, the spiritual guru Athmaram Swamigal, and photographer Shiva to an isolated village near the Pothigai hills to decode a rock‑cut inscription in the Nagakali Amman temple. They discover that the temple was built by the saint Nagalinga Siddhar and that its presiding deity is a cobra; legend warns that anyone who approaches without pure intent will be punished. While worshipping, Athmaram suddenly faints and his mind remains disturbed. The current heir of the demon‑worshippers, Nambiyatri, is tasked with destroying the holy soul that killed his ancestors before it can achieve immortality at the upcoming full moon. The demon fire reveals that this soul resides within Athmaram, prompting Nambiyatri to vow to kill him. The next morning, Athmaram vanishes, and a cobra is found in his room. Raghu suspects a strange noise he heard the night before. A police dog leads them to a ruined bungalow belonging to Nambiyatri, where priest Esakkimuthu reports hearing an eerie female voice. Athmaram's yellow towel is later found hanging near Nagalinga Siddhar's grave, which Esakkimuthu interprets as a sign that a miracle is about to occur.

Guhai Amma, the elderly priest, summons Raghu and tells him that the prophecy box of Nagalinga Siddhar has been opened. The manuscript predicts that on the upcoming Pournami (full‑moon night) the Nagakali Amman temple will become extraordinarily powerful, the deity will appear in a devotee's eyes, and anyone who immerses in the nearby waterfall before the night will be cured of any disease. Raghu doubts the prophecy and brings the manuscript to his colleague, Padma, to verify its age; Padma confirms that it is approximately 150 years old. Padma contacts her journalist friend Divya—a blind woman who lost her sight in a firecracker accident—to publish the story. Padma also hopes to take her lover, the terminal‑cancer singer Naveen, to the temple for a divine cure, convincing the initially reluctant Divya that the waters might restore her vision. Naveen's mother, a senior doctor, opposes the pilgrimage because of a scheduled surgery, so Padma marries Naveen and then persuades his mother to let him go. Divya asks Raghu for the manuscript to publish; he initially refuses, calling it superstition, but later consents, hoping the publicity will help locate his missing father.

A terrorist cell led by Saravanan plots to blow up the Nagakali Amman temple, believing the shrine exploits devotees. Saravanan's vendetta stems from his sister and her husband—a TNHRCE official—being murdered by the temple chief after they exposed the chief’s looting. The group needs about ₹300,000 (equivalent to ₹2,171,988 in 2023); Nambiyatri funds them. When terrorist Anil dies in a road accident, his diary falls into the hands of Commissioner Hari, Divya's brother, who is tasked with preventing the attack. Divya persuades Hari to let her join the operation, hoping the pilgrimage will restore her sight. As the Pournami approaches, devotees flood the temple. Saravanan rents a lodge room and escapes just as Hari and the police arrive, aided by the lodge boy Meiyappan, whom Hari keeps as an informant. Raghu hears a disturbance, follows it to a ruined bungalow, spots his father’s bracelet and blood stains, and alerts Hari. When Hari returns, the stains have vanished, and he rebukes Raghu for the false lead.

Raghu confronts Guhai Amma, suspecting she knows about his missing father. She reveals that Athmaram is his adoptive father; she rescued the infant Raghu from the temple and gave him to Athmaram. Raghu passes the car‑registration number to Shiva to investigate a possible link to his father's disappearance. Shiva tracks down the address, but is burned to death before he can report back. Meanwhile, Divya's guide Erimalai leaves, and she walks toward the river, where Saravanan rescues her. Saravanan, Divya's former college lover turned terrorist, hides his identity by speaking in a different voice and tells her his name is Vignesh, claiming he lost a leg in an accident and has come to the temple for a divine cure. Hari lets Saravanan stay at his place, and Saravanan hides bombs in his walking stick. Seeing Divya's devotion, he pretends that "Saravanan" is dead and urges her to move on, but she refuses and even contemplates suicide. Moved by her desperation, Saravanan finally reveals his true identity, and they reconcile.

With only three days left until Pournami, the terrorist gang arrives in the village and is stunned to find Saravanan together with Commissioner Hari's sister, Divya. They murder the lodge boy Meiyappan for being a police informer and demand that Saravanan kill Divya. Uma, whom Raghu had once seen in the haunted bungalow, leads him to Guhai Amma. Having learned of Shiva's death and the terrorists' infiltration, Raghu now embraces faith and asks Guhai Amma for help. Guhai Amma recounts the past: in a previous life, Raghu's father Athmaram was the saint Nagalinga Siddhar. The Nambiyatri demon‑worshippers tormented the villagers, but Nagalinga Siddhar's worship of Nagakali Amman rendered Nambiyatri powerless. To weaken him, Nambiyatri sent his sister Mohini to obtain the sacred Bījamantra. Mohini fell in love with Siddhar and begged him to live with her; he refused. After Siddhar saved her from suicide, they shared an intimate moment, which he regretted. Mohini then killed herself, vowing to reunite with him in her next birth. Enraged, Nambiyatri cursed that Nagalinga Siddhar's soul would wander without peace, and the saint died.

In the present life, Athmaram regains his past‑birth memories and the sacred Bījamantra when he visits the temple, prompting Nambiyatri and his sister Mohini to kidnap him to extract the mantra and prevent the holy soul from achieving immortality. Raghu discovers that Guhai Amma sent Uma to the haunted bungalow to spill holy water; Uma is not a demon and confesses that Raghu is her "God‑fixed" husband. Guhai Amma orders Raghu to bring his father to the temple before the Pournami ends, but while they head back to the cave, Nambiyatri's black magic kills Guhai Amma. Two days before Pournami, Hari finds Meiyappan's corpse in the forest and, following orders, travels to Madras. The next morning, Uma regains consciousness and rescues Raghu. Through priest Esakkimuthu, Saravanan learns that the deity will appear at the seventh bell of the celebrations. Divya confesses her love for Saravanan, and Hari, recalling Saravanan earlier as "Vignesh," becomes suspicious. Hari investigates Saravanan's background, uncovering his sister's mental collapse after a tragedy and learning that Saravanan is feigning a limp and pretending to seek a divine cure at the temple.

The long‑awaited Pournami arrives. Raghu and Uma head for the dilapidated bungalow where Raghu's father may be held. They cross a dangerous waterfall where Uma slips and falls into the river, but Raghu continues, enters the bungalow, and begins to fight Nambiyatri, Mohini and their henchmen, but they knock him unconscious. To obtain the mantra, Mohini whips Athmaram and tries to seduce him. Raghu regains consciousness, attacks Mohini and Nambiyatri brutally, and rescues his father. Saravanan reveals to Durga that he is the terrorist whom Hari is trying to capture. He tells her to leave the village for her safety, but she refuses. Vikas, a member of the terrorist gang, remains determined to kill Divya. Saravanan stops Vikas before he can harm Divya, and in that struggle, Vikas falls off the cliff and dies. Saravanan enters the temple, pretending to be a devotee, while Raghu and his father rush to the temple. Divya also proceeds toward the temple, hearing the bell, to persuade Saravanan. Hari, now aware that Saravanan is the terrorist, rushes to stop the blast. Padma prays wholeheartedly for her husband Naveen's recovery.

The climax unfolds as Saravanan hides bomb sticks in the garbhagriha's sacred snake nest, but a holy cobra bites him. Hari immediately announces the imminent blast and orders all devotees to evacuate; only Padma and her husband Naveen, remain in deep meditation. He threatens Saravanan to deactivate the bomb, or he will kill his sister. Overcome by the venom, Saravanan attempts to remove the device, but it detonates, killing him. The explosion's flash miraculously restores Divya's sight. Meanwhile, Raghu and his father reach the deity; the father dies before the divine presence, his soul achieving immortality and permanently weakening the demonic Nambiyatri. Divya mourns Saravanan's death, while Uma, presumed drowned, reappears alive and reunites with Raghu. Finally, a radiant light appears before Padma, curing Naveen's cancer.

== Cast ==
- Rahman as Raghunandan "Raghu" (credited as Raghu)
- Ramki as Saravanan / Vignesh
- Nassar as Commissioner Hari
- Senthil as Meiyappan
- Gautami as Divya
- Kasthuri as Uma
- Vinodhini as Padma
- Vaani
- C. R. Vijayakumari as Guhai Amma
- Vijayachander in a dual role as Athmaram Swamigal and Nagalinga Siddhar
- Vikas Rishi as Vikas
- Riyaz Khan as Naveen
- Vimalraj as Nambiyatri
- Sathyapriya as Naveen's mother
- Sangeetha as Saravanan's sister
- Surekha
- Vichithra in a special appearance
- Vennira Aadai Moorthy as Constable Kattabomman
- A. K. Veerasamy as Priest Esakkimuthu
- Chinni Jayanth as Erimalai
- R. S. Shivaji as Shiva
- LIC Narasimhan as the college principal
- Thideer Kannaiah as Saravanan's neighbour
- Ramesh Khanna
- Subbu Panchu Arunachalam as Anil (uncredited role)

== Soundtrack ==
The soundtrack was composed by Ilaiyaraaja, with lyrics written by Vaali.

Song	Singer(s)	Duration
"Inarul Tharum"	T. N. Seshagopalan	4:56
"Kannale Kadhal Kavithai"	K. J. Yesudas, S. Janaki	4:44
"Ninaikkindra Paadhaiyil"	S. Janaki	4:13
"Vaarayo Unnake Saran"	Mano	4:28
"Vidiyum Pozhudhu"	Mano	3:19
"Vilakku Vaipom"	S. Janaki	5:05

== Reception ==
Malini Mannath of The Indian Express wrote, "Aathma is a slick presentation from Prathap and the main story has been efficiently handled. But he could have avoided slipping into the formula pattern now and then". K. Vijiyan of New Straits Times said, "It takes courage to attempt a movie like this, and Prathap's story grabs your attention".
