= Santhana Bharathi =

Indian film director and actor

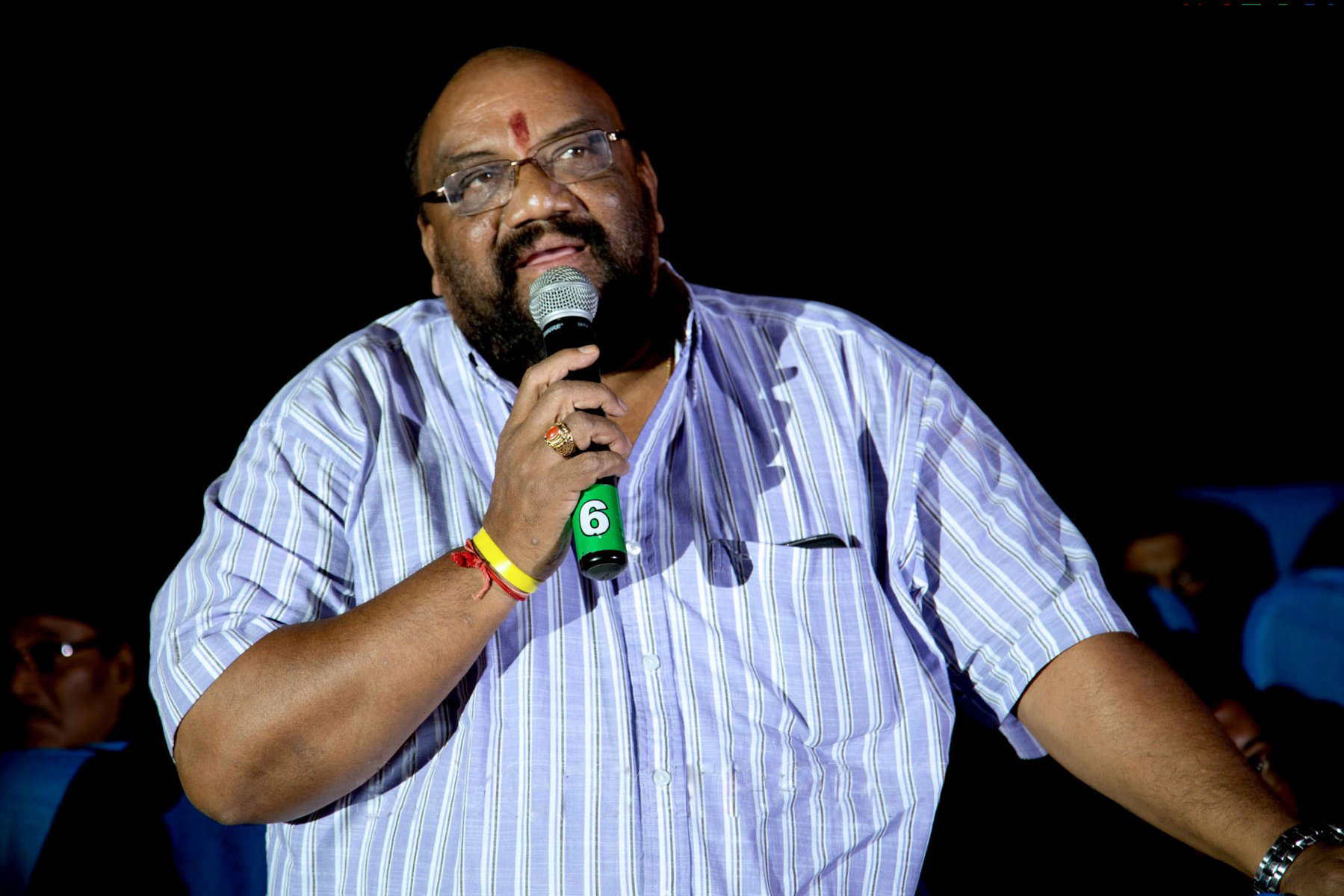
- Santhana Bharathi in 2014
- Occupations: Film director; actor; screenwriter
- Years active: 1981–present
- Notable credits: Mahanadhi; Gunaa
- Father: M. R. Santhanam
- Family: R. S. Shivaji (brother)

Santhana Bharathi is an Indian film director and actor who has primarily worked in Tamil cinema. He directed Gunaa (1991), which won third prize for the Tamil Nadu State Film Award for Best Film. He also directed Mahanadhi (1994), which won the National Film Award for Best Feature Film in Tamil and the Tamil Nadu State Film Award Special Prize.

== Personal life ==
Bharathi's father M. R. Santhanam was an actor and producer, one of the earliest members of the Nadigar Sangam. His brother R. S. Shivaji was also an actor. Bharathi's son Sanjay Bharathi is also a director.

== Career ==
Santhana Bharathi joined director C. V. Sridhar as an assistant. Bharathi started his career with P. Vasu as a co-director and made films such as Panneer Pushpangal (1981), Madhu Malar (1981), Mella Pesungal (1983), Sahasame Jeevitham (1984) and Needhiyin Nizhal (1985). According to Vasu, "We compromised on certain things as we had different approaches to the subject. That's the reason why some of our other movies failed to make a big impression in the box office, prompting us to take our own paths".

== Filmography ==
=== As actor ===
List of Santhana Bharathi film credits as actor
Year	Title	Role	Notes
1988	En Uyir Kannamma	Velayudham	
1988	Ullathil Nalla Ullam	Father	
1988	En Jeevan Paduthu		
1989	Karagattakaran	Chinnarasu	
1990	Aarathi Edungadi		
1990	Ethir Kaatru	Minister Azhagesan	
1990	Velai Kidaichuduchu	Speaker	
1991	Onnum Theriyatha Papa	Jana	
1991	Thambikku Oru Pattu	Ponnusaamy	
1991	Michael Madana Kama Rajan	Alex	
1992	Ele, My Friend	Kallar Village Chief	English film
1994	Nammavar	Sakthivel	
1994	Magalir Mattum	Father of the groom	
1995	Mr. Madras	Guest appearance	
1995	Seethanam		
1996	Love Birds		
1996	Amman Kovil Vaasalile	Guest appearance	
1996	Tamizh Selvan		
1997	Vivasaayi Magan		
1998	Velai		
1998	Veera Thalattu		
1998	Poonthottam	Suresh's father	
1998	Guru Paarvai	Priya's father	
1999	En Swasa Kaatre		
1999	Unnaruge Naan Irundhal		
1999	Aasaiyil Oru Kaditham	Chandini's father	
2000	Mugavaree	RK Ram	
2000	Budget Padmanabhan		
2000	Vaanavil		
2000	Penngal		
2001	Friends	Sethupathi	
2001	Ullam Kollai Poguthae	Doctor	
2001	Dosth	Judge	
2001	Samudhiram	Lakshmi's father	
2001	Dubai	Karnataka Home Minister Bhadrappa	Malayalam film
2001	Kadal Pookkal		
2002	Alli Arjuna	House owner	
2002	Panchatanthiram	Bharathi	
2002	Pammal K. Sambandam	Sambandam's uncle	
2002	King	Dr. Cheenu	
2002	Villain	Father Karunakaran	
2003	Anbe Sivam	Padayatchi's assistant	
2003	Nala Damayanthi	Flight Passenger	
2003	Winner	Neelaveni's uncle	
2004	Vasool Raja MBBS	Gangadharan	
2005	Aayudham		
2005	Sukran	Judge	
2005	Mumbai Xpress	Chettiar	
2005	Amudhey	Nancy's father	
2005	Kaatrullavarai	Peethambharan	
2005	White Rainbow	Priest	Hindi film
2005	Anbe Aaruyire	College Chairman	
2006	Aathi	Pottabhi	
2006	Jerry	Jerry's father	
2006	Aran	Sandhya's father	
2006	Paramasivan	Malar's father	
2006	Varalaru	Gayathri's servant	
2006	Kizhakku Kadarkarai Salai	Politician	
2007	Nam Naadu	Political member	
2007	Puli Varudhu	Shenbagam's father	
2007	Marudhamalai		
2008	Thotta		
2008	Dasavathaaram	Ragavendra's brother-in-law	
2008	Satyam	Minister Malarmannan	
2008	Kuselan	Kuppusamy's assistant	
2009	Padikkadavan	Ramalingam	
2009	Rajadhi Raja		
2009	Ragavan		
2009	Maasilamani	Councillor	
2009	Madurai Sambavam	Caroline's father	
2009	Unnaipol Oruvan	Karamchand Lala	Bilingual film
2010	Porkkalam	Sadha	
2010	Kattradhu Kalavu	Vaikavardhan	
2010	Ochayee	Aandi Thevar	
2010	Virudhagiri	Police commissioner	
2011	Siruthai	Home Minister	
2011	Ponnar Shankar		
2011	Eththan	Selvi's father	
2011	Marudhavelu	Judge	
2012	Maasi	Maasilamani's Corrupt Senior Officer	
2012	Kadhal Pisase	Businessman	
2013	Alex Pandian	Home Minister	
2013	Chennaiyil Oru Naal		
2013	Oruvar Meethu Iruvar Sainthu		
2013	All in All Azhagu Raja	Khader Bhai	
2013	Jannal Oram	Senior Bus Repair Mechanic	
2014	Vallinam	Puzhaldasan	
2014	Tenaliraman	Ex Chettiar/Man	
2014	Aranmanai	Chairman	
2014	Poojai	Annathandavam's lawyer	
2014	Pagadai Pagadai	Priya's father	
2015	Aambala	Thalaivar	
2015	Sandamarutham	Magistrate	
2015	Eli	Jail Warden Ezhumalai	
2015	Kathirvel Kakka		
2015	Thoongaa Vanam	Thandapani	
2016	Thozha	Police officer	
2016	Oopiri (Telugu)	Police officer	
2016	Meen Kuzhambum Mann Paanaiyum	Pavithra's grandfather	
2016	Kadavul Irukaan Kumaru	Church Priest	
2016	Chennai 600028 II	Chellaiya	
2017	Shivalinga	Abdullah	
2017	7 Naatkal	Chief Minister	
2017	Yaanum Theeyavan	Sethuramalingam	
2018	Kalakalappu 2	Ganesh's foster father	
2018	Diya	Chief Minister	
2018	Kanam (Telugu)	Chief Minister	
2018	Tamizh Padam 2	Nakul	
2019	Goko Mako	Yamagundan	
2019	LKG	Politician	
2019	Ayogya	Home Minister	
2019	Gorilla	Ramaiya	
2019	Thavam		
2019	RK Nagar	Chairman Sundaramoorthy	
2020	Dagaalty	Malli's father	
2020	Indha Nilai Maarum		
2021	Operation JuJuPi	Politician	
2021	Plan Panni Pannanum	Karikalan	
2022	Vikram	Agent Uppiliappan	
2022	Rivet		
2022	Dha Dha		
2023	Ghosty		
2024	Sooriyanum Sooriyagandhiyum		
2024	Nirangal Moondru	Minister Iyyappan	
2024	Sorgavaasal	Minister	
2025	Otha Votu Muthaiya	Minister	
2025	Jenma Natchathiram	Film producer	
2025	Gangers	Agasalingam	
2025	Madharaasi	Raghu's grandfather	
2025	Aaromaley	Xavier	

=== Television ===
List of Santhana Bharathi television credits
Year	Title	Role	Platform
1998	Sakthi		Sun TV
2006–2008	Lakshmi		Sun TV
2013	Ponnunjal		Sun TV
2019	Pondati		Roadside Romeos
2021	Kuruthi Kalam	Paneerselvam	MX Player
2022	Suzhal: The Vortex	Kodandaraman	Amazon Prime Video
2022–2024	Iniya	Tiruvasagam	Sun TV
2024	Thalaimai Seyalagam	Minister Selvapuviarasan	ZEE5
2024	Veera	Special Appearance	Zee Tamil

=== As director ===
- All works in Tamil unless noted otherwise

Year	Film	Notes
1981	Panneer Pushpangal	Co-directed with P. Vasu
1981	Madhu Malar	Co-directed with P. Vasu
1983	Mella Pesungal	Co-directed with P. Vasu
1984	Sahasame Jeevitham	Telugu film; Co-directed with P. Vasu
1985	Needhiyin Nizhal	Co-directed with P. Vasu
1987	Kadamai Kanniyam Kattupaadu	remake of Aavanazhi
1988	En Thamizh En Makkal	
1988	Poovizhi Raja	
1990	Kavalukku Kettikaran	remake of Nandi Veendum Varika
1991	Guna	3rd prize – Tamil Nadu State Film Award for Best Film
1993	Chinna Mapillai	
1994	Mahanadhi	Tamil Nadu State Film Award Special Prize; National Film Award for Best Feature Film in Tamil
1994	Vietnam Colony	remake of Malayalam film of same name
1995	Engirundho Vandhan	remake of Malayalam film Chithram

=== As writer ===
- Raja Paarvai (1981)
