= Valayal Satham =

- Title card
- Directed by: Jeevabalan
- Written by: Jeevabalan
- Produced by: K. R. Prakash
- Starring: Murali; Bhagya; Raja; Madhuri
- Cinematography: D. Sankar
- Edited by: B. Kandasamy
- Music by: M. S. Viswanathan
- Production company: Balan Pictures
- Release date: 13 February 1987
- Running time: 137 minutes
- Country: India
- Language: Tamil

Valayal Satham (transl. The Sound of Bangles) is a 1987 Indian Tamil-language film written and directed by Jeevabalan. The film stars Murali, Bhagyalakshmi (credited as Bhagya), Raja and Madhuri. It was released on 13 February 1987.

== Cast ==
- Murali
- Bhagya
- Raja
- Madhuri
- M. N. Nambiar
- M. N. Rajam
- Manorama
- Janagaraj
- Senthil
- Anuja
- S. R. Vijaya
- Sri Gowri
- Shyamalakumari
- Chinni Jayanth
- M. S. K. Kumaran
- Pattukottai Bhaskar
- K. Renga Ramanujam
- Master Sathish
- Master Aravind
- Pasi Narayanan
- Vellai Subbaiah
- Kumarimuthu
- M. L. A. Thangaraj
- Kullamani
- Pakkirisamy
- Nellai Sarathy
- Periya Karuppu Thevar
- Jothi Kathirvel
- Lagiyam Ramadurai

== Production ==
The film was originally titled Vizhiye Mozhi Pesu. The song "Kanvizhi Enbadhu" was shot at Bangalore.

== Soundtrack ==
The soundtrack was composed by M. S. Viswanathan, with lyrics written by Vaali.

Track listing
No.	Title	Singer(s)	Length
1.	"Ezhai Kudisaiyil"	K. S. Chithra
2.	"Nandhavana Kuyilukku"	K. J. Yesudas, K. S. Chithra
3.	"Kan Vizhi Enbadhu"	K. J. Yesudas, S. Janaki
4.	"Oorula Ulagathula"	Malaysia Vasudevan, Sadan

== Reception ==
The Indian Express wrote the film "takes refuge in clichés normal to the general run of Tamil films".
