= Janagaraj =

Indian actor (born 1950)

- Born: 29 May 1955 (age 71); Madras, Madras State (now Chennai, Tamil Nadu), India
- Occupations: Actor, comedian
- Years active: 1978–2008; 2018-present
- Spouse: Malathi
- Children: 1

Janagaraj is an Indian actor who has appeared in over 240 films, predominantly in Tamil cinema, in comedic or supporting roles. He has also starred in a few Malayalam, Telugu and Hindi films. He was one of the top comedians in the Tamil industry during the 1980s and 1990s.

== Early life ==
Janagaraj was born to Vadivelu and Muthulakshmi in Chennai, Tamil Nadu. He joined the Auditor General's Office as a Junior Division Clerk in 1976 and worked part-time as a theatre artist and a stage artist due to his desire to act and perform. He was friendly with Delhi Ganesh, another AGS employee, who remained his closest lifelong friend.

Janagaraj joined director Bharathiraja as his unofficial assistant. After seeing his talent during the shooting of Kizhake Pogum Rail, Bharathiraja gave him the chance to act as a side character in the same movie. Later in Puthiya Vaarpugal, Bharathiraja gave Janagaraj another sensational character as a minor boy of the villain (G. Srinivasan). Janagaraj had acted with a trouser and baniyan for that movie.

Janagaraj found his break in 1980 in Bharathiraja's Nizhalgal and was among the most wanted comedians, having shared roles with major film stars like Sivakumar, Rajinikanth, Kamal Haasan, Ramki, Sivaji Ganesan and with major film directors like Mani Ratnam, K. Balachander and Suresh Krishna.

== Film career ==
=== Beginning ===
In 1978, he was introduced by director Bharathiraja in Kizhake Pogum Rail and he continued to give chance to him in his films Puthiya Vaarpugal (1979), Kaadhal Oviyam (1982) and Oru Kaidhiyin Diary (1985).

Janagaraj's career however spun to silver in the 1980s. Starting with Nizhalgal (1980), continuing in Sindhu Bhairavi (1985), Palaivana Rojakkal (1986), Muthal Vasantham (1986), Agni Natchathiram (1988), Rajadhi Raja (1989) and Apoorva Sagodharargal (1989). Janagaraj became a popular comedian in Tamil films. He is known for his peculiar voice and face expression. He has also acted in supporting roles in films like Nayakan (1987), Kizhakku Vasal (1990), Annaamalai (1992) and Baashha (1995). He was main sidekick for Kamal Haasan and Rajinikanth in 80s and early 90s films. Suruli Rajan's untimely death pushed him to forefront for roles that demanded comedy as well as character support.

=== Later years ===
His latest roles were in King (2002), Aayutha Ezhuthu (2004) and M. Kumaran S/O Mahalakshmi (2004) as supporting roles. He acted a negative role in Aayudham (2005). After a hiatus, Janagaraj made his acting comeback with 96 (2018) and Dha Dha 87 (2019).

== Award ==
- Tamil Nadu State Film Award for Best Character Artiste (Male) for – King (2002)

== Filmography ==
=== Tamil films ===
Year	Film	Role	Notes
1978	Kizhake Pogum Rail	Panchayat Member	
1979	Suvarilladha Chiththirangal	Palanisamy	
1979	Puthiya Vaarpugal	Periyavar's son	
1980	Kallukkul Eeram		
1980	Ilamai Kolam	Suresh's friend	
1980	Nizhalgal	Moneylender	
1981	Enakkaga Kaathiru		
1981	Palaivana Solai	Senthil	
1982	Kalyana Kalam		
1982	Kaadhal Oviyam		
1982	Pakkathu Veetu Roja		
1983	Paayum Puli	Chinnasamy	
1983	Mann Vasanai	School Teacher	
1983	Ilamai Kaalangal		
1983	Thoongadhey Thambi Thoongadhey	Fake doctor	
1983	Dhooram Adhighamillai		
1984	Kuva Kuva Vaathugal		
1984	Nooravathu Naal	John	
1984	Thambikku Entha Ooru	Ramaiya	
1984	Pudhumai Penn		
1984	Shanthi Muhurtham		
1984	Ingeyum Oru Gangai		
1984	Unga Veetu Pillai		
1984	Iru Medhaigal	Mahesh	
1984	Vaai Sollil Veeranadi		
1984	Ambigai Neril Vanthaal		
1984	January 1		
1985	Oru Kaidhiyin Diary	Velappan	
1985	Mannukketha Ponnu	Chinna Pannai	
1985	Kanni Rasi	Shivaraman	
1985	Oru Malarin Payanam		
1985	Anni		
1985	Anbin Mugavari		
1985	Ambigai Neril Vanthaal		
1985	Uyarndha Ullam	Mani	
1985	Muthal Mariyathai	Rope-spinner	
1985	Marudhani		
1985	Vetrikani	Paneer Selvam	
1985	Sri Raghavendra	St. Sudeendrar's disciple	
1985	Puthiya Theerpu	Constable	
1985	Thiramai		
1985	Padikkadavan	Kabali	
1985	Sindhu Bhairavi	Tambura Musician	
1985	Aan Paavam	Kanagaraj	
1986	Vikram	Dubash Translator	
1986	Selvakku		
1986	Marakka Matten		
1986	Neethana Antha Kuyil		
1986	Anandha Kanneer		
1986	Isai Paadum Thendral		
1986	Kadalora Kavithaigal		
1986	Aayiram Pookkal Malarattum		
1986	Kaalamellam Unn Madiyil		
1986	Palaivana Rojakkal	Majunu	
1986	Oru Iniya Udhayam	Thavudu	
1987	Kadhal Parisu	Malini's uncle	
1987	Raja Mariyadhai	Hanumanthu	
1987	Kudumbam Oru Koyil		
1987	Valayal Satham		
1987	Vilangu		
1987	Makkal En Pakkam		
1987	Ini Oru Sudhanthiram		
1987	Vairagyam		
1987	Jallikattu	Janagaraj	
1987	Kaadhal Viduthalai		
1987	Theertha Karaiyinile	Panchayat	
1987	Nayakan	Selvam	
1987	Pookkal Vidum Thudhu	Murugesan	
1987	Neram Nalla Irukku		
1987	Vedham Pudhithu	Vaidehi's Suitor	
1988	Annanagar Mudhal Theru	Madhavan	
1988	Paimara Kappal		
1988	Poovukkul Boogambam		
1988	Urimai Geetham	Ezhumalai	
1988	Ullathil Nalla Ullam	Michael Raj's father	
1988	En Bommukutty Ammavukku	Lawyer	
1988	Agni Natchathiram	Lakshmipathi	
1988	Therkathi Kallan	Pandian	
1988	Ganam Courtar Avargale	Baski's mentor	
1988	Manasukkul Mathappu	Vasu	
1988	Jeeva	Dilli	
1988	Soora Samhaaram	Jana	
1988	Unnal Mudiyum Thambi		
1988	Nallavan	Madhu	
1988	Sathyaa	Naidu	
1988	Kodi Parakuthu	Chinna Dhadha	
1988	Kaliyugam		
1988	Paravaigal Palavitham	Shiva	
1988	Puthiya Vaanam	Pattabi	
1988	Nethiyadi	Mysore Manikam	
1989	Poo Manam		
1989	Oru Thottil Sabatham		
1989	Nalaya Manithan	Sergeant Shekar	
1989	En Purushanthaan Enakku Mattumthaan	Lawyer	
1989	Thaai Naadu	Samuel	
1989	Vaai Kozhuppu	Baskar	
1989	Varusham Padhinaaru	Rajamani	
1989	Moodu Manthiram		
1989	Rajadhi Raja	Sethupathi	
1989	Paattukku Oru Thalaivan	Vicky	
1989	En Rathathin Rathame		
1989	Apoorva Sagodharargal	Police Inspector	
1989	Siva		
1989	Kakka Kadi		
1989	Varusham 16	Rajamani	
1989	Manidhan Marivittan		
1989	Manandhal Mahadevan		
1989	Vetri Vizha	Cameo appearance	
1989	Pudhu Pudhu Arthangal	Jolly	
1989	Thiruppu Munai	Pichandi	
1989	Ponnu Pakka Poren	Balu	
1990	Idhaya Thamarai	Absence of mind man	
1990	Panakkaran	Sabapathy	
1990	Pachai Kodi	Kandasaamy	
1990	Arangetra Velai	Naidu	
1990	Seetha	Boopathy's father	
1990	Nila Pennae		
1990	Aarathi Edungadi	Kaaliyapatti Ramasamy	
1990	Seetha Geetha		
1990	Vellaiya Thevan		
1990	Sathan Sollai Thattathe	Gopinath	
1990	Kizhakku Vasal	Thayamma's father	
1990	Anjali	Watchman	
1990	Keladi Kanmani	Adaikkalam	
1990	Nee Sirithaal Deepavali		
1990	Vaigasi Poranthachu	Chinnarasu	
1990	Urudhi Mozhi	Jagan	
1990	Raja Kaiya Vacha	Raghu	
1990	Pudhiya Sarithiram		
1991	Naan Pudicha Mappillai	Pichayandi	
1991	Vetri Padigal	Govind	
1991	Gopura Vasalile	Bank clerk Pethaperumal	
1991	Thanga Thamaraigal		
1991	Nattai Thirudathey		
1991	Aatha Un Koyilile	Kaliappan	
1991	Kaaval Nilayam	Murali	
1991	Archana IAS	Perumalswamy	
1991	Pondatti Pondattithan	Kathiresan	
1991	Veetla Ezhi Velila Puli		
1991	Idhayam	Doctor	
1991	Manasara Vazhthungalen		
1991	Nee Pathi Naan Pathi	Ramasamy	
1991	Nattukku Oru Nallavan	Subhash's father	
1991	Vaasalile Oru Vennila		
1991	Gunaa	Gunaa's uncle	
1991	Thoothu Po Chellakkiliye	Headmaster Subramani	
1991	Kurumbukkaran		
1992	Rendu Pondatti Kaavalkaaran	Muthusamy	
1992	Naangal	Sundaram	
1992	Unna Nenachen Pattu Padichen	Nadaswara Vidwan	
1992	Nadodi Thendral		
1992	Unakkaga Piranthen	Radha's grandfather	
1992	Annaamalai	Panchachalam	
1992	Vasantha Malargal		
1992	Kalikaalam		
1992	Endrum Anbudan	Venkatachalam	
1992	Pattathu Raani	Viswanathan	
1992	Roja	Chajoo Maharaj	
1992	Brahmachari	Ganesan's uncle	
1992	Pandiyan	Vinayaga	
1992	Solaiyamma	Balraj's father	
1992	Meera	Comic Inspector	
1993	Thangakkili		
1993	Prathap	Rajappa	
1993	Vedan	McDowell	
1993	Pass Mark		
1993	Captain Magal	Inspector Paulraj	
1993	Nallathe Nadakkum	Rami	
1993	Parvathi Ennai Paradi	Venkatraman	
1993	Pathini Penn	Narayanan	
1993	Idhaya Nayagan	Jana	
1994	Veetla Visheshanga	Doctor Sree	
1994	Veettai Paaru Naattai Paaru	Politician	
1994	Purushanai Kaikkulla Pottukkanum		
1994	Pondattiye Deivam	Sundaram	
1994	Uzhiyan	Manickam	
1994	Veera	Rupa's father	
1994	Oru Vasantha Geetham		
1994	Sevvanthi		
1994	Thaatboot Thanjavur		
1994	May Madham	Captain	
1994	Karuththamma	Kaliamma's husband	
1994	Manju Virattu	Gnanam	
1995	Engirundho Vandhan	Manikandan	
1995	Oru Oorla Oru Rajakumari	Accountant Ekambaraeshwarar	
1995	Baashha	Gurumurthy	
1995	Gangai Karai Paattu	Puncture shop owner	
1995	Paattu Padava	Rangarajan	
1995	Thottil Kuzhandhai	Muthu	
1995	Puthiya Aatchi	Rajarathnam	
1995	Indira	Accountant	
1995	Thirumoorthy	Uma's father	
1995	Nandhavana Theru	Albert	
1995	Thedi Vandha Raasa	Vishwanath	
1995	Rajavin Parvaiyile	Pannaiyar	
1995	En Pondatti Nallava		
1996	Gopala Gopala	Kuzhanthaivel	
1997	Vaimaye Vellum	Michael	
1997	Arunachalam	Kathavarayan	
1997	Devathai	Keerthi's father	also singer for song "Kokkarakko Kozhi"
1997	Paththini		
1997	Vidukathai		
1997	Vasuki	Kabali	
1998	Ulavuthurai	Duraisamy	
1998	Udhavikku Varalaamaa	Annamalai	
1998	Kavalai Padathe Sagodhara		
1998	Harichandra	Doctor	
1998	Kumbakonam Gopalu	Lingamurthy	
1999	Ullathai Killathe	Chakravarthy	
1999	Annan Thangachi	Kodeeswaran	
1999	Suyamvaram	Mithrabuthan	
1999	Jodi	Nachimuthu	
2000	Seenu	Mani	
2000	Puratchikkaaran		
2001	Piriyadha Varam Vendum	Kannatha's neighbour	
2002	Dhaya	Selvaraj	
2002	Raajjiyam	Governor's PA	
2002	King	Shanmugam's father	
2002	Solla Marandha Kadhai	Mudhaliar	
2002	I Love You Da	Sadasivam	
2004	Jai		
2004	Aayutha Ezhuthu	Doctor	
2004	New	Doctor	
2004	M. Kumaran S/O Mahalakshmi	Police officer	
2005	Aayudham	Naga's uncle	
2006	Kalinga		
2006	47A Besant Nagar Varai		
2007	Mudhal Kanave	Jennifer's grandfather	
2007	Thavam	Mani	
2008	Pattaya Kelappu	Arunachalam	
2018	'96	Watchman/Kaaval Theivam	
2019	Dha Dha 87	Nayudu	
2021	Obama Ungalukkaga		
2024	Thatha	Thatha	Short film released on Shortflix
2024	Coins	—N/a	Music Video; Playback singer

=== Other language films ===
Year	Film	Role	Language	Ref.
1980	Red Rose	Servant	Hindi	
1990	No.20 Madras Mail	Murukesan	Malayalam	
1990	Jagadeka Veerudu Athiloka Sundari	Police inspector	Telugu	
1993	Sneha Sagaram	Pazhaniappan Gounder	Malayalam	
1993	Dhadi	Police Inspector	Telugu	
1994	Captain	Lakshmi Narayanan	Telugu	
1997	Rishyasringan		Malayalam	
1998	Dil Se..	Taxi Driver	Hindi	
2000	Hats Off India	Police constable	Kannada	
