= Kalyana Kalam =

- Title card
- Directed by: Robert–Rajasekar
- Screenplay by: Robert–Rajasekar
- Story by: S. Rajasekar
- Produced by: K. R. Kannan
- Starring: Janagaraj; Suhasini
- Cinematography: Robert–Rajasekar
- Edited by: D. Raj
- Music by: Shankar–Ganesh
- Production company: KRK Creations
- Release date: 26 January 1982
- Running time: 130 minutes
- Country: India
- Language: Tamil

Kalyana Kalam (transl. Period of marriages) is a 1982 Indian Tamil-language film directed by Robert–Rajasekar and produced by K. R. Kannan. The film stars Janagaraj and Suhasini, with P. S. Venkatachalam, K. K. Soundar, S. N. Parvathy, Janagaraj, Thyagu and Baby Geetha in supporting roles. It was released on 26 January 1982, and failed at the box office.

== Cast ==
- P. S. Venkatachalam
- K. K. Soundar
- S. N. Parvathy
- Janagaraj
- Thyagu
- Baby Geetha as Nithya
- Suhasini as Geetha

== Soundtrack ==
The soundtrack was composed by Shankar–Ganesh, with lyrics by Vairamuthu.

Track listing
No.	Title	Singer(s)	Length
1.	"Vazhum Samuthayame"	S. P. Balasubrahmanyam	4:44
2.	"Naanthane Mamavittu"	Malaysia Vasudevan	4:35
3.	"Adhikalaiyil Pani Kattrugal"	S. P. Balasubrahmanyam	4:39
4.	"Ungal Pathathil Entha Nerathil"	Vani Jairam	4:41
Total length:			18:39

== Reception ==
Thiraignani of Kalki panned the film, saying the only positive points were Suhasini's performance and the film's relatively short runtime.
