= Vellaiya Thevan =

- Theatrical release poster
- Directed by: Manoj Kumar
- Written by: Manoj Kumar; S. Ganesharaj (dialogues)
- Screenplay by: Manoj Kumar
- Produced by: Eknaath
- Starring: Ramki; Kanaka; Janagaraj; Chitra
- Cinematography: R. H. Ashok
- Edited by: Srinivas Krishna
- Music by: Ilaiyaraaja
- Production company: Eknaath Movie Creations
- Release date: 1 November 1990
- Country: India
- Language: Tamil

Vellaiya Thevan is a 1990 Indian Tamil-language film, directed by Manoj Kumar and produced by Eknaath. The film stars Ramki, Kanaka, Janagaraj and Chitra. It was released on 2 November 1990.

== Cast ==
- Ramki
- Kanaka
- Janagaraj
- Chitra
- Anandaraj
- Vijayakumar
- Harish
- Seema
- Pasi Sathya
- Singamuthu

== Soundtrack ==
The music was composed by Ilaiyaraaja.

Song	Singers	Lyrics	Length
"Nalla Isai Thattu"	S. Janaki	Piraisoodan	04:51
"Thangachi" (Happy)	Mano, K. S. Chithra	Vaali	04:27
"Uchi Malai"	K. S. Chitra	Vaali	04:33
"Vaanaththil Irunthu"	Arunmozhi, Uma Ramanan	Na. Kamarasan	05:23
"Kaagam"	K. S. Chitra	Vaali	00:58
"Poonthottam Varartheyn"	Mano	Vaali	01:15
"Akka Magalukku"	Mano	Vaali	00:53
"Akka Magalukku"	K. S. Chitra	Vaali	00:54
"Yetthi Vacha"	Ilaiyaraaja	Vaali	03:41

== Release and reception ==
Vellaiya Thevan was released on 2 November 1990. The Indian Express praised the film for its stunt sequences and Ilaiyaraaja's score. C. R. K. of Kalki felt the makers messed up with the story but called Ramki's acting, Anandraj's villainy, melting music, thrilling scenes taken from American films, excellent making as positive points.
