= Ilaya Ragam =

- Directed by: P. R. Devaraj
- Written by: Prasanna Kumar (dialogues)
- Story by: Sivaji Balaram
- Produced by: Sivaji Balaram
- Starring: Jothisankar; Sirisha
- Cinematography: M. M. Rangasami
- Edited by: R. T. Annadurai
- Music by: Ilaiyaraaja
- Production company: Pournami International Films
- Release date: 1 December 1995
- Country: India
- Language: Tamil

Ilaya Ragam (transl. Young raga) is a 1995 Indian Tamil-language romantic drama film directed by P. R. Devaraj, who previously directed Senthoora Poove (1988), his final film as director. The film stars newcomer Jothisankar and Sirisha. It was released on 1 December 1995.

== Cast ==
- Jothisankar as Raja
- Sirisha as Vanitha
- Vijayakumar as Vanitha's father
- Manjula as Vanitha's mother
- Nizhalgal Ravi
- Kavitha
- Vivek as Saamy
- Mimicry Sethu as Saamy's friend
- Sukran as Rajesh
- Raviraj
- Vaiyapuri
- Subramani
- Ponnambalam
- S. Rajasekar
- Nesan Napolean as college student
- Ramji as dancer in song "Marudhani Charu"

== Soundtrack ==
The music was composed by Ilaiyaraaja. A critic wrote that "Ilayaraja comes out with two pleasing numbers in ‘Naan onru kettaal’ (Arunmozhi and Chitra) and ‘Unnai naan sernthirukka’ (Mano and Chitra)".

Track listing
No.	Title	Lyrics	Singer(s)	Length
1.	"Pattikattu"	M. G. Vallabhan	Mano, K. S. Chithra	6:46
2.	"Unnai Naan Sernthirukka"	Mu. Metha	Mano, K. S. Chithra	3:10
3.	"Unnai Naan Sernthirukka (Sad Version)"	Ponnadiyan	Mano, K. S. Chithra	5:06
4.	"Naan Ondru Kettaal"	Mu. Metha	Arunmozhi, K. S. Chithra	5:13
5.	"Maruthani Charu"	Mu. Metha	Mano, K. S. Chithra	5:11
6.	"Adi Mathalam"	Kamakodiyan	Arunmozhi	5:08
Total length:				30:34

== Reception ==
D. S. Ramanujam of The Hindu wrote that "The undesirable effects ragging produces in higher educational institutions, mixed with a love story, forms the base for Pournami International's `Ilayaragam' where a tall newcomer Jothisankar, makes a fairly impressive debut".
