= Ramki =

Indian actor (born 1962)

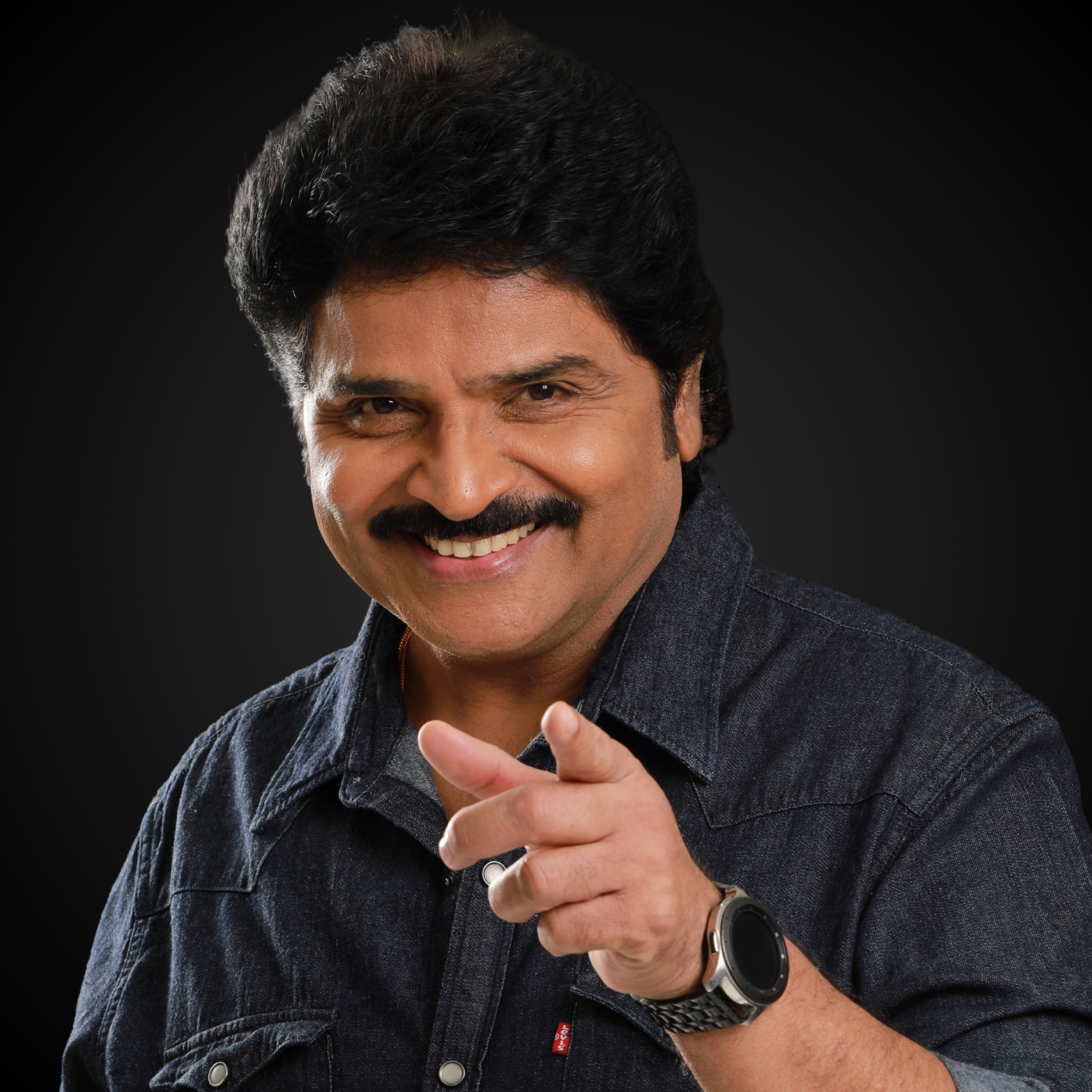
- Ramki
- Born: Ramakrishnan Arunachalam; 31 March 1962 (age 64); Sattur, Tamil Nadu, India
- Occupation: Actor
- Years active: 1987–2004; 2013–present
- Spouse: Nirosha (m. 1995)
- Relatives: Radhika Sarathkumar (sister-in-law)
- Awards: Santosham Film Award for Best Character Actor (2019)

Ramakrishnan Arunachalam (born 31 March 1962), known professionally as Ramki, is an Indian actor who works primarily in Tamil cinema (Kollywood) and Telugu cinema (Tollywood). He made his acting debut with the romantic drama Chinna Poove Mella Pesu (1987) and was a leading man in Tamil films from 1987 to 2004, appearing in over sixty films across the action, drama, horror and devotional genres. He was noted for his distinctive hairstyle and his frequent on-screen pairings with Nirosha, Khushbu and Urvashi.

His notable films as a lead include the blockbuster Senthoora Poove (1988), the rural action drama Maruthu Pandi (1990), the action-adventure Inaindha Kaigal (1990) and the horror successes Athma (1993), Mayabazar (1995) and Karuppu Roja (1996). After a nine-year hiatus, he returned to acting in a supporting role with the supernatural thriller Masani (2013) and has since established himself as a character actor in both Tamil and Telugu films. His performance in the Telugu film RX 100 (2018) won him the Santosham Film Award for Best Character Actor.

== Early life ==
Ramki was born Ramakrishnan Arunachalam on 31 March 1962 in Sattur, in the Virudhunagar district of Tamil Nadu.

== Career ==
=== Lead actor (1987–2004) ===
Ramki made his debut in 1987 with Chinna Poove Mella Pesu, appearing alongside Prabhu; the film was a commercial success. He appeared in eight films in 1988, including Senthoora Poove, in which he co-starred with Vijayakanth and his future wife Nirosha. The film ran for over 200 days in theatres and was among the highest-grossing Tamil films of the period. His other releases that year, Poovizhi Raja and Paravaigal Palavitham, received positive reviews. In 1989, he starred in Oru Thottil Sabadham, Ellame En Thangachi, Penn Buthi Mun Buthi, Yogam Rajayogam and En Kanavar.

Following the success of the rural drama Maruthu Pandi (1990), he starred the same year in the action-adventure Inaindha Kaigal, directed by N. K. Viswanathan, in the second lead role alongside Arun Pandian and Nirosha. The film opened to positive reviews and emerged a blockbuster. In 1991, he starred in Vetri Padigal, directed by Manobala, in which R. Sarathkumar played the antagonist.

Ramki became particularly associated with the horror film genre through a string of successes including Athma (1993), Thanga Pappa (1993), Mayabazar (1995) and Karuppu Roja (1996). In 1997, he appeared in Thaali Pudhusu, Kalyana Vaibhogam, Samrat, Thadayam and Pudhalvan. In 1999, he played the second lead in Nilave Mugam Kaattu alongside Karthik and Devayani, and made brief appearances in Poovellam Kettuppar (1999) and Kadhal Rojavae (2000).

In the early 2000s, Ramki played key roles in devotional films such as Palayathu Amman (2000), Sri Raja Rajeshwari (2001) and Padai Veetu Amman (2002). Kuttrapathirikai, directed by R. K. Selvamani and filmed in 1991, was finally released in 2007 after a fifteen-year delay, with some scenes removed.

=== Character roles (2013–present) ===
After a nine-year break from acting, Ramki returned in 2013 with the supernatural thriller Masani and Venkat Prabhu's Biriyani. In 2016, he appeared in Vaaimai and Atti. In 2017, he played a pivotal role in the Telugu film Aakatayi, followed by the lead role in the Tamil horror comedy Aangila Padam.

His performance in the Telugu romantic action drama RX 100 (2018) won him the Santosham Film Award for Best Character Actor, along with a SIIMA Award nomination for Best Supporting Actor – Telugu. He subsequently appeared in Sundar C's action thriller Action (2019) starring Vishal, and in the Ravi Teja-starrer Disco Raja (2020).

He played main roles in Vettai Naai (2021) and Gurumoorthi (2022), and appeared in Dhanush's Maaran (2022). In 2023, Ramki played an important role in Venkat Prabhu's Tamil–Telugu bilingual Custody, followed by a supporting role in the Dulquer Salmaan-starrer Lucky Baskhar (2024).

In 2026, he appeared in three Telugu releases: the rural drama Nilakanta (January), Harish Shankar's action comedy Ustaad Bhagat Singh (March), in which he played IG Ramesh Chandra alongside Pawan Kalyan, and the rural action drama Lenin (July), directed by Murali Kishor Abburu and starring Akhil Akkineni. His other projects include the Tamil film Rowdy Baby, directed by J. M. Raja Saravanan.

== Personal life ==
Ramki met Nirosha when the two were paired in films during the late 1980s, and they married in 1995. Nirosha is the daughter of actor M. R. Radha, and actress Radhika Sarathkumar is his sister-in-law.

== Filmography ==
=== Tamil films ===
| Year | Title | Role | Notes |
|---|---|---|---|
| 1987 | Chinna Poove Mella Pesu | Raja | Debut film; dubbed into Telugu as Abhishekam |
| 1987 | Thangachi | Raja | |
| 1988 | Irandil Ondru | Raja | Dubbed into Telugu as Goonda Police |
| 1988 | Ithu Engal Neethi | | |
| 1988 | Sigappu Thali | Inspector Paandi | |
| 1988 | Manaivi Oru Mandhiri | Jeeva | |
| 1988 | Senthoora Poove | Ashok | Dubbed into Telugu as Sindhura Puvvu |
| 1988 | Poovizhi Raja | Inspector Kumar | |
| 1988 | Paravaigal Palavitham | Sekar | |
| 1988 | Maduraikara Thambi | Chinna Thambi | |
| 1989 | Oru Thottil Sabadham | | Dubbed into Telugu as Samaram |
| 1989 | Ellame En Thangachi | Vasanth | |
| 1989 | Penn Buthi Mun Buthi | Muthupandi | |
| 1989 | Yogam Rajayogam | Siva | |
| 1989 | En Kanavar | | |
| 1990 | Maruthu Pandi | Maruthu Pandi / Manickam | |
| 1990 | Amma Pillai | Sathish | |
| 1990 | Inaindha Kaigal | Pratap | |
| 1990 | Vellaiya Thevan | Thevan | |
| 1990 | Pudhiya Sarithiram | Inspector Dinakaran / Raja | |
| 1990 | Vaazhnthu Kaattuvom | Vijay | |
| 1991 | Vetri Padigal | Mahesh | |
| 1991 | Pillai Paasam | | |
| 1991 | Manitha Jaathi | | |
| 1991 | En Pottukku Sonthakkaran | Chinna Paandi | |
| 1992 | Uyarndhavan | Mohan | |
| 1993 | Thanga Pappa | Lawrence | Guest appearance |
| 1993 | Pass Mark | Murali | Dubbed into Telugu as Allari Abbayi |
| 1993 | Athma | Saravanan / Vignesh | Dubbed into Telugu as Rathnagiri Ammoru |
| 1994 | Chinna Madam | Gopal | |
| 1994 | Ulavaali | Raja | Dubbed into Telugu as Bayankara Goodachari |
| 1994 | Vanaja Girija | Raja | |
| 1995 | Thottil Kuzhandhai | Pitchai | |
| 1995 | Mayabazar | Ram | |
| 1996 | Irattai Roja | Balu | |
| 1996 | Rajali | Jeeva | |
| 1996 | En Aasai Thangachi | Dorai | |
| 1996 | Enakkoru Magan Pirappan | Balu | |
| 1996 | Karuppu Roja | Aravind | |
| 1997 | Thaali Pudhusu | Arun | |
| 1997 | Dhinamum Ennai Gavani | ACP Jai Kumar | |
| 1997 | Kalyana Vaibhogam | Sakthi | |
| 1997 | Aahaa Enna Porutham | Raja | |
| 1997 | Samrat | Samrat / Ashok | |
| 1997 | Thadayam | Chandru (Chandrasekhar) | Dubbed into Telugu as Chattam |
| 1997 | Pudhalvan | Inspector Siva | |
| 1998 | Ellame En Pondattithaan | Muthu | |
| 1999 | Nilave Mugam Kaattu | Prakash | |
| 1999 | Poovellam Kettuppar | Himself | Cameo appearance |
| 2000 | Kadhal Rojavae | Himself | Special appearance |
| 2000 | Palayathu Amman | Shankar | Dubbed into Telugu as Devatha |
| 2001 | Sri Raja Rajeshwari | Raasaiyya | |
| 2001 | Viswanathan Ramamoorthy | Vishwanathan | |
| 2002 | Shakalaka Baby | Himself | Guest appearance |
| 2002 | Padai Veetu Amman | Shankar | |
| 2004 | Super Da | Kathirvel | |
| 2007 | Kuttrapathirikai | ACP Ramakrishnan | Filmed in 1991; released in 2007 |
| 2013 | Masani | Vetri | |
| 2013 | Biriyani | Vijaykrishna | |
| 2016 | Vaaimai | Thirumaaran IPS | |
| 2016 | Atti | Om Prakash | |
| 2017 | Aangila Padam | Rail Murugan | |
| 2018 | Koothan | Himself | Guest appearance |
| 2019 | Action | Saravanan | |
| 2021 | Vettai Naai | Bose | |
| 2022 | Maaran | Maaran's father | |
| 2022 | Gurumoorthi | Kandasamy | |
| 2023 | Custody | Maj. Gen. Philips Sathya Raj | Tamil–Telugu bilingual |
| 2026 | Idhayam Murali | Amudha's father | |
| 2026 | Rowdy Baby | | |

=== Telugu films ===
| Year | Film | Role | Notes |
|---|---|---|---|
| 1990 | Ghatana | Vijay | |
| 1992 | Bhale Khaideelu | Vijay | |
| 1992 | Doshi | Siva | Dubbed into Tamil as Rocky |
| 1997 | Osey Ramulamma | Narasimha | Special appearance; dubbed into Tamil as Adimai Penn |
| 1997 | Rowdy Durbar | Koti | Dubbed into Tamil as Thalapathi Kottai |
| 2017 | Aakatayi | Vikram Simha | |
| 2018 | RX 100 | Daddy | Won – Santosham Film Award for Best Character Actor – Telugu; Nominated – SIIMA Award for Best Supporting Actor – Telugu |
| 2020 | Disco Raja | Bharani | |
| 2023 | Custody | Maj. Gen. Philips Sathya Raj | Tamil–Telugu bilingual |
| 2024 | Lucky Baskhar | Anthony | |
2026
| 2026 | Ustaad Bhagat Singh | IG Ramesh Chandra | |
| 2026 | Lenin | Neelakantam | |

== Awards and nominations ==
| Year | Award | Category | Work | Result | Ref. |
|---|---|---|---|---|---|
| 2019 | Santosham Film Awards | Best Character Actor – Telugu | RX 100 | Won | |
| 2019 | SIIMA Awards | Best Supporting Actor – Telugu | RX 100 | Nominated | |
