= Dhooram Adhighamillai =

- Directed by: Robert–Rajasekar
- Written by: Prasannakumar (dialogues)
- Screenplay by: Robert–Rajasekar
- Produced by: B. N. Rengarajan
- Starring: Karthik; Viji
- Cinematography: Robert–Rajasekar
- Edited by: Rajan
- Music by: Shankar–Ganesh
- Production company: Annam Movies
- Release date: 9 December 1983
- Country: India
- Language: Tamil

Dhooram Adhighamillai (transl. Not so far) is a 1983 Indian Tamil-language film directed by Robert–Rajasekar, starring Karthik, Viji and Janagaraj. It was released on 9 December 1983.

== Plot ==
Meena, the lead actress in Manikam's drama troupe, creates trouble for him as her love life is affecting his business. Meena's lover and Manikam constantly try to outwit each other for their personal gains.

== Cast ==
- Karthik as Araamuthu
- Viji as Meena
- Janagaraj
- Samikannu
- G. Seenivasan
- Kumarimuthu
- Junior Balaiah
- Sathya
- Noorjahan
- Seethapatti
- R. Parthiban

== Production ==
The film was originally titled Sound Service.

== Soundtrack ==
The soundtrack was composed by Shankar–Ganesh.

Track listing
No.	Title	Singer(s)	Length
1.	"Ilanguyilin"	Vani Jairam
2.	"Naan Paadava"	S. Janaki
3.	"Jothiye Unai"	Vani Jairam
4.	"Oruthan Kadhalan"	Malaysia Vasudevan
5.	"Mudhal Murai"	S. P. Balasubrahmanyam, Vani Jairam

== Critical reception ==
Jayamanmadhan of Kalki wrote the screenplay feels crippled and dragged and concluded Robert–Rajasekar made a film for the young boys.
