= Vellai Subbaiah =

Indian actor

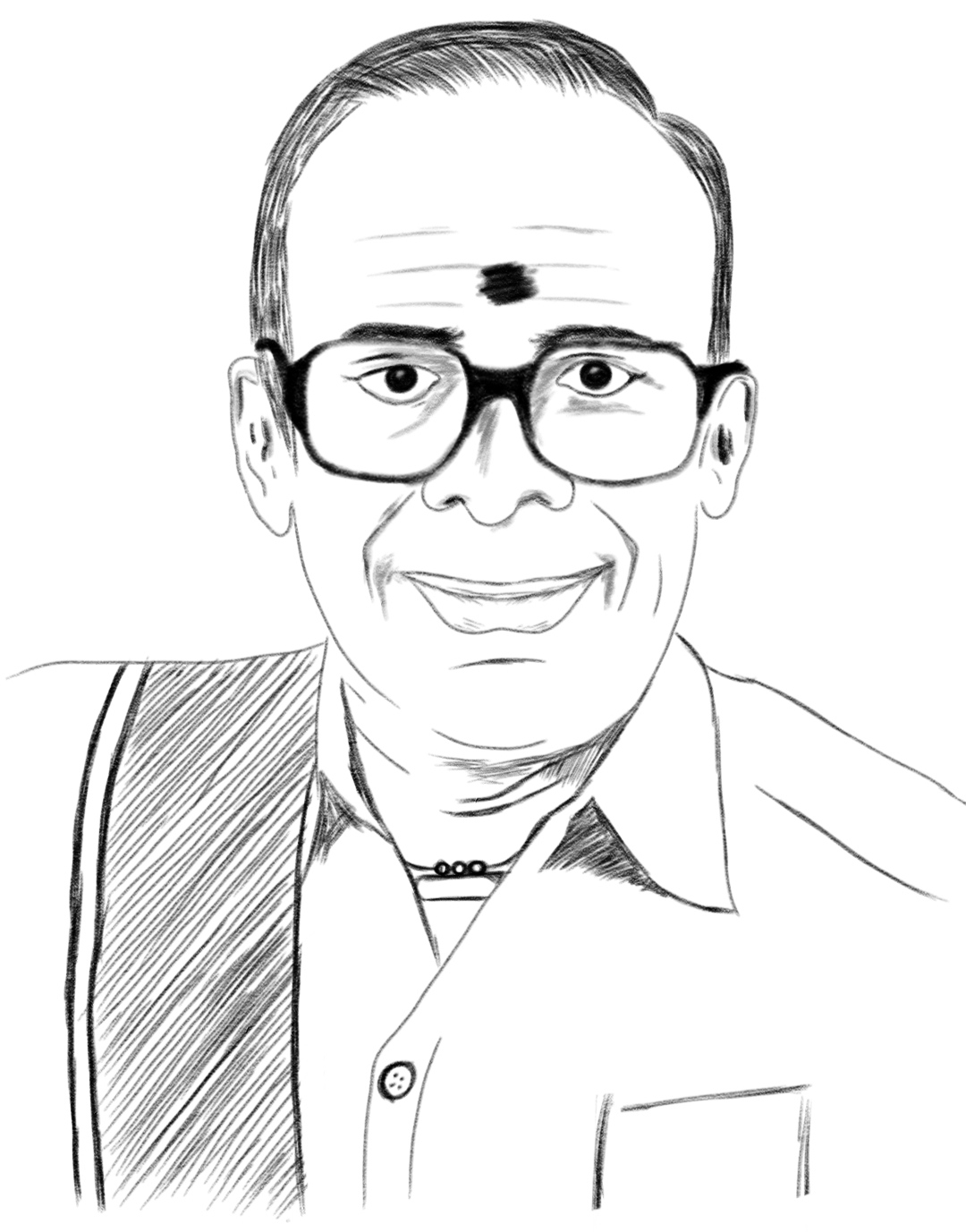
- Born: Subbaiah; 1937; Punjai Puliampatti, Erode
- Died: 6 September 2018 (80); Mettupalayam, Coimbatore
- Occupation: Actor
- Years active: 1964-2011
- Spouse: Savitri
- Children: 1

Vellai Subbaiah was an Indian actor who appeared in over than 1500 films and theatrical productions. He primarily played minor roles and comedic roles.

== Early life ==
Subbaiah was born in Punjai Puliampatti village, Coimbatore in 1937 but ran away from home at a young age to pursue his interest in acting. Sometime after running away from home he met a drama troupe owner in Anthiyur who offered him a job acting in the troupe.

== Film career ==
Later, Subbaiah travelled to Madras to pursue a career in cinema. His role was an uncredited appearance in the hugely successful drama Pasamalar. His first major role was as a student in the 1970 film Maanavan.

== Selected filmography ==
| Year | Film | Roles | Notes |
|---|---|---|---|
| 1964 | Aayiram Roobai | | |
| 1966 | Athai Magal | | |
| 1970 | Maanavan | Student | |
| 1972 | Annai Abhirami | | |
| 1976 | Unarchigal | | |
| 1977 | 16 Vayathinile | Astrologer | |
| 1977 | Yen | | |
| 1978 | Shankar Salim Simon | | |
| 1978 | Kizhakke Pogum Rail | | |
| 1979 | Ival Oru Seethai | | |
| 1979 | Thisai Maariya Paravaigal | | |
| 1981 | Alaigal Oivathillai | | |
| 1981 | Erattai Manithan | | |
| 1981 | Oruthi Mattam Karaiyinile | | |
| 1982 | Payanangal Mudivathillai | | |
| 1982 | Kaadhal Oviyam | | |
| 1982 | Mullillatha Roja | | |
| 1982 | Kozhi Koovuthu | | |
| 1983 | Manaivi Solle Manthiram | | |
| 1983 | Pozhuthu Vidinchachu | | |
| 1983 | Imaigal | | |
| 1983 | Samayapurathale Satchi | | |
| 1984 | Vaidehi Kathirunthal | Singer in the Coracle | |
| 1985 | Mannukketha Ponnu | Patient | |
| 1986 | Amman Kovil Kizhakale | | |
| 1986 | Neethana Antha Kuyil | | |
| 1987 | Uzhavan Magan | | |
| 1987 | Ninaive Oru Sangeetham | | |
| 1987 | Mannukkul Vairam | | |
| 1987 | Valayal Satham | | |
| 1988 | Senthoora Poove | | |
| 1989 | Rajadhi Raja | | |
| 1989 | Enne Petha Raasa | | |
| 1989 | Karakattakkaran | | |
| 1990 | Inaindha Kaigal | | |
| 1990 | Puthu Paatu | | |
| 1990 | Salem Vishnu | | |
| 1991 | Naadu Adhai Naadu | | |
| 1991 | Thangamana Thangachi | | |
| 1991 | Vetri Padigal | | |
| 1992 | Mannan | Factory Worker | |
| 1992 | Pattathu Raani | | |
| 1992 | Thirumathi Palanisamy | | |
| 1992 | Natchathira Nayagan | | |
| 1993 | Karuppu Vellai | | |
| 1993 | Mutrugai | | |
| 1993 | Enga Muthalali | | |
| 1993 | Aranmanai Kaavalan | | |
| 1993 | Rajadhi Raja Raja Kulothunga Raja Marthanda Raja Gambeera Kathavaraya Krishna Kamarajan | | |
| 1993 | Rajadurai | | |
| 1993 | Moondravadhu Kann | | |
| 1994 | Amaidhi Padai | Astrologer | |
| 1994 | Thamarai | | |
| 1994 | Sevatha Ponnu | | |
| 1994 | Nila | | |
| 1994 | Killadi Mappillai | | |
| 1994 | Mani Rathnam | | |
| 1995 | Karuppu Nila | | |
| 1995 | Thottil Kuzhandhai | | |
| 1995 | Neela Kuyil | | |
| 1995 | Ellame En Rasathan | | |
| 1995 | Thamizhachi | | |
| 1995 | Chinna Mani | | |
| 1995 | En Pondatti Nallava | | |
| 1996 | Aruva Velu | | |
| 1996 | Vasantha Vaasal | | |
| 1996 | Take It Easy Urvashi | | |
| 1997 | Gopura Deepam | | |
| 1997 | Nesam Pudhusu | | |
| 1997 | Themmangu Paattukaaran | | |
| 1997 | Thaali Pudhusu | | |
| 1998 | Moovendhar | | |
| 1998 | Kannathal | | |
| 1998 | Senthooram | | |
| 1999 | Sundari Neeyum Sundaran Naanum | | |
| 1999 | Unakkaga Ellam Unakkaga | Indhu's relative | |
| 2000 | Vallarasu | Man at the wedding hall | |
| 2001 | Seerivarum Kaalai | | |
| 2001 | Kottai Mariamman | | |
| 2002 | Thamizhan | Train ticket collector | Uncredited |
| 2002 | Bagavathi | | |
| 2003 | Vaseegara | Wedding priest | Uncredited |
| 2003 | Galatta Ganapathy | | |
| 2004 | Ennavo Pudichirukku | | |
| 2004 | Kadhale Jayam | | |
| 2004 | Attahasam | | Uncredited |
| 2005 | Thirupaachi | | |
| 2005 | Varapogum Sooriyane | | |
| 2005 | Kaatrullavarai | | |
| 2006 | Bangaram | | Telugu film |
| 2006 | Theenda Theenda | Villager | |
| 2006 | Sasanam | | |
| 2007 | Urchagam | | |
| 2007 | Vasantham Vanthachu | Nattamai | |
| 2008 | Dindigul Sarathy | | |
| 2008 | Pudhusu Kanna Pudhusu | | |
| 2009 | Pinju Manasu | | |
| 2009 | Thottu Sellum Thendrale | | |
| 2009 | Kannukulle | | |
| 2011 | Gurusamy | | |
| 2014 | Nenjirukkumvarai Ninaivirukkum | | |
