= White Rainbow (film) =

2005 Indian film

- Official poster
- Directed by: Dharan Mandrayar
- Written by: Dharan Mandrayar
- Produced by: Hannah Kirby; Linda Mandrayar
- Starring: Sonali Kulkarni; Amardeep Jha; Shameem Shaikh; Amruta Subhash
- Cinematography: B. Kannan
- Edited by: B. Lenin
- Production company: Dharlin Entertainment
- Distributed by: Prabhu Movies
- Release dates: 6 October 2004 (Mill Valley Film Festival); 5 August 2005 (India); 7 April 2006 (U.S.)
- Running time: 92–94 minutes (Note: While Half Moon Bay Review gave the runtime as 92 minutes, The San Diego Union-Tribune gave the runtime as 94 minutes.)
- Countries: India; United States
- Language: Hindi

White Rainbow (also known as Shwet) is an Indian Hindi-language film directed by Dharan Mandrayar and starring Sonali Kulkarni, Amardeep Jha, Shameem Shaikh, and Amruta Subhash. The film is about the widows of Vrindavan: women who are married off at a young age, lost their husbands due to illness and wear white waiting to return with them in the afterlife. Several of these women are forced out of their house since they rejected a second marriage. The film follows four different widows.

In 2013, Linda Mandrayar founded The White Rainbow Project that helps the widows of Vrindavan make handcrafted clothing and accessories from recycled saris.

== Cast ==
- Sonali Kulkarni as Priya Giri
- Amardeep Jha as Roop
- Shameem Shaikh as Mala
- Amruta Subhash as Deepthi
- Gaurav Kapoor as Gaurav Kapoor
- Virendra Saxena as Pramod Panda
- Amitabh Srivastava as Lal
- Mohan Raman as Balaji Srinivasan
- Shabbir Khan as Priya's friend's husband

The first assistant director and the post-production supervisor, Santhana Bharathi and R. S. Shivaji, make a cameo appearance as a priest and peon, respectively.

== Production ==
Linda Mandrayar first learned about the widows of Vrindavan from her son's reading assignment Homeless Bird by Gloria Whelan and her husband Dharan Mandrayar decided to make a film about them.

The film was named White Rainbow because Dharan Mandrayar felt that the widows still have lot of life in them. The film began production after Water's (a film also about the Vrindavan widows) shooting was halted in 1999. Mandrayar was inspired to make this film after he read about a 13-year-old widow who was forced to go to Vrindavan. Seema Biswas, who starred in Water, declined the offer to star in this film on the basis that both films are similar.

== Reception ==
A critic from The Hindu wrote that "Making a film on the plight of widows in a part of our country calls for strong conviction. Creator Dharan Mandrayar and Prabhu Movies have it in plenty. Otherwise they couldn't have taken up the subject and laid bare the stigma, subjugation and disgrace the husbandless face in a so-called pious milieu". Dennis Harvey of Variety opined that "But writer-helmer Dharan Mandrayar lets episodic pic flatline between excessively melodramatic peaks; fans of florid bad acting will find the ham cut thick here. Tech aspects are decent". A critic from Bollywood Hungama opined that "On the whole, SHWET - WHITE RAINBOW is a poor fare. At the box-office, it's a loser all the way".

A critic from the Deccan Chronicle rated the film four out of five stars and wrote that "The writer/director Dharan Mandrayar should be commended for taking up such a controversial subject and portraying it effectively on screen". A critic from The Economic Times wrote that "The film effectively attempts to highlight the plight of the widows in our society. Director Dharan Mandrayar, nephew of late Sivaji Ganesan should be applauded for the brave and sincere efforts".

== Accolades ==
The film won Best Feature Film at the Sedona International Film Festival.
