= Robert–Rajasekar =

Indian filmmaking duo

- Robert (left) and Rajasekar (right)
- Died: Robert: 11 July 2018; Rajasekar: 8 September 2019
- Occupations: Film directors cinematographers
- Years active: 1979–2019

Robert–Rajasekar was an Indian filmmaking duo consisting of Robert Asirvatham and S. Rajasekar. They were active in film direction and cinematography in Tamil cinema of the 1980s. The duo are regarded to have ushered a "new wave" in Tamil cinema.

== Career ==
In the 1970s, Robert Asirvatham and S. Rajasekar graduated as cameramen from the Madras Film Institute. They debuted as cinematographers with Kudisai (1979), a low budget film directed by Jayabharathi, also from the institute. Robert–Rajasekar's next film was to be Naalai Ulagam Namadhe, which was never completed. They were later hired to work in Oru Thalai Ragam (1980), which emerged a major success and a breakthrough in their career. Robert–Rajasekar made their directorial debut with Palaivana Solai (1981), where they also wrote the screenplay (based on Rajasekar's story) and continued as cinematographers. The film was a success, and they received more directorial offers. Their next directorial venture Kalyana Kalam (1982), however, became a box-office bomb. After two years of no work, they were offered to direct Chinna Poove Mella Pesu (1987) which emerged a success, and revitalised their career. In 2008, Robert–Rajasekar made their television debut by directing some episodes of Naanal.

== Deaths ==
Robert died on 30 November 2018, and Rajasekar on 8 September 2019.

== Filmography ==
Year	Title	Worked as		Notes	Ref.
Year	Title	Cinematographer	Director	Notes	Ref.
1979	Kudisai	Yes			
1980	Oru Thalai Ragam	Yes			
1981	Palaivana Solai	Yes	Yes		
1982	Kalyana Kalam	Yes	Yes		
1983	Dhooram Adhighamillai	Yes	Yes		
1987	Chinna Poove Mella Pesu	Yes	Yes		
1988	Manasukkul Mathappu	Yes	Yes		
1988	Paravaigal Palavitham	Yes	Yes		
2008	Naanal		Yes	TV series	
