= Chinna Poove Mella Pesu =

- Poster
- Directed by: Robert–Rajasekar
- Written by: Robert–Rajasekhar
- Produced by: S. K. Rajagopal; Annadurai Kannadhasan
- Starring: Prabhu; Ramki; Narmadha; Sudha Chandran; Sabitha Anand
- Cinematography: Robert–Rajasekar
- Edited by: R. T. Annadurai
- Music by: S. A. Rajkumar
- Production company: Esskay Films Combines
- Release date: 17 April 1987
- Running time: 150 minutes
- Country: India
- Language: Tamil

Chinna Poove Mella Pesu (transl. Please speak, little flower) is a 1987 Indian Tamil-language romantic drama film directed by Robert–Rajasekar. The film stars Prabhu, Ramki, Narmadha, Sudha Chandran and Sabitha Anand. It was released on 17 April 1987 and became highly successful at the box office. The film marked the debut of Ramki and composer S. A. Rajkumar.

== Plot ==
Raja, a clever student, challenges Rekha, a rich and arrogant girl, to become the number one student. She loses her challenge but she falls in love with Raja.

David, a former student, is now an alcoholic. During his college days, he fell in love with Esther. Meanwhile, Shanthi was in love with David. Michael, Esther's father, was against their love so he nearly beat David to death. Esther thinks that David has died and commits suicide. However, David later survives. David decides to help the young lovers and to fight against the heartless Michael.

== Cast ==
- Prabhu as David
- Ramki as Raja
- Narmadha as Rekha
- Sudha Chandran as Shanthi
- Roshni as Anitha
- Sabitha Anand as Esther
- Shubha
- Senthamarai as Michael
- Chinni Jayanth as Arokiyam
- Kumarimuthu as Arokiyam's father
- Swaminathan as Boopathy
- Annadurai Kannadhasan as Priest

== Production ==
Though Robert–Rajasekar wanted newcomers for the film, they yielded to the producer's wish to cast an established actor. R. Sarathkumar was originally cast as the lead actor, but was replaced by Prabhu.

== Soundtrack ==
The music was composed by S. A. Rajkumar in his debut. He also wrote the lyrics. Over one-and-a-half lakh cassettes were sold as of September 1987.

Track listing
No.	Title	Singer(s)	Length
1.	"Chinna Poove"	P. Jayachandran	04:40
2.	"Collegil Test"	Sundarrajan	04:14
3.	"Ennada Kathal"	Malaysia Vasudevan	04:36
4.	"Kanne Vaa"	Dinesh	02:48
5.	"Kanneer Sindhum"	S. P. Balasubrahmanyam	04:52
6.	"Poongatrilaadum"	Malaysia Vasudevan	04:43
7.	"Sangeetha Vanil"	S. P. Balasubrahmanyam, Vani Jairam	04:45
8.	"Thotta Idam"	S. P. Sailaja, S. P. Balasubrahmanyam	04:09
9.	"Vangadi Vangadi"	Malaysia Vasudevan, S. P. Sailaja	04:05
10.	"Yea Pulle Karuppayi"	S. A. Rajkumar	03:34
Total length:			42:26

== Reception ==
On 1 May 1987, V. Krishnaswamy of The Indian Express said, "Chinna Poove Mella Pesu is one of the best releases of the season. It does have some contrived sequences, but they are contrived well, and firmly establish Robert–Rajasekar as technicians of calibre." Jayamanmadhan of Kalki praised Robert–Rajasekar for succeeding in narrating the story vibrantly without defying the cliches of Tamil cinema while also praising Rajkumar's music and concluded calling it a film which cannot be sure whether it is a passenger or express.
