= Vadivelu filmography =

List of films in which Vadivelu has appeared

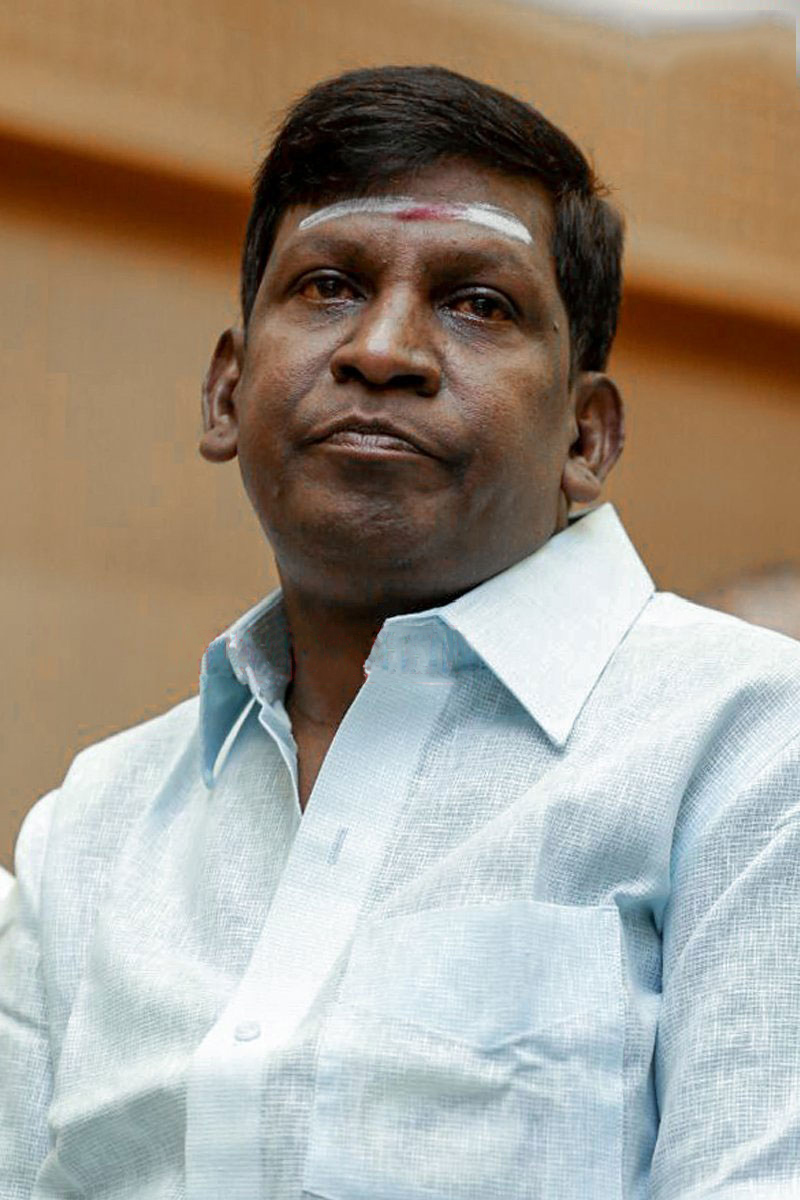
Vadivelu in Eli's "Talking Eli App" Launch Press Meet

Vadivelu is an Indian actor, comedian and playback singer. Since the 1990s, he has acted mainly as a comedian in Tamil cinema and is renowned for his slapstick comedies. Vadivelu has won the Cinema Express Award for Best Comedy Actor for Kizhakku Cheemayile (1993) as well as the Tamil Nadu State Film Award for Best Comedian five times for his works in Kaalam Maari Pochu (1996), Vetri Kodi Kattu (2000), Thavasi (2001), Imsai Arasan 23m Pulikesi (2006) and Kathavarayan (2008). He has also won the Filmfare Award for Best Comedian – Tamil two times for his work in Chandramukhi (2005) and Imsai Arasan 23rd Pulikecei (2006). He has won the Vikatan Award for Best Comedian in Pokkiri (2007). He also won the Vijay Award for Best Comedian for his work in Marudhamalai (2007) and was nominated three times in the Best Comedian category for his work in Aadhavan (2009), Nagaram (2010) and Kaavalan (2011). He has acted as a hero in seven films in Imsai Arasan 23rd Pulikecei (2006), Indiralohathil Na Azhagappan (2008), Tenaliraman (2014), Eli (2015), Naai Sekar Returns (2022), Maamannan (2023) and Maareesan (2025).

== Films ==
Year	Film	Role	Notes	Ref(s)
1988	En Thangai Kalyani	Cyclist	Uncredited role	
1991	En Rasavin Manasile	Vadivelu		
1991	Aatha Un Koyilile	Appu		
1992	Chinna Gounder	Maakhali		
1992	Ilavarasan	Kiya Kiya Karate master's translator		
1992	Singaravelan	Sabha		
1992	Deiva Vaakku	Karuvadu		
1992	Thevar Magan	Esaki		
1993	Koyil Kaalai	Vadivelu		
1993	Ezhai Jaathi	Villager	Guest appearance	
1993	Maharasan	Kasappu Kadai Vadivelu's assistant		
1993	Aranmanai Kili	Kaththayya		
1993	Ponnumani	Sadaiyandi		
1993	Thaai Ullam		Tamil dubbed film	
1993	Gokulam	Raju		
1993	Sakkarai Devan			
1993	Maravan	Constable Velu		
1993	Valli	Shiva		
1993	Kizhakku Cheemayile	Ochchu	Winner, Cinema Express Award for Best Comedy Actor	
1993	Kathirukka Neramillai	Raju's Friend		
1993	Rojavai Killathe	Ayyanar's accomplice		
1994	Rajakumaran	'Veecharuva' Veerasamy		
1994	Sindhu Nathi Poo	Nadesan		
1994	Adharmam	Pithalai		
1994	Varavu Ettana Selavu Pathana	Peter		
1994	Sevatha Ponnu			
1994	Watchman Vadivel			
1994	Killadi Mappillai			
1994	Raja Pandi			
1994	Kaadhalan	Vasanth (Kaliaperumal)		
1994	Ilaignar Ani			
1994	Mani Rathnam	Chappani		
1994	Pavithra	Thenmozhi's husband		
1994	Karuththamma	Sevalaikaalai		
1994	Pandiyanin Rajiyathil			
1994	Atha Maga Rathiname			
1994	Maindhan			
1995	Naan Petha Magane			
1995	Kizhakku Malai			
1995	Muthu Kaalai	Poochi		
1995	Chinna Mani	Pechimuthu		
1995	Aanazhagan	Marudhamalai		
1995	Udhavum Karangal			
1995	Ellame En Rasathan	Vadivelu		
1995	En Pondatti Nallava			
1995	Pasumpon	Solai		
1995	Nandhavana Theru	Theekuchi		
1995	Chellakannu			
1995	Sandaikku Vantha Kili			
1995	Rajavin Parvaiyile	Arivazhagan		
1995	Raasaiyya	Kili		
1995	Aasai	Jeevanantham's Friend		
1995	Thaikulame Thaikulame	Tamilpitthan		
1995	Chandralekha	Sundaram		
1995	Muthu	Valayapathy		
1995	Neela Kuyil	Mambattiyan		
1996	Love Birds	Raja		
1996	Vasantha Vaasal	Velu		
1996	Kaalam Maari Pochu	Sekar	Winner, Tamil Nadu State Film Award for Best Comedian	
1996	Sengottai		Guest appearance	
1996	Minor Mappillai	'Kuppathotti' Govindasamy		
1996	Sundara Purushan	Ganesan's brother		
1996	Tamizh Selvan	Manuneethi Sozhan		
1996	Priyam			
1996	Kadhal Desam	Wilson		
1996	Namma Ooru Raasa	Nattamai		
1996	Subash	Subash's friend		
1996	Mr. Romeo	Vavvaal		
1996	Paanchaalankurichi	Murugan		
1996	Thilagavathi CBI	Devaraj	Tamil dubbed film	
1997	Sakthi	Irulandi		
1997	Bharathi Kannamma	Eenamuthu		
1997	Mappillai Gounder	Muthan		
1997	Vivasaayi Magan	Dharman		
1997	Akka		Tamil dubbed film	
1997	My India			
1997	Raasi	Chidhambaram		
1997	Ganga Gowri	Vichu		
1997	Pongalo Pongal	Vellaichamy		
1997	Pasamulla Pandiyare	Kuppusamy		
1997	Kaadhali			
1997	Adimai Changili			
1997	Adra Sakka Adra Sakka			
1997	Kalyana Vaibhogam	Jacky		
1997	Aaro Pranam	Chanti's friend	Telugu film	
1997	Periya Manushan	Chellappa		
1997	Porkkaalam			
1997	Ratchagan	Ajay's friend		
1997	Thadayam	Neethi		
1998	Sundara Pandian	Pavadai		
1998	Kaathala Kaathala	'Security' Singaram		
1998	Ponnu Velayira Bhoomi	Amavasai		
1998	Jolly			
1998	Rathna	'Kathai' Kandhasamy		
1998	Iniyavale	Murugan		
1998	Poonthottam	Auto driver		
1998	Ellame En Pondattithaan	Ganga		
1998	Pudhumai Pithan	'Super' Suruli		
1998	Ponmaanai Thedi			
1998	Kannathal	Soonaa Paanaa (Subbiah Pandian)		
1998	Thalaimurai			
1998	Cheran Chozhan Pandian	Pandian		
1998	Sivappu Nila	Thirteen Seventy-Four		
1999	House Full	Vadivelu		
1999	Thodarum	'Peon' Mani		
1999	Maya			
1999	En Swasa Kaatre			
1999	Monisha En Monalisa			
1999	Nilave Mugam Kaattu			
1999	Poomaname Vaa			
1999	Rajasthan			
1999	Kummi Paattu			
1999	Anantha Poongatre	Subramani		
1999	Oruvan			
1999	Sangamam	Haridas		
1999	Viralukketha Veekkam	Kabali		
1999	Poovellam Kettuppar	Krishna's cousin		
1999	Manaivikku Mariyadhai	Terror Rajappa		
1999	Nesam Pudhusu	Velu		
1999	Mudhalvan	Palavesham		
1999	Iraniyan	Chinnasamy		
1999	Thirupathi Ezhumalai Venkatesa	Thirupathi		
1999	Unnaruge Naan Irundhal	Vadivelu		
1999	Paattali	Vadivu		
2000	Kakkai Siraginilae			
2000	Vallarasu		Guest appearance	
2000	Rajakali Amman	Gopal		
2000	Kandha Kadamba Kathir Vela	Vadivelan		
2000	Magalirkkaga	Bhoopathy		
2000	Ennamma Kannu	SP Telex Pandian IPS / 'Setup' Chellappa		
2000	Vetri Kodi Kattu	Sudalai	Winner, Tamil Nadu State Film Award for Best Comedian	
2000	Koodi Vazhnthal Kodi Nanmai	'Boxer' Krishnan		
2000	Maayi	Mokkaisamy		
2000	Chinna Chinna Kannile	Velan		
2000	Kannukku Kannaga	Velu		
2000	Vanna Thamizh Pattu	Velu		
2000	Manu Needhi	Sevalai		
2000	Nee Enthan Vaanam	Ottaiodasal		
2000	Kannula Kaasu Kattappa	Punniyakodi		
2001	Friends	Nesamani		
2001	Looty	Vellaiappa		
2001	Nageshwari			
2001	Engalukkum Kaalam Varum	Vellaiyan		
2001	En Purushan Kuzhandhai Maadhiri	Angusamy		
2001	Sri Raja Rajeshwari	Minor Pandian (MP)		
2001	Asathal	Venugopal		
2001	Middle Class Madhavan	Kuzhandaivelu		
2001	Sonnal Thaan Kaadhala	Roja's Brother-In-Law		
2001	Dosth	Bomb Bakri	Special appearance	
2001	Narasimha	Lala		
2001	Ninaikkatha Naalillai	'Aana Oona' Townmani		
2001	Maayan			
2001	Mitta Miraasu	Rangasamy		
2001	Love Marriage	Chitti Babu		
2001	Manadhai Thirudivittai	Steve Waugh, Mark Waugh, Mr. Waugh, and Mrs. Waugh		
2001	Thavasi	Azhagu	Winner, Tamil Nadu State Film Award for Best Comedian	
2001	Vadagupatti Maapillai	'Naataamai' Veerapandi		
2002	Gounder Veettu Maappillai	'Vetti' Veru	Tamil dubbed film	
2002	Kamarasu	Velu		
2002	Sri Bannari Amman	Kozhakatta Govindan		
2002	Raajjiyam	Sengal		
2002	Thamizh	Moorthy		
2002	Idhayame	Gurusamy		
2002	Raja	Sappai		
2002	Shree	Maruvesham Marimuthu		
2002	Karmegham	Khanja		
2002	Super Aunty	Krishnan	Tamil dubbed film	
2002	Naina	Aavudaiyappan		
2002	Sundhara Travels	Azhagappan (Azhagu, Azhagaa)		
2002	King	Hollywood director		
2002	En Mana Vaanil	Govindan		
2002	Namma Veetu Kalyanam	Sengalvarayan		
2002	Bagavathi	Vadivelu / Vibration		
2002	Style	Manmadhan		
2002	Shakalaka Baby	Pandi		
2003	Vaseegara	Kattabomman		
2003	Anbu	Subbaiah		
2003	Ilasu Pudhusu Ravusu	A. Swaminathan / Muniyandi		
2003	Arasu	Pichumani		
2003	Punnagai Poove	Aarumugam		
2003	Inidhu Inidhu Kadhal Inidhu	Karuppu		
2003	Eera Nilam	Sonai		
2003	Diwan	Velu		
2003	Aalukkoru Aasai	Pazhani		
2003	Winner	Kaipulla	Nominated, Filmfare Award for Best Comedian – Tamil	
2003	Ottran	Madasamy		
2003	Kadhal Kirukkan	Kalyanasundaram		
2003	Thathi Thavadhu Manasu	Inspector Vaigaivel		
2004	Engal Anna	Mayilsamy (Mayil)		
2004	Kovil	'Bullet' Pandi		
2004	Gambeeram	Oomathurai P.C.		
2004	Kadhal Dot Com	Pichu		
2004	Nee Mattum	Yogarasu		
2004	Arul	Thangam		
2004	Jore	Thirupathi		
2004	Maanasthan	Pachaikkili		
2004	Loves			
2004	Sound Party			
2004	Oru Murai Sollividu	Harichandran		
2004	Madhurey	Pandu		
2004	Giri	Veerabhagu		
2004	Kadhale Jayam	Pachaikaalai		
2004	Chatrapathy	Kili		
2004	Aai	Pazhani		
2004	Jananam			
2004	Jaisurya	Soosai		
2005	Aayudham	Thangapandi		
2005	Ayya	Karasingam A.C		
2005	Mannin Maindhan	'Water' Vadivelu		
2005	London	Vedimuthu		
2005	Chandramukhi	Murugesan	Winner, Filmfare Award for Best Comedian – Tamil	
2005	Sachein	Ayyasamy		
2005	Karka Kasadara	Ondippuli		
2005	6'2	Mr. White		
2005	Englishkaran	'Theeppori' Thirumugam		
2005	Kaatrullavarai	"Watchman" Venkatesh		
2005	Chinna	Kumar		
2005	February 14	Ezhumalai		
2005	Daas	Navagragam		
2005	ABCD	Muthukumar		
2005	Anda Naal Nyabagam			
2005	Chanakya	Subramani		
2005	Mazhai	Aarumugam		
2005	Kundakka Mandakka	Chellappa		
2005	Majaa	Pulipandi		
2005	Bambara Kannaley	Kadalaimuthu		
2005	Aanai			
2005	Aaru	Sundi Modhiram (Sumo)		
2005	Vetrivel Sakthivel	Dhandapani		
2005	Veeranna	Pazhanisamy		
2006	Pasa Kiligal	Kathavarayan		
2006	Thambi	Nadarasu		
2006	Kovai Brothers	Ekadasi		
2006	Thalai Nagaram	Naai Sekar		
2006	Kusthi	Velu		
2006	Imsai Arasan 23rd Pulikecei	Pulikecei XXIII / Ukraputhan	Winner, Tamil Nadu State Film Award for Best Comedian; Winner, Filmfare Award for Best Comedian – Tamil	
2006	Thimiru	'Warden' Vallaran		
2006	Kurukshetram	Nondippuli		
2006	Em Magan	Karupatti	Nominated, Filmfare Award for Best Supporting Actor – Tamil	
2006	Sillunu Oru Kaadhal	Vellaichamy		
2006	Thalaimagan	Erimalai/Panimalai		
2006	Vathiyar	Ayyanar		
2006	Rendu	Kirikalan		
2006	Nenjil	Vellam (Tamilman) / Englishman		
2006	Kumaran	Hotel Server	Tamil dubbed film	
2006	Desiya Paravai	Azhagu		
2007	Pokkiri	Body Soda	Winner, Ananda Vikatan Cinema Award for Best Comedian	
2007	Muruga	'Courier' Gopu		
2007	Manikanda	Madhayaanai		
2007	Viyabari	'Digil' Paandi		
2007	Karuppusamy Kuththagaithaarar	'Padithurai' Paandi		
2007	Maa Madurai	Thangavelu		
2007	Thottal Poo Malarum	Kabali Khan (Kabaliswaran)		
2007	Arya	'Snake' Babu		
2007	Cheena Thaana 001	Cheenichamy		
2007	Marudhamalai	'Encounter' Ekaambaram	Winner, Vijay Award for Best Comedian	
2007	Piragu	Samarasam		
2007	Thavam	Keeripulla		
2007	Vel	Kuzhandhaisamy		
2008	Indiralohathil Na Azhagappan	Indran / Yama Dharmarajan / Na. Azhagappan		
2008	Theekuchi	Kuravan		
2008	Kannum Kannum	Udumban		
2008	Kathavarayan	'Kanduvetti' Karuppu	Winner, Tamil Nadu State Film Award for Best Comedian	
2008	Muniyandi Vilangial Moonramandu	Sorimuthu Ayyanar		
2008	Kuselan	'Saloon Kadai' Shanmugam		
2008	Kee Mu	Madasami		
2008	Pachai Nirame	Paandi	Scenes used from an unreleased film	
2008	Seval	'Thabal' Thangavelu		
2008	Ellam Avan Seyal	Vandu Murugan		
2009	Villu	Madasamy		
2009	Vedigundu Murugesan	'Alert' Arumugam		
2009	Azhagar Malai	Kaththamuthu		
2009	Kanthaswamy	'Thengakadai' Thennappan		
2009	Peraanmai	Soosai		
2009	Jaganmohini	Jaganmohan		
2009	Aadhavan	Bannerjee ("Banner" Kuppan)	Nominated, Vijay Award for Best Comedian; Nominated, Filmfare Award for Best Supporting Actor – Tamil	
2010	Kacheri Arambam	Deepavali		
2010	Sura	Umbrella		
2010	Thillalangadi	Jackson		
2010	Nagaram Marupakkam	'Style' Pandi	Nominated, Vijay Award for Best Comedian	
2011	Ilaignan	Isaac		
2011	Kaavalan	Ammavasai	Nominated, Vijay Award for Best Comedian; Nominated, SIIMA Award for Best Comedian	
2011	Thoonga Nagaram		Narrator and cameo appearance in song "Vaigai Siricha"	
2011	Mambattiyan	'Silk' Singaram		
2012	Marupadiyum Oru Kadhal	Dr. Singaram		
2014	Tenaliraman	Tenaliraman / Maamannar		
2015	Eli	Eli Saamy		
2016	Kaththi Sandai	Dr. Boothri		
2017	Shivalinga	Pattukunjam		
2017	Mersal	Vadivu		
2022	Naai Sekar Returns	Naai Sekar		
2023	Maamannan	Maamannan	Nominated, Filmfare Award for Best Actor – Tamil	
2023	Chandramukhi 2	Murugesan		
2025	Gangers	Singaram		
2025	Maareesan	Velayudham Pillai		
2026	Bang Bang	TBA	Filming	
2026	Pormuzhakkam	TBA	Pre-production	

== Discography ==
Year	Song	Film	Music director
1995	"Ettanaa Irundha"	Ellame En Rasathan	Ilaiyaraaja
1995	"Ammanikki Adangi"	Rajavin Parvaiyile	Ilayaraaja
1995	"Paalu Paalu Nepaalu"	Thaikulame Thaikulame	Deva
1996	"Vaadi Potta Pulla Veliye"	Kaalam Maari Pochu	Deva
1997	"Yaanai Yaanai"	Sakthi	R. Anand
1997	"Rayilu Rayilu"	Bharathi Kannamma	Deva
1997	"Luck Luck"	Thadayam	Deva
1997	"Poya Un Moonjila"	Ponnu Velayira Bhoomi	Deva
1998	"Ponnumani Ponnumani Poraale"	Poonthottam	Ilayaraaja
1999	"Alwa Kodukiraan"	Manaivikku Mariyadhai	Sirpy
1999	"Oothikadaa Machaan"	Nesam Pudhusu	Bobby
1999	"Chimini Chimini"	Pen Ondru Kanden	Kavi
2000	"Santhanamalligaiyil"	Rajakaali Amman	S. A. Rajkumar
2000	"Therkathi Maappillai"	Magalirkkaga	Indhiyan
2000	"Bumper Kulukkal"	Pirandha Naal	Deva
2001	"Madurakaara Vivek"	Looty	Deva
2001	"Naalu Adi Aaru"	En Purushan Kuzhandhai Maadhiri	S. A. Rajkumar
2001	"Alwa Kodukiran"	Vadagupatti Maapillai	Sirpy
2001	"Mathana Mathivathana"	Maayan	Deva
2002	"Vikkalu"	Bagavathi	Deva
2003	"Unnai Naan"	Kadhal Kirukkan	Deva
2004	"Kadhal Panna"	Kovil	Harris Jayaraj
2004	"Ooru Onu Onnu"	Aai	Srikanth Deva
2005	"Katunna Avalai Kattuvenda"	Jaisurya	Deva
2005	"Alavudin Alama"	Chanakya	Srikanth Deva
2005	"Vandhuta Vandhuta Vandhutaya"	Kundakka Mandakka	Bharadwaj
2005	"Freeyaavudu"	Aaru	Devi Sri Prasad
2007	"Aayiram Jannal Veedu"	Vel	Yuvan Shankar Raja
2008	"Vanthanam Vanthanam"	Indiralohathil Na Azhagappan	Sabesh–Murali
2008	"Mallika Sherawata"	Indiralohathil Na Azhagappan	Sabesh–Murali
2008	"Thaayaaramma"	Seval	G. V. Prakash Kumar
2009	"Vaada Mappiley"	Villu	Devi Sri Prasad
2014	"Rampappa"	Tenaliraman	D. Imman
2015	"Kannameya"	Eli	Vidhyasagar
2022	"Appatha"	Naai Sekar Returns	Santhosh Narayanan
2022	"Panakkaran"	Naai Sekar Returns	Santhosh Narayanan
2022	"Decent Aana Aalu"	Naai Sekar Returns	Santhosh Narayanan
2023	"Raasa Kannu"	Maamannan	A. R. Rahman
2025	"Ennada Polappu Idhu"	Madras Matinee	K. C. Balasarangan
2025	"Orey Oru"	Maareesan	Yuvan Shankar Raja
