= Kavundampalayam (film) =

2024 Indian Tamil-language film directed by Ranjith

- Theatrical release poster
- Directed by: Ranjith
- Written by: Ranjith
- Produced by: Subramaniam Palanisamy
- Starring: Ranjith; Alfia; Imman Annachi
- Production company: Shree Paasathai Movies
- Release date: 9 August 2024
- Running time: 131 minutes
- Country: India
- Language: Tamil
- Box office: ₹2.3 Million

Kavundampalayam is a 2024 Indian Tamil-language action drama film written and directed by Ranjith starring himself and Alfia. The film had its theatrical release on 9 August 2024 as a low-profile release due to being a relatively low budgeted film with lesser known cast members. The film revolves around the concept of fake dramatic romance which occurs often with the advent of a girl hailing from rich family background and high caste eloping with a boy hailing from poor low caste family background.

The film opened to mixed reviews from audience and critics, with criticism levelled mostly on outdated out-of-fashion screenplay, dialogues, music, overall acting of crew and poor storytelling and was also criticised for showcasing a biased ideology favoring towards one particular caste while degrading other castes and their rituals.

== Plot ==
The story follows Palanichamy, a respected upper-caste man whose daughter Mangani elopes with a lower-caste college student. A deeply disturbed Palanichamy attempts suicide but is saved, sparking a determined journey to find his daughter and save her from individuals he believes are manipulating young women.

== Cast ==
- Ranjith as Kuzhanthai
- Alfia
- Imman Annachi
- A. Palanisamy
- Thurai Makesh
- Kongu Manjunathan

== Controversies ==
The film faced major stumbling blocks and obstacles on its way before a critical court proceeding turned out to be a moral booster in the penultimate moment. The film was initially tentatively supposed to have its theatrical release on 5 June 2024, but it was postponed due to an impending FIR and court case against the release of the film. Madras High Court gave a verdict by alerting the police security to give special police permission and protection to release Kavundampalayam. Justice G. Jayachandran made the landmark judgement insisting the importance of providing security clearance to screen the film in across several theatres in Tamil Nadu, although the film had never developed a major hype among the audience due to less popular cast members being roped in for the production venture.

The film garnered severe backlash and condemnation from general public for portraying a storytelling with a contradicting biased narrative about relationships. Critics indicated that the film preaches about caste based vengeance which could negatively impact the society as the film focuses on self glorification of a particular caste group while humiliating other caste people creating factions and divisions among public in rural areas. Actor and filmmaker Ranjith himself who is well known for advocating about caste based vengeance, openly admitted that the film is about giving a tribute to parents of girls who sacrifice their lives to protect their daughters and blatantly opines against boys hailing from low caste background marrying girls from high caste rich family background. Ranjith's narrow minded sentiments and attitudes created a stir in social media with netizens describing about the double standards and hypocrisy of Ranjith, as he himself has engaged in a fake dramatic romance by dating actress Priya Raman during the film shooting of Nesam Pudhusu and the couple got married before getting separated due to personal reasons.

Critics indicated Ranjith may have thought of making a film based on caste just to get into politics and to intentionally create controversies in order to gain much needed publicity since he has largely been ignored by Kollywood industry, considering his character and backward minded personality. Ranjith in a press meet after the theatrical release of the film made a shocking remark about honor killing by justifying and supporting it as a vitally important aspect in society and Ranjith revealed it is not a violence related topic. He insisted that honor killing is done by parents of children as a way of showing their dissent towards fake dramatic romance and defended the honor killing approach terming it as a parents' way of showing their care towards children.
