= Pon Vilangu =

- Title card
- Directed by: K. S. Rajkumar
- Screenplay by: K. S. Rajkumar
- Story by: R. K. Selvamani
- Produced by: K. Rajarathinam
- Starring: Rahman; Ranjith; Ramya Krishnan; Sivaranjani
- Cinematography: M. Chandra Mouli
- Edited by: V. Uthayasankaran
- Music by: Ilaiyaraaja
- Production company: RK Productions
- Release date: 9 April 1993
- Running time: 135 minutes
- Country: India
- Language: Tamil

Pon Vilangu (transl. Golden Chain) is a 1993 Indian Tamil-language drama film directed by debutante director K. S. Rajkumar. The film stars Rahman, Ranjith, Ramya Krishnan and Sivaranjani. It was released on 10 April 1993.

== Plot ==
Muthu is a daily-wage worker whose whole world revolves around his young sister Mallika. Being a short-tempered man who cannot tolerate injustice, Muthu often gets involved in fights. Furthermore, he hates policemen. Raani, a private moneylender, is in love with Muthu and begins to seduce him in various ways.

Mallika falls in love with Raghu, an honest police inspector. Both become very close, spending time together until one day Muthu surprises them. The angry Muthu beats up his sister, and Raani intervenes in time to calm the enraged Muthu. Muthu tells them his tragic past.

In the past, his sister Mallika was just a baby and Muthu's parents were very poor. His jobless father looked for a job to feed the family. The only job that he found required a bicycle, so he purchased a bicycle from an unknown person for a low rate. The next day, the police caught his father and beat him for stealing the collector's bicycle. Knowing the news, his mother ran to the police station and she was raped to death by the drunk police officers. After seeing this atrocity, his father committed suicide in the police lock-up.

Since that traumatic event, Muthu starts to hate the police. Mallika understands her brother's feelings and asks him forgiveness, she then tries to forget Raghu. Thereafter, Raani begs Muthu to accept for Mallika's wedding with Raghu. Muthu finally accepts for the wedding but only under one condition : Raghu must resign his police job. Raghu, who also has a tragic past, refuses to resign. What transpires later forms the crux of the story.

== Cast ==
- Rahman as Raghu
- Ranjith as Muthu
- Ramya Krishnan as Raani
- Sivaranjani as Mallika
- Veera Pandiyan
- Loose Mohan
- Krishnamoorthy as Raghu's father
- Yuvasri as Raghu's mother
- Muthukumar
- Arulmani
- Bonda Mani as Maari
- Mahima
- Soundar
- Singamuthu

== Soundtrack ==
The music was composed by Ilaiyaraaja.

Track listing
| No. | Title | Lyrics | Singer(s) | Length |
|---|---|---|---|---|
| 1. | "Oru Kolakili" | Kamakodiyan | Jayachandran, Sunanda | 5:07 |
| 2. | "Sandhana Kumba" | Muthulingam | Mano, Uma Ramanan | 6:07 |
| 3. | "Koduthu Vacha" | Vaali | Malaysia Vasudevan, Sunanda | 5:05 |
| 4. | "Indha Pacha Kili" | Vaali | Jayachandran | 5:01 |
| 5. | "Ooty Malai" | Vaali | Malaysia Vasudevan, Sunanda | 5:05 |
| Total length: | | | | 26:25 |

== Reception ==
Malini Mannath of The Indian Express gave the film a positive review; she described the film as "an engrossing film centered on the strong bond between a brother and a sister" and praised the lead actors. K. Vijiyan of New Straits Times wrote that the film "keeps you entertained". R. P. R. of Kalki gave the film a negative review and was also critical of Ilaiyaraaja's music.
