= Thendral Varum Theru =

- VCD cover
- Directed by: N. G. Gowri Manohar
- Written by: Mu. Metha
- Produced by: B. Anandhi; S. Sikandar Batcha; G. M. Manimegalai; Mallika Metha; S. Amuthakumar
- Starring: Ramesh Aravind; Kasthuri
- Cinematography: Dinesh Baboo
- Edited by: P. R. Shanmugam
- Music by: Ilaiyaraaja
- Production company: Tamilmagal Creations
- Release date: 15 September 1994
- Country: India
- Language: Tamil

Thendral Varum Theru (transl. A Breezy Street) is a 1994 Indian Tamil-language romance film which is the directorial debut of N. G. Gowri Manohar and screenwriting debut of Mu. Metha. The film stars Ramesh Aravind and Kasthuri. It was released on 15 September 1994.

== Cast ==
- Ramesh Aravind
- Kasthuri
- Rizabawa
- Charuhasan
- Chinni Jayanth
- Charle
- Bonda Mani
- T. S. Raghavendra
- Omakuchi Narasimhan

== Production ==
Thendral Varum Theru is the directorial debut for N. G. Gowri Manohar, and Mu. Metha's first film as screenwriter.

== Soundtrack ==
Soundtrack was composed by Ilaiyaraaja and lyrics for all songs were written by Mu. Metha.

Song	Singers	Length
Amma Pillaiya	Mano, Uma Ramanan, Baby Prasanna	05:00
Meni Kodhikkuthadi	Mano	05:01
Pachaiyappa	Gangai Amaran, Pachaiyappa College Students	05:01
Pudhiya Paravai	Swarnalatha	04:59
Thendral Varum	Mano, Minmini	04:55
Unnai Pole	'Kovai' Soundararajan, Mano, K. S. Chithra	05:00

== Reception ==
Malini Mannath of The Indian Express praised Gowri Manohar's direction and Metha's writing, but said Ramesh Aravind was probably the only actor with a "consistent performance and characterisation". She felt Kasturi failed to do complete justice to her role and Rizabawa's role was not well defined.
