= Vasu Vikram =

Indian actor (born 1966)

- Born: M.R.R Vasu Vikram; 16 December 1966 (age 59); Tiruchirappalli, Madras State, (now Tamil Nadu), India
- Years active: 1988–present
- Children: 2
- Father: M. R. R. Vasu
- Relatives: Radha family

Vasu Vikram is an Indian actor who has worked on Tamil-language films and in television dramas.

== Career ==
Vasu Vikram is the son of actor M. R. R. Vasu, and the grandson of M. R. Radha. Several other members of his family are also in films, including his uncle Radha Ravi and aunts Radhika and Nirosha. He made his acting debut with Palaivanathil Pattampoochi (1988) and has continued to appear in supporting roles in films, appearing in villainous and comedy roles. Vasu Vikram has also appeared in Radhika's television serial, Chithi and won critical acclaim for his portrayal of a villainous character.

== Filmography ==
- Palaivanathil Pattampoochi (1988)
- Neengalum Herothan (1990)
- Kaliyuga Rudrulu (1990) (Telugu)
- Muthalali Amma (1990)
- Naan Pudicha Mappilai (1991)
- Vigneshwar (1991)
- Thaiyalkaran (1991)
- Bharathan (1992)
- Government Mappillai (1992)
- Idhu Namma Bhoomi (1992)
- Parvathi Ennai Paradi (1993)
- Thangakkili (1993)
- Oru Vasantha Geetham (1994)
- Ilaignar Ani (1994)
- Manju Virattu (1994)
- Sakthivel (1994)
- Sevatha Ponnu (1994)
- Sindhu Nathi Poo (1994)
- Pongalo Pongal (1997)
- Pistha (1997)
- Cheran Chozhan Pandian (1998)
- Maru Malarchi (1998)
- Sundara Pandian (1998)
- Ellame En Pondattithaan (1998)
- Pudhumai Pithan (1998)
- Padayappa (1999)
- Poomaname Vaa (1999)
- Paattali (1999)
- Kann Thirandhu Paaramma (2000)
- Samudhiram (2001)
- Dhaya (2002)
- Thamizhan (2002)
- Panchathantiram (2002)
- Baba (2002)
- Villain (2002)
- Gummalam (2002)
- Vaseegara (2003)
- Sena (2003)
- Bheeshmar (2003)
- Soori (2003)
- Indru (2003)
- Aethirree (2004)
- Kadhale Jayam (2004)
- Chatrapathy (2004)
- Dancer (2005)
- Padhavi Paduthum Paadu (2005)
- Inimey Nangathan (2007)
- Vasantham Vanthachu (2007)
- Sivaji (2007)
- Theekuchi (2008)
- Pattaya Kelappu (2008)
- Theeyavan (2008)
- Valluvan Vasuki (2008)
- Engal Aasan (2009)
- Thairiyam (2010)
- Azhagaana Ponnuthan (2010)
- Rasikkum Seemane (2010)
- Kola Kolaya Mundhirika (2010) as Kittu
- Nellu (2010)
- Markandeyan (2011)
- Venmani (2011)
- Masani (2013)
- Naan Rajavaga Pogiren (2013)
- Summa Nachunu Irukku (2013)
- Thalaivan (2014)
- Lingaa (2014)
- Nenjirukkumvarai Ninaivirukkum (2014)
- Kamara Kattu (2015)
- Buddhanin Sirippu (2015)
- Savaale Samaali (2015)
- Gethu (2016)
- Sangili Bungili Kadhava Thorae (2017)
- Vilayattu Aarambam (2017)
- Aarambamey Attakasam (2017)
- Oru Kanavu Pola (2017)
- Kadikara Manithargal (2018)
- Vanjagar Ulagam (2018)
- Vennila Kabaddi Kuzhu 2 (2019)
- Manguni Pandiyargal (2019)
- Sandimuni (2020)
- Routtu (2020)
- Bestie (2022)
- Moondram Pournami (2023)
- Va Varalam Va (2023)
- Vasco Da Gama (2024)

== Television ==
Year	Title	Role	Channel
2000–2001	Chithi	Velumani / Mani	Sun TV
2002–2004	Indhira		Sun TV
2002	Avargal		Sun TV
2004–2005	Chinna Papa Periya Papa	Pazhani	Sun TV
2004–2006	Manaivi	Velu	Sun TV
2005–2006	Dheerga Sumangali		Vaanavil TV
2005–2006	Selvi	Sathya	Sun TV
2005–2006	Alli Rajiyam	Half Body Aarumugam	Sun TV
2007; 2009	Arasi	Sathya	Sun TV
2007–2008	Sooryavamsam		Sun TV
2007–2008	Porandha Veeda Puguntha Veeda		Sun TV
2008–2010	Thirupaavai		Sun TV
2008–2010	Sendhoorapoove		Sun TV
2009; 2012–2013	Chellamay	Karuppu	Sun TV
2010–2012	No 23 Mahalakshmi Nivasam		Gemini TV
2012	Merku Mambalathil Oru Kaadhal		Zee Tamil
2013	Vani Rani	Moorthy	Sun TV
2013–2014	Nalla Neram		Zee Tamil
2014	Mudivalla Arambam		Vendhar TV
2017–2019	Azhagu	Manimaran	Sun TV
2018	Saravanan Meenatchi (season 3)		Star Vijay
2019–2020	Tamil Selvi	Shakthivel	Sun TV
2020	Bharathi Kannamma	Mahalingam	Star Vijay
2020	Magarasi	Vishwanathan	Sun TV
2020–2022	Velaikaran	Singaperumal	Star Vijay
2020–2021	Abhiyum Naanum	Veluchaami	Sun TV
2021	Thendral Vanthu Ennai Thodum	Chidhambaram	Star Vijay
2021–2022	Roja	Jayaseelan	Sun TV
2021–2022	Enga Veetu Meenakshi	Dharmarajan	Colors Tamil
2022–2023	Sandakozhi	Poonai Kannan	Zee Tamil
2025	Sindhu Bairavi Kacheri Arambam	Rajakili	Star Vijay
2026	Lakshmi & Iru Malargal	Aghora Kaalagandan	Sun TV
