= Aadhikkam =

- Directed by: V. C. Guhanathan
- Written by: V. C. Guhanathan
- Produced by: Nallai Ananthan
- Starring: Ranjith; Vignesh; Monal
- Cinematography: Dharma
- Edited by: N. R. Babu
- Music by: Chandrabose
- Production company: Sri SRN Productions
- Release date: 25 February 2005
- Running time: 120 minutes
- Country: India
- Language: Tamil

Aadhikkam (transl. Dominance) is a 2005 Indian Tamil-language thriller film directed by V. C. Guhanathan. The film stars Ranjith, Vignesh and Monal, with Satya Prakash, Chandra Lakshman, newcomer Aruna Giridhar and Indhu playing supporting roles. The low-budget film, produced by Nallai Ananthan, was released in 2005 after many delays. This was the official last film of Monal who died back in 2002, 3 years before the release.

== Plot ==
Naaga (Ranjith) was a rowdy who secretly worked for Sub-Inspector Pandian (Satya Prakash) and helped the police solve cases. One day, the news reporter Lakshmi revealed Pandian's partnership with a rowdy to the media. The issue quickly mushroomed and made the front page. The scandal tarnished Pandian's reputation, and the promotion that he was waiting for so long was cancelled by his superiors. Naaga then kidnapped Lakshmi, and Pandian brutally raped her. Pandian ordered Naaga to kill her, but Naaga changed his mind and let her go.

Many years later, Lakshmi, who suffers from mental illness, is the mother of the little girl Devi (Baby Akshaya) born due to the rape. Guru is a TV serial and commercial actor who wants to become a cinema hero. One day, he finds his friend Julie dead in her home. The police arrested him for killing her. Jhansi, who loves Guru since her childhood, decides to get him out of prison and conducts an investigation alone. Desiring to know her father, Devi leaves her mother and grandfather in search of her father.

Naaga changed his name to Durai, saw the error of his ways, and repented. Naaga later takes Devi, lost in the city, and Jhansi, pursued by criminals, to his house. Thereafter, Naaga learns that Pandian, now promoted as Assistant Commissioner of Police, is the father of Devi and is behind Guru's arrest. What transpires later forms the crux of the story.

== Cast ==
- Ranjith as Naaga / Durai
- Vignesh as Guru
- Monal as Jhansi
- Satya Prakash as Sub-Inspector Pandian
- Chandra Lakshman as Priya
- Aruna Giridhar as Julie
- Indhu as Lakshmi
- Baby Akshaya as Devi
- K. Rajan as Jhansi's father
- Arulmani as Priya's father
- K. Natraj as Lakshmi's father
- Besant Ravi as Simha Naidu
- Kadhal Sukumar as Govindhan
- Bonda Mani as Bonda
- Swaminathan
- Usha Priya as Parvathy
- Kottachi
- Scissor Manohar
- Gemini Sridhar

== Soundtrack ==
The film score and the soundtrack were composed by Chandrabose, with lyrics written by Vairamuthu and Mu. Metha.

No.	Title	Singer(s)	Length
1.	"16 Vayasula"	Shankar Mahadevan	03:35
2.	"Southla Saidapet"	Deva	04:28
3.	"Ennoda Paattu"	Anuradha Sriram	03:28
4.	"Black Ticket"	Sabesh	04:52
Total length:			16:23

== Reception ==
Chennai Online wrote "It's a hop, skip and jump style of narration and scripting. Hopping unsteadily without any focus. Skipping over continuity factors."
