= Munnar (film) =

- Directed by: K. Thambi Durai
- Written by: K. Thambi Durai
- Starring: Ranjith; Prem; K. Thambi Durai; Ragasya; Reethima
- Cinematography: C. Marimuthu
- Edited by: L. Kesavan
- Music by: Devendran
- Production company: Thennaga Thirai Koodam
- Release date: 2 October 2009
- Running time: 115 minutes
- Country: India
- Language: Tamil

Munnar is a 2009 Indian Tamil-language thriller film directed by K. Thambi Durai. The film stars Ranjith, Prem and K. Thambi Durai. It was released on 2 October 2009.

== Plot ==
Vaithyaraman is looking for his brother Chandramouli who went missing during his honeymoon. Chandramouli 's wife Sandhya is admitted into a mental hospital. A CBI officer Karthikeyan is assigned to find Chandramouli .

== Cast ==
- Ranjith as Karthikeyan
- Prem as Shankar
- K. Thambi Durai as Chandra Mouli
- Ragasya as Vandana
- Reethima as Sandhya
- K. R. Vijaya as a judge
- Vadivukkarasi as Sandhya's mother
- R. Sundarrajan as Vaithyaraman
- Master Karthik
- Vaiyapuri as Kanagavel
- O. A. K. Sundar as Kathirvel
- Mahanadi Shankar as Inspector Rajakumaran
- Thideer Kannaiah
- Kovai Senthil

== Production ==
K. Thambi Durai, a former assistant director to Seventh Channel's Manickam Narayanan, announced the film with Riyaz Khan to play the second hero in the film. The camera work is by C. Marimuthu who has done 24 Malayalam films, and also the British film In The Name Of God and the Tamil film Kannamma (2005). Reddy master does the choreography while L. Kesavan is the editor. The film launch was attended by KRG, Manickam Narayanan, Kaja Mydeen, Ibrahim Rowther, Abirami Ramanathan, Kalipuli G.Sekar and Riyaz Khan among others. Riyaz Khan revealed that he is playing the second hero in the film. "The film is a thriller and my character in the film is attracted by the fragrance of the heroine in the car she has sat in and left just before I enter. I don’t see her but only feel her presence through the fragrance. It’s a heroine oriented subject," he revealed. Riyaz Khan was later replaced by Ranjith. The scenes were shot mainly in Munnar, Kodaikanal, Ooty and Thekkady.

== Soundtrack ==
The music was composed by Devendran.

Song	Singer(s)	Duration
"Konjam Poo Konjam Thaen" (Duet)	Chinmayi, Karthik	4:26
"Konjam Poo Konjam Thaen" (Solo)	Chinmayi	4:26
"Minminikku Thangachi Naan"	Reshmi	4:44
"Pulikkuma Thuvarkuma"	Mano, Hema Nandu	3:29
"Sri Ranga Sri Ranga"	S. P. Balasubrahmanyam	4:23

== Critical reception ==
Malathi Rangarajan of The Hindu wrote, "Discrepancies are aplenty and so are gaffes. Moonar (U/A) tries to stand on the strength of a true murder story — it could have, if it had been aided by racy narration. But instead of a bolstering screenplay, you have one that goes limp midway".
