= Sundari Neeyum Sundaran Naanum =

- Directed by: A. N. Rajagopal
- Written by: A. N. Rajagopal
- Produced by: V. Thiyagarajan
- Starring: Pandiarajan; Easwari Rao
- Cinematography: K. Nithya
- Edited by: R. T. Annadurai
- Music by: Deva
- Production company: Gurumeena Films
- Release date: 21 November 1999
- Running time: 140 minutes
- Country: India
- Language: Tamil

Sundari Neeyum Sundaran Naanum is a 1999 Indian Tamil-language comedy film directed by A. N. Rajagopal. The film stars Pandiarajan and Easwari Rao, with Ranjith, Manorama, Senthil, Charle, Anu Mohan, Pandu, Sathyapriya, Anuja, Anitha and Vaiyapuri playing supporting roles. It was released on 21 November 1999.

== Plot ==
Subramani is an owner of a small video rental store and a wedding cameraman, and he lives with his widowed mother. Each time Subramani does something good, he ends up getting in trouble for it.

The henpecked Panneerselvam and the arrogant Mangamma have three daughters: Anuja, who is married to a jobless man; the childish Hamsaveni; and Krishnaveni. Mangamma only likes Krishnaveni and relies heavily on her. Panneerselvam asks Subramani to romance Krishnaveni. Subramani agrees and tries to seduce her. She then falls in love with him. When Mangamma learns of their love affair, she sends henchmen to beat him up, but Subramani easily beats all of them. Mangamma has no option but to lock Krishnaveni in her room, and she hires a private teacher for a daughter. Subramani's friend Perumal enters their home as a teacher, and he falls in love with Hamsaveni. Panneerselvam is Subramani's maternal uncle, and he explains to Subramani that he wants him to marry his daughter to reconcile with his sister: Subramani's mother.

In the past, after the death of Subramani's father, Panneerselvam brought his sister and his nephew Subramani at home. Mangamma wanted to throw them out of their home, so she tried to poison Subramani. Panneerselvam saved him, Subramani's mother and Subramani left the house on the post.

In the meantime, fraud Sivaramakrishnan is blackmailing Panneerselvam who had a secret affair with his sister. Sivaramakrishnan then enters in Panneerselvam's home as a rich man and he tries to impress Mangamma to marry her daughter Krishnaveni. But Subramani and Panneerselvam try many tricks to wreck Sivaramakrishnan's malicious plan. What transpires next forms the rest of the story.

== Cast ==
- Pandiarajan as Subramaniyan
- Eswari Rao as Krishnaveni
- Ranjith as Sivaramakrishnan
- Manorama as Subramaniyan's mother
- Senthil as Anuja's husband
- Charle as Perumal
- Anu Mohan as Panneerselvam
- Pandu as Chinnasamy
- Sathyapriya as Mangamma
- Anuja as Anuja
- Anitha as Amsaveni
- Vaiyapuri
- Chaplin Balu
- K. R. Vatsala as Manimegalai
- Mohanapriya
- Idichapuli Selvaraj
- Vellai Subbaiah as Astrologer
- T. K. S. Natarajan
- Suryakanth
- MLA Thangaraj
- Rathnakumar
- Chelladurai as Police constable
- Chitra Lakshmanan as Ramalingam (guest appearance)

== Soundtrack ==
The soundtrack was composed by Deva.

Song	Singer(s)	Lyrics	Duration
"Annaiyum Pithavum"	Deva	Ra. Ravishankar	4:36
"Thakali Jusa"	Krishnaraj	Kamakodiyan	5:13
"Manipura Manipura"	Anuradha Sriram, Srinivas	Kamakodiyan	4:27
"Unaal Thokkam Illai"	Krishnaraj, Harini	Kalaikumar	5:30
"Baagunnara"	S. P. B. Charan, Yugendran	Kalaikumar	4:36

== Reception ==
Sify said, "The film is watchable only for those who want to watch Easwari's oomph but otherwise a waste of time". Chennai Online criticised the film's comedy as "crude, juvenile and jarring", adding, "It is no doubt a debutant director’s work, but then shouldn’t he have been more careful in planning his screenplay?".
