= Chatrapathy (2004 film) =

- Poster
- Directed by: Srimahesh
- Produced by: Babu Raja
- Starring: R. Sarathkumar; Nikita Thukral
- Cinematography: Karthik Raja
- Edited by: V. Jaishankar
- Music by: S. A. Rajkumar
- Production company: JJ Films
- Release date: 11 November 2004
- Country: India
- Language: Tamil

Chatrapathy is a 2004 Indian Tamil language action film directed by Srimahesh in his debut. The film stars R. Sarathkumar and Nikita Thukral whilst Vadivelu, Mahadevan, and Adithya Menon play supporting roles. The film was released on 11 November 2004.

== Plot ==
Saravanan is a bus driver and Kili is the bus cleaner in a college. He also takes care of an orphanage which is home to many children and old-aged people. Indhu, a student of the college, tries to woo Saravanan. Meanwhile, a few rowdies are found dead. Those rowdies happened to be henchmen of Chakravarthy, a local powerful politician. It is revealed that Saravanan is the man behind the murders.

A flashback is shown where Saravanan's actual name is Chatrapathy. He is an army major and recipient of Param Vir Chakra, the highest military decoration in India. On his visit to his native village in Tamil Nadu, Chatrapathy finds that Chakravarthy has grabbed majority of the land in his village from poor farmers with plans of constructing a beer factory. Chakravarthy also troubles Chatrapathy's widowed sister by forcing her to hand over her land where she runs a small orphanage. As Chatrapathy opposes this, Chakravarthy and his henchmen beat up Chatrapathy and his sister cheating, following which she dies. They also demolish the orphanage, which leads to the deaths of a few children. They also finally grab the land. An angered Chatrapathy kills Chakravarthy's henchmen and goes into hiding to escape from police, waiting for an opportunity to kill Chakravarthy.

Chakravarthy finds out that Chatrapathy is behind him for taking revenge and tries to protect himself. However Chatrapathy kills Chakravarthy cheating in the end and surrenders to the police. The court hands over Chatrapathy to the army.

== Cast ==
- R. Sarathkumar as Major Chatrapathy alias Saravanan
- Nikita Thukral as Indhu
- Vadivelu as Kili
- Mahadevan as Chakravarthy Pandian
- Adithya Menon as Siva
- Saranya Ponvannan as Saravanan's sister
- Pooja Lokesh as Chakravarthy's deputy
- Rajesh
- Ilavarasu as Deputy Commissioner
- Besant Ravi
- Mahanadi Shankar
- Sabitha Anand
- Jasper
- Madhan Bob
- Halwa Vasu
- Bava Lakshmanan as Police constable
- Pyramid Natarajan
- Vasu Vikram
- Singamuthu
- Bonda Mani
- Ravichandran as Judge
- Rambha in a special appearance

== Production ==
The film is the directorial debut of Srimahesh. It was shot in various locations including Chennai, Pondicherry, Tuticorin, New Delhi, Kumbakonam, Bangkok, Kulu Manali and Bangalore. This was the debut film of Anal Arasu as stunt choreographer.

== Soundtrack ==
The music was composed by S. A. Rajkumar and released on Star Music.

Track listing
No.	Title	Lyrics	Singer(s)	Length
1.	"Kaadhal Theviravathi"	Arivumathi	Mathangi Jagdish, Srinivas	4:39
2.	"Naanga Ninna"	Vaali	Pop Shalini, Palakkad Sreeram, Kalpana	4:30
3.	"Nee Ragasiyamaga"	Pa. Vijay	Vasundhara Das, Karthik	4:34
4.	"Ore Oru Raathirikku"	Na. Muthukumar	Malathy Lakshman	4:42
5.	"Vettripathi Veerapathi"	S. A. Rajkumar	Nellai Muthuperumal, S.A. Rajkumar	3:34
Total length:				21:59

== Critical reception ==
S. R. Ashok Kumar of The Hindu wrote, "The film has love, sentiment, and heroism as the title suggests. The dialogue is crisp and director Srimahesh who makes his debut is also in charge of story, screenplay and dialogue. He should have worked a little more, mainly in the second half". Visual Dasan of Kalki praised the acting of Sarathkumar and Nikitha and Rajkumar's music and also appreciated the director portraying Sarathkumar's transformation and flashback. Sify wrote, "Chatrapathy is an escapist film meant only for those who enjoy mass masala films devoid of any logic or reason". G. Ulaganathan of Deccan Herald wrote, "To some extent the director is able to maintain the suspense over the identity of Sarath Kumar till the interval. But once it is revealed, the film goes on predictable lines".
