= Bheeshmar =

- DVD cover
- Directed by: Ranjith
- Written by: Ranjith
- Produced by: Priya Raman
- Starring: Ranjith; Devayani
- Cinematography: S. D. Kannan
- Edited by: Suresh Urs
- Music by: S. P. Venkatesh
- Production company: Maverick Entertainment
- Release date: 27 September 2003
- Running time: 150 minutes
- Country: India
- Language: Tamil

Bheeshmar is a 2003 Indian Tamil-language action drama film directed by actor Ranjith, making his directorial debut. The film stars Ranjith himself as the titular character with Devayani, Rami Reddy, Riyaz Khan, Anu Mohan, Ilavarasu, Vasu Vikram, Sadiq and Baby Prahasitha playing supporting roles. The film, produced by Ranjith's wife Priya Raman, had music by S. P. Venkatesh and was released on 27 September 2003.

== Plot ==
Bheeshmar (Ranjith) is an honest and upright police officer. He is married to Gowri (Devayani), and they have a six-year-old girl named Pappathi (Baby Prahasitha). Bheeshmar is transferred to a new department which is filled with corrupt police officers. Soon, Bheeshmar clashes with policemen Aadhi (Ilavarasu) and Dhandapani (Vasu Vikram), Assistant Commissioner Singampuli (Sadiq), and the heartless politician R. K. (Rami Reddy). Later, Bheeshmar was suspended for beating up Singampuli in court. Afterward, the police arrested Bheeshmar for a crime he did not commit, and he was put in jail. Gowri sells her kidney for the advocate's expenses to release him. After that, Bheeshmar ends up fighting with rowdies while bringing the medicine for his wife. He is not able to make it at the right time, so his wife dies in the hospital. The unemployed Bheeshmar turns berserk and kills all of his enemies. He is again arrested and is brought by a police van. In the traffic signal, he sees his daughter begging for food. She tries to run towards his van, and meanwhile, an accident happens to her. Bheeshmar wakes up screaming with his daughter nearby; he realizes that it is a nightmare. At that point, he understands that the evil in society is way more powerful than him. He then burns his police uniform and decides to start a new life with Pappathi.

== Cast ==
- Ranjith as Inspector Bheeshmar
- Devayani as Gowri, Bheeshmar's wife
- Rami Reddy as R. K.
- Riyaz Khan as Doctor Sakthi
- Anu Mohan as Constable Munu Munisaamy
- Ilavarasu as Aadhi
- Vasu Vikram as Dhandapani
- Sooriya as Lawyer
- Sadiq as Assistant Commissioner Singampuli
- Baby Prahasitha as Pappathi
- Sabash Y. S. D. Sehar
- Chelladurai as School Principal
- Citizen Mani as Beggar
- Kottai Perumal
- Thirupur Ramasamy

== Soundtrack ==
The soundtrack, composed by S. P. Venkatesh, features a single track "Nadagam Pol Vaazhkaiyila", sunby by Unni Menon and written by Snehan.

== Critical reception ==
Malathi Rangarajan of The Hindu said, "In the area of dialogue, [Ranjith] scores. As a hero he fills the bill. It is in the other departments that he is found wanting". Sify wrote, "Ranjith has perpetuated so many stereotypes in this flick [...] The fatal flaw in the film is the screenplay, which is screeching and at times tries to be a third rate tearjerker" and said, "the censors have butchered the film and in most of the scenes dialogue cuts make the film jarring". Visual Dasan of Kalki praised Ranjith for making a realistic police film instead of masala one and concluded saying in the midst of larger than life cop roles who speaks punch dialogues, Bheeshmar is an honourable police.
