= Bonda Mani =

Indian actor (1963–2023)

- Born: Kedheeswaran; 19 September 1963; Mannar District, Ceylon
- Died: 23 December 2023 (aged 60); Polichalur, Tamil Nadu, India
- Occupation: Actor
- Years active: 1991–2023
- Spouse: Madhavi
- Children: 2

Kedheeswaran, better known as Bonda Mani (19 September 1963 – 23 December 2023), was an Indian actor who appeared in Tamil language films. He came to Tamil Nadu from Sri Lanka as a refugee.

He predominantly worked in comedy and supporting roles in over 270 films in his illustrious career spanning three decades. He was well known for his performances in Pongalo Pongal (1997), Sundhara Travels (2002), Winner (2003), Englishkaran (2005), Aaru (2005) and Marudhamalai (2007) and Kannum Kannum (2008). He was known for his one-line dialogues in films in which he acted.

== Early life and career ==
Kedheeswaran was born on 19 September 1963 in Mannar District, Sri Lanka, where he was also raised. He was born as the fifteenth child in his family and had fifteen siblings in his family.

He lost both his parents at an early age, as both became victims of the Sri Lankan civil war. His mother and eight of his siblings attempted to flee Sri Lanka in 1983 by boat, but died when their boat was capsized due to a bomb deployed by the Sri Lankan Army during the peak of the Sri Lankan civil war.

He moved to India after spending his early childhood in Sri Lanka. He grew up as a die-hard fan of M. G. Ramachandran.

In an exclusive interview with Kumudam, he revealed that he had been cheated by his agent, who promised him that he would make arrangements to get him a job in Tamil Nadu, but allegedly made Bonda Mani sign an agreement that required him to stay in Singapore for five years. However, he received a timely opportunity to meet K. Bhagyaraj, whom he asked for a film role, which Bhagyaraj refused. Mani also asked for Bhagyaraj's address, which Bhagyaraj initially refused to give. Bhagyaraj asked Mani to meet him in Chennai and clarify the situation accordingly.

He then decided to join those other Tamils in moving to Tamil Nadu to seek asylum, and in his case to pursue film roles, in 1983. He then resided in a refugee camp in Chidambaram and worked under Udaiyar Ramachandran in Chennai.

Mani apparently tried to enter the Tamil film industry for seven years, but his attempts failed to bear fruit. Mani then came back to Sri Lanka in 1990 and launched a grocery shop, naming it "Latha Stores", but suffered an injury due to a bomb attack that left one of his legs nearly paralyzed. He left Sri Lanka again that same year, once again joining a refugee camp in Salem.

== Career ==
While working in Singapore during the 1980s, he had become acquainted with director K. Bhagyaraj, who visited the country for a show. He later reconnected with Bhagyaraj during a visit to Chennai and was cast in a supporting role in Pavunnu Pavunuthan (1991). He came to Tamil Nadu mainly with the intention of entering the film industry, as he had dreamed of an acting career since his childhood, and he also made the decision to enter Kollywood due to the lack of Tamil films being produced in Sri Lanka.

Mani subsequently made a breakthrough after his performance in Thendral Varum Theru (1994) and the film received positive reviews. He eventually made his television debut in Raj TV television soap opera Ganga Yamuna Saraswati (1998), where he starred alongside veterans including M. S. Viswanathan.

He appeared with veteran Tamil actor Vadivelu in many of his memorable comedy tracks. He was persuaded by director Suraj and actor Arjun to portray the role of a beggar in Marudhamalai over a call even though his mentor Vadivelu told him not to act in such role, explaining the dire consequences of acting in such kind of roles. He had maintained good companionship with both Vadivelu and Vivek, and he also gave credit to both Vadivelu and Vivek for helping him grow in his career.

His comedy dialogues in films came mostly when he collaborated alongside Vadivelu, including "annan ethayum sollidathinga adichu kooda kepanga sollidathinga" (transl. Brother, don't say anything even if they beat you up) in Kannum Kannum, and dialogues in films like Englishkaran, Aaru, and Marudhamalai. He also occasionally collaborated with Vivek in films including Thirumalai (2003) and Padikkadavan (2009). Vivek also advised Bonda Mani that he would get more recognition and fame when he collaborated with Vadivelu.

Bonda Mani also credited G. Marimuthu with the dialogue in the film Kannum Kannum (2008), which made Bonda Mani an household name among the general audience at the time of the film's theatrical release. The dialogue became a popular internet meme template and was widely used in social media platforms.

Along with commitments as an actor, Bonda Mani ran a stage drama troupe called "Sai Kalai Koodam" and organised theatrical shows. He made a comeback return to television with a fully-fledged role in Enga Veetu Meenakshi (2021), where he played the role of a snake charmer.

== Personal life ==
In June 2016, Bonda Mani joined the All India Anna Dravida Munnetra Kazhagam political party along with a few Dravida Munnetra Kazhagam party workers. Bonda Mani personally met the Chief Minister Jayalalithaa to officially join the party. In 2020, he received a Sri Lankan passport but he insisted to the Sri Lankan authorities that he desired to travel abroad to engage in comedy shows. However, he did not receive Indian citizenship and remained as a refugee in India until his death, and he could not travel abroad as a result of not gaining Indian citizenship.

=== Illness and death ===
Mani faced severe health issues as his health deteriorated around 2022 and he confronted diabetes. He fainted when travelling in a bus in September 2022; he was immediately admitted to Omandurar Rajiv Gandhi Hospital for medical treatment and was assisted by fellow comedian King Kong. Bonda Mani was depressed to know that the bill amount was unaffordable for him during that time especially with lack of film opportunities. It was also reported that both his kidneys were starting to malfunction.

Film producer Ishari K. Ganesh reportedly told Bonda Mani to undergo operations and dialysis and also told him to not worry about the medical expenses. He also received financial support from prominent actors including Vijay Sethupathi, Rajnikanth, Dhanush and Samuthirakani.

Mani died due to kidney failure in Polichalur, Chennai, on 23 December 2023, at the age of 60. He had been admitted to the intensive care unit at a government hospital at Omandurar. His funeral was held in Chromepet on 24 December 2023.

== Filmography ==
Year	Title	Role	Note
1991	Pavunnu Pavunuthan		Uncredited
1993	Manikuyil		
1993	Pon Vilangu	Maari	
1994	Thendral Varum Theru		
1994	Nila		
1994	Ravanan		
1995	Naan Petha Magane		
1995	Paattu Padava		
1995	Muthu	Villager	Uncredited
1995	Murai Mappillai		
1996	Aruva Velu		
1996	Vaazhga Jananayagam		
1996	Avathara Purushan		
1996	Kaalam Maari Pochu	Sekar's coworker	
1996	Minor Mappillai	Ramu and Moses's friend	
1996	Selva	Colony man	
1997	Nattupura Nayagan		
1997	Bharathi Kannamma		
1997	Arunachalam		
1997	Pongalo Pongal	Pannaiyar's servant	
1998	Vettu Onnu Thundu Rendu		
1998	Ponmaanai Thedi		
1999	Suyamvaram	Hosteller	
1999	Nesam Pudhusu		
2000	Thirunelveli		
2000	Koodi Vazhnthal Kodi Nanmai	Boxer Krishnan's assistant	
2001	Rishi	Car washer	
2001	Ninaikkatha Naalillai	Townmani's henchman	
2001	En Purushan Kuzhandhai Maadhiri	Villager	
2001	Sri Raja Rajeshwari		
2002	Pammal K. Sambandam	Hospital warden	
2002	Vivaramana Aalu	Mentally ill man	
2002	Thenkasi Pattanam		
2002	Karmegham		
2002	Naina	Mani	
2002	Run	Biriyani shop owner	
2002	Sundara Travels	Groom	
2002	Maaran		
2003	Vaseegara	Auto driver	Uncredited
2003	Anbu	Customer	
2003	Winner	Kaipulla's sidekick	
2003	Thirumalai	Fake Astrologer	
2003	Ottran		
2003	Kadhal Kirukkan	Shop owner	
2004	Maanasthan		
2004	Madhurey	Waiter	
2004	M. Kumaran Son of Mahalakshmi	Assistant priest	
2004	Chatrapathy		
2004	Sollattuma		
2004	Jaisurya		
2004	Meesai Madhavan	Circus Worker	
2004	Remote		
2004	Aai	Auto driver	
2005	Ayya	Mani	
2005	Aayudham		
2005	Mannin Maindhan		
2005	6'2		
2005	Englishkaran	Thirumugam's friend	
2005	Kaatrullavarai	Watchman	
2005	February 14	Canteen employee	
2005	Chanakya	Subramani's customer	
2005	Mazhai	Petrol Bunk Employee	
2005	Aaru	Mani	
2005	Vetrivel Sakthivel	Seller	
2005	Kundakka Mandakka	Auto dealer	
2006	Pachchak Kuthira	Bonda	
2006	Aadhikkam	Bonda	
2006	Kurukshetram	Owner of "Hotel Doobakoor" restaurant	
2006	Vathiyar	Muniyandi's sidekick	
2006	Chennai Kadhal	Rowdy Rangan	Uncredited
2007	Thaamirabharani	Saattai Shankar	
2007	Manikanda		
2007	Thottal Poo Malarum	Kabali Khan's gang member	
2007	Urchagam		
2007	Marudhamalai	Beggar	
2007	Piragu		
2008	Sandai	Mani's troupe member	
2008	Muniyandi Vilangial Moonramandu		
2008	Kuselan	Shanmugam's sidekick	
2008	Nadigai	Mumtaj's manager	Uncredited
2009	Padikkadavan	Bonda Mani	
2009	Rajadhi Raja		
2009	Azhagar Malai		
2010	Vaadaa	Annamalai travels worker	
2010	Aarvam	Mani	
2011	Velayudham	Beggar	
2011	Osthe		
2012	Medhai		
2012	Mattuthavani	Tea seller	
2012	Akilan		
2013	Mayil Paarai		
2013	Masani		
2014	Adhu Vera Idhu Vera		
2014	Sokku Sundaram		
2014	Kalkandu		
2014	Nenjirukkumvarai Ninaivirukkum		
2015	Vethu Vettu	Attachi Appakadai customer	
2015	Maharani Kottai		
2015	Athiradi		
2015	Kathirvel Kaakha		
2015	Aluchattiyam Appadi Irikum		
2016	Vaaliba Raja		
2016	Bathiladi		
2016	Sandikuthirai		
2016	Ilamai Oonjal	Actor	
2016	Andaman		
2017	Muthuramalingam	Ghost	
2017	Karanam		
2018	Nari Vettai		
2018	Solli Vidava	Madhu's friend	
2019	Thanimai		
2019	Manguni Pandiyargal		
2021	Sariya Thavara		
2021	Chinna Pannai Periya Pannai		
2022	Uzhaikkum Kaigal		
2022	Paruva Kadhal		
2023	Striker		
2023	Va Varalam Va		
2023	Sri Sabari Ayyappan		
2024	Kolai Thooram		Posthumous releases
2025	Otha Votu Muthaiya	Farmer	Posthumous releases
2025	Magabali		Posthumous releases

== Television ==
- Ganga Yamuna Saraswati (1998)
- Poove Poochudava (2020) – Special appearance
- Enga Veetu Meenakshi (2022) as Snake Charmer
