= Padhavi Paduthum Paadu =

2005 film by C. Ramalingam

- Directed by: C. Ramalingam
- Written by: Thuglak Sathya (dialogues)
- Screenplay by: C. Ramalingam
- Story by: Thuglak Sathya
- Produced by: G. Moorthy
- Starring: Ranjith; Anamika
- Cinematography: P. S. Selvam
- Edited by: Mohan; Subbu
- Music by: Gandhidasan
- Production company: GM Movies
- Release date: 3 June 2005
- Running time: 135 minutes
- Country: India
- Language: Tamil

Padhavi Paduthum Paadu (transl. Strains caused by the position) is a 2005 Tamil language political satire film directed by C. Ramalingam. The film stars Ranjith and Anamika, with Ravichandran, Pyramid Natarajan, Manivannan, Vasu Vikram, Rajesh, Raj Kapoor, T. P. Gajendran, Alex and Pandu playing supporting roles. The film was produced by G. Moorthy, its musical score, by Gandhidasan and it was released on 3 June 2005.

== Plot ==
Malayappan (Ranjith) is a notorious brigand, living in the forest, who kidnaps the former Chief Minister Tamizharasan (Ravichandran) and demands a huge ransom to the government. The current Chief Minister Veerabhadran (Pyramid Natarajan) in any case is glad that his arch-political rival and leader of the opposition has been kidnapped by Malayappan. Veerabhadran declares to the media that he will not negotiate with Malayappan and he will not give a single penny to the brigand. Malayappan realizes that he made a mistake by kidnapping the wrong person. Therefore, the cunning Tamizharasan suggests that Malayappan kidnap Veerabhadran's daughter and Malayappan follows his advice. Veerabhadran, who now wants to save his daughter at any cost, sends the popular news reporter Muthuvel (Vasu Vikram) to negotiate with the brigand in the forest. Thereafter, Malayappan releases Veerabhadran's daughter and a video of him killing Tamizharasan.

Following the fiasco, the governor of Tamil Nadu dismissed the current state government and Veerabhadran lost his Chief Minister post. Malayappan even gets a general amnesty and receives a government bungalow. Tamizharasan is indeed alive and that video of him being killed was a sham. Malayappan, who was hiding in the forests so far, is hailed by the people of Tamil Nadu. Thus Malayappan forms a political party after seeing his growing popularity. According to the survey, Malayappan has a good probability to become the new Chief Minister. Veerabhadran and Tamizharasan's party members then join Malayappan's party. In the end, the brigand cum politician Malayappan wins the election by a huge margin and becomes the new Chief Minister. In the meantime, Malayappan marries his lover Ponni (Anamika). Unlike the former Chief Ministers, Malayappan wants to help the people and starts his fight against corruption. What transpires next forms the crux of the story.

== Cast ==
- Ranjith as Malayappan
- Anamika as Ponni
- Ravichandran as Tamizharasan
- Pyramid Natarajan as Veerabhadran
- Manivannan as Marudhanayagam
- Vasu Vikram as Muthuvel
- Rajesh as Manivasagam
- Raj Kapoor as Raja
- T. P. Gajendran
- Alex
- Pandu
- Auditor Sridhar as Seetharaman
- Nellai Siva
- Sempuli Jagan as Sengali
- Chelladurai as Swamy
- Tirupur Ramasamy
- Nambirajan
- Abhinayashree

== Production ==
C. Ramalingam, a one-time associate of director K. Bhagyaraj, made his directorial debut with Padhavi Paduthum Paadu. He said, "though it is about Veerappan, it's no serious stuff. It's a political spoof certain to draw humour in the theatre". The film was shot in Chennai, Tiruvannamalai, Sathyamangalam, Mettur and Anthiyur forest areas where the brigand Veerappan lived. The film was based on series which was serialised in magazine Thuglak.

== Soundtrack ==
Padhavi Paduthum Paadu

Soundtrack album by Gandhidasan
- Released: 2005
- Recorded: 2005
- Genre: Feature film soundtrack
- Length: 10:35
- Producer: Gandhidasan

The film score and the soundtrack were composed by Gandhidasan. The soundtrack, released in 2005, features 4 tracks with lyrics written by P. Vijay and Kabilan.

Track	Song	Singer(s)	Duration
1	"Intha Kaadu"	Tippu	2:56
2	"Anthari Sunthari"	Malathy Lakshman, Manikka Vinayagam	4:17
3	"Arasiyale"	Gangai Amaran, Mohan	2:12
4	"Rendu"	Prasanna, Saindhavi	1:10

== Reception ==
The film received negative reviews from critics with Malathi Rangarajan of The Hindu stating, "Veerappan would probably do a somersault in his grave if he sees himself portrayed as a gullible nincompoop on the one hand and an honest Minister on the other. And all these without an iota of finesse". Sify said, " a disappointing venture as screenplay and direction goes haywire as the dialogue writer and director does far too much political pontification" and labelled the film as avoidable. Indiaglitz wrote, "that is tantamount to practising for the Olympics marathon by jogging in the park. Satire needs punch and power. But that is sadly missing in this. Padhavi Paduthum Paadu, in that sense, misses the wood for trees". Visual Dasan of Kalki said the film had unexpected twists while praising the satire and some of the characters has resemblance to real life politicians but panned Anamika and editing and concluded saying avoid if you care about logic or if you want to enjoy without worries, you can watch it.
