= Minor Mappillai =

- Poster
- Directed by: V. C. Guhanathan
- Written by: V. C. Guhanathan
- Produced by: K. Raghava
- Starring: Ajith Kumar; Ranjith; Rajkumar; Subhashri; Keerthana
- Cinematography: K. B. Ahmed
- Edited by: R. T. Annadurai
- Music by: Isaivanan
- Production company: Victory Movies
- Release date: 28 June 1996
- Running time: 148 minutes
- Country: India
- Language: Tamil

Minor Mappillai (transl. Minor Son-in-Law) is a 1996 Indian Tamil-language comedy film directed by V. C. Guhanathan. The film stars Ajith Kumar, Ranjith, newcomer Rajkumar, Subhashri, and Keerthana in lead roles; Srividya, Vadivelu, and Vivek appear in supporting roles. It was released on 28 June 1996. The film is a remake of the director's own Telugu film Paruvu Prathishta (1993).

== Plot ==
Ramu (Ajith Kumar) and Moses (Ranjith) are orphans and small-time crooks who make a living by cheating people with the help of their sidekicks. One day, they clashed with the drug smuggler "Challenge" Sankaralingam (Ajay Rathnam). Meanwhile, the college students Dilip (Rajkumar) and Rekha (Subhashri) fall in love with each other. Rekha's father "Kuppathotti" Govindaswamy (Vadivelu) is a wealthy industrialist who was a beggar in the past, while Dilip's mother "Royal" Rajalakshmi (Srividya) is an arrogant woman born with a silver spoon in her mouth. Later, Govindaswamy and Rajalakshmi compete for the Royal Recreation Club presidency, and Govindaswamy wins the election. Rajalakshmi cannot digest the loss. One day, Moses poses as a foreigner and scams Govindaswamy.

Govindaswamy accepts to arrange the marriage of his daughter with Dilip, so he meets Rajalakshmi in her house and tries to convince her, but Rajalakshmi humiliates him. Rekha then challenges Rajalakshmi that Rekha will marry Dilip with her consent. Thereafter, Ramu and Moses are caught by the people they have cheated. Govindaswamy comes to their rescue and saves the two friends from the angry mob.

Govindaswamy gives them a mission: one of them should seduce Rajalakshmi's daughter Seetha (Keerthana). Ramu becomes Rajalakshmi's car driver. Ramu and Seetha eventually fall in love with each other. The lovers secretly marry with the support of Dilip. Rajalakshmi disowns her daughter and humiliates Ramu. Ramu decides to make an honest living, so Moses gifts him a taxi, and Ramu becomes a taxi driver. Later, Seetha becomes pregnant.

One day, Ramu witnesses the murder of a reporter by Sankaralingam's henchmen and escapes from them. Later that day, Ramu takes his pregnant wife with him to the hospital, and the henchmen attack him. At the hospital, Ramu is in a serious condition, while Seetha is about to give birth. Sankaralingam and his henchmen decide to kill Ramu in the hospital, but Moses comes to his rescue and saves him. Ramu is back to his feet and Seetha gives birth. Rajalakshmi eventually puts her ego aside: she now supports her daughter's love and accepts Ramu as her son-in-law.

== Cast ==
- Ajith Kumar as Ramu
- Ranjith as Moses
- Rajkumar as Dilip
- Subhashri as Rekha
- Keerthana as Seetha
- Bharathi as Ramu and Moses's friend
- Srividya as "Royal" Rajalakshmi
- Vadivelu as "Kuppathotti" Govindaswamy
- Vivek as Kicha
- Ajay Rathnam as "Challenge" Sankaralingam
- S. N. Lakshmi as Lakshmi, Ramu's grandmother
- Sorooba as Potential bride
- Initha as Seetha's sister
- Mohan Raman as Mohan Ram, Rajalakshmi's husband
- Manager Cheena as K. Punniyakodi
- T. K. S. Chandran as Potential bride's father
- T. K. S. Natarajan as Bhagavathar
- Karuppu Subbiah
- Thideer Kannaiah as Telugu Man
- Kovai Senthil as Bus Conductor
- Joker Thulasi as Govindaswamy's assistant
- Bonda Mani as Ramu and Moses's friend
- Idichapuli Selvaraj as Cinema Producer
- Y. G. Mahendra as Vathalakundu Vaanchiraja
- Ilavarasan as Lecturer
- LIC Narasimhan as College Principal
- Shanmugasundari as Sundari

== Production ==
The film developed in production under the title Minor Moses.

== Soundtrack ==
The music was composed by Isaivanan.

Track listing
No.	Title	Singer(s)	Length
1.	"Isai Pola Kalai"	Mano, K. J. Yesudas	5:38
2.	"Kikku Romba"	S. P. Balasubrahmanyam	4:23
3.	"Nethuvara"	Malaysia Vasudevan	4:34
4.	"Thanthi Kodu"	Mano	4:58
5.	"Then Madurai Malli"	Mano	4:20
6.	"Va Va Vanam"	S. P. Balasubrahmanyam	4:37
Total length:			28:27

== Reception ==
D. S. Ramanujam of The Hindu wrote, "The main theme of Victory Movies' Minor Maapillai has figured in many earlier Tamil movies and veteran director V. C. Guhanathan being aware of it concentrates on humorous aspects of the drama where Vadivelu and Vivek have a field day".
