= Avathara Purushan =

- Directed by: Pandiyan Arivali
- Written by: Pandiyan Arivali
- Produced by: A. Jagannanthan; Kasthuri Ananth
- Starring: Ranjith; Anand; Sivaranjani
- Cinematography: Sekhar V. Joseph
- Edited by: Gowri–Parry
- Music by: Sirpy
- Production company: Super Hit Movies
- Release date: 28 June 1996
- Running time: 120 minutes
- Country: India
- Language: Tamil

Avathara Purushan (transl. Incarnated Husband) is a 1996 Indian Tamil-language drama film directed by Pandiyan Arivali. The film stars Ranjith, Anand and Sivaranjani, with Goundamani, Senthil, Vivek, Veerapandiyan, Thalaivasal Vijay, Kavitha and Karikalan playing supporting roles. It was released on 28 June 1996.

== Plot ==
Anand and Vaishali are college students. Anand falls in love with Vaishali at first sight. When Anand reveals her his love, Vaishali rejects it and she ridicules him. Since that day, he follows her everywhere to tease her. She then complains to the police. Soon, Vaishali becomes pregnant and hides the father's name from her parents. Feeling ashamed about her pregnancy, her family moves to Ooty.

Vaishali finally reveals to her parents that she was raped by a stranger. After giving birth, she drops the baby in front of the rapist's house. Anand didn't understand anything. He was also a student and was the other Anand's worst enemy. Anand was arrested mistakenly and beaten by the police for teasing Vaishali.

Anand takes care of the baby and thinks that the rapist is the other Anand. Both Anands fight but they turn out to be innocents in this affair. In the meantime, Vaishali befriends Raja. What transpires later forms the crux of the story.

== Cast ==
- Ranjith as Anand
- Anand as Anand
- Sivaranjani as Vaishali
- Goundamani as 'Pickpocket' Periyasamy
- Senthil
- Vivek as Adaikalam
- Veerapandiyan as Raja
- Thalaivasal Vijay as Vaishali's father
- Kavitha as Vaishali's mother
- Ganeshkar
- Dhamu
- Bonda Mani
- Mayilsamy
- Idichapuli Selvaraj
- Kovai Senthil
- Jayamani as Karuppu
- Karuppu Subbiah
- Tirupur Ramasamy
- Chelladurai
- Joker Thulasi
- K. B. Kumar
- Mathi
- Master Vijay
- Baby Raani
- Yogeshwari
- Susila
- Nirmala
- Eashwari
- Anupama
- Indhu

== Soundtrack ==
The soundtrack were composed by Sirpy, with lyrics written by Vaali.

Song	Singer(s)	Duration
"Degree Vangi"	Mano	4:05
"Chinamanai Chinamani"	Mano, Ashok	4:23
"Agaya Panthalile"	S. P. Balasubrahmanyam, Sujatha	3:18
"Maththala Satham"	Swarnalatha	4:19
"Unnai Ninachi"	S. P. Balasubrahmanyam, K. S. Chithra	4:58

== Reception ==
D. S. Ramanujam of The Hindu wrote, "An out of the way story line of a college girl forcibly seduced by a student, goes through the pregnancy and hands over the new born to the rightful father making him repent for his action has not been dealt with the seriousness such an issue requires. The artistes chosen have also not been properly guided to produce something extra".
