= Enga Veetu Meenakshi =

- Genre: Family; Romantic comedy Drama
- Written by: dialogue Anandhan Venukopalan; Radhi Bala
- Screenplay by: Radhi Bala
- Directed by: Ramkumar Dass
- Starring: Lollu Sabha Jeeva; Shritha Sivadas
- Theme music composer: Sudharsan Muthukumar
- Country of origin: India
- Original language: Tamil
- No. of seasons: 1
- No. of episodes: 116

Production
- Executive producer: Senkathirselvan
- Producer: R. Thivakaran
- Production location: Tamil Nadu
- Cinematography: Saththappan Narayanan
- Editor: Sathishbarathan
- Camera setup: Multi-camera
- Running time: approx. 22–24 minutes per episode
- Production company: Thaarag Padaipagam

Original release
- Network: Colors Tamil
- Release: 18 October 2021 – 26 March 2022

Enga Veetu Meenakshi is a 2021 Indian Tamil language family drama television series, starring Lollu Sabha Jeeva and Shritha Sivadas in lead roles. The show is produced by Thaarag Padaipagam and directed by Ramkumar Dass, which premiered on 18 October 2021 and ended on 26 March 2022. in Colors Tamil and digitally streams on Voot. Enga Veetu Meenatchi story revolves around a businessman study degree.

== Plot ==
Chithambaram is the son of Deivanayagam's second wife. After Chithambaram's mother died, Deivanayagam and his son moved back to his hometown. Deivanayagam's first wife, Valliyammai, who already has three children, gets shocked and starts hating Chithambaram. Valliyammai hates him more because his arrival in this house is the reason her two elder brothers left the house, and they also started hating Valliyammai and Chithambaram. After a few months, Deivanayagam gets sick, and he gets a promise from Valliyammai to take care of Chithambaram, and he also writes a will to give fifty percent of his assets to Chithambaram and the other half to Valliyammai, and Deivanayagam dies.

(after 27 years)

Chithambaram is 35 years old and still yearns for the love of his mother, Valliyammai. Even though his mother doesn't like him, his two brothers and sister do. Chithambaram runs an event management organization. He requests a bank loan to help his company grow, but the bank manager, Muthaiya rejects the loan application because Chithambaram has no degree. To avenge him, Chithambaram joins an arts college, where he meets Meenakshi, his class professor. Meenakshi's father, Manivasagam, is a family friend of Valliyammai, so Manivasagam introduces Meenakshi to Valliyammai. Valliyammai likes Meenakshi. Meenakshi dislikes Chithambaram's behavior at first, but as she learns more about him and his family, she falls in love with him. Though it was not his fault that the family separated, Chithambaram feels guilty, and he decides to unite the brothers' families with Valliyammai. However, Valliyammai's brothers have separate plans to avenge Chithambaram. Meenakshi's uncle, Meiyappan's son, has expressed interest in marrying her, but she despises him for his arrogance. Will Chithambaram reunite the family and get loved by his mother, Valliyammai? The rest of the story involves whether Meenakshi and Chithambaram get married or not.

== Cast ==
=== Main ===
- Lollu Sabha Jeeva as Chithambaram
- Shritha Sivadas as Meenakshi

=== Supporting ===
- Poornima Bhagyaraj as Valliyammai
- Neepa as Kasthuri
- Bava Lakshmanan as Nalapakam (Chithambaram's Uncle)
- Sangeetha V as Kala (Nalapakam's wife
- Narmatha as Malar (Nalapakam’s Daughter)
- Thushanthika Tharmaseelan as Ranjani (Chithambaram's college friend)
- Vignesh as Rangarajan (Valliyammai's elder brother)
- Sai Lakshmi as Meiyappan's wife
- Rajeshwari as Mahalakshmi (Rangarajan's Wife)
- Raj Kapoor as Chairman Meiyappan
- Aadukalam Naren as Deivanayagam (Chithambaram's father)
- Gnanasambandam as Principal
- Vasu Vikram as Tharmarajan (Valliyammai's elder brother)
- Soundar as Astrologer

=== Cameos ===
- Harishankar as Nambiar
- Bonda Mani as Snake Charmer (Paambaati)

== Production ==
=== Casting ===
Tamil actor Lollu Sabha Jeeva was cast in the male lead role as Chidambaram. Actress Shritha Sivadas was cast in the female lead role as Meenakshi. The series marks the television debut for Shritha Sivadas. Poornima Bhagyaraj were cast as Valliammal the next main leads.

== See also ==
- Tamil television drama
- List of Tamil soap operas
