= Kann Thirandhu Paaramma =

- DVD cover
- Directed by: L. C. Selva
- Written by: L. C. Selva
- Produced by: Leo Raja
- Starring: Sangita; Ranjith
- Cinematography: N. Sivamanohar
- Edited by: V. Chakrapani
- Music by: S. P. Eashwar
- Production company: United And Company
- Distributed by: Guru Shree Art Pictures
- Release date: 4 August 2000
- Country: India
- Language: Tamil

Kann Thirandhu Paaramma (transl. Goddess, please open your eyes and see) is a 2000 Indian Tamil-language devotional film directed by L. C. Selva. The film stars Sangita and Ranjith, while Indhu and Vasu Vikram also appear in supporting roles. The film was released on 4 August 2000.

== Cast ==
- Sangita as Gayatri and Amman
- Ranjith as Prabhu
- Indhu
- Y. Vijaya
- Babu Mohan
- Mahanadhi Shankar
- Vasu Vikram
- Chaplin Balu
- Mahendran
- Ra. Sankaran

== Production ==
United & Co, who worked as distributors for over 505 films, opted to make their first production through the film and opted to spend heavily on visual effects. The director, Selva, had previously apprenticed under K. Vijayan.

== Soundtrack ==
Soundtrack was composed by newcomer S. P. Eeswar.

Track listing
No.	Title	Singer(s)	Length
1.	"Amman Solai"
2.	"Unnai Thaane Amman Endru"	Sujatha Mohan
3.	"Unnai Thaane Amman Endru" (sad)	K. S. Chithra

== Reception ==
Dinakaran wrote, "Newface director Selva L.C. as well as the technical team of the film seem to have handled the problem of audience's reception to the film 'in a taken-for-granted fashion'." Indiainfo wrote, "Lot of graphics to show powers of Amman and Sangeetha’s good acting make the film watch able, but various loose ends mar the film. Easwar’s music consists of typical amman songs that you may have heard before and Sivamanohar’s camera work is average".
