= Chelladurai =

Indian actor

- Died: 7 February 2015
- Occupation: Comedian
- Years active: 1982–2015

Chelladurai (1941 - 7 February 2015) was an Indian comedian who worked in Tamil-language films. He acted in over 350 films.

== Career ==
Chelladurai made his film debut with Thooral Ninnu Pochchu (1982). He is known for his comic sequences with actor Vadivelu.

He became famous for his role in Shree (2002) as the owner of a wine shop named Prabha. In the scene, a thief named Marimuthu (Vadivelu) breaks into the shop and calls the owner and asks when the shop will open. The owner tells him that the store is closed. Vadivelu drinks alcohol and repeatedly disturbs the shop owner during the night.

== Death ==
Chelladurai was admitted to Keezhpakkam Government Hospital in Chennai due to kidney issues on 5 February after having problems for several months. He died on 7 February 2015 due to high blood pressure.

== Selected filmography ==
Films

- Thooral Ninnu Pochchu (1982)
- Murattu Karangal (1986)
- Sundara Kandam (1992)
- Chinna Pasanga Naanga (1992)
- Sentamil Pattu (1992)
- Amma Vanthachu (1992)
- Onna Irukka Kathukanum (1992)
- Chinna Jameen (1993)
- Rajakumaran (1994)
- Thozhar Pandian (1994)
- Sathyavan (1994)
- Thirumoorthy (1995)
- Gandhi Pirantha Mann (1995)
- Seethanam (1995)
- Indian (1996) (uncredited) as customer
- Pudhu Nilavu (1996)
- Katta Panchayathu (1996)
- Avathara Purushan (1996)
- Sakthi (1997)
- Vaimaye Vellum (1997)
- Thaali Pudhusu (1997)
- Pongalo Pongal (1997)
- Taraka Ramudu (1997; Telugu)
- Thadayam (1997)
- Moovendhar (1998)
- Annan (1999)
- Nesam Pudhusu (1999)
- Aasaiyil Oru Kaditham (1999)
- Sundari Neeyum Sundaran Naanum (1999)
- Kannan Varuvaan (2000)
- Simmasanam (2000)
- Ullam Kollai Poguthae (2001)
- Star (2001)
- Red (2002) (uncredited)
- Thamizhan (2002) (uncredited)
- Shree (2002)
- Naina (2002)
- Bagavathi (2002)
- Anbe Sivam (2003)
- Chokka Thangam (2003)
- Dum (2003)
- Saamy (2003)
- Thiruda Thirudi (2003)
- Bheeshmar (2003)
- Winner (2003)
- Vadakku Vaasal (2003)
- Kadhal Kirukkan (2003)
- Ennavo Pudichirukku (2004)
- Settai (2004)
- Jore (2004)
- Jithan (2005) (uncredited) as Apartment watchman
- Karka Kasadara (2005)
- Padhavi Paduthum Paadu (2005)
- Varapogum Sooriyane (2005)
- Mudhal Aasai (2005)
- Anbe Vaa (2005)
- Aanai (2005)
- Thalai Nagaram (2006)
- Aavani Thingal (2006)
- Manikanda (2007)
- Viyabari (2007)
- Piragu (2007)
- Vel (2007)
- Thangam (2008)
- Kee Mu (2008)
- Durai (2008)
- Ellam Avan Seyal (2008)
- Sirithal Rasipen (2009)
- Kanthaswamy (2009)
- Vettaikaaran (2009)
- Sura (2010)
- Mambattiyan (2011)
- Pathayeram Kodi (2013)
- Tenaliraman (2014)
- Pagadai Pagadai (2014)
- Killadi (2015)
- Madha Gaja Raja (2025; Posthumous release)

Television

- Chithi (1999-2001)
- Metti Oli (2002-2005)
- Kana Kaanum Kaalangal (2006-2009)
