= Vishwanath (1996 film) =

- Directed by: K. Goutham Krishna
- Written by: K. Goutham Krishna
- Produced by: P. Veeramuthu
- Starring: Saravanan; Mohini; Swathi
- Cinematography: K. S. Selvaraj
- Edited by: Udhaya Sankar
- Music by: Deva
- Production company: Janaki Ammal Movies
- Release date: 16 August 1996
- Running time: 135 minutes
- Country: India
- Language: Tamil

Vishwanath is a 1996 Indian Tamil-language action thriller film directed by K. Goutham in his debut. The film stars Saravanan, Mohini and Swathi, with Radha Ravi, Prakash Raj, Manivannan, Senthil and Sindhu playing supporting roles. It was released on 16 August 1996.

== Plot ==
The film starts with the convict Vishwanath escaping from jail. Vishwanath is searched for by the whole state, and his photo is on the front pages of every newspaper. One day, Swathi sees him near her house, and in fear of him, she runs away. Swathi lives with her sister Sindhu in a bungalow. One day, her sister falls unconscious and Vishwanath checks her like a doctor. Vishwanath then tells Sindhu about his tragic past.

In the past, Vishwanath was a doctor working in a clinic owned by Michael, a greedy hospital owner. They clashed due to a difference of opinion between them : Michael gave more importance to money, whereas Vishwanath gave more importance to human life. Vishwanath resigned from his work and got an offer from a better hospital. Thereafter, Michael's hospital went bankrupt while Vishwanath's hospital was gaining popularity. Under debts, Michael decided to treat illegal terrorists in his clinic and got a huge amount of money to treat them. With the help of the terrorists, Michael hid weapons in Vishwanath's hospital, thereafter Vishwanath was arrested for 'illegal possession of weapons' in his hospital. Michael even killed the innocent doctor Jenifer to hide the truth behind his illegal activities.

The police officer Rajkumar is charged to catch the convict Vishwanath. In the meantime, Swathi falls in love with Vishwanath. What transpires next forms the rest of the story.

== Cast ==
- Saravanan as Vishwanath
- Mohini as Jenifer
- Swathi as Swathi
- Radha Ravi as Rajkumar
- Prakash Raj as Michael
- Manivannan as Narayanan
- Senthil as Shankarlal
- Sindhu as Sindhu
- T. S. Raghavendra
- V. Gopalakrishnan as Bank official
- Idichapuli Selvaraj as Selvaraj
- Karuppu Subbiah as Khadir Bhai
- Thideer Kannaiah
- Kumarimuthu
- Mahanadi Shankar as David
- Arulmani
- Jyothi Meena as an item number

== Soundtrack ==
The soundtrack was composed by Deva, with lyrics written by Vaali.

| Song | Singer(s) | Duration |
|---|---|---|
| "Kartharai Parthen" | K. S. Chithra, S. P. Balasubrahmanyam | 4:49 |
| "1,2,3,4,5,6, Yenn Phone" | K. S. Chithra | 4:34 |
| "Jil Endru Veesuthu" | Sujatha Mohan, Unni Menon | 4:10 |
| "Mama Nan Unakku" | K. S. Chithra | 4:14 |
| "Gongura" | Mano, Swarnalatha | 4:02 |

== Reception ==
D. S. Ramanujam of The Hindu wrote, " Debutant director K. Goutham (the story and screenplay are also his) by projecting these two segments with the comedy track of Manivannan and Senthil manages to maintain an even tempo, and loses his thinking cap in the end portions".
