= Ranjith (actor) =

Indian actor (born 1972)

- Born: 15 November 1972 (age 53); Coimbatore, Tamil Nadu, India
- Occupations: Actor; Film director; Politician
- Years active: 1993–2015; 2020–present
- Spouses: Priya Raman (m. 1999) Ragasudha (m. 2014; div. 2015)
- Children: 2

Ranjith (born 15 November 1972) is an Indian actor and director who appears in Tamil and Malayalam language films. In 2024, he participated in the reality show Bigg Boss 8 as a contestant.

== Acting career ==
After completing a course in acting, Ranjith made his acting debut in 1993 with Pon Vilangu, directed by K. S. Rajkumar, was produced by R. K. Selvamani. The critic K. Vijayan of New Straits Times praised Ranjith's acting citing that "Ranjith, despite his big build, impresses in his debut performance." The next year, he acted in the lead role in the rural drama Sindhu Nathi Poo (1994).

In 1996, he appeared in Minor Mappillai and in Avathara Purushan. In the start of 1998, Ranjith played as an antagonist in Maru Malarchi opposite Mammooty, the film was released to critical acclaim and he won the Tamil Nadu State Film Award for Best Villain for his role. He later acted in Ninaithen Vandhai then the blockbuster Natpukkaga and played the villain role in Dharma. He appeared in the supporting role in Desiya Geetham and Pudhumai Pithan while he played one of the leads in the low-budget film Cheran Chozhan Pandian. He resumes his role in the Telugu drama Sneham Kosam (1999), remake of Natpukkaga directed by K. S. Ravikumar.

From 1999 to 2001, he had predominantly appeared in supporting and villain roles except in Nesam Pudhusu and Kann Thirandhu Paaramma where he played the lead role. In 2003, Ranjith directed, produced and played the title role in Bheeshmar (2003).

Ranjith later acted in Malayalam movies such as Natturajavu (2004), Rajamanikyam (2005), Chandrolsavam (2005) and Lokanathan IAS (2005).

He has acted as the lead role in Aadhikkam (2005), Padhavi Paduthum Paadu (2005), Pasupathi c/o Rasakkapalayam (2007), Kasimedu Govindan (2008) and Munnar (2009) as well as in supporting role in Thambikku Indha Ooru (2010), Gowravargal (2010), Sagaptham (2015) and Adhibar (2015).

Ranjith made his small-screen debut with Vijay TV’s Senthoora Poove. He is particularly known for his role in the popular serial Baakiyalakshmi which exposed him to a broader audience, cementing his place in the industry.

Initially scheduled to release in February 2024, due to the controversies surrounding the film, his self-directed drama film titled Kavundampalayam was pushed to August 2024.

In 2024, he participated in the reality television series Bigg Boss 8 as a contestant. He was later evicted from the show on day 77 at 13th place.

== Political career ==
Ranjith was a member and spokesperson of the All India Anna Dravida Munnetra Kazhagam for many years. After the death of AIADMK supremo Jayalalithaa in December 2016, Ranjith started to support O. Panneerselvam's faction of AIADMK. In July 2018, Ranjith left the AIADMK and joined the Pattali Makkal Katchi as the new deputy leader of the party. On 26 February 2019, Ranjith, the vice president of PMK, quit the party citing that he could not digest S. Ramadoss and Anbumani Ramadoss' change of stance in supporting the AIADMK in the 2019 Indian general election. The next day, Ranjith met Amma Makkal Munnetra Kazhagam's general secretary T. T. V. Dhinakaran and joined the party officially.

== Controversies ==
In August 2024, Ranjith sparked controversy while speaking to media, saying that caste-based honor killing was not violence; rather, it was a parent's way of showing their care towards their children. He later retracted his statement, saying that he "oppose[s] all forms of killing".

== Filmography ==
=== Tamil films ===
List of Ranjith's Tamil film credits
Year	Film	Role	Notes
1993	Pon Vilangu	Muthu	
1994	Sindhu Nathi Poo	Thirukkaval (Sakthivel)	
1996	Minor Mappillai	Moses	
1996	Avathara Purushan	Anand	
1997	Bharathi Kannamma	Maayan	
1998	Maru Malarchi	Manimaran	Won—Tamil Nadu State Film Award for Best Villain
1998	Ninaithen Vandhai	Vignesh	
1998	Natpukkaga	Pasupathy (Sirusu)	
1998	Adra Sakka Adra Sakka	Ranjith	
1998	Dharma	Ranjith	
1998	Desiya Geetham	Ganga	
1998	Pudhumai Pithan	Mahesh	
1998	Cheran Chozhan Pandian	Cheran	
1999	Ninaivirukkum Varai	Sadha	
1999	Poomaname Vaa	Nadaraj	
1999	Kummi Paattu	Selvarasu	
1999	Ponvizha	Velusamy	
1999	Nesam Pudhusu	Ranjith	
1999	Manaivikku Mariyadhai	Naresh	
1999	Hello	Sekhar	
1999	Iraniyan	Police officer	
1999	Sundari Neeyum Sundaran Naanum	Sivaramakrishnan	
2000	Eazhaiyin Sirippil	Doctor	Guest appearance
2000	Sudhandhiram	Vikram	
2000	Kannan Varuvaan	Raghu	
2000	Magalirkkaga	Subramani	
2000	Ennamma Kannu	Vishwa	
2000	Kann Thirandhu Paaramma	Prabhu	
2000	Sabhash	Dharan	
2001	Narasimha	C. P. Sharma	
2001	Kanna Unnai Thedukiren		
2001	Aandan Adimai	Ranjith	
2001	Pandavar Bhoomi	Dhanapal	
2001	Manadhai Thirudivittai	Ranjith	
2003	Bheeshmar	Bheeshmar	Also director
2005	Aadhikkam	Naaga/Durai	
2005	Padhavi Paduthum Paadu	Malayappan	
2006	Don Chera	Cheran (Don Chera)	
2007	En Uyirinum Melana	Vikram	Guest appearance
2007	Pasupathi c/o Rasakkapalayam	Pasupathi	
2007	Thirumagan	Sivankaalai	
2008	Valluvan Vasuki	Anandha Konar	
2008	Kasimedu Govindan	Govindan	
2009	Munnar	Karthikeyan	
2010	Thambikku Indha Ooru	Thirumalai	
2010	Gowravargal	Nainar	
2015	Sagaptham	Chinrasu	
2015	Adhibar	Easwaran	
2024	Kavundampalayam	Kuzhanthai	Also Director
2025	Irudhi Muyarchi	Ravichandran	

=== Malayalam films ===
List of Ranjith's Malayalam film credits
Year	Film	Role	Notes
2004	Natturajavu	Karnan	
2005	Rajamanikyam	Simon Nadar	
2005	Chandrolsavam	Ramanunni	
2005	Lokanathan IAS	Brahmanandan	
2007	Janmam		
2010	Thanthonni	Neelakantan	
2011	August 15	Kannan	
2012	Oru Kudumba Chithram	Varunagiri	
2014	Little Superman	Wilson	
2017	My School		
2019	Mangalath Vasundhara		
2024	Kadakan		

=== Telugu film ===
List of Ranjith's Telugu film credits
Year	Film	Role
1999	Sneham Kosam	Chinababu

=== Television series ===
List of television series credits
Year	Title	Role	Language	Channel	Notes
2020–2022	Senthoora Poove	Duraisingam	Tamil	Star Vijay	Lead role
2023–2024	Baakiyalakshmi	Pazhaniswami	Tamil	Star Vijay	Supporting role
2024	Bigg Boss 8	Contestant	Tamil	Star Vijay	Evicted Day 77
2026–present	Thai Maaman	Mayandi	Tamil	Star Vijay	Lead role

=== Voice artist ===
- Manoj Bharathiraja – Kadal Pookkal (2001)
