= Thadayam =

- Poster
- Directed by: Ramesh Balakrishnan
- Written by: Ramesh Balakrishnan; Liaquat Ali Khan (dialogues)
- Produced by: Jothi Prasad
- Starring: Vijayashanti; Ramki; Indraja
- Cinematography: S. V. Rajakishan Sagar
- Edited by: Banerji; Rambabu
- Music by: Deva
- Production company: Maruthi Movie Makers
- Release date: 28 November 1997
- Running time: 135 minutes
- Country: India
- Language: Tamil

Thadayam (transl. Clue) is a 1997 Indian Tamil language film directed by Ramesh Balakrishnan. The film stars Vijayashanti, Ramki and Indraja. It was released on 28 November 1997.

== Plot ==
Chandrasekhar alias Chandru, is a graduate but he cannot find a job so he often goes to jail for earning a living. He lives with his friend Jeeva. Jothi, a fearless criminal lawyer, fights against injustice. Chandru falls in love with Devi while Jothi is in love with Chandru.

== Cast ==
- Vijayashanti as Advocate Jyothi
- Ramki as Chandru (Chandrasekhar)
- Indraja as Devi
- Nagesh as Jyothi's Grandfather
- Radha Ravi as Jyothi's father, Dhanashekar
- Devan as Pandian, leader of a Rebel Group
- Delhi Ganesh as Somu, Dhanashekar's PA
- Rami Reddy as Jail Superintendent Pandidurai
- Vadivelu as Neethidevan M.A., PA to advocate Jyothi
- Uday Prakash as Jeeva, member of Pandian's group
- Vinodhini as Jyothi
- V. Gopalakrishnan
- Alex
- Mahanadi Shankar as Pandian's henchman
- Jaguar Thangam
- Chelladurai as Vadivelu
- Vittal Rao
- Idichapuli Selvaraj as Constable

== Soundtrack ==
The soundtrack was composed by Deva.

Song	Singer(s)	Lyrics	Duration
"Kaadhalane"	Swarnalatha	Vaasan	5:03
"Luck Luck"	Vadivelu	Vaali	5:09
"Oh Poornima"	P. Unni Krishnan, K. S. Chithra	Vaali	4:59
"Oh Thevathaye"	P. Unni Krishnan	Ponniyin Selvan	5:22
"Velli Velli"	Mano, Amrutha	Vaali	5:05

== Reception ==
K. N. Vijiyan of New Straits Times wrote, "Those who like court scenes and Vijayasanthi would like Thadayam".
