= Mahanadi Shankar =

Indian stage and film actor

- Born: 16 January 1966 (age 60)
- Occupation: Actor
- Years active: 1992 –present
- Spouse: Selvi
- Children: 3

Mahanadi Shankar is an Indian actor and stuntman who has appeared in Tamil language films and television serials, playing mostly supporting and negative roles. He has starred in films such as Mahanadhi (1994), Baashha (1995), Ratchagan (1997), Amarkkalam (1999), and Dheena (2001). The success of the former film meant that he used the title as a prefix to his stage name.

== Career ==
Shankar was introduced to the film industry initially as a stuntman and action choreographer in 1986. He focused on fight sequences in film portions while working as a stuntman from 1986 to 1993. He worked as an assistant to established stunt masters, including FEFSI Vijayan, Vikram Dharma, and Raju Sundaram during this time.

Shankar received the opportunity to act in the film Mahanadhi (1994) through his stunt master guru Vikram Dharma, who pushed Shankar to the core. It was Vikram Dharma who convinced Shankar to gain weight in order to make a noteworthy appearance in the film. By this time, Shankar weighed only 66 kilograms (143 pounds), and within three months, he had pushed it to 82 kilograms (180 pounds) in order to cash in on the opportunity to act in the film. During the film's shooting, filmmakers planned to rope in a dubbing artist to give a voiceover to the role to be played by Shankar, but the film's lead actor Kamal Haasan insisted that there was no need for a dubbing artist and recommended that Shankar himself has a fine slang and urged filmmakers to utilize Shankar's voice throughout the film for Shankar's portions.

Shankar eventually made his fully-fledged acting debut in Mahanadhi. Following his notable performance, he has worked in several Tamil films in the 1990s, 2000s, and 2010s as a supporting actor, often as an antagonist or a comic villain.

In the film Dheena (2001), Shankar referred to the film's lead actor Ajith Kumar as "Thala" in a song. Subsequently, Ajith was called "Thala" by all his fans. He made a reunion with Ajith after a gap of 22 years with the film Thunivu (2023), in which he played a police constable.

== Filmography ==
- Amma Vanthachu (1992)
- Singaravelan (1992)
- Mahanadhi (1994)
- Namma Annachi (1994)
- Vanaja Girija (1994)
- Aasai (1995)
- Baashha (1995)
- En Pondatti Nallava (1995)
- Ragasiya Police (1995)
- Indian (1996)
- Panchalankurichi (1996)
- Senathipathi (1996)
- Vaazhga Jananayagam (1996)
- Vishwanath (1996)
- Abhimanyu (1997)
- Pagaivan (1997)
- Pasamulla Pandiyare (1997)
- Ratchagan (1997)
- Thadayam (1997)
- Golmaal (1998)
- Dhinamdhorum (1998)
- Veeram Vilanja Mannu (1998)
- Pudhumai Pithan (1998)
- Thullatha Manamum Thullum (1999)
- Amarkkalam (1999)
- Adutha Kattam (1999)
- Malabar Police (1999)
- Unnai Thedi (1999)
- Kann Thirandhu Paaramma (2000)
- Manu Needhi (2000)
- Dheena (2001)
- Dosth (2001)
- Alli Thandha Vaanam (2001)
- Alli Arjuna (2002)
- Red (2002)
- Amaiyappan (2002)
- Charlie Chaplin (2002)
- Ivan (2002)
- Shree (2002)
- Arputham (2002)
- Maaran (2002)
- Game (2002)
- Ramanaa (2002)
- Ramachandra (2003)
- Naam (2003)
- Galatta Ganapathy (2003)
- Anjaneya (2003) as Kulithalai Samy
- Ottran (2003)
- Gajendra (2004)
- Arasatchi (2004)
- Giri (2004)
- Jaisurya (2004)
- Jananam (2004)
- Iyer IPS (2005)
- Sukran (2005)
- Chanakya (2005)
- Mazhai (2005)
- Kusthi (2006)
- Vanjagan (2006)
- Perarasu (2006)
- Vathiyar (2006)
- Thottal Poo Malarum (2007)
- Thiru Ranga (2007)
- Marudhamalai (2007)
- Kannamoochi Yenada (2007)
- Tharagu (2008)
- Vasool (2008)
- Siva Manasula Sakthi (2009)
- Brahmadeva (2009)
- Sirithal Rasipen (2009)
- Engal Aasan (2009)
- Sindhanai Sei (2009)
- Vedappan (2009)
- Munnar (2009)
- Sura (2010)
- Tamizh Padam (2010)
- Oru Kal Oru Kannadi (2012)
- Mirattal (2012)
- Etho Seithai Ennai (2012)
- Aachariyangal (2012)
- Idharkuthane Aasaipattai Balakumara (2013)
- Amara (2014)
- Vellaikaara Durai (2014)
- Yaamirukka Bayamey (2014)
- Kalkandu (2014)
- Vindhai (2015)
- Eli (2015)
- Vandha Mala (2015)
- Veera Sivaji (2016)
- Vaaliba Raja (2016)
- Sutta Pazham Sudatha Pazham (2016)
- Jackson Durai (2016)
- Azhahendra Sollukku Amudha (2016)
- Motta Shiva Ketta Shiva (2017)
- Julieum 4 Perum (2017)
- Senjittale En Kadhala (2017)
- Saravanan Irukka Bayamaen (2017)
- Padaiveeran (2018)
- Irumbu Thirai (2018)
- Dev (2019)
- Shree Atharvana Prathyangira (2019; Kannada)
- 100 (2019)
- Jackpot (2019)
- Petromax (2019)
- Butler Balu (2019)
- Sollunganne Sollunga (2020)
- Chithirame Solladi (2020)
- Master (2021)
- Parris Jeyaraj (2021)
- IPC 376 (2021)
- Gulu Gulu (2022)
- Thunivu (2023)
- Pallu Padama Paathukka (2023)
- Kulasami (2023)
- Jailer (2023)
- Tha Naa (2024)
- Uyir Thamizhukku (2024)
- Kadaisi Ulaga Por (2024)
- Maargan (2025)
- Good Bad Ugly (2025) as a narrator
- Gandhi Kannadi (2025; uncredited)
- Lucky the Superstar (2026)
- Leader (2026)
- Sandakkari (2026)

== Television ==
Year	Title	Role	Channel
2010–2015	Nadhaswaram	Neliandavar	Sun TV
2018	Maya	Pasupathi (Saalappaa)	Sun TV
2018	Nandini	Sathyanarayan	Sun TV; Udaya TV
2020–2024	Vanathai Pola	Sankarapandi	Sun TV
2024–Present	Annam	Saamydurai	Sun TV
