= Pudhumai Pithan (1998 film) =

- Theatrical release poster
- Directed by: S. K. Jeeva
- Written by: R. N. R. Manohar (dialogues)
- Screenplay by: S. K. Jeeva
- Story by: Mohandass
- Produced by: Henry
- Starring: Parthiban; Roja; Devayani; Priya Raman
- Cinematography: Siva Manohar
- Edited by: Peter Bhabiyaa
- Music by: Deva
- Production company: Pangaj Productions
- Release date: 20 October 1998
- Running time: 145 minutes
- Country: India
- Language: Tamil

Pudhumai Pithan is a 1998 Indian Tamil-language political satire film directed by S. K. Jeeva. The film stars Parthiban, Roja, Devayani and Priya Raman, while Anandaraj and Ranjith play key roles. It was released on 20 October 1998, during Diwali. The film was later dubbed into Telugu as Oka Votu.

== Plot ==
Jeeva, a social activist, ends up in a police lock-up. Mahesh, a police officer and his best friend, brings Jeeva to his home. Mahesh lives happily with his wife Aarthi and his daughter.

Aarthi and Jeeva were in love in the past. Ramadass, Aarthi's father, hated Jeeva and his activism. As an honest police officer, Ramadass protected a corrupt politician and was beaten by Jeeva's supporters. Later, Aarthi and Jeeva split up. Jeeva clashes with the same politician, his whole family dies due to his orders and Jeeva was sent to a mental hospital. Gayathri, a nurse, helps him to escape from the hospital and then she accommodates him in her house from where he later fled.

Now, Jeeva changes his name and is determined to clean up the society. He also falls in love with the prostitute Shenbagam. Jeeva as Bharath becomes popular among the poor and subsequently becomes a minister.

== Cast ==
- Parthiban as Jeeva / Bharath
- Roja as Shenbagam
- Devayani as Aarthi
- Priya Raman as Gayathri
- Anandaraj
- Ranjith as Mahesh
- Jai Ganesh as Ramadass
- Vadivelu as 'Super' Suruli
- S. S. Chandran
- Charle
- Delhi Ganesh as Viswanath
- Vasu Vikram as Karimuthu
- Laxmi Rattan
- Sabitha Anand as Bhavani, Jeeva's sister
- Dubbing Janaki as Jeeva's mother
- Bala Singh
- Thiruppur Ramasamy as Ramasamy
- Idichapuli Selvaraj
- Joker Thulasi
- Shilpa as Anandraj's daughter
- Mahanadi Shankar
- Crane Manohar as 'Super' Suruli's sidekick
- Kovai Senthil
- MRK
- Bayilvan Ranganathan
- Muthukaalai
- Baby Hemalatha
- Shakeela as Vanaja
- John Babu in a cameo appearance

== Production ==
Gautami was originally chosen as one of the actresses but due to her marriage she was replaced by Priya Raman.

== Soundtrack ==
The soundtrack was composed by Deva.

Song	Singer(s)	Lyrics	Duration
"Namma Kuppamellam"	Deva	Nandalala	4:39
"Odudhada Namma"	S. P. Balasubrahmanyam	Pulamaipithan	5:25
"Onnu Rendu" (male)	Hariharan	Thamarai	5:12
"Onnu Rendu" (female)	K. S. Chithra	Thamarai	5:14
"Sirikkathae Ennai"	S. P. Balasubrahmanyam, Sujatha Mohan	Palani Bharathi	3:53
"Unnai Kandaen"	Swarnalatha	Nandalala	5:19

== Reception ==
A critic from Dinakaran noted "The film has tried to establish how a politician could be a good leader too! But it's rather surprising to note how so experienced an artiste like Parthiban forgot the fact that such a subject when dealt with in cinema medium has to be told in an uniformly interesting manner from the beginning till the end". Kala Krishnan Ramesh from Deccan Herald wrote, "the film is often downright silly, when not crass, but it has a kind of senseless appeal. To be honest, it hasn’t gone as far overboard as it could have with its masala mix. It, commendably, has no scenes of communal violence, no religious chauvinism, and its single rape scene is cut short by the mother shooting dead her about-to-be-raped daughter".

K. N. Vijiyan of New Straits Times called it "one of the best movies of the year. See it if you appreciate meaningful movies". Ji of Kalki wrote that despite the three heroines, the film has a documentary feel to it, and congratulated director Jeeva himself for taking on an otherwise responsible venture. D. S. Ramanujam of The Hindu wrote, "No doubt, debutant director, Jeeva, has adopted cinematic solutions to a few issues but overall, he generates an atmosphere suggesting that everything is not lost, if the electorate uses its vote weapon properly to choose the right person".
