= Jai Soorya =

- Poster
- Directed by: Manoj Kumar
- Written by: Manoj Kumar
- Produced by: Manoj Kumar; Selvi Manoj Kumar
- Starring: Arjun; Laila; Chaya Singh
- Cinematography: A. Karthik Raja
- Edited by: P. Mohan Raj
- Music by: Deva
- Production company: Guru Films
- Distributed by: Lakshmipriya Combines
- Release date: 19 December 2004
- Country: India
- Language: Tamil

Jai Soorya is a 2004 Indian Tamil-language action film directed by Manoj Kumar. The film stars Arjun in dual roles, alongside Laila, Chaya Singh and Vadivelu in pivotal roles. It was released on 19 December 2004.

== Plot ==
Surya, a cunning con artist, uses his skills for personal gain, manipulated by the highest bidder. However, his tricks eventually backfire, leading to the dismissal of both the Assistant Commissioner and the Police Minister, who were his clients. Seeking revenge, they enlist the help of Pasupathy, a notorious criminal in Madras. Pasupathy is then hired by a Calcutta-based goon to kidnap the collector of Kancheepuram. Surya, seeing an opportunity, decides to thwart Pasupathy's plan and rescue the collector. In a surprising twist, he discovers that the collector, Jai Anand, is his doppelganger. As Surya learns more about Jai's past in Calcutta from his fiancée Priya, he becomes entangled in a web of intrigue and deception.

== Cast ==
- Arjun Sarja as Jai Anand and Surya
- Laila as Baby
- Chaya Singh as Charupriya
- Vadivelu as Soosai
- Kota Srinivasa Rao as Highways Govindan
- Shobaraj as Pasupathy
- Ilavarasu as ACP
- Raj Kapoor as Police Minister
- Mahanadi Shankar
- Paravai Muniyamma
- Uday Prakash
- T. P. Gajendran
- Bonda Mani
- Ravi Kumar
- Durai Pandian

== Production ==
During the film's launch event in February 2004, producers had put up promotional stills featuring actress Sneha, even though she had not yet signed onto the project. The team subsequently moved quickly to sign Laila, rectifying their error. The filming was held at Kolkata with some of the spots where crucial scenes were shot were the Hooghly bridge, the tram, the Metro, Victoria Mahal and the palace of Maharaja Bharadwaj. A fight scene with village backdrop was shot at Pollachi with three cameras and 150 dancers while another fight was shot at Vishakapatnam for which train was hired for a purpose. The song featuring Arjun and Laila was shot at Arjun's farm at Porur. The filming was also held at Hyderabad and Rajahmundry.

== Soundtrack ==
Music was composed by Deva and released on Five Star Audio.

All lyrics are written by Pa. Vijay.

Track listing
No.	Title	Singer(s)	Length
1.	"Jai Surya"	Timmy, Mathangi	3:07
2.	"Kattuna Avala Kattanumada"	Krishnaraj, Vadivelu, Jayalakshmi	4:50
3.	"Kattuna Avala Kattanumada" (Version 2)	Arjun Sarja, Vadivelu, Jayalakshmi	4:50
4.	"Madha Madha"	Tippu, Anuradha Sriram	5:04
5.	"Theekuchi Penne"	Krishnaraj, Jayalakshmi	4:30
6.	"Vachukka Solli"	Karthik, Febi Mani	4:02
Total length:			26:23

== Release and reception ==
Due to the producer's financial crunch, Jai Soorya's release was delayed for four months, and it was released only on 19 December 2004. Malini Mannath of Chennai Online criticised the film's inconsistent tone, noting, "The problem with the film is that the director doesn't seem to have quite made up his mind whether his narrative style should be a light-hearted one or serious. So it meanders somewhere between the two and ends in a confused amalgam of emotions, with neither the humour nor the intensity really touching one!". Sify wrote, "Arjun, a decent actor is doomed forever playing hero in stereotyped, mass action masalas like Jayasurya, that is crass, crude and is an unmitigated endurance test. The film makes us wonder if the audience in B and C stations are so dumb to accept such inane buffoonery in the name of entertainment!".
