= Naina (2002 film) =

2002 film by Manobala

- DVD cover
- Directed by: Manobala
- Screenplay by: Manobala
- Story by: P. Kalaimani
- Produced by: V. Santhakumar
- Starring: Jayaram; Manya
- Cinematography: Pandian
- Edited by: V. M. Udhayashankar
- Music by: Sabesh–Murali
- Production company: VSK Films
- Release date: 30 August 2002
- Running time: 145 minutes
- Country: India
- Language: Tamil

Naina (transl. Father) is a 2002 Indian Tamil-language comedy horror film directed by Manobala. The film stars Jayaram in a dual role and Manya, with Vadivelu, Ramesh Khanna, Bhanupriya, Kovai Sarala, and Rajan P. Dev playing supporting roles. The film, produced by V. Santhakumar, was released on 30 August 2002.

== Plot ==
The ghost of Annamalai is trying to communicate with his son Pasupathy. The latter, a taxi driver, is in love with the lawyer Vaanathi. Aavudaiyappan, a con medium, becomes the only one who can hear Annamalai. After being annoyed by Annamalai, Aavudaiyappan finally decides to help him. They meet Pasupathy, who seems to hate his deceased father.

In the past, the widower Annamalai was a wealthy man and a womanizer. Every time there was good news in his village, he tonsured Pasupathy's head. He later got married a second time to Azhagu Nachiyar, and they had a daughter. During a ceremony, a person pushed Annamalai from behind in Yajna. The villagers thought that the innocent Pasupathy had killed his father, so he ran away.

Annamalai does not know who killed him. Pasupathy decides to go back to his village. He wants to prove his innocence at all costs and find the one who killed his father. When Azhagu Nachiyar meets Annamalai's brother Velu, she becomes unconscious. Annamalai regains consciousness and makes Azhagu Nachiyar overhear Velu's conversation. It turns out that Velu had killed Annamalai to grab his property and blamed the murder on Pasupathy.

In the climax, Pasupathy performs the last rites of his father, while Velu tries to disrupt the rites. Velu gets burned and also becomes a ghost. In the end, Pasupathy joins his father's position in the village.

== Cast ==
- Jayaram as Annamalai and Pasupathy
- Manya as Vaanathi
- Vadivelu as Aavudaiyappan
- Ramesh Khanna as Pichu
- Bhanupriya as Azhagu Nachiyar
- Kovai Sarala as Angayarkanni
- Rajan P. Dev as Velu
- Delhi Ganesh as Sambu
- Vennira Aadai Moorthy as Mathrubootham
- Charle as Pazhani
- Vaiyapuri
- Thalaivasal Vijay
- Pandu as Pandu and Pundu
- Thyagu as 'Vedigundu' Muthu
- Madhan Bob as Annamalai
- Chelladurai as Chelladurai
- Bonda Mani as Mani
- Jayamani
- Master Bharath as young Pasupathy
- Manobala as voice from heaven
- Aruldoss as man who scolds Aavudaiyappan (uncredited)

== Production ==
The film was shot in Chennai, Ottapalam, Nelliampathi, Thrissur and Alappuzha. Jayaram played dual roles, that of father and son. It was the last film directed by Manobala before his death in 2023.

== Soundtrack ==
The soundtrack was composed by Sabesh–Murali, with lyrics written by Pa. Vijay, Viveka, and K. Subash. Cinematographer Rajiv Menon made his singing debut with this film.

Song	Singer(s)	Duration
"Annamalai Annamalai"	Deva, Krishnaraj	5:01
"Annamalai Annamalai"	Vadivelu, Krishnaraj	4:59
"Jaathi Ponnae"	Karthik, Chitra Sivaraman	5:12
"Kaadhalanae Uyire"	Srinivas, Anuradha Sriram	5:47
"Kichu Kichu"	Rajiv Menon, Mathangi Jagdish	5:46
"Pallikoodam Sellum Megamei"	P. Unni Krishnan, Harini	6:06

== Critical reception ==
Malini Mannath of Chennai Online wrote, "The film probably would have turned out better, if the director was clear as to whether he wanted the film to be a comic caper or a sentimental, suspense thriller. An injudicious blending of both, has resulted in a film that fails to satisfy". The film was also reviewed by Sify.
