= Pongalo Pongal =

- VCD cover
- Directed by: V. Sekhar
- Written by: V. Sekhar
- Produced by: C. Kannappan; S. S. Durairaju; S. Tamilselvi; S. Jayalakshmi
- Starring: Vignesh; Vadivelu; Charle; Chinni Jayanth; Vivek; Sangita; Kovai Sarala; Indhu; Latha
- Cinematography: G. Rajendran
- Edited by: A. P. Manivannan
- Music by: Deva
- Production company: Thiruvalluvar Kalaikoodam
- Release date: 9 May 1997
- Running time: 150 minutes
- Country: India
- Language: Tamil

Pongalo Pongal is a 1997 Indian Tamil-language comedy film directed by V. Sekhar. The film stars Vignesh, Vadivelu, Charle, Chinni Jayanth, and Vivek. Sangita Madhavan Nair, Kovai Sarala, Indhu, and Latha play the female leads. Supporting roles are done by Malaysia Vasudevan, Thyagu, Rajesh, and Vennira Aadai Moorthy. The film had music by Deva, cinematography by G. Rajendran and editing by A. P. Manivannan. The film was released on 9 May 1997, and became a commercial success.

== Plot ==
Subramani, Vellaisamy, Arumugam, and Ponrasu are four friends from poor families; they are graduates but cannot find jobs. Their fathers feel that they are good-for-nothing and decide to corrupt the politician Anja Nenjam to find them a decent job. Anja Nenjam is linked to Pannaiyar, a ruthless landlord who exploited the villagers. Pannaiyar orders him to flee with their money, otherwise, nobody will respect him. Their friend Pazhanisamy, who is supposed to be a supervisor in the city, is back to his village and was also cheated by Anja Nenjam. The five friends, on advice of a retired school teacher, decide to become milk suppliers in their village.

== Cast ==
- Vignesh as Subramani
- Vadivelu as Vellaisamy
- Charle as Arumugam
- Chinni Jayanth as Ponrasu
- Vivek as Pazhanisamy
- Sangita as Chitra
- Kovai Sarala as Meena
- Indhu as Rukku
- Vizhuthugal Latha
- Malaysia Vasudevan as Pannaiyar
- Thyagu as Anja Nenjam
- Rajesh as School Master
- Vennira Aadai Moorthy as Meena's father
- Vasu Vikram as Neighbouring village Pannaiyar's son
- Shanmugasundaram as Pichandi, Subramani's father
- Vadivukkarasi as Subramani's mother
- Kumarimuthu as Vellaisamy's father
- Shanmugasundari as Vellaisamy's mother
- Oru Viral Krishna Rao as Ponrasu's father
- Bonda Mani as Pannaiyar's servant
- Chelladurai as Asha's father

== Soundtrack ==
The soundtrack was composed by Deva, with lyrics by Vaali.

Song	Singer(s)	Duration
"Appanukku Paadam Sonna"	S. P. Balasubrahmanyam, K. S. Chithra, Reshmi	4:34
"Namma Thaikulamthan"	Mano, K. S. Chithra	4:21
"Bsc, Msc"	Mano, Suresh Peters	4:58
"Kalam Namakkunnu"	S. P. Balasubrahmanyam, K. S. Chithra, Reshmi	4:08
"Pattikattu Pattadharigala"	Anuradha Sriram, Krishnaraj	3:59

== Accolades ==
Sekhar won the Cinema Express Award for Best Story.
