= Ottran =

- Poster
- Directed by: Ilankannan
- Written by: Ilankannan
- Produced by: Gandhilal Bansali
- Starring: Arjun; Simran
- Cinematography: K. S. Selvaraj
- Edited by: P. Sai Suresh
- Music by: Pravin Mani
- Production company: Popular Movies
- Release date: 24 October 2003
- Country: India
- Language: Tamil

Ottran (transl. Spy) is a 2003 Indian Tamil-language spy thriller film directed by Ilankannan in his debut. The film stars Arjun and Simran, while Manorama, Vadivelu, Tejashree, and Sarath Babu play supporting roles. The score and soundtrack were composed by Pravin Mani. The film was released on 24 October 2003 and was a success.

== Plot ==
Karthik is an upright RAW agent who is on the trail of an anti-national group who are out to destabilize the country. He lives in a palatial house with his mother in New Delhi. The police in Chennai nab Ali, a terrorist behind the Parliament and temple attack. Sudha and Shiva are the children of Manikkavel IPS, IG-Prisons, police officer who is in charge of bringing Ali to court.

Ali's people kidnap Sudha and blackmails her brother to bring home three terrorists and give them shelter, so he is forced to introduce them as his friends and keep them in his father's official bungalow. Karthik saves Sudha from the terrorist and comes to Chennai to uncover the ISI plan to rescue Ali and create communal tension in the state. How Karthik emerges the winner single-handedly forms the rest of the story.

== Cast ==
- Arjun as Karthik, a RAW agent
- Simran as Sudha
- Sarath Babu as Manikkavel IPS, IG-Prisons
- Vadivelu as Maadasaamy Chettiar
- Manorama as Karthik's mother
- Ambika as Sudha's mother
- Shyam Ganesh as Shiva, Sudha's brother
- Gaurav Chopra as Ghazi Baba
- Hari Nair as Terrorist
- Riyaz Khan as Beer Mohammed
- Ajay Rathnam as SP Saran IPS
- Pyramid Natarajan as Kumara Saamy chettiar
- Chitti Babu as Marriage Broker
- Tejashree as Azhagi
- Mahanadi Shankar
- Anu Mohan as RAW Agent
- Singamuthu as Telephone Booth owner
- Bonda Mani
- Rajeev as Commissioner Rajasekhar IPS
- Sathya Prakash as Mohamed Ali
- Hemanth Ravan
- Dharmesh
- Vimal Raj as Arockiyaraj, Jail Superintendent
- Chitra
- Vishal
- Satheesh
- Ambareesh
- Baby Rani

== Production ==
After the success of the Arjun-directed film Ezhumalai (2002), Arjun and Simran came together again for Ottran. It is the directorial debut of Ilankannan, who earlier apprenticed under S. Shankar. Shooting commenced in Chennai in a 40-day schedule.

== Soundtrack ==
Soundtrack was composed by Pravin Mani. The song "Chinna Veeda" became popular. Bharadwaj was originally chosen to compose the music; however he left the film due to Arjun's intrusion in his work and he was replaced by Pravin Mani.

Track listing
No.	Title	Singer(s)	Length
1.	"Yeh Thiththippey"	Karthik, Suchitra
2.	"Oru Paarvai"	Srinivas, Sujatha
3.	"Chinna Veeda"	Manikka Vinayagam, Srilekha Parthasarathy
4.	"Kitchu Kitchu"	Shankar Mahadevan, Lavanya
5.	"Uttalangadi"	Manikka Vinayagam
6.	"En Kanave"	Srinivas, Sujatha

== Critical reception ==
Malathi Rangarajan of The Hindu wrote, "first half of the film is the screenplay that allows no room for sluggishness or dampeners. The film moves on at breakneck speed and by the time you take a breather it's intermission". Visual Dasan of Kalki called it a combination of patriotism and screen masala. Malini Mannath of Chennai Online wrote "Director Ilankannan (apprenticed with Pavitran, Abhavanan, Shanker), reveals his firm grip on the medium in his very first film. The action follows in such swift succession, that the attention of the audience is glued to the screen, with barely a moment for straying thoughts or mulling over flaws. Well choreographed stunts by Peter Hayen, KS Selvaraj's striking visuals, Saisuresh's slick editing and Pravin Mani's background score ensure that the pace is maintained till the end".
