= Poomaname Vaa =

- Directed by: V. Azhagappan
- Written by: Raja Subramanaian
- Produced by: Nalini
- Starring: Ramarajan; Sangita
- Cinematography: A. Karthik Raja
- Edited by: L. Kesavan
- Music by: Sirpy
- Production company: Nalini Cine Arts
- Distributed by: Continental Enterprises
- Release date: 30 April 1999
- Country: India
- Language: Tamil

Poomaname Vaa is a 1999 Indian Tamil-language romantic drama film written and directed by V. Azhagappan. The film stars Ramarajan and Sangita, while Easwari Rao and Manivannan portrayed supporting roles. The music for the film was composed by Sirpy and the film was released on 30 April 1999.

== Cast ==
- Ramarajan
- Sangita
- Easwari Rao
- Manivannan
- Kavitha
- Vadivelu
- Ranjith
- Vinu Chakravarthy
- Senthil
- Alex
- Pandu
- Halwa Vasu
- MLA Thangaraj
- Editor Sreedhar
- Melur Govindhan
- Vasu Vikram
- Gajapathi

== Production ==
The film was produced under the banner of Nalini Cine Arts by Ramarajan's wife Nalini Ramarajan. During production, the film was labelled as the actor's 40th film and 11th film as a director, but V. Azhagappan was later given the directorial post. The initial cast included other actors such as Chandrasekhar, Manorama and Santhana Bharathi, who eventually did not feature.

== Soundtrack ==
The music was composed by Sirpy.

Song	Singers	Lyrics
"Dhillu Venunda"	Pushpavanam Kuppusamy	Gangai Amaran
"Ennai Thottu Vittu"	S. P. Balasubrahmanyam, K. S. Chithra	Palani Bharathi
"Idhayam Thiranthu"	Kalpana	Palani Bharathi
"Kaathu Kulir"	Swarnalatha, S. P. Balasubrahmanyam	Palani Bharathi
"Kanchipuram"	Swarnalatha, Geetha	Palani Bharathi
"Namma Maapilakku"	Mano	Palani Bharathi
"Nenjukulla"	Sasitharan	Palani Bharathi

== Release and reception ==
Like many of Ramarajan's films in the late 1990s, Poomaname Vaa and Annan had a delayed release, while films such as Sathya Thaai with Suvaluxmi, Thambikku Thaai Manasu with Sanghavi and Kannuppada Povvudhu were cancelled midway through shoot. D. S. Ramanujam from The Hindu noted "The usual zest is missing in Ramarajan. He however manages to fulfil his task. Sangeetha, a capable performer, is out of touch, her repeat expressions not helping her role. The comedy is more for the front benchers".
