= Ellame En Pondattithaan =

- VCD cover
- Directed by: V. Sekhar
- Written by: V. Sekhar
- Produced by: A. M. Rathnam
- Starring: Ramki; Sanghavi
- Cinematography: G. Rajendran
- Edited by: A. P. Manivannan
- Music by: Deva
- Production company: Sri Surya Movies
- Release date: 5 September 1998
- Running time: 152 minutes
- Country: India
- Language: Tamil

Ellame En Pondattithaan (transl. My Wife is Everything) is a 1998 Indian Tamil-language political comedy film directed by V. Sekhar and produced by A. M. Rathnam. The film stars Ramki and Sanghavi, with Manivannan, Radhika, Vadivelu and Charle in pivotal roles. It was released on 5 September 1998.

== Plot ==
Ramki moves to the city to stay at his aunty Radhika's house. Radhika is married to Manivannan, a politician, who forces Radhika to nominate herself for the regional MLA position. Radhika initially refuses the chance but later gets convinced by her nephew to vie in the elections. She later becomes an MLA and wants to help and serve the people. On the other hand, her husband wants to take bribes, misuse power and become rich.

== Cast ==
- Ramki as Muthu
- Sanghavi as Geetha
- Manivannan as Disctrict Secretary Sundarapandian
- Radhika as Meenakshi
- Vadivelu as Ganga
- Vennira Aadai Moorthy as Swamy
- Charle as Peter
- Kovai Sarala as Kaveri
- Kumarimuthu as Anal Poriyar
- Madhan Bob as Sethu
- Thyagu as Azhagu Sundari
- Vichithra as Laila Kumari
- Suryakanth as Soori
- Bala Singh as Politician
- Kalidaas as Police Inspector
- Vadivukkarasi as Meenakshi's friend
- Vasu Vikram as Govinda

== Soundtrack ==
The soundtrack was composed by Deva, with lyrics written by Vaali.

Song	Singer(s)	Duration
"Baalavaakkam Laila"	Deva	4:37
"Kothamalli"	Mano, K. S. Chithra	5:04
"Twinkle Twinkle"	S. P. Balasubrahmanyam, K. S. Chithra	5:15
"Valzhuvar Kuppamthanda"	S. P. Balasubrahmanyam, K. S. Chithra	4:42
"Yenuga Yenunga"	Sujatha Mohan	4:53

== Critical reception ==
A critic from Deccan Herald wrote "there is not any story to speak of, and everything in this film is silly" and "it's impossible to sit through a film like this without wondering who such films are made for." Ji of Kalki wrote the story which starts off uneventfully continues without a hitch then it falls down while praising the performances of Manivannan and Radhika and added at one point of time the story refuses to move away beyond the circle and concluded asking is there any invocation of makers that they will make the fans go home with extreme irritation by moving the scenes so ridiculously. D. S. Ramanujam wrote for The Hindu, "Director V. Sekhar, an expert at family themes has written the story, screenplay and dialogue. He works the plot to an interesting point at the interval". Ramanujam anticipated "a fight by the wife" post-interval, but was dismayed to find only tropes from earlier Tamil films such as "slum eviction, land patta demand, torching of huts, malpractices at fair price shops, pressures on the police to free party workers who have breached the law, engaging goondas to break a fast by women etc".
