= Manaivikku Mariyadhai =

- Directed by: V. C. Guhanathan
- Story by: Pugazhmani
- Produced by: Ramasamy
- Starring: Pandiarajan; Khushbu; Manivannan
- Cinematography: K. B. Ahmed
- Edited by: R. T. Annadurai
- Music by: Sirpy
- Production company: Sri Thenandal Films
- Release date: 1 October 1999
- Country: India
- Language: Tamil

Manaivikku Mariyadhai (transl. Respect for the wife) is a 1999 Indian Tamil-language comedy drama film directed by V. C. Guhanathan and produced by Ramasamy. The film stars Pandiarajan and Khushbu, while Manivannan plays a supporting role. It was released on 1 October 1999.

== Plot ==
Pandiarajan wants to marry a housewife. Kushboo loves and marries Pandiarajan because of her father's betrayal towards his family. Pandiarajan makes her a housewife, earns money and continues being the breadwinner of the family.

One fine day, his office got bankrupt and his job was gone. Kushboo volunteeringly accepts to go work. Her boss Ranjith likes her and tries to force her to marry him. She doesn't accept so Ranjith forcefully kidnaps her and tries to rape her in the moving van. Pandiarajan comes in time to rescue his wife bashes all of Ranjith’s henchmen and at last celebrates his first night in the moving lift.

== Cast ==
- Pandiarajan as Pandian
- Khushbu as Priya
- Manivannan
- Ranjith as Naresh
- Vadivelu as Rajappa
- Kovai Sarala
- S. N. Lakshmi as Pandian's grandmother
- Balu Anand
- K. Natraj

== Soundtrack ==
The music was composed by Sirpy. The song "Alwa Kodukiran" sung by Vadivelu was not picturised in this film however the same song was reused and picturised in Vadagupatti Maapillai also directed by Guhanathan.

| Song | Singers | Lyrics |
|---|---|---|
| "Aakka Poruthathu" | K. S. Chithra, Arunmozhi | Palani Bharathi |
| "Elandapazham" | Arunmozhi, Devie Neithiyar | Palani Bharathi |
| "Rathiri Nerathile" | Swarnalatha, Mano | Palani Bharathi |
| "Thaanguthana" | K. S. Chithra | Palani Bharathi |
| "Alwa Kodukiran" | Vadivelu | Palani Bharathi |

== Reception ==
K. N. Vijiyan of New Straits Times wrote, "This is another of those movies which we can go for a few laughs and then quickly forget".
