= Chanakya (2005 film) =

- Poster
- Directed by: A. Venkatesh
- Written by: Subha (dialogues)
- Story by: Panchu Arunachalam
- Produced by: Vishwas Sundar
- Starring: R. Sarathkumar; Namitha; Laya
- Cinematography: Madhu Ambat
- Edited by: V. T. Vijayan
- Music by: Srikanth Deva
- Production company: Vishwas Films
- Release date: 23 September 2005
- Running time: 152 minutes
- Country: India
- Language: Tamil

Chanakya is a 2005 Indian Tamil-language action film directed by A. Venkatesh and produced by Vishwas Sundar. It stars R. Sarathkumar, Namitha and Laya. The music was composed by Srikanth Deva with cinematography by Madhu Ambat and editing by V. T. Vijayan. The film was released on 23 September 2005.

== Plot ==
Ganesh is an auto driver and a kind-hearted man who goes out of his way to earn money to help the poor and the needy. He likes to be in the limelight. Knowing well that the media would sensationalise anything that has to do with popular people in the city, he kidnaps a businessman, and in another instance, he implicates and submits himself to the police for the murder of an MLA that he does not commit. While he draws maximum publicity in the media, he creates a miserable life for the police. By his repeated pranks, Ganesh establishes himself as a person crazy only for publicity. People begin to call him "Publicity" Ganesh.

Devanayaki owns a restaurant, and several autos run in her name in the local area. She is in love with Ganesh and goes about wooing him. Meanwhile, Anjali approaches Ganesh to act in her ad films in return for handsome money, but she is actually an undercover agent investigating Ganesh's past.

Ganesh has a sorrow past. His past life and the reason for his current deeds are told in a flashback. Ganesh's father is an upright person who works as a clerk in a collectorate in a coastal village. A natural disaster strikes that area, and leaves many homeless in its wake. To ameliorate their problems, the government allocates Rs. 20 crore to help the affected people rehabilitate. Unfortunately, the local assistant collector, the local MLA, and the local SP together form a trio and forget the grant, even while pretending to protect the best interest of the people. Ganesh's father learns of the trio's involvement in the heist and vows to expose them to the public, but the "representatives of authority" frame false charges and deceitfully turn the public outrage against Ganesh's father. In a melee, Ganesh's family is burnt alive. Ganesh escapes to the city, and avenges the death of his family.

Ganesh then orchestrates the killing of the shenanigans.

== Cast ==
- R. Sarathkumar as "Publicity" Ganesh
- Namitha as Deivanayaki
- Laya as Anjali
- Vadivelu as Subramani
- Seetha as Kalyani
- Salim Ghouse as Police commissioner
- Cochin Hanifa as MLA Aalwar
- Vincent Asokan as Assistant Collector
- Ilavarasu as Police inspector
- Meera Krishnan as commissioner's wife
- Mahanadi Shankar as Politician
- LIC Narasimhan as Judge
- Singamuthu as Fight Master
- Halwa Vasu as Vasu
- Mayilsamy as Subramani's customer
- Bonda Mani as Subramani's customer

== Soundtrack ==
Soundtrack was composed by Srikanth Deva.

Song	Singers	Lyrics
"Alaudin"	Srikanth Deva, Vadivelu, Roshini	Vijay Sagar
"Onnu Vaanguna"	Anuradha Sriram, Tippu	Victor Dass
"Romba Azhagu"	Karthik, Anuradha Sriram	Kabilan
"Tharuviya Tharamatiya"	Sarath Kumar, Josh	Kabilan
"Voochi Voochi"	Shankar Mahadevan	Kalaikumar

== Critical reception ==
Sify wrote, "For those seeking masala entertainment, Chanakya is worth the price of ticket money". Lajjavathi of Kalki praised Vadivelu's humour, Subha's dialogues but panned Srikanth Deva's background score and concluded saying Sarathkumar needs to have a Chanakya-like mind in choosing stories. S. R. Ashok Kumar of The Hindu appreciated the cast performances (especially Sarathkumar), Vadivelu's comedy and Madhu Ambat's cinematography but criticised the music and felt the fight sequences were routine.

== Controversy ==
Jananayaka Munnetra Kazhagam, a political party filed a case against the filmmakers for portraying their party flag in negative light in the film.
