= Idichapuli Selvaraj =

Indian actor (1939–2012)

- Born: Selvaraj; 18 July 1939; Komarapalayam, Tamilnadu, India
- Died: 30 January 2012 (aged 72); Chennai, Tamilnadu India
- Occupation: Actor
- Years active: 1965–2009
- Spouse: Chellammal
- Children: 1

Idichapuli Selvaraj (c. 18 July 1939 – 30 January 2012) was a veteran Tamil comedy actor. He acted in more than five hundred films. He acted alongside many actors. He also worked as an assistant director for the M. G. Ramachandran films like Idhayakkani and Ulagam Sutrum Valiban.

His brother Pandu was also a comedy actor and artist.

== Filmography ==
This is a partial filmography. You can expand it.

=== 1960s ===
Idichapuli Selvaraj 1960s film credits
Year	Title	Role	Notes
1965	Aayirathil Oruvan		
1968	Oli Vilakku		

=== 1970s ===
Idichapuli Selvaraj 1970s film credits
Year	Title	Role	Notes
1972	Raman Thediya Seethai	Barber	
1972	Idhaya Veenai	Patient's brother	
1973	Pattikaattu Ponnaiya	Cyclist	
1974	Netru Indru Naalai	Slum dweller	
1974	Sirithu Vazha Vendum	Rowdy	
1975	Ninaithadhai Mudippavan	Postman	
1975	Pallandu Vazhga	Veerappan	
1976	Uzhaikkum Karangal	Fake saint	
1977	Indru Pol Endrum Vaazhga		
1979	Dharma Yuddham		

=== 1980s ===
Idichapuli Selvaraj 1980s film credits
Year	Title	Role	Notes
1980	Poottaatha Poottukkal		
1980	Anna Paravai		
1980	Vasantha Azhaippugal	Idichapuli	
1981	Rail Payanangalil		
1982	Thanikattu Raja		
1982	Moondru Mugam		
1982	Idhuthanda Sattam		
1983	Thai Veedu		
1983	Thangaikkor Geetham		
1983	Imaigal		
1984	Vetri		
1984	Naan Paadum Paadal		
1984	Komberi Mookan		
1984	Anbe Odi Vaa		
1985	Mannukketha Ponnu	Station master	
1985	Deivapiravi		
1985	Nalla Naal		
1985	Alai Osai		
1985	Navagraha Nayagi		
1985	Unakkaga Oru Roja		
1985	Oru Malarin Payanam		
1985	Naane Raja Naane Mandhiri		
1985	Neethiyin Marupakkam		
1986	Kanna Thorakkanum Saami		
1986	Enakku Nane Needipathi	Teacher	
1986	Enakku Nane Needipathi	Mudhi Azhagan	
1987	Anjatha Singam		
1987	Velaikkaran		
1987	Shankar Guru		
1987	Enga Chinna Rasa	Father	
1988	Therkathi Kallan		
1988	Manaivi Oru Mandhiri		
1988	Sathya		
1988	Thaimel Aanai		
1988	Idhu Namma Aalu		
1988	Puthiya Vaanam		
1989	Pudhiya Paadhai		
1989	En Arumai Manaivi		
1989	Samsara Sangeetham		
1989	Enne Petha Raasa		
1989	Rajadhi Raja		

=== 1990s ===
Idichapuli Selvaraj 1990s film credits
Year	Title	Role	Notes
1990	Manaivi Oru Manickam		
1990	Engitta Mothathay		
1990	Pondatti Thevai		
1990	Sirayil Sila Raagangal		
1990	Mallu Vetti Minor		
1991	Kaaval Nilayam		
1991	Vetri Padigal		
1991	Nattukku Oru Nallavan		
1992	Idhuthanda Sattam		
1992	Onna Irukka Kathukanum		
1992	Sugamana Sumaigal		
1992	David Uncle		
1992	Solaiyamma		
1992	Veluchami		
1992	Pangali		
1992	Pattathu Raani		
1992	Meera		
1993	Walter Vetrivel		
1993	Paarambariyam		
1993	Aranmanai Kaavalan		
1993	Parvathi Ennai Paradi		
1993	Poranthalum Ambalaiya Porakka Koodathu		
1993	Mutrugai		
1993	Porantha Veeda Puguntha Veeda		
1993	Rajadhi Raja Raja Kulothunga Raja Marthanda Raja Gambeera Kathavaraya Krishna Kamarajan		
1993	Purusha Lakshanam		
1994	Sakthivel		
1994	Pondattiye Deivam		
1994	Seevalaperi Pandi		
1994	Jai Hind		
1994	Thaai Manasu		
1994	Sindhu Nathi Poo		
1994	Vaanga Partner Vaanga		
1994	Nila		
1994	Mani Rathnam		
1994	Sevatha Ponnu		
1994	Periya Marudhu		
1994	Naan Petha Magane		
1995	Muthu Kulikka Vaarieyala		
1995	Mannukku Mariyadhai		
1995	Thai Thangai Paasam		
1995	Mannukku Mariyadhai		
1995	Chinna Vathiyar		
1995	Gandhi Pirantha Mann		
1995	Puthiya Aatchi		
1995	Valli Vara Pora		
1995	Karnaa		
1995	Muthu		
1995	Murai Mappillai		
1996	Coimbatore Mappillai		
1996	Aavathum Pennale Azhivathum Pennale		
1996	Vasantha Vaasal		
1996	Nattupura Pattu		
1996	Avathara Purushan		
1996	Meendum Savithri		
1996	Vishwanath		
1996	Pudhu Nilavu		
1996	Veettukulle Thiruvizha		
1996	Avvai Shanmughi		
1997	Thedinen Vanthathu		
1997	Thadayam		
1997	Pistha		
1997	Pasamulla Pandiyare		
1997	Ponnu Velayira Bhoomi		
1998	Kondattam		
1998	Aval Varuvala		
1998	Natpukkaga		
1998	Ini Ellam Sugame		
1998	Rathna		
1998	Santhosham		
1998	Pudhumai Pithan		
1999	Mannavaru Chinnavaru		
1999	Padayappa		
1999	Nesam Pudhusu		
1999	Paattali		
1999	Sundari Neeyum Sundaran Naanum		
1999	Kaama		
1999	Sivan		

=== 2000s ===
Idichapuli Selvaraj 2000s film credits
Year	Title	Role	Notes
2000	Budget Padmanabhan		
2001	Krishna Krishna		
2001	Sonnal Thaan Kaadhala		
2001	Viswanathan Ramamoorthy		
2002	Guruvamma		
2002	Five Star		
2003	Diwan		
2006	Varalaru		
2007	Ennai Paar Yogam Varum		
2009	Thottu Sellum Thendrale	Villager	

=== Dubbing artist ===
Idichapuli Selvaraj dubbing film credits
Year	Title	Role	Notes
1991	Shanti Enathu Shanti	Main villain's assistant	
