= Nesam Pudhusu =

1999 film by Karthikvel

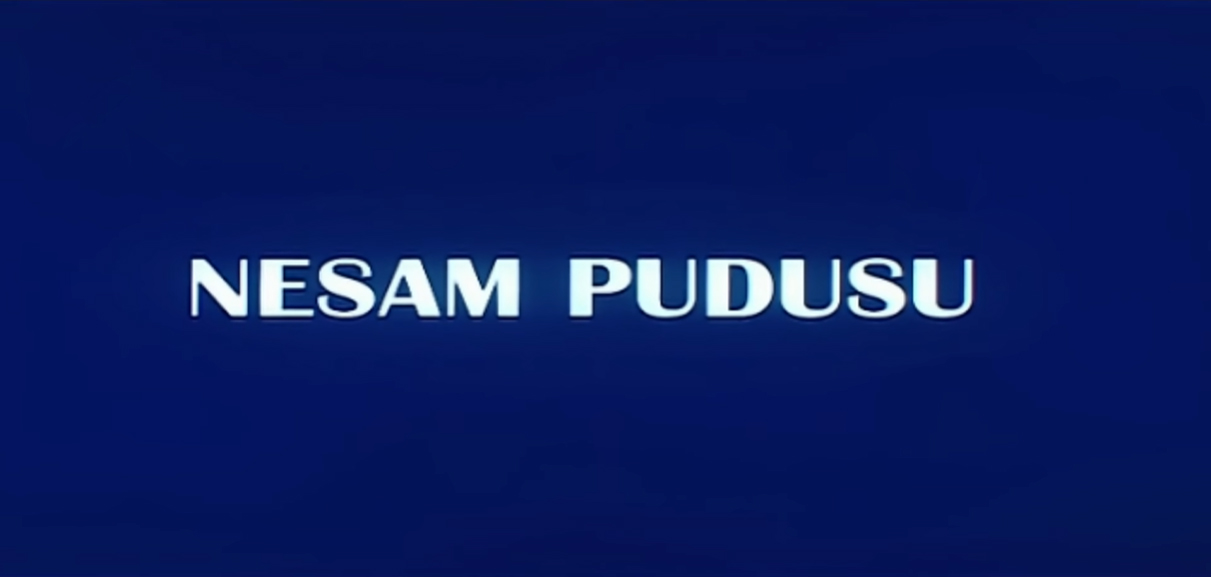
- Title card
- Directed by: Karthikvel
- Written by: N. Ramalingam
- Produced by: T. C. Pandian
- Starring: Ranjith; Priya Raman
- Cinematography: K. Nithya
- Edited by: M. N. Raja
- Music by: Bobby
- Production company: Sivasankaralaya
- Release date: 1 October 1999
- Country: India
- Language: Tamil

Nesam Pudhusu (/neɪsəm puðusu/ transl. New affection) is a 1999 Indian Tamil-language romantic drama film directed by Karthikvel. The film stars Ranjith and Priya Raman. It was released on 1 October 1999.

== Cast ==
- Ranjith as Ranjith
- Priya Raman as Vasanthi
- Senthil as Chithappu
- Vadivelu as Velu
- Sangili Murugan as Village President
- Ajay Rathnam as Vasanthi's cousin
- Sakthi Kumar as Suresh
- Bayilvan Ranganathan as Major Mayandi
- Kovai Sarala
- Gandhimathi
- Vaishali as Sumathi
- Premi as Social worker
- Kullamani
- Idichapuli Selvaraj
- Vellai Subbaiah as Iyer
- Thideer Kannaiah
- Mannangatti Subramaniam
- K. K. Soundar
- Bonda Mani
- Kovai Senthil
- Chelladurai

== Trivia ==
The lead pair of the film, Ranjith and Priya Raman, fell in love and got married during the making of the film.

== Soundtrack ==
The soundtrack was composed by Bobby.

Track listing
No.	Title	Singer(s)	Length
1.	"Meera Meera"	Hariharan
2.	"Poonguyilu Saththamthan"	S. Janaki
3.	"Kannorama Rosappoo"	P. Unnikrishnan
4.	"Orangattu Orangattu"	Mano
5.	"Oothikuda Machchan"	Vadivelu

== Release and reception ==
The film was released on 1 October 1999. K. N. Vijiyan of New Straits Times wrote "Nesam Pudusu is an unpretentious movie but directors Vel and Karthik manage to hold our interest". D. S. Ramanujam The Hindu wrote, "A SLIGHTLY different villagebased story where an young pair is forced to live as married couple following turn of events which generates interest right through in Sivasankaralaya’s “Nesam Puthusu”. The directors Vel-Karthik, who are making their debut, bring in the right changes with song and dances and comedy track." A critic for Dinakaran wrote, "Though it's a small budget film the story is an interesting thing that's treated in a spirited style. Directors Vel Karthik and producer Pandian deserve felicitation. A.Veerappan's comedy adds much to the film's success". Sify wrote "This good story line suffers from bad acting of Ranjith while Priya does justice to her role".
