= Vinodhini =

Indian film and Tamil television actress

- Born: Lakshmi K. R. India
- Other names: Vinothini, Vinodini, Shwetha, Baby Lakshmi
- Occupation: Actress
- Years active: 1982–Present

Vinodhini, also known as Swetha, (in Kannada films) is an Indian actress who appears in Tamil and Kannada films, and Tamil television shows. Beginning her acting career as a child artist, she went on to become one of the popular actress of 90's .apart from lead she also played supporting roles before acting in television series as well.

== Career ==
Vinodhini began her acting career as a child artist, appearing in films including Manal Kayiru, Puthiya Sagaptham and Mannukkul Vairam, before going on to enact lead roles in Tamil films. In 1992, she was directed by Balu Mahendra in Vanna Vanna Pookkal. Although the film was critically as well as commercially successful—it won the National Film Award for Best Feature Film in Tamil and completed a 100-days run in theatres—it failed to propel Vinodhini's career. That year, she debuted in Malayalam cinema with Soorya Manasam and the Kannada film industry with Chaitrada Premanjali, where she took on the stage name Shwetha. Both films were successes. After appearing in several Tamil films, including Balu Mahendra's Marupadiyum, Visu's Pattukottai Periyappa, Rama Narayanan's Vaanga Partner Vaanga, and two K. S. Ravikumar films, Suriyan Chandiran and Muthukulikka Vaariyala, most of them featuring her in secondary characters, she shifted her focus to Kannada films by the mid-1990s, where she continued to play lead roles. Her work in Tamil films in the late 90s was limited to minor supporting roles and guest appearances. Films in she made brief appearances include Praveen Gandhi's action film Ratchagan, Sundar C's comedy flick Unakkaga Ellam Unakkaga and N. Mathrubootham's Puthira Punithama.

Vinodhini soon started acting in television serials, such as the drama series Chithi, Agal Vilakku and Kannadi Kathavugal, and the comedy series Vidathu Sirippu by Crazy Mohan. Besides, she hosted a television show for eight years. She made a return to Tamil films with a supporting role as the female lead's (Meera Jasmine) sister in Kasthuri Maan in 2005. In its review, The Hindu stated that she gave a "very appealing performance" in the film. Since, she has appeared in minor roles in two Karu Pazhaniappan films.

== Filmography ==
| Year | Title | Role | Language | Notes |
|---|---|---|---|---|
| 1982 | Manal Kayiru | | Tamil | Credited as Baby Lakshmi |
| 1985 | Puthiya Sagaptham | Shanthi | Tamil | |
| 1986 | Mannukkul Vairam | Young Chinnathayee | Tamil | Credited as Baby Lakshmi |
| 1987 | Nayakan | Young Tara | Tamil | Credited as Baby Lakshmi |
| 1991 | Chithirai Pookkal | Bharathi | Tamil | |
| 1991 | Aatha Un Koyilile | Easwari | Tamil | |
| 1991 | En Aasai Rasathi | Rasathi | Tamil | |
| 1992 | Chaitrada Premanjali | Anju | Kannada | |
| 1992 | Vanna Vanna Pookkal | Manoranjitham | Tamil | |
| 1992 | Senbaga Thottam | | Tamil | |
| 1992 | Soorya Manasam | Susi | Malayalam | |
| 1992 | Abhirami | Maheshwari | Tamil | |
| 1992 | Annai Vayal | | Tamil | |
| 1992 | Kizhakku Veedhi | | Tamil | |
| 1992 | Chevalier Michael | Monu | Malayalam | |
| 1993 | Marupadiyum | Priya | Tamil | |
| 1993 | Suriyan Chandiran | | Tamil | |
| 1993 | Athma | Pathma | Tamil | |
| 1993 | Gejje Naada | | Kannada | |
| 1993 | Ponnu Chami | Maya | Malayalam | |
| 1994 | Vaanga Partner Vaanga | Vairam | Tamil | |
| 1994 | En Rajangam | Sugandhi | Tamil | |
| 1994 | Chinna Madam | Chithra | Tamil | |
| 1994 | Pattukottai Periyappa | | Tamil | |
| 1994 | Njan Kodiswaran | Maya | Malayalam | |
| 1995 | Kalyanam | | Tamil | |
| 1995 | Ilavarasi | | Tamil | Special appearance |
| 1995 | Muthukulikka Vaariyala | | Tamil | |
| 1995 | Thondan | Selvi | Tamil | |
| 1996 | Veettukulle Thiruvizha | Krishnaveni | Tamil | |
| 1996 | Azhakiya Ravanan | | Malayalam | |
| 1996 | Hettavaru | Seetha | Kannada | |
| 1996 | Karpoorada Gombe | Yashodha | Kannada | |
| 1996 | Minugu Thare | | Kannada | |
| 1996 | Muddina Aliya | | Kannada | |
| 1997 | Nodu Baa Nammoora | | Kannada | |
| 1997 | Mavana Magalu | | Kannada | |
| 1997 | Baduku Jataka Bandi | Mala | Kannada | |
| 1997 | Lakshmi Mahalakshmi | Anitha | Kannada | |
| 1997 | Ratchagan | Priya | Tamil | |
| 1997 | Thadayam | Jyothi | Tamil | |
| 1998 | Agni Sakshi | | Kannada | |
| 1999 | Unakkaga Ellam Unakkaga | Lakshmi | Tamil | |
| 2000 | Puthira Punithama | | Tamil | |
| 2001 | Kotigobba | Lakshmi | Kannada | |
| 2001 | Namma Samsara Ananda Sagara | | Kannada | |
| 2004 | Kutumba | Megha | Kannada | |
| 2005 | Kasthuri Maan | Prema | Tamil | |
| 2008 | Pirivom Santhippom | Visalakshi's neighbor | Tamil | |
| 2011 | Sadhurangam | Sandhya's Sister in law | Tamil | |
| 2017 | Konjam Konjam | Kodumudi Babu's Wife | Tamil | |
| 2021 | Calls | Shailaja Deputy Director | Tamil | |
| 2025 | Vattakhanal | | Tamil | |
| 2026 | Chowkidar | Sudha | Kannada | |

=== Television ===
| Year | Title | Role | Network |
|---|---|---|---|
| | Udal Porul Anandhi | | Doordarshan |
| | Kannadi Kadhavugal | | Doordarshan |
| | Virodhi | | |
| | Penn Bommaigal | | |
| | Sukhavasam | | Malayalam serial |
| | Vaa Vathiyare Vaa | | Polimer TV |
| 1996 | Chinna Chinna Aasai-Ganga | Manju | Sun TV |
| 2000–2001 | Chithi | Charulatha | Sun TV |
| 2000–2001 | Kudumbam | | Sun TV |
| 2000–2001 | Anandha Bhavan | Durga | Sun TV |
| 2002–2003 | Agal Vilakkugal | | Sun TV |
| 2003–2004 | Vidathu Sirippu | Janaki | Jaya TV |
| 2004–2006 | Sorgam | | Sun TV |
| 2005–2006 | Alli Raajiyam | Sonu | Sun TV |
| 2006 | Selvangal | | Sun TV |
| 2012–2013 | Siri Siri Crazy | Janaki | Kalaignar TV |
| 2016 | Vani Rani | Shanti | Sun TV |
| 2019 | Agni Natchathiram | Nalini | Sun TV |
| 2020 | Roja | Pachaikili / Thangapavanu | Sun TV |
| 2021 | Anbe Vaa | Vandhana | Sun TV |
| 2022–2023 | Kannana Kanne | Yamuna | Sun TV |
| 2022 | Maari | Janaki | Zee Tamil |
| 2023–2024 | Seetha Raman | Uma Maheswari | Zee Tamil |
| 2024–2025 | Lakshmi Nivasa | Lakshmi | Zee Kannada |
| 2026–Present | Siragugal | Chandra | Sun TV |
