= Vaideki Falls =

- Location: Near Coimbatore

Vaideki Falls is a waterfall situated in the outskirts of Coimbatore city about 35 km (22 mi) from Coimbatore.

The nearest village is Narasipuram. This waterfall used to be called "Tholayira Murthi Kandi", in Tamil Tholayiram stands for the number nine hundred, word Murthy has several interpretations, one is The Lord, another means Manifestation. Kandi is the word for (water)fall. The waterfall derives the present name after the Vijayakaanth movie Vaidhehi Kathirunthal by director R. Sundarrajan. The location is now a popular tourist spot in the City of Coimbatore. It is not well connected to transport facilities. Nowadays visitors are not allowed in order to protect wildlife which is abundant in that area.

== See also ==
- List of waterfalls
- List of waterfalls in India
