= Rajadhi Raja (1989 film) =

1989 film by R. Sundarrajan

- Theatrical release poster
- Directed by: R. Sundarrajan
- Screenplay by: Panchu Arunachalam
- Story by: R. Sundarrajan
- Produced by: R. D. Bhaskar
- Starring: Rajinikanth; Nadhiya; Radha
- Cinematography: Rajarajan
- Edited by: B. Lenin; V. T. Vijayan
- Music by: Ilaiyaraaja
- Production company: Pavalar Creations
- Release date: 4 March 1989
- Country: India
- Language: Tamil

Rajadhi Raja (transl. King of Kings) is a 1989 Indian Tamil-language action comedy film directed by R. Sundarrajan. The film stars Rajinikanth in a dual role, with Nadhiya and Radha portraying his characters' love interests. It revolves around Raja, a rich estate owner's son who seeks to avenge his father's death. He is aided in his quest by Chinnarasu, a lookalike. Rajadhi Raja was released on 4 March 1989 and became a box office hit.

== Plot ==
A rich estate owner Vishwanathan is killed by his second wife Sarasu and her brother Aadimoolam for his property. The estate owner's son Rajashekar returns from the United States and learns of this. To bring the culprits to book, he makes his friend Sethupathi, a rickshaw puller, act as Raja. But soon, Aadimoolam learns of this, kills Sethu and frames Raja as the killer. Raja is sentenced to death. In between, Raja loves Senkamalam, sister of an employee in his estate.

In the same village where Raja lives, there exists his lookalike, Chinnaraasu, whose aim in life is to wed his sweetheart Lakshmi. Raja escapes from jail, meets Chinnaraasu and makes Chinnaraasu take his place in jail. After many twist and turns, Raja brings the culprits to book. At the end, Raja marries Senkamalam and Chinnarasu marries Lakshmi.

== Cast ==
- Rajinikanth as Rajashekar & Chinnarasu
- Radha as Sengamalam
- Nadhiya as Lakshmi
- Radha Ravi as Aadhimoolam
- Vinu Chakravarthy as Nallamuthu Gounder
- Janagaraj as Sethupathi
- Anandaraj as Kangeyan
- Vijayakumar as Vishwanathan
- Y. Vijaya as Sarasu
- Dubbing Janaki as Chinnarasu’s mother
- S. N. Vasanth as Kathavarayan
- G. Srinivasan as Advocate Chidambaram
- Pradeep Shakthi as Valparai Varathan
- Idichapuli Selvaraj as Hotel servant
- Balu Anand as Lorry Driver

== Production ==
=== Development ===
R. Sundarrajan initially planned to direct Amman Kovil Kizhakale with Rajinikanth which did not happen. When Sundarrajan met Panchu Arunachalam who was finding plot for a new project with collaboration of S. P. Muthuraman and Rajinikanth, he narrated the plotline of Rajadhi Raja which impressed both Rajinikanth and Arunachalam. Rajinikanth insisted Sundarrajan to direct the film who relented after initial rejections to direct the film. The film was produced under Ilaiyaraaja's brother R. D. Bhaskar under their home banner Pavalar Creations. Cinematography was handled by Rajarajan, and editing by B. Lenin and V. T. Vijayan.

=== Casting ===
Initially, Revathi and Rupini were reported to be the two lead actresses. Due to date clashes, Revathi's role was given to Radha and Rupini's role to Nadhiya. This was the last film for Radha to act with Rajinikanth and it was the only film for Nadhiya with Rajinikanth. Radha Ravi, who portrayed one of the antagonists, initially "approached the role like a serious villain". However, when he was told that his character knows Rajinikanth's real identity, "I decided to play the character like a muff, and when I suggested the idea to director Sundarrajan, he accepted it". Ravi also intentionally mimicked his father M. R. Radha's voice and took inspiration from his father's character from the 1961 film Paava Mannippu.

=== Filming ===
The song "Vaa Vaa" was initially planned to be shot in Ooty but due to heavy rainfall, the crew decided to shoot the song in Coonoor and again went back to Ooty when it was not raining and completed the remaining shoot. Radha Ravi said Rajinikanth wanted this scene where there will be a snake in the hand, Sundarrajan objected as he felt it was "over the top" but Rajinikanth insisted on this scene because "he liked to have a snake scene in his films for sentimental reasons". The filming was completed in 50 days.

== Soundtrack ==
Rajadhi Raja

Soundtrack album by Ilaiyaraaja
- Released: 1989
- Genre: Feature film soundtrack
- Length: 30:04
- Language: Tamil
- Labels: IMM; Pyramid Music

Ilaiyaraaja chronology
Varusham 16 (1989)	Rajadhi Raja (1989)	Siva (1989)
External audio
- Rajadhi Raja – Jukebox on YouTube

The music was composed by Ilaiyaraaja. The song "Malayala Karaiyoram" is set to the Carnatic raga Sankarabharanam, "Meenamma Meenamma" is set to Sarasangi, and "Un Nenja Thottu Sollu". The soundtrack became hugely popular and was reportedly sold around 22000 units.

Track listing
No.	Title	Lyrics	Singer(s)	Length
1.	"Meenamma Meenamma"	Piraisoodan	Mano, K. S. Chitra	04:38
2.	"Maama Un Ponna Kodu"	Gangai Amaran	S. P. Balasubrahmanyam	04:25
3.	"Malayala Karaiyoram"	Vaali	Mano	04:42
4.	"Enkitta Mothathe"	Ponnadiyan	Mano, K. S. Chitra	04:51
5.	"Un Nenja Thottu Sollu" (album only)	Gangai Amaran	P. Susheela, K. S. Chitra	04:38
6.	"Vaa Vaa Manjal Malare"	Ilaiyaraaja	Mano, S. P. Sailaja	04:34
7.	"Ulaga Vaazhkkaiye"	Ilaiyaraaja	S. P. Balasubrahmanyam	00:58
8.	"Adi Aathu Kulla Aathimaram"	Ilaiyaraaja	S. P. Balasubrahmanyam	01:18
Total length:				30:04

== Release and reception ==
Rajadhi Raja was released on 4 March 1989. Ananda Vikatan rated the film 43 out of 100. N. Krishnaswamy of The Indian Express appreciated Ilaiyaraaja's music, Arunachalam's writing and Rajinikanth's dual role performance, adding, "the film is entertaining despite the abundant cliches and to-the-hilt commercialism".

== Legacy ==
The song "Enkitta Mothathe" inspired the title of two unrelated films: one in 1990 also directed by Sundarrajan, and another in 2017.

== Bibliography ==
- Sundararaman (2007) [2005]. Raga Chintamani: A Guide to Carnatic Ragas Through Tamil Film Music (2nd ed.). Pichhamal Chintamani. OCLC 295034757.
