= Udan Pirappu =

- Theatrical release poster
- Directed by: P. Vasu
- Written by: P. Vasu
- Produced by: M. Ramanathan
- Starring: Sathyaraj; Rahman; Sukanya; Kasthuri
- Cinematography: Jayanan Vincent
- Edited by: P. Mohanraj
- Music by: Ilaiyaraaja
- Production company: Raj Films International
- Release date: 15 August 1993
- Running time: 150 minutes
- Country: India
- Language: Tamil

Udan Pirappu (transl. Sibling) is a 1993 Indian Tamil-language action drama film directed by P. Vasu. The film stars Sathyaraj, Rahman, Sukanya and Kasthuri, while Thilakan, Nassar, K. R. Vijaya, Radha Ravi, Goundamani, and Mohan Raj appear in supporting roles. It was released on 15 August 1993.

== Plot ==
Sathya and Vijay are orphans and best friends. Since his younger years, Sathya worked hard to educate Vijay. Vijay, a young graduate, works as a driving instructor until he finds a proper job. Sumathi falls in love with Vijay. Bhavani, a childish woman, does not get married because she is cursed; all of her fiancés died before the marriage. Ameer Bhai and Sumathi's father Marthandan are friends and business partners. Ameer Bhai is involved in land grabbing and tries to sell Ganapathy Colony (wherein poor people, Sathya and Vijay live) to a gunrunner named Vadivel. Marthandan finally accepts for his daughter's marriage, but Vijay does not want to marry if Sathya stays single. Sathya gets married with Bhavani and Vijay with Sumathi. Marthandan knew that if Sathya and Vijay were together, he and Ameer Bhai cannot sell Ganapathi Colony. Even after the marriage, Vijay prefers to be with Sathya, so Sumathi becomes jealous of Sathya. Ameer Bhai, Marthandan, and Sumathi try to break their friendship in different ways.

== Cast ==
- Sathyaraj as Sathya
- Rahman as Vijay / Viji
- Sukanya as Bhavani
- Kasthuri as Sumathi
- Thilakan as Marthandan, Sumathi's father
- Nassar as Ameer Bhai
- K. R. Vijaya as Sumathi's aunt and Marthandan's sister
- Radha Ravi as Bhavani's father
- Goundamani as ‘White Rice’ Vellasamy
- Mohan Raj as Vadivelu
- R. S. Shivaji as Kondal Rao
- R. Sundarrajan as Beggar Union Leader
- Madhan Bob
- Ajay Rathnam
- Oru Viral Krishna Rao
- Pandu
- Mayilsamy
- Swaminathan
- Shanmugasundaram
- Joker Thulasi as Beggar
- Chelladurai as Colony resident
- Radhabhai
- Mohini in a special appearance
- Shenbagam in a special appearance

== Soundtrack ==
The soundtrack was composed by Ilaiyaraaja, with lyrics by Vaali. The song "Saami Varudhu" became popular and is regularly played during Ganesh Chaturthi.

Song	Singer(s)	Duration
"Ammamma"	K. S. Chithra, Mano	4:56
"Naan Piranthathu"	S. P. Balasubrahmanyam	5:08
"Nandri Sollave Unaku"	S. P. Balasubrahmanyam, Swarnalatha	5:00
"Puthusa Oru"	K. S. Chithra, Malaysia Vasudevan, Mano	5:03
"Samy Varuthu"	Mano, S. P. Balasubrahmanyam	5:08
"Solargula"	Ilaiyaraaja, S. P. Balasubrahmanyam	5:02

== Release and reception ==
Udan Pirappu was released on 15 August 1993. Malini Mannath of The Indian Express wrote Vasu "weaves into the script sentiment and melodrama in good measure and though he diverges from the main theme [..] he returns to the main theme [..] knowing where exactly the script value lies."
