= S. N. Vasanth =

Indian actor

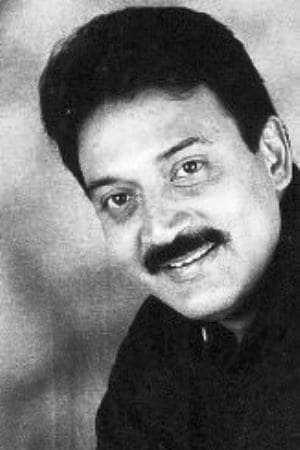
- Born: 1 January 1957
- Died: 14 May 2009 (aged 52)
- Other name: Mella Pesungal Vasanth
- Occupation: Actor
- Years active: 1983-2009

S. N. Vasanth was an Indian actor who acts mostly in Tamil films and soap operas. The actor was introduced into the Tamil film world by director Bharathi Vasu in the hit film Mella Pesungal. The title of the film became a prefix to his name and he was affectionately called as "Mella Pesungal Vasanth" in the Industry. Vasanth was the president of the 'Chinnathirai Nadigar Sangam' for a considerable period of time. S. N. Vasanth died from a heart attack in May 2009 He was a relative of actor Radha Ravi.

== Career ==
Studied at Adyar Film Institute. He made his debut as an actor in the year 1983 with the movie Mella Pesungal. He has acted in several films including Pulan Visaranai, Moondravadhu Kann, Pudhalvan. He has acted in DD Podhigai Doordarshan television and some private television serials. On 2 November 2003, he started the Chinnathirai Nadigar Sangam Association for the development of TV serial actors.

== Filmography ==
- All films are in Tamil, unless otherwise noted.

Film
Year	Title	Role	Notes
1983	Mella Pesungal		
1983	Thandikkappatta Nyayangal		
1984	Sanga Natham		
1984	Ithu Ilavenirkalam		
1985	Nermai		
1986	Palaivana Rojakkal		
1987	Neethikku Thandanai		
1987	Krishnan Vandhaan		
1987	Theertha Karaiyinile		
1987	Kudumbam Oru Kovil		
1987	Aval Mella Sirithal		
1987	ivargal Indiyargal		
1988	Varasudochadu		Telugu film; Remake of Theertha Karaiyinile
1988	Kalicharan		
1988	Paadatha Thenikkal		
1989	Dravidan		
1989	Rajadhi Raja		
1989	Poruthathu Pothum		
1990	Pulan Visaranai		
1990	Avalkkoru Janmam Koodi		Malayalam; Dubbed in Tamil as Athiradi Abilasha
1991	Sami Potta Mudichu		
1992	Thalaivasal		
1992	Chinna Marumagal		
1992	Naalaya Seidhi		
1992	Samundi		
1993	Ezhai Jaathi		
1993	Moondravadhu Kann		
1993	Gokulam		
1993	Amaravathi		
1994	Veeramani		
1995	Mannai Thottu Kumbidanum		
1997	Pudhalvan		
1997	Surya Vamsam	Chandran	
2000	Kadhal Rojavae		
2009	Yavarum Nalam		

== Television ==
Year	Title	Channel
1997	Mangai	Sun TV
1998	Akshaya	Sun TV
1999	Kudumbam	Sun TV
2000	Pushpanjali	Sun TV
2000	Nimmathi Ungal Choice V - Manasatchi	Sun TV
2000	Anbu Manam	Sun TV
2000	Amma	Sun TV
2003	Avalum Penthane	Sun TV
2007	Naanayam	Sun TV
2008	Avalukendru Oru Manam	Zee Tamil
	Muthal Manaivi - (Short Film)	
