= Puthira Punithama =

- Directed by: Mathrubootham
- Written by: Mathrubootham; A. R. Naavannan
- Starring: Mathrubootham; Nizhalgal Ravi; Vinodhini
- Cinematography: Balamurali
- Edited by: N. S. Natarajan
- Music by: Siddhartha
- Production company: Tamil Nadu Talkies
- Release date: 28 July 2000
- Country: India
- Language: Tamil

Puthira Punithama is a 2000 Indian Tamil-language erotic drama film written and directed by Mathrubootham. The film stars Mathrubootham himself in the lead role, alongside Nizhalgal Ravi and Vinodhini. It was released on 28 July 2000.

== Cast ==
- Mathrubootham as himself
- Nizhalgal Ravi
- Vinodhini
- S. S. Chandran
- Delhi Ganesh
- S. R. Vathsala
- Pratap Chandran
- C. R. Saraswathi
- P. R. Varalakshmi
- Usha Rani
- J. Lalita
- K. S. Jayalakshmi

== Production ==
In July 1999, Chennai-based sexologist Mathrubootham, who worked on popular television show, announced plans to make an educative Tamil film titled Puthira Punithama. He cast himself in the lead role, while an ensemble cast led by Nizhalgal Ravi, Vinodhini, S. S. Chandran, Delhi Ganesh and C. R. Saraswathi were also a part of the film. Mathrubootham wrote the film alongside A. R. Naavannan. The film was briefly titled as Idhu Puthira Punithama. The shoot of the film took place in Courtallam and Ambasamudram in Tamil Nadu.

== Soundtrack ==
Mathrubootham wrote two songs for the film's soundtrack. The recording of these songs took place in July 1999, with Jayachandran, Swarnalatha and Anuradha Sriram working as playback singers.

== Release and reception ==
The film was released on 28 July 2000 across Tamil Nadu, with a final change of title to Thambathyam Puthira Punithama, though it was better known by the shorter version of Puthira Punithama. Malini of ChennaiOnline noted, "when Dr. Mathrubootham ventures into feature film making, he is clearly a fish out of water". She added "the film seems an extension of his TV programmes, with nothing new for one to learn" and "with all those Indian film clichés like songs and dances packed in, one can hardly take it seriously". Malini concluded "he should have stuck to counselling and left film making to people who know the craft". The film performed poorly at the box office, and was taken out of theatres soon after its release.
