= Varasudochadu =

1988 film directed by A. Mohana Gandhi

- Theatrical release poster
- Directed by: A. Mohan Gandhi
- Screenplay by: A. Mohan Gandhi
- Story by: P. Kalaimani
- Based on: Theertha Karaiyinile
- Produced by: Sravanthi Ravi Kishore
- Starring: Venkatesh; Suhasini; Mohan Babu
- Cinematography: Hari Anumolu
- Edited by: Gautham Raju
- Music by: Ilaiyaraaja
- Production company: Sri Sravanthi Movies
- Release date: 3 October 1988
- Running time: 148 minutes
- Country: India
- Language: Telugu

Varasudochadu (transl. The heir has arrived) is a 1988 Indian Telugu-language drama film, produced by Sravanthi Ravi Kishore under the Sri Sravanthi Movies banner and directed by A. Mohan Gandhi. It stars Venkatesh, Suhasini and Mohan Babu, with music composed by Ilaiyaraaja. The film was recorded as a Hit at the box office. The film was a remake of Tamil film Theertha Karaiyinile.

== Plot ==
Bose an unemployed man, once met with an accident and was admitted to the hospital. There, he meets a TB patient, Raghu, who is going to die in few days; both of them become good friends. Raghu tells Bose regarding his past that he is the son of Dupathi Seshamma, a major landlord in a village. Raghu used to do a lot of mischief in his childhood; one day his friend Seenu died because of his mistake and he ran away from home. After listening to his story, Bose tells him to go back to his village, but since he will not live for many days, he sends Bose in his place.

Bose reaches the village as Raghu, everyone accepts him as Raghu expect Ammiraju and Subba Raju sons-in-law of Dupathi Seshamma, who are eagerly waiting for their mother-in-law's property. They try in many ways to eliminate Raghu / Bose but fail, finally, they want to make their daughters Bujji and Baby's marriage with him. Meanwhile, Raghu / Bose falls in love with a girl Annapurna, sister of Seenu, whom Raghu killed in childhood. In the beginning, she hates him but after knowing the truth, but she also loves him. Columbus, who knows the entire story regarding Bose and Raghu comes to the village and starts blackmailing Raghu / Bose. At the same time, the original Raghu also enters the village to spend his last days with his mother.

Meanwhile, Ammiraju and Subba Raju start torturing Annapurna, to remove her from Raghu / Bose's life. Simultaneously, Raghu is in his last minutes, even then he sends Bose to protect Annapurna. Seshamma listens to everything and learns who is her original son. Finally, Bose saves Annapurna, reveals the truth to everyone, Seshamma accepts Bose also as her son and Raghu dies, leaving his mother's responsibility to Bose.

== Cast ==
- Venkatesh as Bose / Raghu
- Suhasini as Annapurna
- Mohan Babu as Ambaji Rao
- Gollapudi Maruthi Rao as Ammiraju
- Kota Srinivasa Rao as Gandaiah
- Tanikella Bharani as Columbus
- Mallikarjuna Rao as Konda
- S. N. Vasanth as original Raghu
- Ramana Reddy as Lingam
- Chidatala Appa Rao
- Dham
- Rama Prabha as Raghu's first elder sister
- Sri Lakshmi as Raghu's second elder sister
- Malashri as Bujji
- Sandya as Baby
- Dubbing Janaki as Annapurna's mother
- Nirmalamma as Doopati Seshamma

== Production ==
Varasudochadu is a remake of the Tamil film Theertha Karaiyinile. The original lead actress was Radha; due to conflicting schedules, she was replaced by Suhasini.

== Soundtrack ==
Music was composed by Ilaiyaraaja.

Track listing
No.	Title	Lyrics	Singer(s)	Length
1.	"Nee Andam"	Veturi	S. P. Balasubrahmanyam, Chitra	4:40
2.	"Pachi Pala"	Vennelakanti	Chitra, S. P. Sailaja	4:42
3.	"Gujjina Gudi"	Veturi	S. P. Balasubrahmanyam, Chitra	4:35
4.	"Chempadebba"	Veturi	S. P. Balasubrahmanyam	4:34
5.	"Jamjanaku Jhanaku"	Sirivennela Sitarama Sastry	S. P. Balasubrahmanyam, P. Susheela	4:37
6.	"Eladri Venkanna"	Jaladhi	S. P. Balasubrahmanyam	4:43
Total length:				26.31
