= Joker Thulasi =

Indian actor (1950–2021)

- Born: Thulas; 15 March 1950; Chennai, Tamil Nadu, India
- Died: 10 May 2021 (aged 71); Chennai, Tamil Nadu, India
- Occupation: Actor
- Years active: 1976–2021
- Notable work: Maruthu Pandi; Udan Pirappu; Thamizhachi; Ilaignar Ani; Avathara Purushan
- Television: Kolangal; Vani Rani; Keladi Kanmani

''Joker'' Thulasi (15 March 1950 – 10 May 2021) was an Indian actor, who worked in Tamil film and television industry. Thulasi made his acting debut in the Tamil film Ungalil Oruthi directed by Devaraj-Mohan released on 11 April 1976, and was a veteran stage actor and film actor for decades. He appeared in some well-known films such as Thamizhachi, Ilaignar Ani, Udan Pirappu, Avathara Purushan, and Mannai Thottu Kumbidanum. His performances in many films were lauded especially in Thirumathi Palanisamy which was one of the best films of the year 1992.

== Early life ==
He was born in Chennai, Tamil Nadu. In his early years, he became a stage actor. He was the first actor in the Kanmani theatre troupe in Chennai. Since then, he made his film debut in the Ungalil Oruthi movie.

== Film career ==
Thulasi made his lead actor debut in the Tamil film “Maruthu Pandi” along with Ramki and Seetha, directed by Manoj Kumar.

== Television career ==
Thulasi had supporting roles in Tamil television serials, including such notable serials as:

- Kolangal
- Vani Rani
- Keladi Kanmani
- Megala
- Muthaaram
- Kasthuri
- Naanal
- Madhavi
- Azhagu
- Vannakkolangal (as File Pandi an in the episode File vangalayo file)

== Filmography ==
This is a partial filmography. You can expand it.

Year	Film	Role	Notes
1976	Ungalil Oruthi		
1976	Manmadha Leelai		
1982	Pattanathu Rajakkal		
1986	Thazhuvatha Kaigal		
1987	Idhu Oru Thodar Kathai		
1988	Oorai Therinjikitten	Lunatic person	
1989	Samsara Sangeetham		
1990	Namma Ooru Poovatha		
1990	Maruthu Pandi		
1990	Nangal Puthiyavargal		
1991	Chithirai Pookkal		
1991	Marikozhundhu		
1992	Thirumathi Palanisamy		
1992	Samundi		
1993	Maravan		
1993	Udan Pirappu	Beggar	
1993	Ulle Veliye		
1994	Ilaignar Ani		
1994	Sevatha Ponnu		
1995	Thamizhachi		
1995	Chinna Mani		
1995	Sindhu Bath		
1995	Neela Kuyil		
1995	Mannai Thottu Kumbidanum		
1996	Katta Panchayathu		
1996	Avathara Purushan		
1996	Vaazhga Jananayagam		
1996	Purushan Pondatti		
1997	Kaalamellam Kaathiruppen		
1997	Ratchagan		
1998	Moovendhar		
1998	Pudhumai Pithan		
1999	Adutha Kattam		
2000	Nee Enthan Vaanam		
2004	Aai		
