= Amman Kovil Kizhakale =

1986 film by R. Sundarrajan

- Film poster
- Directed by: R. Sundarrajan
- Written by: R. Sundarrajan
- Produced by: Peter Selvakumar; S. P. Pazhaniappan
- Starring: Vijayakanth; Radha
- Cinematography: Raja Rajan
- Edited by: Srinivas; B Krishnakumar
- Music by: Ilaiyaraaja
- Production company: V. N. S. Productions
- Release date: 24 April 1986
- Running time: 140 minutes
- Country: India
- Language: Tamil

Amman Kovil Kizhakale (transl. East side of Amman temple) is a 1986 Indian Tamil-language romantic drama film written and directed by R. Sundarrajan, starring Vijayakanth and Radha. It was released on 24 April 1986, and emerged a commercial success. Vijayakanth also won the Filmfare Award for Best Actor – Tamil. It was remade into Telugu as Khaidi No. 786 (1988) and Kannada as Nammoora Hammera (1990).

== Plot ==
Chinnamani lives in a village along with his adopted father, his sister, and his friends. He sings well and always performs during the village temple festivals. Kanmani is a wealthy girl and the only daughter of the arrogant village panchayat board president. She boasts of being rich and enters into clashes with Chinnamani. She decides to take revenge on Chinnamani as he does not respect her. Kanmani decides to learn music from Chinnamani, pretending to love him and making him fall into her trap.

Chinnamani, along with visitors, goes to Kanmani's house, but she embarrasses him in front of everyone. She also breaks his harmonium. In anger and retaliation, he breaks Kanmani's car and slaps her when she intervenes. Kanmani beats Chinnamani with a whip, as it was decided by the panchayat to punish Chinnamani. Angered, Chinnamani marries Kanmani by tying the nuptial chain around her neck immediately without her consent. Kanmani's mother Janaki later tells her the truth about Chinnamani.

Chinnamani is the son of Janaki's wealthy elder brother. Kanmani's father worked under Chinnamani's father, and Janaki loved him, but Kanmani's father usurps all of Chinnamani's father's properties after marrying Janaki and sends him out of town. He later meets his demise due to a disease. Kanmani's father tried to kill young Chinnamani, but Janaki rescues him and sends him out on a coracle, and later he gets adopted. She also reveals that Kanmani is the daughter of her father's illegitimate relationship with their housemaid, and Janaki raised her as her own daughter.

Hearing this, Kanmani realizes her mistake and decides to live together with Chinnamani, but he does not believe her. Kanmani mingles with the household and helps Chinnamani's sister regain her speech, winning everyone's hearts. While she sings, Chinnamani joins her, and she faints out of exhaustion, indicating his support for her.

Ravichandran decides to kill Chinnamani's brother-in-law and sends a few thugs. Chinnamani kills Ravichandran. Kanmani sends Chinnamani to move his sister to a safe place. As Chinamani moves, Kanmani accepts the murder and surrenders

Kanmani returns after a few years, where she finds Chinnamani as a mentally disturbed person searching for her, whom he believes has not been taken care of by him. Kanmani sings, rekindling Chimmanani's memories and uniting with him.

== Cast ==
- Vijayakanth as Chinnamani
- Radha as Kanmani
- Ravichandran as Kanmani's father
- Srividya as Janaki, Kanmani's mother
- Senthil as Kathavarayan
- Radha Ravi as Thondumutty, hired goon
- Vinu Chakravarthy as Chinnamani's father / Janaki's brother
- Ra. Sankaran
- T. K. S. Chandran
- Suryakanth
- Nalinikanth
- Vellai Subbaiah

== Production ==
Sundarrajan wrote the story of Amman Kovil Kizhakale with Rajinikanth in mind. However, following the release of Poovilangu (1984), he wanted to cast its lead actor Murali and Revathi, to no avail. After the success of Vaidehi Kathirunthal (1984), he finalised Vijayakanth and Radha. The title was derived from a song from Sakalakala Vallavan (1982). The filming began at Godavari river at Rajahmundry, Andhra Pradesh. Shooting took place in Kovur, Chennai. For the scene where Vijayakanth breaks Radha's car, Sundarrajan wanted a Maruti car to which the producer refused, leading to differences of opinions between them. Since Sundarrajan was persistent about the car, the producer finally bought the car and the scene was shot as per Sundarrajan's wish.

== Soundtrack ==
The music was composed by Ilaiyaraaja. All lyrics were written by Gangai Amaran. The song "Chinnamani Kuyile" is set to Keeravani raga, "Poova Eduthu" is set to Mayamalavagowla, "Kaalai Nera" is set to Abhogi, and "Un Paarvayil" is set to Hamir Kalyani.

Track listing
No.	Title	Singer(s)	Length
1.	"Chinnamani Kuyile"	S. P. Balasubrahmanyam	4:25
2.	"Kada Veedhi"	S. P. Balasubrahmanyam	4:13
3.	"Kalai Nera" (duet)	S. Janaki, S. P. Balasubrahmanyam	4:21
4.	"Kalai Nera" (male)	S. P. Balasubrahmanyam	4:22
5.	"Oru Moonu Mudichaaley"	Malaysia Vasudevan	4:34
6.	"Poove Eduthu"	P. Jayachandran, S. Janaki	4:32
7.	"Un Paarvayil" (duet)	K. J. Yesudas, K. S. Chithra	3:56
8.	"Un Paarvayil" (male)	K. J. Yesudas	4:05
Total length:			34:28

== Release and reception ==
Amman Kovil Kizhakale was released on 24 April 1986. Jayamanmadhan of Kalki opined that although the film was dragging frequently, it could be watched to know what happens in the plot. Balumani of Anna praised the acting, dialogues, music, humour and climax. Vijayakanth won the Filmfare Award for Best Actor – Tamil, the Cinema Express Award for Best Actor – Tamil, and the Pesum Padam Award for Best Actor.

== Bibliography ==
- Sundararaman (2007) [2005]. Raga Chintamani: A Guide to Carnatic Ragas Through Tamil Film Music (2nd ed.). Pichhamal Chintamani. OCLC 295034757.
