= Sami Potta Mudichu =

- Poster
- Directed by: R. Sundarrajan
- Written by: R. Sundarrajan
- Produced by: T. Siva
- Starring: Murali; Sindhu
- Cinematography: Rajarajan
- Edited by: G. Jayachandran
- Music by: Ilaiyaraaja
- Production company: Amma Creations
- Release date: 11 January 1991
- Country: India
- Language: Tamil

Sami Potta Mudichu (transl. The knot tied by a deity) is a 1991 Indian Tamil-language drama film, written and directed by R. Sundarrajan. The film stars Murali and Sindhu. It was released on 11 January 1991, and became a success.

== Plot ==
Kathirvelan's goal in life is to take revenge on his uncle, who had killed his grandfather. However, he has a change of heart after meeting his uncle's daughter, Neelaveni.

== Cast ==
- Murali as Kathirvelan
- Sindhu as Neelaveni
- R. Sundarrajan
- M. N. Nambiar
- Disco Shanti
- Thalapathi Dinesh
- Pandu
- Vinu Chakravarthy
- Vennira Aadai Moorthy
- GK as Nattamai
- Vijay Krishnaraj as Pannaiyar
- S. N. Vasanth as Pannaiyar's son
- Meera

== Soundtrack ==
Soundtrack was composed by Ilaiyaraaja. The songs "Neelaveni" and "Madhulankaniye" attained popularity.

Song title	Singers	Lyricist
"Ponneduthu"	Mano, K. S. Chithra	Gangai Amaran
"Kodaiyidi"	Mano, S. Janaki	Gangai Amaran
"Neelaveni"	Malaysia Vasudevan, K. S. Chithra, Sai Baba and Chorus	Gangai Amaran
"Madhulankaniye"	Ilaiyaraaja, S. Janaki	Gangai Amaran
"Mangalathu"	K. S. Chithra	Vaali
