= Akka Pettanam Chelleli Kapuram =

- Poster
- Directed by: Dasari Narayana Rao
- Written by: Kaasi Viswanath (dialogues)
- Screenplay by: Dasari Narayana Rao
- Story by: Agathiyan
- Based on: Pondatti Rajyam (Tamil)
- Produced by: Maganti Sudhakar
- Starring: Jayasudha; Rajendra Prasad; Aparna
- Cinematography: M. Narendra Kumar
- Edited by: B. Krishnam Raju
- Music by: Vasu Rao
- Production companies: Siva Shakthi Studios Pvt Ltd; Prabhu Films
- Release date: 22 October 1993
- Running time: 134 mins
- Country: India
- Language: Telugu

Akka Pettanam Chelleli Kapuram (transl. Elder Sister's Authority and Younger Sister's Family) is a 1993 Indian Telugu-language drama film, produced by Maganti Sudhakar under the Siva Shakthi Studios Pvt. Ltd. & Prabhu Films banner and directed by Dasari Narayana Rao. It stars Jayasudha, Rajendra Prasad, Aparna and music composed by Vasu Rao. The film was a remake of the Tamil movie Pondatti Rajyam (1992). The film did not fare well commercially.

== Cast ==
- Jayasudha as Ranganayaki
- Rajendra Prasad as Satyanarayana
- Aparna as Chinni
- Kota Srinivasa Rao as Brahmaji
- Suthi Velu
- Babu Mohan as Peon Satyam
- Vikram as Radha Krishna
- Srikanya as Sona
- Vallabhaneni Janardhan
- Ashok Kumar
- Ananth as Waiter
- Maganti Sudhakar
- Chandrika
- Rekha
- Radha Prashanti as Radha
- Jayalalithaa
- Y. Vijaya as Ammaji

== Production ==
This is the second film for Aparna after Sundarakanda (1992). After this film, she quit acting, got married and settled in America.

== Soundtrack ==
Akka Pettanam Chelleli Kapuram

Film score
- Released: 1993
- Genre: Soundtrack
- Length: 18:49
- Label: Supreme Music
- Producer: Vasu Rao

Music composed by Vasu Rao. Music released on Supreme Music Company.

No.	Title	Lyrics	Singer(s)	Length
1.	"Hey Krishna"	Jaladi	S. P. Balasubrahmanyam, Chitra	4:33
2.	"Chevilo Cheppalamma"	Bhuvana Chandra	S. P. Balasubrahmanyam, Vani Jayaram	4:28
3.	"Akhila Bharatha"	C. Narayana Reddy	S. P. Balasubrahmanyam	4:52
4.	"Meghamaa Choosipo"	Bhuvana Chandra	S. P. Balasubrahmanyam, Chitra	4:56
Total length:				18:49
