= Mannava (film) =

1997 Indian film by L. M. Balaji

- Poster
- Directed by: L. M. Balaji
- Written by: A. Jeeva Kumaran
- Produced by: Shanthi
- Starring: Prashanth; Sanghavi
- Cinematography: Imayavaramban
- Edited by: D. S. Maniam
- Music by: Deva
- Production company: Star Movies
- Release date: 21 February 1997
- Running time: 145 minutes
- Country: India
- Language: Tamil

Mannava is a 1997 Indian Tamil-language action comedy film directed by L. M. Balaji and produced by Shanthi. The film stars Prashanth and Sanghavi in the lead roles, while Deva composed the film's music.

== Plot ==
Eshwar is the son of R. Sundarrajan and Vadivukkarasi. He has a naturally helpful personality and will come to the rescue of anyone who is in difficulties. Eshwar's friend faces a problem marrying his fiancée. Eshwar helps his friend, which leads to a skirmish brawl, and Eshwar also falls in love with his friend's sister Kavitha. When Eshwar's love was accepted by both parents, they approach an astrologer, who predicts Eshwar to be isolated for some time to avoid disaster in his life. Eshwar arrives with his friend Mani to their estate in Coonoor – Ooty, where numerous incidents take place. At one point of time, Sinthamani, an intellectually disabled person, forcibly takes asylum in Eshwar's estate. A local thug Kabali tries to molest Sinthamani, and Eshwar chases Kabali away. Later, Kabali was found dead. Suriya, a police inspector, is deputed for investigating this case. Suriya is a relative of Kavitha, and they were supposed to marry. The investigation reveals evidence, and Eshwar is blamed for Kabali's murder. What happens next is to be watched.

== Cast ==
- Prashanth as Eshwar
- Sanghavi as Nandhini
- Goundamani as Raghupathy
- Urvashi as Sinthamani
- J. V. Somayajulu as Astrologist
- Devan as Suriya
- R. Sundarrajan as Eashwar's father
- Vadivukkarasi as Eashwar's mother
- Ponnambalam as Kabali
- Rajesh as Kavitha's father
- Ennatha Kannaiya
- Madhan Bob
- Pandu

== Soundtrack ==
The soundtrack was composed by Deva. Kumar Sanu made his Tamil debut with the song "Yamma Yamma" for this film.

Song	Singer(s)	Lyrics	Duration
"Indhu Maha Samudrame"	Hariharan, K. S. Chithra	Ponniyin Selvan	05:27
"Indhu Maha Samudrame"	Unni Krishnan, K. S. Chithra	Ponniyin Selvan	05:18
"Thelu Kadichiduchi"	S. P. Balasubrahmanyam, Swarnalatha	Vaali	04:46
"Nee Oru Romiyo"	S. P. Balasubrahmanyam, K. S. Chithra	Vaali	04:47
"Yamma Yamma"	Kumar Sanu	Vaali	04:41
"Gaana Porandhadhu"	S. P. Balasubrahmanyam	Vaali	03:55
"Pa Pa Chinna Pappa"	Hariharan, Swarnalatha	Palani Bharathi	05:36
"Un Manathai"	Hariharan	Palani Bharathi	00:50

== Reception ==
K. Vijiyan of New Straits Times called the film "above average, the kind you won't be tired of (except maybe during some of the songs)".
