= P. Pandu =

Indian actor (1947–2021)

- Born: P. Pandurangan; 19 February 1947; Komarapalayam, Tamil Nadu, India
- Died: 6 May 2021 (aged 74); Chennai, Tamil Nadu, India
- Education: National Institute of Design
- Occupation: Actor
- Years active: 1970-1981; 1988–2020
- Spouse: Kumudha
- Children: 3

P. Pandurangan, known as Pandu, (19 February 1947 – 6 May 2021) was an Indian Tamil actor and graphic designer who appeared in many comedy roles in Tamil cinema. He made his acting debut in the film Maanavan (1970).

A Doctor of Philosophy graduate in arts from France, he was also a visual artist who founded Capital Letters, a graphic designing company. He most notably designed the party symbol and logo of the All India Anna Dravida Munnetra Kazhagam. His brother Idichapuli Selvaraj had also previously appeared in films as a comedian.

== Career ==
He designed the two leaves party logo under the instruction and supervision of AIADMK founder leader MGR. In an interview with The Hindu newspaper in 2016, he said that he designed the AIADMK Flag within one hour at night, around 10:00 pm and also revealed that his association with late Indian veteran actor turned politician MGR began in 1973 when Pandu had designed stickers for MGR's iconic yesteryear evergreen film Ulagam Sutrum Valiban. Pandu made his acting debut in Maanavan. He played a supporting role in Agathiyan's Kadhal Kottai portraying Ramasamy who accompanies Ajith Kumar in Rajasthan. The performance as Ajith's sidekick was widely praised and established him as a prominent actor.

In 2013, he starred in Vellachi, which featured his son Pintu Pandu in the leading role. In 2019, he was bestowed with the Kalaimamani award for the year 2011.

Away from films, in 1975 he started a brass and aluminium business in Chennai called Prapanj Unlimited. He ran it as a family business, with son Prabhu Panju in charge. He also ran a company called Capital Letters and engaged in designing name boards for offices and residences of Tamil film fraternity. In 2014, he held an art exhibition alongside another son Panju Pandu.

== Death ==
He died on 6 May 2021 at the age of 74 after being hospitalized for COVID-19.

== Filmography ==
=== Tamil films ===
Year	Film	Role	Notes
1970	Maanavan	Student	
1973	Pattikaattu Ponnaiya	Cyclist	
1974	Sirithu Vazha Vendum	Cheater in gambling	
1981	Karaiyellam Shenbagapoo	Thangarasu	
1981	Kadal Meengal	Vadivelu's colleague	
1988	Raththa Dhanam		
1988	En Uyir Kannamma		
1988	En Thamizh En Makkal		
1989	Pillaikkaga	Police constable	
1990	Panakkaran	Ponnusamy	
1990	Kavalukku Kettikaran	Kannayya	
1990	Nalla Kaalam Porandaachu	Advocate	
1990	Paattukku Naan Adimai		
1990	Pattanathil Petti		
1990	Nadigan	Pandu	
1991	Sami Potta Mudichu		
1991	Chinna Thambi	Domestic help	
1991	Idhaya Vaasal		
1991	Thalattu Ketkuthamma		
1992	Rickshaw Mama		
1992	Idhu Namma Bhoomi		
1992	Pondatti Rajyam		
1992	Deiva Vaakku		
1992	Thirumathi Palanisamy	House Owner	
1992	Naalaiya Theerpu	Poramboku	
1992	Pudhu Varusham		
1993	Mutrugai	Pandurangam	
1993	Walter Vetrivel		
1993	Suriyan Chandiran		
1993	Madhumathi		
1993	Rajadhi Raja Raja ...		
1993	Purusha Lakshanam		
1994	Sindhu Nathi Poo		
1994	Ravanan		
1994	Aranmanai Kaavalan		
1994	Chinna Madam	Director	
1994	Nattamai	Nattamai's assistant	
1994	Murai Mappillai	College principal	
1995	Thamizhachi		
1995	Anbu Magan		
1995	Asuran		
1995	Mayabazar	Police officer	
1995	Muthu	Pallavarayan	
1995	Seethanam	Dr. Thandavarayan	
1995	Murai Mappillai	Hitler (College principal)	
1996	Vaanmathi	Krishna's father	
1996	Ullathai Allitha	Viswanathan's manager	
1996	Coimbatore Mappillai	Traffic Police Ponraj	
1996	Meendum Savithri	Gajendran	
1996	Vaazhga Jananayagam	Anjala's father	
1996	Irattai Roja		
1996	Krishna	Police constable	
1996	Kadhal Kottai	Ramasamy	
1996	Vetri Mugam		
1996	Enakkoru Magan Pirappan	Gopi	
1996	Andha Naal	Subbu	
1996	Gokulathil Seethai	Cook	
1996	Purushan Pondatti	Khan	
1996	Take It Easy Urvashi	Sub-inspector	
1997	Dharma Chakkaram	Chakkaravarthy's servant	
1997	Nesam		
1997	Gopura Deepam		
1997	Kaalamellam Kadhal Vaazhga	Sanjay Kujidabadham	
1997	Vaimaye Vellum		
1997	Mannava		
1997	Thaali Pudhusu		
1997	Ganga Gowri		
1997	Aahaa Enna Porutham	Panju Gounder	
1997	Vasuki	Police officer	
1997	Pudhalvan		
1998	Kaadhale Nimmadhi		
1998	Maru Malarchi	Azhagu	
1998	Color Kanavugal		
1998	Ini Ellam Sugame		
1998	Santhosham		
1998	Vettu Onnu Thundu Rendu		
1998	Unnudan	Venkatesh	
1998	Ponmaanai Thedi		
1998	Guru Paarvai	Vignesh	
1999	Ninaivirukkum Varai	Police inspector	
1999	Annan	Sangu	
1999	Vaalee	Velu Nair	
1999	Poomagal Oorvalam	Broker Ponnushamy	
1999	Annan Thangachi	Azhagu	
1999	Kannodu Kanbathellam	Akhila's boss	
1999	Independence Day		
1999	Jodi	House owner	
1999	Unakkaga Ellam Unakkaga	Doctor	
1999	Sundari Neeyum Sundaran Naanum	Chinnasamy	
1999	Time	Priya's father	
1999	Paattali	Lawyer Naachiyappan	
2000	Good Luck		
2000	Eazhaiyin Sirippil	P. Pandu	
2000	Thai Poranthachu		
2000	Kakkai Siraginilae	Pannaiyar	
2000	Sandhitha Velai		
2000	James Pandu	Police inspector	
2000	Unnai Kodu Ennai Tharuven	Selvam	
2000	Ennamma Kannu		
2000	Pennin Manathai Thottu	Police inspector	
2000	Sabhash	Marriage broker	
2000	Ennavalle	First House Owner	
2001	Looty	Subramanian	
2001	Engalukkum Kaalam Varum	Ramesh's friend	
2001	Rishi	Shopkeeper	
2001	Badri	Professor	
2001	Sigamani Ramamani	Police constable	
2001	Sonnal Thaan Kaadhala	Film Director	
2001	Kunguma Pottu Gounder	Sundaram Pillai	
2001	Citizen	Subramani's friend	
2001	Lovely	Paneerselvam's sidekick	
2001	Super Kudumbam	Major's secretary	
2001	Samudhiram	College Principal	
2001	Shahjahan	Lawyer	
2001	Manadhai Thirudivittai	Hostel Warden	
2001	Vadagupatti Maapillai	Dhadaji	
2002	Azhagi	Shanmugam's assistant	
2002	Pammal K. Sambandam		
2002	Dhaya	Police Inspector	
2002	Raajjiyam	Security Officer	
2002	Junior Senior		
2002	Varushamellam Vasantham		
2002	Unnai Ninaithu	Vaidyalingam's follower	
2002	Devan	Kaalimuthu	
2002	Thenkasi Pattanam	Kothandam	
2002	Youth		
2002	Sundhara Travels	Police Inspector	
2002	Namma Veetu Kalyanam		
2002	Game		
2002	Kadhal Azhivathillai	Professor	
2002	Villain	Police officer	
2002	Virumbugiren		
2003	Ramachandra	Rajagopal	
2003	Student Number 1	Sambasivam's sidekick	
2003	Jayam	College Principal	
2003	Aahaa Ethanai Azhagu		
2003	Vadakku Vaasal	Professor	
2003	Anjaneya	Police officer	
2003	Anbe Un Vasam	Professor	
2004	Jai		
2004	Gambeeram	Rajendran's assistant	
2004	Kadhal Dot Com		
2004	Ghilli	Police Inspector	
2004	Arivumani		
2004	Meesai Madhavan	Nair	
2005	Iyer IPS	Sub-Inspector Maduray	
2005	Kaatrullavarai	Ranga	
2005	Anbe Aaruyire	Police Inspector	
2005	Mazhai	Priest	
2005	Veeranna		
2005	Sorry Enaku Kalyanamayidichu	Narayanan	
2006	Vanjagan	Police constable	
2006	Varalaru	Shivshankar's assistant	
2006	Ganapathy Vanthachi	Vaithi	
2007	Pokkiri	Thillagara	
2007	18 Vayasu Puyale	Inspector Mustafa	
2007	Nam Naadu	political member	
2007	Puli Varudhu	Vinayaga's father	
2008	Pattaya Kelappu	Thangam	
2009	Villu	Jyothi's father	
2009	Kudiyarasu	Saamy	
2009	Brahmadeva	Doctor	
2009	Malai Malai		
2009	Kanden Kadhalai	Ramanathan	
2010	Rasikkum Seemane		
2010	Maanja Velu		
2010	Singam	Maarichaamy	
2010	Vaadaa	Vanangamudi's PA	
2010	Uthama Puthiran	Swamiji's assistant	
2010	Chikku Bukku	Sadhasivam	
2011	Thoonga Nagaram		
2011	En Ullam Unnai Theduthey		
2011	Vedi		
2011	Yuvan	Avudaiyappan	Bilingual film
2011	Marudhavelu	Sub-Inspector	
2011	Vazhividu Kanney Vazhividu		
2012	Vachathi		
2012	Maasi		
2012	Ullam		
2012	Yugam		
2013	Kaadhal Kilukiluppu		
2013	Vellachi		
2013	Ingu Kadhal Katrutharapadum		
2013	Thiru Pugazh		
2013	Bhuvanakadu	Police officer	
2014	Oru Kanniyum Moonu Kalavaanikalum		
2014	Aindhaam Thalaimurai Sidha Vaidhiya Sigamani		
2014	Theriyama Unnai Kadhalichitten		
2014	Sigaram Thodu	IBIBI Bank Branch Manager	
2014	Thalakonam	Tour guide	
2014	Jamaai		
2014	Manam Konda Kaadhal		
2014	Nenjirukkumvarai Ninaivirukkum		
2015	Katham Katham	Madhu's father	
2015	Kanchana 2	Dr. Pandurangan	
2015	Apoorva Mahaan		
2015	Nandhivaram		
2016	Vaaliba Raja	Traffic police officer	
2016	Anbudan Anbarasi	Irandam Thiruvalluvar alias Bakkiyaraj	
2016	Narathan	Astrologer	
2016	Summave Aaduvom	Astrologer	
2016	Ilamai Oonjal		
2017	Motta Shiva Ketta Shiva	Doctor	
2017	Oru Mugathirai		
2017	Anbanavan Asaradhavan Adangadhavan	Doctor	
2017	Thiri		
2017	Namma Kadha		
2017	Ippadai Vellum		.
2018	Panjumittai		
2018	Kannakkol		
2018	Itly	Producer	
2020	Indha Nilai Maarum		
2024	Chittu 2020		Posthumous release
2025	Yaman Kattalai		Posthumous release

=== Other language films ===
Year	Film	Role	Language	Notes
2002	H2O	Chennoor villager	Kannada	Bilingual film
2004	Cheppave Chirugali	Gopi's follower	Telugu	
2006	Manasu Palike Mouna Raagam		Telugu	Dubbed in Tamil as Yen Indha Mounam
2011	Keratam	Bikshapati	Telugu	Bilingual film

=== Television ===
- 2007: Dhinam Dhinam Deepavali
- 2014: Uravugal Sangamam
- 2015-2016: Sabitha Engira Sabapathi
- 2016: Valli - Natarajan

== Awards ==
- Kalaimamani Award - 2011
