= Kaalamellam Kaathiruppen =

- Theatrical release poster
- Directed by: R. Sundarrajan
- Written by: R. Sundarrajan
- Produced by: M. G. Sekar; S. Santhanam
- Starring: Vijay; Dimple
- Cinematography: Rajarajan
- Edited by: B. S. Vasu; Saleem
- Music by: Deva
- Production company: M. G. Pictures
- Release date: 14 January 1997
- Running time: 135 minutes
- Country: India
- Language: Tamil

Kaalamellam Kaathiruppen (transl. I will wait for eons) is 1997 Indian Tamil-language romantic drama film written and directed by R. Sundarrajan. The film stars Vijay and Dimple in the lead roles, while Sundarrajan, Jaishankar, Srividya, Karan, Manivannan play other pivotal roles. It was released on 14 January 1997, during Pongal alongside Nesam, Minsara Kanavu and Iruvar.

== Plot ==
In Coimbatore, Kannan, son of a retired commissioner, is excessively pampered by his mother, Lakshmi. His affluent upbringing has made him reckless with his spending. On his birthday, Kannan organizes a free trip for everyone, but Manimegalai declines, citing her preference for self-sufficiency. Their initial encounter turns slightly bitter. Kannan is tasked with organizing the college's silver jubilee function. Alongside his friend, he meets Govindan, a drama artist who suggests hosting a singing event. Kannan chances upon Manimegalai singing at a temple and is impressed. He invites her to perform at the college function, but she declines, citing Kannan's reputation for misbehavior towards women. Despite her initial refusal, Kannan attempts to persuade Manimegalai by offering incentives to the villagers, including sarees, silver pots, and groceries. He even goes so far as to lay a road in her locality and repair the plumbing issues. Kannan fights off her neighbor and sings to convince her, but his efforts are in vain.

Eventually, Kannan develops feelings for Manimegalai, but she harbors a dislike for him. Manimegalai's father visits Kannan's home, pleading with him to leave his daughter alone and Manimegalai files a complaint against him for eve-teasing. Kannan's father refuses to bail him out, reprimanding him for his actions. Enraged, Kannan attempts to forcibly marry Manimegalai, but the plan backfires miserably. Kannan's father confronts him, criticizing his irresponsible behavior and arrogance stemming from his wealth. Kannan's father asks Lakshmi to reveal a long-hidden truth. The temple priest informs Kannan that he is an adopted orphan. Upon the revelation, Lakshmi succumbs to the shock.

Manimegalai moves to Ooty, seeking a fresh start. She intelligently saves Raja, a businessman, from a critical accident and is appointed as his personal assistant. Kannan and Govindan follow her to Ooty, but this time, Kannan intends to apologize to Manimegalai. Kannan helps Raja secure his money-containing suitcase from thieves, impressing Raja, who appoints Kannan as his car driver. Unbeknownst to Kannan, Manimegalai is also working for Raja. Govindan finds a broker in Ooty and secures a house, coincidentally landing in the same colony where Manimegalai resides. Manimegalai attempts to drive Kannan away from Ooty by any means. To irritate Kannan, she pretends to be close to Raja, who mistakenly assumes she has feelings for him. She also falsely accuses Kannan of stealing cash from her table, which she had just placed inside the locker. Kannan is blamed and dismissed from his job.

Manimegalai, frustrated with Kannan's arrival attempts suicide, but her neighbors save her. Manimegalai's father visits her and shares news about Kannan's transformation. After Manimegalai left, Kannan's mother died, and his adopted father became paralyzed. Kannan, filled with remorse, cared for his ailing father, who eventually died, leaving Kannan his entire estate. Kannan donated his wealth to orphanages, undergoing a remarkable change. Manimegalai's father's words awaken feelings of guilt and regret within her. She recalls refusing to sing for Kannan when he had asked her earlier. Raja reveals to Manimegalai that she had wrongly accused Kannan and informs her that he has rehired Kannan as the company bus conductor.

Manimegalai realizes her mistake, and her feelings for Kannan evolve into love. Manimegalai begins using the company bus to catch glimpses of Kannan and even surprises him on his birthday. As Kannan prepares to reciprocate Manimegalai's feelings, Raja kidnaps them both. However, in a surprising twist, Raja helps the couple reunite and reconcile, ultimately leaving them after offering his blessings.

== Cast ==
- Vijay as Kannan
- Dimple as Manimegalai
- Jaishankar as Kannan's adopted father
- Manivannan as a broker and guide
- Srividya as Lakshmi, Kannan's mother
- Delhi Ganesh as Manimegalai's father
- Karan as Raja
- Charle as Kannan's friend
- Thalapathi Dinesh as Manimegalai's neighbour in Coimbatore
- Dhanapal as Raja's relative
- Oru Viral Krishna Rao as Manimegalai's neighbour
- Kumarimuthu as Manimegalai's neighbour
- Joker Thulasi as Manimegalai's neighbour
- Vathiyar Raman as a house owner
- Kovai Babu as Kannan's friend (uncredited)
- R. Sundarrajan as Govinda (special appearance)

== Production ==
Murali was the original choice for the lead role before Vijay was cast.

== Soundtrack ==
All songs were composed by Deva and written by R. Sundarrajan himself. The audio rights were acquired by Pyramid Audio and Music Master Audio Video Private Limited.

S.No	Title	Singer(s)	Length
1	"Anjam Number"	Vijay	4:00
2	"Anjam Number 2"	S. P. Balasubrahmanyam	4:09
3	"Manimegalaiye Mani"	S. P. Balasubrahmanyam	5:01
4	"Nilladi Endradhu (Duet)"	K. S. Chithra, S. P. Balasubrahmanyam	5:15
5	"Nilladi Endradhu (Solo)"	K. S. Chithra	5:16
6	"Pachai Kodi"	S. P. Balasubrahmanyam	4:29
7	"Suthudhadi Bambarathai"	K. S. Chithra, S. P. Balasubrahmanyam	4:19
