= Moondravadhu Kann =

- Poster
- Directed by: Manivannan
- Written by: Manivannan
- Produced by: M. Rajarathinam
- Starring: Sarathkumar; Nizhalgal Ravi; Raja; Monisha
- Cinematography: S. Sankar
- Edited by: P. Venkateswara Rao
- Music by: Deva
- Production company: Gi. Di. En. Art Films
- Release date: 18 September 1993
- Running time: 140 minutes
- Country: India
- Language: Tamil

Moonravathu Kann (transl. Third Eye) is a 1993 Indian Tamil-language thriller film written and directed by Manivannan. The story is inspired by Alfred Hitchcock's Rear Window. The film stars R. Sarathkumar, Nizhalgal Ravi, Raja and Monisha, while Mansoor Ali Khan, Vinu Chakravarthy, Srividya, Yuvasri, and Ganeshkar play supporting roles. It had music by Deva, cinematography by S. Sankar, and editing by P. Venkateswara Rao. The film was released on 18 September 1993, and became a success.

== Plot ==
It is night time, and a young girl (Priya) gets a phone call from her lover, Sundar. She tries to escape from her bungalow, but is stopped by her father. Her parents, who disapprove of her love affair, lock her up in her bedroom, and make arrangements to get her married to a groom of their choice. That night, from her bedroom, Priya witnesses the murder of Shanthi by her husband Sabapathy in the opposite building. She takes photos of the murder, and Sabapathy notices this. Sabapathy sets up his wife's death is of natural causes, but his brother-in-law Gopi does not believe him based on prior information. Gopi files a complaint with the police.

Sabapathy starts to pressure Priya to give him the negative. Priya tried to convey this information to Sundar through an audio cassette, but fails. Priya tells her maid Sornakili about the murder, gives her the negatives, and asks her to develop and print the photos. Sabapathy follows Sornakili who gives the negative to a photo studio. Sabapathy tries to threaten/pay off Sornakili and later the photo studio owner. Neither agree and Sabapathy kills both.

Inspector Sarath investigates these two murders, and he finds out that Sabapathy is connected to the killings. Meanwhie, Priya cuts herself with a knife, forcing her parents to admit her to a hospital. She escapes from the hospital but Sabapathy chases her. After a long chase, when Sabapathy is about to kill Priya, Sarath appears and shoots Sabapathy dead.

== Cast ==
- Sarath Kumar as Inspector Sarath
- Nizhalgal Ravi as Sabapathy
- Raja as Sundar
- Monisha as Priya
- Mansoor Ali Khan as Subbarayan
- Vinu Chakravarthy as Shanmuganathan, Priya's father
- Srividya as Priya's mother
- Yuvasri as Shanthi
- Ganeshkar as Gopi
- Vasu as Thulukanam
- Pasi Sathya as Sornakili
- Sudhangan as Photographer
- Sundar C as Studio Assistant
- Veeraraghavan as Shanthi's father
- Sharmili as Sabapathy's mistress
- Vellai Subbaiah as Corporation Worker
- Karuppu Subbiah as Corporation Worker
- Sounder
- Thideer Kannaiah
- S. N. Vasanth as Groom (guest appearance)
- Silk Smitha (item number)

== Soundtrack ==
The soundtrack was composed by Deva, with lyrics written by Kalidasan.

Track listing
No.	Title	Singer(s)	Length
1.	"Malayalam Malayalam"	Malaysia Vasudevan, Sunanda	3:44
2.	"Suluru Santhaiyile"	Malaysia Vasudevan, Malgudi Subha	4:01
Total length:			7:45

== Reception ==
The film was reviewed by K. Vijiyan of New Straits Times in October 1993.
