= Mella Pesungal =

- Title card
- Directed by: Bharathi–Vasu
- Produced by: P. Jayaraj; S. P. Sigamani
- Starring: S. N. Vasanth; Bhanupriya
- Music by: Ilaiyaraaja
- Production company: Kanya Creations
- Release date: 24 June 1983
- Country: India
- Language: Tamil

Mella Pesungal (transl. Speak Quietly) is a 1983 Indian Tamil-language film, directed by the duo Bharathi–Vasu. The film stars S. N. Vasanth and Bhanupriya. It marked the debut of Vasanth and Bhanupriya in the film industry. The film was released on 24 June 1983.

== Plot ==
Prabhu, a young man, falls in love with Uma, a school teacher. Their love life runs into trouble due to an unpleasant incident that happened in Prabhu's house.

== Cast ==
- Vasanth as Prabhu
- Bhanupriya as Uma
- Y. G. Mahendran
- Vinu Chakravarthy
- Anuradha

== Production ==
The film was originally announced with Sivakumar and Saritha as leading pair. The song "Sevvanthi Pookalil" was shot in a house set costing ₹1 lakh (equivalent to ₹17 lakh or US$18,000 in 2023) at VGP Golden Beach.

== Soundtrack ==
The soundtrack was composed by Ilaiyaraaja.

Song	Singers	Lyrics
"Sevvanthi Pookalil"	Uma Ramanan, Deepan Chakravarthy	Pulamaipithan
"Kaadhal Saagadhu"	S. Janaki, Malaysia Vasudevan	Na. Kamarasan
"Kelayo Kathal"	Krishnachander	Vairamuthu
"Uyirey Uravil"	S. Janaki	Gangai Amaran

== Reception ==
Jayamanmadhan of Kalki praised the acting of Bhanupriya, Ilaiyaraaja's music and Sekar's cinematography but panned the climax. According to Bharathi–Vasu, the film failed due to poor publicity. After the film's release, Vasanth became popularly known as "Mella Pesungal Vasanth".
