= Thamizhachi =

- Directed by: S. Asokan
- Written by: S. Asokan
- Produced by: K. P. Shanmugam Sundaram
- Starring: Napoleon; Ranjitha
- Cinematography: K. C. Thivakar
- Edited by: B. Lenin; V. T. Vijayan
- Music by: Deva
- Production company: K. P. S. Films International
- Release date: 29 June 1995
- Running time: 140 minutes
- Country: India
- Language: Tamil

Thamizhachi or "Thamillhachchi" is a 1995 Indian Tamil-language film directed by S. Asokan. The film stars Napoleon and Ranjitha, with Revathi, Goundamani, Senthil, Vijayakumar, Mohan Natarajan and Srividya playing supporting roles. It was released on 29 June 1995, and failed at the box office.

== Plot ==
The reporter Revathi comes to a village in search of interesting true stories. She later learns that a woman called Thamizhselvi has not left her house for seven years. When Revathi meets her, Thamizhselvi reveals her sad past.

In the past, Rasayya was a short-tempered man and the son of the village chief Periyasamy Gounder while Undrayar Gounder was a heartless rich villager. Both often clashed and fought. Some contrived situations made the villagers believe that the innocent Rasayya was a womaniser. Thereafter, Rasayya fell in love with Thamizhselvi who was from the nearby village and they eventually got married. Thamizhselvi first thought that Rasayya was also a womaniser, so Rasayya proved her otherwise. One day, Undrayar Gounder tried to rape Thamizhselvi but she killed him. Rasayya surrendered for the murder and he was sentenced to the capital punishment.

The reporter promises to save Rasayya from the capital punishment. What transpires later forms the crux of the story.

== Cast ==
- Napoleon as Rasayya
- Ranjitha as Thamizhselvi
- Revathi as Revathi (guest appearance)
- Goundamani as Villangam
- Senthil
- Vijayakumar as Periyasamy Gounder
- Mohan Natarajan as Undrayar Gounder
- Srividya
- K. K. Soundar as Thamizh's father
- Suryakanth
- Pandu
- Kumarimuthu
- Karuppu Subbiah
- Vellai Subbaiah
- Halwa Vasu as Jambulingam
- Joker Thulasi
- Kovai Senthil
- Pasi Narayanan as Narayanan
- Nalinikanth
- Shanmugasundari
- Kallapart Natarajan
- Gowtham Sundararajan
- Ragasudha
- Kavithasri
- Raani
- Divyasri

== Soundtrack ==
The soundtrack was composed by Deva.

Song	Singer(s)	Lyrics	Duration
"Karagattam"	Sindhu, Mano	Vairamuthu	6:16
"Kokku Parakkuthadi"	S. P. Balasubrahmanyam, Swarnalatha	Vairamuthu	4:45
"Koocham Migundha Ponnu"	Sindhu	Vairamuthu	5:06
"Maariyamma"	Krishnaraj	'Karur' Subramani	3:07
"Manushan Naaku"	Shahul Hameed, Mano	Vairamuthu	4:45
"Vaaya Uyaramana Aalu"	Mano, S. Janaki	Vairamuthu	4:38
