= T. Siva =

Indian film producer and distributor

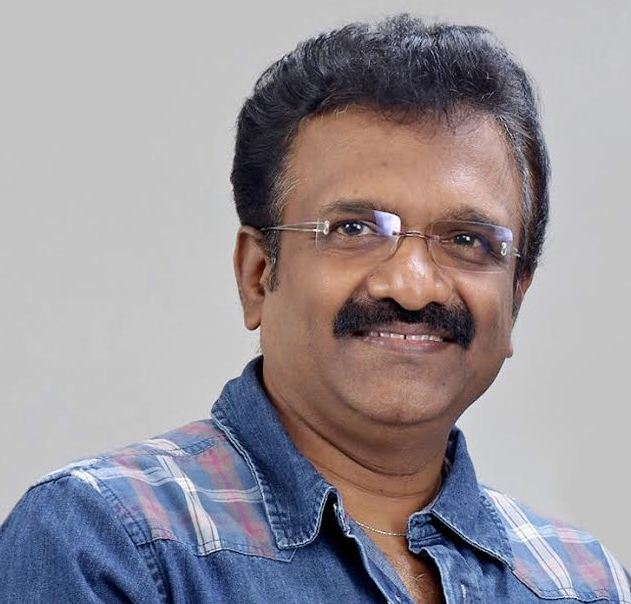
- T. Siva, 2016
- Occupations: Producer, actor
- Years active: 1987–present

T. Siva is an Indian film producer, distributor and actor based in Chennai, Tamil Nadu. He has produced 23 films including Saroja and Kanimozhi. Siva owns the production company, Amma Creations. He is best known for Deiva Vaakku, Aravindhan (in which he introduced Yuvan Shankar Raja), Saroja and Aravaan.

== Career ==
In the late 1990s, Siva faced economic problems following the release of Aravindhan (1997). In early 1999, he attempted to make a comeback though a film titled Conductor Mappillai starring Murali and Swathi but the film was shelved.

== Filmography ==
As producer

Year	Film title	Notes
1987	Solvathellam Unmai	
1988	Poonthotta Kaavalkaaran	
1989	Paattukku Oru Thalaivan	
1991	Sami Potta Mudichu	
1992	Deiva Vaakku	
1993	Chinna Mappillai	
1995	Nandhavana Theru	
1995	Raasaiyya	
1995	Seethanam	
1996	Manikkam	
1997	Aravindhan	
2008	Saroja	
2008	Vaazhthugal	
2009	Mariyadhai	
2010	Kanimozhi	
2012	Aravaan	
2016	Kadavul Irukaan Kumaru	
2017	Gemini Ganeshanum Suruli Raajanum	
2019	Charlie Chaplin 2	

As actor

Year	Film	Role	Notes
2008	Thoondil	Mac's assistant	
2008	Vaazhthugal	Doctor	
2014	Jeeva	Jenny's father	
2015	Paayum Puli	Road crossing guy	
2016	Kadavul Irukaan Kumaru	Kumar's father	
2016	Chennai 600028 II: Second Innings	Rajamanikkam	
2017	8 Thottakkal	Police Officer	
2017	Gemini Ganeshanum Suruli Raajanum	Gemini's Father	
2017	Aramm	Minister	
2017	Nenjil Thunivirundhal	Krishnamurthy	Simultaneously shot in Telugu
2019	Charlie Chaplin 2	Chidambaram	
2019	RK Nagar	Chairman Damodaran	
2020	Ka Pae Ranasingam	Registration officer	
2021	Kasada Tabara		Streaming release
2022	Laththi	Minister	
2023	Aneethi		
2023	Paramporul		
2024	The Greatest of All Time	Indian Embassy officer	
