= Deiva Vaakku =

- DVD cover
- Directed by: M. S. Madhu
- Screenplay by: M. S. Madhu
- Produced by: T. Siva
- Starring: Karthik; Revathi
- Cinematography: R. Ravi Shankar
- Edited by: G. Jayachandran; R. R. Ilavarasan
- Music by: Ilaiyaraaja
- Production company: Amma Creations
- Release date: 11 September 1992
- Running time: 130 minutes
- Country: India
- Language: Tamil

Deiva Vaakku (transl. God's promise) is a 1992 Indian Tamil-language drama film directed by M. S. Madhu and produced by T. Siva. The film stars Karthik and Revathi. It was released on 11 September 1992.

== Plot ==
Amsaveni channels the voice of the Goddess in childhood. After water is found miraculously after a drought through her, the grateful villagers treat her like the Goddess. Her duplicitous elder brother Vallathar exploits his younger sister's powers to enrich himself. When Amsaveni falls in love with a misunderstood drunk-with-heart-of-gold Thambidurai, Vallathar is unhappy. He does not wish Amsaveni to marry Thambidurai due to the difference in status between the two and, more importantly, because after Amsaveni's marriage the source of his income will stop. So, Vallathar tries to prevent Thambidurai from marrying his sister.

== Cast ==
- Karthik as Thambidurai
- Revathi as Amsaveni / Aatha
- Vijayakumar as Vallathar
- Srividya as Vallathar's wife
- Radha Ravi as Veeraiyan
- Vadivelu as Karuvadu
- Yuvasri as Thambidurai's mother
- Senthil
- Pandu
- Singamuthu
- A. K. Veerasamy as Priest
- Bhavana Samanthula as young Amsaveni
- Brinda
- Baby Sadhana
- Baby Sajana
- Krishnamoorthy

== Soundtrack ==
The soundtrack was composed by Ilaiyaraaja. The song "Indha Ammanukku Entha Ooru" is set to the raga Mohanam, "Oorellam Saamiyaga" is set to Natabhairavi. and "Valli Valli Ena" is set to Shivaranjani,

Song	Singer(s)	Lyrics	Duration
"Indha Ammanukku Entha Ooru"	Ilaiyaraaja	Vaali	4:53
"Katthuthadi Raakkozhi"	Ilaiyaraaja	Gangai Amaran	4:49
"Oorellam Saamiyaga"	Jayachandran, S. Janaki	Gangai Amaran	4:54
"Oru Paatale Solli"	S. P. Balasubrahmanyam	Vaali	4:58
"Valli Valli Enna"	Ilaiyaraaja, S. Janaki	Vaali	4:55

== Critical reception ==
Malini Mannath of The Indian Express wrote, "Here the storyline is thin, the script is not that engaging, but the effective camera work [..] A superb performance by petite Revathi [..] saves the film from being run-of-the-mill". K. N. Vijiyan of New Straits Times wrote, "This movie should be of special interest to those who frequently seek advice from temple mediums". C. R. K. of Kalki praised Revathi's performance, but felt the hard work of many actors was wasted due to the cliched characters and incidents and concluded whether or not actors are tired of portraying same kind of roles again, audience are tired of it.

== Bibliography ==
- Sundararaman (2007) [2005]. Raga Chintamani: A Guide to Carnatic Ragas Through Tamil Film Music (2nd ed.). Pichhamal Chintamani. OCLC 295034757.
