= Senthooram =

- Directed by: Sangaman
- Written by: Sangaman
- Produced by: R. P. Sundaralingam
- Starring: Moorthy; Devayani
- Cinematography: Ashok Dev
- Edited by: T. Thirunavukkarasu
- Music by: Ilaiyaraaja
- Production company: Sri Senthoor Films
- Release date: 11 September 1998
- Running time: 140 minutes
- Country: India
- Language: Tamil

Senthooram is a 1998 Indian Tamil-language drama film directed by Sangaman. The film stars newcomer Moorthy and Devayani, with Prakash Raj, Radhika, R. Sundarrajan, Vaiyapuri and Jeeva playing supporting roles. It was released on 11 September 1998.

== Plot ==
The story begins with Kattaalai (Moorthy) serving his sentence in jail and he remembers his past.

In the past, Kattaalai was a mentally ill man and he dreamed about getting married, but the villagers took advantage of his innocence. Muthu Manikkam (Prakash Raj) was a respected village chief married to Devaatha (Radhika) but they didn't have children.

Megala (Devayani), also known as Otta Rosa, was an innocent village girl who was rejected in her village, so she came to Muthu Manikkam's village. In the past, her mother was a stage dancer. When her mother fell ill, she had to become a stage dancer and she was one day raped by a rich landlord. Her mother later died.

Muthu Manikkam accommodated her in one of his houses and fed her. Soon, Muthu Manikkam had an eye on her. He went to her house the night whenever he wanted. The rumour abounded that Muthu Manikkam and Otta Rosa had an affair. Later, Kattaalai's wedding was cancelled when the bride's family came to know about his illness. So Otta Rosa decided to marry Kattaalai. The young couple lived happily but Muthu Manikkam became wicked towards them. Meanwhile, Devaatha became pregnant. What transpires later forms the crux of the story.

== Cast ==
- Dhakshnamoorthy as Kattaalai
- Devayani as Otta Rosa (Megala)
- Prakash Raj as Muthu Manikkam
- Radhika as Devaatha
- R. Sundarrajan as Sadayappan
- Vaiyapuri
- Jeeva as Vaidehi
- Anuja as Sivagami, Sadayappan's wife
- Thideer Kannaiah
- A. Pazhani
- Vetri
- Vellai Subbaiah
- Manager Cheena
- MLA Thangaraj
- Madurai Paneer
- Gemini Sridhar
- Vandikaran Prakash
- Amirthalingam
- Govindacharya
- Vijayamma
- Premi
- Vadhana
- R. K. Raani
- Subbulakshmi
- K. Meena

== Production ==
The film marked the directorial debut of Sangaman who earlier assisted Bharathiraja. Prakash Raj's role was initially offered to actor Manivannan, who turned down the film citing date issues. The film was initially shelved midway due to financial issues, but was later revived with the help of financier Dharamchand Lungat.

== Soundtrack ==
Th soundtrack was composed by Ilaiyaraaja.

Song	Singer(s)	Lyrics	Duration
"Naan Ippa Thaan Vayasukku"	Malaysia Vasudevan	Vaali	5:09
"Unakkoruthi Poranthiruppaal"	K. S. Chithra	Gangai Amaran	5:04
"Un Pakkathile"	Ilaiyaraaja, K. Mala	Pulamaipithan	5:22
"Aalamaram"	P. Unni Krishnan, Bhavatharini	Pulamaipithan	4:50
"Oru Vaaru Kashtappattu"	Ilaiyaraaja	Gangai Amaran	5:04
"Adi Unna Kaanaama"	Ilaiyaraaja, R. Sundarrajan	Vaali	4:49

== Reception ==
D. S. Ramanujam of The Hindu wrote, "The inexperience of director Sangaman (story, dialogue, and screenplay are also his) gives way to mistakes in the narration". He added, "Banking on a hero like newcomer Murthy to deliver Kamal Hassan's ``Chappani″ like role is another mistake. However, manfully Murthy tries to infuse life into the character, it falls flat because of improper guidance".
