= Theertha Karaiyinile =

1987 film by Manivannan

- Poster
- Directed by: Manivannan
- Screenplay by: Manivannan
- Story by: P. Kalaimani
- Produced by: Pala. Karuppiah
- Starring: Mohan; Rupini
- Cinematography: A. Sabapathy
- Edited by: B. Lenin; V. T. Vijayan
- Music by: Ilaiyaraaja
- Production company: Kamala Chithram
- Release date: 11 September 1987
- Country: India
- Language: Tamil

Theertha Karaiyinile (transl. By the banks of the sacred river) is a 1987 Indian Tamil-language drama film directed by Manivannan. The film stars Mohan and Rupini. It was released on 11 September 1987. The film was remade in Telugu as Varasudochadu (1988).

== Plot ==
Ganesan an unemployed man, once got involved in an accident and was admitted to the hospital. There, he meets a TB patient, Raghu, who is going to die in few days; both of them become good friends. Raghu tells Ganesan regarding his past that he is the son of his mother Chellathayee, a major landlord in a village. Raghu used to do a lot of mischief in his childhood; one day his friend Seenu died because of his mistake and he ran away from home. After listening to his story, Ganesan tells him to go back to his village, but since he will not live for many days, he sends Ganesan in his place.

Ganesan reaches the village as Raghu, everyone accepts him as Raghu expect two uncles, who are eagerly waiting for their mother-in-law's property. They try in many ways to eliminate Raghu / Ganesan but fail, finally, they want to make any one of their daughters marriage with him. Meanwhile, Raghu / Ganesan falls in love with a girl Pooncholai, sister of Seenu, whom Raghu killed in childhood. In the beginning, she hates him but after knowing the truth, she also starts love him. Arulvakku aiyasami, who knows the entire story regarding Ganesan and Raghu comes to the village and starts blackmailing Raghu / Ganesan. At the same time, the original Raghu also enters the village to spend his last days with his mother.

Meanwhile, those two uncles start torturing Pooncholai, to remove her from Raghu / Ganesan's life. Simultaneously, Raghu is in his last minutes, even then he sends Ganesan to protect Pooncholai. Mom chellathayi listens to everything and learns who is her original son. Finally, Ganesan saves Pooncholai, reveals the truth to everyone, Mom chellathayi accepts Ganesan also as her son and Raghu dies, leaving his mother's responsibility to Ganesan.

== Cast ==
- Mohan as Ganesan (Raja)
- Rupini as Poonjolai
- Senthil
- Janagaraj as Panchayat
- Vinu Chakravarthy as Sarasu's Husband
- Malaysia Vasudevan as Kova Sarala's husband
- Vennira Aadai Moorthy as 'Arul Vaakku' Ayyasamy
- S. N. Vasanth as Ganesan
- Thyagu as Village President
- Gandhimathi as Chellathayi
- Kovai Sarala as Sarasu's sister
- Vijaya Chandrika as Sarasu

== Production ==
During filming, Rupini, who is not a native Tamil speaker, had difficulties with the lengthy dialogues, but managed to Manivannan's satisfaction.

== Soundtrack ==
The music was composed by Ilaiyaraaja. The title song is set to the raga Shubhapantuvarali.

Song	Singers	Lyrics	Length
"Theerthakkarai" (Title Song)	Ilaiyaraaja	Gangai Amaran	02:04
"Ushaar"	Ilaiyaraaja, Gangai Amaran	Gangai Amaran	04:43
"Kotti Kidakkuthu"	K. S. Chithra	Ilaiyaraaja	04:36
"Asai Kiliyey Naan Solli"	Mano	Gangai Amaran	04:16
"Theerthakkarai"	S. P. Balasubrahmanyam	Gangai Amaran	04:18
"Vizhiyil Pudhu Kavithai"	Mano, K. S. Chithra	Gangai Amaran	04:19
"Theychu"	S. P. Sailaja	Gangai Amaran	04:34

== Release and reception ==
Theertha Karaiyinile was released on 11 September 1987. NKS of The Indian Express called the film "well told", and was particularly appreciative of Gandhimathi's performance. Jayamanmadhan of Kalki reviewed the film more negatively, saying the cinematography looked like that of an art film. Balumani of Anna praised acting, cinematography, music and direction.
