= Engitta Mothathay =

- Poster
- Directed by: R. Sundarrajan
- Screenplay by: R. Sundarrajan
- Story by: Panchu Arunachalam
- Produced by: Raajeshwari Sundarrajan
- Starring: Vijayakanth; Shobana; Khushbu
- Cinematography: Rajarajan
- Edited by: K. R. Ramalingam
- Music by: Ilaiyaraaja
- Production company: Raajeswari Productions
- Release date: 14 September 1990
- Running time: 138 minutes
- Country: India
- Language: Tamil

Engitta Mothathay (transl. Don't mess with me) is a 1990 Indian Tamil-language romantic action drama film, directed by R. Sundarrajan and produced by Raajeshwari Sundarrajan. The film stars Vijayakanth, Shobana and Khushbu. It was released on 14 September 1990, and failed at the box office. The film's title was derived from a song from Rajadhi Raja (1989) also directed by Sundarrajan.

== Plot ==
Saroja loves Pandian and wants to marry him. Meanwhile, Mallika, an arrogant wealthy girl, also falls in love with Pandian and plots to cause a rift between Saroja and him. Will Mallika be victorious in her attempt or not is what the story culminates into.

== Cast ==
- Vijayakanth as Pandiyan
- Shobana as Mallika
- Khushbu as Saroja
- Radha Ravi
- Nizhalgal Ravi
- Vadivukkarasi as Saroja's Mother
- Manorama as Valliamma
- Thyagu
- Vennira Aadai Moorthy
- Raja in a Guest Appearance
- Sarath Kumar as Military Kandhan (Guest Appearance)
- Idichapuli Selvaraj
- Kullamani
- Gundu Kalyanam
- Pasi Narayanan
- Balu Anand as Mutton shop owner

== Soundtrack ==
The music was composed by Ilaiyaraaja. The song "Sariyo Sariyo" was a reused version of "Puzhayorathil" from the 1989 Malayalam film Adharvam.

Track listing
No.	Title	Lyrics	Singer(s)	Length
1.	"Anju Paisa Pathu Paisa"	Vaali	Malaysia Vasudevan	4:34
2.	"Hey Maama"	Pulamaipithan	S. Janaki	4:24
3.	"Ivan Veeran Sooran"	Vaali	S. Janaki	4:35
4.	"Onnodu Rendunnu"	Vaali	Malaysia Vasudevan, S. Janaki	4:35
5.	"Sariyo Sariyo Naan"	Vaali	Malaysia Vasudevan, S. Janaki	4:38
6.	"Kai Veesamma Kai Veesu"	Vaali	K. S. Chithra	1:04
Total length:				23:50
