= Nammoora Hammera =

1990 film by Peraala

Nammoora Hammeera
- Directed by: Peraala
- Written by: Vijaya Bapineedu
- Based on: Amman Kovil Kizhakale (Tamil)
- Produced by: Bucchi Reddy
- Starring: Ambareesh; Suman Ranganathan; Devaraj
- Cinematography: Johnny Lal
- Edited by: Murali; Ramaiah
- Music by: Hamsalekha
- Production company: M. J. Art Pictures
- Release date: 24 January 1990
- Running time: 139 minutes
- Country: India
- Language: Kannada

Nammoora Hammeera is a 1990 Indian Kannada-language romantic drama film directed by Peraala and written by Vijaya Bapineedu. It is a remake of the 1986 Tamil movie Amman Kovil Kizhakale.

The film stars Ambareesh, Suman Ranganathan, Devaraj and Mukhyamantri Chandru. The film, produced by B. H. Bucchi Reddy, was widely appreciated for its songs tuned by Hamsalekha and lead actors performances upon release.

== Cast ==
- Ambareesh as Gopi
- Suman Ranganathan as Radha
- Devaraj as Attibele Anjani
- C. R. Simha as Pappanna
- Mukhyamantri Chandru as Bhujang Rao
- Umashree as Muthu
- Dinesh
- Disco Shanti
- Sathyajith
- Hemanth Kumar
- Sathyabhama as Bhama
- Kunigal Nagabhushan

== Soundtrack ==
The music of the film was composed and lyrics were written by Hamsalekha and the entire soundtrack was received extremely well. Audio was released on Lahari Music.

Track listing
No.	Title	Lyrics	Singer(s)	Length
1.	"Kogile O Kogile"	Hamsalekha	S. P. Balasubrahmanyam, Manjula Gururaj
2.	"Aaseyu Munde Munde"	Hamsalekha	Mano, Manjula Gururaj
3.	"Ammamma Gumma"	Hamsalekha	S. P. Balasubrahmanyam, Manjula Gururaj
4.	"Gaali Gaali Nammoora"	Hamsalekha	Ramesh
5.	"Kaveriya Dande"	Hamsalekha	Manjula Gururaj
