= Kunguma Chimil =

- VCD cover
- Directed by: R. Sundarrajan
- Written by: R. Sundarrajan
- Produced by: Durai; Rasappan; Srinivasan
- Starring: Mohan; Ilavarasi; Revathi; Chandrasekhar
- Cinematography: Rajarajan
- Edited by: B Krishnakumar; Srinivas
- Music by: Ilaiyaraaja
- Production company: Sunflower Creations
- Release date: 23 August 1985
- Country: India
- Language: Tamil

Kunguma Chimil (transl. Saffron Kit) is a 1985 Indian Tamil-language film written and directed by R. Sundarrajan. The film stars Mohan, Ilavarasi, Revathi and Chandrasekhar. It was released on 23 August 1985.

== Plot ==
Ravi and Philomena, two orphans from different backgrounds, meet on a bus journey to Chennai. Ravi, despite holding a diploma, struggles to find employment in the city and becomes a rickshaw driver, while Philomena, a Catholic nurse, flees from her foster father after discovering his involvement in fraudulent activities.

The two form a bond, but their lives take a difficult turn as they face homelessness, poverty, and a series of personal challenges. Philomena, feeling like a burden, leaves Ravi temporarily to give him a chance to improve his situation. Meanwhile, Ravi stumbles upon a large sum of money and uses it to secure a job as a forest supervisor, unaware that the money belongs to Manikkam, who lost it during a bus ride.

Manikkam's daughter Rukumani, who works for Ravi as a maid, develops feelings for him, but she is also pursued by Sekhar, a wealthy man who gives up everything to be with her. As tensions rise, Ravi discovers the truth about the money and feels guilty for inadvertently causing Rukumani and her father's misfortunes. He contemplates marrying Rukumani to make amends, but his heart remains on Philomena.

Rukumani chooses to marry Sekhar, and Ravi is reunited with Philomena, leading to a happy conclusion for both couples.

== Cast ==
- Mohan as Ravi
- Ilavarasi as Philomena "Philo"
- Revathi as Rukumani "Ruku"
- Chandrasekhar as Sekhar
- Delhi Ganesh as Manikkam
- V. Gopalakrishnan as David
- Senthil
- Loose Mohan as Ganesan
- Typist Gopu as Manager
- Pasi Narayanan as Narayanan
- Sivaraman
- Bayilvan Ranganathan

== Production ==
Santhosh Tea shop at Adyar, Chennai was featured in the film for a single shot.

== Soundtrack ==
The soundtrack was composed by Ilaiyaraaja. The song "Nilavu Thoongum" is set in the Carnatic raga Mohanam, "Goodsu Vandiyile" is set to Keeravani, and "Poongatre Thendathey" is set to Brindavani Sarang, a Hindustani raga.

Song	Singers	Lyrics	Length
"Poongatre Thendathey"	S. Janaki	Gangai Amaran	04:33
"Nilavu Thoongum Neram"	S. P. Balasubrahmanyam, S. Janaki	Vaali	02:08
"Nilavu Thoongum Neram"	S. Janaki	Vaali	04:34
"Goodsu Vandiyile"	Malaysia Vasudevan, S. Janaki	Vaali	04:23
"Kai Valikkuthu Kai Valikkuthu"	Malaysia Vasudevan, S. Janaki	Vaali	04:29
"Vaichalam Nethi Thankaiyalaey"	Malaysia Vasudevan, Vani Jairam	Vaali	04:22

== Critical reception ==
Jayamanmadhan of Kalki praised the film for its soundtrack and cinematography. Balumani of Anna praised the acting, music, cinematography and Sundarrajan's direction but panned him for ignoring continuity errors.

== Bibliography ==
- Sundararaman (2007) [2005]. Raga Chintamani: A Guide to Carnatic Ragas Through Tamil Film Music (2nd ed.). Pichhamal Chintamani. OCLC 295034757.
