= Vaanga Partner Vaanga =

- Poster
- Directed by: Rama Narayanan
- Written by: Rama Narayanan; Pugazhmani (dialogues)
- Produced by: Rama Narayanan
- Starring: Visu; Radha Ravi; S. S. Chandran; Vennira Aadai Moorthy
- Cinematography: Baby Philips
- Edited by: Baburaj
- Music by: Shankar–Ganesh
- Production company: Sri Thenandal Films
- Release date: 10 January 1994
- Running time: 125 minutes
- Country: India
- Language: Tamil

Vaanga Partner Vaanga (transl. Come Partner Come) is a 1994 Indian Tamil-language comedy film directed and produced by Rama Narayanan. The film stars Visu, Radha Ravi, S. S. Chandran and Vennira Aadai Moorthy. It was released on 14 January 1994.

== Plot ==
Ponnappan, Uzhagappan and Azhagappan are three naive villagers who come to Chennai for becoming wealthy. However, they are cheated by the townsfolk. They decide to join hands and they begin to look for an intelligent, bachelor and a good partner. The first one who comes to their mind is the lord Ganapathi. They then sign a contract with the lord (statue) : in five years time, Ganapathi will have the quarter of their benefit. The Gurukkal is the witness of this deal. To help them, Ganapathi himself appears as a human and he becomes their partner. Five years later, Ponnappan, Uzhagappan and Azhagappan become wealthy and arrogant men. One day, the Gurukkal asks them the quarter of their benefit as promised to build a temple but Ponnappan, Uzhagappan and Azhagappan refuse it categorically. Ganapathi is shocked for being betrayed and decides to teach them a lesson.

== Cast ==
- Visu as Ganapathi
- Radha Ravi as Ponnappan
- S. S. Chandran as Uzhagappan
- Vennira Aadai Moorthy as Azhagappan
- Vivek as Koteeswaran
- Chinni Jayanth
- Silk Smitha as Menaka
- Kovai Sarala as Pawn
- Vinodhini as Vairam
- Ra. Sankaran as Gurukkal
- Kumarimuthu as Sreenivasan
- Manisamy
- Karuppu Subbiah
- Thayir Vadai Desigan
- Idichapuli Selvaraj
- T. K. S. Natarajan
- Kullamani
- Marthandam
- Bayilvan Ranganathan
- Loose Mohan

== Soundtrack ==
The music was composed by Ganesh (of Shankar–Ganesh), with lyrics written by Vaali. Soundtrack was released under audio label Sree Devi Audio.

Song	Singer	Duration
"Thattanum Thattanum"	R. R. Rajini	3:15
"Paatirukkudhu"	Visu, Radha Ravi, Mano, Swarnalatha	4:05
"Vaanga Partner Vaanga"	Ganesh	4:12

== Reception ==
Malini Mannath of The Indian Express gave the film a negative review and said, "it becomes a severe test of your patience especially if the script is mediocre and insipid". K. Vijiyan of New Straits Times gave a more positive review, praising the film's comedy. R. P. R. of Kalki said Rama Narayanan, moving away from elements Amman, Shamili, monkey, elephant and collaborating with Visu, had tried to provide laughter but the film looks similar to the appearance of the last period of ADMK-Congress alliance and concluded that someone said that this was completed the film in sixteen days; the rush seemed evident inch by inch.
