= Thirumathi Palanisamy =

1992 Tamil comedy-drama film

- Poster
- Directed by: R. Sundarrajan
- Written by: R. Sundarrajan
- Produced by: Ramanathan
- Starring: Sathyaraj; Sukanya
- Cinematography: Rajarajan
- Edited by: P. Mohanraj
- Music by: Ilaiyaraaja
- Production company: Raaj Films International
- Release date: 25 October 1992
- Running time: 140 minutes
- Country: India
- Language: Tamil

Thirumathi Palanisamy (transl. Mrs. Palanisamy) is a 1992 Indian Tamil-language drama film written and directed by R. Sundarrajan. The film stars Sathyaraj and Sukanya. It was released on 25 October 1992.

== Plot ==
Palanisamy is an uneducated man who dreams to marry a teacher and lives with his friend Dhandapani. Palanisamy falls in love with Hamsaveni at first sight. He decides to go to her village Irugur. First reluctant, she finally agrees to marry him, but only under three conditions: to continue to work as a teacher, to live in her hometown and with her father. After the marriage, Palanisamy imposes her three conditions: she must leave her hometown, be a teacher in the city that he has chosen and leave her father. She accepts them and Palanisamy explains the reason for these conditions.

In the past, Palanisamy lived in a village where a don Aandhavar forced the children to work in his fireworks factory. Palanisamy's father was a doctor and tried to save the children; knowing it, Aandhavar killed him. Aandhavar also killed his sister for the only reason that she was educated. Palanisamy asked many teachers to come to his village but everyone refused for fear of Aandhavar. Palanisamy's only hope is now Hamsaveni. What transpires next forms the rest of the story.

== Cast ==
- Sathyaraj as Palanisamy
- Sukanya as Amsaveni
- Goundamani as Dhandapani
- R. Sundarrajan as Kunju Goundar
- Rekha (guest appearance)
- Srividya
- Nassar
- Kovai Sarala as School Teacher and Salem Annakili
- Babu Antony
- Delhi Ganesh as Palanisamy's father
- Kiruba Shankar as Aandhavar
- Pandu as House Owner
- Mannangatti Subramaniyam as Marimuthu Goundar
- Typist Gopu
- Balambika as Palanisamy's sister
- Gandhimathi as Aandal
- Kamala Kamesh
- Ram-Lakshman
- Karuppu Subbiah
- Vellai Subbaiah
- Tirupur Ramasamy
- Joker Thulasi
- Vikram Dharma in a cameo appearance
- Rajendran
- Balu Anand as Kovil Pusari

== Production ==
Due to the shortage of comedians in Tamil cinema at the time, director Sundarrajan decided to take on a role in the film, making this an early film for him as a comedian.

== Soundtrack ==
The soundtrack was composed by Ilaiyaraaja. The song "Nadu Samathile" is set in Pahadi raga.

Song	Singer(s)	Lyrics	Length
"Amman Kovil"	S. P. Balasubrahmanyam, Sundarrajan, Minmini	Vaali	5:07
"Kuthalakuyile"	Malaysia Vasudevan, Minmini	Gangai Amaran	5:05
"Nadu Samathile"	S. P. Balasubrahmanyam, S. Janaki	Vaali	5:05
"Othaamal Oru"	S. Janaki, S. P. Balasubrahmanyam	Vaali	6:15
"Paatha Kolusu"	S. P. Balasubrahmanyam	Vaali	5:05
"Rendula Nee Onna Thodu Mama"	S. Janaki, Mano	Gangai Amaran	5:02

== Release and reception ==
Thirumathi Palanisamy was released on 25 October 1992, Diwali day. Malini Mannath of The Indian Express gave the film a mixed review citing that "the first half was highly enjoyable and humorous" and she criticised the latter part. C. R. K. of Kalki praised the director for the message of the film.
