= Ganapathy Vanthachi =

2006 film directed by K. S. Saravanan

- Directed by: P. C. Guna
- Written by: P. C. Guna
- Produced by: Media Jeyeshkumar
- Starring: Udhai; Rajesh; Mathisha
- Cinematography: P. C. Guna
- Edited by: K. Velayutham
- Music by: Prasad; Ganesh
- Production company: Prime Movie Makers
- Release date: 15 December 2006
- Running time: 150 minutes
- Country: India
- Language: Tamil

Ganapathy Vanthachi (transl. Ganapathy has arrived) is a 2006 Indian Tamil language comedy drama film directed by K. S. Saravanan. The film stars newcomers Udhai, Rajesh and Mathisha, with Shanmugasundaram, Charle, Pandu, P. Soundara Rajan, Balendran and Viji Ketti playing supporting roles. The film, produced by Media Jeyeshkumar, was released on 15 December 2006.

== Plot ==
The film begins with the little girl Abhi and her grandfather Shanmugasundaram (Shanmugasundaram) walking along the beach. Abhi moves away from her grandfather and drowned at the beach. The kind-hearted young man Ganapathy (Udhai) who witnesses it saves Abhi from drowning. Thereafter, Abhi meets Ganapathy who is cleaning the temple and her grandmother Kamalam thanks him for saving her granddaughter's life that day and takes Ganapathy home. At her home, Ganapathy says that he is an orphan who does odd jobs for a living and Shanmugasundaram offers him a job in his big house filled with children. The new servant Ganapathy easily wins the hearts of the children in a short period of time.

Everything goes well until Ganapathy meets Raghupathi (Rajesh) who tries to enter in Shanmugasundaram's house. A few years ago, in Mumbai, the poor Ganapathy struggles to find a job and the terrorist Raghupathi gives him an assignment. Ganapathy did it triumphantly but when he came to know about Raghupathi's identity, he was shocked and immediately left Mumbai. Raghupathi turns out to be Shanmugasundaram's long-lost son and he wants to stay in his father's house to hide from the police. But Ganapathy beats Raghupathi up and drives him away during the absence of Shanmugasundaram. Later, Shanmugasundaram's family friend Jyothi (Mathisha), a college student, falls in love with Ganapathy and proposes her love to him but the faithful Ganapathy who has a lot of respect for Shanmugasundaram refuses to fall in love with her.

Raghupathi comes back again to the house and Shanmugasundaram welcomes him with open arms. Raghupathi tells Shanmugasundaram that Ganapathy throws him out when Shanmugasundaram wasn't home and Shanmugasundaram orders him to throw Ganapathy out of the house, and he does so. The children who like him so much cannot forget him. Afterwards, Raghupathi has a fight with the other terrorists and Ganapathy comes to his rescue. During the fight, Ganapathy is stabbed and Raghupathi fled from the place. Later that night, Jyothi who sees the unconscious Ganapathy on the middle of the street takes him to the hospital. Raghupathi then tells everything to his father and a guilty Shanmugasundaram goes to the hospital with his family. A few days later, a healed Ganapathy returns to their house and promises that he will never leave them.

== Cast ==
- Udhai as Ganapathy
- Rajesh as Raghupathi
- Mathisha as Jyothi
- Shanmugasundaram as Shanmugasundaram
- Charle as Mani
- Pandu as Vaithi
- Soundar as Vaithi's brother
- Balendran as Kesavan
- Viji Ketti as Kamalam
- Sundari
- Jayashree as Meena
- Jeyabashini
- Baby Mona as Abhi
- Randeep
- Mani
- Gundu Shankar
- Sanjana
- Jeevanandam
- Ragul
- Kovai Senthil as Iyer

== Production ==
P. C. Guna made his directorial debut with Ganapathy Vanthachi under the banner of Prime Movie Makers. P. C. Guna was also in charge of story, screenplay, dialogues, and cinematography. Newcomer Udhai was selected to play the lead role while newcomer Mathisha was chosen to play his love interest. Rajesh was cast to play the second lead role. The director said, "the story revolved around an orphan Ganapathy. He finds employment as a servant in a house filled with children. The children love him. At one point, he gets thrown out of the house. The children are unable to forget him. Why he is thrown out, whether he comes back and who are responsible for his problems form the climax".

== Soundtrack ==
Ganapathy Vanthachi

Soundtrack album by Prasad and Ganesh
- Released: 2006
- Recorded: 2006
- Genre: Feature film soundtrack
- Length: 31:07
- Label: New Music
- Producers: Prasad; Ganesh

The film score and the soundtrack were composed by Prasad and Ganesh. The audio was released in June 2006, director S. P. Muthuraman released the first cassette and CD and producer A. M. Rathnam received it.

Track listing
No.	Title	Lyrics	Singer(s)	Length
1.	"Aadi Varar"	Veera Adithyan	S. P. Balasubrahmanyam, Veeramani Raju, Prabhakar, Sudha Devi	5:34
2.	"Antha Vanam"	S. R. Pavalan	Krishnaraj	4:49
3.	"Kanmani Paramma"	S. R. Pavalan	Mano	5:00
4.	"Kannan Pol"	Palani Bharathi	S. P. Balasubrahmanyam	5:07
5.	"Katru Vanthu"	Prasad	Kovai Subha	5:00
6.	"Sutti Sutti"	S. R. Pavalan	Pradeep	5:37
Total length:				31:07

== Reception ==
S. R. Ashok Kumar of The Hindu said, "Udhay as Ganapathi has done a good job, showing the right emotions at the right time. It is a cakewalk for the seasoned artistes, Shanmugasundaram and Pandu. Charlie, with his potential for both sentiment and humour, has not been fully utilised. Madisha is yet to learn the ropes of acting" and concluded with, "the director has lost all the good work put in by the actors and also the technicians mainly due to inept handling of the story".
