= Chithirai Pookkal =

- Poster
- Directed by: Kanmani Subbu
- Written by: Kanmani Subbu
- Produced by: Kamatchi Thamizhmani; Yasodha Thamizhmani; K. Chidhambaram
- Starring: Jayanthkumar; Vinodhini
- Cinematography: M. V. Ramkrishnan
- Edited by: K. R. Ramalingam
- Music by: M. S. Murali
- Production company: Nachiyar Movies
- Release date: 23 February 1991
- Running time: 140 minutes
- Country: India
- Language: Tamil

Chithirai Pookkal (transl. Chaitra flowers) is a 1991 Indian Tamil-language romance film directed by Kanmani Subbu. The film stars newcomers Jayanthkumar and Vinodhini, with R. Sarathkumar, Radha Ravi, Charle, S. S. Chandran and Vinu Chakravarthy playing supporting roles. It was released on 23 February 1991.

== Plot ==
Hari and his parents as well as Bharathi and her parents settle for the holidays in the same hotel in Ooty. Hari and Bharathi get into several quarrels until they fall in love. Their parents, knowing their love affair, refuse to unite them. Later, the lovers elope and they try to commit suicide. Johnson David, a retired military officer, saves them in time and he accommodates the young lovers. What transpires later forms the crux of the story.

== Cast ==
- Jayanthkumar as Hari
- Vinodhini as Bharathi
- R. Sarathkumar as Johnson David
- Radha Ravi as Lollai Kaadu
- Charle
- S. S. Chandran as Mayil Vahanam, Bharathi's father
- Vinu Chakravarthy as Hari's father
- Kovai Sarala as Bharathi's mother
- Vaani as Hari's mother
- Dr. Nadesan
- Master Kiruba
- Joker Thulasi
- Karmegham

== Production ==
Chithirai Pookkal was directed by Kanmani Subbu, son of lyricist Kannadasan. The film was shot at Munnar and Ooty.

== Soundtrack ==
The soundtrack was composed by M. S. Murali, with lyrics written by Vaali, Ilavenil, Kannadasan, Maruthi and Kanmani Subbu.

Song	Singer(s)	Duration
"Aanandh Geedhangal"	Uma Ramanan	5:00
"Aranam Un Sanidhanam"	Mano, Uma Ramanan	4:57
"Do You Love Me"	Mano, Uma Ramanan	4:17
"Mandhira Punnagai"	Mano	4:58
"Onnu Rendu Moonu"	Mano, Uma Ramanan	4:10
"Sangeetham Kadal"	Mano	4:02
"Vaadi My Dear Lady"	Mano	5:02

== Reception ==
C. R. K. of Kalki called it a lightweight humour with no room for thought and seriousness. The film failed at the box-office and Thamizhmani incurred losses.
