= Suriyan Chandran =

1993 film by K. S. Ravikumar

- Poster
- Directed by: K. S. Ravikumar
- Screenplay by: K. S. Ravikumar
- Story by: S. Ramanath
- Produced by: S. Sivagami
- Starring: Anand Babu; Keerthana; Saravanan
- Cinematography: Ashok Rajan
- Edited by: K. Thanikachalam
- Music by: Deva
- Production company: Ayyannar Cine Arts
- Release date: 25 February 1993
- Country: India
- Language: Tamil

Suriyan Chandran (transl. Sun and moon) is a 1993 Indian Tamil-language masala film written and directed by K. S. Ravikumar from a story by S. Ramanath. The film stars Anand Babu, Keerthana and Saravanan. It was released on 25 February 1993.

== Cast ==
- Anand Babu
- Keerthana
- Saravanan
- K. S. Ravikumar
- R. Sundarrajan
- Vinodhini
- Thyagu
- Pandu
- Viji
- Bayilvan Ranganathan
- Sathyapriya
- Shanmuga Sundari
- Sharmili

== Soundtrack ==
The music was composed by Deva and lyrics were written by Kalidasan.

Track listing
No.	Title	Singer(s)	Length
1.	"Thennanthoppu Malai Oram"	Mano, K. S. Chithra
2.	"Oh Keerthana"	S. P. Balasubrahmanyam, K. S. Chithra
3.	"Saathi Ennada Saathi"	Malaysia Vasudevan, Mano
4.	"Vedanthangalil Oru Penpura"	S. P. Balasubrahmanyam, K. S. Chithra
5.	"Kanni Theevu"	Malaysia Vasudevan, Mano, K. S. Chithra
6.	"Thalaiva Nalama"	Deva, Mano, Malkudi Subha

== Critical reception ==
Ayyappa Prasad of The Indian Express wrote, "Sooriyan Chandran has an interesting storyline marked by good performances by Anand Babu and Saravanan in the main roles". Kalki called it a routine masala fare, but the way it was presented was brand new.
