= Thoongatha Kannindru Ondru =

- Poster
- Directed by: R. Sundarrajan
- Written by: R. Sundarrajan
- Produced by: K. Gopinathan
- Starring: Mohan; Ambika
- Cinematography: N. K. Viswanathan
- Edited by: A. Selvanathan
- Music by: K. V. Mahadevan
- Production company: Bagavathi Creations
- Release date: 4 February 1983
- Country: India
- Language: Tamil

Thoongatha Kannindru Ondru (transl. A sleepless eye) is a 1983 Indian Tamil-language film written and directed by R. Sundarrajan. The film stars Mohan and Ambika. It was released on 4 February 1983.

== Cast ==
- Mohan as Ravi
- Ambika as Devi
- V. K. Ramasamy as Ravi's father
- S. Ve. Shekher as Unni Kosthepu
- M. R. Krishnamurthy
- V. M. John
- S. Varalakshmi
- Vaani
- Ponni
- Rajapriya

== Production ==
The film was in production as early as May 1982. Mohan's voice was dubbed by S. N. Surendar.

== Soundtrack ==
The music was composed by K. V. Mahadevan. The song "Nee Azhaithadhu Pol" attained popularity.

Track listing
No.	Title	Lyrics	Singer(s)	Length
1.	"Nee Azhaithadhu Pol"	Pulamaipithan	S. P. Balasubrahmanyam	5:09
2.	"Aadi Vellam"	A. Maruthakasi	Malaysia Vasudevan, S. P. Sailaja	4:31
3.	"Idhaya Vaasal"	Muthulingam	S. P. Balasubrahmanyam, S. Janaki	4:32
4.	"Mazhai Vizhum"	Muthulingam	K. J. Yesudas, S. Janaki	4:03
Total length:				18:15

== Release and reception ==
The film was originally scheduled to release in January 1983, during Pongal, but ultimately released on 4 February. Thiraignani of Kalki wrote the difficulty in pronouncing the title is also same as watching the film.
