= Seethanam =

- Theatrical release poster
- Directed by: R. Sundarrajan
- Written by: R. Sundarrajan
- Produced by: T. Siva
- Starring: Prabhu; Sangita; Ranjitha
- Cinematography: Rajarajan
- Edited by: Ashok Mehtha
- Music by: Deva
- Production company: Amma Creations
- Release date: 24 November 1995
- Running time: 150 minutes
- Country: India
- Language: Tamil

Seethanam (/siːθənəm/ transl. Dowry) is a 1995 Indian Tamil-language crime film directed by R. Sundarrajan and produced by T. Siva. The film stars Prabhu, Sangita and Ranjitha. It was released on 24 November 1995.

== Plot ==
After serving a 5-year prison sentence, Muthu Manickam is awaiting a chance to take revenge against corrupt businessman Marimuthu, who falsely accused him with the help of corrupt police officials. During his imprisonment, Muthu Manickam's uncle, Govindan, frequently gets arrested for petty crimes to visit his son-in-law and check on his well-being. Upon his release, Muthu Manickam returns to his village to exact revenge on Marimuthu, who terrorizes the villagers and forces them to work in his illicit liquor factory. Muthu Manickam starts by beating up Marimuthu's henchmen, gaining the villagers' support. He then kills two corrupt policemen who are in Marimuthu's pocket, using Sarasu as a lure.

Radha, a lawyer and sister of Inspector Rajasekhar, witnesses this and reports it to her brother. Rajasekhar attempts to arrest Muthu Manickam, but they engage in a one-on-one fight where Muthu Manickam overpowers Rajasekhar, sparing his life and leaving him at his home. Enraged, Radha vows to imprison Muthu Manickam for murder and takes the case to court. However, Rajasekhar falsely testifies that Muthu Manickam didn't assault him, resulting in the case being dismissed. Radha then falsely accuses Muthu Manickam of attempting to rape her. After the court proceedings, Muthu Manickam escapes and kidnaps Radha to reveal the truth about his past.

Muthu Manickam was a jovial youth on the cusp of joining the police force. He stumbles upon illicit activities in the village theater, including illegal liquor supply, sensual dance, and gambling. At the request of the village women, Muthu Manickam, who is also the village panchayat head, decides to punish Marimuthu. The women, led by Muthu Manickam's cousin Dhanalakshmi "Dhanam", who is soon to marry Muthu Manickam, chew betel leaves and spit on Marimuthu as a form of punishment. Humiliated, Marimuthu vows to seek revenge on Muthu Manickam and Dhanam. Muthu Manickam joins the police force as a constable and informs Dhanam that he will marry her once he gets promoted to Inspector. To aid his promotion, Dhanam and her father, Govindan, attempt to commit petty crimes in the village, but their efforts don't yield the desired results. However, Muthu Manickam eventually gets promoted to Inspector and is appointed to the same village.

Marimuthu resumes his illicit liquor manufacturing activities, and Muthu Manickam single-handedly beats and arrests him. However, his superior officer, DSP Kalimuthu, who is Radha's father, asks Muthu Manickam to release Marimuthu, but he refuses. Dhanam becomes pregnant, and when she's about to give birth, Muthu Manickam rushes her to the hospital. However, Marimuthu and his henchmen stop them, and in the rain, Dhanam self-delivers their baby. Muthu Manickam gets into a fight with Marimuthu's henchmen and corrupt police inspectors, during which he accidentally stabs one of the henchmen. The corrupt police officers arrest Muthu Manickam, and Dhanam dies after childbirth due to complications. Muthu Manickam is sentenced to 5 years in prison.

Muthu Manickam finishes his flashback, revealing the truth about his past to Radha. Realizing her father, Kalimuthu's, corruption, Radha joins forces with Muthu Manickam. Together, they devise a plan to have Marimuthu arrested and jailed, intending for him to escape with Kalimuthu's help and then be caught in the act of trying to kill Muthu Manickam. As planned, Marimuthu is arrested and later attempts to kill Muthu Manickam. However, the villagers intervene, and a fight ensues. Muthu Manickam kills Marimuthu, avenging Dhanam's death. The corrupt officials are sentenced to 5 years in prison. In the end, Muthu Manickam receives a one-year sentence for killing Marimuthu, and begins his sentence after entrusting his daughter to Radha's care.

== Cast ==
- Prabhu as Muthu Manickam
- Sangita as Dhanalakshmi "Dhanam"
- Ranjitha as Radha, Advocate
- Mansoor Ali Khan as Marimuthu
- R. Sundarrajan as Govindan, Dhanam's father
- S. S. Chandran as Varadarajan, Constable
- Vinu Chakravarthy as Kalimuthu, Radha's father
- Prakash Raj as Inspector Rajasekhar, Radha's brother
- Vichithra as Sarasu
- Santhana Bharathi as a corrupt Inspector
- Thyagu as a corrupt Inspector
- Rajasekhar as a corrupt Inspector
- Pandu as Dr. Thandavarayan
- Mohan Raman as an Inspector
- MRK as an advocate
- Balu Anand as a thief
- Periya Karuppu Thevar as a prisonmate
- Kovai Senthil as a villager
- Chelladurai as a villager
- Otta Vai Narayana as a villager
- Vellai Subbaiah as a villager
- Karuppu Subbiah as a villager
- Krishnamoorthy as Marimuthu's henchman

== Soundtrack ==
The music was composed by Deva, with lyrics written by R. Sundarrajan.

Song	Singer(s)	Duration
"Chinnavaru"	K. S. Chithra	4:44
"Rathiri Puthu Rathiri"	K. S. Chithra	4:40
"Selaikku Potta"	Mano, K. S. Chithra	5:13
"Valayal"	S. Kuzhanthaivelu, K. S. Chithra	5:00
"Vanthalaappa" (duet)	Mano, K. S. Chithra	4:57
"Vanthalaappa" (male)	Mano	4:57
"Vanthalaappa" (female)	K. S. Chithra	4:57

== Critical reception ==
D. S. Ramanujam of The Hindu wrote, "The desperate eagerness to do something new only lands the director in sorts of trouble, the first half being a mockery, the director, his acting inclusive, and his screenplay being woefully inadequate" but found the second half "enjoyable to an extent".
