= Pondatti Rajyam =

- Theatrical release poster
- Directed by: K. S. Ravikumar
- Screenplay by: K. S. Ravikumar
- Story by: Agathiyan
- Produced by: K. Prabhakaran
- Starring: Saravanan; Ranjitha; Chithra
- Cinematography: Ashok Rajan
- Edited by: K. Thanikachalam
- Music by: Deva
- Production company: Anbalaya Films
- Release date: 15 August 1992
- Running time: 138 minutes
- Country: India
- Language: Tamil

Pondatti Rajyam (transl. Martial regime) is a 1992 Indian Tamil-language comedy drama film directed by K. S. Ravikumar. The film stars Saravanan, Ranjitha and Chithra, with the director Ravikumar and Raja Ravindra in supporting roles. It was released on 15 August 1992. The film was remade in Telugu as Akka Pettanam Chelleli Kapuram.

== Plot ==
Krishnan, an engineer working at a roof tiles company owned by R. Sundarrajan, meets Bharathi at a hotel and settles her bill. They fall in love and get married. Influenced by her sister, Bharathi begins to suspect Krishnan of infidelity. While pregnant, Krishnan travels to Kanyakumari for work. There, he meets his friend Sundaresan, who plans to marry Sona. During an accident while saving Krishnan, Sundaresan dies. Later, Bharathi gives birth to their child. Krishnan brings Sona to Chennai, but Bharathi and her sister expel her. Krishnan then returns with Sona to Kanyakumari, where she gives birth to Sundaresan’s son, and he cares for them. Bharathi, still suspicious, visits Kanyakumari and finds Sona and her child. In anger, she asks Krishnan to tie a Mangal Sutra on Sona, but he refuses, claiming Sona is like a sister. Sandhegam and Sundarrajan arrive with proof of Sona’s pre-registered marriage and the accident news, clearing all misunderstandings. Bharathi realizes her mistake, and Sundarrajan takes Sona and her child under his care.

== Cast ==
- Saravanan as Krishnan
- Ranjitha as Bharathi
- Sona as Sona
- Chithra as Bharathi's sister
- Raja Ravindra as Sundaresan
- Chinni Jayanth as Peon
- K. S. Ravikumar as Sandhegam
- Kovai Sarala
- R. Sundarrajan as MD of Company
- C. R. Saraswathi

== Production ==
The film was initially titled Malligai Mullai.

== Soundtrack ==
The music was composed by Deva and lyrics written by Kalidasan. The song "Raagam Ondru" was originally composed for the film Adhikaalai Subavelai which never released.

Song	Singers
"Anilukku Moonu Kodu"	S. Janaki, S. P. Balasubrahmanyam
"Ettukudi Velavare"	Malaysia Vasudevan
"Naalu Pakkam Kadalu"	S. P. Balasubrahmanyam
"Pondatti Rajyamthan"	Mano, S. Janaki
"Raagam Ondru"	Mano, S. Janaki
"Thandaal Edungada"	S. P. Balasubrahmanyam
"Uchimara Pachakiliye"	P. Jayachandran

== Critical reception ==
Malini Mannath of The Indian Express wrote, "the direction by K. S. Ravikumar is smooth [..] and the situations are imaginatively handled." Supraja Sridharan of Kalki praised the performances of cast and concluded that Ravikumar who made us laugh for two and half hours could have avoided double meaning dialogues at certain places.
