= R. Sundarrajan =

Indian actor and director (born 1951)

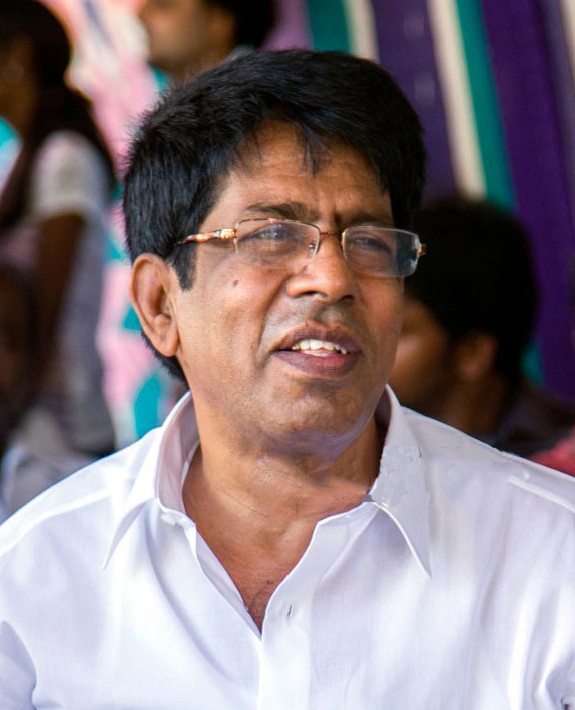
- Sundarrajan in 2015
- Born: 9 January 1951 (age 75); Dharapuram, Coimbatore, Tamil Nadu, India
- Occupations: Actor, director, writer
- Years active: 1982–present
- Spouse: Rajeshwari (m. 1974)
- Children: 3
- Awards: Kalaimamani Award (1999)

R. Sundarrajan (born 8 January 1951) is an Indian film director, actor, comedian and writer for Tamil language films. Active primarily in the 1980s and the 1990s as a filmmaker, he appeared more often as an actor thereafter. Sundarajan is known for his silver jubilee films such as Payanangal Mudivathillai (1982), Vaidehi Kathirunthal (1984), Rajadhi Raja (1989) and Thirumathi Palanisamy (1992). He directed over 25 films in his career and most of them became profitable ventures in the box office.

== Career ==
He has served as an actor, filmmaker and a director. He is very well appreciated and a name of honor in Tamil film industry. He began his career as an actor in 1981, but he subsequently made his directorial debut a year after making his acting debut, with Payanangal Mudivathillai (1982). He collaborated with actor Mohan for his maiden directorial venture, Payanangal Mudivathillai and the film became a sleeper hit and ran for over 175 days in the box office. He furthered his collaboration with Mohan through films including Thoongatha Kannindru Ondru (1983), Saranalayam (1983), Naan Paadum Paadal (1984), Kunguma Chimil (1985) and Mella Thirandhathu Kadhavu (1986). Apart from Thoongatha Kannindru Ondru, the other films were well received at the box office and became commercially successful.

Balu Anand served as Sundarrajan's assistant director for 35 years and there is a backstory of how Balu Anand became an assistant director of Sundarrajan. During the 1970s, Balu Anand who hailed from Coimbatore sought assistance by walking into R. Sundarrajan's office with the intention to secure a job for his livelihood. Sundarrajan initially hesitated to include Balu Anand with him as an assistant, but Balu Anand's determination literally impressed Sundarrajan. Balu Anand told Sundarrajan "Give me five rupees and I can eat for a day, give me a job in films and I can feed myself for a lifetime".

He made his maiden collaboration with Vijayakanth through Vaidehi Kathirunthal (1984), which eventually became a turning point in Vijayakanth's acting career. R. Sundarrajan convinced Vijayakanth to act in romantic film in a soft role and Vijayakanth agreed to play a "soft role" at a time when he starred in many action films and was branded an action hero. It was through R. Sundarrajan, Vijayakanth changed his mind to commit to such a film genre, although it was not Vijayakanth's comfort zone. R. Sundarrajan then collaborated with his long-time assistant director Balu Anand to write screenplay for Balu Anand's debut directorial venture Naane Raja Naane Mandhiri (1985), which starred Vijayakanth in the main lead role.

He also join hands with Vijayakanth for his directorial venture Amman Kovil Kizhakale (1986) and the film also became a box office success. Vijayakanth also won the Filmfare Award for Best Actor – Tamil for his performances in Amman Kovil kizhakale and R. Sundarrajan once again brought out the soft lighter version of Vijayakanth through the film.

His handshake scene with Vadivelu in the film Kaalam Maari Pochu (1996), where Vadivelu was reportedly saying "kaiya kudu sagala" became a viral internet meme template and has been frequently used in social media platforms by users. He is also known for his humorous dialogue deliveries in films. One of his notable hilarious comedy scenes came in Seethanam (1995), where he gives an empty paper to a trespasser and asks him to throw it as it is empty by saying there is nothing written on it.

He was also one of the 14 directors who helped to direct the film Suyamvaram (1999), which was shot and filmed within 24 hours. Suyamvaram set the Guinness World Record for casting the most stars in a film and also for being the quickest ever feature-length film made in the world. R. Sundarrajan has shared screenspace with prominent actors including Rajinikanth, Kamal Haasan, Vijayakanth, Sathyaraj, Sarath Kumar, Prabhu, Pandiarajan, Murali, Vijay, Ajith Kumar and Suriya.

Sundarrajan's last movie as director came in 2013 with Chithirayil Nilachoru. He also regularly attends meetings of T. Nagar Humour Club which was launched in 2008. As of 2026, Sundarrajan is the treasurer of the South Indian Film Writers Association.

== Personal life ==
Sundarrajan married Rajeshwari in 1974. He has three sons: Ashok, Karthik and Deepak. Karthik died in 2004 in a road accident. Deepak made his directorial debut in 2021 with Annabelle Sethupathi. Ashok acted in his father's directorial Chithirayil Nilachoru.

== Filmography ==
=== As director ===
Year	Film	Notes
1982	Payanangal Mudivathillai	
1982	Antha Rathirikku Satchi Illai	
1983	Saranalayam	
1983	Thoongatha Kannindru Ondru	
1984	Naan Paadum Paadal	
1984	Vaidehi Kathirunthal	
1985	Sugamana Raagangal	
1985	Kunguma Chimil	
1986	Amman Kovil Kizhakale	
1986	Mella Thirandhathu Kadhavu	
1986	Thazhuvatha Kaigal	
1988	Kaalaiyum Neeye Maalaiyum Neeye	
1988	En Jeevan Paduthu	
1989	Rajadhi Raja	
1990	Thalattu Padava	
1990	Engitta Mothathay	
1991	Sami Potta Mudichu	
1991	Oyilattam	
1992	Thirumathi Palanisamy	
1994	En Aasai Machan	
1995	Gandhi Pirantha Mann	
1995	Seethanam	
1997	Kaalamellam Kaathiruppen	
1999	Suyamvaram	
2013	Chithirayil Nilachoru	

=== As actor ===
==== Films ====
Year	Film	Role	Notes
1981	Oruthi Mattum Karaiyinile		
1990	Oru Puthiya Kathai		
1991	Sami Potta Mudichu		Also director
1991	Oyilattam	Aarumuga Udayar	Also director
1992	Therku Theru Machan	Paramasivan	
1992	Bharathan	Gangadharan's man	
1992	Pattathu Raani		Guest appearance
1992	Pondatti Rajyam		
1992	Thirumathi Palanisamy	Kunju Gounder	Also director
1993	Suriyan Chandiran		
1993	Madhumathi		
1993	Rajadhi Raja Raja Kulothunga Raja Marthanda Raja Gambeera Kathavaraya Krishna Kamarajan		
1993	Kattalai	Natarajan	
1993	Naan Pesa Ninaipathellam	Sandhya's father	
1993	Sakkarai Devan	Appu	
1993	Udan Pirappu		
1993	Poranthalum Ambalaiya Porakka Koodathu	Veerapaandi	
1993	Rajadurai		
1993	Enga Muthalali	Narayana Reddy	
1993	Purusha Lakshanam	Rajgopal	
1994	Amaidhi Padai		
1994	Subramaniya Swamy	Rathnasamy	
1994	Rasa Magan	Appachi	
1994	Namma Annachi		
1994	En Aasai Machan		Also director
1994	May Madham	All in All	
1994	Sathyavan	Anjaneya	
1994	Karuththamma	Soosai	Uncredited role
1994	Veera Padhakkam		
1995	Engirundho Vandhan	Sundaram	
1995	Karuppu Nila	Sundaram	
1995	Ellame En Rasathan		
1995	Thirumoorthy	Geetha's brother	
1995	Chellakannu	Nagarajan	
1995	Anbu Magan		
1995	Marumagan	Muniyandi	
1995	Gandhi Pirantha Mann		Also director
1995	Raasaiyya	Kili's cousin	
1995	Mr. Madras	Aruna's son	
1995	Thaikulame Thaikulame		
1995	Makkal Aatchi		
1995	Seethanam	Govindan	Also director
1996	Amman Kovil Vaasalile		
1996	Kaalam Maari Pochu	Murugesan	
1996	Veetukkulle Thiruvizha		
1996	Enakkoru Magan Pirappan	Ranganayaki's husband	
1997	Dharma Chakkaram	Kannukku Pillai	
1997	Kaalamellam Kaathiruppen	Govinda	Also director
1997	Gopura Deepam		
1997	Kaalamellam Kadhal Vaazhga	Principal Venkatraman	
1997	Mannava	Eashwar's father	
1997	Suryavamsam	Sadhasivam	
1997	Periya Idathu Mappillai	Gopalakrishnan's father	
1997	Kalyana Vaibhogam	Ganesan	
1997	Janakiraman	Janakiraman's uncle	
1998	Marumalarchi	Rasu Padayachi's uncle	
1998	Kondattam	Bhaskaran	
1998	Ini Ellam Sugame	Mani	
1998	Santhosham		
1998	Veera Thalattu		
1998	Ninaithen Vandhai	Savithri's uncle	
1998	Ponnu Velayira Bhoomi	Arumugam	
1998	Natpukkaga	Kannukku Pillai	
1998	Kalyana Galatta		
1998	En Aasai Rasave		
1998	Senthooram	Sadayappan	
1998	Ponmaanai Thedi	Chinna Paiyan	
1999	Mannavaru Chinnavaru	Minor Rajamani	
1999	Chinna Durai		
1999	Annan	Sundari's father	
1999	Periyanna		
1999	Simmarasi		
1999	Minsara Kanna	Inspector Shiva Kumar	
1999	Thirupathi Ezhumalai Venkatesa		
1999	Paattali	Kaalaiyan	
2000	Vallarasu	Raheem's brother	
2000	Simmasanam	Kannamma's father	
2000	Unnai Kann Theduthey		
2001	En Purushan Kuzhandhai Maadhiri	Maheswari's father	
2001	Sigamani Ramamani	Neelakandan, Sigamani's father	
2001	Viswanathan Ramamoorthy	Ramamoorthy's father	
2001	Kabadi Kabadi	Arumugam	
2002	Unnai Ninaithu	Chittoor Chinnamani	
2002	Namma Veetu Kalyanam		
2002	Game		
2003	Anbu Thollai	Devarajan	
2003	Priyamaana Thozhi	Ashok's father	
2003	Vani Mahal		
2003	Enakku 20 Unakku 18	Train Passenger (Guest Appearance)	
2005	Kaatrullavarai	Kannukku Pillai	
2005	Chidambarathil Oru Appasamy	Elangovan's father-in-law	
2006	Thirupathi	Thirupathi's father	
2007	Ennai Paar Yogam Varum	Anandaraman	
2008	Thodakkam		
2008	Kuselan	Srinivasan	
2008	Kathanayakudu	Srinivas	Telugu film
2008	Dasavathaaram	Member of Legislative Assembly	
2009	Oru Kadhalan Oru Kadhali		
2010	Ambasamudram Ambani		
2010	Kaadhal Solla Vandhen	Nanu Prabhu's father	
2010	Aattanayagann	Lingam	
2011	En Ullam Unnai Theduthey		
2012	Kandathum Kanathathum		
2013	Chandhamama	Chief Editor	
2013	Chithirayil Nilachoru	Sundaram	Also director
2014	Poojai	Temple Trustee	
2014	Lingaa	Sambandham	
2015	Naanum Rowdydhaan	Ghilli's advisor	
2015	Oru Naal Iravil	Film director	
2017	Saaya		
2018	Kilambitaangayaa Kilambitaangayaa		
2018	Tamizh Padam 2	Bharath	
2018	Pattinapakkam		
2019	Pettikadai		
2019	Perazhagi ISO		
2020	Ooratchi Ondriyam		
2021	Calls	Security Alagar	
2021	Boom Boom Kaalai		
2021	Michaelpatty Raja	Raja's father	
2021	Namma Oorukku Ennadhan Achu		
2021	Chinna Pannai Periya Pannai		
2022	Paruva Kadhal		
2023	Unnaal Ennaal		
2023	80s Buildup	Kathir's grandfather	
2023	Moothakudi		
2024	Vaa Pagandaya		
2024	Vidinja Enakku Kalyanam		
2025	Madha Gaja Raja	Inspector Srinivasan	
2025	Kudumbasthan	Palanichamy	
2025	Yaman Kattalai		
2025	Others	Kasinathan	
2026	Sathyavan Savithiri		

==== Television ====
Year	Title	Role	Channel
2018–2019	Kalyanamam Kalyanam	Kamali's grandfather	Star Vijay
2018–2020	Kalyana Veedu	Kathiresan	Sun TV
2023–Present	Siragadikka Aasai	Annamalai	Star Vijay

=== As writer only ===
Year	Film	Notes
1985	Naane Raja Naane Mandhiri	
1986	Poove Ilam Poove	
1987	Idhu Oru Thodar Kathai	

=== As lyricist ===
Year	Film	Songs	Notes
1995	Gandhi Pirandhha Mann	"Aalamarathula", "Gandhi Endru", "Ottagathil Nee", "Thalaiva Naan"	
1995	Seethanam	all songs	
1997	Kaalamellam Kaathiruppen	all songs	

=== As singer ===
Year	Film	Songs	Composer	Notes
1998	Senthooram	"Adi Unna Kaanama"	Ilayaraja	

== Awards ==
- Kalaimamani Award - 1999
