= Vaidehi Kathirunthal =

1984 film by R. Sundarrajan

- Poster
- Directed by: R. Sundarrajan
- Written by: R. Sundarrajan
- Produced by: Thooyavan
- Starring: Vijayakanth; Revathi
- Cinematography: Raja Rajan
- Edited by: M. Shrinivasan; B. Krishnakumar
- Music by: Ilaiyaraaja
- Production company: Appu Movies
- Distributed by: K. R. Enterprises
- Release date: 23 October 1984
- Running time: 140 minutes
- Country: India
- Language: Tamil

Vaidehi Kathirunthal (transl. Vaidehi waited) is a 1984 Indian Tamil-language romantic drama film written and directed by R. Sundarrajan. The film stars Vijayakanth and Revathi as two villagers, Vellaisamy and Vaidehi, whose lives undergo a drastic turn when they meet. They discover that they must join forces to save a young couple from the wrath of the other villagers.

Vaidehi Kaathirundhal's story was developed based on songs that Ilaiyaraaja had composed, hoping to use them in potential film. The film was released on 23 October 1984, became a commercial success and emerged a breakthrough in Vijayakanth's career. It was remade in Telugu as Manchi Manasulu (1986), and in Kannada as Preethi Nee Illade Naa Hegirali (2004).

== Plot ==
Vellaisamy is an unkempt derelict who lives by the village temple doing menial jobs to survive, but has an impressive singing ability. Vaidehi is a young widow who lives in the village with her sorrowing, alcoholic father. Minutes after Vaidehi's marriage, the groom and his parents died in a boat accident. This led to the village ostracising her and forbidding her to practice dance, which she was talented in. Her father, though rich, took to drinking upon seeing his daughter's fate.

One day, when some villagers spot Vellaisamy scribbling Vaidehi's name on the temple walls, rumours about them start circling. When a distressed Vaidehi approaches and questions Vellaisamy why he has been writing her name on the walls, he reveals his tragic past and how he lost the woman of his affection, also named Vaidehi.

Vellaisamy and his widowed mother lived in another village. His cousin Vaidehi, who was also brought up with him, had high hopes of marrying him. Despite being in love with Vaidehi, Vellaisamy neglected her for fun. After buying wedding jewels for Vaidehi, he played a final prank on her by telling her that he was engaged to someone else. Distraught, Vaidehi ate poisonous seeds and died in Vellaisamy's arms. Within weeks, Vellaisamy's mother also died. Vellaisamy gave his properties to poor people and moved to his present village for closure.

Vellaisamy and Vaidehi now share a mutual respect for each other's melancholic lives, but soon realise that they need to work together to unite Nataraj and Sengamalam, a young couple in love, against the wrath of the whole village, particularly Sengamalam's ruthless brother Vellikizhamai Ramasamy. In the end, Vellaisamy is killed by Ramasamy's goons in the melee, and the young lovers are united, while Vaidehi is left alone.

== Cast ==
- Vijayakanth as Vellaisamy
- Revathi as Vaidehi
- Goundamani as All in All Azhagu Raja
- Senthil as Komutti Thalaiya
- Usilai Mani as a shopkeeper
- Vellai Subbaiah as a singer in the coracle
- Vadivukkarasi as Vellaisamy's mother
- Kokila as Sengamalam
- Sarala as All in All Azhaguraja's wife
- Master Tinku
- Baby Kalpana
- Parimalam as Vaidehi, Vellaisamy's past lover
- Sivankumar as Nataraj
- T. S. Raghavendar as Vaidehi's father
- Radha Ravi as Vellikizhamai Ramasamy

== Production ==
After Ilaiyaraaja finished composing the songs of Kaakki Sattai (1985) in half-a-day, well before the three-day schedule, he started to compose other songs since he was free at that time; he ended up composing six songs, hoping to use them in a potential film. Producer-lyricist Panchu Arunachalam, who used to listen to Ilaiyaraaja's unused songs and pick any of them he liked for future projects, wanted one of the six tunes for the film that would become Vaidehi Kathirunthal. But Ilaiyaraaja insisted that he listen to all six tunes; the producer did so, and the storyline of Vaidehi Kathirunthal was developed based on them.

The title was derived from a line from the song "Vasanthathil Orr Naal" from Moondru Deivangal (1971). The film was written and directed by R. Sundarrajan, and produced by Thooyavan under Appu Movies, while Arunachalam was credited as presenter. Cinematography was handled by Raja Rajan, and editing by M. Shrinivasan and B. Krishnakumar. Vijayakanth agreed to play a "soft role" at a time when he was branded an action hero. Anitha Kuppusamy was initially offered to be the lead actress, but she declined, citing a lack of interest in an acting career; the role went to Revathi. This was the Tamil debut of Kannada actress Pramila Joshai (credited as Parimalam), and the feature film debut of T. S. Raghavendra (credited as Raghavendar) and Sivankumar. Shooting took place predominantly at the banks of the Noyyal River.

== Soundtrack ==
The music was composed by Ilaiyaraaja. The song "Kaathirunthu" is set in the Carnatic raga known as Shivaranjani, "Azhagu Malaraada" is set in Chandrakauns, and "Inraiku Yen Indha" is set in Abhogi. Y. G. Mahendran's wife Sudha had been contacted by Ilaiyaraaja's manager to sing in the film but, incorrectly believing it was a prank call, declined. For every day Vaidehi Kaathirundhal played at a theatre in Cumbum, "Rasathi Unna" attracted the attention of wild elephants which came near the theatre and remained till the song ended before returning to the forest. P. Jayachandran, the singer of this song, "Kaathirunthu" and "Inraiku Yen Indha", said all three songs were recorded within a day.

Track listing
No.	Title	Lyrics	Singer(s)	Length
1.	"Rasathi Unnai"	Vaali	P. Jayachandran	5:36
2.	"Azhagu Malaraada"	Vaali	S. Janaki, T. S. Raghavendra	5:31
3.	"Kaathirunthu"	Vaali	P. Jayachandran	4:23
4.	"Megam Karukayilae"	Panchu Arunachalam	Ilaiyaraaja, Uma Ramanan	4:28
5.	"Inraiku Yen Indha"	Gangai Amaran	P. Jayachandran, Vani Jairam	4:29
6.	"Raasavae Unnai"	Vaali	P. Susheela	3:25
Total length:				27:52

== Release and reception ==
Vaidehi Kaathirundhal was released on 23 October 1984, Diwali day. The Tamil magazine Ananda Vikatan, in its issue dated 2 December 1984, carried the reviews of multiple people who had seen the film. The review board of the magazine gave the film a rating of 44 out of 100 based on these reviews, with the consensus being favourable towards Ilaiyaraaja's music and critical towards the multiple storylines stitched together. Kalki's critic posted similar views, praising the music but noting that despite so many positives, the film fell apart due to the subpar story. Balumani of Anna praised acting, music, humour, cinematography and direction. Despite facing competition from other Diwali releases such as Nallavanukku Nallavan and the Tamil-dubbed version of the Malayalam-language My Dear Kuttichathan, the film was a commercial success, running for over 100 days in theatres. It was remade in Telugu as Manchi Manasulu (1986), and in Kannada as Preethi Nee Illade Naa Hegirali (2004).

== Legacy ==
Vaidehi Kathirundhal emerged a breakthrough in Vijayakanth's career. According to film journalist Sreedhar Pillai, it was one of the films that made him the "Raja of B and C stations". The waterfalls where the film was shot was renamed Vaideki Falls after the film. The quote "Petromax lightey venuma" (transl. Do you want only the Petromax light?) spoken by Goundamani's character became a popular phrase in Tamil Nadu and refers to someone wanting and persisting on something particular. The quote also inspired a song of the same name in Aranmanai (2014). The Chennai-based brand Dude Thamizha prints T-shirts that carry the dialogue which are their best-sellers too. The character name of Goundamani, All in All Azhagu Raja, was also used as the title of a 2013 film, while the 2019 film Petromax derives its title from that character's dialogue.

== Bibliography ==
- Sundararaman (2007) [2005]. Raga Chintamani: A Guide to Carnatic Ragas Through Tamil Film Music (2nd ed.). Chennai: Pichhamal Chintamani. OCLC 295034757.
