= N. Mathrubootham =

Indian psychiatrist, writer, actor and director (1944-2004)

- Born: 2 July 1944; Tiruchirappalli, Madras Presidency, British India (now Tamil Nadu, India)
- Died: 18 November 2004 (aged 60); Chennai, Tamil Nadu, India
- Occupations: medical practitioner, counselor, psychiatrist
- Known for: sex education and counseling, film roles

N. Mathrubootham (2 July 1944 – 18 November 2004) was an Indian psychiatrist, writer, actor and director who was known for his work on sex education. He also acted as a comedian in some Tamil films.

== Early life ==
Mathrubootham was born in Tiruchirappalli on 2 July 1944. He had his early education in Tiruchirappalli and obtained his M. B. B. S. degree from the Stanley Medical College, Chennai in 1966. Mathrubootham went on to pursue his master's degree and obtained a doctorate in psychiatry. On completion of his doctorate studies, he joined Institute of Mental Health, Chennai as a lecturer.

== Career ==
Joining the Institute of Mental Health as a lecturer, Mathrubootham rose to become Professor of Psychiatry. He also served simultaneously as Psychiatry Professor at Kilpauk Medical College. Mathrubootham was awarded the Dr. Marfatia award by the Indian Psychiatrists Association for his research on alcohol addiction and the Pinnacle award for his multilingual sex education film "Puthira Punithama".

== Death ==
In his later life, Mathrubootham suffered from arthritis and renal diseases. He died on 18 November 2004 due to cardiac arrest.

== Filmography ==
Mathrubootham also acted in summary roles as comedian in a few Tamil films along with Vivek.

Director

- Puthira Punithama (2000)

Actor

Year	Film	Role	Notes
1999	Vaalee	Himself	Uncredited role
2000	Kandukondain Kandukondain	Manohar's father	
2000	Puthira Punithama	Himself	
2001	Pennin Manathai Thottu	Prof. Das alias Lord Labakkudaas	
2001	Shahjahan	Dr. M. Das	
2003	Whistle	Doctor	
2007	Thullal	Das/Giri/Chand/Pillai/3	Uncredited role
