= Vindhya (disambiguation) =

Vindhya may refer to:

- Vindhya Range in central India
- Vindhya (actress), Indian actress
- Lethe vindhya, the black forester, a butterfly found in India and Indochina
- Vindhya Pradesh, a former state of India
