= Kadhal Kirukkan =

- Poster
- Directed by: Sakthi Chidambaram
- Screenplay by: Sakthi Chidambaram
- Based on: Deewangee (Hindi)
- Produced by: A. Ahamed
- Starring: Parthiban Richa Pallod Vineeth
- Cinematography: Suresh Devan
- Edited by: Kesavan L.
- Music by: Deva
- Production company: Variety Frames
- Release date: 19 December 2003
- Running time: 150 minutes
- Country: India
- Language: Tamil

Kadhal Kirukkan (transl. Love crazy man) is a 2003 Indian Tamil-language romantic thriller film, written and directed by Sakthi Chidambaram. The film stars Parthiban in the main lead role alongside Richa Pallod and Vineeth. It is the Tamil remake of the 2002 Hindi film Deewangee.

== Plot ==
Saravanan and Selvi Maha are childhood friends. Saravanan is so madly in love with Maha that it turns him into a killer. Knifing or gunning down anyone who comes in the way of Maha and himself, is almost child's play for Saravanan. From an old man to a posse of policemen, his victims are many and the mayhem is endless. But listlessness and dejection set in when Maha tells him that she is not in love with him. How he reacts to her revelation forms the rest of the story.

== Cast ==
- Parthiban as Saravanan (Palani)
- Richa Pallod as Selvi Maha
- Vineeth as Lawyer Gautham
- Vadivelu as Kalyanasundaram
- Sriman as a Police officer
- Thalaivasal Vijay as a Lawyer
- Raj Kapoor as Ravi Varma
- Udaya Prakash as Kavidhangel
- Singamuthu as Marriage broker
- Devadarshini as Doctor
- Manobala as Doctor
- Meera Krishnan as Gautham's mother
- C. Duraipandian as P. Krishnan
- Keerthana as P. Krishnan's wife
- Krishnamoorthy as Astrologer
- Vincent Roy as Saravanan's father
- S. Rajasekar as Selvi Maha's father
- Anjali Devi as Saravanan's mother
- Srividya Shankar as Selvi Maha's mother
- Bonda Mani as Shop owner
- Vijay Ganesh as Shop owner
- Boys Rajan as Music producer
- King Kong as Servant
- Dhadha Muthukumar as Bride's father
- Chelladurai as Bride's father
- Siva Narayana Murthy as Land owner
- Priyanka as Police officer in Mufti
- Ramdoss as Servant (uncredited role)
- Nagendra Prasad in a special appearance in the song "Poththu"
- Junior Silk in a special appearance

== Soundtrack ==
The film's soundtrack was composed by Deva.

Song	Singer(s)	Lyrics	Duration
"Paruva Thiruda"	Anitha Chandrashekar	Pa. Vijay	6:36
"Poove Mudhal Poove" (male)	Harish Raghavendra	Kabilan	4:36
"Poove Mudhal Poove" (female)	Chinmayee	Kabilan	4:36
"Yea Penna"	Krishnaraj	Sakthi Chidambaram	5:43
"Onna Naan"	Vadivelu	Snehan	4:36
"Poththu"	Manikka Vinayagam, Malathy	Deva Kumar	4:55

== Reception ==
Malathi Rangarajan of The Hindu wrote, "IF THE story borrowed needs to be refurbished, it ought to be done. So when "Deewangee" comes to Tamil as "Kadhal Kirukkan" (from Variety Films) the director could have improved upon the original, instead of just being satisfied with the introduction of a new comedy track. All the same, "Kirukkan" has his bright moments too". Malini Mannath of Chennai Online wrote "Finally, the director’s earlier films ‘Ennamma Kannu’ and ‘Charlie Chaplin’ were light-hearted entertainers. The director should have stuck to the genre he is comfortable in!". Mister Lee of Kalki wrote the screenplay goes smoothly till the break, then it stumbles and goes off the track, nothing much sticks in the mind including the climax. Indiainfo wrote, "Director Shakthi Chidambaram who had earlier given us comedy films like CHARLIE CHAPLIN, offers an okay thriller. KHADALA KIRUKKAN, remake of Hindi hit film, DEEWANGEE, solely relies on Parthiban's acting skills and his histrionics. He excels in the role of complex man too. But the film is not developed properly to suit the Tamil audiences except the introduction of comedy track done by Vadivelu". Deccan Herald wrote "The story is ‘adopted’ from the Hindi film Deewangee. The film moves at a good pace but once the suspense is out that Parthiban was only ‘acting’ as a man with dual personality, the film loses its momentum". Sify wrote "What can you say about this unbelievable yarn as the director’ attempts to make a thriller falls flat. Bits and shards have been taken from various films including Kamal’s Guna. Parthipan has gone overboard and hams. Richa Pallod is too cosmetic. Vineeth at last gets a meaty role as Gautham. Deva seems to be inspired by S.A.Rajkumar tunes! Don’t venture to see this Parthipan’s ego-trip".
