= Jolly O Gymkhana (film) =

Tamil film by Shakthi Chidambaram

- Theatrical release poster
- Directed by: Sakthi Chidambaram
- Written by: Sakthi Chidambaram
- Produced by: Rajendra M Rajan; Punitha Rajan
- Starring: Prabhu Deva; Madonna Sebastian
- Cinematography: MC Ganesh Chandra
- Edited by: Ramar
- Music by: Ashwin Vinayagamoorthy
- Production companies: Transindia Media; Entertainment Private Limited
- Release date: 22 November 2024
- Country: India
- Language: Tamil

Jolly O Gymkhana (transl. Let's be jolly together) is a 2024 Indian Tamil-language black comedy film written and directed by Sakthi Chidambaram, starring Prabhu Deva in the lead role, playing the role of a corpse, alongside Madonna Sebastian as the female lead. The film also stars Abhirami, Yogi Babu, Redin Kingsley, Robo Shankar, John Vijay, Sai Dheena, Madhusudhan Rao and Yashika Aannand in pivotal roles. The film is bankrolled by Rajendra M Rajan and Punitha Rajan for Transindia Media & Entertainment Private Limited. The film has music composed by Ashwin Vinayagamoorthy, editing by Ramar, and cinematography by MC Ganesh Chandra. The title is inspired by the song of the same name from Beast (2022).

Jolly O Gymkhana got released in theatres on 22 November 2024.

== Plot ==
The film commences with Bhavani seeking absolution from Father Martin Luther King at church. In Meignanapuram, Thangasamy, along with his daughter Chellamma and granddaughters Bhavani, Shivani, and Yazhini, manage the Vellaikkaran Biriyani Hotel. This establishment has now witnessed a decline in business since the construction of a new bypass road. To stay afloat, the family resorts to usury, borrowing money from Rocket Ravi. They receive a substantial order from Tenkasi MLA Adaikalaraj for a bulk feast catering worth ₹2 lakhs. Despite not receiving an advance payment, the family prepares the dishes, only to be met with humiliation and violence when they approach Adaikalaraj for payment. Thangasamy is beaten, leading to his hospitalization and a critical surgery costing ₹25 lakhs. Bhavani reaches out to Rocket Ravi, their money lender, for assistance.

Lawyer Poongundran takes on a case against MLA Adaikalaraj, who allegedly scammed 28 families by using their signatures to obtain medical insurance money for himself. One of the victims, Sandhya, a puppetry artist, speaks out against the scam but is murdered by Adaikalaraj, with Reporter Kanniga as a witness. Despite this, Adaikalaraj manages to escape both the money scam and murder charges. As the election approaches, Poongundran intercepts ₹10 crore meant for voter distribution by Adaikalaraj and creates a joint account with Kanniga at UBC Bank in Kodaikanal and also rescues Sandhya's family, settling them in his mansion. Adaikalaraj, enraged, hires contract killer Pottu Bhavani to kill Poongundran. However, his associates mistakenly send the contract-killer's fee to Bhavani, who uses it to pay for her grandfather's surgery. Adaikalaraj's men demand the ₹25 lakhs back, putting Bhavani and her family in a difficult spot. Meanwhile, Thangasamy also suggests that Bhavani meet lawyer Poongundran, who is currently in Theni. However, upon arrival, they are shocked to discover that Poongundran has been poisoned to death by Pottu Bhavani.

Faced with a predicament, as they have provided their contact information at the hotel reception and left fingerprints in the room, the four women disguise Poongundran's corpse as a drunken individual and successfully exit the hotel. With the assistance of Bhavani's uncle, Murugesan "Mappumama," they transport the corpse to a public gathering and abandon it there, unaware that Mappumama is oblivious to Poongundran's demise. A riot erupts at the gathering, and Inspector Idithangi, while attempting to disperse the crowd, assaults Poongundran's lifeless body. The incident goes viral, and results in the inspector's suspension, amidst widespread public outcry. Furthermore, the Chief Minister, mindful of the party's reputation, removes Adaikalaraj from his position as Health Minister and replaces him with Omapudi Narayanan. Mappumama, unaware of Poongundran's fate, returns the corpse to Bhavani's family. Initially, they plan to dispose of the body by pushing it off a cliff. However, a phone call from Kesavan Kutty, requesting Poongudran to withdraw the ₹10 crore from his account, prompts a change of heart.

The family devises a plan to manipulate the corpse, utilizing an artificial limb designed by Shivani, a robotics engineer. Bhavani provides a voice dub, while Yazhini practices forging Poongundran's signature. After overcoming numerous challenges, including confrontations with Pottu Bhavani, a Telugu-speaking thug, and Inspector Idithangi, the family successfully transports Poongundran's corpse to Kodaikanal via car and bus. Upon arrival, they meet the bank manager Kesavan Kutty, who insists on obtaining Kanniga's signature, as the account is jointly held. Kanniga, who has also arrived in Kodaikanal, discovers Bhavani and confronts her, revealing the truth about the ₹10 crore. With a change of heart, Kanniga and Bhavani join forces to withdraw the money.

They are pursued by Adaikalaraj, Pottu Bhavani, Inspector Idithangi, and their accomplices. The group becomes trapped in Poongundran's mansion, where the four women using Poongundran's corpse, create a diversion, making it appear as though the dead body is fighting off the attackers. Kesavan Kutty witnesses the chaos and mistakenly believes that Adaikalaraj has killed Poongundran. Convinced of this, Kesavan Kutty agrees to release the funds from Poongundran's account. The corpse is then given a proper burial, and the family finds solace in fulfilling Poongundran's last wish.

The film concludes with Bhavani seeking forgiveness from the church father for utilizing Poongundran's corpse for their benefit.

== Cast ==
- Prabhu Deva as Lawyer Poongundran
- Madonna Sebastian as Bhavani
- Abhirami as Chellamma
- Yogi Babu as Father Martin Luther King
- Redin Kingsley as a bus conductor
- Y. G. Mahendran as Thangasamy
- Robo Shankar as Adaikalaraj's henchman
- John Vijay as Idithangi, Inspector
- Sai Dheena as Pottu Bhavani
- Raghu Babu as a Telugu-speaking thug
- Pujita Ponnada as Kanniga, a reporter
- Aadukalam Naren as Adaikalaraj's lawyer
- Madhusudhan Rao as Adaikalaraj, MLA
- M. S. Bhaskar as Kodangi I.P.S., Commissioner
- Nanjil Sampath as Chief Minister
- Chaams as Manager's assistant
- Kalloori Vinoth as Adaikalaraj's henchman
- Ashwanth Ashokkumar as a Church assistant
- Suresh Chakravarthi as Rocket Ravi
- Shiva Aravind as Murugesan "Mappumama"
- Senthi Kumari as Sandhya, puppetry artist
- Aadhavan as LIC Agent Dhandapani
- TSR Srinivasan as a train ticket examiner
- Rahul Thatha as a customer in bank
- KPY Kothandam as Omapudi Narayanan
- Aaditya Kathir as a constable
- Sakthi Chidambaram as Kesavan Kutty, bank manager (cameo appearance)
- Yashika Aannand in the song "Oosi Rosy" (cameo appearance)

== Production ==
=== Development ===
In early November 2023, it was reported that director Sakthi Chidambaram would be joining hands with Prabhu Deva for the third time after Charlie Chaplin (2002) and Charlie Chaplin 2 (2019) in their upcoming project. The director further revealed that Prabhu Deva would essay a role of a corpse for most part of the film. The film also features Madonna Sebastian and Abhirami playing the role of her mother, making her second collaboration after Charlie Chaplin with Sakthi Chidambaram and Prabhu Deva after 22 years. The film also stars Yogi Babu, Redin Kingsley, Robo Shankar, John Vijay, M.S Bhaskar, Sai Dheena, Pujita Ponnada, Aadukalam Naren, Madhusudhan Rao and Yashika Aannand in pivotal roles. In mid-December, the title of the film was revealed as Jolly O Gymkhana, a callback to the song by the same name composed by Anirudh Ravichander and sung by Vijay from the film Beast (2022). The film is bankrolled by Rajendra M Rajan and Punitha Rajan for Transindia Media & Entertainment Private Limited. The film has music composed by Ashwin Vinayagamoorthy, editing by Ramar, and cinematography by MC Ganesh Chandra.

=== Filming ===
Principal photography predominantly took place around Tenkasi, Kodaikanal, Chennai, and Puducherry. On 6 November 2023, Chidambaram revealed that the entire filming has been wrapped up the previous week and the film is in the post-production stage.

== Music ==
Jolly O Gymkhana

Soundtrack album by Ashwin Vinayagamoorthy
- Genre: Feature film soundtrack
- Length: 21:08
- Language: Tamil
- Label: Zee Music South
- Producer: Ashwin Vinayagamoorthy

Ashwin Vinayagamoorthy chronology
Jigiri Dosthu (2023)	Jolly O Gymkhana (2024)	Indian Penal Law (2025)

Singles from Jolly O Gymkhana
- 1. "Police Kaarana Kattikitta" Released: 26 October 2024; 2. "Oosi Rosy" Released: 12 November 2024

The soundtrack and background is composed by Ashwin Vinayagamoorthy. The first single "Police Kaarana Kattikitta" sung by actor-singer Andrea Jeremiah was released on 26 October 2024. The second single "Oosi Rosy" was released on 12 November 2024 by Arya and Priya Anand.

Track Listing
No.	Title	Lyrics	Singer(s)	Length
1.	"Oosi Rosy"	M Jegan Kaviraj, Sakthi Chidambaram	G. V. Prakash Kumar	4:08
2.	"Police Kaarana Kattikitta"	M Jegan Kaviraj, Sakthi Chidambaram	Andrea Jeremiah	3:35
3.	"Kalangadhey"	M Jegan Kaviraj, Sakthi Chidambaram	Sreekanth Hariharan	3:40
4.	"Vellaikaaran Biryani"	M Jegan Kaviraj, Sakthi Chidambaram	Mathichiyam Bala	1:58
5.	"Doi"	M Jegan Kaviraj, Sakthi Chidambaram	V. M. Mahalingam	1:46
6.	"Oru Body Naalu Lady"	M Jegan Kaviraj, Sakthi Chidambaram, Aakash V	Ashwin Vinayagamoorthy	3:26
7.	"Irukaan Aana Illa"	M Jegan Kaviraj, Sakthi Chidambaram	S. Chinnaponnu	2:35
Total length:				21:08

== Controversy ==
The filmmakers hosted a press conference to discuss its production. Shakthi Chidhambaram attended and provided details about the film but did not explain the change in lyricist credits. When reporters asked about the issue, an argument ensued, and Shakthi refused to answer, eventually leaving the conference abruptly. Jagan Kaviraj claimed that his removal was due to a production-related issue. He stated that the film's budget had increased beyond the initial plan. Meanwhile, the director told News18 that Kaviraj was supposed to write the song, but Shakthi decided to write it himself after being dissatisfied with the output.

== Release ==
=== Theatrical ===
Jolly O Gymkhana got released in theatres on 22 November 2024.

=== Home media ===
Jolly O Gymkhana began streaming on Aha from 30 December 2024.

== Reception ==
=== Critical response ===
Roopa Radhakrishnan of Times of India gave 1.5/5 stars and wrote "Jolly O Gymkhana shows that just having women as central characters in a film doesn't make one a pro-woman movie. A series of utterly senseless and outright vulgar jokes don't help its case." Avinash Ramachandran of The Indian Express wrote "Jolly O Gymkhana could have been something interesting and definitely more funny, but when the makers resort to the easiest pickings, feeling bad about the could-haves or revolting on what was included is just a fool’s errand." Prashanth Vallavan of Cinema Express wrote "With the botched execution of Jolly O Gymkhana, it is obvious that Sakthi Chidambaram has erroneously believed that an insincere effort was the right attitude to make a lighthearted comedy."
