= Sangamam (1999 film) =

- DVD cover
- Directed by: Suresh Krissna
- Written by: E. Ramdoss; Gopu-Babu (Dialogues)
- Screenplay by: Suresh Krissna
- Story by: Bhoopathy Raja
- Produced by: Pyramid Natarajan
- Starring: Rahman; Vindhya
- Cinematography: S. Saravanan
- Edited by: Suresh Urs
- Music by: A. R. Rahman
- Production company: Pyramid Films International
- Release date: 16 July 1999
- Running time: 153 minutes
- Country: India
- Language: Tamil

Sangamam (transl. Confluence) is a 1999 Indian Tamil-language romantic musical dance film co written and directed by Suresh Krissna and produced by V. Natarajan of Pyramid Films. The film stars Rahman and newcomer Vindhya, with Manivannan, Vijayakumar, Radha Ravi, and Vadivelu playing supporting roles. The film's music was composed by A. R. Rahman, while S. Saravanan handled the cinematography. The film was released on 16 July 1999 and became a financial failure, but won the National Film Award for Best Lyrics (Vairamuthu) and four Tamil Nadu State Film Awards.

== Plot ==
This film depicts the disputes between two forms of the dance styles and music, Classical Indian (in particular Carnatic music and Bharathanatyam danceform) against rural Tamil folk music and dance. The film depicts the misunderstanding and mutual ignorance of the two factions. The parallel plot in the movie is of the children and intended successors of the respective dance doyens falling in love with each other. After initial disagreements, a classical dancer and a rural folk artist charm each other and fall in love. However, they face issues when the girl's father disapproves of their relationship.

== Cast ==
- Rahman as Selvam
- Vindhya as Abhirami
- Manivannan as Aavudapillai
- Vijayakumar as Sivasankaramoorthy
- Radha Ravi as Nagaraj
- Vadivelu as Haridas
- Delhi Ganesh as Abhirami's uncle
- Charle as Shanmugam
- Srividya as Sivagami
- S. N. Lakshmi as Meenakhi alias Meenu
- Lavanya as Selvam's sister
- Thyagu as Selvam's friend
- Vennira Aadai Moorthy as Narayana
- Kavithalaya Krishnan as Abhirami's uncle
- Madhan Bob as an instrument vendor
- Kumar Natarajan
- Soori in an uncredited role

== Production ==
V. Natarajan launched a film to be directed by Suresh Krissna and A. R. Rahman was signed on to compose the music for the film in early 1998, while he was also working with the producer Pyramid Natarajan in Rhythm and Udhaya. In an interview in August 1998, Rahman revealed that he was working on "a very small budget movie called Sangamam which is based on classical and folk dance". The film would feature his co-brother, actor Rahman in the lead role with newcomer Vindhya playing the lead female role.

During production it was reported that the film would be a remake of the 1968 film Thillana Mohanambal, but this was subsequently found to be untrue. The film was briefly delayed in 1999 as A. R. Rahman was too busy to complete the background score for the film, with Natarajan initially refusing to pay him, causing further delays for the producer's next venture, Rhythm.

== Soundtrack ==
The music was composed by A. R. Rahman, with lyrics by Vairamuthu. The album marked the first collaboration between the veteran musician M. S. Viswanathan and A. R. Rahman. The song "Mudhal Murai Killipparthaein" is set in Bihag raga.

Track listing
No.	Title	Singer(s)	Length
1.	"Mazhai Thulli"	Hariharan, M. S. Viswanathan	6:49
2.	"Varaha Nadhikarai"	Shankar Mahadevan	6:17
3.	"Sowkiyama Kannae"	Nithyashree Mahadevan	5:55
4.	"Mudhal Murai Killi Parthen"	Srinivas, Sujatha Mohan	6:10
5.	"Margazhi Thingal Allava"	S. Janaki, P. Unnikrishnan, Srimathumitha	6:57
6.	"Aalaala Kanda"	Hariharan, M. S. Viswanathan	2:19
Total length:			34:30

== Release ==
Sangamam was released on 16 July 1999. The film was also set to be dubbed and released in Telugu under the same name, but the financial losses suffered had deterred the version. Due to the film's failure, Sun TV, who bought the satellite rights of the film, premiered it in September 1999.

=== Critical reception ===
R. Ananthanarayanan wrote for pvv.ntnu.no that "Sangamam is a credible movie with good music by A. R. Rahman and superlative performance by Manivannan". Ananthanarayanan added that "Rahman does justice to his role and has brought a certain dignity and understatement to his character" but that "Vindhya, the heroine is the only weak link". K. N. Vijiyan of New Straits Times wrote "You should see this movie if you like A. R. Rahman's music. It makes for a pleasant viewing". Kala Krishnan Ramesh of Deccan Herald praised the acting, music, editing and dialogues. K. P. S. of Kalki wrote the film's story was reminiscent of the films Karakattakkaran and Thillana Mohanambal, the screenplay is like a town bus that stops and moves at every stop, and Sangamam, which should be properly positioned to push the two together, is half-positioned.

D. S. Ramanujam of The Hindu wrote, "THE FOCUS is more on the fusion of two hearts than the two arts in question – Bharatanatyam and one form of folk dance, other varieties not getting their due – in Pyramid Films' Sangamam. The surprise element is the performance of Manivannan, no humour dipped snide remarks but enjoyable emotional stuff, a rare portrayal by this seasoned actor-director". A critic from Sify wrote that "Rahman dancing folk art is unbearable but his acting is good in emotional scenes. Vindya has nothing much in her debutante role except to look pretty. Manivannan steals the show with his dramatic performance as a folk art exponent. AR Rahman`s music is the only highlight of the film. His background music is good and folk art music art is catchy. Credit also goes to Vairamuthu for his lyrics. Its always better to buy an audio cassette and forget the movie".

=== Accolades ===
Event	Category	Awardee	Ref.
47th National Film Awards	Best Lyrics	Vairamuthu (for "Mudhal Murai Killipparthaein")	
Dinakaran Cinema Awards	Best Female Playback Singer	S. Janaki	
Tamil Nadu State Film Awards	Best Music Director	A. R. Rahman	
Tamil Nadu State Film Awards	Best Lyrics	Vairamuthu	
Tamil Nadu State Film Awards	Best Female Playback Singer	S. Janaki (for "Margazhi Thingal Allava")	
Tamil Nadu State Film Awards	Best Art Director	Krishnamurthy	
