= Pathavi Pramanam =

- Theatrical release poster
- Directed by: K. R. Udayasankar
- Screenplay by: K. R. Udayasankar
- Story by: C. Dhinakaran
- Produced by: Mohan Natarajan; V. Shanmugam
- Starring: Vijayakanth; Vineetha; Keerthana
- Cinematography: Utpal V Nayanar
- Edited by: M. Ramamoorthy
- Music by: Deva
- Production company: Sree Rajakaali Amman Enterprises
- Release date: 10 June 1994
- Running time: 130 minutes
- Country: India
- Language: Tamil

Pathavi Pramanam (transl. Office Oath) is a 1994 Indian Tamil-language political satire film directed by K. R. Udayasankar in his debut. The film stars Vijayakanth, Vineetha, and Keerthana. It was released on 10 June 1994.

== Plot ==
The film begins with Siva escaping from jail, as a convict who failed to kill the politician R. K. twice. At the transfer of power, R. K. will take oath as the new chief minister of Tamil Nadu, so he deploys heavy security to protect him from Siva. Before that, Siva manages to kidnap R. K. and hauls him to a television station. Siva tells his past to the audience and the reason behind the kidnapping.

== Cast ==
- Vijayakanth as Siva
- Vineetha as Krishnaveni
- Ramesh Aravind as Selvamani (guest appearance)
- Keerthana as Seetha Lakshmi
- Rajan P. Dev as R. K. (Rajakumar)
- Mohan Natarajan as Mahadevan
- Vennira Aadai Moorthy
- Kovai Sarala
- Kumarimuthu
- Chitti as Police inspector
- Priya
- Sempuli Jagan
- R. N. K. Prasad as President of India
- Mohan V. Ram as Governor of Tamil Nadu
- Shari
- Raviraj
- King Kong
- Rani in a special appearance

== Soundtrack ==
The music was composed by Deva.

Song	Singer(s)	Lyrics	Duration
"Ore Oru Pattu Kaanamal"	S. P. Balasubrahmanyam	Piraisoodan	5:09
"Ore Oru Pattu Naan Paada"	K. S. Chithra	Piraisoodan	4:27
"Poo Mudithu Pottu Vachu"	Krishnaraj	Piraisoodan	4:21
"Thulli Thulli Thudikuthu Manasu"	Mano, K. S. Chithra	Kamakodiyan	4:26
"Vetri Kottai Nayagare"	Mano, K. S. Chithra	Kamakodiyan	4:35

== Reception ==
K. Vijiyan of New Straits Times labelled the film as "fast-paced political tale", and Malini Mannath of The Indian Express described the film as "a fairly engrossing entertainer despite its flaws". R. P. R. of Kalki noted down that the story is similar to old films of Vijayakanth and the dialogues reminds of television serials while calling climax as a good joke. He however found Mohan Natarajan as the only likeable character from the entire film and concluded that since director Udayashankar is a debutant from D. F. T., he is spared with sympathy. The film failed at the box office.
