= Kovai Sarala =

Indian actress

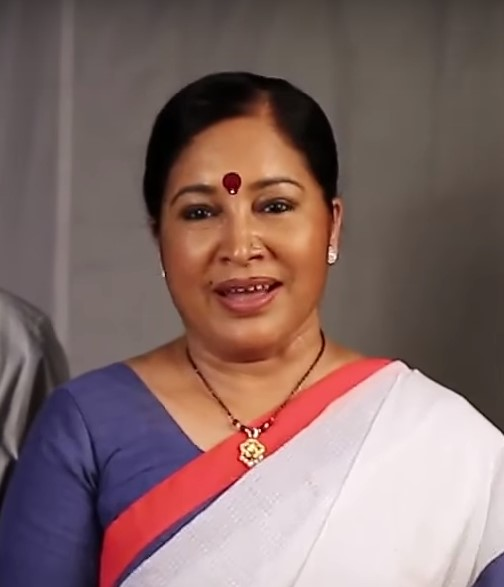
- Sarala in 2016
- Born: Sarala; Coimbatore, Tamil Nadu, India
- Occupations: Comedian; Actress; Television presenter; Politician; Singer
- Years active: 1979-present
- Political party: Makkal Needhi Maiam

Kovai Sarala is an Indian actress, comedian and singer, who plays supporting roles in Tamil, Telugu, Malayalam and Kannada films. She has won the Tamil Nadu State Film Award for Best Comedian three times, for her performances in Sathi Leelavathi (1995), Poovellam Un Vaasam (2001) and Uliyin Osai (2008).

She has also won two Nandi Awards for Best Female Comedian also the Vijay Award and IIFA Award for Best Comedian for her performance in Kanchana (2011).

She is now part of Kamal Haasan's Makkal Needhi Maiam Party.

== Early and present life ==
Kovai Sarala was born in Coimbatore, Madras State in a Malayali family. She developed interest in acting after watching MGR's films. She completed her studies and entered the film industry with the support of her sister and father.

She got her first film offer when she was in the 9th standard and acted with Vijayakumar and K. R. Vijaya in the film Velli Ratham(1979) and did a supporting role in Malayalam movie Thaliritta Kinakkal (1980).

She completed Class 10 and joined theatre did stage shows for few years, later she played a 32-year-old pregnant woman Mundhanai Mudichu, her second Tamil film. Two years later she acted in Chinna Veedu, where she played the 65-year-old mother of Bhagyaraj's character. She has appeared in more than 300+ films in Tamil, Telugu, Malayalam and Kannada. She has mentioned the films Karakattakkaran (1989), Varavu Ettana Selavu Pathana (1994), Sathi Leelavathi (1995), Viralukketha Veekkam (1999) and Viswanathan Ramamoorthy (2001) as her personal favourites.

She has acted with all the top comedians including Vadivelu, Brahmanandam, Goundamani, Senthil and Vivek. Her comedy tracks with Vadivelu and Brahmanandam have been especially popular.

She has also worked in television series and television shows. She has hosted the reality show Paasa Paravaigal. She was a regular judge on the comedy show Varuthapadatha Valibar Sangam that aired on Zee Tamil. She also hosted the kids game show Chellame Chellam on Sun TV.

== Personal life ==
Sarala is unmarried. she has stated that she chose not to marry due to family responsibilities and her commitment to supporting her siblings and their children. She considers her relatives children as her own and has been actively involved in their upbringing.

== Filmography ==
Key
†	Denotes films that have not yet been released

=== Tamil ===
List of Kovai Sarala Tamil film credits
Year	Title	Role	Notes	Ref.
1979	Velli Ratham			
1983	Mundhanai Mudichu	Arukkani		
1984	Vaidehi Kathirunthal			
1984	Thambikku Entha Ooru			
1984	Mannukketha Ponnu			
1984	Nooravathu Naal	Manju		
1985	Naan Sigappu Manithan	Saradha		
1985	Anbin Mugavari			
1985	Uyarndha Ullam			
1985	Engal Kural			
1985	Chinna Veedu	Madanagopal's mother		
1985	Japanil Kalyanaraman	Muppatha		
1985	Udaya Geetham	Police officer's daughter		
1986	Marakka Matten			
1986	Yaaro Ezhuthiya Kavithai			
1986	Uyire Unakkaga	The shoemaker's girlfriend		
1986	Enakku Nane Needipathi	Police Constable Kannamma		
1986	Vasantha Raagam	Devi		
1986	Lakshmi Vandhachu	Valli		
1986	Mannukkul Vairam			
1987	Kadhal Parisu	Kanmani		
1987	Kizhakku Africavil Sheela	Chikki Mukki		
1987	Velicham			
1987	Solvathellam Unmai	Geetha		
1987	Ananda Aradhanai			
1987	Ini Oru Sudhanthiram			
1987	Per Sollum Pillai			
1987	Chinna Kuyil Paaduthu		Cameo appearance	
1987	Ninaive Oru Sangeetham	Gundulingam's wife		
1987	Chellakutti			
1987	Uzhavan Magan	Accountant's daughter		
1987	Aayusu Nooru	Chellamma		
1988	Melam Kottu Thali Kattu			
1988	Thambi Thanga Kambi			
1988	Soora Samhaaram			
1988	Enga Ooru Kavalkaran			
1988	Valaikaapu			
1988	Poovukkul Boogambam			
1989	Vettaiyaadu Vilaiyaadu			
1989	Raja Chinna Roja	Maid		
1989	Moodu Manthiram			
1989	Thangamana Purushan			
1989	Valathu Kalai Vaithu Vaa			
1989	Thaaya Thaarama			
1989	Yogam Raja Yogam			
1989	Solaikuyil	Punitha		
1989	Paandi Nattu Thangam	Venkatasubbama		
1989	Karagattakaran	Female dancer		
1989	Enga Ooru Mappillai	Chandra		
1989	Thangamani Rangamani	Lakshmi		
1989	Enga Veettu Deivam			
1989	Kai Veesamma Kai Veesu			
1989	Raaja Raajathan			
1989	Dharmam Vellum	Jimmy		
1989	Ponnu Pakka Poren			
1990	Jagathalaprathapan			
1990	Maruthu Pandi			
1990	Pattanamthan Pogalamadi			
1990	Adhisaya Manithan	Urmila		
1990	My Dear Marthandan	Maharani		
1990	Sathan Sollai Thattathe	Chitra's mother		
1990	En Kadhal Kanmani	Lilly		
1990	Erikkarai Poonkatrey			
1990	Valiba Vizhayattu			
1990	Thai Maasam Poovaasam			
1991	Pondatti Sonna Kettukanum	Thangam		
1991	Pondatti Pondattithan	Janaki		
1991	Pudhiya Raagam	Bulbul		
1991	Chithirai Pookkal	Bharathi's mother		
1991	Mahamayi			
1992	Chinnavar	Sevattamma		
1992	Therku Theru Machan			
1992	Ponnuketha Purushan			
1992	Pondatti Rajyam			
1992	Thirumathi Palanisamy	School Teacher		
1992	Thilagam			
1993	Dhuruva Natchathiram			
1994	Sethupathi IPS			
1994	Vaanga Partner Vaanga	Pawn		
1994	Varavu Ettana Selavu Pathana	Elisabeth		
1994	Pathavi Pramanam			
1994	Pavithra	Thenmozhi		
1994	Nammavar	Julie		
1995	Sathi Leelavathi	Palaniammal Sakthivel Gounder		
1995	Rani Maharani			
1996	Vasantha Vaasal	Velu's wife		
1996	Vasantham	Police Constable		
1996	Kaalam Maari Pochu	Sundari		
1997	Gopura Deepam			
1997	Kaalamellam Kadhal Vaazhga	Elizabeth		
1997	Pasamulla Pandiyare			
1997	Nattupura Nayagan	Pavalakkodi		
1997	Nalla Manasukkaran			
1998	Udhavikku Varalaamaa	Mythili's mother		
1998	Kaathala Kaathala	Junior Vikadanantha's wife		
1998	Vettu Onnu Thundu Rendu			
1998	Aval Varuvala	Savithri		
1998	Unnudan	Thayamma		
1999	Kanave Kalaiyadhe	Kayal Vizhi		
1999	Anantha Poongathe	Saradha		
1999	Kannodu Kanbathellam	Akhila's mother		
1999	Nesam Pudhusu			
1999	Poovellam Kettuppar	Dr. Bala Thirupurasundari		
1999	Thirupathi Ezhumalai Venkatesa	Lalitha		
1999	Viralukketha Veekkam	Ranjitham		
1999	Minsara Kanna	Flower seller		
1999	Paattali	Sarala		
1999	Pudhu Kudithanam	Sarasu		
1999	Manaivikku Mariyadhai			
2000	Kandha Kadamba Kathir Vela	Ragini		
2000	Magalirkkaga	Constable Rosa		
2000	Koodi Vazhnthal Kodi Nanmai	Kanagavalli		
2000	Doubles	Meena's mother		
2000	Maayi	Rakayi		
2000	Unnai Kann Theduthey			
2000	Budget Padmanabhan	Padmanabhan's cousin		
2000	Uyirile Kalanthathu			
2001	Nageswari	Manisha Koirala		
2001	Krishna Krishna	Kaveri		
2001	Mitta Miraasu	Bhagyam		
2001	Poovellam Un Vasam	Kanniga		
2001	Piriyadha Varam Vendum	Kannatha		
2001	Shakalaka Baby	Aaravalli		
2001	Viswanathan Ramamoorthy	Andal		
2001	Veettoda Mappillai	Rani		
2001	Vadagupatti Maapillai	Anjala		
2001	Shahjahan	Jingili		
2002	Ennamma Kannu	Simran		
2002	Thenkasi Pattanam	Kamala		
2002	En Mana Vaanil	Parvathi		
2002	Panchathantiram	Bharathi's wife		
2004	Vaanam Vasappadum	Lakshmi		
2005	Priyasakhi	Head Constable Kausalya Raman		
2005	Mumbai Xpress	Avinasi's sister		
2006	Kovai Brothers	Tenthara, Foursha and Bisin		
2007	Muni	Kannamma		
2008	Uliyin Osai	Sokki		
2011	Muni 2: Kanchana	Sarala		
2012	Oru Nadigaiyin Vaakkumoolam	Papi		
2012	Paagan	Amutha		
2013	Kanna Laddu Thinna Aasaiya	Sowmiya's aunt		
2013	Thillu Mullu	Senthamarai		
2013	Arya Surya	Chandralekha		
2013	Ragalaipuram	Head Constable Ekavalli		
2013	Chithirayil Nilachoru			
2014	Malini 22 Palayamkottai	Sarala		
2014	Pani Vizhum Nilavu			
2014	Vanavarayan Vallavarayan	Vanavarayan & Vallavarayan's mother		
2014	Sigaram Thodu	Aishwarya		
2014	Aranmanai	Eshwari		
2014	Rettai Vaalu			
2014	Pagadai Pagadai	Anbukkarasi		
2015	Komban	Kottaiamma		
2015	Kanchana 2	Raghava's mother		
2015	Adhibar	Kumari		
2015	Vedalam	Maalu		
2016	Aranmanai 2	Komalam		
2016	Nayaki	Saradha		
2016	Uchathula Shiva	Shiva's mother	Voice role	
2016	Thiraikku Varadha Kathai	Komalam		
2016	Kadavul Irukaan Kumaru	Shanti		
2016	Balle Vellaiyathevaa	Kathai		
2017	Motta Shiva Ketta Shiva	Vaijayanthi		
2017	Sangili Bungili Kadhava Thorae	E. B. Rajeshwari		
2017	Anbanavan Asaradhavan Adangadhavan	Sarala		
2017	Sathura Adi 3500			
2017	Bayama Irukku	Devil Devi		
2017	Mersal	Sarala		
2018	Semma	Mandhaarai		
2018	Itly	Twinkle		
2018	Kasu Mela Kasu	Myna's mother		
2018	Lakshmi	A. Saraswathi		
2018	Utharavu Maharaja			
2019	Viswasam	Philomeena		
2019	Kanchana 3	Raghava's mother		
2019	Devi 2	Lalitha		
2021	Michaelpatty Raja	Raja's mother		
2021	Pei Mama	Serupadi Sitharamma		
2022	One Way			
2022	Sembi	Veerathayi		
2023	Ithu Kadhaiyalla Nijam			
2023	Kick	Pushpa		
2024	Double Tuckerr	Shanmugavalli		
2024	Aranmanai 4	Saravanan and Selvi's aunt	Also partially reshot in Telugu	
2024	Kanguva	Francis' mother		
2025	Maareesan	Assistant Commissioner Fareeda		
2026	Lucky the Superstar	Sarala	Voice role	
2026	Nooru Kodi Vaanavil			

=== Telugu ===
List of Kovai Sarala Telugu film credits
Year	Title	Role	Notes	Ref.
1987	Veera Prathap			
1991	Amma Kadupu Challanga			
1992	Pellam Chepithe Vinnali			
1993	Pellama Majaka			
1994	Kunti Putrudu			
1994	Bhairava Dweepam	Allari Deyyam		
1994	Hello Alludu			
1995	Aasthi Mooredu Aasa Baaredu			
1995	God Father			
1995	Lingababu Love Story	Bank Manager Ambhujam		
1996	Family	Kasthuri		
1996	Akkada Ammayi Ikkada Abbayi	Julie		
1997	Pelli	Meena		
1997	Mama Bagunnava	Sundarambal Iyer		
1998	Suprabhatam	Chukkamma		
1998	Navvulata	Nurse		
1999	Vaare Vah Moguda			
2000	Kshemamga Velli Labamgarandi	Subbalakshmi		
2000	Rayalaseema Ramanna Chowdary	Venkamma		
2000	Nuvve Kavali	Rukku		
2000	Tirumala Tirupati Venkatesa	Lalitha		
2000	Madhuri			
2001	Mrugaraju			
2001	Akka Bavaekada	Mangamma		
2001	Simharasi			
2001	Ramma Chilakamma	Simran, Simhu Darling	Dual roles	
2001	Athanu			
2001	Hanuman Junction	Sangeetha's aunt		
2002	Entha Bagundo			
2002	Maa Alludu Very Good	A. V. Rao's mother		
2002	Sandade Sandadi	Fitting Parvathi		
2002	O Chinadana	Veena Tantula Meera Bai		
2003	Fools	Manga		
2003	Ottesi Cheputunna			
2003	Ela Cheppanu	Sarala		
2003	Ori Nee Prema Bangaram Kaanu			
2003	Sriramachandrulu	Savitri		
2003	Tiger Harischandra Prasad	Pawan Kalyan (in male getup)		
2004	Mee Intikoste Em Istaaru Maa Intkoste Em Testaaru			
2004	Andaru Dongale Dorikite	Chi. La. Sow. Suryakantham		
2004	Vidyardhi			
2005	Mahanandi	Chilakamma		
2005	Evadi Gola Vaadidhi	Leela Rani		
2005	Veerabhadra	Colony resident		
2006	Naidu LLB			
2006	Iddaru Attala Muddula Alludu	Sarala		
2006	Style	Ganesh's neighbour		
2006	Raam			
2006	Rajababu	Lakshmi		
2006	Aadivaram Aadavallaku Selavu	Ramulamma		
2006	Bhagyalakshmi Bumper Draw	Mary Gotham		
2006	Pellaina Kothalo			
2007	Pagale Vennela	Sarala		
2007	Desamuduru	Shivani		
2007	Maharathi	Saralamma		
2007	Seema Sastri			
2008	Nee Sukhame Ne Koruthunna			
2008	Sawaal			
2008	Bommana Brothers Chandana Sisters	Bommana brothers' mother		
2008	Michael Madana Kamaraju	Michael's fake mother		
2008	Mallepuvvu	Construction site worker		
2008	Hero	Sarala		
2008	Dongala Bandi	Aishwarya's sister		
2008	Neninthe	Urmila		
2009	Bumper Offer	Ramanamma		
2009	Evaraina Epudaina	Nurse		
2009	A Aa E Ee			
2010	Kothimooka	Jambu		
2010	Puli	Inspector Madhumati		
2011	Katha Screenplay Darsakatvam Appalaraju			
2011	Badrinath	Badrinath's mother		
2012	Devasthanam	Sridevi		
2012	Nuvva Nena	Pushpa		
2012	Rebel	Nandini's aunt		
2012	Devudu Chesina Manashulu	Lakshmi		
2012	Sudigadu	Kamesh's Mother / Don D		
2013	Masala	Anjali Devi / Chintamani		
2013	Greeku Veerudu	Mahalakshmi		
2015	Temper	Shanvi's mother		
2015	Kick 2	Darling		
2016	Nayaki	Saradha		
2016	Ghatana	Sarala		
2019	Abhinetri 2	Lalitha		
2025	Champion	Andrea		
2026	Seetha Payanam			

=== Malayalam ===
List of Kovai Sarala Malayalam film credits
Year	Title	Role	Ref.
1997	Poomarathanalil	Ambujakshan's wife	
1999	Niram	Rukku	
2004	Kerala House Udan Vilpanakku	Parvathi Ammal	
2005	Hai		
2012	Maad Dad	Dawini D'Zosa	
2016	Girls	Komalam	

=== Kannada ===
List of Kovai Sarala Kannada film credits
Year	Title	Role	Notes
1986	Africadalli Sheela	Chikki Mukki	credited as Sarala
1993	Hendthi Helidare Kelabeku	Sarala	
1993	Alimayya	Anantha's mother	
2002	Naanu Naane		
2008	Arjun	Surya's wife	

=== Singer ===
- Marugo Marugo (Sathi Leelavathi) (1995)
- Thekkathi Mappillai (Magalirkkaga) (2000)
- Rama Rama (Villu) (2009)
- Iravinil Aattam (Kadavul Irukaan Kumaru) (2016)

=== Television ===
1. Sundari Soundari (Sun TV)
2. Ellame Siripputhan (Kalaignar TV)
3. Vanthaana Thanthaana (Kalaignar TV)
4. Sabhash Meera (Jaya TV)
5. Sagalakala Sarala (Vijay TV)
6. Comedyil Kalakkuvathu Eppadi (Vijay TV)
7. Vantintlo Wonders (Gemini TV)
8. Varuthapadatha Valibar Sangam (Zee Tamil)
9. Chellame Chellam (Sun TV)
10. Arundhathi (Sun TV)
11. Kutty Chutties (Sun TV)
12. Kalakka Povathu Yaaru? – (Seasons 1–5,8–9 (Star Vijay) – Judge
13. Devika & Danny (JioHotstar)

== Awards and nominations ==
=== Awards ===
Tamil Nadu State Film Awards

- Best Comedian – Sathi Leelavathi (1995)
- Best Comedian – Poovellam Un Vasam (2001)
- Best Comedian – Uliyin Osai (2008)

Vijay Awards

- Vijay Award for Best Comedian – Kanchana (2011)

Nandi Awards

- Best Female Comedian – Rayalaseema Ramanna Chowdary (2000)
- Best Female Comedian – Ori Nee Prema Bangaram Kaanu (2003)

=== Nominations ===
- 60th Filmfare Awards South – Best Supporting Actress – Telugu – Sudigadu (2012)
