= Viswanathan Ramamoorthy (film) =

2001 film

- Title card
- Directed by: Rama Narayanan
- Written by: Rama Narayanan
- Produced by: N. Radha
- Starring: Ramki; Vivek; Roja; Vindhya; Kovai Sarala
- Cinematography: N. K. Viswanathan
- Edited by: Rajkeerthi
- Music by: S. A. Rajkumar
- Production company: Sri Thenandal Films
- Release date: 10 August 2001
- Running time: 130 minutes
- Country: India
- Language: Tamil

Viswanathan Ramamoorthy is a 2001 Indian Tamil language comedy film written and directed by Rama Narayanan. The film stars Ramki, Vivek, Roja, Vindhya, and Kovai Sarala. It was released on 10 August 2001. The film is inspired by the 1970 Tamil film Veettuku Veedu which was based on Chithralaya Gopu's play Thikku Theriyatha Veettil which in turn was an adaptation of the English comedy play Right Bed Wrong Husband. The film's title pays homage to the composer duo Viswanathan–Ramamoorthy.

== Plot ==
Viswanathan is the timid husband of Meena, a small-time artist. Viswanathan’s friend Ramamoorthy, along with his wife Shenbagam, go from their village to Chennai with the hopes of becoming a movie director. Ramamoorthy and Shenbagam stay in Viswanathan’s home. While Meena is away for a few days for shooting, Viswanathan discovers that his uncle has died with a will of Rs. 30 lakhs written in favour of Viswanathan. However, there is a check in the will that the money should be granted to Viswanathan only if Meena behaves well with Viswanathan. There comes Kathavarayan, Viswanathan’s uncle’s manager (who is in charge of the money) and his daughter Andal. As Meena is away for shooting, Ramamoorthy comes up with a plan. Ramamoorthy requests Shenbagam to act as Meena in front of Kathavarayan, so that he develops confidence and hands over the money. Meanwhile, Andal gets attracted towards Ramamoorthy, believing him to be the man who comes in her dreams often. Meena is cheated by her manager and is in financial distress. She gets back to her home and is shocked to see Shenbagam acting as her. However, Meena agrees for the plan as she is also in need of money. After many funny incidents, Kathavarayan gives the money to Viswanathan as Meena has transformed into a caring wife now. Andal comes to her memory which she had lost long ago when she had gone to a temple feast with Kathavarayan. Viswanathan also decides to produce a movie to be directed by Ramamoorthy as a token of thanks.

== Cast ==
- Ramki as Viswanathan
- Vivek as Ramamoorthy
- Roja as Meena
- Vindhya as Shenbagam
- Kovai Sarala as Andal
- Vennira Aadai Moorthy as Kathavarayan, Andal's father
- R. Sundarrajan as Ramamoorthy's father
- Kumarimuthu as a film producer
- M.R.K as Viswanathan's uncle
- Idichapuli Selvaraj as Restaurant Owner
- Mayilsamy as Sukumar
- Kalidoss as Loan Shark
- Master Mahendran as Mahendran
- Telephone Mani as Police Constable
- Kottai Perumal
- Vijayakanth as Himself (cameo appearance)

== Production ==
The film was shot at Chennai and Karaikudi.

== Soundtrack ==
The music was composed by S. A. Rajkumar, with lyrics written by Pa. Vijay, Snehan and Rama. Narayanan.

Track listing
No.	Title	Singer(s)	Length
1.	"Vairathil Mazhai"	Anuradha Sriram
2.	"Thirupathi Malaikku"	Nithyasree Mahadevan
3.	"Naan Superstar"	Sujatha
4.	"Hey Rama"	Srinivas, Supraja
5.	"Cinema Cinema"	Deva

== Reception ==
Tamil Star Online said, "The film is not a disappointment, because there was not much of an expectation from the beginning. Those who have seen the director's earlier films know exactly what to expect. So, while the urban audience may squirm in their seats, the targetted audience – the B and C centres as they call them in filmy parlance – will most probably lap it all up". Malathi Ragarajan of The Hindu said, "Unfortunately, Rama. Narayanan is unable to use the setup creatively".
