= Vettu Onnu Thundu Rendu =

1998 film by C. Dinakaran

- Directed by: C. Dinakaran
- Starring: Mansoor Ali Khan; Ponnambalam; Keerthana
- Music by: A. K. Vasagan
- Release date: 1 May 1998
- Country: India
- Language: Tamil

Vettu Onnu Thundu Rendu (transl. One chop, two pieces) is a 1998 Indian Tamil-language film directed by Sakthi Chidambaram (credited as C. Dinakaran). The film stars Mansoor Ali Khan, Ponnambalam and Keerthana. It was released on 1 May 1998.

== Cast ==
- Mansoor Ali Khan as Singaram
- Ponnambalam as Veerapandi
- Keerthana as Ponmanam
- Chinni Jayanth
- Dhamu
- Pandu
- Sabitha Anand
- Kovai Sarala
- Bonda Mani
- Kullamani
- Babloo Prithiveeraj

== Production ==
Production took place throughout 1997, with the lead actor Mansoor Ali Khan prioritising the film as he was the main lead. The actor suffered an injury in a road accident during the making of the film.

== Soundtrack ==
The soundtrack was composed by A. K. Vasagan.

Track listing
No.	Title	Singer(s)	Length
1.	"Pudhuvaanam"	P. Unnikrishnan, Sujatha
2.	"Pacharisi"	Vasagan, Febi Mani
3.	"Vettu Onnu"	Mano
4.	"Ponnamma"	Unnikrishnan
5.	"Silu Silukkum"	Yugendran, Indhu
6.	"Moonu Mukalana"	Mano

== Release ==
In late 1998, Mansoor Ali Khan was arrested for causing a roadblock and obstructing traffic while protesting against pirated reruns of the film on cable television. His activity led to film distributor Chinthamani Murugesan releasing a press statement condemning the television's actions and prompted a shut down of cinema halls across Pondicherry for one day. He later filed a police complaint about the matter at Orleanpet police station and in 2001, the court sentenced two involved men to two years' imprisonment each and ordering them to pay a fine of ₹5 lakh (equivalent to ₹20 lakh or US$21,000 in 2023) for illegal streaming. In 2007, the court sentenced the two persons to six months' imprisonment each and ordered them to pay a fine of ₹3 lakh (equivalent to ₹9.1 lakh or US$9,400 in 2023) in a case of copyright infringement. Two years after the film's release, the producers were given a ₹5 lakh (equivalent to ₹21 lakh or US$21,000 in 2023) subsidy by the Tamil Nadu government along with several other films.
