= Magalirkkaga =

- Poster
- Directed by: Indhiyan
- Written by: Indhiyan
- Produced by: A. Govindaraja; K. Renu
- Starring: Khushbu; Vindhya; Kovai Sarala; Ranjith
- Cinematography: M. Rajendran
- Edited by: D. Rajkumar
- Music by: Varshan
- Production company: Akshaya Movies
- Release date: 3 June 2000
- Country: India
- Language: Tamil

Magalirkkaga (transl. For women) is a 2000 Indian Tamil-language film written and directed by Indhiyan. The film stars Khushbu, Vindhya, Kovai Sarala, and Ranjith while Thalaivasal Vijay, Devan, Anuja, and Vadivelu play supporting roles. The music for the film was composed by debutant Varshan and the film was released on 3 June 2000.

== Plot ==
Bhavani is a no-nonsense inspector at a police station composed primarily of female officers, consisting of a head constable, two constables, and a driver Bhupathi. Bhavani is engaged to the engineer Subramani, whom her family had helped support financially. They are shown to be a happy couple. Tragedy strikes when Deputy Commissioner Nagaraj, aided by the unapologetically corrupt Assistant Commissioner, sexually assaults Chithra. Bhavani is determined to get justice for her subordinate but faces numerous ordeals, including having to choose between her fiancé and her morals.

== Cast ==
- Khushbu as SI Bhavani
- Vindhya as Constable Chithra
- Kovai Sarala as Constable Rosa
- Ranjith as Subramani
- Ambika as Head Constable Panchavanam
- Thalaivasal Vijay as Nagaraj I.P.S
- Devan as Mathivanan, IG
- Anuja Reddy as Assistant Commissioner Soundarya
- Vadivelu as Bhupathi
- Jai Ganesh as Bhavani's father
- Vadivukkarasi as Subramani's mother
- Vennira Aadai Moorthy as Rosa's father
- Crane Manohar as Azhagurasa

== Production ==
The film marked the directorial debut of Indhiyan who earlier assisted V. Sekhar. The filming was held at Chennai, Mysore and Nagercoil. The set of police station was built at Film City.

== Soundtrack ==
The soundtrack was composed by Varshan and the lyrics were written by Annaadhasan, Thamarai, Ponniyin Selvan, Arivumathi and Kannabalan.

Track listing
No.	Title	Singer(s)	Length
1.	"Kosuvam Sorugi"	SPB Charan, Swarnalatha
2.	"Nootrandu" —"	Febi, Ganga
3.	"Therkathi Mappillai"	Vadivelu, Kovai Sarala
4.	"Siragugal Indri"	Sujatha Mohan
5.	"Pudhu Rosapoo"	Harini

== Reception ==
S. R. Ashok Kumar from The Hindu wrote, "'[Magalirkkaga]' has a message. But director Indian should have coated it with sugar. He thought that the antics of Vadivelu and Kovai Sarala would help make it enjoyable but he has been proved wrong. The director's intentions are right but he must have taken care while writing the screenplay." In addition, K. N. Vijiyan from New Straits Times called it "a treat for everyone for the family". A critic from the entertainment portal Tamil Movie Cafe noted, "the film is well-intentioned, but never really takes off". Indiainfo wrote, "The entire film is made lively by the fights and tussles between Sarla and Vadivelu. Kushboo does her bit well, looking every bit a policewoman. Ranjith is introduced only to play the romantic lead opposite her and has no role as such. Vindhya does not have much to do except to be the hapless rape victim. Witty dialogues and a taut screenplay may make the film a hit with the frontbenchers. Debutant music director Varshan’s music is nothing novel and cameraman Rajendra gives a camera work that suits this low-budget comedy film".
