= Swarnamalya =

Indian actress (born 1981)

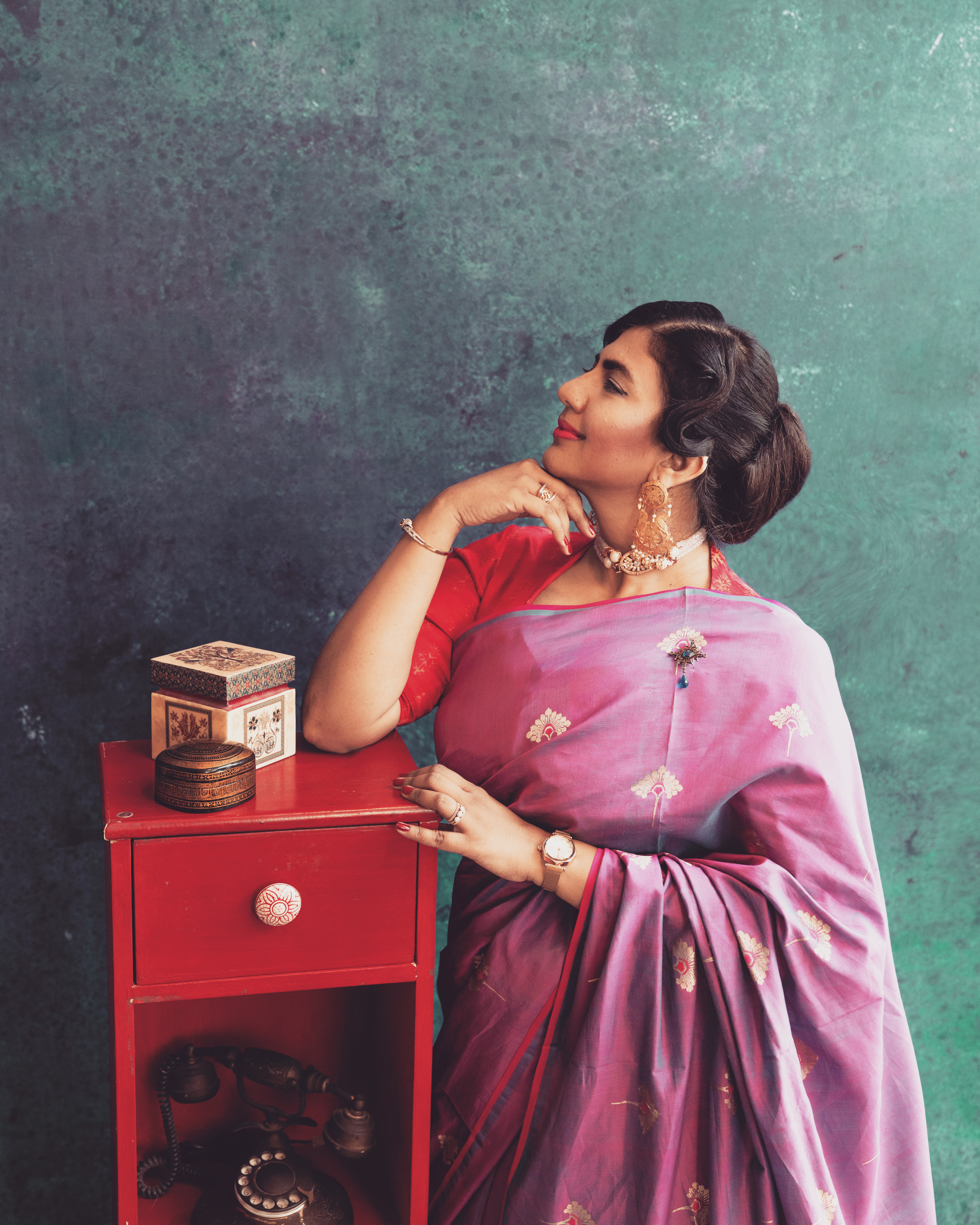
- Swarnamalya in 2024
- Born: 22 April 1981 (age 45); Madras (now Chennai), Tamil Nadu, India
- Education: San Jose State University (B.A.), Madras University (M.A., Ph.D.)
- Occupations: Actress; Dancer
- Years active: 2000‍–‍2014
- Works: Full list
- Spouse: Arjun Rajaraman (m. 2002; div. 2004)

Swarnamalya Ganesh is an Indian dancer, professor, actress, and TV anchor. She received the award "Yuvakala Bharat" at the age of 17. Her first major role in television was on the Sun TV show Ilamai Pudhumai and then went on to do a number of films in the Tamil language.

== Dance career ==
Swarnamalya started performing onstage from age 12, when she did her arangetram in the presence of Avvai Natarajan and Padma Subrahmanyam. Apart from dancing in sabhas of India such as the Narada Gana Sabha, Krishna Gana Sabha and the Vishaka Music Academy, she has performed in other festivals such as the India International centre, New Delhi, Modhera Sun Temple festival, the Henry Martin peace festival, Kochi Biennale, Serendipity Arts Festival and Faiz Festival, Lahore. She learnt from Guru Kalaimamani K. J. Sarasa and later trained under the Thiruvalaputhur Kalyani Grand Daughters, Gopalakrishna Nattuvanar and Viralimalai Muthukannamal.

She received her doctorate in dance from the University of Madras. She has asserted that her form of dancing, traditional Bharatanatyam, is an "inherently inclusive art".

Her work Nammai Marandarai Naam Marakkamattom was inspired by Silappadhikaram's dancer character Madhavi, and was meant to bring focus to her; it began in 2005, was premiered in 2015, and has continued at least through 2025.

She was an activist for the MeToo movement in India, and faced removal from events due to this.

=== From The Attic ===
Swarnamalya's doctoral work was The research and reconstruction of lost repertoires of the Nayaka Period in Early Modern South India. She has created a performance-exhibition-lecture series titled From The Attic aimed at journeying through the past performing practices, invoking multicultural memories of Sadir (Bharatanatyam). This series opens with Stories from the Attic, a lecture on the dance histories and contexts of Early Modern Era. Beholding the Attic is a special travelling exhibition curated to showcase rare sculptures, murals, scripts, costumes and photographs of courtesans of the 16th–20th centuries. The performance of From The Attic features repertoires like Mukhacali, Jakkini (Persianite influenced dance), Perani (A five act theatrical repertoire), Gondali (Marathi influenced), oriental padams (Works of Ruth. St. Denis, Ted Shawn, Ester Sherman and others).

Nayaka repertoires reconstructed by her:

- Gondhali
- Sivalila
- Jakkini
- Perani (Perini)
- Bahucari
- Char cari
- Danda Lasyam
- Duru Padam
- Nava Padam
- Kelikai
- Mukhacali

=== Publications (selected) ===
1. Kshetrayya and the legacy of erasing women's voices from erotic poetry, The News Minute, Feb 2020, Chennai https://www.thenewsminute.com/article/kshetrayya-and-legacy-erasing-women-s-voices-erotic-poetry-118165
2. Whose aesthetic is it anyway? Why classical arts must become more inclusive, The News Minute, April 2019, Chennai
3. Nammai Marandarai Naam Marakkamattom. Dr. Swarnamalya Ganesh.; published by South Indian Social History Research Institute (SISHRI); 2014. ISBN 978- 81- 910023-2-4
4. Dance History enshrined and decoded- Bharatanrityam and Bharatanatyam; published by Nartanam Dance Journal, Hyderabad. 2016
5. Through the Sheer of Gossamer" for NCPA OnSTAGE, Mumbai
6. Daughters of Pandanallur- the other story (Dance and history of the 28 Kilometer From Pandanallur to Kumbhakonam), The Kalakshetra Journal Vol IV, 2015
7. Discursive_Arguments_Dr_Swarnamalya_Ganesh Sex and Gender in Performance- Locating Power and Resistance as Discursive arguments, SNC Journal of Intercultural Philosophy, Chennai. Vol 28, Oct 2015; pp. 45–54
8. Disrespecting the Devadasi: What the MS Subhalakshmi debate has exposed, The News Minute, Chennai.
9. "Writings as operations of en(dis)franchisement, investigating manuscripts and choreographer's notes from the 16th-19th centuries. Advantages and problems in reconstructing from the papers" as part of Writing dance and dancing writing conference proceedings of Society of Dance History Scholars, USA
10. Notions of "Classical" in Bharatanatyam; a cultural operation of the classes- arguments of cosmopolitan Margi and indigenous Desi, repertoires of the Nayak period"; Kalakshetra Journal, Issue 2. ISBN 978-81-921627-4-4
11. Mired in Dravidian Politics: Were Tamil Nadu's Isai Vellalars always socially backward? The News Minute, Chennai
12. "Womanity--- selfhood and tenacity as keynotes of Sangam women" published essay as part of Voyages of the body and soul, selected female icons of India and beyond; Edited by Ketu Katrak & Anita Ratnam, Cambridge University Press, 2014
13. "Past performing practices of the Nayak period as vestibule to today's Bharatanatyam", The Madras Music Academy Journal; Vol 84, 2013, pp 10–118
14. "How the art of the Devadasi is appropriated to create the world of Bharatanatyam", The News Minute, Chennai. Feb 2017
15. "What's In a Name; Sadir and its Arguments", Journal for India International Center, New Delhi, Oct 2015
16. Regular contributor for OJAS-Oriental Journal of Asian Studies, SASTRA University, department of Oriental studies-Peer-Reviewed (ISSN 2319-717X)
17. "Stripling rogue at the shrine of the neat herd: A review of the Karana panels at the Sarngapani temple", Kumbhakonam (December 2012), pp. 47–61
18. Presented research paper "Past performing practices of the Nayak period: Research and reconstruction" for the C. P. Arts foundation
19. Womanity- Selfhood and Tenacity as keynotes for Sangam women, OJAS, 2013 (March) ISSN 2319-717X
20. Book - Raghunathabhyudayamu- transliteration and translation, a yakshaganam work in Telugu written by King Vijayaraghava Nayaka in the 17th century (forthcoming)
21. "Ravana Hatta, Ravana hasta and the Modern Violin, CARVA Academy of Violin, 2010 Rasa theory and Sigmund Freud—a psychological interpretation" Journal of the University of Madras, 150th year special issue, 2008
22. Editor of the monthly Newsletter for Association of Bharatanatyam Artistes of India (ABHAI); issues--- 25 issues, 2005, 2006
23. Founder editor of Tha Dhim the journal of the Department of Indian Music, University of Madras, 2007
24. Submits articles and research papers for academic journals and annals on dance history including for the Society of Dance History Scholars (SDHS) U.S.
25. Decolonising Dance History project- "Why we must not write a book on Devadasi (alternative ways of writing subaltern history)", PRAXIS, India; Oct 2020.

== Film career ==
She made her film debut through Maniratnam's Alai Payuthey, where she played the role of Shalini's elder sister Poorni.

She did only a few high-profile films such as Manobala's Naan Paata Ninepaethellam opposite Ramesh Aravind, a remake of the Hindi film Abhimaan (1973). Later she played second lead female roles in Mozhi (2007) and Engal Anna (2004).

=== Filmography ===
| Year | Film | Role | Language | Notes |
|---|---|---|---|---|
| 2000 | Alaipayuthey | Poorni | Tamil | Debut film |
| 2004 | Engal Anna | Parvathy | Tamil | |
| 2005 | Geeya Geeya | Swarna | Kannada | |
| 2005 | Sorry Enaku Kalyanamayidichu | Aparna | Tamil | |
| 2006 | Yuga | Bhanu | Tamil | |
| 2006 | Ennittum | Sujee | Malayalam | |
| 2007 | Mozhi | Angeline Sheela | Tamil | Nominated, Filmfare Award for Best Supporting Actress – Tamil; Nominated, Vijay Award for Best Supporting Actress |
| 2007 | Periyar | Thanjavur dancer | Tamil | |
| 2008 | Azhagu Nilayam | S. P. Rajakumari | Tamil | |
| 2008 | Velli Thirai | Herself | Tamil | Cameo appearance |
| 2008 | Kerala Police | Nandhini Varma | Malayalam | |
| 2011 | Sankarankovil | Shenbagam | Tamil | |
| 2014 | Inga Enna Solluthu | Subha | Tamil | |
| 2014 | Pulivaal | Bindhu | Tamil | |

== Television career ==
She began as a television anchor in Sun TV's show Illamai Pudumai. She also was the anchor of Vijay TV's Kalakka Povadhu Yaaru Part 2. She has also done Anbulla Snegithey. After this, she also acted in Bharathiraja's Thekkathu Ponnu, Jaya TV's Vandhaale Maharasi, Revathi's Yaathumaagi Nindraal and also played a guest role in Sun TV's Thangam.

Television performances

Sun TV, Vijay TV, Raj TV, Kalaignar TV, K TV, Sakti TV (Colombo), Vasantam Central (Malaysia)

=== Television appearances ===
| Title | Role | Language | Notes |
|---|---|---|---|
| Illamai Pudumai | Anchor | Tamil | Sun TV's show |
| Kalakka Povadhu Yaaru Part 2 | Anchor | Tamil | Vijay TV's show |
| Kudumba Thirai Pudhir | Anchor | Tamil | Kalaignar TV's show |
| Anbulla Snegithey | Actress | Tamil | TV Serial |
| Nimmathi Ungal Choice | Actress | Tamil | TV Serial as Shanthi |
| Thekkathu Ponnu | Actress | Tamil | TV Serial |
| Punnagi | Actress | Tamil | TV Serial |
| Minsara Poove | Actress | Tamil | Vijay TV Serial |
| Vandhaale Maharasi | Actress | Tamil | Jaya TV's TV Serial |
| Yaathumaagi Nindraai | Actress | Tamil | Zee Tamil's TV Serial |
| Thangam | Actress | Tamil | Sun TV's TV Serial as Nagarani |
| Chandrikaiyin Kathai | Actress | Tamil | Telefilm as Vishalakshi |
| Weekend with Stars (talk show) | Surprise guest | Tamil | Zee Tamil's show |
| Vanakkam Tamizha | Guest | Tamil | Sun TV's show |
| Manam Thirumbathe | Guest | Tamil | Puthuyugam TV's show |
| Beach Girls (Indian TV series) | Guest | Tamil | Raj TV's show |
| Varaverpparai | Guest | Tamil | News7 Tamil's show |
