= Azhagu Nilayam =

- Directed by: Rajaji
- Written by: Rajaji
- Produced by: B. Kiran Bhandari
- Starring: Vindhya; Swarnamalya
- Cinematography: Devi Charan
- Edited by: Murugaram
- Music by: Sabesh–Murali
- Production company: AKR Studios
- Release date: 28 March 2008
- Running time: 140 minutes
- Country: India
- Language: Tamil

Azhagu Nilayam (transl. Beauty Parlour) is a 2008 Indian Tamil-language action drama film directed by Rajaji. The film stars Vindhya and Swarnamalya, with Ponnambalam, Riyaz Khan, Thyagu, Rajeev, Salem Doctor Vijay, Muthukaalai, Nalini, Lavanya, Kalairani, Sri Lakshmi, Poovilangu Mohan, and C. R. Saraswathi playing supporting roles. The film, produced by B. Kiran Bhandari, was released on 28 March 2008.

== Plot ==
Lakshmi (Lavanya) is raped and killed by her brother-in-law Balaji. The corrupt police officer Mohankumar accepts the bribe from her in-laws to cover it up. Mohankumar finds out that Lakshmi had written a letter about the torture she had endured to her mother Indrani, so Mohankumar arrests her innocent mother and brother. After the suicide attempt of Indrani, a woman association comes to her help, and Bharathi (Vindhya) forces Balaji to confess his crime to the police. In the meantime, the politician Vanamamalai (Ponnambalam) orders his henchman and boxing champion Bhaskar (Riyaz Khan) to kill an IAS officer and his family who tried to expose the corruption of many politicians. Bhaskar is then arrested by the police, but in a short time, he is cleared of all charges by the court. After a boxing match, Bharathi seduces Bhaskar and goes to his house with him; she then shoots him dead at the right time.

The IG of police (Thyagu) pressures the police inspectors to find the culprit of the two murders, and the police inspector S. P. Rajakumari (Swarnamalya) starts investigating these murders. Rajakumari finds out that Bharathi is the murderer, her real name was Azhageshwari, and she was her collegemate.

In the past, Azhageshwari and Sathya fell in love with each other. Sathya's father Gounder (Rajeev) was against their love, and they decided to secretly get married; therefore, Gounder disowned Sathya. The couple moved to a different village, bought a house called "Azhagu Nilayam", and had a boy named Saravanan. One day, for his election campaign, Vanamamalai came to their village and fell under the spell of Azhageshwari. The night, Vanamamalai, Bhaskar, and Mohankumar entered their house. They beat up Saravanan and Sathya, brutally raped Azhageshwari, and set fire to Sathya and their house. Azhageshwari and Saravanan managed to escape. Saravanan became mentally ill and is living in a mental asylum, while Azhageshwari changed her name to Bharathi and became a club dancer to support her son.

After killing Bhaskar and Mohankumar, Azhageshwari eventually kills Vanamamalai during a function, and Rajakumari shoots Azhageshwari dead. Still, before dying, she begs Rajakumari to take care of Saravanan.

== Cast ==
- Vindhya as Azhageshwari/Bharathi
- Swarnamalya as S. P. Rajakumari
- Ponnambalam as Vanamamalai
- Riyaz Khan as Bhaskar
- Thyagu as IG of police
- Rajeev as Gounder
- Salem Doctor Vijay
- Muthukaalai as Kalaiyan
- Nalini as Gounder's wife
- Lavanya as Lakshmi
- Kalairani as Indrani, Lakshmi's mother
- Sri Lakshmi as Lakshmi's mother-in-law
- Poovilangu Mohan as Dr. Jaganathan
- C. R. Saraswathi as Woman association's member
- Siva Narayana Murthy as Hotel owner
- Helen Sweety as Kalaiyan's wife
- Usha Elizabeth as IAS officer's wife
- Kalanithi
- B. Kiran Bhandari
- Munithra
- Kanakapriya
- Priyanka
- Maya

== Production ==
Actress Vindhya was selected to play the heroine of the action film Azhagu Nilayam directed by newcomer Rajaji. For the film, she learnt martial arts at YMCA grounds in Chennai. Speaking of the film, Vindhya said, "Azhagu Nilayam is the name of the house in which I live. Some anti-social elements enter my house and give us few troubles. The rest is all about how I put an end to them".

== Soundtrack ==
Azhagu Nilayam

Soundtrack album by Sabesh–Murali
- Released: 2008
- Recorded: 2008
- Genre: Feature film soundtrack
- Length: 17:54
- Producer: Sabesh–Murali

The film score and the soundtrack were composed by Sabesh–Murali. The soundtrack features four tracks.

Tracklist
| No. | Title | Singer(s) | Length |
|---|---|---|---|
| 1. | "Hey Azhan Kuzan" | Suchitra | 4:23 |
| 2. | "Aattam Podava" | Malathy Lakshman | 3:50 |
| 3. | "Ragasiya Veppam" | Tippu, Pop Shalini | 5:05 |
| 4. | "Hey Othum Chinnam" | Suchitra, Anuradha Sriram | 4:36 |
| Total length: | | | 17:54 |
