= Engal Anna =

- Theatrical release poster
- Directed by: Siddique
- Written by: Siddique; Gokula Krishnan (dialogues)
- Based on: Chronic Bachelor (Malayalam)
- Produced by: Vijayakanth
- Starring: Vijayakanth; Prabhu Deva; Pandiarajan; Vadivelu; Namitha; Swarnamalya; Indraja
- Cinematography: Anandakuttan
- Edited by: T. R. Sekar; K. R. Gowrishankar
- Music by: Deva
- Production company: Aandal Azhagar Cine Combines
- Release date: 14 January 2004
- Running time: 162 minutes
- Country: India
- Language: Tamil

Engal Anna (transl. Our Elder Brother) is a 2004 Indian Tamil-language comedy drama film directed by Siddique. The film stars Vijayakanth in the main lead role, with Prabhu Deva, Pandiarajan, Vadivelu, Namitha, Swarnamalya, and Indraja, Lal, Manivannan, and Anandaraj in supporting roles. It is the Tamil remake of the director's own Malayalam film Chronic Bachelor (2003).

Engal Anna was released on 14 January 2004 and became a commercial success.

== Plot ==
The film opens with a flashback showing a feud between the families of Sundaralingam Prabhakaran (SP) and Bhavani Easwaramurthy. Prabhakaran and Bhavani are in love. SP's father Sundaralingam is wrongly accused of murdering Bhavani's father Easwaramurthy. Prabhakaran starts to help Bhavani's family and mortgages his own house to finance her factory with the intention of making it up to them as he believes that his father has indeed killed Bhavani's father. However, Bhavani is now trying to take revenge for her father's murder. SP's mother is now on her deathbed. While in the hospital, his mother tells how his father had a different wife and he should ask them forgiveness. Prabhakaran storms into Bhavani's house and accuses her uncle (who really killed Bhavani's father), also trying to make her understand the truth, but she does not believe him. Then, Prabhakaran says that he does not love her any more and vows that he will never trust a woman by remaining a chronic bachelor forever.

Then the film comes to the present time, showing a legal battle between Prabhakaran (now called SP) and Bhavani. Bhavani becomes furious when SP wins the legal battle to get back his house. She threatens to destroy SP. From here, the story moves to the day-to-day life of SP and falls into a comic track throughout the first half. SP is now a successful businessman. He has a stepsister named Parvathi, who is his father's daughter from his other wife. He now lives for her, but she does not know that SP is her brother, although she stays next door to him. Mayilsamy is SP's aide, and he too is a bachelor. Gowri comes to stay in the hostel where Parvathi stays and tries to win SP's heart, but SP considers her a nuisance.

SP agrees to take care of Kannan. Kannan is the son of Ramanathan, his uncle who had helped SP become a successful businessman. Kannan is a flirt and womaniser, so his mother wants SP to take care of him and change his behaviours for the better. However, what SP and his mother do not know is that Kannan has only agreed to stay in the house when he learns that Parvathi lives next door to SP in order to woo her. Comical scenes recur throughout the movie, where Mayil, who does not like Kannan and his friend Cheenu staying with them, tries to get them out of the house.

Gowri learns that SP is sponsoring Parvathi's studies and confronts him. SP tells her that Parvathi is his sister. Gowri then asks Parvathi to call SP for her birthday party. SP then gets upset and confronts Gowri. Gowri then reveals that her sponsor was SP all the while. During the birthday party, Bhavani comes and takes Gowri away. Then, it becomes clear that Gowri is Bhavani's sister. Rivalry arises between Gowri and Bhavani. Parvathi starts showing affection towards Kannan but says that it is wrong and walks away. At this time, Bhavani's husband Durairaj and his gang come to kidnap her. While rescuing Parvathi from Durairaj, Kannan decides to bring Gowri back too. Then, Gowri's family members come to take her forcefully, but they are stopped by Kannan. When told off by SP for doing so, he tells Mayil that he will sponsor the girl that loves SP like how SP sponsors the girl that he loves.

That is when SP asks Parvathi to move to his house. Kannan and Cheenu are moved to the guest house. Parvathi shows affection to Kannan. One day, SP and Mayilu catch Kannan trying to reach Parvathi through the balcony. That is where SP knows that both of them love each other. He tells Kannan to promise that he will never look at another girl in his life, and she (being Parvathi) should be the only one, which Kannan agrees to wholeheartedly. He fixes the marriage of Kannan and Parvathi. He transfers everything that he has to Parvathi's name because Kannan's family thought that Parvathi was an orphan. SP tells everything to Kannan's parents, which is overheard by Parvathi, who runs home crying. SP upset runs to comfort her, where he explains how he will live his life as an apology to her mother's curses. However, Parvathi tells that her mother loved him and told her to ask forgiveness if she sees him. Now, Parvathi and SP reunite as siblings. During the marriage festivities, Bhavani and Durairaj come to prevent the celebrations. Along with them comes the elder brother of Parvathi, Veerapandi. He challenges SP, saying that he has more right over Parvathi as he is her brother, while SP is just a stepbrother. Veerapandi then claims all of SP's property, which SP is willing to give, provided that Parvathi lives happily and marries Kannan. Bhavani's household members use Veerapandi to take advantage of SP; first by trying to snatch his company and then trying to snatch his home. In the brawl, SP vows that Parvathi will marry Kannan and he will wipe off everyone who stands in the way. Bhavani then tells SP that Parvathi will be married off to Bhavani's brother. Veerapandi supports in the name of revenge.

Parvathi, torn between two brothers, comes running when the brothers fight among themselves on the account of whom Parvathi will marry. She says that she wants to be happy with both her brothers so to stop fighting. Parvathi has been emotionally forced to marry Durairaj. She is rescued by Kannan, Mayil, and Cheenu. SP goes and pours kerosene on Bhavani to get her husband to tell the truth, and he finally admits that it was him and his father. He says how his father has done it for the money but he had done it because he loved her and she was his life. Bhavani realises her mistakes and goes to SP's house to apologise, but she tells SP that the only thing that she can now offer is the marriage proposal of her sister Gowri to SP. SP initially refuses when Kannan tells that he will also remain bachelor if SP does not marry. SP finally agrees and tells everyone to go inside with Gowri.

== Cast ==
- Vijayakanth as Sundaralingam Prabhakaran (SP)
- Prabhu Deva as Kannan
- Pandiarajan as Cheenu
- Vadivelu as Mayilsamy (Mayil)
- Namitha as Gowri
- Swarnamalya as Parvathi
- Indraja as Bhavani Easwaramurthy
- Manivannan as Ramanathan, SP's uncle & Kannan's father
- Lal as Sundaralingam & Veerapandi (dual role)
- Rajeev as Easwaramurthy
- Anandaraj as Durairaj
- Thyagu as Dharmaraj, Durairaj's father
- Pawan Kumar as Anand
- M. S. Bhaskar as Mani
- Vadivukkarasi as Easwari
- Kuyili as Lakshmi, Sundaralingam's first wife
- Yuvasri as Bhanumathi, Sundarlingam's second wife
- Sabitha Anand as Durga, Easwaramurthy's wife
- Pasi Sathya as Mangalam, Durairaj's mother
- Revathi Priya as younger Bhavani Easwaramurthy
- Vijaya Singh as Sushila, SP's neighbour
- Srilatha as Rani, Kannan's elder sister
- Minnal Deepa as Geetha, Kannan's girlfriend

== Production ==
After his previous ventures failed at the box office, Vijayakanth decided to remake the Malayalam film Chronic Bachelor in Tamil. Siddique, who directed the original, was assigned to direct the original version. Siddique had initially approached Karthik to play another lead role in the film, but the actor turned it down and the role went to Prabhu Deva. Bhairavi, who earlier appeared in Telugu films was selected to appear as lead actress made her debut in Tamil and also changed her name to Namitha. Indraja, who acted in the original film, along with Anandaraj and Pandiarajan, were selected to play supporting roles. The film marked the debut of Malayalam actor Lal in Tamil films.

== Soundtrack ==
The soundtrack was composed by Deva.

Track listing
No.	Title	Lyrics	Singer(s)	Length
1.	"Aasai Arasa"	Palani Bharathi	Anuradha Sriram, Shankar Mahadevan	4:56
2.	"Kadhal Dhushyantha"	Muthu Vijayan	Sujatha Mohan, Karthik	4:43
3.	"Kaal Kilo"	Muthu Vijayan	Prasanna, Pop Shalini	5:06
4.	"Konji Konji"	Pa. Vijay	P. Jayachandran, Ganga, Tippu	5:44
5.	"Mudhan Mudhalaga"	Thamarai	Hariharan, Sadhana Sargam	4:35
Total length:				21:43

== Release ==
Engal Anna was released on 14 January 2004, during Pongal. The film's distribution rights in NSC (North Arcot, South Arcot and Chengelpet districts) were sold for ₹60 lakh (equivalent to ₹2.3 crore or US$240,000 in 2026). Despite facing competition from other films released in the same period, including Kovil, Pudhukottaiyilirundhu Saravanan and Virumaandi, it became a success.

== Critical reception ==
Malathi Rangarajan of The Hindu wrote, "Towards the end the stepbrother angle is a slightly protracted piece. Yet most of the time, Engal Anna keeps you laughing." Cinesouth wrote, "Though the film does have a lot of mishaps still one could go to taste the old wine offered in new bottle". Malini Mannath of Chennai Online wrote "Humour, sentiment and romance, action and suspense, have all been blended together to give a wholesome family entertainer to the audience. Deftly directed by Siddique [...] it's a role that suits Vijaykant's age and stature, the actor sailing through it with easy assurance in his home production".

Deccan Herald wrote, "A series of incidents follow, interspersed with the right dose of humour, romance(between Prabhu Deva and Swarnamalya, Vijaykant and Namitha) , sentiment. Siddique, has done a neat job". Mokkarasu of Kalki called Vadivelu's comedy as the film's strong point. Sify wrote "It is another sparkling comedy based on family sentiments. Siddique seems to know the pulse of the audience and has created the character of Vijaykanth straight out of Jack Nicholson’s As good as it gets. This heady connotation is packaged well with the right mix of laughter, sentiments plus song and dances".
