= Sandesam =

Sandesham
- Theatrical release poster
- Directed by: Sathyan Anthikad
- Written by: Sreenivasan
- Produced by: S. S. T. Subrahmaniam
- Starring: Thilakan; Sreenivasan; Jayaram; Siddique; Kaviyoor Ponnamma; Maathu; Oduvil Unnikrishnan; K. P. A. C. Lalitha; Sankaradi
- Cinematography: Vipin Mohan
- Edited by: K. Rajagopal
- Music by: Johnson
- Production company: Evershine Productions
- Distributed by: Evershine Release
- Release date: October 30, 1991 (India)
- Running time: 137 minutes
- Country: India
- Language: Malayalam

Sandesam (transl. Message) is a 1991 Indian Malayalam-language political satire film directed by Sathyan Anthikad and written by Sreenivasan starring Thilakan, Sreenivasan, Jayaram, Oduvil Unnikrishnan, Siddique, Kaviyoor Ponnamma and Maathu. The film deals with political activism existing in Kerala and takes major digs on the political parties in the state. In the film, Raghavan, a retired railway employee, wishes to live the rest of his life with his family. However, he is forced to become a mediator and reconcile his two sons who feud over petty politics.

Sandesam is often regarded as a classic in Malayalam cinema. The film was included in IBN Live's list of "100 Greatest Indian Films of All Time". The film was remade in Tamil language as Veettai Paar Naattai Paar by director Thulasidas in 1994.

== Plot ==
After retirement from Indian Railways as station master, Raghavan Nair is back home. His long cherished dream to spend his retirement with his family consisting of his wife, three sons and two daughters gets a blow after witnessing his two sons brawling with each other over their political differences and the debilitating effect this has on the family. Prabhakaran, the elder one is a staunch leftist and an active worker of the Revolutionary Democratic Party (RDP), which has just lost the Kerala state Assembly elections and relinquished office. Prakashan, popularly known as KRP, Prabhakaran's younger brother is involved with the Indian National Secular Party (INSP) which has now come to power. Though they are both educated, neither has any plans to earn a living on their own and are fully immersed in petty politics, sponging off their parents for their needs.

Raghavan Nair becomes deeply worried about their future, and tries to advise his sons, but his admonitions fall on deaf ears. Aanandan, his son-in-law is a police sub-inspector, but on suspension. When RDP was in power, he had arrested and beaten up several of the opposition party workers on instruction from the ruling party officials. Now that the former opposition is in power, they exact their revenge; first by transferring him repeatedly to stations as remote as possible and then by suspending him.

As part of his retired life, Raghavan Nair decides to focus his attention on his agricultural activities and meets the new young agricultural officer Udayabhanu and with his wife's approval, wants their younger daughter Latika to marry him. But his elder sons oppose it for flimsy and petty reasons. Prakashan pulls some strings and gets him transferred immediately to a remote location in order to prevent the marriage, but Nair gets them married at the registrar's office.

In the meantime, Aanandan and his wife Lata (Raghavan Nair's oldest daughter) demand partition of the property and their share of the inheritance which Raghavan Nair objects to. The last straw is when their mother falls ill and is hospitalized and none of her children, especially the two older sons, show up at the hospital. Raghavan upon seeing all of them milling around his house on returning from the hospital, loses his temper. He kicks out all his children and orders them to never enter his house again. Despite his actions, Raghavan Nair is depressed at things hacing to come to this. Achu, Raghavan Nair's best friend and neighbor, informs him that Prabhakaran and Prakashan have started to repent, having quit their respective political parties, and are waiting at gate for Raghavan Nair's forgiveness. He calls them in and they begin a new life.

Some time later Prabhakaran who has started work as a lawyer and Prakashan is going for a job interview as part of their efforts to change and gain employment. At the same time, it is also seen that Prasanthan, the school-going youngest son of Raghavan Nair, has decided to form a student political organisation to conduct a protest at his school. But both his brothers having learnt their lesson the hard way, scold him and break the flag and banners he made. The movie ends here with the message clearly being delivered.

== Cast ==
- Thilakan as Raghavan Nair (Retd. Station Master - Indian Railway), father of Prabhakaran, Prakashan, Latha, Lathika and Prashanthan
- Sreenivasan as Kottappalli Prabhakaran a.k.a. Sakhavu Kottappalli a.k.a. Prabha, RDP member
- Jayaram as Kottappalli Prakashan "KRP", INSP member
- Oduvil Unnikrishnan as Achuthan Nair, Neighbour and friend of Raghavan Nair
- Siddique as Udayabhanu (Lathika's husband and Raghavan Nair's son-in-law), an Honest Agricultural officer
- Kaviyoor Ponnamma as Bhanumathi, wife of Raghavan Nair and mother of Prabhakaran, Prakasan, Latha, Lathika and Prashanthan
- Maathu as Lathika, Raghavan Nair's younger daughter, Udayabhanu's wife
- Mamukkoya as Mandalam President K.G. Pothuval, local leader of INSP
- Sankaradi as RDP Leader Sakhavu Kumara Pillai, the leftist ideologue
- Mala Aravindan as SI Aanandan, Lata's Husband, Raghavan Nair's oldest son-in-law.
- K. P. A. C. Lalitha as Latha. Anandan's wife and Raghavan Nair's elder daughter
- Innocent as Yashwant Sahai, the All-India joint-secretary of INSP (Cameo)
- Bobby Kottarakkara as Comrade Uthaman, RDP member
- Biyon as Santhosh, S.I. Aanandan's Son
- Ambili as Anu, S.I. Aanandan's Daughter
- T. P. Madhavan as C.I. Kannan
- Rahul Laxman as Prasanthan, Raghavan Nair's youngest son
- James as an INSP member
- Kalabhavan Haneef as INSP Worker
- Salim Kumar (uncredited role)

== Themes ==
In 2026, Kallara Ajayan of Kesari weekly compared Sandesham with N. P. Chellappan Nair's play Iblisukalude Naattil, which satirises Kerala's left- and right-wing politicians, noting the similarity in the premise adopted by Sreenivasan in the film.

== Soundtrack ==
- "Thumbappoo Kodiyuduthu" - K S Chitra, G. Venugopal, chorus

== Legacy ==
Sandesam is considered one of the best satire movies in the film industry. Many of the dialogues still find their way into the daily conversation of Malayalees. The infamous pennukaanal scene and the Poland dialogue is still etched into the viewer's hearts. In 2013, in an online poll conducted by CNN-IBN on their website as part of the 100 years celebration of Indian cinema, Sandesam was included in the poll for finding the "greatest Indian film ever". In 2024, a scene from Sandesam was recreated in an advertisement for an online mobile game; Dhyan Sreenivasan (son of Sreenivasan, who appeared as Prabhakaran in the film) acted in the advertisement, and Anoop Sathyan (son of Sathyan Anthikad, the director of the film) directed the advertisement.
