= Kanaa (TV series) =

- Genre: Drama; Romance
- Written by: Rajesh Kannan; Ramana
- Directed by: A.R.Karthik; N.V.Natarajan; P. Bharathi Raja; Pandiyan Aadhimoolam
- Starring: Dharshana Ashokan; Tonisha Kapileswarapu; Vishnu Unnikrishnan; Dhroshni Sekar
- Music by: Visu; Sai Bharath; Vikram Selva
- Opening theme: "Vaadi Veerayi" sung by Saindhavi
- Country of origin: India
- Original language: Tamil
- No. of seasons: 1
- No. of episodes: 665

Production
- Producer: John Attaikulam
- Cinematography: Arjunan Karthik; Daniel Dinesh
- Camera setup: Multi-camera
- Running time: 20–22 minutes per episode
- Production company: Yatra Media Works

Original release
- Network: Zee Tamil
- Release: 21 November 2022 – 2 November 2024

Kanaa (transl. To Dream) is a 2022—2024 Indian Tamil-language drama aired on Zee Tamil and streams on ZEE5. It stars Vishnu Unnikrishnan with Dharshana Ashokan (who was replaced by Tonisha Kapileswarapu) and Dhroshni Sekar. The series theme was taken from the own network series Azhagiya Tamil Magal (2017–2019).

It premiered on 21 November 2022 along with Indira. Kanaa is about Anbarasi, an innocent villager, dreams of making a name for herself in the field of sports but faces numerous obstacles. The series ended on 2 November 2024 with 665 episodes.

== Synopsis ==
An ambitious Anbarasi woman wants to pursue a career in athletics but is opposed by her parents. She then runs away from their house and competes in a prestigious running race.

== Cast ==
=== Main ===
- Dr. Dharshana Ashokan (2022 — March 2024) → Tonisha Kapileswarapu (Apr. 2024 - Nov. 2024) as Anbarasi Vishwa: Ananya's elder step-sister and Vishwa's love-interest-turned-wife
- Vishnu Unnikrishnan as Vishwa: Anbarasi's love-interest-turned-husband
- Dhroshni Sekar as Ananya: Anbarasi's younger step-sister and Jai's wife
- Navin Charles as Jai: Vishwa's elder brother and Ananya's husband

=== Recurring ===
- Keerthana as Kasthuri: Chandrashekhar's first wife, Anbarasi's mother and Ananya's step-mother (died)
- Manmohan as Chandrashekhar: Kasthuri's widower and Sivagami's husband, Anbarasi and Ananya's father
- Subathira as Sivagami: Chandrashekhar's second wife, Ananya's mother and Anbarasi's step-mother
- Reena as Chandrashekar’s mother. Anbarasi and Ananya’s grandmother

=== Cameo appearance ===
- Jai Akash (Cameo)

== Production ==
=== Casting ===
Actress Dharshana Ashokan initially played Anbarasi, the female lead role. Due to her some reason, she quit the series in early March 2024, then actress Tonisha was cast as Anbarasi. Vishnu Unnikrishnan plays the male lead, Vishwa, alongside her.
