= Sakthi Chidambaram =

Indian film director, screenwriter and actor

- Born: C. Divaakaran
- Occupations: Screenwriter, Film director, Actor
- Years active: 1992–present
- Spouse: Radha

Sakthi N Chidambaram (born Dinakar), is an Indian film director and screenwriter, who directs Tamil films.

== Career ==
His real name is C. Dhinakaran. He first wrote the dialogues for the films Kottai Vaasal (1992), Veettai Paaru Naattai Paaru (1994), Uzhiyan (1994) and Pathavi Pramanam (1994). Chidambaram made his directorial debut in 1997 with Samrat, starring Ramki, a remake of Hindi film Baazigar. In 1998, he directed the film Vettu Onnu Thundu Rendu, starring Mansoor Ali Khan in the lead role. Both films were failures.

After a gap, he changed his name and directed Ennamma Kannu (2000) with Sathyaraj. The film received mixed reviews and did well. The success of the film prompted director and actor to reunite to make Mr. Narathar with Abbas, Mumtaj and Divyaa Unni also joining the cast. Despite nearly completing shoot, the project was shelved and remains unreleased. His next directorial project, Charlie Chaplin (2002), was a hit, and its success led to various remakes in other languages. He created a record in Tamil cinema as it became the first to be remade in six Indian languages, including in Bollywood. His other projects, Inidhu Inidhu Kadhal Inidhu (2003) and Kadhal Kirukkan (2003), became box office disasters.

In 2004, he again collaborated with Sathyaraj with Maha Nadigan, a satire on cinema and politics. The film faced controversy prior to its release for its mockery of Tamil actors and politicians. In late 2004, he agreed to collaborate with Sathyaraj again in a project titled Saddam Hussein, but the project did not continue. In 2005, he briefly worked on the production of a film titled Pattasu with Sibiraj, Vikranth and Chaya Singh, but the film did not complete production.

Sakthi again directed Sathyaraj in Englishkaran (2005) and Kovai Brothers (2006), both successful. Sakthi has produced five screenplays which are Kovai Brothers (2006), Viyabari (2007), Sandai (2008), Rajadhi Raja (2009) and Guru Sishyan (2010). For the movie Kaavalan (2011), Sakthi bought Tamil Nadu rights.

In 2012, Sakthi Chidambaram began work on a film titled Machan and immediately speculation arose that Namitha, who has appeared in several of the director's previous films as well as being closely associated with the title, would play a pivotal part in the film. It was later announced that Siva Karthikeyan would play the lead role in the film alongside Dhansika, though the pair were later replaced by a new cast including Ramesh Aravind and comedians Vivek and Karunas. Despite the release of a trailer and soundtrack, the film did not have a theatrical release.

His next Charlie Chaplin 2 (2019), a comedy entertainer and a sequel to his 2002 blockbuster with the same name. But this sequel has no connection to the original except Prabhu Deva and Prabhu. The horror comedy Pei Mama with Yogi Babu was released in 2021. Then, the black comedy Jolly O Gymkhana (2024) with Prabhu Deva.

== Filmography ==
=== Filmmaker ===
Year	Film	Writer	Producer	Director	Notes	Refs
1992	Kottai Vaasal	Yes	No	No		
1992	Veettai Paar Naattai Paar	Yes	No	No		
1994	Uzhiyan	Yes	No	No		
1994	Pathavi Pramanam	Yes	No	No		
1997	Samrat	No	No	Yes		
1998	Vettu Onnu Thundu Rendu	No	No	Yes		
2000	Ennamma Kannu	No	No	Yes		
2002	Charlie Chaplin	No	No	Yes		
2003	Inidhu Inidhu Kadhal Inidhu	No	No	Yes		
2003	Kadhal Kirukkan	No	No	Yes		
2004	Maha Nadigan	No	No	Yes		
2005	Englishkaran	No	No	Yes		
2006	Kovai Brothers	No	Yes	Yes		
2007	Viyabari	No	Yes	Yes		
2008	Pazhani	No	Yes	No		
2008	Sandai	No	Yes	Yes		
2009	Rajadhi Raja	No	Yes	Yes		
2010	Guru Sishyan	No	Yes	Yes		
2019	Charlie Chaplin 2	No	No	Yes		
2021	Pei Mama	No	No	Yes		
2024	Jolly O Gymkhana	No	No	Yes		

=== Actor ===
Year	Film	Role	Notes	Refs
1992	Kottai Vaasal	Periyavar's assistant		
1994	Uzhiyan	Govindaraj's assistant		
1999	Jodi	Prashanth's friend	Credited as Dinakar	
2007	Vyabari		Cameo appearance in song "Vyabari"	
2013	Thillu Mullu	Film director	Cameo appearance	
2024	Jolly O Gymkhana	Kesavan Kutty	Cameo appearance	

=== Lyricist ===
Year	Film	Song	Notes	Refs
2002	Charlie Chaplin	"Shansha Shalpasha"		
2003	Kadhal Kirukkan	"Hey Penne"		
2008	Sandai	"Maduraikara Ponnu"		
2013	Machan	"Nanba Enna Marandhuttiya"		
2019	Charlie Chaplin 2	"Kadhal Oru Kannadi"		
2021	Pei Mama	"Hey Enna Vechu", "Maattikitanda", "Pei Ottum"		
2024	Jolly O Gymkhana	All songs	Co-written with M Jegan Kaviraj	

=== Distributor ===
Year	Film	Notes	Refs
2011	Kaavalan	Tamil Nadu distribution rights	

== Controversy ==
Shakthi N Chidambaram lashed out at actress Suhasini for giving bad reviews of his film Rajadhi Raja (2009).
