= Keerthana (actress) =

Indian actress

- Occupation: Film actress

Keerthana is an Indian film and television actress. She handled lead and supporting roles during the 1990s in Tamil, Telugu and Malayalam film. She entered the Tamil film field through Naalaiya Theerpu in 1992, which was Vijay's 1st film as a lead actor.

== Partial filmography ==
Year	Film	Role	Language	Notes
1992	Naalaiya Theerpu	Priya	Tamil	Debut film
1993	Suriyan Chandiran	Keerthana	Tamil	
1994	Pathavi Pramanam	Seetha Lakshmi	Tamil	
1994	Sundara Vadana Subbalaxmi Moguda		Telugu	
1994	Ungal Anbu Thangachi	Rekha	Tamil	
1994	Pavithra	Chitra	Tamil	
1995	Thai Thangai Paasam	Meena	Tamil	
1995	Mannai Thottu Kumbidanum	Rasathi	Tamil	
1996	Mummy Mee Aayanochadu	Sangeeta	Telugu	
1996	Vetri Mugam	Sumathi	Tamil	
1996	Minor Mappillai	Seetha	Tamil	
1996	Ladies Doctor	Rani	Telugu	
1996	Saamoohya Paadam	Ammu	Malayalam	
1997	Seethakka	Ammulu	Telugu	
1997	Allari Pellikoduku		Telugu	
1997	Paththini	Geetha	Tamil	
1997	Ancharakalyanam	Seetha	Malayalam	
1998	Vettu Onnu Thundu Rendu	Ponmanam	Tamil	
1998	Ganesh	Ganga	Telugu	
1998	Kallu Kondoru Pennu	Deepa	Malayalam	
1999	Mudhal Etcharikkai	Priya	Tamil	
1999	Pooparika Varugirom	Ramya	Tamil	
2002	Tella Gulabi	Keerthana	Telugu	
2003	Saamy	Venkatraman's wife	Tamil	
2003	Galatta Ganapathy	Jagan's wife	Tamil	
2003	Kadhal Kirukkan	P. Krishnan's wife	Tamil	
2005	Good Bad Ugly	Keerthana	Kannada	
2006	Parijatham	Subathra's sister	Tamil	
2007	Ippadikku En Kadhal	Cheran's sister-in-law	Tamil	
2025	Baby and Baby	Mahalingam's wife	Tamil	Uncredited

== Television ==
Year	Title	Role	Channel
1998–1999	Akshaya	Rekha/Akshaya	Sun TV
2000	Micro Thodragal - Kaathirukka Oruthi		Raj TV
2003	Salanam	Nandhini	Vijay TV
2003–2004	Annamalai	Indumathy	Sun TV
2004	Roja	Anjali	Jaya TV
2004–2005	Engiruntho Vanthaal	Uma	Jaya TV
2005–2007	Kolangal	Uma	Sun TV
2005	My Dear Bootham	Kanga (Special Appearance)	Sun TV
2006–2007	Raja Rajeshwari	Neeli	Sun TV
2008–2009	Namma Kudumbam	Vimala	Kalaignar TV
2020–2021	Agni Natchathiram	Jayanthi	Sun TV
2020–2021	Roja	Arulvakhu Vedhavalli	Sun TV
2020–2021	Thirumathi Hitler	Keerthana	Zee Tamil
2021	Anbe Vaa	Arulvakhu Vedhavalli (Special Appearance)	Sun TV
2021–2022	Vidhya No. 1	Parvathy	Zee Tamil
2022–2024	Ethirneechal	Parvathy	Sun TV
2022	Vanakkam Tamizha	Guest	Sun TV
2022	Porantha Veeda Puguntha Veeda	Herself	Sun TV
2022	Sippikul Muthu	Mallika (Special Appearance)	Star Vijay
2022–2024	Chellamma	Lakshmi	Star Vijay
2022	Vaadi Rasathi	Rasathi	Vendhar TV
2022–2023	Magarasi	Durga Bhai	Sun TV
2022–2024	Kanaa	Kasturi	Zee Tamil
2023	Maari	Amman (Special Appearance)	Zee Tamil
2023	Geethanjali	Special Appearance	Gemini TV
2023	Poova Thalaya	Malini (Special Appearance)	Sun TV
2024	Karthigai Deepam	Sivagami (Special Appearance)	Zee Tamil
2025	Maari 2	Dhumorna (Extended Special Appearance)	Zee Tamil
2026	Ethirneechal Thodargiradhu	Parvathy	Sun TV
2026–present	Ayali	Archana	Zee Tamil
