= Veettai Paaru Naattai Paaru =

1994 film by Thulasidas

- Theatrical release poster
- Directed by: Thulasidas
- Written by: C. Dhinakaran (dialogues)
- Based on: Sandesam by Sreenivasan
- Produced by: K. Prabhakaran
- Starring: Sivakumar; Saravanan; Thalaivasal Vijay; Jayanthi
- Cinematography: Thangar Bachan
- Edited by: Lancy–Mohan
- Music by: Deva
- Production company: Anbalaya Films
- Release date: 5 February 1994
- Country: India
- Language: Tamil

Veettai Paaru Naattai Paaru (transl. Look at the house, look at the country) is a 1994 Indian Tamil-language political satire film directed by Thulasidas. A remake of the Malayalam film Sandesam (1991), it stars Sivakumar, Saravanan, Thalaivasal Vijay and Jayanthi. The film was released on 5 February 1994.

== Plot ==
Palanivel, a military personnel, comes home to enjoy retirement with his wife and family. But politics has divided his two sons Siva and Sakthi. They support opposing political parties and things escalate when one of the parties wins in the local elections. Palanivel and his family are caught in the middle and even lose their previous land whose sale proceeds is for the political coffers but ends up in the pockets of the politicians. The brothers eventually realise their folly when their leaders are exposed.

== Cast ==
- Sivakumar as Palanivel
- Saravanan as Siva
- Thalaivasal Vijay as Sakthi
- Jayanthi as Palanivel's wife
- Ranjitha as Saravanan's fiancée
- Meera as Saravanan's sister
- Vaishnavi as Palanivel's daughter-in-law
- Vennira Aadai Moorthy as a politician
- Janagaraj as a politician
- S. S. Chandran as a political leader
- R. Sundarrajan
- Chithra

== Production ==
Veettai Paaru Naattai Paaru, a remake of the 1991 Malayalam film Sandesam, is the Tamil debut of director Thulasidas, who previously directed several Malayalam films. It was produced by K. Prabhakaran under Anbalaya Films. The story was written by Suriyan, and the dialogues by Sakthi Chidambaram, using his real name C. Dhinakaran.

== Themes ==
According to critic Malini Mannath, the film intends to convey the message, "Set your own house in order, and then go out to set your country right".

== Soundtrack ==
The soundtrack was composed by Deva, with lyrics by Siva.

Track listing
No.	Title	Singer(s)	Length
1.	"Naan Padugiren"	S. P. Balasubrahmanyam, Suvarna
2.	"Kadaiyanalloor"	S. P. Balasubrahmanyam, Suvarna
3.	"Pudhu Bharathame"	S. P. Balasubrahmanyam, Suvarna
4.	"Rajani Ranjani"	Sunandha
5.	"Petha Manam"	Unni Menon
6.	"Elumicham Poove"	Mano, K. S. Chithra

== Release and reception ==
Veettai Paaru Naattai Paaru was released on 5 February 1994. Malini Mannath wrote in The Indian Express on 11 February 1994, "The treatment is light-hearted in the first half and one is quite happy with the punch lines and quips that keep one entertained. But the second half has not even these." She criticised the performance of Saravanan and the treatment of Ranjitha, but praised the performance of Vijay and the comedy subplot featuring Sundarrajan and Chithra. K. Vijiyan of New Straits Times wrote on 2 July 1994, "Do not miss this one if you love politics and follow political events in India with relish." Thulasi of Kalki appreciated the message in the film, but criticised the filmmaking style.
