= Pei Mama =

2021 film by Sakthi Chidambaram

- Theatrical release poster
- Directed by: Sakthi Chidambaram
- Produced by: Vignesh Ealappan
- Starring: Yogi Babu; Malavika Menon; Rajendran
- Cinematography: M. V. Panneerselvam
- Edited by: Preetham
- Music by: Raj Aryan
- Production company: Bakiya Cinemass
- Release date: 24 September 2021
- Country: India
- Language: Tamil

Pei Mama (transl. Uncle Ghost) is a 2021 Indian horror comedy film directed by Sakthi Chidambaram and produced by Bakiya Cinemass. The film stars Yogi Babu, Malavika Menon, and Motta Rajendran, while Abhishek Vinod, M. S. Bhaskar, and Kovai Sarala play supporting roles. In the film, some spirits haunt a mansion in an attempt to serve justice to the owner who wronged them. posing as ghosthunters, a family of crooks ends up becoming a part of the fight.

The music was composed by Raj Aryan with cinematography by M. V. Panneerselvam and editing by Preetham. The film released on 24 September 2021.

== Cast ==
- Yogi Babu as Kozhi Kumar
- Malavika Menon as Pooja
- Motta Rajendran as Sethupathi
- Abhishek Vinod as Veeramani
- M. S. Bhaskar as Sabapathy
- Kovai Sarala as Serupadi Sitharamma
- Lollu Sabha Manohar
- Rekha as Jothi
- Anupama Kumar
- Singampuli
- Powerstar Srinivasan
- Narayan Lucky
- Livingston
- Reshma Pasupuleti as Geetha
- Imman Annachi as Pasupathy
- Ramesh Khanna
- Chaams
- Vaiyapuri as Pooja's Father
- Krishnamoorthy
- Kavya Suresh as Doctor Nirmala
- Anu Mohan
- Bosskey
- Ganeshkar
- Aryan
- Chavi Sharma as Baby Hansika (Malar)
- Rahul Thatha

== Production ==
In March 2019, Sakthi Chidambaram announced plans of making a film titled Pei Mama starring Vadivelu in the lead role. The actor later opted out of the project citing creative differences.

Sakthi Chidambaram became interested in casting Yogi Babu after media reports had suggested that the actor was set to replace Vadivelu in the shelved sequel to Imsai Arasan 23rd Pulikecei (2006). Despite initially being reluctant, the actor agreed to join the film and completed shooting for the film by November 2019. Comedy actor Krishnamoorthy suffered a heart attack and died during the making of the film in Kumily.

In October 2020, the team held a function to release the audio soundtrack of the film. The event garnered attention as guests failed to adhere to the city's social distancing guidelines. As the film began promotions in September 2021, the film garnered criticism for morphing posters of the Hindi film Bhoot – Part One: The Haunted Ship (2020) to use for its own promotions.

== Soundtrack ==
The soundtrack was composed by Raj Aryan, collaborating with Yogi Babu for the second time after Gurkha (2019).

All lyrics by Sakthi Chidambaram.

Pei Mama

Soundtrack album by Raj Aryan
- Released: 2021
- Genre: Feature film soundtrack
- Length: 12:34
- Language: Tamil
- Label: Lahari Music
- Producer: Raj Aryan

Raj Aryan chronology
Gurkha (2019)	Pei Mama (2021)

Track listing
No.	Title	Singer(s)	Length
1.	"Hey Enna Vachi"	Senthil Ganesh, Rajalakshmi	3:18
2.	"Pei Ottum"	Raj Aryan	2:43
3.	"Maatikittanda"	Deva	2:17
4.	"Engeyo Piranthen"	Varun, Ramya	2:00
5.	"Vetta Vetta"	Priya Subramaniam	2:16
Total length:			12:34

== Release and reception ==
The film was released on 24 September 2021 across Tamil Nadu. A critic from Times of India wrote "things turn rather uninspiring in the latter half with a very clichéd flashback and a generic climax". Tamil newspapers Maalai Malar and Vikatan gave the film negative reviews.

Within two weeks after its release, the film had its television premiere on Kalaignar TV on 14 October 2021 on the eve of Vijayadasami.
