= Weekend with Stars =

- Genre: Talk show
- Created by: Zee Tamil
- Directed by: Madhan Singh
- Presented by: Suhasini Maniratnam
- Country of origin: India
- Original language: Tamil
- No. of episodes: 13

Production
- Producer: Jai Aachari
- Camera setup: Multi-camera
- Running time: approx. 55–60 minutes
- Production company: RM Associates

Original release
- Network: Zee Tamil
- Release: 30 April – 23 July 2017

Related
- Weekend with Ramesh

Weekend with Stars is a 2017 Indian Tamil language talk show which aired on Zee Tamil on every Sunday at 8:30 pm to 10:00 pm (IST). It debuted on 30 April 2017, aired through 23 July 2017. The show was hosted by Tamil actress and director Suhasini Maniratnam. It is based on the Zee Kannada talk show Weekend with Ramesh.

== Overview ==
The format of the show involves achievers from various fields, primarily from Tamil Nadu, being invited and the story of their life being told. The show will feature personalities from the Tamil film industry or celebrities from Tamil Nadu who will talk about their life. The show will also have a surprise as friends and family members join in.

== Hosts ==
- Episodes 01–12: Suhasini Maniratnam
- Episode 13: Archana (with Suhasini Maniratnam as the interview subject)

== Episodes ==
Episodes	Celebrities	Notes	Surprise Guest / Surprise Video	Telecast date
01	Khushbu	Actress, television presenter	Her Teachers, Friends (Subbu Panchu Arunachalam, Brinda), Family members (Mother) and P. Vasu (Video)	30 April 2017
02	K. Bhagyaraj	Actor, director, screenwriter	Sulakshana, Priyadarshini and Family members (Poornima Jayaram)	7 May 2017
03	Radhika	Actress, Producer, Entrepreneur	K. S. Ravikumar, Family members (R. Sarathkumar, Geetha Radha, Nirosha) and Roja (Video)	14 May 2017
04	Viswanathan Anand	chess Grandmaster and a former World Chess Champion.	His Friends and Aamir Khan (Video)	21 May 2017
05	T. Rajendar	screenwriter, songwriter, composer, cinematographer, producer, director, actor, playback singer, politician and film distributor	Mumtaj, Dhina, Perarasu	28 May 2017
06	R. Madhavan	Actor, writer, producer	Thananjan, Vikram Kumar and Family members Sarita Birje (Her Wife) and Vethand Her Son (Video)	4 June 2017
07	Vivek	Actor, Comedian	His Friends and Family members Tejaswini (Daughter) and Amrithanandini, Solomon Pappayya (Video)	11 June 2017
08	Arjun Sarja	Film actor, director, producer, screenwriter, distributor	His Friends and Family members Asha Rani (Wife) Aishwarya Arjun (Daughter) and Vishal (Video)	18 June 2017
09	Roja	Actress, Politician	Her Friends and Family members (R. K. Selvamani (Husband), 2 Children's) and Prabhu Deva, Prashanth (Video)	25 June 2017
10	Prakash Raj	Film actor, Producer, director, Television presenter	Swarnamalya, Elango Kumaravel, Ganavel	2 July 2017
11	A. R. Rahman	Singer, songwriter, composer, record producer, music director, arranger, conductor	His wife and Friends	9 July 2017
12	A. R. Rahman	Singer, songwriter, composer, record producer, music director, arranger, conductor	His wife and Friends	16 July 2017
13	Suhasini Maniratnam	actress and director	friends and mother and Maniratnam(video)	23 July 2017
