= Yes Madam (2003 film) =

- Poster
- Directed by: Rajaji
- Written by: Rajaji; Jai Ramji (dialogues)
- Produced by: K. Sandeep Bandari, P. Santhilal Borundiya
- Starring: Prabhu; Vijayalakshmi; Vindhya
- Cinematography: Nithyanandham
- Edited by: Peter Babiya
- Music by: Bharani
- Production company: Bheemaraja Pictures
- Release date: 21 February 2003
- Country: India
- Language: Tamil

Yes Madam is a 2003 Indian Tamil-language comedy drama film, directed by Rajaji, starring Prabhu, Vijayalakshmi and Vindhya. The film was released on 21 February 2003.

== Plot ==
Sivaramakrishnan reads a poem written by Gayathri and starts to call and talk to her regularly as a fan. Meanwhile Gayathri's parents look for a groom for her and a doctor comes to see her for getting married. But because he was late, Gayathri leaves to office and couldn't meet him. So the doctor sends his photograph which is mistakenly exchanged with Sivaramakrishnan's photo and Gayathri ends up seeing his photos and also starts loving him. This creates a hot conversation between the doctor and Gayathri and Gayathri leaves her house because of her father's scolding. She stays in her friend's house where she meets Sivaramakrishnan who is staying in his colleague's house. She mistakes him thinking he has ruined her marriage and tries to take revenge but later her friend who returns back to her house, tells that she did it purposefully because that doctor cheated her and doesn't want Gayathri also to be cheated by him. Gayathri realises her mistake and asks sorry and also in the 'Pattimandram' she talks in such a way that she marries Sivaramakrishnan then and there and goes to his house. It is revealed that sivaramakrishnan has a first wife named Sumathi who has divorced him and they have a son. In order to trouble him again and spoil his married life she starts to live in a house in front of his house. She quarrels with gayathri telling that Sivaramakrishnan is her husband. Gayathri loses peace of mind but Sivaramakrishnan assures her that he loves only Gayathri and tells her the flashback in which Sumathi who is his father's sister's daughter is being compelled and married to him and after marriage he and his parents understand that she is a very arrogant and selfish woman who doesn't give any importance to their feelings. Even though she becomes pregnant she decides to get a divorce from him because of a fight with Sivaramakrishnan and his parents. After many quarrels between Sumathi and Gayathri, Sumathi realises her mistake and goes to Sivaramakrishnan and apologises for her mistake and tells that she will leave him and Gayathri to live peacefully by going back to her house. Meanwhile her son gets fits and Gayathri carries him to a hospital where the doctor is the one she previously had misunderstanding with. He tells that he will give treatment to the boy only if she accepts to pose naked for the photos he take. Sivaramakrishnan and Sumathi come there and rescue them and in the process Sivaramakrishnan gets stabbed by the villain and gets admitted in the hospital. Finally he wakes up and sees Sumathi and his son and catches their hands for which Gayathri feels sad and is about to leave when the boy calls her back and then Sivaramakrishnan thinks about the flashback in which Sumathi has assured that she is leaving them and going back to her village with her dad and her son.

== Cast ==
- Prabhu as Sivaramakrishnan
- Vijayalakshmi as Gayathri
- Vindhya as Sumathi
- Goundamani as Ganesh Kumar
- Senthil as Arvind Swamy
- Manorama as Sivaramakrishnan's mother
- Anandaraj as Doctor
- Vennira Aadai Moorthy as Sivaramakrishnan's father
- Alphonsa as Rani
- Scissor Manohar
- Solomon Pappaiah as himself (guest appearance)

== Soundtrack ==
Soundtrack was composed by Bharani.

Song	Singers	Lyrics
"Aada Ponnu"	Harish Raghavendra	Kamakodiyan
"Avaram Poo Meni"	Swarnalatha	Palani Bharathi
"Bam Bam Barala"	Anuradha Sriram, Harish Raghavendra	Ravi
"Mama Yem Mama"	Swarnalatha	Newton
"Samimelai Sathyam"	Hariharan, Sujatha	Pa. Vijay

== Reception ==
Krishna Chidambaram of Kalki praised the humour; however felt the film was absurd, cited songs as speed breakers and climax as so-so and called the film as just pass. Malini Mannath of Chennai Online said the film "doesn’t disappoint, in the sense that it moves in the expected, predictable way one would expect a Prabhu-film to". Sify wrote, "It is the same old wine in a new bottle. Such genre of films will work only in Tamil where the B and C audience lap up such subjects". The relative success of the film prompted the producers to sign Prabhu to work on a film titled Sabash Sagalai soon after release. Sherin was cast opposite Prabhu, though the film was later stalled.
