= Vindhya (actress) =

Indian politician

Joint Propaganda Secretary of the All India Anna Dravida Munnetra Kazhagam
- Incumbent
- Assumed office 27 September 2023
- General Secretary: Edappadi K. Palaniswami
- Propaganda Secretary: M. Thambidurai

Deputy Propaganda Secretary of the All India Anna Dravida Munnetra Kazhagam
- In office 25 July 2020 – 27 September 2023
- General Secretary: Edappadi K. Palaniswami
- Propaganda Secretary: M. Thambidurai
- Succeeded by: S. Ayyaduraipandian

Personal details
- Born: 12 August 1980 (age 46) Tirupati, Andhra Pradesh, India
- Party: All India Anna Dravida Munnetra Kazhagam (Since 2006)
- Spouse: Gopalakrishnan (m. 2008; div. 2012)
- Occupation: Film actress, politician

Vindhya (born 12 August 1980) is an Indian politician and former actress who appeared in Tamil language films. She currently serves as joint propaganda secretary in All India Anna Dravida Munnetra Kazhagam. She appeared in notable productions including Sangamam (1999), alongside Rahman.

== Early life and career ==
Vindhya was born on 12 August 1980 in a Telugu family. She made her cinematic debut with Sangamam (1999) alongside Rahman. Even though the film won positive reviews and the soundtrack was praised, it performed below average at the box office. After Sangamam, she appeared in more films as well as appearing as an item number in some films. Vayasu Pasanga is one of her box office hits. Vindhya married Gopalakrishnan, actress Bhanupriya's brother, in an arranged marriage on 16 February 2008 at the Guruvayur Temple. She filed for a divorce in 2012.

== Political career ==
In April 2006, Vindhya joined the AIADMK in the presence of Then Party General Secretary Jayalalithaa and campaigned for 2006 Tamil Nadu assembly election. Vindhya campaigned against the Dravida Munnetra Kazhagam during the 2011, 2016 state assembly elections, 2014 loksabha election and was instrumental in the defeat of that party. She was the staunch loyalist of Former chief minister of Tamil Nadu and AIADMK Supremo J. Jayalalithaa.

Vindhya used to present the basketful of mangoes from her chandragiri garden to Jayalalithaa during her yearly summer visit to later's poes garden residence from 2012 to 2016. Jayalalithaa used to praise Vindhya for those delicious mangoes. Even after Jayalalithaa's death, she continued offering the mango baskets at Jayalalithaa's memorial and distributed it to the locals at Marina Beach.

After Jayalalithaa's demise in 2016, Vindhya stayed away from active politics. On 20 February 2018, Vindhya again came to prominence when she wrote a letter to then Tamil Nadu Chief Minister Edappadi K. Palaniswami on his completion of 1 year in office. Ahead of 2019 loksabha election, she made a comeback as a star campaigner of the party. In July 2020, she was appointed as the deputy propaganda secretary of AIADMK Party. She campaigned for the party in 2021 Assembly Election. On 27 September 2023, she was appointed as the Joint Propaganda Secretary of AIADMK.

== Filmography ==
Year	Film	Role	Language	Notes
1999	Sangamam	Abirami	Tamil	
2000	Thirunelveli	Rani	Tamil	
2000	Magalirkkaga	Chitra	Tamil	
2000	Uyirile Kalanthathu		Tamil	Special Appearance
2000	Kannukku Kannaga	Selvi	Tamil	
2001	En Purushan Kuzhandhai Maathiri	Sinthamani	Tamil	
2001	Simharasi	Rani	Telugu	
2001	Viswanathan Ramamoorthy	Shenbagam	Tamil	
2001	Dubai	Susanna	Malayalam	
2001	Maayan		Tamil	
2001	Ravanaprabhu		Malayalam	Special appearance
2002	Charlie Chaplin	Amudha	Tamil	
2002	Namma Veetu Kalyanam	Geetha	Tamil	
2002	Alli Arjuna		Tamil	Special appearance
2002	Red	Mayakka	Tamil	
2003	Aasai Aasaiyai		Tamil	Special appearance
2003	Yes Madam	Sumathi	Tamil	
2003	Kilichundan Mampazham	Fathima	Malayalam	
2003	Seetayya		Telugu	
2004	Vayasu Pasanga	Nandhini	Tamil	
2004	Settai	Sundari	Tamil	
2004	Arasatchi		Tamil	
2005	Kannamma	Mala	Tamil	
2005	Isra	Nirupama	Malayalam	
2005	Love Story		Kannada	
2006	Azhagiya Asura		Tamil	Special appearance
2008	Azhagu Nilayam	Azhageshwari/Bharathi	Tamil	
2008	Aayudham Seivom		Tamil	Special appearance as dancer
2012	Vattaparai		Tamil	
