= Ennamma Kannu =

- VCD cover
- Directed by: Sakthi Chidambaram
- Written by: Sakthi Chidambaram
- Produced by: V. A. Durai
- Starring: Sathyaraj; Devayani
- Music by: Deva
- Production company: Evergreen Movie International
- Release date: 16 June 2000
- Running time: 144 minutes
- Country: India
- Language: Tamil

Ennamma Kannu is a 2000 Indian Tamil-language drama film, written and directed by Sakthi Chidambaram. The film stars Sathyaraj and Devayani, with Ranjith and Vadivelu in key roles. It was released on 16 June 2000. The name of the film was inspired by a song from Mr. Bharath (1986), which also starred Sathyaraj. The film was remade in Telugu as Ramma Chilakamma in 2001.

== Plot ==
Kasi is a womaniser leading a carefree life with his friend Chellappa. Kasi meets Gayathri and mistakes her as a call girl but later realises her true identity. This creates a bad impression in Gayathri for Kasi. Barath Kalyan is a rich man who falls in love with Gayathri and proposes to marry her. But Gayathri loves Kasi's friend Vishwa. Vishwa is employed with a rich businessman. Gayathri's brother wants her to marry Barath Kalyan but she does not agree and leaves the home with the hope of marrying Vishwa.

Vishwa and Gayathri decide to get married in a register office. Kasi also accompanies them. But Vishwa gets a phone call from his boss and leaves immediately. Vishwa requests to postpone the wedding plan as he has to travel immediately to the US for some work related engagements. Kasi takes Gayathri to his home as she has no one to help. Kasi behaves in a gentle manner with Gayathri and a mutual respect develops between them. Vishwa does not contact Gayathri for a few days and this worries Kasi.

It is revealed that Vishwa has plans to ditch Gayathri and marry his boss’ daughter with thoughts of becoming rich. Kasi and Gayathri reach the wedding hall to cancel Vishwa's wedding. But Vishwa degrades Gayathri accusing her having an illegitimate relationship with Kasi. Gayathri is angered and decides to break up with Vishwa. She also makes her mind to marry Kasi but Kasi refuses saying that this would make look as if the allegations made by Vishwa are true and requests her to marry Barath Kalyan who still truly loves her. Barath Kalyan and Gayathri are united.

== Cast ==
- Sathyaraj as Kaasi
- Devayani as Gayathri
- Ranjith as Vishwa
- Vadivelu as SP Telex Pandian IPS and 'Setup' Chellappa (dual roles)
- Kovai Sarala as Simran
- Chinni Jayanth
- Thalaivasal Vijay
- Devan
- Bharath Kalyan
- Pandu
- Mahanadhi Shankar
- Bonda Mani
- Jyothi Lakshmi
- Alphonsa
- Sembuli Jagan

== Production ==
The filming was held at Chennai, Ooty, Kodaikanal and Bangalore. The song "Koyambedu Kokila" was shot at AVM Studios.

== Soundtrack ==
Music was composed by Deva and released on Anak Audio.

All lyrics are written by Vaali.

Track listing
No.	Title	Singer(s)	Length
1.	"Anbudaiya Nanbanukku"	S. P. Balasubrahmanyam, Theni Kunjarammal, Deva	5:03
2.	"Ennama Kannu"	Deva	4:27
3.	"Kathirunthaal"	Ganga	1:25
4.	"Koyambedu Kokila"	Deva, Sabesh–Murali	4:46
5.	"Nalladhor Veenai"	Ganga	1:09
6.	"Thalaiva"	Harini	4:55
7.	"Naan Oru Pombala Rajini"	Anuradha Sriram, T. K. Kala	5:16
Total length:			27:01

== Critical reception ==
Savitha Padmanabhan of The Hindu wrote, "The performances throughout are convincing. This is a role written for Satyaraj and he is very good at what he does. Devyani too takes her role seriously and has put in a lot of effort. But Ranjith has nothing much to do. Vadivelu makes his presence known, and that too in a double role, but he is a bit irritating at times. The song sequences are eminently avoidable except perhaps the songs where the matinee idol MGR makes a brief appearance, thanks to graphics. There is nothing to write home about the music by Deva, while B. Kannan's camera work is functional. Except for these drawbacks, "Ennamma Kannu" is quite entertaining and enjoyable." Malini Mannath of Chennai Online wrote, "The director has kept his narration fairly interesting most of the time and the film moves at a fast pace. The Vadivelu comedy is at times hilarious. The late MGR dances here too with Devayani and Satyaraj, thanks to computer technology."

K. N. Vijiyan of New Straits Times wrote "Though the movie is almost obscene in the beginning, the story becomes stronger as it proceeds into the second half and manages to maintain our attention". Krishna Chidambaram of Kalki praised Sathyaraj's acting, Vadivelu's humour, dialogues, interesting presentation but panned Devayani's acting, her reason for loving Ranjith and Sathyaraj's act of sacrificing love. Indiainfo wrote, "Sathyaraj carries off the role beautifully and the film is funny because of his witty dialogue delivery. Vadivelu scores in the dual role of a pimp and a police inspector. Devyani too does her part well. Deva’s music is average while Kannan does a good job as a cinematographer. Sakti’s screenplay deserves a good pat". Dinakaran wrote, "Director Shakthi Chidambaram has very intelligibly put into use the acting potentials of Sathyaraj through his (the director's) knack of unique treatment of the story and dialogue punches". Cinesouth wrote, "Director Shakthi Chidambaram has mixed all the masala in a proper proportion to give a real hit movie".
