= Charlie Chaplin 2 =

2019 Indian action comedy film

- Directed by: Sakthi Chidambaram
- Written by: Sakthi Chidambaram
- Produced by: T. Siva
- Starring: Prabhu Deva; Nikki Galrani; Prabhu
- Narrated by: Shiva
- Cinematography: Soundarrajan
- Edited by: G. Sasikumar
- Music by: Amresh Ganesh
- Production company: Amma Creations
- Release date: 25 January 2019
- Country: India
- Language: Tamil

Charlie Chaplin 2 is a 2019 Indian Tamil-language action comedy film written and directed by Shakthi Chidambaram. The film stars Prabhu Deva, Nikki Galrani and Prabhu. The film is a sequel to the 2002 film Charlie Chaplin. The music for the film is scored by Amresh Ganesh. The film is produced by T. Siva under the production banner Amma Creations. The film was released on 25 January 2019 to negative reviews.

== Plot ==
A young groom jeopardises his upcoming wedding after sending an abusive message to his bride, while under the influence of alcohol. Upon realising his mistake, he struggles to make amends for it and save the wedding.

== Cast ==
- Prabhu Deva as Thiru
- Prabhu as Ramakrishnan
- Nikki Galrani as Sara
- Adah Sharma as "Psychology" Saara
- Vivek Prasanna as Dubai Raja
- Aravind Akash as Akash
- Chandhana Raj as Mahi
- T. Siva as Chidambaram
- Senthi Kumari as Thanga Lakshmi
- Ravi Mariya as Bullet Pushparaj
- Luthfudeen as "Mimicry" Manish
- Dev Gill as Smuggler
- Samir Kochhar as Cellphone Bazaar owner
- Crane Manohar as MLA
- Kavya Suresh as MLA's wife
- Chaams as Homosexual man
- Scissor Manohar as Bullet Pushparaj's assistant
- Velmurugan as Bullet Pushparaj's assistant
- Komal Sharma
- Amit Bhargav as Sara's sister's husband
- Ashvin Raja as Hotel worker
- Golisoda Seetha as Sumangali
- Senthil as Priest (guest appearance)

== Soundtrack ==
The soundtrack was composed by Amresh Ganesh. Senthil Ganesh and Rajalakshmi who won the finals of Vijay TV Super Singer sang their own song "Chinna Machan" for the film., which became a huge chartbuster. Prabhu Deva made his debut as a lyricist with the song "Ivala Romba". The soundtrack was released under the Saregama label.

Charlie Chaplin 2

Soundtrack album by Amresh Ganesh
- Released: 27 December 2018
- Genre: Soundtrack
- Length: 17:08
- Language: Tamil
- Label: Saregama India
- Producer: Amresh Ganesh

Amresh Ganesh chronology
Bhaskar Oru Rascal (2018)	Charlie Chaplin 2 (2018)	Pottu (2019)

Song	Singers	Lyrics
"Chinna Machan"	Senthil Ganesh, Rajalakshmi	Chella Thangaiah
"Ivala Romba"	Amrish	Prabhu Deva
"Mamu Mamu"		
"I Want To Marry You"	K. B. Mahadevan and K. Dasgupta	

== Release ==
Charlie Chaplin 2 was released on 25 January 2019.

== Marketing ==
The official trailer of the film was unveiled by director Karthik Subbaraj on 15 January 2019 on the eve of Thai Pongal.

== Reception ==
Thinkal Menon of The Times of India rated the film two-and-a-half out of five stars and wrote, "Though the movie provides laughs in certain sequences as expected, the logic goes for a toss several times. The number of songs, which make no impact, too, test the patience." S. Subhakeerthana of The Indian Express gave the film one-and-a-half out of five stars and wrote, "Charlie Chaplin 2, a wasted sequel, is carelessly written with a bad screenplay and outdated ‘jokes’." Sudhir Srinivasan of Cinema Express wrote, "Lazily done and insensitive, the film may not even go on to make for attractive television". Srinivasa Ramanujam of The Hindu wrote, "A comedy of errors that ends up eliciting only a few laughs".

Anjana Shekar of The News Minute wrote, "the jokes are so poorly written that it might want to make you exit the theatre immediately." Sreedhar Pillai of Firstpost wrote, "Basically the film is some comic situations put together which, on paper may have made the team laugh but execution on screen falls flat." Anupama Subramanian of Deccan Chronicle wrote, "Logic goes for a toss nearly throughout the entire proceedings. There seemed to be editing jumps as well. After a point, with so many characters walking in and out of each frame, we get a feeling as if we are watching a mega-serial."
