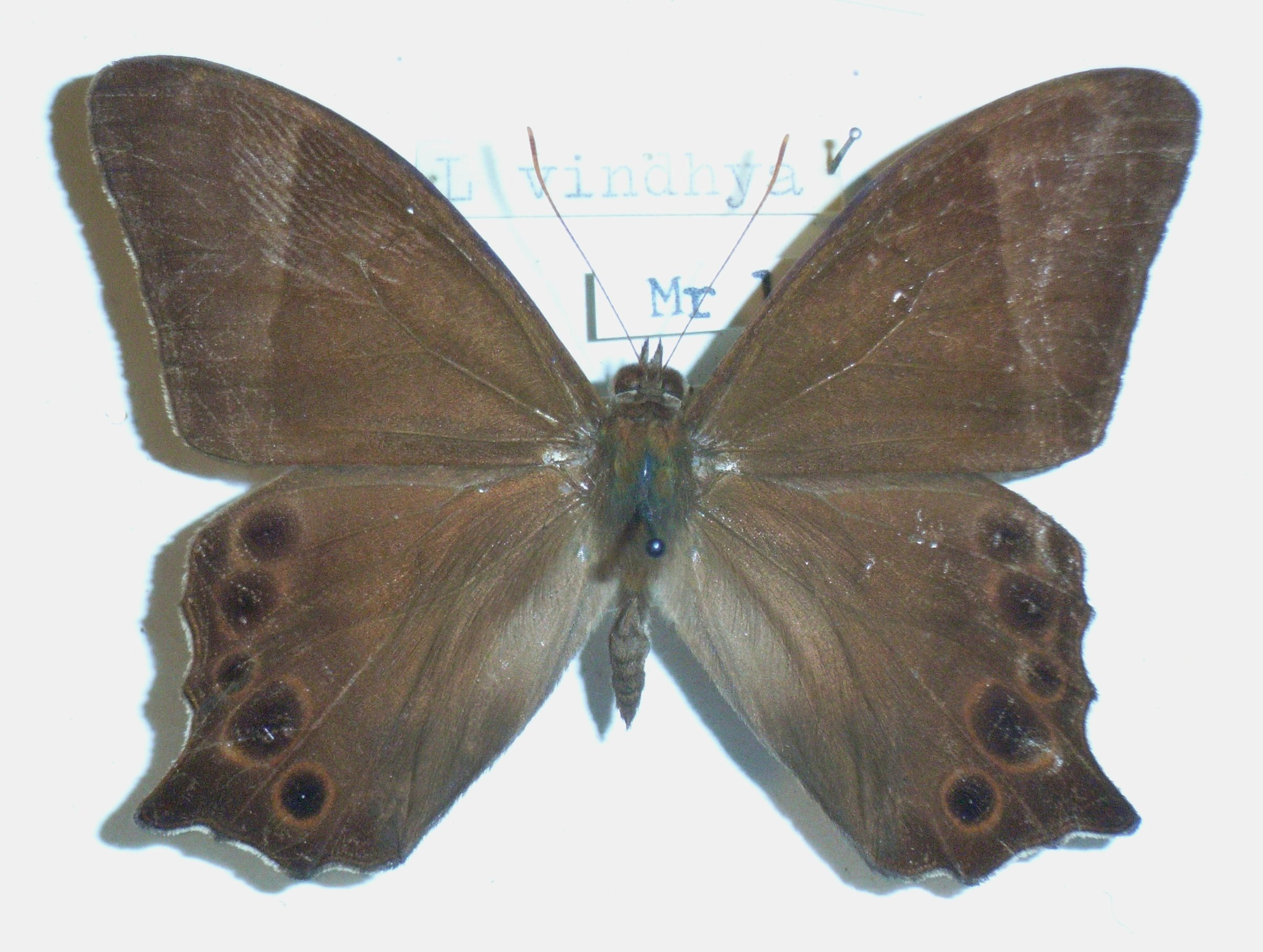

Scientific classification
- Domain: Eukaryota
- Kingdom: Animalia
- Phylum: Arthropoda
- Class: Insecta
- Order: Lepidoptera
- Family: Nymphalidae
- Genus: Lethe
- Species: L. vindhya

Binomial name
- Lethe vindhya (C. & R. Felder, 1859)

= Lethe vindhya =

Black forester

Species of butterfly

Lethe vindhya, the black forester, is a species of Satyrinae butterfly found in India and Indochina.

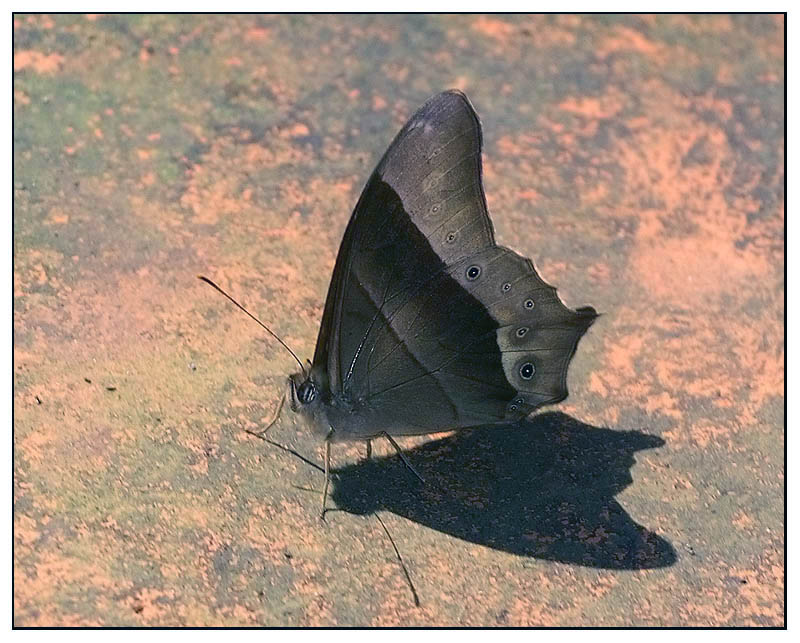
From North Vietnam

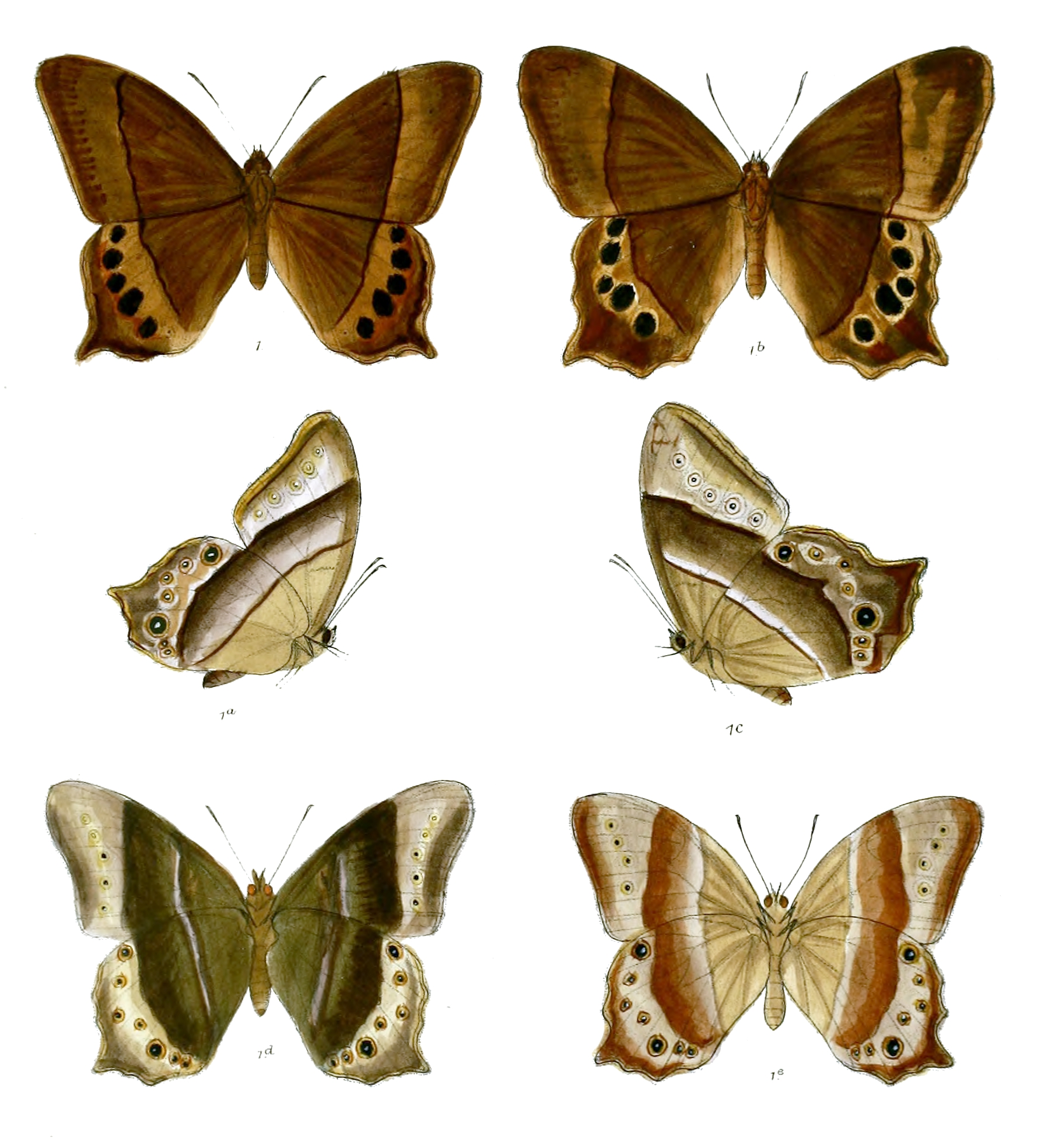

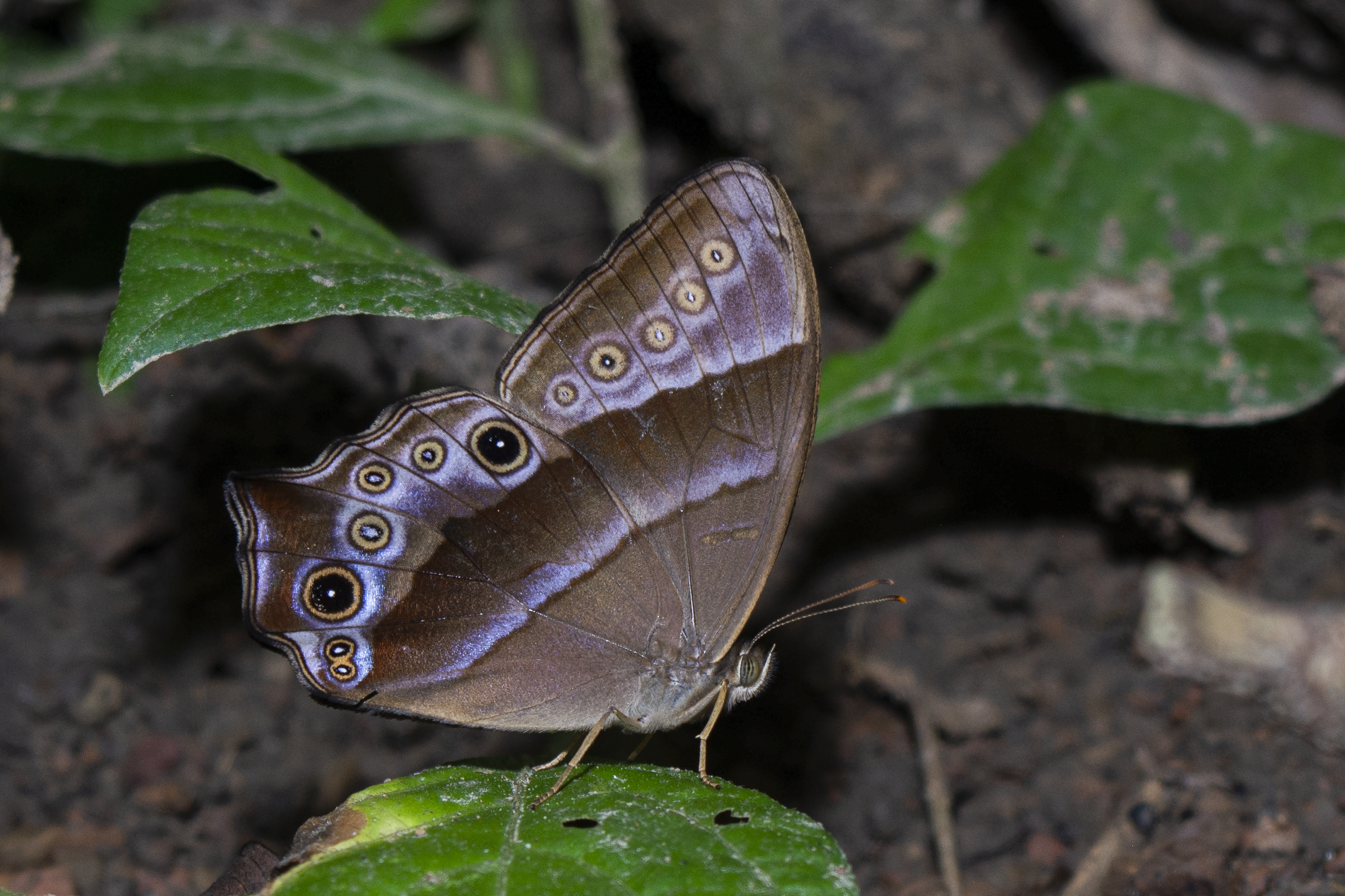
