= List of Tamil films of 2007 =

Prior to the amendment of Tamil Nadu Entertainments Tax Act 1939 on 22 July 2006, gross was 115 per cent of net for all films. Post-amendment, gross equalled net for films with pure Tamil titles. Commercial Taxes Department disclosed ₹16.35 crore in entertainment tax revenue for the year.

A list of films produced and released in the Tamil film industry in India in 2007 by release date:

== Box office collection ==
The following is the list of highest-grossing Tamil cinema films released in 2007.

Rank	Title	Production company	Worldwide gross
1	Sivaji	AVM Productions	₹148 crore
2	Pokkiri	Kanagarathna Movies	₹75 crore
3	Billa	Ananda Picture Circuit; Nigel Wick Zepher Studio	₹45 crore
4	Vel	Sree Rajakaalaiamman Medias	₹35 crore
5	Paruthiveeran	Teamwork Production House	₹32 crore
6	Unnale Unnale	Aascar Film	₹20 crore

== List of Tamil films ==
=== January—March ===
Opening		Title	Director	Cast	Studio	Ref
J A N	3	Kalakkura Chandru	Ravi-Raja	Karthik, Bhuvana, Pandiarajan, Urvashi		
J A N	12	Aalwar	Chella	Ajith Kumar, Asin		
J A N	12	Pokkiri	Prabhu Deva	Vijay, Asin, Prakash Raj, Vadivelu		
J A N	14	Thaamirabharani	Hari	Vishal, Bhanu, Nadhiya, Prabhu		
F E B	1	Veerasamy	T. Rajender	T. Rajender, Mumtaj, Meghna Naidu		
F E B	9	Deepavali	Ezhil	Jayam Ravi, Bhavana		
F E B	9	Pori	Subramaniya Siva	Jiiva, Pooja		
F E B	16	Agaram	T. Nagarajan	Nandha, Archana		
F E B	16	Lee	Prabu Solomon	Sibiraj, Nila, Prakash Raj		
F E B	16	Pachaikili Muthucharam	Gautham Vasudev Menon	Sarath Kumar, Jyothika, Andrea Jeremiah		
F E B	23	Mozhi	Radha Mohan	Prithviraj, Jyothika, Prakash Raj, Swarnamalya		
F E B	23	Paruthiveeran	Ameer	Karthi, Priyamani		
M A R	2	Muruga	R. T. Nesan	Ashok, Shruti Sharma, Vadivelu		
M A R	9	Muni	Raghava Lawrence	Raghava Lawrence, Vedhika, Rajkiran, Kovai Sarala		
M A R	9	Thirumagan	M. Rathnakumar	S. J. Surya, Meera Jasmine, Malavika, Ranjith		
M A R	16	Nanbanin Kadhali	G. Kicha	Kunal, Vikramaditya, Shivani Singh		
M A R	17	Sabari	Suresh	Vijayakanth, Jyothirmayi, Malavika		
M A R	23	Kuttrapathirikai	R. K. Selvamani	Ramki, Rahman, Roja, Ramya Krishnan		
M A R	23	Manikanda	Selva	Arjun, Jyothika		
M A R	30	Adavadi	V. S. Bharath Hanna	Sathyaraj, Radha		
M A R	30	Viyabari	Sakthi Chidambaram	S. J. Surya, Tamannaah, Namitha, Vadivelu, Prakash Raj		

=== April—June ===
Opening		Title	Director	Cast	Studio	Ref
A P R	5	Koodal Nagar	Seenu Ramasamy	Bharath, Bhavana, Sandhya		
A P R	12	Kaanal Neer	Chinni Jayanth	J. K. Rithesh, Manisha Chatterjee		
A P R	14	Maya Kannadi	Cheran	Cheran, Navya Nair		
A P R	14	Unnale Unnale	Jeeva	Vinay Rai, Sadha, Tanisha Mukherjee		
A P R	18	Madurai Veeran	Vincent Selva	Githan Ramesh, Saloni Aswani		
A P R	20	Mudhal Kanave	C. Balamurugan	Vikranth, Honey Rose		
A P R	20	Naan Avanillai	Selva	Jeevan, Sneha, Jyothirmayi, Namitha, Malavika, Keerthi Chawla		
A P R	27	Chennai 600028	Venkat Prabhu	Shiva, Jai, Nithin Sathya, Aravind Akash, Premji, Vijayalakshmi, Kristine Zedek		
A P R	27	Dhandayuthapani	Saravana Sakthi	S. Suresh Raja, Shivani Sri		
A P R	27	Parattai Engira Azhagu Sundaram	Suresh Krishna	Dhanush, Meera Jasmine		
M A Y	4	Achacho	V. S. Balray	Sri Hari, Varshini		
M A Y	4	Kasu Irukkanum	R. Kumaran, Priyavan	K. Bhagyaraj, Vishwa, J. Livingston		
M A Y	4	Niram	S. K. Krishna	Mani, Sridhar, Raju, Sindhuri		
M A Y	4	Periyar	Gnana Rajasekaran	Sathyaraj, Jyothirmayi, Khushbu		
M A Y	11	Ninaithaley	Viswas Sundar	Suchindra, Nargis Bagheri, Santhoshi		
M A Y	11	Thiru Ranga	Ravi Bhargavan	Santosh, Ankitha		
M A Y	14	Karuppusamy Kuththagaithaarar	A. Govindamoorthy	Karan, Meenakshi, Vadivelu		
M A Y	18	Ninaithu Ninaithu Parthen	Manikandan	Vikranth, Ashita		
M A Y	25	Paali	A. Jesudoss	Sre, Rimpi Das		
M A Y	25	Nee Naan Nila	M. P. S. Sivakumar	R. V. Bharathan, London Ravi, Meghna		
M A Y	25	Rasigar Mandram	Pugazhendhi Thangaraj	Uma, Ganesh, Gokul Krishna		
J U N	1	Pirappu	L. V. Ilangovan	Prabha, Karthika Adaikalam, Priya Mohan		
J U N	15	Sivaji	Shankar	Rajinikanth, Shriya Saran, Vivek, Suman		
J U N	29	Thullal	Praveen Kanth	Praveen Kanth, Gurleen Chopra, Sonika		

=== July—September ===
Opening		Title	Director	Cast	Studio	Ref
J U L	6	Ennai Paar Yogam Varum	M. Jameen Raj	Mansoor Ali Khan, Manju		
J U L	13	Maa Madurai	K. K. Krishnan	Vaasan Karthik, Mithuna		
J U L	20	Kireedam	A. L. Vijay	Ajith Kumar, Trisha Krishnan, Rajkiran		
J U L	27	Thee Nagar	Thirumalai	Karan, Udhayathara		
J U L	27	Veerappu	Badri	Sundar C, Gopika, Prakash Raj		
A U G	3	Thottal Poo Malarum	P. Vasu	Sakthi Vasu, Gowri Munjal, Rajkiran, Vadivelu		
A U G	10	Aarya	Balasekaran	R. Madhavan, Bhavana, Vadivelu		
A U G	10	En Uyirinum Melana	K. R. Jaya	Ajith Chander, Radhika Menon		
A U G	10	Pallikoodam	Thangar Bachan	Narain, Sneha, Shriya Reddy, Seeman		
A U G	17	Anbu Thozhi	L. G. Ravichandran	Thol Thirumavalavan, Prabhu, Preethi Varma		
A U G	24	Tholaipesi	K. Paneer Selvam	Vikramaditya, Priyanka Nair, Divya		
S E P	2	Ammuvagiya Naan	Padmamagan	R. Parthiban, Bharathi		
S E P	2	Oru Ponnu Oru Paiyan	Naren Deivanayagam	Sandeep, Roopasree, Shubha Poonja		
S E P	2	Urchagam	Ravichandran	Nandha, Sherin		
S E P	7	Cheena Thaana 001	T. P. Gajendran	Prasanna, Sheela, Vadivelu		
S E P	7	Marudhamalai	Suraj	Arjun, Nila, Vadivelu		
S E P	7	Thoovanam	Harichandran, Newton	Adhitya, Nethra		
S E P	14	Inimey Nangathan	Venky Babu	M. S. Bhaskar, Pandu		
S E P	14	Manase Mounama	R. Senthamil Arasu	Ravikanth, S. T. Tamilarasan, Sanya		
S E P	14	Satham Podathey	Vasanth	Prithviraj, Padmapriya, Nithin Sathya		
S E P	14	Thirutham	Ponraman	Harikumar, Priyanka Nair, Mansi Pritam		
S E P	14	Vasantham Vanthachu	K. Viveka Bharathi	Venkat Prabhu, Nanditha Jennifer		
S E P	21	Nam Naadu	Suresh	Sarath Kumar, Karthika		
S E P	21	Nenjai Thodu	Rajkannan	Gemini, Lakshmi Rai		
S E P	21	Piragu	N. Jeeva	Hamsavardhan, Keerthi Chawla, Sunitha Verma		
S E P	21	Sivi	K. R. Sendhilnathan	Yogi, Jayashree Rao, Anuja Iyer		
S E P	28	Malaikottai	Boopathy Pandian	Vishal, Priyamani		
S E P	28	Meendum Chandramathi	Kamalraj	Gopal, Chandramathi		
S E P	28	Mudhal Mudhalai	Benjamin	Mahesh, Madhu Sandha		
S E P	28	Vegam	K. R. Udhayashankar	Prabhu, Ashwin Sekar, Archana		

=== October—December ===
Opening		Title	Director	Cast	Studio	Ref
O C T	5	Kattradhu Thamizh	Ram	Jiiva, Anjali		
O C T	5	Pasupathi c/o Rasakkapalayam	K. Selva Bharathy	Ranjith, Sindhu Tolani, Meghna Nair		
O C T	5	Sringaram	Saradha Ramanathan	Aditi Rao Hydari, Manoj K. Jayan, Hamsa Moily		
O C T	5	Thavam	Sakthi Paramesh	Arun Vijay, Arpitha, Vandhana Gupta		
O C T	5	Veeramum Eeramum	Sanjay Ram	Saravanan, Deepan Chakravarthy, Sonika, Sanjay Ram, Dhanya Mary Varghese		
O C T	12	Naalaiya Pozhuthum Unnodu	K. Moorthy Kannan	Prithvi Rajan, Karthika		
O C T	12	Niyabagam Varuthe	K. S. Raj	Venkat Prabhu, S. P. B. Charan, Suha		
O C T	19	Ippadikku En Kadhal	B. Kishore	Ravi Kalyan, Thanuja		
O C T	26	Chandiramathi	V. S. Kamalraj	Datshan, Deetsha		
N O V	8	Agra	Chithrai Selvan	Vikas, Anjali		
N O V	8	Azhagiya Tamil Magan	Bharathan	Vijay, Shriya Saran, Namitha		
N O V	8	Kannamoochi Yenada	V. Priya	Sathyaraj, Prithviraj, Sandhya, Radhika		
N O V	8	Machakaaran	Tamilvannan	Jeevan, Kamna Jethmalani		
N O V	8	Polladhavan	Vetrimaaran	Dhanush, Divya Spandana, Daniel Balaji		
N O V	8	Vel	Hari	Suriya, Asin, Kalabhavan Mani		
N O V	30	Kelvikuri	Jailani	Jailani, Sona Heiden, Preethi Varma		
N O V	30	Onbadhu Roobai Nottu	Thangar Bachan	Sathyaraj, Archana, Nassar, Rohini		
N O V	30	Oram Po	Pushkar-Gayathri	Arya, Pooja, Lal, John Vijay		
N O V	30	Rameswaram	S. Selvam	Jiiva, Bhavana		
D E C	7	Evano Oruvan	Nishikant Kamat	R. Madhavan, Sangeetha		
D E C	7	Kalloori	Balaji Shakthivel	Akhil, Tamannaah		
D E C	14	Billa	Vishnuvardhan	Ajith Kumar, Nayantara, Namitha, Prabhu		
D E C	14	Mirugam	Samy	Aadhi, Padmapriya, Sona Heiden		
D E C	21	Kanna	Anand	Raja, Sheela, Prakash Raj		
D E C	21	Puli Varudhu	G. V. Kumar	Githan Ramesh, Mallika Kapoor		
D E C	28	Pazhaniappa Kalloori	R. Pavan	Pratheep, Arjumman Mughal, Madhu Shalini, Akshaya Rao		
D E C	28	Yaaruku Yaaro	Joe Stanley	Sam Anderson, Varnika, Jothi		

The following films also released in 2007, though the release date remains unknown.

Title	Director	Cast	Music director
377	Amrit Raj Gnanam	Amrit Raj Gnanam, Balaji, Mukesh, Narayanan	
Chella Thiruda	P. S. Dharan	S. T. Tamilarasan, Neepa	Nagha
Nizhal	Bhadri	Aswin, Kamala Deepika	'Gaana Sundar' Arun
Thiruvakkarai Sri Vakrakaliamman	K. Gnanam	Roja, Anjana, Desi, Thadi Balaji, Kadhal Sukumar	Mr. X

== Awards ==
Category/organization	Filmfare Awards South 12 July 2008	Tamil Nadu State Film Awards 30 September 2009	Vijay Awards 3 May 2008
Best Film	Paruthiveeran	Sivaji	Paruthiveeran
Best Director	Ameer; Paruthiveeran	Thangar Bachan; Onbadhu Roobai Nottu	Vetrimaaran; Polladhavan
Best Actor	Karthi; Paruthiveeran	Rajinikanth; Sivaji	Sathyaraj; Onbadhu Roobai Nottu
Best Actress	Priyamani; Paruthiveeran	Jyothika; Mozhi	Priyamani; Paruthiveeran
Best Music Director	A. R. Rahman; Sivaji	Vidyasagar; Mozhi	A. R. Rahman; Sivaji
