= Anbe Anbe =

- DVD cover
- Directed by: Mani Bharathi
- Written by: Raja S. (dialogue)
- Screenplay by: Mani Bharathi
- Story by: Raja S.
- Produced by: M. Saravanan; M. Balasubramanian; M. S. Guhan; B. Gurunath
- Starring: Shaam; Sharmili
- Cinematography: Ramnath Shetty
- Edited by: V. Jaishankar
- Music by: Bharadwaj
- Production company: AVM Productions
- Release date: 1 May 2003
- Running time: 139 minutes
- Country: India
- Language: Tamil

Anbe Anbe (transl. Dear, Dear) is a 2003 Indian Tamil-language romantic drama film directed by Mani Bharathi. The film stars Shaam and Sharmili, while an ensemble supporting cast includes Vivek, Yugendran, M. N. Nambiar, Manorama, and Santhoshi. The music was composed by Bharadwaj. The film released on 1 May 2003 and opened to mixed reviews from critics. The film's plot is loosely based on the Hindi film Hum Aapke Hain Koun..! (1994).

== Plot ==
An extended family that includes two grandparents named Mahendra Bhoopathy and Vishali, their two sons and one daughter, and four grandchildren (including Cheenu and Shiva), and others come together for Mahendra Bhoopathy's 80th birthday. Mahendra Bhoopathy's and Vishali's daughter comes to see them after a long time. Their granddaughter has the name as her grandmother: Vishali. Issues arise due to greed from the son-in-law, his brother, and Cheenu's birth mother to get more than their appropriated share of the property. Further chaos ensues when the evil Shiva falls in love with the granddaughter Vishali, whom Cheenu is in love with. How the family is reunited and the problems are solved forms the rest of the plot.

== Cast ==
- Shaam as Cheenu
- Sharmili as Vishali
- Vivek as Cheenu's uncle
- Yugendran as Shiva
- M. N. Nambiar as Mahendra Bhoopathy
- Manorama as Vishali
- Manivannan as Mahendra Bhoopathy's son-in-law's brother
- Thalaivasal Vijay as Seenu's Father
- Poovilangu Mohan as Shiva's father
- Senthil as Punniyakodi
- Sindhu as a servant
- Ramya Krishnan as a dancer in "Vasthu Sasthiram"
- Santhoshi as Ramya
- Vanitha Krishnachandran as Mahendra Bhoopathy's daughter
- Nithya as Sivagami
- Janavi as Mahalakshmi,Shiva's mother
- Archana Reddy as Cheenu's adoptive mother
- Scissor Manohar as a beggar
- Mohan V. Raman as Mahendra Bhoopathy's son-in-law
- M. S. Bhaskar as Mahendra Bhoopathy's son-in-law
- Master Naresh Sha as child Cheenu
- Bonda Mani as Bonda Mani

== Production ==
Manibharati, who worked as an assistant to Mani Ratnam, Saran and Vasanth, announced that he was making a love story for AVM Productions. Shaam was signed on to play the lead role, which was initially titled as Romeo and Juliet. Actress Priyamani was approached for the project but she turned down the offer, meaning that Sharmelee was signed to play the lead role. The film's story was written by Sanjay Ram who went on to make films like Thoothukudi and Aadu Puli Aattam, he was credited as S. Raja. Shamelee, who had been studying for a computer degree, earlier signed Aasai Aasaiyai and the Telugu film Taarak before signing this film. Since the film was set in a large house with family, the unit located a bungalow at Pazhayakottai near Kangeyam where the film was shot and the filming was completed within 72 days.

== Soundtrack ==
The soundtrack was composed by Bharadwaj. The soundtrack was released under the label of AVM audio. The audio cassettes were sold at the rate of ₹20 and CDs at the rate of 60. A preview show featuring only the songs were shown to journalists from which they were told to choose their favourite song.

Song	Singers	Lyrics
"Anbe Anbe"	Hariharan, Sadhana Sargam	Palani Bharathi
"Idhudhan Santhoshama"	S. P. Balasubrahmanyam	Kalaikumar
"Malayala Karaiyoram"	Karthik	Na. Muthukumar
"Rettai Jadai Rakkamma"	T. L. Maharajan, Manikka Vinayagam, Swarnalatha, Srinivas, Manorama	Na. Muthukumar
"Roobanottil"	KK, Anuradha Sriram	Kabilan
"Vasthu Sasthiram"	S. P. Balasubrahmanyam, Malgudi Subha	Vaali

== Reception ==
Sify wrote "There is nothing new in the story and director Manibharathi has not been able to tell this weak story with conviction". Malini Mannath of Chennai Online opined that "Directed by debutant Mani Bharati, the film is an average entertainer, that can hardly boast of any freshness in the scripting or narrative style". Visual Dasan of Kalki praised the acting of Yugendran and Vivek's humour but panned the acting of Sharmilee and added though the inclusion of item songs in a family-oriented film feels unnecessary, Mani Bharathi's brisk direction keeps us edge of the seat till the end. Malathi Rangarajan of The Hindu wrote "At a time when the break up of the joint family system is almost complete, flicks such as these with a huge family of aunts, cousins, grandpa and the like are anachronistic. Yet scriptwriter and director Manibharati, takes you into a home where you witness an affectionate drama unfold — so what if there is nothing new about it. All the same, the real villain of the entire cinematic tale is the rather ludicrous climax". Cinesouth wrote "AVM might be happy about making a family based film after a masala film like 'Gemini', but they better not feel too smug about it. The film is nothing spectacular to talk about". The film failed commercially at box-office.
