= Maragatha Veenai =

Maragatha Veenai may refer to:

- Maragatha Veenai (film), a 1986 Indian film
- Maragatha Veenai (TV series), a 2014 Indian soap opera
