= Udhaya =

Udhaya may refer to:

- Udhaya (film), a 2004 Indian Tamil-language action film starring Vijay
- Udhaya (actor), Indian Tamil actor
