= Tenali Rama (film) =

2006 Indian film

- DVD cover
- Directed by: Magadi Pandu
- Produced by: S. V. Babu
- Starring: Ramesh Aravind; Jaggesh
- Cinematography: Ananaji Nagaraj
- Music by: R. P. Patnaik
- Release date: 29 November 2006
- Country: India
- Language: Kannada

Tenali Rama is a 2006 Indian Kannada-language comedy film directed by Magadi Pandu and starring Ramesh Aravind and Jaggesh as the titular characters. It is a remake of the Malayalam film Nadodikattu. The film released to mixed reviews from critics, but was a box office success.

== Cast ==
- Ramesh Aravind as Tenali
- Jaggesh as Rama
- Komal
- Rangayana Raghu
- Dharma
- Deepu
- Santhoshi
- Manasi
- Kazan Khan
- Doddanna
- R. G. Vijayasarathy
- M. S. Umesh
- Karibasavaiah
- Bank Janardhan
- Mandeep Roy
- Tennis Krishna
- Vaijanath Biradar
- B. V. Radha

== Production ==
After the success of Honeymoon Express, director Magadi Pandu and producer SV Babu teamed up again for this film.

== Soundtrack ==
Music by R. P. Patnaik.

- "Hoye Mama" - Manu, Karthik
- "Madaithe Madaithe" - Karthik, Sujatha
- "Thenali Rama" - Malgudi Subha, R. P. Patnaik
- "Neene Neene" - Kunal Ganjawala
- "Oh Myna" - Manu, Karthik

== Reception ==
R. G. Vijayasarathy of Rediff.com opined that "Tenali Rama could have been a continuous laugh riot like the Malayalam original, but the script lets the film down. Ramesh and Jaggesh have tried their best to salvage the film, complementing each other very well". A critic from IANS said that "Tenali Rama is an ordinary film which could have been better presented".
