= Poova Thalaiya =

Poova Thalaiya or Thalaya may refer to:

- Poova Thalaiya (1969 film), an Indian Tamil-language comedy film
- Poova Thalaiya (2011 film), an Indian Tamil-language action film
- Poova Thalaya (TV series), a 2023 Indian Tamil-language television series
