= Kalakalappu (2001 film) =

2001 film

- Directed by: Vishwa
- Written by: Kamalesh Kumar
- Produced by: A. L. Azhagappan
- Starring: Napoleon; Udhaya; Jaya Seal; Vijayalakshmi
- Cinematography: Rajarajan
- Edited by: Lancy Mohan
- Music by: Deva
- Release date: 27 July 2001
- Country: India
- Language: Tamil

Kalakalappu is a 2001 Indian Tamil-language romantic comedy film directed by Vishwa and produced by A. L. Azhagappan. The film stars Napoleon, with Udhaya, Jaya Seal and Vijayalakshmi in supporting roles. It was released on 27 July 2001.

== Plot ==
Kuzhandhaivel alias Velu is a rich landlord in Courtallam leading a happy life with his wife Thilaka and daughter Pooja. Thilaka is none other than Velu’s niece. Velu's widowed elder sister (who is also Thilaka's mother) and Thilaka's younger sister Divya also live with them. Divya falls in love with her classmate Karna who is a rich man based out of Chennai. To win Velu's heart, Karna comes to Courtallam and works as a servant in Velu's home. Divya informs the truth about Karna and her love to Thilaka for which she agrees. But she hides this to Velu and waits for the right moment to disclose the truth.

One day, during heavy rain, Thilaka accidentally steps over a wire and passes away due to electric shock. Velu is devastated due to his wife's death. Thilaka's mother proposes to have Velu marry Divya, so that he can start a fresh life for which Velu doesn't agree. However, everyone in the family convinces him. Divya is shocked knowing the wedding plans between her and Velu. Karna calms down Divya.

There arrives Mini (Uma) who happens to be the classmate of Karna and Divya. Mini informs Divya that Karna is a womanizer and accuses him of having a relationship with her. Divya doesn't trust Mini, but is surprised to learn that Mini is pregnant. Divya breaks up with Karna and decides to marry Velu itself. Accidentally, Velu learns of the love affair between Karna and Divya following which Divya tells Velu about the real identity of Karna. This infuriates Velu, so he sends his henchmen to retrieve Karna, so that Karna can be married to Mini. Karna refuses to marry Mini for which Velu’s henchmen beat Karna. Now Mini comes to rescue and informs the truth. Actually, Mini is a very good friend of Karna and she is already married to someone else. Karna requested Mini to help him breakup with Divya, so that Divya can marry Velu as per elders' wishes. Everyone understands the good nature of Karna and decides to have him marry Divya. In the end, Karna marries Divya.

== Cast ==
- Napoleon as Kuzhandhaivel
- Udhaya as Karna
- Jaya Seal as Thilaka
- Vijayalakshmi as Divya
- Uma as Mini
- Ramesh Khanna as Sreenivasan (Mittai)
- Ponnambalam as Kozhandha
- Sukumar as Kozhandha's Henchman
- Scissor Manohar as Photographer
- Khaja Sheriff
- Vimal as Karna's College Mate (uncredited)
- Kottachi (uncredited)

== Soundtrack ==
The soundtrack was by Deva.

Song	Singer(s)	Lyrics	Duration
"Amrutha Kadalea"	Naveen, Sushmitha	Na. Muthukumar	05:18
"Bubblu Bubblu"	Sabesh, Jayalakshmi	Kalidasan	04:32
"Meesakara Meesakara"	Anuradha Sriram	Kasthuri Raja	05:08
"Ottava Sinungi"	Krishnaraj, Anuradha Sriram	Pa. Vijay	04:59
"Pongalukku Vangithanda"	Krishnaraj, S. Sathya	Kalidasan	04:44

== Reception ==
Malini Mannath of Chennai Online wrote that "The film has nothing much going for it. Its weak script and listless narrative style makes viewing it seem a journey longer that it actually is!" Screen appreciated Vishwa's direction and Rajarajan's cinematography but criticised the music as "loud".
