= Meghna Nair =

Indian actress

- Born: Meghaa Nair; 1988 or 1989 (age 36–37); Alappuzha, Kerala, India
- Occupation: Actor
- Years active: 2008-2012

Meghna Nair is an Indian actress who has appeared in Tamil and Malayalam films.

== Career ==
Aged 18, Meghaa Nair first began shooting for Thangam (2008), portraying the role of the lead actress paired opposite Sathyaraj. She portrayed Sathyaraj's wife in the film, and wore make-up to present her beyond her real age. She subsequently featured in films including Pasupathi c/o Rasakkapalayam (2007) in Vivek's comedy track and Poova Thalaiya (2011) as a prostitute, before landing a role in Siva's Siruthai (2011) as a police officer. Siva had chosen her after being impressed with some promotional stills from her film Nellai Santhippu (2012), and Megha's height was also a factor in convincing the director to cast her in the film. Featuring alongside Karthi and Tamannaah, Siruthai remains Megha's highest profile work to date. The actress changed her stage name from Megha Nair to Meghna Nair in June 2011, hoping to garner further film offers. Several of her films in the late 2000s and early 2010s were shelved midst production, including Anish's Aadhikkam, Sanjay Ram's Sivamayam opposite Shaam and the female-centric film, Manmadha Rajyam, which saw her work alongside actresses Akshaya, Keerthi Chawla, Sanghavi and Tejashree.

In 2010, she began appearing in Malayalam films and appeared alongside Suresh Gopi in Ringtone (2010) and Dileep in Mr. Marumakan (2012). She has appeared in a TV Serial titled "Geethanjali" aired on Surya TV.She also participated in "Nestle Munch Stars" which was a celebrity reality show on Asianet.

== Filmography ==
Year	Film	Role	Language	Notes
2005	Bharathchandran I.P.S.	Lekha	Malayalam	
2005	Hai	Thriptha	Malayalam	
2005	Unakkaga	Thriptha	Tamil	
2005	OK Chacko Cochin Mumbai	Nanditha	Malayalam	
2006	Out of Syllabus	Priya	Malayalam	
2007	Pasupathi c/o Rasakkapalayam	Savithri	Tamil	
2008	Thangam	Meenakshi	Tamil	
2008	Thodakkam	Nancy	Tamil	
2008	Deepavali	Sirisha	Telugu	
2010	Ringtone	Meera	Malayalam	
2011	Siruthai	Jhansi	Tamil	
2011	Poova Thalaiya	Rekha	Tamil	
2011	Killadi Raman	Meera	Malayalam	
2012	Mr. Marumakan	Minmini	Malayalam	
2012	Nellai Santhippu	Lalitha	Tamil	
2012	Kaathalichu Paar	Thenmozhi	Tamil	

=== Television ===
- Nestle Munch Stars (Asianet)
- Geethanjali (Surya TV) as Gowri Parvathy
- Yakshiyum Njanum (Telefilm)
