= Gowravargal =

- DVD cover
- Directed by: Sanjay Ram
- Written by: Sanjay Ram
- Produced by: Ma. Paramasivam
- Starring: Sathyaraj; Vignesh; Ranjith; Monica
- Cinematography: Leo
- Edited by: K. M. Riyas
- Music by: Dhina
- Production company: Cine Screens
- Distributed by: Cine Screens
- Release date: 15 October 2010
- Country: India
- Language: Tamil

Gowravargal (transl. Honors) is a 2010 Indian Tamil-language action film written and directed by Sanjay Ram and produced by Ma. Paramasivam. The film stars Sathyaraj, Vignesh, and Monica, while Ranjith and Kuyili play supporting roles. The music was composed by Dhina. The film was released to poor reviews and poor collections on 15 October 2010.

== Plot ==
Ganesan (Vignesh) is an irresponsible youth in a village. He promises his mother (Kuyili) that he would be good and start earning. He gets a job where he bashes a few wrong-doers. This impresses a do-gooder and don named Thondaiman (Sathyaraj), who urges Ganesan to join him for work. Thondaiman is respected a lot, for he provides justice to people in his own way. People in case of crisis approach him and not the police. Ganesan, impressed by Thondaiman's ways, develops an affinity with him and even decides to give his life for him. Meanwhile, Ganesan falls in love with Poonkodi (Monica). A turn of events leaves a local minister's son going crazy behind her. Enters a police officer (Ranjith), who plays spoilsport in their romance. He threatens Thondaiman and hatches a conspiracy to ensure that Thondaiman and Ganesan part ways, but things happen otherwise.

== Cast ==
- Sathyaraj as Thondaiman
- Vignesh as Ganesan
- Ranjith as Police Officer
- Monica as Poongodi
- Kuyili as Ganesan's mother
- Bhanu Chander as Bhagavan
- Yuvarani as Thondaiman's wife
- Ramesh Khanna
- Aryan
- Azhagan Thamizhmani
- Sri Kala
- Alex
- Manoj Kumar
- Sachu

== Soundtrack ==
The music was composed by Dhina.

Gowravargal

Soundtrack album by Dhina
- Released: 2010
- Genre: Feature film soundtrack
- Producer: Dhina

Dhina chronology
Thambi Arjuna (2010)	Gowravargal (2010)	Vallakottai (2010)

No.	Song	Singers	Lyrics
1	"Aaha Soka Vachan"	Saindhavi, Harish Raghavendra	Ilaya Kamban
2	"Bramastharam"	Sirkazhi G. Sivachidambaram	Sanjay Ram
3	"Gowravargal Theme"	Instrumental	Sanjay Ram
4	"Manjanathil Ilai"	Manikka Vinayagam, Malathy Lakshman	Sanjay Ram
5	"Nandu Pudi"	Suchitra, Rahul Nambiar	Sanjay Ram
6	"Nesama Ninacha" I	Saindhavi	Sanjay Ram
7	"Nesama Ninacha" II	Aalai	Sanjay Ram
8	"Shethram Guruthram"	S. P. Balasubrahmanyam, Anupamaa	Sanjay Ram
9	"Thaaiya Pola"	Srimathumitha, Saindhavi	Sanjay Ram

== Reception ==
A critic from The Hindu wrote that "Gowravargal could have been a gripping fare if protractions had been avoided — they haven't".
