= Penngal =

- Directed by: Raj Marudhu
- Written by: Raj Marudhu
- Produced by: Adya Global Visions
- Starring: Akash; Divyasree; Santhoshi; Santhana Bharathi
- Cinematography: Harinath
- Edited by: A. Sreekar Prasad
- Music by: Bharadwaj
- Production company: Adya Global Visions
- Release date: 8 December 2000
- Country: India
- Language: Tamil

Penngal (transl. Women) is a 2000 Indian Tamil-language drama film directed by Raj Marudhu. The film stars Akash and Divyasree, with Santhoshi and Santhana Bharathi in supporting roles. Featuring music composed by Bharadwaj, the film was released on 8 December 2000.

== Plot ==
A mother hides her daughter from the village pimp by enrolling her in an orphanage. When the daughter grows older, she goes back to the village to save other girls with the help of a reporter.

== Cast ==
- Akash as Bharath Nageswaran
- Divyasree as Kaveri
- Santhoshi as Amudhavalli
- Santhana Bharathi
- Manivannan
- Ashwini
- Sharmili
- S. N. Parvathy
- Vichithra

== Production ==
The producers of the film were unhappy after actress Divyasree broke an exclusivity contract and she signed on for a film opposite actor Murali amid production.

== Soundtrack ==
The music composed by Bharadwaj, with lyrics by Snehan.

Song	Singers	Length
Kannukulla Pallanguzhi	Bharadwaj, Ganga	03:41
Malare Maranthuvidu	K. S. Chithra	02:03
Manasengum Mazhai	Sujatha, O. S. Arun	05:32
Mella Mella Vidinthathe	S. P. Balasubrahmanyam	05:52
Penne Nimirnthu Vidu	Srinivas	05:05
Penne Penne Arivaya	Anuradha Sriram	05:02

== Reception ==
Savitha Padmanabhan from The Hindu wrote, "films such as Penngal are required to make us a little more conscious of the social problems but they should be made with a little more care and sensitivity". She added, "one must commend the director for taking on such a theme", as "he brings to focus every aspect of these women's miserable existence - the desperation and dejection on the faces when a son is born, the fear when their young daughter is forcefully 'readied' for the 'occasion', the poverty and the diseases and the ostracism from the rest of the world". Visual Dasan of Kalki praised the director for taking up social issue in his debut film also praised sharp dialogues and Bharadwaj's music but panned Divya's acting and also felt the film has documentary feel in places. Malini Mannath of Chennai Online wrote, "It's a film that comes like a whiff of fresh air. Different in concept and narrative style. The scenes handled with sensitivity, the lines provocative and meaningful. The performances are well co-ordinated".
