= Trishna Pritam =

- Born: Kochi
- Other name: Mansi Pritam
- Education: J.D. Women's College
- Occupation: Actress
- Years active: 2004–present

Trishna Pritam (formerly known as Mansi Pritam) is an Indian actress who predominantly works in Tamil, Hindi, Kannada and Telugu-language films.

== Early life and career ==
Trishna Pritam was born in Kochi and grew up in Goa, Mumbai and Patna. She studied Home Science at J.D. Women's College. She also completed a Master of Arts in Performing Arts with a focus in Kathak. While in Mumbai, she made her lead debut with the Hindi film Garma Garam (2005) before starring in the Telugu film Seenugadu Chiranjeevi Fan later that same year. She made her Hindi debut with Gauri: The Unborn (2007) after she was spotted while shooting for a song in Kerala. She worked on the play Muskuraiye Aap Lucknow Main Hain, which was directed by Imran Khan in Lucknow in 2019.

== Filmography ==
| Year | Title | Role | Language | Notes |
|---|---|---|---|---|
| 2004 | Gowri | | Telugu | Special appearance in the song "Jigi Jigi Jinka" |
| 2005 | Garma Garam | Sapna | Hindi | |
| 2005 | Seenugadu Chiranjeevi Fan | Swati | Telugu | |
| 2007 | Thirutham | Priya | Tamil | |
| 2007 | Gauri: The Unborn | Neena | Hindi | |
| 2008 | Ezhuthiyatharadi | Sanjini | Tamil | |
| 2008 | Ellam Avan Seyal | Serena | Tamil | |
| 2009 | Bellary Naga | | Kannada | |
| 2011 | Aacharya | | Kannada | |
| 2012 | Delhi Eye | | Hindi | |
| 2014 | Agraja | | Kannada | Special appearance in the song "Mysore Wadeyaravaru" |
| 2014 | Pulippu Inippu | | Tamil | |
