= Aadu Puli Aattam (2006 film) =

- Directed by: Sanjay Ram
- Written by: Sanjay Ram
- Produced by: Mayas
- Starring: Mani Prakash; Vennila; Rekasri
- Cinematography: Leo D.
- Edited by: R. T. Annadurai
- Music by: Praveen Mani
- Production company: Opa Creations
- Release date: 15 December 2006
- Country: India
- Language: Tamil

Aadu Puli Aattam (transl. the lambs and tigers game) is a 2006 Indian Tamil-language action film directed by Sanjay Ram and produced by Opa Creations. The film stars Mani Prakash, Vennila and Rekasri. It was released on 15 December 2006.

== Cast ==
- Mani Prakash as Mandhiran
- Vennila as Gayathri
- Rekasri
- Damodhara Raju as Sadayan
- Sudhakar Vasanth as Vellaithurai
- Poovilangu Mohan as Gayathri's father

== Production ==
Sanjay Ram made a series of quick action films in the mid-2000s, and moved on to his next film, Iyakkam (2008), before the release of Aadu Puli Aattam. The film was said to be loosely based on ex-rowdy from Tirunelveli, named Sadayan.

== Reception ==
Malini Mannath of Chennai Online wrote, "in depicting the game between the hunter and the hunted, the debutant director is focused, and moves his narration at a racy pace", and added that "the director has chosen his cast well, with each character, even the ones in smaller roles, suitably placed".

Lajjavathi of Kalki wrote director Sanjay Ram, who wanted to tell a compelling story, did not prepare the right screenplay for it.
