= Ilaignar Ani =

- Poster
- Directed by: K. R. Selvaraj
- Screenplay by: K. R. Selvaraj
- Story by: Radha Ravi
- Produced by: Radha Ravi
- Starring: Radha Ravi
- Cinematography: Rajarajan
- Edited by: L. Kesavan
- Music by: Deva
- Production company: Akhshaya Creators
- Release date: 7 October 1994
- Running time: 150 minutes
- Country: India
- Language: Tamil

Ilaignar Ani (pronounced [iɭaːɲaɾ aɳi] transl. Team of Youngsters) is a 1994 Indian Tamil-language action drama film directed by K. R. Selvaraj. It stars Radha Ravi with newcomers R. Harish, Ranjeev, Harikumar, Kannan, Prem Raj, Vijayraj and Sivasanth playing supporting roles. The film was released on 7 October 1994.

== Plot ==
The film begins with the capture of the terrorist Kumar (Vasu Vikram) by ACP Rajarajan (Radha Ravi). Rajarajan investigates on Kumar's possible links, so he meets his roommates Raja (R. Harish), Balu (Ranjeev), Murali (Harikumar), Devaraj (Kannan), Shankar (Prem Raj), Peter (Vijayraj) and Siva (Sivasanth). Soon, the youngsters clash with the terrorist Kumar who used them wrongly and the local liquor-shop owner (Raviraj).

== Cast ==
- Radha Ravi as ACP Rajarajan
- R. Harish as Raja
- Ranjeev as Balu
- Harikumar as Murali
- Supergood Kannan as Devaraj
- Prem Raj as Shankar
- Vijayraj as Peter
- Sivasanth as Siva
- Chandrasekhar as Tamizhmani
- S. S. Chandran as Kaliappan
- Vadivelu
- Sonia as Janani
- Padmashri as Devi
- Vasu Vikram as Kumar
- Raviraj
- Gandhimathi as Kothamalli
- Disco Shanti as Rukku
- K. S. Jayalakshmi as Pudina
- Anuja
- Srilekha
- Shanthi Ganesh
- T.K.S. Chandran
- Peeli Sivam
- R. Veeramani
- Navarasam G.K.S.
- Joker Thulasi
- Marthandan
- Karthik in a guest appearance

== Soundtrack ==
The music was composed by Deva.

Song	Singer(s)	Lyrics	Duration
"Ammaavasai Rathiri"	Malgudi Subha	Piraisoodan	5:01
"Chinna Chinna"	S. P. Balasubrahmanyam, K. S. Chithra	Piraisoodan	4:59
"Kanni Poove Vaa"	K. S. Chithra, S. P. Balasubrahmanyam	Muthulingam	4:24
"Rukku Rukku"	Mano, Krishnaraj	Piraisoodan	4:58
"Unathilai Naina"	Deva	Piraisoodan	5:03

== Reception ==
Malini Mannath of The Indian Express gave the film a mixed review and said, "A tighter hold on his screenplay, avoiding of repetition of situations and stronger characterisations would have brought out the message better". Thulasi of Kalki praised the director for handling the theme against violence in an interesting manner.
