= Seenugadu Chiranjeevi Fan =

- DVD cover
- Directed by: Poosala Radha Krishna
- Written by: Poosala Radha Krishna; Poosala Venkateswara Rao (dialogues)
- Produced by: Akula Sriramulu
- Starring: Aakula Vijay Vardhan; Adin Khan; Mansi Pritam
- Cinematography: K Rajendra Prasad
- Edited by: Nandamuri Hari
- Music by: Siva Kakani
- Production company: ASR Creations
- Release date: 23 November 2005
- Country: India
- Language: Telugu

Seenugadu Chiranjeevi Fan (transl. the Seenu is the fan of Chiranjeevi)is a 2005 Indian Telugu romantic drama film directed by Poosala Radha Krishna and starring Akula Vijay and Adin Khan.

== Plot ==
Seenu (Akula Vijay Vardhan) is a responsible youngster and an ardent fan of Chiranjeevi. When a car drives fast ahead of his cousin Swati (Mansi Pritam), Seenu tracks the car driver Anjali (Adin Khan) and makes her apologize. Due to this delay, Anjali misses writing the finals of civil services exams. She forcibly starts saying in the family of seenu as he ruined her education. Anjali falls in love with seenu and she loses her eyesight due to the colors he threw on her eyes during holi festival. Seenu consults Chiranjeevi Charitable Trust and gets a personal assurance letter from Chiranjeevi. When seenu wants to tell this good news, Anjali is found practicing shooting in a local mela. When Seenu confronts Anjali why she lied to him, she tells him that she wants to take revenge on him for being the cause of the death of her guardian and her fiancée Kumar (Ravi Prakash). Later on Kumar returns to Anjali saying that he is still alive. Seenu also realizes that Kumar is a cheater and he is marrying Anjali just for the sake of money. The rest of the story is all about how Seenu exposes Kumar.

== Cast ==
- Akula Vijay Vardhan as Seenu
- Adin Khan as Anjali
- Mansi Pritam as Swati
- Kota Srinivasa Rao as Seenu's grandfather
- Sivaji Raja as Seenu's brother
- Surekha Vani as Seenu's sister-in-law
- Ravi Prakash as Kumar
- Venu Madhav
- M. S. Narayana
- L. B. Sriram
- Narsing Yadav
- Kondavalsa
- Jyothi
- Abhinayashree (special appearance in the song "Utti Kottandam")
- Nagendra Babu as himself (special appearance)

== Soundtrack ==
No.	Title	Singer(s)	Length
1.	"Utti Kottadam"	Jessie Gift, Malgudi Subha
2.	"Padakondo Yeta"	Malathi, Ravi Varma
3.	"Annayya Annayya"	Shankar Mahadevan, Sri Devi Bharani
4.	"Sage Neeli Megam"	K. S. Chitra, P. Unnikrishnan
5.	"Ninnemo Paparo"	Shankar Mahadevan, Malathi
6.	"Yamma Yamma"	Ravi Varma, Chaitra
