= Ponmudipuzhayorathu =

- DVD cover
- Directed by: Johnson Esthappan
- Written by: Johnson Esthappan
- Produced by: James Thattil
- Starring: Kalabhavan Mani; Meenakshi; Sheela; Nedumudi Venu
- Cinematography: Alagappan N.
- Edited by: K.Rajagopal
- Music by: Ilaiyaraaja
- Release date: 10 March 2005
- Running time: 125 minutes
- Country: India
- Language: Malayalam

Ponmudipuzhayorathu is a 2005 Indian Malayalam-language film directed by Johnson Esthappan, starring Sheela, Nedumudi Venu, Kalabhavan Mani, Madhu Warrier, Mala Aravindan and Indrans.

== Plot ==
The story unfolds in a quaint village steeped in mythical folklore. Chandran, a young man of the village, finds himself deeply in love with Valsala, Kumaran's sister. However, Kumaran's life takes a tragic turn when he becomes entangled in a web of unfortunate circumstances. Struggling to secure employment and facing financial hardships, Kumaran is lured into the clutches of an organized crime syndicate. In a desperate attempt to make ends meet, he becomes inadvertently involved in a murder. As the consequences of his actions weigh heavily upon him, Kumaran eventually sees his mistakes and decides to return to his village. But the repercussions of his involvement in crime have already begun to unravel the fabric of his family. His mother, Subhadra, succumbs to the stress and trauma, suffering from deteriorating mental health while sickness plagues the household. The shadows of Kumaran's past return to haunt him as the goons from the crime syndicate seek revenge for his departure. However, ironically, they find themselves ensnared in their web of deceit and violence, ultimately becoming victims of their vices.

== Cast ==
- Kalabhavan Mani as Policeman
- Meenakshi as Valsala
- Sheela as Subhadra
- Nedumudi Venu as Muthappan
- Madhu Warrier as Kumaran
- Aravind Akash as Chandran
- Suja Karthika as Radhika
- Mala Aravindan as Thankappan
- Vishnu as Rasheed
- Bindu Panikkar as Bharathi
- Indrans as Supran

== Soundtrack ==
The film's music is composed by Ilaiyaraaja.

1. "Maankutti Mainakkutti" - Manjari, Ilayaraaja, Asha Menon, Vidhu Prathap
2. "Naadaswaram ketto" - Asha Menon, Bhavatharini
3. "Oru Chiri Kandaal" - Manjari, Vijay Yesudas
4. "Ammayenna vaakku" - Ranjini Jose
5. "Vazhimaaroo vazhimaaroo" - Manjari, Asha Menon, Vidhu Prathap, Vijay Yesudas
6. "Pandathe Naattinpuram " - Ilaiyaraaja
7. "Ammayenna Vaakku (Male)" - K. J. Yesudas

== Future ==
Esthappan was to collaborate with Ilayaraja and Kalabhavan Mani again in Daffedar.
