= Honeymoon Express (2006 film) =

- Directed by: Nagendra Magadi Pandu
- Produced by: S. V. Babu
- Starring: Jaggesh; S. Narayan; Santhoshi; Deepu
- Music by: R. P. Patnaik
- Release date: 16 June 2006
- Country: India
- Language: Kannada

Honeymoon Express is a 2006 Indian Kannada-language comedy film directed by Nagendra Magadi Pandu and starring Jaggesh, S. Narayan, Santhoshi and Deepu. The film's script was reportedly inspired by a Marathi story.

== Cast ==
- Jaggesh as Jaggi
- S. Narayan as Nani
- Santhoshi as Soumya
- Deepu as Ramya
- Komal
- Srinath
- Sharan
- Karibasavaiah
- Sihi Kahi Chandru
- Saurav
- Manjunath

== Production ==
The film was shot at the Ramoji Film City and Bangalore. A song was shot on National Highway 44. A scene with Rangayana Raghu was shot at the Bangalore Heart Hospital.

== Release and reception ==
The film released on 16 June 2006.

R. G. Vijayasarathy of IANS wrote that "Honeymoon Express ends up as a disappointing product mainly because of a poor script, despite the presence of some top talented artists in the Kannada film industry". A critic from Rediff.com gave the film a rating of one-and-a-half out of five stars and said that "Honeymoon Express is a wasted effort because of a weak script and haphazard narration". A critic from Filmibeat said that "this [film] is engaging in the first half and intricacy in the second half makes the proceedings very interesting. The misconception is the concept of the second half sends the audience in peels of laughter". A critic from Indiaglitz rated the film 8 out of 10 and said that "Jaggesh and Narayan are at ease" and called them the "perfect duo". Deccan Herald wrote "The comedy scenes, most of them slapstick, have been used in many films earlier. The film could have been much better if the director had concentrated on the script".

== Box office ==
The film had a good opening with several days of houseful shows in Belgaum and Mysore. The film also ran well in Bangalore. Despite starting of well, collections started to decline. After the success of this film, the director went on to make another comedy film titled Tenali Rama (2006) with several of the same cast and crew members.
