= Thirunelveli (film) =

2000 Indian Tamil-language film

- Theatrical release poster
- Directed by: Bharathi Kannan
- Produced by: R. B. Choudary
- Starring: Prabhu; Roja; Karan
- Cinematography: Rajarajan
- Edited by: V. Jaishankar
- Music by: Ilaiyaraaja
- Production company: Super Good Films
- Release date: 15 January 2000
- Country: India
- Language: Tamil

Thirunelveli (transl. Sacred Paddy Hedge) is a 2000 Indian Tamil-language drama film, directed by Bharathi Kannan. The film stars Prabhu and Roja while Karan, Udhaya and Sithara among others form an ensemble cast. Music for the film was composed by Ilaiyaraaja and the film was released on 15 January 2000.

== Plot ==
Thulasi (Prabhu) is a rich landlord in Tirunelveli who lives with his brother Varadappan (Karan) and mother (Manorama). Varadappan has a wife (Sithara), a son (Sakthi Kumar), and a daughter, Rani (Vindhya). Thulasi is well-respected in his hometown, and he never lies under any circumstances. In a small flashback, Thulasi was in love with Kattazhagi, but she later died. Enmity prevails between Thulasi and Soonaswamy (S. S. Chandran). Satha is appointed as Varadappan's car driver, and love blossoms between him and Rani. Thulasi realises this but does not disclose it to Varadappan, as he would try to separate the couple. Soonaswamy joins hands with Velu Nayakkar (Ponnambalam), a local thug, and tries to separate Thulasi and Varadappan, which he succeeds in doing. Thulasi leaves home with his mother. Now, Varadappan finds out about Rani's love affair and decides to kill her and Satha. The couple runs to Thulasi for life. Thulasi hides them in his home. When Varadappan inquires about the couple to Thulasi, he lies that he is unaware of their whereabouts. Varadappan leaves the place, believing that Thulasi will never lie. The couple thanks Thulasi for saving their lives, but are shocked to see him dead. Varadappan then realises his mistake and apologises. The couple is united.

== Cast ==
- Prabhu as Thulasi Nayakkar
- Karan as Varadappan Nayakkar
- Roja as Kattazhagi
- Vindhya as Rani
- Manorama as Thulasi's mother
- Sithara as Varadappan's wife
- Udhaya as Satha
- S. S. Chandran as Soonaswamy Naidu
- Vivek as Soonaswamy's son
- Ponnambalam as Velu
- Sakthi Kumar as Varadappan's son
- Jeevan
- Alex as Aranmanai
- Nellai Siva as Manickam
- Bonda Mani
- Ramya Krishnan as Azhagamma in "Yele Azhagamma"

Uncredited

- King Kong
- Thalapathy Dinesh
- Raghava Lawrence as dancer in "Yele Azhagamma"

== Soundtrack ==
Soundtrack was composed by Ilaiyaraaja.

Song	Singers	Lyrics	Length
"Ini Naalum Thirunaal"	Arunmozhi, Swarnalatha, Ilaiyaraaja, S. N. Surendar, Manorama	Muthulingam	04:49
"Ola Kudisayile"	Biju Narayanan	Chidambaranathan	05:04
"Kattazhagi"	Devie Neithiyar	Mayil	05:29
"Thirunelveli"	Mano, Ilaiyaraaja	Pulamaipithan	05:51
"Yele Azhagamma"	Arunmozhi, K. S. Chithra	Bharathi Kannan	05:23
"Endha Paavi"	Sunandha	Su. Ashok	01:38
"Saathi Enum"	Ilaiyaraaja	Poovai Senguttuvan	02:09

== Reception ==
Malini Mannath wrote for Chennai Online, "The director, like the audience, seems to have had enough of filial bonding, and takes recourse to the caste factor to pep up his narration [...] Vivek's comedy track is weird, but provides some welcome relief". Tamil Star wrote, "It is Prabhu's sensitive portrayal and a more gripping narrative after the interval that have saved the film from slipping into mediocrity [...] Fight scenes are well executed . But Ilayaraja's music is disappointing".
