= Thangam =

- DVD cover
- Directed by: G. Kicha
- Produced by: Shahul Hameed; G. Kicha
- Starring: Sathyaraj; Goundamani; Jayashree; Meghna Nair
- Music by: Srikanth Deva
- Production company: Shree Movie Makers
- Release date: 1 February 2008
- Country: India
- Language: Tamil

Thangam (transl. Gold) is a 2008 Indian Tamil-language action drama film directed by Kicha, starring Sathyaraj as a village do-gooder.

== Plot ==
Set in a small town near Coimbatore, 'Thangam' portrays tw families headed by Rajendranath and Mahadevan respectively. Thangam (Sathyaraj) is the son of Delhi Kumar and Aaruchami (Shanmugaraj) is the son of Mahadevan. Kaalai (Goundamani) is the uncle of Thangam.

Thangam and his sister Bhagyalakshmi (Jayashree) share a special attachment. The sister finds a suitable girl (Megha Nair) for the brother, who tries hard to arrange her marriage in a grand manner.

The two families turn foes because of the local MLA, who is corrupt. The MLA wants to get rid of Rajendranath, who commands respect in the constituency. He gets close to Aaruchami, who is jealous of the respect commanded by Thangam and his family.

The story has many twists and turns. Aaruchami, a compulsive womanizer, woo Thangam's sister and makes her pregnant. Thangam, who is mad of his sister, makes Aaruchami marry him. Aaruchami commits a murder but Thangam accepts the responsibility and go to the jail to save Aaruchami, to make the marriage of his sister possible.

Later, the relationship between the families is affected further with Mahadevan revolts against Rajendranath to make his son Aaruchami as MLA. In the process, he commits a murder and gets punished.

The battle gets worsened. Rajendranath and Bhagyalakshmi are killed. The rest of the story narrates how Thangam avenges for the murders.

== Cast ==
- Sathyaraj as Thangam
- Meghna Nair
- Goundamani as Kaalai
- Jayashree as Bhagyalakshmi
- Mahadevan
- Delhi Kumar
- Shanmugaraj as Aaruchami
- Chelladurai as Villager
- Siva Narayana Murthy as Bullock cart driver
- Thalapathy Dinesh as Director
- Kottachi as Soothsayer

== Soundtrack ==
Soundtrack was composed by Srikanth Deva, with lyrics written by Yugabharathi.

- "Othakathu" - Karthik, Saindhavi
- "Rathathula" - Manikka Vinayagam
- "Pattukara" - Chinmayi
- "Chinna Chinna" - Senthildas, Surmukhi Raman
- "Solran" - Priyadarshini

== Reception ==
Sify wrote "The story is as old as the hills, presentation in mass masala format that works in B & C centers. Kicha makes no bones about it that he is playing to the galleries and uses the tested formula that was a winning factor in the 80's - Annan-Thankachi Pasum (brother-sister sentiments), comedy and action". Anamika of Kalki wrote that although the story has an old flavor, Kicha has tried to mix comedy and action however the big minus is that the script moves in slow motion after the interval.
