= Theenda Theenda =

- Directed by: A. B. Mughan
- Written by: A. B. Mughan
- Produced by: A. S. Maryson
- Starring: Shivhasan; Vinod; Preethi Varma; Shravya Sudhakar
- Cinematography: Sri Ganesh
- Edited by: B. K. Keerthy
- Music by: Shankar–Ganesh
- Production company: Maryson Films
- Release date: 7 April 2006
- Running time: 110 minutes
- Country: India
- Language: Tamil

Theenda Theenda is a 2006 Indian Tamil language drama film directed by A. B. Mughan. The film stars newcomer Shivhasan, Vinod, Preethi Varma and newcomer Shravya Sudhakar, with Vijayan, Rajesh, Vadivukkarasi, Sethu Vinayagam, Kumarimuthu, Priyanka, Gemini Rajeshwari, and Gowthami Vembunathan playing supporting roles. The film, produced by A. S. Maryson, was released on 7 April 2006.

== Plot ==
Azhagesan (Shivhasan) is a jobless youngster and chain smoker who spends his time roaming with his friends in the village. His mother Ponnatha (Vadivukkarasi) loves him more than anything and spoils him, while his father Paramasivam (Rajesh) hates him for being a wastrel. Azhagesan and Deivanai (Shravya), the daughter of the village bigwig Ramasamy (Sethu Vinayagam), fall in love with each other. Their love affair crosses through mild hassles, like when Deivanai's cousin Vinod (Vinod), an army man on a trip to his village, seeks her hand in marriage. Vinod realises that she is in love with him, so Anand genuinely accepts their love and leaves the village. Meanwhile, Azhagesan's cousin Valli (Preethi Varma) arrives at his village and starts to woo him. Meanwhile, the villagers decide to not consume alcohol until the end of the village festival. The last day of the festival, the angry arrack traders create a ruckus in the village. The huts of the villagers catch fire, and many villagers have died, including Deivanai.

The incident disturbs the peace of the place causing friction between two communities. The fire was, in fact, caused by Azhagesan who had inadvertently tossed out his cigarette butt in a haystack that day. When the villagers come to know about it, they beat him up. A remorseful Azhagesan begs them to kill him for his carelessness, but they let him go. The film ends with a saddened Azhagesan leaving the village.

== Cast ==
- Shivhasan as Azhagesan
- Vinod as Vinod
- Preethi Varma as Valli
- Shravya Sudhakar as Deivanai
- Vijayan as Village President
- Rajesh as Paramasivam
- Vadivukkarasi as Ponnatha
- Sethu Vinayagam as Ramasamy
- Kumarimuthu as Villager
- Gowthami Vembunathan as Deivanai's mother
- Gemini Rajeshwari as Deivanai's grandmother
- Priyanka as Marikozhundhu
- Scissor Manohar as Thar Road
- Crane Manohar as Puli Moottai
- Vellai Subbaiah as Villager
- Munnar Ramesh
- Master Udayaraj as Vandu
- M. P. Paul as Bell
- Raani
- Frank Kothas
- Muniraj
- Kalai
- Udumalai Royal Karthik
- Vandar Kuzhazhi Smitha in a special appearance
- Risha in a special appearance

== Soundtrack ==
Theenda Theenda

Soundtrack album by Shankar–Ganesh
- Released: 2006
- Recorded: 2006
- Genre: Feature film soundtrack
- Length: 24:51
- Producer: Shankar–Ganesh

The film score and the soundtrack were composed by Shankar–Ganesh. The soundtrack, released in 2006, features 6 tracks written by Thamizhnathan, Gopal Daasan and A. B. Mughan.

Tracklist
No.	Title	Singer(s)	Length
1.	"Vaanam Karukka"	Pushpavanam Kuppusamy	5:29
2.	"Vechikkava Vechikkava"	Shankar–Ganesh	3:51
3.	"Raa Pagala Kanvizhithu"	Sankar Ganesh	2:04
4.	"Pudhu Malare"	Tippu, Sridevi	4:17
5.	"Enna Solli"	Gangai Amaran	4:46
6.	"Theenda Theenda"	Pushpavanam Kuppusamy, Malathy Lakshman	4:24
Total length:			24:51

== Reception ==
Malini Mannath of Chennai Online said, "It's a film with a relevant message no doubt, fairly well communicated, but with a lot more room for improvement in the crafting of it".
