= Utharavu Maharaja =

- Directed by: Asif Kuraishi
- Written by: Asif Kuraishi
- Produced by: Udhaya
- Starring: Udhaya; Priyanka Thimmesh; Prabhu
- Cinematography: Balajee Rangha
- Edited by: R. Sathyanarayanan
- Music by: Naren Balakumar
- Production company: Jaeshan Studios
- Release date: 16 November 2018
- Country: India
- Language: Tamil

Utharavu Maharaja (transl. Yes, Your Majesty) is a 2018 Tamil language film directed by Asif Kuraishi. The film stars Udhaya, who also produced the film, Priyanka Thimmesh, and Prabhu in the lead roles, while Nassar, Kovai Sarala, Sriman, and M. S. Bhaskar play supporting roles. The music was composed by Naren Balakumar with cinematography by Balajee Rangha and editing by R. Sathyanarayanan. The film released on 16 November 2018.

== Cast ==
- Udhaya as Ravi
- Priyanka Thimmesh as Saadhana
- Prabhu as Arun Bose
- Nassar as M. Alagappan
- Sriman as Inspector Ekambavanan
- Kovai Sarala as Inspector Thirupurasundari
- M. S. Bhaskar
- Manobala
- Sachu
- Kutty Padmini
- G. Dhananjayan
- Thalapathy Dinesh
- Mippu
- VJ Adams

== Soundtrack ==
The soundtrack was composed by Naren Balakumar. Karthi, Vivek, Kovai Sarala, Arun Vijay, Sangeetha, Prem, Pasupathy, and Sachu attended the audio launch.

Utharavu Maharaja

Soundtrack album by Naren Balakumar
- Released: 2018
- Genre: Feature film soundtrack
- Length: 17:11
- Language: Tamil
- Label: TrendMusic
- Producer: Naren Balakumar

Naren Balakumar chronology
Thappu Thanda (2017)	Utharavu Maharaja (2018)	Echo (2023)

Track listing
No.	Title	Lyrics	Singer(s)	Length
1.	"Yaar Da Yaar Da"		Diwakar, Asif Kuraishi, Naren Balakumar	3:52
2.	"Nyayam Dharmam"	Na. Muthukumar	Deepak Blue, Asif Kuraishi, Puli, MC Ganee	4:24
3.	"Enna Mayam"	Asif Kuraishi	Nivas, Padmaja Srinivasan	4:22
4.	"Enna Mayam (Reprise Version)"		Nivas, Padmaja Srinivasan	2:01
5.	"Theme of Betrayal (Theme Music)"		Naren Balakumar	2:32
Total length:				17:11

== Release ==
The Times of India gave the film two out of five stars saying that "Utharavu Maharaja lacks the filmmaking panache that such a premise needs". On the contrary, News Today Net stated that "With a little more effort from the cast and scriptwriter, Utharavu Maharaja could have been even better. Nevertheless, the movie that starts off in a complicated structure, sets itself on track to end with its ideology conveyed well.". Cinema Express wrote "Utharavu Maharaja turns out to be a huge disappointment thanks to the hyperbolic performances, unrealistic staging and poorly-written dialogues".

== Home media ==
The satellite rights of the film were acquired by Colors Tamil.
