= Junior Senior (2005 film) =

- Directed by: G. Sreekantan
- Screenplay by: Rajan Kiriyath
- Story by: Dr. Santhosh Thomas
- Produced by: Saji; Najeem; Reji
- Starring: Kunchacko Boban; Mukesh
- Cinematography: Anil Gopinath
- Edited by: P C Mohanan
- Music by: M. Jayachandran
- Distributed by: Rajasri release, Surya release
- Release date: 11 March 2005
- Country: India
- Language: Malayalam
- Budget: ₹85 lakh

Junior Senior is a 2005 Indian Malayalam-language comedy film directed by G. Sreekantan (in his directorial debut). starring Kunchacko Boban and Mukesh. The film is based on Yes Boss (1997).

== Plot ==
The movie was based on the life of a youngster Kichu, who is an ambitious young man who desires to become rich. He works for a wealthy man Manu who tries to cheat girls by making them fall into his trap. Manu tries to flatter Akhila who is also an ambitious young woman and an aspiring model and Kichu loves.

== Cast ==
- Kunchacko Boban as Krishnakumar aka Kichu
- Mukesh as Manu, Kichu's employer
- Meenakshi as Akhila
- Renjini Krishnan as Renju, Manu's wife
- Harisree Ashokan as Jeeva, Kichu's friend and Manu's employee
- C. I. Paul as Hariharan, Renju's father
- Jagadish as Balagangadharan, Renju's cousin
- Jose Pellissery as Varmaji, Manu's manager
- Salim Kumar as Sathyan
- Vinayakan as Shivan
- Narayanankutty as Sundaran
- Sruthi Nair (Devika Rani)

== Production ==
Kunchacko Boban did not like the director's initial story and the director changed it to partially match the Hindi film Yes Boss (1997). The film was shot in an Ernakulam hotel and for four to five days in Pondicherry.

== Soundtrack ==
The music is composed by M. Jayachandran.

- "Aasha Aasha" - Afsal, Vidhu Prathap
- "Enikkinnu Venam" - M. Jayachandran, Sujatha
- "Enthe Enthe" - M. G. Sreekumar
- "Naattumaavin" - M. G. Sreekumar, Jyotsna
