= Ringtone (film) =

- Directed by: Ajmal
- Produced by: Prabhukumar,Sreekumar K D
- Starring: Suresh Gopi; Bala; Meghna Nair
- Music by: Ishaan Dev
- Release date: 4 June 2010
- Country: India
- Language: Malayalam

Ringtone is a 2010 Indian Malayalam-language film directed by Ajmal, starring Suresh Gopi, Bala and debutant Meghna Nair. This was the last movie of the actor Rajan P. Dev.

== Plot ==
Krishna is running from the police for attacking them in public in an attempt to save his mother who was lathi charged. He is travelling in a truck and meets Meera. The truck meets with an accident and they stay as a guest of the truck owner. Ninan Koshy IPS, an officer from the Central Anti - Terrorist Squad is asked to investigate this case, which has some important links to an upcoming maoist insurgency .

== Cast ==
- Suresh Gopi as SP Ninan Koshy IPS, Central ATS officer
- Bala as Krishna
- Meghna Nair as Meera Bhat
- Rajan P. Dev as Rajasingam Thampuran
- Hareesh Peradi as Naxal Das
- Sai Kumar as Krishna Bhat, maoist leader
- Baburaj as CI James Chacko
- Tini Tom as ATS officer Iqbal Mohammad
- Abu Salim as Gopi, Lorry Driver
- Kiran Raj as Military Commando, ATS officer Samy Antony
- Biju Kuttan as Sarasan
- Anoop Chandran as Babu
- Machan Varghese as Joseph
- Manuraj as Dineshan
- Zeenath as Krishna's mother
- Kalaranjini as Rajasingam's wife
- KPAC Saji as DIG Jayasimhan IPS, Commissioner of Police

== Reception ==
A critic from Rediff.com rated the film one out of five stars and wrote that "All in all, It is better to keep the phone in silent mode than hear this irritating Ring Tone." A critic from Indiaglitz wrote that "All in all, this Ringtone is quite irritating affair, which forces you to change for any other instantly."
