= Theal (film) =

2022 film directed by Harikumar

- Theatrical release poster
- Directed by: Harikumar
- Written by: Harikumar
- Based on: Pietà by Kim Ki-duk
- Produced by: K. E. Gnanavel Raja
- Starring: Prabhu Deva; Samyuktha Hegde
- Cinematography: Vignesh Vasu
- Edited by: Praveen K. L.
- Music by: C. Sathya
- Production company: Studio Green
- Distributed by: Sakthi Film Factory; Magic Rays
- Release date: 14 January 2022
- Country: India
- Language: Tamil

Theal (pronounced [teːɭ]; transl. Scorpion) is a 2022 Indian Tamil-language action film, an adaptation of the 2012 South Korean film Pietà, written and directed by Harikumar in his directorial debut and produced by K. E. Gnanavel Raja of Studio Green. The film stars Prabhu Deva and Samyuktha Hegde, with Easwari Rao, Yogi Babu, Shatru and Arjai in supporting roles. The film's music and score is composed by C. Sathya, with cinematography handled by Vignesh Vasu and editing done by Praveen K. L.

The film was released in theatres on 14 January 2022 to mixed to positive reviews from critics.

== Synopsis ==
Durai works as a ruthless, cold-hearted henchman to one such loan shark named Paulraj. All is fine for Durai until a woman barges into his house and claims that she is his mother. This sends Durai's reality into a spiral, and what happened next makes the rest of the story.

== Cast ==
- Prabhu Deva as Durai
- Samyuktha Hegde as Thilaka, Durai's love interest
- Easwari Rao as Durai's adopted mother and Raja's mother
- Yogi Babu as Tiger, Thilaka's friend
- Shatru as Paulraj
- Vishnu Unnikrishnan as Raja
- Bharani as Vel
- G. Marimuthu as Raja's father
- Imman Annachi as Manickam Annachi
- Arjai
- Kabali Vishwanth
- Cool Suresh
- Supergood Subramani as Picture Shop Owner
- Karthik Ashokan
- Janaki
- Mahana
- Madhavi
- Subhathini
- Shanthi Mani
- Vijay Muthu
- Rudhru
- Puli Pandi
- Winner Ramachandran
- Coco Anand

== Music ==
The film's soundtrack is composed by C. Sathya in his first collaboration with Prabhu Deva and Harikumar. The soundtrack album featured four songs written by Viveka, Uma Devi, Lavarthan, and Kiruthiyaa.

Theal

Soundtrack album by C. Sathya
- Released: 2022
- Genre: Feature film soundtrack
- Length: 14:28
- Language: Tamil
- Label: Think Music
- Producer: C. Sathya

C. Sathya chronology
Aranmanai 3 (2021)	Theal (2022)	Raangi (2022)

Track listing
No.	Title	Lyrics	Singer(s)	Length
1.	"Enna Petha Devadhaiye"	Uma Devi	C. Sathya	4:15
2.	"Vaatura Theetura"	Lavarthan	V. M. Mahalingam, Meenakshi Elayaraja	3:58
3.	"Madhavi Ponmayilaaga"	Viveka	Priya Himesh	3:23
4.	"Thealu Thealu"	Kiruthiyaa	Harikumar Atul, Hyde Karty, Raghav Jock	2:52

== Release ==
=== Theatrical ===
The film was initially planned for release in theatres on 10 December 2021, but got postponed due to unforeseen situations. It was later scheduled for 14 January 2022, Pongal festival.

=== Home media ===
The satellite rights of the film were bagged by Star Network television rights of the film were sold to Star Vijay and digital streaming rights were acquired by Disney+ Hotstar respectively.

== Reception ==
M. Suganth of The Times of India said, "Theal is a surprisingly effective drama that is well-made with performances that hold our attention. Yes, much of the film's emotional impact comes from the writing, [...] but the filmmaking is also solid enough".Maalai Malar critic noted that "Director Harikumar has directed the film focusing on mother and son affection. The film did not attract many fans as it was thought that only affection was enough."Dinamalar critic gave a mixed review and said that "They thought that only mother sentiment will save the film. That's not enough, it's true" and gave 2.5 out of 5 stars.
