= Narakasuran =

- Directed by: K. R. Ramdas
- Written by: K. R. Ramdas
- Produced by: Ajmal Hasan
- Starring: Sudhakar Vasanth; Indraja; Riyaz Khan; Devan; Madhupal; Kalabhavan Mani; Jagadish
- Production company: Gaayathri Films International
- Release date: 2006
- Country: India
- Language: Malayalam

Narakasuran is a 2006 Malayalam language film directed by K. R. Ramdas. It stars Sudhakar Vasanth, Riyaz Khan, Kalabhavan Mani, Jagathy Sreekumar, Indraja, Rajan P. Dev, Devan, Salim Kumar, Jagadish and Priyanka Anoop.

== Cast ==
- Sudhakar Vasanth as Vijay/Prabhakaran alias Prabhu
- Jagadish as Vasu
- Indrans as Bheeman
- Kalabhavan Mani as Dr. Pramod, Vijay's friend
- Riyaz Khan as SP Rajan, Vijay's friend
- Madhupal as Adv. Bhaskar, Vijay's friend and legal advisor
- Devan as Badri
- Mafia Sasi as Badri's henchman
- Priyanka Anoop as Dr. Amritha Pramod, Pramod's wife
- Salim Kumar as CBI Officer Govind
- Rajan P. Dev as CBI Officer Subhash Chandra
- Indraja as Neena Viswanath, Vijay's fiancée
- Jagathy Sreekumar as Bhojarajan, Neena's watchman/cook
- K. R. Vatsala as Vimala Bhojarajan, Neena's PA and Bhojarajan's wife
