= Sudhakar Vasanth =

- Other name: Sudhakar Basanta
- Occupations: Director, choreographer, actor
- Years active: 1992–present
- Father: Vasanth Kumar

Sudhakar Vasanth, also known as Sudhakar Basant, is an Indian film director, choreographer and actor known for his works in Odia cinema.

== Career ==
Sudhakar Vasanth assisted his father Vasanth Kumar as a choreographer and worked alongside Prabhu Deva, Chinni Prakash, and B H Tarun Kumar. He made his debut as one of the lead actors in the Tamil film Innisai Mazhai (1992). His tryst with Odia cinema started when Gopal Jogesh, the director of Sola Shukrabaar (1999), asked him to choreograph one of the songs while the film shoot was occurring in Chennai. After music director Prasant Padhi suggested he get into filmmaking, he made his directorial debut with Mitare Mita (2009). He has since worked as a choreographer for 1,200 songs.

== Filmography ==
=== As film director ===
Year	Title	Director	Choreographer	Ref.
2009	Mitare Mita	Yes		
2010	Prema Adhei Akhyara	Yes		
2011	Kiese Dakuchi Kouthi Mate	Yes	Yes	
2011	Balunga Toka	Yes	Yes	
2012	Something Something	Yes	Yes	
2012	Matric Fail	Yes		
2012	ACP Ranveer	Yes	Yes	
2013	Mo Duniya Tu Hi Tu	Yes		
2013	Daha Balunga	Yes	Yes	
2014	Omm	Yes		
2014	Something Something 2	Yes		
2014	Ganja Ladhai	Yes		
2015	Aashiq	Yes	Yes	

=== As choreographer ===
Year	Title	Ref.
1995	Mo Mana Khali Tumari Pain	
1999	Sola Shukrabaar	
1999	Prem Bandhan	
2001	Baazi	
2005	Tate Mo Rana	
2005	Babu I Love You	
2006	Tu Eka Aama Saha Bharasa	
2007	Chaka Chaka Bhaunri	
2007	Mu Tate Love Karuchi	
2007	Pheria Mo Suna Bhauni	
2008	Kalinga Putra	
2008	Mate Ta Love Helare	
2008	Satya Meba Jayate	
2008	Nandini I Love U	
2009	Prem Rogi	
2010	Mu Kana Ete Kharap	
2010	Aalo Mora Kandhei	
2010	Sanju Aau Sanjana	
2010	Swayamsiddha	
2011	Loafer	
2011	Most Wanted	
2011	Tu Mo Girlfriend	
2011	Family No.1	
2011	Kemiti A Bandhana	
2011	Aain Kanoon	
2012	Shapath	
2012	Tu Mo Arambha Tu Mo Sesha	
2012	Idiot: I Do Ishq Only Tumse	
2012	Rangila Toka	
2012	Chanda Na Tame Tara	
2013	Tu Mo Suna Tu Mo Hira	
2013	Hata Dhari Chalutha	
2013	Kehi Jane Bhala Lagere	
2015	Maya	
2015	Mo Dil Kahe Ilu Ilu	
2016	Love Station	

=== As an actor ===
Year	Title	Role	Language	Notes	Ref.
1992	Innisai Mazhai	Saravanan	Tamil		
2000	Ingane Oru Nilapakshi		Malayalam		
2000	Rapid Action Force		Malayalam		
2003	Achante Kochumol		Malayalam	Guest appearance in the song 'panachikada'	
2006	Thoothukudi		Tamil		
2006	Narakasuran	Vijay/Prabhakaran alias Prabhu	Malayalam	Also producer	
2007	Veeramum Eeramum	Semmarai Pandian	Tamil		
2008	Iyakkam	Aandavar	Tamil		
2011	Kiese Dakuchi Kouthi Mate		Odia	Guest appearance	
2011	Balunga Toka		Odia	Guest appearance	
2012	ACP Ranveer		Odia	Guest appearance	
2014	Omm		Odia	Guest appearance	
2014	Ganja Ladhai	Anna	Odia		
2015	Kie Daba Takkar	Bhalu Yadav	Odia		
2015	Aashiq	Bijay Singh	Odia		

== Awards ==
- 2010: 2nd Tarang Cine Awards – Best Choreography
- 2012: 3rd ETV Odia Film Awards – Best Director for Balunga Toka
