= Meenakshi (Malayalam actress) =

Indian Tamil actress

- Born: Maria Margaret Sharmilee; Coimbatore, Tamilnadu, India
- Other names: Sharmili, Sharmilee
- Education: Master of Computer Applications
- Alma mater: Stella Maris College, Chennai; Loyola College, Chennai
- Years active: 2002–2005

Meenakshi, also known as Sharmilee or Sharmili, is an Indian former actress, who worked in Malayalam, Tamil and Telugu films. The Kerala Film Critics Association named her their 2005 debutante artist. In all of her Tamil-language films, she was credited as Sharmilee. In Malayalam, she rechristened herself as Meenakshi, the character she played in Kakkakarumban (2004).

== Early life ==
Meenakshi was born as Maria Margaret Sharmilee in Coimbatore, Tamil Nadu, in a Catholic family. Her mother hails from Ooty. She is the only child of her parents. Her father worked in telecom department, and her mother was a housewife.

Meenakshi studied at CSI Bain School in Chennai and graduated from school in 1996. She was very popular in school and learned Bharathanatayam. She was a talented dancer. She then graduated in Mathematics from Stella Maris College, Chennai, and received a Master of Computer Applications (MCA) degree from Loyola College, Chennai.

While in school, Meenakshi received several acting offers, which she rejected so that she could concentrate on her studies. She did modeling and later hosted a popular phone-in program, Kasumele on Jaya TV. People were instantly attracted by her cheerful and youthful approach to anchoring. After graduation, she started her career in films.

== Career ==
Her debut Tamil movie was Aasai Aasaiyai in 2003 with Jiiva, who also made his debut with this film. This movie was not very well received in the box office even though the story and Sharmeelee's acting got good reviews from critics. This was then followed by Anbe Anbe with Shaam was classified as a medium hit in the box office. Her third Tamil movie was Diwan with Sarathkumar. This movie won her rave reviews for her performance. It was followed by her Telugu entry through the movie Taarak in 2003.

In 2004, she made her debut in Malayalam industry with two movies - Vellinakshatram and Kaakkakarumban. Her first movie Vellinakshatram was a mega hit and her performance was appreciated by many. After that she established herself in Malayalam movies with a string of hit movies. The same year, Youth Festival and Black (cameo appearance) were also released. Later however, she tried her luck in other regional languages.

In 2005, she appeared in the movie Junior Senior, where she acted aside Mukesh and Kunchacko Boban. This movie was a remake of Hindi classic hit, Yes Boss, where Meenakshi reprised the role played by Juhi Chawla. Same year, Ponmudipuzhayorathu was also released. Most of the songs she acted in were hits. "Oru Chiri Kandaal" was one of the top songs of Malayalam in the year 2005. So was "Kalla Kalla Kochu Kalla". The same year she retired from film industry for prioritize her family life.

== Personal life ==
She got married and settled down in Bangalore. In 2004, Meenakshi told an interviewer that "I love to act in more Malayalam films as the characters here have depth and the heroines have much more to do than just look good."

== Filmography ==
Year	Title	Role	Language	Notes
2003	Aasai Aasaiyai	Brindha	Tamil	
2003	Anbe Anbe	Vaishali	Tamil	
2003	Taarak	Varsha	Telugu	
2003	Diwan	Aishwarya	Tamil	
2004	Vellinakshathram	Indu/Indumathy Devi	Malayalam	
2004	Kakkakarumban	Meenakshi	Malayalam	
2004	Youth Festival	Athira	Malayalam	
2004	Black	Special appearance	Malayalam	
2005	Pesuvoma	Thenmozhi	Tamil	
2005	Junior Senior	Akhila	Malayalam	
2005	Ponmudipuzhayorathu	Valsala	Malayalam	
2005	Hridayangamam	Chandrika	Malayalam	
2005	Gafoor Ka Dost	Fathima	Malayalam	

== Other work ==
She has acted in some advertisements including Kumarikalpam Tonic, Plaza Jewellery, Pooja Milk, Vanamala Washing Powder etc. she acted in Devi Sri Prasad's music video for "Ey: Unnada" from the album Mr. Devi (1998). She hosted Kaasu Mele, live show.
