= Youth Festival =

- Poster
- Directed by: Jose Thomas
- Written by: V. C. Ashok
- Produced by: Visual Dreams Pvt.Ltd
- Starring: Aby Kunjumon; Sidharth Bharathan; Bhavana; Meenakshi
- Cinematography: Anil Nair
- Edited by: K Rajagopal
- Music by: M. Jayachandran; M. G. Anil
- Distributed by: Visual Dreams Pvt.Ltd
- Release date: 29 October 2004
- Country: India
- Language: Malayalam

Youth Festival is a 2004 Indian Malayalam romantic drama film directed by Jose Thomas, starring Aby Kunjumon, Sidharth Bharathan, Bhavana and Meenakshi.

== Cast ==
- Aby Kunjumon as Shivan
- Sidharth Bharathan as Arjun Achuthan
- Bhavana as Parvathy
- Meenakshi as Athira Kanakkurup
- 'Atlas' Ramachandran as Ramachandran
- Harisree Martin as Lonappan
- Cochin Haneefa as Kodaiyil Kannakurup
- Narayanankutty as Chellappan
- Niyas Backer as Shatrukhanan
- CI Paul as Kottapuraykal Achuthan
- Salim Kumar as Veerapandi
- Kishor Satya as Ranjan
- Ponnamma Babu
- Pala Aravindan

== Soundtrack ==
The film has songs composed by M. Jayachandran and M. G. Anil.

Track listing
No.	Title	Lyrics	Music	Singer(s)	Length
1.	"Kalla Kalla"	Shibu Chakravarthy	M. Jayachandran	Rajesh Vijay, Jyotsna Radhakrishnan	3:56
2.	"Valentine"	Kaithapram Damodaran Namboothiri	M. Jayachandran	Dr. Fahad Mohammad, Chitra Iyer	4:20
3.	"Roja Roja"	Kaithapram Damodaran Namboothiri	M. Jayachandran	G. Venugopal, Teenu Treasa	4:46
4.	"Priyamalle"	Kaithapram Damodaran Namboothiri	M. Jayachandran	Franco Simon, Jyotsna Radhakrishnan	4:41
5.	"Kalla Kalla" (Karaoke)	—	M. Jayachandran	—	3:55
6.	"Roja Roja" (Solo)	Kaithapram Damodaran Namboothiri	M. Jayachandran	G. Venugopal	4:46
7.	"Good Goodbye"	Kaithapram Damodaran Namboothiri	M. Jayachandran	Alex Kayyalakkal, Ranjini Jose	4:35
8.	"Poomoodum Vrindhavanam"	Chittoor Gopi	M. G. Anil	Teenu Treasa	4:34
9.	"Priyamalle" (Karaoke)	—	M. Jayachandran	—	4:39
Total length:					40:11

== Reception ==
In a scathing review, a critic writing forSify stated: "Youth Festival is another film with young stars that falls flat due to lack of a proper story idea and presentation. Director Jose Thomas and his script writer V. C. Ashok have borrowed from many recent Tamil films including a straight lift from the climax of Kathal Kondein".

== Legacy ==
After working in this film, Kishor Satya said that he "would accept any role he [Jose Thomas] gives, even if it is a passing shot".
