= Unnai Kann Theduthe =

- Directed by: Ratheesh Ramayya
- Written by: V. Geethakrishnan (dialogues)
- Screenplay by: Ratheesh Ramayya
- Story by: Vaidhyanathan
- Produced by: Vaidhyanathan
- Starring: Udhaya; Manya
- Cinematography: P. S. Dharan
- Edited by: D. Ezhumalai
- Music by: Sirpy
- Production company: Staar Makers International
- Release date: 3 July 2009
- Running time: 130 minutes
- Country: India
- Language: Tamil

Unnai Kann Theduthe (transl. My eye is searching for you) is a 2009 Tamil language drama film directed by Ratheesh Ramayya, who also wrote the screenplay. The film stars Udhaya and Manya, with Ramji, Charmila, Kalairani, Vaiyapuri, Chaplin Balu and Thadi Balaji playing supporting roles. The film, produced by Vaidhyanathan, was released on 3 July 2009.

== Plot ==
The film begins with the saddened Rudhra (Udhaya) thinking of his lover Sindhu (Manya) and remembering his past.

Rudhra and his friends (Ramji, Vaiyapuri, Chaplin Balu, Thadi Balaji) were jobless young men and lived in a lodge together in Chennai. Rudhra's friend Vino then found a job abroad. One day, Rudhra got a job opportunity in a TV channel. The manager promised to hire him permanently if he successfully shot an annual festival in a remote village. There, Rudhra and his friends stayed in a house next to Sindhu's house for a day. Sindhu quarreled with them and stole the festival cassette to take revenge. After finishing the shooting, they went to stay with Rudhra's mother Kannamma (Kalairani), who was working in Sindhu's construction site. Sindhu taunted Rudhra at every occasion, and one day, she made him fall in a trap. A wounded Rudhra is rushed to the hospital, and when his mother donated her blood for him, the doctor found that she was suffering from a kidney ailment and needed urgent kidney transportation. A guilty Sindhu paid for the surgery. A few months later, Rudhra could not leave his vulnerable mother in this condition. Sindhu apologized to Rudhra for her mistake and revealed her love to him, but Rudhra did not believe her. When Rudhra's friends scolded him for rejecting Sindhu's love, Rudhra explained that he wanted first to get a job and offer food to his mother with his money. Before leaving the village, Sindhu swore that her love was true, and Rudhra told her to wait for him.

Rudhra was scolded by the TV channel for losing the cassette. He then worked hard as a street seller, postman, and waiter. When he returned to see Sindhu, her family told him that she had gotten married. Later, Rudhra saved Geetha (Charmila) from rowdies, and she then helped him by giving him a loan to start a video company. Over time, he developed his business and became rich. Rudhra and Geetha got engaged, and Vino returned from abroad to meet his friend Rudhra. He told him that he unexpectedly married Sindhu in a police station, but they did not live together. Vino decided to help Rudhra marry Sindhu, while Geetha decided to cancel the wedding. Rudhra then came to know that Sindhu took poison when she knew about his marriage, and Sindhu's father took her to the US for better treatment.

Back to the present, Rudhra is still waiting for his lover Sindhu. The film ends with a newspaper showing that Sindhu died in a plane crash.

== Cast ==
- Udhaya as Rudhra
- Manya as Sindhu
- Ramji as Vino
- Charmila as Geetha
- Kalairani as Kannamma, Rudhra's mother
- Vaiyapuri as Rudhra's friend
- Chaplin Balu as Rudhra's friend
- Thadi Balaji as Rudhra's friend
- Vinu Chakravarthy as Dhanapal
- Delhi Ganesh as Shiva Sankaran
- Anu Mohan as Manikkam
- Balu Anand
- Bharathi as Sindhu's friend

== Production ==
Director Ratheesh Ramayya made his return with Unnai Kan Theduthe under the banner Staar Makers International. Udhaya was selected to play the hero, while Manya was selected to play the heroine. Sirpy composed the music, P. S. Dharan took care of camera works and the editing was by D. Ezhumalai.

== Soundtrack ==
Unnai Kann Theduthe

Soundtrack album by Sirpy
- Released: 2009
- Recorded: 2009
- Genre: Feature film soundtrack
- Length: 33:39
- Producer: Sirpy

The film score and the soundtrack were composed by Sirpy. The soundtrack features five tracks with lyrics written by Palani Bharathi and P. Vijay. The audio was released alongside the audios of three other films.

Track	Song	Singer(s)	Duration
1	"Enge Antha Iraivan"	Krishnaraj	5:20
2	"Kagetha Puveni"	Unni Menon, K. S. Chithra	4:35
3	"Thai Thai"	Mano	4:46
4	"Thodu Paar"	Anuradha Sriram	4:52
5	"O Nathiya Va Nathiya"	Tippu, Janaki Iyer	4:50

== Release and reception ==
The film released on 3 July 2009 alongside four other films. A reviewer from Dinamani praised the performance of the actors and the dialogue but criticized the story and the screenplay.
