= Kadhal Agadhi =

2015 Indian film by Shami Thirumalai

- Official poster
- Directed by: Shami Thirumalai
- Starring: Harikumar; Mamta
- Cinematography: Shyam Raj
- Edited by: S. P. Ahamed
- Music by: Farhan Roshan
- Production company: Ramaiah Cine Creations
- Release date: 24 September 2015
- Country: India
- Language: Tamil

Kadhal Agadhi (transl. Refugee of love) is a 2015 Indian Tamil-language romantic crime film directed by Shami Thirumalai and starring Harikumar and Mamta.

== Plot ==
The film is about a gangster, Sathya, who is unable to express his love to Savitri because he is always around thugs.

== Cast ==
- Harikumar as Sathya
- Mamtha as Savitri
- Pandiarajan
- Devadarshini
- Pandi
- Singamuthu
- Lollu Sabha Manohar
- Sudarshan Raj
- Mamatha Ravath
- Baby Meenu
- Trichi Babu
- Mysore Manjula

== Production ==
The film was shot in Bangalore, Chennai and Hyderabad. One stunt sequence was shot in a cave in Hosur.

== Release and reception ==
The film was removed two days after being in theatres in 2015 and was re-released in 2016.

Malini Mannath of The New Indian Express wrote that "A passable action-centric entertainer, Kadhal Agadhi at the most a stepping stone for a debutant maker". A critic from Samayam criticised the film and gave the film a rating of one-and-a-half out of five stars.
