= Bellary Naga =

- Theatrical release poster
- Directed by: Dinesh Babu
- Written by: T A Shahid
- Produced by: K. Manju
- Starring: Vishnuvardhan; Mansi Pritam; Avinash
- Cinematography: Dinesh Babu
- Edited by: P. R. Soundar Raj
- Music by: L. N. Shastry
- Production company: Bindu Shree Films
- Release date: 9 October 2009
- Running time: 132 min
- Country: India
- Language: Kannada

Bellary Naga is a 2009 Indian Kannada-language romantic action film starring Vishnuvardhan, Mansi Pritam and Avinash. The film was directed by Dinesh Babu and is a remake of the Malayalam language film Rajamanikyam (2005) starring Mammootty. This was the last film of Kannada star Vishnuvardhan released just a couple of months before his death.

== Cast ==
- Vishnuvardhan as Bellary Naga aka Nagamanikyam
- Mansi Pritam
- Avinash as Vishwanath Gowda
- Chitra Shenoy
- Ramesh Bhat
- Rajesh Nataranga
- Shobaraj
- Dharma
- Shivaram
- Bank Janardhan
- Niranjan Sudhindra
- Honnavalli Krishna

== Release ==
The film was released on 9 October 2009 all over Karnataka. This was the last film of Vishnuvardhan, released just before his death on 30 December 2009. School Master and Aptharakshaka were released posthumously.

== Soundtrack ==
All the songs were composed and scored by L. N. Shastry.

Sl No	Song title	Singer(s)	Lyrics
1	"Jaagore Jaagore"	Tippu	V. Manohar
2	"Sanjeya Thampinalu"	K. S. Chithra	V. Manohar
3	"Haithlagori"	S. P. Balasubrahmanyam, L. N. Shastry	Kaviraj
4	"Mathhe Mathhe"	S. P. Balasubrahmanyam, Suma Shastry	Kaviraj
5	"Thingala Hombelaka"	L. N. Shastry	V. Manohar

== Reception ==
=== Critical response ===
The Times of India scored the film at 3.5 out of 5 stars and says ". L N Sastry has composed some good numbers. Keerthi Vishnuvardhan needs special mention for her excellent costumes. Palaniraj and Pambal Ravi have choreographed some excellent fights." R G Vijayasarathy of Rediff.com scored the film at 3 out of 5 stars and wrote "L N Shashtri's composition of the hip hop song Jagwaare Jaagwaare Jaga and Hait Lagori are good. His background music too is plus point. As always, director Baboo ensures very good technical work. All in all Bellary Naga is a breezy and enjoyable entertainer.The New Indian Express wrote "Bellary Naga" is a breezy, likeable entertainer. Despite its loudness, the film will be a treat for the class audience because of Vishnu's rocking performance."
