= Harikumar (actor) =

Indian actor

- Born: 27 April 1969 (age 57); Thrissur, Kerala, India
- Occupations: Film actor, director, producer, dance choreographer, singer
- Years active: 1991–present

Harikumar is an Indian actor and director, who has appeared in Tamil films. He is probably best known for his performance in his debut Thoothukudi (2006) and Madurai Sambavam (2009). Moreover, he has worked in over one-hundred films in Tamil, Telugu and Malayalam.

== Filmography ==
=== As actor ===
Year	Film	Role	Notes
1991	Idhayam	Singer	Special appearance in the song "Poongodithan Poothathamma"
1994	Ilaignar Ani	Murali	
1995	Baashha	Dancer	Special appearance in the song "Naan Autokaaran"
1995	Muthu	Dancer	Special appearance in the song "Oruvan Oruvan"
1997	Arunachalam	Dancer	Special appearance in the song "Athanda Ithanda"
1998	Kaadhale Nimmadhi	Dancer	Special appearance in the song "Kadhale Nimmathi"
1999	Ninaivirukkum Varai	Singer	Special appearance in the song "Oh Vennila Kadhal"
1999	Time	Srinivasa Murthy's friend	
2006	Thoothukudi	Mahadevan	
2007	Thirutham	Velmurugan/Karthik	
2009	Madurai Sambavam	Kutty	
2011	Bodinayakkanur Ganesan	Ganesan	
2015	Kadhal Agadhi	Sathya	
2021	Madurai Manikkuravan		
2023	Saandrithazh	Vellaichami	

=== As choreographer ===
Year	Film
2001	Narasimha
2002	Bala
2003	Iyarkai
2005	Oru Naal Oru Kanavu
2005	Kasthuri Maan
2022	Theal

=== As director ===
- Thoothukudi (2006) (credited although Sanjay Ram shot the film)
- Theal (2022)

=== As singer ===
- "Thealu Thealu"- Theal (2022)
