= Veeramum Eeramum =

- Poster
- Directed by: Sanjay Ram
- Written by: Sanjay Ram
- Produced by: Sanjay Ram
- Starring: Saravanan; Deepan Chakravarthy; Krishna; Dhanya Mary Varghese; Sudhakar Vasanth
- Cinematography: Leo D.
- Edited by: P. Sai Suresh
- Music by: Yugendran
- Production company: Lingam Theatres
- Release date: 5 October 2007
- Country: India
- Language: Tamil

Veeramum Eeramum is a 2007 Indian Tamil language gangster film directed by Sanjay Ram, which was released on 5 October 2007. It stars Saravanan, Deepan Chakravarthy, Dhanya Mary Varghese, and Sudhakar Vasanth.

== Plot ==
Shankar Ayya (Saravanan) is the 'godfather' of Tuticorin and the villages around it, where the Arivaal (sickle used as a weapon to kill) culture prevails. The villagers respect him because of his stature as a do-gooder and a man who helps the poor and needy. His enemies led by his cousin Semmarai Pandian, a cruel and cunning man with a nose ring (Sudhakar Vasanth) hate him due to decades old enmity between the two families. So blood flows as frequent gang wars take place, creating a law and order problem in the coastal area.

The Superintendent of Police, Veerasangili (Deepan Chakravarthy) is asked by the government to sort out and stop the gang wars. Remember the earlier SP had disappeared, trying to bring the feud to an end (actually he was chopped and his body was disposed of in the deep sea by Semmarai and his gang). Veerasangli is a more committed man, and he tries to negotiate peace, but fails to bring Semmarai to the table, even after threatening him with encounter death. Semmarai with a pathological hatred for Shankar is obstinate that he will never allow peace as long as Shankar family holds sway, and then plays dirty. What happens next is told in a compelling and gripping manner, leading to a stunning climax.

== Cast ==
- Saravanan as Shankar Ayya
- Deepan Chakravarthy as Veerasangili
- Sanjay Ram as Shankar Ayya's henchman
- Krishna as Deva
- Sonika
- Dhanya Mary Varghese as Muthuazhagi
- Anjusha
- Sudhakar Vasanth as Semmarai Pandian
- Alex

== Soundtrack ==
Soundtrack was composed by Yugendran.

- "Maane Mayilazhage" - K. S. Chithra. Yugendran
- "Oru Kshanam" - Harish Raghavendra, Srilekha Parthsarathy
- "Purusha Payale" - Karthik, Prashanthi
- "Vaanam Thottu" - Yugendran
- "Sapam Pudicha" - Swarnalatha

== Reception ==
S. R. Ashok Kumar of The Hindu wrote "Director Sanjayram, who has also taken care of the story, screenplay, dialogue, lyrics and production, has done a good job as far as the dialogue, lyrics and production are concerned. However, he should have concentrated on the screenplay, as this kind of storyline has been handled better in Tamil cinema." Sify wrote, "Veeramum Eeramum is definitely a happening film that shows that Tamil films are coming of age. Sanjay Ram needs a pat on his back for making a film on the violent gang wars of southern Tamilnadu without showing gruesome violence or blood on screen! The look and feel of the film will be talked about". Iniya of Kalki wrote courage and wetness are okay in the screenplay but what is missing is the spice and essence. Malini Mannath of Chennai Online wrote "Gang wars set in a rural milieu and the locations well chosen; actors selected with care to suitably fit the characters; the nativity maintained in the ambience, the dialect and the look of the characters; and a racy narrative style. These are some of the hallmarks of a Sanjayram film. The creative brain behind 'Thoothukudi' and the director of 'Aadu Puliyattam', Sanjayram comes out with yet another action-packed entertainer that carries his trademark, and makes for some engaging viewing".
