= Maragatha Veenai (TV series) =

Indian television series

- மரகத வீணை
- Genre: Soap opera
- Written by: Raangini Thiliga (1-245); Vasubharthi Shivashankaran (246-1102) Dialogues by Vasubharthi Shivashankaran
- Screenplay by: Muthukumaraswamy; K.R.Rajagopalan
- Creative directors: S.Siddhiq; Madhu Mohan
- Starring: Santhoshi; Kumar; Sangeetha; Raja; Manokaran; R. N. Sudarshan; Vetrivelan
- Theme music composer: Dhina
- Opening theme: "Aararo Tharathe"
- Country of origin: India
- Original language: Tamil
- No. of seasons: 4
- No. of episodes: 1102

Production
- Cinematography: Sudhirbabu
- Editors: V.Sinjai Raju; Tamilmani Shankar
- Running time: approx. 20-22 minutes per episode
- Production company: Cine Times Entertainment

Original release
- Network: Sun TV
- Release: 27 January 2014 – 28 September 2017

Maragatha Veenai is a 2014 Indian Tamil-language soap opera that aired on Sun TV. The show ran from 27 January 2014 to 28 September 2017 and aired Monday through Saturday for 1,102 episodes.

The show starred Santhoshi, Kumar, Sangeetha, Raja, Manokaran and Deepa. This show was produced by Cine Time Entertainment and directed by L.Muthukumaraswamy, P.Selvam, O.N Rathnam and Vasubharthi Shivashankaran for 1102 episodes. It also airs in Sri Lanka Tamil Channel on Shakthi TV.

== Synopsis ==
The main story of Maragatha Veenai serial lies on two protagonists, namely Divya and Shankar. The serial captures their relationship and how the duo faces challenges to come up in life. Neema is a woman who decides to start her life anew and live a happy life. However, she faces many challenges, hurdles and problems that compel her to hide her identity from the world and go on with her life.

Divya, a young girl, faces several problems when she tries to fight for independence from the life that was forced upon her.

== Cast ==
=== Main cast ===
- Neema (2012– February 2015) (Epi. 1-315) → Reshma Pasupuleti (March 2015) (Epi. 320-368) → Santhoshi (April 2015 – 2017) (From Epi. 369-1102) as Divya
- L.Muthukumarsamy as Raja
- Sangeetha Sheedy as Kavitha
- Ramya as Saraswathi
- Sreeja as Kathiravaselvi (1-321)
- Poorni as Jyothi

=== Recurring cast ===
- Deepa Shankar as Dhanam, Raja's mother
- Manokaran krishna as Subhu
- Apsara as Radha
- Navindhar as Navin
- Fawaz Zayani as ACP Karuppusamy
- Kumar
- Shyam Sundhar/Kurinji Nathan as Madhavan
- Sailasri
- K. R. Selvaraj
- Issac Verghese
- Alex Pandiyan
- Krithiga
- Saif as Krishnan, Radha's husband
- Sudharshan
- Geetha Ravi Shankar as Bhagyalaksmi
- Raja as Shankar, sarsu's brother
- Divya Bharathi as Gayathri
- Vetrivelan as Suresh
- Kumaresan as Raja's uncle
- Thilla as Divya's father (Died in serial)
- Sharadha Nayaki/ Deepika as Parvathi
- Shiva Ranjani /Ganga as Rekha
- Udhay
- --- as Raja's father
- Durai Raj as Raghu
- Hema Rajkumar as Nandhini
- Jenooya as Nimmi/Nirmala
- Pandan/Sundrapandian
- Subramani
- Divya Krishnan

== Original soundtrack ==
=== Title song ===
It was written by Yugabharathi, composed by Kiran and Re Recording by Dhina. It was sung by Haricharan.

=== Soundtrack ===
Tracklist
No.	Title	Lyrics	Singer(s)	Length
1.	"Aararo Thalatte Yarale Yarale (ஆராரோ தாலாட்டே யாராலே யாராலே)"	Yugabharathi	Haricharan	3:30
