= Kelvikuri =

- Directed by: Jailani
- Written by: Jailani
- Produced by: Jailani; K. Manikandan
- Starring: Jailani; Sona Heiden; Preethi Varma
- Cinematography: K. V. Mani
- Edited by: Madhavan; Rajesh Karna
- Music by: G. Sathya Prasath
- Production companies: 18th Cross Pictures; MJD Productions
- Release date: 30 November 2007
- Running time: 110 minutes
- Country: India
- Language: Tamil

Kelvikuri (transl. Question Mark) is a 2007 Indian Tamil language thriller film directed by Jailani. The film stars Jailani, Sona Heiden, and Preethi Varma, with Karikalan, Scissor Manohar, Sampath Ram, Mudhalvan Mahendran, and Viji playing supporting roles. The film was released on 30 November 2007.

== Plot ==
The film begins with a severely injured man Bala (Jailani) sneaking into the house of the police commissioner Thirunavakkarasu (Mudhalvan Mahendran). His daughter Maya (Preethi Varma) gets ready to elope with her boyfriend. Bala makes his wife Shalini (Viji) and Maya captives with his gun and forces them to bring back Thirunavakkarasu. When Thirunavakkarasu comes home, Bala brutally attacks him and gets tied up with his chair. Bala asks him about his wife who was last seen in his police station for an enquiry. Bala then forces Thirunavakkarasu to call some of the police personals: three constables, one head constable and two sub-inspectors, to the house using the commissioner as his captive. Bala holds everyone as a hostage and starts to enquire them about the disappearance of his wife: Bala beats them up like a policeman would beat an ordinary citizen in a police lockup. The police force and the commando force surround the house.

Bala who is urged to see his wife forces Thirunavakkarasu to speak to the police. Thirunavakkarasu orders the assistant commissioner Kathiresan (Karikalan) to kill him when he has the opportunity to. Bala then photographs the hostages and sent the photos via mail to all the media. The media comes to the place and the journalists start questioning Kathiresan, Karikalan has no other choice but to bring his wife in an ambulance. To stop all this masquerade, Bala orders him to show his wife on the spot. Kathiresan shows him and the media the body of his dead wife. The night, Ganja Samy (Scissor Manohar) comes to see Bala and tells him that he was in the police station when his wife was interrogated by the police.

His wife Divya (Sona Heiden) worked in a chit-fund company and one day, her boss ran away with all public money. The police started investigating the case and suspected Divya of stealing the money. The first day, the couple went to the police station and Divya gave her written statement to the constables in which she explained that she was innocent. The second day, Sub-inspector Rajendran (Sampath Ram) under the pressure of a politician asked the couple to come to the police station and started to threaten them, he then let them go home. The third day, he brought them to the police station and Bala was beaten up by Rajendran and the constables. In the meantime, Sub-inspector Bhanumathi (Raji) brutally tortured Divya in police lock-up and Divya died of her injuries. The police let Bala go and told him that Divya confessed guilt and had an affair with her former boss. Bala then met the commissioner Thirunavakkarasu and begged him to save his wife, but he chose to remain deaf to the men's pleas.

Bala exposes about the brutally of the police to the press. He then calls the minister and requests him an unbiased and dutiful interrogation in the police station and CCTV cameras inside the station. The following day, Bala is shot dead by Kathiresan and the minister promises to fulfil Bala's requests.

== Cast ==
- Jailani as Bala
- Sona Heiden as Divya
- Preethi Varma as Maya
- Karikalan as AC Kathiresan
- Scissor Manohar as Ganja Samy
- Sampath Ram as SI Rajendran
- Mudhalvan Mahendran as Commissioner Thirunavakkarasu
- Viji as Shalini
- Seth Govindhan as Govindhan
- Raji as SI Bhanumathi
- Citizen Sivakumar as Thirunavakkarasu's father
- Vincent Albert as Dr. Narayanamoorthy
- Madurai Joseph as Constable Paramasivam
- Bhaskar as Constable Sethuraman
- Gokulraj as Minister
- Pradeep Kumar as Head Constable Raju
- Girija as Lady Constable

== Production ==
Jailani, who was working in United Kingdom, made his directorial debut with Kelvikuri, which he co-produced and acted in. Sona Heiden made her debut as a heroine while Preethi Varma was selected as the second heroine.

== Soundtrack ==
Kelvikuri

Soundtrack album by G. Sathya Prasath
- Released: 2007
- Recorded: 2007
- Genre: Feature film soundtrack
- Length: 7:04
- Producer: G. Sathya Prasath

The film score and the soundtrack were composed by G. Sathya Prasath. The soundtrack features two tracks.

All lyrics are written by Palani Bharathi.

Tracklist
No.	Title	Singer(s)	Length
1.	"Un Kangal Pada Padavena"	Karthik, Vinaya	5:04
2.	"Shala"	Subhashree	2:00
Total length:			7:04

== Release and reception ==
The film was released on 30 November 2007 alongside four other films. The film was initially denied censor certificate by Central Board of Film certification as they found the film for depicting police force in poor light.

A reviewer rated the film 3 out of 5 and said, "A brilliant effort to portray the dark side of our law and order system, the movie is worth appreciating. Though there are loose ends like a weak script and unrealistic scenes". Another reviewer called the film an "apt repartee", and praised the film's message, music and cinematography but criticised the direction. Another critic lauded the film's message and criticised the lack of logic. Chennai Online called it "a fairly engaging action-thriller with a pertinent message for the law enforcers".
