= Iyakkam =

- Directed by: Sanjay Ram
- Written by: Sanjay Ram
- Produced by: Sanjay Ram
- Starring: Rishi Kumar; Shruthi Raj; Sujibala
- Cinematography: D. Leo
- Edited by: P. Sai Suresh
- Music by: Pravin Mani
- Production company: Lingam Theatres
- Release date: 25 April 2008
- Running time: 120 minutes
- Country: India
- Language: Tamil

Iyakkam (transl. Movement) is a 2008 Tamil language action film produced, written and directed by Sanjay Ram. The film stars newcomer Rishi Kumar, Shruthi Raj and Sujibala, with Sanjay Ram, Sudhakar Vasanth, R. Sundarrajan, Chitti Babu, M. S. Bhaskar and Poovilangu Mohan playing supporting roles. It was released on 25 April 2008.

== Plot ==
In Chennai, two high-profile figures are killed and the police commissioner Muthu Kali takes charge of the case. From here, the film is narrated in a non-linear plot.

Nallathambi moves in a slum in Chennai and poses as an orphan. He then meets the soft-spoken Sarasu and saved her from a local don who harassed her to marry him, Sarasu falls in love with Nallathambi. Nallathambi then shoots dead an advocate in his office. During his escape, Muthu Kali shoots Nallathambi in the leg and his prosthetic leg fell off. Muthu Kali finds out that three victims grew up in an orphanage, a team were behind the murders and the last murderer had lost his leg recently. Sarasu gets the approval of her family to marry Nallathambi. In the meantime, Nallathambi befriends with Muthu Kali's wife Seetha, he invited her and her husband to attend his wedding. The day of the wedding, Nallathambi has disappeared and the wedding is cancelled. Meanwhile, Muthu Kali and his wife arrive at a remote place, and Nallathambi shoots Muthu Kali dead from a hidden place and flees the crime scene. Later, Nallathambi meets Sarasu and tells her everything.

In the past, Nallathambi real name was Meyyan, he was a district collector and lived with his uncle Muthukutty. He was deeply in love with his neighbour Malar and they eventually got married. Aandavar was an influential person who was involved in humanitarian activities and strongly believed in astrology. He ran an orphanage for his self-interest and he ordered the day and time of delivery of each baby to match his manufactured horoscope favourable to him. Using the caesarian procedure in the belief that bringing up such babies in his home would prolong his life. Nallathambi learned Aandavar killed the previous district collector. He then met Chinna Marudhu, a leader of a militant organization who fought against injustice, and he told Nallathambi about Aandavar's illegal activities and the next day, Nallathambi had the police arrest Aandavar. Nallathambi discovered that he was born in Aandavar's orphanage and his mother died during the delivery because the doctors forced her to delay it, Nallathambi then became a district collector due to Aandavar's financial help. A vengeful Aandavar set fire to Nallathambi's house and his family members perished. To take revenge on Aandavar, Nallathambi resigned his post as a collector and joined Chinna Marudhu's organization.

Back to the present, Nallathambi pleads Sarasu to forget him. The Chief Minister under Aandavar's influence has given free rein to the police to dismantle Chinna Marudhu's organization and they bring Chinna Marudhu alive to Aandavar's house. Aandavar requests Chinna Marudhu to join him and to kill Nallathambi or he will kill all the members of his organization. Nallathambi decides to sacrifice his life for the organization and Chinna Marudhu shot him dead. One year later, Chinna Marudhu works for Aandavar and he is waiting for the right moment to kill Aandavar.

== Cast ==
- Rishi Kumar as Nallathambi / Meyyan
- Shruthi Raj as Sarasu
- Sujibala as Malar
- Sanjay Ram as Chinna Marudhu
- Sudhakar Vasanth as Aandavar
- R. Sundarrajan as Punniyakodi
- Chitti Babu as Appusamy
- M. S. Bhaskar as Muthukutty
- Poovilangu Mohan as an astrologer
- Omakuchi Narasimhan
- Nellai Siva
- Scissor Manohar
- Bonda Mani
- Chaplin Balu
- Pandu
- Risha in a special appearance

== Soundtrack ==
Iyakkam

Soundtrack album by Pravin Mani
- Released: 30 March 2008
- Recorded: 2008
- Genre: Feature film soundtrack
- Length: 25:56
- Producer: Pravin Mani

Pravin Mani chronology
Thirutham (2007)	Iyakkam (2008)	Chikku Bukku (2010)

The film score and the soundtrack were composed by Pravin Mani. The soundtrack features 6 tracks with lyrics written by Ilaya Kamban. The audio was launched on 30 March 2008 by Shaam and Suriya in Chennai.

Track	Song	Singer(s)	Duration
1	"Enthan Uyire"	Pradeep, Shweta Mohan	4:37
2	"Aalamaathu"	Shyam	4:02
3	"Olaiakka"	Manikka Vinayagam	4:46
4	"Vuthattoram"	Ranjith, Malathy Lakshman, Swarnalatha	4:27
5	"Singandaa"	Deepan Chakravarthy, Sriram Parthasarathy	3:39
6	"Veecharuva Kottaiyila"	Sujatha Mohan, Swarnalatha	4:25

== Reception ==
S. R. Ashok Kumar of The Hindu criticized the comedy segment but praised the artists' performance and the cinematography and added, "weak screenplay dilutes the concept".
