= Taarak =

2003 Telugu film

- Official poster
- Directed by: Balasekaran
- Written by: Paruchuri Brothers (dialogues)
- Screenplay by: Balasekharan
- Story by: Vijaya Creations Unit
- Produced by: Achanta Gopinadh
- Starring: Taraka Ratna; Sharmili; Krishna
- Cinematography: Poorna
- Edited by: Ravindra Babu
- Music by: Mani Sharma
- Release date: April 3, 2003
- Country: India
- Language: Telugu

Taarak is a 2003 Indian Telugu-language romantic drama film directed by Balasekaran and starring Taraka Ratna, Sharmili and Krishna.

== Cast ==
- Nandamuri Taraka Ratna as Taraka "Taarak" Ram
- Sharmili as Varsha
- Krishna as Jagadish Prasad
- Jaya Prakash Reddy as JP
- Banerjee as College lecturer
- Giri Babu
- Tanikella Bharani
- L. B. Sriram
- Dharmavarapu Subramanyam
- Sudhakar
- Chitram Srinu
- Ali
- Srinivasa Reddy
- Suman Setty
- Kaushal
- Murali Mohan (guest appearance)
- Siva Krishna (guest appearance)
- Seetu Singh (special song)

== Production ==
Sharmili made her Telugu debut with this film.

== Soundtrack ==
The music composed by Mani Sharma was well received.

Track listing
No.	Title	Lyrics	Singer(s)	Length
1.	"Vennela Kala"	Veturi	Charan, Nitya Santhoshini	5:17
2.	"Alakalu Ela"	Sai Harsha	K. J. Yesudas	5:08
3.	"Mellanga Raavo"	Shakti	Udit Narayan, Suneetha	4:46
4.	"Esko Esko"	Vijay Kumar	Karthik, Radhika	5:07
5.	"Sarasamika Sunday"	Chandrabose	Tippu, Sujatha Mohan	4:12
6.	"Vanakalamani"	Chandrabose	Mano	4:30
Total length:				29:00

== Release and reception ==
The film was scheduled to release on 11 April 2003 but was advanced to 3 April 2003.

Gudipoori Srihari of The Hindu opined that "The film has a vague story line and appears to have been influenced by a Hollywood movie. The characters are not well supported by dialogue. Tarak Ratna is a shade better and confident than what he looked in his earlier two films". Jeevi of Idlebrain.com gave the film a rating of three out of five and said that "The director tried to create an impact of that using the flashback. But the narrative meanders from the basic objective towards the love track between hero and heroine". Mithun Verma of Full Hyderabad wrote that "The movie's intentions were sacred, aiming at the increasingly suicidal youth. But the execution will definitely not decrease any, to say the least".
