= Sanjay Ram =

Indian film director and producer

- Occupations: Director, screenwriter, producer
- Years active: 2003–present

Sanjay Ram is an Indian film director, screenwriter, and producer who has worked on Tamil films and was active in the late 2000s. Throughout his career, he worked on several films which failed to have a theatrical release. Furthermore, several of his films have been criticised for their gore content and excessive bloodshed on screen.

== Career ==
Sanjay Ram began his career by penning the script for the film Shree (2002) and Anbe Anbe (2003). Sanjay Ram worked on two village centric action films in 2006; Thoothukudi featuring choreographer Harikumar and Aadu Puli Attam featuring newcomers. Thootukudi won positive reviews and became a surprise success at the box office. He then made the Saravanan-starrer Veeramum Eeramum (2007) and Iyakkam (2008), which he also produced. In 2008, Sanjay Ram worked on Sivamayam, a tale based on the Mahabharata, featuring Shaam, Megha Nair, Sridevika and Prakash Raj in the lead roles. Despite beginning shoot in Chennai and Coimbatore and recording songs, the film did not have a theatrical release. Furthermore, another film he worked titled Surla featuring Ajay Krishna and Sanchita Shetty also failed to have a theatrical release. He also announced a film titled Lingam with Mammootty and Sarath Kumar, but the project did not materialise. Sanjay Ram worked on a film titled Poova Thalaiya during 2008 with Udhaya and Shirin, but the film ran into production troubles. As the film geared up for release in 2011, Shirin complained to the Nadigar Sangam that Sanjay Ram was trying to release the film without finishing her portions. The film then had a low key release in 2011.

Sanjay Ram's next release was the family drama, Gowravargal (2010) starring Sathyaraj and Vignesh, which was jointly produced by ten financiers. Sanjay Ram next worked on a film title Sethu Samuthiram with Sarath Kumar, but the film was later dropped. He then began work on a multi-hero gangster subject titled Karuvarai Kutravaligal with himself, Ajay Krishna and Vaali in the lead roles but the film did not complete production. Likewise another project featuring Ajay Krishna, titled Meenkothi, was similarly incomplete. In 2012, he began work on the comedy drama film titled Kutralam, which was later rechristened as Rosa, starring Vaali and himself in the lead roles alongside Neenu Karthika but the film also failed to have a theatrical release.

In 2013, he began a film titled Kiliyanthattu: Thoothukudi 2, a sequel to his earlier film. Despite having an audio launch event, yet again, the film did not have a theatrical release.

== Filmography ==
Year	Title	Credited as			Notes
Year	Title	Director	Writer	Producer	Notes
2003	Anbe Anbe		Story, dialogues		
2006	Thoothukudi	Uncredited	Yes		
2006	Aadu Puli Attam	Yes	Yes		
2007	Veeramum Eeramum	Yes	Yes	Yes	Also actor
2008	Iyakkam	Yes	Yes	Yes	
2010	Gowravargal	Yes	Yes		
2011	Poova Thalaiya	Yes	Yes	Yes	
