= Preethi Varma =

Indian actress

- Born: India
- Occupation: Actress
- Years active: 2002–present

Preethi Varma is an Indian actress, known for her work in Tamil cinema. In the 2000s, she played lead roles in mid-budget Indian films.

== Career ==
After making her debut in a supporting role in the Sathyaraj-starrer Maaran (2002), Preethi portrayed 13 lead roles in Tamil and Telugu language films throughout the mid to late 2000s. Notably, she appeared alongside S. J. Suryah in Thirumagan (2007), portraying a rural belle.

== Personal life ==
Preethi Varma was born to Bharath Kumar and Ramya. In February 2007, Preethi Varma garnered coverage in the media for eloping from home in Rajamundry to move in with her boyfriend in Mumbai. Her parents filed a missing person complaint, with Preethi later clarifying that she had not been abducted and was safe elsewhere. In return, she filed a complaint against her parents for allegedly attempting to push her into prostitution. She later reconciled with her parents.

During the period, she was working on 18 Vayasu Puyale (2007), which had a similar scene for Preethi of escaping home with her boyfriend against her parents' wishes.

== Filmography ==
Key
†	Denotes films that have not yet been released

- Note: all films are in Tamil, unless otherwise noted.

Year	Film	Role	Notes
2002	Maaran	Amudha	
2003	Enakku 20 Unakku 18	College student	uncredited role
2003	Nee Manasu Naaku Telusu	College student	Telugu film
2004	Aarumugasaamy		
2004	Kadhale Jayam	Viji	
2004	Iyyappa Saamy		
2005	Veeranna	Aishwarya	
2006	Theenda Theenda	Valli	
2006	Jayanth		
2007	Thirumagan	Raasathi	
2007	Anbu Thozhi		
2007	18 Vayasu Puyale	Pooja, Gayathri	
2007	Kelvikuri	Maya	
2007	Ramudu Manchi Baludu		Telugu film
2008	Pachai Nirame	Asha	
2023	Moondram Pournami		
