= Sona Heiden =

Indian actress

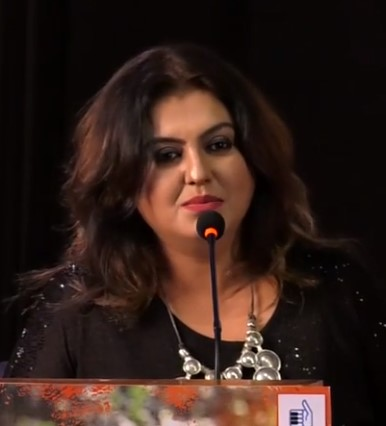
- Sona Heiden
- Born: 1 June 1979 (age 47)
- Occupations: Actress, Entrepreneur, Producer
- Years active: 2001–present

Sona Heiden is an Indian actress, entrepreneur and film producer.

== Filmography ==
As actress

Year	Film	Role	Language	Notes
2001	Poovellam Un Vaasam	Anitha	Tamil	
2001	Shahjahan	Sujatha	Tamil	
2003	Aayudham		Telugu	
2003	Veede		Telugu	Special appearance
2003	Villain		Telugu	
2004	Andhrawala		Telugu	
2005	Pon Megalai	Uma	Tamil	
2006	Sivappathigaram	Amusuvalli	Tamil	Special appearance
2007	Kelvikuri	Divya	Tamil	
2007	Mirugam	Savithri	Tamil	
2008	Roudram	Subhadra	Malayalam	
2008	Swarnam	Aachipennu	Malayalam	Guest appearance
2008	Pathu Pathu	Mohini	Tamil	
2008	Kuselan	Sona	Tamil	
2008	Kathanayakudu	Sona	Telugu	
2008	Parthan Kanda Paralokam	Poonkodi	Malayalam	
2009	Namyajamanru		Kannada	
2009	Venal Maram	Muthulakshmi	Malayalam	
2009	Guru En Aalu	Suguna	Tamil	
2009	Nari		Malayalam	
2009	Azhagar Malai		Tamil	Guest appearance
2011	Ko	Reshma Kothari	Tamil	
2012	Onbadhula Guru	Kumudhu Teacher	Tamil	
2012	Karmayodha	Selena Madam	Malayalam	
2013	Sokkali		Tamil	
2013	Mizhi	Sushila	Malayalam	
2013	Veerachozhan		Tamil	
2013	Kathayallithu Jeevitham		Malayalam	
2014	Yaamirukka Bayamey	Herself	Tamil	Cameo appearance
2014	Ninaivil Nindraval		Tamil	
2014	Aamayum Muyalum	Panjavarnam	Malayalam	
2015	Amar Akbar Anthony	Usha	Malayalam	
2015	Rombha Nallavan Da Nee	Councelour	Tamil	
2015	Ellam Chettante Ishtam Pole	Vasundhara	Malayalam	
2016	Jithan 2		Tamil	
2016	Oppam	Sardarji's wife	Malayalam	
2016	Virumandikkum Sivanandikkum		Tamil	
2017	Brahma.com	Vanangamudi's wife	Tamil	
2018	Odu Raja Odu	Mythilli	Tamil	
2018	Johnny	Ram's wife	Tamil	
2018	My Story	Dance master	Malayalam	
2019	Vilambaram		Tamil	Special appearance
2019	Isakkinte Ithihasam	Doly	Malayalam	
2019	Poovalliyum Kunjadum	Sunanda Manohar	Malayalam	
2020	Pacha Manga	Sujatha	Malayalam	
2021	Paramapadham Vilayattu	Manimozhi	Tamil	
2021	Chasing	Sona	Tamil	
2021	Sigappu Manithargal		Tamil	
2023	En 6 Vaathiyaar Kaalpanthatta Kuzhu		Tamil	
2023	Sri Sabari Ayyappan		Tamil	
2024	Boomer Uncle		Tamil	

=== Production ===
Year	Film	Director	Notes
2010	Kanimozhi	Sripathy Rangasamy	

=== Television ===
Year	Serial	Role	Language	Channel
2021	Sillunu Oru Kaadhal	Herself	Tamil	Colors Tamil
2021–2022	Abhi Tailor	Neelambari	Tamil	Colors Tamil
2022	Roja	Neelambari	Tamil	Sun TV
2022–2023	Maari	Thara	Tamil	Zee Tamil
