= Aasai Aasaiyai =

- Poster
- Directed by: Ravi Mariya
- Written by: Ravi Mariya
- Produced by: R. B. Choudary
- Starring: Jiiva; Sharmelee
- Cinematography: Pavan Sekhar
- Edited by: Jayshanker
- Music by: Mani Sharma
- Production company: Super Good Films
- Release date: 31 January 2003
- Country: India
- Language: Tamil

Aasai Aasaiyai (Note: Spelt on the CBFC certificate as Aasai Aasaiya.) is a 2003 Indian Tamil-language romance film directed by Ravi Mariya. This film was the debut of the producer R. B. Choudary's son, Jiiva, and also stars Sharmelee. The music was composed by Mani Sharma. Song lyrics were penned by Vairamuthu and Ravi Mariya. The film's title is based on a song from Aanandham (2001), which was also produced by the same studio, Super Good Films.

== Plot ==
The story revolves around Vinod, who aspires to become a businessman after completing his bachelor's degree. His parents keep nudging him to find a job. He also works part-time as a private detective. He is assigned a detective job to follow a girl and find out her general activities and also if she is in love with anyone. While doing this job, he eventually falls in love with the girl Brinda (Sharmelee) and quits his detective job. Brinda, who is the daughter of a rich gold seller Sankaranarayanan (Nasser), has a policy to not love anyone as her sister eloped with a guy in the past and her father had suffered a heart attack. But eventually, Brinda falls in love with Vinod.

Vinod and Brinda come to an agreement that both should prioritize their goals first and they should never meet unless their goals are met. Vinod aspires to start a business of his own while Brinda aspires to complete her college degree with high scores. Vinod starts an apparel showroom and grows big. He is also made the secretary of traders association for which Sankaranarayanan is the president. Vinod gets into good books of Sankaranarayanan due to his hard working nature and good manners. Similarly Brinda finishes her education with flying colours and awards.

Sankaranarayanan arranges Brinda's wedding with his friend Srinivasan's (Anandraj) son, an IAS officer. But Srinivas with the help of a detective Ravi (Ravi Mariya) understands about Brinda's love for Vinod and their intention to prioritize family and goals first. Srinivasan reveals this to Sankaranayan and he feels proud of Brinda and he agrees to get her married to Vinod. Finally, Vinod and Brinda are reunited.

== Cast ==
- Jiiva as Vinod
- Sharmelee as Brinda
- Vijayakumar as Ramakrishnan, Vinod's father
- Nassar as Sankaranarayanan Brinda's father
- Anandaraj as Srinivasan IPS, the Chennai City Police Commissioner
- J. Livingston
- Ramesh Khanna as Vinod's brother
- Ravi Mariya as Ravi
- Kakaji as Sixteen Vinod s friend
- Srividya as Vinod's mother
- Santhoshi as Vinod's sister
- Yuvarani as Vinod's sister-in-law
- S. N. Lakshmi as Brinda's grandmother
- T. S. Raghavendra as Shop owner
- Singamuthu
- Vishal as Vrindesh
- Siva Narayana Murthy as Sandhanapandian
- Bava Lakshmanan
- Ravi Shanth
- Lekhasri
- Lavanya as Swetha
- Ghajini as Swetha's husband
- Raghava Lawrence in a special appearance
- Vindhya in a special appearance

== Production ==
The film marked the directorial debut of Ravi Mariya who earlier worked as assistant to S. J. Suryah.

== Soundtrack ==
Soundtrack was composed by Mani Sharma.

Song	Singers	Lyrics
"Ilamai Enbathu"	Tippu, Ranjith	Vairamuthu
"Jinu Jinu"	Karthik	Ravi Mariya
"Kadhal Oru"	Sujatha	Vairamuthu
"Kannam Sivakka"	Mahalakshmi Iyer, Ranjith	Vairamuthu
"Theeppori Pondrathu"	Karthik, K. S. Chithra	Vairamuthu
"Yeh Penne"	Ranjith	Vairamuthu

== Reception ==
Malathi Rangarajan of The Hindu said, "Jerks in the narration and unexplained sequences make certain situations appear distorted [...] Nearly every Mani Sharma number reminds you of an old song" and concluded, "Supergood Films could have surely done better in its 50th venture". Sify wrote, "The story, screenplay, dialogues and direction are credited to debutant Ravi Mariya, but sadly the film fails to impress. The film is a rehash of many love stories in the past including Fazil's Kadhalukku Mariyadhai" and added, "The debutant boy Jeeva is cool and has done his homework well. He proves to be star material while TV anchor Sharmilee is disappointing".

Visual Dasan of Kalki wrote since this is Ravi Mariya's first test match he felt local pitch is safe so he has taken a romantic subject in his hands while praising the performances of Jiiva and Sharmilee and concluded saying won't strong batsmen, talented all-rounders, and most importantly a captain who doesn't slip when the pitch is not right, lose the game? clearly understanding this cricket formula, the team of Aasai Aasaiyai has been on the field until the end. Indiainfo wrote "Debutant director has tried to present the film in a new way. To some extent, he has delivered the goods. The film is predictable with an ordinary theme". Chennai Online wrote "The debutant director steers his love-story skillfully through its ups and downs. There is freshness in the way the love develops, and a message weaved in for the younger generation. There are shades of ‘Khushi’ in the earlier scenes of the boy-girl encounters though. Not surprising, because Ravi Mariya has had his apprenticeship with S J Surya. ‘Aasai Aasaiyai’ is yet another fairly engaging entertainer from Supergood films".
