= Thoothukudi (film) =

- DVD cover
- Directed by: Harikumar
- Written by: Sanjay Ram
- Produced by: Sunitha Hari
- Starring: Harikumar; Karthika; Swetha
- Cinematography: M. Jeevan
- Edited by: P. Sai Suresh
- Music by: Pravin Mani
- Production company: Fourbro Films
- Release date: 14 July 2006
- Country: India
- Language: Tamil

Thoothukudi is a 2006 Indian Tamil-language crime action film set in the Thoothukudi district of Tamil Nadu directed by Harikumar, a dance choreographer, and written by Sanjay Ram. The film also starred Harikumar in the lead role alongside Karthika and Rahman.

== Cast ==
- Harikumar as Mahadevan
- Karthika as Mallika
- Rahman as Lingam
- Navin Balaji as Esaki
- Swetha as Esaki's wife
- Sudhakar Vasanth

== Production ==
The film marked the acting debut of dance choreographer Harikumar and actress Karthika in leading roles. Karthika was cast in the film after the makers had spotted her in a commercial. The relative success of the film prompted Karthika to be labelled as 'Thootukudi' Karthika or 'Karuvappaiya' Karthika by the media.

== Music ==
Pravin Mani composed the music. The song "Karuvappaiya" attained popularity prior to release, with Karthika's display in the song noted. Following the album, Pravin and Harikumar came together again for their next venture, Thirutham.

Track listing
No.	Title	Singer(s)	Length
1.	"Sollamal"	Haricharan
2.	"Yethipodu"	Manicka Vinayagam, Malathy Lakshman
3.	"Ka Viduvom"	Pushpavanam Kuppusamy
4.	"Karuvappaiya"	K. S. Chithra, Tippu
5.	"Kozhukkatta"	Sujatha Mohan, Karthik
6.	"Pulam Pulam"	Srinivas

== Reception ==
Sify gave the film a negative review and wrote that "On the whole, the script is wafer thin, there is no logic and is too dark and morbid". Malini Mannath of Chennai Online noted that "Though it's a predictable storyline, the director has attempted to bring in slight variations and the film does have its interesting moments and elements". A critic from Cinesouth wrote that "'Thoothukudi' is a decent action thriller".

== Sequel ==
In 2013, screenwriter Sanjay Ram began working on a sequel titled Kiliyanthattu Thoothukudi 2, and would also act in it.
