= Thirutham =

2007 Tamil film

- VCD cover
- Directed by: Ponram
- Written by: Ponram
- Produced by: Sunee Hari
- Starring: Harikumar; Priyanka Nair; Mansi Pritam
- Cinematography: M. Jeevan
- Edited by: B. S. Vasu; Saleem
- Music by: Pravin Mani
- Production company: Foubro Films
- Release date: 14 September 2007
- Running time: 125 minutes
- Country: India
- Language: Tamil

Thirutham (transl. Correction) is a 2007 Indian Tamil language romantic thriller film directed by Ponram (credited as Ponraman) in his directoral debut. The film stars Harikumar, Priyanka Nair and Mansi Pritam, with Nassar, Adithya, M. S. Bhaskar, Suja Varunee, Priya, Vijay Babu and Bharathi playing supporting roles. The film, produced by Sunee Hari, was released on 14 September 2007, and did not perform well at the box office.

== Plot ==
The film begins with Karthik arriving in Bangalore to meet Priya, with whom he had a six-month online friendship. Karthik then takes an elderly couple from an old-age home with him to be his parents. Karthik seduces Priya and asks her parents to marry her with the help of his new parents. Her parents, who like his character, accept and they get married. However, the next morning, Priya is shocked to see her newly-wedded groom had disappeared with her jewels and money. Her uncle Saravanan, an assistant commissioner who is charged to catch Karthik, finally arrests him during his seventh wedding in Cochin. During the enquiry, Karthik falls into a coma and Saravanan finds in his things a prescription with the hospital address. Saravanan goes to the hospital and meets Dr. Shanmugam in Ooty. Shanmugam tells him everything.

Karthik, whose real name is Velmurugan, was Shanmugam's car driver and lived with his widowed mother in Ooty. His mother wanted him to get married, but all the women refused to marry him since he had a stammering mouth and an ugly-looking face. Therefore, Velmurugan developed an inferiority complex. Vandana, an aspiring house surgeon, came to Ooty for her training course and stayed in Shanmugam's house. Moved by Velmurugan's sad life, Vandana helped him overcome his stammering problem, and Velmurugan fell in love with her. One day, Vandana read Velmurugan's love letter and did not talk to him any more. After her training, she left Ooty and returned home. Priya, one of the nurses working in the same hospital, promised Velmurugan that she will bring them together. However, Priya scammed him: she posed as Vandana on the phone and talked to the innocent Velmurugan, and she enjoyed life with his hard-earned savings. When he discovered the scam, he was heartbroken. Thereafter, his mother died and he decided to end his life by falling into a ravine with his boss's car. However, he was heavily wounded and was brought to the hospital, where Shanmugam treated him. Velmurugan survived the accident but began to suffer from horrible headaches. He then underwent extensive plastic surgery on his face. Six months later, Velmurugan had become a handsome man and successfully overcame his inferiority complex, but he developed a superiority complex. Afterwards, he became a psychopath and married around five women (all named Priya) and eloped on the very next day with their jewels and valuable belongings.

Back to the present, Karthik manages to escape from the hospital and decides to go to Delhi to marry another girl named Priya, but before, he bumps into the nurse Priya. When he tries to fatally torture her, he becomes emotionally disturbed and faints. Admitted to the hospital, a worried Vandana comes to see Karthik, who is suffering from heavy headaches. Karthik begs her to kill him to relieve him from pain and suffering. Feeling guilty for what happened to him, Vandana euthanises him and is arrested by the police.

== Cast ==
- Harikumar as Velmurugan / Karthik
- Priyanka Nair as Vandana
- Mansi Pritam as Priya
- Nassar as Dr. Shanmugam
- Adithya as Saravanan
- M. S. Bhaskar as Punniyakodi
- Priya as Velmurugan's mother
- Vijay Babu as Priya's father
- Bharathi as Priya's mother
- Suja Varunee as Priya
- Singamuthu as Astrologer
- Nellai Siva as Head constable
- S. V. S. Kumar as Doctor
- Dishyum Soman
- Archana Harish as Priya
- Simran Khan in a special appearance

== Production ==
Ponraman, former assistant of S. A. Chandrasekaran made his directorial debut with Thirutham under the banner of Foubro Films. Harikumar was selected to play the lead role for the second time after Thoothukudi (2006). Veyil fame Priyanka Nair and newcomer Mansi Pritam were chosen to play the heroines. Jeeva took in charge of cinematography. After Thoothukudi, both Harikumar and music director Pravin Mani came together for this album. The filming was held at Ooty where few scenes and two songs were picturised while also shot at Kerala, Goa and Bangalore.

== Soundtrack ==
Thirutham

Soundtrack album by Pravin Mani
- Released: 1 August 2007
- Recorded: 2007
- Genre: Feature film soundtrack
- Length: 20:47
- Producer: Pravin Mani

Pravin Mani chronology
Perarasu (2006)	Thirutham (2007)	Iyakkam (2008)

The film score and the soundtrack were composed by Pravin Mani. The soundtrack features 5 tracks. Saraswathy Srinivas of Rediff.com rated the album 2 out of 5 stars and wrote, "Not many brownie points for Thirutham music. An average fare".

Track listing
No.	Title	Lyrics	Singer(s)	Length
1.	"Paadhai Therigiradhu"	Sivakasi Sridhar	Tippu	4:37
2.	"Badava Kaiya Pudida"	Sivakasi Sridhar	Jassie Gift, Anuradha Sriram	4:12
3.	"Labam Yogam"	Sivakasi Sridhar	Karthik	4:05
4.	"Kadhal Kanmaniye"	Sivakasi Sridhar	Unni Menon, K. S. Chithra	4:06
5.	"Sidumoonji Dhevadhaiye"	Yugabharathi	Srinivas, Kalyani	3:47
Total length:				20:47

== Release and reception ==
The film was released on 14 September 2007 alongside five other films.

A critic from Koodal lauded the lead pair's acting and criticised the film's screenplay. Cinefundas wrote, "Hari does go through most of the roles with easy assurance" and called the film "below average". He also noted that the film had similarities with Naan Avan Illai (2007), Manmadhan (2004) and Kalyanaraman (1979). Malini Mannath of Chennai Online made similar comments. Revathi of Kalki felt the director should have revised the screenplay and could have focused more on strong visuals, deep dialogues. S. R. Ashok Kumar of The Hindu wrote "Director Ponraman, who is also in charge of the story, screenplay and dialogue, begins on the lines of Nan Avan Illai but changes track. The screenplay kindles interest, but fails to sustain it".
