= Scissor Manohar =

Indian comedian and actor

- Born: M. Palanisamy
- Occupation: Actor
- Years active: 1991–present

Scissor Manohar is an Indian comedian and actor who works in Tamil-language films.

== Career ==
Manohar began to work as a production assistant working on films such as Puthiya Vaarpugal (1979). Manohar earned the name Scissor for his character in Gokulathil Seethai (1996). In the film, he introduces himself as 'Scissor Manohar' when Suvalakshmi and Karan are talking. He has since become a comedian and has acted in over 240 Tamil language films. He played notable roles in the films Vindhai (2015) and Kadikara Manithargal (2018).

== Filmography ==
- All films are in Tamil, unless otherwise noted.

Key
†	Denotes films that have not yet been released

Year	Film	Role	Notes
1991	En Rasavin Manasile	Mokkasami	
1995	Ellame En Rasathan		
1996	Gokulathil Seethai	Scissor Manohar	
1997	Porkkaalam		
1998	Thulli Thirintha Kaalam		
1998	Desiya Geetham	Rathnam	
1999	Thullatha Manamum Thullum	Man travelling to Ice House	
1999	Kallazhagar		
1999	Padayappa		
1999	Poomagal Oorvalam	Sakthi's friend	
1999	Suyamvaram	Potential groom	
1999	Malabar Police		
1999	Anbulla Kadhalukku		
1999	Mudhalvan	Bus Conductor	
1999	Kannupada Poguthaiya	Villager	
2000	James Pandu	Railway porter	
2000	Kannukku Kannaga		
2000	Ennavalle		
2001	Love Channel		
2001	Star	Thief	
2001	12B	Auto driver	
2001	Shahjahan	College peon	
2001	Thavasi	Servant	
2002	Red	Auto driver	Uncredited
2002	H2O	Chennoor villager	Kannada film; uncredited
2002	Ezhumalai		
2002	Panchatanthiram	Auto driver	
2002	Villain	Police officer	
2002	Bala	Bus conductor	
2002	Style		
2003	Vaseegara	Ticket collector	Uncredited
2003	Yes Madam		
2003	Military	Barber	
2003	Dum	Police constable	
2003	Anbe Anbe	Beggar	
2003	Thiruda Thirudi	Traffic inspector	
2003	Anjaneya	Minister's assistant	
2004	Vasool Raja MBBS	Coconut seller	
2004	Attahasam		
2004	Aai	Pickpocket	
2005	Thirupaachi		
2005	Aadhikkam		
2005	Selvam		
2005	Oru Naal Oru Kanavu	Broker	
2005	Sivakasi	Muthappa's childhood friend	
2005	Veeranna		
2006	Madrasi	Mahabu Bhai	
2006	Theenda Theenda	Thar Road	
2006	Imsai Arasan 23rd Pulikecei	Palace guard	
2006	Varalaru	Waiter	
2006	E		
2007	Aalwar		
2007	Pokkiri	Colony member	
2007	Muni	House broker	
2007	Sabari	Party member	
2007	Kasu Irukkanum		
2007	Thiru Ranga		
2007	Thee Nagar		
2007	Thottal Poo Malarum	Kabaaleeswaran's friend	
2007	18 Vayasu Puyale	Doctor	
2007	Manase Mounama		
2007	Nam Naadu		
2007	Kelvikuri	Ganja Samy	
2008	Pattaya Kelappu	Postman	
2008	Iyakkam		
2008	Kaalaippani		
2008	Satyam	Politician's PA	
2008	Kodaikanal	Police constable	
2009	Aadatha Aattamellam	Ganesan, Dhandayuthapani, Balasubramaniam	
2009	Thoranai	Man who asks for lift	
2009	Oliyum Oliyum	Mookuthi, Pannari	
2009	Kannukulle	Bus passenger	
2010	Theeradha Vilaiyattu Pillai	Ambulance driver	
2010	Padagasalai	Sudalai	
2010	Sivappu Mazhai		
2010	Pa. Ra. Palanisamy	Nagarajan	
2010	Aaravadhu Vanam	Krish	
2010	Vaada	Ward boy	
2010	Aarvam	Sathya's uncle	
2010	Agam Puram	Police constable	
2011	Gurusamy	A kid's father	
2011	Vazhividu Kanney Vazhividu		
2013	Kantha		
2013	Thirumathi Thamizh		
2013	Singam II	Saghayam's sidekick	
2013	Summa Nachunu Irukku		
2014	Oru Kanniyum Moonu Kalavaanikalum	Suddalai	
2014	Tenaliraman	Beggar	Uncredited role
2014	Aindhaam Thalaimurai Sidha Vaidhiya Sigamani	Police constable	
2014	Jaihind 2 / Abhimanyu		Trilingual film
2014	Mosakutty		
2014	Azhagiya Pandipuram		
2014	Lingaa	Police Constable	
2015	Rombha Nallavan Da Nee		
2015	36 Vayadhinile	Auto Driver	
2015	Vindhai		
2015	Adhibar		
2015	Savaale Samaali		
2015	Athiradi		
2016	Adida Melam		
2016	Narathan		
2016	Paravathipuram	Dirty Guest House owner	Telugu film
2016	Mudinja Ivana Pudi	Shop owner	Bilingual film
2016	Ner Mugam		
2016	Andaman		
2017	Pagadi Aattam	Police constable	
2017	Aangila Padam	Rail Murugan's henchman	
2018	Pakka	Deaf man	
2018	Kadikara Manithargal	Broker	
2018	Vinai Ariyar		
2019	Charlie Chaplin 2	Bullet Pushparaj's assistant	
2019	Pottu		
2019	Vilambaram		
2019	Thirupathisamy Kudumbam		
2020	Alti		
2020	Kanni Raasi	Ramadoss	
2022	Nanbaa		
2023	Kodai	Pazhani	
2023	Kabadi Bro		
2023	Pudhu Vedham		
2024	Haraa		
2024	Dhil Raja		
2024	Iravin Vizhigal		
2025	Otha Votu Muthaiya	Broker Narayana	
2025	Iravin Vizhigal		
