= Thirumagan =

- DVD cover
- Directed by: M. Rathnakumar
- Written by: M. Rathnakumar
- Produced by: Kalaipuli S. Thanu
- Starring: S. J. Suryah; Meera Jasmine; Malavika; Lakshana; Preethi Varma
- Cinematography: Venu
- Edited by: Anthony
- Music by: Deva
- Distributed by: V Creations
- Release date: 9 March 2007
- Running time: 136 minutes
- Country: India
- Language: Tamil

Thirumagan is a 2007 Indian Tamil-language drama film directed by M. Rathnakumar. The film stars S. J. Suryah, Meera Jasmine, Malavika, Lakshana and Preethi Varma. Vijayakumar, Radha Ravi, Ranjith, Saranya Ponvannan, and Manivannan play supporting roles. The music was composed by Deva with editing by Anthony and cinematography by Venu. The film was shot completely in Tirunelveli and is a village story based on the relationships between a father and son. The film released on 9 March 2007.

== Plot ==
Thangapaandi (S.J. Suryah) is the son of Malaiswamy (Vijayakumar), who is financially mediocre but well-respected and loved in the Tirunelveli village. Thangapaandi, however, is immature and spends his time gallivanting about the village and dancing at temple functions, while failing his +2 examinations with regularity every year.

His niece Rasathi (Preethi Varma) is in love with him, as their parents have informally promised them to each other from childhood itself. However, Thangapaandi pursues his own agenda and falls for loudmouthed orphan girl Ayyakka (Meera Jasmine), who makes and sells pots for a living.

Thangapaandi, despite his lack of a regular job or prospects, appears to be the most sought after bachelor in the village. In the midst of this love 'square', the elders add their own two cents of interference, causing more chaos. How Thangapaandi and his ladies deal with this is the fodder for the rest of the film.

== Cast ==
- S. J. Suryah as Thangapaandi
- Meera Jasmine as Ayyakka
- Malavika as Myna
- Lakshana as Vairasilai
- Preethi Varma as Rasathi
- Vijayakumar as Malaiswamy
- Radha Ravi as Sivalingam
- Ranjith as Sivankaalai
- Manivannan as Reddiar
- Saranya Ponvannan as Jayakodi
- Ilavarasu as Thavasi
- Charle as Ondipuli
- Ganja Karuppu
- Periya Karuppu Thevar
- Karthika
- Kavitha
- Anjali Devi

== Production ==
Rathnakumar, who directed Senathipathi with Sathyaraj, announced in 2005 that S. J. Suryah would act in his film titled Thirumagan. During the shooting, Suryah had a misunderstanding with Rathnakumar, and many of the crew claimed that they felt difficult to work with the director.

== Soundtrack ==
The music was composed by Deva, with lyrics written by Vairamuthu.

Song	Singers
Poranthathu	Deva, Tippu
Shock Adikkuthu	KK, Anuradha Sriram
Thatti Thatti	Naresh Iyer, Madhushree
Idhukuthana	Naresh Iyer, Madhushree
Koora Sela	Swarnalatha
Thirumagane	Sadhana Sargam

== Reception ==
Shwetha Bhaskar Rediff wrote "Director Ratnakumar has made so many twists to the formula, and added so many dimensions to the characters, that the movie ultimately comes across as a hotchpotch, but with bursts of freshness here and there". Lajjavathi of Kalki praised the acting of Suryah, Meera Jasmine and other actors, Venu's cinematography but panned the vulgarity and double meaning dialogues and concluded saying since director has assisted Bharathiraja, he has given a village centric film which is fine but he should have made it into a quality film, he should have concentrated more on screenplay and other aspects and totally messed up. Malini Mannath of Chennai Online wrote "Finally, what's surprising is that whether it's Surya who directs himself ('New', 'Anbe Aaruyire', or Surya who is directed by another director 'Kalvanin Kadhali', 'Thirumagan'), the style and feel of the film, and his own demeanour and performance, are all uncannily similar. It just totally puts you off!". Sify wrote "There is nothing new in the plot of Thirumahan, it has been played out in many village milieu films of the past. But here the melodrama and mush is limited as the screenplay moves fast in the first half, giving you enough reason to smile".
