= Poova Thalaiya (2011 film) =

2011 film by Sanjay Ram

- Directed by: Sanjay Ram
- Written by: Sanjay Ram
- Produced by: Sanjay Ram
- Starring: Krishnakumar; Udhaya; Vaali; Sherin Shringar; Megha Nair
- Edited by: S. Surajkavee
- Music by: Sahitya
- Production company: Lingam Theatres
- Release date: 29 April 2011
- Country: India
- Language: Tamil

Poova Thalaiya (transl. Heads or Tails) is a 2011 Indian Tamil-language action film produced, written and directed by Sanjay Ram. The film stars Krishnakumar, Udhaya, Vaali, Sherin Shringar and Megha Nair. The film was theatrically released in India on 29 April 2011.

== Cast ==
- Krishnakumar
- Udhaya as Koduva
- Vaali
- Sherin Shringar as Eashwari
- Megha Nair as Rekha
- Swetha
- Deepan Chakravarthy
- Kadhal Dhandapani
- Alex
- Chaplin Balu
- Raviprakash as Eashwari's father

== Production ==
The film features a family man and a ruffian, played by Udhaya. Megha Nair played his love interest. In August 2008, the film was ready to be released by 15 August, but the project was subsequently delayed.

The film went through a change of producer with Sanjay Ram replacing Balu Poththan and Ram Prakash. Prior to the release of the film, Sherin lodged a complaint with the Nadigar Sangam stating that she had not finished shooting for her parts in the film and that the director was trying to release a film with a different script to the original pitched to her. She suggested that the producer Sanjay Ram had "played dirty" and the team were releasing the film without paying her acting fee.

== Release ==
The film subsequently had a low key release on 29 April 2011 and went unnoticed at the box office.
