= Udhaya (actor) =

Indian film actor

- Occupation: Actor
- Years active: 1998-present
- Parent: A. L. Azhagappan (father)
- Relatives: A. L. Vijay (brother)

Udhaya is an Indian actor who has acted in Tamil language films. He is the son of noted producer A. L. Azhagappan and the brother of director A. L. Vijay.

== Personal life ==
Udhaya got married in August 2007 to Keerthika.

== Career ==
Udhaya began his acting career in 1998 under his original name of Senthilkumar, by appearing in Ini Ellam Sugame (1998) produced by his father. Udhaya then starred in Bharathi Kannan's Thirunelveli playing a lead role alongside Prabhu and Karan and being paired opposite Vindhya. The film won poor reviews. He was next seen opposite Vijayalakshmi in Kalakalappu, which also featured Napoleon and Jaya Seal. He also thereafter appeared in Shakalaka Baby, while another film titled Poonguyile, featuring him alongside Vindhya and Livingston, was shelved after several schedules.

In 2001, his father A. L. Azhagappan attempted to launch Udhaya as the main lead in a film titled Ennil Kalanthavalae, but the project did not develop. In 2004, the actor announced a project titled Asamy, and held a grand launch event, but the film failed to progress. During this period, he was also working on two projects which remain unreleased - the Prakash Raj-starrer Kaadhal Jaathi and Vinnaithaandi Varuvaayaa, with the latter being used as the title for an unrelated project in 2010 by Gautham Vasudev Menon. Vinnaithaandi Varuvaayaa was later released as Unnai Kann Theduthe in 2009, while in 2011, the actor hit out at Kaadhal Jaathi's director Kasthuri Raja, claiming that the director himself was blocking the release of the film.

Udhaya's 2011 venture Raa Raa won positive reviews, but went unnoticed at the box office, while his other release Poova Thalaiya, alongside Sherin also met with an average response. He later played a supporting role in his brother's Thalaivaa (2013), before working on the low-budget horror film Aavi Kumar.

== Filmography ==
=== Films ===
| Year | Title | Role | Notes |
|---|---|---|---|
| 1998 | Ini Ellam Sugame | | Uncredited role |
| 2000 | Thirunelveli | Satha | |
| 2001 | Kalakalappu | Karna | |
| 2002 | Shakalaka Baby | Udhay | Guest appearance |
| 2009 | Unnai Kann Theduthe | Rudhra | |
| 2011 | Poova Thalaiya | Koduva | |
| 2011 | Raa Raa | Bharathi | |
| 2013 | Thalaivaa | Video Kumar | |
| 2015 | Aavi Kumar | Kumar | |
| 2018 | Utharavu Maharaja | Ravi | Also producer |
| 2021 | Maanaadu | Mansoor | |
| 2025 | Accused | Kanakku | |
| 2025 | Paruthi | | |

=== Web series ===
| Year | Title | Role | Platform | Notes |
|---|---|---|---|---|
| 2020 | Singa Penne | Rayappa | ZEE5 | |
