= Santhoshi =

Indian film and television actress

- Born: Santhoshi Mohanraj
- Other names: Santoshi, Santhoshini
- Occupations: Film actress; television actress; beautician
- Years active: 1995-2017

Santhoshi is an Indian actress. She is best known for her performances in the films Bala, Jai and Honeymoon Express, and most prominently for her performance in the mainstream TV series Arasi. She won the Nandi Award for Best Female Comedian for her role in Nuvvostanante Nenoddantana.

== Career ==
Santhoshi was born to Gopala Krishna Moorthy and television actress Poornima in Chennai, India. She first appeared in a television series when she was eight years old, acting alongside her mother. She then debuted in the Tamil film Baba (2002), starring Rajinikanth, playing the sister of Manisha Koirala. Subsequently, she played supporting roles in several Tamil films: Aasai Aasaiyai (2002), Bala (2002), Maaran (2002) and Military (2003), before enacting lead female roles and foraying into other South Indian film industries as well. She played the second female lead in Samuthirakani's Unnai Charanadaindhen (2003) and played a starring role in Kadhal Samrajyam directed by National Film Award-winning director Agathiyan; the latter, however, remains unreleased. She made her debut in the Telugu film industry with the film Jai (2004) opposite Navdeep and debuted in Kannada in 2006 with the film Honeymoon Express. She also appeared in popular Telugu films such as Nuvvostanante Nenoddantana (2005) and Bangaram (2006), in supporting roles. Her performance in the former fetched her the Nandi Award for Best Female Comedian. From 2007, she appeared in the popular series Arasi, playing the role of Kalaiarasi, the daughter of the series' protagonist Arasi, portrayed by Radhika. She was crowned "Miss Chinnathirai 2007" at a beauty contest organized for television actresses.

== Filmography ==
Year	Film	Role	Language	Notes
2000	Penngal	Amudhavalli	Tamil	
2002	Baba	Rajeswari	Tamil	
2002	Maaran	Anjali	Tamil	
2002	Bala	Poornima	Tamil	
2003	Aasai Aasaiyai	Vinoth's Sister	Tamil	
2003	Military	Madhavan's half-sister	Tamil	
2003	Anbe Anbe	Ramya	Tamil	
2003	Unnai Saranadainthaen	Teja	Tamil	
2004	Jai	Farah	Telugu	
2005	Nuvvostanante Nenoddantana	Gowri	Telugu	Nandi Award for Best Female Comedian
2005	Okkade	Kanaka Durga	Telugu	
2006	Yuga	Meenu	Tamil	
2006	Bangaram	Bhooma Reddy's wife	Telugu	
2006	Honeymoon Express	Sowmya	Kannada	
2006	Tenali Rama	Prema	Kannada	
2007	Ninaithaley	Rupa's friend	Tamil	
2007	Dhee	Kumari	Telugu	
2007	Veerappu	Puli's sister	Tamil	
2009	Mariyadhai	Presenter	Tamil	
2010	Porkkalam	Karnan's mother	Tamil	
2019	Chennai 2 Bangkok		Tamil	

== Television ==
Year	Title	Role	Channel
2001–2002	Vaazhkai	Anjali	Sun TV
2002-2004	Rudhra Veenai	Dasi Aparajita Vaijayathi	Sun TV
2003	Anni	Rajeswari	Jaya TV
2006	Ammu	Bhavani	Star Vijay
2007-2009	Arasi	Kalaiarasi	Sun TV
2010-2014	Ilavarasi	Elavarasi	Sun TV
2010-2012	Pondaatti Thevai	Kausalya (Kausi)	Sun TV
2010-2011	Vadagai Veedu	Lavanya	Kalaignar TV
2011-2012	No. 23 Mahalakshmi Nivasam	Saravani	Gemini TV
2012-2013	Sooriya Puthiri	Thulasi	Kalaignar TV
2013	Illatharasi	Janaki	Captain TV
2014	Paava Mannippu	Sowmya	Zee Tamil
2014	Bhairavi Aavigalukku Priyamanaval	Special appearances	Sun TV
2015–2017	Maragatha Veenai	Divya	Sun TV
