= Mrs & Mr =

2025 Tamil film by Vanitha Vijayakumar

- Theatrical release poster
- Directed by: Vanitha Vijayakumar
- Written by: Vanitha Vijayakumar
- Produced by: Jovika Vijayakumar
- Starring: Vanitha Vijayakumar; Robert
- Cinematography: D. G. Kapil
- Edited by: Bala Guru
- Music by: Srikanth Deva
- Production company: Vanithaa Film Productions
- Distributed by: Blockbuster Productions
- Release date: 11 July 2025
- Running time: 141 minutes
- Country: India
- Language: Tamil

Mrs & Mr is a 2025 Indian Tamil-language adult comedy-drama film written and directed by Vanitha Vijayakumar in her directorial debut and produced by her daughter, Jovika. The film stars Vanitha and Robert alongside Shakeela, Aarthi Ganeshkar, Srinivasan, Ambika, Sriman and Ganeshkar. The music was composed by Srikanth Deva with cinematography by D. G. Kapil and editing by Bala Guru.

Mrs & Mr was released on 11 July 2025. It was heavily panned by critics and audiences alike, who criticized the screenplay, dialogues, visuals, and low budget. It emerged as a box office bomb.

== Plot ==
The film revolves around a modern wife Vidhya (Vanitha Vijayakumar), over 40 years old, grappling with the dilemma of whether to marry and have a child, and exploring the societal pressures and personal conflicts that come with such decisions, as well as how will her husband Arun (Robert) support her through her thoughts and decisions.

== Cast ==
- Vanitha Vijayakumar as Vidhya
- Robert as Arun, Vidhya's husband
- Shakeela as Shakila, Vidhya's mother
- Aarthi Ganeshkar as Riya, Vidhya's sister
- Srinivasan as Power
- Sriman as Bavaa
- Anu Mohan as Baava's father
- Swetha Bharathi as Sandhya
- Gumtaj as Cleaner
- Ganeshkar as Bang
- Fathima Babu as Bama
- Mohan Vaidya as Hot Uncle
- Chef Damu as Dhamu
- Ravikanth as Ravi, Vidhya's father
- VJ Shobana Lionel as Fertility Doctor
- Gayatri Rema as Delivery Doctor
- Vasuki as Baava's mother
- Sowmya Jayaram as Sowmya, Vidhya's friend
- Nanjil Vijayan as Drunk Trespasser
- Kiran Rathod as Rupini (special appearance in the song "Siva Rathiri")

== Production ==
=== Development ===
In October 2024, actress Vanitha Vijayakumar announced a post on her social media handles with her proposing to actor-choreographer Robert, indicating the couple were planning to get married. However, she later revealed the name of her film as Mrs and Mr and the post as an official poster for the film. The film was the brainchild of Vanitha and Robert, who were keen to make a romantic adult comedy film together after their first film together MGR Sivaji Rajini Kamal in 2015. Vanitha chose to produce the film for an old production studio, Vanitha Film Production, launched by her parents, Vijayakumar and Manjula in the 1980s. It subsequently became the studio's fourth film following Nenjangal (1982), Kai Kodukkum Kai (1984) and MGR Sivaji Rajini Kamal (2015). Vanitha made her directorial debut and cast herself in the film's lead role. Jovika Vijayakumar, Vanitha's daughter, chose to produce the film, making her debut as a producer. The film includes an ensemble cast including of Kiran Rathod (marking her comeback into the film industry after nine years), Shakeela, Aarthi Ganeshkar, Srinivasan, Ambika, Sriman, Ganeshkar, Fathima Babu, Chef Damu, and others in crucial roles.

== Controversy ==
Vanitha was charged a lawsuit by Ilaiyaraaja for using the song "Siva Rathiri" from the 1990 film Michael Madana Kama Rajan, which he composed. Ilaiyaraaja's legal team filed a case in the Chennai High Court seeking the removal of the song from the film, alleging that the song was used in the film without his permission and had been altered. Ilaiyaraaja stated in the petition that this is a copyright infringement and that the song should be immediately removed from the film. However, after the court case concluded Ilaiyaraaja's name was removed from all promotional material which was regarding the film.

Vanitha faced controversy over the film's censor board certificate rating which was rated "A" as the public had expected the film would be rated for family viewing. The public had misinterpreted the rating and deemed that the film was inappropriate for viewing however Vanitha clarified this by saying that although certain scenes in the film are suggestive in manner which led to the film being rated "A", the film does not have any vulgar or obscene scenes.

== Soundtrack ==
The soundtrack and score is composed by Srikanth Deva. The audio rights were acquired by Star Music India. The film features the original song "Siva Rathiri" from Michael Madana Kama Rajan (1990) which was composed by Ilaiyaraaja acquired through Sony Music South.

Mrs & Mr

Soundtrack album by Srikanth Deva
- Released: 13 June 2025
- Recorded: 2024
- Genre: Feature film soundtrack
- Producer: Srikanth Deva

Srikanth Deva chronology
Kaaduvetty (2024)	Mrs & Mr (2025)	Madharas Mafia Company (2025)

Track listing
No.	Title	Lyrics	Singer(s)	Length
1.	"Subha Muhurtham"	Rajhesh Vaidhya	Saindhavi	3:31
2.	"Un Kannai Kaana"	Srikanth Deva	Yugendran	3:27
3.	"Kaadhal Neeye"	Srikanth Deva	Lavanya Jayamohan	3:51
4.	"Bodha Kannu"	Srikanth Deva	Ajay Krishnaa, Punya Selva	3:54
5.	"40s Party"	Srikanth Deva	Gana Guna	3:25
6.	"Siva Rathiri"	Vaalee	Mano, K. S. Chithra	5:04
Total length:				23:12

== Release ==
Mrs & Mr released worldwide on 11 July 2025.

The film released digitally on Vanitha's YouTube channel and Facebook page on 18 August.

== Critical reception ==
Abhinav Subramanian of Times Of India gave 1.5/5 stars and wrote "Vanitha Vijayakumar wears multiple hats for her directorial debut–writer, director, producer, and lead actor–but perhaps should have delegated a few. [...] The adult comedy tag apparently meant throwing in crude jokes that land with a thud rather than exploring mature themes with any real insight. The characters don't feel like actual people–they're just walking, talking plot devices spouting dialogue that makes you cringe. Every interaction grates, every comedic beat falls flat, and you're left wondering how a potentially meaningful story got buried under such sloppy execution."
