= Naalaiya Pozhuthum Unnodu =

- Directed by: K. Moorthy Kannan
- Written by: K. Moorthy Kannan
- Produced by: P. R. Suresh Kumar
- Starring: Prithvi Rajan; Karthika
- Cinematography: H. S. Dineshraj
- Edited by: R. Selvaraj
- Music by: Srikanth Deva
- Production company: PRK Films
- Release date: 12 October 2007
- Running time: 140 minutes
- Country: India
- Language: Tamil

Naalaiya Pozhuthum Unnodu (transl. Tomorrow entirely with you) is a 2007 Indian Tamil-language romantic drama film directed by K. Moorthy Kannan. The film stars Prithvi Rajan and Karthika, with Velu Prabhakaran, Rohini, J. Livingston, Venu Arvind, Sugi, Kathaka Thirumavalavan, Gowri and Kovai Guna playing supporting roles. The film was released on 12 October 2007.

== Plot ==
The film begins with the popular writer Jayavarman attending a function in honour of him. In the mid of the function, he tells that he has important work and leaves the function in a hurry. He then meets an old woman in her house and narrates her a story.

In a village near Mayiladuthurai, the teenagers Sakthi and Nangai have been friends since childhood and they eventually fall in love with each other. Sakthi is the son of the honest village administrative officer while Nangai is the daughter of the village president (Gowri) who is fanatical about her caste and her family honour. When Nangai's mother learns of their affair, she forces Nangai to forget her lover Sakthi but Nangai continues to secretly meet him. After being threatened by Nangai's father, Shakti and his parents are forced to leave the village. They start living with Shakti's uncle (Venu Arvind) who is a press reporter in the city. Sakthi cannot forget her so he secretly returns to his native village and learns that Nangai has married and lives in Singapore. A heartbroken Sakthi returns to the city. He then befriends the modern city woman Priya who has a tragic past. One day, Sakthi and Priya take a pregnant woman who is also mentally ill to the hospital and they discover that mentally ill women are raped in a mental asylum. One night, Sakthi and Priya sneak into the mental asylum to take photos of the crime committed by the wardens. Sakthi saves a mentally ill woman from the wardens and she is none other than his lover Nangai. A few months ago, Nangai's mother mixed poison in her milk to kill her for bringing shame to the family but Nangai survived and became mentally ill. Thereafter, her parents put her in a mental asylum in the city.

Back to the present, Jayavarman turns out to be Sakthi and the old woman is none other than his lover Nangai. After finding her in the mental asylum, Sakthi took her with him and he took care of her in his house. Every day, Nangai asks him to tell a story and Sakthi narrates her one. Thereafter, Sakthi wrote novels under the pseudonym of Jayavarman and became a popular writer. The film ends with Sakthi and Nangai hugging each other.

== Cast ==
- Prithvi as Sakthi
- Karthika as Nangai
- Velu Prabhakaran as Jayavarman/Old Sakthi
- Rohini as Old Nangai
- J. Livingston as Sakthi's father
- Venu Arvind as Sakthi's uncle
- Sugi as Priya
- Kathaka Thirumavalavan as Nangai's father
- Gowri as Nangai's mother
- Kovai Guna as Gajapathi, Nangai's uncle
- Venba as Young Nangai

== Production ==
K. Moorthy Kannan who worked as an assistant director to P. Vasu made his directorial debut with Naalaiya Pozhuthum Unnodu under the banner of PRK Films. After making his acting debut in Kaivantha Kalai (2006) which was directed by his father Pandiarajan, Prithvi Rajan was cast to play the hero for the second time. Karthika was selected to play his love interest. Speaking about the film, Prithvi Rajan said, "The film is a teenage love story and has enough scope for me to prove my acting credentials. It is a simple love story but narrated with a difference".

== Soundtrack ==
Naalaiya Pozhuthum Unnodu

Soundtrack album by Srikanth Deva
- Released: 4 October 2007
- Recorded: 2007
- Genre: Feature film soundtrack
- Length: 29:02
- Producer: Srikanth Deva

Srikanth Deva chronology
Vijayadasami (2007)	Naalaiya Pozhuthum Unnodu (2007)	Puli Varudhu (2007)

The film score and the soundtrack were composed by Srikanth Deva. The soundtrack features 7 tracks.

Tracklist
No.	Title	Lyrics	Singer(s)	Length
1.	"Karuvakaadu"	Yugabharathi	Jassie Gift	3:39
2.	"Oru Kodam"	Yugabharathi	Renuka	1:19
3.	"Pesa Paraasa"	Kabilan	Karthik, Bhavatharini	5:28
4.	"Poovenbatha"	K. Moorthy Kannan	Senthildass Velayutham, Srimathumitha	5:34
5.	"Sollamaley"	Kabilan	Sathyan, Priya	4:44
6.	"Yaarukitta"	Yugabharathi	Jaidev, Surmukhi Raman	5:13
7.	"Theme Music"			3:05
Total length:				29:02

== Reception ==
A critic said, "As a whole analyzing the film, it’s a good film, but the same wine in different bottle. Many films focusing on the love that blooms between a boy and girl during adolescent age have already hit the screens and the only difference here is Karthiga’s characterization". A reviewer called it "watchable" despite the clichéd narration and praised the film's ending. Another critic wrote, "Naalaiya.. is an effort worth appreciating by first-time director Moorthy Kannan. Like many of the recent debutant film-makers, the director has made an effort to bring in some variation and novelty within an otherwise predictable scenario". Uma of Kalki wrote despite having good acting, the predictable scenes are the drawback and noted it would have been better if the screenplay was strong and also felt despite climax being powerful, the film lags behind due to old treatment.
