= Vanitha Vijayakumar =

Indian actress (born 1980)

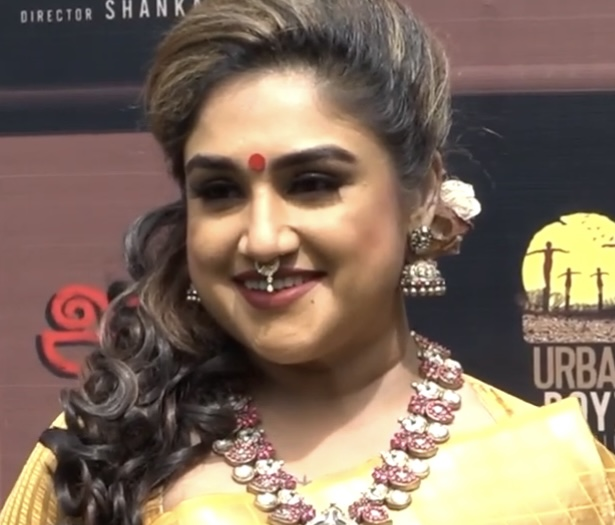
- Vanitha in 2023
- Born: 5 October 1980 (age 46); Mannargudi, Thanjavur, Tamil Nadu, India
- Occupations: Actress, director
- Years active: 1995–1999, 2013–present
- Spouses: Akash (m. 2000; div. 2005); Anand Jay Rajan (m. 2007; div. 2012)
- Children: 3
- Parents: Vijayakumar (father); Manjula Vijayakumar (mother)
- Relatives: Preetha Vijayakumar (sister); Sridevi Vijaykumar (sister); Arun Vijay (Half-brother)

Vanitha Vijayakumar (born 5 October 1980) is an Indian actress and film director who has appeared in Tamil films and television shows.

She has starred in several films, including Chandralekha (1995), Manikkam (1996), Hitler Brothers (1997), Devi (1999), Naan Rajavaga Pogiren (2013), MGR Sivaji Rajini Kamal (2015), Malli Pelli (2023), Aneethi (2023), Andhagan (2024) and Mrs & Mr (2025).

== Early life ==
Vanitha was born on 5 October 1980 in Thanjavur district, Tamil Nadu, India. Vanitha is the eldest daughter of Tamil actor Vijayakumar and his second wife, Tamil actress Manjula. Vanitha has two younger sisters, Preetha and Sridevi, who were former actresses. From his first marriage to Muthukannu Vellalar, Vijayakumar had three children: actor Arun Vijay, Anitha and Kavitha.

In September 2018, she had a public fallout with her family after she refused to leave a family property that she had initially rented for a shoot in Ashtalakshmi Nagar. Her father, Vijayakumar, subsequently filed a police complaint against her.

== Career ==
=== Debut in Tamil and Malayalam cinema (1995–1999) ===
Vanitha made her acting debut opposite Vijay in Chandralekha (1995). Vanitha subsequently appeared alongside Rajkiran in Manikkam (1996), before moving on to act in the Malayalam film Hitler Brothers (1997) and Telugu devotional fantasy film Devi (1999). After her first marriage to Akash, Vanitha quit the film industry.

=== Reentry into cinema (2013–2015) ===
Vanitha made a brief comeback to acting in the mid-2010s, and first appeared in a small role in Naan Rajavaga Pogiren (2013). She followed this up with a longer role in the comedy drama, Summa Nachunu Irukku (2013). Vanitha then chose to turn producer and make a film titled MGR Sivaji Rajini Kamal (2015), to be directed by her then-boyfriend Robert. She produced the film under the Vanitha Film Production banner, suggesting that the script of the film originated from a joke they discussed at a social gathering. Following the commercial failure of the film, Vanitha lodged a police complaint against distribution studio Vibrant Medias, alleging that they did not release the film in 80 cinemas as agreed in their contract. She was also rejected by most directors and didn't receive any film offers from directors, and she decided to quit acting for some time due to criticisms.

=== Recognition in Tamil television (2019–present) ===
On 2019, Vanitha appeared in the Tamil reality television show Bigg Boss Tamil 3 on Star Vijay. She was the second contestant to be eliminated from the show. After a few weeks, Vanitha entered the house as a wild card.

In 2020, Vanitha appeared on season 1 of the Tamil Cooking show Cooku with Comali on Star Vijay and became the winner.

She also later participated in the spin-off version show called Bigg Boss Ultimate (season 1) as a contestant.

She made a cameo appearance in the Zee Tamil soap opera Pudhu Pudhu Arthangal, playing a small role in the serial.

== Personal life ==
Vanitha Vijayakumar married actor Akash on 10 September 2000. Their son was born in 2001 and their daughter in 2005. The marriage ended in divorce in 2005. Following a lengthy custody dispute, the Madras High Court ordered that the children split their time between both parents. Her son later moved in permanently with his grandfather and then with his father Akash.

In 2007, Vanitha married businessman Anand Jay Rajan. The couple has a daughter. They separated soon after and were officially divorced in 2012, with Rajan being awarded custody of their child. Vanitha suggested that the pair divorced as a result of her disputes with Vijayakumar, and that Rajan had effectively become indirectly involved in the controversy costing her peace and career opportunities.

Following her separation with Anand Rajan in 2010, Vanitha dated choreographer Robert beginning in 2013. The duo also worked together professionally by producing a film titled MGR Sivaji Rajini Kamal (2015), before ending their relationship in 2017. However, they reunited in 2024.

Vanitha was born to Hindu Tamil parents. On 30 March 2022 she converted to Buddhism following various religious rituals.

Vanitha has mentioned that she had been suffering from depression for more than 10 years and that she later underwent medical treatment and professional counselling to recover fully.

In 2019, the police questioned Vanitha while she was on Bigg Boss Tamil 3 in Chennai over a complaint filed by Rajan alleging that she had kidnapped their daughter.

In 2020, she revealed that she was in a relationship with Peter Paul, a photographer who was already married and a father of two children. The couple got married on 27 June 2020 in Chennai. Vanitha's marital relationship created a lot of hype in the media. Peter's first wife, Elizabeth, filed a case against Vanitha and her husband and for not getting an official divorce before marrying again. As of October 2020, Vanitha denied Peter to be named as her husband as their marriage ceremony was not yet registered and broke up the relationship with him due to his ongoing addiction to alcohol.

== Off-screen work ==
In 2021, Vanitha officially opened her own clothing store outlet, Vanitha Vijayakumar Styling, located in Chennai. She is also a part time costume designer.

== Filmography ==
Key
†	Denotes films that have not yet been released

List of Vanitha Vijayakumar film credits
Year	Title	Role	Language	Notes
1995	Chandralekha	Chandra	Tamil	
1996	Manikkam	Savithri	Tamil	
1997	Hitler Brothers	Nandini	Malayalam	
1999	Devi	Susheela	Telugu	
2013	Naan Rajavaga Pogiren	Diana	Tamil	
2013	Summa Nachunu Irukku	Kavitha	Tamil	
2015	MGR Sivaji Rajini Kamal	Ayana	Tamil	also producer and writer
2023	Malli Pelli	Soumya Sethupathi	Telugu	
2023	Aneethi	Anitha	Tamil	
2023	Dhillu Irundha Poradu		Tamil	
2024	Operation Laila	Police inspector	Tamil	
2024	Haraa	Minister	Tamil	
2024	Dandupalayam	Radhika	Tamil	Tamil version
2024	Andhagan	Lalitha	Tamil	
2024	Dhil Raja		Tamil	
2025	Kadaisi Thotta	Santhana Lakshmi	Tamil	
2025	Mrs & Mr	Vidhya Arun	Tamil	Lead role also director
2026	Love Oh Love	Lekha	Tamil	
2026	Agadha	Sushila	Telugu	

== Television ==
Fiction

List of Vanitha Vijayakumar television fiction credits
Year	Title	Role	Channel	Language	Notes
1999	Galata Sirippu			Tamil	Galatta Kudumbam, season 2, by AVM
2000	Chinna Papa Periya Papa	Vasuki (Periya Papa)	Sun TV	Tamil	
2019	Chandralekha	Herself	Sun TV	Tamil	Cameo appearance
2021	Thirumathi Hitler	Rajeshwari (Rajee) and Cooking Reality show judge	Zee Tamil	Tamil	Dual cameo appearance
2022	Pudhu Pudhu Arthangal	Herself	Zee Tamil	Tamil	Cameo appearance
2022, 2023	Maari	Sakunthala	Zee Tamil	Tamil	Extended cameo appearance
2023	Karthigai Deepam	Chamundeshwari	Zee Tamil	Tamil	Cameo appearance
2025	Idhayam	Saroja	Zee Tamil	Tamil	Cameo appearance
2025	Sandhya Raagam	Vasundara Devi	Zee Tamil	Tamil	Cameo appearance

Non-fiction

List of Vanitha Vijayakumar television non-fiction credits
Year	Title	Role	Channel	Language	Notes
2007	Sunday Samayal	"Microwave Cooking" Segment Host	Sun TV	Tamil	
2011	Sakthi Kodu	Host	Polimer TV	Tamil	
2014	Stars Day Out	Guest	Puthuyugam TV	Tamil	
2019	Bigg Boss Tamil 3	Contestant	Star Vijay	Tamil	Evicted Day 21, re-entrant Day 50, re-evicted Day 84
2019	Bigg Boss 3 Kondattam	Contestant	Star Vijay	Tamil	Special show
2019–2020	Cooku With Comali (season 1)	Contestant	Star Vijay	Tamil	Winner
2020	Kalakka Povathu Yaaru	Judge	Star Vijay	Tamil	
2020	Start Music	Contestant	Star Vijay	Tamil	1st runner-up
2020	Nammavar Kamal	Guest	Star Vijay	Tamil	
2020	Vanakkam Tamizha	Guest	Sun TV	Tamil	
2020	Bigg Boss 4	Guest	Star Vijay	Tamil	For special tasks
2021	Cooku With Comali (season 2)	Guest	Star Vijay	Tamil	Celebration episode
2021	Genes (season 3)	Participant	Zee Tamil	Tamil	
2021	Kanni Theevu	Guest	Colors Tamil	Tamil	
2021	BB Jodigal	Contestant	Star Vijay	Tamil	Paired with Suresh Chakravarthy; Left the show
2021	Alitho Saradaga	Guest	ETV	Telugu	Episode 240
2022	Jabardasth	Artist	ETV	Telugu	Comedy TV show
2022	Bigg Boss Ultimate 1	Contestant	Disney+ Hotstar	Tamil	Walked Day 24
2022	Joker Poker	Participant	Zee Tamil	Tamil	Comedy TV show
2022	Vanitha Veetla Vishesham	Guest	Kalaignar TV	Tamil	
2022	Oo Solriya Oo Oohm Solriya	Participant	Star Vijay	Tamil	Winner
2023	Anda Ka Kasam	Participant	Star Vijay	Tamil	Game show
2023	Tamizha Tamizha	Herself	Zee Tamil	Tamil	Talk show
