= Kabilan (lyricist) =

Indian lyricist, poet and actor

- Born: 16 May 1977 (age 49); Pondicherry, India
- Occupations: Lyricist, poet
- Years active: 2001-present
- Awards: Vijay Award for Best Lyricist, Tamil Nadu State Film Award for Best Lyricist (2003) and Mirchi Music Awards South

Kabilan (born 16 May 1977) is an Indian lyricist, poet and actor who predominantly works in Tamil cinema. Born in the Indian coastal city of Pondicherry, he started writing lyrics for films and television in the early 2000s and gradually moved to acting as well. He won the Vijay Award for Best Lyricist for the song "Aaathangara Orathil" from Yaan (2014), Composed by Harris Jayaraj. He had mostly collaborated with Composer Vidyasagar followed by Srikanth Deva. He had penned super hit songs for Ilayaraaja and A. R. Rahman. Kabilan is known for his mass introduction songs, among which maximum hits are for Vijay.

== Filmography ==
=== As a Lyricist ===
| Year | Film | Song(s) | Music composer | Notes |
|---|---|---|---|---|
| 2001 | Dhill | "Un Samayal Aaraiyil" | Vidyasagar | |
| 2001 | Narasimha | "Innoru Desiya Geetham", "Lala Nandalala" | Mani Sharma | |
| 2001 | Alli Thandha Vaanam | "Chenna Pattanam" | Vidyasagar | |
| 2001 | Thavasi | "Ethanai Ethanai" | Vidyasagar | |
| 2002 | Pammal K. Sambandam | "Sakalakala Vallavane" | Deva | |
| 2002 | Vivaramana Aalu | "Eeccha Eechambazham" | Deva | |
| 2002 | Charlie Chaplin | 'Vaarthai Thavari Ponathanaley" | Bharani | |
| 2002 | Pesadha Kannum Pesume | "Udhadugal" | Bharani | |
| 2002 | Youth | "Aal Thotta Boopathy" | Mani Sharma | |
| 2002 | Ivan | "Mele Toppula" | Ilayaraaja | |
| 2002 | Album | "Pillai Thamarai" | Karthik Raja | |
| 2002 | Jaya | "Berla Berla" | Bharani | |
| 2002 | Bala | "Vannathi Poochi" | Yuvan Shankar Raja | |
| 2003 | Dhool | "Aasai Aasai" | Vidyasagar | |
| 2003 | Student Number 1 | "Engeyo Thondri", "Kadhal Thozhi" | M. M. Keeravani | |
| 2003 | Pavalakkodi | "Kannaal Paarthathum" | Sirpi | |
| 2003 | Dum | "Kannamma Kannamma" | Deva | |
| 2003 | Arasu | "Aalaana Dhegam Engum", "Kattha Kattha", "Malligai Malligai" | Mani Sharma | |
| 2003 | Anbe Anbe | "Rooba Noottil" | Bharadwaj | |
| 2003 | Parthiban Kanavu | "Aalanguyil Koovum Rayyil" | Vidyasagar | |
| 2003 | Parasuram | "Kadhal Vettukili" & "Muppadhu Nimidam" | Songs by A. R. Rahman and Background score by Pravin Mani | |
| 2003 | Ice | "En Vanathin" | Devi Sri Prasad | |
| 2003 | Whistle | "Kirukka Kadhal Kirukka" | D. Imman | |
| 2003 | Aahaa Ethanai Azhagu | "Kannu Rendum" | Vidyasagar | |
| 2003 | Kadhal Kisu Kisu | "Kadhal Arimugama" | Vidyasagar | |
| 2003 | Eera Nilam | "Hey Sembaruthi" | Sirpi | |
| 2003 | Boys | "Ale Ale" | A. R. Rahman | |
| 2003 | Success | "Kanna Un" | Deva | |
| 2003 | Alai | "Alai Adikkuthu" | Vidyasagar | |
| 2003 | Aalukkoru Aasai | "Belpoori Naan" | S.A. Rajkumar | |
| 2003 | Anjaneya | "Ovvoru Naalum", "Agap Porula", "Paavadai Panjavarnam" | Mani Sharma | |
| 2003 | Thirumalai | "Vaadiyamma Jakkamma" | Vidyasagar | |
| 2003 | Anbe Un Vasam | "Yengaavathu" | Dhina | |
| 2003 | Kadhal Kirukkan | "Poove Mudhal Poove" | Deva | |
| 2003 | Joot | "Azhagiya Koonthal" | Vidyasagar | |
| 2003 | Thathi Thavadhu Manasu | "Kudukuduppai" | Deva | |
| 2004 | Gambeeram | "Naanaga Naan", "Oru Chinna Vennila" | Mani Sharma | |
| 2004 | Ghilli | "Arjunar Villu" | Vidyasagar | |
| 2004 | Aethirree | "Thamizhnaatu Pennai" | Yuvan Shankar Raja | |
| 2004 | Perazhagan | "Kadhalukku" | Yuvan Shankar Raja | |
| 2004 | Jana | "Oru Vanamai" | Dhina | |
| 2004 | Jore | "Un Uthattukku" | Deva | |
| 2004 | Sullan | "Yaaro Nee" | Vidyasagar | |
| 2004 | Madhurey | "Machhan Peru Madhurey" | Vidyasagar | |
| 2004 | Gajendra | "Gaja Varanda" | Deva | |
| 2004 | M. Kumaran S/O Mahalakshmi | "Yaaru Yaaru Ivano" | Srikanth Deva | |
| 2004 | Kangalal Kaidhu Sei | "Aha Tamizhamma" & "Azhakiya Cindrella" | A. R. Rahman | |
| 2005 | Ji | "Vamba Velaikku" | Vidyasagar | |
| 2005 | Sukran | "Vaanamthan" | Songs by Vijay Antony and Score by Pravin Mani | |
| 2005 | Ulla Kadathal | "Pattaam Pattaam Poochigal" | Bharadwaj | |
| 2005 | Maayavi | "Tamizh Naatil" | Devi Sri Prasad | |
| 2005 | Chandramukhi | "Annanoda Paattu" | Vidyasagar | |
| 2005 | Sachein | "Gundu Manga Thoppukulle" | Devi Sri Prasad | |
| 2005 | Jithan | "Kadhaliye", "Ah Mudhal Akku Thaanada" | Srikanth Deva | |
| 2005 | Anniyan | "Kannum Kannum" | Harris Jayaraj | |
| 2005 | Kaatrullavarai | "Aanvaasamum Pennvaasamum" | Bharani | |
| 2005 | February 14 | "Anantha Avasthai" | Bharadwaj | |
| 2005 | Thotti Jaya | "Yaari Singari" | Harris Jayaraj | |
| 2005 | Chanakya | "Romba Azhagu", "Tharuviya Tharamatiya" | Srikanth Deva | |
| 2005 | Ghajini | "Rangola" | Harris Jayaraj | |
| 2005 | Ambuttu Imbuttu Embuttu | "Anjukkum Pathukkum" | Dhina | |
| 2005 | Majaa | "Solli Tharava" | Vidyasagar | |
| 2005 | Bambara Kannaley | All Songs | Srikanth Deva | |
| 2006 | Saravana | "Kadhal Sutthudhe" | Srikanth Deva | |
| 2006 | Chithiram Pesuthadi | "Idam Poral Parthu", "Pattam Poochi" | Sundar C Babu | |
| 2006 | Kokki | "Yelo Yelo Kadhal" | Dhina | |
| 2006 | Unakkum Enakkum | "Unn Paarvaiyil" | Devi Sri Prasad | |
| 2006 | Nee Venunda Chellam | "Kannanai" | Dhina | |
| 2006 | Em Magan | "Varaaru Vaararu" | Vidyasagar | |
| 2006 | Jambhavan | "Pen Alaiye", "Velan Vetrivelan" | Bharadwaj | |
| 2006 | Kedi | "Antha Vannam Pola" | Yuvan Shankar Raja | |
| 2006 | Poi | "Iyakkunare" | Vidyasagar | |
| 2006 | Boys and Girls | All Songs | | |
| 2007 | Aalwar | "Anbulla Kadhali" | Srikanth Deva | |
| 2007 | Pokkiri | "Aadungada Yennai Suththi" | Mani Sharma | |
| 2007 | Deepavali | "Thoduven Thoduven" | Yuvan Shankar Raja | |
| 2007 | Sabari | "Osama Osama" | Mani Sharma | |
| 2007 | Manikanda | "Pondicherry" | Deva | |
| 2007 | Madurai Veeran | "Nee Thaanadi" | Srikanth Deva | |
| 2007 | Ninaithaley | "Ilaiyaraaja A. R. Rahman" | Vijay Antony | |
| 2007 | Nam Naadu | All Songs | Srikanth Deva | |
| 2007 | Naalaiya Pozhuthum Unnodu | "Pesa Paraasa", "Sollamaley" | Srikanth Deva | |
| 2007 | Polladhavan | "Paduchu Pathen" | Dhina while three other songs composed by G.V. Prakash Kumar | |
| 2008 | Pirivom Santhippom | "Medhuva Medhuva" | Vidyasagar | |
| 2008 | Anjathe | "Kaththazha Kannalaa", "Kannadasan Karaikudi" | Sundar C Babu | |
| 2008 | Thotta | "Saami Aduda" | Srikanth Deva | |
| 2008 | Velli Thirai | "Kanchi Paanai", "Thaiyare Thaiya" | G.V. Prakash Kumar | |
| 2008 | Arasangam | "Jil Jill", "Pookal Ethanai", "Ko Kuruvi" | Srikanth Deva | |
| 2008 | Arai En 305-il Kadavul | "Aavaram Poovukkum" | Vidyasagar | |
| 2008 | Kuruvi | "Dandaana Darna" | Vidyasagar | |
| 2008 | Sathyam | "Paal Pappali" | Harris Jayaraj | |
| 2008 | Jayamkondaan | "Adhai Koodava" | Vidyasagar | |
| 2008 | Raman Thediya Seethai | "Mazhai Nindra" | Vidyasagar | |
| 2009 | Villu | "Hey Rama Rama", "Vaada Maappilley" | Devi Sri Prasad | |
| 2009 | Perumal | All Songs | Srikanth Deva | |
| 2009 | Guru En Aalu | "Kadhal Kannadiyil", "Kadhal Kolagalam" | Srikanth Deva | |
| 2009 | Thoranai | "Pattucha" | Mani Sharma | |
| 2009 | Naadodigal | "Aadungada" | Sundar C Babu | |
| 2009 | Aarumaname | "Chithiram Pesuthadi", "Yaaro Yaaro" | Srikanth Deva | |
| 2009 | Kannukulle | "Patchai Meni" | Ilayaraaja | |
| 2009 | Oru Kadhalan Oru Kadhali | All songs | Bharani | |
| 2009 | Suriyan Satta Kalloori | All songs except "Theeka Theeka" | Deva | |
| 2009 | Aadhavan | "Vaarayo Vaarayo" | Harris Jayaraj | |
| 2009 | Vettaikaaran | "Naan Adicha", "Karigalan Kala", "Puli Urumudhu" | Vijay Antony | |
| 2009 | Kandhakottai | "Unnai Kadhali Yendru" | Dhina | |
| 2010 | Sura | "Naan Nadanthal Athiradi", "Vanga Kadal Ellai", "Thamizhan Veera Thamizhan" | Mani Sharma | |
| 2010 | Guru Sishyan | "Aandava Andava", "Kathara Kathara", "Aataiyai Podu", "Subaiya Subaiya" | Dhina | |
| 2010 | Veluthu Kattu | "Singampatti" | Bharani | |
| 2010 | Nandalala | "Oru Vandu Koottame" | Ilayaraaja | |
| 2011 | Kaavalan | "Pattamboochi" | Vidyasagar | |
| 2011 | Ayyan | "Manasoram" | Ilayaraaja | |
| 2011 | Avargalum Ivargalum | "Idhu Oru Kadhal" | Srikanth Deva | |
| 2011 | Ko | "Gala Gala" | Harris Jayaraj | |
| 2011 | Mudhal Idam | "Pappara Pappara" | D. Imman | |
| 2011 | Vedi | "Kadhalikka" | Vijay Antony | |
| 2011 | Raa Raa | "Aambalaina Dhillu" | Srikanth Deva | |
| 2011 | 7 Aum Arivu | "Yamma Yamma" | Harris Jayaraj | |
| 2011 | Poraali | "Vedi Podu" | Sundar C Babu | |
| 2012 | Vilayada Vaa | "Lali Lali Kadhali", "Vanthenda Vettriku Veeranai" | Srimurali | |
| 2012 | Kondaan Koduthaan | "Thillana Pattukari", "Pavadai Pattampuchiye", & "Paatha Pakkure" | Deva | |
| 2012 | Ullam | "Kokkalanga Kuruvi" | Yuvan Shankar Raja | |
| 2012 | Aathi Narayana | "Kanna Nee", "Karuppayee" | Srikanth Deva | |
| 2012 | Marupadiyum Oru Kadhal | "Salakku Salakku" | Srikanth Deva | |
| 2012 | Attakathi | "Aasai Oru Pulveli", "Aadi Pona Aavani" | Santhosh Narayanan | |
| 2012 | Pizza | "Mogathirai" | Santhosh Narayanan | |
| 2013 | Samar | "Vellai Mayil" | Yuvan Shankar Raja | |
| 2013 | Thulli Vilayadu | "Ammadi Athadi" | Srikanth Deva | |
| 2013 | Maryan | "Innum Konjam Naeram" | A.R. Rahman | Co written by A. R. Rahman |
| 2013 | Endrendrum Punnagai | "Othayilae" | Harris Jayaraj | |
| 2013 | Arjunan Kadhali | "En Uyire", "Yaaro Yaaro", "Yetho Yetho" | Deva and Srikanth Deva | |
| 2014 | Thegidi | "Yaar Ezhuthiyatho", "Vinmeen Vithaiyil", "Kangalai Oru", "Neethaane" | Nivas K. Prasanna | |
| 2014 | Nimirndhu Nil | "Kadhal Nergayil", "Rajadhi Raja" | G.V. Prakash Kumar | |
| 2014 | Anjaan | "Kadhal Assai" | Yuvan Shankar Raja | |
| 2014 | Madras | "Aagayam Theepidicha", "Chennai Vada Chennai" | Santhosh Narayanan | |
| 2014 | Yaan | "Aathangara Orathil", "Nenje Nenje" | Harris Jayaraj | Won Vijay Award for Best Lyricist for Aathangara Orathil |
| 2014 | Nadodi Vamsam | "Dora Dora", "Kuthavarava", "Poove Unthan" | | |
| 2014 | Vaarayo Vennilave | "Ambani Ponnu", "En Kadhal" | | |
| 2015 | I | "Mersalaayiten", "Ennodu Nee Irundhaal" | A.R.Rahman | |
| 2015 | Inimey Ippadithan | "Athana Azhagayum", "Thaedi Odunaen" | Santhosh Dhayanidhi | |
| 2015 | Trisha Illana Nayanthara | "Yennachu Yedhachu" | G.V. Prakash Kumar | |
| 2016 | Koditta Idangalai Nirappuga | "En Oruthiye" | C. Sathya | |
| 2016 | Saagasam | "Pudikkum" | S. Thaman | |
| 2016 | Theri | "Chella Kutti", "Raangu" | G.V. Prakash Kumar | |
| 2016 | Kabali | "Ulagam Oruvanukka", "Vaanam Paarthen" | Santhosh Narayanan | |
| 2017 | Mupparimanam | "Kannodu Kannodu" | G.V. Prakash Kumar | |
| 2017 | Bongu | "Ambu Villada", "Vella Kuthira" | Srikanth Deva | |
| 2018 | Sketch | "Vaanam Thoorammalae" | S. Thaman | |
| 2018 | Kaala: Karikaalan | "Katravai Patravai" | Santhosh Narayanan | |
| 2018 | Raja Ranguski | "Pattukutty Neethan" | Yuvan Shankar Raja | |
| 2019 | Dev | "Engade Nee Pone" | Harris Jayaraj | |
| 2019 | Mariyappan | | | |
| 2019 | NGK | "Thandalkaaran" | Yuvan Shankar Raja | |
| 2019 | Kaappaan | "Kurilae Kurilae" | Harris Jayaraj | |
| 2019 | Zhagaram | "Idhuvarai Naan" | Dharan Kumar | |
| 2019 | Champion | "Veerane Vana" | Arrol Corelli | |
| 2020 | Psycho | "Unna Nenachu", "Neenga Mudiyuma" | Ilayaraaja | |
| 2020 | Jail | "Kathodu kathanen" | G.V. Prakash Kumar | |
| 2021 | Sarpatta Parambarai | "Vambula Thumbula" | Santhosh Narayanan | |
| 2021 | Gallata Kalayanam | ‘’Ithudan En Kadhai’’ and ‘’Kadhal Solla’’ | A.R. Rahman | |
| Pisasu 2 | "Uchanthala Regayile" | Karthik Raja | | |
| 2022 | Ponniyin Selvan: I | "Ratchasa Maamaney" | A.R. Rahman | |
| 2023 | Bommai Nayagi | "Adiye Raasaathi", "Vaanam Thaiyaga" | Sundaramurthy K S | |
| 2023 | Maaveeran | "Scene Ah Scene Ah" | Bharath Sankar | |
| 2023 | Lal Salaam | "Ae Pulla" | A.R. Rahman | |
| 2024 | Star | "Vintage Love" | Yuvan Shankar Raja | |
| 2024 | Gajaana | "Kagidha Megam" | Vikram Varman | |

=== As an actor ===
- Dasavathaaram (2008) – Assistant to Vincent Poovaragavan.

=== Television ===
- 2003 Sorgam
- 2004 Kanavarukkaga
- 2005 Nimmathi
- 2006 Kasthuri
- 2007 Akka Thangai
- 2007 Manjal Magimai
- 2009 Mahalakshmi

== Awards ==
- Kalaimamani Award by the State of Tamilnadu in 2006
- Tamil Nadu State Film Award for Best Lyricist (2003) - For the Film Parthiban Kanavu
- Vijay Award for Best Lyricist for the song Aathangara Orathil from the Film Yaan.
- Mirchi Music Awards South Lyricist of the Year 2015 for the song Ennodu Nee Irunthaal from the Film I (2015 film).
- Behindwoods Gold Medals for the song Vinmeen Vithaiyil from the Film Thegidi.
