= Madurai Veeran (2007 film) =

- Official DVD Cover
- Directed by: R. K. Vincent Selva
- Written by: Ashok Iyer (dialogue)
- Screenplay by: R. K. Vincent Selva
- Story by: Teja (unc.)
- Based on: Nuvvu Nenu (Telugu)
- Produced by: Sayed Kader
- Starring: Jithan Ramesh; Saloni Aswani
- Cinematography: I. Andrew
- Edited by: V. Jaishankar
- Music by: Srikanth Deva
- Release date: 18 April 2007
- Running time: 148 minutes
- Country: India
- Language: Tamil

Madurai Veeran is a 2007 Indian Tamil-language action romance film directed by R. K. Vincent Selva. The film stars Jithan Ramesh and Saloni Aswani. The score and soundtrack are composed by Srikanth Deva. The film is the Tamil remake of the 2001 Telugu film Nuvvu Nenu directed by Teja. Selva and Ramesh previously collaborated for Jithan (2005). Jithan Ramesh's voice is dubbed by his brother Jiiva.

== Plot ==
Shiva is the only son of a rich businessman. He grows up surrounded by money and he is not cared for by his parents, due to his mother dying when he was a young boy and his father is business-minded and only cares about his money. Shiva and his friends are playful and athletic, and do not study. Priya, who also goes to the same college (the college was created and run by Shiva's family) Shiva attends, is the daughter of a cow herder and a gangster Mayandi. Priya keeps her distance from Shiva, but as the film progresses, they inevitably become friends. Their friendship then develops into romance, but this love is opposed by both their parents. Both their parents try to separate them, they try to get them married of to different people. They eventually run away together, and a hit man is after Priya's life (hired by Shiva's father). In a confrontation with the hit-man, Shiva gets wounded but defeats the hit man, storms into his father's office, and throws the hit-man at him. He then informs his father of his wedding in front of the district court. His father turns up with a large battalion of police officers, while Shiva turns up with a much large number of students. The film ends with their wedding successfully happening, and Mayandi giving his blessings.

== Cast ==
- Jithan Ramesh as Shiva
- Saloni Aswani as Priya
- Lal as Mayandi, Priya's Father
- Telangana Shakuntala as Mayandi's sister
- Vennira Aadai Moorthy as College principal
- Cochin Haneefa as Teacher
- Avinash as Vishvanathan, Shiva's father
- Manobala as Shiva's grandfather
- Ganja Karuppu as himself
- Kanal Kannan as himself
- Robo Shankar as himself
- Suja Varunee as Sunitha (special appearance)
- Mumaith Khan as Special appearance
- Thangadurai as Shiva's friend (uncredited)

== Soundtrack ==
Songs composed by Srikanth Deva. The song "Kaalaiyum Neeye" is based on Telugu song "Cheppave Prema" from Manasantha Nuvve (2001).

| No. | Song | Singers | Length (m:ss) | Lyrics |
|---|---|---|---|---|
| 1 | "Yadava Theruvili" | Gana Ulaganathan, Blaaze | 4:13 | Vijay Sagar |
| 2 | "Kalaiyum Neeye" | Srikanth Deva, Febi Mani | 4:47 | Pa. Vijay |
| 3 | "Mudhal Mudhalaga" | Shreya Ghoshal | 4:34 | Pa. Vijay |
| 4 | "Nee Thaanadi" | Harish Raghavendra | 3:51 | Kabilan |
| 5 | "Uyirum Uyirum" | Surmukhi Raman, Senthildass Velayutham | 3:10 | Pa. Vijay |
| 6 | "Gokka Makka" | Priyadarshini, Srikanth Deva, Senthildass Velayutham | 4:05 | Perarasu |

== Reception ==
Sify wrote "It is a crass film that drags with plenty of double entendre and inane songs tuned by Sreekanth Deva". Chennai Online wrote "The rich guy-poor girl saga finds yet another exposure in 'Madurai Veeran'. With the story taking the predictable line, there is not much that is fresh or exciting here." News Today wrote "Vincent Selvah has tried to dish out a commercial entertainer with dollops of romance. An overdose of stunt sequences toward the end is the jarring aspect. But the movie has the ammunitions to hold the audience interest". Lajjavathi of Kalki praised the performances of Ramesh and Saloni and Srikanth Deva's music and called the screenplay as dull and noted a climax comes when half of the movie is over, and when you wake up thinking the movie is over, the real climax hits your head after half an hour and concluded calling it a film which should have come out better but missed somewhere.
