= Vidyardhi =

Indian movie

- Directed by: Balachari
- Screenplay by: Balachari
- Dialogues by: Balachari; Ravi
- Story by: Balachari
- Produced by: R. B. Choudary
- Starring: Ramesh; Aditi Agarwal
- Cinematography: Srinivas
- Edited by: Nandamuri Hari
- Music by: Mani Sharma
- Production company: Super Good Films
- Release date: 9 December 2004
- Country: India
- Language: Telugu

Vidyardhi is a 2004 Telugu-language romantic drama film directed by Balachari, who worked as an assistant director for S. Shankar and Bhagyaraj. The film stars newcomer Ramesh and Aditi Agarwal in the lead roles, with Prakash Raj and Rahul Dev in pivotal roles.

== Plot ==
A mafia don, Salim Ibrahim, creates issues at an engineering college by killing the chairman and closing the campus. The rest of the plot is how a student, Kranthi, saves his college.

== Cast ==
- Ramesh as Kranthi
- Aditi Agarwal as Jahnavi
- Prakash Raj as Principal
- Rahul Dev as Salim Ibrahim
- Brahmanandam
- Kovai Sarala
- Tanikella Bharani
- Giri Babu
- Venu Gopal
- Rajitha
- Vizag Prasad
- Malladi Raghava
- Navabharat Balaji
- Abhinaya Krishna

== Production ==
The muhurat of the film was at Annapurna Studios in October 2003. The chief guests included Harikrishna, Jagapati Babu, Uday Kiran, Tarun, Jeevitha, D Ramanaidu, Allu Arvind, M.S. Raju, NV Prasad, and Ashok Kumar. This film marked the acting debut of R. B. Choudary's son, Ramesh. Mamata Zhaveri, who acted in television commercials, was selected to play the lead actress. The film was shot primarily in Hyderabad and Mumbai. The first schedule of the film was on October 27. Zhaveri was later replaced with Aditi Agarwal. The film was scheduled to release in April 2004, but was further delayed to December.

== Soundtrack ==
The soundtrack was composed by Mani Sharma.

- "Sye Syete" – Ganapathi
- "Hyderabad Hai" – Krishnaraj
- "Oke Okkasari" – S. P. B. Charan
- "Virise Prathi" – Hariharan
- "Empilla" – Mallikarjun
- "Andhra Khiladi Vidyardhi" - Tippu, Mahalakshmi, Premji (chorus/rap)

== Release and reception ==
The film was released to negative reviews. A critic from Idlebrain.com criticized the contrasting first and second halves of the film. The second half of the film is reminiscent of Sye. A critic from Sify wrote that "The music of Mani Sharma is hummable though other aspects are formulaic and predictable with no major twists. Nothing much to write about the lead pair. Ramesh has no screen presence and the film fails to impress". The film did not run well.
