= Iraniyan (film) =

- Title card
- Directed by: Vincent Selva
- Screenplay by: Vincent Selva
- Starring: Murali; Meena
- Cinematography: Balasubramaniem
- Edited by: S. S. Vasu; Saleem
- Music by: Deva
- Production company: Thaaraas Creations
- Release date: 18 November 1999
- Country: India
- Language: Tamil

Iraniyan (Tamil pronunciation: [iɾaɳijan]) is a 1999 Indian Tamil language film directed by Vincent Selva. The film stars Murali and Meena, while Raghuvaran, Vadivelu and Ranjith play other supporting roles. A fictionalised biography of the Indian freedom fighter Vattakudi Iraniyan, it was released on 18 November 1999. Raghuvaran won the Dinakaran Cinema Award for Best Villain.

== Plot ==
Vattakudi Iraniyan is a home-coming military man who becomes a rebel after witnessing caste discrimination and brutal killings by a landlord over lower caste people. Iraniyan escapes execution and returns to his village, where he finds that the poor are being oppressed by the landlord. He then sets out to exact punishment on the oppressors.

== Cast ==
- Murali as Iraniyan
- Meena as Ponni
- Raghuvaran as Aande
- Vadivelu as Chinnaswamy
- Ranjith as police officer
- Thalaivasal Vijay
- Vijayakumari as Iraniyan's mother
- Ambika as Aande's wife
- Delhi Ganesh as Ponni's father
- Rajasekar as Iraniyan's father
- Ajay Rathnam as Aande's son
- Bala Singh
- Mahanadi Shankar
- S. N. Lakshmi
- Muthukaalai
- Sriman as Iraniyan's friend
- Sanjeev as Iraniyan's brother
- Shiju as Aande's right hand (uncredited)
- Ramji (uncredited special appearance in "Ayyarettu")

== Production ==
The film was originally titled Vattakudi Iraniyan. A legal suit was filed against the makers regarding this, and subsequently the prefix was removed.

== Soundtrack ==
The music was composed by Deva.

Song	Singers	Lyrics
"Ayyarettu"	Anuradha Sriram, Krishnaraj	Vairamuthu
"Chandirane Satchi"	K. S. Chithra	Na. Muthukumar
"Cheepoya Nee"	S. Janaki, S. P. Balasubrahmanyam	Palani Bharathi
"En Maaman Madurai"	Swarnalatha	Na. Muthukumar
"Varaan Paru"	Deva	Thyagarajan

== Reception ==
Malini Mannath of Chennai Online noted "this is worth a watch. Murali performs with intensity and conviction." Aurangazeb of Kalki praised the film for its realistic approach and cast. Malathi Rangarajan of The Hindu wrote, "Despite the abrupt ending of certain scenes and dialogues coming out in spurts in many places thus giving the impression that it is more of miming than clear dialogue delivery, Iraniyan appeals – at least the first half surely does. The flaws seem to be due to the cuts in scenes and dialogues". K. N. Vijiyan of New Straits Times described the camerawork and art direction as plus points, and also said the story was "easy to follow", but wished more exploits of the real Iraniyan were shown. Ananda Vikatan lauded Murali's performance and the efforts taken to create the period look, but felt the film occasionally drags.
