= Vijay Award for Best Choreographer =

Indian film award category

The Vijay Award for Best Choreographer is given by the Tamil-language Star Vijay TV channel as part of its annual Vijay Awards ceremony for Tamil (Kollywood) films.

== The list ==
Here is a list of the award winners and the films for which they won.

Year	Choreographer	Film	Link
2017	Brinda	Kaatru Veliyidai	
2014	Shobi Paulraj	Jeeva	
2013	Brinda	Kadal	
2012	Robert	Podaa Podi	
2011	Radhika	Avan Ivan	
2010	Dinesh	Easan	
2009	Shobi Paulraj	TN 07 AL 4777	
2008	Dhina	Anjathey	
2007	Dinesh	Pokkiri	
2006	Prabhu Deva	-	

== Nominations ==
- 2007 Dinesh - "Vasantha Mullai" (Pokkiri)
  - Ajay Raaj - "Jalsa" (Chennai 600028)
  - Brindha - "Unakkul Naane" (Pachaikili Muthucharam)
  - Lawrence Raghavendra - "Athiradee" (Sivaji)
  - Raju Sundaram - "June Ponal" (Unnale Unnale)
- 2008 Dhina - "Kaththala Kannaley" (Anjathey)
  - Brindha - "Anjalai" (Vaaranam Aayiram)
  - Robert - "Nalamthaana" (Silambattam)
  - Shobi Paulraj - "Taxi Taxi" (Sakkarakatti)
- 2009 Shobi Paulraj - "Aathi Chudi" (TN 07 AL 4777)
  - Baba Bhaskar - "Daddy Mummy" (Villu)
  - Dinesh - "Pala Pala" (Ayan)
  - Saravana Rajan - "Allegra" (Kanthaswamy)
  - Shobi Paulraj - "Damakku"(Aadhavan)
- 2010 Dinesh - "Jilla Veettu" (Easan)
  - Remo Fernandez - "Irumbile Oru Irudhaiyam" (Enthiran)
  - Kandaas - "Un Per Solla" (Angadi Theru)
  - Raju Sundaram - "Kilimanjaro" (Enthiran)
  - Flexy Stu - "Hosanna" (Vinnaithaandi Varuvaayaa)
- 2011 K. Suchitra - "Dia Dia Dole" (Avan Ivan)
  - Dhina- "Maasama" (Engeyum Eppodhum)
  - Dinesh - "Otha Sollala" (Aadukalam)
  - Kalyan - "Kaadhal Yen Kaadhal" (Mayakkam Enna)
  - Raju Sundaram - "Nangaai" (Engeyum Kadhal)
- 2012 Robert - "Love Panlama Venama" (Podaa Podi)
  - Dinesh - "Venaam Machan" (Oru Kal Oru Kannadi)
  - Farah Khan - "Irukkana" (Nanban)
  - Shobi Paulraj - "Antarctica" (Thuppakki)
  - Sridhar - "Alaikka Laikka" (Thuppakki)
- 2013 Brinda - "Adiyae" (Kadal)
  - Baba Bhaskar - "Local Boys" (Ethir Neechal)
  - Pandit Birju Maharaj - "Unnai Kaanadhu Naan" (Vishwaroopam)
  - Sherif (choreographer) - "Kasu Panam" (Soodhu Kavvum)
  - Sridhar - "Tamizh Pasanga" (Thalaiva)
- 2014 Shobi Paulraj - "Oruthi Mela" (Jeeva)
  - Baba Bhaskar - "What a Karavaad" (Velaiyilla Pattathari)
  - Brinda - "Darling Dambakku" (Maan Karate)
  - Raju Sundaram - "Sandi Kuthirai" (Kaaviya Thalaivan)
  - Sathish Krishnan - "Kaagidha Kappal" (Madras)

== See also ==
- Tamil cinema
- Cinema of India
