= Jithan Ramesh =

Indian actor and film producer

- Born: Ramesh Choudary; 23 October 1982 (age 43); Madras, Tamil Nadu, India
- Occupations: Actor, film producer
- Years active: 2004–2023
- Spouse: Shilpa
- Children: 2
- Father: R. B. Choudary
- Relatives: Jiiva (brother)

Ramesh Choudary, also known by his stage name Jithan Ramesh, is an Indian actor and film producer who works in Tamil cinema. He is the third son of the late film producer R. B. Choudary and the elder brother of actor Jiiva. He made his breakthrough with the thriller film Jithan (2005) and has continued to appear in lead roles.

== Career ==
=== 2004–2007 ===
Ramesh made his acting debut through the Telugu language film, Vidyardhi (2004), produced by his father R. B. Choudary's studio Super Good Films. Ramesh received negative response for his premiere lead role. He then appeared in his first Tamil language film, Jithan (2005), which was simultaneously shot with the Hindi film Gayab (2004). Directed by Vincent Selva and produced by Radaan Mediaworks, the film starred Ramesh as an introverted student who gets superpowers, and featured him alongside Pooja in the lead role. The film and Ramesh's performance received awesome reviews. While a critic from The Hindu noted that he does a "convincing job", a reviewer from Sify.com noted "Ramesh has miles to go before he gets his expressions correct". Jithan performed well commercially at the box-office, prompting Ramesh to add the title Jithan to his stagename.

Soon after the release of Jithan, Ramesh signed multiple films including the romantic dramas Madhu (2006) and Nee Venunda Chellam (2006), as well as the comedy drama Jery (2006), written by Crazy Mohan. The former two films did not perform well commercially, affecting box-office value of his films. Regarding his performance in Nee Venunda Chellam, a reviewer from Rediff.com wrote mixed reviews about the movie". Jery received better reviews, with a critic adding "Ramesh, in a breezy role, enjoys every bit of it" and "though comedy is not his strong suit, he has tried his best and come out with a satisfactory performance". His following two films Madurai Veeran (2007) and Puli Varudhu (2007) were action dramas, which earned mixed reviews upon release.

=== 2011–2016 ===
After a four-year break from films, Ramesh's next release was Osthe (2011), where he portrayed a supporting role as the brother of Silambarasan's character. During the film's promotional campaign, Silambarasan noted that he could not think of anyone else to play that particular role, while Ramesh announced his delight at working in a big star cast. The film had a high-profile release at the box office, but earned mixed reviews from critics. Ramesh's performance was described as a "surprise" by The Hindu, while Rediff.com noted that he was "colourless". He then played the lead role in Kishore Tirumala's directorial debut Pillaiyar Theru Kadaisi Veedu (2011) opposite Sanchita Padukone. The film, produced by his father, went largely unnoticed.

As his acting career continued to falter, Ramesh chose to prioritise his work as a co-producer with his family's studio, Super Good Films. During the mid-2010s, he notably launched a spiritual sequel to Jithan during 2013, and then appeared in a supporting role as a police officer in the Malayalam film Day Night Game (2014). Jithan 2 (2016) eventually had a delayed release three years later, with Ramesh reprising a role of a timid individual who experiences paranormal activity. The film opened to negative reviews, with a reviewer from Rediff noting "unfortunately Ramesh has a blank expression throughout, irrespective of what the scene demands".

=== 2019–2023 ===
Following a further break from acting, Ramesh returned to Telugu films after with Okate Life (2019) directed by M. Venkat. The film had a low profile release. He played a negative role in the Telugu film Nireekshana, which had a delayed release in 2023. He then worked on the adult comedy Ongala Podanum Sir (2019), which was publicised prior to release as his comeback to Tamil-language films. The film garnered unfavourable reviews for its content and went unnoticed at the box office.

In 2020, he was involved as a participant in Star Vijay's reality television show, Bigg Boss Tamil 4, hosted by Kamal Haasan. Regarding his performance in Farhana (2023), a critic from The Times of India wrote that "The character of Jithan Ramesh, who portrays Aishwarya Rajesh's husband, is well-crafted as a progressive Muslim man with his own insecurities, and Ramesh delivers a commendable performance". He played a man who works under Karthi and later betrays him in Japan (2023), which was a surprise box office failure. After, Jithan Ramesh appears in his solo hero project Route No. 17 which hit screens on 29 December 2023.

== Personal life ==
Ramesh is the third son of R. B. Choudary and the elder brother of actor Jiiva. His father is a Hindu of Marwari heritage born in Chennai to Marwari-speaking Rajasthani migrants. Choudary practices Hinduism along with his siblings. He attended Gill Adarsh Matriculation Higher Secondary School in Royapettah, Chennai and he completed his Business Administration degree from D.G. Vaishnav College. Choudary married Shilpa in February 2006 and has two children.

== Filmography ==
- All films are in Tamil, unless otherwise noted.

Year	Title	Role	Notes
2004	Vidyardhi	Kranthi	Telugu film
2005	Jithan	Surya	
2006	Madhu	Madhukrishnan	
2006	Jery	Jayaram (Jery)	
2006	Nee Venunda Chellam	Kanna	
2007	Madurai Veeran	Shiva	
2007	Puli Varudhu	Ramesh	
2011	Pillaiyar Theru Kadaisi Veedu	Ganesh	
2011	Osthe	Balan	
2012	Oru Nadigaiyin Vaakkumoolam	Himself	Cameo appearance
2014	Jilla	Dancer	Cameo appearance
2014	Day Night Game	Muhammed Iqbal	Malayalam film
2016	Jithan 2	Surya	
2019	Okate Life	Ram	Telugu film
2019	Ongala Podanum Sir	David	
2023	Farhana	Kareem	
2023	Nireekshana	David Daniel Raj	Telugu film; only dubbed version released
2023	Japan	Gangadhar	
2023	Route No. 17	Freddy	

== Television ==
Year	Series/Shows	Role	Channel	Notes
2020	Bigg Boss Tamil 4	Contestant	Star Vijay	Evicted Day 69
2020	Bigg Boss Telugu 4	Guest	Star Maa	Crossover episode with Bigg Boss Tamil 4
2021	BB Jodigal Season 1	Contestant	Star Vijay	Runner up Paired with Samyuktha
