= Nee Venunda Chellam =

- Title card
- Directed by: L. Venkatesan
- Written by: L. Venkatesan
- Produced by: A. Palanivel; V. C. Anandan
- Starring: Ramesh; Gajala; Namitha
- Music by: Dhina
- Production company: AP Film Garden
- Release date: 17 August 2006
- Running time: 145 minutes
- Country: India
- Language: Tamil

Nee Venunda Chellam (transl. I want you, dear) is a 2006 Indian Tamil-language romantic action film, written and directed by L. Venkatesan, starring Ramesh, Gajala and Namitha in lead roles, with Thilakan, Vivek and Vincent Asokan playing supporting roles. The music is composed by Dhina. The film was released on 17 August 2006.

== Plot ==
The movie begins with Kannan falling in love with Geetha, a girl living in his neighborhood. Her father Viswanathan, a government employee, learns of Kannan's crushes on his daughter and plays all tricks and prevents Kannan from reaching out to his daughter.

Anjali also resides in the same locality. Ashok, a dreaded gangster and Anjali's uncle, makes plans to marry her. He ends up bashing all those who try to propose Anjali.

The turn of events results in Anjali mistaking Kannan of loving her. This results in Ashokan's men go behind Kannan's trail. Meanwhile, Kannan manages to meet Geetha and opens his heart. Learning of this, Anjali manages to kidnap Geetha and threatens Kannan to marry her.

== Cast ==
- Ramesh as Kannan
- Gajala as Geetha Viswanathan
- Namitha as Anjali
- Babilona in a special appearance
- Thilakan as Viswanathan
- Vivek as Renigunda Reddy/Royapuram Mani
- Vincent Asokan as Ashok
- Nizhalgal Ravi as Kannan's father
- Thambi Ramaiah

== Soundtrack ==
Soundtrack was composed by Dhina.

Song	Singers	Lyrics
"Ennada Athisayam"	Jassie Gift, Mahathi	Pa. Vijay
"Eppadiyum"	Mahathi, Silambarasan	Snehan
"Ethanai Jenmam"	Sadhana Sargam, Harish Raghavendra	Pa. Vijay
"Kallathoni"	Suchitra, Karthik	Yugabharathi
"Kannanai"	Chinmayi	Kabilan
"Kanniponnu"	Tippu	Snehan

== Critical reception ==
Rediff.com wrote "When you have 'Jithan' Ramesh, Gajala and Namitha in the star cast, you can expect nothing but a potboiler like Nee venunda Chellam. However, except for Gajala and Thilakan, the actors all compete for a Most Wooden Performance award, with Ramesh clearly emerging as the winner". Sify wrote "There is nothing new in the story and director L.Venkatesan makes it too long at 2 hours 35 min, while the film loses its steam in 15 minutes after the first scene!". Chennai Online wrote "In Nee Venunda Chellam, a fairly engaging entertainer, the director has balanced the five main characters judiciously, giving each the importance and the footage it deserved. With the focus shifting to each character at different stages of the plot, each actor gets his or her space to perform. A more taut screenplay and a tighter grip on the narration would have turned the film into a better one".
