= Route No. 17 =

2023 Indian film by Abhilash G Devan

- Theatrical release poster
- Directed by: Abhilash G Devan
- Written by: Abhilash G Devan
- Produced by: Dr.Amar Ramachandran
- Starring: Jithan Ramesh; Anju Sasi; Akhil Prabhakar
- Cinematography: Prasanth Pranavam
- Edited by: Akhilesh Mohan
- Music by: Ouseppachan
- Production company: Neni Entertainments Private Limited
- Release date: 29 December 2023
- Running time: 139 minutes
- Country: India
- Language: Tamil

Route No. 17 is a 2023 Indian Tamil-language horror thriller film, written and directed by Abhilash G Devan. The film stars Jithan Ramesh, Anju Sasi (In her Tamil debut), Akhil Prabhakar and Hareesh Peradi in lead roles. The film is touted as the comeback film of Ramesh with Malayalam composer Ouseppachan scoring the music.

The film was released on 29 December 2023, with positive reviews.

== Plot ==
The film portrays many eerie happenings in the forests of Sathyamangalam, where its forest path has been shut for 30 years for a mysterious reason. The suspense thickens when trespassers do not return alive from the forest.

== Cast ==
- Jithan Ramesh as Freddy
- Anju Sasi as Anjana
- Akhil Prabhakar as Karthik
- Hareesh Peradi
- Titus Abraham as Natarajan
- Madhankumar Dhakshinamoorthy as Vignesh
- Frolic George
- Nihal Amar
- Jennifer Mathew
- Anusree Pothan
- Amar Ramachandran as Salim
- Bindhu Jayan

== Production ==
Route No. 17 is director Abhilash G Devan's second Tamil film after the acclaimed 'Thai Nilam' produced by Dr.Amar Ramachandran. Ramesh became popular after his Big Boss stint and he was signed to play the lead with 3 different looks. Ramesh performed a major sequence in a 5500 square foot set work of cave constructed below ground level, where no ambiance to get free air, for 22 days.

== Soundtrack ==
Route No. 17

Soundtrack album by Ouseppachan
- Released: 2023
- Genre: Feature film soundtrack
- Length: 10:56
- Language: Tamil
- Label: Ayngaran International

Ouseppachan chronology
Pappachan Olivilanu (2023)	Route No. 17 (2023)

All music is composed by Ouseppachan.

Track listing
No.	Title	Lyrics	Singer(s)	Length
1.	"Rasa En Rasa Kanne"	Yugabharathi	Swetha Mohan	3:25
2.	"All Is Well"	Arya	OfRo, Arya (rap)	3:07
3.	"Vaada Thiruda"	Senthamizh Dhasan	Rita Thyagarajan	4:24
Total length:				10:56

== Reception ==
A critic from Maalai Malar appreciated the film's cinematography, editing and music, but rated the film losing its knit in the second half after a decent first half. Raisa Nasreen of Times Now rated the film with 3/5 stars, stating that Jithan Ramesh film unveils mystery and suspense in the Sathyamangalam forest.
