= Robert (choreographer) =

Indian choreographer and actor (born 1981)

- Born: 26 January 1981 (age 45); Chennai, India
- Other name: Robert Master
- Occupations: Choreographer; Film director; Film producer; Actor
- Years active: 1990–present

Robert Raj (born 26 January 1981) is an Indian choreographer and actor who has worked in India's several regional film industries. He has also appeared as an actor, often portraying villainous roles or by making cameo appearances in songs he has choreographed.

== Career ==
Robert began his career as a child artiste, notably playing Mammooty's son in Azhagan (1991). Robert then featured as a villain in films, with major acting roles in Sathyaraj's Maaran (2002) and the 2005 film Dancer, which told the story of a disabled student making it successful as a dancer. Portraying the antagonist, Robert won critical acclaim for his portrayal and secured the Tamil Nadu State Film Award for Best Villain later that year. In the period, he also featured in Pavalakodi (2003), with reviewers criticizing his performance.

Robert won the Vijay Award for Best Choreographer for his work in Podaa Podi (2012), in which he also made a cameo appearance in the video of "Love Panlamma?"

Prior to the release of the film Motta Shiva Ketta Shiva (2017), actor Tinku released a video alleging that composer Amresh Ganesh had stolen a song titled "Hara Hara Mahadevaki" from a film that he and Robert were making titled Thaathaa Car-ai Thodadhae. Tinku alleged that Amresh had worked together with them to create the song during early 2015, but production troubles had shelved the film and subsequently Amresh had taken the song to a different project. In a press meet in February 2017, Amresh Ganesh refuted the claims and provided evidence of Tinku and Robert continuously trying to scam him by gathering funds for the shelved project. Amresh stated that he had developed the song free of cost and had paid for the duo to take part in a failed shoot of the song in Bangkok, before the film was stalled. Moreover, Amresh revealed that Robert had owned up to playing the song to music composer Srikanth Deva, and had attempted to include it in another shelved film titled Minor Kunju Kaanom which Tinku, Robert and Srikanth Deva were involved in.

== Personal life ==
Robert's elder sister Alphonsa, has also appeared in Tamil films.

== Filmography ==
=== As an actor ===
| Year | Film | Role | Notes |
|---|---|---|---|
| 1991 | Azhagan | Azhagappan's son | Child artist |
| 2002 | Maaran | Shivadas | |
| 2003 | Pavalakkodi | Robert | |
| 2004 | Jai | Mohan | |
| 2005 | Dancer | Arun | Tamil Nadu State Film Award for Best Villain |
| 2007 | Veduka | | Telugu film |
| 2014 | MGR Sivaji Rajini Kamal | Battu | Also director |
| 2018 | Ondikku Ondi | Joe | |
| 2020 | Alti | | |
| 2020 | Mugilan | Saravanan | Web series released on ZEE5 |
| 2023 | Striker | | |
| 2024 | Never Escape | Theatre Owner | |
| 2025 | Mrs & Mr | Arun | |
| 2026 | Agadha | maharaja | ZEE5 |

=== As a dancer ===
| Year | Film | Song(s) | Notes |
|---|---|---|---|
| 1996 | Maanbumigu Maanavan | "Kodu Poda" | |
| 1996 | Tamizh Selvan | "Rajasthanu" "Unnal Mudiyum" | |
| 1996 | Kadhal Desam | "Kalloori Saalai" | |
| 1996 | Mannava | "Yamma Yamma" | |
| 1997 | Sakthi | "Maana Madurai Ponnu" | |
| 1997 | Kaalamellam Kaathiruppen | "Anjam Number" | |
| 1997 | Kaalamellam Kadhal Vaazhga | "Babelona Thirachai Palam Pola" | |
| 1997 | Raasi | "Ennachi Thangachi" | |
| 1997 | Love Today | "Enna Azhagu" | |
| 1997 | Once More | "Ooty Malai Beauty" | |
| 1998 | Jolly | "Sema Jolly" | |
| 1998 | Unnudan | "Paalaru Ithu Pathinaaru" | |
| 1999 | Kannodu Kanbathellam | "Iruvathu Vayathu Varai" | |
| 1999 | Niram | "Minnithennum Nakshathrangal" | Malayalam films |
| 1999 | Usthad | "Chil Chil Chil Chilamboli" | Malayalam films |
| 2000 | Priyamaanavale | "Welcome Boys" | |
| 2000 | Narasimham | "Pazhanimalai" | Malayalam film |
| 2000 | Yuvakudu | "Jagada Jagada" | Telugu film |
| 2002 | Virumbugiren | "Enga Ooru Sandhaiyile" | |
| 2004 | Kuthu | "Pothuthaakku" | |
| 2004 | Kadhal Dot Com | "Pachathanni" | |
| 2004 | Leela Mahal Center | "Balamanemo" | Telugu film |
| 2006 | Varalaru | "Ilamai" | |
| 2007 | Aarya | "Chile Chile" | |
| 2007 | Piragu | "Pathinoru Peru Aatam" | |
| 2008 | Silambaattam | "Nalamdhana" | |
| 2010 | Sura | "Naan Nadanthal Athiradi" | |
| 2011 | Kandaen | "Narmada" | |
| 2011 | Osthe | "Neduvaali" | |
| 2012 | Nanda Nanditha | "Salam Namasthey" | |
| 2012 | Podaa Podi | "Love Panlama" | Vijay Award for Best Choreographer |
| 2013 | Kanna Laddu Thinna Aasaiya | "Aasaiye Alai Poley" | |
| 2013 | Moondru Per Moondru Kadal | "Padapadakkudhu Maname" | |
| 2013 | Vanakkam Chennai | "Chennai City Gangster" | |
| 2014 | Ner Ethir | | |
| 2014 | Angusam | "Vaa Maapilae" | |
| 2014 | Aindhaam Thalaimurai Sidha Vaidhiya Sigamani | "Onnuna Rendu" | |
| 2015 | Moone Moonu Varthai | "Ketta News" | |
| 2015 | Moodu Mukkallo Cheppalante | "Newse Mose" | Telugu film |
| 2017 | Anbanavan Asaradhavan Adangadhavan | "Ratham En Ratham" | |
| 2018 | Nagesh Thiraiyarangam | "Vaadi Vaadi" | |
| 2019 | Vantha Rajavathaan Varuven | "Red Cardu" | |

=== Television ===
| Year | Show | Role | Channel | Notes |
|---|---|---|---|---|
| 2022 | Bigg Boss (Tamil season 6) | Contestant | Star Vijay | Evicted Day 49 |
