= Ravikanth (actor) =

Indian Actor (born 1962)

- Born: Ravi Srinivasan; 28 May 1962 (age 64); Tamil Nadu, India
- Occupation: Actor
- Years active: 1987–present

Ravikanth is an Indian actor who has appeared in Tamil language films.

== Career ==
Ravi began his professional career as a sound engineer and when the company closed down, he joined a drama troupe. At the troupe, he became acquainted with Charuhasan who introduced him to Ananthu, an associate of director K. Balachander. Soon after, Ravi was given the stage name of Ravikanth and made his acting debut in Balachander's Manathil Uruthi Vendum (1987). During the period, he also shot for a supporting role in Apoorva Sagodharargal (1989) but his portions were cut owing to the film's length. Ravikanth later moved on to work on television serials, regularly collaborating on K. Balachander's productions including Sahana and Solathan Ninaikiraen.

In the 2000s, Ravikanth has regularly worked on films directed by Venkat Prabhu starting from Saroja (2008). In Venkat Prabhu's comedy drama Goa, Ravikanth portrayed eight different characters and labelled the film as his "big break". He has since appeared in films such as Mankatha and Biriyani (2013) with the director. Some of his films in the 2000s, such as the Premgi-starrer 2010 Bhagyaraj and the Silambarasan-starrer Kettavan were dropped mid-production.

Outside of his film career, Ravikanth owns Reflomats, a business specialising in the production of signs.

== Personal life ==
Earlier media reports had claimed that Ravikanth married actress Ambika in 2000 and divorced her in 2002. However, Ravikanth has publicly denied these claims.

In a July 2024 interview, he clarified that he was never married to Ambika, and that the rumours arose because they frequently acted as husband and wife in films, lived in the same neighbourhood, and often travelled together to shooting locations. Ravikanth stated: "Neither am I married to Ambika nor am I her husband."

He explained that at the time Ambika was married to Premkumar and living in the United States, only travelling to India for film shootings.

== Filmography ==
Year	Film	Role	Notes
1987	Manathil Uruthi Vendum		
1990	Pathimoonam Number Veedu	Rekha's husband	
1994	Chinna Muthu		
1994	Atha Maga Rathiname		
1995	Paattu Vaathiyar	Pechimuthu	
1997	Abhimanyu	Prakash	
1999	Suyamvaram	Wedding guest	
2003	Anjaneya	Police officer	
2008	Saroja	Chettiyar	
2010	Goa	8 characters	
2011	Mankatha	Chettiyar's assistant	
2013	Biriyani	Chandrasekhar	
2015	MGR Sivaji Rajini Kamal	Vanarajan	
2021	Chakra	Dial For Help Board member	
2021	Maanaadu		
2022	Kaathuvaakula Rendu Kaadhal	Khatija's father	
2025	Mrs & Mr	Vidhya's father	

== Television ==
Year	Title	Role	Channel
2003–2004	Sahana		Jaya TV
	Solathan Ninaikiraen		Zee Tamil
2013–2017	Vamsam	Sivaram	Sun TV
2023–2024	Kizhakku Vaasal	Ravi	Vijay Television
2023–2024	Malar	Vishwanathan	Sun TV
2025-present	Annamalai Kudumbam	Venkadesan	Zee Tamil
