= Pavalakkodi (2003 film) =

Pavalakodi
- Directed by: Ram - CP Saravanan
- Produced by: CP Sivakumar
- Starring: Vijay Sarathy; Robert; Paval
- Cinematography: KV Suresh
- Edited by: Lancy Mohan
- Music by: Sirpy
- Release date: 20 March 2003
- Running time: 140 minutes
- Country: India
- Language: Tamil

Pavalakodi is a 2003 Tamil language drama film directed by Ram - CP Saravanan. The film stars Vijay Sarathy, Robert and Paval. The film was released on 20 March 2003.

== Cast ==
- Vijay Sarathy as Shiva
- Robert as Robert
- Paval as Pavalakkodi
- Anu Mohan as Mohan
- Nirosha as Baby
- Shaama as Shaamam
- Crane Manohar
- Crazy Kumar

Uncredited

- Chaams as Shyam
- Madhan Bob

== Production ==
Vijay Sarathy, the host of Sun TV's Neengal Ketta Padal, made his film debut with this film.

== Soundtrack ==
Pavalakodi

Soundtrack album by Sirpy
- Released: 12 February 2003
- Recorded: 2003
- Genre: Feature film soundtrack
- Length: 28:47
- Producer: Sirpy

The film score and the soundtrack were composed by Sirpy.

Track	Song	Singer(s)	Lyrics	Duration
1	"Kannaal Paarthathum"	Srinivas	Kabilan	4:38
2	"Azhage Un Gnyabagam"	O. S. Arun	Palani Bharathi	6:54
3	"Spencer Plaza Naduvil"	Tippu	Palani Bharathi	6:12
4	"Andaman Theeve"	Karthik, Mathangi	Snehan	5:15
5	"Naan Un Pinnadi"	Tippu, Reshmi	Palani Bharathi	5:02

== Critical reception ==
A critic from Sify wrote that "For those who have missed seeing the Hollywood comedy There Is something About Mary then Pavalakodi is sure to entertain you". A critic from Chennai Online wrote that "If you've missed the original, here is your second chance". Screen wrote "The film drags on and the only saving grace is a few comic scenes by Robert and his partner. Sirpy gives two good songs but sadly it is not picturised well".
