= Paattu Vaathiyar =

- DVD cover
- Directed by: T. P. Gajendran
- Written by: S. P. Mathivanan; S. Gajendrakumar (dialogues)
- Screenplay by: T. P. Gajendran
- Story by: Ashok Kumar
- Produced by: K. Nalluswamy
- Starring: Ramesh Aravind; Ranjitha
- Cinematography: Baby Philips
- Edited by: Rajkeerthi
- Music by: Ilaiyaraaja
- Production company: Sree Navalady Creations
- Release date: 22 July 1995
- Running time: 140 minutes
- Country: India
- Language: Tamil

Paattu Vaathiyar (transl. Music teacher) is a 1995 Indian Tamil language romantic drama film directed by T. P. Gajendran. The film stars Ramesh Aravind and Ranjitha, with Jaishankar, Senthil, Raveendran, Ravikanth, Vetri Vigneshwar, Kovai Sarala and Raghavi playing supporting roles. It was released on 22 July 1995, and did not do well at the box office.

== Plot ==
Pandian is a wealthy man in his village and the village chief, he built a school in the past. His daughter Deivanai is a joyful woman, she has more power than the school headmaster and all the teachers work under her command.

The villagers follow very orthodox customs: only those from the village can get married together and the village women are not allowed to leave the village.

Ramesh is a music teacher, he comes from the city to teach music lessons at Pandian's school. At first, when taking classes, the students tease Ramesh and they don't respect him. Ramesh slowly makes them like music. Ramesh gets into a fight with Deivanai, which leads to an ego clash between the pair. The hatred turns into love, they both fall in love secretly. In the meantime, Pechimuthu, Pandian's nephew, is back from jail after an honour killing.

In the past, the village girl Karpagam and Vetri who was from another village fell in love with each other. When their relationship had come into the limelight, Pandian punished Karpagam: being stripped in front of the villagers. But her lover tried to save her from this humiliation, and Pechimuthu brutally killed him. Afterwards, Karpagam became mentally ill and Pechimuthu was sent to jail.

Maarappan, Karpagam's brother, wants to take revenge on Pandian and Pechimuthu and he waits for the right opportunity. One day, Maarappan learns of Ramesh and Deivanai's love. What transpires later forms the crux of the story.

== Cast ==
- Ramesh Aravind as Ramesh
- Ranjitha as Deivanai
- Jaishankar as Pandian
- Senthil as Pulipandi
- Raveendar as Maarappan
- Ravikanth as Pechimuthu
- Vetri Vigneshwar as Vetri
- Kovai Sarala as Pulipandi's wife
- Raghavi as Karpagam
- Kumarimuthu as washerman
- Kula Deivam V. R. Rajagopal as Headmaster
- Gajendra Kumar
- M. R. Krishnamurthy as Tamil Teacher
- Pasi Narayanan as Science Teacher
- Oru Viral Krishna Rao as Swamy
- Marthandan
- Thavakalai Chittibabu as Ice Cream Seller
- K. B. Kumar
- N. Ramadurai
- Malliswari
- Uma Maheswari
- Maami Jayalakshmi
- Sumathi
- Baby Thejesh Kumar Gourabathini
- Baboos
- T. P. Gajendran in a cameo appearance

== Soundtrack ==
The soundtrack was composed by Ilaiyaraaja with lyrics by Vaali.

Song	Singer(s)	Duration
"Muthamendraal Ennavendru"	K. J. Yesudas, Sujatha Mohan	5:10
"Neethaane Naaldhorum" (duet)	K. J. Yesudas, Swarnalatha	5:09
"Neethaane Naaldhorum" (solo)	K. J. Yesudas	5:17
"Oh Maari Poo Maari"	K. J. Yesudas, Minmini	4:53
"Sangeedhatha Valarkaveanaam"	K. J. Yesudas	5:18
"Solai Malarea Nenjai"	K. J. Yesudas	5:06
"Paadura"	Ilaiyaraaja	3:01
"Paadura"	K. J. Yesudas	4:49
