= Madhu (2006 film) =

2006 film by K.Thennarasu

- CD Cover
- Directed by: K. Thennarasu
- Written by: K. Thennarasu
- Produced by: 'Villupuram' Thangam Sekar
- Starring: Jithan Ramesh; Priyamani; Ashish Vidyarthi
- Cinematography: M. N. Rahim Babu
- Edited by: B. Lenin (Supervisor); S. Satish-J. N. Harsha
- Music by: Ilaiyaraaja
- Production company: Golden Media
- Release date: 12 May 2006
- Running time: 135 minutes
- Country: India
- Language: Tamil

Madhu is a 2006 Indian Tamil-language romantic drama film written and directed by K. Thennarasu, starring Jithan Ramesh, Priyamani and Ashish Vidyarthi. The film was released on 12 May 2006.

== Plot ==
Madhukrishnan likes to roam on a bike. Mercy and Esther are friends and hostel mates. Mercy believes in Jesus and is kind to others. Esther is bold, well dressed, and teases everyone. One day, when Esther teases Madhu, he kisses her publicly. Madhu falls in love with Mercy at first sight when she rescued a puppy from the rain. Madhu often meets Mercy. He comes to the hostel and expresses his love to her, but she denies it. After examination, Mercy goes to her hometown Mahi, and Madhu follows her. Her father Siluvai owes to bring up his daughter to a good position. Madhu becomes Siluvai's favourite. Esther enters the scene with a much-changed character. Siluvai learns of their love affair, and his decision forms the rest of the story. In the end, Madhu and Mercy fall from a hill and die.

== Cast ==
- Jithan Ramesh as Madhukrishnan alias Madhu
- Priyamani as Mercy
- Ashish Vidyarthi as Siluvai
- Vivek as Madhan
- Jahnavi as Esther
- Rekha as Jennifer
- Seema
- Nizhalgal Ravi
- Thalaivasal Vijay
- Cell Murugan as Police Inspector

== Production ==
Three songs were shot at Thiruvananthapuram.

== Soundtrack ==
Soundtrack was composed by Ilaiyaraaja.

Song title	Singers	Lyricist
"Dum Irundha Munnale Vaa"	Karthik, Naveen, Ranjith	Na. Muthukumar
"Ketkavillaya"	Ilaiyaraaja, Manjari	Na. Muthukumar
"Indha Ulagil"	Pop Shalini	Muthulingam
"Nilavai Sutri"	Tippu	Vaali
"Immathundu Manasu"	Malathy, Ranjith & Chorus	Vaali

== Reception ==
A critic from Sify wrote, "To call the venture childish would be an understatement. All said and suffered we feel sorry for 'Jithan' Ramesh and Priya Mani". A critic from Rediff.com wrote, "Give this one a miss". Malathi Rangarajan of The Hindu wrote, "The screenplay meanders without grip, and the tale leaves you untouched because at no point do you empathise with the characters." Cinesouth wrote, "Despite having a strong support like Ilayaraja’s music and B Lenin’s editing, the film falls short because of the weak screenplay". Malini Mannath of Chennai Online wrote "It's no doubt a plot slightly different from the routine ones, but the director lets go the chance of making it a meaningful film. [..] It does keep the audience fairly engaged for a time, the suspense element 'will-they-won't-they' keeping it going. But then the films tends to lag in the second half and when it's time to bring a suitable ending to the story, it's like the director chickens out, opting for a cliff-edge (literally) climax".
