= Aathi Narayana =

2012 Indian film by Vetrivendhan

- Directed by: J. Vetrivendhan
- Written by: J. Vetrivendhan
- Produced by: S. Balaji
- Starring: Kajan; Meera Jasmine; Karunas
- Cinematography: R. Selva
- Music by: Srikanth Deva
- Production company: Box Office Productions
- Release date: 27 April 2012
- Country: India
- Language: Tamil

Aathi Narayana is a 2012 Indian Tamil language drama film written and directed by J. Vetrivendhan and starring Kajan and Meera Jasmine. The film was released on 27 April 2012 after many delays, alongside another long delayed film Leelai.

== Cast ==
- Kajan as Aathi Narayana
- Meera Jasmine as Laila
- Karunas as Aslam Muhammed Rafiq Salam
- Yogita
- Mayilsamy as Aathi Narayana's friend
- Alex as Roadside shop owner
- Vijay Babu as Aathi Narayana's father
- Madhan Bob as Ramkumar, Psychiatric Department Head
- Rajyalakshmi as Aathi Narayana's mother
- Kottachi as Aslam's friend
- Bayilvan Ranganathan as Police Officer
- Nellai Siva as Police Officer
- Suruli Manohar as Police Officer
- Meesai Rajendranath as Police Inspector
- Boys Rajan as Laila's father

== Production ==
Newcomer Kajan, who previously worked as a computer engineer, made his debut through this film. Many leading actresses were signed but refused to act before Meera Jasmine, who was shooting for a film in Hyderabad agreed to feature. The film also stars Bangalore model Yogita and Karunas and was initially titled as Deivamagan - though the title was changed after pressure from the makers of an old film with the same name. As of late 2008, the first schedule of the film was complete.

== Soundtrack ==
The music was composed by Srikanth Deva.

No.	Song	Singers	Lyrics
1	"Idhuthana Kadhal"	Haricharan	Snehan
2	"Happy New Year"	S. P. B. Charan, Preethi Samyuktha	Viveka
3	"Kanna Nee"	Sadhana Sargam	Kabilan
4	"Karuppayee"	Silambarasan, Roshini	Kabilan
5	"Twinkle Twinkle"	Karthik, Suchitra	Palani Bharathi

== Release ==
The film was eventually released on 27 April 2012 across Tamil Nadu with little publicity alongside Leelai and Padam Parthu Kadhai Sol.
