= Vincent Selva =

Indian film director

- Other name: R. K. Vincent Selva
- Occupations: Director, screenwriter
- Years active: 1998–present

Vincent Selva is an Indian film director and screenwriter associated with the Tamil film industry.

== Career ==
Vincent Selva got associated with film scene in the 1990s. He made his film debut as a director through the romantic thriller film Priyamudan starring Vijay and Kausalya. It was a hit at box office and had been remade in various languages. In 1999, he released his second film, Iraniyan, starred Murali and Meena in lead roles.

In 2002, he directed Youth a film starring Vijay, which was well received by critics and audiences. He was signed on by producer Keyaar to make a film titled Enna Peyar Veikalaam featuring Karthik in the lead role. Despite travelling to Pollachi for the shoot, the actor refused to emerge from his hotel room, and following an extended period of confusion, the film was called off. He worked on Khakee, a police thriller with Sarathkumar in the lead role during 2006, but the film was shelved. Despite attempts to restart the venture in 2008, the film did not finish production. In 2005, he directed the Tamil version of the Hindi film, Gayab to Tamil titled, Jithan. The movie met with commercial success. After the film, he directed the same actor Jithan Ramesh in Madurai Veeran (2007), the remake of the Telugu film Nuvvu Nenu (2002), but it was received negative reviews. Perumal (2009), Thulli Vilayadu (2013) and Inga Enna Solluthu (2014) are other releases.

In 2016, he made a comeback with the sequel of Jithan as a writer and the movie titled Jithan 2 was a major setback. The next movie, Virumandikkum Sivanandikkum once again received mixed reviews.

== Filmography ==
Year	Film	Credited as		Language	Notes
Year	Film	Director	Writer	Language	Notes
1998	Priyamudan	Yes	Yes	Tamil	
1999	Iraniyan	Yes	Screenplay	Tamil	
2002	Youth	Yes	Screenplay	Tamil	
2005	Jithan	Yes	Screenplay	Tamil	credited as R. K. Vincent Selva Remake films; original story writer not credited
2007	Madurai Veeran	Yes	Screenplay	Tamil	credited as R. K. Vincent Selva Remake films; original story writer not credited
2009	Perumal	Yes	Screenplay	Tamil	
2013	Thulli Vilayadu	Yes	Story	Tamil	
2014	Inga Enna Solluthu	Yes	No	Tamil	credited as V. Selva
2016	Jithan 2	No	Yes	Tamil	
2016	Virumandikkum Sivanandikkum	Yes	Yes	Tamil	
2024	Kummattikali	Yes	Yes	Malayalam	credited as R. K. Vincent Selva
