= Nireekshana (2023 film) =

- Promotional poster
- Directed by: Vamsee Krishna Malla
- Written by: Vamsee Krishna Malla
- Produced by: P. Rajan
- Starring: Sai Ronak; Ena Saha; Shraddha Das; Ramesh Choudary
- Cinematography: Ravi V.
- Edited by: Nandamuri Hari
- Music by: Anand
- Production company: Take Ok Creations
- Release date: 27 July 2023 (Tamil YouTube release)
- Running time: 116 minutes
- Country: India
- Language: Telugu

Nireekshana ( transl. Observation/Examination) is a 2023 Indian Telugu-language romantic thriller film directed by Vamsee Krishna Malla and starring Sai Ronak, Ena Saha, Shraddha Das, and Ramesh Choudary.

== Plot ==
Ashok commenced his enterprise as a procurer and established a reputation as a trustworthy individual inside exclusive circles. He sends his girlfriend to Daniel that night, unaware that she will be horribly murdered. Goutham, the proprietor of a small restaurant, encounters an attractive woman named Meena on the roadside, who is seeking a ride and makes a proposal to him during their initial meeting.

== Cast ==
- Sai Ronak as Gautham
- Ena Saha as Megha
- Shraddha Das as Police Officer
- Ramesh Choudary as David Daniel Raj
- Ajay Ghosh as Ashok
- Brahmaji as Police Officer
- Viva Harsha as Gautham's friend
- Madhunandan as Gautham’s friend
- Sana as Rathnamala
- Nikkita Anil Kumar as Megha's sister
- Venu Yeldandi as Cheenu
- Prabhas Sreenu

== Production ==
The film began production in mid-2019, and the story is based on a true incident that took place in Goa. Ramesh Choudary was initially cast as the film's hero, but the director opted that he play the film's antagonist after being satisfied with his eyes. The film marked his debut negative role. The film was reported to be a Telugu-Tamil bilingual with the Tamil version titled Miratchi. The climax scene was shot nonstop for three days with only a one-hour gap in between.

== Soundtrack ==
Nireekshana

Soundtrack album by Anand
- Released: 2020
- Recorded: 2019
- Genre: Feature film soundtrack
- Length: 4:59
- Language: Telugu
- Label: Aditya Music

Anand chronology
Coffee With My Wife (2013)	Nireekshana (2020)

The music was composed by Anand of Mantra (2007) fame. The audio release function of the Tamil version took place on 9 February 2020 in Chennai with Jiiva in attendance.

All lyrics are written by Chandrabose.

Nireekshana
No.	Title	Singer(s)	Length
1.	"Gallu Gallu"	Sravana Bhargavi, Anand	3:57
2.	"Kalalu Yenno"	Sunitha	1:02
Total length:			4:59

Miratchi
No.	Title	Singer(s)	Length
1.	"En Kaadale"	Vandana, Santosh	4:30
2.	"Jallu Jalluna"	Chinnaponnu	4:06
3.	"Somebody Says"	Mansi, Noel Sean, Anand	4:12
4.	"Kanavugalil"	Vandana	3:48
5.	"Ratchasaaa"	Anand, Roll Rida, Priya	4:15
Total length:			20:51

== Release ==
The film was initially supposed to be released in 2020. The Tamil dubbed version Miratchi had a direct release via YouTube in 2023.
