= Never Escape =

- Theatrical release poster
- Directed by: Dsri Aravind Deva Raj
- Written by: Dsri Aravind Deva Raj
- Produced by: Nansi Flora Selvadhas
- Starring: Robert; Adhi Prithvi
- Cinematography: Santhosh Kumar Sj
- Edited by: Guru Pradeep
- Music by: Charan Kumar
- Production company: Royal B Productions
- Release date: 19 April 2024
- Country: India
- Language: Tamil

Never Escape is a 2024 Indian Tamil-language survival thriller film written and directed by Dsri Aravind Deva Raj. The film stars Robert and Adhi Prithvi. The film was produced by Nansi Flora Selvadhas under the banner of Royal B Productions.. And the film was distributed by Phoenix Fim Corporation.

== Cast ==
- Robert as theatre owner
- Adhi Prithvi as Harish
- Harshini Harres Prabu as Mithra
- Kavi J Sundharam as CM
- Uvais Khan as Rex
- Raji Raze as Sara
- Jebin John as Mariyan
- Praneshvar Manikandan as vlogger
- Sasti Pranesh as cameraman

== Production ==
The film noted debuted to the director Dsri Aravind Deva Raj.

== Reception ==
Manigandan KR of Times Now rated two point five out of five and wrote that "In other words, this strange concoction of a horror thriller and a psycho drama has some moments that thrill you." Thinaboomi critic wrote that "All in all, 'Never Escape' can be enjoyed once."

Maalai Malar critic rated two out of five stars and stated that "Dance master Robert, who plays the hero in the film, has played a different getup. Realizing the character, he handles the psycho killer character with finesse in his every move."
