= Ongala Podanum Sir =

2019 Indian comedy film

- Theatrical release poster
- Directed by: RL Ravi & Sreejith Vijayan
- Written by: Siva Anchal, Sajith S. Ishaque
- Screenplay by: Murugan Manthiram
- Produced by: Manoj Perinthalmanna
- Starring: Jithan Ramesh; Sanuja Somnadh; Joniha Doda; Anu Nair; Parijitha Singa; Vaishaly
- Cinematography: S Selva Kumar
- Edited by: Vishnu Narayanan
- Music by: Rejimon
- Production companies: Shadowfox productions and zigma films
- Release date: 13 September 2019
- Running time: 100 minutes
- Country: India
- Language: Tamil

Ongala Podanum Sir (transl. I want to kill you, sir) is a 2019 Indian Tamil-language comedy horror film directed by R. L. Ravi and Sreejith Vijayan. It stars Jithan Ramesh in the lead role alongside five debutant actresses. Featuring music composed by Rejimon, the film began production in mid-2018 was released on 13 September 2019.

== Cast ==
- Jithan Ramesh as David
- Sanuja Somanadh as Ranjitha
- Jonita Doda as Neha
- Parijitha Singa as Maya
- Vaishali Seth as Nikki
- Anu Nair as Lizzy
- Manobala as Chairman Kasthuriman
- Kalloori Vinoth as Vinoth
- Mippu as Mippu
- Gajesh Nagesh as Ravi
- Raja Rani Pandian as Principal
- Poraali Dileepan as School SI
- Balaji as Teacher
- Manimaran as Advocate Kumaraswamy
- Sanju as Young David

== Production ==
The adult comedy film began production in late 2018, and was completed by January 2019. Directors Ravi and Sreejith opted to name the film after a popular dialogue by Nayanthara's character in Naanum Rowdy Dhaan (2015). The makers cast five new actresses in the film alongside Jithan Ramesh, who was making a comeback after a brief sabbatical.

== Soundtrack ==
The film's soundtrack was composed by Reji Mon and Lyrics penned by Murugan Manthiram.

- "Vennira Irave" – Naresh Iyer, Reji Mon
- "Kela Kela Kelappu" – Anthony Daasan, Arya, Archana, Vishnuvardhan

== Release ==
The film had a low profile opening across Tamil Nadu on 13 September 2019. In its review, The New Indian Express gave a negative impression and wrote the film was "a god-awful vulgarfest".
