= Kalabhavan Rahman =

Indian actor

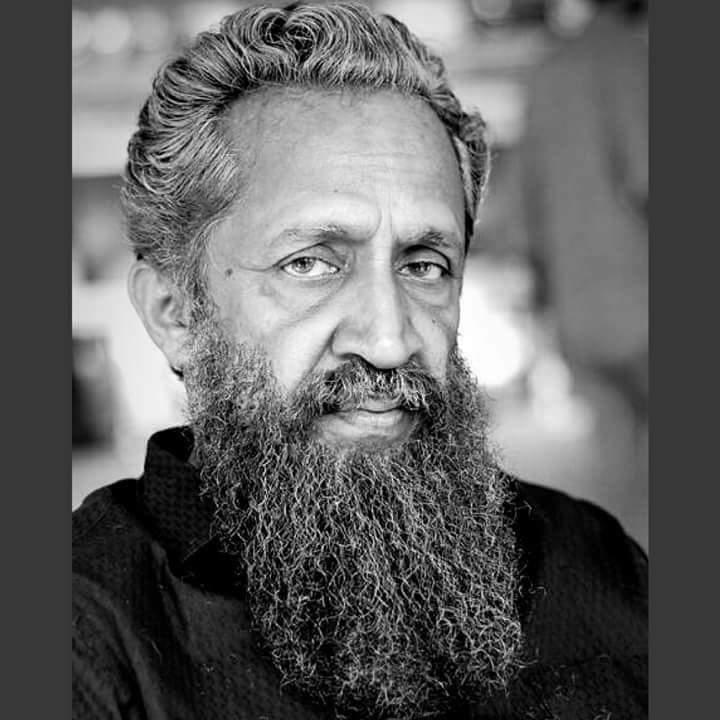
- Born: Rahman; Aluva, Kerala, India
- Education: UC College, Aluva, Kerala
- Years active: 1986–present
- Spouse: Rejula
- Children: 2

Kalabhavan Rahman is a Malayalam film actor in Kerala.

== Career ==
Rahman started his film acting career in 1986 with a unimportant role. Reghunath Paleri directed the title Onnu Muthal Poojyam Vare. He hails from Aluva in Kerala. Rahman is alumnus of U.C.College, Aluva. He currently resides at Ernakulam and is married to Rejula Rahman. The couple has two kids, Fahim Rahman and Thanvi Rahman. He is active in the Malayalam film industry for the last 30 years. He is an alumnus of Cochin Kalabhavan. Rahman was one among the creator associates of the Kalabhavan mimicry troop along with Siddique, Lal, Anzar, K.S. Prasad and Varkichan, among others.

== Filmography ==
=== Films ===
Year	Title	Role	Notes
1986	Onnu Muthal Poojyam Vare	Icecream Parlor Waiter	
1989	Douthyam	Gang Member	
1990	Nagarangalil Chennu Raparkam	Kunjappu	
1997	Junior Mandrake	Vakkachan	
1997	Nagarapuraanam	Bhadran	
1998	Mangalya Pallakku	Panikkar	
2001	Jeevan Mashai	Kishore	
2009	Shudharil Shudhan		
2010	Canvas	Uliyanoor Unni Asari	
2012	Josettante Hero	Shukkoor	
2012	Thappana	Police Constable	
2013	Rebecca Uthup Kizhakkemala	Thomachan	
2013	Crocodile Love Story	Opposition leader	
2013	101 Chodyangal		
2013	Drishyam	Bus Conductor	
2014	Darboni		
2014	Manglish	Driver Rahman	
2015	Nirnnayakam	Interview Candidate	
2015	32aam Adhyayam 23aam Vaakyam	Kappyar	
2015	Vishwasam... Athallae Ellaam	Sali's Father	
2016	Anyarku Praveshanamilla	Ratheesh	
2016	Pa Va	Police Officer	
2016	Welcome to Central Jail	Vishwanath's Assistant	
2016	Daffedar	Alias	
2017	Sakhavu	Tea Shop Owner	
2017	Ente Kallu Pencil		
2018	Samakalikam		Short film
2018	Parole	Chandran	
2018	Chalakkudikkaran Changathi	Sasi	
2019	Kuttymama	Taxi driver	
2023	Pappachan Olivilanu	Joseph	
2024	Once Upon a Time in Kochi		
