= Perumal (film) =

- Theatrical release poster
- Directed by: Vincent Selva
- Written by: Story & Dialogues: G. K. Balakumaran
- Screenplay by: Vincent Selva
- Produced by: P. Shanmugam
- Starring: Sundar C Namitha; Meenakshi
- Cinematography: Banu Murugan
- Edited by: K. M. Riyas
- Music by: Srikanth Deva
- Distributed by: Cirussti
- Release date: 13 February 2009
- Country: India
- Language: Tamil

Perumal is a 2009 Indian Tamil-language action film directed by Vincent Selva. The film stars Sundar C, Namitha, and Meenakshi. The music was composed by Srikanth Deva. The film was released on 13 February 2009.

== Plot ==
The film begins in a hospital where a mafia is involved in adulterating drugs. A junior doctor Alamu manages to stumble upon their antisocial act. To safeguard themselves, the gang sets out to wipe out Alamu. She meets Perumal, a petty thief who does the job of recovering loans for an agency. He eventually vows to protect Alamu from her distress by putting an end to the gang and their atrocities.

== Cast ==
- Sundar C as Perumal
- Namitha as Saroja
- Meenakshi as Dr. Alamu
- Vivek as Idithangi/Indrasena Reddy
- Kota Srinivasa Rao
- Sudhir
- Ilavarasu
- Singamuthu
- Swaminathan as Police Inspector
- Dhamu
- Thennavan
- Cell Murugan as Idithangi's follower
- Thambi Ramaiah
- T. P. Gajendran
- Crane Manohar
- Muthukaalai
- Scissor Manohar
- Kadhal Arun Kumar
- Siva Narayana Murthy as Police Inspector
- Kaajal Pasupathi as Idithangi's wife
- Bava Lakshmanan
- Munnar Ramesh
- Jasper
- Besant Ravi
- Raviraj as Doctor

== Soundtrack ==
The soundtrack features was composed by Srikanth Deva and lyrics were written by Kabilan. It includes a remix of "Kadhal Vaibhogame" from Suvarilladha Chiththirangal (1979), composed by Gangai Amaran. The audio launch was held on 18 July 2008.

Track listing
No.	Title	Singer(s)	Length
1.	"Enna Enna Seyyapporae"	Sumangali	5:38
2.	"Yedhaachum Sollividuven"	Anuradha Sriram	4:27
3.	"Yaen Kedutha"	Benny Dayal, Surmukhi Raman	4:40
4.	"Enna Enna"	Asha Ramesh	4:43
5.	"Kadhal Vaibogamae"	S. Janaki, Arivunidhi	4:03
Total length:			23:31

== Critical reception ==
Pavithra Srinivasan of Rediff.com wrote, "Apparently, the makers decided that nothing much was needed to make this into a complete movie because there's nothing else." Sify wrote, "Technically the long in the making film has too many continuity problems. If you have seen one Sundar.C film, you've seen them all!". The New Indian Express wrote, "A film which seems to have the most mediocre script the actor has got himself into, the pedestrian treatment not making it any better". Cinesouth appreciated the film's comedy and anti-drug message, but criticised every other aspect of it.
