= Pappachan Olivilanu =

2023 Malayalam film by Sinto Sunny

- Theatrical release poster
- Directed by: Sinto Sunny
- Written by: Sinto Sunny
- Produced by: Thomas Thiruvalla
- Starring: Saiju Kurup; Darshana s Nair; Srinda; Aju Varghese; Vijayaraghavan; Jagadish; Alexander Prasanth
- Cinematography: Sreejith Nair
- Edited by: Rathin Radhakrishnan
- Music by: Ouseppachan
- Production company: Thomas Thiruvalla Films
- Distributed by: Thomas Thiruvalla Films
- Release date: 4 August 2023
- Running time: 134 minutes
- Country: India
- Language: Malayalam

Pappachan Olivilanu (transl. Pappachan is Absconding) is a 2023 Indian Malayalam-language comedy film written and directed by Sinto Sunny. The film stars Saiju Kurup as the title character, alongside Aju Varghese, Vijayaraghavan, Darshana Sudarshan Nair, Jagadish, Srinda and Alexander Prasanth. Set in a hilly village named Mamalakunnu, the plot follows Pappachan, a farmer and a jeep driver who is not highly regarded among the villagers.

Principal photography began in January 2023 near Kothamangalam. The music was composed by Ouseppachan, while the cinematography and editing were handled by Sreejith Nair and Rathin Radhakrishnan.

Initially set to release on 28 July 2023, Pappachan Olivilanu was released in theatres on 4 August 2023 to mixed reviews from critics.

== Cast ==
- Saiju Kurup as Puthenveetil Pappachan alias Kaduva Pappachan
- Vijayaraghavan as Meesha Mathachan, Pappachan's father
- Aju Varghese as Benny, Cicily's husband and Pappachan's friend
- Jagadish as Adv. Pauly, Cicily's brother in law
- Johny Antony as Lalappan
- Kottayam Nazeer as Xavier, Pappachan's brother in law
- Alexander Prasanth as CPO Jameskutty
- Darshana Sudarshan Nair as Cicily, Pappachan's ex-lover & Benny's wife
- Srinda as Reena, Pappachan's wife
- Jolly Chirayath as Eliamma
- Shivaji Guruvayoor as Father Geevarghese
- Kalabhavan Rahman as Joseph, Cicily's father
- Jibu Jacob as Inspector Sebastian Paul
- Shiju Tom as SI Hakeem
- Babu Annoor as Forest officer
- Gowri as BFO (Note: BFO denotes Beat Forest Officer) Aswathy Ramachandran
- Sharan S. Raj as BFO Vinu Sathyan
- Arun Krishnamurthy as BFO Vishnu
- Eldho Raju as BFO Aby Thomas
- Ajo Machingal as BFO
- Kudassanad Kanakam as Magistrate
- Challenger V. Aravind as Prosecutor
- Kavitha Baiju as Kunjumol
- Sona Pooppara as Christina
- Jordi Poonjar as Thankachan
- Arun Soul as Joekuttan
- Shaijo Adimaly as Lottery Sabu
- Hyder Ali as Cook Abu
- Hareesh Pengan as Forest watcher
- Shamnas as Karumadi Madhu
- Raffi as Ali Akbar, a videographer
- Mudiyan Manikuttan as video assistant
- Chandrashekharan Koodallur as Pavithran
- Shalbin as Sikander
- Shaheer Muhammad as Broker
- Shiju Madakkara

== Production ==
=== Filming ===
Principal photography commenced in Nadukani near Kothamangalam on 18 January 2023. The switch-on was performed by Jibu Jacob, while the first clap was given by Kalabhavan Rahman. The filming was completed near Kuttampuzha, Bhoothathankettu and Neriamangalam.

== Soundtrack ==
Pappachan Olivilanu

Soundtrack album by Ouseppachan
- Released: 2023
- Genre: Feature film soundtrack
- Length: 16:12
- Language: Malayalam
- Label: Manorama Music

Ouseppachan chronology
Signal Man - 1971 (2023)	Pappachan Olivilanu (2023)	Route No. 17 (2023)

The songs and background score were composed by Ouseppachan, while the lyrics were written by B. K. Harinarayanan and Sinto Sunny.

Track listing
No.	Title	Lyrics	Singer(s)	Length
1.	"Muthukkuda Maanam"	B. K. Harinarayanan	M.G. Sreekumar, Sujatha Mohan	4:47
2.	"Kayyethum Dhoorath"	Sinto Sunny	Vineeth Sreenivasan	3:14
3.	"Punya Maha Sannidhe"	Sinto Sunny	Vaikom Vijayalakshmi	3:27
4.	"Pappacha Pappacha"	Sinto Sunny	Richukuttan, Lakshya Kiran, Aadhya Nair, Mukthitha Murukesh, Sagarika, Saiju Kurup	3:11
5.	"Thirubalithaarayil"	Sinto Sunny	Deva Reghuchandran Nair	1:33
Total length:				16:12

== Release ==
=== Theatrical ===
The film was originally scheduled to be released on 28 July 2023. Later, the date was postponed, and the film was released on 4 August 2023.

=== Home media ===
The digital rights of the film have been obtained by Saina Play. The online streaming began on 14 September 2023.

== Reception ==
=== Critical response ===
Swathi P. Ajith of Onmanorama wrote "The movie's humour serves as a compelling element that holds it together, leading the audience to overlook its drawbacks." Anandu Suresh of The Indian Express gave 0.5 out of 5 stars and wrote "Pappachan Olivilaanu is yet another Malayalam film that delves into the realm of experimentation, pushing the boundaries to see 'how far is too far', thus testing the patience of viewers to the very limit."
