= Okate Life =

- Theatrical release poster
- Directed by: M. Venkat
- Written by: Satish Bandoji
- Produced by: Narayan Ram; Dwarakanth Reddy
- Starring: Ramesh Choudary; Shruti Yugal
- Cinematography: D. Yadhagiri; Romti Vijay Kumar
- Music by: Songs: Amresh Ganesh; Score: Sunil Kashyap
- Production company: Lord Venkateswara Films
- Release date: 3 May 2019
- Country: India
- Language: Telugu

Okate Life (transl. Only one life) is a 2019 Indian Telugu-language romantic thriller film directed by M. Venkat and starring Ramesh Choudary and Shruti Yugal.

== Premise ==
The film is about Blue Whale and how youngsters are addicted to technology and care less for human emotions.

== Cast ==
- Ramesh Choudary as Ram
- Shruti Yugal as Charu
- Suman as ACP Mahindar
- Rishi as Prem
- Disha as Priya
- Venu Yeldandi as Vicky
- Jabardasth Bobby as Suresh

== Production ==
The film began production in 2018. The film marks Ramesh Choudary's return to Telugu cinema after a fourteen-year gap. The trailer was released in the presence of Minister T. Harish Rao.

== Soundtrack ==
Okate Life

Soundtrack album by Amresh Ganesh Background Score: Sunil Kashyap
- Released: 2018
- Recorded: 2018
- Genre: Feature film soundtrack
- Length: 17:54
- Language: Telugu
- Label: iDream Music

Amresh Ganesh chronology
| Sathru (2019) | Okate Life (2018) | En Kaadhali Scene Podura (2019) |

Sunil Kashyap chronology
| Rogue (2017) | Okate Life (2018) | Bewars (2018) |

The songs were composed by Amresh Ganesh in his Telugu debut, and the score was composed by Sunil Kashyap.

Track listing
| No. | Title | Lyrics | Singer(s) | Length |
|---|---|---|---|---|
| 1. | "Dub Dub Dabbu" | Viswa | Sarath Santhosh | 4:09 |
| 2. | "Em Maya Chesave" | Sathish Bandoji | Manasa, Amresh | 5:47 |
| 3. | "Whatsapp Baby" | Bhashya Sree | Suchitra | 4:21 |
| 4. | "Ohh Meri Dhimtak Nari" | Sathish Bandoji | Suchitra, Tippu | 3:37 |
| Total length: | | | | 17:54 |

== Release ==
The film was initially scheduled to release on 22 August 2018 and later 8 February 2019.
