= Thavam (2019 film) =

Indian movie

- Film poster
- Directed by: R. Vijay Anand; A. R. Suriyan
- Written by: R. Vijay Anand; A. R. Suriyan
- Produced by: Vasi Asif
- Starring: Vasi Ashif; Pooja Shree; Seeman
- Music by: Srikanth Deva
- Production company: Ashif Film International
- Release date: 8 November 2019
- Country: India
- Language: Tamil

Thavam (transl. Penance) is a 2019 film co-directed by R. Vijay Anand and A. R. Suriyan, both of whom directed Vilayattu Aarambam. The film stars newcomers Vasi Ashif, Pooja Shree, and Seeman in the lead roles. The film released on 8 November.

== Plot ==
The story is about how three different people - Murugan (Vasi Ashif), Akila (Pooja Shree), and Natesan (Seeman) - come together. There is a subplot of love between Murugan and Akila.

== Cast ==
- Vasi Ashif as Murugan
- Pooja Shree as Akila
- Seeman as Natesan, Murugan's father
- R. Vijay Anand as Siva Anna
- A. R. Suriyan
- Bose Venkat as Vedagiri
- Pandi as Ayyappan
- Singampuli as Caterer
- Santhana Bharathi as MD
- Cool Suresh
- Vengal Rao as Fashion Babu

== Production ==
After a six-year hiatus, Seeman was roped in to play the lead roles in Thavam alongside debutantes Vasi and Pooja Shree. He reprises his role as a farmer rights activist from Nagaraja Cholan MA, MLA .

== Soundtrack ==
Srikanth Deva composed the songs and sang one song. The audio was released on 4 December 2019.

Song title	Lyricist	Singers
"Enna Enna Azhagu"	Mayil	Karunguil James, Hema Ambika
"Sandiyare"	Mayil	Chitti, Bhagyashree
"Oore Kondattam"	Indumathi Pakirisamy	Guru Ayyadurai, Suren Sekaran, G. Ebi, Reshmi, Varanya Srikanth, Sashiya Srikanth
"Kaadhalil Vizhunthen"	Srikanth Deva	Srikanth Deva, V. Shinee
"Vaa Nee"	Govind - Ezhilvendan	Suren Sekaran, Suseela Madan, G. Ebi, Jo Pappa
"Varama Nee"	Srikanth Deva	Deva

== Release ==
The film released to negative reviews. The Times of India gave the film 1.5 out of 5 stars and wrote that "The film is also a tad long and tests our patience after a point". The reviewer criticized the comedy scenes, unengaging screenplay, songs, and emotional scenes. Maalaimalar criticized the length of the film. Dinamalar praised the performances of the lead cast.
