= Jithan 2 =

2014 Tamil horror comedy film by Rahul Paramahamsa

- Directed by: Rahul Paramahamsa
- Written by: Vincent Selva
- Produced by: Rahul Paramahamsa
- Starring: Jithan Ramesh; Srushti Dange
- Cinematography: Suresh Kumar
- Edited by: Maruthi Krish
- Music by: Srikanth Deva; Yeshwanth Raja
- Production company: RPM cinemas
- Release date: 8 April 2016
- Running time: 134 minutes
- Country: India
- Language: Tamil

Jithan 2 is a 2016 Indian Tamil language horror comedy film directed by Rahul Paramahamsa and written by Vincent Selva. The film is a sequel to Jithan (2005), and stars Jithan Ramesh and Srushti Dange. The film began production in December 2013 and it released on 8 April 2016 to poor reviews. The film was dubbed and released in Telugu as Pizza 3 in 2018. The film had background score by Yeshwanth Raja. The film received negative reviews from critics.

== Cast ==
- Jithan Ramesh as Surya
- Srushti Dange as Priya
- Meghali as Anjali
- Karunas as Surya's known person
- Mayilsamy as Venugopal
- Yogi Babu as Annayya
- George Maryan as Sombu Vinayagam
- Robo Shankar as Police Officer
- Vinoth Babu as Police Constable
- Sona Heiden
- Swaminathan
- Nellai Siva as Vijayakumar
- Bharanidharan as Bharani
- Supergood Subramani
- Kesava
- Vengal Rao
- TSR Srinivasan as Done Done (uncredited)
- Sandy (cameo appearance)

== Production ==
In September 2013, RPM productions began working on a sequel to the successful 2005 film Jithan, with newcomer Rahul brought in as director. The script was written by Vincent Selva who has directed the first one. The team tried to bring in Santhanam to play a parallel lead role, but were unsuccessful in their attempts. The film subsequently progressed throughout Chennai. Srushti Dange has been confirmed as the heroine for Jithan 2. The film was on the verge of completion in July 2014, with all portions apart from the songs finished. The team began post-production work in late 2014 and targeted an April 8, 2016 release.

== Reception ==
The film received negative reviews from critics. Sify wrote "Generally, even a poorly made movie have some kind of positive aspects to talk about but Jithan 2 is a nightmare, which we want to quickly erase from our memory". The Times of India wrote "Jithan-2 involves a ghost and is billed as a horror movie, but the only thing that haunts us after seeing the film — and might even result in sleepless nights — is an unending stream of questions." Rediff wrote "Painfully slow, drab and immature, this horror comedy has you yawning right from the start." The Hindu wrote that "Jithan 2 is so bad in every department, so soporific an experience, so dreadfully tedious that I fear that my experience of watching it has, on some level, robbed me just a little of my will to live".
