= Puli Varudhu =

- DVD cover
- Directed by: G. V. Kumar
- Written by: G. V. Kumar
- Produced by: Anthony
- Starring: Jithan Ramesh; Mallika Kapoor; Manivannan; Saranya; Karunas; Livingston
- Cinematography: C. Rajasekar
- Edited by: Raja Mohammad
- Music by: Srikanth Deva
- Production company: ELK Film Productions
- Release date: 21 December 2007
- Country: India
- Language: Tamil

Puli Varudhu (transl. Tiger is coming) is a 2007 Indian Tamil language romantic comedy film directed by G. V. Kumar, starring Jithan Ramesh and Mallika Kapoor, with Manivannan, Saranya, Karunas, and Livingston in supporting roles. The music was composed by Srikanth Deva, and the film was released on 21 December 2007 to mixed reviews.

== Plot ==
Ramesh (Jithan Ramesh) is the son of Manivannan and Saranya. Karuppa (Karunas) and other friends stay in Ramesh's house as paying guests. Ramesh's parents treat them as their own. Ramesh's parents want their son to fall in love and get married, but Ramesh prefers an arranged marriage.

A mutual friend of Ramesh and Karuppa is getting a fixed marriage. Along with Karuppa, Ramesh goes to their friend's village to attend the marriage. On the way there, he has a dream that he meets a beautiful girl Shenbagam (Mallika Kapoor), but also that his friend would die in an accident. He wakes up with a shout and later attends the wedding with Karuppa. Ramesh later meets Gayathri (Mallika Kapoor again) and falls in love with her. Karuppa informs the love of Ramesh and Gayathri to Ramesh's parents.

Upon returning home, Ramesh's parents accept his love and affection for Gayathri. They plan to meet her and her parents in order to finalize their engagement and fix the marriage date. Ramesh then dreams again of his engagement to Gayathri. This time, before the marriage, his father passes away due to a heart attack, and Gayathri attempts to commit suicide. He again wakes up from the dream with a shout. Ramesh's parents ask him about the sudden scream, but he refuses to tell. Karuppa then asks him about it, and Ramesh tells his dream. In the morning, they wake up in the village. Things go as planned, but some of Ramesh's dreams become reality. Gayathri speaks to him, and they visit some of the places that she took him in his dream. After the engagement, Ramesh, his friends, and his family return home.

Ramesh fears that more of his dreams might come true and panics. He begins to avoid everyone and everything, including Gayathri. He even goes to the extent of cancelling the wedding. Does Ramesh overcome his fearsome dreams and do the lovers marry?

== Cast ==
- Jithan Ramesh as Ramesh
- Mallika Kapoor as Gayathri / Shenbagam
- Manivannan as Ramesh's father
- Saranya as Sumathi, Ramesh's mother
- Karunas as Karuppan ('Karuppu' Singam)
- Livingston as Psychiatrist Vaitheeswaran
- Vinayaga as Vinayaga
- Manikka Vinayagam as Gayathri's father
- Kuyili as Gayathri's mother
- Pandu as Vinayaga's father
- Devadarshini as Sudha
- Mohan Raman as Judge
- Santhana Bharathi as Shenbagam's father
- Kadhal Dhandapani as Vinayaga's father
- Jaya Murali as Shenbagam's mother
- Chetan as Vetri
- Priyadharshini as Sun TV anchor
- Nellai Siva as Bus driver
- Periya Karuppu Thevar

Special appearance

- Perarasu in a song "Kanava Nejama"
- Sridhar in a song "Theru Varudhu"
- G. V. Kumar as a lorry driver

== Soundtrack ==
The soundtrack was composed by Srikanth Deva with lyrics written by Na. Muthukumar.

- "Oru Murai" — Madhu Balakrishnan, Anitha Karthikeyan
- "Aasai Vachen" — K. S. Chithra, Vijay Yesudas
- "Theru Varudhu" — Manikka Vinayagam, Ramesh Rao
- "Kanava Nejama" — Anuradha Sriram, Harish Raghavendra
- "Kadhalikka Solludi" — Manikka Vinayagam, Swarnalatha, Senthildass Velayutham, Karunas

== Critical reception ==
Sify wrote "While provision has to be made for suspension of disbelief in popular entertainment; Puli Varuthu stretches beyond belief and endurance too and ends up as a big bore". Revathi of Kalki praised the acting, humour, and cinematography but criticised Srikanth Deva's music and noted that the story is different but feels dated in many places.
