= MGR Sivaji Rajini Kamal =

2015 film directed by Robert

- Theatrical release poster
- Directed by: Robert
- Written by: Robert; Vanitha Vijayakumar
- Produced by: Vanitha Vijayakumar
- Starring: Robert; Vanitha Vijayakumar; Ramji; Nirosha; Aishwarya
- Edited by: R. J. Anand
- Music by: Srikanth Deva
- Production company: Vanitha Film Production
- Distributed by: Mishri Movies; Vibrant Movies
- Release date: 8 May 2015
- Running time: 130 minutes
- Country: India
- Language: Tamil

MGR Sivaji Rajini Kamal (also credited as MGR Sivaji Rajini Kamal Rasigargal Narpani Mandram) is a 2015 Indian Tamil-language comedy film directed by Robert, who also starred in the film in the lead role. The film stars an ensemble cast including its producer and dialogue writer Vanitha Vijayakumar, Nirosha, Aishwarya and Ramji in other lead roles. The film had a musical score by Srikanth Deva and was released on 8 May 2015.

== Plot ==
Four drunken friends rob ATMs while donning masks of well-known Tamil actors. A female police officer promises to track down and apprehend the offenders.

== Cast ==
- Robert as Battu
- Ramji as Kannamma
- Aishwarya as Aishwarya
- Nirosha
- Vanitha Vijayakumar as Ayana
- Jaguar Thangam
- Srikanth Deva as Sri
- Ganeshkar as Ganeshkar
- Ashwin Raja
- Vanitha Krishnachandran
- Ravikanth as Vanarajan
- Chandrika
- Ganesh
- Suresh
- Powerstar Srinivasan as the church father (guest appearance)
- Premgi Amaren as Premgi (guest appearance)

== Production ==
The film was the brainchild of choreographer Robert and actress Vanitha Vijayakumar, who were keen to make a comedy film together. Robert made his debut as director, and cast himself in the film's lead role. Vanitha chose to produce the film for an old production studio, Vanitha Film Production, launched by her parents, Vijayakumar and Manjula in the 1980s. It subsequently became the studio's third film following Nenjangal (1982) and Kai Kodukkum Kai (1984). The film was titled MGR Sivaji Rajini Kamal after popular Tamil actors MGR, Sivaji Ganesan, Rajinikanth and Kamal Haasan – who Vanitha claimed she paid tribute through with the title.

== Soundtrack ==
MGR Sivaji Rajini Kamal

Soundtrack album by Sri
- Recorded: 2014
- Genre: Feature film soundtrack
- Producer: Sri

For the film, music composer Srikanth Deva was credited as Sri.

Track listing
No.	Title	Lyrics	Singer(s)	Length
1.	"Sanki Monkey"	Gana Guna	Gana Guna	04:52
2.	"Nethu Rathri"	Robert	Srikanth Deva, Lucy Vincent	04:21
3.	"Classical Drama" (Instrumental)	—	—	03:23
4.	"MGR Sivaji Rajini Kamal"	Bizmac	Bizmac	03:21

== Release and reception ==
The film opened in May 2015 to negative reviews from critics. A reviewer from The New Indian Express opined that "Surely, this writer-director team, which is associated with the film industry for a long time, could have done some homework before they ventured into their debut project". A reviewer from DesiMartini.com wrote "the script was intended to make the audience laugh but the execution was annoying", and that "other technical aspects are very mediocre and very ordinary stuff" and the "writing is very amateurish and the film is very low on production values". The film did not perform well at the box office.

In 2019, Robert denied that he was romantically involved with Vanitha and claimed that the pair decided to make the film on professional terms. He added that he and Vanitha told the media about their alleged relationship in order to promote the film. Vanitha later called out Robert for his false interviews, and stated that the film was indeed produced when the pair were in a relationship.
