= Jithan =

- DVD cover
- Directed by: R. K. Vincent Selva
- Screenplay by: R. K. Vincent Selva
- Story by: Prawaal Raman (unc.); Kona Venkat (unc.); Suresh Nair (unc.)
- Produced by: R. Radhika Sarathkumar
- Starring: Ramesh; Pooja
- Cinematography: R. Ramesh Babu
- Edited by: Sadagopan Ramesh; V. T. Vijayan (supervision)
- Music by: Srikanth Deva
- Production company: Radaan Mediaworks
- Distributed by: Super Good Films
- Release date: 6 May 2005
- Running time: 132 minutes
- Country: India
- Language: Tamil
- Budget: ₹1 crore
- Box office: ₹4 crore

Jithan (spelt onscreen as Githan) is a 2005 Indian Tamil-language supernatural romantic thriller film directed by R. K. Vincent Selva. The film stars Ramesh (in his Tamil debut) and Pooja along with Kalabhavan Mani, S. Ve. Shekher, Livingston, Mukesh and Nalini. R. Sarathkumar played a guest role in the film.

The film was simultaneously shot with the Hindi film, Gayab (2004) and was produced by Raadan Mediaworks, owned by Radhika. The music for the film was composed by Srikanth Deva. The film was released to positive reviews and became a hit.

== Plot ==
Surya, an introvert by nature, loves his classmate Priya from childhood but has never expressed his feelings towards her. Meanwhile, Surya's classmate Ajay also tries to woo Priya, in which he succeeds but to an extent. Priya does not like Surya as she views him as a nerd. One day, Surya gets frustrated as he is not being liked by anyone and cries loudly in a beach, where he finds a small idol of a god. He holds the idol, saying that it is better to be invisible rather than being disliked by everyone.

On returning home, Surya gets shocked knowing that he has really become invisible, while others can't see him but can only hear his voice. Surya's father is worried, as he is missing. Surya understands his father's love and discloses the truth to him alone. Taking advantage of invisibility, he always accompanies Priya without disturbing her. He also plays pranks on Ajay to exhibit his anger. Surya discloses the truth to Priya also following which she gets scared on hearing Surya's voice. Surya decides to rob a bank so that he could get some gifts for Priya, following which he gets media attention.

A special police team led by Tamizharasu and his assistant Singampuli is appointed to trap the invisible man behind the bank robbery. Priya informs the truth about Surya's power to Tamizharasu, and they set an eye on Surya to prevent him from committing further crimes. Despite attempts made by Tamizharasu's team, they are unable to stop Surya. Surya threatens that he will create problems in city if Priya does not love him. He even pops into Singampuli's house while he is drunk and fights with him, reducing Singampuli to his underwear lying on the floor as Surya is invisible. The DGP and Tamizharasu laugh at Singampuli and tease him, but he swears revenge one day.

Tamizharasu comes up with a plan of using Priya to trap Surya and asks Priya to cooperate with the plan. Tamizharasu wants Priya to bring Surya to a deserted place which is already surrounded by police. Priya should talk pleasingly to Surya and in the meantime, should place her shawl over Surya, so that the police can trap him. Everything progresses well as per plan. Surya comes to the place to meet Priya.

Surya becomes emotional and starts describing his love towards Priya from childhood. He also explains certain events where Priya actually misunderstood him previously. On hearing these, Priya understands Surya to be an innocent and kindhearted person who loves her a lot. Tamizharasu overhears their conversation, understands Surya's good nature, and decides to trap him alive instead of killing. Tamizharasu instructs Priya to put her shawl on Surya, but Priya changes her mind. She informs the truth to Surya and pleads him to run away. Upon knowing the plan, Surya tries to escape, but suddenly it rains whereby revealing his presence because water droplets on Surya make others see it. Despite Tamizharasu's instructions, Singampuli shoots Surya in the head as payback for Surya humiliating him by embarrassing Singampuli in his own house by stripping him naked. Singampuli arrogantly laughs and brags to both Surya and Tamizharasu, celebrating his revenge. Surya falls to the ground, rolling as he dies and his body becomes visible to everyone. Tamizharasu admonishes Singampuli for his shallowness. Priya cries seeing Surya's dead body, as she understood his good nature before his death.

== Cast ==
- R. Sarathkumar as DCP Tamizharasu (guest appearance)
- Ramesh as Surya
- Pooja as Priya
- Kalabhavan Mani as Singampuli (Muthupandi)
- S. Ve. Shekher as Priya's father
- Livingston as Surya's father
- Mukesh as Ajay
- Nalini as Surya's mother
- Viji Kitti as Priya's mother
- Thalaivasal Vijay as the politician
- Vijay Krishnaraj as DGP
- Madhan Bob as Dr. S. Manicham
- Jasmine (special appearance in the song "Ah Mudhal Akku")
- Raviraj as V. Avinash, the company MD
- Bava Lakshmanan as an auto driver
- Bayilvan Ranganathan as a man at the beach

Uncredited

- Jasper as Dharma
- Chelladurai as the security guard
- Mysskin as a man at the telephone booth
- Boys Rajan as a teacher
- Vijay Ganesh as a man at the beach
- Japan Kumar (special appearance in the song "Ah Mudhal Akku")

== Production ==
The film began production as a multilingual film with Ram Gopal Varma producing the Hindi version (Gayab) while Radhika Sarathkumar produced the Tamil version. The film was announced in January 2004, with R. B. Choudary's son Ramesh signed to make his Tamil debut. Part of the film was shot in Chennai. The songs "Ennai Thedi" and "Coimbatore" were shot at Phuket Province. Unlike Gayab, the film was made with a tragic ending.

== Soundtrack ==
The music was composed by Srikanth Deva and released by Star Music. The music from the film has several inspirations: the "Coimbatore" song reuses lyrics from "Kunguma Poove" from Maragatham (1959), the song "Ah Mudhal Akku" is a kuthu remix of "Koduthellam Koduthaan" from Padagotti (1964) and the background score was reused from Dhoom (2004). The song "Aa Mudhal Akku" was reused for the 2006 Telugu movie Khatarnak as "Doma Kudithe Chicken Guniya" and in the 2009 Kannada movie Chamkaisi Chindi Udaysi as "Colour Colour Duniya".

Jithan

Soundtrack album by Srikanth Deva
- Released: 2005
- Recorded: 2005
- Genre: Soundtrack
- Length: 29:34
- Label: Star Music
- Producer: Srikanth Deva

Srikanth Deva chronology
Aai (2004)	Jithan (2005)	Chanakya (2005)

Track list
No.	Title	Lyrics	Singer(s)	Length
1.	"Ennai Thedi"	Thamarai	Karthik, Sunitha Sarathy	5:30
2.	"Kadhaliye"	Kabilan	Harish Raghavendra	4:59
3.	"Naan Than Kadavulada"	Barathi Kalyan	Ranjith	3:06
4.	"Coimbatore"	Na. Muthukumar	Srikanth Deva, Febi Mani	5:24
5.	"Ah Mudhal Akku"	Kabilan	Shankar Mahadevan	4:59
6.	"Thalattu Paattu"	Instrumental	Febi Mani	2:53
7.	"Theme"		Instrumental	2:43
Total length:				29:34

== Reception ==
A reviewer from The Hindu wrote that "As the timid Surya, the new hero Ramesh does a good job. The sad yet powerful eyes convey emotions well. ... Sarath Kumar in a guest role lends dignity and power to the police officer he portrays". A reviewer from Sify wrote that "But every time you get involved, the script of director Vincent Selva disappears".

After the success of the film, Ramesh appended "Jithan" to his stage name and received further film offers. A namesake sequel was made titled Jithan 2 (2020) with Ramesh reprising his role.
