= Madharas Mafia Company =

2025 Tamil gangster film

- Theatrical release poster
- Directed by: A. S. Mukundan
- Written by: A. S. Mukundan
- Story by: V. Suganthi Annadurai
- Produced by: V. Suganthi Annadurai
- Starring: Anandaraj; Samyuktha Shanmuganathan; Munishkanth
- Cinematography: Ashokraj
- Edited by: S. Devaraj
- Music by: Srikanth Deva
- Production company: Anna Productions
- Release date: 14 November 2025
- Running time: 126 minutes
- Country: India
- Language: Tamil

Madharas Mafia Company is a 2025 Indian Tamil-language gangster film directed by A. S. Mukundan in his directorial debut. The film has story written and produced by V. Suganthi Annadurai under her Anna Productions banner. The film stars Anandaraj and Samyuktha Shanmuganathan in the lead roles.

Madharas Mafia Company released in theatres on 14 November 2025.

== Cast ==
- Anandaraj as Pungavanam
- Samyuktha Shanmuganathan as ACP Thigazh Bharathi IPS
- Munishkanth
- Deepa Shankar
- Sasilaya
- Anand Babu
- Ramachandran Durairaj
- Mippu
- Shakeela
- Aradhaya
- C. Ranganathan
- Vadachennai Anbu
- Rishi Prakash
- Richi Green
- Muthu Buvan
- Ashmitha
- A.E. Jagadeesh Dharmaraj
- SG. Dhamodharan

== Production ==
Set in the backdrop of North Chennai the film is directed by A. S. Mukundan in his debut and produced by V. Suganthi Annadurai under Anna Productions banner. The film stars Anandaraj and Bigg Boss Tamil 4 fame Samyuktha Shanmuganathan in the lead roles alongside Munishkanth, Deepa Shankar, Sasilaya, Anand Babu and others in supporting roles. After a formal puja ceremony, the principal photography began in early-October 2024. The film has cinematography handled by Ashokraj and music composed by Srikanth Deva.

== Music ==
Madharas Mafia Company

Soundtrack album by Srikanth Deva
- Released: 31 October 2025
- Genre: Feature film soundtrack
- Language: Tamil
- Label: Saregama
- Producer: Srikanth Deva

Srikanth Deva chronology
| Kutram Thavir (2025) | Madharas Mafia Company (2025) |

Singles from Madharas Mafia Company
- 1. "Machi Nee Paadu Daa" Released: 20 September 2025; 2. "Rangalala" Released: 5 November 2025; 3. "Irage" Released: 11 November 2025
External audio
- Madharas Mafia Company - Full Album on YouTube

The first single "Machi Nee Paadu Daa" was released on 20 September 2025. The second single "Rangalala" was released on 5 November 2025. The third single "Irage" was released on 11 November 2025.

All lyrics are written by Ku. Karthik; all music is composed by Srikanth Deva.

Track listing
| No. | Title | Singer(s) | Length |
|---|---|---|---|
| 1. | "Machi Nee Paadu Daa" | Deva |
| 2. | "Rangalala" | Priya Himesh |
| 3. | "Irage" | Srinisha Jayaseelan |

== Release and reception ==
Madharas Mafia Company released in theatres on 14 November 2025. Dinamalar gave 2.5/5 stars after criticising the film for its weak plot and scenes. Abhinav Subramanian of The Times of India gave 2/5 stars and wrote "Director A.S. Mukundan tries dressing a serious crime story in commercial comedy clothes, but the fabric tears at every seam."
