= Srikanth Deva =

Indian music director of Tamil films

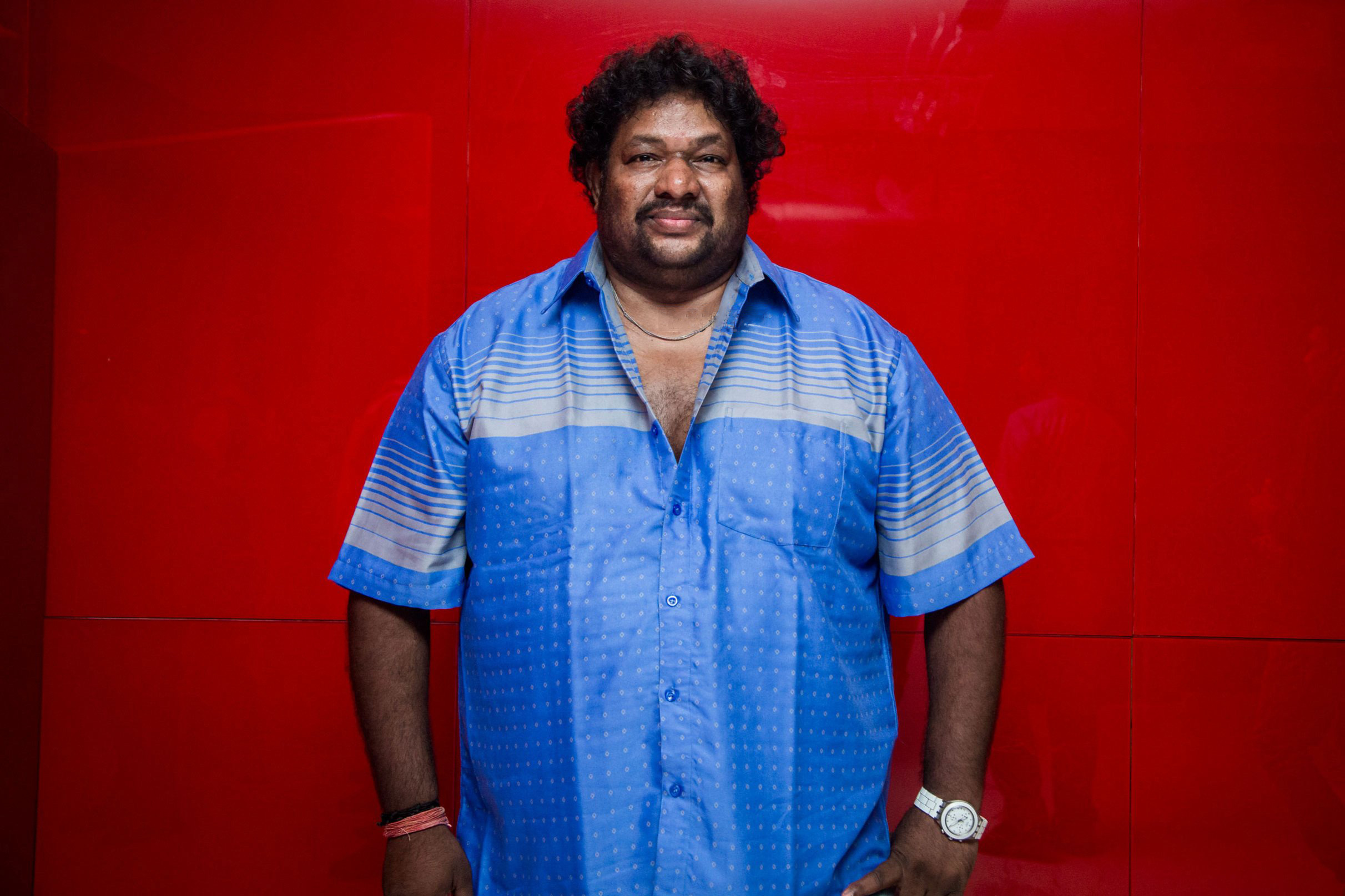
- Srikanth Deva at Bongu Audio Launch
- Born: 20 July 1977 (age 49); Chennai, India
- Education: St. John's Matriculation Higher Secondary School Alwarthirunagar
- Occupations: Actor, Music Director, composer
- Years active: 2000–present
- Spouse: Febi Mani
- Children: 2
- Parent: Deva
- Relatives: Jai (cousin); Sabesh–Murali (uncles)

Srikanth Deva is an Indian music director of Tamil films. He made his debut as music director in the Tamil movie Doubles in 2000. He is the son of famous music composer Deva, nephew of the famous music director duo Sabesh–Murali and the cousin of actor Jai. In 2023, Srikanth Deva was awarded the National Film Award – Special Mention (non-feature film) for composing music for a Tamil short film called Karuvarai (2021).

== Life and career ==
In his young age, Srikanth Deva used to play musical instruments in Gangai Amaran, Deepan Chakravarthy, and Malaysia Vasudevan's Katcheri (musical concert). Srikanth had a band along with his friends called "Surabi".

In 2000, Srikanth made his debut as music director in Doubles which is directed by Pandiarajan. He made his next film in 2004 with Silambarasan's Kuthu, in which the songs became a hit in the industry for its dance numbers. Same year, he worked for M. Kumaran Son of Mahalakshmi which won Tamil Nadu State Film Award for Best Music Director. Srikanth Deva made his 100th film Priyamudan Priya which released on 5 August 2023. Srikanth married Febi Mani, a playback singer in the Tamil film industry, on 21 February 2005 at Chennai.

== Discography ==
=== Tamil films ===
Year	Film	Score	Songs	Notes
2000	Doubles	Yes	Yes	
2004	Kuthu	Yes	Yes	
2004	M. Kumaran S/O Mahalakshmi	Yes	Yes	Tamil Nadu State Film Award for Best Music Director
2004	Aai	Yes	Yes	
2005	Jithan	Yes	Yes	
2005	Chanakya	Yes	Yes	
2005	Sivakasi	Yes	Yes	
2005	Bambara Kannaley	Yes	Yes	
2005	Vetrivel Sakthivel	Yes	Yes	
2006	Saravana	Yes	Yes	
2006	Sudesi	Yes	Yes	
2006	Aacharya	Yes	Yes	
2006	Dharmapuri	Yes	Yes	
2006	E	Yes	Yes	
2006	Thalaimagan	No	Yes	1 song
2006	Nenjirukkum Varai	Yes	Yes	
2006	Thagapansamy	Yes	Yes	
2007	Aalwar	Yes	Yes	
2007	Madurai Veeran	Yes	Yes	
2007	Mudhal Kanave	Yes	Yes	
2007	Thiru Ranga	Yes	Yes	
2007	Nam Naadu	Yes	Yes	
2007	Nenjai Thodu	Yes	Yes	
2007	Piragu	Yes	Yes	
2007	Naalaiya Pozhuthum Unnodu	Yes	Yes	
2007	Puli Varudhu	Yes	Yes	
2008	Pazhani	Yes	Yes	
2008	Thangam	Yes	Yes	
2008	Sila Nerangalil	Yes	Yes	
2008	Thotta	Yes	Yes	
2008	Theekuchi	Yes	Yes	
2008	Vaitheeswaran	Yes	Yes	
2008	Vedha	Yes	Yes	
2008	Arasangam	Yes	Yes	
2008	Nepali	Yes	Yes	
2008	Pandi	Yes	Yes	
2008	Kathavarayan	Yes	Yes	
2008	Aayudham Seivom	Yes	Yes	
2008	Thenavattu	Yes	Yes	
2008	Thiruvannamalai	Yes	Yes	
2009	Perumal	Yes	Yes	
2009	Thee	Yes	Yes	
2009	Guru En Aalu	Yes	Yes	
2009	Aarumaname	Yes	Yes	
2009	Vaidehi	Yes	Yes	
2010	Thottupaar	Yes	Yes	
2010	Aattanayagann	Yes	Yes	
2011	Avargalum Ivargalum	Yes	Yes	
2011	Karungali	Yes	Yes	Dubbed in Telugu as Sathi Leelavathi
2011	Puli Vesham	Yes	Yes	
2011	Mathikettan Salai	Yes	Yes	
2011	Aayiram Vilakku	Yes	Yes	
2011	Raa Raa	Yes	Yes	
2012	Aathi Narayana	Yes	Yes	
2012	Marupadiyum Oru Kadhal	Yes	Yes	
2012	Murattu Kaalai	Yes	Yes	
2013	Chandhamama	Yes	Yes	
2013	Isakki	Yes	Yes	
2013	Thulli Vilayadu	Yes	Yes	
2013	Arya Surya	Yes	Yes	
2013	6 Melugu Varthigal	Yes	Yes	
2013	Ragalaipuram	Yes	Yes	
2013	Arjunan Kadhali	Yes	Yes	
2014	Eppodhum Vendraan	Yes	Yes	
2014	Angusam	Yes	Yes	
2014	Kadhalai Thavira Verondrum Illai	Yes	Yes	
2014	Velmurugan Borewells	Yes	Yes	
2014	Naadodi Vamsam	Yes	Yes	Not Released
2015	Killadi	Yes	Yes	
2015	En Vazhi Thani Vazhi	Yes	Yes	
2015	MGR Sivaji Rajini Kamal	Yes	Yes	
2015	Purampokku Engira Podhuvudamai	Yes	No	
2015	Nanbargal Narpani Mandram	Yes	Yes	
2015	Achaaram	Yes	Yes	
2015	Palakkattu Madhavan	Yes	Yes	
2015	Aavi Kumar	No	Yes	1 song
2015	Kalai Vendhan	Yes	Yes	
2015	Boologam	Yes	Yes	
2016	Jithan 2	Yes	Yes	
2016	Angali Pangali	Yes	Yes	
2016	Thirunaal	Yes	Yes	
2016	Ilami	Yes	Yes	
2017	Bongu	Yes	Yes	
2017	Vilayattu Aarambam	Yes	Yes	
2018	Nagesh Thiraiarangam	Yes	Yes	
2019	Nethraa	Yes	Yes	
2019	Oviyavai Vitta Yaru	Yes	Yes	
2019	Kabilavasthu	Yes	Yes	
2019	Thavam	Yes	Yes	
2020	Alti	Yes	Yes	
2021	Namma Oorukku Ennadhan Achu	Yes	Yes	
2021	Ainthu Unarvugal	Yes	Yes	
2021	Obama Ungalukkaaga	Yes	Yes	
2021	Karuvarai	Yes	No	short film National Film Award – Special Mention (non-feature film)
2022	Mugamariyaan	Yes	Yes	
2022	Aadhaar	Yes	Yes	
2022	Kalaga Thalaivan	Yes	No	
2022	Therkathi Veeran	Yes	Yes	
2023	Irumban	Yes	Yes	
2023	Priyamudan Priya	Yes	Yes	
2023	Kattil	Yes	Yes	
2024	Kaaduvetty	Yes	No	
2025	Mrs & Mr	Yes	Yes	
2025	Kutram Thavir	Yes	Yes	
2025	Madharas Mafia Company	Yes	Yes	
2025	Nirvaagam Porupalla	Yes	Yes	

=== Telugu films ===
Year	Film	Notes
2006	Evandoi Srivaru	
2007	Vijayadasami	Remake of Sivakasi
2009	Venkatadri	
2009	Adhineta	
2013	Sevakudu	Dubbed in Tamil as Ini Oru Vidhi Seivom

=== Other language films ===
Year	Film	Score	Language	Notes
2011	Help	Yes	English	Short film
2021	Mmmmm	Yes	Malayalam	

=== Singer ===
Year	Film	Song	Co-Singer
2003	Kadhal Kirukkan	"Kadhal Kirukka"	
2004	Aai	"Meyau Meyau"	Sadhana Sargam
2004	Jore	"Mummy Chellama"	Srilekha Parthasarathy
2004	M. Kumaran Son of Mahalakshmi	"Neeye Neeye"	
2005	Chanakya	"Alaudin"	Vadivelu & Roshini
2005	Jithan	"Coimbatore"	Febi Mani
2007	Aalwar	"Mayile Mayile"	Senthildass Velayutham, Roshini, Suruthipriya, Arjun Thamas & Sujavitha
2007	Madurai Veeran	"Kalaiyum Neeye"	Febi Mani
2007	Madurai Veeran	"Gokka Makka"	Priyadarshini & Senthildass Velayutham
2007	Piragu	"Unnaipole Pennai"	Srilekha Parthasarathy
2008	Kathavarayan	"Aasaiye Alaipole"	Malathy Lakshman
2008	Nepali	"Love in Minor"	
2008	Thotta	"Va Va Va Mappillai"	Janani Bharadwaj & Archith
2010	Thottupaar	"Usurula"	Sangeetha Sajith
2011	Puli Vesham	"Top Class"	Surmukhi Raman, M. L. R. Karthikeyan & Anitha Karthikeyan
2013	Arya Surya	"Star Star"	Hemambika
2013	Ragalaipuram	"Sudamani"	Grace Karunas
2014	Kadhalai Thavira Verondrum Illai	"Kedi Boys"	
2015	MGR Sivaji Rajini Kamal	"Nethu Rathri"	Lucy Vincent
2016	Angali Pangali	"Amma Endra Sol"	
2016	Angali Pangali	"Kutti Chandran"	Jayashri, Kovai Murali & Anbarasi
2017	Vilayattu Aarambam	"Nanba Nee"	
2017	Vilayattu Aarambam	"Vidiyale"	
2019	Nethraa	"Sollamale"	Namitha Babu
2019	Oviyavai Vitta Yaru	"Riya Riya"	Kavitha Gopi & MC Vickey
2019	Oviyavai Vitta Yaru	"Un Punnagaiyil"	Nincy Vincent
2019	Thavam	"Kaadhalil Vizhunthen"	V. Shinee

== Filmography ==
Year	Film	Role	Notes
2005	Sivakasi	Himself	Special appearance
2008	Vedha	Himself	Special appearance in the song "Vannarpetta"
2009	Suriyan Satta Kalloori	Himself	Special appearance in the song "Kadhal Panna"
2013	Chandhamama	Himself	Special appearance
2015	MGR Sivaji Rajini Kamal	Sri	
2016	Ennama Katha Vudranunga	Himself	Special appearance in titular song
2021	Obama Ungalukkaga		
2022	Therkathi Veeran	Himself	Special appearance
2025	Kutram Thavir	Himself	Special appearance in the song "Podu Anna Adiya Pola"

== Television ==
Year	Title	Role	Channel	Language	Notes
2024	Cooku with Comali season 5	Contestant	Star Vijay	Tamil	Eliminated Episode 8
