= Theeradha Vilaiyattu Pillai =

- Theatrical release poster
- Directed by: Thiru
- Written by: Thiru
- Produced by: Vikram Krishna
- Starring: Vishal; Sarah-Jane Dias; Tanushree Dutta; Neetu Chandra
- Cinematography: Arvind Krishna
- Edited by: T. S. Suresh
- Music by: Yuvan Shankar Raja
- Production company: G K Film Corporation
- Distributed by: Sun Pictures
- Release date: 12 February 2010
- Running time: 160 minutes
- Country: India
- Language: Tamil

Theeradha Vilaiyattu Pillai (transl. The Insatiable Playboy) is a 2010 Indian Tamil-language romantic action comedy film written and directed by Thiru. The film was produced by Vikram Krishna. Starring Vishal in the lead role along with Sarah-Jane Dias who makes her acting debut. while, Tanushree Dutta and Neetu Chandra making her debut in Tamil cinema Santhanam, Sathyan, Mayilsamy, and T. S. B. K. Mouli play supporting roles, while Sneha and Mallika Kapoor make special appearances and Prakash Raj in a guest role. The film was later dubbed into Telugu as Khiladi in 2012.

The film follows the story of Karthik (Vishal), a happy-go-lucky youth and only child, who is also rich and spoilt. Karthik believes in trying out and choosing the best of everything in his life. When he decides to adopt the same practice in choosing his wife and selects three potential candidates of totally different shades and social stratifications, who he simultaneously woos, problems emerge and he gets into trouble. How he manages to overcome all problems and who he finally chooses to marry forms the crux of the story.

The film, featuring music scored by Yuvan Shankar Raja, cinematography by Arvind Krishna and editing by T. S. Suresh, was distributed by Sun Pictures on 12 February 2010.

The background music was adapted from Rajinikanth's Netrikkann.

== Plot ==
Karthik is a lazy, jobless, upper-middle-class man. His father is a bank manager. Karthik always hangs around with his friends: an auto rickshaw driver Kumar; a tea shop owner Shekar; and a traffic constable Vishnu. Over-ambitious in his life, he always wants the best of everything, from pens and clothes to every other accessory, and has made it a rule to try out everything before zeroing in on one. Now wanting to choose his best life partner, he applies the same method and decides to select three girls, whom he would romance at the same time and make fall in love with him, then reject two of them and finally marry the third one.

Karthik's first choice is Jyothi, an athlete living in the poorer area of Chennai, who has reservations against men and slaps a guy for touching her inappropriately. Karthik later attends a wedding, where he meets his second candidate Priya, who strongly believes in traditional and cultural values and has a policy of loving and marrying only one boy in her life. The third one Karthik selects is Tejaswini, a rich and arrogant girl and the heir to ₹1,500 crore (US$160 million), who once had a failed attempt at love. Karthik enters their lives, woos them with lies, and finally wins their hearts. The girls do not know the fact that Karthik is romancing three girls simultaneously and entirely trust him.

One day, thanks to her caring and understanding father Ranganathan, who does not want his daughter to have another love failure, Tejaswini realizes Karthik's plans and intentions and confronts him. Karthik dumps her and continues to romance Jyothi and Priya, while Tejaswini vows to take revenge on him. Without revealing her own identity and Karthik's true identity and intentions, she befriends the other two girls. She gives them advice on how to speed up the progress of getting married soon, trying to put Karthik under pressure and blow his cover. Soon, Jyothi finds out the truth. Karthik rejects her and settles down with Priya as his future wife, who was responsible for Karthik's change of mind as he has now learnt the value of true love and realizes his mistakes.

However, as Jyothi's rowdy brother Anbalazhagan confronts Karthik that he has betrayed Jyothi, Karthik reveals the truth about himself, his intentions, and the other girls to Priya, who was with him. Downheartedly, she leaves Karthik, whom Anbalazhagan and his gang beat up. Karthik then causes a traffic accident, getting himself tangled and injured in the accident, and gets admitted to a hospital, where Dr. Ramya comes for his treatment. He pretends to have lost his memory due to the accident to arouse compassion in Priya and also to change his behavior to be more loyal to Priya, eventually indeed succeeding in his plan as Priya returns and reunites with him.

The film ends with Karthik breaking the fourth wall to the audience, saying that he plans to "live as a new man and love Priya only". The film ends with him asking the audience if they believe him, after which his future is left for them to predict.

== Cast ==
- Vishal as Karthik
  - Sree Ram as young Karthik
- Sarah-Jane Dias as Priya (Voice dubbed by Savitha Reddy)
- Tanushree Dutta as Jyothi (Voice dubbed by Renuka Kathir)
- Neetu Chandra as Tejaswini Ranganathan (Voice dubbed by Chinmayi)
- Santhanam as Kumar, Karthik's friend
- Sathyan as Vishnu, Karthik's friend
- Mayilsamy as Shekar, Karthik's friend
- T. S. B. K. Mouli as Karthik's father
- Sudha as Karthik's mother
- Jayaprakash as Ranganathan
- Ajay Rathnam as a moneylender
- Scissor Manohar as an ambulance driver
- Crane Manohar as an ambulance driver
- Visweswara Rao as a money borrower
- Nellai Siva as a roadside shop owner
- Siva Narayana Murthy as an ambulance driver
- Prakash Raj as Anbalazhagan (cameo appearance)
- Sneha as Dr. Ramya (cameo appearance)
- Mallika Kapoor as an Interviewer (cameo appearance)

== Production ==
=== Development ===
In February 2009, it was reported, that Thiru, who assisted director A. Rajasekhar in the 2008 police story Sathyam, that also starred Vishal would direct Vishal after the actor had completed his Thoranai. The film was to be produced by Singanamala Ramesh Babu, who earlier produced Vijay's blockbuster film Pokkiri. However, as the producer later walked out of the project, Vishal's brother Vikram Krishna along with his wife Sriya Reddy eventually took up the project and decided to produce it under their home banner G K Film Corporation. The film was titled Theeratha Vilaiyattu Pillai, after a poem by Subramania Bharathi.

The film, during pre-production was billed up to be a remake of the 2007 Hindi film Bachna Ae Haseeno, which also starred three actresses in lead roles, but the claim proved to be false. Vishal also denied this, stating that the script is original. In January 2010, the film's distribution rights were acquired by Sun Pictures, which started its promotion campaign on 2 February 2010, ten days prior to the film's theatrical release.

=== Casting ===
After Vishal was confirmed as the lead actor in the film, Thiru and Vishal were looking for three actresses to play the lead female roles. Several actresses including Bipasha Basu, Reemma Sen, Priyamani, Tamannaah Bhatia and Shriya Saran were approached or even confirmed, before ultimately opting out again. Finally, Bollywood actress Neetu Chandra, who starred in the horror film Yavarum Nalam opposite Madhavan and another Bollywood actress Tanushree Dutta, a former Miss India Universe, making her debut in the Tamil film industry, were confirmed for the roles. For the lead female role, Sarah-Jane Dias, a former Miss India World, was signed. Additionally, reports claimed that the film would also have two lead actresses appearing in guest roles as well. In December 2009, Sneha was roped in to appear in one of the two cameo roles, whilst the other actress' identity was not revealed until the film's release.

=== Filming ===
The shooting started on 3 August and was held in several locations as Chennai, Hyderabad, the Maldives and Kochi. The title song of the film was shot in Mumbai at sets and choreographed by Bosco-Caesar, a popular choreographer duo that has worked for over 300 films in Bollywood, made their debut in Tamil with this film. For the same song, which was picturized in Vishal and the three leading actresses, Neetu Chandra is said to have soaked in a bathtub full of red chillies, which is considered one of the highlights of the entire film. Other songs were filmed in Australia and New Zealand. Furthermore, other songs were shot across Australia, in both urban and natural backgrounds.

== Music ==
Theeradha Vilaiyattu Pillai

Soundtrack album by Yuvan Shankar Raja
- Released: 16 December 2009
- Recorded: 2009
- Genre: Feature film soundtrack
- Length: 25:12
- Label: Sony Music
- Producer: Kailash Kalyan

Yuvan Shankar Raja chronology
Yogi (2009)	Theeradha Vilaiyattu Pillai (2009)	Goa (2010)

Film score and soundtrack are composed by Yuvan Shankar Raja. The album was released on 16 December 2009 at Devi Theatres which Sify called the "grandest affair of the season". Initially actors Kamal Haasan and Rajinikanth were said to the chief guests of the function, which, however, turned out to be untrue.

The album features five songs plus one introduction track by composer Yuvan Shankar Raja, while an additional song, not included in the soundtrack release, featured in the film as part of the film score. Lyrics were penned by Pa. Vijay and Vaali.

Track listing
No.	Title	Lyrics	Singer(s)	Length
1.	"Introduction"	Yuvan Shankar Raja	Yuvan Shankar Raja	1:14
2.	"Poo Mudhal Pen Varai"	Pa. Vijay	Yuvan Shankar Raja	4:35
3.	"En Jannal Vandha"	Pa. Vijay	Priya Himesh (Melody), Divya Vijay (Pop), Roshini (Folk), Pan Bundy (Rap)	4:44
4.	"Theeradha Vilaiyattu Pillai"	Vaali	Andrea Jeremiah, Tanvi Shah, Vinaitha, Ranjith	4:55
5.	"En Aasai Ethiraliye"	Pa. Vijay	Vijay Yesudas, Vinaitha	5:04
6.	"Oru Punnagai Thane"	Pa. Vijay	Ranjith	4:40
Total length:				25:12

Not in the soundtrack

Other music featured in the film includes:

1. Theriyamale, composed and performed by Yuvan Shankar Raja

== Reception ==
Rediff.com rated the film 2/5 stars and wrote, "Watch this one for the comedians' antics, Neetu Chandra and the behind-the-scenes fun. This chauvinistic Casanova inspires no melting romance for Valentine's Day". Sify Movies gave the movie a more lenient review.
