= Aachariyangal =

2012 Indian film by Harshavardhan

- Directed by: Harshavardhan
- Written by: Harshavardhan
- Produced by: Harshavardhan
- Starring: Thaman Kumar; Aishwarya Rajesh; Reethu Mangal; Mahanadi Shankar
- Cinematography: Deepak Bagavanth
- Edited by: Athiyappan Siva
- Music by: Ganesh Raghavendra
- Production company: Purple Patch Entertainment
- Release date: 24 August 2012
- Country: India
- Language: Tamil

Aachariyangal (transl. Surprises) is a 2012 Tamil-language fantasy thriller film written, produced and directed by debutant director Harshavardhan, starring Thaman Kumar, Aishwarya Rajesh, Reethu Mangal and Mahanadi Shankar. The film released on 24 August 2012.

== Plot ==
Karthik wants a "spicy life" and asks God to make his life as eventful as possible. He gets a mysterious call from 'God', who tells his that his wish has been granted and his life will change for the better or worse in the next 25 days...

== Cast ==
- Thaman Kumar as Karthik
- Aishwarya Rajesh as Anu
- Reethu Mangal as Anjana
- Swathi as Menaka
- Mahanadi Shankar as Guru
- Kualnchinathan
- Ram
- Narayanan Thirumalai as Keezh Cheree
- Shanthi Williams as Vaani
- Ramdoss as Police Inspector
- Balaji Kannan
- Amarasigamani
- Cool Suresh
- Rajapandi as Soori

== Production ==
The team of the film met actor Kamal Haasan in July 2012, with the director Harshavardhan being an alumnus of Kamal Haasan's 2009 screen-writing workshop.

== Critical reception ==
Rohit Ramachandran of Nowrunning.com rated it 3.5/5 stating that "Aachariyangal's got a sophisticated plot that's narrated with due simplicity and directed with candid straightforwardness." Malini Mannath of The New Indian Express concluded "Aachariyangal is a fairly enagaging [sic] fare from a debutant maker, who has made an effort to strike a different chord." The Times of India gave 2.5 stars out of 5 and wrote "if Aachariyangal works to a certain extent, it is mainly because of the inherent what-next suspense that the plot holds". Behindwoods gave 1.5 out of 5 and wrote "Aachariyangal might not make your day but it has its trump cards lined-up just when you feel like brushing it away".
