= Summa Nachunu Irukku =

2013 Indian film by A. Venkatesh

- Directed by: A. Venkatesh
- Written by: A. Venkatesh; Erode Mahesh (dialogues)
- Produced by: B. Vimal
- Starring: Thaman Kumar; Vibha Natarajan; Archana Vishwanath
- Cinematography: C. J. Rajkumar
- Edited by: V. T. Vijayan; N. Ganesh Kumar
- Music by: Achu Rajamani
- Production company: Esthell Entertainers
- Distributed by: Studio 9 Production
- Release date: 30 August 2013
- Running time: 130 minutes
- Country: India
- Language: Tamil

Summa Nachunu Irukku (transl. It is Just Amazing) is a 2013 Tamil-language comedy film directed by A. Venkatesh, who also starred in the film. The film stars Thaman Kumar, Vibha Natarajan and Archana Vishwanath along with an ensemble cast including Thambi Ramaiah, Srinivasan, Appukutty, and Erode Mahesh. The film, produced by B. Vimal, had musical score by Achu Rajamani and was released on 30 August 2013. The story of the film was inspired by the 1997 Malayalam film Chandralekha.

== Plot ==
Kannan, who has a lot of debt, comes from his village to find a job in Chennai. There, he becomes an auto driver. He then saves Anjali, the daughter of Gautham. Gautham, also known as Dato, is a wealthy man in Malaysia. Kannan takes Anjali to a hospital and is mistaken by the doctors to be her husband. Most of the relatives and Gautham also mistake him for the husband. In the meantime, Anjali falls into a coma. Kannan cannot tell the truth because of his family's debt. Kannan, his friend Gunaseelan, and his boss Chinniah take off to Malaysia along with Anjali's family. Appukutty, Gautham's cook, becomes suspicious of Kannan's identity. In addition to this enters Anjali's sister Ranjini. What transpires later forms the crux of the story.

== Cast ==
- Thaman Kumar as Kannan
- Vibha Natarajan as Anjali / Gayathri
- Archana Vishwanath as Ranjini
- Thambi Ramaiah as Chinniah
- Erode Mahesh as Gunaseelan
- Srinivasan as Ashok Rajendran and Rajendran
- Appukutty as Appukutty
- A. Venkatesh as Gautham (Dato)
- Vennira Aadai Moorthy as Bank Manager
- Vasu Vikram as Chidambaram
- Nirosha as Chithra
- Vanitha Vijayakumar as Kavitha
- Crane Manohar
- Muthukaalai
- Scissor Manohar
- Boys Rajan as Gautam's manager

== Production ==
A. Venkatesh, who has been an action film director all along, discussed a comic storyline with director Sneha Britto as he has not done a comedy movie until now. B. Vimal, Sneha Britto's father, accepted to produce the film. A. Venkatesh spotted Thaman Kumar in Sattam Oru Iruttarai. Thereafter, Thaman Kumar was signed to appear in the lead role with Vibha Natarajan and newcomer Archana Vishwanath. Thambi Ramaiah, Appukutty and Erode Mahesh were also part of the cast, while Srinivasan signed on to play the comedic villain. Achu Rajamani signed to score the music. V. T. Vijayan and N. Ganeshkumar handled the editing department, respectively, while C. J. Rajkumar was selected as the cinematographer and Erode Mahesh has written the dialogues. The film was mainly shot in Malaysia. A. Venkatesh said : "Summa Nachunu Irukku is an out and out comedy. We have just made this film to make every one laugh for 2 and a half hours".

== Soundtrack ==
Summa Nachunu Irukku

Soundtrack album by Achu Rajamani
- Released: 24 April 2013
- Recorded: 2013
- Genre: Feature film soundtrack
- Length: 17:40
- Label: Sony Music
- Producer: Achu Rajamani

The film score and the soundtrack were composed by Achu Rajamani (except Kannan Indru and Dian Dian by LockUp Nathan from Malaysia). The soundtrack features 5 tracks with lyrics written by Na. Muthukumar and Vimala Britto. The audio launch took place on 24 April 2013. G. V. Prakash Kumar, S. Thaman, Dharan Kumar, S. A. Chandrasekhar, Abirami Ramanathan, T. Rajendar, Thambi Ramaiah, Nakul, Hari Kumar, Gautham Karthik and Sneha Britto attended the function. Behindwoods.com said : "A fair commercial effort from Achu" and gave it 2 out of 5 stars.

Track listing
No.	Title	Lyrics	Singer(s)	Length
1.	"Ninaithadai Mudippavan"	Vimala Britto	Naveen Madhav, Sree Chitra	03:02
2.	"I Love You"	Na. Muthukumar	Achu Rajamani	03:12
3.	"En Aalu"	Na. Muthukumar	Achu Rajamani, T. Rajendar, S. Thaman	03:21
4.	"Kannan Indru"	Na. Muthukumar	Suchitra	04:01
5.	"Dian Dian"	Na. Muthukumar	Srilekha Parthasarathy, Velmurugan	04:04
Total length:				17:40

== Reception ==
Behindwoods.com gave it 1.5 out of 5 stars and said: "On the whole Summa Nachunu Irukku is a movie that lacks clarity on the genre it wants to fall under". M. Suganth from The Times of India gave the film 2.5 out of 5 stars and stated that "The only thing it lacks is the pizzaz to make it genuinely funny".
