= 6 Athiyayam =

- Theatrical release poster
- Directed by: Cable Sankar; Shankar Thiyagarajan; Ajayan Bala; EAV Suresh; Lokesh Rajendran; Sridhar Venkatesan
- Written by: Cable Sankar; Shankar Thiyagarajan; Ajayan Bala; EAV Suresh; Lokesh Rajendran; Sridhar Venkatesan
- Produced by: Shankar Thiyagarajan
- Starring: Thaman Kumar; S. S. Stanley; Pop Suresh; Baby Sathanya; Pasanga Kishore; Madhu Sri; Sanjeev; Gayathri; Cable Sankar; Vishnu; Francis; Vinoth Kishan; Aravind Rajagopal; Charulatha Rangarajan
- Music by: Sam C. S. (promotional song)
- Production company: Ascii Media Hut
- Release date: 23 February 2018
- Running time: 118 minutes
- Country: India
- Language: Tamil

6 Athiyayam (transl. 6 Chapters) is a 2018 Tamil-language horror anthology film directed by Cable Sankar, Shankar Thiyagarajan, Ajayan Bala, E. A. V. Suresh, Lokesh Rajendran, and Sridhar Venkatesan. It includes six separate stories, each part being directed by a different director. The film features an ensemble cast including Thaman Kumar, S. S. Stanley, Pop Suresh, Baby Sathanya, Pasanga Kishore, Madhu Sri, Sanjeev, Gayathri, Cable Sankar, Vishnu, Francis, Vinoth Kishan, Aravind Rajagopal, and Charulatha Rangarajan.

The film was produced by Shankar Thiyagarajan with a promotional song composed by Sam C. S., and lyrics by Karki Bava. The film was released on 23 February 2018.

== Anthologies ==
Role	Chapter					
Role	Super Hero	Ini Thodarum	Misai	Anamika	Soupboy Subramani	Sithiram Kolluthadi
Writer, Director	Cable Sankar	Shankar Thiyagarajan	Ajayan Bala	EAV Suresh	Lokesh Rajendran	Sridhar Venkatesan
Director of Photography	C. J. Rajkumar	C. J. Rajkumar	Pon Kasirajan	Arunmozhi Sozhan	Arunmani Palani	Mano Raja
Background Score	Silburn	Silburn	Joshua	Taj Noor	Sathish Kumar	Jose Franklin
Editor	Vijay Velukutty	Vijay Velukutty	Bala	Mani	Lokesh Rajendran	Vijay Andrews

=== Common credits ===
- Producer: Shankar Thiyagarajan
- Executive producer: Cable Sankar
- Music director: Taj Noor, Joshua, Sathish Kumar, Jose Franklin, Sam C. S.
- Choreography: Nanda
- Visual effects: V Focus Digital Media
- Director of Photography (Song): C. J. Rajkumar

== Cast ==
Super Hero	Ini Thodarum	Misai
Thaman Kumar as Subramani; S. S. Stanley	Pop Suresh as Young Guy; Baby Sathanya as Baby Ghost; Divya as Girl Ghost	Pasanga Kishore as Shakthi; Madhu Sri as Swetha; Prasanna as Friend; Adithya Kathir as Friend; Randilya as Messager Boy
Anamika	Soupboy Subramani	Sithiram Kolluthadi
Sanjeev as Karthi; Sriram Parthasarathy as Friend; Chelladurai as Old Man; Gayathri as Girl; Cable Sankar as Uncle	Vishnu as Subramani; Francis as Kopanaswami; Chandirakanta as Richa; Sangeetha as Sundaravalli; Eswari as Sarala; Eswar Vel as Swami's assistant; Karthik as Swami's assistant; Selvaraj as Swami's assistant	Vinoth Kishan; Aravind Rajagopal; Somu Sundar; Charulatha Rangarajan; Anthony Hadlee; Subramani; Aravind Balaji; Karthikeyan; Ramu; Suba Teju; Malini Sathappan

== Production ==
The film was produced by Shankar Thiyagarajan of Ascii Media Hut, for whom it is their debut production. Shankar stated he had the urge to do something experimental and pitched the idea of a horror anthology to various filmmakers, eventually getting 30 young story writers who were interested. They then shortlisted five, and with Shankar's own film, it became six short films. In addition, for most of the directors, it is their debut film, with the exception of Cable Sankar, who had previously directed Thottal Thodarum (2015). Ajayan Bala also has experience in the industry, having written the screenplay for films such as Chennaiyil Oru Naal (2013) and Manithan (2016). Shankar Thiyagaran initially titled the film Hexa, with the tagline of 6 Athiyayam, but later made the tagline the title.

== Soundtrack ==
6 Athiyayam

Soundtrack album by Sam C. S.
- Released: 30 October 2017
- Genre: Film soundtrack
- Length: 4:00
- Label: TrendMusic
- Producer: Sam C. S.

Sam C. S. chronology
Puriyatha Puthir (2017)	6 Athiyayam (2017)	Diya (2018)

The film's audio track was released on 30 October 2017. Composer Sam C. S. worked on a promotional song for the film and selected Kavitha Thomas to sing the track.

Track listing
No.	Title	Lyrics	Singer(s)	Length
1.	"Run For Your Life"	Kavitha Thomas, Karki Bhava	Kavitha Thomas, Ma Ka Pa Anand	4:00

== Reception ==
Anjana Shekar of The News Minute wrote, "if you were hoping for a few scares or perhaps for the rush that comes while watching a good horror film, you might want to reconsider this one". Karthik Kumar of Hindustan Times wrote, "6 Athiyayam, an anthology of sorts, from six directors is a brave attempt -- whacky but equally amateurish -- that can’t be easily written off". Anupama Subramanian of Deccan Chronicle wrote, "All said and done, this new attempt in Tamil cinema is a novel one, which can be appreciated". The film was also reviewed by Cinema Vikatan.
