= Arundhati (actress) =

Indian actress

- Born: Padma; Bengaluru, Karnataka, India
- Other names: Apsara, Padmavathi
- Education: Bapu Composite PU College, Bangalore
- Occupation: Actress
- Years active: 2013–present
- Television: Sun TV
- Parents: Venkatswamy (father); Geetha (mother)
- Family: Yogesh

Arundhati is an Indian actress who appears in Tamil and Kannada-language films. Arundhati made her debut in a Tamil movie Veluthu Kattu (2010) which was produced by S. A. Chandrasekhar.

== Early life ==
Arundhati was born in Bengaluru, Karnataka, India, to Venkatswamy and Geetha. She has a younger brother named Yogesh. She finished her PUC at Bapu Composite PU College in Bangalore and then started a training course as an air hostess in Bangalore.

== Career ==
Director and producer S. A. Chandrashekar spotted and approached Arundhati, then still a student, in a temple and offered her a pivotal role in the film Veluthu Kattu. The film's box office returns were average, though critics have praised her performance.

S. A. Chandrashekar gave her the screen name Arundhati, which was then adopted by the Tamil film industry. She was very choosy about her role, and this resulted in her turning down some offers until she acted in Bodinayakkanur Ganesan (2011) and Sundaattam (2013) opposite Irfan. In 2014, she appeared in a challenging role in Netru Indru as a police officer who is disguised as a prostitute. The movie did not do well at the box office.

She then appeared in the romantic thriller Thottal Thodarum (2015) opposite Thaman Kumar after playing a pivotal role in the comedy-thriller movie Naaigal Jaakirathai (2014) opposite Sibi Sathyaraj. This movie turned out to be a box office hit, and it received positive reviews from the critics. In 2016, she played the female lead in the action flick Arthanari, which was a box-office disaster. She played a role in Kaala, which had an ensemble cast. She has been signed to play the lead in Mugam, which is currently under production.

== Filmography ==
Year	Film	Role	Language	Notes
2009	Vedappan	Deepika	Tamil	
2010	Kolminchu		Kannada	
2010	Veluthu Kattu	Arukkani	Tamil	
2011	Bodinayakkanur Ganesan	Saraswathi	Tamil	
2013	Aantharya	Sharanya	Kannada	credited as Apsara
2013	Sundaattam	Kalaivani	Tamil	
2014	Agraja	Charandas's wife	Kannada	
2014	Netru Indru	Akila	Tamil	
2014	Naaigal Jaakirathai	Renuka	Tamil	
2015	Thottal Thodarum	Madhu	Tamil	
2016	Arthanari	Sathya	Tamil	
2018	Kaala	Kaala's Daughter in law	Tamil	
2019	Namma Veettu Pillai	Paari's wife	Tamil	
2022	Viruman	Kanimozhi	Tamil	

=== Television ===
2017- Gramathil Oru Naal (Sun TV)
