= Vincent Asokan =

Indian actor

- Born: Vincent Asokan; 7 October 1965 (age 61); Chennai, Madras State, India
- Occupation: Actor
- Years active: 2004–present

Vincent Asokan is an Indian actor who has predominantly appeared in Tamil language films.

== Personal life ==
Vincent is the son of actor S. A. Ashokan and nephew of actress Prameela. He is married and has two sons.

== Career ==
Vincent Asokan auditioned for roles in Kaakha Kaakha (2003) and Ghilli before making his debut in director A. Venkatesh's Aai (2004). He has since played villain in close to 30 films.

He played supporting roles in flicks like 6'2 (2005), Thotti Jaya (2005), Chanakya (2005), Bangaram (2006), Nee Venunda Chellam (2006), Thagapansamy (2006), Pokkiri (2007), Aalwar (2007) and Murugaa (2007). He won the Best Villain Award for his role in Yogi (2009).

In Ennamo Nadakkuthu, director Rajapandi cast him as a boxer. In Thalaivan, directed by Ramesh Selvan he played a very authoritative character of a don. He played a small role in the action thriller Sandamarutham (2015) which also had Sarath Kumar in dual lead roles. In director Cable Shankar's Thottal Thodarum, he achieved another pinnacle of acting by playing the role of a hired assassin with no dialogues and conveying terror via his expressions and menacing looks. Vincent also played a violent person in A. Venkatesh's Killadi (2015). He played a supporting role in a suspense-drama film Ennul Aayiram (2016). Later, he acted in Vishal's films such as Thupparivaalan (2017), Irumbu Thirai (2018) and Action (2019).

== Filmography ==
=== Tamil films ===
| Year | Title | Role | Notes |
|---|---|---|---|
| 2004 | Aai | Raghavan | |
| 2005 | 6'2 | Devaraj | |
| 2005 | Thotti Jaya | Muthu Ganesh | |
| 2005 | Chanakya | Assistant Collector | |
| 2006 | Nee Venunda Chellam | Ashok | |
| 2006 | Thagapansamy | Thakur Dass | |
| 2007 | Pokkiri | Guru | |
| 2007 | Aalwar | Punniyamoorthy's brother | |
| 2007 | Murugaa | Police inspector | |
| 2007 | Mudhal Kanave | Lavanya's brother | |
| 2008 | Sila Nerangalil | Joe / Chidambaram | First lead role |
| 2008 | Durai | Dharma | |
| 2009 | Yogi | Lindon Fernando | |
| 2010 | Kutty | Muthu | |
| 2010 | Vallakottai | Sethupathi | |
| 2011 | Velayudham | Ulaganathan's brother | |
| 2011 | Vithagan | | |
| 2014 | Eppodhum Vendraan | Cop | |
| 2014 | Ennamo Nadakkuthu | Boxer | |
| 2014 | Thalaivan | Don | |
| 2015 | Sandamarutham | Thamarai Chandran | |
| 2015 | Thottal Thodarum | Assassin | |
| 2015 | Killadi | Bhavani | |
| 2016 | Ennul Aayiram | | |
| 2017 | Yevanavan | | |
| 2017 | Neruppu Da | Sadha | |
| 2017 | Thupparivaalan | Diwakar | |
| 2018 | Irumbu Thirai | Minister | |
| 2018 | Tik Tik Tik | D. Raghuram | |
| 2018 | Vada Chennai | ACP | |
| 2018 | Maari 2 | Gangadhar Beeja's brother | |
| 2019 | Nethraa | Ravi | |
| 2019 | Action | Deepak Mehta | |
| 2021 | Laabam | | |
| 2021 | Aranmanai 3 | Durai | |
| 2021 | Pon Manickavel | Thilak | |
| 2022 | Kadamaiyai Sei | Dharmarajan | |
| 2022 | Captain | Major Krishnamoorthy | |
| 2023 | Paramporul | | |
| 2023 | Sooragan | Sethu | |
| 2024 | Operation Laila | Principal | |
| 2024 | Vettaikkari | Mudhalali | |
| 2024 | Viduthalai Part 2 | Mahalakshmi's father | |

=== Other language films ===
| Year | Title | Role | Language |
|---|---|---|---|
| 2005 | By the People | Paramasivam | Malayalam |
| 2006 | Bangaram | Shankar Singh | Telugu |
| 2010 | The Thriller | Anil / RDX Anil | Malayalam |
| 2012 | Rebel | Varadan | Telugu |
| 2013 | Lakshmi | | Kannada |
| 2023 | Amigos | Mohan Pandey | Telugu |
| 2023 | Agent | RAW officer | Telugu |
| 2025 | They Call Him OG | David Abraham | Telugu |

=== Television ===
| Year | Title | Channel | Notes |
|---|---|---|---|
| 2012 | Nambikkai | Sun TV | |
| 2018 | Maya | Sun TV | |
| 2021 | Kuruthi Kalam | MX Player | |

=== Web series ===
| Year | Title | Language | Platform | Notes |
|---|---|---|---|---|
| 2020 | Singa Penne | Tamil | ZEE5 | |
