= Pelli Sambandham =

- Theatrical release poster
- Directed by: K. Raghavendra Rao
- Screenplay by: Paruchuri Brothers
- Story by: A. Venkatesh (director)
- Based on: Pooparika Varugirom (Tamil)
- Produced by: K. Raghavendra Rao; C. Aswini Dutt
- Starring: Akkineni Nageswara Rao; Sumanth; Sakshi Shivanand; Sanghavi
- Cinematography: V. Jayaram
- Edited by: Kotagiri Venkateswara Rao
- Music by: S. A. Rajkumar
- Production company: Sri Sai Raghavendra Movies
- Release date: 27 July 2000
- Country: India
- Language: Telugu

Pelli Sambandham (transl. Marriage Alliance) is a 2000 Indian Telugu-language comedy-drama film, produced by C. Aswini Dutt and K. Raghavendra Rao and directed by K. Raghavendra Rao. It stars Akkineni Nageswara Rao, Sumanth, Sakshi Shivanand, Sanghavi, with music composed by S. A. Rajkumar. The film is a remake of the Tamil language film Pooparika Varugirom (1999).

== Cast ==
- Akkineni Nageswara Rao as Sitaramayya / Kaasi
- Sumanth
- Sakshi Shivanand
- Sanghavi
- Raghuvaran
- Kota Srinivasa Rao
- Brahmanandam
- Tanikella Bharani
- M. S. Narayana
- A.V.S
- Brahmaji
- Raja Ravindra
- Prasad Babu
- Raghunatha Reddy
- Sudha
- Priya
- Varsha
- Delhi Rajeshwari
- Kalpana Rai

== Soundtrack ==
Pelli Sambandham

Soundtrack album by S. A. Rajkumar
- Released: 2000
- Length: 28:34
- Label: Supreme Audio
- Producer: S. A. Rajkumar

S. A. Rajkumar chronology
| Chinna (2000) | Pelli Sambandham (2000) | Ninne Premistha (2000) |

All music is composed by S. A. Rajkumar

| No. | Title | Lyrics | Singer(s) | Length |
|---|---|---|---|---|
| 1. | "Bhale Baagundi" | Chandrabose | Rajesh, Sujatha | 4:29 |
| 2. | "Achi Buchi" | Suddala Ashok Teja | Rajesh, Swarnalatha | 4:16 |
| 3. | "Ammammo" | Chandrabose | Hariharan, Swarnalatha | 4:29 |
| 4. | "Thalapaaga Nethina" | Chandrabose | S. P. Balasubrahmanyam, K. S. Chithra | 4:21 |
| 5. | "Aadapilla" | Chandrabose | P. Unnikrishnan, Sujatha | 4:52 |
| 6. | "Edo Edo" | Chandrabose | Partha Sarathy, Febiyaani | 4:20 |
| 7. | "Pakkumantu" | Sirivennela Seetharama Sastry | Chorus | 1:47 |
| Total length: | | | | 28:34 |

== Reception ==
A critic from Full Hyderabad wrote that "Pelli Sambhandam goes one step ahead and meanders aimlessly for two and a half hours". Indiainfo wrote "Though the film is intended to give a good break to Sumanth, it is grandfather Nageswara Rao who steals the show, followed by Raghuvaran and Kota. Sumanth, who showed some promise in his debut film Premakatha, however, falls flat as an actor in Pellisambhandham . Raghavendra Rao’s obsession with the navels and bosoms of his heroines is intact in this movie too. S A Rajkumar’s music is a disappointment".
