= Jenma Natchathiram =

2025 Tamil supernatural horror film

- Theatrical release poster
- Directed by: B. Manivarman
- Written by: B. Manivarman
- Produced by: K. Subhashini; K G Ratheesh
- Starring: Taman Akshaan; Malvi Malhotra
- Cinematography: K G Ratheesh
- Edited by: S. Guru Suriya
- Music by: Sanjay Manickam
- Production companies: Amoham Studios; Whitelamp Pictures
- Distributed by: Romeo Pictures
- Release date: 18 July 2025
- Running time: 118 minutes
- Country: India
- Language: Tamil

Jenma Natchathiram (transl. Birth star) is a 2025 Indian Tamil-language supernatural horror thriller film written and directed by B. Manivarman, starring Taman Akshaan, Malvi Malhotra, Maithreya, Raksha Cherin in the lead roles, alongside Sivam, Arun Karthi, Kaali Venkat, Munishkanth, Vela Ramamoorthy, Thalaivasal Vijay, Santhana Bharathi and Yasar in pivotal roles. The film is produced by K. Subhashini under Amoham Studios and Whitelamp Pictures banners. The film was released to negative reviews.

== Plot ==
The plot revolves around four friends. They are a married aspiring director, his friend with his girlfriend, and the director's wife, who is constantly having satanic dreams. One day they find a dying man who stole money from a politician for his daughter's surgery.

== Cast ==
- Taman Akshaan as Ajay
- Malvi Malhotra as Riya
- Maithreya as Vino
- Raksha Cherin as Suji
- Sivam as Jana
- Arun Karthi as Prakash
- Karthi SriKumar as Selvam
- Kaali Venkat as Rajesh
- Munishkanth as Murugesan
- Vela Ramamoorthy as MLA Velayudham
- Thalaivasal Vijay as Dr. Seeman
- Santhana Bharathi as Film producer
- Yasar as Shakti
- Nakkalites Niveditaa as Ghost

== Production ==
After Oru Nodi (2024), director B. Manivarman was announced to reunite with Taman Akshaan in a supernatural horror thriller film, through a first-look poster in mid-May 2025. Malvi Malhotra made her Tamil debut through this film. The film is produced by K. Subhashini under Amoham Studios and Whitelamp Pictures banners, while the technical team consists of cinematographer KG, editor S. Guru Suriya, music composer Sanjay Manickam, art director SJ Ram and stunt choreographer Miracle Michael. The film's lead actor Thaman Kumar was rechristened as Taman Akshaan for the film.

== Music ==
The film had music composed by Sanjay Manickam.

== Release ==
Jenma Natchathiram released in theatres on 18 July 2025. The Tamil Nadu and worldwide theatrical rights were acquired by Romeo Pictures.

== Reception ==
Harshini SV of The Times of India gave 2/5 stars and wrote, "With Jenma Natchathiram, the film doesn’t just fumble the balance—it seems confused about what genres it even wants to play with." Akshay Kumar of Cinema Express gave 1/5 stars and wrote, "What makes the film irredeemable is that it fails to even provide the basic joys of this genre in pursuit of something lofty, and there's no luck on that front either."
