= Naaigal Jaakirathai =

2014 Indian film by Shakti Soundar Rajan

- Film poster
- Directed by: Shakti Soundar Rajan
- Written by: Shakti Soundar Rajan
- Produced by: Sathyaraj; Maheswari Sathyaraj
- Starring: Sibiraj; Arundhati
- Cinematography: Nizar Shafi
- Edited by: Praveen K. L.
- Music by: Dharan Kumar
- Production company: Nathambal Film Factory
- Distributed by: Cosmo Village
- Release date: 21 November 2014
- Running time: 114 minutes
- Country: India
- Language: Tamil

Naaigal Jaakirathai (transl. Beware of Dogs) is a 2014 Indian Tamil-language comedy thriller film written and directed by Shakti Soundar Rajan featuring Sibiraj, Arundhati and a German Shepherd dog named Idoh in the lead. It is inspired from the 1989 film Turner & Hooch. The film was produced by Sibiraj's father Sathyaraj under the banner Nathambal Film Factory. The music was composed by Dharan Kumar, cinematography was handled by Nizar Shifi and edited by Praveen K. L.

Naaigal Jaakirathai was released on 21 November 2014 and was one of the most profitable ventures of 2014. The film follows a police officer who, with the help of a military dog, seeks to rescue his kidnapped wife.

== Plot ==
A gang has kidnapped a girl and several police officers, including Karthik (Sibiraj), who is attempting to rescue her. During a shootout, one man from the gang and a police officer named Arul Das (Raghav Umasrinivasan), who is a good friend of Karthik, are killed, while Karthik gets injured. He is put out of action and suffers from post traumatic stress disorder.

Subramani (Idoh) is a trained military dog who has the potential to nab culprits and decipher crime scenes. After its owner, an army officer, is shot dead, Subramani is returned to the officer's father in Coimbatore, who is a neighbor of Karthik. The neighbor leaves the town and requests Karthik to provide shelter to Subramani during his absence. Karthik denies the request but provides shelter after seeing Subramani being troubled by the small kids in the neighborhood. Karthik learns about Subramani and becomes good friends with him.

Meanwhile, Karthik's wife Renuka (Arundhati) is abducted by Anbu Das (Balaji Venugopal), the head of the kidnapping ring, and is buried alive inside a coffin. A web camera is attached into the coffin, and the live stream is provided to Karthik. Karthik learns that Renuka can breathe for about six hours. Renuka speaks to Anbu, and with the help of a deaf and dumb teacher, Karthik deciphers what Renuka had conveyed. Suddenly, water trickles into the coffin, and Karthik concludes that it has to be rainwater. He, Subramani, and his cop friend travel to Ooty, the only place in Tamil Nadu where it was raining at the moment.

Anbu had kidnapped Renuka to avenge the death of his brother, who was not the man from his gang, but Arul, who worked as a mole in the police department. Karthik is then hit by a metal rod and is also buried in a coffin. Subramani sniffs out Anbu and his henchmen. While Anbu can escape to a tree house, his henchmen get bitten by Subramani, who saves Karthik by digging a pit. Anbu gets hold of a gun and shoots at Subramani, injuring him fatally, before Karthik manages to outwit and defeat Anbu in a fight. Before dying, Subramani had marked the place where Renuka is buried, and Karthik saved her, while Anbu has been buried alive in the same manner.

Subramani has gotten offspring, and Karthik is given one of the puppies. The movie ends with a scene where Karthik and his new dog, who has been named Chinnamani in Subramani's memory, are being entrusted with investigating a new case.

== Cast ==
- Sibiraj as Inspector Karthik Chinnamalai
- Arundhati as Renuka
- Idoh (Dog) as Subramani
- Balaji Venugopal as Anbu Das
- Manobala as Pichumani
- Mayilsamy as Dog Owner
- Prinz Nithik as Arunachalam
- Venkat Sundar as Appu
- Raghav Umasrinivasan as Arul Das
- Maheswaran Muthusamy as Rajesh
- Abimanyu Nallamuthu as Selvam
- Aroul D. Shankar as Kidnapped Girl's father
- Varsha as Vidya
- Mayilvaganan as Bharani
- Sounder as Emu Owner
- Anbu as Logu
- Arunachalam as Senior Doctor
- Chenthu Mohan as Army Officer

== Production ==
After Naanayam, Sibi Sathyaraj was on the lookout for a script for his next film. Since nothing interesting turned up, he took a brief hiatus, still reading scripts. Sibiraj is a dog-lover and has 3 dogs. So, he expressed his eagerness in working with animals in a film. Director Shakti S. Rajan, who had earlier directed Sibiraj in Naanayam, came up with a script with a dog in the lead. The film was formally announced in July 2013, with a military trained canine described as the main character. Apart from playing the hero, the dog would also do several action sequences and comedy tracks in the film. Arundhati of Sundaattam fame was signed as the female lead. The crew was on the lookout for a trained dog, preferably a German Shepherd. After a search, they found a dog from Bangalore. Filming began on 9 October 2013. The story takes place in Coimbatore, and travels to Ooty, Palakkad and Chennai.

== Soundtrack ==
Naaigal Jaakirathai

Soundtrack album by Dharan Kumar
- Released: 1 September 2014
- Recorded: 2014
- Genre: Feature film soundtrack
- Length: 18:39
- Language: Tamil
- Label: Saregama
- Producer: Dharan Kumar

Dharan Kumar chronology
Aaha Kalyanam (2013)	Naaigal Jaakirathai (2014)	Kaaval (2015)

Singles from Naaigal Jaakirathai
- 1. "Doggy Style" Released: 27 August 2014

The soundtrack album was composed by Dharan Kumar while the lyrics were written by Yugabharathi and Madhan Karky. A single track "Doggy Style" was released on 27 August 2014. The album was launched in Chennai on 1 September 2014.

No.	Title	Lyrics	Singer(s)	Length
1.	"Doggy Style"	Madhan Karky	Gana Bala	3:24
2.	"En Nenjil"	Madhan Karky	Naresh Iyer	4:58
3.	"Oyaathe"	Yugabharathi	Haricharan, Dharan Kumar	3:55
4.	"Man's Best Friend" (Theme Music)	—	Instrumental	2:42
5.	"Doggy Style" (Club Mix)	Madhan Karky	Gana Bala	3:37
Total length:				18:39

Karthik of Milliblog stated "Dharan hasn’t been in the best of forms recently and Naaigal Jaakirathai’s soundtrack is no exception." Behindframes gave 3 out of 5 and stated "Cool, peppy and enjoyable tracks by Dharan."

== Reception ==
=== Critical reception ===
The Times of India gave the film 3.5 stars out of 5 and wrote, "Naaigal Jaakirathai's success lies in how cannily Soundar Rajan gives us a thriller that also feels light. But there is a bit of spoon-feeding in the form of exposition that is necessary but sticks out on screen because of how it is presented". Rediff gave 2.5 stars out of 5 and wrote, "Whatever its faults, director Shakti Soundar Rajan's Naaigal Jaakirathai is a decent fun-filled entertainer". The New Indian Express wrote, "The uncomplicated tale of a man and his dog may have its glitches. But it’s refreshing in its premise and has many charming moments".

The Hindu wrote, "You wouldn’t perhaps begrudge the makers their ‘influences’ if the result was a film we generally don't see a lot of, but Naaigal reneges on the promise of its first portions". Sify stated "Naaigal Jaakirathai is a film where the idea sounds good but falls short in execution. Shakti Soundar Rajan’s idea of making an investigation thriller along with the fun elements of a dog is laudable but what lacks in the film is detailing of characters".

=== Box office ===
On 8 December 2014, trade analyst Sreedhar Pillai reported that the film, made on a budget of ₹ 4 crores, had grossed ₹ 7.25 crores to that point.

== Sequel ==
After the film became a commercial success, Shakti Soundar Rajan informed that he had plans to make a sequel to Naaigal Jaakirathai. It might feature Sibiraj and the dog, as well as the lead characters from the first part, and is scheduled to commence in 2020.
