= Aai (2004 film) =

- Poster
- Directed by: A. Venkatesh
- Written by: Pattukkottai Prabakar (dialogues)
- Screenplay by: A. Venkatesh
- Story by: A. Venkatesh
- Produced by: K. Parthiban
- Starring: Sarathkumar; Namitha
- Cinematography: A. Venkatesh
- Edited by: V. T. Vijayan
- Music by: Srikanth Deva
- Production company: Thiruvalluvar Kalaikoodam
- Release date: 17 December 2004
- Running time: 162 minutes
- Country: India
- Language: Tamil

Aai (/eɪ/ transl. Hey!) is a 2004 Indian Tamil-language action film directed by A. Venkatesh. The film stars Sarathkumar and Namitha, with Vadivelu, Kalabhavan Mani, Ashish Vidyarthi, Kota Srinivasa Rao, and Vincent Asokan in supporting roles. It was released on 17 December 2004.

== Plot ==
Sakthivel, alias Velu, leads a peaceful life in Palani, selling home appliances on his bicycle. He resides with his sister Lakshmi and their friend Pazhani. Velu deliberately avoids confrontations and trouble. Velu falls in love with Anjali after an encounter on a bus. Initially, Anjali feigns disinterest, but eventually, she reciprocates Velu's feelings. Anjali encourages Velu to expand his business by taking a loan to establish a gym. Velu's life becomes a turning point when he witnesses Raghavan committing a murder. Despite being an eyewitness, Velu declines to report the incident to the police, fearing repercussions. However, when Raghavan harasses a college girl, Lakshmi intervenes, and Raghavan becomes infatuated with her. He forces Lakshmi to marry him, prompting Velu to confront Raghavan and his accomplices, including a corrupt police inspector. Anjali, perplexed by Velu's sudden display of bravery, confronts him about his initial reluctance to report the murder. Velu's actions, she argues, were selfish, as he only intervened to protect Lakshmi. In a surprising revelation, Lakshmi discloses that she is not Velu's sister, but rather the sister of Velu's close friend, Mani.

A flashback reveals Velu's past as a military officer. During a holiday, Velu returns to Chennai to visit his friend Mani and his sister Lakshmi. Upon arrival, he witnesses Inspector Eswara Pandian misbehaving with a North Indian woman. Velu intervenes, but the enraged inspector, despite knowing Velu's military background, falsely charges him with several crimes and imprisons him. Velu, however, fights back and escapes from the police station. Velu, accompanied by his police friend Mani, meets with the Director-General of Police (DGP) to discuss the rampant corruption within the department. However, the DGP admits his powerlessness in addressing the issue. Undeterred, Velu and Mani embark on a mission to eradicate corruption within the police department. Disguising themselves, they target corrupt officials, using unorthodox methods to reform them.

One day, Mani discovers a wine shop operating opposite the school where his fiancée, Kanmani, teaches. Mani, Kanmani, Velu, and the schoolchildren collectively destroy the wine shop, with Velu setting it ablaze. The shop's owner, Naachiyar, vows to retaliate by destroying the school. Velu, however, warns Naachiyar that he will be dealt with before he can harm the school. Naachiyar, unfazed, devises a plan to bomb the school. Velu and Mani receive a distress call from Kanmani and rush to the school, managing to save the children and Kanmani. Tragically, Mani is fatally stabbed by one of Naachiyar's henchmen and falls from the school building. As Mani lies dying, he expresses his desire to see his sister become a collector. Velu vows to fulfill this wish but to seek vengeance for Mani's demise, Velu apprehends Naachiyar and shoots him twice. It is also revealed that Velu had been living in hiding, keeping a low profile to safeguard Lakshmi from Naachiyar's wrath. Though the military court declared Velu innocent of all charges, Velu voluntarily resigned from the military to assume responsibility for fulfilling Mani's dying wish: to support Lakshmi in becoming a collector.

In the present day, Naachiyar, driven by a thirst for vengeance, finally tracks down Velu in Palani. Seeking revenge for the past shooting, Naachiyar allies with Eswara Pandian, now a Deputy Superintendent of Police (DSP), and Raghavan to eliminate Velu. During the Thaipoosam festival celebrations at the Palani temple, Velu is ambushed and shot by Naachiyar. However, Velu swiftly tends to his wounds and launches a fierce counterattack amidst the crowded temple grounds. Ensuring Anjali, Pazhani, and Lakshmi's safety, Velu sends them home before focusing on killing Eswara Pandian, and Naachiyar. Years later, Velu is released from prison after serving his sentence for the killings. Lakshmi has realized Mani's dream and is now a collector.

== Cast ==
- Sarathkumar as Sakthivelu "Velu"
- Namitha as Anjali, Sakthivelu's love interest
- Vadivelu as Pazhani
- Kalabhavan Mani as Mani, Velu's best friend
- Kota Srinivasa Rao as Naachiyar
- Vincent Asokan as Raghavan
- Ashish Vidyarthi as Dindigul DSP Easwara Pandian
- Thalaivasal Vijay as an Inspector in Palani
- Vijayakumar as a DGP
- Thyagu as Inspector Vavval Pandi
- Ponnambalam as Inspector Kalyanaraman
- Ilavarasu as Traffic Constable Subbarayan
- Mayoori as Kanmani, Mani's wife
- Rithika as Lakshmi, Mani's sister
- Paravai Muniyamma as Anjali's grandmother
- Bonda Mani as an auto driver
- Crane Manohar as a customer
- Scissor Manohar as a pickpocket
- Joker Thulasi as a bus conductor
- Manager Cheena as a post office customer
- Tirupur Ramasamy as a post office customer
- Kottai Perumal as a police constable
- Kovai Senthil as Achari
- Rangammal
- Priyanka as a widow
- Bava Lakshmanan as Ganapathi
- Bayilvan Ranganathan as a relative
- M. Seenivasan
- Jayamani
- Kumaresan
- Vengal Rao as a costume lender
- Vijay Ganesh
- Robo Shankar as Army Man (uncredited role)
- Mumtaj as a belly dancer (special appearance)

== Soundtrack ==
The soundtrack was composed by Srikanth Deva.

Track listing
No.	Title	Lyrics	Singer(s)	Length
1.	"Arjuna Arjuna"	Kalaikumar	Udit Narayan, Sophia Salam	5:13
2.	"Ooru Onu Onuu"	Vaali	R. Sarathkumar, Vadivelu, Anuradha Sriram, Paravai Muniyamma, Jaishree	5:27
3.	"Aai Mailapuru"	Pa. Vijay	Manikka Vinayagam, Sabesh, Ganga, Suchitra	5:18
4.	"Meyau Meyau"	Kalaikumar	Srikanth Deva, Sadhana Sargam	5:18
5.	"Neathi Adida Aai"	Vaali	Javed Ali, Palakkad Sreeram, Gopal Sharma, Kumar, Suchitra	5:03
6.	"Veluthu Kattu"	Vaali	Shankar Mahadevan	5:50
Total length:				32:09

== Release and reception ==
Due to the producer's financial crunch, Aai was released on 17 December 2004, after a four-month delay. S. R. Ashok Kumar of The Hindu wrote, "The dialogue of Pattukkottai Prabhakar is powerful [...] A. Venkatesh who is also responsible for the story, screenplay and direction has made the film interesting with his gripping narration". Malini Mannath of Chennai Online wrote, "It's a rehash of so many earlier films [..] – that one loses count of the 'inspirations'! There's nothing fresh by way of script or narrative style here. As for Sharat, though he plays the angry man with a vengeance, it's what he's done in his earlier films". Visual Dasan of Kalki wrote 'when public does wrong the police retorts, who will retort if police does wrong', this one line plot is backed up by a screenplay with love, action and comedy which saves the film from faltering. At the same time the lengthy climax towards the end gives a headache.

Cinesouth wrote "The director Venkatesh, thinking that he is taking the film in an fast paced manner had ended up in giving a confused treatment to the whole story. Had he tried to think calmly and clearly about each and every sequence, a different kind of movie would have emerged. But it seems he had given in to the suggestions of his assistants during 'drunken session called story discussion', results in a kind of movie that is tepid and not at all up to the mark". Sify wrote "Aei caters to the B and C centres, as Sarath turns into a Rambo in the climax which has enough high octane action to keep the front benchers happy along with an item number from Mumtaz and glamour from Namitha. Vadivelu rehashes his own old comedy tracks and Kalabhavan Mani hams. The music of Srikanth Deva is a big letdown as there is no hummble tune in the film. Sarath is 100 percent convincing with his great physique and body language. He is deadly in action scenes and the film is strictly for undemanding action fans!". Deccan Herald wrote, "Sarath Kumar’s films have always something in them for everyone. But this one is a total washout as it is a rehash of many earlier films including some of his own movies. While the narrative and the script are stale, there is nothing to look forward to in terms of performance also. The only exception is comedian Vadivelu who breathes some life."
