= Chattaniki Kallu Levu =

- Theatrical release poster
- Directed by: S. A. Chandrasekhar
- Screenplay by: S. A. Chandrasekhar
- Based on: Sattam Oru Iruttarai (1981)
- Starring: Chiranjeevi; Madhavi; Lakshmi; Hema Sundar; Kannada Prabhakar
- Music by: Krishna–Chakra
- Release date: 30 October 1981
- Running time: 141 minutes
- Country: India
- Language: Telugu

Chattaniki Kallu Levu (transl. The Law Does Not Have Eyes) is a 1981 Indian Telugu-language vigilante action film directed by S. A. Chandrasekhar. The film stars Chiranjeevi, Madhavi, Lakshmi, Hema Sundar and Kannada Prabhakar in important roles. It is a remake of Chandrasekhar's 1981 Tamil film Sattam Oru Iruttarai. The film was released on 30 October 1981 and became a commercial success.

== Plot ==
Siblings Vijay (Chiranjeevi) and Durga (Lakshmi) are in pursuit of their sister's and father's murderers. Their father and sister were killed by three men, John (Hema Sundar), Javed (Kannada Prabhakar) and Janardan (Ceylon Manohar). Durga, now a police officer, wants the murderers to be punished legally. But, Vijay thinks that law and its loopholes can never track down the three murderers. So, he decides to track them down by himself and succeeds in killing John and Janardhan. This frustrates his sister and interrupts her investigations. She suspects Vijay, but due to lack of evidence remains helpless. In the end, Durga, trying to nab Javed, is kidnapped by him, but Vijay saves her and kills Javed.

== Cast ==
- Chiranjeevi as Vijay
- Madhavi as Rekha
- Lakshmi as Inspector Durga
- Pandari Bai as Vijay and Durga's mother
- Ramana Murthy as Seshaiah
- Hema Sundar as Jagannath
- Kannada Prabhakar as Javed
- Ceylon Manohar as John
- Prabhakar Reddy as Police Chief
- Narayana Rao as Ranga
- Mada Venkateswara Rao as Simhachalam
- Sarathi as Constable
- Raavi Kondala Rao as Police Inspector
- P. J. Sarma as Jailer Ananda Rao

== Soundtrack ==
The music was composed by Krishna–Chakra.

1. "Chattaniki Kallu"
2. "Evvariki Chappoddu"
3. "Kalisipo Na"
4. "Ee Sogase"
