= Maha Prabhu =

- Poster
- Directed by: A. Venkatesh
- Written by: A. Venkatesh; Pattukkottai Prabakar (dialogues)
- Produced by: Janaki Devi; G. K. Reddy (presenter)
- Starring: R. Sarathkumar; Sukanya; Vineetha
- Cinematography: D. Vijayagopal
- Edited by: B. Lenin; V. T. Vijayan
- Music by: Deva
- Production company: Sri Sai Theja Films
- Release date: 26 January 1996
- Running time: 144 minutes
- Country: India
- Language: Tamil

Maha Prabhu is a 1996 Indian Tamil-language masala film directed by A. Venkatesh (credited as A. Venkatesan), making his directorial debut. The film stars R. Sarathkumar, Sukanya and Vineetha. It was released on 26 January 1996.

== Plot ==
Shanmugavel, a corrupt and influential politician, is operating with impunity, and even the police can't touch him for his crimes. His son Bhaskar is spreading terror among college students and professors, doing dirty work like killings for his father's illegal trades. Bhaskar attempts to kill honest minister Deivamurugan by implanting a bomb, but it ends up killing another politician instead. Bhaskar's men then direct the minister to hoist a flag, and despite the tight security provided by honest police officer Eswarapandiyan, they manage to kill the minister.

Meanwhile, Dhamodaran "Dhamu" is selling black cinema tickets alongside his friends Sethu and Vicky. Dhamu is known for being an angry man who frequently fights with the government for basic amenities in his slum. Jothi, Dhamu's neighbour, is in love with him, but he doesn't reciprocate her feelings. Mahalakshmi "Maha", an orphan, moves into the house opposite Dhamu's and joins as a lecturer in the college where Bhaskar is causing trouble. Bhaskar verbally humiliates Maha on her first day, while Dhamu develops feelings for her. When Dhamu comes to drop Maha off at college, Bhaskar and Dhamu clash, and Bhaskar sends his goons to attack Dhamu. However, Dhamu subdues them all. Dhamu's mother, Vellaiyamma, asks him to leave violence, and he promises to do so.

Dhamu then attempts to propose to Maha, and she expresses her desire for a husband like him. Inspired, Dhamu leaves his black ticket-selling business and mends his ways, impressing Maha. He starts working at a two-wheeler mechanic shop. As Dhamu and Maha's love grows, Jothi sacrifices her love for Dhamu and decides to marry another man. Eswarapandiyan confronts Shanmugavel, determined to arrest him for the brutal rape and murder of a girl. In retaliation, Shanmugavel brutally kills Eswarapandiyan's wife, Uma, in front of him. Shanmugavel spares Eswarapandiyan's life but cuts off one of his legs, intending to intimidate other police officers. Meanwhile, Bhaskar loses the college's chairman election and mistakenly assumes that Maha motivated students not to vote for him. Seeking revenge, Bhaskar announces that he'll publicly molest Maha. Fearing Bhaskar's wrath, Maha takes a few days' leave from college. Unable to share her fears with Dhamu, who has promised his mother to avoid violence, Maha considers leaving town.

However, Dhamu stops her and decides to fight Bhaskar, supported by his mother, Vellaiyamma. When Bhaskar and his henchmen arrive to molest Maha, the corrupt police officer removes Dhamu from the scene. Vellaiyamma tries to protect Maha but is beaten and pushed into a sewer. In a desperate bid to protect her modesty, Maha sets herself on fire. Dhamu escapes from police custody and rushes to the scene, only to discover the dead bodies of Maha and Vellaiyamma. Consumed by rage, Dhamu brutally beats and kills Bhaskar by suffocating him in the sewer and burning his half-dead body. Dhamu is later arrested by the police and subjected to torture in custody. Shanmugavel taunts Dhamu, challenging him to kill him. However, Eswarapandiyan saves Dhamu from police custody, and they team up with others who have suffered at Shanmugavel's hands. Together, they start detonating and ruining Shanmugavel's illegal properties. Shanmugavel seeks protection from the DGP, but Eswarapandiyan kidnaps the DGP at gunpoint and confronts Shanmugavel at his industry.

A violent shootout ensues between Dhamu and Shanmugavel's henchmen, and Dhamu manages to overpower them and hold Shanmugavel captive. Dhamu questions the police about whether a corrupt and influential person like Shanmugavel would be punished by the law, but the police remain silent. In the end, Dhamu kills Shanmugavel in public, avenging the deaths of his mother and lover, Maha. Simultaneously, Eswarapandiyan shoots Shanmugavel, avenging the death of his wife, Uma, and the mutilation of his leg.

== Cast ==
- R. Sarathkumar as Dhamodaran "Dhamu"
- Sukanya as Mahalakshmi "Maha"
- Vineetha as Jothi
- Manorama as Vellaiyamma, Dhamu's mother
- Sarath Babu as Eswarapandiyan
- Goundamani as Sethu
- Senthil as Vicky
- Rajan P. Dev as Shanmugavel
- Vaishnavi as Uma, Eswarapandiyan's wife
- Shiju as Bhaskar (credited as Vishal)
- Kannan as a Chief minister
- Samikannu as Shanmugavel's servant
- Ennatha Kannaiya as a politician
- Ajay Rathnam as a corrupt inspector
- K. K. Soundar as Jothi's father
- Kumarimuthu as Gnana Kannan
- Kovai Senthil as a salesman
- Nellai Siva as a local politician
- Master Mahendran as a young boy in the slum
- Vikram Krishna in a cameo appearance as a visitor in the theatre (uncredited)
- Alphonsa as Saroja, a dancer in the song "Kadalai Enna" (uncredited)

== Production ==
Despite the film I Love India (1993) failing at the box-office, star Sarathkumar decided to collaborate again with the same producer for another film which eventually became Maha Prabhu. The film marked the directorial debut of A. Venkatesh and it was reported to be based on a real life event which happened when he worked as a reporter for Maalai Malar.

== Soundtrack ==
The music was composed by Deva, with lyrics written by Vaali.

Song	Singer(s)	Duration
"Baava Vaa"	S. Janaki, Shahul Hameed	4:39
"Jackie Chan"	K. S. Chithra, Mano	6:02
"Kadalai Enna"	Gangai Amaran, S. Janaki	4:43
"Myna, Myna"	S. Janaki, S. P. Balasubrahmanyam, G. V. Prakash Kumar	4:55
"Missy Missy Dol"	Mano, Swarnalatha	4:20
"Sollavaa"	S. P. Balasubrahmanyam, Sunandha	4:03

== Critical reception ==
D. S. Ramanujam of The Hindu wrote, "The action sequences are tightly edited (Lenin and V. T. Vijayan) and framed (camera: T. Vijayagopal) right from the start and the screenplay of the director, backed by his dialogue, make it worth the time".

== Legacy ==
Senthil's dialogue "No Comments Simbly Waste" entered Tamil vernacular, often used by people when tired of responding to questions.
