= Malvi Malhotra =

Indian actress

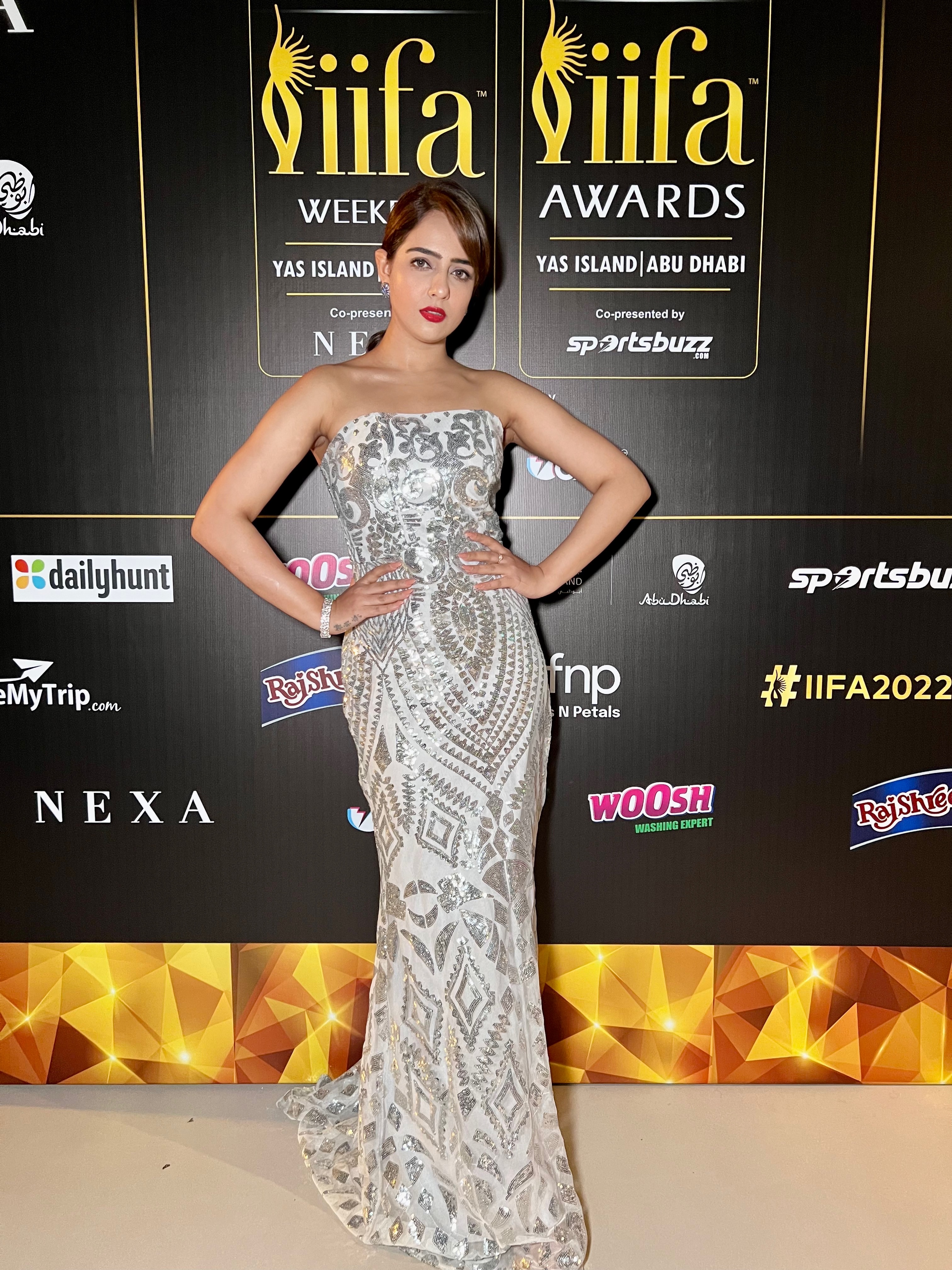
- Born: 22 May 2000 (age 26); Mandi, Himachal Pradesh, India
- Education: University of Mumbai
- Occupations: Actress, writer
- Years active: 2017–present
- Parent(s): Sushil Malhotra, Bandana Malhotra

Malvi Malhotra is an Indian actress and writer who predominantly works in Telugu, Hindi, Malayalam, Tamil films and theatre. Malhotra made her acting debut with Hindi TV Serial Udann in 2017 and entered Hindi cinema with the comedy-drama film Hotel Milan (2018).

== Early life ==
Malvi Malhotra was born (Father: Sushil Malhotra, Mother: Bandana Malhotra) in a Punjabi family in Mandi, Himachal Pradesh. Malvi studied in Chandigarh and later completed her master's in computer science at Mumbai University.

== Career ==
Malhotra's first acting role as an adult came with Hindi TV Serial Udann in 2017. She has also participated in a movie titled Hotel Milan. In 2025, Malhotra published the Hindi poetry collection Alfaaz Sitaaron Jaise through Korak, an imprint of Rajkamal Prakashan.

== Filmography ==
=== Films ===
Key
†	Denotes films that have not yet been released

Year	Title	Role	Language	Notes	Ref
2017	Udann	Pooja	Hindi	Television	
2018	Hotel Milan	Sapna	Hindi	Debut	
2022	Tamas	Vidya	Hindi	Short Film	
2023	Zorawar Di Jacqueline		Hindi	OTT Film	
2023	Abhyuham		Malayalam		
2024	Haye Bibiye Kithe Fas Gaye		Punjabi	Horror comedy	
2024	Tiragabadara Saami	Sailaja	Telugu		
2025	Jenma Natchathiram	Riya	Tamil		
2026	Baa Baa Black Sheep†		Telugu	Scheduled for release on 9 October 2026	
2026	Dama Dum Mast Kalandar		Punjabi		
TBA	Arjun Bewakoof†			Upcoming	

=== Music videos ===
Year	Title	Singer	Language	Notes	Ref
2022	Dance Soniye	Inder Dosanj	Punjabi		
2023	Darshan Deja Ni	Anmol Dhandra	Punjabi		
2023	Galbaat	Shobi Sarwan	Hindi	Zee Music	
2023	Karobar	R Nait	Punjabi		
2023	Shining Star	Jaisurya	Punjabi		
2023	Dhol Wajda	Dil Sandhu	Punjabi		
2023	AAKHEIN KAJAL	Shekhar Khanijo	Hindi		
2023	Sohni mutiyaar	Jaskaran Riarr	Punjabi		
