= Pooparika Varugirom =

1999 Indian film

- Theatrical release poster
- Directed by: A. Venkatesh
- Written by: A. Venkatesh
- Produced by: P. Srinivas
- Starring: Sivaji Ganesan; Ajay; Malavika
- Cinematography: Vijay Milton
- Edited by: Saleem; B. S. Vasu
- Music by: Vidyasagar
- Production company: Aishwarya Film Makers
- Release date: 17 September 1999
- Country: India
- Language: Tamil

Pooparika Varugirom (transl. We are coming to pluck flowers) is a 1999 Indian Tamil-language drama film directed by A. Venkatesh. The film stars Sivaji Ganesan, Ajay and Malavika, whilst Raghuvaran and M. N. Nambiar play supporting roles. This was Ganesan's last release. The film opened in September 1999 to negative reviews and did poorly at the box office. Despite failure at the box office, it got remade in Telugu as Pelli Sambandham (2000).

== Plot ==
Aravind and Priya are cross-cousins and they fall in love. Their grandfathers Narayanan and Annan (Narayanan's elder brother played by Sivaji) are also keen about getting them married. However, Aravind is a good-for-nothing in the eyes of Ambika, Priya's mother who is married to Narayanan's son Malaysia Vasudevan. To make this marriage happen, Annan and Narayanan start to play a game where they both act as if they are on the opposite side when it comes to marriage with one of them opposing it while the other supports it, while showing that Aravind is a good and capable person to Ambika in the process. Do they succeed? nah

== Cast ==
As per the opening credits:

- Sivaji Ganesan as the author of Pooparika Varugirom
- Ajay as Aravind
- Malavika as Priya
- Raghuvaran as Ranganathan
- M. N. Nambiar as Narayanan
- Chinni Jayanth as Dhandapani
- Kavitha as Aravind's mother
- Keerthana as Ramya

Uncredited

- Malaysia Vasudevan
- Ambika as Priya's mother
- Sanjeev as Vasanth

== Soundtrack ==
The music was composed by Vidyasagar. The lyrics were written by Vaasan.

Track listing
No.	Title	Singer(s)	Length
1.	"Ailey Ailey"	Vidyasagar, Sujatha
2.	"Ananjalum"	Vidyasagar
3.	"Ettil Azhagu"	Srinivas
4.	"Kannum Kannum"	Sujatha, Srinivas
5.	"Kukkoo"	Gopal Rao, Malaysia Vasudevan
6.	"Thikki Thavikkiren"	Murali, Harini

== Reception ==
A critic from Sify wrote that "Ajay does his fights, songs, and romancing well. Without Sivaji in the background he could have been more in the limelight but Sivaji is the type of person who will overshadow without any effort. Needless to say its a Sivaji film. Malavika will be remembered for some fine piece of acting but her song sequence on the beach will not get rid of her glamour puss image". D. S. Ramanujam from The Hindu wrote that "A PLEASANT family drama Aishwarya Films' Pooparikka Varukirom has a new hero in Ajay who matches strides with other seniors in the cast like `Sivaji' Ganesan, M. N. Nambiar and Malaysia Vasudevan".
