= Nethraa =

2019 Indian film by A. Venkatesh

- Poster
- Directed by: A. Venkatesh
- Written by: A. Venkatesh, Ajayan Bala (dialogues)
- Produced by: S. Pararajasingam, A. Venkatesh
- Starring: Vinay; Thaman Kumar; Subiksha; Riythvika
- Cinematography: A. Jeyaprakash
- Edited by: N. Vinaj
- Music by: Srikanth Deva
- Production companies: Swetha Cine Arts; Vengatesh Pictures
- Release date: 9 February 2019
- Running time: 108 minutes
- Country: India
- Language: Tamil

Nethraa (/neɪθrɑː/) is a 2019 Indian Tamil-language thriller film co-produced and directed by A. Venkatesh. The film features Vinay, Thaman Kumar, Subiksha and Riythvika in the lead roles. The music was composed by Srikanth Deva with cinematography by A. Jeyaprakash and editing by N. Vinaj. The film, predominantly shot in Canada, began production in August 2016 and was released on 9 February 2019. The film received highly negative reviews.

== Cast ==
- Vinay Rai as Vikram
- Thaman Kumar as Velu
- Subiksha as Nethraa
- Riythvika as Jessie
- Robo Shankar as Nethraa's uncle
- Motta Rajendran as Rajendran
- Imman Annachi as Kasi
- Vincent Asokan as Ravi
- A. Venkatesh as Officer
- G. K. Reddy as Nethraa's godfather
- Scissor Manohar
- Ambani Shankar
- Citizen Mani
- A. Jeyaprakash
- Vijay Ganesh

== Production ==
The film materialised during August 2016, with Vinay announcing that he would work with on a film with A. Venkatesh and subsequently the shoot began during August 2016. Venkatesh then selected Subiksha to play the leading female role, that of the titular character who travels from Karaikudi to Canada. Venkatesh picked the actress after being impressed with her performance in Vijay Milton's Kadugu (2016), which the pair worked on. Thaman Kumar was also selected to portray a role in the film, while a comedy track with Rajendran and Robo Shankar was filmed during September 2016. Further portions of the film were shot in Karaikudi and in Germany. Many critical and mind blowing visuals of the film was done by cinematographer A. Jeyaprakash. Shoot was completed by early 2017.

== Soundtrack ==
The soundtrack was composed by Srikanth Deva in his fifth collaboration with Venkatesh.

- "Kaikorkarva" - Namitha Babu - Tamil Sree
- "Sollamale" - Namitha Babu, Srikanth Deva - Tamil Sree
- "Asku Busku" - Deva, Lakshmi - Sathuperi Sumathi
- "Annachi" - Guru Ayyadurai, Raja, Jayashri - Kalaikumar

== Reception ==
Cinema Express wrote "Witnessing A Venkatesh, a filmmaker who has been in the industry for three decades, make such a film is, to put it lightly, disheartening". The Times of India wrote "the film-making lets you down, with crude staging, amateurish performances, haphazard editing and over loud score".
