= Sethu Boomi =

2016 Indian film by Kenthiran Muniasami

- Directed by: Kenthiran Muniasami
- Produced by: M. A. Habeeb
- Starring: Thaman Kumar; Samskruthy Shenoy
- Cinematography: S. Muraali; S. Muthuramalingam
- Edited by: Vijay Velkutty
- Music by: V. T. Bharathi; V. T. Monish
- Production company: Royal Moon Entertainment
- Release date: 5 February 2016
- Country: India
- Language: Tamil

Sethu Boomi is a 2016 Indian Tamil drama film, written and directed by Kenthiran Muniasami, who also acts in this film. The film features Thaman Kumar and Samskruthy Shenoy in the lead roles, and Junior Balaiah and Singampuli in supporting roles.

== Cast ==
- Thaman Kumar as Kumaran
- Samskruthy Shenoy as Malar
- Kenthiran Muniasami as Sami
- Cheranraj as Raasu
- Junior Balaiah
- Singampuli
- Rajalingam
- K. S. G. Venkatesh

== Production ==
Following an average response to his first film, Ayyan (2011), Kenthiran Muniasami began working on Sethu Boomi in late 2014 and selected actors Thaman Kumar and Samskruthy Shenoy to play pivotal roles. The film was predominantly shot around Ramanathapuram and Sivagangai during early 2015. By June 2015, the team had completed the film's shoot and had begun post-production works.

== Soundtrack ==
Music composed by V. T. Bharathi and V. T. Monish.

- "Yendi Sandali" - Ranjith
- "Singapore Scent" - M. L. R. Karthikeyan
- "Ini Neeyachu Naanachu" - Rahul Nambiar, Surmukhi
- "En Thayapola" - Kamalaja, Jagadish

== Release ==
The New Indian Express gave the film a mixed review and stated " it is appreciable that the director has capsuled his whole story-telling to less than two hours of viewing time", while adding "with no big names to boast of in its cast or technical crew, the film had raised no expectation, so it is no disappointment either".Samayam critic gave 2.5 out of 5 rating.
