= Arthanari =

2016 Indian film by Sundarra Elangovan

- Directed by: Sundarra Elangovan
- Screenplay by: Sundarra Elangovan
- Story by: A. S. Muthamizh
- Produced by: A. S. Muthamizh
- Starring: Arundhati; Ramkumar
- Cinematography: Sri Ranjanrao
- Edited by: Suresh Urs
- Music by: V. Selvaganesh
- Production company: kiruthika film creation
- Distributed by: 138 minutes
- Release date: 8 July 2016
- Country: India
- Language: Tamil

Arthanari is a 2016 Indian Tamil-language action thriller film starring Arundhati and debutant Ramkumar. The film is directed by Sundarra Elangovan. The film was dubbed in Malayalam with the same name and in Hindi as Mumbai Ki Kiran Bedi.

== Plot ==
Selvamanickam runs an ashram in Chennai, where Karthik grows up. Sathyapriya, a police officer, gets into a fight with Karthik but later consoles him after learning about his past. They eventually fall in love. One day, Selvamanickam dies. Karthik assumes it was a natural death until Sathyapriya reveals he was murdered. Karthik and Sathyapriya seek revenge for Selvamanickam's death.

== Cast ==
- Arundhati as Sathyapriya
- Ramkumar as Karthik
- Nassar as Selvamanickam
- Rajendran
- Abhishek Vinod as Kidnapper
- K. Sivasankar as Ramasamy
- Vazhukku En Muthuraman
- Sampath Ram
- Mippu as Karthik's friend
- Sudhakar
- Thavasi

== Production ==
The film is directed by Sundarra Elangovan, a former assistant of Bala. Arundhati plays an encounter specialist named Sathyapriya while debutant Ramkumar plays a civil engineer who gets involved in Sathyapriya's case. To prepare for her role, Arundhati watched films from the same genre including Blue Steel, The Bone Collector and Mardaani. The film was titled as Arthanari because both the male and female characters have equal importance. Nassar plays a supporting role while Rajendran plays the antagonist.

== Soundtrack ==
The songs are composed by V. Selvaganesh.

No.	Title	Lyrics	Singer(s)	Length
1.	"En Usire"	Kabilan Vairamuthu	Prasanna	4:25
2.	"Kai Veesi Nadakkum"	Kabilan Vairamuthu	Karthik, M. M. Manasi	3:58
3.	"Theenda Theenda"	Kabilan Vairamuthu	M. M. Monisha	4:55
4.	"Mandira Vizhiyal"	Kabilan Vairamuthu	M. M. Manasi	3:58
5.	"En Ennai Nee"	Pa. Meenkashi Sundaram	M. M. Monisha	4:46
Total length:				22:20

== Release ==
=== Critical reception ===
A critic from The Times of India gave the film one and a half out of five stars and wrote that "There are films that have a scrappy feel about them because of their low budget, but this one doesn’t really feel entirely shoddy". Malini Mannath of The New Indian Express wrote that "A stepping stone for a debutant maker, the film could have been an exciting action-flick, if only there had been more clarity and focus in the screenplay and polish in its narrative style". A critic from Samayam gave the film a rating of two out of five stars and praised the directors and Arundhati's performance.
