= Thoranai =

2009 film by Sabha Ayyappan

- Theatrical release poster of Tamil version
- Directed by: Sabha Ayyappan
- Written by: Sabha Ayyappan; Shashank Vennelakanti (Telugu dialogues)
- Produced by: Vikram Krishna
- Starring: Vishal; Shriya Saran; Prakash Raj
- Cinematography: Priyan
- Edited by: V. T. Vijayan
- Music by: Mani Sharma
- Production company: G K Film Corporation
- Release date: 29 May 2009
- Running time: 148 minutes
- Country: India
- Languages: Tamil; Telugu

Thoranai (transl. Posture) or Pistha (transl. Person with attitude) is a 2009 Indian masala film directed by Sabha Ayyappan and produced by Vikram Krishna under the banner G K Film Corporation. It stars Vishal and Shriya Saran in the lead roles, while Prakash Raj, Kishore and Santhanam appear in other pivotal roles. The film was simultaneously shot in Tamil and Telugu languages with different supporting cast in the Telugu version. Thoranai and Pistha were released on 29 May 2009.

== Plot ==
Murugan is a native of Madurai who arrives at Chennai to find his long-lost brother Ganesan, who had run away from home about two decades ago. Murugan gets stuck in a rivalry between gangsters Guru and Tamizharasu, where he learns that Guru is actually Ganesan. Murugan decides to protect Guru/Ganesan from Tamizharasu and a cat-and-mouse game ensues. Guru/Ganesan finally decide to reform himself where he reunites with Murugan and his mother, while Tamizharasu is killed in a police encounter.

== Cast ==
Actor (Tamil)	Actor (Telugu)	Role (Tamil)	Role (Telugu)
Vishal		C. Murugan (CM)	C. Muralikrishna "Krishna" (CM)
Shriya Saran		Indu	Indu
Prakash Raj		Thamizharasu	Suryaprakash
Santhanam	Ali	Vellaichamy	Chittibabu
Kishore		Ganesan (Guru)	Rambabu (Guru)
Sriman		Ganesan	Rambabu
Aarthi		Indu's friend	Indu's friend
Geetha		Murugan's mother	Muralikrishna's mother
Sayaji Shinde		Minister Sivanaandi	Minister Sivanaandi
M. S. Bhaskar	Tanikella Bharani	Tamizharasan's assistant	Suryaprakash's assistant
Paravai Muniyamma	Telangana Shakuntala	Pachamma Patti	Pachamma Patti
Livingston	Surya	Murugan's father	Krishna's father
Pandiarajan	Krishna Bhagavaan	Walter Vetrivel	Walter Rangaraju
Lal		Chennai Police Commissioner	Vizag Police Commissioner
Suruli Manohar	Srinivasa Reddy	Constable	Constable
Mayilsamy	M. S. Narayana	Watchman	Watchman
T. P. Gajendran	Kondavalasa	Apartment Secretary	Apartment Secretary
Suman Shetty		Murugan's friend	Krishna's friend
Nellai Siva		Resident	Resident
Shanmugarajan		Corrupt inspector	Corrupt inspector
Muthukaalai	Kallu Chidambaram	Bike customer	Bike customer
Besant Ravi		Guru's henchman	Guru's henchman
Sampath Ram		Guru's henchman	Guru's henchman
Aryan		Tamizharasan/Suryaprakash's henchman	Tamizharasan/Suryaprakash's henchman
Periya Karuppu Thevar	Rallapalli	Panchayat Man	Panchayat Man
Swaminathan		Cashier	Cashier
Senthi Kumari		Indu's friend	Indu's friend
Manobala	Dharmavarapu Subrahmanyam	Birth and Death administration officer	Birth and Death administration officer
Boys Rajan		Police officer	Police officer
Dhadi Balaji	Chitram Srinu	Bystander who pretends to be blind	Bystander who pretends to be blind
Kullamani		Cyclist who laughs at Indu	Cyclist who laughs at Indu
Karate Raja		Rowdy	Rowdy
Kadhal Saravanan		Waiter	Waiter
Scissor Manohar	Duvvasi Mohan	Man who asks for lift	Man who asks for lift
Raviraj			
Unknown	Annapoornamma	Krishna's grandmother	Krishna's grandmother
Unknown	Gautam Raju	Traffic police officer	Traffic police officer
Meenakshi		Item number in "Vedi Vedi" and "Pidi Pidi"	Item number in "Vedi Vedi" and "Pidi Pidi"

== Production ==
Among the forty scripts that he heard, Vishal okayed Sabha Ayyappan as the director. Ayyappan had previously worked as an assistant director to Boopathy Pandian for Malaikottai (2007).

== Music ==
The music was composed by Mani Sharma. In a music review, Karthik of Milliblog wrote, "Thoranai has what a Vishal starrer deserves â€“ massy and straight forward songs that aim at your feet with Manisharma scoring better than his other recent Tamil soundtracks".

Tamil version

Song	Singers	Lyrics	Length
"Vedi Vedi Saravedi"	Naveen, Ranjith	Viveka	4:26
"Vaa Chellam"	Udit Narayan	Pa. Vijay	5:07
"Pattucha"	Vijay Yesudas, Janani Madhan	Kabilan	3:58
"Peliccan Paravaigal"	Ranjith, Rita, Rahul, Jai	Vaali	4:07
"Manjasela Mandakini"	Tippu, Saindhavi	Pa. Vijay	4:20
"Vaa Chellam" (Version 2)	Ranjith	Pa. Vijay	5:07

Telugu version

- "Pidi Pidi" - Ranjith, Naveen
- "Naa Maharani" - Udit Narayan
- "Pattuko Pattuko" - Narayanan, Janani Madhan
- "Oka Pelican" - Rahul, Suchithra
- "Naa Maharani" - Ranjith
- "Mandakini" - Tippu, Saindhavi

== Critical reception ==
Sify wrote "Arbitrarily packing in elements of every genre without actually bothering to stop and see if the mix does work, Thoranai is like an overcooked stew." Pavithra Srinivasan of Rediff wrote "Thoranai's only merit is that it's marginally better than Sathyam. The Times of India gave 2/5 stars and wrote "It is a formidable star cast that you see in Thoranai. However, what is missing is a convincing story". Reviewing the Telugu version, BVS Prakash of The Times of India gave 1.5/5 stars and wrote "In spite of a dud like Salute, Tamil star Vishal hasn't realised the significance of a solid plot even for a star-centric film."
