= Andhaa Kaanoon =

- Promotional poster
- Directed by: T. Rama Rao
- Story by: Shoba Chandrasekhar; Rahi Masoom Reza (dialogues)
- Based on: Sattam Oru Iruttarai (Tamil) by S. A. Chandrasekhar
- Produced by: A. Poornachandra Rao
- Starring: Amitabh Bachchan; Rajinikanth; Hema Malini; Reena Roy; Madhavi; Danny Denzongpa; Prem Chopra; Pran; Madan Puri; Amrish Puri
- Cinematography: DD Prasad
- Edited by: J. Krishnaswamy; TV Balasubramaniam
- Music by: Laxmikant–Pyarelal
- Production company: Lakshmi Productions
- Release date: 8 April 1983
- Running time: 161 minutes
- Country: India
- Language: Hindi
- Box office: ₹6.4 crore (India Net Collection)

Andhaa Kaanoon (transl. Blind Law) is a 1983 Hindi-language action film directed by T. Rama Rao. It stars Amitabh Bachchan, Rajinikanth, Hema Malini and Reena Roy in leading roles and Dharmendra in a special appearance and featuring an ensemble cast in supporting roles including Danny Denzongpa, Prem Chopra, Pran, Madan Puri and Amrish Puri. Madhavi. It is a remake of the Tamil film Sattam Oru Iruttarai (1981). The film was a critical and commercial success and the 5th highest-grossing film of 1983. This is the Bollywood debut of Tamil superstar Rajinikanth.

== Plot ==
Vijay Singh is hell bent on taking vengeance against three men who had traumatized and killed some of his family members. Vijay's sister, Durga Devi Singh, has joined the Police department just to take revenge against those three men through lawful means. Vijay has decided to kill them one by one by taking law into his own hands as he does not believe in the law.

One day, Vijay comes across an angry and embittered Jaan Nisar Khan who has just been released from prison. Khan used to work as a Forest Officer, and lived with his wife Zakhiya and daughter Neelu. One day while on duty he had come across some poachers who were cutting sandal wood trees illegally. When challenged, they had retaliated. A struggle ensued and one of them, Ram Gupta, was killed. Khan was charged with murder, tried in court, and sentenced to 20 years in prison. His shocked and devastated wife, was raped and she had killed herself and their daughter.

Khan now decides to help Vijay. Further, Khan finds out that Gupta is still alive. How the three protagonists, Khan, Durga and Vijay, succeed in avenging the enemies forms the rest of the story.

== Cast ==
- Amitabh Bachchan as Jaan Nisar Khan
- Rajinikanth as Vijay Kumar Singh, Durga's brother
  - Harish Kumar as Young Vijay
- Hema Malini as Inspector Durga Devi Singh
- Reena Roy as Meena Shrivatsav
- Madhavi as Zakhiya Khan, Jaan Nisar's wife (Extended Special appearance)
- Danny Denzongpa as Akbar Ali
- Prem Chopra as Amarnath
- Pran as Anthony D'Cruz
- Madan Puri as Jailor Gupta
- Amrish Puri as Ram Gupta
- Chandrashekhar Dubey as Mamaji
- Om Shivpuri as Police Commissioner K. B. Lal
- Sulochana Latkar as Durga and Vijay's mother
- Gautami as Durga and Vijay's elder sister (victim)
- Urmila Bhatt as Meena's mother
- Asrani as Constable Asrani
- Agha as Police Constable
- Dharmendra as Truck Driver (Cameo)
- Satyen Kappu as Kapil Kumar Singh: Durga and Vijay's father (Dead)

== Soundtrack ==
All lyrics written by Anand Bakshi and music by Laxmikant-Pyarelal.

Song	Singer
"Andhaa Kaanoon"	Kishore Kumar
"Meri Bahena"	Kishore Kumar, Asha Bhosle
"Rote Rote" (Happy)	Kishore Kumar
"Rote Rote" (Sad)	Kishore Kumar, Rajeshwari Sachdev
"Ek Taraf Hum Tum, Ek Taraf Sare"	S. P. Balasubrahmanyam, Asha Bhosle
"Mausam Ka Taqaaza Hai"	S. P. Balasubrahmanyam, Asha Bhosle
"Kabhi Na Kabhi"	Asha Bhosle

== Reception ==
S Venkat Narayan of India Today wrote "Andhaa Kaanoon (Blind Law) is what they call a masala film. It has violence, injustice, sex, revenge, thrills, good photography, slick direction. The potion is, like the witches' brew, deadly. The story is too complicated to bother about. Suffice it to say that it's all about the law being an ass."

== Bibliography ==
- Ramachandran, Naman (2014) [2012]. Rajinikanth: The Definitive Biography. New Delhi: Penguin Books. ISBN 978-0-14-342111-5.
