= Vedappan =

- Directed by: Aanaivari A. Sridhar
- Written by: Aanaivari A. Sridhar
- Produced by: P. Radhakrishnan
- Starring: Hemanth Kumar; Apsara; Nikitha
- Cinematography: D. Maghibalan
- Edited by: S. Satish
- Music by: Nesan
- Production company: PRK Movies
- Release date: 9 October 2009
- Running time: 125 minutes
- Country: India
- Language: Tamil

Vedappan is a 2009 Tamil language drama film directed by Aanaivari A. Sridhar. The film stars Hemanth Kumar, newcomer Apsara and newcomer Nikitha, with Vennira Aadai Moorthy, Balu Anand, Mahanadi Shankar, Crane Manohar and Sabitha Anand playing supporting roles. It was released on 9 October 2009.

== Plot ==
In a village, Vedappan works in a tea stall owned by Panneer and he is also a hardcore fan of cinema actress Deepika. He wants to meet Deepika by any means and an aspiring director promises him to make him a hero. In the meantime, the flower seller Kanaka falls in love with Vedappan. Vedappan then gets a small role in Deepika's film. During the shooting, instead of shooting towards Deepika with a replica gun, Vedappan shoots her with a real gun and Deepika is wounded on the shoulder. Vedappan then escapes from the shooting spot and Deepika is admitted to the hospital. Thereafter, the police arrest Vedappan and he is forced to tell them the reason for shooting her.

In the past, Vedappan and his widow father were poor workers who repaired metal vessels while Deepika was a poor karakattam dancer who lived with her widow mother. Despite being a street dancer, Deepika wanted to be treated with dignity and Vedappan was deeply in love with her. Deepika and her mother then left the village without notice. Afterwards, Vedappan learns that she had become a cinema actress in Chennai. One day, Vedappan saw Deepika's sex tape video and he was flabbergasted by it, so he decided to kill her.

The police tell him that the video was morphed and the girl in the video was not Deepika thus Vedappan realises his mistake and he is released. The film ends with Vedappan accepting Kanaka's love.

== Cast ==
- Hemanth Kumar as Vedappan
- Apsara as Deepika
- Nikitha as Kanaka
- Vennira Aadai Moorthy as Panneer
- Balu Anand as Vedappan's father
- Mahanadi Shankar
- Crane Manohar as an aspiring director
- Sabitha Anand as Deepika's mother
- Muthukaalai
- Nellai Siva as Annachi
- Halwa Vasu
- Sampath
- Raja Rishi as Thulasi
- Yahesh
- C. S. Sukumar
- Antony Cruz
- Antony Raj
- Aanaivari A. Sridhar in a cameo appearance

== Production ==
Aanaivari A. Sridhar made his directorial debut with Vedappan under PRK Movies banner. Hemanth Kumar, who acted in Vasool (2008), was chosen to play the male lead while newcomer Arundhati (credited as Apsara) from Bangalore and newcomer Nikitha were selected to play heroines. Mahanadi Shankar, Vennira Aadai Moorthy and Balu Anand roped to play significant roles. Nesan composed the music, D. Maghibalan took care of camera work and the editing was by S. Satish. The film was shot in 30 days.

== Soundtrack ==
Vedappan

Soundtrack album by Nesan
- Released: 2009
- Recorded: 2009
- Genre: Feature film soundtrack
- Length: 25:10
- Producer: Nesan

The film score and the soundtrack were composed by Nesan. The soundtrack features 5 tracks with lyrics written by Ilaya Kamban, Annamalai, Sundran, Antony Cruz and Jayakondan. The audio was released on 29 June 2009 in Chennai. Actor Prashanth, Sivasakthi Pandian, V. C. Guhanathan and Suresh Joachim attended the audio launch.

Tracklist
No.	Title	Writer(s)	Singer(s)	Length
1.	"Vandhuputtom Salangai Katti"	Antony Cruz	Periya Karuppu Thevar	03:57
2.	"Alaigiya Alaigiya Devadai Penne"	Ilaya Kamban	Bellie Raj, Anuradha Sriram	04:55
3.	"Mallivechan Mallivechan"	Jayakondan	Bellie Raj, Neepa	04:17
4.	"Vazhkai Romba Avasaram"	Sundran	Malathy Lakshman	04:45
5.	"Nathiyin Payanam Kadalai Thedum"	Annamalai	Karthik	07:16
Total length:				25:10
