= Agraja =

- Poster
- Directed by: Srinandan
- Written by: Srinandan; Santhosh Ananddram; Manju Prabhas
- Produced by: Govardhan
- Starring: Jaggesh; Darshan; Kamna Jethmalani; Sanjjana; Arundathi; Aadya Gowda
- Cinematography: Ramesh Babu
- Edited by: T. Govardhan
- Music by: Nandhan Raj
- Release date: 18 April 2014
- Running time: 141 minutes
- Country: India
- Language: Kannada
- Budget: ₹8 crore (US$950,000)
- Box office: ₹6.3 crore (US$750,000) (first 4 days)

Agraja is a 2014 Indian Kannada-language film directed by Srinandan starring Jaggesh with Darshan in an extended guest appearance. Kamna Jethmalani, Sanjjana, Arundathi and Aadya Gowda (earlier named Poornima) played the heroines, while Sadashiva Brahmavar, Rangayana Raghu, Biradar and Achyuth Kumar played supporting roles. The film was produced by editor T. Govardhan under his newly established banner named, The Great Indian Movie Creators. Agraja is based on the subject of a National Film Award winning Telugu film, which was revealed to be R. P. Patnaik's Broker.

== Plot ==
An enthralling tale on corruption and black money, the plot weaves around its two major characters, Charandas, IAS (Darshan) and Siddha (Jaggesh) and depicts their journey through the path of conflict and realization. Portray as corrupt in the beginning of the film, both Charandas, IAS and Siddha start realizing the flaw in themselves and its impact on the society at large. Thus, begins the battle of two individuals against corruption and black money with a pledge to free the society from these major evils.

== Cast ==
- Jaggesh as Sidda
- Darshan as Charandas IAS
- Kamna Jethmalani
- Sanjjana as herself
- Arundathi as Charandas's wife
- Mansi Pritam (special appearance in the song "Mysore Wadeyaravaru")
- Aadya Gowda as Sidda's wife
- Sadashiva Brahmavar
- Kuri Prathap
- Doddanna
- Sadhu Kokila
- Om Prakash Rao
- Suchendra Prasad as News Anchor
- Sam Styris

== Soundtrack ==
The music was composed Nandan Raj and released by D-Beats. All Lyrics were written by Panchajanya.

Agraja

Soundtrack album by Nandan Raj
- Released: August 15, 2013
- Recorded: 2013
- Genre: Soundtrack
- Length: 25:11
- Label: D-Beats
- Producer: Nandan Raj

Track list
No.	Title	Singer(s)	Length
1.	"Big Boss"	Shankar Mahadevan	4:19
2.	"Rara Priyachora"	Sunitha	3:51
3.	"Mysore Wadeyaravaru"	Bhargavi Pillai, R.P. Shravan	3:59
4.	"Vandematharam"	S. P. Balasubrahmanyam	4:55
5.	"Minchondu Thakida"	Hemanth, Thejasvi	4:08
6.	"Big Boss (Version 2)"	Shankar Mahadevan	3:59
Total length:			25:11

== Critical reception ==
The Times of India gave the film 3 stars out of 5 and wrote, "Though the script is crisp, too many cooks spoil the broth. Excessive twists and turns and multiple characters take away from the script. The first half leaver the viewer confused but sequences in the latter half add value to the story". Bangalore Mirror gave it a score of 2.5 and wrote, "The film's plot is no doubt appealing. However, the screenplay is gripping only in the last 30 minutes or so. The rest of the film is rather slow and a dose of adrenaline could have helped".
