= Tiragabadara Saami =

Indian action drama film

- Theatrical release poster
- Directed by: A. S. Ravi Kumar Chowdary
- Written by: A. S. Ravi Kumar Chowdary
- Produced by: Malkapuram Shivakumar
- Starring: Raj Tarun; Malvi Malhotra
- Cinematography: Jawahar Reddy MN
- Music by: Jeevan Babu (JB)
- Production company: Suraksh Entertainments Media
- Release date: 2 August 2024
- Country: India
- Language: Telugu

Tiragabadara Saami is a 2024 Indian Telugu-language action drama film written and directed by A. S. Ravi Kumar Chowdary. The film stars Raj Tarun and Malvi Malhotra in lead roles. The film was released on 2 August 2024.

== Plot ==
A young couple's altercation with a mafia henchman draws the ire of a powerful crime boss, plunging them into a dangerous game of survival.

== Cast ==
- Raj Tarun as Giri
- Malvi Malhotra as Sailaja
- Mannara Chopra as Radha
- Makarand Deshpande as Konda Reddy
- Pragathi
- Bithiri Sathi
- Raghu Babu
- John Vijay
- Prudhvi Raj
- Raja Ravindra
- Thagubothu Ramesh
- Bhadram

== Music ==
All music is composed by Jeevan Babu.

Track list
No.	Title	Lyrics	Singer(s)	Length
1.	"Oka Poola Meghamey"	Sri Mani	Hymath Mohammed	2:30
2.	"Chaala Bagunde"	Sri Mani	Chaitu Satsangi, Lipsika Bhashyam	3:56
3.	"Radhabhai"	Bhole Shavali	Sravana Bhargavi	3:11
4.	"Celebration Song"	Suddala Ashok Teja	Lipsika Bhashyam, Aditi Bhavaraju, Chaitu Satsangi	3:21
5.	"Title Song"	Suddala Ashok Teja	Sai Charan, Lokeshwar Edara, Chaitu Satsangi	2:58

== Reception ==
NTV gave a rating of 1.5 out of 5 citing it as "silly and dumb". Eenadu opined that the film's story and screenplay are outdated.
