= Love Marriage (2001 film) =

2001 film by K. Subash

- Title card
- Directed by: K. Subash
- Story by: Trivikram Srinivas
- Based on: Swayamvaram (Telugu)
- Produced by: Ajay
- Starring: Ajay; Ranjana
- Cinematography: Ilavarasu
- Edited by: Krishnamoorthy
- Music by: Deva
- Production company: G. K. Entertainment
- Release date: 14 December 2001
- Country: India
- Language: Tamil

Love Marriage is a 2001 Indian Tamil-language film directed by K. Subash. A remake of the Telugu film Swayamvaram, it was produced by Vikram Krishna then known as Ajay, who also appeared in the lead role alongside Ranjana. The film was released on 14 December 2001.

== Cast ==
- Ajay as Shreekanth
- Ranjana as Shobha
- Vijayakumar as Shreekanth's father
- Vadivelu as Chitti Babu
- Anu Mohan
- Pandu
- Mohan Raman
- R. S. Sivaji
- Shyam Ganesh as Vimal
- Chaplin Balu as Shreekanth's friend
- Kumaresan as Shreekanth's friend
- Kovai Senthil
- Fathima Babu as Shreekanth's mother

== Production ==
The film was partially shot in Switzerland, with the BBC reporting on the film's schedule in Bern. Another scene was shot at Ooty.

== Soundtrack ==
Soundtrack was composed by Deva.

| Song | Singers | Lyrics | Length |
|---|---|---|---|
| "Apple Ondru" | Tippu | Palani Bharathi | 05:57 |
| Kannaale Kollaathe" | Naveen Madhav, Anuradha Sriram | Na. Muthukumar | 06:28 |
| "Keeravani" | Krishnaraj, Swarnalatha | Na. Muthukumar | 05:30 |
| "Roja Malare" | Karthik, Sujatha | Thamarai | 06:13 |
| "Sa Sa Saroja" | Mano, Krishnaraj | Gangai Amaran | 05:18 |

== Reception ==
Malini Mannath of Chennai Online felt "There is not much excitement here, neither in the scenes nor in the starcast." Malathi Rangarajan of The Hindu wrote, "Love Marriage is neither a boring love triangle nor a melodrama of friendship and sacrifice. And the film rises above any predictable formula – but only to be caught in a web of a very loosely hanging storyline."
