= Bodinayakkanur Ganesan =

2011 film directed by O. Gnanam

- Theatrical release pposter
- Directed by: O. Gnanam
- Written by: O. Gnanam
- Produced by: Athiralakshmi; Atul Krishna
- Starring: Harikumar; Arundhati
- Cinematography: Prabhakar
- Edited by: S. P. Ahamed
- Music by: John Peter
- Production company: Lakshmi Krishna Combines
- Release date: 29 July 2011
- Running time: 135 minutes
- Country: India
- Language: Tamil

Bodinayakkanur Ganesan (transl. Ganesan from Bodinayakkanur) is a 2011 Indian Tamil-language action film directed by O. Gnanam. The film stars Harikumar and Arundhati, with Ravi Shankar, Soori, L. Raja, Christopher, Dindigul Alex, Stills Kumar, M. Thirupathi and V. Venkatesh playing supporting roles. The film, produced by Athiralakshmi and Atul Krishna, had musical score by John Peter and was released on 29 July 2011.

== Plot ==
Ganesan (Harikumar) and his friend Gilaki (Soori) sell arrack and ganja in Bodinayakkanur and they work for the heartless ruffian Thiruvaachi (Ravi Shankar). Ganesan and Gilaki often go to jail for petty crimes and Ganesan has a mentally-challenged brother Kottaiyan who lives in a special home. One day, Ganesan comes across the nurse Raji (Arundhathi) who cares and shares for others and he falls in love with her. When Ganesan reveals his love, Raji insults him for being a rowdy and advises him to become a good man. Her words shook him so much, that Ganesan all of a sudden has an epileptic seizure in front of her and no one came to help him. Ganesan then decides to earn an honest living but Thiruvaachi who has a grudge against Ganesan tries to stop him. Meanwhile, Thiruvaachi wants to marry his cousin Raji and confronts Ganesan.

In the past, Thiruvaachi was the son of the wealthy man Azhagar (L. Raja) while Ganesan was the son of their servant Manikkam (V. Venkatesh). Being constantly and unfavourably compared with Ganesan who was academically inclined, Thiruvachi had developed a hatred for Ganesan and he had slowly become a wastrel. One day, Thiruvaachi stabbed to death his own father Azhagar in front of Ganesan and a shocked Ganesan had his first epileptic seizure but before dying, Azhagar requested Ganesan to endure Thiruvachi's evil deeds for the good of Kottaiyan. Thiruvaachi left the place and blamed Ganesan for killing his father. The innocent Ganesan spent time in jail and he then became Thiruvaachi's henchman.

Back to the present, Ganesan fights back and defeats Thiruvaachi. Raji eventually accepts to marry a reformed Ganesan and they get engaged with the blessings of Raji's mother, Gilaki, Gilaki's newly married wife Annakili (Janaki) and the villagers. Thiruvaachi then abducts Annakili and he threatens to rape her unless Gilaki gives Kottaiyan up. Gilaki surprisingly makes the exchange and he then feels guilty of betraying his best friend. The next day, Gilaki is found hanging from a tree and Annakili reveals everything to Ganesan. Ganesan sets out to find his brother but Thiruvaachi mercilessly kills Kottaiyan. Ganesan and Raji track Thiruvaachi down and they find the dead body of Kottaiyan. Ganesan begins to have an epileptic seizure but he manages to control it and Thiruvaachi attacks the couple. The film ends with Ganesan killing Thiruvaachi.

== Cast ==
- Harikumar as Ganesan
- Arundhati as Raji
- Ravi Shankar as Thiruvaachi
- Soori as Gilaki
- L. Raja as Azhagar
- Christopher as Head constable
- Dindigul Alex as Inspector Naagu
- Stills Kumar as "Alaparai" Arumugam
- M. Thirupathi as Kottaiyan
- V. Venkatesh as Manikkam
- Jinda as Bose
- Janaki as Annakili
- Madhu in a special appearance

== Production ==
O. Gnanam, who had earlier worked with Surya Prakash and Ravi Mariya, made his directorial debut with Bodinayakkanur Ganesan under the banner of Lakshmi Krishna Combines. After Thoothukudi (2006) and Madurai Sambavam (2009), Harikumar returned to play the lead role. The action sequences were directed by Anal Arasu, while Prabhakar had handled the camera. The film was primarily shot in Bodinayakkanur. With the traditional Fishing Festival as the backdrop, Gnanam convinced fisherfolk to shift the event to a date convenient to shoot, for the film.

== Soundtrack ==
The soundtrack was composed by John Peter.

Track listing
No.	Title	Lyrics	Singer(s)	Length
1.	"Pooti Kedandha Manasu"	Nandalala	Karthik, Priya	4:19
2.	"Vanjira Meen"	Nandalala	Ranjith, Anuradha Sriram	4:42
3.	"Murattu Machan"	Nandalala	S. P. Balasubrahmanyam, K. S. Chithra	5:15
4.	"Kolam Potta"	Nandalala	Haricharan	2:45
5.	"Bodi Ganesan"	Ilaya Kamban	Velmurugan, Chinnaponnu	5:06
Total length:				22:07

== Release and reception ==
Bodinayakkanur Ganesan was released on 29 July 2011. The New Indian Express said, "the plot and narration is quite monotonous and tedious is an understatement" and concluded, "This one too is a passable entertainer, with nothing novel or exciting to offer the audience". Malathi Rangarajan of The Hindu wrote, "The same kind of stuff you've seen ever so many times, with a little suspense here and there". The film failed at the box office.
