= Park (2024 film) =

Indian horror thriller film

- Theatrical release poster
- Directed by: E.K. Murugan
- Produced by: L. N. E. Natraj
- Starring: Thaman Kumar; Swetha Dorathy
- Cinematography: Pandiyan Kuppan
- Edited by: Gurusuriya
- Music by: Hamara CV
- Production company: Akshaya Movie Makers
- Release date: 9 August 2024
- Country: India
- Language: Tamil

Park is a 2024 Indian Tamil-language horror thriller film directed by E. K. Murugan and starring Thaman Kumar and Swetha Dorathy.

== Cast ==
- Thaman Kumar as Mithran
- Swetha Dorathy as Yaazhini
- Black Pandi as Dish
- Yogi Ram
- Karate Raja
- Ranjan Kumar
- Surenthar
- Crane Manohar
- Vijay Ganesh
- Ranjana Nachiyar
- Rekha Suresh
- Jayanthi Mala
- Neema Ray
- Harshitha Kallingal (special appearance in the song "Jigli Bugli")

== Release and reception ==
The film was released on 9 August 2024 alongside seven other films.

A critic from The Times of India rated the film two out of five stars and wrote that "Park fails to leave a lasting impression, fizzling out like a damp firecracker. It’s neither scary nor amusing, just a bewildering mashup of outdated romance tropes and bargain-bin horror elements". A critic from Cinema Express wrote that "The film is ineffective in almost every aspect that the logical loopholes stopped being bothersome after a point". A critic from Maalai Malar wrote that director Murugan has directed the film based on the usual revenge story.
