= Sattam Oru Iruttarai =

1981 film by S. A. Chandrasekhar

- Poster
- Directed by: S. A. Chandrasekhar
- Screenplay by: S. A. Chandrasekhar
- Story by: Shoba
- Produced by: Vadalur S. Chidambaram
- Starring: Vijayakanth; Poornima Devi; Vasumathi
- Cinematography: D. D. Prasad
- Edited by: B. Gowtham Raj
- Music by: Shankar–Ganesh
- Production company: Vadularan Combines
- Release date: 14 February 1981
- Running time: 125 minutes
- Country: India
- Language: Tamil

Sattam Oru Iruttarai (transl. The Law is a Dark Room) is a 1981 Indian Tamil-language vigilante action film written and directed by S. A. Chandrasekhar, from a story by his wife Shoba. The film stars Vijayakanth, Poornima Devi and Vasumathi, with Sangili Murugan, Nithin and Chowdry in supporting roles. It revolves around a man who seeks to kill three men to avenge his father and elder sister, while his other sister, a police inspector, wants to thwart them the legal way.

Sattam Oru Iruttarai is the second film directed by Chandrasekhar. It was released on 14 February 1981, and became a major commercial success, inspiring more Tamil films with themes about the law system which were mostly directed by Chandrasekhar. The film was remade in Telugu as Chattaniki Kallu Levu (1981), in Malayalam as Maattuvin Chattangale (1982), in Kannada as Nyaya Ellide (1982), in Hindi as Andhaa Kaanoon (1983) and again in Tamil under the same title (2012).

== Plot ==
Vijay and his elder sister, police inspector Sheela live with their widowed mother. Vijay fights for justice whenever he comes across injustice in society and gets caught by the police. He is frequently at loggerheads with Sheela due to his aggressive behaviour. Vijay's only mission in life is to kill three men: George, Rangachari and Bhairavan. Vijay's father once witnessed a murder committed by the trio. Despite being arrested, the trio managed to come out of prison, where they killed Vijay's father and also killed his other sister. When Vijay and Sheela approached the police to report the killings, the police brushed them off by stating that the accused were in prison when the murders took place and hence could not have committed them.

The trio's method of committing the murders with an alibi registers in Vijay's mind and he decides to take revenge on them in the same way. Sheela, however, feels they should be punished legally, hence she takes up the case 15 years after the murders. The trio come to known about the case being reopened and try to kill Sheela by planting a bomb in her jeep. Vijay catches Peter, the man who planted the bomb, and saves Sheela. Peter becomes an ally of Vijay in his crusade.

When Rangachari tries to molest Rekha, a bar dancer who knows Vijay, she saves herself. She later tells Vijay that she did so by knocking out Rangachari's glasses, without which he can hardly see, and Vijay recognises him as one of his father's murderers. Rangachari is killed by Vijay taking him in his car, removing his glasses and leaving him on the road, where he is run over. He then makes Bhairavan drunk, and mixes poison in his drink to kill him. George understands that his friends were murdered by Vijay and decides to challenge him. Meanwhile, Rekha and Vijay marry. George reaches the hotel where they are staying and murders Rekha. Infuriated, Vijay tries to kill George, but Sheela, who is aware of Vijay's activities, corners and arrests him.

From prison, Vijay works out a plan with Peter, creates his alibi and goes to meet George. Sheela, who has gone to meet George, is caught and tied by him. Vijay reaches there, fights George and kills him in Sheela's presence. By the time Sheela returns to the police station, Vijay is back in lock-up. Sheela tries to prove that Vijay had committed the murders. But in court, she is unable to prove this as Vijay as built a strong alibi, showing he was in lock-up when the murder took place. Vijay is exonerated due to lack of evidence, but Sheela remains determined to apprehend him in a higher court.

== Cast ==
- Vijayakanth as Vijay
- Poornima Devi as Rekha
- Vasumathi as Sheela
- Sangili Murugan as George
- Nithin as Rangachari
- Chowdry as Bhairavan
- Ganesh as the beggar
- Amjad Kumar as Peter

== Production ==
Sattam Oru Iruttarai is the second film directed by S. A. Chandrasekhar after Aval Oru Pachai Kuzhandhai (1978). The screenplay was written by him from a story by his wife Shoba. The film borrows its title from a dialogue spoken in Velaikari (1949): "Sattam oru iruttarai, adhil vakeelin vadham oru vilakku. aanal adhu ezhaikku ettadha vilakku", which translates to, "[The] law is a dark room where the lawyer's argument is a lamp. But it is inaccessible to the poor". The script was rejected by at least 20 producers, until Vadalur S. Chidambaram of Vadaluran Combines picked it up. Chidambaram chose Vijayakanth for the lead character after he was impressed with his performance in Neerottam (1980). This casting choice attracted stiff opposition from some quarters protesting against giving the hero chance to Vijayakanth in the film. Despite these objections, the producer stood firm in his decision. Cinematography was handled by D. D. Prasad, and editing by B. Gowtham Raj. Vijayakanth's voice was dubbed by S. N. Surendar.

== Soundtrack ==
The music was composed by Shankar–Ganesh.

Track listing
No.	Title	Lyrics	Singer(s)	Length
1.	"Sattam Oru Iruttarai"	Kamakodiyan	Malaysia Vasudevan	3:42
2.	"Rajathi Munnale"	Gnani	S. N. Surendar	4:50
3.	"Thanimayile"	Poonguyilan	S. N. Surendar, S. Janaki	4:42
4.	"Pagalil Oru Thagam"	Gangai Amaran	Shoba Chandrasekhar	4:27
Total length:				17:41

== Release and reception ==
Sattam Oru Iruttarai was released on 14 February 1981. On 1 March 1981, Ananda Vikatan positively reviewed the film, particularly the script. On 15 March, Nalini Sastri of Kalki called it a routine revenge story, but the director's treatment of the subject made it worthwhile. The film was a commercial success, running for over 100 days in theatres.

== Remakes ==
Sattam Oru Iruttarai was remade in Telugu as Chattaniki Kallu Levu (1981), in Malayalam as Maattuvin Chattangale (1982), in Kannada as Nyaya Ellide (1982) in Hindi as Andhaa Kaanoon (1983) and again in Tamil under the same title by Chandrasekhar's granddaughter Sneha Britto (2012).

== Legacy ==
The film's success established Vijayakanth as a star in Tamil cinema. The success also inspired more Tamil films with themes about the law system which were mostly directed by Chandrasekhar and his disciple S. Shankar.

== Bibliography ==
- Arunachalam, Param (2020). BollySwar: 1981–1990. Mavrix Infotech. ISBN 9788193848227.
- Dhananjayan, G. (2011). The Best of Tamil Cinema, 1931 to 2010: 1977–2010. Galatta Media. OCLC 733724281.
