= Vikram Krishna =

Indian film producer and actor

Vikram Krishna Reddy
- Born: Vikram Krishna; 11 October 1973 (age 53); Chennai, Tamil Nadu, India
- Occupations: Actor, Film producer
- Years active: 1993–2011
- Spouse: Sriya Reddy (m. 2008)
- Children: 1
- Family: Vishal (Brother)

Vikram Krishna Reddy, credited in films as Ajay, is a former Indian film producer and actor in Tamil cinema. He is the elder brother of noted actor Vishal and is married to actress Sriya Reddy. He produced films under the banner G.K Film Corporation.

== Early life and career ==
His younger brother Vishal is a popular actor in Tamil film industry.

Vikram prepared to make a debut as an actor in Tamil films as early as January 1996. He made his lead debut with Pooparika Varugirom (1999) co-starring Sivaji Ganesan before starring in Love Marriage (2001), a remake of the Telugu film Swayamvaram. Although critics noted that he was at ease at acting, fighting and dancing, both films were box office failures, failing to propel his career. Ajay turned to producing his brother Vishal's films.

== Personal life ==
He is married to VJ-turned-actress Sriya Reddy. The couple have a daughter.

== Filmography ==
=== As actor ===
Year	Film	Role	Notes
1989	Jadikketha Moodi		Child artist; cameo appearance in the song "Meesavatcha Ambalaikkelam"
1996	Mahaprabhu	Theatre visitor	Cameo appearance
1999	Annan Thangachi	Baskar	
1999	Pooparika Varugirom	Aravind	
2001	Love Marriage	Shreekanth	Also producer

=== As producer ===
Year	Film	Notes
2001	Love Marriage	
2005	Sandakozhi	Dubbed in Telugu as Pandem Kodi
2006	Thimiru	Dubbed in Telugu as Pogaru
2008	Sathyam	Simultaneously shot in Telugu as Salute
2009	Thoranai	Simultaneously shot in Telugu as Pistha
2010	Theeradha Vilaiyattu Pillai	Dubbed in Telugu as Khiladi
2011	Vaadu Veedu	Telugu dubbed version
2011	Vedi	
