= Harshavardhan =

Harshavardhan is an Indian masculine given name. Notable people with the name include:

- Harshavardhana (590–647), emperor of Kannauj from 606 to 647
- Harshavardhan Kulkarni, Indian film director, screenwriter and producer
- Harshavardhan Neotia (born 1961), Indian businessman
- Harshvardhan Patil (born 1963), Indian politician
- Harshavardhan Rameshwar, Indian composer, instrumentalist, music producer and singer
- Beeram Harshavardhan Reddy (born 1978), Indian politician

== See also ==
- Harsha Vardhan, Indian actor and screenwriter
- Harshvardhan Rane (born 1983), Indian actor
