= Oru Nodi =

- Theatrical release poster
- Directed by: B. Manivarman
- Written by: B. Manivarman
- Produced by: G. Azhagar; G. Dhananjayan; K G Ratheesh
- Starring: Thaman Kumar; M. S. Bhaskar; Vela Ramamoorthy
- Cinematography: K G Ratheesh
- Edited by: S. Gurusuriya
- Music by: Sanjay Manickam
- Production companies: Creative Entertainers & Distributors
- Release date: 26 April 2024 (India)
- Country: India
- Language: Tamil

Oru Nodi (transl. One second) is a 2024 Tamil-language crime thriller film written and directed by B. Manivarman, produced by G. Azhagar, G. Dhananjayan, and K G Ratheesh under the banner of Creative Entertainers & Distributors. The film features Thaman Kumar, M. S. Bhaskar, and Vela Ramamoorthy in the lead roles, while Pala. Karuppiah, Gajaraj, Karuppu Nambiyaar, Sriranjani, and Deepa Shankar play supporting roles. A missing man and murder of young woman story

The music was composed by Sanjay Manickam with cinematography by KG Ratheesh and editing by S. Gurusuriya. The film was released on 26 April 2024.

== Plot ==
The movie starts of with a woman going to a police station to complain about her missing husband, Sekhar. When asked by a Constable, she says that she suspects Karimedu Thyagu, a ruthless loan shark to kidnap her husband. When constable refuses to take the case due to Thyagu's influence, a sincere police inspector Paruthi Ilamaran takes up the case. He has a strong feeling that Thyagu had done this due to a feud between Thyagu and Sekhar as the latter did not oblige to give his land documents resulting in Thyagu forcefully grabbing his documents from him. Paruthi was about to arrest Thyagu but was stopped by MLA Thirugnanamoorrhy, Thyagu's friend and a corrupt MLA

Paruthi successfully arrests Thyagu and interrogates him in a room about the kidnapping. But Thyagu does not divulge any information to him. Meanwhile, there is another case of a woman murdered mysteriously in a farm. Paruthi investigates the case and finds out that she's Parvathy, a girl working in a jewellery store. She gets stalked by a man named Natraj into pressurising her to marry him. Paruthi goes to catch Natraj but he hanged himself upon getting shocked by Parvathy's death. Then he interrogates her parents but her father denies any love affair, making Paruthi suspicious.

Paruthi finds out that Parvathy indeed had a boyfriend named Jeeva who Paruthi had met for some important case. When Jeeva gave wrong details to Paruthi, he catches him and beats him in a police station. Then Jeeva realises that her girlfriend got pregnant and that he truly loved her. Then Paruthi interrogates her father but he denied any involvement in her killing, leaving Paruthi perplexed.

Meanwhile, the woman Shakunthala gets anxiously worried about her husband and pressurizes Paruthi to find him. Paruthi still believes that Thyagu did it, but it was later found that Thyagu did not do it. He later realises that Sekhar got slit by an unknown person. That unknown person is revealed to be Vinayagam, a barber who mistakenly killed Sekhar with a shaving knife when he was taking the phone. To avoid himself of getting caught, he kills Sekhar again with an axe. Then he feeds Sekhar's body parts to a dog, Parvathy took a video and was about to give it to the cops, Vinayagam killed her ruthlessly and strangled her.

The Barber eventually admits his mistakes and gets a lifetime imprisonment. The movie ends with Paruthi solving another murder case

== Cast ==
- Thaman Kumar as Paridhi Ilamaran, a police inspector
- M. S. Bhaskar as Sekaran, a photographer
- Vela Ramamoorthy as Karimedu Thyagu, a notorious financier
- Pala. Karuppiah as MLA Thirugnana Moorthy
- Aadukalam Naren as Commissioner Mathimaran
- Vignesh Adithya as Vinayagam
- Gajaraj as Yogalingam
- Karuppu Nambiyaar as SI Manickam
- Swaminathan as Manoharan
- Sriranjani as Sakunthala Sekaran
- Deepa Shankar as Ponnuthayi
- Arun Karthi as Jeeva

== Release ==
Oru Nodi was theatrically released on 26 April 2024.

== Reception ==
Abhinav Subramanian of The Times of India rated the film 3 stars out of 5 stars and noted "A tighter screenplay and a more suspenseful build-up could have elevated the film to a truly gripping experience."

Manigandan KR of Times Now rated the film 3 stars out of 5 stars and noted "Oru Nodi might not be an exceptional thriller but it certainly is a sincere and commendable attempt at narrating a gripping investigative story that keeps you guessing right till the very end."

Akshay Kumar from The New Indian Express rated the film 2 stars out of 5 stars and noted "With all that being said, Oru Nodi has safely distanced itself from indulging too much on the romantic track and also thankfully stays away from a typical ‘Tamil cinema cop song’."
