= Sattam Oru Iruttarai (2012 film) =

- Poster
- Directed by: Sneha Britto
- Written by: S. A. Chandrasekhar
- Based on: Sattam Oru Iruttarai
- Produced by: Vimala Rani
- Starring: Thaman Kumar; Bindu Madhavi; Erode Mahesh; Reemma Sen
- Cinematography: C. J. Rajkumar
- Edited by: M R Rejeesh
- Music by: Vijay Antony
- Production company: Esthell Entertainers
- Release date: 21 December 2012
- Country: India
- Language: Tamil
- Budget: 5 million

Sattam Oru Iruttarai (transl. The Law is a Dark Room) is a 2012 Tamil language film directed by Sneha Britto, which is a remake of the 1981 Vjayakanth film of the same name by S. A. Chandrasekhar. The film stars Thaman Kumar and Bindu Madhavi while Erode Mahesh and Reema Sen amongst others play supporting roles. Pia Bajpai plays a Guest role in the film. The film marks the acting debut of Erode Mahesh as well as the last featured film for actress, Reema Sen prior to her marriage and further retirement to take care and concentrate on her family more.

== Cast ==
- Thaman Kumar as Vijay
- Bindu Madhavi as Diya
- Erode Mahesh as Kumar
- Piaa Bajpai as Jessamine/Jess (Special role)
- Reema Sen as Kausalya Raman
- Suresh
- Radha Ravi
- Sampath Ram as Anand
- Baby Rakshana as Shalu
- Thangadurai
- Boys Rajan
- Swaminathan
- Krishnamoorthy
- Scissor Manohar
- S. A. Chandrasekhar (Guest Role) as Sub Inspector of Police

== Production ==
In February 2012, Vijay announced his desire to remake his father S. A. Chandrasekhar's 1981 political drama Sattam Oru Iruttarai under his new production house of Ghilli Films and signed on Vikram Prabhu, son of actor Prabhu, to feature in the film. Piaa Bajpai signed lead actresses and Karthika Nair signed Supporting role, both of whom had appeared together in K. V. Anand's Ko, while newcomer Sneha, a visual communications graduate, was signed on as director. Despite early reports that Meena would be approached to play a role, Reemma Sen was subsequently signed on to play the powerful character of the police officer in the film, her first role after her marriage, while C. J. Rajkumar and Vijay Antony were announced as cinematographer and music composer of the project respectively. The film continued its shoot in Pondicherry in May 2012.

In June 2012, Vikram Prabhu revealed that he had trouble accommodating the film as his previous venture Kumki required the climax to be re-shot and thus asked the team to temporarily stall the project til October 2012 or find a new actor. Chandrasekhar went on to clarify that alternatives were being considered and the team were hoping to rope in either one of the actors Aadhi, Arun Vijay or Vishnu as a replacement or to pick a debutant. In mid June 2012, Chandrasekhar revealed that Vikram Prabhu had finally opted out of the project and following his departure, Piaa Bajpai more interest Bindhu Madhavi in this movie.Piaa bajpai playing supporting role in this movie but Karthika Nair not accepted lead role.karthika nair pulled out. Newcomer Arjun was first reported to have signed on to play the lead role, while Thananya, previously seen in Kunguma Poovum Konjum Puravum (2009), was also reported to have been roped in to replace Karthika. However this proved untrue, with Sneha confirming that newcomer Thaman Kumar would replace Vikram Prabhu, while Bindu Madhavi would also form a part of the final cast.

A part of the film was shot in Bangkok and Hong Kong.

== Soundtrack ==
Soundtrack was composed by Vijay Antony.

Sattam Oru Iruttarai

Soundtrack album Sattam Oru Iruttarai by Vijay Antony
- Released: 26 November 2012
- Recorded: 2012
- Genre: Film soundtrack
- Language: Tamil
- Label: Gemini Music
- Producer: Vijay Antony

Vijay Antony chronology
Daruvu (2012)	Sattam Oru Iruttarai (2012)	Haridas (2013)

No.	Song	Singers	Lyrics
1	"Aadam Eval"	Harini, Naresh Iyer	Na. Muthukumar
2	"Nimirnthu Nil"	Ajeesh, Santhosh	Annamalai
3	"Poochandi Paarvaiyil"	Srilekha Parthasarathy, Vijay Antony	Annamalai
4	"Thirumba Thirumba"	Andrea Jeremiah, Haricharan	Na. Muthukumar
5	"Uyire Uyire"	Deepak, Vandana Srinivasan	Na. Muthukumar

== Critical reception ==
CNN-IBN wrote:"Thaman Kumar showed signs of confidence, but struggled overall to deliver a satisfying performance".
