= Taman Akshaan =

Indian film actor

Thaman Kumar
- Born: Thaman Kumar; Chennai, Tamil Nadu, India
- Occupation: Actor
- Years active: 2012–present

Taman Akshaan (formerly Thaman Kumar) is an Indian film actor, who has worked in the Tamil industry.

== Career ==
Taman Akshaan was signed up for a film titled London Maappillai in 2011 to debut alongside actress Joshna Fernando, but the film failed to finish production, and thus his first release became the thriller Aachariyangal (2012). He replaced Vikram Prabhu in Sneha Britto's Sattam Oru Iruttarai after a successful audition and featured in the lead role opposite Bindu Madhavi and Piaa Bajpai. The film, a remake of the yesteryear film of the same name, was released with little publicity and failed at the box office, with a critic noting "Thaman Kumar showed signs of confidence". He is next seen in the comedy Summa Nachunu Irukku (2013). Taman Akshaan starred in the village drama Sethu Boomi (2015). In 2018, he appeared in horror anthology 6 Athiyayam. His next films was the thriller Nethra (2019).

Taman Akshaan is essaying the role of Chinrasu in the Tamil serial Vanathai Pola. He also featured in a role in films like Ayothi (2023). His next film was the investigative thriller Oru Nodi (2024). It was followed by two horror films, Park (2024) and Jenma Natchathiram (2025).

== Filmography ==
=== Films ===
Year	Film	Role	Notes	References
2012	Aachariyangal	Karthik		
2012	Sattam Oru Iruttarai	Vijay		
2013	Summa Nachunu Irukku	Kannan		
2015	Thottal Thodarum	Shiva		
2016	Sethu Boomi	Kumaran		
2017	Puyala Kelambi Varom	Jeeva		
2018	6 Athiyayam	Subramani	Super Hero segment	
2019	Nethra	Velu		
2022	Kanmani Pappa	Karthik		
2023	Ayothi	Kanagu		
2024	Oru Nodi	Parithi Ilamaran		
2024	Park	Mithran		
2025	Jenma Natchathiram	Ajay		

=== Television ===
Year	Serial	Role	Channel	Notes
2020–2021	Vanathai Pola	Chinrasu	Sun TV	replaced by Shreekumar
2020	Vada Da	Himself	Sun Music	
2021	Abhiyum Naanum	Chinrasu	Sun TV	Special appearance
2021	Poove Unakkaga	Chinrasu	Sun TV	Special appearance
