= A. Venkatesh =

Indian film director

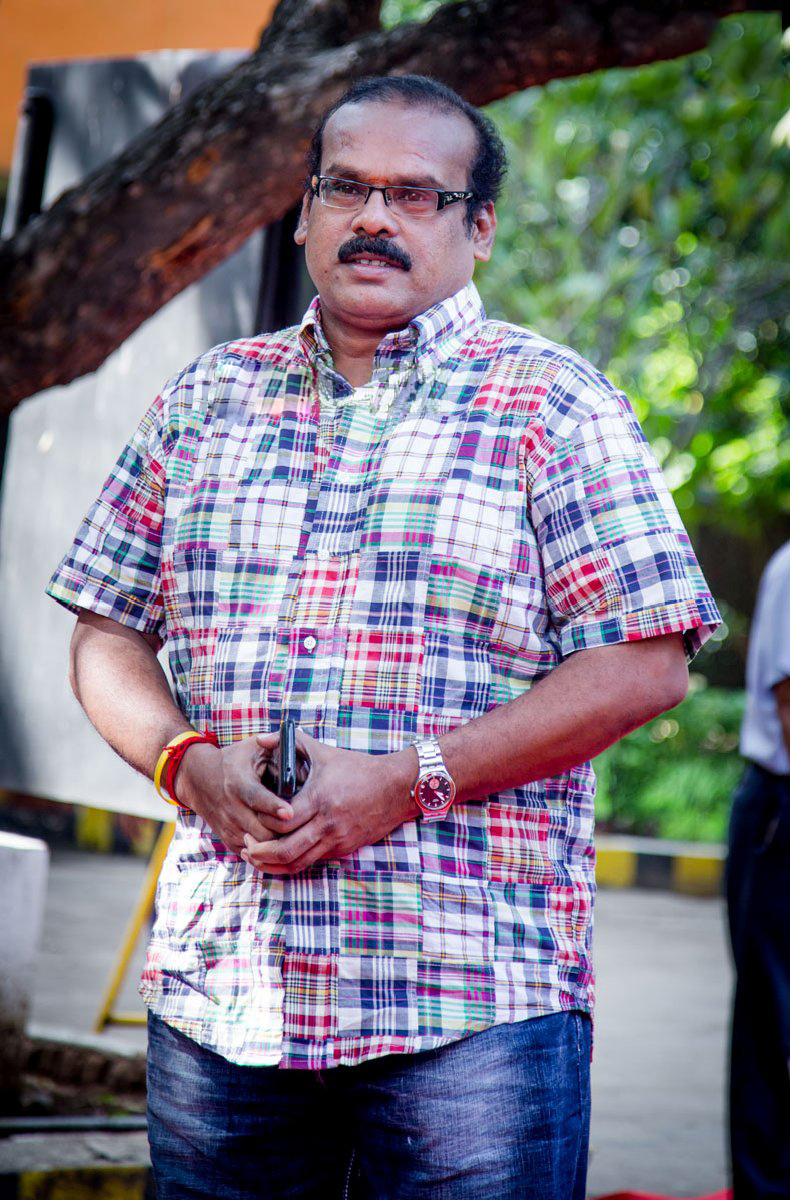
- Venkatesh at Sandamarutham Audio Launch
- Occupations: actor, director
- Years active: 1996–present

A. Venkatesh is an Indian film director and actor working in Tamil cinema. Beginning his career as an assistant, he directed his first film, Mahaprabhu, in 1996.

== Career ==
Initially, he worked as an assistant to director K. Rajeshwar on Nyaya Tharasu (1989) and Idhaya Thamarai (1990). He assisted Pavithran on Vasanthakala Paravai (1991) and Suriyan (1992), then he was an associate director to director Shankar on Gentleman (1993) and Kaadhalan (1994). During the shooting of the film Kaadhalan, producer G. K. Reddy approached him to direct a film. In 1996, he made his directional debut through Mahaprabhu starring R. Sarathkumar, Sukanya and Vineetha. He has directed Vijay's movies including action film Selva (1996) and romance film Nilaave Vaa (1998). In 1999, he directed a drama film Pooparika Varugirom starring Sivaji Ganesan, Vikram Krishna and Malavika.

Following the death of director Thirupathisamy in 2001, Venkatesh was briefly announced as the new director of the film Velan featuring Vijay and Priyanka Chopra, but the project was later shelved.

He started directing action movies with Prashanth's Chocklet (2001), Vijay's hit film Bhagavathi (2002), and Silambarasan's Dum (2003) and Kuthu (2004). These were followed by Sarathkumar's Aai (2004), Chanakya (2005) and Arjun's Vathiyar (2006).

During 2008, Venkatesh worked simultaneously on six productions, which were at different stages of completion. The Arjun-starrer Durai (2008) and Arun Vijay's Malai Malai (2009) were released first, while Sundar C's Vaadaa (2010) and Bharath's Killadi (2015) had delayed releases. Two further films, Prashanth's Petrol and Sarathkumar's Imaya Malai, were subsequently shelved mid-production.

He has also acted in various Tamil movies, notably Angadi Theru (2010). Venkatesh returned after a two-and-a-half year break with Nethra (2019). The filmmaker says the delay was because he had to fulfil commitments as an actor before he could get back to the direction. The film is a psycho-thriller based on a true event which he was witness to at an airport in Canada.

== Filmography ==
=== As director ===
Year	Film	Notes	Ref.
1996	Maha Prabhu	Credited as A. Venkatesan	
1996	Selvaa	Credited as A. Venkatesan	
1998	Nilaave Vaa	Credited as A. Venkatesan	
1999	Pooparika Varugirom		
2001	Chocklet		
2002	Bhagavathi		
2003	Dum		
2004	Kuthu		
2004	Aai		
2005	Chanakya		
2006	Vathiyar		
2008	Singakutty		
2008	Durai		
2009	Malai Malai		
2010	Maanja Velu		
2010	Vaadaa		
2010	Vallakottai		
2013	Summa Nachunu Irukku		
2015	Killadi		
2015	Sandamarutham		
2015	Rombha Nallavan Da Nee		
2019	Nethra		
2024	Operation Laila		
2024	Dhil Raja		

=== As actor ===
Year	Film	Role	Notes
1991	Vasanthakala Paravai		
1992	Suriyan	Telegram Office clerk	
1994	Kaadhalan	Cameo appearance	in "Kadhalikum Pennin" song
1998	Nilaave Vaa	Christian who prays at Hindu temple	
2010	Angaadi Theru	Karungali	
2011	Sattapadi Kutram	Ekambaram	
2011	Mahaan Kanakku	Maths Teacher	
2012	Paagan	Mahalakshmi's father	
2013	Azhagan Azhagi	Rathinavel	
2013	Naan Rajavaga Pogiren	Isakkimuthu Annachi	
2013	Summa Nachunu Irukku	Gautham (Dato)	
2014	Goli Soda	Vanmathi's father	
2015	Touring Talkies	Doctor	Anthology film; segment Love @ 75
2015	Rombha Nallavan Da Nee		
2015	Iravum Pagalum Varum		
2015	Pallikoodam Pogamale	Vijay's father	
2015	Sivappu		
2016	Pagiri	Madhu's father	
2016	Aandavan Kattalai	Gandhi's brother-in-law	
2016	Thodari	Thangapandian	
2017	Nisabdham	a public prosecutor	
2017	Kadugu	an Inspector	
2018	Onaaigal Jakkiradhai	Chithappu	
2018	Torchlight		
2018	Thodraa		
2019	Nethra	an officer	
2019	Asuran	Viswanathan	
2020	Nungambakkam	Advocate Durai	
2020	Alti		
2022	Oh My Dog	a moneylender	
2022	Nadhi		
2022	Laththi	Inspector Gnanamuthu	
2023	Rudhran	Ethiraj	
2023	Thuritham		
2023	Priyamudan Priya		
2024	Singappenney		
2024	Dhil Raja		
2025	Padai Thalaivan		
2025	Aan Paavam Pollathathu	Sakthi's father	
2026	Sathyavan Savithiri		
2026	Modha Rathri	Velayudham	
2026	Black Gold	Thangadurai	

=== Web series ===
Year	Program Name	Role	Network	Notes
2020	Triples	Councillor Chelladurai	Hotstar	Debut Web Series
2023	Mr. Manaivi	Vedhanayagam	Sun TV	Debut as an actor
2024	Goli Soda Rising	Vanmathi's father	Disney+Hotstar	
