= Thottal Thodarum =

2015 Indian film by Cable Sankar

- Directed by: Cable Sankar
- Written by: Cable Sankar
- Produced by: Thuvar Chandrasekar
- Starring: Thaman Kumar; Arundhati
- Cinematography: Vijay Armstrong
- Edited by: Sai Arun
- Music by: P. C. Shivan
- Production company: FCS Creations
- Release date: 23 January 2015
- Country: India
- Language: Tamil

Thottal Thodarum (transl. If touched, [it will] continue) is a 2015 Tamil-language romantic thriller film written and directed by noted critic and writer Cable Sankar. The film features Thaman Kumar and Arundhati in the lead roles, while Vincent Asokan plays a supporting role. It was released on 23 January 2015 and received mainly negative reviews from the critics. The film was a below average grosser at the box office.

== Cast ==
- Thaman Kumar as Shiva
- Arundhati as Madhu
- Vincent Asokan
- Balaji Venugopal as Gowtham
- Vijay Anand
- Ranjan
- Soodhu Kavvum Sivakumar
- Singapore Durairaj
- Dhruv
- Naveen Sitharaman
- Lakshman
- Meirajan
- Master Komagan
- Archana
- Surekha

== Soundtrack ==
Music by P. C. Shivan. (Song - Singers - Lyricist)

- "Bossu Bossu" - Anthony Daasan - Karky & Cable Sankar
- "Bossu Bossu" (Karaoke) - P.C.Shivan
- "Kiss Of The Dragon" - P.C.Shivan
- "Kiss Of The Fate" - P.C.Shivan
- "Penne Penne" - Karthik, Vandana Srinivasan - Na Muthukumar
- "Penne Penne" (Karaoke) - P.C.Shivan
- "Poo Pola Poo Pola" - Ganesh Venkatraman, Padmalatha - Na Muthukumar
- "Yaaruda Machan" - Sathya Prakash, Vandana Srinivasan -

== Critical response ==
The New Indian Express called it a "promising effort by a debutant and worth a watch". Sify wrote, "Cable Sankar's plot is ambitious and it is unique compared to some of the recent commercial films but falls flat...The problem here is that Cable Sankar has done his paper work with perfection but he missed a lot of things in screen transition". The Times of India gave 2 out of 5 and wrote, "the film fails to make good on its promise, despite the interesting set-up, mainly because of a tired, overlong romantic track with too many songs and dull conversations that just sap the energy out of it. Some of the scenes have a serial-like quality, there is an unsuccessful attempt at humour and the film takes a lot of time to get to the plot".
