= Satyam (2008 film) =

2008 film by A. R. Rajasekar

- Theatrical release poster of Tamil version
- Directed by: A. Rajasekhar
- Written by: A. Rajasekhar
- Produced by: Vikram Krishna
- Starring: Vishal; Upendra; Nayanthara
- Cinematography: R. D. Rajasekhar
- Edited by: Anthony
- Music by: Harris Jayaraj
- Production company: GK Film Corporation
- Release date: 14 August 2008
- Running time: 183 minutes
- Country: India
- Languages: Tamil; Telugu
- Budget: ₹27 crore

Satyam (transl. Truth) (Note: Also the title character.) is a 2008 Indian action film written and directed by A. Rajasekhar in his debut. The film was simultaneously shot in Tamil and Telugu titled as Salute, with a slightly different supporting cast. The film stars Vishal, Upendra and Nayanthara. It was produced by Vikram Krishna, Vishal's brother. The score and soundtrack were composed by Harris Jayaraj.

The film was released on 14 August 2008.

== Plot ==
The plot opens with Sathyam, an Assistant Police Commissioner rescuing a hooligan from encounter thirsty cops around the Napier Bridge in Chennai (Hussain Sagar at Hyderabad in Telugu version), only to arrest him later. He reminds his fellow cops that a cop's duty is to kill crime not criminals. In the meantime, he also has a romantic episode with Deivanayaki alias Deiva (Divya in Telugu version), a TV journalist. This begins with Deivanayaki suing the locality's children through their parents. The children swear vengeance through a 'gangleader' who happens to be none other than Sathyam himself. The 'gang' succeeds by making their rival a laughing stock with multiple pranks. Annoyance turns to love as Deiva and Sathyam get to know each other better.

Sathyam meets his first challenge in tracking a mysterious killer of three ministers. In the process, he finds the culprit named Manicka Vel (Prathap Rudra in Telugu version), only to receive a rude shock to know his identity. The murderer is none other than a former police officer based in Madurai (Pulivendula in Telugu version), who inspired Sathyam to become an honest police officer. Revealing the reason behind his change of mind, the ex-cop says that he is on a killing spree as he failed to set right things in khakhi uniform. Manickavel/Prathap Rudra is revealed to worked 15 years (3 years each in Salem and Madurai/Guntur and Vizag (Telugu), 4 Years in Thanjavur/Tirupati (Telugu), 5 years in Tirunelveli/Cuddapah (Telugu)). He has received awards from CM and rewards from PM for maintaining a clean and honest name without any blackmark.

Sathyam, who throws a challenge at his mentor that he would use the power of law to put the wrongdoers behind the bars, vows to throw light on the illegal activities of the Home minister Kondal Dasan (Kondal Rao in Telugu version), who aims for the Tamil Nadu's/Andhra Pradesh's Chief Minister post.

During his attempts to establish the truth, Sathyam faces various troubles. The Minister's proxies give him various troubles by killing children by offering them ice creams laced with drugs to eat and killing his mother. When Sathyam arrests Acharya, the Minister's proxy, and takes him to court, the Minister's henchmen attack him while driving and Sathyam is stabbed. Thillainayagam (Dilli Babu in Telugu version), the other proxy, shoots Acharya and blames Sathyam. Sathyam performs his mother's funeral rites and is suspended from the force and jailed. Manicka Vel, to be released the next day, feels sad for Sathyam and laments his loss in the jail. Thillanayagam runs for MLA with the Minister's support so that he cannot be harmed by Sathyam. He gloats to Sathyam at the jail about his newfound power and challenges Sathyam's honour and dignity.

At a public rally for Thillainayagam's candidature, Kondal Dasan openly challenges and insults Sathyam, who is released from jail by a sympathetic officer and coming to disrupt the public rally. Manicka Vel stands in the corner aiming to kill Thillainayagam and Kondal Dasan. Sathyam arrives and exposes the Minister and Thillainayagam by shooting them and forcing them to confess the truth about the Minister's intentions and the death of the proxy. Thillainayagam reveals everything about himself, Acharya, and Dasan. While lamenting the situation he is in and calling for reform, Sathyam is shot by the Minister's henchman and questions the honesty and trust his people and fellow officers have in him. Manicka Vel arrives on the scene and salutes Sathyam, with other officers following suit. A newscast is shown with Kondal Dasan and Thillainayagam being arrested and Sathyam is reinstated in the police force.

== Cast ==
Actor		Role	
Tamil	Telugu	Tamil	Telugu
Vishal		ACP K. Sathyam IPS	ACP K. Sathyam IPS
Upendra		Inspector Manicka Vel	Inspector Prathap Rudhra
Nayanthara		Deivanayaki alias Deiva	Divya
Kota Srinivasa Rao		Kondal Dhasan	Kondal Rao
Premgi Amaren	Ali	Bora	Bora
Senthil		N. Paneerselvam	N. Paneerselvam
Brahmanandam		Transport Office Broker	Transport Office Broker
Sudha Chandran		Sathyam's mother	Sathyam's mother
Tanikella Bharani		Deiva's father	Divya's father
Ravi Kale		Dilli (Thillainayagam/Dilli Babu)	Dilli (Thillainayagam/Dilli Babu)
Prabhu Nepaul		Acharya	Acharya
Jeeva		Punniyakodi	Punniyakoti
Hema		Deiva's mother	Divya's mother
Livingston		Politician	Politician
Santhana Bharathi		Minister Malarmannan	Minister Mahadevaya
Devan		Police Commissioner	Police Commissioner
Vinod Raj		DGP	DGP
Apoorva		Chandramathi	Chandramathi
Cheranraj		Swami	Swaminathan
Krishna Kumar		Mohammed	Mohammed
Avinash		Sathyam's father	Sathyam's father
Naren		Pandi	
Meera Krishnan		Pandi's wife	
Scissor Manohar		Politician's PA	Politician's PA
Baby Varsha		Varsha	Varsha

Dubbing artists

- Savitha Reddy for Nayanthara (both Tamil and Telugu versions)
- P. Ravi Shankar for Upendra (both Tamil and Telugu versions)
- Kathiravan Balu for Ravi Kale (Tamil version)
- M. S. Bhaskar for both Brahmanandam and Tanikella Bharani (Tamil version)
- Sudhakar for Livingston (Telugu version)
- Mallikarjuna Rao for Senthil (Telugu version)

== Production ==
Satyam is the directorial debut of A. Rajasekhar, previously an associate of Suresh Krissna. Vishal went through an intense workout regime for this role. He also sported a short-cropped hairstyle to look like a serious law-abiding police official. The film was simultaneously shot in Telugu as Salute. Each scene was shot twice as Vishal had to wear a Tamil Nadu Police uniform for the Tamil version and an Andhra Pradesh Police uniform for the Telugu version. Trisha Krishnan was originally selected be the lead actress in Sathyam. Later she was replaced with Nayanthara. The film marked the debut of Kannada actor Upendra in Tamil cinema. Flight scenes were shot in Chennai and Dubai, while a song sequence ("En Anbe") was filmed in Turkey. For the climax speech scene, Vishal sported a tonsured look for the first time to suit the scene. The visual effects were provided by Prasad EFX, and supervised by Craig Mumma, known for his work on numerous American films. The film has over 425 visual effects shots.

== Soundtrack ==
The film has five songs composed by Harris Jayaraj. Satyam was his 25th film as music composer, and the album was released in late July 2008 in Chennai, while the Telugu version's album was released the same month at Hyderabad.

Tamil track list
No.	Title	Lyrics	Singer(s)	Length
1.	"Aaradi Kaathe"	Pa. Vijay	Hariharan	4:46
2.	"Ada Gada Gada"	Pa. Vijay	Premji Amaren	5:02
3.	"Chellame Chellame"	Yugabharathi	Balram, Bombay Jayashree, Sunitha Sarathy	6:04
4.	"En Anbe"	Yugabharathi	Sadhana Sargam, Benny Dayal	6:07
5.	"Paal Pappaali"	Kabilan	Ranjith, Naveen, Mahathi	5:49
Total length:				27:48

Telugu track list
No.	Title	Lyrics	Singer(s)	Length
1.	"Nammara Nestham"	Sirivennela Seetharama Sastry	Hariharan	4:45
2.	"Ada Gada Gada"	Chandrabose	Premji Amaren	5:02
3.	"Muddula Muddula."	Sahithi	Balram, Bombay Jayashree, Sunitha Sarathy	6:00
4.	"Ninnena Nenu"	Sirivennela Seetharama Sastry	Sadhana Sargam, Benny Dayal	6:06
5.	"Endammaya"	Sahithi	Naveen, Mahalakshmi Iyer	5:46
Total length:				27:39

== Critical reception ==
Pavithra Srinivasan of Rediff.com wrote, "The movie is technically and visually well polished -- and that, in itself is a pity, as, without a good screenplay and execution, it falls flat". Sify wrote, "Debutant director A.Rajasekhar tackles the film half heartedly as he dilutes it with a lot of mass masala, which shifts the focus from the plot. The problem is that, story is wafer thin and the end product looks like a B-grade Telugu action movie". Malathi Rangarajan of The Hindu wrote, "Interesting in bits and pieces and gripping in fits and starts, GK Film Corporation’s Satyam (U/A), is a dampener of sorts. And if you walk out of the cinemas with a sense of disappointment, it’s because of A. Rajasekar’s inept screenplay".
