= Firose Khan =

Indian actor, screenwriter and director

- Born: 2 October 1969 (age 56); Thalassery, Kerala
- Occupations: Actor, screenwriter, director
- Years active: 2010–present
- Spouse: Manisha Khan
- Children: 2, including Yuvan

Firose Khan is an Indian actor, screenwriter, and director, who has worked in Tamil-language films.

== Career ==
Firose Khan, who was originally a Malayali from Kerala, received the opportunity to work in the Malayalam film Charithram (1989) as a junior artist and shot for a deleted scene in which he had to jump in a swimming pool at the VGP Universal Kingdom but endured a stomach injury. He worked as an assistant director to Thangar Bachan, Arun Pandian and Salangai Durai for Kathavarayan (2008). He was to work as a hero for the film Aasaiyila Paathi Katti but the film was dropped.

He made his lead acting debut in Thambi Arjuna (2010) in which he played Ramana's brother. A critic noted that "He fits in comfortably, and plays it like a seasoned veteran". He made his directorial debut through Pasakkara Nanbargal (2011) starring his son Yuvan. The film was based on kickboxing and Firose Khan played a coach in the film. A critic wrote, "The director has done his homework on the sport. It’s an exciting build-up to the finish, with a twist in the end". He played a negative role in Venmani (2011) and the unreleased Om co-starring Arjun before directing and co-starring in Keeripulla (2013), marking his second collaboration with Yuvan. Regarding the film, one critic noted, "Firose has concentrated on keeping the momentum going, but the film could have done with a more balanced, coherent screenplay" whilst another felt that "Had the director given the story some thought, ‘Keeripulla’ would have not been as forgettable as it has turned out to be".

== Filmography ==
- Note: all films are in Tamil, unless otherwise noted.

Year	Title	Credited as				Role	Notes	Ref.
Year	Title	Director	Writer	Producer	Actor	Role	Notes	Ref.
2010	Thambi Arjuna	Assistant	No	Yes	Yes	Dharma		
2011	Pasakkara Nanbargal	Yes	Yes	Yes	Yes	Khader		
2011	Venmani	No	No	No	Yes	Senthil		
2013	Keeripulla	Yes	Yes	Yes	Yes	Dorai		
2014	Thalakonam	No	No	No	Yes	ACP		
2015	Samrajyam II: Son of Alexander	No	No	No	Yes	Police Inspector	Malayalam film	
2017	Vilayattu Aarambam	No	Story	No	Yes	CBI officer		
