= Kandharvan =

2014 Indian film by Salangai Durai

- Directed by: Salangai Durai
- Written by: Salangai Durai
- Produced by: S. Duraisamy
- Starring: Kathir; Honey Rose
- Cinematography: Anil K. Sekar
- Edited by: SMV Subbu
- Music by: Alex Paul
- Production company: South Indian Productions
- Release date: 11 April 2014
- Country: India
- Language: Tamil

Kandharvan is a 2014 Indian Tamil-language romantic drama film directed by Salangai Durai and starring Kathir and Honey Rose.

== Cast ==
- Kathir as Mani
- Honey Rose as Meena
- Ganja Karuppu
- V. A. Andamuthu as Meena's father
- Kadhal Dhandapani as Lorry owner
- Crane Manohar as Lorry cleaner
- Chelladurai
- Vellai Subbaiah as Meena's relative
- Kovai Senthil as Broker
- Nellai Siva as Chicken seller
- Kamalesh as Mani's friend

== Production ==
The film began production in 2009. Kathir, who played a lorry driver in Salangai Durai's earlier film Kathavarayan (2008), was cast in this film as a water tank lorry driver. He practised lorry driving for the film. This was Malayalam actress Honey Rose's second Tamil film after Mudhal Kanave (2007), but the delay of the film meant that this was her fourth Tamil film after Singam Puli (2011). The climax was shot in Chennai.

== Soundtrack ==
The music was composed by Malayalam composer Alex Paul in his Tamil debut.

Track listing
No.	Title	Lyrics	Singer(s)	Length
1.	"Muthumaniye"	Kavin Sampath	Sheela Mani, Renjani Jose, Lizy Francis	4:59
2.	"Lakka Langatika"	Muthu Vijayan	Shankar Mahadevan	5:14
3.	"Kadal Kadal"	Valee	Srinivasan	4:29
4.	"Nerupai"	Muthu Vijayan	Karthik	4:40
5.	"Kadal Oru Pattam Poochi"	Viveka	Anita	5:23
Total length:				24:45

== Reception ==
A critic from The New Indian Express wrote that "The director’s earlier debut film Kathavarayan was a far better effort than this one". A critic from Dinamalar criticised the film for solely relying on the climax.
