= Anu Krishna =

Indian actress

- Occupations: Actress, model
- Years active: 2014–present

Anu Krishna is an Indian actress who has appeared in Tamil films. She has starred in Kaththi (2014) and Ilami (2016).

== Personal life and career ==
Anu Krishna is from a Malayali family in Chennai. She made her acting debut as a child actress, notably appearing in Bapu's Mahabhagavatham television series as Krishna, and then in Friends (2001) as the sister of Vijay's character. Anu Krishna made a career breakthrough as an actress with her appearance in AR Murugadoss's Kaththi (2014), where she again portrayed the sister of Vijay's character. In the mid-2010s, she appeared in a number of small budget roles as the lead actress including Chinnan Chiriya Vanna Paravai (2014) and Ilaignar Paasarai (2015). She notably was cast in the title role of a tribal villager in Ilami (2016), appearing alongside Yuvan in the film based on jallikattu. A critic from the Deccan Chronicle noted that she had "given a decent performance and was aptly cast", while a reviewer from Times of India gave the film a mixed review. She also appeared in supporting roles in films such as Inba Twinkle Lilly (2018) and 60 Vayadu Maaniram (2018).

In 2018, she appeared in Alai Pesi by Murali Bharathi. She later signed on to star in a film titled Kooli Padai by the same team, though the film did not have a theatrical release. Several other films that she worked on during the late 2010s, including Kottampatti Thodakka Palli, Eruma, Venkat Subramani Mic Set 123 and Kaliru, were completed but did not eventually release.

Her most recent release was Pitha 23:23. In 2023, her upcoming films include the biopic Sri Ramanujam and Eerattam.

== Filmography ==
Year	Film	Role	Notes
2001	Friends	young Amudha	
2013	Vellai Desathin Idhayam		
2014	Kaththi	Jeeva's sister	
2014	Chinnan Chiriya Vanna Paravai		
2015	Iru Kadhal Oru Kadhai	Jothi	
2015	Ilaignar Paasarai		
2016	Ilami	Ilami	
2018	Manushanaa Nee		
2018	Alai Pesi		
2018	Inba Twinkle Lilly		
2018	Poya Velaya Patthukkittu		
2018	60 Vayadu Maaniram	Madhavi	
2019	Shree Atharvana Prathyangira		Kannada film
2019	Arandavanuku Irundadhellam Pei		
2021	Idhu Vibathu Paghuthi		
2023	Dhillu Irundha Poradu		
2024	Pitha 23:23		
