= Onbadhule Guru =

2013 Indian film by P. T. Selvakumar

- Film poster
- Directed by: P. T. Selvakumar
- Written by: P. T. Selvakumar
- Produced by: S. Sivakumar; R. Sivakumar
- Starring: Vinay; Aravind Akash; Premji; Sathyan
- Cinematography: Chellathurai
- Edited by: P. Saisuresh
- Music by: K
- Production companies: Cosmo & Boss
- Release date: 8 March 2013
- Country: India
- Language: Tamil

Onbadhule Guru (transl. Jupiter in the 9th Position) is a 2013 Indian Tamil adult comedy film written and directed by P. T. Selvakumar. The film stars Vinay, Aravind Akash, Premgi and Sathyan. The film is about the adventurous trip that five guys take together, and what happens to them during their expedition. The film released on 8 March 2013 to negative reviews but declared as a decent hit. The title of the film refers to a prediction used in astrology.

== Plot ==
The story begins with a wedding having the bride, but the groom Guru is missing. The bride then decides to call Guru's friend Billa, who does not know where Guru is. A flashback then begins.

Running away from their lives due to various problems involving them, Billa, Ranga, and Kochadaiyaan, who are good friends, decide to live a bachelor life. However, before they head off, they decide to invite their good friend Guru. Despite the fact that Guru's wedding is in a few days time, he decides to join in the gang. The four friends then take an oath to live a bachelor's life and not reveal the truth that they are married. When they reach the city of Bangalore, they approach Charles, a college mate of theirs who is now a multimillionaire. Charles, at first, was scared of them as they teased him in college. After a change of mind, he decides to help them live their bachelor's life and bring them to a party. At the party, they see a model named Sanjana, who danced with them. After the party, Charles brings them to a private condominium where they stay. At the condom, they see Sanjana. The four of them try their best ways to get her as their girlfriend.

After all the adventures they had together with Sanjana, Guru decides to have a bachelor party as he is about to get married. However, the next day, Guru is missing, and the four friends end up being drunk while wearing police uniforms. Billa, Ranga, and Kochadaiyaan get caught by DSP Balram Naidu and soon are advised by him to love their wives and not leave them. After their encounter with Balram, they decide to search for Guru but get kidnapped. The trio ends up in a warehouse, and surprisingly, Sanjana appears. To be even more shocking, she appears as a gangster. It is then revealed that she is the mastermind who kidnapped Guru, as the four of them kept following her to win her heart, which was caught on videotape. She then asks them to give her Rs. 2 crores of money to release Guru such that he can make it for his wedding, and also such that they can take the videotape with them to avoid it being shared to others. They then get the money, give it to Sanjana, and run out of Bangalore, vowing to never see her ever again and taking good care of their wives.

Back in Chennai, they arrive in the nick of time for Guru's wedding, but just before the wedding commences, Apple, Billa's wife, stops the wedding and threatens everyone by using a time bomb attached to her waist. Billa consults her and apologizes. This follows with the four of them and Charles running away from her and reuniting with their wives. Charles's new wife is his college teacher, whom he loved back in college. Yet again, they run away, and thereafter, the story continues.

== Cast ==
- Vinay as Billa
- Aravind Akash as Kochadaiyaan
- Premji as Charles
- Sathyan as Ranga
- Chaams as Guru
- Lakshmi Rai as Sanjana
- Mantra as Neelambari
- Sona Heiden as Kumudhu Teacher
- Geetha Singh as Apple
- Hardika Shetty as Laddu
- Yogi Babu as Anniyan
- Roopashree as Maya
- K. S. Ravikumar as DSP Balram Naidu
- Shanmugasundaram as Chinna Gounder (Billa's father)
- Anjali Devi as Billa's mother
- Boys Rajan as Sivam (Kochadaiyaan's father)
- Manobala as Bun Rotti Babu
- Badava Gopi as Kamal
- Swaminathan as Velu Nayakkar
- T. P. Gajendran as Durai Singham
- Krishnamoorthy
- Chitra Lakshmanan as Gurukkal
- Yogi Devaraj as Priest
- Chaplin Balu as Kalla Saamiyar
- Powerstar Srinivasan as the narrator at the beginning and end of the film
- Perarasu in a special appearance

== Production ==
The film was first reported in January 2012, when it was announced that P. T. Selvakumar, PRO of Vijay and producer of Banda Paramasivam had decided to make his directorial debut in a film which starred four lead actors with Premji as one of the lead actors.

In October 2012, the film re-emerged with a new cast featuring Vinay, Aravind Akash and Sathyan alongside Premji. Roopashree made her debut in Tamil.

In January, shooting was going in Bangalore. A song sequence featuring Premji and Rai was shot in a club set with Vinay and Aravind Akash also in the scene. Srinivasan shot for an opening song in the film.

== Soundtrack ==
Music of the film is composed by K. The album will have five songs and the audio launch was held on 12 February. Actor Vijay and Jiva attended the occasion to release the album. The lyrics were penned by Na. Muthukumar, Madhan Karky and one more.

Track listing
No.	Title	Lyrics	Singer(s)	Length
1.	"Vaa Machi #3"	Na. Muthukumar	M. L. R. Karthikeyan, Mukesh Mohamed, Velmurugan
2.	"Vidhavidhamaga"	Madhan Karky	Vijay Prakash, Chinmayi
3.	"Theera Theera #2"	Na. Muthukumar	Anand Aravindakshan, K, Sean Roldan, Premji Amaren
4.	"Alayadhe Summa Summa #1"	Gnanakaravel	K
5.	"Maida Maidanam"	Gnanakaravel	Priya Himesh

== Critical reception ==
Rediff gave a rating of 2/5 and said, "The entire film is like a collection of comic scenes put together to make the audience laugh without much thought to the storyline". The Times of India gave a rating of 1/5 and said, "Amusingly, the actors seem to be having quite a bit of fun. But, for us, the movie is only as entertaining as waiting alone at a bus stop for hours."
