= P. T. Selvakumar =

Indian film director and producer

- Born: Rajakrishnapuram, Kaniyakumari - Tirunelveli district border
- Education: BA – History (Gold Medalist), LLB
- Alma mater: LMS Higher secondary school, Jamestown & Vivekananda College, Kanyakumari
- Occupations: Director, producer, Marketing Executive, public relations officer (PRO)
- Years active: 1994–present
- Spouse: S. Pon Selvi
- Children: 2

P. T. Selvakumar is an Indian film director, producer and public relations officer, who has worked in the Tamil film industry. and social worker in native location

== Career ==
Selvakumar started his career as a journalist before becoming associated with film director S. A. Chandrasekhar, who later appointed Selvakumar as his son Vijay's public relations officer (PRO). Selvakumar briefly also forayed into production during 2003, financing T. P. Gajendran's family drama, Banda Paramasivam (2003).

Selvakumar began working on his first directorial venture in January 2012, when it was announced that he had decided to sign up four actors with Nakul, Shiva, Santhanam and Premji Amaren selected. Priyamani was also soon after reported to have joined the cast, but the film was not officially announced. In October 2012, the film re-emerged with a new cast featuring Vinay Rai, Aravind Akash and Sathyan alongside Premji, while Raai Laxmi played the film's lead actress. Selvakumar's Onbadhula Guru (2013) shooting started from October 2012 and was released in early 2013 to negative reviews. Rediff.com gave 2 out of 5 stating "The entire film is like a collection of comic scenes put together to make the audience laugh without much thought to the storyline".

In 2014, he began working on the production of Puli (2015) directed by Chimbu Deven and featuring Vijay in the lead role. The movie received mixed to negative reviews. The failure of Puli had drastic effects on Selvakumar's personal life although he was desperate to release the film under any cirucmstance. His next film Pokkiri Raja (2016) was released to mixed reviews.

== Equality Pongal ==
Every year, he is takes part in conducting samathuva Pongal in Rastha kadu beach.

This year he is to Conducted The 12th Samathuva Pongal 2026 at Rasthakadu beach in Kanyakumari district. With 3006 pots and 5000 participated this event on 10-01-2026

== social service by Kalappai makkal iyyakam ==
He helped various forms in school buildings. He has built many cultural programme stage in kanyakumari district.

He take part in growth of Church, Temple construction.

He encouraging the volleyball, kabaddi, cricket team by various forms

== Political career ==
=== MNM ===
2021 Tamil Nadu Legislative Assembly election: Kanniyakumari
Party	Candidate	Votes	%	±%
AIADMK	Thalavai Sundaram	109,828	48.79	9.20
DMK	S. Austin	93,618	41.59	−0.82
MNM	P. T. Selvakumar	3,109	1.38	
AMMK	P. Senthil Murugan	1,599	0.71	
Margin of victory		16,210	7.20	4.38
Turnout		225,121	110.93	35.86
Rejected ballots		452	0.20	
Registered electors		202,943		
AIADMK gain from DMK		Swing	6.38	

=== DMK ===
He shared her willingness letter to join DMK and joined DMK on the Head office in Chennai on 11 December 2025. After that he got the Post of Joint Secretary in State Trade Team in DMK.

After 2 months later he said willingness to candidate in kanyakumari assembly election. But he not got that seat. On 07-04-2026 he shared publicly that I am supporting the ADMK candidate thalavai sundaram and planned to resign the post in DMK.

== Filmography ==
- All films are in Tamil, unless otherwise noted.

Year	Work	Credited as			Notes
Year	Work	Director	Producer	Actor	Notes
1994	Nattamai			Yes	Man who stand behind the Actor coundamani for selection of bride
1995	Vishnu			Yes	Muthu's Assistant
1996	Coimbatore Mappillai			Yes	Doctor (Cameo Appearance)
2003	Banda Paramasivam	Yes		Yes	as director and cake Shop Owner (Cameo Appearance)
2013	Onbadhule Guru	Yes			as director
2015	Puli		Yes		Producer of movie, The last & 300th film of Sridevi
2016	Pokkiri Raja		Yes		
2021	Jail		Partial	Yes	credited as First Copy Producer (cameo appearance in mutta parotta Song Adungada nalla adungada & GV prakash 's uncle)

=== As Press Relation officer (PRO) ===
Year	Title	Notes
2003	Vaseegara	Vijay's PRO
2004	Madhurey	Vijay's PRO
2005	Ghajini	
2006	Aathi	Vijay's PRO
2007	Pokkiri	Vijay's PRO
2007	Aalwar	
2007	Padikkadavan	
2007	Azhagiya Tamil Magan	Vijay's PRO
2007	Vel	
2009	Villu	Vijay's PRO
2009	Vettaikaaran	Vijay's PRO
2010	Sura	Vijay's PRO
2011	Kaavalan	Vijay's PRO
