= Middle Class Madhavan =

2001 film by T. P. Gajendran

- Poster
- Directed by: T. P. Gajendran
- Written by: T. P. Gajendran
- Produced by: K. R. Gangadharan
- Starring: Prabhu; Abhirami
- Cinematography: R. Raghunatha Reddy
- Edited by: Ganesh-Kumar
- Music by: Dhina
- Production company: K. R. G. Film International
- Release date: 18 May 2001
- Country: India
- Language: Tamil

Middle Class Madhavan is a 2001 Indian Tamil-language romantic comedy film written and directed by T. P. Gajendran. The film stars Prabhu and Abhirami, while Vadivelu, Vivek, Manivannan and others in supporting roles. The film explores the travails of newlyweds who are forced to live in a joint family. The film was remade in Telugu as Mee Intikoste Yem Istaru Ma Intikoste Yem Testaru. The music was composed by Dhina, and the film released on 18 May 2001.

== Plot ==
Madhavan, a young lawyer, works under a principled but struggling senior advocate. He shoulders the responsibility of his family, including his irresponsible father Perumal, sharp-tongued mother Pushpa, and two unmarried sisters, Maala and Neela. Abhirami, an orphan under Madhavan's senior's guardianship, works as an announcer at Chennai's SETC bus station. Manimaran, claiming royal lineage, seeks Madhavan's legal help and falls for Neela. Madhavan arranges Maala's marriage to Kuzhandaivelu, an auto driver with a secret drinking problem. The engagement is set in a theme park outside the city, where Abhirami, drawn by the happy family scene, meets Madhavan.

While buying wedding jewels, they bond, but a mishap leads to the loss of ₹125,000 (equivalent to ₹540,000 or US$5,600 in 2026) worth of jewels, money Perumal had given from his retirement fund. Madhavan is devastated, fearing his family's reaction. Abhirami offers to help Madhavan, but her guardian advises that she can access her inheritance only if she marries. He arranges their marriage, surprising Madhavan's family, who are already stressed about the sisters' weddings. Madhavan and Abhirami move in, and she graciously postpones their consummation, prioritizing the family's needs. Abhirami secretly uses her money to support the family, letting them believe it's Madhavan's earnings. Pushpa, however, gossips negatively about Abhirami.

With Abhirami's help, the sisters' marriages proceed smoothly. Maala's husband Kuzhandaivelu's drinking problem surfaces, and he moves in. Neela and Manimaran also stay, occupying the bedrooms. Madhavan and Abhirami sleep in the living area. Eager for intimacy, Madhavan plans and vacates the others in the house while Perumal is away on a religious trip to Sabarimalai, but it backfires when they get electrocuted in the bathroom. Abhirami gets transferred to Tindivanam, and Madhavan accompanies her, hoping for some alone time. However, their plans are foiled repeatedly, first on the train and then at the lodge due to a bomb hoax threat. Madhavan returns to Chennai, leaving Abhirami in Tindivanam.

Back home, Kuzhandaivelu and Manimaran's foolishness lands them in trouble, and they're attacked in custody. Madhavan bails them out, and they recover at his house, occupying the bedrooms again. Abhirami and Madhavan plan to meet on weekends, but their attempts are futile. They miss each other on buses, and their intimate life remains unfulfilled due to a lack of space. The son-in-laws' stay gets extended due to injuries, and Neela's pregnancy leads to Pushpa's hurtful comments, making Abhirami feel unwanted and infertile. She leaves for Tindivanam, feeling like an orphan, believing no one in the family likes her.

Soon Madhavan goes with his senior to a court case about a divorce, where the wife divorces her husband because he couldnt have intimacy, Madhavan's senior sided with the women and since the husband had no lawyer, Madhavan took over as his lawyer.

In the court case, Madhavan argues that intimacy isn't the only goal of marriage. His senior is shocked to learn Madhavan hasn't had a chance to be with Abhirami since their marriage. The senior advocate confronts Madhavan's family, scolding them for their insensitivity and prioritizing their own needs over the couple's. The family realizes their mistakes and apologizes to Abhirami and Madhavan. Perumal and Pushpa invite Abhirami to stay with them, and she eagerly accepts. On her way to Chennai, the bus meets with an accident, and the family is devastated when only her handbag is recovered. However, Abhirami is soon rescued, and the family apologizes again for their behavior.

The film ends with Madhavan and Abhirami finally having a private moment in a van, while Kuzhandaivelu and Manimaran drive, and the rest of the family travels above.

== Cast ==
- Prabhu as Madhavan
- Abhirami as Abhirami
- Visu as a senior advocate
- Vivek as Manimaran
- Vadivelu as Kuzhandaivelu
- Kaka Radhakrishnan as Manimaran's grandfather
- Delhi Ganesh as Perumal, Madhavan's father
- Ennatha Kannaiya as Govindasami, Kuzhandhaivelu's father
- Shyam Ganesh
- Jyothi Lakshmi as Manimaran's grandmother
- Revathi Sankaran as Pushpa, Madhavan's mother
- Shanmugasundari as Meenakshi, Kuzhandhaivelu's mother
- Radhika Chaudhari as Neela Manimaran, Madhavan's sister
- Tharani as Maala Kuzhandaivelu, Madhavan's sister
- K. K. Soundar as the advocate's client
- Kovai Senthil as Perumal's friend
- Nellai Siva as the advocate's driver
- Vellai Subbaiah as Perumal's friend
- Jayamani as Madhavan's neighbour
- LIC Narasimhan as a judge
- Manager Cheena as a judge
- T. P. Gajendran as Wayfarer (special appearance)

== Production ==
This was Vivek's 93rd film as actor and Vadivelu's 122nd.

== Soundtrack ==
The soundtrack was composed by Dhina with lyrics written by Vaali.

Track listing
No.	Title	Singer(s)	Length
1.	"En Success Theriyadha"	Harini
2.	"Hamma Hamma"	Srinivas, Harini
3.	"Ammamma Thaankaadhu"	Hariharan, Sujatha Mohan
4.	"Pakkam Nikkum Nila"	Mano, Anuradha Sriram, Pushpavanam Kuppusamy
5.	"Maappillai Otta"	Malaysia Vasudevan, Revathi Sankaran, Mano, Swarnalatha

== Reception ==
Savitha Padmanabhan of The Hindu wrote, "The plot gets too predictable after a point, but that is true of most films today. Prabhu's cherubic smile and effortless acting are plus points. Abhirami looks pretty as the homely wife. Delhi Ganesh flits in and out while Visu is at his didactic best. Vadivelu and Vivek do what they are adept at... raising a few laughs. But after a point they get quite tiresome, and even interfere with the main story. Music by Dhina is below average. In fact, the songs stick out like a sore thumb. The director has tried to raise a pertinent issue, but it could have been handled with finesse." Cinesouth wrote "The title misleads us to conceive a story with another dimension. Director T.P.Gajendran has a fine central theme for the story in Hollywood style. But alas! he has weakened the screenplay for no reason but the comedy comes handy to him. The high-class comedy gives him and the fans happiness alike, as an end-result." Visual Dasan of Kalki wrote TP Gajendran makes audience laughs without thinking about anything for two and a half hours. Malini Mannath of Chennai Online wrote "It is a neater film than the team's earlier film 'Budget Padmanabhan'. The script doesn't stray much here and the director is more focussed."
