= Magane En Marumagane =

- Theatrical release poster
- Directed by: T. P. Gajendran
- Written by: Krishna Da Vinci; T. Durai Raj (dialogues)
- Story by: T. P. Gajendran
- Produced by: T. P. Gajendran; M. Rajendran; M. Rajaratnam; M. Ravindran; M. Raghunathan
- Starring: Vivek; Mithun; Yamini Sharma
- Cinematography: Raja Rajan
- Edited by: Ganesh
- Music by: Dhina
- Production companies: Muthulakshmi Movies; Raj Television
- Distributed by: Raj Television Network
- Release date: 21 May 2010
- Country: India
- Language: Tamil

Magane En Marumagane (transl. Son, My Son-in-law) is a 2010 Indian Tamil-language comedy drama film written and directed by T. P. Gajendran. The film stars Vivek, Mithun, and Yamini Sharma, while Thenmozhi, Nassar, Saranya, Livingston, and Thambi Ramaiah play supporting roles. The music was composed by Dhina with cinematography by Raja Rajan and editing by Ganesh. The film was released on 21 May 2010.

== Plot ==
The "Jameendar" of a village on the foothills of Palani temple lives happily with his wife. The couple is liberal and spends all their money on the villagers. Enters Singapetti Singaram, a con, and his grandmother.

Singaram cons the Jameendar and marries his daughter Ponnarasi, whose brother Raghu, an IT professional and city slicker, is fiercely opposed to it. Singaram wastes his money in gambling and is defeated by his enemy. His enemy is killed, and Singaram is framed up in a murder case which he did not commit. He is then forced to leave the village. He comes to Chennai, turns a new leaf, and becomes a real estate tycoon overnight.

Meanwhile, Raghu, the bad brother, urged by his evil uncle, ditches his parents, who are left penniless on the street. When Singaram comes to the village and sees that the family became poor, Raghu learns that his uncle cheated his parents, and he is affected by a heart disease. In the hospital, Raghu's mother gave up her life to donate her heart to save her son. The film ends with Raghu marrying Thenmozhi.

== Cast ==
- Vivek as Singapatti Singaram
- Mithun as Raghu
- Yamini Sharma as Ponnarasi
- Thenmozhi as Thenmozhi
- Nassar as Jameendar
- Saranya as Jameendar's wife
- Livingston as Mahadevan, Raghu's uncle
- Paravai Muniyamma as Singaram's grandmother
- Thambi Ramaiah as Singaram's sidekick
- Lollu Sabha Manohar as Singaram's sidekick
- T. P. Gajendran as Priest
- Meenal
- Cell Murugan as 'Weightu' Veerasamy
- Rail Ravi
- Prabhu in a guest appearance
- Shreekumar in a guest appearance

== Production ==
The producers and director requested Kamal Haasan to appear in a guest role to promote organ donation, though the actor eventually did not feature.

== Soundtrack ==
The soundtrack is composed by Dhina. "Poda Vengayam" is remixed from the famous Rajini song "Raman Aandalum" from Mullum Malarum.

Magane En Marumagane

Soundtrack album by Dhina
- Released: 18 April 2010
- Genre: Soundtrack
- Producer: Dhina

Dhina chronology
Guru Sishyan (2010)	Magane En Marumagane (2010)	Pa. Ra. Palanisamy (2010)

Song	Singers	Lyrics
"Poda Vengayam"	Tippu, Ganga	Gangai Amaran
"Singampatti Oorula"	Chinnaponnu, Benny Dayal	Snehan
"Muruga Velmuruga"	Saindhavi	Snehan
"Laddu Paiya"	Anuradha Sriram, Vinaitha	Kirithiya
"Yaaradhu Yaaradhu"	Sadhana Sargam	Snehan

== Critical reception ==
Sify wrote "Magane En Marumagane, is not a fun movie. It is pure mush and melodrama, and looks like director TP Gajendran has etched the story from the 60?s and 70?s family glycerine tearjerkers".
