= Pasakkara Nanbargal =

Indian Tamil-language sports drama film

- Directed by: Firose Khan
- Written by: Firose Khan
- Produced by: Manisha Khan
- Starring: Ajmal Khan; Divya Nagesh; Firose Khan
- Cinematography: Mohanaraman
- Edited by: S. P. Ahamed
- Music by: Dhina
- Production company: Angel Film International
- Release date: 6 May 2011
- Country: India
- Language: Tamil

Pasakkara Nanbargal (transl. Affectionate friends) is a 2011 Indian Tamil-language sports drama film written and directed by Firose Khan, who co-stars in the film alongside Ajmal Khan and Divya Nagesh.

== Cast ==
- Ajmal Khan as Arun Joseph
- Divya Nagesh as Divya
- Radha Ravi
- Firose Khan as Khader
- V. Rishiraj as Rowdy
- K. Ravichandran
- Vennira Aadai Moorthy
- Usha Elizabeth as the police officer's wife
- Aditya
- T. K. Krishna
- Neelan
- Peranmai Velu
- Boys Rajan as the pedophile who misbehaves with Mani's sister
- Kottachi as Arun and Divya's classmate
- Muthuraj
- Maathi Yosi Gokul
- Mukesh
- Adhik
- Thambi Rajesh
- O. M. R. Anbu
- Bala Singh as Arun's grandfather (uncredited)

== Production ==
The film marks the directorial debut of Firose Khan and the acting debut of his then 15-year-old son Ajmal Khan, who trained in kickboxing under Shihan Hussaini for his role of an orphan. Child actress Divya Nagesh of Arundhati (2009) fame makes her lead debut. Firose Khan plays Yuvan's coach in the film. The climax was shot at the Bangalore Stadium.

== Soundtrack ==
The music was composed by Dhina. The audio launch took place on 18 May 2011 at Vani Mahal in Chennai with Rama Narayanan and S. P. Jananathan as the chief guests.

- "Rekka Katti Parakara" - Shravan, Charulatha Mani
- "Boom Boom" - Dr. Basha, Saindhavi
- "Amma Enbadu" - Madhu Balakrishnan
- "Amma En Amma" - Dhina

== Reception ==
A critic from The New Indian Express wrote, "The director has done his homework on the sport. It’s an exciting build-up to the finish, with a twist in the end".
