= Dhillu Irundha Poradu =

2023 Tamil film

- Directed by: S. K. Muralidharan
- Produced by: N. Saibaba; G. Haribabu
- Starring: Karthik Doss; Anu Krishna; Yogi Babu
- Cinematography: Vijay Thirumoolam
- Music by: G. Sayee Tharshan
- Production company: KP Productions
- Distributed by: RP Films
- Release date: 6 October 2023
- Country: India
- Language: Tamil

Dhillu Irundha Poradu (transl. If you got the guts, protest) is a 2023 Indian Tamil-language film directed by S. K. Muralidharan and starring Karthik Doss, Anu Krishna, and Yogi Babu in the lead roles. It was released on 6 October 2023.

== Cast ==
- Karthik Doss
- Anu Krishna
- Yogi Babu
- Vanitha Vijayakumar
- Thennavan
- Ramachandran Durairaj
- KPY Bala
- Manobala
- Chaams
- Lollu Sabha Manohar

== Production ==
The film was first announced under the title of Vella Kaka Manja Kuruvi in early 2015. In the following years, production continued slowly with further actors such as Vanitha Vijayakumar joining the cast. The title of the film was changed in time for an audio launch event for the film, that was held in January 2022.

== Reception ==
The film was released on 6 October 2023 across theatres in Tamil Nadu. A critic from Maalai Malar gave the film a negative review, calling it "low on logic, especially in the romantic scenes". A reviewer from Dina Thanthi noted that the filmmaker "failed to properly convey the film's message".
