= Theepetti Ganesan =

Indian actor (1990–2021)

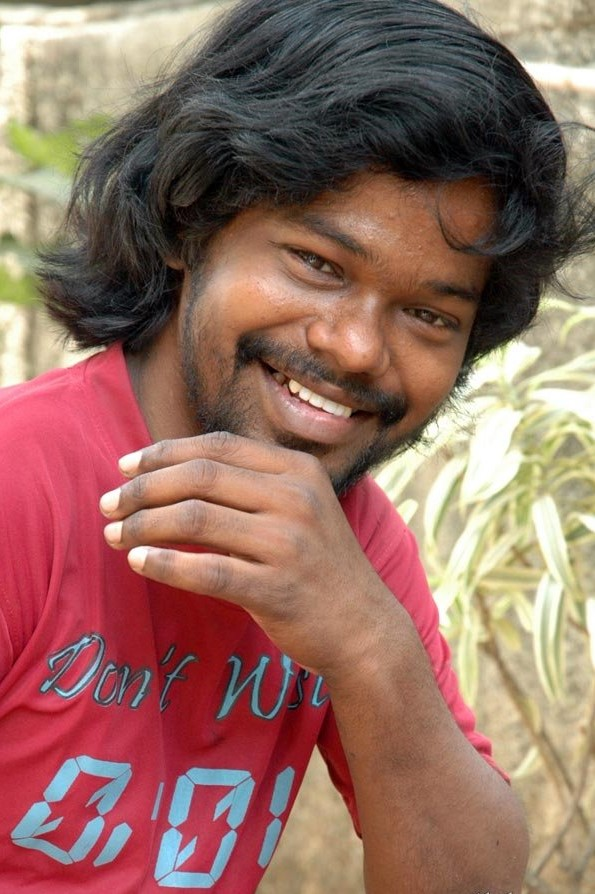
- Born: Karthik; October 16, 1990; Madurai, Tamil Nadu, India
- Died: March 22, 2021 (aged 30); Madurai, Tamil Nadu, India
- Occupation: Actor
- Known for: Renigunta
- Children: 2

Theepetti Ganesan (October 16, 1990 – March 22, 2021) was an Indian actor. He was known for playing prominent supporting roles in Seenu Ramasamy's directorial films. His breakthrough performance came in the film Renigunta (2009).

== Life ==
In April 2020, in an interview he revealed that he faced severe financial tussles due to lack of film opportunities in the last few years and revealed that his film career was hit hard during the COVID-19 pandemic. He also engaged in small scale businesses during the COVID-19 pandemic time in order to run his family. He also asked for financial assistance for his family and it was revealed that fellow actor Snehan had offered him financial assistance.

== Filmography ==
- All films are in Tamil, unless otherwise noted.

Year	Film	Role	Notes
2009	Renigunta	Prem Kumar a.k.a. Dabba	
2010	Thenmerku Paruvakaatru		
2011	Ayudha Porattam	Ganesh	
2011	Rajapattai		
2012	Kadhal Paathai		
2012	Ustad Hotel	Ismail	Malayalam film
2012	Billa II	Muthu	
2012	Neerparavai		
2014	Endrendrum		
2014	Kadhalai Thavira Verondrum Illai		Also playback singer
2015	Idam Porul Yaeval		Unreleased
2015	Buddhanin Sirippu		
2015	Thiruttu Rail		
2016	Paisa	Murugan's friend	
2016	Mandya to Mumbai	Jalendra	Kannada film
2018	Kolamavu Kokila		Special appearance in promotional song
2018	Thodraa	Shankar's friend	
2019	Kanne Kalaimaane	Kannan's friend	
2019	Natpuna Ennanu Theriyuma		
2023	Uruchidhai		Posthumous release
2023	Annamalaiyin Porulu		Posthumous release
TBD	Border		

== Death ==
He died on 22 March 2021 in Madurai due to illness. Prior to his death, he underwent treatment at Madurai Rajaji Hospital.
