= Vilayattu Aarambam =

2017 Indian Tamil-language film by Vijay R Anand and AR Suriyan

- Theatrical release poster
- Directed by: Vijay R Anand; AR Suriyan
- Screenplay by: Vijay R Anand
- Story by: Feroz Khan
- Produced by: Anand Utharkar
- Starring: Yuvan; Shravya
- Cinematography: Arunmozhi Chozhan
- Music by: Srikanth Deva
- Production company: MAG5 Studios
- Release date: 2 June 2017
- Country: India
- Language: Tamil

Vilayattu Aarambam (transl. The game's beginning) is a 2017 Indian Tamil-language action thriller film directed by Vijay R Anand and AR Suriyan and starring Yuvan and Shravya. The film is based on a true story regarding the collapse of a MLM company. It was released on 2 June 2017.

== Plot ==
Yuvan is a youth who hangs out with his four friends: Shah Rukh Khan, a man living thirty years in the past; Vijay, a basketball player; Amitabh Rajkamal; and Anand, a moneylender. He falls in love with a girl named Anjana and has a grudge against her brother Arjun Prabhakar, a police officer. Arjun warns Yuvan not to fall in love with Anjana, but he does so anyway. As a mark of revenge, Arjun gets involved in a scam involving an MLM company and puts the blame on Yuvan. How Yuvan comes out of this problem and reunites with Anjana forms the rest of the story.

== Cast ==
- Yuvan as Yuvan
- Shravya as Anjana
- Riyaz Khan as Arjun Prabhakar
- Srinivasan as Shah Rukh Khan
- Feroz Khan as CBI officer
- Bhanu Chander as Emcee
- Vasu Vikram

== Production ==
Yuvan was signed to play an unemployed IT worker in a film directed by the duo Vijay R Anand and AR Suriyan and lost some weight to prepare for the role. The film is based on a true story regarding the collapse of a MLM company. Riyaz Khan was brought to portray the antagonist.

== Soundtrack ==
The songs were composed by Srikanth Deva.

Song	Singers	Lyrics
"Adhiri Pudhiri"	Micheal Augustin, Hembabika, Deva	T. A. Ezhil Vendhan
"Endha Malai"	Deepak	Ruxeena
"Enn Uyirae"	Sooraj Santhosh	Ruxeena
"Nanba Nee"	Srikanth Deva	Tamizh
"Vidiyale"	Srikanth Deva	Indhumathi

== Release and reception ==
Vilayattu Aarambam was released on 2 June 2017 in Tamil Nadu, and a week later in Kerala. Maalai Malar wrote that the directors Suriyaan and Vijay R Anand had come up with a film to says that there is a widespread rumour that various scams are taking place in a company, which would bring in good income and thus eliminate unemployment in the country. Critic Malini Mannath wrote, "If there is any positive in the film, it’s that the directors have confined their story-telling to just about 120 minutes."
