= Keeripulla =

- Directed by: Firose Khan
- Written by: Firose Khan
- Produced by: Manisha Khan
- Starring: Yuvan; Disha Pandey; Firose Khan
- Cinematography: Mohanaraman
- Edited by: S. P. Ahamed
- Music by: Jeffrey
- Production company: Angel Film International
- Release date: 29 March 2013
- Country: India
- Language: Tamil

Keeripulla (transl. Mongoose) is a 2013 Indian Tamil-language romantic action drama film written and directed by Firose Khan, who co-stars in the film alongside Yuvan and Disha Pandey.

== Cast ==
- Yuvan as Keeri
- Disha Pandey as Sandhya
- Firose Khan as Dorai
- Saravanan as Naaga
- Ganja Karuppu
- Thambi Ramaiah as the bus conductor
- Ponnambalam as a police officer
- Nellai Siva as a police officer
- Vengal Rao as a police officer
- Usha Elizabeth as Sandhya's mother

== Production ==
As of early 2012, Disha Pandey had shot for fifteen days for the film. A small sequence was shot at the VGP Universal Kingdom.

== Soundtrack ==
All music is composed by Jeffrey.

Track listing
No.	Title	Singer(s)	Length
1.	"Kanavukul"	Piyush	4:13
2.	"Poar Vaal"	Bala Bharathy, Anandhu	3:26
3.	"Thalaivan"	M. L. R. Karthikeyan	4:09
4.	"Un Eera Kaanaal"	Haricharan	5:34
5.	"Vazhvu Ethu"	Priyanka	4:13
Total length:			21:35

== Release and reception ==
The film was released on 29 March 2013 alongside Kedi Billa Killadi Ranga, Chennaiyil Oru Naal and Azhagan Azhagi.

A critic from The Times of India rated the film one out of five stars and wrote, "‘Keeripulla’ is an unpretentious movie and from the word go we get a clear picture of what is in store". Malini Mannath of The New Indian Express wrote, "With chases and stunts and twists and turns weaved in for good measure, the director has attempted to keep the momentum going for the most part. But the excess of ‘shock’ elements, act as stumbling blocks through the film".
