= Kadhalai Thavira Verondrum Illai =

2014 Indian film by K. Selva Bharathy

- Poster
- Directed by: K. Selva Bharathy
- Starring: Yuvan; Saranya Mohan; Imman Annachi
- Cinematography: Bhoopathy
- Edited by: M. S. Bala
- Music by: Srikanth Deva
- Production company: Sen Movies
- Release date: 5 September 2014
- Country: India
- Language: Tamil

Kadhalai Thavira Verondrum Illai (transl. Besides love, there is nothing) is a 2014 Indian Tamil-language romantic comedy film directed by K. Selva Bharathy and starring Yuvan, Saranya Mohan and Imman Annachi. The film was released to highly negative reviews.

== Cast ==
- Yuvan as Anbu
- Saranya Mohan as Kamali
- Imman Annachi as Lawrence
- Theepetti Ganesan
- Rahul
- Rohith
- Chutti Aravind
- Annamalai Aravind
- Master Riyaan
- Harini Krishnan
- Gana Bala (special appearance in the song "Nokia Ponnu Samsung Paiyan")

== Production ==
After watching Pasanga (2009), K. Selva Bharathy was inspired to make a film on similar lines. After seeing Yuvan's photos in a dubbing studio, Selva Bharathy decided to cast him in the lead. Yuvan plays the role of a rude man through the first half of the film and the reason for his character to act that way is explained in the second half.

== Soundtrack ==
The music was composed by Srikanth Deva.

- "Nokia Ponnu" - Gana Bala, Simrutha
- "Kutti Kutti Thevathainga" - Akilesh, Simrutha
- "Deala No Deala" - Theepetti Ganesan, Simrutha
- "Kedi Boys" - Srikanth Deva
- "Verondrum Illai" (title song)

== Release and reception ==
The film had a low-key release on 5 September 2014 alongside Amara Kaaviyam, Pattaya Kelappanum Pandiya and Poriyaalan.

A critic from iFlicks wrote that "Director K.Selvabarathi has taken the film with children but failed to make it interesting. The confession scene which runs for five minutes gives a good social message. Songs are average in Srikanth Deva's music. Boopathi's cinematography is irritating" and criticised the acting of the leads. A critic from Webdunia wrote that the sarcasm of "Verondrum Illai, Verondrum Illai" (transl. Nothing else, nothing else) could be heard in the theater. This does not meet any of the standards of a good movie. Overall, this is a joke, war, surgery, a joke, a leg-splitting, trashy movie. A critic from Eniya Tamil called the film onum illai (transl. nothing), a play on the film's title. The critic criticized the film's acting and cinematography and felt that the film's music was okay.
