= Imman Annachi =

Indian actor

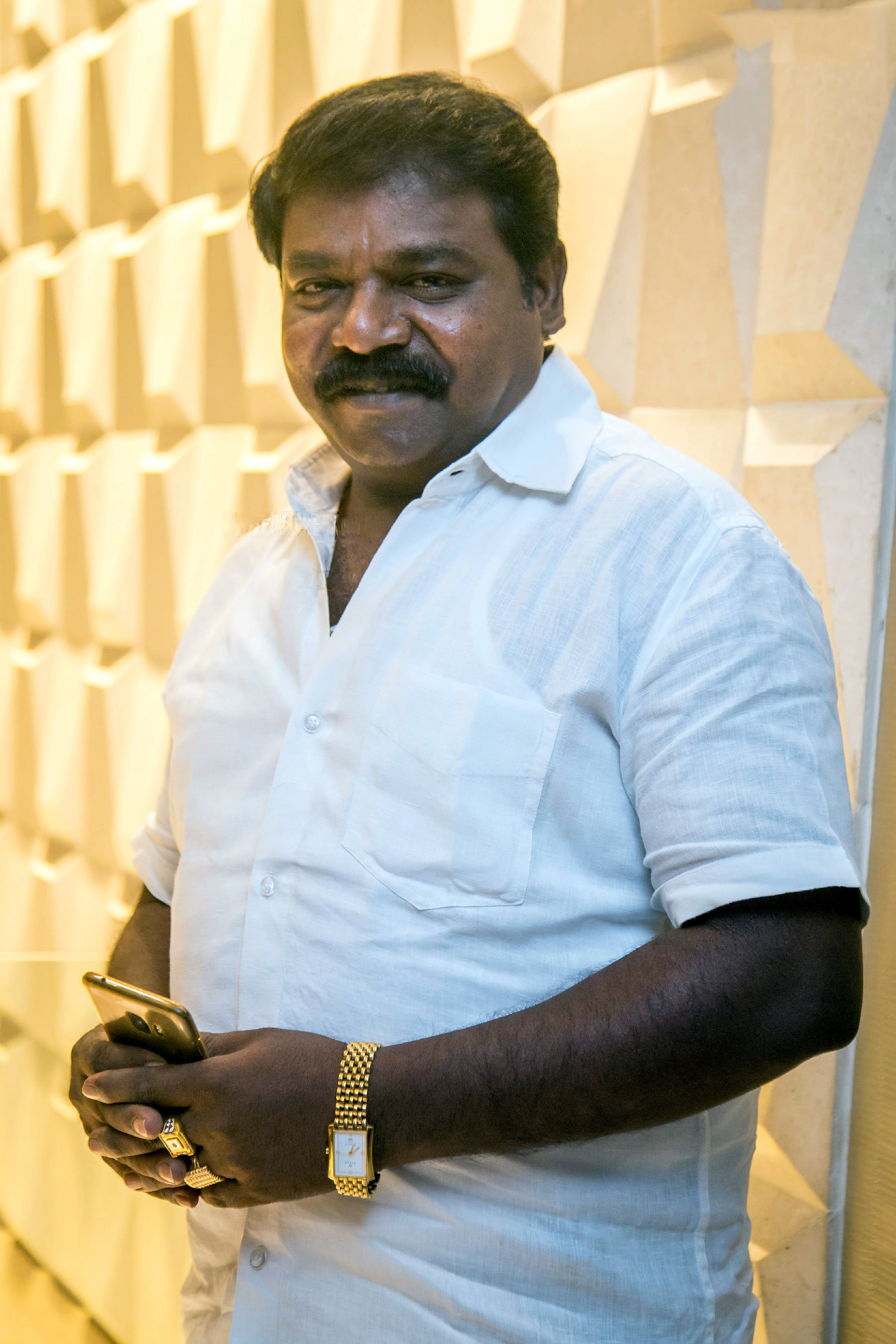
- Annachi at Saamy Square audio launch
- Born: 13 May 1967 (age 59); Thiruvaluthinadar Vilai, Eral, Thoothukudi District, Tamil Nadu, India
- Occupations: Actor, television presenter, politician, comedian
- Years active: 2006 – present

Imman Annachi (born 13 May 1967) is an Indian actor, television presenter, politician and comedian who has appeared in character roles in various Tamil films.

== Career ==
Imman Annachi made his debut hosting a show named Konjam Arattai Konjam Settai telecasted in Makkal TV. Imman Annachi made his breakthrough in Solluganne Sollunga on Adithya TV before moving on to work on the children's TV show Kutty Chutties on Sun TV.

He has done small roles in several films, some of which include Neerparavai (2012), Maryan (2013), Naiyaandi (2013), Goli Soda (2014), Madras (2014) and Kayal (2014). Some of his best-known works are Jilla (2014), Poojai (2014), Kakki Sattai (2015) and Puli (2015).

He got popularity in 2021 as he participated in Bigg Boss(Tamil season 5) as an original contestant and was praised for his humour sense in that show. But he also received hatred for his male chauvinistic attitude towards all the woman in the house especially Isaivani. He was one of the most stayed old contestant after Cheran, Vaiyapuri and Dhadi Balaji. He was eliminated on Day 70 from the house despite having many fans.

== Politics ==
Imaan Annachi joined DMK in April 2016 under the leadership of Kalaingar. He campaigned for the party for 2021 elections in Tamil Nadu.

== Filmography ==
=== Films ===
Year	Title	Role	Notes
2006	Thalai Nagaram	Right's gang member	
2006	Chennai Kadhal	Black ticket seller	credited as Eral D. Imman
2007	Kasu Irukkanum		Uncredited role
2007	Vel	Karadimuthu	
2009	Mariyadhai	Marthandam's supporter	Uncredited roles
2009	Vettaikaaran	Shanthi's relative	Uncredited roles
2010	Angadi Theru	Store worker	
2010	Baana Kaathadi	Police constable	
2011	Ko	Aalavandhan's sidekick	
2012	Vazhakku Enn 18/9	Dubbing artist for Pasanga Sivakumar	Uncredited role
2012	Mirattal	Police officer	
2012	Paagan	Restaurant owner	
2012	Please Close The Door		Short film
2012	Neerparavai	Annachi	
2013	Maryan	Kuttyandi	
2013	Naiyaandi	Tea shop owner	
2013	Ingu Kadhal Katrutharapadum		
2014	Jilla	Exam supervisor	
2014	Goli Soda	Manthiravadhi	
2014	Vidiyum Varai Pesu		
2014	Oru Modhal Oru Kadhal		
2014	Pongadi Neengalum Unga Kadhalum	Police officer	
2014	Adhu Vera Idhu Vera	Constable Kandasamy	
2014	Enna Satham Indha Neram	Zookeeper	
2014	Aindhaam Thalaimurai Sidha Vaidhiya Sigamani	Sivakarthikeyan	
2014	Puthiyathor Ulagam Seivom	'Robinhood' Ranga / Alex Pandian	Also playback singer
2014	Pattaya Kelappanum Pandiya	Anil Kundey	
2014	Kadhalai Thavira Verondrum Illai	Lawrence	
2014	Madras		
2014	Poojai	Guru	
2014	Kayal		
2015	Sandamarutham	Murugan	
2015	Kakki Sattai	Samarasam	
2015	Kaaval	Police	
2015	Palakkattu Madhavan	Samuthirapandian	
2015	Puli	Peter (Beta)	
2015	Thiruttu Rail	Das	
2016	Kathakali	Amudhavel's uncle	
2016	Kathiravanin Kodai Mazhai		
2016	Anjala	Jogging Chellapa	
2016	Pandiyoda Galatta Thaangala	Mansion owner	
2016	Kotigobba 2	Bus passenger	Kannada film
2016	Mudinja Ivana Pudi	Mani Annachi	
2016	Thodari	Stephen	
2017	Singam 3	Pushparaj	
2017	Maaya Mohini		
2017	Theru Naaigal	Krishnan	
2017	Guru Uchaththula Irukkaru		
2018	Nimir	Annachi	
2018	Saamy Square	SI Thangavelu	
2018	Itly	Cop	
2019	Kalavani 2	Nallathambi	
2019	Jackpot	Police constable	
2019	Butler Balu	Nellai Muthu	
2020	Pachai Vilakku	Vijay	
2020	Utraan		
2021	Kamali From Nadukkaveri	Subramani	
2021	Chasing	Police constable	
2021	Pei Mama	Pasupathy	
2021	Naruvi		
2022	Theal	Manickam Annachi	
2022	Pattampoochi	Fernandez	
2022	Yaanai	Mukkaiya	
2022	My Dear Bootham	Shop owner	
2023	Naan Kadavul Illai	Abdullah	Uncredited role
2023	Theerkadarishi		
2023	Yaadhum Oore Yaavarum Kelir		
2023	Pudhu Vedham		
2024	Singapore Saloon	Asirvadham Ayya	
2024	Local Sarakku		
2024	Operation Laila	Security	
2024	Arimapatti Sakthivel		
2024	Uyir Thamizhukku		
2024	Indian 2	Harish's uncle	
2024	Kavundampalayam		
2024	Dhil Raja		
2025	Ambi		
2025	Jinn - The Pet		
2025	Rajaputhiran		
2025	Mr Zoo Keeper		
2025	Panai		
2025	Nirvaagam Porupalla		
2026	Siva Sambo	London bridegroom	
2026	Vasool Mannan		
2026	Con City	Chutti Anna	

=== Television ===
List of performances and appearances on television
Year	Program	Role	Channel	Notes
2007-2008	Kolangal	Anwar	Sun TV	
2007–2012	Kasthuri	Annachi	Sun TV	
2014–2017	Kutti Chutties	Host	Sun TV	
2014–2018	Sollunganne Sollunga	Host	Adithya TV	
2017–2018	Asathal Chutties	Host	Adithya TV	
2019	Senior Chutties	Host	Sun TV	
2019	Gallapetti	Host	Colors Tamil	
2020	Kalakka Povathu Yaaru Season 9	Judge	Vijay TV	Judge in place of Ramya Pandian
2021	Azhagu Kutty Chellam	Host	Kalaingar TV	
2021	Chella Kutties	Host	Kalaingar TV	
2021	Bigg Boss Tamil - Season 5	Contestant	Vijay TV	Evicted day 70
2022	Raju Vootla Party	Appa	Vijay TV	
2024	Goli Soda Rising	Manthiravadhi	Disney+ Hotstar	
