= Puthiyathor Ulagam Seivom =

2014 Tamil film

- Poster
- Directed by: B. Nithyanandam
- Written by: K.S. Nagarajan Raja (also presenter)
- Story by: K.S. Nagarajan Raja
- Produced by: M. S. Jaikumar; K. N. Suriyakala
- Starring: Aajeedh Khalique; Anu; Yazhini; Suriyeshwaran; Pravin Saivi
- Cinematography: Balajiranga; Viswanathan
- Edited by: V. M. Uthayasankar
- Music by: Pravin Saivi
- Production company: Sri Teju Films
- Release date: 29 August 2014
- Running time: 125 minutes
- Country: India
- Language: Tamil

Puthiyathor Ulagam Seivom (transl. Let's create a new world) is a 2014 Indian Tamil-language children's drama film directed by B. Nithyanandam and written by K.S. Nagarajan Raja. The film stars an ensemble debut cast consisting of Super Singer fame Aajeedh Khalique, Anu, Yazhini, Suriyeshwaran, Pravin Saivi and others in the lead roles. Puthiyathor Ulagam Seivom was released in theatres on 29 August 2014.

== Cast ==
- Aajeedh Khalique as Ashwin
- Anu
- Yazhini
- Suriyeshwaran as Santhosh
- Pravin Saivi as Praveen
- Sandhya Prasath
- Master Roshan
- Algates Alagesan
- Naryanan
- Sanjay Sankar
- Santhosh Balaji
- Alan Francis
- Bhanuprakash
- Rekha Suresh as Raniyan's wife
- Bharath Kalyan
- Subha
- C. Ganesh in a cameo appearance
- Imman Annachi as 'Robinhood' Ranga / Alex Pandian
- Nellai Siva as Ashwin's grandfather

== Soundtrack ==
The film has music composed by Pravin Saivi.

Track listing
No.	Title	Length
1.	"Desam Engal Desam"	4:47
2.	"Rasa Nee Rosapoo"	4:00
3.	"Aiyrai Meenu"	2:16
4.	"Pala Nooru Pirai"	4:26
5.	"Isaiyil Vasamana"	4:40
6.	"Ezhu Naal Vaaram"	4:09
7.	"Idhu Vizhi Idam"	0:49
8.	"Puthiathor Ulagam Seivom"	2:21
Total length:		27:28

== Release and reception ==
Puthiyathor Ulagam Seivom released in theatres on 29 August 2014. Malini Mannath of The New Indian Express wrote, "The screenplay is too simplistic and the treatment amateurish. The children, all freshers, have played their parts adequately. While the first half is passable, the second half meanders and loses focus.[...] Puthiyor [sic] Ulagam Seivom is a good effort, but it could have been crafted in a more appealing way." Dinamalar partially praised Pravin Saivi's music, the cinematography and dialogues, while criticising its preachy screenplay. iFlicks praised the background score and the efforts taken by the adolescent lead actors to perform, while criticising the comedy sequences.
