= Ilami =

2016 Indian film by J. Julian Prakash

- Theatrical release poster
- Directed by: J. Julian Prakash
- Written by: J. Julian Prakash
- Starring: Yuvan; Anu Krishna; Akhil; Ravi Mariya
- Cinematography: Yuga
- Edited by: N.Sudha
- Music by: Srikanth Deva
- Production company: Parvin Productions
- Release date: 25 November 2016
- Running time: 109 minutes
- Country: India
- Language: Tamil

Ilami is a 2016 Indian Tamil-language historical drama film directed by J. Julian Prakash, based on the backdrop of Jallikattu. It stars Yuvan and Anu Krishna in the lead roles, with Akhil and Ravi Mariya in supporting roles, and Kishore in a guest appearance. Ilami had a low profile theatrical release on 25 November 2016. It won the Tamil Nadu State Film Award for Best Art Director.

== Cast ==
- Yuvan as Karuppu
- Anu Krishna as Ilami
- Akhil as Sadai Puli
- Ravi Mariya as Verayyan
- Kishore as a king (guest appearance)
- Thavasi

== Production ==
Julian Prakash revealed that he was inspired to make a film about vadam jallikattu as a result of his fascination with the sport, while growing up as a youngster in Madurai and called for more Tamil people to celebrate their culture. While rookie actors Yuvan and Akhil were cast in the film in the leading and lead negative roles, Anu Krishna, previously seen in Kaththi (2014), was signed on to portray the titular character. To resemble scenes from the year 1715, director Prakash and his team constructed a huge set in Talakona, a forested area in Andhra Pradesh. This came after the team trialled a smaller set at Theni, near Madurai, in Tamil Nadu, but found it difficult to find any place in the state that was untouched by 21st century development. To prepare for his role, actor Yuvan bulked up to resemble a tribal settler from the 18th century.

== Soundtrack ==
The music composed by Srikanth Deva.

Song	Singers	Lyrics
"Adi Aathadi"	Sooraj Santhosh	Jeevan Mayil
"Naan Enna"	Bala Subramaniyam	Jeevan Mayil
"Oh Ilami"	Divya Mahesh, Sooraj Santhosh	Palani Bharathi
"Thavil Eduthu"	Anthakudi Ilayaraja	Raja Gurusamy
"Theeparaka"	Anthakudi Ilayaraja	Raja Gurusamy

== Release ==
The film had a low key theatrical release across Tamil Nadu in November 2016. Anupama Subramaniam of the Deccan Chronicle wrote "that the director has narrated his story neatly, without much deviation and executed it well" adding that "Srikanth Deva’s music, cinematography by Yuga and art direction by John Britto aids the narration in a big way, but the graphically generated bulls are tacky", while concluding "though there are few flaws, nevertheless the film is worth a watch!" A reviewer from the Hindustan Times, noted "Given the budget constraints of a small independent director, Prakash’s effort is laudable, though one felt disappointed with Yuvan’s wooden performance and Krishna was of course expressively engaging". Another reviewer pointed out the crew's amateur film making process was an evident drawback of the film.
