= Thiruttu Rail =

2015 Indian film by Thirupathi

- Theatrical release poster
- Directed by: Thirupathi
- Produced by: Ravi Kumar; Saleem
- Starring: Rakshan Raj; Kethi
- Cinematography: Vijay Valsan
- Edited by: Maaris A
- Music by: Jayprakash
- Production company: SSS Movies
- Release date: 11 December 2015
- Country: India
- Language: Tamil

Thiruttu Rail (transl. Illegal train) is a 2015 Indian Tamil-language action drama film directed by Thirupathi and starring newcomers Rakshan Raj and Kethi. The film was released on 11 December 2015, after having been delayed due to heavy rainfall and the 2015 South India floods.

== Cast ==
- Rakshan Raj as Hari
- Kethi as Meena
- Charan Selvam as Saravanan
- Imman Annachi as Das
- Rajendran
- Shanmugarajan
- Mayilsamy
- Pasanga Sivakumar
- Pandi
- Sendrayan as Ram
- Theepetti Ganesan

== Soundtrack ==
The songs are composed by Jayprakash.

Track listing
| No. | Title | Singer(s) | Length |
|---|---|---|---|
| 1. | "Theme Songs" | Gana Bala, Jayprakash |
| 2. | "Oviyame" | Balraman, Jayprakash |
| 3. | "Ennai Katti Potta" | Divakar, Jayprakash |
| 4. | "Cittu Cittu" | Gana Bala, Jayprakash |
| 5. | "En Devathai" | Haricharan, Jayprakash |
| Total length: | | | 18:35 |

== Reception ==
The film received negative reviews from critics. The Times of India gave the film one out of five stars and stated that "In capable hands, Thiruttu Rayil would have made for an engaging action film, but for almost half its running time, the director, Thirupathi, chooses to focus on the mundane stuff — scenes of young men drinking and talking pointlessly, and a romantic track between two uninteresting characters". The Hindu wrote that "There isn’t one redeeming aspect in Thiruttu Rail. The songs are mediocre, the acting bad, the story disconnected, and the comedy unfunny". A critic from The New Indian Express wrote that "Interesting in parts, Thiruttu Rail would have made for a great action-thriller, if the script and narrative had been consistent". The film was also reviewed by Maalai Malar.
