= Thambi Arjuna =

- Directed by: Vijay R. Anand
- Written by: Vijay R. Anand
- Produced by: G. M. Balaji; Manisha Khan
- Starring: Ramana; Feroz Khan; Ashima Bhalla
- Cinematography: Madhavraj Datar
- Edited by: S. P. Ahamed
- Music by: Dhina
- Production company: Angel Film International
- Release date: 30 July 2010
- Running time: 135 minutes
- Country: India
- Language: Tamil

Thambi Arjuna (transl. Younger Brother Arjuna) is a 2010 Tamil-language action film directed by Vijay R. Anand. The film stars Ramana, newcomer Feroz Khan and Ashima Bhalla, with Arun Pandian, Suman, newcomer Sharmila, Bala Singh and Rajendran playing supporting roles. It was released on 30 July 2010. It was dubbed into Hindi as Bhai Arjuna.

== Plot ==
Arjuna, who studies aeronautical engineering in Australia, returns to Chennai after a two-year absence and reminisces about the events that had led him to leave the country.

Arjuna and his elder brother Dharma were orphans who were brought up by the rowdy Mani. Dharma did not want his brother Arjuna to follow in his footsteps and made his brother study aeronautical engineering. Dharma then left Mani's gang and became a powerful don. Arjuna was in love with Radhika, the daughter of Police Commissioner Vedagiri. Radhika also fell in love with him, but when she learned of his brother's profession, she felt pessimistic. To fulfil his brother's wish, Dharma requested Vedagiri to give his daughter in marriage to his brother, but Vedagiri humiliated Dharma and beat him up with his shoe. An angry Arjuna beat Vedagiri in turn with his shoe in front of Radhika and told him that he did not want to marry Radhika anymore. After this incident, Arjuna went back to Australia, and Dharma left his don life. Dharma surrendered himself to the government, and he was thus leading a peaceful life.

Back to the present, Mani sequesters Dharma and requests Arjuna to save Radhika who was abducted by a tribe, and in return, Mani promises to release his brother. Mani is in fact following Vedagiri's instruction. Arjuna then saves Radhika, who is still in love with him, but Vedagiri cannot forget the humiliation and wants to take revenge on Dharma and Arjuna. The Chief Minister gives free rein to the police to end rowdyism and orders to encounter all the rowdies, including the reformed don Dharma. The police shot all the rowdies, including Mani and Dharma's right-hand man Kaaka. The film ends with Dharma and Vedagiri shooting each other to death.

== Cast ==
- Ramana as Arjuna
- Feroz Khan as Dharma
- Ashima Bhalla as Radhika
- Arun Pandian as Chief Minister
- Suman as Vedagiri, Radhika's father
- Sharmila as D. Bhuvana
- Rajendran as Mani
- Bala Singh as Kaaka
- Rekha as Radhika's mother
- Lollu Sabha Manohar as Manohar
- Yuvarani
- Usha Elizabeth
- Nadhisha as Fardeena
- Master Parthiban as D. Karthik
- Master Arif as Ashok

== Production ==
The director, Vijay R. Anand, has worked in the industry for fifteen years. Feroz Khan signed to play the Ramana's brother, Suman played a tough policeman while Ashima Bhalla was chosen to play the heroine. During the shooting of the climax, a freak fire accident caused severe injuries and burns to the heroine Ashima Bhalla. The scene required her to be surrounded by fire and kerosene was poured around her accordingly. But suddenly due to a freak accident, the fire caught up with her and her legs were completely burned. She was then taken to the hospital immediately.

== Soundtrack ==
Thambi Arjuna

Soundtrack album by Dhina
- Released: 28 April 2010
- Recorded: 2010
- Genre: Feature film soundtrack
- Length: 29:58
- Producer: Dhina

Dhina chronology
| Pa. Ra. Palanisamy (2010) | Thambi Arjuna (2010) | Gowravargal (2010) |

The film score and the soundtrack were composed by Dhina. The soundtrack features 6 tracks with lyrics written by Na. Muthukumar, Yugabharathi and Uma Subramaniam.

| No. | Title | Lyrics | Singer(s) | Length |
|---|---|---|---|---|
| 1. | "Hajarea Hajarea" | Na. Muthukumar | Hariharan, Fardeen Khan, Rita | 4:44 |
| 2. | "Mazhai Megam Mazhai" | Na. Muthukumar | Unni Menon, Prasanna, Dhina, Saindhavi | 5:00 |
| 3. | "Puligal Konjam" | Yugabharathi | Aabavanan, Dhina | 5:09 |
| 4. | "Nalla Mazhai" | Yugabharathi | Anuradha Sriram | 4:15 |
| 5. | "Neeye Neeye" | Uma Subramaniam | Rita, Krish | 4:20 |
| 6. | "Puligal Konjam" | Yugabharathi | Shankar Mahadevan, Dhina | 5:09 |

== Critical reception ==
The New Indian Express said, "The first half had a tangible script to back all the sound and fury of the musical score. There are some ably choreographed chase scenes [..] In the latter part, the situations loose out on conviction, the logic lop-sides and the motivation and behaviour of the characters are confusing". S. R. Ashok Kumar of The Hindu wrote, "the director has gone wrong with the measure of essential cinematic ingredients".
