= Dhina =

- Born: Padma Dinakaran; 15 January 1966 (age 60); Coimbatore, Tamil Nadu, India
- Occupations: Film composer, Music director
- Years active: 1996 – present

Dhina (also credited as Dheena) (born on 15 January 1966) is an Indian composer who predominantly works in Tamil film and television series.

== Biography and career ==
Dhina first worked as an assistant musician under composer G. K. Venkatesh, later being engaged by Ilaiyaraaja as a music conductor. He later became a music director for several Tele serials scoring for the title tracks. Some of his popular title scores for the serials include Chitthi, Annamalai, Ninaivugal, Payanam, Nambikkai, Chellamay, Metti Oli among others. It was the Radhika produced hugely popular teleseries Chitthi that gave Dhina a very big break.

Dhina's first big break in Tamil cinema came through a comedy film Middle Class Madhavan released in 2001. Since then, he has scored music for various films in various languages including Telugu and Kannada films.

Dhina debuted in the 2012 film Soozhnilai as an actor.

== Political career ==
On 23 August 2018 he joined T. T. V. Dhinakaran's Amma Makkal Munetra Kazhagam. Now, he is with BJP and has been appointed as the state chief of Overseas and other states Tamil development wing.

== Discography ==
=== Tamil films ===
Year	Title	Score	Songs	Notes
1996	Vasantha Vaasal	Yes	No	
2000	Annai	Yes	Yes	
2001	Middle Class Madhavan	Yes	Yes	
2001	Naan Paada Ninaipathellam	Yes	Yes	Film unreleased
2002	King	Yes	Yes	
2003	Thiruda Thirudi	Yes	Yes	
2003	Anbe Un Vasam	Yes	Yes	
2004	Kadhal Sarigama	Yes	Yes	
2004	Jana	Yes	Yes	
2005	Aayudham	Yes	Yes	
2005	Thirupaachi	Yes	Yes	
2005	Iyer IPS	Yes	Yes	
2005	Kicha Vayasu 16	Yes	Yes	
2005	Ambuttu Imbuttu Embuttu	Yes	Yes	
2005	Manthiran	Yes	Yes	
2006	Kokki	Yes	Yes	
2006	Kaivantha Kalai	Yes	Yes	
2006	Yuga	Yes	Yes	
2006	Nee Venunda Chellam	Yes	Yes	25th Film
2006	Maranthen Meimaranthen	Yes	Yes	
2007	Pori	Yes	Yes	
2007	Karuppusamy Kuththagaithaarar	Yes	Yes	
2007	Nee Naan Nila	Yes	Yes	
2007	Thullal	Yes	Yes	
2007	Polladhavan	Yes	Yes	
2008	Kannum Kannum	Yes	Yes	
2008	Sandai	Yes	Yes	
2008	Dindigul Sarathy	Yes	Yes	
2009	Vedigundu Murugesan	Yes	Yes	
2009	Malayan	Yes	Yes	
2009	Anthony Yaar?	Yes	Yes	
2009	Kandhakottai	Yes	Yes	
2010	Guru Sishyan	Yes	Yes	
2010	Magane En Marumagane	Yes	Yes	
2010	Pa. Ra. Palanisamy	Yes	Yes	
2010	Thambi Arjuna	Yes	Yes	
2010	Gowravargal	Yes	Yes	
2010	Vallakottai	Yes	Yes	
2010	Ithanai Naalai Engirunthai	Yes	Yes	Film unreleased
2011	Seedan	Yes	Yes	
2011	Bhavani IPS	Yes	Yes	
2011	Pasakkara Nanbargal	Yes	Yes	
2012	Medhai	Yes	Yes	
2012	Soozhnilai	Yes	Yes	Also actor
2012	Maasi	Yes	Yes	
2013	Ego	Yes	No	
2015	Iravum Pagalum Varum	Yes	Yes	50th Film
2019	Thanimai	Yes	Yes	

=== Other language films ===
Year	Title	Songs	Score	Language	Notes
2001	Naagulamma	Yes	Yes	Telugu	
2001	Shivappa Nayaka	Yes	Yes	Kannada	
2002	Grama Devathe	Yes	Yes	Kannada	
2002	Adrushtam	Yes	Yes	Telugu	
2003	Dhanush	Yes	Yes	Telugu	
2004	Donga Dongadi	Yes	Yes	Telugu	Remake of Thiruda Thirudi
2018	Udumbara	Yes	Yes	Sinhala	
2025	Bhartha Mahasayulaku Wignyapthi	Yes	No	Telugu	1 song only; remix of "Aaraneekuma Ee Deepam" song

=== Television ===
- 1999 Maru Piravi
- 1999 Chithi
- 1999 Chinna Papa Periya Papa
- 1999 Dhik Dhik Dhik
- 2000 Nimmathi Ungal Choice V - Manasatchi
- 2000 Pushpanjali
- 2000 Indira
- 2001 Vaazhkkai
- 2001 Nambikkai
- 2001 Choti Maa Ek Anokha Bandhan (Hindi remake of Chithi)
- 2001 Kaveri
- 2001 Jee Boom Baa
- 2001 Alaigal
- 2001 Vaazhnthu Kaattugiren
- 2002 Nagamma (Telugu)
- 2002 Metti Oli
- 2002 Gopi
- 2002 Annamalai
- 2002 Mandhira Vaasal
- 2002 Police Diary
- 2003 Payanam
- 2003 Sorgam
- 2003 Ninaivugal
- 2003 Marupiravi
- 2003 Nee Naan Aval
- 2004 Manaivi
- 2005 Aarthi
- 2005 Sruthi
- 2006 Ninaivugal
- 2008 Gokulathil Seethai
- 2009 Chellamey
- 2011 Thulasi
- 2012 Bommlattam
- 2012 Thyagam
- 2014 Maragatha Veenai
- 2015 Aadhira
- 2017 Nandini
- 2017 Vidhi
- 2019 Pandavar Illam
- 2019 Chocolate
- 2020 Chithi 2

=== As singer ===
- Kootanchoru - Aayudham

== Awards ==
He has been awarded the Kalaimamani award by the Government of Indian state Tamil Nadu in 2021.
