= Inba Twinkle Lilly =

2018 Indian Tamil-language film

- Theatrical release poster
- Directed by: R. K. Vidhyadaran
- Written by: R. K. Vidhyadaran
- Produced by: Babu Thooyavan
- Starring: Saranya Ponvannan; Kovai Sarala; Kalpana
- Cinematography: Barani Kannan
- Edited by: Meenachi Sundaram
- Production company: Appu Movies
- Release date: 29 June 2018
- Running time: 152 minutes
- Country: India
- Language: Tamil

Inba Twinkle Lilly (also known as Itly) is a 2018 Indian Tamil-language heist comedy film written and directed by R. K. Vidhyadaran. The film stars three female characters (as grandmothers): Saranya Ponvannan, Kovai Sarala and Kalpana. Manobala, Chitra Lakshmanan, Mansoor Ali Khan, Ashmitha, Imman Annachi, and Devadarshini play supportive roles in the film.

The movie was titled as Itly, which was previously titled as Inba Twinkle Lilly as its full form and is the acronym of the three main female characters: Inba (Saranya), Twinkle (Sarala), and Lilly (Kalpana).

The film is produced by Babu Thooyavan under the production banner Appu Movies, and it also does not have any songs. The film was released on 29 June 2018 and received extremely negative reviews from the audience and critics upon its release.

== Synopsis ==
Inba's college-going granddaughter, Ashmitha, is suffering from a serious health problem, and she needs money costing around 6 lakhs. Inba, along with her close friends Twinkle and Lilly, cooperate together to raise money, and while depositing money in the bank, they end up losing it due to a bank robbery led by a terrorist named Kalluthu and his gang. The bank manager refuses to help the trio as the money was not deposited at the time of the robbery. Then they find themselves under tremendous pressure to raise money to rescue Ashmitha, so they hatch a plan to rob the bank where they lost their money along with China, who is Twinkle's love interest. Then, the police and media cover the bank. After a lot of struggles, they come out safely. Afterwards, they get to know that Ashmitha has no disease, but she is stuck with a big problem. The problem is a gang that takes bad videos of women and asks for money. However, the video of Ashmitha is uploaded for not giving money. How they save Ashmitha's life forms the rest of the plot.

== Cast ==
- Saranya Ponvannan as Inba, close friend of Twinkle and Lilly
- Kovai Sarala as Twinkle, close friend of Inba and Lilly
- Kalpana as Lilly, close friend of Inba and Twinkle
- Manobala as China, Twinkle's love interest
- Mansoor Ali Khan as Kalluthu (Terrorist)
- Ashmitha as Ashmitha
- Imman Annachi as Inspector Ekambaram
- Devadarshini as Sub-Inspector Sivagami
- Vennira Aadai Moorthy as Astrologer
- Chitra Lakshmanan as Bank Manager
- Swaminathan as Ashmitha's father
- Pandu as Producer
- Crane Manohar as Spiritual Astrologer
- Delhi Ganesh as Doctor
- Anu Krishna
- Athulya Ravi as reporter (uncredited)

== Release ==
The film was released on 29 June 2018, two years after the death of actress Kalpana who also starred in the film and was also her last feature film. The film was criticised for weak writing and poor joke sequences which caused negative impacts to the film at the box office.
