= Puli (2015 film) =

2015 Indian film by Chimbu Deven

- Theatrical release poster
- Directed by: Chimbu Deven
- Written by: Chimbu Deven
- Produced by: Shibu Thameens; P. T. Selvakumar
- Starring: Vijay; Sridevi; Prabhu; Sudeep; Shruti Haasan; Hansika Motwani
- Narrated by: Nizhalgal Ravi
- Cinematography: Natty Subramaniam
- Edited by: A. Sreekar Prasad
- Music by: Devi Sri Prasad
- Production companies: Thameens Films; SKT Studios
- Distributed by: Sri Thenandal Films (Tamil Nadu); Ayngaran International (Wide release); Thameens Films (Kerala); S. Narayan (Karnataka); Chiragdeep International (North India)
- Release date: October 1, 2015 (India)
- Running time: 154 minutes
- Country: India
- Language: Tamil
- Budget: ₹87—130 crore (Note: News 18 estimates the film's budget to be ₹87 crore (US$9.3 million). Daily News and Analysis India estimates the film's budget to be ₹100 crore (US$11 million). Hindustan Times estimates the film's budget to be ₹118 crore (US$13 million). The New Indian Express estimates the budget to be ₹130 crore (US$14 million).)
- Box office: ₹101 crore

Puli (transl. Tiger) is a 2015 Indian Tamil-language fantasy action adventure film written and directed by Chimbu Deven. It is produced by Shibu Thameens and P. T. Selvakumar under Thameens Films and SKT Studios. The film stars Vijay in a dual role, alongside Sridevi, Prabhu, Sudeep, Shruti Haasan, Hansika Motwani, and Nandita Swetha. It marks Sridevi's return to Tamil cinema and her final Tamil film before her death. The film revolves around the clash between humans and demons (Vedhalams) in a Kingdom ruled by demons, where the protagonist fights for justice, of the ruthless slaughtering of humans by demons, but his ancestry turns out to be a mystery.

Puli's original Tamil version was released worldwide on 1 October 2015 in theatres, whilst the dubbed versions of Telugu, Hindi and Malayalam were released the following day on 2 October 2015. The film received mixed-to-negative reviews from critics who praised the cast performances especially from Vijay and Sudeep and visual effects while the screenplay and writing received criticism. Despite being a below average venture at the box office, it recovered the budget investment through profit in satellite and digital rights. The film was screened at the Tokyo International Film Festival, Japan.

== Plot ==
Marudheeran (half tiger-demon and half human) is the adopted son of a tribal village chief named Vembunathan. From a young age, he notices the atrocities regularly committed on the villagers by soldiers from the neighbouring kingdom of Vedhalapuram called the Vedhalams, who have supernatural powers. When he becomes an adult, Marudheeran starts to protect the villagers from the Vedhalams. As a result, the villagers respect him.

Marudheeran falls in love with Pavalamalli. And they both get married secretly and tell and take blessings from Vembunathan. Vembunathan tells them to visit the temple before announcing their marriage to everyone. When Marudheeran is in the temple, Pavalamalli is kidnapped by a group of Vedhalams, who then ransack the village and also kill Vembunathan. Marudheera and his close friends Kodangi and Sama begin a journey to Vedhalapuram. During the voyage, Marudheeran rescues Manthagini, the princess of Vedhalapuram, from a panther. That time, Princess Manthagini falls in love with Marudheeran. Thalapathy Jalatharangan, the evil-minded demon, Commander-in-Chief of Vedhalapuram, notices this. On the pretext of being medicine makers, Marudheeran, Kodangi, and Sama enter the Vedhalapuram palace, where they meet Yavanarani, the cruel Queen of Vedhalapuram and a sorceress. She allows them to stay at the palace, and Marudheeran wins the support of the Queen and the love of Manthagini with his fighting prowess and resilience. Yavanarani announces the engagement between Marudheeran and Manthagini.

Later, Marudheeran discovers he is a half-Vedhalam (half-demon). Marudheeran was the son of Pulivendhan (powerful tiger-demon) and Pushpa (human princess). Pulivendhan was the late prince of Vedhalapuram, Yavanarani's younger brother and Manthagini's uncle. When he stood up to Jalatharangan, who used to terrorise the citizens of Vedhalapuram with the help of his henchmen, Jalatharangan killed him and his wife, Pushpa. Marudheeran also discovers that Yavanarani is actually a puppet Queen under the influence of evil magical power emanating from Jalatharangan's ring. Due to the evil magical influence, Yavanarani developed magical powers and her tyrannical behaviour. She performs yearly Kanya Puja to boost her magical powers. After Yavanarani performs the Kanya Puja for the 18th consecutive year (this time on Pavalamalli), Jalatharangan has planned to eliminate her and take over the throne.

Marudheeran also discovers that he will transform into a Vedhalam (demon) if he stops taking the demon power suppression medicinal leaf that he was consuming from his childhood. Marudheeran transforms into a demon, fights Jalatharangan and kills him, avenging his father's death. Still, before he dies, he opens his ring, releasing all the evil magical power so that Yavanarani can continue to rule Vedhalapuram as a tyrantess without his control after his death. Marudheeran realises that the Queen can be returned to normal only if her wand, which is the source of her magical power, is destroyed. Marudheeran and Manthagini find her performing the Kanya Puja on Pavalamalli. After a bitter sword fight with the Queen, he manages to smash the wand, thus restoring the Queen to herself. In gratitude for releasing her from the evil magical influence, Yavanarani makes Marudheeran heir to the throne of Vedhalapuram.

== Cast ==
- Vijay in a dual role as:
  - Marudheeran
  - Pulivendhan, Marudheeran's father
- Sridevi as Demon Queen Yavanarani, Pulivendhan elder sister and Marudheeran's paternal aunt
- Prabhu as Vembunathan, Marudheeran's foster father
- Sudeep as Senadhipathy Jalatharangan
- Shruti Haasan as Pavalamalli
- Hansika Motwani as Princess Manthagini, Yavanarani's daughter
- Thambi Ramaiah as Kodangi, Marudheeran's friend
- Sathyan as Sama, Marudheeran's friend
- Nandita Swetha as Pushpa, Pulivendhan's wife and Marudheeran's mother
- Vijayakumar as Pulivendhan and Yavanarani's father, the Vedhala king and Marudheeran's grandfather
- Karunas as Sooran
- Ali as Karki Newton, the Liliput King
- Aadukalam Naren as Cholan
- Joe Malloori as Herbalist
- Robo Shankar as Albert alias Alpha
- Imman Annachi as Peter alias Beta
- Vidyullekha Raman as Einstein Kamalakshi alias Gamma
- Jangiri Madhumitha as Tharagamangalam
- Vadivukkarasi as Villager
- Tinnu Anand as Sage
- Raveena Daha as Marudheeran's sister
- Gayathri Raman as Parimala
- Jasper as Jalatharangan's assistant
- Sangili Murugan as Washerman
- Ajay Rathnam as Pei-azhagu Kuruvi
- Sugunthan as Vedhalam
- Sampath Ram as Vedhalam

== Production ==
=== Pre-production ===
Chimbu Deven was reported to be working on a "fantasy film set in contemporary times" in January 2011 for UTV Motion Pictures, and Dhanush was subsequently signed on to play the leading role. The film was titled as Maareesan, with G. V. Prakash Kumar and Kathir signed on as composer and cinematographer respectively. At the same time, the team revealed filming would start in late 2011. Hansika Motwani was confirmed to play the leading female role in the film, while Vadivelu was also reported to be a part of the cast. However, in October 2011, UTV Motion Pictures left the project citing the escalating budget and Aascar Films replaced them as producers. The project later failed to take off, and the actor and director moved on to work on other ventures. During the production of his Oru Kanniyum Moonu Kalavaanikalum (2014) in late 2013, Chimbu Deven restarted preliminary work on the fantasy film and narrated the script to Vijay, who expressed interest in being a part of the project. Subsequently, the project found producers in P. T. Selvakumar, Vijay's press relations officer, and Shibu of Thameen Films, who have previously distributed several of Vijay's films across Kerala. The two producers came together to form a new production house, SKT Films and announced that production would begin after the completion of Vijay's work in AR Murugadoss's Kaththi (2014).

=== Development ===
Although early reports suggested that A. R. Rahman would be the film's music composer, the team later confirmed Devi Sri Prasad had been signed. Natty Subramaniam chose to continue his work as a cinematographer with the film, despite his acting success in Sathuranga Vettai (2014), revealing he was excited to work alongside such an ensemble cast. T. Muthuraj was announced as the film's art director and began work alongside his commitments in Shankar's I (2014), while lyricist Vairamuthu also joined the crew. The team also picked five costume designers to take care of clothing for the actors, with Manish Malhotra, Deepali Noor, Chaitanya Rao, Siva and Sai all brought on board. Furthermore, four stunt choreographers were selected to take care of action scenes with international technicians Sang Lin and Pradit Seeluem, brought in to work alongside Sunil Rodrigues and Dilip Subbarayan. National Award winner, R.C Kamalakannan was signed on to be in charge of the film's animations and special effects, PhantomFx, a Chennai-based VFX company known for the movie Indru Netru Naalai, handled most of the VFX shots, and the rest were split among several studios. Chimbu Deven subsequently worked on finalising the script of the film between January and August 2014. Chimbu Deven and Natty scouted locations in Kerala in August 2014, finalising schedules in Chalakudi and Nelliyampathy.

=== Casting ===
In April 2014, reports suggested Kannada actor Sudeep was approached to play a parallel leading role in the film, while contrasting reports noted he would play the lead antagonist. Sudeep later confirmed his participation in the film, adding it would see him in a "first of its kind" role. The team then successfully signed on actress Sridevi to portray a supporting role of a princess in the film, with the actress appearing in a Tamil film for the first time in 29 years. This was her final Tamil film before her death in 2018. Another senior actor, Prabhu, also signed on after being approached by the director to portray a character role.

Chimbu Deven revealed that the film would feature two leading female roles to appear alongside Vijay. Initial reports had linked Priyanka Chopra and Deepika Padukone to the roles, but high remuneration subsequently meant neither were signed. Shruti Haasan confirmed that she had signed the film in July 2014, making a comeback to Tamil films after a two-year hiatus following 3 (2012). Hansika Motwani was added to the cast after pairing up with Vijay in Velayudham. She portray a princess, the daughter of Sridevi's character. Thambi Ramaiah and Vidyullekha Raman were also selected to portray roles in the film, while comedians Sathyan, Robo Shankar and Imman Annachi joined the team in the first schedule. A press release in early January 2015 added actors Naren, Vijaykumar, Ali, Karunas and Joe Malloori to the film's cast. In April 2015, Nandita Swetha joined the cast to play a small and pivotal role, after Bhavana had turned down the offer. Gayathri Raman stated that she had portrayed Shruti's mother in the film.

=== Filming ===
The team began filming on 10 November 2014 at the Aditya Ram Studios on the East Coast Road, Chennai, where a song featuring Vijay and Hansika Motwani was shot in a set replicating a castle put up by art director, T. Muthuraj. The team then set up base in Pannaiyapuram for a forty-five-day stint, with hundreds of extras and technicians gathered from neighbouring states. A second schedule continued throughout December, after which it was reported that the film was twenty per cent complete. After a Christmas break, production restarted in early January 2015, and carried on in the outskirts of the city until mid-January. Reports which suggested that the team had secured permission to film at the Mysore Palace was dismissed by the makers as speculation.

The film had begun shoot without a title and had been widely referred to in the media as Vijay 58. Other titles such as Garuda, the script's original name Maareesan, Maru Dheeran and Por Vaal were also registered by the producers, while finalising on a title. The team consequently confirmed the title as Puli in early January 2015, after having bought the rights from director S. J. Surya.

== Music ==
Puli

Soundtrack album by Devi Sri Prasad
- Released: 2 August 2015
- Recorded: 2015
- Genre: Feature film soundtrack
- Length: 25:51
- Language: Tamil
- Label: Sony Music India
- Producer: Devi Sri Prasad

Devi Sri Prasad chronology
Srimanthudu (2015)	Puli (2015)	Shivam (2015)

The film score and soundtrack was composed by Devi Sri Prasad collaborating with Vijay for the third time after Sachein (2005) and Villu (2009). The audio rights of the film were sold to Sony Music India. The album features six tracks, all of them were written by lyricist Vairamuthu.

The song teaser of "Yendi Yendi" sung by Vijay and Shruti Hassan, was released on 24 July 2015. The audio launch event was held on 2 August 2015. The event was telecasted live in YouTube.

All lyrics are written by Vairamuthu.

Tamil Version
No.	Title	Singer(s)	Length
1.	"Puli Puli"	Mano, Priyadarshini	4:34
2.	"Yendi Yendi"	Vijay, Shruti Haasan	4:13
3.	"Jingilia Jingilia"	Javed Ali, A. V. Pooja	4:24
4.	"Sottavaala"	Shankar Mahadevan, M. M. Manasi	4:09
5.	"Manidha Manidha"	Tippu	3:45
6.	"Mannavanae Mannavanae"	Chinmayi Sripaada, Sooraj Santhosh, M. L. R. Karthikeyan, Anitha Karthikeyan	5:26
Total length:			25:51

== Marketing ==
The first look poster was released on 21 June 2015, ahead of Vijay's 41st birthday; and on his birthday, the makers revealed the teaser trailer of the film. The promo song teaser of "Yendi Yendi" was released on 24 July 2015, in order to promote the audio launch of the film. The trailer of this film is supposed to be released on 2 August 2015, during the film's audio launch, but it was not confirmed by the makers.

The first trailer of the film was released through YouTube on 19 August 2015. The trailer became the first Tamil film to hit 100k likes, and also became the most liked Indian trailer on YouTube, beating the previous record held by Kick. In order to promote the film, the makers released a new promo song, featuring the music composer Devi Sri Prasad on 14 September 2015. The second trailer of the film was released on 23 September 2015. The makers released an action 3D game for Puli on Google Playstore, Windows Store and Apple Store. A 3D game titled Epic Clash was released based on the characters of Puli.

== Release ==
=== Theatrical ===
Puli was initially slated to release, coinciding with the Ganesh Chathurthi festival on 17 September 2015. But the release was postponed due to heavy work of computer graphics in the film. The makers finally zeroed on 1 October 2015, as the release date, which also coincides veteran actor Sivaji Ganesan's birthday and also announced that the film would be dubbed and released in Telugu and Hindi languages, both versions released on 1 October 2015 along with the Tamil version. Tamil Nadu theatrical rights for the film were bought by Sri Thenandal films. Ayngaran International purchased the overseas rights while Thameens purchased the Kerala distribution rights. The Karnataka distribution rights were purchased by the Producer and director S. Narayan. Telugu rights were bought by SVR Cinema. North India release rights were acquired by Pahlaj Nihalani. The film was also released in China and Japan.

PT Selvakumar, the producer of the film Puli described the project as a major professional setback, stating that its failure undermined nearly three decades of his work. He emphasised the severity of the impact by noting that such a loss might have driven someone else to consider self-harm, highlighting the emotional and financial strain caused by the film’s poor performance.

== Reception ==
=== Box office ===
On the first day, it collected ₹10.75 crore in Tamil Nadu. It grossed ₹28.6 crore worldwide on its opening day Thursday. In the second day the film grossed ₹27.5 crore worldwide. It collected ₹3.87 crore in four days in Kerala. In the first weekend, the film collected ₹64 crore worldwide, with ₹2.84 gross in Chennai city alone beating S.S Rajamouli's Baahubali, as the latter collected only ₹1.64 crore;

=== Critical response ===
The film received mixed reviews and poor ratings from film critics. On the review aggregator website Rotten Tomatoes, 0% of 9 critics' reviews are positive, with an average rating of 3.3/10.

The Times of India rated the film 2.5/5, stating "Puli (Tiger) is your Indian cinema version of Gulliver and the Lilliput's fairy tale. A lavishly mounted fantasy adventure, at the core it is basically a love story." Latha Srinivasan of Daily News and Analysis gave the film 2.5/5 stars, deeming the film a "visual treat" with a disappointing screenplay. She praised the cinematography, visual effects and performances of the cast, but criticised the story, noting that the genre might be new for Tamil cinema, but "the story is not something new and it moves at such a slow pace that it gets tiring to watch in places." Bollywood Hungama rated the film 2/5, writing, "On the whole, PULI is a strictly average fare. Watch it if you are a Sridevi or a Vijay fan. Otherwise, this fantasy is a bore fest."

Saibal Chatterjee from NDTV rated the film 2/5, writing that "Puli gets two stars for ambition and scale, but none for execution." Raja Sen rated the film 1.5/5, writing, "Clearly Puli needs you to make (or carry) your own entertainment." Mumbai Mirror rated the film 1.5/5, writing, "Fantasy films allow defying logic, physics and biology, as long as it fascinates. This one makes a jaded attempt to recreate tested ideas and wages a war against one's brain cells." The Indian Express rated the film 1.5/5, writing, "The bigger the film doesn't always mean the greater it is, and there can't be a better example of this than Vijay's big-budget fantasy drama "Puli", which isn't a bad film, but worse." India Today rated the film 1.5/5, stating "Vijay's fantasy film tries hard to roar but ends up squeaking." Mid-Day rated the film 1.5/5, writing, "Not fair to compare, maybe, but one cannot help it. 'Puli', at best, looks like the poor, underfed cousin of 'Bahubali', the other fantasy film that we were treated to not so long ago. The setting is almost the same. Kings, queens, waterfalls and forests and a newborn child being found in the ocean, but Puli proves that director Chimbu Deven doesn't even remotely share the grand vision of SS Rajamouli's." Gautaman Bhaskaran of Hindustan Times gave the film 1/5 stars saying, "Chimbu Deven could have thought of something better than this juvenile romp into fantasy land."

Both Baradwaj Rangan of The Hindu and S Saraswathi of Rediff.com gave negative reviews. Both critics also stated that several dialogues of Vijay were meant as declarations of political intent. Rangan wrote, "Put differently, Chimbu Deven has forgotten to make a movie for adults." Comparing Puli with Baahubali, another historical fiction film, he said that there was "a sustained commitment to storytelling" in the latter, which was missing in Puli. IBNLive rated the film 1/5, writing "If adventure is your genre, and Sridevi your fantasy, I'll wholeheartedly recommend K. Raghavendra Rao's 'Jagadeka Veerudu Athiloka Sundari' in which Sridevi is joined by Chiranjeevi on a whirlwind tour of fantasy, games, childish humor, action, and terrific music by Ilaiyaraaja. Coming to Puli, it's clearly a case of a misguided shot." DNA India regarded that the film's weaponry, armour, costumes and fighting skills were inspired from Game of Thrones, whereas Vijay and Sudeep's characterisations had resemblances to Jon Snow and Stannis Baratheon. Samina Motlekar compared the scene where Marudheeran fights and proves that he is a Vedhalam to a similar scene in Gladiator (2000), which was confirmed by producer Shibu Thameens to be an inspiration for the film.

The film attracted fandom among the younger audience. Baradwaj Rangan of The Hindu writes, "Put differently, Chimbu Deven has forgotten to make a movie for adults. His inventions surprise us, delight us for a second or two – and then we’re back to the turgid story."
