= Pitha 23:23 =

Indian crime thriller film

- Theatrical release poster
- Directed by: S.Sugan Kumar
- Written by: Babaa Kennady
- Produced by: G. Sivaraj
- Starring: Adesh Bala; Anu Krishna
- Cinematography: Ma.Ilayaraja
- Edited by: Sri Watsan
- Music by: Naresh
- Distributed by: Action Reaction Jenish
- Release date: 26 July 2024
- Country: India
- Language: Tamil

Pitha 23:23 is a 2024 Indian Tamil-language crime thriller film directed by S. Sugan Kumar. The film stars Adesh Bala and Anu Krishna.

== Cast ==
- Adesh Bala
- Anu Krishna
- Chaams
- Sri Ram Chandarasekar
- Arulmani
- Sams Rihanna
- Master Dharshith
- Mariss Raja
- Siva Vaanji

== Reception ==
Maalai Malar critic wrote that "It is amazing that this film was shot in 23 hours and 23 minutes" and rated that two out of five stars

Dinakaran critic noted that "This film, which was shot in 23 hours and 23 minutes, shows how much work the cinematographer would have done in many places such as festival scenes and kidnapping incidents. While the story online is interesting, more attention could have been paid to the screenplay. But commendable for the new effort."
