= Endrendrum =

2014 Indian film by Sinish Sreedharan

- Film poster
- Directed by: Sinish Sreedharan
- Written by: Sinish Sreedharan
- Produced by: Sinish Sreedharan
- Starring: Sathish Krishnan; Priyanka Reddy
- Edited by: T. S. Suresh
- Music by: Dharan Kumar
- Release date: 7 March 2014
- Country: India
- Language: Tamil
- Budget: 1C
- Box office: 25L

Endrendrum (lit. 'Everlasting') is a 2014 Tamil film written, produced, and directed by Sinish Sreedharan. It started off as a short film, and over a period of time, it was developed in to a tele-feature film. The film stars Sathish Krishnan and Priyanka Reddy in the lead roles, and Sai Dheena, Theepetti Ganesan, Meera Krishnan, Misha Ghoshal, Bala Saravanan, and Yogi Babu in other roles. The music was composed by Dharan Kumar, and film was edited by Tirupattur Sathyanarayan Suresh. The film was released on 7 March 2014. This film plot is loosely based on Just Like Heaven .

== Cast ==
- Sathish Krishnan as Charles
- Priyanka Reddy as Diana
- Sai Dheena
- Theepetti Ganesan
- Meera Krishnan
- Misha Ghoshal
- Bala Saravanan
- Yogi Babu
- Som Shekar
- Rinson Simon
- Vijay Varma

== Soundtrack ==
Endrendrum

Soundtrack album by Dharan Kumar
- Released: 3 January 2014
- Recorded: 15 July 2013
- Genre: Feature film soundtrack
- Language: Tamil

Dharan Kumar chronology
Virattu (2013)	Endrendrum (2014)	Thagaraaru (2013)

Music for Endrendrum has been composed by Dharan Kumar. Audio was launched at 15 July 2013 at Sathyam Cinemas. Director-producer Gautham Vasudev Menon and Studio Green's K. E. Gnanavel Raja. attended the event. Behindwoods wrote:": Nothing new to offer, but Endrendrum is a pleasant listening experience".

- "Endrendrum" - Nikhil Mathew
- "Kanne Kanne" - Ranina Reddy
- "Kanneere" - Dharan Kumar
- "Thoda Thoda" - Haricharan, Ranina Reddy
