= Thalakonam =

Indian Tamil-language romantic action drama film

- Directed by: K. Padmaraj
- Written by: K. Padmaraj
- Produced by: Thirumalaisivam
- Starring: Jithesh; Riya Nakshatra
- Cinematography: V. A. Ramalingam
- Edited by: R. V. Saravanan; K. Shankar
- Music by: Subash Jawahar
- Production company: SJS International
- Release date: 26 September 2014
- Country: India
- Language: Tamil

Thalakonam (transl. Talakona/Plane angle) is a 2014 Indian Tamil-language romantic action drama film directed by K. Padmaraj and starring Jithesh and Riya Nakshatra with Kota Srinivasa Rao, Firose Khan, and C. M. Bala in supporting roles.

== Cast ==
- Jithesh
- Riya Nakshatra as Divya
- Kota Srinivasa Rao as Minister Sethupathy
- Vaagai Sooda Vaa Nambiraj
- Ganja Karuppu
- Siva Narayana Murthy
- Kadhal Arun Kumar
- Telephone Raj
- Rekkha Sri
- Karakattakkaran Shanmugasundaram as Sethupathy's close aide
- G. R. Vijaysukumaran
- Firose Khan as ACP
- Super Sridhar
- G. K. Shankar
- Dindigul Meyyappan
- Tambaram Viji
- Pandu as the tour guide
- C. M. Bala as Zinda
- Babu
- Abhinayashree (special appearance in the song "Nirambi Vazhiyum")
- Nagina (special appearance in the song "Soun Soun Pappara Muttai")
- Alisha Khan (special appearance in the song "Soun Soun Pappara Muttai")
- Mippusamy in an uncredited role

== Production ==
Chikki Mukki (2013)-fame Jithesh plays one of the lead roles. The film was shot for around 45 days in the Talakona (called Thalakonam in Tamil) forest with the cast and crew staying in a guest house. Monkeys had disrupted the film shoot while the crew was on a lunch break and whenever snakes were present at the shooting spot, it had to be abandoned.

== Soundtrack ==
The music was composed by the duo Subash and Jawahar.

- "Maayava Maayava"
- "Kadhale Unnaku"
- "Otha Panaiya"
- "Nirambi Vazhiyum"
- "Soun Soun Pappara Muttai"

== Release and reception ==
The film was scheduled to release in 2012, but was delayed to 26 September 2014 alongside Jeeva and Madras.

Malini Mannath of The New Indian Express wrote, "Thalakonam is a debutant maker’s work gone awry". A critic from Dinamalar called the film fully crooked. A critic from iFlicks wrote, "Though the storyline is good, director K. Padmaraj has spoiled it with too many twists and turns".
