= Vendru Varuvaan =

Indian Tamil-language action drama film

- Theatrical release poster
- Directed by: Vijendran
- Written by: Vijendran
- Starring: Veera Bharati; Sameera
- Cinematography: Jayachandran
- Edited by: R. S. Sathishkumar
- Music by: Songs: Murali Krishnan; Score: Gopal
- Production company: Reality Pictures
- Release date: 26 August 2016
- Country: India
- Language: Tamil

Vendru Varuvaan (transl. He will win and come) is a 2016 Indian Tamil-language action drama film written and directed by Vijendran and starring Veera Bharati and Sameera.

== Cast ==
- Veera Bharati as Varman
- Sameera as Senbagam
- Vaiyapuri
- Nellai Siva as tea master
- Raja Rani Pandian as the landlord
- Crane Manohar
- Elizabeth as Varman's mother

== Soundtrack ==
The songs were composed by Murali Krishnan. Lyrics by P. Nikaran and Muthuveera.

- "Suthum Bhoomi" - Amali
- "Chinna Chitirame" - Sandhya, Lakshmi
- "Yeno Yeno" - Prasanna, Janaki Iyer
- "Manjal Kungumam" - Amali
- "Aaraaro Aaraaro" - Amali

== Reception ==
Malini Mannath of The New Indian Express wrote, "Apart from the glitches, Vendru Varuvaan could have done with more polish and style in its treatment. A promising work of a debutant maker, the film delivers much more than what one would have expected from a team of freshers". A critic from The Times of India Samayam rated the film 2/5 stars and called it watchable. A critic from iFlicks wrote, "Overall, Vendru Varuvaan will win the race in a slow pace".
