= Arimapatti Sakthivel =

- Official release poster
- Directed by: Ramesh Kandhasamy
- Written by: Pavan K
- Produced by: Ajish P; Pavan K
- Starring: Charle; Pavan K; Meghnaa Ellan; Imman Annachi
- Cinematography: J. P. Man
- Edited by: R. S. Sathish Kumar
- Music by: Mani Amuthavan
- Production company: Life Cycle Creations
- Release date: 8 March 2024
- Running time: 131 minutes
- Country: India
- Language: Tamil

Arimapatti Sakthivel is a 2024 Tamil-language drama film directed by Ramesh Kandhasamy and written by Pavan K. The film stars himself, Charle, Meghnaa Ellan and Imman Annachi in the lead roles. The film was produced by Pavan K and Ajish P, and the production is handled by Life Cycle Creations. The film was released on 8 March 2024 to negative reviews from critics.

== Cast ==
- Charle as Kuzhandhaivel
- K. Pavan as Sakthivel
- Meghnaa Ellan as Kavitha
- Imman Annachi
- Senthi Kumari
- Supergood Subramani
- Karate Venkatesan
- Hello Kandasamy

== Release ==
Arimapatti Sakthivel was theatrically released on 8 March 2024.

== Reception ==
Roopa Radhakrishnan from The Times of India rated the film 1 1/2 stars out of 5 stars and said "The performances of the Arimapatti Sakthivel cast are all right, with the exception of Pavan K. He is downright bad in his role."

Manigandan KR from Times Now rated the film two stars out of five stars and said "On the whole, Arimapatti Sakthivel is a film that could have been a lot better if enough attention had been paid to narrating the story well." Sreejith Mullappilly from Cinema Express rated the film 1 1/2 stars out of 5 stars and said "At some point in Arimapatti Sakthivel, Charle’s character tells his son to pursue his filmmaking and storytelling ambitions and give his love life a skip. As the film started to transition from a social drama into an actioner, I wished that Sakthivel had heeded his father's piece of advice."
