= Pa. Ra. Palanisamy =

- Directed by: M. Muthurathnam
- Written by: Suresh Devaraj
- Produced by: P. Thangavel
- Starring: Mugur Sundar; Ashwin; Srinivas Rao; Meenakshi Kailash
- Cinematography: Baskar; Ravi
- Edited by: K. M. Idris; M. Sankar
- Music by: Dhina
- Production company: Thangam Real Pictures
- Release date: 11 June 2010
- Running time: 110 minutes
- Country: India
- Language: Tamil

Pa. Ra. Palanisamy is a 2010 Tamil language thriller film directed by M. Muthurathnam. The film stars Mugur Sundar, Ashwin, Srinivas Rao and Meenakshi Kailash, with Alex, Karate Raja, Pandu, and Bala Subramani playing supporting roles. The film, produced by P. Thangavel, had musical score by Dhina and was released on 11 June 2010.

== Plot ==
The film begins with the old blind man Pa. Ra. Palanisamy (Mugur Sundar) and teenager Chinna (Ashwin) setting a car on fire with the deputy collector Muralidharan (Muralidharan) inside. The police inspector Johnson (Karate Raja) is assigned to unravel the mystery behind the death. Palanisamy and Chinna then murder the college correspondent Rajendran in his office and make the murder look a suicide, but the forensic report shows that it was a murder.

In the meantime, the press reporter Prabhakar (Srinivas Rao) falls in love with his newly appointed office colleague Maheshwari (Meenakshi Kailash). Later, Palanisamy poisons the drink of the wealthy man named Manohar in a bar. Prabhakar witnesses it, but Palanisamy and his aid escape from the place. With all of the evidence that he has collected, Johnson finds out that these three murders were committed by the same duo.

In the past, Palanisamy was a renowned scientist who got many awards for his achievements and strongly supported organic farming. One day, MLA Vaitheeswaran (Alex) and his four associates requested Palanisamy to sell his land to build an orphanage at that place, Palanisamy wholeheartedly accepted to sell it, but they cheated him and grabbed his land. Palanisamy had no other choice than to complain to the police. One night, Vaitheeswaran and his four associates broke into his house, killed his family, and left Palanisamy for dead. Palanisamy, who lost his sight, decided to take revenge on them with the help of the orphan teenager Chinna.

Back to the present, Palanisamy kills another person but is severely wounded during the fight and dies. Before dying, Chinna promises to him that he kill Vaitheeswaran, who is now a minister. Meanwhile, Prabhakar confesses to Johnson that he has seen the murderers. The film ends with Chinna kidnapping and killing Vaitheeswaran.

== Cast ==
- Mugur Sundar as Pa. Ra. Palanisamy
- Ashwin as Chinna
- Srinivas Rao as Prabhakar
- Meenakshi Kailash as Maheshwari
- Alex as Vaitheeswaran
- Karate Raja as Johnson
- Pandu
- Bala Subramani as Muralidharan
- Scissor Manohar as Nagarajan
- Muthukaalai as Head Constable Tsunami
- Nadesh as Police Constable
- Vijay Ganesh as Police Constable
- Baby Poojasree
- Nellai Siva
- Kovai Senthil
- Theni Murugan
- Ranjan
- Sheela
- Lakshmi
- Sujibala in a special appearance
- Prabhu Deva in a special appearance
- Raju Sundaram in a special appearance
- Venkatesh. P (Salem Vysya College Principal) as collector in a special appearance

== Production ==
Mugur Sundar, who has worked as a dance master in over 1000 films, made his debut as a lead actor with Pa. Ra. Palanisamy under Thangam Real Pictures banner. Srinivas Rao and Meenakshi Kailash were selected to play the lead role, Pandu, Alex and Karate Raja were also in the cast. Dhina is scoring the music while Suresh Devaraj has penned the story and screenplay besides wielding the megaphone. The film featured a peppy number with Mugur Sundar and his sons Prabhu Deva and Raju Sundaram dancing in a huge set and choreographed by dance master Sridhar.

== Soundtrack ==
Pa. Ra. Palanisamy

Soundtrack album by Dhina
- Released: 14 May 2010
- Recorded: 2010
- Genre: Feature film soundtrack
- Length: 24:46
- Producer: Dhina

Dhina chronology
Magane En Marumagane (2010)	Pa. Ra. Palanisamy (2010)	Thambi Arjuna (2010)

The film score and the soundtrack were composed by Dhina. The soundtrack, released on 14 May 2010, features 6 tracks with lyrics written by Suresh Devaraj.

Track	Song	Singer(s)	Duration
1	"Inter City"	Haricharan	4:34
2	"Malai Nera Suriyan"	S. P. Bhavan	1:43
3	"Nenjukkul Mariyal"	Benny Dayal, Priya Himesh	4:38
4	"Netru Athu Unakku"	Dhina	5:00
5	"Singarimava Singakutty"	Mukesh, Chinnaponnu	4:37
6	"Thedivandhaen"	Shankar Mahadevan, Malathy Lakshman, Priyadarshini	4:14
