= Veedu Manaivi Makkal =

1988 film directed by T. P. Gajendran

- Theatrical release poster
- Directed by: T. P. Gajendran
- Screenplay by: T. P. Gajendran
- Story by: T. Durairaj
- Produced by: N. Radha
- Starring: Visu; K. R. Vijaya; Pandiyan; Seetha
- Cinematography: Baby Philips
- Edited by: N. R. Kittu; Ganesh Kumar
- Music by: Shankar–Ganesh
- Production company: Sri Thenandal Films
- Release date: 15 January 1988
- Country: India
- Language: Tamil

Veedu Manaivi Makkal (transl. House, Wife, People) is a 1988 Indian Tamil-language drama film co-written and directed by T. P. Gajendran in his directorial debut. The film stars Visu, K. R. Vijaya, Pandiyan and Seetha. It was released on 15 January 1988, and was commercially successful. The film was remade in Kannada as Ganda Mane Makkalu (1988) by Gajendran himself, in Telugu as Illu Illalu Pillalu (1988) and in Malayalam as Kudumba Vishesham (1994).

== Plot ==
Subbaiah Pillai is the head of a middle-class family comprising his wife Lakshmi, two sons and two daughters – Seetha and Sulochana. They live in a rented property owned by a cruel landlord in Chennai with whom Subbaiah Pillai often gets into quarrel. Subbaiah Pillai challenges his landlord that he will build a new house in less than three months and vacate his current rented premises. Subbaiah Pillai finalises purchase of a plot in the outskirts of Chennai and decides to build a house there.

The elder son is a dancer and is married to his cousin, but he develops an illegitimate affair with his co-dancer and starts living together. Subbaiah Pillai and Lakshmi try hard to re-unite the elder son with his wife which they accomplish successfully after so much struggles. After re-uniting, the elder son's wife transforms and prefers to lead a nuclear family away from her in-laws for which the elder son agrees as well. Subbaiah Pillai and Lakshmi feel bad about the elder son and his wife's decision to leave them.

Sulochana falls in love with their neighbour, Sigamani. who has been employed in Dubai and had come to Chennai for holidays. Subbaiah Pillai learns of his daughter's love and agrees for their wedding. To Subbaiah Pillai's shock, Sigamani loses his job and starts staying along with Subbaiah Pillai and his family which makes Subbaiah Pillai angry and shouts at him once. Sigamani feels insulted and leaves the home along with his wife. Seetha falls in love with the henchman who is employed with the landlord but trying to get a good job. Subbaiah Pillai's younger son could not find a job and keeps trying repeatedly. Finally, the younger son gets a job in a company owned by Delhi Ganesh and falls in love with boss' daughter. The younger son also settles with his father-in-law.

Subbaiah Pillai accumulates some money and starts building the house, however he further needs some more financing. He decides to get the help from his children, but none of them come for rescue. Sulochana lies that she has already sold her gold necklace which was given by Subbaiah Pillai while the younger son demands a sign in a bond paper which shows his lack of trust on his parents.

Seetha is the only daughter who still stays will her parents. Lakshmi falls sick and passes away. Subbaiah Pillai decides to burn her body at the place where he has been building a house. Hearing the news of Lakshmi's death, their family members including the sons and Sulochana rush to see, however, Subbaiah Pillai denies permission to allow them having a look at Lakshmi's dead body. Finally, Seetha and the henchman are united.

== Cast ==
- Visu as Subbaiah Pillai
- K. R. Vijaya as Lakshmi
- Pandiyan as henchman
- Seetha
- Delhi Ganesh
- T. P. Gajendran
- S. Ve. Shekher as Sigamani
- Ganga as Subbaiah Pillai's younger son
- Anand Babu as Subbaiah Pillai's elder son
- Kuladeivam Rajagopal as Broker Bullet
- Pushpalatha as Jagadamba

== Production ==
Veedu Manaivi Makkal was the directorial debut of T. P. Gajendran, and was produced by N. Radha under M/S Thenandal Films. Gajendran wrote the screenplay based on a story by T. Durairaj. The story was written in a way that would suit Visu's image. Cinematography was handled by Baby Philips, and the editing jointly by N. R. Kittu and Ganesh Kumar. The final cut of the film was 4,117.32 metres (13,508.3 ft).

== Soundtrack ==
The soundtrack was composed by Shankar–Ganesh. The lyrics for all songs were written by Vairamuthu except one, which was written by Idhaya Chandran.

Track listing
No.	Title	Lyrics	Singer(s)	Length
1.	"Kaadhal Kaadhal"	Vairamuthu	K. J. Yesudas	3:13
2.	"Sengallai Thookara"	Idhaya Chandran	Malaysia Vasudevan, Uma Ramanan	3:15
3.	"Nam Veeduthan"	Vairamuthu	Mano	4:57
4.	"Veedu Manaivi Makkal"	Vairamuthu	S. P. Balasubrahmanyam	4:05
5.	"Thotathellam"	Vairamuthu	S. P. Balasubrahmanyam	4:00
Total length:				19:30

== Release and reception ==
Veedu Manaivi Makkal was released on 15 January 1988. The following week, N. Krishnaswamy of The Indian Express felt the film was too similar to the directorial films of Visu like Kudumbam Oru Kadambam, Manal Kayiru, Samsaram Adhu Minsaram and Thirumathi Oru Vegumathi, but praised the performance of K. R. Vijaya, who he said "steals the show". Jayamanmadhan of Kalki appreciated the film for its comedy, screenplay and performances but panned the cinematography and climax. The film was commercially successful.
