= Banda Paramasivam =

- DVD cover
- Directed by: T. P. Gajendran
- Written by: T. P. Gajendran; G. K. Gopinath (dialogues)
- Produced by: P. T. Selvakumar
- Starring: Prabhu; Kalabhavan Mani; Abbas; Rambha; Abhinayashree; Monica
- Cinematography: Rajarajan
- Edited by: Ganesh Kumar
- Music by: Sirpy
- Production company: Varshene Films
- Release date: 14 April 2003
- Running time: 155 minutes
- Country: India
- Language: Tamil

Banda Paramasivam is a 2003 Indian Tamil-language comedy film directed by T. P. Gajendran and produced by P. T. Selvakumar. The film stars Prabhu, Kalabhavan Mani, Abbas, Rambha, Abhinayashree, and Monica while Manivannan, Vinu Chakravarthy, P. Vasu, and Livingston, among others, play supporting roles. The music was composed by Sirpy, and editing was done by Ganesh Kumar. The film was released on 14 April 2003. It is a remake of the Malayalam film Mattupetti Machan (1998).

== Plot ==
Pandiyan (Manivannan) and Cheran (Vinu Chakravarthy) are stepbrothers who are constantly at loggerheads, and their daughters Manju (Ramba) and Anju (Abhinayasree) continue their enmity. They are always trying to prove to each other that one is better than the other and are always bickering. When Cheran sees his daughter's suitor Ravi (Livingston), who comes to see her in hopes of finding a future bride, Cheran insults Ravi for not having as much money as he did and questioned his mother if she had other husbands. Hearing this, Ravi's father suffers a heart attack. In anger, Ravi, wanting to make Cheran lose his properties and come to the streets, arranges to have a petty thief named Paramu (Prabhu) pose as a rich man and wriggle his way in as Pandiyan's son-in-law. Paramu and his friend Sivam (Kalabhavan Mani), who is also a thief, are always competing against each other to be better than the other and to become a millionaire before the other. This leads to a lot of comic rivalries, but Paramu mistakenly enters Pandiyan's house because the gate of Cheran's house had been recently been painted over. Manju begins falls for Paramu. Meanwhile, Sivam enters Cheran's house, posing as a cinema director. Madhavan (Abbas) helps them both since he is in love with a poor girl and is pretty sure that his father Chidambara Udayar (P. Vasu) will oppose his wedding. Paramu and Sivam make a deal with Madhavan that if he helps them become rich, then Paramu would adopt Shenbagam (Monica), the poor girl that Madhavan loves, so that they would be equal in prestige and stature. This way, Udayar would agree to their marriage. Paramu and Sivam pose as Udayar's sons. Things went worse when Paramu's father-in-law Pandiyan takes them to Madhavan's house.

The film revolves around how Paramu, Sivam, and Madavan deal with the situation and how everything comes to be known to both families and Madhavan's family forms the crux of the story.

== Cast ==
- Prabhu as Paramu
- Kalabhavan Mani as Sivam
- Abbas as Madhavan
- Rambha as Manju
- Abhinayasree as Anju
- Monica as Shenbagam
- Vinu Chakravarthy as Cheran
- Manivannan as Pandiyan
- P. Vasu as Chidambara Udayar, Madhavan's father
- Manobala as Police inspector
- Livingston as Ravi
- T. P. Gajendran as Vellaichamy
- Charle as Nokia
- Madhan Bob as Doctor
- Rajkrishna as Film hero
- T. K. Natarajan as Ravi's father
- Benjamin as Painter
- Adhavan as Guna, Shenbagam's brother
- C. R. Saraswathi as Sornam, Pandiyan's wife
- Babitha as Pushpa, Cheran's wife
- Jaya Murali as Madhavan's mother
- Vijaya Singh as Ravi's mother
- Neetu as Viji
- Priyanka as Film heroine
- P. T. Selvakumar as Shop owner
- Lekhasri in a special appearance

== Soundtrack ==
Soundtrack was composed by Sirpy and lyrics were written by Ra. Ravishankar.

Track listing
No.	Title	Singer(s)	Length
1.	"Panchumala"	Ranjith, Sujatha
2.	"Tajmahal"	P. Unnikrishnan, Sujatha
3.	"Mappillai"	Mano, Krishnaraj
4.	"Lelakkadi"	Krishnaraj, Anuradha Sriram
5.	"Aleka Aleka"	Mano, Krishnaraj

== Reception ==
Malini Mannath of Chennai Online wrote, "An assortment of characters brought together, leading to confusion and mix-ups, impersonations and one-upmanship. Some of the situations are enjoyable, a few tolerably funny, while others plainly sickening. All meant for a targetted audience, who've enjoyed the earlier so-called comedies of the Prabhu-Gajendran teaming". Malathi Rangarajan of The Hindu wrote, "It is sad that filmmakers assume that just about anything in the name of comedy would sell. Let alone laughter, most of the time it is not even possible to manage a sardonic grin". Sify wrote "Varshene Films Banda Paramasivam is another laugh riot from the Prabhu-T.P.Gajendran team. It is sad that most of the filmmakers feel that anything in the name of comedy can sell these days and they remake films from other languages. Banda Paramasivam is also a remake from a Malayalam comedy Mattupatti Machan". Visual Dasan of Kalki praised Gajendran for creating hilarious scenes and takes forward the scenes inevitably while praising the acting of Prabhu. Mani and Vasu and Sirpy's music and concluded saying such films made in lakhs with the aim of making people forget their worries and laugh are much more than junk films made in crores of money.
