= Nellai Siva =

Indian actor and comedian (1952–2021)

- Born: Sivanathan Shanmugavelan Ramamoorthy; 16 January 1952; Veppilankulam, Panagudi, Radhapuram, Tirunelveli, India
- Died: 11 May 2021 (aged 69)
- Occupations: Actor, comedian
- Years active: 1985 – 2021

Sivanathan Shanmugavelan Ramamoorthy (16 January 1952 – 11 May 2021), better known by his stage name Nellai Siva, was an Indian comedian and actor, who predominantly worked in Tamil cinema. He worked mostly in comedy scenes. His first film was Aan Paavam released in 1985. He appeared in popular movies like Mahaprabhu, Vetri Kodi Kattu, Kannum Kannum. His way of speaking in the movies is completely of Nellai slang, which shows him unique to other supporting actors. He has acted in over 500 films in his career.

== Early life ==
Nellai Siva was born on 16 January 1952, in Veppilankulam, a small village in Nellai district. He was a fan of Sivaji Ganesan and came to Chennai to make a break in films. He met and became friends with Mansoor Ali Khan and Bonda Mani, who were also upcoming actors at the time. After struggling for over a decade, he met K. Bhagyaraj and participated in a few series on Chennai Television, gaining popularity, and whom he credits with "making him successful in cinema". He also started his film career by acting alongside then-famous actor Nagesh, who admired his Tirunelveli slang on set and encouraged him to use it as a defining factor in his comedy.

== Film career ==
In 1985, he debuted in the movie Aan Paavam directed by Pandiarajan. Later, he acted in minor roles. In the late 1990s, he started his career as a supporting comedian. He starred in the film Vetri Kodi Kattu as a tea shop owner. After this movie, he slowly progressed by acting in movies like Saamy, Anbe Sivam, Attagasam, Thirupaachi, Kireedam and much more. He also acted along with Vadivelu and Vivek in films during 2000s. He is notable for his comedian roles along with actor Vadivelu whose movies became very popular.

== Television career ==
In 2018-2021, he acted in Tamil television serials in Vijay TV such as Pandiyan Stores. His role as 'Kumaresan Mama' in Pandian Stores was a notable one. He was also a part of Mama Mapillai. On the 11 May 2021, he died in Chennai due to a heart attack.

== Partial filmography ==
Partial list of film credits
Year	Title	Role	Notes
1985	Aan Paavam	Villager	
1993	Rajadhi Raja Raja Kulothunga Raja; Marthanda Raja Gambeera Kathavaraya; Krishna Kamarajan		
1994	En Aasai Machan		
1994	Seevalaperi Pandi		
1994	Ravanan	Punnakku	
1995	Gandhi Pirantha Mann		
1995	Sindhu Bath		
1996	Mahaprabhu	Local politician	
1996	Aruva Velu	Police officer	
1996	Aavathum Pennale Azhivathum Pennale	Sandana Karuppan	
1996	Tata Birla	Police head constable	
1996	Vaazhga Jananayagam		
1998	Kannathal		
1999	Unnai Thedi		
1999	Suyamvaram	hostler	
1999	Unnaruge Naan Irundhal		
1999	Aasaiyil Oru Kaditham		
2000	Thirunelveli	Manickam	
2000	Kannan Varuvaan		
2000	Vetri Kodi Kattu	Tea shop owner	
2000	Unnai Kann Theduthey		
2001	Rishi	Car cleaner	
2002	Red	Madurai resident	
2002	H2O	Chennoor villager	Kannada film; uncredited
2002	Thamizhan	Train ticket collector	Uncredited role
2002	Ivan	Slum dweller	
2002	Run	Politician	
2003	Anbe Sivam		
2003	Saamy	Perumal Pichai's supporter	
2003	Inidhu Inidhu Kadhal Inidhu		
2003	Thithikudhe		
2003	Winner	Astrologer	
2003	Anjaneya		
2003	Thirumalai	Thirumalai's friend	
2003	Sindhamal Sitharamal		
2004	Madhurey		
2004	Attagasam	Samuthirakani Henchmen	
2005	Thirupaachi	Villager	
2005	Anbe Aaruyire	Traffic Police Officer	
2005	Oru Naal Oru Kanavu		
2005	Padhavi Paduthum Paadu		
2005	Vetrivel Sakthivel		
2006	Parijatham		
2006	Imsai Arasan 23rd Pulikecei	Poet	
2006	Vattaram		
2006	Ilakkanam	House broker	
2007	Manikanda		
2007	Thirutham	Head constable	
2007	Oram Po	Annachi	
2007	Ennai Paar Yogam Varum	Head constable	
2007	En Uyirinum Melana		
2007	Kireedam	Auto driver	
2007	Nam Naadu	Political member	
2007	Puli Varudhu	Bus driver	
2008	Vambu Sandai		
2008	Chakkara Viyugam	Police officer	
2008	Silandhi		
2008	Malarinum Melliya		
2008	Arai En 305-il Kadavul	Tea shop owner	
2008	Sutta Pazham		
2008	Thithikkum Ilamai	Paranthaman	
2008	Iyakkam		
2008	Kannum Kannum	Sudalai	
2008	Maanavan Ninaithal	Courier office manager	
2008	Azhaipithazh		
2008	Madurai Ponnu Chennai Paiyan	Maths teacher	
2008	Velvi	Police constable	
2009	Padikkathavan	Kothandam	
2009	Thoranai		
2009	Kudiyarasu		
2009	Madhavi	Man on bike	
2009	Pinju Manasu	Annachi	
2009	Aiymbulan		
2009	Kanthaswamy	Police constable	
2009	Madurai To Theni		
2009	Mathiya Chennai		
2009	Vedappan	Annachi	
2010	Kadhai	Police inspector	Uncredited role
2010	Tamizh Padam	Minister	
2010	Ambasamudram Ambani	Head Constable	
2010	Theeradha Vilaiyattu Pillai	Roadside shop owner	
2010	Azhagaana Ponnuthan		
2010	Kattradhu Kalavu		
2010	Pa. Ra. Palanisamy		
2010	Pournami Nagam		
2010	Neeyum Naanum	Nellai	
2010	Mudhal Kadhal Mazhai		
2011	Siruthai	Doctor	
2011	Minsaram	Thooyavan	
2012	Vachathi		
2012	Kazhugu	Police Officer	
2012	Saguni	Policeman	
2013	Puthagam	Traffic police officer	
2013	Keeripulla	Police officer	
2013	Yaaruda Mahesh		
2013	Thirumathi Thamizh		
2013	Pattathu Yaanai	Constable	
2013	Naankam Thamizhan		
2013	Kolagalam		
2014	Tenaliraman	Maamannar's soldier	
2014	Sooran		
2014	Aindhaam Thalaimurai Sidha Vaidhiya Sigamani	Police inspector	
2014	Puthiyathor Ulagam Seivom	Ashwin's grandfather	
2014	Azhagiya Pandipuram		
2015	Nathikal Nanaivathillai		
2015	Vindhai		
2015	Eli		
2015	Papanasam		
2015	Thunai Mudhalvar		
2015	Savaale Samaali		
2015	Sakalakala Vallavan		
2015	Viraivil Isai		
2015	Kalai Vendhan		
2015	Thiruttu VCD	Traffic Police Inspector	
2016	Miruthan	Gurumoorthy's henchman	
2016	Bathiladi		
2016	Anbanavan Asaradhavan Adangadhavan		
2016	Jithan 2	Vijayakumar	
2016	Vendru Varuvaan	Tea master	
2016	Thagadu	Park officer	
2016	Ner Mugam		
2016	Yokkiyan Vaaran		
2017	Unnai Thottu Kolla Vaa		
2017	Virudhachalam		
2017	Aarambame Attagasam		
2017	Karanam		
2017	Namma Kadha		
2018	Solli Vidava	Traffic police officer	
2018	Abhiyum Anuvum	Traffic police officer	
2018	Padithavudan Kilithu Vidavum		
2018	Seemathurai	M. Muthukumar	
2019	Mudivilla Punnagai		
2019	Kazhugu 2	Head Constable	
2019	Udhay		
2019	Impathu Roova		
2019	Manguni Pandiyargal		
2019	Peai Vaala Pudicha Kathai		
2019	Arandavanukku Irundathellam Pei		
2020	En Sangathu Aala Adichavan Evanda		
2020	Pachai Vilakku		
2020	Sollunganne Sollunga		
2021	Pei Irukka Bayamen		
2021	Pazhagiya Naatkal		
2021	Paramapadham Vilayattu		
2021	Naruvi		
2023	Eppodhum Ava Nenaipu		Posthumous release
2023	Uruchidhai		Posthumous release
2023	Peikku Kalyanam		Posthumous release
2025	Madha Gaja Raja	Politician	Posthumous release
2025	Yaman Kattalai		Posthumous release
2025	Thangakottai		Posthumous release

Dubbing artist

- Giri (2004) - Sait
