= Veppilankulam =

- Village panchayat
- Nickname: Vembai
- Location in Tamil Nadu, India Veppilankulam (India)
- Coordinates: 8.29°N 77.62°E
- Country: India
- State: Tamil Nadu
- District: Tirunelveli
- Taluk: Radhapuram

Government
  - Body: President of Panchayat - V.V.Vel Murugan

Languages
  - Official: தமிழ் (Tamil)
- Time zone: UTC+5:30 (IST)
- Postal code: 627131
- Telephone code: 04637
- Vehicle registration: TN-72

Veppilankulam, also known as Vembai, is a village panchayat of Veppilankulam in Radhapuram taluk in Tirunelveli district in the Indian state of Tamilnadu.

== Geography ==
Veppilankulam is located at 8.29°N 77.62°E. By road it is 8 km east from Panagudi .

== Access ==
=== Rail ===
Railway Station : VALLIYUR (VLY) - 14.5 km, KANYAKUMARI (CAPE) - 30 km.

=== Air ===
Domestic Airport : TUTICORIN, Tamil Nadu - 90 km.

International Airport : TRIVANDRUM, Kerala - 103 km.

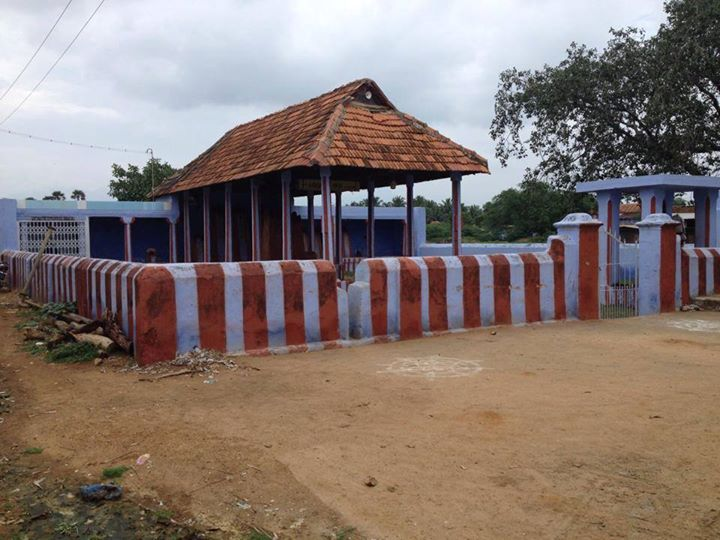
Ullamudaiyar sastha temple
