= T. P. Gajendran =

Indian film director and actor (1955–2023)

- டி. பி. கஜேந்திரன்
- Born: 1955
- Died: 5 February 2023 (aged 68)
- Occupations: Actor; director
- Years active: 1983–2023
- Children: 1

T. P. Gajendran (1955 – 5 February 2023) was an Indian film director and actor who played minor roles. He directed more than 15 films and acted in more than 100 films. He was the son of Tuticorin MR.Perumal. Actress T. P. Muthulakshmi, his sister-in-law, helped with his upbringing.

== Career ==
T.P. Gajendran worked as an assistant director to K. Balachander and Visu. He made his debut as an actor in the film Dowry Kalyanam (1983). In 1988, he made his directorial debut with the film Veedu Manaivi Makkal.

In the early 2000s, Gajendran directed a series of medium-budget family comedy drama films featuring Prabhu in titular lead roles. These include Budget Padmanabhan (2000), Middle Class Madhavan (2001), and Banda Paramasivam (2003), while a fourth film Aasai Vachen Unmele was shelved after a few schedules. He also attempted to make a Hindu devotional film, owing to the trend in Tamil cinema during 2001, but Karppoora Naayagi featuring Roja and Bhanupriya was later shelved.

In 2015, he was chosen as the president of Cinema Technicians Association (CTA).

== Death ==
Gajendran died on 5 February 2023, at age 68.

== Filmography ==
=== As director ===
Films

Year	Film	Notes
1988	Veedu Manaivi Makkal	
1988	Ganda Mane Makkalu	Kannada film; remake of Veedu Manaivi Makkal
1988	Enga Ooru Kavalkaran	
1989	Enga Ooru Mappillai	
1989	Paandi Nattu Thangam	
1989	Thaaya Thaarama	
1990	Nalla Kaalam Porandaachu	
1990	Pengal Veettin Kangal	
1993	Konjum Kili	
1995	Paattu Vaathiyar	
1997	Pasamulla Pandiyare	
2000	Budget Padmanabhan	
2001	Middle Class Madhavan	
2003	Banda Paramasivam	
2007	Cheena Thaana	Remake of Malayalam film CID Moosa
2010	Magane En Marumagane	

=== As actor ===
Year	Film	Role	Notes
1983	Dowry Kalyanam	Villager	Uncredited role
1985	Chidambara Rahasiyam	Advocate	
1985	Puthiya Sagaptham	Gajendran	
1985	Aval Sumangalithan	Fernandes	
1987	Kavalan Avan Kovalan	Panchayat board member	Uncredited role
1988	Veedu Manaivi Makkal	Press owner	
1992	Annan Ennada Thambi Ennada		
1994	Vaa Magale Vaa	Muthu	
1998	Priyamudan	Ravi	
1998	Guru Paarvai	Comic Inspector	
1999	Maya		
2000	Bharathi	Kuvalai	
2000	Budget Padmanabhan	Lawyer	
2001	Middle Class Madhavan	Cameo role	
2002	Pammal K. Sambandam	Director	
2002	Ivan	Minister	
2003	Chokka Thangam	C. R. Saraswathi's husband	
2003	Banda Paramasivam	Vellaichamy	
2003	Thirumalai	Gopal	
2003	Pithamagan	Director	
2004	Perazhagan	Gajendra	
2004	Maha Nadigan		
2004	Arivumani		
2004	Manmadhan	Village Landlord	
2004	Amma Appa Chellam	Kumar's father	
2004	Jaisurya		
2005	Devathaiyai Kanden	Parrot Astrologer	
2005	Chandramukhi	Ganesh Constructions Employee	
2005	Padhavi Paduthum Paadu		
2005	Kaatrullavarai	Director	
2005	Majaa	Doctor	
2005	Vetrivel Sakthivel	Marriage broker	
2006	Kovai Brothers	Doctor	
2006	Pachchak Kuthira	Advocate Varadharajan	
2006	Kusthi		
2006	Perarasu	Minister	
2006	Manathodu Mazhaikalam	Narayanan	
2007	Aalwar	Police constable	
2007	Adavadi		
2007	Cheena Thaana 001	Madman	
2007	Nam Naadu	Irulandi	
2008	Sandai	The man Kathiresan's cousin threatens to beat up	
2008	Kathavarayan		
2008	Kuselan	Ramesh	
2008	Surya	Himself	
2009	Villu	Marriage guest	
2009	Satrumun Kidaitha Thagaval		
2009	Thoranai	Apartment Secretary	
2009	Aadatha Aattamellam	Professor	
2010	Magane En Marumagane	Priest	
2010	Ambasamudram Ambani	Police Inspector	
2010	Pollachi Mappillai	Astrologer	
2010	Baana Kaathadi	Kumar's father	
2010	Chikku Bukku		
2011	Sattapadi Kutram	Jambulingam	
2011	Yuvan Yuvathi	Thangameena's father	
2011	Sadhurangam		
2011	Velayudham	Travelling Ticket Examiner	
2011	Vazhividu Kanney Vazhividu		
2012	Mattuthavani		
2012	Mayanginen Thayanginen		
2013	Onbadhule Guru	Durai Singam	
2013	Sutta Kadhai	Sudalai	
2013	Thee Kulikkum Pachai Maram		
2014	Ramanujan	Emberumal Chettiar	
2014	Pattaya Kelappanum Pandiya	Doctor	
2014	Jamaai		
2014	Kalkandu	Doctor	
2015	Thunai Mudhalvar		
2015	En Vazhi Thani Vazhi		
2015	India Pakistan	Judge	
2015	Kalai Vendhan		
2015	Maanga	Petthiah	
2016	Sowkarpettai		
2016	Pencil	Sudhanthiram	
2016	Adra Machan Visilu		
2016	Ilamai Oonjal		
2016	Pagiri		
2016	Kanaga Durga		
2016	Virumandikkum Sivanandikkum	Hotel owner	
2017	Kanavu Variyam		
2019	Oviyavai Vitta Yaru		
2022	Panni Kutty	Periya Karuppu	
2023	Ithu Kathaiyalla Nijam		Posthumous release
2024	Vaagai		Posthumous release
2025	Yaman Kattalai		Posthumous release

Television

- My Dear Bootham
- 2009–2012: Idhayam
