= Salangai Durai =

Indian film director

- Born: S. Duraisamy; Tamil Nadu, India
- Occupations: Film director, writer
- Years active: 1994–present

Salangai Durai is an Indian film director and producer, who has directed Tamil language films. He became known for the rural drama Kathavarayan (2008).

== Career ==
After working as a television director and a dialogue writer in the late 1990s and early 2000s, Salangai Durai made his directorial debut with Kathavarayan (2008) starring Karan, Vidisha and Vadivelu. The film opened to negative reviews, with a critic noting "debutant director Salangai Durai may not have made a dream debut but this start is not disappointing."

He then directed Kantharvan, a love story narrating the tale of a romance between a lorry driver and a college girl, starring Kathir - who had featured in a small role in Kathavarayan- and Honey Rose. The film was released in 2014.

In 2015, Dandupalyam Alajadi a Telugu version of his movie Kaathavarayan was released.

He then began his next work on a police procedural film titled EPCO 302 starring Kasthuri in the lead role, under his own production studio, South Indian Productions. The film was released in 2021. Despite a low-profile release, the film garnered critical acclaim.

In 2023, salangai durai directed a Tamil movie titled Kadathal. The Film stars Damodhar, Vidhisha, Riya, Singampuli, Ferosekhan. This movie was released on September 22, 2023.

== Filmography ==
=== Films ===
As director

| Year | Film | Notes |
|---|---|---|
| 2008 | Kathavarayan | |
| 2014 | Kandharvan | Also producer |
| 2021 | EPCO 302 | Also producer |
| 2023 | Kadathal | Also producer |

As dialogue writer

- Ayudha Poojai (1995)
- Sutha
- Suyamvaram (1999)
- Samrat Asoka (2001; Tamil dialogues)

As actor

- En Rajangam (1994) as a reporter
- Rettai Jadai Vayasu (1997) as a servant

=== Television ===
As director

- Veeran Maruthu Manickam (1998)
- Panchami (2000)
- Inai Kodugal
