= Yuvan (actor) =

Indian actor

- Born: Ajmal Khan; Chennai
- Occupation: Actor
- Years active: 2010-present
- Spouse: Rameeza Kahani (m. 2024)
- Parent: Firose Khan

Yuvan Firose Khan is an Indian actor, who has appeared in Tamil language films. The son of director Firose Khan, he made a breakthrough appearing in M. Anbazhagan's Saattai (2012).

== Career ==
The son of director Firose Khan, Yuvan was keen to work in films and made his debut as an actor with his father's Pasakkara Nanbargal at the age of 15, where he was credited as Ajmal Khan. The film had a low key release and received negative reviews from critics. Yuvan made a breakthrough as an actor by playing the lead role of a school student in Saattai (2012). The film opened to positive reviews, while a critic from The Hindu noted "Yuvan could work harder on his expressions". His subsequent films Keeripulla opposite Disha Pandey, Kadhalai Thavira Verondrum Illai with Saranya Mohan and Kamara Kattu, a horror film co-starring Sree Raam, fared less well at the box office and earned negative reviews. During the period, he also worked on Rasu Madhuravan's Sogusu Perundhu, but the film was shelved following the death of the director. Likewise, other ventures like Jacky and Kanthari were also shelved midst production.

In 2016, Yuvan worked on Ilami, a period movie set in the year 1700, where he portrayed a youngster who excels at jallikattu. For the role, he put on weight and trained with bulls for his scenes. Yuvan will next play the lead role in director Bala's next project opposite Pragathi Guruprasad; however, the project was later dropped.

== Filmography ==
Year	Film	Role	Notes
2011	Pasakkara Nanbargal	Arun Joseph	credited as Ajmal Khan
2012	Saattai	Pazhanimuthu	
2013	Keeripulla	Keeri	
2014	Kadhalai Thavira Verondrum Illai	Anbu	
2015	Kamara Kattu	Ramesh	
2016	Ilami	Karuppu	
2017	Ayyanar Veethi	Senthil	
2017	Vilayattu Aarambam	Yuvan	credited as Ajmal Khan
2019	Adutha Saattai	Pazhanimuthu	
