= Kathavarayan (2008 film) =

- Title card
- Directed by: Salangai Durai
- Written by: Salangai Durai
- Produced by: V. Ramachandran; R. Sadiq; S. Diwan
- Starring: Karan; Vidisha; Vadivelu
- Cinematography: A. Karthik Raja
- Edited by: Peter Babiya
- Music by: Srikanth Deva
- Production company: Silver Jubilee Films
- Release date: 30 May 2008
- Running time: 140 minutes
- Country: India
- Language: Tamil

Kathavarayan is a 2008 Indian Tamil language action drama film written and directed by Salangai Durai, starring Karan, Vidisha, and Vadivelu. The music was composed by Srikanth Deva with cinematography by A. Karthik Raja and editing by Peter Babiya. The film was released on 30 May 2008.

== Plot ==
Kathavarayan sells illicit arrack in Hogenakkal, Dharmapuri. Though he is involved in arrack trade, he is honourable. Malati, a student, arrives in the village as part of her NSS project. She vows to end the arrack menace in the village and takes efforts to arrest Kathavarayan. Thanks to her efforts, Kathavarayan is arrested and imprisoned in Chennai.

Malati's efforts to expose drug peddlers in Chennai backfires. The peddlers hatch a conspiracy, and Malati falls a prey to it. She is arrested for possessing drugs and is imprisoned. Kathavarayan leaves jail to retaliate against Malati, but he learns her real intentions and dire situation. He masterminds and joins the drug-peddling gang and eventually exposes them to save Malati.

== Cast ==
- Karan as Kathavarayan
- Vidisha Srivastava as Malati
- Vadivelu as 'Kandhuvetti' Karuppu
- Radha as Sarrosa
- Kadhal Dhandapani as Easwaran
- Ilavarasu as Police inspector
- Halwa Vasu
- Singamuthu
- Muthukaalai
- T. P. Gajendran
- Chaams
- Thalapathy Dinesh
- Kathir as a lorry driver

== Production ==
The film was initially offered to Sibiraj, though his refusal meant that Karan was chosen to play the lead role.

== Soundtrack ==
Soundtrack was composed by Srikanth Deva and lyrics were written by Snehan.

Song	Singers
"Aasaiye Alaipole"	Malathy, Srikanth Deva
"Kathavaraya"	Anuradha Sriram
"Kathavaraya Swamy"	Ramani Ammal, Karan
"Oru Haiku"	Tippu, Suchitra
"Oru Kaalai"	Kalyani
"Ponguppa Ponguppa"	Naveen Madhav, Saindhavi

== Critical reception ==
Sify wrote, "Karan's performance is loud and boorish, at times irritating with his Kovai Tamil. Radha definitely has a future as a glam girl while heroine Vidisha is earnest, but a poorly written role mars her chances. Ilavarasu, Kadhal Dhandapani are also there along with a sick comedy track of Vadivelu as an idiot moneylender who gets beaten up by all and sundry. There is nothing to hum about the music of Dheena". Malathi Rangarajan of The Hindu wrote, "Reactions that aren't not quite in tune with the flow of the story and a screenplay that doesn't exploit the initial tautness are the negative aspects of Kathavarayan. On the positive side is the sincere performance of Karan".

== Accolades ==
Vadivelu won the Tamil Nadu State Film Award for Best Comedian for the film.
