= List of Tamil films of 1988 =

Post-amendment to the Tamil Nadu Entertainments Tax Act 1939 on 1 April 1958, Gross jumped to 140 per cent of Nett Commercial Taxes Department disclosed ₹63 crore in entertainment tax revenue for the year.

The following is a list of films produced in the Tamil film industry in India in 1988, presented in alphabetical order.

Title	Director	Producer	Music	Cast
Adhu Antha Kaalam	Valampuri John	Bhanu Revathi Combines	Chandrabose	Sarath Babu, Lakshmi, Charan Raj, Rajeev
Agni Natchathiram	Mani Ratnam	Sujatha Productions	Ilaiyaraaja	Prabhu, Karthik, Amala, Nirosha, Vijayakumar, Jayachitra, Sumithra, V. K. Ramasamy, Janagaraj, Thara
Anbe En Anbe	K. Murali Raj	Yogalaya Productions	Udhayaraj	Anand, Madhuri
Annanagar Mudhal Theru	Balu Anand	Vivekanandha Film Circuit	Chandrabose	Sathyaraj, Ambika, Radha, Anand, Janagaraj, Manorama
Chutti Poonai		Lakshmi Raja Films	R. D. Burman	Baby Shalini
Dharmathin Thalaivan	S. P. Muthuraman	Dhandayuthapani Films	Ilaiyaraaja	Rajinikanth, Prabhu, Suhasini, Khushbu, V. K. Ramasamy, Charle
Dhayam Onnu	Selvakumar	V. N. S. Films	Ilaiyaraaja	Arjun, Seetha, Rekha, Nishanthi, Madhuri, Saranya, Pallavi, Senthil, V. K. Ramasamy, Manorama, S. S. Chandran
En Bommukutty Ammavukku	Fazil	Pavalar Creations	Ilaiyaraaja	Sathyaraj, Suhasini, Raghuvaran, Rekha, Geetu Mohandas
En Jeevan Paduthu	R. Sundarrajan	Panchu Associates	Ilaiyaraaja	Karthik, Saranya, Pratap K. Pothen, Kapil Dev, Sudha, Manorama, Kovai Sarala, Chinni Jayanth
En Thamizh En Makkal	Santhana Bharathi	Sivaji Productions	Gangai Amaran	Sivaji Ganesan, Vadivukkarasi, Pallavi, Nizhalgal Ravi, V. K. Ramasamy, S. S. Chandran, Chinni Jayanth
En Thangachi Padichava	P. Vasu	Sree Rajakaali Amman Enterprises	Gangai Amaran	Prabhu, Rupini, Chithra, Sudha
En Thangai Kalyani	T. Rajendar	Chimbu Cine Arts	T. Rajendar	T. Rajendar, Srividya, Vigdass, Sudha, S. S. Chandran, Vennira Aadai Moorthy, Renuka, Silambarasan
En Uyir Kannamma	Sivachandran	S. K. S. Film Creations	Ilaiyaraaja	Prabhu, Radha, Lakshmi, V. K. Ramasamy, S. S. Chandran
En Vazhi Thani Vazhi	V. Azhagappan	Rekha Movies	Chandrabose	Raghuvaran, Nishanthi, Geetha, S. S. Chandran
Enga Ooru Kavakkaran	T. P. Gajendran	Meenakshi Arts	Ilaiyaraaja	Ramarajan, Gouthami, S. S. Chandran, Senthil, Kovai Sarala, Y. Vijaya
Ennai Vittu Pogaathe	T. K. Bose	Shree Kanagadhara Art Films	Ilaiyaraaja	Ramarajan, Sabitha Anand, Radha Ravi, S. S. Chandran, Senthil
Ganam Courtar Avargale	Manivannan	Kamala Jothi Combines	Devendran	Sathyaraj, Ambika, Srividya, Janagaraj
Guru Sishyan	S. P. Muthuraman	P. A. Art Productions	Ilaiyaraaja	Rajinikanth, Prabhu, Gouthami, Seetha, Pandiyan, Cho, Manorama
Idhu Namma Aalu	Balakumaran	Bhagavathi Creations	K. Bhagyaraj	K. Bhagyaraj, Shobana, J. V. Somayajulu, Manorama, Kumarimuthu
Illam	I. V. Sasi	M. L. G. Creations	Ilaiyaraaja	Sivakumar, Amala, Chandrasekhar, Y. G. Mahendra
Irandil Ondru	V. Azhagappan	S. P. T. Films	Ilaiyaraaja	Ramki, Nadhiya, Madhuri
Ithu Engal Neethi	S. A. Chandrasekhar	Lalithanjali Fine Arts	Ilaiyaraaja	Ramki, Radhika, Nizhalgal Ravi, Vani Viswanath, Raja, S. S. Chandran
Ithuthan Arambam	Raj Barath	Pakshiraja Arts	Shankar–Ganesh	Pratap K. Pothen
Jadikketha Moodi	Umesh-Prabhakar	Sri Devi Kala Chithra	Hamsalekha	Pandiarajan, Pandiyan, Abhinaya, S. S. Chandran, Kovai Sarala
Jeeva	Pratap K. Pothen	Sathya Jyothi Films	Gangai Amaran	Sathyaraj, Amala, Nizhalgal Ravi, Janagaraj, Silk Smitha
Kaalaiyum Neeye Maalaiyum Neeye	R. Sundarrajan	Poornachandra Arts	Devendran	Vijayakanth, Prabhu, Lakshmi, Radhika, Rekha, Senthil
Kadarkarai Thaagam	Ilango	J. J. Enterprises	Chandrabose	Anand Babu, Lakshmi, Vaishnavi, Nizhalgal Ravi, S. S. Chandran
Kai Koduppal Karpagambal	S. Jagadeesan	Oaam Selvi Arts	Shankar–Ganesh	K. R. Vijaya, Seetha, Rajeev
Kai Naattu	V. C. Guhanathan	Suresh Productions	Chandrabose	Raghuvaran, Nishanthi, Madhuri, Senthil, Sudhakar, Aruna
Kalicharan	L. Raja	Murali Cine Arts	Chandrabose	Karthik, Sripriya, Gouthami, Madhuri, Charan Raj, S. S. Chandran
Kaliyugam	K. Subash	Anandhi Films	Chandrabose	Prabhu, Raghuvaran, Amala, Geetha, Janagaraj
Kalloori Kanavugal	P. J. Mohan	Nava Kavitha Creations		Kapil Dev, Viji
Kan Simittum Neram	Kalaivanan Kannadasan	Varalaxmi Creations	V. S. Narasimhan	Karthik, Ambika, R. Sarathkumar, S. S. Chandran, Senthil
Katha Nayagan	Muktha Srinivasan	Muktha films	Chandrabose	Pandiarajan, S. Ve. Shekher, Rekha, Shobana, S. S. Chandran, Manorama
Kazhugumalai Kallan	Rajasekhar	Sri Karpaga Vinayaga Film Circuit	Chandrabose	Charan Raj, Rekha, Disco Shanti
Kodi Parakkuthu	Bharathiraja	Manoj creations	Hamsalekha	Rajinikanth, Amala, Sujatha, Janagaraj
Koil Mani Osai	Gangai Amaran	National Movie Makers	Gangai Amaran	Raghuvaran, Pandiyan, Abhinaya, Senthil
Kunguma Kodu	V. Azhagappan	Mahesh Productions	S. A. Rajkumar	Mohan, Suresh, Nalini, Ramya Krishnan, Senthil
Maduraikara Thambi	R. T. Annadurai	Anand & Anand Associates	Shankar–Ganesh	Ramki, Sri Bharathi, Vijayakumar, Sudhakar, Renuka
Makkal Aaniyittaal	Rama Narayanan	Sri Thenandal Films	S. A. Rajkumar	Vijayakanth, Rekha, M. K. Stalin
Manaivi Oru Mandhiri	Rama Narayanan	Shenbagam Movies	Shankar–Ganesh	Ramki, S. Ve. Shekher, Seetha, S. S. Chandran, Senthil, Vennira Aadai Moorthy, Madhuri, Kovai Sarala, Lalitha Kumari
Manamagale Vaa	Panchu Arunachalam	Rajaa Enterprises	Ilaiyaraaja	Prabhu, Radhika, Goundamani, V. K. Ramasamy, S. S. Chandran, Kovai Sarala, Disco Shanti
Manasukkul Mathappu	Robert–Rajasekar	Ownland Arts	S. A. Rajkumar	Prabhu, Saranya, Lizy, Sarath Babu, Janagaraj, Sachu
Mappillai Sir	D. S. Balagan	Lakshmi Raja Films	Shankar–Ganesh	Mohan, Visu, Rekha, Jayanthi, Kismu, Sumithra
Melam Kottu Thali Kattu	Deenadayal	Sri Devi Bagavathy Films	Premasiri Khemadasa	Ramarajan, Pandiyan, Saranya, Lalitha Kumari, S. S. Chandran, Kovai Sarala, Chinni Jayanth
Muthal Paavam	P. Chandrakumar	Super Film International	Usha Khanna-Jerry Amaldev	Vimal Raj, Abhilasha
Naan Sonnathey Sattam	Rameshraj	Sri Mathralaya Chithralaya	Ilaiyaraaja	Charan Raj, Rekha
Nallavan	S. P. Muthuraman	Kalaippuli International	Chandrabose	Vijayakanth, Radhika, M. N. Nambiar, S. S. Chandran, Janagaraj, Vani Viswanath, Disco Shanti
Namma Ooru Nayagan	Yaar Kannan	Olympic Cinemas	Rajesh Khanna	Ramarajan, Gouthami, K. R. Vijaya, Sripriya, Senthil, Kovai Sarala
Neruppu Nila	Rama Narayanan	S. R. Combines	Shankar–Ganesh	Raja, Ranjini, Viji, S. S. Chandran
Nethiyadi	Pandiarajan	Avinash Arts	Pandiarajan	Pandiarajan, Vaishnavi, Janagaraj, Senthil, Kuyili
Oomai Kuyil	M. R. Yogaraj	Indralaya Films	Chandrabose	M. R. Yogaraj, Ilavarasi, Devi Bala
Oomai Thurai	K. G. Rajasekharan	Surya Pictures		
Oorai Therinjikitten	Kalaippuli G. Sekaran	Cineco Films	Gangai Amaran	Pandiarajan, Pallavi, Jaishankar, Senthil
Oruvar Vaazhum Aalayam	Shanmugapriyan	Royal Cine Creations	Ilaiyaraaja	Sivakumar, Prabhu, Rahman, Raadhu, Senthil
Paadatha Thenikkal	V. M. C. Haneefa	Poompuhar Productions	Ilaiyaraaja	Sivakumar, Radhika, Baby Sujitha
Paarthal Pasu	K. S. Gopalakrishnan	C. R. Production	Ilaiyaraaja	Ramarajan, Chandrasekhar, Pallavi, Sri Bharathi, Dharani, S. S. Chandran, Senthil
Paasa Paravaigal	V. M. C. Haneefa	Poompuhar Productions	Ilaiyaraaja	Sivakumar, Mohan, Lakshmi, Radhika, S. S. Chandran
Paatti Sollai Thattathe	Rajasekhar	AVM Productions	Chandrabose	Pandiarajan, Urvashi, Manorama, S. S. Chandran, Silk Smitha, Disco Shanti
Paimara Kappal	K. Radha	Nirmala Aajaa Creations	K. V. Mahadevan	S. S. R. Rajendrakumar, Pallavi, Janagaraj, Kalaiselvi, Chandrasekhar
Palaivanathil Pattamoppchi	Durai	Sunitha Cine Arts		Chandrasekhar, Senthil
Paravaigal Palavitham	Robert–Rajasekar	Esskay Film Combines	S. A. Rajkumar	Ramki, Nirosha, Janagaraj, Thara
Paris Paris	Rajan	Cowjoy Enterprises	T. K. Jayaraman	Senthil, V. K. Ramasamy
Pattikaatu Thambi	Senthilnathan	Anbalaya Films	Chandrabose	Arjun, Nirosha, Chandrasekhar, Sabitha Anand, Senthil
Penmani Aval Kanmani	Visu	Kavithalayaa Productions	Shankar–Ganesh	Visu, Pratap K. Pothen, Seetha, Kismu, Dhilip, Ilavarasan, Ramesh Aravind, Madhuri, Aruna, Manorama, Vadivukkarasi, Kamala Kamesh
Poo Pootha Nandhavanam	B. V. Balaguru	Sri Amman Creation	Shankar–Ganesh	Shridhar, Saritha, Goundamani
Poonthotta Kaavalkaaran	Senthilnathan	Tamil Annai Cine Creations	Ilaiyaraaja	Vijayakanth, Radhika, Anand, Vani Viswanath, S. S. Chandran
Poovizhi Raja	Santhana Bharathi	S. M. Art Films	Yuvaraj	Prabhu, Ramki, Nishanthi, Senthil, Chinni Jayanth
Poovukkul Boogambam	D. R. Thyagarajan	Lakshmi Shanthi Movies	Sangeetha Rajan	Thiagarajan, Parvathi, Charan Raj
Poovum Puyalum	S. A. Chandrasekhar	Semba Movies	S. A. Rajkumar	Sivakumar, Charan Raj, Radhika, Madhuri, Senthil
Puthiya Vaanam	R. V. Udayakumar	Sathya Movies	Hamsalekha	Sivaji Ganesan, Sathyaraj, Rupini, Gouthami, Janagaraj, Kuyili, Disco Shanti
Raasave Unnai Nambi	K. J. Bose	Red Sun Art Creations	Ilaiyaraaja	Ramarajan, Rekha, Saritha, Radha Ravi
Raththa Dhanam	Sivachandran	Kavitha Chitra Films	Gangai Amaran	Prabhu, Lakshmi, Gouthami, Chandrasekhar, Pratap K. Pothen, Sadhana, Nizhalgal Ravi, S. S. Chandran, Y. Vijaya, Disco Shanti
Rayilukku Neramachu	Bharathi Mohan	Shri Shanthalaya Productions	S. A. Rajkumar	Ramarajan, Nishanthi, Pandiyan, Madhuri, S. S. Chandran, V. K. Ramasamy, Manorama
Rendum Rendum Anju	Jayabharathi	Dhanalakshmi Movie Makers	Gangai Amaran	Sarath Babu, Ambika, Chandrasekhar, Senthil
Sahadevan Mahadevan	Rama Narayanan	Sri Thenandal Films	Shankar–Ganesh	Mohan, S. Ve. Shekher, Pallavi, Madhuri, S. S. Chandran, Kovai Sarala
Sakkarai Panthal	Gangai Amaran	Meenakshi Arts	Ilaiyaraaja	Charan Raj, Nishanthi, Chandrasekhar, Goundamani, Senthil, Kovai Sarala
Sathyaa	Suresh Krissna	Raaj Kamal Films International	Ilaiyaraaja	Kamal Haasan, Amala, Rajesh, Janagaraj, Anand
Senthoora Poove	P. R. Devaraj	Tamil Ponni Art	Manoj–Gyan	Vijayakanth, Ramki, Nirosha, Chandrasekhar, Senthil
Shenbagamae Shenbagamae	Gangai Amaran	Sri Lakshmana Films	Ilaiyaraaja	Ramarajan, Rekha, Silk Smitha, Chandrasekhar, Senthil, S. S. Chandran, Kovai Sarala
Sigappu Thali	R.Thyagarajan	Lakshmi Raja Films	Shankar–Ganesh	Charan Raj, Ramki, Nishanthi, Saranya, S. S. Chandran
Solla Thudikuthu Manasu	B. Lenin	Maruthi Movie Arts	Ilaiyaraaja	Karthik, Priyasri, Radha Ravi, Vennira Aadai Moorthy, Charle
Soora Samhaaram	Chitra Lakshmanan	Gayathri Films	Ilaiyaraaja	Kamal Haasan, Nirosha, Madhuri, Nizhalgal Ravi, Pallavi, Janagaraj
Sudhanthira Naattin Adimaigal	S. A. Chandrasekhar	Kathambari Creations	M. S. Viswanathan	Charan Raj, Radhika, Nizhalgal Ravi
Thaai Paasam	R. Krishnamoorthy	Rathna Movies	Shankar–Ganesh	Arjun, Rupini, Srividya, Jaishankar, S. S. Chandran
Thaimel Aanai	L. Raja	AVM Productions	Chandrabose	Arjun, Raghuvaran, B. Saroja Devi, Ranjini, Madhuri, Vani Viswanath, Kismu, S. S. Chandran, Senthil
Thambi Thanga Kambi	K. Shankar	Sankaralaya Pictures	Gangai Amaran	Vijayakanth, Lakshmi, Rekha, Ramya Krishnan, Manorama, Senthil, Kovai Sarala
Thanga Kalasam	London Gopal	Sudha Screen	M. S. Viswanathan	Pandian, Sudha Chandran, S. Ve. Shekher, Sri Jaya, Manorama, Senthil, Y. Vijaya
Thappu Kanakku	Jeeva Balan	Balan Pictures	M. S. Viswanathan	Charan Raj, Madhuri, Chandrasekhar, Asha Rani
Thenpandi Seemayile	C. P. Kollappan	Uzhaippalar Films	K. Bhagyaraj	Vijayakanth, Radhika, Chandrasekhar, Pandian, Seetha, Madhuri, S. S. Chandran, Kovai Sarala, Baby Sujitha
Therkathi Kallan	P. Kalaimani	Everest Films	Ilaiyaraaja	Vijayakanth, Radhika, Sulakshana, Madhuri, V. K. Ramasamy, S. S. Chandran, Janagaraj
Ullathil Nalla Ullam	Manivannan	Ajantha Creations	Gangai Amaran	Vijayakanth, Radha, Radha Ravi, Madhuri, Janagaraj, Senthil, Kamala Kamesh, Disco Shanti
Unnal Mudiyum Thambi	K. Balachander	Kavithalayaa Productions	Ilaiyaraaja	Kamal Haasan, Gemini Ganesan, Seetha, Manorama, Janagaraj
Urimai Geetham	R. V. Udayakumar	Sivasri Pictures	Manoj–Gyan	Prabhu, Karthik, Pallavi, Ranjini, Janagaraj
Uzhaithu Vaazha Vendum	Ameerjan	Motherland Pictures	Devendran	Vijayakanth, Radhika, Vidhyashree, Radha Ravi, S. S. Chandran, Senthil
Vacha Kuri Thappathu	M. R. Vijaychander	S. P. Pushparaj	Shankar–Ganesh	Chandrasekhar, Ramya Krishnan
Valaikaapu	A. Jayaraman	Kavitha Chitra Combines	Shankar–Ganesh	Sathyan, Jeevitha, Senthil
Vasanthi	Chitralaya Gopu	AVM Productions	Chandrabose	Mohan, Madhuri, Devi Lalitha, Manorama, S. S. Chandran
Veedu	Balu Mahendra	Sri Kala International	Ilaiyaraaja	Archana, Bhanu Chander, Chokkalinga Bhagavathar
Veedu Manaivi Makkal	T. P. Gajendran	Sri Thenandal Films	Shankar–Ganesh	Visu, K. R. Vijaya, S. Ve. Shekher, Seetha, Anand Babu, Ganga, Lalitha Kumari
