= S. P. Sailaja =

Indian singer (born 1962)

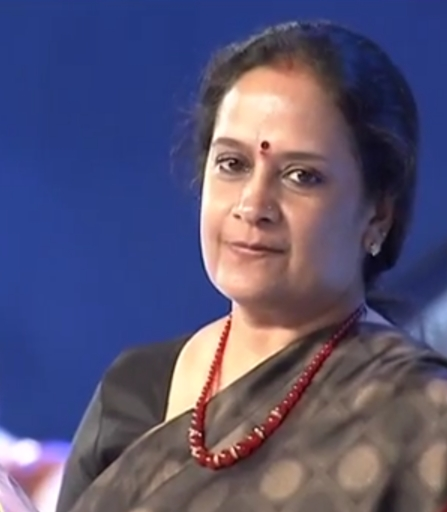
- Sailaja in Swarabhishekam
- Born: Sripathi Panditaradhyula Sailaja; 9 October 1962 (age 64); Nellore, Nellore district, Andhra Pradesh, India
- Occupations: Singer; actress; voice artist
- Years active: 1977–present
- Spouse: Subhalekha Sudhakar
- Children: 1
- Relatives: S. P. Balasubrahmanyam (brother)

Sripathi Panditaradhyula Sailaja is an Indian singer, voice artist and actress who had sung 5,000 songs in Tamil, Telugu, Kannada, Malayalam and Hindi films. She had sung most of the songs for Illayaraja, K. Chakravarthy, Ramesh Naidu, K.V. Mahadevan, Chandrabose, Shankar-Ganesh and Gangai Amaran. She had won two Nandi Awards, Filmfare South and Kalasagar awards.

== Television works ==
Sailaja has appeared as both an audition judge and a guest judge in several reality talent hunt shows such as Vijay TV's Airtel Super Singer, Airtel Super Singer Junior.

== Filmography ==
=== Actress ===
Year	Title	Role	Language
1983	Saagara Sangamam	Kum. Sailaja	Telugu

== Playback singing ==
=== Partial list of S. P. Sailaja songs ===
Year	Title	Song	Co-singer	Composer	Language
1977	Marpu	Iddaram Memu Iddaram	S.P.Vasantha	K. Chakravarthy	Telugu
1978	Surya Chandrulu	Edo Edo Entho Cheppalani	S. P. Balasubrahmanyam	Ramesh Naidu	Telugu
1978	Pranam Khareedu	Eilliyallo Eilliyallo Endhaka	G. Anand	K. Chakravarthy	Telugu
1978	Sivaranjani	Maa Palle Vadalaku Krishnamurthy	S. P. Balasubrahmanyam	Ramesh Naidu	Telugu
1978	Mana Voori Pandavulu	Nalla Nallani Mobbulona	G. Anand	K.V. Mahadevan	Telugu
1978	Manitharil Ithanai Nirangalah!	Mazhai Tharumo En Megam	S. P. Balasubrahmaniyam	Shyam	Tamil
1979	Dharma Yuddham	Are Povayya Povayya	-	Illayaraja	Telugu
1979	Hema Hemeelu	Red Lion Red Lion	S. P. Balasubrahmanyam	Ramesh Naidu	Telugu
1979	Uravasi Neeve Naa Preyasi	Vayasu Entha Vayasu	S. P. Balasubrahmanyam, Vani Jayaram, G. Anand	Illayaraja	Telugu
1979	Toorpu Velle Railu	Vasathade Naa Raju		S. P. Balasubrahmanyam	Telugu
1979	Kothala Raayudu	Yenda Vaana Pellade	S. P. Balasubrahmanyam	J. V. Raghavulu	Telugu
1979	Amma Evarikaina Amma	Chinnamama Chittimama		Illayaraja	Telugu
1979	Sri Vinayaka Vijayamu	Vandheloka Hitam		S. Rajeshwara Rao	Telugu
1979	Sri Vinayaka Vijayamu	Okka Vanka	Madhavapeddi Ramesh	S. Rajeshwara Rao	Telugu
1979	Sri Vinayaka Vijayamu	Sriman Maha Devadeva	Madhavapeddi Ramesh	S. Rajeshwara Rao	Telugu
1979	Sri Vinayaka Vijayamu	Vedha Vedhantha Rupaya	S. Rajeshwara Rao	S. Rajeshwara Rao	Telugu
1979	Maavari Manchitanam	Amma Donga	S. P. Balasubrahmanyam	Master Venu	Telugu
1979	Patagadu	Vandhanam Vandhanam	S. P. Balasubrahmanyam, Madhavapeddi Ramesh	Shankar-Ganesh	Telugu
1979	Allauddin Adbutha Deepam	Rajasam		G. Devarajan	Telugu
1979	Ponnu Oorukku Pudhusu	Samakozhi	Illayaraja	Illayaraja	Tamil
1979	Ponnu Oorukku Pudhusu	Solai Kuyile		Illayaraja	Tamil
1979	Aarilirunthu Arubathu Varai	Aan Pillai Endralum	B. S.Sasirekha	Illayaraja	Tamil
1979	Agal Vilakku	Yedho Ninaivugal	K. J. Yesudas	Illayaraja	Tamil
1979	Annai Oru Aalayam	Malai Aruvi		Illayaraja	Tamil
1979	Dharma Yuddham	Ada Poya		Illayaraja	Tamil
1979	Chakkalathi	Kozhi Motta Kozhi	B.S.Sasirekha	Illayaraja	Tamil
1979	Kadavul Amaitha Medai	Thangathuraiye		Illayaraja	Tamil
1979	Kalyanaraman	Malargalil Aadum		Illayaraja	Tamil
1979	Niram Maratha Pookal	Aayiram Malargalae	Malaysia Vasudevan, Jency	Illayaraja	Tamil
1979	Niram Maratha Pookal	Iru Paravaigal(Sad)		Illayaraja	Tamil
1979	Poonthalir	Manathil Yenna Ninaivugal	S. P. Balasubrahmanyam	Illayaraja	Tamil
1979	Poonthalir	Kannin Mani Ennai Kandupidi		Illayaraja	Tamil
1979	Rosappu Ravikkaikari	Maaman Oru Naal	S. P. Balasubrahmanyam	Illayaraja	Tamil
1979	Rosappu Ravikkaikari	Uchi Vanguntheduthu	S. P. Balasubrahmanyam	Illayaraja	Tamil
1979	Uthiri Pookkal	Kalyanam Paaru		Illayaraja	Tamil
1979	Vetrikku Oruvan	Muththamizh	T. M. Soundarajan	Illayaraja	Tamil
1979	Suvarilladha Chiththirangal	Aadium Odamaai	S. P. Balasubrahmanyam	Gangai Amaran	Tamil
1979	Inikkum Ilamai	Maalai Mayanginal	P. B. Srinivas	Shankar-Ganesh	Tamil
1979	Oru Vidukadhai Oru Thodarkadhai	Adi Ennoda Vaadi	S. P. Balasubrahmanyam	Gangai Amaran	Tamil
1979	Urvashi Neenu Nanna Preyasi	Masatana	Vani Jayaram, S. P. Balasubrahmanyam, G. Anand	Illayaraja	Kannada
1979	Raathrikal Ninakku Vendi	Aavani Naalile	P. Jayachandran	A. T. Ummer	Malayalam
1980	Chandipriya	Oh Priya Chandi Priya	P. Susheela, S. P. Balasubrahmanyam	P. Adinarayana Rao	Telugu
1980	Buchi Babu	Pasupu Pachathadu	Puspalatha	K. Chakravarthy	Telugu
1980	Kaksha	Orabba Voorura Savalu Chestunnam	S. P. Balasubrahmanyam P. Susheela, Madhavapeddi Ramesh	K. Chakravarthy	Telugu
1980	Jathara	Magha Masa Velalo		G. K. Venkatesh	Telugu
1980	Aatagadu	Nee choope	Madhavapeddi Ramesh	K. Chakravarthy	Telugu
1980	Ram Robert Rahim	Okka Ammayi Okka Abbayi	S. P. Balasubrahmanyam, P. Susheela, G. Anand	K. Chakravarthy	Telugu
1980	Punnami Naagu	Gadusu Chinnadi		K. Chakravarthy	Telugu
1980	Prema Tarangalu	Manasu Okka Mandram		K. Chakravarthy	Telugu
1980	Mogudu Kaavali	O Chilaka Palike Bangarama	S. P. Balasubrahmanyam, P. Susheela	J. V. Raghavulu	Telugu
1980	Vamsa Vruksham	Vamsi Krishna	S. P. Balasubrahmanyam	K. V. Mahadevan	Telugu
1980	Moodu Mulla Bandham	Radhakrishnayya Itu Rara Krisnayya	S. Janaki	Chellapilla Satyam	Telugu
1980	Rakta Bandham	Kakamma Kaki	P. Susheela, G. Anand	G.K. Venkatesh	Telugu
1980	Aarani Mantalu	Annaya Deevana		Chellapilla Satyam	Telugu
1980	Alludu Pattina Bharatam	Anjana Santhana		K. Chakravarthy	Telugu
1980	Rishi Moolam	Vaada En		Illayaraja	Tamil
1980	Johnny	Aasaiye Kaathule		Illayaraja	Tamil
1980	Kallukkul Eeram	Thoppiloru	Malaysia Vasudevan	Illayaraja	Tamil
1980	Murattu Kaalai	Maame Machchan		Illayaraja	Tamil
1980	Aayiram Vaasal Idhayam	Hey Enna Aasa	Malaysia Vasudevan	Illayaraja	Tamil
1980	Ellam Un Kairasi	Cherikku Sevai	S. Janaki, S. P. Balasubrahmanyam	Illayaraja	Tamil
1980	Nadhiyai Thedi Vandha Kadal	Thavikkadhu Thayamgunthu	P. Jayachandran	Illayaraja	Tamil
1980	Nadhiyai Thedi Vandha Kadal	Poonthottam Poovil		Illayaraja	Tamil
1980	Nadhiyai Thedi Vandha Kadal	Varatha Kalangal	P. Susheela	Illayaraja	Tamil
1980	Samanthipoo	Maalai Velai	S.P. Balasubrahmanyam	Malaysia Vasudevan	Tamil
1980	Samanthipoo	Kanavugale		Malaysia Vasudevan	Tamil
1980	Samanthipoo	Kadavulai Nenaichu	Malaysia Vasudevan, Saibaba	Malaysia Vasudevan	Tamil
1980	Mazhalai Pattalam	Gumthalakkadi		M. S. Viswanathan	Tamil
1980	Enga Ooru Rasathi	Ponmaanai Thedi	Malaysia Vasudevan	Gangai Amaran	Tamil
1980	Enga Ooru Rasathi	Sirrikki Oruthi Singara	Malaysia Vasudevan	Gangai Amaran	Tamil
1980	Mangala Nayagi	Oyamma	P. Susheela	V. Kumar	Tamil
1980	Mangala Nayagi	Mapillai	T. M. Soundarajan	V.Kumar	Tamil
1980	Kannil Theriyum Kathaikal	Onnu Rendu Moonu	B.S.Sasirekha	Agathiyar	Tamil
1980	Thai Ponhal	Pani Vizhum Poo	Malaysia Vasudevan	Illayaraja	Tamil
1980	Kanni Theevu	Hey Onna Rendaa	Malaysia Vasudevan, Saibaba	Illayaraja	Tamil
1980	Kanni Theevu	Kandane Kandane Kaatil	Malaysia Vasudevan	Illayaraja	Tamil
1980	Naan Potta Savaal	Silarai Devai	Vani Jayaram	Illayaraja	Tamil
1980	Kaali (1980 film)	Thithikkum	S. P. Balasubrahmanyam, Kalyan	Illayaraja	Tamil
1980	Theru Vilakku	Aani Aadi Aavani	Vani Jayaram	Gangai Amaran	Tamil
1980	Makkala Sainya	Dhimma Thakka Dhimmi	T.K. Kala, L. R. Anjali, B. S. Sasirekha	M. S. Viswanathan	Kannada
1980	Janma Janmada Anubandha	Gandaagi Naanu	S. P. Balasubrahmanyam	Illayaraja	Kannada
1980	Pattanakke Banda Pathniyaru	Malebilla Banna	S. P. Balasubrahmanyam	M. Ranga Rao	Kannada
1981	Ooruki Monagadu	Erra Tholu	S. P. Balasubrahmanyam	K. Chakravarthy	Telugu
1981	Thodu Dongalu	Allari Mallela Aavirilo	S. P. Balasubrahmanyam, P. Susheela, Madhavapeddi Ramesh	Chellapilla Satyam	Telugu
1981	Erra Mallelu	Bangaru Maa Thalli	S. P. Balasubrahmanyam, G. Anand	K. Chakravarthy	Telugu
1981	Erra Mallelu	Nampalli Station Kadi		K. Chakravarthy	Telugu
1981	Erra Mallelu	O Vasantha Bhamini	Madhavapeddi Ramesh	K. Chakravarthy	Telugu
1981	Erra Mallelu	Banjaru Bhoomullo	S. P. Balasubrahmanyam	K. Chakravarthy	Telugu
1981	Satyam Sivam	Manchi Tarunam	S. Janaki, S. P. Balasubrahmanyam	K. Chakravarthy	Telugu
1981	Satyam Sivam	Velugu Needallo	S. Janaki, S. P. Balasubrahmanyam	K. Chakravarthy	Telugu
1981	Prema Kanuka	Vanta Chesi Chupistha	S. P. Balasubrahmanyam	K. Chakravarthy	Telugu
1981	Rani Kasula Rangamma	Lingu Lituku	P. Susheela	K. Chakravarthy	Telugu
1981	Seethakoka Chilaka	Maate Mantramu	S. P. Balasubrahmanyam	Illayaraja	Telugu
1981	Chilipi Mogudu	Oh Chinna Maata	G. Anand	Illayaraja	Telugu
1981	Chilipi Mogudu	Ninna Sandhya Velalo	S. P. Balasubrahmanyam	Illayaraja	Telugu
1981	Srirasthu Subhamasthu	Chinukanti Nadumameda	S. P. Balasubrahmanyam	J. V. Raghavulu	Telugu
1981	Vidiyum Varai Kaathiru	Pesu Ennanbe	S. P. Balasubrahmanyam, B. S. Sasirekha	Illayaraja	Tamil
1981	Bala Nagamma	Aadalaam Ennanbe		Illayaraja	Tamil
1981	Bala Nagamma	Vaaname Kaaakum		Illayaraja	Tamil
1981	Enakkaga Kaathiru	Pani Mazhai	Deepan Chakravarthy	Illayaraja	Tamil
1981	Indru Poi Naalai Vaa	Mathana Mohana	Malaysia Vasudevan	Illayaraja	Tamil
1981	Netrikkan	Raja Rani Jackie	Malaysia Vasudevan	Illayaraja	Tamil
1981	Ram Lakshman	Valibame Vaa	S. P. Balasubrahmanyam	Illayaraja	Tamil
1981	Meendum Kokila	Chinnachiru Vayathil	K. J. Yesudas	Illayaraja	Tamil
1981	Nenjile Thunivirunthal	Oorumille	S. P. Balasubrahmanyam	Shankar-Ganesh	Tamil
1981	Amara Kaaviyam	Selvame Ore Murai		M. S. Viswanathan	Tamil
1981	Keezh Vaanam Sivakkum	Ponnana Ulagam	S. P. Balasubrahmanyam	M.S. Viswanathan	Tamil
1981	Kudumbam Oru Kadambam	Kalviyil Sarasawathi	Vani Jayaram, Uma Raman	M.S. Viswanathan	Tamil
1981	Ranuva Veeran	Sonnaithane Theriyum	S. P. Balasubrahmanyam	M.S. Viswanathan	Tamil
1981	Engamma Maharani	Ethanai Kuzhandal	Uma Ramanan, Krishnamoorthy	Shankar Ganesh	Tamil
1981	Nenjil Oru Mull	Raagam	Deepan Chakravarthy	G. K. Venkatesh	Tamil
1981	Jeevakke Jeeva	Thana Thandana	S. P. Balasubrahmanyam	Rajan-Nagendra	Kannada
1981	Ranganayaki	Mandhara Pushpavu	P. Jayachandran	M. Ranga Rao	Kannada
1981	Ranganayaki	Kannada Naadina	S. P. Balasubrahmanyam	M. Ranga Rao	Kannada
1981	Snehitara Savaal	Alla Nee Illi Baaraya	S. P. Balasubrahmanyam, P. Susheela	Chellapilla Satyam	Kannada
1981	Poocha Sanyasi	Ivanoru Sanyasi	Sujatha, Vani Jayaram, Ambili (singer)	K. J. Yesudas	Malayalam
1981	Poocha Sanyasi	Neelaranyam	K. J. Yesudas	K. J. Yesudas	Malayalam
1981	Poocha Sanyasi	Engane		K. J. Yesudas	Malayalam
1981	Kaahalam	Raajasadassini Lakkam	L. R. Anjali	A. T. Ummer	Malayalam
1981	Aakkramanam	Lilly Lilly My Darling	S. P. Balasubrahmanyam	Shyam	Malayalam
1981	Jeevikkaram Padikkanam	Ambeyyan	P. Jayachandran	Rajan-Nagendra	Malayalam
1981	Jeevikkaram Padikkanam	Oh Praananaadha		Rajan-Nagendra	Malayalam
1982	Edi Dharmam Edi Nyayam?	Trailer Ee	S. P. Balasubrahmanyam, P. Susheela	K. V. Mahadevan	Telugu
1982	Maro Malupu	Erra errani Buggaladhana	S. P. Balasubrahmanyam	G. K. Venkatesh	Telugu
1982	Maro Malupu	Kanulapaina Thuntari Thummedha	S. P. Balasubrahmanyam	G. K. Venkatesh	Telugu
1982	Justice Chowdary	Sri Lakshmi Pelliki	S. P. Balasubrahmanyam, P. Susheela	K. Chakravarthy	Telugu
1982	Nivuru Gappina Nippu	Vachadamma Pelli Koduku	S. P. Balasubrahmanyam	K. Chakravarthy	Telugu
1982	Idi Pellantara	vasantham sharathu	S. P. Balasubrahmanyam	K. Chakravarthy	Telugu
1982	Swayamvaram	Harivillu Podarillu	S.P.Vasantha	Chellapilla Satyam	Telugu
1982	Naa Pere Johnny	Chakkadanala chinnadhira		Illayaraja	Telugu
1982	Pagabattina Simham	Allugari Illu Mallepoola Villu	S. P. Balasubrahmanyam	Chellapilla Satyam	Telugu
1982	Krishnavataram	Meluko Radha	P. Susheela	K. V. Mahadevan	Telugu
1982	Krishnavataram	Sinari Navvu	S. P. Balasubrahmanyam	K. V. Mahadevan	Telugu
1982	Ekalavya	Aata Bhala Pata Bhala	S. P. Balasubrahmanyam, P. Susheela	K. V. Mahadevan	Telugu
1982	Palleturi Simham	Naatu Bandi Naatu bandi		Illayaraja	Telugu
1982	Subhalekha	Ayithe	S. P. Balasubrahmanyam	K. V. Mahadevan	Telugu
1982	Devatha	Challagali Cheppindi	S. P. Balasubrahmanyam, P. Susheela	K. Chakravarthy	Telugu
1982	Thaai Mookaambikai	Malai Naadu		Illayaraja	Tamil
1982	Valibamey Vaa Vaa	Ennadi Ennadi		Illayaraja	Tamil
1982	Valibamey Vaa Vaa	Ponvaana Poingavil	K. J. Yesudas	Illayaraja	Tamil
1982	Sakalakala Vallavan	Kattavandi		Illayaraja	Tamil
1982	Gopurangal Saivathillai	En Purushanthan	B. S. Sasirekha	Illayaraja	Tamil
1982	Kanne Radha	Maalai Suda Kanne Radha	S. P. Balasubrahmanyam	Illayaraja	Tamil
1982	Kanne Radha	Vaalai Paruvathilae	P. Susheela	Illayaraja	Tamil
1982	Kelviyum Naane Bathilum Naane	Aadikondu Aadum	Unni Menon	Illayaraja	Tamil
1982	Kozhi Koovuthu	Veeraiyya Veeraiyya		Illayaraja	Tamil
1982	Kozhi Koovuthu	Potta Pilla	Malaysia Vasudevan	Illayaraja	Tamil
1982	Thanikattu Raja	Rasave Unna Naan Ennithan		Illayaraja	Tamil
1982	Agaya Gangai	Mama Mama		Illayaraja	Tamil
1982	Azhagiya Kanne	Maakambikai		Illayaraja	Tamil
1982	Adhisayappiravigal	Mogam Ennakkoru Raagam	S. P. Balasubrahmanyam	Shankar-Ganesh	Tamil
1982	Oorum Uravum	Kanni Penn	Malaysia Vasudevan	Shankar-Ganesh	Tamil
1982	Poi Satchi	Machan Nee Aarumugam		Shankar-Ganesh	Tamil
1982	Sangili	Ezhi Kadal	B.S. Sasirekha	M.S. Viswanathan	Tamil
1982	Om Shakti	Omkariye Naa Kaliye	T. L. Maharajan	Shankar-Ganesh	Tamil
1982	Karmika Kallanalla	Ninagagi Kadidde	S. P. Balasubrahmanyam	G. K. Venkatesh	Kannada
1982	Kaaliya Mardhanam	Njanoru Thapaswini		K. J. Joy	Malayalam
1982	Ee Nadu	Ambili Manavatti	K. J. Yesudas, S. Janaki	Shyam	Malayalam
1983	Bezawada Bebbuli	Navvithe Vennela	S. P. Balasubrahmanyam	K. Chakravarthy	Telugu
1983	Debbaku Debba	Joru Vana Kurisindi	S. P. Balasubrahmanyam	Illayaraja	Telugu
1983	Debbaku Debba	Ra Raa Mama		Illayaraja	Telugu
1983	Debbaku Debba	Aata Paata	S. P. Balasubrahmanyam	Illayaraja	Telugu
1983	Debbaku Debba	Ammayi Andalani	S. P. Balasubrahmanyam	Illayaraja	Telugu
1983	Sagara Sangamam	Vedham	S. P. Balasubrahmanyam	Illayaraja	Telugu
1983	Sagara Sangamam	Ve Vela Gopemala	S. P. Balasubrahmanyam	Illayaraja	Telugu
1983	Sagara Sangamam	Nadha Vindhom	S. P. Balasubrahmanyam	Illayaraja	Telugu
1983	Ramarajyamlo Bheemaraju	Kaaboye Sreemathi	P. Susheela	K. Chakravarthy	Telugu
1983	Prema Sagaram	Andhalolike Sundari	S. P. Balasubrahmanyam	T.Rajender	Telugu
1983	Ananda Bhairavi	Sudigalilona Deepam	S. P. Balasubrahmanyam	Ramesh Naidu	Telugu
1983	Poratam	Ee Devullu	S. P. Balasubrahmanyam	K. Chakravarthy	Telugu
1983	Maga Maharaju	Maa Amma Chintamani		K. Chakravarthy	Telugu
1983	Neti Bharatam	Atho Podam Rave	Vandemataram Srinivas	K. Chakravarthy	Telugu
1983	Palletoori Monagadu	Gunde Gadhi Kali	Madhavapeddi Ramesh	K. Chakravarthy	Telugu
1983	Jalsa Rayudu	Are Rama		Illayaraja	Telugu
1983	Vadante Pelli	Raa Raa Panthulayya	S. P. Balasubrahmanyam	Illayaraja	Telugu
1983	Andhra Kesari	Burra Katha	P. B. Srinivas, S. P. Balasubrahmanyam	Chellapilla Satyam	Telugu
1983	Aanandha Kummi	Oru Killi Uruguthu	S. Janaki	Illayaraja	Tamil
1983	Mann Vasanai	Vangadi Vangadi	Malaysia Vasudevan	Illayaraja	Tamil
1983	Indru Nee Naalai Naan	Vaa Pulla Nalla Pulla	S. P. Balasubrahmanyam	Illayaraja	Tamil
1983	Indru Nee Naalai Naan	Mottu vitta Mullai Kodu	S. Janaki	Illayaraja	Tamil
1983	Mundhanai Mudichu	Naan Pudicha Mapillae	S. Janaki	Illayaraja	Tamil
1983	Mundhanai Mudichu	Vaa Vaa Vathiyare	Malaysia Vasudevan	Illayaraja	Tamil
1983	Aayiram Nilave Vaa	Ooty Kulire	Malaysia Vasudevan	Illayaraja	Tamil
1983	Bhagavathipuram Railway Gate	Kaalai Neega Kaate	Deepan Chakravarthy	Illayaraja	Tamil
1983	Bhagavathipuram Railway Gate	Samba Pudhu'		Illayaraja	Tamil
1983	Adutha Varisu	Vaazhga Raja Vaazhga Rani	S. P. Balasubrahmanyam, S. Janaki	Illayaraja	Tamil
1983	Malaiyoor Mambattiyan	Aaduthadi	Malaysia Vasudevan	Illayaraja	Tamil
1983	Malaiyoor Mambattiyan	Vellarikka	Gangai Amaran	Illayaraja	Tamil
1983	Manaivi Solle Manthiram	Maama Thallippadu	S. P. Balasubrahmanyam	Illayaraja	Tamil
1983	Manaivi Solle Manthiram	Maami Maare	Malaysia Vasudevan	Illayaraja	Tamil
1983	Muthu Engal Sothu	Naan Unthan		Illayaraja	Tamil
1983	Raagangal Maaruvathillai	Hey Alangaari	Malaysia Vasudevan	Illayaraja	Tamil
1983	Raagangal Maaruvathillai	Naalellam Naala Naalu	S. P. Balasubrahmanyam	Illayaraja	Tamil
1983	Antha Sila Naatkal	Raajaa Raani	Krishna chandar	Illayaraja	Tamil
1983	Veetula Raman Veliyila Krishnan	Aatha Pakkam	S. P. Balasubrahmanyam	Illayaraja	Tamil
1983	Vellai Roja	Naagoor Pakkathile	Malaysia Vasudevan, Illayaraja	Illayaraja	Tamil
1983	Oru Odai Nadhiyagirathu	Rathiri Pozhuthu	P. Jayachandran	Illayaraja	Tamil
1983	Ilamai Kaalangal	Padippile Zero		Illayaraja	Tamil
1983	Ilamai Kaalangal	Yogam Ulla Rani	Malaysia Vasudevan	Illayaraja	Tamil
1983	En Aasai Unnoduthan	Unnakkaaga Poojai Seidha	P. Jayachandran	Shankar-Ganesh	Tamil
1983	Dowry Kalyanam	Enthan Kannana Kanneti	P. Jayachandran	M.S. Viswanathan	Tamil
1983	Sandhippu	Sollappur Raja Sollappur Rani	T. M. Soundarajan, Malaysia Vasudevan, P. Susheela	M.S. Viswanathan	Tamil
1983	Sivappu Sooriyan	Naan Kanda Kanda		M.S.Viswanathan	Tamil
1983	Saranalayam	Kollimalai	Malaysia Vasudevan	M.S. Viswanathan	Tamil
1983	Thoongatha Kannindru Ondru	Aadivellam	Malaysia Vasudevan	K.V. Mahadevan	Tamil
1983	Neethibathi	Pasamalare	T. M. Soundarajan, P. Susheela	Gangai Amaran	Tamil
1983	Sattam	Thekam Pattu	S. P. Balasubrahmanyam	Gangai Amaran	Tamil
1983	Imaigal	Enga Rajyathi	Malaysia Vasudevan	Gangai Amaran	Tamil
1983	Jothi	Aasai Madhana Singara Vadhana		Illayaraja	Tamil
1983	Jothi	Gamma Gamma Ena Suda	S. P. Balasubrahmanyam	Illayaraja	Tamil
1983	Salangai Oli	Nada Vindongal	S. P. Balasubrahmanyam	Illayaraja	Tamil
1983	Salangai Oli	Vedam	S. P. Balasubrahmanyam	Illayaraja	Tamil
1983	Salangai Oli	Van Pole Vanam	S. P. Balasubrahmanyam	Illayaraja	Tamil
1983	Gandharvagiri	Onalle	S. P. Balasubrahmanyam	Upendra Kumar	Kannada
1983	Gandharvagiri	Gandharvagiriyali	S. P. Balasubrahmanyam, S. Janaki	Upendra Kumar	Kannada
1983	Pallavi Anu Pallavi	Hrudaya Rangoli		Illayaraja	Kannada
1983	Ananda Bhairavi	Chottudha Hottegagi	S. P. Balasubrahmanyam	Ramesh Naidu	Kannada
1983	Ibbani Karagithu	Habba Habba		Rajan-Nagendra	Kannada
1983	Onde Guri	Anda Naai Chanda Nodi	S. P. Balasubrahmanyam	Rajan-Nagendra	Kannada
1983	Hello Madras Girl	Madhuramee darshanam	K. J. Yesudas	Gangai Amaran	Malayalam
1983	Justice Raja	Kanimalare	K. J. Yesudas	Gangai Amaran	Malayalam
1984	Agni Gundam	Chitti Nayana		K. Chakravarthy	Telugu
1984	Agni Gundam	Rumbha Rumbho Ho	S. P. Balasubrahmanyam	K. Chakravarthy	Telugu
1984	Swathi	Kalyanam Kamaneeyam	P. Susheela	K. Chakravarthy	Telugu
1984	Seethamma Pelli	Konaseemalo Kougulesina	P. Susheela	S. P. Balasubrahmanyam	Telugu
1984	Seethamma Pelli	Emmaayane Thalli	P. Susheela	S. P. Balasubrahmanyam	Telugu
1984	Disco King	Inte Inte ee lokam	S. P. Balasubrahmanyam	K. Chakravarthy	Telugu
1984	Sitaara	Kinnerasaani	S. P. Balasubrahmanyam	Illayaraja	Telugu
1984	Sitaara	Arjuna Mantram	S. P. Balasubrahmanyam	Illayaraja	Telugu
1984	Devanthakudu	Chellammaku Pellanta	S. P. Balasubrahmanyam	J. V. Raghavulu	Telugu
1984	Veerabhadrudu	Mavayya Mavayya	S. P. Balasubrahmanyam	Illayaraja	Telugu
1984	Srivariki Premalekha	Pelladu Pelladu	S. P. Balasubrahmanyam	Ramesh Naidu	Telugu
1984	Srivariki Premalekha	Raghuvamsa Sudha	S. P. Balasubrahmanyam	Ramesh Naidu	Telugu
1984	Tandava Krishnudu	Sodicheppaku Somavaramu	P. Susheela	K. Chakravarthy	Telugu
1984	Allullostunnaru	Muddaina Poddaina	G. Anand, S. P. Balasubrahmanyam, P. Susheela	K. V. Mahadevan	Telugu
1984	Mangammagari Manavadu	Gumma Choopu	S. P. Balasubrahmanyam	K.V. Mahadevan	Telugu
1984	Janani Janmabhoomi	Sari Ganga Tanallu	S. P. Balasubrahmanyam	K. V. Mahadevan	Telugu
1984	Koteeswarudu	Matthu Matthu	S. P. Balasubrahmanyam	K. Chakravarthy	Telugu
1984	Justice Chakravarthy	Seethammaki Cheyistini	S. P. Balasubrahmanyam, P. Susheela	Ramesh Naidu	Telugu
1984	Ammayilu Preminchandi	Kanepilla Valachenu	S. P. Balasubrahmanyam	Illayaraja	Telugu
1984	Ammayilu Preminchandi	Maa Annaku Eduru Ledura	S. P. Balasubrahmanyam	Illayaraja	Telugu
1984	Hero (1984 film)	Yettettaddisthavo	S. P. Balasubrahmanyam, S. Janaki	Krishna-Chakra	Telugu
1984	Dhavani Kanavugal	Oru Nayagan	S. P. Balasubrahmanyam	Illayaraja	Tamil
1984	Ezhuthatha Sattangal	Aalankatti Maamalaliyaam	S. P. Balasubrahmanyam	Illayaraja	Tamil
1984	Ingeyum Oru Gangai	Santhana Kiliye		Illayaraja	Tamil
1984	Ingeyum Oru Gangai	Aattam Thaan		Illayaraja	Tamil
1984	Kai Kodukkum Kai	Kannukkulle Yaaro	P. Susheela	Illayaraja	Tamil
1984	Naalai Unathu Naal	Nalla Naal		Illayaraja	Tamil
1984	Naan Paadum Paadal	Machane Vatchikodi	Gangai Amaran	Illayaraja	Tamil
1984	Nalla Naal	Venam Venam Irellam		Illayaraja	Tamil
1984	Nerupukkul Eeram	Maamane Maamane	Sai Baba	Illayaraja	Tamil
1984	Vaazhkai	Ennarumai selvangal	S. P. Balasubrahmanyam, Deepan Chakravarthy	Illayaraja	Tamil
1984	Vaazhkai	Kattilollava	Malaysia Vasudevan, P. Jayachandran	Illayaraja	Tamil
1984	24 Mani Neram	Kallori Manavaraa	S. Janaki	Illayaraja	Tamil
1984	Mudivalla Arambam	Then eduka ponam	Malaysia Vasudevan	Illayaraja	Tamil
1984	Ninaivugal	Kuthuthaiyya		Shankar-Ganesh	Tamil
1984	Nandri	Naan Thain Rukmani		Shankar-Ganesh	Tamil
1984	Vai Pandal	Nallakalam Pirakkirathu	Vivek Sarathi	Shankar-Ganesh	Tamil
1984	Vai Pandal	Top Takkar		Shankar-Ganesh	Tamil
1984	Vai Pandal	Panagattu Wari'		Shankar-Ganesh	Tamil
1984	Rusi	Vaanam Illamal	Malaysia Vasudevan	Gangai Amaran	Tamil
1984	Sattathai Thiruthungal	Naan Malithan		Gangai Amaran	Tamil
1984	Vidhi	Love Lovethaan	S. P. Balasubrahmanyam	Shankar-Ganesh	Tamil
1984	January 1 (film)	Nee Oru Pathini Illai	S. P. Balasubrahmanyam, Grubb Singh	Illayaraja	Tamil
1984	Naanayam Illatha Naanayam	Mama Varalama	Malaysia Vasudevan	Vijay Anand	Tamil
1984	Pozhuthu Vidinchachu	Aatha Manasu	Malaysia Vasudevan	Illayaraja	Tamil
1984	Pozhuthu Vidinchachu	Athai Tavamiruntha		Illayaraja	Tamil
1984	My Dear Kuttichathan	Aalippazham Perukkaan	S. Janaki	Illayaraja	Malayalam
1984	Sagara Sangamam	Nada Vindhom	S. P. Balasubrahmanyam	Illayaraja	Malayalam
1984	Sagara Sangamam	Vedham	S. P. Balasubrahmanyam	Illayaraja	Malayalam
1984	Mooru Janma	Nannavane Channigane	S. Janaki	Rajan-Nagendra	Kannada
1984	Indina Bharatha	Beda Beda Thayi Sakari Aspathrege		K. Chakravarthy	Kannada
1985	Radha Madhavi	Maata Lone	S. P. Balasubrahmanyam	Illayaraja	Telugu
1985	Radha Madhavi	Vintha Paruvana	B. Vasantha	Illayaraja	Telugu
1985	Dongala Vetagadu	A1 Kanne Pilla	S. P. Balasubrahmanyam	Illayaraja	Telugu
1985	Dongala Vetagadu	Aasalu Palikenu	S. P. Balasubrahmanyam	Illayaraja	Telugu
1985	Dongala Vetagadu	Kanulu Palike	S. P. Balasubrahmanyam	Illayaraja	Telugu
1985	Dongala Vetagadu	Naaku Yogam		Illayaraja	Telugu
1985	Kattula Kondayya	Light Guchukunthundhi	Madhavapeddi Ramesh	K. Chakravarthy	Telugu
1985	Udaya Geetham	Pade Ede Adenule	S. P. Balasubrahmanyam	Illayaraja	Telugu
1985	Udaya Geetham	Palikinchave Nee Kavitha	S. P. Balasubrahmanyam	Illayaraja	Telugu
1985	Illale Devata	Rani Garu Maharani	S. P. Balasubrahmanyam	K. Chakravarthy	Telugu
1985	Preminchu Pelladu	Ade Pade Pillalam	S. P. Balasubrahmanyam	Illayaraja	Telugu
1985	Muchataga Mugguru	Muchataga muggururam	S. P. Balasubrahmanyam, P. Susheela	K. Chakravarthy	Telugu
1985	Mayuri	Ee Padaam		S. P. Balasubrahmanyam	Telugu
1985	Kongumudi	Appalakonda		S. P. Balasubrahmanyam	Telugu
1985	Kongumudi	Shiva Shiva Agara		S. P. Balasubrahmanyam	Telugu
1985	Nyayam Meere Cheppali	Puvvula Putillu		K. Chakravarthy	Telugu
1985	Nyayam Meere Cheppali	Judhom Jeevitam Okka Pandem		K. Chakravarthy	Telugu
1985	Bullet	Radha krishnudiki	S. P. Balasubrahmanyam	K. V. Mahadevan	Telugu
1985	Vandemataram	Allatappa Adadani Kadhura	P. Susheela	K. Chakravarthy	Telugu
1985	Vandemataram	Naa Peru Palletooru		K. Chakravarthy	Telugu
1985	Jalsa Bullodu	Andala Aamani	S. P. Balasubrahmanyam	Illayaraja	Telugu
1985	Jalsa Bullodu	Dikkulani Padenule		Illayaraja	Telugu
1985	Sravanthi	Sravanthi Sravanthi (title song)		K. Chakravarthy	Telugu
1985	Khaidi Veta	ABC Chadavali	S. P. Balasubrahmanyam	Illayaraja	Telugu
1985	Khaidi Veta	Okka Roja Puvvu	S. P. Balasubrahmanyam	Illayaraja	Telugu
1985	Khaidi Veta	Oh Myna	S. P. Balasubrahmanyam	Illayaraja	Telugu
1985	Chinna Veedu	Ada Machamulla	S. P. Balasubrahmanyam, S. Janaki	Illayaraja	Tamil
1985	Andha Oru Nimidam	Thevai Indha Paavai	S. P. Balasubrahmanyam	Illayaraja	Tamil
1985	Aduthathu Albert	Hey Indhira	S. P. Balasubrahmanyam	Illayaraja	Tamil
1985	Hello Yaar Pesurathu	Pachchai Paadi	Malaysia Vasudevan	Illayaraja	Tamil
1985	Pagal Nilavu	Nee Appothu	Malaysia Vasudevan	Illayaraja	Tamil
1985	Oru Kaidhiyin Diary	Naan Thaan Sooran	S. P. Balasubrahmanyam	Illayaraja	Tamil
1985	Ketti Melam	Kandangi Selai		Illayaraja	Tamil
1985	Ketti Melam	Vaasam Veesuthe		Illayaraja	Tamil
1985	Meendum Parasakthi	Sandhya Kadaiya	Malaysia Vasudevan	Illayaraja	Tamil
1985	Naane Raja Naane Mandhiri	Manthakasamudan	Illayaraja, T. S. Raghavendra, Gangai Amaran	Illayaraja	Tamil
1985	Neethiyin Marupakkam	Hey Pulla	K.S. Chitra, B. S.Sasirekha	Illayaraja	Tamil
1985	Padikkadha Pannaiyar	Konatha Sengarumbu	Deepan Chakravarthy	Illayaraja	Tamil
1985	Padikkadha Pannaiyar	Oonnum Theriyatha	Malaysia Vasudevan	Illayaraja	Tamil
1985	Urimai	Kurukku kikuthu	Malaysia Vasudevan	Illayaraja	Tamil
1985	Poi Mugangal	Uttam Pudu Pata	S. P. Balasubrahmanyam	Shankar-Ganesh	Tamil
1985	Chain Jayapal	Thazham Poivinile	Malaysia Vasudevan	Shankar-Ganesh	Tamil
1985	Chidambara Rahasiyam	Malai Varungira	P. Jayachandran	Shankar-Ganesh	Tamil
1985	Chidambara Rahasiyam	Hello Dear Sir	S.G. Saagari	Shankar-Ganesh	Tamil
1985	Chidambara Rahasiyam	Chukkan Chikkan Doi	P. Jayachandran	Shankar-Ganesh	Tamil
1985	Chidambara Rahasiyam	Devakottai Muthulingam	Malaysia Vasudevan	Shankar-Ganesh	Tamil
1985	Kutravaaligal	Iravule Nilavile	S. P. Balasubrahmanyam	Shankar-Ganesh	Tamil
1985	Kutravaaligal	Kettimelam		Shankar-Ganesh	Tamil
1985	Kutravaaligal	Aadunna		Shankar-Ganesh	Tamil
1985	Aval Sumangalithan	Vaanga Mappilla	S. P. Balasubrahmanyam	M.S. Viswanathan	Tamil
1985	Yemaatrathe Yemaaraathe	Pudikkaiyile	P. Jayachandran	Chandrabose (Composer)	Tamil
1985	Yemaatrathe Yemaaraathe	Illa Maalai Nilavo	S. P. Balasubrahmanyam	Chandrabose (Composer)	Tamil
1985	Arthamulla Aasaigal	Intha Vaanam Antha Megam	S. P. Balasubrahmanyam	Gangai Amaran	Tamil
1985	Marudhani	Marundhaniya	Uma Raman	Gangai Amaran	Tamil
1985	Naagam	Amma Ammamma		Shankar-Ganesh	Tamil
1985	Naam Iruvar	Onnudhan		Gangai Amaran	Tamil
1985	Pudhu Yugam	Anandam	S. N. Surendra	Gangai Amaran	Tamil
1985	Raman Sreeraman	Ayya Ayya	Malaysia Vasudevan	Sivaji Raja	Tamil
1985	Viswanathan Velai Venum	Janani	P. Jayachandran	Shankar-Ganesh	Tamil
1985	Mannukketha Ponnu	Vethalai Madichi	Gangai Amaran	Gangai Amaran	Tamil
1985	Aagaya Thamaraigal	Anandam Geetham	Malaysia Vasudevan	Gangai Amaran	Tamil
1985	Aagaya Thamaraigal	Gettikaari		Gangai Amaran	Tamil
1985	Naan Ungal Rasigan	Poovvula Maalai	Malaysia Vasudevan	Gangai Amaran	Tamil
1985	Rajagopuram	Vaelanjrukku	K. J. Yesudas	Illayaraja	Tamil
1985	Sravanthi	Mounam Kaadhal Mozhi	S. P. Balasubrahmanyam	K. Chakravarthy	Tamil
1985	Sravanthi	Poovai Pol Vaazhava	S. P. Balasubrahmanyam	K. Chakravarthy	Tamil
1985	Sravanthi	Kai Thoda Pogum Nayagan	Madhavapeddi Ramesh	K. Chakravarthy	Tamil
1985	Sravanthi	Sravanthi Sravanthi		K. Chakravarthy	Tamil
1985	Sedina Hakki	Mava Mava		Rajan-Nagendra	Kannada
1985	Jeevante Jeevan	Nirarve Niravadyathe		Shyam	Malayalam
1985	Sanjog	Aankh Micholi Aise	Kavita Krishnamurthy	Laxmikant Pyarelal	Hindi
1985	Sanjog	Maa Main Kahan	Kavitha Krishnamurthy	Laxmikant Pyarelal	Hindi
1986	Ladies Tailor	Gopi Lola	S. P. Balasubrahmanyam	Illayaraja	Telugu
1986	Ladies Tailor	Ekkada Ekkada	S. P. Balasubrahmanyam	Illayaraja	Telugu
1986	Dhairyavanthudu	Tammaku Tammaku	S. P. Balasubrahmanyam	Ramesh Naidu	Telugu
1986	Repati Pourulu	Ayya Nenu chadivi	Vandemataram Srinivas	K. Chakravarthy	Telugu
1986	Repati Pourulu	Matrudevobhava		K. Chakravarthy	Telugu
1986	Repati Pourulu	Repati Pourulam	S. Janaki	K. Chakravarthy	Telugu
1986	Chantabbai	Atlanti Italanti	S. P. Balasubrahmanyam	K. Chakravarthy	Telugu
1986	Karu Diddina Kapuram	Sagara Madhanam	S. P. Balasubrahmanyam	Raj-Koti	Telugu
1986	Agent Vikram 007	Naa Jodi Pala Kova	S. P. Balasubrahmanyam	Illayaraja	Telugu
1986	Agent Vikram 007	Vanithamani	S. P. Balasubrahmanyam	Illayaraja	Telugu
1986	Agent Vikram 007	Vayasu Pilichindi	S. P. Balasubrahmanyam	Illayaraja	Telugu
1986	Pavitra	Okka Sukka	Madhavapeddi Ramesh	Krishna-Chakra	Telugu
1986	Anuraga Sangamam	Madhuvulokile Patane	S. P. Balasubrahmanyam	Illayaraja	Telugu
1986	Kashmora	Rama Bhaktha Hai Hanuman	S. P. Balasubrahmanyam	K. Chakravarthy	Telugu
1986	Swati Mutyam	Dharmam Sharanam	S. P. Balasubrahmanyam	Illayaraja	Telugu
1986	Swati Mutyam	Raama Kanavemira	S. P. Balasubrahmanyam	Illayaraja	Telugu
1986	Swati Mutyam	Pattuseera Testanani	S. P. Balasubrahmanyam	Illayaraja	Telugu
1986	Swati Mutyam	Lali Lali	S. P. Balasubrahmanyam	Illayaraja	Telugu
1986	Nippulanti Manishi	Maa Amma Kothimeera Akku	P. Susheela	K. Chakravarthy	Telugu
1986	Driver Babu	Mudduku Neemu Muggururam	S. P. Balasubrahmanyam, S.P.Pallavi	K. Chakravarthy	Telugu
1986	Krishna Garadi	Rukinamma Rupamokate	S. P. Balasubrahmanyam, P. Susheela	K. Chakravarthy	Telugu
1986	Pelli Pichollu	Naa Paata Vintava		Illayaraja	Telugu
1986	Jailu Pakshi	Ammalaganna Amma	P. Susheela	K. V. Mahadevan	Telugu
1986	Nireekshana	Tiyanndi Danimma	S. P. Balasubrahmanyam	Illayaraja	Telugu
1986	Enakku Nane Needipathi	Yaaro sonagalam		Illayaraja	Tamil
1986	Kannukku Mai Ezhuthu	Thambala Sundariyae	Malaysia Vasudevan, Saibaba, Viayaramani	Illayaraja	Tamil
1986	Thazhuvatha Kaigal	Kudumbathai Uruvakka	Uma Raman, B. S. Sasirekha	Illayaraja	Tamil
1986	Dharma Pathini	Sumangali Poojai	P. Susheela	Illayaraja	Tamil
1986	Mella Thirandhathu Kadhavu	Sakkara Kattiku	K.S. Chitra, B.S.Sasirekha	Illayaraja	Tamil
1986	Vikram	En Jodi Manja Kurvi	S. P. Balasubrahmanyam, K.S. Chitra	Illayaraja	Tamil
1986	Melmaruvathur Arpudhangal	Vanga Kadalin		K.V. Mahadevan	Tamil
1986	Marumagal	Rajavae Unthan Rajiyathi	S. P. Balasubrahmanyam, Vani Jayaram	Chandrabose (Composer)	Tamil
1986	Viduthalai	Nattukulla Namma Pathi	Malaysia Vasudevan	Chandrabose (Composer)	Tamil
1986	Mounam Kalaikirathu	Engemma Neepora	S. P. Balasubrahmanyam	Shankar-Ganesh	Tamil
1986	Piranthaen Valarnthaen	Maava Araikka	Malaysia Vasudevan	Shankar-Ganesh	Tamil
1986	Sarvam Sakthimayam	Vanthene		Ben Surender	Tamil
1986	Lakshmi Vandhachu	Ellorum Thedum		Raveendran	Tamil
1986	Agni Kanal	Soodungal Maalaiyai	Mano	K. Chakravarthy	Tamil
1986	Agni Kanal	En Pallaiye		K. Chakravarthy	Tamil
1986	Agni Kanal	Poovukkulle	Mano	K. Chakravarthy	Tamil
1986	Agni Kanal	Pakkame Vaa	Mano	K. Chakravarthy	Tamil
1986	Sippikkul Muthu	Dharam sharanam Gacchami	S. P. Balasubrahmanyam	Illayaraja	Tamil
1986	Sippikkul Muthu	Pattu Chelai	S. P. Balasubrahmanyam	Illayaraja	Tamil
1986	Sippikkul Muthu	Raman Kathai	S. P. Balasubrahmanyam	Illayaraja	Tamil
1986	Sippikkul Muthu	Varam Thantha Saamikku (Sad)	S. P. Balasubrahmanyam	Illayaraja	Tamil
1986	Bete	Hathu Yenthu	Uma Ramanan	S. P. Balasubrahmanyam	Kannada
1986	Sundara Swapnagalu	Nagabeku Madhya Mavarga		Vijay Bhaskar	Kannada
1986	Sundara Swapnagalu	Kshamisi Naa Heladella	S. P. Balasubrahmanyam	Vijay Bhaskar	Kannada
1986	Yuvajanotsavam	Padaam Namukku Paddam	K. J. Yesudas	Raveendran	Malayalam
1987	Nayakudu (D)	Edo Teliyani	S. P. Balasubrahmanyam	Illayaraja	Telugu
1987	Nayakudu (D)	Chalaki Chinnadhi	S. P. Balasubrahmanyam	Illayaraja	Telugu
1987	Swayam Krushi	Manchi Vennela Ippudu		Ramesh Naidu	Telugu
1987	Swayam Krushi	Siggu Poobanthi	S. P. Balasubrahmanyam, S. Janaki	Ramesh Naidu	Telugu
1987	Gowthami	Poola Veluva Soode		S. P. Balasubrahmanyam	Telugu
1987	Gowthami	Kondameeda Kothini Dincha	S. P. Balasubrahmanyam	S. P. Balasubrahmanyam	Telugu
1987	Gowthami	Nuluvechani Vennela	S. P. Balasubrahmanyam	S. P. Balasubrahmanyam	Telugu
1987	Rendu Thokala Pitta	Swathanthraani	S. P. Balasubrahmanyam	Illayaraja	Telugu
1987	Padamati Sandhya Ragam	Pibare Ramarasam	S. P. Balasubrahmanyam	S. P. Balasubrahmanyam	Telugu
1987	Collector Gari Abbai	Sannayi Vayinchu Bava	Mano, P. Susheela	K. Chakravarthy	Telugu
1987	Sankeerthana	Vanda Roopayalu Notu		Illayaraja	Telugu
1987	Lawyer Suhasini	Maharaja	S. P. Balasubrahmanyam	S. P. Balasubrahmanyam	Telugu
1987	Lawyer Suhasini	Tholisari	S. P. Balasubrahmanyam	S. P. Balasubrahmanyam	Telugu
1987	Lawyer Suhasini	Saamajavaragamana	S. P. Balasubrahmanyam	S. P. Balasubrahmanyam	Telugu
1987	Lawyer Suhasini	levamma Nidra Chalinchi'	S. P. Balasubrahmanyam	S. P. Balasubrahmanyam	Telugu
1987	Allari Krishnayya	Neeku Naaku Dosti	S. P. Balasubrahmanyam	K. Chakravarthy	Telugu
1987	Mouna Ragam	Tadi Tadi Thapane	S. P. Balasubrahmanyam	Illayaraja	Telugu
1987	Bhargava Ramudu	Kalame Thalamai	S. Janaki	K. Chakravarthy	Telugu
1987	Dabbevariki Chedu	Ettuku Pai Ettu Vey	S. P. Balasubrahmanyam P. Susheela, Madhavapeddi Ramesh	S.Vasu rao	Telugu
1987	Donga Mogudu	Addame	S. P. Balasubrahmanyam, P. Susheela	K. Chakravarthy	Telugu
1987	Trimurtulu	Bye Bye Bye	S. Janaki, P. Susheela, S. P. Balasubrahmanyam, Mano	Bappi Lahiri	Telugu
1987	Sruthilayalu	Saamajavara Gaamana (Mandolin Beat)		K. V. Mahadevan	Telugu
1987	Madana Gopaludu	Pramidala Aasala	Vani Jayaram	Sivaji Raja	Telugu
1987	Muddu Bidda	Chitti Potti	S. P. Balasubrahmanyam, P. Susheela	K. V. Mahadevan	Telugu
1987	Kedi	Koo Koo Koyile	S. P. Balasubrahmanyam	Illayaraja	Telugu
1987	Patnam Vacchina Monagadu	Naadira Nee Pranam		Illayaraja	Telugu
1987	Patnam Vacchina Monagadu	Kshanam Kshanam Okka Kadhalo	S. P. Balasubrahmanyam	Illayaraja	Telugu
1987	Patnam Vacchina Monagadu	Ra Raa Raa Raja Raa	Mano	Illayaraja	Telugu
1987	Poovizhi Vasalile	Pattu Engae	Malaysia Vasudevan	Illayaraja	Tamil
1987	Dhoorathu Pachai	Ithu Varaiyil	Krishna chandran	Illayaraja	Tamil
1987	Chinna Thambi Periya Thambi	Ya ya	K. S. Chitra	Illayaraja	Tamil
1987	Theertha Karaiyinile	Theychu		Illayaraja	Tamil
1987	Anbulla Appa	Aththaikku Pirantha	K. J. Yesudas	Shankar-Ganesh	Tamil
1987	Anbulla Appa	Idhu Paal Vadiyum	K. J. Yesudas	Shankar-Ganesh	Tamil
1987	Anbulla Appa	Anbulla Appa Ennappa	S. P. Balasubrahmanyam	Shankar-Ganesh	Tamil
1987	Anjatha Singam	Muzhanguthu Guitar	Malaysia Vasudevan	Shankar-Ganesh	Tamil
1987	Raja Mariyadhai	Pada Pada En Paranthathu	S. P. Balasubrahmanyam	Shankar-Ganesh	Tamil
1987	Raja Mariyadhai	Naanthane Disco Shanthi	Vani Jayaram	Shankar-Ganesh	Tamil
1987	Chinna Poove Mella Pesu	Thottaidam	S. P. Balasubrahmanyam	S.A. Rajkumar	Tamil
1987	Chinna Poove Mella Pesu	Vangadi Vangadi	Malaysia Vasudevan	S.A. Rajkumar	Tamil
1987	Thangachi	Ye Kuruvi Poongkuruvi	S. P. Balasubrahmanyam, Sunandha	S.A. Rajkumar	Tamil
1987	Rayilukku Neramachu	Aatha Kungumakari		S.A. Rajkumar	Tamil
1987	Rayilukku Neramachu	Aathangarai Thoppukulla	Malaysia Vasudevan	S.A. Rajkumar	Tamil
1987	Velicham	Manmadha Rojave	S. P. Balasubrahmanyam	Manoj-Gyan	Tamil
1987	Parisam Pottachu	Ponna Porantha	S. P. Balasubrahmanyam	Manoj-Gyan	Tamil
1987	Ini Oru Sudhanthiram	Solla Vallayo	K. S. Chitra	Gangai Amaran	Tamil
1987	Sankar Guru	Kakki sattai	Malaysia Vasudevan	Chandrabose (Composer)	Tamil
1987	Manithan	Kaalai Kaalai	S. P. Balasubrahmanyam	Chandrabose (Composer)	Tamil
1987	Michael Raj	Jothilingam		Chandrabose (Composer)	Tamil
1987	Aval Mella Sirithal	Mangala Kungum	P. Jayachandran	Gangai Amaran	Tamil
1987	Veerapandiyan	Thavum Kiliye	Malaysia Vasudevan	Shankar-Ganesh	Tamil
1987	Thulasi	Anbe Idhu Kadhal	S. P. Balasubrahmanyam	Sampath Selvam	Tamil
1987	Velaikkaran (1987 film)	Thotathile Paathi	S. P. Balasubrahmanyam, Saibaba	Illayaraja	Tamil
1987	Anand (1987 film)	I Want Tell You Something	S. P. Balasubrahmanyam	Illayaraja	Tamil
1987	Sowbhagya Lakshmi	Innu Innu Noduvase	S. P. Balasubrahmanyam	S. P. Balasubrahmanyam	Kannada
1987	Sowbhagya Lakshmi	Hosa Kanasu Chiguri Manadali	S. P. Balasubrahmanyam	S. P. Balasubrahmanyam	Kannada
1987	Sowbhagya Lakshmi	Baalalli Jyothiyu	Vani Jayaram	S. P. Balasubrahmanyam	Kannada
1987	Vaiki Odunna Vandi	Swapnangal Seemantha	P. Jayachandran	Raveendran	Malayalam
1988	Donga Kollu	Ravvoyi Maa Intiki	Mano	S.Vasu Rao	Telugu
1988	Donga Kollu	Ayyayyo Ee Samasaram		S. Vasu Rao	Telugu
1988	Raktabhishekam	Jata Kata	Mano	Illayaraja	Telugu
1988	Nenu Mee Vaadine	Premante	S. P. Balasubrahmanyam	K. Bhagyaraj	Telugu
1988	Nenu Mee Vaadine	Idhi Sandhela Ratri		K. Bhagyaraj	Telugu
1988	Nenu Mee Vaadine	Prema Devuni	S. P. Balasubrahmanyam	K. Bhagyaraj	Telugu
1988	Varasudochadu	Paachi Pala	K.S. Chitra	Illayaraja	Telugu
1988	Swarna Kamalam	Natarajane		Illayaraja	Telugu
1988	Swarna Kamalam	Cheri Yasodaku		Illayaraja	Telugu
1988	Brahma Puthrudu	Ammayi Mukku	S. P. Balasubrahmanyam	K. Chakravarthy	Telugu
1988	Sri Kanaka Mahalakshmi Recording Dance Troupe	Kalala	S. P. Balasubrahmanyam	Illayaraja	Telugu
1988	Vivaha Bhojanambu	Prema Rekaa Vipindhi	S. P. Balasubrahmanyam	S. P. Balasubrahmanyam	Telugu
1988	Sister Nandini	Addhari Needhi	Mano	Illayaraja	Telugu
1988	Rudra Veena	Randi Randi	Mano	Illayaraja	Telugu
1988	Bhama Kalapam	Kavitha O Kavitha	S. P. Balasubrahmanyam	S.Vasu rao	Telugu
1988	Samsaram	O Tappa Thagina	S. P. Balasubrahmanyam, G. Anand	Raj-Koti	Telugu
1988	Nuvve Naa Srimathi	Gorakanti Chinnoda	Madhavapeddi Ramesh	Illayaraja	Telugu
1988	Mugguru Kodukulu	Thokategina Galipatam		K. Chakravarthy	Telugu
1988	Mugguru Kodukulu	Samasarame Brindavanam	S. P. Balasubrahmanyam	K. Chakravarthy	Telugu
1988	Bava Marudula Saval	Vasanthala Vakililo	K. J. Yesudas, V. Ramakrishna, Vani Jayaram, Madhavapeddi Ramesh	Sivaji Raja	Telugu
1988	Police Dairy	Vacchadu Aggipidugu	S. P. Balasubrahmanyam	Illayaraja	Telugu
1988	Soora Samhaaram	Vedhalam Vandhilrukuthu	Mano	Illayaraja	Tamil
1988	Poovum Puyalum	Manmathane		S. A. Rajkumar	Tamil
1988	Illam	Aadum Paambu	P. Jayachandran	Illayaraja	Tamil
1988	Enga Ooru Kavakkaran	Siruvani	Illayaraja, Sunanda	Illayaraja	Tamil
1988	Paarthal Pasu	Sinnamani Ponnumani		Illayaraja	Tamil
1988	Mappillai Sir	Ittajkaru		Shankar-Ganesh	Tamil
1988	Sigappu Thali	Thillalangadi	S. P. Balasubrahmanyam	Shankar-Ganesh	Tamil
1988	En Thangachi Padichava	Maamanu Solla Oru Aalu	P. Susheela, P. Jayachandran	Gangai Amaran	Tamil
1988	En Thangachi Padichava	Summa Summa Ena Pattu	Malaysia Vasudevan	Gangai Amaran	Tamil
1988	Adhu Antha Kaalam	Annaiye Annaiye	Vanitha	Chandrabose (Composer)	Tamil
1988	Kai Naattu	Ada Nee	Malaysia Vasudevan	Chandrabose (Composer)	Tamil
1988	Kaliyugam	Anbe Yosi		Chandrabose (Composer)	Tamil
1988	Thaimel Aanai	Sangu Chakra Sami	Malaysia Vasudevan	Chandrabose (Composer)	Tamil
1988	Thaimel Aanai	Poona Poora Vittitu'	Malaysia Vasudevan	Chandrabose (Composer)	Tamil
1988	Thaimel Aanai	Poona Poora (Reprise)	Malaysia Vasudevan	Chandrabose (Composer)	Tamil
1988	Kalicharan	Gramuthula	Mano	Chandrabose (Composer)	Tamil
1988	En Vazhi Thani Vazhi	Mama Azhagu		Chandrabose (Composer)	Tamil
1988	En Vazhi Thani Vazhi	Dhaayam Podu		Chandrabose (Composer)	Tamil
1988	Nallavan	Ullathil Ondru		Chandrabose (Composer)	Tamil
1988	Kazhugumalai Kallan	Kalyaana Poonu	Malaysia Vasudevan	Chandrabose (Composer)	Tamil
1988	Vasanthi	Murungaka		Chandrabose (Composer)	Tamil
1988	Paravaigal Palavitham	Yaar Endru	Malaysia Vasudevan	S.A. Rajkumar	Tamil
1988	Nethiyadi	Naan Unakku Paattu Onnu	P. Jayachandran	Pandiarajan	Tamil
1988	Puthiya Vaanam	Mynaa Mynaa	S. P. Balasubrahmanyam, Sunanda	Hamsalekha	Tamil
1988	Puthiya Vaanam	Oore Kedithavane	S. P. Balasubrahmanyam	Hamsalekha	Tamil
1988	Thambi Thanga Kambi	Naan Paadinal Thirakkum		Gangai Amaran	Tamil
1988	Senthoora Poove	Keliye Ilangkiliye	Malaysia Vasudevan	Manoj-Gyan	Tamil
1988	Penmani Aval Kanmani	Aarambame Ippathanu	Malaysia Vasudevan, T. L. Maharajan	Shankar-Ganesh	Tamil
1988	Poovum Puyalum	Manmathane		S. A. Rajkumar	Tamil
1988	Ramanna Shamanna	Hosa Baga Udupu		S. P. Balasubrahmanyam	Kannada
1988	Ramanna Shamanna	Idu Yenu	S. P. Balasubrahmanyam	S. P. Balasubrahmanyam	Kannada
1988	Kakkothikkavile Appooppan Thaadikal	Kaakothiyammayikku	Janamma David, Malaysia Vasudevan	Ouseppachan	Malayalam
1988	Kakkothikkavile Appooppan Thaadikal	Nannangaadika	K. S. Chitra, Malaysia Vasudevan	Ouseppachan	Malayalam
1989	Shiva	Botany Pattam Undhi	S. P. Balasubrahmanyam	Illayaraja	Telugu
1989	Jayammu Nischayammu Raa	Ayyaayyo Rama		Raj-Koti	Telugu
1989	Suthradharulu	Jola Jolamma Jola		K.V. Mahadevan	Telugu
1989	Suthradharulu	Lalelo Lilela lo	S. P. Balasubrahmanyam	K.V. Mahadevan	Telugu
1989	Suthradharulu	Kalalendhku	S. P. Balasubrahmanyam	K.V. Mahadevan	Telugu
1989	Suthradharulu	Yopam Puspam Veda	S. P. Balasubrahmanyam	K.V. Mahadevan	Telugu
1989	Suthradharulu	Kolichananduku	S. P. Balasubrahmanyam	K.V. Mahadevan	Telugu
1989	Vichitra Sodharulu	Bujji Pellikoduki	S. P. Balasubrahmanyam	Illayaraja	Telugu
1989	Muddula Mavayya	Chukeshu Kochanuamma Choodu	S. P. Balasubrahmanyam	K.V. Mahadevan	Telugu
1989	Muddula Mavayya	Mavayya Anna Pilupu	S. P. Balasubrahmanyam, P. Susheela	K.V. Mahadevan	Telugu
1989	Bamma Maata Bangaru Baata	Chennapatnam	S. P. Balasubrahmanyam	Chandrabose (composer)	Telugu
1989	Bamma Maata Bangaru Baata	Salam Guddu Guddu	S. P. Balasubrahmanyam	Chandrabose (composer)	Telugu
1989	Sindhura Puvvu	Chilaka Raa Chilaka	Mano	Manoj Gyan	Telugu
1989	Sindhura Puvvu	Yetilona	Mano	Manoj Gyan	Telugu
1989	Sindhura Puvvu	Nenu Evaru Kottaru	Mano	Manoj Gyan	Telugu
1989	Prema	Ekkada Ekkada Pothavu Ra		Illayaraja	Telugu
1989	Preminchi Choodu	Kokamma	Mano	Raj-Koti	Telugu
1989	Gudachari 117	Tella Dorallu		K. Chakravarthy	Telugu
1989	Gudachari 117	Bang Bang		K. Chakravarthy	Telugu
1989	Gudachari 117	Devuda Chattuna Biddalu	S. P. Balasubrahmanyam	K. Chakravarthy	Telugu
1989	Gudachari 117	Poothotalo Poovirriku	S. P. Balasubrahmanyam, S. Janaki	K. Chakravarthy	Telugu
1989	Rajadhi Raja	Naa Thoti Potadithe	S. P. Balasubrahmanyam	Illayaraja	Telugu
1989	Maya Krishnudu	Ee Ragamo Ee Talamo	S. P. Balasubrahmanyam	Shankar-Ganesh	Telugu
1989	Rajadhi Raja	Vaa Vaa Manjal Malare	Mano	Illayaraja	Tamil
1989	Ore Oru Gramathiley	Padichu Ennatha	Illayaraja	Illayaraja	Tamil
1989	Enne Petha Raasa	Aasa Vacha Peraiyellam		Illayaraja	Tamil
1989	Enga Ooru Mappillai	Oorukkulla		Illayaraja	Tamil
1989	Pudhu Pudhu Arthangal	Ellorum Mavatta	S. P. Balasubrahmanyam	Illayaraja	Tamil
1989	Pick Pocket	Soodu Romba	Mano	Illayaraja	Tamil
1989	Pongi Varum Kaveri	Kattililla		Illayaraja	Tamil
1989	Thendral Sudum	Oru Raaja	K.S.Chitra	Illayaraja	Tamil
1989	Apoorva Sagodharargal	Puthu Maapillakku	S. P. Balasubrahmanyam	Illayaraja	Tamil
1989	Annakili Sonna Kathai	Naaval Pazhame	Mano	Chandrabose (Composer)	Tamil
1989	Pudhea Paadhai	Kannadicha	S. P. Balasubrahmanyam	Chandrabose (Composer)	Tamil
1989	Sonthakkaran	Ethala Kuthala Mathala	Malaysia Vasudevan	Chandrabose (Composer)	Tamil
1989	Sonthakkaran	Kodambakkam Virgambakkam	S. P. Balasubrahmanyam	Chandrabose (Composer)	Tamil
1989	Raja Chinna Roja	Super Staru Yaar	S. P. Balasubrahmanyam	Chandrabose (Composer)	Tamil
1989	Raja Chinna Roja	Ongappannukkum Pepe	S. P. Balasubrahmanyam	Chandrabose (Composer)	Tamil
1989	Athaimadi Methaiadi	Oh My Dear		S.R.Vasu	Tamil
1989	Moodu Manthiram	Vaanam Pesuma	Malaysia Vasudevan	Shankar-Ganesh	Tamil
1989	Naalai Manithan	Ye solai Pookkalae	Mano	Premi-Srini	Tamil
1989	Solaikuyil	Yerrikkarai Orathile	Gangai Amaran	M.S.Murari	Tamil
1989	Thangamani Rangamani	Vava	Malaysia Vasudevan	Shankar-Ganesh	Tamil
1989	Uthama Purushan	Vanga Kadal Idhu Vandhu Kulithidu		Shankar-Ganesh	Tamil
1990	Iddaru Iddare	Paisunna Papalendi	S. P. Balasubrahmanyam	Raj-Koti	Telugu
1990	Muddula Menalludu	Tataa Chepaloye	S. P. Balasubrahmanyam	K.V. Mahadevan	Telugu
1990	Jagadeka Veerudu Athiloka Sundari	Jai Chiranjeeva		Illayaraja	Telugu
1990	Kokila	Changu Chaka		Illayaraja	Telugu
1990	Prema Sasanam	Mallikave	S. P. Balasubrahmanyam	Illayaraja	Telugu
1990	Ramba Rambabu	Rambha Rambha	Mano	Madhavapeddi Suresh	Telugu
1990	Vishnu	Hello Come On Super Star	Mano	Raj-Koti	Telugu
1990	Arangetra Velai	Thai Ariyatha	Mano	Illayaraja	Tamil
1990	My Dear Marthandan	Kalyana Mapillaikku		Illayaraja	Tamil
1990	Puthu Paatu	Kutthalathil Thanni	Gangai Amaran	Illayaraja	Tamil
1990	Urudhi Mozhi	Dinaku Dinaku	S. Janaki	Illayaraja	Tamil
1990	Durga	Maari Muthu Maari		Shankar-Ganesh	Tamil
1990	Manaivi Oru Manickam	Rambai Thandi	Mano	Shankar-Ganesh	Tamil
1990	Vedikkai En Vadikkai	Maanamulla Roshamulla		Shankar-Ganesh	Tamil
1990	Nalla Kaalam Porandaachu	Chinna Kutty	Malaysia Vasudevan	Shankar-Ganesh	Tamil
1990	Aadi Velli	Gum Gum Guma	Mano	Shankar-Ganesh	Tamil
1990	Aadi Velli	Aayi Mahamayi		Shankar-Ganesh	Tamil
1990	Aadi Velli	Baama Thallipoma	Mano	Shankar-Ganesh	Tamil
1990	Aatha Naan Pass Ayittaen	Onna Renda Ava	Malaysia Vasudevan	Vidyasagar	Tamil
1990	Neengalum Herothan	Ezhu Ullagam Aandu Varum	Deepan Chakravarthy, S. N. Surendar	Gangai Amaran	Tamil
1990	Naanum Indha Ooruthan	Kayya Thooki		Shankar-Ganesh	Tamil
1990	Thangaikku Oru Thalattu	Aadi Paadum Azhagana	S. P. Balasubrahmanyam	Shankar-Ganesh	Tamil
1990	Periya Idathu Pillai	Unnai Patri Ezhuthum	S. P. Balasubrahmanyam	Chandrabose (Composer)	Tamil
1990	Pengal Veettin Kangal	Aambilaikku		Shankar-Ganesh	Tamil
1990	Pudhu Varisu	Andhathi Naan Paada	K.Prabhakar	Chandrabose (Composer)	Tamil
1990	Pudhu Varisu	Ayya Oh Oh		Chandrabose (Composer)	Tamil
1990	Pudhu Varisu	Kend Meena Kelathu Meena		Chandrabose (Composer)	Tamil
1991	Guna	Kammani Ee Permalekhale	S. P. Balasubrahmanyam	Illayaraja	Telugu
1991	Guna	Unna Nee Koruke		Illayaraja	Telugu
1991	Jaitra Yatra	Needalle Unna	S. P. Balasubrahmanyam	S. P. Balasubrahmanyam	Telugu
1991	Aditya 369	Jaanavule Nera Jaanavule	Jikki, S. P. Balasubrahmanyam	Illayaraja	Telugu
1991	Minor Raja	O Madana Sundara	Jikki, S. P. Balasubrahmanyam	Vidyasagar	Telugu
1991	Iddaru Pellala Muddula Police	Amma Naa muvvankkayo	P. Susheela	J. V. Raghavulu	Telugu
1991	Iddaru Pellala Muddula Police	Guddu Guddu Koncham	K.S.Chitra, S. P. Balasubrahmanyam	J. V. Raghavulu	Telugu
1991	Chaitanya	Kanne Lady		Illayaraja	Telugu
1991	Pelli Pusthakam	Krishnam Kalaya Sakhi	Rajeshwari	K.V. Mahadevan	Telugu
1991	People's Encounter	Ee Nela Manadhi Ra	S. P. Balasubrahmanyam	M. M. Keeravani	Telugu
1991	People's Encounter	Pindukunte Teepi	S. P. Balasubrahmanyam	M. M. Keeravani	Telugu
1991	Teneteega	Muddulu Kavala	Rajendra Prasad	Vidyasagar	Telugu
1991	Teneteega	Pala Bugga Medha		Vidyasagar	Telugu
1991	Talli Tandrulu	Vinavamma Vinavamma	Sujatha	K. Chakravarthy	Telugu
1991	Prema Khaidi	O Priya Priya	S. P. Balasubrahmanyam, P. Susheela, Ramola	Rajan-Nagendra	Telugu
1991	Yerra Mandaram	Randayya Jejelu	S. P. Balasubrahmanyam	K. Chakravarthy	Telugu
1991	Parishkaram	Chamanthi Chempalo	Mano	Vidyasagar	Telugu
1991	Prema Entha Madhuram	Aahaaa Maa Pellanta	S. P. Balasubrahmanyam, Madhavapeddi Ramesh, K.S. Chitra	Vidyasagar	Telugu
1991	Manitha Jaathi	Sellama		Illayaraja	Tamil
1991	Nallathai Naadu Kekum	Machchaanai Oram Katta		Shankar-Ganesh	Tamil
1991	Sendhoora Devi	Gangaimudhal		Shankar-Ganesh	Tamil
1991	Gnana Paravai	Maakku Naaku	S. P. Balasubrahmanyam	M.S. Viswanathan	Tamil
1991	Maanagara Kaaval	Thiruvarur Thangatheru		Chandrabose (Composer)	Tamil
1991	Maanagara Kaaval	Vandikaran Sontha Ooru	S. P. Balasubrahmanyam	Chandrabose (Composer)	Tamil
1991	Pondatti Sonna Kettukanum	Naanthaan		Chandrabose (Composer)	Tamil
1991	Naan Pudicha Mappillai	Kudumbam Oru Kovil	K. J. Yesudas	Chandrabose (Composer)	Tamil
1991	Sigaram	Jannalil		S. P. Balasubrahmanyam	Tamil
1991	Sigaram	Muthamma Ennai	S.N. Surender	S. P. Balasubrahmanyam	Tamil
1991	Sigaram	Petrathaithanai		S. P. Balasubrahmanyam	Tamil
1991	Sigaram	Vannam Konda	S. P. Balasubrahmanyam	S. P. Balasubrahmanyam	Tamil
1991	Thaiyalkaran	Otthaiya Naan	S. P. Balasubrahmanyam	S. P. Balasubrahmanyam	Tamil
1991	Marikozhundhu	Enakenna Kuraichal		Deva	Tamil
1991	Cheran Pandian	Ooru Vittu Ooru		Soundaryan	Tamil
1991	Kadhal Devathai	Jai chiranjeeva thisai		Illayaraja	Tamil
1991	Sir I Love You	Ae Indhira Puthirana	Malaysia Vasudevan	Illayaraja	Tamil
1992	Chakravyuham	Kougilene Korina		Illayaraja	Telugu
1992	Jamba Lakidi Pamba	Niluvara	Mano, Radhika	Raj-Koti	Telugu
1992	Pellaniki Premalekha Priyuraliki Subhalekha	Kattukunna Vade	K.S.Chitra	J. V. Raghavulu	Telugu
1992	Seetharatnam Gari Abbayi	Naa Mogude Brahmachari	P. Susheela	Raj-Koti	Telugu
1992	Appula Appa Rao	Rambha Ho	S. P. Balasubrahmanyam, Radhika, Malgudi Subha	Rajan-Nagendra	Telugu
1992	Gharana Raja	Nee Maatantene Aaro Vedham	Mano	Illayaraja	Telugu
1992	Gharana Raja	Pettane Pelliki Laggam	Mano	Illayaraja	Telugu
1992	Gharana Raja	Ichuko Teepi Muddu	Mano	Illayaraja	Telugu
1992	Gharana Raja	Kaalam Kaatesindhile	Mano	Illayaraja	Telugu
1992	Gharana Raja	Kasimeedha Vunnanolammi	Mano	Illayaraja	Telugu
1992	Lal Salaam	Thalelilliyalo	Warangal shankar	Vandemataram Srinivas	Telugu
1992	Yoddha (1992 film)	Kulu Kule	S. P. Balasubrahmanyam	A.R.Rahman	Telugu
1992	Chitram! Bhalare Vichitram!!	Mahasaya Mattuga	S. P. Balasubrahmanyam	Vidyasagar	Telugu
1992	Chitram! Bhalare Vichitram!!	Seethalu Erugani	K.S. Chitra	Vidyasagar	Telugu
1992	Teja	Shree Dhana Kanaka Tailaadi	S. P. Balasubrahmanyam	M. M. Keeravani	Telugu
1992	Thaali Kattiya Raasa	Kadhava thiranthu		S.A. Rajkumar	Tamil
1992	Oor Panchayathu	Kaatrum Poovum	S. P. Balasubrahmanyam	S. P. Balasubrahmanyam	Tamil
1992	Oor Panchayathu	Sithadai Kattikitu		S. P. Balasubrahmanyam	Tamil
1992	Sundara Kandam	Ithu Palli Kooda Vayasu	Giridharan	Deepak	Tamil
1992	Sundara Kandam	Vaa Vaa Pattu Paadalam	Mano	Deepak	Tamil
1992	Oor Mariyadhai	Pala Oalanguthu Thalathalanguthu	Swarnalatha	Deva	Tamil
1992	Naalaya Seidhi	Ponmalai Neram	Malgudi Subha	Adithyan	Tamil
1992	David Uncle	Thattungadi		Adithyan	Tamil
1992	Abhirami	Avasarama Romba		Mano Ranjan	Tamil
1992	Abhirami	Naam Irukkom		Mano Ranjan	Tamil
1993	Allari Prema	Edo Jariginadi	S. P. Balasubrahmanyam	Illayaraja	Telugu
1993	Allari Prema	Idi Mohale	S. P. Balasubrahmanyam	Illayaraja	Telugu
1993	Srinatha Kavi Sarvabhowmudu	Jejelu Jejelu		K.V. Mahadevan	Telugu
1993	Srinatha Kavi Sarvabhowmudu	Abba Oha Yabba		K.V. Mahadevan	Telugu
1993	Rowdy Annayya	Chilakamma Immandhi	Mano	Vidyasagar	Telugu
1993	Rowdy Annayya	Nuvvosthe Panduga	Mano	Vidyasagar	Telugu
1993	Rowdy Annayya	Dhim Dhinaka Dhim	S. P. Balasubrahmanyam	Vidyasagar	Telugu
1993	Bangaru Bullodu (1993 film)	Manasu Agadhu	S. P. Balasubrahmanyam	Raj-Koti	Telugu
1993	Kondapalli Raja	Guvvam Guddu Guddu Guvva	Mano	M. M. Keeravani	Telugu
1993	Mechanic Alludu	Gurva Gurva	S. P. Balasubrahmanyam	Raj-Koti	Telugu
1993	Evandi Aavida Vachindi	Hattukomanadhi Bhama	K.S.Chitra, Mano	Raj-Koti	Telugu
1993	Money (1993 film)	Ananaganaga	Jaya Sudha, K.S. Chitra, J. D. Chakravarthy	Sri (composer)	Telugu
1993	Rowdy Bullodu	Veede Chinnodu	S. P. Balasubrahmanyam	Illayaraja	Telugu
1993	Rowdy Bullodu	Yedukondallu Yekkeamu	Mano	Illayaraja	Telugu
1993	Thanga Pandi	Sugamana Kumariyo	S. P. Balasubrahmanyam	Raj-Koti	Tamil
1993	Thanga Pandi	Manasu Tharikkuthu	S. P. Balasubrahmanyam	Raj-Koti	Tamil
1994	Allarodu	Mee Amma	Rajendra Prasad	Vidyasagar	Telugu
1994	Maa Voori Maaraju	Abbayi Andalanni	S. P. Balasubrahmanyam, K.S.Chitra	Raj-Koti	Telugu
1994	Parugo Parugu	Bugga Bugga	Malgudi Subha	Raj-Koti	Telugu
1994	Jai Hind	Bodhai Yeri Pocchu	Suresh Peters	Vidyasagar	Tamil
1994	Subramaniya Swamy	Kadhal Kasanthidumo	Krishnaraj	Deva	Tamil
1994	Subramaniya Swamy	Sammina Namma	Gangai Amaran	Deva	Tamil
1994	Mettupatti Mirasu	Chinna Chinna	S. P. Balasubrahmanyam	M.S. Sriraj	Tamil
1994	Mettupatti Mirasu	Thotta Thanalae	S. P. Balasubrahmanyam	M.S. Sriraj	Tamil
1994	Thamarai	Mukka Marakka		Deva	Tamil
1995	Aadaalla Majaka	Missam Puttina	Vandemataram Srinivas	Vandemataram Srinivas	Telugu
1995	Vaddu Bava Thappu	Pidatha Meedha Pidata	Vandemataram Srinivas	Vidyasagar	Telugu
1995	Subha Sankalpam	Seethamma Andallu	S. P. Balasubrahmanyam, K. S. Chitra	M. M. Keeravani	Telugu
1995	Subha Sankalpam	Chinukulani Kalsi	S. P. Balasubrahmanyam	M. M. Keeravani	Telugu
1995	Subha Sankalpam	Moodu Mullu Esinaka	S. P. Balasubrahmanyam	M. M. Keeravani	Telugu
1995	Bhale Bullodu	Yesukora Nariga	K.S. Chitra	Koti	Telugu
1995	Amma Donga	Neetho Sayantram Entho	S. P. Balasubrahmanyam, K. S. Chitra	Koti,	Telugu
1995	Amma Donga	Edo Manasu Paddanu Kani	Mano, K.S. Chitra	Koti	Telugu
1995	Miss 420	Coca-Cola Coca-Cola	Mano	Sri (composer)	Telugu
1995	Pokiri Raja	O Erra Tholu Pilla	S. P. Balasubrahmanyam, K.S. Chitra	Raj-Koti	Telugu
1995	Puthiya Aatchi	Porakkumpothu Manishan	Mano	Premi-sreeni	Tamil
1995	Thotta Chinungi	Rajini Vara Bhavani	Shahul Hameed, Sujatha Mohan, Suresh Peters	Philip-Jerry	Tamil
1995	Villadhi Villain	Sarakku Sarakku	Arunmozhi, Suresh Peters	Vidyasagar	Tamil
1995	Ayudha Poojai	O Naa Ennanna Solvan	S. P. Balasubrahmanyam	Vidyasagar	Tamil
1995	Raja Enga Raja	Ooru vittu	Malaysia Vasudevan, Gangai Amaran	Illayaraja	Tamil
1996	Bhamane Satyabamane	Ruku Ruku Ruku	Kamal Hassan	Deva	Telugu
1996	Ladies Doctor	Ammoru Remix	Sindhu	Vidyasagar	Telugu
1996	Ooha	Chikkindi Chukkalloni	S. P. Balasubrahmanyam	J. V. Raghavulu	Telugu
1996	Prince	Cheekatimayam		Deva	Telugu
1996	Prince	Naanda Nandhana		Deva	Telugu
1996	Aruva Velu	Rohttu Pakkam		Adithyan	Tamil
1996	Vetri Vinayagar	Omkara Rupathil		M. S. Viswanathan	Tamil
1996	Naan Ungel Vettu Pillai	Pala Ula Kala Nila	S. P. Balasubrahmanyam	Koti	Tamil
1997	Chinnabbayi	Vinnapallu Vinavalle	S. P. Balasubrahmanyam	Illayaraja	Telugu
1997	Annamayya	Dachuko Nee Padalaku	S. P. Balasubrahmanyam	M. M. Keeravani	Telugu
1997	Annamayya	Antharayami	S. P. Balasubrahmanyam	M. M. Keeravani	Telugu
1997	Ramayanam	Ramayya raju avuthaduanta	Vani Jayaram	Madhavapeddi Suresh	Telugu
1997	College Galatta	Jaathi Malli	Unni Krishnan	Illayaraja	Tamil
1997	College Galatta	Therinchikko	Unni Krishnan	Illayaraja	Tamil
1998	Ulta Palta	Kashmirunundi Kanyakumari	Mano	M. M. Srilekha	Telugu
1998	Ulta Palta	Mustikala	Pranay	M. M. Srilekha	Telugu
1998	Jolly (D)	Mustabay Muddula Gumma	S. P. Charan	Kavi	Telugu
1998	Jolly	Otha Kallu Mookuthi	K.S. Chitra, Arunmozhi	Kavi	Tamil
1998	Veera Thalattu	Vaadipatti Kiliyapalo	Gangai Amaran	Illayaraja	Tamil
1998	Veera Thalattu	Amman Kovil	Gangai Amaran	Illayaraja	Tamil
1998	Calcutta	Appappa Satyam	Unni Krishnan	Mani Sharma	Tamil
1999	Pellante Idera	Maagha maasam	Mano, Parthasarthy, Sujatha	S. A. Rajkumar	Telugu
1999	Nagavamsam	Vinavamma Jabilamma		C. Ashwath	Telugu
1999	Nagavamsam	Sambarala Pongule		C. Ashwath	Telugu
1999	Nagavamsam	Andaala Naaraja		C. Ashwath	Telugu
1999	Nagavamsam	Ennallikennalu		C. Ashwath	Telugu
1999	Seetharama Raju	Kundanapu Bommaki	S. P. Balasubrahmanyam, M.M. Keeravani, Sujatha	M.M. Keeravani	Telugu
1999	Seetharama Raju	Emi Oyyi Nene	S. P. Balasubrahmanyam	M.M. Keeravani	Telugu
2000	Thenali (D)	Taalalatho Vaana	Parthasarthy, S.P. Balasubrahmanyam	A.R.Rahman	Telugu
2000	Thenali (D)	Ikkada Tadithe	S. P. Balasubrahmanyam	A.R.Rahman	Telugu
2000	Prema Savvadi	Sayyatade Satyabhamani		Illayaraja	Telugu
2000	Prema Savvadi	Jattu Katta Mannadi Chinnadi	Mano	Illayaraja	Telugu
2000	Raa Chilaka	Marule Pandi	Mano	Rajesh Roshan	Telugu
2000	Raa Chilaka	Jaajimalli Teegala	Mano	Rajesh Roshan	Telugu
2001	Paravasam	Nadiri Dinna	Shankar Mahadevan	A.R.Rahman	Telugu
2001	Mrugaraju	Aley Ley Aley	Udit Narayan	Mani Sharma	Telugu
2003	Satyame Sivam	Mouname Pataga	S. P. Balasubrahmanyam	Vidyasagar	Telugu
2003	Unnai Charanadaindhen	Kalluru Vazhvil		S. P. Balasubrahmanyam	Tamil
2004	Swarabhishekam	Okka Kshanam	S. P. Balasubrahmanyam	Vidyasagar	Telugu
2005	Mumbai Express (D)	Lera Addu	S. P. Balasubrahmanyam, Gopika Poornima	Illayaraja	Telugu
2008	Sundarakanda	Aaku Vakka	Sujatha	Vidyasagar	Telugu
2012	Mannaru	Ooraiyellam Kaaval	Krishnaraj	Udhayan	Tamil
2014	Ishq Wala Love (D)	Maye Marache	Harini, Gopika Poornima	Avinash-Vishwajeet	Telugu
2024	Praapthi	Monalisa		S. Mahesh Babu	Kannada
2024	Praapthi	Mareyalare		S. Mahesh Babu	Kannada

== Dubbing ==
Year	Film	Actress
1982	Patnam Vachina Pativrathalu	Radhika
1983	Prema Pichollu	Radhika
1983	Vasantha Kokila (Telugu Dubbed version)	Sridevi
1984	Gudachari No.1	Radhika
1987	Nayakudu (Telugu Dubbed version)	Saranya
1989	Mappillai (Tamil film)	Amala
1990	Doshi Nirdoshi	Lissy
1991	Guna (Telugu Dubbed version)	Rekha
1991	Teneteega	Rekha
1991	Aditya 369	Mohini
1995	Sashtri (Telugu Dubbed version)	Radhika
1996	Ramayanam	Smitha Madhav
1996	Ninne Pelladutha	Tabu
1996	Bhamane Satyabhamane	Heera
1997	Master	Sakshi Shivanand
1997	Mama Bagunnava	Mohini
1997	Sindhooram	Sanghavi
1998	Chandralekha	Isha Koppikar
1998	Aavida Maa Aavide	Tabu
1998	Sri Sita Ramula Kalyanam Chootamu Raarandi	Chandni
2000	Priyuralu Pilichindi (Telugu Dubbed Version)	Tabu
2000	Thenali (Telugu Dubbed Version)	Devayani
2001	Mrugaraju	Sanghavi
2001	Murari	Sonali Bendre
2001	Abhay (Telugu dubbed version)	Raveena Tandon
2002	Panchathanthiram (Telugu dubbed version)	Aishwarya

== Awards ==
- 1996 – Nandi Award for Best Female Playback Singer (Damn It Katha Addam Thirigindhi) (Television)
- 1995 – Nandi Award for Best Female Playback Singer (Subha Sankalpam)
