= Nangal Puthiyavargal =

- Directed by: R. G. Elavalagan
- Written by: R. G. Elavalagan
- Produced by: V. Kondian; C. Balamani; P. Kadhiravan
- Starring: Murali; Rekha; Chinni Jayanth; Chakravarthy
- Cinematography: R. H. Ashok
- Edited by: Lancy Mohan
- Music by: Chandrabose
- Production company: Moovender Movies
- Release date: 27 July 1990
- Running time: 117 minutes
- Country: India
- Language: Tamil

Nangal Puthiyavargal (transl. We Are New People) is a 1990 Indian Tamil-language drama film directed by R. G. Elavalagan. The film stars Murali, Rekha, Chinni Jayanth, and Chakravarthy. It was released on 27 July 1990.

== Cast ==
- Murali as Gowri
- Rekha as Bharathi
- Chinni Jayanth as Chandramohan
- Chakravarthy as Vidyasagar
- J. Lalitha as Lalitha
- MRK
- Oru Viral Krishna Rao
- Loose Mohan
- Joker Thulasi
- Omakuchi Narasimhan as Balamurugan
- Raja as Raja (Guest appearance)

== Production ==
Before making his directorial debut with Nangal Puthiyavargal, R. G. Elavalagan worked as an assistant director on several films, includingSankar Guru (1987) and Vettaiyaadu Vilaiyaadu (1989).

== Soundtrack ==
The music was composed by Chandrabose and the lyrics were written by Vairamuthu.

Track listing
No.	Title	Singer(s)	Length
1.	"Pattam Vaangi"	Malaysia Vasudevan
2.	"Nee Enbathu"	Mano, Lalitha Sagari
3.	"Naatta Kedukatheenga"	Malaysia Vasudevan
4.	"Unnai Santhithen"	K. J. Yesudas, Vani Jairam
5.	"Ennada Saami"	Mano

== Legacy ==
On Murali's death anniversary on 8 September 2022, a writer from Filmibeat noted that Nangal Puthiyavargal and Namma Ooru Poovatha (1990) contributed to establishing Murali's reputation in the Tamil film industry.

== Home media ==
The film was first telecast on Polimer TV on 16 May 2021 at 1:05 p.m. It was retelecast on the same channel on 28 September 2023 at 11:00 p.m.
