= Moodu Manthiram =

1989 film directed by Manobala

- Poster
- Directed by: Manobala
- Written by: P. Kalaimani
- Produced by: A. M. Ismail
- Starring: Prabhu; Rekha
- Cinematography: B. S. Lokanath
- Edited by: Raj Bhaskar
- Music by: Shankar–Ganesh
- Production company: Kaiser Creations
- Release date: 1 July 1989
- Country: India
- Language: Tamil

Moodu Manthiram (transl. Mumbo jumbo) is a 1989 Indian Tamil-language thriller film directed by Manobala and written by P. Kalaimani. The film stars Prabhu and Rekha. It was released on 1 July 1989, and failed at the box office.

== Plot ==
Dilip, a rich and arrogant man, gets into a conflict with the district collector, Kalpana. He successfully makes her believe in his love and marries her for revenge.

== Cast ==
- Prabhu as Dilip
- Rekha as Kalpana
- Nizhalgal Ravi
- Vennira Aadai Moorthy
- Janagaraj
- S. S. Chandran
- Senthamarai
- Malaysia Vasudevan
- Madhuri
- Kovai Sarala
- Disco Shanti
- Lalitha Kumari
- Charle
- Narasimhan

== Production ==
Moodu Manthiram was directed by Manobala and produced by A. M. Ismail under Kaiser Creations. Shooting took place in Ooty.

== Soundtrack ==
The soundtrack was composed by Shankar–Ganesh, and released under the label Nahata.

Track listing
No.	Title	Lyrics	Singer(s)	Length
1.	"Vizhiyoram"	Muthulingam	K. S. Chithra
2.	"Vaanam Pesuma"	Pulamaipithan	Mano, Uma Ramanan
3.	"Vaanam Pesuma" (version 2)	Pulamaipithan	Malaysia Vasudevan
4.	"Sevvai Thopporam"	Muthulingam	Durga
5.	"Singakutti Nanadi"	Muthulingam	S. P. Balasubrahmanyam
6.	"Vaanam Pesuma" (version 3)	Pulamaipithan	Malaysia Vasudevan, S. P. Sailaja
7.	"Instrumental Music"	—	—

== Release and reception ==
Moodu Manthiram was released on 1 July 1989, and failed commercially.
