= Kuttravali =

- Title card
- Directed by: L. Raja
- Produced by: K. Balaji
- Starring: Raghuvaran; Rekha; Charan Raj
- Music by: Chandrabose
- Production company: Sujatha Cine Arts
- Release date: 26 January 1989
- Country: India
- Language: Tamil

Kuttravali (transl. Criminal) is a 1989 Indian Tamil-language crime film directed by Raja, starring Raghuvaran, Rekha and Charan Raj . It is a remake of the 1988 Hindi film Kaal Chakra. The film was released on 26 January 1989.

== Cast ==
- Raghuvaran
- Rekha
- Charan Raj
- Nizhalgal Ravi
- Madhuri

== Soundtrack ==
The soundtrack was composed by Chandrabose.

Track listing
No.	Title	Singer(s)	Length
1.	"Vaazhthu Sollungal"	Mano, K. S. Chithra, Chorus
2.	"Endha Vazhi Povudhu"	M. S. Viswanathan
3.	"Manmadhan Vandhuvittan"	Ravindran, Sujatha Radhakrishnan
4.	"Nallathambi Kottaiyile"	Kovai Murali, Manorama
5.	"Myna Oru Myna"	S. P. Balasubrahmanyam, S. Janaki
6.	"Thangamani"	S. P. Balasubrahmanyam, Vani Jairam

== Release and reception ==
Kuttravali was released on 26 January 1989. The Indian Express wrote, "Kuttravali has all to do with murder (preferably on rainy nights), molestation (ditto) and mayhem, spiced with songs. A few good points linger".
