= Aval Mella Sirithal =

- Title card
- Directed by: M. N. Jai Sundar
- Written by: M. N. Jai Sundar
- Produced by: Nangavalli S. Paneer Selvam
- Starring: Murali; Seetha; Madhuri
- Cinematography: R. M. Subbu
- Edited by: T. Tirunavukkarasu
- Music by: Gangai Amaran
- Production company: Sri Kavitha Cine Arts
- Release date: 29 December 1987
- Country: India
- Language: Tamil

Aval Mella Sirithal (transl. She smiled gently) is a 1987 Indian Tamil-language drama film directed by M. N. Jai Sundar in his debut. The film stars Murali, Seetha and Madhuri. It was released on 29 December 1987.

== Cast ==
- Murali
- Seetha
- Madhuri
- Raveendran
- M. R. Krishnamurthy
- S. S. Chandran
- Chinni Jayanth
- Charle
- Devika Rani
- Babu Mohan
- Kallapetti Singaram
- Loose Mohan

== Production ==
Aval Mella Sirithal is the directorial debut of M. N. Jai Sundar. Scenes involving Murali, Seetha, Raveender and Madhuri were shot at places like Pulivalam and Mukkombu at Trichy.

== Soundtrack ==
The soundtrack was composed by Gangai Amaran, who also wrote the lyrics for all the songs. All the songs were recorded within two days at Prasad Studios.

Track listing
No.	Title	Singer(s)	Length
1.	"Mangala Kungum"	S. P. Sailaja, P. Jayachandran
2.	"Seetha Seetha"	Mano, K. S. Chithra
3.	"Aavaram Poovathan"	K. S. Chithra
4.	"Medai Meethu"	S. P. Balasubrahmanyam, K. S. Chithra
5.	"Degamengum"	Mano, K. S. Chithra

== Critical reception ==
The Indian Express wrote, "For a film that is a director's first, Aval Mella Sirithaal seemed, initially, to be passable. The action was staged with a degree of conviction. But slowly, and alas, surely, the film got mired in its contradictions and rhetoric, and the approach to the climax was nothing if not absurd."
