= Bhagavan (1986 film) =

1986 film directed by Baby

- Directed by: Baby
- Written by: Vijayan; Pappanamkodu Lakshmanan (dialogues)
- Screenplay by: Pappanamkodu Lakshmanan
- Produced by: K. G. Mohan
- Starring: Menaka; Madhuri; Meena Ganesh; Premji
- Cinematography: Somendu Roy
- Edited by: G. Murali
- Music by: M. S. Viswanathan
- Production company: Trident Arts
- Distributed by: Trident Arts
- Release date: 11 January 1986
- Country: India
- Language: Malayalam

Bhagavan is a 1986 Indian Malayalam film, directed by Baby and produced by K. G. Mohan. The film stars Menaka, Madhuri, Meena Ganesh and Premji in the lead roles. The film has musical score by M. S. Viswanathan.

== Cast ==
- Menaka
- Madhuri
- Meena Ganesh
- Premji
- Ramu
- Saleema
- Shanavas
- Sreenath
- Master Dax

== Soundtrack ==
The music was composed by M. S. Viswanathan and the lyrics were written by Poovachal Khader.

No.	Song	Singers	Lyrics	Length (m:ss)
1	"Mailanchikkaram"	S. Janaki, Chorus	Poovachal Khader	
2	"Malarmaari Madhumaari"	Vani Jairam, Krishnachandran	Poovachal Khader	
3	"Vigrahamalla Njaan"	Prof. Dr. T. Unnikrishnan	Poovachal Khader	
