= Parisam Pottachu =

- Title card
- Directed by: K. Shozharajan
- Written by: Es. N. Ravi
- Produced by: Perumal
- Starring: Pandiyan; Madhuri; Ranjini
- Cinematography: C. R. Santhanapandiyan
- Edited by: Rajakeerthi
- Music by: Manoj–Gyan
- Production company: Kalaimani Movies
- Release date: 18 September 1987
- Running time: 124 minutes
- Country: India
- Language: Tamil

Parisam Pottachu (/poʊtɑːtʃu/ transl. The gift was given) is a 1987 Indian Tamil-language film directed by K. Shozharajan and written by Es. N. Ravi. The film stars Pandiyan, Madhuri and Ranjini. It was released on 18 September 1987.

== Plot ==
A girl becomes insane after her lover drowns. Ramu, the son-in-law of the village VIP, has a soft spot for her. When he tries to find who is responsible for her pregnancy, she is shocked. Since Ramu's wife is barren, the insane girl becomes a surrogate mother but later drowns in the sea.

== Cast ==
- Pandiyan as Ramu
- Madhuri
- Ranjini as the insane girl
- Malaysia Vasudevan as the village VIP
- Karthik as Murali (guest appearance)
- S. S. Chandran
- Bheeman Raghu
- Senthil
- Kumarimuthu

== Production ==
C. Santhanapandiyan, son of minister C. Aranganayagam made his debut as cinematographer with this film.

== Soundtrack ==
The music was composed by Manoj–Gyan.

Track listing
No.	Title	Lyrics	Singer(s)	Length
1.	"Ponna Porantha"	Muthulingam	S. P. Balasubrahmanyam, S. P. Sailaja
2.	"Velli Kolusu"	Gangai Amaran	S. Janaki, Malaysia Vasudevan
3.	"Malarae Mullaanai"	Vairamuthu	S. Janaki
4.	"Oothunga Konjum"	Vaali	S. Janaki
5.	"Chithirai Poove"	Mu. Metha	P. Susheela, Vani Jairam

== Critical reception ==
The Indian Express wrote, "The story is utterly contrived. Songs, cabaret numbers and fights regularly dot the screenplay". Balumani of Anna praised the acting, humour, music, cinematography, story and direction.
