= Yemaatrathe Yemaaraathe =

- Title card
- Directed by: V. C. Guhanathan
- Written by: V. C. Guhanathan
- Produced by: Madakulam M. K. Dharmalingam; M. Natraja; Rajeshwari Chellaiah
- Starring: Vijayakanth; Archana; Anuradha; Vijayakumar; Sumithra; Nizhalgal Ravi
- Cinematography: Nagaraj
- Edited by: B. Krishnakumar
- Music by: Chandrabose
- Production companies: United Cine Technicians; Rajeswari Cine Creations
- Release date: 23 October 1985
- Country: India
- Language: Tamil

Yemaatrathe Yemaaraathe (transl. Do not cheat, do not be cheated) is a 1985 Indian Tamil-language action film directed by V. C. Guhanathan. The film stars Vijayakanth, Archana and Anuradha, with Vijayakumar, Sumithra and Nizhalgal Ravi in supporting roles. It was released on 23 October 1985.

== Cast ==
- Vijayakanth
- Archana
- Anuradha
- Vijayakumar
- Sumithra
- Suruli Rajan
- Nizhalgal Ravi

== Soundtrack ==
The soundtrack was composed by Chandrabose.

Track listing
No.	Title	Singer(s)	Length
1.	"Pudikkaiyile"	P. Jayachandran, S. P. Sailaja
2.	"Ila Maalai Nilavo"	S. P. Balasubrahmanyam, S. P. Sailaja & Chorus
3.	"Naana Vambukku"	T. M. Soundararajan & Chorus
4.	"Engal Thamizhinam"	Malaysia Vasudevan
5.	"Iru Kannil"	Malaysia Vasudevan, Vani Jairam

== Reception ==
Jayamanmadhan (a duo) of Kalki wrote that as the title says do not be cheated, they had nothing else to say.
