= Poovum Puyalum =

- Poster
- Directed by: S. A. Chandrasekhar
- Screenplay by: S. A. Chandrasekhar
- Story by: Madhampatty Sivakumar
- Produced by: Madhampatty Sivakumar
- Starring: Sivakumar; Charan Raj; Radhika
- Cinematography: Indu Chakravarthy
- Edited by: D. Shyam Mukherjee
- Music by: S. A. Rajkumar
- Production company: Semba Movies
- Release date: 10 March 1988
- Country: India
- Language: Tamil

Poovum Puyalum (transl. The flower and the storm) is a 1988 Indian Tamil-language film directed by S. A. Chandrasekhar and produced by Madhampatty Sivakumar, who also wrote the story. The film stars Sivakumar, Charan Raj and Radhika. It was released on 10 March 1988.

== Cast ==
- Sivakumar as Muthulingam
- Charan Raj as Vijay
- Radhika as Indhu
- Senthamarai
- Senthil
- Nassar
- Madhuri
- Vairam Krishnamoorthy
- Omakuchi Narasimhan
- Senji Krishnan
- S. Shankar as student (uncredited)
- Sathyan as boy in the song "Vaa Thambi"

== Production ==
The film was produced by Madampatti Sivakumar who also wrote the story. This was his first solo film as producer after Chinna Thambi Periya Thambi (1987). The film was launched at AVM Studios along with song recording with Sathyaraj gracing the event. The scene where Sivakumar marries Radhika was shot at Balaji Marriage Hall at T. Nagar, Chennai.

== Soundtrack ==
The soundtrack was composed by S. A. Rajkumar, who also wrote all the lyrics.

Track listing
No.	Title	Singer(s)	Length
1.	"Manmathane"	S. P. Sailaja
2.	"Thalattum"	S. A. Rajkumar
3.	"Vaa Thambi"	Malaysia Vasudevan, chorus
4.	"Vadathukku"	Uma Ramanan
5.	"Eruthe"	K. S. Chithra

== Critical reception ==
Jayamanmadhan (a duo) negatively reviewed the film for Kalki, panning Radhika's character's Tamil accent while also panning Senthil and Narasimhan's humour. The duo said the film is a must watch for people wanting to write a thesis on how to waste Radhika, Madhuri and Charan Raj's acting prowess while also finding the climax rushed.
