= Vasanthi (1988 film) =

- Poster
- Directed by: Chithralaya Gopu
- Written by: Chithralaya Gopu
- Starring: Mohan; Madhuri; Devilalitha
- Music by: Chandrabose
- Production company: AVM Productions
- Release date: 2 December 1988
- Country: India
- Language: Tamil

Vasanthi is a 1988 Indian Tamil-language film, directed by Chithralaya Gopu and produced by AVM Productions. The film stars Mohan, Madhuri, Devilalitha, Manorama, S. S. Chandran, Vinu Chakravarthy and Loose Mohan. The film's music was composed by Chandrabose. It is a remake of the 1955 Telugu film Donga Ramudu.

== Cast ==
- Mohan
- Madhuri
- Devilalitha
- Manorama
- S. S. Chandran
- Vinu Chakravarthy
- Loose Mohan
- Meena

== Production ==
The filming was completed in 30 days.

== Soundtrack ==
Soundtrack was composed by Chandrabose and lyrics were penned by Vairamuthu.

Song	Singers	Length
"Santosham Kaanada" – 1	K. J. Yesudas	03:39
"Vazhkaiyo Kaiyele"	S. P. Balasubrahmanyam	03:36
"Ku Ku Kulirudhu"	Vani Jairam	04.41
"Santosham Kaanada" – 2	K. S. Chitra	04:46
"Murungaka"	S. P. Sailaja	04:11
"Ravivarman"	K. J. Yesudas and K. S. Chitra	04:11

== Release and reception ==
Vasanthi was released on 2 December 1988. The Indian Express wrote, "Chitralaya Gopu [..] directs the film interspersing seriousness with humour". S. S. Chandran won the Cinema Express Award for Best Comedy Actor.
