= Kalicharan (1988 film) =

- Title card
- Directed by: L. Raja
- Written by: L. Raja; Vijay Krishnaraj (dialogues)
- Produced by: H. Murali
- Starring: Karthik; Sripriya; Gouthami; Madhuri; Charan Raj
- Cinematography: K. S. Selva
- Edited by: R. Vittal; C. Lancy
- Music by: Chandrabose
- Production company: Murali Cine Arts
- Release date: 2 December 1988
- Country: India
- Language: Tamil

Kalicharan is a 1988 Indian Tamil-language action film directed by L. Raja, starring Karthik, Sripriya, Gouthami, Madhuri and Charan Raj. It was released on 2 December 1988.

== Cast ==
- Karthik as Raja
- Gouthami as Gouthami
- Madhuri as Julie
- Charan Raj as Inspector Charan
- Jai Ganesh as Periya Dorai
- Anandaraj as Anandraj
- Sripriya
- Delhi Ganesh as DIG
- S. S. Chandran
- Vijay Krishnaraj
- Ra. Sankaran
- Chinni Jayanth
- Omakuchi Narasimhan
- S. N. Vasanth

== Production ==
The film was launched at AVM Studios along with song recording.

== Soundtrack ==
The soundtrack was composed by Chandrabose and lyrics by Vaali.

Track listing
No.	Title	Singer(s)	Length
1.	"Suriyare"	Malaysia Vasudevan
2.	"Vaanam Bhoomi"	Prabhakar, Sunanda, T. L. Thyagarajan
3.	"Oorukku Therinjachu"	Malaysia Vasudevan
4.	"Thodalam"	Prabhakar, Vani Jairam
5.	"Gramathula"	Mano, S. P. Sailaja

== Reception ==
P. S. S. of Kalki praised the acting of Charanraj, Chandrabose's music, Usilai Mani's humour and cinematography but panned S. S. Chandran's humour and Sripriya's characterisation.
