= Ullathil Nalla Ullam =

- Poster
- Directed by: Manivannan
- Screenplay by: Manivannan
- Story by: Shanmugapriyan
- Produced by: A. M. Varadarajan; Thiruppur K. Balu
- Starring: Vijayakanth; Radha; Radha Ravi; Madhuri
- Cinematography: A. Sabapathy
- Edited by: Gowthaman
- Music by: Gangai Amaran
- Production company: Ajantaa Creations
- Release date: 13 April 1988
- Running time: 135 minutes
- Country: India
- Language: Tamil

Ullathil Nalla Ullam (transl. The good heart) is a 1988 Tamil-language action film directed by Manivannan. The film stars Vijayakanth, Radha, Radha Ravi and Madhuri. It was released on 13 April 1988.

== Plot ==
The tragedy of the lead character is twofold, he is Don but is unhappy with his past and wants to turn a new leaf but cannot: the essence of the first tragedy is that there are two buts. The second is that despite being a crook by reputation, he is a goodhearted crook.

He falls in love with a police official. This girl breathes idealistic fire and not only does she vow to have him breathing the musty jail air but worse scorns his love. She heaps insult upon insult but he sticks to his guns. That his love for her is a firm as rock would itself have made her heart like illfrozen ice cream in the sun but he also turns up at the right moment and protects her honour that a gang of rapists was just about the foot.

The unkindest cut the type of violence that the film indulges in comes when she accuses her benefactor of having engineered the whole incident. When she learns the truth they join forces to settle scores with the villains, the don's associate and corrupt police chief.

== Cast ==
- Vijayakanth as Michael Raj
- Radha as Sheela
- Radha Ravi as Peter
- Madhuri as Lakshmi
- Vinu Chakravarthy as Police inspector
- Janagaraj as Michael Raj's father
- Charle as Gnanavel
- Senthil as Acolyte of Michael Raj
- Vijayan as Police commissioner
- Santhana Bharathi as Father
- Kamala Kamesh
- Disco Shanti

== Soundtrack ==
Soundtrack was composed by Gangai Amaran.

Track listing
No.	Title	Singer(s)	Length
1.	"Tholil Vizhum Maalaye"	S. P. Balasubrahmanyam, S. Janaki
2.	"Pottalum Erale"	S. P. Balasubrahmanyam
3.	"Naan Enna Pade"	S. P. Balasubrahmanyam, S. Janaki
4.	"Vettina Thappu Ille"	S. P. Balasubrahmanyam
5.	"Ponnupaakka Vareegala"	Malaysia Vasudevan

== Reception ==
The Indian Express wrote, "One of the faults of the film is that it drags on and on [..] Manivannan's direction has few stylish touches but he makes up for this lapse by a great deal of crudity". Jayamanmadhan of Kalki felt various actors such as Vijayan, Madhuri, Kamala Kamesh and Janagaraj were wasted, and that Sabapathy's cinematography overshadowed Manivannan's direction.
