= Kai Naattu =

- Film poster
- Directed by: V. C. Guhanathan
- Written by: V. C. Guhanathan
- Produced by: D. Ramanaidu
- Starring: Raghuvaran; Shantipriya; Mucherla Aruna
- Cinematography: Dharma
- Edited by: R. T. Annadurai
- Music by: Chandrabose
- Production company: Suresh Productions
- Release date: 24 June 1988
- Running time: 130 minutes
- Country: India
- Language: Tamil

Kai Naattu is a 1988 Indian Tamil-language film directed by V. C. Guhanathan and produced by D. Ramanaidu, starring Raghuvaran, Shantipriya and Mucherla Aruna. It was released on 24 June 1988.

== Plot ==
Kai Naattu is the story of a goonda who always stands for justice. He had dreams to have a peaceful life, but society turned him into a goonda. His only pleasant memories are the times spent with his lady love.

== Cast ==
- Raghuvaran
- Shantipriya
- Mucherla Aruna
- Senthil
- Sudhakar
- Charle
- Madhuri
- Thilak

== Soundtrack ==
Soundtrack was composed by Chandrabose.

Track listing
No.	Title	Singer(s)	Length
1.	"Kovaila"	Malaysia Vasudevan
2.	"Oorengum Unnai"	Jayachandran, Vani Jairam
3.	"Podu Podu"	Malaysia Vasudevan
4.	"Moottaipoochi"	Malaysia Vasudevan, Soundararajan
5.	"Ada Nee"	Malaysia Vasudevan, S. P. Sailaja
