= Kazhugumalai Kallan =

- Directed by: Rajasekhar
- Produced by: Rama Narayanan; Vijaya Lakshmi
- Starring: Charan Raj; Rekha
- Music by: Chandrabose
- Production company: Karpaga Vinayaga Film Circuit
- Release date: 23 March 1988
- Country: India
- Language: Tamil

Kazhugumalai Kallan (pronounced [kaɻuɡumalaɪkkːaɭɭːan] transl. The Dacoit of Kalugumalai) is a 1988 Indian Tamil-language action film directed by Rajasekhar. The film stars Charan Raj and Rekha. It was released on 23 March 1988.

== Cast ==
- Charan Raj
- Rekha
- Disco Shanti
- Sathyaraj
- Radha Ravi
- Nalini
- Marthandan as Amavasa

== Production ==
The filming was held at Mettupalayam, Coimbatore, Ooty, Coonnoor and Mudumalai forests and Hogenakkal. During the shoot at Covoor, Charanraj got hurt during the scene where he was supposed to carry an eagle on his shoulders.

== Soundtrack ==
The soundtrack was composed by Chandrabose, with lyrics by Vaali. This is the feature film debut for Prabhakar, a devotional singer.

Track listing
No.	Title	Singer(s)	Length
1.	"Uchimalayil Ooriruka"	Mano, Vani Jairam	4:28
2.	"Kaatiputtan Thanidhan"	Malaysia Vasudevan	4:01
3.	"Nanbargale Nanbargale"	Prabhakar	4:34
4.	"Kalyaana Ponnu"	Malaysia Vasudevan, S. P. Sailaja	4:22
5.	"Oorpesum Ulagam Pesum"	Malaysia Vasudevan	3:56
Total length:			21:21

== Reception ==
Jayamanmadhan of Kalki appreciated the film for being a return to form for director Rajasekhar after a long time. The Indian Express wrote, "The idea that was latent in the plot [...] is not exploited well by the director", adding, It's only Rekha [...] who puts some effort and feeling and some expression into her role.
