= Sathyan (Tamil actor) =

Indian Tamil actor and comedian

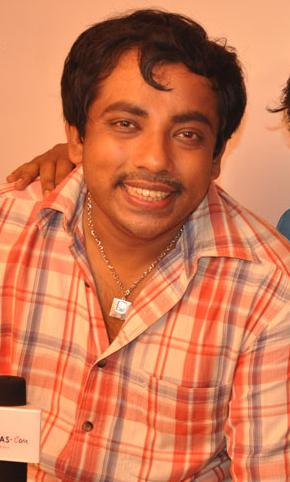
- Born: 11 June 1975 (age 51)
- Occupations: Actor, comedian
- Years active: 1987–present
- Father: Madhampatty Sivakumar
- Relatives: Sathyaraj (uncle); Sibiraj (cousin)

Sathyan Sivakumar known mononymously as Sathyan, is an Indian actor and comedian who works in Tamil cinema. He is the only son of veteran producer Madhampatty Sivakumar. Making his debut as a junior artist in the movie Poovum Puyalum and as the lead in Ilaiyavan, he has subsequently been appearing mainly in supporting and comedic roles in over sixty Tamil films.

== Early life ==
Sathyan was born to film producer Mathampatti Sivakumar. Actor Sathyaraj is his uncle, while Sibiraj is his cousin. Sathyan studied at PSG College of Arts and Science in Coimbatore. After graduating with a BBM degree, he entered the film industry by playing the lead role in the Ilaiyaraaja musical Ilaiyavan, which was produced by his father himself. He then acted in Kanna Unnai Thedukiren, both of these films which featured him in lead role failed at box-office and Sathyan chose to portray comedy roles. He later appeared in a pivotal role in Maayavi (2005), where he worked alongside Suriya and Jyothika.

After a series of small supporting roles, he received another break portraying the role of Srivatsan in Shankar's Nanban (2012) and then featured alongside Vijay again in a pivotal role in A R Murugadoss's Thuppakki. He featured as one of the four main leads in boy-adventure films Onbadhule Guru (2013) and Naveena Saraswathi Sabatham (2013), while also starring in the commercially successful romantic comedy, Raja Rani (2013).

== Filmography ==
Actor

List of Sathyan film credits as actor
Year	Title	Role	Notes
1987	Chinna Thambi Periya Thambi	Informer of bride's father	Special appearance
1988	Poovum Puyalum	Boy	Special appearance in the song "Vaa Thambi"
1998	Kaadhale Nimmadhi	Akash	
2000	Ilaiyavan	Bharathi	
2001	Kanna Unnai Thedukiren	Prakash	
2002	Mutham	Pazhani	
2003	Boys	Dheepu	
2004	Kovil	Shakthivel's friend	
2004	Jai	College Student	
2004	Arul	Senthil	
2004	Manmadhan	Inspector Shakthi	
2004	Maha Nadigan		
2005	Devathayai Kanden		
2005	Maayavi	Sathyaraj	
2005	February 14	Arvind Swamy	
2005	Oru Naal Oru Kanavu	Kumara	
2005	Ghajini	Server / Fake Sanjay	
2005	Aaru	Kailash	Uncredited role
2006	Paramasivan	Police	
2006	Thirupathi	Thirupathi's friend	
2006	Vathiyar	Easwara Pandian's sidekick	
2006	Vallavan	Subbu	
2007	Aalwar	Ponds's friend	
2007	Viyabari	Ad Film Model	
2007	Kireedam	Sakthivel's friend	
2007	Mudhal Mudhalai		
2007	Azhagiya Tamil Magan	Gopi	
2008	Velli Thirai	Thirupathi	
2008	Santosh Subramaniam	Muthu	
2008	Aegan	Mani	
2009	A Aa E Ee	Elango's friend	
2009	Siva Manasula Sakthi	Shanmugam	
2009	Solla Solla Inikkum	Sathyan	
2009	Aadhavan	Murugan	
2009	Palaivana Solai	Aadhi	
2009	Sirithal Rasipen	Purushothaman	
2009	Vettaikaaran	Sugu	
2010	Porkkalam	Sathya	
2010	Rasikkum Seemane	Nandhu's associate	
2010	Theeradha Vilaiyattu Pillai	Vishnu	
2010	Thillalangadi	Dass	
2010	Vallakottai	Giri	
2011	Maapillai	Chinna's friend	
2011	Konjam Sirippu Konjam Kobam		
2011	Kasethan Kadavulada		
2011	Vellore Maavattam		
2011	Raa Raa		
2011	Rowthiram	P.Ramanujam	
2011	Yuvan Yuvathi	Chacha	
2012	Nanban	Srivatsan (Silencer)	
2012	Sinam	Sathya	
2012	Thuppakki	Balaji	
2013	Onbadhule Guru	Ranga	
2013	Kantha	Thamizh	
2013	Moondru Per Moondru Kadal		
2013	Thillu Mullu	Sathyan	
2013	Raja Rani	Iyappan	Tamil Nadu State Film Award for Best Comedian
2013	Naiyaandi	Paraman	
2013	Naveena Saraswathi Sabatham	Gopi	
2015	Puli	Sama	
2016	24	Saravanan	
2016	Wagah	Pazhani	
2017	Mersal	Maniya	
2017	Theeran Adhigaaram Ondru	Theeran's friend	
2017	Kalavaadiya Pozhuthugal	Radha	
2018	Thaanaa Serndha Koottam	Muthukrishnan	
2018	Gulaebaghavali	Mayilvakanam	
2019	Raatchasi	PT Master	
2019	Petromax	Nandha	
2019	Capmaari	J.D	
2020	Bheeshma	Parimal's Boss	Telugu film
2021	Iruvar Ullam		
2021	Annaatthe	Azhagudurai	Guest Appearance
2022	Radhe Shyam	Anand Rajput's assistant	Telugu and Hindi film
2022	Bestie		
2023	Ariyavan		
2023	Ghosty	Mayil	
2023	Jigarthanda DoubleX	Durai Pandian	
2025	Kooran	Manohar	
2026	Sweety Naughty Crazy	Nandini's husband	
2026	Sattendru Maarudhu Vaanilai	IT Manager	
2026	Hi	Yogendran	
2026	Sandakari	Kunjumani	

Dubbing artist

List of Sathyan film credits as a dubbing artist
Year	Film	Role	Notes
2019	Frozen II	Olaf	Tamil dubbed version

Playback singer

List of Sathyan film credits as a playback singer
Year	Film	Song	Composer	Notes
2015	Touring Talkies	"Touring Talkies"	Ilaiyaraaja	Spoke the dialogues in the song
