= Rayilukku Neramachu =

- Title card
- Directed by: Bharathi Mohan
- Written by: Bharathi Mohan
- Produced by: Santha Chandrasekaran
- Starring: Ramarajan; Nishanthi; Pandiyan; Madhuri
- Cinematography: P. Ganesapandiyan
- Edited by: S. S. Nazir
- Music by: S. A. Rajkumar
- Production company: Sri Shanthalaya
- Release date: 27 May 1988
- Country: India
- Language: Tamil

Rayilukku Neramachu (transl. Time for the train) is a 1988 Indian Tamil-language film written and directed by Bharathi Mohan. The film stars Ramarajan and Nishanthi. It was released on 27 May 1988.

== Plot ==
Manikkam attends a wedding in his village with his relatives and tries to help a woman in need. Problems arise when that woman informs everyone that she is his wife. Shocked, Manikkam questions the woman for lying about being his wife, and she reveals herself as Chellakili who hails from another village. She and Kuyili were best friends there. Kuyili fell in love with Pandiyan who joined as an administrative officer for the temple. Pandiyan finds out about the fraudulent activities done by Vinu Chakravarthy in temple and gets him arrested. Vinu Chakravarthy who swears revenge sexually harasses Kuyili and kills Pandiyan. Vinu who set his eyes on Chellakili who is his wife's sister decides to marry her. Chellakili who is not interested to marry runs away from home. After hearing the flashback, Manikkam decides to protect her and in the process both fall in love. Manikkam's father who is initially against their love later relents and asks for Vinu's permission fora marriage proposal who refuses and insults them and again conducts a marriage between him and Chellakili. Both Manikkam and Chellakili try to elope and are chased by Vinu and his men. In the end, Vinu gets killed by Kuyili and Manikkam and Chellakili get united.

== Cast ==
- Ramarajan as Manikkam
- Nishanthi as Chellakili
- Pandiyan as Officer
- Madhuri as Kuyili
- S. S. Chandran
- V. K. Ramasamy
- Vinu Chakravarthy
- Manorama
- Gandhimathi
- Chinni Jayanth
- Thyagu
- Kumarimuthu
- Oru Viral Krishna Rao
- C. R. Saraswathi

== Soundtrack ==
The music was composed by S. A. Rajkumar who also wrote the lyrics.

Song	Singers
"Aatha Kungumakari"	S. P. Sailaja
"Aathangarai Thoppukulla"	Malaysia Vasudevan, S. P. Sailaja
"Devi Varuval"	Rajkumar Bharathi
"Poravale Ponnuthayi"	S. P. Balasubrahmanyam, Swarnalatha
"Poravalthan Ponnuthayi"	P. Susheela
"Raajaraagam"	S. P. Balasubrahmanyam, K. S. Chithra
"Thanni Eraikiyile"	Rajkumar Bharathi
"Yelai Malai Katru"	S. A. Rajkumar, Ramesh

== Reception ==
Jayamanmadhan of Kalki called it a routine rural story.
