= Madhuri (Tamil actress) =

Indian actress

- Born: Madhuri; 15 November 1967 (age 58); Madurai, Tamil Nadu
- Occupation: Actress
- Years active: 1984–1994

Madhuri is an Indian actress who performed in a number of Tamil-language and Malayalam-language films during the 1980s and early 1990s. She was one of the leading contemporary actresses of her time appearing in numerous performance-oriented Tamil films.

== Partial filmography ==
Year	Film	Role	Language	Notes
1984	Paavam Krooran		Malayalam	
1984	Paavam Kodooran		Tamil	
1985	Orikkal Oridathu		Malayalam	
1985	Alai Osai		Tamil	
1985	Boeing Boeing	Padma	Malayalam	
1985	Uyarum Njaan Naadaake	Uppatti	Malayalam	
1985	Nullinovikkaathe		Malayalam	
1985	Nerariyum Nerathu	Sharada	Malayalam	
1985	Manicheppu Thurannappol		Malayalam	
1985	Shathru	Suma	Malayalam	
1985	Black Mail	Chembakam	Malayalam	
1985	Sannaaham	Rekha	Malayalam	
1986	Endravathu Oru Naal		Tamil	
1986	Ente Shabdam		Malayalam	
1986	Annai En Dheivam	Rukku	Tamil	
1986	Oppam Oppathinoppam	Devaki	Malayalam	
1986	Bhagavaan		Malayalam	
1986	Maruthi	Thangam	Tamil	
1986	Ardha Raathri		Malayalam	
1986	Samsaram Adhu Minsaram	Vasantha	Tamil	
1986	Palaivana Rojakkal	Shanthi	Tamil	
1986	Adutha Veedu	Jaya	Tamil	
1986	Kaliyuga Krishnudu	Lakshmi	Telugu	
1987	Manithan	Indra	Tamil	
1987	Velicham		Tamil	
1987	Megam Karuththirukku		Tamil	
1987	Ore Raththam		Tamil	
1987	Nalla Pambu		Tamil	
1987	Michael Raj		Tamil	
1987	Kavalan Avan Kovalan	Anjalai	Tamil	
1987	Evargal Indiyargal	Savitri	Tamil	
1987	Parisam Pottachu		Tamil	
1987	Paasam Oru Vesham		Tamil	
1987	Valayal Satham		Tamil	
1987	Shri Kanakamalaxmi Recording Dance Troupe	Sita	Telugu	
1988	Ullathil Nalla Ullam	Lakshmi	Tamil	
1988	Therkathi Kallan	Annakili	Tamil	
1988	Bheekaran		Malayalam	
1988	Agnichirakulla Thumpi		Malayalam	
1988	Thenpandi Seemayile		Tamil	
1988	Poovum Puyalum		Tamil	
1988	Aval Mella Sirithal		Tamil	
1988	Onnum Onnum Pathinonnu		Malayalam	
1988	Penmani Aval Kanmani	Meenakshi	Tamil	
1988	Kai Naattu		Tamil	
1988	Kuttravali		Tamil	
1988	Anbe En Anbe		Tamil	
1988	Kalicharan	Julie	Tamil	
1988	Irandil Ondru		Tamil	
1988	Soora Samhaaram	Arun's wife	Tamil	
1988	Vasanthi		Tamil	
1988	Manaivi Oru Mandhiri		Tamil	
1988	Rayilukku Neramachu		Tamil	
1988	Thappu Kanakku		Tamil	
1988	Manaivi Oru Mandhiri		Tamil	
1988	Thaimel Aanai	Vinod's wife	Tamil	
1988	Dhayam Onnu		Tamil	
1988	Sahadevan Mahadevan	Kaveri	Tamil	
1989	Radha Kadhal Varadha		Tamil	
1989	Sonthakkaran		Tamil	
1989	Siva		Tamil	
1989	Sakalakala Sammandhi	Saraswathy	Tamil	
1989	Samsarame Saranam		Tamil	
1989	Vettaiyaadu Vilaiyaadu		Tamil	
1989	Moodu Manthiram		Tamil	
1989	Manasukketha Maharasa		Tamil	
1990	En Veedu En Kanavar		Tamil	
1990	Kavalukku Kettikaran	Chella Kili	Tamil	
1990	Thangathin Thangam		Tamil	
1990	Aalay Pathu Malai Mathu		Tamil	
1990	Engal Swamy Ayyappan	Veni	Tamil	
1991	Pudhu Manithan	Lakshmi	Tamil	
1991	Raagam Anuraagam		Malayalam	
1992	Uyarndhavan		Tamil	
1994	Palleturi Mogudu		Telugu	
