= Adhu Antha Kaalam =

- Poster
- Directed by: Valampuri John
- Written by: Valampuri John
- Starring: Charan Raj; Lakshmi
- Music by: Chandrabose
- Production company: Bhanu Revathi Combines
- Release date: 1988
- Country: India
- Language: Tamil

Adhu Antha Kaalam (transl. That is the past) is a 1988 Indian Tamil-language political drama film directed by Valampuri John. The film stars Charan Raj and Lakshmi. It was a box office failure, and remains John's only directorial credit.

== Cast ==
- Charan Raj as the MLA
- Lakshmi as the MLA's wife
- S. S. Chandran as the MLA's assistant
- Senthamarai as the MLA's father-in-law
- Janagaraj as the graffiti writer

== Soundtrack ==
The soundtrack was composed by Chandrabose, with lyrics by Vairamuthu. The song "Azhagana Sandhangal" is set to Valaji, a Carnatic raga.

Track listing
No.	Title	Singer(s)	Length
1.	"Azhagana Sandhangal"	K. J. Yesudas, Vani Jairam	4:39
2.	"Pottuerukka Poovirukka"	K. J. Yesudas	4:31
3.	"Chinnachiru Vannakili"	S. P. Balasubrahmanyam, P. Susheela, K. J. Yesudas	4:41
4.	"Annaiye Annaiye"	Vani Jairam	4:40
5.	"Paatukku Na Paatteduppen"	Malaysia Vasudevan	5:52
Total length:			24:23

== Reception ==
N. Krishnaswamy of The Indian Express wrote, "Valampuri John's film plays badly till halftime .... sloppy cuts make the jumpy script unbearable".
