= Chandrabose (composer) =

Indian composer and singer

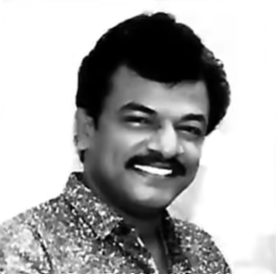

Background information
- Born: 11 July 1950
- Died: 30 September 2010 (aged 60)
- Years active: 1977–2010
- Formerly of: Devi Nataka Company, Boses-Deva toupee

Chandrabose (11 July 1950 – 30 September 2010) was an Indian composer and singer. He composed music for more than 300 films between 1977 and 1995. In 2007 he made his debut on the silver screen as an actor.

== Personal life ==
Chandrabose's son, Bose Santhosh, has also worked in films as a composer, working in the Malayalam film Sandwich (2011) and the Tamil films, Meenkothi and Deva Kumaran. He is married twice, since 2007 he started acting in Kalaignar TV serials.

== Career ==
Chandrabose began his career as child artist in the film Thaayum Magalum, he then started to concentrate on music by composing for stage plays of R. S. Manohar and Prameela drama group. His debut film as composer was Madhura Geetham (1977).

During the 1980s, he was the official composer of the AVM Productions, in particular the Tamil movies, some of which starred Rajini Kanth.

== Death ==
Chandrabose died at a hospital in Chennai on 30 September 2010. He had been suffering from cirrhosis of the liver for a number of issues.

== Filmography ==
=== Composer ===
Films

- Madhurageetham (1977)
- Mangudi Minor (1978)
- Machanai Paatheengala (1978)
- Tharayil Vaazhum Meengal (1979)
- Saranam Ayyappa (1980)
- Vadivangal (1981)
- Parvaiyin Marupakkam (1982)
- Paasa Madal (1982)
- Ithu Engal Rajyam (1984)
- Oru Malarin Payanam (1985)
- Rajathi Rojakili (1985)
- Yemaatrathe Yemaaraathe (1985)
- Thandanai (1985)
- Karaiyai Thodatha Alaigal (1985)
- Marumagal (1986)
- Viduthalai (1986)
- Shankar Guru (1987)
- Makkal En Pakkam (1987)
- Manithan (1987)
- Michael Raj (1987)
- Adhu Antha Kaalam (1988)
- Annanagar Mudhal Theru (1988)
- Kadarkarai Thaagam (1988)
- Kai Naattu (1988)
- Kaliyugam (1988)
- Kadhanayagan (1988)
- Thaimel Aanai (1988)
- Paatti Sollai Thattathe (1988)
- Kalicharan (1988)
- En Vazhi Thani Vazhi (1988)
- Nallavan (1988)
- Kazhugumalai Kallan (1988)
- Vasanthi (1988)
- Chinna Chinna Aasaigal (1989)
- Kuttravali (1989)
- Annakili Sonna Kathai (1989)
- Idhaya Deepam (1989)
- Oru Thottil Sabatham (1989)
- Pudhiya Paadhai(1989)
- Sonthakkaran (1989)
- Raja Chinna Roja (1989)
- Vaai Kozhuppu (1989)
- Vettaiyaadu Vilaiyaadu (1989)
- Periya Idathu Pillai (1990)
- Muthalaali Amma (1990)
- Nangal Puthiyavargal (1990)
- Maanagara Kaaval (1991)
- Aboorva Nanbargal (1991)
- Mudhal Kural (1991)
- Pondatti Sonna Kettukanum (1991)
- Naan Pudicha Maappillai (1991)
- Sugamana Sumaigal (1992)
- Ungal Anbu Thangachi (1993)
- Varavu Ettana Selavu Pathana (1994)
- Aval Potta Kolam (1995)
- Naan Petha Magane (1995)
- Sigamani Ramamani (2001)
- Aadhikkam (2005)

Private Albums

- 1998 "Vegam" – All Songs Penned by Gangai Amaran

Television

- 1997 Aachi International
- 1998 Nimmathi Ungal Choice I
- 1998 Nimmathi Ungal Choice II – Kannammavin Kadhai
- 1998 Oru Pennin Kadhai
- 1999 Galatta Kudumbam I
- 1999 Sontham
- 1999 Nimmathi Ungal Choice III – Thriveni Sangamam
- 1999 Galatta Kudumbam II – Galatta Sirippu
- 1999 Nimmathi Ungal Choice IV – Mavilai Thoranam
- 1999 Mangai
- 2001 Take It Easy Vaazhkai
- 2001 Adhipathi
- 2007 Porantha Veeda Puguntha Veeda

=== Singer ===
Year	Film	Songs	Composer	Notes
1978	Aarupushpangal	"Yendi Muthamma"	M. S. Viswanathan	
1978	Machaanai Patheengala	"Ada Kooruketta Pasangala"	Himself	
1979	Pancha Kalyani	"Raasa Vanthaandi Rosamulla"	Shyam	
1980	Madhavi VanthaaL	"Kadal Vazhum Meenai"	Himself	
1981	Avalukkul Oru Ragasiyam	"Madurai Veeran Sami"	Himself	
1981	Tharaiyil Vazhum Meengal	"Mazhaikaala Megam"	Himself	
1981	Tharaiyil Vazhum Meengal	"Azhagana Chinnakutti"	Himself	
1981	Thodarum Charithirangal	"Ellorum Ullasamai"	Himself	
1988	Oru Thottil Sabatham	"Poonchittu Kuruvigala"	Himself	
1989	Pen Buddhi Mun Buddhi	"Pen Buddhi", "Goluse"	Himself	
1997	Karuppu Roja	"Daaliya Poo"	M. S. V. Raja	
1998	Gol Maal	"Vaada Vaana"	Bala Bharathi	
2001	Sigamani Ramamani	"Thaaikulame"	himself	

== Filmography ==
=== As actor ===
Films

- Kathi Kappal (2008)

Television

- 2006–2007 Malargal (Sun TV) as Lingam
- 2008 Namma Kudumbam (Kalaignar TV)
- 2008 Jananam (Mega TV)
- 2008 - 2010 Megala (Sun TV)
- 2008–2009 Vairanenjam (Kalaignar TV) as Jagannadhan
- 2009–2010Thiruppavai (Sun TV)
- 2009–2010 Thangamana Purushan (Kalaignar TV)
