= Senthil filmography =

Filmography of Indian actor

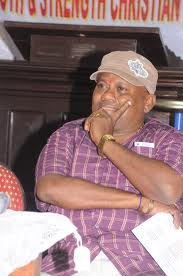
Senthil at wedding function

Senthil is an Indian comedian and an actor who appears mostly in Tamil films alongside few Telugu, Malayalam, and Hindi language films. He is especially known for his roles alongside Goundamani.

He ran away from his village at the age of 13 due to his father's fierce scoldings for his problems. He first worked in an oil mart, then in a private wine shop as a waiter and then ended up in drama where he started developing his skills.

He made his acting debut with the Tamil film Oru Koyil Iru Dheepangal of 1979 even though officially his first film was the Malayalam film Ithikkara Pakki, which was released in 1980. He slowly entered the Tamil film industry in small characters and finally landed a good role in the film Malaiyoor Mambattiyan. He has also acted in many popular films as comedian in the Tamil film industry. He usually appears in films with Goundamani in a slapstick double act. Together, they formed a comic pair in many Tamil films.

In 2019, Senthil has started acting in Tamil tele-serials making his debut with Sun TV's Rasaathi.

== Tamil films ==
=== 1970s ===
Year	Film	Role	Notes
1979	Oru Koyil Iru Dheepangal		
1979	Pasi	Aarumugam	

=== 1980s ===
Year	Film	Role	Notes
1980	Ilamai Kolam	Office watchman	
1981	Kilinjalgal		
1981	Mouna Geethangal		
1981	Aadugal Nanaigindrana		
1981	Indru Poi Naalai Vaa	Thug	
1982	Gopurangal Saivathillai		
1982	Theerpugal Thiruththapadalam		
1982	Archanai Pookal		
1982	Poi Satchi	Pandaram	
1982	Manjal Nila		
1982	Nijangal		
1982	Thooral Ninnu Pochchu	Karuppannai	
1982	Antha Rathirikku Satchi Illai		
1983	Ilamai Kaalangal		
1983	Saatchi		
1983	Marupatta Konangal		
1983	Aanandha Kummi		
1983	Saattai Illadha Pamparam		
1983	Bhagavathipuram Railway Gate		
1983	Malaiyoor Mambattiyan	Bullet	
1984	Nandri	Guest appearance	
1984	Thalayanai Mandhiram		
1984	Neram Nalla Neram	Roadside restaurant owner	
1984	Mansoru		
1984	Kuva Kuva Vaathugal		
1984	Ingeyum Oru Gangai		
1984	Manmatha Rajakkal		
1984	Madhurai Sooran		
1984	Komberi Mookan		
1984	24 Mani Neram	Sidekick	
1984	Naan Paadum Paadal	Laundryman	
1984	Nalla Naal		
1984	Aval Oru Madhiri		
1984	Aakhri Sangam		
1984	Sathyam Neeye		
1984	Vaidehi Kathirunthal	Komuti Thalaiya	
1984	January 1		
1984	Ambigai Neril Vanthaal		
1985	Rajathi Rojakili	Patta Sombu	
1985	Mannukketha Ponnu	Ammavasai	
1985	Prema Pasam		
1985	Pattuselai		
1985	Urimai	Ambulimama	
1985	Alai Osai		
1985	Kanni Rasi	Lakshmipathi's friend	
1985	Karaiyai Thodadha Alaigal		
1985	Avan		
1985	Udaya Geetham	Senthil	
1985	Anbin Mugavari		
1985	Hello Yaar Pesurathu		
1985	Geethanjali		
1985	Irandu Manam		
1985	Maruthani		
1985	Yaar?	Master	
1985	Vetrikani		
1985	Selvi		
1985	Naane Raja Naane Mandhiri	Naakuthuruthi	
1985	Aagaya Thamaraigal		
1985	Annee		
1985	Naan Sigappu Manithan	Senthil	
1985	Chithirame Chithirame		
1985	Nalla Thambi	Naidhu	
1985	Raja Yuvaraja		
1985	Arthamulla Aasaigal		
1985	Sivappu Nila		
1985	Thendral Thodatha Malar		
1985	Thiramai		
1985	Neethiyin Marupakkam		
1985	Vesham		
1986	Karimedu Karuvayan		
1986	Aayiram Kannudayaal		
1986	Vasantha Raagam	Chinnamalai	
1986	Badhil Solval Badrakali		
1986	December Pookal	Senthil Kumaran	
1986	Mella Thirandhathu Kadhavu	Auction assistant	
1986	Amman Kovil Kizhakale	Kathavarayan	
1986	Aayiram Pookkal Malarattum		
1986	Thazhuvatha Kaigal		
1986	Murattu Karangal		
1986	Anandha Kanneer	Barber	
1986	Uyire Unakkaga	Shoemaker	
1986	Unakkaagave Vaazhgiren	Pattukottai	
1986	Marakka Matten		
1986	Manthira Punnagai		
1986	Endravadhu Orunal		
1986	Enakku Nane Needipathi	Arivazhagan	
1986	Lakshmi Vandhachu	Renga	
1986	Vidinja Kalyanam	Balu's Friend	
1986	Kunguma Pottu		
1986	Maragatha Veenai	School clerk	
1986	Koyil Yaanai		
1986	Kanne Kaniyamuthe		
1986	Kalamellam Un Madiyil		
1986	Namma Ooru Nalla Ooru		
1986	Nilave Malare		
1986	Paaru Paaru Pattanam Paaru		
1986	Pookkalai Parikkathe		
1986	Natpu	Pathu Paisa	
1986	Dharma Pathini	Ponnusaami's sidekick	
1986	Pudhiya Poovidhu		
1986	Piranthaen Valarnthaen		
1986	Rasigan Oru Rasigai		
1986	Kodai Mazhai		
1986	Saadhanai		
1986	Oomai Vizhigal		
1986	Nambinar Keduvathillai		
1986	Mannukkul Vairam	Sembattai	
1987	Paadu Nilave	Thiri Vetti	
1987	Raja Mariyadhai	Watchman	
1987	Sirai Paravai		
1987	Solvadhellam Unmai	Geetha's husband	
1987	Poo Poova Poothirukku		
1987	Poo Mazhai Pozhiyuthu	Senthil	
1987	Parisam Pottachu		
1987	Ninaive Oru Sangeetham	Gundulingam	
1987	Nalla Pambu		
1987	Mupperum Deviyar		
1987	Megam Karuththirukku		
1987	Manithan	Arivu	
1987	Michael Raj		
1987	Krishnan Vandhaan	Guest Appearance	
1987	Kalyana Kacheri		
1987	Enga Ooru Pattukaran	Vadakku Vinayagam	
1987	Chinna Kuyil Paaduthu	Santhana Pottu Shanmugam	
1987	Anjatha Singam		
1987	Ananda Aradhanai		
1987	Velaikaran	Vaiyapuri	
1987	Aankalai Nambathey	Sadaiyandi "Sadai"	
1987	Arul Tharum Ayyappan		
1987	Neethikku Thandanai		
1987	Aayusu Nooru	Perumal	
1987	Idhu Oru Thodar Kathai		
1987	Iniya Uravu Poothathu		
1987	Ivargal Indiyargal	Manager	
1987	Vazhga Valarga		
1987	Ullam Kavarntha Kalvan		
1987	Thaye Neeye Thunai		
1987	Thulasi		
1987	Rekha		
1987	Poovizhi Vasalile		
1987	Ore Ratham		
1987	Oorkuruvi		
1987	Ninaikka Therindha Maname		
1987	Kizhakku Africavil Sheela		
1987	Velundu Vinaiyillai	Gnanam	
1987	Shankar Guru	S.I. Karuvayan	
1987	Veeran Veluthambi		
1987	Velicham		
1987	Uzhavan Magan	Chinna Durai's friend	
1987	Theertha Karaiyinile		
1987	Thangachi	Azhagu	
1988	Shenbagame Shenbagame	Thavil performer	
1988	Enga Ooru Kavalkaran	Senthil Kumaran	
1988	Ennai Vittu Pogaathe		
1988	Raasave Unnai Nambi	Azhagesan	
1988	Oruvar Vaazhum Aalayam		
1988	Kan Simittum Neram	Kannayiram (Kanna)	
1988	Kalyana Paravaigal		
1988	Poonthotta Kaavalkaaran	Azhagu	Guest Appearance
1988	En Vazhi Thani Vazhi		
1988	Kunguma Kodu		
1988	Kai Naattu		
1988	Ithu Engal Neethi		
1988	Irandil Ondru		
1988	Jadikketha Moodi		
1988	Kaalaiyum Neeye Maalaiyum Neeye		
1988	Koil Mani Osai		
1988	Manaivi Oru Mandiri		
1988	Naan Sonnathey Sattam	Kabali	
1988	Paatti Sollai Thattathe	Sub-Inspector	
1988	Poovum Puyalum		
1988	Sakkarai Pandhal		
1988	Senthoora Poove	Gopal	
1988	Thambi Thanga Kambi	Karuppu	
1988	Ullathil Nalla Ullam	Acolyte of Michael Raj	
1988	Thaimel Aanai	Fisherman of Rangukuppam	
1988	Uzhaithu Vaazha Vendum	Peter's employee	
1988	Valaikappu		
1988	Sudhanthira Nattin Adimaigal		
1988	Thanka Kalasam		
1988	Namma Ooru Nayagan	Vellaiappan	
1988	Neruppu Nila		
1988	Pattikattu Thambi		
1988	Paimarakappal		
1988	Paarthal Pasu		
1988	Palaivanathil Pattampoochi		
1988	Oorai Therinjikitten	Rajan's friend	
1988	Nethiyadi	Palakatchi Pachaippan	
1989	Manasukketha Maharasa		
1989	Samsarame Saranam		
1989	Ore Oru Gramathiley		
1989	Paattukku Oru Thalaivan	Azhagu	
1989	Orey Thai Orey Kulam		
1989	Kaaval Poonaigal		
1989	Thangamana Raasa	Alagusundaram	
1989	Enne Petha Raasa	Theatre employee	
1989	Raaja Raajathan	Muthupandi	
1989	Karagattakaran	Naadhas	
1989	Engal Annan Varattum		
1989	Enga Ooru Mappillai		
1989	Athaimadi Methaiadi	Mohana's husband	
1989	Ninaivu Chinnam	Aandava	
1989	Paandi Nattu Thangam	Vinayagam	
1989	Anbu Kattalai		
1989	Padicha Pulla		
1989	Thendral Sudum		
1989	Meenakshi Thiruvilayadal	Kundotharan	

=== 1990s ===
Year	Film	Role	Notes
1990	Palaivana Paravaigal	Peruchali	
1990	Madurai Veeran Enga Saami	Balusamy	
1990	Ulagam Pirandhadhu Enakkaga		
1990	Durga	Vellaiyan	
1990	Amman Koil Thiruvizha		
1990	Aatha Naan Pass Ayittaen		
1990	Thalattu Padava		
1990	Paattukku Naan Adimai		
1990	Pulan Visaranai	Police officer	Guest appearance
1990	Oru Puthiya Kathai		
1990	Aavathellam Pennale		
1990	Inaindha Kaigal	Mani	
1990	Ooru Vittu Ooru Vanthu	Tamilarasu's assistant	
1990	Enga Ooru Aattukkaran		
1990	Nalla Kaalam Porandaachu	Karapothi	
1990	Enakku Oru Neethi		
1990	Thangaikku Oru Thalattu	Arumugam	
1990	Namma Ooru Poovatha	Ekabaram's sidekick	
1990	Silambu		
1990	Jagathalaprathapan	Kittu	
1990	En Veedu En Kanavar		
1990	Vetrimalai		
1990	Thangathin Thangam		
1990	Mudhalaliyamma		
1990	Periya Veetu Pannakkaran		
1990	Periya Idathu Pillai		
1990	Maruthu Pandi		
1990	Aalay Pathu Malai Mathu		
1990	Mallu Vetti Minor		
1990	Puthu Paatu		
1990	Paalam		
1990	Paattali Magan		
1990	Neengalum Herodhan		
1990	Sathan Sollai Thattathe	Sathaiya/Sathan	
1991	Thai Poosam		
1991	Thoothu Po Chellakkiliye		
1991	Cheran Pandiyan	Thangam	
1991	Thayamma	Azhagappan	
1991	Kumbakarai Thangaiah		
1991	Sendhoora Devi	Vathalagundu Vaiyapuri	
1991	Thangamana Thangachi		
1991	Nenjamundu Nermaiundu		
1991	Naan Valartha Poove		
1991	Kaaval Nilayam	Harichandran	
1991	Adhikari		
1991	Naan Pudicha Mappillai		
1991	Naadu Adhai Naadu		
1991	Pondatti Sonna Kettukanum	Villager	
1991	Pondatti Pondattithan	Sabapathy	
1991	Thalattu Ketkuthamma	Pulipandi	
1991	Marikozhundhu	Building constructor's assistant	
1991	Mill Thozhilali		
1991	Mookuthi Poomelay		
1991	Vaidehi Kalyanam	Thangamuthu	
1991	Vetri Karangal		
1991	Vaasalile Oru Vennila		
1991	Annan Kaattiya Vazhi		
1991	Dharma Durai		
1991	Anbu Sangili	Mathrubootham	
1991	Archana IAS		
1991	Apoorva Naagam		
1991	Maanagara Kaaval	Alagappan	
1991	Oyilattam		
1991	En Rasavin Manasile		
1991	Enga Ooru Sippai		
1991	Oorellam Un Paatu		
1991	Eeswari		
1991	Nallathai Naadu Kekum	Palani	
1991	Aatha Un Koyilile	Pichumani	
1992	Senbaga Thottam		
1992	Naalaya Seidhi		
1992	Magudam	Manasthan	
1992	Pandithurai	Chola	
1992	Thangarasu		
1992	Kasthuri Manjal		
1992	Thanga Manasukkaran	Sundal	
1992	Idhuthanda Sattam		
1992	Nadodi Pattukkaran	Uyaram	
1992	Villu Pattukaran	Thangappan	
1992	Solaiyamma	Minor	
1992	David Uncle	Panniraj	
1992	Pattathu Raani	Rayappan	
1992	Abhirami	Ramkanth (Ramasamy)	
1992	Oor Mariyaathai		
1992	Deiva Vaakku		
1992	Therku Theru Machan		
1992	Unna Nenachen Pattu Padichen	Kuppusamy	
1992	Periya Gounder Ponnu		
1992	Annan Ennada Thambi Ennada		
1992	Unnai Vaazhthi Paadugiren		
1992	Ellaichami		
1992	Government Mappillai	Chokka	
1992	Onna Irukka Kathukanum	Pichumani	
1992	Endrum Anbudan	Estry	
1992	Chinna Pasanga Naanga		
1992	Chinna Thayee		
1992	Chinna Gounder	Vellai's assistant	
1992	Chinnavar		
1992	Sevagan	Kanakambaram	
1992	Rendu Pondatti Kaavalkaaran		
1992	Thaali Kattiya Raasa	Tea stall employee	
1992	Natchathira Nayagan	Thiruvasagam's assistant	
1993	Paarambariyam	Broker Kanthasamy	
1993	Thangakkili		
1993	Prathap		
1993	Uthama Raasa	Vellayathevan	
1993	Maharasan	Cook	
1993	Ezhai Jaathi	Petha Perumal	
1993	Dharma Seelan	Dindigul Sahayam	
1993	Band Master	Albert	
1993	Chinna Jameen	Vellasamy	
1993	Athma	Meiyappan	
1993	Ponnumani		
1993	Porantha Veeda Puguntha Veeda	Mohana's husband	
1993	Nallathe Nadakkum	Boologam	
1993	Manikuyil	Chinna Gounder	
1993	Amma Ponnu	Nallathambi	
1993	Rakkayi Koyil	Barber	
1993	Gentleman	Babloo	
1993	Sabash Babu		
1993	Rojavai Killathe	T.V.Thandavarayan	
1993	Koyil Kaalai		
1993	Kattabomman	Pazhani	
1993	Uzhavan		
1993	Yajaman	Azhagiri	
1993	Sakkarai Devan		
1994	Honest Raj	Velu	
1994	Nattamai	Nattamai's paternal uncle	
1994	Magudikkaran		
1994	Periya Marudhu	Azhaguraman	
1994	Dhuruva Natchathiram		
1994	Vanaja Girija	Kuppuswamy	
1994	Jai Hind	DIG of police	
1994	Jallikattu Kaalai	Punnakku	
1994	Sivantha Malar		
1994	Veera	Ravikanth	
1994	Veera Padhakkam		
1994	Varavu Ettana Selavu Pathana	Rahim	
1994	Raja Pandi		
1994	Rajakumaran	Postman	
1994	Rasigan	Kapooram	
1994	Mettupatti Mirasu		
1994	Sathyavan	Mani	
1994	Nila	Dinku	
1994	Nammavar	Perumal	
1994	Thai Maaman		
1994	Thaai Manasu	Sakkarai	
1994	Duet	Karumbaayiram	
1994	Senthamizh Selvan	Vellaichamy	
1994	Seeman		
1994	Chinna Madam	Alexander	
1994	Sethupathi IPS		
1995	Veluchami	Kannan	
1995	Naan Petha Magane		
1995	Thotta Chinungi	Pinky	
1995	Vishnu	Muthu	
1995	Karnaa	Driver	
1995	Murai Maman	Chinna Thambi	
1995	Mr. Madras	Ponnusamy	
1995	Periya Kudumbam	Post Man Dhandapani	
1995	Muthukulikka Vaariyala		
1995	Raja Enga Raja		
1995	Lucky Man	Chitragupta	
1995	Murai Mappillai	Sumesh	
1995	Ragasiya Police	Harichandran	
1995	Mannai Thottu Kumbidanum	Tyre	
1995	Thirumoorthy	Azhagesan	
1995	Sindhu Bath		
1995	Thedi Vandha Raasa		
1995	Asuran	Srinivasan	
1995	Thamizhachi		
1995	Chinna Vathiyar	Astrologer's friend	
1995	Chandralekha	Ulaganathan	
1995	Sandhaikku Vantha Kili		
1995	Kolangal	Muruga	
1995	Coolie	Ponnusamy/Munusamy/Munusamy's son	
1995	Neela Kuyil		
1995	Marumagan		
1995	Maa Manithan		
1995	Varraar Sandiyar		
1995	En Pondatti Nallava		
1995	Paattu Vaathiyar	Pulipandi	
1995	Muthu	Thennappan	
1995	Muthu Kaalai		
1995	Nadodi Mannan		
1995	Kattumarakaran		
1996	Amman Kovil Vaasalile		
1996	Namma Ooru Raasa		
1996	Pudhu Nilavu		
1996	Poovarasan	Samuthiram	
1996	Ullathai Allitha	Viswanathan's manager	
1996	Enakkoru Magan Pirappan	Muthu	
1996	Gnanapazham	Aazhagu Aarthi's car driver	
1996	Nethaji		
1996	Senathipathi	Veera Bahu	
1996	Nattupura Pattu	Chinna Karuppan	
1996	Avathara Purushan		
1996	Vishwanath	Shankarlal	
1996	Mahaprabhu	Vicky	
1996	Coimbatore Mappillai	White	
1996	Parambarai	Kanayiram	
1996	Indian	Panneerselvam	
1996	Katta Panchayathu	Chinna Thambi	
1996	Selva	Magic Guruji	
1997	Roja Malare	Babu	
1997	Themmangu Paattukaaran		
1997	Rettai Jadai Vayasu	Pangali	
1997	Gopura Deepam		
1997	Pudhayal		
1997	Janakiraman		
1997	Aahaa Enna Porutham	Jack-an-Jill	
1997	Vallal	Worker	
1997	Nesam	Thanikachalam	
1997	Dharma Chakkaram	Palani	
1997	Pasamulla Pandiyare	Appusamy	
1997	Arunachalam	Arivazhagan	
1997	Thaali Pudhusu	'Leg' Dada	
1997	Nalla Manasukkaran		
1998	Aval Varuvala	Michael Jackson	
1998	Ninaithen Vandhai	Swapna's and Savithri's uncle	
1998	Naam Iruvar Namakku Iruvar	Kumbudraswamy and Kuppuswamy	
1998	En Aasai Rasave		
1998	Veeram Vilanja Mannu	Andiappan	
1998	En Uyir Nee Thaane	Nicolas	
1998	Jeans	Juno	
1998	Bhagavath Singh		
1998	Natpukkaga	Kunnan	
1998	Velli Nilave		
1999	Thodarum		
1999	Azhagarsamy		
1999	Ponvizha		
1999	Nesam Pudhusu	Chithappu	
1999	Padayappa	Alagapuri Azhagesan	
1999	Ethirum Pudhirum		
1999	Pudhu Kudithanam	Azhagu	
1999	Sundari Neeyum Sundaran Naanum	Anuja's husband	
1999	Kanmani Unakkaga	Kandha	
1999	Ullathai Killathe		
1999	Kudumba Sangili		
1999	Hello		
1999	Suyamvaram	Panchabootham	
1999	Poomaname Vaa		
1999	Maravathe Kanmaniye		
1999	Suriya Paarvai	Pichai Perumal / Sundaram	

=== 2000s ===
Year	Film	Role	Notes
2000	Simmasanam	Kandhasamy	
2000	Karisakattu Poove	Chinnayya	
2000	Unnai Kann Theduthey		
2000	Veeranadai		
2000	Kannaal Pesavaa	Nelson Mandela	
2000	Krodham 2		
2000	Vaanathaippola	Hotel Owner Manikkavel	
2000	Kandukondain Kandukondain	Himself	Cameo
2000	Puratchikkaaran		
2000	Kannan Varuvaan	Sooravali	
2000	Palayathu Amman		
2001	Ullam Kollai Poguthae	Himself	Cameo
2001	Kottai Mariamman		
2001	Vadagupatti Maapillai		
2001	Vedham		
2001	Seerivarum Kaalai	Police Constable	
2001	Samudhiram	M. Tharmaraj	
2001	Azhagana Naatkal	Mahali	
2002	Raajjiyam		
2002	Andipatti Arasampatti		
2002	Vivaramana Aalu	Politician	
2002	Samasthanam	Mani	
2002	Padai Veetu Amman	Sadaiyaandi	
2002	Devan	Police officer	
2002	I Love You Da	Raju's Grandfather	
2002	Virumbugiren		
2003	Soori	Surya's friend	
2003	Iyarkai	Bar owner	
2003	Whistle	College canteen incharge	
2003	Chokka Thangam	Servant	
2003	Anbe Anbe	Punniyakodi	
2003	Punnagai Poove		
2003	Jayam	Maadasamy	
2003	Boys	Anna Veri Kannaiyan	Guest appearance
2003	Aalukkoru Aasai	Arivazhagan's grandfather	
2003	Yes Madam	Arvind Swamy	
2003	Military	Aravind Swamy	
2003	Super Da		
2004	Neranja Manasu	Ayyanar's uncle	
2006	Kai Vandha Kalai		
2006	Vanjagan		
2008	Satyam	Paneerselvam	
2008	Ayyavazhi		
2009	Engal Aasan	'Aanikkaal' Ramasamy	

=== 2010s ===
Year	Film	Role	Notes
2010	Siddhu +2		Cameo appearance
2010	Irumbukkottai Murattu Singam	Rangula Peri	
2015	Nathikal Nanaivathillai		
2015	Maharani Kottai		
2015	Kallappadam	Sundharamoorthi	
2015	Thiruttu VCD	Don	
2015	Athiradi	Fisherman	
2016	Ennama Katha Vudranunga	Priest	
2017	Unnai Thottu Kolla Vaa		
2017	Kalavu Thozhirchalai	Pithambaram	
2018	Thaanaa Serndha Koottam	KP	
2019	Charlie Chaplin 2	Priest	Guest appearance
2019	Oviyavai Vitta Yaru	Seetha's caretaker	

=== 2020s ===
Year	Film	Role	Notes
2022	Kichi Kichi	Managing Director (MD)	
2022	Pistha	Money donator	
2023	Dinosaurs	Bus Conductor	
2023	Kick	Casio	
2024	Lal Salaam	Samikkannu	
2025	Kuzhanthaigal Munnetra Kazhagam		
2025	Aghathiyaa	Rayon	
2025	Vanganna Vanakkanganna		
2026	Siva Sambo	Minor Kunju	
2026	Pyaar Prema Kalyanam	Nadhars Thatha	

== Telugu films ==
Year	Title	Role
1986	Driver Babu	Stage drama artiste
1993	Tholi Muddhu	Swamiji
1993	Mogudu Garu	Pig pen owner
2008	Salute	Paneerselvam
2011	Money Money, More Money	Dr. Sabhapathi

== Other language films ==
Year	Title	Role	Language	Notes
1980	Ithikkara Pakki	Tribal	Malayalam	
1991	Phool Bane Angaray	Muthuswamy	Hindi	
1993	Insaniyat Ke Devta	Muthuswamy	Hindi	
2000	Millennium Stars		Malayalam	
2006	Out of Syllabus		Malayalam	
2009	Aayirathil Oruvan	Annachi	Malayalam	

== Television ==
Year	Title	Role	Channel	References
2019	Thiravam		ZEE5	
2019-2020	Rasaathi	Alagar Swamy	Sun TV	
2022	Kaiyum Kalavum		Sony LIV	
