= List of Tamil films of 1987 =

Post-amendment to the Tamil Nadu Entertainments Tax Act 1939 on 1 April 1958, Gross jumped to 140 per cent of Nett Commercial Taxes Department disclosed ₹61 crore in entertainment tax revenue for the year.

The following is a list of films produced in the Tamil film industry in India in 1987, in chronological order.

== Released films ==
Opening		Title	Director	Cast	Production	Ref
J A N	1	Manaivi Ready	Pandiarajan	Pandiarajan, Debashree Roy, K. A. Thangavelu, R. S. Manohar, Manorama	Rathnam Art Movies	
J A N	1	Thalidhaanam	R. C. Sakthi	Rajesh, Lakshmi, Jayashree, Y. G. Mahendra	Annakkili V. Movies	
J A N	1	Poove Ilam Poove	Sirumugai Ravi	Suresh, Nadhiya, Jaishankar, S. S. Chandran, Senthil, Sumithra	Vijaya Kala Pictures	
J A N	1	Enga Veettu Ramayanan	K. Chozha Rajan	Karthik, S. Ve. Shekher, Ilavarasi, Mahalakshmi, S. S. Chandran, Vanitha	Anil Creations	
J A N	14	Velicham	Sundar K. Vijayan	Karthik, Ranjini, Nizhalgal Ravi, Sumithra, Senthil, Kovai Sarala	L. V. Creations	
J A N	14	Nilavai Kayil Pudichen	Rama Narayanan	Chandrasekhar, Seetha	United International	
J A N	14	Kizhakku Africavil Sheela	Dwarakish	Suresh, Shakeela, Senthil, Kovai Sarala	Dwarakish Chithra	
J A N	14	Kadhal Parisu	A. Jagannathan	Kamal Haasan, Ambika, Radha, Jaishankar, Janagaraj, Kovai Sarala	Sathya Movies	
J A N	14	Raja Mariyadhai	Karthick Raghunath	Sivaji Ganesan, Karthik, Jeevitha, Janagaraj, Senthil, Sadhana	Kaiser Creations	
J A N	14	Sirai Paravai	Manobala	Vijayakanth, Radhika, Baby Shalini, Senthil, Y. Vijaya	Manthralaya Cine Creations	
J A N	14	Poovizhi Vasalile	Fazil	Sathyaraj, Karthika, Baby Sujitha	Lakshmi Priya Combines	
J A N	15	Thirumathi Oru Vegumathi	Visu	Pandiyan, Visu, Jayashree, Kalpana, S. Ve. Shekher, Nizhalgal Ravi, Kismu	Kavithalayaa Productions	
J A N	15	Paruva Ragam	V. Ravichandran	V. Ravichandran, Juhi Chawla, Jaishankar, Manorama	Sri Eswari Productions	
J A N	23	Solvathellam Unmai	Nethaji	Vijayakanth, Rekha, Jaishankar	National Movie Makers	
J A N	26	Kudumbam Oru Kovil	A. C. Tirulokchandar	Sivaji Ganesan, Lakshmi	Sujatha Cine Arts	
F E B	6	Nalla Pambu	Rama Narayanan	Karthik, Ambika, Madhuri, S. S. Chandran, Senthil, Kovai Sarala	Eagle Productions	
F E B	13	Valayal Satham	Jeevabalan	Murali, Bhagya, Raja, Madhuri, Chandrasekhar, M. N. Nambiar, Manorama, Janagaraj, Senthil	Balan Pictures	
F E B	19	Poo Mazhai Pozhiyuthu	V. Azhagappan	Vijayakanth, Nadhiya, Suresh	Sri Rajakali Amman Movies	
F E B	27	Vilangu	P. Jayadevi	Jaishankar, Nizhalgal Ravi, Nalini, Arun Pandian, Ramya Krishnan, Sulakshana, Janagaraj	Bhanu Arts	
F E B	27	Rettai Vaal Kuruvi	Balu Mahendra	Mohan, Radhika, Archana, V. K. Ramasamy, Thengai Srinivasan	Saagar Combines	
F E B	27	Chinna Thambi Periya Thambi	Manivannan	Sathyaraj, Prabhu, Nadhiya, Nizhalgal Ravi, Sudha Chandran	Semba Creations	
M A R
M A R	6	Megam Karuththirukku	Rama Narayanan	Prabhu, Rekha, S. S. Chandran	Sri Thenandal Films	
M A R	6	Muthukkal Moondru	A. Jagannathan	Sivaji Ganesan, Sathyaraj, Pandiarajan, Ranjini, Thengai Srinivasan, Manorama, Baby Sujitha	Padmam Production	
M A R	7	Velundu Vinaiyillai	K. Shankar	Vijayakanth, Ambika, M. N. Nambiar, Senthil, Vadivukkarasi	Om Muruga Arts	
M A R	7	Velaikaran	S. P. Muthuraman	Rajinikanth, Amala, K. R. Vijaya, Sarath Babu, Pallavi, V. K. Ramasamy, Senthil	Kavithalayaa Productions	
M A R	19	Sankar Guru	L. Raja	Arjun, Seetha, Sasikala, Baby Shalini, Senthil, Manorama, Y. G. Mahendra	AVM Productions	
M A R	21	Ilangeswaran	T. R. Ramanna	K. R. Vijaya, Rajesh, Revathi, Srividya, Sripriya	Sri Sivakami Productions	
M A R	27	Ananda Aradhanai	Dinesh Baboo	Mohan, Suhasini, Lizy, Srividya, Senthil, Kovai Sarala	Jai Krishna Combines	
A P R	10	Aalappirandhavan	A. S. Pragasam	Sathyaraj, Ambika, Silk Smitha, Master Tinku	Pragaas Productions	
A P R	14	Veerapandiyan	Karthick Raghunath	Sivaji Ganesan, Vijayakanth, Radhika, Jaishankar, Sumithra, V. K. Ramasamy, Anuradha	Prakash Pictures	
A P R	14	Makkal En Pakkam	Karthick Raghunath	Sathyaraj, Ambika, Rajesh, Nagesh, Janagaraj, Manorama, Anuradha	Suresh Arts	
A P R	14	Thaye Neeye Thunai	P. R. Somu	K. R. Vijaya, Karthik, Pandiyan, Sudha Chandran, Senthil, S. S. Chandran	Sri Bhuvaneswari Kala Mandir	
A P R	14	Enga Chinna Rasa	K. Bhagyaraj	K. Bhagyaraj, Radha, C. R. Saraswathy	Sri Amman Creations	
A P R	14	Oru Thayin Sabhatham	T. Rajendar	T. Rajendar, Srividya, Nizhalgal Ravi, S. S. Chandran	Chimbu Cine Arts	
A P R	17	Chinna Poove Mella Pesu	Robert–Rajasekar	Prabhu, Ramki, Narmadha, Shubha, Sudha Chandran, Sabitha Anand, Chinni Jayanth	Ess Kay Film Combines	
M A Y	1	Neethikku Thandanai	S. A. Chandrasekhar	Radhika, Ravichandran, Srividya, Nizhalgal Ravi, Charan Raj, Senthil, S. S. Chandran, Kovai Sarala	Lalithanjali Fine Arts	
M A Y	8	Ore Raththam	K. Sornam	Karthik, Pandiyan, Seetha, Madhuri, M. K. Stalin, Kismu, Manorama	Murasu Movies	
M A Y	15	Paadu Nilave	K. Rangaraj	Mohan, Nadhiya, Ravichandran, Senthil	Krishnalaya Productions	
M A Y	15	Rekha	N. Raghav	Ilavarasan, Sandhya	Ashapriya Productions	
M A Y	16	Anbulla Appa	A. C. Tirulokchandar	Sivaji Ganesan, Nadhiya, Rahman, V. K. Ramasamy, Y. G. Mahendra, Manorama, Sangeetha, Baby Sujitha	AVM Productions	
M A Y	29	Kavalan Avan Kovalan	Visu	Prabhu, Rekha, Madhuri, Visu, Prameela, Kalaranjini	K. R. G. Film Circuit	
M A Y	29	Ival Oru Pournami	T. P. K.	Raveendran, Seetha, Rooplatha, Sri Raman	T. P. K. Productions	
J U N	4	Cooliekkaran	Rajasekhar	Vijayakanth, Jaishankar, Srividya, Rupini, Radha Ravi, Silk Smitha, Nagesh, S. S. Chandran	Kalaippuli International	
J U N	12	Veeran Veluthambi	Rama Narayanan	Radha Ravi, Ambika, Chandrasekhar, Rekha, Senthil, S. S. Chandran	Sri Thenandal Films	
J U N	12	Kadamai Kanniyam Kattupaadu	Santhana Bharathi	Sathyaraj, Nalini, Jeevitha, Geetha	Raaj Kamal Films International	
J U N	12	Ini Oru Sudhanthiram	Manivannan	Sivakumar, Nalini, Chandrasekhar, Pandiyan, Rekha, Raja, Jeevitha, Sulakshana, Janagaraj, Senthil, Kovai Sarala	Kalaikovil	
J U N	17	Enga Ooru Pattukaran	Gangai Amaran	Ramarajan, Rekha, Nishanthi, S. S. Chandran, Senthil, Kovai Sarala	Meenakshi Arts	
J U N	17	Kavithai Paada Neramillai	Yugi Sethu	Amala, Raghuvaran, Yugi Sethu, Nassar	Maayas Cope Film Company	
J U N	27	Aankalai Nambathey	K. Alex Pandian	Pandiyan, Rekha, Ramya Krishnan, Senthil, V. K. Ramasamy, S. S. Chandran	Alamu Movies	
J U L	10	Vanna Kanavugal	Ameerjan	Karthik, Murali, Jayashree, Charle	Kavithalayaa Productions	
J U L	10	Ivargal Indiyargal	S. Jagadeesan	Ramarajan, Madhuri, Lakshmi, Senthil	Oaam Selvi Arts	
J U L	11	Idhu Oru Thodar Kathai	Anu Mohan	Mohan, Amala, Rekha, Goundamani, Senthil	Royal India Creations	
J U L	16	Per Sollum Pillai	S. P. Muthuraman	Kamal Haasan, Radhika, K. R. Vijaya, Goundamani, Manorama, Raveendran, Ramya Krishnan	AVM Productions	
J U L	17	Etikku Potti	R. Govindarajan	Pandiarajan, Saritha, Chithrangi, Rajeev	Murali Cine Arts	
J U L	22	Jaathi Pookkal	A. P. Rathinam	Shanavas, Nalini	Lavanya Films	
J U L	24	Chinna Kuyil Paaduthu	P. Madhavan	Sivakumar, Ambika, Ilavarasi, Cho, Senthil, Manorama, Kovai Sarala, Master Tinku	Karpagam Films	
J U L	24	Mangai Oru Gangai	Hariharan	Saritha, Suresh, Nadhiya	Motherland Pictures	
J U L	24	Ninaive Oru Sangeetham	K. Rangaraj	Vijayakanth, Radha, Srividya, Rekha, Goundamani, Senthil, Kovai Sarala	V. N. S. Films	
J U L	31	Dhoorathu Pachai	Manobala	Karthik, Suhasini, Thulasi	Sri Lakshmi Art Movies	
J U L	31	Ondru Engal Jathiye..!	Ramarajan	Ramarajan, Nishanthi, Ravichandran, Sulakshana, Senthil, S. S. Chandran	Sri Devi Bagavathi Films	
A U G	14	Ninaikka Therintha Maname	I. Suresh	Mohan, Rupini, Chandrasekhar	Sivadharani Movies	
A U G	14	Kani Nilam	S. Arunmozhi	Kalairani, Nassar, Delhi Ganesh	Latha Creations	
A U G	15	Vairagyam	K. Vijayan	Prabhu, Radha, Sowcar Janaki, Jaishankar, Manorama, Janagaraj	Sujatha Cine Arts	
A U G	21	Anjatha Singam	M. R. Vijaychander	Prabhu, Sathyaraj, Nalini, Jaishankar, Silk Smitha, Anuradha, Senthil, Vanitha	Karthik Arts	
A U G	28	Jallikattu	Manivannan	Sivaji Ganesan, Sathyaraj, Radha, Janagaraj	Seetha Lakshmi Art Films	
A U G	28	Krishnan Vandhaan	K. Vijayan	Sivaji Ganesan, Mohan, Rekha, Thengai Srinivasan	S. L. S. Productions	
S E P	4	Oorkavalan	Manobala	Rajinikanth, Radhika, Pandiyan, Y. G. Mahendra, Chithra	Sathya Movies	
S E P	4	Ullam Kavarntha Kalvan	Ashok Kumar	Pandiarajan, Rekha, Nizhalgal Ravi, V. K. Ramasamy, Manorama, Kovai Sarala, Master Tinku	Appu Movies	
S E P	11	Theertha Karaiyinile	Manivannan	Mohan, Rupini, Senthil, Janagaraj, Kovai Sarala	Kamala Chithram	
S E P	11	Vaazhga Valarga	Vijaya Krishnaraj	Pandiarajan, Radha Ravi, Saritha, Deepa, Senthil, Kovai Sarala	Niruma Creation	
S E P	12	Koottu Puzhukkal	R. C. Sakthi	Raghuvaran, Amala, Chandrasekhar, Y. Vijaya	Palayee Amman Art Creations	
S E P	18	Poo Poova Poothirukku	V. Azhagappan	Prabhu, Saritha, Amala, Rajeev, Senthil, Manorama	My Productions	
S E P	18	Parisam Pottachu	K. Chozha Rajan	Karthik, Pandiyan, Ranjini, Madhuri, Senthil, S. S. Chandran	Kalaimani Movies	
S E P	18	Kathai Kathaiyam Karanamam	Y. G. Mahendra	Y. G. Mahendra, Pallavi, Jaishankar, Visu, Manorama	Sri Lakshmi Jyothi Movies	
S E P	18	Ellaikodu	K. Jothipandiyan	Saritha, Rajesh, Radha Ravi	S. S. G. Films	
S E P	25	Meendum Mahaan	Uthaman	Pandiarajan, Murali, Rahman, Rekha, Madhuri, S. Ve. Shekher, Aruna	Rathnam Cine Arts	
O C T	21	Manithan	S. P. Muthuraman	Rajinikanth, Rupini, Srividya, Raghuvaran, Madhuri, Cho, Senthil	AVM Productions	
O C T	21	Uzhavan Magan	R. Aravindraj	Vijayakanth, Radhika, Radha, Senthil, S. S. Chandran, Kovai Sarala	Rowther films	
O C T	21	Chellakutti	K. Natraj	Sarath Babu, Sujatha, Ravichandran	Dhandayudhapani Films	
O C T	21	Sattam Oru Vilayattu	S. A. Chandrasekhar	Vijayakanth, Radha, Ravichandran, Srividya, S. S. Chandran	V. V. Creations	
O C T	21	Nayakan	Mani Ratnam	Kamal Haasan, Saranya, Karthika, Janagaraj, Nassar, Nizhalgal Ravi, Thara	Muktha Films	
O C T	21	Pookkal Vidum Thudhu	Sreedhar Rajan	T. Rajendar, Monisha Unni, Harish	Sri Sivahari Films	
O C T	21	Iniya Uravu Poothathu	C. V. Sridhar	Suresh, Nadhiya, S. Ve. Shekher, Babita, Cho	Sri Rajakaliamman Productions	
O C T	21	Ivargal Varungala Thoongal	Venkat	Prabhu, Ambika, Raghuvaran, Jaishankar, Jayachitra, Nagesh, Disco Shanti	Perfect Productions	
O C T	21	Manathil Urudhi Vendum	K. Balachandar	Suhasini, Sridhar, S. P. Balasubrahmanyam, Ramesh Aravind	Kavithalayaa Productions	
O C T	21	Neram Nalla Irukku	Manoj Kumar	Ramarajan, Nishanthi, Janagaraj, Senthil, Vidya Venugopal, Deepa	Srini Creations	
O C T	21	Puyal Paadum Paattu	Manivannan	Raghuvaran, Radhika	Poompuhar Productions	
N O V	12	Mupperum Deviyar	K. Shankar	K. R. Vijaya, Sujatha, Lakshmi, Prabhu, Ambika, Senthil	Ammu Creations	
N O V	20	Thambathyam	K. Vijayan	Sivaji Ganesan, Ambika, Radha, V. K. Ramasamy, Thulasi, Prasad	Kalyani Cine Arts	
N O V	20	Aayusu Nooru	Ponmani Rajan	Pandiyan, Pandiarajan, Ranjini, Senthil, Kovai Sarala	Sampath Creations	
N O V	20	Anand	C. V. Rajendran	Prabhu, Radha, Jayashree, Chinni Jayanth	Sivaji Productions	
N O V	27	Thulasi	Ameerjan	Murali, Seetha, Chandrasekhar, Senthil, Charle, Thara	Veeralakshmi Combines	
N O V	27	Thangachi	R. Krishnamurthy	Ramki, Seetha, Pallavi, Radha Ravi, Nizhalgal Ravi, Senthil, S. S. Chandran, Anuradha	Rathna Movies	
N O V	27	Pesum Padam	Singeetam Srinivasa Rao	Kamal Haasan, Amala, Tinnu Anand, P. L. Narayana, Pratap K. Pothen, Farida Jalal	Mandakini Chitra	
N O V	27	Arul Tharum Ayyappan	Dasarathan	Pandiyan, M. Viswanathan, Rekha, Raghuvaran, Senthil	Sri Balamurugan Film Circuit	
D E C	4	Kalyana Kacheri	Manivannan	Arjun, Ilavarasi, Senthil, Anuradha, Chinni Jayanth	Suriyaraj Combines	
D E C	5	Michael Raj	V. C. Guhanathan	Raghuvaran, Madhuri, Sarath Babu, Sumithra, Senthil, Viji, Baby Shalini	Suresh Productions	
D E C	18	Gramatthu Minnal	K. Rangaraj	Ramarajan, Revathi, Raja, Goundamani	Keerthana Creations	
D E C	18	Paasam Oru Vesham	Jayadevi	Ranjini, Madhuri, Disco Shanti, Vinu Chakravarthy, Nassar, Thyagu	Liberty Films	
D E C	26	Oor Kuruvi	O. S. Sivakumar	Arun Pandian, Srividya, Madhavi	Mass Productions	
D E C	27	Vedham Pudhithu	Bharathiraja	Sathyaraj, Amala, Saritha, Raja, Janagaraj	Janani Art Creations	
D E C	29	Aval Mella Sirithal	M. N. Jai Sundar	Murali, Seetha, Madhuri, S. S. Chandran, Chinni Jayanth, Charle	Sri Kavitha Cine Arts	
