= List of Tamil films of 1986 =

Post-amendment to the Tamil Nadu Entertainments Tax Act 1939 on 1 April 1958, Gross jumped to 140 per cent of Nett Commercial Taxes Department disclosed ₹61 crore in entertainment tax revenue for the year.

The following is a list of films produced in the Tamil film industry in India in 1986, in alphabetical order.

== 1986 ==
Title	Director	Producer	Music	Cast
Aayiram Kannudayaal	K. Shankar	Sasivarnam Films	Shankar–Ganesh	Padmini, Jeevitha, Prabha, Baby Shalini, Rajeev, Senthil
Aayiram Pookkal Malarattum	E. Ramadoss	Motherland Pictures	V. S. Narasimhan	Mohan, Seetha, Ranjini, Goundamani, Senthil, Janagaraj
Adutha Veedu	Rama Narayanan	Visakam Art Productions	Shankar–Ganesh	S. Ve. Shekher, Chandrasekhar, Ilavarasi, Madhuri
Africavil Appu	Vijay Anand	Sri Rajeswari Creations	Ilaiyaraaja	Nalini, Suresh
Amman Kovil Kizhakale	R. Sundarrajan	V. N. S. Productions	Ilaiyaraaja	Vijayakanth, Radha, Ravichandran, Srividya, Senthil
Anandha Kanneer	K. Vijayan	Sivaji Productions	Shankar–Ganesh	Sivaji Ganesan, Lakshmi, Visu, Rajeev, Nizhalgal Ravi, Jayashree, Rajyalakshmi, Janagaraj
Annai En Dheivam	R. Krishnamoorthy	Mandhralaya Arts	Shankar–Ganesh	Vijayakanth, Jaishankar, K. R. Vijaya, Madhuri, Manorama, Y. G. Mahendra, Vadivukkarasi
Aruvadai Naal	G. M. Kumar	Sivaji Productions	Ilaiyaraaja	Prabhu, Pallavi, Ramkumar, Vadivukkarasi, Raasi
Avalai Solli Kuttramillai	A. A. Soman	Velan Creations	Gangai Amaran	Sarath Babu, Ranjini, Pavithra
Bathil Solval Bhadrakali	S. Jagadeesan	Oaam Selvi Arts	K. V. Mahadevan	Jaishankar, K. R. Vijaya, Ilavarasi, Jeevitha, Viji, Rajeev, Senthil
Choru	Rama Narayanan	Sri Thenandal Films	Shankar–Ganesh	S. Ve. Shekher, Chandrasekhar, Jeevitha, Vanithasri
Cinema Cinema	T. P. Gajendran	Leo International	M. S. Viswanathan	S. Ve. Shekher, Kalaiselvi
December Pookkal	R. Boopathy	N. R. K. Cine Arts	Ilaiyaraaja	Mohan, Revathi, Nalini, Nizhalgal Ravi, Goundamani, Senthil
Dharma Devathai	S. P. Muthuraman	AVM Productions	Raveendran	Vijayakanth, Radhika, Pallavi
Dharma Pathini	Ameerjan	Sri Shanmugalaya Arts	Ilaiyaraaja	Karthik, Jeevitha, Chandrasekhar, Goundamani, Senthil
Dharmam	R. Thyagarajan	Devar Films	Usha Khanna	Sathyaraj, Jaishankar, Saritha, Sudha Chandran
En Sabatham	S. A. Chandrasekhar	G. R. P. Arts	Gangai Amaran	Arjun, Anitha
Enakku Nane Needipathi	S. A. Chandrasekhar	Kay Cee Film Combines	Ilaiyaraaja	Vijayakanth, Jeevitha, Jaishankar, Lakshmi
Endravathu Oru Naal	Balu Anand	Gopi Visalakshi Films	Shankar–Ganesh	Naresh Kumar, Madhuri
Engal Thaikulame Varuge	V. N. Sambantham	P. A. S. Production	Chandrabose	Suresh, Jeevitha, Goundamani, Silk Smitha, Thengai Srinivasan, Manorama, Y. G. Mahendra
Iravu Pookkal	Sridhar Rajan	Sri Sivahari Films	Ilaiyaraaja	Sathyaraj, Nalini, Raveendran, Jeevitha, Y. G. Mahendra
Isai Paadum Thendral	S. Devarajan	N. C. Creations	Ilaiyaraaja	Sivakumar, Ambika, Rekha, Goundamani, Janagaraj
Jeevanathi	Sanjay-Bhaskar	Our National Creations	M. S. Viswanathan	Sivakumar, Ilavarasi, Goundamani, Anuradha
Jigu Jigu Rayil	Manivannan	Gangai Pictures	Shankar–Ganesh	S. Ve. Shekher, Sulakshana
Jothi Malar	Rama Narayanan	Bhairavi Creation	Shankar–Ganesh	Suresh, Nalini, K. R. Vijaya
Kadaikan Paarvai	Raaj Sridhar	Sri Hemamalini Productions	V. S. Narasimhan	Pandiyan, Sathyaraj, Ilavarasi
Kadalora Kavithaigal	Bharathiraja	Mookambika Art Creations	Ilaiyaraaja	Sathyaraj, Rekha, Raja, Ranjini, Janagaraj
Kagidha Odam	Rama Narayanan	Poompuhar Production	Shankar–Ganesh	Ilavarasan, Nalini
Kaithiyin Theerpu	Vijaya Bharathy	Sunshine Creations	R. Ramanujam	Vijaya Bharathy, Jaishankar, Urvashi, Anuradha
Kalamellam Un Madiyil	Rajasekhar	Prem Priya Productions	Chandrabose	Murali, Jayashree, Ganga, Vijay Babu, Janagaraj
Kanmaniye Pesu	Rajasekhar	Aries Cine Arts	Raveendran	Sivakumar, Lakshmi, Ambika
Kanna Thorakkanum Saami	R. Govindaraj	Punitha Cine Arts	Ilaiyaraaja; Gangai Amaran	Sivakumar, Jeevitha, Cho, Manorama
Kanne Kaniyamuthe	Sakthi Kannan	Saj Productions	M. S. Viswanathan	Rehman, Amala, Jaishankar, Sujatha, Senthil
Kannukku Mai Ezhuthu	Mahendran	Blue Moon Movies	Ilaiyaraaja	P. Bhanumathi, Sujatha, Sarath Babu, Vadivukkarasi
Karimedu Karuvayan	Rama Narayanan	Meenakshi Arts	Ilaiyaraaja	Vijayakanth, Nalini, Sathyaraj, Pandiyan, Aruna, Goundamani, Senthil, Vinu Chakravarthy
Kodai Mazhai	Muktha S. Sundar	Muktha Films	Ilaiyaraaja	Vidya Venugopal, Jaishankar, Lakshmi, Sripriya, Prasad, S. Ve. Shekher
Kovil Yaanai	Kandasami-Singaram	Sri Viji Movies	Chandrabose	Pandiyan, Jayashree, Radha Ravi, S. S. Chandran, Senthil, Kovai Sarala, Kuyili, Anuradha
Kulirkaala Megangal	C. V. Sridhar	Vasan Brothers	Shankar–Ganesh	Arjun, Jaishankar, Sadhana, Thengai Srinivasan, Manorama, Vanitha
Kungamapottu	R. Ranjith Kumar	Sri Padma Balaji Films	Shankar–Ganesh	R. Ranjith Kumar, Saritha
Lakshmi Vandhachu	Rajasekhar	Aries Cine Arts	Raveendran	Sivaji Ganesan, Padmini, Revathi, Nizhalgal Ravi, S. Ve. Shekher, Jayachitra, Baby Meena
Maaveeran	Rajasekhar	Padmalaya Pictures	Ilaiyaraaja	Rajinikanth, Ambika, Jaishankar, Sujatha, Dara Singh, Nagesh, Vijayakumar, Sunitha
Machakaaran	Raj Bharath	Navasakthi Pictures	Shankar–Ganesh	Thiagarajan, Radhika, Urvashi, K. R. Vijaya
Mahasakthi Mariamman	K. S. Gopalakrishnan	Karpaga Lakshmi Pictures	K. V. Mahadevan	K. R. Vijaya, Sujatha, Rajesh, Ilavarasi, Chandrasekhar, Anuradha, Jayachitra, Sumithra
Malarum Ninaivugal	Krishnan–Panju	Meenakshi Films	V. Kumar	
Mamiyargal Jakkirathai	Rama Narayanan	Kamal Chithiram	Chandrabose	Raveendran, Nalini
Manakanakku	R. C. Sakthi	Vinod Art Pictures	M. S. Viswanathan	Vijayakanth, Radha, Ambika, Sarath Babu, Rajesh
Manthira Punnagai	V. Thamizhalagan	Sathya Movies	Ilaiyaraaja	Sathyaraj, Nadhiya, Raghuvaran, Baby Sujitha, Jai Jagadish, Senthil
Manithanin Marupakkam	K. Rangaraj	Sathya Jyothi Films	Ilaiyaraaja	Sivakumar, Radha, Jayashree, Jai Jagadish, Rajyalakshmi
Mannukkul Vairam	Manoj Kumar	Motherland Pictures	Devendran	Sivaji Ganesan, Sujatha, Rajesh, Murali, Pandiyan, Ranjini, Vani Viswanath, Goundamani, Senthil, Kovai Sarala
Maragatha Veenai	Gokula Krishnan	Naveena Productions	Ilaiyaraaja	Suresh, Revathi, Goundamani, Chandrasekhar, Senthil, Manorama, Baby Sonia
Marakka Maatten	Ramarajan	Veeralakshmi Combines	Gangai Amaran	Nizhalgal Ravi, Viji, Janagaraj, S. S. Chandran, Senthil, Kovai Sarala
Marumagal	Karthick Raghunath	Sujatha Cine Arts	Chandrabose	Sivaji Ganesan, Jaishankar, Suresh, Revathi, Pavithra, Y. G. Mahendra, Manorama
Maruthi	K. V. Thyagarajan	Vijayakala Pictures	Shankar–Ganesh	Chandrasekhar, S. Ve. Shekher, Jeevitha, Madhuri, S. S. Chandran, Senthil
Meendum Pallavi	A. P. Jegadeesh	Ibrahim Cine Enterprises	M. S. Viswanathan	Jaishankar, Sujatha, Raghuvaran, Rajyalakshmi, Anuradha, Goundamani
Melmaruvathur Arpudhangal	S. Jagadeesan	Oaam Selvi Arts	K. V. Mahadevan	K. R. Vijaya, Rajesh, Radha Ravi, Nalini, Sulakshana, Thengai Srinivasan
Mella Thirandhathu Kadhavu	R. Sundarrajan	AVM Productions	M. S. Viswanathan; Ilaiyaraaja	Mohan, Radha, Amala, Visu, Senthil
Mouna Ragam	Mani Ratnam	Sujatha Productions	Ilaiyaraaja	Mohan, Revathi, Karthik
Mounam Kalaikirathu	Karikalan	H. M. C. Productions	Shankar–Ganesh	Suresh, Anand Babu, Jeevitha, Jayashree, Vijayakumar, S. S. Chandran, Senthil
Mr. Bharath	S. P. Muthuraman	AVM Productions	Ilaiyaraaja	Rajinikanth, Ambika, Sathyaraj, Sharada, Goundamani, S. Ve. Shekher, Viji, Visu
Murattu Karangal	Rajasekhar	Hemnag Films	Ilaiyaraaja	Thiagarajan, Sulakshana, Sathyaraj, Jaishankar, Deepa
Muthal Vasantham	Manivannan	Everest Films	Ilaiyaraaja	Pandiyan, Chandrasekhar, Sathyaraj, Ramya Krishnan, Mahalakshmi
Mythili Ennai Kaathali	T. Rajendar	Thanjai Cine Arts	T. Rajendar	T. Rajendar, Srividya, Amala, S. S. Chandran
Naan Adimai Illai	Dwarakish	Dwarakish Chithra	Vijay Anand	Rajinikanth, Sridevi, Girish Karnad, V. K. Ramasamy, Thengai Srinivasan, Manorama, Y. G. Mahendra, Vanitha
Naalellam Pournami	Utthaman	Vikranth Creations	Gangai Amaran	Prabhu, Ranjini, Manimaran
Naanum Oru Thozhilali	C. V. Sridhar	Chitralaya	Ilaiyaraaja	Kamal Haasan, Ambika, Jaishankar
Nambinar Keduvathillai	K. Shankar	Siva Shankar Motion Pictures	M. S. Viswanathan	Vijayakanth, Prabhu, Jayashree, Sudha Chandran, Senthil, Manorama
Namma Ooru Nalla Ooru	V. Azhagappan	Sri Devi Bagavathi Films	Gangai Amaran	Ramarajan, Rekha, Rajeev, Sulakshana, S. S. Chandran, Senthil
Natpu	Ameerjan	Veeralakshmi Combines	Ilaiyaraaja	Karthik, Radha Ravi, Sripriya, Sri Bharathi, Senthil
Neethana Antha Kuyil	R. Selvaraj	Kaladharshan Films	Ilaiyaraaja	Raja, Ranjini
Nilave Malare	S. A. Chandrasekhar	Saj Productions	M. S. Viswanathan	Nadhiya, Rahman, Rajesh, Baby Shalini, Manorama, Senthil
Odangal	Ameerjan	P. S. V. Pictures	Sampath Selvam	Sanjay Kumar, Naveena, Radha Ravi, Manorama
Oomai Vizhigal	R. Aravindraj	Thirai Chirpi	Manoj–Gyan; Aabavanan	Vijayakanth, Jaishankar, Arun Pandian, Saritha, Chandrasekhar, Srividya, Visu, Ilavarasi, Senthil
Oru Iniya Udhayam	R. Selvam	Pandu Cine Arts	Manoj–Gyan	Vijayakanth, Amala, Vijayakumar, Janagaraj
Oru Manithan Oru Manaivi	Durai	S. D. Creation	Shankar–Ganesh	Suresh, Ashok, Sumithra
Paadum Paravaigal	Vamsy	Ramkumar Productions	Ilaiyaraaja	Karthik, Bhanupriya
Padikkatha Padam	Bharath	M. L. M. Creation	T. S. Raghavender	Bharathi, Viji
Palaivana Rojakkal	Manivannan	Poompuhar Production	Ilaiyaraaja	Prabhu, Sathyaraj, Nalini, Lakshmi, Suhasini
Panneer Nadhigal	M. Bhaskar	Oscar Movies	Shankar–Ganesh	Sivakumar, Amala, Jeevitha, Nizhalgal Ravi, Jayashree, S. S. Chandran, Senthil, Baby Meena
Paaru Paaru Pattanam Paaru	Manobala	Kalaimani Movies	Ilaiyaraaja	Mohan, Ranjini, Kuyili
Piranthaen Valarnthaen	Vijayasingam	Dhandayudhapani Films	Shankar–Ganesh	Goundamani, Jeevitha, S. Ve. Shekher, Rajeev, Soorya, Brindha, Senthil
Poi Mugangal	C. V. Rajendran	Preethi Creations	Shankar–Ganesh	Rakesh, Sulakshana
Pookkalai Parikkatheergal	V. Azhagappan	Sri Raja Kaliamman Movies	T. Rajendar	Suresh, Nadhiya, Rajeev, S. S. Chandran, Senthil, Manorama
Pudhiya Poovithu	Surya	Golden Moon Creations	Kannan	Raja, Ramya Krishnan, Senthil, Kovai Sarala
Punnagai Mannan	K. Balachander	Kavithalayaa Productions	Ilaiyaraaja	Kamal Haasan, Revathi, Srividya, Rekha
Puthir	S. Siddalingaiah	Kamadhenu Art Productions	Ilaiyaraaja	Murali, Sandhya, Asha Latha
Raja Nee Vaazhga	C. V. Rajendran	Garuda Films	K. Ravi	Prabhu, Ambika, Sathyaraj, Nizhalgal Ravi, Anuradha
Rasigan Oru Rasigai	Balu Anand	Vasan Productions	Raveendran	Sathyaraj, Ambika, Jaishankar, Goundamani, Senthil
Revathi	Sundar K. Vijayan	J. V. Movies	Shankar–Ganesh	Revathi, Suresh
Saadhanai	A. S. Pragasam	Pragaas Productions	Ilaiyaraaja	Sivaji Ganesan, K. R. Vijaya, Prabhu, Nalini, Y. G. Mahendra
Samsaram Adhu Minsaram	Visu	AVM Productions	Shankar–Ganesh	Visu, Lakshmi, Raghuvaran, Chandrasekhar, Kismu, Manorama, Madhuri, Ilavarasi, Kamala Kamesh
Sarvam Sakthimayam	P. R. Somasundar	Preethi Indar Combines	Ben Surender	Rajesh, Sudha Chandran, S. Ve. Shekher, Ramya Krishnan, Manorama, Radha Ravi
Selvaakku	M. A. Kaja	R. G. Combines	Chandrabose	Chandrasekhar, Radha Ravi, Sulakshana, Soorya, Sri Sailaja, Janagaraj
Sigappu Malargal	S. A. Chandrasekhar	Vidhya Creations	M. S. Viswanathan	Vijayakanth, Sulakshana, S. S. Chandran
Solai Pushpangal	Ramarajan	Sri Thenandal Films	Shankar–Ganesh	Chandrasekhar, Jeevitha, Ramarajan
Thaaiku Oru Thaalaattu	Balachandra Menon	K. R. G. Film Circuit	Ilaiyaraaja	Sivaji Ganesan, Padmini, Sujatha, Pandiarajan, Visu, Ilavarasi, Rohini, Rajyalakshmi
Thalaiyatti Bommaigal	K. Natraj	Appu Movies	Gangai Amaran	Goundamani, Ilavarasi, Radha Ravi, Kalpana, Senthil
Thazhuvatha Kaigal	R. Sundarrajan	Swarnaambika Movies	Ilaiyaraaja	Vijayakanth, Ambika, Senthil, Anuradha
Thodarum Uravu		Thamayanthi Films	Gangai Amaran	Karthik, Urvashi
Unakkaagave Vaazhgiren	K. Rangaraj	Krishnalaya Productions	Ilaiyaraaja	Sivakumar, Nadhiya, Suresh, Menaka, Senthil
Unnai Ondru Ketpen	Sakthi Kannan	V. M. I. Productions	V. S. Narasimhan	Mohan, Amala, Poornima Bhagyaraj
Unnidathil Naan	Arun Veerappan	Textam Productions	Thayanban	Nethaji, Nalini, Devi Lalitha
Uyire Unakkaga	K. Rangaraj	Motherland Pictures	Laxmikant–Pyarelal	Mohan, Sujatha, Nadhiya, Senthil, Kovai Sarala
Vasantha Raagam	S. A. Chandrasekhar	V. V. Creations	M. S. Viswanathan	Vijayakanth, Rahman, Sudha Chandran, S. A. Chandrasekhar
Vidinja Kalyanam	Manivannan	Vivekanandha Pictures	Ilaiyaraaja	Sathyaraj, Raveendran, Vijayakumar, Sujatha, Jayashree, Senthil
Viduthalai	K. Vijayan	Sujatha Cine Arts	Chandrabose	Sivaji Ganesan, Rajinikanth, Madhavi, Vishnuvardhan, Anuradha
Vikram	Rajasekhar	Raaj Kamal Films International	Ilaiyaraaja	Kamal Haasan, Dimple Kapadia, Lizzy, Ambika, Sathyaraj, Amjad Khan, Janagaraj
Yaaro Ezhuthiya Kavithai	C. V. Sridhar	Durga Bagavathy Films	Anand Shankar	Sivakumar, Rajesh, Jayashree, Thengai Srinivasan, Kovai Sarala
