= En Vazhi Thani Vazhi =

En Vazhi Thani Vazhi (lit. 'My way is a unique way') may refer to:

- En Vazhi Thani Vazhi (1988 film)
- En Vazhi Thani Vazhi (2015 film)
