= Muddula Menalludu =

- Theatrical release poster
- Directed by: Kodi Ramakrishna
- Written by: Ganesh Patro (dialogues)
- Screenplay by: Kodi Ramakrishna
- Story by: V. Azhagappan
- Produced by: S. Gopal Reddy
- Starring: Nandamuri Balakrishna; Vijayashanti
- Cinematography: K. S. Hari
- Edited by: Tirunavukkarasu
- Music by: K. V. Mahadevan
- Production company: Bhargav Art Productions
- Release date: 7 July 1990
- Running time: 138 minutes
- Country: India
- Language: Telugu

Muddula Menalludu is a 1990 Indian Telugu-language drama film produced by S. Gopal Reddy on Bhargav Art Productions banner and directed by Kodi Ramakrishna. It stars Nandamuri Balakrishna, Vijayashanti and the music was composed by K. V. Mahadevan. The film was a remake of Tamil film Thangamana Raasa.

== Cast ==
- Nandamuri Balakrishna as Raja
- Vijayashanti as Shanti
- Nassar as Madhava Rao
- Brahmaji as Raja's younger brother
- Vasanth as Raghu
- Prasanna Kumar as Nagaraju
- Balaji Venugopal as Subbaiyah
- Mada Venkateswara Rao as Thief
- Babu Mohan as Thief
- Jayanthi as Rajeswari Devi
- Sangeetha as Parvathi
- Kalpana Rai

== Soundtrack ==
Muddula Menalludu

Film score by K. V. Mahadevan
- Released: 1990
- Genre: Soundtrack
- Length: 25:48
- Label: Lahari Music
- Producer: K. V. Mahadevan

K. V. Mahadevan chronology
Alludugaru (1990)	Muddula Menalludu (1990)	Assembly Rowdy (1991)

Music composed by K. V. Mahadevan. Music released on Lahari Music Company.

No.	Title	Lyrics	Singer(s)	Length
1.	"Paruvala Chilakala"	Vennelakanti	S. P. Balasubrahmanyam, Chitra	4:13
2.	"Tata Cheppaloyi"	Vennelakanti	S. P. Balasubrahmanyam, S. P. Sailaja	4:13
3.	"Pandagochenamma"	C. Narayana Reddy	S. P. Balasubrahmanyam, Chitra	4:51
4.	"Mutyala Pandirilo"	Vennelakanti	S. P. Balasubrahmanyam, Chitra	3:53
5.	"Noppigudhi"	Vennelakanti	S. P. Balasubrahmanyam, Chitra	4:44
6.	"Dwapara Yugamuna"	C. Narayana Reddy	S. P. Balasubrahmanyam	3:42
Total length:				25:48
