= Thangamana Raasa =

- Poster
- Directed by: V. Azhagappan
- Written by: V. Azhagappan; D. S. Balagan (dialogues)
- Produced by: Rani Azhagappan
- Starring: Ramarajan; Kanaka
- Cinematography: Ravinder
- Edited by: V. Rajagopal; S. Shankar
- Music by: Ilaiyaraaja
- Production company: Rekha Movies
- Release date: 28 October 1989
- Country: India
- Language: Tamil

Thangamana Raasa is a 1989 Indian Tamil-language drama film directed and co-written by V. Azhagappan. The film stars Ramarajan and Kanaka. It was released on 28 October 1989. The film was remade in Telugu as Muddula Menalludu (1990).

== Plot ==
Vinu Chakravarthy gets cheated by his brother and loses his money, following which a quarrel erupts between them and Vinu Chakravarthy accidentally kills his brother out of anger. Vinu Chakravarthy is sentenced to life imprisonment. Ramarajan is Vinu Chakravarthy's only son. Rajeev is Vinu Chakravarthy's brother's son. Rajeev gets furious knowing about his father's death and vows to take revenge by killing Vinu Chakravarthy. Rajeev also develops enmity with Ramarajan.

However, Ramarajan is kind-hearted and wants to make peace with his cousin Rajeev. Kanaka is Ramarajan's niece and she falls in love with him for which Ramarajan also reciprocates. Rajeev does not want Kanaka to marry Ramarajan and attempts to disrupt their relationship. Rajeev's sister falls in love with a school teacher. Ramarajan finds this and has her marry her lover which angers Rajeev.

Vinu Chakravarthy gets released from jail completing his life time imprisonment. Rajeev also goes to Chennai with plans of killing Vinu Chakrvarthy as soon as he is released from prison. Ramarajan finds about Rajeev's plans and tries to save his father. But unexpectedly, Rajeev meets with an accident in Chennai. Ramarajan and Vinu Chakrvarthy see this and immediately admit him in a nearby hospital following which Rajeev is saved. Knowing this, Rajeev feels guilty and understands the good nature of Ramarajan and Vinu Chakravarthy. Ramarajan gets united with Kanaka.

== Cast ==
- Ramarajan as Thangarasu
- Kanaka as Kannamma
- Goundamani as Subaiya (Subramani)
- Senthil as Alagusundaram
- Vinu Chakravarthy as Chinna karuppan
- Gandhimathi as Kamatchi
- Sudha as Kalyani
- Rajeev as Kaliappan
- K. R. Savithri as Thangarasu Mother
- Raasi as Chandra
- Yuvasri as Radha
- Ganga

== Production ==
After Azhagappan's En Vazhi Thani Vazhi (1988) failed at the box-office due to which he suffered losses, Ramarajan agreed to give callsheets to help him.

== Soundtrack ==
The music was composed by Ilaiyaraaja, with lyrics by Gangai Amaran.

Song	Singers	Lyrics
"Kanne En Karmugile"	Ilaiyaraaja, K. S. Chithra	Gangai Amaran
"Karpudaiya Aambalainga"	S. P. Balasubrahmanyam	Gangai Amaran
"Sokku Podi Vachirukken"	S. Janaki, Arunmozhi	Gangai Amaran
"Thenmadurai Seemaiyile"	K. S. Chithra	Gangai Amaran
"Vathiya Isai" (Instrumental)	-	Ilaiyaraaja

== Release and reception ==
Thangamaana Raasa was released on 28 October 1989 on the occasion of Diwali alongside another Ramarajan starrer Anbu Kattalai. Despite facing competition from other Diwali releases such as Mappillai, Vettri Vizhaa, Rajanadai, Dharmam Vellum, Dravidan and Vaathiyaar Veettu Pillai, it became profitable at the box-office. P. S. S. of Kalki praised the performances of the cast and Ilaiyaraaja's music.
