= Pookkalai Parikkatheergal =

- Poster
- Directed by: V. Azhagappan
- Written by: Es. N. Ravi (dialogues)
- Story by: V. Azhagappan
- Produced by: Mohan Natrajan; Tharangai V. Shanmugam
- Starring: Suresh; Nadhiya
- Cinematography: K. B. Dayalan
- Edited by: V. Rajagopal
- Music by: T. Rajendar
- Production company: Sri Rajakaaliamman Movies
- Release date: 29 May 1986
- Country: India
- Language: Tamil

Pookkalai Parikkatheergal (transl. Don't pluck the flowers) is a 1986 Indian Tamil-language romantic drama film directed by V. Azhagappan. The film stars Suresh and Nadhiya, with Rajeev and Vinu Chakravarthy in supporting roles, with music composed by T. Rajendar. It was released on 29 May 1986.

== Cast ==
- Suresh
- Nadhiya
- Vinu Chakravarthy
- Rajeev
- V. K. Ramasamy
- S. S. Chandran
- Senthil
- Manorama
- Ganesh (cameo appearance in song "Pookkala Than")

== Production ==
Pookkalai Parikkathirgal is the first film produced by Mohan Natarajan. The dialogues for the film were written by lyricist Ponniyin Selvan who was credited as Es. N. Ravi. Anuja Reddy was offered to act in the film but declined. The film was shot in Ooty, Munnar and Kodaikanal.

== Soundtrack ==
The soundtrack was composed by T. Rajendar who also wrote the lyrics. The song "Kadhal Oorvalam" is set to the raga Jog. The songs "Pookalai Than", "Maalai Ennai" and "Ammadi Chinna" attained popularity.

Track listing
No.	Title	Singer(s)	Length
1.	"Maane Thene"	S. P. Balasubrahmanyam	4:12
2.	"Kadhal Oorvalam"	S. P. Balasubrahmanyam, K. S. Chithra	5:04
3.	"Adiye Vanitha"	S. P. Balasubrahmanyam, P. Susheela, S. Janaki	4:41
4.	"Adi Ammadi"	K. S. Chithra	4:55
5.	"Maalai Ennai Vaattuthu"	S. P. Balasubrahmanyam, S. Janaki	4:14
6.	"Pookkalaithan"	Malaysia Vasudevan	4:15
Total length:			27:21

== Reception ==
The film was released alongside Kamal Haasan starrer Vikram and ran for 100 days. Jayamanmadhan of Kalki praised the performances of cast, Rajendar's music and Dayalan's cinematography and concluded that the film's director Azhagappan skilfully weaves together tasteful incidents, without slackening till the end. Balumani of Anna praised cinematography and direction. The film was a success, and Rajender won the Cinema Express Award for Best Music Director; while the announcement of the winners for the 7th Cinema Express Awards mentioned his winning was for this film and Mythili Ennai Kaathali, during the presentation only the latter film was mentioned.
