= Thunai =

- Theatrical release poster
- Directed by: Durai
- Screenplay by: Durai
- Story by: Naagai Dharuman
- Produced by: Durai
- Starring: Sivaji Ganesan; Saritha; M. G. Chakrapani; Suresh
- Cinematography: V. Ranga
- Edited by: M. Vellaichamy; R. Krishnamurthy
- Music by: Shankar–Ganesh
- Production company: Prakash Pictures
- Release date: 4 September 1982
- Country: India
- Language: Tamil

Thunai (transl. Support) is a 1982 Indian Tamil-language drama film, produced and directed by Durai. The film stars Sivaji Ganesan, Saritha, M. G. Chakrapani and Suresh. It was released on 1 October 1982.

== Plot ==
Dasaratharaman is an easy-going widower with a grown son, Raghuraman. He works as a sub-registrar, and his jovial nature earns him the friendship of nearly everyone he meets. In the house near where he lives, a poor family consisting of a widowed mother and several children resides. Vidhya is the sole breadwinner of the family, while her younger brother Vijay is looking for a job. Her older brother left the home after a love marriage and is struggling financially. She also has a younger sister, Nandhini, and another younger brother. Dasaratharaman makes it a point to look out for Vidhya as they take the same train to their respective jobs.

Vijay introduces Moorthy to his family as a relative of a friend, and he quickly endears himself to everyone. He promises to help both brothers find jobs and proposes marriage to Vidhya. To the family's joy, the two marry, with Dasaratharaman presiding.

Raghuraman is in love with his colleague, Radha, a determined woman with a forceful personality. Dasaratharaman, unaware of this, asks his friend, VKR, to find a bride for his son. Raghuram plots to trick his father into choosing Radha as his bride, but bad timing ruins his plan. Unaware of his identity, Radha is rude to Dasaratharaman in a bid to put off a marriage she doesn't want. Worried that he will never approve, she pushes Raghuraman to marry her in secret. Dasaratharaman learns this and arrives in time to see the wedding.

Moorthy, meanwhile, turns out to be a wanted criminal who tricks women into marriage to steal their jewellery. He is arrested, and Vidhya's marriage is annulled, leaving her humiliated. When both of her brothers need cash to get a job, Vidhya helps her oldest brother, causing a fracture in the family. The rest of the family moves out, leaving her alone. Feeling guilty for presiding over the marriage, Dasaratharaman keeps an eye on her.

Radha and Dasaratharaman clash repeatedly. Unable to get over the circumstances of his son's marriage, he makes sly comments disparaging Radha to everyone. Radha, in retaliation, is rude to him and insinuates about his relationship with Vidhya. Matters come to a head when Raghuraman learns of Radha's behaviour towards his father, and Radha requests that Dasaratharaman leave the home.

In the end, when Vidhya suggests that they should get married as they both need a companion and have no one, they go to the registrar's office only for Vidhya to find out that he had arranged to adopt her, much to the shock of Dasaratharaman's family.

== Cast ==
- Sivaji Ganesan as Dasaratharaman
- Saritha as Vidhya
- Suresh as Raghuraman
- Radha as Radha
- V. K. Ramasamy as VKR
- Rajeev as Moorthy
- Dilip as Vijay
- Sukumari as Radha's mother
- S. N. Parvathy

== Soundtrack ==
The soundtrack was composed by Shankar–Ganesh and lyrics were written by Vaali.

Track listing
| No. | Title | Lyrics | Singer(s) | Length |
|---|---|---|---|---|
| 1. | "Kaatru Nadanthadu" | Pulamaipithan | P. Jayachandran, Vani Jairam | 5:40 |
| 2. | "Adei Unakkum" | Vaali | T. M. Soundararajan | 4:34 |
| 3. | "Anbe Thunai" | Poonguyilan | Malaysia Vasudevan | 3:56 |
| 4. | "Life is a Game" | Vaali | Sundarrajan, Viveksarathy, Mohan, Latha, Kousalya, Sakthi, Shanmugam, Manimala | 5:19 |
| Total length: | | | | 19:29 |

== Critical reception ==
Thiraignani of Kalki praised the acting of Ganesan and Radha and dialogues of Vietnam Veedu Sundaram and concluded Sundaram's dialogues are a support for this plot, Durai's hardwork is a support for dialogues, fans are support for Durai and for fans excitement is support. Balumani of Anna praised the performances of the cast, Ramasamy's humour, Shankar-Ganesh's music and called it a film which can be watched with family.
