= Kunguma Kodu =

- Title logo
- Directed by: V. Azhagappan
- Written by: M. P. Thangarajan; Umashankar
- Screenplay by: V. Azhagappan
- Story by: V. Azhagappan
- Produced by: N. M. Indira
- Starring: Mohan; Suresh; Nalini; Ramya Krishnan
- Cinematography: K. B. Dayalan
- Edited by: V. Rajagopal; P. Mohanraj
- Music by: S. A. Rajkumar
- Production company: Mahesh Productions
- Release date: 19 February 1988
- Country: India
- Language: Tamil

Kunguma Kodu (transl. Line of kumkum) is a 1988 Indian Tamil-language film, directed by V. Azhagappan. The film stars Mohan, Nalini, Suresh and Ramya Krishnan. It was released on 19 February 1988.

== Cast ==
- Mohan
- Suresh
- Nalini
- Ramya Krishnan
- Senthil

== Soundtrack ==
The music was composed by S. A. Rajkumar. Azhagappan chose him to compose the music after he was impressed by his songs from Chinna Poove Mella Pesu.

Song	Singers	Length
"Hey! Radhaye"	S. P. Balasubrahmanyam, Vidya and chorus	03:32
"Thamarai Poovithazh"	S. P. Balasubrahmanyam, K. S. Chithra	04:44
"Thalattum Nilavukku"	S. P. Balasubrahmanyam	05:20
"Vaanam Kotuthu Veliye"	S. P. Balasubrahmanyam, K. S. Chithra	04:22
"Thendral Adikuthu Sindhu Pirakuthu" (Muppathu Mukkodi)	S. P. Balasubrahmanyam, K. S. Chithra	04:03
"Chinnanchiru Malare"	S. P. Balasubrahmanyam, Baby Sujatha	04:37

== Reception ==
According to writer Sura, who was the film's public relations officer, the film failed at the box office due to its delayed release.
