= Piranthaen Valarnthaen =

- Theatrical release poster
- Directed by: Vijayasingam
- Written by: Vietnam Veedu Sundaram
- Produced by: C. Dhandayuthapani
- Starring: Goundamani
- Cinematography: S. R. Govindan
- Edited by: M. G. Balurao
- Music by: Shankar–Ganesh
- Production company: Dhandayuthapani Films
- Release date: 1 October 1986
- Country: India
- Language: Tamil

Piranthaen Valarnthaen (transl. I was Born, I Grew Up) is a 1986 Indian Tamil-language film directed by Vijayasingam and written by Vietnam Veedu Sundaram, starring Goundamani. It was released on 1 October 1986.

== Plot ==
Goundamani was sold to Senthamarai and later deserted by his parents as a newborn. The nurse adopts the deserted baby, and he grows up in the nurse's family with her son, S. V. Shekhar. Jeevitha, SV Sekhar's sister, plays Goundamani's love interest. Goundamani is now a street-smart, clever, and cunning young man.

Years later, unaware of this, Goundamani goes to work for his own father, who is now a rich businessman and whose business rival turns out to be Senthamarai. Son and father band together and take on the villain Senthamarai. When he becomes aware of the past, he cleverly plays one against the other, taking revenge on his birth and adoptive father for abandoning him.

== Cast ==
- Goundamani
- Jeevitha
- S. Ve. Shekher
- Rajeev
- Senthamarai
- Kallapetti Singaram
- Senthil

== Production ==
The scene where Goundamani's character gets married was shot at Kundrathur Temple.

== Soundtrack ==
The soundtrack was composed by Shankar–Ganesh and lyrics by Vaali.

Track listing
No.	Title	Singer(s)	Length
1.	"Maavu Araikka Santhanam"	Malaysia Vasudevan & S. P. Sailaja
2.	"Elaso Elaso Ethutha Vayasu"	Malaysia Vasudevan & S. Janaki
3.	"Thalaya Pathachu Elaya Pootachu"	Raj Seetharaman & Vani Jairam
4.	"Manikka Villeduthu Maniyana"	Raj Seetharaman & Sagiri

== Reception ==
Jayamanmadhan (a duo) of Kalki felt Goundamani's decision to act as lead actor was both gutsy and a wrong calculation, and he completely looked lost in emotional and romantic scenes. Jayamanmadhan was critical of the film's cinematography, wondering whether the issue is with the camera or the film, and dismissed Shankar–Ganesh's music as loud while concluding that S. Ve. Sekhar and Rajeev were underutilised.
