= Urangatha Ninaivugal =

- Directed by: R. Bhaskaran
- Story by: Shanmugapriyan
- Produced by: R. Bhaskaran
- Starring: Sivakumar; Menaka; Rajeev; Radhika
- Cinematography: Balu Mahendra
- Edited by: R. Bhaskaran
- Music by: Ilaiyaraaja
- Production company: Sugandhavani Films
- Release date: 24 February 1983
- Country: India
- Language: Tamil

Urangatha Ninaivugal (transl. Dreams which don't sleep) is a 1983 Indian Tamil-language film directed by R. Bhaskaran. The film stars Sivakumar, Menaka, Rajeev and Radhika. It was released on 24 February 1983.

== Cast ==
- Sivakumar as Rishi
- Menaka as Uma
- Rajeev as Bharath
- Radhika as Gowri
- Silk Smitha as Pownu
- Y. G. Mahendran as Raghavan
- Sathyaraj as Amar
- Poornam Viswanathan as Uma's father

== Soundtrack ==
Soundtrack was composed by Ilaiyaraaja, with lyrics by M. G. Vallabhan. The song "Narumana Malargalin" is set in Vagadheeswari raga.

Song	Singers
Artha Rathiri	S. Janaki
Mouname Nenjil I	K. J. Yesudas
Mouname Nenjil II	Ilaiyaraaja, K. J. Yesudas
Narumana Malargalin	S. Janaki
Paadu Pattu	P.Susheela, Deepan Chakravarthy, Malaysia Vasudevan
