= Irandil Ondru =

- Title card
- Directed by: V. Azhagappan
- Written by: S. S. Maniyan (dialogues)
- Screenplay by: V. Azhagappan
- Story by: V. Azhagappan
- Produced by: S. P. Tamizharasi
- Starring: Ramki; Nadhiya; Raghuvaran; Madhuri
- Cinematography: Babu
- Edited by: V. Rajagopal
- Music by: Ilaiyaraaja
- Production company: S. P. T. Films
- Release date: 4 March 1988
- Country: India
- Language: Tamil

Irandil Ondru (transl. One of two) is a 1988 Tamil-language film directed by V. Azhagappan, starring Ramki, Nadhiya and Raghuvaran. It was released on 4 March 1988.

== Cast ==
- Ramki
- Nadiya
- Raghuvaran
- Madhuri
- Jaishankar
- Rajeev
- S. S. Chandran
- Senthil

== Soundtrack ==
Soundtrack was composed by Ilaiyaraaja.

Song	Singers	Lyrics
"Naarinil Poo"	Ilaiyaraaja, K. S. Chithra	Piraisoodan
"Sangeetha Poo"	Mano, K. S. Chithra	Panchu Arunachalam
"Thanga Kudam"	Malaysia Vasudevan	Panchu Arunachalam
"Inge Ellarum Nallavanga	Malaysia Vasudevan	Panchu Arunachalam
"Kadhalukku Thoodhu"	K. S. Chithra	Panchu Arunachalam
"Manamadurai"	B. S. Sasirekha	Gangai Amaran
"Oru Veetti Vantha Sela	K. S. Chithra, Mano	Gangai Amaran
"Poovukku Poo"	Kausalya	Gangai Amaran
"Dharmarukku Pin"	Kausalya	Gangai Amaran

== Release ==
The film was initially denied a certificate by the Central Board of Film Certification for portraying "police force in a bad light". The film did not do well at box-office.
