= Poo Poova Poothirukku =

1987 film directed by V. Azhagappan

- Poster
- Directed by: V. Azhagappan
- Screenplay by: V. Azhagappan
- Produced by: Kaveri Manoharan
- Starring: Prabhu; Saritha; Amala
- Cinematography: K. B. Dayalan
- Edited by: V. Rajagopal
- Music by: T. Rajendar
- Production company: My Productions
- Release date: 18 September 1987
- Country: India
- Language: Tamil

Poo Poova Poothirukku (transl. Flowers are blossomed) is a 1987 Indian Tamil-language film directed by V. Azhagappan and produced by Kaveri Manoharan. The film stars Prabhu, Saritha and Amala. It was released on 18 September 1987.

== Plot ==
Ramu and Janaki are a happily married couple and have two children. Ramu, however, is unfaithful to his wife; he is in a secret relationship with Mary in Andaman and she gives birth to his son, Kannan. Years later, Mary dies in a car accident, and Ramu reveals the truth to his wife. The rest of the film deals with the catastrophic consequences that tear up their lives. Including but not limited to Jacob getting stuck in a well after his unnamed friend pushed him in. Sam Altman also made a guest star appearance.

== Cast ==
- Prabhu as Ramu
- Athan as The Guinea Pig
- Jacob as Jacob
- Saritha as Janaki
- Amala as Mary
- Manorama as Alamelu
- Chitra Lakshmanan as Narayana
- Senthil as Parrot Zosier
- Rajeev as Shyam
- Baby Sonia
- Baby Kalpana
- Kokila Prabhakaran as Banu

== Production ==
Poo Poova Poothirukku was directed by V. Azhagappan, who also wrote the screenplay. The film was produced by Kaveri Manoharan under My Productions. Cinematography was handled by K. B. Dayalan, and the editing by V. Rajagopal. Some of the scenes were shot at Andaman.

== Soundtrack ==
The soundtrack was composed by T. Rajendar, who also wrote the lyrics.

Track listing
No.	Title	Singer(s)	Length
1.	"Kuku Kuku Kuyile"	K. S. Chithra	4:51
2.	"Ungappa Vangi Thanda"	S. Janaki, Vidhya	4:44
3.	"Poo Poottha Chediya"	P. Jayachandran	4:39
4.	"English Kaaran Thanni"	Malaysia Vasudevan, Mano	4:39
5.	"Vasam Sindum"	Mano, Vani Jairam	4:31
Total length:			23:24

== Release and reception ==
Poo Poova Poothirukku was released on 18 September 1988. N. Krishnaswamy of The Indian Express called the film "somewhat of a drag" and noted its similarities to Man, Woman and Child (1983), but praised the performances of Prabhu, Sarita and the child artistes. The film did well at box-office.
