= Thanga Thamaraigal =

- Title card
- Directed by: V. Azhagappan
- Story by: G. Arunachalam
- Starring: Arjun; Rupini
- Cinematography: Ravindhar
- Music by: Ilaiyaraaja
- Production company: Gangai Film Circuit
- Release date: 23 March 1991
- Running time: 135 minutes
- Country: India
- Language: Tamil

Thanga Thamaraigal (transl. Golden lotuses) is a 1991 Indian Tamil language drama film, directed by V. Azhagappan and produced by Gangai Film Circuit. The film stars Arjun and Rupini. It was released on 23 March 1991.

== Cast ==
- Arjun as Ram
- Rupini as Latha
- Ilavarasi
- Janagaraj
- Livingston as Sathish
- Swaminathan as Moorthy

== Soundtrack ==
The soundtrack was composed by Ilaiyaraaja.

| Song | Singer(s) | Lyrics |
|---|---|---|
| "Kutta Kutta" | Malaysia Vasudevan | Vaali |
| "Deviye Naan Saranam" | S. P. Balasubrahmanyam, K. S. Chithra | Kamakodiyan |
| "Kadhalichi Paar Kiliye" | Malaysia Vasudevan | Gangai Amaran |
| "Vachuvidava" | Mano | Vaali |
| "Naiyara Pennin Manam" | K. S. Chithra | Vaali |
| "Maamane Paaru" | Chorus | Kamakodiyan |
