= Aagaya Thamaraigal =

1985 film

- Title card
- Directed by: V. Azhagappan
- Written by: V. Azhagappan; E. S. N. Ravi (dialogues)
- Produced by: R. Sreedhar
- Starring: Suresh; Revathi
- Cinematography: RNK Prasad
- Edited by: V. Rajagopal
- Music by: Gangai Amaran
- Production company: Yuvaraj Productions
- Release date: 15 August 1985
- Country: India
- Language: Tamil

Aagaya Thamaraigal (transl. Sky Lotuses) is a 1985 Indian Tamil-language film directed by V. Azhagappan, starring Suresh and Revathi. It was released on 15 August 1985, and did well at the box office.

== Cast ==
- Suresh
- Revathi
- Sathyaraj
- Jai Ganesh
- Goundamani
- S. V. Venkataraman
- Manorama
- Mohana Priya
- Rajini
- S. S. Chandran
- Mohan
- Senthil

== Soundtrack ==
Soundtrack was composed by Gangai Amaran.

Track listing
No.	Title	Singer(s)	Length
1.	"Anandam"	Malaysia Vasudevan, S. P. Sailaja
2.	"Mayanguthe"	S. Janaki
3.	"Potta Potti"	Malaysia Vasudevan, Vani Jairam
4.	"Gettikaari"	S. P. Sailaja
5.	"Kannoram"	Gangai Amaran

== Reception ==
Kalki wrote suspecting that if he tells a love story as it is, it will go unnoticed, he has acted as if he has told a novel story along with sensational colors like armored police and tear gas. In that sense, the director is brilliant.
