= Swathi Chinukulu =

- LP Vinyl Records Cover
- Directed by: Sri Chakravarthy
- Written by: Sathyanand (Dialogues)
- Produced by: T. Pratap and Kanta Rao
- Starring: Vanisri; Ramya Krishnan; Suresh; Jayasudha; Sarath Babu
- Cinematography: V. Ranga
- Music by: Ilaiyaraaja
- Release date: 11 August 1989
- Language: Telugu

Swathi Chinukulu is a 1989 Indian Telugu-language drama film directed by Sri Chakravarthy for producer T. Prasad and Kanta Rao, starring Vanisri, Ramya Krishnan, Sarath Babu, Suresh and Jayasudha.

== Cast ==
- Vanisri
- Ramya Krishnan
- Suresh
- Jayasudha
- Sarath Babu
- Giri Babu
- Gollapudi Maruthi Rao
- Suthi Velu
- Sakshi Ranga Rao
- K. K. Sharma

== Soundtrack ==
Swathi Chinukulu

Film score by Illayaraja
- Genre: Feature film soundtrack
- Length: 21:07
- Label: Aditya Music

The music composed by Ilaiyaraaja.

Song	Singers	Writer(s)
"Cham Cham"	Mano	Veturi
"Maa Kanti Paapa"	P. Susheela	Veturi
"Ninnu Kannaa"	S. Janaki, Mano	Veturi
"Oh My Love"	S. Janaki, S. P. Balasubrahmanyam	Veturi
"Midisi Midisi"	S. Janaki, Mano	Veturi

== Reception ==
Griddaaluru Gopalrao writing for Zamin Ryot on 18 August 1989, opined that though the director has come up with a new storyline, the film overall fails to create magic.

== Awards ==
Nandi Awards

- 1989 - Best Supporting Actress - Jayasudha
