= En Veedu En Kanavar =

- Directed by: Senbaga Raman
- Written by: Senbaga Raman
- Produced by: M. S. Gopinath
- Starring: Suresh; Nadhiya
- Cinematography: M. Kesavan
- Edited by: V. Rajagopal
- Music by: B. Surendar
- Production company: Preethi Indhar Combines
- Release date: 13 April 1990
- Country: India
- Language: Tamil

En Veedu En Kanavar (transl. My house, my husband), (also known as Manaiviyai Kaadali before release) is a 1990 Indian Tamil language romantic drama film directed by Senbaga Raman. The film stars Suresh and Nadhiya, while Rajiv and Manorama appeared in other pivotal roles. This was the debut for Ajith Kumar who was briefly featured for a song sequence. It was released on 13 April 1990.

== Cast ==
- Suresh as Raja
- Nadhiya as Radha
- Rajiv as Kumar
- Manorama
- Madhuri
- Senthil
- S. S. Chandran
- Jai Ganesh
- Delhi Ganesh
- Ajith Kumar as a school student in the song "En Kanmani"

== Production ==
The film's production as well as censoring completed in 1988 and its initial title was Manaiviyae Kaathali, but was released only in 1990. Ajith Kumar plays a school boy in the song "En Kanmani", and thus it became his first appearance onscreen.

== Soundtrack ==
The soundtrack was composed by B. Surender.

Track listing
No.	Title	Lyrics	Singer(s)	Length
1.	"En Kanmani Pon Mangani"	Vairamuthu	P. Jayachandran
2.	"Aasai Mugame"	Vaali	Vani Jairam
3.	"My Dear My Dear"	Kamakodiyan	Malaysia Vasudevan, Mano
4.	"Radha Radha Kanne Radha"	Muthulingam	P. Jayachandran, P. Susheela
5.	"Aadum Pothum Paadum Pothum"	R. E. Chandrasekar	S. P. Balasubrahmanyam
