= Sigappu Malargal =

- Directed by: S. A. Chandrasekhar
- Written by: S. A. Chandrasekhar
- Produced by: S. J. Dhanasekaran
- Starring: Suresh; Gayatri
- Cinematography: M. Kesavan
- Edited by: D. Shyam Mukerji
- Music by: M. S. Viswanathan
- Production company: Vidya Creations
- Release date: 21 November 1986
- Country: India
- Language: Tamil

Sigappu Malargal (transl. Red Flowers) is a 1986 Indian Tamil-language film, written and directed by S. A. Chandrasekhar. The film stars Suresh and Gayatri. It was released on 21 November 1986.

== Cast ==
- Suresh as Vijay
- Gayatri as Gayatri
- Jaishankar
- Sripriya
- Chandrasekhar
- Charle
- Senthil

== Soundtrack ==
Music was composed by M. S. Viswanathan, with lyrics by Vaali.

Song name	Singers
"Oru Bommalaattam"	K. J. Yesudas
"Naan Unakku"	S. Janaki
"Meendum Santhippom"	S. P. Balasubrahmanyam
"Mutthamitta"	S.N. Surendar, Dr Kalyan, Chitra
"Vettiduven"	Malaysia Vasudevan & Balachandran
"Naan Unakku"	S. Janaki

== Reception ==
The Indian Express criticised Chandrasekhar's direction and also wrote "The only saving grace of this enormously clichéd film is that Chandrasekharan gives it an unexpected twist or two. But all this is washed away in a flood of cliches". Jayamanmadhan (a duo) of Kalki wrote that there was no yawning from start to end, so they thanked Chandrasekhar. Balumani of Anna praised acting, music, cinematography and noted the film's first half moves like a quiet stream and latter half goes swiftly but loses pace after Chandrasekar's character dies and panned the lengthy climax.
