= Urimai =

- Title card
- Directed by: Rama Narayanan
- Written by: Ramanarayanan
- Produced by: G. Kala
- Starring: Suresh; Nalini
- Cinematography: N. K. Viswanathan
- Edited by: K. Gowthaman
- Music by: Ilaiyaraaja
- Release date: 15 March 1985
- Country: India
- Language: Tamil

Urimai (transl. Rights) is a 1985 Indian Tamil-language film directed by Rama Narayanan starring Suresh and Nalini. It was released on 15 March 1985.

== Plot ==
Suresh is the only child of the rich businessman Maragathammal. He's a womanizer and a general wastrel that wanders aimlessly with his uncle as his accomplice. Maragathammal has given up hope of Suresh ever making anything of himself. Rani is a poor teacher that catches Suresh's wandering eye. Initially, his interest is superficial but he soon falls in love with her and she reciprocates. The two marry but are treated with skepticism by Maragathammal. Rani eventually wins over her mother-in-law but tragedy strikes soon after when the couple are in a car accident. Rani is presumed dead, along with Suresh's dog, Raja. A heartbroken Suresh is thrown into confusion when not one but two women claiming to be Rani show up after surviving the crash.

== Cast ==
- Suresh as Suresh
- Nalini as Rani / Clara
- M. N. Rajam as Maragathammal
- Radha Ravi as Kannaayiram
- Srikanth as Kaali
- S. S. Chandran as Suresh's uncle
- Vennira Aadai Moorthy as Manager
- Senthil as Ambulimama

== Production ==
The filming began at Ooty where three fight sequences and three song sequences were shot.

== Soundtrack ==
The music was composed by Ilaiyaraaja.

Song	Singers	Lyrics
"Kurukku Nikuthu"	Malaysia Vasudevan, S. P. Sailaja	Vairamuthu
"Anbe Anbe Neeye Enthan"	K. S. Chithra	Vaali
"Malare Nalamaa"	K. J. Yesudas, S. Janaki	Pulamaipithan
"Maalai Vanthathum"	Malaysia Vasudevan	Gangai Amaran
"Mottuthaan Ithu Ithu"	S. Janaki	
