= Aankalai Nambathey =

1987 film directed by K. Alex Pandian

- Poster
- Directed by: K. Alex Pandian
- Based on: Oru Murai Than Pookkum by Stella Bruce
- Produced by: Eshwari Subrahmanyam; Sundari Chellappan
- Starring: Pandiyan; Rekha; Ramya Krishnan
- Cinematography: Santhu Roy
- Edited by: V. Rajagopal; P. Mohanraj
- Music by: Devendran
- Production company: Vijaya Bhuvana Pictures
- Release date: 27 June 1987
- Country: India
- Language: Tamil

Aankalai Nambathey (transl. Don't trust men) is a 1987 Indian Tamil-language comedy drama film directed by K. Alex Pandian in his debut. The film stars Pandiyan, Rekha, and Ramya Krishnan. Based on the novel Oru Murai Thaan Pookkum (transl. It blooms only once) by Stella Bruce, it was released on 27 June 1987.

== Plot ==
Pannaiyar Ramasamy, the village headman, conducts a special public betrothal ceremony during the village festival so that his son, Muthupandi, gets married soon. However, after his mother's death, Muthupandi has no interest in marriage. Despite coming from a wealthy family, he departs for Ooty to take a clerk's position, hoping for a fresh start and the chance to meet a woman he might marry. Muthupandi travels with his sidekick, Sadaiyandi "Sadai," to meet his old friend Alex. Alex and his companion Amir survive on low‑paid work and occasional petty crimes. After losing Alex's address, Muthupandi and Sadai locate Alex's residence, and the four of them move into a newly rented house, with all the expenses being borne by Muthupandi.

At his job, Muthupandi becomes infatuated with Surya, the administrative officer. Working in the same office is Surya's mute friend, Anandhi. In the past, Surya once jokingly pretended to be a ghost, causing Anandhi to faint and become mute. Because of this, Anandhi's parents faced difficulty finding a suitable groom for her, and Surya feels guilty for unintentionally bringing about Anandhi's disability.

Surya tends to Muthupandi's injury, and he misreads her care as romantic affection. He asks her to read his letters for him, and this habit turns into a routine. Surya also shields him from embarrassment when he accidentally boards a women‑only bus. When Muthupandi's grandmother dies, he sets out to attend the funeral. On the way, Alex gets into a brawl to clear a roadblock set up by drunkards, causing Muthupandi to miss the final rites. His friends try to bring him and Surya together, but their efforts fail. In an attempt to spark Surya's jealousy, Muthupandi invents a fictitious girlfriend named Lalitha, writes a letter to himself in Lalitha's name, and asks Surya to read it, but she declines. Anandhi grows fond of Muthupandi, while he feels sympathy for her disability.

Meanwhile, Muthupandi becomes possessive when he sees Surya speaking on the phone with Vinod. Alex, trying to stir things up, calls Surya and claims that Lalitha is pregnant because of Muthupandi, but Surya remains uninterested. She soon discovers that no one named Lalitha exists when Muthupandi pretends to meet her, Alex phones pretending to be Lalitha, and Sadai arrives with a letter supposedly from Lalitha, all happening simultaneously. Surya asks him to meet her in person, and Muthupandi admits his feelings for Surya, but she brushes him off, explaining that she is already married to Vinod, who lives in Bombay. Heartbroken and drunk, Muthupandi stumbles onto a bus where Anandhi is a passenger and, in his intoxicated state, mistakes her for Surya. He blurts out a confession, declaring that he will marry only "her." Anandhi interprets his words as a genuine proposal and begins to love him in return.

The next morning, Muthupandi realises he has actually proposed to Anandhi instead of Surya. Overwhelmed by guilt, he quits his job, leaving Anandhi shocked. Surya, seeing Anandhi's distress, pleads with Muthupandi to marry Anandhi, but he refuses. However, Surya, emotional persuaded Muthupandi to agree to the marriage. In return, he asks Surya not to attend the wedding, fearing that her presence will make him doubt his decision to go through with marrying Anandhi.

It is now disclosed that Surya had pretended to be married to Vinod—a colleague of hers in Bombay—so that Anandhi could marry Muthupandi. Vinod, however, tries to assault Surya, claiming to be her husband. Alex, who had just returned to town to check on the wedding venue, intervenes and saves her, learning that Surya's marriage was a fabrication. Surya confesses to Alex that she, too, loved Muthupandi and was about to reveal her feelings, but after realising that Anandhi was in love with him, she chose to sacrifice her love. Determined to convey the truths, Alex rushes, but before he and Amir could reach the ceremony, Muthupandi had already tied the knot with Anandhi. At Surya's request, they agree to keep Surya's unmarried status hidden from Muthupandi forever. Surya explains that, now that Muthupandi is married to Anandhi, even if he discovers that Surya is not married, he will remain loyal to his wife because he treats women with the same respect he gave his mother.

The film concludes with Surya, still in love with Muthupandi, choosing to spend the rest of her life alone; she walks out of the wedding hall with a gentle smile.

== Cast ==
- Pandiyan as Muthupandi
- Rekha as Surya
- Ramya Krishnan as Anandhi
- Senthil as Sadaiyandi "Sadai"
- V. K. Ramasamy as Pannaiyar Ramasamy
- S. S. Chandran as the houseowner
- Loose Mohan as Kadhar, a peon
- Vinod as Vinod
- Kollangudi Karuppayi as Muthupandi's grandmother
- Varalakshmi as Anandhi's mother
- Typist Gopu as Muthupandi's colleague
- Kumarimuthu as Nallakannu, Muthupandi's colleague
- Vairam Krishnamoorthy as Anandhi's father
- Thayir Vadai Desigan as a lunatic
- Karikol Raju as a villager
- Singamuthu as Muthupandi's colleague
- Charle as Amir
- Shankar as Alex
- K. S. Ravikumar as a person at the phone booth (uncredited role)

== Production ==
Aankalai Nambathey is the directorial debut of K. Alex Pandian, who earlier assisted V. Azhagappan. The film was originally titled Yaaruminge Ramanillai. The filming was held at Ooty and Kodaikanal.

== Soundtrack ==
Soundtrack was composed by Devendran and lyrics by Vaali. Gangai Amaran was originally reported to be the composer, when the film was titled Yaaruminge Ramanillai.

Track listing
No.	Title	Singer(s)	Length
1.	"Kadhal Kaayangale"	K. J. Yesudas
2.	"Vettikatti"	S. Janaki
3.	"Thaalam Thattungal"	S. Janaki
4.	"Vaarayo Thozha"	T. M. Soundararajan
5.	"Rajathi Rajanthane"	S. P. Balasubrahmanyam
6.	"Pakku Thoppule"	S. P. Balasubrahmanyam, S. Janaki

== Reception ==
The Indian Express wrote, "Routine song-and-dance sequences riddle the film". Jayamanmadhan of Kalki wrote that if the film had been given an agility injection and fed a speed pill during the climax, then there would have been a sense of completion upon leaving the theatre. The film played for 50 days in theatres.
