= Namma Ooru Nalla Ooru =

- Poster
- Directed by: V. Azhagappan
- Screenplay by: V. Alagappan
- Story by: Raghavan Thambi
- Produced by: Siva Ramadas; K. M. Ravi; K. Muthukumaran
- Starring: Ramarajan; Rekha; Rajeev; Sulakshana
- Cinematography: P. Ganesa Pandiyan
- Edited by: V. Rajagopal; P. Mohanraj
- Music by: Gangai Amaran
- Production company: Sridevi Bahavathi Films
- Distributed by: Mangadu Amman Films; Kamini Combines
- Release date: 28 November 1986
- Running time: 128 minutes
- Country: India
- Language: Tamil

Namma Ooru Nalla Ooru (transl. Our village is a nice village) is a 1986 Indian Tamil-language film directed by V. Azhagappan. The film stars Ramarajan (in his debut in a leading role), Rekha, Rajeev and Sulakshana. It was released on 28 November 1986, and Ramarajan won the Cinema Express Award for Best New Face Actor.

== Cast ==
- Ramarajan as Ramu
- Rekha as Sita
- Rajeev
- Sulakshana
- S. S. Chandran
- Senthil
- Vinu Chakravarthy
- K. K. Soundar
- Rajavelu as Judge
- Pasi Narayanan
- 'Director' Dasarathan
- S. Ramasamy
- Manohan
- Kovai Balu
- Karunakaran
- Balraj
- Vasanthi
- Kaarai K. Balan
- Baby Saarah
- Shankar–Ganesh in a friendly appearance

== Production ==
The filming was completely held at Nagercoil and Kanyakumari for a month in August 1986.

== Soundtrack ==
Soundtrack was composed by Gangai Amaran.

Track listing
No.	Title	Lyrics	Singer(s)	Length
1.	"Singara Kaathu"	E. S. N. Ravi	Malaysia Vasudevan, K. S. Chithra
2.	"Odam Enge"	Vairamuthu	M. S. Viswanathan
3.	"Venanda"	Thirupathooran	Malaysia Vasudevan, S. N. Surendar, Deepan Chakravarthy
4.	"Poothamaligai"	Muthulingam	S. Janaki
5.	"Malligai Poovu"	Vairamuthu	Malaysia Vasudevan, S. Janaki
6.	"Azhagana"	Gangai Amaran	Malaysia Vasudevan, S. N. Surendar, Deepan Chakravarthy

== Reception ==
N. Krishnaswamy of The Indian Express criticised the film and called the screenplay "simply atrocious". Balumani of Anna praised the acting of star cast, Raghavan Thambi's screenplay, Senthil's humor, Gangai Amaran's music and Azhagappan's direction. The film became successful at the box-office, and Ramarajan won the Cinema Express Award for Best New Face Actor.
