= Solvathellam Unmai (film) =

1987 film by Netaji

- Poster
- Directed by: Netaji
- Produced by: Trichy A. Chandran; Gopi; T. Siva
- Starring: Vijayakanth; Rekha
- Cinematography: Ashok Kumar
- Edited by: T. Karunanithi
- Music by: Thayanban
- Production company: National Movie Makers
- Release date: 23 January 1987
- Country: India
- Language: Tamil

Solvathellam Unmai (transl. All that is said is the truth) is 1987 Indian Tamil-language thriller film directed by Netaji and co-produced by T. Siva, starring Vijayakanth and Rekha. It was released on 23 January 1987.

== Plot ==
A newspaper editor Jagan mastheads an inaccurate, unverified story about the death of a doctor named Sundaramoorthy. Unable to prevent the print order from reaching the stands, he murders Sundaramoorthy the same night. This brings him in league with a murderer and impersonator whose designs had tricked him into publishing the story in the first place. It is now left to Vijay, son of Sundaramoorthy, to avenge his father's death.

== Cast ==
- Vijayakanth as Vijay
- Rekha as Rekha
- Jaishankar as Jagan
- Radha Ravi as Fake Dr. Ramanathan
- Poornam Viswanathan as Dr. Sundaramoorthy
- Senthil as Geetha's husband
- Kovai Sarala as Geetha
- Delhi Ganesh as Raghavan
- Kallapetti Singaram as Munusamy
- Charle as Caregiver Psychiatrist
- Gundu Kalyanam as Gundu Kalyanam
- Anuradha as an item girl

== Production ==
The film was jointly produced by distributor A. Chandran along with T. Siva. Two songs were shot at Kodaikanal. The film was Siva's first as producer.

== Soundtrack ==
The soundtrack was composed by Thayanban.

Track listing
No.	Title	Singer(s)	Length
1.	"Oh Darling My Darling"	S. P. Balasubrahmanyam	5:41
2.	"Kannukulle Ennai Kanden"	S. P. Balasubrahmanyam, S. Janaki	4:25
3.	"Manjathil Naan Konjathaan Nee"	S. P. Balasubrahmanyam, S. Janaki	4:32
4.	"Pappa Podu Thappa"	Malaysia Vasudevan	4:11
Total length:			18:49

== Release and reception ==
Solvathellam Unmai was released on 23 January 1987. On 6 February 1987, N. Krishnaswamy of The Indian Express said, "Good photography by Ashok Kumar in patches and realistic performances by Jaishankar and Poornam Viswanathan are the strong points of this film. The major flaw is Netaji's narration that lacks both clarity and conviction. There is an intelligent core to the story, only the storytelling is messy." Jayamanmadhan of Kalki criticised the story, but praised the director for making it entertaining.
