= Poo Mazhai Pozhiyuthu =

- Title card
- Directed by: V. Azhagappan
- Written by: V. Azhagappan; Sri Kavi (dialogues)
- Produced by: N. Mohan; Tharangai V. Shanmugham
- Starring: Vijayakanth; Nadhiya; Suresh
- Cinematography: K. B. Dhayalan
- Edited by: P. Mohanraj; V. Rajagopal
- Music by: R. D. Burman (songs); Shyam (score)
- Production company: Sree Rajakali Amman Movies
- Release date: 19 February 1987
- Country: India
- Language: Tamil

Poo Mazhai Pozhiyuthu (transl. It is raining flowers) is a 1987 Indian Tamil language romantic drama film written and directed by V. Azhagappan. The film stars Vijayakanth and Nadhiya, with Suresh, Rajeev, S. S. Chandran and Senthil in supporting roles. It was released on 19 February 1987.

== Plot ==
Raja, settled in Singapore, visits his native village. His aunt tries to fortify family bonds, and seeks the hand of Raja's younger sister Asha for her son Pandian. Raja sniggers at the suggestion and is nasty while pointing out how out-of-place it is. Pandian vows to marry Asha but Raja vows to see that such a thing never happens.

In Singapore, responding to Pandian's overtures, Asha first tries to knock him dead with her Datsun, and then tries to drown him with her motorboat daredevilry, but ultimately undergoes a change of heart and is eating out of his hands. But misunderstandings again cloud the relationship, and when it is cleared Raja is again at his insidious tricks invidiously playing up another suitor Ramesh.

== Cast ==
- Vijayakanth as Pandian
- Nadhiya as Asha
- Suresh as Ramesh
- Rajeev as Raja
- S. S. Chandran as Chandran
- Senthil as Senthil
- Srikanth as Doctor (Guest appearance)

== Production ==
The film was primarily shot at Hong Kong, Singapore and Japan. It was a rare film where Vijayakanth did not play an action hero, the stereotype for which he was known during the period.

== Soundtrack ==
The soundtrack was composed by R. D. Burman and lyrics were written by Vaali. The background score was composed by Shyam. The song "Nadhiya Nadhiya Nile" became popular.

Track listing
No.	Title	Singer(s)	Length
1.	"Hey Poongodi"	S. P. Balasubrahmanyam
2.	"Nadhiya Nadhiya Nile"	S. P. Balasubrahmanyam, K. S. Chithra
3.	"Emama"	S. P. Balasubrahmanyam, K. S. Chithra
4.	"Ellarum Paithiyam"	K. S. Chithra
5.	"My Name is Aasha"	S. P. Balasubrahmanyam, K. S. Chithra

== Reception ==
N. Krishnaswamy of The Indian Express in his review dated 20 February 1987 called it "pretty run-of-the-mill stuff", however he praised the music, locations and cinematography. Jayamanmadhan of Kalki praised the acting of Rajeev and the climax for increasing tension and called the film one time watchable.
