= Ananda Aradhanai =

1987 film

- Title card
- Directed by: Dinesh Baboo
- Written by: M. S. Madhu (dialogues)
- Story by: Dinesh Baboo
- Produced by: D. S. Prasad
- Starring: Mohan; Suhasini; Lissy
- Cinematography: Dinesh Baboo
- Edited by: V. T. Vijayan; B. Lenin (supervision)
- Music by: Manoj–Gyan
- Production company: Jai Krishna Combines
- Release date: 27 March 1987
- Country: India
- Language: Tamil

Ananda Aradhanai (transl. Dedication of Happiness) is a 1987 Indian Tamil-language film written and directed by Dinesh Baboo in his directorial debut. The film stars Mohan, Suhasini and Lissy. It was released on 27 March 1987.

== Plot ==
A dance master falls in love with a young woman and their marriage is fixed. However, he gets an accident that leaves him paralysed, making his fiancée's mother call off their wedding. Meanwhile, his nurse Stella who takes care of him, develops a soft spot towards him.

== Cast ==
- Mohan as Mohan
- Suhasini as Stella
- Lissy as Kavitha
- Senthil
- Kovai Sarala
- Thyagu
- Charle
- Srividya

== Production ==
Ananda Aradhanai is the directorial debut of Dinesh Baboo, previously a cinematographer. The film was originally titled Aatmaraagam. Scenes involving Mohan and Suhasini were shot at Sathya Studios and Vijaya Gardens.

== Soundtrack ==
Soundtrack was composed by Manoj–Gyan.

Track listing
| No. | Title | Singer(s) | Length |
|---|---|---|---|
| 1. | "Padapporen" | S. P. Balasubrahmanyam, K. S. Chithra |
| 2. | "Naalai Namadhenna" | S. P. Balasubrahmanyam, K. S. Chithra |
| 3. | "Urave Thalladadhu" | S. Janaki |
| 4. | "Enna Solla" | S. P. Balasubrahmanyam |
| 5. | "Kaalam Iniya" | S. P. Balasubrahmanyam, K. S. Chithra |

== Reception ==
N. Krishnaswamy of The Indian Express appreciated the film for Dinesh Baboo's photography, saying that in terms of direction and writing, "has more or less done a good job of it". Krishnaswamy also praised Suhasini for portraying her role "with a great deal of understanding, restraint and class".
