= Nadhiya =

Indian actress

- Born: Zareena Moidu; 24 October 1966 (age 60); Pali Hill, Bombay, Maharashtra, India
- Other name: Nadhiya
- Occupation: Actress
- Years active: 1984–1990; 1994; 2004–present
- Spouse: Shirish Godbole (m. 1988)
- Children: 2
- Awards: Filmfare Awards South

Zareena Moidu, known by her stage name Nadhiya Moidu (in Malayalam) or simply Nadhiya (in Tamil and Telugu), is an Indian actress who predominantly appears in Tamil, Malayalam and Telugu films. She made her debut in the 1984 Malayalam film Nokketha Doorathu Kannum Nattu for which she won Filmfare Award for Best Actress – Malayalam.

She made her comeback in 2004 in Tamil films with M. Kumaran S/O Mahalakshmi, and received critical acclaim for her performance. In 2013, she received critical acclaim in Telugu cinema for both the roles she played, as Prabhas's mother in the film Mirchi and for playing a stubborn aunt in Attarintiki Daredi. For the latter, she received the Nandi Award for Best Supporting Actress for her performance.

== Early life ==
Nadiya was born to Malayali Muslim parents and spent her childhood in Sion, Mumbai. She had her primary education from The J.B Vachha High School for Parsi Girls, Mumbai, and her pre-university degree from Sir Jamsetjee Jeejebhoy School of Art. She couldn't continue her college studies after that as she became busy with movies by then. She earned her associate degree in Media Management and B.A. in Communication Arts - Radio & Television, while living in the United States.

== Personal life ==
Nadiya married Shirish Godbole in 1988. The couple has two daughters Sanam and Jana. After their wedding, she lived in the United States with her husband and daughters. In the year 2000, she moved to London, United Kingdom and lived there until 2007. She returned to India in 2008 and currently resides in Mumbai with her family.

== Career ==
Nadiya made her debut in the Malayalam film Nokketha Doorathu Kannum Nattu (1984), alongside Mohanlal and Padmini for which she won the Filmfare Award for Best Actress – Malayalam. This movie was remade in Tamil as Poove Poochudava in 1985 with Padmini and marked her debut in Tamil.

Nadiya claims she was considered for the role of Revathi in Mouna Ragam, a 1986 Tamil film, but declined due to prior commitments.

She then ventured into Tamil and Telugu cinema and became a popular actress in both industries during the 1980s and 1990s. She was a trendsetter even at those times working on her own terms and starred alongside all the big stars of the time such as Rajinikanth, Vijayakanth, Sathyaraj, Prabhu, Suresh and Mohan.

In the mid-1990s, she made a brief comeback as an actress, before moving to the United States.

After a successful career in the film industry, Nadhiya took a break from acting and focused on her personal life. However, she made a strong comeback to the big screen in the mid 2000s and continued to impress the audience with her acting prowess. Nadhiya made a successful comeback in the year 2004 with the movie M. Kumaran Son of Mahalakshmi.

Apart from films, Nadhiya has also appeared in some television serials and shows.

== Filmography ==
- Note: she is credited in Tamil and Telugu as Nadhiya and in Malayalam as Nadhiya Moidu.

=== Films ===
Year	Title	Role	Language	Notes
1984	Nokketha Doorathu Kannum Nattu	Girly Mathews	Malayalam	Filmfare Award for Best Actress – Malayalam
1985	Koodum Thedi	Judy	Malayalam	
1985	Vannu Kandu Keezhadakki	Manju	Malayalam	
1985	Onningu Vannengil	Meera	Malayalam	
1985	Kandu Kandarinju	Aswathy	Malayalam	
1985	Poove Poochudava	Sundari	Tamil	Nominated - Filmfare Award for Best Actress – Tamil
1986	Panchagni	Savithri	Malayalam	
1986	Atham Chithira Chothy	Radha	Malayalam	
1986	Shyama	Shyama	Malayalam	
1986	Poovinu Puthiya Poonthennal	Neetha	Malayalam	
1986	Pookkalai Parikkatheergal	Radha	Tamil	
1986	Manthira Punnagai	Geetha / Sheela	Tamil	
1986	Uyire Unakkaga	Uma alias princess Vijayanirmala Devi	Tamil	
1986	Unakkaagave Vaazhgiren	Chithra	Tamil	
1986	Nilave Malare	Janaki / Sheela	Tamil	Nominated - Filmfare Award for Best Actress – Tamil
1987	Poo Mazhai Pozhiyuthu	Asha	Tamil	
1987	Chinna Thambi Periya Thambi	Kavitha	Tamil	
1987	Pavazha Malligai		Tamil	
1987	Paadu Nilave	Sangeetha	Tamil	
1987	Mangai Oru Gangai	Nancy	Tamil	
1987	Iniya Uravu Poothathu	Sumathi	Tamil	
1987	Rekha		Tamil	
1987	Anbulla Appa	Radha	Tamil	Nominated - Filmfare Award for Best Actress – Tamil
1987	Poove Ilam Poove	Radha	Tamil	
1988	Irandil Ondru	Valli	Tamil	
1988	Bazaar Rowdy	Sireesha / Sarika	Telugu	
1989	Vinta Dongalu	Anagha	Telugu	
1989	Rajathi Raja	Lakshmi	Tamil	
1990	En Veedu En Kanavar	Radha	Tamil	
1994	Rajakumaran	Vaidehi	Tamil	
1994	O Thandri O Koduku	Priya	Telugu	
1994	Chinna Madam	Tamilarasi	Tamil	
1994	Vadhu Doctoranu	Ammukutty	Malayalam	
2004	M. Kumaran S/O Mahalakshmi	Mahalakshmi	Tamil	Nominated - Filmfare Award for Best Supporting Actress – Tamil
2007	Thaamirabharani	Sakunthala Devi	Tamil	
2008	Sandai	Thangalakshmi	Tamil	
2009	Pattalam	Daisy	Tamil	
2011	Doubles	Gauri	Malayalam	
2011	Sevenes	Amala	Malayalam	
2013	Mirchi	Latha	Telugu	Extended Cameo Appearance
2013	Aaru Sundarimaarude Katha	Rose Moothedan	Malayalam	
2013	English: An Autumn in London	Sarasu	Malayalam	
2013	Attarintiki Daredi	Sunanda	Telugu	Nandi Award for Best Supporting Actress; TSR - TV9 National Film Award for Best Supporting Actress; Nominated - Filmfare Award for Best Supporting Actress – Telugu; Nominated - SIIMA Award for Best Supporting Actress – Telugu
2014	Drushyam	IGP Geetha Prabhakar IPS	Telugu	Nominated -Filmfare Award for Best Supporting Actress – Telugu; Nominated - SIIMA Award for Best Supporting Actress – Telugu
2015	Bruce Lee: The Fighter	Vasundhara	Telugu	
2016	A...Aa	Mahalakshmi	Telugu	Nominated - SIIMA Award for Best Supporting Actress – Telugu
2016	Girls / Thiraikku Varadha Kathai	Deepika IPS	Malayalam; Tamil	Bilingual film
2018	Naa Peru Surya	Satya	Telugu	
2018	Neerali	Mollykutty	Malayalam	
2020	Miss India	Kamala	Telugu	Netflix film
2021	Varudu Kaavalenu	Prabhavati	Telugu	
2021	Drushyam 2	Geetha Prabhakar	Telugu	Amazon Prime Video release
2022	Putham Pudhu Kaalai Vidiyaadhaa	Yashoda	Tamil	Segment: "Mouname Paarvayaai"
2022	Bheeshma Parvam	Fathima	Malayalam	
2022	Ghani	Madhuri	Telugu	
2022	Sarkaru Vaari Paata	Rajakumari	Telugu	Cameo appearance
2022	Ante Sundaraniki	Jyothi	Telugu	
2022	The Warriorr	Satya's mother	Telugu; Tamil	Bilingual film (Note: Her scenes were shot in Tamil only.)
2022	Wonder Women	Nandita	English	
2023	Let's Get Married	Leela	Tamil	
2026	Bachelor Party D'eux	Anna Mathews	Malayalam	

=== Short films ===
Year	Title	Role	Language	Notes
2021	Oru Paathiraa Swapnam Pole	Sudha	Malayalam	

=== Television ===
Year	Title	Role	Language	Network	Notes
2010	Jackpot	Host	Tamil	Jaya TV	
2015	Veruthe Alla Bharya	Judge	Malayalam	Mazhavil Manorama	
2016	Badai Bungalow	Guest	Malayalam	Asianet	
2019	Comedy Stars Season 2	Judge	Malayalam	Asianet	
2019	Roja	Herself	Tamil	Sun TV	Cameo appearance (Episodes 278 - 286)
2024	Musical Wife	Judge	Malayalam	Flowers TV	
2024	Manorathangal	Balu's sister	Malayalam	ZEE5	Anthology series Segment: Sherlock
