= En Vazhi Thani Vazhi (1988 film) =

- Title card
- Directed by: V. Azhagappan
- Starring: Raghuvaran; Geetha; Nishanthi; S. S. Chandran
- Music by: Chandrabose
- Production company: Rekha Movies
- Release date: 15 December 1988
- Running time: 130 minutes
- Country: India
- Language: Tamil

En Vazhi Thani Vazhi (transl. My path is a unique path) is a 1988 Indian Tamil-language action film directed by V. Azhagappan, starring Raghuvaran, supported by Geetha, Nishanthi and S. S. Chandran. The film became more known after actor Rajinikanth used the punch line En Vazhi Thani Vazhi in his 1999 film Padayappa. It was released on 15 December 1988.

== Plot ==
Raja is an advocate who takes on a corrupt system.

== Cast ==
- Raghuvaran as Advocate Raja
- Geetha
- Nishanthi
- S. S. Chandran
- Senthil

== Soundtrack ==
The soundtrack was composed by Chandrabose.

Track listing
No.	Title	Singer(s)	Length
1.	"Enga Koottam"	Malaysia Vasudevan
2.	"Kadhal Paravai"	K. S. Chithra
3.	"Pillai Pookkal"	K. S. Chithra
4.	"Mama Azhagu"	S. P. Sailaja
5.	"Ezhunthal"	Vanitha
6.	"Dhaayam Podu"	S. P. Sailaja

== Release ==
The film failed at the box-office and Azhagappan suffered losses as producer.
