= V. Azhagappan =

Indian film director and scriptwriter

- Occupation(s): Director, actor

Vendhampatti Azhagappan was an Indian film director and screenwriter who has worked on Tamil films. He rose to fame after making the romantic drama film Aagaya Thamaraigal (1985) featuring Suresh and Revathi and continued to make films in the same genre.

== Career ==
Azhagappan who earlier assisted Devaraj-Mohan made his directorial debut with Ramayi Vayasukku Vandhutta. He then made a film called Kannile Anbirundhal starring Vijayan; however the film failed to release due to Vijayan's declining market. After this Azhagappan struggled for opportunities and after a gap he got an opportunity to make Aagaya Thamaraigal which did well at box-office. His next film Pookalai Parikatheergal also did well. His next film was Poo Mazhai Pozhiyuthu with Vijayakanth which was shot in Japan.

During his career Azhagappan regularly collaborated with actor Ramarajan, as well as Suresh. His final release, Poomaname Vaa (1999) was produced under the banner of Nalini Cine Arts by Ramarajan's wife Nalini Ramarajan. During production, the film was labelled as the actor's 40th film and 11th film as a director, but V. Azhagappan was later given the post. The initial cast included other actors such as Chandrasekhar, Manorama and Santhana Bharathi, who eventually did not feature. It became Azhagappan's final film as director and he passed way later.

== Filmography ==
Director

Year	Film	Cast	Notes
1980	Ramaye Vayasukku Vanthutta	Uday Shankar, Menaka	
1985	Aagaya Thamaraigal	Suresh, Revathi	
1986	Pookkalai Parikkatheergal	Suresh, Nadhiya	
1986	Namma Ooru Nalla Ooru	Ramarajan, Rekha	
1987	Poo Mazhai Pozhiyuthu	Vijayakanth, Nadhiya, Suresh	
1987	Poo Poova Poothirukku	Prabhu, Saritha, Amala	
1988	Kunguma Kodu	Mohan, Nalini, Suresh, Ramya Krishnan	
1988	Irandil Ondru	Ramki, Nadhiya, Raghuvaran	
1988	En Vazhi Thani Vazhi	Raghuvaran, Geetha, Shantipriya	
1989	Thangamana Raasa	Ramarajan, Kanaka	
1991	Thanga Thamaraigal	Arjun, Rupini	
1999	Poomaname Vaa	Ramarajan, Sangita	
