= Iniya Uravu Poothathu =

- Theatrical release poster
- Directed by: C. V. Sridhar
- Produced by: Tharangai V. Shanmugham; Mohan Natarajan
- Starring: Suresh; Nadhiya
- Cinematography: B. R. Vijayalakshmi
- Music by: Ilaiyaraaja
- Production company: Sri Rajakaliamman Productions
- Release date: 21 October 1987
- Country: India
- Language: Tamil

Iniya Uravu Poothathu (transl. A sweet relationship has blossomed) is a 1987 Indian Tamil-language romantic comedy film directed by C. V. Sridhar. The film stars Suresh and Nadhiya. It was released on 21 October 1987.

== Cast ==
- Suresh
- Nadhiya
- S. Ve. Shekher
- Cho

== Soundtrack ==
The soundtrack was composed by Ilaiyaraaja, and lyrics were written by Vaali.

Song	Singers
"Chikkendra Aadaiyil"	Usha Uthup, S. Janaki
"Enge Enge"	S. Janaki
"Or Poomalai"	Mano, K. S. Chithra
"Thottale Podhum"	Mano
"Kaiyale Type Adikkathane"	S. P. Balasubrahmanyam
"Chittu Pole"	K. S. Chithra

== Release and reception ==
Iniya Uravu Poothathu was released on 21 October 1987, Diwali day. The Indian Express wrote, "There are points where the story lacks credibility and the film begins to drag but with lively comedy by S. V. Sekhar [...] and good work by Cho [...] the going is somewhat smooth." Jayamanmadhan of Kalki praised Ilaiyaraaja's music, the cinematography, Suresh-Nadhiya's pairing and appreciated Sridhar for narrating an old story in an interesting manner. Balumani of Anna felt the film was humorous in first half, goes slightly dull in second half but praised the climax. He appreciated Sridhar for keeping the film humorous and also praised him for portraying the female protagonist as bold women.
