= Suresh (actor, born 1963) =

Indian Telugu actor (born 1963)

- Born: Mysore Seshaiah Suresh Babu Naidu; 26 August 1963 (age 63); Srikalahasti, Andhra Pradesh, India
- Occupations: Actor, producer, director, dubbing artist
- Years active: 1981–present
- Political party: Bharatiya Janata Party
- Spouse: Anita (m.1990; div.1995)
- Children: 1

Mysore Seshaiah Suresh Babu Naidu is an Indian actor, producer, director, and dubbing artist who works predominantly in Telugu and Tamil languages.

== Personal life ==
Suresh was born in Sri Kalhasthi. His parents were also born in Sri Kalahasthi. His grandfather was from Nellore.

Suresh was previously married to actress and singer Anitha Reddy, who played the female lead in films such as Babai Abbai (1985) and Srivari Sobhanam (1985).

== Career ==
Suresh started his career as an editing assistant and a dance assistant. One of his father's friends thought that he could become a successful lead actor. Suresh approached director C. V. Sridhar with a portfolio but was turned down. A few years later, Suresh played the lead in three of Sridhar's films. He then met director duo Santhana Bharathi and P. Vasu, who cast him as the lead in Panneer Pushpangal (1981). Suresh was simultaneously offered the lead role in Bharathiraja's Alaigal Oivathillai (1981), which he turned down for the former film. Both films were large commercial successes. He became the prominent face of the Tamil Film Industry, through the 1980s. Suresh played the role of a lover in many films and produced four films and seven television serials before taking a hiatus in the 1990s. During the period he enhanced his career in Telugu cinema.

Suresh made a comeback to Tamil cinema in 2006 with Kizhakku Kadarkarai Salai starring Srikanth. He played supporting roles including in Aasal (2010) alongside Ajith Kumar. In 2012, Suresh appeared in the Tamil-Telugu bilingual film Kadhalil Sodhappuvadhu Yeppadi directed by Balaji Mohan, playing the character of Akilan Venkatesan, who was going through a mid-life crisis. A reviewer for The Hindu called the entire cast "effective".

Suresh has hosted and judged six seasons of the competitive cooking game show Kitchen Superstar for Vijay TV.

As a dubbing / voice-over artist, Suresh was the Tamil voice of the actor Ajith Kumar in Aasai (1995) and for Nagarjuna in Idhayathai Thirudathe (1989), Siva (1989), Ratchagan (1997) and Manam (2016).

From 2018 to 2020, he has starred opposite Khushbu Sundar in the bilingual daily serial Lakshmi Stores.

== Filmography ==
=== Actor ===
Year	Title	Role	Language	Notes
1981	Panneer Pushpangal	Aravind Prabhu	Tamil	
1981	Ramadandu	Ashok	Telugu	
1981	Jagamondi		Telugu	
1982	Thunai	Suresh	Tamil	
1982	Ilanjodigal	Buddy Raju	Tamil	
1982	Mathulai Muthukkal		Tamil	
1982	Nirantharam		Tamil	
1982	Manjal Nila	Anand	Tamil	
1982	Kozhi Koovuthu	Ramakrishnan	Tamil	
1982	Boom Boom Maadu	Velu	Tamil	
1982	Pelleedu Pillalu	Ramesh	Telugu	
1982	Ethanai Konam Ethanai Parvai		Tamil	Unreleased
1982	Magane Magane		Tamil	
1983	Police Venkataswamy	Ravi	Telugu	
1983	Valartha Kada	Raja	Tamil	
1983	Apoorva Sahodarigal	Suresh	Tamil	
1983	Alai Payum Nenjangal		Tamil	
1983	Vellai Roja	Johnny	Tamil	
1983	Brahmmacharigal		Tamil	
1983	Idhu Enga Naadu		Tamil	
1983	Thalaimagan	Shekhar	Tamil	
1983	Puthisaali Paithiyangal	Ramu	Tamil	
1983	Seerum Singangal	Chinnasamy	Tamil	
1984	Manmadha Rajakkal	Raja	Tamil	
1984	Ullam Uruguthadi		Tamil	
1984	Naan Paadum Paadal	Bus controller	Tamil	Special appearance
1984	Thiruttu Rajakkal		Tamil	
1984	Ithiri Poove Chuvannapoove	Ravi	Malayalam	
1984	Yuddham		Tamil	
1984	S. P. Bhayankar		Telugu	
1984	Etho Mogam		Tamil	
1984	Neethikku Oru Penn		Tamil	
1984	Aalaya Deepam	Suresh	Tamil	
1984	Vellai Pura Ondru	Suresh	Tamil	
1984	Shankari	Peter	Tamil	
1984	Jada Gantalu	Ram Babu	Telugu	
1984	Then Koodu	Suresh	Tamil	
1984	Unnai Naan Santhithen	Murali	Tamil	
1985	Rajathi Rojakili	Rani's Husband	Tamil	
1985	Hello Yaar Pesurathu		Tamil	
1985	Kolusu	Ramachandran	Tamil	
1985	Aagaya Thamaraigal	Sekhar	Tamil	
1985	Alaya Deepam	Rajesh	Telugu	
1985	Navagraha Nayagi	Girisha	Tamil	
1985	Perumai		Tamil	
1985	Unnidam Mayangukiren		Tamil	
1985	Urimai	Suresh	Tamil	
1985	Veettukkari	Mohan	Tamil	
1985	Engal Kural	Thyagu	Tamil	
1985	Aasha	Mohan	Tamil	
1985	Irandu Manam	Anand	Tamil	
1985	Selvi	Raja	Tamil	
1985	Terror	Suresh	Telugu	
1985	Unakkaga Oru Roja	Kannan	Tamil	
1986	Marumagal	Raja	Tamil	
1986	Revathi		Tamil	
1986	Maragatha Veenai	Kannan	Tamil	
1986	Oru Manithan Oru Manaivi	Vathiyar	Tamil	
1986	Poramai		Tamil	
1986	Africavil Appu		Tamil	
1986	Pookkalai Parikkatheergal	Raja	Tamil	
1986	Unnai Thedi Varuven	Anand	Tamil	
1986	Engal Thaaikulame Varuga	Ashok	Tamil	
1986	Jothi Malar		Tamil	
1986	Unakkaagave Vaazhgiren	Vijay	Tamil	
1986	Paanjali	Raja	Tamil	
1986	Sivappu Nila	Kannan	Tamil	
1986	Sonnathu Neethana	Inspector S. Balu	Tamil	
1986	Sigappu Malargal	Vijay	Tamil	
1986	Mounam Kalaikirathu	Kannan	Tamil	
1986	Manthira Punnagai	Mohan	Tamil	
1987	Iniya Uravu Poothathu	Sundar	Tamil	
1987	Poo Mazhai Pozhiyuthu	Ramesh	Tamil	
1987	Mangai Oru Gangai	Vijay	Tamil	
1987	Poove Ilam Poove	Murali	Tamil	
1987	Manaiviyai Kadhali		Tamil	
1987	Pagabattina Panchali		Telugu	
1987	Chellakutti		Tamil	
1987	Kizhakku Africavil Sheela	Shankar	Tamil	
1988	Kunguma Kodu	Raja	Tamil	
1988	Prana Snehitulu	Ramesh	Telugu	
1988	Intinti Bhagavatham	Suresh	Telugu	
1989	Chinna Mayil		Tamil	
1989	Aakhari Kshanam	Guru	Telugu	
1989	Swathi Chinukulu	Shankar	Telugu	
1989	Rajanadai	Pandian	Tamil	
1989	Laila		Telugu	
1990	Intinta Deepavali	Shekhar	Telugu	
1990	Pudhu Vasantham	Suresh	Tamil	
1990	En Veedu En Kanavar	Raja	Tamil	
1990	Puttinti Pattu Cheera	Prasad	Telugu	Dubbed in Tamil as Porandha Veettu Pattu Pudavai
1990	Yuvabharatham		Telugu	
1990	Mamasri		Telugu	
1990	Neti Charitra	Vinay	Telugu	
1990	Ankitham	Murali	Telugu	
1991	Intlo Pilli Veedhilo Puli	Shiva Ram	Telugu	
1991	Prarthana	Johnny	Telugu	
1991	Palleturi Pellam '		Telugu	
1991	Chinna Kodalu	Babu	Telugu	
1991	Mugguru Attala Muddula Alludu		Telugu	
1991	Madhura Nagarilo	Anand	Telugu	
1991	Jeevana Chadarangam	Srikanth	Telugu	
1992	Prema Vijeta	Babu	Telugu	
1992	Asadhyulu	Anand	Telugu	
1992	Naga Kanya		Telugu	
1992	Surigadu	Jeevi	Telugu	
1992	Allari Pilla	Raju	Telugu	
1992	Jagannatham & Sons	Vijay	Telugu	
1992	Shreeman Brahmachari	Suresh	Telugu	
1992	Samsarala Mechanic	Babugaru	Telugu	
1993	Rajeswari Kalyanam	Shankar	Telugu	
1993	Paruvu Prathista	Kiran	Telugu	
1993	Vaasthavam	Ashok	Telugu	
1993	Pelli Gola		Telugu	
1993	Ladies Special	Baskar Rao	Telugu	
1993	Rowdy Gaari Teacher	Ranga	Telugu	
1994	Veetla Visheshanga	Ganesh	Tamil	
1994	Palnati Pourusham	Suri Babu	Telugu	
1994	Maro Quit India	Babu	Telugu	
1994	Todi Kodallu	Babu	Telugu	
1994	Namaste Anna	Raja	Telugu	
1995	Akka Chellellu	Gopi	Telugu	
1995	Ammoru	Surya	Telugu	Dubbed in Tamil as Amman
1995	Guntur Gundamma Katha	Babu	Telugu	
1995	Patha Basti	Babu	Telugu	
1995	Witness	Suresh	Tamil	
1996	Pellaala Rajyam	Bujji	Telugu	
1996	Nayanamma	Balu	Telugu	
1997	Thaali Pudhusu	Balu	Tamil	
1997	Saradaala Samsaram	Suresh	Telugu	
1997	Dongaata	Prakash Rao	Telugu	
1997	Pattukondi Chooddam	Chanti / Chittu / Chujuki	Telugu	
1998	Prema Pallaki	Suresh	Telugu	
1998	Kalavari Chellelu Kanaka Mahalakshmi	Chandru	Telugu	
1998	Subbaraju Gari Kutumbam	Suresh	Telugu	
1998	O Panaipothundi Babu	Ram & Ram	Telugu	dual roles
1999	Velugu Needalu		Telugu	
1999	Iddaru Mitrulu	Prakash	Telugu	
1999	Ullathai Killathe	Raja	Tamil	
1999	Telangana		Telugu	
1999	Hello...Yama!	Suri	Telugu	
2000	Devi Putrudu	Har Gopal	Telugu	
2000	Top Lechipoddi		Telugu	
2000	Okkadu Chalu	Suresh	Telugu	
2000	Ee Taram Nehru	Collector Suresh	Telugu	
2000	Bhavani	Bhavani	Telugu	Also director
2000	Ammo! Okato Tareekhu	Kiran	Telugu	
2001	Prematho Raa	Vijay	Telugu	
2002	Raghava	Raghava Reddy	Telugu	Also producer
2002	Vachina Vaadu Suryudu	Satyam	Telugu	Uncredited guest appearance
2003	Simhachalam	Suresh	Telugu	
2004	Abhi		Telugu	
2006	Desiya Paravai	David	Tamil	
2006	Kizhakku Kadarkarai Salai	Vetri	Tamil	
2006	Gopi – Goda Meeda Pilli	Lord Vishnu	Telugu	
2009	Flash News	MLA Thirumala Das	Telugu	
2010	Aasal	Daniel Dharmaraj	Tamil	
2010	Vallakottai	Easwara Pandian	Tamil	
2011	Aadu Puli	Thillainayagam	Tamil	
2011	Doubles	Mishal	Malayalam	
2011	Sattapadi Kutram	Annamalai	Tamil	
2012	Rushi	Professor Lakshmipati	Telugu	
2012	Kadhalil Sodhappuvadhu Yeppadi	Akilan Venkatesan	Tamil	
2012	Love Failure	Aravind Venkatesan	Telugu	
2012	Friends Book		Telugu	
2012	Srimannarayana	Harshad	Telugu	
2012	Sattam Oru Iruttarai		Tamil	
2013	Puthagam	Imaiyappan	Tamil	
2013	Jabardasth	Vamshi Krishna	Telugu	
2013	Naalu Perum Romba Nallavanga		Tamil	
2013	Satya 2	Subramanyam	Telugu	
2013	Om 3D	Lakshman	Telugu	
2013	Thalaivaa	Meera's Father	Tamil	
2013	Break Up		Telugu	
2013	Apple Penne	Church father	Tamil	
2013	Anukunnadi Okati Ayyindi Okati		Telugu	
2014	Saivam	Maiyappan	Tamil	
2014	Adavi Kaachina Vennela		Telugu	
2015	Tommy	Chandrasekhar	Telugu	
2015	Sagaptham	Doctor	Tamil	
2015	Lion	CBI Chief Kesava Prasad	Telugu	
2016	Azhagu Kutti Chellam	Church father	Tamil	
2016	Janatha Garage	Suresh	Telugu	
2017	Luckunnodu	Police Commissioner	Telugu	
2017	Aval	Doctor Prasad	Tamil	Bilingual film
2017	The House Next Door	Doctor Prasad	Hindi	Bilingual film
2017	Winner	Rajeev Reddy	Telugu	
2017	LIE	Sathyam's father	Telugu	
2018	Mohini	Monk	Tamil	
2018	Hello Guru Prema Kosame	Reethu's father	Telugu	
2018	Subrahmanyapuram	Varma	Telugu	
2018	Party	Chidhambaram	Tamil	Unreleased
2019	Ispade Rajavum Idhaya Raniyum	Reethu's father	Tamil	
2022	Ginna	Narayana Swami	Telugu	
2023	Spy	Army Chief VK Nair	Telugu	
2023	Priyamudan Priya		Tamil	
2024	Rewind		Telugu	
2026	Cheekatilo	Rajamani	Telugu	
2026	Kadhal Kadhai Sollava	Businessman	Tamil	

=== Voice actor ===
Actor	Film	Language
Nagarjuna	Udhayam	Tamil (dubbed)
Nagarjuna	Ratchagan	Tamil
Nagarjuna	Manam	Tamil (dubbed)
Ajith Kumar	Aasai	Tamil
Ajay Kapoor	Ooty	Tamil
Naseer Abdullah	Mitr, My Friend	Telugu (Dubbed)
Arvind Swamy	Nawaab	Telugu (Dubbed)

=== As director and producer ===
- 2000 Bhavani (Telugu) (as director)
- 2002 Raghava (Telugu) (as producer)

=== Television ===
Year	Title	Role	Language	Channel
1999	Ganesh & Vasanth	Ganesh	Tamil	Sun TV
2000	Manase Mandiram		Telugu	Gemini TV
2002–2003	Priyamaina Satruvu		Telugu	ETV
2003	Kungumam		Tamil	Sun TV
2014–2015	Kitchen Super Star	Judge	Tamil	Vijay TV
2017–2018	Nathicharami	Suresh	Telugu	Gemini TV
2018–2020	Lakshmi Stores	Devaraj	Tamil	Sun TV
2019	Lakshmi Stores	Diwakar	Telugu	Gemini TV
2021	Alitho Saradaga	Guest	Telugu	ETV
2022	Meera	Krishna	Tamil	Colors Tamil
2023	Cook With Comali	Guest Judge	Tamil	Star Vijay
