= Rajeev (Tamil actor) =

Indian actor (born 1956)

Raajiv
- Born: Rajasekhar Balasubramaniam; 1962 (age 63–64); Madurai, Tamil Nadu, India
- Other name: Rajeev
- Occupation: Actor
- Years active: 1981–2011
- Spouse: Rani
- Children: 2

Rajeev is an Indian actor, predominantly working in the Tamil film industry. He has also appeared in Malayalam films with the hit films Ustaad (1999), F.I.R (1999), Sathyam (2004) and Collector (2011). He is mainly noted for his villain role as Narendra Shetty in the 1999 crime thriller film F. I. R.. He has also appeared in Kannada and Telugu films.

== Personal life ==
Rajeev was born as Rajasekhar in Madurai. His father, Balasubramaniya Mudaliar was working in Indian Telephone Industries, Bengaluru-560016, his mother was Rajeswari Ammal. He studied in ITI Vidya Mandir in Bengaluru-560016. After the death of his parents, Rajeev refused to marry anyone, but agreed after the insistence of his brothers. He is married to Rani and has a daughter, Meena Kamakshi and a son, Kiran Surya.

== Career ==
Rajeev applied for auditions to act in films. He faced lot of struggle and rejection during auditions. Due to lack of opportunities, he worked as a waiter at Taj Coromandel Hotel. He got first prize for dancing in a competition at the hotel; his friends insisted to him to try his luck again in films.

Rajeev met his classmate, Telugu actor Rajendra Prasad at a dubbing studio. Malayalam actor Raveendran, who saw Rajeev, asked him to dub his voice in Oru Thalai Ragam. Rajeev gladly accepted the offer, T. Rajender, director of that film, selected Rajeev as a dubbing artist. He again dubbed for Raveendran in Vasantha Azhaippugal. T. Rajender provided him an opportunity to play a sadistic husband in Rail Payanangalil. He then acted as one of the four heroes in Paalaivanacholai.

In Kannada, he has starred opposite top heroines like Lakshmi and Arathi and also played the role of Suhasini's wayward brother in K. Balachander's Benkiyalli Aralida Hoovu (remake of Aval Oru Thodar Kathai).

== Filmography ==
His films include:

=== Actor ===
==== Tamil ====
- Rail Payanangalil (1981)
- Palaivana Solai (1981)
- Anjatha Nenjangal (1981)

Ragam thedum Pallavi (1982)

- Vetri Namathe (1982)
- Nenjil Oru Ragam (1982)
- Nizhal Thedum Nenjangal (1982)
- Kadavulukku Oru Kaditham (1982)
- Nadodi Raja (1982)
- Nirantharam (1982)
- Vedikkai Manithargal (1982)
- Thunai (1982)
- Samayapurathale Satchi (1983)
- Urangatha Ninaivugal (1983)
- Muthu Engal Sothu (1983)
- Ilaya Piravigal (1983)
- Yuga Dharmam (1983)
- Oru Indhiya Kanavu (1983)
- Nerupukkul Eeram (1984)
- Priyamudan Prabhu (1984)
- Unakkaga Oru Roja (1985)
- Nermai (1985)
- Kaaki Sattai (1985)
- Kadivalam (1985)
- Selvi (1985)
- Naan Ungal Rasigan (1985)
- Paartha Gnabagam Illayo (1985)
- Thendral Thodatha Malar (1985)
- Chain Jayapal (1985)
- Sugamana Raagangal (1985)
- Naanum Oru Thozhilali (1986)
- Pookalai Parikkatheergal (1986)
- Nee Thana Andha Kuyil (1986)
- Nambinar Keduvathillai (1986)
- Badhil Solval Badrakali (1986)
- Enakku Nane Needipathi (1986)
- Annai En Deivam (1986)
- Thazhuvatha Kaigal (1986)
- Aayiram Kannudayaal (1986)
- Neethana Antha Kuyil (1986)
- Pirandhen Valarndhen (1986)
- Ellai Kodu (1987)
- Poo Mazhai Pozhiyuthu (1987)
- Enga Ooru Pattukaran (1987)
- Arul Tharum Ayyappan (1987)
- Gramathu Kiligal (1987)
- Poo Poova Poothirukku (1987)
- Kai Koduppal Karpagammbal (1988)
- Irandil Ondru (1988)
- Yettikki Potti (1988)
- Adhu Andakkalam (1988)
- Thangamana Raasa (1989)
- Naanum Indha Ooruthan (1990)
- Vazhndhu Kattuvom (1990)
- Erikkarai Poonkatrey (1990)
- En Veedu En Kanavar (1990)
- Oorellam Un Pattu (1991)
- Ponnukketha Purushan (1992)
- Enga Veetu Velan (1992)
- Siragadikka Aasai (1994)
- Sakthivel (1994)
- Sadhu (1994)
- Ilaignar Ani (1994)
- Raja Pandi (1994)
- Chinna Muthu (1994)
- Thai Thangai Pasam (1995)
- Anbu Magan (1995)
- Mettukudi (1996)
- Kadhal Kottai (1996) as Sekhar
- Vivasaayi Magan (1997)
- Kaalamellam Kadhal Vaazhga (1997)
- Maradha Uravu (1997)
- Kondattam (1998)
- Rathna (1998)
- Kaadhal Kavithai (1998)
- Kanave Kalaiyadhe (1999)
- Vaalee (1999)
- Manam Virumbuthe Unnai (1999)
- Mugavaree (2000)
- Vaanathaippola (2000)
- Kakkai Siraginilae (2000)
- Vetri Kodi Kattu (2000)
- Friends (2001)
- Citizen (2001)
- Love Channel (2001)
- Vaanchinathan (2001)
- Azhagana Naatkal (2001)
- Manadhai Thirudivittai (2001)
- Kasi (2001)
- Red (2002)
- En Mana Vaanil (2002)
- Padum Vanampadi (2002)
- Namma Veetu Kalyanam (2002)
- Nilavil Kalangamillai (2003)
- Nee Varum Padhaiyellam (2003)
- Jayam (2003)
- Engal Anna (2004)
- Gajendra (2004)
- Devathayai Kanden (2005)
- Thaka Thimi Tha (2005)
- Karka Kasadara (2005)
- Kaatrullavarai (2005)
- Thirudi (2006)
- Amirtham (2006)
- Thullal (2007)
- Thodakkam (2008)
- Theekuchi (2008)
- Ashoka (2008)
- Sivappu Mazhai (2010)

==== Kannada ====
- Benkiyalli Aralida Hoovu (1983)
- Samarpane (1983)
- Aparanji (1984)
- Lakshmi Kataksha (1985)
- Vajramushti (1985)
- Sedina Hakki (1985)
- Nannavaru (1986)
- Yuddha Kanda (1989)
- Kollur Kala (1991)
- Gandugali (1994)
- Janumada Jodi (1996)
- Nammoora Huduga (1998)
- Shabdavedhi (2000)
- Ticket Tickets (2000)
- Nagarahavu (2002)
- Snehana Preethina (2007)

==== Malayalam ====
- Collector (2011) John Christopher
- Udayam (2004) CI Akbar Salim
- Sathyam (2004) Minister Madhava Menon
- F.I.R (1999) as Narendra Shetty
- Usthaad (1999) as Yusuf
- Elavamkodu Desam (1998) Udukoman

==== Telugu ====
- Kokilamma (1983)
- Neti Bharatam (1983)
- Goonda (1984) as Kasiram
- Agni Gundam (1984)
- Intiko Rudramma (1985) as Ravindra
- Kaliyuga Pandavulu (1986)
- Chitram! Bhalare Vichitram!! (1992)
- Bangaru Kutumbam (1994)

=== Dubbing artist ===
- Arun Pandian for Raja Muthirai (1995) and Asuran (1995)
- Mohanlal for Siraichalai (1996) and Aran (2006)
- Sayaji Shinde for the films Bharathi (2000) and Poovellam Un Vasam (2001)
- Raveendran for Oru Thalai Ragam (1980) and Vasantha Azhaippugal (1980)
- Bhanuchander for Devi (1999)

=== Television ===
- Meendum Gauravam
