= Senthil =

Indian actor and comedian

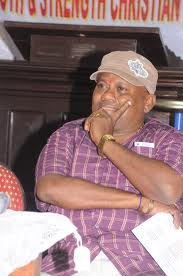
- Senthil at a function in 2014
- Born: 23 March 1951 (age 75); Kadaladi, Tamil Nadu, India
- Occupations: Comedian, actor
- Years active: 1979–2010; 2015–present
- Works: Full list
- Spouse: Kalaiselvi (m. 1984)
- Children: 2

Senthil (born 23 March 1951) is an Indian comedy actor who works in Tamil cinema. He is famous for his comedian roles along with fellow actor Goundamani. The pair dominated the Tamil industry as comedians in the 1980s and 90s. They were described as "Tamil cinema's Laurel and Hardy."

== Personal life ==
Senthil was born on 23 March 1951 in a small village Ilanjambor in Paramakudi, Tamil Nadu. He married Kalaiselvi on 14 May 1984.

== Career ==
=== As actor ===
He ran away from his village at the age of 13 due to his father's scoldings. He first worked in an oil mart, then in a private wine shop as a waiter and then ended up in drama where he started developing his skills.

He made his debut with Oru Koyil Iru Dheepangal (1979) though officially his first film was Ithikkara Pakki, which was released in 1980. In an interview, Senthil said that he has acted in several films when he was younger in uncredited roles. He slowly entered the Tamil film industry in small characters and finally landed a good role in the film Malaiyoor Mambattiyan. He has acted in many popular films with several of the leading actors and comedians in the south Indian cine industry. He usually appears in films with Goundamani in a slapstick double act. They formed a comic pair in many Tamil films.

In 2019, Senthil has started acting in Tamil tele-serials making his debut with Sun TV's Rasaathi.

=== Politics ===
Initially campaigning for AIADMK, Senthil is currently campaigning for AMMK party. Former minister Gokula Indira was replaced in the post of organising secretary by Senthil, appointed by T. T. V. Dhinakaran in AIADMK in 2017. Later, he joined TTV Dinakaran's Amma Makkal Munnetra Kazhagam political party. In September 2019, Senthil, Kathirkamu, Raja Manickam, Devadas and Henry Thomas were announced as the five organisation secretaries of AMMK party. He joined Bharatiya Janata Party, just before the 2021 Tamil Nadu Assembly elections.
