= Bhoopeshwari =

- Arohana: Sa Re Ga Pa dha Sa‘
- Avarohana: Sa‘dha Pa Ga Re Sa
- Synonym: Bhoopkali
- Similar: Bhoopali

Raga Bhoopeshwari is a Hindustani classical raga.

== Origin ==
The Bhoopeshwari raga is not a traditional raga.

It is generally accepted that it was created between the 1990s and 2000s. It may have been created by Ustad Alladiya Khan of the Jaipur-Atrauli Gharana, although it emerged only after his death. It is also credited to Pt. Mani Prasad of the Kirana Gharana.

An audav raga allows significant ambiguity. Since the remaining notes/swaras are unknown, it is quite difficult to determine its parent raga or scale. This raga does not fit into any of Bhatkhande's thaats. It may be linked to the Melakarta Chakravam, Melakart Mararanjani, Melakarta Charukesi and Melakarta Sarasangi.

The name 'Bhoopeshwari' took inspiration from the Raga Bhopali. However, this raga has various names across India. Pt. Hariprasad Chaurasia, the legendary flutist, prefers the name Raga Bhoopkali, while most of the Jaipur-Atrauli Gharana musicians use Raga Prateeksha. Other variations such as Bhoopeshri, Bhoopshri, etc. are also present. In Carnatic Music, the raga is called Raga Vaasanthi.

== Technical description ==
Despite its complex origin and nomenclature, this raga is not difficult to sing. It has the same notes as Raga Bhopali/Deshkar, but instead of the Shuddha Dha, uses a Komal Dha.

- Arohana : Sa Re Ga Pa dha Sa
- Avarohan : Sa dha Pa Ga Re Sa
- Vadi is Pa and Samvadi is Sa.

== Time ==
The Raga Bhoopeshwari is a morning raga. Its designated time is the second prahar of the morning, from 6-9 a.m.

== Performances ==
Possibly due to its recent creation, this raga is not widely performed. However, it has appeared in film music, light classical music and ghazals. Notable performances of Raga Bhoopeshwari include:

- Raga Bhoopeshwari by Pt. Mani Prasad
- Raga Prateeksha by Smt. Ashwini Bhide Deshpande
- Malavun Taak Deep by Lata Mangeshkar
- Ab Ke Hum Bichhde by Mehdi Hassan
- Chadta Suraj by Aziz Nazaan

== Film Songs ==
=== Language:Tamil ===
Year	Movie	Song
1975	Avandhan Manidhan	Anbu Nadamadum
1978	Thyagam	Nallavarkkellam
1980	Nenjathai Killathe	Paruvamae (Charanam)
1982	Puthukavithai	Vaa Vaa Vasanthamey
1984	Thambikku Entha Ooru	Kaathalin Deepam Onru (Ragam Charukesi touches too)
1985	Udaya Geetham	Paadu Nilavae
1985	Geethanjali	Malare Pesu(Charanam only Pallavi in Mohanam)
1986	Nilave Malare	Sondhangalai (pallavi, anupallavi only)
1986	Aayiram Pookkal Malarattum	Kadhal Nila Theinthatho
1987	Megam Karuththirukku	Azagana Puli Mane
1987	Velundu Vinaiyillai	Unavinile Nanju vaithan
1987	Mupperum Deviyar	Thaneeril Oru Pournamani Thingal
1991	Aboorva Nanbargal	Oh Oh Vaa Vaanamea
1991	Eeramana Rojave	Adho Mega Oorvalam (Alapana in Ragam Hamsadhvani)
1992	Puthusa Padikiren Pattu	Ilaiya Manam Siragai Virikirathe
1994	Mani Rathnam	Kadhal Illaathathu
1999	Endrendrum Kadhal	Nadodi Nanba
1999	Kannupada Poguthaiya	Mookuthi Muthazhaghu
1999	Mudhalvan	Kurukku Chiruththavale
1999	Ooty	Ooty Malai
1999	Taj Mahal	Adi Manjakelange
2001	Paarthale Paravasam	Manmadha Maasam (Charanam)
2002	Raja	Chinna Chinna
2005	Moongil Nila	Kadhal Inbam Inbam (Album song with Hamsadhvani touches)
2006	Varalaru	Theeyil Vizhuntha Thaena
2008	Valluvan Vasuki	Nenje Nenje

=== Language:Hindi ===
Year	Movie	Song	Composer	Singer
1999	Hum Dil De Chuke Sanam	Tadap Tadap	Ismail Darbar	K.K, Dominique Cerejo
