= Deepan Chakravarthy =

Indian playback singer

- Born: Chakkravarthy Rajarathnam; 12 December 1956 (age 69); Chennai, India
- Occupations: Playback Singer, Actor, Reality TV Judge
- Years active: 1980–present
- Parent(s): Thiruchi Loganathan, Rajalakshmi Loganathan

Deepan Chakravarthy is an Indian playback singer. He is the son of the first playback singer in the Tamil film industry, "Isai Thendral" Thiruchi Loganathan and grandson of actress C. T. Rajakantham. His elder brother T. L. Maharajan is also a playback singer.

== Discography ==
=== As singer ===
Year	Film	Song title	Music director	Co-singer
1980	Nizhalgal	Poongathavae Thaazhthiravaa	Ilaiyaraaja	Uma Ramanan
1981	Indru Poi Naalai Vaa	Mere Pyari	Ilaiyaraaja	
1981	Enakkaga Kaathiru	Oh Nenjame	Ilaiyaraaja	S. Janaki
1981	Enakkaga Kaathiru	Pani Mazhai	Ilaiyaraaja	S. P. Sailaja
1981	Nenjil Oru Mull	Raagam Pudhu Raagam	G. K. Venkatesh	S. P. Sailaja
1981	Nenjil Oru Mull	Neragave Ketriken	G. K. Venkatesh	Vani Jairam
1981	Panneer Pushpangal	Venkaaya Sambarum	Ilaiyaraaja	S. N. Surendar & T. K. S. Kalaivanan
1981	Vaa Intha Pakkam	Aanantha Dhaagam Un Koondhal	Shyam	S. Janaki
1982	Ethanai Konam Ethanai Parvai	Vidhaitha Vidhai	Ilaiyaraaja	B. S. Sasirekha
1982	Ezhavathu Manithan	Aaduvome Pallu Paaduvome	L. Vaidyanathan	Mathangi, P. Susheela & Chandilyan
1982	Kaadhal Oviyam	Poojaikkaga Vaazhum	Ilaiyaraaja	
1982	Kaadhal Oviyam	Nathiyil Aadum	Ilaiyaraaja	S. P. Balasubrahmanyam & S. Janaki
1982	Kanavugal Karpanaigal	Pillai Prayathile	Gangai Amaran	Roopa Devi
1982	Kanavugal Karpanaigal	Kanvazhi Nenjil	Gangai Amaran	
1982	Kozhi Koovuthu	Annae Annae	Ilaiyaraaja	Samuel Grubb & G. Vidhyadar
1982	Manjal Nila	Busse Busse Coloure	Ilaiyaraaja	Sirkazhi G. Sivachidambaram & Saibaba
1982	Nadamaadum Silaigal	Mugilukkulle Oru Nila	Shankar–Ganesh	
1982	Nambinal Nambungal	Disco Sangeetham Than	Gangai Amaren	Uma Ramanan
1982	Nambinal Nambungal	Malli Kothamalli	Gangai Amaren	Malaysia Vasudevan, Uma Ramanan & S. P. Sailaja
1982	Nambinal Nambungal	Where Are You	Gangai Amaren	Uma Ramanan
1982	Nizhal Thedum Nenjangal	Idhu Kanavugal	Ilaiyaraaja	S. Janaki
1982	Om Sakthi	Abirama Valliyin	Shankar-Ganesh	Vani Jayaram
1982	Pakkathu Veettu Roja	Indha Kanngal Rendum	Shankar-Ganesh	Vani Jayaram
1982	Rani Theni	Raamanukke Seethai	Ilaiyaraaja	S. Janaki
1982	Sparisam	Aayiram Malargal Paniyil	Ravi	S. P. Sailaja
1982	Sparisam	Bayilaa Paadungadaa	Ravi	S. P. Sailaja
1983	Bhagavathipuram Railway Gate	Kaalai Nera Kaatre	Ilaiyaraaja	S. P. Sailaja
1983	Devi Sri Devi	Dhasarathaninin Thirumagalai	Ilaiyaraaja	Malaysia Vasudevan & S. Janaki
1983	Mella Pesungal	Sevvanthi Pookkalil Seidha Veedu	Ilaiyaraaja	Uma Ramanan
1983	Neeru Poottha Neruppu	Idazh Orame	Stalin Varadarajan	Vani Jayaram
1983	Valarthakada	Manjal Kulichidum Vanji	Shankar-Ganesh	Vani Jayaram
1984	Ingeyum Oru Gangai	Oru Villa Valachu	Ilaiyaraaja	Gangai Amaran, Krishnachandran, Saibaba & Ramesh
1984	Mudivalla Arambam	Aasaina Aasai	Ilaiyaraaja	Malaysia Vasudevan & Gangai Amaran
1984	Oh Maane Maane	Happy New Year	Ilaiyaraaja	Malaysia Vasudevan, Sundarrajan & S. Janaki
1984	Priyamudan Prabhu	Maana Madhurai Malligai	Ilaiyaraaja	Malaysia Vasudevan & S. Janaki
1984	Thiruttu Rajakkal	Kattabomman Oomaithorai	Shankar-Ganesh	P. Susheela, S. P. Sailaja & Sakthi Shanmugam
1984	Vaazhkai	Ennarumai Selvangal	Ilaiyaraaja	S. P. Balasubrahmanyam & S. P. Sailaja
1985	Anni	Aalamaram Pola Engal Kudumbam	Gangai Amaran	Malaysia Vasudevan & S. N. Surendar
1985	Chinna Veedu	Jaakiratha Jaakiratha	Ilaiyaraaja	Ilaiyaraaja
1985	Hello Yaar Pesurathu	Hello Aasai Deepam	Ilaiyaraaja	S. Janaki
1985	Kanni Rasi	Sorunna Satti	Ilaiyaraaja	Ilaiyaraaja, T. K. S. Kalaivanan & Krishnachandran
1985	Meendum Parasakthi	Raasaatthi Rojaa	Ilaiyaraaja	S. Janaki
1985	Padikkadha Pannaiyar	Konaadha Sengarumbu	Ilaiyaraaja	S. P. Sailaja
1985	Padikkadha Pannaiyar	Savaari Karu Savaari	Ilaiyaraaja	Malaysia Vasudevan
1985	Porutham	Anna Naamam Vaazhiye	Gangai Amaran	Malaysia Vasudevan
1986	Adutha Veedu	Koozhukkum Aasai Meesaikkum Aasai	Shankar–Ganesh	Malaysia Vasudevan & S. P. Sailaja
1986	Kanna Thorakkanum Saami	Andhi Maalaiyil	Ilaiyaraaja, Gangai Amaren	S. Janaki
1986	Kaithiyin Theerpu	Pani Malar Aadum	Ramanujam	Vani Jayaram
1986	Karimedu Karuvayan	Ulagam Suthuthada	Ilaiyaraaja	Gangai Amaran & Malaysia Vasudevan
1986	Namma Ooru Nalla Ooru	Venandaa Vittudungadaa	Gangai Amaren	Malaysia Vasudevan
1986	Namma Ooru Nalla Ooru	Azhagaana Chinna	Gangai Amaren	Malaysia Vasudevan, S. N. Surendar & Senthil
1986	Paaru Paaru Pattanam Paaru	Paavai Oru Medai	Ilaiyaraaja	Malaysia Vasudevan & B. S. Sasirekha
1986	Vidinja Kalyanam	Adiyeduthu Nadanthu	Ilaiyaraaja	Gangai Amaran, Malaysia Vasudevan & T. S. Raghavendra
1987	Manaivi Ready	Varuga Varugave Varugave	Ilaiyaraaja	S. Rajeswari
1987	Velicham	Podu Sakka Podu	Manoj–Gyan	S. Janaki
1987	Velundu Vinaiyillai	Kaayaadha Kaanagatthe	M. S. Viswanathan	
1988	Enga Ooru Kavalkaran	Arumbaagi Mottaagi	Ilaiyaraaja	P. Susheela
1988	Raththa Dhanam	Sayangalam Nangal	Gangai Amaran	S. P. Balasubrahmanyam, S. N. Surendar & Uma Ramanan
1989	Annakili Sonna Kathai	Aathukulle Yamma	Chandrabose	Vanitha
1989	Enga Ooru Mappillai	Kodupatha Koduthuttu	Ilaiyaraaja	Mano & K. S. Chithra
1989	Melam Kottu Thali Kattu	Onnu Nooraachu	Premasiri Khemadasa	
1990	Inaindha Kaigal	Chinnapoove Chinnapoove	Gyan Varma	Vidhya
1990	Inaindha Kaigal	Malaiyorum Kuyil	Gyan Varma	Vindhya
1991	Eeramana Rojave	Kalyana Tharagare	Ilaiyaraaja	Malaysia Vasudevan, Mano & S. N. Surendar
1991	Gopura Vasalile	Dhevadhai Poloru	Ilaiyaraaja	Malaysia Vasudevan, Mano & S. N. Surendar
1991	Idhayam	April Mayilae	Ilaiyaraaja	Ilaiyaraaja & S. N. Surendar
1991	Idhaya Vaasal	Eppodhum Kaadhale	Viji	
1992	Yermunai	Kanneeraiyum Senneeraiyum	Gangai Amaran	
1993	Maamiyar Veedu	Theriyamal Matti	Ilaiyaraaja	Mano, S. N. Surendar & Sunandha
1993	Naan Pesa Ninaipathellam	A For Ambika	Sirpy	Mano & Swarnalatha
1994	Amaidhi Padai	Vetri Varuthu	Ilaiyaraaja	Mano & S. N. Surendar
1994	Karuththamma	Araro Ariraro	A. R. Rahman	Theni Kunjarammal & T. K. Kala

== Filmography ==
=== Films ===
- Rani Theni (1982)
- Veeramum Eeramum (2007)
- Arasangam (2008)
- Vaamanan (2009)
- Poova Thalaiya (2011)

=== Television ===
- Megala (Sun TV)
- Magarasi (Sun TV)
