= Urimai Geetham =

- Theatrical release poster
- Directed by: R. V. Udayakumar
- Written by: R. V. Udayakumar
- Produced by: K. S. Srinivasan; K. S. Sivaraman
- Starring: Prabhu; Karthik; Pallavi; Ranjini
- Cinematography: Shiva
- Edited by: G. Jayachandran
- Music by: Manoj–Gyan
- Production company: Sivasri Pictures
- Release date: 26 February 1988
- Running time: 140 minutes
- Country: India
- Language: Tamil

Urimai Geetham (transl. Song of liberation) is a 1988 Indian Tamil-language political thriller film written and directed by R. V. Udayakumar, in his directorial debut. The film stars Prabhu and Karthik. It was released on 26 February 1988, and Udayakumar won the Best New face (Director) award at the 9th Cinema Express Awards.

== Plot ==
Bhoominathan, an honest politician, wins the election and becomes the chief minister of Tamil Nadu. A felicitation function is organised to celebrate his victory. In the function, he is assassinated by Thyagu. On the one hand, Thyagu is arrested and he denies having killed Bhoominathan. On the other hand, Bhoominathan's son, Chandru is determined to find his father's murderer. The rest of the story is what happens to Thyagu and Chandru who is the real culprit.

== Cast ==
- Prabhu as Thyagu
- Karthik as Chandru
- Pallavi as Indhu
- Ranjini as Ganga
- Charuhasan as Bhoominathan
- Typist Gopu
- Janagaraj as Ezhumalai
- Kumarimuthu
- G. Srinivasan as Dharmaraj
- M. N. Rajam as Thyagu's mother

== Production ==
Urimai Geetham is the directorial debut of Udayakumar. Editing was handled by G. Jayachandran.

== Soundtrack ==
The soundtrack was composed by the duo Manoj–Gyan, with lyrics written by the director Udayakumar. The song "Mella Mella" became popular. The audio was launched at 12 July 1987 at New Woodlands Hotel, Chennai.

Track listing
No.	Title	Singer(s)	Length
1.	"Ponmaanney"	S. P. Balasubrahmanyam, K. S. Chithra	4:15
2.	"Vidukathai"	S. P. Balasubrahmanyam, Uma Ramanan	1:59
3.	"Mella Mella"	S. P. Balasubrahmanyam, Vidya	4:19
4.	"Santhakadai"	Malaysia Vasudevan, S. N. Surendar, B. S. Sasirekha	3:46
5.	"Anju Viral"	P. Jayachandran, S. Janaki, Udayakumar	4:06
Total length:			18:25

== Release and reception ==
Urimai Geetham was released on 26 February 1988. Jayamanmadhan of Kalki said the director took an innovative story and mixed it with routine masala. Udayakumar won the Best New face (Director) award at the 9th Cinema Express Awards.
