= 7th Cinema Express Awards =

1987 Indian film awards ceremony

- Date: 12 April 1987

Highlights
- Best Picture: Samsaram Adhu Minsaram

The 7th Cinema Express Awards were held on 12 April 1987, and honoured the best of South Indian films released in 1986. The awards were announced in February.

== Tamil ==
Category	Recipient	Film
Best Film	M. Saravanan	Samsaram Adhu Minsaram
Best Actor	Vijayakanth	Amman Kovil Kizhakale
Best Actress	Lakshmi	Samsaram Adhu Minsaram
Best Director	Mani Ratnam	Mouna Ragam
Special Commendation for Direction	Visu	Samsaram Adhu Minsaram
Best New Face Actor	Ramarajan	Namma Ooru Nalla Ooru
Best New Face Actress	Rekha	Kadalora Kavithaigal
Best New Face Director	R. Aravindraj	Oomai Vizhigal
Best Music Director	T. Rajendar	Mythili Ennai Kaathali (Note: While the awards announcement also included Pookkalai Parikkatheergal, it was not mentioned during the presentation.)
Best Cameraman	Ramesh Kumar	Oomai Vizhigal
Best Comedy Actor	Senthil	Natpu
Best Comedy Actress	Kovai Sarala	Various
Best Child Artist	Baby Shalini	Nilave Malare
Best Playback Singer – Male	Malaysia Vasudevan	Various
Best Playback Singer – Female	K. S. Chithra	Various

== Telugu ==
Category	Recipient	Film
Best Film		Swathi Muthyam
Best Actor	Kamal Haasan	Swathi Muthyam
Best Actress	Radhika	Swathi Muthyam
Best Director	K. Viswanath	Swathi Muthyam

== Kannada ==
Category	Recipient	Film
Best Film		Sundara Swapnagalu
Best Actor	Shiva Rajkumar	Anand
Best Actress	Saritha	Mouna Geethe
Best Director	K. Balachander	Sundara Swapnagalu

== Malayalam ==
Category	Recipient	Film
Best Film		Vartha
Best Actor	Mohanlal	Panchagni (Note: While the awards announcement also included "other films", only Panchagni was mentioned during the presentation.)
Best Actress	Shobana	Various (Note: While the awards announcement mentioned "many films", only Rareeram was mentioned during the presentation.)
Best Director	I. V. Sasi	Vartha

== Special awards ==
Radha Ravi and Ambika were given separate special awards for Odangal and Natpu, and Thazhuvatha Kaigal, respectively.
