= S. N. Surendar =

Indian singer and actor

- Born: 17 February 1953 (age 73); Madras, Madras State (present day Tamil Nadu), India
- Occupations: Playback singer; Dubbing artist; Actor
- Children: Two, including Viraj
- Parents: P._Neelakantan (father); Lalitha Neelakandan (mother)
- Relatives: Shoba Chandrasekhar(elder sister); S. A. Chandrasekhar (brother-in-law); C. Joseph Vijay (nephew)
- Awards: Kalaimamani Award (1999)

S. N. Surendar (born 17 February 1953) is an Indian playback singer, dubbing artist and actor who primarily works in Tamil films. He has sung over 500 songs under various music directors for Telugu, Malayalam, Kannada and Tamil languages.

He is also a professional dubbing artiste and has dubbed for almost 600 films, of which more than 75 films accounts for actor Mohan.

Surendar has also done films like Yaaga Saalai as an actor.

== Personal life ==
He has an elder daughter Pallavi Surendar a playback singer now settled in Dubai & his son Hari Prashanth played the character of young Vikram in Anniyan (2005). He is the brother of Shoba Chandrasekhar, brother-in-law of S. A. Chandrasekhar, and maternal uncle of former actor and singer and 9th chief minister of Tamil Nadu C. Joseph Vijay.

== Filmography ==
=== Actor ===
- Yaaga Saalai (1980)
- Naalaiya Theerpu (1992)
- Priyamudan (1998)
- Urimai Por (1998)
- Nenjinile (1999)
- Chennai 600028 (2007)
- Ayyavazhi (2008)
- Thiraipada Nagaram (2015)
- Chennai 600028 II: Second Innings (2016)
- Ninu Veedani Needanu Nene (2019; Telugu)

=== Dubbing artist ===
Dubbed for	Films	Notes
Pratap Pothan	Nenjathai Killathe (1980); Amma (1982); Pudhumai Penn (1984); Manaivi Ready(1987)	
S. P. Balasubramaniam	Priyamanavale	Dubbed only climax and end portions
Vijaymohan	Kann Sivanthaal Mann Sivakkum	
Ashok	Oru Manithan Oru Manaivi	
Rajkumar Sethupathi	Soolam (1980)	
Anant Nag	Veeran	
Mohan Sharma	Salangai Oli (1983)	
Sreenath	Rail Payanangalil (1981)	
Mohan	From Kilinjalgal (1981) to Krishnan Vandhaan (1987)	
Karthik	Alaigal Oivathillai (1981); Paadum Paravaigal (1985)	
Vijayakanth	Sattam Oru Iruttarai (1981); Saatchi (1983); Vetri (1984)	
Kannan	Kaadhal Oviyam (1982)	
Raghuvaran	Oru Odai Nadhiyagirathu (1983)	
Anand Babu	Thangaikkor Geetham (1983); Paadum Vaanampadi (1985)	
Mahesh	Kokkarakko (1983)	
Sivankumar	Vaidehi Kathirunthal (1984)	
Arun	Thanga Mama 3D (1985)	
Dr. Rajasekhar	Pudhiya Theerppu (1985)	
Arjun	Vesham (1985)	
Vijay Babu	Padikkadavan (1985)	
Rahman	Nilave Malare (1986); Vasantha Raagam (1986); Meendum Mahaan (1987)	
Nagarjuna	En Paadal Unakkaga (1987)	
Raja	Ini Oru Sudhanthiram (1987); Valayal Satham (1987)	
V. Ravichandran	Paruva Ragam (1987)	
Nizhalgal Ravi	Thendral Puyalaanathu (1989)	
Venkatesh	Jeyithu Kaatuven (1989)	
Prabhu Raj	Oru Pudhiya Kadhai (1990)	
Harish Kumar	Nee Sirithaal Deepavali (1991)	
Subhalekha Sudhakar	Apoorva Shakthi 369 (1991)	
Rajasekhar	Chembaruthi (1991)	
Neeraj	Innisai Mazhai (1992)	
Sakthi	Manasu (2000)	
Nedumudi Venu	Anniyan (2005)	
Chandra Mohan	Stalin (2006)	
Vindu Dara Singh	Sri Rama Rajyam (2011)	Only for Tamil version
Thyagarajan	PT Sir (2024)	

== Discography ==
Year	Film	Song title	Music director	Co-singer
1966	Sadhu Mirandal	A for Apple B for Biscuit	T. K. Ramamoorthy	A. L. Raghavan, L. R. Eswari & S. N. Sundar
1967	Bama Vijayam	Varavu Ettanna Salavu Pathanna	M. S. Viswanathan	T. M. Soundararajan, P. Suseela, L. R. Eswari & S. N. Sundar
1968	Thamarai Nenjam	Aalayam Embathu Veedaagum	M. S. Viswanathan	P. Suseela & S. N. Sundar
1978	Aval Oru Pachai Kuzhanthai	Maalai Ilam Manadhil	Ilaiyaraaja	Shoba Chandrasekhar
1981	Panneer Pushpangal	Venkaaya Sambarum	Ilaiyaraaja	Deepan Chakravarthy & T. K. S. Kalaivanan
1981	Sattam Oru Iruttarai	Thanimaiyile Oru Raagam	Shankar–Ganesh	S. Janaki
1983	Saatchi	Malar Manjangal Magaranthangal	Shankar–Ganesh	Vani Jairam
1984	Ezhuthatha Sattangal	Kannuku Azhagana Maapillai	Ilaiyaraaja	Malaysia Vasudevan & S. Janaki
1984	Kudumbam	Neelagiri Poove	Gangai Amaran	S. Janaki
1984	Naan Paadum Paadal	Devan Kovil	Ilaiyaraaja	S. Janaki
1984	Vetri	Aathi Aathi Raasathiye	Shankar–Ganesh	
1984	Vetri	Oorengum Kalyaana Oorkolangal	Shankar–Ganesh	Vani Jairam
1984	Vetri	Kaaval Purindhavan Kaadhal Arindhavan	Shankar–Ganesh	Vani Jairam
1985	Geethanjali	Otharooba	Ilaiyaraaja	Malaysia Vasudevan
1985	Neethiyin Marupakkam	Kuliredukkudhunga Jagana Magana	Ilaiyaraaja	S. Janaki
1985	Pudhu Yugam	Deivam Vanghadhu	Gangai Amaran	Malaysia Vasudevan & P. Suseela
1985	Pudhu Yugam	Azhage Nee Azhalaamaa	Gangai Amaran	Shoba Chandrasekhar
1985	Puthiya Sagaptham	Puyal Veesiyadho	Gangai Amaran	
1986	Namma Ooru Nalla Ooru	Azhagana Chinna Payale	Gangai Amaran	Malaysia Vasudevan & Senthil
1986	Oomai Vizhigal	Kanmani Nillu	Manoj–Gyan	B. S. Sasirekha
1986	Oomai Vizhigal	Maamarathu Poo Edutthu	Manoj–Gyan	B. S. Sasirekha
1986	Oomai Vizhigal	Kudu Kuduththa Kizhavanukku	Manoj–Gyan	Aabavanan
1986	Vasantha Raagam	Naan Ulladhai Sollattume	M. S. Viswanathan	K. J. Yesudas & P. Suseela
1987	Evargal Indiyargal	Manjakkili Vanchikodi	Manoj–Gyan	Vani Jairam
1987	Manasa Veene (Kannada)	Ee Geluve	M. Ranga Rao	Rajkumar Bharathi & Bangalore Latha
1987	Sattam Oru Vilayaattu	Oru Kulla Nari	M. S. Viswanathan	K. J. Yesudas & Shoba Chandrasekhar
1988	Jeeva	Sangeetham Kelu Ne Kaithaalam Podu	Gangai Amaran	Malaysia Vasudevan & K. S. Chithra
1988	Rendum Rendum Anju	Kaana Karunguyile Kathal Parichayile	Gangai Amaran	Malaysia Vasudevan & K. S. Chithra
1988	Rendum Rendum Anju	Panneer Poovin Kaadhale	Gangai Amaran	K. S. Chithra
1990	Palaivana Paravaigal	Naan Raakaalam	Ilaiygangai	Sundarrajan & B. S. Sasirekha
1990	Palaivana Paravaigal	Naanga Mattum	Ilaiygangai	Malaysia Vasudevan
1991	Eeramana Rojave	Kalyana Tharagare	Ilaiyaraaja	Malaysia Vasudevan, Mano & Deepan Chakravarthy
1991	En Rasavin Manasile	Paarijatha Poove	Ilaiyaraaja	K. S. Chithra
1991	Gopura Vasalile	Dhevadhai Poloru	Ilaiyaraaja	Malaysia Vasudevan, Mano & Deepan Chakravarthy
1991	Idhayam	April Mayilae	Ilaiyaraaja	Ilaiyaraaja & Deepan Chakravarthy
1991	Sigaram	Muthamma Ennai	S. P. Balasubrahmanyam	S. P. Sailaja
1991	Thayamma	Enga Paattukku	Ilaiyaraaja	Malaysia Vasudevan & Mano
1992	Brahmachari	Vaigai Nathi	Deva	K. S. Chithra
1992	Innisai Mazhai	Mangai Nee Maangani	Ilaiyaraaja	Ilayaraaja
1992	Naalaiya Theerpu	Maapillai Naan	Manimekalai	Minmini & Manimekalai
1993	Maamiyar Veedu	Theriyamal Matti	Ilaiyaraaja	Mano, Deepan Chakravarthy & Sunandha
1993	Senthoorapandi	Maane Naane	Deva	Swarnalatha
1993	Thalattu	Vannapura	Ilaiyaraaja	
1993	Thalattu	Ennodu Potti	Ilaiyaraaja	Mano & Minmini
1993	Valli	Sandhanam Javvadhu	Ilaiyaraaja	S. P. Balasubrahmanyam
1994	Amaidhi Padai	Vetri Varuthu	Ilaiyaraaja	Mano & Deepan Chakravarthy
1994	Atha Maga Rathiname	Mampoove	Gangai Amaran	K. S. Chithra
1994	Pathavi Pramanam	Poo Mudithu Pottu Vachu	Deva	
1994	Periya Marudhu	Aalamara Vehru	Ilaiyaraaja	T. L. Maharajan
1994	Periya Marudhu	Poonthearil Yeri	Ilaiyaraaja	T. L. Maharajan
1994	Rasigan	Chillena Chillena Neer Thuli Pattu	Deva	Swarnalatha
1995	Deva	Chinna Paiyyan Chinna Ponne	Deva	K. S. Chitra
1995	Nandhavana Theru	Adichu Pudichu	Ilaiyaraaja	Mano & Arunmozhi
1995	Vishnu	Hamma Hamma	Deva	Anuradha Sriram
1996	Maanbumigu Maanavan	Mathavaram	Deva	Deva
1996	Maanbumigu Maanavan	December Mathathu	Deva	Suja
1996	Mahaprabhu	Baava Vaa	Deva	S. Janaki
1999	Periyanna	Pollachi Malai Rottula	Bharani	Malaysia Vasudevan & Swarnalatha
1999	Periyanna	Nilave Nilave (pathos)	Bharani	
1997	Kadhalukku Mariyadhai	Anandha Kuyilin Pattu	Ilaiyaraaja	Malaysia Vasudevan, Arunmozhi, K. S. Chitra & Devi
1997	Once More	Poove Poove Penpoove	Deva	K. S. Chitra
1998	Cheran Chozhan Pandian	Kadalicha Ponnu	Soundaryan	Arunmozhi & Shahul Hameed
1998	Kavalai Padathe Sagodhara	Chinna Chinna Malarondru	Ilaiyaraaja	P. Unni Krishnan, Arunmozhi & Deepika
1998	Nilaave Vaa	Akkuthe Akkuthe	Vidyasagar	Vidyasagar & Gopal Rao
1999	Endrendrum Kadhal	Jalakku Jalakku	Manoj Bhatnagar	Sujatha
1999	Nenjinile	Prime Minister Padhavi Vendaaam	Deva	Harini
1999	Sethu	Maalai En Vethanai	Ilaiyaraaja	P. Unni Krishnan & Arunmozhi
1999	Sethu	Sethuvukku Sethuvukku	Ilaiyaraaja	Arunmozhi
1999	Thirupathi Ezhumalai Venkatesa	Thirupathi Ezhumalai Venkatesa	S. A. Rajkumar	Mano & Vadivelu
2000	Good Luck	Kadikkum Jokku Onnu Sollu	Manoj Bhatnagar	K. Prabhakaran, Subha & Bhuvana
2000	Kannukkul Nilavu	Adidaa Melatthai	Ilaiyaraaja	S. P. Balasubrahmanyam & Arunmozhi
2003	Manasellam	Highwasiley Ley Ley	Ilaiyaraaja	Tippu & Karthik
2004	Virumaandi	Andha Kandamani	Ilaiyaraaja	Ilayaraaja, Kamal Haasan, Karthik Raja & Tippu
2004	Virumaandi	Karbagraham Vitu Samy Veliyerathu	Ilaiyaraaja	Ilayaraaja, Kamal Haasan, Karthik Raja & Tippu
2011	Sollitharava	Azhagiya Selai Azhaikkudhu Aadai	E. K. Bobby	

== Awards ==
- 1999:Received the Kalaimamani Award
- 2005:Won the Tamil Nadu State - Best Dubbing Artist Award.
