= Thaai Naadu =

- Poster
- Directed by: R. Aravindraj
- Written by: R. Aravindraj
- Produced by: Madampatti Sivakumar
- Starring: Sathyaraj; Radhika
- Cinematography: A. Ramesh Kumar
- Edited by: G. Jayachandran
- Music by: Manoj–Gyan
- Production company: Chemba Movies
- Release date: 16 February 1989
- Country: India
- Language: Tamil

Thaai Naadu (transl. Mother Land) is a 1989 Indian Tamil-language political action film, written and directed by R. Aravindraj. The film stars Sathyaraj and Radhika. It was released on 16 February 1989. The film was remade in Bengali Bangladesh as Atim Raja in 1998.

== Plot ==
In the 1960s, a military officer Tamizhmani is accused, inequitably, of giving intelligence to the enemy, during an operation, code named Day Break. Before he can bring out the truth, he is murdered. The murder was made up as a suicide by the criminals. Four of Tamizhmani's subordinates are suspected: his comrades-in-arms who said they were his friends. Tamizhmani's name banished forever, and his family was delivered to the vindication of the people, who set their place of residence on fire, in reprisal. Tamizhmani's son Anandhan, informed of his origins, starts an investigation to restore his honor and find the real culprits.

== Cast ==
- Sathyaraj in dual role as
  - Albert, alias Anandhan
  - Brigadier Tamizhmani, Anandhan's father
- Radhika as Julie
- M. N. Nambiar as Saleem Bhai
- Jaishankar as Christopher, Photographer officer
- Captain Raju as Ramoji alias Colonel Ramasundhar
- Srividya as Meenatchi Amma, mother of Anandhan
- Janagaraj as Samuel
- Nassar as S.K.T. alias Major S. Krishna Tulasi
- Kitty as Lieutenant Colonel Prithiviraj
- Krishnamoorthi as Raja
- Logu
- John
- Ilavarasan as Advocate Pandhiyan
- Kokila as Ramiya, Anandhan's sister & Advocate Pandhiyan's wife
- P. R. Varalakshmi as a sister
- "Hemnag" Babu

== Soundtrack ==
The music was composed by Manoj–Gyan, with lyrics by Aabavanan.

Song	Singers	Length
"Naan Mudhan Mudhal"	T. M. Soundararajan, P. Susheela	05:05
"Oh Kangale"	T. M. Soundararajan, Malaysia Vasudevan	04:47
"Oru Mullai Poo"	T. M. Soundararajan, P. Susheela	05:30
"Thaai Maman"	T. M. Soundararajan, Vani Jairam	05:11
"Thaalam Thatti"	T. M. Soundararajan	04:33

== Reception ==
N. Krishnaswamy of The Indian Express wrote, "A routine story of revenge flashily told with the script adopting a zig-zag course to hide away the cliches".
