= Sathiyavakku =

- Poster
- Directed by: R. Aravindraj
- Written by: R. Aravindraj
- Produced by: Ramavasudevan; P. Balagopi
- Starring: Prabhu; Shobana; Ramya Krishnan
- Cinematography: R. P. Imayavaramban
- Edited by: G. Jayachandran
- Music by: Gyan Varma
- Production company: Commercial Art Creations
- Release date: 23 November 1990
- Country: India
- Language: Tamil

Sathiyavakku (transl. True promise) is a 1990 Indian Tamil-language action thriller film, written and directed by R. Aravindraj. The film stars Prabhu, Shobana, and Ramya Krishnan. It was released on 23 November 1990.

== Cast ==
- Prabhu as Raja / Marudhu
- Shobana
- Ramya Krishnan
- Manorama
- Tara
- Nassar
- S. S. Chandran
- Vinu Chakravarthy
- Kitty
- Jai Ganesh

== Soundtrack ==
The music was composed by Gyan Varma.

Song	Singers	Lyrics	Length
"Yelelam Pattupaadi"	Malaysia Vasudevan	Aravindraj	3:51
"Vaigai Nadhiyodum"	K. J. Yesudas, K. S. Chithra	Aravindraj	4:24
"Oraayiram Raagangalil"	S. P. Balasubrahmanyam, Malaysia Vasudevan	Aravindraj	4:37
"Vaa Maama Onu Thamaama"	Malaysia Vasudevan, Sasirekha	Aravindraj	4:56
"Poovil Oru Vandu"	Mano, K. S. Chithra	Aravindraj	4:24

== Reception ==
The Indian Express wrote, "the film survives only because of its low-light photography, nicely choreographed suspense sequences [..] and a high decibel background score".
