= Diamond Babu =

Indian film public relations officer

Kalaimamani Diamond Babu
- Born: 16 June 1960 (age 66); Madras (now Chennai), Tamil Nadu, India
- Other name: Babu
- Occupations: public relations officer, media consultant
- Years active: 1986–present
- Spouse: Saraswathi (m. 1983)
- Children: 1
- Parent(s): Mani (Father); Sivagami (Mother)
- Awards: Kalaimamani Award (2022)

Diamond Babu is an Indian public relations officer and media consultant who predominantly works in Tamil cinema. He has worked more than 600 films as public relations officer in Indian cinema.

== Early life ==
Babu's father Mani alias Film News Anandan was one of the earliest journalists, managers and chroniclers of Tamil cinema, and he wanted his son to enter the film industry. Babu, on the other hand, was comfortably educated in Delhi and employed at a bank. To satisfy his father's wish, he left his bank job, started the "Diamond" film club and screened films for a close group at Devi Bala, Sathyam and Subham theatres in the early 80's. Tamil films faced some hiccups at the censors, and one such trouble was the reason Babu became a fully fledged PRO, since he realised that being knowledgeable in Hindi, he could be a bridge between the north and the south.

== Career ==
In 1986, when producer Aabhavanan wanted to convert a five-minute documentary into a commercial film, Babu's father canvassed for funds—the concept of crowdfunding is not new – and Babu got drawn into the struggle and was made the PRO. In 1986, when Oomai Vizhigal faced some hurdle in getting the censorship, Babu was able to liaise with the tribunal in Delhi. The film, starring Vijayakanth was a blockbuster hit. After Oomai Vizhigal his next nine films were also successive blockbuster hits and he was looked as lucky PRO in Tamil film industry.

== Awards ==
- 2022: Received title of Kalaimamani Award by the Government of Tamil Nadu, which is the highest state honour in the field of Arts

== Selected filmography ==
Key
†	Denotes films that have not yet been released

Year	Film	Role	Notes	Ref.
1986	Oomai Vizhigal	PRO		
1990	My Dear Marthandan	PRO		
1991	Captain Prabhakaran	PRO		
1992	Mannan	PRO		
1993	Kalaignan	PRO		
1994	Rajakumaran	PRO		
1999	Mannavaru Chinnavaru	PRO		
2000	Kandukondain Kandukondain	PRO		
2001	Aalavandhan	PRO		
2003	Kaakha Kaakha	PRO		
2005	Chandramukhi	PRO		
2005	Sachein	PRO		
2007	Mozhi	PRO		
2008	Abhiyum Naanum	PRO		
2009	Kanthaswamy	PRO		
2010	Aasal	PRO		
2012	Thuppakki	PRO		
2014	Arima Nambi	PRO		
2016	Theri	PRO		
2016	Kabali	PRO		
2017	Baahubali	PRO		
2017	Neruppu Da	PRO	Also Line producer	
2018	Vishwaroopam II	PRO		
2018	2.0	PRO		
2018	Thuppaki Munai	PRO		
2020	Asuraguru	PRO		

== Accolades ==
Year	Film	Category	Award	Result
2017	Theri & Kabali	Best PRO	Behindwoods Gold Medals 2017	Won
