= Good Luck (2000 film) =

- DVD cover
- Directed by: Manoj Bhatnaghar
- Written by: Manoj Bhatnaghar, B. Nithyanandham (dialogues)
- Produced by: Manoj Bhatnaghar
- Starring: Prashanth; Riya Sen; Raghuvaran; Sukanya; Vivek; Vaiyapuri; Ilavarasi
- Cinematography: K. S. Shiva
- Edited by: B. S. Vasu; Saleem
- Music by: Manoj Bhatnaghar
- Production company: Sameera Films
- Release date: 4 February 2000
- Running time: 142 minutes
- Country: India
- Language: Tamil

Good Luck is a 2000 Indian Tamil-language romantic drama film written, directed and produced by Manoj Bhatnaghar. The movie stars Prashanth, Riya Sen and Raghuvaran in main roles. The film was released on 4 February 2000.

== Plot ==
Surya is a carefree Tamil youth living in Malaysia with his brother Chandramohan and sister-in-law Devi. Chandramohan and Devi are childless because of a problem with Chandramohan. Surya falls in love with dancer Priya and manages to steal her heart too. Just when things seem happy, a bombshell is dropped by a Sister Mary who tells Surya that he is the father of a small girl Pooja. Pooja must undergo an operation to save her life but insists on seeing her dad before agreeing to the operation. Surya agrees to pose as her dad and is forced to do so on a more permanent basis even after the operation is done. He is driven out of the house and loses Priya, who agrees to wed an earlier suitor, Shyam. The person who happens to be the dad of Pooja's mother wants to kill Surya for cheating his daughter but ends up being arrested by the police. The second half shifts to Cruise ship, where Chandramohan finds out that Pooja is actually his daughter. The film ends with Surya and Priya reuniting.

== Cast ==
- Prashanth as Surya
- Riya Sen as Priya
- Raghuvaran as Chandra Mohan
- Sukanya as Devi
- Vivek
- Vaiyapuri
- Vinu Chakravarthy as Surya's uncle
- Sindhu as Sangeetha Rajan
- Sanjay Asrani as Shyam
- Diyana
- Pooja Sundharesh as Pooja
- Pandu
- Sabitha Anand as Sister Mary
- Bayilvan Ranganathan

== Production ==
The film was initially set to feature Mayuri Kango as the lead heroine, but she was later replaced by Riya Sen. The entire film was shot in Thailand and Malaysia, while significant portions were shot on a cruise ship sponsored by Star Cruises.

== Soundtrack ==
The soundtrack were composed by director Manoj Bhatnagar himself and the lyrics were written by Vairamuthu. The audio launch was held in December 1999, with Keyaar and K. T. Kunjumon attending as chief guests.

Song	Singer(s)	Duration
"Kadhal Seiyum"	S. P. Balasubrahmanyam, Sujatha	05:16
"Itho Intha Nenjodu"	S. P. Balasubrahmanyam, Chitra	04:42
"July Pathinaaru Vanthaal"	Srinivas, Sujatha, Chithra	04:25
"Kadikkum Jokku "	S. N. Surendar, K. Prabhakaran, Subha, Bhuvana, Chorus	04:54
"Idhayam Thudikkirathe"	K. Prabhakaran, Chithra, Baby Deepika	05:04
"Naane Nee Nee"	P. Unnikrishnan, Sujatha	04:40

== Reception ==
The Hindu wrote, "There are a couple of loose ends and the director must have concentrated more on the screenplay and less on the grandeur and glamour aspects of the film." K. N. Vijiyan of New Straits Times wrote "Manoj has concentrated on giving a visual delight". Malini Mannath of Chennai Online wrote "The screenplay is weekly etched with many lose ends and unanswered questions. At times the continuity in shots and scenes is missing. A part of the time and energy spent on the luxury liner could have been spent in working out a better screenplay". Despite the relative failure of the film, Manoj Bhatnagar announced his next film soon after, a collaboration with actor Madhavan, which then failed to take off.
