= Musthaffaa =

- Title card
- Directed by: R. Aravindraj
- Written by: K. Prasanna
- Based on: Musthaffaa by K. Prasanna
- Produced by: P. G. Shrikanth
- Starring: Napoleon; Ranjitha
- Cinematography: K. Rajpreeth
- Edited by: R. T. Annadurai
- Music by: Vidyasagar
- Production company: S. G. S. Cinearts International
- Release date: 16 February 1996
- Running time: 140 minutes
- Country: India
- Language: Tamil

Musthaffaa is a 1996 Indian Tamil-language crime drama film directed by R. Aravindraj and written by K. Prasanna. It is based on Prasanna's novel of the same name. The film stars Napoleon and Ranjitha, with Goundamani, Mansoor Ali Khan, Prasanna, Lakshmi, Kazan Khan, Alex, Sooriya, Rajeshkumar, Babloo Prithiveeraj, Ganeshkar and Charmila playing supporting roles. It was released on 16 February 1996. The film was later remade into Hindi as Ghulam-E-Musthafa (1997) in Bangladeshi Bengali as Abbajan (2001) and in Indian Bengali as Rehmat Ali (2010).

== Plot ==
Musthaffaa is the trusted henchman of the godfather Periyavar. When politicians need help, they notify Periyavar, and Musthaffaa solves the problem with his sidekick Chellappa. Musthaffaa considers Periyavar his own father and calls him Vappa (father in Tamil Muslim), whilst he considers Chellappa as his own elder brother.

In the meantime, Sundaresan is appointed as a government office worker, and he has persistently refused bribes. Being from a middle-class orthodox Brahmin family, Sundaresan lives with his sick wife Bhagyalakshmi, daughter Lalitha, and son Ramkumar. Lalitha falls in love with Lakshmanan, while Ramkumar wants to become an engineer. Lakshmanan's family asks for a huge dowry for the wedding, and the engineering college principal asks them for a huge amount to enroll their son. Without enough revenue, they refuse both proposals. When Musthaffaa learns of their problem, he pressures Sundaresan to sign some contracts without examining them in exchange for bribes, but they still refuse.

Musthaffaa shares enmity with Kaalaiya, who wants to kill Periyavar. Meanwhile, a dancer named Kavitha, who works in Kaalaiya's dance club, is saved by Musthaffaa from Kaalaiya's henchmen. With Musthaffaa's help, Kavitha becomes a Bharata Natyam teacher. She develops a soft corner for him, and they finally decide to marry. In the meantime, Bhagyalakshmi's asthma has worsened, and she is hospitalised. To treat her, Sundaresan must disburse a huge amount. The next day, the vigilance officer Rajaram, dressed as a civilian, tries to corrupt the officers, but only Sundaresan accepts. Sundaresan is subsequently arrested for corruption.

Kaalaiya plans to kill Periyavar, so his son puts a bomb in his car. Unfortunately, Kavita is killed in the car blast before their wedding. Thereafter, Musthaffaa turns berserk and kills Kaalaiya's son. Musthaffaa decides to become a good man, so he helps Sundaresan's family and lives with them. Periyavar becomes upset over Musthaffaa's decision. First, the relationship between Musthaffaa and Sundaresan's family was tense, but later they lived together harmoniously.

During the Legislative Assembly election, violence is in full swing between the ruling and opposition parties. Periyavar, on the ruling party's side, cannot control it without Musthaffaa, while Kaalaiya, on the opposition party's side, is gaining in power with Rajaram's aid. Musthaffaa decides to take the last job to finance Lalitha's wedding, ensure Ramkumar's education, get Sundaresan's job back, and treat Bhagyalakshmi's asthma. Finally, Musthaffaa kills Kaalaiya, and the ruling party wins the election. Minister Sathyanathan congratulates Musthaffaa for his work; Musthaffaa requests that Sathyanathan handle the problems peacefully, but it does not please Sathyanathan. During Lalitha's wedding, Musthaffaa is arrested by the police, but as a transformed person, he accepts the sentence. There, in a twist of fate, Periyavar's henchman shoots Musthaffaa in the back, and he dies in Periyavar's arms. Periyavar orders to kill him because of fear of reprisal and self-interest. In turn, Chellappa murders Periyavar and is arrested.

== Cast ==
- Napoleon as Musthaffaa
- Ranjitha as Kavitha
- Goundamani as Chellappa
- Mansoor Ali Khan as Kaalaiya
- K. Prasanna as Sundaresan
- Lakshmi as Bhagyalakshmi
- Charmila as Lalitha
- Ganeshkar as Ramkumar
- Kazan Khan as Rajaram
- Alex as Kaalaiya's henchman
- Soorya as Periyavar
- Rajeshkumar as Kaalaiya's son
- Babloo Prithiveeraj as Lakshmanan
- Suryakanth as Periyavar's henchman
- Kumarimuthu as Government worker
- Prathapachandran as Sathyanathan
- T. S. Raghavendra as Lakshmanan's father
- P. R. Varalakshmi as Lakshmanan's mother
- Vaithi
- Swaminathan as Government worker
- Janaki as Kavitha's mother
- Murali Kumar as Government worker
- Mythili
- Jayamani

== Production ==
K. Prasanna had written Musthaffaa as a serial in the weekly magazine Ananda Vikatan and had also staged it as a play. Impressed by the story, the producer P. G. Shrikanth decided to make into a film, with Prasanna retained as screenwriter.

== Soundtrack ==
The music was composed by Vidyasagar, with lyrics written by Vairamuthu.

Song	Singer(s)	Duration
"Kadhalar Mattum"	Mano, Swarnalatha	4:33
"Kalapu Mayile"	Mano, Malgudi Subha, Vidyasagar	4:22
"Kannukkum Kannukkum"	Hariharan, Sadhana Sargam, Santhan, Gopal Sharma	4:51
"Vallavanda Vallavanda"	Mano, Chorus	2:49
"Vaya Mappillai"	Swarnalatha	4:31

== Reception ==
K. Vijayan of New Straits Times praised the actor Napoleon and said, "whatever inadequacies Musthaffaa had in the first half is redeemed in the second half". Kalki felt Napolean's acting and dialogue delivery is routine but called Goundamani's presence as relief and called Charmila and cinematography as plus points but found music as average and the length could have been trimmed. The Hindu wrote, "Napoleon emerges as a character actor of class while essaying a difficult role of a Muslim ruffian turning a protector of a middle class Hindu family, which still believes in old values", adding that the title character "attains great proportions thanks to the dialogue and screenplay of Prasanna".
