= Film News Anandan =

Indian film historian and photographer

- Born: Mani; 1 January 1926 or 1928 (Note: Both Udhav Naig of The Hindu and the Press Trust of India state Anandan's year of birth to be 1926, while Sudhish Kamath of The Hindu, and Jyothsna of Behindwoods state the year of birth to be 1928.)
- Died: 21 March 2016; Chennai, Tamil Nadu, India
- Occupations: Film historian, photographer, public relations officer
- Children: 3 (including Diamond Babu)
- Parent: P. K. Gnanasagaram (Father)

Film News Anandan (born Mani) was an Indian film historian and photographer based in Chennai, Tamil Nadu. He was popularly known as the "walking encyclopedia" of Tamil cinema.

== Early life ==
Anandan was born as Mani. His father P. K. Gnanasagaram was a government servant. When he was being admitted in school he told his principal his name was Anandakrishnan, which later became his legal name, and was further shortened to Anandan. After school, he joined Quaide Millath Arts college, then known as Government Arts college. When he was a college student, he had a chance to interact with the drama troupes of Y. G. Parthasarathy and M. G. Ramachandran among others. He used to write the dialogues, do stage management and help in small odd jobs.

== Career ==
Anandan was interested in becoming a cameraman and joined as an assistant to C. J. Mohan, who was the cameraman for Kalaivanar. He conducted photography classes for him. Mohan appreciated the photos of Anandan and asked him to buy a Rolliflex camera. After buying one, actor Sivaji Ganesan was the first person whom he had captured on camera. Anandan worked as a news reporter for Film Chamber and his job was to collect details about the actors, producer, director of a film. Devarajan of the magazine Film News once asked Anandan to take pictures for his magazine. When the pictures were published, credit in the magazine was given as "Film News Anandan" and eventually the pen name got prefixed to his name.

Anandan noticed publicity stills of Nadodi Mannan (1958) on film producer R. M. Veerappan's office desk when he happened to visit the office of Em.Gee.Yar Pictures. He then offered to distribute them to the press. Veerappan agreed knowing that Anandan was then a member of the South Indian Film Journalists Association. After a few days, stills of the film were published in many magazines. M. G. Ramachandran, who was the director of Nadodi Mannan, was impressed with Anandan's work and, at Veerappan's suggestion, hired him as the film's public relations officer (PRO). This was Anandan's debut film as a PRO.

As an actor, Anandan's first film was Policekaran Magal (1962) where he played a police photographer. He reprised the role in its Telugu remake Constable Koothru. In Bommai (1964), he plays a doctor. In Natchathiram (1980), he played the role of a press reporter, posing questions to a disillusioned star. In the 1986 crime film Oomai Vizhigal, he played a press photographer. In Sugamana Sumaigal (1992), he played the role of the heroine’s father. He also made appearances in Aasai (1995) and Indian (1996), though his scenes were deleted in both; however, in the former, the credits read, "Thanks to Film News Anandan". In March 2016, just a few days before his death, Anandan revealed that his dream was to have a permanent exhibition on cinema.

== Personal life ==
Anandan was married to Sivagami. They had two daughters and a son Diamond Babu, who is also a PRO.

== Death ==
Anandan died on 21 March 2016 after a week in hospital with breathing problems.

== Awards ==
Anandan received Y. Venkanna Clowdary's "Kala Peedam" award for his tremendous contribution to Human Progress as a Film Historian. In 1991, the Tamil Nadu State Government awarded him with their highest honour in the title of Kalaimaamani. In 1989, Anandan was honoured as a veteran during the Golden Jubilee of the Film Chamber. He was awarded the "Kalai Selvam" title by the South Indian Artist Association in Chennai. In May 2008 at the 2nd Vijay Awards, he was awarded the Vijay Award for Contribution to Tamil Cinema.

== Tamil films database ==
Anandan compiled a wide-scale database of Tamil films which was made into a book titled Sadhanaigal Padaitha Thamizh Thiraipada Varalaru ("History of Landmark Tamil Films") with the help of the Tamil Nadu State Government and was published on 23 October 2004 by Sivagami Publications.
