= Dampatyam =

- Theatrical release poster
- Directed by: A. Kodandarami Reddy
- Screenplay by: A. Kodandarami Reddy
- Story by: Satya Murthy
- Produced by: R. V. Krishna Rao
- Starring: Akkineni Nageswara Rao; Jayasudha
- Cinematography: S. Navakanth
- Edited by: S. Venkataratnam
- Music by: Chakravarthy
- Production company: Anuradha Art Combines
- Release date: 12 July 1985
- Country: India
- Language: Telugu

Dampatyam (transl. Married Life) is a 1985 Telugu-language drama film, produced by R. V. Krishna Rao under the Anuradha Art Combines banner and directed by A. Kodandarami Reddy. It stars Akkineni Nageswara Rao, Jayasudha and music composed by Chakravarthy. The film was remade in the Tamil as Thambathyam (1987).

== Cast ==
- Akkineni Nageswara Rao as Dr. Satya Murthy
- Jayasudha as Janaki
- Murali Mohan as Inspector Arun Kumar
- Gummadi
- Rallapalli
- Eeswar Rao
- Raj Varma
- Nalinikanth as Nalinikanth
- Suhasini as Dr. Lalitha
- Tulasi as Aruna
- Rajyalakshmi as Jyothi
- Kalpana Rai as Chipuchitti Venkamma

== Soundtrack ==
Dampatyam

Film score by Chakravarthy
- Released: 1984
- Genre: Soundtrack
- Length: 16:37
- Label: AVM Audio
- Producer: Chakravarthy

Chakravarthy chronology
Bharyabhartala Bhandam (1985)	Dampatyam (1984)	Illale Devata (1985)

Music composed by Chakravarthy. Lyrics were written by Veturi. The music was released on AVM Audio Company.

S. No.	Song title	Singers	length
1	"Andala Aliveni"	S. P. Balasubrahmanyam	3:01
2	"Koyile Koyila Padumma"	S. P. Balasubrahmanyam, P. Susheela	4:39
3	"Doctor Garandi"	S. P. Balasubrahmanyam, P. Susheela	4:25
4	"Mallemogga Rada Raave"	S. P. Balasubrahmanyam, P. Susheela	4:32
5			
6			
