= R. Aravindraj =

Indian film director and screenwriter

- Occupations: Director, screenwriter
- Years active: 1986–present
- Notable work: Oomai Vizhigal (1986)

R. Aravindraj is an Indian film director and screenwriter who has worked on Tamil films. He rose to fame after making the thriller film Oomai Vizhigal (1986) featuring Vijayakanth and has continued to make films in a similar genre.

== Career ==
Aravindraj rose to fame after making the crime thriller film Oomai Vizhigal (1986) featuring Vijayakanth and Arun Pandian, which focused on a journalist making an investigation into the case of missing girls. The film became a trendsetter, with several filmmakers, including Aravindraj himself, choosing to make films of a similar genre. He often collaborated in ventures with writers Aabavanan, Vijayakanth, and Arun Pandian throughout the late 1980s and early 1990s. Following the failure of Musthaffaa (1996), Aravindraj was forced to cancel a project titled News starring Ramki and Vijayashanti, and another project titled Ayudapadai with Yugendran, before going on a sabbatical. In 2001, he agreed terms with producer Ibrahim Rowther to make a film titled Pesum Vizhigal with Jaivijay, the son of actor Jaishankar, but the producer's financial troubles meant that the film was shelved.

He later moved on to make a television serial titled Soolam, which ran for two years, and also appeared as an actor in a few serials. He attempted to make a comeback to films through a venture titled Ayuthapadai. Still, the film did not have a theatrical release, and another project titled Pesum Vizhigal failed to proceed after the launch. Subsequently, in 2010, he went on to make a political thriller titled Irandu Mugam, starring Sathyaraj and Karan. Aravindraj also acted in the film, which had a low-key release and performed below average at the box office. In 2013, he revealed that he had finished work on a film titled Kavithai, which was shot in a single room featuring a single actress. The only role in the film was portrayed by Aravindraj's daughter Mahakeerthi, but the film remains unreleased.

== Filmography ==
=== Director ===
Year	Film	Notes
1986	Oomai Vizhigal	
1987	Uzhavan Magan	
1989	Thaai Naadu	
1990	Sathya Vaakku	Also lyricist
1993	Thanga Pappa	Also lyricist
1995	Karuppu Nila	
1996	Musthaffaa	
2010	Irandu Mugam	
2025	Desiya Thalaivar	

=== Writer ===
- Puta 109 (2018; Kannada)

=== Actor ===
- Innoruvan (2009)
- Adhe Kangal (2017)
- Kasada Tabara (2021); Streaming release
- Vettaiyan (2024)
- Seesaw (2025)
- Shakthi Thirumagan (2025)

=== Lyricist ===
- Uzhiyan (1994)

== Television ==
As director

Year	Name of Television Show	Network	Notes
2017-2018	Vani Rani	Sun TV	Epi 1448-1520

As actor

Year	Name of Television Show	Network
2017–2018	Neeli	Star Vijay
2018–2020	Aranmanai Kili	Star Vijay
2019	Nila	Sun TV
2020	Naam Iruvar Namakku Iruvar	Star Vijay
2020	Time Enna Boss!?	Disney+ Hotstar
2021–2024	Baakiyalakshmi	Star Vijay
2021	Pandian Stores	Star Vijay
2022	Kana Kaanum Kaalangal	Star Vijay
2023	Kanne Kalaimaane	Star Vijay
2024	Super Singer Season 10	Star Vijay
2025	Nadu Center	JioHotstar
