= Vairagyam =

1987 film directed by K. Vijayan

- Theatrical release poster
- Directed by: K. Vijayan
- Written by: Aaroor Dass (dialogues)
- Produced by: K. Balaji
- Starring: Sowcar Janaki; Prabhu; Radha
- Cinematography: G. Or. Nathan
- Edited by: D. Vasu
- Music by: Manoj–Gyan
- Production company: Sujatha Films
- Release date: 15 August 1987
- Country: India
- Language: Tamil

Vairagyam (transl. Stubbornness) is a 1987 Indian Tamil-language film directed by K. Vijayan and produced by K. Balaji. The film stars Sowcar Janaki, Prabhu and Radha. It was released on 15 August 1987.

== Plot ==
The film depicts Annapoorni as a wealthy, arrogant woman.

== Cast ==
- Sowcar Janaki as 500 Acre Annapoorni
- Prabhu as Raja
- Radha as Radha, Annapoorni's daughter
- Jaishankar as Sadanandam, Annapoorni's husband
- Vijayakumari as Raja's Mother
- Vinu Chakravarthy as Muthaiyan, Annapoorni's cousin
- Ramji as Seenu, Muthaiyan son
- Janagaraj as Suana pana, Annapoorni Manager
- Manorama as Janagaraj Wife
- Haja Sheriff as Krishnaraj,
- Ennathe Kannaiah as Driver
- Loose Mohan as Spanner Muthu, Raja Assistant

== Soundtrack ==
The soundtrack was composed by Manoj–Gyan.

Track listing
No.	Title	Lyrics	Singer(s)	Length
1.	"Azhage Azhugai Enna"	Vairamuthu	S. P. Balasubrahmanyam, S. Janaki	4:11
2.	"Machanai Thottal Enna"	Vairamuthu	S. P. Balasubrahmanyam, S. Janaki	4:27
3.	"Jimthanakadi Jimthanakadi Jin"	Pulamaipithan	S. P. Balasubrahmanyam	4:41
4.	"Karotti Vandha Kutti Rasathi"	Pulamaipithan	S. P. Balasubrahmanyam	4:15
Total length:				17:34

== Reception ==
Vairagyam was released on 15 August 1987. N. Krishnaswamy of The Indian Express wrote, "The taming of the shrew portions, true to the tenor of the film, are rude, rough and rumbustious, chockful with hot-air rhetoric against the rich." The film was also reviewed by Jayamanmadhan of Kalki.
