= Uzhavan Magan =

- Poster
- Directed by: R. Aravindraj
- Written by: Aabavanan
- Produced by: A. S. Ibrahim Rowther
- Starring: Vijayakanth; Radhika; Radha; Radha Ravi
- Cinematography: A. Ramesh Kumar
- Edited by: G. Jayachandran
- Music by: Manoj–Gyan
- Production company: Rowther Films
- Release date: 21 October 1987
- Running time: 171 minutes
- Country: India
- Language: Tamil

Uzhavan Magan (transl. The Peasant's Son) is a 1987 Indian Tamil-language action drama film, directed by R. Aravindraj and produced by A. S. Ibrahim Ravuthar. The film stars Vijayakanth, Radhika, Radha and Radha Ravi. It was released on 21 October 1987.

== Plot ==
Chinna Durai, a farmer lives quietly in his village when Nirmala and Gunasekhar intervene to wreak havoc.

For revenge, Nirmala's family and Chinna Durai's father insist on getting married. While the wedding is in preparation, Gunasekhar's troops twist the neck of Durai's father. Chinna Durai seeing him dead, is embarked on Guna's general surprise and his relatives for attempted murder to the police leaving her lover Selvi.

While Chinna Durai is in prison, the younger brother Siva says that he wants to get revenge for Guna making her new husband believe in Nirmala but already had a positive relationship in the past. Chinna Durai delivered and his brother Siva will now recover their father's property.

== Cast ==
- Vijayakanth in dual role as
  - Chinna Durai
  - Siva
- Radhika Sarathkumar as Selvi
- Radha as Nirmala
- Radha Ravi as Gunasekharan
- M. N. Nambiar as Marudhamalai Gounder
- Malaysia Vasudevan as Nirmala's father
- S. S. Chandran as Accountant
- Senthil as Chinna Durai's friend
- Pandari Bai as Guna's mother
- A. Sakunthala as Guna's sister
- Kovai Sarala as Accountant's daughter
- Kullamani as Chinna Durai's friend

== Production ==
Vijayakanth agreed to act in the film without listening to the story. Art director GK revealed that the film's rekla race scene inspired from the chariot scene from Ben-Hur (1959) was shot on a set built on bamboo platform "at a possible height for five miles in length and 100 meters in breadth".

== Soundtrack ==
The soundtrack was composed by Manoj–Gyan, and the lyrics were written by Aabavanan.

Track listing
No.	Title	Singer(s)	Length
1.	"Semmari Aade"	S. P. Balasubrahmanyam, Vijaya, Yugendran	4:32
2.	"Solli Tharava"	S. P. Balasubrahmanyam, Sasirekha	5:26
3.	"Unnai Thinam Thedum"	T. M. Soundararajan, Sasirekha	5:44
4.	"Pon Nel"	M. Vasudevan	4:36
5.	"Varahu Chamba"	Sasirekha	4:39
6.	"Matthapoo"	M. Vasudevan	4:11
Total length:			29:08

== Release and reception ==
Uzhavan Magan was released on 21 October 1987 alongside another Vijayakanth film Sattam Oru Vilaiyattu and it faced heavy competition from Nayakan and Manithan. However, all films went on to become successful in box-office. N. Krishnaswamy of The Indian Express wrote, "[..] the narrative lacks believability, because there isn't any feeling in this film". Jayamanmadhan of Kalki praised Vijayakanth and Radha and also praised Vijayakanth's stunt choreography especially the picturisation of rekla race and found the film similar to the films starring M. G. Ramachandran. Balumani of Anna praised the acting, music, cinematography, humour and direction.
