= Oomai Vizhigal =

- Poster
- Directed by: R. Aravindraj
- Written by: Aabavanan
- Produced by: Aabavanan
- Starring: Vijayakanth; Arun Pandian; Chandrasekhar; Jaishankar; Ravichandran; Karthik
- Cinematography: A. Ramesh Kumar
- Edited by: G. Jayachandran
- Music by: Manoj–Gyan; Aabavanan
- Production company: Thirai Chirpi
- Release date: 15 August 1986
- Running time: 176 minutes
- Country: India
- Language: Tamil

Oomai Vizhigal (transl. Mute eyes) is a 1986 Indian Tamil-language crime thriller film directed by R. Aravindraj. The film stars Vijayakanth, Arun Pandian, Karthik, Chandrasekhar and Jaishankar, along with Ravichandran and Malaysia Vasudevan in a negative role. Produced and written by Aabavanan, it was released on 15 August 1986 and became a major success.

== Plot ==
A group of college girls, driving a light blue matador, arrive at Chola Picnic Village. They book a hotel room with a picnic spot. At night they go out to the beach, light a bonfire, and enjoy singing and dancing. After the song ends, the girls return to the hotel. One of the girls, Vasanthi, separates from the group. She comes across a pi-shaped bell stand and rings it three times. A man, P.R.K, appears riding on a carriage. He looks into her eyes, and rides Vasanthi down, grabbing her hair and kidnapping her.

The next scene shows Raja entering the Chola Picnic Village. He takes some photos and comes across the pi-shaped bell stand. A beldam is found to sit below it, and he snaps a photo of her. Wandering farther, he finds a priest and introduces himself as Assistant Editor for the Dhinamurasu Magazine. Raja asks about a girl's body, that four to five days ago, was found floating by the Picnic Village's beach. He says that the police reported the murder as a suicide and that he would like some clarifications. The priest refuses to answer, and Raja takes a photo of him. Lakshmana, the younger brother of P.R.K, shows up, smoking a cigarette. Raja leaves.

Chandran is the editor of the Dhinamurasu Magazine. He and Raja develop the photos and Chandran asks Raja how he is getting such sensational news. Raja tells Chandran he has a source in the suspect's house. Her name is Uma, and she is a stenographer. The suspect is none other than MLA Sattanathan. The phone rings in the MLA's house and Velu asks Uma to answer the phone. She picks up the phone and says that a person named P.R.K wants to talk with MLA. Uma overhears their conversation through her phone. P.R.K tells Sattanathan that an editor came to Picnic Village to inquire about the girl's death. Sattanathan says that he will take care of it.

The next morning, Chandran receives a phone call at his office from an inspector who asks why the newspaper is carrying on an unnecessary investigation. Chandra tells him to mind his words. Vijay, a friend of Raja, joins the magazine. Raja and Vijay stay in Devi's house for rent. The next day, Raja brings Uma's blind father and leaves in her house. There Devi is found seating. He says to her that in two-three days he wants some clarification's regarding the Picnic Village. Vijay and Devi were in love as well as Raja and Uma. At the birthday of Uma, Uma was killed by MLA in front of Raja. The case is sent to DSP Deenathayalan for investigation.

Then the scene shifts to a newly married couple, Ramesh and Shanthi, honeymooning at Chola Picnic Village. They spend the time merrily, but during that time they are being watched by the beldam. By the time Maamarathu poo song finishes, it becomes night and when the couples are involved in a romance in the hotel room, P.R.K comes and makes Karthik fall down unconscious. Then Shanthi escapes from the village, where she is being helped by a passerby whose car suddenly stops. When P.R.K opens the gate of the village and approaches her to kill her the car starts and that passerby admit her at a hospital. He also informs Vijay about a girl who was coming undressed from the village and he has admitted her to a hospital. By the time Raja arrives there, one of Sattanathan's people goes there to kill Shanthi. He hides in Shanthi's room to kill her. Raja comes there in time and he is stabbed by that thug. Raja also kills that thug and brings Shanthi to DSP's house and dies there. Vijay gets disheartened on seeing this. Then Peter, Ramesh, and Vijay all join hands in order to know the reason why P.R.K does this. After this P.R.K gets everyone and chains them. He also reveals that he loved someone, especially her eyes but she cheated, so he wanted to take eyes from the girls he sees, actually, Beldam is his stepmother who gives him info about the girls. At last, DSP gets to know about this and punishes everyone. Ramesh and Shanthi rejoin thus making the end of silent eyes.

== Cast ==
- Vijayakanth as DSP Deenadayalan
- Arun Pandian as Vijay
- Chandrasekhar as Raja
- Jaishankar as Chandran
- Ravichandran as P.R.K
- Karthik as Ramesh
- Srividya as Lakshmi
- Saritha as Sumathi
- Kokila as Devi, Vijay's lover
- Malaysia Vasudevan as MLA Sattanathan
- Senthil
- Ilavarasi as Selvi Uma, Raja's lover
- Kishmu as Godhandaraman
- Visu as Rathnasabapathy
- Sangeeta as Asha, P.R.K's lover
- Thengai Srinivasan as Devi's father
- Sachu as Devi's mother
- Thyagu as Velu
- Kumarimuthu
- Film News Anandan as the press photographer
- Diamond Babu as the press photographer
- Loose Mohan as Samarasam
- Sasikala as Shanti, Ramesh's wife
- Meesai Murugesan
- Disco Shanti in an item number as Vasanthi
- S R Janaki as PRK's foster mother

== Production ==
Oomai Vizhigal was inspired by a series of murders that took place in a tribal village in Tamil Nadu. It was the first film edited by G. Jayachandran.

== Soundtrack ==
The music was composed by Manoj–Gyan and additional music by Aabavanan; the latter also wrote the lyrics. The song "Tholvi Nilayenna" is set to the Carnatic raga Shivaranjani.

Song	Singer(s)	Duration
"Kanmani Nillu"	S. N. Surendar, B. S. Sasirekha	4:46
"Maamarathu Poo"	S. N. Surendar, B. S. Sasirekha	4:30
"Rathiri Nerathu"	B. S. Sasirekha	4:35
"Tholvi Nilayenna"	P. B. Srinivas, Aabhavanan	4:07
"Nilaimaarum Ulagil"	K. J. Yesudas	4:32
"Kudukuduppai"	Aabhavanan, S. N. Surendar	3:57

== Release and reception ==
Oomai Vizhigal was released on 15 August 1986. Ananda Vikatan lauded the cinematography as being on par with Hollywood standards, but criticised the screenplay for being dragged. Jayamanmadhan of Kalki wrote it is great to keep the suspense alive for eighteen reels by stirring up curiosity for what is next. Balumani of Anna praised the acting, music, cinematography and noted this film, made by the students of the film institute, felt like a film made by an experienced team. At the 7th Cinema Express Awards, Aravindraj won the award for Best New Face Director, and Ramesh Kumar won for Best Cameraman.

== Legacy ==
The film's success established a trend of students graduated from film institute entering the film industry and directing films.

== Dropped sequel ==
Post-success, Aabavanan planned a sequel for the film titled Moongil Kottai with the same cast and crew. The film however was shelved after nearly 50% of the film due to escalated budget.

== Bibliography ==
- Dhananjayan, G. (2011). The Best of Tamil Cinema, 1931 to 2010: 1977–2010. Galatta Media. OCLC 733724281.
