= Thambathyam =

- Poster
- Directed by: K. Vijayan
- Written by: Valampuri Somanathan (dialogues)
- Story by: Satya Murthy
- Produced by: T. S. Kalyani
- Starring: Sivaji Ganesan; Ambika; Radha; Tulasi
- Cinematography: Viswanath Rai
- Edited by: Chezhiyan
- Music by: Manoj–Gyan
- Production company: Kalyani Cine Arts
- Release date: 20 November 1987
- Country: India
- Language: Tamil

Thambathyam (transl. Intimacy) is a 1987 Indian Tamil-language film, directed by K. Vijayan and produced by T. S. Kalyani. The film stars Sivaji Ganesan, Ambika and Radha. It is a remake of the Telugu film Dampatyam.

== Plot ==
Dr. Sathyamoorthy is a renowned heart surgeon with a loving wife, Janaki, as well as two daughters, Jyothi and Aruna. Janaki's father also lives with the family. Janaki is the loving but forgetful matriarch and the family abide by her wishes in most things. Jyothi falls for an aspiring lawyer. Aruna is a reporter who falls in love with inspector Venkatesh who's searching for his sister Latha's murderer. Sathyamoorthy and Janaki approve of their daughters' respective loves and arrange the weddings. While wedding shopping, Sathyamoorthy runs into Jaggu an old acquaintance with an ax to grind. He goes to Venkatesh with proof that Sathyamoorthy killed Latha. Sathyamoorthy is arrested and the happy family is thrown into disarray. The rest of the family must now uncover the truth behind Latha's murder.

== Cast ==
- Sivaji Ganesan as Sathyamoorthy
- Ambika as Janaki
- Radha as Latha
- Tulasi as Aruna
- Kalaiselvi as Jyothi
- V. K. Ramasamy as Shanthi's grandfather
- Prasath as Jaganathan (Jaggu)
- Vennira Aadai Moorthy
- Pandiyan
- Janarthanan as Inspector Venkatesh

== Soundtrack ==
The soundtrack was composed by Manoj–Gyan.

Track listing
No.	Title	Singer(s)	Length
1.	"Sonna Kelunga"	Surendar, Uma Ramanan
2.	"Geetham Vandhudhu"	Vani Jairam, Malaysia Vasudevan
3.	"Kannane"	Vani Jairam, Vijay Ramani
4.	"Nenjil Oru Raagam"	Vani Jairam

== Reception ==
Balumani of Anna praised acting and music but felt Somanathan's screenplay lacks clarity hence the film appears boring at every instance and also noted it would have been a great film if the same concentration was given in the film's second half.
