= Ivargal Indiyargal =

- Title card
- Directed by: Om Sakthi S. Jagadeesan
- Screenplay by: Om Sakthi S. Jagadeesan
- Story by: Sakthidasan; C. Ganesan
- Produced by: Ja. Gurumurthy
- Starring: Ramarajan; Madhuri; Lakshmi
- Cinematography: Ganesh Pandian
- Edited by: V. Jayapal
- Music by: Manoj–Gyan
- Production company: Om Selvi Arts
- Release date: 10 July 1987
- Country: India
- Language: Tamil

Ivargal Indiyargal (transl. They are Indians) is a 1987 Indian Tamil-language film directed by Om Sakthi S. Jagadeesan, starring Ramarajan, Madhuri and Lakshmi. It was released on 10 July 1987.

== Plot ==
Petition Periyanayaki is a social worker known for filing petitions on every social issue she encounters, striving to correct injustices and fight corruption. Periyanayaki's former love interest, Rangabashyam's daughter, Savitri, arrives from Trichy to meet Periyanayaki so she can seek employment in Madras while staying at her house. Periyanayaki learns that Savitri lost her mother at a young age and begins to treat her like her own daughter.

Ramu, a lower-middle-class, hardworking youth, juggles multiple part-time jobs while sharing a room with his carefree friend Prakash, who indulges in alcohol and women. Ramu works as a sincere clerk at the same office where Savitri joins, and she develops an admiration for Ramu. Soon, Prakash secures a job in America and leaves, and Savitri notices Ramu's disciplined lifestyle, beginning to try to get closer to him playfully. Periyanayaki realizes that Savitri is in love with Ramu and advises her to remain steadfast if her love is genuine, unlike herself. Despite Savitri's attempts to win Ramu's affection, he does not reciprocate her feelings. To unite them, Periyanayaki asks Savitri to move into Ramu's room. She then falsely files a complaint accusing Ramu of kidnapping Savitri. Believing the accusation, the police arrest Ramu, forcing him to marry Savitri.

Resentful of being coerced into marriage, Ramu distances himself from Savitri. He takes her to his village and introduces her to his family—his mother, Maragatham, and three younger sisters, Shenbagam, Malliga, and Thamarai, whose marriages and responsibilities rest on his shoulders. Villagers gossip about Ramu marrying before arranging his sisters' weddings. Understanding his burden, Savitri decides that they will not consummate their marriage until his sisters are settled. Ramu brings his family to Madras. Though Savitri is rich, she chooses a simple life like Ramu's, determined to save money for her sisters-in-law's marriages. Ramu, however, refuses to accept Savitri's salary, unwilling to depend on her income. Rangabashyam learns of Savitri's marriage. On Periyanayaki's advice, he meets Savitri and offers her money and jewelry for Ramu, but Savitri declines, knowing Ramu would never accept it.

Through his colleague Seshagopalan, Ramu meets Ramanujam, whose son Sekar is proposed as a groom for Shenbagam. Ramanujam demands that Ramu secure a job for Sekar in exchange for a dowry-free marriage. Ramu approaches his college friend for help, but discovers the man exploits women for sexual favors in return for employment. Periyanayaki threatens to expose him, forcing him to arrange a job for Sekar. However, once employed, Sekar refuses to marry Shenbagam, shocking his father. Overcome with guilt, Ramanujam emotionally compels Sekar to honor his promise, and the marriage takes place.

Malliga, Ramu's second sister, is influenced by their neighbor Anu, who persuades her to adopt a modern lifestyle and introduces her to glamorous dressing. At a pool, Malliga meets Santhosh and falls in love with him. Santhosh claims to be the son of a rich businessman, but in reality, his father, Palayathan, is a poor, illiterate butcher who blindly finances his son. Palayathan, after seeing Malliga and Santhosh together, considers arranging their marriage, but Santhosh dismisses Malliga as merely a friend and threatens suicide to stop his father's interference. Prakash returns from America as a reformed man who now wishes to lead a family life. Seeing this change, Periyanayaki proposes Prakash as a suitable match for Malliga, and Ramu arranges their marriage. However, Malliga elopes with Santhosh from the wedding hall, believing in his love. Palayathan follows them and discovers that Santhosh intends to sell Malliga into slavery. When Palayathan reveals the truth to Malliga, Santhosh attacks his father. Enraged by his son's cruelty, Palayathan kills Santhosh. He then safely returns Malliga to the wedding venue, where she marries Prakash as planned, and later surrenders to the police.

Ramu's youngest sister, Thamarai, is noticed by Kumar, who instantly falls in love and approaches Ramu for marriage. After enquiring, Periyanayaki declares Kumar a suitable match, stating that he is an orphan. On the wedding day, Kumar's parents appear unexpectedly, shocking everyone. They reveal themselves as former convicts who were imprisoned for murdering their first daughter-in-law over dowry demands—a case that Periyanayaki herself had exposed. Seeking revenge, they had sent Kumar to marry Thamarai. Ramu confronts Periyanayaki for failing to investigate properly. Though she pleads with Kumar's parents, they boast of having achieved their revenge. It is then revealed that Kumar is a genuinely good man who pretended to follow his parents' plan. Kumar publicly denounces his parents and, with police assistance, has them removed from the wedding venue. The marriage proceeds peacefully.

With all three sisters married and Ramu's responsibilities fulfilled, Rangabashyam and Periyanayaki hope that Ramu and Savitri will finally begin their married life. However, Shenbagam arrives with her husband Sekar in labor pains. Ramu and Savitri immediately rush to help her, once again placing family duty above personal happiness, reflecting the priority of relationships in Indian families.

== Cast ==
- Ramarajan as Ramu
- Madhuri as Savitri
- Lakshmi as Petition Periyanayaki
- Jaishankar as Rangabashyam, Savitri's father
- S. S. Chandran as Kumar's father
- Radha Ravi as Palayathan
- Delhi Ganesh as Ramanujam
- Senthil as a Manager
- Thyagu as Prakash
- S. N. Parvathy as Kumar's mother
- Omakuchi Narasimhan as Pitambaram, head clerk
- Typist Gopu as Sankaran, clerk
- Disco Shanti as Anu
- Achamillai Gopi as Kumar
- Thideer Kannaiah as an auto passenger
- Bayilvan Ranganathan as a Sub-inspector
- Vellai Subbaiah as a peon

== Soundtrack ==
The music was composed by Manoj–Gyan, with lyrics by Vaali.

Song	Singers
"Periyanayaki Pettishan..."	Malaysia Vasudevan
"Ammi Mithikkanum..."	Vani Jairam, Jayachandran
"Manjakkili Vanchikodi..."	Vani Jairam, S. N. Surendar
"Ivargal Indiyargal..."	Malaysia Vasudevan, B.S Sasirekha

== Reception ==
The Indian Express wrote the film "has inklings of idealism and that is its strong point". Jayamanmadhan of Kalki appreciated the film's songs and dialogues. Balumani of Anna praised acting, humour, dialogues, music and direction.
