= Ek Misaal =

- LP Vinyl Records Cover
- Directed by: Rajesh Varma
- Written by: Rajesh Varma (screenplay); Sukh Rani (story)
- Produced by: Vibha Bhatnagar
- Starring: Kanwaljit Singh; Kiran Juneja
- Music by: Manoj–Gyan
- Production company: C. S. K. Films
- Release date: 1986
- Running time: 135 minutes
- Country: India
- Language: Hindi

Ek Misaal is a 1986 Indian Hindi-language film directed by Rajesh Varma (a.k.a. Pammy Varma) for producer Vibha Bhatnagar, starring Kanwaljit Singh and Kiran Juneja. After years of working as the assistant director/second-unit director of Manmohan Desai, leading director of the 1970s, Rajesh Varma made his debut as the independent director of Ek Misaal.

== Plot ==
Despite a bright future, Rekha (Kiran Juneja) gives up her career when she marries Raj (Kanwaljit Singh), a wealthy playboy builder. Soon after words, Raj gets attracted to Bindu (Anjali Sen), throws Rekha out of his life and marries Bindu.

Distraught Rekha, with help from her brother Sagar, starts a business that competes with that of Raj. With her hard work and perseverance, this business does very well and grabs many of the building contracts that would have otherwise gone to Raj.

With the loss of these contracts, Raj's business begins to sink and ultimately goes bankrupt. Rekha then purchases all of Raj's business assets and without Raj's knowledge begins to support Pooja, Raj's daughter. Subsequently, Rekha leaves all of her wealth for Pooja.

In doing so, Rekha becomes a paragon/model of exceptional merit (Ek Missal) for women forsaken/abandoned by their spouses.

== Cast ==
- Kanwaljit Singh
- Kiran Juneja
- Anjali Sen as Bindu
- Arun Mathur
- Pravin Bhalla
- Abid Shah
- Jogesh Tiwari
- K.C. Srivastava

== Soundtrack ==
Music of the film was composed by the duo of Manoj–Gyan and the songs were penned by lyricists Asad Bhopali and Manoj.

#	Song	Singer
1	" Be Wafa Kahke Unko Bulaya"	Alka Yagnik
2	"Is Kadar Aadmi Ko Satati"	Mohammad Aziz
3	"Diljalo Ki Kahaniyan"	Alka Yagnik
4	"Main Nahin Makan Khayo "	Master Mayank Raj
5	" Diljalo Ki Kahaniyan-II"	Manhar Udhas
