= Illale Devata =

- VCD cover
- Directed by: Tatineni Prasad
- Written by: Satyanand (dialogues)
- Screenplay by: Tatineni Prasad
- Story by: Palagummi Padmaraju
- Produced by: N. R. Anuradha Devi
- Starring: Akkineni Nageswara Rao; Radhika; Bhanupriya
- Cinematography: S. Navakanth
- Edited by: Kotagiri Gopala Rao
- Music by: Chakravarthy
- Production company: Lakshmi Films Combines
- Release date: 1 May 1985
- Running time: 133 mins
- Country: India
- Language: Telugu

Illale Devata (transl. Wife is a Goddess) is a 1985 Telugu-language drama film directed by Tatineni Prasad. It stars Akkineni Nageswara Rao, Radhika, Bhanupriya and music composed by Chakravarthy. The film was produced by N. R. Anuradha Devi under the Lakshmi Films Combines banner. It is a remake of Singeetam Srinivasa Rao's debut Kannada film Haalu Jenu (1982).

== Cast ==
- Akkineni Nageswara Rao as Gopi Krishna
- Radhika as Lakshmi
- Bhanupriya as Radha
- Jaggayya as Dr. Rao
- Gollapudi Maruthi Rao as Bhupal Rao
- Prabhakar Reddy as Damodaram
- Allu Ramalingaiah as Vaddi Appala Raju
- Nutan Prasad as Kalyana Ramudu
- Nagesh as Manager
- Sarathi as Attorney Babu Rao
- Arun Kumar as Anand
- Telephone Satyanarayana as Dr. Varma
- Annapurna as Durgamma
- Anitha as Doctor
- Mamatha as Nurse
- Nirmalamma as Doddamma

== Crew ==
- Art: Bhaskara Raju
- Choreography: Prakash, Surekha
- Lyrics: Acharya Aatreya, Veturi
- Playback: S. P. Balasubrahmanyam, P. Susheela, S. P. Sailaja
- Dialogues: Satyanand
- Story: Palagummi Padmaraju
- Music: Chakravarthy
- Editing: Kotagiri Gopala Rao
- Cinematography: S. Navakanth
- Producer : N. R. Anuradha Devi
- Direction: Tatineni Prasad
- Banner: Lakshmi Films Combines
- Release Date: 1 May 1985

== Soundtrack ==
Illale Devata

Film score by Chakravarthy
- Released: 1985
- Genre: Soundtrack
- Length: 23:40
- Label: AVM Audio
- Producer: Chakravarthy

Chakravarthy chronology
Dampatyam (1985)	Illale Devata (1985)	Mugguru Mitrulu (1985)

Music was composed by Chakravarthy. Music released on AVM Audio Company.

S. No.	Song title	Lyrics	Singers	length
1	"Doragari Prema"	Veturi	S. P. Balasubrahmanyam, P. Susheela	4:18
2	"Ninnu Choosina Kallatho"	Veturi	S. P. Balasubrahmanyam, P. Susheela	4:19
3	"Rani Garu Maharani Garu"	Acharya Aatreya	S. P. Balasubrahmanyam, S. P. Sailaja	3:26
4	"Puvvulaga Navvukove"	Acharya Aatreya	S. P. Balasubrahmanyam	3:50
5	"Srivariki Kopalu"	Veturi	P. Susheela	4:06
6	"Palu Thene Kalayikala"	Acharya Aatreya	S. P. Balasubrahmanyam	3:41
