= Inaindha Kaigal =

1990 film by N. K. Viswanathan

- Poster
- Directed by: N. K. Viswanathan
- Written by: N. Prasannakumar (dialogues)
- Story by: Aabavanan
- Produced by: Aabavanan
- Starring: Ramki; Arun Pandian; Nirosha; Sindhu
- Cinematography: N. K. Viswanathan
- Edited by: S. Ashok Mehtha
- Music by: Gyan Varma
- Production company: Thiraichirpi
- Release date: 2 August 1990
- Running time: 160 minutes
- Country: India
- Language: Tamil

Inaindha Kaigal (transl. Conjoined Hands) is a 1990 Indian Tamil-language action film directed by N. K. Viswanathan. It stars Ramki, Arun Pandian, Nirosha and Sindhu, with Nassar, Senthil, Srividya, Murali Kumar and Prabhakaran playing supporting roles. The film, produced by Aabavanan who also wrote the story and lyrics, was released on 2 August 1990.

== Plot ==
An Indian Military man named Ashok reaches Chennai but is soon chased down by thugs. He gets stabbed and stumbles into a church where he is discovered by Julie (Nirosha), an orphan and is admitted to the hospital. There, two men disguised as doctors kill him and before dying, Ashok scribbles IC181 on the lamp. Army Doctor Chandralekha (Srividya), who is in military house arrest for being a traitor, visits him and finds the note. Her lawyer identifies the number as a service number of an ex-military man named David. David and Ashok apparently worked in a secret mission involving the infiltration of an enemy prison base, and was successful, but due to the mass casualty of their team, the team was disbanded and David had reportedly quit service. Co-incidentally, David and Julie are lovers. David meets Chandralekha secretly and is informed by her that Ashok was released from the military prison, and had seen her son Gunasekaran who is imprisoned there on false charges. Chandralekha requests David to rescue her son, which he agrees. He takes up the mission more out of patriotism and leaves for it.

At the same time, the hideous criminal P. K. Roy appoints a clever, cunning and industrious criminal Pratap to bring the same Gunasekharan from prison. Both leave for their missions respectively often trying to out-do each other. Pratap falls in love with a girl while he is on mission. Julie to happens to be there for a social service program with her friends, but leave the social service program after finding out she is pregnant. She catches glimpse of David, who rescues her from gangsters and fails to recognise her, but Julie is unable to reunite with him. With the help of caretaker, Julie reaches Chennai.

Both Prathap and David cross path on their mission, and when Pratap's life is in danger, David risks his own to save him and they join hands (hence the title) agree to work together considering the level of danger in the mission. They agree to rescue Gunasekaran together and then figure out who will get to bring him back home. An intense scene is shown where with prior knowledge of David and the skills of Prathap, the men rescue Gunasekaran and bring him to safety. While arguing who gets to bring back Gunasekaran, the latter tells what happened and why he was imprisoned on false accusations.

Gunasekaran is a photographer who has the privilege to take rare scenery shots at the military camps as his mother is a military doctor. At one point, while taking photograph, he encounters P.K. Roy, who supplies medicine to the Indian Army. Unknown to anyone, PK Roy supplies sub-standard medicines. At one point, while Gunasekaran is talking photograph, he sees a helicopter blast in mid-air and photographs it. PK Roy was in the helicopter and he is admitted to the military clinic and is treated by Chandralekha, and eventually loses his leg. While there, Gunasekaran comes and tells his mother of the crash and says he is going to look for the black-box. PK Roy overhears this and leaves the camp without notice. Gunasekaran eventually takes the black-box and buries it safely before getting captured by the enemy military for crossing the border and is imprisoned. Chandralekha is also blacklisted for the sub-standard medicines and is arrested.

David and Prathap realised the truth and Prathap vows to protect Gunasekaran and hand him to Chandralekha. While David and Prathap are wanted by the police, Julie's pregnancy progresses. She is eventually treated by Chandralekha, but David is only able to hear her voice and learns he is going to be a father, but is unable to talk to her. He boards the train and Chandralekha is also unable to talk to him, and thus, David fails to pass the message of Julie's identity and his relationship.

As they return to Chennai, PK Roy arrives at the Central station too, intending to kill Prathap and Gunasekaran and retrieve the black-box. A fight ensues, and David is wounded. Prathap informs PK Roy of his personal vengeance as the pilot killed in the crash is actually his father. PK Roy eventually dies, after Prathap chains his wheelchair to a train which is leaving the station, and PK Roy is dragged backwards and hanged from the bridge.

Julie dies giving birth to a son, and even before David and Julie could barely hold hands, both die. Prathap takes the child and gives it to his girlfriend and tells her to take care of him till he gets released as now they will be the parents to the child of David and Julie

== Cast ==
- Ramki as Pratap
- Arun Pandian as Maj. David Kumar
- Nirosha as Julie
- Sindhu as Geetha
- Srividya as Lt. Col. Chandralekha
- Nassar as P. K. Roy
- Senthil as Mani
- A. R. S. as Lawyer Shanmugam
- Prabhakaran as Gunasekaran
- Murali Kumar as Ashok
- Vellai Subbaiah as Sivaraman
- K. S. Selvaraj
- Vijay Ganesh as P. K. Roy's assistant
- Charle as a singer (guest appearance)
- Veera Raghavan in a guest appearance
- Kullamani in a guest appearance as a hired-to-kill assassin targeting Pratap

== Production ==
Art director GK revealed that, to show snow covered lake, the team went to Ooty. Since there was no snow, they emptied a load of salt in the place to make it look like snow and shot the scene. This was the debut film of Sindhu.

== Soundtrack ==
The music was composed by Gyan Varma, with lyrics written by Aabavanan.

| Song | Singer(s) | Length |
|---|---|---|
| "Aadi Maasam" | Gangai Amaran | 2:23 |
| "Andhinera Thendral" | S. P. Balasubrahmanyam, Jayachandran | 4:29 |
| "Chinnapoove Chinnapoove" | Deepan Chakravarthy, Vidhya | 4:31 |
| "Gangai Karaiyil" | Malaysia Vasudevan | 4:59 |
| "Malaiyorum Kuyil" | Deepan Chakravarthy, Vidhya | 4:28 |
| "Oracha Manjala" | Abhavanan | 2:48 |
| "Mella Mella" | Vidhya | 3:06 |
| "Ithu Enna Mudhalirava" | S. P. Balasubrahmanyam, B. S. Sasirekha | 3:47 |

== Reception ==
The Indian Express called it "ambitious and vast, brash, blatantly loud, empty and diffuse". A group of people reviewed the film for Kalki, praising the fight sequence and locations but felt there were too many songs.

== Legacy ==
The film had an extraordinary opening and such that it created stampedes in Shanti theatre in Coimbatore, killing two persons. This led to the theatre's licence being cancelled until the theatre owner "toiled" to regain it. In the 2013 Tamil film Sutta Kadhai, the lead heroes of that film Balaji and Venkatesh appear as fans of Ramki and Arun Pandian. In one scene, Balaji utters the film's title referring to their collaboration on a mission.
