= Kaviya Thalaivan (1992 film) =

1992 film by K. S. Gopalakrishnan

- Poster
- Directed by: K. S. Gopalakrishnan
- Screenplay by: Aabavanan; K. S. Gopalakrishnan
- Story by: Aabavanan
- Produced by: Aabavanan
- Starring: Vijayakanth; Bhanupriya
- Cinematography: N. K. Viswanathan
- Edited by: K. Govindasamy
- Music by: Aravind Siddhartha
- Production company: Tamil Ponni Art
- Release date: 25 October 1992
- Running time: 170 minutes
- Country: India
- Language: Tamil

Kaviya Thalaivan (transl. Epic Hero) is a 1992 Indian Tamil-language drama film directed and co-written by K. S. Gopalakrishnan. The film stars Vijayakanth and Bhanupriya. It was released on 25 October 1992, Diwali day.

== Plot ==
Priya and Saradha are twins. Priya is a spoiled brat, while Saratha is very traditional and calm-natured. Their mother Subha is a party lover and spends all their money on her luxury life. She married their father for his wealth, but the twins' grandfather Damodaran, an industrialist, declines to give a single penny to Subha after his son's death because of her nature. Priya grows up with Damodaran, and Saradha is with Subha in Singapore. Saradha longs for her grandfather and the life in India, while Priya despises it.

Manikkam is a good-natured man who goes to jail for the crime committed by his friend Chandru. Upon release, he travels in a ship back to India. Damodaran and Priya travel in the same ship after winning a court battle with Subha on their wealth. Manikkam saves Damodaran from Subha's goons. Damodaran hires Manikkam as a manager in his factory. Priya hates Manikkam right from the start and makes several attempts to kick him out. She accuses him of trying to rape her on her birthday, and Damodharan uses this as a chance to get them married, believing only Mannikkam can love and put up with her behaviour. She continues to hate him, but she changes her behaviour when she learns about her grandfather's will. She cannot spend a penny from his wealth if she doesn't lead a family life with Manikkam, and she will be eligible to become the owner of his properties only if she becomes a mother. She tries to get pregnant but with no success. Her friends criticise her for not becoming a mother and they go to a doctor for treatment. The doctor reveals to Manikkam that his wife is sterile, and Manikkam decides to take the blame as Priya will be broken if she knew the truth.

Priya asks for the divorce, but Manikkam disagrees. she treats him with disrespect and runs off to Singapore. Saradha advises her to go back, but she challenges her to take her place for a month and then she will agree with her. Saradha uses this chance and travels to Chennai to be with her grandfather. Manikkam showers her with love, and she struggles to maintain distance. She almost ends up in his bed and somehow manages to fall herself from stairs to keep him at distance. They decide to go on a leisure trip where she drinks a drug unknowingly, and end up in Manikkam's bed. She decides to kill herself but she is stopped by Damodaran, who knew from first that she is Saradha. Damodaran plays a drama and gets Saradha and Manikkam married. Saradha gets pregnant and travels to Singapore for delivery.

Meanwhile, Subha is in debt. The rich businessman Pradeep is attracted to Priya and wants her in his bed. Subha sees this as a way to pay her debts and agrees to send Priya to him for an exchange of 10 lakh rupees. Priya has frequent stomach pain and collapses while escaping from Pradeep. At the hospital, she finds out that she has uterine cancer and is sterile. She sees a very pregnant Saradha in the same hospital and realises the truth, that Manikkam was not sterile. Saratha learns of her sister being admitted to the same hospital, and she leaves the newborn with sleeping Priya and leaves the hospital but was kidnapped by Pradeep's men. Manikkam follows them and rescues Saradha.

At home Priya confronts Saradha, and a shocked Manikkam says he only loves Priya and not Saradha, and that he doesn't care if Priya hates him. Priya apologises to him and dies in his feet by uniting him and Saradha.

== Cast ==
- Vijayakanth as Manikkam
- Bhanupriya as Saradha / Priya
- M. N. Nambiar as Damodaran
- Manorama as Vellaiamma
- Manjula Vijayakumar as Subha
- Chandrasekhar as Chandru (Guest appearance)
- Nassar as Pradeep (Guest appearance)
- Charle (Guest appearance)
- C. R. Saraswathi as Priya's friend
- Jayakala
- Usha Priya
- A. R. Srinivasan as a doctor
- Neelu as Ranga Bashyam
- Singapore Manimaaran
- Mottai Seetharaman

== Soundtrack ==
The music was composed by Aravind Siddhartha, with lyrics written by Aabavanan.

Song	Singer(s)	Duration
"Aadivarum Kottai"	Swarnalatha	4:50
"Kana Kanum Neram"	S. P. Balasubrahmanyam	5:02
"Oru Murai"	S. P. Balasubrahmanyam	5:12
"Sandhana Malargalai"	K. J. Yesudas, Swarnalatha, Manorama	4:57
"Vannakili Vanna"	K. J. Yesudas	4:45

== Release and reception ==
Kaviya Thalaivan was released on 25 October 1992, Diwali day. Malini Mannath of The Indian Express wrote that with the collaboration of Gopalakrishnan and Aabavanan, "the result has been disastrous. [..] There is none of the finesse of producer's earlier films or the sentiment value and strong screenplay of the director's earlier ventures." K. Vijiyan of New Straits Times wrote, "This is a family movie which all married couples will take great pleasure in watching". Maaya Krishnan of Kalki called Nambiar's performance as the film's only saving grace, but concluded that anyone who has patience enough to watch this film is a "Kaaviya Thalaivan".
