= Mutrugai =

- Title card
- Directed by: Manobala
- Written by: Aabavanan; R. P. Viswam (dialogues)
- Produced by: G. M. Varalakshmi; Mohan Rao
- Starring: Arun Pandian; Bhanupriya; Ranjitha; Geetha
- Cinematography: S. Jayachandran
- Edited by: K. R. Gowri Shankar
- Music by: Siddhartha
- Production company: Sri Varalakshmi Cine Productions
- Release date: 14 January 1993
- Running time: 145 minutes
- Country: India
- Language: Tamil

Mutrugai (transl. Siege) is a 1993 Indian Tamil-language action thriller film, directed by Manobala. The film stars Arun Pandian, Bhanupriya, Ranjitha and Geetha. It was released on 14 January 1993. The film was remade in Hindi as Janta Ki Adalat.

== Plot ==
The story begins with the escape of the convict Balakrishnan, who was blamed for burning 16 persons alive in the past. The minister Maasilamani wants absolutely to kill him, while the DSP Bhavani wants to catch him. During a village festival, Bala tries to kill Maasilamani, but he fails. So Bala turns back to his village wherein the villagers support him and try to protect him. Meanwhile, the police surround the village to catch the culprit. Only Saradha reveals the truth to Bhavani.

In the past, Bala was a government engineer transferred to Maasilamani's village. Bala and the village belle Gowri fell in love with each other. The problems started when Maasilamani wanted to build a factory right in the middle of the village stream, the villagers opposed the project and Bala refused to accept it. Later, Bala was forced to leave the village and got a transfer to the Chennai office. Maasilamani started to build a foreign factory with his Benami Pandurangam. The consequences for the villagers led to uncomfortable living conditions: the land became dry because of the lack of water and the farmers suffered from famine. When the villagers decided to leave the village, Bala encouraged them to stay there and they all destroyed the factory. Maasilamani not being able to do anything waited for the right moment to get revenge on Bala. Maasilamani was secretly married to Saradha, she was pregnant and Maasilamani wanted to remarry her in front of the villagers. In fact, Maasilamani conspired a master plan. During the village festival, Maasilamani blamed Bala of having an affair with Saradha. Bala was beaten by the villagers. A few hours later, Gowri and Saradha proved that the statement was wrong to the villagers heads and that time Maasilamani's henchmen set the house on fire. 16 persons died including Bala's lover Gowri, Saradha was the only one to survive. The police then arrested the innocent Bala.

Bala is now determined to kill the heartless Maasilamani. What happens next forms the crux of the story.

== Cast ==
- Arun Pandian as Balakrishnan alias Bala
- Bhanupriya as DSP Bhavani
- Ranjitha as Gowri
- Geetha as Saratha
- R. P. Viswam as Maasilamani
- Vennira Aadai Moorthy
- Gandhimathi
- Charle as Mani
- Pandu as Pandurangam
- Vijaya Krishnaraj as Collector
- Sethu Vinayagam as DIG
- N. S. Ravi Shankar
- Samikannu
- S. K. Balakrishnan
- Idichapuli Selvaraj as Vadivelu
- Pasi Narayanan as Sivasubramaniam
- Sivaraman as Naadimuthu
- Kallukkul Eeram Ramanathan
- Karuppu Subbiah
- Periya Karuppu Thevar
- Vellai Subbaiah
- Sakthivel as Sub-Inspector Ramarajan
- Neelu as Venkatraman

== Soundtrack ==
The music was composed by Siddhartha, with lyrics written by Aabavanan.

Song	Singer	Duration
"Aathu Kulla"	Malaysia Vasudevan	4:50
"Parisam Poda Varalama"	Mano, Swarnalatha	5:00
"Kezhavi"	Kovai Kamala	4:34
"Kannimayil" (I)	Malaysia Vasudevan	0:54
"Kannimayil" (II)	Malaysia Vasudevan, B. S. Sasirekha	1:35
"Aarum Illai Neerum Illai"	B. S. Sasirekha	0:42
"Oorana"	Kovai Kamala	2:08

== Critical reception ==
Malini Mannath of The Indian Express labelled the film an "average entertainer". C. R. K. of Kalki wrote that the film had a story that goes without losing track, adding that the climax was tension-filled, and the siege strong.
