= Mani Prasad =

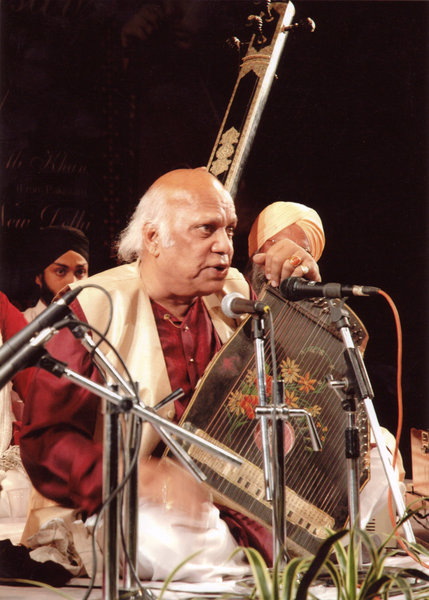
Mani Prasad Mani Prasad
- Birth name: Mani Prasad
- Born: November 4, 1932
- Origin: Wardha, Maharashtra, India
- Died: January 13, 2023 (aged 90)
- Genres: Indian classical music
- Years active: 1935 - 2023

Pandit Mani Prasad (4 November 1932 - 13 January 2023) was an Indian classical vocalist from the Kirana gharana (singing style).

== Early life and training ==
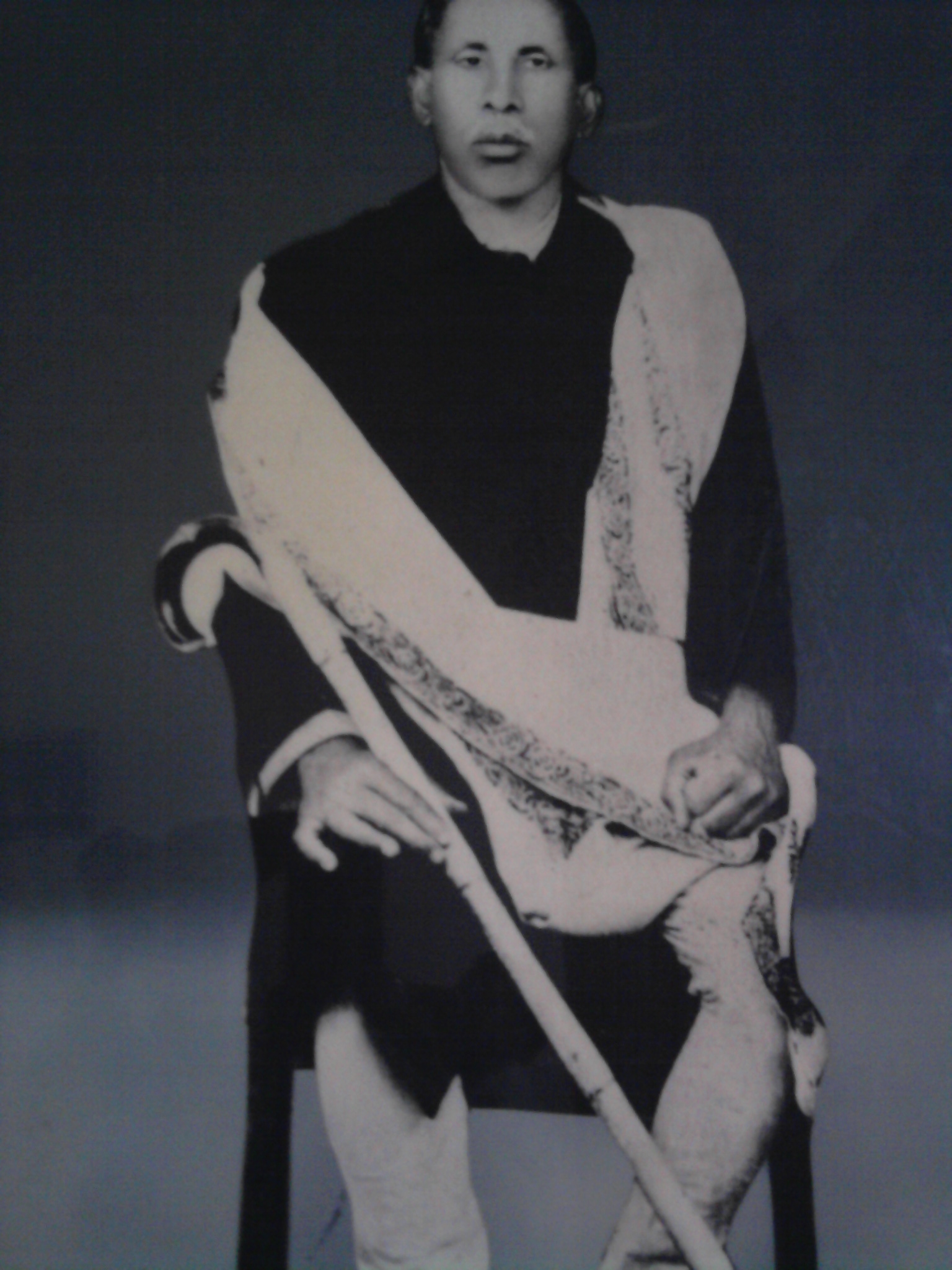
Mani's father Sukhdev Prasad

Mani Prasad was born into a family of musicians. His father, Sukhdev Prasad, had received music training from Abdul Karim Khan and Abdul Wahid Khan, the founders of the Kirana gharana.

Mani Prasad accompanied his father on all his tours and performances across the country from an early age. He moved from Wardha in Maharashtra to New Delhi in his youth along with his father. He was trained mostly by his father but was also guided by his grandfather Pandit Shakti Lal and by his uncles Pandit Shankar Lal and Pandit Gopal Prasad.

== Musical career ==
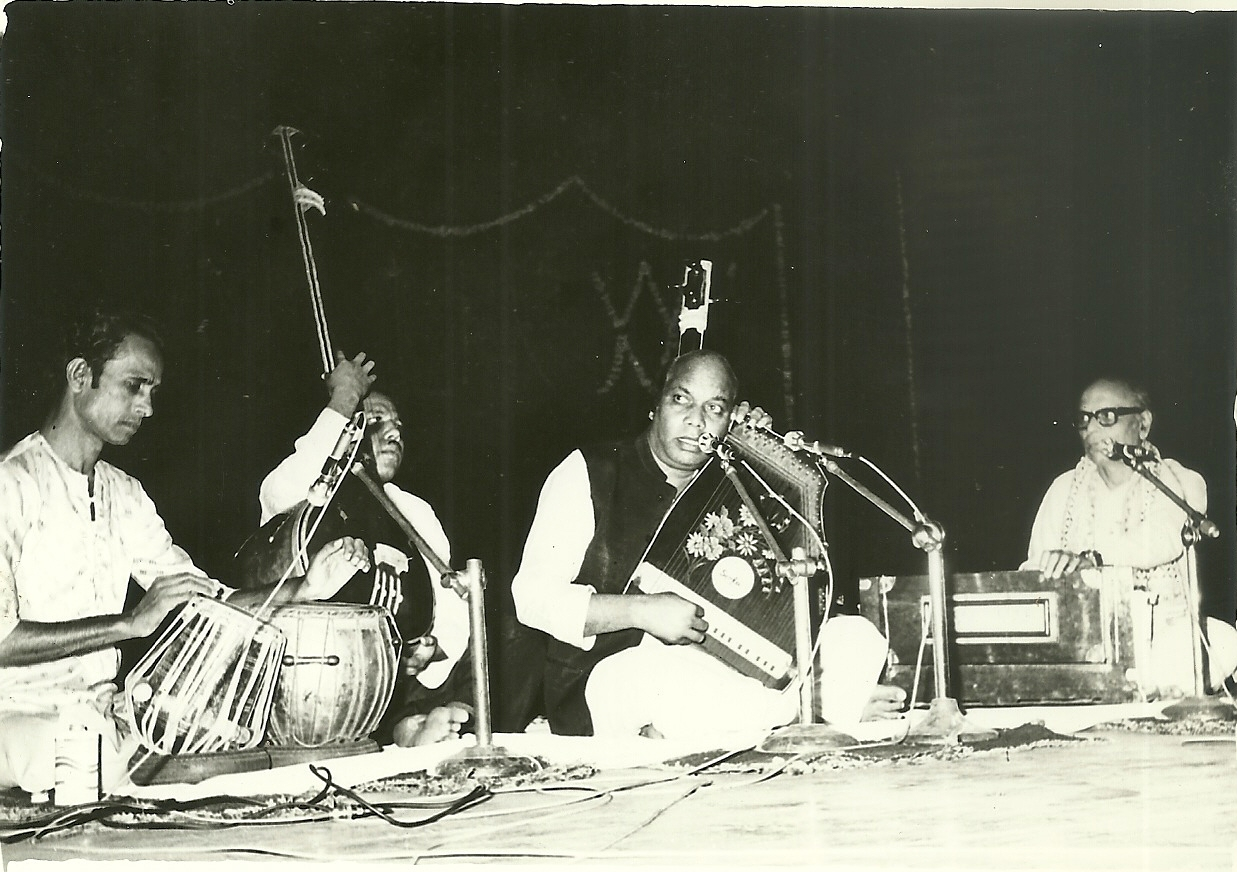
Mani Prasad performing

Pandit Mani Prasad started his career early, being brought up in a musical family. He is ranked as a Top Grade 'A class' artist by the All India Radio and is a well recognised television artist with the Doordarshan.

He has not only created some new ragas but also composed many bandishes in existing ragas with the mudra Dhyan Rang Piya. The new ragas include Dhyan Kalyan, Dhyani Todi, Shivkauns and Bhoopeshwari.

Among his students are Maharaja Ranjitsinh Pratapsinh Gaekwad of Baroda, Savita Devi Maharaj (daughter of thumri singer Siddheshwari Devi), Rita Ganguly, Ramesh Jule, Ravi Jule, Pt. Vishwanath, Uma Garg, Surinder Kaur, and Chandan Dass.

In recent years, he served as the Guru at the Dr. Gangubai Hangal Gurukul in Hubli, Karnataka where he was invited by the Government of Karnataka.

== Discography ==
- Pt. Mani Prasad, A Concert Series by Swarashree Enterprises, CBS
- Pt. Mani Prasad, MIDAS
- Pt. Mani Prasad, Swaranjali
- Dhyan Rang Piya, MIDAS
- Love Bandish Bliss, Times Music

== Honours and awards ==
- Sangeet Natak Akademi Award in 2019
- Rajasthan Sangeet Natak Akademi Award
- Swarmani Award
- Raseshwar Award given by Sur Singar Samsad of Mumbai
- Baba Allaudin Khan Award
- Srimati Gangubai Hangal Award
- Ustad Faiyyaz Khan - Ustad Niaz Khan Memorial Award
- Swar Sadhana Ratna
- Sangeet Martand Samman
- Sangeet Kala Ratna
- Felicitation by Raagranjini
- Pandit mallikarjun award

== Gallery ==
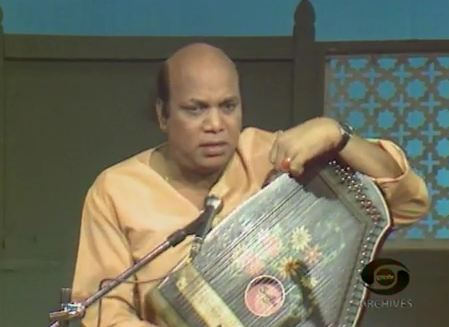

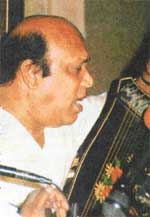

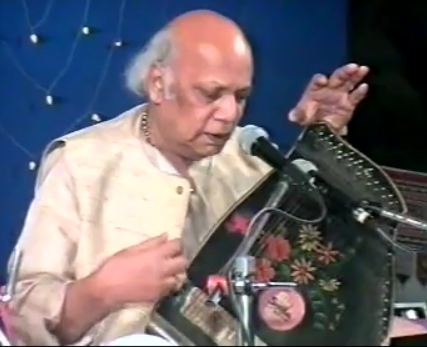

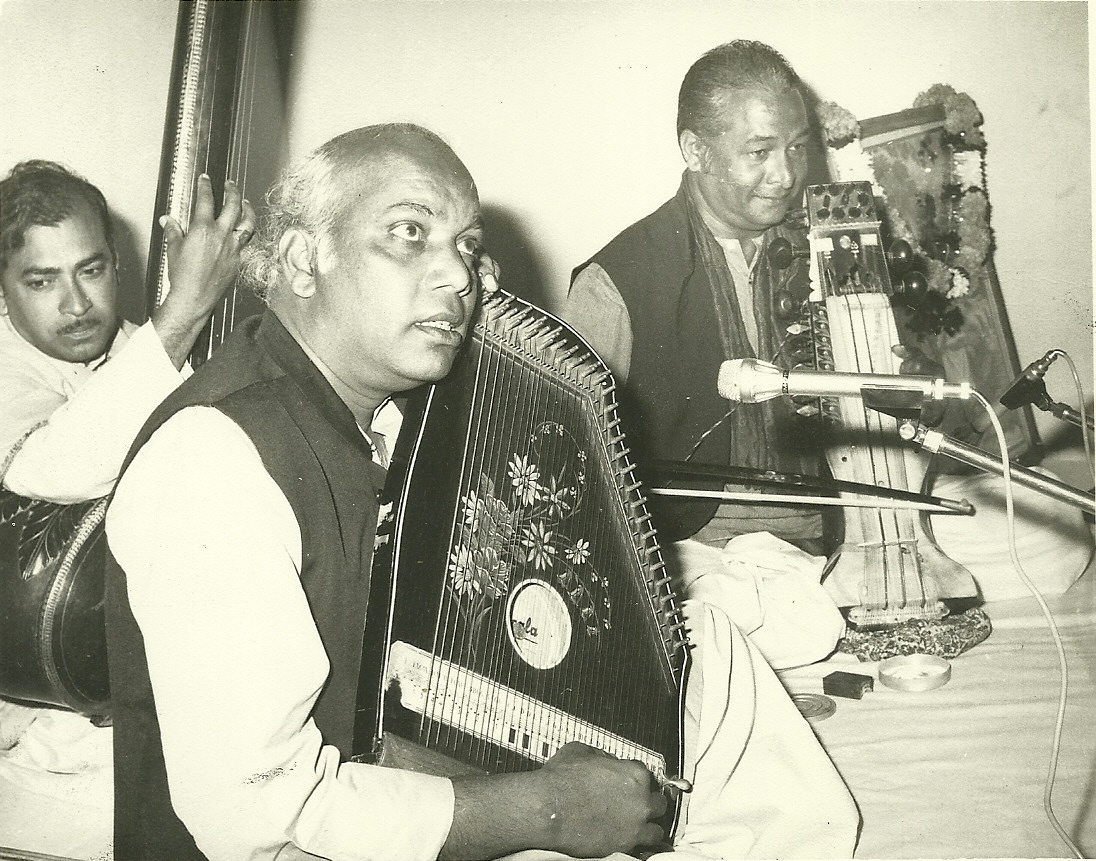

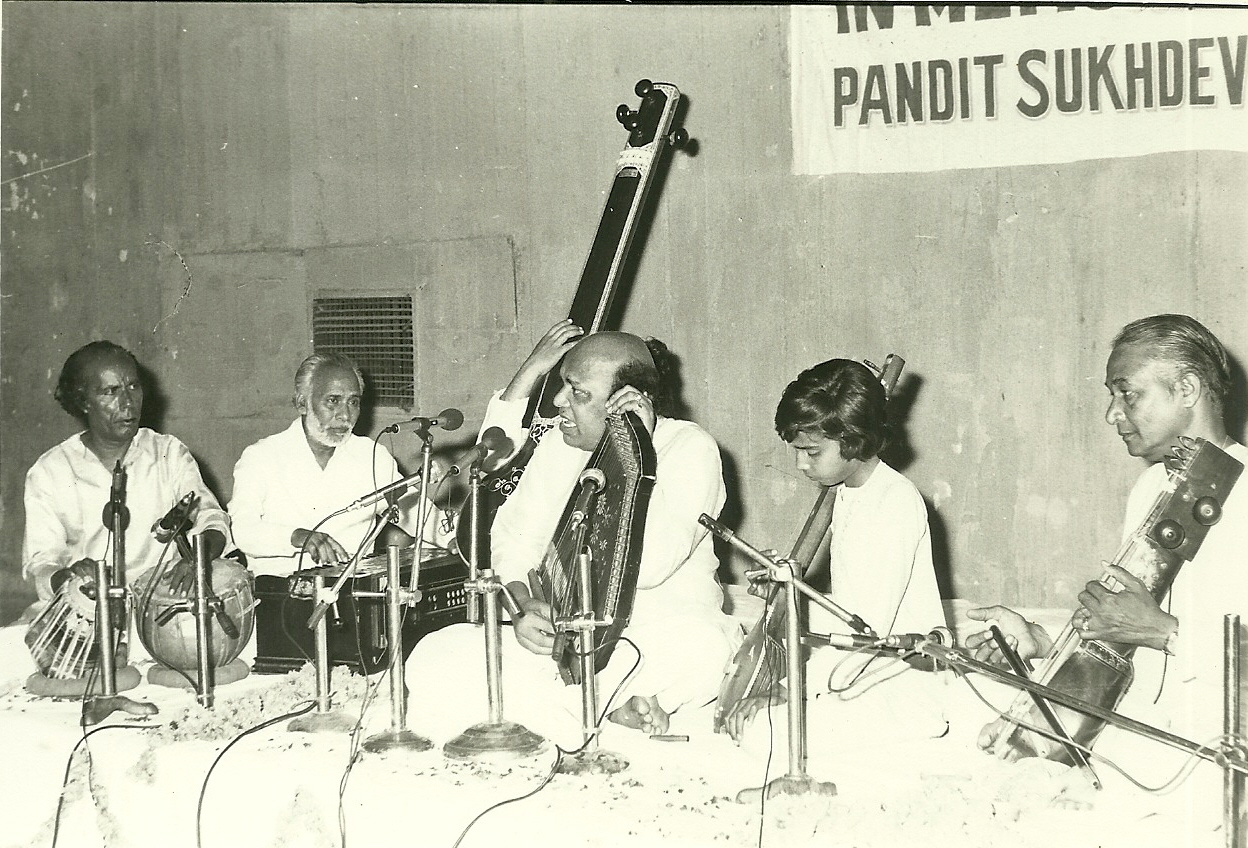

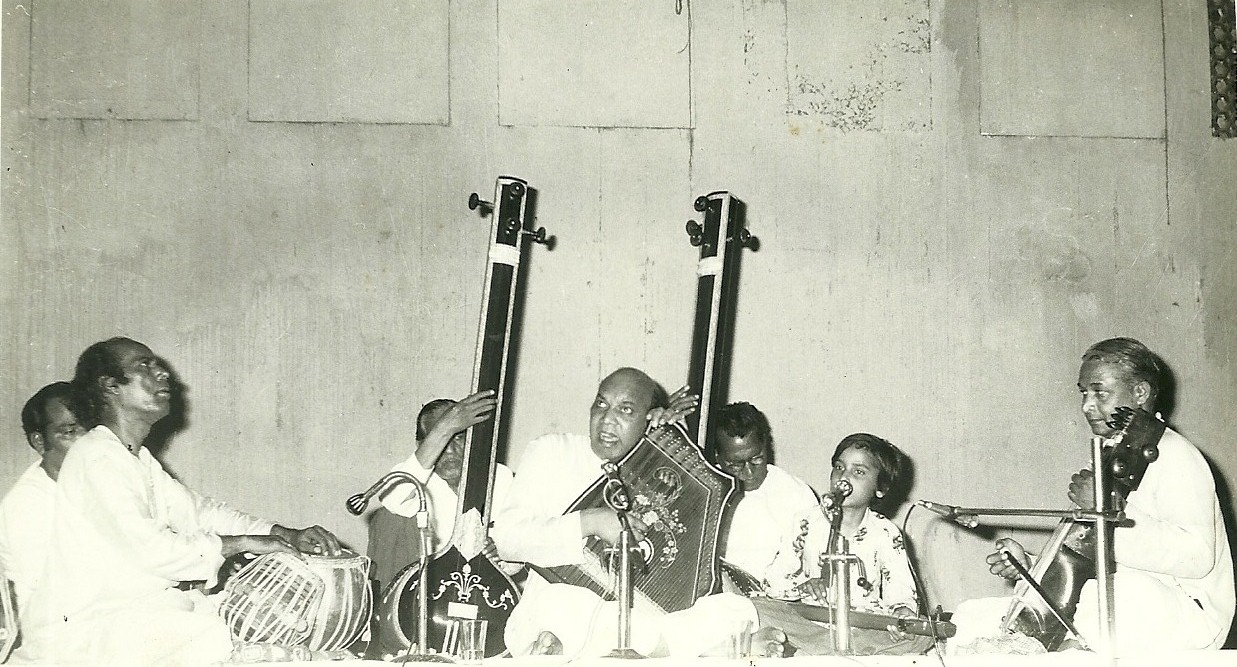

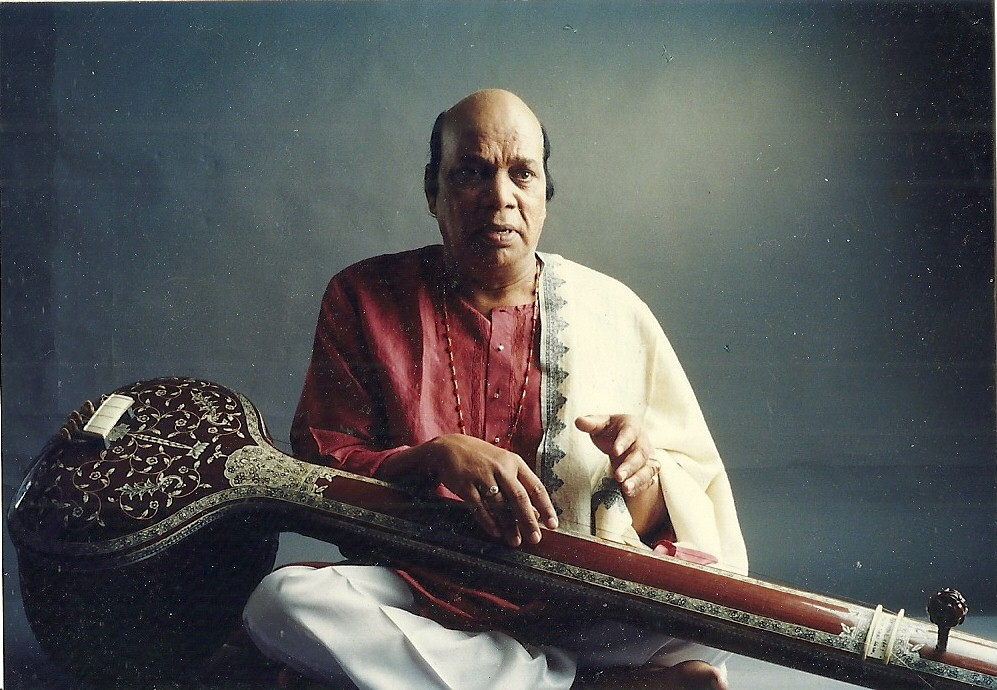

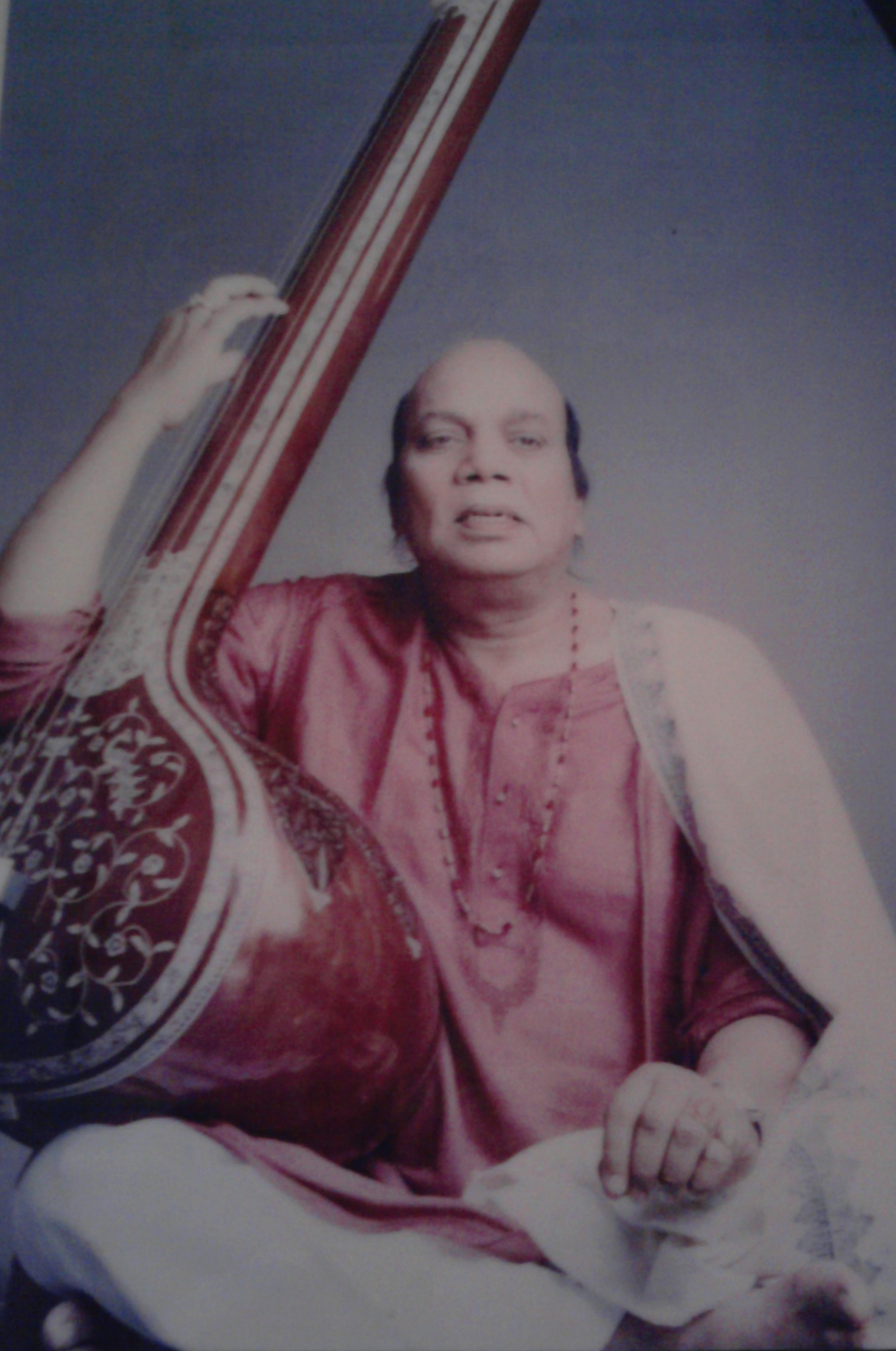

== Personal life ==
Pandit Mani Prasad died on 13 January 2023 in Mumbai.
