= Megam Karuththirukku =

- Poster
- Directed by: Rama Narayanan
- Written by: Rama Narayanan
- Produced by: Raja Manickam; Rama Subbaiah
- Starring: Prabhu; Rekha
- Cinematography: N. K. Viswanathan
- Edited by: Rajkeerthi
- Music by: Manoj–Gyan
- Production company: Ravi Prasad Pictures
- Release date: 6 March 1987
- Country: India
- Language: Tamil

Megam Karuththirukku (transl. The sky has darkened) is a 1987 Indian Tamil-language drama film directed by Rama Narayanan, starring Prabhu and Rekha. It was released on 6 March 1987.

== Cast ==
- Prabhu as Karuppu Devan
- Rekha as Chithra
- Raghuvaran
- Senthil
- Madhuri
- Charle
- Vennira Aadai Moorthy
- Kallapetti Singaram
- S. S. Chandran
- Usilai Mani
- Kovai Sarala

== Soundtrack ==
The music was composed by Manoj–Gyan and lyrics were written by Vairamuthu. The song "Azhagana Pullimaane" became popular.

Track listing
No.	Title	Singer(s)	Length
1.	"Ding Dong"	K. S. Chithra	4:17
2.	"Adiyamma Rakkayi"	K. S. Chithra	4:29
3.	"Vadukapatti Ayyadurai"	Malaysia Vasudevan	4:42
4.	"Azagana Puli Mane"	K. J. Yesudas	5:01
5.	"Karuppa Adu"	K. S. Chithra	3:57
Total length:			22:26

== Reception ==
The Indian Express said the film "provides routine entertainment. It is passable fare".
