= Nilave Malare =

- Theatrical release poster
- Directed by: S. A. Chandrasekhar
- Screenplay by: S. A. Chandrasekhar
- Story by: Shoba Chandrasekhar
- Produced by: Sajan
- Starring: Nadhiya; Rahman; Baby Shalini
- Cinematography: M. Kesavan
- Edited by: D. Shyam Mukherjee
- Music by: M. S. Viswanathan
- Production company: Saj Productions
- Release date: 14 February 1986
- Running time: 134 minutes
- Country: India
- Language: Tamil

Nilave Malare (transl. Oh Moon, Oh Flower) is a 1986 Indian Tamil-language drama film directed by S. A. Chandrasekhar. The film stars Rahman, Nadhiya, Baby Shalini and Manorama. It was released on 14 February 1986. The film was later dubbed into Telugu as Muddula Papa.

== Cast ==
- Rahman as Vijay
- Nadhiya as Janaki and Sheela
- Baby Shalini as Priya
- Manorama
- Senthil
- Rajesh as Raghu
- S. A. Chandrasekhar as Doctor
- M. N. Rajam as Raghu's aunt

== Production ==
The song "Oru Diamond Rani" was shot in a set resembling cards at Murugalaya Studios.

== Soundtrack ==
Tamil version

The music was composed by M. S. Viswanathan.

Song	Singers	Lyrics
"Mannil Vandha"	P. Susheela	Pulamaipithan
"Malai Ponnana"	K. J. Yesudas, Vani Jayaram	Kuruvikkarambai Shanmugam
"Sondhangalai"	S. P. Balasubrahmanyam	Vaali
"Oru Dimon Rani"	S. N. Surender	Vaali
"Pottiku Potti"	Malaysia Vasudevan, SN Surender	Pulamaipithan
"Ammavum Appavum Illai"	S. Janaki	Muthulingam
"Sudhandira naattu"	P. Susheela, Malaysia Vasudevan	Muthulingam

Malayalam version

The music was composed by M. S. Viswanathan and lyrics were written by Poovachal Khader.

Song	Singers
"Amma Achanu"	S. Janaki, Chorus
"Maane Pon Varnna"	K. J. Yesudas, K. S. Chithra
"Mannin Vennilaave"	P. Susheela
"Mannin Vennilaave"	K. S. Chithra
"Mannin Vennilaave" (Pathos)	P. Susheela
"Oru Diamond Rani"	Chorus, Krishnachandran
"Porinu Poru"	Krishnachandran
"Swanthangale"	K. J. Yesudas
"Swanthangale" (Pathos)	K. J. Yesudas
"Swathanthrarayulla"	K. J. Yesudas, K. S. Chithra

== Reception ==
Jayamanmadhan of Kalki wrote Chandrasekhar, who was arguing about court, murder and law, suddenly changed his track to family and love, which is to be welcomed and also appreciated the performances of Rahman, Baby Shalini and Viswanathan's music. At the 7th Cinema Express Awards, Shalini won the award for Best Child Artist. Balumani of Anna praised acting, music and direction and called it a must watch for family audience.
