= Endrendrum Kadhal =

- Poster
- Directed by: Manoj Bhatnagar
- Written by: Crazy Mohan (dialogues)
- Screenplay by: Manoj Bhatnagar
- Story by: Manoj Bhatnagar
- Produced by: K. T. Kunjumon; Manoj Bhatnagar
- Starring: Vijay; Rambha; Bhanupriya
- Cinematography: K. S. Shiva
- Edited by: B. S.Vasu – Saleem
- Music by: Manoj Bhatnagar
- Production company: Sameera Films
- Distributed by: Gentleman Film International
- Release date: 5 March 1999
- Running time: 150 minutes
- Country: India
- Language: Tamil

Endrendrum Kadhal (transl. Forever Love) (Note: Spelt on the CBFC certificate and title card as Enrendrum Kaadal.) is a 1999 Indian Tamil-language romantic drama film written, directed, co-produced, and music composed by Manoj Bhatnagar (in his directorial debut). The film stars Vijay, Rambha, and Bhanupriya in the lead roles, with Raghuvaran, Nizhalgal Ravi, Radha Ravi, Charle, and Dhamu in other pivotal roles. Veteran actor M. N. Nambiar also played a supporting role. The film was released on 5 March 1999.

== Plot ==
Vijay is the managing director of a large shipping corporation. He lives in a joint family with his father Sethupathi, two brothers Krishna and Vasu, their wives and children, and a spinster sister Pooja. Vijay goes to Switzerland in Europe to stipulate a contract with Nagaraj and Shekar. There, he meets Meenakshi, Nagaraj's sister. The two of them fall in love. Nagaraj approves of Vijay, but when he expresses the condition that Vijay should stay with them after the marriage because India is not good, he refuses his offer and returns home. However, Shekar and Meenu later travel to India to mend fences. Shekar learns that Pooja had been dumped by Nagaraj for a better life, and Vijay is just waiting for an opportunity to kill the man who destroyed his sister's life. He devises ways of preventing Nagaraj from attending the marriage, but he later tells Pooja the truth. Vijay overhears this and is angered, but Shekar solves all the problems by deciding to marry Pooja. Pooja agrees for this too, making everyone happy. Finally, Vijay, seeing his sister happy leaves Nagaraj alone. Eventually, Meenu and Vijay get married.

== Cast ==
- Vijay as Vijay
- Rambha as Meenakshi alias Meenu
- Bhanupriya as Pooja
- Raghuvaran as Shekar
- M. N. Nambiar as Sethupathi
- Radha Ravi as Krishna
- Nizhalgal Ravi as Nagaraj, Meenu's brother
- Charle as Sabapathi
- Dhamu as Vasu
- Anju as Uma, Krishna's wife
- Sindhu as Girija, Vasu's wife
- Vishali Kannadasan as a television interviewer
- S. A. Rajkumar as a singer (special appearance)

== Production ==
The film marked the directorial debut of Manoj Bhatnagar who earlier worked as music composer alongside Gyan as Manoj–Gyan. He financed the film from the profits he made after building a dubbing studio Sameera. The film marked a comeback for actress Bhanupriya, who was signed on for the film in November 1998, after she had relocated base to the United States. Meena was initially approached for the film, but had to turn the offer down due to her busy schedule and Rambha was selected as heroine.

== Soundtrack ==
The music was composed by Manoj Bhatnagar and released by Pyramid.

Track listing
No.	Title	Lyrics	Singer(s)	Length
1.	"O Thendrale"	Palani Bharathi	S. P. Balasubrahmanyam, Anuradha Sriram	4:57
2.	"Kangala Minnala"	Palani Bharathi	S. P. Balasubrahmanyam, K. S. Chithra	5:05
3.	"Ulagellam"	Vairamuthu	Hariharan	5:07
4.	"Nadodi Nanba"	Arivumathi	Nagore E. M. Hanifa, P. Unnikrishnan, K. S. Chithra	5:22
5.	"Jalakku"	Ponnyin Selvan	Sujatha Mohan, Devie Neithiyar, S. N. Surendar, K. Prabhakar	5:20
6.	"Take It Easy"	Piraisoodan	Anuradha Sriram	5:46
Total length:				31:37

== Reception ==
D. S. Ramanujam of The Hindu wrote, "An ordinary love story has been made fairly entertaining in Sameera Films' "Endrendrum Kaathal". The lead pair Vijay and Ramba have a major say in it — the former makes good use of the openings given in the dialogues of "Crazy" Mohan, while the latter is her glamorous self". Ramanujam also appreciated the cinematography by Shiva. Ananda Vikatan rated the film 34 out of 100.
