= Manoj–Gyan =

Indian music composer duo

- Genres: Film score, Fusion music
- Occupations: Composer, music director, orchestrator, conductor

Manoj–Gyan was an Indian musical duo consisting of composers Manoj Bhatnagar and Gyan Varma. In the 1980s, the two collaboratively composed music for Tamil and Hindi-language films. Manoj hails from the state of Uttar Pradesh, while Gyan is from Punjab.

== Career ==
In the 1980s the duo ended up composing for movies like Oomai Vizhigal, Senthoora Poove, Uzhavan Magan, Thaai Naadu, Urimai Geetham, Megam Karuththirukku, Velicham and these movies had several hit songs.

In particular, the song "Tholvi Nilayena Ninaithal" sung by P B Srinivas in the movie Oomai Vizhigal became a hit. The song went on to assume the role of an unofficial anthem of sorts for the LTTE in Sri Lanka.

The two split up around 1989. Following the split, Gyan Verma scored music for a couple of films on his own including Inaindha Kaigal and Sathya Vaakku. Manoj also tried his hand at scoring in a film titled Panthaya Kuthiraigal, but the film wasn't released to the public.

Years later, Manoj built a recording theater and eventually returned as a producer-music director in 1998, assuming the name of Manoj Bhatnagar. He produced and also directed the music for two films Endrendrum Kadhal (starring Vijay) and Good Luck (starring Prashanth). Both films received positive response with the audiences and critics.

== Discography ==
Year	Film	Language	Notes	Ref.
1981	Roohi	Hindi		
1986	Oomai Vizhigal	Tamil		
1986	Ek Misaal	Hindi		
1986	Oru Iniya Udhayam	Tamil		
1987	Velicham	Tamil		
1987	Uzhavan Magan	Tamil		
1987	Parisam Pottachu	Tamil		
1987	Evargal Indiyargal	Tamil		
1987	Urimai Geetham	Tamil		
1987	Senthoora Poove	Tamil		
1987	Thambathyam	Tamil		
1987	Vairagyam	Tamil		
1987	Megam Karuththirukku	Tamil		
1987	Ananda Aradhanai	Tamil		
1988	Hum Farishte Nahin	Hindi		
1988	Bahaar	Hindi		
1988	Anjaam Khuda Jaane	Hindi		
1989	Thaai Naadu	Tamil		
1989	Kadhal Enum Nadhiyinile	Tamil		
1990	Kalyana Rasi	Tamil		
1990	Inaindha Kaigal	Tamil	Composed by Gyan	
1990	Sathiyavakku	Tamil	Composed by Gyan	
1992	Annan Ennada Thambi Ennada	Tamil	Composed by Gyan	
1992	Mr. Prasad	Tamil	Composed by Manoj	
1992	Prema Sikharam / Anokha Premyudh	Telugu / Hindi	Composed by Manoj	
1993	Dhaadi	Telugu	Composed by Manoj	
1994	Siragadikka Aasai	Tamil	Composed by Manoj	
1994	Nyaya Rakshana	Telugu	Composed by Manoj	
1997	Samrat	Tamil	Composed by Manoj	
1999	Endrendrum Kadhal	Tamil	Composed by Manoj	
2000	Good Luck	Tamil	Composed by Manoj	
2007	Back to Honeymoon	Hindi	Composed by Manoj	
2008	Kuchh Din Kuchh Pal	Hindi	Composed by Manoj	

== Filmography ==
Manoj's other credits

Year	Film	Director	Producer	Language	Notes	Ref.
1986	Ek Misaal		Yes	Hindi		
1999	Endrendrum Kadhal	Yes	Yes	Tamil		
2000	Good Luck	Yes	Yes	Tamil		
2004	Shukriya: Till Death Do Us Apart		Yes	Hindi		
2004	Kaun Hai Jo Sapno Mein Aaya		Yes	Hindi		
2004	Chess: A Game Plan	Yes		Hindi	Unreleased film	
2005	Chocolate		Yes	Hindi		
