= Aabavanan =

Indian film director

- Born: Chinnasamy
- Citizenship: Indian
- Occupations: Producer, Director, Screenwriter, Lyricist, Music Director
- Years active: 1982–present
- Spouse: Thenmozhi

Aabavanan is an Indian screenwriter, lyricist, director and producer of Tamil films.

== Personal life ==
Aabavanan is married to Thenmozhi.

== Filmography ==
- Oomai Vizhigal (1986; also producer)
- Uzhavan Magan (1987)
- Senthoora Poove (1988)
- Thaai Naadu (1989)
- Inaindha Kaigal (1990)
- Annan Ennada Thambi Ennada (1992)
- Kaviya Thalaivan (1992)
- Mutrugai (1993)
- Karuppu Roja (1995)

Lyrics

- All songs (Oomai Vizhigal)
- All songs (Uzhavan Magan)
- Varapu Thalaiyane, Muthu Mani Pallakku, Aathukulle Yelelo (Senthoora Poove)
- All songs (Thaai Naadu)
- All songs (Inaintha Kaigal)
- All songs (Annan Ennada Thambi Ennada)
- All songs (Kaaviya Thalaivan)
- All songs (Mutrugai)
- All songs (Karuppu Roja)
