= Puli Varunne Puli =

- Directed by: Harikumar
- Written by: Harikumar
- Screenplay by: Harikumar
- Produced by: P. K. R. Pillai
- Starring: Mammootty; Nedumudi Venu; Bharat Gopy; Thilakan; Karamana Janardanan Nair; Lissy; Unnimary
- Cinematography: Vipin Mohan
- Edited by: G. Murali
- Music by: Jerry Amaldev
- Production company: Shirdi Sai Creations
- Distributed by: Shirdi Sai Creations
- Release date: 1 November 1985
- Country: India
- Language: Malayalam

Puli Varunne Puli is a 1985 Indian Malayalam film, directed by Harikumar and produced by P. K. R. Pillai. The film stars Mammootty, Nedumudi Venu, Lissy and Unnimary in the lead roles. The film has musical score by Jerry Amaldev.

== Cast ==
- Mammootty as K. P. Jayaraman
- Nedumudi Venu as R. Ramadasan
- Lissy as Subhashini
- Unnimary as Suhasini
- Sukumari as Bhavaniyamma
- Innocent as Tea Shop Owner
- Thilakan as Kuttithanam Kurup
- KPAC Lalitha as Sumathy
- Bharat Gopy as Municipal Chairman
- Idavela Babu as Babu
- Karamana Janardanan Nair as Municipal Commissioner
- Sreenath as Nath
- Kunchan as Kumar
- James as Hotel Manager
- Ragini as Thulasi
- Sandhya

== Soundtrack ==
Puli Varunne Puli

Soundtrack album by Jerry Amaldev
- Released: November 1985
- Genre: Film soundtrack
- Language: Malayalam

Jerry Amaldev chronology
Ente Mamattukkuttiyammakku (1983)	Puli Varunne Puli (1985)	Nokkethadhoorathu Kannum Nattu (1985)

The music was composed by Jerry Amaldev and the lyrics were written by Bichu Thirumala.

Track listing
No.	Title	Lyrics	Music	Singer(s)	Length
1.	"Ee Maanasam"	Bichu Thirumala	Jerry Amaldev	K. S. Chithra, P. Susheeladevi
2.	"Kakkaan Padikkumbol"	Bichu Thirumala	Jerry Amaldev	K. J. Yesudas, Kamukara
