= Saranya Mohan =

Indian actress

- Born: Saranya Mohan; 19 February 1989 (age 37); Alappuzha, Kerala, India
- Occupations: Actress; dancer; singer
- Years active: 1997–2015
- Spouse: Aravind Krishnan (m.2015)
- Children: 2

Saranya Mohan is an Indian dancer and former actress, who predominantly appeared in Tamil and Malayalam films. She has also acted in a few Telugu, Kannada and Hindi films. She is best known for her performances in Yaaradi Nee Mohini (2008), Vennila Kabadi Kuzhu (2009), Eeram (2009), Velayudham (2011) and Osthe (2011).

== Early life ==
Saranya is the eldest daughter of Mohan and Kalamandalam Devi. She has a younger sister named Sukanya who is also trained classical dancer. Both her parents are trained classical dancers and dance teachers, who together run a dance school, Y.K.B Dance Academy in Alappuzha, where Saranya herself also learnt dancing bharatanatyam. She studied at St. Joseph's College for Women, Alappuzha, completing her B. A. degree in English literature. After completing MA in English literature from Annamalai University, Chidambaram she completed MFA in Bharatanatyam from the same university.

== Career ==
She was brought to light by Malayalam director Fazil, who had seen Saranya dancing at her dancing school. After approaching and persuading her parents, he cast her for a child character in the 1997 Malayalam film Aniyathi Pravu and its Tamil remake, Kadhalukku Mariyadhai. Next she made appearance as a child artist in the hit Malayalam movie Harikrishnans with Mohanlal, Mammotty and Juhi Chawla in lead roles. Then she also was seen as a child artist in yet another Malayalam movie Rakthasakshikal Sindabad with Mohanlal. Then she took a break, concentrating on her studies, before enacting a supporting role in another Fazil directorial, Oru Naal Oru Kanavu (2005), in which she acted as a sister to the male lead character.

Her subsequent release, the Dhanush-Nayantara starrer Yaaradi Nee Mohini (2008), brought her into limelight. Her comedic performance as the younger sister to the lead female, who has a crush on her sister's love interest, won her fame and many accolades. She subsequently appeared in 3 more Tamil films in 2008, which, however, were less successful. These included the 1st one Jayamkondaan, next was Mahesh, Saranya Matrum Palar & finally Panchamirtham along with Jayaram . In year 2009, she had six releases, four of which being Tamil projects. Out of her Tamil releases, the tragedy sports film, Vennila Kabadi Kuzhu, directed by debutante Suseenthiran, and the supernatural thriller Eeram proved to be commercially as well as critically successful. The other two Tamil movies were A Aa E Ee with Prabhu and another Tamil movie was Arumugham with Bharath and Priyamani in lead roles. Later that year, she made her Telugu debut with Village Lo Vinayakudu and made her comeback to Malayalam films, starring in Chemistry. She also did the Telugu remake of her Tamil movie titled Bheemili Kabaddi Jattu in 2010, which also did well in the box office. Then she did one more Telugu movie Happy Happy Ga the same year. In 2011 was yet another Malayalam movie Nadakame Ulakam along with Mukesh, Vinu Mohan and Sarayu Mohan. Then she did a cameo role in the Tamil movie Azhagarsamiyin Kuthirai same year. In 2011 she also acted in M.Raja's Velayudham, which turned out to be a huge hit. Her role as Vijay's sister won her a lot of good reviews. Same year later she did a Malayalam movie Innanu Aa Kalyanam. She also acted in another film named Dharani's Osthe in the end of 2011 with Simbu in lead role. The year 2012 she had an entry to Kannada same year with her debut Kannada movie Ee Bhoomi Aa Bhanu. In 2014 she did her 2nd Kannada movie Paramashiva starring V. Ravichandran Sir too. Then the same year she made her Bollywood debut with Badlapur Boys opposite Nishan which was the Hindi remake of her hit Tamil movie Vennila Kabadi Kuzhu.

== Personal life ==
Saranya married her longtime boyfriend Aravind Krishnan on 6 September 2015 at Kottamkulangara Devi Temple, Alappuzha. They have a son named Anantapadmanabhan Aravind and a daughter named Annapoorna Aravind.

== Filmography ==
Year	Film	Role	Language	Notes
1997	Aniyathi Pravu	Mini's niece	Malayalam	Debut movie Child artist
1997	Kadhalukku Mariyadhai	Mini's niece	Tamil	Child artist Remake of Aniyathi Pravu
1998	Harikrishnans	Ammalu's friend	Malayalam	Child artist
1998	Rakthasakshikal Sindabad		Malayalam	Child artist
2001	Dosth	Child in cemetery	Tamil	Child artist
2005	Oru Naal Oru Kanavu	Meera	Tamil	
2006	Pachakuthira	Actress	Malayalam	
2008	Yaaradi Nee Mohini	Pooja (Anandhavalli)	Tamil	Nominated, Filmfare Best Tamil Supporting Actress Award; Nominated, Vijay Award for Best Supporting Actress
2008	Jayamkondaan	Archana Durairaj	Tamil	
2008	Mahesh, Saranya Matrum Palar	Keerthana	Tamil	
2008	Panchamirtham	Seetha	Tamil	
2009	A Aa E Ee	Eeswari	Tamil	
2009	Vennila Kabadi Kuzhu	Village girl	Tamil	
2009	Eeram	Divya Sreeriraman	Tamil	
2009	Arumugam	Mallika	Tamil	
2009	Village Lo Vinayakudu	Kavya	Telugu	
2009	Chemistry	Parvathy	Malayalam	
2010	Bheemili Kabaddi Jattu	Village girl	Telugu	Remake of Vennila Kabadi Kuzhu
2010	Kalyanram Kathi	Haritha	Telugu	
2010	Happy Happy Ga	Priya	Telugu	
2011	Ponnu Kondoru Aalroopam		Malayalam	
2011	Nadakame Ulakam	Nandhana	Malayalam	
2011	Azhagarsamiyin Kudhirai	Rani	Tamil	
2011	Velayudham	Kaveri	Tamil	
2011	Innanu Aa Kalyanam	Aisha	Malayalam	
2011	Osthe	Nirmala	Tamil	
2012	Perinoru Makan	Bhama	Malayalam	
2013	Ee Bhoomi Aa Bhanu	Bhoomi	Kannada	
2013	Kolagalam	Ramya	Tamil	
2014	Paramashiva	Swathi	Kannada	
2014	Kadhalai Thavira Verondrum Illai	Kamali	Tamil	
2014	Badlapur Boys	Sapna	Hindi	Final film role Remake of Vennila Kabadi Kuzhu

== Television ==
=== Serials ===
- 2008 Meera (Asianet) as Meera
- 2007 Manassariyathe (Surya TV)
- 2007 Mounanombaram (Kairali TV)
- 2007 Aa Amma (Kairali TV)
- 2006 Swami Ayyappan (Asianet) as Malikapurathamma
- 2005 Krishnakripasagaram (Amrita TV) as Ambai Pennu

=== Shows ===
- Nuvvu Nenu - Telugu game show
- Parayam Nedam - Malayalam game show
- Celebrity Taste - Malayalam cookery show
- Vivel Big Break - Malayalam reality show
- Red Carpet - Malayalam reality show
- Panam Tharum Padam - Malayalam game show

== Endorsements ==
- Kalyan Jewellers
- Wedland Silks & Sareees
- AVR
- Pampers
