= Jerry Amaldev =

Indian music composer

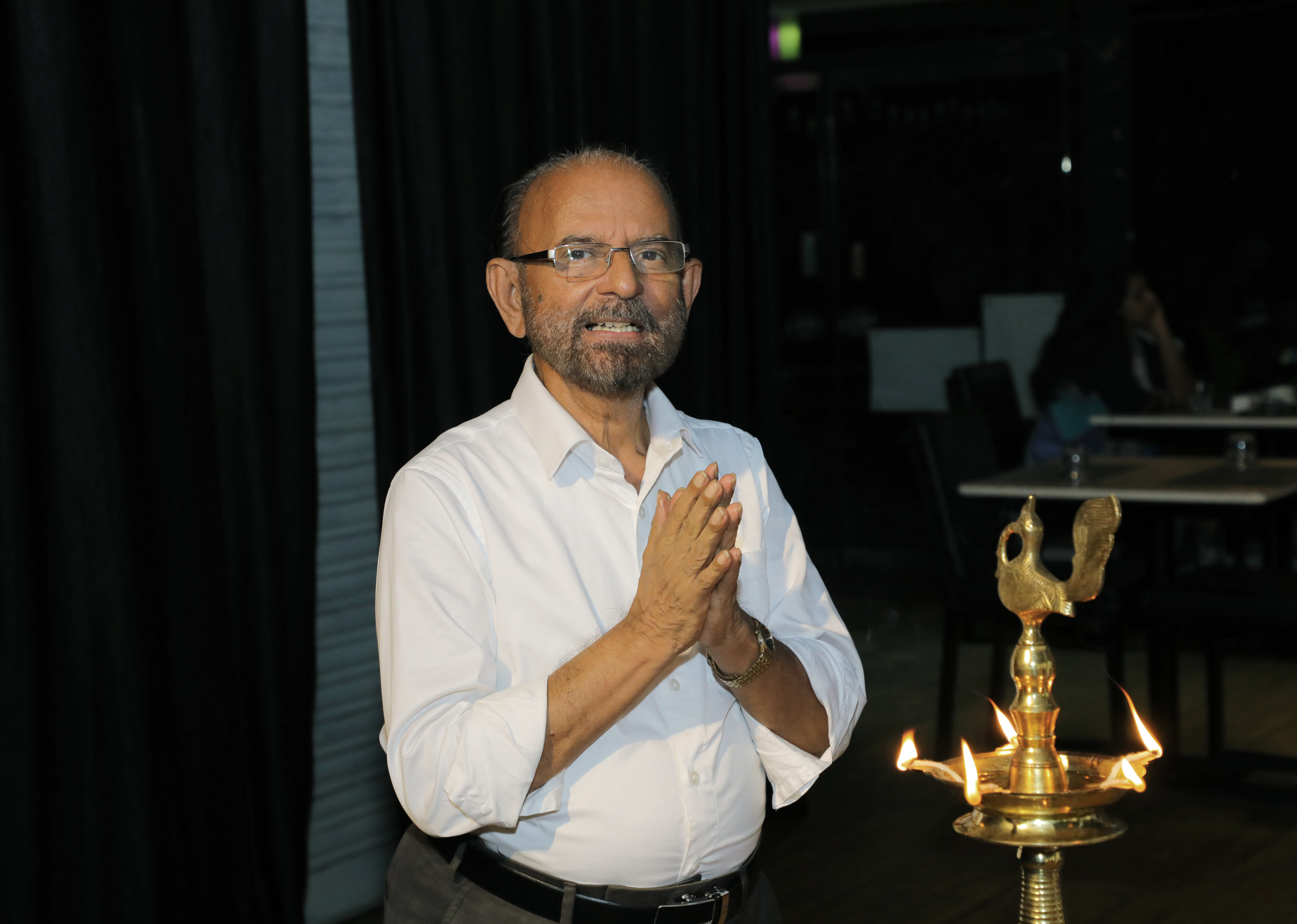
- Jerry Amaldev at a function in November 2019

Background information
- Also known as: Jerry
- Born: Jerome Thomas Veleeparambil; 15 April 1939 (age 87); Kochi, Kerala, India
- Genres: Film score; choral music
- Occupation: Music director
- Instruments: Piano; violin; guitar
- Years active: 1965–present
- Website: jerryamaldev.com

Jerome Thomas Veleeparambil (born 15 April 1939), professionally known as Jerry Amaldev, is an Indian music composer and conductor who has predominantly worked in Malayalam cinema. A three-time recipient of the Kerala State Film Award, he is known for his melodic compositions, which blend elements of Indian classical music with accessible orchestral arrangements.

His notable films as a music director are Manjil Virinja Pookkal, Aparahnam, Ennennum Kannettante, Ente Mamattikkuttiyammakku, Nokketha Dhoorathu Kannum Nattu and Guruji oru Vakku.

== Personal life ==
Jerry Amaldev was born as Jerome Thomas Veleeparambil, on 15 April 1939, to Mary and V. C. Joseph of Veleeparambil house in Kochi, Ernakulam in Kerala.

Jerome completed his high school education in 1955 at St. Albert's High School, Ernakulam. He obtained the degree of Bachelor of Philosophy from Jnana Deepa, Institute of Philosophy and Theology

Amaldev was married to Jolly Jerry Amaldev and has three daughters Meera, Sangeeta and Dahlia. His wife died in 2008 due to cancer. Currently, he lives in Palatty, Kannachanthodu Road, Kochi.

== Career ==
Amaldev made his debut as a music director in Malayalam cinema with Manjil Virinja Pookkal (1980), directed by Fazil. For the film, he received the Kerala State Award for Excellence in Music Direction. Prior to his debut, he worked as an assistant to the Indian music director Naushad.

Amaldev received training in Hindustani vocal music under Madhusoodan Patwardhan at the Vishnu Digambar Sangeet Vidyalaya in Pune. Following the commercial success of Manjil Virinja Pookkal, he became an active music director in the Malayalam film industry, composing music for approximately 75 films.

In addition to his work in Malayalam cinema, Amaldev conducted a musical programme during Pope John Paul II's visit to India, featuring a choir of 500 singers and an orchestra of 40 musicians. He has also composed music for several Hindi films.

During the early 2000s, Amaldev became less active in the Malayalam film industry. No. 1 Snehatheeram Bangalore North was one of his last Malayalam film projects before his hiatus from film music.

Following his departure from the Malayalam film industry, Amaldev taught music at the American International School, Chennai. He later joined Choice School in Kochi as a music teacher, while also composing music for socially relevant films and television serials. He has also served as Professor of History of Music and Conducting, as well as Academic Adviser, at the Asian Christian College of Music in Kottayam.

Amaldev returned to Malayalam cinema in 2016 as the music director for the songs of Action Hero Biju, directed by Abrid Shine and starring Nivin Pauly.

== Awards ==
- Kerala State Film Award for Best Music Director – 1980 – Manjil Virinja Pookkal
- Kerala State Film Award for Best Music Director – 1990 – Aparahnam [ Shared with Perumbavoor G. Raveendranath – Innale ]
- Kerala State Film Award for Best Background Music – 1995 – Kazhakam
- Kerala Sangeetha Nataka Akademi Award for Light Music – 2001

== Partial discography ==
Year	Film	Lyricist	Notes
1980	Manjil Virinja Pookkal	Bichu Thirumala	He won Kerala State Film Award for Best Music Director. Background score was done by Guna Singh for which he won Kerala State Film Award for Best Background Music
1981	Dwandha Yudham	P. Bhaskaran	
1982	Pooviriyum Pulari	Poovachal Khader	
1982	Oru Vilippadakale	P. Bhaskaran	
1983	Swapnalokum	O. N. V. Kurup	
1983	Ente Mamattukkuttiyammakku	Bichu Thirumala	
1984	Nokkethadhoorathu Kannum Nattu	Bichu Thirumala	Background score is done by Johnson.
1985	Kaanathaya Penkutty	Sebastian Paul	
1985	Puli Varunne Puli	Bichu Thirumala	
1985	Scene No. 7	P. Bhaskaran	
1985	Punnaram Cholli Cholli	O. N. V. Kurup	Background score is done by Johnson.
1985	Koodum Thedi	M. D. Rajendran	Background score is done by Johnson.
1985	Guruji Oru Vakku	Bichu Thirumala	Background score is done by Johnson.
1985	Adhyayam Onnu Muthal	M. D. Rajendran	
1986	Aalorungi Arangorungi	Poovachal Khader	
1986	Adukkan Entheluppam	Bichu Thirumala	
1986	Sanmanassullavarkku Samadhanam	Mullanezhi	Background score is done by Shyam.
1986	Vivahithare Ithile	Bichu Thirumala	
1986	Sunil Vayassu 20		
1986	Oppam Oppathinoppam	Bichu Thirumala	
1986	Neela Kurinji Poothappol	Kavalam Narayana Panicker	
1986	Ennennum Kannettante	Kaithapram Damodaran Namboothiri, Madhu Muttam, Thunchaththu Ezhuthachan	
1991	Aparahnam		He won Kerala State Film Award for Best Music Director, shared with Perumbavoor G. Raveendranath.
1991	Ganamela	Sasi Chittanjoor, Kaithapram Damodaran Namboothiri.	
1995	No. 1 Snehatheeram Bangalore North	Girish Puthenchery	
2016	Action Hero Biju	Santhosh Varma, B K Harinarayanan	All songs except, Muthe Ponne Pinangalle, were done by him. Muthe Ponne Pinangalle were done by V Suresh Thampanoor. Background score is done by Rajesh Murugesan.
2025	e valayam	Santhosh Varma, Rafeeq ahmed	

== Selected Malayalam songs ==
Jerry Amaldev has composed numerous songs for Malayalam films. Some of his notable compositions include:

- "Aayiram Kannumayi Kathirunnu" – Nokkethadhoorathu Kannum Nattu
- "Raave Nilaave" – Raave Nilaave
- "Pookkal Panineer Pookkal" – Action Hero Biju
- "Deva Dundubi" and "Poovattaka" – Ennennum Kannettante
- "Vaachalam En Mounavum" – Koodum Thedi
- "Penninte Chenchundil" – Guruji Oru Vakku
- "Alorungi Arangorungi" – Ente Mamattikkuttiyammakku
- "Manjanikkombil" and "Mizhiyoram Nananjozhukum"– Manjil Virinja Pookkal
- "Kiliye" – Nokkethadhoorathu Kannum Nattu
- "Pavizhamalli Poothulanja" – Sanmanassullavarkku Samadhanam
- "Kur Kur Kurmozhikal" and "Poomukile"– Ariyathe (1986; unreleased)
- "Poovalla Poonthaliralla" – Kaattupothu (unreleased)
- "Mele Mele Maanam" and "Kokkorusumen" – No. 1 Snehatheeram Bangalore North
- "Vellodin Kingini" and "Kaalamam Nadi Alakale" – E Valayam
