= Shalini (actress) =

Indian actress (born 1976)

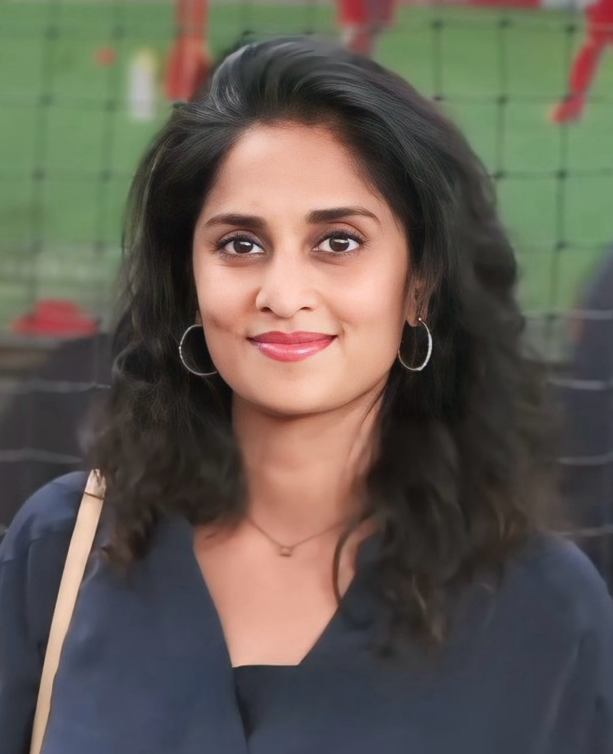
- Shalini in 2023
- Born: Shalini Babu; 20 November 1979 (age 46); Thiruvalla, Kerala, India
- Occupation: Actress
- Years active: 1983–1991 (child artist); 1997–2001
- Spouse: Ajith Kumar (m. 2000)
- Children: 2
- Relatives: Shamlee (sister); Richard Rishi (brother)

Shalini (formerly known as Baby Shalini; born 20 November 1979) is a former Indian actress and child artist who worked in Tamil and Malayalam films. During the 80s, Shalini was a child artist in Malayalam and Tamil films.

After a brief hiatus from acting, Shalini made a comeback in 1997 through Malayalam and Tamil language films as a lead heroine. She retired from films soon after marrying Tamil actor Ajith Kumar in April 2000.

== Early life ==
Shalini is a Pentecostal Christian. She was born to Babu and Alice on 20 November 1979. Her father, a Muslim originally from Kollam in Kerala, migrated to Madras with an ambition of becoming an actor and the family settled there. Alice is a Christian, whose parents are from Kerala. Shalini is the middle child. Her younger sister Shamili and her elder brother Richard are also film actors. Shalini attended Fatima Matriculation Higher Secondary School (K.G to 8th), and Adarsh Vidyalaya, Chennai (9th to 10th). She completed college at Annamalai University. Shalini has stated that she enjoys badminton and has played in a few state-level tournaments.

== Career ==
Shalini started her career as a child artist. She also played the lead character in the TV serial Amloo telecast in the late 1980s on Doordarshan. Her iconic hairstyle, a short bob with a front fringe, was popularly known as the “Baby Shalini hair cut”.

Shalini and her siblings, Shamili and Richard Rishi, acted as child artists in the 1990 Telugu language blockbuster film Jagadeka Veerudu Athiloka Sundari.

Shalini soon went to study, and she returned to acting with Aniyathipravu, which was a blockbuster. In her next film Kaliyoonjal (1997), she co-starred with Mammootty and Dileep and it released to mixed reviews. After the success of the Malayalam Aniyathipravu, Fazil remade it in Tamil as Kadhalukku Mariyadhai (1997) with Vijay. Initially, Fazil was keen on casting a débutante in the lead female role, but Shalini insisted that she should also star in the Tamil version. Like the Malayalam version, Kadhalukku Mariyadhai was also a blockbuster, and Shalini's performance was also praised, with Indolink.com recommending the film and stating that "Shalini returns in this film with a good performance".

For the movie Amarkkalam (1999) with Ajith Kumar, Saran initially approached Shalini, who was studying at the time and she refused, however, after a three-month pursuit, he finally got her to sign on as well. She was offered a role in Padayappa, which she rejected. The success of the film Kadhalukku Mariyadhai prompted Fazil to make another film with the lead pair, Vijay and Shalini, in Kannukkul Nilavu (2000). She acted with R. Madhavan in the romantic drama Alaipayuthey (2000) directed by Mani Ratnam. She was last seen in the romantic comedy film Piriyadha Varam Vendum (2001) with Prashanth.

== Personal life ==
In 1999, during the shoot of Saran's Amarkkalam, Shalini began to date her co-star Ajith Kumar, who proposed to Shalini. They got married on 24 April 2000 at Chennai. Ajith Kumar is a practicing Hindu. After their marriage, Shalini retired as an actress following the completion of two of her unfinished projects. The couple have two children; a daughter Anoushka (born January 3, 2008) and a son Aadvik (born March 2, 2015).

== Filmography ==
=== As a child artist ===
Year	Film	Role	Language	Notes
1983	Bezawada Bebbuli		Telugu	
1983	Aadyathe Anuraagam	Rajumon	Malayalam	
1983	Oomakkuyil		Malayalam	
1983	Ente Mamattikkuttiyammakku	Mamattukuttiyama/Tintu	Malayalam	Kerala State Film Award for Best Child Artist
1983	Apoorva Sahodarigal		Tamil	
1983	Aanandha Kummi		Tamil	
1984	Muthodu Muthu	Achimol	Malayalam	
1984	Oru Sumangaliyude Katha	Raji	Malayalam	
1984	Chakkarayumma	Shalu Mol	Malayalam	
1984	Onnum Mindatha Bharya	Achuthan Nair's daughter	Malayalam	
1984	Krishna Guruvayoorappa	Unnikrishnan	Malayalam	
1984	Amme Narayana		Malayalam	
1984	Sandarbham	Ravi's daughter	Malayalam	
1984	NH 47	Mini	Malayalam	
1984	Mangalam Nerunnu	Usha	Malayalam	
1984	Koottinilamkili	Nandini/Rajimol	Malayalam	Dual Role
1984	Osai	Baby Shalini	Tamil	
1984	Minimol Vathicanil	Minimol	Malayalam	
1984	Onnanu Nammal	Sonykutty	Malayalam	
1985	Vannu Kandu Keezhadakki	Shalu	Malayalam	
1985	Bandham	Asha	Telugu	
1985	Bandham	Asha	Tamil	
1985	Pillai Nila	Shalini / Shalu	Tamil	Dual Role
1985	Amudha Gaanam	Meena	Tamil	
1985	Jeevante Jeevan	Biju	Malayalam	
1985	Akkacheyude Kunjuvava	Chakkimol	Malayalam	
1985	Oru Nokku Kanan	Chinnukkutty/Unnimol	Malayalam	Dual Role
1985	Kongumudi	Padma	Malayalam	
1985	Katha Ithuvare	Ramyamol	Malayalam	
1985	Oru Kudakeezhil	Baby Sridevi	Malayalam	
1985	Aazhi		Malayalam	
1985	Aanakkorumma	Bindu	Malayalam	
1985	Iniyum Kadha Thudarum	Ravindran's daughter	Malayalam	
1985	Ormikkaan Omanikkaan		Malayalam	
1985	Muhurtham Pathnonnu Muppathinu	Raji or Rajee	Malayalam	
1986	Prathyyekom Shradikkuka	Minimol	Malayalam	
1986	Bharya Oru Manthri	Anithamol	Malayalam	
1986	Viduthalai	Shalini	Tamil	
1986	Ente Entethu Mathrem	Sreemol, Bindu	Malayalam	Dual role
1986	Ee Jeeva Ninagagi	Latha	Kannada	Also playback singer and only Kannada film till date
1986	Nilave Malare	Priya	Tamil	Cinema Express Award for Best Child Artist
1986	Aayiram Kannudayaal		Tamil	
1986	Jailu Pakshi		Telugu	
1987	Amme Bhagavathi	Durga	Malayalam	
1987	Sirai Paravai		Tamil	
1987	Shankar Guru	Devi	Tamil	
1987	Chinnari Devatha	Devi	Telugu	
1987	Saradhamba		Telugu	
1987	Michael Raj		Tamil	
1987	Rowdy Babai		Tamil	
1988	Brahma Puthrudu	Sridevi	Telugu	
1988	Chutti Poonai	Shalini	Tamil	
1988	August 15 Raatri		Telugu	
1989	Varusham 16		Tamil	
1989	Rakhwala	Mini	Hindi	Only Bollywood film till date
1989	Raja Chinna Roja	Chitra	Tamil	
1989	Bhagavan	Baby	Telugu	
1990	Jagadeka Veerudu Atiloka Sundari	Pandu	Telugu	

=== As a lead actress ===
Year	Film	Role	Language	Notes
1997	Aniyathipraavu	Mini	Malayalam	
1997	Kaliyoonjal	Ammu	Malayalam	
1997	Kadhalukku Mariyadhai	Mini	Tamil	Remake of Aniyathipraavu
1998	Nakshatratharattu	Hema	Malayalam	
1998	Kaikudunna Nilavu	Veni	Malayalam	
1998	Sundarakilladi	Devayani	Malayalam	
1999	Prem Poojari	Hema	Malayalam	
1999	Amarkkalam	Mohana	Tamil	Also playback singer
1999	Niram	Sona	Malayalam	
2000	Kannukkul Nilavu	Hema	Tamil	
2000	Alaipayuthey	Shakti	Tamil	Tamil Nadu State Film Award Special Prize for Best Actress; Nominated, Filmfare Award for Best Actress - Tamil
2001	Piriyadha Varam Vendum	Nithiyakalyani	Tamil	Remake of Niram
