= A Aa E Ee (2009 Tamil film) =

2009 film by Sabapathy Dekshinamurthy

- Theatrical release poster
- Directed by: Sabapathy Dekshinamurthy
- Written by: V. Srinivasan (dialogues)
- Story by: Krishna Vamsi
- Produced by: AVM K. Shanmugam
- Starring: Prabhu; Navdeep; Aravind Akash; Monica; Saranya Mohan
- Cinematography: Aruldas
- Edited by: K. Shankar; K. Thangavel Kumaran
- Music by: Vijay Antony
- Distributed by: AVM Productions
- Release date: 9 January 2009
- Running time: 130 minutes
- Country: India
- Language: Tamil

A Aa E Ee is a 2009 Indian Tamil-language romantic drama film directed by Sabapathy Dekshinamurthy. It stars Prabhu, Navdeep, Aravind Akash, Monica, and Saranya Mohan, whilst, supporting actors Cochin Haneefa, Livingston, Manorama and Ganja Karuppu play other prominent roles. Produced by the oldest Tamil film production company, AVM Productions, the film was released on 9 January 2009. The film is a remake of Telugu film Chandamama. The film received mixed reviews from critics.

== Plot ==
Subramaniam (Prabhu), an ayurvedic physician, is a much-respected man in his village. His only daughter Anitha (Monica) returns home from Chennai after completing a course in fashion designing. Having lost her mother at a very young age, Anitha is close to her father, and they share a special bond. Soon, Anitha's marriage is fixed with Elango (Aravind Akash), the son of Vedachalam (Cochin Haneefa). While Vedachalam is a good-for-nothing chap, Elango is a perfect match. Elango falls in love with Anitha, but she tells him of her past: her lover Akash (Navdeep), who had jilted her after a one-night stand. Elango, though shattered, meets Akash and tries to unite him with Anitha. In this attempt, he finds himself falling in love with Anitha's cousin Eeswari (Saranya Mohan). Now the story is about uniting the two pairs of lovers. Anitha does not want painful memories from her past hurting her father .

== Cast ==
- Prabhu as Subramaniam
- Navdeep as Aakash
- Monica as Anitha
- Aravind Akash as Elango
- Saranya Mohan as Eeswari
- V. M. C. Haneefa as Vedachalam
- Livingston as Police officer
- Manorama as Elango's grandmother
- Ganja Karuppu as Kicha
- Sathyan as Elango's friend
- Bonda Mani
- Pandu as Doctor
- R. S. Shivaji as Police officer
- Vasu Vikram
- Mohan Raman as Drummer
- S. N. Lakshmi

== Production ==
The film was shot in locations like Thenkasi, Kuttralam, Ambasamudram, Manimutharu, Karaikudi, Thirumayam, and Salem in Tamilnadu and in Challakudi at Kerala. The song "Kannivedi" choreographed by Bobby was done with 456 cut shots.

== Soundtrack ==
Soundtrack was composed by Vijay Antony and lyrics by Eknath, Priyan and Annamalai. Rediff wrote "Though Vijay Antony seems to want to go beyond his Kadhalil Vizhunthen tracks, it still looks like the hangover exists. Some numbers are passable, while others are down-right boring". Milliblog wrote "A aa e ee is a middling soundtrack from the Nakka mukka man". Behindwoods wrote "Vijay Antony has employed creative musical idioms in this album. The sound mixing is good!".

A Aa E Ee

Soundtrack album by Vijay Antony
- Released: 2009
- Genre: Feature film soundtrack
- Language: Tamil

Vijay Antony chronology
Kadhalil Vizhunthen (2008)	A Aa E Ee (2009)	TN 07 AL 4777 (2009)

No.	Song	Singers	Lyrics
1	"A Aa E Ee"	Rahul Nambiar, Dinesh	Priyan
2	"Dingi Tappu"	Megha, Sheeba, Vinaya, Maya, Ramya NSK, Vijay Antony	Eknaath
3	"Kanni Vedi"	Vijay Antony, Sangeetha Rajeshwaran	Eknaath
4	"Mena Minuki"	Vijay Antony, Suchitra, Surmukhi Raman, Sangeetha Rajeshwaran	Vijay Antony
5	"Natta Nada"	Sangeetha Rajeshwaran, Karthik, Christopher	Annamalai
6	"Tappo Tappo"	Bakshi, Sulabha	Eknaath

== Release and reception ==
The film was originally slated to release on 18 December 2008 but got postponed and released on 9 January 2009.

Times of India wrote "If only the director had trimmed the first few minutes where Prabhu 'hardsells' ayurveda, had one song less, and shortened the build up to the climax, the occasional drag could have been avoided". Behindwoods wrote "Imagine those drag sitcoms they used to telecast on national television, especially the ones that are made in less-than-a-shoe-string’s budget and happen mostly in a single room with the help of set props to depict different locations? We didn’t find ‘A Aa E Ee’ any different from those sitcoms and the movie was nightmarishly reminiscent of those excruciatingly boring, no-other-choice days". Indiaglitz wrote "If you can forgive thee first ten minutes of the movie, 'A AA E EE' is worth a watch. A florid bouquet can be given to Sabhapathy, for his guts to make a movie sans any hero worship or vulgar comedies". Pavithra Srinivasan of Rediff wrote "For a feel-good comedy, this one falls remarkably flat". Mythily Ramachandran of Nowrunning wrote "There are moments when the film sags, but if you have a penchant for clean family drama, this one could be straight up your alley".
