= Kannukkul Nilavu =

- Theatrical release poster
- Directed by: Fazil
- Written by: Gokula Krishnan (Dialogue)
- Screenplay by: Fazil
- Story by: Fazil
- Produced by: Mohan Natarajan
- Starring: Vijay; Shalini; Kaveri
- Cinematography: Ananda Kuttan
- Edited by: K. R. Gowrishankar; T. R. Sekar
- Music by: Ilaiyaraaja
- Production company: Chinthamani Cine Arts
- Distributed by: Ayngaran International
- Release date: 14 January 2000
- Running time: 170 minutes
- Country: India
- Language: Tamil

Kannukkul Nilavu (transl. The moon in [my] eyes) is a 2000 Indian Tamil-language romantic psychological thriller film written and directed by Fazil. The film stars Vijay, Shalini, and Kaveri in the lead roles, while Raghuvaran, Srividya, and Ponvannan play other supporting roles. The film marks Vijay's 25th film and his first film of the new 2000s millennium, Kaveri's Tamil debut, and the second collaboration of both Vijay and Shalini after Kadhalukku Mariyadhai (1997). The film is about a young man who has a neurological condition that results in partial retrograde amnesia and delusions due to a head injury and his subsequent recovery thanks to a woman and her psychiatrist father.

Kannukkul Nilavu was released on 14 January 2000 to positive reviews and was a decent hit, with from praise for its suspenseful story and Vijay's performance.

== Plot ==
The film starts with Gautham Prabhakar searching all around Pondicherry in vain for a girl named Gayathri. He encounters a group of friends led by Hema and asks for their help in locating Gayathri, who appears to be his lover. The group members are initially hostile to Gautham but eventually decide to help him after he pursues them aggressively, and Hema realises that he may be suffering from a neurological condition resulting in amnesia and delusions. Hema's father Dr. Rajashekar is a psychiatrist who discovers Gautham's real condition and the dangers it poses.

It is revealed that Gautham was actually a musicologist. About six months earlier, he had travelled to a hill resort in Tamil Nadu for his research on musical patterns in the sounds of nature. While on that trip, he encountered three men - Prakash, Soundar, and Shanmugam - who all hailed from Pondicherry. Gayathri was a local girl who was teased frequently by the three men. She regularly ran up to Gautham to seek refuge from the men's pursuits. Then, one day, the three men got drunk and began molesting Gayathri. Hearing her screams, Gautham and his friend Balaji attempted to rescue Gayathri. In the ensuing fight, Balaji's knee was struck with an axe, Gayathri dropped unconscious, and Gautham was hit hard on the head with the blunt end of the axe. The way Gautham remembers it is that the three men had molested and murdered Gayathri and then had left Gautham for dead after striking him on the head. Gautham, in his hypnotic state, swears furiously to Rajashekar that he will avenge Gayathri's murder by capturing and killing the three men responsible. As it is revealed later in the film, Gayathri had not died but had merely passed out.

Rajasekhar explains to Hema and her friends why Gautham viewed Gayathri as his lover in his delusional state, even though she actually had no relationship with him and he was merely trying to be a Good Samaritan. He also explains that if Gautham were treated and his memories brought back, then it could potentially create a new Gautham, a violent and aggressive one, who goes on a killing spree. Unable to decide on the next step forward, on Hema's suggestion, they decide to delay any action until Gautham's mother arrives from Malaysia. It is revealed through intermittent scenes that the mother, having not had contact with her son in the last six months, is already out of her home, searching desperately for her son in India.

Until the mother arrived, the kind Hema took care of Gautham. Gautham, for unknown reasons, becomes fond of Hema and believes deeply that she is the only person who can help him. In return, Hema also begins to develop feelings of affection and love towards Gautham. Hema even wonders if it would be possible to bring Gautham back to normal by showering him with enough care and affection that he forgets about Gayathri altogether. This strategy fails, as once the mother arrives, Gautham's memories come flooding back to him, and he turns into a ruthless revenge-seeker, terrorising both his mother and Hema and swearing to kill the three men who had supposedly murdered Gayathri.

The remainder of the film is about how Gautham's mother and Hema put up with the new villainous Gautham, while Rajashekar devises and implements an ingenious plan to cure him. Rajashekar manages to contact the three men, who reveal the truth: Gayathri was still alive. The three men are innocent, and the only terrible mistake they made was drunkenly striking Gautham on the head, resulting in this whole mess. While Gautham manages to capture Prakash and Soundar in revenge, Rajashekar and Shanmugam successfully trick him into entering Gayathri's current home by giving him chase. Gautham is initially dumbstruck at seeing Gayathri still alive, but reality eventually sinks in, and he is cured completely. He apologises to his mother, Shanmugam, and Hema for his torturous acts; reveals the location where he held the other two men captive; and profusely thanks Rajashekar and Hema for their efforts. Hema looks on sadly, wondering if this is the last she will see of Gautham. Rajashekar senses this and gives a non-verbal consent for Gautham to take his daughter with him. Hema is overjoyed, and the two, along with Gautham's mother, drive back.

== Cast ==
- Vijay as Gautham Prabhakar
- Shalini as Hema Raasasekar, Gautham’s helper
- Kaveri as Gayathri, Gautham's old love interest
- Raghuvaran as Dr. Rajasekhar, Hema’s father
- Srividya as Gautham's mother
- Charle as Surya
- Dhamu as Chandra
- Madhan Bob as Belgium
- Thalaivasal Vijay as Shanmugam
- Ponvannan as Soundar
- Shajin as Prakash
- Devi Chandana as Niveda
- Radhika as Hema's friend
- Sandra Amy as Hema's friend
- Mohan Raman
- S. N. Parvathy

== Production ==
Mohan Natarajan brought back together the team of the successful 1997 film Kadhalukku Mariyadhai in director Fazil and leading pair Vijay and Shalini with the venture. Filming began in July 1999, after Vijay eventually completed the shooting for his previous romantic comedy Minsara Kanna (1999). Anandakuttan was signed on to handle the camera and Ilaiyaraja to compose the music, while K. R. Gowrishankar and T. R. Sekar took charge of the editing, while the art direction was handled by Mani Suchitra. The shooting of the film took place in cities around Tamil Nadu and Kerala.

== Soundtrack ==
The soundtrack was composed by Ilaiyaraaja, while the lyrics were written by Palani Bharathi.

Track listing
No.	Title	Singer(s)	Length
1.	"Iravu Pagalai Theda"	K. J. Yesudas	5:16
2.	"Nilavu Paatu"	Hariharan	6:04
3.	"Oru Naal Oru Kanavu" (Male version)	K. J. Yesudas	4:49
4.	"Oru Naal Oru Kanavu" (duet)	K. J. Yesudas, Anuradha Sriram	4:49
5.	"Adida Melathai"	S. P. Balasubrahmanyam, S. N. Surendar, Arunmozhi	5:11
6.	"Roja Poonthotam"	P. Unnikrishnan, Anuradha Sriram	4:54
7.	"Enthen Kuilenge"	P. Unnikrishnan, Anuradha Sriram	4:55
8.	"Chinnanchiru Kiliye"	K. S. Chithra	5:03
Total length:			41:01

== Release and reception ==
Kannukkul Nilavu released on 14 January 2000. The Hindu said that it was a "tremendous comeback vehicle for Vijay, wherein he portrays an entire gamut of emotions". The reviewer added that the film was "subtle in scenic presentation and characterisation, suspense without melodrama and spontaneity in reactions are plusses", while mentioning that Shalini was "flawless" in her role. Aswathy of Rediff.com described it as a "film worth seeing", labelling that "the highlight of the film is actor Vijay's power-packed performance". The critic described that the "actor has shown laudable skill both in the way he has handled this complicated role and in expressing various shades of Gautham's tormented mind. Especially from the moment he becomes aggressive, with the violent streak predominating and eyes blazing with manic fury." K. N. Vijiyan of New Straits Times noted that the film "offers something different from usual love stories and should appease Vijay's fans". Ananda Vikatan rated the film 40 out of 100. Tamil Star wrote, "Have you a penchant for psychoanalytical films? Are you intrigued by the complexities of the human mind?--- Then Kannukkul Nilavu will not disappoint you".

Ananda Kuttan and Stun Siva won the Tamil Nadu State Film Award for Best Cinematographer and Tamil Nadu State Film Award for Best Stunt Coordinator for their works in the film respectively.
