= Killer (1992 film) =

- Theatrical release poster
- Directed by: Fazil
- Screenplay by: Fazil; Jandhyala (dialogues)
- Story by: Fazil
- Produced by: V. B. Rajendra Prasad
- Starring: Nagarjuna; Nagma
- Cinematography: Ananda Kuttan; Rajendranath
- Edited by: T. R. Shekhar
- Music by: Ilaiyaraaja
- Production company: Jagapathi Art Pictures
- Distributed by: Annapurna Studios
- Release date: 10 January 1992
- Running time: 158 minutes
- Country: India
- Language: Telugu

Killer is a 1992 Indian Telugu-language action thriller film written and directed by Fazil and produced by V. B. Rajendra Prasad under his company Jagapathi Art Pictures. It stars Nagarjuna and Nagma. The music was composed by Ilaiyaraaja.

== Plot ==
The movie commences with a tense scene: goons relentlessly pursue a pregnant woman. Amidst the chaos, Mary, a compassionate nurse, aids her, and a boy named Eeswar is born. Evading the pursuing goons, Mary manages to escape with the newborn, while the pregnant woman succumbs to the goons' brutality.

Despite having two sons of her own, Mary takes Eeswar into her home, raising him alongside her biological children. Over time, Mary gives birth to another child, Nancy, and it is only then that Eeswar discovers Mary is not his biological mother. Faced with financial difficulties, Mary is compelled to send Eeswar to an orphanage, where he grapples with numerous challenges, transforming into a resilient individual who resorts to physical confrontations for financial gain.

During this tumultuous journey, Eeswar clashes with a police officer and subsequently finds himself entangled in a skirmish with Bhupati Raja's henchmen. Learning about Eeswar's capabilities, Bhupati Raja offers a substantial sum to eliminate Malavika and Sneha, two individuals residing in Hyderabad, within a tight 15-day timeframe.

Before embarking on this perilous mission, Eeswar visits Mary, providing her with funds for medical treatment. Mary, curious about the source of the money, cautions Eeswar against engaging in any illicit activities. Undeterred, Eeswar heads to Hyderabad, where his attempt to carry out the assassination fails. However, amidst his mission, he becomes enamored with Priya, who is linked to Malavika's household.

To get closer to Priya, Eeswar adopts a false identity as Prem Krishna, a foreign returnee, manipulating Priya and kindling a romantic connection with her. When Priya discloses her association with Malavika, Eeswar leverages this information to orchestrate a meeting with Malavika, who, unaware of Eeswar's true intentions, becomes fond of him.

As the plot thickens, Bhupati Raja's sinister plans escalate. Eeswar finds himself entrusted with a dangerous task: delivering a booby-trapped bouquet to Sneha. Simultaneously, Malavika reveals her intention to donate her assets to an orphanage, a decision prompted by the threats posed by Bhupati Raja, who harbors political ambitions.

The narrative takes a dark turn as Bhupati Raja's treacherous actions unfold. Malavika's husband, determined to expose Bhupati Raja's misdeeds, becomes a target and eventually falls victim to the antagonist's deadly schemes. Faced with impending danger, Eeswar, who learns of his familial connection to Malavika, undergoes a transformation, abandoning his mission to protect Malavika and Sneha.

Bhupati Raja retaliates by kidnapping Eeswar's sister, coercing him to bring Sneha to save her. Cornered and left with no alternative, Eeswar kidnaps Sneha and presents her to Bhupati Raja. The tension escalates as Malavika intervenes, confronting Mary to unveil the truth.

Eeswar battles the goons, rescuing his sister and Sneha. The truth unfolds as Malavika and Eeswar are finally reunited, with Malavika revealing the familial bond that exists between them—Eeswar is her nephew, the son of her late brother. The intricacies of the plot converge, bringing the characters full circle in a poignant resolution.

== Cast ==
- Nagarjuna as Prem Krishna / Eeswar Prasad
- Nagma as Priya
- Sarada as Malavika; Ravindra and Kavindra's sister; Eeswar Prasad and Sneha's Aunt
- Baby Shamili as Sneha; Kavindra Prasad and Geeta's daughter; Malavika, Ravindra Prasad and Lalitha's niece; Eeswar's cousin
- Vijayakumar as Bhupathi Raja
- Allu Ramalingaiyah as Priya's grandfather
- Nirmalamma as Priya's grandmother
- Brahmanandam as S. I. Brahmanandam
- Ahuti Prasad as Raja
- Banerjee as Banerjee
- Giri Babu as Malavika's husband
- Narayana Rao as Ravindra Prasad
- Suthi Velu as Nookaraju
- Kadambari Kiran as theatre artist
- Chidatala Appa Rao as theatre artist
- Chitti Babu as theatre artist
- Sreedhar Surapaneni as Bhupati Raja's assistant
- Hussain
- Narsing Yadav as chief security officer
- Annapurna as Mary
- Rama Prabha as Rama Devi
- Tulasi as Nancy
- Jyothi as Lalitha
- Nirmalamma as Priya's grandmother
- Thalapathy Dinesh as Inspector Mohan

== Production ==
Director Fazil originally planned to make the film in Malayalam language with Mohanlal as lead. However, Mohanlal, who was frequently appearing in films catering family audience at that time, declined the dark-themed film. Hence, Fazil decided to do that in Telugu and cast Nagarjuna in the lead role, making necessary changes to the screenplay.

== Soundtrack ==
Killer

Film score by Ilaiyaraaja
- Released: 1992
- Genre: Soundtrack
- Length: 32:05
- Label: LEO Audio

Ilaiyaraaja chronology
Aswamedham (1992)	Killer (1992)	Dharma Kshetram (1992)

The music for the film was composed by Ilaiyaraaja with lyrics by Veturi. It was released by LEO Audio company.

No.	Title	Artist(s)	Length
1.	"Priya Priyathama"	Mano, K.S.Chithra	5:09
2.	"Piliche Kuhu Kuhu"	S. Janaki	4:53
3.	"Sindhura Puvvu (Duet)"	S. P. Balasubrahmanyam, S. Janaki	4:57
4.	"Ukkiri Bikkiri"	S. P. Balasubrahmanyam, K.S.Chithra	5:02
5.	"Oh Rabbi Endabba"	S. P. Balasubrahmanyam, S. Janaki	4:50
6.	"Rambalake Ramju"	S. P. Balasubrahmanyam, K.S.Chithra	5:13
Total length:			32:05

== Release ==
Killer was a commercial success at the box office, which ran for more than 100 days in theatres. The film was dubbed and released in Tamil as Eashwar in October 1992.
