= Aniyathipraavu =

- Movie Poster
- Directed by: Fazil
- Written by: Fazil
- Produced by: Swargachitra Appachan
- Starring: Shalini; Kunchacko Boban; Thilakan; Harisree Asokan; Sudheesh; Srividya; Janardanan
- Cinematography: Anandakuttan
- Edited by: K. R. Gaurishankar; T. R. Shekhar
- Music by: Ouseppachan
- Distributed by: Swargachitra
- Release date: 26 March 1997
- Running time: 158 minutes
- Country: India
- Language: Malayalam

Aniyathipraavu (transl. Younger Sister Dove) is a 1997 Indian Malayalam-language romance film written and directed by Fazil and produced by Swargachitra Appachan. It stars Shalini and Kunchacko Boban in their first lead roles. The music was composed by Ouseppachan with the lyrics by S. Ramesan Nair.

The film was remade in Telugu as Nenu Premisthunnanu (1997), in Tamil as Kadhalukku Mariyadhai (1997) by Fazil with Shalini reprising her role and making her Tamil debut, in Hindi as Doli Saja Ke Rakhna (1998) by Priyadarshan and in Kannada as Preethigagi (2007).

== Plot ==
Sudhish Kumar moves to a new town to pursue his higher studies, in spite of the pressure from his parents to marry and settle down. There, he accidentally meets a beautiful and shy girl, Mini. He instantly falls in love with her, even when her identity remains unknown. When an opportunity presents itself, his friends convince him to talk to her, while she tries to avoid the conversation. This is seen by her brother, who mistakes him as a stalker and so do her two other brothers; who thrash and leave him with a warning. Mini is the apple of the eye of her family. She lives with her mother and three elder brothers (Dr. Kuttappayi, Eeyyo and Varkey). They are overprotective of her and she does not do anything against their wishes. Sudhi's family is not that different, except him being the only son. The thought of Mini now burdens Sudhi's mind and he sets out to find out how she feels about him. He asks her to give him an answer, even if it is a no. Mini on the other hand, is unable to take a decision — further aggravating the situation. When Mini's brother Varkey finds out that Sudhi is still after her, he turns furious and beats him up, warning him to back out. Mini, now realizing that she had always loved him, feels that her timidity worsened the situation. She confesses her feelings to Sudhi and they kindle their relationship. They firmly believe that their families will agree to their relationship, if not immediately. Within days Varkey sees them together, while Sudhi is chasing Mini playfully. He mistakes it to be an attempt to assault her and tries to brutally attack him. Mini with her newfound courage stops Varkey, openly declaring her love for him, shattering Varkey. The news devastates her family as well, leading them to reject her as a part of their family. The grief leads them to take revenge on the one that caused them the pain. They search for Sudhi, forcing the desolate couple to elope. Mini's brothers search for Sudhi in his family home, while verbally abusing his parents, shocking them with the news. Sudhi's parents are convinced that the girl is no good for their son, considering the behavior of her brothers. When the couple arrive at Sudhi's house, they are not welcomed there. With their beliefs broken and without a place to go to, one of the two close friends of Sudhi – Chippayi takes them home to his small fishing village. They are welcomed by his father, Chellappan who is the leader of the village and the villagers. Her brothers trace them to the village that evening and are met with resistance from the villagers. They return and the villagers plan to get the couple legally married the next morning.

Mini and Sudhi, now seeing the situation that they put their families in, and the sorrow that they have brought upon themselves and their families; decide to back out from the relationship and return to their families. They realize that the best thing they can do to prove their love, is to go back to their families. Although initially insulted with their decision to separate, Chellappan appreciates their choice once he understands their reason. Their families, on seeing them return, forgive them right away and accept them back.

Both the families now feel indebted to their children and recognize their pain they try so hard to hide. They search for better matches for them both and Mini's marriage is arranged. Sudhi finds with him a necklace belonging to Mini. His parents decide to go along with him to return the necklace, partially due to Sudhi's mother's wish to meet Mini. Both the families apologize for the happenings earlier and Sudhi apologizes to Mini's mother. The situation being depressing, they decide to leave early, but Sudhi's mother breaks into tears and requests to get Mini married to her son. Everyone, having felt the same way, agree on their marriage and apologize to their children, for the pain that they put them through.

== Cast ==
- Shalini as Mini
- Kunchacko Boban as Sudhish Kumar a.k.a. Sudhi
- Harisree Asokan as Chippayi
- Sudheesh as Radha Madhavan
- Thilakan as Raghupal, Sudhi's father
- Janardanan as Dr. Kuttappayi, Mini's eldest brother
- Cochin Haneefa as Inspector Eeyyo, Mini's second eldest brother
- Shajin as Varkey, Mini's third eldest brother
- Srividya as Nandini Raghupal, Sudhi's mother
- Innocent as Chellappan, Chippayi's father
- K.P.A.C. Lalitha as Mini's mother
- Sankaradi as Ramachandran Nair
- Paravoor Bharathan as Udayavarma Thampuran
- Chandni Shaju as Shyama, Mini's friend
- Kanakalatha as Gracey, Kuttappayi's wife
- Swapna Ravi as Salamma, Eeyyo's wife
- Abi as Santhappan
- Saranya Mohan as Mini's niece
- Vakkachan as Mini's nephew
- Kuriyachan as Mini's nephew
- Mathachan as Mini's nephew
- Seelu as Mini's niece
- Geethu as Mini's niece

== Soundtrack ==
All lyrics are written by S. Ramesan Nair; all music is composed by Ouseppachan.

| No. | Title | Singer(s) | Length |
|---|---|---|---|
| 1. | "Aniyathipraavinu" | K. S. Chithra & Chorus | 5:00 |
| 2. | "Aniyathipraavinu (pathos)" | K. S. Chithra | 2:18 |
| 3. | "Ennum Ninne" | K. J. Yesudas & Sujatha Mohan | 5:00 |
| 4. | "O Priye" | K. J. Yesudas | 5:12 |
| 5. | "O Priye (Duet)" | M. G. Sreekumar, Sujatha Mohan & B. Arundhathi | 5:12 |
| 6. | "Oru Raajamalli" | M. G. Sreekumar | 4:44 |
| 7. | "Vennila Kadappurathu" | C O Anto, K. J. Yesudas, G Venugopal, Sujatha Mohan, M. G. Sreekumar, Kalabhavan Sabu & Chorus | 5:09 |

== Box office ==
The film was a commercial success.

The film completed 125 days run in 11 theatres, 150 days in 7 releasing centres and continuously screened in a single theatre for 300 days.

== Awards ==
Kerala State Film Awards

- Best Dubbing Artist – Sreeja Ravi (dubbed for Shalini)
- Best Dubbing Artist – Krishnachandran (dubbed for Kunchacko Boban)

Screen Videocon Awards South – 1997

- Best Music Director – Ouseppachan

== Legacy ==
The book Love and Love Only that features in the film was fictional, and created by Fazil. It inspired a film of the same name.
