= Dwandha Yudham =

- Directed by: C. V. Hariharan
- Written by: C. V. Hariharan
- Screenplay by: C. V. Hariharan
- Starring: Nagesh; Kuthiravattam Pappu; Sukumari; Jagathy Sreekumar; Bahadoor
- Music by: Jerry Amaldev
- Production company: Suguna Screen
- Distributed by: Suguna Screen
- Release date: 2 October 1981
- Country: India
- Language: Malayalam

Dwandha Yudham is a 1981 Indian Malayalam film, directed by C. V. Hariharan. The film stars Nagesh, Kuthiravattam Pappu, Sukumari and Jagathy Sreekumar in the lead roles. The film has musical score by Jerry Amaldev.

== Plot ==
A rich guy gets two babies, one legitimate and the other illegitimate. The illegitimate kid's uncle switches the babies. The kid at the rich house grows up mentally challenged. The rich father remarries. The stepmom to the rich kid is evil and staying at the house with her brother and two kids. The stepmother, her brother, and kids constantly harass the mentally challenged kid.

The other kid grows into a dashing version of the rich kid married to a woman police officer. He is a womanizer and gets into gambling a lot. Only difference between the two kids is the moustache on the dashing one.

The rich father decides to marry the mentally challenged son so that he can start a family and stay away from the evil stepmother. However, on the day of the marriage, he is kidnapped and locked up.

Meanwhile, the other kid gets caught by the private investigator hired by the rich father to find his only son, as the faces match of both the brothers. He gets to the rich house and teaches the stepmother, her brother and kids a thrashing lesson when they try to get rid of him. The mentally challenged brother sends a pigeon with the message and gets saved by Mala. He ends up freeing himself and finding his way to the woman police officer's house. Although she tries to seduce him, he desires to go home. Next day, he runs home, followed by the distressed wife police officer. He sees his father, who immediately recognizes this is his real son.

After the chaos, the rich father marries off both his sons at one wedding.

== Cast ==
- Kuthiravattam Pappu as Rama chandran/
- Sukumari
- Jagathy Sreekumar as Vinod
- Bahadoor as Paramu
- Jayamalini
- Manavalan Joseph
- Alummoodan
- Jayamalini
- Kunchan as Detective Poker
- Nagesh
- T. R. Omana
- Oduvil Unnikrishnan as Lawyer
- Poojappura Ravi
- Manohar
- Mala Aravindan as S.I. Kuttapu

== Soundtrack ==
The music was composed by Jerry Amaldev and the lyrics were written by P. Bhaskaran.

No.	Song	Singers	Lyrics	Length (m:ss)
1	"Ee Kali Theekkali"	K. J. Yesudas	P. Bhaskaran	
2	"Kadikkaan Pattatha"	K. J. Yesudas, M. G. Radhakrishnan, Junior Mehboob, Omanakkutty	P. Bhaskaran	
3	"Parippuvada Thiruppan"	K. J. Yesudas, P. Jayachandran	P. Bhaskaran	
