= Nadakame Ulakam =

- Film poster
- Directed by: Viji Thampi
- Written by: Sajan Cholayil; Saseendran Vatakara (dialogues)
- Produced by: M. K. Raveendran; M. K. Suresh
- Starring: Mukesh; Vinu Mohan; Sarayu; Saranya Mohan
- Cinematography: Anil Nair
- Edited by: Sangeeth Kollam
- Music by: Songs: Johnson; Background score: Bijibal
- Production company: Sooryakanthi Creations
- Distributed by: Kalpaka Films
- Release date: 25 February 2011
- Country: India
- Language: Malayalam

Nadakame Ulakam is a 2011 Malayalam-language comedy film directed by Viji Thampi and starring Mukesh, Vinu Mohan, Sarayu, and Saranya Mohan in the lead roles. Its songs are composed by veteran music director Johnson with lyrics written by Kaithapram Damodaran Namboothiri. The film was released on 25 February.

== Cast ==
- Mukesh as Omanakuttan
- Vinu Mohan as Murali, Omanakuttan's Brother
- Sarayu as Usha, Omanakuttan's Wife
- Saranya Mohan as Nandana, Murali's Lover
- Jagadish as Pappan, Omanakuttan's Friend
- Siddique as Movie Producer Ram Mohan
- Jagathy Sreekumar as "Labham" Lambodaran Pillai, Omanakuttan's Father-in-Law
- Seema as Herself
- Suraj Venjaramoodu as Pavanan
- Salim Kumar as Vasu, Omanakuttan's Brother-in-Law
- Janardhanan as "Aani" Kurup
- K. P. A. C. Lalitha as Beevathu, Teashop Owner
- Babu Namboothiri as socialist Kumaran, Omanakuttan's Father
- Indrans as Dasan / Dasettan
- Bindu Panicker as "Milma" Girija, Nandana's Mother
- Nandu as Movie Cinematographer
- Shaju Sreedhar as Stephen, Assistant Director
- Sona Nair as Remani, Omanakuttan's Sister
- Dharmajan Bolgatty as Sundaran, Pillai's Helper
- Kulappulli Leela as Seema's Makeup Artist
- Chali Pala
- Jijoy Rajagopal
- Shanavas Shanu as Film Actor

== Soundtrack ==
- "Thevarapoo Malayil (male)" - K. J. Yesudas
- "Vanamaali Ninnodakkuzhalil" - K. S. Chithra, Vijay Yesudas
- "Pookkila Chithary" - M. G. Sreekumar, Chorus
- "Thevarapoo Malayil (female)" - K. S. Chithra
