= Ee Bhoomi Aa Bhanu =

- Directed by: K. C. Venugopal
- Written by: B. H. Mallikarjun
- Produced by: Prabhu M. Hanchinamane
- Starring: Patre Ajith; Saranya Mohan
- Cinematography: P. Rajan
- Edited by: T. Govardhan
- Music by: Prem Kumar S.
- Release date: 11 January 2013
- Country: India
- Language: Kannada

Ee Bhoomi Aa Bhanu is a 2013 Indian Kannada-language drama film directed by K. C. Venugopal and written by B. H. Mallikarjun. The film stars Patre Ajith and Saranya Mohan in the lead roles, with Suresh Heblikar, Sharan, and Mithra in supporting roles. The music was composed by Prem Kumar S., and the cinematography was handled by P. Rajan. Produced by Prabhu M. Hanchinamane, the film was released on 11 January 2013.

== Plot ==
Ee Bhoomi Aa Bhanu revolves around Bhanu (Patre Ajith), a young man with a deep sense of social responsibility, who works at a radio station under the guidance of the station director (Suresh Heblikar). Bhanu falls in love with Bhumi (Saranya Mohan), a kind-hearted girl who shares his values. Their relationship faces challenges due to societal issues, including corruption and social inequality, which Bhanu seeks to address through his work. With the help of his friends, including a comedian (Sharan), Bhanu navigates these obstacles, aiming to bring about change while preserving his bond with Bhumi. The film explores themes of love, duty, and social reform, though critics noted its narrative lacks depth.

== Cast ==
- Patre Ajith as Bhanu
- Saranya Mohan as Bhumi
- Suresh Heblikar as the station director
- Sharan
- Mithra

== Music ==
Ee Bhoomi Aa Bhanu

Soundtrack album by Prem Kumar S.
- Released: 2013
- Recorded: 2013
- Genre: Feature film soundtrack
- Length: 31:44
- Language: Kannada
- Label: T-Series; Lahari Music

Official audio
- Ee Bhoomi Aa Bhanu - Full Album on YouTube

The film's music was composed by Prem Kumar S. The soundtrack album, released in 2013 by T-Series and Lahari Music, consists of seven tracks with a total runtime of 31 minutes and 44 seconds.

Track listing
No.	Title	Singer(s)	Length
1.	"Anudina Neenu"	K. S. Chithra	4:11
2.	"Naadu Nanna Naadu"	Prem Kumar S.	4:49
3.	"Kanase Kanase"	S. P. Balasubrahmanyam	5:04
4.	"Geleya Priyasakha"	Shreya Ghoshal	5:42
5.	"Suli Minche"	Prem Kumar S.	2:07
6.	"Upakarisi Chooru"	Prem Kumar S.	5:16
7.	"Shuru Shuru Sihi"	Prem Kumar S.	5:15
Total length:			31:44

== Reception ==
=== Critical response ===
A critic from The Times of India scored the film at 3 out of 5 stars and wrote, "'Patre' Ajith excels as Bhanu with good dialogue delivery and body language. Sharanya impresses as girl next door. Comedian Sharan's track impresses less. Music by S Premkumar has some catchy tunes, but its overdose tests your patience. Camera by S Premkumar is eye-catching". B. S. Shivani of Deccan Herald wrote, "Ee Bhoomi Aa Bhanu, however, provides a viewer who's sensitive to ills plaguing society, a workable solution. But what about patience". A critic from News18 India wrote, "P. Rajan has done a decent camera work. S. Premkumar's composition of two songs is good. Despite the presence of good artists, 'Ee Bhumi Aa Bhanu' suffers".
