= Sundarakilladi =

- Poster
- Directed by: Murali Krishnan
- Written by: Fazil
- Produced by: Fazil
- Starring: Dileep; Shalini; Nedumudi Venu
- Cinematography: Anandakuttan
- Music by: Ouseppachan
- Production company: Ammu International
- Distributed by: Swargachitra
- Release date: 30 November 1998
- Running time: 150 minutes
- Country: India
- Language: Malayalam

Sundarakilladi is a 1998 Indian Malayalam-language survival drama film directed by Murali Krishnan (in his directorial debut) and written and produced by Fazil. It stars Dileep, Shalini, Nedumudi Venu, Kuthiravattom Pappu, Nandu, Reshmi Boban and Ashokan in the lead roles. The story takes place in Swapnabhoomi, a village suffering from water shortage, Premachandran, the son of a renowned well digger arrives to dig a well on their offer.

== Plot ==
The plot takes place in the fictitious village of Swapnabhoomi, where strange customs and rituals continue to the modern age. Faced with a water shortage, the village-head, sends Bhuvanappan to inform Premachandran of the situation and to commission him to dig a well at Swapnabhoomi. Although Premachandran is the son of a renowned well digger, he is untrained in the profession and makes a living as a stage artist. Thus he's unsure of following his father's footsteps and tries to send away the group form Swapnabhoomi by quoting an outrageous fee for digging the well.

The villagers readily agree to his terms and contracts him to the task by paying his charges upfront. Then he discovers that other workers who had tried to dig a well there died because of earthquake after digging 45 kol (kol is the length in Kerala, 1 kol=72 cm)(33 m). He tries to escape from the people of Swapnabhoomi, but fails and starts the work as a challenge.

Later, he falls in love with the stepdaughter of the physician Devayani, who treats him when he meets with an accident while digging the well. As per the customs of Swapnabhoomi, a girl of the village may only court a man who is from Swapnabhoomi itself. One day a man discovers their love and informs the head of the village. He orders them to stop seeing each other. If Premachandran disobeys, they will kill him and if Devayani disobeys, then they will send her to the mountain where cannibals live.

The head of the village tells Premachandran that, if the well fills with water, then he can marry Devayani. Later, Premachandran learns that on the last day of work, rain should not occur. Because of the fear, the head man orders the destruction of the well, but Premachandran jumps into the well. When Devayani learns about this, she breaks the rule and comes to see him. The people take her to the place where they have to do rituals and send her to the mountains. But water fills the well of Swapnabhoomi. Premachandran informs this to everyone and takes her to his home.

== Cast ==
- Dileep as Premachandra Sundarakilladi aka Preman
- Shalini as Devayani aka Devu
- Nedumudi Venu as Rajamanikkam
- Ashokan as Bhuvanappan
- Babu Namboothiri as Somaji Vaidhyar
- Kuthiravattom Pappu as Vasu
- Nandu as Pradeep
- Remya Salim as Sumangala
- T. P. Madhavan
- Sadiq
- Sankaradi as Malliyannan
- Santo Krishnan

== Music ==
Track	Song	Singers	Length	Lyrics
1	"Manassil Valarnnoru"	Ouseppachan	4:28	Bichu Thirumala
2	"Nadodi Theyyavum"	Sujatha Mohan and K. J. Yesudas	5:17	Bichu Thirumala
3	"Bhoomi Prapenchengale"	K. S. Chithra and Gopi Sunder	4:22	Bichu Thirumala
4	"Koodarakkoottil"	K. J. Yesudas, K. S. Chithra	4:48	Bichu Thirumala
5	"Maadham Pularumbam" - Female	K. S Chithra	3:57	Bichu Thirumala
6	"Maadham Pularumbam" - Duet	K. S. Chithra and Reju Joseph	3:01	Bichu Thirumala
7	"Panchamudipuzha"	M. G. Sreekumar	4:16	Bichu Thirumala

== Reception ==
A critic from The Times of India rated the film two out of five stars and wrote, "A debutant, director Muralikrishnan, proves to be in sync with the latest techniques. His handling of the sequences inside the well is exemplary. The novelty of the topic adds value".
