= En Bommukutty Ammavukku =

- Poster
- Directed by: Fazil
- Written by: Fazil; Gokula Krishnan (dialogues)
- Produced by: R. D. Bhaskar
- Starring: Sathyaraj; Suhasini; Raghuvaran; Rekha; Geetu Mohandas
- Cinematography: Ananda Kuttan
- Edited by: T. R. Shekharr
- Music by: Ilaiyaraaja
- Production company: Pavalar Creations
- Release date: 15 April 1988
- Country: India
- Language: Tamil

En Bommukutty Ammavuku (transl. My doll is for mother) is a 1988 Indian Tamil-language drama film directed by Fazil, starring Sathyaraj, Suhasini, Raghuvaran, Rekha and Geetu Mohandas. It is a remake of Fazil's own Malayalam film Ente Mamattukkuttiyammakku (1983). The film was released on 15 April 1988.

== Plot ==
Lakshmi and Vinod, a couple who lost their daughter in an accident, decide to adopt a girl from the local orphanage. But problems arise when the child's biological parents Mercy and Alex seek to find her.

== Cast ==
- Sathyaraj as Vinod
- Suhasini as Lakshmi
- Raghuvaran as Alex
- Rekha as Mercy
- M. S. Thripunithura as Fr Joseph Epstein
- Janagaraj as Lawyer
- Geetu Mohandas as Tinnu

== Soundtrack ==
The music was composed by Ilaiyaraaja.

Track listing
No.	Title	Lyrics	Singer(s)	Length
1.	"Chitra Chittugal"	Muthulingam	K. S. Chithra	4:32
2.	"Uyire"	Piraisoodan	K. J. Yesudas, K. S. Chithra	4:33
3.	"Kuyile" (duet)	Gangai Amaran	K. J. Yesudas, K. S. Chithra	4:25
4.	"Patharamathu"	Vaali	S. P. Balasubrahmanyam, Malaysia Vasudevan	3:48
5.	"Yaiyaiya Yaiyaiya"		Ilaiyaraaja, K. S. Chithra, Yuvan Shankar Raja	1:50
6.	"Kuyile" (female)	Gangai Amaran	K. S. Chithra, Bhavatharini	4:22
7.	"Bommu Kutti"	Piraisoodan	K. J. Yesudas	4:30
8.	"Nallorgal Unnai"	Gangai Amaran	K. S. Chithra	0:46
9.	"Kuyile" (male)	Gangai Amaran	K. J. Yesudas	4:17
Total length:				33:03

== Reception ==
The Indian Express wrote, "The script moves ever so gracefully plumbing the depths of a bereaved couple's predicament." The reviewer went on to say, "Fazil seems to have given a great deal of thought to every scene. The only drawback of the film ironically contributed by music director Ilayaraja, whose brother Baskar is the film's producer. The one man who is allowed to indulge himself is Ilayaraja (too many songs). After all, it's as good as being his own film".
