= Oru Vilippadakale =

- Directed by: Jeassy
- Written by: Kaloor Dennis
- Screenplay by: Kaloor Dennis
- Produced by: P. M. Shamsudeen
- Starring: Venu Nagavally; M. G. Soman; Sujatha; Sukumari
- Cinematography: Anandakuttan
- Edited by: G. Venkittaraman
- Music by: Jerry Amaldev
- Production company: Saheer Films
- Distributed by: Saheer Films
- Release date: 21 October 1982
- Country: India
- Language: Malayalam

Oru Vilippadakale is a 1982 Indian Malayalam film, directed by Jeassy and produced by P. M. Shamsudeen. The film stars Venu Nagavally, M. G. Soman, Sujatha and Sukumari. The film has musical score by Jerry Amaldev.

== Cast ==
- Venu Nagavally as Vishnu
- M. G. Soman as Unnikrishnan
- Sujatha as Ammu
- Sukumari as Swarnammal
- Jose Prakash
- Sankaradi
- Mala Aravindan
- Kozhikode Narayanan Nair
- Sathyachithra

== Soundtrack ==
The music was composed by Jerry Amaldev with lyrics by P. Bhaskaran.

No.	Song	Singers	Lyrics	Length (m:ss)
1	"Ellaam Ormakal"	S. Janaki, P. Jayachandran	P. Bhaskaran	
2	"Maanathe Nirangal"	S. P. Balasubrahmanyam, Sherin Peters	P. Bhaskaran	
3	"Prakaasha Naalam Chundil Maathram"	S. Janaki	P. Bhaskaran	
