= Chemistry (2009 film) =

- Directed by: Viji Thampi
- Written by: Vinu Kiriyath
- Produced by: Adv. Nagaraj; Vikas Agarwal
- Starring: Saranya Mohan; Mukesh; Shilpa Bala; Vineeth
- Cinematography: Sanjeev Shankar
- Edited by: Raja Mohammad
- Music by: M. Jayachandran
- Release date: 20 November 2009
- Country: India
- Language: Malayalam

Chemistry is a 2009 Indian Malayalam-language horror film directed by Viji Thampi and written by Vinu Kiriyath. The film stars Saranya Mohan, Shilpa Bala, Mukesh and Vineeth, while Manoj K. Jayan, Rajesh Hebbar, Jagathi Sreekumar, and Siddique play supporting roles. The music was composed by M. Jayachandran with cinematography by Sanjeev Shankar and editing by Raja Mohammad. The film released on 20 November 2009. It was dubbed into Tamil as Naan Gowri.

== Plot ==
The story takes place at Mount Academy School, where three girls - Gowri (Shilpa Bala), Kalyani (Drishya) and Alina (Krishna Vijay) - were found dead possibly due to suicide. After some time, all the people in the school return to a normal stage.

Parvathy (Saranya Mohan) joins the school. She is the niece of Sreekanth (Mukesh), the Superintendent of Police, who is probing the death case. Parvathy lives in the same room where Gowri lived. After some days, Gowri's vengeful spirit appears in front of Parvathy, to help her take revenge on the people who killed her. Parvathy becomes friendly to the spirit soon.

Gowri starts telling her story about how she had doting parents, best friends, and a peaceful life. All this was interrupted when Aloshy (Vineeth), the dance teacher of the three dead girls, takes naked pictures of them through hidden cameras. Aloshy at several occasions blackmailed the girls to leak the pictures on the internet. The girls are frightened now as Aloshy always wanted to have sex with them. One fine day, the three girls are about to reveal everything to the teachers, but Aloshy and his lover Jennifer kill the girls. Kalyani and Alina died instantly, but Gowri did not. Aloshy pours more poison in Gowri's mouth and finally kills her.

Meanwhile, Parvathy starts to behave like Gowri, which horrifies everyone. They call an exorcist, who says that Gowri's vengeful spirit has entered Parvathy's body. Gowri is back to kill Aloshy and Jennifer. She succeeds in killing both of them. Gowri puts fire in Jennifer's room and kills her, turning her body beyond recognition, and she pushes off Aloshy from the terrace of his house and kills him. Gowri's spirit now finds peace and bids goodbye to Parvathy, leaving her sad.

== Cast ==
- Saranya Mohan as Parvathy
- Shilpa Bala as Gowri
- Mukesh as SP Sreekanth IPS, Parvathy's Uncle
- Vineeth as Aloshy
- Manoj K. Jayan as Elamadom Bhadran Thirumeni
- Bibin Mangaly as Anandu, Gouri's Lover
- Rajesh Hebbar as Sreeshankar, Parvathy's Father
- Jagathy Sreekumar as Sambashivan
- Siddique as Velayudhan, Gouri's Father
- K.P.A.C. Lalitha as Lakshmikutty Amma, Parvathy's Grandmother
- Suresh Krishna as Father Vattaparambil / Panchara Achan "Sugarcane"
- Vijayakumar as CI Ramdas
- Dinesh Panicker as School Principal
- Harisree Ashokan as Varghese
- Drishya as Kalyani
- Krishna Vijay as Alina
- Lakshmipriya as Jennifer
- Ambika Mohan as Anandu's mother
- Sunitha as Gowri's mother
- Krishna as Dr. Venu
- Akarsh Prakash as Jose
- Rohith as Raheem
- Devaki Rajendran as Juna Mary
- Srividya as Parvathy's mother (photo archive)

== Soundtrack ==
All songs were written by Bichu Thirumala.

- "Muthuchippi Chellakkanne" - M Jayachandran
- "Paattu Paadi" - Jassie Gift, Rimi Tomy
- "Vande Maatharam" - Alex Kayyalaykkal, Chorus, Shweta Mohan, TT Sainoj
- "Muthuchippi Chellakkanne (female)" - Sujatha Mohan
