= Kadhalukku Mariyadhai =

1997 film directed by Fazil

- Poster
- Directed by: Fazil
- Written by: Gokula Krishnan (Dialogue)
- Screenplay by: Fazil
- Story by: Fazil
- Based on: Aniyathipraavu (Malayalam)
- Produced by: Sangili Murugan; V. Ravichandran
- Starring: Vijay; Shalini
- Cinematography: Anandakuttan
- Edited by: K. R. Gowrishankar; T. R. Sekar
- Music by: Ilaiyaraaja
- Production company: Murugan Cine Arts
- Release date: 19 December 1997
- Running time: 165 minutes
- Country: India
- Language: Tamil
- Budget: ₹50 lakh
- Box office: ₹15 crore

Kadhalukku Mariyadhai (transl. Respect for Love) is a 1997 Indian Tamil-language musical romantic drama film directed by Fazil. It is the Tamil remake of Fazil's Malayalam film Aniyathipraavu (1997). The film stars Vijay and Shalini (reprising her role from the original), while Sivakumar, Srividya, K. P. A. C. Lalitha, Manivannan, Dhamu, Charle, Thalaivasal Vijay, and Radha Ravi play supporting roles, of whom Srividya and K.P.A.C. Lalitha reprised their roles from the original film. It tells the story of a couple from differing backgrounds and beliefs and how they unite despite opposition from their families. The music was composed by Ilaiyaraaja with cinematography by Anandakuttan.

Kadhalukku Mariyadhai was released on 19 December 1997 to positive reviews and became a box-office blockbuster. It was also Shalini's first Tamil film as a leading actress, having previously acted as a child artist.

== Plot ==
Jeevanantham "Jeeva" is a rich youth who has just completed his B.Com. Although his parents want him to marry and settle down, Jeeva prefers to pursue an MBA instead and is not interested in marriage. However, his attitude changes when he has a chance encounter at a bookstore with Mini, a Christian girl and a final-year B.Com. student. He instantly falls in love with her, and after a few incidents, succeeds in winning her heart.

However, Mini's three older brothers - a doctor named James, a police officer named Stephen, and a local goon named Thomas - who are all overprotective of her, eventually find out about their sister's relationship with Jeeva and are furious. They thrash Jeeva and his friends Kesavan and Raghavan and warn Jeeva never to come near Mini. Undaunted, Jeeva takes Mini to his house, where his father Rajshekhar also disapproves of their relationship and throws them out.

Kesavan and Raghavan take the couple to their slum near Pondicherry, where Kesavan explains their situation to his father Kalingeyan, a fisherman. Kalingeyan agrees to let the couple stay in his house and also protects them from Mini's brothers when they come to the slum to kill Jeeva. Later, Kalingeyan decides to get Jeeva and Mini married, but by now, Jeeva and Mini have developed second thoughts about their relationship, as their families are against it. They decide to break up and return to their families, which Kesavan, Raghavan, and Kalingeyan accept. Despite breaking up, Jeeva and Mini cannot forget each other.

Meanwhile, Mini's family fixes her marriage with someone else. Jeeva's mother decides to meet Mini before she gets married so that she can get a better wife for Jeeva. Jeeva, his parents, Kesavan, and Raghavan go to Mini's house, where both families apologize to each other for what happened. But when Jeeva and his family are about to leave, Jeeva's mother breaks down and requests that Mini's family marry Mini to Jeeva. Mini's family, including her brothers, agrees to this. Jeeva and Mini are happily reunited.

== Cast ==
- Vijay as Jeevanandham "Jeeva"
- Shalini as Mini
- Srividya as Lakshmi, Jeeva's mother
- Sivakumar as Rajasekhar, Jeeva's father
- Manivannan as Kalingeyan, Kesavan's father
- Charle as Kesavan, Jeeva's friend
- Dhamu as Raghavan, Jeeva's friend
- Radha Ravi as James, a doctor and one of Mini's three brothers
- Thalaivasal Vijay as Stephen, a police officer and another one of Mini's brothers
- Shaji Khan as Thomas, a goon and the youngest of Mini's brothers
- KPAC Lalitha as Mariam Joseph, Mini's mother
- Kaka Radhakrishnan as Major Thangaraj, a retired army officer
- K. R. Vatsala as Anitha, James's wife
- Sasikala Shree as Stella, Stephen's wife
- Poornima as Latha, Mini's friend
- Saranya Mohan as Mini's niece

== Production ==
Kadhalukku Mariyadhai is the Tamil remake of Fazil's Malayalam film Aniyathipraavu. Initially, he was keen on casting a debutant in the lead female role, but Shalini, the lead actress of the original, insisted that she should also star in the remake. Fazil initially approached Abbas for the lead role, but due to mismanagement created by Abbas' manager with call sheets, Vijay was selected instead. Filming began in October 1997, after Vijay completed shooting for his another romantic drama movie Ninaithen Vandhai (1998), and was completed during early December 1997, after which it was set to release on 19 December 1997.

== Soundtrack ==
The soundtrack was composed by Ilaiyaraaja, with lyrics written by Palani Bharathi. Ilayaraja later reused the whole soundtrack for Telugu film Preminchedi Endukamma (1999). The audio rights were acquired by Star Music India, Pyramid Audio Ayngaran and Rajshri Tamil.

Track listing
| No. | Title | Singer(s) | Length |
|---|---|---|---|
| 1. | "Ennai Thalatta Varuvala" | Hariharan, Bhavatharini | 5:05 |
| 2. | "Anantha Kuyilin Pattu" | Malaysia Vasudevan, S. N. Surendar, Arunmozhi, K. S. Chithra, Deepika | 4:58 |
| 3. | "Oru Pattam Poochi" | K. J. Yesudas, Sujatha Mohan | 5:13 |
| 4. | "Idhu Sangeetha Thirunalo" | Bhavatharini | 4:35 |
| 5. | "Anantha Kuyilin Pattu" | K. S. Chithra | 1:53 |
| 6. | "O Baby" | Vijay, Bhavatharini | 4:56 |
| 7. | "Ennai Thalatta Varuvala" | Ilaiyaraaja | 5:05 |
| 8. | "Ayya Veedu Therandhuthan" | Ilaiyaraaja, Arunmozhi | 4:54 |

== Release and reception ==
The film was released on 19 December 1997. A reviewer from The Hindu mentioned that "Vijay brings to surface the soft nature of the love", while adding that the rest of the cast makes "fine contributions", and praising the director's work. K. Vijiyan of New Straits Times wrote "This is a movie for the whole family". Ji of Kalki praised the performances of Vijay, Shalini, Ilaiyaraaja's music and climax but panned the casting choices of Charlie and Dhamu as Vijay's friends. Ananda Vikatan rated the film 50 out of 100. The film saw Vijay win the Tamil Nadu State Film Award for Best Actor alongside Parthiban, while Palani Bharathi won the Tamil Nadu State Film Award for Best Lyricist.

== Legacy ==
Scenes from the film were spoofed in Tamizh Padam (2010). Shiva (Shiva) and a girl take the same book Love and Love Only in a way similar to Vijay and Shalini in Kadhalukku Mariyadhai, but shock awaits as the girl turns out to be married. The song "Ennai Thalatta Varuvala" inspired the title of a 2003 film.

The film's success led the lead pair, Vijay and Shalini, to collaborate again in Kannukkul Nilavu (2000), which was also directed by Fazil and became a success.
