= Poove Poochooda Vaa =

1985 film directed by Fazil

- Poster
- Directed by: Fazil
- Written by: Fazil
- Produced by: Navodaya (a partnership concern)
- Starring: Padmini; S. Ve. Shekher; Nadhiya; Sukumari; Jaishankar
- Cinematography: P. C. Sreeram
- Edited by: T. R. Sekhar
- Music by: Ilaiyaraaja
- Production company: Navodaya (a partnership concern)
- Release date: 19 July 1985
- Country: India
- Language: Tamil

Poove Poochooda Vaa (transl. Come to adorn you with flowers) is a 1985 Indian Tamil-language drama film directed by Fazil and produced by Navodaya (a partnership concern), starring Padmini, S. Ve. Shekher, Nadhiya and Jaishankar. It is a remake of his own Malayalam film Nokkethadhoorathu Kannum Nattu and also marked the Tamil debut of Nadhiya. The film ran for 100 days In many theatres across the state.

== Plot ==
Poongavanathamma is a lonely old woman who lives in a town named Malligaipanthal. She is frequently irritated by the nearby schoolboys ringing her door bell frequently for fun, sneezing while she is going to temple, making a loud noise in the speaker, etc. A girl comes to her home one day and rings the doorbell. Mistaking her for the irritating boys, Poongavanathamma comes to thrash them, but is surprised on seeing a young girl who introduces herself as Sundari, her granddaughter. Poongavanathamma does not invite her inside and tries to shut the door, but Sundari manages to enter the house. Sundari explains how she knows about her grandmother and how she arrived at her doorstep but Poongavanathamma does not respond to anything.

Sundari, being a mischievous girl, pranks her neighbour David, a young man, by scaring him with the demon's mask while he is working out on his terrace. She befriends the boys who irritate her grandmother and play all sorts of pranks and becomes the loving girl in her area. Sundari finds that her grandma likes yellow colour very much and tries to impress her with that. But Poongavanthamma gets angry and throws her out of her home at night. But she again takes her back and explains why she has behaved like that.

Poongavanthamma, being a single mother was very close to her daughter. She permitted her daughter to marry the man of her choice on the condition that the groom must live with them forever. But the groom did not keep the promise and he took her daughter away. After the death of her daughter, she pleaded to get back the child from her son-in-law, to which he refused. She also had an unsuccessful legal attempt to get the custody of her granddaughter as she is too old to take care of a child. Since 17 years, neither Sundari nor her father visited her home. This made her frustrated and angry as her waiting for 17 years to hear the door bell rung by her granddaughter did not happen. Sundari promises her grandmother that she will never leave her alone no matter who calls her. From then on, Poongavanthamma and Sundari bond with each other. Sundari also realises how affectionate her grandmother is towards her at many points. Poongavanthamma removes the much troubling doorbell as her desire got fulfilled by Sundari's arrival.

Sundari wanted a yellow rose plant for her garden and finds out that David has one. She visits his house to request him and pranks him that the sunglasses which she wears make the wearing person to see only the body of the person and not their clothes. David is shocked by that and runs away from her view. David wants to get revenge on her by stealing the glasses and look at her without her clothes as she did to him. He manages to steal the sunglasses, but finds that Sundari played a prank on him. This further angers him and waits for a time for him to come. Sundari invites David for the Deepavali festival combined with her birthday party. David presents her a set of crackers which delights her. But Sundari gets injured when bursting crackers and David gets satisfied that his plan worked. Sundari understands about David and tells him that all her pranks were only meant to make people happy, not to hurt them and apologises to him if she had hurt him in any way and treats her injury as her birthday gift by David.

David's friend Alex visits his home and recognises Sundari who is the friend of his sister. He immediately rushes to inform her father about her whereabouts. When David asks for the reason, he informs him that Sundari is counting her last days. Sundari met with an accident a few days ago. She was treated and discharged from the hospital; however, she was diagnosed with brain disorder which requires a major operation for survival, which does not guarantee to save her life. Sundari does not want to lose her life without enjoying it and she cannot tolerate the pain of her family and hence she came away uninformed. David feels very bad for behaving rudely with Sundari and he apologises to her for his acts.

Sundari's father Sundaram visits Poongavanthamma's house to pick up his daughter, but Poongavanthamma neither allows him to come inside nor to explain why he had come. Sundaram seeks the help of the town's Church priest and headmaster of the town's school to allow him to take his daughter with him. Sundari gets promises from everyone including her father that her grandmother should not know about her condition. Poongavanthamma and Sundari get into a quarrel one night and Sundari is compelled to tell the truth about her health. Poongavanthamma visits the church that night and expresses that she has no objection to take Sundari for operation and she would make her sleep as Sundari would not go with them while she is awake. Sundari is transported in an ambulance for the operation. All others except David leave the place and David sees Poongavanthamma fixing the doorbell again, hoping that it would again be rung by her granddaughter Sundari.

== Cast ==
- Padmini as Poongavanathamma
- Nadhiya as Sundari (Voice dubbed by Durga)
- S. Ve. Shekher as David
- Sukumari as David's mother
- V. K. Ramasamy
- Jaishankar as Sundaram
- Ragini (photo) as Sundari's mother
- Raveendran (Guest)
- Charle

== Production ==
Poove Poochooda Vaa is a remake of the Malayalam film Nokkethadhoorathu Kannum Nattu. That film's director Fazil and lead actresses Padmini and Nadhiya reprised their roles from the Malayalam version, with Nadhiya making her Tamil debut.

== Soundtrack ==
The soundtrack was composed by Ilaiyaraaja, with lyrics by Vairamuthu.

Track	Singer	Duration
"Chinna Kuyil Paadum Pattu"	K. S. Chithra	4:20
"Pattasu Chuttu"	K. S. Chithra	4:51
"Poovae Poochudava" – (Female)	K. S. Chithra	4:31
"Poovae Poochudava" – (Male)	K. J. Yesudas	4:32

== Critical reception ==
On 6 October 1985, the review board of Ananda Vikatan rated the film 55 out of 100. Jayamanmadhan of Kalki praised the performances of Nadhiya, Padmini, the cinematography and music. Balumani of Anna praised acting, music and direction.
