= Nokkethadhoorathu Kannum Nattu =

1984 film directed by Fazil

- Poster
- Directed by: Fazil
- Written by: Fazil
- Produced by: Ousepachan Valakuzhy
- Starring: Padmini; Nadhiya Moidu; Mohanlal
- Cinematography: Ashok Kumar
- Edited by: T. R. Sekhar
- Music by: Jerry Amaldev; Johnson (Score)
- Production company: Bodhichitra Films
- Distributed by: Dinny Films
- Release date: 1 February 1984
- Country: India
- Language: Malayalam

Nokkethadhoorathu Kannum Nattu (transl. Gazing as far as the eye can see) is a 1984 Indian Malayalam-language drama film written and directed by Fazil, and starring Padmini, Nadhiya Moidu and Mohanlal. The film features original songs composed by Jerry Amaldev and background score by Johnson. Nadhiya made her Malayalam and acting debut through this film. The film also marked the comeback of Padmini after a hiatus. Nokkethadhoorathu Kannum Nattu was the highest-grossing Malayalam film of the year at the box office and ran for more than 200 days in theatres. It won the Kerala State Film Award for Best Film with Popular Appeal and Aesthetic Value. Nadhiya won the Filmfare Award for Best Actress – Malayalam. The film was remade in Tamil titled Poove Poochooda Vaa (1985) by Fazil himself, in Telugu as Muddula Manavaraalu (1986) by Jandhyala and in Hindi as Paayal (1992) by Mahendra Shah.

== Plot ==
Kunjoonjamma Thomas is a widow living alone in the village. People always make fun of her because she is grumpy and depressed due to the deaths of her husband and her only child. Children irritate her by ringing her doorbell and running away. One day, her granddaughter Girly, whom she had never met, visits her. Initially, Kunjoonjamma does not like Girly, but they soon become close. Kunjoonjamma takes down the doorbell, saying to Girly that its only purpose was for Girly's return. Now that Girly is with her, she doesn't need it. Kunjoonjamma's neighbor, Sreekumar, falls in love with Girly. One day, Sreekumar's friend, Alexi, comes to his house and sees Girly. He identifies her as a girl missing from Delhi and immediately informs her father about her whereabouts.

Girly had run away from Delhi because she had brain tumor and did not have much time to live. She wanted to enjoy the rest of her life. When her father comes to take her back to Delhi for an urgent operation, she refuses to go, claiming that even the doctors are not sure whether the operation will be successful. initially, the reason Girly had been separated from her grandmother aligned with her mother wanting to distance herself from her grandmother, following her mother's death after the pair left for abroad, Girly's grandmother blames her father, thinking he is the cause of her daughter's death, they end up rekindling due to Girly, and finally towards the climax, Her grandmother mixes sleeping pills in soup and gives it to Girly, and her father takes her to Delhi while she is unconscious. With Sreekumar finding a picture of himself in Girly's room while packing her things for Delhi, he realizes she must have reciprocated his feelings for her. The movie ends with an ending open to interpretation, the ambulance slowly fading away into the darkness. Sreekumar watches it leave, with sadness and hope, and when he turns away, he sees Kunjoonjamma refixing the doorbell, hoping Girly will return one day.

== Cast ==
- Mohanlal as Sreekumar
- Padmini as Kunjoonjamma Thomas, Girly's grandmother
- Nadhiya Moidu as Girly Mathews
- K. P. Ummer as Mathews, Girly's father
- Nedumudi Venu as the priest
- Thilakan as Alexander, a school headmaster staying in the neighborhood
- Maniyanpilla Raju as Abdu, Sreekumar's friend
- Sukumari as Sreekumar's mother
- Usha as Child Artist, In Song Lathiri Poothiri Punchiri
- Master Sam as Jacob Alexander
- Master Asif as Unni Alexander
- Master Cherian as Jo Alexander
- Fazil as Alexi (Cameo appearance)
- Ragini as Manikutty (Girly's mother) (photo)

== Production ==
Some portions of the film was shot at the Udaya Studios in Alappuzha, such as the dance sequences of the song "Lathiri Poothiri Punthiri Cheppo" and a Christmas scene. During that scene, Nadhiya Moidu's hand was burnt with a sparkler from a fellow dancer, which left a scar on her hand since then. Nokkethadhoorathu Kannum Nattu was the debut film of Nadhiya Moidu and the comeback film of Padmini onscreen. It is also the acting debut and the only film appearance of Fazil as of 2017, who did a minor role until 2019 film Lucifer. Nadhiya Moidu's voice was dubbed by Bhagyalakshmi in the film. This film marked the film debut of director duo Siddique-Lal, who worked as assistant directors to Fazil.

== Soundtrack ==
The music was composed by Jerry Amaldev and lyrics was written by Bichu Thirumala. The songs sung by K. S. Chithra in the film gave her first break in her career.

No.	Song	Singers	Lyrics	Length
1	"Aaraadhana Nisha Sangeethamela"	K. J. Yesudas, K. S. Chithra, Chorus	Bichu Thirumala	
2	"Aayiram Kannumaay"	K. S. Chithra, Chorus	Bichu Thirumala	
3	"Aayiram Kannumaay"	K. J. Yesudas, Chorus	Bichu Thirumala	
4	"Aayiram Kannumaay [Pathos]"	K. J. Yesudas	Bichu Thirumala	
5	"Kiliye Kiliye"	K. S. Chithra, Chorus	Bichu Thirumala	

== Reception ==
The film was the second highest grossing Malayalam film of the year and was the longest running Malayalam film of the year, running for 175 days in theatres. The performances of Mohanlal, Nadhiya, and Padmini were critically acclaimed.

== Awards ==
Kerala State Film Awards

- Best Film with Popular Appeal and Aesthetic Value - Bodhichitra (Ouseppachan, Khayas, Kurian) and Fazil
- Best Female Singer - K. S Chithra

Filmfare Awards South

- Filmfare Award for Best Actress - Malayalam - Nadhiya Moidu

== Remakes ==
A Tamil remake was made by Fazil himself as Poove Poochooda Vaa, in which Nadhiya Moidu and Padmini reprise their roles. Mohanlal's role was done by S. V. Shekhar. The film was a commercial success. It was also remade in Telugu as Muddula Manavaraalu (1986), directed by Jandhyala and in Hindi as Paayal (1992).

== Sequel ==
Fazil once planned to make a sequel for the film, which did not materialise. He had a plot of Girly after the operation and Sreekumar searching for her. He said in an interview with Vanitha.
