= Ente Mamattukkuttiyammakku =

- Promotional poster
- Directed by: Fazil
- Written by: Fazil
- Produced by: Navodaya (a partnership concern)
- Starring: Bharat Gopy; Mohanlal; Shalini; Sangeeta Naik; Poornima Jayaram
- Cinematography: Ashok Kumar
- Edited by: T. R. Shekhar
- Music by: Jerry Amaldev
- Production company: Navodaya (a partnership concern)
- Release date: 7 October 1983
- Country: India
- Language: Malayalam

Ente Mamattukkuttiyammakku (transl. For my Mamattukuttiyamma; also known as Ente Mamattikkuttiyammakku) is a 1983 Indian Malayalam-language family drama film produced by Navodaya (a partnership concern). It was written and directed by Fazil and stars Bharat Gopy, Mohanlal, Shalini, Poornima Jayaram, and Sangeeta Naik. The film was reported to be heavily inspired by the 1982 film Annie.

In the film, Vinod and Sethu lose their only child in an accident. Years pass and Sethu is still grieving. To comfort her, Vinod adopts a child, Tintumol (Mamattukuttiyamma), from an orphanage. Sethu, initially reluctant to love her, gradually develops an affection for her. But just when things are getting back to normal, Tintumol's biological father, Alex, starts trailing Vinod, constantly requesting to return his daughter. Now, Sethu and Vinod are dragged into a situation where they might lose their second child as well.

Ente Mamattukkuttiyammakku was an Industry Hit and critical success and became the highest-grossing Malayalam film of the year. The film won four Kerala State Film Awards—Best Film, Best Director, Best Actor (Gopy), and Best Child Artist (Shalini). It was remade in Tamil as En Bommukutty Ammavukku (1988) by Fazil himself and in Telugu as Paape Maa Praanam (1989).

== Plot ==
A couple, Sethulakshmi and Vinod, lose their daughter (Divya Unni) in an accident. The family was traveling in a boat, and the couple's daughter goes to the top of the boat to play with her doll. The other children throw her doll into the water, making her jump into the water. The couple search for the girl but in vain. They find her floating in the water, which comes as a big shock to Sethu.

Years later, Vinod decides to adopt a girl named Tintu. Sethu didn't want to adopt a child. Still, Vinod forces Sethu to see Tintu in the orphanage. Sethu refuses, as she lost her child and doesn't want any more. Vinod makes her understand, and Sethu agrees. They adopt Tintu.

After Tintu is brought into the home, the couple becomes as happy as earlier. But problems arise when Alex asks for the child, claiming it to be his wife's child as a result of an affair before their marriage. Initially, Sethu refuses but later gives the child to her real mother.

== Cast ==
- Bharath Gopi as Vinod
- Mohanlal as Alex, Tintu's father
- Baby Shalini as Mamattikuttiyama / Tintumol
- Sangeeta Naik as Sethulakshmi / Sethu
- Poornima Jayaram as Mercy, Tintu's mother
- Thilakan as Fr. Joseph Sebastian
- Rajan P. Dev as Adv. Thomas George

== Production ==
=== Title ===
The film's original title was Ente Mamattukkuttiyammakku, but due to a printing mistake, it came out as Ente Mamattikkuttiyammakku in posters and publicity materials. Fazil heard the name Mamoottamma from a household in Northern Kerala. He modified that name to create the character Mamattukkuttiyamma.

=== Casting ===
Fazil selected Shalini for the title role immediately after he saw her photograph shown by someone in the production crew. She was three years old when she acted in the film. Although Shalini had already made her debut in Aadyathe Anuraagam, it was Ente Mamattukkuttiyammakku that gave her recognition. "Baby Shalini" became a successful child artist and appeared in similar roles in her subsequent films.

=== Filming ===
The film was shot in Kochi and Alappuzha. The outdoor scenes showing Bharat Gopi's office and work site were shot in Hotel Vivanta near the Menaka bus stop. The building was under construction then. The scenes showing Gopi's home were shot in Alappuzha's west side near the beach. Some of the scenes were taken in Kakkanad, including Kusumagiri Mental Hospital. The film was made in just 30 days.

== Soundtrack ==
The music was composed by Jerry Amaldev and the lyrics were written by Bichu Thirumala.

No.	Song	Singers	Lyrics	Length
1	"Aalorungi Arangorungi"	K. S. Chithra	Bichu Thirumala	
2	"Kannodu Kannoram"	K. J. Yesudas	Bichu Thirumala	
3	"Mounangale Chaanchaduvan"	K. J. Yesudas	Bichu Thirumala	
4	"Thaimanikkunju Thennal"	K. S. Chithra, Chorus	Bichu Thirumala	

== Awards ==
Kerala State Film Awards

- Best Film
- Best Director - Fazil
- Best Actor – Bharath Gopi
- Best Child Artist – Baby Shalini
