= Fazil (director) =

Indian film director, film producer, screenwriter and actor

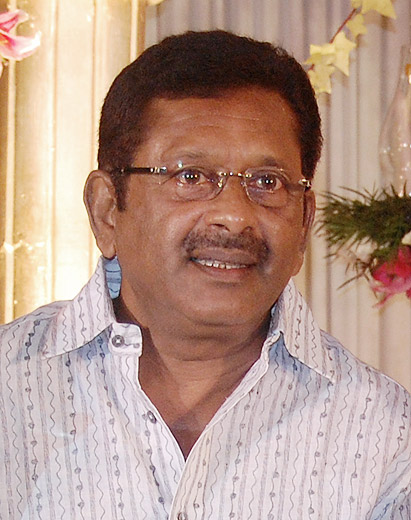
- Born: Abdul Hameed Muhammed Fazil; 4 February 1949 (age 77); Alappuzha, Kingdom of Travancore (present-day Kerala), India
- Occupations: Film director; Film producer; Screenwriter; Actor
- Years active: 1980–present
- Children: Fahadh Fazil, Farhaan Fazil, Fatima Fazil, Ahmeda Fazil
- Relatives: Nazriya Nazim (daughter-in-law)

Abdul Hameed Muhammed Fazil (born 4 February 1949) is an Indian film director, film producer, screenwriter and actor who works in Malayalam cinema, in addition to directing a handful of Tamil films, few of which are remake of his own directional Malayalam films. He made his directorial debut with the 1980 film Manjil Virinja Pookkal.

His popular films include Ente Mamattikkuttiyammakku (1983), Nokkethadhoorathu Kannum Nattu (1984), Poovinu Puthiya Poonthennal (1986), Manivathoorile Aayiram Sivarathrikal (1987), Ente Sooryaputhrikku (1991), Pappayude Swantham Appoos (1992), Manichitrathazhu (1993), Harikrishnans (1998). His 1993 film Manichitrathazhu won the National Film Award for Best Popular Film Providing Wholesome Entertainment. He won the Best Director award at the 13th Kerala State Film Awards for his 1984 film Ente Mamattukkuttiyammakku.

== Early life ==
His father wanted him to be a doctor, but in school and college, extracurricular activities dominated his time. He wrote plays and staged them with his friends; Nedumudi Venu was his college mate while he was in S.D. College, Alappuzha, and this group was perhaps the first mimicry team that entertained crowds. "I used to mimic stars like Sathyan, Prem Nazir, Sivaji Ganesan and Govindankutty." He completed his graduate and post-graduate degrees in economics from the department of economics at S.D. College in Alappuzha.

== Film career ==
Since the early 1980s, Fazil has directed 31 movies. His debut was with the Malayalam film Manjil Virinja Pookkal, produced by Navodaya Appachan, which was also Mohanlal's first theatrical movie. Fazil has a knack for spotting talent. He introduced some of the biggest names in films in South India:

- Mohanlal in Manjil Virinja Pookkal
- Nadia Moidu in Nokkethadhoorathu Kannum Nattu
- Baby Shalini in Ente Mamattikkuttiyammakku
- Kunchacko Boban in Aniyathipravu
- Nagma was introduced in south Indian film with Fazil's Killer (Telugu)
- Khushbu started her south journey with his Varusham Padhinaaru
- Fahadh Faasil in Kaiyethum Doorath

With numerous Malayalam films, as well as several Tamil films and one Telugu film, Fazil has won the most number of State awards for the best film with popular appeal and aesthetic value.

== Personal life ==
Fazil has two sons, Fahadh Faasil and Farhaan Faasil, and two daughters, Fatima Faasil and Ahmeda Faasil. Fahadh and Farhaan are both actors working primarily in the Malayalam film industry. Fahadh is married to actress Nazriya Nazim.

== Filmography ==
=== Directed films ===
| Year | Film | Language | Notes |
|---|---|---|---|
| 1980 | Manjil Virinja Pookkal | Malayalam | |
| 1981 | Dhanya | Malayalam | |
| 1983 | Eettillam | Malayalam | |
| 1983 | Ente Mamattikkuttiyammakku | Malayalam | |
| 1983 | Marakkillorikkalum | Malayalam | |
| 1985 | Nokketha Dhoorathu Kannum Nattu | Malayalam | |
| 1985 | Poove Poochooda Vaa | Tamil | Remake of Nokketha Dhoorathu Kannum Nattu |
| 1986 | Ennennum Kannettante | Malayalam | |
| 1986 | Poovinu Puthiya Poonthennal | Malayalam | |
| 1987 | Manivathoorile Aayiram Sivarathrikal | Malayalam | |
| 1987 | Poovizhi Vasalile | Tamil | Remake of Poovinu Puthiya Poonthennal |
| 1988 | En Bommukutty Ammavukku | Tamil | Remake of Ente Mamattikkuttiyammakku |
| 1989 | Varusham Padhinaaru | Tamil | Remake of Ennennum Kannettante |
| 1990 | Arangetra Velai | Tamil | Remake of Ramji Rao Speaking |
| 1991 | Ente Sooryaputhrikku | Malayalam | |
| 1991 | Karpoora Mullai | Tamil | Simultaneously shot with Ente Sooryaputhrikku |
| 1992 | Killer | Telugu | |
| 1992 | Pappayude Swantham Appoos | Malayalam | |
| 1993 | Kilipetchu Ketkava | Tamil | |
| 1993 | Manichitrathazhu | Malayalam | |
| 1994 | Manathe Vellitheru | Malayalam | |
| 1997 | Aniyathipravu | Malayalam | |
| 1997 | Kadhalukku Mariyadhai | Tamil | Remake of Aniyathipravu |
| 1998 | Harikrishnans | Malayalam | |
| 2000 | Kannukkul Nilavu | Tamil | |
| 2000 | Life Is Beautiful | Malayalam | |
| 2002 | Kaiyethum Doorath | Malayalam | |
| 2004 | Vismayathumbathu | Malayalam | |
| 2005 | Oru Naal Oru Kanavu | Tamil | |
| 2009 | Moz & Cat | Malayalam | |
| 2011 | Living Together | Malayalam | |

=== Produced films ===
- All films are in Malayalam, unless otherwise noted.

| Year | Film | Notes |
|---|---|---|
| 1988 | Kakkothikkavile Appooppan Thaadikal | |
| 1989 | Ramji Rao Speaking | |
| 1997 | Chandralekha | |
| 1998 | Sundarakilladi | |
| 2000 | Life Is Beautiful | |
| 2002 | Kaiyethum Doorath | |
| 2003 | Chronic Bachelor | |
| 2004 | Vismayathumbathu | |
| 2022 | Malayankunju | |

=== As writer ===
| Year | Film | Language | Director |
|---|---|---|---|
| 1988 | Kakkothikkavile Appooppan Thaadikal | Malayalam | Kamal |
| 1992 | Killer | Telugu | Himself |
| 1995 | No. 1 Snehatheeram Bangalore North | Malayalam | Sathyan Anthikad |
| 1998 | Sundarakilladi | Malayalam | Murali Krishnan |

=== As actor ===
| Year | Film | Language | role |
|---|---|---|---|
| 1984 | Nokkethadhoorathu Kannum Nattu | Malayalam | Alexi (Cameo appearance) |
| 1988 | Isabella | Malayalam | Cameo appearance |
| 1993 | Vatsalyam | Malayalam | Uncredited role |
| 2019 | Lucifer | Malayalam | Father Nedumbally |
| 2021 | Marakkar: Arabikadalinte Simham | Malayalam | Kutti Ali Marakkar |
| 2025 | L2: Empuraan | Malayalam | Father Nedumpally |

== Awards ==
=== National Film Awards ===
- 1993 – National Film Award for Best Popular Film Providing Wholesome Entertainment for Manichitrathazhu

=== Kerala State Film Awards ===
- 1993: Best Film with Popular Appeal and Aesthetic Value – Manichithrathazhu
- 1986: Best Film with Popular Appeal and Aesthetic Value – Ennennum Kannettante
- 1984: Best Film with Popular Appeal and Aesthetic Value – Nokketha Dhoorathu Kannum Nattu
- 1983: Best Film – Ente Mamattikkuttiyammakku
- 1983: Best Director – Ente Mamattikkuttiyammakku
- 1980: Best Film with Popular Appeal and Aesthetic Value – Manjil Virinja Pookkal

=== Filmfare Awards South ===
- 1985: Best Director in Tamil for Poove Poochooda Vaa

== See also ==
- List of Malayalam films from 1976 to 1980
- List of Malayalam films from 1981 to 1985
- List of Malayalam films from 1986 to 1990
- List of Malayalam films from 1991 to 1995
- List of Malayalam films from 1996 to 2000
